= Missing white woman syndrome =

Term for disproportionate media attention

Missing white woman syndrome is a term used by some social scientists, as well as media commentators, to denote disproportionate media coverage, especially on television, of missing-person cases toward white women and girls as compared to cases involving male subjects or women of color. Proponents of this notion posit that it encompasses supposed disproportionate media attention to female subjects who are young, attractive, white, and upper middle class.

Although the term was coined in the context of missing-person cases, it is sometimes used of coverage of other violent crimes. The phenomenon has been highlighted in the United States, Canada, the United Kingdom, Australia, New Zealand, and other predominantly white countries, as well as South Africa.

Despite the popularity of the term "missing white woman syndrome", there have been few empirical studies examining the subject. A 2016 study found that black missing persons received a disproportionately low share of news coverage when compared to their rate of missingness. This study also found that once a missing persons case appeared in the news, white girls' and women's cases received more intense coverage than cases involving missing persons of other demographics.

In addition, in a later 2019 study, gender was a significant factor in media coverage of missing person cases. This study found that female victims receive more coverage overall, and national and out-of-state attention is even more skewed towards representing women. The 2019 study also found missing person cases involving White people received more media attention than those involving Black people; however, the authors also reported that non-black women of color (such as Asian and Latina women) are just as over-represented as white women in news coverage, suggesting that the misnomer of "missing white woman syndrome" is rather a function of the under-representation of black women in media cases. Analysis has also found that missing women are twelve times more likely than missing men to receive attention in Louisiana, despite men and women going missing at similar rates nationally.

The phenomenon has led to a number of tough-on-crime measures, mainly on the political right, that were named for white women who disappeared and were subsequently found harmed. In addition to race and class, factors such as supposed attractiveness, body size, and youthfulness have been identified as unfair criteria in the determination of newsworthiness in coverage of missing women. News coverage of missing black women was more likely to focus on the victim's problems, such as abusive boyfriends, criminal history, or drug addiction, while coverage of white women often tended to focus on their roles as mothers, daughters, students, and contributors to their communities.

== Origins and criticism ==
American news anchor Gwen Ifill is credited with originating the phrase at the UNITY: Journalists of Color journalism conference in 2004. At the conference, she said: "I call it the missing white woman search syndrome. If there is a missing white woman we're going to cover that every day." Charlton McIlwain defined the syndrome as "white women occupying a privileged role as violent crime victims in news media reporting", and posited that missing white woman syndrome functions as a type of racial hierarchy in the cultural imagery of the U.S. Eduardo Bonilla-Silva categorized the racial component of missing white woman syndrome as a "form of racial grammar, through which white supremacy is normalized by implicit, or even invisible standards".

== Studies, reports and analyses ==
=== United States ===
In 2003, the San Francisco Chronicle published an article detailing the disparity between the coverage of the Laci Peterson case, and that of Evelyn Hernandez, a Hispanic woman – both of whom disappeared in 2002. A report that aired on CNN in 2006 noted the differences in the level of media coverage given to missing white women (such as Laci Peterson and Natalee Holloway), when compared to the level of coverage given to LaToyia Figueroa, a pregnant black Hispanic woman. Figueroa disappeared in Philadelphia in 2005, the same year Holloway disappeared.

A 2010 study of news coverage of missing children found that black missing children cases were significantly underrepresented, when compared to national statistics. Missing black girls were significantly underrepresented in national news reporting. The coverage of death cases for black boys was significantly greater than expected. Coverage of non-black female kidnapping cases was greater than expected. A subsequent study found that children from minority groups, especially black children, were more likely to remain missing for longer periods of time.

A 2013 study that addressed media coverage of missing children, focusing on sex, but not race, found that "the results revealed that gender and age play only a minor role in deciding which abduction incidents are covered by newspapers, as well as the extent to which they are reported on. Specifically, newspapers dedicated more words to female victims than male victims, and reported more on younger children (aged 11 and under) than older children (aged 12 and over) when they were the victim of a nonfamily abduction." In 2015, a report was published that re-examined the results from Min and Feaster's 2010 study about media coverage of missing children and confirmed that the media coverage of white missing persons was disproportionate compared to non-white people, but found that the coverage of women was not as biased as the 2010 study concluded.

In 2016, Zach Sommers, a sociologist at Northwestern University, published a study explaining that while there is a sizable body of research that shows that white people are more likely than people of color to appear in news coverage as victims of violent crime, there is relatively little when it comes to missing persons cases. Sommers cross-referenced the missing persons coverage of four national and regional media outlets against the FBI's missing persons database and found that black people were disproportionately less likely to appear in the news when compared to their rates of missingness; he also found that among those missing persons who appeared in the news, the coverage was much more intense (i.e., more articles were written) for white women and girls than other demographic groups.

Professor Eduardo Bonilla-Silva theorised that the subtle standard of placing a premium on white lives in the news helps to maintain and reinforce a racial hierarchy with white people at the top. For example, black women are perceived as members of both a marginalized racial group and a marginalized sex group. Crucially, though, black women have an "intersectional experience [that] is greater than the sum of racism and sexism". In other words, like white women, black women are subject to sexism, but the form of that sexism differs for black women because of the compounding effects of racial discrimination, with missing white woman syndrome argued to be a pertinent manifestation of this social phenomenon.

Some sociologists have argued that the tone of media coverage for black female victims differs markedly from coverage of white female victims in that the former are more likely to be blamed for purportedly putting themselves in harm's way, either knowingly or unknowingly. Victim blaming in this context reinforces the notion that black female victims are not only less innocent, but also less worthy of rescue relative to white women. Other observers note the lack of publicity given to black female victims of police brutality in news coverage, attributing the silence to a tradition of "sexism and patriarchy" in American society.

Kym Pasqualini, president of the National Center for Missing Adults, observed that media outlets tend to focus on "damsels in distress"—typically, affluent young white women and teenagers. In a 2016 Esquire article about the disappearance of Tiffany Whitton, journalist Tom Junod observed that white women of lower social status, such as Whitton, a 26-year-old unemployed drug addict who was on parole, do not get much media attention, as "media outlets are ruthlessly selective, and they tend to prefer women who are white, pretty, and, above all, innocent". Her mother stated that producers of shows like Nancy Grace told her they weren't interested in her daughter's case. Dr. Cory L. Armstrong wrote in The Washington Post: "The pattern of choosing only young, white, middle-class women for the full damsel treatment says a lot about a nation that likes to believe it has consigned race and class to irrelevance."

In 2017, a research paper from the University of South Florida studied media coverage and found "disparities in coverage were seen based on race and age. In addition, the narratives of the reports were framed as cautionary tales, and victims were seen as active participants in their disappearance." According to a 2019 study, missing person cases involving both white women and white men received more media attention than those involving black women and men. The authors reported that non-black women of color (such as Asian and Latina women) were just as over-represented as white women in news coverage of missing persons, suggesting that "missing white woman syndrome" is mainly a function of the under-representation of black women in media cases.

Between 2007 and 2020, the National Crime Information Center (NCIC) database maintained by the Criminal Justice Information Services Division of the Federal Bureau of Investigation (FBI) saw an annual average of 664,776 missing person files entered into its database. In its 2020 compilation of NCIC missing and unidentified person files (which included 543,018 and 8,284 files respectively for the year), the FBI found that of the missing person files for whom the person's race and sex were known, 321,830 (or approximately 61.3%) were White or Hispanic, (Note: Note: White and Hispanic missing person files are combined in the compilation.) 182,529 (or approximately 34.8%) were black, 10,776 (or approximately 2.1%) were Asian, and 9,571 (or approximately 1.8%) were Native American, while 264,760 (or approximately 50.5%) were male, 159,029 (or approximately 30.3%) were white or Hispanic women, and the only racial category with more female files than male was Native Americans. For the 80,442 active missing person files at end-of-year, 48,710 (or approximately 60.6%) were white or Hispanic, 28,201 (or approximately 35.1%) were black, 2,035 (or approximately 2.5%) were Asian, and 1,496 (or approximately 1.9%) were Native American, while 44,048 (or approximately 54.8%) were male and 20,990 (or approximately 26.1%) were white or Hispanic women.

In comparison, white and Hispanic people accounted for 61.6% and 18.7% respectively of the U.S. population in the 2020 United States census (or 80.3% combined), while black people accounted for 12.4%, Asian people accounted for 6%, and Native Americans accounted for 1.1%. In its 2020 Demographic Analysis, the United States Census Bureau estimated that the male-to-female sex ratio in the United States ranged from 98.1:100 to 98.2:100. Only 13 states require that local police departments enter missing or unidentified person files into the National Missing and Unidentified Persons System. Additionally, in its 2019 Uniform Crime Report, the FBI found that 54.7% of murder victims in the United States for whom their race was known were black and that 78.3% for whom their sex was known were male, while approximately 14% of the U.S. population as a whole was black in the Census Bureau's 2019 American Community Survey and the Census Bureau estimated that the U.S. population retained the female majority in its sex ratio. (Note: Note: The United States Census Bureau has estimated that the U.S. population has been majority female since 1946.)

The Wyoming Urban Indian Health Institute published a study in 2020, led by professor Emily A. Grant, which found marked differences in news coverage of missing and murdered Native Americans compared to coverage of white people who were murdered or missing. Missing Native Americans in Wyoming were less likely to be profiled in media unless they were found dead compared to being profiled while still missing; news stories tended to feature more negative information about the lives of Native Americans; and such articles were less likely to feature a photo of the missing person if they were Indigenous.

=== Canada ===
According to a 2008 study published in The Law and Society Association, Indigenous women who go missing in Canada receive 27 times less news coverage than white women; they also receive "dispassionate and less-detailed, headlines, articles, and images".

=== United Kingdom ===
In January 2006, the London Metropolitan Police Commissioner, Ian Blair, accused the media of institutional racism in its reporting of murders. He contrasted the reporting of the death of the male white lawyer Tom ap Rhys Pryce with the murder of the male Asian builders' merchant Balbir Matharu. He said "murders in minority communities do not seem to interest the mainstream media". He said that the death of Damilola Taylor, a 10-year-old black boy, was clearly an exception to this. He said he had been surprised at how much coverage the murders of two 10-year-old white girls in Soham had received.

University of Leicester Criminology Professor Yvonne Jewkes cites the murder of Milly Dowler, the murder of Sarah Payne, and the Soham murders as examples of "eminently newsworthy stories" about girls from "respectable" middle-class families and backgrounds whose parents used the news media effectively. She writes that, in contrast, the killing of Damilola Taylor, a 10-year-old boy from Nigeria, initially received little news coverage, with reports initially concentrating upon street crime levels and community policing in London, and largely ignoring the victim. Even when Damilola's father flew into the UK from Nigeria to make press statements and television appearances, the level of public outcry did not, Jewkes asserts, reach "the near hysterical outpourings of anger and sadness that accompanied the deaths of Sarah, Milly, Holly, and Jessica". According to BBC News, the killing of Damilola Taylor had shocked the UK.

Two cases of missing white girl syndrome that have been given as contrasting examples: the murder of Hannah Williams and the murder of Danielle Jones (both were white). It was suggested that Jones received more coverage than Williams because Jones was a middle-class schoolgirl, whilst Williams was from a working-class background with a stud in her nose and estranged parents. Another explanation for the difference in the coverage has been given: the eroticisation of the victim by news reports about a sexual relationship between Jones and her murderer, her uncle. A 2023 report by Missing People said cases of missing Black and Asian people are less likely to be solved.

=== South Africa ===
Sandile Memela, chief director for social cohesion at South Africa's Department of Arts and Culture, noted amidst the Oscar Pistorius trial that there existed substantial differences between how media outlets reported on the murders of Reeva Steenkamp and Zanele Khumalo; two South African models, respectively white and black, who had been murdered by their boyfriends under nearly identical circumstances. Memela asserted that the discrepancy between the media coverage of the Steenkamp and Khumala murders amounted to "structural racism" within South African society, and stated: "As a country we seem to have chosen to ignore the agony, pain and suffering of the Khumalo family for no other reason than that they are black." On September 11, 2014, the South African news network SABC3 aired an investigative report which raised concerns around the "Missing White Woman Syndrome"; where the death of Steenkamp was juxtaposed with the death of Zanele Khumalo.

== Analogous cases that do not involve missing persons ==
=== Jessica Lynch ===
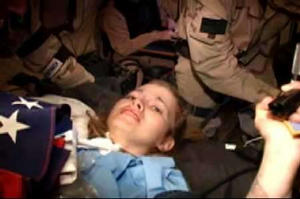
News coverage of Jessica Lynch's rescue

Social commentaries pointed to media bias in the coverage of soldier Jessica Lynch versus that of her fellow soldiers, Shoshana Johnson and Lori Piestewa. All three were ambushed in the same attack during the Iraq War on March 23, 2003, with Piestewa being killed, and Lynch and Johnson being injured and taken prisoner. Lynch, a young, blonde white woman, received far more media coverage than Johnson, a black single mother, and Piestewa, an Indigenous Hopi single mother from an impoverished background, with media critics suggesting that the media gave more attention to the woman with whom audiences supposedly more readily identify. Lynch herself leveled harsh criticism at this disproportionate coverage that focused only on her, stating in a congressional testimony before the United States House Committee on Oversight and Government Reform:

I am still confused as to why they chose to lie and tried to make me a legend when the real heroics of my fellow soldiers that day were, in fact, legendary. People like Lori Piestewa and First Sergeant Dowdy who picked up fellow soldiers in harm's way. Or people like Patrick Miller and Sergeant Donald Walters who actually fought until the very end. The bottom line is the American people are capable of determining their own ideals of heroes and they don't need to be told elaborate tales.

=== Presumed kidnapping of "blonde angel" in Greece ===
In October 2013, a girl estimated to be about four years of age was found in the custody of a Roma couple in Greece and was presumed to have been abducted. The story about the "blonde angel" and the search for her biological parents received international media coverage. A Romani rights activist commented on the case to say "imagine if the situation were reversed and the children were brown and the parents were white". The child was later identified as Maria Ruseva. Her biological mother was a Bulgarian Roma who gave Maria up for adoption.

=== Murder trial defendants ===
Critics have also cited excessive media coverage of murder trials where the defendant is female, white, young and attractive, and included them along with missing white woman syndrome instances in an all-encompassing narrative nicknamed the "woman in jeopardy" or "damsel in distress" genre. In such cases, the media will focus on the accused, rather than the victim as in Missing White Woman Syndrome cases, and they will be more ambiguous about their guilt than in other criminal cases regardless of evidence. Cited examples include Amanda Knox, Jodi Arias and Casey Anthony.

== Laws named after missing white women and girls ==
Several laws have been created in the aftermath of disappearance cases, and are sometimes informally named after the missing person. Commentators have observed that disappearances of white women give rise to such laws more often than missing non-white women or missing men. Such laws in the United States include Lori's Law (named after Lori Hacking), Megan's Law (Megan Kanka), Jessica's Law (Jessica Lunsford), and Caylee's Law (Caylee Anthony).

== Examples ==
The following missing-person cases have been cited as instances of missing-white-woman syndrome by media commentators. The commentators stated that these missing persons garnered a disproportionate level of media coverage relative to non-white, or less-wealthy, or male missing persons.

Date of disappearance or death	Name	Description	Ref.
February 27, 1992	Kimberly Pandelios	A 20-year-old woman who disappeared after leaving to respond to a model-wanted ad at the Angeles National Forest. The case was publicized in a 1995 episode of Unsolved Mysteries.	
September 24, 1992	Dail Dinwiddie	A 23-year-old college student who disappeared after attending a U2 concert. She remains missing.	
October 1, 1993	Polly Klaas	A 12-year-old girl who was found murdered. Her murderer was convicted and sentenced to death.	
November 16, 1995	Linda Sobek	A 27-year-old model and former Los Angeles Raiders cheerleader who disappeared while on assignment. Salacious details of the case were printed in the national media. Her murderer was convicted and sentenced to life imprisonment.	
May 25, 1996	Kristin Smart	A 19-year-old college student disappeared on campus of California Polytechnic State University. Her disappearance resulted in state legislation, including the Kristin Smart Campus Security Act.	
December 25, 1996	JonBenét Ramsey	A 6-year-old girl who was killed in her family's home.	
June 23, 1997	Kristen Modafferi	An 18-year-old college student who disappeared from the San Francisco Bay Area, and as of 2023, remains missing. Her disappearance, just 3 weeks after her 18th birthday, helped to establish Kristen's Law and the National Center for Missing Adults.	
June 27, 2000	Molly Bish	A 16-year-old girl who disappeared after being dropped off at her lifeguarding job. Her remains were not found for three years, despite extensive searching and publicity.	
July 1, 2000	Sarah Payne	An 8-year-old girl who was abducted from a cornfield while playing with her siblings. Her death led to the government allowing limited access to the sex offender registry.	
June 18, 2001	Danielle Jones	A 15-year-old girl murdered by her uncle; her body has never been recovered.	
May 1, 2001	Chandra Levy	A 24-year-old intern disappeared while she had an affair with married representative Gary Condit.	
January 10, 2002	Rachel Cooke	A 19-year-old college student who disappeared while jogging in Georgetown, Texas. Her disappearance was publicized nationally, but she is still missing.	
February 1, 2002	Danielle van Dam	A 7-year-old girl who disappeared from her bedroom.	
March 21, 2002	Amanda "Milly" Dowler	A 13-year-old girl who disappeared after school. Her remains were found after an extensive six-month search, and the case played a significant role in the News of the World phone-hacking scandal.	
June 5, 2002	Elizabeth Smart	A 14-year-old girl, missing for 9 months after being in captivity. Her captor was sentenced to life in prison.	
August 4, 2002	Jessica Chapman	Two 10-year-old girls murdered while returning from a shopping trip.	
August 4, 2002	Holly Wells	Two 10-year-old girls murdered while returning from a shopping trip.	
August 29, 2002	Audrey Herron	A 31-year-old woman and mother of three who disappeared after leaving work.	
December 24, 2002	Laci Peterson	A 27-year-old pregnant woman murdered by her husband Scott Peterson. The case led to the implementation of "Laci and Connor's Law", which defines violence against a pregnant woman as violence against two separate legal subjects (the mother and the unborn child).	
March 23, 2003	Jessica Lynch	A 19-year-old Private First Class injured and taken prisoner at the Battle of Nasiriyah.	
November 22, 2003	Dru Sjodin	A 22-year-old student who was found murdered. Her murderer was convicted, and the case prompted the Dru Sjodin National Sex Offender Public Registry.	
February 1, 2004	Carlie Brucia	An 11-year-old girl who was kidnapped from a car wash and later murdered. The surveillance video showing the kidnapping gained nationwide attention.	
March 27, 2004	Audrey Seiler	A 20-year-old college student who was found alive after an extensive search; it was later revealed she had fabricated the incident.	
May 24, 2004	Brooke Wilberger	A 19-year-old student who was abducted and murdered. Her murderer revealed the location of her body and was convicted.	
July 19, 2004	Lori Hacking	A 27-year-old woman murdered by her husband.	
February 24, 2005	Jessica Lunsford	A 9-year-old girl abducted from her home and later murdered. Her death led to more restrictive monitoring of sex offenders, known as Jessica's Law.	
April 26, 2005	Jennifer Wilbanks	A 32-year-old woman who fabricated her disappearance to avoid marriage.	
May 30, 2005	Natalee Holloway	An 18-year-old American high school graduate who disappeared in Aruba. Her disappearance resulted in an international media sensation, the coverage contributed to the term "missing white woman syndrome" being brought into greater public awareness. She was declared legally dead on January 12, 2012.	
September 5, 2005	Taylor Behl	A 17-year-old Virginia Commonwealth University freshman who disappeared and was later found dead. Her murderer was convicted.	
October 7, 2006	Michelle Gardner-Quinn	A 21-year-old undergraduate at the University of Vermont who disappeared and was later found dead. Her murderer was convicted.	
February 9, 2007	Tara Grant	A 35-year-old woman murdered by her husband.	
May 3, 2007	Madeleine McCann	A 3-year-old girl who disappeared from her parents' hotel room during a family holiday in Portugal. Described by The Daily Telegraph as "the most heavily reported missing-person case in modern history". The case remains unsolved.	
June 16, 2008	Caylee Anthony	A 2-year-old girl reported missing in Florida by her grandmother after 31 days. After her mother was controversially acquitted of her murder, several American states passed or proposed versions of "Caylee's Law", making it a felony for parents to fail to report their children missing to authorities.	
January 24, 2009	Marta del Castillo	A 17-year-old Spanish middle-class high school student who disappeared in Seville, Andalusia. Despite extensive searches and the conviction of her killer, her body has never been found.	
February 9, 2009	Haleigh Cummings	A 5-year-old girl kidnapped from her father's trailer in Satsuma, Florida.	
October 5, 2009	Aisling Symes	A 2-year-old girl who disappeared from her home in Auckland, New Zealand. She was feared abducted; shortly after, her body was found in a drain near her home a week later. It was determined that she was the victim of accidental drowning, after wandering off from her mother's side while she was carrying out household chores. Tim Hulme, writing for The Sunday Star-Times, surmised that age was a much greater factor than race or class in the extensive media coverage the case garnered.	
April 13, 2011	Holly Bobo	A 20-year-old nursing student who disappeared from her home in Darden, Tennessee. Her remains were found in September 2014. Two men have been charged with her murder and kidnapping.	
June 3, 2011	Lauren Spierer	A 20-year-old Indiana University student who disappeared after a night of drinking. She remains missing.	
August 3, 2013	Hannah Anderson	A 16-year-old California high school student who was kidnapped by a family friend after cheerleading practice. She was found in Idaho after a weeklong national search.	
September 13, 2014	Hannah Graham	An 18-year-old University of Virginia student who was kidnapped and murdered by an acquaintance. Her remains were found approximately five weeks after her disappearance.	
August 22, 2016	Diana Quer	An 18-year-old girl from a wealthy Madrid family who disappeared while vacationing in A Pobra do Caramiñal, Galicia.	
November 2, 2016	Sherri Papini	A 34-year-old woman from Redding, California, faked her abduction in order to spend time with her ex-boyfriend.	
July 16, 2018	Mollie Tibbetts	20-year-old who disappeared while jogging near her home in Brooklyn, Iowa. Her body was discovered over a month later on August 21.	
October 15, 2018	Jayme Closs	A 13-year-old girl was abducted from the Barron, Wisconsin home of her parents, both of whom were killed during the incident. She escaped her captor 88 days later.	
December 1, 2018	Grace Millane	A 22-year-old British tourist from a wealthy family who disappeared while visiting New Zealand. Her body was discovered in a rural area of Auckland just over one week after she went missing. A man was subsequently convicted of her murder.	
March 3, 2021	Sarah Everard	A 33-year-old white British middle-class woman who disappeared after leaving a friend's house in London. On March 10, police searching woodland at Great Chart in Kent found human remains. Two days later, it was confirmed to be the body of Everard.	
September 11, 2021	Gabby Petito	A 22-year-old American woman from Suffolk County, New York, who was reported missing while traveling across the United States with her fiancé. Her family lost contact with her in late August when she was in or near Grand Teton National Park in Wyoming.	
September 2, 2022	Eliza Fletcher	A 34-year-old kindergarten teacher from an upper-class family who disappeared while jogging in Memphis, Tennessee. Her abductor and killer was identified and imprisoned.	
January 1, 2023	Ana Walshe	A 39-year-old Serbian-American woman from Cohasset, Massachusetts, who disappeared early in the morning on New Year's Day.	
January 27, 2023	Nicola Bulley	A 45-year-old British woman from St Michael's on Wyre, Lancashire who disappeared while she was walking her dog.	
February 1, 2026	Nancy Guthrie	An 84-year-old mother of NBC News journalist and Today co-anchor Savannah Guthrie who disappeared from her home, with evidence indicating possible abduction or foul play.	

== See also ==
- Institutional racism – Racial discrimination as a policy within a society or organisation
- Male expendability – Hypothesis in anthropology
- Mean world syndrome – Perceiving the world to be more dangerous than it really is
- Media bias – Bias within the mass media
- Media feeding frenzy – Heightened media coverage of a story
- Operation Identify Me – Interpol investigation launched in 2023
- White privilege – Societal privilege based on skin lightness
- Missing and Murdered Indigenous Women
