= Murder of Leanne Tiernan =

High-profile murder case in the United Kingdom

Leanne Tiernan
- Tiernan, c. 1998
- Born: 27 September 1984; Metropolitan Borough of Leeds, West Yorkshire, England
- Died: 26 November 2000 (aged 16); Bramley, West Yorkshire, England
- Cause of death: Strangulation
- Body discovered: 20 August 2001, Otley, West Yorkshire
- Resting place: Hill Top Cemetery, Armley, West Yorkshire; 53.8015°N 1.6143°W (approximate)
- Occupation: Student
- Known for: Former missing person Victim of murder
- Parents: Michael Tiernan (father); Sharon Hawkhead (mother)

The murder of Leanne Tiernan was an English child murder involving a 16-year-old schoolgirl who was abducted less than one mile from her home on 26 November 2000, while returning from a Christmas shopping trip in Leeds, West Yorkshire, and subsequently murdered. The missing person inquiry for Tiernan that followed was one of the largest in the history of West Yorkshire Police, involving the search of around 1,750 buildings, underwater searches of thirty-two drainage wells, the draining of a two-mile section of a canal and the halting of household waste collections.

Tiernan's body was discovered on 20 August 2001, in dense woodland just 50 yards (46 m) from a busy car park at Lindley Woods near Otley, on the border of North and West Yorkshire. Following the discovery of her body, DNA samples were taken from 200 people, including family, friends and known sex offenders living in the area. Forensic evidence led police to her killer, John Taylor, who lived only 1,300 yards (1,200 m) from Tiernan's home. On 8 July 2002, Taylor pleaded guilty at Leeds Crown Court to her kidnap and murder and received two life sentences, with the trial judge telling him that he should expect to spend the rest of his life in prison. At the end of his trial, the police officers who brought him to justice spoke of their belief that he may have been responsible for other unsolved murders, including the 1992 murder of Yvonne Fitt, a Bradford sex worker.

On 3 April 2003, following a police review of unsolved sexual attacks in the area, Taylor pleaded guilty to two separate rapes committed before the schoolgirl's murder and received a further sentence of life imprisonment with a recommended minimum of 30 years. As a result of the Tiernan murder inquiry, police re-opened at least ten further cold case murder investigations.

== Abduction and missing person inquiry ==
Leanne Tiernan (27 September 1984 – 26 November 2000), a pupil at West Leeds High School, was last seen alive at 4:50 p.m. on 26 November 2000, when she and her friend, 15-year-old Sarah Whitehouse, returned to Bramley by bus after a shopping trip to Leeds city centre. The girls parted company at Houghley Lane, and Whitehouse last saw her setting off along an unlit path through an area of wooded wasteland known as Houghley Gill. When Whitehouse arrived home, she telephoned Tiernan's home and was surprised to find she was not there. At 5:20 p.m., Tiernan's mother rang her mobile phone to find out where she was, but the phone rang out for some time and then cut off. When she rang it again, it was cut off after four rings. At 7:00 p.m., she rang the police and reported her daughter as a missing person.

The police immediately began a missing person inquiry, headed by Detective Superintendent Chris Gregg, and a search of the area where Tiernan was last seen was undertaken, although no trace of her was found. As the inquiry progressed, it became one of the largest ever undertaken by West Yorkshire Police, involving up to 200 officers and hundreds of volunteers.

More than 1,400 house-to-house inquiries were conducted, and 800 houses along her probable route—designated by the police as "Red Route"—were searched, along with 800 sheds, garages and outbuildings and 150 commercial premises within a half-mile radius of Houghley Gill. DNA samples were taken from 140 men interviewed by the police in connection with the inquiry and twelve search warrants were executed at various addresses in Leeds. The West Yorkshire Police Underwater Search unit carried out a search of a three-mile section of the Leeds and Liverpool Canal between Spring Garden lock and Bramley Falls, two miles of which was drained to a depth of one metre. The unit also searched thirty-two drain shafts in the area and Yorkshire Water was called in to help locate disused and abandoned drains and wells.

Collections of household waste were halted temporarily to allow police to search all bins in the area for evidence. The inquiry also received assistance from British Waterways, British Transport Police, the Ministry of Defence’s aerial reconnaissance department, Calder Valley Search and Rescue Team, Interpol and the Police National Search Centre, a joint police and military training facility. On 3 December 2000, police staged a reconstruction of the girls' last movements, reenacted by Sarah Whitehouse and Tiernan's older sister Michelle, in the hope of jogging the memory of potential witnesses about Leanne's movements. Detectives also sent text messages to Tiernan's mobile phone, which was now switched off, but had briefly been activated on 27 November 2000. A local businessman offered a £10,000 reward for information leading to her safe return, and supermarket chain Iceland printed her picture and details on milk cartons sold at its stores nationwide.

There were unconfirmed reports of sightings as far away as Doncaster and Blackpool, but after nine months, there had been no positive sightings. Tiernan's boyfriend, care assistant Wayne Keeley, 19, pleaded with her to get in touch. On 4 December 2000, police released an E-FIT facial composite of a man who had been seen walking a dog in the Houghley Gill area shortly before Tiernan disappeared. He was described as being "5 feet 8 inches tall and of stocky build with a round, reddish face that may possibly be scarred... wearing a black woollen hat, a three-quarter-length waterproof jacket and dirty jeans."

== Discovery of body ==
On 20 August 2001, Tiernan's body was found by Mark Bisson, who was walking his two dogs in Lindley Woods, North Yorkshire, 100 yards (91 m) from where another murder victim, Yvonne Fitt, had been discovered buried in 1992. Tiernan was identified from her fingerprints on 22 August 2001, and Det. Supt. Gregg announced that the inquiry had now become a murder investigation, codenamed Operation Conifer. Tiernan's body had been wrapped inside nine green plastic bin bags secured with twine, with a black bin bag secured around her head with a leather dog collar, then placed inside a floral-patterned duvet cover.

Tiernan's Ellesse coat and black boots were not found. Plastic cable ties had been used as a ligature to strangle her and more ties had been used to bind her hands. A dark coloured scarf was also wrapped around her neck. Her hair was still tied in a ponytail with the same band and hairclips that she had been wearing when she disappeared.

The state of decomposition of Tiernan's body led some forensic experts to believe that after her death she had been kept in cold storage or a freezer up until a few weeks before the body was found, in part to avoid detection and in part as a trophy. A cryobiology expert was called in to examine the microstructure of Tiernan's cardiac tissue, and concluded that the body could have been kept frozen for some time, taking into account the air temperatures for the months between her disappearance and the discovery of the body.

Police made a public appeal for anyone who might have been in Lindley Woods recently or had information about others who regularly visited the area to come forward and contact police.

== Perpetrator ==
John Taylor (born 27 August 1956, Leeds, West Riding of Yorkshire) was a parcel delivery worker for Parcelforce, and lived on the same housing estate as Tiernan, within a mile of where she was last seen alive. He was known locally as "the pet man," as he kept a number of dogs and ferrets and sold pet food, and was also known to be a poacher. His only previous conviction was for theft of a suit when he was 15 years old, and he was considered by his neighbours to be trustworthy and "ordinary". Following their appeal for information, Taylor's name was given to the police separately by two former girlfriends of Taylor who had met him through lonely hearts columns, both saying that he had driven past the woods in their company and boasted of poaching there regularly.

=== Inquiries into Taylor's background ===
As police began to conduct thorough inquiries into Taylor's background, they discovered that he was a frequent user of lonely hearts advertisements. Through his telephone records they identified the women he had contacted in this way and began to interview them. One woman who had dated Taylor disclosed that Taylor told her he liked tying women up and locking them in a cupboard. Another said that Taylor had told her that he had a fetish for "bondage, whips and ties," and said that he wanted to tie up her daughter with cable ties and have sexual intercourse with her. A former girlfriend, who had briefly lived with Taylor, told police that she had often visited Lindley Woods with him while they were dating, and that she had eventually broke off the relationship with him because of his bondage fetish and the feeling "that she was being raped." When asked by police to describe how Taylor would tie her, she described his practice of securing a plastic cable tie around each of her wrists, then tying her hands behind her back by using a third cable tie to link them. This was exactly how Tiernan had been found. She also said that Taylor kept a bundle of the cable ties in a drawer next to his bed. Two other women also said that Taylor enjoyed bondage during sex, and had bound their breasts and hands with cable ties.

=== Forensic evidence linking Taylor to Tiernan ===
- The leather dog collar found on Tiernan's body was manufactured by a company, Armitage, based in Nottingham who sold it to 220 separate wholesalers. Detective Constable David Wilson began contacting each of them to ask if they had records of sales to anyone in the Leeds area. The 112th company contacted was a Liverpool-based mail order company called Pets Pyjamas who confirmed that they had made three sales in the area, and emailed a list to DC Wilson. Taylor's name was one of the customers, and this was immediately flagged up for attention as a name previously provided following the appeal by Det. Supt. Gregg.
- Scientists at the Forensic Science Service (FSS) examined the scarf which had been tied around Tiernan's neck and found a hair caught in the knot which did not belong to her. The FSS were unable to extract a DNA profile from the hair's root using conventional DNA tests, so they carried out mitochondrial DNA testing within the shaft of the hair. This provided a DNA profile which matched Taylor's.
- FSS examination of the twine showed that it was of a unique type only manufactured by a company in Devon, England. They usually only supplied products to the Ministry of Defence but a small "one-off" batch had been sold to the public for use as rabbit catch nets. This batch was an exact match for the twine used on Tiernan's body and also subsequently found at Taylor's home.
- The yellow cable ties found on Tiernan's body were identified as being manufactured by an Italian company who sold 99% of them to the Royal Mail, of which Taylor's employer Parcelforce was a subsidiary. The same cable ties were found in Taylor's home when it was searched by police.
- Pieces of green plastic identical to that which had been used to wrap the body were found in Taylor's home.
- Traces of red nylon carpet fibres were found on Tiernan's clothing, which the FSS described as very distinctive, due to the unusual way in which the fibre had been dyed. When police searched Taylor's home, they discovered that he had recently removed all carpeting from the house and burned it, but small traces of fibres matching those on the body were found caught on nails in the floorboards.
- The FSS employed an expert in forensic pollen analysis who was able to demonstrate that Tiernan had been in Taylor's garden just before she was killed based on the distinctive types of pollen found in her nasal cavity, on her skin and in her hair.

=== Arrest of Taylor ===
Taylor, who lived alone after his wife had divorced him in 1996, was arrested on suspicion of murder on 16 October 2001. Police immediately sealed off his house and gardens and a patch of wasteland to the rear of the property. The gardens were then excavated and the property, including three large chest freezers, subjected to a rigorous examination over a period of ten days.

When interviewed by police, Taylor said that he had picked Tiernan up by the scarf around her neck, at which point she had died, and claimed that her death was an accident. He said he had panicked and hidden her body in Lindley Woods.

The police and prosecution maintained that he cable tied her hands behind her back in the bedroom in preparation for rape, and then used a cable tie as a ligature to murder her when her blindfold slipped and she saw his face. When asked why he had abducted Tiernan, he replied: "I have no idea." When police challenged his version of taking the body to Lindley Woods soon after the murder, he claimed that he had first kept the body hidden underneath pallets in his back garden, and then stored her inside his sofa.

== Trial ==
On 15 February 2002, Taylor appeared before Mr. Justice Poole at Leeds Crown Court and entered a plea of guilty with respect to the abduction of Leanne Tiernan. He was not asked to enter a plea on the charge of murder, pending a separate Newton hearing, and was remanded into custody awaiting the trial. On 8 July 2002, the first day of the trial, he entered a plea of guilty with respect to the murder of Leanne Tiernan. He was sentenced the same day, and Mr. Justice Astill, said:

After the death of this girl at your hands you wanted sexual deviancy with a girl of similar age. That not only demonstrates how dangerous you are but demonstrates your lack of remorse. Not by chance were you in this area for this purpose. You were not acting on impulse, you chose a secluded place and a vulnerable young girl who suited your purposes. This was as cold and calculating as can be imagined. You are a dangerous sexual sadist. Your purpose in kidnapping this young girl was so that you could satisfy your perverted cravings. The suffering you caused her and the suffering you continue to cause those who loved her simply cannot be measured. You must expect to spend the rest of your life in custody.

Taylor was sentenced to the mandatory term of life imprisonment. However, his sentence was later set as a minimum of 20 years by The Lord Woolf, then presiding as the Lord Chief Justice of England and Wales, meaning that Taylor is not among the prisoners who have been issued with a whole life tariff and who are unlikely ever to be released. Until November 2002, the Home Secretary had been responsible for deciding when or if a life sentence prisoner could be considered for parole, but a legal challenge by another convicted murderer resulted in the judiciary being given full responsibility for making these decisions.

At the conclusion of the trial Det. Supt. Gregg announced: "We do not believe that this is the first major crime he has committed. We feel that the way this murder was pre-planned, and the way he hid and disposed of the body, was calculated. We cannot exclude the possibility he has killed before".

=== Subsequent convictions for rape ===
As the police now had Taylor's DNA profile they were able to review other unsolved sex attacks in the locality where forensic evidence was still available for DNA extraction. Two rapes in particular stood out as they had both been committed on the estate where Taylor lived. The first took place on 18 October 1988, when a 32-year-old woman was attacked as she walked across Houghley Gill to collect her children from school. Taylor, who was wearing a mask and armed with a knife, forced her to carry out oral sex and then raped her. The second rape took place on 1 March 1989, when Taylor, again masked and wielding a knife, broke into the home of a 21-year-old woman in the middle of the day. He forced her into the bedroom, where he undressed her, blindfolded and gagged her, and then forced her to commit oral sex before raping her. Her small child was present in the house at the time. Taylor was formally rearrested in October 2002 and charged with the rapes. Although Taylor initially refused to cooperate with the police, the DNA evidence was overwhelming, and he eventually pleaded guilty to both rapes on 4 February 2003 at Leeds Crown Court. Judge Norman Jones QC, the Recorder of Leeds, sentenced him to two terms of life imprisonment and "expressly dis-applied early release provisions". Det. Supt. Gregg said: "We are still concerned that there may be other victims and families who have been affected by Taylor's actions" and revealed that a diamante necklace found in his car at the time of his 2001 arrest may have belonged to another victim as they were still unable to find out from where it came or to who it belonged. Taylor is known to have travelled across the country to meet women he had contacted through personal ads and also in his parcel delivery work, and with the solving of the two rape cases, police discounted his insistence that Tiernan's murder was an isolated case and that he had taken his dog for a walk and "just snapped". They maintained that Taylor could have been a serial sex attacker for twenty years leading up to his arrest.

Taylor has denied involvement in any other crimes. However, on 26 October 2018, he was sentenced to a whole life order for a series of other rapes and sexual assaults, meaning that he is now unlikely ever to be released.

=== Minimum term ===
Under the Criminal Justice Act 2003 Taylor's sentence for the murder of Tiernan was reviewed by the High Court of Justice with regard to the minimum term served before consideration for parole. On 19 December 2006, Mr Justice Openshaw set the minimum term at 30 years. In his judgement he stated:

I am anxious that this sentence is not misunderstood or misreported. The sentence is, and remains, a sentence of imprisonment for life. The defendant may not even be considered for release for this offence of murder until he has served at least 30 years. That is not to say that he will then be released, for the whole life term imposed for the rapes remains in force. Furthermore, the defendant will be detained unless and until the Parole Board is satisfied that he no longer presents a risk to the public. Many prisoners, and surely John Taylor is likely to be one, are in fact detained for many years after their tariff has expired, indeed it may be that he presents such a risk that he could never safely be released, but that is for others to decide in due course. I am just anxious that no one thinks that I am suggesting that he be released in 30 years for I most certainly am not.

Taylor is imprisoned at HM Prison Wakefield.

== Cold cases reopened ==
As a direct result of the Tiernan murder inquiry, West Yorkshire Police reopened the murder investigations of:

- Deborah Alison Wood (aged 20) whose body was found burning near Burley Park railway station, Leeds, in January 1996. Police believe her body had been kept in cold storage. She was found wrapped in bin bags and bedding.
- Yvonne Fitt (aged 33) whose body was found in Lindley Woods in September 1992. She had been missing since January 1992.
- Lindsay Rimer (aged 13) who disappeared not far from her home in Hebden Bridge in November 1994. Her body was found at the bottom of a canal two miles from her home five months later. The cause of death was strangulation.
- Rebecca Hall (aged 19) who disappeared 13 April 2001. Her body was found in an alley behind a car park in Bradford on 26 April 2001.

Strathclyde Police reopened the murder investigations of five Glasgow sex workers:

- Diane McInally (aged 23), who was murdered in October 1991.
- Karen McGregor (aged 26), who was murdered in April 1993.
- Leona McGovern (aged 22), who was murdered in June 1995.
- Marjorie Roberts (aged 34), who was murdered in August 1995.
- Tracey Wylde (aged 21), who was murdered in November 1997.

Police also identified Taylor as a suspect in the attempted murder of 27-year-old Glasgow prostitute Alison Wallace in July 2000.

== In the media ==
=== Television ===
The murder of Leanne Tiernan has been the subject of several television documentaries:

- Looking for Leanne (2002) – Produced by Katherine Blair for Yorkshire Television, this documentary focused on the police and forensic experts who built the case against Taylor. It was first broadcast in Britain on 9 July 2002 by Yorkshire ITV1.
- Killer in the Woods (2003) – Produced and directed by Jessica Fowle for True North Productions, this 48 minute programme was first broadcast on 25 February 2003 by Five and featured exclusive footage of Taylor's police interviews.
- Forensic Files S09E11 "Making The Collar" (2004) – First broadcast in the US on 27 August 2004 by truTV.
- Real Crime S04E03 "Girlsnatcher" (2004) – Produced and directed by Rick Goodwin for Yorkshire Television, it was first broadcast on 28 March 2004 by ITV1. The programme detailed the missing person inquiry and Taylor's history of sexual violence towards women.
- Crimewatch: How they caught... "The Leeds Strangler" (2009) – Originally broadcast as part of Crimewatch, the BBC's long-running and high-profile television programme that reconstructs major crimes.
- Someone's Daughter, Someone's Son S01E03 "The Murder of Leanne Tiernan" (2011) – First broadcast by Yorkshire ITV1 in 19 August 2011.
- A Town and Country Murder S03E08 "Leanne Tiernan" (2015) – First broadcast on the Crime and Investigation Channel on 3 June 2015.

== See also ==
- List of kidnappings
- List of solved missing person cases (2000s)
- Murder of Alice Gross
- Murder of Milly Dowler
- Murder of April Jones
- Murder of Danielle Jones
- Murder of Hannah Williams
- Murder of Tia Rigg
- Murder of Tia Sharp
- Soham murders
