= Child labour in Pakistan =

Child labour in Pakistan is the employment of children to work in Pakistan, which causes them mental, physical, moral and social harm. Child labour takes away the education from children. The Human Rights Commission of Pakistan estimated that in the 1990s, 11 million children were working in the country, half of whom were under age ten. In 1996, the median age for a child entering the work force was seven, down from eight in 1994. It was estimated that one quarter of the country's work force was made up of children. Child labor stands out as a significant issue in Pakistan, primarily driven by poverty. The prevalence of poverty in the country has compelled children to engage in labor, as it has become necessary for their families to meet their desired household income level, enabling them to afford basic necessities like butter and bread.

== Demographics ==
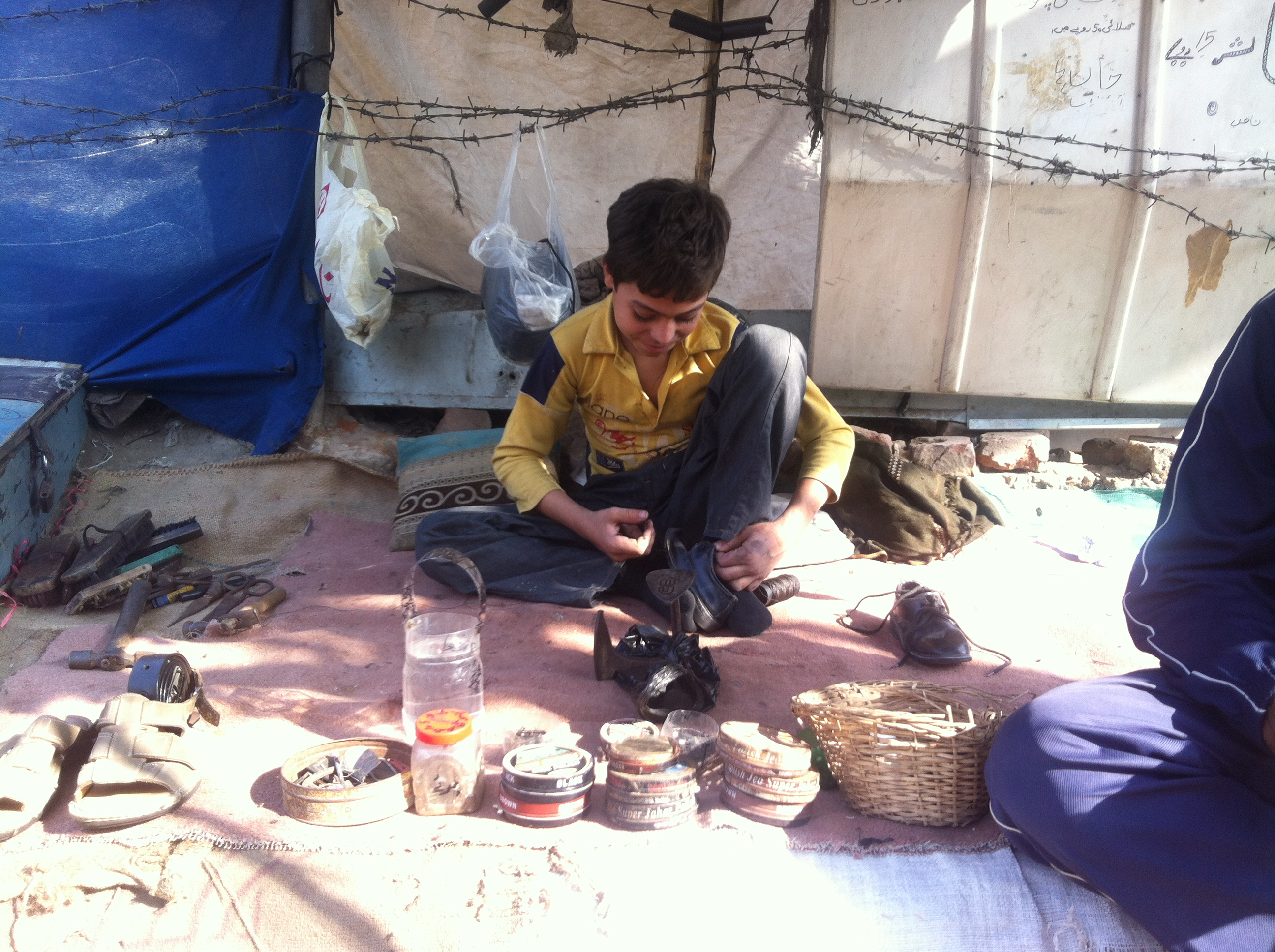
A Pakistani boy working as a cobbler

As of 2005–2006, it is estimated that 37 percent of working boys were employed in the wholesale and retail industry in urban areas, followed by 22 percent in the service industry and 22 percent in manufacturing. 48 percent of girls were employed in the service industry while 39 percent were employed in manufacturing. In rural areas, 68 percent of working boys were joined by 82 percent of working girls. In the wholesale and retail industry the percentage of girls was 11 percent followed by 11 percent in manufacturing.

Child labour in Pakistan is perhaps most rampant in the city of Multan, which is an important production centre for export goods.

For children working at brick kilns in Punjab, a survey was conducted by the Punjab Labour Department. According to the latest figures of the survey, the department identified 10,347 brick kilns in Punjab and a total of 126,779 children were seen at these sites. Out of the total, the survey identified that 32,727 children were not attending schools. For the school-going children, a total of 71,373 children were enrolled in public schools, of whom 41,017 were males and 30,356 were females. A total of 13,125 children were attending private schools; 7,438 were males and 5,687 were females. As many as 9,554 children were enrolled in non-formal education institutes.

== Causes ==
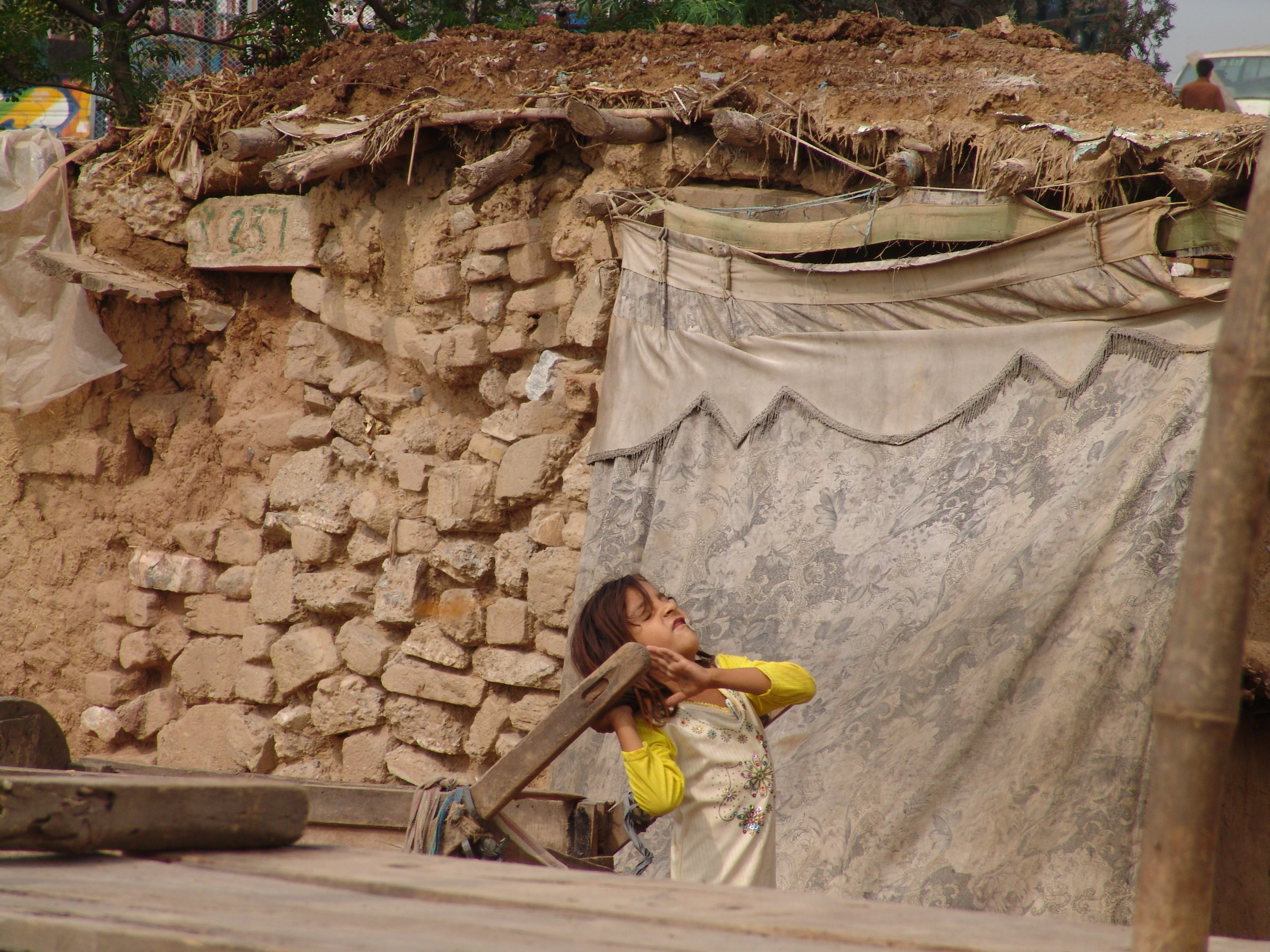
A Pakistani child labourer

The International Labour Organisation (ILO) suggests that poverty is the greatest single cause behind child labour. Pakistan has a per-capita income of approximately $1900. A middle class person in Pakistan earns around $6 a day on average. The average Pakistani has to feed nine or ten people with their daily wage. There is also a high inflation rate. As of 2008, 17.2% of the total population lives below the poverty line, which is the lowest figure in the history of Pakistan. Poverty levels appear to necessitate that children work in order to allow families to reach their target take-home pay.

The low cost of child labor gives manufacturers a significant advantage in the Western marketplace, where they undersell their competitors from countries which are prohibiting child labor.

According to research conducted by Akhtar, Fatima, & Sadaqt, the main causes of child labour in the fishing sector on the Balochistan coast were the low quality of education, lack of job prospects, and lack of progress in the region. It was found that in this particular province there are high dropout rates and low literacy rates. The researchers believe that policies focusing on bettering education will help reduce child labour. Pakistan ranks among the countries with the lowest literacy rates, and in recent years, child labor has seen a disturbing rise. The primary cause for the surge in child labor is the escalating poverty levels, with low literacy rates also playing a significant role in exacerbating this issue.

== Government steps on child labour ==
A number of laws contain provisions prohibiting child labour, or regulating the working conditions of child and adolescent workers. The most important laws are:

- The Factories Act 1934
- The West Pakistan Shops and Establishments Ordinance 1969
- The Employment of Children Act 1991
- The Bonded Labour System Abolition Act 1992
- The Punjab Compulsory Education Act 1994

Child labour remains one of the major problems afflicting Pakistan and its children. Pakistan has passed laws in an attempt to limit child labour and indentured servitude, but those laws are universally ignored. Some 11 million children, aged four to fourteen, keep the country's factories operating, often working in brutal and squalid conditions.

In December 2014, the U.S. Department of Labor's List of Goods Produced by Child Labor or Forced Labor reported nine goods, six of which are produced by child labourers in Pakistan. These include the making of bricks, carpets, glass bangles, leather and surgical instruments, as well as coal mining.

In July 2025, the Pakistani government proposed a Child Protection Policy to address child labour, trafficking, early marriage, malnutrition, and the impact of armed conflict on children. The policy, set for cabinet approval on July 8, aims to improve inter-departmental coordination through a Child Protection Technical Working Group.

Despite existing laws, millions of children in Pakistan continue to face exploitative labour, chronic malnutrition, and lack of education. The Sindh Child Protection Authority (SCPA) will lead implementation, though effective enforcement remains a critical concern amid the broader humanitarian crisis facing Pakistan’s vulnerable youth.

== Efforts to reduce child labour ==
NGO groups against child labour have been raising awareness of the exploitation of children in Pakistan. Several organizations are working in Pakistan to reduce child labour. Factories are now registered with provincial social security programs which offer free school facilities for children of workers and free hospital treatment.

=== Football stitching ===
By the late 1990s, Pakistan had come to account for 75 percent of total world production of footballs (or “soccer" balls in the US), and 71 percent of all soccer ball imports into the United States. The International Labour Rights Forum and allies called attention to rampant child labour in the soccer ball industry. According to investigations, thousands of children between the ages of 5 and 14 were putting in as many as 10 to 11 hours of stitching per day. The International Labour Organization, UNICEF, Save the Children, and the Sialkot Chamber of Commerce and Industry signed the Partners' Agreement to Eliminate Child Labour in the Soccer Industry in Pakistan on February 14, 1997, in Atlanta, Georgia.

=== Save the Children ===
Save the Children has also been working with some of the sporting goods manufacturers represented by the Sialkot Chamber of Commerce, and Industry and their international partner brands, represented by the World Federation of the Sporting Goods Industry. This joint effort is aimed at ensuring that children are not employed to stitch footballs. Save the Children (UK) includes disseminating information about child labour on major networks like CBS.

Save the Children has also worked on projects with the British Secretary of State for International Development to phase out child labour in Sialkot. The £750,000 donated by Britain will be spent on education and training, and also on setting up credit and savings schemes, in an attempt to provide alternatives to bonded labour.

=== SPARC ===
SPARC has conducted research that goes into producing its publications, including three major books on child labour, juvenile justice and child rights. Publications include its annual report "The State of Pakistan's Children", and a large number of brochures, SPARC has also conducted a number of research studies. SPARC has continued to ask successive governments to upgrade their laws to set a legal age limit for employment in Pakistan, although they have not been successful.

=== Other NGOs ===
Other NGOs that have worked on the issue of child labour in Pakistan include organisations such as UNICEF. UNICEF supported the NCCWD, drafting of the Child Protection Law and the Child Protection Policy, and initiated the establishment of the Child Protection Monitoring and Data Collecting System. Many other NGOs such as ROZAN, SPARC and Shaheen Welfare Trust have worked to protect children.

== Child labour death incidents ==
In January 2019, Uzma Bibi, a 16-year-old maid was allegedly tortured and murdered by her employer in Lahore for allegedly stealing a piece of meat.

An eight-year-old domestic worker Zohra Shah was killed by the couple Hasan Siddiqui & his wife Umm e Kulsoom for mistakenly releasing the couple's two parrots from the cage on 1 June 2020 in Rawalpindi, Pakistan. The couple were arrested and charged the same day.

A 10-year-old domestic worker, Fatima Furiro, was allegedly raped, tortured, and murdered by her employer, Asad Ali Shah Jeelani. Asad Shah and his wife, Hina Bibi, and father-in-law, Fayaz Shah, were arrested and charged.

== In popular culture ==
A film also made a debut named Gunjal on the child labour.The film features on the life of Iqbal Masih, who was a Child labour activist and murdered in 1995.

An animated film Under the Blaze on the child labour at bricks kiln is in pre-production.

== See also ==
- Labour force of Pakistan
- Iqbal Masih
- Gunjal
- Human rights in Pakistan
