= LaToya =

LaToya, Latoya, or La Toya may refer to:

- Latoya (given name), list of people with the given name
- La Toya Jackson (born 1956), American singer and member of the Jackson family
- La Toya (album) (also titled You're Gonna Get Rocked!), the fifth studio album by La Toya Jackson

== See also ==
- LaToyia Figueroa (1981–2005), American murder victim from Philadelphia
- LeToya Luckett (born 1981), American singer and former member of Destiny's Child
- Nadja LaToya Benaissa (born 1982), German singer and former member of No Angels
