= Labour in Pakistan =

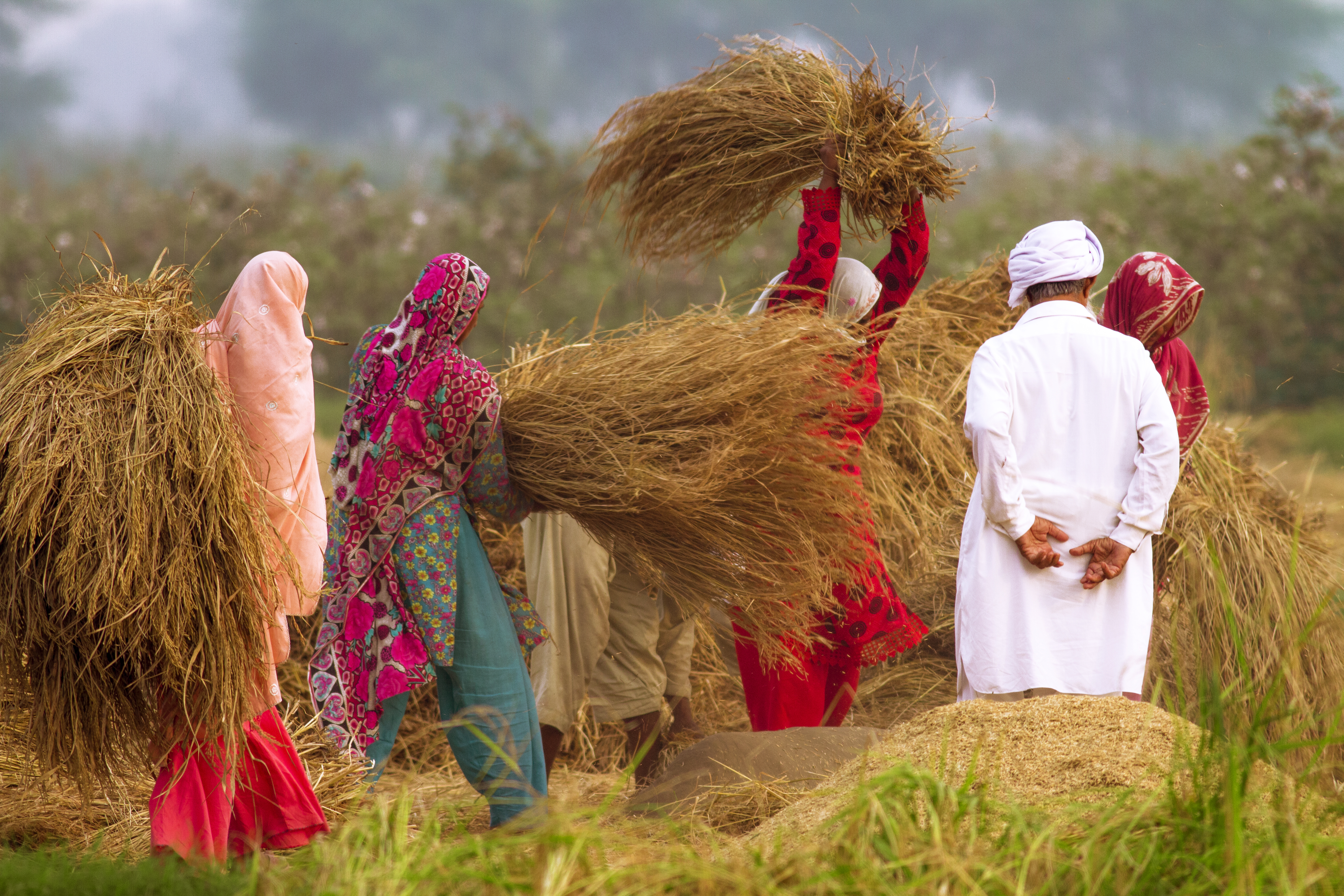
Agriculture employs almost half the labour force in Pakistan.

Pakistan has one of the largest labour and manpower forces in the world due to its large population, which is the fifth largest in the world. According to data produced by the CIA World Factbook, the Pakistan's labour force comprises 57.2 million people, making it the ninth largest country by available human workforce. About 43% of this labour is involved in agriculture, 20.3% in industry and the remaining 36.6% in other services.

Questions regarding the conditions under which Pakistan's blue-collar labourers work have often been raised by trade unions and workers' rights organisations. There is also controversial, yet widespread use of child labour in Pakistan. Along with other countries in the South Asia, Pakistan extensively exports much of its labour to nearby Persian Gulf countries of the Middle East.

In Pakistan, there exists a significant unemployment issue, resulting in numerous individuals being devoid of gainful employment opportunities. A considerable portion of available jobs carries inherent risks and dangers. Despite the perilous nature of such work, children are often compelled to undertake these tasks as it is often their only means of earning compensation to sustain both themselves and their families.

== Organization of labor in Pakistan ==
=== Pakistan's informal economy ===
About 72% of workers in Pakistan are part of the informal economy, working without following normal rules or regulations, which places them at risk of vulnerability and dangerous working conditions. Of all female workers, 78% are employed in the informal sector. The informal sector is the most vulnerable in terms of lack of job security, proper contracts, the enforcement of legal rights, and trade unions.

=== Public and private sector employment ===
Of the 28% of total workers that are formally employed, over 90% are in the private sector. As of 2026, the public sector employs around 7.3% of all workers in the formal economy. Public sector employees, on average, earn the highest compared to private sector employees and informal sector workers.The ratio of public to private sector pay was 1:1.5 in 2009 for men, and the gap was even larger for women in the public sector against women in the private sector.

=== Overseas employment ===
Remittances from Pakistani’s working overseas amount to 10% of the country’s GDP, setting a record breaking $38.3 billion in 2025.Placed in contrast to the country’s exporting of goods and services only amounting to $39 billion by comparison, overseas workers contribute a significant amount. As such, the Ministry of Overseas Pakistanis and Human Resource Development places specific emphasis on increasing the amount of overseas workers, majority of which are employed in Gulf countries.

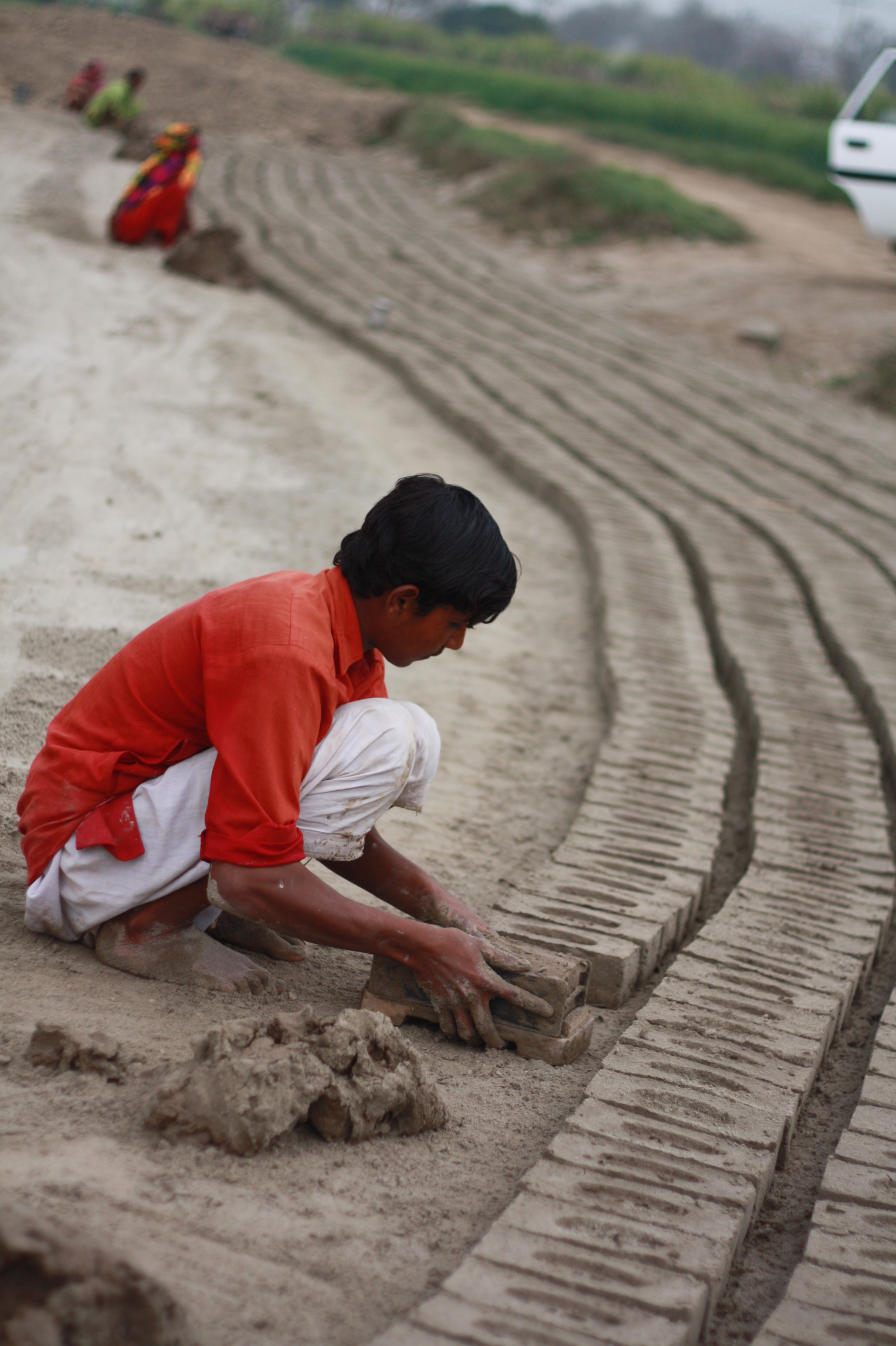
A teenage boy making bricks.

=== Bonded labor and slavery ===
Around 4 to 4.5 million people in Pakistan are subject to bonded labor across the country, and majority are either children with debt inherited from their parents, and religious minorities. Of the four million, 2.3 million are considered to be living under modern slavery, which includes forced labor and forced marriage.

Brick kilns, majority of which are located in isolated, rural areas, provide poor protection for workers and expose them to harm and abuse; those who manage to escape are often taken back by force and heavily fined to add to their debt. The case of Darshan Masih v. the State, where Asma Jahangir argued on behalf of a laborer seeking enforcement of his fundamental rights, made way for the Bonded Labor Abolition Act of 1992. However, the act has not been successfully implemented, and a major impediment to targeting the brick kilns is that influential politicians and their relatives own the kilns.

Ehsan Ullah Khan founded the Bonded Labor Liberation Front (BLLF) in the 1988, and later the Brick Kiln Workers Front. BLLF was responsible for freeing Iqbal Masih from a carpet weaving factory, who went on to become an activist and free thousands of other children from slavery until his assassination at only 12 years old.

== Labor rights abuse ==
As of 2024, Pakistan scores 53.5 on the Labour Rights Index placing it at ‘Basic Access to Decent Work.’ Workplaces are rife with abuse and a lack of safety and concern for workers; In 2012, a fire broke out at Ali Enterprises due to an absence of fire safety mechanisms, and managers chose to save merchandise over workers lives - the fire claimed the lives of 255 workers and injured 100.

Labour movements in Pakistan reached a crux from 1968 to 1972, when major strikes, mass mobilizations, uprisings, and shutdowns took place aiming to secure rights for workers. In the 1972 Karachi labour unrest, newly elected Zulfiqar Ali Bhutto, who disappointed workers by failing to deliver no anti-industrialist and socialist policies, punished the ones striking with mass arrests, violence, and even killings. The military dictatorship of Zia-ul-Haq that overthrew Bhutto intensified the repression of workers and unions, enabling employers to continue their mistreatment of workers.

Today, trade unions and organizers in Pakistan still struggle with union-busting: factory managers offer short term contracts to discourage participation in union activities, refuse full-time employment to union members, harass union representatives, install fake, corrupt unions to prevent unions from forming organically, and harshly punish striking workers, often in collusion with the police. In May 2017, workers at Khaadi began nationwide protests following the dismissal of 32 workers for attempting to enforce their rights under Pakistani labor law, demanding an end to mistreatment in the garment sector - such as long working hours, payment below minimum wage, and hazardous working condition. Even after a deal was reached with union leaders, labor activists reported that the issues persisted.

=== Child labour in Pakistan ===
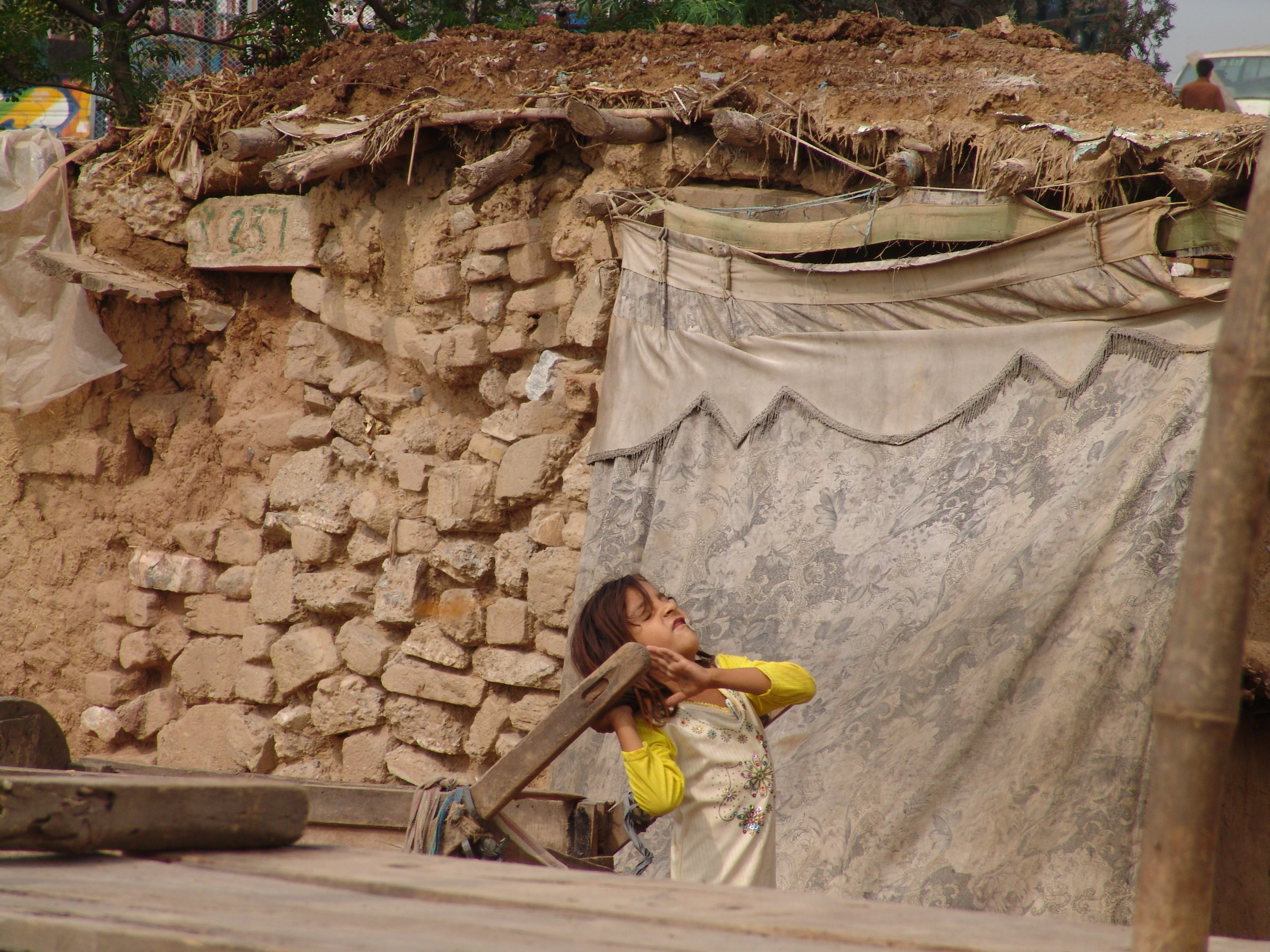
A child laborer working near a katchi abadi in Islamabad.

Article 11 of the Constitution of Pakistan prohibits children under 14 from hazardous employment, while Article 25-A mandates the compulsory education of children aged 5 to 16. The Employment of Children Act of 1991 added more restrictions to the employment of children in hazardous sectors and set out additional rights for workers aged 14 to 18. In the 2010s, provinces introduced their own laws limiting child labor and punishing its usage, such as the ICT Child Protection Act of 2018, Punjab Restriction of Employment of Children Act 2016 and Sindh Prohibition of Employment of Children Act, 2017.

In practice, however, these legal protections are rarely enforced and child labour remains a problem in Pakistan. A report from 2026, estimates that 8.6 million children from ages 5-17 are currently working in Pakistan, and data collected in 2023 establishes that at least 2.2 million are under 14. Human rights organizations in Pakistan point out that the nation's labor laws inadequately address the exploitation of children who, from a very young age, engage in work on the streets or within middle-class households.

The ongoing issue of child labor seems to be driven by chronic poverty and the vulnerability of low-income households, encouraging their children to work at a young age and a culture that has normalized child labor. Victims of child labor in Pakistan are also more vulnerable to physical violence and even sexual exploitation at the hands of their employers, with some extreme cases resulting in death, such as the killing of Zohra Shah.

== See also ==
- Ministry of Labour (Pakistan)
- Slavery in Pakistan
- Trade unions in Pakistan
