= Operation Conifer =

Operation Conifer may refer to:

- the 2001 investigation into the murder of Leanne Tiernan
- the police investigation into allegations that Edward Heath was a paedophile
