= Latoya (given name) =

Latoya is a feminine given name. Other variations of Latoya include Letoya. It is considered to be an African-American name in the United States.

== People with the given name Latoya ==
- LaToya London (born 1978), American R&B singer and former contestant on American Idol
- LaToya Cantrell (born 1972), American politician elected Mayor of New Orleans in 2017
- LaToya Thomas (born 1981), American professional basketball player with the WNBA
- La Toya Jackson (born 1956), American singer and member of the famous Jackson family
- LaToya Rodriguez (born 1983), American R&B singer
- LaToyia Figueroa (1981–2005), American murder victim from Philadelphia
- LeToya Luckett (born 1981), American singer and former member of Destiny's Child
- Kamara Latoya James (1984–2014), Olympic fencer
- Nadja LaToya Benaissa (born 1982), German singer and former member of No Angels

== See also ==
- Latoya (disambiguation)
- LaTonya, given name
