= One Montgomery Tower =

Office building in San Francisco

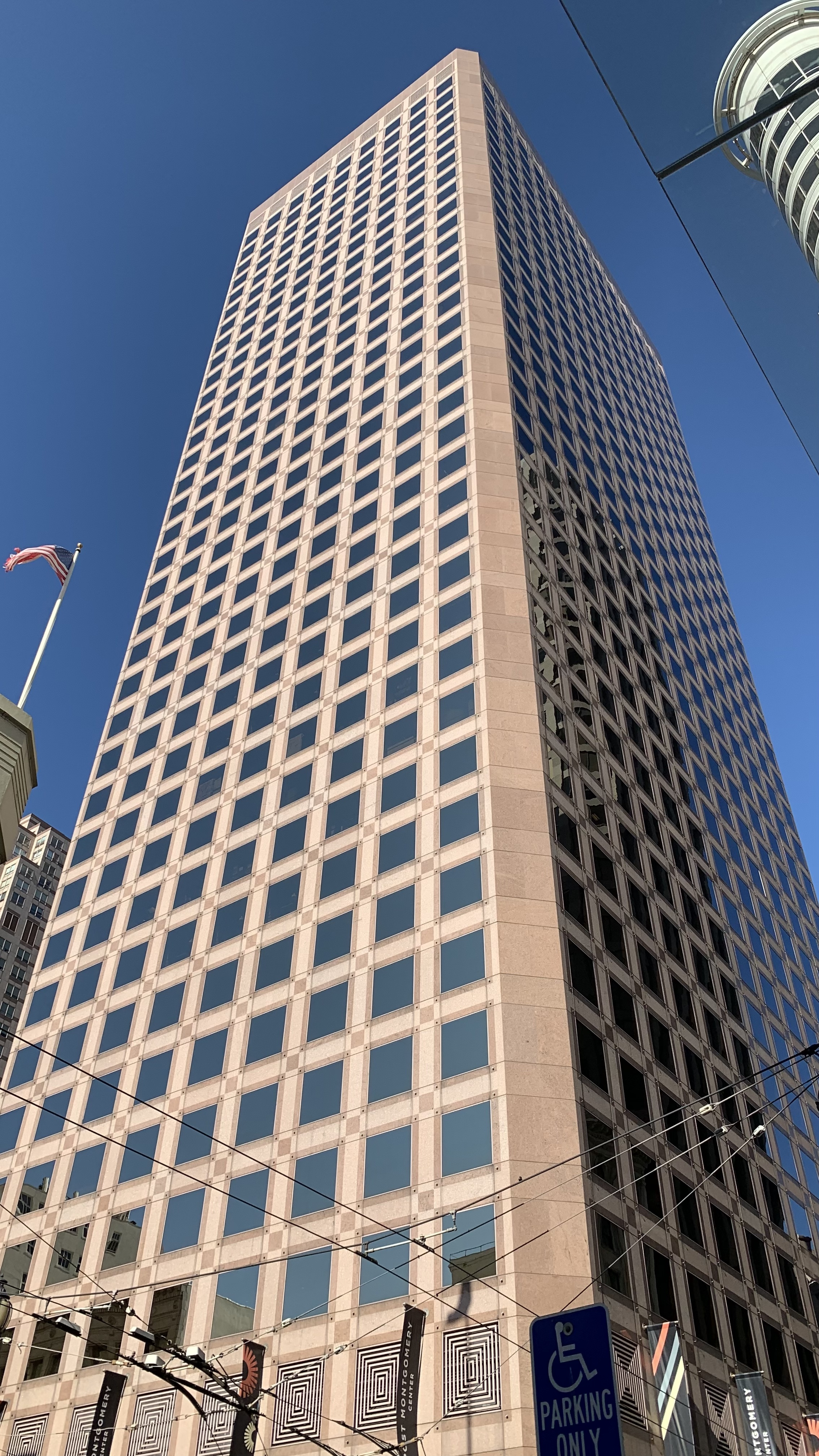
- In 2021

- Location within San Francisco
- Former names: Pacific Telesis Tower; Pacific Telesis Center
- Alternative names: Montgomery Tower; Post Montgomery Center; Montgomery Center

General information
- Type: Commercial offices
- Architectural style: Art Deco Revival
- Location: 120 Kearny Street; San Francisco, California
- Coordinates: 37.7891°N 122.4033°W
- Completed: 1982
- Operator: JLL

Height
- Roof: 500 ft (150 m)

Technical details
- Floor count: 38
- Floor area: 1,000,000 sq ft (93,000 m^{2})
- Lifts/elevators: 21

Design and construction
- Architect: Skidmore, Owings & Merrill

One Montgomery Tower (also known as Montgomery Tower and formerly Pacific Telesis Tower), part of the Post Montgomery Center complex, is an office skyscraper located at the northeast corner of Post and Kearny Streets in the financial district of San Francisco, California. The 500-foot (150-meter), 38-story tower was completed in 1982, and is connected to the Crocker Galleria mall. It houses around 2,500 office workers (as of 2019).

Despite the "One Montgomery" branding, the building's main entrance is on 120 Kearny Street, rather than on Montgomery Street. The building's structural steel columns are covered by a facade consisting of red granite and square tempered glass windows with aluminum frames, with small squares marking the intersections of each block of four windows (except for the first two floors, which use black granite and steel). The construction of the tower and Crocker Galleria in 1982 also involved the tearing down of the top ten floors of the adjacent Crocker Bank building on 1 Montgomery Street, with its new roof being converted into a privately-owned public open space (POPOS).

== Notable tenants ==
- One of the first cashierless Amazon Go stores opened on the ground floor of One Montgomery Tower in January 2019.
- A consulate general of the Netherlands
- The San Francisco office of the law firm Shook, Hardy, & Bacon
- Stitch Fix
- From 2017 to 2024, the Wikimedia Foundation was headquartered on the sixteenth floor.

== See also ==
- List of tallest buildings in San Francisco
