= Murder of Hannah Williams =

Schoolgirl murdered in London in 2001

Hannah Williams
- A photograph of Hannah Williams released to the public.
- Born: May 1986; London, England
- Disappeared: 21 April 2001 (aged 14); Dartford, Kent
- Body discovered: 15 March 2002; Northfleet, Kent

On 21 April 2001, Hannah Williams (born May 1986), a 14-year-old English schoolgirl, was murdered after going missing during a shopping trip in Dartford, Kent. Williams's body was discovered on 15 March 2002 at a cement works in an industrial area of Northfleet.

Robert Howard, a convicted sex offender suspected of other murders including in his native Ireland, was convicted in 2003 and sentenced to life in prison for her murder.

The disappearance and murder of Williams was controversial due to how poorly the investigation of the case was handled and the little coverage that her disappearance had, with allegations of missing white woman syndrome. Some authors compared Williams' case to that of Danielle Jones, a schoolgirl who disappeared in Essex, two months after Williams. It was suggested that Jones received more coverage than Williams because Jones was a middle-class girl with a functional home life, while Williams was from a lower-class background with estranged parents.

== Disappearance ==
On 21 April 2001, Hannah Williams told her mother that she was going window shopping in Dartford, but never returned home. For a long time it was presumed that Williams had run away, and the search was not helped by the fact that a friend reported seeing her long after she was believed to have died, either on or shortly after the date of her disappearance.

== Discovery of body and conviction of killer ==
Williams' body was discovered on 15 March 2002 at a cement works in an industrial area of Northfleet, Kent, beside the Thames estuary. Initially it was speculated that the body was that of Danielle Jones, who had been missing from East Tilbury in Essex since 18 June 2001, but Williams' clothing led to a correct identification. The discovery of Williams' body also overlapped with the investigation into the disappearance, and later murder, of Milly Dowler from Surrey, who vanished on 21 March 2002.

Robert Howard, a convicted sex offender who had known Williams since 1999, was arrested on 23 March 2002, eight days after her body was found. At his trial at Maidstone Crown Court in October 2003, Howard was found guilty of raping and murdering Williams, and was sentenced to life imprisonment. No minimum term was reported to have been recommended by the trial judge, and there have been no reports of a minimum term subsequently issued by the High Court.

== Robert Howard ==
Robert Lesarian Howard, of Wolfhill, a village in County Laois, Republic of Ireland, was born on 20 April 1944. Howard was first convicted of burglary at the age of 13, and at 19 was convicted of attempted rape of a 6-year-old girl in London. He served prison terms for attempted rape and strangulation in London and for burglary and rape in Cork, and was a police suspect in several disappearances of women and girls, including that of Jo Jo Dullard of Callan and Annie McCarrick, a New York tourist in County Wicklow. In 1993, the same year as McCarrick's disappearance, Howard was convicted of unlawful carnal knowledge of a girl under 17 in the case of a 16-year-old in Castlederg, County Tyrone, in Northern Ireland whom he had been accused of raping.

On 14 August 1994, while he was on bail, 15-year-old Arlene Arkinson, who was also from Castlederg, went missing in Bundoran, County Donegal. She was last seen in a car that Howard was driving. Arkinson is presumed dead, but her body has not been found. Howard was arrested six weeks after her disappearance and was tried in 2005 on charges of murdering her; he was acquitted by the jury, who had not been informed of his previous offences or his conviction for Williams's murder. (The jury in his trial for Williams's murder had heard evidence regarding his grooming both Arkinson and Williams after befriending family members.) An inquest into Arkison's death began in Belfast in February 2016 and included testimony that his earlier offences made him "extremely dangerous" to Arkinson by the time she disappeared. A second inquest in 2021 found him responsible for Arkinson's murder; the coroner also ruled that the police should have arrested him immediately given his known history. Howard died in prison on 2 October 2015 at the age of 71.

== Criticism of media ==
Hannah Williams's disappearance and murder investigation has been heavily scrutinized due to allegations of missing white woman syndrome. Williams lived with her single mother and came from a lower social class, her home was fairly dysfunctional and she had learning difficulties. The comparison in media coverage between her case's coverage and other missing girls' around the same age at the same time such as Leanne Tiernan, Holly Wells and Jessica Chapman, Milly Dowler and especially Danielle Jones has been noticed as these girls all came from middle class backgrounds with functional home lives and received significantly more media coverage.

== See also ==
- List of solved missing person cases (2000s)
- Missing white woman syndrome
- Murder of Danielle Jones
- Murder of Milly Dowler
- Murder of Leanne Tiernan
