= Stitch Fix =

Online personal styling service (company)

Stitch Fix, Inc.
- Type: Public
- Traded as: Nasdaq: SFIX (Class A); Russell 2000 component
- Industry: Retail
- Founded: February 2011; 15 years ago, in Cambridge, Massachusetts, U.S.
- Founders: Katrina Lake; Erin Morrison Flynn
- Headquarters: One Montgomery Tower, San Francisco, California, U.S.
- Key people: Katrina Lake (chairperson); Matt Baer (CEO); Sree Sreedhararaj (chief product and technology officer; CPTO)
- Services: Styling, clothing, footwear, accessories
- Revenue: ▲US$1.35 billion (2026)
- Operating income: ▲ −US$21.7 (2026)
- Net income: ▲ −US$12.6 million (2026)
- Total assets: ▼US$479.4 million (2026)
- Total equity: ▼US$196.1 million (2026)
- Owners: Katrina Lake (16.6%)
- Number of employees: 4,165 (2025)
- Website: stitchfix.com
- Footnotes; Financials as of September 23, 2026.

Stitch Fix, Inc. is an online personal styling service in the United States. The company combines human stylists with AI tools and data science to recommend clothing items and accessories based on fit, budget and style preferences. The company was founded in 2011 and had an initial public offering in 2017 with a valuation of $1.6 billion. For fiscal year 2025, Stitch Fix reported net revenue of $1.27 billion. As of November 2025, it had approximately 2.31 million active clients and employed about 4,165 people worldwide. It is headquartered in San Francisco, California.

== History ==
=== Founding and growth: 2011–2019 ===
Stitch Fix was founded in 2011 by Katrina Lake and former J.Crew buyer Erin Morrison Flynn. The business was originally called Rack Habit, and was initially run out of Lake's apartment in Cambridge, Massachusetts. The company began by catering only to women, but it has subsequently expanded to men's clothing, plus sizes, maternity wear, and kids.

In 2014, Stitch Fix started to be profitable. In July 2016, the company ended its fiscal year with recorded sales of $730 million, and in May 2017, the company had raised $42 million from outside investors.

In November 2017, the company went public on Nasdaq. It was the first female-led company to launch an IPO in over a year.

=== Leadership changes and restructuring: 2020–2023 ===
In August 2021, Elizabeth Spaulding replaced founder Katrina Lake as CEO. In January 2023, Spaulding stepped down as CEO, and Lake returned as interim CEO. Former Macy's executive Matt Baer was named CEO in June 2023.

In June 2022, Stitch Fix laid off approximately 15% of its salaried staff, which equated to around 330 employees, citing slowing growth in the e-commerce retail industry as the reason for the cuts.

In January 2023, Stitch Fix announced it would reduce its salaried workforce by about 20% and CEO Elizabeth Spaulding would step down. Founder Katrina Lake returned as interim CEO. The changes were part of a broader restructuring after a time of sliding sales.

In June 2023, Matt Baer was named Stitch Fix's new CEO. Katrina Lake continued in her role as executive chairperson of the board.

=== Recent developments: 2024–2026 ===
In the first quarter of fiscal year 2024, Stitch Fix ceased operations of its business in the United Kingdom. The company said it would focus solely on its core U.S. market.

In 2024, Stitch Fix outlined a multi-year transformation strategy structured around three phases: rationalize, build, and grow. The strategy was introduced as part of the company's efforts to stabilize the business, simplify operations, and return to sustainable growth. By fiscal year 2025, the company stated that it had entered the "grow" phase of this transition.

In August 2024, as part of its transformation, Stitch Fix began rolling out updates to its client experience. The changes focused on creating more ways for clients to engage, adding flexibility to how they shop, making Stylists more visible, and improving the overall assortment. As part of a broader rebrand, the company introduced Retail Therapy, a brand platform built around real shopping frustrations and therapy-inspired storytelling, across social media, television, over-the-top video, and YouTube.

As part of these changes, Stitch Fix introduced an AI tool called StyleFile, a personalized resource assigned to each Stitch Fix customer based on their preferences and shopping behavior, that defines their style, resulting in multi-faceted profiles that can include styles like "edgy" or "boho". Stitch Fix also introduced Stylist Profiles, which provides a profile for each stylist that features their "unique expertise and work portfolio, as well as related interests".

In August 2025, Stitch Fix announced its latest set of changes to its client experience, including several that leverage GenAI. These included Stylist connect, a feature that allows clients to communicate with a stylist outside of their scheduled Fix, AI Style Assistant, which was designed to help clients articulate their style preferences, and the launch of Stitch Fix Vision, a generative-AI style visualization tool.

On October 6, 2025, Stitch Fix launched Stitch Fix Vision. Clients who use Vision upload a selfie or full-length photo and receive AI-generated images of themselves wearing recommended outfits based on individual style profiles.

In December 2025, Stitch Fix reported net revenue of $342.1 million, a 7.3% year-over-year increase. It had around 2.31 million active clients, down 5.2% year-over-year, but net revenue per client rose 5.3% to $559. Gross profit was $149.3 million. In June 2025, Stitch Fix announced its return to YoY revenue growth and in December, the company began 2026 with no debt. It announced it expected to be free cash flow positive throughout 2026, and in June of that year reported its fifth consecutive quarter of year-over-year revenue growth, sequential growth in active clients and its third consecutive quarter of year-over-year growth in new clients.

In June 2026, Stitch Fix appointed former IPSY CTO, Sree Sreedhararaj, as the chief product and technology officer. In the same year, Stitch Fix expanded Vision with ‘See It On Me,’ allowing clients to generate personalized images of themselves wearing recommended outfits on demand.

== Business model ==
Stitch Fix is a personal styling service that sends client individually picked clothing and accessories. Customer can order a "Fix" of up to 8 items per box, either as needed or on a recurring basis, with no monthly fee or required subscription, and a $20 styling fee in addition to the cost of any kept items. Any unwanted items could be returned. The company combines the knowledge of human stylists with AI to personalize clothing selections.

Customers fill out a survey online about their style, fit, and budget preferences. Stylists pick items based on a customer's survey answers and ongoing feedback the client shares with them. A stylist at the company then picks up to eight items to send to the customer. The customer schedules a date to receive their items, which is referred to as a "Fix". Once the shipment is received, the customer has three days to choose to keep the items or return some or all of them. If the customer keeps at least one item, the initial styling fee is credited towards the cost of the item. In addition to the styling fee being credited, if the customer decides to keep five or more items, the customer receives 20% off the total cost of the items. Customers choose the shipping frequency, such as every two weeks, once a month, or every two months.

Stitch Fix Freestyle, launched in 2021, is a feature that allows users to browse and purchase individual apparel items directly through the platform without requesting a scheduled Fix. The feature presents product selections based on information from a user's style profile and includes various browsing categories, offering an alternative to the company's curated shipment model.

As of 2025, Stitch Fix introduced features that allow clients to request a Fix built around a specific item discovered through its Freestyle platform, enabling a curated shipment centered on a selected product. The company also offers "Themed Fixes", which are Fixes curated for a specific occasion, trend, or use case and tailored based on individual client preferences. The company also offers Family Accounts.

The company uses data science and has combined personal stylists and machine learning (AI) for personalized recommendation.

== Media ==
Stitch Fix has been covered in technology and business publications, including Wired, Fast Company, and The Wall Street Journal. Media excerpts include Wired highlighting Stitch Fix's "Shop Your Looks" feature, Fast Company discussing its "data prowess across every aspect of its business to reinvent the $334 billion U.S. apparel industry", and CNBC and Wall Street Journal highlighting the company's growth plan.

In October 2025, Sherwood news in an interview with CEO, Matt Baer, covered the businesses three-phase rebuilding plan: rationalize, build, and grow. In addition, Women's Wear Daily described Stitch Fix under CEO Matt Baer as focusing on growth and transformation.

Stitch Fix was recognized as one of the "50 Most Innovative Companies" in 2019. The company hosted a Golden Globes–like red carpet event in the 59th Street–Columbus Circle station in New York City and had a 60-second spot before the 2019 Academy Awards.

In October 2025, the company was included on Forbes' 2026 Best Customer Service list and USA Today's 2025 10 Best Clothing Subscription Box list.

In November 2025, Stitch Fix was recognized for the most personalized shopping experience in the 2025 Glossy Fashion and Luxury Awards.

== Controversy ==
In October 2018, several class action lawsuits were brought against Stitch Fix alleging that the company had violated federal securities laws by making misleading statements about its growth prospects.

On June 2, 2020, the company announced layoffs for 1,400 employees, which was 18% of its total workforce, all of whom were remote workers in California. The affected employees were given the option of remaining with the company if they relocated. The online retailer also announced it would hire roughly 2,000 stylists in cities that have a lower cost of living than those in California, such as Austin, Cleveland, Dallas, Minneapolis, and Pittsburgh.

== See also ==
- Subscription box
