= Disappearance of Kristen Modafferi =

Unsolved 1997 disappearance of 18-year-old American woman

Kristen Modafferi
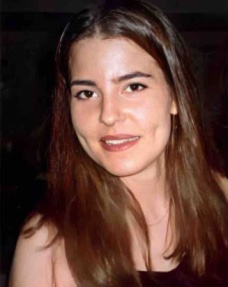
- Born: Kristen Deborah Modafferi; June 1, 1979; Danbury, Connecticut, U.S.
- Disappeared: June 23, 1997 (aged 18); San Francisco, California, U.S.
- Status: Missing for 29 years, 3 months and 21 days
- Education: North Carolina State University
- Known for: Missing person
- Height: 5 ft 6 in (1.68 m)

Kristen Deborah Modafferi (born June 1, 1979; disappeared June 23, 1997) is an American woman who, at the age of 18 in the early summer of 1997, disappeared under mysterious circumstances after leaving her job at the Crocker Galleria in San Francisco, California. The college sophomore at North Carolina State University was spending the summer in the Bay Area; Modafferi had recently relocated from her native North Carolina to Oakland and was expected to start summer classes in photography at the University of California, Berkeley on the day after she vanished.

In 2000, "Kristen's Law" was signed by President Bill Clinton to provide assistance to police departments and families of missing persons over the age of 17. The law authorized the annual sequestering of $1 million for the support of missing persons organizations, including the National Center for Missing Adults. Federal funding for Kristen's Law ran out in 2005 after the law's expiration. As of 2025, the Modafferi case remained unsolved.

== Background ==
Kristen Deborah Modafferi was born June 1, 1979, in Danbury, Connecticut, to Debbie, a teacher, and Bob Modafferi, an electrical engineer. She was raised in Charlotte, North Carolina. In 1997, having just completed her freshman year at North Carolina State University on a Park Scholarship, she traveled alone to the San Francisco Bay Area for the summer to study photography at the University of California, Berkeley. She used Craigslist to find a room in a house on Jayne Avenue in Oakland, where she had four male roommates. She found part-time employment at the San Francisco Museum of Modern Art and a full-time job at Spinelli's coffee shop in the Crocker Galleria Mall in San Francisco's Financial District.

== Disappearance ==
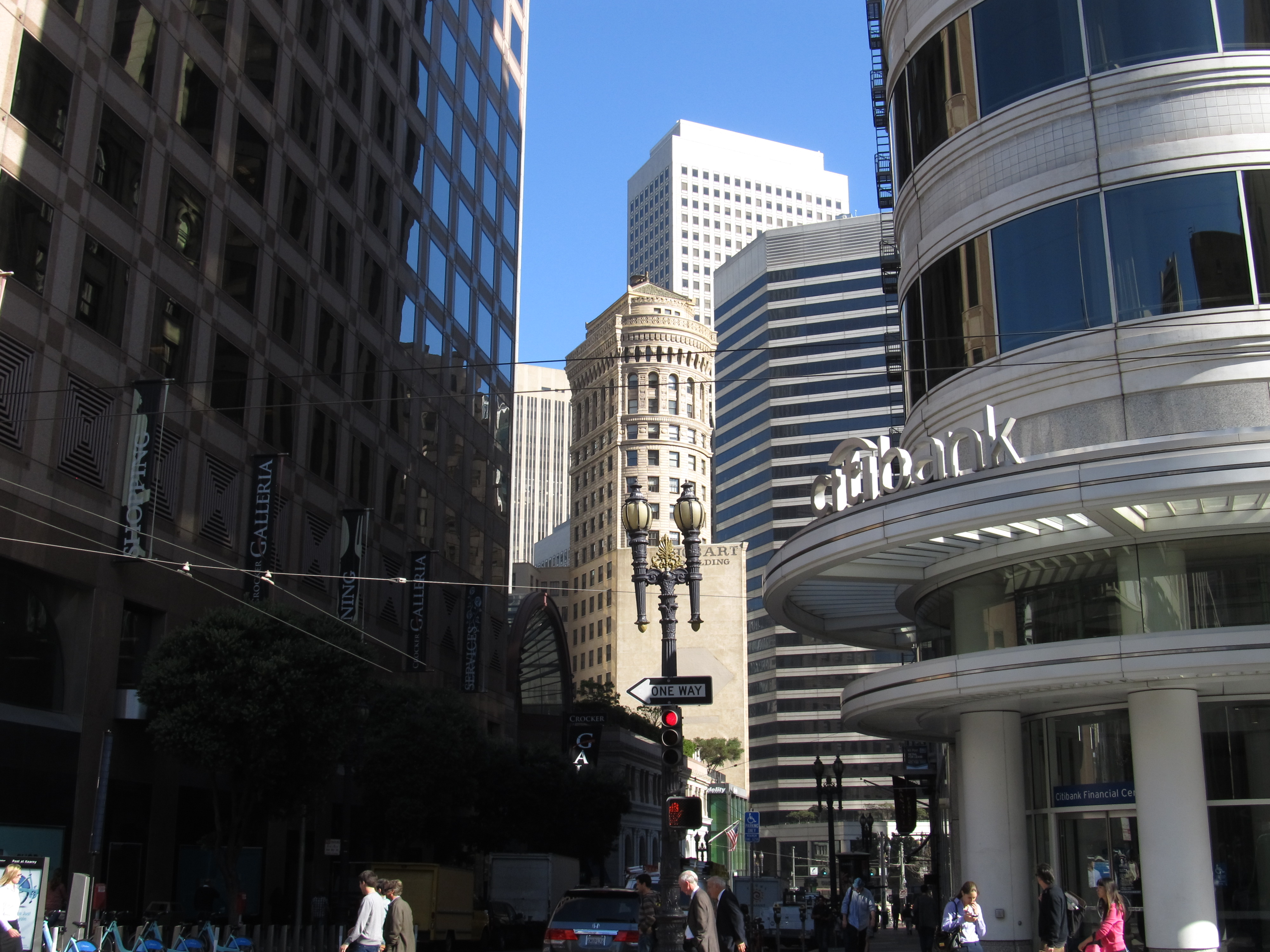
Modafferi was last seen at the Crocker Galleria mall (left) in San Francisco's Financial District

On the afternoon of June 23, 1997, three weeks after her eighteenth birthday, Modafferi concluded her shift at Spinelli's at around 3:00 p.m. She had indicated to coworkers that she considered visiting Baker Beach that afternoon to potentially attend a party. At around 45 minutes after her shift had ended, coworkers from Spinelli's saw Modafferi with an unidentified blonde woman on the second floor of the Galleria. The woman has never been identified, and she has yet to step forward. Video surveillance last caught Modafferi withdrawing cash from a Wells Fargo ATM.

=== Search efforts ===
Modafferi failed to attend the first day of her photography class at UC Berkeley on June 24, a course for which she had already paid $925 in tuition. Additionally, she left a $400 paycheck at Spinelli's unclaimed. Her roommates noted that Modafferi did not return home on the night of June 23, but they did not report her as missing. Several days later, after Modafferi's father left a message on the house phone's answering machine, one of her roommates returned his call and informed him nobody at the house had seen her for three days.

"We have no victim, we have no witness. We don't have anything. She left us nothing to go on. I've looked at her bank records, Social Security number […] There's nothing to indicate that she's alive or dead."

— Investigator Tim Hames on the nature of Modafferi's disappearance

Modafferi's parents then flew to San Francisco on Friday, June 27, and reported their daughter missing to the Oakland Police Department. However, law enforcement initially considered Modafferi a runaway, and did not begin investigating her disappearance until Monday, June 30. A $50,000 reward was set for any information leading to Modafferi's return, and a private investigator was hired by the Modafferi family. Police bloodhounds traced Modafferi's scent to the Muni 38 Geary bus from a bus stop outside the Galleria. Her trail was also noted by the bloodhounds near the end of the bus route at Sutro Heights Park, but her scent was lost near there.

The Modafferis found a Bay Guardian newspaper stuffed in a trash can in Kristen's room with a personal ad circled, which read: "FRIENDS: Female seeking friends to share activities, who enjoy music, photography, working out, walks, coffee, or simply the beach, exploring the Bay area! Interested, call me." Law enforcement was unable to locate the individual who had placed the ad, as the newspaper had purged their backlog for that week, and there is no indication that Modafferi responded to the ad.

=== Jon Onuma ===
On July 10, 1997, a man phoned KGO-TV claiming that Modafferi was murdered by two lesbians after an affair and her body disposed of under a wooden bridge near Point Reyes. The caller was identified as thirty-six year old Jon Onuma, who lived near the Galleria. Onuma told police he had falsely implicated the women, as he felt they were conspiring to get his girlfriend, Jill Lampo, fired from her job at the local YMCA where they also worked. Onuma denied having ever met Modafferi. Searches of Onuma's apartment revealed "sizable" amounts of blood, though it was later determined by DNA testing to be that of a cat. It was discovered that Onuma had previously placed personal advertisements for women in the Bay Area and coerced them into sex. Onuma relocated to his native Hawaii in 1999.

== Later developments ==
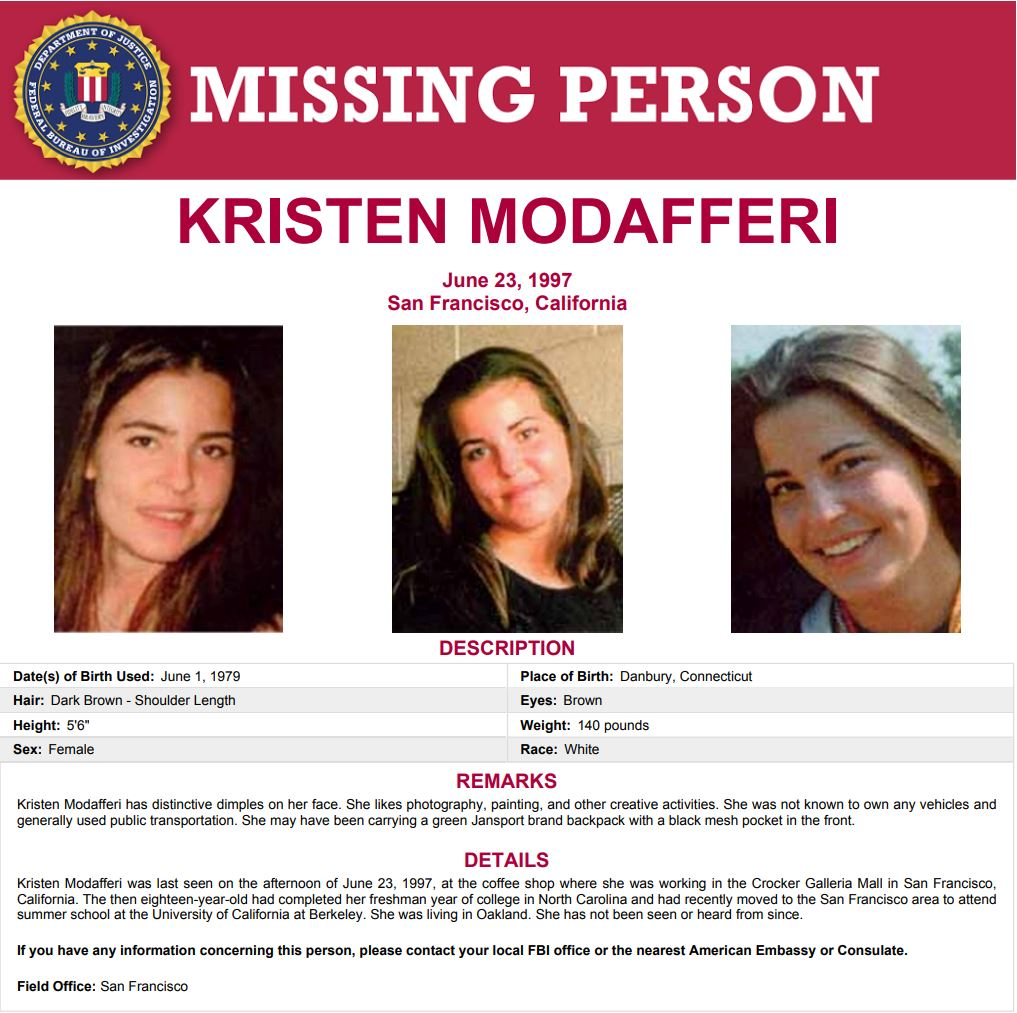
Kristen Modafferi's FBI missing poster

In 2015, an independent search of the house Modafferi had been living in when she disappeared was completed; during the search, a cadaver dog with a "world-class" reputation detected the presence of human remains in the basement. Paul Dostie, a former Mammoth Lakes police sergeant and owner of the dog, suggested that Oakland police excavate a concrete slab in the basement, and proposed that Modafferi's roommates at the time be re-interviewed by law enforcement. Dr. Arpad Vass, a forensic anthropologist from the University of Tennessee, visited the house in February 2017 and scanned the area with a proprietary device he developed which detects human decomposition chemicals. The device pinpointed between 274 Jayne Avenue and the house next door, 278 Jayne Avenue. Dostie stated that the results of these searches likely indicated a crime scene rather than a burial; aside from the concrete slab, the home's basement floor consists of hard-packed clay which would be difficult to dig with a standard shovel. Additionally, a chemical signature denoting the presence of human blood was discovered near a concrete slab at the base of porch steps at the 278 Jayne Avenue residence; according to Dostie and Vass, DNA testing revealed that the decomposing material matched that of Bob and Debbie Modafferi, who had provided samples for testing.

In response to the findings of Dostie and Vass, the Oakland Police's public information officer Felicia Aisthorpe stated that their findings needed to be confirmed by the city police, and claimed the information had yet to be delivered to the police department: "At this time, the information we need from Dr. Vass to collect samples for his 'human decomposition' testing has not been forwarded to the department. Additionally, no information regarding the more recent blood testing conducted on the porch has been disclosed to the department." Dostie and Vass denied this to be the case, stating that the Oakland Police Department had enough data to undertake their own tests. Vass stated: "All OPD needs to do is bring their own dogs out to that site and see what happens," Vass wrote in an email. "I am quite sure that Paul also told OPD how to look for human specific VOCs (volatile organic compounds) in collected soil samples. All you need is a GC-MS (gas chromatograph coupled with a mass spectrometer) which every university or crime lab in the world have. The procedure is very straight-forward."

== Kristen's Law ==
Kristen's Law was introduced by Representative Sue Myrick in 1999 and signed into law by Bill Clinton in 2000. Due to the fact that Modafferi was eighteen at the time of her disappearance, the lack of resources available for searching for her were noted, and as such, since taking effect in 2001, Kristen's Law "provided assistance to law enforcement and families in missing persons cases of those over the age of 17" and authorized $1 million per year to support organizations including the National Center for Missing Adults. The center's federal funding ran out in 2005 when Kristen's Law expired. It has continued with volunteer efforts.

== In media ==
Modafferi's case remains unsolved, and has been profiled on Unsolved Mysteries, Primetime Live and America's Most Wanted.

== See also ==
- List of people who disappeared mysteriously (2000–present)

== Sources ==
- Birkbeck, Matt (December 2003). "Without a Trace" (PDF). Reader's Digest. New York City: Trusted Media Brands, Inc. pp. 84–94. ISSN 0034-0375. Archived from the original (PDF) on 2006-11-09.
- Newton, Michael (2009). The Encyclopedia of Unsolved Crimes. New York City: Infobase Publishing. ISBN 978-1-438-11914-4.
