= Killing of Zohra Shah =

2020 beating death in Punjab, Pakistan

Zohra Shah
- زہرہ شاہ
- Born: Muzaffargarh District
- Died: 1 June 2020 (aged 8); Rawalpindi, Punjab, Pakistan
- Cause of death: Beating

Zohra Shah (Urdu: زہرہ شاہ) was an eight-year-old Pakistani domestic slave of a married couple, Hassan Siddiqui and Umme Kulsoom. She was tortured and killed for mistakenly releasing her masters' parrots in Bahria Town, Rawalpindi on 1 June 2020. Her death caused an outcry in Pakistan and led to legislative changes which outlawed child domestic labour in the country.

== Early life ==
Shah was from Basti Maso Shah in Muzaffargarh District of southern Punjab approximately 580 kilometres (360 mi) from the capital, Islamabad.

== Murder ==
Allegedly, Shah was murdered for releasing valuable parrots from their cages. Evidence such as 'older scars and marks' suggest Shah had been repeatedly abused while working for Siddiqui and Kulsoom, and 'wounds on her thighs' were 'consistent with sexual assault'.

== Aftermath ==
Siddiqui and Kulsoom were arrested and put on judicial remand. In the Pakistani legal system, the victim's family is required to officially press charges and have the legal authority to forgive the murder. The accused's relatives pressured Shah's parents to accept a blood-money settlement in exchange for forgiving her murderers, and when they refused, threatened to use it to bribe the police and halt the investigation instead.

Several actors and social media personalities spoke out against the murder and called for better implementation of child labor laws, starting a #JusticeForZohraShah tag on Twitter.

Two months later on July 30, 2020, in what seemed like a response to the case, the government announced a federal ban on child domestic labor by proscribing it under the Child Employment Act 1991.

== See also ==
- Murder of Danielle Jones
- Murder of Tia Rigg
