= Murder of Dru Sjodin =

2003 kidnapping-murder case in United States

- Dru Sjodin
- Location: Grand Forks, North Dakota, U.S. Crookston, Minnesota, U.S.
- Date: November 22, 2003
- Attack type: Murder, sexual assault, beating, stabbing, kidnapping
- Victim: Dru Sjodin
- Perpetrator: Alfonso Rodriguez Jr.
- Motive: Sexual
- Verdict: Guilty
- Convictions: Kidnapping resulting in death
- Sentence: Death; commuted to life imprisonment

The murder of Dru Sjodin, a 22-year-old student at the University of North Dakota and Gamma Phi Beta sorority member, occurred on November 22, 2003. Sjodin was kidnapped by Alfonso Rodriguez Jr. from the Columbia Mall parking lot in Grand Forks, North Dakota. Rodriguez Jr. took Sjodin to the North Dakota and Minnesota state lines, where he murdered her and left her body in Crookston, Minnesota.

In August 2006, Rodriguez Jr. was found guilty of kidnapping resulting in death of Dru Sjodin in a federal court. Rodriguez Jr. was sentenced to death, however, his death sentence was appealed and he was sentenced to life in prison without the possibility of parole.

Her disappearance and murder attracted national attention, and generated extensive media coverage. Sjodin's murder prompted the creation of the Dru Sjodin National Sex Offender Public Registry, an unprecedented public safety resource that provides the public with access to sex offender data nationwide.

== Murder ==
At 4:00 p.m. on Saturday, November 22, 2003, Dru Katrina Sjodin (born September 26, 1981) finished her shift at the Victoria's Secret store located in the Columbia Mall in Grand Forks, North Dakota. After shopping for and purchasing a new purse from Marshall Field's, Sjodin left the mall and began walking to her 1994 Oldsmobile Cutlass. In the parking lot she spoke via cell phone with her boyfriend Chris Lang. Four minutes into their conversation, Lang reports Sjodin was saying "Okay, okay," before the call abruptly ended. Lang suspected the call was interrupted by technical problems, and because the conversation had been routine with no urgency from Sjodin he believed nothing suspicious occurred. About three hours later, Lang received another call from her cell phone, but heard only static and the sound of buttons being pressed. Some sources report this second call originated near Fisher, Minnesota, but that claim has remained unsubstantiated. With this second call and Sjodin not appearing for her other job (at the El Roco nightclub) there was concern for her safety.

A week later, on December 1, suspect Alfonso Rodriguez Jr. (born February 18, 1953), was arrested in connection with Sjodin's disappearance. He was 50 years old and classed as a high-risk sexual offender after his release for an earlier conviction.

== Victim ==
Dru Katrina Sjodin was born September 26, 1981 in Minneapolis, Minnesota. Dru graduated from Pequot Lakes High School in Minnesota in spring 2000 and was voted homecoming queen her senior year. Sjodin interned through the University of North Dakota’s aviation program and worked with underprivileged teens through her Gamma Phi Beta sorority.

== Perpetrator ==
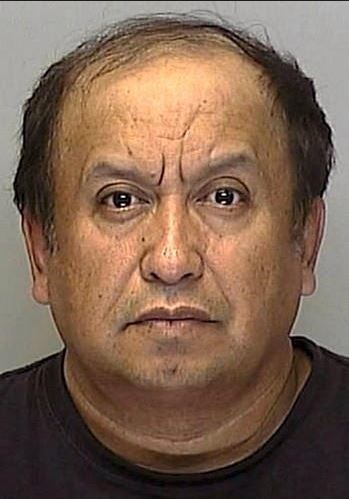
Rodriguez, in 2000

Alfonso Rodriguez Jr. was the son of migrant farm workers Dolores and Alfonso Rodriguez Sr., who traveled between Crystal City, Texas, and Minnesota and then decided to settle in 1963 in Crookston, Minnesota. He admitted to using many drugs during his youth and committed his first sexual assault with a knife when he was 21 by attempting to rape a woman he asked to give him a ride home.

Rodriguez had been released from prison May 1, 2003, after serving a 23-year prison term for rape, aggravated assault and kidnapping a woman. Rodriguez had also previously pleaded guilty to rape and was convicted multiple times for rape. He had a long criminal record that included repeated sexual assaults against women. He was released as a Minnesota Level 3 sex offender which meant he was highly likely to reoffend.

=== Police investigation ===
Police reports indicate that Rodriguez claimed to have been near Columbia Mall on the evening of Sjodin's disappearance, reportedly watching Once Upon a Time in Mexico at the Columbia Mall Cinema 4. This claim was disproven as the film was not screening at that cinema or any other local theater at the time. Further investigations revealed receipts from Rodriguez's purchases at various stores around the mall, including one from a nearby Menards store for a knife. Notably, Rodriguez possessed two specific tool kit knives available only at a certain home center store located approximately a mile from the mall. These knives, however, were not purchased on the day Sjodin vanished, and their exact purchase date remains unknown. In Rodriguez's car, police found one of these tool kit knives submerged in a cleaning solution in the rear wheel well. Additionally, a woman's shoe and another knife with blood matching Sjodin's DNA were discovered in the vehicle.

Sjodin's body was recovered on April 17, 2004, just west of Crookston, Minnesota, when deep snow drifts began to melt. Crookston is also where Rodriguez lived with his mother. Sjodin's body was found partially nude and face down in a ravine. Her hands were tied behind her back; she had been beaten, stabbed, and sexually assaulted, and had several lacerations including a five-and-a-half inch cut on her neck. A rope was also tied around her neck and remnants of a shopping bag were found under the rope, suggesting that a bag had been placed on her head. The medical examiner concluded that she had either died as a result of the major neck wound, from suffocation, or from exposure to the elements. Thousands of people had helped search for Sjodin, and hundreds attended her funeral.

=== Trial and sentencing ===
Because Sjodin had been taken across state lines, the crime became a federal case under the Federal Kidnapping Act. This meant that Rodriguez was eligible to receive the death penalty if convicted, a possibility not allowed under North Dakota or Minnesota law, as neither state has the death penalty. It was the first death penalty case in a century to take place in North Dakota. U.S. Attorney Drew Wrigley and Assistant U.S. Attorneys Keith Reisenauer and Norman Anderson prosecuted the case against Rodriguez. On August 30, 2006, Rodriguez was convicted in federal court of kidnapping resulting in death for the murder of Dru Sjodin, and on September 22, 2006, the jury recommended that he receive the death penalty. On February 8, 2007, Rodriguez was formally sentenced to death by U.S District Judge Ralph R. Erickson. He is imprisoned at the United States Penitentiary, Coleman in Florida. Judge Erickson arranged that Rodriguez would be executed in South Dakota.

In October 2011, defense attorneys filed a federal habeas corpus motion claiming that Rodriguez was mentally disabled. On June 28, 2013, Rodriguez admitted his guilt in a death row interview with Dr. Michael Welner.

=== Appeals ===
In 2021, the same judge who sentenced Rodriguez to death, Ralph R. Erickson, now a judge for the United States Court of Appeals for the Eighth Circuit, overturned his sentence and ordered that a new sentencing phase be conducted due to "misleading testimony from a medical examiner and limitations on mental health evidence". The testimony in court of Michael McGee, the Ramsey County Medical Examiner, was "unreliable, misleading and inaccurate" and that Rodriguez's attorneys did him a disservice by opting to limit the mental health evaluation of Rodriguez which could have resulted in the possible use of the insanity defense by their client.

On March 14, 2023, prosecutors announced that they would no longer seek the death penalty for Rodriguez. Rodriguez was sentenced to life without parole on May 18, 2023.

== Legacy ==
Legislation dubbed "Dru's Law", which set up the Dru Sjodin National Sex Offender Public Registry, was passed in 2006 and signed into law by President George W. Bush. The Dru Sjodin National Sex Offender Public Website (NSOPW) is an unprecedented public safety resource that provides the public with access to sex offender data nationwide. NSOPW is a partnership between the U.S. Department of Justice and state, territorial and tribal governments, working together for the safety of adults and children.

In 2004, a scholarship in Sjodin's name was set up at the University of North Dakota.

A memorial garden for Sjodin opened in her hometown of Pequot Lakes, Minnesota, and another is planned for the UND campus.

== See also ==
- List of death row inmates in the United States
- List of solved missing person cases (2000s)
- Sex offender registries in the United States
