= Murder of Tia Rigg =

Murder of an English girl

Tia Rigg
- Born: Tia Simone Rigg; 4 January 1998
- Died: 3 April 2010 (aged 12); Cheetham Hill, Manchester, England, United Kingdom
- Cause of death: Strangulation
- Body discovered: Dalmain Close, Cheetham Hill, Manchester, England
- Resting place: Southern Cemetery, Chorlton-cum-Hardy, Greater Manchester, England
- Known for: Murder victim
- Parent(s): Lynne Rigg; Lee Rigg

Tia Rigg (4 January 1998 – 3 April 2010) was a girl who was killed in Cheetham Hill, Manchester, England on 3 April 2010. Twelve-year-old Rigg was tortured, raped and murdered by her maternal uncle, John Maden.

On 4 October 2010, 38-year-old Maden, who had pleaded guilty to the crime, was sentenced to life imprisonment with a whole life order, meaning that he will likely remain in prison until he dies.

Sentencing, Mr Justice Keith said: "This is one of those exceptional cases in which the only just punishment requires you to be imprisoned for the rest of your life."

== Murder ==
John Maden
- Born: John Nigel Maden; 1971 or 1972 (age 54–55)
- Status: Incarcerated
- Convictions: Murder; rape
- Penalty: Life imprisonment with a whole life order

Details
- Date apprehended: 3 April 2010

At 2:17pm on 3 April 2010, Maden, who had an "obsessive interest" in pornography relating to pedophilia, rape, and torture, telephoned his sister Lynne (Rigg's mother) and asked for Tia to go to his home in Dalmain Close, Cheetham Hill, in order to babysit his 10-year-old daughter. When she arrived at 3:00pm, he drugged her with Olanzapine, an antipsychotic tranquilizer that he had been prescribed.

He then inflicted a "horrific catalogue of sexual injuries" on her before stabbing her and strangling her with a ligature made from a guitar string. At 3:45pm, Maden telephoned the 999 emergency services number and said: "Hi, I would like to report a murder." He then gave his name and address and when asked by the operator what had happened he replied: "My niece has been murdered by me ... I have just finished killing her now." When he was asked why he had killed her, he answered: "Because I felt like it" and terminated the call.

Police officers from Greater Manchester Police arrived at the address two minutes later. Maden opened the door to the officers, who described him as "chillingly calm", and directed them upstairs. They found Rigg's body face-up on the floor of a spare bedroom.

A post-mortem found that Rigg had suffered severe blood loss from her stab wounds and internal injuries, but the primary cause of death was ligature strangulation.

== Aftermath ==
Maden was tried at Manchester Crown Court on 4 October 2010. Prosecutor Gordon Cole QC told the court: "In the year or so prior to April this year, the defendant had developed what can properly be described as an obsessive interest in images and literature relating to paedophilia, rape and torture. He had an extensive library of such materials which included literature dealing with methods of killing."

Police had found "hundreds of extreme images of child abuse and violent pornography" on Maden's laptop, plus more material on his mobile phone in folders named "snuff", "snuff stories" and "brutal rape". Detective Chief Inspector David Warren, who led the investigation, revealed that Maden refused to explain his actions and had never shown remorse for the killing.

After pleading guilty to rape and murder, Maden was sentenced to life imprisonment with a recommendation that he should never be released. Passing sentence, Mr Justice Keith told him: "It is inescapable that Tia Rigg died because you decided to realise your fantasies about torturing and killing a young child. It is difficult to know how long Tia's ordeal lasted. The terror, the unimaginable pain you inflicted on her, the indignities you subjected her to while still alive. It was planned, it was premeditated and her agony must have been prolonged. This is one of those exceptional cases in which the only just punishment requires you to be imprisoned for the rest of your life."

== See also ==
- Murder of Danielle Jones, a 15-year-old girl murdered by her uncle 9 years prior.
- Murder of Tia Sharp, another 12-year-old girl murdered by her grandmother's boyfriend only 2 years later.
