= Crocker Galleria =

Shopping mall in San Francisco, California

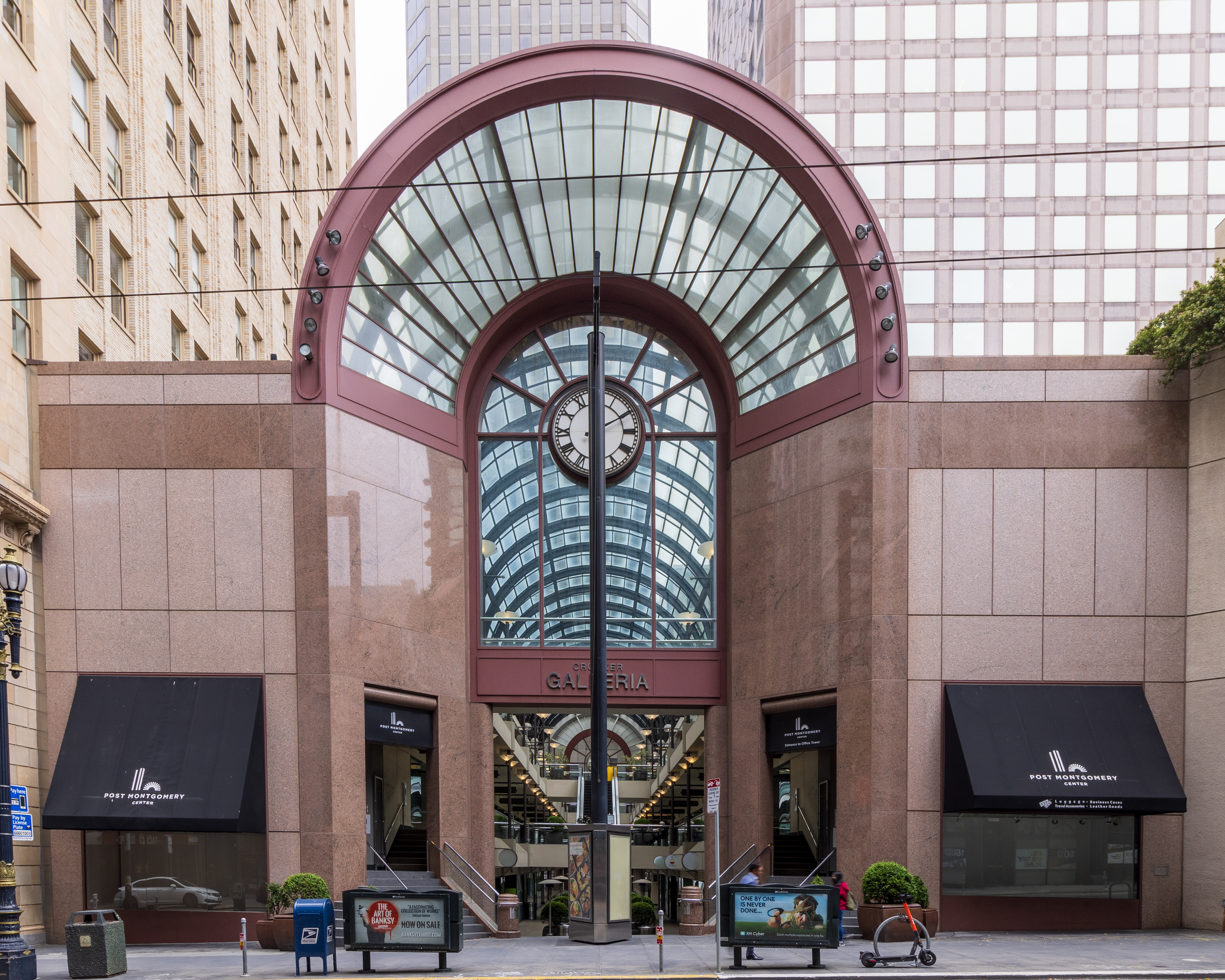
- Entrance to Crocker Galleria
- Location: 50 Post Street, San Francisco, California, U.S.
- Coordinates: 37°47′27″N 122°24′06″W
- Opened: 1982
- Developer: Skidmore, Owings & Merrill
- Num. of stores: 3 (as of 2024)
- Parking: Yes

Crocker Galleria is a three-level shopping center located at 50 Post Street in San Francisco's Financial District.

== History ==
Crocker Galleria was opened in 1982, designed by Edward Charles Bassett of Skidmore, Owings & Merrill. Originally, it housed around 62 stores and restaurants, providing an urban amenity for pedestrians in a densely packed urban core.

Known for its glass atrium inspired by Galleria Vittorio Emanuele II in Milan, it offers a semi-indoor shopping experience.

== Incidents ==
Crocker Galleria is also notable for the mysterious disappearance of Kristen Modafferi in 1997. Modafferi, an 18-year-old college student, vanished after leaving her job at the Galleria. Despite extensive investigations, her case remains unsolved.
