= United States National Sex Offenders Public Registry =

Sex offender registry search tool coordinated by the United States Department of Justice

The Dru Sjodin National Sex Offender Public Registry is a cooperative effort between U.S. state agencies that host public sex offender registries and the U.S. federal government. The registry is coordinated by the United States Department of Justice and operates a web site search tool allowing a user to submit a single query to obtain information about sex offenders throughout the United States.

== Purpose ==
State sex-offender registration and notification programs are designed, in general, to include information about offenders who have been convicted of a "criminal offense against a victim who is a minor" or a "sexually violent offense," as specified in the Jacob Wetterling Crimes Against Children and Sexually Violent Offender Registration Act ("the Wetterling Act") – more specifically, information about persons convicted of offenses involving sexual molestation or sexual exploitation of children, and persons convicted of rape and rape-like offenses (regardless of the age of the victim), respectively. Not all state web sites provide for public disclosure of information about all sex-offenders who reside, work, or attend school in the state. For example, one state may limit public disclosure over its web site of information concerning offenders who have been determined to be high-risk, while another state may provide for wider disclosure of offender information but make no representation as to risk level of specific offenders. Members of the public may be able to obtain certain types of information about specific offenders who reside, work, or attend school in the state and have been convicted of one or more of the types of offenses specified below, depending on the specific parameters of a given State's public notification program.

== Search capabilities ==
The National Sex Offender Public Registry website supports search by:

- Name
- ZIP Code
- County (if provided by state)
- City/Town (if provided by state)
- State (one or multiple)
- National

The results are limited to what each individual state may provide. Information is hosted by each state, not by the federal government.

== Constitutionality ==
=== U.S. Supreme Court rulings ===
In two cases docketed for argument on November 13, 2003, the sex offender registries of two states, Alaska and Connecticut, would face legal challenge. This was the first instance that the Supreme Court had to examine the implementation of sex offender registries throughout the U.S. The ruling would let the states know how far they could go in informing citizens of perpetrators of sex crimes. The constitutionality of the registries was challenged in two ways:

==== Ex post facto challenge ====
In Smith v. Doe, 538 U.S. 84 (2003), the Supreme Court upheld Alaska's sex-offender registration statute. Reasoning that sex offender registration deals with civil laws, not punishment, the Court ruled 6-3 that it is not an unconstitutional ex post facto law. Justices John Paul Stevens, Ruth Bader Ginsburg, and Stephen Breyer dissented.

However, On July 25, 2008, Doe number two prevailed and the Alaska Supreme Court ruled that the Alaska Sex Offender Registration Act's registration violated the ex post facto clause of the state's constitution and ruled that the requirement does not apply to persons who committed their crimes before the act became effective on August 10, 1994.

==== Due process challenge ====
In Connecticut Dept. of Public Safety v. Doe, 538 U.S. 1 (2003), the Court ruled that Connecticut's sex-offender registration statute did not violate the procedural due process of those to whom it applied, although the Court "expresses no opinion as to whether the State's law violates substantive due process principles."

Update: Reynolds V. United States Certiorari to the United States Court of Appeals for the Third Circuit No. 10–6549. Argued October 3, 2011—Decided January 23, 2012 "The Act does not require pre-Act offenders to register before the Attorney General validly specifies that the Act's registration provisions apply to them."

=== State Court rulings ===
==== Hawaii ====
In State v. Bani, 36 P.3d 1255 (Haw. 2001), the Hawaii State Supreme Court held that Hawaii's sex offender registration statute violated the due process clause of the Constitution of Hawaii, ruling that it deprived potential registrants "of a protected liberty interest without due process of law." The Court reasoned that the sex offender law authorized "public notification of (the potential registrant's) status as a convicted sex offender without notice, an opportunity to be heard, or any preliminary determination of whether and to what extent (he) actually represents a danger to society."

==== Alaska ====
After losing the constitutional challenge in the US Supreme Court in 2002 one of the two Doe's in the case committed suicide. The other Doe began a new challenge in the state courts. Per the ALASKA DEPARTMENT OF PUBLIC SAFETY website: On July 25, 2008, Doe number two prevailed and the Alaska Supreme Court ruled that the Alaska Sex Offender Registration Act's registration violated the ex post facto clause of the state's constitution and ruled that the requirement does not apply to persons who committed their crimes before the act became effective on August 10, 1994.

==== Maryland ====
In March 2013 Maryland Court of Appeals (Highest court of Maryland) decision Doe v. DPSCS declared that Maryland's existing registry laws are punitive in effect, and therefore could not constitutionally be applied retroactively to persons whose crimes pre-dated registration. RSOL's Maryland chapter, FAIR (Families Advocating Intelligent Registries) was part of the Amicus Curiae, testifying for the de facto punitive effects of Maryland sex offender law cited in the decision. This decision was further solidified in 2014 with the "Doe 2" decision. The full impact of these decisions in Maryland is still being effected.

==== Missouri ====
Many successful challenges to sex offender registration laws in the United States have been in Missouri because of a unique provision in the Missouri Constitution (Article I, Section 13) prohibiting laws "retrospective in [their] operation."

In Doe v. Phillips, 194 S.W.3d 837 (Mo. banc 2006), the Supreme Court of Missouri held that the Missouri Constitution did not allow the state to place anyone on the registry who had been convicted or pleaded guilty to a registrable offense before the sex offender registration law went into effect on January 1, 1995. and remanded the case for further consideration in light of that holding. On remand, the Jackson County Circuit Court entered an injunction ordering that the applicable individuals be removed from the published sex offender list. Defendant Colonel James Keathley appealed that order to the Missouri Court of Appeals in Kansas City, which affirmed the injunction on April 1, 2008. Keathley filed an appeal with the Supreme Court of Missouri.

In response to these rulings, in 2007, several Missouri state Senators proposed an amendment to the Missouri Constitution that would exempt sex offender registration laws from bar on retrospective civil laws. The proposed amendment passed the State Senate unanimously but was not passed by the Missouri House of Representatives before the end of the 2007 legislative session. The same constitutional amendment was proposed in and passed by the Missouri Senate again in 2008, but also was not passed by the House of Representatives by the end of that year's legislative session. As a result, the decisions of the Missouri courts prohibiting the retrospective application of sex offender laws remained intact.

The Missouri Supreme Court ruled on Keathley's appeal (Doe v. Phillips now styled Doe v. Keathley) on June 16, 2009. The Court held that the Missouri Constitution's provision prohibiting laws retrospective in operation no longer exempts individuals from registration if they are subject to the independent Federal obligation created under the Sexual Offenders Registration and Notification Act (SORNA), 42 U.S.C. § 16913. As a result, many offenders who were previously exempt under the Court's 2006 holding in Doe v. Phillips were once again required to register.

On January 12, 2010, Cole County Circuit Judge Richard Callahan ruled that individuals who plead guilty to a sex offense are not required to register under Federal Law and thus are not required to register in Missouri if the date of their plea was prior to the passage of the Missouri registration law.

Missouri also has a number of laws that restrict the activities of persons required to register as sex offenders, several of which have also been challenged as being retrospective in their operation. On February 19, 2008, the Supreme Court of Missouri held that a law prohibiting registered sex offenders from residing within 1,000 feet of a school was retrospective in operation as applied to registered sex offenders who had resided at a location within such a distance prior to the enactment of the law. Another exception to the school-residence proximity requirement was handed down by the Court on January 12, 2010 in F.R. v. St. Charles County Sheriff's Department. In this case, F.R. was convicted prior to the enactment of the law and the Court held that, as such, he was not required to abide by the restriction. Consolidated with F.R. was State of Missouri v. Raynor, in which the Court found that Charles A. Raynor was not required to comply with R.S.Mo. § 589.426, a law restricting the activities of registered sex offenders on Halloween. In both F.R. and Raynor, the ruling applies only to the named party.

== See also ==
- Murder of Dru Sjodin
