= Murder of LaToyia Figueroa =

2005 murder of an American woman of Hispanic and Black descent

LaToyia Figueroa
- Born: January 26, 1981
- Disappeared: July 18, 2005
- Died: August 2005 (age 24)
- Cause of death: Strangulation
- Body discovered: Chester, Pennsylvania, US
- Partner: Stephen Poaches
- Children: 1 daughter & 1 unborn child - was five months pregnant at death

LaToyia Figueroa (January 26, 1981 – August 2005) was an American woman of African-American and Hispanic descent who was murdered in 2005. Figueroa, who was five months pregnant at the time, was reported missing on July 18, 2005, after she failed to show up to work. She was later found strangled to death after being featured on America's Most Wanted.

Police discovered Figueroa's remains in a grassy, partially wooded lot in Chester, Pennsylvania, located 13 miles south of Philadelphia. They arrested Stephen Poaches, the father of her unborn child, on August 20, more than a month after she was reported missing. On October 17, 2006, Poaches was convicted of two counts of first-degree murder for the deaths of Figueroa and her unborn child.

The disappearance and murder of Figueroa sparked controversy about media coverage because cable news channels, such as CNN, MSNBC, and Fox News Channel, neglected to cover her story while focusing most of their attention on the case of Natalee Holloway, a Caucasian teen missing on the island of Aruba. Some observers protested that Figueroa's case was similar to the Laci Peterson case (which also covered the same timespan) and thus deserved greater attention, implying that race was a factor in the lack of coverage.

== Disappearance ==
On July 18, 2005, 24 years old and five months pregnant, LaToyia went to a prenatal checkup with the father of her unborn child, 25-year-old Stephen Poaches. Afterward they went to his apartment. Poaches later stated that LaToyia had left his home "peaceably" around 5pm however, LaToyia did not pick up her 7-year-old daughter that evening nor did she show up for her shift at the restaurant where she worked.

After she was reported missing, Poaches told police that he knew nothing about LaToyia's disappearance and did not participate in any search efforts. Poaches then called a radio station to defend himself against suspicion.

== Investigation ==
In the weeks following her disappearance, detectives searched Poaches's home and car and found no evidence of a crime. Police also did not find any evidence of credit card use or cellphone activity by Latoyia and thus she was categorized by police officials as a missing person. Her father, Melvin Figueroa organized on his own, search teams throughout the city for weeks following her disappearance. As relatives and friends papered the city with flyers, a reward for information reached $100,000 which included donations from the restaurant where she worked and Philadelphia rapper, Beanie Sigel. It was reported that police and the media took almost two weeks to focus any meaningful attention to her case prior to TV host Nancy Grace began to do nationally televised reporting on her disappearance.

Well over a month after her disappearance, police detectives received a tip from an acquaintance of Poaches stating that he had contacted them the evening prior asking to borrow a truck and inquiring about a body bag. Police then followed Poaches from his home to a grassy, partially wooded lot in Chester, 13 miles outside of Philadelphia. He was wearing a bulletproof vest and carrying a gun. There police discovered LaToyia's remains. Poaches was arrested and a judge ruled that prosecutors had enough evidence to try him on 2 counts of 1st degree murder for Latoyia and their unborn child. Police stated that Poaches had strangled Latoyia hours after returning from the pre-natal appointment.

As of 2010, Stephen Poaches, Pennsylvania Department of Corrections #GV2311, is located in the State Correctional Institution – Houtzdale.

== Response ==
Figueroa's family stated that the lack of media coverage of her disappearance only brought more tragedy to an already troubled search. Figueroa's mother, Ann Taylor, was murdered when LaToyia was a toddler. Figueroa had a seven-year-old daughter. Joseph Taylor, Figueroa's uncle and family spokesman, has actively criticized the media. America's Most Wanted and the Philadelphia Citizen Crime Commission teamed up with police to aid in the search. A $100,000 reward was funded by rap stars Beanie Sigel (while in a prison) and Damon Dash, Beneficial Bank, T.G.I. Fridays, local philanthropists Joe Mammanaand, Kal Rudman, and Internet bloggers to help the family in the search for LaToyia.

=== Media coverage controversy ===
The disappearance of Figueroa has spawned controversy about media coverage of missing people and how cases get national attention, with the terms "Missing White Women Syndrome." PBS journalist Gwen Ifill referred to the phenomenon as "The Missing White Woman Syndrome" at the Unity Convention of Journalists in 2004. This phrase was invoked by Professor of American Studies Sheri L. Parks on March 13, 2006 during an interview with American news reporter, Anderson Cooper to describe a phenomenon characterized by critics as a short and cynical equation: Pretty, white damsels in distress draw viewers; missing women who are black, Latino, Asian, old, fat, or ugly do not. Critics accused major news outlets of ignoring Figueroa's disappearance to focus on cases involving young, usually attractive, white women like Laci Peterson who was also pregnant when she was reported missing.

Several internet bloggers began writing about the inadequate coverage cable news networks gave to missing people of color and pressured them to give equal coverage of non-white young American women like Natalee Holloway and Jennifer Wilbanks; they succeeded in gaining attention and Figueroa's case received coverage by major news outlets such as CNN, MSNBC, and Fox News Channel. Conservative blogger Michelle Malkin, referred to this phenomenon as "Pretty Girl Syndrome" and said, "I'm embarrassed that there's so much air time absorbed by the latest missing-girl story." The Figueroa case bears a similarity to the case of Laci Peterson, who was found dead and whose husband, Scott, was found guilty of her murder. The Peterson case was covered heavily throughout 2004 and led to public consensus that Scott Peterson was guilty of the murder.

== See also ==
- List of solved missing person cases (2000s)
