= Murder of Danielle Jones =

English murder case where no body was found

Danielle Jones
- Photograph of Danielle Jones
- Born: Danielle Sarah Jones; 16 October 1985; East Tilbury, Essex, England
- Disappeared: 18 June 2001 (aged 15)
- Status: Missing for 25 years, 3 months and 17 days; declared dead in absentia on 28 July 2005 (aged 19)
- Died: c. 18 June 2001 (aged 15); Unknown
- Cause of death: Murder
- Height: 1.73 m (5 ft 8 in)
- Parent(s): Anthony and Linda Jones

The murder of Danielle Jones was a 2001 child murder case involving a 15-year-old schoolgirl who disappeared from East Tilbury, Essex, England.

There was a large and exhaustive search to find Danielle Jones following her disappearance in June 2001, making it one of the biggest cases Essex Police had to deal with at the time. The emphasis of the inquiry later changed to the search for a body within a few months, as police were convinced that she had been murdered. Despite the extensive search, her body was never found. Her disappearance made national headlines and the case received significant media coverage. It is considered a high-profile case in Essex.

Five months after Danielle Jones was last seen alive, her uncle Stuart Campbell was charged with her abduction and murder. He was convicted on 19 December 2002, and was sentenced to life imprisonment for murder as well as 10 years for abduction. The conviction relied largely upon forensic authorship analysis of text messages sent on the victim's mobile phone.

After the trial, controversy arose when it was revealed Campbell had prior convictions for indecent assault on teenage girls. The use of forensic authorship analysis of text messages in the case provoked research into its use in other cases.

== Disappearance and investigation ==
15-year-old Danielle Sarah Jones was last seen near her home in East Tilbury, Essex, on the morning of 18 June 2001, while walking to a bus stop.

Suspicion fell on Campbell almost immediately and he was first arrested on 23 June 2001, five days after Jones went missing. Detectives had delayed his arrest while weighing the possibility of endangering Jones's life, on the presumption she was still alive and being held against her will, against the possibility of Campbell leading the police to her.

The investigation included several appeals to the public for information, including a reconstruction on the BBC television programme Crimewatch. During the investigation, more than 900 police officers and support staff searched more than 1500 locations for Jones's body, as within two months of her disappearance police working on the case were convinced that she was dead. Despite an extensive search, her body was never found.

== Murder trial ==
Stuart Campbell
- Born: Stuart James Campbell; 21 February 1958 (age 68); Maldon, Essex, England
- Occupation: Builder
- Spouse: Debbie Jones
- Children: 2
- Status: Incarcerated
- Convictions: Murder, abduction (2002); Unlawful detainment of a minor (1989)
- Penalty: Life imprisonment with the possibility of parole after 20 years, concurrent sentence of 10 years in prison (2002); 12-month suspended sentence (1989)

On 17 August 2001, police re-arrested Campbell on suspicion of murder, after finding "significant evidence" that appeared to support their theory that Danielle Jones was now dead.

A police superintendent said to the BBC that Campbell "developed a relationship with Danielle that was certainly inappropriate and probably unlawful." Jones apparently tried to disengage, but Campbell resisted. By 14 November 2001, the Crown Prosecution Service decided that the police had enough evidence to charge Campbell with murder – even though her body had not been found.

On 14 October 2002, Campbell went on trial for abduction and murder before Mr Justice McKinnon and a jury, having spent 11 months on remand. The Crown's case rested upon several pieces of evidence. Jones had disappeared without contacting her parents and had been seen talking to a man in a blue Ford Transit van resembling Campbell's on the morning of her disappearance. The testing of blood-stained stockings discovered in the loft of Campbell's house found DNA matching both himself and his niece; lip gloss used by Jones was also found in Campbell's home. A diary kept by Campbell revealed an obsession with teenage girls, with testimonies that Campbell had manipulated young girls into posing for topless photographs.

HI STU THANKZ 4 BEIN SO NICE UR THE BEST UNCLE EVER! TELL MUM I'M SO SORRY LUVYA LOADZ DAN XXX

— The text message that Campbell claimed Jones had sent to him. The message was sent in uppercase; however, Danielle habitually sent messages in lowercase.

Mobile Switching Centre records demonstrated that Campbell's alibi of being at a D-I-Y store half an hour away in Rayleigh was false and that Campbell's and Jones's mobile phones had been within the range of a single mobile phone mast at the time that a text message had allegedly been sent by Jones to Campbell. This, along with forensic authorship analysis, indicated that Campbell had written the message, not Jones, implying that Campbell had sent the message to himself using Jones's phone to make it appear that she was still alive.

Campbell was found guilty of both charges on 19 December 2002 and sentenced by Mr Justice McKinnon to life imprisonment for murder to run concurrently with a 10-year sentence for abduction. The High Court later ruled that Campbell should serve a minimum of 20 years before being considered for parole, meaning that he would remain imprisoned until at least November 2021 and the age of 63. In January 2023, he was refused parole.

== Aftermath ==
After his trial it was revealed that, in 1989, Campbell had received a 12-month suspended sentence for forcibly detaining a 14-year-old girl in his house and taking indecent photographs of her.

The use of text-message evidence in the trial led a group of researchers at the University of Leicester to begin studying text-messaging styles under the hypothesis that forensic research into the authorship analysis of such messages might help in future criminal cases.

In 2004 Campbell was granted leave to appeal against his conviction, on the grounds that evidence of his obsession with Jones, and of his interest in schoolgirls, should have been excluded at his trial and on the further grounds that one of the jurors, the next-door neighbour of a police officer involved in the case, should have been discharged. The appeal was dismissed in 2005 by the Court of Appeal.

On 28 July 2005, an inquest by the coroner was held into Danielle Jones's disappearance, returning a verdict of unlawful killing. Police interviews with Campbell in prison reported that Campbell had still refused to tell them where he had disposed of his victim's body.

In May 2017, Essex and Kent Police forces began searching a garage block in Stifford Clays, Thurrock, after receiving new information, and "did not rule out" looking for a body. It was reported that similar information, regarding suspicious activity around the garages, had been received at the time of Jones' disappearance, but had not been followed up in the initial investigation. A spokesperson for Essex Police said the force was "working to ascertain why these were not searched as part of the original investigation." It was subsequently announced that no discovery had been made.

More than 20 years into his life sentence, Campbell made an application for parole, which was rejected in January 2023. In December 2025, a further application for parole was rejected due to Campbell's "unwillingness to disclose the location" of Jones' body.

== See also ==
- List of solved missing person cases (2000s)
- Murder of Tia Rigg
- Murder of Zohra Shah
- Disappearance of Suzy Lamplugh – whose body, like Jones', was never found
- Murder of Hannah Williams
