= Murder of Tia Sharp =

2012 child murder in London, England

Tia Sharp
- Born: Tia Christine Sharp; 30 June 2000; Croydon, London, United Kingdom
- Disappeared: 2 August 2012 (aged 12); New Addington, London, United Kingdom
- Died: 3 August 2012 (aged 12); New Addington, South London, United Kingdom
- Cause of death: Homicide of undetermined aetiology
- Body discovered: New Addington, South London, United Kingdom
- Resting place: Merton and Sutton Joint Cemetery; Morden, London Borough of Merton, United Kingdom
- Known for: Murder victim
- Parents: Steven Carter (father); Natalie Sharp (mother)

Stuart Hazell
- Born: Stuart Edward Hazell; 26 May 1975 (age 51)
- Status: In prison
- Conviction: Murder
- Criminal charges: Murder
- Penalty: Life imprisonment (38-year minimum term)

Details
- Date apprehended: 10 August 2012
- Imprisoned at: HM Prison Belmarsh; HM Prison Wakefield

The murder of Tia Sharp (30 June 2000 – 3 August 2012) was a high-profile case of child murder in the United Kingdom. The victim was a 12-year-old girl, Tia Sharp, who was reported missing from and later found dead at her grandmother's home in New Addington, London, in August 2012. After her body was discovered, police arrested her grandmother, Christine Bicknell, and Bicknell's then-boyfriend, Stuart Hazell, on suspicion of murder. Hazell was charged with Tia's murder on 12 August.

Five days into his trial at the Old Bailey in May 2013, Hazell changed his plea from not guilty to guilty. He was sentenced to life imprisonment with the judge setting a minimum term of 38 years.

== Disappearance ==
Stuart Hazell told police that Tia Sharp had left the house on 3 August 2012 to travel to Croydon, five miles away, to buy shoes in the Whitgift Centre.

On 7 August, Sharp's uncle, David Sharp, made a televised plea for her safe return. Fifty-five sightings were reported by members of the public, but none were substantiated. Eighty police officers were assigned to the search, and 800 hours of CCTV footage were collected. On 9 August, Hazell gave an interview to Mark Williams-Thomas for ITV News, denying that he had done anything to Sharp and praying for her safe return.

== Investigation ==
On 10 August, a body was discovered wrapped in a black bed sheet inside a black bag in the loft of the home of Sharp's grandmother, after police visited it for the fourth time. Police launched a search for Hazell, and arrested him on suspicion of murder that evening at 8:25 p.m. at Cannon Hill Common, Morden, after a tip-off from a member of the public. It was later announced that two further arrests had been made: Sharp's grandmother, Christine Bicknell, on suspicion of murder, and Bicknell's neighbour, Paul Meehan, on suspicion of assisting an offender. Bicknell and Meehan were subsequently bailed. Commander Neil Basu, the officer in charge of the investigation, apologised to Sharp's mother for the delay in finding her daughter's body. He blamed human error and said that a review would be undertaken "to ensure such a failing is not repeated". Shortly after Hazell's arrest, memory cards were recovered from Christine Bicknell's residence. One was particularly well hidden in a door frame on the ground floor of the property. Police were able to recover images and videos, some of which had been deleted. Some of the files portrayed Sharp in sexual positions, believed to have been taken post-mortem, whereas others were voyeuristic images of when Sharp was still alive, for example videos of her applying moisturiser to her legs, or of her asleep in her bedroom. Forensic psychologist Keri Nixon suggested that Hazell may have kept these images for later sexual gratification.

In the early hours of 12 August, Hazell was charged with the murder of Sharp. He appeared before Camberwell Green Magistrates' Court on 13 August via video-link. No plea was entered and the case was committed to the Old Bailey for trial, with a first appearance on 15 August, also via video-link, with a preliminary hearing set for 19 November and a provisional trial date set for 21 January 2013. He was remanded in custody to Belmarsh prison where he was kept in isolation for his own safety.

A post-mortem on the body began on 10 August, and paused later that day. By 16 August, the post-mortem had still not been completed, but at an inquest into the death, which opened that day, it was confirmed that the body was that of Sharp. The moderate decomposition of the body meant the post-mortem later concluded without establishing the cause of death. Experts told This is Croydon Today that the delay in finding the body made it much harder to establish the cause of death, and that without a cause of death the prosecution would find it much harder to build a case. However, detectives suspected, and it was widely reported, that Sharp was smothered, although this was not officially proven to be the cause of death. Nixon suggested that Hazell may have made sexual advances towards Tia, and murdered her when she rebuffed him and threatened to tell her mother.

On 23 August police commissioner Bernard Hogan-Howe addressed his force's failure to find Sharp's body. He said the error could not be attributed to a single officer, and that he wanted to "understand what processes and management decisions we've made that led to that failure."

Sharp was cremated on 14 September, after a private family funeral.

== Court proceedings ==
It was announced on 26 November 2012 that Hazell would face trial in May 2013. On 7 December, the Metropolitan Police announced that Christine Bicknell would not face charges.

Hazell pleaded not guilty to murder when he appeared in court on 8 March 2013. The trial of Hazell began on 7 May 2013 before Mr Justice Nicol. On 13 May, Hazell changed his plea to guilty and was sentenced to life imprisonment on 14 May with a minimum term of 38 years, meaning he will be 75 years old before he is eligible for parole.

== Aftermath ==
In June 2013, Sharp's biological father, Steven Carter, announced that he was going to be a father again, as his girlfriend was pregnant. In July 2013, Carter said he backed a plan for websites to be told to block certain search terms and warn people when they try to view illegal content.

In June 2013, the home of Bicknell and Hazell, where Sharp was murdered, was demolished and in mid-2014, work began on new houses being built on the site.

In November 2013, partly in response to the murders of Sharp and April Jones, the search engines Google and Bing modified their systems to block results from searches aimed at producing child abuse images.

== See also ==
- List of solved missing person cases (post-2000)
