= List of unsolved murders (2000–present) =

This list of unsolved murders includes notable cases where victims have been murdered in unknown circumstances.

== 2000s ==
- Pavle Bulatović (51), socialist Yugoslav politician and former Minister of Defence, was shot to death at a restaurant in Belgrade on 7 February 2000. His assailant was never apprehended, but the murder is suspected to have been carried out by Montenegrin nationalists.
- Casey McCann (56–57) was an anti-cult activist who was murdered in São Paulo, Brazil, in his apartment on 26 February 2000, by unknown people.
- The 2000 Uganda cult massacres refers to 778 people who were found dead on 17 March 2000 in Uganda. Although they were originally thought to have died in a mass suicide, it was later changed to mass murder since the victims are known to have been strangled and stabbed. Whoever was behind the killings is unknown.
- Nikole Bakoles (19) went missing in March 2000, and her remains were found 7 months later. She is believed to have been murdered.
- William Pokhlyobkin (76) was a foremost expert on the history of Russian cuisine and the author of numerous culinary books. Pokhlyobkin was found murdered in his apartment in Podolsk some time between 27 and 31 March 2000. His body was discovered by the chief editor of the Polyfakt publishing house, who was worried about the delay of the book Cuisine of the Century and had come from Moscow to Podolsk to see Pokhlyobkin.
- Radio Haiti-Inter journalist Jean Dominique (69) and Jean-Claude Louissaint, another station employee, were fatally shot outside the station as Dominique arrived at the station's offices in Port-au-Prince on the morning of 3 April 2000. Political pressure and threats, possibly from those whose corruption Dominique reported on, have allegedly hindered the investigation. At least two suspects in the murders later died in suspicious circumstances; three others were indicted but escaped from prison before trial.
- Žika Petrović (60–61), a Serbian business executive and CEO of Jat Airways, was shot to death by two masked men in front of his parents' home in Belgrade on 25 April 2000. His killers have never been apprehended.
- André Desjardins (69) was a Canadian union official noted for his involvement with organized crime. Desjardins served as the president of the Conseil des métiers de la construction and vice president of the Fédération des travailleurs du Québec (Quebec Federation of Labour, FTQ) union between 1970 and 1974, becoming known as Le roi de la construction ("the king of construction"). During this time, Desjardins was involved in the scandal that led to the Cliche commission of 1974–75 headed by Judge Robert Cliche to examine corruption in Quebec construction unions. Afterward, Desjardins was one of the leading loan sharks in Montreal until his murder by unknown persons on 27 April 2000.
- Mark Moran (35), of Australia's Moran crime family, was shot and killed outside his Aberfeldie home on the evening of 15 June 2000.
- Molly Bish (16), American teenage girl who disappeared from Warren, Massachusetts on 27 June 2000 and was found dead on 9 June 2003. Her murder remains unsolved.
- Kirsty Jones (23), a British national who was on holiday in Thailand, was found raped and strangled in her hotel room in Chiang Mai on 10 August 2000. Her killer was never identified, and the statute of limitations on the case ran out in 2020.
- A 17 August 2000 bombing at the Centrs shopping mall in Riga, the capital of Latvia, killed one person. A suspect arrested and tried for planting one of the bombs was acquitted a year later by the country's Supreme Court. No one else has ever been identified.
- On 24 September, 2000, 20-year-old Tina Jørgensen (NO) vanished from Stavanger, Norway. Her body was found over a month later during an unrelated search. She had been beaten to death.
- Loyalist paramilitarant Jackie Coulter (46) was shot and killed on 21 August 2000, along with Bobby Mahood, a former member of the Ulster Volunteer Force, while sitting in a parked car along Crumlin Road in Belfast, Northern Ireland. While the Progressive Unionist Party later admitted that the UVF, its military wing, had carried out the killings in reprisal for an attack on it by members of Coulter's rival Ulster Defence Association, no suspects have ever been named. It is believed the real target may have been Mahood's brother, Jackie, who the killers may have mistaken him for. Coulter and Bobby Mahood were reportedly trying to broker an end to Loyalist feud that claimed both their lives.
- The Persian Princess, or Persian Mummy, is a mummy of an alleged Persian princess who surfaced in Pakistani Baluchistan in October 2000. After considerable attention and further investigation, the mummy proved to be an archaeological forgery and possibly a murder victim. Her identity remains unknown.
- Bubby Dacer and his driver, Emmanuel Corbito, were two people in the Philippines who were found murdered two days after being kidnapped in November 2000. The people behind their killings remain unknown.
- Haris Brkić (26) was a Yugoslav basketball player who played for Partizan. He was shot on 15 December 2000, by an unknown assailant while unlocking his car at the parking lot in front of Pionir Hall in Belgrade. Brkić died three days later. It is still not known who had killed him.
- Mikio Miyazawa, his wife Yasuko, and their children Niina and Rei were murdered in their Setagaya, Tokyo home on 31 December 2000. Police were able to find a considerable amount of forensic evidence, including undigested food in excrement, that could help identify a suspect, but no arrests were ever made. The case led to the abolition of Japan's statute of limitations for murder in 2010.
- Gaffar Okkan (49), a Turkish police chief, was assassinated on 24 January 2001 in an ambush in Diyarbakır, southeastern Turkey.
- Jill-Lyn Euto (18), a student, was found stabbed to death in her sixth-floor apartment at 600 James St, Syracuse, New York, on 28 January 2001. No arrests have been made.
- Miodrag Stojanović (50), a Montenegrin Serb kickboxer and MMA fighter, with ties to organized crime, was shot and killed by an assassin at his home in Belgrade, Serbia on 18 February 2001. To this day, his killer has not been apprehended.
- Bonny Lee Bakley (44) was the second wife of actor Robert Blake. Bakley was fatally shot while sitting in Blake's parked car outside a Los Angeles area restaurant in May 2001. In 2002, Robert Blake was charged with Bakley's murder, solicitation of murder, conspiracy, and special circumstance of lying in wait. In March 2005, a jury found Blake not guilty of the crimes. Seven months later, Blake was found liable in a wrongful death lawsuit brought against him by Bakley's children. Officially, Bakley's murder remains unsolved.
- On 1 May 2001, Chandra Levy (24), a college student who had just ended an internship with the Federal Bureau of Prisons, disappeared after leaving her Washington, DC apartment building. Her remains were found on 22 May 2002 in Washington's Rock Creek Park. A suspect was tried and convicted but the charges were dropped after the verdict was overturned on appeal.
- Peggy Knobloch (9), a girl from Lichtenberg, Bavaria, Germany, was kidnapped and murdered on 7 May 2001. Her body was found 15 years later in a forest near Wurzbach. In 2020, investigators shelved the investigation of her murder without solving it.
- Koby Mandell and Yosef Ishran (age 13 and 14 respectively), were two Jewish teenagers murdered on the outskirts of the Israeli settlement of Tekoa in the West Bank. The teenagers' bodies were discovered in a cave the following morning. Both had been bound, stabbed and bludgeoned to death with rocks. The identity of the perpetrators has never been determined, though Israel and a number of sources believe unidentified Palestinian terrorists were responsible.
- Abraham Grünbaum (71), a Polish-Israeli orthodox rabbi who led a yeshiva in Bnei Brak, was murdered while on his way to a prayer session in Zürich, Switzerland. While connections were suggested to a right-wing terrorist group, nobody has been arrested in his murder.
- Milan Pantić (46), a journalist for the Serbian newspaper Večernje Novosti, was shot to death in front of his apartment in Jagodina, Serbia on 11 June 2001. It's suspected that his killing was related to his work, as he had previously been threatened over the phone.
- The body of a 15-to-16-year-old girl, nicknamed the Girl from the Main, was found floating along the Main in Nied, Germany on 31 July 2001. She had apparently suffered serious physical abuse prior to her murder, probably over the years. The decedent is thought to originate from the Pakistan-Afghanistan border area, but lived in Frankfurt am Main. In May 2026, she was identified as 16-year-old Diana S. of Offenbach. Her father was arrested on suspicion of murder.
- Antônio da Costa Santos (46) was a Brazilian politician and architect who on 10 September 2001 after leaving a shopping mall in São Paulo on his drive back home was shot dead during the night. Whoever shot him is unknown.
- Henryk Siwiak (46), a Polish immigrant to New York City, was shot and killed on a Bedford-Stuyvesant street known for its heavy drug activity, on the night of 11 September 2001. He is officially the only homicide victim in the city on that day, since the victims of the September 11 attacks are not included in crime statistics. The diversion of police resources in the aftermath of the attacks constrained the investigation. No suspects have ever been identified.
- Thomas C. Wales (49) was an American federal prosecutor and gun control advocate. On 11 October 2001, he was killed by a bullet fired through the window of his basement home-office in Seattle, Washington. No suspects have been charged, and the investigation continues.
- Digna Ochoa (37) was a human rights lawyer in Mexico. She was born in Misantla, in the state of Veracruz; she was killed on 19 October 2001 in Mexico City. Her body was found in the law office where she worked. A note was found by her body, warning the members of the human rights law center where she had recently worked that the same thing could happen to them.
- Jimmy Millen (27), a doorman heavily involved in the criminal underworld, was shot outside his home in Hastings by two men on a motorcycle on 24 October 2001. No suspects have been identified, although the murder may have been related to Millen's involvement in the murder of Jason Martin-Smith two months earlier.
- Five people died as a result of the U.S. 2001 anthrax attacks in autumn of that year. However, no one has ever been arrested in the case. Biowarfare researcher Bruce Edwards Ivins (62) killed himself in 2008 just before he was supposedly to be charged. He was the FBI's prime suspect. Others, including some of the targets of the attacks, have disputed that conclusion, or believed he may not have been acting alone.
- Kent Heitholt (48), sports editor of Missouri's Columbia Daily Tribune, was found beaten and strangled in his car at the newspaper's parking lot early on 1 November 2001. Ryan W. Ferguson was convicted of the murder in 2005, despite strongly protesting his innocence; eight years later, he was released, after the two key witnesses against him said they had been pressured to lie on the stand. No other suspects have been named in the case.
- Odunayo Olagbaju was a Nigerian politician who was an Osun State legislator. He was stabbed to death in December 2001 right in front of a police station in Ile Ife, Nigeria. In May 2002, eleven suspects were arrested for the killing. In August, seven additional suspects were arrested. By the end of 2002, the original eleven had been freed on bail, but the incident remained under investigation, and has not been solved.
- Nigerian Minister of Justice Bola Ige (71) was shot and killed in his Ibadan home on 23 December 2001. Several suspects have been tried in the case; all were acquitted. No other suspects have been identified.
- Sara Ann Lewis Trusty (23), American woman who disappeared after she was last seen on 2 July 2002 in the evening in Algoa, Texas while she was riding her bicycle close to her church. She was found dead on 28 July 2002 after being discovered in a Texas City reservoir. Her killer is unknown.
- John Gilbride (34), a baggage handler for US Airways at Philadelphia International Airport, was shot dead in his car outside his home in Maple Shade, New Jersey, on 10 September 2002. He was involved in a custody dispute with his former wife, the widow of the founder of the radical group MOVE, and was worried that members of the group might carry out threats they had made to kill him. While other former members of MOVE believe the group is responsible, and current members assert in turn that the murder was either faked or that the government did it in an attempt to frame them, it has also been suggested that gambling debts were involved. No suspects have been identified.
- Jennifer Servo (22), a TV news reporter, was found beaten and strangled in her Abilene, Texas, apartment on 16 September 2002. Police have suspected either her former boyfriend or a co-worker she had begun a new relationship with, but so far lack the evidence to arrest either.
- Nozomi Momoi (24), a Japanese AV idol was found dead by the Narai River on 12 October 2002. A nearby burned-out car contained the remains of her male companion. Nozomi had been stabbed at least six times, covered with gasoline and set on fire about 10 meters from the car. The police called it a possible murder-suicide pact, however in the months after the incident, the parents of Momoi's male companion objected to the murder-suicide theory. His parents unsuccessfully brought a case against the local police and when their insurance company refused to pay because of their son's supposed suicide, they sued Sumitomo Life Insurance. In October 2006, the civil court at Nagano ruled in favor of the parents that the two deaths were due to murder by a third party. No further progress had been made in the criminal case.
- Francis Imbard (58), a French male nightclub manager was shot dead on 26 February 2003 in Paris, France by an unknown person. The case remains unsolved.
- Ilia Pavlov (42), a Bulgarian banker, financier and alleged member of the Bulgarian mafia, was shot to death in his office on 7 March 2003. While authorities stated that a sniper had taken him out, his killer was never arrested.
- Bulgarian-born Australian mobster Nik Radev (44) was shot fatally as he got out of his car on 15 April 2003, in the Melbourne, Australia suburb of Coburg. Like many other Melbourne gangland killings, police believe it was related to his criminal activities, and suspect a rival drug dealer, but have not made any arrests.
- Tamara Greene (27) was shot dead on 30 April 2003 while sitting in her car near the intersection of Roselawn and West Outer Drive in Detroit. Greene, who worked as an exotic dancer, had allegedly been assaulted by the wife of Detroit Mayor Kwame Kilpatrick several months earlier after Kilpatrick hired her to dance for him at a party at his mayoral residence, and Kilpatrick was accused of interfering in the investigation, leading to theories that he had Greene killed to prevent evidence of the party from coming to light. Other theories include that the shooter was targeting Greene's boyfriend, who was with her at the time, or that she was killed by an angry ex-boyfriend.
- Edelio López Falcón (37–38), also known as "El Yeyo", was suspected of being a drug lord and former member of a major criminal group called the Gulf Cartel, who were based in Tamaulipas. Even though López Falcón survived an attempt on his life once before, he was killed in Guadalajara on 6 May 2003. His killers are unknown, but investigators believe they were probably members of Los Zetas former paramilitary group, who were based in the Gulf Cartels.
- Blue Ridge Savings Bank murders, on 16 May 2003 three people inside the Blue Ridge Savings Bank in Greer, South Carolina were found dead in the bank's utility room, the three were identified as the bank's bank teller Sylvia Holtzclaw, physics professor James "Eb" Barnes and his wife a spinner and weaver Margaret "Maggie" Barnes.
- Jason Johnson, better known by his stage name Camoflauge (21), was an American rapper who was shot dead in Savannah, Georgia on 19 May 2003. The murder remains unsolved.
- On 13 August 2003, a group of Serbian children were fired upon by unknown assailants while playing in Goraždevac, Kosovo. Two of them were killed, while four others were injured. This incident is known as the Goraždevac murders.
- On 15 September 2003, two Singaporeans—26-year-old Tay Chow Lyang and 27-year-old Tony Tan Poh Chuan—were found murdered at their rented Sydney flat, and their third and only surviving flatmate Ram Puneet Tiwary (aged 24 in 2003) discovered the bodies. Tay was bludgeoned to death while Tan was killed upon arriving home after a lecture. Tiwary, who was also Singaporean, was charged nine months later with the murders and insisted his innocence. At first, Tiwary was found guilty and sentenced to life imprisonment without parole for Tan's murder while getting a concurrent 25 years for Tay's murder in 2006. However, Tiwary's appeal led to a re-trial in 2009, which once again issued a guilty verdict of murder and a reduced 48-year sentence in jail for Tiwary. As a result of his second appeal, Tiwary was finally acquitted due to lack of evidence and he returned to Singapore in 2012. The murderer(s) of Tay and Tan were never identified or caught as of today.
- In September 2003, a body was found among other bodies in Boston, that was thought to have been the remains of Paul McGonagle (35), an Irish-American mobster who had disappeared in November 1974, but this has not been proven to be true. The bodies' identities remain unknown.
- South African memoirist and socialite Hazel Crane (52), a close friend of Winnie Mandela, was shot and killed in her car while traveling to Johannesburg on 10 November 2003, where she was expected to testify in the trial of an Israeli man accused of killing her husband. She was the third witness in that trial to be killed.
- Katsuhiko Oku (45) was a Japanese diplomat, who played rugby for Oxford and Waseda University, who was killed on 23 November 2003, by persons unknown. No suspects have ever been identified.
- James Adarryl Tapp Jr., better known by his stage name Soulja Slim, was an American rapper and songwriter. He was known for writing the U.S. number one hit "Slow Motion". Tapp died on 26 November 2003, after an unknown assailant shot him four times, three in the face and once in the chest, on the front lawn of the home of his mother and stepfather, Phillip "Tuba Phil" Frazier of Rebirth Brass Band, in the Gentilly neighborhood of New Orleans.
- Daniel Larson (34), the owner of a recycling plant in Fort Hood named D&D Auto Recycling, and an ex-law enforcement officer and paramedics officer went missing on 17 December 2003 after he told his wife that he was meeting with members of the Mexican Mafia, when he never returned home his family reported him missing. On 28 December Larson's car was discovered at the Park & Ride at Highway 34 and Interstate I-25, in the trunk was a large amount of blood. On 13 January 2004 his remains were discovered in a field north of Kersey, Colorado near Weld County Road 388 and Weld County Road 59.
- Retired Major League Baseball outfielder Iván Calderón (41) was shot in the back several times outside a bar in his native Puerto Rico on 27 December 2003. No suspects have ever been identified.
- Patrice Endres (38), disappeared from her hair salon, Tamber's Trim-N-Tan, on Georgia Highway 369 on 15 April 2004, in Forsyth County, Georgia, around 11:30 am to 12:00 pm. Her skeletal remains were discovered by police on 6 December 2005, behind Lebanon Baptist Church in Dawson County, Georgia. Her murder remains unsolved.
- Jonathan Coulom (10) was abducted on the night of 7 April 2004 in Saint-Brevin-les-Pins, Loire-Atlantique. His body was found, bound with a cinderblock, in a pond in Guérande on 19 May 2004. A prison inmate claimed that German serial killer Martin Ney killed Coulom, but he has not been charged with the crime. (Ney has been extradited to France as of January 2021, and is now facing a French judge for Coulom's murder later this year.)
- Kaj Linna, a Finnish man who was accused of murdering a man named Robert Lindberg and was arrested in Swansea, Wales in 2004, three months after the murder and was remanded into custody on 12 July the same year. In 2005, Linna was sentenced to life imprisonment. He was later found to be innocent and set free. Robert Lindberg's killer has not been found.
- John Whitehead (55), half of the McFadden & Whitehead songwriting team, was shot fatally while fixing a car outside his Philadelphia home on 11 May 2004. It may have been a case of mistaken identity; however, no suspects have been named.
- Oakey Albert "Al" Kite Jr. (53) was found dead on May 25, 2004, in his home in Aurora, Colorado. He had been struck from behind while carrying a large recliner chair down into his basement. He was subsequently hog-tied and tortured for a number of hours, having his feet beaten and being stabbed above the eye and inside the ears by knives taken from his kitchen. Finally, he was stabbed 22 times and nearly decapitated. Kite's tenant, a man going by "Robert Cooper," is believed to be the perpetrator. Prior to meeting Kite, Cooper used a burner phone purchased from a 7-Eleven to contact potential landlords, travelling around Aurora to frustrate attempts to determine his location; he also waited 30 days before making any calls, as this was the time it took 7-Eleven stores to delete their CCTV footage. The name, address, social security number, and phone number Cooper provided were found to be false. Following the murder, Cooper cleaned the house, undid the bindings on Kite's body, used his shower, wore his clothes, ate his food, and slept in his bed for two days. He placed items he touched, including the knives used in the torture and murder of Kite, into Kite's kitchen sink and filled it with bleach, destroying DNA evidence. Finally, Cooper took Kite's truck, his wallet, his cellphone, and his debit card. He was last seen withdrawing $1,000 in cash from Kite's card at an ATM machine, wearing a ski mask, gloves, and driving Kite's truck. He abandoned this truck a block-and-a-half away from the home, also leaving his burner phone and Kite's phone in a phonebooth before disappearing. A blood droplet on the basement stairs indicated that Cooper had ancestry from the Balkans.
- Paul Klebnikov (41) was an American journalist and historian of Russian history. On 9 July 2004, while leaving the Forbes office, Klebnikov was attacked on a Moscow street late at night by unknown assailants who fired at him, and shot four times from a slowly moving car. He survived for a short while, but later died in the hospital. Though the murder appeared to be the work of assassins for hire, as of 2018, the organizers of the murder have yet to be identified.
- Paiche Onyemaechi (25), the daughter of a Malawian judge whose decapitated remains were discovered in Piltown, County Kilkenny, Ireland, on 23 July 2004. She had been missing since 10 July.
- Andre Louis Hicks, better known as his stage name Mac Dre (34), was an American rapper and record producer from California, who was murdered in Kansas City, Missouri on 1 November 2004 by an unknown person. The murder remains unsolved.
- Alistair Wilson (30) was shot on his doorstep in Nairn on 28 November 2004. The case was still under investigation as of 2023.
- Enrique Salinas (52), who was the brother of former Mexican president Carlos Salinas, was found dead with a plastic bag over his head in a parked car, in the municipality of Huixquilucan, Estado de México outskirts of Mexico City on 6 December 2004. The perpetrator behind Salinas' murder remains unknown.
- Deyda Hydara (50) was a co-founder and primary editor of The Point, a major independent Gambian newspaper. He was also a correspondent for both AFP News Agency and Reporters Without Borders for more than 30 years. Hydara also worked as a radio presenter in the Gambia, for a radio station called Radio Syd, during his early years as a freelance journalist. On 16 December 2004, he was assassinated by an unknown gunman while driving home from work in Banjul.
- In 2005, ten members of the local Musaev family were kidnapped and killed in Grozny; they were later found in a mass grave.
- The Jeff Davis 8: Eight women, all involved in prostitution and/or drugs, were found dead in Jefferson Davis Parish, Louisiana, between 2005 and 2009. Investigators initially believed they were murdered by a serial killer, but reporting by Ethan Brown has suggested instead that there are multiple suspects, and local law enforcement personnel may be complicit.
- On 9 February 2005, the body of Geetha Angara (43), was found in a water tank at a Totowa, New Jersey, water treatment plant; the autopsy showed that before drowning, she had been choked and beaten the previous day, around the time she was last seen. Investigators ruled the death a homicide; despite minimal forensic evidence, they were eventually able to narrow the case down to three suspects, since access to the plant was tightly controlled and usually limited to employees only. No arrests have ever been made.
- Françoise Chabé (28–29) was a French woman, murdered by strangulation on 26 February 2005 at her home in Humbercourt, in the Somme département of northern France. Her widower, Ludovic Chabé, was convicted of her murder in 2013, but was acquitted on appeal in 2015.
- Ihab el-Sherif (51), the Egyptian ambassador to Iraq, was kidnapped by Al-Qaeda in Iraq militants from Baghdad on 3 July 2005. Four days later, a video was uploaded of el-Sherif stating his identity, followed by an announcement that he had been killed. The claim was confirmed by the Egyptian government, but his killers have not been caught.
- Phillip Esposito (30) and Louis Allen (34), two U.S. soldiers deployed to Iraq, were fatally injured on 7 June 2005 when a claymore mine was detonated outside Esposito's window at Forward Operating Base Danger in Tikrit. Suspicion fell on Alberto Martinez, a soldier in Esposito's unit who had expressed a desire to frag him, but the evidence against Martinez was not conclusive and he was acquitted after a court-martial.
- Brett Kebble (41) was a South African mining magnate with close links to factions in the ruling political party, the African National Congress. Kebble was shot dead near a bridge over the M1 in Abbotsford, Johannesburg at around 9 p.m. on 27 September 2005 while driving to a dinner engagement with his business associate, Sello Rasethaba.
- The body of a toddler wrapped in a blanket off an interstate highway near Naperville in DuPage County, Illinois, on 8 October 2005 was identified six years later as Atcel Olmedo (2). The exact cause of death was impossible to determine due to the condition of his remains, but it appeared he had been severely beaten. His mother and stepfather are considered possible suspects; they are believed to have returned to Mexico.
- Stepan Senchuk (50) was the deputy of the Lviv regional council from 1994 to 1998, where he headed the Agrarian Party. He was shot dead on 29 November 2005 at 19:20 in his car. His killer is unknown.
- Adre-Anna Jackson (10) was a Native American girl who disappeared in December 2005 in Lakewood, Washington. In April 2006, children found her body that was skeletonized in Tillicum, Lakewood in a thicket. Whoever killed Jackson is not known.
- Tiago João da Silva (17) was a Brazilian robber who became known as the "Menino-aranha" (lit. spider-boy) because he scaled buildings to steal. He once scaled a 14-floor building, and scaled more than 40 buildings during his robbery spree, beginning when he was nine. He was murdered on 18 December 2005 by unknown assailants.
- Elson Becerra (27) was a Colombian footballer who was shot dead on 8 January 2006 in his hometown of Cartagena by people whose identities are unknown. No one has been arrested or charged with the murder.
- Tom Fox (54), an American peace activist affiliated with the Christian Peacemaker Teams, was abducted and killed by Islamic militants while on a mission in Baghdad, Iraq. His body was found in a garbage dump on 10 March 2006. The man believed to have ordered his killing, Muharib Abdul-Latif al-Jubouri, was never arrested, as he was killed a year later.
- Ifeoma Aggrey-Fynn (34), a Ghanaian-Nigerian media personality, writer and public speaker, who had gone to visit her parents at Aba in Abia State. She was on her way back to Port Harcourt on 2 June 2006, when the bus she was traveling in was attacked by armed bandits. As the driver was fleeing, the gunmen opened fire on the vehicle. Aggrey-Fynn was hit by bullets and died from her wounds. Her killers' identities remain unknown.
- Christopher Arepa and Cru Omeka Kahui were two New Zealand infants from a Māori family who died in Auckland's Starship Children's Hospital after being admitted with serious head injuries on 18 June 2006. Their family initially refused to cooperate with police in the homicide investigation into the children's deaths. The father, Chris Kahui, was charged with their murder. His defence was that the mother, Macsyna King, was responsible for the deaths. After a six-week trial, the jury took just one minute to acquit him. No other suspects have been named.
- Mario Condello (53), a member of the Australian Mafia, was fatally shot in the driveway of his Brighton home on 6 February 2006, the day before he was to stand trial for plotting to murder another mob boss, Carl Williams. While Williams would later be convicted of in turn conspiring to have Condello murdered, and police believe the killer was a hit man currently in prison for another killing, the murder officially remains unsolved.
- John Edward Hawkins, mostly known by his stage name Big Hawk (36), was a rapper from Houston, Texas who was murdered on 1 May 2006, by persons unknown in the very city that he was from. The murder remains unsolved.
- Frauke Liebs (21), a student nurse, disappeared on 27 June 2006, and on 4 October 2006, her skeletonized remains were found off a road near Lichtenau, Germany. She had last been seen leaving a bar on 20 June, and called her roommate several times in the days afterwards indicating she would come home, but was being vague about when or how. Although the body was too decomposed to establish a cause of death, the police now believe she was being held against her will and was murdered.
- On 24 July 2006, while searching the Římov Reservoir for a victim in an unrelated murder case, Czech authorities found the body of 37-year-old Roman Horáček, a fugitive serial killer who was charged with a 1990 murder after being paroled a double murder conviction. Horáček suffered severe injuries, was handcuffed and thrown into the reservoir, but coroners were unable to determine whether he died due to his injuries or drowning. A former cellmate of his was declared the prime suspect, but never charged due to a lack of conclusive evidence.
- Robert Wone (32) was murdered on 2 August 2006 in his friend's Washington, D.C. apartment. He was "restrained, incapacitated, and sexually assaulted" prior to his death. The only individuals present in the apartment at the time were its three residents, all friends of Wone. They have denied involvement and insisted that an intruder committed the crime. Authorities claim that there was no evidence of a break-in: the apartment appeared to be washed and cleaned, the three residents appeared freshly showered, and the evidence was not consistent with the residents' accounts. In addition, the residents tampered with the crime scene, waited an inordinate amount of time to call 911, and exhibited strange behavior when paramedics and police arrived. Authorities believe that either some, or all of the three house-mates murdered Wone, and engaged in a cover-up.
- Tair Rada was a 13-year-old Israeli girl whose body was found stabbed to death in a locked stall in her school's girls' bathroom in 2006. Her murder and the subsequent investigation were featured in a Netflix true crime docuseries, Shadow of Truth.
- Ubiratan Guimarães (63), known as Colonel Ubiratan, was a colonel in the São Paulo Military Police, and a Brazilian politician. He was the commanding officer responsible for the Carandiru massacre. Guimarães was killed under unclear circumstances in his São Paulo apartment, on 9 September 2006.
- Anna Politkovskaya (48) was a Russian journalist, writer, and human rights activist who was reporting political events in her country, mainly the Second Chechen War that was currently happening. She had previously been poisoned in retaliation for her work in journalism, but recovered after receiving treatment. On 7 October 2006, she was murdered in an elevator. Several suspects were charged, but the identity of her killer remains unknown.
- Terressa Lynn Vanegas (16), an American teenage girl who was last seen on 31 October 2006 in Dickinson, Texas while she was walking near the Green Caye Subdivision, was found dead three days later after being murdered. Her killer is still unknown.
- Movladi Baisarov (39–40) was a Chechen warlord and former Federal Security Service (FSB) special-task unit commander. Baisarov was shot dead on the street in central Moscow by members of the Chechen extra-agency guard on 18 November 2006.
- Jukka S. Lahti (51) was murdered in Ulvila, Finland on 1 December 2006. It is currently unknown who killed him, despite investigations having been conducted.

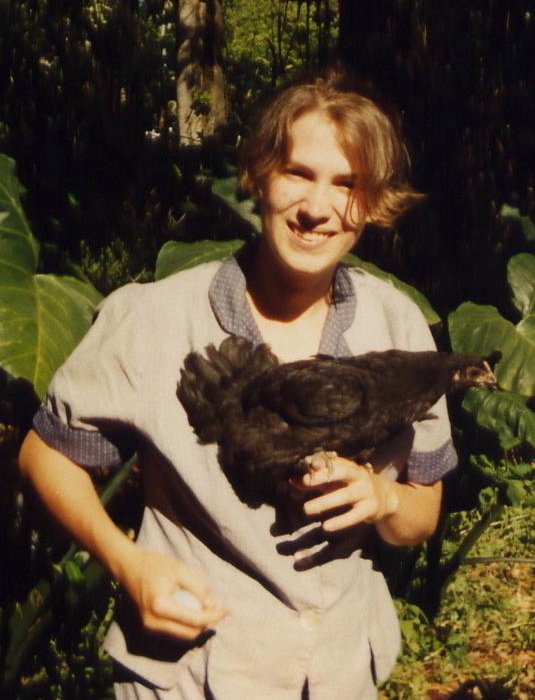
Filmmaker and social activist Helen Hill was murdered in 2007.

- Helen Hill (36), an animator who was fatally shot during an attempted robbery of her home in the Faubourg Marigny section of New Orleans on 4 January 2007. Her death was one of six murders in the city that day, which inspired a protest march, demanding a safer city in the wake of the disruptions caused by Hurricane Katrina. No suspect has ever been identified.
- Solange Grabenheimer (21) was murdered in Florida, Buenos Aires, Argentina on 10 January 2007. Her death remains unsolved after its prescription in January 2022.
- Daisaku Chiba (20), a first-year manga art student, was stabbed in Kyoto, Japan. He died from his injuries in the hospital.
- Beginning in February 2007, and lasting until August 2008, a series of 13 murders of gay men were committed in Paturis Park in Carapicuíba, Brazil. The killer, known as the "Rainbow Maniac", has yet to be identified.
- During a 19 February 2007 convoy to the Central American Parliament in Guatemala City, one car carrying three ARENA party members of the Salvadoran Congress, abruptly left the others for a dirt road near El Jocotillo. The burnt and tortured bodies of all three, along with their driver, were found in the vehicle a short distance away the following day. Four Guatemalan police officers were arrested shortly afterwards, but were then killed in prison two weeks later. Attempts to further investigate the crimes have resulted in either acquittals of suspects, or the murders of investigating officials.
- Frank Newbery was beaten to death inside his convenience store at Cooks Hill, Australia. His killer has not been found.
- Colorado marijuana activist Ken Gorman (51) was shot and killed in his home on 17 February 2007. The case remains open.
- On 14 March 2007, a torso was found that was thought to be that of Thiruchelvam Nihal Jim Brown (33–34), a minority Sri Lankan Tamil, Roman Catholic parish priest who disappeared with Wenceslaus Vinces Vimalathas during the Sri Lankan Civil War on 20 April 2006, and is presumed dead. However, the Sri Lankan government announced in June 2007 that subsequent DNA analyses had proved that the remains were not those of either man. Its identity remains unsolved.
- Michèle Kiesewetter (22) was a police officer from Germany, who was killed in Heilbronn on 25 April 2007 by neo-Nazi terrorists. The police are trying to find out further clues as to who the perpetrators are.
- Snehal Gaware (21), a resident of Dombivili, Thane, Maharashtra, in India, was murdered on 20 July 2007, allegedly by her boyfriend, who was arrested and charged with her murder in April 2010. He had continued his education in the United States in the meantime. Police dropped the charges the following year, citing a lack of evidence.
- Cedrika Provencher (9), disappeared on 31 July 2007 in Trois-Rivieres, Quebec, Canada. She was going door to door, helping a lady find her missing dog when she was last seen entering a Red Acura. Police interrogated 260 potential owners of this specific type of car; only one was from that area but the owner did not want to cooperate with the police and refused to run a polygraph. On 11 December 2015, remains of a body were found by hunters, along Highway 40, not far out of Trois-Rivieres. The following day, it was confirmed that these remains were of Cedrika. On 29 October 2016, Jonathan Bettez was arrested and charged with possession and distribution of juvenile pornography of children between 8–12 years of age and multiple pictures, including several of Cedrika Provencher. Unfortunately, the police could not search his vehicle, as it was in a cleaning shop near the border to the USA. On 18 October 2018, a judge revoked the accusations against him since the evidence against him was acquired illegally.
- Corryn Rayney (44) disappeared on 7 August 2007 and was found dead in a shallow grave in Kings Park, Western Australia on 16 August. The police's "prime and only suspect", her husband Lloyd Rayney, was found not guilty at trial. The case has not since been re-opened.
- Adnan Patrawala (16), the son of a businessman from Mumbai, India, was kidnapped for ransom by an unknown abductor on 18 August 2007, who murdered him the following day after the case began to gain publicity. Five people were accused of the crime, but all were acquitted, with Patrawala's murder remaining unsolved.
- Almost a month after she was last seen being forced into a van at a Kuala Lumpur, Malaysia wet market, the body of 8-year-old Nurin Jazlin was found stuffed in a bag outside a Petaling Jaya shop. She had apparently died hours earlier on 16 September 2007, of a bacterial infection resulting from injuries sustained during a sexual assault. Several suspects were arrested, but eventually released for lack of evidence; police have released a CCTV video showing the body being discarded by a motorcyclist, as well as several other people who may have been involved. However, they have not been able to identify any of them.
- Rizwanur Rahman (30), a computer graphics trainer who according to the Central Bureau of Investigation was forced to commit suicide on 21 September 2007 in West Bengal, India. He may have also been murdered.
- Shalita Middleton (17) was shot and killed on the Delaware State University campus in Dover, Delaware on 21 September 2007. A freshman student was initially charged with her murder, but the charges were dropped due to lack of evidence.
- Paul Quinn (21) died on 20 October 2007 in Drogheda, Ireland, after being beaten with farm implements by a group of people. He was beaten with such length and severity as to break every major bone in his body. It is believed his death was the result of a feud with local IRA members. No suspects have been named.
- John Pezzenti (55), a wildlife photographer, was found shot dead in his Anchorage, Alaska, apartment 3 December 2007. Neither a motive, nor a suspect, has emerged from the investigation.
- Yuriy Chervochkin (22) was a Russian opposition activist who was fatally attacked on 10 December 2007. In the early hours of 11 December 2007, Chervochkin died in hospital. His case shook Russian opposition, as he was attacked two days before the Dissenters' March, and some observers remained convinced that the perpetrators of the crime were members of the Russian Militsiya.
- Donald Young, Deacon and choir director at the future U.S. president Barack Obama's church, was found dead in his apartment on Sunday 23 December 2007 in Chicago after he had suffered multiple gunshot wounds to his head, shortly before the Barack Obama 2008 presidential campaign had begun. His killers are unknown.
- Benazir Bhutto (54), a former prime minister of Pakistan, was assassinated by gunfire and a suicide bombing on 27 December 2007, in Rawalpindi, Pakistan. Mishandling of the crime scene and poor evidence-gathering hampered the investigation, and the assassins and their backers were never identified.
- Lane Bryant shooting – on 2 February 2008, a gunman trying to rob a Lane Bryant store in the Brookside Marketplace in Tinley Park, Illinois killed five women (a manager and four customers). The shooter has not been apprehended, although police do not consider it a "cold case" yet.
- Real estate agent Lindsay Buziak (24) was stabbed an undisclosed number of times while showing a house to an unknown couple in Saanich, British Columbia, Canada, on 2 February 2008. Buziak had expressed reservations to her boyfriend, as the couple had claimed to have been referred to her by a coworker who was unreachable at the time. He had waited outside in his car for part of the time, and was taken into custody along with a friend, but was later cleared. Buziak was stabbed from behind without any defensive wounds, and the couple had made the appointment with a disposable cell phone. The investigation is ongoing.
- Georgi Stoev (35), a former member of the Bulgaria mafia, and later a writer who wrote extensively on organized crime, was shot to death on the streets of Sofia on 7 April 2008. Nobody was ever charged in his murder.
- Michael Allen, better known as VL Mike (32), was an American rap artist from New Orleans, Louisiana. He was murdered in his hometown by persons unknown, on 20 April 2008. The murder remains unsolved.
- Tonderai Ndira (32–33), a Zimbabwean MDC–T activist, was abducted and later killed by a group of armed gunmen between 13 and 22 May 2008. While it has been proposed that he was the target of a government-backed death squad, his killers have never been identified.
- Aarushi Talwar (13) and Hemraj Banjade (45) were murdered on the night of 15–16 May 2008 at Aarushi's home in Noida, India. Aarushi's parents were first suspected and charged, but the charges were dropped, and their domestic servants became suspects. Then, her parents were again charged, and were convicted and sentenced to life imprisonment, but were exonerated after an appeal in the High Court. No other arrests have been made, and the murderer remains unknown.
- Fernando Martí (14) was kidnapped on 12 July 2008 and was found dead inside the trunk of an abandoned car in Mexico City on 1 August 2008. His murder remains unsolved.
- Soran Mama Hama (20–21) was a reporter for Livin magazine in Kirkuk, Iraq. He was shot by unidentified gunmen and died in Kirkuk, at approximately 9 p.m. on 22 July 2008, in the suburban neighborhood of Shorija. It is believed that he was the victim of corrupt police and government personnel, which he had previously reported on.
- Malalai Kakar (41), the highest-ranking woman in the Afghan police force, was shot and killed by an unknown assassin while leaving her Kandahar home for work on 28 September 2008. No suspects have been officially named, although it is believed that the Taliban may be connected to the crime.
- Miguel Angel Villagómez Valle (29) was a Mexican journalist, editor, and publisher who founded and operated the newspaper La Noticia de Michoacán from 2004 until his murder in La Unión, Guerrero, Mexico. On the night of 9 October 2008, he was kidnapped on his way home from work after he took two colleagues home. The state attorney said that minutes later, he was intercepted by at least two cars with armed individuals who abducted him. On the following day, police found his body at around 10 a.m. at the side of the road near a dump, about a kilometer away from the exit to the town of La Unión. His body was covered in bruises, and had six gunshot wounds to the back, and one gunshot to the head.
- Amy Yeary (18), whose body was discovered on 23 November 2008, in Ashford, Wisconsin, was originally unidentified, and referred to as the Fond du Lac County Jane Doe. The use of DNA and dental records in 2021 led to her identification. No arrests have been made.
- Andrew Cunningham (52) was stabbed to death and his genitals mutilated in his caravan in London Borough of Wandsworth on 10 December 2008. It is believed that Cunningham, a convicted sex offender, was the victim of a vigilante killing, and that his sex offender status led to witnesses refusing to reveal what they knew about the case.
- Francis Nyauri (30–31), also known as "Mong'are Mokua", was a Kenyan freelance journalist for the Weekly Citizen newspaper in Nyamira, Nyamira County, Kenya. He had published several articles about local police officials, exposing acts of corruption and malpractice, approximately two weeks before his dead body was found decapitated with hands bound on 29 January 2009.
- Matt Stewart (31) was a nurse and father of three who was beaten and shot to death inside his home on 9 June 2009 in Mooresville, North Carolina. His wife, Angel, claims the couple were attacked in their bed by an unknown intruder. Following the attack, Angel ran to a neighbor's house to call for help. In January 2010, Mooresville Police released a composite sketch of the suspect. Investigators briefly pursued the possible involvement of South Carolina spree killer Patrick Tracy Burris, only to later declare there to have been no connection between Burris and the unsolved murder of Matt Stewart. No arrests have been made.
- On 15 July 2009, human rights activist Natalya Estemirova (51) was abducted from her home in Grozny. Her assailants took her to the Republic of Ingushetia where she was shot repeatedly in the chest and head and left to die in a forest. No suspects were ever identified, although many of Estemirova's colleagues believed the Russian government had ordered her death.
- Lavelle Felton (29) was an American professional basketball player who was celebrating signing a new contract with a German team at a Milwaukee, Wisconsin nightclub, on 13 August 2009. After leaving and stopping at a gas station, he was fatally shot by an unknown gunman.
- Christian Poveda (41) was a Hispanic-French photojournalist and a film director, who was assassinated on 2 September 2009 in El Salvador, possibly by a member of a mara.
- José Arturo Vásquez Machado was governor of the Cabañas Department in the Republic of El Salvador from 1994 to 2003. During the night of 9 November 2009, Arturo Vasquez was taken to an emergency room in San Salvador, where he died from wounds that he sustained in an attack perpetrated by unknown individuals.
- Ivan Khutorskoy (26) was a RASH skinhead, nicknamed "Bonecrusher," who was a prominent member of the Russian anti-fascist movement. He was murdered in his home in a suburb of Moscow on 16 November 2009.
- José Luis Romero (44) was a Mexican radio journalist for Línea Directa Radio and Radio Sistema del Noroeste in Los Mochis, Sinaloa, Mexico; he was known for his reporting about drug trafficking. He disappeared on 30 December 2009, and had been missing for two weeks until his body was found, having been tortured and brutally murdered. Romero's murder, along with other Mexican journalists who have been killed during their job, was interpreted by CNN as intimidation toward journalists.
- Megan Poston, Michael Dillon, Eddrick Clark, and Donté Ward were shot and killed on their prom night. Despite an extensive investigation, no suspect has been identified, and the case remains unsolved.

== 2010s ==
- Mahmoud al-Mabhouh (52), a senior military commander of the organization Hamas, and cofounder of its military wing Izz ad-Din al-Qassam Brigades, was found dead in his Dubai hotel room on 19 January 2010. Initially, his death was thought to be from natural causes, and Hamas, in a public statement, attributed it to cancer. However, later investigation showed that he had been injected with suxamethonium chloride to paralyze him, and then suffocated with a pillow. The Dubai police circulated pictures of 20 guests and visitors believed to have been associated with the killing, who they suggested were operatives of Israel's foreign intelligence service, the Mossad. Many had entered the United Arab Emirates on forged passports from Western countries. The disclosures caused diplomatic tensions between those countries and Israel, but did not lead to any public arrests or identifications.
- Lorenzo González Cacho (8), of Dorado, Puerto Rico, was pronounced dead on arrival at a clinic his mother brought him to on 9 March 2010. She claimed his injuries had resulted from a fall from bed; this was contradicted by an autopsy, which revealed severe facial and head wounds, as well as some stabbing injuries. She and several other people in the house at the time have been publicly identified as suspects, but not charged.
- Pedro Alcantara de Souza was a Brazilian land reform activist operating in the state of Pará. He was killed in the town of Belém on 1 April 2010, shot in the head five times.
- Elisabeth Mandala (18) was a young American woman who was found dead in between April and May 2010 along with two men in a truck along a Mexican federal highway in Nuevo León, Mexico. The trio had been beaten and murdered, but the killers are not known.
- Eamon Dunne (34), who was nicknamed "The Don", was a major male Irish organised crime figure from Finglas, North Dublin, who on 23 April 2010 was murdered at a pub in Cabra, after being shot multiple times, while he was attending friend's birthday party. Whoever shot him fled the scene, so his murder remains unsolved.
- Scott Guy (31), a farmer from New Zealand, was shot dead at the gate of his family farm in Feilding in July 2010. Six months later, his brother-in-law, Ewen Macdonald, was charged with his murder, but was found not guilty. As a result, the murder remains unsolved.
- The body of Namibian schoolgirl Magdalena Stoffels (17) was found in a river near Windhoek on 27 July 2010; she had been raped, and then murdered. Police arrested a local man they found washing some clothing in a nearby portion of the river shortly afterward, and charged him with the crime due to scratches on his body, and what they believed were bloodstains on the clothing. A year later, he was released, as the forensic evidence did not provide any stronger link to the crime. The investigation is ongoing.
- Amber Tuccaro (20), a Canadian First Nations woman who was last seen alive on 18 August 2010, while hitchhiking to Edmonton with an unknown man. Her body was found in 2012 in nearby Leduc County.
- Gregorio Barradas Miravete (28) was a politician from Mexico who was a member of the National Action Party who was kidnapped in Isla, Veracruz. on 8 November 2010 and was then killed. His killer is not known.
- Marisela Escobedo Ortiz (51–52) was a Mexican social activist from Chihuahua City, who was killed on 16 December 2010 while protesting the murder of her daughter that occurred in 2008.
- Hailey Dunn (13), who disappeared from Colorado City, Texas, on 27 December 2010, was found dead in March 2013. Her murder remains unsolved.
- A worker at a landfill outside Wilmington, Delaware, spotted the body of John P. Wheeler III (66), founder of the Vietnam Veterans Memorial Fund, contract employee of Mitre Corp., and an official who had served in the Department of Defense under Republican administrations, in some waste being unloaded on 31 December 2010. He had been beaten to death sometime after being seen at an intersection downtown the preceding afternoon; witnesses who had seen him in various locations around Wilmington over the previous two days said he had appeared somewhat confused and disoriented, but sober, claiming at one point to have been robbed, but refused offers of help. He was reportedly involved in a feud with a neighbor and may have been involved in an attempted arson; no suspects have emerged.
- Peter Gibb (48), an Australian fugitive who died on the morning of 23 January 2011 at Frankston Hospital, from injuries caused by three unknown men who attacked him at his home in Seaford, Victoria. The case remains unsolved.
- Muzafar Bhutto (41), a Sindhi nationalist politician in Pakistan, was last seen alive on 24 February 2011. His body, with many gunshot wounds, was found near a Hyderabad bypass on 22 May 2012, fourteen months later. No suspects have been officially identified.
- Ronan Kerr (25), a constable with the Police Service of Northern Ireland, was killed by a car bomb on 2 April 2011 outside his home in Killyclogher. The attack was attributed to a dissident republican group. No-one has ever stood trial for the crime; one suspect was charged with offences related to the bombing, but the charges were withdrawn a week before trial.
- The Dupont de Ligonnès murders involved the murder of five members of the same family in Nantes, in the département of Loire-Atlantique in north-western France, followed by the disappearance of the father of the family. Agnès Dupont de Ligonnès and her four children were murdered in early April 2011. Their bodies were found on 21 April 2011 at their home in Nantes. The father, Xavier Dupont de Ligonnès, disappeared at the same time, and is considered the prime suspect in their murders. He has reportedly contacted the French media, but has not been captured.
- Phylicia Barnes (16) was an American girl who is thought to have been murdered in Baltimore, Maryland. She disappeared on 28 December 2010, and was found dead on 20 April 2011. The murder remains unsolved.
- José Cláudio Ribeiro da Silva (52), a Brazilian conservationist and environmentalist, and his wife Maria do Espírito Santo (51), campaigned against logging and clearcutting of trees in the Amazon rainforest. They were shot and killed in an ambush attack on 24 May 2011 at a settlement called Maçaranduba 2, which is located near their home in Nova Ipixuna, Pará. José Cláudio Ribeiro da Silva had been refused police protection by local authorities, according to reports by the Diário do Pará and The Guardian.
- Richard Oland (69), a Canadian businessman and former vice-president for Moosehead Brewery, was bludgeoned to death in his office in Saint John, New Brunswick on 7 July 2011. His son Dennis was convicted of the crime, but was given a new trial in 2019, and acquitted.
- On the afternoon of 12 September 2011, Brendan Mess, Erik Weissman and Raphael Teken were found with their throats cut almost to the point of decapitation in different rooms of Mess's Waltham, Massachusetts apartment. Their bodies were sprinkled with $5,000 in cash and seven pounds of marijuana, an amount having an even higher street value at the time, suggesting robbery had not been the motive. It was determined that the three had been killed the previous evening. After Tamerlan Tsarnaev was killed following the Boston Marathon bombing a year and a half later, which his brother Dzhokhar was later convicted of perpetrating, it was disclosed that he had been suspected of involvement in the Waltham murders, due in part to his acquaintanceship with one of the victims. Ibragim Todashev, another friend of Tsarnaev's who had been suspected of involvement, was killed when he reacted violently during an FBI interrogation shortly after the bombings. Police still suspect Dzhokhar, convicted for his role in the bombings, of being involved as well, but have not formally charged him.
- Nauman Habib (32) was a Pakistani cricketer who went missing on 9 October 2011 and was found dead just two days later after being murdered. Whoever killed him is unknown.
- Christopher Guarin (41), a Filipino journalist, radio show host, and a local tabloid publisher and editor-in-chief, murdered in General Santos, South Cotabato. Guarin was the 150th Filipino journalist to have been killed since the People Power Revolution. Guarin was attacked and killed on 5 January 2012 after receiving death threats.
- Wendy Albano (52) was an American businesswoman murdered in February 2012 in a hotel room in Thailand. Authorities in the U.S. got in touch with the U.S. State department, eventually leading to the arrest of a suspect hiding in India years later. The chief suspect was an Indian business associate who fled to India after her death. He has yet to be charged in court.
- Married Bangladeshi journalists Sagar Sarowar and Meherun Runi, both 27, were found stabbed to death in their Dhaka apartment on 11 February 2012. Their deaths, of all the many murders of journalists in the country, drew protests and public outrage both in Bangladesh and abroad. Both were working on stories at the time that could have led to violent reprisals. The government initially promised to have suspects in custody within days, but to date, no arrests have been made.
- Bashir Ahmed Qureshi (54), another Sindhi nationalist leader, suddenly collapsed during a dinner with members of his party on 7 April 2012 in Sakrand, Pakistan. He died in hospital early the next morning. A week later, pathologists announced that he had been poisoned with phosphorus and ruled his death a murder; no suspects have been identified.
- Regina Martínez Pérez (48), a Mexican journalist and veteran crime reporter for Proceso, a center-left Mexican news magazine known for its critical reporting of the social and political establishment, was murdered early in the morning of 28 April 2012 in her home in the Felipe Carrillo Puerto neighborhood in Xalapa, the capital of Veracruz. When police went to her home to investigate in response to a neighbor's call about her door being open all day, Martínez Pérez' corpse was found on the bathroom floor.
- Lorena Escalera (25), known professionally as "Lorena Xtravaganza", was an American transgender performer known for her impersonations of Beyoncé and Jennifer Lopez. She was found unconscious and unresponsive in her Bushwick apartment on 2 May 2012. Escalera's apartment was set on fire after she had been strangled and suffocated.
- Urooj Khan, an Indian immigrant who owned five condominiums and ran three dry-cleaning shops in Chicago, died suddenly in July 2012, a month after winning $424,000.00 in the Illinois state lottery. The cause of Khan's death was first ruled as natural, but his brother and nephew raised suspicions, prompting the authorities to test fluids taken from Khan's corpse before he was buried. The tests concluded that Khan had been poisoned with cyanide. In January 2013, authorities exhumed Khan's body to do a full autopsy, but the results yielded no clues. Khan's death was classified as a homicide, but investigators have been tight-lipped. Khan's family suspected his second wife and widow, Shabana Ansari, who swore that he fell ill before dying; as Khan died without making a will, Ansari stood to claim his dry-cleaning shops that were worth $1 million and his condominiums that were worth $250,000.00. Khan's brother petitioned a judge asking Citibank to release information about Khan's assets to ensure that Jasmeen, the victim's daughter from a previous marriage, received her share of the lottery winnings. Khan's widow and his daughter eventually settled in court and agreed not to sue each other for his death unless new evidence comes to light-Ansari got one third of her husband's winnings and his dry-cleaning shops while Jasmeen got the rest of her father's money and his condominiums. As of 2024, there have been no further updates regarding the death of Urooj Khan.
- Fareeda Kokikhel Afridi, a Pakistani feminist and women's rights activist, was shot to death by two motorcyclists on 5 July 2012, while en route to her workplace in Hayatabad.
- The person or people behind the Annecy shootings, in which an Iraqi-born British engineer, several of his family members, and a French cyclist were murdered at a campsite in the French Alps on 5 September 2012, have never been identified officially, and the case remains under investigation.
- Alfred Schakron (51) was a Belizean businessman and the ex-husband of People's United Party political hopeful Yolanda Schakron. He was murdered in broad daylight on 24 October 2012 outside a Belize City gym, leaving police mystified as to the motive of the crime, or the identity of the killers.
- Smurfette Jane Doe (15–17), a female teenage girl who was found murdered on 16 October 2012 in Houston, Texas. Her identity and killer are unknown.
- David Black (52), a prison officer from Cookstown, County Tyrone, was killed in a drive-by shooting on 1 November 2012 while driving to work between Portadown and Lurgan. A trial over the murder collapsed in 2018.
- Mohammed Shuwa (72) was a Nigerian Army Major General and the first General Officer Commanding of the Nigerian Army's 1st Division. Shuwa commanded the Nigerian Army's 1st Division during the Nigerian Civil War. He was murdered in his Maiduguri home on 2 November 2012 by suspected Boko Haram militants.
- The Kharkiv beheadings was a crime committed on 15 December 2012 in Ukraine, in which a judge and his family were beheaded with a machete.
- Keith Ratliff (32), producer of the popular YouTube gun-enthusiast channel FPSRussia, was found dead from a gunshot wound to the head in his custom gun shop in Carnesville, Georgia, on the evening of 3 January 2013, about 24 hours after he had last been seen alive. Police believe he knew his killer, as none of his guns were taken or used to kill him, and he would have only allowed an acquaintance to get close enough to him to do it. The investigation is continuing.
- In the early morning hours of 11 January 2013, Paris police forced their way into a local Kurdish information center, where they found the bodies of Kurdistan Workers' Party (PKK) members Sakine Cansız (55), Fidan Doğan (30) and Leyla Söylemez, a younger woman. They had last been seen in the office where they were found the previous afternoon. Nothing had been taken, all were shot execution style, and the killer or killers locked the door after leaving, suggesting that someone acquainted with at least one of the victims committed the crime with the intention of killing all three. The person who was captured by the police, and is said to have killed them, later died of cancer. As a result, the murder remains unsolved.
- Fausto Valdiviezo (53) was a senior Ecuadorian journalist and television presenter who was murdered on 11 April 2013. The investigation into his murder is looking at suspects.
- An explosion at a fertilizer factory in West, Texas, on 27 April 2013 killed fifteen people. After an investigation that took almost three years, the federal Bureau of Alcohol, Tobacco, Firearms and Explosives announced that the cause was an ammonium nitrate fire that had been deliberately set, although this finding has been disputed. No suspects have been named.
- Islam Bibi (38–39), a female Muslim who was the highest-ranking police officer in Afghanistan in the Helmand Province headquarters, and had also fought for feminism, and was among the first to do so. Bibi was assassinated on 4 July 2013 by unknown persons after she had received multiple death threats, and her murder remains unsolved.
- Otávio Jordão da Silva (20), a Brazilian amateur football referee, was lynched, quartered, and beheaded by football spectators, after he stabbed a player in a match he officiated on 30 June 2013.
- Daniel Pedreira Senna Pellegrine (20), better known by his stage name MC Daleste, was a Brazilian funk paulista singer, songwriter and rapper. Daleste was fatally shot in the abdomen on 7 July 2013 while performing during a free show in Campinas, São Paulo, before a crowd of four thousand people. He died later the same day in Paulínia's City Hospital.
- Dwayne Jones (16), a Jamaican teenager, was killed by a violent mob in Montego Bay on the evening of 21 July 2013, after he attended a dance party dressed in women's clothing. The incident attracted national and international media attention, and brought increased scrutiny to the status of LGBT rights in Jamaica.
- The Pesseghini family are five family members who were killed in São Paulo on 5 August 2013 by an unknown gunman whose identity is not currently known.
- Fernando Solijon (48), a Filipino radio journalist for DXLS, an affiliate of the Love Radio Network in Iligan, Lanao del Norte. Solijon was known for being analytical of alleged corruption and wrongdoing in the Philippines. Solijon was shot multiple times as he was getting into his car after drinking with friends. Solijon died on his way to the hospital on 29 August 2013.
- João Rodrigo Silva Santos (35) was a Brazilian footballer, who was murdered by suspected drug traffickers on 29 October 2013 in Rio de Janeiro.
- Two members of Greece's far-right Golden Dawn political party were shot and killed by passing motorcyclists outside the party's offices in the Athens suburb of Neo Irakleio on 1 November 2013. A leftist organization claimed that the attack was retaliation for the murder of an antifascist rapper several weeks earlier, for which another Golden Dawn member is facing charges. The investigation is continuing.
- On 5 November 2013, the Mexican police had stated that several mutilated bodies were found at a ranch known as La Borbolla, along the highway that connects Jiménez and Padilla, and that Carlos Ornelas Puga, a Catholic priest who is believed to have been kidnapped by gunmen in the Mexican state of Tamaulipas on 3 November 2013, may be among them. This has not been proven to be true, and their murder cases remain unsolved.
- On 30 January 2014, family members Maoye Sun (50), Mei Xie (49), Timothy Sun (9) and Titus Sun (7) were found dead from gunshots in their home in Cypress, Texas. Officials ruled all four deaths to be homicides, and estimated the time of death to be 24–25 January 2014. A window was broken and the back door was open. No weapons were found at the scene. Zhou Yangkang, a former Chinese Communist Party leader, reportedly confessed to ordering the hit in order to hide his illicit oil dealings, but the claim is disputed and not likely to be true. A co-worker of Maoye's, Feng Lu, was arrested in September 2022. Police believing the murders were committed because of a workplace dispute. Lu purchased a firearm two days before the murders and returned it, without a barrel, a week after. Lu's DNA was also found on Mei Xie's purse in the home. The investigation continues.
- Pedro Palma (47) was a Brazilian journalist, editor, and publisher for the Panorama Regional in Miguel Pereira, Rio de Janeiro, Brazil. Palma was killed by two unknown people on 13 February 2014.
- Benjamín Galván Gómez (41) was a Mexican businessman, PRI politician, and mayor of Nuevo Laredo, Tamaulipas between 2011 and 2013. Frequently threatened due to his anti-organized crime sentiment, Galván was abducted from a drugstore on 27 February 2014. His mutilated corpse was found the next day, and positively identified a month later. Several suspected Los Zetas members were arrested for his murder, but all were killed before they could go to trial.
- Reşat Amet (39) was a Crimean Tatar activist for ethnic Tatar causes, and a Crimean Tatar hero. On 3 March 2014, he was abducted by three unidentified men in military uniform from the "Crimean self-defense" detachments, who took him away. On 15 March 2014, Amet's body was found by police in a forest near the village of Zemlyanychne in Bilohirsk district, about 60 kilometers east of the Crimean capital.
- Rubylita Garcia (52) was a Filipino host for a local radio talk show on channel DWAD and a journalist for the daily tabloid Remate in Bacoor, Cavite. She reported on corruption in the Philippines. She was murdered on 6 April 2014 after being shot.
- On 6 May 2014, the headless body of Russell Dermond (88) was found slumped over a seat in his car in the garage of his house on Lake Oconee, in Putnam County, Georgia. The severely beaten body of his wife Shirley (87) was found 10 days later, weighted down in the lake. The couple had last been seen alive on 1 May 2014. Russell's head has never been found, and no suspects have ever been identified.
- Camille Lepage (26) was a French photojournalist who was killed during the conflict in the Central African Republic by persons unknown, on 12 May 2014. Her death was described as a "murder" by the French presidency, and it marked the first death of a Western journalist in the conflict.
- Tito Torbellino (33), whose real name was Tomás Eduardo Tovar Rascón, was an American songwriter and singer who was shot dead by an unknown person on 29 May 2014 at a restaurant in Ciudad Obregón, Mexico.
- Octavio Rojas Hernández was a Mexican reporter who was murdered at his home in San José Cosolapa, Oaxaca, Mexico, on 11 August 2014, after a young man came to Hernández's door to ask about buying the vehicle that was parked outside his home. Rojas had just arrived at his home following a social event in Palma Sola, Cosolapa, and was about to eat, but left the house to talk with the young man about the vehicle. The unidentified man shot Rojas four times: two times in the head, once in his abdomen, and once in his left arm. After hearing the gunshots, his wife ran outside to see what had happened, but the murderer had fled the area.
- On 28 September 2014, John and Joyce Sheridan were found dead in their Skillman, New Jersey, home. Firefighters found their bodies in the house's master bedroom after putting out a fire there. Both had suffered stab wounds which were found to have killed them; the case was initially believed by the Somerset County prosecutor's office to have been a murder-suicide. In 2022 guilty pleas in a similar murder, also combining a stabbed victim and a fire set to destroy evidence, elsewhere in the state led its Attorney General's office to reopen the case.
- The Chens, a Chinese family of four, were found slain in their Guilderland, New York, home on 8 October 2014, stabbed and beaten with hammers early that morning, the first quadruple homicide ever to occur in New York's Capital District. Links to gambling and the smuggling of immigrant restaurant workers from the Chinese province of Fujian to and within the U.S. have been suggested, as well as to two other unsolved killings of Chinese families in the U.S. in preceding years. The investigation is continuing.
- Alexander Bednov (45) was the leader of the pro-Russian Batman Rapid Response Group. He was assassinated in Luhansk on 1 January 2015, with conflicting reports on who was responsible for his murder.
- Alberto Nisman, an Argentine lawyer and prosecutor who specialized in international terrorism, was found dead in the early hours of 19 January 2015, a few days short of making an appearance before the congress to accuse Cristina Fernández de Kirchner. He was found shot in the head in his apartment in the Torre del Parque building, in the upscale Le Parc Puerto Madero development in the neighborhood of Puerto Madero in Buenos Aires.
- Rapper The Jacka (37), born Dominick Newton, was shot to death along an Oakland, California street on 2 February 2015. Police have not identified any suspects.
- Boris Nemtsov (55), a Russian physicist and liberal politician, was assassinated on 27 February 2015, beside his Ukrainian partner Anna Duritskaya, on a bridge near the Kremlin in Moscow, with four shots fired from the back. Though five men were found guilty of agreeing to kill Nemtsov for 15 million rubles, these men were hired to kill him, but were not the people who did kill him, so the case is unsolved.
- Chloé Ansel (9) was a French girl who was kidnapped on 15 April 2015 from Calais and was found dead less than just two hours later in the nearby woods. The prime suspect believed to have abducted and killed her later committed suicide in custody, so the case remains unsolved.
- Kenyan investigative journalist John Kituyi (63) was attacked and beaten fatally by two assailants on motorcycles, while walking home from work on 30 April 2015. A man was later arrested and charged with robbery after Kituyi's mobile phone SIM card was found in his possession, but no suspects have been identified in the murder.
- Gerard Davison (47), a commander in the Provisional IRA, was shot dead on the morning of 5 May 2015 on Welch Street in Belfast. No suspects have been named, although press reports speculate that he may have been killed by fellow Irish nationalists who had a grudge against him.
- Rubén Espinosa (32) was a Mexican self-taught photographer and journalist. He worked for AVC News agency and Proceso and Cuartoscuro magazines. He covered daily news and social protests. He documented several protests where individuals were assaulted. Espinosa was killed on 31 July 2015 in Narvarte, Mexico City, Mexico along with four women.
- Ebby Steppach (18) was an American woman who disappeared on 25 October 2015 from Little Rock, Arkansas, and was found dead on 14 May 2018. Steppach has been determined to have been murdered, and her killer is unknown.
- Metrojet Flight 9268, a Russian airliner bound for Saint Petersburg, exploded in midair over the Sinai Peninsula on 31 October 2015, killing all 224 people aboard. Investigators determined that a bomb had been placed aboard the plane before it took off from Sharm El Sheikh. Responsibility for the bombing has not been definitively established; Islamic State claimed responsibility and this claim was supported by Russian authorities, but an Egyptian court rejected this in 2020 and ruled that the bombing was not a terrorist attack.
- Giulio Regeni (28) was an Italian Cambridge University graduate who was disappeared on 25 January 2016, and was found murdered on 3 February 2016 in Egypt. Regeni was a PhD student at Girton College, Cambridge, researching Egypt's independent trade unions, and a former employee of the international consulting firm Oxford Analytica. The killer is unknown.
- David Byrne, an Irish criminal who was shot dead at the Regency Hotel in Whitehall, Dublin on 5 February 2016. His killer has never been found.
- Missy Bevers (45) was an American fitness instructor who was found dead at the Creekside Church of Christ in Midlothian, Texas on 18 April 2016. Surveillance videos from inside the church released by police show an unknown person walking around in police tactical gear prior to her murder. Police believe the person in the video is Bevers's murderer but the case remains unsolved.
- Matthew Kitandwe (18) was stabbed to death outside his home in Battersea, London on 21 June 2016. No-one has ever been charged with the crime.
- Eunice Olawale (41) was a Nigerian Christian female preacher who was murdered by suspected Muslim extremists in the early hours of 9 July 2016, while evangelizing in the Federal capital city of Abuja.
- Seth Rich (27), a Democratic National Committee (DNC) staffer, was found with two gunshot wounds in his back shortly before dawn on 10 July 2016, near his home in the Bloomingdale neighborhood of Washington, D.C.. He never regained consciousness, and died later in the hospital. Police have attributed his death to a botched robbery attempt; his wristwatch band was torn, but nothing else was taken from him, and there were signs of a struggle. Conspiracy theorists have claimed he was murdered for leaking DNC emails to WikiLeaks.
- Pavel Sheremet (44) was a Belarusian-born Russian and Ukrainian journalist who was imprisoned by the government of Belarus in 1997, sparking an international incident between Belarus and Russia. Sheremet died in Kyiv on 20 July 2016 in a car explosion. The Ukraine Prosecutor's Office have said the explosion was caused by a bomb, and labelled the death of Sheremet as an unsolved murder.
- Darren Seals (29), an American racial justice activist and hip-hop musician known for his role in the 2014 Ferguson demonstrations, was murdered in Riverview on 6 September 2016. He was shot dead in the early hours of the morning before his body was left in a burning car. An investigation by The Daily Beast revealed that at least five other residents of St. Louis County had died under similar circumstances in the preceding years, but a connection has never been proven.
- Sydney Land (21) and Nehemiah Kauffman (20) were found dead due to gunshot wounds on 27 October 2016 in Land's apartment in Las Vegas, Nevada. While the Las Vegas Metropolitan Police Department initially announced that they had no motive and no suspects, they later declared that Shane "Suga" Valentine, a local man suspected of sex trafficking who had previously shot bullets into Kauffman's mothers home, was a person of interest, although he was never charged. As of January 2023, no arrests have been made in the case.
- Soe Moe Tun (34–35), a Burmese investigative journalist for the Daily Eleven in Monywa, Sagaing Region found murdered on 13 December 2016. He was best known for his investigative reporting about sensitive issues, such as illegal logging, the Letpadaung Copper Mine project, and illegal karaoke lounges in his local area.
- Denis Voronenkov (45) was a Russian politician who served as a member of the State Duma from 2011 to 2016. He was a member of the Unity party from 2000 to 2003, and the Communist Party of the Russian Federation from 2011 to 2016. Voronenkov was shot dead in Kyiv as he left the Premier Palace hotel on 23 March 2017.
- Amílcar Henríquez (33) was a Panamanian footballer. On 15 April 2017, Henríquez was killed in his hometown of Colón in a drive-by shooting. He was shot while leaving his house, and two other people were also injured in the incident.
- On 18 April 2017, Professor of Molecular Genetics Tahira Malik was found stabbed to death in her house in the residential colony of the University of the Punjab in Lahore, Pakistan. She was an Ahmadi, a member of a minority Islamic movement, severely persecuted in Pakistan for its beliefs. A sectarian motive for the killing was suspected; the perpetrator remains unknown.
- Maksym Shapoval (38) was an officer in the Ukrainian military, and head of the special forces of the Chief Intelligence Directorate. Shapoval had just recently returned from the conflict zone in eastern Ukraine, on 27 June 2017, when he was assassinated in a car bomb attack in central Kyiv.
- Houssenaly Zahid Raza was an Honorary Malaysian Consul in Madagascar who was assassinated in Antananarivo on 24 August 2017. His murder is suspected to be linked to the disappearance of Malaysia Airlines Flight 370. Raza had been tasked with returning pieces of debris suspected to be from Flight 370 that had been washed up on Madagascan shores to Malaysia. Other people involved in the investigation of MH370 have received death threats as well.
- On 15 December 2017, the bodies of Canadian pharmaceutical magnate Barry Sherman (75), one of the country's richest men, and his wife Honey (70), were found hanging from belts, their hands tied, seated on the deck of their indoor swimming pool at their home in the Toronto suburb of North York. A month later the police, who had first explored a murder–suicide theory, confirmed earlier unofficial reports that the Shermans' deaths were, in fact, homicides. The investigation was hampered by legal resistance to search warrants for evidence at Sherman's notoriously litigious corporation, Apotex; as of April 2019, police said that they had a working theory of the crime, but have not publicly identified any suspects; their investigation is continuing.
- Iryna Nozdrovska (38) was a Ukrainian lawyer, who was reported missing on 29 December 2017. Her body was found in a river outside of Kyiv on 1 January 2018, and a murder investigation was opened. An autopsy revealed multiple stab wounds in her neck.
- Oliver Ivanović (64) was a Kosovo Serb politician who served as the State Secretary of the Ministry for Kosovo and Metohija from 2008 to 2012, and was also a member of the Coordination Center for Kosovo and Metohija from 2001 to 2008. He was assassinated by unknown perpetrators on 16 January 2018 in North Mitrovica.
- The 2018 Bulawayo bombing happened after a grenade exploded in Bulawayo, Zimbabwe at the White City Stadium on 23 June 2018. The explosion killed two people, and left forty-seven people injured. The perpetrators behind this are unknown.
- Brian Egg (65), a resident of San Francisco, was found dismembered inside a fish tank in his home in August 2018. Two men, Lance Silva (39) and Robert McCaffrey (52), were arrested as persons of interest and initially charged with homicide and related offenses, but the charges were later dropped, and neither has been convicted. As a result, the murder remains unsolved.
- Edmundo Rada, a Venezuelan councilman and opposition politician, was reported missing on 16 October 2019. He was found dead the following day on the side of the road out of Petare, Caracas, burned and with two coup de grâce shots in the back of his neck.
- Kevin Fret (24), a Puerto Rican rapper, and the first openly gay male Latin trap artist, was shot to death by an unidentified gunman on 10 January 2019 in Río Piedras, Puerto Rico. The assailant has not been located.
- Lyra McKee (29), a Northern Irish journalist, was shot dead on 18 April 2019 while observing rioting in Creggan, Derry. The New IRA claimed responsibility, saying that the shooter had not been intending to hit McKee. No-one was ever charged with firing the fatal shot, but three men were charged with aiding and abetting McKee's murder; they were acquitted in 2026. One man was found guilty in 2022 of possessing the murder weapon, but was not charged with any crime directly related to the murder.
- Telésforo Santiago Enríquez was a Mexican radio journalist, and professor of indigenous education in Oaxaca, Mexico who was ambushed and shot dead on 2 May 2019. His dead body was found in a vehicle that afternoon. Authorities reported that he had been driving in the neighborhood of Ampliación Tres Cruces when he was ambushed and killed.
- Marc Batchelor (49), a South African professional footballer, was shot to death outside his home in Olivedale on 15 July 2019. His killer is unknown.

== 2020s ==
- Marc Angelucci (52) was an American attorney, prominent men's rights activist, and the vice-president of the National Coalition for Men. He was fatally shot at his Cedarpines Park, California home on 11 July 2020. A possible suspect, Roy Den Hollander, also active in the men's rights community, committed suicide a week later after killing New Jersey federal judge Esther Salas' son during an attack on her house; he had differences with Angelucci that led to his expulsion from the organization. The murder remains unsolved.
- Brendin Horner (21) was killed on 1 October 2020 near the DeRots farm outside Paul Roux, South Africa. He was found tied to a metal post and covered in injuries which indicated that he had been tortured and dragged across the ground. His cause of death was strangulation. Two suspects were charged with the crime, but they were acquitted in November 2021.
- Four dead male youths (13–17), who had gone missing earlier in the month of March, were later discovered on 21 March 2021, after a shepherd's dog picked up their scent in the Bannu District, Khyber Pakhtunkhwa, Pakistan. It was revealed that the teenagers, whose identities later became known, had been badly tortured, and their killers are unknown. The cases have been named the "Janikhel incident" by media.
- Masten Wanjala (20) was a Kenyan fugitive and self-confessed serial killer. He escaped from police custody in October 2021 and returned to his family's hometown of Mukhweya in Bungoma County, where he was beaten and strangled to death on 15 October by a group of locals. No charges were brought against anyone involved in Wanjala's murder.
- Oluwabamise Ayanwole (21–22) was a Nigerian woman who was kidnapped in Lagos, Nigeria on 26 February 2022 after boarding a BRT. Nine days later she was found dead after being murdered in Lagos Island, near to the Carter Bridge. Her killer is not currently known.
- Two teenage boys were killed in a mass shooting on 17 April 2022, at an Airbnb party in Pittsburgh. As of February 2023, no one has been arrested or charged for the murders.
- Darya Dugina (29), a Russian journalist and daughter of political theorist Aleksandr Dugin, was killed in a bombing in Moscow Oblast on 20 August 2022. Russian authorities stated that their prime suspect was a Ukrainian named Vovk Natalia Pavlovna, who had fled to Estonia in the aftermath of the killing. Ilya Ponomarev claimed that a possibly fictitious group known as the National Republican Army was responsible. Others have suggested that the murder was a false flag attack by Russian security forces, or a failed attempt to assassinate Dugina's father.
- Shanquella Robinson (25), an American woman who on 29 October 2022 was murdered by persons unknown while she was in Cabo San Lucas, Mexico vacationing.
- Pedro Rodrigues Filho (68), Brazilian vigilante serial killer and YouTuber, was killed in a drive-by shooting on 5 March 2023 in Mogi das Cruzes. No suspects were identified.
- Oleg Khorzhan (47), an opposition leader in the unrecognised state of Transnistria, was killed at his home on 17 July 2023. Moldovan authorities stated that Khorzhan's body showed "signs of violent death" and opened a murder investigation.
- Michalis Katsouris (29) was a Greek man who was murdered during a football riot on 7 August 2023 in Nea Filadelfia, Greece. The killer has not yet been identified, but charges have been brought against over a hundred suspects.
- Samantha Woll (40), the president of Isaac Agree Downtown Synagogue, died after being repeatedly stabbed in her home on 21 October 2023. Detroit police identified a suspect, Michael Jackson-Bolanos, but the charges against him were dropped after a lengthy trial which ended in a hung jury due to the defense presenting an alternate suspect.
- Jacques Freitag (42), a high jumper from South Africa, went missing on 1 July 2024 from Pretoria West, Pretoria, Gauteng, and was found dead two weeks later. Two suspects have been charged with murder and criminal conspiracy and are awaiting trial.

== See also ==
- List of unsolved murders (before 1900)
- List of unsolved murders (1900–1979)
- List of unsolved murders (1980–1999)
