= Murder of Adnan Patrawala =

2007 Indian murder case

Adnan Patrawala
- Born: 21 September 1990; Mumbai
- Disappeared: August 18, 2007 (aged 16); Inorbit Mall, Malad, Mumbai
- Died: 19 August 2007 (aged 16); Palm Beach road, Navi Mumbai
- Cause of death: Homicide
- Body discovered: Palm Beach road, Navi Mumbai
- Citizenship: India
- Parent: Aslam Patrawala (father)

Adnan Patrawala was the teenage son of a businessperson from Mumbai, India. On 18 August 2007, Adnan was kidnapped for ₹2 crore (US$210,000) ransom. He was murdered the next day when news of the kidnapping broke on national TV and print media.

== Accused ==
Three were arrested days after the murder; Sujith Nair, 28, and Ayush Bhatt, 18 and Khimesh Ambavat, 17. Rajeev Dharaiya and Amit Kausha were also later arrested and charged with murder.

Arrests were made after police found communications between the accused and Patrawala on a social media site. During interrogations one of the accused led investigators to an area where Patrawala's body was found, and later an area his clothes were found.

== Trial and verdict ==
On 30 January 2012, Mumbai sessions court acquitted four of the five accused. The prosecution failed to prove its case. Aslam Patrawala (father) said that he would appeal in a higher court. Being a juvenile, the fifth accused was tried by the Juvenile Justice Board.

Despite evidence pointing to the accused's guilt police failings and issues with Chain of custody it was found to be invalid. With the court arguing what remained was not enough to convict.

== See also ==
- List of kidnappings
- List of solved missing person cases (post-2000)
- List of unsolved murders (2000–present)
- Murder of Snehal Gaware
