= Enrique Salinas =

Mexican murder victim (1952–2004)

- Born: Enrique Eduardo Guillermo Salinas de Gortari; November 15, 1952
- Died: December 6, 2004 (aged 52) municipality of Huixquilucan, Estado de México, on the outskirts of Mexico City
- Cause of death: murder by asphyxiation

Enrique Eduardo Guillermo Salinas de Gortari (November 15, 1952 – December 6, 2004) was the third of four brothers of former president of Mexico Carlos Salinas.

== Death ==
On December 6, 2004 his corpse was found, with a plastic bag placed over his head, inside a Volkswagen Passat. The vehicle was abandoned in the upmarket municipality of Huixquilucan, Estado de México, on the outskirts of Mexico City. The authorities (PGJEM) gave asphyxiation as the cause of death.

== Background ==
Unlike his brothers ex-president Carlos and convicted felon Raúl, Enrique had eschewed the world of politics in favour of the business sector.

Salinas' widow and kids reside in Lausanne, Switzerland.

== See also ==
- List of unsolved murders (2000–present)
