= Francis Nyauri =

Kenyan freelance journalist

Francis Kainda Nyaruri
- Born: ca. 1978; Kenya
- Disappeared: 15 January 2009 (aged 30–31); Nyamira, Kenya
- Status: Found killed
- Cause of death: Decapitation
- Body discovered: 29 January 2009; Kisii, Kodera Forests, Kenya
- Other names: Mong'are Mokua
- Occupation: Journalist
- Years active: 2004–2009
- Employer: Weekly Citizen
- Organization(s): The African Charter on Human and Peoples Rights
- Known for: Writing about corruption in high rank officials
- Spouse: Josephine Kwamboka
- Parent: Peter Nyaruri

Francis Kainda Nyaruri, also known as Mong'are Mokua (ca. 1978 – 29 January 2009), a Kenyan freelance journalist for the Weekly Citizen newspaper in Nyamira, Nyamira County, Kenya, had published several articles about local police officials exposing acts of corruption and malpractice approximately two weeks before his dead body was found decapitated with hands bound.

== Personal life ==
Thirty-one year old Francis Nyaruri is survived by his wife Josephine Kwamboka who identified him at Kisii Hospital on 29 January 2009. Kwamboka stated her husband had left the house earlier to travel to Kisii to buy construction materials he was in dire need of. His wife then informed reporters the last time she had talked with Francis was around 11 am. Friends and family had stated that about a month prior to Nyaruri's disappearance he had confided in them about recent death threats he was receiving in regards to his latest articles revealing police malpractice.

== Career ==
Francis Nyaruri was a freelance journalist at a private newspaper the Weekly Citizen. Nyaruri wrote under the pen name Mong'are Mokua since most of his articles told stories of corruption involving police and municipal official in Nyamira. This made him an enemy to many officials in his local area, but Nyaruri never feared which sometimes caused him to act without precautions.

== Disappearance and death ==
Mentioned locations, such as Nyanza Province, in Kenya in relation to Nairobi.

Kenyan police say Nyaruri had gone missing within two days of when the threats had been received. When family members reported Nyaruri as a missing person they noticed the police officials seemed to be very reluctant to help and almost seemed uncooperative suggesting he had failed to come home due to an alleged affair with a woman from a neighbouring town and that the family should wait a couple days or even a week before calling the police. About two weeks later on 29 January 2009, Nyaruri's body was found on the outskirts of the Kodera Forest in western Kenya. When the corpse had been found Nyaruri had been obviously decapitated and his hands were also found bound behind his back leaving him powerless.

== Context ==
Around the time of Nyaruri's death, his last article had just been released exposing police officials of corruption in construction facilities in Nyamira and neighbouring cities and towns. Nyaruri was very familiar with articles on corruption as this was not his first article causing questions to be raised about the integrity of police officials across the nation. A friend to Nyaruri, Sam Owida stated that Francis had been incautious in the past stating he would rush off to a story without telling anyone. Nyaruri's last article stating high-ranking officials were conspiring to defraud the public of millions of shilling through a police housing project.

Nyaruri was known for well he dealt with intimidation and which made reporting on issues of corruption involving government officials a bit easier. In 2008, Francis took on a national police officer Lawrence Njoroge Mwara accusing the officer of using the police vehicles to ship prostitutes and escorts across the country. Peter Nyaruri, Nyaruri's father admits that after this article his son had been threatened multiple times forcing him to go into hiding for several weeks. In recent articles, Nyaruri is seen accusing Mwara, the same officer from his 2008 articles of corruption and an extortion racket on construction projects. Even though Nyaruri had written his latest article under his pen name threats were allegedly being made almost immediately following.

After many investigations that included an overview of law documents and interviews with people directly intertwined with the case, evidence was found showing that high-ranked officials participated in an enormous effort to obstruct the investigation of Nyaruri's murder. Attorney General Amos Wako states "There is a strong suspicion that police officers could have executed the deceased." Many officials believe that members of a local municipal gang sungusungu were involved. They originated as a community security task force but with time, "sungusungu" quickly became criminal and murderous.

There was a Kenyan journalist Sam Owida, whose reports had helped expose and mostly publicise Nyaruri's case and his unsolved murder started to receive threatening phone calls and the caller explained he would share the same fate as Nyaruri if he kept reporting. Owida was also one of the first people to uncover Nyaruri's body in the Kodera Forest. The Committee to Protect Journalists(CPJ) provided Owida with protection after Owida explained that the caller claimed to be part of the local militia sungusungu and after confirming Owida was the reporter said they were "on to him". These phone calls forced Sam Owida to go into hiding for several weeks.

== Impact ==
Nyaruri was one of 54 journalists murdered in 2009, according to the Committee to Protect Journalists.

== Reactions ==
Reporters Without Borders said it was shocked by the murder of Nyaruri, found dumped in the forests. "We would like above all to express our deep sympathy to the victim's family," Reporters Without Borders said. RSF urged the authorities, including the police chief Larry Kieng, to establish the motive behind the murder and to bring those responsible to justice.

Koïchiro Matsuura, director-general of UNESCO, said, "I condemn the murder of Francis Nyaruri. I trust that this crime will be investigated and that its culprits will be brought to trial, not just for the sake of Francis Nyaruri but the sake of democracy and good governance. Journalists like him carry out important, albeit controversial, work that contributes to debate and democracy."

On 3 March 2009, Joel Simon, executive director of the Committee to Protect Journalists wrote to the President of the Republic of Kenya stating his organisation's concern over the lack of progress in Nyaruri's police investigation. In the letter, Simon said, representatives from "Nyamira's local government may be involved with Francis Nyaruri's murder and he tries asking for permission from the parliament to put together a private group to carry on with the investigation due to the close nature of the police officers on the force. Local journalists in Kenya say Kenya's once vibrant media now often practices self-censorship, as many journalists refrain from reporting on violent attacks for fear of deadly reprisals." Journalists also expressed that they feel as if journalists should be able to do their job right and well without the fear of being attacked or viciously threatened.

== See also ==
- Human rights in Kenya
- List of solved missing person cases (2000s)
- List of unsolved murders (2000–present)
