= José Arturo Vásquez Machado =

Salvadoran politician (died 2009)

José Arturo Vásquez Machado was governor of Cabañas department in the Republic of El Salvador from 1994–2003.

== Background ==
He was elected to the post in 1994 and held that position until 2003 when he was succeeded by Óscar Menjívar.

During his tenure as governor, Arturo Vasquez served under the administrations of president's Armando Calderón Sol and Francisco Flores. After serving as governor, he dedicated his time to his family and community as an active citizen in the city of Sensuntepeque.

On 9 November 2009, he was taken to an emergency room in San Salvador where he died from wounds that he sustained in an attack perpetrated by unknown individuals. On the morning of 12 November 2009, the Legislative Assembly of El Salvador held a moment of silence to honor the former governor.

== See also ==
- List of unsolved murders (2000–present)
