= Pedro Alcantara de Souza =

Brazilian land reform activist

- Died: 1 April 2010; Belém
- Cause of death: Gunshot
- Occupation: Activist

Pedro Alcantara de Souza (died 1 April 2010) was a Brazilian land reform activist operating in the state of Pará. He was shot dead on April 1, 2010. Souza was a farmers' union president, and city councilor of Redenção. In 2008, 20 killings were related to land issues in the Amazon.

== Death and aftermath ==
De Souza was shot in the head five times by two men on motorcycles while he was riding his bicycle on the outskirts of the town of Belém. The assassination occurred shortly after the trial of a man accused of masterminding the killing of another rain forest activist in 2005, Dorothy Stang. She was an American nun shot and killed in 2005. Watchdog groups say that conflicts between powerful ranchers and poor farmers over land rights have led to 1,200 murders across Brazil in the last 20 years.

== See also ==
- List of unsolved murders (2000–present)
