= Pedro Palma =

Brazilian journalist, editor and publisher

- Born: c. 1967; Rio de Janeiro, Brazil
- Died: 13 February 2014; Miguel Pereira, Rio de Janeiro, Brazil
- Cause of death: Murder by gunfire
- Occupations: Journalist, editor and publisher
- Years active: 1994–2014 (20 years)
- Employer: Panorama Regional
- Children: 1

Pedro Palma (c. 1967 – 13 February 2014) was a Brazilian journalist, editor and publisher for the Panorama Regional in Miguel Pereira, Rio de Janeiro, Brazil. Palma was known for uncovering alleged corruption within the local government, and he had received death threats before his assassination.

== Personal life ==
Pedro Palma was born in Rio de Janeiro, he lived until he was 47-years old. His funeral was held at the Miguel Pereira Atlético Clube.

== Career ==
Pedro Palma was the founder, publisher and director of Panorama Regional since 15 May 1994. It was a local newspaper that circulated in several nearby municipalities. It was distributed in the region around Miguel Pereira, such as Barra do Piraí and Vassouras The newspaper frequently exposed alleged irregularities in local administrations. Five months prior to his death, Palma was using the Panorama Regional to report cases of corruption, embezzlement and lack of public money transfers, mainly involving the mayor Claudio Valente and the first lady and Social Development secretary, Kathy Kozlowski.

== Death ==
Miguel Pereira, Brazil is shown relative to the capital Brasília.

Pedro Palma was gunned down by two men outside of his home on Rua Dona Carola around 8 p.m. on 13 February 2014 in the Governador Portela district, Miguel Pereira, Brazil. Two unknown individuals wearing helmets shot him at least three times from a motorcycle, which was recorded by security cameras. According to the military police, Palma died instantly. Palma's body was referred to the Instituto Médico-Legal de Barra do Piraí. Palma's daughter witnessed the murder.

A suspect from Rio de Janeiro was arrested in the case.

== Context ==
According to Reporters Without Borders in 2013, Brazil was declared the deadliest country for press workers on the American continent. Natalia Mazotte quoted the minister of justice Jose Eduardo Cardozo, stating that in 2013 there were 175 cases of violence against press workers.

According to the Committee to Protect Journalists, 31 other journalists were murdered in direct reprisal for their work. Brazil is ranked the seventh country with the highest journalist murders, and the deadliest country in Latin America for journalists in 2013.

== Impact ==
A friend of Palma told O Globo newspaper that Palma had been receiving death threats for many weeks but was not taking them seriously. Palma had been denouncing wrongdoing in the office of the mayor Miguel Pereira, a city located 62 miles from the state capital, and the city where Palma was murdered. The Committee to Protect Journalists lists his murder as confirmed that he was killed as a result of his journalism.

== Reactions ==
Irina Bokova, director-general of UNESCO, said, "I am shocked at the killing of Pedro Palma. The toll levied on media workers is tragic and unacceptable, and I call on the authorities to ensure that each of these cases is investigated thoroughly and brought to justice. Freedom of expression cannot thrive under the threat of guns."

"These murders are sadly indicative of the dangers to which the media are exposed in Brazil. Five journalists were murdered in 2013 and none of these cases has so far been solved. We fear that more cases will go unpunished in Brazil, which one was one Latin America's worst performers in the 2014 Reporters Without Borders press freedom index – ranked 111th out of 180 countries."

Committee to Protect Journalist's senior program coordinator for the Americas, Carlos Lauría, said, "Brazilian authorities must fully investigate the murder of Pedro Palma, determine the motive and bring those responsible to justice."

A statement released by the Brazilian Association of Investigative Journalism said, "Everything points to the criminals wanting to stop Pedro Palma's journalistic work – a flagrant attack against freedom of the press and an attack on the residents' right to information. Abraji hopes that the perpetrators will be identified and prosecuted. Impunity in cases like these can provide incentive for new attacks against the press and its workers."

"It is very sad when I receive such news, because the journalist's weapon is a pen that prevents him to defend himself. The journalist who speaks the truth and ends up brutally murdered," said JC Moreira, president of the Union of Professional Journalists of Sur Fluminense.

== See also ==
- Human rights in Brazil
- List of unsolved murders (2000–present)
