= Soran Mama Hama =

Kurdish Journalist

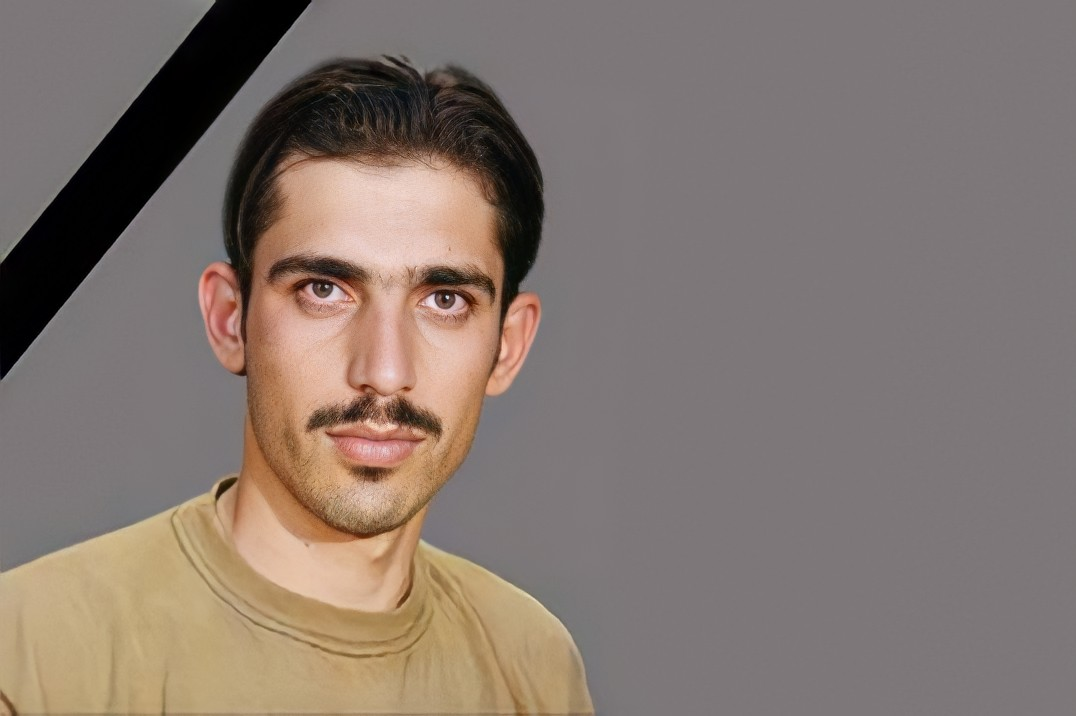
- Photo of Hama
- Born: 1987; Kirkuk, Ba'athist Iraq
- Died: July 21, 2008 (aged 20–21); Shorija, Kirkuk, Iraq
- Cause of death: Gunshot wound
- Occupation: Journalist

Soran Mama Hama (Kurdish: سۆران مامە حەمە; Arabic: سوران مامه حمه; 1987 – July 21, 2008) was an Iraqi journalist. He worked for the Lvin magazine in Kirkuk, Iraq, and was gunned down by unidentified gunmen in Kirkuk at approximately 9 p.m. on July 21, 2008, in the suburban Kirkuk neighborhood of Shorija. Hama's death remains unsolved. It is believed that he was the victim of corrupt police and government personnel, which he had previously reported on.

== Career ==
Hama’s last story in Lvin Magazine was titled, ‘Prostitutes invade Kirkuk.' Hama said that he had the names of police brigadiers, many lieutenants, colonels, and many police and security officers involved in and covering up a prostitution network in Kirkuk.

Hama had worked at Lvin for three years.

== Personal ==
Hama was born in Kirkuk on Rashid Awa Street. In Kirkuk, he studied at primary and secondary school. When he died, he was attending the Fine Arts Institution of Kirkuk where he was senior in the Music department.

== Death ==
The Kurdistan Journalists Syndicate (KJS) said Mama Hama had received a threatening message from an unidentified person on May 15.

Hama was shot and died in front of his home in Kirkuk.

In the mobile phone Hama was using, there were messages discovered to be from a PUK politician who had threatened him with death prior to the assassination. When the politician was asked to attend a court hearing he threatened the Judge by driving to court with an escort of over 100 vehicles full of security forces who would even shoot the judge if they were ordered to do so.

== Impact ==
Immediately after Hama's death, Kirkuk Police Brigadier Jamal Tahir told the Committee to Protect Journalists (CPJ) that the department was investigating. He said it was a "serious situation" and would get "special attention."

As of September 30, 2021, Hama's murder remained unsolved.

Partially in response to the lack of investigation into Hama's murder, thousands of Kurdish young people and students protested for 60-straight days to "address corruption and nepotism in Kurdistan, conduct reform in the political system, stop wasting natural resources, stop using the Kurdish military and security forces to kill civilians. The people have also called on the Kurdish government to stop suppressing and imprisoning journalists and independent writers." Their protests concluded on April 18, 2011, when security forces jailed and injured them.

== Reactions ==
Lvin journalists issued a statement on July 21, 2008, holding KRG officials accountable for Hama's death. Ahmed Mira, editor-in-chief of Lvin Magazine, expressed a desire that Kurdish parties be held responsible for Hama’s death because most security and police in the region are Kurdish. Mira said, "Kurdish parties in Kirkuk should be held accountable first, because no investigation has been done yet."

Kurdish writer Mariwan Wriya Qanie’s said, "Killing this young Kirkuki was a starting point to a world where nothing is normal anymore."

Shwan Muhamad, editor-in-chief of Awene newspaper said, “A dirty hand took this young Kirkuki. Soran’s murder was the beginning of a wave which has lasted still, and no one knows about its future.

"Where’s the result of investigation committees of Kurdish authority?"

Muhamad commented that the killing could be a starting point for those who want the Kurdish Regional Government (KRG) to return to tyranny saying, “Those who are behind committing this act don’t understand democratic values and see returning KRG to tyranny as normal.”

== See also ==
- List of unsolved murders (2000–present)
