= Iryna Nozdrovska =

Ukrainian Lawyer

- Born: January 27, 1979
- Disappeared: December 29, 2017; Vyshhorod Raion, Ukraine
- Died: December 29, 2017 (age 38)
- Cause of death: murder by stabbing
- Body discovered: January 1, 2018 in a river outside of Kyiv
- Occupation: lawyer
- Known for: being murdered
- Children: 1

Iryna Nozdrovska (January 27, 1979, Demydiv, Kyiv Oblast, URSR – c. December 29, 2017, Vyshhorod Raion, Ukraine) was a Ukrainian lawyer. In 2015 her sister was killed by a car driven by Dmitry Rossoshansky, the nephew of a Kyiv judge. Nozdrovska worked on bringing Rossoshansky to justice, and in May 2017 he was jailed for seven years.

Nozdrovska was reported missing on December 29, 2017. Her body was found in a river outside Kyiv on January 1, 2018, and a murder investigation was opened. An autopsy revealed multiple stab wounds in her neck.

== Death of sister ==
In 2015 Nozdrovska's sister was struck and killed by Dmitry Rossoshansky, the nephew of a Kyiv judge. In May 2017 Rossoshansky was jailed for seven years. Nozdrovska's lawyer, Vitaly Matselyuk said the high-profile nature of this case forced the Kyiv authorities to act. "Without the media, it may have gone nowhere," he said. Rossoshansky's appeal was rejected on December 27, 2017. Two days later, on December 29, Nozdrovska disappeared.

== See also ==
- List of solved missing person cases (post-2000)
- List of unsolved murders (2000–present)
