= Miodrag Stojanović =

Serbian martial artist

- Born: 24 October 1950; Bar, Montenegro, PR Montenegro, FPR Yugoslavia
- Died: 18 February 2001 (aged 50); Belgrade, Serbia, FR Yugoslavia
- Other names: Gidra
- Nationality: Yugoslavian
- Height: 1.69 m (5 ft 6 1/2 in)

Miodrag "Gidra" Stojanović (Serbian Cyrillic: Миодраг Гидра Стојановић; 24 October 1950 – 18 February 2001) was a Montenegrin Serb boxer, kickboxer and mixed martial arts (MMA) fighter. He achieved a Guinness World Record with the highest number of abdominal push-ups, doing fifty in ten seconds.

== Biography ==
Stojanović began his career as the "Strongest Yugoslav" as he was then known when he arrived in Belgrade for his post-secondary education. He graduated from the University of Belgrade Faculty of Economics.

In 1993, he moved to Los Angeles where he began a short film career. In the United States, he trained with Arnold Schwarzenegger and Magic Johnson. He wrote the screenplay and played the main role in the 1994 film Born to Be a Warrior which was dubbed the first Serbian action film.

Upon returning to Yugoslavia, he dedicated himself to introducing a new type of martial arts known as mixed martial arts to the Yugoslav public. At this time, newspapers began printing rumours that Stojanović had ties with the Belgrade underground.

== Death and legacy ==
Stojanović was assassinated on 18 February 2001 in broad daylight as he was entering his Audi A4 at the tennis courts of the Partizan Stadium. Stojanović was shot with a bullet to the neck while the other bullets hit his chest. The perpetrator was never found. Stojanović was survived by his three children: two sons and a daughter.

A memorial tournament named after Stojanović takes place annually.

== See also ==
- List of unsolved murders (2000–present)
