= Killing of Abraham Grünbaum =

2001 murder in Zürich, Switzerland

Abraham Grünbaum
- אברהם גרינבוים
- Born: 1930; Poland
- Died: 7 June 2001 (aged 70–71); Zürich, Switzerland
- Cause of death: Homicide by shooting
- Occupations: orthodox rabbi and leader of a yeshiva in Bnei Brak
- Known for: Victim of unsolved murder

Abraham Grünbaum (Hebrew: אברהם גרינבוים; 1930 – June 7, 2001) was an orthodox rabbi and leader of a yeshiva in Bnei Brak. His death is one of the currently unsolved murder cases in Switzerland.

Grünbaum survived World War II in a work camp in Siberia, while his parents have been murdered in his native Poland.

== Murder and aftermath ==
Grünbaum died on June 7, 2001 in Zürich.

On a visit to Switzerland, Grünbaum was shot near 10:00 PM on the Weberstrasse road near the Hallwyl square when he was on his way to the maariv prayer. The two bullets, fired from at distance of less than two meters, hit Grünbaum in the upper body. An envelope containing more than 1000 Swiss Francs in donations, as well as his airline tickets, were still found on his body.

An involvement of the German right-wing NSU terror group in this murder has been debated, but as of 2017, there has not been any proof of such a connection.

== See also ==
- List of unsolved murders (2000–present)
