= Fernando Solijon =

Filipino radio journalist and murder victim

- Born: ca. 1966; Philippines
- Died: August 29, 2013; Iligan, Lanao del Norte, Philippines
- Cause of death: Gun shot
- Resting place: St. Michael Cemetery
- Occupation: Journalist
- Years active: 2006 - 2013
- Employer(s): DXLS, an affiliate of the Love Radio Network
- Known for: Radio announcer for DxLs radio station
- Spouse: Melly
- Children: 1 daughter, Jed

Fernando "Nanding" Solijon (c. 1966 – August 29, 2013), a Filipino radio journalist for DXLS, an affiliate of the Love Radio Network in Iligan City, Philippines. Solijon was known for being analytical of alleged corruption and wrongdoing in the Philippines. Solijon was shot multiple times as he was getting into his car after drinking with friends. Solijon died on his way to the hospital, at 48 years old.

== Personal ==
Solijon is survived by his nineteen-year-old daughter Jed and Melly, his forty-four-year-old wife.

== Career ==
Fernando Solijon was a radio commentator of DXLS love radio and worked there for seven years.

== Death ==
Iligan, Philippines is in the Philippines shown here relative to the capital Manila.

Melly, Solijon's wife has confirmed that he has been receiving many death threats and before the May 13 national midterm and local elections the death threats had become more harsh. Mely also confirmed that the threats prompted Solijon to be very cautious, and Solijon thanked God for letting him live to see his 47th birthday on June 30. Hours after Solijon had died that Thursday night, she received phone calls asking if her husband was confirmed dead. Fernando Solijon was murdered by a gunman. At about 10 pm on Thursday, he left the sari-sari store and was walking across the street to his white Kio Rio car. On August 29 at 10:30 pm, Solijon was gunned down by two motorcycle-riding assailants in Purok 1 of barangay Buruun, no suspects were found. He was shot dead after having a few drinks with some friends on August 29, 2013. Solijon was rushed to the hospital but when they arrived Solijon was dead from gunshot wounds on his forehead, abdomen and shoulders. A number of shells from a .45 calibre handgun was recovered from the scene by police investigators.

== Context ==
As this case was investigated by police to see if his death was work related, Solijon would be the 159th journalist murdered in the Philippines since the fall of the dictator Ferdinand Marcos in 1986.

== Impact ==
He is left being known as hard working for his commentaries, and his gunman was offended by his criticism. Although, Solijon has been receiving a ton of death threats through letters and phone. He lived to see his 47th birthday which Solijon and his wife say is a miracle. When Solijon passed, his favorite song called, All My Life by America, was played on the radio on repeat.

== Reactions ==
Noberto "Boy" Altres, Solijon's colleague at DXLS said "Why resort to killing Nanding? If they have grievances, they can always go to court. If they think they can silence us, they are dead wrong."

Catubay told the people who gathered at the plaza said "The killing of Nanding is really chilling. It was hard at first to imagine that while we in the station commemorated yearly the Maguindanao massacre, this happens now to one of our own here."

Ver Quimco, A lawyer, an anchorman of Balaod ug Kamatuoran said "In a civilized society governed by the rule of Law, there is no space for the idea that just because a person's expression is so displeasing and so contrary to ours, he deserves to be killed. Condoning such idea will necessarily destroy the very foundation of the free society and will bring us back to the Stone Age where it's not the law that rules but only the powerful. I condemn in no uncertain terms the killing of Fernando Nanding Solijon?"

Pimental, chair of the committee on Justice and Human Rights in the Senate said, "The silencing of Solijon is another bloody affront against press freedom in the country which as continually suffered from its shattered image as one of the worsts countries in the world with a staggering record of media killing and abuses."

== See also ==
- Center for Media Freedom and Responsibility (Philippines)
- List of unsolved murders (2000–present)
