= Tiago João da Silva =

Brazilian crime professional

- Da Silva before he was murdered.
- Born: 3 December 1988; Recife, Pernambuco
- Died: 18 December 2005 (aged 17); Recife
- Occupation: Burglar
- Parent: João Antônio da Silva
- Status: Dead
- Conviction: Robbery

Tiago João da Silva (3 December 1988 – 18 December 2005) was a Brazilian burglar who became known as the Menino-aranha (lit. spider-boy) because he scaled buildings to steal. He once scaled a 14-floor building and scaled on more than 40 buildings during his robbery spree, beginning when he was nine. He was murdered in 2005 by unknown assailants.

== Early life ==
Da Silva was born on December 3, 1988, in the Hospital da Tamarineira in Recife, Pernambuco.

== Crimes ==
In August 1997 police registered his first robbery: he scaled the Ticiana building, in Madalena, bringing with him some money and phones. When he was ten he robbed the house of an officer, where he was brought to the Conselho Tutelar where he escaped on the same day. In December 1997 he attempted to steal home appliances from a Justice prosecutor in the Candeias neighborhood in Jaboatão dos Guararapes, where he was arrested and brought to the FUNDAC in Vitória de Santo Antão. After being arrested for three days, he escaped, but was rearrested on the same day.

In 1998 da Silva was then known as the Menino-aranha. He continued to climb buildings and steal from apartments. Arrested, he was brought to the Diretoria da Polícia da Criança e do Adolescente. In some of his robberies he was accompanied by his younger brother, 10-year-old AJS, who did not climb the buildings and waited beneath. When they were arrested, they sniffed glue and carried $7 with them. Brought to the Conselho Tutelar, they escaped three hours later. In late December 1998, his older brother, 13-year-old MJS, accompanied Tiago when he was arrested.

In January 1999, then 11-year-old Tiago attempted to rob a house in Imbiribeira but was arrested and brought to Batalhão Dias Cardoso, and the following day to the Centro de Ressocialização Santa Luzia in Iputinga. There, he spent 11 months and for having good behaviour was sent back to his family.

== Personality ==
Da Silva was a shy boy and talked little. He answered the questions by shaking his head and looking in the other direction. He was a nail-biter and according to his father, then 54-year-old Antônio da Silva, Tiago began robbing after the death of his mother. He was polite when he was at the Conselho Tutelar, but some times was very nervous and threw stones at people. Da Silva liked to be on the newspapers and felt he was like a hero.

== Judges opinions about Tiago ==
Judge Luiz Carlos feared "that such popularity would eventually end the boy's death sentence. Some action had to be taken before he appeared dead in some wasteland." However, Judge Bartolomeu Bueno had a different position when he sentenced: "The spider-boy cannot be considered unimputable. He has the potential for real and subjective danger that needs to be considered."

== Later life ==
On January 18, 2000, da Silva was staying at the Pracinha de Boa Viagem, where he was found sleeping by the homeless, who called the police. In September he began robbing buildings in Piedade and Casa Forte. He was taken to Casarão de Semi-Liberdade, where he later escaped and disappeared.

In 2001 he was arrested in FUNDAC in Abreu e Lima and did go through a detox treatment.

In 2002, when he was 14, when he exited the Centro Eulâmpio Cordeiro, he began to live in the streets, sleeping in the streets of Peixinhos, Olinda, being fed by a resident. He was arrested when he attempted to break into a car with a knife to steal the tape player in the parking lot of the Conjunto Residencial João Paulo II. With him was a man named "Pirro" who was an adult.

Again, he was arrested when he was found in the garage of the Edifício Vivenda das Orquídeas, in the Torre neighborhood. Da Silva was now stealing from houses and cars, explaining that: "I stopped climbing buildings. I now rob only houses that I usually go into at night when people sleep. Many times I entered by the top-hung. Other times I passed by the balcony. I would take my bags to the living room and run away without anyone seeing me."

== Final escape and death ==
On December 18, 2005, da Silva was brought to a hospital with bullet wounds to his hands, thorax and head. Nine days after being captured, he was admitted to the trauma department of HR, nurse 601, to undergo surgery. The operation had to be authorized by a responsible person and Fundac located Tiago's father. João Antônio da Silva, the father, was taken to HR to release the surgery, but couldn't decide for his son because he arrived completely drunk at the hospital. Tiago was thinking the doctors were going to amputate his hand and didn't want to undergo hand surgery.

João Antônio was in no condition to help Tiago. On the night of December 18, one of the surveillance officers missed and the other, at dawn, handcuffed Tiago on the stretcher and went to the bathroom. When he returned the patient was no longer there. The agent was missing Tiago at 00:30 on Sunday, but only recorded his escape at the duty station of Santo Amaro, at 10:22. It was the 39th escape from Tiago João da Silva and also the last.

At 3 am he was spotted in a gafieira. At 4:30 am the Delegacia de Homicídios was informed that there was a body with 14 bullet holes of 380 caliber pistols and 9mm in a square in Boa Viagem. Street boys recognized the body as being from Tiago. Delegate Ivonete Silva of the Homicide Center said that the characteristics of the murder signaled the desire to exterminate him.

== Legacy and aftermath ==
Da Silva was buried on December 20, 2005. From the family, only his father appeared on the funeral. Besides from his father, three assistants from FUNDAC and four other people appeared at the funeral.

The life of da Silva was made into a documentary, called Menino-Aranha, made by journalist Mariana Lacerda. The 13 minutes documentary can be seen on YouTube.

== See also ==
- List of unsolved murders (2000–present)
