= Murder of Frauke Liebs =

2006 murder in Germany

Frauke Liebs
- Born: February 21, 1985; Germany
- Died: after June 27, 2006 (aged 21)
- Cause of death: Homicide
- Body discovered: October 4, 2006

The murder of Frauke Liebs (February 21, 1985 – after June 27, 2006) is an unsolved criminal case in Germany.

== Disappearance ==
Locations
1 Auld Triangle, Paderborn

On June 20, 2006, the 21-year-old student nurse Frauke Liebs disappeared under mysterious circumstances. The last known sighting of her was at a pub in Paderborn's city center, where she and a friend watched the FIFA World Cup match between England and Sweden. While Liebs was still at the pub, she borrowed a friend's mobile phone battery, as the battery on her own phone had been drained. She later returned her friend's battery before leaving the pub at around 11 p.m. Since she probably had no more than five Euro with her, she is believed to have been heading home on foot. The pub was about 1.5 kilometers away from her home.

At 12:49 a.m., her housemate received a text message from Liebs' mobile phone, saying that she would be home later. However, she did not return home that night, and when she also failed to appear at work the day after, her mother reported her missing. The police discovered that the text message had been sent from Nieheim, a small city about 35 km north-east of Paderborn.

In the following days, Liebs called her housemate five times via her mobile phone. Police were able to locate the calls, which all came from different industrial areas in Paderborn. During these calls, Liebs continued to say that she would return home soon, but did not communicate any information about her situation. She provided only vague or evasive answers to questions. Liebs' last phone call was on June 27 in the presence of her sister, who also talked to her. During this conversation, she is said to have answered the question of whether she was being held captive with a faint "yes", immediately followed by a loud "no". Contact broke off after this phone call.

== Discovery and investigation ==
On October 4, 2006, Liebs' skeletonized body was found by a hunter in a forested area next to a Landesstraße ("state road") near Lichtenau. The body was found with the clothes she was wearing on the day of her disappearance. Her mobile phone, handbag, wallet and wrist watch were not found. Due to the condition of the body, the time and cause of Liebs' death could not be determined.

A case analysis by the police came to the conclusion that Liebs was probably held captive in the area around Nieheim and that the phone calls from Paderborn may have been diversionary maneuvers. No motive for the crime has been determined. Over 900 people who were connected to the victim were questioned by the police, and the initial investigation produced a list of five initial suspects. All five were eventually cleared after producing reputable alibis.

The case aroused nationwide interest and was among others presented on the popular television show Aktenzeichen XY… ungelöst ("Case number XY … Unsolved").

== See also ==
- List of solved missing person cases (post-2000)
- List of unsolved murders (2000–present)
