= Centrs department store bombing =

Terrorist attack in Latvia

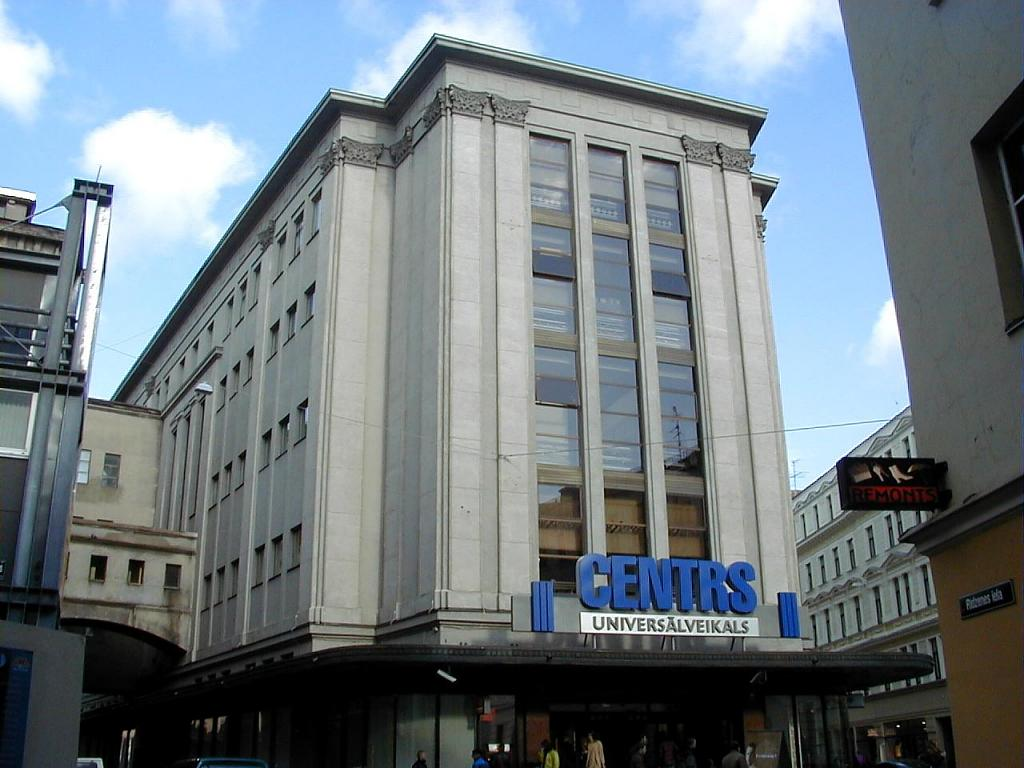
- Image of the department store Centrs in 2002
- Location: Riga, Latvia
- Date: August 17, 2000; 5:19 pm – 5:27 pm (UTC+2)
- Target: Centrs department store
- Attack type: Bombing
- Weapon: Time bombs
- Deaths: 1
- Injuries: 35

The Centrs department store bombing was an attack on a department store in Riga, Latvia on 17 August 2000, where two timed bombs detonated independently of each other. The two blasts occurred in the lobby of the store ten minutes apart. One person was killed while 35 were wounded in the attack.

== Attack ==
The first bomb exploded at 5:19 pm. Police arrived a few minutes later and began an evacuation. The blast had shattered glass windows and filled the ground floor with smoke. Eight minutes later, the second bomb exploded. Dozens were injured, three had to be rushed to hospital whilst 33 others were treated at the scene. One woman died in hospital.

== Investigation ==
After a year and a half, the police arrested a suspect who was later charged for planting the second bomb, but was acquitted by the Supreme Court one year later due to lack of evidence. Since then, no one has been charged or found guilty for the explosions.

== See also ==
- List of unsolved murders (2000–present)
