= Houssenaly Zahid Raza =

Honorary Malaysian Consul in Madagascar, murdered in 2017

- Born: Malaysia
- Died: 24 August 2017; Madagascar
- Cause of death: Ballistic trauma
- Occupation: Diplomat
- Known for: Victim of unsolved murder

Houssenaly Zahid Raza was an Honorary Malaysian Consul in Madagascar, who was murdered on 24 August 2017.

== Biography ==
Raza had been tasked with returning pieces of debris from Malaysia Airlines Flight 370, which vanished on March 8, 2014, en route from Kuala Lumpur to Beijing, with 239 crew and passengers on board. A wreck hunter, Blaine Gibson, has claimed that the murder took place in an effort to hinder the investigation into the plane's disappearance. Gibson also claims he has been subject to death threats, which he says are related to his investigative efforts.

A representative of the Independent Group, which has been following the disappearance of MH370, said the timing of Houssenaly's death was “suspicious” as he had been scheduled to visit the Malagasy transport ministry to retrieve the debris and return it to Malaysia. The representative noted that Houssenaly was of French Malagasy nationality, and added that the diplomat's death had been met with “stony silence” from both French and Malaysian authorities. The diplomat's car was riddled with bullets, and a French news agency has speculated that he had been killed as revenge for his alleged involvement in the 2009 abduction of several residents of Indo-Pakistani descent. Other sources have denied this, and note that he was not convicted of any crime related to that incident.

Malaysia's foreign ministry said Houssenaly was first appointed Malaysia's Honorary Consul in Madagascar in December 2013 for a three-year term – and this was recently extended to December 2019.

== See also ==
- List of unsolved murders (2000–present)
