= Murder of Françoise Chabé =

French murder case

Françoise Chabé
- Born: 1976
- Died: 2005 (aged 28–29); Humbercourt
- Cause of death: strangulation
- Spouse: Ludovic Chabé

Françoise Chabé (1976–2005) was a French woman who was murdered by strangulation on 26 February 2005 at her home in Humbercourt, in the Somme département of northern France. Her husband, Ludovic Chabé, was convicted of her murder in 2013, but was acquitted on appeal in 2015.

== Biography ==
Françoise Chabé was born in 1976. She worked as a secretary at an agricultural wholesaler in Beaumetz-lès-Loges. She was married to Ludovic Chabé, a firefighter based at the fire station in Montreuil, in the suburbs of Paris. At the time of her murder, Françoise was pursuing an extramarital affair with a colleague known only as Stéphane Q.

== Murder and investigation ==
On 2 February 2005, Stéphane Q. had a 17-minute telephone call with Françoise, in which he told her that he was ending their relationship after learning that his wife was pregnant with their second child. In early February 2005, those nearest to Françoise noticed her mood change; she had become anxious and tired. Françoise confided in a colleague: "Now it will never be like it was before." On 26 February 2005, Françoise's husband, Ludovic, said that he discovered her body upon returning home from a 48-hour firefighting shift. He found Françoise lying face down on the living-room floor, strangled with a scarf. Françoise was still wearing her hearing protection device that she used for sleeping. Ludovic turned Françoise onto her back and unsuccessfully attempted to resuscitate her. He phoned the fire brigade at 10.04 a.m. and firefighters arrived at the home at 10.15 a.m.

Police detectives found a cigarette butt on the floor but threw it into the trash. Semen was found but was not stored correctly and could not be analyzed. The forensic pathologist determined Françoise's cause of death to be strangulation. There were no defensive wounds. On 27 February 2005, the day after the murder, Françoise's family cleaned the house. Investigators quickly abandoned the theory of a prowler, and Ludovic became their prime suspect. A neighbour reported seeing Françoise alive through her window between 9 and 9.30 a.m. on 26 February. The same neighbour stated that she then saw Ludovic arrive at the property at 9.30 a.m. Ludovic had been browsing online dating websites and had had a brief fling with a colleague.

Ludovic was quickly arrested. He proclaimed his innocence. The investigators questioned his mother and sister, orchestrating proceedings in such a way that Ludovic could see the interrogation from a neighbouring room. On 3 May 2005, the exhausted Ludovic admitting to killing Françoise by accident during a game. According to his statement, the game was intended to play out as follows: Françoise would be standing up, with Ludovic standing behind her. Ludovic would spread his arms out and clap them shut in front of him. Françoise had to duck before Ludovic's arms came together. However, according to Ludovic, Françoise did not duck quickly enough and his palms slammed against both sides of her head, knocking her unconscious. Ludovic later renounced his confession. He claimed that the examining magistrate sought only to gather evidence favouring the prosecution and ignored exculpatory evidence. According to Ludovic, the police put him under pressure to confess, telling him that if he did not do so, his mother would be charged with the murder.

== Trial ==
On 10 June 2013, Ludovic Chabé's trial began at the Court of Assizes of the Somme département in Amiens. His defence barrister was Philippe Valent, while the prosecution barrister was Philippe Bordereau. On 12 June 2013, Chabé was found guilty and sentenced to 12 years' imprisonment. He appealed against the verdict. On 29 May 2015, Chabé's appeal began at the Court of Assizes of the Oise département in Beauvais. On 5 June 2015, Chabé's conviction was quashed and he was formally acquitted of the crime.

== See also ==
- List of unsolved murders (2000–present)
