= Patrick Tracy Burris =

American spree killer

- Born: August 8, 1967; Maryland, U.S.
- Died: July 6, 2009 (aged 41); Dallas, North Carolina, U.S.
- Cause of death: Gunshot wounds

Details
- Date: June 27–July 3, 2009
- Country: United States
- State: South Carolina
- Killed: 5
- Weapon: .25 pistol
- Date apprehended: July 6, 2009

Patrick Tracy Burris (August 8, 1967 – July 6, 2009) was an American spree killer responsible for at least five known murders in Cherokee County, South Carolina in 2009. Over a span of six days, he shot and killed five people. His final known victim died of her injuries in the hospital on July 4, 2009. On July 6, 2009, police shot and killed Burris during a shootout in Dallas, North Carolina. His gun was matched by ballistics tests to the bullets used in the murders.

== Personal life ==
Burris was known to police as a repeat offender. At the time of his death, he had a criminal record running to more than 25 pages in length, and had just served an eight-year sentence in jail and was released in April 2009. Neil Dolan, deputy director of the South Carolina State Law Enforcement Division, said of Burris: "He was unpredictable. He was scary. He was weird."

== Murders ==
Burris committed the first murder on June 27, 2009, in Gaffney, South Carolina. Peach farmer Kline Cash's wife informed investigators that she and her husband, 63, had spoken to a man about buying hay. After Mrs. Cash left to run some errands, the man returned, and shot and killed her husband in the Cash's living room, where she found his body upon her return.

Four days later on July 1, Burris killed Hazel Linder, 83, and her 50-year-old daughter, Gena Linder Parker. They were bound and shot to death. The following day, Stephen Tyler, 45, was killed in his family's appliance and furniture store; his fifteen-year-old daughter Abby was shot and seriously injured when she came to check on her father. The two were found by Tyler's wife, his older daughter and an employee. Abby Tyler died due to her injuries on July 4. Burris was questioned about killing a 31 year old nurse named Matt Stewart, but was found not to have been involved with the murder.

== Death ==
On July 6, 2009, police were called to a burglary in progress in Dallas, North Carolina, a small town in the northern portion of Gaston County. Eyewitnesses reported seeing a vehicle matching the description of the murder suspect's Ford Explorer outside an apparently abandoned house. Upon arrival, police spoke with Burris, who gave a false name. Officer Kathryn Williamson was able to ascertain the true identity of the subject and discovered he was wanted for a probation violation. The three officers, Williamson, Jim Shaw and Graham Kuzia, entered the house. During the arrest, Officer Kuzia tased Burris and he pulled out a small handgun and fired, shooting Shaw in the upper thigh. The officers returned fire and fatally wounded Burris. Ballistics tests, as well as checks on the suspect's vehicle, later proved the dead gunman to be Burris. Investigators are now trying to determine if Burris is responsible for more murders.

== See also ==
- List of unsolved murders (2000–present)
