= Trofimov beheadings =

2012 beheadings in Kharkiv, Ukraine

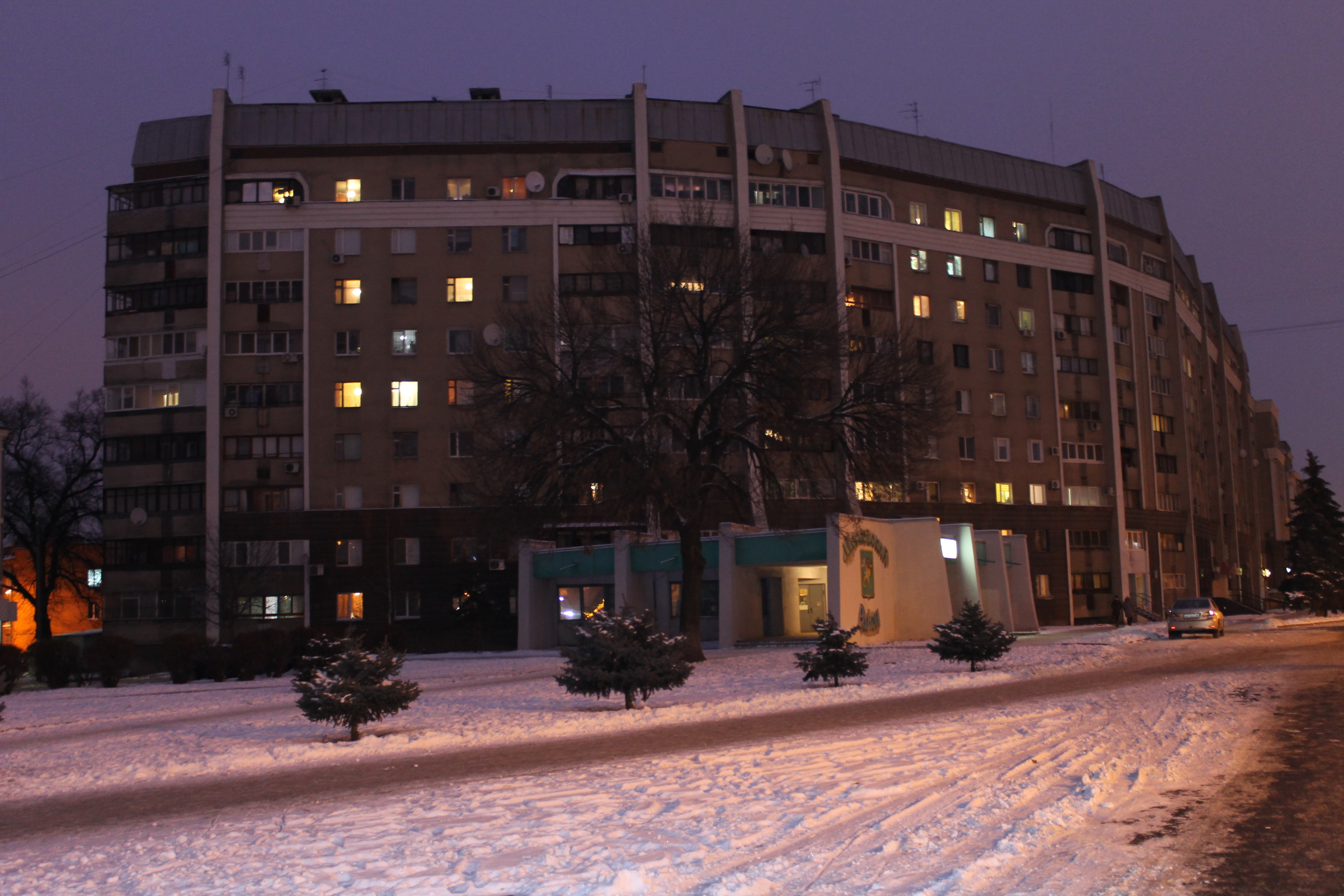
- The crime scene
- Date: 15 December 2012
- Location: Kharkiv, Ukraine
- Type: Home invasion, mass murder
- Motive: Unknown. Possibly revenge or theft
- Target: Trofimov family
- Deaths: Volodymyr Serhiyovych Trofimov (58); Iryna Kostyantynivna Trofimova (59); Sergei Volodymyrovych Trofimov (30); Maria Ihorivna Zuyeva (28)

The Trofimov beheadings was a mass murder committed in 2012 in Kharkiv, Ukraine, in which a judge and his family were beheaded with a machete. The judge, Vladimir Trofimov, his wife Irina, their son Sergei, and Sergei's girlfriend were attacked in the eastern Ukraine city of Kharkiv on December 15, 2012. The judge was attacked at his family home. The bodies were all left at the scene, minus their heads. It was reported that Sergei was beheaded while still alive, while the other victims were beheaded post-mortem.

== Investigation ==
Police stated that the motive for the murders was either revenge or theft. Trofimov, 58, had worked as a magistrate and judge for more than 30 years, and was a noted antiques collector. The attack came on a celebration day for judges in Ukraine. The case was described as one of the most shocking to emerge from the new European state in the international media, with many commentators using the case to spotlight the flawed Ukrainian judicial system.

== See also ==
- List of unsolved murders (2000–present)
