= Donald Young (choir director) =

American elementary teacher and choir director of Trinity United Church of Christ

- Born: April 5, 1960
- Died: December 23, 2007 (aged 47); Chicago, Illinois, U.S.
- Cause of death: Multiple gunshot wounds
- Resting place: Oak Woods Cemetery, Cook County, Illinois, U.S. 41.77306°N 87.60012°W (approximate)
- Occupations: Grade school teacher Choir director
- Known for: Unsolved murder victim

Donald Young (April 5, 1960 – December 23, 2007) was an American elementary school teacher and choir director of Trinity United Church of Christ, attended by Barack Obama prior to the Barack Obama 2008 presidential campaign. Young was found murdered on December 24, 2007.

== Early life and education ==
Young was the fourth of eight siblings. He started attending Trinity United Church at age 12, and was known as the type of person to live every day to the fullest and made a positive impression on those who met him. His Reverend Jeremiah Wright described him as "one of those success stories".

He received a Bachelor's Degree from Chicago State University, Chicago State University, followed by a Master's Degree in Education at University of Illinois Chicago in May 2007.

== Career ==
Young was teacher of fourth and fifth grade at the Guggenheim Elementary School.

Young was a founding member of Trinity United Church of Christ, and, for over 20 years, was director of the choir and a deacon. Trinity is an African-American church in Chicago. The choir had just performed a Thirty Year Anniversary performance.

Reverend Stacey Edwards-Dunn, a member of the church staff said of Young; "He was always so energetic and enthusiastic about the church and about music".

== Death ==
Locations
1 East 69th street

Chicago Police said Young was found by his roommate about 7:30 a.m. on Sunday 23 December 2007, dead from multiple gunshot wounds including at least one to the head. Young's roommate found the door to their apartment on East 69th Street closed but unlocked.

Some valuables were missing from the apartment, but the motive for the homicide was never settled as robbery nor was anyone arrested for the murder.

== See also ==
- List of unsolved murders (2000–present)
