= Murder of Kirsty Jones =

2000 murder in Thailand

Kirsty Jones
- Born: Kristy Sarah Jones; 1976 or 1977; United Kingdom
- Died: 10 August 2000 (aged 23); Chiang Mai, Thailand
- Cause of death: Strangulation
- Known for: being the victim of an unsolved murder
- Mother: Sue Jones

The murder of Kirsty Jones, a British national on holiday in Thailand, took place in 2000. Jones was found raped and strangled on 10 August in her hotel room in Chiang Mai. The case, which received widespread national and overseas press coverage, went unsolved and was officially closed on the day of the 20th anniversary of the murder when the statute of limitations expired in 2020. According to Thai law, twenty years is the limit for bringing charges in a murder. Jones' killer has not been identified and no one has been charged with her murder.

== See also ==
- Cold case
- List of unsolved murders (2000–present)
