= Fausto Valdiviezo =

Ecuadorian journalist and murder victim

Fausto Guido Valdiviezo Moscoso
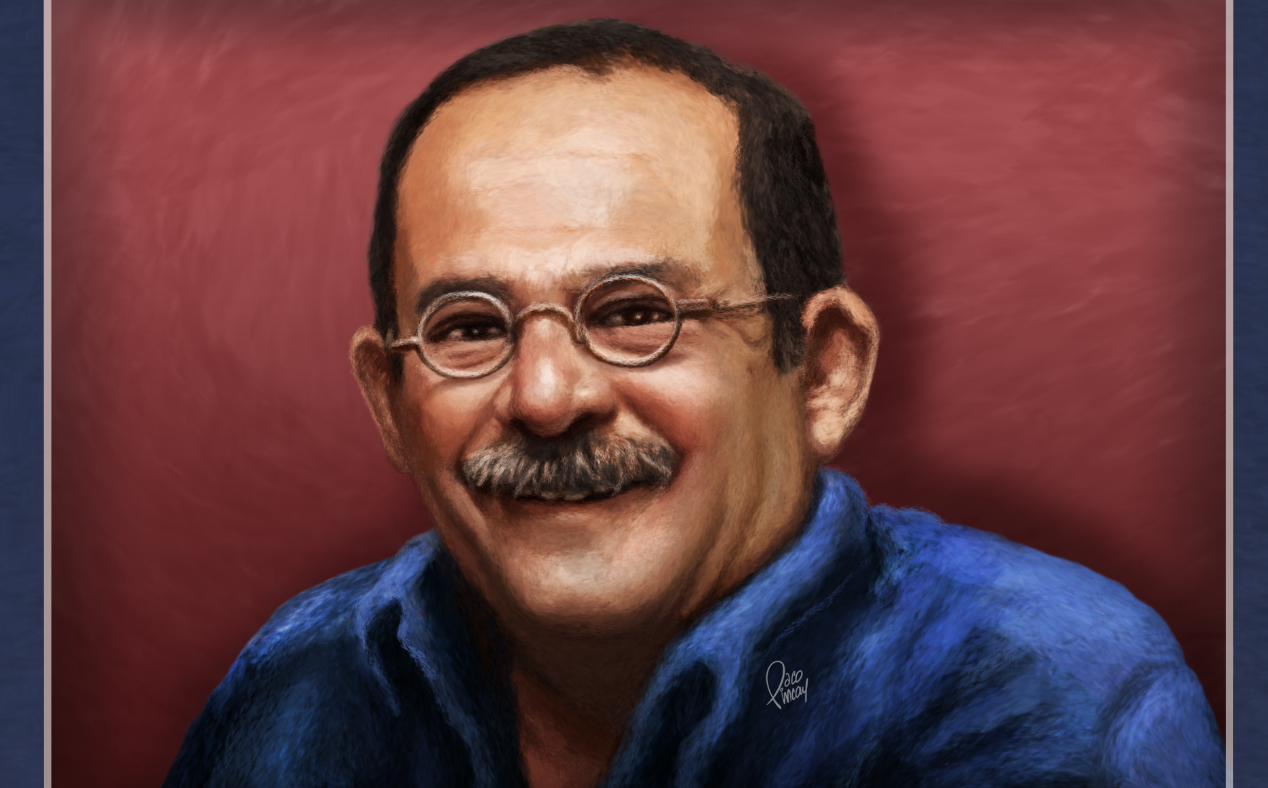
- Fausto Valdiviezo digital portrait, made by Paco Pincay in 2013.
- Born: August 21, 1959; Guayaquil, Ecuador
- Died: April 11, 2013 (aged 53); Guayaquil, Ecuador
- Occupations: Journalist and TV presenter
- Years active: 1983– 2013
- Children: 3

Fausto Guido Valdiviezo Moscoso (August 21, 1959 in Guayaquil – April 11, 2013 in Atarazana, Guayaquil) was a senior Ecuadorian journalist and television presenter who was murdered after 29 years in journalism.

== Career ==
Fausto Valdiviezo began as a journalist for several radio stations, and was in the decade of the 80s when he ventured into television as a reporter and news in the area and community. He worked for television networks Ecuavisa, Teleamazonas, SíTV (now Canal Uno), RTS and TC Televisión. Theirs was communication and was part of several means, the last Teleamazonas channel where he had worked and prepared to return to the TV in 2013.

== Death ==
Valdiviezo was killed from gunshot wounds as he was shot by a man while he was driving. He left a message with his lawyers before he was killed which named his potential enemy if he happened to be killed. The ex-wife of the journalist declared to the Attorney that two cartons appeared to contain documents on allegations that the communicator had, would have disappeared hours after the murder.

== Reactions ==
Irina Bokova, UNESCO's director-general, condemned Fausto Valdiviezo Moscoso's murder.

== See also ==
- List of unsolved murders (2000–present)
