= Islam Bibi =

Afghan police officer

- fair use image
- Born: 1974
- Died: 4 July 2013 (aged 38–39); Lashkar Gah, Afghanistan
- Occupation: Police officer
- Notable work: Fight for feminism

Islam Bibi (Dari: اسلام بی‌بی,Pashto: اسلام بي بي; 1974 – 4 July 2013) was a female police officer in Afghanistan in the Helmand province Headquarters and also a pioneer in the fight for feminism.

She was the highest ranking policewoman at the time of her death in Afghanistan and led operations against the Talibans. She received numerous death threats and was assassinated on 4 July 2013.

== Life ==
Bibi was born in Kunduz province in 1974. She was a refugee in Iran when the Taliban took control of Afghanistan in the 1990s. She returned to Afghanistan in 2001, then set about raising her family at home before joining the police against her family's will. This prompted her brother to try to kill her because he wanted to save the honor of the family name.

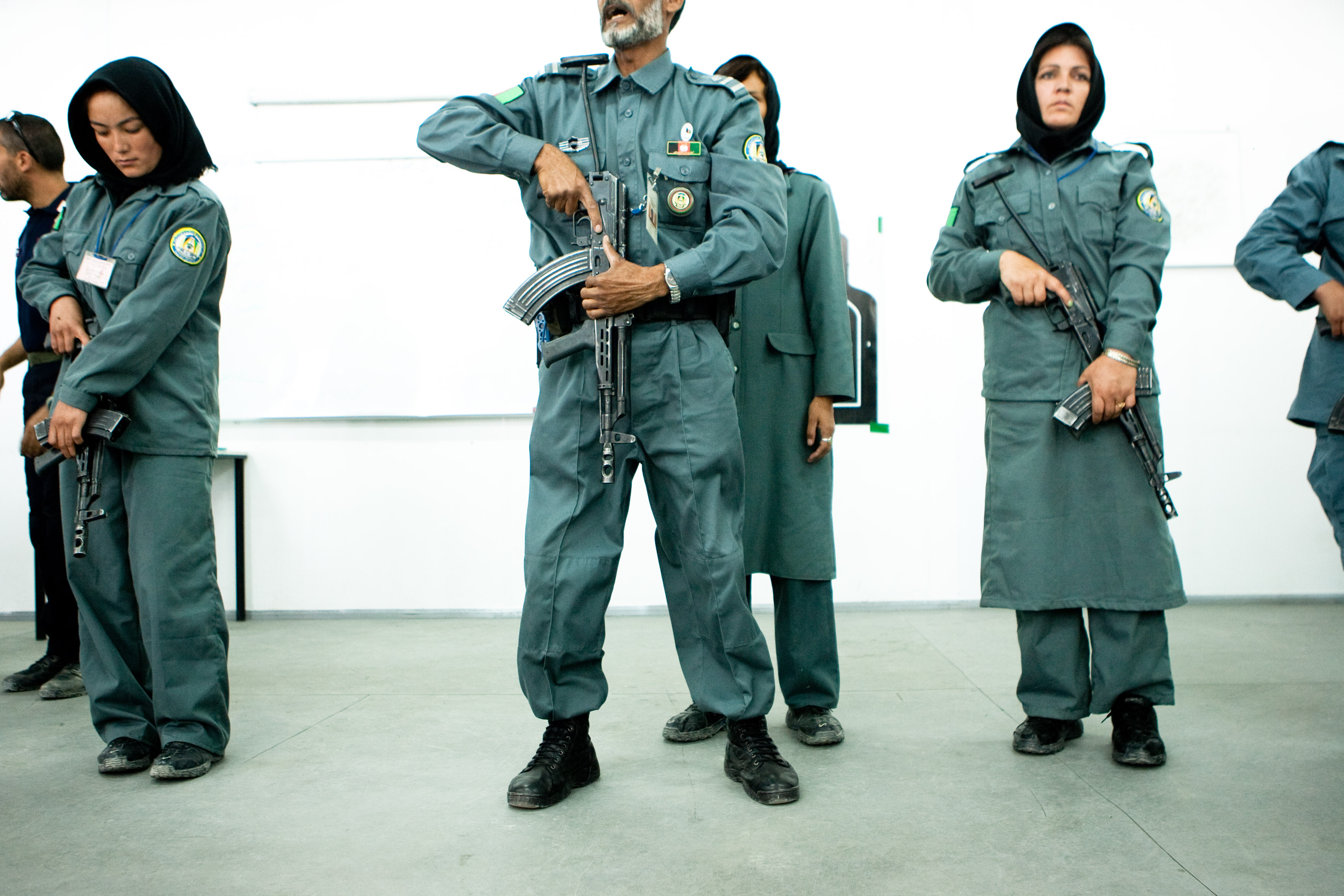
Police women in Afghanistan in 2010

Bibi joined the police force in 2003 and quickly moved to the position of second lieutenant reporting directly to CID leadership which was an extraordinary achievement. She was the highest-ranking policewoman at that time and received many death threats. She led one of the largest police female squadrons in Afghanistan that chased after the Taliban, searching for costumed suicide bombers in burqas. They were first to break into any house during a search in women's areas where male police officers are not allowed. As police officers, they covered their faces with black scarves, wore thick boots, and in some cases chose to wear men's uniforms. Human Rights Watch says that female police officers often experience sexual harassment and verbal abuse by their male counterparts, in part because they lack even basic facilities. There are very few female restrooms at all police stations in Afghanistan, and women who use men's restrooms are highly vulnerable to harassment.

== Death ==
Bibi was shot when she left her home on the morning of 4 July 2013. She was attacked while riding a motorcycle with her son-in-law in Lashkar Gah, the capital of Helmand province. Bibi was wounded and died of her injuries in the hospital emergency room. No investigation has been launched to find out who was responsible for the shooting.

== See also ==
- List of unsolved murders (2000–present)
