= Murder of Eunice Olawale =

2016 murder in Abuja, Nigeria

- Location: Kubwa, Abuja, Nigeria
- Date: 9 July 2016; 5:00 a.m. – 5:30 a.m.
- Target: Eunice Olawale
- Attack type: Stabbing
- Deaths: 1 killed (Eunice Olawale)
- Perpetrator: suspected Muslim extremists

Eunice Olawale was a Nigerian Christian female preacher who was murdered by suspected Muslim extremists in the early hours of July 9, 2016 while evangelizing in the Federal capital city of Abuja.

== Background ==
Eunice (born, July 23, 1974) was a deaconess of the Divine Touch Parish of the Redeemed Christian Church of God and a mother of seven. She was an indigene of Ekiti State and had been married to her husband, Elisha Olawale, from Ondo state since 2000. She was described by her husband as hardworking, God-fearing and supportive in sustaining the family. She was also described by others as a humble woman and a passionate preacher. The family lived in the Kubwa area of the capital city of Abuja, Nigeria. She was well known to have been preaching in that area for many years.

== Incident ==
Eunice usually left her home every morning at 5 a.m. before dawn to evangelize (usually referred to as morning cry) in the streets of Abuja. Several days before her gruesome murder, she overheard nearby Muslims comment about her preaching, that she should be chased away. She also overheard another conversation from a mosque behind their home which implied that her preaching wasn't the truth about God. After she informed her husband about what she heard, he cautioned her to be careful. After those incidents, Eunice suspended her daily morning evangelism for about a week after which she resumed. A Muslim cleric who came to their house requested for food for his Islamic school. After she stated that she didn't have any food to give him at that time, he left.

Eunice was murdered on the 9th of July, 2016 after she left the house at the usual time to preach. According to several media reports, Eunice was murdered between 5 a.m. and 5:30 a.m. Accounts differ as to the exact manner she was murdered. Several reports stated that she was beheaded and stabbed. Other sources stated that she was stabbed multiple times in the stomach and the leg before bleeding to death. People heard her screaming "Blood of Jesus!" at about the time she was murdered. At around 6: 30 to 7:30 am, her husband Olawale woke up from his bed. The first sign of his wife's murder were alarming calls from his children about comments made by some nearby football players, specifying a woman killed while preaching and her lifeless body lying on the ground in a pool of blood. Immediately, he heard the information, Olawale dialed his wife's phone to verify, but realized it had been switched off. Afterwards, Olawale got more information and directive to confirm his dead wife at the police station. He saw her lifeless body. Her megaphone, bible and mobile phone were still close to her body.

== Aftermath ==
The gruesome murder of Eunice sparked outrage on social media among Nigerians especially between Christians and Muslims which further revealed divides among religious lines. The state of religious tolerance in the country became an issue of concern. Six suspects were arrested in connection with the murder. Many residents living close to the area where Eunice was murdered moved away for fear of being arrested as suspects. Christians were urged to protect themselves as much as possible especially while evangelizing. The wife of the Vice President, Oludolapo Osinbajo and pastor E. A. Adeboye paid condolence visits to the family. Her burial was put on hold until further investigations revealed the perpetrators and brought them to justice. Eunice's murder did not deter other preachers, one of whom was reported to continue her morning preaching at the exact spot Eunice was murdered. The Christian Association of Nigeria (CAN) and the Pentecostal Fellowship of Nigeria (PFN) gave the Nigerian police 14 days ultimatum to undergo further investigations pertaining to her murder and bring the perpetrators to book. Her death case remains unresolved.

== See also ==
- List of unsolved murders (2000–present)
