= Murder of Jill-Lyn Euto =

Murder of American teen

Coordinates: 43°3′15″N 76°8′39″W

Jill-Lyn Euto
- Jill-Lyn Euto
- Born: March 20, 1982; Syracuse, New York, U.S.
- Died: January 28, 2001 (aged 18); Syracuse, New York, U.S.
- Mother: Joanne Browning

Jill-Lyn Euto (March 20, 1982 – January 28, 2001) was an American teenager who was found murdered in her apartment in Syracuse, New York, in 2001. Euto had made plans with her mother and sister to watch Super Bowl XXXV at their house elsewhere in the city. When Euto did not show up at their house or respond to phone calls the next day, her mother and sister went to her apartment, where they found her stabbed to death with a knife from her own kitchen. The murder remains unsolved. While suspects have been considered and surveilled by police, no one has ever been publicly named by authorities.

== Biography ==
Jill Lyn Euto's mother was Joanne Browning, and her sister was Jenna. They lived in Colorado Springs, Colorado for most of the 1990s, and moved to New York state in 1997. Euto's father was not active in her life. In 2001, 18-year-old Euto had recently moved out of Browning's house on Butternut Street in Syracuse, and into a sixth-floor apartment of 600 James Street in the city's neighborhood of Near Northeast. While working at clothing store Aeropostale at the Shopping Town Mall, she studied to be a paramedic, hoping to work for Rural Metro. Euto had made plans to watch Super Bowl XXXV with Browning and Jenna on January 28, 2001, at the Butternut Street home. Euto's uncle said she trusted easily, and that could have led to her death, but he did not know her to have anyone in her life who could kill her.

== Murder ==
On January 28, Euto did not show up to watch the football game. When Browning and Jenna unsuccessfully tried to contact Euto, they became worried. Browning continued making calls over the next day, which were "unanswered and unreturned". The next day, when she heard Euto had missed work, Browning and Jenna decided to go over to Euto's apartment. Walking inside, they found Euto unresponsive, having "multiple stab wounds and a cut to the neck". The stab wounds came from Euto's own kitchen knife. Police responded to the scene, and she was declared to have been dead for some amount of time before Browning entered. There were "very little clues left at the scene".

== Investigation and aftermath ==
To this day, the culprit has never been caught. Police have looked at multiple people as suspects, but nobody has ever been named publicly. Despite years of investigation, which included many conducted interviews, the case remains unsolved. The case file, which is still open, became one of the largest the Syracuse Police Department ever had. Detective Chris DeJoseph says the department will not stop working on the case until they can close it. There were still suspects being looked at and surveilled by investigators as of 2016. That year, Syracuse Police also announced they would use DNA evidence to build a suspect profile. As of 2001, there was a $13,000 reward for anyone who gave the police information that leads to the conviction of the killer.

The murder came after the deaths of Browning's father in 1999 and mother in 2000. Since the murder, she was out of work on a stress-related disability, and spent her time trying to find Euto's murderer. She put up fliers and two billboards regarding the murder, and set up a reward fund and informational website. Following the murder, Joanne Browning did multiple media interviews, appeared on national television on shows such as The Sally Jessy Raphael Show and The Montel Williams Show. The case was also profiled on America's Most Wanted. In 2006, Browning filed a lawsuit against the property owner of the apartment. The complaint alleged that the property owners failed to "take minimal precautions to protect decedent from foreseeable harm from the criminal conduct of a third party." The case was dismissed due to lack of proof of negligence on behalf of the property owner. Browning died of a fall in 2007.

== See also ==
- List of unsolved murders (2000–present)
