= Murder of Snehal Gaware =

Murder in India on 20 July 2007

Snehal Gaware
- Born: Dombivli
- Died: 20 July 2007 (aged 21); Andheri
- Cause of death: Asphyxia by suffocation
- Body discovered: 21 July 2007
- Occupation: student

Snehal Gaware, a resident of Dombivli, Thane, Maharashtra, in India, was murdered on 20 July 2007.

== Murder ==
Gaware was studying at the Sardar Patel College of Engineering, Andheri. She lived with her parents in Dombivli, at the Ninad Society where she had been recuperating from a leg injury in June 2007. On 20 July 2007, she was missing from home when her mother returned. The following day, Gaware's body was found with her mouth gagged, and her hands and legs tied in the drawer of her bed. The post-mortem report indicated that the cause of death was asphyxia caused due to smothering.

== Aftermath ==
Gaware's boyfriend was arrested and charged with her murder in April 2010. He had continued his education in the United States in the meantime. Police dropped the charges the following year, citing a lack of evidence.

== See also ==
- 2008 Noida double murder case
- List of unsolved murders (2000–present)
