= Huntington, West Virginia prom night murders =

Unsolved homicide from 2005 in West Virginia, USA

Prom Night Murders
- Location: Huntington, West Virginia
- Date: May 22, 2005
- Attack type: Shooting Quadruple Homicide
- Deaths: 4
- Perpetrator: Unknown
- Motive: Unknown

The Prom Night Murders is an unsolved homicide case that occurred on May 22, 2005, in Huntington, West Virginia, when four teenagers, 16-year-old Megan Poston, 17-year-old Michael Dillon, 18-year-old Eddrick Clark, and 19-year-old Donté Ward, were shot and killed on their prom night, on Charleston Avenue. Despite an extensive investigation, no suspect has been identified, and the case remains unsolved.

Police suspected an individual of ordering the killings, which she denied. That individual was convicted of another killing in 2008 and paroled in 2025.
