= Death of Brian Egg =

2018 death of an American man in San Francisco, California

- The photograph of Brian Egg used by the San Francisco Police Department
- Location: San Francisco, California, U.S.
- Date: August 17, 2018 (discovered)
- Attack type: Homicide (blunt-force trauma) and dismemberment

On August 17, 2018, the remains of 65-year-old Brian Egg were discovered inside his San Francisco home, concealed in a large fish tank. Egg had been reported missing earlier in the month, and his absence had already worried neighbors and family members who had been trying to contact him. Following the discovery, police opened a homicide investigation and later ruled his death a killing. The case received widespread media coverage, but no suspect has been convicted in connection with his death.

Two men were identified as persons of interest in the investigation into Egg's disappearance and death, a 39-year-old Lance Silva and 52‑year‑old Robert McCaffrey, both San Francisco residents who were arrested at a hotel after neighbors reported suspicious activity at Egg's home. Silva and McCaffrey were initially booked on suspicion of homicide, identity theft, and related charges after police found evidence suggesting they had been living in Egg's residence and using his financial accounts, including the purchase of a BMW with Egg's credit card.

Prosecutors later dropped the charges as the investigation continued, and McCaffrey was released while Silva remained in custody on an unrelated probation violation. Neither has been convicted in connection with Egg's death.

== Background ==
Brian Egg lived on Clara Street in San Francisco's South of Market neighborhood. Neighbors remembered him as a quiet and friendly man who often walked his dog and was known around the area. In the weeks before his disappearance, he had little contact with his family. Residents had been discussing his absence on Nextdoor since August 2, and one neighbor even called the police to request a welfare check. A man claiming to live at Egg's home told police that Egg was on vacation, and authorities appeared to accept this explanation for a time. Egg was last seen in late May 2018, and when relatives could not reach him, his sister filed a missing-person report on August 7. Police attempted several welfare checks at his home but initially found nothing suspicious, believing he might simply have been away.

== Discovery ==
A neighbor noticed unusual activity outside Egg's home on August 14, 2018. Seeing a person lingering near the house and a cleaning truck parked nearby, they contacted the police. Police arrived and briefly detained someone at the scene. When officers entered the residence, they did not immediately find Egg, but they noticed a strong odor and cleaning materials that raised concerns, leading them to continue their investigation. Over the following four days, cadaver dogs assisted investigators in a thorough search of the property. On August 17, they located a human torso in a fish tank in a concealed area of the residence, without a head and hands, which is presumed to be Egg's remains. The remains were later confirmed to be those of Egg through DNA testing. The San Francisco Medical Examiner's Office performed an autopsy to determine the cause of death, which was ruled as blunt-force trauma.

== Investigation ==
After Egg's body was found, the San Francisco Police Department launched a homicide investigation. Two men who knew Egg, Robert McCaffrey, 52 and Lance Silva, 39, were taken into custody. They were initially charged with homicide, identity theft, fraud, and elder abuse. Later, the District Attorney's Office dropped the charges as the investigation continued, although Silva remained in custody due to probation violations.

The police asked anyone who might have seen Egg or had contact with his home to come forward with information. Even with extensive news coverage and attention from true crime shows, no one has been held responsible for Egg's death. A year after he was found, friends and neighbors expressed their disappointment that the case had not been solved. The investigation has stood out because of the shocking and unusual way his body was concealed.

== See also ==
- Crime in San Francisco
