= List of solved missing person cases (2000s) =

This is a list of solved missing person cases in the 2000s.

== 2000 ==
Date	Person(s)	Age	Country of disappearance	Circumstances	Outcome	Time spent missing or unconfirmed
2000	Zebb Quinn	18	United States	Zebb Quinn was an 18-year-old American male who went missing on January 2, 2000, in Asheville, North Carolina. On July 25, 2022, Quinn's friend, Robert Jason Owens, entered a plea bargain and confessed from prison that his abusive uncle, Walter "Gene" Owens, killed Quinn after forcing Owens to lure Quinn to the forest. Owens and his uncle dismembered and burned Quinn's body in Bent Creek Experimental Forest. The defense claimed that the boyfriend of a girl Quinn liked hired Gene to kill Quinn.	Murdered	Never found
2000	Suzette Trouten	27	United States	A victim of serial killer John Edward Robinson. Trouten was murdered in Kansas in March 2000; her body was discovered concealed inside a drum upon Robinson's farm three months later.	Murdered	3 months
2000	Nikole Bakoles	19	United States	Bakoles went missing in March 2000, and her skeletal remains were found in October that year; her identity was only confirmed in 2012. The cause of her death was unknown.	Died (unknown cause)	7 months
2000	Lena Sløgedal Paulsen	10	Norway	Sløgedal Paulsen and Sørstrønen were two girls who went missing on May 19, 2000, after swimming in a local lake (Stampe 3.) near Baneheia, Norway. Their bodies were found two days later at nearby Stampe 2. There is controversy surrounding the sentencing of one of the alleged perpetrators.	Murdered	2 days
2000	Austegard Sørstrønen	8	Norway	Sløgedal Paulsen and Sørstrønen were two girls who went missing on May 19, 2000, after swimming in a local lake (Stampe 3.) near Baneheia, Norway. Their bodies were found two days later at nearby Stampe 2. There is controversy surrounding the sentencing of one of the alleged perpetrators.	Murdered	2 days
2000	Nura Luluyeva	40	Russia	Nura Luluyeva was kidnapped in Grozny on 3 June 2000. Her body was found in February 2001.	Murdered	8 months
2000	Lucie Blackman	21	Japan	Lucie Blackman was a British woman working in Japan as a hostess who went missing after a paid date with a client on July 1, 2000. Her mutilated body was found buried in a shallow grave in Miura, Kanagawa, on February 9, 2001. Several months later, Joji Obara was arrested for her rape and murder.	Murdered	7 months
2000	Sarah Payne	8	United Kingdom	Sarah Payne was an eight-year-old schoolgirl abducted and murdered in West Sussex, England, by known child sex offender Roy Whiting on July 1, 2000. Her body was discovered in the village of Pulborough on July 17.	Murdered	16 days
2000	Iriana DeJesus	5	United States	DeJesus was a five-year-old American child who was kidnapped, raped and murdered in Philadelphia, Pennsylvania, by a Honduran national named Alexis Flores in July 2000. Her body was discovered on August 3 in the basement of a deserted apartment building where Flores resided. Later linked to the murder via DNA profiling, Flores was added to the FBI's Top Ten Most Wanted Fugitives.	Murdered	5 days
2000	Molly Bish	16	United States	Molly Bish was an American teenage girl who disappeared from Warren, Massachusetts on 27 June 2000 and was found dead on 9 June 2003. Her death remains unsolved.	Murdered	Less than 3 years
2000	Marianne Pedersen	36	Denmark	On July 3, 2000, Marianne Pedersen and her two sons disappeared and are victims of serial killer Peter Lundin. as he was convicted of killing them.	Murdered	Never found
2000	Ivan Stambolić	63	Yugoslavia	Ivan Stambolić was a high ranking Serbian politician who was once both the president and prime minister of Serbia. Stambolić was abducted in Fruška Gora, Serbia, Yugoslavia on 25 August 2000. It was later discovered that he had been killed.	Murdered	3 years
2000	Pearl Sevenstar	20	United States	Sevenstar was murdered by her half-brother, Terry Hankins, on 1 October 2000. Her body was concealed in a car at his father's automotive shop. Her body was discovered at his father's automotive shop the following year.	Murdered	10 months
2000	Ernie Hankins	75	United States	Hankins was murdered by his own son, Terry Hankins, on 8 October 2000. His body was hidden inside an Arlington mobile home.	Murdered	10 months
2000	Leanne Tiernan	16	United Kingdom	Tiernan was a 16-year-old Leeds schoolgirl abducted on 16 November 2000. Her body was discovered in Lindley Woods, North Yorkshire, in August 2001. Tiernan's murderer, John Taylor, pleaded guilty to her murder the following year.	Murdered	9 months
2000	Mike Williams	31	United States	Mike Williams was an American man who disappeared on December 16, 2000, during a hunting trip to Lake Seminole. He remained missing until October 2017, when law enforcement received information on the whereabouts of his body, close to Tallahassee. Florida officials confirmed that Williams was a victim of homicide. Williams' best friend, Brian Winchester, confessed to shooting Williams on the hunting trip and divulged the location of the body. The motive was Winchester's ongoing affair with Williams' wife, Denise, who was sentenced to life in prison for the murder in January 2019 (later reduced to 30 years for conspiracy to commit first-degree murder).	Murdered	17 years

== 2001 ==
Date	Person(s)	Age	Country of disappearance	Circumstances	Outcome	Time spent missing or unconfirmed
2001	Bridget Townsend	18	United States	On the night of January 15, 2001, 18-year-old Bridget Townsend was abducted from her drug dealer boyfriend's house by a customer of her boyfriend. The abductor, 18-year-old Ramiro Felix Gonzales, forcibly took her to his grandfather's ranch and raped her before he used a rifle to fatally shoot her. Gonzales, who was later caught and sentenced to life in prison for another case of rape and kidnapping, confessed to the murder and led the police to a field where he disposed of Townsend's body in October 2002. Gonzales was convicted of capital murder and sentenced to death, and later executed on June 26, 2024.	Murdered	1 year and 10 months
2001	Gloria Polanco	35	Colombia	Wife of then-Governor of Colombia's Huila Department, Jaime Lozada, who was kidnapped with her sons by FARC guerillas in 2001. She was kept as a political hostage, but was later released in a prisoner exchange.	Found alive	7 years
2001	Lucas Vargas Terra	14	Brazil	Lucas Terra was a Brazilian teenage boy who disappeared from Salvador on March 21, 2001 and was found dead two days later after being killed and raped. Silvio Galiza, a pastor of the Universal Church of the Kingdom of God, was convicted of the crime.	Murdered	2 days
2001	Hannah Williams	14	England	Williams was an English schoolgirl who vanished while going window shopping in Deptford on April 21, 2001. She was presumed to be a runaway until her body was found on March 15, 2002. Irish sex offender Robert Howard, who is suspected of other murders, was convicted of her murder and sentenced to life imprisonment.	Murdered	11 months
2001	Erica Green	3	United States	Three-year-old Erica Green was a murder victim whose decapitated body was discovered on April 28, 2001, in Kansas City, Missouri, 12 to 48 hours after death. Her head was found in a trash bag nearby on May 1, 2001. The victim remained unidentified until May 5, 2005. Her mother and stepfather were convicted of her murder in 2008 and sentenced to 25 years and life in prison, respectively.	Murdered	1–2 days
2001	Chandra Levy	24	United States	Chandra Levy was an American intern at the Federal Bureau of Prisons in Washington, D.C., who was last seen alive on April 30, 2001. Her skeletal remains were found in Rock Creek Park on May 22, 2002.	Murdered	1 year
2001	Don Banfield	63	England	A 63-year-old father who disappeared from his Harrow home in May 2001. Although his body has never been found, Banfield's wife and daughter were found guilty of his murder in 2012, though their convictions were overturned on appeal in 2013.	Murdered	Never found
2001	Mananya Thumpong	13	France	13-year-old Mananya Thumpong failed to return home from her local library in Sedan on May 5, 2001. On March 1, 2002, her skeletal remains were found in a forest in Paliseul. In 2004, Michel Fourniret confessed to kidnapping and killing her.	Murdered	10 months
2001	Koby Mandell	13	Israel	Two Jewish teenagers murdered on the outskirts of the Israeli settlement of Tekoa in the West Bank. The teenagers' bodies were discovered in a cave the following morning. Both had been bound, stabbed and bludgeoned to death with rocks. The perpetrators have not been identified, though Israel and other sources believe unidentified Palestinian terrorists were responsible.	Murdered	1 day
2001	Yosef Ishran	14	Israel	Two Jewish teenagers murdered on the outskirts of the Israeli settlement of Tekoa in the West Bank. The teenagers' bodies were discovered in a cave the following morning. Both had been bound, stabbed and bludgeoned to death with rocks. The perpetrators have not been identified, though Israel and other sources believe unidentified Palestinian terrorists were responsible.	Murdered	1 day
2001	Unnamed American 26-year-old woman	26	United States	On May 11, 2001, serial rapist-kidnapper John Jamelske offered a ride home to a 26-year-old white woman walking in downtown Syracuse while under the influence of LSD. Jamelske took her back to his bunker, where he raped her daily. When she resisted, Jamelske inflicted cigar burns on her; she developed an abscess on her lower back. Jamelske also manipulated her with claims that he was part of an underground slavery syndicate including the police. Jamelske held the woman captive for about two months before releasing her. He later pleaded guilty to five counts of first-degree kidnapping and was sentenced to 18 years to life in prison.	Released	2 months
2001	Danielle Jones	15	England	Last seen at a bus stop near her home in East Tilbury, Essex, Jones' uncle Stuart Campbell was found guilty of her murder in December 2002 (despite her body not being found) after he was found to have used her phone in the period after her disappearance.	Murdered	1 year and 4 months
2001	Peter Falconio	28	Australia	A British tourist from Hepworth, West Yorkshire, who disappeared in the Australian outback in July 2001 while traveling with girlfriend Joanne Lees. Bradley Murdoch was convicted of Falconio's murder and sentenced to life in prison.	Murdered	Never found
2001	Partha Pratim Roy Burman	Unknown	India	Managing director of a shoe store who was kidnapped from a rural road in Tiljala, India, on July 25, 2001, but released over a week later after the ransom was paid. Some of the ransom was allegedly used to fund the September 11 attacks and the 2001 Indian Parliament attack.	Found alive	8 days
2001	Jason Martin-Smith	28	England	Martin-Smith was murdered and his body dismembered by four acquaintances (who were involved in the drug trade) because they believed he was a police informant. His case went unsolved until 2015 when two of his killers, Mark Searle and Steve McNicol, were charged, convicted and imprisoned. The remaining two, Jimmy Millen and Frank Torpey, could not be charged, as Millen had been killed by the others and Torpey died before he could be arrested.	Murdered	Never found
2001	Bill Biggart	54	United States	American freelance journalist who was struck by falling debris while shooting photos of the collapsing towers of the September 11 attacks. His body and camera were recovered four days later.	Killed by debris	4 days
2001	Consuelo Araújo	61	Colombia	Colombian politician, writer and self-taught journalist best known for creating the Vallenato Legend Festival. On September 24, 2001, she was kidnapped and later killed by FARC guerillas, in an effort to prevent her rescue by the Colombian Army.	Murdered	6 days
2001	Jennifer Loman Blagg	34	United States	A six-year-old girl and her mother disappeared from her home in Grand Junction, Colorado on November 13, 2001. Her mother Jennifer Loman Blagg was discovered on June 4, 2002, having been murdered by her father, Michael Francis Blagg. Abigail was never found.	Murdered	7 months
2001	Abigail Jo Blagg	6	United States	A six-year-old girl and her mother disappeared from her home in Grand Junction, Colorado on November 13, 2001. Her mother Jennifer Loman Blagg was discovered on June 4, 2002, having been murdered by her father, Michael Francis Blagg. Abigail was never found.	Unknown	Never found
2001	Don Craig Wiley	57	United States	An American structural biologist who disappeared on November 15, 2001. His body was found in the Mississippi River a month later, and his death was ruled to be an accident.	Accidental death	1 month
2001	Alejandro Narciso Lago	44	United States	A possible victim of suspected serial killer Daniel Conahan. Lago was last seen alive in Miami on November 17, 2001. His body was discovered in Punta Gorda, Florida on January 6, 2002. His body was identified in July 2024.	Murdered	22 years
2001	Stuart Adamson	43	United States	Scottish musician best known as the frontman for the rock group Big Country. Adamson disappeared on November 26, 2001, and was found dead in a hotel room on December 16, 2001. His cause of death was determined to be suicide.	Died by suicide	20 days

== 2002 ==
Date	Person(s)	Age	Country of disappearance	Circumstances	Outcome	Time spent missing or unconfirmed
2002	Alicia Kozakiewicz	13	United States	Abducted from Pittsburgh, Pennsylvania, on January 1, 2002, by 38-year-old Scott Tyree; the two met online, and Kozakiewicz believed they were the same age. She was rescued four days later. She later became a television personality and advocate for internet safety and missing persons, as well as founding the Alicia Project.	Found alive	4 days
2002	Daniel Nolan	14	England	English schoolboy who disappeared from the Hampshire harbour town of Hamble-le-Rice after a fishing expedition on January 1, 2002. Sections of his body were discovered inside two socks in Swanage, Dorset, on May 15, 2003.	Died (unknown cause)	16 months
2002	Danielle van Dam	7	United States	Seven-year-old child from Sabre Springs, San Diego, California, abducted from her bedroom during the night of February 1–2, 2002. Her body was found on February 27 in a remote area. Her murderer, David Alan Westerfield, was arrested on February 22—five days before van Dam's body was discovered. He was convicted of the child's kidnap and first-degree murder.	Murdered	25 days
2002	Daniel Pearl	38	Pakistan	An American journalist who was kidnapped and murdered on February 1, 2002, in Karachi, Sindh, and was found dead on May 16, 2002. Pearl's murder remains unsolved.	Murdered	Less than four months
2002	Clara Rojas	38	Colombia	Colombian presidential candidate and her campaign manager who were kidnapped by FARC guerillas on February 23, 2002. Both of them were freed during separate actions of Operation Emmanuel.	Found alive	6 years
2002	Íngrid Betancourt	41	Colombia	Colombian presidential candidate and her campaign manager who were kidnapped by FARC guerillas on February 23, 2002. Both of them were freed during separate actions of Operation Emmanuel.	Found alive	6 years
2002	Regina de Jesús Betancourt Ramírez	65	Colombia	Ramírez—also known as Regina 11—is a renowned mentalist, psychic, mystic and faith healer. She was kidnapped on February 23, 2002, and held hostage for five months in the mountains of Colombia before being released.	Found alive	5 months
2002	Hocine Soltani	29	France	Algerian boxer who mysteriously disappeared after meeting a man about exporting two cars from Marseille, France. His fate remained unclear until DNA tests conducted two years later confirmed that a body found in the country was his. The man was arrested, convicted and sentenced to eight years' imprisonment for the crime.	Murdered	2 years
2002	Milly Dowler	13	England	13-year-old Milly Dowler disappeared in Walton-on-Thames while on her way home from school on March 21, 2002. In September of that year, mushroom pickers found her remains in a Hampshire forest. British serial killer Levi Bellfield was later convicted of her abduction and murder.	Murdered	6 months
2002	John Darwin	51	England	John Darwin was a former British teacher and prison officer who faked his own death in March 2002 so his wife could collect £250,000 in life insurance. For five years, Darwin lived secretly in the family home and a home immediately adjacent, using an alias. He was arrested in London on December 1, 2007. His wife, Anne, was also arrested and charged with helping Darwin to collect this policy sum and concealing the truth about his disappearance.	Found alive	5 years
2002	Ancízar López López	76	Colombia	Colombian politician who helped create the Quindío Department and became its first governor. On April 11, 2002, he was kidnapped by members of the National Liberation Army, and is said to have died from kidney failure while in detention.	Unknown	Unknown
2002	Gilberto Echeverri Mejía	65	Colombia	Colombian businessmen and Liberal Party politicians kidnapped by FARC guerillas on April 22, 2002. They were held in captivity in Colombia's mountains until they and eight other hostages were killed by their kidnappers in a botched rescue operation.	Murdered	1 year
2002	Guillermo Gaviria Correa	41	Colombia	Colombian businessmen and Liberal Party politicians kidnapped by FARC guerillas on April 22, 2002. They were held in captivity in Colombia's mountains until they and eight other hostages were killed by their kidnappers in a botched rescue operation.	Murdered	1 year
2002	Eunsoon Jun	40s	United States	Eunsoon Jun was a chemist who went missing from Richmond, California. Her murdered body was found 5 months later buried in cat litter in the home that she shared with her boyfriend, who went by the alias "Larry Vanner." "Larry", whose real name was Terry Peder Rasmussen, was found guilty for her murder and died while in prison.	Murdered	5 months
2002	Kari Anttonen	29	Finland	Kari Anttonen was murdered in May 2002 by Janne Hyvönen and Virpi Butt. Anttonen was stabbed, dismembered and cannibalised.	Murdered	Unknown
2002	Elizabeth Smart	14	United States	Smart was kidnapped from her bedroom on June 5, 2002, and was found to be alive when police officers rescued her nine months later on March 12, 2003, in Sandy, Utah, about 18 miles from her home.	Found alive	9 months
2002	Logan Tucker	6	United States	Tucker was a 6-year-old American boy who disappeared on June 23, 2002, and was murdered, though no body was found. His mother, Katherine Rutan, was convicted of first-degree murder in September 2007, and the jury recommended a sentence of life in prison without the possibility of parole. Rutan was sentenced to life without parole in October 2007.	Murdered	Never found
2002	Andreas Hinz	37	England	Hinz was a 37-year-old trainee rabbi last seen in the early hours of July 3 leaving The Black Cap gay bar in Camden, London, after chatting to a man. A few days later, dismembered body parts were found in bin bags near St Pancras Way, and on July 12 the remains were identified as belonging to Hinz. He was murdered by Thomas McDowell.	Murdered	9 days
2002	Tina Baker	41	England	British woman Tina Baker was last seen on July 8, 2002, after saying she was going to feed animals on her family farm in Chobham. Her pet dog was later found abandoned nearby. Police suspected her husband and he was convicted of her murder in 2006. His first wife testified at trial that he threatened to kill her and feed her to pigs during their divorce, and evidence put him near the farm on the day. The motive for the murder appeared to be that he feared he might lose the £100,000, 14-acre farm.	Murdered	Never found
2002	Sara Ann Lewis Trusty	23	United States	Last seen during the evening hours riding her bicycle near her church in Algoa, Texas, on July 12, 2002. Her body was discovered in a Texas City reservoir on July 28.	Murdered	16 days
2002	Jessica Chapman	10	England	On August 4, 2002, two 10-year-old girls, Jessica Chapman and Holly Wells, disappeared after they left Wells' home to buy sweets. Both girls' bodies were found in a ditch by RAF Lakenheath airbase on August 17. Local man Ian Huntley lured the girls into his house and murdered them—likely via asphyxiation—and was sentenced to a minimum of 40 years' imprisonment on December 17, 2003, while his girlfriend Maxine Carr was given a three-and-a-half-year prison sentence for perverting the course of justice (she provided Huntley a false alibi). The 13-day search for the girls has been described as one of the most intense and extensive in British criminal history.	Murdered	13 days
2002	Holly Wells	10	England		Murdered	13 days
2002	Jon-Niece Jones	9	United States	An American girl who disappeared on August 15, 2002, and whose skeletal remains were found by a deer hunter on March 18, 2005, near the gated forest of New Jersey's Six Flags Great Adventure theme park.	Murdered	2 1/2 years
2002	Sydney Collins	Unknown	Australia	A member of a motorcycle gang with links to underworld figures. Collins was last seen alive leaving his Tabulam farm address on August 25, 2002. Notorious Australian criminal Mark "Chopper" Read confessed to Collins' murder shortly before his death in 2013.	Murdered	Never found
2002	Laura Zapata	46	Mexico	Mexican telenovela actress who was kidnapped along with her sister in September 2002, allegedly to elicit a large ransom from her half-sister's husband, multi-millionaire Tommy Mottola. Both were eventually released without incident.	Found alive	18 days
2002	Unnamed African American girl	16	United States	The final victim of serial rapist and kidnapper John Jamelske, and the individual whose abduction led to his downfall. Jamelske abducted the 16-year-old runaway in October 2002; she escaped from captivity by discreetly phoning her sister from a bar on April 8, 2003. The sister in turn returned the call and persuaded the employee who answered the call to notify authorities.	Found alive	6 months
2002	Amanda Zhao	21	Canada	An international student in Vancouver, British Columbia, who disappeared on October 9, 2002. Zhao's body was found in a suitcase by hikers near Stave Lake on October 20, 2002.	Murdered	11 days
2002	Laci Peterson	27	United States	Laci Peterson disappeared from California while eight months pregnant with her first child on December 24, 2002. On April 13, 2003, a couple walking their dog discovered her body. Peterson's husband was found guilty of murdering her.	Murdered	5 months

== 2003 ==
Date	Person(s)	Age	Country of disappearance	Circumstances	Outcome	Time spent missing or unconfirmed
2003	Becky Godden-Edwards	20	England	Twenty-year-old Becky Godden-Edwards was last seen alive on January 1, 2003, entering a taxi outside a nightclub in Swindon, England, after a night out with friends. She was only formally reported missing in 2007. Her body was discovered in March 2011 after a suspect arrested for the murder of Sian O'Callaghan in Swindon led police to O'Callaghan's and Godden-Edwards's bodies. Although the suspect, local taxi driver Christopher Haliwell, confessed to the murder, he was not charged and convicted until 2016.	Murdered	8 years
2003	Estelle Mouzin	9	France	Estelle Mouzin was a nine-year-old girl who disappeared from the city of Guermantes in France on January 9, 2003. Serial killer and pedophile Michel Fourniret confessed to her murder in 2020, although her body has never been found.	Murdered	14 years
2003	Jeff Wright	34	United States	Jeff Wright was stabbed to death on January 13, 2003, by his wife Susan Wright, who buried his body in their Houston backyard before reporting him for domestic abuse. Susan surrendered on January 18 and was charged with murder. She was sentenced to 20 years in prison and was paroled in 2020.	Murdered	5 days
2003	LeAnn Emry	24	United States	On January 30, 2003, 24-year-old Leann Emry disappeared from Moab, Utah. Her remains were discovered in March 2009 in a remote part of the Colorado and Utah border. In October 2009, Scott Lee Kimball, a serial killer, pleaded guilty to murdering Emry.	Murdered	6 years
2003	Marc Gonsalves	31	Colombia	American employees of Northrop Grumman abducted by FARC guerillas in the Colombian jungles on February 13, 2003. They and another man were kept in detention until their release on July 2, 2008.	Found alive	5 years
2003	Keith Stansell	Unknown	Colombia	American employees of Northrop Grumman abducted by FARC guerillas in the Colombian jungles on February 13, 2003. They and another man were kept in detention until their release on July 2, 2008.	Found alive	5 years
2003	Craig Sorger	13	United States	Autistic teenager who was killed by two friends in a park in Ephrata, Washington, on February 15, 2003. He was initially reported missing, but the two boys later revealed the body location, were convicted of his death and given long sentences.	Murdered	3 hours
2003	Jennifer Marcum	25	United States	A victim of serial killer Scott Lee Kimball. Marcum was 25 and resided in Colorado Springs, Colorado. Her vehicle was discovered parked at Denver International Airport on February 18, 2003 (the day after her presumed murder), although her body has never been found.	Murdered	Never found
2003	Hassan Mustafa Osama Nasr	40	Italy	Egyptian Islamic cleric who was kidnapped in Italy by CIA agents, then brought back to Egypt, where he was kept in detention and tortured for four years. His abduction caused the spark of the Abu Omar case.	Found alive	4 years
2003	Salah Aboud Mahmoud	61	Iraq	Iraqi military officer Salah Aboud Mahmoud disappeared following the 2003 invasion of Iraq, and was never heard of again until he died on 21 June 2024.	Died	21 years
2003	Ahmed Siddiqui	9	Pakistan	Siddiqui was kidnapped along with his two younger siblings by their mother, Aafia Siddiqui, in March 2003, while on vacation in Karachi, Pakistan. Since Ahmed was an American citizen, his case was investigated by the FBI, which suspected his mother of connection to extremist groups like al-Qaeda. In the summer of 2008, Aafia and Ahmed were detained by police in Afghanistan, with Ahmed later returned safely to New York. His sister, Mariam, was confirmed via DNA and returned to her family in 2010. Suleman has never been found and was last seen by Ahmed when he and his mother were being detained.	Found alive	5 years
2003	Mariam Siddiqui	5	Pakistan		Found alive	7 years
2003	Suleman Siddiqui	7 months	Pakistan		Unknown	Never found
2003	Hannah Foster	17	England	Foster disappeared while walking home from a night out in Southampton on March 14, 2003. Two days later her body was found in Allington Lane in the city. Foster had made a 999 call but could not be heard on the call. She had been abducted and murdered by Maninder Pal Singh Kohli, who was arrested after 16 months on the run in India and extradited and convicted in 2008.	Murdered	2 days
2003	Xavier Flactif	41	France	David Hotyat shot and killed his landlord and the landlord's wife and three children at their ski chalet in Le Grand-Bornand. The family remained missing for months. He burned their bodies in the forest and was arrested in September after DNA analysis linked him to the bodies.	Murdered	4 months
2003	Graziella Ortolano	36	France	David Hotyat shot and killed his landlord and the landlord's wife and three children at their ski chalet in Le Grand-Bornand. The family remained missing for months. He burned their bodies in the forest and was arrested in September after DNA analysis linked him to the bodies.	Murdered	4 months
2003	Sarah	10	France	David Hotyat shot and killed his landlord and the landlord's wife and three children at their ski chalet in Le Grand-Bornand. The family remained missing for months. He burned their bodies in the forest and was arrested in September after DNA analysis linked him to the bodies.	Murdered	4 months
2003	Lætitia	9	France	David Hotyat shot and killed his landlord and the landlord's wife and three children at their ski chalet in Le Grand-Bornand. The family remained missing for months. He burned their bodies in the forest and was arrested in September after DNA analysis linked him to the bodies.	Murdered	4 months
2003	Grégory	7	France	David Hotyat shot and killed his landlord and the landlord's wife and three children at their ski chalet in Le Grand-Bornand. The family remained missing for months. He burned their bodies in the forest and was arrested in September after DNA analysis linked him to the bodies.	Murdered	4 months
2003	Amanda Berry	16	United States	Berry disappeared on April 21, 2003, the day before her 17th birthday. She was walking home from her job at Burger King. During captivity, Berry gave birth to a daughter. Just over 10 years later, on May 6, 2013, Berry escaped along with Michelle Knight, Gina DeJesus and Berry's daughter. They were in reasonable health and within three miles of the site of their disappearances. They were kidnapped and held captive by Ariel Castro, who was convicted to life imprisonment, and committed suicide in prison.	Found alive	10 years
2003	Romona Moore	21	United States	Moore was a Guyanese immigrant kidnapped from her Brooklyn apartment on April 24, 2003. Her abductors, Troy Hendrix and Kayson Pearson, later tortured, raped and murdered her at an abandoned house, with her body found two months later. Both men were arrested and convicted on all charges in 2006, receiving life imprisonment without parole.	Murdered	2 months
2003	Shelby Tracy Tom	39–40	Canada	A transgender woman strangled to death by 29-year-old Jatin Patel in North Vancouver, British Columbia, on May 27, 2003. Patel murdered Tom upon discovering that Tom was transgender during a sexual encounter. Her body was discovered behind a dry cleaning establishment four days later.	Murdered	4 days
2003	Canny Ong	28	Malaysia	A Malaysian and IT analyst married and employed in the United States. She returned to Malaysia on June 1, 2003, because her father had cancer. After he recovered, Ong was to return to the USA on June 14, 2003. However, the night before that, she was abducted from a shopping center by 27-year-old MAS airplane cleaner Ahmad Najib bin Aris. Ahmad Najib later raped and murdered Ong, whose body was found four days after her reported disappearance. The killer was eventually caught on June 20, 2003, and found guilty of murder and rape in a highly reported trial in February 2005. He was sentenced to death for murder and to 20 years in jail and 10 strokes of the cane for rape. More than 11 years after his trial, and after the loss of his appeals and after the Sultan of Selangor's rejection of his plea for pardon, he was hanged at Kajang Prison on the morning of September 23, 2016.	Murdered	4 days
2003	Arto Malinen	26	Finland	Arto Malinen was murdered on Midsummer's Eve in 2003 by Virpi Butt who stabbed him ten times in the back with a kitchen knife before dismembering the body in an attempt to dispose of the remains.	Murdered	Unknown
2003	Jessica Taylor	20	United States	Taylor was a sex worker who disappeared on July 21, 2003. Her torso—later identified via DNA analysis—was discovered on July 26 in Manorville, New York. The remainder of her body was not discovered until 2011.	Murdered	2 months
2003	Kaysi McLeod	19	United States	On August 23, 2003, 19-year-old Kaysi McLeod disappeared on her way to work. Scott Lee Kimball, a serial killer dating McLeod's mother at the time, was meant to drive her that day but claimed he went hunting instead. McLeod's remains were found by a hunter in Jackson County in 2007. In 2009, Kimball pleaded guilty to murdering Kaysi.	Murdered	4 years
2003	Jean Rock	32	Canada	Serial killer Camille Cléroux murdered his second wife in fall 2003.	Murdered	3 years
2003	Shafilea Ahmed	17	England	British schoolgirl Shafilea Ahmed disappeared from her house in Warrington, Cheshire, on September 11, 2003, and a week later a teacher contacted police. After several police appeals, her body was found in the River Kent in Cumbria in February 2004. She had been suffocated with a plastic bag by her parents in a suspected "honour killing", because they believed she became too Westernised, and they were convicted of her murder in 2012.	Murdered	5 months
2003	Cecilia Zhang	9	Canada	Canadian schoolgirl who was kidnapped for ransom by Chinese international student Min Chen in Toronto on October 20, 2003. She accidentally died during her detention, and her body was discovered on March 27, 2004. He was later sentenced to life imprisonment.	Murdered	6 months
2003	Dru Sjodin	22	United States	Sjodin was an American woman who was abducted from the Columbia Mall on November 22, 2003, in Grand Forks, North Dakota. Her body was recovered on April 17, 2004, near Crookston, Minnesota.	Murdered	5 months
2003	Daniel Morcombe	13	Australia	Morcombe disappeared from the roadside near his Sunshine Coast, Queensland, Australia, home on December 7, 2003. His remains were found in 2011 as forensic testing confirmed that the bones were Morcombe's. Brett Peter Cowan was convicted of murder in the case.	Murdered	8 years
2003	Joyce Vincent	38	England	British woman last heard from around late 2003. She had cut off contact with most people who she knew. Her corpse was discovered on January 25, 2006, in her flat, Her date of death was around December 2003. The cause of which is unknown, but believed to be a medical condition. Various things (such as partial rent and energy bills being paid or forgiven by social programs, and the foul odour of outside waste bins) led to her body being undiscovered for over two years.	Unknown	2 years

== 2004 ==
Date	Person(s)	Age	Country of disappearance	Circumstances	Outcome	Time spent missing or unconfirmed
2004	Terry Kimball	60	United States	Sometime in 2004, 60-year-old Terry Kimball disappeared from Westminster, Colorado. He was living with his nephew, Scott Lee Kimball, at the time, who was later found to be a serial killer. In July 2009, Scott revealed to the authorities where he had mummified Terry's body in a remote mountain pass near Vail, Colorado. He was told that in exchange for the information he would not face charges for Terry's death. Scott was already serving time for other murders.	Murdered	5 years
2004	Lamduan Armitage	36	England	Armitage was a Thai-born Englishwoman who vanished without a trace sometime in 2004, only for her body to be discovered on the Pen-y-ghent mountain on September 20 of that year. She was initially unidentified until 2019, when DNA testing confirmed her identity. A man has been arrested in connection with her death.	Died (unknown cause)	14 years
2004	Spalding Gray	62	United States	Gray, an American actor, writer and monologist, was declared missing on January 11, 2004. On March 7, 2004, the Office of Chief Medical Examiner of the City of New York reported that Gray's body had been discovered by two men and pulled from the East River. He is said to have committed suicide by drowning himself.	Suicide	2 months
2004	See Sheau Fang	18	Malaysia	See was abducted by Kher Tian Hock, after she was last seen boarding his car to go to tea with him. Kher raped and killed See before he buried her body in cement at the front yard of a friend's house. Kher was arrested a month after the crime, but escaped from the police station and went into hiding for seven years before he was arrested again in October 2011. Kher was sentenced to death in 2015, and remains on death row since 2024 after losing his final appeal.	Murdered	2 weeks
2004	Frédéric Chamard-Boudet	Unknown	Siberia	A Frenchman who disappeared on March 5, 2004, on an expedition to reach the North Pole. Chamard-Boudet was rescued on March 9 after transmitting a distress call.	Found alive	4 days
2004	Perry Saturn	37	United States	American professional wrestler involved in an April 2004 altercation with two men when he came to the aid of a woman who they were raping. He fought the men and was shot in the back of the neck and right shoulder with a .25-caliber handgun, although he originally thought was merely punched during the scuffle. After being shot, Saturn became addicted to methamphetamine and was homeless for two and a half years. Saturn disappeared from public view and was not seen for several years, with his family and friends unaware of his whereabouts. He reemerged in 2010, having resolved his addiction.	Found alive	Unclear
2004	Nick Berg	26	Iraq	Berg was an American freelance radiotower repairman who owned a company based in Mosul, Iraq. In April 2004, during one of his frequent visits to Baghdad, he disappeared mysteriously. About a month later, his decapitated body was found by an overpass, and three days after a discovery, a video surfaced showing an Islamist jihadist group, Muntada al-Ansar, had kidnapped Berg. After forcing him to read a lengthy statement, one of his captors decapitated him with a knife.	Murdered	1 month
2004	Stephen Farrell	42	Iraq	Farrell was a British-Irish journalist who was kidnapped by Sunni extremists in April 2004, while on a work assignment for The Times in Fallujah, Iraq. He was later released without incident.	Found alive	8 hours
2004	Jonathan Coulom	9–10	France	French schoolboy who was abducted from a school summer camp in Saint-Brevin-les-Pins on April 6, 2004. His naked body, which was bound to a cinderblock, was found in a pond in Guérande on May 19. German serial killer and prolific child rapist Martin Ney has been charged in his murder.	Murdered	1 month
2004	Patrice Marie Tamber Endres	38	United States	Hairdresser Patrice Marie Tamber Endres, disappeared from her hair salon, Tamber's Trim ‘N Tan, in Cumming, Georgia, on April 15, 2004, between 11:37 and 11:50 a.m. Her remains were found on December 6, 2005, in Dawson County, Georgia. The serial killer Gary Hilton was known to have been in Forsyth County, because he had been stopped for a traffic violation there. In his statements to investigators, Hilton told them that he would usually go to hair salons to ask for money, usually around lunchtime. Investigators were unable to find an alibi for him on the day of Patrice's disappearance.	Murdered	8 months
2004	Paiche Onyemaechi	25	Ireland	Onyemaechi was the daughter of a Malawian judge who had sought asylum in Ireland with her first husband. Her decapitated remains were discovered in Piltown, County Kilkenny, Ireland, on 23 July 2004. She had been reported missing on 10 July.	Murdered	2 weeks
2004	Dekendra Thapa	33	Nepal	Dekendra Thapa was a Nepali journalist who disappeared on August 11, 2004, from Dailekh District of western Nepal. His deceased body was found four years later buried inside a local forest after he was murdered.	Murdered	4 years
2004	Brooke Wilberger	19	United States	Wilberger was abducted from Corvallis, Oregon, on the morning of May 24, 2004. Her remains were found on September 21, 2009.	Murdered	5 years 4 months
2004	Kim Sun-il	33	Iraq	Kim Sun-il was a South Korean Christian missionary and interpreter working for a company contracted by the American government to work in Iraq. On May 30, 2004, he was kidnapped near Fallujah by the Islamist militant group Jama'at al-Tawhid wal-Jihad and held as a hostage. About a month after his abduction, the group sent a tape to Al Jazeera, which depicted Sun-il being decapitated by one of his captors.	Murdered	1 month
2004	Zhang Hongjie	25	Australia	Chinese University of Canberra communications student said to have disappeared in June 2004, she was found murdered in her flat in Belconnen in January 2005.	Murdered	7 months
2004	Paul Marshall Johnson Jr.	49	Saudi Arabia	An American helicopter engineer stationed at a Lockheed Martin factory in Riyadh, Saudi Arabia who was kidnapped by members of Al-Qaeda in the Arabian Peninsula on June 12, 2004, at a fake checkpoint near Riyadh. Despite calls from the Saudi and American governments for his release, his kidnappers beheaded him in a recorded video, with his head later recovered from a refrigerator in a villa near Riyadh.	Murdered	6 days
2004	Frances Rasuge	27	South Africa	Frances Rasuge, a 27-year-old South African Police Services constable, disappeared in Temba, South Africa, on 27 August 2004. She was last seen in the company of her boyfriend, William Nkuna, at a hairdressing salon. Nkuna was subsequently convicted of murdering Rasuge and was sentenced to life in prison in November 2005. On 20 March 2012, construction workers discovered Rasuge's remains in Nkuna's backyard.	Murdered	7 years
2004	William Burgess Powell	56	United States	Discovered naked and beaten and with severe amnesia on August 31, 2004, at a Burger King in Richmond Hill, Georgia; after efforts from genetic genealogists, his true identity was finally discovered on September 16, 2015. Powell had forgotten his identity and had been living under the name "Benjaman Kyle".	Found alive	39 years
2004	Jin Gyeong-suk	23	China	North Korean defector who was abducted in Jilin, China while filming a documentary about the regime's involvement in the drug trade. She was deported back to North Korea, where she was tortured and later killed at the Chongjin concentration camp.	Murdered	5 months
2004	Cecilia Cubas	30	Paraguay	Daughter of former Paraguayan president Raúl Cubas Grau who was kidnapped by armed gunmen from her home in Asunción on September 21, 2004. Her naked body was later found in an underground chamber, having been buried alive by her captors, who were trained by Colombian terrorist group FARC.	Murdered	5 months
2004	Kenneth Bigley	62	Iraq	Kenneth Bigley was a British civil engineer, who together with his American colleagues Jack Hensley and Eugene Armstrong, was kidnapped by Islamist militants from Jama'at al-Tawhid wal-Jihad in Baghdad, Iraq. Two days after his kidnapping, a video surfaced showcasing the masked militants threatening to execute their captives unless their demands for Iraqi women prisoners were not met. Despite intervention from the British government and the Muslim Council of Britain, Bigley was killed two weeks later, with his decapitation being recorded and posted on the internet. His body was not recovered.	Murdered	2 days
2004	Huang Na	8	Singapore	On October 10, 2004, 8-year-old Huang Na, an international student from China, went missing from Pasir Panjang. A highly publicized three-week search from Singapore to Malaysia ensued. Monetary rewards offered for information on her whereabouts. On October 30, 2004, 23-year-old Malaysian Chinese Took Leng How confessed that he killed Huang Na in a storeroom during a game of hide-and-seek. The body was found in an abandoned box at Telok Blangah the next day, and Took, a close acquaintance of Huang Na and her family, was charged with murder. An autopsy result showed that Huang Na was possibly sexually assaulted. There were suggestions that Took was mentally ill and the girl died of other causes other than murder, but Took was found guilty and sentenced to death. Took's appeal was later dismissed by the three-judge Court of Appeal on a rare split decision of 2 to 1. Took's clemency appeal was turned down, and he was executed on November 3, 2006, by hanging in Changi Prison.	Murdered	21 days
2004	Margaret Hassan	59	Iraq	Hassan was an Irish-Iraqi aid worker associated with Care International, providing many locals with medicine and food. On October 19, 2004, she was kidnapped by an unidentified Islamist militant group in Baghdad, who recorded her execution in a hostage video two weeks after her kidnapping. Her remains have never been recovered, and her killer, architect Ali Lutfi Jassar al-Rawi, escaped from prison in 2010, with his whereabouts still unknown.	Murdered	2 weeks
2004	Roy Hallums	56	Iraq	American contractor who, together with several other men, was kidnapped by 20 masked gunmen from his home in Baghdad, Iraq on November 1, 2004. He and an Iraqi captive were liberated by Delta Force on September 7, 2005.	Found alive	1 year
2004	Anthony Ashley-Cooper, 10th Earl of Shaftesbury	66	France	The Earl of Shaftesbury went missing on 5 November 2004 in France. He was murdered by his wife Jamila M'Barek and her brother.	Murdered	6 months

== 2005 ==
Date	Person(s)	Age	Country of disappearance	Circumstances	Outcome	Time spent missing or unconfirmed
2005	Kenshi Yu	3	Philippines	Yu was kidnapped and held for a P200 million ransom by actor and politician Dennis Roldan, Suzette Wang (Roldan's girlfriend, who had known Yu's mother), and at least 5 others. Roldan was convicted of the crime and sentenced to life in prison.	Found Alive	11 days
2005	Margie Profet	46	United States	An evolutionary biologist who ceased contact with her family in 2002 and was last seen in Cambridge, Massachusetts, in 2005. In May 2012 a friend told her about her "disappearance" and contacted her family. She had been living in an isolated location, suffering from a physical ailment that caused severe pain, and did not realize she was considered "missing".	Found alive	7 years
2005	Reet Kahlon	0 months	Canada	The eldest daughter of serial killer Simmi Kahlon who disappeared shortly after her birth in 2005, and she was found four years later, murdered by her mother.	Murdered	4 years
2005	Giuliana Sgrena	57	Iraq	Italian journalist who was kidnapped by insurgents while working in Baghdad, Iraq on February 4, 2005. She was later safely released, but the subsequent incident involving her caused turmoil between the American and Italian governments.	Found alive	1 month
2005	Christelle Leroy	26	France	On 20 February 2005, Christelle Leroy and her 4-year-old son Lucas went missing in Paris. Christelle's employer and lover Bérenger Brouns was convicted of double murder though the bodies were never found.	Murdered	Bodies never found
2005	Lucas Leroy	4	France	On 20 February 2005, Christelle Leroy and her 4-year-old son Lucas went missing in Paris. Christelle's employer and lover Bérenger Brouns was convicted of double murder though the bodies were never found.	Murdered	Bodies never found
2005	Jessica Lunsford	9	United States	Lunsford was an American girl who was abducted from her home in Homosassa, Florida, in the early morning of February 24, 2005, by John Couey; her body was found three weeks later, buried at the home of Couey's half-sister, who lived within sight of the Lunsford home.	Murdered	3 weeks
2005	Anne-Sophie Girollet	20	France	Girollet was a 20-year-old medical student who disappeared following a dance party in Mâcon on March 19. Her body was found in the Saône River in Mâcon on April 2. She had been sexually assaulted, stabbed in the chest, and strangled.	Murdered	2 weeks
2005	Douglas Wood	64	Iraq	Australian construction engineer who was held hostage while working for an American company in Baghdad, Iraq in May 2005. He was eventually rescued on June 20 by Iraqi security forces.	Found alive	6 weeks
2005	Jenny Nicholl	19	England	Nicholl disappeared from North Yorkshire at the end of June 2005. David Hodgson, a 45-year-old married father of two, who was having an affair with her, was convicted of her murder. She was also seeing Hodgson's older brother, which police say made Hodgson obsessively jealous. He was convicted in February 2008 and sentenced to life with a minimum of 18 years, yet Nicholl's body has never been found.	Murdered	Never found
2005	Phoenix Sinclair	5	Canada	Phoenix Sinclair was a Canadian female child who disappeared on 11 June 2005 from Fisher River Cree Nation, Manitoba. Remains were found on March 18, 2006, in a landfill at Fisher River after she was murdered by her mother and stepfather.	Murdered	9 months
2005	Ashley Marie Parlier	21	United States	A 21-year-old woman murdered in Battle Creek, Michigan by serial killer Harold Haulman on June 12, 2005. Haulman confessed to Parlier's murder in 2021. Although he claimed to have discarded Parlier's body in woodland in Newton Township, her remains were not found.	Murdered	Never found
2005	Jacques Roche	44	Haiti	Haitian journalist and Group of 184 affiliate who was kidnapped and murdered in Port-au-Prince, allegedly by members of the Fanmi Lavalas party, which he opposed.	Murdered	4 days
2005	Ihab el-Sherif	51	Iraq	Egyptian ambassador to Iraq who was abducted by Islamist militants on July 3, 2005, while buying a newspaper in Baghdad. Four days later, a video was posted on the internet in which el-Sherif's captors claimed he was killed for his ties with Israel, and his death was later confirmed by the Egyptian government.	Murdered	4 days
2005	Carol Sumner	61	United States	On July 8, 2005, the married couple were robbed, abducted and murdered by four acquaintances: Alan Wade (18), Michael Jackson (23), Tiffany Cole (23), and Bruce Nixon (18). After being taken from their home in Duval County, Florida, to Charlton County, Georgia, the Sumners were buried alive by Wade and Jackson in a pre-dug grave.	Murdered	8 days
2005	Reggie Sumner	61	United States	On July 8, 2005, the married couple were robbed, abducted and murdered by four acquaintances: Alan Wade (18), Michael Jackson (23), Tiffany Cole (23), and Bruce Nixon (18). After being taken from their home in Duval County, Florida, to Charlton County, Georgia, the Sumners were buried alive by Wade and Jackson in a pre-dug grave.	Murdered	8 days
2005	LaToyia Figueroa	24	United States	American woman of African-American and Hispanic descent reported missing in Philadelphia on July 18, 2005. Her remains were discovered in Chester, Pennsylvania on August 20, 2005. On October 17, 2006, her partner Stephen Poaches was convicted of two counts of first-degree murder for the deaths of Figueroa and her unborn child.	Murdered	1 month
2005	Rubén Omar Romano	47	Mexico	Argentinian–Mexican football player who was kidnapped and held hostage near Xochimilco on July 19, 2005. He was rescued on September 21, 2005, by federal agents, and his kidnapper Omar Sandoval Orihuela was sentenced to 26 years' imprisonment.	Found alive	65 days
2005	Aldo Donegani	77	Italy	On August 1, 2005, the married couple was reported missing from their home in Brescia, Italy. Their dismembered bodies were discovered later that month and their heads were found in 2006. Their nephew Guglielmo Gatti was found guilty of the crime.	Murdered	1 month
2005	Luisa De Leo	61	Italy	On August 1, 2005, the married couple was reported missing from their home in Brescia, Italy. Their dismembered bodies were discovered later that month and their heads were found in 2006. Their nephew Guglielmo Gatti was found guilty of the crime.	Murdered	1 month
2005	Scout Taylor-Compton	16	United States	American actress who went missing on August 12, 2005, in southern California and was found two weeks later. She had run away from home.	Found alive	2 weeks
2005	Alicia Ross	25	Canada	Canadian woman who disappeared from her home in Markham, Ontario, on August 17, 2005. Her body was found on September 21 in a wooded area near Cresswell. Her neighbor, Daniel Sylvester, was later convicted and sentenced to life imprisonment for her murder.	Murdered	1 month
2005	Peter Tobin	59	England	Peter Tobin, a man who had been jailed in 1994 for a sex attack on two girls in Portsmouth, was declared to have breached the terms of his licensed release in November 2005 when police could not trace his location. A warrant was issued for his arrest, and he was on the run for almost a year. He was not discovered until he murdered Angelika Kluk in Glasgow in September 2006.	Found alive	10 months
2005	Taylor Behl	17	United States	VCU student who disappeared on September 5, 2006, while going on a meet-up with a man she had previously dated. That same man, Benjamin Fawley, would later be convicted of her murder and sentenced to 30 years' imprisonment, after her body was found dumped in a ravine a month after she disappeared.	Murdered	1 month
2005	Tara Grinstead	31	United States	Grinstead, a beauty queen and high-school history teacher, vanished after attending a beauty pageant the night before. Suspicion fell on 27-year-old Andrew Haley due to videos he posted, but police revealed they were elaborate hoaxes. A latex glove found outside Grinstead's home revealed DNA, matching Ryan Duke. In 2017, Duke and Bo Dukes (no relation) were arrested and charged with crimes including murder. Dukes told investigators he helped Duke burn the body of a woman Duke accidentally killed in a pecan orchard. However, he recanted the confession. In 2019, Dukes was convicted of concealing the death of another, hindering apprehension of a criminal, tampering with evidence, and making false statements. He was sentenced to 25 years in prison. In 2022, Ryan Duke was found not guilty of malice murder, felony murder, aggravated assault and burglary. He was found guilty for concealing her death and was sentenced to 10 years in prison.	Murdered	14 years
2005	Jennifer Teague	18	Canada	Teenager who disappeared while returning home from a late-night shift at her workplace in Barrhaven, Canada on September 8, 2005. Her body was found ten days later, and pizza worker Kevin Davis was later convicted and sentenced to life imprisonment for her murder.	Murdered	10 days
2005	Harmeet Singh Sooden	32	Iraq	Members of the Christian Peacemaker Teams who were abducted along with two others on November 26, 2005, by the Swords of Righteousness Brigade while in Baghdad, Iraq. While Fox was executed and his body found in a garbage dump on March 10, 2006, Sooden and the others were rescued in a military operation on March 23.	Found alive	4 months
2005	Tom Fox	54	Iraq	Members of the Christian Peacemaker Teams who were abducted along with two others on November 26, 2005, by the Swords of Righteousness Brigade while in Baghdad, Iraq. While Fox was executed and his body found in a garbage dump on March 10, 2006, Sooden and the others were rescued in a military operation on March 23.	Executed	4 months
2005	Norman Kember	74	Iraq	Members of the Christian Peacemaker Teams who were abducted along with two others on November 26, 2005, by the Swords of Righteousness Brigade while in Baghdad, Iraq. While Fox was executed and his body found in a garbage dump on March 10, 2006, Sooden and the others were rescued in a military operation on March 23.	Found alive	4 months
2005	James Loney	41	Iraq	Members of the Christian Peacemaker Teams who were abducted along with two others on November 26, 2005, by the Swords of Righteousness Brigade while in Baghdad, Iraq. While Fox was executed and his body found in a garbage dump on March 10, 2006, Sooden and the others were rescued in a military operation on March 23.	Found alive	4 months
2005	Susanne Osthoff	43	Iraq	German archaeologist who was kidnapped, together with her driver, while en route to Baghdad on November 25, 2005. She was eventually freed on December 18, but her kidnappers have never been positively identified.	Found alive	Less than 1 month
2005	Naomi Miller	34	United States	A woman from Texas, who was reported missing in December 2005, and was found buried underneath the old San Angelo speedway on March 8, 2017. Her ex-husband Robert had faced charges in her death, and both he and his current wife pleaded guilty and were sentenced to 38 years in prison.	Murdered	12 years
2005	Adre-Anna Jackson	10	United States	Jackson disappeared while walking to her school in Lakewood, Washington, in an area reportedly populated by registered sex offenders. Her skeletonized body was later found in a thicket. While the exact cause of death has not been determined, it was deemed suspicious, and the unsolved killing is currently under investigation by the FBI.	Murdered	4 months

== 2006 ==
Date	Person(s)	Age	Country of disappearance	Circumstances	Outcome	Time spent missing or unconfirmed
2006	Philip Morris	Unknown	Nigeria	English oil rig worker kidnapped by Nigerian kidnappers while working on the Aban Pearl. He and several others were held in the jungle for days, before the Nigerian government managed to negotiate their release for $200,000 ransom.	Found alive	4 days
2006	Jill Carroll	29	Iraq	American journalist for The Wall Street Journal kidnapped by Iraqi militants on January 7, 2006. She was held hostage for two months, but freed without harm. She later retired from journalism and became a firefighter.	Found alive	2 months
2006	Chee Gaik Yap	24	Malaysia	Chee and her younger sister were last seen jogging at Sungai Petani, Kedah, Malaysia on the evening of 14 January 2006. While her sister was far behind, Chee was abducted by an unknown person; one of her shoes was left behind. Her sister informed her family and a police report was lodged, leading to a massive search by police and Chee's family and friends. Nine hours after she went missing, Chee was found dead with multiple stab wounds. She had been raped and sodomized before death. The case went unsolved for six years before her killer, Shahril Jaafar, the son of a Datuk businessman, was arrested in January 2012 at the Kuala Lumpur International Airport after arriving from Perth, Australia. Shahril was first acquitted of the crime found guilty of murdering Chee in a retrial and sentenced to death by the Alor Setar High Court in August 2015. Shahril's appeals between 2016 and 2024 were all dismissed, and he remains on death row since.	Murdered	Nine hours
2006	Bobby Äikiä	10	Sweden	Äikiä, a Swedish boy with Fragile X syndrome from Nässjö, Jönköping County, who on January 14, 2006, was tortured and killed by his mother and stepfather, who hid his body. In February 2006 Äikiä's body was found and mother and stepfather were charged with the crime.	Murdered	Over 2 weeks
2006	Banaz Mahmod	20	England	Mahmod, an Iraqi-Kurdish immigrant living in London, was killed by her family members when she refused to engage with a man in a forced marriage. After being raped and tortured for hours, she was strangled and her body stuffed in a suitcase, which the perpetrators buried in a garden in Handsworth, West Midlands. The killers were arrested a month after her murder, and police used phone and vehicle tracking to locate Mahmod's remains.	Murdered	Over 3 months
2006	Ilan Halimi	23	France	Halimi, a French mobile phone salesman working in Paris, was kidnapped by a gang of criminals who believed that all Jewish people were rich. The "Gang of Barbarians", led by Youssouf Fofana, sent threatening messages and ransom letters to family members, demanding payment in exchange for his release. Halimi was tortured during the process and died from his injuries. His captors were later arrested and sentenced to varying terms of imprisonment.	Murdered	Over 2 weeks
2006	Nurasyura binte Mohamed Fauzi	2	Singapore	Nurasyra binte Mohamed Fauzi, affectionately known as "Nonoi," went missing in Singapore on March 1, 2006. She was last seen in her step-grandparents' ground floor flat in Circuit Road. There was a highly publicised three-day search for the girl, with family members, friends, and strangers (including police) participating and distributing flyers. Three days after her disappearance, Nonoi's stepfather Mohammed Ali bin Johari, aged 29, confessed to his wife and mother-in-law that he accidentally drowned her in water, and led the police to where he disposed of the body. He was then charged with murder. Autopsy results showed the girl was sexually assaulted before death; Mohammed Ali denied raping the girl. In August 2007, in a widely reported trial, the High Court of Singapore found 31-year-old Mohammed Ali guilty of murder and sentenced him to death. Mohammed Ali later lost his appeal, and he was hanged on December 19, 2008.	Murdered	3 days
2006	Dana Lowrey	23	United States	Dana Lowrey last contacted her estranged husband in Minden, Louisiana, in May 2006. She had traveled the United States selling magazines and was in Ohio when she last contacted him. Lowrey is believed to be the first victim of serial killer Shawn Grate, who confessed to murdering the victim in 2016. Her remains were found in March 2007 but not identified. Lowrey was identified by the DNA Doe Project in June 2019.	Murdered	10 months
2006	David Sharp	34	China	David Sharp was an English mountaineer who disappeared on May 15, 2006, while climbing Mount Everest in Tibet and his body was recovered a year later.	Hypothermia	1 year
2006	Gilad Shalit	20	Gaza Strip–Israel border	IDF soldier who was captured by Hamas militants during the 2006 Gaza cross-border raid. He was later released as part of a prisoner exchange.	Found alive	5 years
2006	Nathalie Mahy	11	Belgium	Nathalie Mahy and Stacy Lemmens were two Belgian stepsisters who disappeared in the city of Liège on June 10, 2006, and were found murdered on June 28. On June 10, 2008, Abdallah Ait Oud was found guilty by a jury of kidnapping, rape and murder of the children, and sentenced to life imprisonment (which, under the Belgian law, is most of the time not fully served in prison, but later on changed into a suspended sentence).	Murdered	18 days
2006	Stacy Lemmens	7	Belgium	Nathalie Mahy and Stacy Lemmens were two Belgian stepsisters who disappeared in the city of Liège on June 10, 2006, and were found murdered on June 28. On June 10, 2008, Abdallah Ait Oud was found guilty by a jury of kidnapping, rape and murder of the children, and sentenced to life imprisonment (which, under the Belgian law, is most of the time not fully served in prison, but later on changed into a suspended sentence).	Murdered	18 days
2006	Chanel Petro-Nixon	16	United States	Petro-Nixon was an American teenager from Brooklyn, New York, who went missing on June 18, 2006. Her body was discovered on June 22, 2006, in a trash bag in front of 212 Kingston Avenue. It was determined that she had been strangled.	Murdered	4 days
2006	Frauke Liebs	21	Germany	Liebs was a student nurse who disappeared on June 20, 2006, after last being seen at a pub in Paderborn's city center. On October 4, 2006, a hunter found her skeletonized body in a forest near a Landesstraße ("state road") near Lichtenau.	Murdered	14 weeks
2006	Eliyahu Asheri	18	Israel	Asheri was an Israeli student who was kidnapped and later killed by PRC militants on June 25, 2006, while on his way to Neveh Tzuf. His body, buried in an open field near a village, was recovered by IDF forces.	Murdered	4 days
2006	Eldad Regev	25	Israeli–Lebanese border	Israeli soldiers abducted by Hezbollah militants near the Lebanese border, sparking the 2006 Lebanon War. Their bodies were repatriated to Israel in 2008, as part of a prisoner exchange. The Lebanese government claimed that they were killed by Israeli bombing. Israel claims that they were killed by Hezbollah.	Murdered	2 years
2006	Ehud Goldwasser	31	Israeli–Lebanese border	Israeli soldiers abducted by Hezbollah militants near the Lebanese border, sparking the 2006 Lebanon War. Their bodies were repatriated to Israel in 2008, as part of a prisoner exchange. The Lebanese government claimed that they were killed by Israeli bombing. Israel claims that they were killed by Hezbollah.	Murdered	2 years
2006	Destiny Norton	5	United States	Norton had disappeared on July 16, 2006, from Salt Lake City, Utah. Her body was found on July 24, 2006, less than 100 feet from her home in the basement of her neighbor, Craig Roger Gregerson.	Murdered	8 days
2006	Marcus Fiesel	3	United States	Inadvertently killed by his foster parents on August 4–6, 2006, who had kept him locked in the closet. His incinerated remains were found 24 days later in Brown County, Ohio.	Murdered	24 days
2006	Steven Centanni	60	Gaza Strip	A reporter for Fox News kidnapped with colleague Olaf Wiig in the Gaza Strip by Palestinian militants. The kidnappers demanded that all Muslim prisoners in the United States be freed. Although this demand was not met, both were freed after 13 days of captivity after claiming to have converted to Islam. Both later stated they feigned conversion.	Found alive	13 days
2006	Jamshid Karimov	39	Uzbekistan	Uzbekistani investigative journalist who was forcefully interned in a psychiatric hospital on September 12, 2006, for "psychiatric treatment", but the true reason for his detainment is believed to be criticism of the administration of then-President Islam Karimov. He was released in October 2011, but has since been detained again and is currently imprisoned in another psychiatric facility.	Found alive	5 years
2006	Angelika Kluk	23	United Kingdom	Twenty-three-year-old Angelika Kluk, a student from Poland, was last seen alive with a church handyman at St. Patrick's Church in Glasgow. Kluk's body was discovered under the church floorboards on September 29. After a nationwide search, the handyman, who turned out to be missing sex offender Peter Tobin, was found and convicted of Kluk's murder. During investigation Tobin was found to have also murdered Vicky Hamilton and Dinah McNicol, two girls who disappeared in 1991.	Murdered	5 days
2006	Chelvy Thiyagarajah	42-43 (unknown birthdate)	Sri Lanka	Sri Lankan feminist poet and activist abducted by the Liberation Tigers of Tamil Eelam, a militant rebel group. Six years after her abduction, LTTE sources confirmed that Thiyagarajah and another activist had been executed at one of their camps.	Murdered	6 years
2006	Michelle Gardner-Quinn	21	United States	Gardner-Quinn was an undergraduate at the University of Vermont, who was kidnapped on October 7, 2006. Her body was found along a road in the neighboring town of Richmond on October 13, 2006.	Murdered	6 days
2006	Ahmed Kousay al-Taie	40	Iraq	Al-Taie, an Iraqi-born American soldier serving in Baghdad during the Iraq War, was captured by a group of armed militants who held him as a hostage. His fate remained unclear until 2012, when the Iraqi government confirmed that he had been killed in 2008.	Murdered	6 years
2006	Tania Nicol	19	England	19-year-old Tania Nicol, who discreetly worked as a prostitute to fund a drug addiction, disappeared from Ipswich on the night of October 30, 2006. Her body was found in a river on the outskirts of Ipswich on December 8; she had been killed by the serial killer Steve Wright.	Murdered	38 days
2006	Douglas Al-Bazi	34	Iraq	Iraqi Chaldean Catholic Church priest who was kidnapped by an Islamist militant group while serving in Baghdad. He was viciously tortured, but eventually released after a ransom of $170,000 was paid. Since then, Al-Bazi moved to New Zealand and became the parish priest of the St. Addai Chaldean Catholic Church in Papatoetoe, doing political activism on behalf of Christians in the Middle East.	Found alive	9 days
2006	Gemma Adams	25	England	25-year-old Gemma Adams, who turned to prostitution to fund a drug addiction, disappeared from Ipswich on the night of November 15, 2006. Her body was found in a river on the outskirts of Ipswich on December 2, six days before the body of fellow missing Ipswich woman Tania Nichol was found in the same river. Both had been killed by the serial killer Steve Wright.	Murdered	17 days
2006	Anneli Alderton	24	England	Three-months-pregnant Anneli Alderton, who worked as a prostitute, disappeared from Ipswich on the evening of December 3, 2006. She was found in woodland on the outskirts of Ipswich on December 10 when a passing motorist reported seeing her body, three days after another motorist mistook it for a manequin and failed to report it. She had been killed by the serial killer Steve Wright.	Murdered	7 days
2006	James Kim	35	United States	The American TV personality and his family were returning to their home in San Francisco, California, but encountered heavy snow in Oregon, forcing them to change their route. Their vehicle was immobilized, and James later attempted to get help by reaching the nearest town. While his family were later rescued, he died from hypothermia at Big Windy Creek, where his body was found two days later.	Hypothermia	2 days
2006	Annette Nicholls	29	England	29-year-old Annette Nicholls, who worked as a prostitute, disappeared from Ipswich on December 8, 2006. Her body was found alongside fellow missing Ipswich prostitute Paula Clennell in woodland by a road on December 12; both had been killed by the serial killer Steve Wright.	Murdered	4 days
2006	Paula Clennell	24	England	24-year-old Paula Clennell, who discreetly worked as a prostitute, disappeared from Ipswich on the morning of December 10, 2006. Her body was found in woodland by a road on the outskirts of Ipswich on December 12, after a police helicopter spotted her and the body of the missing Ipswich woman Annette Nicholls. Both had been killed by the serial killer Steve Wright.	Murdered	2 days

== 2007 ==
Date	Person(s)	Age	Country of disappearance	Circumstances	Outcome	Time spent missing or unconfirmed
2007	Rochom P'ngieng (allegedly)	c. 24	Cambodia	A mute Vietnamese woman discovered living in Ratanakiri province, Cambodia on January 13, 2007. Initially believed to have lived remotely as a feral child for up to eighteen years, developments in 2016 indicated the woman had disappeared from Vietnam one year prior to her discovery following a mental breakdown at age 23. She later returned to live with her Vietnamese in-laws.	Found alive	1 year
2007	Tara Lynn Grant	34	United States	Grant was from Washington Township, Macomb County, Michigan, and a business consultant, wife, and mother. On February 14, 2007, Grant's husband Stephen reported that she was missing for five days after being picked up in their driveway. On March 2, police discovered Tara's dismembered torso in plastic bags in the garage. Stephen fled to Michigan's Wilderness State Park, apparently intent on committing suicide. He was arrested, and confessed to the murder, saying an argument led him to strangle and dismember her. He was sentenced to 50–80 years in prison.	Murdered	21 days
2007	Erika Hill	15	United States	Erika was an American 15-year-old girl who was murdered in Fitchburg, Wisconsin, in February 2007. Hill's damaged body was found in Gary, Indiana, on February 26, and her identity was not discovered until 2015. Her body was first taken to Chicago and burned, then five days later it was moved to Gary, Indiana. Her adoptive mother Taylin Hill was charged with reckless homicide and later pleaded guilty to reduced charges for which she was sentenced to 20 years' imprisonment.	Murdered	5 days
2007	Alan Johnston	44	Gaza Strip	A British journalist for the BBC stationed in Gaza City, Johnston was kidnapped by Army of Islam militants and held in captivity. Despite several false reports of him being executed, he was freed on July 4 and returned to the UK a few days later.	Found alive	More than 3 months
2007	Edward Chikombo	65–66	Zimbabwe	Zimbabwean journalist for the Zimbabwe Broadcasting Corporation who was killed after sending footage depicting police brutality towards Movement for Democratic Change members to foreign media. Despite outrage over his death, his killers were never caught.	Murdered	Several days
2007	Brittany Jacks	17	United States	Brittany Jacks was last seen in March 2007. She and her three sisters were found dead at their home in January 2008.	Murdered	9 months
2007	Daniele Mastrogiacomo	53	Afghanistan	Italian–Swiss journalist and war correspondent for la Repubblica who was kidnapped while working in Afghanistan on March 7, 2007, by Taliban militants led by Dadullah. He was held hostage, with his abductors demanding Italy withdraw its troops, and was eventually released in exchange for five Taliban prisoners.	Found alive	15 days
2007	Christopher Barrios Jr.	6	United States	Schoolboy who was abducted from his home in Brunswick, Georgia, by a group of four kidnappers on March 8, 2007, who then raped and killed him. His body was found on March 15. The main killer, David Edenfield, was sentenced to death.	Murdered	17 days
2007	Ruby Rose Barrameda-Jimenez	26	Philippines	Barrameda-Jimenez was the sister of Filipino actress and beauty queen Rochelle Barrameda. She disappeared on March 14, 2007, after visiting her children at the house of her estranged husband Manuel Jimenez III's family in Navotas, Metro Manila. Her body was found over two years later on June 10, 2009, in a cemented metal drum in Manila Bay near the Navotas Fish Port based on a tip from Manuel Montero, a suspect in her murder. Montero confessed that she murdered Barrameda-Jimenez upon the order of Jimenez III, his father Manuel Jimenez Jr. and his uncle Lope Jimenez. Driver Eric Fernandez and security officer Lennard Descalso were named as accomplices. On September 30, 2019, the Malabon Regional Trial Court dismissed the parricide case against Jimenez III and the murder case against his father, his uncle and several other accomplices after Montero recanted his testimony and went missing in 2013.	Murdered	2 years, 2 months, 28 days
2007	Lindsay Ann Hawker	22	Japan	Hawker, a 22-year-old English teacher working for Nova in Japan, was reported missing on March 26, 2007, after she did not show up to class that day or the day before. Police went to the apartment of a person of interest in Ichikawa, Chiba, that same day. There, they found Hawker's body buried in a bath of sand. The person of interest, Tatsuya Ichihashi, evaded the police for over two years before being arrested in 2009.	Murdered	1 day
2007	Oralgaisha Omarshanova	39	Kazakhstan	Oralgaisha Omarshanova was a female Kazakh journalist who disappeared March 30, 2007 in Almaty Province, Kazatkom and her remains were discovered in 2021 after she had been killed.	Murdered	14 years
2007	Anne Hendricks Bass	66	United States	Bass was an American investor, art collector and documentary filmmaker who was held hostage at her estate by her butler. She was later rescued, and after a five-year-long trial, he was sentenced to 20 years' imprisonment for the crime.	Found alive	12 hours
2007	Kelsey Smith	18	United States	Smith, an Overland Park, Kansas, teenager, disappeared on June 2, 2007, and was murdered that evening. Smith's body was found in Longview Lake, Missouri, on June 6, 2007. The Kelsey Smith Act was later created in her name.	Murdered	4 days
2007	Paige Birgfeld	34	United States	Paige Birgfeld, a 34-year-old woman from Grand Junction, Colorado, went missing on June 28, 2007. It was discovered that Birgfeld was leading a double life as an escort under the name "Carrie". Her body was found on March 6, 2012. In 2014, Lester Ralph Jones was charged with Birgfeld's kidnapping and murder.	Murdered	4 years, 8 months, 7 days
2007	Felicia Teo Wei Ling	19	Singapore	Felicia Teo, a 19-year-old Singaporean and student of LASALLE College of the Arts, went missing on June 30, 2007, after leaving her friends' flat. Teo was reported missing four days later, and highly publicized search efforts and police investigations ensued. The police investigations lasted 13 years until police reclassified the case as murder in July 2020. Two tenants of the flat, Teo last visited were classified as suspects, but only one, 35-year-old Singaporean Ahmad Danial Mohamed Rafa'ee was arrested and charged with murder. The other suspect, 32-year-old Indonesian Ragil Putra Setia Sukmarahjana, went on the run and was never caught. Ahmad Danial's murder charge was later temporarily stood down and he served 26 months in jail for illegally disposing of Teo's corpse and stealing her belongings.	Murdered	13 years
2007	Maureen Brainard-Barnes	25	United States	One of the confirmed victims of the Gilgo Beach serial killings. Brainard-Barnes, a mother-of-two and occasional sex worker, was last seen alive on July 9, 2007. Her body was discovered in December 2010.	Murdered	3 years
2007	Riley Ann Sawyers	2	United States	Sawyers disappeared from Spring, Texas, on July 24, 2007. Her body was found in Galveston Bay, Texas, on October 29, 2007.	Murdered	3 months
2007	Cédrika Provencher	9	Canada	Provencher was a girl from Trois-Rivières, Quebec, who disappeared on July 31, 2007. The Quebec media believed she was kidnapped. On December 12, 2015, Quebec police announced that her remains were found in Mauricie, Quebec.	Died (unknown cause)	8 years 5 months
2007	Ylenia Lenhard	5	Switzerland	A five-year-old girl from Appenzell, Switzerland, abducted and murdered while bicycling home from a local swimming pool on July 31, 2007. Her body was discovered in woodland close to Oberbüren on September 15. Her murderer, Urs Hans von Aesch, committed suicide on the date of her abduction.	Murdered	7 weeks
2007	Peter Connelly	17 months	United Kingdom	Connelly was a 17-month-old British toddler initially known in the press as "Baby P," who died after eight months of physical and mental abuse during which he was seen by the London Borough of Haringey Children's Services and National Health Service health professionals but his evident trauma was ignored or overlooked.	Murdered	1 day
2007	Corryn Rayney	43 or 44	Australia	Rayney disappeared from Australia about August 7, 2007; her body was found a week later in a clandestine grave in Kings Park, Perth, with no clear cause of death.	Died (unknown cause)	1 week
2007	Nurin Jazlin	8	Malaysia	Jazlin was a Malaysian girl who disappeared in Wangsa Maju, Kuala Lumpur, on the night of August 20, 2007. She was found brutally tortured in front of a shop on September 17, 2007, her body in a gym bag. Her killer(s) was never caught and her murder remains unsolved.	Murdered	1 month
2007	Birendra Shah	55	Nepal	A print and broadcast journalist for the Nepal FM, Dristi Weekly, and Avenues TV in Bara. Shah was kidnapped October 4 or 5, 2007, by Communist Party of Nepal Maoists from Pipara Bazaar, Kalaiya. His body was discovered in a forest on November 8.	Murdered	1 month
2007	John Bryant	80	United States	On October 21, 2007, a retired couple of avid hikers living in Horse Shoe, North Carolina, John Davis “Jack” Bryant, 80, and Irene Woods Bryant, 84, left for a hike through Pisgah National Forest, leaving their parked maroon Ford Escape at the Yellow Gap Road near U.S. Route 276. After not hearing from them for two weeks, family members reported the couple as missing to the Henderson County Sheriff's Office, who promptly launched a search for the Bryants, consisting of more than thirty volunteers, cadaver dogs, and a helicopter. Through examining their phone records, it was learned that John had attempted to call 911 on the day of their disappearance, but the signal was lost, and the call was dropped. On November 10, 2007, the body of Irene Bryant was found. On February 3, 2008, body parts identified as John Bryant were discovered by a hunter. The serial killer Gary Hilton was convicted of the double homicide.	Murdered	4 months
2007	Irene Bryant	84	United States		Murdered	1 month
2007	Steve Fossett	63	United States	Fossett was a famous businessman and record breaking aviator who went missing on September 3, 2007, while flying over the Great Basin Desert. Exactly one year later, in September 2008, a hiker found Fossett's identification cards in the Sierra Nevada Mountains, California, leading shortly to the discovery of the plane's wreckage. The remains of Fossett were two large bones found half a mile from the crash site, probably scattered by wild animals.	Died (Plane crash)	1 year
2007	Rowan Ford	9	United States	Six-year-old Rowan Ford disappeared from her home in Stella, Missouri, and was found deceased six days later in a cave in McDonald County, Missouri, with forensic reports showing that she was raped and strangled to death. Family friend Christopher Leroy Collings and Ford's stepfather David Wesley Spears were charged with raping and murdering Ford. Collings was found guilty of murder and sentenced to death in 2012, while Spears was sentenced to 11 years in prison for endangering the welfare of a child and covering up the crime.	Murdered	6 days
2007	Tony Harris	36	Brazil	An American basketball player from Seattle, Washington, who played professionally in Europe, Asia, and Brazil. Harris was last seen alive on November 4. His body was discovered 50 miles east of Brasília on November 18. He is believed to have died on or about November 9. One of several conflicting reports into Harris's death indicates his body was discovered hanging from a tree.	Died (Unknown cause)	14 days
2007	Michael Scot Louis	27	United States	Michael Scot Louis, 27, a resident of South Daytona, Florida, went missing on November 21, 2007. A few weeks later on December 6, his dismembered remains were found by a fisherman in Ormond Beach, packed in black bags which had been dumped in the Tomoka River. The remains were not immediately connected to Louis, with identification occurring several days later by a lab in California. His head was never located. Authorities have stated that while Gary Hilton remains a suspect in the murder and was in the area at the time, he is not the only one.	Murdered	2 weeks
2007	Cheryl Dunlap	46	United States	On December 3, 2007 Cheryl Hodges Dunlap, a resident of Crawfordville, Florida, did not appear at her church in Tallahassee, where she taught Sunday school. On December 16, 2007, a hunter passing through the woods in the Apalachicola National Forest with his dogs, discovered the decapitated and decomposing body of the victim. The serial killer Gary Hilton was convicted of the murder.	Murdered	13 days

== 2008 ==
Date	Person(s)	Age	Country of disappearance	Circumstances	Outcome	Time spent missing or unconfirmed
2008	Meredith Emerson	24	United States	Hiker who went missing in Chattahoochee–Oconee National Forest while walking her dog. Her headless body was found days later in Cumming, Georgia, and investigations later determined that she was killed by Gary Hilton, a serial killer with at least three previous murders. He was sentenced to life imprisonment for this murder.	Murdered	3 days
2008	Brianna Denison	19	United States	Denison was a college student from Santa Barbara, California, who was abducted on January 20, 2008, from a friend's house in Reno, Nevada. Her body was discovered on February 15, 2008, in a field near a Reno business park after being raped and murdered.	Murdered	26 days
2008	Karissa Boudreau	12	Canada	A twelve-year-old girl murdered by her mother, Penny, in Bridgewater, Nova Scotia. Her body was found on 9 February. Penny Bourdreau claimed she strangled her daughter to conserve her relationship with her boyfriend Vernon Macumber. She was sentenced to life imprisonment with a recommendation of a minimum of 20 years' imprisonment in January 2009.	Murdered	13 days
2008	Diane Chenery-Wickens	48	England	British award-winning make-up artist who was reported missing from her home in Duddleswell, East Sussex on January 24, 2008. A woman walking her dog found her body in Little Horsted, Uckfield, on May 15, 2008. Diane's husband had murdered her after she had found a phone bill that showed calls to a mistress and a gay chatline.	Murdered	4 months
2008	Tariq Azizuddin	56	Afghanistan	Pakistani ambassador to Turkey and Afghanistan who was abducted by Tehrik-i-Taliban terrorists while en route to Kabul on February 11, 2008. He and another hostage were released a few months later, after the government and the terrorists negotiated a deal.	Found alive	3 months
2008	Shannon Matthews	9	England	Matthews is an English girl who was kidnapped in Dewsbury, West Yorkshire, on February 19, 2008. She was found alive and well on March 14, 2008; the "kidnapping" was a scam by her mother and her mother's boyfriend's uncle to fraudulently claim a reward for her return. A drama about the case showed the extent of community involvement in trying to locate Shannon.	Found alive	23 days
2008	Leonid Rozhetskin	41	Latvia	Rozhetskin was a Russian financier and lawyer, who went missing from his village in Jūrmala, Latvia, on March 16, 2008, under suspicious circumstances, and his body was found in 2013.	Died (unknown cause)	5 years
2008	Pippa Bacca	33	Turkey	An Italian performance and feminist artist who disappeared in Gebze, Turkey on March 31, 2008, during an international hitchhiking trip to promote world peace. Her body was discovered in the same city on April 11, 2008.	Murdered	11 days
2008	Wong Ka-mui	16	Hong Kong	16-year-old school dropout Wong Ka-mui, who became a sex worker through a compensated dating network, was reported missing on 29 April 2008, and last seen two days before. Nine days later, following a tip, 24-year-old transport worker Ting Kai-tai was arrested on suspicion of murdering Wong. Ting confessed that he strangled Wong after they had sex in his rented flat, before cutting body into pieces, flushing most flesh down the toilet, and disposing of the head and organs in the ocean. Although Wong's head was never recovered despite extensive search efforts, Ting was found guilty of first-degree murder and preventing the lawful burial of a body, and sentenced to life imprisonment.	Murdered	9 days
2008	Mark Speight	42	England	English television presenter arrested on suspicion of murder relating to the death of his fiancée, model Natasha Collins. While her death was later determined to be a drug overdose, Speight disappeared on April 7, 2008, and was later found hanged near Paddington station. Two suicide notes indicated that he killed himself as he couldn't bear living without his fiancée.	Suicide by hanging	6 days
2008	Tonderai Ndira	33–34	Zimbabwe	Zimbabwean MDC–T activist who was abducted by a group of armed men on May 13, 2008, while campaigning for the 2008 general election. His body was found later that same month, and it has been proposed that he had been killed by a death squad.	Murdered	1 month
2008	Fernando Martí	14	Mexico	Fernando Martí was kidnapped on July 12, 2008, and was found dead inside the trunk of an abandoned car in Mexico City on August 1, 2008.	Murdered	Less than one month
2008	Amanda Lindhout	27	Somalia	Lindhout, a Canadian freelance journalist, and Brennan, an Australian author and photojournalist, were sent to report on events in Mogadishu, Somalia. On August 23, 2008, two days after their arrival, the pair, along with their translator Abdifatah Mohammed Elmi and driver Mahad Isse, were kidnapped by Islamist militants and held hostage. After 15 months, during which they were repeatedly tortured and Lindhout raped, all captives were released.	Found alive	15 months
2008	Nigel Brennan	36	Somalia	Lindhout, a Canadian freelance journalist, and Brennan, an Australian author and photojournalist, were sent to report on events in Mogadishu, Somalia. On August 23, 2008, two days after their arrival, the pair, along with their translator Abdifatah Mohammed Elmi and driver Mahad Isse, were kidnapped by Islamist militants and held hostage. After 15 months, during which they were repeatedly tortured and Lindhout raped, all captives were released.	Found alive	15 months
2008	Amy Yeary	18	United States	A former victim of human trafficking, Yeary disappeared sometime in the summer of 2008, after her mother was unable to drive her back home. On November 23, 2008, Yeary's body was found in Campbellsport, Wisconsin, but went unidentified until 2021. Her killer(s) have not been located thus far.	Murdered	13 years
2008	Sean Langan	43	Afghanistan–Pakistan border	British journalist and documentary filmmaker. Langan was kidnapped along with his translator while filming in the Afghanistan–Pakistan border region. Both were held captive by the Taliban for 12 weeks before their release on June 21, 2008.	Found alive	12 weeks
2008	Caylee Anthony	2	United States	Caylee was reported missing on July 15, 2008, in Orlando, Florida. On December 11, 2008, her skeletal remains were found with a blanket inside a trash bag in a wooded area near the family home. Her mother was accused but acquitted of her murder.	Died by homicide (indeterminate means)	5 months
2008	Reigh Gerhartsreiter	7	United States	A seven-year-old girl kidnapped by her father, Christian Gerhartsreiter, during a supervised custodial visit on 27 July 2008. She was abducted from Back Bay, Massachusetts; she was recovered in Baltimore, Maryland, on 2 August. Gerhartsreiter was convicted of the kidnapping of his daughter, one count of assault and one of battery with a dangerous weapon in June 2009. He was sentenced to four to five years in prison.	Found alive	6 days
2008	Antonina Martynova	23	Russia	Antonina Martynova, who in 2007 was accused of attempting to kill her young daughter, Alisa Fedorova, disappeared in Veliky Novgorod with the child after a jury delivered a guilty verdict and on the eve of her sentencing. Antonina’s case caused a major public outcry: many insisted on her innocence. For 15 years the whereabouts of both were unknown. On 11 April 2024 Antonina was arrested in Stavropol and sentenced to nine years in prison. Her daughter—by then an adult—testified in her defense, and the sentence was replaced with a suspended one; in September Antonina was released.	Found alive	15 years
2008	Alisa Fedorova	4	Russia		Found alive	15 years
2008	Karlie Pearce-Stevenson	20	Australia	Mother and daughter whose remains were found in the Belanglo State Forest, Australia five years apart, and were initially treated as unrelated. Daniel Holdom was later charged and convicted for both of their deaths, and sentenced to two life terms.	Murdered	2 years
2008	Khandalyce Pearce	2	Australia	Mother and daughter whose remains were found in the Belanglo State Forest, Australia five years apart, and were initially treated as unrelated. Daniel Holdom was later charged and convicted for both of their deaths, and sentenced to two life terms.	Murdered	7 years
2008	Lai Ying Xin	16	Malaysia	Xin was a 16-year-old schoolgirl abducted by four youths who murdered her by strangulation before burning her body to destroy the evidence, and extorted a ransom from her family. Lai's abductors were arrested four days later and charged with her kidnapping and murder. In 2011, the ringleader and only adult, Teh Kim Hong, was found guilty of kidnapping and murder and sentenced to death; two accomplices were detained indefinitely while a third individual was acquitted of all charges. The ringleader remained on death row for 13 years before Malaysia repealed the mandatory death penalty. His death sentence was reduced to 40 years' imprisonment and 17 strokes of the cane in May 2024.	Murdered	4 days
2008	David S. Rohde	41	Afghanistan	Journalist for The New York Times who, together with two associates, was kidnapped by Taliban militants on November 10, 2008, while doing research for a book in Afghanistan. His colleagues urged other newspapers not to write anything on the kidnapping in order to maximize his chances of survival, and months later, Rohde and another man escaped.	Found alive	8 months
2008	Robert Fowler	64	Niger	Fowler was a Canadian diplomat and special envoy of the UN who was kidnapped while on a peace mission in Niger. After extensive negotiations, he and several other Western hostages were released.	Found alive	4 months
2008	Ophélie Bretnacher	22	Hungary	Bretnacher, a French exchange student, was last seen alive on security camera footage after leaving a Budapest nightclub early on December 2, 2008. Her handbag, with her phone and personal effects, was found on a bridge over the Danube the following day. Two months later her body was found on Csepel, an island in the river within the city, upstream from the bridge. Despite being unable to identify the cause of death, Hungarian authorities closed the case in 2014. Bretnacher's parents believe she may have been killed, and the French government has opened its own investigation.	Died (unknown cause)	2 months
2008	Ronald Eugene Woodham IV	c. 1 day	United States	An American baby and homicide victim whose body was found off of South Carolina Highway 544, on the outskirts of Conway in Horry County, South Carolina on December 4, 2008. He was abandoned by his mother, Jennifer Sahr, and died of hypothermia. Woodham remained unidentified until March 2020. Sahr was arrested the same month, and pleaded guilty to manslaughter in 2022; she was sentenced to four years' imprisonment.	Hypothermia	11 years

== 2009 ==
Date	Person(s)	Age	Country of disappearance	Circumstances	Outcome	Time spent missing or unconfirmed
2009	Marta del Castillo	17	Spain	17-year-old Marta del Castillo disappeared from home in Seville, Andalusia on January 24, 2009 and was never seen again. Her ex-boyfriend Miguel Carcaño Delgado was convicted of murder without a body in 2011.	Murdered	Never found
2009	Pericles Panagopoulos	73	Greece	Panagopoulos, a Greek shipping magnate who owned multiple companies, was kidnapped by armed men in Athens in 2009. Orchestrated by crime boss Panagiotis Vlastos, the group demanded €30 million in ransom, and after a week, they released Panagopoulos after the sum was paid. It is reportedly the highest ransom ever paid.	Found alive	More than 1 week
2009	Heather Strong	26	United States	Strong was abducted and murdered by her estranged husband, Joshua Fulgham, and his girlfriend Emilia Carr on February 15, 2009. Her body was discovered in a shallow grave by a storage trailer in Boardman, Florida, on March 19. Both were later sentenced to life imprisonment without the possibility of parole.	Murdered	1 month
2009	Two younger daughters of Simmi Kahlon	0 months	Canada	The girls were born in the summer of 2009. Their mother Simmi Kahlon murdered them months after their birth.	Murdered	1 to 3 months
2009	Michael Gilbert	26	United Kingdom	After meeting James Watt in a children's home, Gilbert was invited to live with him at his parents' house, where all family members, including Watt, abused, extorted and made him work in slavish conditions. Gilbert was eventually killed, his body dismembered and the remains thrown in a lagoon, with various parts found between May 2009 and February 2010. All six Watt family members were eventually convicted of the killing and received various sentences.	Murdered	1 year
2009	John Solecki	49	Pakistan	Head of the UNHCR, based in Quetta, Pakistan, who was tasked with aiding Afghan refugees in Balochistan. On February 2, 2009, he was kidnapped by BLUF militants and held for two months, before being released.	Found alive	2 months
2009	Gerry Rafferty	61	England	Scottish singer-songwriter, who was reported as having been missing for seven months in February 2009, having disappeared from St Thomas' Hospital in London, where he was being treated for liver failure. Later that month, The Guardian reported that Rafferty had been found, and was described as living "in hiding" in the south of England.	Found alive	7 months
2009	Gerrit-Jan van Dorsten	57	Netherlands	A family who disappeared after March 2009 was discovered living a seclusional lifestyle within a farm house in a village in the Dutch province of Drenthe in October 2019. Van Dorsten had forced his family into seclusion after believing the outside world was unclean.	Found alive	10 years
2009	van Dorsten's six children	16-25	Netherlands	A family who disappeared after March 2009 was discovered living a seclusional lifestyle within a farm house in a village in the Dutch province of Drenthe in October 2019. Van Dorsten had forced his family into seclusion after believing the outside world was unclean.	Found alive	10 years
2009	Jeffrey Howe	49	England	British businessman Jeffrey Howe was last seen on March 8, 2009, in Southgate, London. Between March and April 2009 members of the public found various body parts later identified as belonging to Howe scattered around Hertfordshire and Leicestershire, leading to the press calling him the "Jigsaw man". Howe was killed by his friend Stephen Marshall, who intended to steal his identity and steal from him. At trial he claimed to have dismembered four other bodies between 1995 and 1998 in gangland killings.	Murdered	46 days
2009	Sandra Cantu	8	United States	Cantu was an American girl from Tracy, California, who attracted national attention after she went missing on March 27, 2009. Her body was discovered two weeks later inside a suitcase in a nearby irrigation pond.	Murdered	2 weeks
2009	Abraham Shakespeare	42	United States	A Florida Lottery winner from Plant City, Florida who won a $30 million lottery jackpot went missing in April 2009. The alert for his disappearance was made by his family in November 2009. His body was found in January 2010 buried in the backyard of an acquaintance Dorice "Dee Dee" Moore who was convicted of his murder.	Murdered	9 months
2009	Tori Stafford	8	Canada	Tori Stafford was a Canadian girl from Woodstock, Ontario, who on April 8, 2009, was kidnapped, raped and killed. On July 21, 2009, Stafford's body was found in Mount Forest, Ontario.	Murdered	Less than two months
2009	Brittanee Drexel	17	United States	Brittanee Drexel was an American girl from Chili, New York, who was kidnapped, raped, and murdered between April 25–26, 2009, in Myrtle Beach, South Carolina. Remains located Georgetown, South Carolina, on May 11, 2022, were identified as Brittanee's on May 15. A registered sex offender seen as a person of interest in the case was arrested and charged with the crime.	Murdered	13 years, 16 days
2009	Minna Nurminen	26	Finland	Nurminen, a 26-year-old member of the wealthy Herlin family, disappeared from her home in Etu-Töölö, Helsinki, on 27 May 2009. She was reported missing on 30 May and found alive in a forest in Rusko on 13 June. The kidnapper was identified as Juha Turunen, a former SDP city council candidate living in Turku, who is believed to have abducted Nurminen solely for ransom of eight million euro.	Found alive	2 weeks
2009	Mark Sanford	49	United States	The Republican South Carolina Governor disappeared on June 18, 2009, and reappeared on June 24 six days later.	Found alive	6 days
2009	Typhaine Taton	5	France	French child who was repeatedly abused by her stepfather and mother, Nicolas Willot and Anne-Sophie Faucheur, at their home in Maubeuge. Taton was reported missing on June 18, 2009, by Faucheur, who later confessed that she and Willot killed her and dumped her body in Loverval, Belgium. The body was discovered on December 9, with Willot and Faucheur being convicted and sentenced to 30 years each for the murder.	Murdered	6 months
2009	Susan Rushworth	43	England	Bradford sex worker Rushworth was last seen near her flat in the city on June 22, 2009. Her family made repeated public appeals for her return. In 2010, it was discovered that she was a victim of serial killer Stephen Griffiths, who went on to kill two other sex workers in 2010. Griffiths told police he killed Rushworth and her blood was found in his flat, but her body was never found. On December 21, 2010, Griffiths was convicted of Rushworth's murder and those of the two other women.	Murdered	Never found
2009	Zainab Shafia	19	Canada	Four members of an Afghan-Canadian family were murdered in Kingston, Ontario on June 30, 2009. Sometime after they were reported missing, the Shafia sisters and their father's first wife Rona Muhammad Omar were found dead in a car submerged underwater. Their father Mohammad Shafia, his second wife and son were arrested on suspicion for causing their death. All three were found guilty of first-degree murder and jailed for life.	Murdered	1 day
2009	Sahar Shafia	17	Canada	Four members of an Afghan-Canadian family were murdered in Kingston, Ontario on June 30, 2009. Sometime after they were reported missing, the Shafia sisters and their father's first wife Rona Muhammad Omar were found dead in a car submerged underwater. Their father Mohammad Shafia, his second wife and son were arrested on suspicion for causing their death. All three were found guilty of first-degree murder and jailed for life.	Murdered	1 day
2009	Geeti Shafia	13	Canada	Four members of an Afghan-Canadian family were murdered in Kingston, Ontario on June 30, 2009. Sometime after they were reported missing, the Shafia sisters and their father's first wife Rona Muhammad Omar were found dead in a car submerged underwater. Their father Mohammad Shafia, his second wife and son were arrested on suspicion for causing their death. All three were found guilty of first-degree murder and jailed for life.	Murdered	1 day
2009	Rona Muhammad Omar	52	Canada	Four members of an Afghan-Canadian family were murdered in Kingston, Ontario on June 30, 2009. Sometime after they were reported missing, the Shafia sisters and their father's first wife Rona Muhammad Omar were found dead in a car submerged underwater. Their father Mohammad Shafia, his second wife and son were arrested on suspicion for causing their death. All three were found guilty of first-degree murder and jailed for life.	Murdered	1 day
2009	Marina Sabatier	8	France	An 8-year-old girl murdered by her parents.	Murdered	1 month
2009	Maureen Brainard-Barnes	24	United States	A victim of the Gilgo Beach serial killings. Barthelemy was a 24-year-old Bronx-based sex worker who was last seen alive on 12 July 2009. Her body was discovered on 10 December 2011.	Murdered	2 years 6 months
2009	Paula Hounslea	37	England	Hounslea was a 37-year-old British woman who disappeared from her home in West Derby on 22 August 2009. On 5 May 2012, her burnt remains were found on a disused railway line in Liverpool. Her murder remains unsolved.	Murdered	3 years
2009	Annie Le	24	United States	American doctoral student at the Yale School of Medicine's Department of Pharmacology, who disappeared on September 8, 2009, and was found dead on September 13, 2009, in the building where she worked.	Murdered	5 days
2009	Mitrice Richardson	24	United States	Richardson was an American woman from Calabasas, California, who disappeared on September 17, 2009, after her release from police custody; her body was found on August 9, 2010.	Died (unknown cause)	11 months
2009	Bobby Jamison	44	United States	The Jamison family of Eufaula, Oklahoma were last seen alive on their home surveillance system packing their vehicle and leaving their home on October 8, 2009, appearing to be in a "trancelike" state. Their pickup truck was found abandoned in Latimer County, Oklahoma, a few days later. Their heavily decomposed skeletal remains were discovered by hunters in November 2013, and were confirmed to belong to the Jamisons on July 3, 2014.	Died (unknown cause)	4 years and 1 month
2009	Sherilynn Jamison	40	United States	The Jamison family of Eufaula, Oklahoma were last seen alive on their home surveillance system packing their vehicle and leaving their home on October 8, 2009, appearing to be in a "trancelike" state. Their pickup truck was found abandoned in Latimer County, Oklahoma, a few days later. Their heavily decomposed skeletal remains were discovered by hunters in November 2013, and were confirmed to belong to the Jamisons on July 3, 2014.	Died (unknown cause)	4 years and 1 month
2009	Madyson Jamison	6	United States	The Jamison family of Eufaula, Oklahoma were last seen alive on their home surveillance system packing their vehicle and leaving their home on October 8, 2009, appearing to be in a "trancelike" state. Their pickup truck was found abandoned in Latimer County, Oklahoma, a few days later. Their heavily decomposed skeletal remains were discovered by hunters in November 2013, and were confirmed to belong to the Jamisons on July 3, 2014.	Died (unknown cause)	4 years and 1 month
2009	Morgan Dana Harrington	20	United States	American Virginia Tech student, who disappeared from the John Paul Jones Arena on October 17, 2009, while attending a Metallica concert at the University of Virginia (UVA) in Charlottesville. Her body was discovered on January 26, 2010.	Murdered	3 months
2009	Jill Stuchenko	35	Canada	The first victim of serial killer Cody Legebokoff. Stuchenko was a 35-year-old mother of six reported missing by her family on October 22, 2009. Her body was found close to Prince George, British Columbia, six days later.	Murdered	6 days
2009	Elizabeth Olten	9	United States	Nine-year-old Elizabeth Olten was murdered by her 15-year-old neighbor Alyssa Bustamante, who lured Olten into the woods before strangling and stabbing her to death. Bustamante subsequently pleaded guilty to second-degree murder and armed criminal action and was sentenced to life in prison plus 30 years.	Murdered	2 days
2009	Shaniya Nicole Davis	5	United States	Davis was reported missing by her mother, Antionette Nicole Davis, on November 10th, 2009. Unbeknownst to family and authorities, Antoinette had previously sold her daughter for $200 to pay off her drug debt, and the buyer, Mario Andrette McNeill, subsequently raped and murdered Shaniya. McNiell was charged with Shaniya's murder while Antionette was charged with human trafficking, among other charges.	Murdered	6 days
2009	Larry Ely Murillo-Moncada	25	United States	Disappeared after leaving his family home in Council Bluffs, Iowa on November 28, 2009, while suffering from hallucinations. His body was discovered behind a supermarket freezer unit almost 10 years later on January 24, 2019. His death was ruled an accident.	Accidental death	10 years

== See also ==
- Lists of solved missing person cases
