= Mahy =

Mahy may refer to:

- Barry Mahy (1942–2020), football player
- Margaret Mahy (1936–2012), New Zealand children's author
- Nathalie Mahy (1995 – c. 2006), child murdered along with her step sister by Abdallah Ait-Oud
- Nicolás Mahy (1757–1822), Spanish military commander
- Thomas de Mahy, marquis de Favras (1744–1790), French aristocrat
- Thomas Henry Mahy (1862–1936), newspaper columnist
