= Gloria Polanco =

Colombian First Lady of Huila Department

First Lady of Huila
- In office 1995–1997
- Preceded by: Ninoska de Ortiz
- Succeeded by: Liliana Vázquez

Personal details
- Born: Teruel, Huila, Colombia
- Other political affiliations: Movimiento de Integración Conservadora
- Spouse: Jaime Lozada Perdomo
- Children: Juan Sebastián Lozada Polanco; Jaime Felipe Lozada Polanco; Daniel Julián Lozada Polanco

Gloria Polanco is a Colombian woman and former First Lady of the Huila Department as wife of then Governor of Huila Jaime Lozada Perdomo. She rose to prominence in after being kidnapped in 2001 by the FARC-EP along with two of her sons and other members of her building. During captivity she was elected Member of the Colombian Chamber of Representatives and placed in a list of high-profile kidnapped victims held by the FARC in hopes to have a prisoner exchange. She was finally released on February 27, 2008, along with three other high-profile hostages.

== Captivity and election ==
Shortly after Polanco and her sons were kidnapped in 2001, her husband Jaime Lozada Perdomo tried in vain to negotiate with the FARC, but after six months of futile attempts he chose to inscribe his wife as a candidate for the seat he was trying to run in Congress under the affiliation of the Movimiento de Integración Conservadora, a conservative political party he had founded. By doing this, he hoped to raise her profile as a political hostage and give his family a better chance to be freed in a political prisoner exchange. His plan worked, Gloria Polanco was elected with 28,742 votes becoming the only kidnapped politician to win an election of the sort. Her victory was credited to her work with the needy as First Lady of Huila.

Although Polanco was Representative Elect to the Chamber for the constituency of Huila, she was not able to take office because of her captivity and was substituted by Carlos Ramiro Chavarro in her absence. Regardless of her appointment, she was treated as a political hostage, and her kidnap became a high priority for the Colombian Government. The FARC also changed her condition to that of a high-profile hostage, which to her dismay, led to being separated from her sons who were also hostages. She was moved to another camp where other political hostages were being held. Her two sons were finally freed after her husband Jaime Lozada agreed to pay off their ransom. Lozada was later killed during an attack by the FARC in 2005, which also left Polanco's oldest son injured. It is believed that Lozada was killed because he still owed the FARC ransom money.

== See also ==
- List of kidnappings
- List of solved missing person cases (2000s)
