= Murder of Destiny Norton =

2006 murder in Salt Lake City

Destiny Norton
- Born: November 30, 2000
- Died: July 16, 2006 (aged 5); Salt Lake City, Utah, U.S.

Destiny Anne Norton (November 30, 2000 – July 16, 2006) was a Salt Lake City, Utah, child who was kidnapped and murdered by a neighbor in 2006.

== Murder ==
Until her death, Norton lived in Salt Lake City, Utah. On July 16, 2006, she disappeared from her home. Her body was found fewer than 100 feet from her home in the basement of her neighbor, 20-year-old Craig Roger Gregerson.

She was last seen as she left her home after arguing with her parents about taking a bath.

Volunteers posted missing posters throughout Salt Lake City, describing her as having blonde hair, green eyes, several capped teeth, and dressed in a grey shirt with black stripes.

== Investigation ==
After a massive eight-day search by about 5,000 community volunteers, FBI and police, Destiny's body was found on July 24, 2006, less than 100 feet from her home in the basement of her neighbor, 20-year-old Craig Roger Gregerson. The search effort, led by Salt Lake City Police Chief Chris Burbank, was widely praised for its scale and community involvement. Family and friends were initially outraged after the search ended, and accused authorities of mishandling the investigation. In response, Chief Burbank acknowledged the emotional toll of the tragedy and emphasized the dedication of all those involved in the search. An apology on behalf of the family and friends was later issued in a press conference, expressing gratitude to law enforcement for their efforts.

== Aftermath ==
Gregerson was formally charged on July 27, 2006, with kidnapping and aggravated murder. He waived his rights to a speedy trial, and later waived his rights to a preliminary hearing which had originally been scheduled for October 3 and 4, 2006. In a plea bargain to avoid the death penalty, he pleaded guilty to capital murder and child kidnapping on December 4, and was sentenced to life in prison without parole for the murder, and 15 years to life for the kidnapping. The sentences will be served consecutively.

The Destiny Search Project was formed in 2007, was incorporated as a non-profit in 2008, and operated for several years; its website went offline sometime in 2019. In Utah, operations included searches for missing persons cases such as Camille Cleverley (who disappeared while hiking), Hser Ner Moo (who was discovered having been murdered), and Susan Powell (who disappeared and was presumed murdered by her husband).

== See also ==
- List of solved missing person cases (2000s)
- Murder of Erica Parsons
