= Tony Harris (basketball, born 1970) =

American basketball player (1970–2007)

- Born: Tony Lee Harris; November 18, 1970; Seattle, Washington, U.S.
- Died: November 9, 2007 (aged 36); Brasília, Brazil
- Occupation: Basketball player
- Known for: Mysterious disappearance and death

Tony Lee Harris (November 18, 1970 – c. November 9, 2007) was an American basketball player from Seattle, Washington, who played professionally in Asia, Europe, and Brazil. In 2007, Harris was reportedly found dead in Brazil, after disappearing two weeks earlier.

== Biography ==
Harris attended Garfield High School in Seattle and played for Washington State University. While at Garfield, his team made the state finals, and, while at WSU, the team reached the east regionals of the NCAA tournament.

After working as a counselor in Seattle, he returned to Brazil in 2007 to play for Universo BRB, a basketball team in the capital of Brazil, Brasília. His wife last heard from him on November 4, when he was apparently trying to take a taxi from one city to another. Brazilian media reported that teammates said he was acting strangely and he was said to have been sighted in Bezerra, a city near Brasília, on foot and asking for money. Brazilian wire service EFE reported that he took a taxi to Goiânia, then another taxi to the state of Rio Grande do Norte. Somewhere in Bahia, though, he jumped from the moving vehicle and ran off. Another account had him disappearing while the driver refueled, leaving his luggage in the vehicle.

== Discovery of body and aftermath ==
According to the wire service, he had shown "mental imbalances", and claimed that other teammates were harassing him. His wife reported that he had "feared for his life" and told her of rumors "involving himself", and though he wanted to leave the country, his passport was in custody of team management. She also said that his credit card issuer had reported several unsuccessful attempts to use his card.

On November 18, 2007, officials from the U.S. Federal Bureau of Investigation reported that his body had been found in an "outdoor location" some 50 miles (80 km) east of Brasília; later reports specified Formosa in the state of Goiás. He was said to have been found with a shoelace wrapped around his neck, and one report said he was hanging from a tree. Other reports indicated he was in a vacant lot in the city.

Harris' wife's, stepfather and a friend had traveled to Brazil before the body was found.

== See also ==
- List of solved missing person cases (2000s)
- List of unsolved deaths
