= Murder of Naomi Miller =

2005 murder in Texas

Naomi Miller
- Born: 1971
- Disappeared: 2005 (aged 34); Texas
- Status: found buried underneath the San Angelo speedway on March 8, 2017
- Children: 2

Naomi Michelle Miller was an American woman from Texas who disappeared in 2005, and was found buried underneath the old San Angelo speedway on March 8, 2017.

== Disappearance ==
Miller went missing in 2005, but was not reported missing until December 2015. Her relatives have said that she "just took off" after a family fight one night, which Tom Green County Sheriff David Jones announced during a press conference with local media. He also stated that none of her personal or banking records indicated any activity.

== Investigation and aftermath ==
The first suspect in the death of Miller was her ex-husband Robert Miller, and the police also arrested a second suspect in the death named LuDonna Gail Yoder, the girlfriend of Robert Miller who said that she disposed of Miller's body the night that she was murdered in a shallow grave at Miller's previous house, which was in Tom Green County.

Her ex-husband Robert faced charges in her death, and both he and his current wife named LuDonna Miller (also known as LuDonna Gail Yoder) pleaded guilty and were sentenced to 38 years in prison.

== See also ==
- List of kidnappings (2000–2009)
- List of solved missing person cases (2000s)
