= Birendra Shah =

Nepali print and broadcast journalist

- Born: Inarwasira
- Disappeared: October 4/5, 2007; Pipara Bazaar, Kalaiya, Bara, Nepal
- Status: Killed
- Body discovered: November 8, 2007
- Occupation: Journalist
- Employer(s): Nepal FM, Dristi Weekly, and Avenues TV
- Spouse: Umarawati Devi
- Children: Bibek Shah
- Parent: Deven Shah

Birendra Shah (Nepali: बीरेन्द्र शाह) (Unknown – November 8, 2007) was a print and broadcast journalist for the Nepal FM, Dristi Weekly, and Avenues TV in Bara, Nepal. Shah was kidnapped October 4/5, 2007, by Communist Party of Nepal Maoists from Pipara Bazaar, Kalaiya, Bara, Nepal, and found dead one month later. The CPN(M) later issued a statement confirming his death.

== Personal ==
Married to Umarawati Devi with two children.

== Death ==
Kalaiya, in the Bara district, is located in Nepal and shown relative to the capital Kathmandu.

Shah was kidnapped after exposing the Maoists and connections to illegal logging deals. Three members of the Maoists abducted Shah, took him to a forest, and then shot him to death same day he was kidnapped.

== Context ==
Shah exposed illegal logging deals related to the Maoists. Before his death, he had written several reports about the Maoists which resulted in many threats from the party. They abducted and killed him the same day in a forest and threw his body in a swampy forest. Members of Maoist first denied the abduction and killing of the journalist but then after a month admitted to the killing. The abduction and killing was part of a "personal vendetta".

== Impact ==
Shah has been given a television journalism award in his memory from Avenues Television production.

== Reactions ==
His death drew criticism from several press freedom organizations, including Reporters Without Borders, the Committee to Protect Journalists, and the International Federation of Journalists. There were multiple calls for justice and a nationwide protest.

More than a month after the killing, Maoist Deputy Commander Janardan Sharma Prabhakar apologized on behalf of his party, which had previously claimed innocence.

== See also ==
- List of kidnappings
- List of solved missing person cases (2000s)
