= Murder of Nikole Bakoles =

Unsolved 2000 murder case in Utah

Nikole Bakoles
- Born: Nikole Kristina Bakoles; August 23, 1980; Washington, U.S.
- Disappeared: March 15, 2000 (aged 19)
- Died: c. 2000; Near Salt Lake City, Utah, U.S.
- Cause of death: Homicide
- Body discovered: October 8, 2000
- Other name: Saltair Sally

Nikole Kistina "Niki" Bakoles (August 23, 1980 – c. 2000), also known during the period she remained unidentified as Saltair Sally, was an American woman whose remains were discovered near Salt Lake City, Utah, in October 2000. Although her identity was confirmed in 2012, her death remains an unsolved case.

== Background ==
Nikole Bakoles was born on August 23, 1980, in Washington state. In 1998, she moved to Utah with her boyfriend, Joel Chaudoin, and the couple had a daughter. Bakoles's family described her as a creative, free-spirited young woman who enjoyed being a mother and took part in artistic pursuits such as poetry and painting.

After Bakoles and Chaudoin lost custody of their daughter, communication with her family became infrequent. She was last seen in March 2000 following an argument with Chaudoin; he claimed he left after the dispute and did not see her again. Her family did not immediately report her missing, believing she might have needed space due to the personal challenges she was facing. The family eventually filed a missing person's report in 2003.

In the time leading up to her disappearance, Bakoles allegedly faced difficulties including legal issues and was reportedly being evicted from her apartment. These issues coincided with the loss of custody of her daughter.

== Discovery and identification ==
On October 8, 2000, two duck hunters discovered skeletal remains in a field near the Great Saltair concert venue. Investigators recovered a skull with waist-length blond hair and 26 other bones. Clothing items, including a shirt and a blue choker necklace, were also found near the remains.

For nearly 12 years, the remains were unidentified. In 2012, investigators utilized forensic technology, including stable isotope ratio mass spectrometry (SIRMS), to analyze the isotopic composition of her hair. The signatures revealed that the victim had traveled between Utah and the Pacific Northwest in the months leading up to her death. This analysis, combined with DNA testing, led to a match with the Bakoles family in Washington state. On August 7, 2012, law enforcement publicly announced the identification.

== Current status ==
Although the remains were identified, the specific cause of Bakoles's death has not been released, and the case remains classified as an unsolved homicide. In 2012, an individual claiming responsibility for the killing placed an anonymous untraceable call to authorities, but provided no details.

Law enforcement has questioned Joel Chaudoin, though he has not been named a suspect. Chaudoin was serving time in prison in Washington for unrelated crimes when police interviewed him in 2012. Police continue to urge anyone with information regarding Bakoles or Chaudoin between January and June 2000 to come forward.

== Legacy and folklore ==
The story of Nikole Bakoles, or "Saltair Sally", became part of local folklore surrounding the Great Salt Lake. Some locals have claimed to see her ghost walking near the southern shores of the lake.

The television series Ghost Adventures featured an episode titled "The Great Saltair Curse", which aired on July 22, 2021. The episode focused on the Great Saltair, a century-old music venue near the Great Salt Lake, and explored local beliefs that the venue and surrounding land might be haunted by the spirit of "Saltair Sally" and other alleged apparitions.

== See also ==
- List of solved missing person cases (2000s)
- List of unsolved murders
