= Murder of Fernando Martí =

2008 child murder in Mexico City

Fernando Martí
- Born: Fernando Martí Haik; 1994; Mexico
- Died: July 2008 (aged 13–14); Mexico City, Mexico
- Cause of death: Homicide
- Known for: Kidnapping and subsequent murder

Fernando Martí Haik (c. 1994–2008) was the 14-year-old son of a wealthy sporting goods chain owner Alejandro Martí, whose kidnapping and murder caused a national outrage in Mexico, with some hoping that involvement of such a wealthy family might help draw attention to the issue. The murder was notable for its implication of mid-level law enforcement officials in Mexico City.

== Kidnap and murder ==
Martí was driven in an armored BMW with a bodyguard to the British American School on June 4, 2008, when he was stopped at a roadblock by officers wearing uniforms of Mexico's Federal Investigations Agency, the equivalent of the United States' Federal Bureau of Investigation. The driver was tortured by having his teeth pulled out and later killed, and the bodyguard was choked. The bodyguard survived and later implicated law enforcement, including Jose Luis Romero, commander of the detective unit at Mexico City International Airport. On July 12, 2008, the ransom of 5,135,000 pesos (about US$404.3K) was agreed, but initially the official information was that a total of US$6 million was paid by all the Martí family. After several days of waiting on August 1, 2008, the body of Fernando Martí was found inside the trunk of a car that was left abandoned in the city. The case prompted public outrage in Mexico, and there was growing pressure to reintroduce capital punishment.

== Criminal Investigation ==
On June 17, 2009, the Subprocuraduría de Investigación Especializada en Delincuencia Organizada (SIEDO), which specializes on criminal organized gangs, initiated an investigation for organized delinquency and kidnapping against the organization of La Flor (The Flower), thought to be responsible for the kidnapping and murder of Fernando Martí Haik.

On October 18, 2010, Alejandro Martí, now president of Mexico SOS, published photos of the alleged criminals. By the time he did so, the "Procuraduria General de la Republica" (PGR) announced that $15,000,000 (about US$1,181,000) would be paid as a reward to anyone who could provide reliable and useful information that contributes to the location, arrest or detention of these criminals. Alejandro Martí declared:

Los ciudadanos podemos hacer una importante contribución a través de la denuncia de actos ilícitos o actividades sospechosas que ocurran en nuestras colonias porque de esa forma nos convertiremos en una poderosa fuerza que obligará a las autoridades a actuar con rapidez.

(We the citizens can make an important contribution though the delation of illicit acts or suspicious activities that may occur in our neighborhoods, hence we become a powerful force that will obligate the authorities to act quickly enough.)

== See also ==
- List of kidnappings
- List of solved missing person cases (2000s)
- List of unsolved murders (2000–present)
