= Murder of Marina Sabatier =

2009 death; French judicial and administrative affair

Marina Sabatier
- Born: February 27, 2001; France
- Died: August 7, 2009 (aged 8); France
- Cause of death: Murder by child abuse
- Resting place: Cremated

The Marina affair is a French judicial and administrative affair connected with the death of Marina Sabatier in France in August 2009, at the age of 8 years, as a result of the abuse inflicted by her two parents Éric Sabatier and Virginie Darras, and at the end of a life of maltreatment suffered by the child.

At the end of a trial in June 2012 in the Court of Assizes of the French department the Sarthe, the parents were sentenced to 30 years imprisonment, without possibility of parole for a period of 20 years, for acts of torture and barbarity on Marina over a duration of approximately 6 years that led to their daughter's death. The couple, moving frequently to complicate investigations, concealed violence on Marina by systematic untrue statements on the origin of the girl's injuries, and were even helped by Marina, who, like many abused children, continued despite everything to love her parents and never denounced them.

Going beyond the direct responsibility of both parents, major questions were asked on the efficacy and responsibility of different public departments in France for child abuse prevention, which, despite many warning signals transmitted by persons having had direct contact with Marina, did not prevent the little girl's death.

== Résumé of Marina's maltreatment ==
Marina Sabatier was the daughter of Éric Sabatier and Virginie Darras. An unwanted child, she was born on 27 February 2001 and taken into care, but was retrieved by her mother one month later, who re-established a relationship with Éric Sabatier after a separation had begun during pregnancy. Virginie Darras already had a son by another union, and, after the birth of Marina, would eventually have a total of 4 other children with Éric Sabatier.

The violence inflicted on Marina began from an early age. Marina had a crooked finger since about 1 year of age, supposedly due to a fall from her high chair. Over several years and until the fateful night of August 2009, Marina was a maltreated child. Only Marina underwent cruel and inhuman treatment; the other children of the family were spared this abuse. Marina's parents regularly kicked her, punched her, lashed her with belts and iron bars, and inflicted other numerous methods of torture, such as cold showers, holding her head under water in the bathtub, forcing her to eat salt, vinegar and vomit, and starving her for several days at a time. They imposed punishments such as making her walk barefoot over rough ground carrying a heavy bag, and sometimes gagged or fastened her to her bed with duct tape.

In 2006, Darras' sister became worried after witnessing the beatings inflicted on her niece. Marina's grandmother contacted the maltreatment hotline but was unable to convince staff that her report was serious.

In 2007, at Marina's school of Parennes in the Sarthe region of France, teachers suspected maltreatment and informed the school doctor who after meeting Éric Sabatier detected no problem and believed the father's explanations of a mysterious genetic disease.

After a move in May 2008, the family arrived in Saint-Denis-d'Orques. The school headmistress received information about suspicions of abuse from Marina's old school. The headmistress, joined in her efforts by the school doctor, rapidly pointed out Marina's case to the social services unit of the public prosecutor's office.

An investigation was opened and in July 2008, during a meeting with a medical examiner who had counted more than 19 injuries on the little girl, Éric Sabatier claimed that all of Marina's lesions were accidents of everyday life.

On 23 July 2008, the girl was heard alone by two police constables who questioned her about all her scars. The examination, video recorded and which would be screened at the parents' trial in June 2012, showed a girl small for her age, smiling, bright and laughing, who never failed to give an innocent explanation of each and every mark on her body.

At the trial in June 2012, Virginie Darras recalled having threatened her daughter that she would never see her parents again and that they could go to jail if she spoke to the police.

Numerous testimonies showed that Marina had always continued to love her parents and that her untrue explanations of her injuries were intended to protect her parents.

The police constable in charge of the investigation never met the officials who originated the alert, and on 10 October, 2008, the investigation by the public prosecutor's office was terminated without further action.

On its side, the child welfare service (L'aide sociale à l'enfance (l'ASE)) of the Sarthe region enquired on 9 March, 2009 of the outcome of the investigation opened by the public prosecutor's office in the city le Mans and in April 2009, called for an evaluative investigation after a new report of the headmaster of Marina's school. The document sent by the school referred to "repeated and unjustified absenteeism, small unexplained injuries, and a bulimic behaviour".

On 27 April, 2009, Marina returned from vacation with serious foot injuries. She was in a new school in Coulans-sur-Gée. The school headmistress and the school doctor urgently sent her to hospital for treatment where she stayed for 5 weeks. The hospital vainly sought a medical explanation for the little girl's state, then reported to social services suspicions of abuse. Despite this, on 28 May, 2009 the little girl was returned to her family.

The investigation by the child welfare service (ASE) could only begin on 25 May, 2009 and in June 2009, the social worker responsible for the investigation and a nursery nurse visited the Sabatier family. They detected "no element of danger" with children who were "relaxed and smiling".

Marina died during the night of the 6 to 7 August, 2009 as a result of a particularly brutal session of abuse that evening by her parents. Before being left naked in the cellar before nightfall, she allegedly uttered her last words that she had "mal à la tête" (a headache) and followed by "bonne nuit maman à demain" ("goodnight, Mummy, see you tomorrow").

On 9 September, 2009 Éric Sabatier alerted the gendarmerie of the disappearance of his daughter. He stated at the time to investigators that Marina had Down syndrome. But this was a ruse to explain his daughter's appearance in some photographs. In reality, Marina was a normal little girl who after years of head beatings had finally become disfigured. After three days of searching, investigators discovered inconsistencies in the information provided by the parents. Then the parents confessed. The father led investigators to the girl's body, which was enclosed in a plastic crate filled with concrete, wrapped in a sheet and 10 plastic bags.

The pathologist stated at the parents' trial and after the post-mortem that the causes of death were from an acute subdural haematoma, caused by a shock on the head, accumulated with asphyxiation by immersing repeatedly the head of the little girl under water and compounded by hypothermia and inhalation of vomit. During a coma due to the shock on the head and a major pulmonary oedema, Marina died around 4 am on 7 August, 2009.

== The trial of the parents ==
The trial of Marina's two parents took place from the 11 to 26 June, 2012 in the Court of Assizes (cour d’assises) of the Sarthe region. Four of the most important childhood protection associations in France assisted (more precisely, in French law these associations at the trial "se sont portées parties civiles"), a first for this type of trial, for, according to the counsel for one of them, this exceptional trial had to be exemplary.

Many witnesses were interviewed to try to understand the way Marina's case was pursued by the institutions. Targeted from before the start of the trial by the reproaches of the childhood protection associations, the child welfare service (ASE) received a note from the president of the General Council (le président du conseil général de la Sarthe, Jean-Marie Geveaux). who supported them and denied any fault of its services. This letter, published by the French newspaper Ouest-France, provoked criticism from the childhood protection associations.

Regarding the parents, even if they had generally acknowledged the facts and expressed regret, the trial did not really enable comprehension of their motives and the origin of the treatment suffered by Marina, singled out from her siblings. Two particularly poignant trial scenes were the film showing Marina's examination by two police constables in July 2008 and the testimony of Marina's elder half-brother, 13 years old at the time of the trial, who expressed his resentment towards his parents who had manipulated him for years in asking him to lie to the authorities about things he did not understand at the time to be not "normal".

The day of the verdict on 26 June, both parents were sentenced to 30 years imprisonment, without possibility of parole for a period of 20 years, for acts of torture and barbarity leading to the death of their 8-year-old daughter in 2009.

The public prosecutor (l'avocat général) Hervé Drevard said that the little girl Marina had not had the protection she deserved due to the lack of perspicacity and pugnacity of the professionals responsible for children's protection including the public prosecutor's office. The associations for childhood protection, who assisted in the trial, affirmed that Marina could have been saved from her murderous parents if the administrators and institutions responsible for childhood protection had better played their role.

== Controversy over institutional failures ==
In view of the longevity of Marina's torture, approximately 6 years, and that this had many times been officially reported, the inadequate action to protect the girl by various state institutions provoked criticism and condemnation by several childhood protection associations.

During the trial of June 2012, which focused on the responsibility of Marina's parents, four associations that assisted (more precisely, in French law these associations "s’étaient portées parties civiles") began to point out malfunctions and failures of the childhood protection system in France, in particular, that of the social services of the French department of Sarthe and the public prosecutor's office.

The lack of co-ordination and follow-up of Marina's case between the different institutions, and the superficiality of the criminal investigation, were particularly implicated. Only the school institutions escaped criticism, due to the effective communication of information between the various schools where Marina was educated, and the teaching staff's readiness to report its suspicions of abuse as well as in one instance on 27 April, 2009 when the school headmistress urgently hospitalised the little girl.

Following the parents' trial, several associations announced their intention to pursue legal action to address the roles of the state services and to propose measures to improve childhood protection. The objective was that there should be a "before" and an "after" Marina.

This movement also took the form of a solemn march for Marina in Paris on 18 November, 2012. The message communicated by this event was the indictment of a work practice in the childhood protection services which resulted in the death of Marina as well as children unjustifiably taken into care.

On the other hand, voices were raised in defence of the institutions involved, especially the social services. They argued that the administration had simply complied with the procedures and general setup for the prevention of child abuse, and that it was dangerous to draw conclusions on the overall effectiveness of the system from a single dramatic case.

The risk was also observed that, under the fear of being accused of negligence or failure to assist a person in danger, the administration and the personnel would react too quickly and excessively at the first hint of abuse, without sufficient verification that the action taken was correct and would benefit the child. Nevertheless, at the trial of Marina's parents, the public prosecutor explicitly questioned the responsibility of the General Council of Sarthe and that to decrease the rate of infant mortality by abuse (10 to 20 deaths per year (http://www.interieur.gouv.fr/Publications/Statistiques/Criminalite/2008) would possibly require legislative changes, perhaps including some on the definition of the failure to assist a person in danger.

One of the points of debate is the new law for childhood protection of March 2007, which gives a more important role to social services for the prevention of child abuse, but which is according to some observers misunderstood and misapplied.

Another point to consider is the capability of the public prosecutor's office to call itself into question while at the same time the legal action of the childhood protection associations has been checked by a court decision.

== See also ==
- List of solved missing person cases (2000s)
