= Edward Chikombo =

Zimbabwean journalist

- Born: 1942 or 1943
- Died: March 2007
- Cause of death: Homicide
- Occupation: Journalist

Edward Chikombo (born 1942/43, murdered in March 2007) was a Zimbabwean journalist, who, until 2002, worked as a cameraman for the Zimbabwe Broadcasting Corporation (ZBC). He was murdered in late March 2007.

== Background ==
Chikombo is believed to have sent to foreign media images of police brutality against supporters of the Movement for Democratic Change (MDC), including images of opposition leader Morgan Tsvangirai lying in hospital after one such beating on 11 March. On 29 March Chikombo was abducted from his home. According to The Independent,

His captors drove a silver pick-up truck of the same make used in numerous similar abductions during a sustained three-week terror campaign targeting government opponents.

Chikombo's body was discovered a few days later.

The murder sparked an outcry from international media and the International Federation of Journalists. The murderers were not identified, but foreign media linked the killing to an "escalation of the government's campaign of violence and intimidation". Chikombo's death in 2007 foreshadowed the killings of over eighty MDC supporters during the Zimbabwean presidential election in 2008 - including Gibson Nyandoro and Tonderai Ndira.

== See also ==
- List of solved missing person cases (2000s)
