= Murder of Jon-Niece Jones =

Murder of young American girl

Jon-Niece Jones
- Reconstruction of the victim by the National Center for Missing & Exploited Children
- Born: Jon-Niece Jones; September 5, 1992
- Died: August 15, 2002 (aged 9); Harlem, New York, U.S.
- Cause of death: Homicide of undetermined etiology
- Body discovered: March 18, 2005; Upper Freehold Township, Monmouth County, New Jersey
- Other name: "Baby Bones"
- Citizenship: United States
- Known for: Formerly unidentified victim of homicide

Jon-Niece Jones (previously known as "Baby Bones") was a nine-year-old American girl whose unidentified skeletal remains were found near the gated forest of New Jersey's Six Flags Great Adventure theme park, by a hunter in search of deer. The case was showcased by America's Most Wanted in 2009 in hopes of generating leads for the unsolved case. Jones was identified in October 2012. Her mother, Elisha, died three months after Jon-Niece was murdered; Jon-Niece's aunt, her aunt's boyfriend, and an uncle were charged with concealing evidence of the child's death, believed to have been the result of abuse by her mother.

== Discovery ==
On March 18, 2005, a man hunting in Upper Freehold Township, New Jersey discovered a small human skull, later estimated to have belonged to a five- to nine-year-old girl, in the wooded undergrowth. The site, which was 3 miles (4.8 km) from Six Flags Great Adventure and close to Clayton Park, was cordoned off by New Jersey State Police Crime Scene Investigators. A black Nike shoe found with the remains had evidence of burning, which led authorities to presume the body was burned to prevent it from being found or identified. The shoe was later found to have been a brand that was developed in 2000 and was then released to consumers the following year. Additionally, a zipper and fragments of cloth material, possibly what the body was wrapped in, and a cloth bag with a Sylvester the Cat graphic was found. The zipper had markings that read "333" and investigators were unsure if it was tied to the scene or if it had been at the location already, like the sheets may have been. The fire that had been set to destroy the evidence had damaged the child's bones and teeth, as well as surrounding plant life.

No cause of death could be determined through study of the remains, despite the suspicious circumstances involved. The exact race of the child could not be estimated, although the skull appeared to belong to someone of a mixed race, likely with African-American ancestry. Although the cause of death was undetermined, the child had healing breaks in some of her ribs. Though her exact cause of death was not possible to estimate, the case was considered a homicide by investigators. More bones were eventually found at the scene, allowing an estimation of the victim's height and weight, which was determined to be between three feet and four feet two inches and twenty-five to seventy-five pounds. The date of death was estimated to be between the years of 2001 and 2004. Analysis of the child's teeth suggested she had lived in a populous region, such as a city, as fluoride was present. Apart from this, no other clues, such as evidence of dental care, were found.

== Investigation ==
Police believed that those who were responsible for disposing of the body may have traveled to the location on interstate 195. They presumed that the suspect or suspects did not "know the area very well," as a nearby swamp would have been an easier place to conceal human remains and destroy evidence. An additional clue that the perpetrators were not "local" included the fact that the body did not appear to have been buried, as there seemed to be little concern that anyone that knew the child would find the remains or that a local individual would likely have the means to bury a body, as the area was inhabited by those in a farming community.

Because of the fire that was set at the scene, a DNA profile of the girl could not be developed. However, it was possible to extract mitochondrial DNA from some of the bones. After the process of recovering mitochondrial DNA was complete at the University of North Texas, it was placed on file to compare to potential matches. The face of the child was reconstructed to provide a likeness of the victim's appearance in life, in hopes that someone that may have known the victim could recognize her. Artist Frank Bender created a clay sculpture, a composite sketch was created in 2007 and the National Center for Missing & Exploited Children eventually created a digital rendering by using a CAT-scanned copy of the skull.

Efforts to identify the remains were unsuccessful, as no potential matches were discovered. No missing children from the area and surrounding counties appeared to have matched the victim. Because of this, authorities presumed that the victim's family may have been involved in her death. Authorities urged the public to submit any possible leads of someone knowing of a child that seemed to have "disappeared over night" at some point leading up to the discovery of the remains. In 2009, the case was broadcast on the television show America's Most Wanted, which also showed reconstructions of the child. Approximately one hundred tips were submitted, yet none reportedly led to meaningful leads.

== Identification and convictions ==
Jon-Niece's sister, Iyonna, speculated that the remains might be those of Jon-Niece in August 2012. Iyonna Jones told authorities that after her death, the victim was placed in trash bags and then transported somewhere by her mother and other subjects. In October 2012, a DNA sample taken from Iyonna and compared with the remains confirmed that the two were related.

An investigation revealed that Jon-Niece had died in the home of her aunt, Likisha Jones, on August 15, 2002, as a result of physical abuse and neglect at the hands of her mother, Elisha Jones. It was alleged that the victim's mother Elisha, her uncle James Jones, and her aunt's boyfriend, Godfrey Gibson, first set the body on fire and then disposed of it where it was later found after three years. No missing person report was ever filed after Jones's death.

Although Elisha Jones had died in December 2002, Likisha Jones, James Jones, and Godfrey Gibson were charged in October 2012 with evidence tampering, obstruction of justice and hindering apprehension. Likisha Jones and Godfrey Gibson were apprehended at their apartment and James Jones eventually surrendered by turning himself in to authorities. The three were indicted on January 7, 2013, and released on bail. At the time of her arrest, Likisha Jones was raising 13 children alongside her boyfriend. None of the thirteen children appeared to have any recollection of Jon-Niece. The second-eldest of the thirteen stated that, "We don't know any cousin", and added that the arrests had come as a surprise. The trials were held in Freehold, New Jersey.

The three suspects initially pleaded not guilty. In late 2013, they eventually pleaded guilty to the charges. Law enforcement stated that Jones's deceased mother was presumed to be the sole person responsible for the girl's death and believed that the other suspects were not involved in the killing. On March 1, 2014, Likisha and James Jones were sentenced to two years' probation. Godfrey Gibson was sentenced to one year, minus one day, in prison.

== See also ==
- List of solved missing person cases (post-2000)
