= Ruinerwold secluded family =

Family found in hiding in Drenthe, Netherlands

In October 2019, 67-year-old Gerrit-Jan van Dorsten and his six adult children were discovered in Ruinerwold, a village in the Dutch province of Drenthe, where they had lived in seclusion for over ten years, since March 2009, in a farmhouse. Only the 58-year-old man who had rented the house had been seen around the village.

== Seclusion and discovery ==
The adult children were thought to be aged 18 to 25. The family was found after the oldest child Israel, who has also called himself Jan, 25, left the house and spoke to local people in Ruinerwold. He had already become active on social media for a few months. His pictures show that he sometimes left the house after dark to go to the village. One of the children stated that they had never been to school. None of the six adult children were in official records of births and citizens.

The 67-year-old man had four more children, a total of ten children as of 2019. His eldest son was never a part of the same cult, and the three eldest children, of the nine he had with his second wife, fled the family home in 2011. Only the six youngest children remained in seclusion until 2019. The 67-year-old man had extensive Facebook pages and his own website, but did not mention his children. He had previously been a member of the Unification Church cult in the 1980s. He apparently believed that the outside world was "unclean". He seemed to be trying to create an ecological utopia.

According to a court judgment in 2021, the father suffered a stroke in 2016, rendering him incapable of coherent communication.

== Aftermath ==
On 17 October 2019, the father appeared at court having been arrested and charged with unlawful deprivation of liberty, harming other people's health, and money laundering. In 2021, his prosecution was terminated because of his medical condition.

The 58-year-old man who rented the house and was often seen around but slept elsewhere was also arrested, initially for obstructing the police investigation and later on suspicion of complicity. They were not allowed any contact with the adult children, to avoid influencing them as witnesses and possible victims. In 2020, the 58-year-old man was convicted of unlawful deprivation of liberty and sentenced to three years in prison.

A few years later a Dutch documentary was made about this case named De kinderen van Ruinerwold (The children of Ruinerwold). It was awarded with the Televizier-ring, a Dutch TV-award.

== See also ==
- List of long-term false imprisonment cases
