= Simmi Kahlon =

Indian-Canadian serial killer

- Born: Harsimrat Kahlon; 1982; Chandigarh, India
- Died: October 4, 2009 (aged 26–27); Calgary, Alberta, Canada
- Cause of death: Complications from pregnancy
- Conviction: N/A
- Penalty: N/A

Details
- Victims: 3
- Span of crimes: 2005–2009
- Country: Canada
- State: Alberta
- Date apprehended: N/A

Harsimrat Kahlon (1982 – October 4, 2009) was an Indian-Canadian serial killer who murdered three of her newborn infants between 2005 and 2009 in Calgary. Following her death, a result from complications from her last pregnancy, Kahlon's common-law husband Harnek Mahal found the infants' bodies stuffed in a suitcase and a box, reporting the findings to police, who later determined that the children were likely murdered by their mother.

== Early life ==
Harsimrat Kahlon was born in Chandigarh, India in 1982, to Sikh parents. In 1999, she emigrated to Canada, settling in with her aunt and uncle in Martindale. She was employed as an assistant and receptionist at a law firm, where her fellow employees described her as a hard worker who appeared to be very happy with life. Her live-in boyfriend, Harnek Mahal, was a long-haul trucker who worked away from home, and the couple were described as quiet and keeping mostly to themselves. They initially lived at a basement suite in Falconridge, before moving to the Taradale neighborhood in 2006.

== Death and exposure ==
On October 4, 2009, after returning home from work, Mahal found Kahlon lying face-down on the floor of her bedroom, motionless. He quickly called the police, who came to examine the apartment. Her death was ruled not to be suspicious, later determined to be complications from childbirth. On the following day, Mahal phoned the authorities again, claiming that he had found a suspicious suitcase in a garbage bag, which apparently had blood and others fluids dripping from it. A medical examiner was dispatched to the home and opened the bag, finding the body of a newborn infant in it.

A more thorough search was then conducted on the premises, with Mahal's sister making another find only a few hours in: another box with two corpses and a placenta in it. When queried on the matter, Mahal explained that he knew that Kahlon had been pregnant in the early 2000s, but both of them agreed that she'd get an abortion, and that he was unaware about the other two pregnancies. According to the investigating forensic psychologist, Dr. J. Thomas Dalby, it was likely that Kahlon had some kind of personality disorder or depression, leading to an unstable personality and self-loathing. In her secret diary, it was made clear that Kahlon felt no guilt about the children's deaths, but apparently felt some kind of attachment to them, as she had kept the bodies on her property long after they had died.

The first child was identified as Reet Kahlon, a baby girl born in 2005 at the Peter Lougheed Centre to an unknown father, who remained unaccounted for after her birth. When found, she was still wearing a hospital ID bracelet. The other two infants, who were apparently unnamed, were born alive at home in the summer of 2009 by Kahlon, while Mahal was away. Bloodied towels, sheets, clothing, cloths and a garden hose were used as crude instruments during the ordeal, and to hide the corpses after death, Kahlon hid them in her bedroom, spraying air freshener to mask the smell of decaying flesh. Questions surrounding the case, including why Kahlon killed the children and why she kept the bodies, have been left unanswered, and are likely to remain that way, as authorities have officially closed the case.

== See also ==
- List of serial killers by country
- Burton, S. & Dalby, J.T. (2012) Psychological autopsy in the investigation of serial neonaticides. Journal of Forensic Sciences, 57, 270–272.
