= Murder of Nathalie Mahy and Stacy Lemmens =

Murder of Belgian step-sisters

Nathalie Mahy
- Born: 9 August 1995; Belgium
- Disappeared: 10 June 2006 (aged 10); Liège, Wallonia, Belgium
- Cause of death: murder
- Body discovered: 28 June 2006
- Parents: Didier Mahy (father); Catherine Dizier (mother)

Stacy Lemmens
- Born: 14 December 1998; Belgium
- Disappeared: 10 June 2006 (aged 7); Liège, Wallonia, Belgium
- Cause of death: murder
- Body discovered: 28 June 2006
- Parents: Thierry Lemmens (father); Christiane Granziero (mother)

Nathalie Mahy (9 August 1995 – c. 10 June 2006) and Stacy Lemmens (14 December 1998 – c. 10 June 2006) were two Belgian stepsisters who disappeared in the city of Liège on June 10, 2006, and were found murdered on June 28, 2006. The disappearance and subsequent finding of the murdered girls caused a commotion in Belgium, exacerbated by similarities to the paedophilic murders committed by Marc Dutroux in 1996.

== The family ==
Nathalie Mahy was the daughter of Didier Mahy and Catherine Dizier. Stacy Lemmens was the daughter of Thierry Lemmens and Christiane Granziero. Granziero had been found guilty of child neglect and was arrested on January 17, 2008, for drug trafficking.

== Disappearance ==
On June 10, 2006, at 01:00, the two were playing outside the bar "Aux Armuriers" in the borough Saint-Léonard, while Catherine Dizier and her friend Thierry Lemmens were inside, reportedly drunk. Around 3 a.m., their disappearance was noticed and the police and Child Focus alerted.

== Investigation ==
On June 13, the prime suspect, Abdallah Ait-Oud, turned himself in after seeing his photo on television. He denied having anything to do with the case and claimed to have an alibi. However, it was established that he was in the cafe that night. Moreover, he had a history of child abuse, for which he had been incarcerated. He was released in December 2005 from a mental hospital after raping two minors, one being his niece. He never admitted to his previous crimes.

On June 28, the bodies of both girls were found in a sewer in Liège, some 400 metres from the bar "Aux Armuriers". The Justice Department confirmed that the girls were murdered by strangulation, while Nathalie's body showed the signs of sexual abuse. On the same day, Dutch newspaper De Telegraaf received a letter with detailed information on the whereabouts of the two girls, a letter post-dated June 27.

The Justice Department also confirmed that DNA of a third person has been found on the bodies. The identity of this third person has not yet been established since, incredibly, there are still no conclusive results of the DNA analysis. His slight injuries and traces found on his clothes when Ait-Oud turned himself in are consistent with those he would have suffered when dumping the girls in the place they were found. He is also said to have shaved his head the night of the disappearance. After looking into the investigation files, the father of Stacy Lemmens declared that he believed Ait-Oud was guilty.

On November 14, 2006, it was reported that in the same neighbourhood where Mahy and Lemmens lived, an 11-year-old child was almost kidnapped at knifepoint by a 20- to 30-year-old man, were it not for a bystander who helped the child into safety. The suspect, of Slavic-Italian appearance, drove away in a Volkswagen Golf with a German license plate, together with an accomplice.

== Criminal trial and sentence ==
On June 10, 2008, Abdallah Ait Oud was found guilty by a jury of kidnapping, rape and murder of the children, and sentenced to life imprisonment (which, under Belgian law, is most of the time not fully served in prison but later on changed into a suspended sentence).

== See also ==
- Crime in Belgium
- List of kidnappings
- List of solved missing person cases (2000s)
