= Death of Paula Hounslea =

2009 murder in Liverpool, England

Paula Hounslea
- Born: 1972; Liverpool, England
- Disappeared: 22 August 2009 (aged 36–37); West Derby, Liverpool, England
- Body discovered: 5 May 2012, Fazakerley, Liverpool, England

Paula Hounslea was a British victim of a murder that remains unsolved. She went missing on 22 August 2009 and her body was discovered on 5 May 2012. Hounslea's daughter and her daughter's boyfriend were arrested for her murder but there was not enough evidence to bring a prosecution against either of them. The investigation remains open.

== Background ==
Hounslea was 37 years old at the time of her disappearance, was white, around 5 ft 8 in (173 cm) tall, of medium build with blonde or light brown shoulder-length hair. Hounslea was described as having bipolar disorder and was in poor health. Although at the time of the disappearance she was not known to have a job, it was thought she may have been employed as a bartender and seamstress. Hounslea lived with her only daughter, Lois, in Culme Road, West Derby, Liverpool.

She was last seen wearing a grey jumper and possibly a pink cardigan over the top with dark jeans and a gold Madonna pendant necklace. It is thought that she had three small bags of clothes with her. Hounslea was last seen by her family when they dropped her off at her home after a family meal at a Chinese restaurant.

== Disappearance ==
The next morning, on 22 August 2009, Lois claims that Hounslea went into her room and told her that she was going to stay with a friend named Vicky for a few days. That evening, Lois received a text message from Hounslea's phone saying that she was going to stay with a friend, Vicky. Vicky also received a message from Hounslea's phone, saying that she was going away for a few days. It was later established that Hounslea had booked and paid for a hotel room for that night, but never arrived to check in.

The alarm was raised when it was discovered that Hounslea had not stayed with Vicky and had not called her parents, which was said to be out of character.

Hounslea's cash card was used to withdraw a total of £850 following her disappearance. Police have stated that both Hounslea and her daughter knew the PIN for the card.

During the period of her disappearance, an apparent attempt to phone Vicky had been made from Hounslea's phone; however, technical problems prevented the call from being connected. A total of 176 calls were made to Hounslea's voicemail after her disappearance. These calls came from Vicky, and Hounslea's parents and sisters; none came from her daughter Lois.

== Discovery of the body ==
On 5 May 2012, Hounslea's body was found by a dog walker next to the loop line cycle path in Fazakerley, Liverpool near its junction with Blackthorn Road. The dog discovered the bones on an embankment in what appeared to be an old fire pit. The male dog walker called the police immediately. The body was identified using Hounslea's medical and dental records. A 20 cm kitchen knife and some melted blue plastic were found with Hounslea's body. Police were unable to establish the time of Hounslea's death; her body was believed to have been left in the fire pit between September 2011 and January 2012.

== Subsequent events ==
Police launched a murder inquiry following the discovery of the body and appealed to the public with the hope of making contact with anyone who saw Hounslea either on the day of the disappearance or after.

On 13 June 2012, Hounslea's daughter Lois and her boyfriend, Kevin Kavanagh, then aged 21 and 20 respectively, were arrested on suspicion of murder. They were released on bail the next day. The house Lois shared with her mother was sealed off for forensic examination. Lois and Kevin were released without charge in August 2013 due to insufficient evidence.

=== Inquest ===
At the inquest, prosecutors stated there was not enough evidence to charge Lois and Kavanagh as there was "no realistic prospect of conviction". Lois was twice summoned to appear at her mother's inquest but failed to attend both times as she was unwell after suffering an asthma attack. She was admitted to hospital for this. Kavanagh appeared as a witness but refused to answer questions. A narrative verdict was recorded and the police have stated that the case remains open.

== See also ==
- List of solved missing person cases (post-2000)
