= Teruel, Huila =

Coordinates: 2°45′N 75°34′W

- Municipality and town
- Flag Coat of arms

- Location of the municipality and town of Teruel, Huila in the Huila Department of Colombia.
- Country: Colombia
- Department: Huila Department
- Elevation: 910 m (2,990 ft)
- Time zone: UTC-5 (Colombia Standard Time)

Teruel is a town and municipality in the Huila Department, Colombia.
