= Thomas McDowell =

British man (born 1977)

Thomas Hamilton McDowell (born 1977) is a British man who was convicted of the murder in 2002 of German trainee rabbi Andreas Hinz.

== Early life ==
McDowell was born in Ballymena, County Antrim, Northern Ireland.

== Crime ==
Hinz, a 37-year-old trainee Reform rabbi, gifted linguist and German national had spent the night of 3 July 2002 drinking alone in the Black Cap, a gay bar in Camden, North London. After striking up a conversation with McDowell, he left the bar with him in the early hours and returned to McDowell's flat in Baynes Street, Camden. Hinz had arrived in Britain in 2000 to begin his training to become a rabbi at the Leo Baeck College.

After knocking Hinz to the floor with a martial arts kick, McDowell proceeded to strangle Hinz before dismembering his body with a rip saw. The body parts were wrapped in bin liners and put out onto a street near St Pancras Way for the rubbish collectors. Their subsequent decomposition exacerbated by summer heat led to a terrible smell and a cloud of flies that eventually led to their gruesome discovery.

Barbara Hinz, his mother, returned home to Ulm, Germany after flying to London the following week to appeal for help finding her son. His cousin Claudia Bobermin also flew with his mother to London in their appeal to find Hinz.

== Sentence ==
McDowell briefly appeared in the Old Bailey on 2 December 2002 in relation to killing Hinz, and was remanded in custody until 14 February 2003.

At the trial of McDowell in September 2004, it was revealed that as a child he had been abused by a relative and grew up with a sense of hatred towards homosexuals, as well as suffering from a personality disorder. McDowell was a medical student at the time of the murder and had also been working as a male prostitute. McDowell admitted manslaughter on the grounds of diminished responsibility, and was subsequently sentenced to life imprisonment at Southwark Crown Court on 30 September 2004.

The trial judge spoke of his doubt as to whether it would ever be thought safe to release McDowell back into the community, and recommended that he should never be released. He began his life sentence at Rampton Secure Hospital in Nottinghamshire.
