= Disappearance of Abigail Blagg =

2001 disappearance in Colorado, U.S.

- Blagg c. 2001
- Born: Abigail Jo Blagg; March 21, 1995
- Disappeared: November 13, 2001 (aged 6); Grand Junction, Colorado
- Status: Missing for 24 years, 8 months and 25 days
- Height: 4 ft 0 in (122 cm)
- Parents: Michael Francis Blagg (father); Jennifer Loman Blagg (mother)

On November 13, 2001, Abigail Jo Blagg, a six‑year‑old girl from Grand Junction, Colorado, disappeared from her home. That same day, her father, Michael Francis Blagg, murdered her mother, Jennifer Loman Blagg. Jennifer's body was recovered in June 2002, and Michael was later convicted of her murder. Abigail has never been found.

== Life and prior events ==
Abigail Jo Blagg was born on March 21, 1995, to Jennifer Loman Blagg and Michael Francis Blagg. At the time of her disappearance, the family was living in Grand Junction, Colorado. Abigail was enrolled as a first‑grader at Bookcliff Christian School, where Jennifer worked as a teacher's aide. Before moving to Colorado, the Blaggs had lived in the Sumterville area of South Carolina and attended the First Baptist Church.

== Disappearance ==
On the afternoon of November 12, 2001, Blagg and her mother were seen at their home on the 2200 block of Pine Terrace Court in Grand Junction. Later that day, a struggle occurred while Abigail was in a second‑floor bedroom. A large pool of blood was found on a mattress in the master bedroom, and both Jennifer and Abigail were missing from the residence.

On the day of Abigail's disappearance, some of Jennifer Blagg's jewelry had been stolen.

== Aftermath ==
Jennifer remained a missing person until June 4, 2002, when her body was found in the Mesa County landfill, wrapped in a tent. Abigail was never found, and remains a missing person as of 2026. In 2014, DNA samples believed to be of Abigail's were collected by authorities, but the process for confirming that the DNA was hers was never completed for unknown reasons.

Michael Blagg attempted suicide in February 2002 after being questioned about allegedly stealing office equipment; he denied involvement in the disappearance in a suicide note. The following month, authorities confirmed that foul play was likely involved in Abigail's disappearance. In 2004, Michael was convicted for the murder of Jennifer Blagg, although he was never charged in relation to Abigail's disappearance due to her never being located. In a 2018 retrial the ruling was upheld, and Michael Blagg was sentenced to life imprisonment without the possibility of parole. A third retrial in 2023 upheld the previous ruling. Blagg's abduction was logged in the National Missing and Unidentified Persons System as case number #MP5857, and in The Doe Network as case number 4434DFCO. The Doe Network classifies her disappearance as "Endangered Missing".

As of 2026 Abigail has not been located, and no one has been charged in relation to her disappearance.

== See also ==
- List of kidnappings (2000–2009)
  - List of murdered American children
- List of people who disappeared mysteriously (2000–present)
- Murder of Jessica Ridgeway, a 2012 kidnapping and murder in Westminster, Colorado
