= Virpi Butt =

Finnish murderer

Lucrezia Francesca Pandora Butt
- Born: Virpi Sanna Sinikka Butt; August 9, 1972
- Died: November 22, 2021 (aged 49); Ghana
- Television: Gladiaattorit (1993-94 season, as Timantti)
- Children: 2
- Status: Convicted
- Criminal charges: Murder, Dismemberment, Robbery
- Penalty: Life imprisonment
- Capture status: Arrested
- Accomplice: Janne Hyvönen

Details
- Victims: Arto Malinen; Kari Pekka Anttonen
- Date: Midsummer 2003 (Malinen); May 2002 (Anttonen)
- Span of crimes: 2002–2003
- Country: Finland
- Locations: Pirkkala; Tampere
- Killed: 2
- Weapons: Kitchen knife; Saw
- Imprisoned at: Yes (released December 31, 2018)

Lucrezia Francesca Pandora Butt (formerly Virpi Sanna Sinikka Butt (Finnish pronunciation: [ˈvirpi butː]); August 9, 1972 – November 22, 2021) was a Finnish murderer and suspected serial killer. She first became known as Timantti in the 1993-94 season of the television series Gladiaattorit.

== Murders in Pirkkala ==
Virpi Butt was sentenced in Tampere District Court and Turku Court of Appeal to life imprisonment for the dismemberment of 26-year-old Arto Malinen in Pirkkala on Midsummer 2003.

=== Murder of Kari Anttonen and cannibalism ===
The investigation into the death of Arto Malinen also brought to light the murder of the 29-year-old programmer Kari Pekka Anttonen, who had disappeared over a year earlier. Anttonen and Butt had been dating for some time before his murder in May 2002. Anttonen was spending an evening with Butt and Janne Hyvönen, a friend of Butt's, at the restaurant Sputnik in Tampere. At the end of the evening, the trio ended up going to Butt's apartment. Early in the morning, Hyvönen stabbed Anttonen in the back and sawed his head off. Butt picked up his head. Butt and Hyvönen dragged Anttonen's body into the bathroom and cleaned the apartment. The killing took place at Butt's home, and two of her minor children were present. A two-year-old boy slept in the same room where Anttonen was killed. The 16-year-old boy was sleeping in a walk-in wardrobe, but at some point he went to see what was happening in the room and also saw the body.

Hyvönen told the court that he cut off Anttonen's legs and put them in the oven with spices and salt, after which he ate Anttonen's meat. Butt did not participate in the cannibalism, although she later tried to offer Anttonen's meat as "chops" to an acquaintance. The rest of the dismembered body was packed into cardboard boxes and put on the balcony because it had begun to smell. In the morning, a friend of Hyvönen was called and his car was used to transport the cardboard boxes, which Hyvönen and Butt claimed contained garbage, into trash cans in different parts of Tampere. Butt and Hyvönen originally wanted the boxes to be taken farther away to Nokia, but the driver did not agree to this. The driver, who denied knowing what was in the boxes, was later charged with accessory to crime.

After the murder, Butt had presented Anttonen's head to other people. As a motive for presenting the severed head, Butt told the court that she presented the head because she wanted the crime to be revealed to the police. Hyvönen had finally put Anttonen's head in a pot to fry and watched how the expression on his face became distorted. In court, Hyvönen described his act: "I just watched when it changed its expression. It started smiling. I was sitting in the kitchen myself, drinking liquor and laughing." According to Butt, Hyvönen had removed Anttonen's teeth by beating them with a knife, which Hyvönen denied in court.

=== Murder and dismemberment of Arto Malinen ===
On Midsummer's Eve of 2003, Janne Hyvönen stayed to take care of Butt's three-year-old child while she was getting alcoholic beverages to celebrate Midsummer. On her way, Butt ran into Arto Malinen, a 26-year-old man who was likewise celebrating. They drank at a bar until closing time and took a taxi to Malinen's apartment in Pirkkala. The next day, Malinen and Butt continued drinking at a bar until they were forced to leave because it turned out that Butt had been banned from the establishment. On the street, they were joined by a young man who wanted to buy drugs, and Butt suggested moving to Malinen's apartment. The young man lost his temper when there were no promised drugs at Malinen's apartment, and a dispute arose, during which Malinen asked both Butt and the man to leave. The argument ended with Butt stabbing Malinen ten times in the back with a kitchen knife. Butt called Hyvönen, and they dismembered Malinen's body and robbed the victim.

Butt later told in court that she had first stripped Malinen naked and then sawed his head off. The victim's organs were then disposed into a bag, a bucket and the toilet. As a justification for this, she said that she wanted to prevent the internal organs from smelling. Hyvönen had cut off the victim's fingertips to prevent identification. The perpetrators then tried to run over Malinen's head in the yard with a car, but the attempt failed, because the head always slipped to the side.

A woman who had accompanied the party to the apartment told the court that Butt had threatened to kill her as well, which Butt denied. The woman informed the police, which led to the arrest of Butt and Hyvönen.

=== Criminal investigation and trial ===
At first, the emergency center did not believe that a dismemberment had occurred and dismissed the first call as a joke. After the investigation began, Anttonen's body was searched for in Nokia's Koukkujärvi landfill, but was not found. Malinen's body was found in Nokia.

Hyvönen came to the trial wearing the clothes of the murdered victim. The perpetrators requested and were granted access to mental state examinations, where they were found fully mentally capable. Butt claimed that the anabolic steroids she had taken during the 1990s had affected her hormonal balance, thus resulting in violent behavior. She asked for a reduced sentence, which the court denied. The court ordered Hyvönen and Butt to pay over 100,000 euros in compensation to the families of the victims, and both were sentenced to life in prison.

== Release and life after prison ==
The Helsinki Court of Appeal accepted Butt's parole request in August 2017 and set her release date in late 2018, when she has been in prison for about 15.5 years. According to the overall forensic psychiatric assessment, Butt had a high risk of committing a violent crime again, so the Criminal Sanctions Institute and the Psychiatric Prison Hospital were against her release. However, the Court of Appeal considered that, among other things, Butt's close relationship with her family and having an apartment make it easier to return to civilian life. The Court of Appeal considered that there was a positive development in Butt's situation.

Butt was released on December 31, 2018. Janne Hyvönen was released on March 1, 2019. He died on May 25, 2025, aged 50.

After her release, Virpi Butt changed her name to Lucrezia Francesca Pandora Butt, moved to Kuru, a small town in western Finland and started working in a nationally operating company. She got married in the last years of her life. Butt's spouse filed for divorce in June 2021. The divorce did not take effect, as Butt died about six months later in November 2021. She was staying in Ghana before her death. Her cause of death remains undisclosed.

She remains the only suspect in the disappearance of the 16-year-old Raisa Räisänen in Tampere in 1999.
