= Murder of Heather Strong =

Woman murdered in Florida, U.S.

Heather Strong
- Born: March 23, 1982; Starkville, Mississippi, U.S.
- Died: February 15, 2009 (aged 26); Boardman, Florida, U.S.
- Cause of death: Homicide by asphixiation
- Body discovered: March 19, 2009
- Known for: Murder victim

The murder of Heather Strong occurred on February 15, 2009, when 26-year-old Strong was kidnapped and murdered in Marion County, Florida. Strong (born March 23, 1982) was reported missing on February 15 while at work. Her remains were discovered on March 19, 2009.

Strong's husband Joshua Fulgham and his sometime girlfriend Emilia Carr came under suspicion, with romantic jealousy being a key motive. Carr was convicted of murder and sentenced to death by lethal injection. Fulgham was convicted of first-degree murder and kidnapping and sentenced to two consecutive sentences of life in prison.

As of 2011 Carr was one of five women on death row in the state of Florida. On May 19, 2017, she was re-sentenced to life without parole. She consistently stated that she was innocent and said her confession was coerced by police.

== Background ==
Heather Strong was born on March 23, 1982 in Starkville, Mississippi. At age sixteen, while working as a waitress at a diner in her hometown, she met Joshua Fulgham, aged 17 at the time, who had a local reputation as a delinquent. They started dating and had a relationship for the next decade. Fulgham was described as controlling and sometimes physically violent during the relationship, leading to some police calls to their home. In 2004, Strong and Fulgham moved to Marion County, Florida. By this point, the couple had one child, and Strong was pregnant with a second. In early 2008, Strong left Fulgham, taking their two children and moving in with a cousin in Columbus, Ohio. A few months later, Fulgham arrived at Strong's new residence and convinced Strong to return with him to Florida, without informing Strong that he had started a new relationship during her absence.

Emilia Lily Carr (née Yera) was born on August 4, 1984. She was the second of three sisters. A psychologist estimated her IQ to be 125. At the age of 15, she reported abuse by her father to her school, but withdrew her statement to officials. In February 2004, Carr's father was convicted of attempting to solicit the murders of his family (Emilia, her mother, and one of her sisters) and was sentenced to four years in prison.

Carr had been married twice and filed a restraining order against one of her ex-husbands for domestic violence. She was sentenced to two years of probation for her involvement in her ex-husband's grand theft of exotic birds. Carr had three children at the time, one of them with ex-boyfriend Jamie Acome. At the time of the murder, she was eight months pregnant with a child presumed to be Joshua Fulgham's.

In November 2008, Carr became engaged to Joshua Damien Fulgham, who instead married Heather Strong one month later. However, Carr maintained contact with them and babysat Strong's two children, according to Carr's family. In January 2009, Fulgham was arrested for threatening Strong with a shotgun, but was released after the charge of aggravated assault with a firearm was dropped. Investigators later discovered that Carr had threatened Strong with a knife to force her to withdraw her criminal complaint. Carr and Fulgham re-established their relationship while Strong began seeing someone else. Fulgham and Strong became involved in a legal battle over the custody of their two children.

== Murder ==
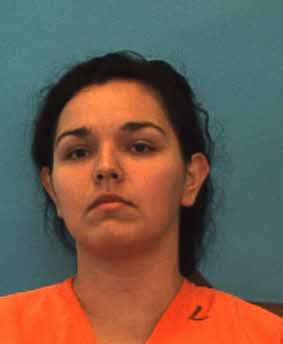
Florida Department of Corrections photo of Carr

Heather Strong worked in Reddick, Florida, and was found dead in Boardman on March 19, 2009.

In February 2009, Heather Strong, then a 26-year-old resident of Citra, Florida, disappeared while employed at an Iron Skillet restaurant at a Petro gas station next to Interstate 75 in Reddick. She was reported missing on February 15. Her remains were discovered on March 19 in a shallow grave by a storage trailer in Boardman, near McIntosh, Florida. Carr was arrested on March 24, after investigators noted the frequency of her statements to authorities, ten in all without the presence of an attorney. Detectives also recorded undercover audio of Carr discussing details of the crime with Fulgham's sister. Carr, who at the time was seven months pregnant with Fulgham's child, tricked Strong into the storage trailer behind the home of Carr's mother Maria and placed a plastic bag over her head after unsuccessfully trying to break her neck. Strong eventually died of asphyxiation while bound by duct tape to a computer chair.

Strong's estranged husband Joshua Fulgham was arrested on suspicion of fraud for using her credit cards after she had disappeared. Later in March 2009, Carr gave birth to her fourth child while in custody at Marion County Jail; Her family gained custody of her older three children while her daughter by Fulgham has since been adopted. Carr provided a confession to investigators, but claimed that she had only done so in the hope of being reunited with her children.

== Trials of Emilia Carr and Joshua Fulgham ==
Emilia Carr and Joshua Fulgham waived their right to a speedy trial during their arraignment for murder in April 2009. Prosecutor Rock Hooker immediately filed notice of his intent to pursue the death penalty because of the heinous nature of the crime. In November 2009, State Circuit Judge Willard Pope declined Emilia Carr's request for a continuance of the trial because of her concerns over the preparedness of defense attorney Candace Hawthorne. A jury found Carr guilty of first-degree murder and kidnapping after two and a half hours of deliberations on December 7, 2010. During the penalty phase of the trial, Carr's family testified on her behalf that she had been traumatized since her early childhood by sexual abuse from her father and grandfather. However, the jury voted 7-to-5 on December 10 in favor of the death penalty for Carr. She was formally sentenced to death by lethal injection on February 22, 2011.

More than a year after Carr's conviction for the murder of Heather Strong, her co-defendant Joshua Fulgham went on trial for his alleged participation in the murder in April 2012. Carr, on death row at the Lowell Correctional Institution Annex, would not testify at the trial. The prosecution detailed the gruesome aspects of the crime. Both the prosecution and Fulgham's defense attorneys agreed that the motives for Heather Strong's murder were jealousy and betrayal. At the conclusion of his trial, Fulgham was convicted of first-degree murder and kidnapping. Despite the death sentence of his co-defendant, Joshua's jury voted 8-to-4 to sentence him to life in prison without a chance of parole and the judge followed the jury's recommendation.

Carr was placed in the annex at Lowell Correctional Institution in Marion County on February 23, 2011. She was one of five women on death row in Florida, the other four being Tiffany Cole, Margaret Allen, Ana Maria Cardona and Tina Brown. Carr also became the first woman to be sentenced to death in Marion County since the 1992 sentencing of Aileen Wuornos. On May 19, 2017, Emilia Carr was re-sentenced to life without parole.

Carr was one of the many subjects in Diane Sawyer's Hidden America special documentary entitled, A Nation of Women behind Bars. In the film Carr talks about her life on death row. At the release time of the documentary Carr was the youngest woman on death row in America.

== See also ==
- Capital punishment in Florida
- Capital punishment in the United States
- List of females executed in the United States
- List of solved missing person cases (2000s)
- List of women on death row in the United States
- List of death row inmates in the United States
