= Florida Women's Reception Center =

Prison in Ocala, Florida, US

Coordinates: 29°18′35″N 82°11′11″W

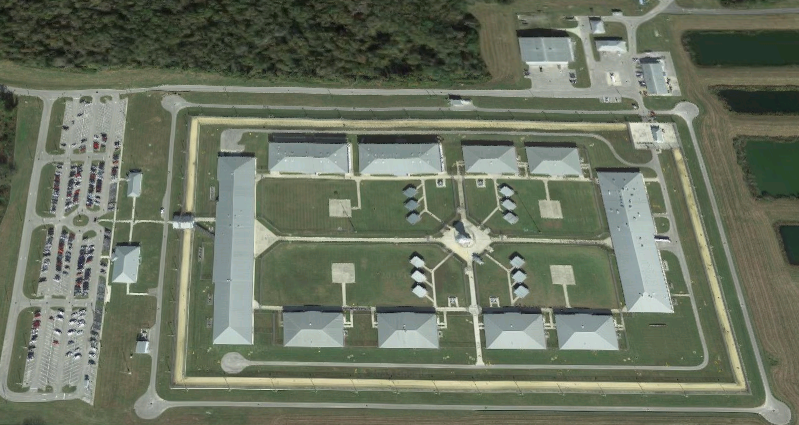
- Overhead of FWRC
- Interactive map of Florida Women's Reception Center
- Location: 3700 NW 111th Place Ocala, Florida
- Status: Operational
- Security class: Minimum, medium, and close
- Capacity: 1,345
- Population: 932 (September 2019)
- Opened: 2012
- Managed by: Florida Department of Corrections
- Warden: Nan Jeffcoat

The Florida Women's Reception Center (FWRC) is a state prison for women located in Ocala, Marion County, Florida, owned and operated by the Florida Department of Corrections.

This facility has multiple missions for Florida state female inmates: "reception, in-patient mental health, faith, and character based (programs) and general population." It has a maximum capacity of 1,235 inmates at a mix of security levels, including minimum, medium, and close.

Prior to August 2013, it was known as the "Lowell Reception Center", reflecting its relationship with the nearby Lowell Correctional Institution, which is the largest single women's prison in the U.S. The facility is also adjacent to Florida's Marion Correctional Institution, a men's facility.

FWRC has come under criticism for the quality of its medical care. Following an audit in September 2015, an oversight board declared a "medical emergency" at the facility, citing at least three individual inmates with untreated life-threatening medical conditions, poor recordkeeping, and other serious deficiencies on the part of the DOC and its medical provider, Corizon.

== Notable Inmates ==
- Rachel Wade – Found guilty of murder in the second degree in the murder of Sarah Ludemann.
- Denise Williams – Found guilty of orchestrating the murder of her husband Jerry Michael Williams.
- Marissa Mowry – Found guilty of raping and getting pregnant by an 11-year-old boy she was babysitting, now moved to the Lowell Correctional Institution
- Sarah Boone - Found guilty of murder in the second degree in the suitcase murder of boyfriend, Jorge Torres. She has moved to the Lowell Correctional Institution
- Donna Adelson -The matriarch of a wealthy South Florida family who was convicted in the hired killing of her former son-in-law, was sentenced to life in prison for her role in the 2014 murder-for-hire of Daniel Markel.
