= Murder of Mike Williams =

American man murdered in 2000 in Florida

- Photo of Williams circulated after his disappearance
- Location: Lake Seminole, Florida, U.S.
- Date: December 16, 2000; 25 years ago
- Attack type: Murder by shooting, mariticide, conspiracy
- Victims: Jerry Michael "Mike" Williams, aged 31
- Perpetrators: Brian Winchester (confessed; granted immunity in exchange for testimony); Denise Williams (convicted)
- Charges: Denise Williams: First-degree murder; Conspiracy to commit murder; Accessory after the fact
- Sentence: Life in prison without the possibility of parole plus 30 years (2019; overturned); 30 years in prison (2020)

On December 16, 2000, Jerry Michael "Mike" Williams, a 31‑year‑old man, disappeared during what was believed to be a solo duck‑hunting trip on Lake Seminole, a reservoir on the Georgia–Florida border. His boat was later found abandoned, prompting an extensive search that failed to recover any remains, an outcome unprecedented for drowning cases on the lake. Investigators initially concluded that Williams had drowned and that his body had likely been consumed by alligators. Six months later, waders and a jacket containing his hunting license were recovered, and he was declared legally dead after a petition by his wife, Denise.

Over the following years, concerns emerged about inconsistencies in the alligator‑related explanation. His mother, Cheryl, repeatedly challenged the official findings and urged state authorities to reopen the case. In 2004, the Florida Department of Law Enforcement (FDLE) reopened the investigation, noting that alligators typically do not feed during winter months. However, the lack of a secured crime scene and the absence of new evidence prevented further progress. Additional reviews also failed to produce significant findings, despite continued pressure from the family. The case later gained national attention through a 2012 episode of the Investigation Discovery series Disappeared.

The investigation shifted in 2016 when Brian Winchester — a longtime friend of Williams and later Denise's second husband — was arrested in a seemingly unrelated kidnapping incident involving her. He received a 20‑year sentence the day before the FDLE announced that Williams's remains had been located near Tallahassee in October 2017. The FDLE confirmed that Williams had been murdered.

In May 2018, Denise was arrested and charged with first‑degree murder, conspiracy to commit murder, and accessory. During her 2018 trial, Winchester testified that he had shot Williams at her direction after their initial plan to stage a boating/duck hunting accident failed. She was convicted in December 2018 and sentenced to life in prison in January 2019. In 2020, a Florida appellate court overturned the murder conviction but upheld the conspiracy conviction, for which she is serving a 30‑year sentence.

== Background ==
Jerry Michael Williams was born on October 16, 1969, and was known as Michael or Mike. He grew up in Bradfordville (north of Tallahassee), the son of a Greyhound bus driver and a day care provider who raised him and his older brother Nick in a double-wide trailer. Instead of building a house, the parents saved their money so both boys, who helped by working nights at supermarkets, could attend North Florida Christian High School. There Mike excelled, serving as student council president, playing football and being active in the Key Club. At the age of 15, he began duck hunting as a hobby, and also came to know fellow student Denise Merrell.

After North Florida Christian, he attended Florida State University, where he majored in political science and urban planning. Before graduation, he was hired by Ketcham Appraisal Group as a property appraiser. He distinguished himself as "the hardest-working man I ever saw", according to the company's owner. After he married Merrell in 1994, he would often go home for dinner and return to work after she (and later, his daughter as well) went to bed, and he sometimes went into work after going duck hunting in the morning. According to his mother, Mike was making an annual salary of US$200,000 (equivalent to $374,000 in 2025) at the time of his disappearance. He and Denise had bought a home in a small upscale subdivision on the east side of the city.

In 1999, Williams's only child, a daughter, was born. His coworkers said he was as devoted to her as he was to his work. The following year his father died. Midway through the year, the couple bought a $1 million (equivalent to $1.9 million in 2025) life insurance policy on him through Brian Winchester, a childhood acquaintance of Merrell who had also become best friends with her husband.

Two days before his disappearance, Mike and Denise told his mother, as well as his brother Nick, that they were planning to have another child soon. In 2001, she said, they were planning to go on a cruise in Hawaii that spring; later in the year he expected to travel to Jamaica for work as well.

== Disappearance ==
According to Denise Williams, on the morning of December 16, 2000, a Saturday, her husband awoke early, leaving the house on Centennial Oaks Circle well before dawn, boat in tow, to go duck hunting at Lake Seminole. The lake is a large reservoir approximately 50 mi (80 km) west-northwest of Tallahassee located in the southwest corner of Georgia along its border with Florida, where three other streams merge to form the Apalachicola River. The couple had plans to celebrate their sixth wedding anniversary that night in Apalachicola.

At noon, Denise called her father to tell him that Mike had not returned; Brian Winchester's (Mike's best friend) father drove with Winchester to the areas of the lake where they knew Mike Williams frequently went duck hunting. They found his 1994 Ford Bronco near a remote boat launch in Jackson County, on the Florida side. After investigators with the Florida Fish and Wildlife Conservation Commission (FFWCC) were called, a search began, but soon had to be called off after a storm blew in.

== Search ==
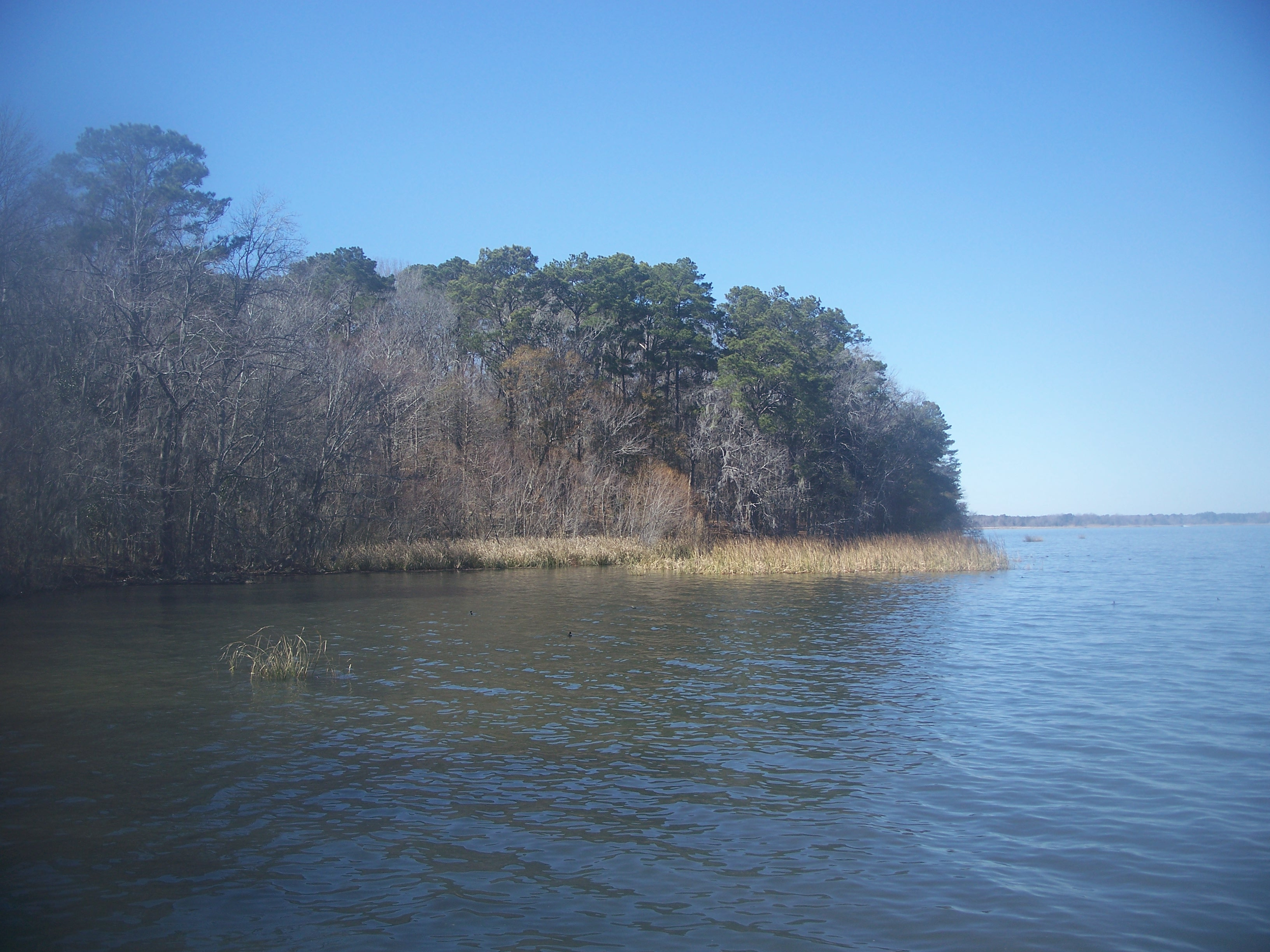
Shoreline on the west side of Lake Seminole

The initial search investigation was handled by the FFWCC. Since it had been reported to them as a missing hunter, the agency handled the case that way, focusing on search and rescue or recovery. "We didn't have a whole lot to go on except there was an empty boat and the guy didn't show up," one of the agency's officers recalled later, after his retirement. "There was nothing there that we had from the scene that suggested foul play at all." Deputies with the Jackson County Sheriff's Office were present, but primarily worked in a support capacity.

Searchers focused on the 10 acres (4.0 ha) of the lake surrounding the cove where Williams's truck was parked. His boat was soon found roughly 225 feet (69 m) from the ramp by a helicopter pilot, who initially assumed it was a boat being used in the search. After retrieving the boat, investigators found Williams's shotgun, still in its case, but no sign of Williams himself.

The cove is locally believed to have been an orchard before the Chattahoochee and Flint rivers and Spring Creek were dammed to create the lake. It took its name, Stump Field, from the many remaining stumps that protruded above and below the water level, requiring careful handling of any powerboat in the area. Searchers thus assumed that Williams had hit a stump with his boat, fallen out, sunk into waters 8–12 feet (2.4–3.7 m) deep when his waders filled, and then drowned when he was unable to extricate himself.

Had Williams drowned, his body would have been expected to eventually float to the surface, making it easier to discover. Investigators assured the Williams family that his body would surface, like other drowning victims, within three to seven days, or perhaps slightly longer due to the cold front that had moved in after the first night's storm. No body was found, however.

Ten days into the search, a camouflage-patterned hunting hat was found, but it could not be connected to Williams. Efforts continued until the search was called off in early February. It has since been suggested that the search might have been continued had Denise Williams indicated an interest in such. At that time, the case was still considered open. "Nothing in investigative or search and rescue efforts has produced any definitive evidence of a boating accident or a fatality as of this date," read the final report, issued in late February 2001.

== Subsequent developments ==
If Williams had drowned after accidentally falling out of his boat, his body would be the only one of 80 known deaths in the lake never to have been found. The head of a private search firm that supplemented official efforts near the end of the search offered a possible explanation. "With the wildlife around, I would guess that the alligators have dismembered and have stored the remains in a location that we would not be able to find," he wrote in a report. Early searchers had reported seeing many of them, and some of the officials were willing to accept the possibility. "Everyone knows the lake is full of alligators," said the FFWCC's David Arnette. "You look for other answers: 'Why hasn't the body appeared?'"

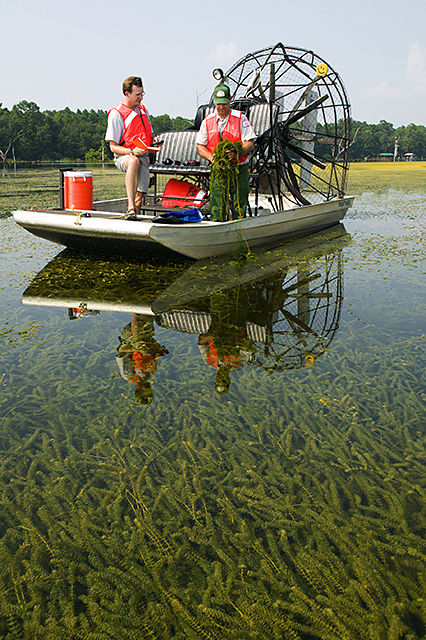
It was suggested that Williams's body could have been caught in the lake's dense underwater hydrilla beds.

It was suggested that perhaps Williams's body had become entangled in the beds of dense hydrilla beneath the lake surface, and then found by the alligators later, with turtles and catfish finishing what they had left behind. Denise Williams, who had avoided media attention during the search for her husband, accepted that her husband had died. She arranged for a memorial service for Mike to be held the day after the search ended.

In June, an angler in the Stump Field area discovered a pair of waders floating in the lake, and divers called to search the area then recovered from the lake bottom a lightweight hunting jacket and a flashlight: in one of the jacket pockets, there was a hunting license with Williams's name and signature. However, there were no teeth marks or any other damage on the waders, none of the recovered items showed signs of having been in the water for anything like the period Williams had been missing, and there was no DNA evidence found to link the clothing to him. Nevertheless, a week later, a Leon County judge granted Denise Williams's petition to have Mike declared legally dead on the basis of those recovered items and an assumption that alligators and other water life had consumed the body in its entirety.

The court decision allowed Denise Williams to immediately proceed with claims on her husband's life insurance policies, from which she received $1.5 million. Five years later, she married Brian Winchester, who had sold Mike some of the policies a few months before he disappeared. The couple went on to live in the same house where Denise and Mike had lived prior. Denise and Brian have mostly declined to discuss the case publicly.

== Later investigations ==
The private search team that surmised the alligator theory had been hired near the end of the original search by Williams's mother, Cheryl. After it ended, and after her son was declared legally dead (proceedings she said in 2008 she would have contested had she been aware of them), she was still not convinced that he had drowned in the lake, but her attempts to bring about a further investigation were unsuccessful. She has stated that she received threats to discourage her. For the next several years, she investigated on her own when not operating a day care at her home. She ran advertisements in local newspapers, and put up billboards seeking information. All the subsequent investigations of the case have resulted from her efforts.

She believed her son might still be alive. "I get criticized a lot for not admitting that Mike's dead," she told the Tallahassee Democrat in 2007. "All I know is I can't stop looking for him until I find him." Her efforts had severely strained her relationship with her former daughter-in-law.

=== 2004 ===
In 2004 the Florida Department of Law Enforcement (FDLE) agreed to reopen the case after lobbying by Cheryl Williams and a friend. It does not normally have jurisdiction in missing-persons cases and cannot get involved in investigations purely on the basis of a citizen's request, although it can offer assistance to local agencies, as it did in this case. In retrospect, many officers agreed with her that the circumstances surrounding Michael Williams' apparent drowning four years before were unusual, and were strongly at odds with that conclusion:

- The boat launch where his Bronco was found, which he would presumably have used to put his boat in the lake, was an undeveloped patch of mud. Yet nearby were finished concrete launches that he was known to have used in the past.
- The storm the night after he was reported missing had westerly winds that should have blown the abandoned, unmoored boat across the lake to the Georgia side.
- When the boat was recovered, its engine was off, yet the gas tank was full. According to a representative of the manufacturer, if the engine had been running when Williams allegedly fell out of the boat, as investigators had theorized, it should have stayed on, with the boat running in circles until its fuel was exhausted. "Something sounds fishy on that deal," the representative said when the situation was described to him.

Investigators also learned that Williams didn't usually hunt alone. "Some things looked unusual right off the bat," said the FFWCC's Arnette, who had initially thought the situation was a typical case involving a missing hunter and a possible boating accident. "Then after a couple, three days and after the weeks went on, those first things looked even more out of place."

==== Alligator theory debunked ====
Doubts that Williams had drowned became much more serious when investigators learned that, in fact, alligators do not generally feed during the winter months due to the colder temperatures. During the search period, daytime temperatures averaged around 55 °F (13 °C), with overnight lows below freezing. Some nights got as cold as 19 °F (−7 °C); a fire was built in a 55-gallon drum on the shore for searchers to stay warm. The water, already at 58 °F (14 °C) the day of Williams's disappearance, dropped to 46 °F (8 °C), and the lake iced out to as much as 20 feet (6.1 m) from shore.

In those conditions, "it [i]s highly unlikely an alligator would have been active" said Matt Aresco, a local herpetologist authorities had consulted. "All they are doing is maintaining their body temperature ... Fifty-eight degrees is too cold for an alligator to be interested in food at all."

As Ronnie Austin—another investigator then with the state's attorney's office—put it, even if an alligator had "defied all known gator behavior" and eaten Williams's body, it would likely have left something behind. Williams was 5 feet 10 inches (1.78 m) and 170 pounds (77 kg). Aresco considers any theory that attributes the missing body to alligators and any other aquatic animals a "stretch ... It would be very, very unusual to have the complete disappearance of a full-grown man."

The waders, discovered almost six months after Williams's disappearance, further undermined the alligator theory. While the diver who retrieved them reported that they were in an area of disturbed weeds with alligator excrement nearby, consistent with the original belief that Williams had drowned while wearing them, he allowed it was "anyone's guess" as to whether they had been later planted in that spot. "These waders, we don't know where they came from," Austin said.

Investigators suspicions' were further raised by the waders' condition—undamaged, without any tooth marks, and lacking any of the residues that would be expected to accumulate on an object submerged in the lake for as long as the waders had supposedly been. Arnette filtered the water in them after they were recovered, and did not find any human remains. The hunting jacket and flashlight were likewise in much better condition than expected, with the latter even working when turned on.

Apart from the condition of the waders was the question of why Williams would have been wearing them when he supposedly fell out of the boat. According to a friend who hunted with him frequently, including one week before his disappearance, Williams took safety very seriously, keeping his guns at work, away from his daughter, among other precautions. On the water, he never put his waders on until he had reached the point where he planned to get out and start hunting, following a common safety procedure in order to avoid the type of accident from which he was later believed to have died. "As much as he preached that to me," the friend said, "why would he be wearing his waders while driving the boat?"

==== Lack of evidence ====
"My gut feeling is Mike did not die in Lake Seminole", Austin said in 2006, after leaving the state's attorney's office for the FDLE. He added that that belief was shared by all the investigators at that point. "I would say this is a suspicious missing person."

However, the new investigation was made extremely difficult by the deficiencies of the original search, when criminal activity had not been considered. "They did not protect the crime scene at all," recalled a Williams family friend with law enforcement experience, who had tended the drum fire during the search. "They botched it." By the time investigators began to realize that they should have asked some more questions, the opportunity was gone. Williams's Bronco and the boat had been returned to his family and friends, the footsteps of the many volunteers and searchers all over the lakeshore had made it impossible to collect any evidence from that area, and the items later recovered from the lake had not been retained.

Without any of that evidence or Williams's body, it was impossible for police to make a case. "[We're] at a brick wall ... pounding our heads against it," said Austin. Derrick Wester, an investigator with the Jackson County sheriff's office, agreed that they were "trying to make up for" not having considered the possibility that things might not have been what they seemed in 2000. His office kept the case open, and had some persons of interest, although he did not identify them.

=== 2007 ===
The FDLE closed its case, convinced that the alligator theory was wrong, but without any leads or evidence that could allow it to further investigate. By 2006, its cold case investigators were no longer returning Cheryl Williams's phone calls. She continued to do what she could to publicize the case, taking out ads in the Tallahassee Democrat.

A possible new lead emerged in October 2007, when Michael Williams's older brother found a photograph and the serial number of a .22-caliber Ruger pistol that had once belonged to their father. Michael had inherited it after his father's death, and after Michael was declared legally dead it was the only one of his firearms that Denise Williams had not returned to her former in-laws. After Jackson County sheriff's investigator, Wester, asked the federal Bureau of Alcohol, Tobacco and Firearms (ATF) to look for it, agents visited Denise and Brian Winchester, now married, in their house (the same one she had lived in with Michael), to interview them.

Several days later, their attorney delivered the gun to the FDLE. It was sent to a state forensics laboratory for DNA testing: the results have not been reported. On the anniversary of Williams's disappearance that year, the Winchesters made one of their few public statements on the case: "For seven years we have prayed and hoped to find out with certainty what happened to Mike," Brian said in an email to the Democrat, and "Nobody wants Mike found more than we do." Rumors were circulating around Tallahassee that a grand jury had been hearing evidence and would soon hand down indictments.

=== 2008 ===
In 2008, the Florida Department of Financial Services's Division of Insurance Fraud (DIF), in conjunction with FDLE, began investigating the case from that angle. Normally, under Florida law, the statute of limitations on that crime is five years, meaning it would have expired in 2005. But it can be extended by three years under certain circumstances.

"The circumstances surrounding this case raise many serious and troubling questions," said DIF's lead attorney, Mark Schlein. Perry, the FFWCC officer who had been heavily involved in the original search, added at the time that if he or any other person investigating had known that there was a large life insurance policy on Williams, and who the beneficiary was, that search might have been handled differently. It was noted that Denise Williams's court petition to have her husband declared legally dead mentioned only the Kansas City Life Insurance Company policies Winchester had sold him, omitting policies through other companies that Michael Williams had obtained through other sources.

However, Brian Jones, an expert in insurance law at Florida State University, told the Democrat that any fraud case would have to rest on more than just those facts already known to have aroused investigative interest. "The mere fact that they can't locate the body isn't necessarily something the insurance industry would care about," he said. But if Michael Williams was to be proven dead and the beneficiary were to have shown to have been involved, or if he was still alive (as his mother and many residents of Jackson County believed possible), then an insurance company would strongly consider pursuing a case.

By the eighth anniversary of Williams's disappearance, however, the DIF had closed the case. "Our job was extremely difficult, and we were simply unable to develop enough evidence to proceed with the investigation," Schlein said. He added that if new information were received, the investigation could be reopened. "We have suspicions, but what we need is evidence."

Another possible lead that year proved fruitless as well. Carrie Cox, a self-described psychic and certified forensic psychological profiler from Kentucky reviewing the case had identified a possible location of Williams's body. She gave investigators the coordinates of a location in Wakulla County near another boat launch. Cadaver dogs were brought to the area and sniffed it out, but found nothing. Cox nevertheless concluded that "we are moving in the right direction... I think something is there." FDLE officials said in 2011 that Cox had not found anything requiring further investigation.

== Cheryl Williams's lobbying efforts ==
Despite the failure of a third investigation to discern the fate of her son, Cheryl Williams persisted. Her efforts led to the Investigation Discovery cable channel, in late 2011, doing a segment on Michael's disappearance and the later investigations. "We don't know what the smoking gun is, but we hope someone will find it," she said.

By then, she had become disillusioned with the FDLE, believing that it was either incompetent or uninterested in resolving the case. In particular, she came to believe the investigation was hampered by the involvement of agent Mike Philips, a friend of both her son and his then-wife. Philips had told her early on in the search that Michael had probably been eaten by alligators, so she had assumed he had been involved in the investigation at that point. He said later he never was and was merely trying to comfort her; FDLE said his involvement was limited to asking his superiors if the agency could help with the search; it did not see a need to formally investigate his role.

Starting on New Year's Day in 2012, Cheryl began writing one letter a day to Governor Rick Scott, asking him to either have another agency besides FDLE investigate or appoint a special prosecutor to do so. After she had written over 200 letters without even an acknowledgment that they had been received, she began inquiring personally as to why. It turned out that the governor's office had forwarded them, unopened, to FDLE's headquarters, where they were placed in the case file. She was outraged. "They could not have hurt me more if they had punched me in the face."

== Brian Winchester's kidnapping of Denise ==
In 2012, Denise and Brian Winchester separated, reportedly due to his sex addiction; she filed for divorce in 2015. Brian opposed it initially and had to be ordered to comply. As part of that order, he was to provide an appraisal of the couple's house, due early in August 2016.

Denise told Leon County Sheriff's Office investigators that, on August 5, the day when the appraisal had to be filed with the court, she left her home to drive to her job at Florida State University. While she was talking on her phone to her sister, she saw someone climb over the back seat of her car. It turned out to be Brian.

He took her phone away and began yelling directions at her. She did not comply until he showed her a gun. She said later that he claimed this was necessary since she was not taking his calls and was blocking his text messages. Instead of going where he wanted her to, she pulled into a CVS drugstore parking lot, close to the door.

Brian told her that he was planning to kill himself with the gun. He did not want the divorce and felt he had nothing to live for if it went through. He assured her he did not want to kill her. She was able to calm him down and took him back to where he had parked his own truck at a nearby park. Before he went to it, he took a tan sheet, a different-colored plastic sheet, a spray bottle of bleach, and a tool from Denise's car.

After she left, Brian pulled up to her and apologized for his actions. Despite her promise to him not to tell police about the incident, she drove straight to them afterwards. According to a friend of Winchester's later interviewed by police, he had been increasingly concerned that as a result of the divorce Denise would tell the police what she knew about "this guy who died 10 or 12 or 15 years ago". She had not answered his many phone calls, so he came up with his plan to wait in her car and hold her at gunpoint.

Brian was arrested and charged with kidnapping, domestic assault, and armed burglary, with two of the charges being felonies. Denise requested protection orders, saying she feared for her life and her daughter's. After a hearing the next week at which she said she could neither eat nor sleep since the incident, the court decided to hold Brian without bond.

Cheryl Williams expressed hope that this development could lead to the resolution of her son's disappearance. "[Brian]'s not going to let Denise run around alone with all that money," she told the New York Daily News. "I'm praying he doesn't commit suicide, I'm praying he'll tell us what actually happened." She added that she is alone among her family in holding out hope that her son is still alive.

At his trial, Winchester's attorney told the court that he was suicidal that day, due to not only the divorce but also his mother's recent terminal cancer diagnosis and the decision by his teenage son from his first marriage to move in with his mother, and argued for the 10-year mandatory minimum. Prosecutors countered that Winchester's actions that day indicated he planned a murder-suicide that was only averted by Denise's quick thinking, and asked the court for the 45-year maximum. In December 2017, Winchester was found guilty and sentenced to 20 years in prison for the kidnapping, with credit for 502 days time served, to be followed by 15 years' probation. As of September 2025, Winchester was imprisoned at the Madison Correctional Institution.

== Discovery of body ==
No mention was made of the Williams case at Brian Winchester's sentencing, although State Attorney Jack Campbell told the media that he hoped the case against Winchester would help authorities solve that disappearance. Later it was reported that he had reached an agreement with prosecutors before the sentencing that they would neither seek a life sentence on the kidnapping charge nor introduce certain evidence at the hearing. What that agreement required of Winchester, if anything, beyond his guilty plea has not been disclosed.

The next day, at a news conference, Mark Perez, the FDLE's special agent in charge, announced to assembled reporters that Williams's body had been found and it had been determined he was the victim of a homicide. However, they declined to release any details of how he had been killed, who might be a suspect or person of interest, or where the body had been found, saying they were withholding that information since only the perpetrators would be expected to know it.

Subsequently, the FDLE revealed they had found Mike Williams's remains at the end of dead-end Gardner Road in northern Leon County, five miles (8.0 km) from where he grew up; they were confirmed as his following a match to his mother's DNA. No other details were provided.

After Denise Williams was arrested, the FDLE disclosed that they had received information on where the body was in early October 2017. County public works employees brought in backhoes for what they were told was a training exercise. After five 16-hour days of digging 9-foot-deep (2.7 m) holes in the mud at that corner of the lake, all the while holding back the lake waters by dams and pumps amid the constant presence of eels and water moccasins, the FDLE was ready to hire a private contractor to finish the job.

On October 18, the team of search dogs and officers finally found Mike Williams's remains in the piles of dirt stacked on plywood sheets. An FDLE source told the Tallahassee Democrat that 98% of his bones were recovered, all very well preserved, as was some of the clothing he had been wearing, such as winter gloves and booties. Two DNA tests matched the remains to his mother's sample.

== Arrest and subsequent trial of Denise Williams ==
On May 8, 2018, Denise Williams was arrested at Florida State University as she left work to celebrate her daughter's 19th birthday, minutes after a grand jury had indicted her on charges of first-degree murder, conspiracy to commit first-degree murder, and accessory after the fact. Prosecutors continued to keep details of the crime to themselves, saying they would share them in court when the time came. They did say that they would seek to have her denied bail.

Denise's attorney declined to comment at that time, saying he had not had time to review the case. Denise's estranged husband, Winchester, was serving his sentence at Wakulla Correctional Institution near Tallahassee; his attorney said his client would take the stand at trial if legally compelled to do so. However, the attorney did not think Winchester would be charged in the case as well.

Two FDLE officers went to Cheryl Williams's house immediately following the indictment to inform her. She did not speak to the media about how she reacted to the news.

The three-page indictment was released two days later. It revealed that prosecutors believed Denise allegedly began conspiring with Winchester in March 2000, nine months before her first husband disappeared. Winchester is alleged to have killed Michael with a gun. The accessory charge suggested that sometime between August 2014 and the day Winchester was sentenced, Denise had allegedly helped Winchester avoid prosecution or arrest for the crime.

Ethan Way, Denise's lawyer, said his client was innocent of all the charges. "[She] had absolutely nothing to do with Mike Williams's disappearance and had absolutely nothing to do with any of the crimes that Brian Winchester committed." He found it convenient that the indictment came after Winchester had been imprisoned for several months. On Denise's behalf, Way entered a plea of not guilty.

=== Trial ===
In late June 2018, Denise Williams was ordered held without bond, with trial date set for September 24. Audio of Brian Winchester's interview with the FDLE was played in court. In it, Brian confessed to pulling the trigger but claims the killing was Denise's idea. Her defense argued that the tape should not have been admitted as evidence since Winchester was not charged with anything despite his admission; the prosecution said it simply asked him to tell the truth about what happened. She went on trial in December.

The state's star witness was Brian Winchester, who testified at length about how he and Denise had never really ended their high school relationship, even after they both married others. Kathy Thomas, Winchester's first wife, told the jury that she had suspected the two of having an affair in the late 1990s, when they frequently double-dated with Mike and Denise. Brian said in his confession, a tape of which was played for the jury, that the affair had started in 1997 and just "snowballed".

After discreetly rekindling the relationship, the two began to consider killing Mike so they could marry, as Denise's family frowned on divorce for religious reasons. Denise suggested staging a boating accident on the Gulf of Mexico where they could throw both Mike and Kathy Thomas overboard, but Winchester did not want to kill his children's mother. After rejecting plans for a murder at Mike's office meant to look like a robbery, Winchester hit on the idea of an apparent hunting accident after he saved Mike from quicksand when the two were hunting in Arkansas.

On the day Mike disappeared, Winchester said, he had enticed him to Lake Seminole. Out on the water, he had gotten Mike to put the waders on, then pushed him out of the boat, thinking he would be unable to resurface and thus would drown. But instead, he managed to get to a tree stump, so Winchester fired a single shotgun blast to the face. Since Mike's death could no longer be passed off as a boating accident, Winchester buried the body where it was later found, then cleaned out his truck and went to a family Christmas party, where he learned that a search was underway. He and Denise took it slow after Mike's "accident", both to let the insurance money earn further interest and to allay any suspicion. The kidnapping that had led to his present imprisonment, he explained, was his reaction to fear that Denise would reveal the truth about what had happened to her first husband now that she and Brian were divorcing.

Prosecutors also played a taped phone conversation in which Kathy Thomas, who was working with police at the time, had told Denise she knew the truth about the crime. Each time she brought it up, Denise attempted to change the subject, but at one point asked "What do you know?" Assistant state attorney Jon Fuchs said this evasiveness, as well as Denise's dispassionate response when Winchester told her how he had killed Mike, demonstrated how cold-bloodedly she helped plan the crime that happened on her behalf.

Way argued in response that there was no physical evidence linking Denise to the crime and that it had been entirely Winchester's idea; he expressed incredulity that Winchester was not on trial despite having admitted to committing the crime himself. After four days of testimony, the jury took eight hours to convict Denise of all the charges. Way said his client would appeal the conviction.

In February 2019, Denise was sentenced to life in prison. She did not speak or offer any argument on her behalf. The only person to address the court besides the lawyers was Cheryl Williams, who said that justice had finally been served, and that Denise had taken not only her son but also her granddaughter from her.

Five months later, Mike and Denise's daughter Anslee was awarded all assets of her mother, including her late father's estate and insurance monies that were due to her mother. Denise signed them over to Anslee to avoid prosecution on three counts of insurance fraud. As part of the deal, Anslee may not use any of the money on her mother's legal fees; if she did, she would owe the state a US$150,000 penalty. As of September 2025, then-55-year-old Denise was imprisoned at the Florida Women's Reception Center.

=== Appeals ===
In January 2020, Denise Williams appealed her conviction and life sentence. Her attorney argued before the Florida First District Court of Appeal that there was no evidence she was involved in the commission of the murder. In November 2020, the murder conviction was overturned, but the conspiracy to commit murder conviction was upheld including the 30-year sentence that accompanied it.

In April 2021, Florida's Attorney General appealed the reversal of Denise's murder conviction to the state's Supreme Court. It cited conflicting precedent and state constitutional provisions. The court declined to hear the appeal.

== In the media ==
In the early 2000s, Cheryl Williams had posted flyers, put up signs, and run newspaper ads soliciting information about the case. One of the ads drew the attention of Jennifer Portman, a reporter at the Tallahassee Democrat. In 2006, after the closure of the first FDLE investigation, she wrote a lengthy story about the case. She followed the story through Denise's conviction, making a point of keeping the poster for the case on her cubicle wall.

In 2011, the case made it into two other media formats. Carrie Cox, the psychic and profiler who had identified a possible burial site at which no body was found, published Alligator Alibi, a lengthy book with documents from the investigation, Cheryl Williams's notes, and her own commentary. She supported it with an eponymous Facebook page, where she regularly publishes whatever updates she can and news about other, similar cases.

Near the end of that year, the Investigation Discovery cable channel series Disappeared devoted an episode to the case. Cheryl Williams promoted it heavily in the days before it aired. Portman, who was interviewed, said she could always tell when it got rerun due to the increase in email she got, many of which asked questions she herself had tried in vain to get authorities to answer. After one such re-airing in 2015, she expressed the hope that "one day ... instead of a question, there will be an answer".

The Crime Junkie podcast featured the case in an episode that was released in early 2019.

On November 13, 2020, True Crime Network featured the case in season 1, episode 11, of Meet, Marry, Murder.

In August 2021, the seventh season premiere of the A&E Network series Cold Case Files featured the case.

NBC's Dateline featured the case as episode 21 of season 27, which first aired on April 9, 2022. The episode was re-run in 2025.

In August 2023, it was the subject of Wondery's 4th season of its podcast series Over My Dead Body.

In October 2024, the case was the subject of the German podcast Plot House first episode, called "Alibi von einem Alligator", which translates from German to "Alibi from an alligator".

In July 2025, the case was the subject of a Hulu four-part docuseries titled Mr. & Mrs. Murder.

== See also ==
- Crime in Florida
- Murder of Brittanee Drexel, 2009 case in South Carolina where eyewitnesses (falsely) claimed her body was disposed of by feeding to alligators
- List of Disappeared episodes
- List of Florida State University people
- List of solved missing person cases (2000s)
- Mariticide, the killing of a man by his wife
