= Marion Correctional Institution =

Marion Correctional Institution can refer to:

- Marion Correctional Institution (Florida)
- Marion Correctional Institution (Ohio)
