= Jennifer Mee =

Convicted murderer known for prolonged, uncontrollable hiccuping (born 1991)

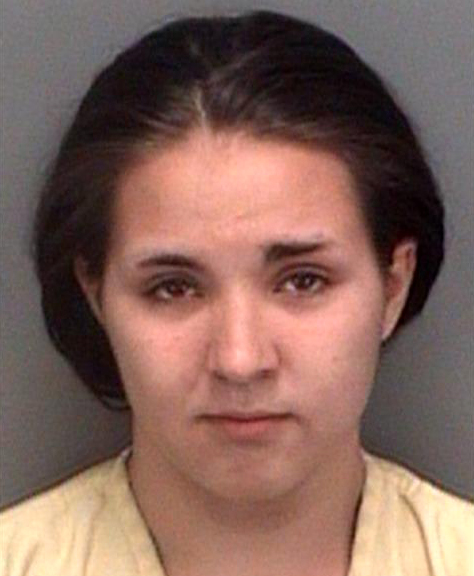
- Mee in 2010
- Born: Jennifer Ann Mee; July 28, 1991 (age 35); St. Petersburg, Florida, U.S.
- Known for: "Hiccup girl"
- Criminal charge: First degree murder
- Penalty: Life in prison without the possibility of parole
- Accomplices: Laron Raiford and Lamont Newton

Details
- Victims: Shannon Griffin
- Imprisoned at: Homestead Correctional Institution

Jennifer Ann Mee (born July 28, 1991) is a convicted American murderer known as the "Hiccup Girl" for her long-lasting case of the hiccups. Mee appeared on national American television shows such as NBC's Today Show many times. Mee was arrested for first-degree murder in 2010. After a trial she was convicted and sentenced to life in prison without parole in 2013. M. William Phelps wrote a book about her that was published in 2016. Her transmutation from "media darling" to convicted murderer attracted renewed national attention.

== "Hiccup girl" case ==
In 2007, when Mee was 15 years old, she gained international fame when she developed a case of uncontrollable hiccups. She appeared on television shows all over the United States hoping to find a cure. Mee claimed to be hiccupping 50 times a minute. National media competed to book her for morning shows. Her "world record" bout of hiccups has been compared to the world record for sneezing. The causes and treatment of her condition were disputed, but her popularity as an internet search item was long lasting. Her search for a hiccup cure included "[ingesting] sugar, peanut butter, breathing in a bag, [and] having people scare her".

Mee continued to get media attention after her hiccups stopped. In June 2007, she ran away from home and it was reported in the newspapers. She later dated a man named Lamont Newton. As she had a plan to find robbery victims online and set them up, Mee recruited Newton and another friend, Laron Raiford, to help her rob victims.

== Crime ==
In 2010, Mee met up with Shannon Griffin, a 22-year-old man she encountered online. She invited Griffin to a vacant home where two of Mee's friends robbed him of less than $50 and shot Griffin, killing him. As an accomplice to the crime, Mee was charged with murder.

After meeting Griffin, Mee led him around to the back of a vacant home where her two friends (Laron Raiford and Lamont Newton) were waiting with a .38 caliber handgun. The victim was shot four times, but police did not know which suspect did the shooting.

Mee, Raiford, and Newton all lived together and were arrested within hours of the crime. According to Sergeant Skinner of the St. Petersburg Police Department, Mee and her accomplices admitted to their involvement in the crime.

=== Trial ===
Prior to the trial, Mee's lawyer, John Trevena, offered to have Mee plead guilty in exchange for a 15-year sentence. Laron Raiford had been offered a sentence of 40 years in exchange for a guilty plea, but he rejected the deal.

During the trial, the prosecution played a recording of a jailhouse phone call between Mee and her mother. During the call, Mee told her mother, "I didn't kill nobody...I set everything up. It all went wrong, Mom. It [expletive] just went downhill after everything happened, Mom." Also, experts testified that Mee's DNA was found on the victim's shirt. Mee's lawyer claimed his client had schizophrenia. The judge ordered a psychological evaluation; however, it was determined that Mee was competent to stand trial. Another defense used by her lawyer was that Mee's hiccups were a symptom of Tourette's syndrome.

In 2013, Mee was found guilty of felony murder and sentenced to life in prison without parole. Her co-defendants – Laron Raiford and Lamont Newton – were both convicted of first-degree murder and also sentenced to life in prison.

Mee's attorney moved for a new trial, which was subsequently denied. Her sentence was criticized in an article in the Hastings Women's Law Journal as purportedly disparate from that which would be imposed upon a similarly situated male.

== See also ==
- Ryan Holle - Criminal defendant whose case involved a controversial interpretation of the felony murder rule; sentence commuted by Florida's governor.
- Doug Gilding - Criminal defendant whose case involved a controversial interpretation of the felony murder rule; incarcerated since 1997.
- Murder in Florida law
