= Bob Jones (defensive back) =

American football player (born 1951)

No. 32, 40
- Position: Defensive back

Personal information
- Born: February 10, 1951; Boardman, Florida, U.S.
- Died: December 7, 2023 (aged 72)
- Listed height: 6 ft 1 in (1.85 m)
- Listed weight: 194 lb (88 kg)

Career information
- High school: Fessenden (Ocala, Florida)
- College: Virginia Union (1969–1972)
- NFL draft: 1973: 6th round, 146th overall pick

Career history
- Cincinnati Bengals (1973–1974); Atlanta Falcons (1975–1976)
- Stats at Pro Football Reference

Bob Jones (February 10, 1951 – December 7, 2023) was an American professional football defensive back who played four seasons in the National Football League (NFL) with the Cincinnati Bengals and Atlanta Falcons. He played college football at Virginia Union and was selected by the Bengals in the sixth round of the 1973 NFL draft.

== Early life and college ==
Bob Jones was born on February 10, 1951, in Boardman, Florida. He attended Fessenden High School in Ocala, Florida. He participated in football, basketball, track, and volleyball in high school.

He was a member of the Virginia Union Panthers of Virginia Union University from 1969 to 1972. He earned All-American honors while at Virginia Union.

== Professional career ==
Jones was selected by the Cincinnati Bengals in the sixth round, with the 146th overall pick, of the 1973 NFL draft. He signed with the Bengals in 1973 and played in nine games for the team during the 1973 season. He appeared in all 14 games in 1974. He was released by the Bengals in 1975.

Jones signed with the Atlanta Falcons in 1975 and played in all 14 games for the Falcons during the 1975 season, catching one pass for 25 yards. He appeared in all 15 games again in 1976, returning one kick for 22 yards and one punt for negative one yard. He was released by the Falcons on September 14, 1977.

== Personal life ==
After his NFL career, Jones worked at Super-Valu Foods and for the Clayton County, Georgia government. He was also an NCAA and Georgia high school football referee for over 20 years. He died on December 7, 2023.
