= Murder of Audreanna Zimmerman =

2010 murder of a 19-year-old girl in Ensley, Florida

- Audreanna Zimmerman
- Location: Pensacola, Florida, United States
- Date: March 24, 2010
- Attack type: Murders by arson and beating
- Victims: Audreanna Redawn Zimmerman, 19
- Verdict: Guilty
- Convictions: First-degree premeditated murder (Brown); First-degree murder and kidnapping (Miller); Second-degree murder (Lee)
- Sentence: Death (Brown); Life imprisonment (Miller); 25 years' imprisonment (Lee)
- Convicted: Tina Lasonya Brown, 39; Heather Trinee Lee, 27; Britnee Angelique Miller, 16

On March 24, 2010, in Pensacola, Florida, United States, 19-year-old Audreanna Redawn Zimmerman (April 13, 1990 – April 9, 2010) was attacked by three women, who beat her with a crowbar, shocked her with a stun gun, and set her on fire. Zimmerman died 16 days after the attack from severe burn injuries. The three perpetrators – Tina Lasonya Brown (born July 19, 1970), Heather Trinee Lee (born July 13, 1982; Brown's neighbor) and Britnee Angelique Miller (born June 2, 1993; Brown's daughter) – were all arrested and charged with Zimmerman's murder.

Brown was found guilty of first-degree premeditated murder and sentenced to death. Miller, who was 16 at the time, received a life sentence after pleading guilty to murder and kidnapping. Lee entered into a plea agreement and therefore sentenced to 25 years in prison. Brown is the only female death row inmate in Florida and is incarcerated at the Lowell Correctional Institution, while Lee and Miller are imprisoned at the Gadsden Correctional Facility and Lowell Correctional Institution, respectively.

== Attack and death ==
Prior to the assault on March 24, 2010, the victim, Audreanna Redawn Zimmerman, was acquainted with her killers, Tina Lasonya Brown, her daughter Britnee Angelique Miller, and their neighbor Heather Trinee Lee. All four women lived in neighboring trailers in an Escambia County mobile home park. However, the relationship between Brown, Miller and Zimmerman deteriorated by 2010. On one occasion, Miller caught Zimmerman having a sexual relationship with Miller's boyfriend. Miller attempted to strike Zimmerman over this, and Zimmerman used a stun gun on Miller in self-defense.

Several days after the stun gun incident, Brown invited Zimmerman to her home under the guise of rekindling their friendship. Upon Zimmerman's arrival, she was attacked by Brown, Miller and Lee. Brown beat Zimmerman with a crowbar and used a stun gun to shock her several times. Afterwards, the trio abducted Zimmerman by dragging her into a car and brought her to a nearby forest. They doused Zimmerman with gasoline and set her on fire.

After the attack, Zimmerman, who was left for dead, escaped to a nearby home and called 911. She was transported to a hospital in Mobile, Alabama, with severe burns across 60 percent of her body. Despite her injuries, Zimmerman was able to provide the authorities with the identities of her attackers. However, 16 days after the attack, Zimmerman died in the hospital on April 9, 2010. The cause of death was multiple thermal injuries.

Upon Zimmerman's death, her attackers were charged with first-degree premeditated murder (which attracts a potential sentence of capital punishment in Florida) and detained in police custody.

== Trial proceedings ==
=== Heather Trinee Lee ===
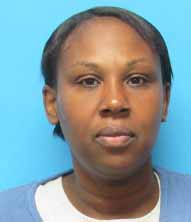
Heather Trinee Lee

On November 3, 2011, Heather Lee reached a plea agreement with the prosecution, and pleaded guilty to a second-degree murder charge. As a condition of her plea bargain, Lee agreed to testify against her co-defendants. The death penalty was taken off the table.

On July 20, 2012, Lee was sentenced to 25 years in prison.

=== Tina Lasonya Brown ===
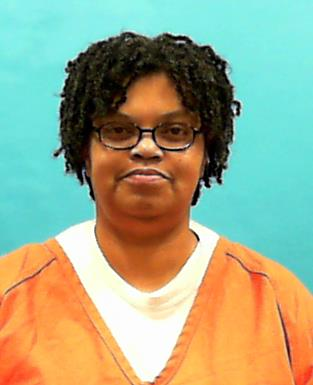
Tina Brown

Tina Brown was the second of the three perpetrators to stand trial for the murder of Audreanna Zimmerman. Brown stood trial before an Escambia County jury on June 18, 2012. Closing arguments were made three days later. That same day, the jury found Brown guilty of first-degree murder. The jury reportedly deliberated for an hour before they returned with the guilty verdict. On June 26, 2012, the same jury returned with their verdict on sentence, unanimously recommending the death penalty for Brown, who purportedly apologized to the family of the victim in court.

On September 28, 2012, Judge Gary Bergosh sentenced Brown to death after accepting the jury's death penalty recommendation.

The Assistant State Attorney was Bridgette Jensen, who was known for sending several infamous killers to prison, including death row.

=== Britnee Angelique Miller ===
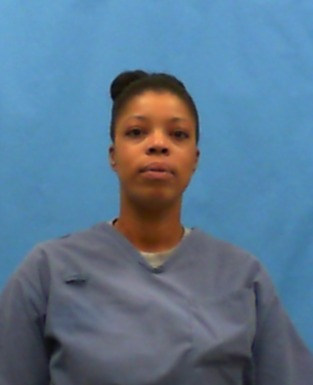
Britnee Miller

Britnee Miller was the final perpetrator to stand trial for the murder of Audreanna Zimmerman. Miller pleaded guilty to the charge of first-degree murder, but as she was below 18 at the time of the offense, she would not face the death penalty. The only possible sentence was life imprisonment. On May 7, 2013, Miller was sentenced to life in prison without the possibility of parole.

== Appeal process ==
=== Miller ===
In March 2017, Miller appealed to withdraw her guilty plea. She argued that she was a juvenile at the time of the trial, and hence she had not understood when she entered her plea that she could still be sentenced to life. Miller also stated that under the plea agreement, she was entitled to withdraw her plea of guilt if the U.S. Supreme Court decided that life in prison was in any way permissible for juveniles; at that time, the U.S. Supreme Court was deliberating and ultimately ruled that juveniles should not be required to serve mandatory life sentences without parole for offenses attracting such a punishment. The prosecution countered that based on the terms of her agreement, Miller could only withdraw her plea if the U.S. Supreme Court's decision was not beneficial to Miller's case. That same month, the courts rejected Miller's bid to rescind her guilty plea.

In October 2017, Miller's re-sentencing trial began before a trial court in Florida. During the hearing, the defense presented psychiatric reports and other exhibits to argue for a sentence lower than life. It was adduced from the defense's evidence that Miller committed the crime out of a deep desire for her mother's approval, and that Miller was a victim of trauma caused by childhood abuse, abandonment, and sexual exploitation, which were among the defense's points of submission for a lenient sentence.

On November 6, 2017, Circuit Judge Gary Bergosh again sentenced Miller to life imprisonment. In light of her juvenile status, Miller was allowed to have her first sentencing review in 15 years. On April 3, 2019, the Florida First District Court of Appeal affirmed the reinstatement of Miller's life sentence.

=== Brown ===
On May 15, 2014, the Florida Supreme Court dismissed Tina Brown's appeal against her death sentence and murder conviction. On July 8, 2014, a second appeal by Brown to the Florida Supreme Court was also rejected. On December 1, 2014, the U.S. Supreme Court rejected Brown's appeal.

In 2018, Brown filed another appeal. She argued that her original trial counsel was ineffective, added that Lee had more culpability in the crime, and stated that some of the jurors should have been dismissed for various reasons.

On April 5, 2019, Circuit Judge Gary L. Bergosh denied Brown's appeal and stated that Brown did not provide supporting evidence to prove her claims or how they would have impacted the outcome of his trial. On August 27, 2020, Brown's sixth appeal to the Florida Supreme Court was dismissed.

By 2023, Brown filed a post-conviction motion, attempting to vacate her conviction and sentence. In the appeal, Brown's lawyers argued that a key witness against Brown, Corie Doyle, had lied on the witness stand at the behest of one of Heather Lee, and her disputed credibility raised doubts over the validity of her death sentence. On May 10, 2024, Circuit Judge Gary Bergosh rejected Brown's appeal, ruling that the new evidence did not raise a reasonable doubt over the conviction of Brown. A further appeal to the Supreme Court of Florida was denied on July 16, 2026, affirming the sentence of death.

On September 9, 2026, Brown filed another appeal to overturn her death sentence on the grounds that she was wrongfully condemned to die due to gender bias. Escambia County Chief Judge John Simon heard the appeal and rejected it on September 25, 2026. In response, Brown filed a follow-up appeal to the Florida Supreme Court on October 23, 2026.

== Other developments and aftermath ==
=== Brown's death row status ===
By early 2017, Tina Brown was one of five women held on death row at the Lowell Correctional Institution in Florida. The other four were: Emilia Carr, Ana Maria Cardona, Margaret Allen and Tiffany Cole. By March 2023, only Brown, Allen and Cole remained on death row, after the commutation of Cardona's and Carr's death sentences. In August 2023, Cole's death sentence was revoked and she was re-sentenced to life imprisonment without parole by the jury's majority decision of 10–2, leaving Allen and Brown the last two women under a death sentence in Florida.

On December 13, 2024, the only other woman on death row, Margaret Allen, died of natural causes at the age of 58 while on death row. As of 2026, Brown is still on death row at the Lowell Correctional Institution.

=== Status of Miller and Lee ===
As of 2025, Lee is incarcerated at the Gadsden Correctional Facility. Her projected release date is September 2, 2031.

Miller is serving her life sentence at the Lowell Correctional Institution as of 2025.

== See also ==
- Capital punishment in Florida
- List of death row inmates in the United States § Florida
- List of women on death row in the United States § Florida
