= Lowell Correctional Institution =

Women's prison in Marion County, Florida

Coordinates: 29°18′49″N 82°12′05″W

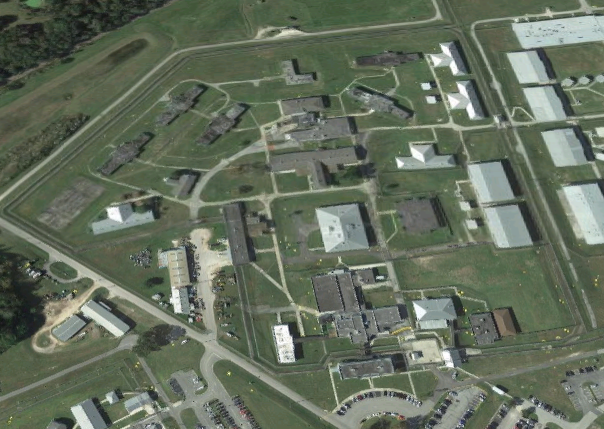
- LOWCI overhead view
- Interactive map of Lowell Correctional Institution
- Location: 11120 NW Gainesville Rd Ocala, Florida
- Status: Operational
- Security class: Minimum, medium, close, and maximum
- Capacity: 2,610 = 968 (main) + 394 (satellite) + 1,248 (annex)
- Population: 2,407 = 698 (main) + 290 (satellite) + 1,419 (annex) (May 2023)
- Opened: April 23, 1956
- Former name: Florida Correctional Institution
- Managed by: Florida Department of Corrections
- Warden: Shellie Baker

Lowell Correctional Institution (LOWCI) is a women's prison in Marion County, Florida, north of Ocala, in the unincorporated area of Lowell. A part of the Florida Department of Corrections, it serves as the primary prison for women in the state. As of May 2023, 2,407 women were incarcerated in the main facility, work camp, and the Lowell Annex (LOWAN), making it the largest prison for women in the United States; its prison population became larger than that of the Central California Women's Facility in 2019.

LOWCI opened in April 1956 as the Florida Correctional Institution at Lowell and was the first Florida prison for women. It houses community, minimum, medium, and close-custody inmates.

Lowell Correctional Institution has a history of alleged inmate abuse, sexual assault, inhumane conditions, and minimal intervention from the Florida State Department of Corrections. Inmates have shared their experiences on social media, describing overcrowding, inadequate medical care, and severe illness among some inmates.

== History ==
Before the women's prison opened, women sentenced to state custody in Florida were held in segregated units at the state prison at Raiford.

Juvenile girls were held separately and along racial lines. The Florida Industrial School for Girls was established by the legislature in 1915 and opened in 1917 on a tract of land near Ocala; it admitted white girls, and in 1929 the legislature appropriated funds for a segregated cottage for Black girls. An expansion of the school known as Forest Hills opened for Black girls on December 1, 1952, on the site that later became part of the Lowell prison complex; in 1953 the legislature appropriated money for the adult portion of the female correctional institution at Lowell. The girls' school, later renamed the McPherson School, closed on December 31, 1984, and Marion County purchased the property in 1986.

=== Growth ===
The Forest Hills School for Girls, previously belonging to the Florida Department of Health and Rehabilitative Services, was added to Florida C.I. in 1973. The Levy Forestry Camp was added in 1995 with a primary mission of providing labor for the Division of Forestry. In July 1997, C.A.M.P. Jones was opened as the only "boot camp"- style program for young female offenders in Florida. In 1998, Florida C.I. was combined with Marion C.I., changing the name to Lowell C.I. / Women's Unit. Then in 2000, the prison was renamed Lowell C.I. and began housing youthful pregnant offenders.

At some point the Broward Correctional Institution housed female death row inmates. Lowell Annex opened in April 2002. The female death row was moved to Lowell Annex in February 2003.

In 2009, renovations of Lowell Correctional Institution started. The first phase was completed and (2) 180-bed open bay dormitories were placed online in the Summer of 2009. With the opening of these two dorm, several older dorms were taken out of service. In the Fall of 2009, Phase Two began and several mission changes were put into effect, elderly inmates were moved to climate controlled dormitories at the Lowell Correctional Institution Annex and the primary dormitory where wheelchair-using inmates were housed was demolished to make way for a new food service and canteen buildings. Another mission that has changed in 2009, is Lowell Correctional Institution's housing of Pregnant Inmates. In 2009 the Department of Corrections completed a climate-controlled facility in South Florida to house long term pregnant inmates. Inmates in the final term of their pregnancy will remain housed at Lowell Correctional Institution. There are an additional (2) open bay dorms and (2) secure-cell housing units planned to begin in the final phase of the renovations.

In 2010, the Lowell Correctional Institution Annex completed a (1) 240-bed secure-cell housing unit. This dormitory houses inmates that the department has classified as security risks and require housing in cells instead of dormitory bunks.

In 2012, Lowell Reception Center, was scheduled to be revealed. This stand-alone facility will take over the Reception and Orientation mission from the Annex. Also scheduled to be opened at the Lowell Reception Center is a Crisis Care/Transitional Care Unit that will house inmates that require inpatient mental health treatment. The projected inmate population once these units are complete will be approximately 4000 housed within the 6 units that Lowell Correctional Institution will encompass.

=== Miami Herald series and abuse allegations ===
In 2015 the Miami Herald announced it was going to publish an investigative series, "Beyond Punishment," on Lowell CI, alleging misconduct. The newspaper published a short video with the same title. The FLDC criticized the newspaper, stating that it had worked with the newspaper previously. It provided a statement in advance to the newspaper.

In 2020 the United States Department of Justice stated that an investigation found that widespread victimization occurred at Lowell.

In August 2019, 52-year-old Cheryl Weimar was viciously beaten by correctional officers in an attack that left her a quadriplegic. She won a settlement for 4.65 million dollars and was granted conditional release. Captain Keith Mitchell Turner was later terminated from employment after being arrested on charges related to molesting two children, but not for his role in the attack. A second officer, Ryan Dionne, was allowed to resign after being implicated in the attack.

== Facilities ==
Lowell Correctional Institution houses female offenders at all security levels, including juveniles age 14 to 18 and adults. The Lowell Annex, under the supervision of the Lowell Correctional Institution, houses an inmate reception center. It also houses close security and death row inmates.

The Levy Forestry Camp, a forestry work camp located 30 miles (48 km) away in Bronson, was under the supervision of Lowell Correctional Institution until it was defunded and closed in 2012. This camp provided labor for the Florida Division of Forestry, while it was in operation.

== Tuberculosis outbreak ==
In July 2005, 3,100 prisoners and 800 staff members were tested at Lowell Correction Institution for tuberculosis. Prison officials confirmed seven cases and no fatalities. State and local officials were unsure how the infection was brought into the facility.

== Notable inmates ==
- Sarah Boone — sentenced in December 2024 to life without parole for the second-degree murder of Jorge Torres.
- Emilia Carr — convicted of the murder of Heather Strong; sentenced to death in 2011 and resentenced to life without parole in 2017.
- Tiffany Cole — convicted of the 2005 kidnapping and murder of a Jacksonville couple; sentenced to death in 2008 and resentenced to life without parole in August 2023.
- Dalia Dippolito — sentenced in 2017 to 16 years for soliciting the murder of her husband.
- Katherine Magbanua — sentenced to life without parole for her role in the murder of Florida State University law professor Dan Markel.
- Ashley McArthur — sentenced in 2019 to life imprisonment for the first-degree murder of Taylor Wright, a private investigator and former police officer.
- Jennifer Mee — sentenced in 2013 to life without parole for felony murder.
- Dorice "Dee Dee" Moore — sentenced in 2012 to life without parole for the murder of lottery winner Abraham Shakespeare.
- Julie Schenecker — sentenced in 2014 to life imprisonment for the murders of her two children.
- Courtney Schulhoff — convicted in 2006 of the first-degree murder of her father; resentenced in 2017 to 40 years.
- Tammy Lynn Sytch — professional wrestling personality known as "Sunny" and WWE Hall of Fame inductee, sentenced in November 2023 to 17 years for DUI manslaughter and related offenses; transferred to Lowell in February 2024.
- Rachel Wade — sentenced in 2010 to 27 years for the second-degree murder of Sarah Ludemann.

=== Inmates on Death Row ===
Current

- Tina Lasonya Brown - sentenced to death for torturing and murdering 19-year-old Audreanna Zimmerman.

Former

- Margaret Allen - sentenced to death for torturing and murdering her housekeeper, Wenda Wright. Died on death row in 2024.

== See Also ==
- Incarceration of women in the United States
- List of women on death row in the United States
