= Doug Gilding =

American convicted murderer

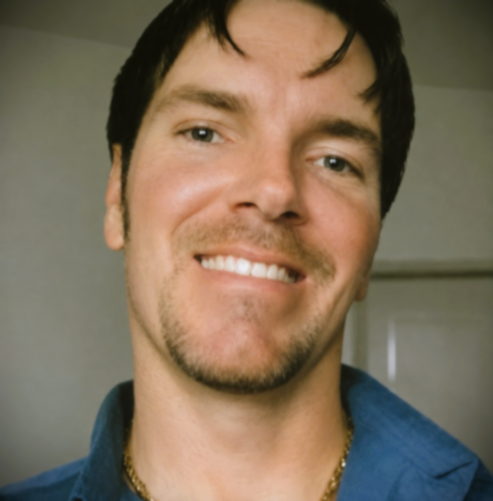
- Born: May 23, 1972 (age 54); Portland, Maine, United States
- Status: Incarcerated on Interstate Transfer at Maine State Prison
- Convictions: Conspiracy to Robbery; Armed Robbery; Felony Causing Injury (2); First Degree Felony Murder
- Penalty: Life imprisonment without the possibility of parole
- Website: freedouggilding.com

Douglas Gilding (born May 23, 1972) is an incarcerated American prison reform advocate whose 1997 arrest and subsequent conviction under Florida's felony murder rule has become a subject of national legal and academic scrutiny. Gilding is currently serving a sentence of life without the possibility of parole for his peripheral involvement in a 1997 robbery and fatal shooting at a pub in Longwood, Florida, United States. Although he was not physically present at the scene of the crime, Gilding was given a life-without-parole sentence as a "non-present principal" under Florida's felony murder law.

While incarcerated over the last three decades, Gilding has advocated for abolishing or amending the felony murder doctrine. He authored the proposed "Ryan Holle Reform Act" legislation aimed at preventing non-present participants from receiving life sentences under Florida's felony murder law. Gilding's conviction and advocacy have received national media coverage, and his case was selected for investigation by Georgetown University's "Making an Exoneree" program.

== Early life and education ==
According to Gilding, he "grew up in a small town in Maine". He played basketball and ran track at Deering High School in Portland, Maine, graduating in 1990; then went to college at the University of South Florida.

== Incident ==
In the early morning hours of May 15, 1997, two men burst into Suzanne's Oyster Reef and Pub at closing time. One of them fired a shot into the ceiling, as they demanded wallets, jewelry, and car keys. Witnesses described the robbers as black, in their early 20s, and 5 feet 11 inches to 6 feet tall. They were later identified as Juan Smallwood and Thomas Chenault.

During the course of the robbery, four patrons were pistol-whipped, and one was shot in the leg. At one point, a patron got into a struggle with Chenault, who had the gun. Smallwood, who had a knife, stabbed the patron. Rufus Morse, employed as the cook at Suzanne's, came out of the bathroom and startled Chenault, who shot Morse in the head, killing him instantly. Patrons began throwing bottles at the robbers, who then fled the bar.

== Trials and convictions ==
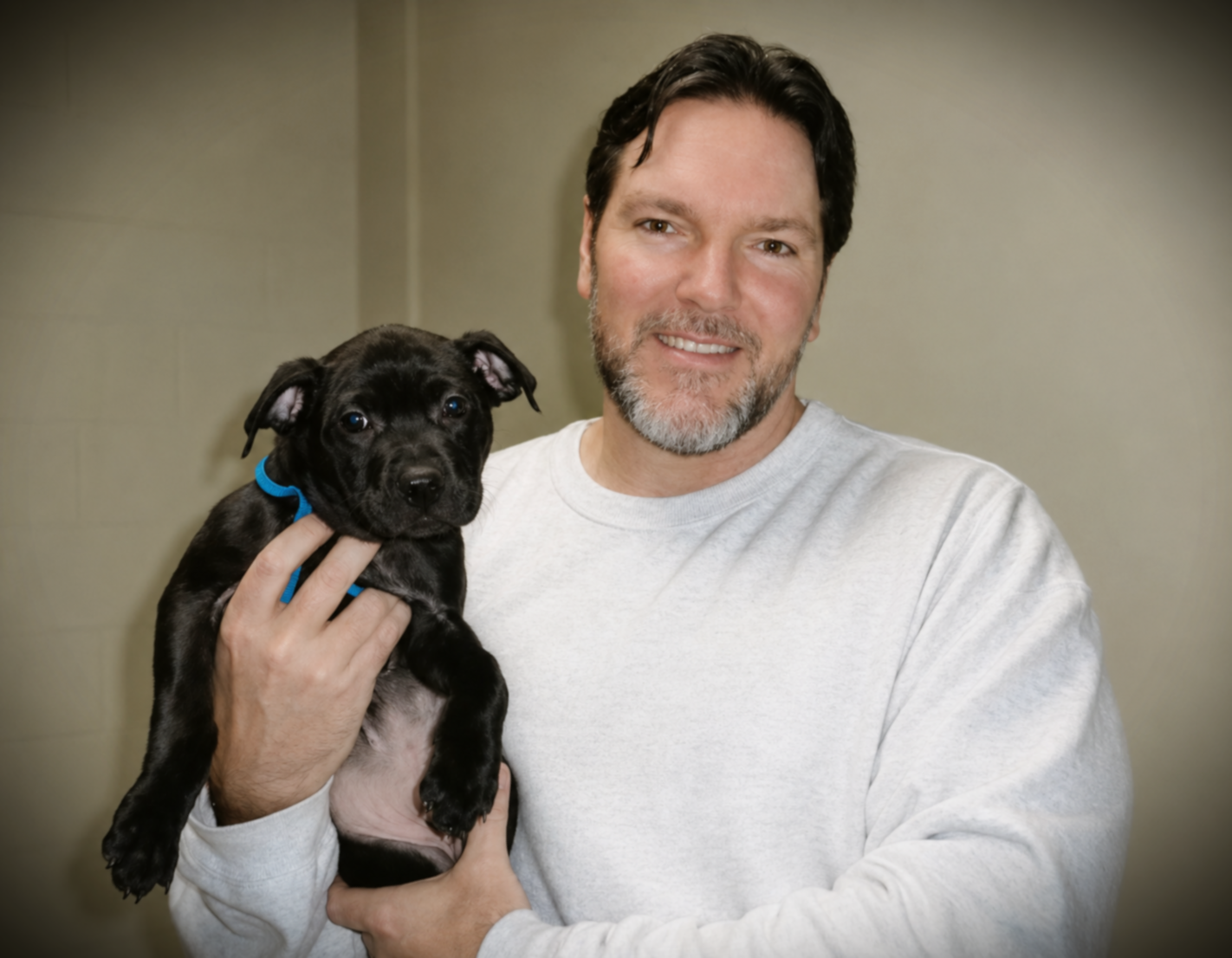
Doug Gilding with program puppy "Gidget"

After their arrest two weeks later, Smallwood and Chenault confessed to investigators. In addition, a third man, Michael Stafford, confessed to providing the weapons and driving the getaway car. The three robbers identified two other men as being involved in the planning of the robbery: Gilding, and his roommate John Fisher.

Gilding was arrested on June 6, 1997 in Seminole County. After turning down a 4-year plea deal that would have required him to testify against his co-defendants, Gilding was found guilty at a jury trial for helping plan the robbery during a 10-minute conversation in his roommate's car. Following his arrest, Gilding maintained his innocence and asserted that he was merely a passenger in the car. He was given a life-without-parole sentence under Florida's felony murder law.

According to testimony, on the night before the robbery, Fisher, driving his van, with Gilding as the passenger, met up with Stafford, Chenault, and Smallwood in a parking lot down the road from Suzanne's. According to Fisher and Stafford's trial testimony, the five of them sat in Fisher's van and discussed the layout of Suzanne's and the location of the safe and drugs. After an approximately 10-minute conversation, Stafford, Chenault, and Smallwood got back into their own vehicle and drove off. Shortly thereafter, Fisher and Gilding returned to their apartment and were home in bed sleeping in a different county when the robbery and murder were committed.

Gilding, Smallwood, and Chenault all went to trial, and although prosecutors had originally been seeking the death penalty, they received life-without-parole sentences. Stafford and Fisher avoided the death penalty by taking plea deals in exchange for their testimony against the other co-defendants.

Stafford pleaded guilty to manslaughter and received 15 years in prison for his role as the getaway driver and for providing the weapons used in the robbery. He was released in 2010. Originally facing the death penalty for being a principal planner of the robbery, Fisher pleaded guilty to accessory-after-the-fact and received 4-and-a-half years in prison. He was released in 2001.

=== Application of the felony murder rule ===
Gilding, who was not present when the robbery was committed, was charged as a "non-present principal" to first degree murder under a legal doctrine known as the felony murder rule. This doctrine allows persons to be held liable for a murder committed by a co-defendant, even if the person was not present when the murder occurred or the death was accidental.

The felony murder rule originated in English common law, though it was abolished in England in 1957. The United States is the only developed nation that retains the doctrine. The doctrine has been completely abolished in England, Canada, Ireland, and most of Europe. Legal scholars and publications, including the American Criminal Law Review, have criticized the application of the rule in cases where peripheral participants, such as non-present co-conspirators or getaway drivers, receive life sentences for murders they did not personally commit. Law professor Abbe Smith of Georgetown University has argued that this type of sentence should be reserved for the most heinous criminals, not peripheral players; and said in an interview that "felony murder laws lead to lots of injustices, they lead to lesser accomplices doing more time than the primary" perpetrators.

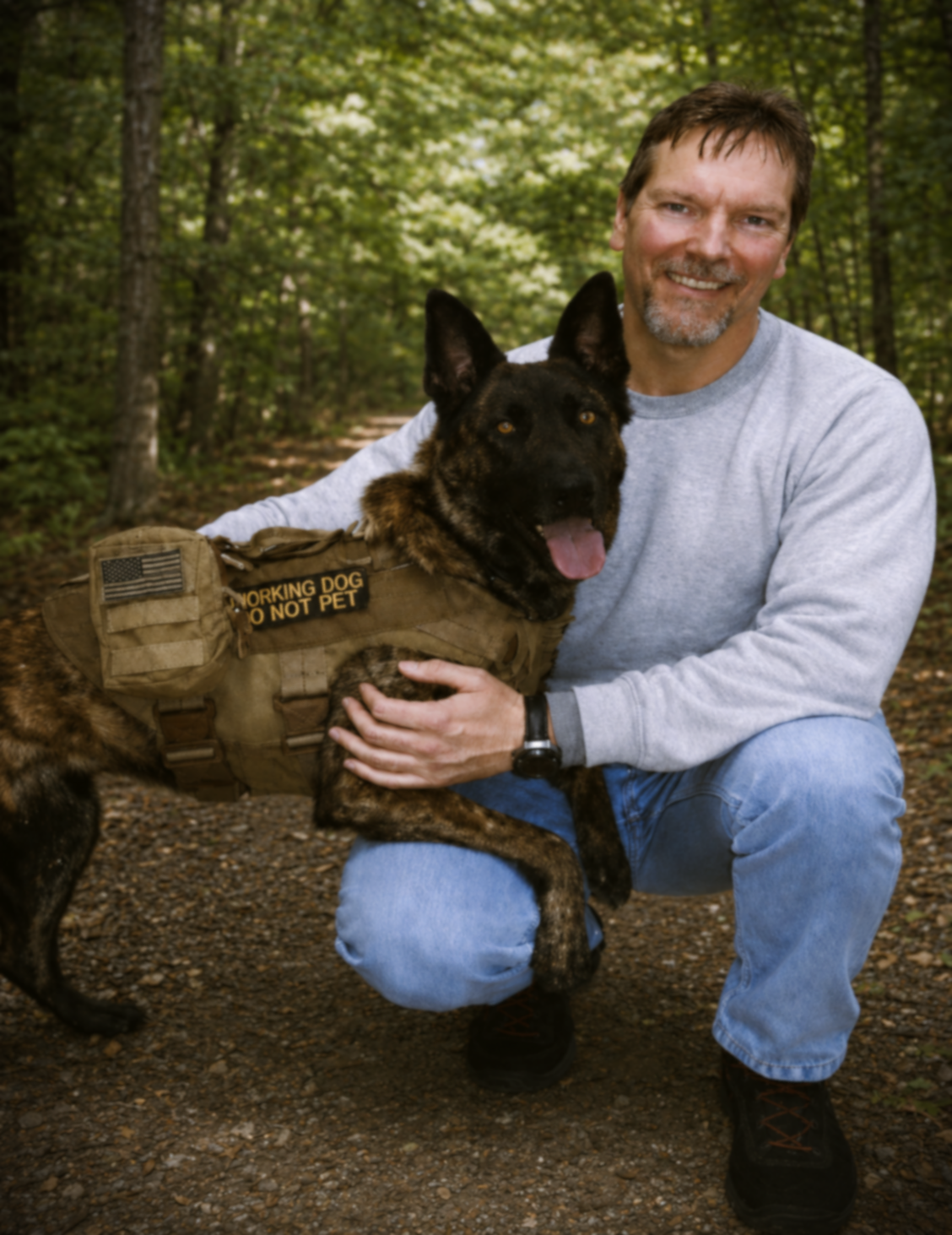
Doug Gilding with service dog trainee "Millie"

In Gilding's case, because he was convicted as a non-present co-conspirator to the robbery, under Florida's felony murder rule, he was found to be legally liable for the murder committed by Chenault. Gilding was never charged with actually committing the robbery, and the record shows he was home in a different county when the crime occurred.

=== Trial ===
Shortly after his arrest on June 6, 1997, Gilding refused a 4-year plea deal where he would have been required to testify against his co-defendants, which was later offered to, and accepted by, Fisher. Gilding's trial lasted five days, during which his attorneys requested a mistrial based on perjury committed on the witness stand by Stafford.

Before Gilding's trial, Assistant State Attorney Charles Tabscott filed a motion to withdraw Michael Stafford's plea deal and re-charge him with first-degree murder. Tabscott argued that Stafford had fabricated testimony in depositions to minimize his involvement in the crime. In addition, Tabscott argued, Stafford was "making himself useless as a state witness against his four co-defendants". The judge acknowledged inconsistencies in Stafford's testimony but declined to throw out the plea deal, instructing the prosecution and Stafford to resolve the discrepancies. Tabscott subsequently called Stafford as a key witness for the prosecution in Gilding's trial.

Shortly after his attempt to withdraw Stafford's plea deal failed, Tabscott offered John Fisher, who had been facing the death penalty, the same 4-year plea deal that Gilding had earlier refused, in exchange for his testimony against Gilding. Fisher accepted the offer. Both Stafford and Fisher testified that Gilding had been involved in planning the robbery.

On the third day of Gilding's trial, Stafford's testimony regarding the events leading up to the robbery changed again. Gilding's defense attorneys claimed perjury and moved for a mistrial, arguing on the record that the prosecution was knowingly presenting false testimony. Trial Judge O.H. Eaton Jr. asked Tabscott if he thought Stafford was telling the truth, to which the prosecutor replied "I am not going to answer that question".

Judge Eaton allowed the case and credibility issues to proceed to the jury. Gilding's attorneys argued that Stafford and Fisher were the principal planners of the robbery, pointing to the shifting nature of Stafford's statements. Gilding's defense attorneys argued to the jury that Stafford's statements had changed over time to minimize his own involvement while implicating Gilding. After deliberations, the jury found Gilding guilty on all counts. On April 8, 1999, Gilding was sentenced to: 5 years in prison for conspiracy to commit robbery; natural life without parole as a non-present principal to first-degree felony murder; and 30 years as a non-present principal to robbery and both counts of felony causing injury.

== Imprisonment ==
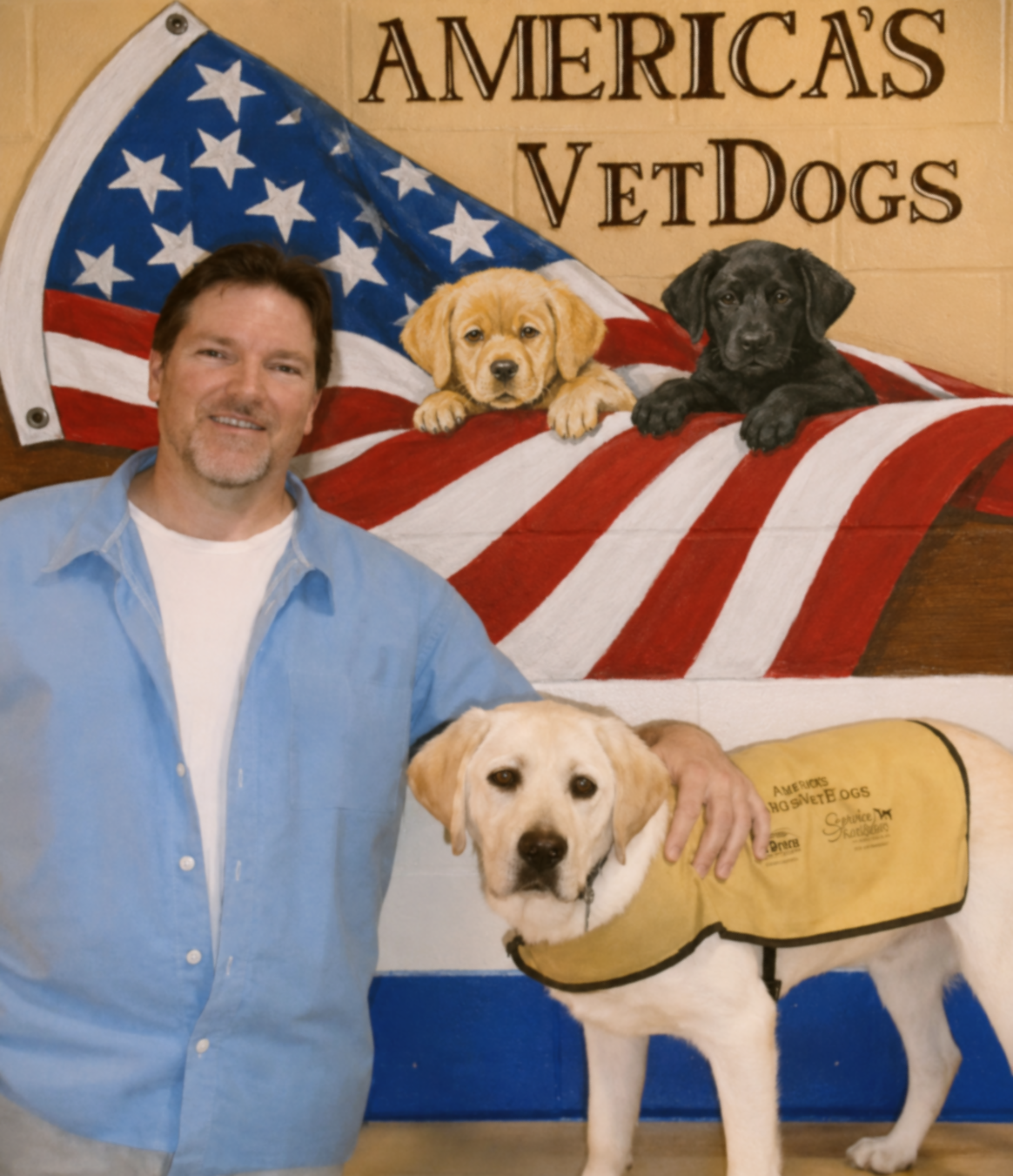
Doug Gilding with service dog trainee "Captain"

While in prison, Gilding has gotten certified as a paralegal, taught GED classes for other inmates, and trained service dogs for disabled veterans.

Both Ryan Holle and Gilding were reportedly at home and asleep when the crimes occurred, yet were convicted as non-present principals under Florida's felony murder statute and sentenced to life without parole. Writing in The Criminal Law Practitioner, Lauren Ouzts noted that "opponents to the felony murder doctrine often turn to the case of Ryan Holle" when criticizing the doctrine.

=== The Ryan Holle Reform Act ===
In 2021, Gilding drafted a felony murder reform bill titled the "Ryan Holle Reform Act". He explains: "I wrote the first draft from my cell while the prison was on COVID-19 lockdown". He was inspired by a 2007 New York Times article about Holle's felony murder conviction. Holle's case gained national attention after he received a life sentence for a murder committed by his roommates while he was at home asleep under Florida's felony murder law. Holle, who had no prior criminal record, was convicted and sentenced to life without parole for a crime committed while he was sleeping. In 2015, Florida Governor Rick Scott commuted Holle's sentence to 25 years in prison, limiting Holle's sentence to be proportional to his peripheral role in the crime. Using this reasoning as a legal foundation, Gilding modeled his proposed legislation to cap maximum sentences for all individuals who did not personally commit or intend for a death to occur. The American Bar Association published an article about the "Ryan Holle Reform Act" in their February/March 2022 issue of the American Bar Association Journal magazine.

In 2024 Dateline NBC producer Dan Slepian introduced Gilding's case to Georgetown University professor Marc Morjé Howard. In 2025, Professor Howard selected Gilding's case for Georgetown's "Making an Exoneree" program. The MAE team assigned to Gilding's case began researching records and interviewing people connected to Gilding; then created a short documentary advocating for a review of his life-without-parole sentence.

== See also ==
- Felony murder rule (Florida)
- Ryan Holle - Criminal defendant whose case involved a controversial interpretation of the felony murder rule; sentence commuted by Florida's governor.
- Janet Danahey - Criminal defendant controversially convicted of mass murder and faced the death penalty; sentence commuted by North Carolina’s governor.
