= Marion Correctional Institution (Florida) =

State prison for men in Marion County, Florida, US

Coordinates: 29°18′24″N 82°10′35″W

- Aerial view of MARCI
- Interactive map of Marion Correctional Institution
- Location: 3269 NW 105th Street Ocala, Florida
- Status: Operational
- Security class: Minimum, medium, and close
- Capacity: 1,789 = 1,509 (main) + 280 (satellite)
- Population: 1,498 = 1,229 (main) + 269 (satellite) (December 2025)
- Opened: 1976
- Managed by: Florida Department of Corrections
- Warden: Paul Kish

Marion Correctional Institution (MARCI) is a state prison for men in unincorporated Marion County, Florida, near Ocala. It is owned and operated by the Florida Department of Corrections. The facility houses a maximum of 1,789 inmates at a mix of security levels between the main unit and work camp. It stands near to Florida's Florida Women's Reception Center and Lowell Correctional Institution, both women's facilities.

== History ==
In early 1989, two escaped convicts, Patrick Paige and Anthony Cokley, were apprehended in Utah after escaping from MARCI. They held 16-year-old Ted Siegel captive for 11 days, using him as a getaway driver for a criminal spree across the United States. Siegel returned to Florida unharmed.

In 2020, inmate Jose Enriquez was sentenced to 30 years in prison for the second-degree murder of Omar Billups, which occurred while both were in July 2017. Enriquez pleaded guilty to the charge as part of a plea deal.

== Notable Inmates ==
| Inmate Name | Florida DC Number | Status | Details |
|---|---|---|---|
| William David Brown, Jr. | H34171 | Serving a life sentence without parole. | Perpetrator of the 2007 Murder of Ryan Skipper in which Brown and another man, Joseph Bearden, stabbed Skipper to death. |
| Rod Ferrell | 124473 | Serving a life sentence without parole. | "Vampire Killer" |
