= Murder of Carol and Reggie Sumner =

2005 double murder in the United States

- Location: Jacksonville, Florida (robbery and abduction); Charlton County, Georgia (murder)
- Date: July 8, 2005
- Victims: Carol and Reggie Sumner
- Perpetrators: Alan Wade; Michael J. Jackson; Tiffany Cole; Bruce Nixon
- Motive: Robbery
- Convictions: First degree murder Second degree murder Kidnapping; Robbery

On July 8, 2005, American married couple Carol and Reggie Sumner, both 61, were robbed, abducted and murdered by four acquaintances: Alan Wade (18), Michael Jackson (23), Tiffany Cole (23), and Bruce Nixon (18). After being taken from their home in Duval County, Florida, to Charlton County, Georgia, the Sumners were buried alive by Wade and Jackson in a pre-dug grave.

The perpetrators were arrested and charged with murder, kidnapping, and robbery. In 2008, Wade, Jackson, and Cole were sentenced to death for first-degree murder while Nixon was sentenced to 45 years imprisonment for second-degree murder. Cole, aged 26 at conviction, was the third youngest woman on death row in the United States.

In 2022, the death sentence of Alan Wade was reversed and changed to life imprisonment. In 2023, the sentence of Tiffany Cole was also reduced to life imprisonment. In 2024, Michael Jackson was resentenced to death.

== Background ==
Carol Alford Sumner was born on February 19, 1944. From her first marriage, she had a daughter, Rhonda Alford. Following her divorce, Carol remarried and experienced domestic violence from her second husband, with whom she had a son, Frederick Hallock. In February 1987, she survived a murder-suicide attempt, during which her husband shot her several times before killing himself. Throughout her life, Carol worked as a civil servant at The Citadel and the Charleston Air Force Base, a store worker for Belk, and a call center worker for Comcast Cable, as well as a registered nurse, paralegal, and private investigator.

James Reginald "Reggie" Sumner was born on September 18, 1943. He had been Carol's boyfriend while attending Garrett High School together, reconnecting with her in 2000 after she recognized his voice during a call while working for Comcast. The pair married the following year in West Ashley, part of Charleston, South Carolina. Before retiring, Reggie worked for CSX Railroad.

Both Sumners had diabetes and osteoporosis. In addition, Carol had arthritis, fibromyalgia, and hepatitis C-induced liver cancer, the latter through a contaminated blood transfusion, also requiring the use of a surgical boot. In March 2005, the couple decided to settle down in Jacksonville, Florida, where Reggie owned a house.

=== Planning of the crime ===
According to prosecutors, the murder was planned primarily by Michael James Jackson. Jackson and his girlfriend, Tiffany Ann Cole, were in Florida on a road trip to visit one of Jackson's friends, Alan Lyndell Wade. While there, Jackson and Cole were allowed to stay at the Sumner home in Jacksonville, as Reggie Sumner was already acquainted with Cole, who was formerly a neighbor while he lived in South Carolina. During their stay, Jackson decided that the Sumners would be easy robbery victims, having become aware of their poor health after seeing them take several prescription medications each day. Cole further informed Jackson that the Sumners had recently sold their South Carolina home for US$90,000 (equivalent to $148,364 in 2025) and that the couple owned several television sets. Cole and Jackson then made concrete plans to rob and murder the Sumners, with Jackson recruiting Wade into the plot. On June 14, in preparation for the murders, Cole rented a Mazda RX-8 in South Carolina. Two weeks before the murders, Wade told his childhood friend, Bruce Kent Nixon Jr., of Jackson's plans and agreed to involve him. While Jackson, Cole, and Wade bought gloves, duct tape, plastic wrap, Nextel phones, and a toy gun, Nixon stole four shovels from neighbors, which were then used by Nixon, Jackson, and Wade to dig a hole, measuring 6 feet (1.8 m) long and 4 feet (1.2 m) deep, in Charlton County, Georgia, 4 miles (6.4 km) from the border with Florida. The group then spied on the Sumners for several days. Jackson initially told the others that they would kill the couple through an overdose of medication after breaking into their house before deciding that they would abduct them and kill them elsewhere.

== Crime ==
On the evening of July 8, 2005, Jackson, Cole, Wade and Nixon, drove to the Sumners' home. Initially wanting to avoid being recognized, Jackson and Cole waited outside while Wade and Nixon approached the Sumners' door and asked to use their phone. Upon being granted entry, Nixon threatened the couple with a fake gun, while Wade, carrying duct tape, bound, gagged, and blindfolded the Sumners. Wade and Nixon then searched for personal financial documents in the Sumners' home before calling Jackson for assistance in finding ATM information. Jackson was unable to locate the couple's personal identification numbers. While searching the Sumners' home, Wade, Nixon, and Jackson stole Reggie's coin collection, mail, and bank records, as well as several items of jewelry.

The Sumners, still bound and gagged, were then taken outside and locked into the trunk of their own Lincoln Town Car. Wade and Nixon drove the Lincoln to Georgia, while Cole and Jackson followed in a Mazda vehicle, until they reached a remote part of Georgia near which they had prepared a pre-dug grave for the Sumners. Wade and Nixon drove the Lincoln to the grave site, and Jackson accompanied them, while Cole remained by the road in the Mazda. After driving the Lincoln to the grave site, investigators believe the Sumners told Jackson their PIN codes, which he recorded on a yellow notepad, after which they were placed into the grave, still alive. Investigators believe that while Nixon returned to the Mazda with Cole, Wade and Jackson remained at the grave and filled it with dirt, after which they drove away, leaving Carol and Reggie Sumner buried alive; a medical examiner found that the couple suffocated to death.

After driving back to Florida, the group wiped down the Sumners' car, which contained the shovels, leaving on a road near Sanderson, around 20 miles (32 km) from the grave site. Upon arrival in Jacksonville, Jackson withdrew more than $1,000 in cash from the Sumners' bank account by using their ATM card. The group rented a room at a local motel, where Jackson distributed the money. Wade and Cole later returned to the Sumner home to steal a personal computer, which they then pawned. Cole also pawned jewelry and other items stolen from the home. Nixon split from the others during the night and returned to his home in Baker County, Florida. On July 9, Nixon attended a party, where he told those present that he murdered a couple by burying them alive, showing off a bag of their prescription pills as proof.

Carol Sumner was reported missing by her daughter on July 10. The Jacksonville Sheriff's Office discovered the break-in during a welfare check and separately found their stolen car. An investigation was launched, which later found that between July 9 and July 13, 2005, an additional $5,000 had been taken from the Sumners' bank account. Surveillance footage identified Jackson and the Mazda car. At one point, Jackson exhausted the daily withdrawal limit and called the bank pretending to be Reggie Sumner. Over the phone, Jackson agreed to talk with the Jacksonville Sheriff's Office, still impersonating Reggie Sumner and claiming that the Sumners had abruptly left for Delaware to attend a funeral. Cole also pretended to be Carol Sumner when the officer on the phone asked for her. Afterwards, the detective involved traced the cell phone used by the caller through the United States Marshals Service, which showed that the same phone was used near the Sumner home during their disappearance. The Mazda was also identified to have been near the home and further confirmed through GPS data. South Carolina police were able to identify Cole and found that she had rented two motel rooms in Charleston. On July 14, Cole, Jackson, and Wade were arrested at the motel. In the room used by Jackson and Cole, the motel safe contained identification papers, credit cards, a checkbook, and other documents belonging to the Sumners, alongside mail and other material in their name in other parts of the room. The keyring of the Sumners was found in Wade's room while their coin collection was inside the trunk of Cole's car.

During interrogation at a police station, officers found the Sumners' bank card thrown into a trash can by Jackson. He claimed that the card belonged to Wade's mother, but admitted to involvement and knowledge of their grave site, though implicating Wade and Nixon as the sole perpetrators in both the kidnapping and murder. Nixon was arrested in Florida and on July 16, he led police to the location of the Sumners' bodies. Shell casings, cigarette packs, and beer cans were recovered from the scene. A forensic analysis of both cars used in the murders found that they contained sand from the grave site.

== Conviction ==
At Cole's week-long trial in October 2007, the jury deliberated for less than 90 minutes before finding her guilty of first-degree murder. They voted 9-3 for her to receive the death penalty. Evidence included photos of Cole and two co-defendants in a limousine, celebrating with champagne and hands full of cash.

Five months later, a judge handed down two death sentences for the murders, and a sentence of life in prison for the kidnappings. Cole awaited execution at Lowell Correctional Institution Annex.

Cole was one of three women on Florida's death row, the others being Margaret Allen and Tina Brown, each sentenced to death in unrelated murders. Of the previous 14 women ever sentenced to death in Florida since the 1976 Gregg v. Georgia ruling, two were executed (Judy Buenoano in 1998, and Aileen Wuornos in 2002).

Wade and Jackson also received death sentences. Nixon, who had led police to the bodies and testified against the others, pleaded guilty to second-degree murder and was sentenced to 55 years in prison.

In 2017, the Florida Supreme Court ordered new sentencing hearings for Cole, Wade, and Jackson because their juries had not unanimously recommended the death penalty. A 2016 U.S Supreme Court ruling, Hurst v. Florida, found that Florida's prior law permitting non-unanimous jury verdicts in death penalty cases violated the Sixth Amendment to the U.S. Constitution, prompting Florida to resentence more than 150 convicted felons under death sentences. In June 2022, Wade was resentenced to life in prison. In August 2023, Jackson was resentenced to death. Cole was resentenced to life imprisonment on August 23, 2023, after the jury voted 10-2 in a three-hour deliberation to spare her life.

== Documentaries ==
Due to the brutality and notoriety of the case and the fact that one of the perpetrators was a young woman later sentenced to death, the case has been the subject of several TV documentaries, including the third episode of the second season of Your Worst Nightmare, an hour-long interview of Tiffany Cole and Emilia Carr with Diane Sawyer for 20/20 in 2015, and an episode of Wicked Attraction, "Good Deeds Punished", in 2010.

This story is also recognized on Deadly Women's second episode of the fifth season, "Loathe Thy Neighbor", and the subject of a 2024 episode of the podcast Sword and Scale.

== See also ==
- Capital punishment in Florida
- List of death row inmates in the United States
- List of kidnappings (2000–2009)
- List of solved missing person cases (post-2000)
- Murders of Thomas and Jackie Hawks
