= United States v. Gementera =

- Court: United States Court of Appeals for the Ninth Circuit
- Full case name: United States v. Gementera
- Argued: May 11, 2004
- Decided: August 9, 2004
- Citation: 379 F.3d 596

Court membership
- Judges sitting: Diarmuid O'Scannlain, Eugene E. Siler, Jr. (6th Cir.), Michael Daly Hawkins

Case opinions
- Majority: O'Scannlain, joined by Siler
- Dissent: Hawkins

Laws applied
- Sentencing Reform Act; U.S. Const. amend. VIII

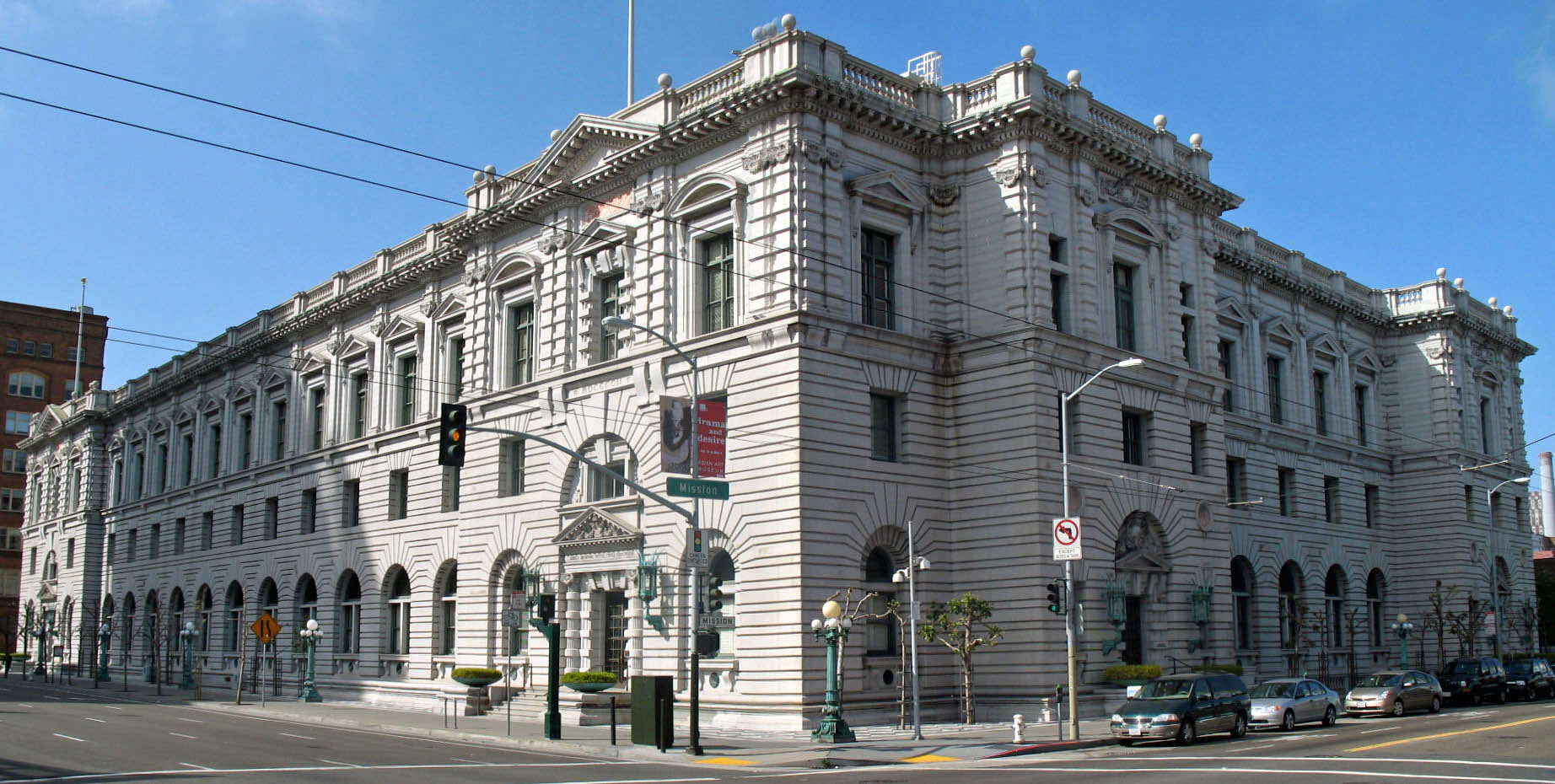
The U.S. Post Office and Courthouse at the corner of 7th and Mission Street in San Francisco.

United States v. Gementera, 379 F.3d 596 (9th Cir. 2004), was a case decided by the 9th Circuit that held that a judge had the statutory authority to impose a sentence for mail theft that involved public reintegrative shaming because the punishment was reasonably related to the statutory objective of rehabilitation. The punishment required that the thief wear a sandwich board sign stating, "I stole mail; this is my punishment", while standing for eight hours outside of a San Francisco postal facility.
