= Ryan Holle =

American convicted under the felony murder rule for lending a car to a friend

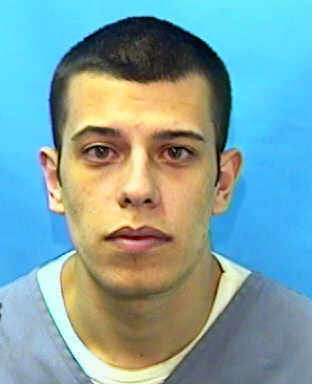
- Born: November 17, 1982 (age 43); Pensacola, Florida, U.S.
- Status: Released
- Convictions: First degree murder Armed robbery Armed burglary
- Penalty: Life imprisonment without parole, later commuted to 25 years

Ryan Joseph Holle (born November 17, 1982) is an American man convicted in 2004 of first-degree murder under the felony murder rule, after lending his car to a friend who, along with others, committed a robbery during which a woman was killed in Pensacola, Florida. His original life sentence was commuted to 25 years by Governor Rick Scott, and he served the reduced term at the Marion Correctional Facility.

== Incident ==
In the early morning hours of March 10, 2003, after a night of partying, Holle lent his car to his friend and housemate William Allen Jr. Allen drove three men to the home of Christine Snyder, where they took a safe containing approximately 1 pound (454 g) of marijuana and $425. During the burglary, one of the men, Charles Miller Jr., used a shotgun found in the house to strike and kill Jessica Snyder. Holle was about 1.5 miles (2.4 km) away at the time.

== Convictions ==
Prosecutors sought the death penalty for Charles Miller, Jr., who confessed to the killing; but he was sentenced to life without parole on May 12, 2005. The two men who entered the Snyders' home with him each received the same sentence, as did the driver, William Allen, Jr.

Christine Snyder was sentenced to three years in prison for marijuana possession.

== Trial and conviction ==
On August 3, 2004, Holle was convicted of first-degree murder under the felony murder rule, after giving police statements that indicated he knew about the planned burglary. The doctrine makes participants in certain felonies legally responsible for killings committed by their accomplices. During the trial, prosecutor David Rimmer argued, "No car, no murder." The victim's father, Terry Snyder, stated, "It never would have happened unless Ryan Holle had lent the car."

=== Statements in defense ===
In a pretrial deposition, William Allen Jr. said that Holle only told the group, "Use the car," and that "nobody really knew that girl was going to get killed." Holle had no prior criminal record and had lent his car to Allen on earlier occasions. In a 2007 interview with The New York Times, Holle said he thought the others were joking and that he believed they were going to get food. He described himself as naive and said he had been drinking all night, so he "didn't understand what was going on."

== Trial ==
Holle was the only involved person to be offered a plea bargain that might have led to a sentence of only 10 years, but he refused the deal. Holle's trial lasted one day, including testimony, jury deliberations, conviction, and sentencing.

== Commutation ==
On June 24, 2015, Governor Rick Scott commuted Holle's sentence from life imprisonment to 25 years in prison and 10 years of probation. In explaining the decision, Scott stated:

"I believe that the purpose of commutations is to undo such obviously inequitable results. Because Ryan Holle's responsibility for [the victim's] death is clearly less than [his co-defendants], I believe his sentence should likewise be less."

This was the first commutation for a felony murder conviction in Florida. Holle was released on June 30, 2024.

== The Ryan Holle Reform Act ==
Since his release from prison, Holle has partnered with another inmate, Doug Gilding, who wrote a felony murder reform bill entitled the Ryan Holle Reform Act from his prison cell. Gilding’s case involved circumstances similar to Holle’s, in which he was at home asleep when the crime occurred and was sentenced to life without parole under Florida’s felony murder rule. Upon reading about Holle's commutation, Gilding, who has been in prison for almost 30 years now, was inspired to write a reform bill, from his prison cell, that would change Florida's felony murder law by capping the amount of time in prison for individuals who were not the actual killer or a major participant in the crime.

So far, the bill has received limited support. However, with Holle now released from prison, advocates hope that he will be able to engage legislators on the issue of Florida’s felony murder law, which currently allows individuals who did not kill anyone or were not present during the crime to receive life sentences.

== See also ==
- Felony murder rule (Florida)

Other people controversially convicted of murder from the Felony murder rule.

- 1997 - Doug Gilding - Criminal defendant whose case involved a controversial interpretation of the felony murder rule.
- 2002 - Janet Danahey - Criminal defendant controversially convicted of mass murder.
