= Murder in Florida law =

Murder in Florida law constitutes the intentional killing, under circumstances defined by law, of people within or under the jurisdiction of the U.S. state of Florida.

The United States Centers for Disease Control and Prevention reported that in the year 2020, the state had a murder rate slightly above the median for the entire country.

== Definitions ==
=== First-degree murder ===
In Florida, a person is guilty of first-degree murder when it is perpetrated from a premeditated design to result in the death of a human being. A person is also guilty of first-degree murder if they cause the death of any individual during the commission of a predicate felony regardless of actual intent or premeditation, called felony murder. This offense is categorized as capital offense, so if convicted, the offender could possibly receive the death penalty.

==== Felony murder rule ====
In the state of Florida, the common law felony murder rule has been codified in Florida Statutes § 782.04. Under this statute, a person can be held liable for a murder committed by a co-defendant, even if the person was not present when it occurred or if the death was accidental. As a result, someone who played a relatively minor role in the crime could still face life imprisonment.

The predicate felonies that will support a charge of first degree murder under the statute are:

- Drug trafficking
- Arson
- Sexual battery
- Robbery or home invasion robbery
- Burglary
- Kidnapping
- Escape
- Aggravated abuse of a child, elderly person, or disabled adult
- Aircraft piracy
- Unlawful throwing, placing, or discharging of a destructive device or bomb
- Carjacking
- Aggravated stalking
- Resisting an officer with violence to his or her person
- Felonious acts of terrorism or in furtherance of an act of terrorism
- Distribution of some controlled substances like cocaine and opium

=== Second-degree murder ===
Second-degree murder is defined as either the killing of another human being during the commission of a second-degree felony, or through an act that is imminently dangerous to human life demonstrating a depraved mind. Also, if the defendant was involved in the commission of a predicate felony, but the homicide was perpetrated by another co-felon, the defendant can be charged with second degree murder.

=== Third-degree murder ===
Third-degree murder is defined as the unintentional killing of a human being during the commission or attempted commission of a non-violent felony.

=== Attempted felony murder ===
Florida also recognizes the offense of attempted felony murder, codified in F.S. § 782.051. The offense punishes those that act in a way that can kill another person during the commission of one of the predicate felonies.

== Penalties ==
Offense	Mandatory sentencing
Manslaughter	Maximum of 15 years in prison/probation if a firearm is not used; Maximum of 30 years in prison/probation if a firearm is used
Third-degree murder	10 1/3 to 15 years in prison/probation
Aggravated manslaughter of a child	Maximum of 30 years in prison/probation if a firearm is not used; Maximum of life if a firearm is used
Second-degree murder	Minimum of 16 3/4 years in prison if a firearm is not used; Minimum of 25 years in prison if a firearm is used; For adults: Maximum of life For juveniles: Maximum of life-with-parole after 15 or 25 years
First-degree murder	For adults: Death by electric chair or lethal injection or life For juveniles: Minimum of 40 years in prison; Maximum of life-with-parole after 15 or 25 years if the juvenile was not convicted of any earlier violent crimes; Maximum of life-without-parole if the juvenile had been convicted of any earlier violent crimes and the murder was intentional

If a person participates in or is an accomplice to a predicate felony, and they or a co-defendant contributed to the death of the victim, then the person will be charged with murder in the first degree - felony murder which is a capital felony. The only two sentences available for that statute are life-without-parole and the death penalty.

If a person commits a predicate felony, but the death of the victim was caused by someone other than a co-defendant then the person will be charged with murder in the second degree - felony murder which is a felony of the first degree. The maximum prison term is life-without-parole, and the minimum term is 10 years.

For juvenile offenders tried as adults, the standard maximum sentence for first- and second-degree murder is life with the possibility of parole after 15 years if the death was unintentional, and 25 years if the death was intentional. An exception to this rule applies to first-degree murders where the death was intentional, and the juvenile offender has a prior conviction for a violent crime; in such cases, the juvenile can be sentenced to life without the possibility of parole. The minimum sentence for first-degree murder for juveniles is 40 years.

== Criticism ==
Some critics of the felony murder rule argue that the rule is unjust because it does not require intent to kill. In the United States, for example, twenty-year-old Florida resident Ryan Holle was convicted of first-degree murder for lending his car to a friend after his friend told him that he intended to go rob a drug dealer. The friend took the car, and during the robbery ended up beating an 18-year-old girl to death; while Holle was home in bed asleep. Holle has since had his sentence commuted by the governor and has been released; however, the similarly situated Doug Gilding remains in prison. Gilding was 24 years old when he was a passenger in a car during a 10-minute conversation about a robbery back in 1997. He then went home, and, like Holle, was asleep in bed when the actual robbery occurred; where the perpetrators shot and killed an employee at a bar. Gilding refused a 4-year plea deal, then lost at trial where he was convicted under Florida's felony murder rule and received a life-without-parole sentence; and has been in prison for the last three decades. Since his release from prison, Holle has partnered with Gilding, who wrote a felony murder reform bill entitled the "Ryan Holle Reform Act" from his prison cell. Gilding was inspired by Holle's case to write the reform bill, which would change Florida's felony murder law by capping the amount of time in prison for individuals who were not the actual killer or a major participant in the crime. So far, the bill has received limited support. However, with Holle now released from prison, advocates hope that he will be able to engage legislators on the issue of Florida’s felony murder law, which currently allows individuals who did not kill anyone or were not present during the crime to receive life sentences.

== See also ==
- Ryan Holle - Criminal defendant whose case involved a controversial interpretation of the felony murder rule; sentence commuted by Florida's governor.
- Doug Gilding - Criminal defendant whose case involved a controversial interpretation of the felony murder rule; incarcerated since 1997.
- Jennifer Mee
- Law of Florida
