= Janet Danahey =

American arsonist

- Dahaney’s mugshot
- Born: August 31, 1978 (age 48); Greenville, Pennsylvania
- Education: University of North Carolina at Greensboro
- Known for: Committing the Campus Walk Apartment fire
- Status: Imprisoned
- Motive: Revenge on a former romantic partner

Details
- Victims: 10
- Date: February 15, 2002; 2:00 - 2:30 A:M
- State: North Carolina
- Location: Greensboro
- Target: Thad Johnson
- Killed: 4
- Injured: 6
- Weapons: Lighter fluid and matches
- Date apprehended: February 17, 2002

Janet Louise Danahey (born August 31, 1978) is an American mass murderer who perpetrated the Campus Walk Apartment fire in Greensboro, North Carolina, United States.

On the night of February 15, 2002, she set fire to a futon outside the apartment of her ex-boyfriend. Dahaney characterized the fire as a prank in retaliation for him ending the relationship. The fire spread to the main apartment building, causing students to jump from their windows to escape the flames. Firefighters discovered four bodies, and additional students were injured.

Danahey faced a possible death penalty under North Carolina’s felony murder rule, which can lead to murder charges for deaths resulting from some felonies even if there was no homicidal intent. However she took a plea deal, and was convicted and sentenced to life in prison without the possibility of parole. Her conviction was controversial, with some observers believing the sentence too severe and others seeing it as appropriate and criticizing her supporters as not grasping the gravity of her crime. Her sentence was commuted in 2022, making her eligible for parole in 2029. It was then commuted further, making her eligible in 2023.

The fire was the deadliest in Greensboro’s history until a 2018 fire killed five children.

== Background ==
Janet Danahey was born on August 31, 1978, to Mary Belle and Dave Danahey in Greenville, Pennsylvania. The family moved to Lafayette, Louisiana, before moving to Kernersville, North Carolina. In 1996, she was selected as an Olympic torchbearer. The same year, she was arrested for vandalism to personal property on Christmas Eve. Danahey paid a fine and later the conviction was dismissed. She earned a business administration degree at the University of North Carolina and worked as a gofer. She had also worked at Syngenta Crop protection doing inventory.

== Campus Walk Apartment fire ==
On Valentine’s Day 2002, Danahey invited two of her friends over for dinner. They decided to play a prank on Thad Johnston, Danahey’s ex-boyfriend who had recently dumped her. The trio bought clam juice to pour on his car’s radiator, and drove to the Campus Walk Apartments, a student apartment complex housing 36 residents, but they were unable to find the vehicle and changed plans. Instead, Danahey focused on a box of Christmas decorations left on Johnson's porch. She took lighter fluid and set out to burn the decorations as her roommates returned to their apartment. Around 2:00 A:M, she poured the lighter fluid on the box and lit it only for the tinsel to melt. Danahey turned her attention to an old futon on the porch and lit it on fire. She then left the scene.

The fire spread quickly throughout the structure, destroying the wooden stairway and removing the only method of escape. Four people died in the fire and six others were injured. Many residents were still asleep during the fire and suffered burns to their feet trying to escape, while many jumped out of windows to escape.

The victims were from Apartment K, who had tried to make a run from the flames. They were: sisters Donna and Rachel Llewellyn, their roommate, Elizabeth Harris, and Donna’s boyfriend Ryan Bek. Harris fell several stories to her death, as she opened a door to a walkway that was no longer there and fell on a concrete slab, while Bek and the Llewellyn sisters burned to death as they ran down a hallway that collapsed. The four’s remains would be found in the first floor breezeway.

After setting the fire, Danahey took off her clothes and walked back to her apartment and asked her friends to take her to a dumpster where she disposed of the evidence. Danahey was later apprehended at her parents home and arrested and charged with murder on February 17. Her friends reported her to police after seeing on television that the four victims had perished in the fire.

== Legal proceedings ==
Danahey was initially only charged with the murder of Rachel Llewellyn, as the other three victims had yet to be identified. Danahey was later indicted on four counts of first degree-murder and one count of arson, and held without bond as she awaited trial. Prosecutors were pursuing the death penalty. The prosecutors seeking it, shocked many, including the Judge and Danahey.

To avoid the death penalty, she pleaded guilty to the four counts of first degree murder and was sentenced to life imprisonment without the possibility of parole. During her sentencing in July she apologized profusely to the courtroom and gave what was described as a bizarre speech: “The angels of your children have come to me, and I have touched their hands, and they have told me what it felt like to feel their flesh burn. I know who they are. They are a part of me now. You are my family now. You are stuck with me now. I hurt you, and I will make that better.”

== Aftermath ==
The fire changed building codes in Greensboro with measures put in place to avoid another potential loss of life.

Danahey’s conviction under the felony murder rule was widely controversial, leading some to petition a change to the rule and reduce Danahey’s sentence, as well as petition legislators seeking to end the death penalty in the felony murder rule. The district attorney opposed the suggested reduction of her sentence, saying “It was no different than taking a gun and shooting it into an apartment building”. They also alleged that Danahey’s defenders were downplaying the crime and how it was tasteless to say the victims died because of a prank. In 2005, a new apartment building was built in the same place where the original one stood.

College funds were founded and named after the Llewellyn sisters, with a scholarship fund named after Donna at Greensboro College, and a nursing scholarship named after Rachel for UNCG.

== Danahey’s commutation ==
In the years following the fire, Danahey petitioned for clemency. She petitioned for clemency from then North Carolina governor Bev Purdue, but it was denied. On December 30, 2017, she resubmitted her petition to governor Pat McCrory, who commuted her sentence, making her parole eligible on January 1, 2029. Governor Roy Cooper later commuted her sentence again, making her eligible for parole on January 1, 2023. This made her one of the only cases where two different governors from different political parties commuted the sentence of a single prisoner. She was denied parole later the same year.

== See also ==
- Happy Land fire - another act of arson targeting a former romantic partner
- 2009 Kuwait wedding fire - an act of arson targeting a loved one as an act of revenge
- Pleasant Garden shooting - act of mass murder in Guilford County committed by a jilted lover
- Ryan Holle - another individual controversially convicted under the felony murder rule
