= Dan Markel =

American law professor and murder victim (1972–2014)

- Born: October 9, 1972; Montreal, Quebec, Canada
- Died: July 19, 2014 (aged 41); Tallahassee, Florida, U.S.
- Cause of death: Gunshot wound
- Education: Harvard University (BA, JD); Emmanuel College, Cambridge (MPhil)
- Occupations: Law professor; author
- Spouse: Wendi Jill Adelson (m. 2006; div. 2013)
- Children: 2

Daniel Eric Markel (October 9, 1972 – July 19, 2014) was a Canadian-born attorney and law professor who wrote various works on retribution in criminal law and sentencing with a focus on the role of punishment in the criminal justice system. He earned a J.D. degree from Harvard University in 2001, and after working as a law clerk to a federal judge and as an associate at a law firm, joined the faculty of Florida State University in 2005.

In 2014, Markel was killed in Tallahassee, Florida, in a murder-for-hire motivated by child custody issues following Markel's divorce from Wendi Adelson, a clinical law professor and child advocate also employed at Florida State University at the time.

As of September 2025, five individuals have been convicted in the case. Donna Adelson—Wendi Adelson's mother and Markel's former mother-in-law—was convicted of first-degree murder, conspiracy to commit murder, and solicitation of murder in September 2025. Charlie Adelson—Donna Adelson's son and Wendi Adelson's brother, as well as Markel's former brother-in-law—was convicted of first-degree murder, conspiracy to commit murder, and solicitation of murder, and sentenced to life in prison plus an additional 30 years each for the conspiracy and solicitation convictions. Sigfredo Garcia was found guilty of first-degree murder and conspiracy to commit murder, and sentenced to life in prison. After a mistrial in her original trial, Katherine Magbanua was found guilty of first-degree murder, conspiracy to commit murder, and solicitation of murder in a retrial and sentenced to life in prison plus two consecutive 30-year sentences. Luis Rivera pled guilty to second-degree murder, and was sentenced to 19 years in prison. Neither Markel's ex-wife Wendi Adelson nor Wendi Adelson's father (and Markel's former father-in-law) Harvey Adelson have been charged, but prosecutors have named both as "unindicted co-conspirator" in the killing.

== Early life and education ==
Daniel Eric Markel was born in Montreal and raised in Toronto in a religious Jewish family. He studied politics and philosophy as a Harvard undergraduate, graduating magna cum laude. While on a Dorot Fellowship in Israel, Markel completed graduate studies at the Hebrew University of Jerusalem and earned a master's degree in political theory from Emmanuel College, Cambridge, before receiving his J.D. from Harvard Law School in 2001.

== Legal career ==
Before entering teaching, Markel served as law clerk to Judge Michael Daly Hawkins of the United States Court of Appeals for the Ninth Circuit and was an associate with the law firm Kellogg, Huber, Hansen, Todd, Evans & Figel in Washington, D.C., practicing white-collar criminal defense. His work at the firm included representing a group of law professors in an amicus brief arguing against shaming as punishment in a criminal case before the Ninth Circuit.

Markel joined the faculty of the Florida State University College of Law in 2005; he was tenured in 2010. Markel held the post of D'Alemberte Professor of Law at the FSU College of Law.

== Work ==
Markel co-authored a book exploring the intersection between crime, punishment and family, Privilege or Punish: Criminal Justice and the Challenge of Family Ties (2009).

Markel was a co-founder of a blog for law professors, PrawfsBlawg. His law review articles included an argument for the abolition of the death penalty published in the Harvard Civil Rights-Civil Liberties Law Review, a critique of the use of shaming as punishment published in the Vanderbilt Law Review, and a paper on punitive damages published in the University of Pennsylvania Law Review.

Also interested in sports law, he and his co-authors proposed a method of giving fans an opportunity to participate in the management of sports teams. He also wrote opinion pieces for The New York Times, Slate, and the Atlantic, among other publications.

In addition to his scholarship, he was a consultant for the defense in a federal prosecution in New Jersey involving rabbis accused of extortion by the FBI.

== Murder ==
Markel was shot at his home in Tallahassee, Florida, shortly before 11 a.m. on July 18, 2014, and died early the next day. The Tallahassee Police Department announced that Markel was the "intended victim" and termed his death a murder. On August 1, 2014, the Associated Press reported that emergency medical response was delayed because a dispatcher erroneously classified the call as less serious than it was.

A highly regarded and popular professor, Markel was the subject of many tributes from the academic community. The day after his death, a memorial service was held at the synagogue he had attended, Congregation Shomrei Torah, in Tallahassee. Markel was buried in Pardes Shalom Cemetery in Maple, Ontario.

A $25,000 Crime Stoppers reward was initially offered. A separate, independently funded $100,000 award was offered in July 2015. On the one-year anniversary of the murder, the Tallahassee Police Department called a press conference and showed photographs of a silver pine mica Toyota Prius, asking the public for help in locating the vehicle. The police also released unredacted police reports from the crime scene in February 2016, but these contained no new information regarding the crime, only the names of police officers who visited the crime scene.

=== 2016 developments ===
On May 26, 2016, a suspect, Sigfredo Garcia, 34, of Miami Beach, was arrested for first-degree murder. Tallahassee police would not release further details, but told reporters that the killing was being investigated as a murder for hire. A few days later, a judge in Leon County court ordered the probable cause affidavit behind the arrest unsealed. The affidavit revealed investigators' belief that Garcia and Luis Rivera, 33, had traveled from the Miami area in a rented Toyota Prius, staying in motels the nights of July 16 and 17, 2014, to commit the crime. Evidence included a cellphone, banking and SunPass electronic toll collection records; security camera footage from buildings and city buses along the streets Markel and the alleged killers had driven, and the testimony of an unnamed informant along with a nearby witness. The morning of the killing, they had trailed Markel as he ran errands and went to the gym, until they could shoot him at his home.

The affidavit further outlined investigators' theory of the case: that Markel's death was a contract killing, in which Charlie Adelson (the brother of Markel's ex-wife Wendi Adelson) and Donna Adelson (Charlie and Wendi's mother) had used Katherine Magbanua as an intermediary to hire Sigfredo Garcia and Luis Rivera for the killing. According to the affidavit, the motive was the desire of the family of Wendi Adelson to allow her to relocate to the Miami area with the children. Katherine Magbanua, who had mothered Garcia's two children, was alleged to have been the link between the Adelson family and Garcia and Rivera. Investigators alleged that neither Rivera nor Garcia knew Markel but that Charlie Adelson was in a "personal relationship" with Katherine Magbanua, that Magbanua received a large amount of money from the Adelsons following the killing, that Magbanua was the first call Garcia dialed after Markel was murdered and that Charlie and Donna Adelson disliked Markel. The affidavit further noted that Wendi Adelson had been granted 50-50 custody when the couple's acrimonious divorce had been finalized in 2013, when Markel had won an order prohibiting her from moving to Miami with the children. In 2014, Markel filed a motion that would have prohibited his mother-in-law from being alone and unsupervised with the children due to alleged disparaging remarks about their father.

On June 17, 2016, a grand jury in Leon County indicted Garcia and Rivera on charges of first-degree murder in connection with Markel's killing. At the time, Rivera was already in jail for a conviction on federal charges of racketeering conspiracy arising from his leadership of the North Miami group of the Latin Kings gang. The state filed documentation with the court, including detailed information on Rivera and Garcia's first trip to Tallahassee on June 4–6, 2014 and an exhaustive review of cellular phone and GPS records placing them in the vicinity of Markel on both trips. The state also issued an expanded probable cause affidavit which included photographs and maps related to the murder. The media released videos of the Toyota Prius stalking Markel throughout Tallahassee on July 18, 2014. Sigfredo Garcia was pictured in a Toyota Prius at an ATM in Pembroke Pines, wearing a white long-sleeved dress shirt. Media reports using the released videos showed that immediately after the murder, video from a Tallahassee bus showed the Prius going North on Thomasville Road, with an individual in the passenger side changing into a long-sleeved white shirt.

On September 16, 2016, ABC News aired "In-Laws and Outlaws", on a 20/20 episode on the investigation into the murder.

On October 1, 2016, police arrested Katherine Magbanua; she too was charged with murder. On October 4, 2016, Luis Rivera pled guilty to the charge of murder as part of a plea bargain in which he was sentenced to 19 years in prison, which would run concurrently with another sentence he was already serving. In his confession, Rivera claimed that Sigfredo Garcia had recruited Rivera to take part in the killing of Markel and that Katherine Magbanua was "the woman in the middle doing everything". Rivera also claimed that he did not know the names of the people who had hired Garcia and Magbanua but that the reason for the killing was "because the lady wants her two kids back. She wants full custody of the kids." The Adelsons denied any involvement.

=== 2019 developments ===
The trials for Katherine Magbanua and Sigfredo Garcia were combined and took place in October 2019. In the trial, prosecutors claimed that Charlie Adelson had arranged to pay Magbanua, Rivera, and Garcia $100,000 to murder Markel so that Wendi Adelson could get full custody of Markel's and Wendi Adelson's two sons. At trial, Magbanua denied involvement but claimed that the case presented by the prosecutors led her to believe Adelson was "involved" in the murders. For his part, Garcia claimed that Rivera had carried out the killing alone. On October 11, a jury found Sigfredo Garcia guilty of first-degree murder and conspiracy in the 2014 killing of Dan Markel. On October 15, the court sentenced Garcia to life in prison without the possibility of parole for the murder charge, plus 30 years for conspiracy. The jury was unable to reach a verdict on Katherine Magbanua, with two sources with knowledge of the vote confirming it was 10–2 for conviction. Magbanua remained in jail, pending retrial.

=== 2022 developments ===
Charlie Adelson was arrested on April 21, 2022, and was charged with first-degree murder, conspiracy to commit murder, and solicitation to commit murder. Wendi's comments about a TV during her interview immediately after the murder can be reconciled with Donna's use of "TV" as a code word two years later on a wiretap.

After several delays due to the COVID-19 pandemic, Katherine Magbanua's retrial began on May 16, 2022. On May 27, 2022, a jury found Magbanua guilty of first-degree murder, conspiracy to commit murder, and solicitation to commit murder. She was sentenced to life in prison without the possibility of parole for the first-degree murder, 30 years for the conspiracy, and an additional 30 years for the solicitation.

On November 16, 2022, a request was made for Katherine Magbanua to be handed over to the Leon County Sheriff so she could be transported to the Leon County State Attorney's Office for a proffer in relation to Charlie Adelson's trial scheduled to take place on October 23, 2023. Adelson and Magbanua were dating at the time of the murder.

=== 2023 and subsequent developments ===
Charlie Adelson's trial began on Thursday, October 26, 2023, in a Leon County courtroom the day before his 47th birthday. On Monday, November 6, 2023, Adelson was convicted of first-degree murder, conspiracy to commit first-degree murder, and solicitation of first-degree murder. On Tuesday, December 12, 2023, he was sentenced to life in prison for first-degree murder plus an additional 30 years each for the conspiracy and solicitation convictions.

On the evening of November 13, 2023, Donna Adelson, Markel's former mother-in-law, was arrested at the Miami International Airport on a warrant from Leon County, apparently trying to flee on a one-way ticket to Vietnam, a country with no extradition treaty with the U.S. She was charged with first-degree murder, conspiracy to commit murder, and solicitation of murder. Her trial was set to begin September 17, 2024, but proceedings were delayed when Donna Adelson's attorney withdrew his representation of her on the first day of jury selection. The following year, her trial began on August 22, 2025 and she was convicted of all counts on September 4, 2025. On October 13, 2025, Donna Adelson was sentenced to life imprisonment.

== Markel Act ==
Following the 2016 arrests, Wendi Adelson cut off contact between Markel's parents and their grandsons. She also took the step of changing her sons' last names from Markel to Adelson, claiming it was for their safety. Florida's grandparent visitation laws are among the most restrictive in the nation, leaving the Markels with no way to even petition a court for a ruling on whether they can be granted contact with their grandsons. The Florida Legislature considered a bill in the 2020 legislative session, SB 1886 sponsored by Sen. Jeff Brandes, that would create an additional set of conditions in which grandparents would be granted standing to access courts. Wendi Adelson's attorney denounced the bill as an "absolute outrage."

In 2022, HB 1119, informally known as the Markel Act, passed both chambers of the Florida legislature and was signed into law by Governor Ron DeSantis.

== Personal life ==
Markel married Wendi Jill Adelson in February 2006. They had two sons, one born in 2009 and one in 2010. The couple separated in 2012. Their divorce became final on July 31, 2013.

== See also ==
- List of Florida State University people
- List of Harvard Law School alumni
- Over My Dead Body – True crime podcast
