= Murder of Lazaro Figueroa =

1990 child murder in Florida, United States

The "Baby Lollipops" murder was the murder in 1990 of three-year-old Lazaro Figueroa by his mother Ana Maria Cardona in Florida. The body of Lazaro was found abandoned, and identified through house-to-house inquiries. The case was widely covered in US media, who called the initially unidentified boy "Baby Lollipops", after the design on the T-shirt he was wearing when found.

Cardona was arrested for the murder and sentenced to death; her girlfriend, Olivia Gonzalez, was sentenced to forty years. On a second appeal, Cardona was sentenced to life in prison. Gonzalez was released after 14 years.

== Background ==
Ana Maria Cardona
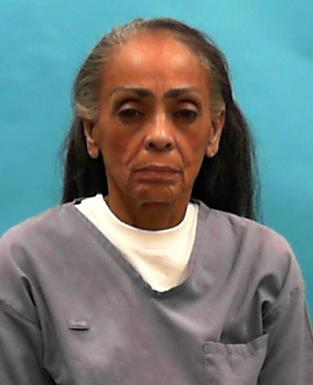
- Born: Ana Maria Cardona; November 26, 1961 (age 64); Havana, Cuba
- Conviction: Sentenced to death on April 1, 1992. Resentenced to death on June 10, 2011. Sentenced to life imprisonment on December 13, 2017.

Details
- Victims: Lazaro Figueroa
- Country: United States
- States: Miami, Florida

Lazaro Figueroa was born on September 18, 1987, to Ana Maria Cardona and Fidel Figueroa. Cardona also had two older children. Fidel Figueroa was a well-known drug dealer and died under mysterious circumstances on September 20, 1987. This crime remains unsolved.

In November 1990, Lazaro Figueroa's body was discovered in the bushes of a Miami Beach property. He had been severely battered, which made it initially very difficult for authorities to identify him. Because Lazaro's remains were unidentified for weeks after his discovery, local news outlets nicknamed him "Baby Lollipops" in reference to the shirt he was found wearing. The cause of death was later determined to be a blow to the head from a baseball bat along with starvation and severe trauma to his body. Trial evidence showed that shortly after leaving Lazaro's body in the bushes, Cardona and her lover, Olivia Gonzalez, fled to Central Florida, even making a stop at Disney World.

Map of Florida: Miami Beach

Despite claims by neighbors and other individuals that Cardona was abusive towards Lazaro, she consistently denied it. Her main defense was that it was Olivia Gonzalez who had beaten Lazaro and delivered the fatal blow with a baseball bat. Cardona attested that she wanted to escape the pain of her son's horrible beatings at her girlfriend's hands and so sank into cocaine use to cope. To support claims on the influence of her past in the case, her defense presented the court with evidence pertaining to her unsettled Cuban upbringing and the psychological devastation caused by the death of Lazaro's father. According to prosecutor Reid Rubin, however, Cardona was "angry and spiteful" from the death of her wealthy husband as she had lost a luxurious lifestyle.

Gonzalez, however, was able to state her case against Cardona in exchange for a lighter 40-year sentence on the count of second-degree murder. She served 14 years. While admitting she played a role in her girlfriend's abuse of Lazaro, she was able to lay the majority of the blame on Cardona for Lazaro's eventual death.

== Discovery ==
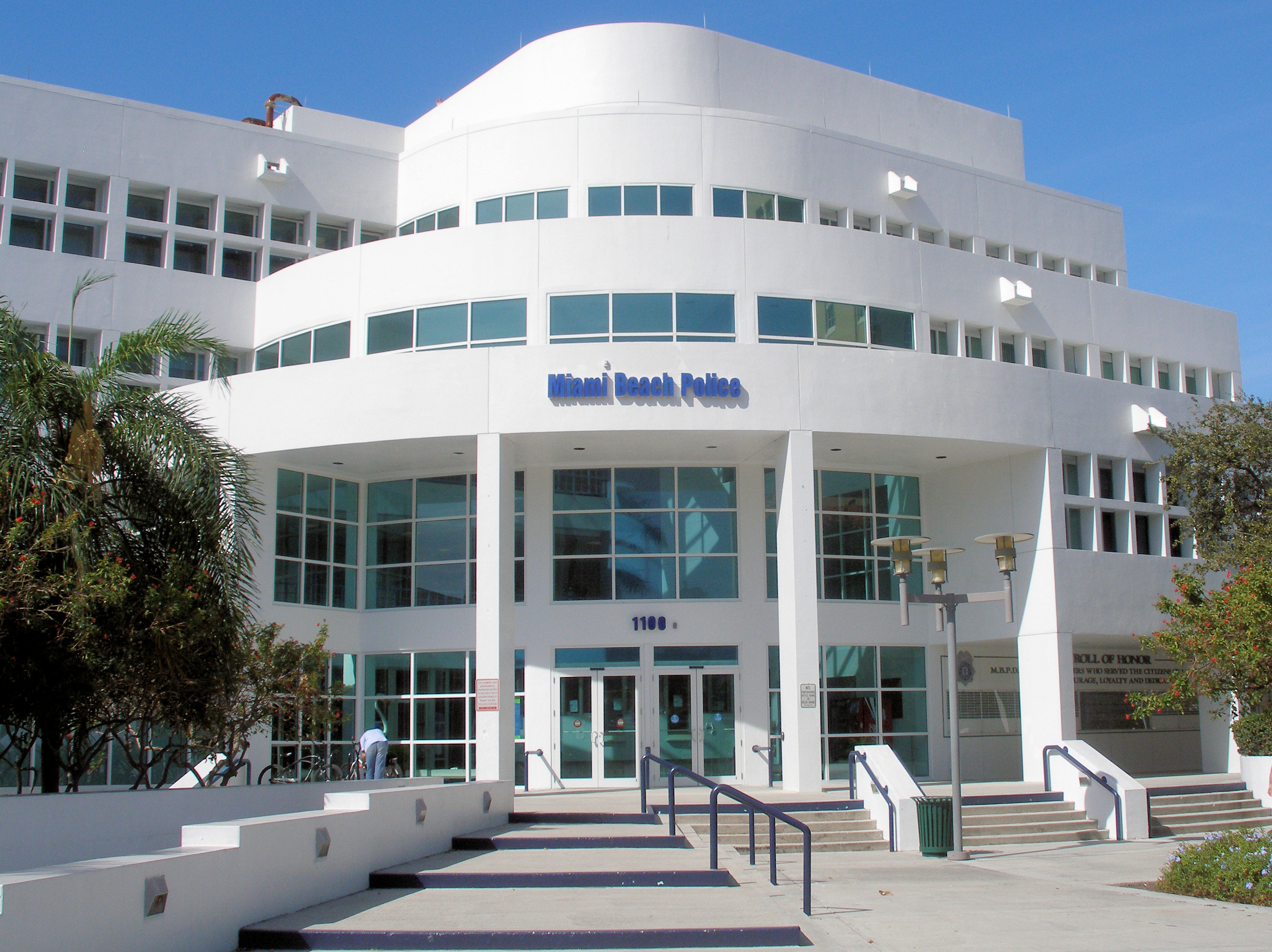
Miami Beach Police Department Headquarters

Employees for the Florida Power & Light Company discovered Lazaro Figueroa's dead body on the morning of November 2, 1990, at Miami Beach, hidden beneath some bushes. The boy was so emaciated that he appeared skeletal, with a bruised right eye. He wore blue gym shorts over a soiled diaper wrapped multiple times with brown packaging tape. At the time of his murder, Lazaro's weight was 18 pounds (8.16 kg), half the weight of a healthy child his age. The t-shirt he was wearing caused the Miami Beach Police Department to name him "Baby Lollipops," and he remained unidentified for weeks after his discovery.

The Miami Beach Police Department hosted a media conference with multiple detectives handling the murder case. They also conducted door-to-door interviews in both English and Spanish to obtain more information about the boy. They received numerous leads and were eventually able to identify the boy as Lazaro Figueroa, son of Ana Maria Cardona and the late Fidel Figueroa .

== Physical injuries and autopsy ==
The autopsy revealed that Lazaro had a fresh tear to his corpus callosum as the result of a head injury that occurred hours to days before he died. The police concluded that he died from a fractured skull, later known to be the result of a baseball bat blow. He was also starved and beaten, with a cigarette burn on his left cheek, broken teeth, broken bones, and bedsores from being bound to a mattress for extended periods. His diaper was caked with excrement and attached to his body with brown packing tape, and his arm was permanently fixed at 90 degrees.

Weighing only 18 pounds at the time of his death, Lazaro was malnourished, anaemic, and dehydrated. The majority of his body bore bruises and scars, which were the result of longstanding injuries from the months preceding his death.

Evidence presented at the trials demonstrated that Lazaro experienced 18 months of torture while he was alive. Medical data demonstrated repeated occurrences of severe abuse resulting in an arm fracture and skull fractures with underlying subdural and subarachnoid hematomas. His two upper front teeth also appeared to be knocked out.

Medical examiner Dr. Bruce Hyma testified that Lazaro's physical injuries were inflicted upon him over a long period, and that he had been subject to gagging and repeated starvation.

== Trials ==
=== First trial ===
Cardona argued at her first trial in 1992 that her girlfriend at the time, Olivia Gonzalez, was the one who tortured Lazaro, finally causing his death. Acquaintances of Ana Maria Cardona testified against her by recounting how she had consistently treated Lazaro poorly. Gonzalez, who pleaded guilty, was sentenced to 40 years and served 14 years.

Gonzalez testified that on the "last day of October" (the last day before Lazaro's death), Cardona "got pissed off and she hit [Lazaro] with a bat over the head" because he was slow in taking off his diaper. She stated that Cardona hit Lazaro until "a hole was opened up in his head". "His head was cracked." Gonzalez explained that the wound "started bleeding and bleeding and bleeding, and then I put mercury on it and I applied a plastic band."

Throughout the trial, Cardona labelled Gonzalez as a "murderer" and as a "monster" who forced her to succumb to a sexual relationship with her in exchange for food and shelter for herself and her children. Defense attorney Steven Yermish remarked, "She was in an abusive relationship she viewed as inescapable because she was being provided for."

Judge David L. Tobin described Lazaro's long-standing abuse as the most "heinous, atrocious and cruel of all times." Cardona was found guilty of first-degree murder as well as aggravated child abuse. She received a sentence of death based on the condition of her son's body, becoming the first woman to be sent to death row in Florida.

=== Second trial ===
In 2002, Cardona's initial sentence was overturned due to a Brady violation by the prosecution team, who had failed to allow defense attorneys access to interviews with Gonzalez, and the Florida Supreme Court granted her a second trial. At the second trial in 2010, prosecutors focused their attention on Lazaro's physical condition and the abuse he had suffered at the hands of his mother.

In the second trial, a mentally-disabled 14-year-old girl, Gloria Pi from Miami Beach, provided a detailed confession of throwing Lazaro against a wall. As a result, Cardona's legal defense team attempted to shift the blame of Lazaro's murder from Cardona to the girl. During the trial, Pi retracted her confession and maintained that she was innocent, emphasizing that she had never cared for or met Lazaro when the defense posited that in the days leading up to his death, Pi was looking after him. The jury requested that the confession be reread during their deliberation for the verdict. However, the jurors discounted Pi's testimony because there was not enough evidence to suggest that Lazaro ever stayed at Pi's residence. State prosecutor Kathleen Pautler described the confession as a "diversionary tactic" used by Cardona's defense team.

Miami-Dade jurors again found Cardona guilty of the two counts, and in 2011, she was sentenced to death a second time. In contrast to her outrage at the verdict in the 1992 trial, Cardona appeared collected when her sentence was handed down. State Attorney Katherine Fernandez Rundle stated, "Almost 20 years later, a second jury heard the evidence and has come to the same conclusion...The truth still remains the truth." While reading her sentence, the judge, Reemberto Diaz stated, "Ana Maria Cardona, you have forfeited your right to live... Lazaro was tortured to death."

=== Third trial ===
Cardona spent 17 years on death row before her verdict was overturned by a higher court because the prosecution had used arguments that "improperly inflamed the minds and passions of the jurors".

The prosecution in the third trial did not seek the death penalty.

In her third trial in 2017, a neighbor testified, "She closed the door...it didn't appear that any lights were on but the shower was going and he was screaming." She stated that Lazaro was "very small, very thin, very frail." However, Cardona insisted under oath that she did not inflict significant abuse on her son or break any of his bones. She also continued to recant her 1990 statement that Lazaro fell off the bed and hit his head, causing the tear in his corpus callosum. Instead, she placed the blame on her ex-girlfriend Olivia Gonzalez, insisting that she struck Lazaro with a baseball bat. The defense said they would introduce evidence Gonzalez had confessed to hitting the boy with the baseball bat and killing him.

Cardona's lawyer, Stephen Yermish, attempted to persuade the jury that while she was indeed a bad mother, she was not necessarily a murderer. He conceded that "the charge of aggravated child abuse may have been proven", but that the "charge of murder has not".

The jury found Cardona guilty of the death of Lazaro Figueroa in 1990, and the court convicted her of first-degree murder and aggravated child abuse for a third time. However, this time she was sentenced to life in prison instead of a death sentence. Presiding Judge Miguel de la O remarked, "there are wild beasts that show more empathy for their offspring than you showed Lazaro."

Cardona's elder son, a 37-year-old named Juan Puente, died while also in prison. Puente, while serving a 10-year sentence for burglary, died at Gulf Correctional Institution's Annex in February 2018. While in jail in 2010, he was brought to a Miami courtroom to testify on his mother's behalf in an effort to convince a jury to spare her life. "The case followed him around, every time he got arrested. It was like a revolving door," said Cardona's former lawyer, Edith Georgi. "The kid had a really sweet way about him. He was very easy to get to know and friendly. But he had an addiction he couldn't cure."

=== Media recognition ===
The Baby Lollipops case amassed tons of media attention, most being anti-LGBTQ+ and anti-Latin American hate towards Cardona.

In her book Ordinary Girls: A Memoir, Jaquíra Diaz reviews the impact of Cardona's status as both an immigrant and a queer woman on her trials.

== See also ==
- List of solved missing person cases: 1950–1999
