= Boardman, Florida =

- Unincorporated community
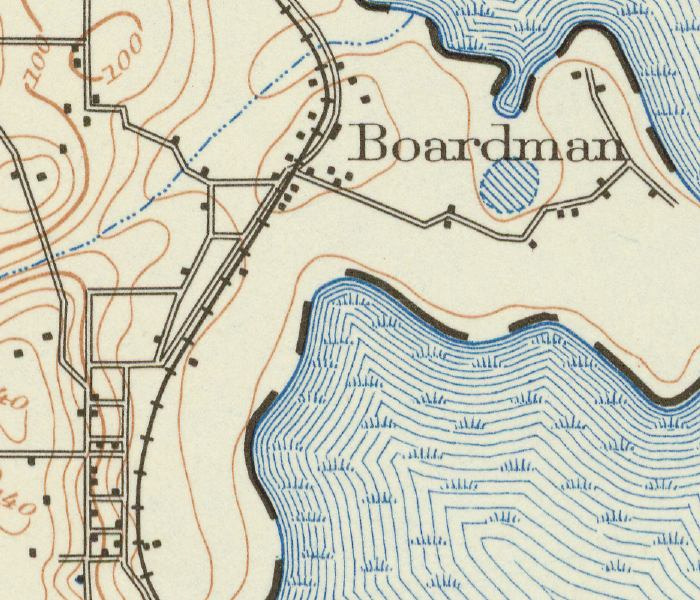
- 1938 USGS detail map of Boardman

- Location within Florida Location within the United States
- Coordinates: 29.467°N 82.214°W
- Country: United States
- State: Florida
- County: Marion
- Elevation: 69 ft (21 m)
- Time zone: UTC-5 (Eastern (EST))
  - Summer (DST): UTC-4 (EDT)
- ZIP codes: 32667
- Area code: 352

Boardman is an unincorporated community in Marion County, Florida, United States. It lies just east of U.S. Route 441 / State Road 25, along Northwest 219th Street.

== Location and demographics ==
The Boardman area can be reached via Interstate 75 to U.S. Route 441. The community lies between Evinston to the north and McIntosh to the south.

The Micanopy post office serves the local zip code of 32667. The zip code, located within the Gainesville, Florida Metropolitan Statistical Area, was populated by 1,591 men and 1,637 women in 2010. The median ages of men and women were 42.2 and 45.1, respectively. The average home value was $88,100 and the average annual household income was $54,298.
