= Radio Winchcombe =

English community radio station serving Winchcombe area

England
- Broadcast area: Winchcombe, Gloucestershire, England
- Frequencies: 107.1 MHz; 106.9 MHz online/smart speaker

Programming
- Format: Talk, Music, Local Community interest

History
- First air date: April 2005

Links
- Website: www.radiowinchcombe.co.uk

Radio Winchcombe is an English local community radio station which broadcasts to Winchcombe and the surrounding areas.

In December 2011 it was announced on the station's Twitter and Facebook pages that it had received a full-time licence from Ofcom, allowing it to broadcast 24 hours a day, 7 days a week on FM to Winchcombe and the surrounding area. The frequency was later confirmed as 107.1 FM and the launch date as Friday 18 May 2012.

From 2005 to 2011, the station broadcast twice a year under Ofcom's Restricted Service Licence regime since its first broadcast in April 2005. The first broadcast was partly inspired by the success of the now defunct Forest of Dean Radio, and was the first community service in Gloucestershire to launch after FOD Radio. Radio Winchcombe was also the first RSL station in the UK to acquire a special emergency broadcast licence from Ofcom during the Gloucestershire floods in 2007 to aid communication in the community.

== Overview ==
Radio Winchcombe launched its full-time service on 107.1 FM and online on Friday 18 May 2012 at 7 am.

The station have increased their range of programmes over the years from their first two-day broadcast in 2005 to the current ten-day schedule they have in 2011. In January 2008, there was a trial three-day event where the station was only broadcasting on the internet. This meant that the station went on air a total of three times in 2008.

On 31 August 2009, Radio Winchcombe was featured as part of a Community Radio Showcase programme on BBC Radio Gloucestershire. BBC Radio Gloucestershire also produced a programme which came live from Abbey Terrace in May 2011, and the chairman of Radio Winchcombe was invited to talk about the community station.

Radio Winchcombe was the first and only radio station in the UK to set up an emergency broadcast, when Gloucestershire experienced the worst flooding on record. The station received praise from the community for helping communication in a time of need, providing information such as the location of temporary water distribution sites. The idea of an emergency broadcast began with a petition started by the chairman of the station to allow for free broadcasting in emergencies.

On March 12, 2023, Radio Winchcombe extended its area to cover the Bishops Cleeve, Woodmancote, Gotherington area on 106.9FM

Radio Winchcombe is a member of the Community Media Association. The station has also inspired similar projects in neighbouring towns, including Cirencester's Corinium Radio and the internet based North Cotswold Community Radio which broadcasts from Chipping Campden.

Radio Winchcombe went full-time on Friday 18 May 2012 at midnight with a brief show from Tom Roles and then officially at 7 am in the new Friday Breakfast Show with Charlie Box and Tom Roles (Programme Manager). Throughout the launch day there were a series of short documentaries aired as well as a live show at 4 pm for Hometime with Radio Winchcombe followed by another live show at 7 pm from Ryan Pearce playing requests and chart music followed by Ben Jones at 8 pm playing Dance and Electronica music. Other well-known original shows on the station include Saturday Sunshine with Adrian Malpass and Impromptu with John Oldham.
