= Cross Rhythms Plymouth =

- England
- Broadcast area: Plymouth
- Frequencies: FM: 96.3 MHz, DAB+: 9C

Programming
- Format: Christian Contemporary

Ownership
- Owner: Spirit of Plymouth

History
- First air date: 29 March 2007

Links
- Webcast: Listen live

Cross Rhythms Plymouth is a Christian community radio station broadcasting to Plymouth, Devon, England. The station is operated under a franchise agreement with Cross Rhythms in Stoke-on-Trent (who also own Cross Rhythms City Radio), but has separate ownership as required by Ofcom regulations.

The station first went on air on 29 March 2007.
