= Murder conviction without a body =

Conviction on circumstantial evidence

It is possible to convict someone of murder without the purported victim's body in evidence; however, cases of this type have historically been hard to prove, often forcing the prosecution to rely on circumstantial evidence, and in England there was for centuries a mistaken view that in the absence of a body a killer could not be tried for murder. Developments in forensic science in recent decades have made it more likely that a murder conviction can be obtained even if a body has not been found. In some such cases, the resurfacing of the victim in a live state has ensured the re-trial and acquittal, or pardon, of the alleged culprit, including posthumously, such as the case of the Campden Wonder or the case of William Jackson Marion.

== History ==
For centuries in England there was a mistaken view that without a body there could be no trial for murder, a misconception that arose following the Campden Wonder case of 1660. A local man had vanished, and after an investigation three individuals were hanged for his murder. Two years later, the supposed victim appeared alive and well, telling a story of having been abducted and enslaved in Turkey. The mistaken view of "no body, no murder" persisted into the 20th century; in the case of Mamie Stuart, who disappeared in late 1919, her husband George Shotton was not charged despite significant circumstantial evidence because her body had not been found. Before the advent of DNA testing, the discovery of a body in a decomposing or incomplete state would make this assumption questionable. In the case of Hawley Harvey Crippen, hanged in 1910 for the murder of his wife Cora, only fragments of the body were found in the Crippens' yard, and identified from a scar. Due to the body evidently having been buried after their moving in and Cora's unexplained disappearance, the remains were assumed to be from her murder but in 2007, DNA testing claimed the body fragments were from a dead male, raising doubts of the prosecutor's account.

The English murderer John George Haigh believed that dissolving a body in acid would make a murder conviction impossible. He had misinterpreted the Latin legal phrase corpus delicti (referring to the body of evidence which establishes a crime) to mean an actual human body. But evidence of a body was presented at his 1949 trial: part of the dentures from his last victim. The victim's dentist was able to identify them; Haigh was found guilty and hanged. In 1951, New Zealand criminal George Cecil Horry was convicted of the murder of his wife, although her body was never found. The Horry case helped to overturn in other common law jurisdictions the long-standing expectation that such cases would fail.

In the UK, the misapprehension that a killer could not be convicted solely on circumstantial evidence was directly addressed in the 1954 case of Michail Onufrejczyk. He and a fellow Pole, Stanislaw Sykut, had stayed in the United Kingdom after the Second World War and ran a farm together in Wales. Sykut disappeared and Onufrejczyk claimed that he had returned to Poland. Bone fragments and blood spatters were found in the farm kitchen, although forensic technology was then insufficiently advanced to identify them. Charged with Sykut's murder, Onufrejczyk claimed that the remains were those of rabbits he had killed, but the jury disbelieved him and he was sentenced to death, but reprieved. He appealed, but this was dismissed by the Lord Chief Justice, Lord Goddard, saying that "things had moved on since the days of the Campden Wonder", and added:

[I]t is equally clear that the fact of death, like any other fact, can be proved by circumstantial evidence, that is to say, evidence of facts which lead to one conclusion, provided that the jury are satisfied and are warned that it must lead to one conclusion only.

The 1960 California case of People v. Scott held that "circumstantial evidence, when sufficient to exclude every other reasonable hypothesis, may prove the death of a missing person, the existence of a homicide and the guilt of the accused". In Australia, circumstantial evidence was originally deemed sufficient to obtain a murder conviction in the murder of Louis Carron, and in others such as the Azaria Chamberlain case and Bradley John Murdoch. In Singapore, law student Sunny Ang was hanged in Changi Prison on 6 February 1967 for the alleged murder of his girlfriend during a scuba diving trip near Sisters' Islands. He was convicted purely based on circumstantial evidence and without a body, as his girlfriend's corpse was lost at sea and never found. Francis Seow, prosecuting, said in his opening statement, "This is an unusual case insofar as Singapore, or for that matter Malaysia, is concerned. This is the first case of its kind to be tried in our courts that there is no body." But he said that it would not mean that crafty killers would get away with murder and escape the brunt of the law. It would only mean that the burden of proof of the prosecution was higher, a burden which was eventually met and led to Ang's conviction.

== Other modern cases ==
=== 1980s ===
In 1984, Mark Tildesley, a seven-year-old schoolboy, disappeared after leaving his home to go to the fairground in Wokingham, England. In 1990, it emerged that on the night he disappeared, Tildesley had been abducted, drugged, tortured, raped and murdered by a London-based paedophile gang led by Sidney Cooke. Leslie Bailey was charged with murder in 1991 and the following year was given two life sentences. Bailey was murdered in prison by other inmates shortly afterwards.

The murder of Catrine da Costa centered on the limits of the necessity of a physical body to determine whether murder has been committed. As the remains of Da Costa's body lacked certain vital organs, making a determination of the case as one of murder, absent a confession, as seemingly impossible, although evidence suggested she had been dismembered by two alleged culprits. Following conviction and retrial for murder, both suspects were acquitted as, due to the cause of death being impossible to determine, a "natural" or non-homicidal cause could not be ruled out. In June 1985, Bournemouth woman Carole Packman vanished from her family home. Her husband, Russell Causley, claimed that she had left and did not want to be contacted. He later attempted to fake his own death in a £1 million life insurance fraud, after which the police investigated his role in Packman's disappearance. Causley was eventually convicted of the murder in 1996. That conviction was quashed on appeal in 2003, but after a retrial in 2004, he was again convicted of the murder.

In 1988, Helen McCourt, a 22-year-old insurance clerk from Lancashire disappeared. Ian Simms, a local pub landlord, was subsequently charged with and convicted of her murder. This case was also one of the first in the UK to use DNA fingerprinting. In July 1989, Kansas serial killer Richard Grissom was arrested after being connected to the disappearances of three young women the month prior. Blood and hair samples found in Grissom's car and garage led to prosecutors indicting him with three counts of murder. He was found guilty in 1990 and sentenced to life imprisonment.

American courts have also been allowed to press murder charges even if a body has not been recovered. In 1990, a Connecticut jury convicted Newtown airline pilot Richard Crafts of killing his Danish wife, Helle, in the 1986 "woodchipper murder", so called for the machine he had rented to dispose of her body in nearby lakes and streams. He was sentenced to 50 years in prison. The state police's forensic unit, led by Henry Lee, was able to match the DNA of some of the fragments that were discovered to Helle Crafts and the wood chipper her husband had used. It was the first bodyless murder trial in the state's history.

=== 1990s ===
In April 1994, Heidi Allen, 18, of New Haven, New York, was abducted from the convenience store where she worked. Her body has never been found. Brothers Gary and Richard Thibodeau were charged with kidnapping and murder. They were tried separately. Gary was found guilty and sentenced to 25 years to life, while Richard was acquitted. In 1996, Thomas Capano was convicted of the murder of Anne Marie Fahey, his former lover. Investigators did not have a murder weapon or body, nor any evidence that Capano had purchased a gun. He was convicted of first-degree murder in part due to the evidence given by his brother, Gerry, who had admitted to helping Capano dump Fahey's body in the Atlantic Ocean.

Sante Kimes and her son Kenneth were convicted of the murder of Irene Silverman, whose body was never found. They were also both suspects in another murder in the Bahamas where the body was never located. Kenneth eventually confessed to both murders but Sante Kimes maintained her innocence until she died in prison in 2014. In May 1999, the New Zealand High Court convicted Scott Watson of the murder of Ben Smart and Olivia Hope. Their bodies have never been found. In 1999, Willie Crain Jr. was convicted of the 1998 murder of seven-year-old Amanda Brown, whose body was never found, and sentenced to death in Florida.

=== 2000s ===
In 2000, prosecutors in Orange County secured New York State's first-ever bodyless murder conviction. Gregory Chrysler and Lawrence Weygant were found guilty of beating coworker Dominick Pendino to death with a baseball bat and disposing of his body, as they mistakenly believed he had given police the tip that had led to their arrest on drug-dealing charges. The prosecution relied on eyewitness testimony from a former girlfriend and police informant, as well as forensic evidence showing that enough of Pendino's blood stained a car seat for him to have died without immediate medical attention. Neither the body nor the bat have been recovered: Chrysler and Weygant are still in prison and refuse to say where the remains are, despite pleas from Pendino's family. Also in 2000, Gabriel Gómez was found guilty in Los Angeles County, California, United States, of murdering his half-sister Sandra Rosas, the wife of musician Cesar Rosas. Gómez was convicted without Sandra's body having been found, on the basis of her suspicious disappearance and her blood being found in his vehicle. After his conviction, Gómez led police to her remains.

In June 2001, Essex teenager Danielle Jones disappeared. Despite her body never being found, circumstantial evidence was provided by forensic analysis of text messages sent by her uncle Stuart Campbell, who was convicted of her murder 18 months later. Police determined that Campbell had sent messages from Jones's phone to his own after she disappeared, to make it appear that she was still alive, and noted that the spelling of several words changed after she was reported missing. Their suspicions were supported by records showing that Campbell's and Jones's phones were close to each other when the messages were sent. In October 2001, in Neuburg an der Donau, Germany, Rudolf Rupp vanished. He drank excessively, and was not well-liked. His wife, their two daughters and the elder daughter's fiancé all gave police confessions and they were convicted of manslaughter, or being an accomplice to manslaughter. There was no physical evidence of a crime. In 2009, Rupp's car—and his body—were found in the Danube, seemingly having got there after a collision. A retrial was held in 2010. All the original convictions were quashed on the grounds of insufficient evidence.

In 2002, Girly Chew Hossencofft's husband and his mistress were convicted of her murder, which occurred in 1999. Hossencofft's remains have never been located. In spite of advances in forensic technology, the possibility of the supposed victim turning up alive remains. In 2003, Leonard Fraser, having allegedly confessed to the murder of teenager Natasha Ryan, was on trial for this, and other murders, when she reappeared after having been missing for four years. In 2006, prosecutors in Nashville, Tennessee, had Perry March arrested and extradited from Mexico after he had been secretly indicted on charges of murdering his wife Janet, who had disappeared in 1996. An attempt to have March's in-laws killed while March was awaiting trial led to the arrest of his father, who as part of a plea agreement confessed to burying his daughter-in-law in a pile of brush near Bowling Green, Kentucky, but he was unable to lead police to the body after the intervening nine years. Perry March was convicted in 2006 almost ten years to the day after his wife disappeared.

In the Australian no-body trial for the murder of Keith William Allan, evidence from forensic accountants established a motive. The chance police finding of one perpetrator driving Allan's car and the conduct of all perpetrators, in particular mobile telephone records, were also important factors in their conviction. In 2007, in Omaha, Nebraska, Christopher Edwards was convicted of murdering his girlfriend Jessica O'Grady, whose body has never been found. His mattress was soaked with her blood. In 2008, Hans Reiser was convicted of first-degree murder of his wife, Nina Reiser. After conviction and before sentencing, Reiser pleaded guilty to the lesser charge of second-degree murder in exchange for disclosing the location of his wife's body.

=== 2010s ===
Known as the Banting murders of 2010 in Malaysia, 47-year-old cosmetics millionaire Datuk Sosilawati Lawiya and her three companions – 38-year-old bank officer Noorhisham Mohamad, 32-year-old lawyer Ahmad Kamil Abdul Karim, and her 44-year-old driver Kamaruddin Shamsuddin – disappeared after they last went to Banting to meet a lawyer over a land deal. N. Pathmanabhan, the lawyer who was supposed to meet the missing four, was found to have solicited the murders of the four by ordering his farm hands to kill the four missing people and burnt the victim's bodies at a farm which was registered under Pathmanabhan's name. Although none of the remains belonging to the victims were conclusively found, Pathmanabhan and three of his farmhands – T. Thilaiyalagan, R. Matan and R. Kathavarayan – were charged with murder. Matan was later acquitted of all charges and released due to insufficient evidence, but Pathmanabhan and the remaining two farm workers were found guilty of murder and sentenced to death based on circumstantial evidence and without the bodies of the victims.

In 2011, in Spain, Miguel Carcaño Delgado was sentenced to 20 years in prison for the murder of his ex-girlfriend Marta del Castillo, 17-year-old high school student from Seville, Andalusia. Del Castillo disappeared on January 24, 2009, despite extensive searches, her body was never found. In 2012, in Scotland, the prosecution secured two convictions without a body, for the murder of Suzanne Pilley and the murder of Arlene Fraser. In 2019, again in Scotland, the prosecution secured a conviction without a body for the murder of Margaret Fleming. In May 2013, Mark Bridger was convicted of the murder of April Jones, a five-year-old girl from Machynlleth, Wales, who disappeared on 1 October 2012. At his trial, Bridger claimed to have run her down in his car and killed her by accident, and to have no memory of what he did with her body after drinking heavily. The jury rejected his version of events, as bone fragments and blood discovered in Bridger's house within days of her disappearance were matched to the DNA of Jones. Her body was not found, despite the largest missing person search in UK history. Bridger claimed in court that Jones's DNA was found in his house as he had held her body there before disposing of it, but his claims were not believed by the jury.

In May 2014, Randy Taylor, a man from Nelson County, Virginia, was convicted for the abduction and murder of high school student Alexis Tiara Murphy, who vanished after being seen at a gas station in Lovingston. On December 3, 2020, Murphy's remains were located in Lovingston. The identification of the remains was announced publicly on February 17, 2021. On 12 July 2016, in Singapore, 48-year-old Leslie Khoo Kwee Hock allegedly killed his 31-year-old girlfriend Cui Yajie, a Tianjin-born Chinese engineer, in his car during a heated argument nearby Gardens by the Bay. Khoo took the body to a forest in Lim Chu Kang where he burnt the body for three days before he was arrested. By the time Khoo took the police to where he burnt the body, there were only ashes and a few clumps of hair, along with a bra hook and pieces of burnt fabric (from Cui's dress). Khoo was found guilty of murder on 12 July 2019, and a month later, on 19 August 2019, he was sentenced to life imprisonment.

=== 2020s ===
On 30 August 2022, Christopher Dawson was found guilty by a New South Wales court, of the murder of his former wife Lynette 40 years previously; despite the fact that her body was never found. In delivering his verdict, the judge in the case said: "None of the circumstances considered alone can establish Mr Dawson's guilt, but when regard is had to their combined force, I am left in no doubt. The only rational inference [is that] Lynette Dawson died on or about 8 January 1982 as a result of a conscious or voluntary act committed by Christopher Dawson."

Kristin Smart was last seen on the Cal Poly campus on May 25, 1996, walking home intoxicated after an off-campus party in the company of Paul Flores. When interviewed by investigators several days later, Flores had a black eye and scratches on his hands and knees, and later admitted to lying about how he got them. In 2019, the podcast Your Own Backyard reignited public interest in the case, and brought forward several new witnesses who spoke to police. A 2020 search of the suspect's home uncovered dozens of homemade videos of Flores sexually assaulting unconscious women. A 2021 search of his father's home located a 6-foot by 4-foot anomaly in the soil under his deck, and serological testing confirmed the presence of human blood. On October 18, 2022, a Monterey County jury found Paul Flores guilty of first-degree murder, while a separate jury acquitted his father, Ruben Flores, of accessory after the fact. Kristin Smart's body has not been recovered.

On February 22, 2023, Adam Montgomery was found guilty for the murder of his daughter Harmony Montgomery. Harmony, whose body has yet to be found, was last seen in December 2019 and reported two years by authorities after her father Adam got sole custody of her. On January 22, 2022, the police determined that Harmony was beaten to death by her father.

On February 24, 2023, Steven Lorenzo was sentenced to death for raping, torturing and murdering Jason Galehouse, whose body was never found till today. Lorenzo was also convicted of the rape-murder of Michael Wachholtz (whose dismembered body parts were found) and given a second death sentence as well. Both men went missing in Florida in December 2003 and were later found to be murdered by Lorenzo and an accomplice, Scott Schweickert, who later pleaded guilty and was sentenced to life in prison.

== Miscarriages of justice ==
A 1987 study of miscarriages of justice in the 20th-century United States by Hugo Bedau and Michael L. Radelet found seven cases where individuals were convicted of murder and the supposed murder victim was subsequently discovered to be alive.

== See also ==
- Adolph Luetgert
- Corpus delicti
- Henri Désiré Landru
- The Lady from Shanghai
- List of murder convictions without a body
- Lupara bianca
- Seznec affair
