= The Court House =

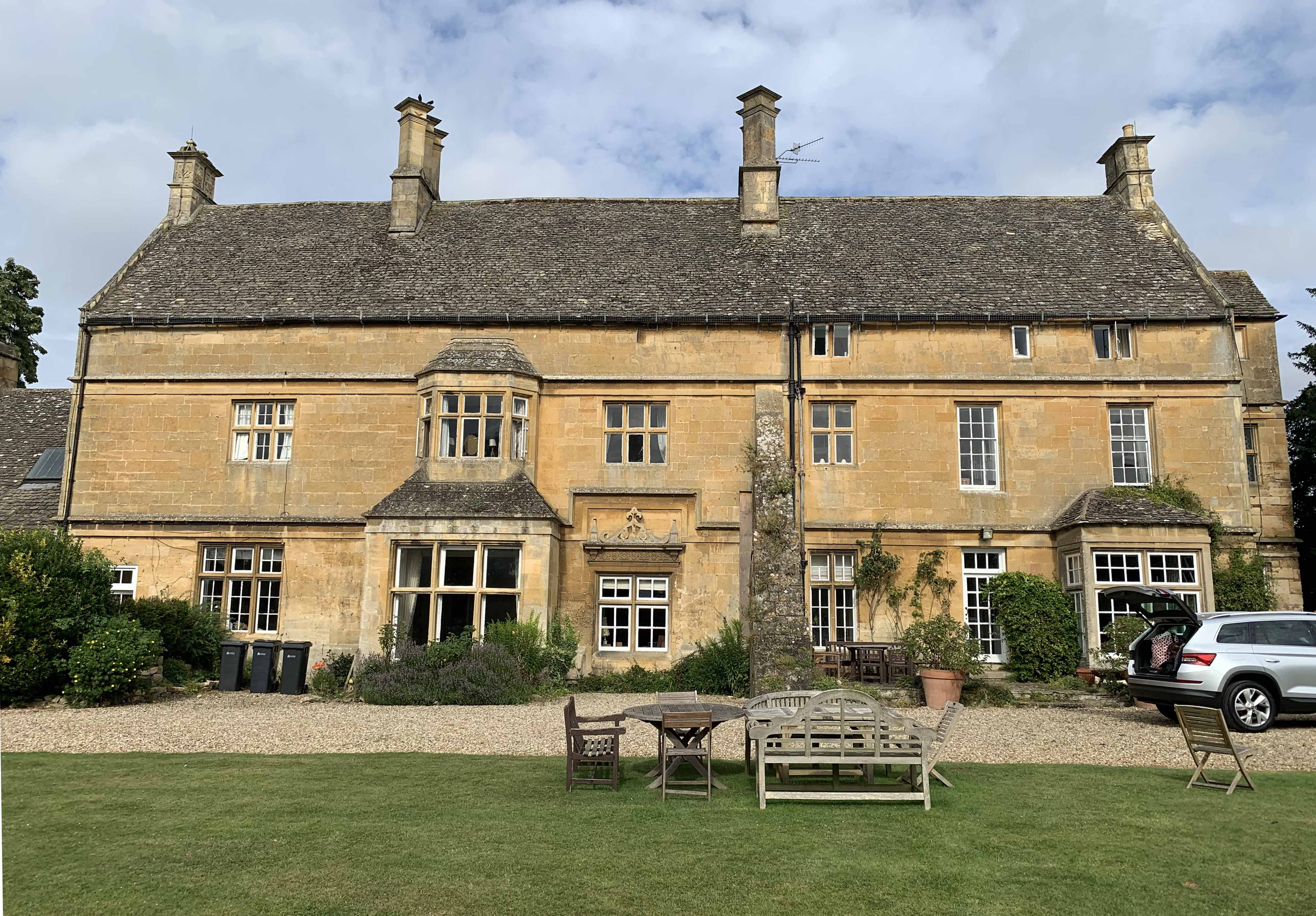
- The Court House, Chipping Campden
- Interactive map of the The Court House area

General information
- Architectural style: Jacobean
- Location: Calf Lane, Chipping Campden, Gloucestershire, England
- Coordinates: 52.0504°N 1.7799°W
- Year built: 17th century
- Owner: Private

Design and construction
- Architect: Unknown

The Court House is a historic Jacobean building located on Calf Lane in the town of Chipping Campden, Gloucestershire, England. The building dates back to the 17th century. It is a Grade II* listed building under the UK's statutory designation system for historically significant structures. The Court House is most likely a conversion of a stable block after Old Campden Manor was destroyed in 1645 during the English Civil War, when it was burned down in order to prevent it falling into the hands of Parliamentary forces.

== History ==
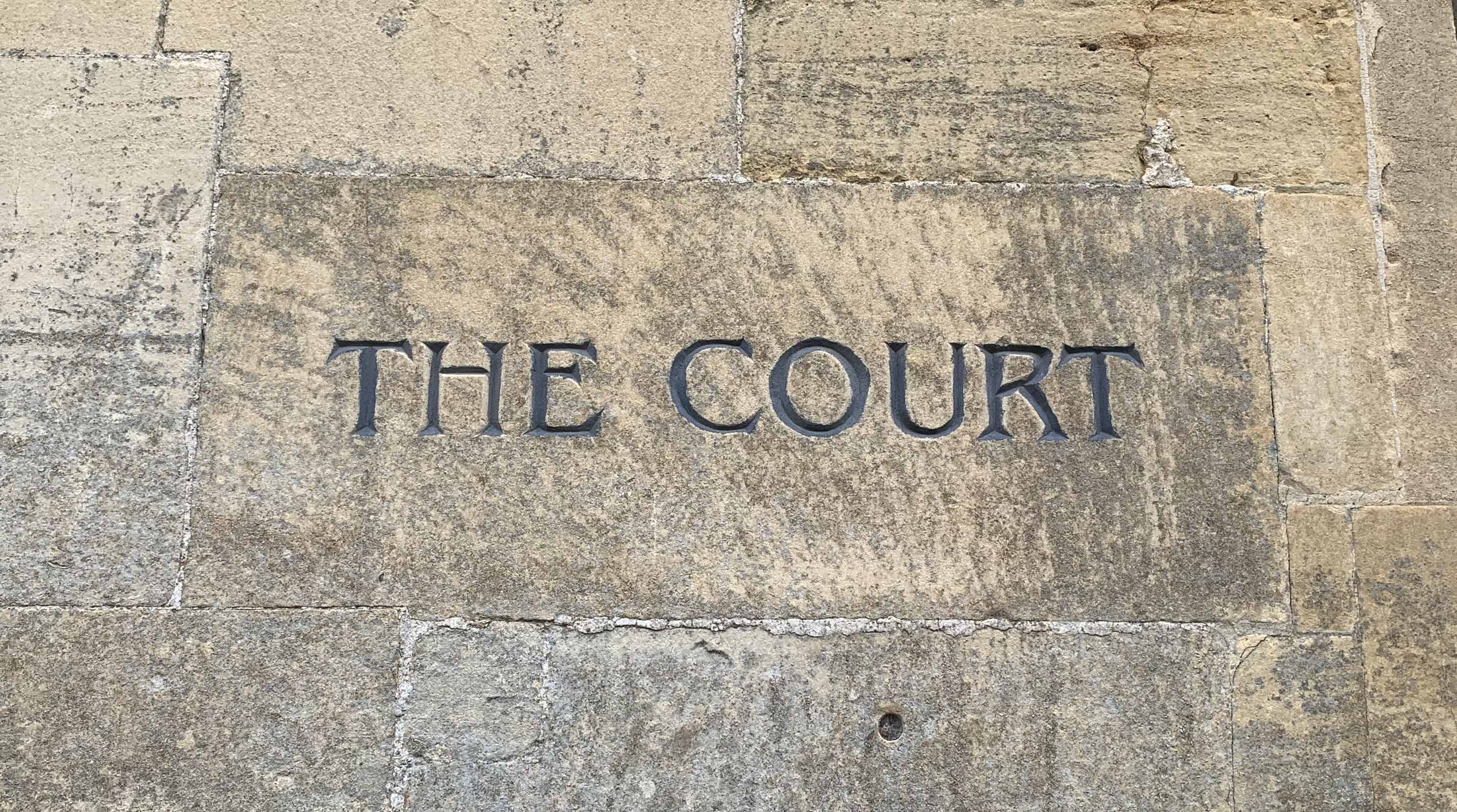
The Court, Calf Lane, Chipping Campden

The Court was constructed in the early 17th century, during the Jacobean period, presumably at around the same time as Old Campden Manor. Old Campden Manor was burned down during English Civil War, to prevent it falling into the hands of Parliamentary forces. The Court was most likely a stable block, and features architectural elements typical of the time, including stone mullioned windows, gables, and chimneys.

== Preservation Status ==
The Court House became a Grade II* listed building on 25 August 1960.

== Location ==
The Court is located on Calf Lane, which is situated near the centre of Chipping Campden, a market town known for its well-preserved historical buildings and Cotswold stone architecture.

== See also ==
- Chipping Campden
- Church of St James, Chipping Campden
- Chipping Campden Town Hall
