= Willie Crain Jr. =

American convicted child molestor and murderer (born 1946)

Willie Seth Crain Jr.
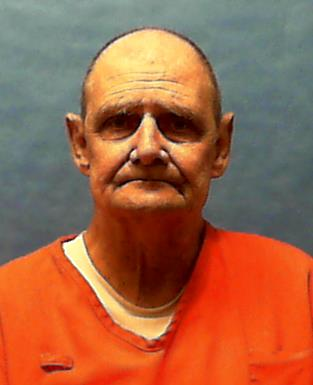
- Born: April 23, 1946 (age 80); Hillsborough County, Florida, U.S.
- Convictions: 1984; Child sexual abuse (x5); Aggravated child abuse; 1998; First-degree murder Kidnapping Possession of marijuana
- Penalty: 1984; 20 years' imprisonment; 1998; Death

Details
- Victims: 1 murder victim, 8+ rape victims
- Date: 1960s – 1998
- Location: Tampa, Florida
- Imprisoned at: Union Correctional Institution (death row); Florida State Prison (before execution)

Willie Seth Crain Jr. (born April 23, 1946) is an American convicted child murderer, child sex offender, and serial rapist on death row in Florida. In September 1998, Crain, who was convicted of sexually abusing five girls in 1985, had kidnapped and murdered seven-year-old Amanda Victoria Brown, whose body was never found.

Crain was arrested and charged with the kidnapping and murder of Brown, and found guilty of first-degree murder on September 13, 1999. Crain was sentenced to death on November 19, 1999, upon the jury's unanimous recommendation for capital punishment. He is scheduled to be executed on December 10, 2026.

== Early life ==
Willie Seth Crain Jr. was born on April 23, 1946, and grew up in Tampa, Florida, where his father, Willie Sr., made a living as a crab fisherman. Crain's family background was dysfunctional: Willie Sr. fathered Crain and 20 other children with three wives, while Crain's biological mother frequented bars and married nine times before she died in 1983. As a child, Crain was physically and sexually abused, and he dropped out of school in the second grade to help his father in crab fishing. Crain was married twice; his first wife left him three days after their wedding, while his second wife divorced him and later married one of Crain's older brothers. In 1980, Crain operated a highly successful raw seafood store in McKay Bay.

== Personal life ==
Between the mid-1960s and 1980s, Crain was involved in several rapes and sexual assaults of young girls. Crain's presumed first victim, who was eight years old at the time of the first rape, testified that Crain had repeatedly raped her in the mid-1960s, while another victim, who was ten back in 1970, was forced to have sex with Crain. Around 1978, Crain began to rape his girlfriend's nine-year-old daughter and the sexual abuse lasted until the girl was 14. Between July 1982 and May 1984, Crain also sexually assaulted another five young girls.

Crain was arrested in 1984 for raping five of his victims, and for five charges of child molestation, Crain was found guilty and sentenced to 20 years in prison. After serving 6 1/2 years in prison, Crain was released on probation, which was expected to last until 2053, but in May 1997, the probation was terminated.

Crain's family was entangled in a history of violent crimes; one of Crain's sisters-in-law, Florence, was found murdered in 1981. One of Crain's brothers, Linwood, was convicted of second-degree murder for strangling a 16-year-old girl in the 1980s, and after his release from prison, Linwood was convicted of unlawful firearm possession under federal law in 1999.

== Murder of Amanda Brown ==
On September 11, 1998, seven-year-old Amanda Victoria Brown (March 13, 1991 – September 11, 1998) disappeared from her house in Tampa, Florida, and Willie Crain was suspected of the crime. Two days before the murder, Brown's sister introduced her mother to Crain at a local bar. A few hours after they first met, Crain and Brown's mother went to the latter's trailer to spend time with each other. The next afternoon, Crain returned to the trailer, where Brown was present with her mother; the girl had spent the night before with her father. Brown and Crain played some games (like tic-tac-toe) and worked on Brown's homework. Afterwards, Crain left the trailer, coming back for dinner with Brown and her mother.

After dinner, Crain, Brown and her mother were inside a bedroom watching the 1997 movie Titanic. While watching the movie, Crain gave Brown's mother five sleeping pills, as medication for her body pain, while he himself took one. Brown's mother fell asleep for several hours, waking up to find her daughter and Crain missing. Based on circumstantial evidence, the prosecution said Crain had abducted Brown, killed her, and abandoned her body, possibly near where he set up his crab traps. According to a fisherman, Albert Darlington, during the 18 months before Brown went missing, Crain had told him twice that he could get rid of a body in a place that could never be found. Two women testified that Crain had admitted to killing Brown when they came to visit Crain's grandchildren. Brown's body was never found.

The police questioned Crain about Brown's disappearance, in part due to his 1984 conviction for child sex offenses, but he was not a suspect at that point, and he was released from police custody.

On October 2, 1998, Crain was arrested and charged as a prime suspect in Brown's disappearance and murder. In fact, two weeks prior to his arrest for murder, Crain was detained for two charges of raping young girls back in 1969 and 1971. The police revealed that they found bloodstains containing Brown's DNA on Crain's underwear, and more bloodstains with Brown's DNA were found on the toilet seat in Crain's bathroom and on a piece of toilet paper in the toilet bowl. The arrest warrant stated that on the date of Brown's disappearance, Crain had long, fresh scratches on his arms. According to DNA expert Martin Tracey, the odds of identifying someone else apart from Brown as the owner of the bloodstain was one in 388 million.

== Murder trial and death penalty ==
On September 6, 1999, Crain's murder trial began before a Hillsborough County jury. On September 13, 1999, the jury found Crain guilty of the first-degree murder of Brown. As the trial moved on to the sentencing phase, three of the victims who were previously raped by Crain came to court to testify against him.

On September 18, 1999, the jury voted 12–0 to recommend the death penalty for Crain, whose defense of a troubled childhood was rejected as a mitigating factor by the jury. Circuit Judge Barbara Fleischer, the trial judge, was tentatively set to formally sentence Crain on October 11, 1999. During a jailhouse interview after the jury's verdict, Crain continued to insist on his innocence and said he was not afraid to die.

On October 11, 1999, during a court hearing before formal sentencing, Crain criticized the judicial system in general, and even criticized his lawyers aside from the prosecution, and stated he was being "sold down the river" and sent to death row by the system. Crain accused Brown's parents of the murder, stating that he was innocent.

On November 19, 1999, Crain was officially sentenced to death by Judge Fleischer, who followed the jury's recommendation and cited Crain's sex offenses and other aggravating factors behind Brown's murder.

== Death row ==
A 2019 news report revealed that Crain was one of 105 death row prisoners convicted for murders committed within Central Florida. As of May 2019, Crain was listed as one of Florida's 19 inmates condemned to death row for murders that took place within Hillsborough County.

=== Appellate process ===
On October 29, 2004, the Florida Supreme Court upheld his death sentence.

On October 13, 2011, the Florida Supreme Court rejected Crain's post-conviction appeal. On April 5, 2018, the Florida Supreme Court dismissed Crain's third appeal. On March 22, 2019, Crain's federal appeal was denied by the 11th Circuit Court of Appeals.

On October 10, 2023, the U.S. Supreme Court turned down Crain's final appeal against his death sentence.

=== Other developments ===
In August 2000, less than a year after he was condemned to death row, Crain's rape charges for the 1960s and 1970s cases were all withdrawn by the prosecution. In part due to his death sentence and conviction for murder, the prosecution decided it was unnecessary to try Crain for another crime. Crain was handed a 364-day sentence after he pleaded guilty to one count of marijuana possession.

In 2005, the fathers of Brown and another murdered girl, Jessica Lunsford, joined in the search for a missing girl named Sarah Lunde, who was later found to be murdered by a registered sex offender named David Lee Onstott, who confessed to the murder. Onstott was convicted of second-degree murder and sentenced to life in prison.

In 2009, it was reported that Brown's biological father first wrote letters to Crain back in 2006, hoping that he would reveal the location of his daughter's body, and Crain responded after three years and was willing to help, despite maintaining his innocence. However, the Florida Department of Corrections refused the request for Crain and Brown's father to meet each other, citing security concerns.

== Scheduled execution ==
On November 10, 2026, Governor Ron Desantis signed a death warrant for Crain, scheduling him to be executed on December 10, 2026, tentatively at 6 p.m.

As of 2026, Crain is incarcerated at the Florida State Prison, where his death sentence is set to be carried out by lethal injection.

== Aftermath ==
In December 1998, the disappearance and murder of Amanda Brown was listed as one of Florida's most high-profile cases of murdered or missing children to happen in that year.

The murder case was one of the most notable cases prosecuted by Jay Pruner, who served 35 years as a prosecutor and retired in 2021.

By 2023, in light of the indictment of Tomasz Kosowski for killing Largo lawyer Steven Cozzi in the absence of a body, the case of Willie Crain was recalled as one of Florida's most high-profile cases of murder convictions without a body. Kosowski was found guilty of the murder, and sentenced to death on November 20, 2026.

== See also ==
- Capital punishment in Florida
- List of death row inmates in the United States § Florida
- List of people scheduled to be executed in the United States
- Murder conviction without a body
- List of murder convictions without a body
