= Campden Wonder =

1660 legal case in England

The "Campden Wonder" is the name given to events surrounding the return of William Harrison, thought to have been murdered in the town of Chipping Campden, Gloucestershire, England, in the 17th century. A family servant and the servant's mother and brother were hanged for killing their master, but following the man's return it became clear that no murder had taken place, despite the testimony of one of the accused.

The story attracted popular attention in England in the years 1660–1662. The events were documented by local gentleman and justice of the peace Sir Thomas Overbury in a pamphlet titled "A true and perfect account of the examination, confession, trial, condemnation and execution of Joan Perry, and her two sons, John and Richard Perry, for the supposed murder of Will. Harrison" and an accompanying letter by Harrison which had details of his whereabouts during the years that he had gone missing.

== Disappearance ==
On 16 August 1660, in Chipping Campden, at the home of William Harrison, the 70-year-old man stated his intention to walk the 2 miles (3.2 km) to the village of Charingworth, and left. When he did not return home at the expected time, his wife sent his manservant John Perry to look for him. Neither Harrison nor Perry had returned by the next morning.

William Harrison's son Edward Harrison then set out to look for the pair. On his way to Charingworth he met John Perry. The servant said that he had not been able to find his master. Perry and Edward continued to Ebrington, where they questioned one of the tenants whom Harrison had been going to see. The tenant said that Harrison had been there the previous night. Edward Harrison and John Perry then went to the village of Paxford, but their search proved fruitless.

Edward and John then headed back to Chipping Campden. During the journey they heard that some items belonging to William Harrison had been discovered on the main road between Chipping Campden and Ebrington. These included a hat, a shirt and a neckband. The hat had been slashed by a sharp implement, and the shirt and the neckband were covered in blood; there was no sign of the body of William Harrison.

== Investigation ==
Under questioning, John Perry said that he knew Harrison had been murdered, but Perry claimed to be innocent of the crime. He then said that his mother Joan and his brother Richard had killed Harrison for his money and hidden the body. Joan and Richard denied that they had had anything to do with Harrison's disappearance, but John continued to say that they were guilty, claiming they had dumped his body in a millpond. The pond was dredged, but no body was found.

== Trials ==
The first court hearings were held on charges which resulted from an alleged plot to steal money from William Harrison. Joan and Richard Perry pleaded not guilty. The jury found them guilty, based on John's testimony; the following reasons were cited:

1. A few weeks before Harrison's disappearance, John had lied about being attacked by robbers.
2. John said that he had suggested to Richard that they rob Harrison.
3. John seemed to have no good reason to lie about a plot to steal money from Harrison.
4. John said that during the previous year, Joan and Richard had stolen £140 from William Harrison's house (equivalent to £19,000 in 2019).

Since the defendants were first-time offenders, they were eligible for an automatic pardon under the Indemnity and Oblivion Act 1660, so they followed the advice of their lawyers and changed their pleas to guilty. Writer Linda Stratmann states that their lawyers had given bad advice to the Perrys, as the potential criminal charge of murder was as yet unresolved. Since there was no body of the alleged victim, the judge refused to prosecute the Perrys for murder.

In spring 1661, the court reconvened to hear the charge of murder. Because the Perrys had previously pleaded guilty to the charge of robbery, the defendants were now considered to be convicted criminals. This time John Perry joined his mother and brother in pleading not guilty in the killing of William Harrison. The servant claimed that his original testimony had been false due to reason of insanity. Nevertheless, the jury found all three of the Perrys guilty, and all were sentenced to death.

The Perrys were hanged together on Broadway Hill in Gloucestershire. As Joan Perry was suspected of being a witch, she was executed first, in order to break any spell that she might have cast upon her sons to prevent them from confessing their guilt. On the scaffold, Richard and John reiterated that they were entirely innocent of killing William Harrison. Broadway Tower now stands on the site of the hanging.

== Return of William Harrison ==
In 1662, Harrison returned to England aboard a ship from Lisbon. He claimed that he had been abducted, wounded, had his pockets stuffed with money and been spirited away on horses from England via Deal in Kent, transferred to a Turkish ship and sold into slavery in the Ottoman Empire. Harrison said that after about a year and three quarters his master had died and that he then went to a port and stowed away on a Portuguese ship, finally returning to Dover by way of Lisbon.

The case led to the popular belief that England had a rule in criminal law of "no body, no murder". James Morton states that this is a misconception and that no such rule existed.

Linda Stratmann, in her book Gloucestershire Murders, states that Harrison's story is questionable on several points: the abduction of a 70-year-old man, his pockets being stuffed with money and his selling into slavery for a few pounds; his being taken on horseback from Chipping Campden to Deal unnoticed; and his claims that his attackers wounded him in the thigh and side with a sword, then nursed him back to health. It has been suggested that the actual reason for Harrison's disappearance was that he had felt it expedient to leave the country due to the volatile situation surrounding the recent Stuart Restoration.

== Adaptations ==
John Masefield wrote two plays on the subject: The Campden Wonder and Mrs Harrison. The latter dealt with the popular myth that Harrison's wife committed suicide on learning that her husband was alive.

The case is mentioned, along with the Sandyford murder case, in E. C. Bentley's detective novel Trent's Last Case (1920). It is also mentioned (as the "Camden Mystery") in John Rhode's detective novel In Face of the Verdict (in the U.S., In the Face of the Verdict; 1936). Another novel by Victoria Bennett called The Poorest He (2005) gives a fictional account of the case. The case (referred to as the "Campden Wonder") is an important side plot in the 2024 novel Killing Time by M.C. Beaton.

There is also a radio play of the story dating from 1994, Roger Hume's The Campden Wonder.

The final track on Inkubus Sukkubus's 2016 album Barrow Wake is a musical telling of the tale.

== See also ==
- List of solved missing person cases
