= Corinium Radio =

British online radio station

Coordinates: 51.7173°N 1.9654°W

England
- Broadcast area: Cirencester, the Cotswolds
- Frequencies: Online and via smart devices

Programming
- Format: Community news, interests and music for the Cotswolds

Ownership
- Owner: Independent, not-for-profit constituted group

Links
- Website: www.coriniumradio.co.uk

Corinium Radio is an online community radio station in Cirencester, Gloucestershire. Launched in 2006, it first broadcast on a two-day Restricted Service Licence, becoming a full-time Internet-broadcasting community radio station in October 2014.

Entirely volunteer-run, Corinium Radio provides round-the-clock community news, information and music covering a range of different genres.

== History ==
Corinium Radio was originally commissioned by the Gloucestershire County Arts Advisory Group to promote and develop community media. With the help of Forest of Dean Radio the station developed, and it broadcast in May 2006 for the first time.

In 2016, Corinium Radio was presented with the Creative Champion award by Cirencester Chamber of Commerce. In 2017, the station was voted the Best Community Radio Station in the Cotswolds. In 2019, it was one of five stations shortlisted for Digital or RSL Station of the Year in the UK's Community Radio Awards.

== Structure ==
Corinium Radio's programming features music, talk, news and information, with shows spanning a variety of different interests and topics chosen by programme-makers. The station also has an outside broadcast team that provides live and recorded coverage of local events, such as music festivals and Advent or Christmas celebrations.

Through the Corinium Radio Collective, the station works closely with local schools and colleges, offering work experience to students who are interested in a career in the media, as well as with the business and community sectors, enabling them to broaden their reach through the creation of and support for specific programmes.

The station operates as a not-for-profit organisation, with all members of the team participating as volunteers. Its organisational structure consists of directors, a management team and open forum meetings allowing for input from all volunteers.

== Trivia ==
In Corinium Radio's fifth broadcast, poet Pam Ayres was interviewed on the station.

In August 2009, Corinium Radio was featured as part of a Community Radio Showcase programme on BBC Radio Gloucestershire. Then-chair of Corinium Radio Liz Young was interviewed and a clip from the station's breakfast show was broadcast.

In November 2009, the station management said that their winter broadcast was heard by 10% of the local population, around the same as the local BBC station.

In 2018, Corinium Radio produced a video-short of how the community came together to create the biggest human poppy.

In 2019, the station broadcast an interview with former Strictly Come Dancing professional dancer Chloe Hewitt. Later that year, TV doctor Dr Dawn Harper participated in an interview for broadcast on air. At the end of the year, members of the station interviewed TV presenter Ellie Harrison.
