= Cross Rhythms =

British Christian media organisation

The Cross Rhythms logo

Cross Rhythms is a Christian media organisation based in Stoke-on-Trent, England. It operates an FM and online radio station, produces radio shows sent internationally, and its website has resources about contemporary Christian music.

== History ==
=== 1983–2002 ===
In 1983, Chris Cole started a 30-minute weekly Christian music radio show on Plymouth Sound FM, an Independent Local Radio station in Plymouth. Originally titled The Solid Rock of Jesus Christ, the programme aired on Sunday evenings. It grew into a one-hour programme, and became one of the most listened to programmes in its time slot in South Devon. The show continued until 1996.

In May 1990, music journalist Tony Cummings founded the magazine Cross Rhythms. In 1991, publication of the magazine was taken over by Cole's publishing company, Cornerstone House. That same year, Cross Rhythms took over the organisation and management, of what had previously been the Umberleigh Rock Gospel Festival. The event was renamed to the Cross Rhythms Festival, and continued to be held annually until 2003. In 1992, the radio show was renamed the Cross Rhythms Experience, and became a syndicated show in 1993. By 1995, the magazine had a readership of about 15,000.

Cross Rhythms, in partnership with United Christian Broadcasters (UCB), launched a satellite radio channel in 1998 (broadcasting to the UK and Europe on digital satellite). At the same time, Cross Rhythms moved its base from Plymouth to Stoke-on-Trent, and shared facilities with UCB. The partnership continued until 2002, when Cross Rhythms was granted a pilot licence for a new form of local radio (then called access radio, but now known as community radio). Cross Rhythms City Radio went on air in February 2002. At the same time as obtaining the FM licence for Cross Rhythms City Radio, Cross Rhythms moved out of UCB's headquarters and into Conway House, the former home of BBC Radio Stoke.

=== 2003–present ===
The last Cross Rhythms Festival was held in 2003. The festival was subsequently re-launched as a partnership with Gilead Foundations, under the new name of the Arrow Festival. The editorial content of the magazine is now carried by the Cross Rhythms website. To help finance the expansion of the radio aspect of the organisation, Cross Rhythms Direct was launched in 2003 as an online Christian music shop.

In addition to operating Cross Rhythms City Radio and the Cross Rhythms website (which has a review section of Christian music releases and life-based articles by a selection of writers including Mal Fletcher and Paul Poulton), Cross Rhythms also provides syndicated radio programming for a number of other radio stations, mostly community based and music review content for several publications including the UK Christian retail trade magazine Christian Marketplace.

The Cross Rhythms magazine ceased publication in 2005.

The name "Cross Rhythms" is also used by two other UK community radio stations. Cross Rhythms Plymouth was launched on 29 March 2007, and Cross Rhythms Teesside 107.1 FM was launched on 27 April 2008. Although using the name, these stations are under separate ownership, as required by Ofcom regulations. The use of the Cross Rhythms brand is part of a franchise agreement, whereby the new stations will take syndicated programming from Cross Rhythms, outside their own core broadcasting hours while retaining full editorial independence.
