= Ryan S. Blinston =

American spree killer

Ryan Scott Blinston
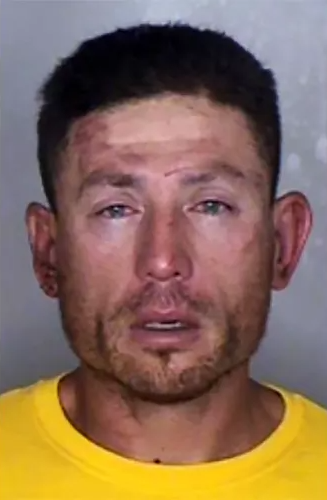
- Born: August 26, 1983 (age 43); California, U.S.
- Occupation: Tree trimmer
- Years active: 2020
- Status: Incarcerated
- Convictions: Murder (x3); Attempted murder (x2); Arson; Resisting arrest
- Penalty: Life imprisonment without parole

Details
- Victims: 3
- Country: United States
- State: California
- Date apprehended: June 14, 2020
- Imprisoned at: Pleasant Valley State Prison

Ryan Scott Blinston (born August 26, 1983) is an American spree killer and arsonist who murdered three women in Oroville, California, between May and June 2020. His modus operandi typically consisted of murdering clients he worked for at his tree-trimming job. Blinston was caught by a SWAT team while attempting to murder another man with a hatchet. He was later found guilty of the murders and sentenced to life in prison without the possibility of parole.

== Early life ==
Little is known about Blinston's childhood. Born in California on August 26, 1983, he first came to attention of law enforcement in 2006, at age 22, when he stole a black Ford Explorer in Hanover, New Hampshire, and kept it in his possession for three days. He was convicted on a felony theft charge. He moved back to California afterwards, where, in 2013, he burglarized three homes, stealing three guns and a Lexus. He was imprisoned for these crimes at Pleasant Valley State Prison in Coalinga, California.

== Murders ==
On the morning of May 23, 2020, Blinston broke into the Los Molinos home of Loreen Severs, 88, and Homer Severs, 91. After locating them in the house, Blinston cut the throats of the couple, killing Loreen Severs, and injuring Homer Severs. Five days prior to the attack, Blinston did tree-trimming work at the Severs' house as part of his landscaping job. GPS evidence indicated that Blinston returned to the house the evening before the murders in what the police described as a "scouting trip." Blinston then returned to his home in Oroville.

Then, on June 4, 2020, Blinston did tree-trimming work as part of a landscaping team serviced at the Oroville home of Sandra George, 82. After the landscaping crew left, Blinston went back to the home by himself, and fatally stabbed Sandra George in the throat. Her body was found at 5:00 p.m. the following day.

Two days later, on June 6, 2020, 56-year-old Vicky Cline was last seen alive with Ryan Blinston in downtown Oroville. On the same day, Cline's car was set on fire between Pine Street and Robinson street in Oroville. An investigation revealed that the car had been deliberately set ablaze with an accelerant. On June 21, 2020, Vicky Cline's remains were found by a fisherman in the Feather River near Belden, California. Like the other victims, her throat was slashed.

== Capture ==
Authorities forensically matched blood and DNA found on Blinston's car to Vicky Cline. After a week of searching, the Butte County SWAT team located his whereabouts on June 14, 2020: a motorhome in a wooded area of Brush Creek, California. When the SWAT team arrived, they found Blinston trying to break into the home with a hatchet. Blinston then ran into the forest, but was caught shortly after.

The owner of the motorhome was a 50-year-old man who allowed Blinston to stay at the home overnight. After the man went to sleep, he woke up to Blinston attacking him with a knife. Despite being stabbed in the throat, the man was able fight off Blinston and lock him out. After Blinston walked away from the motorhome to retrieve a hatchet, he returned and tried to break into the house again. The man was seriously injured, but survived.

== Trial ==
Blinston was charged with three counts of first-degree murder, two counts of attempted murder, arson, and resisting arrest, to which he pleaded not guilty. Blinston's trial started on May 2, 2022. Hundreds of pieces of evidence in the forms of photographs, diagrams, phone data, business records, and surveillance videos, were presented to the jury. Additionally, 35 witnesses testified against Blinston. Ryan Blinston himself did not testify. Blinston was found guilty on all charges on August 4, 2022, and received three life sentences without the possibility of parole.

Blinston was imprisoned in the North Kern State Prison, but is now currently imprisoned in the Pleasant Valley State Prison.

== See also ==
- Crime in California
- List of serial killers active in the 2020s
- List of serial killers in the United States
