= New Style Radio =

- England
- Broadcast area: Birmingham
- Frequency: 98.7 MHz

Programming
- Format: African-Caribbean

History
- First air date: 14 August 2002

Links
- Website: http://www.newstyleradio.co.uk/

New Style Radio 98.7 FM was a community radio station based in Birmingham, England, and broadcasting to the city's African-Caribbean community. The station, launched on 14 August 2002, was born out of 15 years of short-term radio broadcasting and training, including a long run of restricted service licence activities. The 98.7FM transmitter has been off air since 1st April 2022, with the station broadcasting online only since then. The Ofcom Radio Broadcast Update September 2025 confirmed that the community FM licence has been rescinded.

The service was intended to be reflective of African-Caribbean culture and aspiration in particular and of multicultural Birmingham in general. It was historic in being the first licensed African-Caribbean radio station in Britain.

New Style Radio was run mainly by unpaid volunteers and was part of the Afro-Caribbean Millennium Centre, a registered charity set up to support the educational and social needs of the Afro-Caribbean community in the West Midlands.

In 2020, Ofcom censured the station for broadcasting COVID-19 conspiracy theories on a discussion segment.
