= George Cecil Horry =

New Zealand murderer

George Cecil Horry (6 May 1907 – 29 April 1981) was a British-born New Zealand criminal.

In 1951, he became the first person in more than 300 years to be convicted under English common law for the murder of a victim of whose body was never found. The victim was his newly married wife, Eileen.

By 1951 when Horry was arrested he had accumulated 64 convictions (and been conscripted into the New Zealand Army in 1944). The jury accepted the circumstantial evidence and found him guilty. Although New Zealand had recently reinstated the death penalty, Horry instead received a life sentence since the law had not been in effect at the time of the murder. Although one of the officers who interviewed Horry in 1943 had retired, his written record of the interview enabled him to recall the details.

Horry was released from prison in 1967, and died in Auckland as "George Taylor" (having changed his name by deed poll) in 1981, leaving a wife and child.
