= Murder of Steven Cozzi =

2023 disappearance of a lawyer in Largo, Florida

Steven Cozzi
- Born: Steven Cozzi; May 12, 1981; Florida, United States
- Disappeared: March 21, 2023 (aged 41); Largo, Florida, United States
- Status: Missing for 3 years, 8 months and 1 day; presumed murdered on March 21, 2023 (aged 41)
- Died: c. March 21, 2023 (aged 41)
- Cause of death: Unknown, but allegedly murdered

On March 21, 2023, 41-year-old Steven Cozzi (born May 12, 1981 - March 21, 2023), an American lawyer from Largo, Florida, disappeared under what investigators described as suspicious circumstances. As the investigation unfolded, authorities came to suspect that Cozzi had been murdered, leading to the arrest of plastic surgeon Tomasz Kosowski, who was charged with first-degree murder. After a trial in September 2026, Kosowski was convicted of the murder in spite of the absence of the victim's body. He was sentenced to death on November 20, 2026. Despite extensive search efforts, Cozzi’s body has never been found.

== Background ==
=== Victim ===
Steven Cozzi was born on May 12, 1981, in Florida. The details of his early life are largely unknown. He completed an undergraduate degree in theater, and worked as a wardrobe technician in Broadway theatre productions for seven years before he pursued a career in law. Cozzi completed his law degree from Stetson University in Florida in 2016, and he started to work at Blanchard Law in 2018. Cozzi began a relationship with Michael Montgomery after they met on a dating app in the summer of 2018. Cozzi and Montgomery married in October 2020 amidst the COVID-19 pandemic in the United States, and their marriage lasted until Cozzi was murdered in 2023.

=== Perpetrator ===
Tomasz Roman Kosowski was born in Poland on January 8, 1979. His family immigrated to the United States in the 1980s to escape oppression from the Cold War and settled in Kansas City, Kansas. Kosowski grew up in Kansas and New Mexico. Initially, Kosowski spoke no English and struggled to adapt to the American way of life before he mastered the language. By middle school, however, he had become an honor-roll student. The family later moved to Albuquerque, New Mexico, where Kosowski continued to excel academically. He attended the University of New Mexico, studying music with a focus on classical guitar as well as biochemistry. He graduated with bachelor's degrees in both fields and earned a master's degree in molecular biology.

Kosowski received a scholarship to Dartmouth College's Geisel School of Medicine in New Hampshire, where he completed a medical degree and an MBA from Dartmouth's Tuck School of Business. He completed plastic surgery fellowships in New York, Atlanta and Miami before working at clinics in South Florida and Orlando. Kosowski joined the Laufer Institute of Plastic Surgery in 2016, and became renowned for his expertise in facelifts and using patients' own fat for breast and buttock enhancement.

Kosowski worked for two years at Laufer before he left to set up his independent practice. However, from 2019 onwards, his career was affected by the legal disputes between him and Laufer. Cozzi represented Laufer in the matters.

== Disappearance and death ==
In 2019, one year after he left Laufer, Tomasz Kosowski filed a civil lawsuit against his former workplace and some of its employees over medical billing disputes for Kosowski's previous surgeries, and a former patient said that Kosowski had botched her breast surgery. According to Kosowski, his professional reputation was damaged by the negative online reviews that arose from the case despite its eventual dismissal by the courts. Although Kosowski filed the lawsuit through his lawyers, he started representing himself in 2022 and came face to face with Cozzi and other lawyers representing Laufer.

The situation grew more heated as Cozzi and the other lawyers representing Laufer found that Kosowski had been filing baseless claims and raised their concerns to the courts. Kosowski tried to get Cozzi removed from the case, accused Cozzi of tampering with the documents, and argued over the dates on the patient invoices. Sometime in January 2023, Kosowski called Cozzi a "scumbag" during an encounter at the latter's law firm.

The prosecution stated that these conflicts motivated Kosowski to plan Cozzi’s murder. Prosecutors presented evidence suggesting that the planning and preparation began several months before Cozzi’s disappearance on March 21, 2023. In December 2022, Kosowski purchased a gray Toyota Tundra for $32,000 in cash but did not immediately register the vehicle. He also purchased a wagon that prosecutors later linked to the crime scene. Approximately two weeks before Cozzi’s disappearance, surveillance footage allegedly showed Kosowski surveying the exterior of Cozzi’s law firm. About a week later, he was seen inside an electrical closet in the building while wearing a surgical mask. A cardboard box containing a wagon was found inside the closet.

On March 21, 2023, Cozzi arrived at his law office as usual. At approximately 9:50 a.m., he was last seen entering the men’s bathroom, after which he disappeared. According to missing-persons reports, Cozzi’s wallet, keys, and cellphone were left inside the office, while his car remained parked in the law firm’s parking lot. The prosecution said that Kosowski killed Cozzi inside the men’s restroom. They stated that Kosowski obtained succinylcholine, a paralytic drug, along with syringes, to facilitate the killing. Investigators later found Cozzi’s blood and a mixture of Cozzi’s and Kosowski’s DNA in and around the restroom, as well as bloodstains on various surfaces. A strong chemical odor was also reportedly detected inside the bathroom.

Prosecutors stated that Kosowski incapacitated Cozzi before killing him. Surveillance footage showed a man transporting a heavy object covered by a red blanket in a collapsible wagon and loading it into Kosowski’s Toyota Tundra. Prosecutors argued that the wagon contained Cozzi’s body. Kosowski then drove away from the law firm, and investigators subsequently traced the vehicle toward a remote dumpster near the Tamiami Trail, where prosecutors said Cozzi’s body had been disposed of. However, Cozzi’s remains have never been recovered, and the precise cause and manner of his death could not be conclusively established.

== Charges and pre-trial developments ==
On March 25, 2023, four days after Cozzi's disappearance, Kosowski was arrested and held at the Pinellas County Jail. By then, the investigations reclassified Cozzi’s disappearance as murder. At the time of his arrest, Kosowski had nearly $300,000 in cash and two passports in his possession. A black duffel bag was also recovered from his car, and it contained an assortment of various items that included masks, duct tape, plastic bags containing miscellaneous patches, flashlights, lighters, scissors, a folding knife, brass knuckles, a taser, crowbar, and a syringe with succinylcholine.

On March 27, 2023, Kosowski was charged with first-degree murder in Cozzi's death. On April 28, 2023, Bruce Bartlett, the state attorney for the Sixth Judicial Circuit of Florida, announced that his office would seek the death penalty against Kosowski. Under Florida state law, the offense of first-degree murder carries the death penalty or life imprisonment without the possibility of parole as potential punishments.

On May 28, 2025, Kosowski informed the court that he still could not find any new counsel because he did not have any money to hire any private attorneys, and therefore, he was set to be represented by a court-appointed lawyer in his upcoming trial. By July 2025, two private lawyers were appointed, and Kosowski's trial, which was initially slated for May 2025, was set to be rescheduled after a September 2025 hearing.

On August 6, 2026, Kosowski once again dismissed his lawyers and asked to represent himself in his upcoming trial, and he additionally waived putting up his defense during the penalty phase of the trial, in which he could potentially make a mitigation plea to seek life in prison instead of death. Pinellas Circuit Judge Joseph Bulone granted Kosowski's request after an hour-long hearing.

On August 21, 2026, Kosowski withdrew all the pending motions filed by his previous counsel, in which they opposed including the death penalty as an option in his trial proceedings, and he further expressed he did not want a jury to decide on his sentence if he was convicted. Jury selection was scheduled for September 14, 2026, for the guilt or innocence phase of his trial.

On August 31, 2026, Kosowski waived his right to a jury in his upcoming trial, and opted to have the trial judge to preside over his case and decide on the conviction and sentence. When asked why he chose a bench trial, Kosowski refused to answer.

== Trial ==
On September 14, 2026, Kosowski stood trial for Cozzi's murder at the Pinellas County Circuit Court, and Pinellas Judge Joseph Bulone presided over the case and would decide on the verdict.

The prosecution offered evidence and testimony to prove that Kosowski was responsible for Cozzi's disappearance and murder, and several witnesses, including Cozzi's husband and colleagues, testified about the events leading up to his death and provided character testimony about the victim. Kosowski, who represented himself in court, declined to give an opening statement.

The prosecution submitted that Kosowski planned for several months to conceive and execute the plot to murder Cozzi, including preparation of items and weapons, and online searches to research of Cozzi. At one point, the duffel bag containing the tools used for the murder, which the prosecution described as the "murder bag", was presented before the judge. The prosecution concluded their case after six days. Kosowski declined to present evidence in his defense, and while the prosecution was still presenting their case, Kosowski cross-examined some of the state's witnesses and attempted to dispute some of their testimony. He also requested two demonstrations in court to prove whether he could carry the body with a cart or fit a human body into a trash bag, but the judge denied his requests.

During closing arguments, the prosecution argued that Kosowski murdered Cozzi because of their long-running legal dispute. They relied on surveillance footage, Cozzi’s blood found in Kosowski’s vehicles, evidence of him monitoring Cozzi, and a bag containing items they said were intended for the crime. They argued he killed Cozzi in the law-office bathroom and disposed of his body. Kosowski argued that prosecutors had not proved first-degree murder beyond a reasonable doubt. He highlighted the absence of Cozzi’s body and death certificate and challenged the timeline and physical feasibility of the prosecution’s account, arguing that the alleged murder and disposal could not have happened as described.

On September 23, 2026, Judge Joseph Bulone found Kosowski guilty of first-degree murder. A Spencer hearing was scheduled on October 8, 2026, for the judge to review the case before he decided on the sentence for Kosowski, who faced the death penalty or life without parole. Kosowski expressed that he did not wish to make submissions before his sentencing, and the prosecution was set to pursue the death penalty.

On October 8, 2026, the prosecution made their final submissions. Kosowski declined to make any final arguments, although John Nohlgren, a judge-appointed special counsel, presented his research on Kosowski and the relevant mitigating factors. Kosowski's sentencing hearing was set on November 20, 2026.

On November 20, 2026, Kosowski was sentenced to death for Cozzi's murder. In his sentencing verdict, Judge Bulone stated that even though there were several mitigating factors in the case, the aggravating circumstances had outweighed them and Cozzi's murder was committed in a "cold, calculating and premeditated manner, without any pretense of moral or legal justification". The judge remarked that due to the heinous nature of the offense, Kosowski had effectively "forfeited his right to live", and therefore sentenced Kosowski to death.

== See also ==
- Capital punishment in Florida
- List of death row inmates in the United States § Florida
- List of murder convictions without a body
