= John Hammond (weather forecaster) =

British meteorologist

- Born: John Michael Hammond; 9 April 1966 (age 60); Bosham, West Sussex, England
- Education: University of Birmingham; University of Salford
- Occupation: Meteorologist
- Years active: 1989–present

John Michael Hammond (born 9 April 1966) is a meteorologist and an English weather forecaster, newsreader and continuity announcer for the BBC. In the past he could be seen presenting weather forecasts on BBC One news bulletins, the BBC News Channel, BBC Red Button and BBC World News. He is currently presenting for the BBC in Birmingham, including the regional news programme Midlands Today. He is a newsreader and continuity announcer for BBC Radio 4.

== Early life and education ==
Hammond was born in Bosham, West Sussex, the grandson of a farmer.

His grandfather was George Drinkald Hammond. His parents were David Hammond and Jane Ingles. His parents met at Bognor Teachers Training College, and married on 4 April 1961 at a Methodist church in south Worcestershire.

His father was from Wisborough Green in West Sussex. Both of his parents were teachers. Bognor Teachers College became the West Sussex Institute of Higher Education in 1977, and since 2005 has been a main site of the University of Chichester.

He attended Chipping Campden School, in north-west rural Gloucestershire, from 1978 to 1984. After taking an interest in the weather from the age of four, he studied geography at the University of Salford, followed by meteorology at the University of Birmingham.

== Career ==
After a brief spell at the Met Office headquarters in Bracknell, Berkshire, Hammond started forecasting in February 1991, working at regional weather centres in Nottingham, Bristol and Plymouth. This involved a variety of forecasting work for aviation, local industry, and some local radio too. He spent around seven years presenting the weather at ITV until joining the BBC Weather Centre in the spring of 2003.

He also appeared on the BBC quiz show Celebrity Mastermind in 2012.

He left the BBC at the end of March 2017 and now runs Weather Trending with Sara Thornton

Hammond is a massive fan of English rock band Status Quo and he went on stage with the band playing with his guitar and went on the Ark Royal to watch the band play live on stage to promote their album Heavy Traffic.

Hammond joined BBC Radio 4 in March 2019 as a continuity announcer, and later also became a newsreader on the station.
