= Chipping Campden School =

Academy in Gloucestershire, England

Location
- Cidermill Lane; Chipping Campden, Gloucestershire, GL55 6HU; United Kingdom
- 52.053854°N 1.776329°W

Information
- Type: Academy
- Motto: Inspire. Empower. Excel
- Established: c. 1440; 586 years ago
- Founder: John Fereby, Baptist Hicks, George Townsend
- Department for Education URN: 136960 Tables
- Ofsted: Reports
- Chairman of Governors: Andrew Sunderland
- Principal: Gareth Burton
- Gender: Mixed
- Age: 11 to 18
- Enrolment: 1470
- Houses: Fereby; Hicks; Townsend
- Colours: Gold, blue
- Publication: The Campdonian
- Website: https://campden.school

Chipping Campden School is a non-selective secondary school and sixth form with academy status located in Chipping Campden, in the English county of Gloucestershire. Founded in c. 1440 the school celebrated its 575th birthday in 2015, making its charter one of the oldest in England.

The school was founded with money left by John Fereby and his wife, a wealthy wool merchant, for the education of the poor boys of the town. Further investments were provided by Baptist Hicks, 1st Viscount Campden and later the Earl of Gainsborough in the 17th century and John Townsend. The school now uses these founders as its house names.

The original school buildings were situated in the High Street in Chipping Campden offering boarding for boys and later girls in other local buildings.

The school came to be a grammar school until 1965 when it merged with Moreton Secondary Modern School to become a comprehensive. The school buildings were substantially enlarged in 1964 to house the incoming students from Moreton.

== Headmasters of Chipping Campden Grammar School (up to 1964) ==
- 1547 Sir Robert Glaseman
- 1627 Rev Ambrose Jenks
- 1632 Rev Broadway
- 1635 Rev Samuel Edwards
- 1647 Rev Butler
- 1648 Rev Mason MA
- 1664 Rev Kirkham
- 1669 Rev Taylor
- 1686 Rev Morse
- 1700 Rev Smith
- 1717 Rev R Goodhall
- 1741 Rev Lumbert
- 1766 Rev W Boyce
- 1772 Rev T Symonds
- 1797 Rev J Worgan
- 1822 Rev R O Wilson
- 1832 Rev J Harling
- 1835 Rev T F Layng
- 1837 Rev H Miniken
- 1840- Rev Barton
- 1855 Rev G B Dodwell
- 1862 Rev Dr S F Hiron
- 1871 Rev J Foster
- 1889 Mr F B Osborne
- 1913 Mr W M Cox MA
- 1927 Mr W J Bright MA
- 1951 Mr A L Jones MC MA

== Headteachers of Chipping Campden School ==
- 1965 Mr A L Jones
- 1976 Mr P T Sandry
- 1994 Mr J Price BA
- 2007 Ms A France

== Principals of Chipping Campden School ==
- 2011 Ms A France
- 2012 Mr J Sanderson
- 2023 Mr G M Burton

== Alumni ==
- John Hammond (weather forecaster) (1978–84), grew up on the Worcestershire boundary

== See also ==
- List of the oldest schools in the United Kingdom
