= Pleasant Valley State Prison =

State prison in California, US

Pleasant Valley State Prison (PVSP)
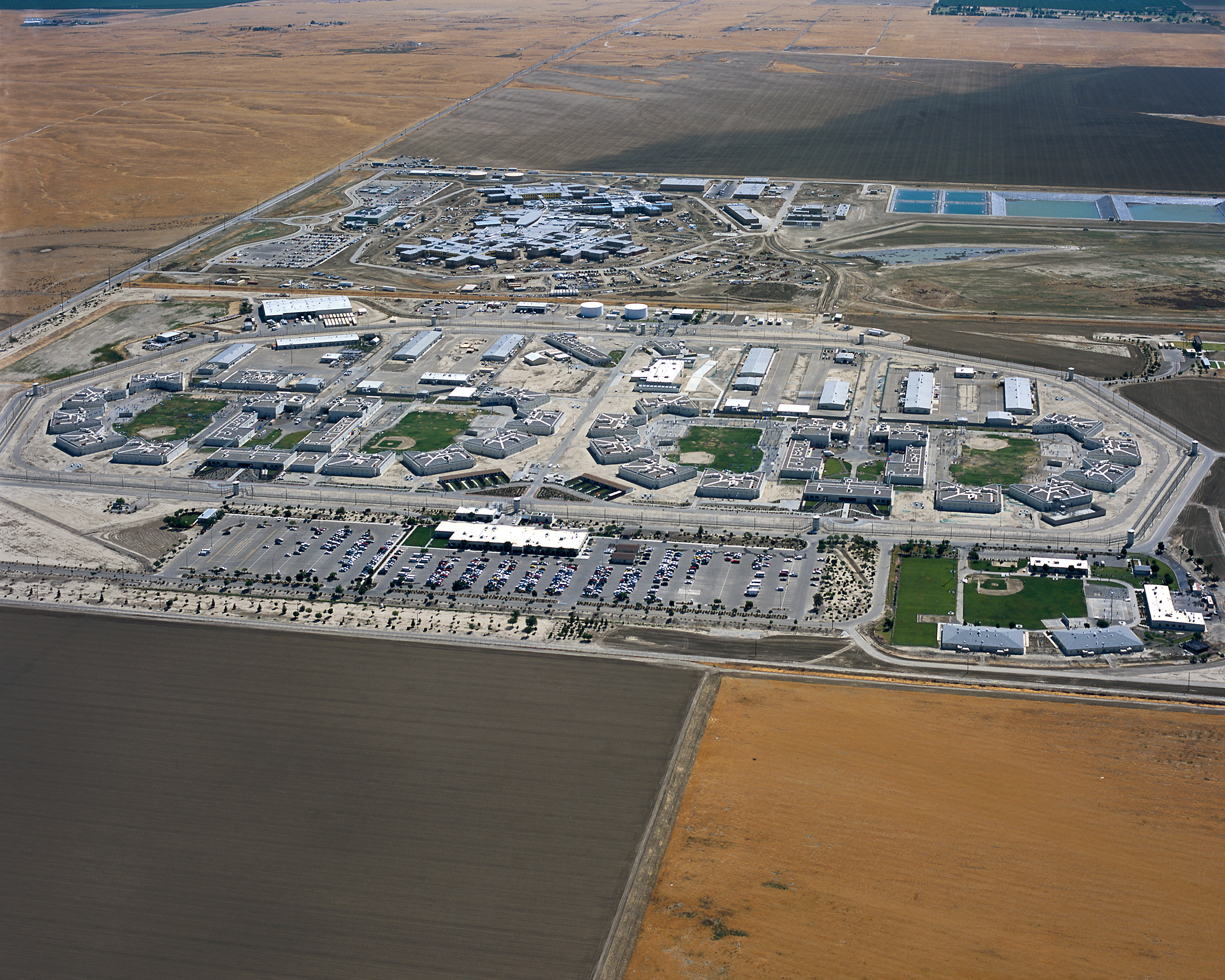
- Interactive map of Pleasant Valley State Prison (PVSP)
- Location: Coalinga, California; 36.1316°N 120.2490°W
- Status: Operational
- Security class: Minimum to maximum
- Capacity: 2,308
- Population: 2,562 (111.0% capacity) (January 31, 2023)
- Opened: November 1994
- Managed by: California Department of Corrections and Rehabilitation
- Warden: Jerry Ourique

Pleasant Valley State Prison (PVSP) is a 640-acre (260 ha) minimum-to-maximum security state prison in Coalinga, Fresno County, California. The facility has housed convicted murderers Sirhan Sirhan, Erik Menendez, X-Raided, Paul Flores and Hans Reiser, among others.

== History ==
Location of Coalinga in Fresno County, and location of Fresno County in California

The prison opened in November 1994. On July 17, 2000, PVSP activated two substance abuse programs involving community services for inmates who have a history of substance abuse. PVSP converted one of its general population yards into a sensitive needs yard (SNY) in November 2002, and now houses approximately 900 SNY inmates on D Facility. Then in May 2004 converted A Facility to a sensitive needs yard and houses 1000 inmates on A Facility.

As of July 31, 2022, PVSP was incarcerating people at 116.4% of its design capacity, with 2,688.

In 2005–2006, PVSP and Avenal State Prison (ASP) were particularly affected by Valley fever, with 150 new cases from PVSP and 30 from ASP in 2005 and 514 at PVSP and 91 at ASP in 2006. In 2007 Valley fever had killed at least four PVSP inmates and one staff member over the previous two years.

== Programs ==
- Prison Industry Authority (PIA): None
- Vocational: Air conditioning and refrigeration, auto body, auto detail, auto mechanics, auto paint, building maintenance, carpentry, computer repair, consumer electronics, dry cleaning, drywall, electrical work, janitorial, landscape and gardening, machine shop, masonry, mill and cabinetry, office services, small engine repair, plumbing, welding.
- Academic: Adult Basic Education, High School/GED, Pre-Release, English as a Second Language, Literacy Program.
- Other: Community Service Crews, Religious, Arts-in-Corrections, Computers for Schools.

== Notable current and former inmates ==
- Paul Flores, convicted for the 1996 murder of Cal-Poly student Kristin Smart.
- Anerae Brown aka X-Raided, convicted for the murder of a woman during a home invasion robbery. He was released on September 14, 2018 on parole.
- Hans Reiser, creator of ReiserFS, was convicted with the 2006 murder of his estranged wife Nina Reiser. He was initially serving his sentence in San Quentin State Prison, then was transferred to Pleasant Valley State Prison in 2011.
- Jesse Rugge, convicted of aggravated kidnapping. Notorious for his association with Jesse James Hollywood and his involvement in the kidnapping/murder of Nick Markowitz. Released in October, 2013.
- Lyle and Erik Menendez, brothers convicted of murdering their parents.
- Sirhan Sirhan, convicted of the June 5, 1968 assassination of presidential candidate Robert F. Kennedy.
- Flesh-N-Bone (born Stanley Howse), a member of the multi-platinum rap group Bone Thugs-N-Harmony. Howse was convicted on charges of assault with a deadly weapon and probation violation on September 22, 2000. He was released in July 2008.
- Roger Kibbe, known as the "I-5 Strangler" for killing 8 people on freeways around Sacramento, California.
- Steven "Boston" Colver, convicted in 2011 for the 2009 murder of his girlfriend's mother, Joanne Witt.
- Ryan Scott Blinston, a spree killer who murdered three people in 2020, was imprisoned at Pleasant Valley State Prison for burglary and car theft in 2013 but is currently imprisoned at Pleasant Valley again.
- Jason Budrow, murdered Roger Kibbe when they were cellmates and also stabbed Paul Flores.
- Mark Hatten (1967 - 2020) aka Mark "Hollywood" Hatten: Convicted in 2003 of making criminal threats against model Anna Nicole Smith, assault and battery against her neighbor Rene Navarro of North Hollywood, California. The jury convicted Mark Richmond Hatten of two felony counts; assault by means likely to produce great bodily injury and battery. Mark "Hollywood" Hatten spent six years in prison.

== See also ==
- List of California state prisons
