= Murder of Kristin Smart =

1996 murder in California, United States

Kristin Smart
- Smart in March 1995
- Born: Kristin Denise Smart; February 20, 1977; Augsburg, Bavaria, West Germany
- Disappeared: May 25, 1996 (aged 19); San Luis Obispo, California, U.S.
- Status: Declared dead in absentia on May 25, 2002 (aged 25)
- Height: 6 ft 1 in (1.85 m)
- Parents: Stan Smart (father); Denise Smart (mother)

Kristin Denise Smart (February 20, 1977 – disappeared May 25, 1996; declared legally dead May 25, 2002) was a 19-year-old American woman murdered by Paul Flores at the end of her first year on the campus of California Polytechnic State University, San Luis Obispo (Cal Poly San Luis Obispo).

On the evening of Friday, May 24, 1996, Smart attended a fellow Cal Poly student's off-campus party. At approximately 2 a.m., she was found passed out on a neighbor's lawn, and two students began to help her walk to her dorm room. A third student, Paul Flores, joined the group and, due to the proximity of his dorm to Smart's, told the other two students that he would, "get Kristin home safely". Smart was never seen again, and searches conducted since her disappearance have not yet located her, or her remains.

Smart's disappearance resulted in state legislation, including the Kristin Smart Campus Security Act, a bill which requires all public colleges and publicly funded educational institutions in California to have their security services make agreements with local police departments about reporting cases involving or possibly involving violence against students, including missing students. The bill was passed unanimously by the California State Legislature and was signed into law by Governor Pete Wilson.

On April 13, 2021, Flores and his father, Ruben Flores, were arrested and taken into custody on suspicion of Smart's disappearance. Their homes were searched, and investigators found numerous "items of interest" in the son's home. Their trial began in July 2022. On October 18, 2022, Paul Flores was found guilty of the murder of Kristin Smart, and Ruben Flores was acquitted of accessory after the fact. On March 10, 2023, Paul was sentenced to 25 years to life in prison. The trial was held in Monterey County Superior Court in Salinas, California.

== Background ==
Kristin Denise Smart was born February 20, 1977, in Augsburg, Bavaria, West Germany, to Stan and Denise Smart, both teachers of children of American military personnel. She had one brother and one sister. When she was a child, Smart moved with her family to Stockton, California. She attended and graduated from Stockton's Lincoln High School in 1995. Before her disappearance, she worked as a lifeguard and camp counselor at Camp Mokuleia in Hawaii.

== Disappearance ==
Smart enrolled at California Polytechnic State University, San Luis Obispo (Cal Poly) in San Luis Obispo, California, in 1995. On the night of May 24, 1996, which fell on Memorial Day weekend, she attended a birthday party where she did not know anyone at a fraternity house. She walked to and attended the party alone as a friend of hers had decided to return to the dorms earlier that night.

At approximately 2 a.m. on Saturday, May 25, 1996, Smart was found passed out on a neighbor's lawn by two fellow students, Cheryl Anderson and Tim Davis, who both had just left the party. They helped Smart to her feet and decided to walk her back to her nearby dormitory. Another student from the party, Paul Flores, joined their group and offered to help the two return Smart to her dorm room.

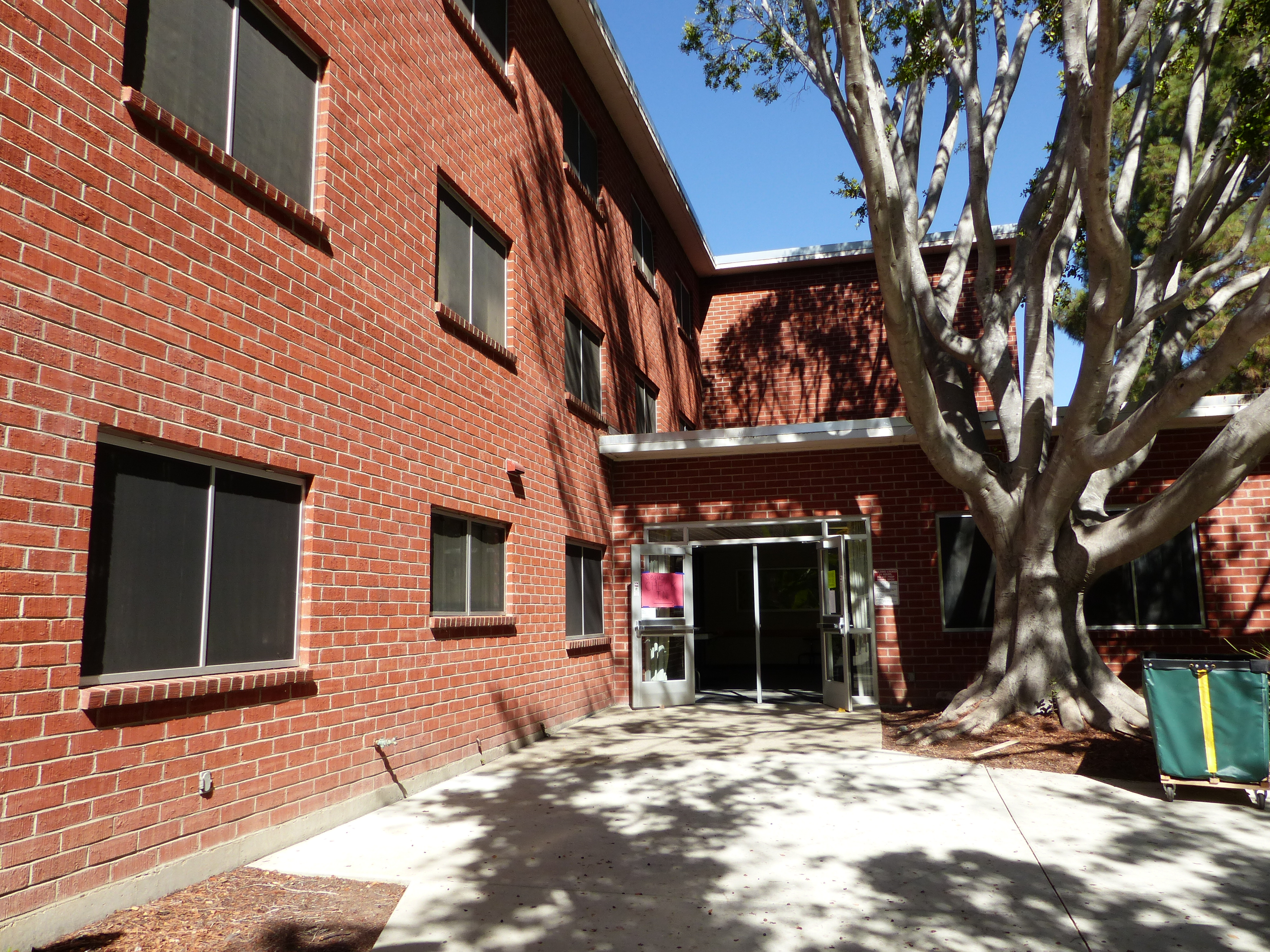
The entrance to one of Cal Poly's "red brick" residence halls.

Davis departed the group first since he lived off-campus and had driven to the party. Anderson was the second to depart the group, heading to Sierra Madre Hall, after Flores, who lived closer to Smart's dorm, assured Anderson that he could walk her there. Flores stated to police that he walked Smart as far as his dormitory, Santa Lucia Hall, and then allowed her to walk back to her red brick dormitory, Muir Hall, by herself. This testimony from Flores was the last known sighting of her. Smart did not have any money or credit cards at the time she went missing.

== Official investigation ==
The University Police Department originally suspected that Smart had gone on an unannounced vacation and chose to delay reporting her as a missing person to local law enforcement. She was only reported missing after a week, despite her family calling the police earlier.

Several volunteers searched for Smart. Some of them were on horseback while others used ground-penetrating radar devices.

During the Laci Peterson murder investigation, there were unfounded rumors in the media that Laci's husband Scott Peterson had something to do with Smart's disappearance due to their simultaneous attendance at the Cal Poly campus. There was a brief initial inquiry into whether Peterson was tied to the disappearance, with Peterson denying any involvement, and he was eventually ruled out as a suspect by police.

Although her body was never discovered, an earring that might have belonged to Smart was found by a tenant at the former residence of Paul Flores's mother. This earring was not marked as evidence and has since been lost by the police. Between 1996 and 2007, various searches for her remains and other evidence were conducted, some using cadaver dogs trained to detect the scent of human remains, including searches of properties owned by the Flores family. No useful leads were found for nearly two decades.

On September 6, 2016, officials from the San Luis Obispo County Sheriff's Office announced they were investigating a new lead in the case. Cadaver dogs from the FBI were brought in and investigators were preparing to spend approximately four days excavating an area on the Cal Poly campus. After three days, items were found at all three dig sites located on the same hillside near Smart's dorm. A spokesman for the sheriff's office said, "The items are being analyzed to see whether they are connected to the case, which could take days, weeks, or months". The items recovered were still being investigated as of 2020.

On April 20, 2021, prosecutors announced ground-penetrating radar and cadaver dogs found biological evidence indicating Smart's body was once buried beneath the deck of Ruben Flores's home, and had been subsequently exhumed and hidden.

On May 6, 2026, the San Luis Obispo County Sheriff's Office served a search warrant at Susan Flores' home in Arroyo Grande, where ground-penetrating radar equipment was used and soil samples were taken. Two days later, on May 8, San Luis Obispo County Sheriff Ian Parkinson said soil tests showed human remains may have been or may still be on the property. The search ended on May 10 with the sheriff's office confirming that they did not recover Smart's remains but that detectives would continue evaluating evidence found at the location.

== Legal proceedings ==
Paul Flores was convicted of Smart's murder in 2022.

Smart was declared legally dead on May 25, 2002, the sixth anniversary of her disappearance. In 2005, her parents, Denise and Stan Smart, filed a civil case of wrongful death against Flores, one of the three students who walked Smart to her dorm. The Smart family was represented by James R. Murphy, on a pro bono basis. The suit was dropped due to lack of evidence after Flores pleaded the Fifth Amendment. In 2006 or 2007, the Flores family filed a lawsuit against the Smart family for emotional distress, but the lawsuit never resulted in a judgment.

The San Luis Obispo County Sheriff's Office regularly reviewed the case, and spent thousands of hours and dollars during the period 2011–2016. The FBI had her on file as a high priority missing person investigation, with a reward of $75,000 for information leading to finding her or resolving her case. Terry Black, who lived in the Sacramento–San Joaquin River Delta area, offered a $100,000 reward for Smart's body.

=== Publicity ===
Beginning on September 30, 2019, podcaster Chris Lambert released a series of podcast episodes about the case. The podcast was downloaded over thirty million times. Renewed public interest led to a new billboard being put up in Arroyo Grande in January 2020 to replace the original, which had been up since 1997, as well as uncovering several new witnesses.

On January 18, 2020, the Stockton Record reported that the FBI informed Smart's family that additional news about her disappearance would be coming and that the family "might want to get away for a while" but did not provide any specific information. However, on January 22, 2020, The Record issued a correction: the FBI did not contact the Smart family; rather, a retired FBI agent who had been in contact with the family for years was the source of the advice. On January 29, 2020, the San Luis Obispo police department confirmed that two trucks owned by Flores had been taken in as evidence. On February 5, 2020, search warrants were served for "specific items of evidence" at four different locations – two in San Luis Obispo, one in Washington state, and at a home in Los Angeles County. Flores was briefly detained during the search.

=== Date rape drug ===
On April 22, 2020, the Los Angeles Times reported that a search warrant was served at the home of Paul Flores in San Pedro, California. The Los Angeles County Sheriff's Department assisted detectives from San Luis Obispo County Sheriff Department in the search. It was reported that numerous "items of interest" were successfully found during the search. Among the items found in the search were date rape drugs and homemade videos showing Flores in acts of sodomizing and raping young women.

On February 11, 2021, KSBY reported that Paul Flores had been arrested by the Los Angeles Police Department in Rancho Palos Verdes, California, on suspicion of being a felon in possession of a firearm, which is a felony. On March 15, 2021, a search warrant was issued to search Ruben Flores's home, including the use of cadaver dogs and ground-penetrating radar. A 1985 Volkswagen Cabriolet was towed from the home of Ruben Flores after cadaver dogs searched the vehicle.

=== Arrest ===
On April 13, 2021, Paul Flores and his father, Ruben Flores, were taken into custody by the San Luis Obispo County Sheriff's Department in relation to the case. Paul Flores was charged with murder; Ruben Flores was charged with being an accessory. Investigations later concluded that Paul Flores attempted to rape Smart, although Dan Dow, District Attorney of the County of San Luis Obispo, has stated that the statute of limitations has expired on a sexual assault charge, but murder committed in the course of rape or attempted rape justified first-degree felony murder charges. In September 2021 a judge ruled that there was sufficient evidence of guilt for the case to proceed to trial.

The trial was set to begin on April 25, 2022, but was delayed, as the defense was granted a change of venue motion. The case was moved to Monterey County, where it was heard by Judge Jennifer O'Keefe. The trial began on June 6, 2022, with pretrial motions. Over 1,500 jury summonses were sent to County residents.

=== Verdict and appeals ===
On October 18, 2022, the separate juries that were hearing the cases simultaneously at the Monterey County Courthouse found Paul Flores guilty of first-degree murder, and his father Ruben Flores not guilty of accessory after the fact. Ruben Flores was facing a maximum sentence of three years in jail. One juror on the Ruben Flores case told Judge O'Keefe that he had discussed this case with his priest for "spiritual guidance" as it "was causing him stress". That juror was dismissed and an alternate was sworn in, causing deliberations to begin again. Paul Flores was sentenced to 25 years to life on March 10, 2023.

Paul Flores is currently serving his term at the California State Prison, Corcoran, after being attacked twice with improvised weapons by inmates at Pleasant Valley State Prison. He appealed his conviction, claiming an unfair trial. An unpublished decision was filed on October 24, 2025, affirming the conviction. His petition for a hearing by the California Supreme Court was denied on January 11, 2026. Barring federal relief, by way of a presidential pardon, he will not become eligible for parole until at least 2047.

== Legacy ==
Smart's disappearance and slow response by the campus police resulted in the Kristin Smart Campus Security Act being written and sponsored by State Senator Mike Thompson, passed 61–0 by the California State Legislature, and signed into effect by then-Governor Pete Wilson on August 19, 1998. The law took effect on January 1, 1999, and requires all public colleges and publicly funded educational institutions to have their security services make agreements with local police departments about reporting cases involving or possibly involving violence against students, including missing students.

== See also ==
- Disappearance of Lauren Spierer
- Disappearance of Tara Grinstead
- Disappeared (TV series)
- Murder of Holly Bobo
- List of kidnappings
- List of solved missing person cases: 1950–1999

== General sources ==
- Mitchell, Corey (2003). Dead and Buried: A Shocking Account of Rape, Torture, and Murder on the California Coast. New York: Pinnacle Books. ISBN 978-0-786-01517-7.
