= Linda Stratmann =

British writer

- Born: 1948 (age 77–78); Leicester, England
- Occupation: Author
- Writing career
- Genres: Historical fiction, crime fiction, historical mystery fiction
- Subjects: History, true crime, non-fiction, biography

Linda Stratmann (born 1948 in Leicester, UK) is a British writer of historical true crime, biography and crime fiction.

== Early life ==
She was born in the City of Leicester in a family which belonged to the Orthodox Jewish community. Her parents were engaged in the tailoring trade. Her grandparents had immigrated from Poland in early 1920s and her parents were born in London but during World War II they moved to Leicester. Stratmann attended Wyggeston Girls Grammar School. She graduated from Newcastle University with a degree in psychology in 1974. After graduating she joined the Civil service and trained to be an Inspector of Taxes. She moved to London in 1987 and left the Civil Service in 2001. In 2002 she published her first book, on the history of chloroform.

== Work ==
Linda is the author of a crime fiction series based in Bayswater in the 1880s and featuring a lady sleuth, Frances Doughty. They are published by the Mystery Press, the fiction imprint of the History Press. The books in this series are:

- The Poisonous Seed (2011)
- The Daughters of Gentlemen (2012)
- A Case of Doubtful Death (2013)
- An Appetite for Murder (2014)
- The Children of Silence (2015)
- Death in Bayswater (2016)
- A True and Faithful Brother (2017)
- Murder at the Bayswater Bicycle Club (2018)

A new series starting with Mr Scarletti's Ghost, published in 2015, is set in Brighton in the 1870s and explores the world of Victorian spirit mediums. The second book, The Royal Ghost followed, and a third, An Unquiet Ghost, was published in 2018.

Since 2021, Stratmann has penned a series of Sherlock Holmes novels, following the detective's early career prior to his meeting Dr. Watson. Instead, Holmes is assisted by Stamford, originally a minor character in the first novel A Study in Scarlet.

The Secret Poisoner, a history of criminal poisoning in the nineteenth century, was published by Yale University Press in 2016.

She has appeared in the Channel 5 television documentary, Scream, about the history of anaesthesia, Hypnosurgery Live on Channel 4, Medical Mavericks on BBC Four by Michael Mosley and an episode of "Fred Dinenage: Murder Casebook".

== Personal life ==
Stratmann has had a lifelong interest in true crime. She is a trained chemists' dispenser, has a Bachelor of Science with first class honours in psychology, and is a black belt in aikido since 2000. She lives in London with her second husband.

Stratmann suffers from both hyperacusis and tinnitus.

== Selected books ==
=== Fiction ===
The Frances Doughty Mysteries

1. The Poisonous Seed (2011). Publisher: The History Press.
2. The Daughters of Gentlemen (2012). Publisher: The History Press.
3. A Case of Doubtful Death (2013). The History Press (1 April 2013)
4. An Appetite for Murder (2014). The History Press
5. The Children of Silence (2015). The History Press
6. Death in Bayswater (2016). The History Press
7. A True and Faithful Brother (2017). The Mystery Press (1 March 2017).
8. Murder at the Bayswater Bicycle Club (2018). The History Press (1 March 2018).

The Mina Scarletti Mysteries

1. Mr Scarletti's Ghost (2015). Publisher: The History Press.
2. The Royal Ghost (2015). Publisher: The History Press.
3. An Unquiet Ghost (2018). Publisher: Sapere Books.
4. The Ghost of Hollow House (2019). Publisher: Sapere Books.
5. His Father's Ghost (2020). Publisher: Sapere Books.
6. The Cyanide Ghost (2021). Publisher: Sapere Books.

The Early Casebook of Sherlock Holmes

1. Sherlock Holmes and the Rosetta Stone Mystery (2021). Sapere Books (October 2021).
2. Sherlock Holmes and the Explorers Club (2022). Sapere Books (January 2022).
3. Sherlock Holmes and the Ebony Idol (2022). Sapere Books (September 2022).
4. Sherlock Holmes and the Persian Slipper (2023). Sapere Books (January 2023).
5. Sherlock Holmes and the Legend of the Great Auk (2023). Sapere Books (June 2022).
6. Sherlock Holmes and the Duelling Dukes (2024). Sapere Books (January 2024).
7. Sherlock Holmes and the Mycroft Incident (2024). Sapere Books (May 2024).
8. Sherlock Holmes and the Cabinet of Wonders (2024). Sapere Books (November 2024).
9. Sherlock Holmes and the Power Principle (2025). Sapere Books (August 2025).
10. Sherlock Holmes and the Widow's Key (2026). Sapere Books (January 2026).
11. Sherlock Holmes and the Aeronauts (2026). Sapere Books (June 2026).

Other

- Kent Murders (Sutton True Crime History) (2009). The History Press (1 January 2009).
- Middlesex Murder (2012). The History Press (29 February 2012).
- Essex Murders (Sutton True Crime History) (2012). The History Press; UK ed. edition (29 February 2012).
- Greater London Murders: 33 Stories of Revenge, Jealousy, Greed & Lust (Sutton True Crime History) (2012).The History Press (29 February 2012)

=== Non-fiction ===
- Chloroform: the Quest for Oblivion, (2003, Sutton Publishing). A history of the discovery, use and misuse of chloroform.
- Essex Murders (2004, Sutton Publishing)
- Whiteley’s Folly (2004, Sutton Publishing). The story of William Whiteley, the founder of the Bayswater store, and his murder in 1907
- Gloucestershire Murders (2005, Sutton Publishing)
- The Crooks Who Conned Millions (2006 Sutton Publishing) Ten stories of nineteenth century frauds.
- Notorious Blasted Rascal: Colonel Charteris and the Servant Girl's Revenge The story of Francis Charteris, the most hated man in Britain, and his trial for rape in 1730. (2008 The History Press)
- Kent Murders (2009 The History Press)
- Greater London Murders (2010 The History Press)
- Middlesex Murders (2010 The History Press)
- Fraudsters and Charlatans is the paperback version of Crooks Who Conned Millions (2010 The History Press)
- Cruel Deeds and Dreadful Calamities: the Illustrated Police News 1864-1938 an illustrated history of the notorious newspaper, (British Library, March 2011)
- More Essex Murders (2011 The History Press)
