= Chipping Campden =

Town in Gloucestershire, England

Coordinates: 52.052°N 1.779°W

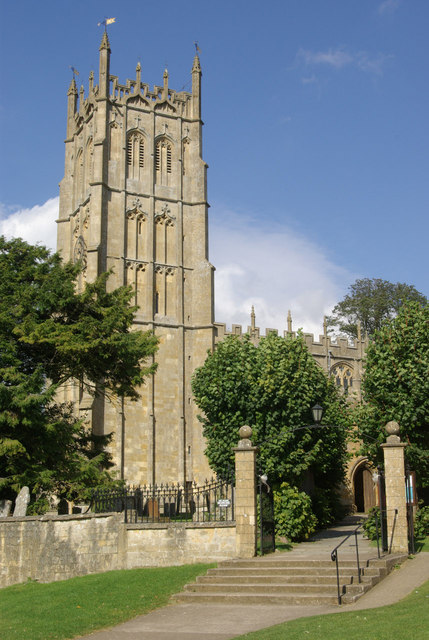
- St James' church

- Location within Gloucestershire
- Population: 2,288 (2011 Census)
- OS grid reference: SP155395
- Civil parish: Chipping Campden Town Council
- District: Cotswold
- Shire county: Gloucestershire
- Region: South West
- Country: England
- Sovereign state: United Kingdom
- Post town: CHIPPING CAMPDEN
- Postcode district: GL55
- Police: Gloucestershire
- Fire: Gloucestershire
- Ambulance: South Western
- UK Parliament: North Cotswolds

Chipping Campden is a market town in the Cotswold district of Gloucestershire, England. It is notable for its terraced High Street, dating from the 14th to the 17th centuries.

A wool trading centre in the Middle Ages, Chipping Campden enjoyed the patronage of wealthy wool merchants, most notably William Greville (d.1401). The High Street is lined with buildings built from locally quarried oolitic limestone, known as Cotswold stone, and boasts a wealth of vernacular architecture. Much of the town centre is a conservation area which has helped to preserve the original buildings. The town is an end point of the Cotswold Way, a 102-mile long-distance footpath. Chipping Campden has hosted its own Cotswold Games since 1612.

== History ==
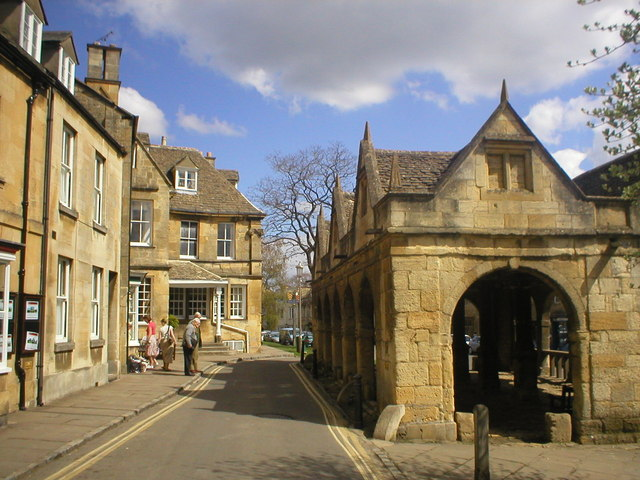
Chipping Campden Market Hall

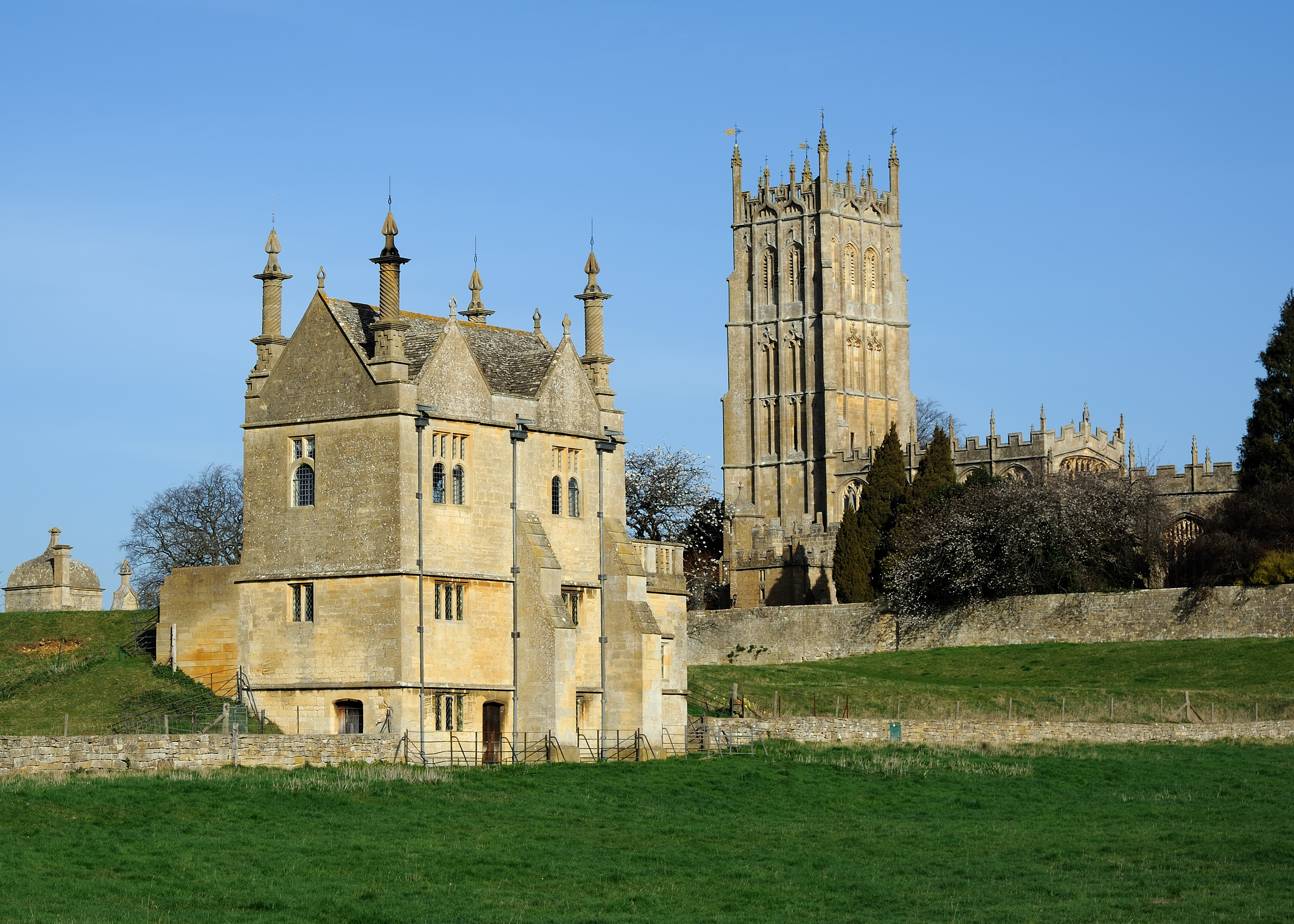
East Banqueting House and St James, Chipping Campden

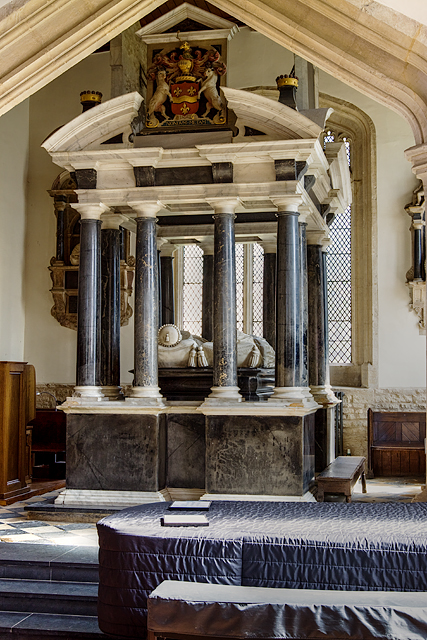
St James' church, Hicks Memorial

The name Chipping derives from Old English cēping, meaning 'market' or 'market-place'; the same element is found in other towns such as Chipping Norton, Chipping Sodbury and Chipping (now High) Wycombe.

One of the oldest buildings in the town is the Grade I listed Market Hall, built by Sir Baptist Hicks in 1627 and is still in use. The building was intended as a shelter for merchants and farmers selling their wares, with the arched side walls open to allow light and customers to enter. There was a plan to sell the hall in the 1940s, but locals raised funds to purchase the property and donated it to the National Trust.

The grand early perpendicular Cotswold wool church, Church of St James, with its medieval altar frontals (c. 1500), cope (c. 1400) and 17th century monuments, includes a monument to silk merchant Sir Baptist Hicks and his family. The Grade I listed church also includes a plaque to William Grevel, described as "the flower of the wool merchants of all England". His home, the Grade I listed Grevel's House, was built c. 1380; it is not open to visitors.

The Grade I listed almshouses on Church Street were built in 1612, provided by Sir Baptist Hicks as homes for 12 pensioners and still remains in use for that purpose. The Grade II listed Old Silk Mill in Sheep Street is a three-storey building, originally used as a mill for spinning of silk thread; it closed in 1860 and became a silk throwing mill. In 1902, the building was converted into the headquarters for the Guild of Handicraft. The Court Barn near the church is now a museum celebrating the Arts and Crafts tradition of the area.

Hicks was also the owner of Campden House, on land he purchased some time after 1608; he added the manor and gained the title 1st Viscount Campden. The manor was destroyed by Royalists in 1645 during the English Civil War, possibly to prevent it falling into the hands of the Parliamentarians. There is little reliable evidence as to the appearance of the manor and gardens. Any drawings of the house were made long after it had been destroyed. All that now remains of Sir Baptist Hicks' once imposing estate are a gatehouse and two Jacobean banqueting houses; the latter were restored by the Landmark Trust.

Lady Juliana Noel, Sir Baptist's daughter, and her family lived at the converted stables near the site in Calf Lane, now called The Court House. Her descendant still lives in that Grade II listed building.

In 1970, the High Street and much of the town centre was designated a conservation area to preserve the architecture.

There are two historic gardens nearby: the Arts and Crafts Hidcote Manor Garden, owned and managed by the National Trust, and another at nearby Mickleton, Kiftsgate; this site is privately owned, but open to the public. Two miles to the west, in the grounds of Weston Park near Saintbury, are the earthwork remains of a motte-and-bailey castle.

== Governance ==
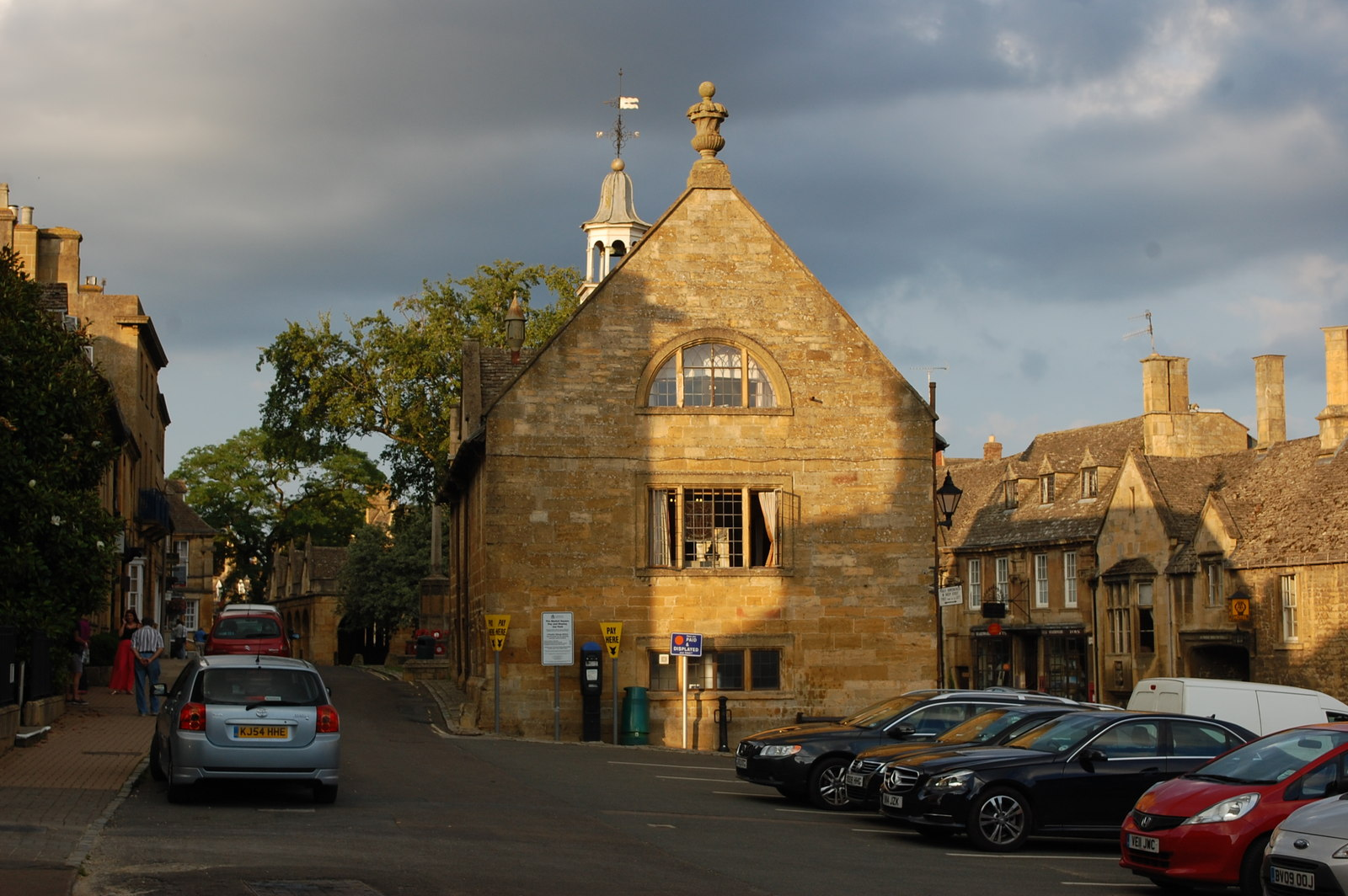
Chipping Campden Town Hall

The town falls within Campden-Vale electoral ward. This ward stretches north from Chipping Campden to Mickleton. Its population, taken at the 2011 census, was 5,888. Local government consists of a town council of 11 councillors; one councillor is selected to serve as mayor for a term of 12 months.

Chipping Campden Council meets on the second Tuesday of every month in Chipping Campden Town Hall. Council meetings are open to the public, with time set aside for public questions.

== Schools ==
There are two primary schools: St James’ & Ebrington Church of England and St Catharine's Catholic; the town also has a secondary school, Chipping Campden School.

== Transport ==
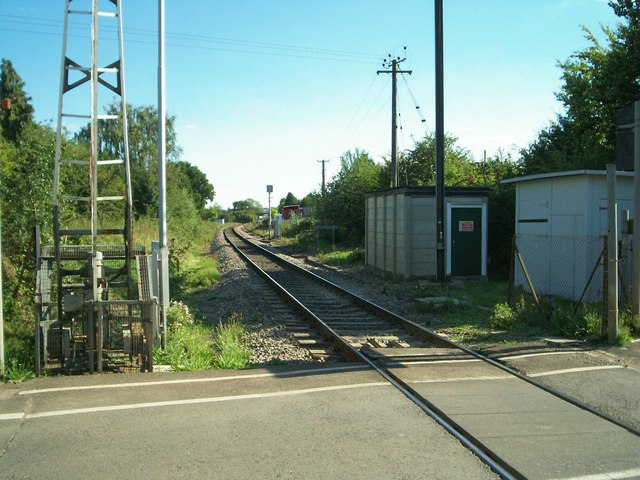
Former site of the Chipping Campden station

Chipping Campden railway station was a stop on the Cotswold Line, but was closed in 1966. Since 2014, there have been proposals to reopen it.

The nearest National Rail station is at Moreton-in-Marsh, eight miles away. Great Western Railway operates generally hourly services between London Paddington and Worcestershire Parkway, via Reading, Oxford and Evesham.

Local bus routes are operated by Stagecoach Midlands, Pulham Coaches and Hedgehog Community Buses; these connect the town with Cheltenham, Evesham, Mickleton, Moreton-in-Marsh and Stratford-upon-Avon.

== Cotswold Games ==
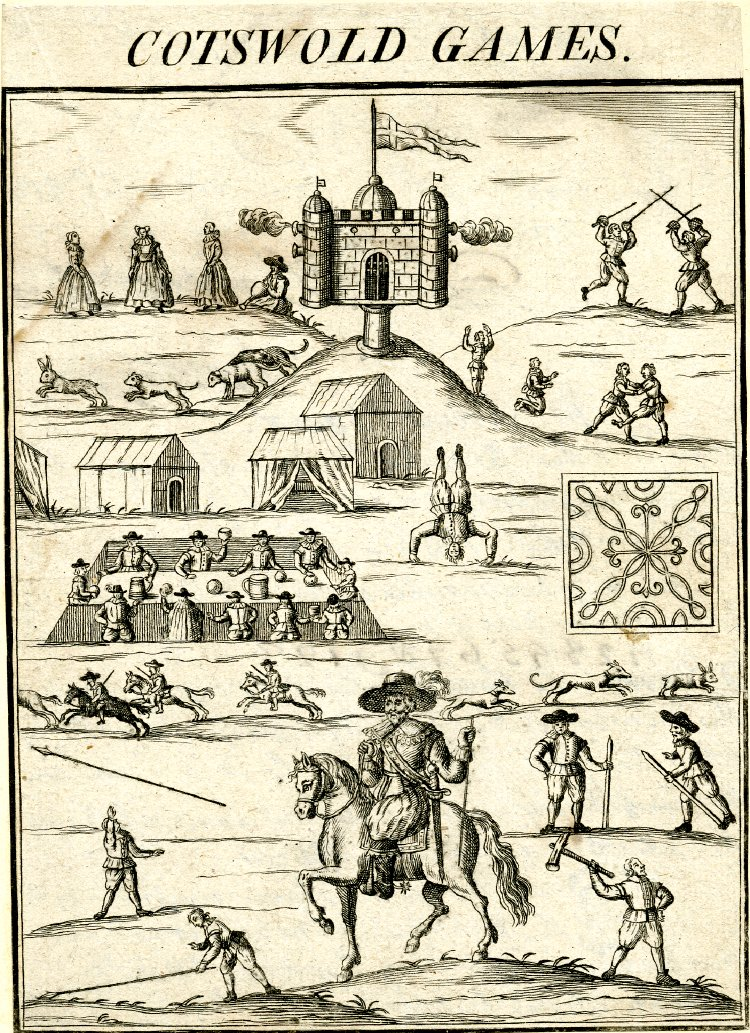
Cotswold Games, 1636 woodcut

Since the early seventeenth century, the town has been home to a championship of rural games, which later turned into Robert Dover's Cotswold Olimpick Games. The games were discontinued in 1852, but were revived in 1963 and still continue.

The Olimpicks are held every summer on the Friday evening following the late Spring bank holiday (usually late May or early June), on Dover's Hill, near Chipping Campden. Peculiar to the games is the sport of shin-kicking, where hay can be stuffed down the trousers to ease one's brave passage to later rounds.

To mark the end of the games, there is a huge bonfire and firework display. This is followed by a torch-lit procession back into the town and dancing to a local band in the square. The Scuttlebrook Wake takes place the following day. The locals don fancy dress costumes and follow the Scuttlebrook Queen, with her four attendants and Page Boy, in a procession to the centre of town pulled on a decorated dray by the town's own Morris dancers. This is then followed by the presentation of prizes and displays of Maypole and Country dancing by the two primary schools and Morris dancing. Another procession from there past the fairground in Leysbourne and the Alms Houses brings that stage of the celebration to a close whilst the fair continues into the night and, like a ghost, is gone by the morning.

The 2019 Games agenda included events such as a children's half-mile Junior Circuit, a Championship of the Hill race for adults and a Tug O’War competition. The organisers also planned fireworks, a torchlit procession, marching bands and cannons firing.

== Media ==
Local news and television programmes are provided by BBC West Midlands and ITV Central. Television signals are received from either the Sutton Coldfield or Lark Stoke TV transmitters.

The town is served by both BBC CWR and BBC Radio Gloucestershire. Other radio stations are Heart West, Greatest Hits Radio South West, Capital Mid-Counties, and North Cotswold Community Radio, a community-based station which broadcasts from the town.

The town's local newspapers are the Chipping Campden Bulletin, Evesham Observer and Cotswold Journal.

== Music ==
Since 2002, Chipping Campden has hosted what is now widely recognised as one of the UK's leading music festivals. The 2020 Festival had been scheduled to run from 9 to 23 May, but was cancelled due to the COVID-19 pandemic.

== Arts and Crafts movement ==
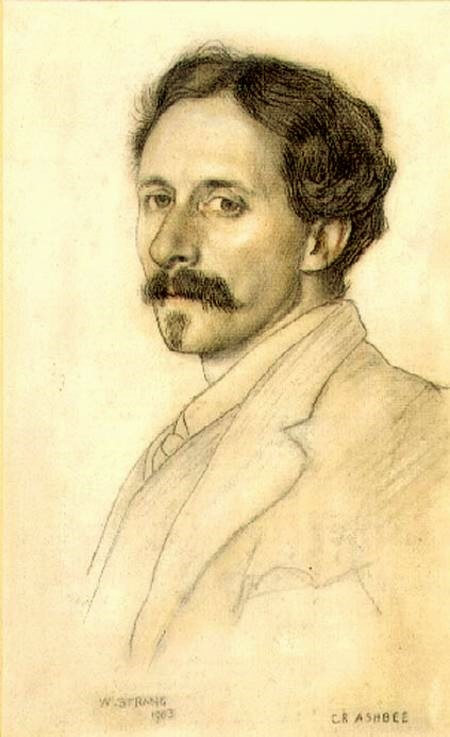
Charles Robert Ashbee, founder of the Guild and School of Handicraft. Portrait by William Strang, 1903

In the early 20th century, the town became known as a centre for the Cotswold Arts and Crafts Movement, following the move of Charles Robert Ashbee and the members of his Guild and School of Handicraft from the East End of London in 1902. According to the local historical society, the movement "focused on handmade objects, reacting against the rapidly growing dominance of machinery which resulted in the loss of craft skills". The Guild of Handicraft specialised in metalworking, producing jewellery and enamels, as well as hand-wrought copper and wrought ironwork, and furniture-making. According to Historic England, "the Guild of Handicraft, founded by Ashbee in 1888, became one of the foremost Arts and Crafts workshops of its period...formed the focus of the communal life which, as a pioneering social experiment, formed the most bold and important expression of Arts and Crafts principles." The Guild ceased operation in 1907 but the centre for crafts offers a permanent exhibition of their work.

A number of artists and writers settled in the area, including F. L. Griggs, the etcher, who built Dover's Court (now known as New Dover's House), one of the last significant Arts and Crafts houses. He set up the Campden Trust in 1929 with Norman Jewson and others, initially to protect Dover's Hill from development. According to a 2018 report, Griggs "sympathetically restored houses on the High Street, battled against a tide of ugliness that engulfed other towns and villages and used money he could ill afford to safeguard its surroundings." In 1934, he raised funds to buy the Coneygree field (where rabbits had been raised generations earlier) for the National Trust to ensure its protection. Many of Griggs' etchings are preserved at the Ashmolean Museum in Oxford.

H. J. Massingham, the rural writer who celebrated the traditions of the English countryside, also settled near the town, as did Arthur Gaskin. Ananda Coomaraswamy, the Sri Lankan philosopher and art critic and his wife the handloom weaver Ethel Mairet, settled at Broad Campden where Ashbee adapted the Norman chapel for him.

In 2005, a group of traditional craftspeople moved into The Old Silk Mill building. As of 2019, there were 28 members of this co-operative.

== Notable people ==
- Graham Greene, English novelist, playwright, short story writer and critic, lived with his wife Vivien Greene at Little Orchard in the town between 1931 and 1933.
- Ernest Wilson, plantsman, was born in the town. A memorial garden is dedicated to him.
- Sir Percy Hobart, armoured vehicle strategist and commander of the 79th Armoured Division in the Second World War, came from Chipping Campden and led the Home Guard there during the war.
- Frederick Landseer Maur Griggs has a commemorative plaque in the town.
- Sir Gordon Russell (1892–1980), celebrated furniture designer and maker, went to school in Chipping Campden and built his home, Kingcombe, here in 1925. He lived there until he died.

== Arms ==
Coat of arms of Chipping Campden

Notes
Granted 1972.
Crest
On a wreath of the colours on a garb fesswise Or banded Gules a swan rousant Proper charged on the breast with a Torteau thereon a fleur-de-Lys Or and holding in the beak by a ring Gules a fleece Or banded Gules.
Escutcheon
Gules on a pale between two woolsacks Or an ear of wheat slipped and bladed Gules on a chief engrailed Or a pale Gules between two cocks' heads erased respectant Gules and charged with a chalice Argent.
Motto
History In Stone

== Twin towns and sister cities ==
Chipping Campden is twinned with:

- Pont-d'Ouilly, France

== See also ==
- Campden Wonder
