= North Cotswold Community Radio =

Coordinates: 52.052°N 1.779°W

North Cotswold Community Radio was a non-profit community internet radio station serving primarily the North Cotswolds and the surrounding area in west-central England. The station broadcast from 2007 through 2022.

The station began broadcasting in autumn 2007. Its launch in February 2007 was delayed by some months when the station lost its intended premises at Little Rissington Business Park, but new premises were found in the basement rooms of the Old Police Station in Chipping Campden. The station was supported by The Campden and District Peelers Trust, who offered the premises at the Old Police Station; the Cotswold Conservation Board, a body that oversees the Cotswolds Area of Outstanding Natural Beauty and supports social, environmental and economic projects that benefits the local area; the Gloucestershire Community Foundation, who provided funding after the basement rooms were flooded; the Chipping Campden Community Trust; and The Co-operative Bank. The station made a bid to become an FM community radio station but delays by Ofcom, the independent body that awards community radio licences, led to the station making a complaint to the parliamentary ombudsman in 2009.

A range of different programming is broadcast including news and sport shows, and music shows featuring unsigned artists that would not get airtime on mainstream radio. The show Backtrackin hosted by Richard Price has featured actor Chris Jury, talking about his career, and Matthew and Nicole Cutler, dancers on the BBC series Strictly Come Dancing, talking about their dance partnership. A women show, Girl's Talk, featuring topical discussion and guests was launched in autumn 2009. Peter Knight, member of the folk group Steeleye Span, appeared on The Unsigned Community show, talking about his projects.

In October 2012, it was announced that the chairman Robb Eden would step down from his post at the end of the year, due to difficulties funding the community radio. He remained as the station's president and station manager. At the November meeting of the management committee, John Bowlt was elected as the new chairman of the station. John has been on the committee since 2007 with the responsibility for fundraising and has produced and presented a weekly programme, "Cotswold Country". John was involved in the music business as a drummer from the 60's until the 80's but gave up playing to concentrate on a business career in 1985. Prior to NCCR, John chaired British Standards Committees and represented the UK on worldwide committees and was the co-founder and vice president of the European Sunglass association..

In October 2022, the station announced that it would be closing after its final broadcast on the 30th of December. Station founder Robb Eden cited difficulties funding and staffing the station. Over the station's 15 years hundreds of volunteers helped to keep it on the air, some of which went on to jobs in mainstream media after gaining experience with NCCR.
