= Church of St James, Chipping Campden =

Church in Gloucestershire, England

Coordinates: 52.0533°N 1.7758°W

Church of St James
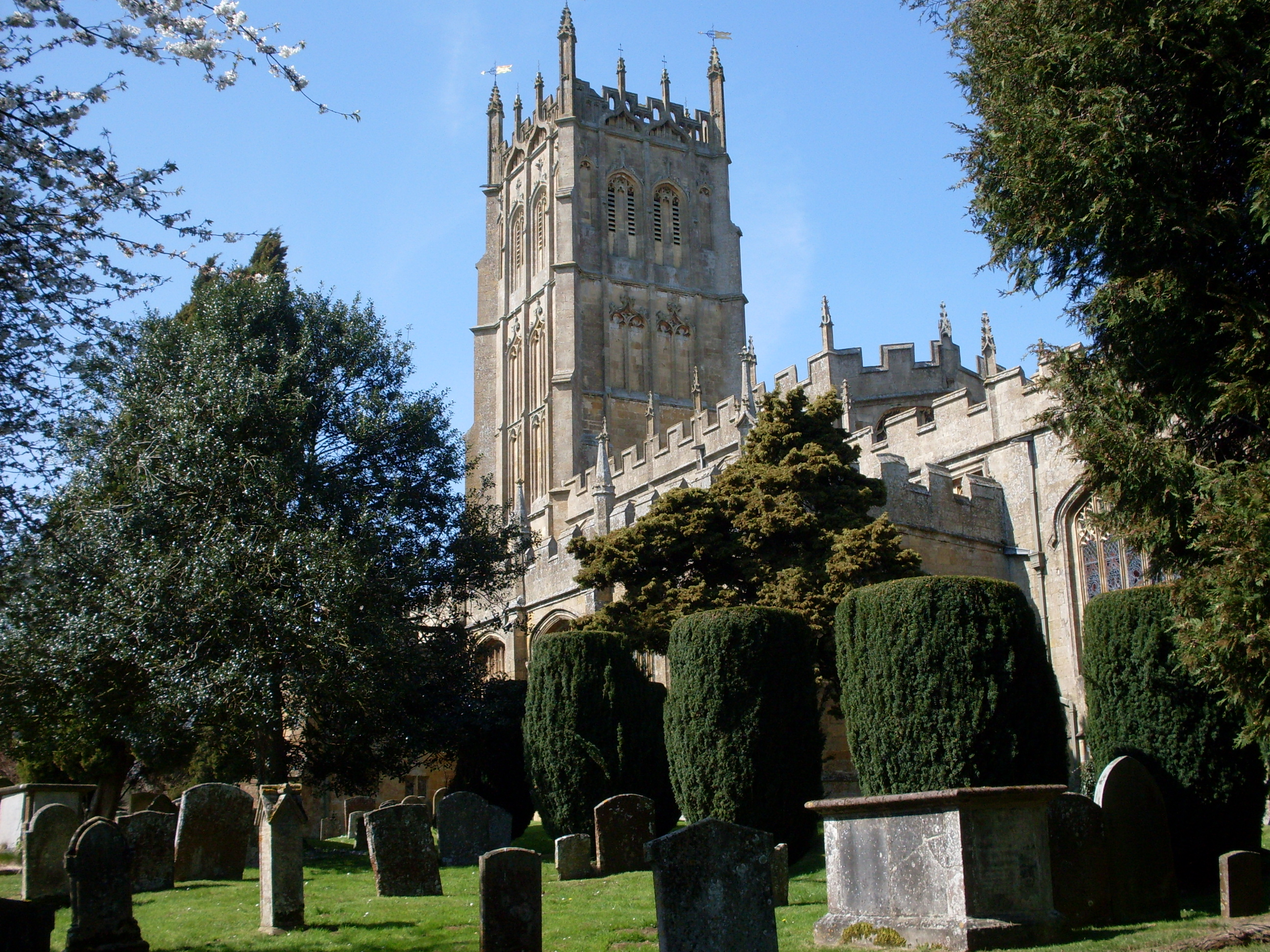

- Denomination: Church of England

Architecture
- Heritage designation: Grade I listed building

Administration
- Province: Canterbury
- Diocese: Gloucester
- Parish: Chipping Campden

The Anglican Church of St James at Chipping Campden in the Cotswold District of Gloucestershire, England, was built in the 15th century incorporating an earlier Norman church. It is a grade I listed building.

== History ==
The early perpendicular Cotswold wool church, was built in the 15th century but included elements of the Norman church which had been on the site since 1180.

The parish is part of the Vale and Cotswold Edge benefice within the Diocese of Gloucester.

== Architecture ==
The building consists of a five-bay nave, three-bay chancel, two aisles and a five-stage west tower. The tower is 119 feet (36 metres) high to the top of the pinnacles.

The interior includes medieval altar frontals (c.1500), cope (c.1400) and 17th-century monuments includes a monument to silk merchant Sir Baptist Hicks and his family. The includes a plaque to William Grevel, described as "the flower of the wool merchants of all England".
