= Chris Lambert (musician) =

American singer-songwriter, multi-instrumentalist and true-crime podcaster

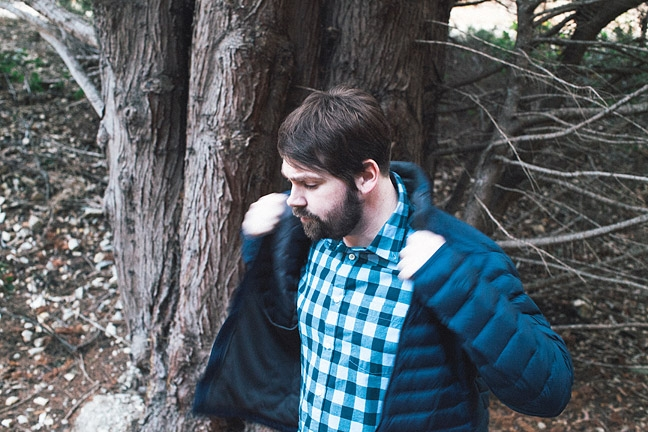
- Lambert in November 2015

Background information
- Born: March 28, 1988 (age 38); Santa Maria, California, U.S.
- Origin: Orcutt, California, U.S.
- Genres: Alternative rock

Chris Lambert (born March 28, 1988) is an American singer-songwriter, multi-instrumentalist, and podcaster. In 2019, Lambert launched a true-crime podcast documentary series about the murder of Kristin Smart, which led to arrests and ultimately a conviction in the 25-year-old case.

== Early life ==
Lambert was born in Santa Maria, California. He was raised in Orcutt, California, and attended Ernest Righetti High School.

== Career ==
A multi-instrumentalist, Lambert makes use of a variety of instruments, frequently playing many of them himself on the same track.

Lambert has released albums of varying styles, ranging from 1990s alternative rock revival to electronica, folk, and country rock.

=== True-crime podcast ===
Beginning September 30, 2019, Lambert released a multi-episode documentary podcast series called Your Own Backyard. The podcast recounts, in detail, the disappearance and murder of Kristin Smart from the campus of California Polytechnic State University in May 1996. The podcast was downloaded over five million times in its first 6 months. Renewed public interest led to a new billboard being put up in Arroyo Grande, California, in January 2020 to replace the original, which had been up since 1997.

On April 13, 2021, the San Luis Obispo County sheriff announced two arrests in the case of the disappearance of Kristin Smart, and said the podcast had helped encourage witnesses to come forward with information. The two arrests eventually resulted in the conviction of Paul Flores for the first degree murder of Kristin Smart. Following the conviction, the Smart Family, the San Luis Obispo County Sheriff, the San Luis Obispo District Attorney, and the President of Cal Poly all thanked Lambert for his role in bringing the case to a resolution.

== Discography ==
Studio Albums

- Two Guns (2007)
- Songs I'd Like to Sing Into Your Open Mouth (2008)
- The Great Dipso Drought (2009)
- Phoebe (2010)
- Phoebe, Naked (2010)
- Krakatoa Lazer Punch (2011)
- The Weatherman (2012)
- Silver Jubilee (2013)
- Warp & Woof (2014)
- The Blue Hour (2016)
- The Constant Education of Christopher Lambert (2018)
- Be Great (2024)

Soundtrack Albums

- Your Own Backyard: The Disappearance of Kristin Smart (Original Soundtrack Highlights) (2020)
- People vs. Flores (Original Soundtrack Highlights) (2023)
