= Cross Rhythms City Radio =

- England
- Broadcast area: Stoke-on-Trent & Newcastle-under-Lyme
- Frequency: 101.8 MHz

Programming
- Format: Christian Contemporary

Ownership
- Owner: Cross Rhythms

History
- First air date: 28 February 2002

Cross Rhythms City Radio is a community radio station broadcasting to Stoke-on-Trent and Newcastle-under-Lyme, Staffordshire, on 101.8FM. The station is music-driven with contemporary pop, rock, urban music and dance. It is underpinned by Christian values but driven by local issues.

In addition to regular programming with community groups such as the council, police, health, education and employment agencies, the radio daily interacts with local businesses, arts and culture groups, local events and charities, theatres, ethnic-focused organisations and many others.

The station was one of the original 15 to be granted pilot licences for a new form of local radio, then known as Access Radio. Following several extensions of the pilot scheme (now renamed Community Radio), a full five-year licence was granted in June 2005. Cross Rhythms City Radio was the first FM Christian station in the UK to be granted a full licence.

Cross Rhythms City Radio is operated by Cross Rhythms, a media organisation whose aim is to impact youth and the wider community for good through FM radio, contemporary Christian music and a globally influential website.

== Presenters ==
Jonathan Bellamy
Chris Cole
Deanna Fletcher. Sophia Barrett, Paul Reid (Audacious Radio Show)
Steve Gambill
Jan Husband
Jenny Hutchinson
Chip Kendall
Chris Mountford
Shell Perris
Lee Plummer
Bernard Reilly
Straff
DJ Zorro
