= Hans Reiser =

American computer programmer, entrepreneur, and convicted murderer

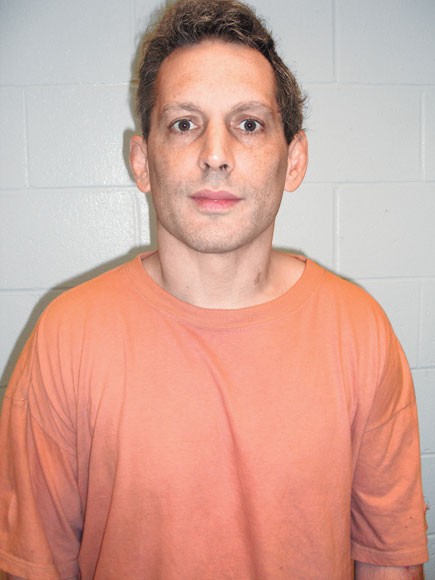
- Hans Reiser in 2006
- Born: Hans Thomas Reiser; December 19, 1963 (age 62); Oakland, California, U.S.
- Occupations: Computer programmer, entrepreneur
- Known for: ReiserFS, murder
- Spouse: Nina Reiser (m. 1998; murdered 2006)
- Children: 2
- Parents: Ramon Reiser (father); Beverly Palmer (mother)
- Status: Imprisoned
- Convictions: First degree murder by jury, reduced to second degree murder by judge in plea deal
- Penalty: 15 years to life imprisonment (parole in 2025 refused, next hearing is in October 2028)

Details
- Date apprehended: October 10, 2006

Hans Thomas Reiser (born December 19, 1963) is an American computer programmer, entrepreneur, and convicted murderer. In April 2008, Reiser was convicted of the first-degree murder of his wife, Nina Reiser, who disappeared in September 2006. He subsequently pleaded guilty to a reduced charge of second-degree murder, as part of a settlement agreement that included disclosing the location of Nina Reiser's body, which he revealed to be in a shallow grave near the couple's home.

Prior to his incarceration, Reiser created the ReiserFS computer file system, which may be used by the Linux kernel but is now removed, as well as its attempted successor, Reiser4. In 2004, he founded Namesys, a corporation meant to coordinate the development of both file systems.

== Childhood, education, and career ==
Hans Thomas Reiser was born in Oakland, California to Ramon and Beverly (née Kleiber) Reiser and grew up in the same city. He dropped out of junior high school when he was 13 because of his disdain for what he considered an overly rigid, conventional schooling system, and for constantly being ridiculed and bullied by his peers. Reiser stated in interviews that, at the age of 15, he was accepted into the University of California, Berkeley. Reiser attended the university off and on until he received a BS in computer science in 1992 at age 28.

== Namesys and ReiserFS ==
Reiser and his company Namesys developed the journaled computer file systems ReiserFS and Reiser4. ReiserFS has been available in the Linux operating system since version 2.4.1 and has, at times, been the default filesystem on several Linux distributions including, until 2006, Novell's SUSE Linux Enterprise.

Following Reiser's 2006 arrest on suspicion of murder, people in the free software community expressed concern over the future of Reiser's newer filesystem (Reiser4). Jonathan Corbet, editor of LWN.net, argued that the immaturity of Reiser4's feature set and Reiser's extensive combative relationship with the community meant that the filesystem's future had been limited in any event.

Shortly after Reiser's arrest, the employees of Namesys stated that they would continue to work, that the arrest had no immediate effect on the rate of the software's development, and if the case expanded over a longer time, they would seek solutions to ensure the long-term future of the company. On December 21, 2006, Reiser announced that he was selling the company to raise money for his increasing legal fees. According to an interview with Namesys employee Edward Shishkin, as of January 2008, the commercial activity of the company had ceased, but it had not been sold.

In November 2023, Reiser wrote a letter to Fredrick Brennan from prison, who forwarded it with Reiser's permission to the Linux kernel mailing list (LKML), in which Reiser recounts his regrets regarding how he interacted with the Linux community.

ReiserFS was removed from the Linux kernel in November 2024.

== Murder of Nina Reiser ==
=== Marriage ===
In 1998, while working in Saint Petersburg, Russia, Reiser arranged to meet a Russian woman he selected from a mail-order bride catalog. To communicate with the woman, Reiser hired an interpreter, Nina Sharanova (Russian: Нина Шаранова). Five months later, he married Nina. Nina was a Russian-born and trained obstetrician and gynecologist. They had two children.

Hans's father, Ramon, became suspicious of his new daughter-in-law when she took the title of CFO at Namesys at that time. Ramon was trained in military interviewing techniques and claimed that Nina lied to him when he confronted her about the fast-shrinking reserves of Namesys.

The Reisers separated in May 2004. Nina filed for divorce three months later, citing irreconcilable differences and alleging that their children "hardly know their father" because he was out of the country on business for most of the year, according to court records. She was granted sole legal custody of the children and shared physical custody with her husband. The divorce was not finalized when she disappeared.

Nina obtained a temporary restraining order against Hans in December 2004 after he pushed her at the height of the divorce proceedings. She dropped the temporary restraining order in late 2005 because the heat of the divorce had chilled over time. In exchange, Hans agreed to be bound by a one-year civil restraining order which prohibited him from "contacting, harassing or disturbing the peace" of Nina. In May, Nina alleged in court filings that her husband had failed to pay 50 percent medical expenses and childcare expenses as ordered by a judge and was in arrears for more than $12,000.

=== Nina Reiser's murder and disappearance ===
According to a later confession by Hans to authorities, on September 3, 2006, Nina dropped their children off with Hans at his mother's house, where he was living at the time. The pair got into a heated argument, and Hans strangled her. He buried her body in an isolated area over the course of two nights.

Nina was reported missing on September 5, 2006. She had last been seen on September 3, when she dropped the children off at Hans's mother's house.

Nina's minivan, with groceries inside, was found on September 9. It was reported by police that neighbors first spotted the parked minivan on September 5.

Hans's neighbors said that they saw him hosing something down in the driveway for half an hour shortly after Nina went missing and said that his car disappeared shortly after, and his mother rented a car so Hans could drive hers. Police searched his property.

Following Nina's disappearance, Hans attempted to obtain custody but was unsuccessful. Oakland police testified against Hans Reiser at the custody hearing, though they did not reveal the evidence on which they based their concerns.

=== Murder investigation ===
Later that month, Oakland police briefly detained Hans Reiser, served him with a search warrant on his person, and obtained a DNA sample. On October 10, 2006, following the second search of his home, Oakland police and Homeland Security Investigations (HSI) investigators removed a number of items. HSI had been investigating Reiser for money laundering. Police arrested Reiser for the murder of Nina and charged him.

On October 11, 2006, law enforcement officials said that blood spatter had been found in Reiser's house and car. Forensic testing could neither confirm nor rule out Nina as the source of the blood. Daniel Horowitz, a high-profile defense attorney, joined the defense team and dropped the case on November 28, citing Reiser's inability to pay for his services.

Namesys's employees said that Reiser felt that the police would suspect him from the start. Reiser was arraigned on Thursday, October 12, where he delayed entering a plea until his next court appearance on November 28. He was held without bail. On November 28, Reiser entered a not-guilty plea and invoked his right to a speedy trial, forcing the state to schedule a preliminary hearing for December 11.

On December 2, at the request of the Oakland police, search-and-rescue teams combed an area less than three miles (5 km) from Hans Reiser's house, but no new major findings were announced.

=== Trial ===
On March 9, 2007, the judge ruled that Reiser would stand trial and set Reiser's arraignment for March 23.

On March 23, Reiser pleaded not guilty. Shortly after, the court learned of a complication in the trial regarding a former friend of Reiser, Sean Sturgeon. Sturgeon, who had previously dated Nina Reiser, claimed responsibility for eight murders and "possibly" a ninth. In an interview with Wired News, Sturgeon denied that Nina Reiser was one of them. The police doubted that the murders ever took place, and Judge Clay issued a gag order against discussing Sturgeon before the trial.

Hans Reiser's murder trial began on November 6. Reiser denied responsibility for the murder throughout the trial. When Reiser testified in his own defense, his implausible claims and erratic behavior in the courtroom largely undermined his claim of innocence. Psychiatrist Beverly Parr testified that he "possibly" exhibited symptoms of Asperger syndrome but did not make a diagnosis.

On April 28, 2008, Hans Reiser was found guilty of first degree murder.

=== Recovery of Nina's body and sentencing ===
Prosecutors agreed to a deal whereby Reiser would reveal the location of Nina's body in exchange for being allowed to plead guilty to second-degree murder. On Monday, July 7, 2008, Reiser led police to where he had buried Nina's remains. Oakland homicide detective Lt. Ersie Joyner recalled that Reiser led them directly to the exact site, without any hesitation or confusion. Police held a press conference the following day, July 8, 2008, where they announced dental records confirmed the remains were those of Nina Reiser.

On August 29, 2008, Reiser was sentenced to 15 years to life, the maximum sentence for second-degree murder. As a result of his plea bargain, Reiser cannot appeal his conviction or sentence.

=== Time in prison ===
On September 5, 2008, Reiser arrived at San Quentin State Prison to begin his sentence. Reiser tried to appeal his second-degree murder conviction on October 30, 2008. The request was denied on November 13, 2008.

On January 10, 2009, it was reported that Reiser was recovering after having been beaten by several prisoners. On January 28, 2009, he was transferred to Mule Creek State Prison. In February 2011, he was transferred to Pleasant Valley State Prison. In 2020, Reiser was housed at the Correctional Training Facility near Soledad, California. As of March 2026, he is in the California Health Care Facility. His last parole in 2025 was denied. He may appeal again in 2028.

In September 2011, Hans Reiser filed a civil lawsuit. In his complaint, he named more than 70 defendants, including trial judges and his attorney, William Du Bois. He claimed, among other things, that his attorney had conspired with the judge to file motions against him, which were impossible to appeal, and that his attorney had forced him to take the stand against his will. The lawsuit was dismissed with prejudice.

In July 2012, a jury awarded Reiser's children $60 million against their father for the death of Nina Reiser. Hans Reiser acted as his own attorney during the trial and tried to argue that he killed his wife to protect their children.
