= Community radio in the United Kingdom =

In the United Kingdom, community radio refers to a system of licensing small, micro-local, non-profit radio stations, which started in 2002. In its early days, the pilot scheme was known as access radio. New legislation paved the way for this additional tier of radio, starting in 2005, and hundreds of community stations have since been set up. Unlike commercial radio licensing, which is generally advertised to cover a specific region, community radio stations are usually limited to broadcast areas smaller than commercial or BBC local stations, nominally within a 5 kilometres (3.1 mi) radius of their transmitter.

== History ==
The feasibility of this level of radio broadcasting was tested in 2002 by the regulator at the time, the Radio Authority, with the licensing of 15 'access radio' stations for a trial period of one year. The licences were extended in 2003 for a further year, and in 2004 a consultation was issued by the Authority's successor, Ofcom, on the creation of Community Radio. Following this, an invitation to groups to apply for community radio licences nationwide was issued. One hundred and ninety two stations applied and of those, one hundred and six were awarded licences. The first new community radio station to be licensed was youth-based AfanFM in Neath-Port Talbot, and the first to go on-air was 103 The Eye in Melton Mowbray.

By November 2010, 228 stations had been licensed over two rounds of licensing, with 181 broadcasting, 17 that had decided not to launch or handed their licence back, and the remainder preparing to start broadcasting.

=== Digital transition ===
In 2020, following a number of successful trials of the technology and the passing of relevant legislation, Ofcom began to issue licences for small-scale DAB multiplexes. These are intended to offer a low-cost route into digital radio for small-scale community radio stations, as well as the small number of small-scale commercial radio stations still in existence.

== Licensing ==
There was a second round of licensing in 2007, and as of 2010 Ofcom was considering a third. Unlike in commercial radio licensing, which is generally advertised to cover a specific region, prospective operators are able to specify the target area and format of their station.

To obtain a community radio licence, applicants must demonstrate that the proposed station will meet the needs of a specified target community, together with required "social gain" objectives set out in the application. These usually take the form of a commitment to train local people in broadcasting skills or provide a certain amount of programming aimed at an underserved section of the population.

A target community can be defined either by geography or by reference to a particular sub-community in an area, otherwise known as a community of interest. A geographic community is any defined local area, particularly those that cannot sustain a fully commercial broadcaster. A community of interest can be any identifiable local community; existing community stations are aimed at groups as diverse as the elderly or youth, religious groups, speakers of languages other than English, groups such as the LGBTQ+ community and cultural/recreational groups such as artists.

While there are exceptions in certain rural areas, community radio stations are usually limited to broadcast areas smaller than commercial or BBC local stations, nominally within a 5 kilometres (3.1 mi) radius of their transmitter. The normal allocated power for a new community radio station in an urban area is 25 watts vertically polarised, although most allocations permit the addition of a further 25 watts horizontally polarised. For some rural stations these limits are increased to 50 watts vertical plus 50 watts horizontal.

== Funding ==
Following pressure from the UK's Commercial Radio Companies Association, later merged into Radiocentre, the Community Radio Order 2004 (SI 2004/1944) included varying funding stipulations based on a community radio station's proximity to a commercial radio broadcaster. No community radio station is permitted to raise more than 50% of its operating costs from a single source, including on-air sponsorship and advertising. The remainder of operating costs must be met through other sources, which can include public funding via grants, donor income, National Lottery funding or charities. Ofcom also makes an amount of funding available annually through its Community Radio Fund. Stations may apply for this money in the same way as other grant funding.

OFCOM shall not grant a community radio licence to any applicant who proposes to receive from—

(a) any one person, or
(b) from any one person and any other persons connected with him, taken together,

more than 50 per cent. of the income that would be required in each financial year of the applicant to provide the proposed service in that year. — Schedule to the Community Radio Order 2004 (SI 2004/1944)

However, where a community radio station lies totally within the transmission area of a commercial station with a population coverage of under 150,000, no sponsorship or advertising may be sought and all funding must come from alternative sources. In a small number of areas where a commercial station covers a population of under 150,000, a community radio station may not be licensed at all. This protects the financial interests of smaller commercial stations.

== Access Radio pilot stations ==
The following stations took part in the Access Radio pilot beginning in 2002:

Station	Location	Format	Frequency
ALL FM	South Manchester	Multicultural	96.9 FM
Angel Radio	Havant, Hampshire	Over-60s	101.1 FM (now 98.6 FM and 94.8 FM)
Awaz FM	Glasgow	Asian	107.2 FM
Bradford Community Broadcasting	Bradford	Multicultural	96.7 FM (now 106.6 FM)
Cross Rhythms City Radio	Stoke-on-Trent	Christian music	101.8 FM
Desi Radio	Southall, West London	Punjabi	1602 AM
Faza FM Broadcasting as Radio Faza	Nottingham	Asian women's station	97.1 FM
Forest of Dean Radio	Forest of Dean, Gloucestershire	Rural community station	1521 AM, 1503 AM (closed December 2009)
GTFM	Pontypridd, Glamorgan	Local talk and music	106.9 FM (now 107.9 FM)
New Style Radio	Birmingham	Afro-Caribbean talk/music	98.7 FM
Northern Visions Radio	Belfast	General	100.6 FM (now closed)
Resonance FM	Central London	Artistic community	104.4 FM
Sound Radio	Hackney, East London	Multicultural	1503 AM (now closed)
Takeover Radio	Leicester	Children's radio	103.2 FM
Wythenshawe FM	Wythenshawe, South Manchester	Music and local talk	97.2 FM

== Current licence regime ==
The Access Radio scheme was superseded by two alternative licence arrangements. A restricted service licence (RSL) permits transmissions for up to 28 days and is available upon application. A community radio licence permits up to five years of broadcasting, but is only available on a discretionary basis when Ofcom opens application rounds.

== See also ==
- List of community radio stations in the United Kingdom
- Community Media Association
- The Radio Academy
