= Forest of Dean Radio =

Community radio station in Gloucestershire, England

England
- Broadcast area: Forest of Dean
- Frequencies: 1521 MW, 1503 MW

Programming
- Format: Local news and music

Ownership
- Owner: Forest of Dean Radio

History
- First air date: 1995

Links
- Website: www.fodradio.org

Forest of Dean Radio was a community radio station in Gloucestershire. It was established in 1995 and started with a 3-day broadcast to coincide with the Cinderford Carnival. It broadcast around the whole of the Forest of Dean Area from its main studio in Cinderford.

== History ==
Initially the station was broadcasting using a Restricted Service Licence. At this time a 28-day licence was the only option and expensive. By 1998 this had changed to enable broadcasting on a daily rate. In the next few years a series of locally based broadcast projects usually 4 days at a time were developed across the Forest of Dean District. In each setting 3 months of training and programme making with people of all ages and abilities would take place to really ground the locality of content and ownership. Small towns hosting their own stations included Lydney, Sedbury, Mitcheldean, Cinderford, Newent and Coleford. This community involvement bubbled toward the opportunity to broadcast across the whole area and become the first ever Community radio station to be awarded a full-time licence in the UK following a couple of years on air as an Ofcom pilot experiment which included 12 other community stations. At this point an independent survey commissioned by Ofcom came up with a FOD Radio listenership of almost 10%, with BBC Local radio at around 8%, this was quite an achievement.(RD 25/10/13)

In 2002, Forest of Dean Radio was awarded an Access Radio Licence which allowed the station to broadcast 7 days a week on a fixed Medium Wave frequency. Then in 2005, the station became the first ever fully licensed Community Radio Station in the UK.

Shows included the Really popular Sunday afternoon show Fresh Hits with Ryan Davies & Justin, The Verdict, a sports show with Jamie Harris and Tom Jackson, and Phils Acoustic sessions.

The station ceased full-time broadcasting on 31 December 2009 The final broadcast included a Christmas Radio Show; organised, written, and performed by the young people of Newent Youth Club. It included a Christmas radio play, interviews and musical performances by the young people.
