= List of murder convictions without a body =

A murder conviction without a body is an instance of a person being convicted of murder despite the absence of the victim's body. Circumstantial and forensic evidence are prominent in such convictions. Hundreds of such convictions have occurred in the past, some of which have been overturned. In all cases, unless otherwise noted, the remains of the victims were never recovered.

Conviction overturned due to the supposed victim being found alive after the conviction
Conviction overturned for other reasons
Partial remains recovered, or body was located after a conviction

== Argentina ==
Victim(s)	Convicted	Location	Disappeared	Conviction date	Description
Tehuel de la Torre	Luis Alberto Ramos	Alejandro Korn, Buenos Aires	11 March 2021	30 August 2024	Torre, a transgender man, disappeared after travelling to Alejandro Korn to meet with Ramos, who had offered him a job as a waiter. Evidence from both men's phones proved that Torre had arrived at Ramos' home, and Torre's blood and burnt items of clothing were found there. Ramos, who had made disparaging remarks about Torre's gender identity, was the first person in Argentina to be convicted for an anti-transgender homicide.
Cecilia Strzyzowski	César Sena, Emerenciano Sena, Marcela Acuña, Gustavo Obregón, Fabiana González, Gustavo Melgarejo	Resistencia, Chaco	2 June 2023	15 November 2025	Cecilia Strzyzowski disappeared at the home of her boyfriend César Sena, the son of powerful local politicians Emerenciano Sena and Marcela Acuña, who had pressured him to end the relationship. Security footage showed that Cecilia never left the property, and that César and both his parents were present that day. Large amounts of Cecilia's blood and burnt personal effects were found, as were bone fragments which could not be proved to belong to Cecilia. César and his parents were convicted of murder, and three family employees were convicted as accomplices.

== Australia ==
Victim(s)	Convicted	Location	Disappeared	Conviction date	Description
Louis Carron	John Rowles	Murchison Region, Western Australia	May 1930	19 March 1932	Louis Carron became the final victim in the Murchison Murders, in which John Rowles used a body disposal method that had been suggested by author Arthur Upfield. However, Rowles had forgotten to complete one of the steps after Carron's murder. He was convicted of wilful murder for killing Carron and executed on June 13, 1932.
Azaria Chamberlain	Lindy Chamberlain-Creighton, Michael Chamberlain	Uluru, Uluṟu-Kata Tjuṯa National Park, Northern Territory	17 August 1980	29 October 1982	An infant who is now believed to have been killed by a dingo while on a camping trip with her parents. Her mother was convicted of the murder in 1982 and her father was convicted as an accessory to the crime. However, following the discovery of the baby's clothing in an area frequented by the animals, the charges were overturned in September 1988. Evil Angels, journalist John Bryson's book about the case, was the basis for the eponymous film known as A Cry in the Dark internationally.
Louise Bell	Raymond Geesing	Hackham West, City of Onkaparinga, Adelaide, South Australia	4 January 1983	1983	10-year-old Louise Bell was abducted from her home in Hackham West in January 1983. Raymond Geesing, a man serving time in prison for an unrelated crime, was convicted of her murder after supposedly confessing to jailhouse informers, but his conviction was quashed 17 months later after the witnesses were deemed to be unreliable. Years later, child killer Dieter Pfennig was convicted of the murder.
Louise Bell	Dieter Pfennig	Hackham West, City of Onkaparinga, Adelaide, South Australia	4 January 1983	10 November 2016	10-year-old Louise Bell was abducted from her home in Hackham West in January 1983. Raymond Geesing, a man serving time in prison for an unrelated crime, was convicted of her murder after supposedly confessing to jailhouse informers, but his conviction was quashed 17 months later after the witnesses were deemed to be unreliable. Years later, child killer Dieter Pfennig was convicted of the murder.
Peter Burton	Margaret Anne Burton	New South Wales	May 1983	November 1984	In November 1984, Margaret Burton was convicted of murder and conspiracy to commit murder in the disappearance of her husband, Peter Burton. A close friend, Ronald Burke, was only convicted of conspiracy to commit murder. Margaret was sentenced to life in prison for murder and, along with Ronald Burke, eight years for conspiracy to commit murder. On September 24, 1986, the New South Wales Court of Appeal unanimously overturned Margaret's murder conviction after a close friend of Peter Burton, Judy Edmonds, identified him in the crowd at a televised cricket match. Margaret's conviction and 8-year sentence for conspiracy to commit murder were not overturned.
Samantha Knight	Michael Guider	Bondi, Sydney, New South Wales	19 August 1986	28 August 2002	A nine-year-old girl abducted from her home. Guider, a pedophile who drugged his victims with temazepam before molesting them, pleaded guilty to her manslaughter when he was already behind bars for other crimes. According to Guider, Knight never recovered after being drugged, and he later buried, dug up and re-buried her body in two different Sydney locations to evade suspicion. It is believed that the body was ultimately removed or destroyed during the construction of a carpark.
Carel Gottgens	Patricia Byers	Brisbane, Queensland	6 July 1990	1999	Gottgens disappeared while planning to leave Byers, who had forged documents to fraudulently take possession of his assets after his disappearance. Police did not become suspicious until Byers attempted to murder another partner in 1993. Byers maintained her innocence for years, but eventually confessed to murdering Gottgens in 2016.
Prue Bird	Leslie Camilleri	Glenroy, Melbourne, Victoria	2 February 1992	9 December 2012	Prue Bird disappeared from her home in Glenroy in 1992 and was never seen again. Leslie Camilleri, one of the perpetrators of the Bega schoolgirl murders, pleaded guilty to killing Bird in 2012, claiming that he acted alone and without premeditation. However, inconsistencies in his confession and witness testimony linking him to the crime led the court to reject his story and conclude that he premeditatedly abducted and murdered Bird with help from another man who had since died in prison. Camilleri, already serving a life sentence, was sentenced to an additional 28 years.
Dorothy Davis, Kerry Whelan	Bruce Burrell	Sydney, New South Wales	30 May 1995 – May 1997	2006	Two women who disappeared, Davis after going to visit Burrell's wife, and Whelan after boarding Burrell's car.
Tegan Lee Lane	Keli Lane	Auburn, Cumberland City Council, New South Wales	12 September 1996	10 December 2010	After the mother attempted to adopt out a child in 1999, DOCS workers uncovered evidence of two previous children one of whom could not be located and notified police. After years of investigation and a coroner's inquest charges were laid in 2009, ultimately leading to a conviction on a majority verdict.
Hayley Dodd	Francis Wark	Badgingarra, Wheatbelt Region Western Australia	29 July 1999	2018	Wark, a convicted rapist, abducted 17-year-old Hayley Dodd while she was walking near a property he owned in Badgingarra. A cold case review in 2015 led to evidence linking him to Dodd being found in Wark's car and he was convicted of killing her in 2018. He was given a second trial in 2021, but was convicted again.
Keith William Allan	Sudo Cavkic, Costas Athanasi, Julian Michael Clarke	Melbourne, Victoria	28 May 2000	2007	A contract killing in which three men were convicted of the crime.
Peter Falconio	Bradley John Murdoch	Barrow Creek, Northern Territory	14 July 2001	13 December 2005	Falconio was murdered by a truck driver while holidaying with his girlfriend, Joanne Lees. Lees survived the ordeal and was able to escape and identify Murdoch as the killer. However, Murdoch had disposed of Falconio's body by the time authorities went to arrest him.
Susan Christie	Rory Christie	Perth, Western Australia	15 November 2001	2003	Rory Christie was convicted of killing his missing wife Susan in a dispute over the custody of their son. The only physical evidence against him was a tie belonging to him with a small amount of Susan's blood on it. In 2005, Christie was granted a new trial after evidence came to light supporting his contention that the blood came from where he had helped Susan with a nosebleed earlier in the day. The following month, the trial judge threw out the case against him for lack of evidence and Christie was released from prison after four years.
George Templeton	Robyn Lindholm	Reservoir, Melbourne, Victoria	2 May 2005	October 2019	Templeton disappeared on the anniversary of his father's death and was reported missing by his girlfriend Robyn Lindholm. Lindholm later confessed that Templeton had been murdered at her direction by Wayne Amey, who was himself later murdered by Lindholm, and his body was thrown into Port Phillip Bay.
Bob Chappell	Susan Blyth Neill-Fraser	Hobart, Tasmania	26 January 2009	15 October 2010	Susan Blyth Neill-Fraser was given a 23-year prison sentence for murdering her partner, Bob Chappell, whilst aboard their yacht, which was moored off Sandy Bay on Australia Day in 2009. Mr. Chappell's body has never been found, nor has the murder weapon.
Barbara, Leanne and Vicki McCulkin	Garry Dubois	Brisbane, Queensland	16 January 1974	28 November 2016	Barbara McCulkin and her two daughters disappeared from their home in Brisbane in 1974, in what became one of Australia's oldest cold cases. Criminals Vincent O'Dempsey and Garry Dubois were charged with their murders in 1980 but avoided conviction. Years later, both men were charged again and convicted after it came to light that they had boasted of murdering the victims and burying their bodies in bushland. They were suspected to have targeted Barbara McCulkin to prevent her from talking about their role in nightclub bombings.
Barbara, Leanne and Vicki McCulkin	Vincent O'Dempsey	Brisbane, Queensland	16 January 1974	26 May 2017	
Lynette Dawson	Chris Dawson	Sydney, New South Wales	9 January 1982	30 August 2022	Chris Dawson was convicted of murdering his wife, Lyn Dawson, in a judge-only trial. The prosecution's circumstantial case alleged Dawson murdered her to pursue a relationship with their babysitter, and the judge was satisfied beyond reasonable doubt that Lynette Dawson died "as a result of a conscious and voluntary act" by Chris Dawson. On 2 December 2022, Dawson was sentenced to 24 years in jail, with a non-parole period of 18 years.
Bruce Schuler	Stephen Struber, Dianne Wilson-Struber	Palmerville Station, Cape York, Queensland	9 July 2012	24 July 2015	Schuler and three other men were prospecting for gold with metal detectors on the Strubers' vast and remote cattle property. Either Mr Struber or Ms Wilson-Struber shot or otherwise killed Schuler, aided by the other. They then burnt incriminating evidence at the scene and later disposed of Schuler's body and possession in an unknown place.

== Belgium ==
Victim(s)	Convicted	Location	Disappeared	Conviction date	Description
Edit Fintor, Ilona Sőrés; Andrea, Dániel, Zoltán and Tünde Pándy	András and Ágnes Pándy	Brussels Capital Region	1986 – 1990	6 March 2002	The two wives, two sons, and two of the step-daughters of András Pándy. The conviction relied heavily on the forgery of documents by Pándy aiming to prove that the disappeared had left the country, and the testimony of his eldest step-daughter Ágnes, who confessed to have helped Pándy murder the victims, dismember and partially dissolve the bodies in drain cleaner, and throw any remains in an Anderlecht slaughterhouse's dumpsite. Following Pándy's arrest, the skeletons of seven women and one man were discovered buried in concrete under one of his properties, but they did not belong to his family.

== Brazil ==
Victim(s)	Convicted	Location	Disappeared	Conviction date	Description
Eliza Samudio	Bruno Fernandes das Dores de Souza	Esmeraldas, Minas Gerais, Southeast Region	9 June 2010	8 March 2013	The convict's former mistress and mother of his illegitimate child, she disappeared after suing him for child support. The child also vanished, but was found in the care of Souza's wife. Souza's cousin and accomplice testified that Souza had dismembered Samudio after abducting and killing her, feeding some parts to his rottweilers and burying the rest in concrete.

== Canada ==
Victim(s)	Convicted	Location	Disappeared	Conviction date	Description
John Snow	Catherine Mandeville Snow, Tobias Mandeville, Arthur Spring	Harbour Grace, Newfoundland	August 31, 1833	January 10, 1834	Catherine Mandeville Snow, her cousin Tobias, and her servant Arthur Spring were tried for the murder of her husband John. Mandeville and Spring testified that John was shot and thrown into the sea at Catherine's behest, although both claimed the other was the actual killer. All three were sentenced to death and hanged later that year. John Snow's body was never found. A mock retrial in 2012 cleared Catherine, but this verdict had no legal weight.
Elizabeth Bain	Robert Baltovich	Scarborough, Toronto, Ontario	June 19, 1990	March 31, 1992	The convict's girlfriend, Bain disappeared after telling her mother that she was going to check the tennis schedule on the University of Toronto Scarborough campus. On June 22, Bain's car was found with a large bloodstain on the backseat. In his trial, Baltovich claimed his innocence and accused the at the time unidentified Scarborough Rapist of being the real murderer. After new evidence surfaced, Baltovich was granted a retrial and found not guilty on April 22, 2008.
Hugh Sinclair	Timothy Culham	Toronto, Ontario	July 7, 1997	June 14, 2001	Sinclair, an antiques collector, was murdered by his acquaintance Timothy Culham so that Culham could sell his collection. Sinclair's blood was found in Culham's kitchen and in the back of a "foul-smelling" car that Culham had driven from Sinclair's house the day he disappeared.
Marnie Frey, Georgina Papin, Brenda Wolfe	Robert Pickton	Vancouver, Metro Vancouver, British Columbia	September 4, 1999 – April 2000	December 9, 2007	Three sex workers among the victims of serial killer Robert Pickton, who murdered women and fed their remains to pigs. Jaw bones belonging to Frey and Wolfe and hand bones belonging to Papin were found on Pickton's pig farm, alongside the heads, hands and feet of three other women.
Lyne Massicotte	Alain Perreault	Quebec City, Capitale-Nationale, Quebec	July 17, 2003	September 29, 2016 (retrial)	Lyne Massicotte disappeared after going to Quebec City for a date with a man she had met online. Alain Perreault was convicted in 2011; he had confessed to undercover police officers that he killed her, sexually abused her corpse, and threw her into the St. Lawrence River. He was given another trial in 2016, but was convicted for a second time.
Lyle and Marie McCann	Travis Vader	Edson, Yellowhead County, Alberta	July 3, 2010	September 15, 2016	An elderly couple who disappeared during a road trip; only the charred remains of their motorhome were found. Vader was convicted of second-degree murder after being arrested a second time, having spent four years in jail before the charges were dropped following his first arrest. Testimony at his second trial established that his blood was found mixed with that of the victims in the vehicle; prosecutors theorize that Vader, a meth addict, killed the McCanns in the course of a botched robbery attempt. Conviction was later downgraded to manslaughter as there was no evidence Vader had acted with intent to kill.
Sandra Klaus	Jason Klaus, Joshua Frank	Castor, County of Paintearth No. 18, Alberta	December 8, 2013	January 10, 2018	Klaus and Frank admitted to undercover police officers that they had conspired to murder Klaus's parents and sister and destroy the bodies in a house fire. The body of one of the victims, Sandra Klaus, was never recovered and is believed to have been destroyed in the fire.
Nathan O'Brien, Kathryn Liknes, Alvin Liknes	Douglas Garland	Calgary, Rocky View County/Foothills County, Alberta	June 29, 2014	February 16, 2017	Garland was convicted of abducting, torturing, killing, dismembering and burning the Liknes family, including their grandson Nathan O'Brien, over a long-running patent dispute with Alvin Liknes. The victim's DNA was found in and around an incinerator on Garland's property and he had researched dismembering and disposing of dead bodies shortly before the family disappeared.
Morgan Harris, Marcedes Myran, Ashlee Shingoose	Jeremy Skibicki	Winnipeg, Winnipeg Metropolitan Region, Manitoba	May 2022	July 11, 2024	Three Indigenous Canadian women abducted and murdered by serial killer Jeremy Skibicki, who concealed their bodies in a landfill. The remains of Harris and Myran were later recovered.

== France ==
Victim(s)	Convicted	Location	Disappeared	Conviction date	Description
140+ victims	Gilles de Rais, Henriet Griart, Étienne Corillaut, François Prelati, others	Pays de la Loire	1438 – 1440	October 1440	Rais and several members of his household were convicted by an ecclesiastical court of the sodomy and murder of over 140 children in the Nantes region who were alleged to have disappeared after being taken away by servants of Rais. Rais admitted before the court to having sexually abused, killed and dismembered hundreds of victims in an attempt to invoke a demon to replenish his wealth. Rais and two other defendants were condemned to death.
Élise Boehmer	Albert Pel	Montreuil	12 July 1884	14 August 1885	Pel was convicted of poisoning his mistress Élise Boehmer and then dismembering her body and destroying her remains in his furnace before her death could be discovered. He was also accused of murdering his first wife, Eugénie Buffereau, but was acquitted.
11 victims	Henri Désiré Landru	Paris	January 1915 – January 1919	November 1921	Ten World War I widows and one child who fell prey to the notorious lonely hearts killer. All evidence tying Landru to the victims was documentary. It is believed that he burned the bodies in a kitchen stove.
Pierre Quéméneur	Joseph Marie Guillaume Seznec	Between Finistère, Brittany and Paris	May 25–26, 1923	November 4, 1924	Wood merchant vanished during a business trip with the convict. Seznec's heirs continue to claim his innocence.
Christine Marlot, Jacqueline Weiss, Chantal Gras, Madeleine Dejust, Martine Renault, Françoise Lemoine, Bernadette Lemoine	Émile Louis	Yonne department, Burgundy	January 23, 1977 - March 1978	November 2004	Victims of serial killer Émile Louis, who lured, raped and murdered them. A gendarme investigation linked Louis to all seven victims, but crucial evidence was lost and Louis would not be prosecuted until he confessed to the murders in 2000 while imprisoned for rape. Louis later recanted, but was convicted of the murders in 2004. Two of the victims' bodies were recovered.
Christelle and Lucas Leroy	Bérenger Brouns	Paris	20 February 2005	27 February 2007	The woman and her young son were murdered in Paris in February 2005. Her lover Bérenger Brouns, a butcher, dismembered the bodies at Saint-Martin Market which were never found.
Fatima Saiah, Iryna Sytnyk, Cristina Bahulea, Zineb Chebout	Patrick Salameh	Marseille	May 7 – November 7, 2008	April 3, 2014 – October 22, 2015	Victims of serial killer "The Marseille Ripper" who kidnapped and raped women and murdered those who resisted. He was also convicted of raping a fifth woman, Soumia El Kandadi, who had seen the body of one of the victims at his house.
Fiona Chafoulais	Cécile Bourgeon, Berkhane Makhlouf	Clermont-Ferrand	May 12, 2013	December 16, 2020	5-year-old Fiona Chafoulais was reported missing by her mother, Cécile Bourgeon, and her mother's partner, Berkhane Makhlouf, who claimed she was abducted by strangers. They later confessed that she was beaten to death, blaming each other for the crime, but neither was able to lead police to her grave. After four trials, both were eventually convicted of murder.
Narumi Kurosaki	Nicolás Zepeda Contreras	Besançon	December 5, 2016	April 12, 2022	Japanese student who disappeared while studying in France. Her Chilean ex-boyfriend was convicted after it was found that he had left traces of her blood on the door while exiting her room, recorded a video talking about his intent to punish Narumi for disobeying him, lied to friends about his movements on the night and asked about how to kill people through suffocation.
Estelle Mouzin	Monique Olivier	Guermantes	January 9, 2003	December 19, 2023	Nine-year-old girl kidnapped and murdered by pedophilic serial killer Michel Fourniret. Fourniret confessed to the crime but died before he could be prosecuted. As such, his ex-wife Monique Olivier (who also claimed involvement) was tried for complicity in the murder and sentenced to life imprisonment.
Delphine Jubillar	Cedric Jubillar	Cagnac-les-Mines	December 15, 2020	October 17, 2025	Delphine Jubillar disappeared on the night of 15–16 December 2020 after an argument with her husband Cedric. He claimed she had left after an argument about her adultery, but the couple's son had seen them fighting on the night and her glasses were found smashed into pieces in the living room. He had also told his mother that he would kill Delphine and bury her where her body would not be found. In October 2025 a jury found him guilty of murder. Cedric later confessed to the crime and led police to Delphine's body in July 2026.

== Germany ==
Victim(s)	Convicted	Location	Disappeared	Conviction date	Description
21 victims	Fritz Haarmann, Hans Grans	Hannover	September 27, 1918 – June 5, 1924	December 19, 1924	Part of at least 24 teenage boys lured to Haarmann's apartment, where they were raped, murdered and dismembered. Their remains were mostly thrown in the Leine river, although suspicion exists that Haarmann sold the flesh of his victims as pork in the black market. Although very few of the human remains recovered from the river could be identified or connected to Haarmann, several belongings of the victims were found in possession of Haarmann, Grans, or other people who had purchased or received them as gifts from Haarmann. Both accused were sentenced to death, but Grans's sentence was reduced to 12 years in prison on retrial, in 1926.
Annemarie Schröder, Anna-Maria Kieferle	Arwed Imiela	Marienuchter	December 1968	May 24, 1973	The first victims of serial killer Arwed Imiela, who would go on to kill two more women, all for financial reasons. A Lübeck court convicted him of all four murders on circumstantial evidence.
Rudolf Rupp	Matthias E., Hermine Rupp and her two daughters	Heinrichsheim, near Neuburg on the Danube, Bavaria	October 13, 2001	May 13, 2005	Farmer last seen driving from another home, where he had been drinking. Rupp's family and the boyfriend of one of his daughters were found guilty of his murder despite the absence of any evidence and numerous contradictions in the testimonies of the accused; the lack of a body was explained as the accused dismembering and feeding it to the victim's dogs. However, Rupp's car was fished out of the Danube in February 2009, with his body still in the driving seat and no sign of foul play. Another man, Ludwig H., had been charged with stealing Rupp's vehicle.

== Iceland ==
Victim(s)	Convicted	Locations	Disappeared	Conviction date	Description
Guðmundur and Geirfinnur Einarsson (no relation)	Sævar Ciesielski, Kristjan Vídar Vídarsson, Tryggvi Rúnar Leifsson, Albert Klahn Skaftason, Guðjón Skarphéðinsson, Erla Bolladóttir	Hafnarfjörður, Southwest, Capital Region, and Keflavik, Reykjanesbær, South, Southern Peninsula	26 January – 19 November 1974	1980	Two unrelated men who disappeared in different circumstances, ten months apart. Despite the lack of connection between the cases, six people were kept in solitary, drugged and subjected to water torture and sleep deprivation until they signed confessions to both murders. A new investigation was ordered in 2011. After 5 years of investigation, it was concluded by prosecutor Davið Þór, that 5 of 6 convicted were wrongfully convicted when the case was originally heard in court in 1980. the case brought back to court, on 13 and 14 September. Two weeks later, On 27 September 2018, it was ruled that the original conviction was an error brought forward with questionable methods and thus ruled that the five men previously convicted were not guilty of murder a Sævar Ciesielski, Kristjan Vídar Vídarsson, Tryggvi Rúnar Leifsson, Albert Klahn Skaftason, Guðjón Skarphéðinsson. Erla Bolladottir's conviction was not reopened since she was not originally convicted for murder rather for lying about who was guilty of the murders, Einar Bollason, Magnús Leópoldsson, Sigurbjörn Eiríksson or Valdimar Olsen. They were not convicted in the original court ruling.

== India ==
Victim(s)	Convicted	Locations	Disappeared	Conviction date	Description
Chekannur Maulavi	V. V. Hamsa	Edappal, Kerala	July 29, 1993	September 30, 2010	Progressive Islamic cleric abducted by two men in a car, outside his home. Nine other people were also charged but acquitted. Hamsa was acquitted on appeal in 2018 due to lack of evidence.
Jaswant Singh Khalra	Satnam Singh, Surinder Pal Singh, Jasbir Singh, Prithipal Singh, Jaspal Singh, Amarjit Singh	Amritsar, Punjab	September 6, 1995	November 18, 2005	Sikh human rights activist who disappeared after exposing widespread abuses by Punjabi police. Six Punjabi police officers were convicted of his abduction and murder in 2005.
Ashwini Bidre Gore	Abhay Kurundkar, Kundan Bhandari, Mahesh Phalnikar	Mumbai, Maharashtra	April 11, 2016	April 5, 2025 (Convicted)	Ashwini Bidre, an Assistant Police Inspector, was murdered on 11 April 2016 near Mumbai by senior Abhay Kurundkar, convicted in April 2025. Kurundkar received a life sentence for killing Bidre, who insisted on marrying him. Two others were also convicted for helping dispose of her body, still missing.
Ashwini Bidre Gore	Abhay Kurundkar, Kundan Bhandari, Mahesh Phalnikar	Mumbai, Maharashtra	April 11, 2016	April 21, 2025 (Given life sentence)	Ashwini Bidre, an Assistant Police Inspector, was murdered on 11 April 2016 near Mumbai by senior Abhay Kurundkar, convicted in April 2025. Kurundkar received a life sentence for killing Bidre, who insisted on marrying him. Two others were also convicted for helping dispose of her body, still missing.

== Republic of Ireland ==
Victim(s)	Convicted	Locations	Disappeared	Conviction date	Description
Robert Nairac	Liam Townson	Ravensdale, County Louth	15 May 1977	November 1977	Victim was a British Army captain who worked with the Special Reconnaissance Unit (military intelligence) during The Troubles. Abducted from a pub in Dromintee by Provisional IRA members and driven across the Irish border to a field in the Ravensdale Woods in the north of County Louth, where he was interrogated. Nairac was allegedly punched, kicked, pistol-whipped and hit with a wooden post, he was shot dead. He did not admit to his true identity. His body was never found; lurid rumours claimed it had been put through a meat grinder. Townson, an IRA member, was convicted of the murder after confessing to Gardaí (Republic of Ireland police) and received life imprisonment, being released after 13 years.

== Italy ==
Victim(s)	Convicted	Locations	Disappeared	Conviction date	Description
Giuseppe Di Matteo	Vincenzo Chiodo, Enzo Salvatore Brusca, Giuseppe Monticciolo	Altofonte, Sicily	November 23, 1993	1996	A 13-year-old boy kidnapped by mafiosi wanted to silence Di Matteo's father, Santino, the first collaborator (pentito) of the Sicilian Mafia with Italian justice. After almost two years of captivity, Di Matteo was strangled on January 11, 1996, and his body dissolved in acid. The mafiosi that carried out the killing were arrested in February 1996 and got reduced sentences in return for also becoming pentiti.

== Jamaica ==
Victim(s)	Convicted	Locations	Disappeared	Conviction date	Description
Clive "Lizard" Williams	Vybz Kartel, Shawn Storm Campbell, Kahira Jones, Andre St. John	Havendale, Kingston	August 16, 2011	March 13, 2014	Dancehall music artist Vybz Kartel and three co-defendants were convicted of killing associate Clive Williams and dismembering his corpse. Witness Lenard Chow testified that Williams had argued with Kartel at his house over a pair of missing guns, after which Kartel ordered Kahira Jones and Andre St. John to kill him. Texts between Kartel and one of his co-defendants in which they discussed cutting up Williams's body were presented at trial, as was an audio recording in which Kartel and Shawn Campbell discussed killing Williams. Their convictions were overturned in 2024 after an attempt to bribe the jurors at the original trial came to light.

== Japan ==
Victim(s)	Convicted	Locations	Disappeared	Conviction date	Description
Kumio Toraya, Takeshige Ogata, Shizumi Ogata, Rieko Ogata, Kazumi Ogata, Yuki Ogata, Aya Ogata	Futoshi Matsunaga, Junko Ogata	Kitakyushu, Fukuoka	February 1996 – June 1998	September 28, 2005	Matsunaga and his girlfriend Junko held Junko's family captive and tortured and killed them, alongside a blackmail victim named Kumio Toraya. The victims were dismembered, boiled, pulverised and thrown in the sea.

== Malaysia ==
Victim(s)	Convicted	Locations	Disappeared	Conviction date	Description
Datuk Sosilawati Lawiya, Kamaruddin Shamsuddin, Noorhisham Mohamad, Ahmad Kamil Abdul Karim	N. Pathmanabhan, T. Thilaiyalagan, R. Kathavarayan	Banting, Selangor	August 30, 2010	July 4, 2011	Second murder conviction without a body in Malaysia, and the first outside of Singapore. A cosmetics millionaire and her driver, banker, and lawyer went missing at the same time. The victims' blood and wristwatches were found at a farm in nearby Tanjung Sepat, at the property of local lawyer N. Pathmanabhan. It was determined that two farmhands (Thilaiyalagan and Kathavarayan) had murdered the victims, incinerated them, and thrown the ashes on a river under orders of Pathmanabhan. All three were sentenced to death.
Datuk Sosilawati Lawiya, Kamaruddin Shamsuddin, Noorhisham Mohamad, Ahmad Kamil Abdul Karim	R. Mathan	Banting, Selangor	August 30, 2010	July 4, 2011	The prosecution alleged that another of Pathmanabhan's farmhands, R. Mathan, had also taken part in the murders. Mathan stood trial alongside the other three and was also sentenced to death. However, in 2017 the Federal Court of Malaysia acquitted Mathan on appeal, finding that no evidence conclusively linked him to the crime.

== New Zealand ==
Victim(s)	Convicted	Location	Disappeared	Conviction date	Description
An unnamed newborn	William Henry Woodgate	Point Resolution, Marlborough Province	November 1876	December 1876	Woodgate was executed in January 1877 for the murder of his niece's newborn child. The case turned on the testimony of the niece and her sister, and whether the alleged infant had been separated from the mother's body according to the definition of infanticide at the time.
Mary Eileen Jones	George Cecil Horry	Auckland, North Island	July 1942	August 1951	No body was found, so Horry was not arrested until 1951, when the circumstantial evidence was deemed sufficient. He was released from prison in 1967; the death penalty had been restored in New Zealand in 1950, but it was not in force in 1942 (see Capital punishment in New Zealand).
Sven Höglin, Heidi Paakkonen	David Tamihere	Coromandel Peninsula, North Island	April 1989	December 1990	Swedish couple Heidi Paakkonen, 21, and her fiancé Sven Hoglin, 23, went missing while tramping in a Coromandel forest. Tamihere (b. 1953) was convicted of their murder in 1990 and sentenced to life imprisonment. Hoglin's body was found in 1991, providing evidence that contradicted some aspects of the Crown's case. Paakkonen's body has never been found.
Deane Fuller-Sandys	Stephen Stone, Gail Maney	Auckland, North Island	August 1989	March 1999	Auckland tyre-fitter Fuller-Sandys (aged 21) disappeared on August 21, 1989, en route to a fishing expedition. Ten years later (in 1999) Stone and Maney were found guilty of his drug-related murder. In 2024, the Court of Appeal quashed Maney and Stone's convictions, finding them to be victims of a miscarriage of justice.
Mark Roderique	Rex Haig	Jackson's Bay, South Island	February 13, 1994	November 9, 1995	Haig was found guilty of murdering Mark Roderique, a crew member on his fishing boat the Antares. Two other crew members testified that Haig killed Roderique and sunk him into the bay. Haig's conviction was quashed in 2006 after it was revealed that one of the prosecution witnesses had confessed to the murder.
Ben Smart, Olivia Hope	Scott Watson	Marlborough Sounds, South Island	January 1, 1998	May 1999	Smart and Hope were a young couple last seen accepting an invitation to sleep in a private vessel by a man, later identified as Watson, who was convicted of murdering them. He is believed to have disposed of the bodies in the ocean at an unknown location. Their remains have never been recovered.
Brett Hall	David Lyttle	Whanganui, North Island	May 2011	November 14, 2019	David Lyttle was convicted of murdering Brett Hall following a Mr. Big operation in which an undercover police officer pretending to be an organized crime boss persuaded him to confess to the murder. Lyttle's conviction was quashed in 2021 after it was revealed that CCTV, witness statements, and mobile data all disproved his confession, some aspects of which were said to be completely implausible, and that the police had hidden evidence that Hall was killed by a crime gang.
Michael McGrath	David Benbow	Christchurch, South Island	May 22, 2017	October 11, 2023	McGrath disappeared after being invited to Benbow's property. Crown prosecutors alleged that Benbow killed McGrath because McGrath had recently started a relationship with Benbow's ex-partner, Joanna Green.

== Philippines ==
Victim(s)	Convicted	Location	Disappeared	Conviction date	Description
Marijoy and Jacqueline Chiong	Francisco Juan Larrañaga, six other men	Cebu	July 16, 1997	February 3, 2004	Daughters of an alleged cartel member who was due to testify against his boss when they were abducted and never seen again. Authorities maintain that Larrañaga (who was in Quezon City at the time of the crime according to documentary evidence and the testimony of over thirty people) and six others abducted, raped and murdered the sisters, based solely on the word of a burglar who testified in return for immunity, did not know the accused, and was found to have lied about his own criminal record. This witness also claimed that one of the bodies was abandoned in a ditch, but the body found there did not belong to either of the sisters. All seven were sentenced to death, but the sentences were changed to life in prison when the Philippines abolished the death penalty in 2006. Larrañaga, as a dual Spanish-Filipino citizen, was allowed to serve his sentence in Spain from 2009, where he continues to claim his innocence.

== Portugal ==
Victim(s)	Convicted	Location	Disappeared	Conviction date	Description
Joana Cipriano	João and Leonor Cipriano	Figueira, Algarve	12 September 2004	2005	An eight-year-old girl last seen walking back to her house after running an errand at a local store. Her mother and uncle, whom she allegedly witnessed having sex, were the first defendants convicted of murder in Portugal without a body, based on their apparent confessions to the crime. Both have protested their innocence and alleged police misconduct; similarities to the disappearance of Madeleine McCann a short distance away in 2007 have been noted.

== Romania ==
Victim(s)	Convicted	Location	Disappeared	Conviction date	Description
Elodia Ghinescu	Christian Cioacă		6 September 2007	2013	Cioacă, a former cop, was sentenced to 22 years in jail for having murdered his wife, Elodia, after the DNA samples gathered from the couple's home were proved to belong to the missing wife. Elodia's body was never found and Cioacă never accepted the accusations.

== Russia ==
Victim(s)	Convicted	Location	Disappeared	Conviction date	Description
Valentina Shklyeva	Sergey Khalmetov	Perm, Perm Krai	30 September 2002	29 October 2024	Khalmetov met Shklyeva on a train and lured her to a forest, where he raped and strangled her to death. He then buried the body in a shallow grave, but when he confessed to the crime years later and was brought in to locate the body, he was unable to do so on multiple occasions. He later recanted his confession, but was nonetheless convicted and imprisoned.

== Singapore ==
Victim(s)	Convicted	Location	Disappeared	Conviction date	Description
Jenny Cheok Cheng Kid	Sunny Ang Soo Suan	Sisters' Islands, Singapore	27 August 1963	19 May 1965	On 27 August 1963, both part-time law student Sunny Ang and his bar waitress girlfriend Jenny Cheok went on a scuba diving trip near Sisters' Islands, Singapore (the waters around the area were known to be dangerous). Cheok disappeared at sea after making two dives that day. It was later investigated that Ang had allegedly killed her for her insurance, for which the coverage totalled up to $450,000. Sixteen months after Cheok's disappearance, Ang was arrested as a suspect and charged with murder. Ang was found guilty of murder and sentenced to death by a unanimous decision in one of Singapore's last jury trials before the local government abolished the jury system in 1970. Ang was executed on 6 February 1967. Cheok's body remains missing as of today.
Cui Yajie	Leslie Khoo Kwee Hock	A remote area nearby Gardens by the Bay, Singapore	12 July 2016	18 July 2019	On 12 July 2016, 48-year-old Leslie Khoo allegedly killed his 31-year-old girlfriend Cui Yajie, a Tianjin-born Chinese engineer, in his car during a heated argument nearby Gardens by the Bay. Khoo took the body to a remote forest in Lim Chu Kang where he burnt the body for three days before he was arrested. By the time Khoo took the police to where he burnt the body, there were only ashes and a few clumps of hair, along with a bra hook and pieces of burnt fabric (from Cui's dress). Khoo was found guilty of murder on 18 July 2019, and a month later, on 19 August 2019, 51-year-old Khoo was sentenced to life imprisonment.

== South Africa ==
Victim(s)	Convicted	Location	Disappeared	Conviction date	Description
Irene and Denise Jones	Peter Roy Barber	Pinetown	December 1973	28 September 1979	Irene Jones and her 12-year-old daughter Denise disappeared in December 1973. Irene was a mistress of Barber who often had violent arguments with him. Despite the fact that their bodies were never found, Barber was convicted of killing the Joneses and another woman named Cecilia Majola, and was hanged in 1980.
Frances Rasuge	William Nkuna	Temba, South Africa	27 August 2004	13 October 2005	Rasuge disappeared in Temba on August 27, 2004, having been last seen in the company of her boyfriend William Nkuna. Blood belonging to Rasuge, which Nkuna maintained was menstrual blood, was found in Nkuna's car, and Nkuna had withdrawn money from Rasuge's bank account and used her supposedly missing phone after she disappeared. Following Nkuna's conviction, Rasuge's skeleton was recovered from his home.
Nandi Mbizane	Zwelibanzi Zungu	Centurion, Gauteng	4 March 2012	November 2015	Nandi Mbizane was last seen alive when her ex-lover Zwelibanzi Zungu caught her in bed with Oliver Matlala and assaulted her. Forensic evidence was presented to show that Mbizane was dead, and Zungu perjured himself repeatedly while asserting his innocence.
Liyaquat "Lee" Mentoor	Onke Mashinini	Johannesburg, Gauteng	16 March 2018	13 September 2019	Three-year-old abducted and murdered while his mother was at work. Mentoor's blood was found at the home of his mother's boyfriend Onke Mashinini, who was found guilty and sentenced to life imprisonment.

== Spain ==
Victim(s)	Convicted	Location	Disappeared	Conviction date	Description
Holy Child of La Guardia	Alonso, Lope, García, Juan and Yosef Franco; Benito García, Moshe Abenamías	La Guardia, Kingdom of Toledo	1475-1487	November 16, 1491	Six conversos and two Jews were arrested by the Spanish Inquisition and confessed under torture to having murdered a Christian child in La Guardia as part of a magic ritual; at least five were burned at an auto-da-fé in 1491. Because of constant contradictions and legal irregularities, the fact that the child was never named, no body was found, no child disappearance or murder was reported in La Guardia around that time, and obvious similarities with other European blood libels and antisemitic legends, modern historians believe that neither crime nor child actually existed. It is believed that the process was a sham to incite the expulsion of all Jews from Spain, which was decreed four months later.
José María Grimaldos López	Gregorio Valero Contreras, León Sánchez Gastón	Osa de la Vega, Cuenca Province	August 20, 1910	May 25, 1918	A shepherd from nearby Tresjuncos who disappeared after an animal sale. His family accused local farm wardens Valero and Sánchez, who had a history of bullying Grimaldos, of murdering him to steal the money. The case was at first dismissed due to lack of evidence, but it was reopened in 1913 by a newly appointed examining magistrate, Emilio Isasa Echenique. Under Isasa's watch, Valero and Sánchez were arrested and extrajudicially tortured to make them confess. No body was found and the accused ended up claiming that they had fed it to pigs, then burned and ground all remains left. Each was sentenced to 18 years in prison. After Grimaldos was found alive in Mira in 1926, the Supreme Court overturned the sentence and started proceedings against those responsible for the 1913 investigation. Isasa could not be judged because of his sudden death, officially attributed to a heart attack but suspected of being a suicide.
Marta del Castillo Casanueva	Miguel Carcaño Delgado	Seville	January 24, 2009	October 17, 2011	A 17-year-old girl who disappeared after leaving home to talk with her ex-boyfriend, the convict. He was arrested on February 13 and confessed to the murder the next day. However, he soon recanted and produced several different versions of the murder and the fate of the body, which was never found. Carcaño was found guilty due to witness statements, blood and DNA evidence.
Julia Lamas, Maurici Font	Ramón Laso Moreno	Els Pallaresos, Tarragona Province	March 27, 2009	October 16, 2014	First murder conviction in Spain with no body, no organic remains, and no confession. Lamas was Laso's second wife (he was previously imprisoned for the murder of his first wife in 1988), and Font was the husband of Lamas's sister, who was also Laso's lover. Laso was the last person to see them alive and claimed that they had run away together to never come back. Although no trace of either was ever found, Laso was arrested and convicted for the murders after he was caught faking evidence intended to make people believe that the victims were alive. It is suspected that the bodies were buried in a land plot owned by Laso at the time, which was later expropriated to build a road.
Marta Calvo	Jorge Ignacio Palma	Valencia	November 7, 2019	July 2022	A 25-year-old Spanish woman disappeared from a house party and was never found. Serial killer Jorge Ignacio Palma was convicted of her murder and dismemberment.

== Sweden ==
Victim(s)	Convicted	Location	Disappeared	Conviction date	Description
Muath al-Kasasbeh	Osama Krayem	Raqqa, Syria	December 24, 2014	July 21, 2025	A Royal Jordanian Air Force pilot who was captured, imprisoned in a cage and burned alive by members of Islamic State during Jordan's intervention in the Syrian civil war. al-Kasasbeh's execution was depicted in a propaganda video released by IS the following month. His remains were initially buried at the site of his execution but were later moved to another location and never recovered. In 2025, a Swedish former member of Islamic State was prosecuted under universal jurisdiction for al-Kasasbeh's murder. Although he was not the killer, a court found that he had helped guard al-Kasasbeh before the murder and physically forced him into the cage where he was killed.

== Uganda ==
Victim(s)	Convicted	Location	Disappeared	Conviction date	Description
William Wandyaka	Edward Mpagi	Kyamabaale, Masaka, Uganda	June 1981	1982	Mpagi was wrongfully convicted of the murder of William Wandyaka, who was in fact still alive and in hiding. Wandyaka had framed Mpagi due to a long-standing dispute between their families. Despite multiple witnesses who could attest that Wandyaka was still alive, Mpagi remained on death row until 2000, when he received a presidential pardon.

== United Kingdom ==
Victim(s)	Convicted	Location	Disappeared	Conviction date	Description
William Harrison	John, Richard and Joan Perry	Chipping Campden, England	August 16, 1660	Spring 1661	A wealthy 70-year-old man last seen walking to Charingworth. After his hat, coat and neckband were found on the side of the road with a sharp cut and sprinkled in blood, his servant John Perry claimed that Perry's own brother and mother had murdered Harrison to rob him, and subsequently dumped the body in a pond. The pond was drained but no body was found. The Perrys then alternated between pleading guilt and innocence, until they were all found guilty and hanged. However, Harrison reappeared in 1662, claiming to have been abducted by Barbary pirates. It has been said that this case was the source of a mistaken view that without a body there could be no trial for murder in England.
William Moore	William Kidd	Indian Ocean	October 30, 1697	May 23, 1701	Privateer's gunner murdered at sea after making a disrespectful remark to Kidd, his captain.
John Davidson	Thomas Davidson	Hanwell, London, England	December 1933	September 1934	The eight-year-old son of the convict, who confessed to drowning him and burning his body on a rubbish tip. Davidson later changed his mind and claimed that he had merely found his body in the canal, and maintained this until his death.
Diana Rowden, Vera Leigh, Andrée Borrel, Sonia Olschanezky	Fritz Hartjenstein, Werner Rohde, Peter Straub, Emil Brüttel, Magnus Wochner, Franz Berg	Vosges Mountains, Nazi Germany	July – August 1944	June 1, 1946	Four SOE agents murdered and cremated at Natzweiler-Struthof concentration camp during the Second World War. Three accused were acquitted at trial while the others were variously sentenced to death or imprisonment.
Gay Gibson	James Camb	Atlantic Ocean, west coast of Africa	October 18, 1947	March 22, 1948	An actress who was on an ocean liner, the MV Durban Castle, when her dead body was pushed through the porthole of her cabin. According to James Camb, the man convicted of killing her, she died during consensual sex and in a panic he pushed her body through the porthole. He always denied killing her.
William, Donald and Amy McSwann; Archibald and Rosalie Henderson; Olive Durand-Deacon	John George Haigh	London	September 9, 1944 – February 19, 1949	August 10, 1949	Victims of con artist and serial killer John George Haigh, who dissolved the bodies in acid under the belief that he couldn't be prosecuted for murder without a corpse; the resulting liquified remains were disposed of in a manhole. There was ample documentary evidence tying him to his victims, however, and a search found remains of human fat, three gallstones and a couple of dentures in the vat he had used to dissolve the body of his last victim.
Stanislaw Sykut	Michail Onufrejczyk	Llandeilo, Wales	December 14, 1953	August 1954	Partner of the convict in the management of a farm rehabilitated by the Polish Resettlement Corps after World War II. Onufrejczyk, who had been previously denounced by Sykut for violence and was about to lose the farm as a result of legal action, offered wildly varying stories to explain his partner's sudden disappearance. He was convicted largely because of the finding of over 2000 blood stains in the passage leading from the farm's kitchen to the backyard, which Onufrejczyk claimed to be from rabbits he had skinned, but which were confirmed by tests to be human blood. Police believed that Onufrejczyk dismembered Sykut's body in the kitchen and fed the parts to the pigs. The ruling was cited as a precedent in later murder without a body cases in England and Wales.
Malika Maria de Fernandez	Peter Reyn-Bardt	Wilmslow, England	June 1961	December 1983	The estranged wife of the convict. When the bog body later known as the Lindow Woman was found in a bog behind his home in 1983, police questioned Reyn-Bardt, whose wife had been missing for over two decades. Reyn-Bardt, also believing that the partial body was that of his wife, admitted to have murdered her when she blackmailed him under threat of revealing his homosexuality. Afterward, he dismembered the body and buried the pieces in a trench leading to the bog. Carbon 14 dating later showed that the body was nearly 1,800 years old. While Malika's own body was not found, the detailed confession was enough to pronounce her husband guilty.
John Smith	William Taylor Thorburn	Cardiff, Wales	June 17, 1964	May 4, 1966	Thorburn was convicted of the killing of 52-year-old John Smith after pleading guilty and stating that he had killed him for having an affair with his wife. Thorburn claimed he threw the body into the River Taff but it was never found.
Jack McVitie	Reggie Kray, Charlie Kray, Freddie Foreman, Cornelius Whitehead, Ronald Bender, Christopher and Tony Lambrianou	Stoke Newington, England	October 29, 1967	March 4, 1969	Gangster working for the infamous Kray twins, Ronnie and Reggie. After failing to murder the Krays' business manager Leslie Payne, McVitie was stabbed to death by Reggie Kray. His body was disposed of in the English Channel. Eyewitness testimony from some of those present during the murder led to the convictions of Reggie Kray and several accomplices.
Muriel McKay	Nizamodeen and Arthur Hosein	London	December 29, 1969	October 6, 1970	The wife of Alick McKay, deputy of Rupert Murdoch, who was abducted from her home in Wimbledon. It is believed that the Hoseins intended to abduct Murdoch's wife Anna Murdoch (now dePeyster) and hold her for ransom, but that they mistook McKay for her after she used Murdoch's car to buy groceries. After several failed attempts to ransom her to McKay's family, the Hoseins were arrested and convicted to life in prison for her murder despite no trace of her being ever found.
Mary Yafi	Ali Abdullah Saleh Yafi	Newport, Wales	September 1, 1971	1972	Mary Yafi was killed by her husband who was quickly convicted of her killing despite her body having not been found.
Michelle Kirkwood	Stephen Michael Marley	Atlantic Ocean	September 15, 1973	December 12, 1973	Marley was convicted of killing 15-year-old stowaway Michelle Kirkwood on the ship SS Rotherham Castle, which was travelling between Cape Town and Southampton. Marley killed her and then threw her overboard. Kirkwood had been drunk and had broken a model ship of Marley's, and another stowaway then witnessed him tie a cord around her neck and kill her. The witness reported what she had seen to a motorist when the ship docked in Southampton and Marley was jailed despite Kirkwood's body being missing.
Patricia Allen, Jonathan Allen and Victoria Allen	Anthony John Allen	Salcombe, Devon	May 25–30, 1975	December 16, 2002	The victims were all members of the same family and the perpetrator was the father, who eradicated all records of their existence after they vanished in May 1975. The father had previously been convicted of bigamy and faking his own death, and never reported his family missing. His wife's VW car was later found in a car park in Salcombe with dingy oars protruding from the windows.
John Coughlan	Michael Topham	Glasgow, Scotland	1975	September 8, 1980	57-year-old family man Coughlan left home in 1975 and never returned. On 8 September 1980, a man was convicted of his murder after pleading guilty and admitting murdering him with a hammer and lead weight. He said that he killed Coughlan after he had caught him stealing paint from a building site they both worked at. Coughlan's body has never been found.
Terence Eve, Robert Brown, George and Terry Brett, Frederick Sherwood and Ronald Andrews	John Childs	London	November 1974 – October 1978	December 4, 1979	The six claimed victims of confessed hitman John Childs, who said he carried the killings on behalf of the other convicted, and that he dismembered and burned the bodies in his apartment's fireplace. No evidence ever existed besides Childs's testimony. Pinfold and MacKenney's convictions were overturned in 2003 after Childs was ruled to be a "pathological liar".
Terence Eve, Robert Brown, George and Terry Brett, Frederick Sherwood and Ronald Andrews	Terry Pinfold, Harry MacKenney	London	November 1974 – October 1978	November 28, 1980	Pinfold and Mackenney were jailed for life in November 1980 after being implicated in the murder by a former employee of the two men, Bruce Childs, who confessed to a series of contract killings. In 2003, the pair were cleared of the charges on appeal.
Renee and Andrew MacRae	William MacDowell	A9, south of Inverness, Scotland	November 12, 1976	September 29, 2022	Renee MacRae and her son disappeared on 12 November 1976. That night her car was found on fire in a lay-by south of Inverness but both Renee and Andrew were missing and never found. From the start the chief suspect was William MacDowell, a man who it was discovered was having an affair with MacRae. He was finally brought to trial and convicted in 2022 at the age of 80 and sentenced to a minimum of 30 years' imprisonment, but died only months later.
Robert Nairac	Liam Townson	Dromintee, Northern Ireland	May 14, 1977	November 1977	British Army Captain murdered by the IRA during the course of an undercover operation. It is believed that Nairac's body was buried in farmland in Ireland.
Robert Nairac	Gerard Fearon, Thomas Morgan	Dromintee, Northern Ireland	May 14, 1977	1978	British Army Captain murdered by the IRA during the course of an undercover operation. It is believed that Nairac's body was buried in farmland in Ireland.
Frances (or Francis) Rundle	Arthur David Rundle	South Norwood, Surrey, England	October 1978	5 July 1980	Arthur David Rundle was convicted of the murder of his wife. He said he killed her during a violent row at their home. Her remains were never discovered.
Monica Taylor	Peter Taylor	Boscombe, Bournemouth, England	April 3, 1982	March 19, 1993	Peter Taylor was convicted of murdering his wife Monica over a divorce settlement on the evidence of a man he had previously attempted to hire to kill his wife. He was also convicted of attempting to solicit an undercover police officer to murder his son-in-law.
Mark Tildesley	Leslie Bailey	Wokingham, England	June 1, 1984	December 9, 1992	A seven-year-old boy who disappeared while visiting a funfair in Wokingham, Berkshire. He was lured away from the fair and his bicycle was found chained to railings nearby. In 1990 it emerged that Mark had been abducted, drugged, tortured, raped and murdered by a London-based paedophile gang on the night he disappeared.
Carole Packman	Russell Causley	Bournemouth, England	1985	December 18, 1996; overturned in 2003; reconvicted upon retrial in 2004	Carole Packman went missing shortly after initiating a divorce with her husband (whose name was Russell Packman at the time; he changed his name to that of his mistress after Carole's disappearance). Initially, police investigated the possibility that Causley murdered his wife, but closed the investigation when sufficient evidence was not forthcoming. Years later, when Causley was discovered to have faked his own death in an attempted life insurance scheme, police reopened the investigation, which led to Causley's first conviction. Packman's disappearance became the subject of the 2016 television series The Investigator: A British Crime Story.
Helen McCourt	Ian Simms	Billinge, Merseyside, England	February 9, 1988	March 1989	A 22-year-old woman last seen walking towards the pub owned by the convict, who had previously made rejected advances on her, and had also banned her from the pub after she had an argument with another patron. Forensic evidence included McCourt's blood found in Simms's car; a plastic binfold left by a river, that contained McCourts's clothes, hair and a flex with toothmarks that were matched to one of Simms' dogs; and a set of clothes and two towels, property of Simms and sprinkled with McCourt's blood, that were found abandoned near the Manchester Ship Canal.
Laura May Al-Shatanawi	Hassan Shatanawi	Hartlepool, County Durham, England	June 1993	October 1994	Laura May Al-Shatanawi disappeared in June 1993. Her husband did not report her missing for a month, and after he appeared on television supposedly appealing for information a man told police that he had been asked by the husband to burn a garden shed he had just bought for his allotment at the same time Laura went missing. The shed was recovered and her blood and parts of her scalp were found on its floor. The husband was convicted of her murder and it is believed he killed her to hide his affair.
Janice Wood	Michael Sagar	Bradford, England	August 22, 1994	November 24, 1995	A 36-year-old mother of two who was shot dead with a shotgun by her former lover. Her body was never found but her blood and parts of a human liver were found in the man's car.
Jane Harrison	Kevin Doherty	Wood Green Shopping City, London, England	June 15, 1995	January 29, 2013	A 32-year-old woman who disappeared while shopping for a holiday she was due to take with her partner in two days time. The partner, who claimed she had run off with another man, was soon questioned about the disappearance and was convicted of her killing in 2013 after it was heard that he had made two false phone calls to himself pretending to speak to Harrison after her disappearance.
Theresa Shephard	Peter Turner	Sheffield, England	July 1995	July 26, 1996	25-year-old Shephard disappeared after going to meet a man in Sheffield. Her ex-boyfriend was convicted of her murder, since her blood was found in his car and he had a clear motive to kill her, as she was due to give evidence against him in an upcoming assault trial.
Allison McGarrigle	Charles O'Neill and William Lauchlan	Rothesay, Isle of Bute, Scotland	June 20, 1997	June 10, 2010	McGarrigle disappeared after arguing with two paedophiles and threatening to tell police about their abuse of a child. The two men were convicted of her murder in 2010.
Gracia Morton	Michael Morton	Notting Hill, London, England	November 12, 1997	August 1, 2005	A 40-year-old woman who vanished after visiting her estranged husband Michael Morton's home to discuss their daughter's schooling. They were known to have then argued about the matter. Her case was featured on Crimewatch, and Michael Morton was finally convicted in 2005.
Arlene Fraser	Nat Fraser	Elgin, Scotland	April 28, 1998	January 29, 2003, May 30, 2012	A woman murdered by her husband, who maintains innocence of the crime. He was given a new trial in 2012, but he was convicted.
Surjit Athwal	Bachan Kaur Athwal and Sukhdave Singh Athwal	Punjab, India	December 1998	July 26, 2007	A woman killed in a so-called "honour killing" on the orders of her 70-year-old mother-in-law acting in acted in collusion with Surjit's husband. Although she was killed in India, the pair were tried and convicted in a British court in 2007 in what was the first conviction in a British court of an honour killing committed outside the UK. Her body has never been found, but police determined she was killed after her mother-in-law and husband discovered she was having an affair and wanted a divorce.
Tulay Goren	Mehmet Goren	Woodford Green, London, England	January 7, 1999	December 17, 2009	A 15-year-old Muslim schoolgirl who was murdered by her father in a so-called "honour killing". He had disapproved of a relationship she had with an older man who was from a different branch of the Islamic religion. He would not be convicted until 2009.
Debbie Griggs	Andrew Griggs	Kent, England	May 5, 1999	October 28, 2019	Debbie had not been seen alive since she disappeared from her family home in Deal, Kent, on 5 May 1999. Andrew Griggs was an initial suspect in the Police's investigation into her disappearance; however, the Crown Prosecution Service found in 2003 the evidence submitted to them offered "no realistic prospect of conviction". A new investigation began in 2018 upon which Andrew was later charged and found guilty of her murder following a trial held at Canterbury Crown Court. Mr Griggs was handed a life sentence with a minimum tariff of 20 years. In 2022, her remains were found buried in a back garden in Dorset, England.
Adam Alexander	Thomas Pryde	Errol, Scotland	November 14, 1999	March 25, 2010	In 2010 businessman Thomas Pryde was convicted of the murder of lorry driver Adam Alexander, after Pryde confessed that he had killed him after a row about a business deal. Pryde had told police where he had buried Alexander after his arrest in 2008, but searches failed to find the remains before the trial. In 2012, Alexander's remains were finally located.
Margaret Fleming	Edward Cairney and Avril Jones	Inverkip, Inverclyde, Scotland	December 1999 or January 2000	June 2019	Edward Cairney and Avril Jones became carers for Margaret Fleming following the death of her father in 1995. In 2016 Jones made a new benefits application in Fleming's name which raised concerns. A large-scale police search was unable to locate Fleming and it was discovered the last independent sighting of her was in December 1999 when she was aged 19. Throughout the investigation and trial the couple maintained that Fleming was alive and had left Scotland for London in January 2000.
Don Banfield	Shirley Banfield and Lynette Banfield	Wealdstone, London, England	May 13, 2001	April 3, 2012	63-year-old Banfield was last seen leaving his family home in May 2001. His wife and daughter were convicted of his murder in 2012 after it was determined that they financially gained from the sale of his home and lied about seeing him in 2008 in order to fraudulently claim his pension. Their convictions were later quashed on appeal in 2013, even though they had pled guilty to fraud, forgery and perverting the course of justice and the defence saying that the "likelihood" was that "one or other" had murdered him. This was because they had been convicted under joint enterprise and judges ruled there was insufficient evidence to prove that both had acted together to kill him.
Danielle Jones	Stuart Campbell	East Tilbury, England	June 18, 2001	December 19, 2002	The convict's 15-year-old niece disappeared while walking to a bus stop. A pair of stockings with blood from both Jones and Campbell, and lip gloss used by Jones were found in Campbell's apartment. In addition, Campbell claimed to have received a text message from Jones after she disappeared, but it didn't match Jones's texting style, and Mobile Switching Center records showed that both Campbell's and Jones's cell phones were in the same place when the message was sent.
Jason Martin-Smith	Mark Searle	Hastings, England	August 21, 2001	August 21, 2015	28-year-old Martin-Smith disappeared from Hastings at a time when he was receiving threats from other men after informing police that they had been involved in a burglary. Long-time suspects Mark Searle and Steve McNichol were convicted of the abduction and murder of Martin-Smith on the 15-year anniversary of his disappearance, after more witnesses came forward to report that the men had been seen dismembering a body in lock-up the day after he vanished.
Belinda Gibson	David Gibson, Leslie Gibson	Southampton, Hampshire, England	February 16, 2002	July 2004	Both were convicted of murdering David's wife Belinda, who disappeared in 2002. David later admitted disposing of her body in the Solent.
Jonathan Dalton	Stuart Martin	Milton Keynes, England	February 25, 2002	December 16, 2004	42-year-old Stuart Martin was convicted of the killing of his 22-year-old colleague Jonathan Dolton in December 2004. He had fled the country the day after Dalton's disappearance and went on the run, before being extradited to stand trial.
Linda Razzell	Glyn Razzell	Swindon, Wiltshire	March 19, 2002	November 2003	Linda Razzell disappeared on her way to work at Swindon College. Traces of her blood were later discovered in the boot of a car which her estranged husband had borrowed from a friend, although they were initially overlooked by the forensics team. In 2018 a BBC Two documentary Conviction, reviewed the case, and considered a possible link to a convicted serial killer, Christopher Halliwell.
Tina Baker	Martin Baker	Sunbury-on-Thames, Surrey	July 8, 2002	November 16, 2006	Tina Baker was last seen on 8 July 2002 after saying she was going to feed the animals on her and her husband's farm. Her pet dog was later found abandoned nearby. Police soon became suspicious of her husband and he was convicted of her murder in 2006. His first wife testified at his trial that he had previously threatened to kill her and feed her to the pigs when they were getting divorced, and evidence put him close to the farm on the day. The motive for the murder appeared to be that he feared he was going to lose the £100,000 14-acre farm.
Ravinder and Devinder Chohan	William Horncy and Kenneth Regan	Hounslow, London	February 15, 2003	July 1, 2005	Main article: Chohan family murders Horncy and Regan were convicted of murdering the entire Chohan family, including the infant children Ravinder and Devinder, whose bodies have never been found. A third defendant, Peter Rees, was convicted of murdering the children's father Amarjit Chohan but acquitted of the other murders.
Charlotte Pinkney	Nicholas Rose	Ilfracombe, Devon, England	February 28, 2004	January 2005	Pinkney disappeared after leaving a party, and six days later her handbag were found in undergrowth near Ilfracombe. Scaffolder and attendee of the party Nicholas Rose was convicted of her murder after her blood was found in his car and on his shoes. Her boot was also found a minute from his home.
Chantel Taylor	Stephen Wynne	Birkenhead, Merseyside, England	May 2004	January 25, 2006	27-year-old sex worker Taylor disappeared in May 2004. Client Stephen Wynne confessed to her murder in 2006 after he was arrested for setting fire to a mosque, revealing he had killed her with a meat cleaver and had dismembered her body. Although he was convicted, her body has not been found.
Michelle Gunshon	Martin Stafford	Digbeth, Birmingham, England	December 2004	July 31, 2012	38-year-old Gunshon disappeared while staying at a pub in Digbeth. An employee at the pub with a history of violence and sex offences, Martin Stafford, soon became a suspect after he was caught on speed cameras driving the victim's car in the aftermath of her disappearance, before it was found abandoned. He fled to his native Ireland afterwards but was extradited and convicted of her murder in 2012.
Janet Brown	Donald Graham	Hexham, Northumbria, England	June 15, 2005	June 20, 2014	Brown vanished in June 2005 but it would not be until 2010 that her disappearance was discovered and a fraud investigation was launched, after suspicious activity was found on her bank accounts. After she went missing up to £400,000 was transferred from her account to the account of her lover, Donald Graham, and it was found she had also inexplicably transferred a large amount to him on the day she was last seen alive in 2005. Graham was convicted on her murder in 2014.
Jenny Nicholl	David Hodgson	Richmond, North Yorkshire, England	June 30, 2005	February 19, 2008	The 19-year-old mistress of the convict, a 45-year-old married father of two, with whom she had been having an affair for five years. Nicholl also had a relationship with Hodgson's older brother, which Police considered the motive of the murder. Hodgson was sentenced to life with a minimum of 18 years.
Li Hua Cao	Robert Ekaireb	Hampstead, London, England	October 23, 2006	December 19, 2013	Li Hua Cao went missing from the house she shared with her husband. She had become unhappy with her marriage and had spoken to doctors about terminating her pregnancy. The husband, Robert Ekaireb, had previously assaulted his pregnant wife and was convicted of her murder in 2013.
Paige Chivers	Robert Ewing	Blackpool, England	August 23, 2007	July 10, 2015	Vulnerable 15-year-old child Paige Chivers was reported missing from Blackpool in August 2007. 60-year-old Robert Ewing was convicted of killing her in 2015 after it was heard he had an "inappropriate sexual interest" in the child and that spots of her blood were found in the flat Ewing lived in at the time. Ewing died in 2022 without revealing where the body is.
Katie Prout	Adrian Prout	Redmarley, Gloucestershire, England	November 5, 2007	February 2010	Katie Prout was murdered by her husband, who was convicted of her murder despite her body not being found and the husband claiming his innocence. This claim would be proven to be a lie in 2011 when he confessed to the murder and led police to where he had buried her.
Susan Rushworth	Stephen Griffiths	Bradford, England	June 22, 2009	December 21, 2010	Sex worker Susan Rushworth disappeared from Bradford in June 2009. In 2010 it was revealed that she had become a victim of serial killer Stephen Griffiths, who killed two other sex workers in the city. Griffiths told police he had murdered her and her blood was later found in his flat. He was convicted of murdering all three women on 21 December 2010, although Rushworth's body was never found.
Jesse Richards	Kevin John Huston, Matthew Robert Taylor, Joseph Doe	Cleeve Prior, Worcestershire, England	July 2009	April 19, 2012	A father-of-three killed due to a drugs debt. Five men admitted being responsible for his killing but his body was never found.
Thomas Groome	Jason Thaxter	Thorne, South Yorkshire, England	January 1, 2010	December 19, 2016	Thaxter was convicted of the murder of Thomas Groome six years after his disappearance. His mother had previously been convicted of manslaughter after pleading guilty, having also been found guilty of defrauding Groome. She said there was a man present at the killing but refused to reveal who this was. In 2016 her son Jason was identified as this man and convicted of Groome's murder.
Emma Ward	Nicky Ward	Rockland St Peter, England	March 2010	April 2011	Murdered by her husband, who claimed that she had left him for another man. He later admitted the crime but claimed to have no memory of it.
Suzanne Pilley	David Gilroy	Edinburgh, Scotland	May 4, 2010	March 15, 2012	A woman believed to have been murdered by her ex-boyfriend. Evidence cited by the prosecution included scratches on Gilroy's body, that he stopped sending frequent text messages to Pilley the day she disappeared, an unjustified roundabout trip of Gilroy's car to the other extreme of Scotland on the same day and the fact that the car was later cleaned.
Lynda Spence	Colin Coats and Philip Wade	Glasgow, Scotland	April 14, 2011	April 8, 2013	Spence was killed by the offenders after she failed to pay back money she owed to them. Her blood was found in a flat of an associate, which had also been extensively cleaned, and a friend testified being suspicious of the pair trying to "get rid of something" from a boat. Coats later confessed to a fellow inmate that he put her body in a furnace.
Paul Morson	Ray Brierley and John Burns	St Helens, Merseyside, England	June 8, 2011	November 23, 2012	Morson was a car dealer who had previously been imprisoned. His former business partners were convicted of his murder, which was motivated by a drugs dispute. One of the men admitted killing him and said he dumped him in the Manchester Ship Canal, although he continues to claim the killing was "self-defence".
Unidentified Taliban insurgent	Alexander Blackman	Helmand Province, Afghanistan	September 15, 2011	November 8, 2013	Three Royal Marines were charged with murder after a video emerged of the summary execution of a wounded Taliban insurgent by Alexander Blackman (referred to in court as Marine A). Two of the defendants, Marine B and Marine C, were acquitted, but Blackman was convicted of murder, later downgraded to manslaughter due to diminished responsibility. The identity of the insurgent and the location of the body are unknown.
Alethea Taylor	John Taylor	Orleton, Herefordshire, England	January 2012	April 2, 2013	Alethea Taylor was ruled to have been murdered by her husband, who was having an affair at the time. The husband falsely claimed she had dementia and wandered off, and also lied about having tried to repeatedly call her after she disappeared. Her blood was also found in their home.
Claire Holland	Darren Osment	Bristol, England	June 6, 2012	December 11, 2023	Claire Holland, aged 32, disappeared on June 6, 2012 after leaving the Seamus O'Donnell's pub in Bristol, England. It was later discovered that she had been murdered by her former partner, Darren Osment. Osment was convicted after he had confessed to numerous people that he had murdered Holland, including an undercover police officer. Holland's body has never been found and it is believed that Osment disposed of her body in water.
April Jones	Mark Bridger	Machynlleth, Wales	October 1, 2012	May 30, 2013	A five-year-old girl murdered in 2012. The convict stated he had deposited the body in both the Afon Dulas and River Dovey, although authorities presume the remains are near the man's home.
Charlotte Murray	Johnny Miller	Moy, County Tyrone, Northern Ireland	October 31, 2012	October 8, 2019	Charlotte Murray was last heard from on Halloween 2012, when she emailed explicit pictures of herself and another man to her ex-boyfriend, Johnny Miller. Miller claimed Murray was still alive and had sent him text messages from Belfast after she disappeared, but mobile data showed that he had been using her phone to send the messages himself. Miller was found guilty of murder in 2019.
Lisa Bennett	Kathleen Salmond and Kevin Flanagan	Birmingham, England	May 19, 2013	December 13, 2019	Bennett was killed by homeless couple Kathleen Salmond and Kevin Flanagan, who then continued to claim her benefits. Flanagan admitted benefit fraud and preventing a burial. The prosecution said that they put Bennett's body in a wheelie bin which was later incinerated at a waste disposal facility.
Rania Alayed	Ahmed Al-Khatib	Salford, Greater Manchester	June 7, 2013	June 4, 2014	25-year-old mother Alayed was never seen again after 17 June 2013, the same day that she had gone to her brother-in-law's house at the instigation of her husband. The husband, Ahmed Al-Khatib, was convicted of her murder a year later in what was a suspected "honour killing", carried out as Al-Khatib believed she had become too Westernized. Al-Khatib said at his trial that he had become unhappy when his wife started college and started wearing make-up. He confessed to killing her, although her body was not found.
Farah Boscolo-Gnolo	Federica Boscolo-Gnolo	Russell Square, London, England	January 2015	13 April 2016	The convict was a mentally ill Italian woman who was visiting London in January 2015. She admitted to having suffocated her two-month-old daughter but the body was not found.
Sylvia Stuart	Ali Qazimaj	Weybread, Suffolk, England	May – June 2016	March 2017	Qazimaj was convicted of murdering Sylvia and her husband Peter, whose body was found in a nearby marsh, after blood and hair matching their DNA profiles was found in his car.
Patricia "Patti" Henry	George Metcalff	Girvan, South Ayrshire, Scotland	November 13, 2017	October 7, 2021	Henry was a 46-year-old mother who was raped, assaulted and killed in her flat by 67-year-old pensioner George Metcalff. They had lived in the same block of flats since 2008. The pair made 143 calls to each other between 1 November and 13 November 2017, but Metcalff never contacted her again after 13 November and she disappeared. He made several late night trips to the victim's flat following her murder. He was convicted in 2021 despite her body never having been found. He was also convicted of two rapes committed in 1971 and 2004.
Julie Reilly	Andrew Wallace	Govan, Glasgow, Scotland	February 6, 2018	February 4, 2019	Wallace pleaded guilty to killing and dismembering Reilly in February 2019. Only two human femurs believed to have belonged to Reilly were recovered buried near Wallace's home.
Sarah Wellgreen	Ben Lacomba	Kent, England	October 9, 2018	October 28, 2019	A 46-year-old mother of five murdered in 2018. Lacomba was her ex-partner who was convicted after a four-week trial at Woolwich Crown Court and was handed a life sentence with a 27-year minimum tariff to serve. Kent Police report that the search for Sarah's body is the largest search conducted in the force's history.
Joy Morgan	Shohfah-El Israel	Ilford, London	December 26, 2018	August 5, 2019	University student Morgan was last seen at a church celebration in Ilford on 26 December 2018. Two days later on 28 December her name was removed from a "church social media chat group". It was not until 7 February 2019 that concerned flatmates reported her missing. Two days later a man who attended the same church as Morgan was arrested and Morgan's keys were found in his car. It was later found that her phone had been detected in his car on 28 December, most likely as he attempted to dispose of her body. The man, Shohfah-El Israel, was convicted of her murder on 5 August 2019, but he refused to reveal the location of her body. Two months after the conviction her body was found in woodland near Stevenage.
Michael (Mike) O'Leary	Andrew Jones	Carmarthen, Wales	January 27, 2020	October 19, 2020	Jones lured O'Leary, a man his wife was having an affair with, to a remote farm in January 2020 and killed him with a shotgun before burning his body. Although his body was not found, O'Leary's blood and part of his intestine was found at the farm. Jones had used O'Leary's phone to text his loved ones pretending he had killed himself, but the messages did not match his texting style. The case featured on the ITV documentary No Body Recovered.
Leah Ware	Mark Brown	Hastings	7 May 2021	1 December 2022	Leah Ware was an escort living out of a shipping container on Little Bridge Farm, which was owned by her boyfriend Mark Brown. She was last seen alive on 6 May 2021 when she met a male friend; her phone disappeared from the network the following day. Police became aware of Leah's disappearance while investigating the murder of Brown's second partner, Alexandra Morgan, and found that Brown had bought six litres of petrol on the day she disappeared, and after she disappeared had withdrawn money from her bank account, rehomed one of her pet dogs, and drowned the other in a pond.
Bernadette Walker	Scott Walker	Peterborough, Cambridgeshire	July 18, 2020	September 10, 2021	Scott Walker was found guilty of murder and perverting the course of justice and was jailed for life, Bernadette's mother was also imprisoned for six years for perverting the course of justice. Bernadette, from Peterborough, disappeared in July 2020, and is presumed dead as her body has never been found. Scott died in prison on 22 December 2023.
Frank McKeever	Surie Suksiri, Juned Sheikh	Highbury, London	August 28, 2021	November 20, 2023	McKeever disappeared while visiting his stepdaughter Surie Suksiri in Highbury in August 2021. The last time he was seen alive was in a 47-second video clip in which he was forced to admit to sexually assaulting Suksiri when she was six, which Suksiri sent to her boyfriend's sister on WhatsApp. Suksiri and her boyfriend Juned Sheikh were convicted of McKeever's murder in November 2023.
Maureen Gitau	Mark Moodie	Deptford, London	December 5, 2022	November 17, 2023	Maureen Gitau was reported missing by her family on 10 December 2022 after they had not seen her for five days. She had last been seen leaving her aunt's birthday party to meet caretaker Mark Moodie. CCTV showed that Moodie had taken Gitau to a block of flats where he worked, which she never left alive. Moodie was later seen moving a communal waste bin down to the basement before sending it to a processing plant where the contents were incinerated. Gitau's body is believed to have been concealed in the waste bin. Moodie was convicted of her murder in November 2023.
Fiona Holm	Carl Cooper	Catford, London	June 20, 2023	June 28, 2024	Fiona Holm was last seen in June 2023. Her abusive partner, Carl Cooper, was found guilty of her murder and that of another woman, Naomi Hunte. During the trial Cooper tried to suggest that Fiona was still alive and had been kidnapped by Hamas.

== United States ==
Victim(s)	Convicted	Location	Disappeared	Conviction date	Description
Russell Colvin	Jesse Boorn, Stephen Boorn	Manchester, Vermont	May 10, 1812	November 1819	Farmhand Colvin went missing in 1812. Brothers Jesse and Stephen Boorn had been seen arguing with him before he disappeared and some of his personal effects were found buried in a cellar on the Boorn farm alongside bones claimed to be human but later found to be animal. Both made contradictory confessions to the crime, although Jesse recanted his. The brothers were sentenced to death for the alleged crime, but were pardoned and released the following year after Colvin was found alive in Dover, New Jersey.
Priscilla Rulloff	Edward H. Rulloff	Lansing, New York	June 23, 1844	1858	The convict's infant daughter disappeared along with her mother. Rulloff was suspected of murdering both, but he was only tried and sentenced to ten years for the kidnapping of his wife. Upon his release in 1856, he was charged, tried and convicted for the murder of his daughter, but he escaped and was acquitted on appeal in 1859. Rulloff was hanged for an unrelated murder in 1870.
Oliver Watts, Smith Watts, George Burr	Albert W. Hicks	The Narrows	March 1860	July 1860	Hicks murdered his three crewmates aboard the A.E. Johnson and threw their bodies in the sea. They were never found, but their deaths were given away by large amounts of blood found on the ship. Multiple witnesses had seen Hicks carrying the ship's bag, in which he had stowed stolen valuables, and the victim's possessions were found in his boarding house.
William Druse	Roxana Druse, Mary Druse	Warren, New York	December 18, 1884	September 1885	Druse murdered her husband and burned his body during a domestic dispute, forcing her children and nephew to help under threat of death. Her nephew later confessed his role and was spared prosecution in return for his testimony. Druse was hanged in 1887 while her daughter was sentenced to life imprisonment for her role in the murder.
George Watkins	Charles Hudspeth	Marion County, Arkansas	1886	1888-1892	Watkins disappeared a year after moving to Marion County with his wife, who had an affair with Hudspeth. After their arrest, the wife accused Hudspeth of murdering Watkins so they could marry each other. Hudspeth was found guilty in an 1888 trial that was overturned, but was found guilty again on retrial in 1892, and executed later that year. Watkins was allegedly found alive in Kansas in 1893, but this story was found to be a hoax. It was also reported that he had been convicted mainly because he had been in possession of the victim's stolen belongings.
Louisa Luetgert	Adolph Luetgert	Chicago, Illinois	May 1, 1897	February 9, 1898	Bone fragments were found in the furnace at a sausage factory owned by Luetgert, alongside a ring enscribed with the victim's initials.
Eli Feasel	Charles Hutchinson, Nannie Hutchinson	Bostwick, Nebraska	November 1, 1903	October 11, 1904	Feasel disappeared from his farm in 1903. His housekeeper Nannie Hutchinson and her son Charles were arrested for his murder but released for lack of evidence. The following year, the new farmer found what appeared to be a recently opened grave containing a severed hand and clothing belonging to Eli Feasel. The day before, Charles Hutchinson had rented a buggy which he later returned smelling of decomposed flesh, leading to suspicion that he and his mother had dug up Feasel's body and moved it using the buggy after seeing the new farmer ploughing the field where it was buried. Charles and his mother were both found guilty of second-degree murder.
Jenny Wilson and 19-month-old daughter	Bill Wilson	Blount County, Alabama	1908	December 18, 1915	Wilson was convicted of murdering his wife, Jenny Willson, and their 19-month-old daughter. Bones presented by the prosecution in court were later discovered to be those of at least four or five people, likely Indians. Wilson received a formal pardon from the Alabama governor after his wife and daughter were discovered to be living in Vincennes, Indiana in 1918.
Rev. James Smith	Rev. Ernest Lyons	Nansemond County, Virginia	July 31, 1908	April 3, 1912	Lyons was convicted of second degree murder following the disappearance of Smith, with whom he had been seen quarrelling, and the discovery of a body in the Nansemond River which matched Smith's description. Lyons was sentenced to 18 years' imprisonment, but in 1912, a friend of his discovered that Smith was alive and living in North Carolina. Lyons was subsequently pardoned by Governor William Hodges Mann.
John Hoffman (Note: Some sources give his first name as William)	Billy Gohl, John Klingenberg	Aberdeen, Washington	December 23, 1909	May 12, 1910	A sailor who was robbed and killed by Gohl and Klingenberg after having witnessed another murder committed by Gohl. His body was weighted down and thrown into Grays Harbor; a human skeleton was recovered from the Harbor two months after the trial, but it is not known if this was Hoffman.
Mary Vickery	Condy Dabney	Coxton, Kentucky	1925	1926	Dabney was convicted of murder and sentenced to life imprisonment. The following year, the supposed murder victim was found to still be alive and Dabney was "immediately pardoned". Marie Jackson, the chief witness for the prosecution at Dabney's trial, was subsequently convicted of perjury and sentenced to five years in prison.
Walter Collins	Sarah Northcott	Los Angeles, California	March 10, 1928	December 21, 1928	A presumed victim of the Wineville Chicken Coop murders led by Gordon Stewart Northcott. Northcott's mother and accomplice pleaded guilty to killing Collins, but later recanted. Collins' remains were never located and his mother always refused to believe he was dead.
Topsy Warren	Louise Butler, George Yelder	Lowndes County, Alabama	April 1928	April 24–25, 1928	Butler and Yelder were convicted of murder and sentenced to life in prison for the alleged slaying of Yelder's fourteen-year-old niece on the testimony of Butler's daughter and niece, who claimed to have seen them dismembering Warren and disposing of her remains in the river, and a recanted confession by Butler. Within a week Warren was found to be alive and staying with relatives and Butler and Yelder were pardoned and released.
Grace Budd	Albert Fish	New York City	May 28, 1928	March 1935	A nine-year-old girl abducted by Fish after he lied to her parents about taking her to another child's birthday party. In a 1934 letter to Budd's mother, Fish claimed that he killed the girl on June 3 and ate her whole body over the course of nine days. Fish was executed in 1936.
Thora Chamberlain	Thomas Henry McMonigle	Campbell, California	November 2, 1945	1946	A 14-year-old girl abducted outside her high school. Evidence included a bullet hole and blood stains in the car of the convict, objects belonging to Chamberlain found buried in the convict's workplace, and two pairs of socks belonging to Chamberlain being found on the sea cliff where he confessed to have disposed of the body. McMonigle was executed in 1948.
Wilson Turner	John Wallace, Henry Mobley, Herring Sivell, Tom Strickland	Greenville, Georgia	April 1948	1948	Wallace and his accomplices pursued Turner from Meriwether County into Coweta County, where Wallace pistol-whipped him to death before taking him back into Meriwether County and burning his body. Human bone fragments and brain tissue was recovered from Wallace's ranch. Wallace was executed for the murder in 1950. His three accomplices, Henry Mobley, Herring Sivell, and Tom Strickland, subsequently pleaded guilty in exchange for life sentences.
Evelyn Scott	Robert Leonard Ewing Scott	Los Angeles	May 16, 1955	1957	The convict's wife. The crime was believed to have been motivated by money. Scott was sentenced to life in prison and paroled in 1978. He confessed after his parole.
Curtis Chillingworth and Marjorie Chillingworth	Floyd Holzapfel	Manalapan, Florida	June 15, 1955	December 12, 1960	Circuit court judge Chillingworth had reprimanded municipal court judge Peel for unethical behavior, and Peel feared being disbarred. Peel hired Holzapfel to kill Chillingworth and his wife. Holzapfel and accomplice Bobby Lincoln kidnapped the Chillingworths and dumped their bodies in the ocean with weights tied to their legs.
Curtis Chillingworth and Marjorie Chillingworth	Joseph Peel	Manalapan, Florida	June 15, 1955	March 30, 1961	Circuit court judge Chillingworth had reprimanded municipal court judge Peel for unethical behavior, and Peel feared being disbarred. Peel hired Holzapfel to kill Chillingworth and his wife. Holzapfel and accomplice Bobby Lincoln kidnapped the Chillingworths and dumped their bodies in the ocean with weights tied to their legs.
Patricia Weeks	Robert Weeks	Las Vegas, Nevada	June 1968	April 23, 1988	Robert Weeks was convicted of murdering his wife Patricia and his girlfriend Cynthia Jabour. Neither were ever found, and are believed to be hidden in Nevada mineshafts. Weeks is also suspected in the disappearances of another girlfriend, Carol Riley, and his business partner Jim Shaw.
Cynthia Jabour	Robert Weeks	Las Vegas, Nevada	October 5, 1980	April 23, 1988	Robert Weeks was convicted of murdering his wife Patricia and his girlfriend Cynthia Jabour. Neither were ever found, and are believed to be hidden in Nevada mineshafts. Weeks is also suspected in the disappearances of another girlfriend, Carol Riley, and his business partner Jim Shaw.
Jan Susan Whitney	Jerry Brudos	Between Salem and Albany, Oregon	November 26, 1968	June 28, 1969	A 23-year-old woman lured to Brudos's home after her car broke down on Interstate 5. Several photos of Whitney depicting her before and after her death were found in Brudos's garage, along with a mold of resin made out of her breast. The body was found one month after Brudos pleaded guilty to her murder, downstream from where he said he had thrown it.
Rosemary Calandriello	Robert Zarinsky	Atlantic Highlands, New Jersey	August 25, 1969	1975	A teenage girl believed to have been abducted and murdered by a truck driver. Zarinsky, a suspected serial killer, denied knowing the victim until after his conviction, claiming her death was an accident. He died in 2008, never having disclosed the location of her body. It was the first-ever bodyless-murder conviction in New Jersey.
Donald Shea	Charles Manson, Bruce M. Davis, Steve "Clem" Grogan, Tex Watson	Chatsworth, California	August 26, 1969	December 13, 1971	Spahn Ranch foreman murdered by the Manson Family because they believed he had turned them in to the police. Grogan helped locate Shea's remains in 1977.
Judy Rivera	Antonio Rivera and Merla Walpole	San Bernardino, California	1974	March 13, 1975	Rivera and his ex-wife Walpole were convicted of second degree murder for killing their 3-year-old daughter. They had in fact abandoned their daughter at a gas station in San Francisco in 1965. Their conviction followed the discovery of a girl's skeletal remains near their home, which had been incorrectly identified as those of their daughter. Their convictions were reversed by the trial judge on a technicality and they were allowed to remain free on bail, but their innocence was only proven 7 months later when their daughter was discovered to be alive, adopted by another family.
Mary Kitts	Clarence Ray Allen and Eugene "Lee" Furrow	Fresno, California	July 1974	November 1977	A teenager murdered in 1974. Her body was weighed down and thrown into a river.
Katherine and Sheila Lyon	Lloyd Lee Welch	Washington, D.C.	March 25, 1975	September 12, 2017	Two sisters aged 10 and 12 who disappeared during a trip to a shopping mall. In 2013, Welch, a convicted and incarcerated child molester, became a suspect after it was noticed that he strongly resembled a young man seen stalking the girls by one of their friends, and that in 1975 he had gone to police to claim that he had seen an older man abducting the girls. After a cousin of Welch confessed to helping him burn two suspicious duffel bags at his property in Thaxton, Virginia in 1975, police searched the place and found items that had belonged to the girls, but no organic remains. Nevertheless, Welch pleaded guilty to both counts of abduction and murder and was sentenced to 48 years in prison. The 42 years that passed between the crime and the conviction is the longest such interval in an American bodyless murder case.
Melvin "Ricky" Pittman, Ernest Taylor, Alvin Turner, Randy Johnson and Michael McDowell	Philander Hampton	Newark, New Jersey	August 20, 1978	August 2011	Five teenagers who were presumably lured by at least one subject who was convicted. One suspect was eventually acquitted, and one other had died.
Diane Chorba	Ollie Bean	Luther, Michigan	May 24, 1979	2001	Chorba disappeared while pregnant with Bean's child. Bean claimed she was killed on board American Airlines Flight 191, which crashed with no survivors the day after her disappearance, but further investigation proved she was not on the flight. Bean was convicted of murder in 2001 after his ex-wife testified that he had shown her Chorba's body in a grave outside Bristol, Michigan.
Etan Patz	Pedro Hernandez	New York City	May 25, 1979	February 14, 2017	A six-year-old boy who disappeared on his way to the school stop. He was the first missing child whose photo appeared on a milk carton. In 2010, Hernandez confessed to strangling Patz after he walked into the convenience store where he worked and disposing of the body in the garbage. Various members of Hernandez's family claimed that he had confessed the murder to his church in the 1980s. In July 2025 Hernandez's conviction was overturned due to incorrect jury instructions, but the conviction was re-instated by the Supreme Court of the United States in June 2026.
Karen and Michael Reinert	Bill Bradfield	Philadelphia	June 22, 1979	1983	Brother and sister who vanished along with their mother, Susan Reinert, after she received a phone call from Bradfield. Susan's body was found three days later in the trunk of her car, which had been abandoned in Harrisburg, Pennsylvania, but the children never appeared. Bradfield, who was Susan's lover and the sole beneficiary of her life insurance, was convicted of conspiracy to commit murder and died in prison in 1998. Smith, the principal at the high school where both Bradfield and Susan Reinert were teachers, was found guilty of carrying out the murders and sentenced to death, but the sentence was overturned by the Pennsylvania Supreme Court due to prosecutorial misconduct.
Karen and Michael Reinert	Jay C. Smith	Philadelphia	June 22, 1979	1986	
Lucinda Schaefer and Andrea Hall	Lawrence Bittaker and Roy Norris	Glendora, California	June – July 1979	February 1981	First victims of serial killers Lawrence Bittaker and Roy Norris, who kidnapped, raped, tortured, and murdered a total of five teenage girls in California in 1979. Although the bodies of Schaefer and Hall were never found, Norris confessed that he and Bittaker had murdered them. In 1981, Bittaker was sentenced to death, while Norris was sentenced to life in prison.
Tiffany Papesh	Brandon Flagner	Maple Heights, Ohio	June 13, 1980	July 1985	Flagner admitted to abducting and molesting 8-year-old Papesh, dismembering her and disposing of her remains in multiple different locations. He later recanted his confession and his time card suggested he was at work 40 miles away, but he was nevertheless convicted of her murder. Papesh's remains have never been found.
Gina Hall	Stephen Epperly	Blacksburg, Virginia	June 28, 1980	December 1980	18-year-old Hall disappeared after leaving to go to a nightclub in Blacksburg. Her car and bloodstained items of clothing were later found abandoned near the New River. Stephen Epperly was convicted of her murder later that year in the first bodyless murder conviction in the state of Virginia. Partial remains of Hall's body were located in the New River Valley in 2020.
Patsy Gaisior	Frank Johnson and Robert Ruff	Harrisburg, Pennsylvania	December 3, 1980	May 7, 1982	Frank Johnson testified that he and Robert Ruff had abducted Gaisior, forced her to withdraw money from her account, and raped and shot her before throwing her body in the Anacostia River.
Gloria Korzon	William Korzon	Warrington, Pennsylvania	March 6, 1981	December 2019	According to her husband William, Gloria attempted to shoot him during an argument, at which point he took the gun from her and shot her in the head. He then dumped her body in the Delaware River. William had a long record of domestic abuse against Gloria. He pleaded guilty to voluntary manslaughter in December 2019.
Michael Winley	David Bullock	New York City	December 23, 1981	October 26, 1982	Serial killer Bullock pleaded guilty to killing his roommate Michael Winley and five others, although Winley's body was never found.
Sally Rawlings	Gary Lee Rawlings	Oklahoma City	May 26, 1982	June 1983	Sally Rawlings was last seen leaving her daughter Kimberly at daycare. Her abusive ex-husband Gary was visiting the city at the time and on the day of her disappearance he rented a Cessna 150 which he used to fly to Houston and back. After Sally's disappearance he tried to take custody of Kimberly, who had been confiscated from him during the divorce. Gary was convicted of Sally's murder in 1983; it's believed he dumped her into the Gulf of Mexico during the flight to Houston.
Christopher Lerch and Peggy Lerch	William Wickline	Columbus, Ohio	August 14, 1982	July 1985	Two drug dealers who were murdered by William Wickline in a dispute over a drug debt. Wickline then dismembered their bodies and disposed of the remains in an unknown location, according to sworn testimony from his girlfriend Teresa Kemp, who was present during the murders. Wickline was sentenced to death for the murders and executed in 2004.
Thomas Weed	Richard Ford, Robert Von Villas, Janie Oglivie	Northridge, Los Angeles, California	February 23, 1983	October 12, 1988 (Ford), November 4, 1988 (Von Villas)	Thomas Weed disappeared from his Northridge apartment in February 1983 and his car was later found abandoned at Los Angeles International Airport. His estranged wife, Janie Oglivie, testified that she had paid former police officers Richard Ford and Robert Van Villas to kill Weed because she believed he was embezzling from their business. Oglivie pleaded guilty to a reduced charge of second-degree murder in return for her testimony against Ford and Von Villas, who were convicted of first-degree murder.
Robin Benedict	William Henry James Douglas	Sharon, Massachusetts	March 5, 1983	May 7, 1984	Douglas bludgeoned Benedict with a small sledgehammer at his residence. He then drove with her corpse to Rhode Island, where he stopped at the parking lot of a shopping mall and made the impromptu decision to dispose of the body in a dumpster. One day after Benedict's disappearance, the murder weapon, along with some of the victim's and killer's clothes were found in a rest area five miles away from Sharon. A chemical test on a windbreaker owned by Douglas showed possible brain matter (lab work later determined inconclusive). Four months after her disappearance, a Toyota Tercel registered to Robin Benedict was impounded from the parking garage of Grand Central Station, where a foul odor was discovered. Prior to her death, Benedict was a prostitute whom Douglas had frequented, and motivation for the murder was determined to be anger over Benedict's termination of her illegal career and her desire to end sexual contact with Douglas. After an exhaustive search of landfills in Rhode Island, the body of Robin Benedict was never found. In 1984, Douglas was sentenced to 15 years' imprisonment in a state penitentiary for second-degree murder of Robin Benedict, which he began in 1989 following completion of a five-year sentence in federal prison for defalcation of $67,400 of the taxpayers' money, through way of a falsifying expenses from a National Institute of Health grant he had been awarded in 1982 while a biology professor at Tufts University, which he used to finance his patronization of the prostitute and treat her to expensive gifts. Douglas was also subject to a $29.5 million wrongful death lawsuit from Ellen and John Benedict, Robin's parents. Douglas was paroled in 1993, four years into his murder sentence.
Ruth Homberg	Gary Homberg	Stoughton, Wisconsin	November 5, 1983	1989	Homberg's girlfriend testified that he had admitted murdering his wife Ruth after she threatened to report him for embezzling money from his company.
Paul Seifert	William Seifert	Delevan, New York	February 13, 1984	April 1987	Seifert lured his brother, who had recently filed criminal charges against him, to a remote location where he shot him in the head once with a rifle, then set his van on fire. His alibi for the time in question turned out to be false and fiber evidence connected him to the crime scene. The conviction, the first obtained in New York for a bodyless murder without a confession from the defendant, was upheld on appeal despite a first-person account in a local magazine suggesting there had been serious jury misconduct.
Denice Haraway	Tommy Ward, Karl Fontenot	Ada, Oklahoma	April 28, 1984	October 26, 1985	Ward and Fontenot allegedly confessed to raping Haraway, stabbing her to death and burning her body. Both later recanted their confessions, but were convicted and sentenced to death, later commuted to life without parole. Haraway's body was found in 1986 in circumstances which contradicted Ward and Fontenot's confessions, but both men were convicted again at their second trial. Fontenot has since been exonerated and released, but Ward remains imprisoned.
Tammy Rothganger	Martin Priest	Eldon, Missouri	May 16, 1984	October 11, 2018	Rothganger was raped and murdered by suspected serial killer Priest after accepting a ride from him on her way to school. Priest evaded arrest until 2016, when his nephew told police he had witnessed his uncle strangling Rothganger. Priest was found guilty of capital murder in 2018. Rothganger's body is believed to be buried somewhere in Miller County.
Ron Levin	Joe Hunt	Los Angeles, California	June 6, 1984	April 23, 1987	Con artist Levin disappeared after allegedly defrauding Hunt's investment company, the Billionaire Boys Club. Hunt boasted to friends that he and his bodyguard Jim Pittman, who pleaded guilty to acting as an accessory after the fact, had murdered Levin and dumped his body in the Soledad Canyon.
Paula Godfrey, Lisa Stasi, Catherine Clampitt	John Edward Robinson	Overland Park, Kansas	September 1, 1984 – June 15, 1987	October 2002 – October 2003	Three women who disappeared after being offered jobs by the convict. The conviction for Stasi's murder was later overturned on a technicality.
Melvin Snyder	Ronald Harshman	Chambersburg, Pennsylvania	May 25, 1985	2000	Harshman shot Snyder with a .25 pistol and a casing found at his property matched one found in Snyder's barn, in addition to inmates that said Harshman confessed to them.
Gail Katz-Bierenbaum	Robert Bierenbaum	New York City	July 7, 1985	October 2000	The convict's wife. It is believed that the body was deposited in the ocean off of the coast of New Jersey, where he reportedly had flown a plane.
Alexander Olive	Ulysses Roberson	South Lake Tahoe, California	November 9, 1985	December 2009	Olive's abusive non-custodial father, Ulysses H. Roberson, abducted him in 1985. He was charged with murdering Olive in 2001 on the strength of eyewitness and forensic evidence, and eventually convicted of second-degree murder in 2009.
Laura Henderson	Jack Ibach and Donald McDonald	Kodiak, Alaska	March 28, 1986	1987	Laura Henderson disappeared during a custody battle with her ex-husband Jack Ibach. Jack and Donald McDonald, who Jack was alleged to have hired to kill Laura, were convicted of the crime.
Michelle Dorr	Hadden Clark	Silver Spring, Maryland	May 24, 1986	1999	A six-year-old girl who disappeared from her father's backyard while he was taking a nap. The father confessed to the murder in a psychotic episode, but was later exonerated. The real murderer was serial killer Hadden Clark, who offered to disclose the body's location as part of a plea deal. Although this deal was not made, Clark still showed police where to find Dorr's body, after his conviction.
Helle Crafts	Richard Crafts	Newtown, Connecticut	November 19, 1986	November 21, 1989	A Danish-American woman murdered by her husband, in a case popularly known as the "wood-chipper murder". It is believed Helle Crafts had been beaten to death and was then dismembered, frozen and placed in a wood chipper aimed over a bridge. Fragments of a body were found, yet only a tooth crown with a filling as well as hair consistent with the victim's indicated the body was Crafts'. Despite this, the case is often referred to as a conviction without a body, as the remains could not be definitively proven to be that of Crafts, despite the tooth being positively matched to Helle's dental records. It was the first bodyless murder conviction in Connecticut history. Initially, a trial in 1987 was mistrialed.
James Doxtator, Richard Guerrero, Edward Smith, David Thomas	Jeffrey Dahmer	Various	January 16, 1988 – September 24, 1990	February 15 – May 22, 1992	The bodies were dismembered and taken out with the trash, pulverized and scattered in the woods, or dissolved in acid.
Cathy Ford	Paul Ferrell	Gorman, Maryland	February 17, 1988	February 4, 1989	Waitress Cathy Ford disappeared while on her way to meet with an unknown person. Paul Ferrell, a sheriff's deputy living in Gormania, West Virginia just across the river from Gorman, was convicted of murdering Ford.
Carla Almeida	Tevfik Sivri	Trumbull, Connecticut	April 18, 1988	1995	Almeida visited Sivri's home as a masseuse. The prosecution used blood analysis to confirm the murder. The amount of blood found in Sivri's house and trunk made it unlikely for Almeida to have survived the attack. Body was located on a wooded property of a Monroe resident in 1992.
Irene May	Kerry Lyn Dalton, Mark Lee Tompkins, Sheryl Ann Baker	Live Oak Springs, California	June 26, 1988	May 23, 1995	Dalton was convicted of the torture and murder of Irene May, whose body was allegedly dismembered and disposed of on a nearby Indian reservation.Two accomplies, Mark Tompkins and Sheryl Baker, pleaded guilty to murder and testified against Dalton at trial.
Joaquin Esteves	Orlando Cruz Vasquez	San Jose, California	December 13, 1988	December 1990	Vasquez was arrested driving Esteves' car, which had scratch marks in the trunk, after his disappearance and was found to have several of his personal belongings in his possession.
Shirley Gibbs Russell	Robert Peter Russell	Quantico, Virginia	March 4, 1989	May 3, 1991	FBI prosecutors were able to successfully convict Robert Russell of murdering his estranged wife, United States Marine Captain Shirley Russell, one day after she picked up the final version of the couple's marriage separation agreement. The prosecutors argued he shot her with a .25 caliber handgun he purchased at a pawn shop, then disposed of her body down one of hundreds of mineshafts. One of the most damning pieces of evidence was Robert's 25-step plan that detailed how he intended to pull off the crime. This case is the subject of the 1997 TV movie entitled "Perfect Crime".
Ruby Morris	Earl Morris	Cave Creek, Arizona	June 3, 1989	March 3, 1992	Prosecution used blood analysis to prove that Ruby was dead because of the large amount of blood found in the house. Earl admitted to burning her body but claimed she had committed suicide.
Joan Butler, Theresa Brown, and Christine Rusch	Richard Grissom	Kansas City, Kansas	June 18–26, 1989	November 4, 1990	The women went missing in the span of just over a week in Kansas City. Some of their belongings were found in Grissom's car along with blood and hair analyses providing proof that the three had been murdered.
Jami Sherer	Steven Sherer	Redmond, Washington	September 30, 1990	June 8, 2002	Steven Sherer's wife Jami vanished after calling her mother, saying that she would visit her mother immediately after visiting a local restaurant.
Thomas Gibson	Larry Gibson	Azalea, Oregon	March 18, 1991	March 1995	Thomas Gibson disappeared from his front yard in 1991. His father Larry Gibson was convicted of manslaughter in his son's disappearance after his daughter Karen testified that she had witnessed him beating Thomas on the day of his disappearance.
Robin Kerry	Marlin Gray, Antonio Richardson, Daniel Winfrey, Reginald Clemons	St. Louis, Missouri	April 5, 1991	December 9, 1992	Robin Kerry, her sister Julie, and their cousin Thomas Cummins were attacked on the Chain of Rocks Bridge by four men who gang raped Robin and Julie before throwing them and Cummins into the Mississippi River. Cummins survived, but Julie and Robin both drowned; Robin's body was never recovered. One of the attackers, Daniel Winfrey, pleaded guilty to the murders and testified against the other three.
Scott Dunn	Leisha Hamilton, Timothy James Smith	Lubbock, Texas	May 31, 1991	1996	Law enforcement used blood analysis to claim that Scott Dunn could not have survived. Body was found in 2016.
Katherine Heckel	Loyd Groves	Lock Haven, Pennsylvania	July 15, 1991	December 2018	Katherine Heckel disappeared during her lunch break from the paper company where she worked. At the time, she was attempting to break off the affair she was having with co-worker Loyd Groves, which he did not want to end. In 2015, Groves was arrested after blood found in his van in 1991 was DNA tested and found to belong to Heckel. He was convicted of third-degree murder in 2018.
Dawn Sanchez	Bernardo Bass	Los Altos, California	August 1991	August 29, 2009	Dawn Sanchez disappeared in 1991 after leaving a motor lodge in Los Altos with Bernardo Bass. 18 years later in 2009, NASA technology was used to uncover where the disassembled, bloodstained remains of Bass's missing car were buried. A cadaver dog had also smelled human remains in Bass's closet.
Colleen Reed	Kenneth McDuff	Austin, Texas	December 29, 1991	February 23, 1994	Reed was abducted, raped, and tortured by Kenneth McDuff and Alva Worley. Worley later testified that he had left Reed in the car with McDuff, who had told Worley he would "use her up" and borrowed a knife and shovel from him before dropping him off. McDuff was convicted of Reed's murder in 1994. While awaiting execution in 1998, he showed police where he buried Reed and two other victims.
John D'Amato	Philip Abramo, Giuseppe Schifilliti, Stefano Vitabile	Brooklyn, New York City	January 1992	July 4, 2003	DeCavalcante crime family mobster murdered for engaging in homosexual activity. His killers later turned informer and testified against the men who ordered his murder.
Ron Stadt	Ramon Rogers	San Diego, California	June 24, 1993	June 30, 1997	Rogers was convicted of murdering Stadt, a friend whose wife he had had an affair with, and Toronczak, his ex-girlfriend and the mother of his child. Both victims had disappeared after arguing with Rogers, who had given contradictory explanations for their absence. Incriminating evidence was found in Rogers' storage unit, including Toronczak's severed fingers, bloodstained tools, torn female clothing, and a calendar with the dates of the victim's disappearances torn off. Rogers was also convicted of murdering another ex-girlfriend, Rose Albano, whose mutilated remains were found near Valley Center.
Beatrice Toronczak	Ramon Rogers	San Diego, California	February 18, 1996	June 30, 1997	
Sara Anne Wood	Lewis S. Lent Jr.	Litchfield, New York	August 18, 1993	1996	12-year-old Wood disappeared while cycling near her home in Litchfield in 1983. Lewis Lent Jr. admitted to abducting and murdering her three years later and was sentenced to 25 years to life despite recanting his confession and the body not being found in the location he gave.
Rose Larner	John Ortiz-Kehoe	Albion, Michigan	December 7, 1993	1997	Billy Brown told police that Kehoe killed Rose Larner and that he helped Kehoe cover up the evidence by burning her body and then scattering her ashes on highways.
Shannon Melendi	Colvin "Butch" Hinton	Atlanta, Georgia	March 26, 1994	August 2004	Hinton dismembered her body and burned in a fire pit.
Harold Enzler, Nancy Bellamy	Billy Dean Smith	Nikiski, Alaska	March 27, 1994	February 11, 2003	Smith confessed to police that he had murdered Enzler and Bellamy with help from two co-defendants.
Don Hardin	Dale Whitmer	San Diego, CA	March 29, 1994	October 2, 1997	Whitmer was a homeless man that stayed in the Hardin's back yard in an RV, police only found Hardin's hands. About one year later, investigators received an anonymous letter (later revealed to have been written by Dale Whitmer's daughter Andrea) that contained information only the killer (or someone close to the killer) would know; that Whitmer had killed and dismembered Hardin and robbed his house.
Khristine Smith	Russell Smith	Portage, MI	September 28, 1994	December 1998	Khristine Smith disappeared from her home on September 28, 1994. Four years later, her husband Russell Smith was charged with her murder and arrested. Russell subsequently plead guilty to second-degree murder, admitting to shooting and killing Khristine on September 28 during an argument about custody of their daughter. Russell then placed her body in a steel barrel, borrowed a friend's boat, and dumped the barrel several miles into Lake Erie. Despite several searches of Lake Erie based on Russell's confession, Khristine's remains have never been found.
Kiplyn Davis	Timmy Brent Olsen	Spanish Fork, Utah	May 2, 1995	February 11, 2011	15-year-old girl last seen taking lunch at Spanish Fork High School, which she attended. Although Olsen pleaded guilty to manslaughter, he claimed another person killed Davis with a rock, and that he only helped conceal the body. However, he refuses to reveal the other person's identity or the body's location.
Yolanda Panek	Abdur Rashid Al-Wadud	Portland, Oregon	July 13, 1995	March 25, 1996	A young mother who went missing from a motel in Portland, Oregon. Her room was discovered with a blood-soaked mattress, and her personal effects were found in the motel trash. Her 2-year-old son was found the following morning, alive, in her locked car nearby. Panek's common-law husband, Abdur Rashid Al-Wadud, was charged with her murder within one week of her disappearance, and convicted in March 1996.
Diane van Reeth	John "Jack" Kalhauser	Arizona	August 10, 1995	1999	The wife of the convict, a serial killer.
Madalyn Murray O'Hair, Jon Garth Murray, Robin Murray O'Hair	David Roland Waters, Gary Paul Karr	San Antonio, Texas	September 29, 1995	August 2000	The ruling board of American Atheists, Inc., who were abducted, robbed and murdered in a conspiracy led by Waters, a former employee who had a personal vendetta against Madalyn. Waters was helped by Karr and a third man, Danny Fry, who was also murdered by Waters and Karr. Five months after their conviction, Waters led the FBI to the shallow grave where they had buried the three victims and the head and hands of Fry.
Carolyn Killaby	Dennis Smith	Orchards, Washington	November 11, 1995	May 1998	Killaby's blood was found in Smith's car. He claimed at trial that they had had consensual sex and she had then been attacked and abducted by another man, identifying her husband Dan as that man. After his conviction Smith admitted to the killing and led police in a search for Killaby's body, but it was not found.
Justina Morales	Luis Santiago	New York City	December 31, 1995	1997	The abused eight-year-old daughter of the convict's girlfriend. Her disappearance was not reported nor investigated until more than a year after her death.
Robert Wykel	Myron C. Wynn	Burien, Washington	February 21, 1996	April 2011	A man robbed and murdered by Wynn, who had accompanied him to look at an old car he was considering purchasing. Wynn repeatedly changed his account of the time he spent with Wykel when he was confronted with new information; police later linked him to the crime through a distinctive diamond very similar to one from a ring Wykel wore and an incriminating remark he made to a friend that contradicted what he had earlier told police.
Doris Lentz	Jay Lentz	Arlington, Virginia	April 23, 1996	July 6, 2003	Doris Lentz disappeared while in the process of divorcing her husband Jay, and her blood-spattered vehicle was later found. Jay was convicted of her murder seven years later. The verdict was later reversed, but a second trial in 2006 also found Jay guilty.
April Dawn Pennington	George M. Leniart	Uncasville, Connecticut	May 29, 1996	2010	Patrick Allain testified that George Leinart raped and killed Pennington.
Marek Kosciukiewicz	Gary Wilson	Katy, Texas	June 15, 1996	October 2001	Wilson admitted in a letter to a friend that he beat Kosciukiewicz to death with a hammer in an argument about Kosciukiewicz's wife Alicja, before dismembering his body and disposing of his remains along a highway in Oklahoma. He maintained it was self-defense, but prosecutors argued that he was obsessed with Alicja and acted out of jealousy. Wilson was arrested in Canada after a year on the run, and extradited to Texas after a three-year legal battle before pleading guilty to murder the following year.
Anne Marie Fahey	Thomas Capano	Wilmington, Delaware	June 27, 1996	January 17, 1999	A woman murdered by her lover, the former attorney general of Delaware, after she was last seen dining with him outside their native state. It is believed that her body was dumped in the ocean near New Jersey. Capano was having an affair with the victim prior to her murder.
Nancy Riggins	Stephen Paul Riggins	Hanover, Maryland	July 1, 1996	July 20, 2001	Nancy Riggins disappeared after learning about her husband’s affair with the couple's 18-year-old babysitter, who was underage when the affair began, and threatening to report it and divorce him. Her husband was charged four years later after it came to light that he had admitted the crime to a fellow inmate while serving time in prison for statutory rape over the affair. After his conviction he agreed to lead police to his wife's body, which was only three miles from their home.
Janet Levine March	Perry and Arthur March	Nashville, Tennessee	August 15, 1996	August 16, 2006	A woman who disappeared after supposedly having an argument with her husband, who moved to Mexico with their children several years later. Perry March was convicted after ten years due to inconsistencies in his story and incriminating statements made to fellow jail inmates. Arthur March, his father, confessed to placing Janet's body in a pile of cleared brush.
Clarissa Culberson	Vincent Doan	Blanchester, Ohio	August 29, 1996	August 7, 1997	Culberson disappeared after leaving her residence to confront Doan, her abusive ex-boyfriend who had been stalking her. Doan admitted that Culberson had come to see him, but he changed his story repeatedly and a neighbour had seen him assaulting Culberson in his front yard on the day she disappeared.
Sylvia Marie Parker	Dennis Yancy	Elephant Butte, New Mexico	July 5, 1997	December 2, 1999	Parker is believed to have been a victim of David Parker Ray, a serial rapist suspected of the torture and murder of up to 60 women in the New Mexico area. However, the only person ever charged with her death was her boyfriend Dennis Yancy, who pleaded guilty to murdering her in December 1999. Yancy maintained that he killed her under orders from Ray and helped dispose of the body, but was unable to lead police to her, thought to be because Ray moved her body afterwards in case Yancy ever tried to inform on him.
Pegye Bechler	Eric Bechler	Newport Beach, California	July 7, 1997	December 2000	Eric Bechler claimed that his wife Pegye had been swept overboard by a rogue wave while they were celebrating their five-year anniversary on their speedboat. Investigators were suspicious as there was no record of a rogue wave that day. One of Eric's friends also told police that he had said he was contemplating killing Pegye and throwing her in the sea. Eric was eventually arrested in 1999 after telling his girlfriend, Tina New, that he hit Pegye over the head and then weighted her down with a pair of dumbbells. In December 2000 he was sentenced to life in prison.
Jennifer Long	Wesley Ira Purkey	Kansas City, Missouri	January 22, 1998	November 5, 2003	Purkey admitted to abducting Long and driving her across state lines to Lansing, Kansas before raping her, stabbing her to death, dismembering her with a chainsaw, burning her remains and disposing of the ashes in a septic pond.
Irene Silverman	Kenneth and Sante Kimes	New York City	June 1998	2000	A woman killed by a mother-son con artist team as part of an identity-theft scheme. At trial Kenneth testified to disposing of her body.
Amanda Victoria Brown	Willie Crain Jr.	Tampa, Florida	September 11, 1998	September 13, 1999	Crain was convicted of kidnapping and murdering Brown after she disappeared from her home in 1998, and sentenced to death. It was believed Crain had abandoned the body in the waters where he set up crab traps.
Chris Benedetto	Michael Koblan	Riviera Beach, Florida	November 11, 1998	March 9, 2005	Chris Benedetto and his wife, Janette Piro, were reported missing in November 1998 after having not been seen for five days. Chris Benedetto was last seen boarding his boat with his brother-in-law Michael Koblan, who later returned the boat to harbor without Benedetto. Piro's body was found in a freezer at the couple's home; Benedetto's is believed to have been dumped at sea. Koblan was convicted of both murders in 2005.
Cyndi Vanderheiden	Loren Herzog, Wesley Shermantine	Clements, California	November 14, 1998	1999 (Herzog), 2001 (Shermantine)	Vanderheiden was murdered after leaving her motel with serial killers Herzog and Shermantine. Herzog confessed to her murder and several others, and her blood was found in Shermantine's car. Both were convicted of Vanderheiden's murder, though Herzog was later given a new trial and pleaded guilty to manslaughter, serving eleven years before being paroled. He killed himself in 2012 after learning that Shermantine had told the police about his involvement in other murders. Vanderheiden's body was found the following month after Shermantine led police to one of the duo's burial grounds.
Dominick Pendino	Gregory Chrysler, Larry Weygant	Newburgh, New York	March 3, 1999	2000	A man killed after he was falsely thought to have reported his killers for drug-related crimes. Prosecutors were able to get Orange County's first bodyless murder conviction with expert testimony that the large stain left by Pendino's blood in the back of a car came from a wound that could only have been lethal, as well as an informant who recalled how one of the two had forced him to clean up a bloody truck shortly thereafter.
Katie Poirier	Donald Blom	Moose Lake, Minnesota	May 26, 1999	2000	A woman abducted from her job at a local convenience store. Bone chips and a tooth found in a fire pit on Blom's property were linked to her, although DNA could not be tested; surveillance video also suggested he was the abductor. It was the first bodyless murder conviction in Minnesota history.
Unidentified infant	Victoria Bell Banks	Butler, Alabama	August 1999	November 2000 - May 2001	Victoria Bell Banks, awaiting trial in February 1999, claimed to be pregnant and asked to be released from jail to give birth. When police observed in August that there was no baby, Bell was arrested for infanticide. She and her husband Medell Banks, both of whom are mentally disabled, admitted to killing the baby and burying it in the woods, but no body was found; it was later established that Bell had undergone surgery that would have prevented her from getting pregnant. The two later recanted their admissions, with Bell claiming she had invented the pregnancy to get out of jail, but nevertheless pleaded guilty to killing the alleged infant to avoid capital murder charges. Medell Banks' conviction was later vacated, but Bell, who never appealed her conviction, remains imprisoned.
Unidentified infant	Medell Banks	Butler, Alabama			
Katelyn Rivera-Helton	Robert Rivera	Boothwyn, Pennsylvania	August 10, 1999	January 2002	Twenty-month-old Katelyn Rivera-Helton was taken from her home by her non-custodial father Robert. She was last seen in Rivera's car at a gas station in Chadds Ford Township; Rivera returned to the station two hours later without Katelyn. At his trial Rivera maintained that Katelyn was still alive but refused to divulge her whereabouts.
Girly Chew Hossencofft	Diazien Hossencofft, Linda Henning	Albuquerque, New Mexico	September 9, 1999	2002	A Malaysian-American woman murdered by her husband and his mistress. Blood matched to the victim was in a large quantity which proved she could not have survived the attack.
Sandra Rosas	Gabriel Gomez	Rowland Heights, California	October 23, 1999	October 31, 2000	Gomez was convicted of killing his half-sister Sandra Rosas, the wife of singer Cesar Rosas. Traces of blood from both of them were found in Rosas' abandoned van, and her daughter had overheard Gomez threatening to rape and murder her. Gomez led police to Rosas' grave in Santa Clarita after his conviction.
Lauria Bible and Ashley Freeman	Ronnie Busick	Welch, Oklahoma	December 29, 1999 or December 30, 1999	2020	Two 16-year-old friends went missing after Freeman's house burned down. Lauria was attending a sleepover at Ashley's residence. The charred remains of Freeman's parents were discovered in the rubble; both were shot in the head. Two convicted killers—Tommy Lynn Sells and Jeremy Jones, confessed to murdering them, but both recanted their admissions. In April 2018, Ronnie Busick was arrested and charged with four accounts of first-degree homicide for the deaths of Bible and the Freeman family. Two other suspects— Warren Phillip "Phil" Welch II (died 2007) and David Pennington (died 2015)—were also identified. It was reported that "at least a dozen" witnesses claimed all three men bragged about raping and murdering Bible and Freeman and having taken Polaroid photographs of them. An affidavit made by a female witness who had lived with Welch for a brief time asserts that "she heard conversations between the three men where they disclosed that the murder victims had owed them money". According to the affidavit, Welch, Pennington, and Busick had claimed to have raped and tortured the two friends before disposing of their remains "in a pit" or mine shaft in Picher, Oklahoma. In 2020, Busick pleaded guilty to being an accessory to first-degree homicide in the deaths of Ashley's parents, arson of the Freemans' home, and the abduction and presumed slayings of the two teenagers.
Zebb Quinn	Robert Jason Owens	Asheville, North Carolina	January 2, 2000	July 2022	Robert Jason Owens, a longtime person of interest in Quinn's disappearance, claimed that his uncle, Walter "Gene" Owens, killed Quinn then dismembered and burned his body, and Robert assisted in the cover-up. Owens was convicted of accessory after-the-fact to first-degree murder of Zebb Quinn.
Michele Anne Harris	Cal Harris	Spencer, New York	September 11, 2001	2009	The investigation into Michele's disappearance was hampered by a shortage of available resources due to many of them being diverted downstate in the wake of the terror attacks. The couple had been going through a bitter divorce where Michele stood to gain a lucrative settlement; her family claimed Cal had threatened to kill her and dispose of her body where it would never be found. Police found some drops of blood in the house's garage and kitchen that could have been Michele's, but never any body or a weapon. Cal was tried four times after being indicted in 2005. The first ended in a conviction but was set aside when new witnesses emerged who claimed to have seen Michele the morning after she had last been seen; the second also resulted in a conviction that was reversed on appeal. A third trial in a different county ended with a hung jury; Cal was ultimately acquitted after a bench trial in the same jurisdiction.
Jan Scharf	Glyn Scharf	Cameron Park, California	May 14, 2002	October 21, 2004	Scharf was convicted of murdering his missing wife, whose remains were never located. Neighbors testified that the victim had been heard screaming in their house on the night of her disappearance and her jewellery was found buried in the front yard of Scharf's girlfriend, who she had never met. Scharf later committed suicide in prison, without revealing the location of the body.
Logan Tucker	Katherine Rutan	Woodward, Oklahoma	June 23, 2002	2007	A six-year-old boy who vanished in 2002. His mother was eventually convicted of his death.
Jennifer Marcum	Scott Lee Kimball	Denver, Colorado	February 17, 2003	2009	Last known to have been alive in the company of serial killer Kimball; she was supposedly to accompany him to Seattle to take a job managing a coffee shop in a chain he claimed to own. Her car was found at the Denver airport and towed six weeks later. Kimball, then working as an FBI informant purportedly trying to get evidence that Marcum and her imprisoned boyfriend were conspiring to have a witness against the boyfriend killed, claimed later that she had actually flown to New York to do that; but there was no record she ever boarded any flight and her cell phone activity ends on the date. Later he told the FBI another drug dealer killed her. Kimball pleaded guilty to killing Marcum, the first of his four known victims, as part of a plea deal that would have resulted in a shorter sentence. It was conditioned on him leading police to all of the bodies, and after several possible locations for Marcum's turned up empty, he claimed he had forgotten, thus voiding the plea deal. After her murder, Kimball had expressed some concern, without admitting to the murder, that her breast implants could be used to identify her body and asked at least one acquaintance if he would go to her body and remove them for him; police believe that he may actually know the location of the body. He is currently serving a 70-year sentence.
Tim Schuster	James Fagone, Larissa Schuster	Clovis, California	July 10, 2003	December, 2006 (Fagone); December 12, 2007 (Schuster)	The husband of Larissa Schuster, he was rendered unconscious via chloroform and a stun gun before being dumped in a barrel of hydrochloric acid by his wife and James Fagone. The remains of his dissolved body were later found in the barrel.
Nilsa Arizmendi	William Devin Howell	Wethersfield, Connecticut	July 24, 2003	January 2007	A sex worker who was reported missing by her sister on July 31, 2003, after she had been gone for seven days. Arizmendi's boyfriend told police that he had last seen Arizmendi getting into a van with William Devin Howell, a drifter who they had allowed to stay in their motel room overnight. Blood found on the seat cushions in Howell's van was identified as being 99% certain to have come from Arizmendi. Howell was sentenced to 15 years in prison after entering an Alford plea to manslaughter, as a legal technicality prevented him from being charged with murder. Just weeks later Arizmendi's body was found in a mass grave in New Britain, alongside the bodies of six other women murdered by Howell.
Marion Fye	Harold Austin	Washington, D.C.	November 27, 2003	April 2006	On Thanksgiving Day 2003, Fye's children heard her arguing with her boyfriend Harold Austin, followed by a gunshot and a thud. Her blood was soaked on a mattress in the house the two shared.
Jason Galehouse	Steven Lorenzo, Scott Schweickert	Tampa, Florida	December 19, 2003	June 9, 2016 (Schweickert); December 2, 2022 (Lorenzo)	Galehouse was one of two gay men drugged, raped, tortured, and murdered by serial rapists Lorenzo and Schweickert. His remains were never found. Schweickert pleaded guilty to the murders in exchange for life imprisonment as part of a plea deal to testify against Lorenzo, who was sentenced to death. Lorenzo and Schweickert were also convicted of raping nine other men and sentenced to lengthy prison terms in a federal prison.
Brooke Wilberger	Joel Courtney	Corvallis, Oregon	May 24, 2004	September 21, 2009	Wilberger was abducted while visiting her sister in Oregon. Joel Courtney pled guilty to murdering her five years later and directed police to where he buried the body.
Thomas and Jackie Hawks	Skylar Julius Deleon, Jennifer Henderson, John Kennedy, Alonso Machain	Prescott, Arizona	November 15, 2004	November 17, 2006 – May 1, 2009	A couple believed to have been murdered for monetary reasons. Their bodies are believed to have been thrown into the body of water on which their vessel was traveling.
Ashley Parlier, Tianna Phillips	Harold Haulman	Battle Creek, Michigan (Parlier), Berwick, Pennsylvania (Phillips)	June 12, 2005 – June 13, 2018	February 1, 2023	Serial killer Haulman admitted to the murders of Parlier and Phillips while awaiting trial for the 2020 murder of Erica Shultz in Butler Township.
Rolenia Adele Morris	Lonnie David Franklin Jr.	Los Angeles, California	September 10, 2005	May 5, 2016	One of several victims of the Grim Sleeper, Morris was last seen in the 9000 block of south Western Avenue in Los Angeles, California on September 10, 2005. Her Nevada driver's license and two sexually explicit pictures of her lifeless body were found in Franklin's garage. Her body has never been found. Prosecutors presented this evidence at Franklin's sentencing.
Christie Wilson	Mario Garcia	Lincoln, California	October 5, 2005	September 2006	Christie Wilson was last seen leaving a casino with Mario Garcia, who had previous convictions for violence against women. He was convicted of Wilson's murder despite her body still being missing after her blood and hair was found in his car. 15 years later in August 2020, Christie Wilson's skeleton was unearthed on Garcia's property.
Teresa Halbach	Steven Avery	Manitowoc County, Wisconsin	October 31, 2005	March 18, 2007	DNA belonging to Avery was found in Halbach's abandoned car, and charred bone fragments were found in a fire pit near Avery's home. The case is controversial and was the subject of the Netflix documentary series Making a Murderer.
Four unidentified Iraqis	John E. Hatley, Joseph P. Mayo, Michael Leahy	Baghdad, Iraq	April 2006	April 16, 2009	Members of the convict's unit testified that they had shot four Mahdi Army suspects execution-style and disposed of their bodies in a canal.
Jessica O'Grady	Chris Edwards	Omaha, Nebraska	May 10, 2006	March 30, 2007	The convict's girlfriend. The case largely relied on blood found in Edwards's house and car.
Nina Reiser	Hans Reiser	Oakland, California	September 3, 2006	April 28, 2008	The convict's wife. He was given a reduced charge of second degree murder in exchange for disclosing the location of the victim's remains, which were recovered in 2008.
Michael Deloge	Sheila LaBarre	Epping, New Hampshire	c.2005	June 2008	One of Deloge's bones was found in a septic tank alongside his birth certificate and a spent shell casing. LaBarre admitted killing Deloge and another man whose burnt remains were found on her property.
Shamaia Smith	Kenneth Otto Sr	Vernon Rockville, CT	March 14, 2007	Feb 11, 2009	He shot and killed Smith and then burned her body.
Tynesha Stewart	Timothy Shepard	Harris County, Texas	March 15, 2007	October 9, 2008	Shepard murdered his ex-girlfriend and incinerated her body using a barbecue grill. He later led police to a dumpster where they found Stewart's hair and teeth.
Theresa Parker	Samuel Parker	Lafayette, Georgia	March 22, 2007	September 2009	Police officer Samuel Parker was convicted of murdering his wife, 911 dispatcher Theresa. Theresa's remains were found in the Chattanooga River the year after the trial.
Jake Branam, Kelly Branam, Scott Gamble, Samuel Kairy	Kirby Logan Archer	Miami	September 22, 2007	July 25, 2008	The Joe Cool charter boat set out from Miami on September 22, 2007. Aboard were crew members Jake and Kelly Branam, Scott Gamble, and Samuel Kairy, and passengers Kirby Archer and Guillermo Zarabozo. Two days later the boat was found adrift off the coast of Cuba, 140 miles off course. Archer and Zarabozo were found nearby in the life raft. They told investigators that the boat was hijacked by pirates who murdered the crew and threw them into the sea before trying to sail the boat to Cuba. Archer later admitted that he and Zarabozo had committed the murders themselves in an attempt to sail to Cuba so that Archer could escape an outstanding arrest warrant. Archer pled guilty as part of a deal to testify against Zarabozo, who was convicted of four counts of murder in 2009. The victims' bodies were never recovered.
Jake Branam, Kelly Branam, Scott Gamble, Samuel Kairy	Guillermo Zarabozo	Miami	September 22, 2007	February 19, 2009	
Pamela Butler	Jose Rodriguez-Cruz	Washington, D.C.	February 12, 2009	October 6, 2017	Butler's boyfriend admitted to killing her eight years after she disappeared. He agreed to lead police to her body as a condition of his guilty plea, but a search of the area where he admitted to burying her failed to locate a body. He was later convicted of murdering another woman whose body was buried near where he claimed to have buried Butler.
Shannon Rippy Van Newkirk	James Opelton Bradley	Wilmington, North Carolina	April 5, 2014	June 29, 2017	A body found in the search for Newkirk turned out to be another woman killed by Bradley.
Julie Ann Gonzalez	George De La Cruz	Austin, Texas	March 26, 2010	April 22, 2015	Victim was the convict's estranged wife. The state rejected offers for a lenient sentence in exchange for information about victim's fate.
Bethany Decker	Ronald Roldan	Ashburn, Virginia	January 29, 2011	November 17, 2022	Decker, five months pregnant and estranged from her husband, a soldier frequently deployed to Afghanistan, was last heard from calling the restaurant she worked at to check her schedule. Only after messages purportedly from her on her Facebook account struck friends as suspicious over the next three weeks did they check on her whereabouts and report her missing. Roldan, who had moved in with her after she left her husband, was known for his controlling and abusive behavior and told a later girlfriend that he knew how to make people disappear during a fight that led to him serving time for assault; upon his release from that sentence he was charged in Decker's murder. In 2022 he pleaded guilty to second-degree murder.
Aliayah Lunsford	Lena Lunsford Conaway	Weston, West Virginia	September 24, 2011	April 23, 2018	3-year-old Aliayah Lunsford vanished from her home in West Virginia in 2011. In 2018 her mother Lena was convicted of her murder. Two of Lunsford's sisters testified that they had seen their mother beat her to death with a wooden plank and carry her body out of the house in a clothes hamper.
Sierra LaMar	Antolin Garcia-Torres	Morgan Hill, California	March 16, 2012	May 9, 2017 (sentenced December 2017)	Sierra, a 15-year-old high schooler, disappeared one morning after missing her school bus. Her cellphone was found the day after she disappeared, a few blocks away from her bus stop, and then her clothing and purse were found the day after. The discovery of these items suggested she was not a runaway. DNA from Garcia-Torres was found on Sierra's purse. Garcia-Torres was also linked to attempted kidnappings of women in Safeway parking lots in Morgan Hill beginning in 2009 and was tried for these kidnappings during the trial. Garcia-Torres was convicted of murdering Sierra and sentenced to life without parole in 2017. Her body has never been found.
Leyla Namiranian	Michael Edwards	Chesterfield, Virginia	April 4, 2012	April 2016	Michael Anthony Edwards was convicted of second-degree murder in the disappearance of his ex-girlfriend, Leyla Namiranian. His conviction was upheld the following year.
Cari Farver	Shanna "Liz" Golyar	Omaha, Nebraska	November 2012	August 15, 2017	Farver disappeared in November 2012, not long after she had gone on a date with mechanic Dave Kroupa. Soon after, Kroupa, his ex-partner, and Liz Golyar, a woman he had dated shortly after Farver, began receiving threatening messages supposedly from Farver. In addition, Kroupa's apartment was burgled and Golyar's home was set on fire, killing several pets. In 2015, investigators suspected that Farver had been murdered in 2012 and that Golyar had been posing as her ever since. Later that year Golyar was shot in the leg at a park and claimed Kroupa's ex-partner was responsible. Investigators searched her devices and found an image appearing to show Farver's body on an SD card. Golyar was convicted and sentenced to life in prison.
James Foley, Steven Sotloff, Kayla Mueller, Peter Kassig	Alexanda Kotey, El Shafee Elsheikh	Syria	November 2012–October 2013	September 2, 2021 – April 14, 2022	American hostages of Islamic State who were abducted in Syria by the cell known as "The Beatles". Foley, Sotloff, and Kassig were all killed in beheading videos; Mueller's precise fate is unclear, but she is known to be dead. IS member Alexanda Kotey pled guilty to four counts of kidnapping resulting in death relating to the four hostages and fellow militant El Shafee Elsheikh was convicted of the same charges the following year.
Kelsie Schelling	Donthe Lucas	Pueblo, Colorado	Feb 4, 2013	March 8, 2021	Prosecution built a circumstantial case off a hair found in the tire well of Schelling's car, a prison inmate that stated Lucas confessed that he killed Schelling, and a series of circumstantial evidence that Lucas stole Schelling's car, cell phone and $400 from her ATM.
Victoria Prokopovitz	James Prokopovitz	Brown County, Wisconsin	April 25, 2013	February 28, 2021	59-year-old Victoria Prokopovitz disappeared from her Pittsfield, Wisconsin home on April 25, 2013, leaving her purse, wallet and cigarettes behind. Victoria's husband, James Prokopovitz reported her missing on April 26, stating that he last saw her the night before her disappearance. Prosecutors alleged Mr. Prokopovitz killed Victoria in order to have an affair with an old girlfriend, Kathy Friday. In a secret John Doe hearing relating to the case, both Mr. Prokopovitz and Ms. Friday provided false testimony about the timeline of their relationship, resulting in perjury and conspiracy to commit perjury charges being filed. Mr. Prokopovitz stated that he lied under oath because he was "concerned what people would think if they found out (he) was involved with another woman so soon after (Victoria) went missing." After pleading guilty to the perjury charge, Ms. Friday took her own life in 2020. On February 15, 2021, prosecutors delivered their opening statements in the State of Wisconsin vs. James Prokopovitz, charging Mr. Prokopovitz with first-degree intentional homicide, domestic abuse, obstructing an offer, and perjury before a court. Prosecutors claimed Victoria's body was not found because Mr. Prokopovitz disposed of her body in a sludge pond he had access to through his job at a paper mill. On February 28, 2021, after 24 hours of deliberation, the jury found Mr. Prokopovitz guilty on all counts, including first-degree intentional homicide. On May 26, 2021, Mr. Prokopovitz was sentenced to life in prison without parole. The case received national coverage and was broadcast live on Court TV.
Jessica Heeringa	Jeffrey Willis	Norton Shores, Michigan	April 26, 2013	May 16, 2018	Willis was serving life in prison since 2017 for the 2014 murder of Rebekah Blestch. Police had suspected Willis of kidnapping and murdering Heeringa as well, ever since the Blestch murder investigation began, but Heeringa's body was never found. Willis was convicted and sentenced to life in prison. His cousin Kevin Bluhm pleaded guilty to being an accessory after the fact by helping him dispose of her body, and received five years' probation.
Alexis Murphy	Randy Taylor	Lovingston, Virginia	August 3, 2013	May 8, 2014	17-year-old Alexis Murphy was last seen at a gas station and surveillance video subsequently identified Randy Taylor as a suspect. A search of his camper revealed multiple pieces of evidence, including a strand of Murphy's hair, a torn fingernail, and a diamond earring stud. Taylor was convicted of Murphy's abduction and murder, and given two life sentences. Murphy's remains were found in December 2020 and identified in February 2021. Taylor is also a suspect in the 2010 disappearance of Samantha Clarke.
Zulma Pabon	Dr. John Gibbs	Chesterfield, Virginia	June 7, 2014	December 7, 2017	Gibbs was convicted of killing his longtime girlfriend three and a half years after her disappearance. The couple had one child together. Gibbs had been convicted of federal child neglect of their son earlier in 2017.
Gail Doyle	James Stidd	Olympia, Washington	June 2, 2016	July 9, 2018	60-year-old Gail Doyle was friends with James Stidd. She was last seen with him in Olympia at the Boulevard Tavern. After a search had no results, law enforcement started questioning James Stidd. He spent time pressure-washing the interior of his garage but missed a small drop of blood on his truck. Additionally, law enforcement found blond hair and Ms. Doyle's hair on a hammer. Scott Jackson and Shawn Horlacher prosecuted the matter over an almost six-week trial. The 12-person jury returned a guilty verdict on all counts (murder charge and unlawful possession of a firearm). James Stidd was sentenced to 41 years in prison but died shortly after his incarceration.
Sarah Stern	Liam McAtasney	Belmar, New Jersey	December 2, 2016	June 21, 2019	19-year-old Sarah Stern disappeared in December 2016 and was declared missing when her car was found abandoned on a bridge in Belmar, New Jersey. She was first believed to have either faked her death or committed suicide, but it was later discovered that she was murdered by her childhood friend Liam McAtasney. McAtasney, who found out that Sarah had recently received over $10,000 from her late mother, strangled Sarah to death and with the help of his friend and roommate at the time, Preston Taylor, disposed of the body by throwing it over the same bridge where her car was found. Her body was never found and is believed to have drifted out to the Atlantic Ocean before it could be recovered. McAtasney was able to be convicted due to Taylor's testimony, evidence gathered by investigators (namely a lockbox hidden by the McAtasney twins that contained Sarah's money, Liam had the key to the lockbox in his possession at the time of his arrest), and his accidental self-incrimination when he confessed to the murder during a conversation with a friend whose car was equipped with an electronic device to tape and audio record the conversation.
Yingying Zhang	Brent Christensen	Urbana, Illinois	June 9, 2017	July 18, 2019	Christensen abducted Zhang after she missed her bus. Another woman, Emily Hogan, stated that Christensen posed as a police officer, similar to Ted Bundy, whom Christensen idolized. Christensen confessed to his ex-girlfriend that he had cut Zhang up into 3 pieces and dumped her body into garbage cans. Christensen was convicted and sentenced to life without parole for the murder by the federal judiciary.
James Steven Knowles	Mario Normore	Oklahoma City	October 3, 2017	March 21, 2023	Normore's accomplice and cousin Brandon Lee Butler testified that he had shot James Knowles and disposed of his body in an unknown location. He also testified to three other murders where the victim's bodies were recovered.
Mara Vestal	Jay Hammersley	Harris County, Texas	Feb 15, 2019	Oct 14, 2021	Jay Hammersley pled guilty and was sentenced to 40 years in prison for the murder of his wife Mara Vestal. Hammersley admitted to Harris County Sheriff’s Office Homicide Detectives that he strangled Vestal to death and later burned the body and disposed of her remains in a dumpster.
Anesha Murnane	Kirby Calderwood	Homer, Alaska	October 17, 2019	February 6, 2026	Murnane disappeared while walking to a medical appointment in October 2019. Kirby Calderwood was arrested in 2022 after his wife told police that he had confessed to raping and murdering Murnane. He pleaded guilty to murder in 2026.
Lori Slesinski	Derrill Richard Ennis	Auburn, Alabama	June 13, 2006	April 14, 2022	Ennis was convicted of murdering Slesinski, an acquaintance of his, sixteen years after she disappeared. Allegedly, Ennis kidnapped and murdered Slesinski after she rejected his romantic advances before disposing of her body and burning her car. He was sentenced to life imprisonment without parole.
Carol Jean Pierce	Richard Pierce	Sturgeon Bay, Wisconsin	September 5, 1975	April 29, 2022	Richard Gale Pierce was convicted in 2022 of murdering his wife Carol, whose body was never found, during the 1970s. Pierce claimed that his wife, with whom he frequently argued, had run away to start a new life, but was unable to provide any proof. Prosecution evidence included the fact that Pierce did not file a missing person report for 82 days after Carol's disappearance, that Carol had told friends she believed her husband planned to kill her, and that traces of human remains were also found at six locations in Pierce's home in Michigan, where he moved after Carol vanished.
Kristin Smart	Paul Flores	San Luis Obispo, California	May 25, 1996	October 18, 2022	Kristin Smart was last seen on the Cal Poly campus, walking home intoxicated after an off-campus party in the company of Paul Flores. When interviewed by investigators several days later, Flores had a black eye and scratches on his hands and knees, and later admitted to lying about how he got them. In 2019, the podcast Your Own Backyard reignited public interest in the case, and brought forward several new witnesses who spoke to police. A 2020 search of the suspect's home uncovered dozens of homemade videos of Flores sexually assaulting unconscious women. A 2021 search of his father's home located a 6-foot by 4-foot anomaly in the soil under his deck, and serological testing confirmed the presence of human blood. On October 18, 2022, a Monterey County jury found Paul Flores guilty of first-degree murder, while a separate jury acquitted his father, Ruben Flores, of accessory after the fact. Kristin Smart's body has not been recovered.
Harmony Montgomery	Adam Montgomery	Manchester, New Hampshire	December 2019	February 22, 2024	Five-year-old Harmony Montgomery was last seen in 2019. At the time, she was living with her father Adam and stepmother Kayla. After Adam had won sole custody of his daughter, her mother Crystal Sorey filed a missing report for her daughter
Jennifer Dulos	Michelle Troconis	New Canaan, Connecticut	May 24, 2019	March 1, 2024	Dulos, 50, was last seen on a neighbor's security camera returning home dropping her children off at their private school that morning. After she missed two doctor's appointments that day, she was reported missing; police found a large quantity of her blood spattered in the kitchen, along with some of her husband Fotis's, whom she was in the process of a contentious divorce from. Other evidence later suggested that Fotis and Troconis, his mistress, had disposed of the body and evidence later that day, but her body was never found. After Fotis took his own life following his arrest on evidence-tampering charges in January 2020, prosecutors brought murder charges against Troconis and Fotis's attorney.
Emmanuel Haro	Jake Haro	Yucaipa, California	August 14, 2025	October 16, 2025	Jake and Rebecca Haro called the police on August 14, 2025, to report that their 7-month-old son Emmanuel had been kidnapped by a stranger. Police soon became suspicious of the parents due to a prior conviction for child abuse, and inconsistencies were uncovered in their story. In September both parents were charged with Emmanuel's murder although his remains had not been located, and in October Jake Haro pleaded guilty to second-degree murder. Rebecca Haro later pleaded guilty to involuntary manslaughter in May 2026.
Ana Walshe	Brian Walshe	Cohasset, Massachusetts	January 1, 2023	December 15, 2025	Ana Walshe was last seen on New Year's Day 2023. Her husband Brian was arrested and later charged with murder based on his Internet search history, including terms such as "how to dismember a body with a hacksaw" and "best ways to dispose of a body", and his purchase of heavy-duty cleaning supplies, a utility knife, a hacksaw, and a protective suit, which he later disposed of in the trash. He claimed he had found Ana dead in her bed, panicked, and dismembered the body to avoid being blamed, but was found guilty of first-degree murder in December 2025.
Na'Ziyah Harris	Jarvis Butts	Detroit, Michigan	January 4, 2024	February 12, 2026	Butts pleaded guilty to second-degree murder and agreed to reveal the location of Harris's body. However, the body was not recovered despite his information, and Butts died by suicide two weeks after his sentencing.
Maya Millete	Larry Millete	Chula Vista, California	January 7, 2021	July 9, 2026	Maya Millete disappeared while in the process of separating from her husband Larry. Surveillance footage showed that Maya never left the home she shared with Larry; however, Larry had taken the family SUV out for several hours after Maya's phone connection abruptly terminated. The case gained much media attention due to Larry Millete having hired self-proclaimed "spellcasters" to place a hex on Maya, which he had abruptly called off the night she disappeared. Larry was convicted of first-degree murder in July 2026.
Steven Cozzi	Tomasz Roman Kosowski	Largo, Florida	March 21, 2023	September 23, 2026	Attorney Steven Cozzi disappeared shortly before a scheduled teleconference with Kosowski, a multimillionaire plastic surgeon who had threatened Cozzi over an ongoing lawsuit. His blood was found spattered in a bathroom in his law firm's office building, where he was last seen. Flock cameras recorded Kosowski exiting the building and loading a large object - believed to be Cozzi's body - into his truck before driving to his home in Tarpon Springs, where he transferred the body into another vehicle before disposing of it in a landfill near the Everglades. At a bench trial in 2026, Judge Joseph Bulone found Kosowski guilty of first-degree murder. Kosowski was sentenced to death on November 20, 2026.
Mamta Kafle Bhatt	Naresh Datt Bhatt	Manassas Park, Virginia	July 30, 2024	November 10, 2026	Mamta Kafle Bhatt, a 28-year-old pediatric nurse, disappeared from her Manassas Park home in late July 2024. Her husband, Naresh Bhatt, initially told police and local media that she had voluntarily walked out on him following a "normal night." After obtaining search warrants, investigators discovered massive blood pooling in the couple's primary bedroom and bathroom that had been hastily cleaned. Digital and financial forensics revealed that Naresh had purchased a saw and heavy-duty cleaning supplies in the days surrounding her disappearance, while vehicle telematics mapped his route to multiple undisclosed dumpsters. During his November 2026 trial, Naresh took the stand and admitted to dismembering Mamta and disposing of her remains in the trash, but claimed he did so in a panic after finding she had committed suicide by poisoning. The jury rejected this narrative, convicting him of first-degree murder, concealment of a dead body, and defiling a dead human body. Her remains have never been recovered.

== See also ==
- Lists of people who disappeared
- List of unsolved deaths
