= Murder of Tina Baker =

2002 murder in England

Tina Baker
- Born: United Kingdom
- Disappeared: July 2002
- Known for: Victim of murder
- Spouse: Martin Baker

Tina Baker was a British woman who disappeared in July 2002. Her husband Martin was convicted of her murder in 2006.

Baker had separated from her husband in May 2002, and she had asked her husband Martin for a divorce. In July, Baker left her new partner's home, saying that she was going to feed the animals at Brookfield farm, which she and her husband co-owned. She disappeared and Martin was eventually arrested for her murder. Martin had reportedly threatened his first wife, Gillian Hopkins, that he would to kill her and feed her to the pigs before their divorce. Baker's remains were never found, but Martin is suspected of having fed the remains to animals.

== Background ==
In May 2002 Tina Baker had rekindled a relationship with an old schoolfriend and separated from her husband. She had also asked her husband Martin for a divorce.

== Disappearance ==
She left her new partner's home on the day she disappeared, saying that she was going to feed the animals at Brookfield farm, which she and her husband owned. The farm was near Chobham. Her pet dog was found abandoned and her bank account was untouched. She was last seen in Sunbury on 8 July 2002.

== Investigation ==
Her disappearance was initially treated as a missing persons case, but police became suspicious of her husband. Sniffer dogs had been used to search the farm for her remains, but they failed to find them. In October 2005 he was arrested and charged with his wife's murder.

== Trial ==
During the trial his first wife, Gillian Hopkins, testified that he had threatened to kill her and feed her to the pigs before their divorce. Pig swill and manure were checked for Tina's remains but they were not found.

He denied being at the farm the day Tina disappeared, but a witness testified to meeting him on the farm that day and that he was agitated and made them feel unwelcome. Telephone records placed him near the farm that morning and also that he had contacted a friend who ran a breaker's yard that could dispose of cars that day.

Martin Baker was found guilty of Tina's murder at the Old Bailey although her body was never recovered. He was sentenced to life with a minimum term of 14 years.

He had feared he would lose the £100,000 14 acre farm.

== Aftermath ==
In August 2020 police began digging at Priest Lane near Bisley. The Army and special forensic teams were also involved. Her remains were not found.

== See also ==
- List of murder convictions without a body
- List of solved missing person cases (post-2000)
