= Murder of Yolanda Panek =

Murder case in Portland, Oregon, U.S.

Yolanda Panek
- Born: June 24, 1974; Portland, Oregon, U.S.
- Died: c. July 13, 1995; Capri Motel, Portland, Oregon, U.S.
- Education: Madison High School
- Height: 6 ft 0 in (1.83 m)
- Children: 1

Yolanda Evette Panek (June 24, 1974 – c. July 13, 1995) was an American woman who vanished from the Capri Motel in Portland, Oregon. The day after she was last seen checking into the hotel, her locked car was found abandoned with her two-year-old son inside, alive. A maid at the motel who cleaned Panek's room found the mattress stripped of its sheets and soaked in blood.

Though Panek's whereabouts have never been discovered, her common-law husband, Abdur Rashid Al-Wadud, was charged and convicted of her murder in March 1996. Prior to her disappearance, Al-Wadud had threatened to murder Panek numerous times due to her not raising their son in Islam, and she contested in a restraining order against him that he had threatened to slash her throat.

In 2014, the YWCA of Portland established the Yolanda Project, a shelter for victims of domestic violence, named in Panek's honor.

== Background ==
Yolanda Evette Panek was born June 24, 1974, in Portland, Oregon. Panek was an only child. She attended James Madison High School where she was an honors student and star athlete, holding the school's shotput record and being voted "most inspirational." As a teenager, Panek was granted the title of Rose festival princess at the Portland Rose Festival. After graduating high school, Panek ran a program tutoring local female students in mathematics and science at the YWCA in Portland.

Panek married Abdur Rashid Al-Wadud (also known as Darryl Deveraux) in an unsanctioned Muslim marriage ceremony in 1993, and the two gave birth to a son, Sayid, in 1993. The two had a tempestuous relationship, with Panek filing a restraining order, claiming Al-Wadud was physically abusive and had tried to strangle her. In her restraining order, Panek wrote: "He has told me that as a Muslim he has consulted with others who advised him to follow the 'law of the land', but if that were not the case, he would slit my throat, and that would be justified." In June 1995, Al-Wadud graduated from Portland State University and was purportedly seeking work in California, having previously worked in the composition department of The Oregonian.

== Disappearance ==
On July 13, 1995, Panek checked into a second-floor room at the Capri Motel with her 2-year-old son in the 1500 block of Northeast 83rd Street in Portland. This was the last time she was seen. The following morning, a maid at the motel found the room in disarray, with the sheets stripped from both beds, the towels missing, and the mattress soaked through with blood. At approximately 7:00 a.m. on July 14, Panek's 1994 Dodge Spirit was discovered abandoned near a Greyhound bus station, locked, with her son inside, alive. Blood was found in the trunk of the car as well as its interior.

== Investigation ==
Upon inspecting the motel room, law enforcement found blood smeared on the sidewalk outside Panek's motel room window, and the beds' bloodied linens inside the motel's garbage bin. Also found in the trash were a piece of cut electric cord from the room, as well as Panek's shoes, socks, and tank top.

=== Arrest and trial ===
Abdur Rashid Al-Wadud

Within the week after her disappearance, a warrant for Al-Wadud's arrest was placed, charging him with the first-degree murder of Panek. He was tracked to his mother's home in East Palo Alto, California, where he was arrested by authorities on July 20 and extradited to Oregon.

The trial commenced in March 1996. The prosecution contested that Al-Wadud murdered Panek over her unwillingness to raise their son in the Muslim faith, as well as a fear that she had aborted another pregnancy without his knowledge. The prosecution theorized that Al-Wadud murdered Panek by slashing her throat in the motel room before throwing her body out the window, and subsequently placing it in the trunk of her car before disposing of it.

In May 1996, Al-Wadud was convicted and sentenced to life imprisonment in Panek's murder, despite the fact that no body could be found. The jury deliberated for only one hour before returning a guilty verdict. Despite his conviction, Al-Wadud proclaimed his innocence.

== Aftermath ==
Panek's mother, Susan, moved by the lengths the prosecuting attorney, Rodney Underhill, went to obtain a conviction, renamed her grandson Rodney in his honor. In 2000, Susan wrote a public letter protesting Oregon Measure 94, a proposed measure that would result in re-sentencing of crimes convicted under the previously-passed Measure 11, which added minimum mandatory sentences for certain violent crimes and sex offenses.

Panek's name is included on the Parents of Murdered Children Memorial, dedicated in 2013.

In commemoration of the 20th anniversary of the Violence Against Women Act (VAWA) in 2014, the Obama Administration published a report which included numerous programs supported by the VAWA, including the Yolanda Project, a shelter-based program established in 2014 and affiliated with the YWCA of Portland.

== See also ==
- List of solved missing person cases: 1990s
