= Robyn Lindholm =

Stripper and suspected serial killer (born 1973)

Robyn Jane Lindholm (born 8 March 1973) is an Australian former stripper and suspected serial killer. She has been convicted of murdering two former boyfriends, and is a person of interest in the case of Shari Davison, an exotic dancer who disappeared in 1995. She will be eligible for parole in 2049, at the age of 76.

== Early life ==
Lindholm attended Kilvington Grammar School and Monash University. As a teenager she was an accomplished ice skater, winning the Victorian Championship for ice-skating in 1986, however an injury ended her career.

== Shari Davison ==
On February 18, 1995, Davison failed to show up for work. Three days later she was reported missing. She was 27 years old at the time of her disappearance. In 2020, the police confirmed they suspected Davison was murdered, and a reward of $1 million is offered for information regarding her disappearance.

Davison worked for the same stripper agency as Lindholm. She also lived with an associate of George Templeton.

== Wayne Amey ==
Lindholm met Wayne Amey, a father of five, in 2003 and started living with him in 2005. They both owned a rural property. Their relationship ended in 2010. In April 2012 she unlawfully gained access to his apartment, and consequently received a 12 months community corrections order. On 11 December 2013, Amey and Lindholm were due to appear in court regarding a property dispute. However neither appellant appeared. Wayne Amey's son reported him missing when his father failed to show up to work at his gym. She asked a number of men to carry out the killing. Amey was killed by Lindholm's boyfriend, Torsten Trabert and Tarbert's friend John Ryan. All three defendants regularly used methamphetamine. On December 10, 2013, Ryan and Trabert, broke into Amey's apartment using Lindholm's card, and Amey was assaulted with a baseball bat. He was then placed in the boot of a borrowed car (which they later destroyed via arson) and driven to a remote location, where he was murdered. Amey's corpse was found a week after his death. The exact cause of death was unclear, however multiple injuries, stab wounds, and lacerations were inflicted on his ribs, neck and head. All three defendants were arrested within days of the murder.

Lindholm pleaded guilty to murder. However Trabert and Ryan pleaded not guilty and blamed each other. They were subsequently convicted. Lindholm was sentenced to 25 years imprisonment, with a non-parole period of 21 years, Trabert 28 years with a non-parole period of 23 years, and Ryan 31 years, with a non-parole period of 26 years (Lindholm received leniency for pleading guilty and Trabert for providing the police with key information).

== George Templeton ==
Lindholm was in a seven-year relationship with George Templeton, until his disappearance in 2005. On 2 May 2005, the anniversary of his father's death, he consumed a large amount of Metaxa, his father's favourite brandy. He also smoked cannabis. This was the last time he was seen alive. Lindholm then accompanied her friend Matilda Burke to the latter's house. After receiving a phone call on her second mobile phone, she returned home to discover Templeton had disappeared. Lindholm at this time had secretly entered a relationship with Wayne Amey (although she later lied to the police and claimed the relationships did not overlap). It conjectured that Lindholm orchestrated this to give herself an alibi, so that her accomplice, Wayne Amey, could kill Templeton and dispose of his body. Lindholm later informed a boyfriend (who testified at her trial) that Templeton had gang-raped her and imprisoned her in a cupboard. Other witnesses gave similar account. Although there is some evidence of domestic violence by Templeton, Lindholm's counsel conceded this did not occur around the time of his death. Two weeks after Templeton's disappearance, she moved in with Amey and subsequently sold Templeton's cars and boat. Templeton's body has never been found, however bloodstains were found at his apartment. She reportedly told witnesses that his body had been disposed of in Port Phillip. Following her first murder conviction, the police renewed their investigation into Templeton's disappearance. The police discovered Lindholm had confessed to various people that her former partner had been murdered. Matilda Burke subsequently testified that Lindholm told her Amey had paid a friend to help him murder Templeton.

Lindholm was convicted of murdering Templeton in 2019. She was sentenced to 28 years in prison, half of which is served concurrently with her original sentence, and half must be served in addition to her original sentence, meaning her maximum sentence is 39 years, with a non-parole period of 30 years.

== Appeals ==
In 2016, Lindholm, Ryan and Trabert, appealed against their sentences for the murder of Mr. Amey arguing manifest excess. Ryan and Trabert also appealed on the grounds that they had received differing sentences. These appeals were dismissed by the Supreme Court of Victoria.

In 2022 Lindholm applied to the Court of Appeal to appeal against her convictions. Her application was unsuccessful. Her lawyer argued that the Crown's case against her included inadmissible evidence; although the judges accepted this, they concluded nonetheless there was "a substantial body of admissible evidence."

== Media coverage ==
Lindholm has been featured in an episode of Homicide with Ron Iddles.
