= Torre de Benavites =

Medieval defensive tower in Benavites, Valencia, Spain

- Torre de la Señoría
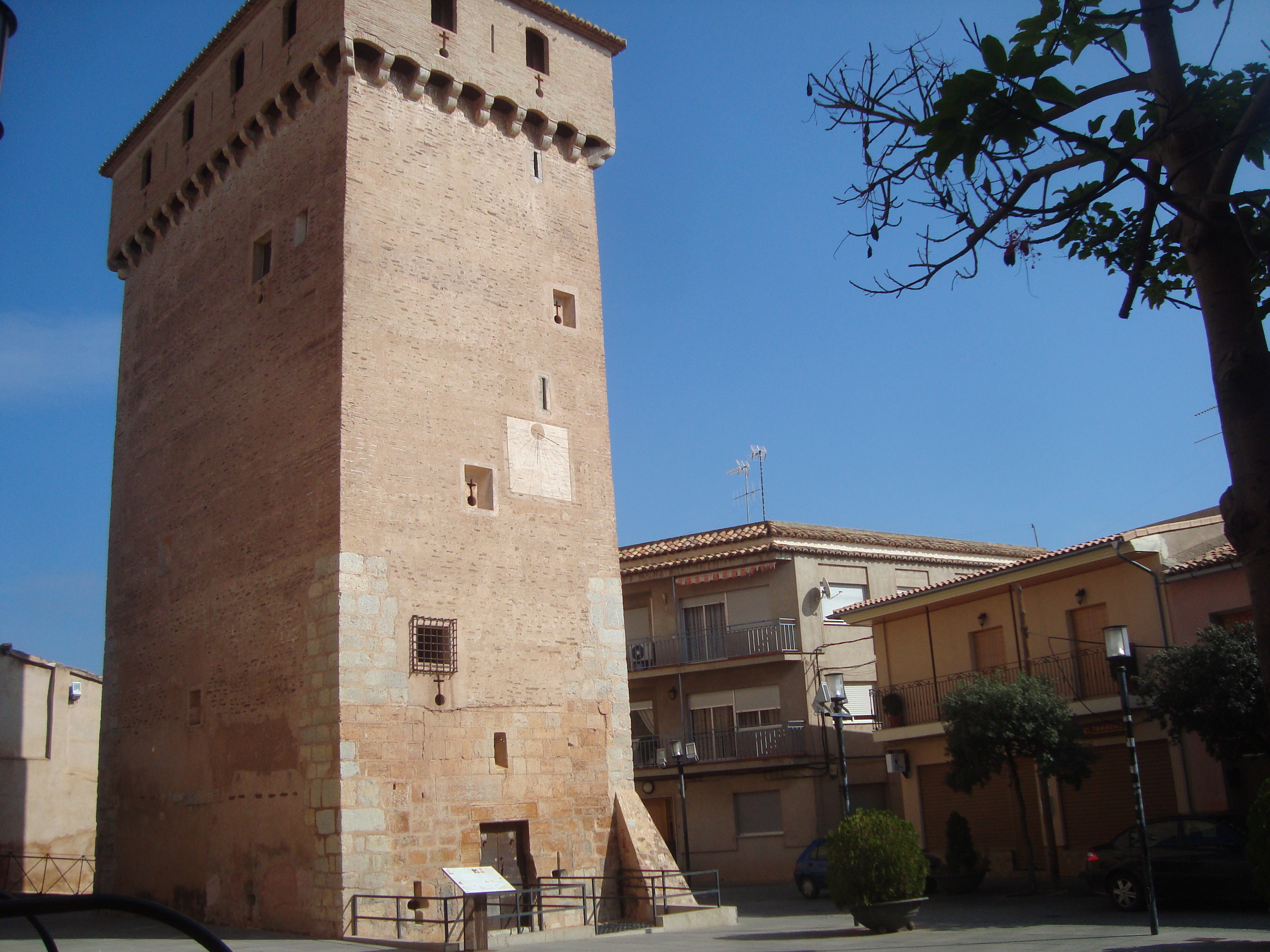
- Torre de Benavites (Valencia)
- Interactive map of the Torre de Benavites area

General information
- Type: Defensive tower
- Architectural style: Renaissance, Italian influence
- Location: Spain Benavites, Campo de Morvedre, Valencia, Spain
- Coordinates: 39°44′49″N 0°17′18″W

Height
- Height: 22.20 m

Design and construction
- Designations: Bien de Interés Cultural (1981)

The Torre de Benavites, also known as the Torre de la Señoría or Casa del Marqués de Bélgida, is a medieval defensive tower located in the centre of the village of Benavites, in the Campo de Morvedre comarca of the province of Valencia, Spain. It was declared a national historic-artistic monument on 9 January 1981 by Royal Decree 213/81, published in the BOE on 18 February 1981, and is protected as a Bien de Interés Cultural with code 46.12.052-004, annotation R-I-51-0004465. Unlike most defensive towers from the same period, it is in excellent condition. It is the most emblematic building in Benavites and the Valle de Segó.

Before its restoration, the tower faced the courtyard of the Casa Palacio and the Calle Mayor. Its dating is uncertain, and it may originally have been a Muslim watchtower serving a defensive and communication role midway between the fortified towns of Almenara to the north and Sagunto to the south.

== History ==
Although the area has undeniable Roman antecedents, Benavites likely originated from the union of various Muslim agricultural properties under the name Ibn-Abidis. After the Christian conquest, it was donated by James I of Aragon to Bernat de Matoses, passing through various owners including the city of Valencia. At the time of the tower's construction, it belonged to the counts of Almenara and Cocentaina, who also held the Palace of Cocentaina, a complex with towers built in the late 15th and early 16th centuries that share certain similarities with the Torre de Benavites. In 1624 the county of Benavites was created, elevated to a marquisate four years later. Its last lord, from 1752, was the Marquess of Belgida.

The tower's chronology spans the 14th to 16th centuries. Its current appearance suggests a later date, from the late 15th or early 16th century, placing it in the Renaissance period. The ceramic flooring from Manises likely dates from the last third of the 15th century. The Hebrew inscriptions reused as building stones in the facade and upper cornice almost certainly came from the Jewish cemetery of Morvedre (now Sagunto), and were probably not used before the expulsion of the Jews in 1492. Other Renaissance Italian influences appear in the plasterwork coffered ceiling of the first floor and in the machicolation at the top of the tower.

On 19 June 1984, due to the tower's state of abandonment and deterioration, the Direccion General del Patrimoni Artistic commissioned its restoration to architect Vicente Soriano i Alfaro of the restoration firm Vicente Menguet.

== Description ==
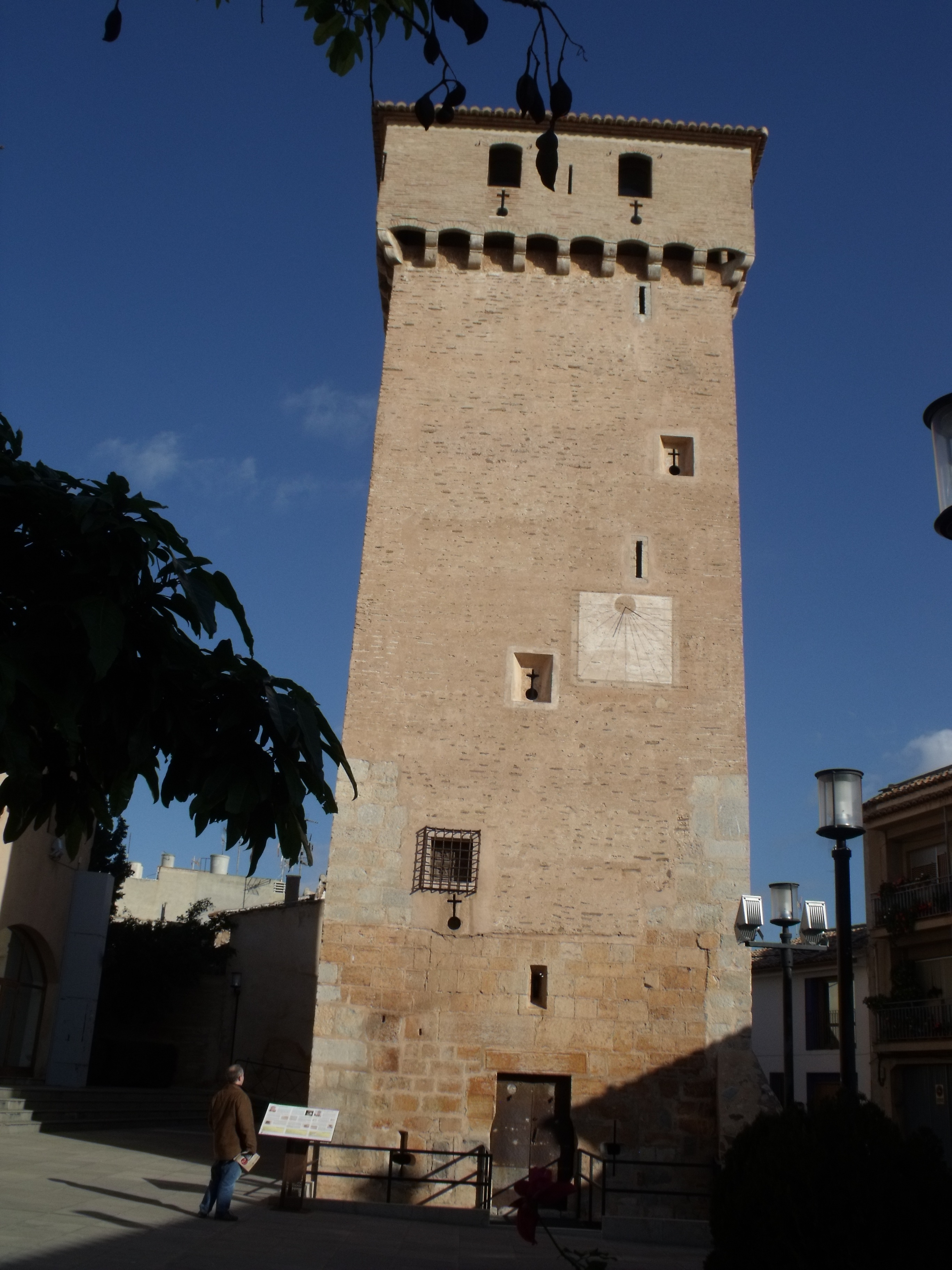
View from the Plaza del Ayuntamiento.

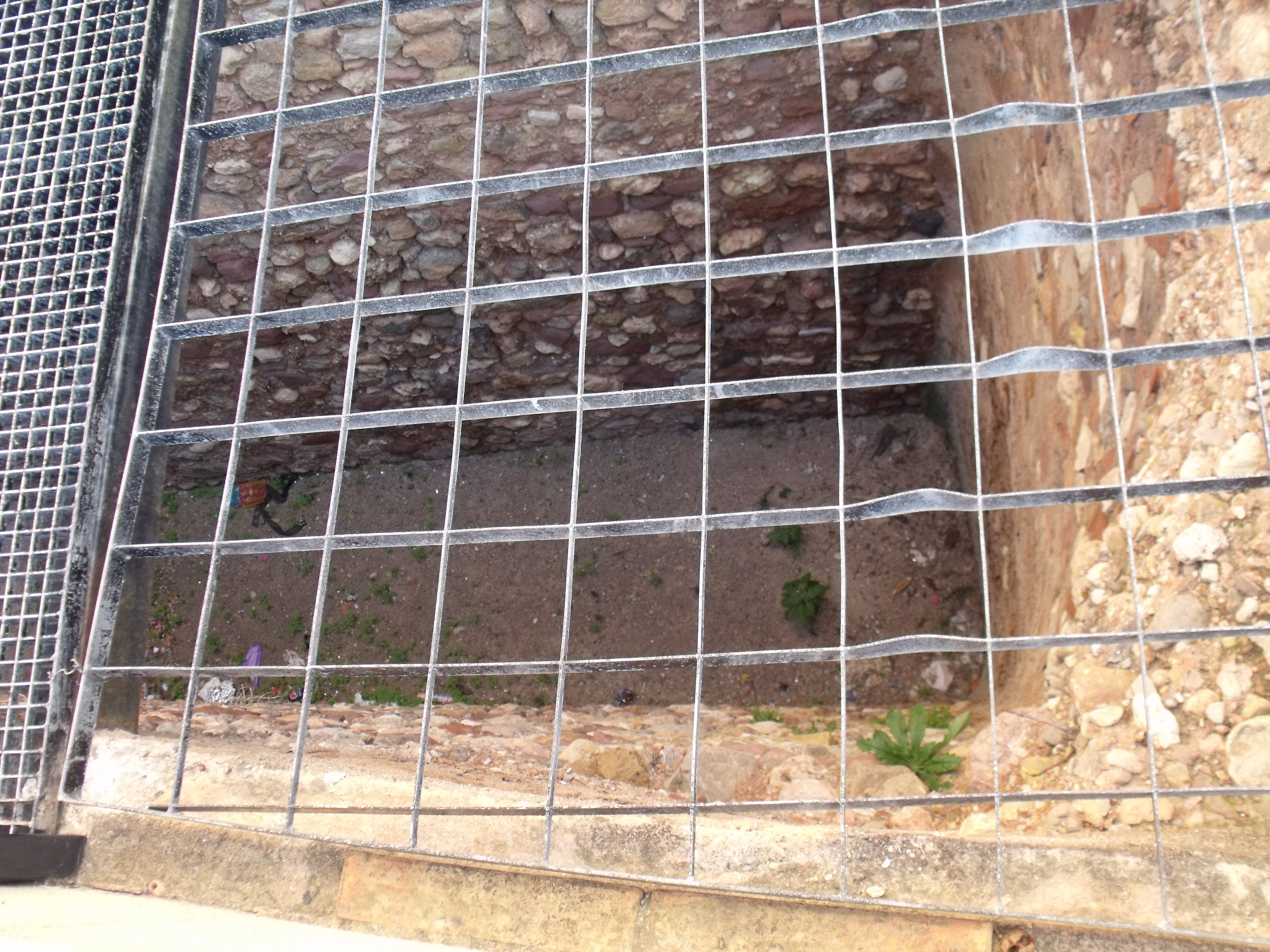
Moat.

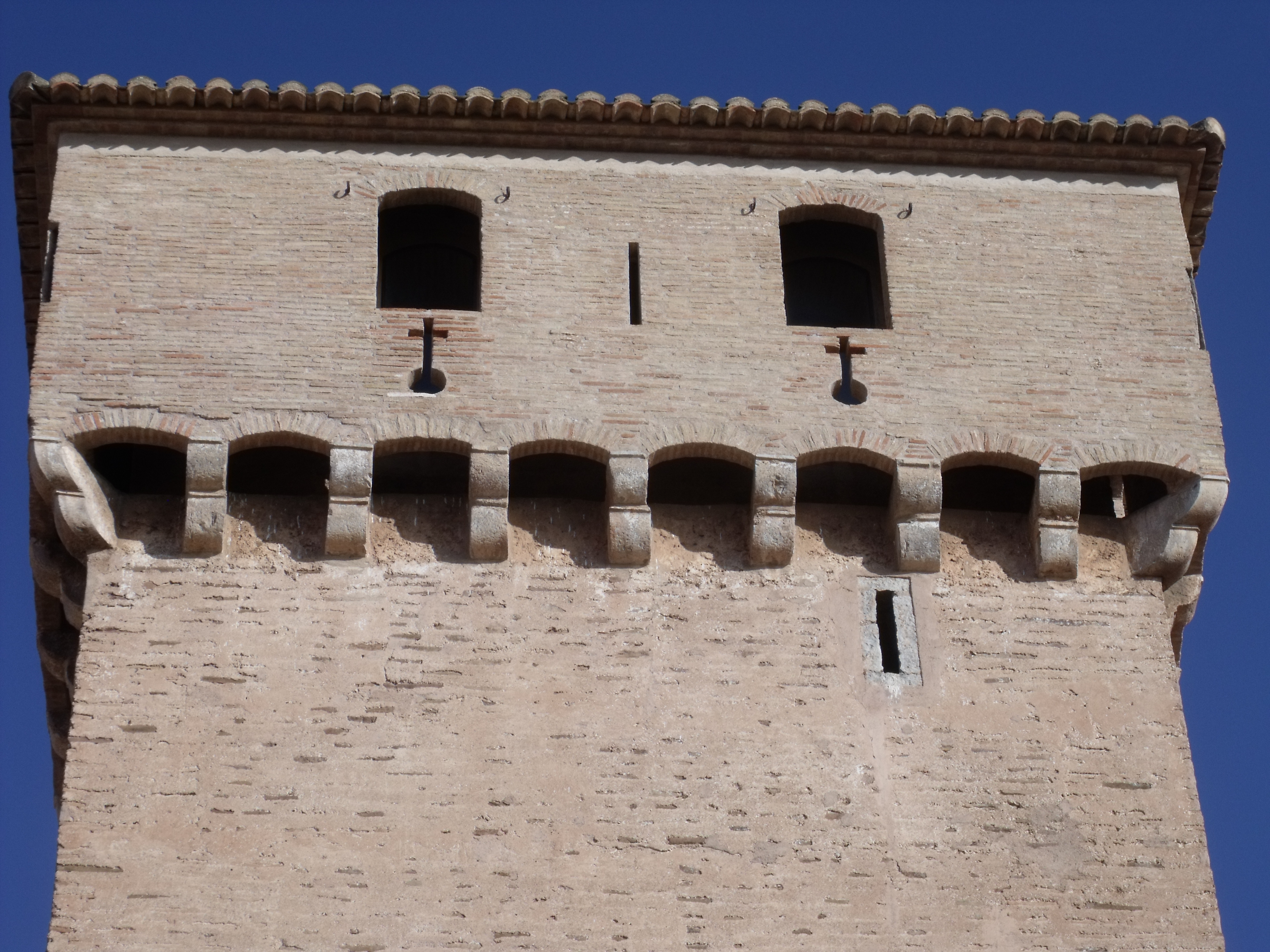
Upper section with machicolations.

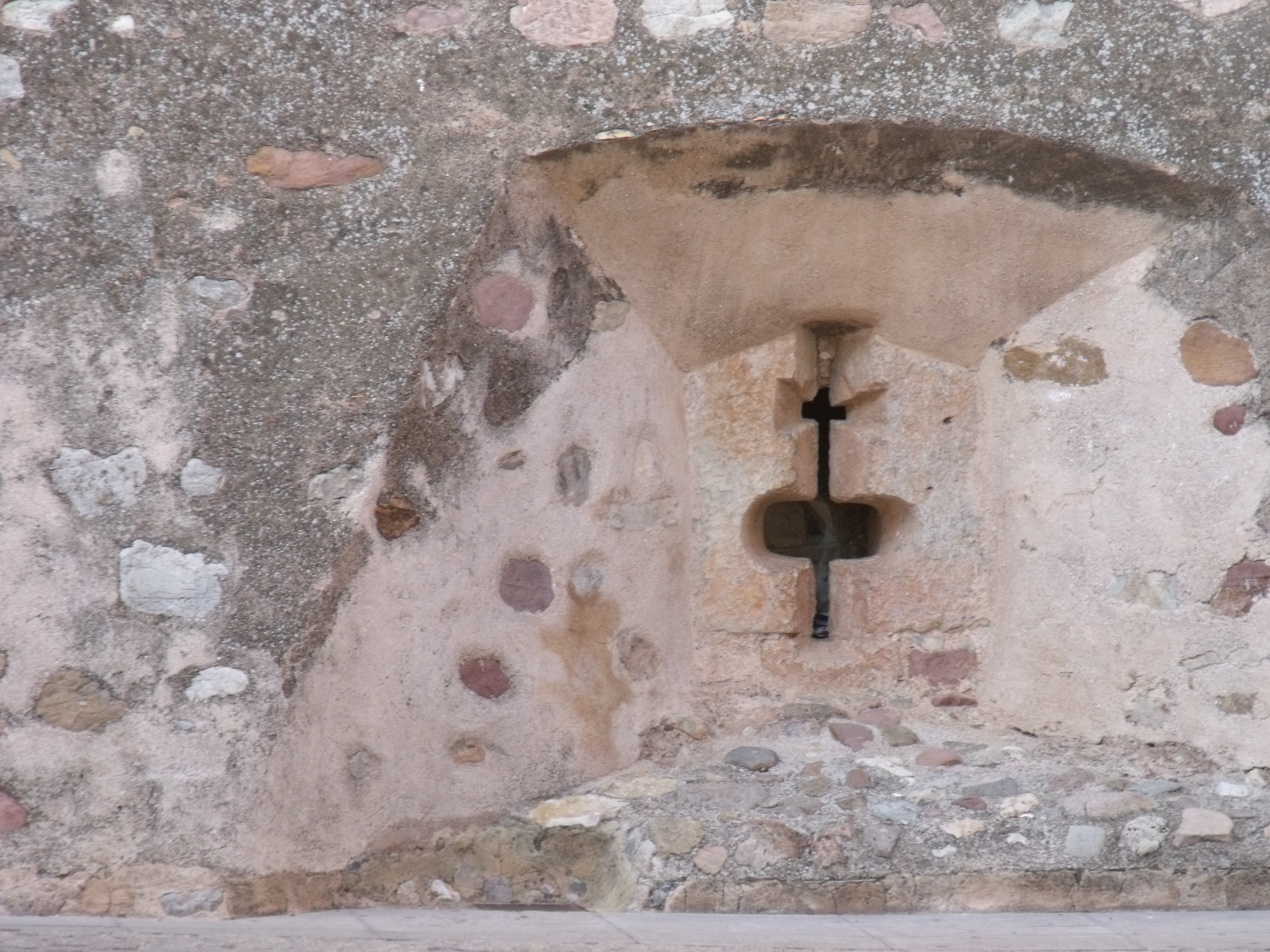
Arrow slit.

The tower has a rectangular prismatic floor plan measuring 6.75 x 11.80 metres with a height of 22.20 metres. At the top, the body of the tower widens into a 60 cm machicolation, emphasising its defensive character. It is covered by a four-slope roof and is clearly prepared for the use of firearms, as evidenced by its gun loops. The south-facing entrance door is of great thickness and completely covered in iron sheeting fixed with pyramid-headed nails, while on the north side there was once an attached house. On the south facade there is a notable sundial. In front of the door lies a moat that reveals the battered base of the tower walls, crossed by a walkway. Above the door is a narrow vertical opening with an iron pulley, originally used to operate the drawbridge mechanism, which no longer exists.

The tower consists of a ground floor, a basement and four upper floors, for a total of five levels. The basement is built with mortar and a reed ceiling; in the southwest corner a sloped gallery leads to a circular brick well. This basement once had gun loops that also served for ventilation, now blocked. During the Spanish Civil War the basement served as a shelter for the local population, and the blocked doorways of two galleries that once led to the street are still visible.

The ground floor gives access to both the basement and the upper floors via a spiral staircase in the southwest corner. Each floor is divided into two rectangular rooms, one large and one smaller. The first floor features a notable coffered ceiling in Pompeian style between wooden beams, and a large barred window with a "festejador" seat facing the street.

The second floor is accessed through a mixed-line arch; its smaller room once contained a kitchen. The third floor has two rooms of larger dimensions due to the thinner walls at this height. The top floor forms a gallery that is wider than the others due to the surrounding belt of machicolations, supported on stone corbels. It has twelve windows, four on the longer facades and two on the shorter sides, and is covered by a four-slope timber roof. The windows on the upper floors are of three types:

1. Arrow slits, either rectangular or in the shape of a circle surmounted by a cross.
2. Standard windows, some with iron grilles.
3. Terrace windows, rectangular in shape with an arrow slit in their lower section.

On all floors the flooring is made of brick combined with ceramic tiles from Manises, known locally as "escarabet".

The walls are built from ashlar stone on the south facade and corners, combined with brick, while the north facade and basement use mortar and rammed earth. During construction, stones from earlier periods were reused, including two Roman inscriptions and a Hebrew funerary inscription. The Hebrew slab, believed to date from the 13th century and to have come from the Jewish cemetery of Morvedre, is considered unique in the entire Levant region of Spain, the only other comparable example being in Bejar (Salamanca). On the main facade, to the right of the entrance, there is a Roman funerary inscription carved in blue stone with an incomplete Latin text decorated with leaves and flowers.

The architectural style is Italian Renaissance, specifically Tuscan in influence, visible in the plasterwork coffered ceiling of the first floor and the machicolation crowning the tower, a feature very unusual in the Kingdom of Valencia.
