= Nicolás Santacatalina =

Spanish footballer

Personal information
- Full name: Nicolás Santacatalina Ferreres
- Date of birth: 10 August 1919
- Place of birth: Puerto de Sagunto, Valencia, Spain
- Date of death: 22 July 2004 (aged 84)
- Place of death: Castellón de la Plana, Spain
- Position: Midfielder

Senior career*
Years	Team	Apps	(Gls)
1938–1939	UD Grao		
1939–1940	Castellón		
1940–1941	Barcelona	2	(0)
1941–1944	Castellón	76	(1)
1944–1947	Sabadell	55	(2)
1947–1952	Valencia	72	(2)
1952–1953	Castellón		

International career
1947	Valencian Community	1	(0)
- * Club domestic league appearances and goals

Nicolás Santacatalina Ferreres (10 August 1919 – 22 July 2004) was a Spanish footballer who played as a midfielder for Barcelona and Valencia.

== Early life ==
Nicolás Santacatalina was born in the Valencian town of Canet d'en Berenguer in Puerto de Sagunto, on 10 August 1919, (Note: Some sources state that he was born on 14 August.) as the son of Rosa Ferreres and Eustaquio de Santa Catalina, a hard-working laborer, who had been placed as a baby in the vestibule of the church of Santa Catalina in Alzira, where he was taken in, raised, and baptized with the name of that 14th century church.

Santacatalina was raised in Puerto de Sagunto, but the misery of the Spanish Civil War forced his family of seven brothers to move to Grao de Castellón, to earn a living from the sea. Although his favourite sport was swimming, since the sea enchanted him from a young age, he started playing football thanks to his older brother Manuel, a Valencia player in the 1934–35 season, who died at an early age as a result of pneumonia caused by a cold shower.

== Playing career ==
=== First steps and Barcelona ===
Santacatalina began his football career at UD Grao in 1938, aged 19, combining this sport with his family job: fishing at sea. After only one season at Grao, he was signed by Castellón on the recommendation of former referee Rafael Tamarit. He was a defensive midfielder of great physical condition, brave, combative, fiery, and with character and personality, and his qualities did not go unnoticed by the members of the FC Barcelona Football Advisory Committee, who were in charge of recruiting players, with one of its members, the former international Agustín Sancho, recommending the signing of Santacatalina after being informed of his presence in a Sabadell-Castellón league match and observing his performances.

Santcatalina had no federation card, hence being an amateur, but Barça paid him a signing bonus of 1,500 pesetas plus another 500 a month; his family got out of trouble with that money. On 19 May 1940, he made his debut for the club in a Copa del Rey match in 1940, helping his side to a 7–0 win over Athletic FC de Palma, but at 20 years old, he was unable to find his place among so many stars, eventually playing his last game on 3 November of that year, in a La Liga fixture against RCD Espanyol at Les Corts, which ended in a 2–3 loss. After this derby defeat, the then Barça coach Josep Planas, unhappy with his work, pointed him out in front of the dressing room and said that he would not play him again, which caused Santacatalina to request a leave of absence, which was granted in June 1941. Later, speaking about the incident, he said that "there were strong words" and even that he had "grabbed the coach by the lapels", stating that his 21-year-old self "could not accept a whim of the coach".

In total, Santcatalina played 12 matches for the club, including six official competitive games.

=== Valencia ===
Santcatalina returned to Castellón for the 1941–42 season, forming one of the best defensive trios in the club's history together with Francisco Guillén and Antonio Santolaria, playing a crucial role in the great Castellón team that finished fourth in the 1942–43 top division. In the summer of 1944, the newly married Santcatalina, with several teams seeking his services, signed for Sabadell in 1944 for three years, with a good contract and a check of 105,000. He played a total of 64 games for them, including relegation to the Segunda División in the 1944–45 season, but then helped them achieve promotion back to La Liga the following year.

Santcatalina stayed loyal to Sabadell for three years until 1947, when Valencia signed him, and later that year, on 14 September, he started in the decisive match of the 1941–47 FEF President Cup, the longest tournament in the history of Spanish football, which had been in stand by since 1941 and which ended in a 4–0 loss to Atlético Madrid. However, an injury meant that he barely played during his first two seasons there, thus playing a small role in Valencia's victorious campaign at the 1948–49 Copa del Generalísimo. It was only in the third season that he managed to establish himself in the first team, playing 77 consecutive official matches, which was a record for the club at that time. Together with Tonico, he reduced his roughness and gained in precision, and his marking was excellent for several years at the Mestalla. On 12 October 1949, he started in the 1949 Copa Eva Duarte against Barcelona, helping his side to an infamous 7–4 win in extra-time.

In a duel against Athletic Bilbao in San Mamés, Santcatalina collided with José Luis Panizo in an aerial duel that cost him 12 stitches, so the first thing he did when he returned to the field was to ask about his wellbeing. On another occasion, in a match against Gimnàstic de Tarragona, Santacatalina did not allow himself to be treated even when bleeding, so the Civil Governor of Tarragona, who was present in the stands, stopped the match for him to be treated. And in a match in Alicante, he was arrested for putting his hands on his private parts after being insulted from the stands and being seen doing so by the wife of that city's Civil Governor. Pasieguito's arrival at Valencia relegated Nicolás to the background, but he accepted the substitute roles always with professionalism.

=== Later career ===
In 1952, the 33-year-old Santcatalina again returned to Castellón, where he played his last matches in the 1952–53 season, all of them in the fight to remain in the Second Division, which they failed to achieve. In total, Santacatalina scored four goals in 188 La Liga matches.

== Later and personal life ==
Santacatalina remained linked to Castellón as a scout and 'spy' for future rivals, but he eventually returned to his origins in Grau, where he continued to be linked to sea work and later became a fish transporter.

During his time at Barça, Emilio Fabregat, who later became president of Castellón, always intervened in his favour; in return, Santacatalina later helped Fabregat to revive his business in a positive way. He married one of Emilio's sisters, Purificación Fabregat, in Grau, on 22 May 1943. The couple had three children, Dunia, Emilio, and Carla, with their only son playing for the Castellón reserve team before dying in a traffic accident in 1972, at the age of only 23.

In 1961, Dunia was already the queen of the Sant Pere Festival, and in the following year, she was the Lady of the City in Magdalena Festival.

== Death ==
Santacatalina lived out his final years in Castellón de la Plana, where he died on 22 July 2004, at the age of 84.

== Legacy ==
His sporting legacy was continued by one of his nephews, David Navarro, a native of Puerto de Sagunto, was champion of the League, the 2003–04 UEFA Cup, and the 2004 UEFA Super Cup with Valencia.

== Honours ==
Sabadell

- Segunda División:
  - Champions (1): 1945–46

Valencia CF

Copa del Rey:

- Champions (1): 1948–49

Copa Eva Duarte:

- Champions (1): 1949

FEF President Cup

- Runner-up (1): 1941–47
