= Vicky Sevilla =

Spanish chef (born 1992)

- Born: Victoria Sevilla Vázquez; March 28, 1992 (age 34); Quart de les Valls, Valencia, Spain
- Culinary career
- Cooking style: Mediterranean
- Ratings: One Michelin star; One Sol, Repsol Guide
- Current restaurant: Arrels (Sagunto)
- Awards won: New Talent of the Year, La Liste Mediterranean (2023); Best Chef of the Year, Academy of Gastronomy of the Valencian Community (2023); Prix au Chef de l'Avenir, Académie Internationale de la Gastronomie (2026)

Victoria Sevilla Vázquez (born 28 March 1992), known professionally as Vicky Sevilla, is a Spanish chef. Born in Quart de les Valls, in the province of Valencia, she came to cooking after taking a job at a beach bar in Formentera as a teenager, and afterwards trained at the hospitality school of Castellón. In 2017 she opened Arrels in Sagunto, in the former stables of a medieval palace, and has led it as owner and head chef since then. Arrels received a Michelin star in December 2021, when Sevilla was 29, making her the youngest woman in Spain to obtain the distinction. It has kept the star in later editions of the guide, including the 2026 selection. The restaurant also holds one Sol from the Repsol Guide, and Sevilla's other distinctions include the La Liste Mediterranean New Talent of the Year award and the Prix au Chef de l'Avenir.

== Early life and training ==
Sevilla has said that she came to cooking by chance. At 17, going through a difficult period, she travelled to Formentera to visit a friend and had to find work there; she took a job in a kitchen without knowing how to fry an egg, was running the cold station four months later, and has said that "cooking saved me". She then trained at the hospitality school of Castellón. The accommodation she had been promised on the island did not materialise and she slept on a bed improvised from pallets; she stayed for two seasons in a kitchen she has described as harsh, on one occasion being made to clean a freezer at −40 °C as a punishment, and later opened her own restaurant with a state-backed ICO loan and, as she has stressed, without partners or investors. The Formentera restaurant served some 300 covers per service, in contrast with the 25 places of her own dining room.

Back on the mainland she cooked under three Valencian chefs whom she has repeatedly credited: Susi Díaz, at La Finca in Elche, from whom she says she learned the value of doing things properly; Begoña Rodrigo, at La Salita in Valencia, whom she describes as a mirror to look into; and Vicente Patiño, at Saiti in Valencia, with whom she learned everything from management to pastry. The gastronomy magazine 7 Caníbales has described Patiño in particular as her master.

== Career ==
=== Arrels ===
Sevilla opened Arrels on 12 October 2017, at the age of 25. The restaurant serves a tasting menu that changes with the season, so that diners do not know in advance what they will be eating; she has said that she works with humble, local and seasonal products and reinterprets traditional recipes with a good deal of freedom. It stands at Calle Castillo 18, in the old town of Sagunto on the way up to the castle, in the former stables of the medieval palace of the Dukes of Gaeta, a space whose Gothic, Mozarabic and Romanesque stone arches were preserved in the dining room.

Its name means "roots" in Valencian language. The offer is built around three menus, a weekday lunchtime option and the longer Saba and Arrels, the last two with vegetarian versions, and the raised upper part of the dining room holds an island where the chef finishes the first dessert in front of the guests. The restaurant began by serving set menus at 15 euros and raised its prices only gradually, an approach Sevilla has defended as the sensible one for a small town, working with humble produce treated as carefully as if it were caviar; by 2022 its longest menu cost 92 euros.

=== Michelin star ===
Arrels first entered the Michelin Guide in the 2020 selection, in the Bib Gourmand category for good value, with the inspectors highlighting its technical cooking and the presentation of its dishes.

The gala presenting the MICHELIN Guide Spain & Portugal 2022 was held on 14 December 2021 at the auditorium of the Palau de les Arts Reina Sofía in Valencia, the first time the city had hosted the ceremony. Arrels was among the restaurants awarded a first star at the ceremony; the mayor of Sagunto, Darío Moreno, described the award as "a milestone" in the history of the municipality. Sevilla said afterwards that she had been overwhelmed and that the award reflected the work of the whole team. The restaurant kept its star in the 2024 selection, announced in Barcelona in November 2023, when it was the only starred restaurant in the province of Valencia outside the provincial capital.

== Awards and recognition ==
In 2018, a year after opening Arrels, Sevilla was chosen Young Promise of the Valencian Community by the newspaper Levante-EMV. In January 2020 she was one of eight candidates for the Cocinero Revelación prize at the Madrid Fusión congress, decided by a secret ballot of more than eighty gastronomic experts and won by Camila Ferraro of Sobretablas in Seville, the first woman to receive it.

In March 2023 she was named New Talent of the Year at the first edition of the La Liste Mediterranean special awards, presented in Monaco at a ceremony whose honorary prize went to Alain Ducasse. In February 2024 she was chosen Chef of the Year 2023 by the Academy of Gastronomy of the Valencian Community, chaired by Belén Arias, at a gala attended by more than 500 guests.

In September 2022 the plenary of Sagunto town council approved the award of the city's Silver Medal to her, under her full name Victoria Sevilla Vázquez; the medals were presented on 9 October, the Day of the Valencian Community. In 2026 she received the Prix au Chef de l'Avenir of the Académie Internationale de la Gastronomie, an award for young cooks with a distinctive international projection; her candidacy was put forward by the Spanish Real Academia de Gastronomía, a founding member of the academy.
