= Quartell =

- Municipality
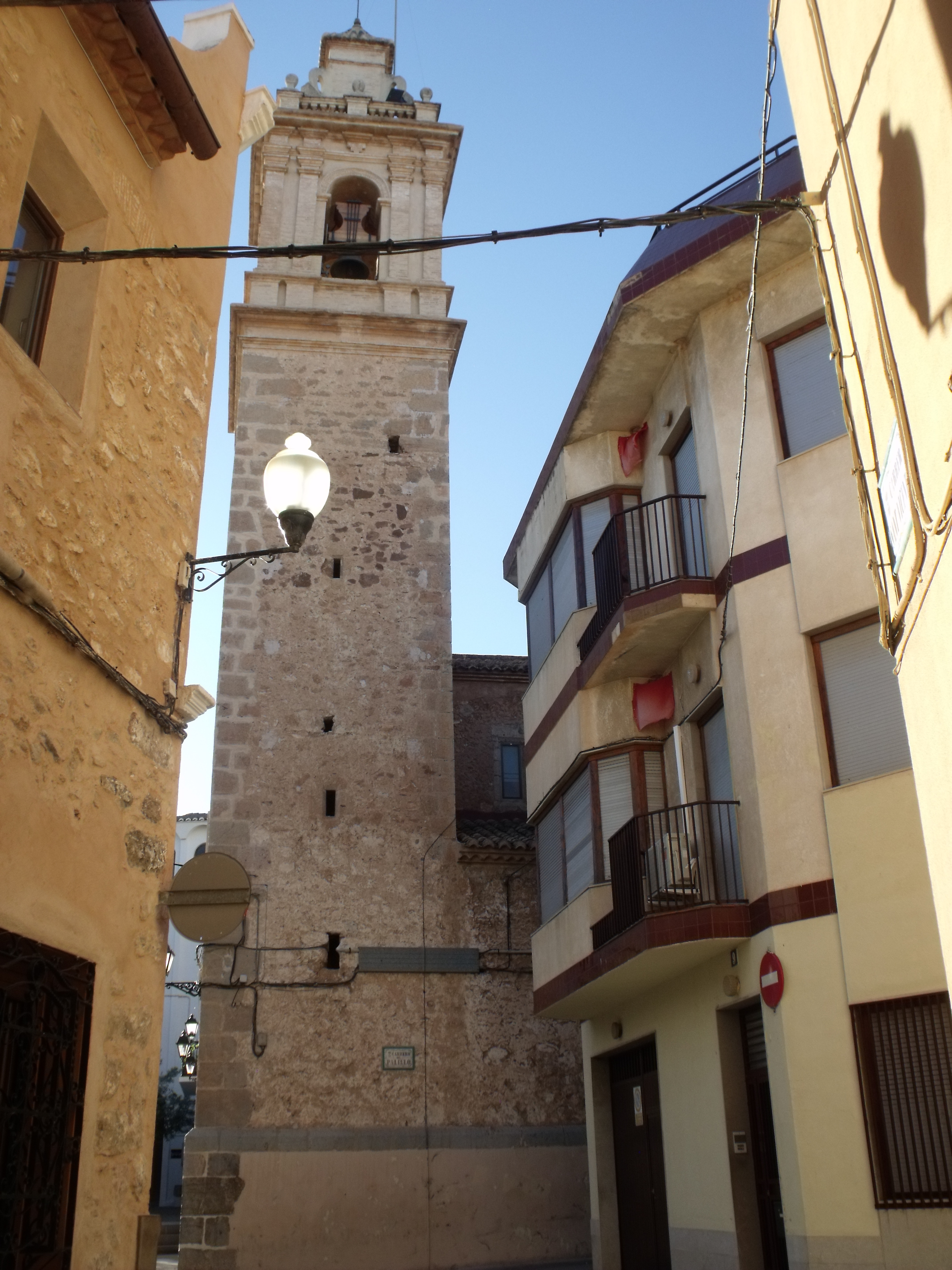

- Coat of arms

- Location in Spain
- Coordinates: 39°44′20″N 0°15′50″W
- Country: Spain
- Autonomous community: Valencian Community
- Province: Valencia
- Comarca: Camp de Morvedre
- Judicial district: Sagunto

Government
  - Alcalde: Francisco Huguet Queralt (2007) (PP)

Area
  - Total: 3.2 km^{2} (1.2 sq mi)
- Elevation: 40 m (130 ft)

Population (2025-01-01)
  - Total: 1,810
  - Density: 570/km^{2} (1,500/sq mi)
- Demonym(s): Quarteller, quartellera
- Time zone: UTC+1 (CET)
  - Summer (DST): UTC+2 (CEST)
- Postal code: 46510
- Official language(s): Valencian
- Website: Official website

Quartell is a small town and municipality in the fertile comarca of Camp de Morvedre in the Province of Valencia in eastern Spain. It is close to the sea, thirty five kilometers north of the provincial capital city Valencia, and ten kilometers north of Sagunto.

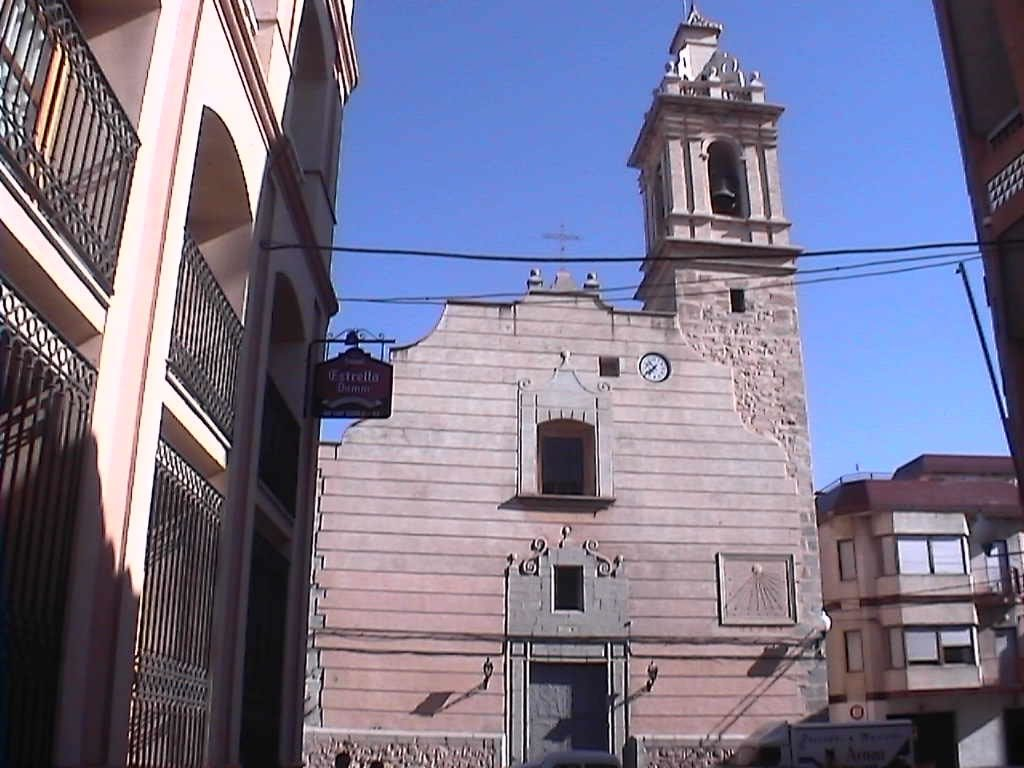
The church of Santa Ana in Quartell.

== See also ==
- List of municipalities in Valencia
