= Puerto de Sagunto =

Town in the province of Valencia, Spain

Puerto de Sagunto Port de Sagunt
- Urban core and locality
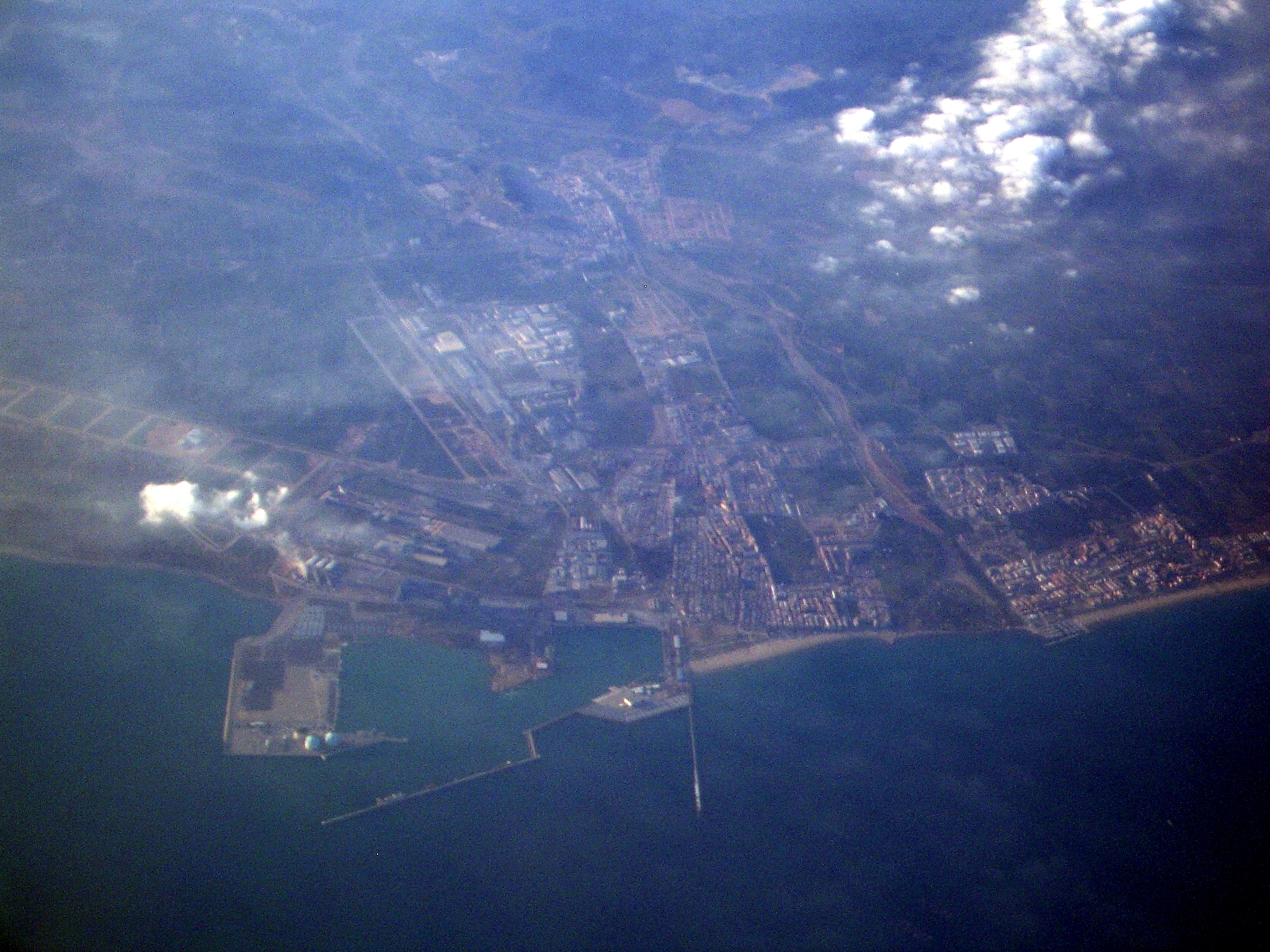
- Skyline view of Puerto de Sagunto

- Flag Coat of arms

- Puerto de Sagunto (province of Valencia) Puerto de Sagunto (Valencian Community) Puerto de Sagunto (Spain)
- Coordinates: 39°39′27″N 0°13′12″W
- Country: Spain
- Autonomous community: Valencian Community
- Province: Valencia
- Comarca: Camp de Morvedre
- Municipality: Sagunto

Government
  - Body: Ajuntament de Sagunt
  - Mayor: Darío Moreno Lerga (2019-) (PSPV-PSOE)
- Website: aytosagunto.es

Puerto de Sagunto (Note: Pronunciation of Puerto de Sagunto: Spanish: [ˈpweɾto ðe saˈɣunto]) or Port de Sagunt (Note: Pronunciation of Port de Sagunt: Valencian: [ˈpɔɾd de saˈɣunt]) is a Valencian locality pertaining to Sagunto (Valencian Community, Spain), which is located at the mouth of the Palància river and in the north of the province of Valencia. It is the largest urban nucleus in Camp de Morvedre, with 44,428 inhabitants (2019).

== Geography ==
Located 4 km east-southeast of the old town of Sagunto, it includes the central eastern part of the municipal area, from Av. Ramón y Cajal to the coast. To the north, it borders the municipality of Canet d'en Berenguer and is located to the west of the Mediterranean Sea.

== History ==
It owes its name to the locality's port, from which the industrial and commercial activity developed, which is maintained today. Already during the last third of the 20th century, the operation of the integral steel plant in Sagunto, managed by Altos Hornos del Mediterráneo (1971-1984), was key to its growth, as well as the tourist attraction of the beach of Puerto de Sagunto.

In 2017 the City Council of Sagunto, the Generalitat Valenciana and the Port Authority of Valencia agreed to build a branch of the CV-309 to provide new access to Puerto de Sagunto.

== See also ==
- Sagunto
- Canet d'en Berenguer
- Faura
