= Murder of Marta Calvo =

2019 murder in Spain

Marta Calvo Burón
- Born: 1994; Estivella, Spain
- Disappeared: 7 November 2019 (aged 25); Manuel, Spain
- Status: Murdered
- Cause of death: Jorge Ignacio Palma

Marta Calvo Burón was a 25-year-old Spanish woman who disappeared on 7 November 2019, in Manuel, Valencia after a date with a man she met on an online dating site. The man she met, Jorge Ignacio Palma, confessed to her disappearance. It later emerged that he was a serial killer responsible for other murders. He was sentenced to 159 years in prison by the Provincial Court of Valencia. Later, the Spanish Supreme Court (Tribunal Supremo) sentenced him to reviewable permanent imprisonment, while confirming additional sentences totaling 137 years for the other murders and attempted murders.

== Background ==
Marta Calvo was born in Estivella, the daughter of a construction worker and a supermarket clerk, as the eldest of two siblings.

== Disappearance ==
During the early hours of 7 November, the young woman, as usual, told her mother the location of a party she was attending: number 9 San Juan Bautista Street, in the Valencian town of Manuel in the Ribera Alta region. This house was the last place she was seen, and she did not return home after the party. In the absence of any news, her mother decided to go to the place from where her daughter had sent her last WhatsApp message to find out her whereabouts. She even spoke with Jorge Ignacio Palma, who said he did not know Marta, and subsequently absconded. After two days without any news, her mother reported Marta missing at the police station on 9 November at 9:15 p.m.

== Investigation ==
The Civil Guard's homicide unit took charge of the case, fearing the worst, while the man she had arranged to meet was missing. On 25 November, investigators were reinforced by the Homicide, Kidnapping, and Extortion section of the Civil Guard's Central Operational Unit (UCO), which deployed from Madrid to Valencia.

After initial investigations in the rented property, which had been thoroughly cleaned with bleach, the tenant, Palma, became the prime suspect. Palma's attempt to dispose of his vehicle at a scrapyard in El Puig added further suspicion.

Initially the search operation was carried out in the Albaida River, in caves and wells, with the support of the Special Group of Underwater Activities (GEAS) and with the aim of finding Calvo's body.

Palma, a Colombian on parole for drug trafficking, turned himself in on Wednesday, 4 December, at the Civil Guard barracks in Carcagente, Valencia. In his statement, he stated that the death was accidental after having sex mixed with alcohol and cocaine. When he woke up and found the young woman lifeless, he didn't know what to do; he considered suicide and finally decided to get rid of the body. To do so, he bought latex gloves, saws, plastic bags, bleach, and acid from various stores. The next day, he got rid of the body, dismembering it into pieces that he put in plastic bags and distributed among different containers in the towns of Alcira and Silla. The police immediately ordered the Guadassuar Recycling Plant to be shut down, in an attempt to find remains of the body.

Following his appearance on 10 December before Court No. 6 of Alzira, the judge confirmed Palma's provisional, communicated, and non-bailable detention.

Accompanied by Palma and dogs trained to detect biological remains, the Civil Guard again carried out an exhaustive inspection of the pipes in Manuel's bathroom, after the floor had been lifted with a pickaxe and a radial saw by City Hall workers. The investigators, agents from the Central Team of Ocular Inspections (ECIO) of the Civil Guard and the criminalistics laboratory of the Valencia Command, found remains of skin and some hair in the pipes. These samples were sent to the Madrid Criminalistics Service laboratory to see if they matched Calvo's DNA.

== Connections to other crimes ==
On 13 June 2022, the trial of Jorge Ignacio Palma, 40, an alleged serial sexual offender, began after his modus operandi was revealed. He was accused of the murder of three women and the sexual assault of eight others, all prostitutes, over a period of fifteen months, between 25 July 2018, and 7 November 2019. He would hire the services of the victim, and during sexual intercourse, he introduced high-purity cocaine vaginally and anally without their consent, causing a rapid overdose with seizures. This led to the death in the case of 32-year-old Brazilian Arliene Ramos on 24 March, who died in hospital after a week in a coma. 26-year-old Colombian Marcela Vargas, who had two young children in her native country, died on 14 June 2019, just months before the disappearance of Spanish woman Marta Calvo on 25 November.

The forensic report exposed his status as a serial killer, who acted knowing the danger of his actions, seeking sadistic pleasure in watching the victim's agony.

== Sentences ==
Palma was initially sentenced by the Provincial Court of Valencia to a total of 159 years and 11 months in prison for the murders of Calvo, Ramos, and Vargas, as well as for multiple attempted murders.

In September 2024, the Spanish Supreme Court (Tribunal Supremo) partially overturned this sentence, ruling that the murder of Calvo met the criteria for reviewable permanent imprisonment under Article 140.2 of the Spanish Criminal Code, applicable in cases of multiple murders. The Court imposed this maximum penalty for Calvo’s murder, confirmed additional sentences totaling 137 years for the murders of Ramos and Vargas and the attempted murders of six other women, and ordered Palma to pay €140,000 in compensation to Calvo’s parents.

== See also ==
- List of murder convictions without a body
- Lists of solved missing person cases
