= Sacerdos of Saguntum =

Spanish saint

Saint Sacerdos of Saguntum (d. ca. 560 AD) is a Spanish saint. He is venerated as a bishop of Saguntum (now Murviedro). He is patron saint of this town. He is said to have died of natural causes.
