= Algar de Palancia =

- Municipality
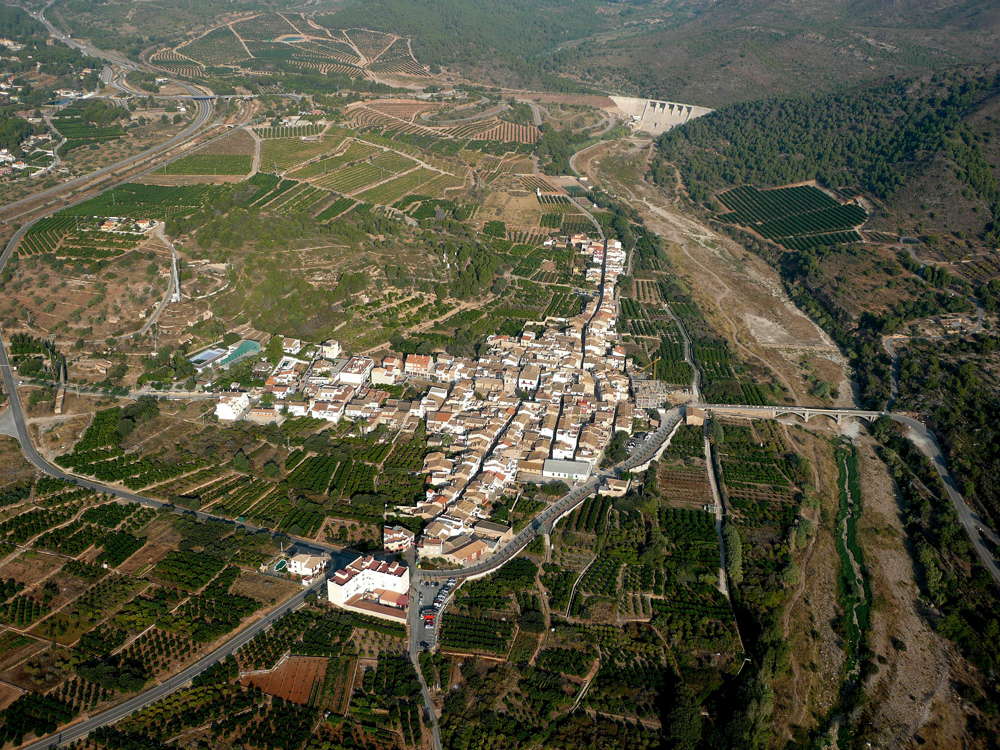

- Coat of arms

- Location in Spain
- Coordinates: 39°46′53″N 0°21′58″W
- Country: Spain
- Autonomous community: Valencian Community
- Province: Valencia
- Comarca: Camp de Morvedre
- Judicial district: Sagunto

Government
  - Alcalde: Juan Emilio Lostado Gascó

Area
  - Total: 13.20 km^{2} (5.10 sq mi)
- Elevation: 204 m (669 ft)

Population (2025-01-01)
  - Total: 565
  - Density: 42.8/km^{2} (111/sq mi)
- Demonym: Algarí/-ina
- Time zone: UTC+1 (CET)
  - Summer (DST): UTC+2 (CEST)
- Postal code: 46593
- Official language(s): Valencian
- Website: Official website

Algar de Palancia is a municipality in the comarca of Camp de Morvedre in the Valencian Community, Spain.

== See also ==
- List of municipalities in Valencia
