= Alfara =

Alfara may refer to:

- Alfara de la Baronia, village in Camp de Morvedre, Valencian Community, Spain
- Alfara de Carles, village in Baix Ebre, Catalonia
- Alfara del Patriarca, town in Horta Nord, Valencian Community, Spain
