= Manuel Santacatalina =

Spanish footballer (1914–1936)

Personal information
- Full name: Manuel Santacatalina Ferreres
- Date of birth: 1914
- Place of birth: Puerto de Sagunto, Spain
- Date of death: 9 February 1936 (aged 21–22)
- Place of death: Puerto de Sagunto, Spain
- Position: Midfielder

Senior career*
| Years | Team | Apps | (Gls) |
| 1932–1934 | SC Puerto Sagunto | | |
| 1934–1936 | Valencia | 3 | (0) |
- * Club domestic league appearances and goals

Manuel Santacatalina Ferreres (1914 – 9 February 1936) was a Spanish footballer who played as a midfielder for Valencia CF.

== Biography ==
Nicolás Santacatalina was born in Puerto de Sagunto, Valencian, in 1914, as the son of Rosa Ferreres and Eustaquio de Santa Catalina, a hard-working laborer, who had been placed as a baby in the vestibule of the church of Santa Catalina in Alzira, where he was taken in, raised, and baptized with the name of that 14th century church. It was he who enchanted the sport of football to Nicolás, one of his younger brothers, who later also played top division matches for Valencia.

Santacatalina began his career at his hometown club SC Puerto Sagunto, where he remained until 1934, when he was signed by Valencia. He was a tall, strong midfielder with a somewhat rough style of play, whom Valencia coach Antonín Fivébr tried to refine so that his technique would be similar to that of Carlos Iturraspe. He made his debut in a 4–2 loss to Sevilla in the First Division on 17 March 1935; he only played three league games that season.

Santacatalina continued with Valencia to play the following season, but he died unexpectedly of a poorly cured pneumonia on 9 February 1936, at the age of 22, just a few months before the outbreak of the Spanish Civil War. According to some media of the time, the illness was caused by a cold water shower after training; this case was quite a shock in the Valencian community and his brother Nicolás had a hard time convincing his parents to let him continue playing football.
