= Gilet, Spain =

Gilet
- Municipality
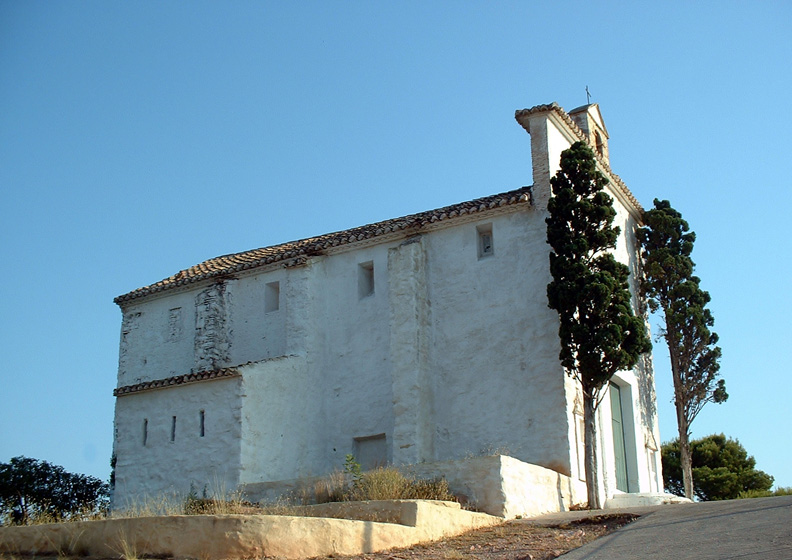
- Saint Michael's hermitage, Gilet

- Coat of arms

- Location in Spain
- Coordinates: 39°40′45″N 0°19′18″W
- Country: Spain
- Autonomous community: Valencian Community
- Province: Valencia
- Comarca: Camp de Morvedre
- Judicial district: Sagunto

Government
  - Alcalde: María Concepción Borrell Gascón

Area
  - Total: 11.3 km^{2} (4.4 sq mi)
- Elevation: 76 m (249 ft)

Population (2025-01-01)
  - Total: 4,011
  - Density: 355/km^{2} (919/sq mi)
- Demonym(s): Giletà, giletana
- Time zone: UTC+1 (CET)
  - Summer (DST): UTC+2 (CEST)
- Postal code: 46149
- Official language(s): Valencian
- Website: Official website

Gilet is a municipality in the comarca of Camp de Morvedre in the Valencian Community, Spain.

St.Enric d'Ossó i Cervelló, a Catholic priest, founder of the Society of St. Teresa od Jesus, died in the village in 1896

== See also ==
- List of municipalities in Valencia
