= Segart =

- Municipality
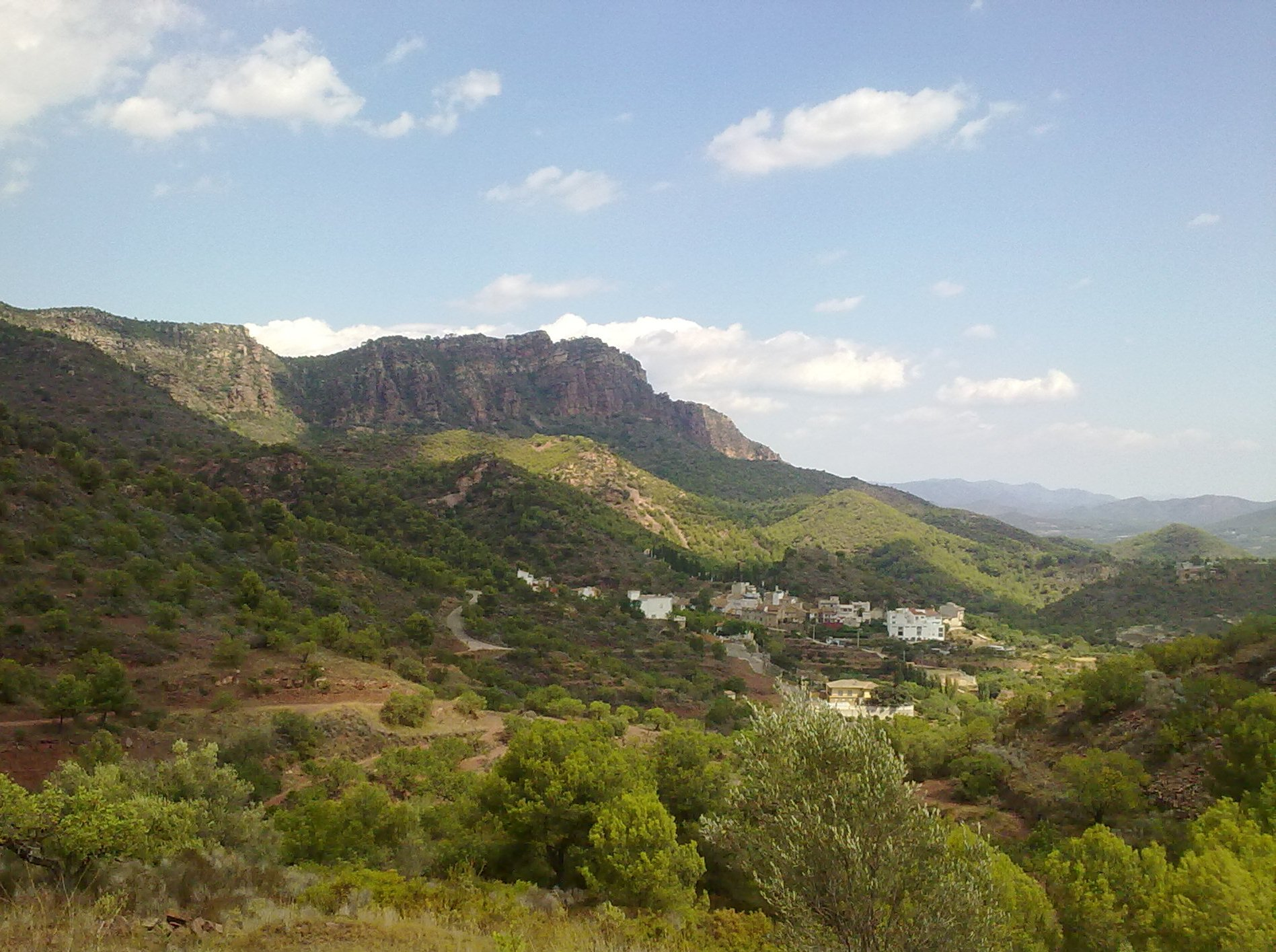

- Coat of arms

- Location in Spain
- Coordinates: 39°41′0″N 0°22′25″W
- Country: Spain
- Autonomous community: Valencian Community
- Province: Valencia
- Comarca: Camp de Morvedre
- Judicial district: Sagunt

Government
  - Mayor: Paco Garriga (JPS)

Area
  - Total: 6.60 km^{2} (2.55 sq mi)
- Elevation: 300 m (980 ft)

Population (2025-01-01)
  - Total: 180
  - Density: 27/km^{2} (71/sq mi)
- Demonym: Segartí/Segartina
- Time zone: UTC+1 (CET)
  - Summer (DST): UTC+2 (CEST)
- Postal code: 46592
- Language: Valencian (Catalan)
- Website: Official website

Segart is a town in the autonomous community of Valencia, Spain, belonging to the province of Valencia in the comarca of Camp de Morvedre. Until the mid-20th century, it was called Segart of Albalat.

== Economy ==
Economy is traditionally based on agriculture, with cultivation of olives, almonds, carob and vine. Irrigated areas grow oranges. Livestock include sheep.

== Main sights ==
- Hermitage of Segart
- Parish church, dedicated to the Immaculate Conception.
- Segart Castle, of Moorish (13th century) origins, conquered by James I of Aragon. It is situated atop a hill.
- El Garbí panoramic point ov view.

== See also ==
- List of municipalities in Valencia
