= Albalat dels Tarongers =

- Municipality
- Flag Coat of arms

- Location in Spain
- Coordinates: 39°42′10″N 0°20′16″W
- Country: Spain
- Autonomous community: Valencian Community
- Province: Valencia
- Comarca: Camp de Morvedre
- Judicial district: Sagunto

Government
  - Alcalde: Maite Pérez Furió (2015) (PSPV-PSOE)

Area
  - Total: 21.35 km^{2} (8.24 sq mi)
- Elevation: 96 m (315 ft)

Population (2025-01-01)
  - Total: 1,574
  - Density: 73.72/km^{2} (190.9/sq mi)
- Demonyms: Albalatà, Albalatana
- Time zone: UTC+1 (CET)
  - Summer (DST): UTC+2 (CEST)
- Postal code: 46591
- Official language(s): Valencian
- Website: Official website

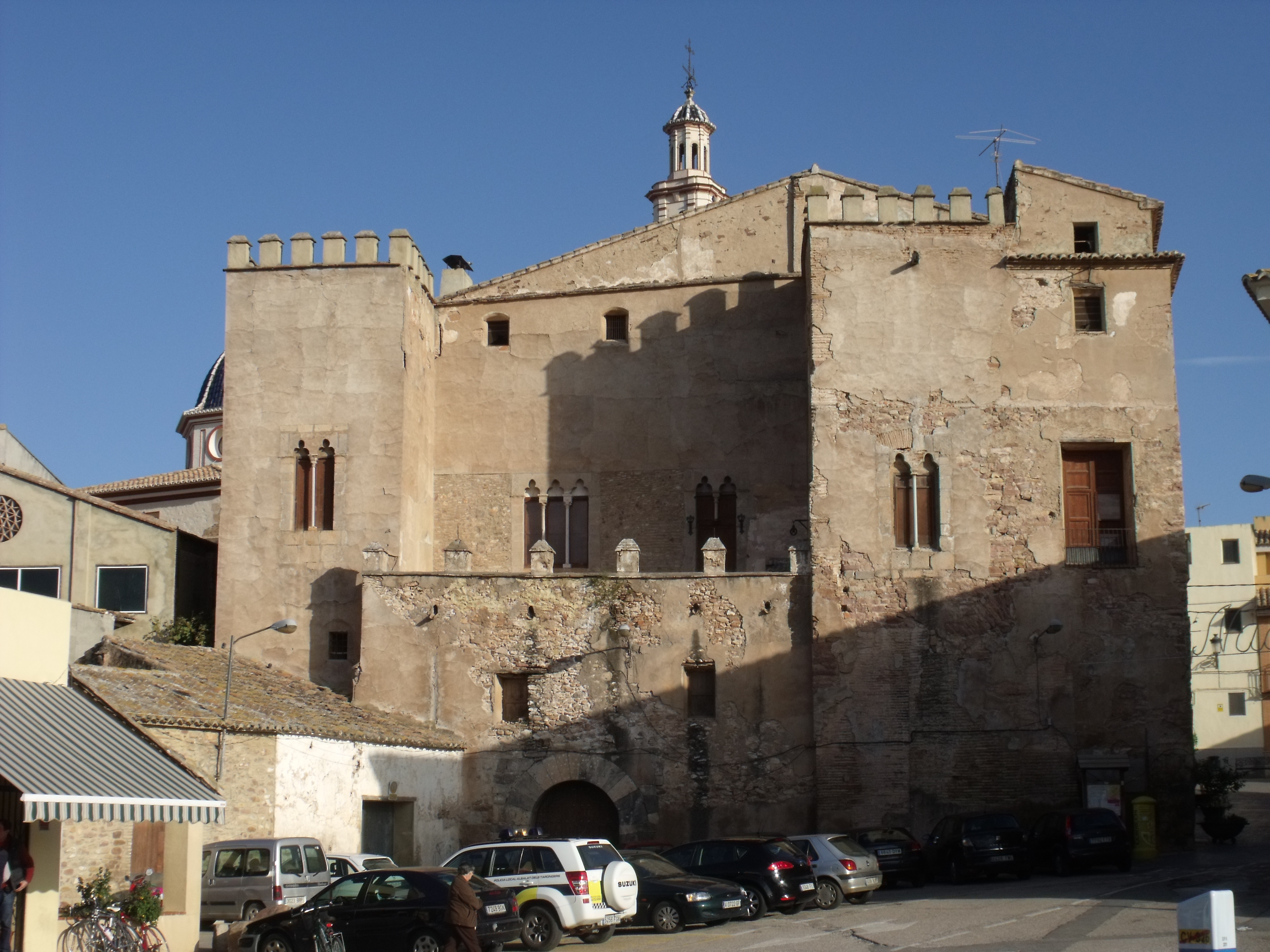
Castle-Palace of Albalat dels Tarongers, protected as Bien de Interés Cultural

Albalat dels Tarongers is a municipality in the comarca of Camp de Morvedre in the Valencian Community, Spain.

== Notable people ==
- Ángel Casero, former cyclist

== See also ==
- List of municipalities in Valencia
