= Benifairó de les Valls =

- Municipality
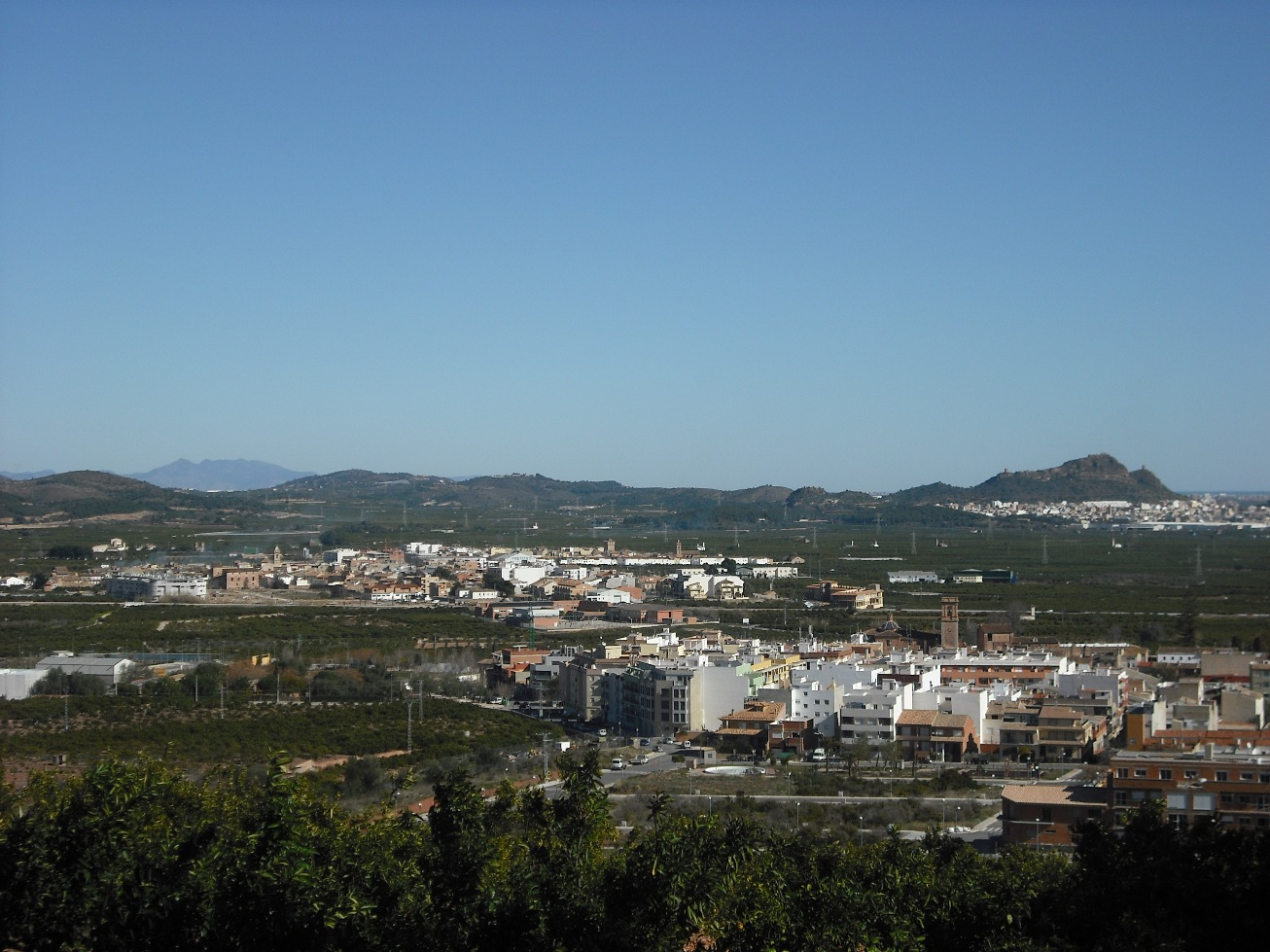

- Coat of arms

- Location in Spain
- Coordinates: 39°43′51″N 0°16′4″W
- Country: Spain
- Autonomous community: Valencian Community
- Province: Valencia
- Comarca: Camp de Morvedre
- Judicial district: Sagunto

Government
  - Alcalde: Mª Vicenta Llanes Pérez

Area
  - Total: 4.3 km^{2} (1.7 sq mi)
- Elevation: 34 m (112 ft)

Population (2025-01-01)
  - Total: 2,359
  - Density: 550/km^{2} (1,400/sq mi)
- Demonym: Benifairero/a - Rifeny
- Time zone: UTC+1 (CET)
  - Summer (DST): UTC+2 (CEST)
- Postal code: 46511
- Official language(s): Valencian
- Website: Official website

Benifairó de les Valls is a municipality in the comarca of Camp de Morvedre in the Valencian Community, Spain.

== See also ==
- List of municipalities in Valencia
