= Benavites =

- Municipality
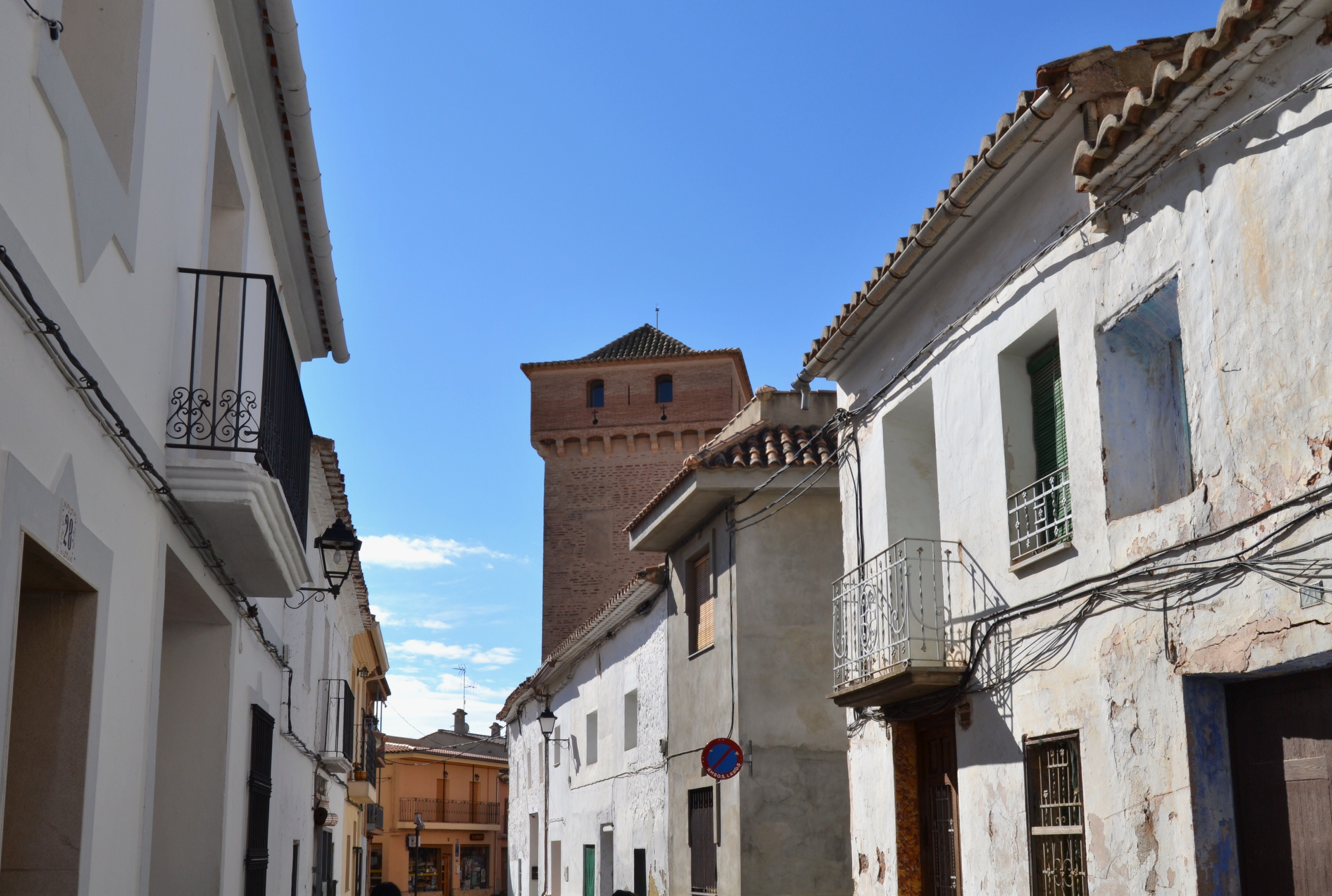

- Coat of arms

- Location in Spain
- Coordinates: 39°44′23″N 0°15′26″W
- Country: Spain
- Autonomous community: Valencian Community
- Province: Valencia
- Comarca: Camp de Morvedre
- Judicial district: Sagunto

Government
  - Alcalde: Carlos Gil Santiago

Area
  - Total: 4.3 km^{2} (1.7 sq mi)
- Elevation: 36 m (118 ft)

Population (2025-01-01)
  - Total: 652
  - Density: 150/km^{2} (390/sq mi)
- Demonym(s): Benaviter, benavitera
- Time zone: UTC+1 (CET)
  - Summer (DST): UTC+2 (CEST)
- Postal code: 46514
- Official language(s): Valencian
- Website: Official website

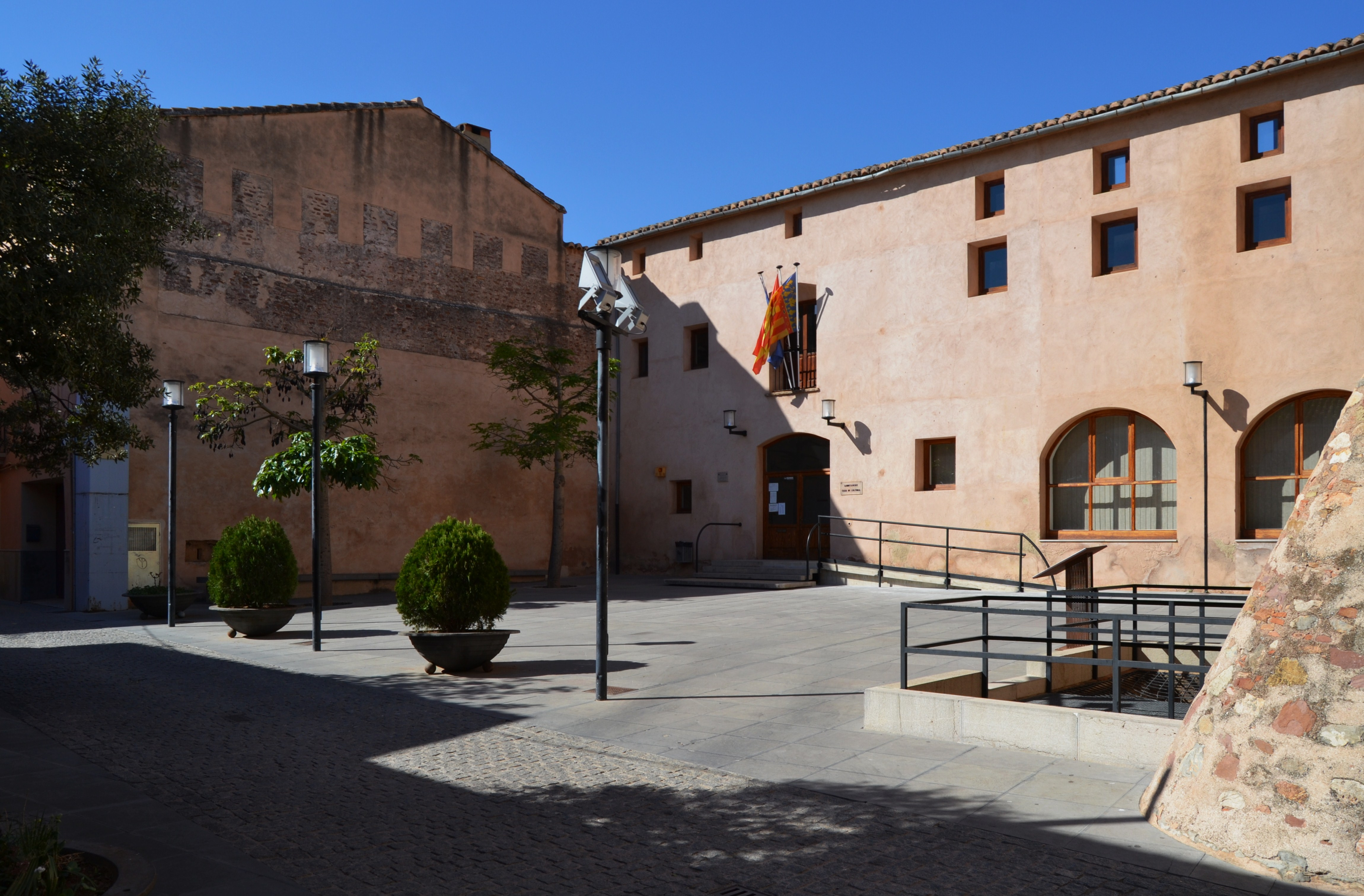
Plaça de l'ajuntament de Benavites

Benavites is a municipality in the comarca of Camp de Morvedre in the Valencian Community, Spain.

== See also ==
- List of municipalities in Valencia
