= Torres Torres =

- Municipality
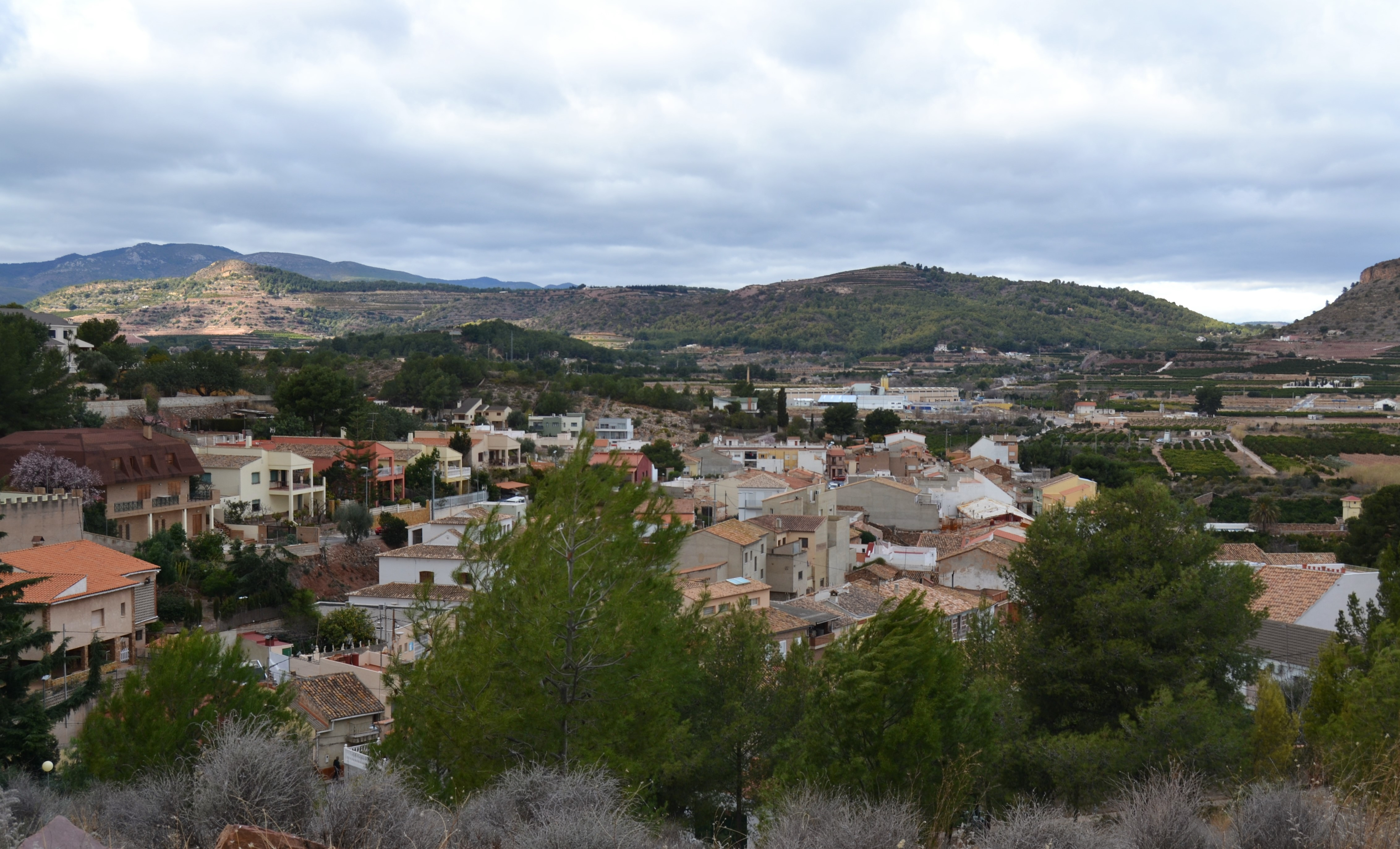

- Coat of arms

- Location in Spain
- Coordinates: 39°44′33″N 0°21′18″W
- Country: Spain
- Autonomous community: Valencian Community
- Province: Valencia
- Comarca: Camp de Morvedre
- Judicial district: Sagunto

Government
  - Alcalde: Agustín Melchor Poyo

Area
  - Total: 11.8 km^{2} (4.6 sq mi)
- Elevation: 168 m (551 ft)

Population (2025-01-01)
  - Total: 808
  - Density: 68.5/km^{2} (177/sq mi)
- Demonym(s): Torrestorrer, torrestorrera
- Time zone: UTC+1 (CET)
  - Summer (DST): UTC+2 (CEST)
- Postal code: 46148
- Official language(s): Valencian
- Website: Official website

Torres Torres is a municipality in the comarca of Camp de Morvedre in the Valencian Community, Spain.

== See also ==
- List of municipalities in Valencia
