= Jorge Ignacio Palma =

Columbian murderer and drug trafficker

- Born: Jorge Ignacio Palma J. 8 November 1981 (age 44); Ibagué, Colombia
- Other name: "The Butcher"
- Convictions: Murder x3 Drug trafficking x3 Rape ×10
- Penalty: Life imprisonment x3

Details
- Victims: 3+
- Span of crimes: 2019–2020
- Country: Spain
- State: Valencia
- Date apprehended: 2020

Jorge Ignacio Palma (born 8 November 1981), also known as The Butcher, is a murderer, rapist and serial killer responsible for the murders of three women in Spain. In November 2019, he confessed to murdering and dismembering Marta Calvo. In July 2022 he was found guilty on all counts.

Due to his modus operandi, the Spanish authorities consider him a serial killer.

== Background ==
Palma was born in the Colombian city of Ibagué. In 2004, the Spanish Civil Guard designated him as a member of a drug trafficking ring centred around Extremadura. The organization linked him and 14 other people with the drug trade, and in the end, Palma admitted responsibility, claiming to have collected the haul from Algeciras and then taken it to Llerena. For this, he was sentenced to 3 years imprisonment.

In 2008, he was arrested in Brescia, Italy for carrying and trafficking hallucinogenic substances (9 kilograms of cocaine were seized), accompanied by his grandfather and a fellow trafficker from Romania. He was additionally implicated in the trafficking of 300 grams of cocaine to Pamplona, Spain.

== Murders ==
Palma has been officially linked to the murder and subsequent dismemberment of 25-year-old prostitute Marta Calvo. After a series of investigations into the case, Palma confessed to butchering Calvo, and dumping her body parts in different garbage containers. The search for her remains is ongoing.

The authorities in Valencia, where the murder took place, are assured that Palma is responsible for several murders on the European continent, but so far has been tied to only two. One of them, a Colombian prostitute named Lady Marcela Vargas, with whom Palma had had sexual relations, was found dead in the Russafa neighbourhood. The initial cause of death was thought to be an accidental drug overdose, but it was later determined that Palma likely forced her to take it.

He has also been formally charged with the death of Brazilian prostitute Arliene Ramos. Like the other cases, she had had sexual relations and used drugs together with Palma.

== See also ==
- List of serial killers by country
