= Petrés =

- Municipality
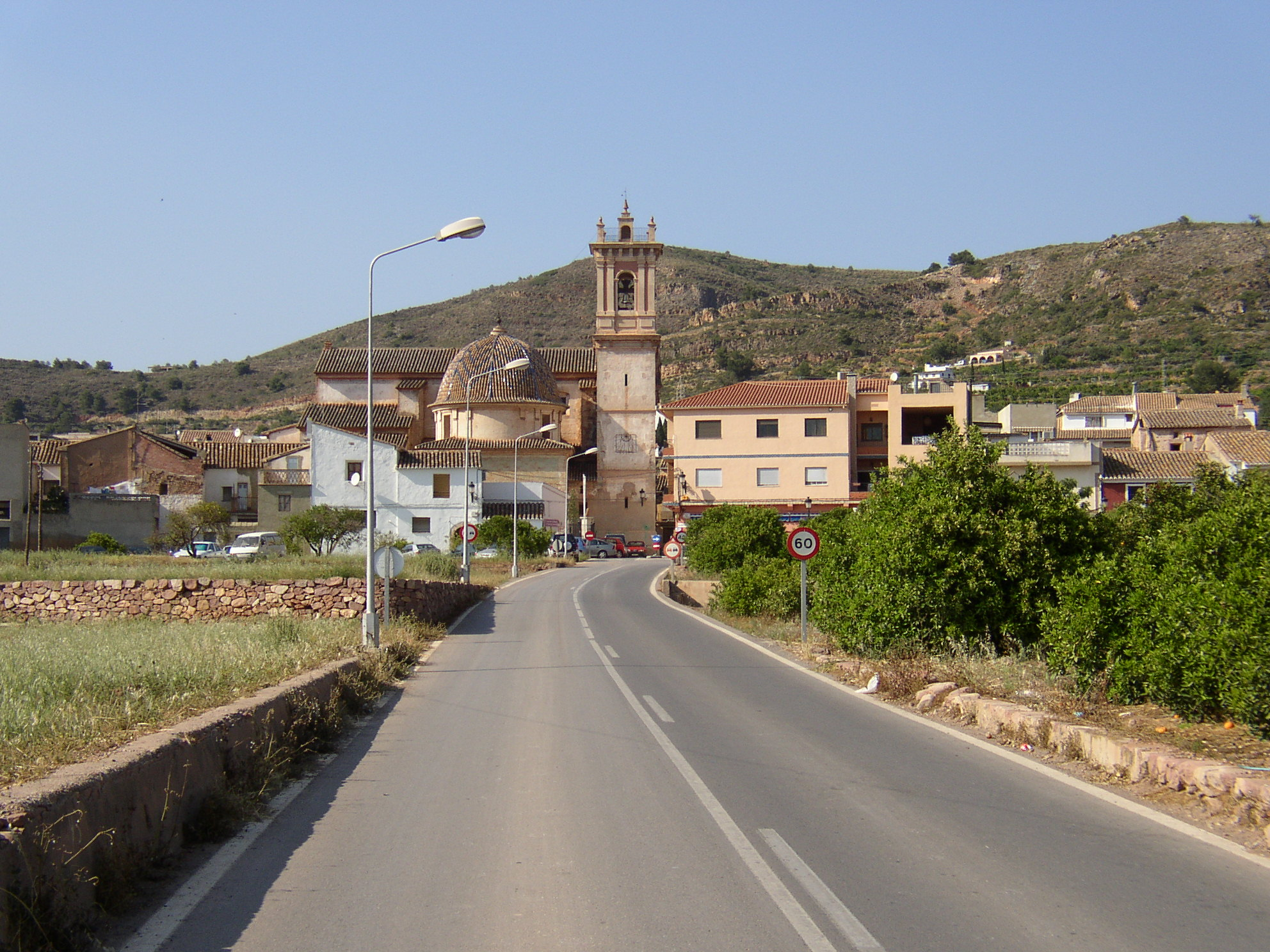

- Coat of arms

- Location in Spain
- Coordinates: 39°41′2″N 0°18′35″W
- Country: Spain
- Autonomous community: Valencian Community
- Province: Valencia
- Comarca: Camp de Morvedre
- Judicial district: Sagunto

Government
  - Alcalde: Pere Salvador Peiró (Compromís)

Area
  - Total: 1.9 km^{2} (0.73 sq mi)
- Elevation: 76 m (249 ft)

Population (2025-01-01)
  - Total: 1,124
  - Density: 590/km^{2} (1,500/sq mi)
- Demonym(s): Petresà, petresana
- Time zone: UTC+1 (CET)
  - Summer (DST): UTC+2 (CEST)
- Postal code: 46501
- Official language(s): Valencian
- Website: Official website

Petrés is a municipality in the comarca of Camp de Morvedre in the Valencian Community, Spain.

== See also ==
- List of municipalities in Valencia
