= Estivella =

- Municipality
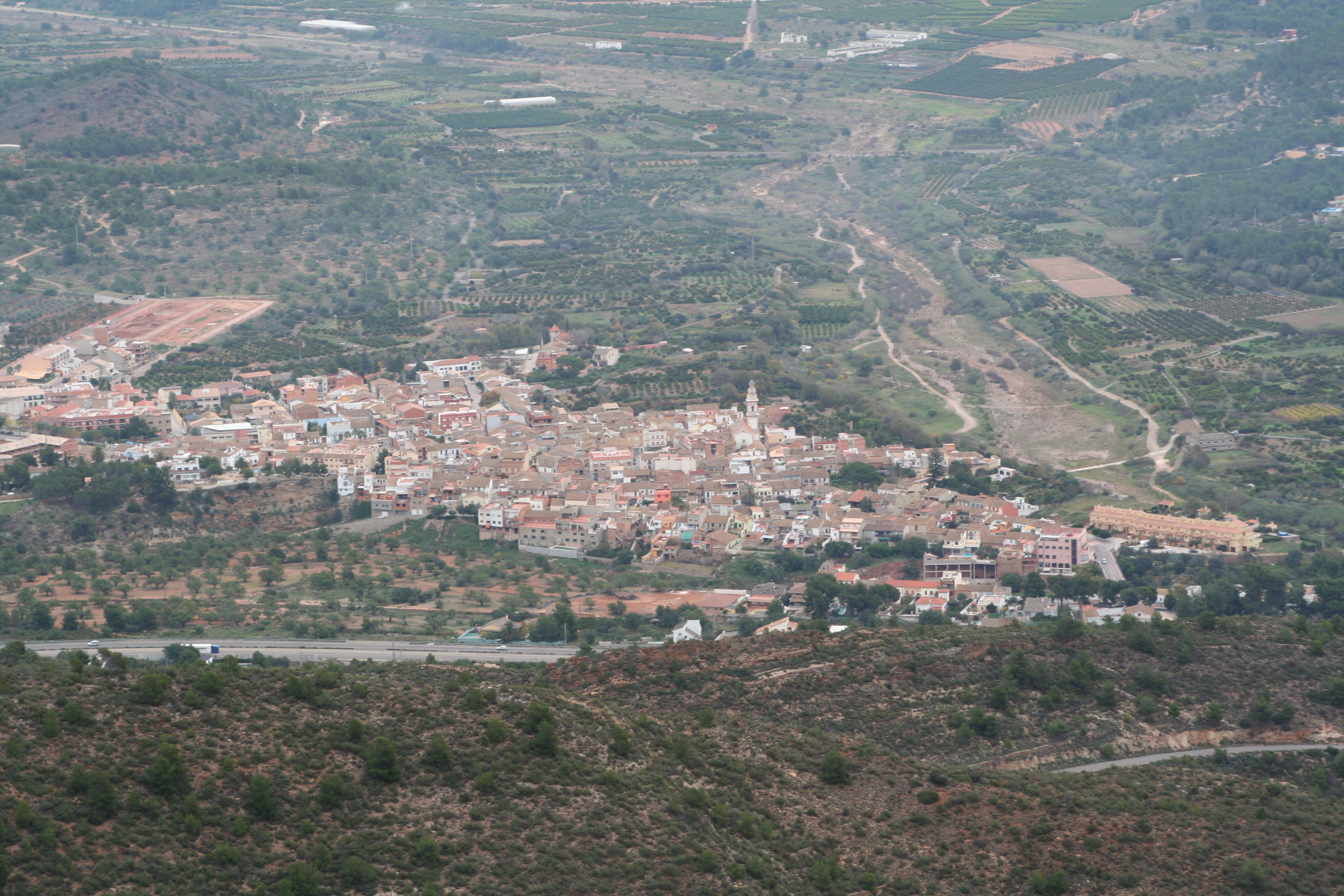

- Coat of arms

- Location in Spain
- Coordinates: 39°42′33″N 0°20′54″W
- Country: Spain
- Autonomous community: Valencian Community
- Province: Valencia
- Comarca: Camp de Morvedre
- Judicial district: Sagunto

Government
  - Alcalde: María Jesús Ramón

Area
  - Total: 20.9 km^{2} (8.1 sq mi)
- Elevation: 125 m (410 ft)

Population (2025-01-01)
  - Total: 1,710
  - Density: 81.8/km^{2} (212/sq mi)
- Demonym(s): Estivellenc, estivellenca
- Time zone: UTC+1 (CET)
  - Summer (DST): UTC+2 (CEST)
- Postal code: 46590
- Official language(s): Valencian
- Website: Official website

Estivella is a town and municipality in the province of Valencia, Spain, to the north of the provincial capital city, Valencia, near the Serra Calderona. It is surrounded by countryside, all of it planted mostly with orange trees. The climate is mild.

== See also ==
- List of municipalities in Valencia
