= Faura =

- Municipality
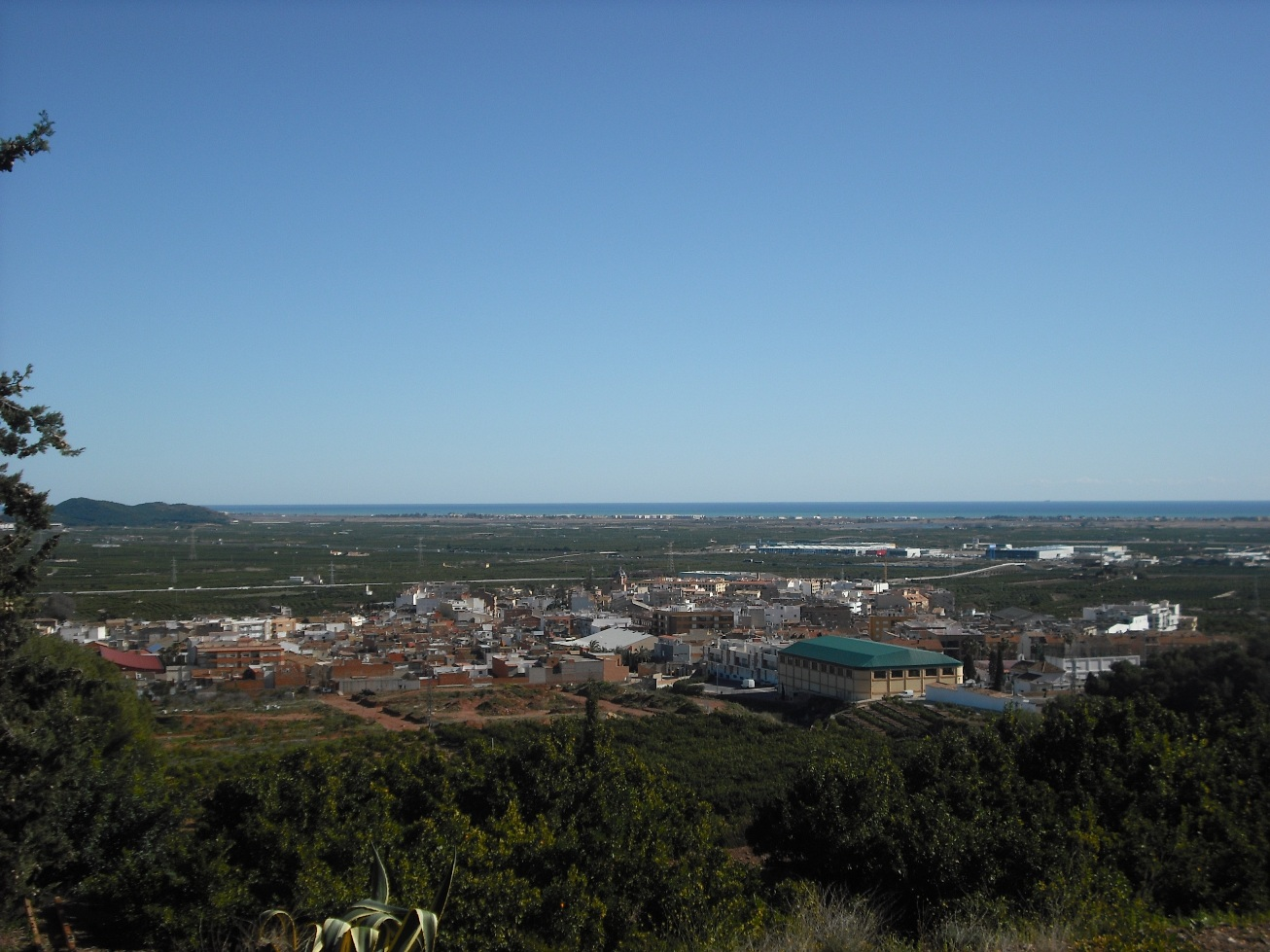

- Coat of arms

- Location in Spain
- Coordinates: 39°43′40″N 0°15′40″W
- Country: Spain
- Autonomous community: Valencian Community
- Province: Valencia
- Comarca: Camp de Morvedre
- Judicial district: Sagunto

Government
  - Alcalde: Antoni Francesc Gaspar Ramos

Area
  - Total: 1.6 km^{2} (0.62 sq mi)
- Elevation: 27 m (89 ft)

Population (2025-01-01)
  - Total: 3,753
  - Density: 2,300/km^{2} (6,100/sq mi)
- Demonym(s): Faurer, faurera
- Time zone: UTC+1 (CET)
  - Summer (DST): UTC+2 (CEST)
- Postal code: 46512
- Official language(s): Valencian
- Website: Official website

Faura is a municipality in the comarca of Camp de Morvedre in the Valencian Community, Spain.

The patron saint of this town is Saint Barbara. During some feast days there is an event in which the people of Faura hold a procession for the image of the virgin.

Faura itself lies between orange fields and has a historic past.

== See also ==
- List of municipalities in Valencia
