= Alfara de la Baronia =

- Municipality
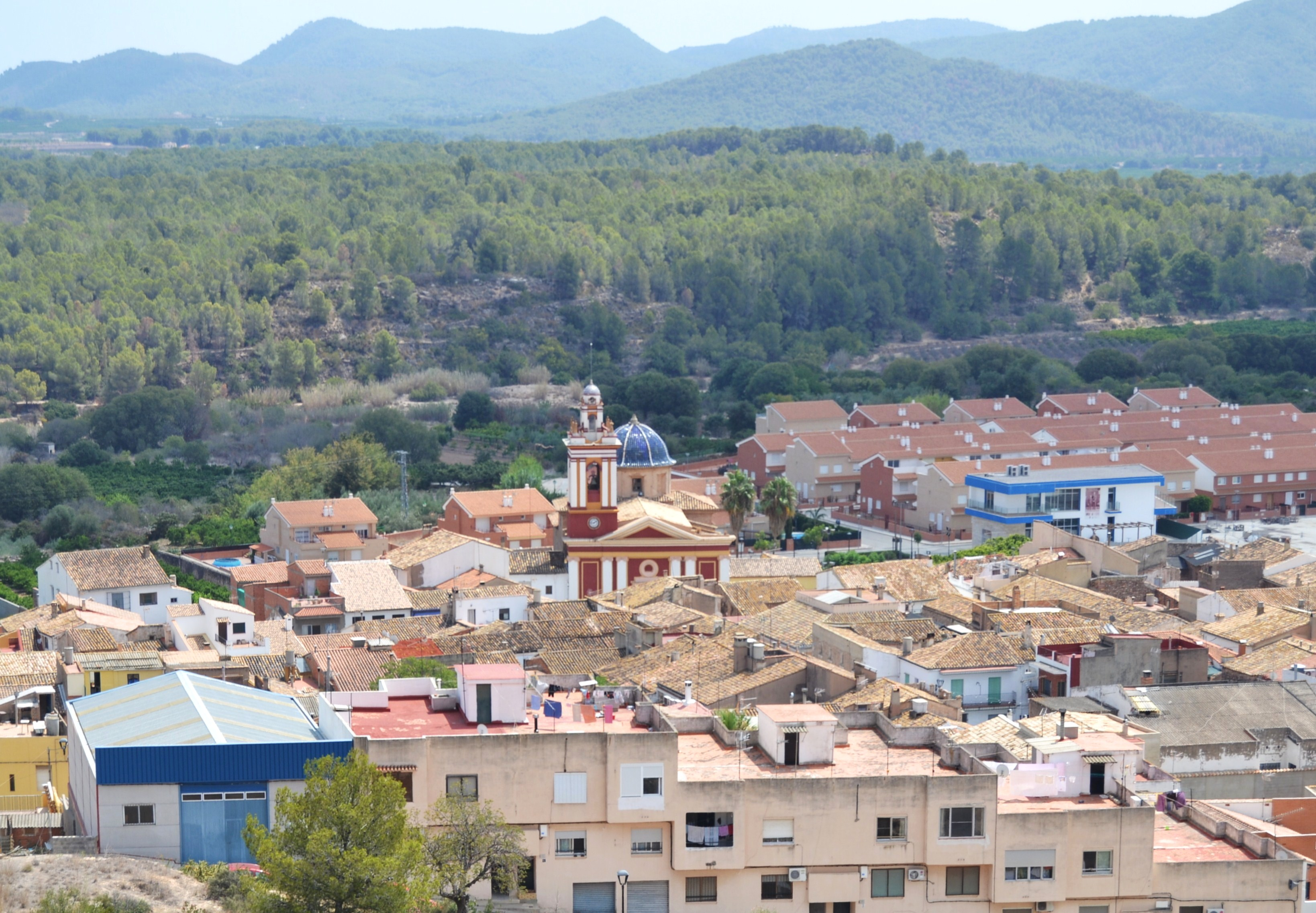

- Flag Coat of arms

- Location in Spain
- Coordinates: 39°45′32″N 0°21′10″W
- Country: Spain
- Autonomous community: Valencian Community
- Province: Valencia
- Comarca: Camp de Morvedre
- Judicial district: Sagunto

Government
  - Alcalde: José E. Terrádez Navarro

Area
  - Total: 11.71 km^{2} (4.52 sq mi)
- Elevation: 70 m (230 ft)

Population (2025-01-01)
  - Total: 624
  - Density: 53.3/km^{2} (138/sq mi)
- Demonyms: Alfarenc, alfarenca
- Time zone: UTC+1 (CET)
  - Summer (DST): UTC+2 (CEST)
- Postal code: 46594
- Official language(s): Valencian
- Website: Official website

Alfara de la Baronia (previously Alfara d'Algímia) is a municipality in the comarca of Camp de Morvedre in the Valencian Community, Spain.

== See also ==
- List of municipalities in Valencia
