= Quart de les Valls =

- Municipality
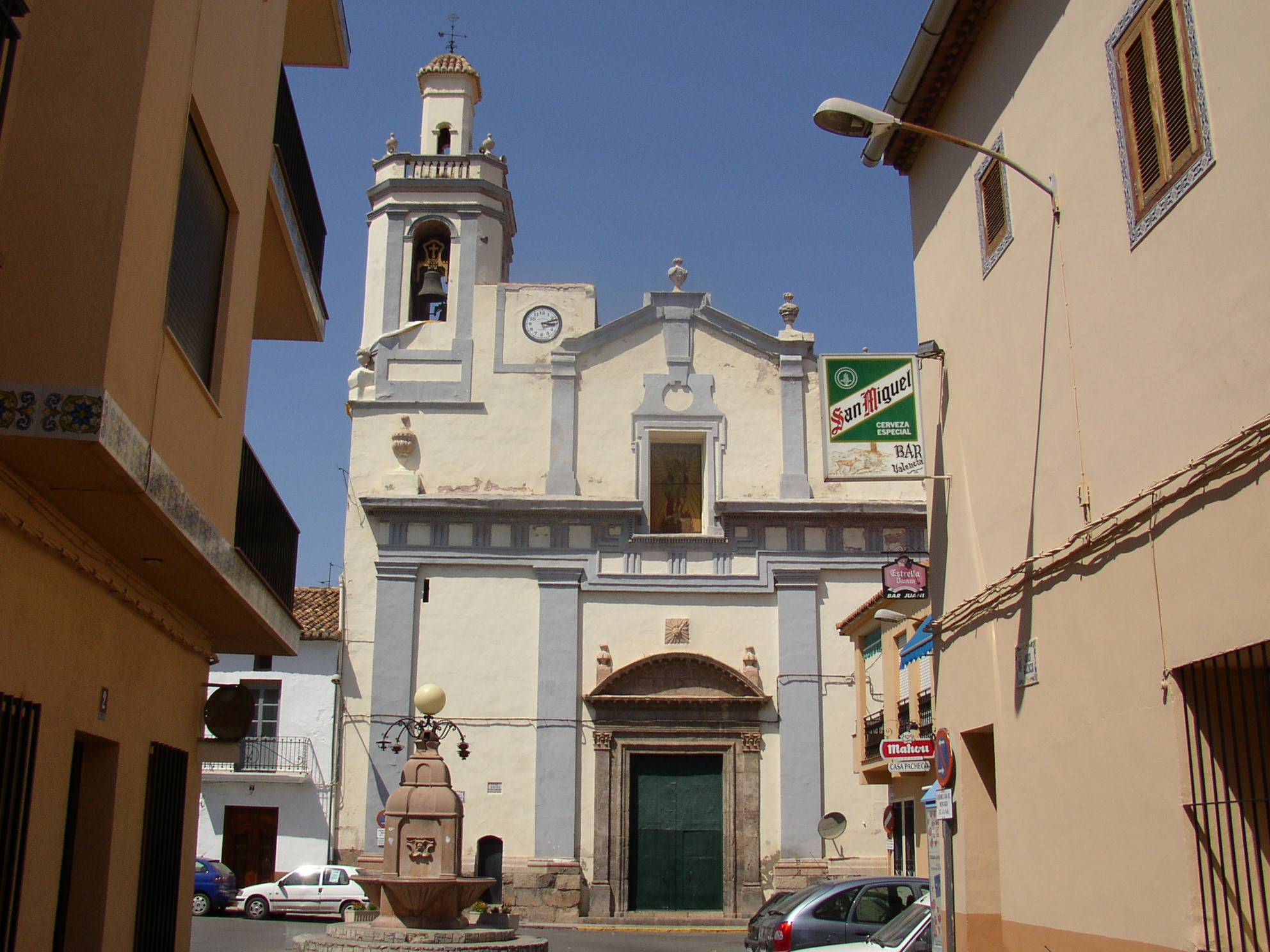

- Flag Coat of arms

- Location in Spain
- Coordinates: 39°44′28″N 0°16′17″W
- Country: Spain
- Autonomous community: Valencian Community
- Province: Valencia
- Comarca: Camp de Morvedre
- Judicial district: Sagunto

Government
  - Alcalde: José Sevilla Los Santos

Area
  - Total: 8.4 km^{2} (3.2 sq mi)
- Elevation: 29 m (95 ft)

Population (2025-01-01)
  - Total: 1,029
  - Density: 120/km^{2} (320/sq mi)
- Demonym(s): Quarter, quartera
- Time zone: UTC+1 (CET)
  - Summer (DST): UTC+2 (CEST)
- Postal code: 46510
- Official language(s): Valencian
- Website: Official website

Quart de les Valls is a municipality in the comarca of Camp de Morvedre in the Valencian Community, Spain.

== See also ==
- List of municipalities in Valencia
