= Camp de Morvedre =

Camp de Morvedre Campo de Murviedro
- Comarca
- Country: Spain
- Autonomous community: Valencian Community
- Province: València / Valencia
- Capital and largest city: Sagunto
- Municipalities: 16 municipalities: Albalat dels Tarongers, Alfara de Algimia, Algar de Palancia, Algímia d'Alfara, Benavites, Benifairó de les Valls, Canet d'en Berenguer, Estivella, Faura, Gilet, Petrés, Quart de les Valls, Quartell, Sagunto, Segart, Torres Torres

Area
  - Total: 271.11 km^{2} (104.68 sq mi)

Population (2023)
  - Total: 99,848
  - Density: 368.29/km^{2} (953.88/sq mi)
- Time zone: UTC+1 (CET)
  - Summer (DST): UTC+2 (CEST)

Camp de Morvedre (Valencian: [ˈkamb de moɾˈveðɾe]; Spanish: Campo de Murviedro [ˈkampo ðe muɾˈβjeðɾo]) is a comarca in the province of Valencia, Valencian Community, Spain.

== Municipalities ==
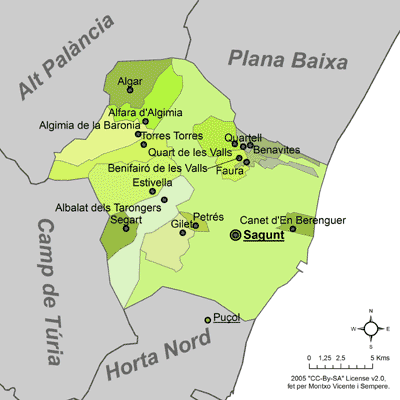
Municipalities of Camp de Morvedre

The municipalities in the comarca are:

- Albalat dels Tarongers
- Alfara de la Baronia
- Algar de Palancia
- Algímia d'Alfara
- Benavites
- Benifairó de les Valls
- Canet d'en Berenguer
- Estivella
- Faura
- Gilet
- Petrés
- Quart de les Valls
- Quartell
- Sagunto
- Segart
- Torres Torres
