= Canet d'en Berenguer =

- Municipality
- Coat of arms

- Location in Spain
- Coordinates: 39°40′46″N 0°13′14″W
- Country: Spain
- Autonomous community: Valencian Community
- Province: Valencia
- Comarca: Camp de Morvedre
- Judicial district: Sagunt

Government
  - Alcalde: Leandro Benito Antoni (PP)

Area
  - Total: 3.8 km^{2} (1.5 sq mi)
- Elevation: 8 m (26 ft)

Population (2025-01-01)
  - Total: 8,297
  - Density: 2,200/km^{2} (5,700/sq mi)
- Demonym(s): Caneter, canetera
- Time zone: UTC+1 (CET)
  - Summer (DST): UTC+2 (CEST)
- Postal code: 46529
- Official language(s): Valencian
- Website: Official website

Canet d'en Berenguer (Valencian pronunciation: [kaˈned dem beɾeŋˈɡeɾ], Spanish: Canet de Berenguer) is a municipality in the comarca of Camp de Morvedre in the Valencian Community, Spain.

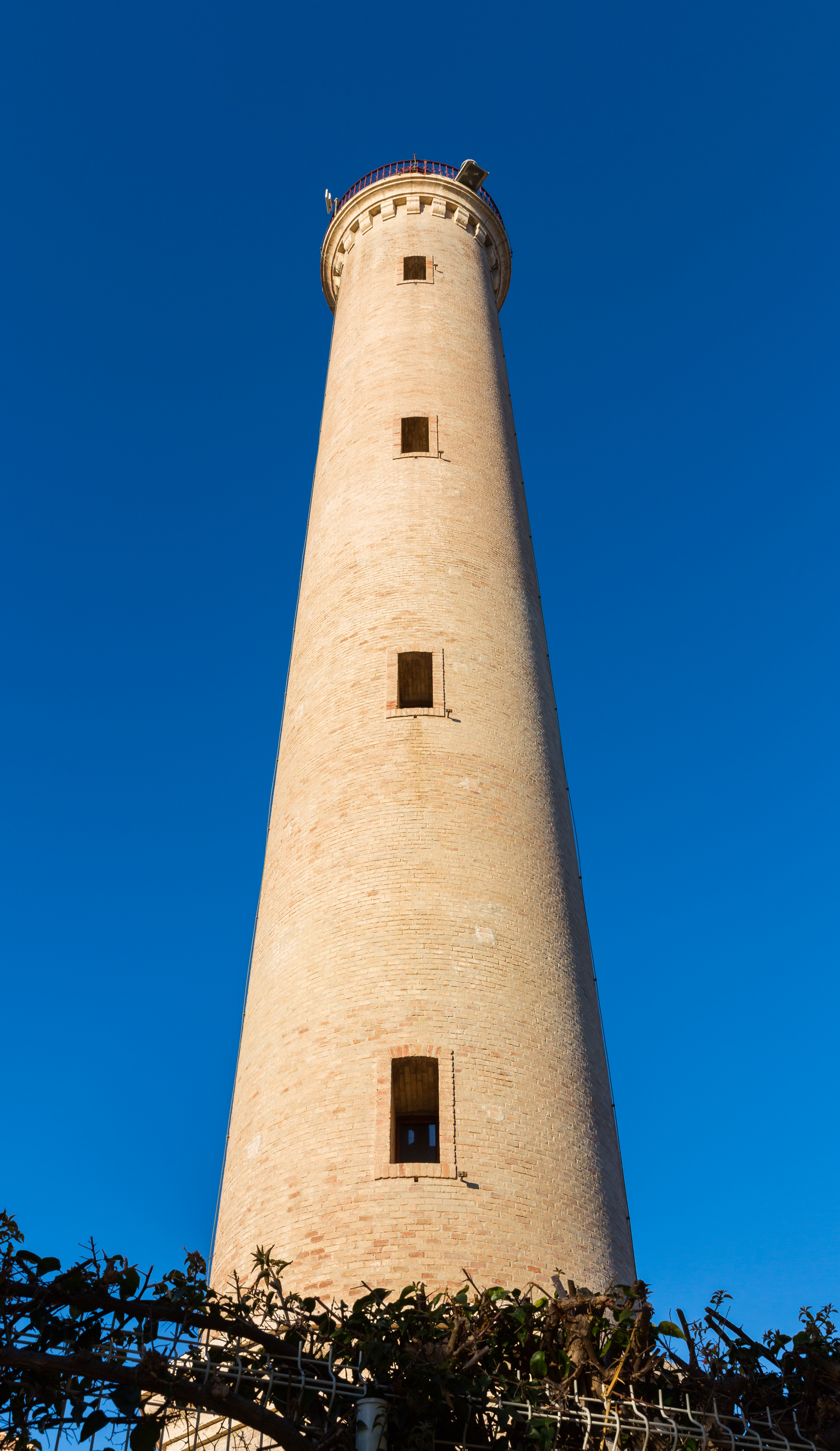
Lighthouse of Canet de Berenguer.

== Etymology ==
Canet comes from Latin canetum ("reed bed"), referring to the surrounding swampy area with extensive reed beds which stretched from Puzol to Almenara. The Berenguer part is named after the lord Francisco Berenguer who owned the territory during feudalism in the 16th century.

Formerly, it was also known as Canet de Murviedro.

== Geography ==
Canet d'en Berenguer is situated on the Mediterranean coast next to the mouth of the Palancia river. The river runs along its entire southern border.

It has a Mediterranean climate; winds come primarily from the east and the northeast.

== See also ==
- List of municipalities in Valencia
