= Sagunto =

Sagunto Sagunt
- City and municipality
- Sagunt / Sagunto (official)
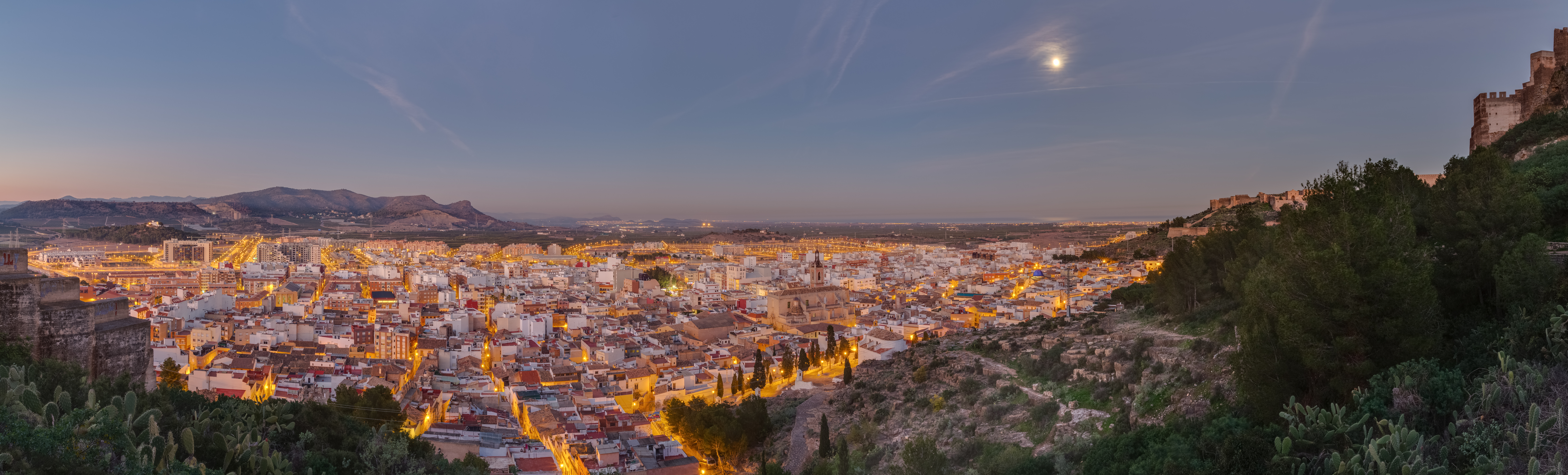

- Flag Coat of arms
- Interactive map of Sagunto
- Location in Spain Sagunto (Valencian Community) Sagunto (Spain)
- Coordinates: 39°40′48″N 0°16′42″W
- Country: Spain
- Autonomous community: Valencian Community
- Province: Valencia
- Comarca: Camp de Morvedre
- Founded: Before 219 BC

Government
  - Type: Mayor-council government
  - Body: Ajuntament de Sagunt
  - Alcalde (Mayor): Darío Moreno Lerga (2019-) (PSPV-PSOE)

Area
  - Total: 132 km^{2} (51 sq mi)
- Elevation: 49 m (161 ft)

Population (2025-01-01)
  - Total: 73,031
  - Density: 532/km^{2} (1,380/sq mi)
- Demonyms: saguntí, -ina; also morvedrí, -ina (Val.) saguntino/a (Sp.)
- Official language(s): Valencian; Spanish
- Linguistic area: Valencian
- Website: Official website

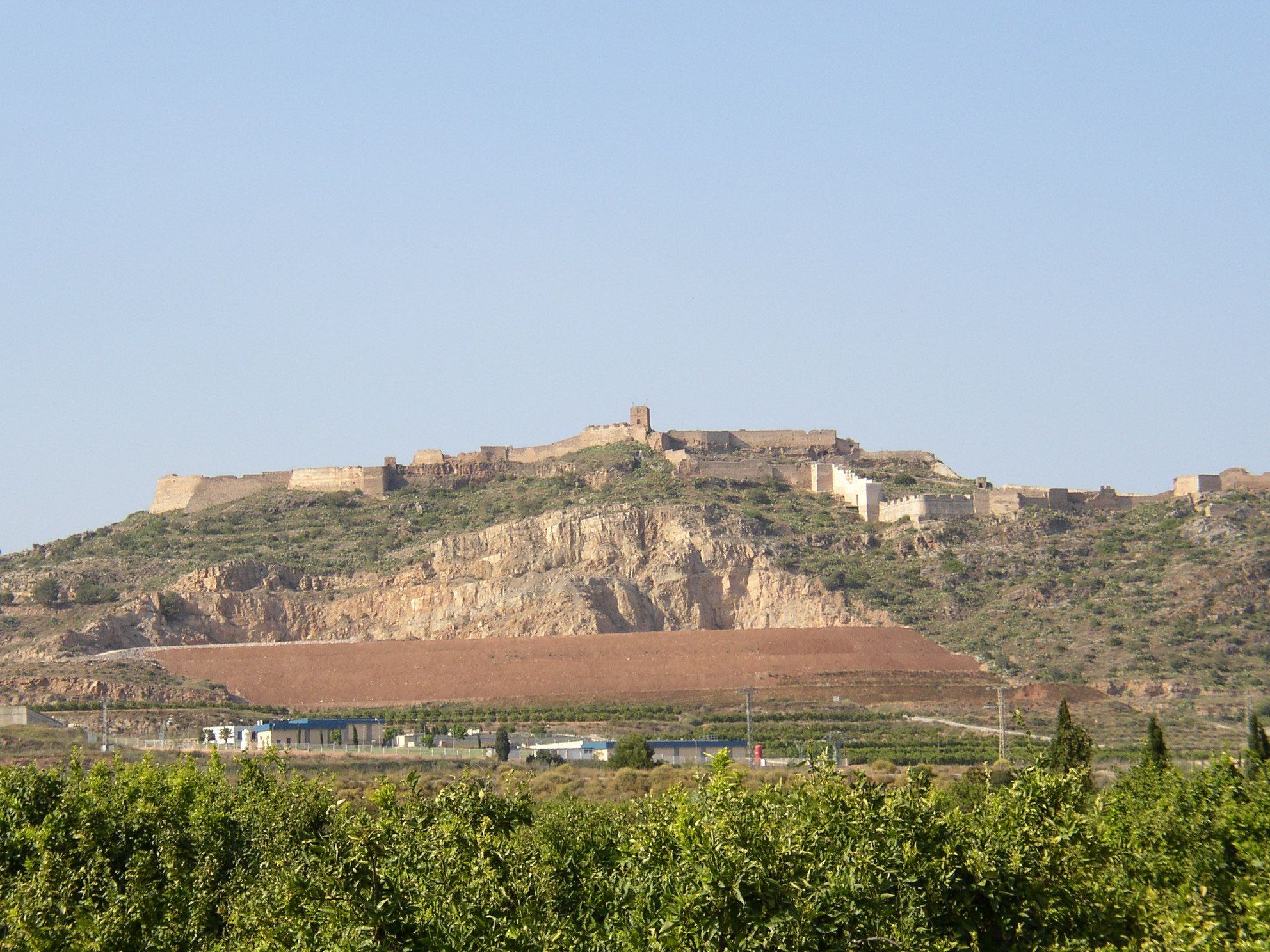
The Castle of Sagunto

Sagunto, (Note: Pronunciation of Sagunto: Spanish: [saˈɣunto]) in Spanish, or Sagunt, (Note: Pronunciation of Sagunt: Valencian: [saˈɣunt]) in Valencian (officially: Sagunt / Sagunto, historically: Morvedre (Note: Pronunciation of Morvedre: Valencian: [moɾˈveðɾe])), is a city and municipality of Spain, located in the province of Valencia, Valencian Community. It belongs to the modern fertile comarca of Camp de Morvedre. It is located approximately 30 km (19 mi) north of Valencia city center and lies on the Costa de Valencia on the Mediterranean Sea.

It is best known for the remains of the ancient Iberian and Roman city of Saguntum. The siege of Saguntum in 219 BC was the trigger of the Second Punic War between the Carthaginians and the Romans.

The municipality includes three differentiated urban nuclei: Ciutat Vella (Sagunt / Sagunto), Grau Vell and Puerto de Sagunto (Port de Sagunt). Over half of the population lives in the coastal settlement of Puerto de Sagunto.

== History ==
Gaspar Juan Escolano, in his Decades of the History of Valencia (1610–11), writes that the first settlers of Sagunto were Armenian families, the Sagas, who came to the peninsula with Tubal and laid the first foundations of the city. There is also speculation that Achaeans, probably from the Greek island of Zakynthos, could have founded Saguntum as one of the 5 colonies of the Greeks on the western coast of the Mediterranean Sea in the 5th century BC.

During the 5th c. BC the Iberians built a walled settlement on the hill overseeing the plain; a stretch of cyclopean limestone slabs from the former Temple of Diana survives, close to the modern church of Santa Maria. The city traded with coastal colonies in the western Mediterranean such as Carthage and, under their influence, minted its own coins. During this period, the city was known as Arse (Iberian: Arsesken)

By 219 BC, Saguntum was a large and commercially prosperous town, which sided with the local colonists and Rome against Carthage, and drew Hannibal's first assault, his siege of Saguntum, which triggered the Second Punic War, one of the most important wars of antiquity. After stiff resistance over the course of eight months Saguntum was captured by Hannibal.

Seven years later, the town was retaken by the Romans. In 214 BC, it became a municipium, was rebuilt and flourished. Hispania was not easily pacified and Romanized, as the Iberian career of Quintus Sertorius makes clear. Saguntum minted coins under his protection, and continued to house a mint in later Roman times. The Romans built a great circus in the lower part of the city and a theatre seating 8,000 spectators. Texts found indicate that the city had an amphitheatre and had about 50,000 inhabitants. This prosperity lasted for most of the empire, and is attested by inscriptions and ruins (notably a theatre, demolished by Napoleon's marshal Louis Gabriel Suchet, who also destroyed the Roman tower of Hercules).

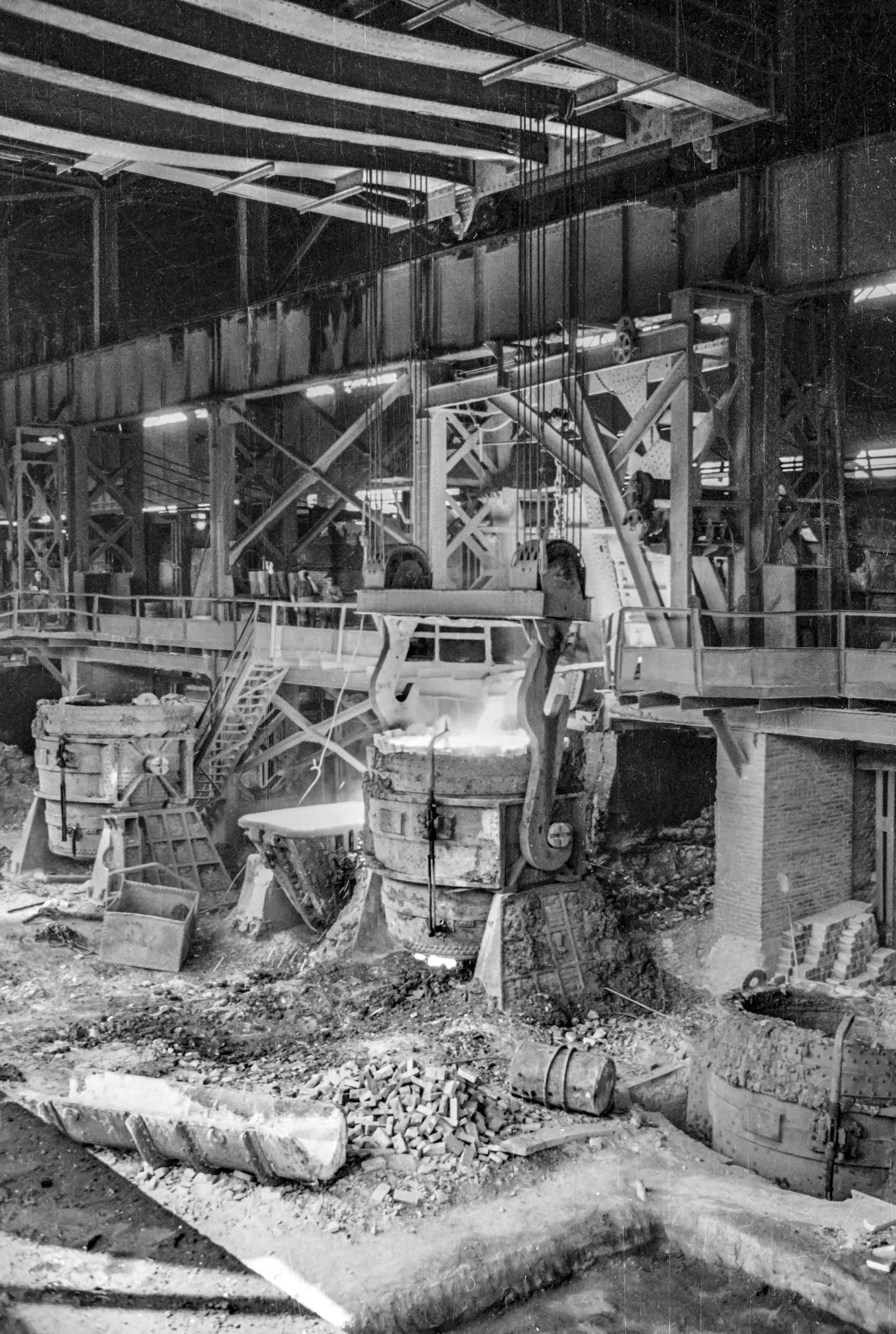
Sagunto kiln, 1951

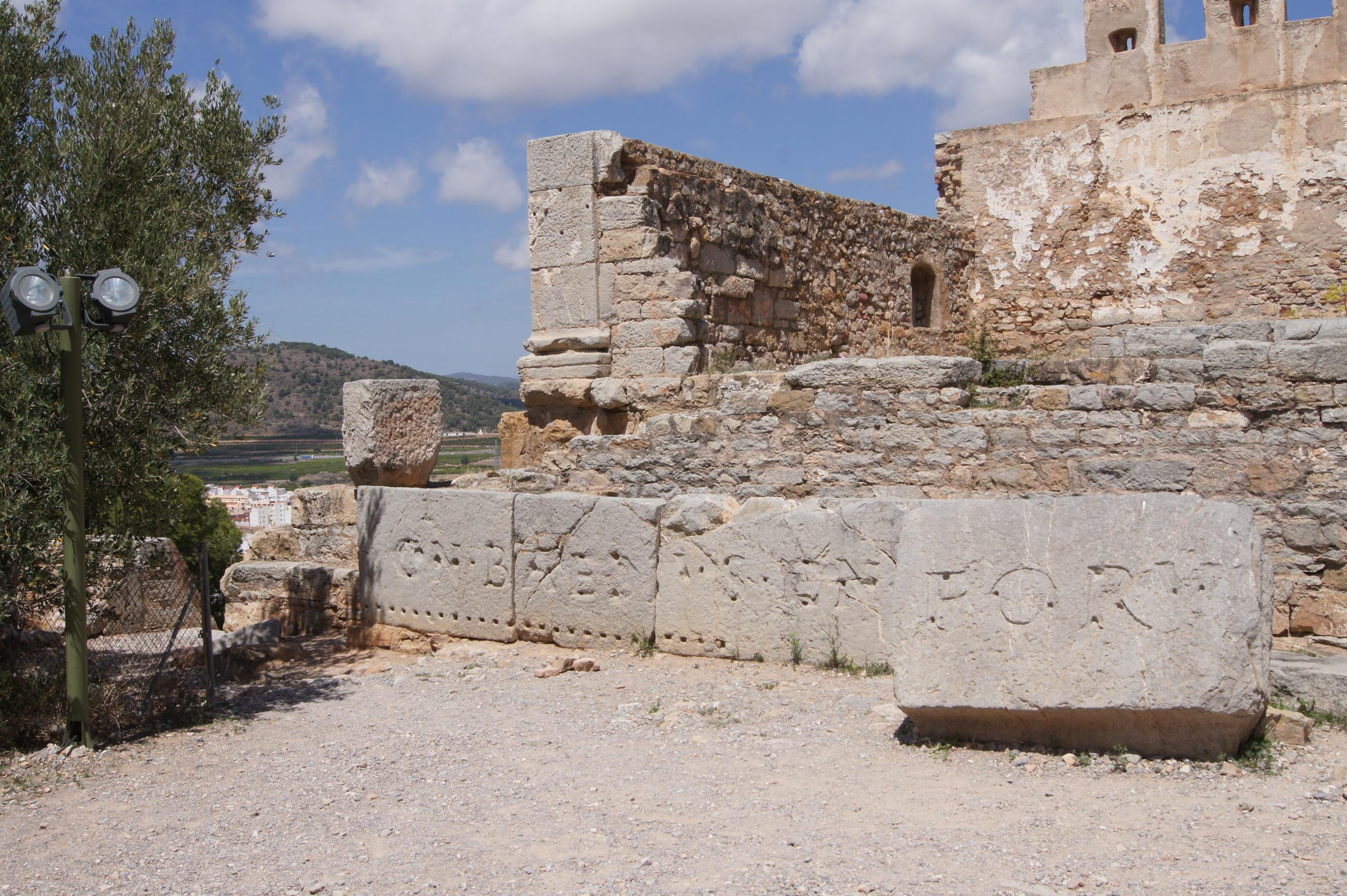
Saguntum Forum

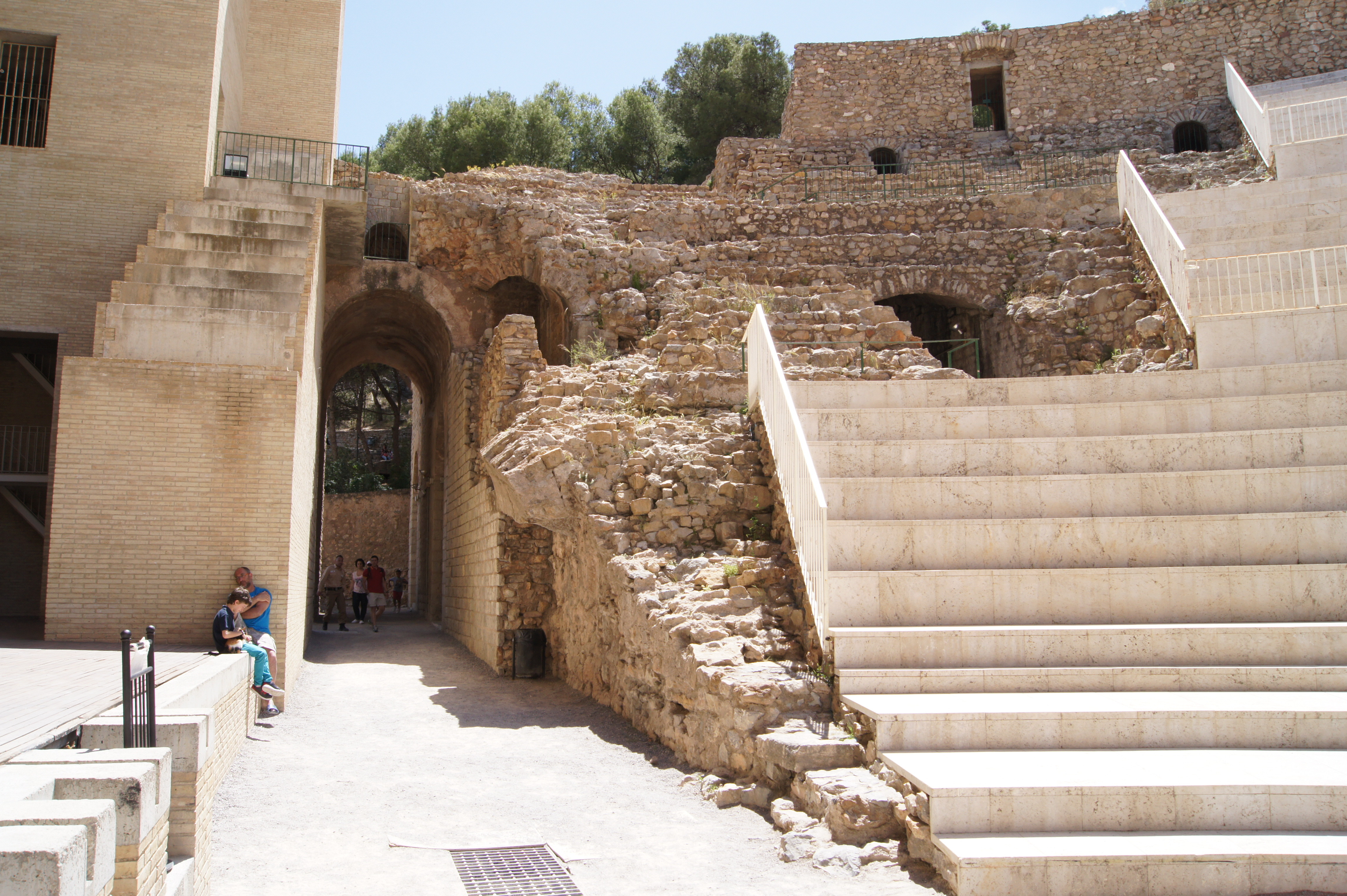
Saguntum Theatre

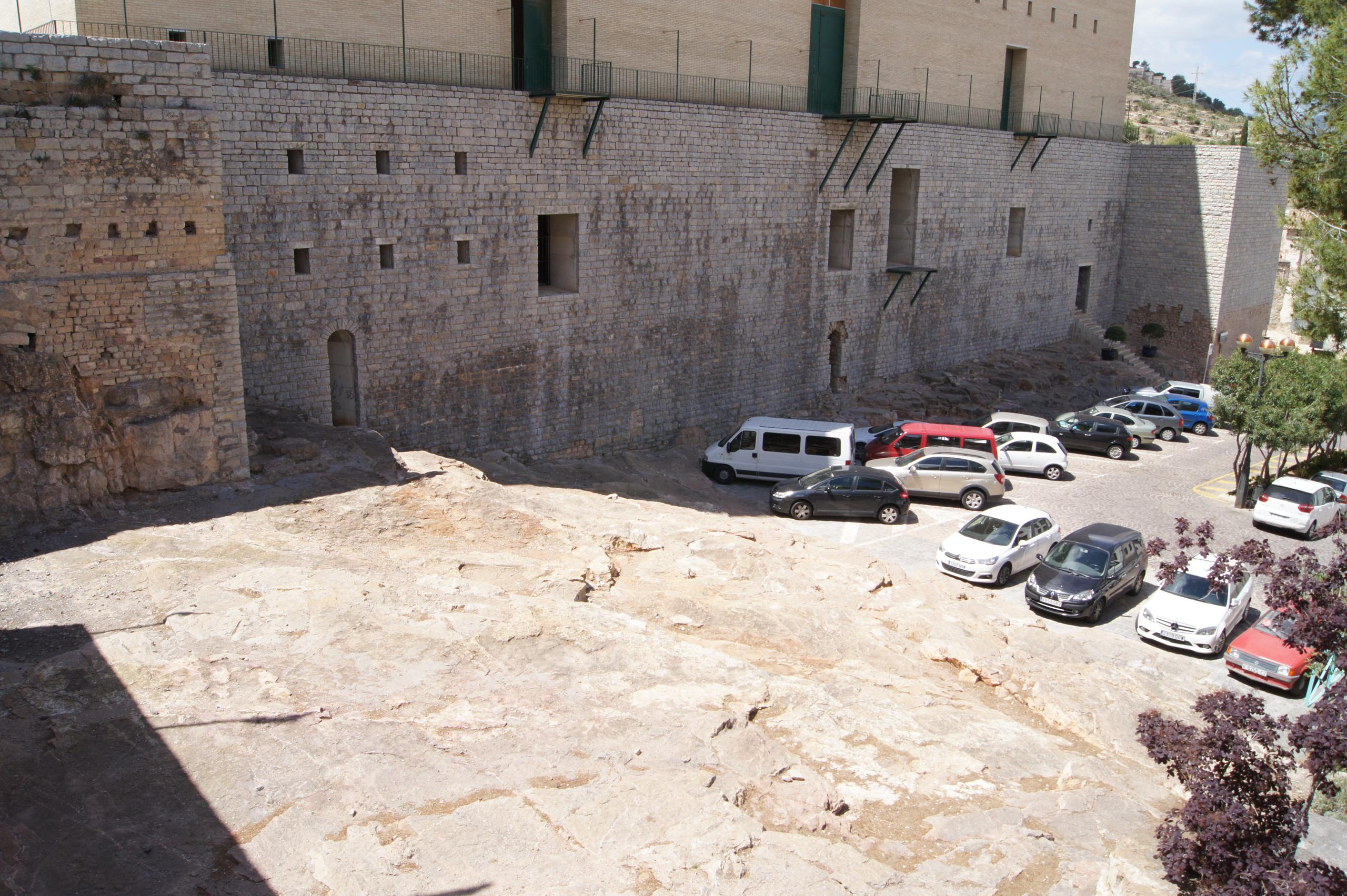
Saguntum rear wall of ancient theatre

Under the Arian Visigothic kings, Saguntum received its Catholic patron saint, a bishop named Sacerdos (whose name means "the priest"), who died peacefully of natural causes about AD 560.

In the early 8th century, the Muslim Arabs conquered Hispania and the city became part of the Caliphate of Cordoba and at that time the city reached an era of splendor, with baths, palaces, mosques and schools open for its cosmopolitan population. However, as Valencia grew, Saguntum declined. At that time, the town was known as Morvedre in Latin (Morviedro in Spanish), deriving from the expressio muri veteres, meaning "ancient walls". Morvedre was also the origin of the Arabic name of the city مُرْبَاطَرُ or مُرْبِيطَرُ (Morbāṭar or Morbīṭar).

In 1098, the city was conquered by El Cid but the Muslims recovered it shortly thereafter. The city had been under the Muslim Arab rule for over 500 years when James I of Aragon conquered it in 1238.

During the Peninsular War, a Spanish attempt to raise the French siege of the castle failed in the Battle of Saguntum on 25 October 1811. In the weeks before the battle, the Spanish garrison made a valiant and successful defense; but it surrendered the day after the battle. Historian Charles Oman stated that the site was converted into a fortress in 1810–1811 by General Joaquín Blake at the suggestion of British officer Charles William Doyle. At that time, much of the largely intact Roman theater was dismantled to provide stone for restoring the old walls.

Saguntum was badly damaged in warfare, but has retained many Valencian Gothic structures. In the late 19th century, a steel-making industry grew up that supported the modern city, which extends in the coastal plain below the citadel hill. The last steel oven closed in April 1984. It has been restored and is now a tourist attraction.

=== Jewish history ===
Sagunto was once home to a Jewish community. According to a Jewish legend, a tombstone was found in Sagunto with the inscription "Adoniram, treasurer of King Solomon, who came to collect the tax tribute and died." Jews were already living in the city during Muslim rule. After the Massacre of 1391, the Jewish community in Sagunto became the only surviving community in Valencia. During the 1492 expulsion of the Jews, there is documentation that 500 Jews left Sagunto to North Africa and other parts of Europe.

The Judería is one of the most well-preserved Jewish quarters in Spain. The entrance of the quarter is through an arch called "Portal de la juheria," which lies between Sang Vella Street and Castillo Street.

== Main sights ==
- The remains of Sagunto Castle may be seen on top of the hill. It preserves much of its walled ramparts, of Roman and Moorish origin.
- A Roman theater, partly restored in late 20th century. It is found on the northern slope of the citadel hill. It was the first official National Monument declared in Spain (1896).
- The Gothic Església de Santa Maria (St Mary's Church), in the Plaça Major (Main Square).
- The Palau Municipal (City Palace), or town hall; a beautiful 18th century building with a neoclassical façade.
- The early Gothic Església del Salvador (Church of Our Savior).
- The narrow streets of the Juderia (Old Jewish Quarter), on the hillside on the way up to the citadel.
- The 13th century Santa Ana convent adjacent to the Plaça de Pi.
- The Sagunto History Museum, located in the house of Mestre Peña, a building in the Jewish quarter dating from the fourteenth and fifteenth centuries. The largest collection is from the Ibero-Roman Period.

== Sport ==
CD Acero is the town's association football team. Its stadium is El Fornás, located in El Puerto de Sagunto.

== See also ==
- List of municipalities in Valencia

== Bibliography ==
- Bodí Ramiro, Julio (2015). De chatarra a patrimonio. El proceso de patrimonialización de las antiguas instalaciones metalúrgicas de Puerto de Sagunto (1984-2014) (PDF). Universitat de València.
- Ripollès i Alegre, P.P. (2002). Arse-Saguntum: historia monetaria de la ciudad y su territorio. Fundación Bancaja. ISBN 8484710270.
- Oman, Charles (1996) [1914]. A History of the Peninsular War Volume V. Vol. 5. Mechanicsburg, Pennsylvania: Stackpole. ISBN 1-85367-225-4.
