= Frank Scarabino =

New York City mobster

Frank "Franky the Beast" Scarabino (born 1956) is a New York City mobster and former soldier in the North Jersey-based DeCavalcante crime family,

== Background ==
Since the late 1970s, US law enforcement listed Scarabino as an associate of the crime family based in the Northern New Jersey area, and linked him with reputed 'made men' Anthony "Marshmallow" Mannarino and Anthony "Tony" Capo sometime in the mid-1980s, as well as recognizing him as a member of the DeCavalcante crime family, under reputed captains Philip Abramo and Anthony Rotondo.

== Murdering Fred Weiss ==
According to US law enforcement, in August, 1989, Scarabino was involved in a conspiracy along with soldiers Anthony Capo, James "Jimmy" Gallo, Vincent "Vinny Ocean" Palermo, captain Philip Abramo and even Stefano "Steve the Truck Driver" Vitabile, the reputed family consigliere, which involved murdering Fred Weiss, a private sanitation magnate considered for becoming an informant. The hit was requested by reputed Gambino crime family boss John Gotti of New York, and Giovanni "John the Eagle" Riggi, boss of the DeCavalcante family, accepted his request, and contracted Scarabino, Capo, Gallo and Palermo for the task. Scarabino, still only a family associate, reportedly agreed and on September 11, 1989, Scarabino and others shot and killed Weiss in front of his Staten Island home; however, it is Palermo, Capo and Gallo who are mostly credited for Weiss's murder.

== Criminal Activities ==
During the 1990s era, Scarabino is to have been inducted into the DeCavalcante crime family, under reputed captains Anthony Rotondo of Elizabeth, New Jersey and Philip Abramo of the New York faction in New York City. At the time, Scarabino's criminal activities were labor and construction racketeering, illegal gambling, loansharking, extortion and murder, as he reportedly conspired to murder Daniel Annunziatta and even former acting boss and captain, Gaetano "Corky" Vastola, in the early 1990s on the orders of John D'Amato, who had been recruited by John Gotti into take over the DeCavalcante crime family after the imprisonment of Riggi in 1990. According to US law enforcement, Scarabino also helped organize the murder of former family underboss, Louis "Fat Lou" LaRasso in 1991, in aid of the racketeering operations that Philip Abramo took over in New York. It was around this time that Scarabino bought his residence in Staten Island, New York.

== Indictment & Witness Protection ==
On October 19, 2000, a pile of federal indictments were launched at over 50 members of the DeCavalcante crime family, with predicates in violation of the Racketeer Influenced and Corrupt Organizations Act (RICO statutes), as Scarabino was charged with extortion, illegal gambling, conspiracy to commit bookmaking and loansharking activities. He was also charged with the murder of Fred Weiss, as well as conspiracy to the attempted murders of Daniel Annunziatta, Gaetano "Corky" Vastola and Louis "Fat Lou" LaRasso. Four days prior to his arrest, Scarabino was ordered to kill the wives and children of Anthony Capo (a known cooperator) and Anthony Rotondo (a suspected cooperator). This order so disturbed and repulsed Scarabino he chose to become an informant and testify against his former associates of the DeCavalcante family.

As of 2008, Frank Scarabino is presumably participating in the Witness Protection Program.
