= Louis LaRasso =

American mobster (1926–1991)

- Born: Luciano LaRasso; July 15, 1926; Newark, New Jersey, U.S.
- Died: November 11, 1991 (aged 65); Elizabeth, New Jersey, U.S.
- Cause of death: Multiple gunshot wounds
- Other names: "Fat Lou"; "Fat Louie"
- Occupation: Mobster
- Allegiance: DeCavalcante crime family

Louis "Fat Lou" LaRasso (July 15, 1926 – November 11, 1991) was an American mobster and the longtime official underboss of the DeCavalcante crime family.

== Apalachin meeting ==
After being promoted to capo by former boss Filippo "Phil" Amari, LaRasso and reputed underboss Frank Majuri attended the infamous 1957 Apalachin Meeting, as the only ones representing the newly made New Jersey family. Amari himself did not attend, as he reportedly retired due to family rivalry later that year, and was replaced by Nicholas "Nick" Delmore. This saw to it that Majuri was demoted to captain, as well as LaRasso was promoted underboss of the North Jersey rackets.

== Sam the Plumber ==
After Delmore's health turned ill and later died in 1964, he appointed his nephew Simone "Sam the Plumber" DeCavalcante to new boss of his family. DeCavalcante doubled the family's income and membership, and promoted back Majuri as the family consigliere, as well as keeping LaRasso as the reputed underboss. After Sam DeCavalcante and LaRasso were sent to prison due to federal authorities monitoring conversations between DeCavalcante and LaRasso discussing illegal gambling operations worth more than $20 million a year, Giovanni "John the Eagle" Riggi, LaRasso's rival, stepped up as acting boss while DeCavalcante and LaRasso were imprisoned for 5 years. He was a prominent member of Building Laborer's Union Local 394 of Elizabeth, New Jersey.

== A favor for Carlo Gambino ==
The Brooklyn-based head of the Gambino crime family, Carlo Gambino, asked the DeCavalcante crime family for a favor. The favor was to kill Joseph "Joey Surprise" Feola, an associate in the garbage business deemed suddenly unreliable. According to Jerry Capeci, underboss LaRasso lured Feola to a garage, where, according to whispered words picked up on the bug, Feola was strangled, wrapped in a burlap bag and buried. LaRasso later confirmed the hit to Gambino captain James "Jimmy Brown" Failla.

== Release from prison ==
After returning to the DeCavalcante crime family in the early 1970s, LaRasso's position gradually declined as DeCavalcante retired from the New Jersey rackets and moved to Florida, handing the leadership over to Giovanni Riggi. Riggi promoted Girolamo "Jimmy" Palermo as new acting underboss of the family in the late 1970s, leaving LaRasso's position becoming only official.

== Demoted by John Riggi ==
During the 1980s, Riggi continued to run the large labor and construction racketeering operations in North Jersey with help from various capos Giacomo "Jake" Amari and Giuseppe "Pino" Schifilliti. As LaRasso's friend Frank Majuri died and the position of consigliere went to Stefano "Steve the Truck Driver" Vitabile, LaRasso was demoted in the late 1980s to soldier, as Riggi was put on trial for extortion and racketeering charges along with Palermo, leaving Giacomo "Jake" Amari as the new acting underboss.

== Death ==
After Riggi was sentenced to 15 years in prison in 1990, John "Johnny Boy" D'Amato took over as acting boss with Giacomo Amari as acting underboss and Stefano "Steve the Truck Driver" Vitabile still as consigliere. It was around this time that LaRasso, after a fallout with D'Amato, was reported missing in the summer of 1991 after he failed to show up for his 65th birthday. Reportedly, D'Amato feared LaRasso as a rival and thought he'd turn captain Charles "Big Ears" Majuri, son of Frank Majuri, to follow him in an attempt to take over the DeCavalcante crime family. His body has never been found, however, his killer Vincent "Vinny Ocean" Palermo later turned state's evidence and confessed to the crime. Palermo also became the later acting boss and testified against dozens of New Jersey mobsters.

== The aftermath ==
In 2006, More than a decade later, administration member and consigliere Stefano Vitabile as well as capos Giuseppe "Pino" Schifilliti and Philip "Phil" Abramo were tried and convicted of LaRasso's murder, as well as two others. In addition to extortion and racketeering charges, these high-ranking mobsters were sentenced to life imprisonment. LaRasso's shooters were reportedly Anthony "Tony" Capo, Louis "Louie Eggs" Consalvo and Gregory Rago, who, except for Capo, were sent to prison.
