= Frank Polizzi =

American mobster

Francesco "Frank" Polizzi
- Born: July 11, 1936; San Giuseppe Jato, Sicily, Italy
- Died: December 24, 2001 (aged 65); Newark, New Jersey, U.S.
- Other name: "Frankie Hotel"
- Occupation: Mobster
- Allegiance: DeCavalcante crime family
- Conviction: Drug trafficking (1987)
- Penalty: 20 years' imprisonment

Francesco "Frank" Polizzi (July 11, 1936 – December 24, 2001) was a New Jersey mobster and caporegime in the DeCavalcante crime family.

== DeCavalcante family ==
A reputed drug dealer in the Northern New Jersey area, US law enforcement reportedly associated Polizzi with the DeCavalcante crime family in the late 1950s, and later ranked him as a soldier for reputed Boss Nicholas "Nick" Delmore, in Sam DeCavalcante's crew. Involved in loansharking, extortion, illegal gambling and especially narcotics activities, Polizzi continued to operate in the Newark faction of the family throughout the 1960s, but as Sam DeCavalcante took over the family in 1965, Polizzi was passed over of being promoted, as Giovanni "John the Eagle" Riggi was made captain of DeCavalcante's crew. Later, DeCavalcante was indicted with over 50 of his associates, including Polizzi, and sentenced to five years in prison, however, with his release in the early 1970s, Riggi had taken over the family and DeCavalcante himself had relocated to Florida. Polizzi continued to operate only as a soldier.

== Promoted ==
As Giovanni Riggi kept running the DeCavalcante family in the late 1970s, Polizzi was involved in large heroin and cocaine distribution and transportation operations. He continued to operate out of Newark, New Jersey with other members of the DeCavalcante crime family, in this case, Joseph Ganci. But in the early 1980s, as Riggi officially took over all of North Jersey, Polizzi was finally promoted to a respective captain in the Newark, New Jersey faction of the DeCavalcante crime family, and heavily involved in loansharking, extortion, illegal gambling and narcotics operations, which he oversaw from a pizza parlor, owned by his associate, Ganci.

== Pizza Connection Trial ==
In early 1985, Polizzi was picked up by US law enforcement and put on trial for major involvement in heroin and cocaine operations. A main defendant in the infamous Pizza Connection Trial, Polizzi was charged with distribution and transportation of narcotics, in which Mafia bosses of both New York City and Sicily had cooperated in and brought drugs worth an amount of $1.6 billion into the United States between 1975 and 1984. According to Jerry Capeci; Polizzi's wife was on the witness stand trying to back her husband's claim that the bag the FBI saw him pick up from a cohort in June, 1983 contained fresh sardines, not money or heroin. Holding a bag she prepared at home that morning as a prop, Cecelia Polizzi testified that her husband had brought the fish home so she could fix a Sicilian specialty dish, pasta al sarde. The entire jury started laughing, saying it was hilarious. Polizzi was sentenced to 20 years for dealing drugs on March 2, 1987, along with all of his 21 co-defendants.

== Prison ==
Sentenced to 20 years behind bars, Polizzi developed lung cancer in the early 1990s, and had it confirmed by doctors and was then transferred to the prison hospital. According to Jerry Capeci, the medical care didn't help, and gave him only six months left to live, in which the judge agreed to reduce Polizzi's sentence. After spending a total of eight years in prison on narcotics charges, Polizzi was released from federal prison on April 3, 1995 . However, he went right back to the DeCavalcante crime family.

== Caporegime ==
After returning to Newark and his crew in the DeCavalcante family, Polizzi was let into the inner circle of the new regime. Giovanni Riggi had been imprisoned on extortion and racketeering charges in 1990 and sentenced to 15 years in prison, as well as several of their leaders had been murdered and disappeared, however, Polizzi continued to operate with prominent capos Giuseppe "Pino" Schifilliti and Vincent "Vinny Ocean" Palermo, including the current Acting boss Giacomo "Jake" Amari, but as he died of stomach cancer in 1997, everything changed.

== The power vacuum ==
After Amari's death in 1997, a huge power vacuum was left with the DeCavalcante family, including both Elizabeth faction leaders Vincent Palermo and Girolamo "Jimmy" Palermo (no relation) and Newark faction leaders Polizzi and Charles "Big Ears" Majuri all attempting to restructure the family of North Jersey. However, using Stefano "Steve the Truck Driver" Vitabile, the family Consigliere, Riggi constructed the "Ruling Panel", consisting of both the Palermos with Majuri representing the Newark faction. This "Ruling Committee" continued to run the day-to-day activities of the family, although after Majuri became dissatisfied with the current leadership and put out a contract on Vincent Palermo's life, which failed to succeed, including Palermo organizing Majuri's murder, which also failed, Majuri and Polizzi of the Newark faction were cast out from the rest of the family of Elizabeth, where all the power was. However, Polizzi had great friendship with both Palermo and Vitabile, which made him trusted by the new family regime. In fact, he was so trusted that Polizzi was in on six assassination plots, all hatched by Palermo and Vitabile, although many didn't succeed.

== Indictments ==
But as the DeCavalcante crime family finally had been slowing down the war of New Jersey, US law enforcement launched a massive attack with indictments on 40 members of the family, including Polizzi, on December 2, 1999. Every family captain was arrested and put on trial for labor and construction racketeering, drug trafficking, illegal gambling, extortion, loansharking, money laundering, fraud and murder and conspiracy charges, which led to three highly involved members turning informants, first soldier Anthony Capo, then captain Anthony Rotondo, and in the end, acting boss Vincent Palermo also agreed to turn state's evidence. Polizzi and the rest of the DeCavalcante family regime were put on trial for another more charges and placed in custody.

== Death ==
However, as the US authorities had put 40 members, almost the entire DeCavalcante crime family, on trial in 2000, it took long time before the trials were even halfway completed. Polizzi by now was critically ill with cancer, and was frequently in the Medical Center for prisoners, and on Christmas Eve, 2001, seven years after his diagnosis, Polizzi died.
