= Louis Consalvo =

American mobster

- Born: July 3, 1958 (age 68); Old Bridge Township, New Jersey, U.S.
- Other name: "Louie Eggs"
- Occupation: Mobster
- Allegiance: DeCavalcante crime family
- Convictions: Racketeering, murder, loan sharking, bookmaking, and conspiracy to commit securities fraud (2002)
- Penalty: 20 to 25 years' imprisonment

Louis "Louie Eggs" Consalvo (born July 3, 1958) is a New Jersey mobster and reputed soldier and acting caporegime in the DeCavalcante crime family. A lifelong resident of Old Bridge Township, New Jersey, Consalvo reportedly joined the North Jersey-based DeCavalcante crime family during the disappearance in November 1991 of underboss Louis "Fat Lou" LaRasso. Consalvo, Gregory Rago, and Anthony Capo allegedly murdered LaRasso in return for becoming made men, or full members, of the family. Consalvo is a nephew of Carmine and Francis Consalvo who are in-laws to Bonanno crime family capo Frank Lino. He is also the brother-in-law of DeCavalcante crime family capo Philip C. Abramo. Louis holds a Financial Industry Regulatory Authority brokerage license. In the mid-1990s, Consalvo and Rago began working in a social club on Mott Street in New York, as well as operating various criminal activities on Manhattan, which eventually led to a dispute between the New Jersey and the New York families. At a sit-down in New York, reputed DeCavalcante crime family acting boss, Giacomo "Jake" Amari and Consigliere Stefano "Steve the Truck Driver" Vitabile represented the family, along with Gambino crime family captain/street boss Nicholas "Little Nick" Corozzo and Colombo crime family acting consigliere Vincenzo "Vinny" Aloi, where the representatives of New York argued that Consalvo's operations should've gone to one of the Five Families, as those criminal operations were in New York City, and not New Jersey. The conflict was eventually resolved peacefully when it was ruled that the DeCavalcante crime family could no longer 'make' members outside of New Jersey and South Philadelphia, which was another area that the DeCavalcantes had traditionally recruited from.

== Prison ==
Consalvo and Rago began operating in New Jersey, and held their criminal interests in labor racketeering, loansharking, illegal gambling and extortion activities. In 1997, Amari died and a panel was installed to run the day-to-day operations the members of this panel included Vincent "Vinny Ocean" Palermo, Charles "Big Ears" Majuri and Girolamo "Jimmy" Palermo. After the panel was installed a brief skirmish insured as Majuri was not pleased, feeling that he should have been made the acting boss due to his service to the family. Palermo recruited members of the DeCavalcante family to do the hit but they got nervous and backed off. After Palermo decided Majuri wasn't a threat, but seized control of the day-to-day operations in effect becoming de facto boss.

On October 19, 2000, 50 DeCavalacante family members were indicted on federal racketeering charges. Consalvo was charged with participation in the 1991 LaRasso homicide, loansharking, the operation of an illegal bookmaking business and a conspiracy to commit securities fraud. Consalvo accepted a plea agreement from the government and in 2002 was sentenced to 20 to 25 years in prison.

Consalvo was imprisoned at the Federal Correctional Institution (FCI) in Elkton, Ohio. He was released from prison on February 14, 2012.

In 2013 he was made acting captain of his brother-in-law Philip Abramo's crew.
