= Francesco Guarraci =

American mobster

- Born: August 7, 1955; Ribera, Sicily, Italy
- Died: April 14, 2016 (aged 60); Elizabeth, New Jersey, U.S.
- Other name: "Frank"
- Occupation: Crime boss
- Allegiance: DeCavalcante crime family

Francesco "Frank" Guarraci (August 7, 1955 – April 14, 2016) was an Italian-born American mobster. He was a prominent member and reputed acting boss of the DeCavalcante crime family.

== Early inducted member ==
Francesco Guarraci was born in Ribera, Sicily on August 7, 1955, to where the DeCavalcante crime family's origins can be traced. In 1967 he emigrated to the United States, and in 1989, Guarraci was inducted into the crime family during a ceremony led by John Riggi, according to Vincent "Vinny Ocean" Palermo, who turned state's evidence in 2000. He was a regular habituate of the Ribera Social Club in Elizabeth, New Jersey. However, Guarraci wasn't recognized as an inducted member by US law enforcement until years later. In 2010, he was indicted for attempted extortion of Lenny's Brick Oven Pizza in Washington Township, New Jersey.

== DeCavalcante captain ==
Guarraci was listed as a soldier for the DeCavalcante crime family throughout the late 1990s and early 2000s, as the family was broken down by federal law enforcement and internal rivalry, as well as the longtime acting boss, Vincent Palermo who turned state's evidence in 2000. At some point between 2005 and 2006, Guarraci was promoted in the family, as he was listed as a caporegime by New Jersey law enforcement in the beginning of 2006. Guarraci's official job is as a foreman in Laborers' Local 394.

== Riggi's acting boss ==
In early 2007, it was confirmed that after the convictions of consigliere Stefano "Steve the Truck Driver" Vitabile and Girolamo "Jimmy" Palermo from 2003 to 2006, Guarraci was promoted to "acting boss" along with underboss, Joseph "Joe" Miranda, to run the day-to-day activities of the DeCavalcante crime family. As of May, 2009, Francesco Guarraci at age 54 was still in charge of the family, along with Miranda, on the orders of the imprisoned boss Giovanni "John the Eagle" Riggi. The Ribera Social Club, where family members hang out, had been run by Guarraci since 1989. The prospects for a strong organization existed due to the induction of 12 new members by Joseph Miranda. As Guarraci continued to consolidate his power in the area the hopes for a return to the days of much higher mob power increased. On April 14, 2016, Guarraci died of cancer in Elizabeth, New Jersey at the age of 60.
