= Joseph Miranda =

American mobster (1923–2014)

- Born: December 7, 1923; Lodi, New Jersey, U.S.
- Died: December 24, 2014 (aged 91); New Jersey, U.S.
- Other name: "The Old Man"
- Occupation: Mobster
- Allegiance: DeCavalcante crime family

Joseph Anthony Miranda (December 7, 1923 – December 24, 2014) was an American mobster and member of the New Jersey–based DeCavalcante crime family. A longtime "soldier" to Simone "Sam the Plumber" DeCavalcante and later boss Giovanni Riggi, he became acting underboss for Girolamo "Jimmy" Palermo following the imprisonment of many high-ranking members in 2003.

As the crime family's most senior member, earning him the moniker "the Old Man", Miranda was the de facto head of the DeCavalcantes for three years until stepping down in favor of Francesco Guarraci in late 2006.

== Biography ==
Joseph Miranda served in the armed forces during World War II. He was a made man and loan shark under both founder Simone "Sam the Plumber" DeCavalcante and Giovanni "John the Eagle" Riggi during the 1960s and mid-1970s. FBI documents indicate that DeCavalcante once prevented Miranda from being killed by speaking up for him at a sit-down meeting after Miranda robbed another mobster while working for DeCavalcante.

For decades, Miranda operated from a First Avenue bar in Elizabeth, New Jersey. He was recognized as the acting underboss for Girolamo "Jimmy" Palermo after Palermo's incarceration in 2003. According to law enforcement, Miranda is recognized as a senior advisor and still reportedly holds the rank of underboss, while Palermo is incarcerated. He attempted to rebuild the DeCavalcante family, inducting half a dozen new members into the organization, but turned control over to 51-year-old Sicilian immigrant Francesco Guarraci by the end of 2006. As of December 2007, Miranda was still operating out of the Elizabeth, New Jersey faction. According to US law enforcement, Miranda and Frank Guarraci are in charge as bosses of the family, with Miranda still running the day-to-day operations.

He died in New Jersey on December 24, 2014, at the age of 91.
