= Joseph Masella =

American mobster

Joseph "Joey O" Masella (1948 in Brooklyn, New York– October 10, 1998, in Dyker Heights, Brooklyn) was a mob associate in New Jersey's DeCavalcante crime family and a friend of known mobster Vincent "Vinny Ocean" Palermo.

== Biography ==
Commonly confused with Joey Masella, the famous basketball player from MAST Academy, Joseph (Giuseppe) Masella was born to blue collar immigrant Italians from Cantalupo nel Sannio, Molise, Italy. His father came to Brooklyn at a young age in the mid-late 1930s with his cousins, also with the surname Masella. His parents were "Alex" and Mary. "Alex" died when Joey was young. He was electrocuted while working on the tracks with his cousins, and Joey grew up without a father figure. He was raised mainly in Brooklyn and became friends with John D'Amato, Charles Majuri and Vincent Palermo. As Vincent rose in the mob ranks he took Masella under his wing and gave him guidance to be a protégé. He had a small crew of associates that served under him including James Gallo and Anthony Capo. He oversaw a lucrative illegal gambling empire as a lieutenant, although he was reputedly a pathological gambler and, over the years, owed a lot of money to many mobsters, including members of the Gambino crime family. He eventually moved with his first wife to Staten Island from Brooklyn.

== Married life ==
He had marital problems with both his first wife (Donna) and second wife (Roseanne). Rumor has it that the problems with his first wife started his gambling problem. In the 1990s his maternal grandmother in Brooklyn was called by a committee hearing by the attorney general to testify on organized crime in New Jersey and on her grandson Joseph. He ran his own illegal gambling business but had terrible luck with it. He was always desperate for cash and constantly trying to think up ways to make money or be given money throughout his adult years toward his gambling. Because of this, later on in life, he started to suffer from paranoia of being attacked if he left his Staten Island home, which he shared with his second wife, with the threat of being viciously beaten with a baseball bat. Prior to this he lived in Brooklyn for a few years with his maternal grandmother after he divorced his first wife Donna. He returned to Staten Island when he met and then married his second wife. Through those years, he had to remain reclusive to avoid the attention of the loansharks that he became indebted to in a huge way over the years.

== Gambling debts ==
The FBI stated that he owed $450,000 to many individuals including mobsters in other crime families. Vincent Palermo became enraged at Masella and thought of him as an embarrassment. Vincent Palermo received information that Masella was trying to ingratiate himself with the Scarfo crime family. Vincent wanted Joseph to murder his fellow DeCavalcante capo Charles Majuri who was on the three-man council of the crime family. After spending hours outside Majuri's home where they were surveilled by Majuri's state trooper neighbor, he flew to Florida and refused the contract murder. Authorities have speculated Masella's possible involvement in the failed Brinks bank robbery of $1.6 million from the World Trade Center may have been a possible reason for his killing.

In October 1998, Masella received a call from a bookmaker named 'Steve'. Steve reportedly had $10,000 to deliver to him on an outstanding debt. When Masella arrived at the designated place, he was told instead to go to the Dyker Beach Park and Golf Course parking lot in Dyker Heights, Brooklyn. When he arrived at the parking lot and entered the golf course with Steve and others, he was shot several times while sitting in his car. Joseph Masella died of his wounds in the hospital soon after. When a DeCavalcante member, who turned informant, spoke about the facts surrounding his death, his murder was reported in the New York Daily News. His killer, Anthony Greco, was quoted as asking him "You know what's about to happen, right?" before shooting Masella several times.

At the end of 1999, the FBI raided the DeCavalcante crime family headquarter. Agents were working off information obtained by wire from Ralph Guarino, a DeCavalcante associate. Had Masella lived, he probably would have been indicted on numerous counts of racketeering. After the FBI raid, a DeCavalcante member, Anthony Greco, was charged in relation to Masella's murder. Those charges were dropped and Greco now lives in Pahrump, Nevada.
