= Polizzi =

Polizzi may refer to:

- Polizzi (surname)
- Polizzi Generosa, a town in the Province of Palermo on the island of Sicily, Italy
