= Schifilliti =

Schifilliti is an Italian surname. Notable people with the surname include:

- Dean Schifilliti (born 1968), Australian rugby league footballer
- Giuseppe Schifilliti (born 1938), American mobster
