= Gaspare D'Amico =

Gaspare D'Amico (22 September 1886 – 1975) was a bootlegger and a powerful Mafia figure in New Jersey, US.

== Biography ==
D'Amico was born in Villabate, Sicily. He and his brother immigrated to the United States prior to the arrival of their parents and sister. D'Amico ran his own family based in Newark, New Jersey. He rivaled other families for power and control of illegal rackets in Newark. His family controlled bootlegging and gambling operations throughout the early 1920s. In 1935, Vincenzo Troia, a former associate of Salvatore Maranzano, conspired to take over the Newark family and was murdered. Two years later in 1937, D'Amico fled the United States after a failed assassination attempt on his life ordered by Joseph Profaci. The Commission decided to divide up his territory among the Five Families and the Badami's Elizabeth family.
