= Phil Amari =

Italian American mobster (1899–1963)

- Born: December 15, 1899; Ribera, Agrigento, Sicily, Italy
- Died: September 24, 1963 (aged 63); Arcadia, Los Angeles, California

Filippo "Phil" Amari (1899–1963) was an Italian American mobster who was the early boss of what would become the DeCavalcante crime family. He succeeded Stefano Badami as the boss of the New Jersey mob after Badami was gunned down by assassins in 1955. As boss, he was involved in drug trafficking and labor racketeering, with a legitimate job as a loan officer in the finance industry. He also owned (or claimed to own) a liquor store, and had no previous criminal record. He resigned as boss in 1957 and ceded control to Nicholas Delmore.
