= DeCavalcante crime family =

Italian-American organized crime family

- Family namesake Simone DeCavalcante
- Founded: c. 1900s
- Founder: Phil Amari
- Named after: Simone DeCavalcante
- Founding location: Elizabeth and Newark, New Jersey, United States
- Years active: c. 1900s–present
- Territory: Primarily North Jersey, with additional territory in Central Jersey, New York City and Waterbury, as well as Las Vegas, South Florida and Ribera
- Ethnicity: Italians as "made men" and other ethnicities as associates
- Membership (est.): 50 made members and 80 associates (1990); 40 made members and 50+ associates (2004)
- Activities: Racketeering, gambling, bookmaking, loansharking, extortion, labor racketeering, drug trafficking, bootlegging, hijacking, theft, fencing, fraud, corruption, money laundering, prostitution, pornography, assault and murder
- Allies: Bonanno crime family; Cleveland crime family; Colombo crime family; Gambino crime family; Genovese crime family; Lucchese crime family; Patriarca crime family; Philadelphia crime family
- Rivals: Various gangs in New Jersey, including their allies

The DeCavalcante crime family, also known as the North Jersey crime family or the North Jersey Mafia, is an Italian American Mafia crime family that operates mainly in North Jersey, particularly in Elizabeth, Newark, Linden, West New York and the surrounding areas. The family is part of the nationwide criminal network known as the American Mafia.

The DeCavalcante family operates on the opposite side of the Hudson River from the Five Families of New York City, and maintains strong relations with each of the New York families, especially the Gambino family, as well as with the Philadelphia crime family and the Patriarca crime family of New England. The organization is considered by some to be the "Sixth Family".

The family's illicit activities include bookmaking; corruption; drug trafficking; extortion; fencing; fraud; hijacking; illegal gambling; money laundering; murder; prostitution; and cement, construction, and waste management racketeering.

== History ==
=== Early Newark family ===
In the city of Newark, New Jersey, Italian criminals were divided into two ethnic factions; the "Sicilians" and the "Neapolitans". The Sicilian Mafia faction was headed by Stefano "Don Steven" Badami, while the Neapolitan faction was led by Ruggiero "the Boot" Boiardo.

In 1920, Prohibition began in the United States, presenting many gangs with the opportunity to make a lot of money through bootlegging, the production, importing, transportation and selling of illegal alcohol. With large amounts of money to be earned, violence erupted throughout cities and towns in New Jersey as criminals fought for control of illegal bootlegging rackets, with the two most powerful bosses in Newark being Boiardo and Jewish gangster Abner "Longie" Zwillman.

By the early 1920s Boiardo had controlled a number of lottery games, a large extortion racket from shaking down merchants for protections money, and a large bootlegging operation. Boiardo was very overweight but a very flashy dresser, often wearing a belt buckle studded with 150 diamonds that had an estimated worth of $20,000, a five-carat diamond ring, and a fifteen-diamond pin to hold his tie in place.

Boiardo secured control of the First Ward, which was known as Newark's Little Italy, and operated an extensive bootlegging operation in Newark and throughout New Jersey. Zwillman was based out of the Third Ward, where he controlled one of the largest bootlegging enterprises in New Jersey.

In early 1930, Boiardo ordered his First Ward gang to expand into the Third Ward territory and began demanding that saloon owners buy liquor from him. This started the Newark bootleg wars, which lasted several weeks as Boiardo's First Ward gang waged war against Zwillman's Third Ward gang. In late 1930, both Boiardo and Zwillman decided to end the war after numerous failed assassination attempts against each other.

During Thanksgiving week of November 1930, more violence erupted as another assassination attempt was made against Boiardo which he survived after a gunman fired a shotgun into his car, hitting his neck, mouth, chest and arm with thirteen slugs. In early December 1930, Boiardo was released from the hospital, only to be arrested by the police for having a gun in his possession during the assassination attempt on him. Later he was sentenced to two and a half years in prison.

At the same time that Boiardo was on trial for gun possession, Zwillman was imprisoned for assault and began serving six months in jail. After being released from prison, Boiardo and Zwillman ended the fighting.

Meanwhile, across the river, a bloody Mafia war, known as the Castellammarese War, broke out in New York City in February 1930 as Sicilian Castellammarese Mafia boss Salvatore Maranzano challenged New York City Mafia boss Joe "The Boss" Masseria for the position of capo dei capi. In Newark, the Sicilian boss Badami joined Maranzano's alliance, while Neapolitan boss Boiardo sided with Masseria.

On April 15, 1931, Masseria was murdered, leaving Maranzano the most powerful mobster in America. Maranzano appointed Badami the boss and Sam Monaco the underboss of the Newark family.

On September 10, 1931, Maranzano was murdered, leaving Badami without protection from his enemies. Days later on September 13, 1931, the bodies of Badami's underboss Sam Monaco and top member Louis Russo were found floating in Newark Bay. The loss of Monaco and Russo caused Badami to flee Newark, leaving the family without leadership. The Newark family broke apart, as many members joined the Gagliano family's Jersey crew, while the remaining members stayed with Gaspare D'Amico.

D'Amico had moved to Newark during the early 1920s, settling in the Northeastern neighborhood of Woodside. After D'Amico took over as boss, he faced a number of rebellions against his leadership. In 1935, D'Amico was challenged by Vincenzo Troia for control of the Newark family, but he acted quickly and ordered Troia and his associates murdered.

The second challenge to D'Amico leadership occurred in 1937, when Salvatore Lombardino and others attempted to murder him but failed. During the assassination attempt D'Amico's father was murdered. Fearing for his life, D'Amico fled to Puerto Rico, where he died in October 1975. It was later discovered by the Commission that Profaci family boss Joseph Profaci had backed Lombardino and had ordered the assassination attempt on D'Amico.

The Commission decided to disband the Newark family, while declaring Newark an open city and dividing the family's territory among the Five Families of New York. The Luciano-Genovese family's New Jersey faction grew in power as Richard Boiardo became the family's caporegime of the Newark crew and powerful New Jersey mobster Willie Moretti became the family's underboss, while also controlling operations in Bergen county. The Gagliano family's Jersey crew caporegime was Settimo "Big Sam" Accardi, a former member of Badami's Newark family, who controlled operations in Newark and North Jersey. The Mangano family's Newark crew was controlled by Antonio Paterno, a former member of the Newark family. The Profaci family's New Jersey crew was led by Salvatore Lombardino, the man behind the attempted murder of Newark boss D'Amico. The Bonanno family's Newark crew was led by Antonio Riela. The city of Newark also had other gangsters fighting for dominance and territory, including the Philadelphia crime family, which had formed their own North Jersey crew, Zwillman, who maintained strong ties with Luciano and Moretti, and former Newark boss Badami, with his own small group.

=== Early Elizabeth family ===
In the city Elizabeth, New Jersey the Mafia faction was made up of mostly immigrants from Ribera, Sicily. The Mafia group was based out of the Peterstown section of Elizabeth. The earliest known boss the Elizabeth Mafia faction was Filippo "Big Phil" Amari. He was born in Ribera, Sicily and arrived in Elizabeth in the early 1920s. During Amari's time as boss he recruited Emmanuel Riggi, Louis "Fat Lou" LaRasso and Frank Majuri into his Mafia faction. Over the years Amari continued to grow in power and was recognized by US law enforcement as being heavily involved in extortion, labor racketeering, loansharking, and narcotics activities in Elizabeth and Newark.

After fleeing Newark "Don Steven" Badami relocated in Orange, New Jersey. Badami continued operating a small Mafia group while working alongside other Mafia families. Badami was unsuccessful in taking over the Elizabeth Ribera Mafia faction because he had been born in Corleone, Sicily.

On March 31, 1955, Badami was murdered in a Newark restaurant, being stabbed 40 times. The police held Frank Monaco as a witness in the murder; he confirmed that he was the brother of Sam Monaco, a former associate of Badami who was murdered in 1931.

In 1956, Nicholas "Nick" Delmore became boss after Amari retired and moved back to Sicily. Delmore was a longtime member of the Elizabeth faction, going back to the Prohibition era, when he owned the Maple Shade Inn in Berkeley Heights and worked with Abner Zwillman in some brewery operations.

In September 1930, Delmore became a fugitive following the killing of a federal Prohibition agent. Delmore was arrested in 1933 and charged with murder, but was later acquitted. In 1957 Delmore attended the infamous 1957 Apalachin Convention to represent the Elizabeth family of New Jersey, with his underboss Frank Majuri and capo Louis LaRasso.

Delmore ran the Elizabeth family until the early 1960s, when he became ill. In 1964, Delmore died and his nephew Sam DeCavalcante was installed as new boss of the Elizabeth family. Under DeCavalcante's regime the Commission began to recognize the Elizabeth family as an autonomous crime family and officially recognized it as the "DeCavalcante crime family" of North Jersey.

=== Sam DeCavalcante ===
The official criminal organization began with Sam DeCavalcante, known as "Sam the Plumber" and "The Count". He was born in 1912 and was involved in illegal gambling, murder, and racketeering for most of his life. He rose to power in 1964, and he was incarcerated in 1969. He doubled the number of made men within his family during the 1960s. He died of a heart attack in 1997 at age 84.

DeCavalcante owned Kenilworth Heating and Air Conditioning in Kenilworth, New Jersey as a legal front and source of taxable income, for which he gained the nickname "Sam the Plumber". He also claimed to be of Italian royal lineage, earning him the nickname "The Count".

DeCavalcante and 54 associates were charged and tried in 1969. He pleaded guilty to operating a gambling racket turning over $20 million a year, and was sentenced to five years in federal prison. At the same time, a New York State report indicated that his family, as well as another Mafia family, controlled 90 percent of the pornography stores in New York City. In the early 1980s, DeCavalcante retired to Florida, leaving capo Giovanni Riggi as acting boss of the family. He largely stayed out of Mafia business, although the FBI believed that he was still advising the family into the early 1990s.

=== John Riggi ===
After DeCavalcante left prison in the mid-1970s, he appointed Giovanni "John the Eagle" Riggi as acting boss of the family while he stayed semi-retired in Florida. DeCavalcante stepped down as boss officially in 1980, passing leadership to Riggi, who had been a business agent for Local 394 of the Laborers' International Union of North America in New Jersey for years.

Once Riggi was promoted to the position of official boss, he reaped the enormous benefits of large labor and construction racketeering operations, as well as loansharking, illegal gambling, and extortion activities. Riggi also had the family maintain their old traditions, which Sam DeCavalcante had seen as unnecessary. In 1981, bosses and underbosses of the DeCavalcante and Colombo families attended a conclave in Dyker Heights, Brooklyn, to divide territory in Miami.

Riggi used his power and influence to place subcontractors and workers at various construction projects around the state, and the DeCavalcantes were able to steal from union welfare and pension funds. Riggi continued to run the family throughout the 1980s, with underboss Girolamo "Jimmy" Palermo and Stefano Vitabile as consigliere, after Frank Majuri died of health problems. Around the mid-1980s Riggi fell increasingly under the influence of Gambino crime family boss John Gotti.

After Riggi's conviction for racketeering in 1990 he appointed John D'Amato as acting boss of the family. D'Amato was later alleged to have participated in homosexual acts and was murdered in 1992. Riggi continued to run the family from his jail cell, but appointed Giacomo "Jake" Amari as his new acting boss.

All was seemingly settled until Amari became ill and died slowly of stomach cancer in 1997. This caused a massive power vacuum within the family, with many high-ranking members pushing for the role of boss.

=== The Ruling Panel ===
After acting boss Amari's death, Riggi organized a three-man ruling panel in 1998 to run the day-to-day business of the crime family, consisting of Girolamo Palermo, Vincent Palermo (no relation), and Charles Majuri, with Stefano Vitabile as the reputed consigliere and adviser to the three.

The Panel infuriated longtime captain Charles Majuri, who had been a hardworking member of the family since his teens and felt that he was wronged when he was not selected as the only acting boss. To gain complete control of the DeCavalcante family, Majuri decided that he should murder Vincent Palermo, leaving himself in charge of the family. Majuri contracted soldier James Gallo to murder Vincent Palermo.

Gallo was, however, a strong ally and friend of Vincent Palermo's, and told him about Majuri's plans. In retaliation, Vincent Palermo decided to have Majuri murdered. After one plot fell through, the murder was eventually called off.

=== Informants and convictions ===
Toward the late 1990s, the Ruling Panel kept running the DeCavalcante crime family with Giovanni Riggi still behind bars as the boss. The downfall of the DeCavalcante family was precipitated in 1998, when an associate named Ralph Guarino became an FBI informant in an effort to avoid a long prison sentence in connection with taking part with two others in a heist of $1.6 million from the World Trade Center. Guarino spent ten years undercover working for the FBI. He wore a listening device and recorded conversations that mobsters would have about criminal business. During Guarino's time as an informant, fellow mobster Joseph Masella was gunned down on the orders of Vincent Palermo.

Using information provided by Guarino, US law enforcement launched a large-scale arrest on December 2, 1999 of over 30 members and associates of the DeCavalcante crime family. Palermo realized they would likely spend the rest of their lives behind bars and decided to cooperate with the FBI in exchange for a lenient sentence. This resulted in the arrest of twelve more men less than a year later, decimating the crime family's hierarchy and putting it on the brink of extinction. Other top members, such as Anthony Rotondo and Anthony Capo, also agreed to become government witnesses.

In 2001, 20 mobsters were charged with racketeering, seven murders, fourteen murder conspiracies, attempted murder, extortion in the construction industry, and stock fraud. This was the fourth indictment of the family since 1999. Since then, several other top mobsters agreed to become government witnesses in exchange for being given lenient sentences, or even no sentences at all. US law enforcement even charged Giovanni Riggi, who had been hoping to be released in 2003, and sentenced him to ten additional years in prison.

=== Current position and leadership ===
Between 1999 and 2005, about 45 men were imprisoned, including the family's consigliere and seven capos. With the decline of the DeCavalcante family, New York's Five Families have taken over many of the rackets in northern New Jersey. Riggi was in jail until November 27, 2012, and died in 2015. Longtime acting boss Francesco Guarraci died of cancer in 2016.

In March 2015, the FBI arrested 10 members and associates of the crime family on charges of conspiracy to commit murder and distribution of drugs, including 71-year-old captain Charles "Beeps" Stango and 72-year-old consigliere Frank Nigro. Associates Rosario Pali and Nicholas DeGidio were convicted on April 4, 2017, after pleading guilty to distributing more than 500 grams of cocaine. DeGidio was sentenced to one and a half years in prison, and Pali was sentenced to over six years. Luigi Oliveri was charged with possession of contraband cigarettes and sentenced to six years in prison.

In March 2017, Stango was sentenced to ten years in federal prison for conspiracy to commit murder. Stango reportedly wanted Nigro and associate Paul Colella to get permission from the New Jersey hierarchy to kill Luigi Oliveri, but the murder was not committed because Stango did not get an answer. Prosecutors claimed that Stango and his son had plans to open a high-end escort service in Toms River, New Jersey.

In 2016, Anthony Stango Jr. was sentenced to six years in prison after pleading guilty to using a telephone in interstate commerce to conduct a prostitution operation, conspiring to distribute five grams or more of cocaine, distributing more than $70,000 worth of cocaine, and possessing a shotgun as a convicted felon.

In 2015, longtime member Charles "Big Ears" Majuri became the new official boss of the family.

In July 2022, capo Charlie Stango was released from federal prison and went into a New York halfway house.

On January 2, 2023, longtime family member and former influential capo Paolo "Paul" Farina died of natural causes at the age of 96.

In late 2025, family boss Charles Majuri began to step into retirement while shifting power to Domenico "Mimmo" Marzullo, Majuri's successor as the family's boss. Majuri died of natural causes on September 6, 2026, aged 85.

== Historical leadership ==
=== Boss (official and acting) ===
^{Excluding: Stefano Badami the boss of the Newark family late 1920s–1931, when he fled and Gaspare D'Amoco the boss of Newark family late 1931–1937, when he fled}

- 1920s–1956 — Filippo "Phil" Amari — retired ^{Elizabeth}
- 1956–1964 — Nicholas "Nick Delmore" Amoruso ^{Elizabeth}
  - Acting 1962–1964 — Sam DeCavalcante — became official boss ^{Elizabeth}
- 1964–1982 — Simone "Sam the Plumber" DeCavalcante — retired ^{Elizabeth}
  - Acting 1970s–1982 — Giovanni "John the Eagle" Riggi — became official boss ^{Elizabeth}
- 1982–2015 – Giovanni "John the Eagle" Riggi – died of prostate cancer on August 3, 2015 ^{Elizabeth}
  - Acting 1989–1990 — Gaetano "Corky" Vastola — imprisoned
  - Acting 1990–1992 — John "Johnny Boy" D'Amato — murdered in January 1992 ^{Elizabeth}
  - Acting 1992–1997 — Gioacchino "Jake" Amari — died of stomach cancer on June 14, 1997 ^{Elizabeth}
  - Ruling panel — 1997-1999 — Girolamo "Jimmy" Palermo, Vincent "Vinnie Ocean" Palermo and Charles "Big Ears" Majuri — members arrested
  - Ruling panel — 2000-2004 — Girolamo "Jimmy" Palermo, Stefano "Steve the Truck Driver" Vitabile and Giuseppe "Pino" Schifilliti
  - Acting 2005–2007 — Joseph "Joe the Old Man" Miranda — stepped down ^{Elizabeth}
  - Acting 2007–2015 — Francesco "Frank" Guarraci — became street boss; died on April 14, 2016 ^{Elizabeth}
- 2015–2026 — Charles "Big Ears" Majuri ^{Newark} — died on September 6, 2026
  - Acting 2025–present — Domenico "Mimmo" Marzullo

=== Street boss ===
A "street boss" will sometimes run several crews at once.

- 2015–2016 — Francesco "Frank" Guarraci — mentioned by Charles Stango in December 2012 wiretaps as "Horse"; died on April 14, 2016
- 2016–2021 — Joseph "Milk" Merlo — died on June 3, 2021

=== Underboss (official and acting) ===
^{Excluding: Sam Monaco the underboss of the Newark family late 1920s–1931, until he was murdered on September 10, 1931}

- 1920s–1956 — Nicholas "Nick Delmore" Amoruso — became boss ^{Elizabeth}
- 1956–1957 — Francesco "Fat Frank" Majuri — became consigliere ^{Elizabeth}
- 1957–1964 — Simone "Sam the Plumber" DeCavalcante — became boss ^{Elizabeth}
- 1964–1982 — Louis "Fat Lou" LaRasso — demoted ^{Elizabeth}
  - Acting 1970s — Giovanni "John the Eagle" Riggi — became acting boss ^{Elizabeth}
  - Acting 1970s–1982 — Girolamo "Jimmy" Palermo — became official underboss
- 1982–2004 — Girolamo "Jimmy" Palermo — convicted
  - Acting 1991–1992 — Gioacchino "Jake" Amari — became acting boss
  - Acting 2003–2005 — Joseph "Joe the Old Man" Miranda — became acting boss
- 2007–2014 — Joseph "Joe the Old Man" Miranda — died in 2014
- 2016–2024 — Joseph "Little Joe" Giacobbe, Jr.
- 2024–present — Charles "Beeps" Stango

=== Consigliere (official and acting) ===
- 1920s–1957 — Unknown
- 1957–1983 — Francesco "Fat Frank" Majuri — died in 1983 ^{Elizabeth}
  - Acting 1982–1983 — Stefano "Steve the Truck Driver" Vitabile — became official consigliere
- 1983–2006 — Stefano "Steve the Truck Driver" Vitabile — sentenced to life imprisonment in 2006, conviction overturned in 2008, released in 2013
  - Acting 2002–2003 — Frank D'Amato — arrested
- 2006–2007 — Francesco "Frank" Guarraci — became acting boss
- 2007–2016 — Frank "Goombah Frankie/Shipe" Nigro — arrested 2015
- 2016–2026 — Giuseppe "Pino" Schifilliti — died on October 10, 2026

== Current members ==
=== Administration ===
- Boss — Unknown
- Acting boss — Domenico "Mimmo" Marzullo — (born in March 1964) — Marzullo was born in Avellino. By March 1966, Marzullo lived in New Jersey located on 157 Chestnut Street in Montclair, Essex County. Marzullo is related to Girolamo Palermo and Simone Palermo. Marzullo first became associated with the DeCavalcante family through DeCavalcante member, Joseph Amato. In 1982, Marzullo operated a grocery store located on 117 Grove Street in Montclair, the grocery store was later renovated to a café and deli. In December 1984, Marzullo had received an Apostolic Blessing which was presented by the brothers by the Our Lady of Mount Carmel Church. By the late 1990s, Marzullo was reporting to DeCavalcante family capo, Francesco "Hotel Frankie" Polizzi, and was heavily involved in loansharking and illegal gambling by 1999. In October 2000, Marzullo attended a meeting among Frank "Frankie the Beast" Scarabino and Salvatore Polizzi, the meeting was concerning the conspiracy to murder DeCavalcante family cooperators, Vincent Palermo and Anthony Capo. In July 2003, Marzullo was indicted for illegal gambling, extortion and loansharking, he pled guilty to illegal gambling and extortion in February 2004 and was sentenced to 29 months in prison, he was released from prison in October 2006. In 2018, Marzullo married Adriana Russo. According to informants in October 2025, Marzullo had been elevated to the position of acting boss.
- Underboss — Charles "Beeps" Stango — is current underboss. Stango is a former capo who operated a crew in Elizabeth. On March 12, 2015, Stango was indicted with Paul Colella, his son Anthony Stango, on charges of conspiracy to commit murder, drug trafficking, and prostitution. On March 28, 2017, Stango was sentenced to 120 months after being convicted. In July 2022, Stango was released from federal prison and went into a New York halfway house. In 2024, Stango was promoted to Underboss for the family.
- Consigliere — Unknown

=== Caporegimes ===
- Louis "Louie Eggs" Consalvo — capo of his brother-in-law Philip Abramo's "New York City-New Jersey crew". In June 1999, Consalvo, along with Philip Abramo, Philip Gurian, Glen Vittor, and Barry Gesser were charged with mail fraud, wire fraud, securities fraud, interference with commerce by extortion, conspiracy to commit money laundering, and witness tampering. In 2004, Consalvo pleaded mail fraud, wire fraud, and securities fraud, and received a 27-month jail sentence. In 2000, Consalvo was indicted and charged with murdering former underboss Louis "Fat Lou" LaRasso in 1991 along with Gregory Rago. The indictment also charged Consalvo with selling 8,000 shares of stock in a company called SC&T International. In 2002, Consalvo accepted a plea agreement and was sentenced to 20 to 25 years in prison. In February 2012, he was released from prison.
- Luigi "Lou the Dog" Oliveri — capo operating in Elizabeth. In 2015, Oliveri was charged with possession of contraband cigarettes. Oliveri was a former member of Manny Riggi's Elizabeth-based crew.
- Gregory "Georgie Bayonne" Rago — capo operating in New Jersey. In 2000, Rago was indicted along with Louis Consalvo and charged with the 1991 murder of former underboss Louis "Fat Lou" LaRasso.

=== Soldiers ===
- Philip "Lou Metzer" Abramo — senior advisor and former capo of the "New York City-New Jersey crew", operating in Wall Street, New Jersey and Florida. His brother-in-law Louis Consalvo has been a longtime member of his crew. Abramo was a former associate of John Gotti. In June 1999, Abramo, Philip Gurian, Glen Vittor, Louis Consalvo and Barry Gesser were charged with mail fraud, wire fraud, securities fraud, interference with commerce by extortion, conspiracy to commit money laundering and witness tampering. In 2004, Abramo pleaded mail fraud, wire fraud and securities fraud and received a 70-month jail sentence and forfeited $1.1 million previously seized by the government in the Bahamas. In 2006, Abramo was sentenced to life in prison for racketeering and the murders of Fred Weiss and John D'Amato. In 2008, the conviction was overturned and he was released in 2018.
- Daniel Annunziata (born September 1938) — soldier. In September 1970, Annunziata was indicted along with Gaetano Vastola and Sam DeCavalcante for extortion and demanded payments of $20,000 from gamblers in 1966 as part of a shakedown in order for their gambling activity to continue, Annunziata's bail was held at $25,000 with a three year prison sentence.
- Jerry Balzano (born on November 14, 1962) — current soldier. Balzano was born in Brooklyn, and his family hailed from Catanzaro and Campania. By April 1986, Balzano continued to reside in Brooklyn, and later relocated to Staten Island by October 1993. Balzano may have had been associated with the Gambino family in New York before he held membership in the New Jersey DeCavalcante family. By January 2001, Balzano lived in Copiague, Long Island. In October 2003, Balzano married Lisa Frantellizzi in Bradley Beach Borough, Monmouth County, and Balzano and his wife lived in Howell Township, Monmouth by December 2004. By the early to mid-2000s, Balzano became a formally inducted member of the DeCavalcante family, and became heavily involved in trafficking marijuana and cocaine, and active in New Jersey, possibly within the Toms River area. In October 2005, Balzano was indicted for conspiracy and narcotics, and in October 2006, Balzano was sentenced to 6 years in prison, he was released in April 2007. By 2010, Balzano was heavily active in fraud, cigarette trafficking and stolen goods, he was partners with DeCavalcante family soldier, Joseph "Uncle Joey" Collina, in these crimes. In August 2010, Balzano and Collina became associated with Colombo family associate and informant, Thomas McLaughlin, with McLaughlin whom recorded Balzano discussing the purchase of stolen electronics and enlisting McLaughlin to help with the extortion of two victims based in Florida and North Carolina in September 2010, in September 2012, Balzano was sentenced to 19 months in prison with 6 months of house arrest, he was released in 2014. By in around 2011, Balzano may have had been placed in the crew headed by DeCavalcante family capo, Frank "Chopper" Aiosa. In 2011, Balzano was arrested for the possession of a handgun and ammunition and received 4 months in prison. In May 2017, Balzano was sentenced to 11 months in prison with 21 months of supervised release for assaulting a man during a road-rage incident on the Route 17 highway in Wallkill, upstate New York, he was released in February 2018. In 2018, the Waterfront Commission of New York Harbour identified Balzano as a member of the DeCavalcante family.
- Paul "Knuckles" Colella (born 1947) — soldier. In March 2015, Colella was indicted alongside nine other DeCavalcante affiliates on charges of conspiracy to distribute cocaine, murder, promoting prostitution and purchasing 120,000 untaxed cigarettes. Colella and Charles Stango were charged with plots to commit murder.
- Carl Corsentino — soldier. His father was also a member of DeCavalcante family. Corsentino allegedly owned a funeral home on Second Avenue in Elizabeth.
- Joseph "Little Joe" Giacobbe, Jr. — former underboss.
- Anthony "Tony Marshmallow" Mannarino — senior member operating from Florida.
- Bernard NiCastro
- Frank "Goombah Frankie" Nigro — senior advisor and former consigliere. On March 12, 2015, Nigro was indicted along with other members on charges of conspiracy to commit murder, drug trafficking and prostitution.
- Joseph "Tin Ear" Sclafini (born 1938) — soldier. Sclafini served in the United States Army between 1955 and 1957. Sclafini allegedly became inducted into the DeCavalcante family in 1982. In December 1999, Sclafini was indicted on gambling, murder, conspiracy and extortion charges.
- Gaetano "Corky" Vastola (born May 1928) — former capo. According to Sammy Davis Jr., he told the House Select Committee on Crime in May 1972 that he was a friend of Vastola, including dining and playing golf on several occasions. Vastola's first arrest was by the NYPD in 1946 for burglary and resulted in a suspended sentence and probation. In 1960, Vastola was given a one-year sentence for committing an offense against trademarks and was fined $500. In October 1970, Vastola was handed a five-year prison sentence for extortion in interstate commerce, and in March 1972 he was convicted of conspiracy to commit extortion for which he received a sentence over two and a half years. In September 1986, Vastola was indicted for conspiracy to extort money and threaten violence, conspiracy to distribute and possession with intent to distribute heroin and cocaine, and extortion. In May 1989, Vastola was sentenced to 20 years imprisonment and fined $70,000.
- Stefano "Steve the Truck Driver" Vitabile (born 1937) — soldier and former consigliere between 1983 and 2006. In June 2006, Vitabile was sentenced to life imprisonment for ordering the November 1991 murder of Louis "Fat Lou" LaRasso, a DeCavalcante capo, and for the January 1992 murder of DeCavalcante family acting boss John D'Amato. The conviction was overturned in 2008, and he was released in 2013.

=== Associates ===
- Dennis R. Horin (born March 21, 1947) — current associate. Horin was born in Elizabeth, Peterstown, and his mother hailed from Sicily, and his father worked in the garment industry by at least 1950. Horin graduated from the Thomas Jefferson High School in Elizabeth, New Jersey in 1965. By the 1980s, Horin became associated with the DeCavalcante family and held membership for Local 394 of the LIUNA. By September 1983, Horin resided in Toms River, New Jersey. In 1985, Horin was appointed as the Welfare Plans Administrator for Union County Health and Welfare Benefits Office Fund and held the position until December 2000, he later became an administrator with the Statewide Benefits Office. In 2001, Horin received the Sons of Peterstown Social Club's "Man of the Year Award" for his service to the Peterstown community and for his philanthropy efforts including contributions to the St. Joseph Orphanage based in Agrigento, Sicily. In 2005, Horin was listed as a senior manager for thne Statewide Benefits Office until 2006. In 2009, Horin served as a director of the Association of Benefit Administrators. As of 2026, Horin resides in Toms River, New Jersey, and Horin is one of the few alleged New Jersey organized crime affiliates with no criminal record, and is noted as a successful and wealthy philanthropist and businessman.
- John "Johnny Balls" Capozzi (born 1981) — associate of the Stango crew. In September 2016 Capozzi was sentenced to two and a half years in prison with two years of supervised release for distributing cocaine, after he had sold more than one-half a kilo of cocaine to an undercover FBI agent for at least $78,000 between December 2014 and March 2015.
- Nicholas Degidio — associate of the Stango crew. In 2015, he was charged with cocaine distribution.
- Mario Galli (born 1992) — associate of the Stango crew. In August 2016, Galli was convicted of conspiracy to distribute 500 grams or more of cocaine, and he was sentenced to over two years in prison with three years of supervised release and a fine of $1000. In July 2020, Galli was sentenced to six years and four months in prison for possession with intent to distribute cocaine and possession of a firearm, loaded with twelve rounds of ammunition.
- James Heeney (born September 1979) — associate. In March 2015, Heeney was indicted for conspiring to distribute more than 500 grams of cocaine from between August 2012 and March 2013, of which he had sold more than one-half a kilo of cocaine to an undercover FBI agent for $30,000, and he pled guilty in December 2015, Heeney was sentenced by former U.S. District Judge William H. Walls to 5 years in prison.
- Anthony "Whitey" Stango — associate of his father Charles Stango's crew. In 2015, Stango was indicted and charged with conspiracy to distribute cocaine and run a prostitution business.
- Rosario Pali (born on February 10, 1984) — current associate. Pali's family hailed from Campania. Pali currently holds membership in Ribera Club and Vallatese Club based in Elizabeth, New Jersey, as well as membership in LIUNA Local 394. By his early 20s, Pali was heavily involved in drug dealing. In February 2004, Pali was arrested for participating in a cocaine deal and his bail was set at $11,500. In September 2007, Pali was convicted in Union County for selling narcotics on the grounds of a school campus, he began his sentence in December 2007 and he was released in September 2011. Upon his release, Pali was identified as an associate of the DeCavalcante family and as a member of the crew headed by DeCavalcante family capo, Emanuel P. Riggi, and had been reporting directly to Luigi "Lui the Dog" Oliveri, whom is currently a capo in the family. In April 2017, Pali was sentenced to over 6 years in prison with 3 years of supervised release, however he was released from custody in March 2020.

== Former members ==
- Michael "Jersey Mike" Aquilante (born on January 31, 1916) — former soldier. Aquilante was born in Bridgeport, Connecticut, and his family hailed from Campania, the Aquilante family resided on 512 4th St in Upper Roseville by 1930. By 1940, Aquilante and his wife resided on 51 Davenport Drive in Newark, and later relocated to Fairfield in Connecticut. In September 1960, he was arrested for illegal gambling, along with Ralph Belvedere, Vincent Pollina and Gaetano "Tommy the Blond" Vastano. In March 1963, he was arrested by the Bridgeport Police Department for illegal gambling and was fined $50. In February 1969, he was again arrested by the Bridgeport Police Department for illegal gambling, and around this time, Aquilante was reporting to DeCavalcante family capo, Michael "Mickey Poole" Puglia. In April 1972, Aquilante was surevilled attending the funeral of Gambino family soldier, Isadore "Jerry" Castiglione, in Ansonia, Connecticut, along with Joseph LaSelva, Salvatore "Midge" Annunziata, Frank Piccolo, Paolo Agresta, Cosmo Sandalo and Thomas DeBrizzi. By 1974, he was residing on 2625 Park Ave in Bridgeport. In March 1975, he had refused an interview with the FBI located at the New Orleans Athletic Club on North Rampart St. He died in November 1985.
- Joseph "Joe" Amato (born on August 10, 1928) — former soldier. Amato was born in Sicily. In 1953, he married Alfonsa Palermo in Sicily, and the couple immigrated to the United States in 1954, residing on 75 Anna St in Elizabeth, and Amato worked as a laborer and salesman for the Garden State Brickface and Siding company. By 1958, Amato was possibly inducted as a member of the DeCavalcante, or may have had been transferred from a Mafia family based in Sicily. Amato served as the President of the Ribera Club located on 3rd Ave and John St in Elizabeth by the 1960s. By the early 1970s, Amato operated the Val Sand Fill company located on 610 3rd Ave in Elizabeth, along with Stefano Vitabile and Louis LaRusso. In January 1973, Amato was arrested by the Elizabeth, New Jersey Police Department for an unknown charge. By August 1975, Amato resided on 407 Redcliffe Street in Elizabeth, New Jersey. He died in August 2021.
- Virgil Alessi (born on June 1, 1932) — former capo. Alessi was born in Manhattan, and his family hailed from Sicily and Campania, the Alessi resided on 5-34 47th Ave in Long Island City, Queens, and his father was a post office clerk. In July 1950, Alessi deserted the 82nd Airborne Division at Fort Bragg, North Carolina, from the U.S. Army, and in November 1950, he was arrested by the FBI and was sentenced to serve one year at the United States Disciplinary Barracks in New Cumberland, Pennsylvania, he was released 9 months later. In December 1957, he was arrested for illegal gambling following a raid by the NYPD located in a building in Queens. By 1958, Alessi was residing on 47-10 Vernon Blvd in Long Island City. In February 1958, he was arrested by the NYPD in Manhattan for unlawful entry and was acquitted a week later, he also had a case of illegal gambling acquitted in March 1952. In June 1958, he was arrested for armed robbery for the sum $11,000 in cash, and was held on $7,500 bail. By 1962 or 1963, Alessi was arrested at least five times for illegal gambling in Queens. By 1963, he had resided on 11-25 46th Rd in Long Island City. In November 1964, he was arrested by the NYPD in Queens for illegal gambling, and by April 1965, he was sentenced to 30 days in prison with a $100 fine. In August 1971, he was arrested by the Suffolk County, Long Island Police Department for heroin trafficking following a six month undercover investigation of which Alessi was accused of having heroin brought into the United States from Italy and the product was then mixed in North Amityville and packaged for street sale which earned Alessi and his crew $100,000 weekly, Alessi was charged with conspiracy to sell and assault, and was held on $10,000 bail. In January 1972, he was indicted by the USAO Eastern District of New York, along with Henry Uvino, Salvatore Graziano and Joseph "Joe Dirt" Cesario for heroin trafficking, and was released on $25,000 bail, after the Suffolk Police Department and the U.S. Justice Department's organized-crime task force had seized 110 pounds of 96% pure heroin. In February 1972, Lucchese family soldier, Vincent Papa, was arrested by the FBN for narcotics conspiracy and reportedly had $1 million in cash on his possession, Alessi was reportedly in the presence of Papa when he was arrested. According to information by an FBI confidential informant in June 1972, Alessi had an interest in an luncheonette on Jackson Avenue, between 48th and 50th Avenues in Queens, and was implicated by the informant as heavily involved in illegal gambling, narcotics and stolen goods. By July 1972, Alessi operated the Scott's Pub located on 29th Street and 39th Avenue in Queens. In April 1974, Alessi was suspected of shooting 38-year old Louis LaSerra once or twice in his head, and his body was found floating in Manhattan's East River. By 1975, Alessi resided on 30-48 36th St in Astoria. In July 1975, Alessi was indicted for criminal contempt. In August 1975, Alessi was indicted by the US Attorney's Office for the Southern District of New York after he was accused of distributing 40 to 45 kilos of heroin and cocaine worth more than $7 million from between 1968 and 1973 as part of a 14-member dope ring, and was held on $50,000 bail. By 1976, Alessi was transferred to the New Jersey DeCavalcante family from possibly the New York based Colombo family and was placed on record with DeCavalcante family soldier, Anthony Carubia. In November 1976, Alessi pleaded guilty at the USDC in Manhattan for evading around $9,000 worth in income taxes and distributing one-half pound of heroin, and in January 1977, he was sentenced to 15 years in prison with 12 years of probation. In July 1977, his associate, Vincent Papa, was stabbed to death whilst in prison. In August 1978, Alessi was mentioned during an Long Island Newsday article as a close associate of high-ranking Bonanno family member, Carmine Galante, within the heroin trade. In September 1989, Alessi was accused of murdering DeCavalcante family associate, Joseph Garofano, after Garofano had made statements that led others to suspect he was susceptible to police pressure. In January 1990, Alessi had met with Sammy Gravano, the underboss of the Gambino family, and with Bartolomeo "Barry" Nichilo, an associate in the Genovese family, outside Gravano's construction office in Gravesend, Brooklyn, as the trio had organised the plan to have Nichilo lure Gaetano "Corky" Vastola to his death. Alessi was accused of participating in the November 1991 murder of Louis LaRusso, whom had served as the underboss of the family, as LaRusso was accused of instigating another coup attempt of seizing control of the family. In December 1991, acting boss of the DeCavalcante family, Jake Amari, had appointed Alessi as a captain in the family. In March 1992, Sammy Gravano testified that Alessi was a member of the DeCavalcante and spoke about the plot to murder Gaetano Vastola. In July 1992, Alessi was indicted by the USAO EDNY for murder conspiracy, along with John Riggi and Barry Nichilo, in June 1993, he pleaded guilty to racketeering conspiracy, and was sentenced by U.S. District Judge I. Leo Glasser to 46 months in prison with 3 years of supervised release, he was transferred to FCI White Deer, Pennsylvania and began his sentence in April 1994, Alessi was released from prison in April 1997. He died in July 1998.
- Salvatore "Little Sal" Timpani (born on September 24, 1943) — former soldier. Timpani was born in Sicily, and arrived in New York in December 1956 aboard the S.S. Queen Federica ship. It is believed that Timpani was associated with the DeCavalcante family by the early 1970s, and was residing on 449 Fourth Ave in Peterstown, New Jersey. In January 1973, he was arrested for illegal gambling. Timpani may have had been inducted as a member of the DeCavalcante family along with Carmelo "Melio" Cocchiaro by December 1976 at the Ange and Min's Restaurant in Kenilworth, New Jersey, and was placed in the crew headed by DeCavalcante family capo, Louis "Fat Lou" LaRasso. By the early 1980s, Timpani was residing in Toms River, New Jersey and was employed with the 394 Hod Carriers Union in Elizabeth, New Jersey, and by 1982, he lived on 36 3rd Ave in Neptune City, New Jersey. In May 1982, he was indicted for racketeering. In June 1982, Timpani and John Riggi, the boss of the DeCavalcante family, oversaw the induction of James "Jimmy Pitt" Gallo, Anthony Rotondo and Gaetano "Corky" Vastola as newly inducted members of the family. In October 1989, Timpani, John Riggi, Girolamo Palermo, John Riggi Jr. and Vincent Riggi were indicted by the US Attorney's Office for the District of New Jersey for racketeering. Timpani was convicted of extortion from a racketeering trial that had begun in May 1990, and in October 1990, he was sentenced to 8 years in prison and began serving his sentence at FCI La Tuna in Texas in January 1991, he was released from prison in June 1992 and was placed in the crew headed by DeCavalcante family capo, Giuseppe "Pino" Schifilliti, along with James Gallo, Francesco "Joe" Gatto, Lorenzo "Larry" Giacobbe, Francesco "Cheech" Guarraci, James Castaldo and Mike Lombardo. In August 2003, Timpani pleaded guilty to extortion, and in February 2004, he was sentenced by former U.S. District Judge, Michael Mukasey, to 18 months in prison with 3 years of supervised release, and was serving his sentence at FCI Allenwood Medium in Pennsylvania, before he was released in January 2005. He died in January 2014.
- Jake Amari (born on March 14, 1945) — former acting boss. Amari was born in Sicily, and arrived to New York in August 1946 aboard the S.S. Marine Angel. During the early 1960s, Amari returned to Sicily was accused of murdering a police officer, and relocated to the United States fleeing the murder charge, returning to the United States from Rome in May 1962, residing on 227 John Street in Peterstown, New Jersey. By 1968, Amari was employed with the Hod Carriers Union Local 394 in Elizabeth. By August 1977, Amari was inducted as a member of the DeCavalcante family, and by 1980, he was residing on 612 3rd Ave in Elizabeth, New Jersey. In November 1980, Amari was photographed with John Riggi, Stefano Vitable, Rudy Farone, Vincent Rotondo and Giuseppe Schifilliti, attending the wedding reception of Sicilian Mafia member, Giuseppe Bono. By the 1980s, Amari was promoted to the position of captain by John Riggi, the successor to Sam DeCavalcante. In December 1989, Amari along with John Gotti, the boss of the New York based Gambino family, presided over a ceremony which oversaw Anthony Capo and Francesco "Cheech" Guarraci become members of the DeCavalcante family, Guarraci was sponsored by Amari, whom later became the acting boss of the family from between 2007 and 2015, before dying in April 2016. In 1991, Amari was promoted as the acting underboss of the family and oversaw the extortion of the Asbestos Workers' Union Local 1030. In 1992, the imprisoned DeCavalcante family boss, John Riggi, promoted Amari as the acting boss of the family, and promoted Virgil Alessi as a captain in the family. In September 1992, Amari was temporarily arrested for extortion and was released from custody on the same day. He died in June 1997.
- Alessio "Albert Al Bar" Barrasso (born on September 26, 1906) — former soldier. Barrasso was born in Newark, New Jersey, and his family hailed from Campania, as a child, he was residing on 230 Academy Street in Newark, and later by 1915, moved to 264 Newton Street based in Springfield/Belmont, Newark, New Jersey, and relocated to 72 Prospect Street in North Ironbound, Newark by 1918. In around 1934, Barrasso was first arrested for an unknown charge, and was believed to have associated with the DeCavalcante by the late 1930s. By 1940, Barrasso lived on 61 Chestnut Street in North Arlington. In January 1941, he was arrested for operating an illegal gambling den or operation located on 717 Elm Street in Kearny, New Jersey, and in June 1941, he was sentenced to one year of probation with a fine of $1000. In October 1942, he was arrested by the FBI for failure to notify local draft board of address change located on 545 South Clinton St in East Orange, New Jersey, and was released on $500 bail. By 1950, Barrasso lived on 03 Abbington Ave in Bloomfield, New Jersey with his second wife. In May 1951, he was arrested by the FBI in Newark along with John Giorgio, Angelo Grasso, Frank Raimondi and Peter Surdi for transporting approximately $20,000 worth of stolen Canadian Savings Bonds, and was released on $25,000 bail. By the late 1950s, it is believed that Barrasso was inducted as a formal member of the New York based Colombo family and was placed in the crew headed by Colombo family capo, Salvatore Lombardino, although according to other informants and prosecution witnesses that Barrasso was a member of the Genovese family and was reporting to Genovese family capo, Ruggiero "Richie the Boot" Boiardo. By 1960, he was residing on 113 Willard Ave in Bloomfield. It is believed that by the late 1960s that was associated with Sam DeCavalcante, the namesake and family boss of the New Jersey Mafia. According to information by an informant in October 1969, Barrasso owned a hair salon in Bloomfield, New Jersey. In December 1969, he was arrested along with Joseph Caruano, Joseph Ferrara, Joseph Ippolito and Charles Majuri by the US Attorney's Office in Newark for illegal gambling. By January 1970, he was arrested for not having a valid New Jersey driver's license and was involved with driving Sam DeCavalcante to his dentist appointments. In March 1971, he was sentenced to 5 years in prison with a fine of $10,000 for his December 1969 gambling charge, and began serving his sentence in September 1972. According to information by an informant in October 1972, Barrasso planned to visit Santo Trafficante Jr., the boss of the Florida family, regarding information concerned about the killing of his friend, Emanuel Cammarata, whom was a friend of Barrasso since the 1920s, Cammarata was shot between six to eight times in North Miami, Florida, Barrasso was released from prison by 1974. By information from a informant in October 1974, Barrasso was transferred from the New York based Colombo family to the New Jersey DeCavalcante family. In October 1978, Barrasso and Sam DeCavalcante were ordered by a Judge from the US Tax Appeals Court to pay taxes and penalties earned from illegal gambling during 1968 and 1969. By 1980, Barrasso was residing in Point Pleasant, New Jersey. He died in July 1988.
- James Bartlet "Jimmy Dirt" Castaldo (born July 30, 1955) — former soldier. Castaldo was born in Neptune, New Jersey, and his family hailed from Campania and Agrigento. Castaldo and his family later resided in Elizabeth, New Jersey by the early 1960s. Castaldo served in the U.S. military during the 1970s. By the 1980s, Castaldo became associated with the DeCavalcante family. In 1987, Castaldo served as the business manager of the Local 1030. By the late 1980s, Castaldo was reporting directly to Emanuel P. Riggi or Gioacchino "Jake" Amari, both capos in the family at the time. In September 1992, Castaldo and James Gallo were indicted for extortion in connection to Local 1030. It is believed Castaldo had attempted to enlist Gallo in the plot to murder DeCavalcante family capo, Pino Schifilliti, Gallo relayed the order to Vincent "Vinny Ocean" Palermo, Jake Amari and Stefano Vitabile, and it was decided that Castaldo was ousted from the family by September 1992. In September 1993, Castaldo was sentenced to 18 months in prison for bribery and racketeering, and upon release, he was allowed to associate with the DeCavalcante family again. In 1998, Castaldo moved to Elizabeth, New Jersey. In May 1998, it was reported that Castaldo had met an affiliate of the Russian Mafia concerning the murder of his secretary. In 1998, Castaldo was sentenced to 7 years in prison for solicitation to murder. By 2009, Castaldo operated the Renda Enterprises LLC, a construction industry company, and by August 2010, Castaldo and DeCavalcante family associate, Gerald "Jerry" Pica, were involved in the extortion of contractors involved in the construction of the Skyway Golf Course in Jersey City, in particular in December 2010, Castaldo was involved in the extortion of a contractor received $10,000 from a debt for the amount of $76,000. In February 2015, Castaldo was indicted for extortion and was sentenced to 51 months in prison in March 2016, he was released from prison in October 2018. He died in July 2024.
- Gerald "Jerry" Nave Sr. (born on October 27, 1937) — former soldier. Nave was born in Newark, New Jersey, his family hailed from Campania and Benevento. By the 1950s, Nave was first arrested and released in August 1956, and whilst on parole, he had been sentenced to 30 days in prison for larceny. In November 1962, Nave was arrested for the assault of a police officer, along with Joseph LaMorte, whom later LaMorte was inducted into the Lucchese family by the 1980s, in November 1963, Nave was sentenced to 2 years in prison for the assault. In October 1970, Nave was sentenced to 5 years of probation and a $2000 fine for the sale of stolen goods. In January 1979, Nave was sentenced to 2 to 3 years in prison for marijuana trafficking and possession and also for illegal gambling. In February 1983, according to a report by Senate Hearings on Organised Crime, he was identified as a Lucchese family associate, and affiliated with Lucchese family capo, Anthony "Tumac" Accetturo. In May 1984, Nave was added to the exclusion list by the New Jersey Division of Gaming Enforcement and also added to the Delaware Gambling Exclusion List. By the 1980s, Nave resided in Union, New Jersey. In around November 1995, Nave's daughter, Monique Nave, had married Genovese family associate, Vincent Coppola. By the mid-1990s, Nave was identified as an associate of the DeCavalcante family. By 2001, according to law enforcement Mafia charts, Nave was identified as a soldier for the DeCavalcante family and placed in the crew headed by DeCavalcante family capo, Joseph Ferrara. Nave may had been inducted alongside Frank D'Amato and Charles A. Stango by at least April 2001. In December 2005, Nave was indicted for cocaine trafficking and was sentenced to 10 years in prison in July 2006. He died in March 2021.
- Nicholas Cottone (born on July 5, 1937) — former soldier. Cottone was born in Manhattan, and his family hailed from Sicily. By 1950, Cottone resided in Queens Village. Cottone relocated to New Jersey by 1967 and became associated with the DeCavalcante family. By June 1973, Cottone served as the maintenance superintendent for the Burlington County’s Building, and by January 1974, he was the assistant inspector for the Burlington County's Building. During the early to mid-1970s, Cottone became associated with the Republican Party in Bordertown Township, with some informants claiming that he was the head of the Republican Party in Bordertown. By June 1975, Cottone resided in Toms River, Ocean County. In 1976, he married Judith Shea. During the 1970s, Cottone established the C&S Contractors, a plumbing business, along with Tim Shea. By 1978, Cottone and his wife lived at the Smithville Mansion in Eastampton Township. By the late 1970s, Cottone was promoted to the position of Building and Grounds Superintendent for the Burlington County's Building. In August 1979, Cottone was briefly suspended for utilising county resources for non-county construction work connected to the Burlington County Republican Committee, and was possibly involved in other corruption schemes by this time. By December 1993, Cottone lived in Mount Holly, Burlington County. By 1999, Cottone was a soldier in the crew headed by DeCavalcante family capo, Joseph "Jo-Jo" Ferrara. He died in December 2022.
- Stefano Badami (December 10, 1888 – March 31, 1955) — former boss. Badami was an early Sicilian Mafia boss who led Newark's first ethnically Sicilian Mafia family. During the Castellammarese War, Badami sided with Salvatore Maranzano and was rewarded when Maranzano won by being named the boss of the Newark family. Days after Maranzano was murdered on September 13, 1931, Badami's underboss Sam Monaco and top member Louis Russo were found dead floating in Newark Bay. Badami went into hiding and his Newark family broke apart, as many members joined the Jersey crew of Tom Gagliano's family, and the remaining united under Gaspare D'Amico. In 1937, Newark Mafia boss Gaspare D'Amico fled the country; this ended the independent Newark family, as the remaining members joined the five families of New York. Badami attempted to keep control of some illegal rackets in Newark, New Jersey but in 1955, he was murdered during a power struggle between rivals.
- Paolo "Paul" Farina — former capo. Farina died on January 2, 2023, at the age of 96.
- Rudolph "Tootsie" Farone
- James "Jimmy" Gallo
- Francesco "Frank" Guarraci — died on April 14, 2016.
- Charles "Big Ears" Majuri — former boss. Majuri was born on December 29, 1940. He was the son of former consigliere Frank Majuri. Upon Gioacchino Amari's death, Giovanni Riggi appointed Majuri as one of the members of the "Ruling Panel", along with Girolamo Palermo and Vincent Palermo. In 2000, Majuri was indicted on multiple charges, including racketeering, loansharking, extortion, and conspiracy to commit murder. He was released from prison on April 28, 2009. In late 2025, Majuri has shifted into retirement allowing Domenico Marzullo to take over as the new boss. Majuri died from an infection in September 2026, aged 85.
- Joseph "Joey O" Masella
- Joseph "Joe Red" Merlo Jr. — former made member and go-between for Charles Majuri. His father Joe Merlo Sr. was a soldier under DeCalvacante family boss John Riggi, hailing from the family's Elizabeth faction. He owned Joey's Pizza on South Elmora Ave in Elizabeth. Merlo Jr. died June 3, 2021.
- Girolamo "Jimmy Dumps" Palermo — former underboss. Palermo and four other DeCavalcante mobsters were arrested on October 16, 1989 on RICO charges relating to construction industry labor racketeering at LIUNA Local Union 394 in Elizabeth. He was acquitted on July 20, 1990.
- Frank Polizzi
- Giovanni "John the Eagle" Riggi — former boss. Giovanni Riggi and two of his sons, John J. Riggi and Vincent Riggi, were among five DeCavalcante mobsters arrested on October 16, 1989 on RICO charges relating to construction industry labor racketeering at LIUNA Local Union 394 in Elizabeth. On July 20, 1990, Riggi was convicted of extortion and labor law violations.
- Vincent "Vinnie" Riggi — former soldier and son of former boss Giovanni Riggi. He was born in Elizabeth on January 27, 1951. Vincent Riggi, his brother, John J. Riggi, and father, Giovanni Riggi, were among five mobsters indicted on October 16, 1989 on RICO charges related to labor racketeering in LIUNA Local 394 in Elizabeth. He was acquitted on July 20, 1990. Riggi died of natural causes on January 20, 2026, aged 74.
- Vincent Joseph "Jimmy the Gent" Rotondo — former capo. Rotondo was involved in labor racketeering and pornography, and was an organizer for the ILA Local 1814 in Brooklyn. His son, Anthony Rotondo, was also a "made" member of the family. Rotondo headed the DeCavalcante family's operations in New York, and acted as the organization's liaison to the Five Families. He maintained close associations with the Bonanno and Colombo families, including ties to Bonanno boss Phillip Rastelli. In 1981, Rotondo attended the "Little Appalachin" Mafia summit in Dyker Heights, Brooklyn held by the leaders of the DeCavalcante and Colombo families. Along with members of the Gambino, Genovese and Colombo families, he was allegedly part of a high-level loansharking ring which illegally obtained $1.2 million from the pension funds of two Teamsters unions, Local 808 in Woodside, Queens and Local 531 in Yonkers, to fund illegal loans and used the Resource Capital Group, a Lake Success, Long Island finance company, as a front. The operation extorted up to $40,000 per week from businessmen in the New York metropolitan area in 1982 and 1983. On June 28, 1984, Rotondo was one of thirteen people indicted on loansharking and racketeering charges following an undercover FBI investigation into the scheme. He was acquitted of federal racketeering conspiracy charges in 1985. On January 4, 1988, Rotondo was killed, aged 58, by six gunshots to the head and neck as he sat in his Lincoln automobile outside his house at 2356 Royce Street in Bergen Beach, Brooklyn. The murder was allegedly ordered by Gambino boss John Gotti, due to Rotondo's growing power becoming a threat to the Gambino family. After Rotondo's killing, the Gambino family took control of the DeCavalcante family, which had previously been affiliated with the Genovese family. At Rotondo's funeral, which was attended by 40 Gambino mobsters in a show of force, Gotti summoned DeCavalcante boss Giovanni Riggi to inform him of the new arrangement. Anthony Rotondo succeeded Vincent Rotondo as capo of his father's "crew".
- Giuseppe "Pino" Schifilliti — former consigliere. In 2003, he was indicted for racketeering, as well as the murders of Louis LaRasso and John D'Amato. In 2006, he was sentenced to life in prison, but that conviction was overturned in 2008. Schifilliti died from natural causes on October 10, 2026, aged 88.
- Salvatore "Sal the Barber" Timpani — former soldier. Timpani was born in Torregrotta, Sicily and immigrated to the United States at the age of 12, settling in New Jersey. He was a barber by trade before becoming a member of LIUNA Local Union 394 in Elizabeth. Timpani, a Toms River resident, owned a multi-million dollar concrete company in Central New Jersey. On October 16, 1989, he was one of five mobsters indicted on RICO charges related to labor racketeering in Local 394. Timpani was convicted of extortion on July 20, 1990. On August 14, 2003, Timpani and three other mobsters pleaded guilty to racketeering. He died in Venetico, Sicily on January 9, 2014, aged 70.

== Former associates ==
- Michael John Squicciarini (born on May 21, 1956) — former associate. Squicciarini was born in Middle Village, Queens and his family hailed from Apulia. By 1979, Squicciarini was a bouncer at the Stoney End discotheque in Long Branch, Monmouth County, and around this time, he was residing in Rosedale, Queens. In December 1979, Squicciarini and Claudio Picca had assaulted a 15-year old customer at the club from orders of Gary Benvenuto, the disco club manager. In August 1980, Squicciarini was arrested for conspiracy and assault, and was acquitted in December 1980. In 1982, Squicciarini received a 7-year prison sentence for assault and was released in 1987. In February 1983, Squicciarini was fined $50,000 legal compensation payment for the victim of the 1979 assault. By the late 1980s, it is believed Squicciarini first became associated with the DeCavalcante family through his association with Joseph "Joe Pitts" Conigliaro. It is alleged that Squicciarini participated in the September 1992 murder of Ralph Hernandez whom was murdered for his involvement in narcotics trafficking, Hernandez was lured to the One Over Golf Club which was owned by Conigliaro and was shot several times in the head by Conigliaro, Squicciarini may had have helped dispose the body of Hernandez along with Joseph "Big Joey" Brideson, Americo "Mike" Massa and Martin Lewis. In July 1993, Squicciarini was arrested for burglary and for the possession of brass knuckles, and was tasked to steal the safe from a home in Union Township, he was released on $10,000 bond and served one year in custody. In February 1997, Squicciarini and John DeRoss, the former underboss of the Colombo family, had served as ushers in a wedding in New Dorp, Staten Island. In September 2000, Squicciarini, Dominic Chianese, Vincent Pastore and Gambino family associate, Julius Nasso, had attended a fundraiser for the American Parkinson Disease Association in Staten Island. He died in April 2001.
- Joseph "Joe Pitts" Conigliaro — former associate. In the 1970s, Conigliaro was paralyzed when he and James Gallo attempted to shoot a loanshark victim who they suspected was an informant but accidentally shot one another. He was involved in extortion, loansharking, and drug dealing. Conigliaro was ineligible to become a "made" member of the family due to his disability but was "treated ... as a made guy", according to Anthony Capo. In July 1992, Conigliaro shot and killed a rival drug dealer, Ralph Hernandez, from his wheelchair after having Hernandez lured to a social club that he owned in Carroll Gardens, Brooklyn. He then had members of his crew dispose of Hernandez's body in a nearby vacant lot, where it was discovered over a year later. On January 23, 1998, Conigliaro was fatally shot in a contract killing organized by members of his own crew, including Joseph "Big Joey" Brideson, who accused Conigliaro of demanding too much in tribute and of becoming unstable due to cocaine use.
- Joseph Masella (born on November 9, 1948) — former associate. Masella was born in Brooklyn, and his family hailed from Molise and Campania. In the late 1960s, Masella became associated with Vincent "Vinny Ocean" Palermo. During the 1980s, Masella was associated with DeCavalcante capo, Rudy Farone. According to information from Anthony Capo, Masella was heavily involved in armed home invasions with affiliates of the Rotondo crew which was headed by DeCavalcante family capo, Vincent Rotondo, during the late 1980s, including one occasion, Masella companied Rotondo, Palermo, Capo, Frank Scarabino and Joseph Garofano, with the robbery of an elder couple in Long Island, New York, Capo posed as a police officer and Masella later disposed of the uniform and the handgun. By July 1994, Masella assisted Palermo with the operation of the Wiggles strip club in Queens, and was responsible for collecting the weekly cash profits from the strip club, he was also involved in illegal gambling and loansharking on behalf of Palermo. During the mid to late 1990s, Masella and DeCavalcante family associate, Joey Migliorato, were involved in the firebombing of a vehicle in connection to a $10,000 debt owed to Migliorato. Following the death of DeCavalcante family capo, Rudy Farone, in May 1997, Masella was formally transferred to the Vinny Palermo crew, also a capo in the DeCavalcante family at the time. In late 1997, Vinny Palermo had took control of the Manti Transportation in Staten Island, where Masella was employed. By March 1998, Masella owed debts to affiliates of the New York families, including the Lucchese, Gambino and Colombo families, as well as the DeCavalcante family. Masella was involved in the conspiracy to murder Charles Majuri, as Majuri was ordered to be killed in April 1998 by Vinny Palermo. In September 1998, Masella was assaulted by Palermo due to substantial debts owed by Masella. In October 1998, Masella was lured to a meeting at the Seaview Diner in Canarsie, Brooklyn, under the promise of obtaining $10,000 from a debtor, later on, Masella was told by DeCavalcante family associate, Anthony Greco, to meet at the Marine Park Golf Course located on 3200 Flatbush Avenue, Masella arrived at the golf course and was shot several times before he died the next day at the Brookdale Hospital. It is a possibility that Masella was ordered to be killed by Joseph "Tin Ear" Sclafani who instructed Greco and Westley Paloscio to commit the murder.

== Government informants and witnesses ==
- Anthony "Tony" Capo — former soldier and hitman for the DeCavalcante crime family. He served as the driver during the murder of Fred Weiss on September 11, 1989. In late 1991, Capo received information that DeCavalcante acting boss John D'Amato was a closet homosexual. He testified in court that consigliere Stefano Vitabile ordered D'Amato's murder. D'Amato was lured to a parked car in Brooklyn and allegedly sat in the back of the car, Capo turned around from the passenger seat and shot him four times. During one incident in the mid-1990s, he stabbed Gambino associate Renee "Remy" Sierra in his face and eye, for disrespecting him in front of a female in a Staten Island bar. Another assault occurred in the late 1990s which consisted of him beating a parking lot attendant with a steel baton, a pipe and a baseball bat, after spraying him in the face with mace, as the attendant was accused of having a fistfight with DeCavalcante captain Rudy Ferrone. In 1999, he became a government witness. He pleaded guilty to eleven murder conspiracies, participating in two murders, several assaults and many other crimes.
- Victor DiChiara — family associate who supposedly served as one of John D'Amato's shooters in 1992. DiChiara served as an associate in the crew of Philip Abramo and testified to the crew's dealings, including the beating of a union member and the murder plot against Frank D'Amato, John D'Amato's brother. DiChiara and Joseph Sclafani plotted to stab D'Amato with a hypodermic needle.
- Ralph "Ralphie" Guarino — former associate of the family, Guarino was one of the masterminds behind the 1998 Bank of America robbery which took place at 1 World Trade Center. Guarino and WTC worker Salvatore Calciano planned the heist, employing three gunmen to carry it out: Richard Gillette, Melvin Folk and Mike Reed. All three were arrested shortly after the robbery, and Guarino was arrested by FBI agents on Staten Island. Guarino became an informant following his arrest.
- Vincent "Vinny Ocean" Palermo — former acting boss during the 1990s. He married the niece of Sam DeCavalcante during the early 1960s. He was inducted into the DeCavalcante family in 1989. As a favour for Gambino crime family boss John Gotti, DeCavalcante boss Giovanni Riggi "ordered a contract" on Fred Weiss (arranged for him to be murdered) on September 11, 1989. Palermo and Jimmy Gallo shot Weiss seven times. Palermo allegedly orchestrated the October 1998 murder of his bodyguard and DeCavalcante associate Joseph Masella, who was found shot several times at a golf course in Marine Park, Brooklyn. In December 1999, he was arrested on murder, extortion, bookmaking, loansharking, illegal gambling, robbery, the sale of stolen property and counterfeit goods, and mail fraud charges, alongside 38 other mobsters from the DeCavalcante and New York crime families, including two DeCavalcante captains, Joseph Giacobbe and Anthony Rotondo. He allegedly oversaw an illegal bookmaking operation with the New York Gambino and Colombo crime families. He agreed to become a government witness in 1999, several weeks after his arrest. In October 2000, Palermo pleaded guilty to four murders, seven murder conspiracies, extortion, loansharking, gambling and obstruction of justice charges.
- Anthony Rotondo — former capo. Rotondo was born in Brooklyn, New York on June 11, 1957. His father, Vincent Rotondo, was a DeCavalcante capo who had ties to the Colombo and Bonanno crime families in New York. Anthony Rotondo was proposed for membership by his father in 1978 and inducted by Sam DeCavalcante in July 1982. In January 1988, his father was shot and killed, allegedly due to his growing power becoming a threat to the Gambino family. Anthony Rotondo was subsequently promoted to capo and took over Vincent Rotondo's "crew". He was one of 41 DeCavalcante members and associates indicted on federal racketeering charges on December 2, 1999. Rotondo became an informant in early 2003 and admitted to participation in four murders, including those of DeCavalcante associate Fred Weiss in 1989, and capo and acting boss John D'Amato in 1992. He initially testified against fellow DeCavalcante members in the trials of Girolamo Palermo, Stefano Vitabile, Guiseppe Schifiletti and Philip Abramo. He then testified against several Gambino mobsters, including Thomas "Huck" Carbonaro and Peter Gotti in November 2004, and John A. Gotti in August 2005. Rotondo died on March 8, 2025, aged 67, while living in the Witness Protection Program in Charlotte, North Carolina under the alias "Anthony Russo".
- Frank "Franky the Beast" Scarabino — former soldier. In late 1999, capo Giuseppe Schifilliti was tasked to kill Scarabino after Vincent Palermo suspected him of being an informer.
- James "Jimmy Easy" Saracco (born in June 1964) — former associate. Saracco was born in Brooklyn, growing up in Ozone Park and later Howard Beach in Queens, and his family hailed from Trapani and Campobasso. Saracco's uncle, Alfred "Freddie" Saracco, was a bar operated and associate of the New York based Colombo family, whom was murdered in September 1969. As a teenager, Saracco was heavily involved in vehicle theft and illegal gambling, later on Saracco and Joseph Lepiscopo Jr. were partners in their bookmaking operations, Saracco first became associated with Genovese family member, Federico "Fritzy" Giovanelli. In 1984, Saracco was involved in an assault which forced him to flee to Florida for over a year, and upon returning to New York, Saracco was involved in operating a club in Brooklyn with Ronald Holmes, later in January 1986, Saracco shot and wounded Holmes over a dispute. By July 1987, Saracco resided in Brooklyn. In 1988, Saracco was heavily involved in hijacking, fireworks sales and robbing drug dealers, with DeCavalcante family associate, Antonio Rocco Sarni, in particular Sarni and Saracco posed as police officers to gain access to the residences of drug dealers before robbing them. In 1989, James "Jimmy" Kolm became involved in illegal gambling with Saracco and Rudy Farone. Kolm was involved in a debt of the sum of $300,000 and later the debt settled at $225,000 during a meeting with Farone, John Gotti Jr., and Saracco and Peter Gotti, Kolm was later summoned to the Farone's Oceanside Boys Club in South Brooklyn, where he was assautled by Saracco and Colombo family member, Joe Gambale. In March 1990, Saracco was called upon to attend a meeting to the home of Gambino family associate, Michael DiAmbrosio, with John Gotti Jr., where Saracco was told to stop operating bookmaking and loansharking in the Howard Beach area, however Saracco declined. In January 1991, Saracco was spotted in Brooklyn by members of the Gotti faction, posing as policeman, whom attempted to beat Saracco to death, after his release from hospital, Saracco told Farone of his intention to murder Gotti Jr. and his crew members, however a meeting was organized and attended by Farone, John Gotti Jr., Anthony Rotondo, Vincent Palermo. In March 1991, Saracco was involved as a shooter in the murder of Salvatore Cioffi, Rudy Farone was approached by Vincent "Vinny Head" Cioffi over a scheme to murder his brother for his life insurance policy. In August 1991, Saracco murdered Vincent Cioffi. In October 1994, Saracco was arrested for a robbery plot and his bail was set at $75,000. It is believed Saracco supervised the September 1995 murder of Anthony Sarni. In October 1995, Saracco was sentenced to 18 months in prison and was released in July 1996. In January 1997, Saracco was arrested for narcotics violations from an investigation which began in 1994, among those arrested were Gambino family capo, Nicholas Corozzo, and Leonard DiMaria. By at least February 1997, he was sentenced to 4 years in prison. In June 2000, Saracco was indicted for firearms and extortion. Saracco began his cooperation in around 2000 or 2001 and pled guilty to illegal gambling, loansharking and conspiracy. In March 2005, Saracco was released from the WIP (witness protection program). In August 2011, Saracco was arrested for the sale of oxycodone.

== Factions and territories ==
The DeCavalcante family operates primarily in North Jersey, with additional territory in Toms River on the Jersey Shore, and in New York City, Connecticut and Florida. The family also has links to Ribera in Sicily, where many of the organization's members have their origins.

- New Jersey — Headquartered in the Peterstown neighborhood of Elizabeth, the DeCavalcante family operates extensively in Union, Middlesex, Monmouth, Ocean and Essex counties.
- New York — The DeCavalcante family operates in Staten Island and South Brooklyn.
- Connecticut — The DeCavalcante family operates in Waterbury.
- Florida — The DeCavalcante family operates in South Florida, including Broward County.

== List of murders committed by the DeCavalcante crime family ==
Name	Date	Reason
John Finiello	September 19, 1930	Finiello was a Bureau of Prohibition agent, and was killed for his investigation and the arrest of several liquor traffickers. It is believed Nick Delmore was involved in the murder of Finiello.
Salvatore Monaco	September 10, 1931	Monaco, along with Louis Russo, were murdered on the same day when Salvatore Maranzano was killed, and both men were possibly killed for their alliance with Maranzano.
Louis Russo	September 10-13, 1931	It is believed Russo was murdered during the Castellammarese War and was an ally of Salvatore Maranzano, although law enforcement at the time said that Russo was murdered as a result of "muscling in" on the wine brick industry in Northern New Jersey. Russo's body was found in Newark Bay, shot and tortured to death.
Vincenzo Troia	August 22, 1935	It is believed Troia was killed for attempting to seize control of the family. Troia was shot and found in a candy store in Newark, New Jersey.
Joseph Troia	August 22, 1935	Troia, along with his brother, Vincenzo Troia, were killed for attempting a coup and seizing control of the DeCavalcante family.
Stefano Badami	March 31, 1955	66-year old Badami was stabbed around 40 times and killed at the Vito's Clam Bar located on 372 15th Avenue in Newark, New Jersey due to an internal power struggle within the DeCavalcante family.
Alphonse "Zeeny" Colicchio	September 13, 1960	Colicchio was the brother-in-law to John Riggi. Colicchio was shot and killed by Girolamo "Jimmy" Palermo for insulting Nicholas "Nick Delmore" Amoruso, whom was the boss of the New Jersey Mafia at the time of his death.
Joseph "Joey Surprise" Feola	April 19, 1965	Feola was murdered by Louis LaRossa as a favor to Carlo Gambino, the head of the Gambino family from New York, as Feola had been skimming profits for himself from the waste management industry.
Vincent Capone	July/August 1976	It is believed Capone was murdered for agreeing to testify against Genovese family member John DiGilio for defrauding the U.S. government and converting FBI records. Capone was reportedly shot 15 times inside of his Cadillac vehicle in Hoboken, New Jersey.
John Suarato	July 22, 1978	67-year old Suarato, an associate for the Gambino family, was murdered by Vincent Palermo and his brother, Patsy Palermo, a soldier in the Colombo family. It is believed Suarato was killed due to an inheritance dispute between the Palermo brothers.
Billy Mann	October 16, 1980	Mann, a 44-year-old DeCavalcante family associate, was in debt to DeCavalcante administrators and had allegedly scammed a member of Genovese family capo Tino Fiumara's crew in a drug deal. He was shot by then-DeCavalcante family associate Charles Stango, whom is the current underboss of the family, in the parking lot of a Sheraton hotel in Elizabeth, New Jersey after being lured to a purported meeting. Lou Pasquarosa and Raymond Tango were also present during the killing. It also believed that Mann informed the FBI regarding a robbery of a truckload of cigarettes reportedly worth around $250,000.
George Anthony Franconero Jr.	March 6, 1981	Franconero Jr. was murdered for cooperating with law enforcement. Franconero Jr. was the younger brother to singer Connie Francis.
Vincent Rotondo	January 4, 1988	Rotondo had served as the organizer for the International Longshoreman's Association since the early 1960s. Rotondo was found in his 1988 Lincoln vehicle shot multiple times in the head and his neck, located at his home in the Bergen Beach section of Brooklyn. It is believed Rotondo also had business deals with the Colombo and Bonanno families from New York. According to authorities, Rotondo was acquitted for loansharking in 1985 and he was also implicated in the 1986 labor racketeering case involving former Bonanno family boss Phillip 'Rusty' Rastelli, and that he had operated the New York activities for former DeCavalcante family boss John Riggi. According to former DeCavalcante family associate and government witness, Victor DiChiara, former Lucchese family underboss, Anthony "Gaspipe" Casso, ordered Rotondo's murder with Anthony Senter and Joseph Testa who committed the murder.
Frederick E. "Fred" Weiss	September 11, 1989	50-year-old DeCavalcante associate Weiss was prosecuted along with members of the Gambino family for illegal waste dumping. Suspecting Weiss of becoming a cooperating witness, Gambino boss John Gotti requested that John Riggi have Weiss eliminated. On Riggi's orders, Weiss was shot outside his home in New Springville, Staten Island by Vincent Palermo and James Gallo.
Joseph Garafano	September 21, 1989	Garafano was allegedly the driver in the decoy car during the September 1989 murder of Fred Weiss, and it is believed he was murdered for replacing his car’s license plates with those belonging to the wife of the gunman's driver, Anthony Capo. Garafano may have been lured to the inside of a garage in Brooklyn by Anthony Rotondo and buried on a farm in Newburgh, New York which was owned by Philip "The Undertaker" LaMella, after he was killed by members of the Philip Abramo faction.
Louis LaRasso	November 11, 1991	The family administration voted to kill 64-year-old DeCavalcante capo LaRasso after he was deemed a threat to imprisoned boss John Riggi and acting boss John D'Amato. LaRasso was lured by Giuseppe Schifilliti to the home of a soldier, where he was killed by members of Philip Abramo's crew.
John D'Amato	January 1992	DeCavalcante consigliere Stefano Vitabile approved the killing of acting boss D'Amato after he was accused of usurpation, stealing from the family, and homosexual activity. He was buried by Vincent Palermo and Rudy Ferrone at a property in Newburgh, New York.
Ralph Hernandez	July 1992	Drug dealer Hernandez was lured by Michael Squicciarini and others to a social club in Carroll Gardens, Brooklyn, where he was shot by DeCavalcante associate Joseph Conigliaro. Hernandez's body was disposed of in a nearby vacant lot.
Joseph "Joe Pitts" Conigliaro	January 23, 1998	Conigliaro was shot 6 times in the face and chest and killed, as he had been demanding more money from his associates and skimming proceeds for himself from the illegal rackets. In December 2002, Martin Lewis was sentenced to life imprisonment for the murder of Conigliaro.
Joseph "Joey O" Masella	October 10, 1998	It is believed Masella was killed for feuding with members of the New Jersey Mafia and for acquiring large gambling debts to the family and Mob families from New York, allegedly around $450,000. Masella was ordered murdered by Vincent "Vinny Ocean" Palermo and he was lured to the Dyker Beach Golf Course in Brooklyn where he was shot multiple times. In December 1999, Anthony Greco was indicted for the murder of Masella, with Westley "Mickey the Dunce" Paloscio was accused of luring Masella to his death at the golf course, Greco was later acquitted of committing the Masella murder.
Mayir Lehmann & Albert Alain Chalem	October 26, 1999	Lehmann was found shot once in the back of his head, Chalem was shot repeatedly, and both were killed and found in Colts Neck, New Jersey. It is believed Lehmann and Chalem were possibly killed as they were suspected of being cooperative informants, although investigators believed Lehmann and Chalem were killed for their role in a $5 million scheme with the Russian Mafia, with Chalem reputedly helped Lehmann with the scheme.

== In popular culture ==
The DeCavalcante crime family is partly the inspiration for the fictional DiMeo crime family of the HBO television series The Sopranos. The family was the subject of the CNBC program Mob Money, which aired on June 23, 2010, and The Real Sopranos TV documentary directed by Thomas Viner for the UK production company Class Films.

The Pegorino crime family are a fictionalized version of the DeCavalcante crime family in the 2008 video game Grand Theft Auto IV.

== See also ==
- Crime in New Jersey
- List of Italian Mafia crime families

== Sources ==
=== Books ===
- Deitche, Scott M. Garden State Gangland: The Rise of the Mob in New Jersey. Lanham : Rowman & Littlefield, 2017
- Goldstock, Ronald; Marcus, Martin & Thacher, I.I. (1990). Corruption and Racketeering in the New York City Construction Industry: Final Report of the New York State Organized Crime Task Force. New York: NYU Press. ISBN 0-8147-3034-5.
- Jacobs, James B. (1994). Busting the Mob: The United States Vs. Cosa Nostra. New York: NYU Press. ISBN 0-8147-4230-0.
- Jacobs, James B.; Friel, Coleen & Radick, Robert (1999). Gotham Unbound: How New York City Was Liberated from the Grip of Organized Crime. New York: NYU Press. ISBN 0-8147-4247-5.
- Smith, Greg B. (2003). Made Men: The True Rise-and-Fall Story of a New Jersey Mob Family. Berkley Books. ISBN 0-425-18551-6.

=== Court proceedings ===
- United States v. Riggi, 951 F.2d 1368 (3d Cir. 1991).

=== News articles ===
- Rashbaum, William K. (October 20, 2000). "Crime Family Dealt a Blow, Police Say". The New York Times. Archived from the original on January 29, 2003.
- Rudolph, Robert (May 9, 2003). "Mob Story – How a crime family turned dysfunctional". The Star-Ledger.
- Tuohy, John William (January 15, 2000). "Round Up The Usual Suspects". Rick Parnello's AmericanMafia.com.

=== Reports ===
- Schiller, Francis E. (May 2004). The Changing Face of Organize Crime in New Jersey (PDF) (Report). State of New Jersey Commission of Investigation. Archived from the original (PDF) on April 17, 2016 – via Government of New Jersey.
- United States Congress, Senate, Committee on the Judiciary (1983). Organized Crime in America: Hearings Before the Committee on the Judiciary, United States Senate. Washington, D.C.: U.S. G.P.O.
- Zazzali, James R. (September 1990). 21st Annual Report (PDF) (Report). State of New Jersey Commission of Investigation. Archived from the original (PDF) on June 1, 2021 – via Government of New Jersey.
