= Polizzi (surname) =

Polizzi is an Italian surname. Notable people with the surname include:

- Alex Polizzi (born 1971), British television personality
- Alfred Polizzi (1900–1975), American mobster
- Frank Polizzi (1936–2001), American mobster
- Nicole "Snooki" Polizzi (born 1987), American television personality
- Olga Polizzi, British hotelier
- Rick Polizzi (born 1958), American television producer and writer
