= Giuseppe Schifilliti =

American gangster (1938–2026)

- Born: March 17, 1938; Tripoli, Italian Libya
- Died: October 10, 2026 (aged 88); Toms River, New Jersey, U.S.
- Other name: Pino
- Allegiance: DeCavalcante crime family
- Criminal charges: Murder, conspiracy, racketeering, loansharking and extortion
- Penalty: Life imprisonment

Giuseppe "Pino" Schifilliti (March 17, 1938 – October 10, 2026) was an Italian-American mobster who was a prominent member of the DeCavalcante crime family of New Jersey beginning from the 1980s on. He was heavily involved in labor racketeering and extortion activities.

== Early life ==
Schifilliti was born in Tripoli in Italian Libya, the son of Antonio and Marianna Schifilliti. He was raised in Sicily and immigrated to the United States at the age of 18, settling in Elizabeth, New Jersey in the late 1950s.

== DeCavalcante crime family ==
Toward the mid-1970s, Schifilliti was inducted into the DeCavalcante crime family, under the leadership of Simone "Sam the Plumber" DeCavalcante and early underboss, Giovanni "John the Eagle" Riggi. By starting out as a soldier, Schifilliti was hired in the same Laborers' International Union of North America at Local 1030, where he used to extort and bribe union officials to influence the power of the DeCavalcante family in construction sites, throughout the 1970s, alongside Riggi, who was then seen as the new boss of the family.

During the early 1980s, Giovanni Riggi was in total charge of the DeCavalcante family, as he promoted Schifilliti to the rank of caporegime or captain within the family. Operating out of the Elizabeth, New Jersey faction, Schifilliti became a top member of the family alongside Girolamo "Jimmy" Palermo and Stefano "Steve the Truck Driver" Vitabile, with labor and construction racketeering, extortion, illegal gambling, loansharking and money laundering as criminal activities. Schifilliti also reputedly went under the radar, and operated with huge muscle throughout the 1980s, and early 1990s without a single indictment.

In 1989, Riggi and several others were tried for racketeering and extortion charges. There was also internal rivalry brought up between the Newark and Elizabeth factions of the family. In 1990, Riggi was convicted of the charges and he was sentenced to 15 years. To make sure everyone knew he still ran the family, he ordered Schifilliti and consigliere Stefano Vitabile, to organize the murder of former underboss, Louis "Fat Lou" LaRasso, who was reported missing in 1991, as well as the then-current acting boss, John "Johnny Boy" D'Amato, who was murdered in 1992. Schifilliti was reportedly involved in both cases, as he cooperated much with Vitabile and the imprisoned Riggi.

=== Indictments and trials ===
In 2000, internal rivalry almost brought a new war to the streets of New Jersey, as prominent acting boss Vincent "Vinny Ocean" Palermo was eager to control the entire DeCavalcante crime family, as he organized the attempted murder of rival Charles "Big Ears" Majuri, but failed to kill him. Later, an indictment wave of a four-year-investigation put 50 members and associates of the DeCavalcante crime family on trial, including prominent members Schifilliti, Palermo, Stefano Vitabile, Girolamo Palermo and Philip "Phil" Abramo, with labor racketeering, loansharking, extortion, fraud, illegal gambling, murder and conspiracy to commit murder charges. As that wasn't enough, Vincent Palermo decided to turn state's evidence, as did capo Anthony Rotondo and soldier Anthony Capo, over the next year due to the indictments. Schifilliti was held against bail, and due to his age, put under house arrest and put on trial in late 2001, and 2002.

Schifilliti was tried with Vitabile and Abramo on two counts of murder and two counts of conspiracy to commit murder. He was charged with the murders of Louis LaRasso and John D'Amato, including the attempted murder of Charles Majuri. Schifilliti was convicted of racketeering, loansharking and extortion in 2003, as well as being convicted along with Vitabile and Abramo of the murder and conspiracy charges from the 1990s in late 2005. In 2006, Schifilliti was sentenced to life imprisonment along with Vitabile and Abramo.

In September 2008, a federal appeals court reversed Schifilliti's racketeering conviction and ordered a new trial.

In the 2020s, Schifilliti served as consigliere of the DeCavalcante family.

== Death ==
Schifilliti died from natural causes on October 10, 2026, at the age of 88.
