= John D'Amato =

American mobster (d. 1992)

- Born: May 12, 1941; New York City, New York, U.S.
- Died: January 6, 1992 (aged 50); New York City, New York, U.S.
- Cause of death: Murder (gunshot wounds)
- Other name: "Johnny Boy"
- Occupation: Crime boss
- Allegiance: DeCavalcante crime family

John "Johnny Boy" D'Amato (May 12, 1941 – January 6, 1992) was an American mobster and former acting boss of the DeCavalcante crime family in New Jersey from 1990 to 1992. He was a prominent made man of the DeCavalcante family and was appointed head of the organization by Giovanni Riggi under the influence of Gambino crime family boss John Gotti. D'Amato was murdered in Brooklyn in January 1992 after he was suspected of engaging in homosexual activity.

== Criminal career ==
D'Amato was a veteran gangster with a criminal record beginning in 1963, when he was arrested on gambling charges. He was convicted of burglary in 1971 and forgery in 1984. He was married to Theresa D'Amato.

After being promoted to caporegime during the 1980s by Giovanni "John the Eagle" Riggi, D'Amato became heavily involved in large labor and construction racketeering operations with prominent New Jersey mobsters Gioacchino "Jake" Amari and Girolamo "Jimmy" Palermo. D'Amato, of the powerful Elizabeth faction of the DeCavalcante crime family, was soon cooperating with high-ranking members Charles "Big Ears" Majuri and Gaetano "Corky" Vastola in illegal gambling and loansharking operations.

After longtime boss Giovanni Riggi was indicted for labor racketeering and extortion charges in late 1989, Vastola stepped up as the new acting boss of the DeCavalcante family while Riggi was on trial. It was around this time that rival Gambino crime family boss John Gotti reached out to several members of the DeCavalcante family in an attempt to gain full control of the North Jersey Mafia. One of these mobsters was D'Amato, who reportedly conspired with Gotti and his underboss Salvatore "Sammy the Bull" Gravano to murder Vastola; Gotti was later convicted of this conspiracy. The murder plot against Vastola did not go ahead because the leaders of the Genovese crime family refused to approve it. D'Amato visited Gotti's Ravenite Social Club on Mulberry Street every Tuesday, and was one of three DeCavalcante family members who attended the wedding of John Angelo "Junior" Gotti at The Helmsley Palace hotel on April 21, 1990.

Riggi was convicted of his charges and sentenced to 15 years in prison in 1990, which meant that Vastola kept running the day-to-day activities of the family. After Riggi's conviction, Vastola was convicted of major extortion charges and sentenced to eight years in prison. From behind bars, Riggi promoted D'Amato to acting boss of the DeCavalcante family.

== Murder ==
In 1991, D'Amato's girlfriend, Kelly, retaliating against him over an argument, told Anthony Rotondo that D'Amato was an active bisexual. She described swinging encounters that D'Amato had in Manhattan sex clubs with both women and men. Rotondo shared this information with underboss Jake Amari, and consigliere Stefano "Steve" Vitabile. In addition to the allegations of bisexuality, D'Amato was accused of usurpation and stealing from the family. Many family members believed that D'Amato was controlled by Gambino boss John Gotti. At a meeting in November 1991, Vitabile authorized the murder of D'Amato and suggested how and where to dispose of his body. As Anthony Capo described it in court testimony in 2003: "Nobody's going to respect us if we have a gay homosexual boss sitting down discussing La Cosa Nostra business." The three men ordered D'Amato's execution and gave the job to Anthony Capo, Vincent "Vinny Ocean" Palermo and James Gallo. In contravention of Cosa Nostra rules on the killing of a family boss, the plotters did not ask permission from the Mafia Commission in New York.

D'Amato was targeted for death shortly after returning to New York from Florida, where he had been "on the lam". On the day of the attack, an afternoon on January 6, 1992, Capo and Victor DiChiara picked up D'Amato in DiChiara's white Lincoln a block from his girlfriend's house in Brooklyn to drive to lunch. With D'Amato sitting in the back seat, Capo turned and shot D'Amato twice. When D'Amato groaned: "Oh, no", Capo shot him twice more, killing him. D'Amato was 50 years old. Capo and DiChiara then drove D'Amato's body to the home of DeCavalcante capo Rudy "Tootsie" Ferrone in Mill Basin, Brooklyn, where Ferrone and Vinny Palermo were waiting. D'Amato's pockets were searched, uncovering $8,000 in cash and the card of an FBI agent, before he was wrapped in a plastic tarp. His body was then loaded into a black Cadillac owned by Ferrone, and driven upstate by Ferrone and Palermo to a farm owned by DeCavalcante soldier Philip "The Undertaker" LaMella in Newburgh, New York where it was disposed of. D'Amato's body was never recovered.

Informed in prison of D'Amato's execution, Riggi appointed Amari as the new acting boss of the family. Shortly after the murder of D'Amato, his brother Frank was released from prison. Those responsible for D'Amato's murder decided that it was prudent to kill Frank D'Amato before he took revenge. The Decavalcante family administration voted to authorize Capo to kill Frank D'Amato, and Vitabile later told Capo to kill Frank at the first opportunity. The planned murder of Frank D'Amato never took place, however.

=== Aftermath ===
In 2003, capos Philip "Phil" Abramo, Giuseppe "Pino" Schifilliti, and the reputed consigliere Stefano Vitabile were charged in organizing various crimes, including the murder of D'Amato. Reputed men involved in the murder conspiracy, Palermo, Capo and Rotondo would later testify about this murder against their former associates. In 2006, Abramo, Schifilliti and Vitabile were sentenced to life imprisonment.

== See also ==
- List of kidnappings
- List of solved missing person cases
