= 1998 Bank of America robbery =

1998 robbery in New York City

Coordinates: 40°42′44″N 74°00′48″W

The 1998 Bank of America robbery was a bank robbery of $1.6 million in cash at the Bank of America in the World Trade Center's North Tower, in New York City, on January 14, 1998.

== Background ==
The robbery was plotted and executed by Ralph Guarino, a career criminal with connections to the DeCavalcante crime family. Guarino received some intelligence from a WTC worker named Salvatore Calciano, who told him about the increased security following the 1993 World Trade Center bombing, and what time a Brink's armored truck would arrive to deliver money via elevator to the 11th floor of the North Tower of the WTC. Calciano would later supply Guarino with an employee ID badge to use during the robbery.

The two of them planned the robbery and recruited three other criminals to complete the actual robbery: Richie Gillette, 39, from Windsor Terrace, Brooklyn, as well as his friends Melvin Folk, 44, and Mike Reed, 34.

== Robbery ==
On Wednesday, January 14, 1998, a Brink's van pulled up to the World Trade Center at around 8:30 a.m. and began unloading bags of money. Gillette was the only robber to wear a ski mask to prevent being identified. After subduing the WTC employees and guards successfully, the group proceeded to steal a total of $1.6 million (worth $3.2 million today) in money bags before exiting the WTC at 8:45 a.m.

== Capture of the robbers ==
In the aftermath of the robbery, Folk and Reed returned to their old neighborhoods and were quickly identified and captured. Gillette was questioned by security after boarding an Amtrak train but was not detained at the time. He was later found and arrested in Albuquerque, New Mexico, two days later, at 8:30 pm, January 16. The FBI did not believe the three had acted alone and began to search for a mastermind. Guarino had various ideas of how to get rid of the money but ultimately was unable to follow through on any plans before FBI agents came to arrest him at his Staten Island home. Following his arrest, Guarino agreed to become an FBI informant on the DeCavalcante crime family.

== See also ==
- List of bank robbers and robberies

== Sources ==
- Smith, Greg B. (2003). Made Men: The True Rise-and-Fall Story of a New Jersey Mob Family. Berkley Books. ISBN 0-425-18551-6.
