= Gaetano Vastola (gangster) =

American mobster

- Born: May 20, 1928 (age 98); Brooklyn, New York, U.S.
- Other name: "Corky"
- Occupation: Mobster
- Allegiance: DeCavalcante crime family
- Convictions: Burglary (1946); Trademark offenses (1960); Extortion (1972); Racketeering, conspiracy, extortion, assault (1988)
- Penalty: Suspended sentence and probation One year imprisonment and fined $215; 30 months' imprisonment 20 years' imprisonment

Gaetano "Corky" Vastola (born May 20, 1928) is an American mobster who served as a captain in the DeCavalcante crime family based in New Jersey. Vastola rose to prominence as a very wealthy “earner” through his involvement in several lucrative construction, film and musical labor rackets in both New Jersey and New York.

== Record mogul ==
In 1946, Vastola was arrested for burglary in New York City. He was convicted and received a suspended sentence and probation because he was a youthful offender.

In his early years, Vastola was a concert promoter for singers Ray Charles and Aretha Franklin, and a golf partner with actor/singer Sammy Davis Jr. A part owner of Roulette Records, Vastola was the listed songwriter on several doo-wop hits from the 1950s and 1960s, including The Valentines song "Lily Maebelle", The Cleftones song "You Baby You", and The Wrens song "Hey Girl". During this period, Vastola also engaged in the counterfeiting of music records, netting him $500,000 profit. In 1960, Vastola was convicted of trademark offenses and received a one-year suspended sentence. The Internal Revenue Service (IRS) also fined Vastola $215 for not reporting his illegal income.

== Criminal activities ==
In 1965 Vastola was arrested for a burglary and larceny. In 1969, Vastola and mobster Daniel "Danny" Annunziata had demanded a $20,000 extortion payment from the operators of an illegal dice game in Trevose, Pennsylvania. The operators appealed the demand to DeCavalcante boss Sam DeCavalcante, who allegedly reduced the demand to $12,000 plus a negotiating fee of $3,800. In March 1972, Vastola was convicted of extorting the dice game operators and was sentenced to 30 months in prison. Vastola's conviction was later overturned. By 1980, Vastola had become a captain for the family, leading a crew of mobsters in Union County, New Jersey. Vastola had a close working relationship with Jimmy Rotondo, head of the New York Wing of the family, based predominantly in Brooklyn (until the latter's death).

== Plot for Vastola's murder ==
In 1987, Vastola was sent to jail for assaulting a record company executive who balked at his extortion demands. While housed at the Metropolitan Correction Facility in Manhattan, Vastola shared a cell with Gambino crime family boss John Gotti. After spending time with Vastola, Gotti became convinced that Vastola would become a government witness rather than spend time in prison. When Gotti was released, he pressured DeCavalcante boss John Riggi to agree to Vastola's murder. In 1992, federal prosecutors charged Gotti, in this new racketeering case, with five murders, including conspiracy to murder Vastola, loansharking, illegal gambling, obstruction of justice, bribery and tax evasion.

== Prison and release ==
On May 3, 1988, Vastola was convicted of extortion and two counts of racketeering conspiracies and was sentenced to 20 years in prison. In late 1990, Vastola lost his final appeal and was sent to prison. In May 1998, Vastola was released from prison.
