= Vincent Palermo =

American mobster (born 1944)

- Born: June 4, 1944 (age 82); New York City, New York, U.S.
- Other names: "Vinny Ocean"; "James Cabella"
- Occupation: Crime boss
- Children: 5
- Relatives: Sam DeCavalcante (uncle-in-law)
- Allegiance: DeCavalcante crime family

Vincent "Vinny Ocean" Palermo (born June 4, 1944) is an Italian-American former mobster who was the de facto boss of the DeCavalcante crime family of North Jersey before becoming a government witness in 1999. Fictional mob boss Tony Soprano, the protagonist of the HBO series The Sopranos, is said to be based upon Palermo.

== Early life ==
Vincent Palermo was born in New York City in 1944, and raised in a traditional Italian-American family in Brooklyn. When Palermo was sixteen, his father died, which forced him to leave school and work two jobs to help support his family, as his mother was a bedridden asthmatic. In his earlier years, Palermo worked at a wholesale fish business in the Fulton Fish Market, where he earned the nickname "Vinny Ocean".

In the early 1960s, Palermo met and married the niece of crime boss Sam DeCavalcante of the DeCavalcante crime family. DeCavalcante took a liking to his nephew-in-law and began inviting him to visit his social club in Kenilworth, New Jersey. He worked at the fish markets in the early morning hours and hung out with mobsters on Sunday afternoons. Palermo cultivated relationships with other crime families: a lucrative loansharking operation with one Gambino family caporegime and bookmaking with another. He was also a close associate of the Genovese family. Palermo was known to say very little, speaking to only a very few close associates, and stayed away from mob-run social clubs. Until his racketeering indictment, he had only been arrested for the misdemeanor of stealing shrimp at the Fulton Fish Market.

== Murder of Fred Weiss ==
On September 11, 1989, Palermo, Anthony Capo, and James "Jimmy" Gallo murdered Staten Island resident Fred Weiss, on orders from DeCavalcante boss Giovanni "John the Eagle" Riggi through caporegime Anthony Rotondo. Weiss was a former newspaper reporter for the Staten Island Advance and a real-estate developer who had previously associated with members from both the DeCavalcante and Gambino families.

Weiss and two mob-partners had purchased a vacant property in Staten Island and started illegally dumping large amounts of dangerous medical waste there. Local authorities uncovered the scheme and started investigating Weiss, making the two crime-families nervous. Gambino boss John Gotti worried that Weiss might become a government witness in exchange for leniency and requested that the DeCavalcante family murder Weiss to protect Gambino ventures. Palermo, Capo, and Gallo drove to the New York condominium of Weiss's girlfriend. As Weiss left the building and entered his car, Palermo and Gallo shot him in the face.

== Family scandal ==
Palermo was promoted to caporegime following the Weiss murder and received his own crew of soldiers. Riggi was sent to prison later in 1989, and appointed John "Johnny Boy" D'Amato as his acting boss. In January 1992, Anthony Capo participated in the murder of acting boss D'Amato. Earlier in 1991, D'Amato's girlfriend, retaliating against D'Amato over an argument, told Anthony Rotondo that D'Amato was an active bisexual. She described swinging encounters that D'Amato had in Manhattan sex clubs with both women and men. Rotondo shared this information with underboss Giacomo Amari, and consigliere Stefano Vitabile. In 2003, caporegimes Philip "Phil" Abramo, Giuseppe "Pino" Schifilliti and Stefano Vitabile were charged in organizing various crimes, including the murder of D'Amato. Reputed men involved in the murder conspiracy, Palermo, Capo and Rotondo would later testify about this murder against their former associates.

== Power struggle ==
After Amari died in 1997, there was no clear candidate to become the new acting boss. Riggi, still in prison, restructured the family and created a ruling panel to run it in order to avoid a potential power struggle. Riggi appointed longtime members of the crime family to the panel: Vincent Palermo, Girolamo "Jimmy" Palermo (no relation to Vincent), and Charles Majuri. However, Majuri, furious that he wasn't appointed acting boss, decided to murder the two Palermos and take effective control of the DeCavalcante family. He asked Gallo to murder Vincent Palermo, but Gallo alerted Palermo about the plot.

To protect himself, Palermo decided to murder Majuri instead. Over the years, Majuri had made many enemies by removing fellow mobsters from a labor union that he controlled and taking their money. Palermo was able to recruit Capo, Gallo, and Joseph Masella to find and kill Majuri. However, on the one occasion when they were ready to kill Majuri, they became nervous and decided not to do it. When they reported their failure back to Palermo, he decided that Majuri didn't pose a threat after all and cancelled the murder contract. By the mid-90s, Palermo was the de facto boss of the DeCavalcante family, with Riggi reigning as boss in absentia from jail.

== Government witness ==
In 1998, DeCavalcante associate Ralph Guarino was arrested for stealing $1.6 million from a Bank of America inside the World Trade Center. To avoid 20 years in prison, Guarino agreed to work as an informant for the FBI, giving the agency information on the actions of DeCavalcante members. The agency gave him cell phones rigged with surveillance equipment to distribute to other family members. In October 1998, Palermo's trusted lieutenant Joseph Masella was shot to death, leaving an opening in the family. Guarino's status had been rising in the family due to secret assistance from the FBI, and after Masella's murder, Palermo and the rest of the DeCavalcante leadership promoted Guarino to made man.

In 1999, Palermo faced charges and possible capital offenses, so he decided to become a government witness. He confessed to killing Weiss and mobster Louis LaRasso, and to planning the murders of the two D'Amatos, Masella, Majuri, and Tom Salvata, the manager at Palermo's strip club. Palermo also implicated other DeCavalcante family-members in various crimes. After testifying for the government, Palermo and his family entered the federal Witness Protection Program. However, prosecutors later discovered that he allegedly gave his son Michael $1 million in cash, possibly jeopardizing his status as a protected witness.

== New life in Houston, Texas ==
On September 14, 2009, the New York Daily News exposed Palermo's new life in witness-protection as a strip-club-operator in Houston, Texas. He has been living under the name "James Cabella". Houston Police alleged that Palermo's strip clubs were a source of drug dealing and prostitution in the Houston area. Palermo claimed that many of his Houston friends already knew of his past because of an A&E television special. He lived in a gated mansion in Houston.

The day after the Daily News report, Houston NBC affiliate KPRC-TV aired an investigative segment on Palermo. Forty days later, Palermo put his Houston mansion up for sale, first for $4 million but then, over the following two years, he reduced the price to $2.45 million. After the mansion still would not sell, he took it off the market on June 3, 2011. Palermo put his house up for sale again in September 2015; it eventually sold for $2.85 million on 5 August 2016. In late 2011, the Houston Chronicle reported that Palermo was sued by the former owner of one of his strip clubs, claiming that he had only paid $5,000 of the $1.3 million selling price.

== Bankruptcy ==
On March 4, 2013, Palermo filed a Chapter 11 bankruptcy petition in U.S. Bankruptcy Court in the Southern District of Texas. Under Chapter 11, a person's assets and debts are not liquidated, but the filer is given court-protection from creditors in order to try to perform a work-out of the insolvency situation.

== Media portrayal ==
Fictional mob boss Tony Soprano, the protagonist of the HBO series The Sopranos, is said to be based upon Palermo. Similar to how Soprano worked from the fictional Bada Bing! strip club owned by Silvio Dante on the show, Palermo owned a strip club called Wiggles.
