= Anthony Capo =

American mobster (d. 2012)

- Born: July 10, 1959; New York City, New York, U.S.
- Died: January 23, 2012 (aged 52)
- Other names: "Tony"; "Marshall Beach"; "Mathew Beach"; "Wade Beach"
- Occupation: Mobster
- Children: 3
- Allegiance: DeCavalcante crime family

Anthony "Tony" Capo (July 10, 1959 – January 23, 2012) was an American hitman in the DeCavalcante crime family who later became a government witness and entered the Witness Protection Program.

== Early life ==
A resident of South Beach, Staten Island, Capo became an associate of the DeCavalcante crime family during the early 1980s under powerful Elizabeth, New Jersey faction leader Giovanni Riggi. Capo was involved in extortion and loansharking activities. He was married with three children.

In the 1980s, Capo attended school to become a certified asbestos abatement worker. However, Capo later testified that he slept during class and allowed the school's operator to take the test for him. When questioned by a federal prosecutor about his knowledge of asbestos removal, Capo replied, "I wouldn't know asbestos if I was sitting on it." Sometime in the late 1980s, law enforcement listed Capo as a soldier in the DeCavalcante family.

== Weiss murder ==
In 1989, Capo participated in the murder of Fred Weiss, a Staten Island, New York developer and newspaper publisher. Weiss was under federal investigation for illegal dumping of medical waste and Gambino boss John Gotti was afraid that Weiss might become a government witness. As a favor to Gotti, the DeCavalcantes agreed to murder Weiss.

On September 11, 1989, Capo drove DeCavalcante mobsters Vincent Palermo and James Gallo to Weiss' apartment. Palermo and Gallo shot Weiss in the face as he was entering his car. Palermo and Gallo then re-entered Capo's car, and Capo drove them away from the murder scene.

== Criminal activities ==
By 1990, Capo was working for John D'Amato and reputed capo Anthony Rotondo of the New York faction in labor racketeering, illegal gambling, extortion and loansharking activities. Capo also ran a DeCavalcante crew in New York City. Between 1986 and 1994. Capo also worked with reputed Gambino crime family mobster Joseph Watts in a loansharking racket that allegedly grossed more than $12 million.

After Riggi was indicted in 1990 for labor racketeering and extortion, he appointed Gaetano "Corky" Vastola as the new acting boss. Later in 1990, Riggi was convicted and sentenced to 15 years in prison. However, that same year, Vastola went to federal prison on a 20-year sentence on extortion charges. Riggi replaced Vastola with D'Amato as acting boss.

== D'Amato murder ==
In January 1992, Capo participated in the murder of acting boss D'Amato. Earlier in 1991, D'Amato's girlfriend, retaliating against D'Amato over an argument, told Rotondo that D'Amato was an active bisexual. She described swinging encounters that D'Amato had in Manhattan sex clubs with both women and men. Rotondo shared this information with underboss Giacomo Amari, and consigliere Stefano Vitabile. As Capo himself described it in court testimony in 2003,

"Nobody's going to respect us if we have a gay homosexual boss sitting down discussing La Cosa Nostra business."

In addition, many family members believed that D'Amato was controlled by Gambino boss John Gotti. The three men ordered D'Amato's execution and gave the job to Capo, Vincent Palermo, and James Gallo. In contravention of Cosa Nostra rules on the killing of a family boss, the plotters did not ask permission to kill D'Amato from the Mafia Commission in New York.

On the day of the attack, D'Amato, Capo and the other two hitmen entered D'Amato's car to drive to lunch. Sitting in the back seat, Capo shot D'Amato four times, killing him. Capo and Rotundo left the body at a safe house, where other mobsters disposed of it. D'Amato's body was never recovered. Informed in prison of D'Amato's execution, Riggi appointed Amari as the new acting boss.

== Majuri murder conspiracy ==
After Amari's death in 1997, Riggi and Vitabile established a "Ruling Panel" to run the family. This panel included capos Vincent Palermo, Girolamo Palermo (no relation) and Newark faction leader Charles Majuri. However, Majuri wanted to control the family himself, and he asked Gallo to murder Vincent Palermo. Instead, Gallo told Vincent about the plot. Vincent now decided to murder Majuri and enlisted Capo and Gallo in the plot. On the day of the attack, Capo, Gallo, and DeCavalcante mobster Joseph Masella went to Majuri's house to ambush him. However, Majuri did not return home. After several hours, the hitmen drove away. After the failed murder attempt, Vincent Palermo decided to cancel the murder contract.

During the mid-1990s, Capo stabbed a Gambino associate named Remy in the eye at a Staten Island bar. Capo was flirting with a girl there when Remy interrupted their conversation. Capo objected and Remy cursed at him. Capo then stabbed Remy in the eye and the face. When describing this incident in court in 2003, Capo said he thought Remy had a gun and described him as a "violent individual".

== Indictments ==
In December 1999, Capo and the DeCavalcante leadership were indicted on charges of labor racketeering, extortion, loansharking, murder, and conspiracy to commit murder. Prosecutors charged Capo with the 1989 Weiss murder, the 1992 D'Amato murder, and involvement in two other murders.

To avoid a life sentence for murder, Capo became a government witness. He later testified against the DeCavalcante family, Colombo crime family boss Joel Cacace, and Genovese crime family capo Federico Giovanelli. Capo also warned prosecutors that a stenographer working in the Manhattan office of the U.S. Attorney was passing sensitive information, including lists of suspects, to Giovanelli.

== Death ==
Anthony Capo died after a heart attack on January 23, 2012, aged 52. He and his family were in the Federal Witness Protection Program.
