= Gioacchino Amari =

American gangster (1945–1997)

- Born: March 14, 1945; Ribera, Sicily, Italy
- Died: June 14, 1997 (aged 52); Monmouth County, New Jersey, U.S.
- Other name: "Jake"
- Occupation: Crime boss
- Known for: Acting boss of the DeCavalcante crime family
- Allegiance: DeCavalcante crime family

Gioacchino "Jake" Amari (March 14, 1945 – June 14, 1997) was an Italian-American mobster who served as acting underboss and later acting boss of the DeCavalcante crime family of New Jersey.

== Criminal career ==
Amari served as a "consultant" for Local 394 of the Laborers' International Union of North America, a local union that represented hod carriers, common laborers and other construction workers in Northern New Jersey. The DeCavalcante crime family had dominated Local 394 for years, using their control over that union to extort construction employers, provide "no-show" jobs, and loot the union's treasury and its pension and benefit funds.

According to the testimony later provided by Vincent "Vinny Ocean" Palermo, who became the acting boss of the DeCavalcante crime family after Amari's death, Amari was a prominent and ruthless captain before being promoted to the acting underboss after the imprisonment of longtime family boss Giovanni "John the Eagle" Riggi in 1992. Riggi appointed a ruling panel to take control of the DeCavalcante crime family until his release, but the acting boss of the panel, Gaetano "Corky" Vastola, was arrested and jailed as well.

John D'Amato was then appointed as acting boss. D'Amato's reign was short, as it soon became clear that he had been recruited by the Gambino crime family and had been conspiring to murder Vastola. Later in 1991, D'Amato got into an argument with his girlfriend, who was also involved with Anthony Rotondo. She told Rotondo that when she and D'Amato were out at clubs during the evenings, D'Amato would be swinging and have sex with other men.

Rotondo reportedly became quite upset that someone within the family was taking part in homosexual acts and shared his suspicions with Amari, the crime family's underboss, and Stefano Vitabile, the powerful consigliere. They decided to have D'Amato murdered after informing the incarcerated Riggi. They later obtained the other captains' approval of D'Amato's murder, but without informing them he had already been killed. Amari became acting boss of the DeCavalcante crime family in 1992.

=== Sitdown with New York ===
During the mid-1990s, Amari and Vitabile, now the most powerful members of the family, were present in a sit down with representatives of the Gambino and Colombo crime families in New York City, as the DeCavalcante crime family had been recruiting reputed Mafia associates Louis "Louie Eggs" Consalvo and Gregory Rago, who together operated a social club on Mott Street and held criminal interests in New York City. The only problem was that, since these two mobsters were based in New York, their earnings from these activities should have been subject to one of the Five Families, in this instance, either the Gambino crime family or the Colombo crime family. Reputed Gambino family captain Nicholas "Little Nick" Corozzo and Colombo family consigliere Vincenzo "Vinny" Aloi were present during the sitdown. The conflict was eventually resolved peacefully when it was ruled the DeCavalcante crime family could no longer "make" members outside of New Jersey and South Philadelphia, another area from which the DeCavalcantes had traditionally recruited.

=== Death and aftermath ===
Amari was diagnosed with terminal stomach cancer in 1995 and died on June 14, 1997. His death threatened to reignite the factional conflicts between family members vying for leadership after his death. Riggi therefore installed a new ruling panel, made up of Vincent Palermo, Girolamo “Jimmy” Palermo (no relation) and Charles Majuri, to head off any internecine warfare.

That attempt to avoid outright hostilities did not, as it turned out, prevent Majuri from attempting to murder the two Palermos so that he could take over the crime family. However, the gang member whom Majuri asked to commit the murders instead informed Vincent Palermo, who made plans to kill Majuri first. That plan also failed when Majuri did not leave his home when expected.

Palermo, who became the de facto boss of the DeCavalcante crime family in the aftermath, ultimately decided that Majuri was not a real threat and cancelled the contract on him. Majuri eventually succeeded Palermo as boss after Riggi's death and Palermo's decision to testify against his family members and enter the witness protection program.

== In popular culture ==
A strong resemblance suggests that the fictional character Giacomo "Jackie" Aprile, Sr. of the HBO hit series The Sopranos was loosely based on Amari. They both become acting boss of the New Jersey crime family, only to die of cancer and spark a massive power vacuum between rival factions within their crime families.
