= Girolamo Palermo =

American mobster (1938–2014)

- Born: May 16, 1938; Elizabeth, New Jersey, U.S.
- Died: February 6, 2014 (aged 75); Elizabeth, New Jersey, U.S.
- Other name: "Jimmy"
- Occupation: Mobster
- Allegiance: DeCavalcante crime family

Girolamo "Jimmy" Palermo (May 16, 1938 – February 6, 2014) was an Italian-born American mobster and longtime underboss of the DeCavalcante crime family in Elizabeth, New Jersey, under the imprisoned boss Giovanni "John the Eagle" Riggi.

== Murder of Al Colicchio ==
On September 13, 1960, Palermo allegedly murdered Alphonso "Zeeny" Colicchio. Colicchio was the owner of a bar and grill in Elizabeth, New Jersey who had been disrespectful to DeCavalcante boss Nicholas Delmore. On Delmore's orders, Palermo and other DeCavalcante mobsters entered Colicchio's bar and started beating him. When Colicchio resisted, Palermo allegedly shot him to death. Palermo kept the murder quiet for the sake of fellow DeCavalcante mobster Riggi, who was Colicchio's brother-in-law.

== From made man to underboss ==
In the late 1970s, Palermo became a made man, or full member, of the DeCavalcante family. With the retirement of boss Simone "Sam the Plumber" DeCavalcante, Riggi became the family boss and designated Palermo as his underboss.

== Racketeering acquittal ==
In 1989, Riggi and Palermo, along with several other associates, were put on trial for racketeering and extortion by illegally using Local 394 of the International Association of Laborers and Hod Carriers, to extort jobs, goods and services from the construction industry in New Jersey. Additionally, Riggi used his power and influence to place subcontractors and workers other than laborers at various construction projects around the state. In this way, Riggi and the DeCavalcantes were able to rip-off union welfare and pension funds. In 1990, Giovanni Riggi was sentenced to 15 years in prison, while Palermo was acquitted on his racketeering charges.

== On the ruling panel ==
During the 1990s, acting boss Giacomo "Jake" Amari died of stomach cancer, which triggered a huge power vacuum between several mobsters who were trying to reorganize the DeCavalcante crime family. But Palermo and Consigliere Stefano "Steve the Truck Driver" Vitabile were loyal to the imprisoned Riggi, and decided to create the "Ruling Committee/Panel", which consisted of three various capos who were to run the family's day-to-day activities. Vincent "Vinny Ocean" Palermo (not related to Jimmy Palermo) and Charles "Big Ears" Majuri, together with Jimmy Palermo who was demoted to Caporegime, were placed on the panel, which went as an administration of "street bosses" in the 1990s.

== Riggi's acting boss ==
After Vincent Palermo became only one of the mobsters turning state's evidence after 2000, as well as increased law enforcement pressuring the entire DeCavalcante crime family, the imprisoned Riggi used Jimmy Palermo along with Stefano Vitabile and Giuseppe "Pino" Schifilliti as the family's acting bosses. Palermo became a victim of his own success, as he was indicted on labor racketeering, extortion and two murder conspiracy charges, and ultimately put under house arrest in 2004. On February 6, 2014, Palermo died of natural causes in Elizabeth, New Jersey at the age of 75.
