= Giovanni Riggi =

American mobster (1925–2015)

- Born: February 1, 1925; Newark, New Jersey, U.S.
- Died: August 3, 2015 (aged 90); Edison, New Jersey, U.S.
- Other name: "John the Eagle"
- Occupation: Crime boss
- Criminal penalty: 12 years' imprisonment (1992); 10 years' imprisonment (2003)
- Spouse: Sara DiLeo (m. 1950; died 2000)
- Children: 7

Giovanni "John the Eagle" Riggi (February 1, 1925 – August 3, 2015) was an American mobster and member of the DeCavalcante crime family since the 1940s, before the family had acquired its name. Riggi was the leader of the "Elizabeth crew" in the family when he was a caporegime. He had been the acting boss during the 1970s and became the official boss around 1982. Riggi was incarcerated at the Federal Medical Center (FMC) Devens, Massachusetts, on extortion and labor racketeering convictions. He was released on November 27, 2012, before dying on August 3, 2015.

== Early career ==
John Riggi was born on February 1, 1925, in Newark, New Jersey. After graduating from Linden High School in Linden, New Jersey in 1942 he joined the United States Army, where he worked as an engine mechanic.

Riggi became involved in organized crime activities after his return to civilian life. John was following the example of his father, Emmanuel Riggi, who was a close friend of Nick Delmore, the head of the organized crime outfit in Elizabeth, New Jersey, that later became known as the DeCavalcante crime family. Emmanuel Riggi was a business agent for Local 394 of the Laborers' International Union of North America, also known as the Hod Carriers' Building and Common Laborers' Union, and was sentenced to two year years in prison in 1957 on racketeering charges.

== Becoming the Boss ==
Riggi rose within the ranks of the DeCavalcante crime family after Sam DeCavalcante succeeded Delmore, being given responsibility for overseeing the family's interests in Local 394. By 1969 he had become a capo within the family.

When DeCavalcante was imprisoned in 1971 Riggi was named acting boss. Riggi became boss of the DeCavalcante family after DeCavalcante moved to Florida after his release from prison.

Riggi reaped the benefits of extensive labor and construction racketeering, loansharking, and illegal gambling activities, as well as a large legitimate income. Riggi also had the family maintain their old traditions. Although the Genovese crime family had always had outsized influence over the DeCavalcante crime family's operations, Riggi developed a close friendship with new Gambino crime family boss, John Gotti.

== Prosecution and imprisonment ==
In 1990, Riggi was indicted on state and federal extortion and labor charges, pleading guilty in 1992 and sentenced to 12 years in prison at Butner in North Carolina. While in jail, Riggi appointed a ruling panel to take control of the DeCavalcante crime family until his release, but the acting boss of the panel, Gaetano "Corky" Vastola, was arrested and jailed as well.

John D'Amato was then appointed as acting boss. D'Amato's reign was short, as it soon became clear that he had been recruited by the Gambino crime family and had been conspiring to murder Vastola. Later in 1991, D'Amato got into an argument with his girlfriend, who was also involved with Anthony Rotondo. She told Rotondo that when she and D'Amato were out at clubs during the evenings, D'Amato would be swinging and have sex with other men.

Rotondo reportedly became quite upset that someone within the family was taking part in homosexual acts and shared his suspicions with Giacomo Amari, the reputed underboss, and Stefano Vitabile, the powerful consigliere. They decided to have D'Amato murdered, either because of his sexuality or the belief he had been installed by the Gambino crime family, after informing the incarcerated Riggi. They obtained the other captains' approval of D'Amato's murder, but without informing them he had already been killed.

In January 1992, D'Amato was reported missing; his body has never been found. Vincent Palermo, Anthony Capo and Anthony Rotondo would later testify about this murder against their former associates.

== Murder of Fred Weiss ==
Riggi was scheduled to be released from prison in 2004. Before his release date arrived, however, Riggi was sentenced in September 2003 to an additional 10 years in prison after pleading guilty to ordering the 1989 murder of Fred Weiss, a former journalist for the Staten Island Advance and real-estate developer involved with a mob conspiracy to illegally dump dangerous medical waste.

Riggi allegedly arranged for Weiss' murder as a favor for Gotti. Weiss and two mob partners had purchased the property where they dumped dangerous medical waste. When local authorities uncovered the scheme, Gotti, concerned that Weiss might become a government witness in exchange for leniency, requested that the DeCavalcante crime family murder him.

On September 11, 1989, Palermo and Capo, accompanied by twelve other DeCavalcante associates, drove to the New York condominium of Weiss' girlfriend and shot Weiss as he was getting into his car. Both of them would become "made men" as a result. In 2006, Philip Abramo, Giuseppe Schifilliti and Stefano Vitabile were sentenced to life imprisonment for their involvement in the murder.

It was thought that Riggi still ran the family from prison despite being very sick. Riggi was released from the Federal Medical Center, Devens on November 27, 2012.

== Death ==
After his release, Riggi lived in a small house in Edison, New Jersey, with his nurse/doctor. He died there on August 3, 2015, at the age of 90.
