= Philip Abramo =

American caporegime (born 1945)

- Born: July 22, 1945 (age 81); New York City, New York, U.S.
- Other names: "The King of Wall Street" "Lou Metzer"
- Occupation: Mobster
- Status: Released on January 21, 2018
- Allegiance: DeCavalcante crime family
- Convictions: Possession of stolen property (1971); Conspiracy to distribute heroin (1973); Murder, racketeering, loansharking (2003)
- Penalty: Seven years' imprisonment (1973); Life imprisonment (2006)

Philip Abramo (born July 22, 1945), also known as "The King of Wall Street" and "Lou Metzer", is a caporegime in the New Jersey DeCavalcante crime family who was allegedly involved in security fraud and murder. He is the capo of the DeCavalcante family's crew in Miami, Florida, United States.

== Early years ==
Born in New York, Abramo graduated from Cardinal Hayes High School in the Bronx. One of the few Cosa Nostra mobsters to attend college, he graduated from Pace University with a degree in accounting. In adulthood, he lived in Bowery, Manhattan.

In 1969, he was seized for stealing metals at John F. Kennedy Airport. In 1971, he was convicted of possessing stolen property. In 1973, he was convicted of conspiracy to distribute heroin and sentenced to seven years in federal prison.

== White collar crime ==
At some point, Abramo joined the DeCavalcante family and eventually became a made man, or full member, of the family. He became involved in extortion, loansharking, and microcap stock fraud schemes. Abramo was the hidden control person behind Sovereign, a prominent microcap stock company and its sister trading firm, Falcon Trading. He also controlled two penny stock firms, Toluca Pacific Securities and Greenway Capital. He allegedly controlled other small-cap stock dealers through brokers and traders owing allegiance to him.

== Murder ==
In addition to white collar crime, Abramo also allegedly committed murder. In 1989, he and other DeCavalcante family members allegedly murdered Frederick Weiss, a recycling executive and former city editor of the Staten Island Advance newspapers. The murder was a favor to Gambino crime family boss John Gotti, who feared that Weiss was cooperating with the Federal Bureau of Investigation (FBI) on a waste company investigation. In 1992, Abramo allegedly participated in the killing of DeCavalcante boss John D'Amato, suspected of homosexual acts.

As Abramo's status rose in the DeCavalcante family, he frequently served as a liaison between the DeCavalcantes and the five crime families of New York. The FBI identified him as a frequent visitor to Gotti prior to his imprisonment in 1992. Abramo is also the brother-in-law of Alan Longo, a member of the Genovese crime family.

== Conviction and prison ==
In 1996, Abramo was indicted in New Jersey for allegedly swindling 300 people nationwide out of $1 million by selling them fraudulent lines of credit. In October 2000, he was indicted on charges of racketeering, conspiracy to murder, and securities fraud. During his trial, he made the following statement:

I have done many, many things in my life that I am ashamed of, but I have never, ever murdered another human being nor have I ever asked or ordered anyone to murder another human being.

On July 4, 2003, Abramo was convicted of five murders, including those of D'Amato and Weiss, as well as racketeering and loan sharking charges. In 2006, he was sentenced to life in prison. In September 2008, a federal appeals court reversed his racketeering conviction and ordered a new trial. According to the Federal Bureau of Prisons, Abramo was released on January 21, 2018.
