= List of solved missing person cases (2010s) =

This is a list of solved missing person cases in the 2010s.

== 2010 ==
Date	Person(s)	Age	Country of disappearance	Circumstances	Outcome	Time spent missing or unconfirmed
2010	Isabella Ruth Miller-Jenkins	7	United States / Nicaragua	Isabella's non-custodial mother, Lisa Miller, abducted her and took her to Nicaragua in 2010. Lisa returned to the United States in early 2021 and turned herself in. Eighteen-year-old Isabella filed an affidavit in Nicaragua, stating that she was happy and wished to stay there until she was ready to return to the United States.	Found alive	11 years
2010	Joseph McStay	40	United States	The McStay family abruptly disappeared from their Fallbrook, California, home under suspicious circumstances on February 4, 2010. Their bodies were found by a biker in the desert near Victorville, California, on November 13, 2013. Almost a year later, on November 7, 2014, police arrested Charles "Chase" Merritt, Joseph McStay's business partner, and charged him with the murders.	Murdered	3 years 9 months
2010	Summer McStay	43	United States	The McStay family abruptly disappeared from their Fallbrook, California, home under suspicious circumstances on February 4, 2010. Their bodies were found by a biker in the desert near Victorville, California, on November 13, 2013. Almost a year later, on November 7, 2014, police arrested Charles "Chase" Merritt, Joseph McStay's business partner, and charged him with the murders.	Murdered	3 years 9 months
2010	Gianni McStay	4	United States	The McStay family abruptly disappeared from their Fallbrook, California, home under suspicious circumstances on February 4, 2010. Their bodies were found by a biker in the desert near Victorville, California, on November 13, 2013. Almost a year later, on November 7, 2014, police arrested Charles "Chase" Merritt, Joseph McStay's business partner, and charged him with the murders.	Murdered	3 years 9 months
2010	Joseph McStay Jr.	3	United States	The McStay family abruptly disappeared from their Fallbrook, California, home under suspicious circumstances on February 4, 2010. Their bodies were found by a biker in the desert near Victorville, California, on November 13, 2013. Almost a year later, on November 7, 2014, police arrested Charles "Chase" Merritt, Joseph McStay's business partner, and charged him with the murders.	Murdered	3 years 9 months
2010	Faiza Ashraf	26	Norway	Faiza Ashraf was a Pakistani-Norwegian woman who disappeared in at Haslum in Bærum on February 3, 2010, after being kidnapped. After February 10, 2010, Ashraf's body was found in Asker after the police were told the location of it.	Murdered	7 days
2010	Mackenzie Cowell	17	United States	Mackenzie Cowell was a high school student who went missing after last being seen leaving the beauty school she attended in Wenatchee, Washington, on February 9, 2010. She had told classmates she would be back in 15 minutes. Her body was found four days later on a river bank. A beauty school classmate was charged in her death and pleaded guilty to manslaughter.	Murdered	4 days
2010	Andrew Koenig	41	Canada	Andrew Koenig was an American actor, and the son of Walter Koenig, who went missing after last being seen in Vancouver, British Columbia on February 14, 2010, and using his cellphone on February 16. On February 25, 2010, a group of 11 of his friends and family members found his body hanging from a tree in Stanley Park in downtown Vancouver through an act of suicide.	Suicide by hanging	11 days
2010	Ilenia Vecchiato	28	Italy	28-year-old Ilenia Vecchiato, a part-time beautician based in Bologna who offered sexual services, was reported missing by her parents on March 10, 2010. Upon his arrest, Ramon Berloso confessed to murdering Vecchiato. After picking up Vecchiato, Berloso drove her to a villa owned by an elderly couple he had worked for, offering to have sex there. However, upon reaching the villa, Berloso instead hit Vecchiato on the head with an iron bar before shooting her in the head with a crossbow bolt. Berloso then stole €10,000 from Vecchiato, as well as her mobile phone and credit card, before burying her body on a riverbank near Tapogliano. Berloso also killed 24-year-old Diana Alexiu with the same weapon before placing her body in the same location. While incarcerated, Berloso fatally wounded himself on August 5, 2010; he died 15 days later.	Murdered	4 months
2010	Paulette Gebara Farah	4	Mexico	In the early morning of 22 March 2010, Paulette Gebara Farah, a four-year-old Mexican girl with disabilities, disappeared from her bedroom in her family's apartment, located in a private building in the upscale residential area of Interlomas, in Huixquilucan, State of Mexico. Her family, of wealthy background, launched a massive search campaign through various media outlets. Nine days later, a smell of putrefaction began emanating from her room, and in the early morning of 31 March, her body was discovered wrapped in her bedsheets and wedged between the mattress and the foot of the bed. In that place: her mother had given interviews, experts from various agencies and search dogs had entered, and even Amanda de la Rosa, a friend of Paulette's mother, had slept there without noticing the body. Despite widespread suspicion surrounding her parents' involvement, police officially ruled it an accident.	Died of asphyxia	9 days
2010	Khalid Khawaja	58–59	Pakistan	Pakistan Air Force and Inter-Services Intelligence officer who was kidnapped by the Asian Tigers militant group on March 30, 2010, while making a documentary on Colonel Imam. His body was later found in Mir Ali.	Murdered	1 month
2010	Shelley Armitage	31	United Kingdom	Bradford sex worker Shelley Armitage was last seen in Rebecca Street in the city centre on April 26, 2010. Two days later she was reported missing to police. On June 2, police announced that some of her remains had been found in the River Aire. She had been murdered by serial killer Stephen Griffiths.	Murdered	37 days
2010	Shannan Gilbert	24	United States	Gilbert, a 24-year-old escort, was last seen alive in the early hours of May 1, 2010 in Suffolk County, New York. Her body was discovered in marshland in December 2011. Although strong physical and circumstantial evidence suggsts Gilbert had been murdered, her cause of death was listed as undetermined.	Undetermined	19 months
2010	Zoe Nelson	17	United Kingdom	Nelson was a Scottish college student who disappeared while in the company of her boyfriend, Robert Bayne, on May 22, 2010. The next day, her burned remains were found in a wooded area outside Wishaw. Bayne was later convicted and sentenced to life imprisonment.	Murdered	1 day
2010	Suzanne Pilley	38	United Kingdom	Suzanne Pilley was a woman who disappeared on May 4, 2010, in Scotland. On June 23, 2010, David Gilroy, her former boyfriend, was detained by Lothian and Borders Police under Section 14 of the Criminal Procedure (Scotland) Act 1995 in connection with her disappearance. Later that day, he was arrested and charged with her murder, and on March 15, 2012, he was found guilty, revealing that she had been murdered.	Murdered	Not found
2010	Paula Leclair	64	Canada	Ottawa woman Paula Leclair went missing on May 20, 2010. She was murdered by serial killer Camille Cléroux. Her buried body was found in June 2011.	Murdered	1 year
2010	Suzanne Blamires	36	United Kingdom	Bradford sex worker Suzanne Blamires disappeared on May 21, 2010. Three days later, the police arrested a man after CCTV footage showing him murdering Blamires in his block of flats was seen by the caretaker. The following day, human remains were found by a member of the public in the River Aire in Shipley, West Yorkshire, and they were confirmed as being Blamires's on May 28. She had been murdered by serial killer Stephen Griffiths.	Murdered	1 week
2010	Diego Fernández de Cevallos	69	Mexico	Mexican politician and member of the National Action Party who was abducted on his property in Pedro Escobedo on May 14, 2010. His kidnappers demanded $100 million for his release, but later decreased the amount, and De Cevallos was released on December 25, 2010.	Found alive	7 months
2010	Megan Amelia Waterman	22	United States	A victim of the Gilgo Beach serial killings, Waterman was last seen alive on June 6, 2010. Her body was discovered in December 2010.	Murdered	5 months
2010	Cherry Walker	39	United States	Cherry Walker, the 39-year-old mentally challenged babysitter of Kimberly Cargill's son, was murdered by Cargill on June 18, 2010. Earlier that day, Walker had been served with a subpoena to testify at a custody hearing for Cargill's son, and Cargill feared that she would lose custody if Walker showed up to testify. Walker's body was discovered the day after her murder and was identified four days later. Cargill was later convicted of capital murder and sentenced to death by lethal injection.	Murdered	1 day
2010	Lyle McCann	78	Canada	The McCann couple, from St. Albert, Alberta, Canada, went missing after going on a road trip on July 3, 2010. Their bodies were never found. In January 2017, Travis Vader was sentenced to life imprisonment for their manslaughter.	Murdered	Not found
2010	Marie McCann	77	Canada	The McCann couple, from St. Albert, Alberta, Canada, went missing after going on a road trip on July 3, 2010. Their bodies were never found. In January 2017, Travis Vader was sentenced to life imprisonment for their manslaughter.	Murdered	Not found
2010	Tiara Pool	21	United States	The 21-year-old wife of a Navy sailor, was murdered on July 7, 2010 by David Kelsey Sparre with whom she first met through Craigslist. After having sex with Pool, Sparre killed Pool by inflicting an estimated 89 knife wounds on her body, which was found four days later.	Murdered	5 days
2010	Eliza Samudio	25	Brazil	A Brazilian model and actress murdered by goalkeeper Bruno Fernandes. She is believed to have been murdered by strangulation on or about 10 June and subsequently dismembered and buried beneath a layer of concrete.	Murdered	1 month
2010	Lorenzen Wright	34	United States	An American professional basketball player, who disappeared on July 19, 2010, and was found dead on July 28 in Memphis, Tennessee, in a wooded area. The case was ruled a homicide. On November 9, 2017, Lorenzen Wright's ex-wife, Sherra Wright Robinson, was arrested in connection with the Lorenzen Wright murder, days after Billy R. Turner, a landscaper, was indicted on first-degree murder charges.	Murdered	9 days
2010	Sarah Scazzi	15	Italy	On 26 August 2010, a teenage girl went missing in Avetrana, Italy. Her cousin, aunt and uncle were convicted of killing her.	Murdered	2 months
2010	Amber Tuccaro	20	Canada	Tuccaro was a Canadian First Nations woman who vanished from Fort McMurray while travelling towards Edmonton for a vacation. Her remains were found on September 1, 2012, but her killer has not been apprehended.	Murdered	2 years
2010	Natasha Lynn Montgomery	23	United States	A victim of serial killer Cody Legebokoff. Montgomery was a 23-year-old mother of two who disappeared on or about September 1, 2010. Although her body has never been found, DNA evidence conclusively links Legebokoff to her disappearance.	Murdered	Not found
2010	Amber Lynn Costello	27	United States	A further victim of the Gilgo Beach serial killings. Costello was last seen alive on September 2, 2010—ostensibly while traveling to meet a client who had offered her $2,500 for sexual services. Her body was discovered on found on December 13, 2010.	Murdered	3 months
2010	Cynthia Frances Maas	35	Canada	35-year-old Cynthia Frances Maas was last seen alive on September 10, 2010. Her body was found in a Prince George park the following month. Maas died of blunt force trauma to the head and penetrating wounds. She had a hole in her shoulder blade, a broken jaw and cheekbone, and injuries to her neck consistent with someone stomping on it. In September 2014, serial killer Cody Legebokoff was convicted of Maas's murder, as well as those of two other women and a teenage girl.	Murdered	1 month
2010	Zahra Baker	10	United States	Baker was an Australian schoolgirl who was killed by her American stepmother in Hickory, North Carolina, on September 24, 2010. Her body was later dismembered and the remains scattered, with Baker's skull found in April 2012, and identified in February 2013.	Murdered	2 years
2010	Linda Norgrove	35–36	Afghanistan	Norgrove was a Scottish aid worker who was kidnapped by Taliban militants in Afghanistan's Kunar Province on September 26, 2010. She was moved to a mountain hideout, where she remained for a little over a week before being located. However, she died from injuries sustained during the rescue attempt.	Died from injuries from rescue attempt	10 days
2010	Yara Gambirasio	13	Italy	Gambirasio disappeared after visiting the sports centre in Brembate di Sopra on November 24, 2010. Her body, showing a wound to the head and many small cuts, was found on February 26, 2011. DNA found on her body led to the arrest and conviction of bricklayer Massimo Bossetti, who was sentenced to life imprisonment for her murder.	Murdered	4 months
2010	James Nolan	46	Republic of Ireland	Irish criminal who was convicted of rape and false imprisonment. He was last seen at the Wellmount Clinic in Finglas, on November 30, 2010, where he collected methadone; sections of his body were found at Dollymount Strand in February 2011. Nolan's brother, Thomas, later confessed in his suicide note that he had killed his brother.	Murdered	70 days
2010	Joanna Yeates	25	United Kingdom	A landscape architect from Hampshire, England, who disappeared on December 17, 2010, in Bristol. Her body was discovered on December 25, 2010, in Failand, North Somerset.	Murdered	8 days
2010	Hailey Dunn	13	United States	Hailey Dunn was an American teenage girl who went missing from her hometown of Colorado City, Texas on December 27, 2010. Her remains were found in March 2013.	Murdered	3 years 3 months

=== 2011 ===
Date	Person(s)	Age	Country of disappearance	Circumstances	Outcome	Time spent missing or unconfirmed
2011	Bethany Decker	21	United States	Decker, a student at George Mason University, who lived in the nearby Washington, D.C., suburb of Ashburn, Virginia, who was several months pregnant, was last accounted for on January 29 when she called the restaurant where she worked to confirm her schedule for the next week. Her husband and a boyfriend, Ronald Roldan, both claimed to have seen her that day, as well. Three weeks later, after Facebook messages from her to friends that seemed to them to have been written by someone else, she was reported missing. Roldan was considered a person of interest in the case, and after serving time for an assault in North Carolina was arrested and charged in Decker's abduction in 2020. In November 2022 he pleaded guilty to second-degree murder; Decker's body has never been found.	Murdered	Not found
2011	Laila Khan	33	India	Khan was a Bollywood actress best known for her role in Wafa: A Deadly Love Story, and being allegedly married to a member of the banned Islamist organization Harkat-ul-Jihad al-Islami. She disappeared together with several family members on January 30, 2011. A year later, they were all found shot to death at a bungalow in Maharashtra.	Murdered	More than 1 year
2011	Nubia Barahona	10	United States	Barahona was an American girl who, along with her twin brother Victor, was physically abused by her adoptive father and birth mother in West Palm Beach, Florida, leading to her death on February 11, 2011. Her body was later found in her adoptive father's truck, with both him and her mother being put on trial for the murder.	Murdered	3 days
2011	Muzafar Bhutto	41	Pakistan	A Sindhi nationalist politician, who went missing on February 24, 2011, and was found dead on May 22, 2012, at a roadside near Hatri bypass.	Murdered	1 Year 3 months
2011	Seath Jackson	15	United States	Jackson was shot to death in Summerfield, Florida before his body was burned and the ashes disposed of in a rock quarry.	Murdered	Not found
2011	Maddy Scott	20	Vanderhoof, Canada	Scott went missing after a birthday party at Hogsback Lake 25 miles (40 km) southeast of Vanderhoof, British Columbia on May 28, 2011. Scott's remains were found on May 29, 2023, at a rural property on the east side of Vanderhoof, around 80 kilometres west of Prince George.	Died (unknown cause)	12 years
2011	Sian O'Callaghan	22	United Kingdom	O'Callaghan was last seen on CCTV leaving the Suju nightclub in Swindon alone at 2:52 am on March 19, 2011, intending to walk the half-mile distance to her home. Her boyfriend sent a text message to her at 3:24, at which time, it was later discovered, O'Callaghan's phone was in the Savernake Forest 12 miles away. On March 24, an arrested suspect led police to her body in a shallow grave near Uffington, Oxfordshire, and the suspect, Christopher Halliwell, was later convicted for her murder.	Murdered	5 days
2011	Holly Bobo	20	United States	Bobo disappeared from her home in Darden, Tennessee, on April 13, 2011. Her remains were found in September 2014 in northern Decatur County, Tennessee, and her death was ruled a homicide.	Murdered	3 years 5 months
2011	Michelle Le	26	United States	Michelle Le was a 26-year-old nursing student who disappeared in Hayward, California, on May 27, 2011. Her remains were discovered in a remote canyon area on September 17, 2011, and were identified as hers two days later. Giselle Diwag Esteban, a former friend of Le's, was arrested and charged with her murder. Esteban pled not guilty, though was convicted of first-degree murder and sentenced to 25 years to life in prison.	Murdered	3 months
2011	William Scott Currier	49	United States	Currier and Simonne were murdered by serial killer Israel Keyes on the evening of June 8, 2011. Both were murdered in an abandoned Vermont farmhouse. Their remains were never recovered, although Keyes confessed to the murders following his arrest.	Murdered	Not found
2011	Lorraine Simonne	55	United States	Currier and Simonne were murdered by serial killer Israel Keyes on the evening of June 8, 2011. Both were murdered in an abandoned Vermont farmhouse. Their remains were never recovered, although Keyes confessed to the murders following his arrest.	Murdered	Not found
2011	Olivier David Och	31	Pakistan	Swiss tourist couple who were kidnapped by Tehrik-i-Taliban Pakistan gunmen in Pakistan's Loralai District, while travelling by car to Iran. The pair escaped captivity in March 2012, safely returning to their native country afterwards.	Found alive	8 months
2011	Daniela Widmer	28	Pakistan	Swiss tourist couple who were kidnapped by Tehrik-i-Taliban Pakistan gunmen in Pakistan's Loralai District, while travelling by car to Iran. The pair escaped captivity in March 2012, safely returning to their native country afterwards.	Found alive	8 months
2011	Celine Ng Swee Peng	36	Singapore	A Singaporean property agent who disappeared on the date of her 36th birthday. Ng's 36-year-old flatmate Ang Soo Hoon reported her missing two days after Ng's disappearance, stating that Ng wanted to go overseas during a drinks session at her West Coast condominium on the early morning itself, and Ang last saw Ng at 4am before she went to bed, and Ng was missing from her home by the time Ang woke up at 10am. The police questioned Ng's family and friends, who all publicized her case to seek information of her whereabouts, which remained a mystery for more than a month. 41 days after Ng's disappearance, the police found a skeleton left in the forest along Clementi Road, and the skeletal remains were confirmed to be Ng's after some DNA tests. Being the last person to see Ng alive, Ang was arrested as a suspect and charged with murder after Ang confessed that she strangled Ng after she was hurled a derogative remark by Ng over Ang's failed attempt to help Ng commit suicide. Originally charged with murder, Ang later pleaded guilty to one charge of manslaughter, one charge of misappropriating Ng's money and one charge of providing false information to the police. She was sentenced to 12.5 years' imprisonment in July 2015.	Murdered	41 days
2011	Jenna Lepomäki	18	Spain	Finnish woman who was killed in Fuengirola, Spain in June 2011, by two men who had approached her to become a drug courier. Her mummified body was found on October 6, and the two men were later convicted and sentenced to life imprisonment.	Murdered	5 months
2011	Alexandre Junca	11	France	The 11-year-old boy was murdered in Pau, Pyrénées-Atlantiques for his mobile phone and the parts of his dismembered body were discovered in the following months.	Murdered	3 weeks
2011	Moussa Ibrahim	36	Libya	A Libyan political figure who disappeared in August 2011. In October 2014, he was discovered in Egypt, and later deported back to Libya.	Found alive	3 years 2 months
2011	Warren Weinstein	70	Pakistan	American contractor who was kidnapped by al-Qaeda militants in Pakistan on August 13, 2011. He was kept in detention for four years, until he was accidentally killed by a drone strike on January 15, 2015, in Waziristan.	Died (drone strike)	4 years
2011	Jessica Buchanan	32	Somalia	Aid workers, of American and Danish nationality, respectively, who were kidnapped by pirates in Galkayo, Somalia in October 2011. Both hostages were rescued in an operation a few months later, and safely returned to their home countries.	Found alive	3 months
2011	Poul Hagen Thisted	60	Somalia	Aid workers, of American and Danish nationality, respectively, who were kidnapped by pirates in Galkayo, Somalia in October 2011. Both hostages were rescued in an operation a few months later, and safely returned to their home countries.	Found alive	3 months
2011	José Bretón Ortiz	2	Spain	The Ortizes were Spanish siblings who were drugged and murdered by their father, José Bretón Gómez, and whose bodies he burned in a pyre on October 8, 2011. After the remaining bones were identified as human, Bretón Gómez was arrested, convicted and sentenced to 40 years' imprisonment for their murders, later reduced to 25 on appeal.	Murdered	1 day
2011	Ruth Bretón Ortiz	6	Spain	The Ortizes were Spanish siblings who were drugged and murdered by their father, José Bretón Gómez, and whose bodies he burned in a pyre on October 8, 2011. After the remaining bones were identified as human, Bretón Gómez was arrested, convicted and sentenced to 40 years' imprisonment for their murders, later reduced to 25 on appeal.	Murdered	1 day
2011	Nauman Habib	32	Pakistan	Habib was a Pakistani cricketer who was found murdered in the Peshawar suburb of Hayatabad on October 11, 2011, two days after his disappearance.	Murdered	2 days
2011	Beatrice Weston	19	United States	The 19-year-old niece of one of the perpetrators of the Philadelphia basement kidnappings. Weston had been reported missing in 2009; she was discovered— malnourished and suffering from multiple wounds—on October 17, 2011.	Found alive	2 years
2011	Erica Parsons	13	United States	Parsons was last seen in North Carolina by persons outside her family on November 17, 2011. In 2016, her remains were found in a shallow grave near her adoptive grandmother's house in an adjacent portion of South Carolina. Her own adoptive parents, who allegedly abused her, were later convicted for her murder.	Murdered	4 years 10 months
2011	Wilson Ramos	24	Venezuela	Known as "The Buffalo", Ramos is a Venezuelan professional baseball catcher who has played in several prominent American teams. While visiting his mother's home in Valencia on November 9, 2011, Ramos was abducted by several gunmen who held him captive in the mountain regions near Montalbán. He was later rescued in a police operation, and eight men were arrested for the kidnapping.	Found alive	More than 2 days
2011	Stephen Corrigan	48	Ireland	An Irish man who disappeared on November 22, 2011. On April 9, 2020, partial remains of his skeleton were found in Rathmines, Dublin.	Died (unknown cause)	9 years
2011	Stephen McGown	Unknown	Mali	Tourists who were kidnapped by AQIM militants from a restaurant in Timbuktu, Mali. Rijke, a Dutch national, was rescued by French special forces in 2015, while McGown and Gustafsson were released as part of undisclosed negotiations between their respective countries.	Found alive	5 years
2011	Johan Gustafsson	Unknown	Mali	Tourists who were kidnapped by AQIM militants from a restaurant in Timbuktu, Mali. Rijke, a Dutch national, was rescued by French special forces in 2015, while McGown and Gustafsson were released as part of undisclosed negotiations between their respective countries.	Found alive	5 years
2011	Sjaak Rijke	Unknown	Mali	Tourists who were kidnapped by AQIM militants from a restaurant in Timbuktu, Mali. Rijke, a Dutch national, was rescued by French special forces in 2015, while McGown and Gustafsson were released as part of undisclosed negotiations between their respective countries.	Found alive	3 years

=== 2012 ===
Date	Person(s)	Age	Country of disappearance	Circumstances	Outcome	Time spent missing or unconfirmed
2012	Giselly Helena da Silva	31	Brazil	A victim of the Garanhuns cannibals. Da Silva, age 31, was murdered in February 2012. Her body was discovered in April 2012.	Murdered	2 months
2012	Trayvon Martin	17	United States	High school student who was shot and killed in an altercation with neighborhood watch coordinator George Zimmerman on February 26, 2012. As his body was not identified until two days after his death, his mother filed a missing persons report, after which police brought photographs of her son to conclusively identify him. Zimmerman was acquitted at trial on murder charges after pleading self-defense.	Murdered	2 days
2012	Gemma McCluskie	29	United Kingdom	A British television actress who disappeared from her home in East London on March 1, 2012. Her dismembered body was discovered on March 6, 2012, in the Regent's Canal. Her brother, Tony McCluskie, was charged and found guilty of her murder.	Murdered	5 days
2012	Nurul Nadirah Abdullah	4	Malaysia	A four-year-old Malaysian child abducted while walking to a grocery shop in Bandar Seri Alam, Masai. Abdullah - known as "Dirang" - was raped and murdered by at least one individual, Muidin Maidin. Her charred body was found one week after her abduction. Her murderer remains on death row.	Murdered	1 week
2012	Allison Baden-Clay	43	Australia	Baden-Clay was an Australian woman who disappeared on April 20, 2012; her body was discovered on April 30, 2012, after she was reported missing by her husband, who was found guilty of murdering her.	Murdered	10 days
2012	Gavin Smith	57	United States	An executive with 20th Century Fox who was last seen leaving a friend's house in Oak Park, California, on May 1, 2012. In 2014, he was declared legally dead from the night of his disappearance. His body was found in a shallow grave later that year by hikers in a rural area near Angeles National Forest. In early 2015, police arrested John Lenzie Creech, the husband of one of Smith's extramarital acquaintances, and charged him with Smith's murder. Creech, who is currently serving an eight-year sentence on an unrelated drug dealing conviction, admitted killing Smith, but claimed he did so in self-defense.	Murdered	2 years
2012	Jun Lin	33	Canada	A university student tortured, murdered and dismembered in Montreal by Luka Magnotta, who subsequently mailed sections of Lin's appendages to Canadian political parties and two elementary schools. Magnotta ultimately fled Canada after also uploading a video of Lin's murder and dismemberment to a Canadian shock site. He was arrested in a Berlin internet café in June 2012.	Murdered	20 days
2012	Claire Holland	32	United Kingdom	On June 6, 2012, 32-year-old Holland disappeared after leaving the Seamus O'Donnell's pub in Bristol, England. It was later discovered that she was murdered by her former partner, Darren Osment. Osment was convicted of Holland's murder in December 2023 after he had made numerous confessions to the murder to multiple people including an undercover police officer. Holland's body was never found.	Murdered	Not found
2012	Arkadiusz Sojka	32	Poland	Arkadiusz Sojka was a football player striker from Poland who went missing in June 2012 from Przesieka, and was found dead in October 2012.	Died (unknown cause)	3 months
2012	Jeroen Oerlemans	42	Syria	Oerlemans was a Dutch photographer and war correspondent who was kidnapped in Syria in July 2012, together with British journalist John Cantlie. Both were freed a week later by the Free Syrian Army. Oerlemans continued to work in the Near East and Afghanistan until his death in 2016, when he was killed by an ISIL sniper in Sirte, Libya.	Found alive	1 week
2012	Laura Babcock	23	Canada	A 23-year-old Toronto woman murdered in early July 2012 by Dellen Millard and Mark Smich. Her remains were incinerated, and have never been recovered. Babcock's murderers were sentenced to life imprisonment in 2017.	Murdered	Not found
2012	Skylar Neese	16	United States	Neese was an American girl who disappeared from her home in Star City, West Virginia, around midnight on July 6, 2012. Her remains were found on January 16, 2013, in Greene County, Pennsylvania. She was murdered by her two best friends.	Murdered	6 months
2012	Ramona Moore	35	United States	Moore disappeared from her apartment in the Bronx, and her body was found three years later in South Blooming Grove. Her building superintendent, Nasean Bonie, a long-time suspect in the case, was later convicted of manslaughter in the case and sentenced to 25 years' imprisonment.	Murdered	3 years
2012	Tia Sharp	12	United Kingdom	Sharp was a British girl who went missing on August 3, 2012. Her body was found seven days later in her grandmother's loft. Her grandmother's partner, who Tia regarded as her grandfather, was convicted of Tia's murder.	Murdered	7 days
2012	Hüseyin Aygün	42	Turkey	Turkish lawyer and politician who was kidnapped by PKK militants on August 12, 2012, together with a reporter and his aide. Aygün was released unharmed two days later, and his comments on the amiable treatment from his kidnappers caused controversy within his party.	Found alive	2 days
2012	Elaine O'Hara	36	Ireland	O'Hara was an Irish childcare worker who was last seen on August 22, 2012, in Shanganagh, Dublin by a jogger. Her body was found on August 21, 2013. On March 27, 2015, Graham Dwyer, with whom she had participated in BDSM sessions, was convicted and sentenced to a term of life imprisonment.	Murdered	1 year
2012	Gillian Meagher	29	Australia	A 29-year-old Irish native who was raped and murdered while walking home from a pub in Brunswick, an inner suburb of Melbourne, Victoria. Meagher's body was discovered near Gisborne South six days after her disappearance.	Murdered	6 days
2012	April Jones	5	United Kingdom	Jones was a five-year-old Welsh girl from Machynlleth, Powys, who disappeared after she was sighted willingly getting into a vehicle near her home on October 1, 2012. On May 30, 2013, Mark Bridger was convicted of Jones's abduction and murder, after forensic evidence was found in his car and home. Her body has never been found.	Murdered	7 months
2012	Janusz Wojcieszak	58–59	Poland	Janusz Wojcieszak was a Polish philosopher and philologist and history specialist who disappeared from Warsaw, Poland on October 8, 2012, and was found dead nine days later.	Suicide	9 days
2012	James Foley	38	Syria	Foley was an American journalist and video reporter, known for predominantly writing in military newspapers centering around events related to the Middle East. While working as a freelance correspondent in northwestern Syria, he was abducted by ISIL militants on November 22, 2012. He was kept as a hostage until August 2014, when he was beheaded on video by militants in response to the intervention in Iraq.	Murdered	2 years
2012	Joshua Boyle	Unknown	Afghanistan	Boyle and Coleman are a Canadian-American couple who were kidnapped on October 8, 2012, in Afghanistan, while on a trip through Central and South Asia. They were held in captivity by militants until 2017, when they were rescued by security forces in Pakistan.	Found alive	5 years
2012	Caitlan Coleman	Unknown	Afghanistan	Boyle and Coleman are a Canadian-American couple who were kidnapped on October 8, 2012, in Afghanistan, while on a trip through Central and South Asia. They were held in captivity by militants until 2017, when they were rescued by security forces in Pakistan.	Found alive	5 years
2012	Tokbergen Abiyev	Unknown	Kazakhstan	A Kazakh journalist who went missing on December 20, 2012, just hours after he announced to the Kazakh media that he had a sensational news report about to be published. Abiyev reappeared on January 4, 2013.	Found alive	2 weeks

=== 2013 ===
Date	Person(s)	Age	Country of disappearance	Circumstances	Outcome	Time spent missing or unconfirmed
2013	In Amenas crisis hostages	Various	Algeria	The In Amenas hostage crisis, lasting from January 16 to 19, 2013, was an attack by Al-Mourabitoun jihadists directed at the Tigantourine gas facility in In Amenas, Algeria. During the process, the militants killed at least 37 foreign tourists and one security guard, and kept hundreds of others in captivity until the eventually rescue operation by Algerian security forces.	39+ killed, 792+ found alive	3 days
2013	Ethan Gilman	5	United States	Gilman was kidnapped by Jimmy Lee Dykes, a retired Vietnam veteran, from his schoolbus, after killing the vehicle's driver. He then kept Gilman as his hostage in his bunker in Midland City, Alabama, until a week later, when police raided the facility, killing Dykes and rescuing Gilman.	Found alive	1 week
2013	Elisa Lam	21	United States	Lam was a Canadian university student who disappeared from the Cecil Hotel in Los Angeles on January 31, 2013. Hotel elevator surveillance video taken on the day of her disappearance showed Lam repeatedly entering and exiting the (apparently malfunctioning) elevator while intermittently talking outside the elevator and appearing to hide within the elevator. Maintenance workers found her body in a water tank atop the hotel on February 19, 2013, while responding to guest complaints about low water pressure. Her death was ruled accidental but questions still remained concerning why and how she entered the water tank.	Drowned	3 weeks
2013	David Haines	43	Syria	Haines was a British-Canadian aid worker providing humanitarian aid in various conflicts, most notably for people from former Yugoslavia, the African countries and the Middle East. In March 2013, he was kidnapped by an unidentified armed group in Atme, Syria, along with Italian aid worker Federico Motka. His status as a hostage was confirmed when he surfaced in the video showing the beheading of Steven Sotloff, prompting an attempted rescue. The attempt was unsuccessful, and Haines was executed a few months later.	Murdered	19 months
2013	Kevin Lee	48	United Kingdom	Peterborough man Kevin Lee was reported missing after his car was found burned out near a farm in Yaxley, Cambridgeshire. Two days later his body was found in a ditch in Newborough, Cambridgeshire. He had been stabbed in the chest. He had been murdered by female serial killer Joanna Dennehy, whom he was infatuated with.	Murdered	2 days
2013	Glory Chau Wing-ki	63	Hong Kong	Glory Chau Wing-ki and Moon Siu Yuet-yee were an elderly couple murdered in Hong Kong, presumably on March 1, 2013. Their youngest son, Henry Chau Hoi-leung, and his friend, Angus Tse Chun-kei, were indicted for the murder, which they initially denied being involved in. During Chau and Tse's interviews with the police, they admitted that after the murder, they chopped up the parents' dead bodies and cooked the remains with salt to make them look "like barbecue pork." They kept part of the remains in lunch boxes, which they stored in the refrigerator. The gruesome details of the murder sparked a huge amount of media coverage in Hong Kong. On March 20, 2015, High Court deputy judge Michael Stuart-Moore found Chau guilty of double murder while finding his accomplice Tse not guilty on both counts of murder.	Murdered	2 weeks
2013	Moon Siu Yuet-yee	65	Hong Kong		Murdered	2 weeks
2013	Sunil Tripathi	22	United States	Sunil Tripathi was an American student who disappeared from Providence, Rhode Island, on March 16, 2013. Tripathi was later found dead on April 23, 2013 after having died by suicide by drowning.	Suicide by drowning	Over 1 month
2013	Jessica Heeringa	25	United States	Heeringa disappeared from her job at a gas station in Norton Shores, Michigan, on April 26, 2013. Although her remains have not been found, in 2016, Jeffrey Willis, a frequent customer of hers, was charged with her kidnapping and murder due to forensic evidence and eyewitness testimony, while his cousin Kevin Bluhm was charged with accessory after he confessed to helping him bury her body. Willis was found guilty of Heeringa's kidnapping and murder on May 16, 2018. He received a life sentence without parole a month later. On November 27, 2017, Bluhm pleaded no contest to being an accessory for helping Willis dispose of Heeringa's body and was sentenced on January 9, 2018, to time served, plus five years' probation and to wear a GPS tether for at least a year.	Murdered	Not found
2013	Timothy Bosma	32	Canada	A resident of Ancaster, Ontario, murdered by Dellen Millard and Mark Smich. Bosma was lured from his house on the pretext of allowing Millard and Smich to take a Dodge Ram pickup truck he had for sale for a test drive. He was shot in the head and his body incinerated at a location in Waterloo, although his body was never found.	Murdered	Not found
2013	Ingrid Visser	35	Spain	Visser, a Dutch retired volleyball player, and her boyfriend, Lodewijk Severein, disappeared on May 13, 2013, shortly after checking into a hotel in the city of Murcia, Spain. Visser was a member of the Netherlands women's national volleyball team. Their bodies were found in a shallow grave in a lemon grove on May 27. The pair had been abducted, tortured and killed. In November 2016 three men known to the couple were sentenced to 35 years in prison for the murders.	Murdered	2 weeks
2013	Lodewijk Severein	35	Spain	Visser, a Dutch retired volleyball player, and her boyfriend, Lodewijk Severein, disappeared on May 13, 2013, shortly after checking into a hotel in the city of Murcia, Spain. Visser was a member of the Netherlands women's national volleyball team. Their bodies were found in a shallow grave in a lemon grove on May 27. The pair had been abducted, tortured and killed. In November 2016 three men known to the couple were sentenced to 35 years in prison for the murders.	Murdered	2 weeks
2013	Zsolt Erőss	45	Nepal	Hungarian high-altitude mountaineer Zsolt Erőss, who after successfully climbing Kangchenjunga on May 20, 2013, went missing during his descent the following day. Searches were suspended two days later because, according to the expedition's leader and other experienced mountaineers, his survival was impossible. In 2014, his body was seen on the ramp at 8,100 m, and its identity was confirmed as Erőss's.	Died (unknown cause)	1 year
2013	Cullen Finnerty	30	United States	Cullen Finnerty was an American football quarterback who disappeared on May 26, 2013, after going fishing on the Baldwin River in Michigan. Finnerty was found dead two days later in the woods.	Died (Pneumonia)	2 days
2013	Rania Alayed	25	United Kingdom	British mother Alayed was never seen again after June 17, 2013, the same day that she had gone to her brother-in-law's house at the instigation of her husband. The husband, Ahmed Al-Khatib, was convicted of her murder a year later in what was a suspected "honour killing", carried out as Al-Khatib believed she had become too Westernized. Al-Khatib said at his trial that he had become unhappy when his wife started college and started wearing make-up. He confessed to killing her, although her body was not found.	Murdered	Not found
2013	unknown	6	Germany	An unidentified child was abducted during a kindergarten trip on the morning of 3 January 2013. The kidnapping lasted approximately 16 months before the child was recovered alive. Investigators determined the abductor died during the incident that led to the child's escape, concluding the child had acted in self-defense. The case was subsequently closed.	Found alive	16 months
2013	Fariba Ahmadi Kakar	48	Afghanistan	Acting representative of the Communications Committee in Afghanistan's House of the People who was kidnapped by Taliban militants in August 2013, while she was travelling with her children in Gazni. She and her children were later released without harm as part of a prison exchange between the Afghan government and the Taliban.	Found alive	1 month
2013	Robert Hoagland	50	United States	Hoagland was reportedly last seen mowing the lawn of his home on the morning of July 28, 2013. Earlier that day, he was seen on video buying a road map and fuel for his wife's car at a local gas station. His disappearance was discovered after he failed to pick up his wife when she returned from a trip abroad the following day. He apparently relocated to Rock Hill, New York, and lived under the name Richard King, until his death December 5, 2022. Police found documents on him with his real name and confirmed his identity with Newtown police.	Died prior to identity being revealed	9 years, 4 months and 1 week
2013	Hannah Anderson	16	United States	Hannah Marie Anderson, a 16-year-old high school student from Lakeside, California, was abducted on the afternoon of August 3, 2013. Her abductor, 40-year-old James DiMaggio, had murdered Anderson's mother, Christina, and younger brother, Ethan, whose bodies were found in his incinerated home the following day. An Amber alert was issued for Anderson, who was found alive at a campsite in Cascade, Idaho, on August 10 immediately after her abductor—who had fled to this location with her—was killed by police after firing upon officers.	Found alive	7 days
2013	Alexis Murphy	17	United States	Alexis Murphy was a female teenager who went missing on August 3, 2013 in Nelson County, Virginia. The remains of Murphy were found in Lovingston on December 3, 2020.	Murdered	More than 6 years
2013	Steven Sotloff	30	Syria	Sotloff was an American-Israeli journalist, known for covering current events in Egypt, Turkey, Libya, Bahrain and, most notably, Syria. On August 4, 2013, he was kidnapped in Aleppo, Syria with several other people while crossing the border with Turkey. His kidnappers remained unknown until September 2, 2014, when ISIL released a video beheading him.	Murdered	13 months
2013	Brandon Lawson	26	United States	Lawson disappeared in the early hours of August 9, 2013 after he ran out of gas on Highway 277, a few miles south of Bronte, Texas. Lawson's remains were found in February 2022 but were not identified until December 2024.	Died (unknown cause)	11 years
2013	Asunta Basterra	12	Spain	Chinese-born Spanish girl who was repeatedly drugged and ultimately murdered by her adoptive parents, Alfonso Basterra and Rosario Porto, in her hometown of Teo, Spain on September 21, 2013. Her body was found a day later near a country house. Both Basterra and Porto were later convicted and sentenced to 18 years each for the murder.	Murdered	1 day
2013	Ng Yuk Tim	15	Malaysia	Ng was a Malaysian schoolgirl murdered by a 23-year-old acquaintance, Poon Wai Hong, on 21 October 2013. She was reportedly murdered after refusing to engage in sex with Poon, who later concealed her body inside a suitcase. Ng's body was discovered the following day. Poon was originally charged and sentenced to death for murder, before he appealed and had his death sentence reduced to 22 years' jail for a lesser offence of manslaughter.	Murdered	1 day
2013	Nicolasa Quintremán	74	Chile	A Chilean Pehuenche activist after going missing was found deceased following an accidental drowning.	Drowned	1 day
2013	Gerry Largay	66	United States	While solo hiking the Appalachian Trail in Maine, Gerry stepped away from the trail to go to the bathroom and became lost. She survived at least 19 days before succumbing to starvation. Despite one of the largest searches in Maine history, she was not initially found. Her campsite and remains were found over 2 years later approximately 3,000 feet (910 m) from the trail in dense forest cover.	Died (Starvation)	2 years

=== 2014 ===
Date	Person(s)	Age	Country of disappearance	Circumstances	Outcome	Time spent missing or unconfirmed
2014	David Bird	55	United States	Bird, a reporter for The Wall Street Journal, left his Millington, New Jersey, home for a short walk on January 11, 2014, and never returned. His body was found in a nearby river 14 months later. A subsequent investigation determined that the cause of death was accidental drowning.	Drowned	14 months
2014	Fawzia Amin Sido	10	Iraq	Sido was abducted at the age of ten by agents of the Islamic State (ISIS) in 2014 and was confined for a decade and subjected to physical and sexual abuse. Sido was eventually rescued in 2024 and returned to her homeland.	Found alive	10 years
2014	Dmytro Bulatov	36	Ukraine	Civic activist and leader of AutoMaidan, an anti-government political movement. On January 22, 2014, he was kidnapped by a group of armed men, but when it was learned that he had gotten in contact with his friends, he was released eight days later. During his detention, Bulatov alleged that his kidnappers spoke with Russian accents. He had to undergo treatment for his injuries as well, as he had been tortured.	Found alive	8 days
2014	Loretta Saunders	26	Canada	Canadian Inuk student at Saint Mary's University who went missing from Halifax on February 13, 2014. Originally thought to be a missing person, it was determined that she had been killed after her body was found 13 days later. Her roommates were later convicted of her murder.	Murdered	13 days
2014	Dave Walker	59	Cambodia	Walker was a Canadian filmmaker and photojournalist who vanished from his guest house in Cambodia on February 14, 2014. His body was later located near the Gates of Death, but an autopsy determined that he had died months prior from an undetermined cause.	Died (unknown cause)	3 months
2014	Chin Swee Road child death	2	Singapore	A 30-month-old girl, believed to be named Umaisyah, whose charred remains were discovered concealed inside a flat in Chin Swee Road, Tiong Bahru, Singapore, in September 2019. Her parents were later charged with her murder, which is believed to have been caused due to a form of brain trauma.	Murdered	7 years
2014	Kris Kremers	21	Panama	Two Dutch students who disappeared on April 1, 2014, while hiking in Panama. Believing they were on the proper trail, the two women became lost in the backcountry rainforest without supplies. Their remains were found on June 22, 2014.	Died (unknown cause)	9 weeks
2014	Lisanne Froon	22	Panama	Two Dutch students who disappeared on April 1, 2014, while hiking in Panama. Believing they were on the proper trail, the two women became lost in the backcountry rainforest without supplies. Their remains were found on June 22, 2014.	Died (unknown cause)	9 weeks
2014	Amina Ali	Unknown	Nigeria	One of the schoolgirls kidnappings in Chibok by Boko Haram on April 14–15, 2014. Ali was the first to escape captivity, and was found by Nigerian security forces on May 17, 2016.	Found alive	2 years
2014	Russell Dermond	88	United States	A retired couple murdered in early May 2014 in Putnam County, Georgia. The decapitated body of Russell Dermond was found on May 6, 2014, in the garage of his house in Lake Oconee. Ten days later, Shirley's body was discovered floating in Lake Oconee, her body having been weighted down with concrete blocks.	Murdered	6 days
2014	Shirley Dermond	87	United States	A retired couple murdered in early May 2014 in Putnam County, Georgia. The decapitated body of Russell Dermond was found on May 6, 2014, in the garage of his house in Lake Oconee. Ten days later, Shirley's body was discovered floating in Lake Oconee, her body having been weighted down with concrete blocks.	Murdered	10 days
2014	Charles Bothuell V	12	United States	An American boy from Detroit, Michigan, reported missing by his father in June 2014. When a search was conducted to find him, he was found alive eleven days later locked in his parents' basement.	Found alive	11 days
2014	Nadiya Savchenko	33	Ukraine	A first lieutenant in the Ukrainian Ground Forces, Savchenko was captured by pro-Russian forces in eastern Ukraine during the Russo-Ukrainian War. She was later exchanged in a prisoner swap for two Russian GRU officers captured by Ukraine.	Found alive	23 months
2014	Naftali Fraenkel	16	West Bank	The three Israeli teenagers were kidnapped while hitchhiking home by two members of Hamas on June 12, 2014, and their bodies found 18 days later. The two principal suspects in the case, Marwan Qawasmeh and Amar Abu-Isa Aysha, were later killed by security forces during "Operation Brother's Keeper".	Murdered	18 days
2014	Gilad Shaar	16	West Bank	The three Israeli teenagers were kidnapped while hitchhiking home by two members of Hamas on June 12, 2014, and their bodies found 18 days later. The two principal suspects in the case, Marwan Qawasmeh and Amar Abu-Isa Aysha, were later killed by security forces during "Operation Brother's Keeper".	Murdered	18 days
2014	Eyal Yifrach	19	West Bank	The three Israeli teenagers were kidnapped while hitchhiking home by two members of Hamas on June 12, 2014, and their bodies found 18 days later. The two principal suspects in the case, Marwan Qawasmeh and Amar Abu-Isa Aysha, were later killed by security forces during "Operation Brother's Keeper".	Murdered	18 days
2014	Mohammed Abu Khdeir	16	Israel	The Palestinian teenager was kidnapped from an East Jerusalem street by three Israeli nationals, who subsequently murdered him and dumped his body in the Jerusalem Forest. His body was found hours later, with the three perpetrators being captured and sentenced to life imprisonment for the crime.	Murdered	Same day
2014	Lynn Messer	52	United States	Messer was not in bed next to her husband when he awoke on the morning of July 8, 2014, at their farm in Bloomsdale, Missouri. All her personal effects, including a walking boot she had been wearing to protect her broken toe, were in the house. In November 2016, remains found near the farm were identified as hers.	Died (unknown cause)	2 years 4 months
2014	James Argent	27	United Kingdom	Argent is an English television personality best known for being a regular cast member of The Only Way Is Essex, who is known to have a history of substance abuse. In August 2014, he was reported missing from his home after failing to attend a scheduled flight, but was found only a day later. He was later assigned to rehab, and returned to the show in 2015.	Found alive	1 day
2014	Tina Fontaine	15	Canada	Fontaine was a teenage First Nations girl who went missing from Winnipeg, Manitoba, on August 8, 2014. She was found dead on August 17, 2014, after being found wrapped in plastic and covered with rocks in the Red River.	Murdered	9 days
2014	Nadia Murad	19	Iraq	Murad, a Yazidi student who lived in Kocho, was kidnapped from her native village by ISIL on August 15, 2014. Along with numerous other girls and women, she became a sex slave and was repeatedly tortured by her captors in Mosul. She managed to escape her confinement and convinced a neighboring family to smuggle her out to a refugee camp out of the militant-controlled territories in either September or November 2014. Since her escape, she moved to Germany, and has become a human rights activist and founder of Nadia's Initiative, an organization dedicated to combating genocide, human trafficking and recovering communities affected by mass atrocities.	Found alive	One to three months
2014	Alice Gross	14	United Kingdom	Gross went missing after leaving her home in Hanwell on August 28, 2014. The search for her was the largest deployment of Metropolitan Police officers in a search operation since the 7 July 2005 London bombings. It involved 600 officers from eight forces. Gross's body was found in the River Brent five weeks later, on September 30.	Murdered	5 weeks
2014	Sharmeena Begum	15	United Kingdom	A Bethnal Green schoolgirl who disappeared in December 2014 to become a jihadi bride; she was discovered alive in Syria in March 2023 living under an alias and actively recruiting funds online for Islamic State.	Found alive	More than 8 years
2014	Hanna Lalango	16	Ethiopia	Ethiopian schoolgirl who was abducted by a group of men in a share taxi on October 1, 2014. She was found lying unconscious by a road near Qeranyo ten days later, and succumbed to her injuries a month later.	Found alive	10 days
2014	Hannah Graham	18	United States	Graham was reported missing after last being seen at the Downtown Mall in Charlottesville, Virginia, on September 13, 2014, and her remains were found on October 18, 2014.	Murdered	5 weeks
2014	Shao Tong	20	United States	Shao was a Chinese undergraduate at Iowa State University who disappeared in Nevada, Iowa, and her body later found in Iowa City. Her boyfriend, Li Xiangnan, was arrested, charged and subsequently sentenced to life imprisonment for the murder under Chinese law, which allows prosecution of killings that have occurred abroad.	Murdered	20 days
2014	Atsumi Yoshikubo	45	Canada	Yoshikubo, a Japanese psychiatrist, was last seen on the morning of October 22, 2014, walking along the Ingraham Trail (NT 4) in a wooded area on the northern outskirts of Yellowknife, Northwest Territories, Canada. Her disappearance was not noted until three days later, when she had failed to check out of her hotel and the staff found her luggage, all packed, in her room. An intense search both by the Royal Canadian Mounted Police (RCMP) and concerned local residents over the next few days was called off after a week when the RCMP announced that their investigation had led them to conclude that she came to Yellowknife with the intent to disappear into the wilderness (although she had bought a return ticket to Japan and souvenirs). Ten months later a hunter discovered some of her personal effects along with human remains in the bush off the highway; on April 14, 2016, those remains were positively identified as Yoshikubo's.	Died (unknown cause)	10 months
2014	Lorys Stival	8	Italy	The six-year-old boy was reported missing from his home by his mother Veronica Panarello. His body was found within hours and she was sentenced to 30 years in prison for the murder of her son.	Murdered	6 hours
2014	13 AQAP hostages	Various	Yemen	People of various nationalities held as hostages by AQAP militants, whose rescue was the target of a joint American–Yemeni operation between November 26 and December 6, 2014. While most were rescued, two men, English–American journalist Luke Somers and South African teacher Pierre Korkie, were killed before they could be rescued.	Various	10 days
2014	172 to 185 villagers in Gumsuri	Various	Nigeria	On December 3, 2014, the Nigerian village of Gumsuri was stormed by suspected Boko Haram militants who proceeded to either kill or kidnap any person they came across, predominantly women and children. Between 32 and 35 were killed in the process, and the rest were taken hostage. The Nigerian military was dispatched to rescue them, succeeding in the recovery of an indeterminate amount of hostages; according to survivors, others were either killed during the offensive or had died previously from starvation.	Various	4 months

=== 2015 ===
Date	Person(s)	Age	Country of disappearance	Circumstances	Outcome	Time spent missing or unconfirmed
2015	Ambrose Ball	30	United Kingdom	Ambrose "Jay" Ball, a 30-year-old father from London, disappeared on January 24, 2015, after he was involved in a car accident. Despite police conducting an extensive search, no trace of him was found at the time. A body found in the River Lea in Tottenham, London was identified as being his.	Drowned	More than 2 months
2015	Özgecan Aslan	19	Turkey	Turkish university student who was killed while resisting an attempted rape in Mersin on February 11, 2015. Her killer, minibus driver Ahmet Suphi Altındöken, together with his two accomplices, burned her body, which was discovered two days later. All were sentenced to life imprisonment without parole, and the case sparked protests to combat violence against women in the country.	Murdered	2 days
2015	Becky Watts	16	United Kingdom	Watts, from Crown Hill in the St George area of Bristol, England, went missing on February 19, 2015. Her dismembered body was found on March 3, 2015, in Barton Court, Bristol. Her 33-year-old stepbrother, Nathan Matthews, was convicted of murdering her in November that year.	Murdered	12 days
2015	Lucas Tronche	15	France	French teenager Tronche disappeared from his hometown of Bagnols-sur-Cèze in the Gard département of southern France. His skeletal remains were found in June 2021 near his home, in an area where he often went to collect rocks for his hobby in geology. The cause of death remains unknown.	Died (unknown cause)	6 years
2015	Junpei Yasuda	41	Syria	Japanese freelance journalist who was kidnapped by Tahrir al-Sham militants on June 20–23, 2015, while reporting on events in Syria. He was kept in detention for the next three years, sporadically appearing in hostage videos, until he was released in Antakya, Turkey on October 23, 2018.	Found alive	3 years
2015	Bella Bond	2	United States	A child who was found dead in a plastic bag on the shore of Deer Island in Winthrop, Massachusetts, on June 25, 2015. Authorities pursued investigation into discovering who the child was until her identification in September 2015.	Murdered	Up to 1 month
2015	Karen Buckley	24	United Kingdom	Karen, a nurse from Northern Ireland disappeared on April 12, 2015, after a night out with her friends.	Murdered	3 days
2015	Amanda Peterson	43	United States	Peterson was reported missing on July 3, 2015, after missing a planned dinner. 2 days later she was found dead in her home from an accidental overdose after combining prescription pain medication with illegally obtained morphine after a hysterectomy.	Died (accidental drug overdose)	2 days
2015	Tomislav Salopek	31	Egypt	Croatian topographer who was kidnapped while working in Egypt on July 22, 2015, by the ISIL-affiliated militant group Sinai Province. He was held in hostage until August 12, when his kidnappers killed him and showcased his decapitated corpse in a video.	Murdered	Less than 1 month
2015	DJ Derek	74	United Kingdom	Pioneering British disc jockey, last seen leaving a pub in the St Pauls neighbourhood of his native Bristol on July 11, 2015; his body was found in March 2016 near The Mall, Cribbs Causeway. Avon and Somerset Police spokesmen said that investigators were satisfied that there was nothing to suggest that the death was suspicious.	Died (unknown cause)	8 months
2015	Ese Oruru	13	Nigeria	Oruru was a Nigerian youth who was kidnapped from her home village in Bayelsa State, whereupon she was repeatedly raped, forcibly Islamized and married to her kidnapper. She was rescued by State Police on February 29, 2016, and her kidnapper, Yunusa Dahiru, was eventually sentenced to 26 years' imprisonment.	Found alive	6 months
2015	Atika Dolkifli	23	Singapore	On 1 September 2015, 23-year-old part-time waitress Atika Dolkifli was reported missing by her father, after she failed to return home the previous night from work. Her body was discovered two days later at a carpark in Toa Payoh, Singapore. Following investigations, a 24-year-old man named Syed Maffi Hasan, who was a male friend of the victim, was arrested and charged with murder. Investigations revealed that Atika was murdered by Syed Maffi, after the both of them argued over the repair costs of a mobile phone which Atika given to Syed Maffi on the top deck of the carpark, and Syed Maffi had assaulted Atika by pushing her down a flight of stairs in a fit of rage before he threw her off the fifth floor of the carpark. In May 2019, Syed Maffi was found guilty of murdering Atika and two months later, he was sentenced to life imprisonment and 12 strokes of the cane.	Murdered	4 days
2015	Ebby Steppach	18	United States	Steppach was an American woman who disappeared on October 25, 2015 from Little Rock, Arkansas. Steppach's body was discovered in a drainage pipe in Chalamont Park on May 14, 2018.	Murdered	Less than 3 years
2015	Yuliya Balykina	31	Belarus	Belarusian sprinter who competed at the Women's 100 metres at the 2012 Summer Olympics. She was reported missing on October 28, 2015, and her body found in Minsk on November 16. Her boyfriend later confessed to her murder.	Murdered	19 days
2015	Tiahleigh Palmer	12	Australia	An Australian girl from Logan City, Queensland, who disappeared on October 30, 2015. Her remains were found on November 5, 2015, on the banks of the Pimpama River. In 2016 her foster father was charged with murdering her; several other members of the family pleaded guilty to charges related to their attempts to cover up in the case.	Murdered	6 days
2015	Yim Fung	52	China	A Chinese joint chairman and chief executive of Guotai Junan International Holdings Limited, a subsidiary of Guotai Junan Securities, who disappeared on November 18, 2015, but returned to work on December 22, 2015.	Found alive	5 weeks
2015	David Lytton	67	United Kingdom	An unidentified body was found close to Dovestone Reservoir on Saddleworth Moor, in the South Pennines of Northern England on December 12, 2015. He had died via a lethal dosage of strychnine in an act of suicide. His remains were identified in 2017.	Suicide	13 months
2015	Sian Blake	43	United Kingdom	Blake, a British actress, and her two children were reported missing on December 16, 2015. Three weeks later their bodies were found at Blake's home in Erith, London. Her partner, Arthur Simpson-Kent, pleaded guilty to the murders and was given a whole life sentence in October 2016.	Murdered	3 weeks
2015	Gui Minhai	51	Thailand	The Chinese-born Swedish scholar and book publisher went missing in Thailand on October 17, 2015. He was the second of five book publishers to go missing around the same time. He had been abducted by Chinese authorities and taken to China, ostensibly in relation to a fatal hit and run car accident in 2003 when authorities claimed he had been driving while intoxicated. He later appeared on Chinese television and made an apparent confession a few months after disappearing, which observers believed to have been forced. Complaints about alleged Chinese abduction reached high political levels in Britain and the United States. Later, Gui was charged in China with "illegal business operations", without reference to the earlier allegations.	Found alive	Several months
2015	Kayleigh Haywood	15	United Kingdom	Haywood was an English schoolgirl who was lured into the house of an older man, Luke Harlow, in Ibstock on November 13, 2015. Harlow later invited his neighbor, Stephen Beadman, who proceeded to rape and eventually kill her before dumping her body in the lakeside. Both men were later arrested and convicted in relation to her murder.	Murdered	5 days
2015	Jihadi John	27	Syria	Mohammed Emwazi, better known by his moniker "Jihadi John", was a Kuwaiti-British man of Iraqi descent who was a member of the terrorist group, The Beatles, an ISIL terrorist cell named after the famous English band due to the members' distinct accents. He was responsible or took part in numerous beheadings, among them being American-Israeli journalist Steven Sotloff, Japanese journalist Kenji Goto, several Syrian soldiers and numerous others. On November 12, 2015, American officials reported that he had been killed in a drone strike in Raqqa, Syria, with his death officially confirmed three months later by ISIL representatives.	Died (drone strike)	3 months
2015	Steve Gohouri	34	Krefeld, Germany	Steve Gohouri was an Ivorian professional association football player who disappeared on December 12, 2015, and was found dead almost three weeks later in the Rhine river.	Drowned	More than two weeks

=== 2016 ===
Date	Person(s)	Age	Country of disappearance	Circumstances	Outcome	Time spent missing or unconfirmed
2016	Béatrice Stöckli	Unknown	Mali	Swiss Christian missionary who was captured by JNIM militants in Mali. She was kept as a hostage for the next four years, until she was executed in October 2020. Her remains were recovered in March 2021.	Murdered	5 years
2016	28 miners working at the Atenas mine	Various	Venezuela	The miners were allegedly attacked by an armed group named Banda del Topo on March 8, 2016, and all of them were abducted at gunpoint. By the end of the next week, most of the miners' bodies were found in a mass grave, but a few of them remain missing.	Murdered	1 week
2016	Paige Doherty	15	Scotland	Doherty was a Scottish schoolgirl who was last seen entering a delicatessen in Clydebank on March 19, 2016. Two days later her body was found on a roadside nearby. She had been stabbed 61 times by the owner of the deli, who claimed that Doherty threatened to tell people that he had "touched her" inappropriately if he refused to give her a job.	Murdered	2 days
2016	Gordon Semple	59	United Kingdom	A British Metropolitan Police officer murdered by an individual whom he had met online via Grindr. Semple was strangled to death and his body extensively dismembered. Semple's killer, Stefano Brizzi, was arrested on 7 April.	Murdered	6 days
2016	Ingrid Lyne	40	United States	40-year-old Ingrid Maree Lyne was last seen alive by friends on April 8, 2016, and was reported missing the following day. Later that day, police responding to a call from a homeowner found several of Lyne's dismembered body parts—including a severed head, foot, arm, and leg—in a Seattle recycling bin. John Charlton, a homeless day laborer with a criminal record in six states, pleaded guilty to Lyne's murder in October 2017. In January 2018, Charlton was sentenced to more than 27 years in prison.	Murdered	1 day
2016	Helen Bailey	51	United Kingdom	The British writer of children's and teenage fiction was reported missing after allegedly taking her dog for a walk in Royston, Hertfordshire, England, in April 2016. No trace of her was found initially, but in July 2016 her remains (and the dog's) were found in a cesspit under the garage of her home and her partner was charged with her murder.	Murdered	3 months
2016	Charity Aiyedogbon	Unknown	Nigeria	A Nigerian businesswoman who disappeared without a trace on May 9, 2016. It was later learned that her boyfriend Paul Ezeugo and his friend, Emmanuel Adogah, murdered her and stole her car. The police had been on a manhunt for the two suspects since May 2016 when Charity's mutilated body was found packaged in two sacks at a river bank in Ushafa, a satellite community in Bwari Area Council of the Federal Capital Territory, Abuja.	Murdered	Unclear
2016	Claude Callegari	53	United Kingdom	English football fan and contributor to the AFTV YouTube channel who went missing from his home in Essex on July 1, 2016, but returned home soon after. He later said that the disappearance was a result of mental health issues.	Found alive	2 days
2016	Yangjie Li	25	Germany	A 25-year-old Anhalt University of Applied Sciences architecture student. Li—a Chinese native—disappeared while jogging close to her apartment; her body was discovered on May 13. A 20-year-old local man named Sebastian Flech was sentenced to life imprisonment for her murder in November 2017.	Murdered	2 days
2016	Emilie Meng	17	Denmark	Emilie Meng was a Danish teenage girl who disappeared in Korsør on July 10, 2016 and was found dead five months later after being killed.	Murdered	5 months
2016	Cui Yajie	31	Singapore	Cui Yajie was a 31-year-old engineer born and raised in Tianjin, China before she came to Singapore in 2012 to look for work. Cui went missing in July 12, 2016, and her 48-year-old boyfriend Leslie Khoo Kwee Hock was the last person to see her alive. Khoo was interrogated as a suspect, and he eventually confessed that he killed Cui during a heated argument in their car. Khoo also admitted that he burned the body for three consecutive days inside a forest at Lim Chu Kang, and later led the police to where he burned the body. Khoo was arrested on July 20, 2016, and charged with murder. Three years later, the High Court of Singapore found 51-year-old Khoo guilty of murder and sentenced him to life imprisonment.	Murdered	8 days
2016	Sierah Joughin	20	United States	Joughin was an American woman who was abducted in Delta, Ohio, on July 19, 2016. Her remains were found three days later in a shallow grave, and a nearby resident was charged with her abduction and murder.	Murdered	3 days
2016	Philip Finnegan	24	Ireland	Finnegan was an Irish criminal who was murdered on August 10, 2016, for supposedly owing money to the Dublin mafia. His body was found on September 2, and his killer, Stephen Penrose, was subsequently convicted and sentenced to life imprisonment.	Murdered	27 days
2016	Elizabeth Griffith	29	United States	A victim of convicted serial killer and rapist Shawn Grate. Griffith was last seen alive in Ashland County, Ohio, on August 16, 2016. An autopsy concluded she was strangled to death.	Murdered	1 month
2016	Diana Quer	18	Spain	18-year-old Diana Quer disappeared in the small town of A Pobra do Caramiñal in Galicia, Spain, during the early morning hours of 22 August 2016. On 25 December 2017, 41-year-old José Abuín, who was being interrogated in relation to an attack on another woman that morning, confessed to murdering Quer and revealed the location of her body. On 17 December 2019, Abuín was found guilty of aggravated murder, kidnapping, and sexual assault, and was sentenced to life imprisonment.	Murdered	1 year
2016	Chad Robinson	36	Australia	Australian professional rugby league footballer who was reported missing on November 26, 2016. His fate remained unclear until December 22, when his body was found inside a crashed car in Kenthurst.	Suicide	26 days
2016	Narumi Kurosaki	21	France	Japanese student who went missing in Besançon in December 2016. In 2022, her ex-boyfriend, a Chilean national named Nicolás Zepeda, was found guilty of murder. Zepeda has since appealed the sentence and is waiting retrial. Kurosaki's body has yet to be found. On February 26, 2025, the Court of Cassation, France's highest appeals court, ordered a retrial and ruled that the Chilean would remain in jail for a third trial for the murder.	Murdered	Not found

=== 2017 ===
Date	Person(s)	Age	Country of disappearance	Circumstances	Outcome	Time spent missing or unconfirmed
2017	Dean Finnochiaro	19	United States	All four men went missing around the same time frame; Finnochiaro, Meo and Sturgis were found buried in a 12-foot-deep grave, while the body of Patrick was found buried in a 6-foot-deep grave on the same property, not far from the other bodies. Cosmo DiNardo and his cousin, Sean Kratz, pleaded guilty to the robbery and murders of all four men.	Murdered	4–5 days
2017	Thomas Meo	21	United States	All four men went missing around the same time frame; Finnochiaro, Meo and Sturgis were found buried in a 12-foot-deep grave, while the body of Patrick was found buried in a 6-foot-deep grave on the same property, not far from the other bodies. Cosmo DiNardo and his cousin, Sean Kratz, pleaded guilty to the robbery and murders of all four men.	Murdered	4–5 days
2017	Jimi Patrick	19	United States	All four men went missing around the same time frame; Finnochiaro, Meo and Sturgis were found buried in a 12-foot-deep grave, while the body of Patrick was found buried in a 6-foot-deep grave on the same property, not far from the other bodies. Cosmo DiNardo and his cousin, Sean Kratz, pleaded guilty to the robbery and murders of all four men.	Murdered	4–5 days
2017	Mark Sturgis	22	United States	All four men went missing around the same time frame; Finnochiaro, Meo and Sturgis were found buried in a 12-foot-deep grave, while the body of Patrick was found buried in a 6-foot-deep grave on the same property, not far from the other bodies. Cosmo DiNardo and his cousin, Sean Kratz, pleaded guilty to the robbery and murders of all four men.	Murdered	4–5 days
2017	Marrisa Shen	13	Canada	A Canadian schoolgirl who was raped and murdered by Ibrahim Ali, a Syrian refugee who had recently arrived in Canada, in a secluded area of a park in Burnaby, British Columbia. She was reported missing by her parents a few hours before her body was found, after she failed to return home from what was supposed to be a brief trip to a nearby Tim Hortons.	Murdered	1 day
2017	Genesis Cornejo-Alvarado	15	United States	Cornejo-Alvarado was an American schoolgirl who was kidnapped, raped, drugged, and ultimately killed by two Salvadoran MS-13 gang members in January 2017 in Houston, Texas. Her body was found on a street, and positively identified a month later. The killers were later sentenced to 40 years' imprisonment for her murder.	Murdered	1 month
2017	Birna Brjánsdóttir	20	Iceland	Vanished while going to a club in Reykjavík with her friends on January 14, 2017. Her body was later found in the ocean, with indications that she had been killed. Subsequently, fisherman and drug smuggler Thomas Møller Olsen was convicted and sentenced to 19 years' imprisonment for her murder.	Murdered	8 days
2017	Randy Potter	53	United States	Potter was last seen leaving his Lenexa, Kansas, home on the morning of January 17, 2017. On September 12, his decomposed body was found in his truck, parked at Kansas City International Airport, where he had apparently gone to take his own life the morning of his disappearance.	Suicide	8 months
2017	Alianna DeFreeze	14	United States	American schoolgirl who was kidnapped, raped, tortured and subsequently killed in Cleveland, Ohio on January 26, 2017, with her body found three days later. Her killer, a hardened criminal named Christopher Whittaker, was later found guilty and sentenced to death for the murder. DeFreeze's case served as an inspiration to introduce laws concerning child safety.	Murdered	3 days
2017	Abigail Williams	13	United States	Abigail Williams and Liberty German were two American teenage girls who disappeared from Delphi, Indiana, on February 13, 2017, while they were hiking on a trail and they were reported missing after their parents called the police. They were found dead the next day after being killed.	Murdered	1 day
2017	Liberty German	14	United States	Abigail Williams and Liberty German were two American teenage girls who disappeared from Delphi, Indiana, on February 13, 2017, while they were hiking on a trail and they were reported missing after their parents called the police. They were found dead the next day after being killed.	Murdered	1 day
2017	Zaida Catalán	36	Democratic Republic of the Congo	Swedish politician and activist who was abducted on March 12, 2017, while on a UN mission in the Democratic Republic of the Congo, together with her American colleague Michael Sharp. Their decapitated bodies were found in shallow graves not long after. More than 50 people were arrested and later convicted of the case, with sentences ranging from death to 10 years' imprisonment.	Murdered	More than 2 weeks
2017	Tina Satchwell	45	Ireland	Tina Satchwell was reported missing by her husband after she was last seen on March 20, 2017, at their home in Youghal, Ireland. Six years after her disappearance, on October 11, 2023, Richard Satchwell was arrested on suspicion of her murder after a utility company had found suspicious materials whilst inspecting a drainage block in the area. A police search conducted at his home the following day discovered human remains wrapped in black plastic and buried underneath a concrete floor in his stairwell. The remains were confirmed to be those of Tina Satchwell's via dental records, and he was subsequently charged with murder.	Murdered	6 years, 6 months and 25 days
2017	Akbar Salubiro	25	Indonesia	Akbar Salubiro was a man who went missing on March 25, 2017, in Mamuju, Indonesia. His remains were found two days later inside the body of a reticulated python.	Killed and eaten by a reticulated python	2 days
2017	Bruno Borges	24	Brazil	Bruno de Melo Silva Borges is a Brazilian student who disappeared after leaving his home in Rio Branco, Acre on March 27, 2017. In his bedroom, Bruno left several encrypted messages, 14 handwritten books, and a statue of the philosopher Giordano Bruno. The Civil Police of Acre investigated the case and Interpol was called. Borges' disappearance got wide coverage on the Internet, generating memes. At dawn on August 11 the same year, Borges returned to his house. During the investigation, it was revealed Borges had the help of two friends and a cousin to carry out the "project", and that he had signed a contract allocating part of the proceeds of the sale of his books to his three helpers. Since then, there have been several accusations the case was a scheme to promote Borges' books. Borges disagrees, stating that the accusations were made by sensationalist media.	Found alive	5 months
2017	Serena McKay	19	Canada	An Indigenous woman from Manitoba, Canada, whose murder was recorded and posted on social media—including streaming on Facebook Live. McKay was found dead after she had died ultimately of hypothermia following a sustained assault after she was reported missing. Her primary assailants were two teenage girls aged 16 and 17.	Murdered	1 day
2017	Yingying Zhang	26	United States	Zhang was kidnapped on June 9, 2017, when visiting Chinese scholar at the University of Illinois at Urbana–Champaign. She was abducted by Brendt Allen Christensen, a Champaign resident and former physics graduate student at the university. Christensen lured Zhang into his car at a bus stop on campus with the promise of a ride after she missed a bus, but then took her to his apartment where he raped her while his wife was out of town for the weekend. On June 30, 2017, the Federal Bureau of Investigation (FBI) arrested and charged Christensen in federal court. Christensen was convicted of one count of kidnapping resulting in death and two counts of making false statements to agents of the FBI, for which he received a sentence of life imprisonment.	Killed during kidnapping	Not found
2017	Alloura Wells	27	Canada	Alloura Wells was a Canadian woman who disappeared in July 2017 and was found dead on August 5, 2017 and wasn't identified until November 23 after she had been reported missing.	Drowned	5 months
2017	Derk Bolt	62	Colombia	Dutch TV presenter who was kidnapped together with a colleague on June 17, 2017, from the Colombian town of El Tarra, by ELN militants. The pair were released without harm a few days after their abduction.	Found alive	4 days
2017	Santiago Maldonado	27	Argentina	Maldonado was an Argentine craftsman and tattoo artist from the town of Veinticinco de Mayo, province of Buenos Aires, who was reported missing after a demonstration in Chubut on August 1, 2017. His body was found three months after, drowned at Chubut River. On October 21, 2017, after a 12-hour autopsy involving 55 experts, Judge Gustavo Lleral confirmed that Maldonado's body did not have any signs of violence and the cause of death was established as death by drowning.	Drowned	10 weeks
2017	Ali Zeidan	67	Libya	Former Prime Minister of Libya and liberal politician twice kidnapped by armed militants, in 2013 and 2017, but was released without incident both times.	Found alive	10 days
2017	Maëlys de Araujo	8	France	Maëlys de Araujo disappeared during a wedding party in Le Pont-de-Beauvoisin, Isère, on the night of August 26–27, 2017. In February 2018, Nordahl Lelandais, who had been arrested on suspicion of kidnapping her, told police he had accidentally killed her and led them where he had hidden her body.	Murdered	6 months
2017	Sherin Mathews	3	United States	Mathews was an Indian-American toddler from Richardson, Texas who disappeared on October 7, 2017. Her body was found on October 22, 2017, in a culvert under a road near her home.	Murdered	15 days
2017	Alex Batty	11	Spain	Alex Batty went missing at the age of 11 in October 2017. Batty disappeared after going on a holiday trip to Spain with his mother and grandfather. For the following six years, Batty lived with them in Morocco, Spain, and southwest France. At the age of 14, Batty decided to return to a more traditional life, and escaped three years later at the age of 17. In December 2023, Batty left for Toulouse and was later found by a delivery driver.	Found alive	6 years
2017	Tala Farea	15–16	United States	Saudi Arabian sisters whose bodies were found floating in the Hudson River. Coroners determined that they died in a suicide pact, allegedly to escape the abuse they had suffered while living in a facility.	Suicide	More than 1 year
2017	Rotana Farea	22–23	United States	Saudi Arabian sisters whose bodies were found floating in the Hudson River. Coroners determined that they died in a suicide pact, allegedly to escape the abuse they had suffered while living in a facility.	Suicide	More than 1 year
2017	Ko Joon-hee	5	South Korea	South Korean girl who disappeared from Jeonju on November 18, 2017, but was reported missing a month later. It was later discovered that she had died following horrific abuse by her biological father, and was later found buried on a hill.	Murdered	1 month
2017	Tess Richey	22	Canada	Tess Richey was a Canadian woman who disappeared from Toronto, Ontario on November 25, 2017 and was found dead on November 29, 2017 after being killed.	Murdered	4 days
2017	M Maroof Zaman	Unknown	Bangladesh	Former Bangladeshi diplomat and ambassador to Vietnam who was abducted on December 4, 2017, by a group of unidentified men. His fate remained unknown until March 16, 2019, when he was allowed to safely return home.	Found alive	1 year

=== 2018 ===
Date	Person(s)	Age	Country of disappearance	Circumstances	Outcome	Time spent missing or unconfirmed
2018	Zainab Ansari	7–8	Pakistan	Zainab Ansari was kidnapped by serial killer Imran Ali on January 4, 2018, while on her way to Quran recitation classes at her home in Kasur, Pakistan. Her body, showing signs of brutal rape and torture pre-mortem, was later found at a garbage disposal site.	Murdered	5 days
2018	Blaze Bernstein	19	United States	A Jewish student murdered by a former high school classmates and member of neo-Nazi terrorist group Atomwaffen Division both due to his religion and the fact he was gay.	Murdered	8 days
2018	Vladimir Cvijan	41	Serbia	Cvijan, a former member of the National Assembly of Serbia, disappeared under suspicious circumstances in January 2018. His death was confirmed by the Serbian government in March 2021.	Drowned	3 years
2018	Mark Salling	35	United States	Mark Salling, an American actor and musician known for his role as Noah "Puck" Puckerman on the television series Glee, was reported missing on January 30, 2018. His body was discovered hanging from a tree in the Sunland area of Los Angeles near his home. Salling's death was ruled a suicide; he had pleaded guilty in 2017 to possession of child pornography, and a sentencing hearing had been scheduled for March 7, 2018.	Suicide	6 hours
2018	Pamela Mastropietro	18	Italy	Italian drug addict who was killed by a Nigerian drug dealer in Rome on January 30, 2018; her mutilated body, stuffed in two suitcases, was found the next month. The killer, Innocent Oseghale, was convicted and sentenced to life imprisonment in the case.	Murdered	2 days
2018	Timothy J. Cunningham	36	United States	Epidemiologist working for the U.S. Center for Disease Control and Prevention and author of 28 publications centering around sleep deprivation and various diseases, Cunningham vanished after leaving his workplace, complaining that he did not feel well. His body was found in the Chattahoochee River after more than a month, having drowned in apparent suicide.	Suicide	More than 1 month
2018	Latifa bint Mohammed Al Maktoum	33	United Arab Emirates	Member of Dubai's ruling family who was abducted on orders of her father in March 2018, after she attempted to escape from the country. As of 2021, she has allegedly been seen travelling freely across Europe, with several people campaigning for her release being personally contacted by her as well.	Found alive	3 years
2018	Scott Hutchison	36	United Kingdom	Hutchison, the lead singer for Scottish indie rock band Frightened Rabbit, disappeared on May 9, 2018, from a hotel in South Queensferry, Scotland. Two days later, his body was found at the nearby Port Edgar marina.	Died by suicide	2 days
2018	Ana Kriégel	14	Ireland	Kriégel was a Russian-Irish girl who was abducted, sexually assaulted and murdered by a pair of underage boys in Lucan, Dublin. The two unnamed boys, the youngest to be charged with murder in Irish history, were subsequently sentenced to life imprisonment and 15 years, respectively.	Murdered	3 days
2018	Susanna Feldmann	14	Germany	German girl who was kidnapped, raped and killed in Wiesbaden on May 22, 2018, and her remains found in early June of that year. Her killer, Ali Bashar Ahmad Zebari, an Iraqi Kurdish refugee, was sentenced to life imprisonment for the murder, which spawned anti-immigrant sentiments.	Murdered	Approx 2 weeks
2018	Tianna Phillips	25	United States	Disappeared from Berwick, Pennsylvania on June 13, 2018, following an argument with her boyfriend. She was bludgeoned and stabbed to death by serial killer Harold Haulman, who confessed to her murder in 2021. Her remains are believed to have been discarded in Scott Township, but were never found.	Murdered	Not found
2018	Dennis Day	76	United States	Day was a theatre director, and had previously been a cast member of The Mickey Mouse Club. He was last seen alive on July 17, 2018, and his body was discovered in April 2019. A live-in handyman, Daniel James Burda, was later charged with several counts regarding Day's death, including his manslaughter.	Died (unknown cause)	9 months
2018	Vance Rodriguez	42	United States	Rodriguez, an American hiker who disappeared from New York City in July 2018, was found dead on July 23, 2018, in the Big Cypress National Preserve. Rodriguez was previously known as "Mostly Harmless", "Ben Bilemy" and "Denim", before he was identified in 2021.	Starvation	2–3 weeks
2018	Mollie Tibbetts	20	United States	Tibbetts, a University of Iowa student, was last seen during an evening jog on July 18, 2018. She was later found and pronounced dead on August 21, 2018.	Murdered	1 month
2018	Chrysa Spiliotis	62	Greece	Greek stage and television actress who perished during a wildfire in Mati on July 23, 2018. Her body was identified several days after her husband's.	Killed in wildfire	6 days
2018	Hasinur Rahman	Unknown	Bangladesh	Hasinur Rahman is an ex-Bangladesh Army soldier who was abducted by police on August 8, 2018, for an unclear reason. He was detained for two years, before being released on February 22, 2020.	Found alive	2 years
2018	Meng Hongwei	64	China	The president of Interpol visited his home country China in September 2018 and was reported missing by his wife on October 4, after he had no contact with her or anyone else since September 29. On October 8, Chinese authorities confirmed that he was arrested for alleged corruption and bribery.	Found alive	9 days
2018	Jamal Khashoggi	59	Turkey	The Saudi Arabian journalist was not seen since he had an appointment at the Saudi consulate in Istanbul on October 2, 2018. Saudi state television confirmed his death on October 20. According to Turkish authorities, he was murdered by Saudi intelligence agents. The murder is alleged to have been captured on listening equipment in the embassy.	Murdered	Not found
2018	Jayme Closs	13	United States	Closs disappeared on October 15, 2018, from her home in Barron, Wisconsin. Both of her parents were shot to death and she was abducted. Jake Thomas Patterson pleaded guilty to two counts of first-degree intentional homicide and one count of kidnapping. Closs was recovered alive after she escaped on January 9, 2019. On May 24, 2019, Patterson was sentenced to two consecutive life sentences in prison without the possibility of parole plus an additional 40 years.	Found alive	3 months
2018	Tahir Dawar	49	Pakistan	Tahir Dawar (Urdu: طاہر داوڑ; Pashto: طاهر داوړ), who went by his middle name of "Tahir", was kidnapped on October 26, 2018, from Islamabad and murdered. Dawar was a Pashto poet and police officer from Pakistan. On November 13, 2018, Dawar's body was found in the Dur Baba District of Nangarhar Province.	Murdered	20 days
2018	Michael Spavor	42	China	Canadian consultant who, together diplomat Michael Kovrig, were detained in Beijing, China in December 2018 on politically motivated charges relating to the recent arrest of Meng Wanzhou. The pair were held in detention and given prison sentences for supposed espionage, but were later released after the DOJ dropped charges against Wanzhou.	Found alive	3 years
2018	Joy Morgan	20	United Kingdom	British university student Morgan was last seen at a church celebration in Ilford on December 26, 2018. On December 28 her name was removed from a "church social media chat group". It was not until February 7, 2019, that concerned flatmates reported her missing. Two days later a man who attended the same church as Morgan was arrested and Morgan's keys were found in his car. It was later found that her phone had been detected in his car on December 28, most likely as he attempted to dispose of her body. The man, Shohfah-El Israel, was convicted of her murder on August 5, 2019, but he refused to reveal the location of her body. Two months after the conviction her body was found in woodland near Stevenage.	Murdered	8 months

=== 2019 ===
Date	Person(s)	Age	Country of disappearance	Circumstances	Outcome	Time spent missing or unconfirmed
2019	Emiliano Sala	28	United Kingdom	Emiliano Sala, a footballer, disappeared two days after signing with Cardiff City from FC Nantes in a suspected plane crash en route from Nantes to Cardiff, on January 21, 2019. Guernsey Police announced that they had called off the search for the plane or survivors. On February 3, it was announced that another underwater search for the aircraft had begun, using the AAIB's Geo Ocean III vessel which, together with a privately funded vessel, was conducting sonar surveys. On February 4, investigators stated that there was one body visible inside the wreckage. On February 7, the body was formally identified as that of Sala by Dorset Police.	Plane crash	17 days
2019	Libby Squire	22	United Kingdom	University of Hull student who was lured, raped and subsequently murdered by Pawel Relowicz on 1 February 2019, who dumped her body in the River Hull. Her body was found on March 20. Relowicz was later convicted and sentenced to life for her murder.	Murdered	1 month
2019	Caroline Mwatha	37	Kenya	Mwatha was a Kenyan human rights activist who went missing on February 6, 2019. Mwatha was later found dead just six days later on February 12 in Nairobi's City mortuary.	Exsanguination	6 days
2019	Leah Croucher	19	England	Croucher, a British woman, was reported missing on February 15, 2019, last seen alive on CCTV on February 15, 2019, at 8:16 am on Buzzacott Lane in Furzton. Her remains were found on October 12, 2022, and identified as hers on October 21, 2022. In June 2024, a coroner's inquest concluded that Croucher had been unlawfully killed by convicted sex offender Neil Maxwell	Murdered	3 years
2019	Andreen McDonald	29	United States	McDonald, a 29-year-old businesswoman and philanthropist from Port Antonio, Jamaica, who resided in San Antonio, Texas, was murdered in her home by her husband, U.S. Air Force major Andre McDonald, on February 28, 2019. Andreen McDonald was reported missing on March 1, 2019, and her remains were found by a passerby on a private ranch in northern Bexar County, Texas, on July 11, 2019. In 2023, Andre McDonald was found guilty of manslaughter and sentenced to 20 years in prison.	Murdered	4 months
2019	Lam Wing-kee	63	Taiwan	Lam Wing-kee was a Hong Kong businessman and owner of Causeway Bay Books in Taipei, Taiwan who imposed a self-exile in response to the Hong Kong extradition bill disappeared in April 2019. He resurfaced a year later.	Found alive	1 year
2019	Mackenzie Lueck	23	United States	University of Utah student who was reported missing after going to meet a date on June 17, 2019. Following the arrest of the man, Nigerian national Ayoola Ajayi, authorities located Lueck's body—she had been bound, strangled and her remains burned. Ajayi subsequently pleaded guilty and was sentenced to life imprisonment without parole.	Murdered	11 days
2019	Desmond "Etika" Amofah	29	United States	Amofah, a YouTuber better known by his online alias Etika, posted a YouTube video titled "I'm sorry" to his personal YouTube channel TR1Iceman, alluding to his suicidal thoughts as he was walking down New York City streets; in the video he admitted to having mental health issues, struggled with the attention he had been getting from streaming, and apologized for pushing people away from him. Prior to the incident, Amofah had gotten fame for reacting to famous gaming, notably Nintendo Directs. He was last heard from at 8 pm that night and was reported missing to the New York Police Department (NYPD) by June 20. On the evening of June 24, NYPD and emergency medical services had recovered his body near Pier 16, approximately half a mile (0.8 km) down the East River and confirmed that he was deceased by the point of recovery. Two days later, the Office of Chief Medical Examiner determined that the cause of death was drowning, and the manner was suicide.	Suicide	4 days
2019	Rafael Acosta Arévalo	50	Venezuela	Venezuelan military officer who was abducted, tortured and later killed by the DGCIM on June 22, 2019. It was carried out on orders from Nicolás Maduro, who claimed that Arévalo had planned a coup d'état.	Murdered	1 week
2019	Florijana Ismaili	24	Italy	On June 29, 2019, Switzerland national team footballer Ismaili dived into the water from a boat diving platform while on holiday at Lake Como in Lombardy, but did not resurface. The next day, she was declared missing. Local authorities conducted an investigation, including using remotely operated underwater vehicles (ROV). On July 2, Ismaili's body was found at the bottom of Lake Como at a depth of 204 metres (669 feet). An autopsy revealed that the cause of death was from "an acute episode of asphyxia".	Drowned	3 days
2019	Suzanne Eaton	59	Greece	Eaton was an American scientist and professor of molecular biology at the Max Planck Institute of Molecular Cell Biology and Genetics in Dresden, Germany. She was last seen on July 2, 2019, playing the piano within the hotel lobby where she was attending a works conference in Chania, Crete. Her body was discovered six days later. An autopsy determined she had died by asphyxiation. The following year, a 27-year-old named Giannis Paraskakis was convicted of her rape and murder. He was sentenced to life imprisonment.	Murdered	6 days
2019	Yasuhiro Takemoto	47	Fushimi, Kyoto, Japan	Takemoto, Nishiya, and Kigami were Japanese animators and film directors. All three were unaccounted for and reported missing by their family following the 2019 Kyoto Animation arson attack. Their deaths in the arson attack were confirmed by August 2, 2019.	Murdered	1 week
2019	Futoshi Nishiya	37	Fushimi, Kyoto, Japan	Takemoto, Nishiya, and Kigami were Japanese animators and film directors. All three were unaccounted for and reported missing by their family following the 2019 Kyoto Animation arson attack. Their deaths in the arson attack were confirmed by August 2, 2019.	Murdered	1 week
2019	Yoshiji Kigami	61	Fushimi, Kyoto, Japan	Takemoto, Nishiya, and Kigami were Japanese animators and film directors. All three were unaccounted for and reported missing by their family following the 2019 Kyoto Animation arson attack. Their deaths in the arson attack were confirmed by August 2, 2019.	Murdered	1 week
2019	Alexandra Măceșanu	15	Romania	Măceșanu and Melencu were two teenage girls who were kidnapped on July 25, 2019, in Olt County, Caracal, Romania. Though their bodies were not recovered it was later revealed that their kidnapper had killed them.	Murdered	Bodies not found
2019	Luiza Melencu	18	Romania	Măceșanu and Melencu were two teenage girls who were kidnapped on July 25, 2019, in Olt County, Caracal, Romania. Though their bodies were not recovered it was later revealed that their kidnapper had killed them.	Murdered	Bodies not found
2019	V. G. Siddhartha	59	Mangaluru, Karnataka, India	V. G. Siddhartha was an Indian businessman from Karnataka who had disappeared on July 29, 2019, and was found dead on July 31, 2019, near the mouth of the river Nethravati after committing suicide by drowning himself.	Suicide	2 days
2019	Emma Grace Cole	3	Delaware, United States	Cole went missing sometime in July 2019 and her remains were found two months later. She was found to have been tortured and murdered, and the killers were Cole's birth mother Kristie Lynn Haas and stepfather Brandon. Haas was jailed for 30 years on charges of murder and abuse while Brandon was convicted of endangering the welfare of a child and sentenced to jail for more than four years.	Murdered	2 months
2019	Tylee Ryan	16	United States	Tylee Ryan and J. J. Vallow were two American siblings from Rexburg, Idaho, who disappeared in September 2019 under circumstances involving their mother Lori Vallow and her lover (later husband) Chad Daybell. Their bodies were later discovered in June 2020 and Vallow and Daybell were charged with the murder of the children in June 2021. Vallow and Daybell were convicted of their murders in 2023, and in 2024 respectively.	Murdered	9 months
2019	J. J. Vallow	7	United States	Tylee Ryan and J. J. Vallow were two American siblings from Rexburg, Idaho, who disappeared in September 2019 under circumstances involving their mother Lori Vallow and her lover (later husband) Chad Daybell. Their bodies were later discovered in June 2020 and Vallow and Daybell were charged with the murder of the children in June 2021. Vallow and Daybell were convicted of their murders in 2023, and in 2024 respectively.	Murdered	9 months
2019	Kathleen Jo Henry	30	United States	Sexually assaulted and murdered at a TownePlace Suites hotel in Anchorage, Alaska on September 4, 2019, but her body was found only on October 2. Her alleged killer, South African-born Brian Steven Smith, has been charged with her murder and that of another woman and is awaiting trial.	Murdered	1 month
2019	Harmony Montgomery	5	United States	A five-year-old child murdered by her biological father, Adam Montgomery, in Manchester, New Hampshire sometime in the fall of 2019. Harmony's body was never found. Her father was found guilty of second-degree murder in February 2024.	Murdered	3 years
2019	Chan Yin-lam	15	Hong Kong	A 15-year-old student whose nude body was found floating in the sea near Yau Tong, Hong Kong on September 22, 2019. Although police asserted that her death was not a result of foul play, and a jury later returned an open verdict, speculation remains that Yin-lam was murdered by Hong Kong authorities in connection with her participation in the 2019 Hong Kong protests.	Died (unknown cause)	3 days
2019	Elisa Pomarelli	29	Italy	A 29-year-old woman went missing in Carpaneto Piacentino on 25 August 2019 and was later found murdered.	Murdered	13 days
2019	Yolanda Klug	23	Germany	Klug was a German woman who disappeared in Leipzig on September 25, 2019, and whose disappearance has been linked to Scientology. A walker discovered her bones on February 25, 2023, in the "Rödel" forest area near Freyburg. The cause of death is unclear.	Died (unknown cause)	3 years, 5 months and 5 days
2019	Edmundo Rada	Unknown	Venezuela	Edmundo Angulo, who was nicknamed "Pipo", was a Venezuelan politician in the Sucre Municipality who disappeared on October 16, 2019, and was murdered and found dead on October 17, 2019, just one day later in Caracas.	Murdered	1 day
2019	Anesha Murnane	38	United States of America	Anesha Murnane was an American woman from Homer, Alaska, who went missing on October 17, 2019. Although she was never found, it was later revealed that she had been murdered.	Murdered	Never found
2019	Aniah Blanchard	19	United States	Blanchard, the stepdaughter of UFC fighter Walt Harris, was kidnapped from a gas station in Auburn, Alabama, on October 24, 2019. A month later, her body was found in Macon County, having been shot to death. Her suspected killer, Ibraheem Yazeed, was arrested in 2021, and in March 2026 was sentenced to two concurrent life terms. In response to this case, a law dedicated to Aniah was created to reform the bail system in the state of Alabama.	Murdered	1 month
2019	Marta Calvo	25	Spain	25-year-old Spanish woman Marta Calvo disappeared after attending a house party. Serial killer Jorge Ignacio Palma was convicted for her killing but her body has never been found.	Murdered	Never found
2019	M. Maroof Zaman	Unknown	Bangladesh	Zaman returned home on March 16, 2019. Kazi Reazul Hoque, Chairperson of the National Human Rights Commission, welcomed his return and called for accountability. Zaman's family confirmed his return but declined to provide further details, requesting privacy. A 2022 whistleblower investigation by the Sweden-based news portal Netra News suggested that Zaman had been secretly detained at ‘Aynaghar’, a clandestine facility operated by the Directorate General of Forces Intelligence.	Released from detention center	467 days

== See also ==
- List of solved missing person cases (post-2000)
