= James Nolan (criminal) =

Formerly unsolved murder victim

- Disappeared: November 30, 2010; Wellmount Clinic in Finglas
- Status: severed arm found, brother admitted to killing him
- Known for: being a criminal convicted of rape

James Nolan was an Irish criminal who was convicted of rape and false imprisonment. He disappeared and his arm was subsequently found on a beach.

== Background ==
James Nolan was from Fairlawn Park in Finglas.

=== Criminal history ===
He was convicted in 1986 of the abduction and rape of a 22-year-old woman in north Dublin. He was released in 1996, having served most of his sentence at Arbour Hill Prison.

He was jailed for burglary for 18 months in 2009. He was released on 22 November 2010.

== Disappearance ==
He was last seen at the Wellmount Clinic in Finglas, on November 30, 2010, where he collected methadone. His parents were deceased and his family had not heard from him.

=== Arm discovered ===
On 8 February 2011 a severed arm was found at Dollymount Strand. A DNA sample was sent to Interpol and was subsequently identified by British police. He had been arrested in Holyhead, Wales, in 2004 for using a forged driving licence and photograph. Fingerprints and DNA were taken at the time and stored in the UK's database. State Pathologist Marie Cassidy said that the arm had been "cleanly" severed after death and tattoos had been cut from the skin to prevent identification.

=== Confession ===
In November 2016, his brother Thomas, who was living in a flat in Carrickmacross, County Monaghan, killed himself. He left a suicide note addressed to members of his family in which he confessed to have strangled James in Glasnevin Cemetery, then dismembered his remains, leaving some in Tolka Park, Finglas, and some near Lough na Glack in County Monaghan. Gardaí considered the confession genuine.

The Gardaí started searching Tolka Valley Park at the start of April 2017 and found a mostly intact human torso buried 30 cm below the surface. In June 2017 human remains were found near Lough na Glack, County Monaghan, by the Gardaí investigating his death.

== See also ==
- List of solved missing person cases (post-2000)
