= Death of Brandon Lawson =

American disappearance case

Brandon Lawson
- 5th image on https://www.missingbrandonlawson.com/p/missing-posters.html. The license stated on the webpage includes: "We only ask that they do not be altered in any fashion and cannot be used for products sold, except newspapers and magazines. Any other use must obtain the permission of LostNMissing, Inc."
- Born: Brandon Mason Lawson; November 18, 1986; Fort Worth, Texas, U.S.
- Disappeared: August 9, 2013 (aged 26)
- Status: Found (deceased)
- Body discovered: February 4, 2022
- Occupation: Oil field worker
- Height: 5 ft 9 in (1.75 m)
- Partner: Ladessa Lofton
- Children: 4
- Parents: Bradley Lawson (father); Kimberly Lawson (mother)
- Relatives: Kyle Lawson (brother); Brittany Lawson (sister); Billy Brown (half-brother)

Brandon Mason Lawson was an American man who disappeared in the early hours of August 9, 2013, after running out of gas along a desolate stretch of Highway 277, a few miles south of Bronte, Texas.

== Disappearance ==
On August 8, 2013, Brandon Lawson arrived at his home in San Angelo, Texas, where he lived with his girlfriend of ten years, Ladessa Lofton. Between approximately 10:45 and 11:00 p.m., Lawson and Lofton argued. Lawson had not returned home the night before, and Lofton believed that Lawson was on drugs at that time. At the time, Lawson had ongoing issues with substance abuse, but had been clean for about 6 months. Lawson's brother Kyle Lawson later claimed that Brandon had taken methamphetamines shortly before his disappearance. Around 11:30 p.m., Brandon Lawson called his father in Crowley, Texas, about a three-hour drive from San Angelo, and told him he was coming to his house. At 11:54 p.m., Lawson left his house to go to his father's house, driving his Silver Ford F-150.

At about 12:30 a.m. on August 9, Lawson called Kyle and told him he had run out of gas and was pulled over on U.S. Route 277 between San Angelo and Bronte, Texas. Kyle claimed that during the call, Lawson told him that "Three (expletives) are chasing me out of town;" he later clarified it was “the Mexicans in the neighborhood." Kyle asked if he was hallucinating, which Lawson denied. Kyle, along with his wife and 4-year-old child, drove to Lofton's house and retrieved a fuel container. Kyle said they continued to make calls to each other, but Lawson wouldn't hold a conversation with him, usually ending the call after a few sentences. At 12:50 a.m., Lawson called 9-1-1, which rang at a local nursing home in Robert Lee, Texas, and he told the responder that he had run out of gas and that he needed the police. During the call, Lawson made several confused or incoherent statements, including, "Yes, I'm in the middle of a field (inaudible) pulled some guys over, right here going toward Abilene, on both sides," and "My truck ran out of gas. There's one car here. The guy's chasing (inaudible) to the woods. Please hurry!" Several minutes later, at 12:56 a.m., a trucker called 9-1-1 to report Lawson's truck, which was parked in a hazardous manner on the road.

Between 12:50 a.m. and 1:15 a.m., Lawson received and made several calls with his brother, his girlfriend, his neighbor, and the 9-1-1 dispatcher. However, his poor cell phone reception caused several of these calls to go straight to voicemail; after 1:19 a.m., all calls to his phone went straight to voicemail. At around 1:18 a.m., Kyle called Lawson, who sounded out of breath and claimed he was bleeding. Shortly after 1 a.m., a sheriff's deputy arrived at Lawson's truck, though Lawson was not there. Kyle arrived at the truck around 1:10 a.m. At the time, he was on the phone with Lawson, who told him "I can see you; I'm right here," but neither the deputy nor Kyle could see him. At the time of the disappearance, Lawson had an active arrest warrant on him, and Kyle thought that he may have been hiding from the deputy. After talking to the officer, Kyle drove a short distance up the road and parked the car to wait for Lawson to appear; however, he left after waiting for about 30 to 45 minutes. Kyle left the gas can in the back of Lawson's truck and later returned to the truck around 5 a.m., where he was surprised that Lawson had not returned. Around 8 a.m., the truck was towed.

== Aftermath and discovery ==
In the aftermath of his disappearance, a local deputy organized a search party and spent several hours investigating the area near Lawson's truck; the party found no signs of Lawson. Friends and family of Lawson set up a Facebook page called "Help Find Brandon Lawson;" as of 2025, the group had over 29,000 followers.

On February 4, 2022, Lawson's family reported on the "Help Find Brandon Lawson" Facebook page that a search party had located clothing identified as Lawson's near his last known location and that the Texas Rangers had subsequently conducted a search of the area and found human remains.

On December 25, 2024, Brandon’s girlfriend Ladessa posted on the "Help Find Brandon Lawson" Facebook page that the DNA results had finally returned a positive result for Brandon Lawson, confirming his death. The exact cause of his death, however, remains unknown.

== See also ==
- List of solved missing person cases (2010s)
