= Death of Akbar Salubiro =

2017 snake attack in Indonesia

Akbar Salubiro
- Born: 1991
- Disappeared: March 25, 2017; Mamuju, West Sulawesi, Indonesia
- Died: March 27, 2017 (aged 25); Sulawesi, Indonesia
- Known for: Being swallowed whole by a python
- Spouse: Munu Salubiro

Akbar Salubiro was a 25-year-old man who went missing on March 25, 2017, after setting off for harvest in a remote village on the western part of the island of Sulawesi, Indonesia. Salubiro's remains were found two days later inside the body of a reticulated python.

== Disappearance and discovery of body ==
The morning after Salubiro was reported missing, a search party was sent out, and his family became worried and called the police. Later that day, the snake that had eaten Salubiro slithered into Salubiro's backyard near an oil palm plantation. People saw that it had difficulty moving due to its large belly, an official stated. Residents then cut open the belly of the snake and found Salubiro dead inside. People said they heard cries from the palm grove the night before Salubiro was found eaten by the snake.

== Aftermath ==
The death of Akbar Salubiro was the first fully confirmed case of a reticulated python (or any snake) killing and consuming an adult human, as the process of retrieving the body from the python's stomach was documented by pictures and videos taken by witnesses.

== Similar cases ==
On June 14, 2018, a 54-year-old woman named Wa Tiba, also of Sulawesi, was also eaten by a reticulated python that had slithered into her garden at her home.

In 2022 another 54-year old missing Sumatran woman from Jambi named Jahrah was found inside a python, making this the third fully documented swallowing of an adult human.

On 7 June 2024, the fourth confirmed case of full consumption appeared after a 45-year old woman named Farida was found to have been devoured by a reticulated python in South Sulawesi. Three weeks later, in July 2024, another 36-year old woman named Siriati was discovered inside a python's stomach in South Sulawesi.

In July 2025, a 63-year-old man named La Noti, was eaten by a reticulated python while feeding his livestock in Southeast Sulawesi.

== See also ==
- List of largest snakes
- List of solved missing person cases (2010s)
- Man-eating animal
