= Nicolasa Quintremán =

- Born: December 4, 1939; Alto Biobío, Chile
- Died: December 24, 2013 (aged 74)
- Occupation: Activist
- Known for: Opposition to the construction of the Ralco Hydroelectric Plant

Nicolasa Quintremán Calpán (December 4, 1939 – December 24, 2013) was a Chilean Pehuenche activist from the community of Ralco Lepoy in the commune of Alto Biobío. Together with her older sister Berta, she was known nationally and internationally for her fierce opposition to the construction of Endesa's Ralco Hydroelectric Plant. As part of the organization Mapu Domuche Newén (Mapuche language) (Women with the strength of the land) her actions marked the beginning of social struggles in the face of the environmental and social impact that large initiatives of this type can generate in the country.

== Biography ==
Nicolasa Quintremán Calpán was born in Alto Biobío, Chile, December 4, 1939. She belonged to the Pehuenche community of Ralco Lepoy, where she was one of the architects of several demonstrations in Santiago and Concepción against the power plant, and participated in several international forums where she explained the implications of the project for the Pehuenche of Alto Biobío, such as the one organized at the Human Rights Commission of the European Parliament. In addition, she filed a lawsuit against the company and the National Environmental Commission.

On December 24, 2013, Quintremán's body was found floating in the murky waters of the artificial reservoir of the Ralco dam, the same one for which she achieved public notoriety by tenaciously opposing its construction. Although the Forensic Medical Service stated that Quintremán died from drowning as a result of an accidental fall, for many, the accident thesis left room for doubt.

== Awards and honours ==
In 2000, along with her sister, Quintremán received the Petra Kelly Prize in Germany:—

"in honor of their non-violent resistance, courage and commitment to these two women who were emblematic of the struggle against mega dams".

== See also ==
- List of solved missing person cases (2010s)
