= 2011 Timbuktu kidnapping =

2011 kidnapping by Al-Qaeda

Stephen McGown, Johan Gustafsson, Sjaak Rijke
- Born: South Africa (McGown); Sweden (Gustafsson); Netherlands (Rijke)
- Known for: Being kidnapped by AQIM militants

Timbuktu three refers to three abductees, South African Stephen Malcolm McGown, Swede Johan Gustafsson, and Dutchman Sjaak Rijke, who were all kidnapped on 25 November 2011. A fourth German victim Martin Arker, was shot and killed when he refused to climb into the kidnappers' truck.

A unit of the Al-Qaeda's North African branch, al-Qaeda in the Islamic Maghreb (AQIM) abducted the three from a residence shortly after eating lunch at a restaurant in Timbuktu, Mali. Because McGown has dual citizenship, South African and British, the group offered a trade to the British Government for Abu Qatada who was to be deported from the UK to Jordan, where he had been convicted of involvement in militant plots.

Following the kidnapping, several videos were released of the three, offered as proof of life.

Rijke was rescued by French forces in April 2015. Gustafsson was released in June 2017, and McGown was released in July 2017.

== Sjaak Rijke ==
Sjaak Rijke (Dutch pronunciation: [ɕaːk ˈrɛikə]) is a Dutch national who has been held hostage by a faction of Al Qaeda in the Maghreb region in Mali since 25 November 2011 with Stephen Malcolm McGown from South Africa and Johan Gustafsson from Sweden. He was liberated by French special forces in the north of Mali on 6 April 2015.

== Abduction ==
Rijke, who worked as a train driver in his native country of the Netherlands, was taken hostage in Timbuktu in northern Mali on 25 November 2011, together with McGown and Gustafsson. They were all in Mali as tourists, despite the recent unrest and insurgencies in the region. Rijke's wife managed to escape the attack by hiding from the perpetrators. A German tourist who refused to cooperate with the attackers was killed at the scene. Rijke, McGown, and Gustafsson were subsequently taken to an undisclosed hiding place.

After his hostage-taking, the Government of the Netherlands issued negative travel advice for the northern part of Mali.

== Aftermath ==
In a video posted on YouTube on 12 July 2012, Rijke said he had been captured by Al Qaeda and that he was treated well.

One month later, in August 2012, Arabic TV news broadcaster Al Jazeera broadcast a report in which Rijke and the other two hostages were featured, urging their respective governments to negotiate with Al Qaeda for their release.

In September 2013, almost two years after the kidnapping, AQIM released a video in which Rijke called upon the Dutch government "not to forget about him". The video was probably recorded in June 2013. It was the first sign of Rijke or any of the other hostages since French military actions in Mali in January 2013, when Islamist radicals had threatened to capture Mali's capital Bamako.

On 21 August 2014, on social media, the case of Sjaak Rijke caught slight attention with the hashtag #FreeSjaak, commemorating 1000 days of captivity.

In November 2014, AQIM released another video in which Rijke addresses the Dutch government and his family. He says he is in pain and in a difficult security situation and asks in an emotional way to please help him. The video was made on 26 September 2014, according to Rijke.

Rijke ultimately survived the kidnapping, having been rescued by soldiers of the BFST in April 2015.

In late June 2017, Gustafsson was released and flown to Sweden. No details about the negotiations were made public at the time.

In late July 2017, McGown was released and returned to South Africa. South African officials refused to comment on the terms of the negotiations, but The New York Times reported that the South African government paid €3.5 million (about $4.2 million) to McGown's captors using South African charity Gift of the Givers as an intermediary.

BBC resumed experiences of Steven McGowns as a story. He found back to life as a keynote speaker.

== See also ==
- List of kidnappings
- List of solved missing person cases (2010s)
