= Death of Stephen Corrigan =

Death of Irish man

Stephen Corrigan
- Born: June 8, 1963; Ireland
- Died: after November 22, 2011; Rathmines, Dublin, Ireland
- Known for: Previously unidentified John Doe

Stephen Corrigan was an Irish man whose partial skeletal remains were found in Rathmines, Dublin on 9 April 2020.

== Discovery ==
His remains were found on 9 April 2020 on a tree-lined common area close to apartments in the Lissenfield development off Lower Rathmines Road. No clothing remained on the skeletal remains and there was no apparent attempt to bury them.

== Investigation ==
A forensic anthropologist and members of the Garda Technical Bureau examined the remains and the site. The remains were moved to Dublin City Mortuary for forensic examination.

A postmortem examination was completed on the remains on 21 April 2020 and it did not point towards homicide. As the remains are partial a definitive cause of death could not be determined. DNA tests were performed and cross-referenced with missing persons, but as of 27 April 2020 there had been no matches.

The remains were to remain at Dublin City Mortuary until identified.

== Identification ==
On 22 June 2020 a Garda Press spokeswoman said that the remains had been positively identified and that the Gardaí were continuing to try to contact family members.

On 7 July 2020 it was announced that the remains were positively identified as those of Stephen Corrigan, a man who had been missing since November 2011.

Following the nationwide appeal to find family of the late Stephen Corrigan, Finders International successfully traced living relatives. Fr. Brendan Corrigan, a first cousin of the deceased man's mother has been located in County Westmeath.

Although he had met Stephen's grandfather George many years previously, he had not met Stephen himself. Stephen was born in 1963 to a single mother, Hanna (or Anna) Corrigan. Hanna died in 2015 aged 81 and Stephen's only sibling, Edward, who was six years younger than Stephen, died in 2016 aged 46. Hanna, born in 1934, was an only child of George Corrigan and Johanna Newman. George and Johanna married in Dublin in 1932.

George Corrigan, Stephen's grandfather, was one of 12 siblings - John, Mary, Sarah, Thomas, Joseph, Anne, Norah, Nicholas, Michael, Hubert and Francis. Francis Corrigan, Stephen's granduncle married Kathleen O’Brien and they had five children, all of whom would be cousins of Stephen's mother. Brendan is one of these children. Brendan studied in Maynooth and is now the parish priest in Kilbeggan. Brendan, a first cousin of Stephen's mother, Hanna, is Stephen's first cousin once removed.

Hayley Seager of Finders International, Dublin, said: “The relatives we found immediately are mostly on Stephen’s maternal grandfather’s side of the family. The Corrigan family tree is pretty extensive. We also know that most of the Stephen’s grandfather’s family emigrated to the UK, with grandfather George and granduncle Michael Corrigan both working for Ford in Dagenham.”

== Background, disappearance, and aftermath ==
Stephen Corrigan was born on 8 June 1963 and was missing since 22 November 2011. He had been living in the Cork Street area of Dublin when he was last seen alive. He had been a patient at the Weir Home on Cork Street, where nursing and psychiatric care are provided for men. Residents can come and go and he failed to return there on the day he went missing.

He suffered from mental health issues and tended to withdraw from society. At these times he was known to live on the streets around Saint Anne's Park, Palmerston Park, Mulhuddart and Glasnevin.

His mother kept in contact with Gardaí and provided a blood sample for identification. Crimecall broadcast appeals for information on his whereabouts on three occasions.

His remains were identified through DNA comparison with the blood sample given by his mother.

His mother had died before his remains were found as had his only other known blood relative. Gardaí believe that he died not long after he was last seen alive. Gardaí appealed in July 2020 for any other relatives or anyone with information on his family to contact Rathmines Garda station.

== See also ==
- List of solved missing person cases (2010s)
- List of unsolved deaths
