= Killing of Hailey Dunn =

Child murder in the United States

Hailey Dunn
- Born: Hailey Darlene Dunn; August 28, 1997; Texas
- Disappeared: December 27, 2010 (age 13); Colorado City, Texas
- Status: Found dead in March 2013
- Known for: Disappearance, being found dead and murder
- Parents: Clint Dunn (father); Billie Jean Dunn (mother)

Hailey Darlene Dunn (August 28, 1997 – 2010) was an American thirteen year old girl who disappeared from Colorado City, Texas, on December 27, 2010.

As of March 30, 2011, police had reported that they believed that Dunn was dead and would mostly be looking for her remains.

== Disappearance and discovery of remains ==
At the time she went missing, Hailey Dunn lived with her brother, David Dunn, 16 years old at the time, her mother, Billie Jean Dunn, and her mother's boyfriend, Shawn Adkins in Colorado City, Texas. She was a student and a cheerleader at Colorado City Middle School. Dunn was last seen at school on December 27, 2010. Shawn Adkins was the last person who saw Hailey, after she came home from school, around 3pm. Adkins said Hailey told him she was going to visit her dad, Clint Dunn, who lived nearby and spend the night at her friend, Mary Beth's.

Hailey never went to visit her dad. Mary Beth's mother said that Hailey and her daughter had no plans that night and she did not know Hailey was intending on coming over to her house at all. Billie Dunn reported Hailey missing the next day, December 28, 2010. A skeleton was found two years later, in March 2013. These remains were confirmed to be that of Dunn.

== Investigation and aftermath ==
It is said that Dunn was killed by being struck in the head with an object. Shawn Adkins was charged with killing her, but he was released due to what court documents said was "a need for further investigation" and the murder remains unsolved.

== See also ==
- List of solved missing person cases (2010s)
- List of unsolved murders (2000–present)
