= Deaths of Tala and Rotana Farea =

2018 suicide of Saudi Arabian sisters

Tala Farea
- Born: 2002; Saudi Arabia
- Died: 2018 (aged 15–16); New York City, U.S.
- Cause of death: Suicide (officially)
- Body discovered: October 24, 2018
- Known for: Suicide pact with her sister

Rotana Farea
- Born: 1995; Saudi Arabia
- Died: 2018 (aged 22–23); New York City, U.S.
- Cause of death: Suicide (officially)
- Body discovered: October 24, 2018
- Known for: Suicide pact with her sister

On October 24, 2018, the bodies of 16 year old Tala and 23 year old Rotana Farea were found along rocky banks of the Hudson River. The bodies were bound with duct tape and the NYPD concluded there had been no foul play. Police determined that their deaths were part of a suicide pact. Both of the sisters were last seen by their family in Virginia on November 30, 2017. Before disappearing, the sisters lived in a "shelter-like" facility due to abuse allegations in their district. A witness claimed he saw the two sisters praying 30 feet (9.1 m) from each other in a park at West 158th Street in Upper Manhattan on the morning of October 24.

The sisters had been missing from their home for several weeks.

The medical examiner ruled that the sisters killed themselves.

== Connection to Saudi Arabia ==
New York Police have sources that the sisters would "Rather kill themselves than return to Saudi Arabia". The sisters' mother told local media that the Saudi embassy in Washington had ordered the family to leave the U.S. But Saudi Arabia refuted that stating, "Reports that we ordered anyone related to the Saudi sisters, Tala and Rotana Farea, God rest their souls, (who recently died tragically in NY), to leave the US for seeking asylum; are absolutely false. Details are still under investigation and will be shared in due course."

== See also ==
- Lists of solved missing person cases
