= Ramon Berloso =

Italian serial killer

- Born: 1975; Farra d'Isonzo, Friuli-Venezia Giulia, Italy
- Died: 20 August 2010 (aged 35); Udine, Friuli-Venezia Giulia, Italy
- Cause of death: Suicide by hanging
- Other name: "The Crossbow Killer"
- Conviction: Manslaughter
- Penalty: 6 years and 8 months

Details
- Victims: 3
- Span of crimes: 1993–2010
- Country: Italy
- State: Friuli-Venezia Giulia
- Date apprehended: 19 July 2010

Ramon Berloso (1975 – 20 August 2010), known as The Crossbow Killer (Italian: Il Killer della Balestra), was an Italian serial killer who killed two prostitutes in Udine (northeastern Italy), between March and May 2010, a few years after being released from prison for a prior manslaughter conviction. He confessed to both killings after his arrest but killed himself before his trial could begin.

== Early life ==
Little is known about Berloso's early life. Born in 1975 in the comune of Farra d'Isonzo in the Province of Gorizia, he was the only son of a local couple who were well-respected by their neighbors. Berloso experienced no known instances of neglect or abuse during his youth, but was described as a shy child who mostly kept to himself and indulged in his passion for motocross, frequently visiting the Motor Expo Racing track.

== Crimes ==
=== Death of Alessandro Paglavech ===
On 24 October 1993, the 17-year-old Berloso signed up to participate in a motocross race near Farra d'Isonzo, but instead wound up in an argument with an 18-year-old boy named Alessandro Paglavech. Wanting to teach him a lesson, he offered for them to have a brawl in a nearby cornfield. The exact circumstances of the fight are unclear, but according to Berloso, he punched Paglavech harder than he expected, causing the man to fall into a puddle of mud and suffocate to death.

Initially, Berloso tried to pin the blame for the death on two other men, Massimiliano Spangher and Roberto Ventura, claiming that he had seen them beat up Paglavech. He later retracted these claims and admitted responsibility for the crime, due to which he was convicted on a manslaughter charge and sentenced to 6 years and 8 months imprisonment. He was incarcerated at the Marca Juvenile Prison while serving this sentence, and according to an ex-girlfriend, he became more cold, shy and grumpy towards her, leading to her breaking up with him.

=== Release ===
After serving his sentence in full, Berloso was released and moved in with his mother at her new home in Aiello del Friuli. Over the following years, he found employment as a gardener and married a Brazilian he had met in Milan named Eloa Janes de Macero, with whom he had one daughter, Vittoria. The couple eventually separated due to mutual disagreements, and on at least one occasion, his ex-wife accused him of kidnapping their daughter; no charges were filed in this instance, as authorities determined it did not constitute a kidnapping due to the fact they had joint custody.

In general, Berloso was not known to cause problems to his acquaintances and neighbors, but some noted that he always appeared to be gloomy and taciturn. His mother would later claim that his separation from his wife caused him to suffer from depression, made even worse when he accidentally discovered his father's body on the floor of their house in 2008. He had died of natural causes, but the sight apparently greatly affected the younger Berloso, who said that it had a lasting impact on his psyche.

=== "Crossbow Killer" murders ===
Berloso began to solicit prostitutes and escorts in early 2010. He first contacted 28-year-old Ilenia Vecchiato, a part-time beautician based in Bologna who also offered sexual services, sometime in early March. After picking her up, he drove to a villa owned by an elderly couple he had previously worked for and offered to have sex there, as it was currently uninhabited. When they got there, however, Berloso instead hit Vecchiato on the head with an iron bar and then shot her in the head with a crossbow dart. After stealing €10,000 (equivalent to about US$13,300 at the time and $19,600 currently), her mobile phone and credit card, Berloso buried her body on a riverbank near Tapogliano. Vecchiato's parents reported her missing on 10 March, but local police were unable to locate her at the time.

On 5 May, Berloso arranged a meeting with 24-year-old Diana Alexiu, a high-class escort from Constanța, Romania, who had recently relocated to Desenzano del Garda after an incident with a previous client. After picking her up from a toll booth at the motorway, he drove in the direction of the villa, but along the way, Alexiu became suspicious and tried to stall for time. When this failed, she threw herself out of the moving car, but was injured and unable to escape. Berloso caught up with her, took out the crossbow from the trunk of the car and shot her once in the stomach. According to his later confessions, he watched as Alexiu begged him to drive her to the hospital, supposedly almost convincing him in the end, but she succumbed to her injuries before that could happen. He then transported the body to the riverbank and buried it next to Vecchiato's, before abandoning the car he was using at a train station in Cervignano del Friuli.

== Investigation and arrest ==
Unbeknownst to Berloso, investigators had been monitoring the devices and credit cards of the two victims, leading them to realize that he had been using Vecchiato's car and mobile phone to arrange a meeting with another prostitute. Due to this, a team of carabinieri were dispatched to arrest him. Berloso apparently realized this and fled his home, instead going to the home of Giorgio Saccon, a priest and friend of the family who lived in Treviso, to whom he had originally confessed that he had killed Paglavech back in 1993. After consulting with Saccon, Berloso was convinced to turn himself in to the authorities and soon surrendered in Padua.

=== Confessions and suicide ===
After being transferred to the police station in Udine, Berloso readily confessed to both murders and pointed out where he had buried the bodies, as well as where he had abandoned the crossbow used in both killings. When pressed for a motive, he claimed that he was desperate for money and decided to rob high-class prostitutes and escorts. Berloso also claimed that he knew that the police were going to catch up with him eventually, due to which he had contemplated fleeing to Brazil, where a friend of his lived.

After his confessions, Berloso was transferred to the Udine Prison to await charges. On the evening of 5 August, a guard patrolling the prison came across Berloso attempting to hang himself using sheets tied to the window grilles. Medical staff were immediately notified and rushed him to the medical wing, where he was declared to be comatose due to the effects of cerebral hypoxia. An inspection of his cell in the following morning led to the discovery of three hand-written letters: one addressed to his daughter, another to his mother, and the last (written in Portuguese) to his female friend, but no suicide note.

Berloso was kept on life support for fifteen days, until he was declared legally brain dead. As a result, his life support was turned off, with him dying shortly afterwards. Not long after his death was revealed to the public, Berloso's mother said in an interview that she planned to give him a private funeral attended only by closest relatives and that she would soon move away from Aiello del Friulli, as the house would now forever be stigmatized as the home of a killer.

== See also ==
- List of serial killers by country
