= Disappearance of Bruno Borges =

2017 disappearance case in Brazil

On March 27, 2017, Bruno de Melo Silva Borges, a Brazilian student, disappeared after leaving his home in Rio Branco, Acre. In his bedroom, Borges left several encrypted messages, 14 handwritten books, and a statue of philosopher Giordano Bruno. The Civil Police of Acre investigated the case and Interpol was called. Borges's disappearance received wide coverage on the Internet, generating memes and online investigations. During the investigation, it was revealed Borges had the help of two friends and a cousin to carry out the project, and that he had signed a contract allocating part of the proceeds of the sale of his books to his three helpers.

At dawn on August 11 the same year, Borges returned to his house barefoot, debilitated, and dehydrated. Soon after, he began working on corrections for his book TAC – Teoria da Absorção do Conhecimento (lit. Knowledge Absorption Theory), which had received negative reviews. Borges told police chief Alcino Júnior he "disappeared of his own free will and that he was not coerced by any external force". He did not reveal his hiding place. By September 26, Borges had gained 13 kg (29 lb) and said he was surprised by the reactions to his project. Two days later, Borges opened his room, which he considered a "work of art", for visitors.

Since the discovery of the contracts, there have been several accusations the case was a scheme to promote Borges's books. The Civil Police of Acre and the state's Public Security Advisory stated the disappearance was most likely a marketing scheme, which Borges and his mother denied. According to Borges, the main intention of his project was "to encourage people to acquire knowledge" and the accusations were made by sensationalist media. Borges's friend sued Borges, accusing him of not handing over the books' proceeds as contracted.

== Background and before disappearance story ==
Bruno de Melo Silva Borges enjoyed reading in his adolescence, preferring "denser" readings. He studied administration, law, and psychology, but did not finish his courses. He later became interested in philosophy.

Borges told his mother he needed money for a project, but she refused when he failed to elaborate on the details of said project. Borges's cousin Eduardo Veloso, however, transferred 20,000 reais to Borges because he believed in this project. Borges said he "[would] be writing 14 books that would change humanity in a good way". He began writing these books in 2013 and completed some of them in 2016. To finish his project, Borges asked his mother if he could spend a year without working and, guided by a doctor, she allowed it.

On March 1, 2017, Borges's parents went on holiday, by which time he had written five books and wanted to publish one of them. Borges remained at home in Rio Branco with his twin brother and older sister. He locked himself in his room for 24 days, leaving only to eat. On March 24, Borges was at the house of his neighbor Maria do Socorro; he told her he was finishing the books and that he wanted to help her and others in need.

On March 27, Borges's parents returned from their trip and had lunch with the family. Later, his father left Borges at the corner of his house. Bruno Borges then left on foot without documents or money, but with his backpack and computer's hard drive. After walking for over 1 km (0.62 miles), he arrived at a taxi stand, from which he took a taxi to a motel. The journey lasted 15 minutes, during which Borges received a call and was anxious to reach his destination. The motel staff said Borges had not been there; it is believed he went to a forest behind the motel, where "secret rituals" took place. A seamstress reported Borges and a friend ordered three tunics.

Before his return, Borges had been last seen on March 28, 2017, at 2:29 p.m., captured by a security camera running towards his home. On the same day, news portal G1 published the news of Borges's disappearance. Borges's father reported in the article his son had been missing since 2:00 p.m. the day before; he tried to call his son's cellphone but it was turned off, and reported Borges had never disappeared before.

== Investigation ==
Borges's disappearance was investigated by the Civil Police of the State of Acre. Chief Fabrizzio Sobreira, coordinator of the Criminal Investigation Precinct (DIC), said on March 29 on Jornal Acre TV all the hypotheses were being considered. In early April, Borges's father said that, worried about his son's disappearance, he decided to enter his son's room, which was always locked. There were encrypted messages everywhere in the room. There was no furniture but a 2-meter (6.6 ft) tall statue of philosopher Giordano Bruno, whom Borges admired, worth R$7,000. Jorge Rivasplata, the statue's sculptor, said he believed Borges is the philosopher's reincarnation. Internet users noted the physical similarity between Borges and Giordano, as well as their names. Some speculated Borges "may be trying to finish the philosopher's works, work interrupted by his death by the Roman Inquisition".

In his room, Borges also left 14 handwritten books, some copied on the walls, ceiling and floor. All of the works were encrypted and identified by Roman numerals. Eight of the books were left on top of his workbench. According to G1, "In the bedroom, the writings are done impeccably, with precision and symmetry, like on a notebook page". Only in a small part of the room were non-encrypted texts, in Portuguese, containing quotes from writers, philosophers, and the Bible. In addition, symbols were drawn on the walls and around the statue. On the wall, there was also a painting depicting Borges being touched by an extraterrestrial being. To help decipher the codes, Borges left keys in a visible place. These keys were taken from the Mirim Scout Manual.

On April 8, the police said they were investigating the possibility Borges had left Acre. Video surveillance was used in the investigation. It was also revealed friends who helped Borges with the code had made a confidentiality pact not to reveal any more information about the project. Fabrizzio Sobreira reported Borges's core of friends was reduced. One of those friends said Borges had told him about "the desire to be isolated and live in a cave" and that Borges had fasted for 12 days while working on the writings.

On April 12, it was reported the family had identified five codes and that two books had started to be decoded on April 8. Six days later, Interpol were called. Although there was no evidence Borges had left Brazil, the possibility was not ruled out. On April 19, a childhood friend of Borges made some reports to G1. He helped decode one of Borges's books and also reported Borges was talking about astral projection, and had said he had been given a "mission" to write the 14 books. Borges had approached a doctor and family friend to help with the project; the doctor believed Borges had been helped by spirits and was a medium.

=== Contracts and discovery of furniture ===
On May 31, the Civil Police arrested a friend of Borges for giving false testimony. (Note: The friend's lawyer said the friend was not arrested but only sent to the police station as a witness.) Chief Alcino Júnior said he was serving a search and seizure warrant at the friend's house, where he found contracts left by Borges allocating part of the sale of coded books to this friend, one other friend and Borges's cousin. The police also found the furniture from Borges's room in the friend's house. On the friend's cell phone, police found messages to another friend saying they would "be rich" with the disclosure of Borges's coded books. According to Borges's mother, she already knew about the contracts and that the furniture was in the friend's house. Borges's friend was released that night.

After the friend's testimonies and the discovery of the contracts, the Civil Police of Acre stated on June 1 it would no longer treat the case as a crime, saying, "We are no longer responsible for this case ... we are interested in finding him, but it becomes a secondary thing. We will continue to assist as necessary." The next day, Borges's friend said he had kept the relocation of the furniture private at Borges's request. According to delegate Alcino Júnior, the investigation into the theft and perjury would be closed by June 7. As of June 28, the inquiry had not yet been forwarded.

== Book publication ==
On June 18, Borges's family closed an agreement to publish his books, the first being TAC – Teoria da Absorção do Conhecimento (lit. Knowledge Absorption Theory), in e-book and physical formats, with release scheduled for July 5 or 7. Large publishers were interested in buying the encrypted content, but Borges's father said he realized "their business was simply money". The introduction of Borges's first book was released on July 5. One literary coach said 15,000 readers downloaded the introduction that day. Pre-sales were scheduled to open on July 7. TAC was released on July 20. In the week of July 24 to 30, it was the 20th-best-selling book in the nonfiction category. The book received negative reviews, especially regarding poor writing quality and Borges's weak argumentation.

== Internet and social media ==
Bruno Borges's case went viral on social media after a video of his bedroom, recorded without the family's permission, was released online. On the Internet, Borges started to be called Menino do Acre ("Boy from Acre"), which became an Internet meme and was part of the Brazilian trending topics on Twitter. The disappearance inspired mobile phone games such as Menino do Acre, Encontre o Menino do Acre, and Alquimistas do Acre. Investigations also began to take place on the Internet. Two people from Goiás used photographs of Borges's room posted on the Internet to decipher codes that were not in the key left by Borges. One of them, working in the area of encryption, became interested in the subject and broke the code in 30 minutes. The pair created a collaborative website with an online virtual keyboard to type the symbols of the images, converting them into letters. According to them, 70,000 people visited the site in one day. On April 4, the group "Bruno Borges – Estudos" was created on Facebook to try to decode the messages. Ten days later, the group had 10,400 participants.

== Return ==
On August 11, five months after his disappearance, Bruno Borges returned to his home. He arrived barefoot at 5:22 p.m. His doorbell ringing went unanswered, and Borges had to wait for over an hour before a neighbor appeared to call Borges's father, who came to the door. The second house he visited was that of his neighbor, who said Borges "was weak and barefoot". That same day, Chief Alcino Júnior said Borges would not incur criminal charges and that the family should not be held responsible either. On the Internet, the return inspired more memes and the term "Acre" became a trending topic on Brazilian Twitter. Borges's mother posted on her Facebook that Borges's return was a miracle granted by Nossa Senhora da Conceição Aparecida. Borges did not reveal where he had hidden. Soon after returning home, Borges began to correct the book TAC, saying it had been published with excerpts incorrectly translated. On August 15, Borges told police chief Alcino Júnior he "disappeared of his own free will and that he was not coerced by any external force".

On September 26, Borges received the G1 team at his home. Since his return to that date, his weight increased from 51 kg (112 lb) to 64 kg (141 lb). He reported he returned dehydrated and needed to resort to serum. About reactions to the case and his book, he said:

As I had no contact with anything and I always had great faith in this project, I expected the reaction to be different. Although, in my own studies, I say that those who innovate tend to have a somewhat hostile reaction, but I wasn't prepared and I was a little surprised by the reactions, because my intentions were good.

Two days later, Borges, considering his room a work of art, opened it for visitors. He also said he had enough material for twenty new books. On January 9, 2018, one of Borges's friends sued him, saying he received no money from the books' profits as established in the contract. Three days later, Borges sent messages to his father, saying he was wrong to sell TAC. He said; "You are going to say that you are going to publish all my works for free, and that everything I write will be free for the rest of my life". On February 27, the plaintiff filed for Borges's bank statements.

In August 2019, Borges again opened the room for guided tours.

=== Marketing scheme accusations ===
Since the discovery of the contracts on May 31, Borges has faced accusations of using his disappearance as a publicity stunt to promote his books. The Civil Police of Acre said the following day that, in addition to no longer treating the case as a crime, there were "strong indications" the disappearance was a marketing ploy to boost sales of his books. Borges's mother denied the accusations, saying, "This is not a marketing ploy. I already knew about the contracts. Those boys helped Bruno. What's the problem with him making a contract to help friends who helped him?"

After Borges's return on August 11, the Public Security Advisory in Acre closed the case as an example of "planned marketing". On the Internet, some people said the police should arrest Borges for unnecessarily mobilizing the police, and others supported his mother. Borges said the accusations were false, that his main goal with the project was "to encourage people to acquire knowledge", and that he isolated himself to "find the truth" within himself. On his official website, Borges says:

The sensationalist media, which is increasingly losing its credibility by reporting stories by creating something offensive in search of a large audience, conveyed the idea that the author had a whole plan to get rich and famous with philosophy books, and, through these false accusations, the author showed in court that the gains from his project were minimal, not even offsetting the cost of its development.

== See also ==
- List of solved missing person cases (post-2000)
