= 2017 Bucks County murders =

Murder spree in Pennsylvania, U.S.

- Top row: Meo and Finocchiaro; Bottom row: Patrick and Sturgis
- Location: Bucks County, Pennsylvania, U.S.
- Date: July 5–7, 2017
- Attack type: Shooting, murder
- Deaths: 4
- Victims: Dean A. Finocchiaro, age 19; Thomas C. Meo, age 21; Jimi T. Patrick, age 19; Mark R. Sturgis, age 22
- Perpetrators: Cosmo DiNardo; Sean Michael Kratz

Between July 5 and July 7, 2017, four young men were reported missing in Bucks County, Pennsylvania, United States. All were subsequently found murdered. The victims were Thomas C. Meo, age 21; Dean A. Finocchiaro, age 19; Jimi T. Patrick, age 19; and Mark R. Sturgis, age 22.

The murders were carried out by Cosmo DiNardo and Sean Michael Kratz, both age 20 at the time of the murders. The four victims were murdered in three separate incidents, each after DiNardo arranged to sell them cannabis.

== Murder victims ==
The disappearances began on July 5, 2017, with Patrick being the first of the men to vanish. Two days later, on July 7, Meo, Finocchiaro, and Sturgis were also reported missing. Each of the four men was reported to be murdered the same day he went missing.

- Jimi Taro Patrick (1998–2017), a rising sophomore majoring in business at Loyola University Maryland, was last seen around 6:00 PM on July 5 in Newtown, Pennsylvania. He failed to show up for work the next day. Patrick met DiNardo that night to buy four pounds (1.8 kg) of marijuana, at which time DiNardo shot him and then used a backhoe to bury his body.
- Dean A. Finocchiaro (1997–2017) was last seen around 6:30 PM on July 7 being picked up by an unidentified person, possibly DiNardo or Kratz. His remains were found on July 12, 2017, in a common grave on a Solebury Township farm (owned by DiNardo's parents), along with the remains of Mark Sturgis and Thomas Meo. Finocchiaro's body was the first to be identified. Finocchiaro and DiNardo had a good relationship, with DiNardo saying that they were like cousins. As with Patrick, Finocchiaro had agreed to buy marijuana from DiNardo. This was the first murder in which Kratz was involved; the two men both repeatedly shot Finocchiaro. His body was placed in a metal oil tank that had been converted to a pork roaster.
- Mark R. Sturgis (1994–2017) went to meet his friend Thomas C. Meo (January 30, 1996 – July 7, 2017) at around 6:00 PM on July 7. Both men worked for Sturgis' father's construction company. The two did not show up for work and calls to their cellphones went directly to voice mail. DiNardo met with Sturgis and Meo at a church to sell Meo marijuana. Meo and Sturgis were both shot as they exited their truck. When he ran out of ammunition, DiNardo drove over the still-alive Meo with a backhoe, then placed both bodies in a metal tank that also held Finocchiaro's body. DiNardo attempted unsuccessfully to burn the bodies using gasoline. He used the backhoe to bury the tank containing the three bodies.

DiNardo, a drug dealer, confessed to killing the four men; he said he did so because he felt cheated or threatened during drug transactions. He also told investigators where to find Jimi Patrick's body, buried in another grave on the property. The only motive disclosed by investigators was that DiNardo said he wanted to set the victims up when they came to the farm to buy marijuana.

== Investigation ==
On the afternoon of July 8, authorities tracked Finocchiaro's cell phone to a 90-acre (36-hectare) farm in the Solebury Township owned by DiNardo's parents, Antonio and Sandra DiNardo, who also own a cement and construction company.

While being investigated for the four July 2017 Pennsylvania murders, DiNardo also claimed to be responsible for at least two other killings in the previous five years in Philadelphia. Investigators have yet to verify these claims.

== Arrests ==
Cosmo DiNardo
- 2026 Mug shot of Cosmo DiNardo
- Born: January 21, 1997 (age 29); Bensalem, Pennsylvania, U.S.
- Criminal charges: Homicide, conspiracy to commit homicide, abuse of corpse, robbery, possession of instruments of crime

Sean Michael Kratz
- Born: February 14, 1997 (age 29); Bensalem, Pennsylvania, U.S.
- Criminal charges: Homicide, conspiracy to commit homicide, abuse of corpse, robbery, possession of instruments of crime

Second cousins Cosmo DiNardo (born January 21, 1997) and Sean Michael Kratz (born February 14, 1997), both age 20, were charged in the murders.

On July 10, DiNardo was arrested for an unrelated weapons charge. Despite 30 run-ins with local police, DiNardo, the son of a wealthy businessman, had never been convicted of a crime. DiNardo was later released after his father posted 10% of the $1 million bail.

On July 12, DiNardo was arrested and charged for stealing and attempting to sell a car that belonged to Thomas Meo for $500. Suspicion was also raised by due to Meo having left his insulin in the car, something his family said would have been unusual for him to do. His bail was set at $5 million. The next day, DiNardo confessed to the murder of the four men. In exchange for his confession, prosecutors stated that they would not seek the death penalty.

The day after his confession, DiNardo was charged with four counts of criminal homicide, conspiracy to commit criminal homicide, abuse of a corpse, and 12 other charges.

On July 14, Sean Michael Kratz was also charged with three counts of criminal homicide, conspiracy to commit criminal homicide, abuse of a corpse, and two other charges. Unlike DiNardo, Kratz had a criminal history of burglary, conspiracy, criminal trespassing, theft, receiving stolen property, and criminal mischief.

On May 16, 2018, DiNardo pleaded guilty to four counts of murder and was sentenced to four consecutive life sentences without the possibility of parole. Later that day, Kratz rejected a plea deal of 118 years with the possibility of parole after serving 59 years. His trial was scheduled for 2019.

On November 15, 2019, Kratz was convicted of first- and second-degree murder in the death of Dean Finocchiaro and voluntary manslaughter in the deaths of Tom Meo and Mark Sturgis and was later sentenced to life in prison without the possibility of parole.

== See also ==
- Crime in Pennsylvania
- List of people who disappeared
