= Lough na Glack =

Lake in County Monaghan, Ireland

- Location in Ireland
- Location: County Monaghan
- Coordinates: 53.96631°N 6.70057°W
- Basin countries: Ireland
- Surface area: 0.12 km^{2} (0.05 sq mi)
- Average depth: 3–5 m (10–16 ft)
- Max. depth: 7 m (23 ft)
- Settlements: Carrickmacross

Lough na Glack is a lake in County Monaghan, Ireland. It is located 1.75 kilometres (1 mi) southeast of Carrickmacross.
