= Disappearance of Alex Batty =

International missing child case 2017–2023

Alex Batty
- Born: 13 February 2006 (age 20)
- Disappeared: 8 October 2017 (aged 11); Port of Málaga, Spain
- Status: Found alive on 13 December 2023

Alex Batty is a British man who went missing at the age of 11 in October 2017 and reappeared on 13 December 2023.

Batty disappeared after going on a holiday trip to Spain with his mother and grandfather. During the intervening six years, Batty lived "an off-the-grid life" with them in Morocco, Spain, and southwest France. At the age of 14 he decided to return to a more traditional life, and made his escape three years later at the age of 17, when, he said, his mother planned to relocate to Finland. Batty later told Greater Manchester Police that after he left his mother, he headed for Toulouse on foot and was later found by a delivery driver. On 22 December, after interviewing Batty, police confirmed they had launched a criminal investigation into his alleged abduction at the age of 11.

== Background ==
Batty was born on 13 February 2006. His father left when he was two years old and he was raised by his mother, Melanie Batty, and maternal grandmother, Susan Caruana. His grandmother later became his legal guardian. He lived in Oldham, Greater Manchester, and attended Hathershaw College.

Batty at times travelled abroad with his mother and grandfather. In 2014, the three stayed in a commune in North Africa.

== Disappearance ==
When Batty was 11 years old, he travelled to Andalusia in Spain with his mother, Melanie Batty, then 37, and grandfather, David Batty, then 58, in September 2017. Neither adult had legal custody of the boy. On 30 September, the three flew into Malaga Airport, with plans to stay in Marbella. Caruana had given permission for the two to take her grandson out of the country.

The three did not return to the United Kingdom on 8 October as planned; Batty was last seen that day at the Port of Malaga. Later that day, Batty's grandmother received a message on Facebook with a video of her grandson with his mother and grandfather. In the video, Melanie laid out her reasons for leaving, including that she did not want Batty to attend school.

Batty reported in 2023 that he, Melanie, and David had lived a "nomadic life" since 2017, moving from house to house frequently and often living with other families. He said they joined a "religious community" of roughly ten members and said meditation and discussions on reincarnation were common. They grew their own food and used solar panels, which they carried from one home to the next, and the adults found odd jobs to make money. He did not attend any official schools.

The trio spent about two years in Morocco, then travelled through Spain into southwestern France. From 2021 to 2023, they lived in and around the Pyrenees mountains.

Batty attempted to enrol at a school in Quillan in November 2023, but was denied admission because he lacked identity papers. School authorities alerted the police about Batty, but the report was not followed up.

== Investigation ==
After Batty, his mother, and his grandfather failed to return to the United Kingdom, police initially suspected they might have travelled to Melila, Spain in hopes of travelling to Morocco. Greater Manchester Police began trying to locate Batty, noting they did not believe he was in immediate danger, but that they were concerned for his welfare.

== Recovery and return to the United Kingdom ==
Batty described the first few years he was away as being like a holiday, when he spent much of his time "reading, drawing, and going to the beach", but said this changed when he was around 14 and was required to work on construction projects for his food and upkeep. It was at this point he began thinking about returning to the UK. "I started weighing up the pros and cons of each 'lifestyle' and after a couple of months I realised... England was definitely the way forward." After deciding he would leave, Batty wrote his mother a goodbye note, telling her "how much I loved her, how much I appreciated what she had done for me. I didn’t want her to worry about me". He said he then took a warm jacket, his skateboard and some money, and left in the "pitch black" of night while it was "raining quite a lot".

On 13 December 2023, Fabien Accidini, a 26-year-old Toulousain chiropractic student working as a deliveryman, was driving between Camon and Chalabre when he came across Batty, who was walking alongside the road at 3 a.m., carrying a backpack, a torch, and a skateboard. Accidini passed him and made a delivery, then encountered him again as he returned along the same route. He pulled over and offered Batty a ride, which was accepted. Batty initially gave Accidini a false name, but divulged his real identity after a few minutes. They spoke together in French and English over the next three hours as Accidini completed his deliveries of medicines to pharmacies. Batty then used Accidini's mobile phone to text his grandmother. He texted: "I love you, I want to come home." Accidini took Batty to Revel, Haute-Garonne, where he handed him over to the police.

Hoping to protect his mother and grandfather from prosecution, Batty initially said he left his mother after she told him she wanted to move to Finland and that his grandfather had died several months earlier. He said he had been walking on his own for four days, sleeping during the day and eating food foraged from gardens, heading for Toulouse in the hope of finding a British consulate that would help him return to the UK. He later said he had walked for just two days. After Batty's discovery, French authorities took Batty into custody. They later confirmed he was "in good health" and "[did] not appear to have been abused".

Batty returned to the UK on 16 December, where he was expected to live with his custodial guardian, his maternal grandmother. In an exclusive interview with British tabloid newspaper The Sun, made public on 21 December 2023, he said he had fabricated a story about a four-day journey, in the hope that it would prevent police from tracking his family down.

On 22 December, Greater Manchester Police confirmed that they had interviewed Batty and had launched a criminal investigation into his alleged abduction at the age of 11.

In 2025, Greater Manchester Police called off their criminal investigation into Batty’s disappearance as the family did not support the child abduction probe and there was “no realistic chance of prosecution”. Throughout his interviews Batty had been adamant that he did not want his mother and grandfather prosecuted. In May 2026 the BBC released a documentary “Kidnapped by My Mum”, documenting the story of Batty’s disappearance, rediscovery, and how he had lived in the meantime, as he returned to Spain and France to retrace his journey and try to understand why he was abducted. Batty had recently become the father of a baby girl.

== See also ==
- List of solved missing person cases (post-2000)
