= Janusz Wojcieszak =

Polish philosopher (1953–2012)

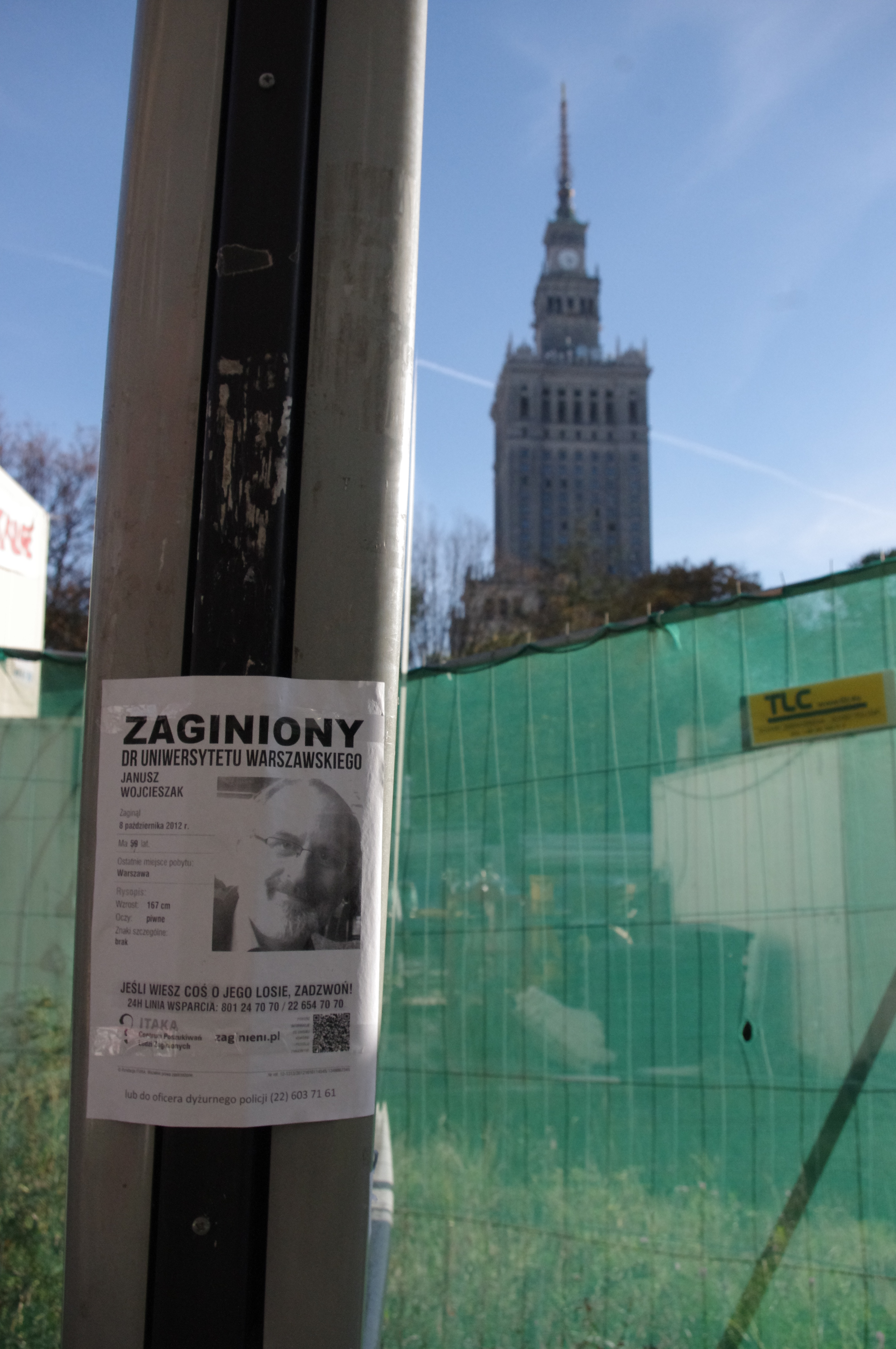
- Wojcieszak's picture on a lamppost following his disappearance in October 2012
- Born: 1953
- Died: c. 8 October 2012; Warsaw, Poland
- Cause of death: Suicide
- Occupations: Philologist, philosopher

Janusz Wojcieszak (1953–2012) was a Polish philologist and philosopher, specialist in the history, literature and culture of Latin America. He graduated from Warsaw University's Department of Spanish Studies in 1977 and the following year was hired by his alma mater as an assistant, eventually rising to the rank of professor. He committed suicide in October 2012.

Initially declared a missing person, Wojcieszak's body was found floating in the Vistula close to Gdański Bridge on 17 October 2012.

In addition to his own works, he translated numerous books by Spanish and Latin American authors. Among them were works by:

- José Ortega y Gasset (Meditaciones del Quijote, published in 2008),
- José Piñera (Without Fear of the Future: The political economy of the retirement system in Chile; 1996),
- Horacio Cerutti Guldberg (Filosofía nuestroamericana; 2011),
- Alfonso Reyes (Notas sobre la inteligencia americana; 1994).
- Tzvetan Todorov (The Conquest of America: The Question of the Other; 1996),
- Fernando Savater (Ética para Amador, 1996),
- José Vasconcelos (La Raza Cósmica, 1993)

== See also ==
- List of solved missing person cases (post-2000)
