= Disappearance of Charity Aiyedogbon =

2016 missing person case in Nigeria

Charity Aiyedogbon
- Born: Charity Aiyedogbon
- Disappeared: May 9, 2016; Abuja, Nigeria
- Died: Ushafa, Nigeria
- Other name: Deepdeal Chacha de Hammer
- Citizenship: Nigerian
- Occupation: businesswoman
- Known for: Disappearing without a trace
- Spouse: David Aiyedogbon
- Children: Juliet Aiyedogbon (daughter) + 3 other children

Charity Aiyedogbon was a Nigerian businesswoman who went missing on 9 May 2016 in Abuja. Paul Ezeugo and Emmanuel Adogah have since confessed to the murder of Aiyedogbon stating that gaining access to her money and her vehicle were the motive. Ezeugo claims he and Aiyedogbon were dating for a year and met on website Facebook.

== Background ==
Charity was a businesswoman who owned a joint venture called Chavid Limited (a combination of her name "Charity" and her husband's name "David"), which consisted of a fashion-design business and a restaurant, also located in Abuja. She was a mother of four children, estranged from her husband of 15 years, David Aiyedogbon, and was living in a rented apartment.

Besides her business activities, Charity was also active on Facebook prior to her disappearance, where she was popularly known by the name "Deepdeal Chacha De Hammer" and was a member of a Facebook group "FEMALE IN NIGERIA" (FIN). According to information from her Facebook friends, her last known update on social media was made on 11 May 2016 in the form of a photograph of herself sitting in a vehicle with the words "going on a road trip" at about 9:11 am.

== Investigations ==
It became apparent that Charity had previously received threats to her safety from some undisclosed individuals in the days before her disappearance. Her friends revealed that the threats prompted her to contract a technician to install CCTV cameras in her apartment. After her disappearance, all attempts to contact her though her mobile phone were unsuccessful.

Charity's case was reported to the Gwarimpa Police Division in Abuja. Investigators gained access into her Abuja apartment with the help of her landlady and some security personnel. Further investigations revealed that there was no indication that she had planned to go on any trip, as she had no bag packed and every item in her apartment was in order. A pot of stew was still on the cooker. Investigative efforts to retrieve her call logs revealed that the last call from her phone was made on 9 May, to a number registered to an individual named Rabi Mohammed. The last received call from another number showed the same date. The Federal Capital Territory Police Command arrested some suspects in connection with her disappearance (who were later released), while her vehicle and two mobile phones were recovered.

== Aftermath ==
A Nigerian lawyer, Emeka Ugwonye, accused Charity's estranged husband David of being involved in her disappearance. However, no concrete evidence could be found to implicate him. David later sued the lawyer for defamation. Some have gone on further to question the professionalism and claims of the lawyer.

Charity's eldest daughter, Juliet, received backlash on social media for planning to proceed with her wedding while her mother was recently declared missing. However, the wedding was postponed indefinitely as a result of further controversy following Ugwuonye's claims about her missing mother.

Various support groups have emerged to bring justice for Charity. The dismembered corpse of an unidentified woman discovered in Abuja was rumoured to belong to Charity. However, no DNA test has been conducted by the police to confirm her identity. To date, no conclusion has been drawn regarding the dismembered body.

== Trials and conviction ==
A website designer, Paul Ezeugo, 27, has been arrested by the police in Abuja over an allegation that he killed a woman he met on Facebook. It was learnt that Ezeugo dated Mrs Charity Chidiebere Aiyedogbon for one year, after which, he and his friend, Emmanuel Adogah, 28, murdered her on May 9, 2016, and stole her Acura ZDX Sports Utility Vehicle which was recovered in Enugu where it was hidden, Punch Reports.

The police had been on a manhunt for the two suspects since May, 2016 when Charity's mutilated body was found packaged in two sacks at a river bank in Ushafa, a satellite community in Bwari Area Council of the Federal Capital Territory, Abuja.

== See also ==
- List of people who disappeared mysteriously (2000–present)
