= Murder of Ko Joon-hee =

2017 child murder in Jeonju, South Korea

Ko Joon-hee
- Born: 2011 or 2012; South Korea
- Died: November 2017 (aged 5); Jeonju, South Korea
- Cause of death: Shock (homicide)
- Known for: Murder victim

The murder of Ko Joon-hee refers to the murder of a five-year-old girl in Jeonju-si, South Korea. Ko Joon-hee was killed in November 2017 in Eau-dong, Jeonju-si, South Korea. Initially, the police were notified that a five-year-old child had gone missing. However, after a thorough investigation, Ko Joon-hee was found to have been murdered due to physical abuse by her biological father. The father, Ko Byung-sik, his common-law-wife, and his mother-in-law had conspired to murder and abandon the child. Due to the brutality of the case, a wave of shock resonated throughout the country of South Korea.

== Crime ==
Ko Joon-hee went missing on November 18, 2017. One month later, on December 8, Joon-hee's paternal grandmother reported the disappearance to the police.

With the family's consent, the police collected DNA samples and asked the National Institute of Scientific Investigation to conduct an inspection. Investigators found that Ko Joon-hee had been buried on a hill in Gunsan, and that she had died of shock caused by physical abuse which included at least three broken ribs at the time of her death. The family later gave testimony on the whereabouts of their missing daughter. However, the police suspected that the statements and timelines on the sequence of events were not consistent, and they began to suspect that Ko Joon-hee had been murdered by her father. As a result, the police continued investigating the father.

== Trial and prosecution ==
In the first trial on June 29, 2018, the prosecutors demanded life-in-prison for Ko Joon-hee's father on charges of homicide by abuse. However, the court sentenced him to 20 years in prison.

After the trial, the father filed an appeal, saying the sentence from the first trial was too heavy. Prosecutors also appealed, arguing that the sentence was too light.

The appellate court of the second trial, Gwangju High Court, also judged that Ko was the main culprit in the child's abuse and consequent death, similar to the verdict of the first trial. The court also ruled that his wife, Lee, was the accomplice and charged her with active neglect and abuse of the child. The court also upheld the original ruling of 160 hours of enrollment in a treatment program on child abuse for the father and his wife. Furthermore, the court rejected an appeal by Ko's wife, Lee, who was sentenced to four years in prison in the first trial, who helped to bury the child.

On May 9, 2019, the Supreme Court upheld the original ruling, rejecting both the defendant's and the prosecution's appeals and finally sentencing the biological father, Ko, to 20 years in prison and his wife, Lee, to 10 years in prison. Lee's mother, identified only by her surname, Kim, was also sentenced to four years in prison.

== See also ==
- List of solved missing person cases (post-2000)
