= List of people who disappeared mysteriously (2000–present) =

This is a list of people who have disappeared mysteriously since 2000. This includes people whose whereabouts are unknown or whose deaths are not substantiated, except for people who disappeared at sea. Many who disappear are eventually declared dead in absentia, but the circumstances and dates of their deaths remain a mystery. Some were possibly subjected to enforced disappearance, but in many cases, information on their ultimate fates is unknown.

The global statistical data on missing persons from the late 20th and early 21st centuries is unreliable due to several factors, including international migration and travel and legal protection for individuals who may have chosen to disappear intentionally. According to the International Commission on Missing Persons, "There are few comprehensive and reliable statistics regarding the number of persons who go missing throughout the world as a result of trafficking, drug-related violence, and migration. Even the numbers of persons missing as a result of armed conflict and human-rights abuses, which are more intensively monitored, are difficult to verify, given the reluctance of most states to deal honestly and effectively with this issue".

By the mid-1990s in the United States, the number of missing person cases had grown to nearly one million, though this number declined by nearly half by 2021. In 2014, there were an estimated 90,000 people missing in the United States at any given time, with about 60% being adults, and 40% being children; in 2021, the total number of missing person cases was around 520,000. Per a 2017 report, the U.S. states of Oregon, Arizona, and Alaska have the highest amount of missing persons per 100,000 people. In Canada, the population is around one tenth of the United States; so the number of missing-person cases is smaller, but the rate per capita is higher with an estimated 71,000 reported in 2015. Of these missing Canadians, 88% are found within a week, while roughly 500 individuals remain missing after a year. In the United Kingdom, a 2024 estimate stated that 170,000 Britons go missing every year. In some countries, such as Japan, the prevalence of missing persons is not commensurate with known data, as significant numbers of missing individuals go unreported to authorities. However, it was estimated in 2025 that 70,000 to 90,000 Japanese go missing every year.

== 2000s ==
=== 2000 ===
Date	Person(s)	Age when disappeared	Missing from	Circumstances	Refs.
2 February 2000	Khadzhi-Murat Yandiev	25	Grozny, Russia	An Ingush insurgent fighter last seen alive on 2 February 2000. Yandiev is known to have been captured by the Russian Army prior to his disappearance, although his ultimate fate remains unknown.	
14 February 2000	Asha Degree	9	Shelby, North Carolina, U.S.	Degree was last seen in the early morning hours of 14 February 2000, while running into a woodlot off North Carolina Highway 18 on a rainy and very windy day. Some of her personal effects were found three days later in a nearby shed, and her backpack was found buried 20 miles (32 km) away in August 2001. No other signs of her have been found since then, and theories have ranged from running away to foul play.	
13 March 2000	Leah Roberts	23	Bellingham, Washington, U.S.	Roberts, a native of Durham, North Carolina, embarked on a cross-country road trip to northern Washington in early March 2000. Her car was found wrecked and abandoned some days later off the Mount Baker Highway. She had last been seen in a restaurant at a local shopping mall on 13 March. According to one report, she was seen walking disoriented around a gas station in Everett shortly after her car was discovered, and she has not been seen or heard from since.	
17 March 2000	Joseph Kibweteere	68	Kanungu, Uganda	Kibweteere, a leader of the Movement for the Restoration of the Ten Commandments of God, is believed to have died on 17 March 2000, but in 2014, the Uganda National Police announced that reports were received that Kibweteere was hiding in Malawi.	
25 May 2000	Bruno Manser	45	Bukit Batu Lawi, Malaysia	A Swiss traveler who lived with the Penan people of Borneo during the 1970s and 1980s, Manser became an internationally prominent activist in the fight for the Penan's land rights, and opposition to logging and rain-forest destruction. He was in the country illegally, and was continually hunted by authorities and escaped numerous times under gunfire. He eventually escaped the country in disguise and went on a world tour to raise awareness about the Penan, including founding a nonprofit organization. In 2000, against all advice, he covertly re-entered Borneo. Manser was last seen in the jungle near Bukit Batu Lawi, a 2,000-m limestone pinnacle in Sarawak. Manser stated his intention to climb the pinnacle alone. The Penan mounted a search and rescue mission after he failed to return; he has not been seen since.	
23 June 2000	Louis Roy	40	Montreal, Quebec	Roy was a wealthy Hells Angels member and Canadian gangster who disappeared on 23 June 2000 from Montreal, Quebec, and has not been seen since. He is believed to have been murdered.	
7 July 2000	Dzmitry Zavadski	27	Minsk, Belarus	Belarusian journalist and cameraman Zavadski disappeared on 7 July 2000 at Minsk National Airport and was presumably murdered.	
August 2000	Shamsa bint Mohammed Al Maktoum	19	Cambridge, England	Al Maktoum, an Emirati member of the Dubai ruling family who fled to the UK to live a less restrictive life, was abducted on the streets of Cambridge by four men hired by her father, flown back to Dubai, and has not been seen since.	
8 December 2000	Trevor Deely	22	Dublin, Ireland	Deely was returning home from a work Christmas party in Dublin. He was seen talking to an unknown man outside his office. At 4:14 a.m. CCTV footage shows Deely walking past what was then the AIB bank on the corner of Baggot Street Bridge and Haddington Road in the direction of his apartment. About 30 seconds later, the footage shows a man dressed in black passing by the bank. In December 2023, Gardaí Síochána said that they tracked down this man and believe he is not linked to the disappearance of Deely and was not the same person waiting outside the bank. Despite numerous appeals over many years since his disappearance, Deely's whereabouts are still unknown.	

=== 2001 ===
Date	Person(s)	Age when disappeared	Missing from	Circumstances	Refs.
c. 2001	Riaz Ahmed Gohar Shahi	60	London, England	Shahi, a Pakistani religious scholar and founder of the Messiah Foundation International, an organization dedicated to spreading religious studies, disappeared from public view around 2001 while residing in London. Various rumors surround his disappearance, including that he died in 2001 or 2003.	
2 January 2001	Zelimkhan Murdalov	26	Grozny, Chechnya	Murdalov, a student, left his home on 2 January 2001, saying he would return, but never did. His parents tracked him down at the police station where an official promised that he would soon be released, but they have not seen their son since. According to witnesses, Murdalov was subsequently severely beaten while in police custody, and his fate remains unknown.	
18 January 2001	Rilya Wilson	4	Miami, Florida, U.S.	Wilson, a foster child of the Florida Department of Children and Families, disappeared on 18 January 2001 in Miami. She was not reported missing until 2002, when she became the focus of an investigation into neglect and mismanagement in the organization.	
6 March 2001	Asami Chida	16	Hokkaido, Japan	A high school student who disappeared while travelling to her part-time job at a bakery.	
4 April 2001	Shaina Kirkpatrick	3	Portland, Oregon, U.S.	Kirkpatrick and Henson were sisters who disappeared with their mother, Kimyala Henson, on 4 April 2001. Henson's body was found partially buried near Pyramid Lake on 28 April, but the fate of Kirkpatrick and baby Henson remains unknown.	
4 April 2001	Shausha Henson	2 months	Portland, Oregon, U.S.	Kirkpatrick and Henson were sisters who disappeared with their mother, Kimyala Henson, on 4 April 2001. Henson's body was found partially buried near Pyramid Lake on 28 April, but the fate of Kirkpatrick and baby Henson remains unknown.	
11 April 2001	Branson Perry	20	Skidmore, Missouri, U.S.	Perry disappeared outside his home. A female friend was helping him clean in preparation for his father's return from the hospital; she stated he told her he was taking a pair of jumper cables to an exterior shed. He never returned. In 2004, while investigating Jack Wayne Rogers on unrelated charges, a message board post from his computer was discovered detailing a first-hand account of Perry's alleged rape, torture and murder. Rogers denies involvement in his disappearance, and Perry's whereabouts remain unknown.	
17 May 2001	Alissa Turney	17	Phoenix, Arizona, U.S.	Turney was last seen by her stepfather around midday on 17 May 2001 after supposedly arguing with him. While the circumstances surrounding her case remain unclear, Turney's stepfather was later charged with her supposed murder. However, in July 2023, all charges against him were dismissed. Alissa's body has still not been found.	
10 June 2001	Aleksandr Khazanov	22	Brooklyn, New York, U.S.	Khazanov, a Russian–American mathematical child prodigy who was one of the youngest students to submit a perfect paper for the 1994 International Mathematical Olympiad, went missing after going out with his mountain bike, leaving behind a letter claiming that he was "going to the library". At the time of his disappearance, he was suffering from depression and drug addiction.	
13 June 2001	Jason Jolkowski	19	Omaha, Nebraska, U.S.	Jolkowski failed to show up at a local high school, where he had arranged to catch a ride to work with a friend. The last confirmed sighting of Jolkowski was by a neighbor, who reported seeing Jolkowski carrying trash cans into his garage about 30 minutes prior to when he was to meet at the high school.	
12 July 2001	Tot Tran Harriman	57	League City, Texas, U.S.	57-year-old Tot Tran Harriman was last seen leaving her son's residence near League City, Texas in her 1995 Lincoln Continental on 12 July 2001. She had been visiting relatives in both League City and Corpus Christi. Neither Harriman nor her vehicle have been located.	
30 July 2001	Louise Kerton	25	Aachen Hauptbahnhof, Germany	Kerton, a British student nurse from Broadstairs, Kent, disappeared in Germany on 30 July 2001. She was last seen by her fiancé's mother at Aachen Hauptbahnhof station, intending to travel to Ostend.	
10 September 2001	Sneha Anne Philip	31	New York City, U.S.	Philip, a physician, was last seen 10 September 2001 on surveillance-camera footage from a store near her Lower Manhattan apartment. Due to the proximity of the World Trade Center, and her medical training, her family believes she perished trying to help victims of the next day's terrorist attack. A court agreed, and she is officially considered to have died that way. The ruling was not unanimous, and no proof of her death has been found.	
11 September 2001	Michele Anne Harris	34	Smithboro, New York, U.S.	Harris was last seen leaving her boyfriend's apartment late on 11 September 2001. She had gone there after work to return to her home in nearby Spencer, where she and her wealthy husband were nearing the end of a bitter divorce. The next morning, her abandoned car was found on the road near her driveway. State police manpower and resources were limited at first, as they had been diverted to New York City in the wake of the terror attacks. Over the course of three trials, her husband was tried, convicted, and later had his conviction overturned. He had reportedly made threats and there was blood evidence in the garage, although a body or weapon was never found.	
c. September 2001	Mahmoud Mahmoud Atta	47	United States	A naturalized U.S. citizen, Atta was an alleged militant from the Palestine Liberation Organization suspected to be responsible for a 1986 bus bombing. Initially believed to be one of the hijackers responsible for the September 11 attacks, Atta was later proven not to have been on board any of the four planes used in the attacks. His current whereabouts are unknown.	
30 September 2001	Pascal Zimmer	5	Saarbrücken, Saarland	Zimmer, a German boy, disappeared from Saarbrücken, Saarland, Germany, on 30 September 2001 and has not been seen since.	
13 November 2001	Abigail Blagg	6	Grand Junction, Colorado, U.S.	Blagg disappeared during the murder of her mother and has not been seen since.	

=== 2002 ===
Date	Person(s)	Age when disappeared	Missing from	Circumstances	Refs.
13 January 2002	Rubén Gill	56	Entre Ríos Province, Argentina	The six members of the Gill family were last seen visiting a friend in the town of Viale. Despite reported sightings, none of the family members has ever been seen again. Following the 2016 death of their landlord, who was alleged to have been involved in their disappearance, the case is being considered for reinvestigation.	
13 January 2002	Margarita Gill	26	Entre Ríos Province, Argentina	The six members of the Gill family were last seen visiting a friend in the town of Viale. Despite reported sightings, none of the family members has ever been seen again. Following the 2016 death of their landlord, who was alleged to have been involved in their disappearance, the case is being considered for reinvestigation.	
13 January 2002	María Gill	12	Entre Ríos Province, Argentina	The six members of the Gill family were last seen visiting a friend in the town of Viale. Despite reported sightings, none of the family members has ever been seen again. Following the 2016 death of their landlord, who was alleged to have been involved in their disappearance, the case is being considered for reinvestigation.	
13 January 2002	Osvaldo Gill	9	Entre Ríos Province, Argentina	The six members of the Gill family were last seen visiting a friend in the town of Viale. Despite reported sightings, none of the family members has ever been seen again. Following the 2016 death of their landlord, who was alleged to have been involved in their disappearance, the case is being considered for reinvestigation.	
13 January 2002	Sofía Gill	6	Entre Ríos Province, Argentina	The six members of the Gill family were last seen visiting a friend in the town of Viale. Despite reported sightings, none of the family members has ever been seen again. Following the 2016 death of their landlord, who was alleged to have been involved in their disappearance, the case is being considered for reinvestigation.	
13 January 2002	Carlos Gill	4	Entre Ríos Province, Argentina	The six members of the Gill family were last seen visiting a friend in the town of Viale. Despite reported sightings, none of the family members has ever been seen again. Following the 2016 death of their landlord, who was alleged to have been involved in their disappearance, the case is being considered for reinvestigation.	
30 March 2002	Niamh Maye	18	Jingellic, Australia	Maye camped at Jingellic on 29 March 2002, accompanied by Jason Nickalson. The pair left the next day. Maye did not travel along her planned route and has not been seen since; Nickalson was the last person known to have seen her. Six months after Maye's disappearance, Nickalson was arrested for the rape of a 19-year-old girl and committed suicide.	
3 April 2002	Marita Verón	23	Tucumán Province, Argentina	Argentinian woman Verón is believed to have been kidnapped on 3 April 2002 from her home town in Tucumán Province and has not been seen since.	
22 June 2002	Tina Lim	14	Singapore	Tina Lim Xin Ying was last seen leaving her home to visit her grandfather at about 4:15 p.m. on 22 June 2002. She was not seen or heard of until 1 November 2003, the last day of her grandfather's funeral, when her family received a series of mysterious phone calls which appear to have been made by Tina. Police investigated the source of the calls and concluded they were not made by Tina, but her family disagrees. There has been no news about her since.	
1 July 2002	Lisa Marie Young	21	Nanaimo, British Columbia, Canada	Young disappeared on Canada Day after partying with friends, last being seen in a maroon Jaguar. The driver was later questioned and released by investigators, who have made no progress in the case despite receiving hundreds of tips and having "hundreds of witnesses" on file. A neighbour of a relevant location reported seeing "a body in a hammock" and then "equipment moving a lot of soil around in the backyard". Eighteen years later, the property was searched, although concerns have been raised as to RCMP efforts in the search and overall handling of the case.	
9 November 2002	Joshua Guimond	20	Collegeville, Minnesota, U.S.	Guimond disappeared after leaving a party in Collegeville, Minnesota. He was last seen on a bridge spanning Stumpf Lake. The Stearns County Sheriff's Office discovered his scent by the lake using a K9 unit, and theorized he had fallen or was pushed into the lake. Divers searched the lake multiple times and found no body. Investigators now theorize he was kidnapped or picked up via a car from the bridge.	
December 2002	Boris Şyhmyradow	53	Ashgabat, Turkmenistan	Şyhmyradow and Berdiýew were ex-Foreign Ministers of Turkmenistan who announced their opposition to then President Saparmurat Niyazov. They were detained and sentenced to life imprisonment after they were convicted of alleged participation in a plot against Niyazov in 2002. Little is known about their life in prison after a closed trial, and it is unknown whether they are still alive. Their whereabouts remain unknown.	
December 2002	Batyr Berdiýew	42	Ashgabat, Turkmenistan	Şyhmyradow and Berdiýew were ex-Foreign Ministers of Turkmenistan who announced their opposition to then President Saparmurat Niyazov. They were detained and sentenced to life imprisonment after they were convicted of alleged participation in a plot against Niyazov in 2002. Little is known about their life in prison after a closed trial, and it is unknown whether they are still alive. Their whereabouts remain unknown.	
c. 2002	Saeed Zeinali	26	Tehran, Iran	Zeinali, an Iranian student at Tehran University, was arrested on 10 July 1999, and was said to be held in jail at least until 2002. He disappeared after being released and has not been seen since.	
c. 2002	Qari Ahmadullah	37	Zadran District, Afghanistan	Ahmadullah, an Afghan politician and the first interior minister of the Taliban, was supposedly killed by a drone strike in early 2002, but was later determined to be alive. His whereabouts remain unknown.	

=== 2003 ===
Date	Person(s)	Age when disappeared	Missing from	Circumstances	Refs.
4 February 2003	Sofia Juarez	4	Kennewick, Washington, U.S.	One day before her fifth birthday, Juarez told her mother she would accompany her grandmother's boyfriend to a local convenience store, but after being left behind, left the house anyway. Witnesses may have seen her after she left the house, but she never arrived at the store, and her whereabouts are unknown.	
22 March 2003	Frédéric Nérac	43–44	Iraq	Nérac was a French journalist who mysteriously disappeared on 22 March 2003 while reporting in Iraq. Search attempts to locate Nérac have been unsuccessful.	
29 April 2003	Tabitha Tuders	13	East Nashville, Tennessee, U.S.	Tabitha Tuders, a student from Nashville, Tennessee, vanished on 29 April 2003 after setting out for her school bus stop. She failed to arrive at school, reported sightings were never confirmed, and her disappearance remains unsolved.	
25 May 2003	Ben Charles Padilla	50	Luanda, Angola	Padilla, a licensed aircraft mechanic, flight engineer, and pilot of small airplanes, and Mutantu, a hired mechanic from the Republic of the Congo, were on board a Boeing 727-223 designation N844AA when it was stolen. They have not been heard from since.	
25 May 2003	John Mikel Mutantu	Unknown	Luanda, Angola	Padilla, a licensed aircraft mechanic, flight engineer, and pilot of small airplanes, and Mutantu, a hired mechanic from the Republic of the Congo, were on board a Boeing 727-223 designation N844AA when it was stolen. They have not been heard from since.	
14 June 2003	LeeAnna Warner	5	Chisholm, Minnesota, U.S.	Warner, an American girl, disappeared from Chisholm, Minnesota, on 14 June 2003 and is believed to have been kidnapped and murdered.	
4 July 2003	Ali Astamirov	34	Nazran, Russia	Astamirov, a Chechen journalist, who was working for Agence France Presse in Ingushetia, Russia, was allegedly kidnapped at gunpoint by a group of three masked men in uniforms on 4 July 2003. His whereabouts are unknown.	
11 August 2003	Reda Helal	Unknown	Cairo, Egypt	Egyptian journalist Helal went missing on 11 August 2003 in downtown Cairo and is believed to have been kidnapped, but little evidence supports this belief.	
1 October 2003	Felipe Santos	24	Naples, Florida, U.S.	Santos was last seen being arrested for driving without a license after a traffic accident. Jail records show he was never booked, and officer Steve Calkins claimed to have changed his mind and left Santos at a nearby Circle K convenience store. Three months later, another man, Terrance Williams, disappeared after being arrested by the same police officer.	
9 October 2003	Kirk von Ackermann	37	Iraq	Von Ackermann disappeared after calling an Iraqi employee of U.S. defense contractor Ultra Services for help fixing a flat tire on his car. When the employee arrived at the given location between Kirkuk and Tikrit 45 minutes later, von Ackermann was gone. No signs of a struggle were noticed, and $40,000 in cash was left in the car along with von Ackermann's laptop and satellite phone. The circumstances suggest he was not the victim of a robbery attempt, and neither his employer nor family were contacted with ransom demands. Nevertheless, the U.S. Army Criminal Investigation Command later concluded he was killed in a botched kidnapping, and it still considers the case open though his body has not been found.	
1 November 2003	Charlene Downes	14	Blackpool, England	Downes disappeared from her home town of Blackpool, and has not been seen since. She may have been murdered.	
14 December 2003	Pamela Holopainen	22	Timmins, Canada	Holopainen was last sighted leaving a house party with her common-law spouse on foot in Timmins, Ontario, and has not been seen since. Although investigators have found no physical leads since her disappearance, she is believed to have been the victim of foul play.	

=== 2004 ===
Date	Person(s)	Age when disappeared	Missing from	Circumstances	Refs.
Early 2004	Tariq Mahmood	Unknown	Pakistan	Mahmood was assigned a 10 November 2003 court date in Islamabad and made court appearances over the following four weeks. However, despite the ongoing legal process, his whereabouts became unclear by early 2004. He has not been seen or heard from since.	
12 January 2004	Terrance Williams	27	Naples, Florida, U.S.	Williams disappeared after being arrested by Collier County sheriff's deputy Steve Calkins on 12 January 2004. The circumstances of his disappearance were similar to that of Felipe Santos, who disappeared after being stopped and arrested by Calkins three months earlier.	
9 February 2004	Maura Murray	21	Woodsville, New Hampshire, U.S.	Murray, a nursing student at the University of Massachusetts Amherst, was last seen on New Hampshire Route 112 at the scene of a minor single-vehicle accident, in which her car was disabled after crashing into a roadside snowbank. Earlier that day, she lied to professors about a death in her family, stating that she would be absent from class for a week. A school bus driver who happened upon Murray's crash site stopped to ask if she needed help, and Murray declined. Upon returning home a short time later, the bus driver called police anyway, but by the time first responders arrived ten minutes later, Murray had vanished. Her keys, bank card, and credit cards have never been located, despite extensive searches of her abandoned car and the neighboring wooded areas.	
6 March 2004	Dominick Arduin	42	Siberia	A Frenchwoman who disappeared in her attempt to ski to the North Pole. Arduin disappeared on 6 March 2004, having begun her attempt to become the first woman to ski solo in the North Pole, from Cape Arctichesky in Siberia the previous day.	
12 March 2004	Somchai Neelapaijit	52	Bangkok, Thailand	Somchai, a Thai Muslim lawyer and human-rights activist representing South Thailand insurgency terrorism suspects, was last seen in what may be a case of a forced disappearance.	
19 March 2004	Brianna Maitland	17	Montgomery, Vermont, U.S.	Maitland vanished after leaving her job as a dishwasher at the Black Lantern Inn. Her car was discovered the next day, parked at an odd angle with its rear bumper smashed into an abandoned barn, about 1 mile (1.6 km) away. Maitland's belongings were found inside the vehicle, including a recent paycheck and her wallet. Authorities believe foul play to be involved in Maitland's case, and one theory is that she may have been smuggled across the nearby Canada–U.S. border.	
28 March 2004	Timothy Verne Perryman	53	Agoura Hills, California, U.S.	Perryman, a husband and father of two, vanished without a trace after leaving his car in the driveway of his family's suburban Los Angeles home and heading out on foot. Family and friends suspected that he may have gone hiking in one of the local rural areas, but despite many areas having been searched by police and local volunteers, no trace of him has been found.	
11 April 2004	Amber Cates	16	Columbia, Tennessee, U.S.	Cates, a 16-year-old from Columbia, Tennessee, disappeared in April 2004 after leaving with acquaintances. Despite new leads in 2024, her case remains unsolved.	
16 April 2004	Guy-André Kieffer	54	Abidjan, Ivory Coast	Kieffer, a French Canadian journalist who had long covered West Africa, was kidnapped from a shopping mall's parking lot. Remains found eight years later possibly belonged to him, but have not been conclusively identified.	
May 2004	Mohammed Al Afghani	Unknown	Peshawar, Pakistan	Afghani was detained by the U.S. Central Intelligence Agency in Pakistan in May 2004 and his whereabouts are unknown.	
14 August 2004	David Louis Sneddon	24	Yunnan, China	Sneddon's disappearance near Tiger Leaping Gorge was a complete mystery, and the Chinese Government concluded that he drowned in Jinsha River, though no body had been recovered. However, in 2016, the Abductee's Family Union claimed to have found Sneddon in North Korea, where he became the personal English tutor for Kim Jong-un. The North Korean government denies involvement in Sneddon's disappearance, and the U.S. State Department says that it has no verifiable evidence of this claim. Both the House of Representatives and Senate have unanimously voted to direct the State Department to reopen Sneddon's case.	
20 August 2004	Garrett Alexander Bardsley	12	Cuberant Lake, Utah, U.S.	Bardsley disappeared while on a backpacking trip with his father and a local Boy Scout group into the Uinta mountains. Volunteers and family periodically searched for the boy for almost a year after his disappearance, but were unable to find him.	
1 September 2004	Denise Pipitone	4	Mazara del Vallo, Italy	Denise disappeared on September 1, 2004, while she was near the house of her maternal grandmother in Mazara del Vallo.	
12 September 2004	Joana Cipriano	8	Figueira, Portugal	Cipriano disappeared in 2004. An investigation by the Polícia Judiciária, Portugal's criminal police, concluded that she was murdered by her mother Leonor Cipriano and uncle João Cipriano after witnessing them engage in incestuous sex. Her body was never found. Both suspects were convicted of murder based on apparent confessions, but later retracted their confessions, claiming innocence and alleging police misconduct. Similarities to the disappearance of Madeleine McCann a short distance away in 2007 have been noted.	
11 October 2004	Iraena Asher	25	Piha, New Zealand	Asher, a model who was allegedly suffering from bipolar disorder, disappeared in controversial circumstances in Piha, west of Auckland, on 11 October 2004.	

=== 2005 ===
Date	Person(s)	Age when disappeared	Missing from	Circumstances	Refs.
19 February 2005	Danielle Imbo	34	Philadelphia, Pennsylvania, U.S.	Imbo and Petrone Jr. disappeared after leaving a bar on Philadelphia's South Street on 19 February 2005. Neither individual nor their vehicle have been located, and their cell phones and personal finances have not been accessed since their disappearance. The FBI is investigating the case as a possible murder for hire, but have named no suspects.	
19 February 2005	Richard Petrone Jr.	35	Philadelphia, Pennsylvania, U.S.	Imbo and Petrone Jr. disappeared after leaving a bar on Philadelphia's South Street on 19 February 2005. Neither individual nor their vehicle have been located, and their cell phones and personal finances have not been accessed since their disappearance. The FBI is investigating the case as a possible murder for hire, but have named no suspects.	
27 February 2005	Lisa Dorrian	25	Northern Ireland	Dorrian, a Northern Irish woman, disappeared on 27 February 2005 from Ballyhalbert and has not been seen since.	
10 March 2005	Bianca Piper	13	Foley, Missouri, U.S.	Piper disappeared in Foley on 10 March 2005. Her mother dropped her off a mile from their home so she could walk back on her own, an activity recommended by Piper's therapist. However, Piper did not return home that evening and has not been heard from since.	
2 April 2005	Alfredo Jiménez Mota	25	Hermosillo, Mexico	Jiménez Mota, a journalist covering organized crime and the Mexican drug war, disappeared under mysterious circumstances in Hermosillo. In November 2005, a suspect, Raul Enrique Parra, was brutally murdered.	
15 April 2005	Ray Gricar	59	Centre Hall, Pennsylvania, U.S.	Gricar, an American district attorney, disappeared on 15 April 2005. He had called his girlfriend, in whose house he resided, from his car, giving his location east of Centre Hall. His car was found the next day, but he has not been seen or heard from since. His family had him declared legally dead in 2011. In September 2013, a reputed former Hells Angels member told authorities that Gricar was killed by the gang as retaliation. In April 2014, the Pennsylvania State Police were reported to be assuming a lead investigatory role in the case.	
18 May 2005	Rahul Raju	7	Kerala, India	Raju, a young boy from Alappuzha, went missing while playing with friends in his neighborhood. The case, which dominated media headlines since he disappeared, remains a mystery.	
30 May 2005	Natalee Ann Holloway	18	Oranjestad, Aruba, Netherlands	Holloway was an American high school graduate from Mountain Brook, Alabama who disappeared on a graduation trip on the Caribbean island of Aruba on 30 May 2005.	
22 July 2005	Jaime Seymour	21	Port Authority Bus Terminal, New York, New York, U.S.	Seymour, a New Jersey resident, was working as a sex worker in New York City. She called her parents to say she was meeting a client at the Port Authority and was not heard from again. Seymour's age, occupation, and the location of her disappearance are similar to the victims of the Gilgo Beach serial killings; she is considered a potential victim who was never found.	
30 July 2005	Masood Ahmed Janjua	30	Rawalpindi, Pakistan	Janjua, a Pakistani businessman, disappeared on 30 July 2005 along with friend Faisal Faraz while travelling from Rawalpindi to Peshawar via bus.	
10 November 2005	Rahma el-Dennaoui	1	Sydney, Australia	El-Dennaoui, a Lebanese-Australian girl, went missing on 10 November 2005. Despite a police search and appeals to the general public, no trace of her has yet been found.	
7 December 2005	Rossana Miliani	26	Cherokee, North Carolina, USA	Miliani, a hiker from Miami, Florida, was last seen on December 7, 2005, at approximately 12:00 p.m. at the Ramada Inn hotel in Cherokee, North Carolina. Miliani called her father from the hotel that day and told him she was going hiking on the Appalachian Trail. A store clerk who read about Miliani's disappearance claimed she sold a backpack to Miliani and an unidentified white man in his 60s in Bryson City, North Carolina, on December 13, 2005. Following the arrest of serial killer Gary Hilton, the store clerk contacted authorities to note the similarities between Hilton and the suspect.	

=== 2006 ===
Date	Person(s)	Age when disappeared	Missing from	Circumstances	Refs.
5 January 2006	Joe Pichler	18	Bremerton, Washington, U.S.	Pichler, a former child actor, disappeared near his hometown of Bremerton, and has not been seen since.	
23 January 2006	Jennifer Kesse	24	Orlando, Florida, U.S.	Kesse was last seen leaving her place of employment. Her last phone call was placed to her boyfriend at 10 p.m. that night. Evidence suggests she left for work the next morning but was abducted while walking to her vehicle, which was later found in another nearby apartment complex. Security cameras had filmed her car being parked, but the face of the person driving was obscured by a fence.	
22 March 2006	Gerald Foisy	Unknown	Wright Sound, British Columbia, Canada	Rosette and Foisy, a Canadian couple, were last seen onboard BC Ferries' MV Queen of the North before it sank after running aground on Gil Island. The couple did not make it to the lifeboats and are presumed to have gone down with the ship; however, their bodies were not located when the wreck was searched by a remote-operated submersible four days later, nor on another remote dive in June of the same year. One passenger also reported seeing the couple amongst the survivors in Hartley Bay during rescue efforts; however, a search of the small Aboriginal community of 200 people turned up nothing. Rosette and Foisy also did not contact relatives after the incident, and have not been seen or heard from since. The couple remain missing, presumed dead.	
22 March 2006	Shirley Rosette	Unknown	Wright Sound, British Columbia, Canada		
April 2006	Jessie Foster	21	Las Vegas, Nevada, U.S.	Foster, a Canadian woman, disappeared from the Las Vegas Valley during April 2006.	
1 April 2006	Brian Shaffer	27	Columbus, Ohio, U.S.	Shaffer, an Ohio State University medical student, was last seen on security camera footage apparently re-entering an off-campus bar shortly before its closing time. No other way was open to the public by which he could have left the bar. Police reportedly believed as of 2008 that he was still alive, and they continued to investigate at the time.	
12 May 2006	Luke Durbin	19	Ipswich, Suffolk, England	Durbin, a greengrocer and musician, disappeared under mysterious circumstances after a night out with his friends Alex and Zach. After losing contact with Zach, and having left his belongings at Alex's house where he planned to spend the night, Luke was last seen crossing Dogs Head Street at approximately 4:00 a.m. BST in an attempt to make his way back. The CCTV footage is the last positive sighting before a suspicious vehicle later deemed to have fake registration plates is spotted in the vicinity minutes later. Durbin has not been seen since.	
26 June 2006	Sherlyn Cadapan	27	Hagonoy, Bulacan, Philippines	Cadapan and Empeño, a community organizer and graduate student, respectively, were abducted by army personnel in a remote area on 26 June 2006 and have not been seen since.	
26 June 2006	Karen Empeño	20	Hagonoy, Bulacan, Philippines	Cadapan and Empeño, a community organizer and graduate student, respectively, were abducted by army personnel in a remote area on 26 June 2006 and have not been seen since.	
July 2006	Ebrima Manneh	28	Republic of Gambia	Manneh, a Gambian journalist, is believed by human rights organizations to have been arrested in July 2006, and secretly held in custody. In 2019, it was reported that he had died at some point in mid-2008.	
20 August 2006	Thiruchelvam Nihal Jim Brown	33–34	Sri Lanka	Brown, a minority Sri Lankan Tamil Roman Catholic parish priest, disappeared during the Sri Lankan civil war, and is believed to be dead.	
31 August 2006	Anthony Zizzo	71	Chicago, Illinois, U.S.	Zizzo, a high-ranking American mobster and reputed member of the Chicago Outfit, was last seen after leaving his home in Melrose Park and has not been seen since.	
18 September 2006	Jorge Julio López	77	Buenos Aires, Argentina	Argentine retired bricklayer López disappeared after testifying at trial against Dirty War criminal Miguel Etchecolatz and has not been seen since.	
19 November 2006	Ammar al-Saffar	50	Iraq	Al-Saffar, a member of the Dawa Party and the then-Deputy Health Minister of Iraq, was kidnapped by a group of armed men who wore police uniforms. In the following years, two politicians were arrested but later cleared on charges relating to his kidnapping, and he has been declared legally dead by his wife, who now lives in Britain.	
15 December 2006	Sivasubramaniam Raveendranath	55	Colombo, Sri Lanka	The Sri Lankan academic and Vice-Chancellor of the Eastern University was kidnapped and presumably murdered by Tamil Makkal Viduthalai Pulikal paramilitary operatives.	

=== 2007 ===
Date	Person(s)	Age when disappeared	Missing from	Circumstances	Refs.
2007	Ananie Nkurunziza	50s–60s	Rwanda	A former intelligence officer and radio broadcaster who worked for Radio Télévision Libre des Mille Collines, a state radio station which was notorious for supporting the Rwandan genocide, Nkurunziza's whereabouts have been unknown since 2007.	
2007	Tetsu Inoue	Unknown	Japan	Inoue, a Japanese electronic music producer who created ambient techno and lowercase music, disappeared after the release of his final album Inland in 2007.	
17 January 2007	Frood Fouladvand	66	Yüksekova, Turkey	The Iranian actor, monarchist, and founder of the Kingdom Assembly of Iran, along with two compatriots, vanished on the Turkish–Iranian border while on a mission to "liberate" Iran from the government. It is believed the three were detained by Iranian security forces.	
25 January 2007	Gerard Conway	32	Cookstown, County Tyrone, Northern Ireland	A man who disappeared after withdrawing £10 from a bank on 25 January 2007. Extensive searches in Northern Ireland, along with enquiries in the Republic of Ireland and England, found no trace of him.	
27 January 2007	Jim Gray	63	Farallon Islands, off San Francisco, California, U.S.	A computer scientist renowned for his contributions to database research, Gray disappeared during a short solo boating trip to the Farallons (near San Francisco) to scatter his mother's ashes. A massive search effort failed to find his body or any remains of his 40-foot sailboat. He was declared legally dead in 2012.	
29 January 2007	Ahmed Al-Hasan	38	Najaf, Iraq	An Iraqi Shia religious leader who went missing in the aftermath of the Battle of Najaf.	
15 February 2007	Subramaniam Ramachandran	37	Jaffna, Sri Lanka	A Sri Lankan Tamil journalist who disappeared after he was arrested by the Sri Lanka Army. He was rumoured to be held at an army camp, but his current whereabouts have never been confirmed.	
9 March 2007	Robert Levinson	58	Kish Island, Iran	Levinson, a retired U.S. DEA and FBI agent, was last seen on 9 March 2007 on Kish Island in the custody of individuals who seemed to be Iranian intelligence agents. He had gone to set up a meeting with Dawud Salahuddin, an American-born convert to Islam, ostensibly about securing the Iranian government's help in controlling the distribution of pirated American cigarettes in Iran. He was later revealed to be working for the CIA at that time. In 2010, a video of him, somewhat emaciated, was released, in which he begs for help from the U.S. government for his freedom. The U.S. government has regularly raised the issue of his release with Iran as part of talks between the countries, but Iran's statements as to whether he still is in their custody or even alive have been contradictory, and Levinson is thought to be no longer under their control. His family announced on 25 March 2020 that he is presumed dead.	
30 April 2007	Lisa Stebic	37	Plainfield, Illinois, U.S.	Stebic was last seen by her husband at their home while she was waiting for a ride to the local track where she worked out. The couple was going through a divorce at the time, and police believe foul play was involved, having called her husband a person of interest.	
3 May 2007	Madeleine McCann	3	Algarve, Portugal	McCann disappeared after being left asleep in the ground-floor bedroom of her family's rented holiday apartment, while her parents dined with friends at a local restaurant. No sightings of her have been confirmed since then. In 2014, Scotland Yard was reportedly looking at 38 people of interest, and researching the backgrounds of 530 known sex offenders, including 59 regarded as of high interest. In June 2020, the police in the German city Braunschweig identified a new suspect in McCann's disappearance, and stated that they now believe that she is dead.	
4 July 2007	Ashley Summers	14	Cleveland, Ohio, U.S.	Summers was last seen leaving a pool party. No verified sightings of her have been confirmed since then. Her uncle came under suspicion and in 2018 was charged with rape in a separate case, but has not been named a suspect in Ashley's disappearance.	
6 August 2007	Christina Calayca	20	Rainbow Falls Provincial Park, Ontario, Canada	Calayca, a Toronto daycare worker, disappeared on a camping trip in Northwestern Ontario and has not been seen since. The 17-day search triggered on the day she went missing is one of the longest ever undertaken by the Ontario Provincial Police. Investigators believe she became lost on a hiking trail, though her family contends she may have been abducted.	
12 August 2007	Shelly Miscavige	46	Riverside County, California	The spouse and personal assistant of Scientology leader David Miscavige. Last seen in public at Gold Base in June 2006, and at her father's funeral in August 2007. Police and Miscavige's attorney both say Miscavige is safe and voluntarily out of the public eye.	
12 August 2007	Lovinsky Pierre-Antoine	Unknown	Delmas, Haiti	Pierre-Antoine, a Haitian human-rights and political activist, was kidnapped on 12 August 2007 and has not been seen since.	
30 August 2007	Elodia Ghinescu	39	Brașov, Romania	Ghinescu, a Romanian lawyer, was last seen on 30 August 2007, and her disappearance was made official on 5 September the same year by Cristian Cioacă, her husband and a policeman in Brașov. Though her body was never found, a few personal belongings and a blood-stained police uniform were found 8 October 2007 in a ravine. She was officially declared missing in 2009, and Cioacă was sentenced to 22 years in jail in 2013, after being arrested in 2012. She was suggested to have been murdered due to jealousy over her affair with an SPP officer in Dubai in August 2007, a few days before her supposed disappearance; the murder took place in the bathroom of her apartment, according to neighbors. She was also supposedly going to be targeted by authorities for tax evasion.	
14 September 2007	Andrew Gosden	14	London, England	Gosden disappeared from King's Cross station. He left his home in Doncaster to go to school, but never caught the school bus, and instead returned home when the rest of the household had departed. He changed out of his school uniform and then went to Doncaster railway station, withdrawing £200 from his bank account on the way there. At the station, he purchased a one-way ticket to London despite being told that a return ticket would only cost an extra 50p. He was last seen on CCTV leaving the main concourse at King's Cross.	
28 October 2007	Stacy Ann Peterson	23	Bolingbrook, Illinois, U.S.	Peterson left her home at 11 a.m. on 28 October 2007 to help a friend paint a house, and has not been seen since. Her husband Drew, who was convicted of murdering his previous wife as a result of evidence gathered during the investigation of Stacy's disappearance, has been suspected of killing Peterson as well.	
29 October 2007	Aeryn Gillern	34	Vienna, Austria	Gillern disappeared on the evening of 29 October 2007 and has not been seen since.	
17 November 2007	Vadivel Nimalarajah	31	Jaffna, Sri Lanka	Nimalarajah was a proofreader for Jaffna-based Tamil daily newspaper Uthayan, which has been attacked several times by the pro-government paramilitary Eelam People's Democratic Party (EPDP) for independent reporting. Earlier, two employees, Suresh Kumar and Ranjith Kumar, were killed after Uthayan published a cartoon mocking EPDP leader Douglas Devananda, and there have been several such attacks. Four of its employees had been killed and its premises had been attacked several times in the previous two years.	

=== 2008 ===
Date	Person(s)	Age when disappeared	Missing from	Circumstances	Refs.
1 January 2008	Amy Fitzpatrick	15	Málaga, Spain	Fitzpatrick was last seen in Spain while on holiday from her native Ireland. She had been babysitting with a friend on 1 January 2008, and left about 10:10 p.m. that night. Fitzpatrick never arrived home, which was only a short distance away, and she has not been seen or heard from since. Her case is still under investigation, and some evidence suggests a possible kidnapping.	
9 January 2008	Sharlinie Mohd Nashar	4	Petaling Jaya, Selangor, Malaysia	Sharlinie left her family's home in Petaling Jaya, Selangor to play with her older sister at the playground and disappeared without a trace. She has never been found despite nationwide searching.	
21 January 2008	Steven Cooper	47	A86 road near Loch Laggan area, Scottish Highlands	Cooper left his home in Golcar, Huddersfield, on his 47th birthday and drove to the Scottish Highlands, where he disappeared without a trace. His car was later found near Loch Laggan, but despite extensive searches, no sign of him has ever been discovered.	
17 February 2008	Marilyn Bergeron	24	Saint-Romuald, Quebec, Canada	Bergeron left her parents' home around 11 a.m. on 17 February 2008, ostensibly to go for a walk. She attempted to withdraw money from a nearby ATM and later used her credit card to buy coffee some 20 kilometres (12 mi) from her parents' house, which was the last confirmed sighting of her.	
8 April 2008	Jamie Fraley	22	Gastonia, North Carolina, U.S.	Fraley told a friend over the phone at 1:30 a.m. on 8 April 2008 that an unidentified male friend was taking her to the hospital to seek treatment for a stomach bug. She never arrived to the hospital and has not been seen since. Two days later, her discarded cell phone was found at a nearby intersection but did not yield useful evidence. Two months later, her fiancé's father, who lived nearby and had given her a separate ride to the hospital that day, was revealed be a person of interest in her disappearance. This followed his death from heatstroke after he locked himself in the trunk of an ex-girlfriend's car in what police believe was an attempt to ambush her. In 2015, a prison inmate serving time for murder wrote a letter to a local newspaper confessing to her murder; authorities do not believe it is truthful.	
14 May 2008	Brandon Swanson	19	Marshall, Minnesota, U.S.	After attending a late-night party, Swanson drove his car into a ditch on a side road amid cornfields near his home. He called his parents for a ride; they searched for him near Lynd, 6 miles (9.7 km) southwest of Marshall, where he believed himself to be. While on the phone with his father, he suddenly said, "Oh, shit!" and the connection was lost, never to be regained. His whereabouts are unknown, though he has been suggested to have drowned in the Yellow Medicine River or died of hypothermia.	
11 July 2008	Alex Sloley	16	London, England	Sloley disappeared around midday after he visited a friend in Enfield. His family has no contact with him since he went missing.	
August 2008	Mehbube Ablesh	29–30	Ürümqi, China	Ablesh, a Uyghur political dissident, was detained in 2008 for criticizing the Chinese government's response to various disasters and treatment of Uyghurs. Although due to be released in 2011, Ablesh has not been seen since her imprisonment.	
31 August 2008	Jordan Ratcliffe	16	Manchester, England	Ratcliffe was last seen near a hostel in Northern Quarter, after he was dropped off by his aunt to visit a homeless shelter in Longsight. Despite several searches over the years, no trace of him has ever been found.	
10 December 2008	Felix Batista	55	Saltillo, Mexico	Batista was a Cuban-American former army major who specialized in anti-kidnapping operations, helping negotiate nearly a hundred cases, predominantly in Mexico. While eating in a restaurant in Saltillo, he was kidnapped by unknown assailants and has not been seen since.	

=== 2009 ===
Date	Person(s)	Age when disappeared	Missing from	Circumstances	Refs.
18 March 2009	Claudia Lawrence	35	Heworth, York, England	Lawrence was last seen at her job as a university chef; after a few phone calls that evening, she has not been heard from since. The leading police theory is she was abducted while walking to work the following day shortly after 5:00 a.m. and subsequently murdered.	
27 April 2009	Craig Arnold	41	Kuchinoerabu-jima, Japan	Arnold, an American poet, disappeared after a hike on the Japanese island Kuchinoerabu-jima. He is presumed to have died in a fall from a high cliff, but his body has not been found.	
20 June 2009	Krystal Fraser	23	Pyramid Hill, Victoria, Australia		
7 May 2009	Sunthararaj Stephan	Unknown	Colombo, Sri Lanka	Sunthararaj was a child rights activist in Sri Lanka and provided information to the U.S. embassy in Colombo that: "Children are sold into slavery, usually boys to work camps and girls to prostitution rings, through Eelam People's Democratic Party's networks in India and Malaysia. Sunthararaj maintained that children are often smuggled out of the country with the help of a corrupt Customs and Immigration official at Bandaranaike International Airport in Colombo. Sunthararaj was kidnapped just hours after he had been released from police custody while he was travelling in his lawyer's car on 7 May 2009 after he was exonerated by the court. He has been missing since."	
18 May 2009	Father Francis	Unknown	Mullaitivu, Sri Lanka	Father Francis, along with hundreds of Sri Lankan Tamils, surrendered to the Sri Lankan army on 18 May 2009. They crossed the Vattuvagal bridge from rebel LTTE held areas into a Sri Lankan government held area and boarded army buses, but were never to be seen again.	
c. May–July 2009	Marsha Brantley	50	Cleveland, Tennessee, U.S.	Brantley disappeared from her home in the summer of 2009. She is widely believed to have been murdered by her husband.	
13 August 2009	Paul Tseng	49	Lijiang, China	Tseng, a Taiwanese applied mathematician, went missing on a kayaking trip on 13 August 2009 and is believed to be dead.	
23 August 2009	Toni Sharpless	29	Penn Valley, Pennsylvania, U.S.	Sharpless was last seen by a friend she asked to get out of her car after the two were asked to leave a party due to Sharpless's belligerent behavior. A license plate reader in Camden, New Jersey recorded a hit on her car's plates two weeks later, and the anonymous writer of a 2012 letter to a private investigator claimed they had taken the car to a chop shop after Sharpless was killed during a confrontation with a Camden police officer; the letter included the last five digits of the car's VIN and Sharpless's Social Security number, both of which were correct. Neither Sharpless nor her car have been found.	
31 October 2009	Zarema Gaisanova	39–40	Grozny, Chechnya, Russia	A human rights activist and employee of the Danish Refugee Council, Gaisanova was kidnapped in Grozny by armed men during a special operation headed by the president of the Chechen Republic, Ramzan Kadyrov. She is believed to have been murdered.	
6–7 December 2009	Susan Powell	28	West Valley City, Utah, U.S.	On the morning of 6 December, Powell and her two sons attended church services, and a neighbor later visited the family around 5 p.m. Powell was never seen again outside her immediate family, although her husband Joshua claimed he had left her sleeping at home shortly after midnight on 7 December while he took the children on a camping trip. Joshua Powell was a suspect in her disappearance, but despite circumstantial evidence, he was never charged, and on 5 February 2012, he took his sons' life and his own. Authorities also believed that Joshua's father Steven knew what happened to Susan, but he died of natural causes in 2018. Susan's ultimate fate remains unknown, although before their deaths, Joshua and Steven both claimed that Susan's disappearance was connected to that of Steven Koecher in a nearby area a week later.	
13 December 2009	Steven Koecher	30	Henderson, Nevada, U.S.	Koecher was last seen on surveillance footage walking away from his car after parking it in a cul-de-sac in a retirement community in the Anthem section of southern Henderson. Pings from his cellphone, gradually moving north, were picked up as late as two days later. Koecher had driven to the Las Vegas area from St. George, Utah that morning for unknown reasons; his family believes that given his difficult financial circumstances, he was looking for a better-paying job, and intended to return later that day. Debit card records show that he had driven extensively around Utah and Nevada in the days before his disappearance for reasons that, despite a visit to a former girlfriend's family on one day, are still not clear. Theories abound from a voluntary disappearance to foul play, despite a lack of evidence suggesting any one; Susan Powell's husband and in-laws believed that her own disappearance a week earlier was connected.	

== 2010s ==
=== 2010 ===
Date	Person(s)	Age when disappeared	Missing from	Circumstances	Refs.
24 January 2010	Prageeth Eknaligoda	49	Sri Lanka	Eknaligoda, a Sri Lankan political analyst and journalist, disappeared before presidential polls took place in the country. At the time, he had been investigating the use of chemical weapons by the Sri Lankan army used against LTTE rebels in the Sri Lankan Civil War.	
2 March 2010	Russell Bohling	18	Bempton, England	Bohling disappeared after his car was found in the Bempton Cliffs car park. Police have assumed his case to be a suicide or accident, though no body has been found. His family maintain that a third party was involved, as he did not have enough fuel to drive to Bempton from his family home in West Ella. A USB stick detailing the pornographic artwork and graffiti left on the walls of the former bunker of RAF Bempton was missing, and the trainers he supposedly wore that day were found in the family's holiday home even further up the coast after he had disappeared.	
20 May 2010	Paolo Renda	70	Montreal, Canada	Renda, a member of the Rizzuto crime family, told his family he would be picking up steaks for dinner on his way back from a funeral, but he never arrived. He was presumed kidnapped after his car was found with the windows down and keys in the ignition along his route. The family believes he was killed in retaliation for his role in a 1970s murder; however, their 2013 attempt to have him declared legally dead was denied on the grounds of insufficient evidence. On 2 September 2018, the courts had reportedly declared Renda dead.	
4 June 2010	Kyron Horman	7	Portland, Oregon, U.S.	Horman, an American schoolboy, did not return from his school in northwest Portland on 4 June 2010. Multiple searches since that day have uncovered no evidence of his whereabouts.	
11 August 2010	Vasyl Klymentyev	66	Kharkiv, Ukraine	Klymentyev, an investigative journalist and the editor-in-chief of the newspaper Noviy Stil based in Kharkiv, disappeared under mysterious circumstances and is presumed dead.	
18 August 2010	Ben McDaniel	30	Ponce de Leon, Florida, U.S.	McDaniel, of Collierville, Tennessee, and a recreational scuba diver, was last seen 58 feet (18 m) under water while going into a cave that he was not certified to enter at Vortex Spring. His failure to return was not noted for another two days, and extensive searches found only two decompression tanks that were placed incorrectly and filled with the wrong gases, but no evidence of a body has been found in the spring. While his body still may be in an unexplored area of the cave, other theories include foul play that is possibly related to the suspicious 2011 death of Vortex Spring's owner, or a possible staged disappearance in the wake of McDaniel's recent marital and financial failures.	
18 November 2010	Forrest Schab	25–26	Mexico	Schab, a Canadian rapper better known by his stage name "DY", was reported missing in Mexico on 18 November 2010. He has not been seen since leaving Canada in the middle of August.	

=== 2011 ===
Date	Person(s)	Age when disappeared	Missing from	Circumstances	Refs.
28 January 2011	Alessia and Livia Schepp	6	Lausanne, Switzerland	Alessia and Livia Schepp are twin sisters who were picked up for the weekend from their mother's home by their father Mathias Kaspar Schepp on 28 January 2011. Their father was found dead a few days later, having apparently died by suicide. A suicide note he left suggests he killed them.	
3 March 2011	Rachel Funari	35	Bruny Island, Tasmania	Rachel Funari, a 35-year-old tourist, disappeared around March 3, 2011 after traveling to Bruny Island. No evidence of foul play was found and she was declared legally dead in 2012. No trace of Funari has ever been found.	
22 March 2011	Rebecca Coriam	24	Pacific Ocean	Rebecca Coriam, a 24-year-old English woman, disappeared from the Disney Wonder cruise ship during early morning hours on 22 March 2011, while the ship was near Mexico. She was last seen on CCTV footage having a distressed phone conversation at about 4 or 5 A.M. Despite investigations by Bahamian police and a settlement between her family and Disney, speculations ranged from suicide by jumping overboard or an accident, and her disappearance remains a mystery.	
11 May 2011	Timmothy Pitzen	6	Aurora, Illinois, U.S.	Pitzen was dropped off at school by his father James on 11 May 2011. However, he was picked up shortly after by his mother, Amy Fry-Pitzen, who took him on a three-day trip to various amusement and water parks. She may have handed him off to unknown persons at some point during their trip; her vehicle was found to have been parked in a grassy field for a length of time during the trip, shortly after the last time she was seen with her son, and before she was found dead by suicide in a motel room in the nearby city of Rockford, Illinois, with a note stating that Timmothy was safe, but would never be found.	
3 June 2011	Lauren Spierer	20	Bloomington, Indiana, U.S.	Spierer, a student at Indiana University, disappeared after a night of partying at a local bar. Spierer left a gathering at a housing complex alone in the early morning hours while highly intoxicated, and her disappearance generated national press coverage. In 2014, Spierer's parents filed a lawsuit against two individuals with whom Spierer had socialized on the evening before her disappearance, but a federal judge dismissed the suit.	
4 June 2011	Shibli al-Aysami	86	Aley, Lebanon	A Druze-Syrian politician and Arab nationalist, al-Aysami helped with the foundation of the National Alliance for the Liberation of Syria in 1982. Despite retiring from politics in 1992, al-Aysami was kidnapped during a visit to Lebanon, allegedly on orders of Bashar al-Assad, and is presumed dead.	
7 July 2011	Cristina Siekavizza	39	Guatemala City, Guatemala	Siekavizza disappeared on 7 July 2011, and is believed to have been murdered by her husband.	
10 September 2011	Jean-Christophe Morin	23	Albertville, France	Disappeared at the age of 23 after attending an electronic music festival at Fort de Tamié near Albertville. Shortly before vanishing, Morin is known to have told a witness by the festival entrance that he had to leave because somebody was trying to hurt him.	
4 October 2011	Lisa Irwin	10 months	Kansas City, Missouri, U.S.	Irwin, a 10-month-old girl, was reported missing from her home on the morning of 4 October 2011. Police believe she may have been abducted.	
6 October 2011	Daniel Lind Lagerlöf	42	Tanumshede, Sweden	Lagerlöf, a Swedish director and screenwriter, disappeared at Tjurpannans Nature Reserve outside Tanumshede during preparations for the filming of Camilla Läckberg's Fjällbackamorden – Strandriddaren. The search for him was suspended after two days without result.	
18 October 2011	Park Young-seok	47	Annapurna, Nepal	A South Korean mountaineer renowned for climbing some of the world's dangerous summits and trekking on both poles, Park and two team members went missing while descending Annapurna after an aborted attempt at a new travel route there, and are presumed dead.	
6 November 2011	Sky Metalwala	2	Bellevue, Washington, U.S.	Metalwala was left in a parked car by his mother on the morning of 6 November 2011 after it supposedly ran out of gas. She was on the way to the hospital, where she claimed to have been taking him after he woke up sick, and when she returned, he was gone. Upon inspection, police found that the car had plenty of fuel left and was working properly. The police publicly expressed doubts about her story, as she and the boy's father were getting divorced, and she had just withdrawn from a mediated custody agreement that gave him visitation. The case was also noted to be similar to a recently aired episode of Law & Order: Special Victims Unit, and investigators have even questioned whether Sky was in the car that morning at all. While police have indicated they could charge the mother with child endangerment, they have declined to do so due to those doubts.	
c. 11 December 2011	Joseph Xing Wenzhi	48	Shanghai, China	Xing, an auxiliary bishop for the Diocese of Shanghai, disappeared around 11 December 2011 and has not been seen since.	
17 December 2011	Ayla Reynolds	1	Waterville, Maine, U.S.	Reynolds disappeared under the supervision of her father at his home, and was discovered missing by his sister or girlfriend, both of whom were also in residence. The search for the 20-month-old was the largest missing-persons investigation in the state's history. Police have evidence from the house suggesting foul play and believe her to be dead; however, her body has not been found, and no arrests have been made.	
18 December 2011	Phoenix Coldon	23	St. Louis, Missouri, U.S.	Coldon's vehicle was discovered parked and running on a road in St. Louis, along with her personal possessions. Her whereabouts remain unknown.	

=== 2012 ===
Date	Person(s)	Age when disappeared	Missing from	Circumstances	Refs.
3 February 2012	Jonathan Spollen	28	Rishikesh, India	Spollen, an Irish journalist for the International Herald Tribune and formerly assistant foreign editor of The National in Abu Dhabi, was last seen on 3 February 2012 in Rishikesh. Around 11 March 2012, some of Spollen's belongings were found near a small waterfall halfway up the road to Phool Chatti.	
28 February 2012	Chhori Maiya Maharjan	51	Kathmandu, Nepal	Maharjan disappeared under unclear circumstances on 28 February 2012, supposedly because she owed a man named Nikki Singh money. While Singh was charged, he was later acquitted due to lack of evidence. As of 2021, the case remains unsolved.	
17 April 2012	Ilias Ali	51	Bangladesh	Ali was a Jatiya Sangsad member who disappeared with his personal driver on 17 April 2012 after he left Dhaka. Neither of them have been seen or heard from since.	
21 May 2012	Zane Plemmons	30	Nuevo Laredo, Mexico	Plemmons, a Mexican-American freelance journalist and photographer working for the newspaper El Debate, went missing after covering a shootout between rival drug cartels in Nuevo Laredo. It is believed that a drug cartel might be responsible for his disappearance.	
27 May 2012	Timothy MacColl	28	Dubai, United Arab Emirates	Leading Seaman Timothy MacColl of the Royal Navy went missing when the ship he was serving aboard was docked in Dubai. MacColl had gone out to the town and was last properly accounted for when two of his shipmates put him into a taxi to take him back to HMS Westminster. He never reboarded the ship, and witnesses claim they saw him getting into another taxi to go back into Dubai. He was declared dead (presumed drowned according to the death certificate) in 2014.	
19 June 2012	Guma Aguiar	35	Fort Lauderdale, Florida, U.S.	A Brazilian-born American industrialist and part-owner of Israel's Beitar Jerusalem football club, Aguiar was last seen leaving his home. The next day, his fishing boat, the T.T. Zion, was found with lights on and engines running, having gone aground on a local beach. Aguiar's wallet and cell phone were found to be on board. Two weeks of searches failed to find any trace of him, and he was declared legally dead in 2015.	
14 August 2012	Austin Tice	31	Darayya, Syria	Tice, a former U.S. Marine Corps officer and freelance journalist, was kidnapped while reporting in Darayya, Syria on 14 August 2012. A 47-second video of Tice blindfolded and bound was released in September 2012. His whereabouts as of 2014 are unknown.	
22 November 2012	John Cantlie	41–42	Syria	Cantlie, a British photographer and war correspondent, was kidnapped along with American journalist James Foley by ISIS militants. Unlike Foley, who was confirmed to have been beheaded, intelligence agencies believe that, as of 2019, Cantlie is still alive, and is being held as a hostage in Deir ez-Zor Governorate.	
28 November 2012	Emma Fillipoff	26	Victoria, British Columbia, Canada	Fillipoff disappeared from in front of The Empress hotel after a 45-minute conversation with Victoria Police.	
15 December 2012	Sombath Somphone	60	Vientiane, Laos	Sombath, a Laotian community activist, disappeared at a police post after having been stopped while driving his wife's car. CCTV footage showed a motorcyclist getting off his bike and driving Sombath's car away, and a white truck approaching and subsequently driving off with Sombath.	

=== 2013 ===
Date	Person(s)	Age when disappeared	Missing from	Circumstances	Refs.
2013	Paul of Aleppo	53–54	Syria	The metropolitan bishop and archbishop of the archdiocese based in Aleppo, respectively, the two clerics were abducted by ISIL militants during the Syrian civil war. Since then, neither has been located, and it has been alleged by an investigative reporter that both had been killed in 2016.	
2013	Yohanna Ibrahim	64–65	Syria	The metropolitan bishop and archbishop of the archdiocese based in Aleppo, respectively, the two clerics were abducted by ISIL militants during the Syrian civil war. Since then, neither has been located, and it has been alleged by an investigative reporter that both had been killed in 2016.	
6 March 2013	Maciej Berbeka	58	Broad Peak, Pakistan	Polish mountaineer Berbeka disappeared with his companion Tomasz Kowalski on 6 March 2013 while descending Broad Peak in Pakistan. Their bodies were never found, and both were declared dead two days later.	
5 June 2013	Federico Tobares	37	Puerto Vallarta, Mexico	Tobares, an Argentine chef, disappeared on 5 June 2013 while driving from Puerto Vallarta to Guadalajara, Jalisco, Mexico. On 10 June, a co-worker and friend of Tobares' went to the Mexican police to report his disappearance, making Tobares the first Argentine to disappear in Mexico.	
9 June 2013	Maureen Kelly	19	Skamania County, Washington, U.S.	According to friends, Kelly left her campground in the Gifford Pinchot National Forest, stating she was going on a "spiritual quest", removing her clothing and wandering into the forest with only a fanny pack containing knives, matches and a compass. She has not been seen since.	
14 June 2013	Immaculate Basil	27	Fort St. James, Canada	Basil disappeared from the Kuz Che Reservation after leaving a house party with her cousin and another man. Numerous theories exist surrounding her case, including animal attacks and being the victim of murder.	
14 July 2013	Marie-José Benitez	53	Perpignan, France	French woman Marie-José Benitez and her adult daughter Allison disappeared from Perpignan on 14 July 2013. Francisco Benitez, the husband of Marie-José and father of Allison, told police that they had traveled to Toulouse and switched their mobile phones off after a family argument, but no evidence shows that they ever left. Francisco Benitez died by suicide three weeks later after becoming the prime suspect; he was found to have led a double life involving numerous affairs, and a mistress of his had also disappeared under similarly mysterious circumstances in 2004.	
14 July 2013	Allison Benitez	19	Perpignan, France		
20 July 2013	Aidin Bozorgi	24	Broad Peak, Pakistan	Iranian mountain climbers Bozorgi, Keivan and Jarahi successfully completed climbing a new route on the Southwest Face of Broad Peak, Pakistan on 20 July 2013, which they had been working on since 2009. The group disappeared during the descent and are believed to be dead.	
20 July 2013	Pouya Keivan	24	Broad Peak, Pakistan	Iranian mountain climbers Bozorgi, Keivan and Jarahi successfully completed climbing a new route on the Southwest Face of Broad Peak, Pakistan on 20 July 2013, which they had been working on since 2009. The group disappeared during the descent and are believed to be dead.	
20 July 2013	Mojtaba Jarahi	27	Broad Peak, Pakistan	Iranian mountain climbers Bozorgi, Keivan and Jarahi successfully completed climbing a new route on the Southwest Face of Broad Peak, Pakistan on 20 July 2013, which they had been working on since 2009. The group disappeared during the descent and are believed to be dead.	
12 August 2013	Tiffany Daniels	25	Pensacola Beach, Florida, U.S.	Daniels, a theatre technician at Pensacola State College, left work early on 12 August 2013 after telling her supervisor that she would be taking the rest of the week off, as she had "some things to take care of". She returned to her home briefly afterwards, but was not seen by her housemate, who was on the phone at the time. Eight days later, her car was found in a Pensacola Beach parking lot, with witnesses reporting that they saw a man in red shorts exit the car and open its tailgate on the day it was found. No other trace of her has been found despite extensive searches, but based on a description of a woman seen at a New Orleans-area restaurant who resembled her and had some similar behaviors, her family believes she was abducted and became a victim of human trafficking.	
30 August 2013	Bryce Laspisa	19	Castaic Lake, California, U.S.	Laspisa vanished while on the way to his parents' house in Orange County on 30 August 2013. Laspisa called his mother at 2:08 a.m. and said he had pulled off Interstate 5 to rest because he was tired, and planned to sleep briefly before continuing the drive. A few hours later, the family's doorbell rang, and they initially believed Laspisa had arrived home. Instead, a California Highway Patrol officer informed them that their 2003 Toyota Highlander had been found between 4:20 and 5:15 a.m. in Castaic, Los Angeles County. The SUV had gone down a 15-foot embankment near Main Ramp Road at Castaic Lake and was discovered on its side. Laspisa's personal belongings, including his phone, wallet and laptop were in the vehicle. The rear window had been removed; investigators believed he exited through the back of the vehicle. His whereabouts remain unknown.	
13 September 2013	Tiffany Whitton	26	Marietta, Georgia, U.S.	Early on the morning of 13 September 2013, Whitton, an unemployed drug addict on parole, was stopped for suspected shoplifting just short of the exit of the Marietta Walmart, an encounter recorded by the store's security cameras. She managed to flee, leaving behind her purse and footwear; she has not been seen since. Her family and authorities suspect her boyfriend, who served a long prison sentence for drug dealing; he is considered a person of interest in the case. He denies any knowledge of her whereabouts since leaving the store, which he himself left shortly afterwards to look for her, leaving about 20 minutes of his time unaccounted for (although records do confirm his later calls to hospitals and jails to find her). In January 2014, her half-brother claimed he had received a phone call from her.	
November 2013	Elizabeth Clarke	24	Navan, Co Meath, Ireland	Clarke was last seen at the home of her ex-partner Kevin Stanley and his father Larry, who claims she left the house voluntarily when she ended her relationship with Kevin. She was estranged from her family and was not reported as missing until January 2015, when she missed her grandmother’s funeral. It is believed that she was murdered following a period of mistreatment.	
3 November 2013	Allan Bryant	23	Glenrothes, Fife, Scotland	Bryant was last seen leaving Styx nightclub in Glenrothes in the early hours of 3 November 2013 and has not been seen or heard from since. Extensive searches have found no trace of him, and police continue to treat his disappearance as a missing person inquiry, while his family believe that he was killed.	
3 November 2013	Carlos Ornelas Puga	35	Jiménez, Tamaulipas, Mexico	Puga was kidnapped by who were believed to be organized crime gunmen on 3 November 2013 in Jiménez, Tamaulipas. Four days later, a police team was sent to the area to investigate, but were attacked, leaving three officers wounded by gunfire. He has not been seen since.	
9 December 2013	Razan Zaitouneh	36	Douma, Syria	A human rights activist active during the Syrian uprising in 2011, Zaitouneh was kidnapped together with her husband and two colleagues by unidentified militants. Since then, it has been alleged that she has been killed, and investigations are still ongoing to determine whether Jaysh al-Islam members might have been involved.	
18 December 2013	Heather Elvis	20	Carolina Forest, South Carolina, U.S.	Elvis has not been seen since a date dropped her off at her apartment. A half-hour later, she called her roommate, then visiting her own family in Florida, to tell her that a married older man, with whom she had ended an affair two months earlier, had just called. Her whereabouts since then have not been conclusively established, but cell phone records and video surveillance suggest that she might have spent the next two hours attempting to meet him somewhere in the area; her car was found on the next evening parked oddly at a local boat launch where her phone's last activity had been recorded. Her lover, Sidney Moorer, and his wife Tammy were also implicated; however, murder charges against them were dropped in 2016. Sidney's 2016 trial on the kidnapping charge ended in a hung jury. Sidney has since been convicted of obstruction of justice, and Tammy of kidnapping and conspiracy to kidnap.	

=== 2014 ===
Date	Person(s)	Age when disappeared	Missing from	Circumstances	Refs.
1 March 2014	Myra Lewis	2	Camden, Mississippi, U.S.	Lewis, a 2-year-old child, went missing from outside of her home in Camden. Despite involvement by the Federal Bureau of Investigation and a considerable reward, no sign of the child has ever been found. Authorities are handling the case as a child abduction.	
8 March 2014	239 passengers and crew of Malaysia Airlines Flight 370	Various; ranging from 2 to 79	Southern Indian Ocean	Malaysia Airlines Flight 370, a flight from Kuala Lumpur International Airport with an intended destination of Beijing Capital International Airport, disappeared over the Indian Ocean. The search for the missing aircraft became the most expensive in the history of aviation. It focused initially on the South China Sea and Andaman Sea, before an analysis of the aircraft's automated communications indicated that the plane travelled over the southern Indian Ocean. Multiple searches have yielded small fragments of the plane. Although no consensus on the fate of the aircraft has been reached by investigators, various disappearance theories regarding the flight have also been reported by the media with plausible theories ranging from a hypoxia event to crew involvement.	
17 April 2014	Billy Rakchongcharoen	Unknown	Kaeng Krachan National Park, Thailand	Rakchongcharoen, a Karen environmental and community activist, was last seen in Kaeng Krachan National Park. He was arrested at a park checkpoint by park superintendent Chaiwat Limlikitaksorn and four of his men for allegedly illegally collecting wild honey in the forest. Three years earlier, in 2011, Rakchongcharoen had filed a lawsuit against Chaiwat over the May 2011 destruction and burning of houses and eviction of over 20 Karen families living in the park's Pong Luk Bang Kloy village, in the Huai Mae Phriang Sub-district of Kaeng Krachan District. No official records of his arrest or detention remain. Following Rakchongcharoen's supposed arrest, he was never seen again.	
18 June 2014	Sergei Dolgov	59	Mariupol, Ukraine	A Ukrainian journalist and advocate for neo-Soviet policies, Dolgov was kidnapped and presumably murdered by a group of six masked men. His body has never been located.	
23 June 2014	Robert Hutchinson	56–57	Hendon, Sunderland, England	Hutchinson left home at 18:20 BST and his car was found abandoned. Northumbria Police are conducting a murder investigation into the case.	
3 July 2014	Julie Betu	18	Đurđevac, Croatia	Betu, a Congolese handball player, together with two juniors from her team, disappeared from her hotel in Croatia during the 2014 Women's Junior World Handball Championship; the three have not been seen since.	
6 July 2014	Castro and Janet Bandu	32 and 24	Ada Foah, Ghana	Castro, a Ghanaian musician whose real name was Theophilus Tagoe, disappeared on 6 July 2014 while jet-skiing with Janet Bandu at the Ada Estuary near Ada Foah, Ghana. The jet ski was later recovered, but neither Castro nor Bandu was found despite search efforts. The circumstances of their disappearance remain unsolved.	
8 July 2014	Lars Mittank	28	Varna, Bulgaria	Mittank, a German tourist on holiday in Bulgaria, was last seen at Varna Airport on 8 July 2014. He was last seen on security footage entering the airport with all his luggage, and later running out of the building in panic, leaving his luggage behind, then jumping over a fence and going into a nearby forest.	
12 September 2014	William Tyrrell	3	Kendall, New South Wales, Australia	Tyrrell vanished while playing with his sister in the front yard of their grandmother's house in Kendall, New South Wales. Although police still regard it as an active case, no trace of the boy has been found. In 2023, police recommended charges against his foster mother for perverting the course of justice and interfering with a corpse.	
20 September 2014	Tammy Kingery	37	North Augusta, South Carolina, U.S.	Kingery was last seen in her home by her husband before he went out with one of their children to run errands on the morning of 20 September 2014. She had come home early from work claiming she did not feel well, and atypically for her, left behind a note saying she was going for a walk and would return soon. Her purse and phone were left behind, along with her keys, which she would have needed to lock the house, as her husband found it to be open upon his return. Police consider her disappearance suspicious.	
September–October 2014	Sabina Selimovic	16	Syria	Selimovic and Kesinovic were Austrian teenagers who left their homes to join the militant Islamic State of Iraq and the Levant (ISIS). In April 2014, they were poster girls for ISIS in Syria. There are reports that Kesinovic was beaten to death when trying to flee Syria, and Selimovic has not been seen since that time.	
September–October 2014	Samra Kesinovic	17	Syria	Selimovic and Kesinovic were Austrian teenagers who left their homes to join the militant Islamic State of Iraq and the Levant (ISIS). In April 2014, they were poster girls for ISIS in Syria. There are reports that Kesinovic was beaten to death when trying to flee Syria, and Selimovic has not been seen since that time.	
October 2014	Sim Chol-ho	54	North Korea	An engineer and former Minister of Posts and Telecommunications, Sim Chol-ho disappeared during a purge of government officials in October 2014. While it was reported that he was executed, this cannot be confirmed with certainty, and Sim remains classified as missing.	
10 October 2014	Rico Harris	37	Yolo County, California, U.S.	A former high-school basketball star and Harlem Globetrotter, Harris was last heard from when he called his girlfriend at their home in Seattle, Washington on the morning of 10 October 2014, to tell her he was going to the mountains to rest. At the time, he was north of Sacramento, California, at the midpoint of his drive back to Seattle from a visit to his family near Los Angeles. Four days later, his abandoned car was found at a park along Cache Creek. Video footage and photos on his cell phone suggest that he had arrived there sometime after his last phone call. Several possible sightings of him were reported in the area over the next week, and footprints were found near the location of his car that were large enough to belong to the 6-foot-9-inch (206 cm) Harris.	
31 October 2014	Shaun Ritchie	20	Strichen, Aberdeenshire, Scotland	Ritchie was a young Scottish man who was last seen in Strichen, Aberdeenshire on 31 October 2014.	

=== 2015 ===
Date	Person(s)	Age when disappeared	Missing from	Circumstances	Refs.
13 March 2015	John Beckenridge	64	The Catlins, New Zealand	Swedish-born New Zealander John Beckenridge breached a parenting order and picked up his 11-year-old stepson while he was attending school. Over the following week, they were located around the Catlins area of New Zealand, near Invercargill. Shortly after, they were declared missing. Their bodies have never been found.	
13 March 2015	Mike Zhao-Beckenridge	11	The Catlins, New Zealand	Swedish-born New Zealander John Beckenridge breached a parenting order and picked up his 11-year-old stepson while he was attending school. Over the following week, they were located around the Catlins area of New Zealand, near Invercargill. Shortly after, they were declared missing. Their bodies have never been found.	
14 March 2015	Yusuf and Zahra Shikder	4 and 1	Florida, United States	The children's mother, Rashida, abducted them from their Florida home while their father was out of the country, and took them to join ISIS. Rashida is known to have been killed in 2019. The children were reported to be in the care of an ISIS supporter and may still be in Syria.	
2 May 2015	Inga Gehricke	5	Saxony-Anhalt, Germany	Gehricke disappeared while gathering wood at a family barbecue. Her whereabouts remain unknown.	
28 May 2015	Dawood family	3 to 34	Bradford, West Yorkshire, England, UK	In May 2015, the three Dawood sisters (all in their 30s) and their nine collective children (age 3 to 15) left the UK, leaving the women's husbands behind. They said they were going on a pilgrimage to Saudi Arabia. Instead of returning home, they went to Turkey and then to Syria and disappeared. The Dawood sisters' brother had gone to Syria to join ISIS earlier that year. The last sign of the family was some Facebook posts by one of the women's teenage children in August 2016.	
3 July 2015	Crystal Rogers	35	Bardstown, Kentucky, U.S.	Rogers disappeared from her home, where she lived with her children and boyfriend, Brooks Houck. While her car was located a short while later, Rogers has never been found. The mysterious circumstances surrounding her disappearance on the property, and later the unsolved killing of her father, indicates she might have been the victim of a homicide. In 2023 her former boyfriend and another man were indicted on charges related to the case; police also announced the recovery of a gun possibly used in her father's death.	
24 July 2015	Perry Cohen	14	Tequesta, Florida, U.S.	Cohen and Stephanos, both 14 years old, went out fishing in an eighteen-foot single-engine 1978 seacraft out of Jupiter Island Marina. Shortly after they left, a large thunderstorm moved into the area and contact was lost with the boys. The boat was discovered abandoned on 26 July 2015.	
24 July 2015	Austin Stephanos	14	Tequesta, Florida, U.S.	Cohen and Stephanos, both 14 years old, went out fishing in an eighteen-foot single-engine 1978 seacraft out of Jupiter Island Marina. Shortly after they left, a large thunderstorm moved into the area and contact was lost with the boys. The boat was discovered abandoned on 26 July 2015.	
1 September 2015	Macin Smith	17	St. George, Utah, U.S.	Smith, a Utah teenager living with his parents in St. George, left home on the morning of 1 September 2015. He was expected to take a bus to school, but he never boarded it; a later search found his phone, laptop, passport and wallet, which contained a note, hidden in his bedroom. No confirmed sightings have been made since.	
21 September 2015	Asha Kreimer	26	Point Arena, California, U.S.	Kreimer, an Australian national living with her boyfriend in California, left her table at a restaurant during breakfast on the morning of 21 September 2015 to go to the bathroom. A friend who went there shortly afterwards did not see her; no one has seen her since.	
6 October 2015	Ameen family	Between 5 and 40	Bradford, West Yorkshire, England	Farzana Ameen, 40, and Imran Ameen, 39, left England with their children Isma Imran, 15; Moeen Imran, 14, Mohammed Muneed Imran, 11, Ismail Imran, 8, and Mohammed Imran, 5 and took a flight to Turkey. Farzana claimed she was doing what was best for the children. They never returned and are thought to have gone to Syria to join Imran's brother, who had left England in June, and may have joined the Islamic State of Iraq and the Levant.	

=== 2016 ===
Date	Person(s)	Age when disappeared	Missing from	Circumstances	Refs.
5 March 2016	Michael Vanzandt	36	Hermosa Beach, California, U.S.	Vanzandt, who lived in Lancaster, California, travelled to Hermosa Beach on 5 March 2016 for a night out and met up with friends there. While the group was waiting in line outside a bar, he told them he was going to the liquor store next door to use the restroom and became separated from them. Surveillance footage later showed him returning to look for them but unable to find them, as they had gone to another bar; he later returned to the liquor store and bought a small bottle of whiskey. His last known sighting was at 11:27 p.m., when he was recorded walking toward the beach. His whereabouts remain unknown.	
12 April 2016	Mekayla Bali	16	Yorkton, Saskatchewan, Canada	Bali, a Canadian teenager, disappeared from her hometown of Yorkton, Saskatchewan, on 12 April 2016. She was last seen at a local bus stop between 1:00 and 1:45 p.m., and despite several reported sightings, no definitive clues to Bali's whereabouts have since been found.	
19 May 2016	Logan Schiendelman	19	Rochester, Washington, U.S.	Schiendelman, a 19-year-old man, disappeared after his vehicle was discovered abandoned on Interstate 5 in Washington. One witness saw his vehicle parked on the interstate shoulder that morning, and noticed a man resembling Schiendelman with two unknown men standing outside. Later that afternoon, Schiendelman's vehicle was seen by multiple witnesses crossing several lanes of traffic (with no apparent driver) before crashing into the center median; one witness reported seeing an unknown man exit the vehicle from the passenger door and run into the woods. Schiendelman's whereabouts remain unknown.	
29 June 2016	Lucassie Etungat	65	Iqaluit, Nunavut, Canada	Etungat, an Inuk sculptor, disappeared on 29 June 2016, and was officially reported missing on 1 September 2016. Some of his belongings were found in August 2018 and police suspect that he died in a hunting accident, but his whereabouts are unknown.	
13 July 2016	Kristal Reisinger	29	Crestone, Colorado, U.S.	Reisinger, a mother of one, disappeared mysteriously on 13 July 2016 from Crestone, Colorado, and has been missing since.	
August 2016	Tracy Splinter	44	Vals, Graubünden, Switzerland	Splinter is a German-South African spoken-word author and writer who mysteriously disappeared while she was in Vals, Graubünden, Switzerland in August 2016. Splinter has not been seen or heard of since.	
6 August 2016	Darya Bulba	21	Shanghai, China	Bulba is a Ukrainian model who disappeared in Shanghai. Her disappearance became the subject of various hoaxes and versions of what had happened. Police put forward different versions of the disappearance, from suicide to kidnapping, but never reached a consensus. Her fate remains unknown.	
24 September 2016	Corrie McKeague	23	Bury St Edmunds, England	McKeague, a member of the Royal Air Force Regiment, went missing in the early hours of 24 September 2016. Despite an extensive search and public appeals, no trace of him has been found.	
30 September 2016	An Myeong-jin	47–48	China	A former North Korean government agent who defected to South Korea and worked at the National Intelligence Service. Following his retirement, he acquired a job at the Korea Gas Corporation. He disappeared while on a trip in China, presumably having been murdered by North Korean or Chinese intelligence operatives.	
15 October 2016	Najeeb Ahmed	27	New Delhi, India	Ahmed, a first-year biotechnology master's student from Jawaharlal Nehru University, disappeared under suspicious circumstances from his college campus, and has not been seen since. He is suspected to have been kidnapped by ABVP, the student wing of the ruling BJP government.	
24 November 2016	Amri Che Mat	Unknown	Perlis, Malaysia	Social activist Amri Che Mat is alleged to have been abducted by the Malaysian Special Branch for criticising the Royal Malaysia Police. As of 2020, his abduction, as well as those of other activists, are under active investigation.	

=== 2017 ===
Date	Person(s)	Age when disappeared	Missing from	Circumstances	Refs.
2017	Bird of Jannah	28-29	Raqqa, Syria	Bird of Jannah, a blogger who was never publicly named, moved from Malaysia to war-torn Syria in order to join the Islamic State of Iraq and the Levant, marry, and work as a doctor. She was last known to be living with her son in the city of Raqqa in 2017, after which point she disappeared into the fog of war.	
13 February 2017	Raymond Koh	62	Petaling Jaya, Malaysia	Koh, a Christian pastor, was abducted by a group of armed men, possibly due to his social activism or for ransom. No trace of him has been found since his kidnapping.	
13 June 2017	Ashley Loring Heavyrunner	20	Browning, Montana, U.S.	Loring Heavyrunner is a Blackfoot student who disappeared after a party on the 5th of June in the company of older friends. Her case was highlighted by the Missing and Murdered Indigenous Women movement.	
29 July 2017	Wuthipong Kachathamakul	unknown	Vientiane, Laos	Wuthipong, a Thai anti-monarchy activist, was kidnapped by 10 unknown men in Vientiane, Laos on 29 July 2017 and has not been seen since.	
8 August 2017	Zelim Bakaev	25	Grozny, Chechnya	Russian-Chechen singer Zelim Bakaev disappeared in Chechnya while on a brief visit to the region to attend his sister's wedding. He is widely believed to have been abducted, tortured, and murdered by the Chechen authorities as part of their systematic persecution of homosexuals.	
September 2017	Gao Zhisheng	53	Jiexiu, Shanxi, China	Gao is a Chinese human rights attorney and dissident known for defending activists and religious minorities and documenting human rights abuses in China. He escaped house arrest on 13 August 2017 but was recaptured the following month and has not been seen or heard from since.	
14 September 2017	Hannah Upp	32	St. Thomas, U.S. Virgin Islands	Upp, a teacher who previously went missing two separate times prior to her final disappearance in 2017, left her home to go swimming. After missing her scheduled school meeting at 8 a.m. she was reported missing. Her car and belongings were found untouched. Hannah suffered from dissociative fugue, a rare form of amnesia where a person loses knowledge of their identity and may travel or act without memory of who they are. As of 2017, she is yet to be found.	
21 November 2017	Azory Gwanda	c. 42	Kibiti, Tanzania	Gwanda, a journalist for Mwananchi Communications known for his publications investigating the murders of government officials and police officers by assailants on motorcycles, was allegedly abducted by a group of unarmed men from his house in Kibiti and has not been seen since.	
c. December 2017	Rahile Dawut	50–51	Xinjiang, China	Rahile is a professor at Xinjiang University in China's Xinjiang Uyghur Autonomous Region who disappeared in 2017; it was revealed that she was held by the authorities of the Chinese state. Her current whereabouts are unknown.	

=== 2018 ===
Date	Person(s)	Age when disappeared	Missing from	Circumstances	Refs.
26 January 2018	Tomasz Mackiewicz	43	Nanga Parbat, Pakistan	Polish high-altitude climber Mackiewicz disappeared while attempting to climb Pakistan's Nanga Parbat mountain with fellow climber Élisabeth Revol. He was left behind after feeling sick during the climb, but later on, neither he nor his body were able to be located.	
15 February 2018	Ablajan Awut Ayup	33	Ürümqi, China	An Uyghur singer known for promoting the Uyghur identity and culture, Ayup was detained by police in Guma without any reason given. According to his brother, Chinese authorities had arrested Ayup for his promotion of Uyghur and Turkic identities as a whole, and is being held at an re-education camp in Xinjiang.	
March 2018	Missing women of Afrin	Varied	Afrin, Syria	Reports emerged from March 2018 that women were disappearing in the area; over 173 women and girls went missing, and allegations of torture and sexual violence were the center of attention in these case. Although approximately 30 cases were solved, an estimated 109 women remain missing as of today.	
7 March 2018	Georgina Gharsallah	30	Worthing, West Sussex, England	Gharsallah was last seen in her home town of Worthing on 7 March 2018. She was reported missing to Sussex Police on 17 March, and the major crimes team took over the investigation on 26 March. Two men were arrested on suspicion of murder after her disappearance, but were later released with no further action. In August 2019, Sussex police announced that they were treating her disappearance as a homicide case.	
7 April 2018	Karl-Erivan Haub	58	Swiss Alps, Switzerland	The German-American son and heir of billionaire businessman Erivan Haub, and leader of Tengelmann Group, went skiing at the Matterhorn in Switzerland on 7 April 2018 alone, and did not return.	
5 May 2018	Boyan Petrov	45	Shishapangma, Tibet, China	The Bulgarian zoologist and mountaineer was declared missing on 5 May 2018 while climbing Shishapangma. The search for him was discontinued on 16 May. According to other climbers, he may have fallen into a crevasse on the way to the top.	
16 July 2018	Sarah Burton	35	Joplin, Missouri, USA	Burton was a mother of two children who disappeared in Joplin.	
29 July 2018	Tiphaine Véron	36	Nikkō, Tochigi Prefecture, Japan	Véron was a French tourist in Japan who disappeared while visiting Nikkō.	
20 August 2018	Mudassar Naaru	Unknown	Balakot, Pakistan	Pakistani poet, journalist, and blogger Naaru vanished under unclear circumstances while sightseeing with his family and has been missing since.	
20 August 2018	Arjen Kamphuis	46	Bodø, Norway	Kamphuis, a Dutch cybersecurity expert and hacktivist, presumably drowned during a kayaking trip in Norway. His body has not been found.	
September 2018	Joseph Mifsud	57–58	Italy	Mifsud is a Maltese academic who was declared missing in September 2018. The media has claimed that he was in Rome as of April 2019, but this has not been proven. His whereabouts are unknown.	
December 2018	Surachai Danwattananusorn	75	Vientiane, Laos	Thai political activist and former political prisoner Surachai was the last communist to be pardoned in Thailand, and has been in exile in Laos following the 2014 Thai coup d'état. His spouse last heard from him in December 2018 when he was in Vientiane. The bodies of two of his aides were found in the Mekong river later that month.	

=== 2019 ===
Date	Person(s)	Age when disappeared	Missing from	Circumstances	Refs.
9 February 2019	Jón Jónsson	41	Dublin, Ireland	Jónsson had come to Dublin to participate in the Dublin Poker Festival when he disappeared less than 24 hours later. He was last spotted on CCTV passing the entrance to the Highfield Hospital. His whereabouts and condition remain unknown.	
17 February 2019	Rebecca Reusch	15	Berlin, Germany	Reusch is a teenage German girl who disappeared from Berlin, Germany on 17 February 2019. She has not been seen since and is thought to have been killed.	
24 May 2019	Jennifer Dulos	50	New Canaan, Connecticut, U.S.	Dulos went missing from New Canaan, Connecticut on 24 May 2019 and has not been seen since. Authorities suspect that she was murdered.	
31 May 2019	Théo Hayez	18	Byron Bay, New South Wales, Australia	Belgian backpacker Hayez disappeared on his way back to his youth hostel from a nightclub. Phone data tracked him to Cape Byron.	
26 August 2019	Od Sayavong	34	Bangkok, Thailand	Od is a Lao human rights activist who vanished shortly after telling his housemate that he was returning home for dinner. Od was living in Thailand as a refugee, and human rights organisations have accused the Lao and Thai governments of playing a role in his enforced disappearance.	
16 September 2019	Dulce Maria Alavez	5	Bridgeton, New Jersey, U.S.	Alavez is an American girl who vanished on 16 September 2019 while near a playground, and is believed to have been kidnapped. As of December 2020, no trace of her has been discovered.	
October 2019	Abdurehim Heyit	57	Ürümqi, China	Uyghur folk singer and composer Abdurehim Heyit was arrested by Chinese government agents in March 2017 for supposedly harboring anti-government sentiments in one of his songs. Turkish authorities confirmed that he was under house arrest on 25 July 2019, but as of October 2019, Abdurehim has not been located; there are allegations that he was tortured to death.	
17 November 2019	Marshal Iwaasa	26	Lethbridge, Alberta, Canada	A Canadian man who disappeared after 17 November 2019 and whose truck was found burned near Pemberton, British Columbia six days later on 23 November.	

== 2020s ==
=== 2020 ===
Date	Person(s)	Age when disappeared	Missing from	Circumstances	Refs.
26 March 2020	Owen Harding	16	Saltdean, England	Harding left his home in Saltdean, England on 26 March 2020 to watch the sunset in Telscombe and has not been seen since.	
6 May 2020	Dylan Ehler	3	Truro, Nova Scotia, Canada	Ehler disappeared from his home while playing near a river. He has not been located; his case generated public outrage over police response.	
4 June 2020	Wanchalearm Satsaksit	37	Phnom Penh, Cambodia	Wanchalearm, a Thai pro-democracy activist living in exile in Cambodia, was abducted by armed men outside his home in Phnom Penh on 4 June 2020. He has not been seen since.	
21 December 2020	Dane Elkins	21	Castaic, California, U.S.	Elkins, a professional racquetball player, was last seen near Interstate 5 and Templin Highway in the area of Castaic, California, at about 8:20 P.M., where his car was found abandoned with a flat tire, according to the Los Angeles Police Department.	

=== 2021 ===
Date	Person(s)	Age when disappeared	Missing from	Circumstances	Refs.
7 January 2021	Maya Millete	39	Chula Vista, California, U.S.	Millete was last seen on 7 January 2021 in Chula Vista, California. Her husband Larry was charged with her murder in October 2021 and convicted on 9 July 2026, but her body remains missing.	
3 February 2021	Cynthia Bah-Traore	39	Grandview, Texas, U.S.	Bah-Traore, a mother of two, was last seen near a gas station in Grandview, Texas on the night of 3 February 2021. Her phone and vehicle were later recovered, though Bah-Traore herself remains missing.	
8 March 2021	Sarm Heslop	41	U.S. Virgin Islands	Heslop disappeared from a yacht near the island of Saint John in the U.S. Virgin Islands in March 2021.	
27 April 2021	Anna Zimmermann	1	Tenerife, Spain	Anna Zimmermann was kidnapped along with her sister Olivia by their biological father Tomás Antonio Gimeno Casañas, who allegedly murdered both at his house in Igueste de Candelaria. Olivia's body was found off the coast of Santa Cruz de Tenerife on 10 June, but Anna's body has not been found.	
May 2021 – 4 March 2022	2021–2022 Luzon sabungeros disappearances	Varied	Luzon, Philippines	From May 2021 to roughly ten months later, around 34 cockfighting fans or participants disappeared from Luzon without a trace, where they are believed to have gone to watch a cockfighting event. One of the disappeared is known to have been kidnapped by a group of men in Laguna. None have been located.	
23 June 2021	Daniel Robinson	24	Buckeye, Arizona, U.S.	Robinson was last seen leaving a job site in Buckeye, Arizona in his Jeep. The Jeep was later found crashed with some of his personal belongings about 3 miles (5 km) away.	
26 June 2021	Ikran Tahlil Farah	24	Mogadishu, Somalia	Somali civil servant Ikran, who worked for the NISA cybersecurity department, was supposedly abducted and killed by Al-Shabaab militants. The group denied responsibility; Ikran's body has not been located.	
20 December 2021	Lina Khil	3	San Antonio, Texas, U.S.	Khil disappeared on 20 December 2021 from San Antonio, Texas while at the playground of the Villas Del Cabo apartments and has not been seen since.	
June 2022	Unnamed mother and three children	Varied	Vermont, U.S.	The unnamed mother and her three children were said to live on a farm owned by actor Ezra Miller. The four reportedly disappeared and could not be located in August 2022, when the police attempted to serve the mother an emergency care order that would result in the children's removal from her care and from Miller's property due to safety concerns. Vermont police also said Miller's actions were consistent with an attempt to "evade service" of the court's order.	

=== 2022 ===
Date	Person(s)	Age when disappeared	Missing from	Circumstances	Refs.
1 June 2022	Kyran Durnin	6	Drogheda, Republic of Ireland	Durnin was last seen in June 2022, when his school was told he would not return after summer and would be going to live in Northern Ireland. Tusla stated that they had received no referral for his safety between then and 2024. He was reported missing on 30 August 2024. The Garda Síochána are investigating his disappearance, and by October 2024 had declared it a murder case.	
29 October 2022	Levi Davis	24	Barcelona, Spain	English rugby union player Davis was last seen on 29 October at a Barcelona pub, and reported missing in November when his former rugby club appealed for information on his whereabouts.	

=== 2023 ===
Date	Person(s)	Age when disappeared	Missing from	Circumstances	Refs.
18 March 2023	Noof Al Maadeed	27–28	Doha, Qatar	Al Maadeed, a young Qatari woman, disappeared on 18 March 2023; this date marks her final post on social media. She is believed to be held against her will or killed by her family. Qatari authorities have not cooperated with international requests for more information.	
12 October 2023	Catherine Camilon	26	Lemery, Batangas, Philippines	Miss Grand Philippines 2023 candidate and teacher Camilon, from Tuy, Batangas, was reported missing after being last seen on 12 October 2023 in Lemery.	

=== 2024 ===
Date	Person(s)	Age when disappeared	Missing from	Circumstances	Refs.
4 February 2024	Samantha Murphy	51	Ballarat, Victoria, Australia	Murphy is an Australian woman who disappeared from Ballarat, Victoria, on 4 February 2024. She was on a morning jog in the forest near Ballarat, and has not been seen since.	
25 February 2024	Heimnot Kassau	9	Safed, Israel	Haymanut, an Ethiopian-Israeli girl, disappeared from the Safed reception center on 25 February 2024 after she went out with her friends to distribute flyers for one of the candidates in the local authority elections.	
19 June 2024	Taylor Casey	41	Paradise Island, The Bahamas	Casey, a trans woman, disappeared from a yoga retreat on Paradise Island of The Bahamas.	
11 August 2024	Bodo Hell	81	Dachstein Mountains, Austria	The Austrian author used to spend summers guarding sheep in the Austrian mountains. He was reported missing on 11 August 2024 and officially declared a missing person in September 2024.	
8 November 2024	Julia Chuñil	72	Máfil, Chile	Chuñil is a Chilean environmental activist who disappeared under unclear circumstances on 8 November 2024 after going to look for lost animals with her sheepdog.	

=== 2025 ===
Date	Person(s)	Age when disappeared	Missing from	Circumstances	Refs.
6 March 2025	Sudiksha Konanki	20	Punta Cana, Dominican Republic	Sudiksha is a University of Pittsburgh student who on 6 March 2025 disappeared from the Riu República hotel and has not been seen since.	
2 May 2025	Lilly Sullivan	6	Pictou County, Nova Scotia, Canada	Siblings Lilly and Jack Sullivan disappeared from their home on 2 May after having been absent from school on both that day and the previous day. They have not been seen since.	
2 May 2025	Jack Sullivan	4	Pictou County, Nova Scotia, Canada	Siblings Lilly and Jack Sullivan disappeared from their home on 2 May after having been absent from school on both that day and the previous day. They have not been seen since.	
22 June 2025	Monica Reza	60	Los Angeles County, California, U.S.	On the morning of June 22, 2025, Reza disappeared while hiking in the Angeles National Forest. Reza was last seen smiling and waving about 30 feet behind her hiking companion before she suddenly vanished.	
12 July 2025	Sam Beal	29	Virginia Beach, Virginia, United States	Beal left home in Kentwood, Michigan, borrowed his girlfriend's car, and drove to Virginia Beach, his last known location and where the car was recovered with his personal belongings.	
27 September 2025	Gus Lamont	4	Yunta, South Australia, Australia	Lamont disappeared from his family's remote homestead on 27 September 2025, leaving no trace. He has not been seen since.	

=== 2026 ===
Date	Person(s)	Age when disappeared	Missing from	Circumstances	Refs.
31 January 2026	Nancy Guthrie	84	Tucson, Arizona, U.S.	Nancy Guthrie, the mother of Today co-anchor Savannah Guthrie, was reported missing from her home in the Catalina Foothills area north of Tucson, Arizona, in February 2026. She was last seen on the evening of January 31, and authorities later stated that evidence at the residence led them to treat the case as a criminal investigation.	
27 February 2026	Neil McCasland	68	Albuquerque, New Mexico, U.S.	Retired USAF Maj. Gen. McCasland, 68, was last seen at his Albuquerque home on Feb. 27. At 10 a.m. that day, a repairman was at McCasland's home and interacted with him. At 11:10 a.m., McCasland's wife left the house for a medical appointment. When she returned home at 12:04 p.m., McCasland was absent. She reported him missing that afternoon. His phone was left behind at the house, but his wallet, a .38 caliber revolver and leather holster, and a red backpack are unaccounted for.	

== See also ==
- List of fugitives from justice who disappeared
- List of kidnappings
- List of murder convictions without a body
- List of people who disappeared mysteriously (pre-1910)
- List of people who disappeared mysteriously (1910–1970)
- List of people who disappeared mysteriously (1970s)
- List of people who disappeared mysteriously (1980s)
- List of people who disappeared mysteriously (1990s)
- List of people who disappeared mysteriously at sea
- Lists of solved missing person cases
- Enforced disappearance
- List of unsolved deaths
