= Mehbube Ablesh =

Uyghur journalist (born 1979)

- Born: 1979
- Disappeared: August 2008 (aged 28–29)
- Other name: Mehbube Abrek
- Occupations: Journalist; radio employee
- Known for: Political prisoner

Mehbube Ablesh (born 1979 – disappeared August 2008) is a Uyghur journalist who worked for the Chinese government–run Xinjiang People's Broadcasting Station until her firing and arrest in 2008. She had been a vocal online critic of the Chinese authorities, particularly in regard to how they handled the 2008 Beijing Summer Olympics and the 2008 Sichuan earthquake. She was due to be released in 2011, but her current whereabouts are unknown.

== Biography ==
Ablesh was born in 1979. In August 2008, she was dismissed from her role in the advertising department of the Xinjiang People's Broadcasting Station, which is based in the regional capital Ürümqi. After her dismissal, she was arrested by police on charges relating to her blogging and her criticisms of the Chinese authorities. This reportedly including criticisms of the tightened security during the 2008 Beijing Summer Olympics, and the Chinese government's handling of donations from Uyghurs to victims of the 2008 Sichuan earthquake. Criticism levelled at Ablesh after she was imprisoned included the fact that she was a Muslim woman who did not wear a headscarf. She was detained at Xinjiang Number 2 Prison. PEN America argued that her detention by Chinese authorities violated Article 19 of the International Covenant on Civil and Political Rights.

Ablesh was due to be released from prison in 2011, but as of 2015 her whereabouts are unknown.

== See also ==
- List of people who disappeared mysteriously (2000–present)
