= Lucassie Etungat =

Inuk sculptor

- Born: Lucassie Etungat; April 15, 1951; Pangnirtung, Nunavut, Canada
- Disappeared: June 29, 2016 (aged 65); Iqaluit, Nunavut, Canada
- Status: Missing for 10 years and 22 days
- Occupation: Sculptor
- Known for: Having his art held at several museums

Lucassie Etungat (April 15, 1951–missing since June 29, 2016) is a Canadian Inuk sculptor.

== Early life ==
Etungat was born on April 15, 1951, in Pangnirtung, Nunavut.

== Career ==
His work is held at several museums, including the University of Michigan Museum of Art, the National Gallery of Canada, and the Montana Museum of Art and Culture.

== Disappearance and aftermath ==
Etungat was last seen on June 29, 2016, and was reported missing on September 1, 2016. At the time, he had been living in Iqaluit.

In July 2018, two fishermen found Etungat's identification card and jacket on Long Island in Koojesse Inlet. A 2019 article reported that the RCMP believe that he died in hunting mishap, but this is unconfirmed.

== See also ==
- List of people who disappeared
