= Disappearance of Louise Kerton =

Mysterious disappearance of a British woman

Louise Kerton
- Born: May 17, 1977 (age 48); Sheffield, UK
- Disappeared: July 30, 2001; Aachen Hauptbahnhof, Aachen, Germany
- Status: Missing for 24 years, 7 months and 8 days
- Parents: Phil Kerton (father); Kathleen Kerton (mother)

Louise Kerton is a British woman from Broadstairs, Kent, United Kingdom, who went missing in Germany in July 2001. At the time of her disappearance she was a student nurse.

== Background ==
Louise Kerton, the daughter of Phil and Kathleen Kerton, had four siblings: a younger sister, two older sisters and an older brother. She was born prematurely at 27 weeks and spent 8 to 10 weeks in an incubator. She had an artistic side and teachers were puzzled that she was attentive but had difficulty presenting work, describing it as a mess. She was diagnosed with dyslexia. She had attended the same school as murder victim Lucie Blackman and was friendly with her.

She was living with her boyfriend Peter Simon in Broadstairs at the time of her disappearance.

== Disappearance ==
She spent five weeks with Peter's family in Straßfeld near Bonn after failing nursing exams. Peter had travelled to the UK two days before she was to pick up some building materials. Peter's mother Ramona said she had dropped her off at Aachen Hauptbahnhof on 30 July 2001. Louise had planned to take a train to Ostend and then travel to Dover.

=== Investigation ===
German police treated her disappearance as routine - they received unconfirmed reports that she was living in a hostel for the homeless in Aachen.

Her father believes that authorities were slow to act as she was 24 and therefore considered an adult. He said her disappearance was out of character.

In late 2001 her family hired Bob Moffatt, a former Scotland Yard Superintendent as a private investigator. They have also hired Dai Davies, a former head of royal protection. Moffatt and her family have criticised the Simon family for failing to cooperate with police and for alleged inconsistencies in their statements. The Simon family deny her disappearance has anything to do with them.

Police found photos on film in her camera at Peter's home in Germany. When developed they showed scenes that police believe had been photographed in a village in the region of Bad Zwischenahn.

As of late 2010 or early 2011 German police had closed the case.

Her mother died of stomach cancer in 2011.

The Simon family have moved out of Straßfeld.

== See also ==
- List of people who disappeared mysteriously (2000–present)
