= Disappearance of Lina Khil =

2021 missing child case in Texas, United States

Lina Sardar Khil
- Born: February 20, 2018 (age 8); Afghanistan
- Disappeared: December 20, 2021
- Status: Missing for 4 years, 8 months and 7 days

Locations
1 Blumel Road, San Antonio

Lina Sardar Khil, born February 20, 2018, disappeared on December 20, 2021, from the playground of the Villas Del Cabo apartments in San Antonio, Texas. At the time, she was three years old, last seen wearing a black jacket, red dress, and black shoes. Her family reported her missing that day. The FBI and local law enforcement led the search efforts for Khil.

Her father worked with the United States Army, and the family came to the United States on a special visa.

== Developments ==
Extensive searches by local and federal authorities, including the FBI, have yielded no credible leads. In December 2022, law enforcement released surveillance footage of her last known whereabouts. In April 2023, Khil's father took a polygraph examination from the Federal Bureau of Investigation to clear his name. In 2024, the San Antonio Police Department declined assistance from investigators at the National Center for Missing & Exploited Children. Eagle’s Flight Advocacy & Outreach has supported the search for Khil.

=== Age-progressed images ===
In 2023, an age-progressed sketch was released. Lois Gibson did the sketch. In 2024, the National Center for Missing & Exploited Children released an age-progressed image of Lina.

=== Tips ===
In February 2024, a tip led authorities to search a wooded area near Interstate 10 and Wurzbach Road, about a mile from where Lina disappeared. After two days, SAPD determined the tip was not credible.

=== Media ===
Her disappearance was featured in a documentary on Paramount Plus.

=== Reward ===
A $250,000 reward existed for information on her safe return. The reward was increased to $280,000.

== See also ==
- List of people who disappeared mysteriously (2000–present)
