= Disappearance of Ashley Summers =

2007 disappearance in Ohio, United States

Ashley Summers
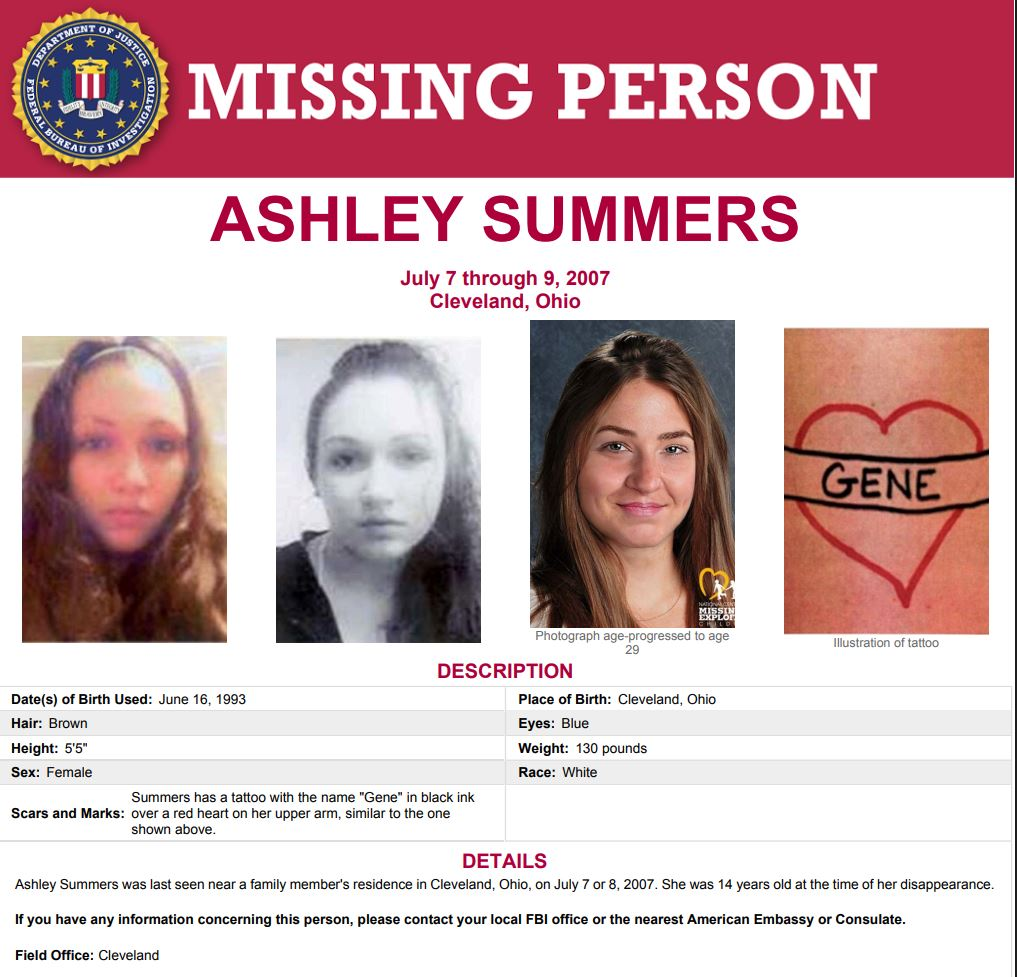
- Ashley Summers FBI Missing Poster
- Born: Ashley Nicole Summers; June 16, 1993; Cleveland, Ohio, United States
- Disappeared: July 4, 2007 (aged 14); Cleveland, Ohio, U.S.
- Status: Missing for 18 years, 8 months and 4 days

Ashley Nicole Summers (born June 16, 1993) was 14 years of age when she disappeared near her home in Cleveland, Ohio in early July 2007. Her whereabouts remain unknown, as there have not been any verified sightings of Summers since her disappearance.

== Disappearance ==
Summers was last seen at around 6:00 p.m. on July 4, 2007, in the area of West 96th Street and Madison Avenue. Earlier that day, Summers went to a pool party at a relative’s house. After spending a few hours swimming in the pool, she decided to visit her aunt Christina, who lived within a 10-minute walking distance away from the pool. She never arrived. Because she was frequently staying with her relatives, her disappearance went unnoticed until two days later.

Her great-uncle Kevin Donathan said that during an argument with Ashley on the morning of her disappearance, he grabbed her phone and broke it. Thus she no longer had any way to contact her family or friends.

At the time of her disappearance, Ashley had a tattoo of a heart and the word "Gene" in reference to Gene Gill, a boy whom she was dating at the time.

== Investigation ==
Police initially considered Summers a runaway, due to her history with her family in the weeks leading up to her disappearance, including the rebellious act of getting a tattoo without her mother's permission. However, her family disagreed and a week after she disappeared they banded together to search the neighborhood and surrounding areas for her. The FBI later speculated that she may have been kidnapped and that her disappearance might have been related to those of Amanda Berry and Gina DeJesus, who vanished in Cleveland in 2003 and 2004, respectively.

On May 6, 2013, Amanda Berry and Gina DeJesus were found alive and rescued from a house on Seymour Avenue. Police also found a third captive, Michelle Knight, who had been missing since 2002. Although Berry and DeJesus were well-known almost as soon as they disappeared, Knight received very little, if any, attention prior to their rescue and was absent from the FBI's missing persons database for most of the time she spent in the house. There was initially speculation that Summers may have also been a captive in that house, but no evidence of this was ever found.

On June 16, 2013, family and friends of Summers celebrated her twentieth birthday by passing out fliers and releasing balloons at West 110th and Lorain Avenue.

On November 7, 2018, police and the FBI visited Holmden Avenue, a location that Summers was known to visit. Authorities looked behind a home on Holmden Avenue, and uncovered new information on possible times and locations at which Summers might have been spotted before she disappeared.

In 2025, Special Agent Cristin McCaskill of the FBI said, "We believe there is an individual out there who has information, and that individual could really hold the piece of information that could break this whole thing open," and "[if] you have a piece of information, or you remember talking to Ashley back then, or you remember hearing something about maybe where she went or what happened, please call us."

== Reported sightings ==
In August 2007, one month after Summers went missing, her family received a phone call from a girl, believed to be Summers herself, telling them not to worry and that she was safe.

In early 2015, there were rumors that Summers had been spotted at an ATM in Rhode Island. The rumors were dismissed later that year, on July 6, 2015, two days after the eighth anniversary of her disappearance, when the FBI determined that the woman in the picture was not Summers.

== Legal proceedings ==
On December 4, 2018, Kevin Donathan was charged with rape, but has not been named a suspect in Summers' disappearance. On February 25, 2020, Donathan, 55, was sentenced to 35 years in prison on charges of rape and prostitution.

== Cultural significance ==
Summers was featured in a section of the show Oprah in October 2009, along with other missing people, including Sabrina Aisenberg and Jacob Wetterling, who disappeared in 1998 and 1989, respectively. Wetterling was found dead in 2016.

== See also ==
- Ariel Castro kidnappings
- List of people who disappeared mysteriously (2000–present)
