= Disappearance of Michael Vanzandt =

American man missing since 2016

Michael Vanzandt
- Born: Michael David Vanzandt; January 17, 1980; Michigan, U.S.
- Disappeared: March 5, 2016 (aged 36); Hermosa Beach, California, U.S.
- Status: Missing for 10 years, 8 months and 4 days
- Height: 6 ft (183 cm)

On March 5, 2016, Michael David Vanzandt, a 36‑year‑old U.S. Air Force veteran from Lancaster, California, disappeared in Hermosa Beach after becoming separated from friends during a night out. While the group was waiting in line outside a bar, he told them he was going to use the restroom in a nearby liquor store; surveillance footage later showed him returning to the area after they had gone into another bar. He was last seen on camera at 11:27 p.m., walking alone toward the beach. Despite searches by family members, volunteers, and local authorities, no trace of him has been found, and the case remains unsolved.

== Background ==
Michael David Vanzandt was born on January 17, 1980, and grew up in Pleasant Lake, Michigan. His parents divorced when he was two years old, and he was primarily raised by his mother. He had two brothers and a stepbrother. Vanzandt developed an interest in the military early in life and chose to pursue it as a career. He enlisted in the United States Air Force after graduating from high school in 1999.

In January 2000, while stationed in Japan, he met the woman who would later become his wife; she was also from Michigan. They married in October 2001 and had three children. By 2006, Vanzandt had been transferred to Edwards Air Force Base near Lancaster. He completed two tours in Iraq and served for 12 years before transitioning to civilian life in 2011, taking a human resources position with the Air Force. He and his wife separated in 2014. Vanzandt was in a relationship with a woman from July to December 2015.

== Disappearance ==
On the afternoon of March 5, 2016, Vanzandt had lunch with his children at about 3 p.m. before driving to Hermosa Beach to meet a coworker and her friends for an evening out to watch mixed martial arts fights. During the drive, he spoke with his brothers and his former girlfriend. He parked his vehicle in the garage at the Quality Inn hotel, where his friend had rented a room so the group would not have to drive home later, and took an Uber to The Underground Pub & Grill at 7 p.m. to meet her.

At 10 p.m., the group left that bar and continued to other establishments along the waterfront. At 10:15 p.m., while they were waiting in line outside American Junkie, Vanzandt told his friend he was going to use the restroom at the liquor store next door. Surveillance footage showed him entering the store but leaving shortly afterward. Investigators have suggested he may not have been able to find or use a restroom there, as he then continued southbound on Hermosa Avenue, possibly looking for another one.

During this period, his friend tried calling and texting him to let him know that she and the others were going into the bar next door. CCTV later recorded the group leaving the line to head there. Seconds after they walked away, Vanzandt appeared on camera returning toward the line area and seemed to be looking for them, but they had already gone. Later in the night, another camera captured him only a short distance behind the group as they continued bar‑hopping, though he and the others did not appear to notice each other.

He eventually returned to the liquor store, where he purchased a small bottle of whiskey. Footage also showed him attempting to turn on his phone, but the screen did not illuminate, leading investigators to believe the battery had died, which would explain why he did not respond to calls or texts from his friend. The final known image of him was recorded at 11:27 p.m., showing him walking toward the beach.

== Search efforts and aftermath ==
In the days following Vanzandt's disappearance, his wife, his former girlfriend, and two of his brothers assisted in the search. They coordinated volunteer efforts from a hotel in Hermosa Beach, distributing missing‑person flyers and walking the beach in an attempt to locate any trace of him. No belongings linked to Vanzandt were found. A fundraising campaign supported the search, helping cover costs for equipment such as a drone used to survey the shoreline, and additional aerial searches were conducted by helicopter.

Vanzandt was a swimmer and scuba diver, and according to his family, he enjoyed being in the water, particularly when he had been drinking. They said that on previous occasions he had gone for a swim late at night after consuming alcohol, and they considered the possibility that he may have done so on the night he disappeared.

In 2024, human remains were discovered on Rat Beach, a short distance south of Hermosa Beach. In 2025, the remains were identified as those of Raymond Simeroth.

== See also ==
- List of people who disappeared mysteriously (2000–present)
