= Zarema Gaisanova =

Chechen human rights activist

- Born: 1969; Checheno-Ingush ASSR, Soviet Union
- Disappeared: October 31, 2009 (aged 39–40); Grozny, Chechen Republic, Russia
- Status: Missing for 16 years, 6 months and 6 days
- Occupation: Worker for Danish Refugee Council

Zarema Gaisanova (c. 1969) is a native Chechen human rights activist that disappeared on October 31, 2009. She was kidnapped in Grozny, Chechnya by group of armed men during a special operation headed by president of Chechen Republic, Ramzan Kadyrov. According to her colleagues, she was abducted and possibly murdered.

The international logo for Danish Refugee Council

== European Court of Human Rights ruling ==
On May 12, 2016, the European Court of Human Rights (ECHR) has issued a ruling to compensate €60,000 for Zarema Gaisanova's mother, Lida Gaisanova. ECHR decided that Russia violated several articles of the European Convention on Human Rights, and state officials are responsible for the abduction and probable death. ECHR found: Article 2 (right to life), Article 3 (prohibition of torture and inhuman or degrading treatment), Article 5 (right to liberty and security) of the European Convention on Human Rights had been violated.

== See also ==
- List of kidnappings
- List of people who disappeared mysteriously (2000–present)
