= Timothy Verne Perryman =

American missing person from Los Angeles

Coordinates: 34.167704°N 118.760894°W

- Born: December 5, 1950
- Disappeared: March 28, 2004 (aged 53); Agoura Hills, California United States
- Status: Missing for 22 years, 5 months and 11 days
- Height: 5 ft 9 in (1.75 m)

Timothy Verne Perryman (born December 5, 1950) is a missing person. He was last seen March 28, 2004 near his home in Agoura Hills, a Los Angeles, California suburb.

Tim Perryman earned his BA from USC, and at the time of his disappearance had recently earned his MBA from California Lutheran University. He was a leader in a local Eagle scouts group, an avid hiker, and a car racing fan, who had once worked at the Ontario Motor Speedway.

== Disappearance ==
On Sunday March 28, 2004, Perryman, then aged 53, had taken a drive in the family car. Between 6 and 8 pm. that evening, Perryman's family noticed that his car was parked in the driveway in front of their Agoura Hills residence, but there was no sign of Perryman.

He had last been seen walking away from his house on Garden Oaks Ct. by neighbors walking south on Daylight Drive, at approximately 2pm. He apparently took his driver's license with him but removed other items from his wallet, as he left six dollar bills, some coins, credit cards, his Social Security card and family photos on his desk. His disappearance sparked additional urgency, as he suffers from chronic heart and kidney problems. His family suspects that his disappearance may be tied to anger and depression he'd been experiencing due to his poor health and recent financial problems.

Perryman's family speculated that the avid hiker might have walked into the Santa Monica Mountains. Local police and the National Park Service searched for Perryman, to no avail. Helping in the search for Perryman, nearly 200 concerned members of the community, including many Boy Scouts, searched local hiking trails and rural roads.

He has been described as 5' 9", 185 lbs, with brown hair and hazel eyes. He was last seen wearing a light blue-and-white striped, long-sleeved dress shirt and jeans. As of 2018, the case remains unsolved. His Los Angeles County Sheriff's Department missing person's case number is 04–0189022.

== See also ==
- List of people who disappeared mysteriously (2000–present)
