= Disappearance of Owen Harding =

2020 missing person

Owen Harding
- Born: 13 May 2003
- Disappeared: 26 March 2020 (aged 16); Saltdean, England
- Status: Missing for 6 years, 6 months and 13 days
- Height: 6 ft 0 in (183 cm)

On 26 March 2020, Owen Harding, a 16‑year‑old British teenager, disappeared from Saltdean, England. Nothing has been heard from him since. He left home after an argument with his mother and was later seen on CCTV walking towards the cliffs. It is believed that he may have been attempting to walk to his girlfriend's house in Pocklington, Yorkshire.

== Background ==
Harding was described at the time as being roughly 6 ft in height and having short dark brown hair. He was usually seen wearing tracksuit bottoms, dark‑coloured hoodies and white trainers.

According to Harding’s mother, Stella, he was a valued member of the local community. From his school teachers and college friends to the people he played football with, Harding was respected by those who knew him.

== Disappearance ==
Harding and his mother had an argument shortly before he went missing, at around 6 pm on 26 March 2020. He had been struggling with the prospect of not being able to see his girlfriend, who lived 280 mi (450 km) away in Pocklington, Yorkshire, due to the national lockdown during the COVID-19 pandemic.

After the argument, Harding left the family home, heading to Telscombe where he intended to watch the sunset, according to his mother, He did not return home and nobody who knew him has received any contact from him since. It is believed that he may have been attempting to walk the 280 miles to his girlfriend's house in Pocklington, Yorkshire.

== Investigation ==
Two witnesses reported to Sussex Police that they saw a boy who matched Harding's description at roughly 6:15 pm and 6:30 pm walking beside the A259 road. CCTV placed him in Bannings Vale at roughly 6.50 pm. Searches were carried out at the cliffs in Saltdean and Telscombe. CCTV released by Sussex Police showed two people whom officers urged to come forward as they believed they might have witnessed something relevant to the inquiry.

Further CCTV footage showed Harding walking directly towards a path along the cliffs. His girlfriend said she spoke to him on the phone while he was heading in that direction. His phone could not be reached from around 6:23 pm. His mother has not ruled out the possibility of a tragic accident. Simon Boxall, an oceanographer, estimated that due to the weather conditions that day and the low tide, it was likely a body would have been carried out to sea.

Alasdair Henry, the detective chief inspector leading the investigation, released information indicating that Harding's phone may have been in Bromley or the West Wickham area of London.

Harding's mother appeared on the Channel 4 documentary The Year Britain Stopped. She said she believes that if it had not been for the first lockdown in 2020, her son would probably still be here today.

== See also ==
- List of people who disappeared mysteriously (2000–present)
