= Disappearance of Niamh Maye =

2002 disappearance of Australian woman

Niamh Maye
- Born: June 21, 1983 (age 43)
- Disappeared: March 30, 2002 (aged 18); Jingellic, New South Wales, Australia
- Status: Missing for 24 years, 7 months and 6 days
- Known for: Missing person
- Website: missingniamh.au

On March 30, 2002, Niamh Maye, an 18-year-old woman, disappeared in New South Wales, Australia. She was last seen near Jingellic and was planning to catch a bus from Batlow to the train station at Cootamundra, but never made the trip.

== Background ==
Originally from Armidale, Maye was on a gap year before starting university. On February 16, 2002, around 6 weeks before her disappearance, Maye and her two friends traveled to Batlow for a fruit-picking working holiday.

== Disappearance ==
On March 29, 2002, Maye went camping to Jingellic. She was accompanied by another fruit picker, Jason Nicklason, who traveled in a distinctive black hearse. They left Jingellic together on March 30. Maye was not seen again after that date, with Nicklason being the last person to see Maye alive.

== Death of Jason Nicklason ==
In September 2002, six months after the disappearance of Maye, Jason Nicklason was arrested in Brisbane for the rape of a 19-year-old woman. While in police custody outside Brisbane police headquarters, Nicklason jumped from a third storey car park and died as a result.

== Search efforts ==
On June 21, 2023, the Riverina Police District announced an AU$250,000 reward for information leading to an arrest and conviction regarding to the disappearance of Maye.

A podcast on her disappearance was released in 2024 in the hopes of generating any new information on the case.

== See also ==
- List of people who disappeared mysteriously (2000–present)
