= Disappearance of Rachel Funari =

Unsolved 2011 disappearance of American woman in Tasmania

Rachel M. Funari
- Born: December 18, 1975
- Disappeared: March 3, 2011 (aged 35); Bruny Island, Tasmania
- Status: Missing for 15 years, 8 months and 13 days, declared legally dead May 18, 2012

Rachel M. Funari (December 18, 1975 – disappeared March 3, 2011; declared dead May 18, 2012) was a 35-year-old American woman who disappeared while vacationing on Bruny Island, Tasmania in March 2011. The disappearance was noted as one of Tasmania's highest-profile missing persons cases.

== Background ==
Funari, an American magazine editor, moved to Canberra in 2001. She founded the online publication Lip Magazine (not to be confused with the Australian journal published 1976–1984 of that title) in 2003 targeted to young women and teen girls as an alternative to Dolly and Girlfriend. After separating from her husband, in 2005, she moved to Melbourne and studied at Melbourne University. At the time of her disappearance, she worked in the department of the premier of Victoria and was expecting to receive a call about a possible new journalism job.

== Disappearance ==
Locations
1 Adventure Bay, Bruny Island, Tasmania - last known location and holiday cabin where belongings of Funari were left

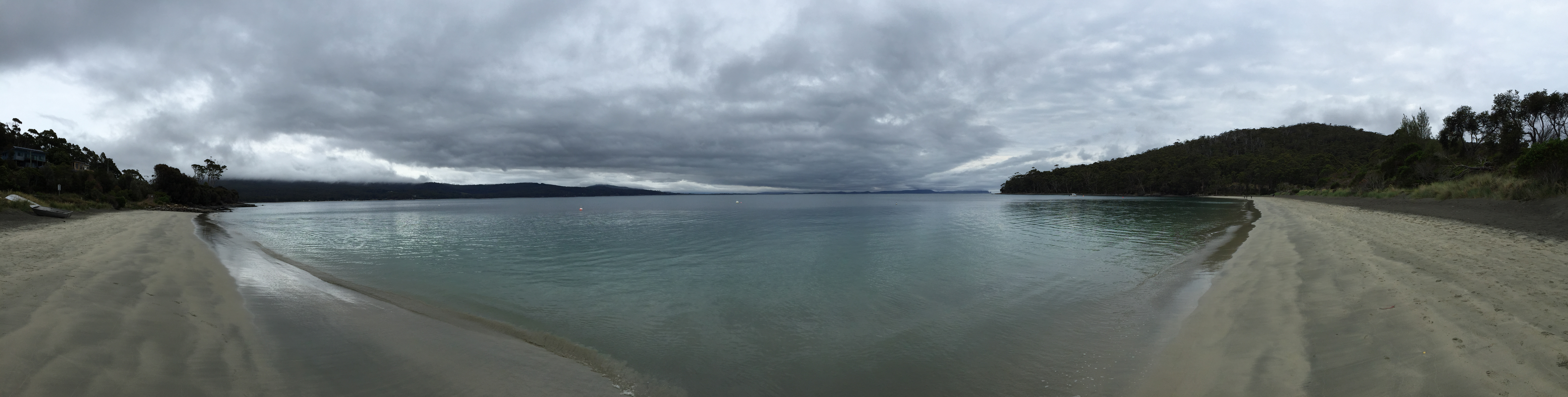
Grass Point Track, Adventure Bay

Funari booked a trip to Tasmania in 2011, leaving Melbourne on March 1. On March 9, her friends, having heard nothing from her for days, reported her as missing to police. The subsequent search was narrowed to Bruny Island and after an article was published in a local Tasmanian newspaper about her disappearance, local resident Gordon Young contacted police stating that Funari had stayed in his holiday cabin on the island; the subsequent search of the cabin revealed her backpack and personal effects were still there and the bed had not been slept in. According to Young, he and his teenage daughter, Sarah, had met Funari at a cafe in Hobart and she had ridden to Bruny Island with them in their car on March 3. Originally planning to camp, the cold and wet weather prompted her to instead accept the Young's offer to stay in their holiday cabin in Adventure Bay. After eating lunch, the Youngs returned to Hobart after which Funari was not seen again. Police focused their attention on nearby hiking trails, following knowledge that she had discussed hiking a 2.5 hour trail beginning on a beach near the cabin which follows a path along high, steep cliffs, and had worn light clothing consistent with going for a short walk.

An extensive land, sea and air search was begun which turned up no trace of Funari, or any of her clothing or items she was carrying with her on that day, including a small bag and a disposable camera. No evidence of foul play was found and the 2012 coroner's report states Funari "probably died in bushland or in the waters surrounding Bruny Island", however no trace of her has even been found.

== Legacy ==
Lip Magazine named their Rachel Funari Prize for Fiction after Funari. Lip ceased publication after 2023.

Funari's story was revisited in a 2018 article about a number of "bushwalkers" who have gone missing and were never found.

== See also ==
- List of people who disappeared mysteriously (2000–present)
