= Disappearance of Amber Cates =

2004 unsolved disappearance

Amber Cates
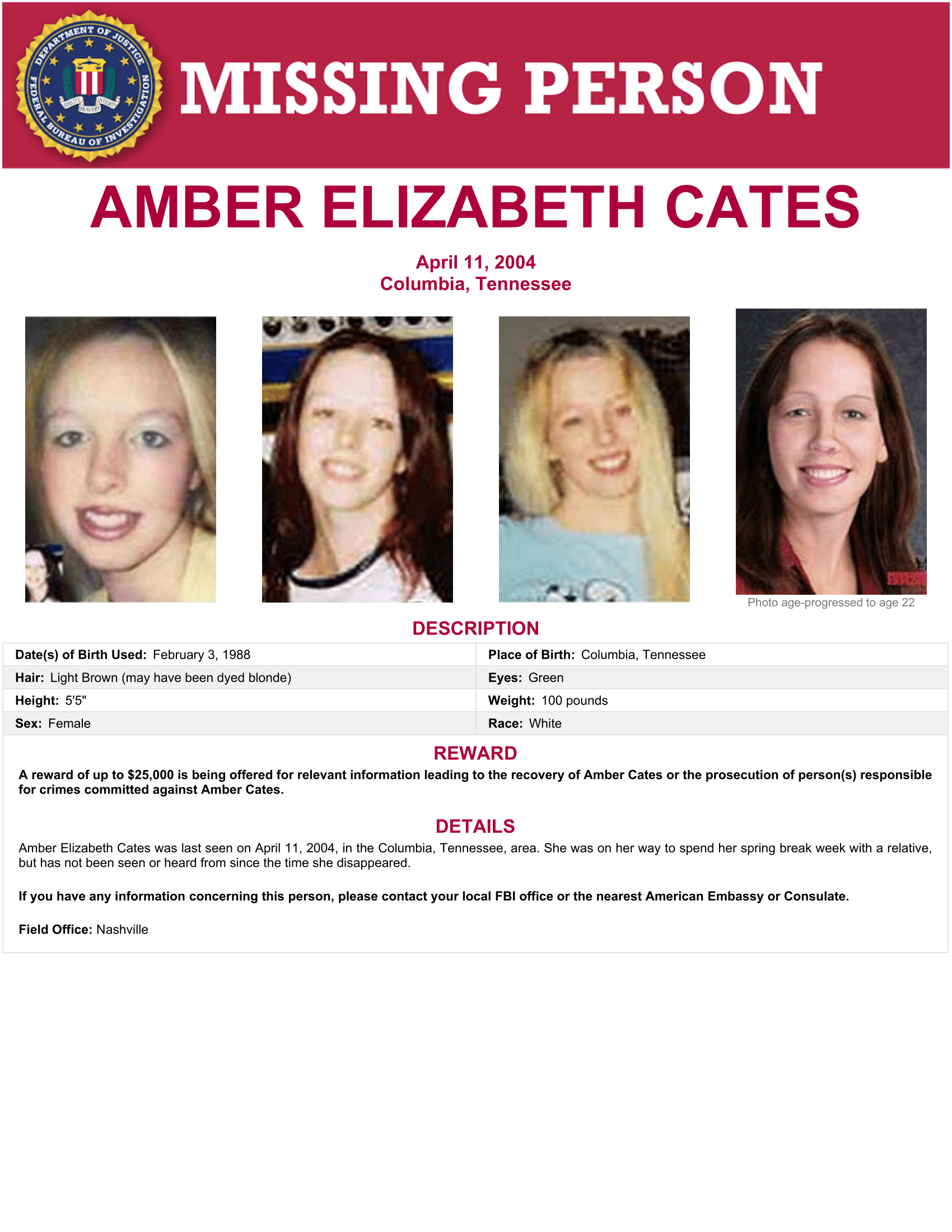
- Missing poster from Federal Bureau Investigation
- Born: Amber Elizabeth Cates; February 3, 1988 (age 38); Columbia, Tennessee
- Disappeared: April 11, 2004
- Status: Missing for 22 years, 6 months and 15 days
- Height: 5.5 ft 0 in (168 cm)

Amber Elizabeth Cates disappeared on April 11, 2004, at age 16 in Columbia, Tennessee. She has green eyes and blonde hair.

She was last seen leaving with her friend James Gordon in a gold Mazda, with plate number PFB-200. Amber planned to spend spring break with a relative but never arrived. Authorities initially classified her as a runaway due to her history, but the lack of contact or activity on her records raised concerns. Gordon reportedly dropped Cates off with another friend, Ronald "California" Inzurriaga, who claimed he dropped her off at a Columbia, Tennessee garage after purchasing hair dye. He was interviewed by authorities from a federal prison in Alabama.

Investigations have provided no significant leads. Amber's half-sister, Brenda James, noted Amber's association with a risky crowd before her disappearance. In 2017, her sister hired private investigators to work the case. James has advocated for awareness about her sister's case. The Federal Bureau of Investigation is involved in the case. The FBI offers a $25,000 reward for information leading to Amber's recovery or prosecution of those involved.

In March 2024, Maury County authorities announced a major lead, sending evidence for analysis. Despite this, the case remains unsolved.

== Background ==
Amber Elizabeth Cates was born in Spring Hill, Tennessee on February 3, 1988. She lived in several states before returning to Tennessee and residing in a foster home. A few days before her disappearance, her older half-sister Brenda James had become her legal guardian. James told authorities that Cates had become involved with drugs, and believes Cates is deceased.

== See also ==
- List of people who disappeared mysteriously (2000–present)
