= Disappearance of Maureen Kelly =

Unsolved 2013 disappearance in the United States

Maureen Kelly
- Born: Maureen Leianuhea Kelly; September 26, 1993
- Disappeared: June 9, 2013 (aged 19); Canyon Creek Campground, Gifford Pinchot National Forest, Cougar, Washington, U.S.
- Status: Missing for 13 years, 1 month and 3 days
- Other name: Anu
- Height: 5 ft 7 in (1.70 m)

Maureen Leianuhea "Anu" Kelly (September 26, 1993 – disappeared June 9, 2013) is an American missing person who disappeared at the age of 19 on the evening of June 9, 2013. She was last seen at Canyon Creek Campground, located in Gifford Pinchot National Forest in Cougar, Washington.

According to a group of friends who were at the campground with Kelly, she stated that she was going on a "spiritual quest" before removing her clothes and walking into the woods wearing only a fanny pack containing a small knife, matches, and a compass. She has not been seen or heard from since.

== Background ==
Maureen Leianuhea "Anu" Kelly was born on September 26, 1993. At the time of her disappearance, she was a resident of Vancouver, Washington. According to an undersheriff, Kelly had spoken about going on a "spiritual quest" for some time prior to her disappearance, and her peers felt that this was something she needed to do.

Kelly's half-sister described her as "a very laid-back, carefree girl" and an affectionate person, stating that Kelly had called her shortly before heading into the forest to ask if she could borrow camping gear. A friend of Kelly stated she was not surprised that Kelly had gone on a "spiritual quest", though she was concerned that Kelly had entered the woods alone and without any clothing. Kelly's brother described her as comfortable and capable with the outdoors, though he expressed concern with the way she left, as well as her not informing anyone about when she planned to return.

Kelly had a YouTube channel on which she would post videos of herself playing ukulele and beatboxing. Her last video was uploaded two days before her disappearance.

== Disappearance ==
Locations
1 June 9, 2013 – Canyon Creek Campground, last sighting of Maureen Kelly alive.
2 August 2024 – Big lava bed, unidentified human remains found where Kristopher Zitzewitz disappeared in 2013.

On June 9, 2013, Kelly had been with a group of friends at Canyon Creek Campground in Gifford Pinchot National Forest in Cougar, Washington, when she informed them that she was going on a "spiritual quest" and would be back by midnight. She subsequently removed her clothes, including her shoes, before walking into the woods wearing only a fanny pack containing a small knife, matches, and a compass. Kelly was last seen at approximately 5:00 p.m. that evening, heading toward the woods in a creek.

Although Kelly's friends expected her to return within a few hours, she never did, and they reported her missing early the following morning.

== Investigation and developments ==
An extensive search for Kelly proved unsuccessful, though authorities were able to determine that she had crossed Canyon Creek and headed north toward Forest Service Road 54, as they discovered bare footprints that appeared to match the size of Kelly's feet. K9 units were brought in to help locate Kelly, though they were unable to pick up a trace.

Authorities do not suspect foul play in Kelly's disappearance. Moreover, there was no indication that Kelly was under the influence of drugs at the time of her disappearance. Due to the low temperatures in the area on the night of her disappearance, as well as the fact that she had not been wearing any clothes, it is believed that Kelly likely succumbed to hypothermia. However, Kelly's body was never located, and her case remains unsolved.

In August 2024, human remains were discovered in Gifford Pinchot National Forest, and are believed to be those of Kelly or Kristopher Zitzewitz—a 31-year-old hiker from Oregon who disappeared in October 2013 after becoming separated from his hiking partner—though this has not been confirmed.

== See also ==
- List of people who disappeared mysteriously (2000–present)
