= Wuthipong Kachathamakul =

- วุฒิพงศ์ กชธรรมคุณ
- Disappeared: 29 July 2017; Vientiane, Laos
- Status: Missing for 8 years, 6 months and 14 days
- Occupation: anti-monarchy activist
- Known for: mysterious kidnapping

Wuthipong Kachathamakul (Thai: วุฒิพงศ์ กชธรรมคุณ), commonly known as Ko Tee (Thai: โกตี๋), is a Thai anti-monarchy activist. Wuthipong was abducted in 2017 from his home in Vientiane, Laos, and has been missing since.

== Activism ==
Wuthipong hosted a popular anti-monarchic internet radio show. He fled Thailand to Laos following the 2014 military coup.

== Abduction ==
On 29 July 2017, Wuthipong was abducted and forced into a car by 10 Thai-speaking men from his home.

== See also ==
- List of people who disappeared mysteriously (2000–present)
