= Felix Batista =

US Army officer (kidnapped 2008)

- Born: Felix I. Batista; Houston, Texas, United States
- Disappeared: 10 December 2008 (aged 55); Saltillo, Coahuila, Mexico
- Status: Missing for 17 years, 9 months and 9 days
- Children: 5

Felix I. Batista (disappeared 10 December 2008) is a Cuban-American anti-kidnapping expert and former U.S. Army major who has negotiated resolution to nearly 100 kidnapping and ransom cases, dozens of them in Mexico. Batista was a consultant for Houston, Texas-based security firm ASI Global. In December 2008, he was kidnapped in Mexico.

== Kidnapping ==
On 10 December 2008, Batista was kidnapped outside a restaurant in Saltillo, Coahuila, Mexico by unknown assailants while there to speak and give anti-kidnapping advice.

Batista was working as a negotiator to secure the release of a friend of his, while he was in a restaurant with several other people he received a phone call advising that the victim had been released and a car was being sent for him. As Batista left the restaurant, he was forced into a Jeep by a group of four people who had been waiting for him.

Since then, no one has had any communication with him and no one has ever claimed responsibility for his kidnapping as of September 2026.

A statement from Batista's family said there was no sign of violence at the scene.

Nearly eight years after his abduction, evidence suggests that Batista was killed shortly after being kidnapped and that his body was incinerated in the rural area of Agua Nueva, near Saltillo. His remains were allegedly reduced to ashes and dispersed along a nearby highway.

According to multiple testimonies, reportedly from several detained individuals and cooperating witnesses within the criminal organization, the kidnapping was ordered by local cartel leadership who viewed Batista as a potential threat due to his anti-kidnapping expertise. These testimonies were gathered over time from suspects held in Mexican prisons, where some provided detailed accounts of the operation, including surveillance of Batista before the abduction, the use of vehicles to rapidly extract him, and his transfer to a rural area near Agua Nueva.

Witness statements converge on the claim that Batista was killed within hours of the kidnapping, rather than being held for ransom, suggesting the objective was elimination rather than negotiation. The same testimonies describe how those involved attempted to destroy all physical evidence by incinerating the body using fuel in an isolated location, then dispersing the remains. The actors identified across these accounts include direct perpetrators (kidnappers and guards), mid-level coordinators managing logistics, and higher-level figures who allegedly issued the order. While exact numbers of participants vary by testimony, the structure described is consistent with organized criminal cells operating in the region at the time.

The report suggests that investigative progress depended heavily on these testimonies because the destruction of remains eliminated key forensic evidence. It also notes that inconsistencies exist between different statements, particularly regarding the exact sequence of events and number of participants, which is common in cases relying on confessions from incarcerated individuals. Despite this, authorities consider the overlap between accounts sufficient to establish a probable narrative of events.

== See also ==
- List of people who disappeared mysteriously (2000–present)
