= Robert Hutchinson (missing person) =

Missing person

Coordinates: 54.9002°N 1.36807°W

- Disappeared: 23 June 2014 (aged 56–57); Hendon, Sunderland
- Status: Missing for 11 years, 8 months and 11 days
- Children: 1

Approximate location car found

Robert Hutchinson is a man from Hendon, Sunderland, United Kingdom, who disappeared on 23 June 2014.

== Disappearance ==
He left his home on 23 June 2014 at 18:20 BST in a blue Nissan Micra. The car was found in Stewart Street, just off Chester Road, the following day.

His family reported him missing three days later.

== Murder investigation ==
Northumbria Police considered the disappearance as a possible murder as early as July 2014. Two men, aged 39 and 55 were arrested and bailed by then.

Crimestoppers UK offered a reward of £3,000 for information that might help in the murder investigation.

In 2017, a reward of £10,000 was offered by Crimestoppers for information. Nobody had been charged in relation to his disappearance by that date.

In 2019, police released CCTV of people on Chester Road around the time of his disappearance. By then, three men had been arrested, but none charged.

In 2020, his daughter Paula Hutchinson issued an appeal for anyone with information about her father to get in touch, including anonymously. She said it was very much out of character for him to not be in contact with his family for such a long time as he loved them so much.

== See also ==
- List of people who disappeared mysteriously: post-1970
