= Disappearance of Shaun Ritchie =

2014 disappearance case in Scotland

Shaun Ritchie
- Born: 16 May 1994; Scotland
- Disappeared: 31 October 2014 (aged 20); Strichen, Aberdeenshire
- Status: Missing for 11 years, 4 months and 4 days

Shaun Ritchie (born 16 May 1994) is a Scottish man who disappeared and was last seen in the Strichen area of Aberdeenshire, Scotland, on Friday 31 October 2014.

== Disappearance ==
Ritchie was 20 years old at the time of his disappearance. He was last seen running from a farmhouse near a woodland area outside Strichen, Aberdeenshire, between Strichen and the A98 Fraserburgh to Banff road, where he had travelled with seven friends for a party. Later that same night, two phone calls were made from the Greenburn area to the police – one call asking the police to come to a farm in the aforementioned area for help, and a second call canceling the request. Five days later, some of Shaun's clothing was found; a belt, trainers and a hooded top, but Shaun himself has remained missing to this day.

Ritchie's father, Mr. Charlie Reid, is critical of the investigation by Police Scotland and has stated his belief that Ritchie was killed over a debt. Mr. Reid is offering a £5,000 reward for anyone who can help him find his son. Likewise Shaun's mother, Carol-Ann, as well as Shaun's sister, Nicole, believes that Shaun was murdered.

== Aftermath ==
As of 31 October 2019, Ritchie's disappearance remains a missing person inquiry and police have stated: "there is no evidence to suggest that Shaun has been the victim of any crime". However, renowned forensic expert professor Dave Barclay, a forensic science lecturer at Robert Gordon University in Aberdeen, has stated that he believes that the police are probably unofficially treating the case as a murder and that “The most likely option, considering all the effort they have put in to find the body, brings me to agree with Shaun’s dad. It could be an offence of violence where someone has deliberately concealed the body... The police seem to be treating it as a ‘no body murder’.”

== Documentary ==
On October 31, 2021, a documentary Missing From The Broch: The Disappearance of Shaun Ritchie was released by The Press and Journal and Evening Express. The 40-minute film sheds fresh light on Shaun's case regarding a disturbance at Kersiehill Farm the night he disappeared. The documentary interviews police officers and forensic scientists who helped lead the search for Shaun, and also speaks to his family about their seven year search for answers.

== See also ==
- List of people who disappeared mysteriously: post-1970
