= Disappearance of Gerard Conway =

2007 disappearance in Northern Ireland

Gerard Conway
- Conway in the last confirmed sighting before his disappearance
- Born: 11 June 1974
- Disappeared: 25 January 2007 (aged 32); Cookstown, County Tyrone, Northern Ireland
- Status: Missing for 19 years, 9 months and 25 days
- Height: 6 ft (183 cm)

On 25 January 2007, Gerard Conway, a 32‑year‑old man from Cookstown, County Tyrone, Northern Ireland, was last definitively identified on CCTV withdrawing £10 from a bank in the town. He disappeared thereafter. Several people later recalled possible sightings around the end of January and the beginning of February, but none were confirmed.

His family reported him missing on 13 February, after which extensive searches were carried out in Northern Ireland, and further enquiries were made in the Republic of Ireland and England. His whereabouts remain unknown.

== Background ==
Gerard Conway was born on 11 June 1974, the eldest child in his family, and lived in Cookstown, County Tyrone, Northern Ireland. His interests included English, history, and politics, and he was known to enjoy singing and dancing. He had been diagnosed with bipolar disorder, and his mother later said that "there is no way Gerard could be alive without the medication he needs". Conway had one child.

== Disappearance ==
Conway was last confirmed to have been seen on 25 January 2007, when CCTV recorded him inside a bank in Cookstown, where he withdrew £10. Several acquaintances later recalled seeing him in late January and again in early February, but none of these accounts were verified. His family reported him missing on 13 February.

=== Investigation ===
After Conway was reported missing, police carried out searches and enquiries in Cookstown and the surrounding rural areas, using specialist dogs and aerial support, before extending their enquiries to the Republic of Ireland and England. In the early stages of the case, further unconfirmed sightings were reported in Magherafelt, Toome, and Ballymena. The investigation also involved cooperation with the Garda Síochána because of the family's links in the Republic of Ireland, but no further information emerged.

The family contacted people who had previously associated with Conway and distributed posters around Cookstown as part of their efforts to gather information. Conway's mother offered a £10,000 reward for information about his whereabouts, and increased it to £100,000 six months after his disappearance.

In April 2017, police searched a property in the Ardboe area after receiving new information. The operation, which involved victim‑recovery dogs and ground‑penetrating radar, did not produce any findings.

In June 2020, police carried out a search in the Drummond Wood area of Cookstown, but the operation did not yield any results.

=== Inquest ===
An inquest into Conway's disappearance opened in February 2025. At the outset, the coroner stated that he was "satisfied" that Conway was deceased. The hearing reviewed statements taken from relatives during the original investigation.

One statement, given by Conway's mother in 2007, explained that he had occasionally left home after disagreements but had always returned. It also described him as someone whose behaviour could be unpredictable and who had a reputation for being confrontational. The hearing was told that Conway had experienced several "fits" in 2006 but had declined medical treatment at the time.

Conway's uncle told the coroner that he believed Conway had been killed. He said he was "baffled" by the disappearance and referred to Conway's associations with individuals involved in drugs. He added that he did not regard suicide as a likely explanation, arguing that Conway's body would probably have been found if that had occurred. He also expressed concern about Conway's mental health and suggested that he may have confronted the wrong person during a period of instability.

The inquest also examined accounts from individuals who believed they may have seen Conway on the evening after his last confirmed sighting. One account came from a taxi driver who had given a statement to police in 2007. He reported travelling from Ardboe towards Cookstown on 26 January 2007 and noticing a man walking along Clare Lane in the dark, whom he believed to be Conway. He intended to look for the man on his return journey so that he could offer him a lift, but the man was no longer present when he passed the same location approximately 10 minutes later. He assumed that Conway had either been collected by someone else or had gone to visit relatives in the area. He did not reconsider the incident until learning, some weeks later, that Conway had been reported missing.

Another account was provided by a resident of the Clare Lane area. In a statement later given to police, she recalled hearing repeated knocking at her door at about 9.45 pm on the last Friday of January 2007. As she was not expecting visitors, she looked out of a window and saw a man with short, dark hair, around six feet tall, who appeared impatient before walking away. As he moved along the road, two cars travelling in the same direction passed him shortly afterwards, and she was concerned that he might not have been visible to the drivers. She did not report the incident at the time, but after seeing media coverage about Conway's disappearance, she considered that the man she had seen might have been him. She contacted his family, and the police subsequently took a formal statement.
