= Disappearance of Marsha Brantley =

American disappearance case

Marsha Brantley
- Born: Marsha Ellen Rader; February 28, 1959 (age 67)
- Disappeared: c. May–July 2009; Cleveland, Tennessee, U.S.
- Status: Missing for 17 years, 1 month and 24 days
- Spouse: Donnie Brantley

Marsha Ellen Brantley (née Rader; born February 28, 1959) was an American woman who disappeared around May to June 2009. She is believed by local law enforcement to have been murdered by her then-husband Donnie Brantley, but no direct evidence has ever been found to prove this. Multiple investigations have failed to determine a cause of disappearance. The case was featured in an April 2018 episode of the CBS documentary show 48 Hours.

== Background ==
Brantley was originally from Illinois. At the time of her disappearance, she lived in Cleveland, Tennessee. She married Donnie Brantley on March 28, 2000. She was an amateur writer, and was fond of her dogs and outdoor activities. She was also a former director of housing at Lee University. Friends and family members reported that Brantley suffered from depression.

== Disappearance ==
In late 2008, friends began to suspect that Brantley's marriage was troubled, despite her claims to the contrary. In March 2009, friends reported that Brantley said that she was "so depressed she couldn't get off the couch." In July or August 2009, one of Brantley's neighbors reported that she had not seen Brantley for a long time and that Brantley had apparently not been doing her regular activities. Shortly thereafter, Brantley's hairdresser inquired to Donnie Brantley about his wife's whereabouts and was told that she had left, and that they were divorcing.

== Investigation ==
In 2009, the Tennessee Bureau of Investigation began investigating the case. Donnie Brantley later told authorities that Marsha Brantley had voluntarily left them, but a search of her home determined that her car, cell phone, clothes and many of her other valuable belongings had been left behind. Investigators determined from cell phone records that Brantley most likely disappeared around June 2, 2009, possibly as late as July. In 2011, the Bradley County Sheriff's Office became involved, and in November 2012, the Brantleys’ home was searched again, this time with cadaver dogs.

In July 2013, a grand jury indicted Donnie Brantley for the murder of his wife. In August 2013 Donnie Brantley was arrested and charged with murder. The charges were dismissed in May 2014 due to lack of evidence. In October 2016, Brantley was again arrested in Kingston, Georgia. He was charged for the murder in December 2016. The charges were dropped again in February 2018 due to lack of evidence.

In a 2019 interview, prosecutor Steve Crump said, "I don't believe we have the wrong guy," and "I've been very plain that we're not gonna stop [the investigation] and so, whatever he [Donnie Brantley] feels — relief or whatever he may feel — I wouldn't get accustomed to it."

== Aftermath ==
An episode of the CBS series 48 Hours documenting the case, titled "Missing Marsha", debuted on April 7, 2018. The episode cites financial incentives as a possible motive for Brantley's murder.

== See also ==
- List of people who disappeared mysteriously: post-1970
