= Disappearance of Jordan Ratcliffe =

2008 missing person case in England

Jordan Ratcliffe
- Born: 13 October 1991
- Disappeared: 31 August 2008 (aged 16)
- Status: Missing for 17 years, 11 months and 23 days

Jordan Ratcliffe disappeared from Manchester on 31 August 2008 when he was 16 years old.

== Background ==
Ratcliffe grew up in Moston, Manchester. He was described as being well-known and well-liked and supported Manchester United F.C. He attended the North Manchester school for boys.

Ratcliffe was white, medium build, 5 feet 7 inches (1.70 m) tall with brown eyes and short ginger hair.

== Disappearance ==
On 31 August 2008, at 4:45pm Ratcliffe was dropped off by his aunt, Kimberley Pierce, outside a hostel on Tib Street in the Northern Quarter, Manchester city centre. Pierce instructed Ratcliffe to call her once he was settled, though he never did. This is the last confirmed sighting of Ratcliffe. Ratcliffe was due to visit the Men's Direct Hostel in Longsight, a homeless shelter, but he never arrived.

Ratcliffe was believed to be carrying a backpack containing a packet of crisps and five pounds cash. At the time of his disappearance Ratcliffe was wearing black trainers, black Nike tracksuit bottoms and a grey and black jacket.

== Subsequent events ==
As Ratcliffe's family had not immediately expected to hear from Jordan they did not report him missing until 8 September 2008.

In 2010 a British Transport Police PCSO stopped a young man matching Ratcliffe's appearance on Waterloo who told the officer that he was from Manchester.

In 2014 police visited Portsmouth following a reported sighting, however no information was found relating to Ratcliffe.

In 2015, computer generated imagery of what Ratcliffe would look like was released to the public.

In April 2017, Ashton Canal was drained as part of the search for Ratcliffe, though no body was discovered.

== See also ==
- List of people who disappeared mysteriously: post-1970
