= Disappearance of Darya Bulba =

Disappearance of a Ukrainian woman in 2016

Darya Bulba
- Дар'я Бульба
- Born: September 25, 1995; Odesa, Ukraine
- Disappeared: August 6, 2016; Shanghai, China
- Status: Missing for 10 years, 1 month and 20 days
- Occupation: Model

Darya Bulba (Ukrainian: Дар'я Бульба; born September 25, 1995) was a Ukrainian model who disappeared on August 6, 2016, in Shanghai, China. Local authorities have proposed several different hypotheses, including suicide and kidnapping, but have not reached a definitive conclusion. Her whereabouts remain unknown.

== Background ==
Bulba was born in 1995 in Odesa, Ukraine. She studied law at the Odesa College of Hotel Management, where she also took modeling courses, vocal lessons, and learned to play guitar. She also attended a local modeling school.

In 2013, Bulba began working as a professional model. A few years later, she began travelling throughout Europe, including Italy, Greece, and Turkey. On April 7, 2016, she travelled to China to work under contract with the Shanghai-based BYS Model Agency.

== Disappearance ==
On August 5, 2016, Bulba spoke with her mother by telephone, and said that she might not be able to stay in frequent contact due to the cost of roaming charges. As a result, her family did not initially become concerned when they were unable to reach her, only beginning to question her absence around August 7.

According to Bulba's family, her roommates said that she left the previous night to meet an unknown man and had not returned. The last known footage of Bulba was recorded on surveillance cameras between 5 and 6 AM on August 6, 2016. The footage showed her listening to music and dancing near the Oriental Pearl Tower before she walked out of view and disappeared.

Chinese police examined Bulba's phone and found that she had been receiving regular calls from unidentified numbers. Her friends reported that a stranger had repeatedly scheduled meetings with her at the hotel but never arrived.

== Investigation ==
Bulba's relatives appealed to Interpol, local authorities, and the media for assistance. Her father contacted television channels across Ukraine seeking help in locating his daughter, but received no response. Chinese police suggested that Bulba might have been under the influence of alcohol or other substances and accidentally drowned in the nearby water. However, search-and-rescue divers were unable to recover a body.

As of September 2026, Bulba's disappearance remained unsolved.

== Influence ==
Bulba's case has been covered by journalists and online true crime influencers, who have proposed various theories including accidental drowning, kidnapping by criminal gangs, and human trafficking, although none have been substantiated.

Ukrainian media have also reported on the case. One newspaper attempted to link Bulba's disappearance to the arrest of Hou Jianwen, a Chinese aerospace specialist who was accused of espionage. The newspaper alleged that Hou recruited young women as part of a honey trap operation, although there was no evidence to support this theory.
