= List of Disappeared episodes =

This is a list of episodes of Disappeared, a television program broadcast on the Investigation Discovery network that documents missing persons cases. The program was first aired in December 2009, with subsequent seasons shown through 2013, and, after a three-year hiatus, resumed in 2016 through 2018. The show, again, returned in 2022 following a four-year absence.

== Series overview ==
Season	Episodes (Note: All episode titles and subjects have been adapted from TV Guide's official episode guide.)	Season premiere	Season finale
1	13	December 10, 2009	April 5, 2010
2	13	October 4, 2010	December 27, 2010
3	13	January 3, 2011	March 28, 2011
4	14	April 4, 2011	January 2, 2012
5	17	January 9, 2012	April 30, 2012
6	15	November 19, 2012	April 4, 2013
Specials	4	May 26, 2014	April 12, 2015
7	10	April 11, 2016	June 6, 2016
8	13	March 26, 2017	June 26, 2017
9	13	March 16, 2018	June 24, 2018
10	8	September 7, 2022	November 2, 2022
11	10	August 20, 2023	October 29, 2023

== Episodes ==
- Note: Episode subjects who are still actively missing are linked to their profiles at The Charley Project, a missing persons database. For persons subsequently found alive or deceased, names of subjects are linked to reliable news sources regarding their disappearance and discovery.

=== Season 1 (2009–2010) ===
No. overall	No. in season	Title	Person (People) missing	Date and location	Outcome	Original release date
1	1	"The End of Innocence"	Brandi Ellen Wells	August 3, 2006, in Longview, Texas	Still missing	December 10, 2009
2	2	"A Mother's Secret"	Paige Birgfeld	June 28, 2007, in Mesa County, Colorado	Found deceased after broadcast in 2012. Remains were found by a hiker in Delta County, near the Mesa County line. Lester Jones was arrested in 2014 and was convicted on December 27, 2016 of kidnapping and murdering her. He was sentenced to life in prison.	January 11, 2010
3	3	"A Fateful Meeting"	Amy St. Laurent	October 20, 2001, in Portland, Maine	Found deceased in December 2001, buried in the woods off Route 22 in Scarborough, Maine. Jeffrey "Russ" Gorman was convicted of first degree murder in Amy St. Laurent's death and sentenced to sixty years in prison.	January 18, 2010
4	4	"The Last Truck Stop"	Michele Whitaker	August 16, 2002, in Spartanburg, South Carolina	Found alive in 2008. Michele told family members she disappeared because she wanted to start a new life.	January 25, 2010
5	5	"A Lost Soul"	Lee Sterling Cutler	October 20, 2007, in Buffalo Grove, Illinois	Still missing	February 1, 2010
6	6	"Miles to Nowhere"	Maura Murray	February 9, 2004, near Haverhill, New Hampshire	Still missing	February 8, 2010
7	7	"Favorite Son"	William Paul "Billy" Smolinski Jr	August 24, 2004, in Waterbury, Connecticut	Still missing	February 15, 2010
8	8	"The Long Drive Home"	Michelle McMullen	September 28, 2008, in Harrisburg, Pennsylvania	Found alive in 2011. She pleaded guilty to forgery and theft charges and was sentenced to five years of probation and ordered to pay $6,000 in restitution.	February 22, 2010
9	9	"The Most Hated Woman in America"	Madalyn Murray O'Hair, Jon Murray, and Robin Murray O'Hair	August 27, 1995, in Austin, Texas	Found deceased in 2001, buried on a remote Texas ranch, 120 miles from San Antonio. Gary Paul Karr was found guilty of extortion and other charges relating to the O'Hair cases and was sentenced to life in prison. David Rolland Waters was found guilty of kidnapping, robbery, and first degree murder, and was sentenced to 80 years in prison; he died in prison on January 27, 2003.	March 1, 2010
10	10	"Rosemary's Secret"	Rosemary Anne Christensen	August 26, 1999, in Tampa, Florida	Found deceased in 2008, buried in sand beside the Suwannee River. Her husband, Robert Glenn Temple, was convicted of her murder in 2011, and died in prison in 2018.	March 8, 2010
11	11	"When the Music Stopped"	John Michael Spira	February 23, 2007, in Chicago, Illinois	Still missing	March 15, 2010
12	12	"Dark Waters"	Bison Dele né Brian Carson Williams, Serena Karlan, and Bertrand Saldo	July 7, 2002, near Tahiti	Still missing. Bison Dele is presumed dead.	March 22, 2010
13	13	"Royal Secrets"	Royal "Scoop" Daniel III	April 27, 2007, in Breckenridge, Colorado	Found alive after broadcast, trying to enter US from Mexico in 2011. He pleaded guilty to two counts of theft and was sentenced in 2012 to twelve years in prison and was ordered to pay $460,000 in restitution.	March 29, 2010

=== Season 2 (2010) ===
No. overall	No. in season	Title	Person(s) missing	Date and location	Outcome	Original release date
14	1	"The Secret Journey"	Brittanee Drexel	April 25, 2009, in Myrtle Beach, South Carolina	Found deceased after broadcast. On May 11, 2022, Drexel's remains were found. Raymond Moody has been charged with murder, kidnapping and first-degree criminal sexual conduct. In late 2022 he pleaded guilty to murder, criminal sexual assault and several other offenses in her case.	October 4, 2010
15	2	"The Beauty Queen Mystery"	Tara Grinstead	October 22, 2005, in Ocilla, Georgia	Still missing, but possibly cremated. Ryan Alexander Duke, a former student at Irwin County High School, was charged with her murder in 2016; in April 2017, a grand jury indicted Duke in Tara’s murder. Bo Dukes (not related to Duke) was indicted for helping dispose of her remains, allegedly by burning. On March 26, 2019 Dukes was found guilty of all four counts he was facing in connection with Grinstead’s death. He was sentenced to 25 years in prison. The trial for Ryan Duke, the man charged with killing Grinstead, was scheduled to start on April 1, 2019. Bo and Ryan confessed to cremating Tara's body to ashes. Despite pieces of a human skull and other bones being found on the pecan orchard indicated by them, no DNA was recovered due to the extensive damage by the fire.	October 11, 2010
16	3	"Vanishing Bride"	Marilyn Renee "Niqui" McCown	July 22, 2001, in Richmond, Indiana	Still missing	October 18, 2010
17	4	"No Exit"	Tanya Rider	September 19, 2007, near Seattle, Washington	Found alive September 28, 2007, twenty feet down a roadside ravine, still strapped into the front seat of her car, which ran off the road near the Seattle suburb of Renton.	October 25, 2010
18	5	"Lost Trust"	Elizabeth and John Calvert	March 3, 2008, in Hilton Head Island, South Carolina	Still missing. Both were declared legally dead in 2009.	November 1, 2010
19	6	"Lost Highway"	Michael "Bradyn" Fuksa	July 16, 2009, in Olathe, Kansas	After broadcast, found deceased in Casper, Wyoming, May 2015. Found to have died of a self-inflicted gunshot wound.	November 8, 2010
20	7	"Danger at Dusk"	Kristi Cornwell	August 11, 2009, in Union County, Georgia	Found deceased in 2011 after broadcast. Her burned, skeletal remains were found in the north Georgia woods.	November 15, 2010
21	8	"Mojave Mystery"	April Beth Pitzer	June 28, 2004, in Newberry Springs, California	Still missing	November 22, 2010
22	9	"Unfinished Business"	John Glasgow	January 28, 2008, in Little Rock, Arkansas	Found deceased after broadcast. His remains were found by hikers in a rugged area of Petit Jean Mountain in March 2015.	November 29, 2010
23	10	"Paradise Lost"	Bobby, Sherilyn, and Madyson Jamison	October 8, 2009, near Red Oak, Oklahoma	Found deceased in 2013 after broadcast, by hunters three miles from where the Jamisons’ pickup truck and dog were found in 2010. No cause of death was determined, and the circumstances surrounding their disappearance remain unknown.	December 6, 2010
24	11	"Final Prayer"	Timothy "Tim" Carney	September 28, 2004, in Butler, New Jersey	Found alive in 2012 after broadcast. Mr. Carney was found alive and well but did not wish to disclose his whereabouts.	December 13, 2010
25	12	"Doomed Romance"	Jeramy Carl Burt	February 11, 2007, in Boise, Idaho	Still missing	December 20, 2010
26	13	"Gone at 17"	Kara Elise Kopetsky	May 4, 2007, in Belton, Missouri	Found deceased after broadcast in 2017. Her remains were found in a wooded area south of Belton, Cass County. Kylr Yust, Kopetsky's ex-boyfriend and in jail for unrelated drug trafficking charges, admitted to strangling both Kara Kopetsky & Jessica Runions. Yust was sentenced to 15 years in prison for the voluntary manslaughter of Kopetsky and life in prison (30 years) for the second-degree murder of Runions in June 2021. At trial, Yust testified that his half-brother, Jessep Carter, was involved in the murders. Carter committed suicide in jail in September 2018.	December 27, 2010

=== Season 3 (2011) ===
No. overall	No. in season	Title	Person(s) missing	Date and location	Outcome	Original release date
27	1	"Mystery at the Border"	Joseph, Summer, Gianni, and Joseph McStay Jr.	February 4, 2010, in Fallbrook, California	Found deceased after broadcast in the desert near Victorville, California, November 13, 2013. Charles "Chase" Merritt, a business associate of the patriarch Joseph McStay, was found guilty of all four murders and sentenced to death on January 21, 2020.	January 3, 2011
28	2	"Secret Rendezvous"	Patricia "Patti" Adkins	June 29, 2001, in Marysville, Ohio	Still missing. Declared legally deceased in 2006.	January 10, 2011
29	3	"Murky Waters"	Molly Bish	June 27, 2000, in Warren, Massachusetts	Found deceased June 9, 2003, five miles from her family home.	January 17, 2011
30	4	"The Final Chord"	Brian Barton	March 10, 2005, in Federal Way, Washington	Found deceased in August 2017 behind a church, within a mile of where Barton had been living.	January 24, 2011
31	5	"Gone on the Fourth of July"	Roxanne Paltauf	July 7, 2006, in Austin, Texas	Still missing	January 31, 2011
32	6	"Into the Woods"	Jeremy Alex	April 24, 2004, in Northport, Maine	Still missing	February 7, 2011
33	7	"The Darkest Night"	Toni Lee Sharpless	August 23, 2009, in West Brandywine Township, Pennsylvania	Still missing	February 14, 2011
34	8	"Soul Searcher"	Leah Roberts	March 9, 2000, near Bellingham, Washington	Still missing	February 21, 2011
35	9	"A Family's Curse"	Ray Gricar	April 15, 2005, in State College, Pennsylvania	Still missing. Declared legally deceased after broadcast.	February 28, 2011
36	10	"The Springfield Three"	Sherrill Levitt, Suzanne Streeter, and Stacy McCall	June 7, 1992, in Springfield, Missouri	Still missing. Sherrill Levitt and Suzanne Streeter were declared legally dead in 1997.	March 7, 2011
37	11	"A Mother's Mission"	Samantha Bonnell	September 24, 2005, near Montclair, California	Found deceased 2005, struck by several cars as she ran across Interstate 10. Samantha had no identification on her and she lay unclaimed at the San Bernardino County Coroner's Office. Her body was finally identified in April 2007.	March 14, 2011
38	12	"Lost Hero"	Brandy Hall	August 17, 2006, in Malabar, Florida	Still missing. Declared legally dead in August 2015.	March 21, 2011
39	13	"Silent Night"	Patty Vaughan	December 25, 1996, in La Vernia, Texas	Still missing	March 28, 2011

=== Season 4 (2011–2012) ===
No. overall	No. in season	Title	Person(s) missing	Date and location	Outcome	Original release date
40	1	"Running for Her Life"	Rachel Cooke	January 10, 2002, in Georgetown, Texas	Still missing	April 4, 2011
41	2	"Secrets of a Son"	Steven Koecher	December 13, 2009, in Henderson, Nevada	Still missing	April 11, 2011
42	3	"Heavy Metal Mystery"	Morgan Harrington	October 17, 2009, near Charlottesville, Virginia	Found deceased in 2009, her remains were discovered three months later in rural farmland. Jesse Matthew Jr. was formally charged with her murder on September 15, 2015. On March 2, 2016, he pleaded guilty to first degree murder and abduction with intent of Morgan Harrington as well as Hannah Graham in 2014, and was sentenced to four consecutive life sentences without the chance of release or parole.	April 18, 2011
43	4	"Game Over"	Charlie Allen, Jr.	October 12, 2007, in Dartmouth, Massachusetts	Still missing	April 25, 2011
44	5	"Missing Valentine"	Patricia Viola	February 13, 2001, in Bogota, New Jersey	Found deceased after broadcast. Her remains were recovered in 2002 on Rockaway Beach, but not identified until 2012.	October 24, 2011
45	6	"The Dark Ravine"	Alicia Amanda "Mandy" Stokes	November 25, 2007, in Oakland, California	Still missing	October 31, 2011
46	7	"A Father's Quest"	Leah Rachelle Peebles	May 22, 2006, in Albuquerque, New Mexico	Still missing	November 7, 2011
47	8	"Memory Lane"	Amber Gerweck	April 9, 2011, in Joliet, Illinois	Found alive three weeks later. She had experienced dissociative fugue, a rare malady accompanied by amnesia.	November 14, 2011
48	9	"Spring Break Nightmare"	Colleen Orsborn	March 15, 1984, in Daytona Beach, Florida	Found deceased three weeks after disappearance, buried in a shallow grave near a lake in Orange County, Florida. Colleen was unidentified until DNA tests in 2011.	November 21, 2011
49	10	"Mystery on Lake Seminole"	Jerry Michael Williams	December 16, 2000, in Tallahassee, Florida	After broadcast, found deceased in October 2017. Denise Merrell Williams convicted in December 2018 of first-degree murder, conspiracy to commit first-degree murder and accessory after the fact; in February 2019, she was sentenced to life in prison without the possibility of parole, and an additional 30 years for helping plot the murder, which was committed by her ex-lover and co-conspirator Brian Winchester.	November 28, 2011
50	11	"Vanished In Vermont"	Brianna Maitland	March 19, 2004, in Montgomery, Vermont	Still missing	December 5, 2011
51	12	"Midnight Walk"	Lucely Aramburo	June 1, 2007, in Dania Beach, Florida	Still missing	December 12, 2011
52	13	"The Wedding Ring"	Tina Marie McQuaig	March 15, 2000, in Jacksonville, Florida	Found deceased in 2002 in a remote, wooded area of Cecil Commerce Center. Her remains indicated a violent death.	December 19, 2011
53	14	"Innocence Lost"	Jamie Fraley	April 8, 2008, in Gastonia, North Carolina	Still missing	January 2, 2012

=== Season 5 (2012) ===
No. overall	No. in season	Title	Person(s) missing	Date and location	Outcome	Original release date
54	1	"The Road Not Taken"	Virginia "Ginni" Wood, Kelly Gaskins, and Ervin Williams	March 10, 2007, in Chocowinity, North Carolina	Still missing	January 9, 2012
55	2	"Dancing into Darkness"	Susan Walsh	July 16, 1996, in Nutley, New Jersey	Still missing	January 16, 2012
56	3	"Crime and Punishment"	Terrance Williams	January 12, 2004, in Naples, Florida	Still missing	January 23, 2012
57	4	"Wrong Side of the Tracks"	Jackie Markham	December 14, 2000, in Callahan, Florida	Still missing	January 30, 2012
58	5	"Daddy's Girl"	Danice Day	January 9, 2002, in Monte Vista, Colorado	Found deceased in 2009. Victor Braun, convicted of her death, had dumped an oil barrel containing Danice’s charred, fragmented remains in Lyman Lake in the Arizona mountains some 400 miles away from the San Luis Valley.	February 6, 2012
59	6	"Last Call"	Allison Jackson Foy	July 30, 2006, near Wilmington, North Carolina	Found deceased in 2008. Her remains were discovered in a wooded area about three miles away.	February 13, 2012
60	7	"Hometown Hero"	Margaret Haddican McEnroe	October 12, 2006, in Warren Township, New Jersey	Still missing	February 20, 2012
61	8	"A Soldier's Story"	Noah Pippin	September 15, 2010, in Helena, Montana	After broadcast, found deceased in 2012 in a boulder crevice at 7,500 feet, in a remote area, about 18 miles into the wilderness Bob Marshall Wilderness Area south of Glacier National Park.	February 27, 2012
62	9	"Into the Bayou"	Clinton Nelson	September 1, 2006, in Princeton, Louisiana	Still missing	March 5, 2012
63	10	"Little Girl Lost"	Joey Lynn Offutt	July 12, 2007, in Sykesville, Pennsylvania	Still missing. Declared legally dead in 2016.	March 12, 2012
64	11	"The Vortex"	Ben McDaniel	August 18, 2010, near Ponce de Leon, Florida	Still missing	March 19, 2012
65	12	"Final Exam"	Suzanne "Suzy" Lyall	March 2, 1998, in Albany, New York	Still missing	March 26, 2012
66	13	"Too Young For Love"	Chioma Gray	December 13, 2007, in Ventura, California	Found alive in 2011 in Mexico. 15-year-old Chioma ran away with her 20-year-old boyfriend, Andrew Joshua Tafoya. He pleaded guilty to concealing a child and was sentenced to two years in prison.	April 2, 2012
67	14	"Footprints in the Sand"	Shannan Gilbert	May 1, 2010, in Jersey City, New Jersey	Found deceased in 2011. Gilbert's remains were discovered in a marshy area in Oak Beach, Long Island.	April 9, 2012
68	15	"Just a Nice Guy"	Zebb Quinn	January 2, 2000, in Asheville, North Carolina	Still missing, but presumed dead. After broadcast, Robert Jason Owens, the last person to see Zebb alive, had been indicted in the homicide of Zebb Quinn. Owens has already pled guilty to the murders of Food Network Star television contestant Cristie Schoen, her husband J.T. Codd, and their unborn child.	April 16, 2012
69	16	"Hard Life in the Big Easy"	Dana "Polly" Pastori	February 27, 2002, near New Orleans, Louisiana	Found deceased in 2005. Her mummified remains were found in a trunk in a New Orleans apartment. Her boyfriend, John Morgan, was convicted of her murder in July 2009 and sentenced to life in prison with no possibility of parole.	April 23, 2012
70	17	"Missing By Design"	William "Billy" McGrath	August 17, 2009, in Phoenix, Arizona	Found deceased in 2011, buried under the house of Bradley Tocker. He was convicted of first-degree murder in the death of McGrath, fraud, and theft, and sentenced to life in prison with no possibility of parole.	April 30, 2012

=== Season 6 (2012–2013) ===
No. overall	No. in season	Title	Person(s) missing	Date and location	Outcome	Original release date
71	1	"Lost in the Dark"	Mitrice Richardson	September 17, 2009, in Malibu, California	Found deceased in 2010 in a deep ravine in Malibu Canyon by park rangers, her remains were naked and mummified.	November 19, 2012
72	2	"The Soldier's Wife"	Bethany Decker	January 29, 2011, near Ashburn, Virginia	Still missing, but confirmed to be dead; in 2022 her boyfriend at the time, Ronald Roldan, pleaded guilty to second-degree murder. As part of a plea deal with prosecutors, Roldan agreed to go on the record with his account of the murder. He claims they got into an argument in their Ashburn apartment, and he pushed her. She fell and hit her head on a windowsill. He says he put her body into a Christmas tree disposal bag and dumped her in the trash compactor at their complex.	November 26, 2012
73	3	"The Dutchman's Curse"	Jesse Capen	December 4, 2009, in Denver, Colorado	Found deceased after broadcast in 2013. His remains were found beneath a sheer cliff in the Superstition Mountains near Phoenix, Arizona, wedged in an inaccessible crevasse.	December 3, 2012
74	4	"Dark Voyage"	Colleen Wood	December 28, 2000, in Fort Lauderdale, Florida	Still missing	December 10, 2012
75	5	"One-Way Ticket"	Hatice Corbacioglu	June 13, 2009, in Toronto, Ontario	Still missing	December 17, 2012
76	6	"City of Angels"	Satara Stratton	October 17, 2011, in Los Angeles, California	Found alive before air date. Died on February 4, 2017.	December 24, 2012
77	7	"Missing in the Mountains"	Amy Wroe Bechtel	July 24, 1997, in Lander, Wyoming	Still missing. Declared legally dead in 2004.	January 7, 2013
78	8	"Radio Silence"	Randy Morgenson	July 23, 1996, near Fresno, California	Found deceased July 2001, likely fell through a snow drift and broke his leg while crossing a creek, dying of associated injuries and hypothermia. His remains were washed down the creek and into a small cascade where they were hidden in the rocks for years.	January 14, 2013
79	9	"Out of the Ashes"	Lauria Bible and Ashley Freeman	December 30, 1999, in Welch, Oklahoma	Still missing. In April 2018, three men: Warren “Phil” Welch and David Pennington (both deceased), and Ronnie Busick, were implicated in the murders of Bible and Freeman. Police uncovered Polaroid photos of the girls bound and gagged which had been kept by Welch, Pennington, and Busick as "trophies." Busick was arrested on April 22, 2018 and released in May 2023.	January 21, 2013
80	10	"Breaking News"	Jodi Huisentruit	June 27, 1995, in Mason City, Iowa	Still missing. Declared legally dead in May 2001.	January 28, 2013
81	11	"A Diamond Is Forever"	Bob Wykel	February 21, 1996, in Burien, Washington	Still missing, but declared legally deceased. Myron C. Wynn was convicted of first-degree murder in the death of Wykel and was sentenced to twenty years in prison.	February 4, 2013
82	12	"Final Season"	Tracy Ocasio	May 27, 2009, in Orlando, Florida	Still missing	March 31, 2013
83	13	"Long Lost Love"	Robert 'Bob' Harrod	July 27, 2009, in Placentia, California	Still missing	April 4, 2013
84	14	"Birds of Prey"	Moses Lall and Lila Buerattan	June 15, 1994, in Loxahatchee, Florida	Still missing	April 4, 2013
85	15	"At the Crossroads"	Jarrod Johnston	July 7, 2007, near Yazoo City, Mississippi	Still missing	April 4, 2013

=== Specials (2014–2015) ===
No. overall	No. in season	Title	Person(s) missing	Date and location	Outcome	Original release date
86	1	"Missing in Maui: A Disappeared Special"	Carly 'Charli' Scott Archived 2017-03-25 at the Wayback Machine(subscription required)	February 9, 2014, in Maui, Hawaii	Found deceased. Scott’s bloodstained knifetorn clothing and body parts were found in a brush area at Nuaailua Bay near Keanae. Steven Capobianco, Scott's ex-boyfriend, was convicted of second-degree murder in her death and in March 2017 was sentenced to life in prison.	May 26, 2014
87	2	"Lauryn is Lost: A Disappeared Special"	Lauryn Garrett	May 1, 2014, in Sequim, Washington	Found alive. In June 2014, Lauryn was seen at a grocery store in Shoreline, Washington by a cashier who was a childhood friend. Lauryn's father confirmed that it was his daughter. A notice later added at the end of the Disappeared program states that Lauryn "returned home on 18 October 2014".	August 31, 2014
88	3	"Lone Star Mystery: A Disappeared Special"	Christina Morris	August 30, 2014, in Plano, Texas	Found deceased after broadcast. Remains found on March 7, 2018. While Morris was still a missing person, Enrique Arochi was sentenced to life in prison for kidnapping her.	January 7, 2015
89	4	"Gone in Georgia: A Disappeared Special"	Kelly Nash	January 5, 2015, in Buford, Georgia	Found deceased in February 2015 in a Lake Lanier cove, drowned with a gunshot wound.	April 12, 2015

=== Season 7 (2016) ===
No. overall	No. in season	Title	Person(s) missing	Date and location	Outcome	Original release date
90	1	"Somebody's Watching"	Jessica Heeringa	April 26, 2013, near Norton Shores, Michigan	Still missing, but presumed dead. On May 16, 2018, Jeffrey Willis was found guilty of Heeringa's kidnapping and murder and received a life sentence without parole. On November 2, 2017, Willis had been convicted of the 2014 murder of Rebekah Bletsch, receiving a life sentence without parole. On November 27, 2017, Willis' cousin Kevin Bluhm had pleaded no contest to being an accessory after the fact for helping Willis dispose of Heeringa's body and was sentenced to five years probation.	April 11, 2016
91	2	"Against the Tide"	Tiffany Daniels	August 12, 2013, in Fort Pickens, Florida	Still missing	April 18, 2016
92	3	"Road to Nowhere"	Bryce Laspisa	August 30, 2013, near Castaic, California	Still missing	April 25, 2016
93	4	"Walk Into Darkness"	Tammy Kingery	September 20, 2014, near North Augusta, South Carolina	Still missing	May 2, 2016
94	5	"Off the Grid"	Brian Histand	May 15, 2013, in Maricopa County, Arizona	Found deceased from presumed natural causes in January 2016, prior to broadcast. His remains were found in several locations in the southern portion of the South Mountain park, Arizona.	May 9, 2016
95	6	"No Stone Unturned"	David Riemens	August 8, 2012, near Wilson County, Tennessee	Found deceased after broadcast in January 2018. Remains found off Taylor Road, near Sparta Pike near Watertown, in Wilson County Tennessee.	May 16, 2016
96	7	"California Leaving"	Rico Harris	October 10, 2014, near Sacramento, California	Still missing	May 23, 2016
97	8	"A Family Man"	Robert Hoagland	July 28, 2013, near Fairfield County, Connecticut	Found deceased after broadcast in December 2022. He had been living under an alias for nine years, in Rock Hill, New York.	May 30, 2016
98	9	"Love Triangle"	Brandy Hanna	May 20, 2005, near Charleston, South Carolina	Still missing. On December 12, 2016, Garland Eugene Lankford, former boyfriend of Hanna, was charged by North Charleston Police with obstruction of justice in connection with the 2005 disappearance of Brandy Hanna.	June 6, 2016
99	10	"Girl Interrupted"	Jennifer Kesse	January 24, 2006, in Ocoee, Florida	Still missing	June 6, 2016

=== Season 8 (2017) ===
No. overall	No. in season	Title	Person(s) missing	Date and location	Outcome	Original release date
100	1	"American Gothic"	Lynn Messer	July 8, 2014, in St. Genevieve, Missouri	Found deceased on November 2, 2016. Her remains were found on the edge of the farm where she had lived.	March 26, 2017
101	2	"The Silent Son"	Macin Smith	September 1, 2015, in Saint George, Utah	Still missing	April 2, 2017
102	3	"Spirited Away"	Kortne Stouffer	July 28, 2012, in Palmyra, Pennsylvania	Still missing	April 9, 2017
103	4	"On a Mission"	Elizabeth Salgado	April 16, 2015, in Provo, Utah	After broadcast, found deceased on May 18th, 2018. Her remains were located in a canyon near Springville, Utah some 10 miles southeast of Provo. Police say her death was a homicide.	April 16, 2017
104	5	"Every Mother's Son"	Elijah "Bear" Diaz	August 29, 2015, in El Cajon, California	Still missing	April 23, 2017
105	6	"Into The Night"	Zoe Campos	November 18, 2013, in Lubbock, Texas	Found deceased on November 16, 2018, buried in the former back-yard of Carlos Andrew Rodriguez. Carlos Andrew Rodriguez charged with murder on November 17, 2018, and in July 2019 he confessed to the murder.	April 30, 2017
106	7	"Flight Risk"	Katelin Akens	December 5, 2015, near Spotsylvania, Virginia	Still missing	May 7, 2017
107	8	"About a Boy"	Zachary Bernhardt	September 11, 2000, in Clearwater, Florida	Still missing	May 21, 2017
108	9	"The One That Got Away"	Eric Lee Franks	March 21, 2011, in Saginaw, Michigan	Still missing. Franks' car was recovered in September 2020. It had been hidden in the garage of Gerald Rutledge, an elderly and incapacitated Saginaw man, for whom Franks' former girlfriend (Kendra, deceased September 2016) was a caregiver at the time of Franks' disappearance. There was a spot of blood on the driver's seat, and DNA testing showed it was Franks' blood.	May 28, 2017
109	10	"The Last Summer"	Kayla Berg	August 11, 2009, in Wausau, Wisconsin	Still missing	June 4, 2017
110	11	"A Bridge Too Far"	Richard Petrone and Danielle Imbo	February 19, 2005, in Philadelphia, Pennsylvania	Still missing. Being investigated by the FBI as a potential murder-for-hire.	June 11, 2017
111	12	"Lost Angel"	Angel Garcia	October 21, 2011, in Hartford, Connecticut	Still missing	June 18, 2017
112	13	"The Long Way Home"	Deanne Hastings	November 3, 2015, in Spokane, Washington	Still missing	June 25, 2017

=== Season 9 (2018) ===
No. overall	No. in season	Title	Person(s) missing	Date and location	Outcome	Original release date
113	Early–premiere	"A Date With Danger"	Nancy Moyer	March 6, 2009, in Tenino, Washington	Still missing	March 16, 2018
114	1	"Edge of Fourteen"	Ashley Summers	July 9, 2007, in Cleveland, Ohio	Still missing	April 1, 2018
115	2	"Last Words"	Logan Schiendelman	May 19, 2016, in Tumwater, Washington	Still missing	April 8, 2018
116	3	"Troubled Waters"	Amy Bradley	March 24, 1998, near Curaçao, Dutch Caribbean, Netherlands	Still missing. Declared dead in absentia March 24, 2010.	April 15, 2018
117	4	"Into the Mist"	Stephanie Crane	October 11, 1993, in Challis, Idaho	Still missing	April 22, 2018
118	5	"Born This Way"	Dashad Laquinn "Sage" Smith	November 20, 2012, in Charlottesville, Virginia	Still missing	April 29, 2018
119	6	"The Vanishing Hour"	Tyarra Williams	January 7, 2016, in Greensboro, North Carolina	Still missing	May 6, 2018
120	7	"In Broad Daylight"	Holly Cantrell	January 20, 2017, in McAlester, Oklahoma	Found deceased after broadcast. Her remains were found by volunteers near the Cardinal Pointe area of Lake Eufaula, Pittsburg County, Oklahoma in March 2018, but went unidentified until February 2020. Her purse was found earlier in February 2017, about a mile from the remains. Cody Ketchum was found guilty of the First-Degree murder of Holly Cantrell and of destroying evidence on March 14, 2024.	May 13, 2018
121	8	"Just Out of Sight"	Michael Vanzandt	March 5, 2016, in Hermosa Beach, California	Still missing	May 21, 2018
122	9	"So Close to Home"	Alexandria "Ali" Lowitzer	April 26, 2010, in Spring, Texas	Still missing	May 27, 2018
123	10	"Last Stop"	Tabitha Tuders	April 29, 2003, in Nashville, Tennessee	Still missing	June 3, 2018
124	11	"Breaking Away"	James "Martin" Roberts	April 21, 2016, in Boone, North Carolina	Still missing	June 10, 2018
125	12	"Moment of Truth"	Michael Chambers	March 10, 2017, in Quinlan, Texas	Found deceased after broadcast. His remains were found about 15km away in Rains County, in a wooded area off U.S. Highway 276 and east of East Tawakoni in November 2022, but went unidentified until May 2023.	June 17, 2018

=== Season 10 (2022) ===
No. overall	No. in season	Title	Person(s) missing	Date and location	Outcome	Original release date
126	1	"Vanished in the Night"	Kirsten Brueggeman	January 2, 2021, in Indianapolis	Still missing	September 7, 2022
127	2	"Disappearance in the Desert"	Daniel Robinson	June 23, 2021, in Buckeye, Arizona	Still missing	September 14, 2022
128	3	"Navajo Nightmare"	Pepita Redhair	March 27, 2020 in Albuquerque, New Mexico	Still missing	September 21, 2022
129	4	"The Long Drive Home"	Jason Landry	December 13, 2020, in San Marcos, Texas	Found deceased after broadcast. Landry’s remains were found near Soda Springs Road on September 8, 2026, and were confirmed as his via DNA later that month. There has been no indication of foul play.	September 28, 2022
130	5	"Vanished in the Heartland"	Dee Ann Warner	April 25, 2021, in Tipton, Michigan	Found deceased after broadcast. Warner's remains were found on August 17, 2024, in a resealed anhydrous tank on her husband Dale Warner's Paragon Road property. He was convicted of second degree murder on March 10, 2026.	October 5, 2022
131	6	"Vanishing on the Border"	Ramiro Avila Jr aka Kimberly Avila	May 13, 2017, in Brownsville, Texas	Still missing	October 19, 2022
132	7	"The Sweetest Man in the World"	Brian Edward Klecha	December 27, 2017, in Lakeland, Florida	Still missing	October 26, 2022
133	8	"New Mom Missing"	Ciera Breland	February 24, 2022, in Johns Creek, Georgia	Still missing	November 2, 2022

=== Season 11 (2023) ===
No. overall	No. in season	Title	Person(s) missing	Date and location	Outcome	Original release date
134	"Premiere Special"	"The Bradley Sisters"	Diamond & Tionda Bradley	July 6, 2001 in Chicago, Illinois	Still missing	August 20, 2023
135	1	"A Vanishing at the Golden Gate Bridge"	Sydney West	September 29, 2020, in San Francisco, California	Still missing	August 27, 2023
136	2	"Love and Lies in Idyllwild"	Lydia “Dia” Abrams	June 6, 2020, in Mountain Center, California	Still missing	September 3, 2023
137	3	"Mountain of Mystery"	Dahvonte Morgan	May 5, 2020, in Mount Shasta, California	Still missing	September 10, 2023
138	4	"The Secrets of Bissonnett Street"	Kristen Galvan	January 2, 2020, in Spring, Texas	Found deceased prior to broadcast. On January 29, 2020, her partial skeletal remains were found under a bridge in Missouri City, Texas. They were not identified until January 2026.	September 17, 2023
139	5	"Lost in Her Secret"	Sheena Gibbs	November 8, 2021, in Chicago, Illinois	Still missing	September 25, 2023
140	6	"Lost in Paradise"	Alex Gumm	February 23, 2018, in Kauaʻi, Hawaii	Still missing	October 1, 2023
141	7	"Descent Into Darkness"	Nathaniel Holmes	December 19, 2017, in Westminster, Colorado	Still missing	October 8, 2023
142	8	"Gone With the Night"	Gretchen Fleming	Dec. 4, 2022, in Parkersburg, West Virginia	Found deceased after broadcast. In September 2025, Fleming’s skull was found over an embankment in the Palestine area of Wirt County, West Virginia. It was identified in May 2026. Preston Pierce has been charged with her murder. His extradition hearing is set for June 5, 2026.	October 15, 2023
143	9	"Trouble at Home"	Tracie Bell	March 6, 2018, in Richton Park, Illinois	Still missing	October 22, 2023
144	10	"Mystery in the Ozarks"	Christopher Hoye	May 19, 2022, in Dixon, Missouri	Still missing	October 29, 2023

== See also ==
- List of people who disappeared mysteriously
