= Disappearance of Jamie Fraley =

North Carolina disappearance case

Coordinates: 35.2433°N 81.0978°W

Jamie Michelle Fraley
- Born: March 5, 1986; Gaston County, North Carolina, U.S.
- Disappeared: April 8, 2008 (aged 22); Gastonia, North Carolina, U.S.
- Status: Missing for 18 years, 6 months and 6 days
- Known for: Disappearance
- Height: 4 ft 9 in (145 cm)

In the early hours of April 8, 2008, Jamie Fraley, a 22‑year‑old woman from Gastonia, North Carolina, told a friend by phone that she was going to the hospital for the third time in 24 hours due to a stomach flu. When asked who was taking her, she said it was another friend but declined to identify the person. She has not been seen since. Her cellphone was found a few days later, but it provided no useful information about her whereabouts.

Investigators initially suspected foul play and focused on Ricky Simonds Sr., her fiancé's father, as a person of interest. He lived in the same apartment complex, had driven Fraley to the hospital earlier that day, and had a criminal record that included a manslaughter conviction for strangling a girlfriend in the 1980s. The inquiry into him ended two months later when Simonds was found dead, apparently from heat stroke, in the trunk of a former girlfriend's car.

In 2015, a prison inmate confessed to killing Fraley, but he was incarcerated at the time she disappeared. The investigation remains open. In 2012, the case was featured in an episode of the Investigation Discovery series Disappeared.

== Background ==
Jamie Fraley was born on March 5, 1986, a native of Gaston County, she had struggled with anxiety and bipolar disorder throughout her early life. By the late 2000s, Fraley had responded well to prescription medications for those conditions and was attending Gaston College on a part-time basis. According to her family, she was planning on a career as a substance-abuse counselor.

In 2006 she had begun dating Ricky Simonds Jr. Her family said she was very much in love with him, and eventually the two became engaged. However, Simonds had a criminal history, and after several earlier arrests for petty crimes, in early 2007 he was sentenced to 15 months in state prison for theft. Fraley continued to visit and interact with him while he was incarcerated.

== Disappearance ==
On April 7, 2008, Fraley came down with a stomach virus. It was severe enough that she twice sought treatment at a local hospital that day. As she had no driver's license, she relied on a social services worker, and friends and family to take her to and from the hospital.

After returning from the first trip, one of Fraley's friends visited her and picked up her dog, which Fraley had been sitting for her, then went out to drop off Fraley's prescription at a local drugstore. She went back later; Ricky Simonds Sr., her incarcerated fiancé's father, who lived in the same apartment complex and did maintenance work there, drove her there and another neighbor drove her back. Fraley decided around 12 a.m. that she had something more serious and needed to go back to the hospital, and called her mother to let her know. At 1:30 a.m. April 8, she called a friend in Albemarle; during the call she mentioned that she was going back to the hospital. The call was cut short when Fraley apparently saw her ride, whom she referred to as "he", arrive.

Fraley never checked into the hospital the third time. Since that phone call, there has been no evidence of her presence anywhere.

== Investigation ==
Fraley had a Social Security Administration appointment the following day, but missed it. Her healthcare provider arrived to pick her up, but was unable to get an answer at the door and the apartment was locked. The healthcare worker called Fraley's mother, who then called the police to perform a welfare check. They found no evidence of forced entry or a struggle and Jamie was not in the apartment. Her family later arrived at the apartment and found her wallet, purse, keys, and identification, but not her cell phone. Nothing else was missing. There were no signs of a struggle, so they concluded she had left willingly, wherever she had gone. Unable to locate her, they called police and reported her missing.

Gaston County police launched a major investigation, putting all its investigators on the case, with three of them devoted to it full-time, and requesting assistance from both the state's Bureau of Investigation and the FBI. "I have never seen a missing person case worked this thoroughly", said Christie Rhoney, the chief detective. Two days after Fraley's disappearance, utility workers discovered her phone at an intersection roughly a mile (1.6 km) from her apartment.

By the time the phone was turned over to the police, too many people had handled it for any usable evidence, such as fingerprints, to be gained from the exterior. Searching through its call records, police found that several calls had been made at 4:30 a.m. However, they turned out to be from the list of calls Fraley had dialed earlier and were not connected to the disappearance. A call had been made to the phone at 5 a.m., but it could not be determined who it was from.

=== Ricky Simonds Sr. ===
Ricky Simonds Jr., Fraley's fiancé, was still imprisoned at the time of her disappearance, so investigators ruled him out as a suspect. They quickly refocused on his father, Ricky Simonds Sr. He, too, had a criminal record, including six years in prison for manslaughter in the 1980s after strangling a girlfriend to death.

Simonds Sr. lived in the same complex as Fraley, just two doors away, and did maintenance work there. He had driven her to the hospital the second time on the day she disappeared, making him one of the last people to see her that day. He refused to take a lie detector test.

Two months to the day after Fraley disappeared, however, the investigation into Simonds ended with his death. On June 7, Kim Sprenger, a former girlfriend who had recently obtained a protective order against him, noticed a foul odor in her car. It persisted, and the next day she opened the trunk. Inside, Sprenger found Simonds' body. Police investigating found he had a set of her car keys; a week earlier Sprenger's purse had been stolen from the car. The cause of death was ruled to be accidental heat stroke; during the previous days, high temperatures in the area had exceeded 90 °F (32 °C).

Police theorized that Simonds had used the keys to let himself into the trunk with the intent of ambushing Sprenger at some point, letting himself out with the working emergency latch. When heat exhaustion set in, however, it was possible that he had panicked and forgotten to use it, remaining in the trunk to die. After completing their investigation into Simonds' death, detectives told the media that he had been considered a person of interest in Fraley's disappearance, which remained an open case.

Members of both the Fraley and Simonds families believed Ricky Sr. had taken useful information about what happened to Fraley to his grave. Her mother, Kim, who had supplemented the official investigation with efforts of her own, recalled crying when she learned of his death.

Ricky Sr., she claimed, "was hiding something and we couldn't never get that out of him". Ricky Simonds Jr., by then released from prison, also said he believed his father, whom he described as being more of a friend, was aware of what had happened to Fraley, but generally found the unusual chain of circumstances overwhelming. "[F]irst my fiancé goes missing, then my dad climbs in a trunk and dies? Does that make sense to anybody?" he asked a local TV station.

=== 2015 possible confession ===
In 2015, Jerry Case, a man then serving federal prison time for kidnapping, made a possible confession regarding Fraley's disappearance. However, he had been incarcerated at that time.

When he confessed, Case was on trial for a 1985 murder in Gaston County which he had confessed to in a 2012 letter to the Gaston Gazette. In 2015 he wrote another letter to the Gazette, confessing to killing Fraley and another local woman who had been shot and killed in her house, which was then set on fire later that year. "I guess you could say this is confessions number two and three", he wrote.

Prosecutors immediately dismissed Case's confession as unlikely regarding Fraley, since he was incarcerated at the time she disappeared (although he was released a few weeks later) and he only provided details of the case that had already been made public. They also discounted his marginally probable confession regarding the later murder of the other local woman, though he had been free at the time the later homicide occurred.

== See also ==
- List of Disappeared episodes
- List of people who disappeared mysteriously (2000–present)
