= Disappearance of Tiffany Daniels =

2013 missing person case in Florida

Tiffany H. Daniels
- An image of Daniels distributed in the wake of her disappearance
- Born: March 11, 1988; Dallas, Texas, U.S.
- Disappeared: August 12, 2013 (aged 25); Pensacola, Florida, U.S.
- Status: Missing for 12 years, 8 months and 1 day
- Occupation: Theatre technician
- Employer: Pensacola State College
- Height: 5 ft 7 in (170 cm)

On August 12, 2013, at 4:43 p.m, Tiffany Daniels, a 25‑year‑old theater technician at Pensacola State College in Pensacola, Florida, left work after telling her supervisor she would not be returning for a few days but did not explain why. She briefly returned home afterwards, but her housemate, who was on the phone, did not see her. Daniels has not been seen since.

Because she had said she would be taking time off, Daniels was not reported missing until later that week when she failed to return to work. A security camera on the Pensacola Beach Bridge recorded her car crossing the bridge almost three hours after she left work. Eight days after her disappearance, the vehicle was found in a parking lot at Pensacola Beach with her bicycle, purse, and mobile phone inside. Residents reported that the car had only been there a few days and said they had seen an unidentified man near it, but searches of the surrounding area found no trace of Daniels.

Several theories have been proposed to explain her disappearance, including foul play, an accidental drowning, and human trafficking. Based on an anonymous tip and reported sightings along Interstate 10, her family believes she may have been abducted and could still be alive. The case was featured in a 2016 episode of the Investigation Discovery series Disappeared.

== Background ==
A native of the Dallas area, Tiffany Daniels was born on March 11, 1988, and distinguished herself in high school through her interest in art and her outgoing personality. Her family, who described her as "free-spirited,” say she could often lift the mood of those around her simply with her presence. Daniels enjoyed painting, and eventually took a job at the Pensacola State College theater in Pensacola, Florida, where she painted sets.

When she was not at work, Daniels took advantage of Pensacola's cultural and natural attractions. In the city's downtown, near her job, she often organized and attended blues and swing dance parties. From her house, a short distance from the Bob Sikes bridge to Santa Rosa Island in the Gulf of Mexico, she often went hiking or biking in the dunes. A pescetarian, she had tattooed four images atop her feet showing a plant's growth and blooming.

Despite her apparent satisfaction with her life, Daniels had financial problems. Her parents said that by summer of 2013 they had noticed she had a pattern of paying the rent for a series of housemates who were either disinclined or unable to pay their share. In July of that year, after another one had moved out, she advertised on Craigslist for a new roommate.

Gary Nichols, the 54-year-old father of one of her friends who was separating from his wife and wanted to live closer to his job, answered Daniels's ad and moved in. Daniels' parents were uneasy about her sharing living quarters with a man more than twice her age, but he was able to pay his share of the bills and the two had similar interests. Nichols, too, liked bicycling and followed a similar diet.

== Disappearance ==
On August 11, Daniels started the day with a farewell breakfast for her boyfriend, who had been accepted into the graduate robotics program at the University of Texas in Austin. He had encouraged her to move there with him, but she demurred. Daniels's friends said that while she still loved him and wanted to continue the relationship, to the point of making plans to visit him later in Austin, she was not ready to move from Pensacola yet. After the breakfast, he left. Nichols recalls that she was slightly depressed for the rest of the day, but that was tempered with enthusiasm for a later visit to Austin, a town her friends believed she could easily adapt to.

Daniels and the theater department were scheduled to start preparing sets for a production of Spamalot that fall. That night, she and Nichols decided to watch Monty Python and the Holy Grail, the film on which that musical is based, for inspiration and relaxation, after which the two retired to their bedrooms as they both had to work the next morning. At 5 a.m., Nichols recalled that he heard the door to the house open and close several times. He looked outside from his room, thinking it might be Daniels, but did not see her.

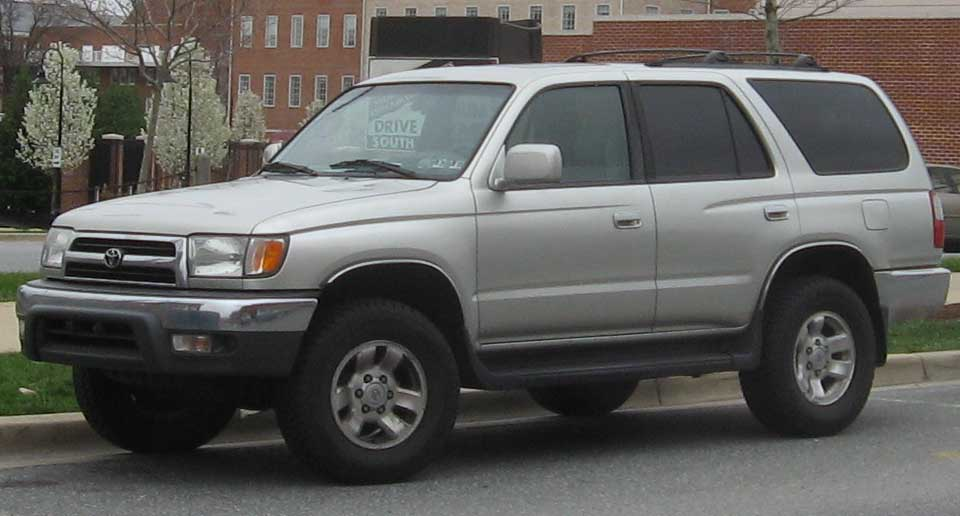
A 1999 Toyota 4Runner similar to Tiffany Daniels'

When Nichols got up later and left for work around 7 a.m., Daniels's car, a gray Toyota 4Runner, was gone. He assumed she, too, had gone to work. Her parents, however, say it was unusual for her to get up early; in situations where she had to, she would usually leave only right before the time she had to be wherever it was.

Daniels arrived at work on schedule for the beginning of her shift painting sets. She asked her supervisor if she could leave a little early that day, and also let him know that she would be taking some time off, possibly the whole week, but did not explain why other than "things she had to take care of." He assented, and she punched out at 4:43 p.m. as she left the theater. No one has reported seeing her since.

That night, Nichols grew concerned when Daniels had not returned home by 10 p.m. She did not return his calls. He called his daughter Noel, who told him not to worry as Daniels was an adult and might want to hang out with friends closer to her age. He agreed with her and went to bed.

Nichols again attempted to call Daniels when she had not returned by the next morning, but again could not reach her. That evening, he returned and found that the electricity to the house had been turned off. He assumed that his housemate had failed to pay her share and again called his daughter to inform her that Daniels still had not returned. This time he suggested she get in touch with her parents, which she did via a private Facebook message.

Noel and Daniels' mother Cindy soon began working through the extensive list of Daniels's friends that they knew of. None had seen her all week either; they all assumed that if she was anywhere she was visiting other people she knew, all of whom Cindy and Noel had already called. Meanwhile, Daniels had not turned up. By the end of the week they realized it was time to call the police and report her missing.

== Investigation ==
Cindy initially went to the Escambia County sheriff's office, which seemed to her to be dismissive of the case. They took the information she gave them but seemed to believe that her daughter had gone out partying and would turn up soon of her own accord. However, because Daniels had been living in the city of Pensacola and was last seen there, he referred the case to that city's police department, who Cindy regarded as showing much more interest in the case.

Detective Daniel Harnett met Cindy at Tiffany's house and searched it. He found no signs of foul play, and Tiffany's tent was still in her room. Harnett realized that if she had decided to leave town, she was not going camping.

When Harnett learned that Tiffany's boyfriend had left Pensacola the day before, he began exploring that angle. He had called Daniels upon his arrival in Austin on the 11th, but not at all on the 12th. He was cooperative and provided fingerprints and DNA samples, and his cell-phone records showed he had indeed been in the Austin area all weekend, suggesting he had not secretly returned to Pensacola.

Harnett also considered that perhaps Tiffany had been depressed over his departure. Her sister later told Disappeared that she had seemed a little less vivacious than usual earlier in 2013. But she had plans for the immediate future: besides the trip to Austin she had planned a dance in two weeks time. It did not seem like she had taken her own life, or started a new one elsewhere.

The investigation did find, however, that at some point after her early departure from work Daniels returned to her house briefly. Nichols was present at the time, and talking on the phone with his own girlfriend out of state, but does not recall her presence. Cindy is skeptical that he could have missed that she was there, both due to an open space between the top of her closet wall and Nichols' statement that he had heard the front door opening and closing in the morning, but police believe his account and do not consider him to have engaged in any wrongdoing, noting that he was the first to raise concern about Tiffany's whereabouts.

=== Discovery of car ===
Over the first weekend after Tiffany disappeared, the case was publicized. The news media reported on it, and her friends and family distributed fliers on the street and posted them. Early the next week, it produced the first evidence related to her disappearance.

A jogger, who also was a friend of Tiffany’s family, recognized Daniels's 4Runner in a parking lot at Park West in Pensacola Beach near Fort Pickens, at the western end of Santa Rosa Island, on August 20, eight days after she had last been seen. She had often gone hiking in the nearby dunes of Gulf Islands National Seashore, despite her mother's warnings not to go to the beach alone (Cindy says that the car's discovery there suggested to her something terrible had happened to her daughter). Within it were Daniels's bicycle, cell phone, purse with wallet, some clothes, paintings, a jug of water and a jar of peanut butter.

After it was towed to the police garage for examination, investigators found two fingerprints, one on the door handle and the other on the steering wheel, that could not be matched to Daniels or any of the investigators who had worked on the car. A resident of a nearby condominium said the car had "definitely" not been there until two days earlier. Two other residents said that they had seen a man getting out of the car earlier that day.

To establish when the car had been driven to the island, Harnett examined security camera footage from the toll booths at the Bob Sikes Bridge, the only road connection between Pensacola and the island. They showed that the 4Runner had passed through the tolls at 7:51 p.m. on the evening Daniels had disappeared. It could not be determined from the footage if she was driving the car, which remains in the police impound lot, its contents intact, in case new information comes to light for which it might be relevant.

The question still remained as to whether anyone had seen anything or anyone who might have left the car in the parking lot where it was found. Two large residential complexes serving the island's summer vacation population are adjacent to it; it was possible someone there might have seen something. Friends and family again circulated flyers in the area and canvassed residents, but found no leads.

At the police garage, investigators found sand on the bicycle tires but none on the cars floorboards. This suggested to Harnett the possibility that if Daniels had gone for a bike ride on the beach that evening, she might have decided to go for a swim afterwards (a friend of hers noted that the Perseid meteor shower was happening at that time, which he said was the sort of thing she might have decided to watch on the beach). If she had, it was possible that she had drowned. However, no bodies were found on the shore, and Harnett says it is usually common for them to wash up after a drowning.

It was also possible that Daniels had met with an accident or foul play somewhere on land. However, there was then no way to be sure. Santa Rosa Island is 50 miles (80 km) long, and the police did not have enough manpower to search even its beaches, much less the dunes, thickly vegetated in some areas. The weekend after the car was found, the KlaasKids, a volunteer organization founded in the wake of the Polly Klaas case, in coordination with local police and the U.S. National Park Service, which has jurisdiction over the National Seashore, searched much of the island with humans and search dogs. A few fragments of clothing and pieces of jewelry were found, but they did not belong to Daniels.

== Possible Louisiana sighting ==
With all searches and investigative procedures in Pensacola exhausted, no further physical evidence was likely. Daniels' friends and family set up a Facebook page to further the search and found themselves busy sorting through the many tips that initially poured in. One, from a convenience store clerk who claimed to have seen her several days after she had last been seen, seemed credible at first, as he recalled her foot tattoos. However, the store's security camera footage for that day failed to corroborate the account.

Several months after Daniels' disappearance, in January 2014, the Facebook page yielded what her parents considered a more credible report of a later sighting. A woman who worked as a waitress at a restaurant in Metairie, Louisiana, outside New Orleans, reported that shortly after the disappearance she had seen a woman matching Daniels's description come in with two other women, one roughly the same age and the other older, possibly Latina, and more nicely dressed. The younger women behaved strangely, both wearing long-sleeved shirts despite the warm weather, with the cuffs pulled over their hands, and never looking the waitress in the eye. They seemed to let the older woman do most of the talking for the group. When the waitress told one of the younger women she looked like that woman who had been reported missing in Florida, the group got up and left. Unfortunately the restaurant's security cameras had been taped over since the date of the encounter and thus it was impossible to find any documentary confirmation of the waitress' story.

Tiffany's parents strongly believe this was her, for two reasons. First was that putting her sleeves over her hands was something she frequently did when she was cold. Second, the waitress recalled that the woman who resembled Tiffany had, when looking over the soups on the menu, asked whether one of them used a fish or chicken broth. Cindy recalled a similar incident when she had been eating out with her daughter and the restaurant had substituted chicken broth in Tiffany's soup since it had run out of fish broth, a difference Tiffany could taste as she was a pescetarian and normally avoided any chicken-based foods.

The Daniels family began to fear that Tiffany had not been found because she had somehow left Pensacola during that week between the last sighting and the beginning of the search—and not voluntarily. They began researching human trafficking as a possible explanation. They saw possible similarities between Daniels's unsolved case and that of another woman who had recently been drugged and abducted from nearby Panama City and taken to New Orleans by two men who told her she was to work as a prostitute.

While traffickers prefer to target women in their late teens, according to experts, they will occasionally attempt to abduct women closer to Daniels's age, and her parents believe she would have been trusting enough to fall for whatever pretext they used to approach their daughter. Interstate 10, which passes through Pensacola and New Orleans, has been described as one of the major trafficking routes in the U.S. Harnett, however, says he has found no evidence to support the trafficking theory, although he qualifies that by saying police have ruled nothing out at this point.

== Subsequent developments ==
The second anniversary of Daniels's disappearance, in 2015, led to two developments in the case. The Investigation Discovery (ID) cable network decided to revive its series Disappeared, which profiles missing-persons cases, and Daniels's case was one of those chosen. A crew from ID went to Pensacola, filmed locations associated with the case and re-enactments, and interviewed Harnett, Tiffany's parents, sister, and some of her friends who had helped with the investigation. The episode aired in April 2016.

Before the episode aired, the first new evidence in the case since the original investigation surfaced. In December 2015, the Daniels family and the police disclosed that in the wake of coverage of the case's second anniversary four months earlier, a citizen had come forward and told the police that on the day Daniels's car was discovered, they had seen a man in his thirties wearing red shorts and no shirt opening up the car's tailgate, a report consistent with the two witnesses who said they saw a man leave the car after it was parked there. The witness remembered this because the car had been parked unusually, facing oncoming traffic, in an area reserved for wildlife.

Around the 10th anniversary of Daniels' disappearance, a mural depicting her and calling attention to the case was painted on Pensacola's Graffiti Bridge.

== See also ==
- List of people who disappeared mysteriously (2000–present)
- List of Disappeared episodes
