= Disappearance of Kayla Berg =

2009 disappearance in Wisconsin, US

Kayla Berg
- Berg on June 19, 2009, two months before her disappearance
- Born: Kayla May Berg; August 29, 1994; Wausau, Wisconsin, U.S.
- Disappeared: August 11, 2009; Antigo, Wisconsin, U.S.
- Status: Missing for 17 years, 3 months and 11 days
- Height: 5 ft 2 in (157 cm)
- Mother: Hope Sprenger

Kayla May Berg (born August 29, 1994) is an American teenager who went missing on August 11, 2009, in Antigo, Wisconsin, United States. She was last seen when a friend drove her near a house where she believed her boyfriend was staying. Berg never returned home, and she did not make contact with family or friends after that evening. Police have conducted repeated searches, but no clear answers have emerged about what happened to her. The case is still unsolved.

== Background ==
Kayla May Berg was born in Wausau, Wisconsin, United States, and grew up in central Wisconsin. She attended Antigo High School, where she was known by friends and family as an active and social teenager who enjoyed spending time with classmates. Berg was passionate about dance and gymnastics, was a member of the school's dance team, and had aspirations of becoming a choreographer. She regularly divided her time between her mother's home in Antigo and her father's residence in Wausau.

== Disappearance ==
Locations
1 McDonalds, Wisconsin

On the evening of August 11, 2009, Berg asked a friend of her brother, 24-year-old Kevin Kielcheski, to drive her to meet her boyfriend. Her mother said Kielcheski had long been a friend of Berg's older brother and had frequently visited their home, noting that he was not considered a stranger to the family. Police later reported that there may have been some marijuana use during the outing. Kielcheski picked her up from her father's home at about 8:30 p.m., and according to investigators, the pair stopped at a McDonald's around 9:30 p.m.. Berg went inside to chat briefly with a friend who was working that night, mentioning that she planned to ride around in the car for a while. Kielcheski told investigators that he had dropped her off at the home of her on-again, off-again boyfriend, Miguel Marrero, in Wausau. That house had been condemned and was under renovation, according to Berg's mother and CNN reports. Berg's mother had reportedly been wary of the relationship, as Marrero was 19 years old while Berg was only 14. She also did not have a cell phone or computer that could be tracked. Berg never returned home, and her family reported her missing six days later, due to confusion about her whereabouts. Initial searches focused on the areas surrounding the abandoned house and nearby streets.

The Federal Bureau of Investigation (FBI) lists Berg as a missing person on its website and offers a $20,000 reward for information leading to the arrest and conviction of anyone involved in her disappearance. Family members described Kayla as responsible and careful, making her sudden disappearance alarming. They noted that she had been looking forward to starting school and reuniting with friends, which made the abrupt end to her routine particularly concerning. The unusual circumstances of being dropped off at a condemned property raised questions about her intended plans and the people she was supposed to meet that evening. According to her mother, Berg knew that Marrero had just moved and had already been over to his new house; as such, it did not make sense for her to be dropped off at the location of his former home.

== Investigation ==
After Berg was reported missing, local police and the Wisconsin Division of Criminal Investigation interviewed family members, friends, and her boyfriend, who was four years older than her. Authorities said he cooperated, and no evidence linked him to her disappearance. Police also followed up on tips from other places, but none led to a confirmed sighting of Berg. Law enforcement brought in cadaver dogs to sweep the location, and the car that transported her was impounded and examined for evidence. No trace of Berg was found, and investigators quickly expanded the search to include nearby woods, vacant lots, and other abandoned properties where she might have been seen.

In 2017, Berg's case was featured on the Investigation Discovery program Disappeared, which brought new attention and tips. Her mother continues to hold events on Berg's birthday to remind people about her missing daughter and encourage anyone with information to come forward. The case is still open, and police ask anyone with information to report it. No confirmed evidence has been found that explains what happened to Berg.

As of 2026, Berg remains missing, with law enforcement continuing to treat the case as active.

== Hoax ==
In October 2016, a video titled "Hi Walter! I got new gf today!" resurfaced online. The video showed a young woman crying in a basement, and had originally been posted two months after Berg's disappearance. Some viewers noted a resemblance in appearance and voice to Berg. The Antigo Police Department reviewed the video, and after contacting its creators, determined that the clip had been staged and was not connected to Berg's disappearance.

== See also ==
- List of people who disappeared mysteriously (2000–present)
