= Disappearance of Toni Sharpless =

Pennsylvania disappearance case

Coordinates: 40.0349°N 75.2591°W

Toni Sharpless
- Undated image of Sharpless distributed after her disappearance
- Born: December 27, 1979; Downingtown, Pennsylvania, U.S.
- Disappeared: August 23, 2009 (aged 29); Penn Valley, Pennsylvania, U.S.
- Status: Missing for 17 years, 2 months and 29 days
- Education: Brandywine College of Nursing (BScN)
- Occupation: Nurse
- Years active: 2007–2009
- Employer: Lancaster General Hospital

In the early hours of August 23, 2009, Toni Sharpless (born December 27, 1979) and her friend Crystal Johns left a party at the home of Philadelphia 76er Willie Green in Penn Valley, Pennsylvania, United States. Not long after leaving, Johns suggested to Sharpless, whose erratic and combative behavior had led Green to ask that they leave, that she was not sober enough to drive; in response, Sharpless pulled over and told Johns to get out, which she did, and then drove off. Neither Sharpless nor her vehicle have been seen since then.

An early theory, that she might have accidentally driven her car into the nearby Schuylkill River, was discarded when searches of the river were fruitless. An apparent break in the case came two weeks later when an automatic license plate reader recorded her 2002 Pontiac Grand Prix's plates among parked vehicles in Camden, New Jersey, across the Delaware River from Philadelphia. There had been other reported sightings of Sharpless in Camden, but police there were unable to locate the vehicle or find any information about where it had been found.

In 2013, the writer of an anonymous letter sent to Eileen Law, a private investigator handling the case, claimed that he had been hired to take the Pontiac to a shop in the Boston area in exchange for $5,000 in cash and the Grand Prix's license plates after Sharpless was killed during a confrontation with a Camden police officer. The writer did not personally know of any details about what had happened to Sharpless but included in his letter the number of her cell phone, missing along with her, and the last five digits of the car's vehicle identification number, information that had not been made public. Both were correct.

Police dismissed the letter as a hoax despite the details, but Law, whose theory is that Sharpless is alive and being held captive by human traffickers, believes it was genuine and continues to investigate. In 2011, the Investigation Discovery channel's series Disappeared devoted an episode to the case.

== Background ==
Toni Sharpless, a native of the Philadelphia suburb of Downingtown, Pennsylvania, was born in 1979. Her father died in an accident when she was six; her mother Donna soon after remarried Peter Knebel, who raised Toni and her sister Candy as his own daughters. In her late teens Toni had a daughter of her own.

Sharpless's childhood and young adulthood were marked by her struggles with bipolar disorder, a condition only diagnosed in her adulthood. She and her family kept that information to themselves, and even after learning she was bipolar the difficulties caused by the disorder persisted as doctors tried different combinations of different medications to control it.

Her condition had also led to problems with drug and alcohol abuse. In 2008 she was arrested and convicted of driving while intoxicated; she spent the month of April 2009 in rehab. After that she found a drug combination that seemed to work and that was contraindicated for alcohol consumption; she did not always take them, however.

On weekends during the 2000s, Sharpless worked as a nursing assistant at a local rehabilitation center, living with her daughter and parents in West Brandywine Township. The money she earned from that job went to pay her tuition at Brandywine School of Nursing. After earning her degree in 2007, Sharpless took a job in the infectious disease ward at Lancaster General Hospital.

== Disappearance ==
On the evening of August 22, 2009, a Saturday, Sharpless left her home around 9:30 p.m. for a night on the town in Center City (downtown Philadelphia) with her friend Crystal Johns. After she left, Peter Knebel expressed his reservations about the outing to his wife. Sharpless and Johns had only recently renewed their friendship after becoming estranged from each other a decade earlier; Knebel believed that the evening trip to the city had been Johns' idea and that his stepdaughter, who typically devoted her free time to her own daughter and rarely went to nightclubs or bars, or into Philadelphia at all, only went because Johns had persuaded her to. But they also recognized that Sharpless had been working hard for a long time and had not had an evening out in a while.

The two women left in Sharpless's car, a black 2002 Pontiac Grand Prix sedan. After stopping at Johns' house in West Fallowfield Township, they went to Ice, a club in King of Prussia, then to Center City's G Lounge nightclub.

From there they went to a party at the home of Willie Green, a professional basketball player with the NBA's Philadelphia 76ers, in Penn Valley, a neighborhood in Lower Merion Township, one of the city's affluent Main Line suburbs. Accounts differ as to whether Johns, who was reportedly friends with Green's brother, had been invited there before she and Sharpless left for the evening or whether Green met the two at G Lounge and invited them back to his house.

Johns and Sharpless left Center City for the party shortly after 3 a.m. on August 23. Unable to sleep that night, Sharpless's daughter had texted her within the previous hour; Sharpless responded at 2:57 a.m with a text of her own, telling her daughter to get to sleep and that she would be home soon. Her phone has not been used since; it was turned off around 4 a.m.

At Green's, Sharpless and Johns began drinking along with other guests at what has been characterized as more of a small gathering than a party. The group was playing the board game Taboo, during which Sharpless reportedly made a remark to Johns that Green took as including an ethnic slur, although it was not intended that way.

Green made it known that he was offended, and Sharpless, who already felt that other guests were ridiculing her, became angry and erratic. Around 5 a.m., she reportedly dumped a bottle of champagne on the kitchen floor and began kicking things. Green went to Johns, who had retreated to the house's swimming pool, and told her that it was time for her and Sharpless to go home.

As the pair gathered their possessions and left the house, Johns, aware that she had had less to drink, attempted to take the car keys, but Sharpless immediately took them back. She was still angry and crying, accusing Johns of also making fun of her. A man called out from the house, jokingly warning them to be careful not to hit any other cars.

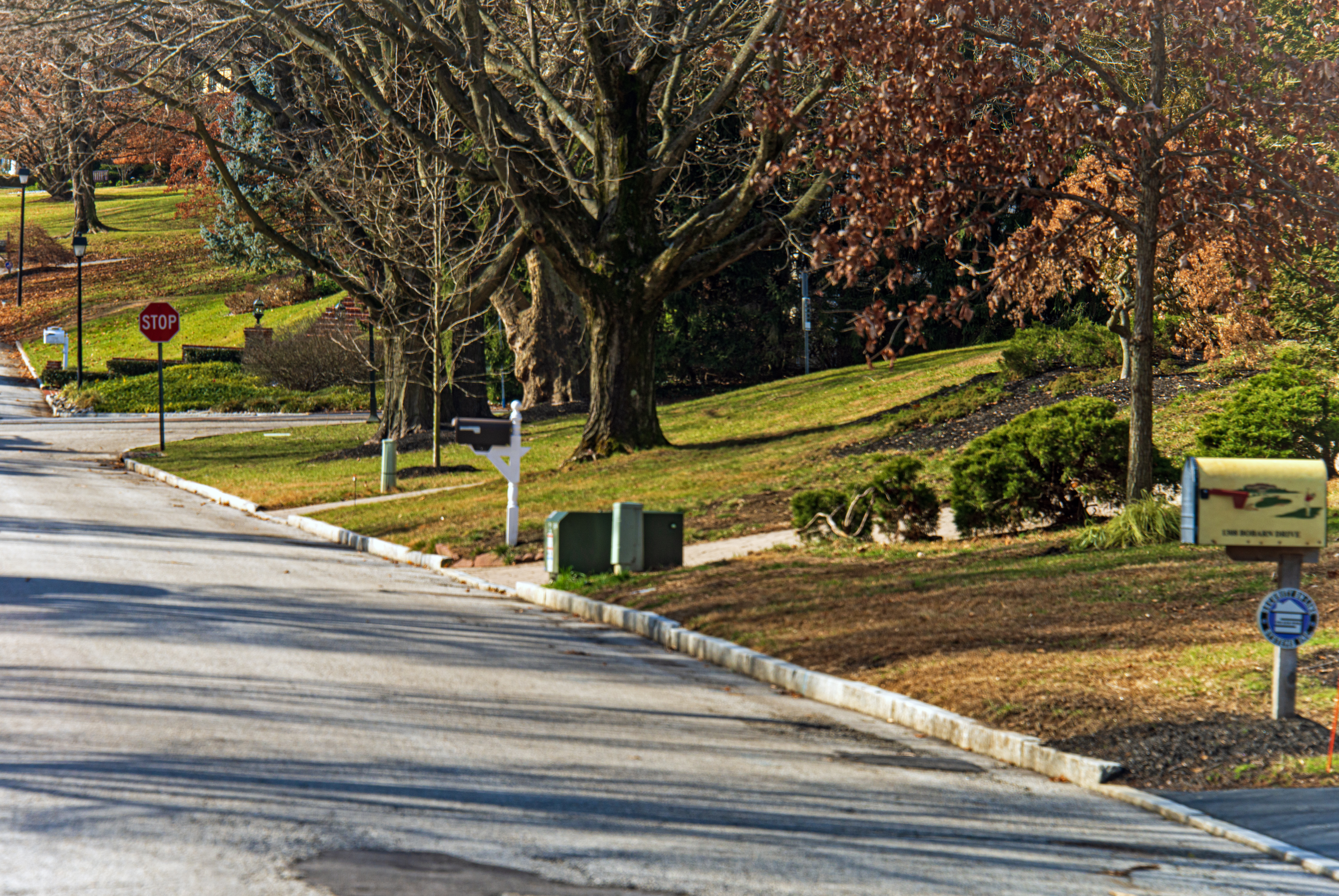
Curb where Sharpless threw Johns out of her car, shown in 2020

Once they were back in Sharpless's Pontiac, Johns, who later told police that neither of them were sober enough to legally drive, asked Sharpless whether she should really be driving in her condition given her previous conviction for drunk driving; she had also, at that point, been awake for 36 hours straight. Her response was to stop immediately and tell Johns to "get the fuck out of my car", which Johns did, and then Sharpless drove off. No one is known to have seen her since then.

== Investigation ==
Johns expected at first that her friend would soon calm down, reconsider her action, and return for her. When that did not happen within a few minutes, she called Sharpless; the call went to voicemail. Johns was still too embarrassed by the circumstances of their departure from Green's house to walk the 500 feet (150 m) back there and seek help, so after waiting a little longer she called her nephew for a ride home.

Later that morning, Johns called Candy Sharpless to complain that Toni had abandoned her and said she would come around later to return some items Toni had left at her house. Candy told her that Toni had not returned, whereupon Johns called the police. Candy later filed a missing persons report.

Sharpless's friends and family made and distributed flyers, while the Lower Merion Township police put out bulletins for her car. Speculation at first focused on the possibility that the intoxicated, sleep-deprived Sharpless had driven down a boat ramp by mistake and ended up in the nearby Schuylkill River. A Texas firm hired to search the river using side-scan sonar found 12 vehicles, nine of which had been reported stolen and three that were untraceable since the vehicle identification numbers (VINs) had been removed. None were the Grand Prix.

In September, two weeks after Sharpless disappeared, an automated license plate reader in Camden, New Jersey, just across the Delaware River from Philadelphia, recorded a hit on Sharpless's car's license plate number. The Camden police did not notify Lower Merion until a few days afterward, and efforts to locate the vehicle in Camden or nearby were unsuccessful. In late October, police records show they worked their last lead, although the case remains open.

=== Eileen Law ===
In October, Donna Knebel retained Eileen Law, a private investigator with an agency in Kennett Square, to find her daughter. A segment on CNN's Nancy Grace captured Law's attention. She took the case for a symbolic fee of $1 in order to make it legal; the dollar bill Knebel gave her remains on her desk and photographs of Sharpless are on her office wall.

Law set up a website and hotline number. Many tips were phoned into her office; callers reported sighting Sharpless and/or her vehicle all over the Philadelphia area, from Lancaster, where Sharpless worked, to Kennett Square. Another woman, who worked a night shift doing security in Conshohocken, said that as she returned home one night at 1 a.m. she saw an apparently abandoned black sedan in Camden beneath an overpass after crossing the Benjamin Franklin Bridge. She notified the police there, but they had no record of the call.

Due to that tip and others, Law came to believe that Sharpless's disappearance had some connection to Camden. Donna Knebel told LNP that her daughter, who had a poor sense of direction even under ideal conditions, may have headed for the nearby Schuylkill Expressway, part of Interstate 76, to return home after evicting Johns. However, the nearest exit to where she was, Hollow Road, only allows eastbound entry, not westbound, which Sharpless would have wanted in order to return home.

Going eastbound on I-76 would have taken Sharpless toward Philadelphia and Camden. Law notes that the Grand Prix was very low on gas when Sharpless and Johns had left for the evening, with less than a quarter of the tank full, and Sharpless could likely have run out of gas soon after she left. Without her ATM card, she might have also been short of money to refuel and thus would have had to rely on whomever she encountered to help her.

Law soon came to believe that Sharpless was still alive, perhaps forced into prostitution against her will. From the different places where her tips placed Sharpless, Law conjectured that she was being moved around. In 2010, when the producers of the Investigation Discovery channel's series Disappeared went to the Philadelphia area, Law found that their interest was piqued because Sharpless's car remained missing along with her, so Law took them to some of the neighborhoods her tips had led her to; the episode aired in 2011. Law's efforts to find Sharpless have taken her as far from Philadelphia as New Jersey's Pine Barrens.

==== 2012 anonymous letter ====
In December 2012, Law received a letter, handwritten on a yellow legal-size paper, purportedly from a "Tony Sharpless", postmarked November 29 of that year in Trenton, New Jersey. The writer said that they had tried to give their information to the Philadelphia police but had been told the case was not in their jurisdiction; an officer there had taken them aside and given them Law's address.

The writer claimed they had been contacted by a friend near the end of September 2009 and offered $5,000 in cash to take the Grand Prix, then in Brooklawn, New Jersey, near Camden, to a shop in Boston. If they completed that trip, the writer said, they were told they could also have the vehicle's license plates. Additionally, they were asked if they knew anyone in their late 20s who wanted to "paper-trip"—which Law says refers to an attempt to create a new identity and would be a term used only by police or criminals—and was offered a Social Security card to give to such a person.

Since the writer had needed the money, they had taken the job and delivered the car to Boston the next day. When they delivered it, they not only took the license plates but also cleared out the glove compartment and implied that they had found Sharpless's cell phone. They also wrote down the car's vehicle identification number (VIN).

Upon their return to Camden, the friend gave them more information about the car and why they had had to take it to a chop shop out of state. It was not stolen, they said, but missing. A friend of the friend was a Camden police officer and he "got into a fight with a girl; she died and he needed to get the car out of Jersey". The writer did not, they stressed, have firsthand knowledge that this was Sharpless or what exactly had happened.

The reason the writer had waited so long to write was that they had put the plates and Social Security card into a box in their garage and forgotten about it, until their daughter had recently rediscovered it while playing. They had gone back to New Jersey to help some friends affected by Hurricane Sandy and decided to write the letter.

As proof of the account, the letter included not only the license plate number of the Grand Prix, but also the last five digits of its VIN and Sharpless's cell phone number, represented as her Social Security number. The plate number had been widely disseminated during the initial media coverage of the disappearance, so by itself it would not prove the writer knew anything, but the latter two numbers had not been made public and were also correct. While Law was skeptical of some aspects of the story, and at the time said she was not sure if it was authentic, in 2017 she told Chadds Ford Live that an email she received in 2013 corroborated some aspects of it and that she now regarded the account as plausible. West Brandywine police chief Walter Werner, whose department continues to work with both the Lower Merion police and the New Jersey State Police to investigate Sharpless's disappearance, noted that the Grand Prix's VIN is included in reports on the case that would be widely available to anyone in law enforcement.

Around the same time, police also received two potentially promising tips by phone that turned out to be hoaxes. The first, from someone claiming to be an officer of the Canadian Security Intelligence Service who had found both the car and a woman matching Sharpless's description on the property of the agency's Toronto offices, was from a false address and phone number; the Toronto Police also did not have the woman in custody as the caller claimed. The second was purportedly from a deputy sheriff in South Dakota who claimed he had recovered the Grand Prix; officers at the department in question said no one by the name he gave worked there. Both calls, according to Werner, were made by the same person.

After turning the letter over to the West Brandywine police, Law disclosed it to the media in early 2013. The Lower Merion and Camden police departments both said they had not been made aware of it before reporters called to ask them about it. Police chief Werner said the letter would be examined by forensic specialists to see what evidence could be developed from it. In 2016, Law said she did not know what, if anything, police had done with the letter.

== Theories ==
Sharpless's family and friends have been suspicious of Johns since the disappearance. They note that she pleaded guilty to harassment charges in 2005 and question her story. "Toni would never, never, leave another woman on a dark street in Philadelphia", said one of her friends. "And what woman in her right mind would get out of the car there and wait an hour?" Donna Knebel is not even sure that the last text from her daughter's phone was actually written by her; she also questions why Green's house was not searched.

Peter Knebel and Gigi Hayes, a nursing school friend of Sharpless, have both publicly speculated that Johns' account might be a cover story for an incident that occurred at the party. "[Toni] didn't burn her bridges with her parents", Hayes said. "There was no reason why she couldn't come home", The Knebels have, on the advice of police, not tried to contact Johns; they say she has not contacted them either.

The Lower Merion police have cleared Johns of any involvement. Phone records confirm both her attempt to call Sharpless around the time the two parted company and, later, her call to her nephew. Johns also passed a lie detector test, the police said. Green, too, has been cleared; police described him as "more than willing to cooperate". He has never spoken publicly about the case. All the other guests at his house that morning have also been ruled out as having any involvement.

Law, too, believes Johns' account. Sharpless's friend has been "burned at the stake", she says, but in addition to the polygraph she passed, the detective cites her own interview. She came by Johns uninvited, and instead of asking her to leave, Johns took her questions, some of them designed to catch deceptive behavior, for three hours. "[S]he was unbelievably distraught and I don't believe she had anything to do with it", Law says.

As of 2017, Knebel believes her daughter to be dead. Law, however, continues to investigate her theory that Sharpless was taken by human traffickers, who would have taken her cell phone and credit cards as soon as they could. In 2011 she told a reporter from Philadelphia that a woman she described as "a dancer in a Midwestern city" contacted her, claiming to have met Sharpless; her descriptions of the woman's body piercings and stretch marks were confirmed by Donna Knebel.

Five years later, Law noted that there are many cases where abducted people have been found after many years. She ascribed some of the difficulty in solving the case to having four separate law enforcement agencies in two states working some aspect of it. "I wish we could just get everyone in the same room to share information", she said. "Maybe someone would come up with something that no one had considered before".

== See also ==
- List of Disappeared episodes
- List of people who disappeared mysteriously: post-1970
