= Murder of Robert Wykel =

1996 murder of Seattle man; killer convicted but body never found

- Wykel circa his 1996 disappearance
- Date: February 23, 1996 (aged 65)
- Location: Yelm, Washington, U.S.
- Convicted: Myron Wynn
- Charges: First-degree murder
- Verdict: Guilty

Robert James Wykel (born May 18, 1930; disappeared February 23, 1996) was a retired sheet metal worker from Burien, Washington, United States, who restored classic cars. He has not been seen by anyone who could positively identify him since 1996, when he went to see a Ford Thunderbird he was interested in purchasing. Myron Wynn, who accompanied him at that time, was convicted 15 years later of murdering Wykel. Wynn maintains that he is innocent and that Wykel went to Argentina.

The case was treated as a missing person investigation for years, despite early suspicion centering on Wynn, whom police named as a person of interest shortly afterwards. Prosecutors charged him with the crime in 2009, although they had not found Wykel's body. They relied on his conflicting and evasive statements to police during the initial investigation, and a diamond Wynn gave to his then girlfriend shortly after Wykel's disappearance. Police believed the diamond belonged to Wykel, suggesting robbery as his motive for the murder. After Wynn's first trial in 2010 ended in a hung jury, he was retried, convicted and sentenced to 20 years in prison. The verdict was sustained on appeal. The case has been featured in an episode of the Investigation Discovery series Disappeared. Wykel's body remains undiscovered.

== Background ==
Wykel, a native of Illinois who had owned restaurants there and in New Mexico, had gone west to work on the Alaska pipeline. His work had also taken him to foreign countries.

In the early 1990s, he settled in the Seattle suburb of Burien, where he had had a successful career as a sheet metal worker and was able to take advantage of the area's abundant opportunities for the outdoor recreation activities he enjoyed. His former wife still lived in Illinois, near their daughter and her family, but the two had been talking about reconciling and reuniting.

After retiring, he supplemented his pension by buying classic cars at auto auctions, restoring them, and reselling them for a profit. He restored a 1989 Mercedes-Benz, which he drove as his own. His other passion, fine jewelry, showed in a ring with a 1.25-carat diamond in a distinctive European cut, which he wore constantly, even when working on cars.

He often met with other retirees mornings to socialize over coffee at a White Center McDonald's . In early 1996, the men were joined by Myron Wynn, a younger man who sometimes went by the name of Myron Holdredge or Michael Holdredge. He gravitated toward Wykel, seeking out opportunities to associate with him. At the time Wynn was unemployed, supported by a girlfriend, with whom he lived.

Wynn told Wykel that he had learned that a soldier at Fort Lewis, near Tacoma, was offering a mid-1950s Ford Thunderbird for sale. Wykel, who had long been looking for one, gave Wynn a thousand dollars as a deposit on the eventual sale of the car. Bank records show that Wykel also withdrew $5,200 from his account in cash, the way he preferred to pay, to complete the transaction.

Wynn put off Wykel repeatedly when the older man pressed him as to when he could get the car. Wykel in turn was growing increasingly frustrated with his putative middleman. At a weekly poker game with friends and neighbors whom he excitedly told about the Thunderbird on previous occasions, Wykel said he was either going to get his money back from Wynn or the car. On February 21, Wykel said he had finally made arrangements to pick up the car the next morning.

== Disappearance ==
No one who knew Robert Wykel saw or heard from him after that. His initial absence was not unusual, as his trips to get cars sometimes took a few days. John Ogdon, a younger neighbor, who was part of the same weekly poker game, was a little surprised at first that Wykel had not come to his house to show off the car he had been waiting so long to get, as he often did.

When Wykel did not attend the next poker game, Ogdon became concerned. He noticed that Wykel's Mercedes was not in his driveway, either. He called 9-1-1 to report Wykel missing, but was told that it was not against the law if Wykel had chosen to disappear.

Meanwhile, in Illinois, Wykel's family there was also concerned. He was not returning any phone messages, something he usually did within a short time. Their messages on his answering machine showed their increasing worry.

Ogdon kept an eye on Wykel's house, noting that mail piled up. He looked through it over the next couple of weeks for clues that might explain Wykel's absence. On March 13, he found a notice that Wykel's Mercedes, which had apparently been in a nearby park and ride lot, had been impounded.

This news disturbed Ogdon. The car's location was not unusual; he knew Wykel customarily took public transportation when he expected to buy a car, so that he could return home in the new purchase. However, the lot was only five blocks from his house, so he usually walked to it. Even if he had driven, he would not have used the Mercedes. Indeed, Wykel would often park the Mercedes in Ogdon's driveway when he left the area .

Furthermore, Ogdon read in the impound notice that the car had first been seen at the lot a few days earlier, while Wykel had been gone for three weeks. He believed someone else, familiar with Wykel's habits, might have put the car there. When Ogdon called police with this information, they agreed to open a missing persons investigation.

== Investigation ==
A detective with the King County Sheriff's Office (KCSO), who responded, entered Wykel's house. In the kitchen, he found dishes in the sink and food, rotting on the countertop, coffee in the pot and an unfinished drink. Wykel's closets were full, and his luggage was in the house. Police concluded that Wykel had not expected to be gone long and intended to return.

Police opened the Mercedes and searched for clues. They found no fingerprints, but did find Wykel's empty wallet.

After Ogdon informed Rebecca Lee, Wykel's daughter, that her father had been missing for two weeks and police were investigating, she came to the Seattle area to assist in the search. She informed the media, who ran stories about the case. Police were hoping that someone might come forward with information about a botched robbery or accident, but no leads developed.

From his daughter, police learned of Wykel's background and theorized that he might have decided to travel abroad. He had taken his children to Argentina, a country he particularly liked, once when he worked there so they could experience another culture. He still had friends there and talked of returning some day. However, his passport was still in the house, the police found no records of travel plans, and his bank account showed no activity since the withdrawal of the $5,200.

The only other possibility was the Thunderbird Wykel had been ready to purchase with that money. Ogdon recalled that Wykel had been losing his patience with the person, who had said he could arrange the purchase, but never heard Wykel mention the man's name. Lee learned of her father's breakfasts at the McDonald's and went to visit the men herself.

They, too, had noticed and been concerned by Wykel's disappearance. They told her that the younger man, who had told Wykel about the car and that they recalled as Mike, had also not returned to eat with them since the time Wykel disappeared. They found his last name, Wynn, in his signature on a goodbye card the group had given the restaurant's manager, who was about to leave the job.

=== Focus on Wynn ===
Before anyone else could find Mike Wynn, he called Lee at her hotel, and told her he had gotten her number from her father's landlady. He said he had only recently returned from a trip out of town and learned about Wykel's disappearance. As far as he knew, he told her, Wykel had gone on an extended trip to an auto auction in California. Police found that unusual, because Wykel had uncharacteristically not told his closest friends about such plans, yet Wynn knew.

Eventually detectives were able to talk to Wynn themselves. He told them he had not himself seen Wykel since breakfast on February 20. At first, he claimed that the two had never discussed any cars Wykel was interested in purchasing. When police told him that other men at the breakfasts recalled that they had, he said that the deal they had made did not work out.

Wynn became more interesting to police when they investigated his past. They found he had used several aliases and been charged with drug trafficking and violence against women on several occasions. His girlfriend told them that he said he was going to work every day when he left the house, but she knew he never held a job. "He [was] basically a con man," one detective later told Disappeared.

At Wykel's house, police found messages from Wynn amidst those from his friends and family on the answering machine. Wynn's stood out, because they did not show the increasing concern and worry that Wykel's friends expressed when days passed without return calls. One of Wynn's later messages even implied that Wykel had returned a message.

One detective suggested that Wynn take a lie detector test, and he agreed. However, he never came when he said he would, or asked to delay the test. Police found that he was lying about why. In one instance, he claimed to have a dental appointment, but a detective, who watched the dentist's office in question, never saw Wynn enter. Later, the dentist said Wynn was not a patient. They became convinced he was a pathological liar.

A review of Wykel's phone records led to the first break in the case. On February 20, the day before he disappeared, Wykel made two calls to Mother Nature's Acres, a 130-acre (53 ha) RV park with its own woods and trails outside Yelm, in Thurston County, south of Tacoma. Wynn's family owned and operated it.

The King County detectives went there and talked to the employees. One of them, Wynn's sister Robyn, recalled that he had come down on February 23. He was with a man who matched Wykel's description, and drove a black Mercedes similar to Wykel's. They claimed they were just killing some time while they waited for a car the other man was trying to purchase became available. Robyn recalled that the man, who appeared to be Wykel, made a telephone call and seemed increasingly impatient.

Other employees at the RV park corroborated Robyn's account. If it was Wykel, it was the last time he had been seen. Detectives now believed they had proof that Wynn had lied to them again when he claimed he and Wykel had never seriously pursued the purchase of the Thunderbird, and when he claimed to have last seen Wykel three days earlier. Robyn's account also linked him to Wykel's Mercedes during the time it was unaccounted for.

They looked forward to talking to Wynn again and asking him to explain these latest discrepancies in his account. When he was arrested on an outstanding warrant for a traffic violation on April 11, they thought they had their chance. Instead, Wynn invoked his Fifth Amendment right against self-incrimination and refused to tell them anything more until he spoke to a lawyer.

After he was released, he left the Seattle area. Detectives had come to believe Wykel had met with foul play, and designated Wynn a person of interest in the case. Since they had no new leads, the case soon grew cold.

=== The diamond ===
For the next three years the KCSO detectives worked mostly on other cases, but never quite left the Wykel case behind, staying in touch with the family infrequently. Lee said later she felt they had given up on her father. In 1999, one detective, Jon Holland, took over the case and took a more aggressive approach, putting up flyers in the area that made clear the police thought Wykel had come to harm.

He and Susan Peters, a detective who had been part of the original investigation and had kept in touch with Lee, decided to go talk to Robyn Wynn again. She told them two things that interested them. First, she said she had seen her brother within the last two years, at a family reunion in Texas; this was the first time the King County authorities knew his whereabouts since his original departure. Second, he had been showing off a large diamond set in a pendant, something that seemed unusual to her, since he was so often unemployed and could not likely afford such a stone.

Peters and Holland wondered if this could be Wykel's diamond. In 2000, they interviewed the woman Wynn had been living with, four years earlier, but now no longer in a relationship with him. She said that in late February 1996, shortly after Wykel disappeared, Wynn gave her a diamond pendant as a birthday gift.

It was not in a box such as a jeweler might use to package it. She suspected it was not real due to its large size, and had no idea where it might have come from. He told her he'd found it at the Burien park and ride lot, coincidentally the same place Wykel's abandoned Mercedes had been parked. However, he had taken it back from her when the relationship ended and she made him leave her house.

Robyn later told them that her brother sold the diamond pendant to an aunt for $2,000. She helped the King County detectives contact the woman. At first, the aunt said that he had offered it to her for $1,500, claiming to have bought it from a coworker for a thousand dollars more. A jeweler she took it to appraised it at $3–5,000. She claimed at first to have still not bought it and merely let Wynn live with her, but then admitted she had eventually bought it from Wynn for $2,000.

She still had it and they persuaded her to give it to them for examination. A gemologist who examined it told them that it indeed had the unusual European cut it had been described as having by Rebecca Lee. He also found many nicks and scrapes on it, consistent with doing metalwork while wearing it in a ring.

Later, Rebecca went to another jeweler who specialized in recreating lost pieces from detailed descriptions given to him. He made a drawing based on her description of her father's ring. It matched the stone the police got from Wynn's aunt, and thus from Wynn himself, almost exactly—even the stone's diameter was the same.

Holland and Peters called Wynn in Texas and asked about his sister's account that he and Wykel had been seen together two days after Wynn claimed to have last seen the older man. He admitted to going to Thurston County with Wykel, where he said they tried to call the seller. Afterwards, Wynn said, they drove back to Burien, but he could not remember where Wykel dropped him off. The detectives bluffed and told him they had security camera footage showing the car going into the park and ride.

The next interview took place in Texas. This time they told him about the diamond. He confirmed that he found it in the Burien park and ride, the same lot where Wykel's Mercedes had been abandoned. This answer again interested the detectives, as Wynn had never suggested he had been there before. When bluffed again and told him that they found Wykel's DNA on the diamond, Wynn changed his story again, explaining that he had shown it to Wykel immediately after finding it, another detail that he had not shared during the initial investigation.

The detectives felt they had enough circumstantial evidence to charge Wynn with Wykel's murder. They still did not have a body, and prosecutors were uncertain they could convict Wynn without finding Wykel's body. They decided to try to find the body, searching a number of places in and around Thurston County where Wynn could have disposed of a body. They were unsuccessful. In the meantime, Wykel's family had him declared legally dead in 2003, seven years after he had last been seen.

== Arrest ==
The case again stalled, but Holland and Peters kept working it when they could. Without Wykel's body, they knew that prosecutors would have to show a strong motive and detailed sequence of events. They continued to travel to Texas and talk to Wynn whenever they uncovered something. Each time another contradiction in his account was pointed out to him, Wynn changed his story again. "We wrote every single lie down," Peters recalled later, "and we have pages of inconsistencies."

On one of those visits they asked, again, if he would take a lie detector test. He told them that his attorney had advised him not to. When the detectives asked him for the name of his attorney, he asked "Does it matter?"

The break that finally gave the detectives the evidence they needed to arrest Wynn came from Texas. A friend of Wynn, with whom he had apparently discussed the case, told them Wynn said that "nothing's gonna happen. They're not even looking in the right ballpark for the body," suggesting to Holland and Peters that not only did Wynn know there was a body, but where it was. In 2009, authorities in Texas arrested Wynn and extradited him to Washington to stand trial on a charge of first-degree murder.

== Trials ==
Without Wykel's body, prosecutors knew they would have to present a lot more evidence than they might otherwise to support their case that Wynn killed Wykel. They theorized that Wynn had overheard Wykel talking about cars, and seen him showing his cash, at McDonald's one morning, and decided he would make a good mark for another confidence scheme. To support this theory they put on four witnesses who previously had been Wynn's victims in similar schemes. In those cases, Wynn asked a portion of the price for something greatly desired by them, and claimed he was able to help them purchase, but never completed the deals. The lengthy record of his prevarications and evasions to the police supported this claim about his duplicitous tendencies, and linked him to the crime.

Wykel, however, was the first such "mark" to begin to realize that he was being defrauded. To avoid returning the thousand dollars, prosecutors claimed, Wynn played for time by taking Wykel down to Thurston County on the pretext of meeting the seller. Once there, he lured Wykel to an isolated location alone, where he either inadvertently killed Wykel during a confrontation over the money or deliberately killed him, with the added bonus of the cash Wykel had on him and his diamond ring. Under this theory, Wynn's overriding purpose was robbery, a predicate felony justifying the most serious murder charge available under Washington law. The prosecutors dropped the initial charge of premeditation as well.

Wynn went on trial in mid-2010. He continued to profess his innocence. In addition to the missing body and the lack of any evidence suggesting Wykel was dead, Wynn argued that the police had not adequately explored the possibility they originally entertained that the older man might have suddenly decided to visit Argentina. The court declared a mistrial when the jury was unable to reach a unanimous verdict.

A few months later in early 2011, a new jury was impaneled and Wynn was tried again. During the trial, there were allegations of juror misconduct. One alternate juror had "kept bumping into" both prosecutors and defense lawyers, and had at one point been caught looking at state evidence in the elevator. Two others, the bailiff said, had begun deliberating before the case was submitted. Superior Court Judge Susan Craighead dismissed them both and seated two alternates, one of whom was the juror alleged to have attempted to look at the prosecution evidence.

That jury convicted Wynn in April, after a day's deliberations. After the verdict, his lawyers asked for a post-trial hearing on whether the juror misconduct had been prejudicial to the outcome; Craighead ruled that it had not been.

At sentencing, Wynn continued to insist on his innocence. "I'm not going to beg forgiveness for something I did not do," he told Craighead. She sentenced him to 20 years, the minimum for first-degree murder in Washington. As of 2023, Wynn is serving his time at the Washington Corrections Center, located in Shelton.

== Appeal ==
Wynn appealed his conviction to the Washington Court of Appeals, Division I. He did not challenge the murder conviction itself. Instead, he claimed there had been insufficient evidence to suggest the robbery was related to the murder, therefore negating the first-degree murder charge. He argued that the murder was not necessary for him to steal the money since that had happened well in advance, nor was it related to the theft of the ring since under the state's case he had not demonstrated any intent to steal the ring prior to the murder. At most, he argued, the state had proved that he had taken the ring as an "afterthought" to the murder. He also challenged a jury instruction—"The taking constitutes robbery, even if death precedes the taking, whenever the taking and a homicide are part of the same transaction"—that he said reflected this same misunderstanding.

In addition, he raised two procedural issues. First, Judge Craighead had ruled incorrectly at the post-trial hearing on the juror misconduct. Second, his lawyers at trial should have allowed him to take the stand in his own defense, which he claimed they argued about regularly.

In June 2013, a panel of three judges unanimously upheld Wynn's conviction. Judge Mary Kay Becker wrote for herself, Linda Lau and Anna Schindler that a jury could have reasonably concluded from the evidence presented, interpreted in the light most favorable to the state, that Wynn killed Wykel at least in part to keep the money he had already obtained fraudulently. As for the ring and any cash Wykel had, the jury had had the option to convict him merely of theft, since taking property from a deceased person is not by itself robbery.

But the jury had found Wynn committed robbery, by virtue of its conviction on the first-degree felony murder charge. If it did so on the basis of Wynn's actions after killing Wykel, Becker wrote, it could have taken note that he had no legitimate regular employment at that time. It would have been perfectly reasonable for the jury to have concluded that Wynn needed money and killed Wykel for the cash and the diamond ring, and that taking these items after Wykel's death constituted robbery.

Nothing in the record, Becker said, suggested to the panel that there was any abuse of discretion by Craighead in her handling of the juror misconduct issue. Nor did Wynn offer any new insight or evidence that would have afforded an opportunity for further review. As for Wynn's desire to testify on his own behalf, his briefs did not elaborate on what he might have said or how his testimony could have changed the outcome. Nor did he suggest that his attorneys' refusal to do so constituted either ineffective assistance of counsel or misconduct.

== See also ==
- Crime in Washington
- List of Disappeared episodes
- List of murder convictions without a body
- List of solved missing person cases
