= Disappearance of Tammy Kingery =

2014 South Carolina missing-person case

Coordinates: 33.5702°N 81.9787°W

Tamera Russell Kingery
- Born: April 13, 1977
- Disappeared: September 20, 2014 (aged 37); North Augusta, South Carolina
- Status: Missing for 11 years, 10 months and 7 days
- Height: 5 ft 3 in (160 cm)

Locations
1 Last known location

On the morning of September 20, 2014, Tammy Kingery (born April 13, 1977), a nurse in South Carolina, called her husband Park from work and asked him to take her home as she was not feeling well. He did, and afterwards went to run some errands with his two sons. When they returned, the house was locked and Tammy was not there. A note inside the house, apparently left by Tammy, said she was going for a walk and would be back soon, but she never returned and has not been seen since.

Tammy's family said it would have been unusual for her to leave a note, or walk in the woods near their North Augusta home. In the house, she had left her purse, phone, and keys, which would have been needed to lock the door. An extensive search of the area around the house turned up no sign of her.

Investigation by local police revealed that she had been exchanging texts with two men in the area, but police do not believe that is related to her disappearance. She had suffered depression. The case has been the subject of an episode of the Investigation Discovery series Disappeared.

== Background ==
Kingery, a native of Northwest Indiana, met her husband Park Kingery there in the mid-1990s when the two worked together at a local drugstore. On September 20, 1994, the two were engaged. After their marriage, the couple had three children and settled down in a house they built in a wooded area of Edgefield County, South Carolina, just north of North Augusta, near where Park Kingery had gotten a job as a welder. After finishing a degree in nursing in 2001, Tammy took a job as a nurse in a local branch of the NHC Healthcare nursing home. She was still working there in September 2014.

Her marriage to Kingery was strained. While her father, who still lived in Indiana, says he was not aware of any marital or psychological issues his daughter may have had at that time, her mother says the couple had grown distant from each other since their youngest son was born and had considered divorce. Tammy had an ongoing struggle with depression for which she took medication; it had led to extramarital affairs and attempts to take her own life.

During the first weeks of September, Tammy seemed to be suffering physically—according to Park she had missed a few days of work, which was unlike her. She often went to bed shortly after returning from work. Park says Tammy believed no treatment would work. Around September 16, Tammy began having trouble sleeping. One night she woke up sweating so severely she had to change her clothes. She confided this to her two sisters, with whom she spoke regularly. They advised her to make an appointment to see the doctor, which she did, for September 21.

== Disappearance ==
On the morning of September 20, 2014, Tammy went to work her shift starting at 7 a.m. Her coworkers there say she was agitated about something, uncharacteristically raising her voice in conversation, and checked her own blood pressure four times, finding it high. They urged her to calm down as her agitation was keeping her heart rate high.

Not too long after arriving, she called Park to say she was feeling a little lightheaded and wanted to come home. Since she did not feel up to driving, he picked her up at 8:30, leaving her car at work, and brought her home, where she changed into her pajamas and lay down to take a nap. Around 10, he left with the couple's two sons to do some errands and give his wife the chance to rest. Their daughter was still at the house of a friend with whom she had spent the preceding night.

Tammy's note

Park dropped the older son off at his mother's house so the boy could mow the lawn. He took the younger boy with him on his errands, visiting several stores where the two were seen by security cameras. When he returned to the house between 10:15 and 10:30, the dog was outside and the door was locked. Inside they found a note from Tammy reading: "Went for a walk. Be back soon. Love you." Tammy was initially reported to have taken a Hard Rock Café backpack with her, but that was later corrected as the backpack had been sold a week before at a yard sale. Her purse, wallet, cell phone, and keys were still inside the house.

When he saw the note, Kingery believed right away that something was wrong, as it was not like her to go for walks in hot weather (the local temperature was 98 °F (37 °C) at the time). His first thought was that she had attempted to walk back to her job in order to retrieve her car. He left his sons at home and drove the route she would have taken but did not find her. He called his daughter and told her to get into a car with her friend and look for her mother; he called his mother-in-law, who came to the house right away. At the home he and his son called and searched for Tammy in the thick surrounding woods. At 2 p.m. they called the police.

== Searches and investigation ==
Deputies from the Edgefield County Sheriff's Office responded. They, too, attempted to locate Tammy nearby but could not. Then they searched the house for any signs that a crime might have been committed; there was nothing unusual. Search dogs were given the nursing scrubs Tammy had worn to her job that morning but did not find a trail anywhere. A local police dog handler said in 2023 that while heat can make searches for human bodies challenging, it would also have made it easier for dogs to smell a decomposing body from some distance away.

The search was quickly expanded to use a South Carolina Law Enforcement Division helicopter and more deputies fanned out over a larger area around the Kingery house. They also searched a hiking trail near Interstate 20 where Tammy had often gone in the past. A notice put out for her drew reports of sightings in the Central Savannah River Area of South Carolina and Georgia around North Augusta, one of a white female walking along the interstate in Columbia County, Georgia, 30 miles (48 km) to the west. But by nighttime, neither Tammy nor any clues to her whereabouts had been found.

Park, who had personally traveled as far as Atlanta looking for his wife, organized a volunteer search for her a week after her disappearance, but again the woods within 10 miles (16 km) of the house yielded nothing. Family and friends produced fliers and distributed them around the area, relying on truck drivers they knew to carry them further away. They also set up a Facebook page.

Deep in the woods near the house, the volunteer searchers caught the scent of something that they thought was a corpse. They followed it to an abandoned wooden shack, in an area thick with briars. Inside they found sponges, gloves, and a plastic bag containing a dead dog, the source of the stench. While many of them believe the shed may have some connection to Tammy's disappearance, the sheriff's office had checked it on their original search and contend that it does not.

However, some of the volunteers were not so easily convinced. "Someone went to a lot of trouble to put that dead dog there," said one family friend. Even if it did have nothing to do with Tammy's disappearance, he said, it showed that there were potentially dangerous people in the vicinity of the Kingerys' house. Further attempts to search in the woods were curtailed when South Carolina's deer season began shortly afterward, making the woods unsafe.

Initially, police had kept details of Tammy's depression out of their public statements on the case. They believed that merely describing her as "endangered" without saying why might help them filter out genuine tips from hoax calls and mistaken identity. But by late September, Park had made that information public, apparently hoping that people would recognize the urgency of her condition and find her.

Police looked at Tammy's phone to see if anything there might help establish what she did or intended to do that day. They found two sets of text messages with other men, which they described as "romantic" in nature, that Tammy had apparently deleted prior to her disappearance. However, they investigated the two men and do not believe they had any involvement in her disappearance.

Tammy shared her husband's family's enthusiasm for motorcycles, and two tips investigators received suggest one might have been involved in her disappearance. Her daughter claims to have seen her mother as the passenger on a motorcycle that passed the car she was in with her friend while they were near the family home (but were unable to locate when they turned around; later attempts by police to find it or evidence of its presence anywhere were likewise unsuccessful). A neighbor also recalls hearing a vehicle with a loud engine, possibly a motorcycle, leave the Kingerys' driveway shortly after Kingery left with his sons after seeing his wife for what has turned out to be the last time.

In 2016 the arrest of serial killer Todd Kohlhepp raised hopes that Kingery might have been found with his victims, but none of the bodies buried on his property matched her DNA. In 2021 the Kingerys' daughter Caitlyn started receiving messages on Facebook from a "Chris Slade" who offered to share information about the case with her in exchange for sexual favors, claimed to have known her in high school and made statements suggesting some knowledge of her family, like what kind of car her father drove. She continued to communicate with him, until "Slade" began attempting to blackmail her.

At that point Caitlyn compiled all the texts, found an Instagram account with the same username whose profile mentioned having "combat training" and took them to the police, but never heard from them about those messages. In 2023 the Edgefield County deputy sheriff investigating Tammy's disappearance said he had never received any documentation of those communications when he took over the case and would look into them.

=== Questions ===
The circumstances of Tammy's disappearance proved particularly puzzling to her family and friends. It was very much unlike her, they told reporters, to go for walks in the woods around the house; even on the roads, as the Kingerys' neighborhood of houses on large lots was not pedestrian-friendly, and when she did do something like that she usually drove to town where better areas for walking existed. They also found it unusual that she left a note, as she almost always kept in touch with her family, friends, and coworkers via text messages. The note's concluding "Love you" also seemed to them more like something someone might say if they were expecting to be away for weeks rather than hours. It was speculated that it might not have been written by her, but several months after her disappearance the State Law Enforcement Division confirmed that it was.

Another question centered on the house being locked when Kingery and his son returned. The house's main door could be locked only from the outside, with the key. Yet Tammy's keys, including the house key, were inside along with her purse, wallet, and phone, items she might have been expected to take if she were planning a longer absence.

== Theories and aftermath ==
A few weeks after Tammy's disappearance, police officially stated that they believed there were "suspicious circumstances" in the case. Her family likewise believes that something unpleasant befell her. The question they and police have is what that was.

"Unfortunately she developed a depression, and I think that's what led to her leaving", Kingery said to local TV station WRDW-TV a year afterward. He said Tammy would sometimes tell him she "needed to get away". According to one account she had attempted suicide two weeks before her disappearance, and it has been suggested that the disappearance was another suicide attempt that would have left her body undiscoverable.

Alternatively, given the possibility that someone else may have been involved, Tammy may have been abducted or killed. "I've always thought maybe someone just got in the house and took her", Kingery said, recalling how many of her personal items were left behind. The family has asked police to search bodies of water in the area they may have bypassed before. The chief investigator on the case for the sheriff's department said in 2016 that a body would have floated to the surface by then.

After the initial searches, police decided to thoroughly investigate Park Kingery again. His account of his actions and whereabouts on the morning Tammy disappeared was corroborated both by independent interviews with his sons, cell phone pings and security camera footage from the stores he and the younger son had visited. He also took a lie detector test, which he told Tammy's mother made him nervous. After initially telling the Curious Times podcast almost a year after Tammy's disappearance that the police told him some of the results were "questionable", he told the Investigation Discovery channel's Disappeared series in 2016 that police had asked him not to talk about it.

Unlike other missing persons cases, there is currently no reward available for information leading to the resolution of the case. Kingery says he had to spend the $4,000 he put up to pay bills with his wife's income, the greater in the household, gone. "I wish I could have put out more but it's gone; that was my money out of my retirement fund". With the house and all the vehicles in his wife's name, Park encountered financial difficulty and had to file for bankruptcy. "There was nothing I could do" he recalled later. "I ended up living in my parents' basement at almost 50 years old."

== See also ==
- List of people who disappeared mysteriously (2000–present)
