= Disappearance of Macin Smith =

2015 disappearance in St. George, Utah

Macin Smith
- Born: Macin Darrin Smith; April 7, 1998; American Fork, Utah, U.S.
- Disappeared: September 1, 2015 (aged 17); St. George, Utah, U.S.
- Status: Missing for 11 years, 2 months and 8 days
- Height: 6 ft 4 in (193 cm)

On September 1, 2015, Macin Darrin Smith, a 17‑year‑old teen from St. George, Utah, disappeared from his home. That morning, his parents heard him moving around and assumed he had left for school, but he never boarded the bus and did not attend classes. Despite extensive search efforts and national media coverage, no confirmed sightings have ever been reported, and his whereabouts remain unknown. His case was later featured on the television series Disappeared.

== Background ==
Macin Darrin Smith was born on April 7, 1998, in American Fork, Utah, the youngest of six children to Darrin and Tracey. He was diagnosed with childhood aphasia, a neurological speech disorder that affected his ability to communicate. Although the condition had improved significantly by adolescence, the impediment remained slightly noticeable, with his mother describing it as sounding like "someone who is hard of hearing".

According to his maternal uncle, Smith had suffered from depression and had previously attempted suicide at 15, which led to a hospitalization.

In December 2013, while living in Alberta, Canada, Smith attempted to run away following a disciplinary incident in which his father had taken away his video game system. Around 10 p.m., Smith left the house carrying a sleeping bag, food, and printed résumés, reportedly intending to prove he could support himself. He returned home voluntarily around midnight.

Smith moved to St. George, Utah, with his mother in April 2015. His father was working outside the area at the time and joined them later.

== Disappearance ==
On August 31, 2015, Smith texted his mother a screenshot of his school grades, showing A's and B's. They had an agreement that if he maintained good grades and completed all his assignments, he would be allowed to watch anime. She replied that his father would be taking him for driving lessons first. Smith told his father he had a headache, so the lesson was rescheduled for the following day.

Later that day, at approximately 8:30 p.m., Tracey went to Smith's bedroom and found him in bed with the lights off. When she asked what was going on, he said he wasn't feeling very well. Later that evening, Tracey unplugged the home's internet router so that he wouldn't be up all night watching anime or playing video games.

At 1:30 a.m. on September 1, Darrin noticed light under Smith's bedroom door and entered to find that he had plugged the router back in and was watching anime. Darrin confiscated his laptop and phone, enforcing their agreed curfew. At 7 a.m., Darrin woke Smith for school. He knocked on his bedroom door and asked if he was up, and Smith replied, "Yep." Darrin then returned to bed. Half an hour later, both parents heard him moving around in the kitchen. At 7:40 a.m., they heard the garage door close and assumed he had left to catch the school bus.

When the bus returned at 3:15 p.m., Smith was not on it. Darrin began searching for him but had no way to contact him due to the confiscated devices. Tracey received a text from Darrin reporting Smith's absence and was notified by Desert Hills High School that he had not attended classes. Initially, the family believed he was avoiding conflict. Upon returning home, Tracey discovered that Smith's bedroom door was locked.

By 10 p.m., with Smith still missing and past curfew, his parents contacted the St. George Police Department and filed a missing persons report.

== Aftermath and potential sightings ==
On September 2, Tracey went to Desert Hills High School to pay for Smith's graduation cap and gown and continued searching for him on campus, but he was not present. Back at home, she discovered Smith's wallet in his nightstand, containing cash and identification cards. His cell phone and laptop were also left behind. Throughout the day, Tracey and Darrin contacted friends, neighbors, and community members.

On September 7, Tracey discovered a handwritten note tucked inside Smith's wallet. While only part of the note was later made public, it reportedly expressed emotional distress and internal conflict. Two words stood out to her: "I’m done." That same day, a neighbor contacted the family to report having seen Smith walking away from the neighborhood on the morning of his disappearance.

In the weeks after Smith vanished, the family received numerous tips from the public. One particularly detailed report described a young man resembling him standing near a freeway exit close to his high school, holding a sign requesting a ride to Las Vegas. Several relatives traveled to Nevada to investigate, working alongside Red Rock Search and Rescue, but the lead ultimately proved inconclusive. Meanwhile, back in St. George, more than 200 volunteers joined a community-led search near the family home, although the effort did not uncover any definitive clues.

In 2016, two sisters reported encountering a young man at a Panda Express in West Valley City, Utah, who closely resembled Smith. The man, who had a slight speech impediment, asked them for money to catch a bus. After learning about Smith's case, the women listened to a voicemail recording of his voice and believed it matched the man they had met. His mother later described this as "the most credible" sighting the family had received. However, security cameras at the restaurant were not operational at the time, and the sighting could not be confirmed.

In January 2017, a series of unconfirmed sightings of Smith were reported in northern California. One report came from Modesto, where volunteers conducting a homeless count described a possible multi-person sighting of someone resembling him. Earlier that month, several reports from the Sacramento area also prompted police investigation. Over time, however, the frequency of such reports declined, and no confirmed sightings emerged.

Smith's parents divorced in May 2018.

In January 2019, a memorial bench honoring Smith was donated to his family and placed at Crimson Ridge Park in St. George, Utah.

=== Media coverage ===
Smith's disappearance was featured on the television series Disappeared.

== See also ==
- List of people who disappeared mysteriously (2000–present)
