= Murder of Bethany Decker =

American woman who went missing in 2011

Coordinates: 38.9934°N 77.4851°W

Bethany Decker
- Image of Decker distributed at the time of her disappearance in 2011
- Born: Bethany Anne Littlejohn; May 13, 1989; Fredericksburg, Virginia, U.S.
- Disappeared: January 29, 2011 (aged 21); Ashburn, Virginia, U.S.
- Status: Closed with guilty plea to murder
- Citizenship: American
- Occupation: Waitress
- Known for: Disappearance (while five months pregnant)
- Height: 4 ft 11 in (150 cm)
- Spouse: Emile Decker
- Children: 1

On January 29, 2011, Bethany Anne Decker (née Littlejohn; born May 13, 1989) left her grandparents' home and returned to her apartment in Ashburn, Virginia. Her co-worker/roommate, Ronald Roldan, claimed he saw her there later that day. She has not been seen since.

While Decker did not show up at her job or classes she took at nearby George Mason University, her absence was not noted for another three weeks as messages to her friends, purportedly from her, continued to be posted on her Facebook account. After her family noted her physical absence, they found her car parked near her apartment. Apart from the Facebook posts, there had been no other evidence she had done anything since the day she was last seen. They reported her missing to Loudoun County Sheriff's Office. Decker was five months pregnant at the time of her disappearance. Extensive searches have found no trace of her or the child she might have given birth to.

Roldan, a Bolivian national with a criminal record, was arrested in North Carolina in 2015 and charged with the attempted murder of another girlfriend after he shot her during an incident in 2014; he has not said anything about the Decker case. After she recovered, the victim claimed on the Dr. Phil show that he had made statements to her that might implicate him in Decker's disappearance. Roldan pleaded guilty to two lesser charges in 2016; after he served his sentence, he was expected to be deported. Instead, he was charged with Decker's abduction upon his release in 2020 and returned to Loudoun County. On November 17, 2022, he pleaded guilty to second degree murder in relation to her disappearance. On February 21, 2023, he was sentenced to 12.5 years in prison, plus 27.5 years suspended.

== Background ==
A native of Fredericksburg, Virginia, Bethany Decker attended George Mason University (GMU) in Fairfax after graduating high school. She majored in global and economic change while working full-time. During her time at GMU, she became pregnant by Emile Decker, an Army National Guardsman. The two married in 2009; their son was born six months later. Emile was often deployed to Afghanistan with his unit for months at a time. During those times, Decker often left the boy with her in-laws in Columbia, Maryland, while she worked and attended classes.

While working at an Italian restaurant in Centreville, Virginia, Decker met Roldan, a Bolivian immigrant, then around 30 years old, and began an extramarital affair with him. By late 2010, there were strains in the Deckers' marriage; Bethany moved to a separate apartment in Ashburn, Virginia. The relationship with Roldan soon followed, and he moved in with her. According to her family, Decker quickly found that Roldan was abusive, possessive, and controlling. Several times a day, he demanded that she send him a picture of herself from her cellphone to show who she was with. Her parents began developing a plan to get her out of the relationship. By the end of the year, she was pregnant.

== Disappearance ==
In January 2011, Emile came back from his deployment for a month-long leave. Near the end of that period, he and Bethany went on a vacation to Hawaii for a week. They returned on January 28 and spent the night at her grandparents' home in Maryland. Emile's parents were unaware of the couple's marital difficulties.

The next morning, Emile saw Decker before she went back to the Ashburn apartment. Roldan said he saw her there later that afternoon. Since then, no one else is known to have seen her. During that day, Decker called her employer to confirm her work schedule for the coming week, the last known contact she has had with anyone other than Emile or Roldan.

On February 2, Emile's leave ended and he returned to Afghanistan. Friends who came to see him off at the airport noted that unlike previous such occasions, Decker was not there. They attributed her absence to the couple's marital problems.

== Investigation ==
Friends and family say Decker did her best to keep in contact with them. But due to her busy life, balancing her classes in what was to be her final semester at GMU with a full-time job, they had gotten used to not hearing from her for several days at a time, so they were not worried as February 2011 began without any news from her. However, later in the month, several of Decker's friends called her mother, Kim Nelson, saying that they had received messages from her via her Facebook account that did not seem to them to have come from Decker.

By February 19, not having heard from her daughter herself, Nelson asked her parents, who lived near Ashburn, to drive by and see if she was there. Decker's Hyundai was still out front, but it was parked at an unusual angle, with one tire flat, and noticeably dusty. This was not the condition it had been in one week earlier, when the grandparents had last driven by. No one answered when they knocked on the door. Decker's grandparents called Loudoun County Sheriff's Office and reported her missing.

Investigators found that Decker had not used her bank accounts or cell phone since the last day she was seen, nor had she reported to work or attended her classes. They initially focused on Emile and Roldan, since both of them might have had a motive to harm Decker due to the love triangle they were involved in. With the help of the Army's Criminal Investigation Command (CID), they were able to reach Emile at his remote post in Afghanistan and talk to him on the phone. Later they were able to have him return to the U.S., where he spoke with law enforcement at length and took a polygraph test.

Roldan had moved out of the apartment shortly after Decker's disappearance, since the lease had expired, and gone to live with his mother in Centreville. He told law enforcement that he had just assumed that she had gone back to live with her family when she failed to return. But investigators became more interested in him when they learned that he had a prior criminal record, including one arrest for identity theft and later convictions for public intoxication and destruction of property after a 2006 incident where he smashed a woman's car window. He also reportedly gave them inconsistent answers to questions about when he had seen the Hyundai parked outside the apartment.

In March, law enforcement searched a field near the apartment complex. They obtained a search warrant for Roldan's current residence, specifying murder as the possible criminal offense on the affidavits. Among the items seized for forensic examination were several cell phones, a laptop computer and some documents.

However, law enforcement were not able to develop any evidence from this material that might have helped them locate Decker. Roldan later stopped cooperating with the investigation; he has subsequently been described by law enforcement as a person of interest. Emile later obtained a divorce from his missing wife. It has since been reported that he will no longer talk with investigators unless his lawyer, who says his client has nothing to hide, is also present. No record was ever found suggesting that Decker had given birth by her expected due date later that summer, although the Loudoun County Sheriff's Office distributed to the public pictures of what she might look like near the end of a pregnancy.

"We feel we have probably interviewed folks in this investigation already that probably have information that we would like to have and have been reluctant to hand that information over yet," Sheriff Steve Simpson told a local newspaper later in 2011. "So, we're hopeful that as the days go by that they'll realize that if they have information, no matter how insignificant they think it is, they will give it to us."

A year later, Roldan made his only public statements on the case, through his attorney. "My client remains hopeful and prays daily that Bethany will come home," said Andi Geloo on his behalf. She said he had cooperated with investigators. "He has complete confidence they're working hard on the case."

In late 2012, the Investigation Discovery channel series Disappeared visited the area to produce a segment on the case. Producers interviewed Decker's friends and family, newspaper reporters who had covered the story, and law enforcement. One of the journalists interviewed speculated that the show was interested in the case because Decker was pregnant at the time of her disappearance, and involved in a love triangle, "so there are a couple of ways this could go." The episode aired at the end of November.

On the third anniversary of Bethany's disappearance, Nelson challenged Roldan to take a polygraph test. "I would like to hear what happened," she told Washington-area news radio station WTOP-FM. "I'd like him to join the polygraph list like the rest of us did. If you have nothing to hide, you have nothing to worry about." In response, Geloo repeated that Roldan had answered all questions he was asked during the original investigation and was innocent of any crime that may have been committed.

== 2014: Roldan's North Carolina arrest and trial ==
Ronald Roldan remained in northern Virginia for several years after Decker's disappearance. In 2014 he began another relationship with Vickey Willoughby, a woman he met in a Manassas restaurant. She said that Roldan later grew controlling, and that she attempted to flee the relationship by moving to Pinehurst, North Carolina, a few months later, but Roldan found out and followed her there.

Their relationship turned violent. While being physically assaulted by Roldan, Willoughby pulled out a handgun she had hidden in the living room to protect herself. She was able to shoot Roldan twice, although he continued to struggle, and eventually gained control of the gun himself, shooting Willoughby three times, once in the head.

Both survived, although Willoughby lost one of her eyes to the head wound. She was not charged since investigators believed she had been acting in self-defense; he was charged with assault with a deadly weapon, assault on a female and discharging a firearm in an occupied dwelling. After being released from the hospital, he was taken to Moore County jail and held on $1 million bail.

Detectives from Loudoun County visited Roldan in jail to ask if he was now interested in speaking with them about Bethany's disappearance again; he referred them to his attorney. In April 2015, he was additionally charged with attempted murder over the incident with Willoughby. His attorney said he intended to plead not guilty to the charges. Shortly afterwards, Willoughby appeared on an episode of Dr. Phil devoted to the Decker case, and she said that Roldan had told her, during their fight the previous November, he could "make people disappear."

In May 2016, after some of the evidence in the case had been suppressed, Roldan accepted a plea bargain from prosecutors. He pled guilty to two felony assault charges and was sentenced to six to eight years in prison. Immigration and Customs Enforcement planned to begin deportation proceedings against him once his sentence was completed.

== Criminal charge and guilty plea ==
On November 9, 2020, the Loudoun County Sheriff's Office obtained a warrant for Roldan's arrest for the abduction of Decker. LCSO returned him to Loudoun County from North Carolina upon the completion of his sentence there. As of November 10, 2020, Roldan remained held at the Loudoun County Adult Detention Center on no bond.

On November 17, 2022, Roldan pled guilty to second-degree murder in relation to Decker's disappearance. Her body remains undiscovered.

On February 21, 2023, Roldan was sentenced to 40 years in prison, the maximum permitted for second-degree murder, with all but 12 1/2 years of his sentence suspended. He could serve the full sentence if he commits another crime or violates other conditions, including to have no contact with members of Decker's family, during a 25-year suspension period. As part of a plea deal with prosecutors, Roldan agreed to go on the record with his account of the murder. He claims they got into an argument in their Ashburn apartment, and he pushed her. She fell and hit her head on a windowsill. He claims he checked for signs of life, but she was dead. He says he got scared, panicked and never called 911.

He says he put her body into a Christmas tree disposal bag and dumped her in the trash compactor at their complex.

== In popular culture ==
The incident was the subject of a 2012 segment of the Investigation Discovery series Disappeared.

== See also ==
- Crime in Virginia
- List of murder convictions without a body
- List of solved missing person cases (post-2000)
