= Disappearance of Logan Schiendelman =

Unsolved 2016 disappearance of 19 year-old man from Washington

Logan Schiendelman
- Schiendelman c. 2015
- Born: Logan Drew Schiendelman; June 27, 1996; Olympia, Washington, U.S.
- Disappeared: May 19, 2016 (aged 19); Rochester, Washington, U.S. 46.851329°N 122.978052°W
- Status: Missing for 10 years, 3 months and 13 days
- Education: Washington State University
- Height: 6 ft 0 in (1.83 m)
- Mother: Hannah Schiendelman

On May 19, 2016, Logan Drew Schiendelman, a 19‑year‑old man, disappeared under mysterious circumstances in Thurston County, Washington. The son of a mixed‑race mother and a Saudi Arabian father, Schiendelman was raised primarily by his grandmother in Tumwater, where he was a standout athlete at Tumwater High School. After attending Washington State University for one year, he dropped out and returned to Tumwater, working several jobs while living with his grandmother and half‑sister. He was last seen by his grandmother on the morning of May 19, when the two spoke in their kitchen before leaving for work.

On May 20, his Chrysler Sebring was found abandoned along the southbound lanes of Interstate 5 in Rochester, (Note: Several database entries for Schiendelman (such as at the National Missing and Unidentified Persons System) list the location he went missing from as Tumwater, where he resided. However, the Disappeared episode on Schiendelman's disappearance as well as contemporaneous news reports place the last sightings of him near his car along Interstate 5 at milepost 92; this milepost is located within the zip code of Rochester, per Google Maps. This is also where his vehicle was abandoned.) approximately 20 miles south of Tumwater, with his wallet, driver's license, and cell phone still inside. Around 2:00 p.m., a witness reported seeing the vehicle swerving across multiple lanes before crashing into the median; the witness stated that a tall white man exited the passenger side and ran into the nearby woods. A six‑hour search with tracking and cadaver dogs found no trace of Schiendelman. Another witness later reported seeing a man resembling him standing beside the parked car earlier that morning, accompanied by two white men. A sketch was produced of one of the unidentified men, but his identity remains unknown.

As of 2026, Schiendelman's whereabouts remain unknown. His disappearance was profiled in 2018 on the Investigation Discovery series Disappeared and in 2023 on Dateline NBC's podcast Missing in America.

== Background ==
Logan Drew Schiendelman was born June 27, 1996, and raised in Tumwater, Washington, by his maternal grandmother, Virginia (Ginny) Gebo. He was a multiracial (African-American, Caucasian, Saudi Arabian) male. His father is a Saudi Arabian native and was not present in Schiendelman's life. His mother is biracial, African-American with Louisiana roots, and Caucasian.

Logan’s mother, Hannah, never had a relationship with Logan’s father and moved to Seattle at the age of 23 to attend art school after his birth. When his mother moved, Logan and his older half-sister, Chloe, became legal dependents of his grandmother, Ginny Gebo. Logan's father is a Saudi native who conceived Schiendelman with his mother, Hannah, in the Pacific Northwest According to Gebo, Schiendelman's father left the United States before his birth, and the two never had a relationship.

Schiendelman attended Tumwater High School, where he had been a star defensive back on the school's football team and a model student. Schiendelman's mother, Hannah, lived nearby in Olympia throughout most of his life. As Schiendelman became a teenager, his grandmother stated that he experienced an "identity crisis" due to being mixed-race; Schiendelman's mother was half-white and half-black, while his father was Saudi, and he had been primarily raised by his white grandmother.

After graduating high school in 2015, Schiendelman enrolled at Washington State University, approximately 300 miles (480 km) away in Pullman. He completed one year of his studies before deciding to return to Tumwater and dropped out of college. After Schiendelman left college, he moved back in with his grandmother Gebo and half-sister Chloe. Gebo stated she was aware he had been smoking marijuana at the time, which she worried was causing him to suffer from slight paranoia. "He was kind of at a loss with what he was going to do with his life," she recalled. In Tumwater, Schiendelman worked several odd jobs, which included at a laundering facility and laboring on his great-aunt's 5-acre (2.0 ha) farm.

== Disappearance ==
Locations, Thurston, Washington
1 Last known location.

On the morning of May 19, 2016, Schiendelman spoke with his grandmother, Gebo, while the two prepared for their respective jobs; Gebo recalled of their conversation: "He was just really nervous, which he isn’t usually, kind of on a mission." She also stated he had claimed to have had an "epiphany." Gebo told Schiendelman that they could continue their conversation later that evening before departing for her job at the Washington State Department of Ecology. After Schiendelman failed to arrive home, Gebo tracked his cell phone, and saw it had pinged near Olympia; this led her to assume he was visiting his mother there.

By the following day, May 20, Schiendelman failed to return home, and Gebo attempted to report him missing, but found the Thurston County Police Department closed for the weekend. On Monday, May 23, she filed a missing persons report; upon doing so, she was notified that Schiendelman's car, a black 1996 Chrysler Sebring, had been impounded on May 20. The vehicle had been found parked at milepost 92 alongside southbound Interstate 5 between Tumwater and Maytown. His personal items including his wallet, several bags of food, and cell phone were all found in his car, which had been directly turned over to Gebo from the impound lot. Inside Schiendelman's wallet was his debit card, driver's license, and $25 in cash.

== Investigation ==
=== Witness sightings ===
Sketch of possible suspect

A police sketch was completed by Thurston County Police of one man seen standing with Schiendelman near his car on Interstate 5 the day he disappeared.

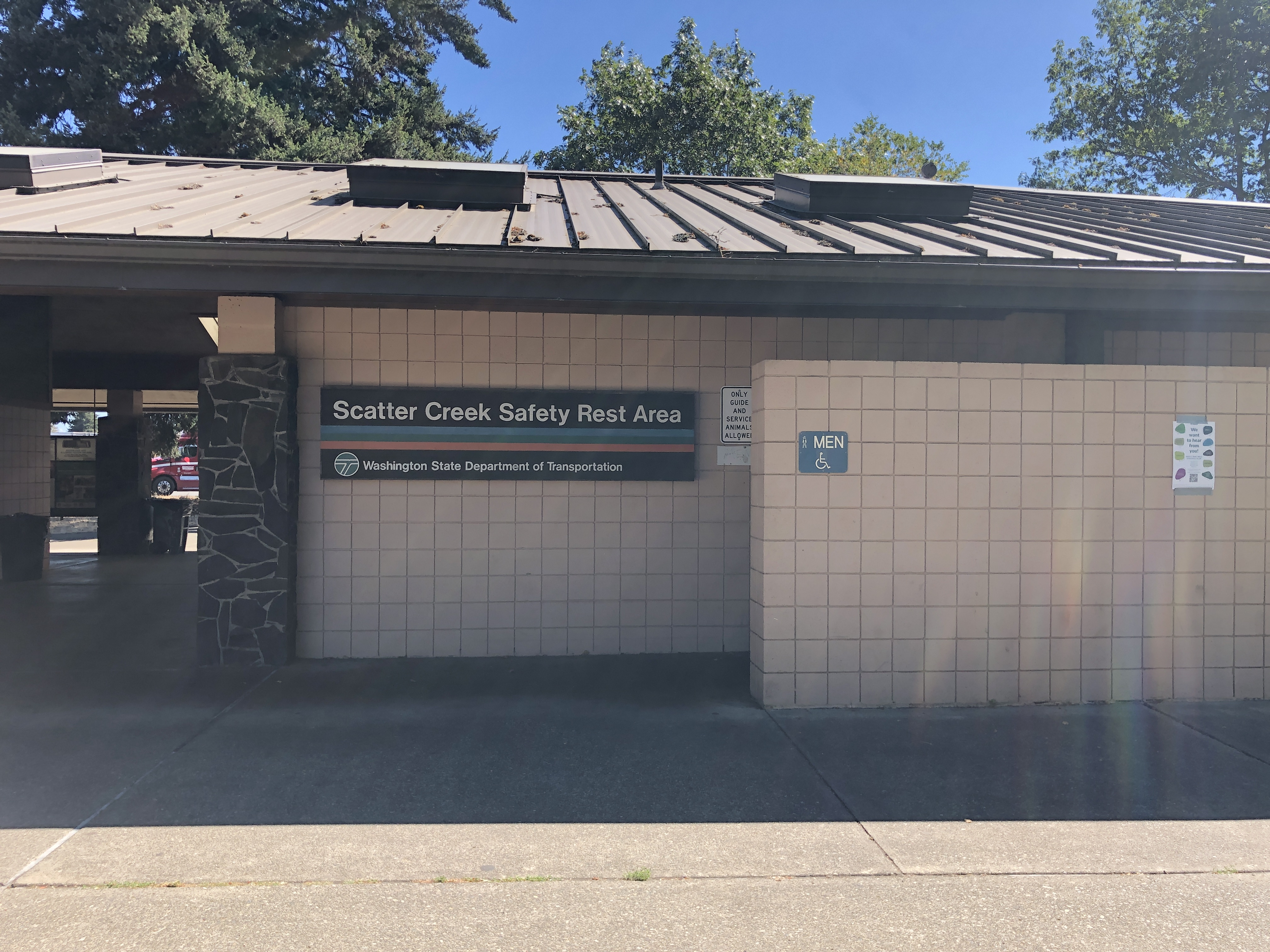
I5 rest stop near where the car was found abandoned, Thurston county

Shortly after Schiendelman's disappearance, several witnesses came forward to Thurston County Police stating they had witnessed Schiendelman's vehicle on Interstate 5 the morning of May 20: A woman driving on the interstate that morning reported seeing Schiendelman with two Caucasian men standing at the back of his car, which was parked on the right shoulder of the interstate near Exit 95. She recalled seeing the car in the same location when returning home that evening, but this time with the hood lifted, and no one visibly present. She described one of the men as being around 6 feet 0 inches (1.83 m) tall with a thin build, blond hair in a bowl cut, and wearing a tank top and jean shorts that were too small for him. The other man was described as having shoulder-length blond hair, and wearing a flannel shirt with jeans. On June 30, 2017, law enforcement released a police sketch of the former man.

Around 2:00 p.m. on May 20, three individuals called 9-1-1 to report a car matching Schiendelman's drifting across the lanes of Interstate 5 between Tumwater and Maytown, near the milepost where Schiendelman's car had been discovered. The witnesses reported that the car veered across three lanes toward the center divider, hitting the concrete barrier and stopping. No one appeared to be driving the car. A truck driver passing by reported seeing a Caucasian man with brown or red hair jumping out of the vehicle's passenger side and running into the woods on the side of the interstate.

Later in the evening of May 20, there was a potential sighting of a naked teenager in the area, though the identity of the individual is unknown; Thurston County Detective Frank Frawley stated: "We thought that might have been Logan... And so they did initiate a search using dogs. They didn't locate anything. Could've been Logan, could've been anybody." The last clothing Schiendelman was known to be wearing included a black windbreaker, a white shirt, jeans, and possibly a pair of Nike tennis shoes.

=== Initial investigation ===
I have no reason to believe he's been killed. I have no reason to believe he's alive.

— Detective Frank Frawley on the confounding nature of Schiendelman's disappearance

Schiendelman's uncle, Mike Ware, a retired Thurston County sheriff, assisted in organizing search efforts for his nephew. Searches focused on a 2-mile (3.2 km) radius surrounding the interstate where Schiendelman's car had been discovered, specifically the woods adjacent to the shoulder of the interstate. Searches were done both on foot and by aircraft, but no sign of Schiendelman was found. In June 2016, Ware told NBC News: "The area is extremely thick and brushy. I’ve spent hours out there searching myself. Canines were brought in to search and it’s been covered extensively. But nothing has been found." The Schiendelman family subsequently hired a private investigator to research his disappearance, but noted that "little information" was available, making search efforts difficult. Because Schiendelman's vehicle had been impounded and had not been processed by a crime lab, any potential evidence inside was rendered unusable.

Using cell phone records, law enforcement were able to track Schiendelman's movements on the morning of May 20, which showed he had traveled towards Interstate 5 heading south; he then turned around and headed north before reversing direction again, heading south on Interstate 5 and eventually stopping where his vehicle was recovered.

Early in the investigation, law enforcement questioned the boyfriend of Schiendelman's half-sister, who had recently moved into their household. Tension between Schiendelman and her boyfriend prompted detectives to question him, though he was ruled out as having any involvement in Schiendelman's disappearance after passing a polygraph examination.

== Publicity ==
Following Schiendelman's disappearance, his family launched a large internet campaign asking the community for information in his disappearance. A Facebook page was established, which had grown to over 6,500 members by June 2016. Local volunteers helped raise $10,000 in reward funds by selling bracelets bearing his name at Tumwater High School. Among these fundraisers was a large garage sale of donated items, held in Olympia in August 2016.

Schiendelman's disappearance was profiled on the Investigation Discovery docu-series Disappeared on April 8, 2018. Schiendelman’s disappearance is also the subject of season 2 of the Hide and Seek podcast. The case was also covered on the June 20, 2023 episode of Dateline: NBC's series Missing in America.

== See also ==
- List of people who disappeared mysteriously: post-1970

== Works cited ==
- "Last Words". Disappeared. Season 9. Episode 2. Investigation Discovery. April 8, 2018.
