= Jamison family deaths =

2009 disappearance of an Oklahoma family

Jamison family
- Born: Bobby Jamison: August 4, 1965 (aged 44) Sherilynn Jamison: November 5, 1968 (aged 40) Madyson Jamison: August 1, 2003 (aged 6)
- Disappeared: October 8, 2009; Red Oak, Oklahoma U.S.
- Status: Found deceased
- Known for: Mysterious Disappearance

The Jamison family of Eufaula, Oklahoma, United States – Bobby Jamison, his wife Sherilynn, and daughter Madyson – mysteriously disappeared on or after October 8, 2009. The family was reportedly considering the purchase of a 40-acre (16 ha) plot of land near Red Oak, about 30 mi (48 km) from Eufaula, at the time that they vanished. Their suspected remains were found in November 2013 and positively identified by the Oklahoma medical examiner on July 3, 2014. No cause of death was determined, and the circumstances surrounding their disappearance remain unknown.

== Disappearance ==
The initial investigation into the Jamison family's disappearance indicated that they had probably not vanished of their own accord. Their pickup truck was found abandoned in Latimer County, Oklahoma, a short distance south of Kinta, a few days after their disappearance. The Jamisons' bodies were not found, but their malnourished dog, Maisie, was still in the truck. Also discovered were the family's ID cards, wallets, mobile phones, a GPS system and about US$32,000 in cash. The Jamisons were not known for carrying large amounts of cash with them.

Footage from the family's home surveillance system, time stamped the day they left their house, showed the couple making several silent trips between their vehicle and home as they methodically packed to leave. In the footage, the couple's movements were described as "trancelike." The video also shows Sherilynn place a brown briefcase in the vehicle. Former Sheriff Beauchamp remarked that he believed the briefcase could be an important clue; neither the briefcase nor Sherilynn's handgun has ever been recovered.

== Discovery ==
The skeletal remains of two adults and one child were discovered by two hunters in a remote area of Latimer County in November 2013, more than four years after the family went missing, and less than 3 mi (4.8 km) away from where the pickup truck had been abandoned. The remains were widely presumed to be those of the missing family, though the Oklahoma medical examiner's office had to use anthropological and forensic pathological testing to identify them. Officials confirmed on July 3, 2014, that the remains belonged to the Jamisons. A cause of death was not determined due to the heavily decomposed state of the bodies.

== Theories ==
Before the remains were discovered, several theories emerged about the family's disappearance, such as that they had faked their own deaths, were in witness protection, were murdered or had died by group suicide. Shortly before the disappearance, Bobby Jamison was involved in a bitter lawsuit with his father, Bob Dean Jamison, claiming that he had threatened the family and had struck him with his vehicle in November 2008. Bobby also alleged that his father was involved in meth and criminal activity. Police do not believe that Bob Dean Jamison was involved in the family's disappearance.

Another popular theory was that the Jamisons themselves were drug dealers. Investigators cited the large amount of cash found in their truck, and the apparent strange behavior exhibited by Bobby and Sherilynn shortly before they went missing. The Jamisons had reportedly told their local pastor, Gary Brandon, on separate occasions that they had seen spirits inside their home and that Bobby had allegedly claimed to have been reading from The Satanic Bible.

== In the media ==
The Jamison disappearance was profiled on the Investigation Discovery series Disappeared in late 2010, in an episode titled "Paradise Lost".

The incident was featured in an episode of the YouTube documentary series BuzzFeed Unsolved.

== See also ==
- List of solved missing person cases (post-2000)
- List of unsolved deaths
- McStay family murders
