= Disappearance of Tabitha Tuders =

2003 disappearance in Nashville, Tennessee U.S.

Tabitha Danielle Tuders
- Tuders prior to her disappearance (left) and an NCMEC age‑progressed image at age 34 (right)
- Born: February 15, 1990; Nashville, Tennessee, U.S.
- Disappeared: April 29, 2003 (aged 13); East Nashville, Tennessee, U.S.
- Status: Missing for 23 years, 6 months and 11 days
- Height: 5 ft 1 in (155 cm)

On April 29, 2003, Tabitha Danielle Tuders, a 13‑year‑old girl from East Nashville, Tennessee, disappeared while walking to her school bus stop. She was last seen that morning following her usual route toward 14th and Boscobel Streets, but she never boarded the bus and did not arrive at school. Her family reported her missing later that day. Despite extensive searches, early witness reports, and later investigative efforts, including a false tip in 2015 and a 2020 search of rural property in Bon Aqua, no confirmed evidence has been found to explain her disappearance, and her whereabouts remain unknown.

== Background ==
Tabitha Danielle Tuders was born on February 15, 1990, in Nashville, Tennessee, the youngest of three children of Debra and Bo Tuders. She grew up in East Nashville and was affectionately known within her family as "Boo." Her mother said she loved to sing, and she was a member of the choir at their church. She was described as a well‑behaved and trustworthy girl who did not skip school or lie to her parents. She attended Bailey Middle School.

== Disappearance ==
Locations
1 bus stop Tuders was last seen heading in the direction of

On April 29, 2003, Tuders' mother left for work at 6:30 a.m., and at about 7:00 a.m. her father woke her for school before leaving for his own job. She typically left the house at 7:50 a.m. to walk to her bus stop at 14th and Boscobel Streets, about a block away, a route that took only a few minutes. She usually had only a brief wait before the bus arrived. She was carrying her report card, on which she had earned all A's. Neighbors later reported seeing her walking along her usual route toward the stop that morning.

Her mother returned from work at about 1:30 p.m. and expected Tuders to arrive home at 4:00 p.m., her usual time. Because she was never late, her mother became concerned when she did not come home and went to the bus stop to look for her. When she did not find her there, she went to the school, where she learned that Tuders had not been on the bus and had not attended any classes that day. Her father arrived home at around 5:00 p.m. Her parents contacted police at 6:00 p.m. to report her missing.

== Investigation ==
After Tuders was reported missing, police set up an operations base in the neighborhood and coordinated an extensive search effort that included scent‑tracking dogs and support from aviation units. Relatives and local residents joined the response by circulating flyers with Tuders's photograph throughout the community.

During later reviews of the case, a detective explained that investigators received numerous tips early in the investigation. One witness reported seeing Tuders walking toward her bus stop and stopping beside a red vehicle. He stated that the car circled back and that he later saw her get into the front passenger seat.

In 2015, investigators received an anonymous report claiming Tuders was in Nebraska, but Nashville police later determined the information was false. Another lead emerged in August 2020, prompting a search of a six‑acre rural property in Bon Aqua that included an abandoned house. Authorities believed she might have been on the property at some point in 2003, though no evidence was found to confirm a connection.

Investigators have stated that several registered sex offenders were living within about a one‑mile radius of the Tuders home at the time of her disappearance.

In 2026, Nashville police renewed their request for the public's help in gathering information related to Tuders' disappearance.

== See also ==
- List of people who disappeared mysteriously (2000–present)
