= Disappearance of Nancy Moyer =

American woman missing since 2009

Nancy Moyer
- Disappeared: c. March 6, 2009 (aged 36); Tenino, Washington, U.S.
- Status: Missing for 17 years, 8 months and 3 days

On March 6, 2009, Nancy Kareen Moyer, a 36‑year‑old financial analyst living in Tenino, Washington, disappeared from her home under unexplained circumstances. She was last seen between 9:00 and 9:30 p.m. by a police officer who observed her carrying shopping bags from her car. Her personal belongings were later found inside the residence, and there were no signs of forced entry or a struggle. Extensive searches of the surrounding area produced no trace of her, and investigators concluded that foul play was likely.

Over the years, several individuals were examined for possible relevance to the case, including Bernard K. Howell III, though no evidence linked him to her disappearance. In 2019, former coworker Eric Lee Roberts contacted 9‑1‑1 and claimed responsibility for Moyer's death before recanting the following day. She remains missing, and the case is unsolved.

== Background ==
Nancy Kareen Moyer grew up in Olympia, Washington, and later studied accounting at Washington State University. While interning at a garden nursery, she met and later married Bill Moyer. The couple had two daughters before separating in 2007, after which they shared custody. At the time of her disappearance, Moyer was living in Tenino and working in Lacey for the Washington State Department of Ecology as a financial analyst.

== Disappearance ==
Locations
1 Grocery store and last known location.
2 Moyers home.

On March 6, 2009, Moyer finished her workday and left at approximately 5:15 p.m., after which she drove a co‑worker home. A receipt recovered from her residence showed a purchase made at 6:45 p.m. at a store located about five minutes from her home. It is not known where she was between that purchase and the time a Tenino police officer reported seeing her outside her home between 9:00 and 9:30 p.m. while running radar in the area. He saw her carrying shopping bags from her vehicle and stated that she appeared to be alone.

On March 8, her husband, Bill, arrived at the house to drop off their two daughters. They found the front door open, and inside were her keys, wallet, and other personal belongings. A glass of wine and a second empty cup were on the coffee table, and the television and lights were on.

== Investigation ==
After Moyer's disappearance was reported, deputies, volunteers, bloodhounds, and cadaver dogs conducted extensive searches around the property and nearby rural areas, but nothing was found. Investigators noted that the house showed no signs of forced entry or a struggle, and her essential belongings were still inside, which led them to suspect foul play. Based on her last confirmed movements and an unusual spike in the home's power usage caused by the front door being left open, detectives believe she disappeared on the night of March 6, likely between 9 p.m. and midnight.

In August 2010, Bernard K. Howell III was arrested in Tenino after deputies located a homicide victim in his vehicle. Because the arrest occurred close to the area where Moyer had disappeared, investigators examined whether he had any connection to the case. They learned that he had previously sold meat door‑to‑door, and the same product was present in Moyer's freezer; a family member also identified him as the individual who had delivered it. Howell denied knowing her or having any involvement in the disappearance, and the inquiry produced no evidence connecting him to the case.

In July 2019, Eric Lee Roberts, a former coworker of Moyer's and the uncle of a man she had dated after her separation, contacted 9-1-1 and said he wanted to admit responsibility for her death. When deputies arrived at his home, he repeated this and told a detective that the incident had occurred during sexual activity at his residence. He also suggested that investigators might find relevant evidence in a fire pit on his property or in his basement. Detectives searched the property and collected items for forensic testing, but no remains were found. Roberts was detained on suspicion of second‑degree murder, but the next day he withdrew his statements and said he did not know why he had confessed.
