= Death of Lynn Messer =

American woman last seen alive on July 8, 2014

Lynn Messer
- Born: Lynn Marie Hoog; June 4, 1962
- Disappeared: July 8, 2014 (aged 52); Bloomsdale, Missouri, U.S.
- Body discovered: Bloomsdale; November 1, 2016
- Known for: Disappearance
- Height: 5 ft 2 in (1.57 m)
- Spouse: Kerry K. Messer (m. 1979)
- Children: 2

Lynn Marie Messer (June 4, 1962 – July 8, 2014) was an American woman who was last seen alive during the early hours of July 8, 2014, in the Bloomsdale, Missouri, farmhouse she shared with her husband. Her disappearance generated national news coverage. On November 1, 2016, her remains were found on the edge of the farm where she had lived.

== Disappearance ==
At approximately 4:00 a.m. on July 8, 2014, Kerry Messer woke up to find that his wife Lynn wasn't in bed beside him. He looked around the house for her, noticing that Lynn's personal belongings—including her ID, passport, wallet, cell phone, car keys, and the walking boot she used to help protect her broken toe—were all still in the house along with a possible suicide note. Kerry checked the areas around their farm where Lynn would normally be as well as the gravel pathways and roads leading to their farmhouse, and began checking locations beyond the farm that morning before his son called the sheriff's office. After ten months of cooperation and over forty in-person and telephone visits with law enforcement, they refused to share the status of the investigation. The last known communication Lynn had with anyone other than her husband was a phone call she made at 11:30 p.m. on the night of July 7.

== Investigation ==
Police quickly classified Lynn as an "endangered person," given the fact that she had a broken toe at the time and left without her walking boot, leading police to speculate that she found herself in physical danger. Local police, professional Search and Rescue, K-9 Teams, highway patrol, and the FBI were called in to locate her. Search dogs picked up a scent trail leading away from the farmhouse on the day Lynn disappeared, but later that day Kerry asked his son Abram to move their herd of cows to a different field, which destroyed the scent trail. The Messer farmhouse was meticulously searched on the first day and on later dates by both local and federal authorities. No evidence indicated any harm or wrongdoing by her husband Kerry, or any indication of a break-in or struggle of any kind, leading police to believe that she hadn't been abducted. Neither the police nor Kerry believed that Lynn had decided to run away from home; she hadn't taken any personal belongings with her, she appeared to enjoy her marriage and family life, and she had recently been discussing exciting future plans such as holidays and Bible classes. After four days of intensive searching, the local Sheriff said he was convinced that Lynn was not on the farm. The official search was suspended and law enforcement supported the family as they continued searching. One of Lynn's sons and one of her brothers-in-law took over directing volunteer search teams for the next 125 days, expending thousands of man-hours in the search.

It was later revealed that Lynn had left a note prior to her disappearance, but the note's contents were not revealed by Kerry Messer. In a subsequent interview, he made public a portion of the note. The full note had previously been provided to Sheriff's personnel, but Kerry said only that "It was some kind of note of finality, but I don't know what that means and to this day I don't understand it." He also said that "the first line was an apology... It was an 'I'm sorry to put you through this... I love you from the bottom of my heart.'" Kerry Messer explained that the note reveals "some conflicts she was going through," although he did not explicitly state that there was an intention of suicide in the note. Kerry has since attributed her death to suicide.

Lynn Messer's son, Abram Messer, said that his mother had previously tried to kill herself one time: "After I asked her several times about it, she said 'I went out to the barn to kill myself, and I shot the cats instead.'"

In the first four days, law enforcement directed the search of the farm and key surrounding areas. From that point, friends and family organized the search parties beyond the farm to try to find Lynn, but all efforts proved unsuccessful. In the months following Lynn's disappearance, over 5,000 acres (2,000 ha) of land were searched, missing posters were posted in Ste. Genevieve county and its surrounding counties, and a Facebook page was set up in order to try and find her. Police sorted through tips provided by members of the public, including many possible sightings that proved to be mistaken identity, but none of the tips provided any useful leads.

As hunting season approached, Kerry created a new not-for-profit educational program, "Support the Hurting," urging hunters, hikers, and other outdoor enthusiasts to be on the lookout for anything suspicious in the woods. His new educational approach was to promote a simple three-step approach to report unusual items which hunters and others might typically ignore. The three-step rule is: "Don't Touch, Document Location, Report to Local Law Enforcement."

== Discovery of body ==
On November 1, 2016, bones were discovered on the Messer Farm about a mile from the house. They were immediately believed to be the remains of Lynn Messer because of glasses and artificial hips found with them, and shortly afterwards they were positively identified as her by means of dental records.

Her remains were examined by Dr. Mary Case. According to Jason Schott, Ste. Genevieve County Sheriff's Department Major: "She sent a report back on what she did and from what Dr. Case could determine from the bones recovered, it does appear [Lynn] was out there for the two year time period. From the time she disappeared until the time she was discovered." The cause of death had not been determined and Schott said the case will remain open until it is. The body was released to the family in March 2017 and Messer was buried in a private ceremony in Greene County, Arkansas, in June.

== See also ==
- List of solved missing person cases (post-2000)
- List of unsolved deaths
