= Disappeared (TV program) =

- Title card (since season 6)
- Genre: True crime; Documentary
- Presented by: Christopher Walker
- Composer: David Varga
- Country of origin: United States
- No. of seasons: 11
- No. of episodes: 143 (list of episodes)

Production
- Executive producers: Benjamin Ringe; Diana Sperrazza; Elizabeth Fischer; Knute Walker; Sharon Scott
- Producer: Various: Angela Martenez; Benjamin Adams Trueheart; Chris Gidez; Courtney Engelstein; Diamaris Welch; Erika Beck Grothues; Heather Walsh; James Cozza; Joe Bergan; Jonathan Damour; Keila Woodard; Kimberly Weinstein; Leslie Mattingly; Lindsay Carswell; Lloyd Fales; Sara Burns; Sarah Gregory; Stephanie Angelides; Gavin Octavien
- Running time: 40–43 minutes
- Production company: Peacock Productions

Original release
- Network: Investigation Discovery
- Release: December 10, 2009 – October 29, 2023

Disappeared is an American documentary television show on Investigation Discovery that debuted on December 10, 2009. The show contains re-enactments and interviews with law enforcement officers, investigators, and relatives connected with cases in which individuals have gone missing. Each episode focuses on a single case of either one individual, or sometimes several individuals who disappeared together.

The show's initial run was composed of six seasons that originally aired between December 2009 to April 2013. Following a three-year-long hiatus, on April 11, 2016, the show resumed on the Investigation Discovery network, debuting its seventh season. In 2021, the show returned as a podcast. In May 2022, it was announced that the show was being rebooted for the 2022–2023 television season. The tenth season premiered September 7, 2022, with the eleventh premiering August 27, 2023.

== Format ==
Disappeared follows a documentary format. It features re-enactments and interviews with family members, friends, and law enforcement connected to the missing subject(s), to explore their recent lives and last actions prior to disappearing. By the time episodes air, some cases had been resolved, with a variety of outcomes, but most often the cases covered have not been explained at the time the episode reaches broadcast. Starting with the tenth season, the series took on a more interview-centric format with no narration and no re-enactments.

== Broadcast history ==
The series debuted on December 10, 2009, featuring the case of Brandi Ellen Wells. After the series' sixth season conclusion in 2013, it was on a three-years-long hiatus. On April 11, 2016, the series returned to Investigation Discovery for a seventh season. The program was renewed for an eighth season, which premiered March 26, 2017. The ninth season premiered March 16, 2018. After its cancellation in 2018, the show was rebooted in 2022 after the success of its spin-off podcast.

== Episodes ==
Season	Episodes (Note: All episode titles and subjects have been adapted from TV Guide's official episode guide.)	Season premiere	Season finale
1	13	December 10, 2009	April 5, 2010
2	13	October 4, 2010	December 27, 2010
3	13	January 3, 2011	March 28, 2011
4	14	April 4, 2011	January 2, 2012
5	17	January 9, 2012	April 30, 2012
6	15	November 19, 2012	April 4, 2013
Specials	4	May 26, 2014	April 12, 2015
7	10	April 11, 2016	June 6, 2016
8	13	March 26, 2017	June 26, 2017
9	13	March 16, 2018	June 24, 2018
10	8	September 7, 2022	November 2, 2022
11	10	August 20, 2023	October 29, 2023

== See also ==
- List of people who disappeared mysteriously
