= Disappearance of Mekayla Bali =

Disappearance of Canadian high school student

Mekayla Margaret Kim Bali
- Born: Mekayla Margaret Kim Niebergall; July 2, 1999; Regina, Saskatchewan, Canada
- Disappeared: April 12, 2016 (aged 16); Yorkton, Saskatchewan, Canada
- Status: Missing for 10 years, 6 months and 26 days
- Height: 157 cm (5 ft 2 in)

The disappearance of Mekayla Bali is an unsolved criminal case from Canada. Bali went missing from her hometown of Yorkton, Saskatchewan, on April 12, 2016. She was last seen between 1:00 and 1:45 p.m. at a local bus stop. Despite several reported sightings, no definitive clues to Bali's whereabouts have been found since then and her fate is currently unknown.

== Mekayla Bali ==
=== Family ===
Bali was born on July 2, 1999, as Mekayla Margaret Kim Niebergall in Regina, Saskatchewan, Canada. Her name changed from Niebergall to Bali, seven months before her disappearance, on September 11, 2015. Her mother, Paula Marie Bali, works as a consultant for the Ministry of Social Services of the Government of Saskatchewan. Her father is not officially known, but after her disappearance, a man named Rick Breit was put forward as her possible biological father. Bali lived with her mother, aunt, maternal grandmother, and two younger siblings in Yorkton, Saskatchewan. Her maternal grandfather died in March 2016, only one month before she went missing.

=== Personality ===
Mekayla's mother described her as a shy and quiet girl. She enjoyed playing the violin and participated in the drama club at her high school, where she was attending 11th grade at the time of her disappearance. Likewise, one of her high school friends described her as "caring" and "very conscious about what [...] her friends' needs were". Bali had no history of disappearing for extended periods of time, and according to her mother, she was not a "risky kid". Although she was bullied at times for her acne, her mother felt that around the time of her disappearance "she was hitting her stride."

=== Appearance ===
Her description states that at the time of her disappearance Bali was 157 cm tall and weighed 56 kg. Her natural hair color is red, but she is known to have changed her hair in the past and was sporting blonde hair at the time of her disappearance. Her eye color is blue and her complexion is described as light/fair. Her distinguishing features include acne, a slight birthmark the size of a dime on her chin, a few scars on her forehead between her eyes from chicken pox, and a row of scars on her thigh from self-harm. Bali sometimes wore glasses.

== Disappearance ==
Based on witness statements and a review of hundreds of hours of surveillance camera footage, investigators were able to reconstruct Bali's movements for a large portion of the day on which she disappeared. As a result, an extensive timeline of her actions from that day exists.

=== Prior events ===
Bali's high school friends told reporters that in the days leading up to her disappearance, she mentioned several places she would soon visit. They also said Bali had claimed to have $5,000 (CAD) in her bank account, although police later confirmed that was not the case. On Monday April 11, one day before she disappeared, she sent a text message to a friend asking for a ride to the local TD Bank the next morning. She also communicated with that bank several times that day and eventually wired $25 to her account. In the evening, she sent messages to several other friends stating that she was unhappy about something and needed help.

=== April 12 ===
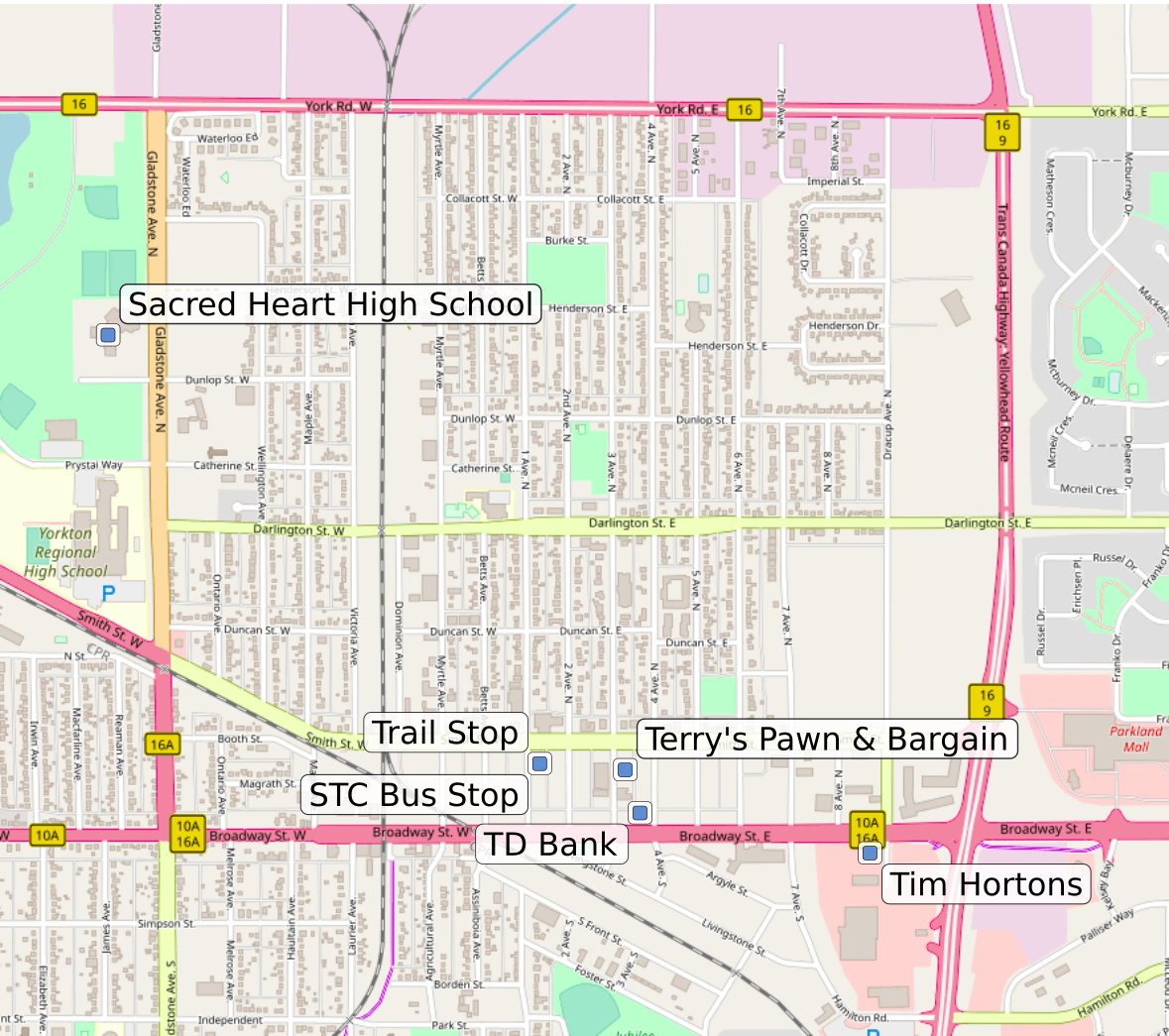
Map of Yorkton showing locations where Mekayla Bali was seen on April 12, 2016

At 6:41 AM on April 12, Bali sent another text message to that friend asking again for a ride to the local TD Bank. The friend refused since the bank was not yet open. Her mother said "April 12 was just a really regular morning in our house". Bali's grandmother drove her to school, arriving between 8:10 AM and 8:20 AM CCTV footage shows her putting a binder inside her locker at 8:21 AM and leaving the school through the back entrance at 8:30. She was next seen by a surveillance camera walking southeast along the railroad tracks. The clerk of Terry's Pawn and Bargain, a local pawn shop, told police that, between 8:40 AM and 8:50 AM, Bali attempted to pawn a silver ring; as it was low value, he did not make her an offer. Shortly thereafter, between 8:50 AM and 8:55 AM, she was seen at the bank withdrawing $55.00 from her account. After she left, surveillance footage shows her, at 9:00 AM, walking east on Broadway Street.

At about 9:10 AM, cameras recorded her entering a combined Tim Hortons/Wendy's restaurant, buying a drink and sitting down at a table. She seemed to take her phone apart at one point and put it back together. Less than 15 minutes later, she left the restaurant, re-entered almost immediately, and left through another exit. Over the next 25 minutes, she was spotted by several cameras near the restaurant. Her movements during this time formed a wide circle, covering the area around the restaurant in a counterclockwise direction. At 9:49 AM, she returned to the restaurant and sat down at another table. Over the next 20 minutes, she used her phone repeatedly, sending text messages and making what appear to be lengthy phone calls. At 10:12 AM, she texted a friend saying, "Hey, I need help" followed by, "Nevermind I figured it out", a few minutes later. She left, and re-entered, again. At 10:43 AM, she started a short conversation with an older woman, who told police Bali had asked her for help in renting a hotel room, which she declined. After the conversation, Bali used her telephone again and left the restaurant for the last time.

After leaving Tim Hortons, cameras show her at 10:45 AM walking west on Broadway Street East. She took a short turn down 7th Avenue but then returned to Broadway Street East, continuing westward until she left the camera's view. She does not appear on any other surveillance footage for more than an hour after that. But shortly after that footage, an employee at the local STC Bus Depot recalls her asking when the next bus to Regina would leave. Upon being told that would not be until 5:00 PM, she left without buying a ticket. This appears to have happened sometime between 11:00 AM and 11:45 AM At 11:35 AM she sent another text message to her friend: "I'll see you at lunch" and at 11:59 AM re-entered her school and met with two other students in the school cafeteria. They confirmed that she told them about plans to take a bus to Regina for vacation. Cameras show her leaving the school at 12:03 PM She was next seen at the Trail Stop Restaurant, attached to the bus depot, where she ordered lunch. According to eyewitnesses, she left the restaurant between 1:00 PM and 1:45 PM. After that, no one remembers seeing her, and she does not appear on any other surveillance footage. Police were able to verify that she did not get on any of the buses that day. When last seen, she was wearing glasses, a teal/mint infinity scarf, jeans, a three-quarter-length burgundy or purple coat, with her blonde wavy hair worn down.

=== Subsequent events ===
Bali's phone was turned off at 6:51 AM the next morning. According to the police, Bali has not used any of her social media accounts since. One possible exception occurred three months later when a Snapchat message sent to her by one of her friends became marked as opened. However, it could not be determined if anyone actually viewed it. Police also confirmed that her bank account has not been used since then and she does not have a passport with her, which is necessary for international travel.

== Investigation ==
External image
- Picture of Bali as used by the RCMP in the search

Bali's disappearance was noticed by her family on the afternoon of April 12, 2016, when her grandmother went to pick her up from school. When she learned that Bali had not been at school all day, she contacted Bali's mother. The two women initially searched for Bali themselves. When they could not find any sign of her after hours of searching, they reported her missing to the police in the evening of the same day.

=== Police search ===
Her case was initially handled by the Yorkton RCMP, who asked the public for help in locating her on April 14, 2016. After three weeks, Yorkton RCMP handed the Bali file over to the General Investigations Section (GIS), a dedicated unit that investigates major offenses. On July 21, three months after she went missing, RCMP escalated their search by issuing a child search alert for the provinces of Alberta, Saskatchewan and Manitoba. On the first anniversary of Bali's disappearance, the investigation was handed over to the RCMP Historical Case Unit. On December 4, 2017, the child search alert was renewed and expanded across Canada.

Police reviewed hundreds of hours of surveillance camera footage provided by local businesses and conducted dozens of interviews with potential witnesses to piece together Bali's movements on April 12, 2016. Although she used her phone extensively throughout the day, no phone calls were registered by her cell phone provider and she is believed to have used social media apps to communicate. Investigators said it was a challenge to obtain information from these companies. In August 2017, RCMP conducted a three-day, ground grid search in a wooded area near Bali's high school in Yorkton. However, no new evidence regarding Bali's whereabouts resulted from the search. Police never confirmed a suspect in the case, but did announce a person of interest. This person was seen by witnesses leaving the Trail Stop Restaurant with Bali. He was described as having a stocky build, muscular arms, dark hair, and a large, prominent tattoo of a fiery cross on his forearm. The man eventually reported to the police, who were able to question him. In addition, police were able to locate several online acquaintances of Bali and contacted the hotels in the area. However, none of these efforts led to any further leads. In 2019, police began releasing extensive surveillance camera footage in hopes that it would bring new leads from people who saw Bali that day.

=== Reported sightings ===
Both police and her family received hundreds of tips to her possible whereabouts over the years including possible sightings. On October 9, 2016, it was reported that Bali was believed to be in Vancouver. Her mother traveled to the city to set up a poster campaign in help for locating her daughter. In 2017, the police service of the Tsuutʼina Nation reported that they believed that Bali attended an event in January 2017 at the Grey Eagle Entertainment Centre. On August 8, 2019, Bali's mother received a call from a man claiming to have seen Bali in Edmonton. Her mother said that she is considering going there to investigate for herself. Another possible sighting of Bali panhandling in Penticton was made in January 2020. However, local police were able to confirm that the person in question was not Bali.

=== Private efforts ===
To help in the search, Bali's family organized fundraising events that allowed them to offer a $25,000 (CAD) reward for any information leading to her safe return. On July 31, 2017, the National Center for Missing & Exploited Children joined the search effort and began disseminating information about the then 18-year-old Mekayla Bali. On December 11, 2018, an anonymous donor helped to double the reward for Bali's safe return, from that initial $25,000 to a total of $50,000. However, on January 8, 2020, the reward was cut in half again after the donor needed to ask for his money back. For the fifth anniversary of her disappearance, additional fundraising efforts helped to raise the reward again to $40,000. On the sixth anniversary of her disappearance, an anonymous donor added $60,000 to the reward fund, bringing the total reward to $100,000.

== Media coverage ==
From the beginning, Bali's mother has continuously worked to keep her daughter's disappearance in the public's consciousness by organizing fundraising events and media appearances. In August 2017, she gave an extensive interview for The Night Time Podcast. Being featured on one of Canada's most popular podcasts helped Bali’s case become known across the country, and over the years her case has been profiled on several true crime podcasts like Dark Poutine, True North True Crime, and True Crime Timeline. Also in 2017, Bali's disappearance was one of the 10 highlighted cases on the International Missing Children's Day on May 25 by The Missing Children Society of Canada. In 2019, CFRE-DT produced the television feature "Still Searching: The disappearance of Mekayla Bali" which went on to win the Trina McQueen Award in the TV News Information Program category in April of the following year, as well as an Edward R. Murrow Award the following month. Also in 2019, Bali's disappearance was covered by the investigative duo Victoria Dinh and Alicia Bridges who wrote a long-form news feature about her case that included interviews with her high school friends. After extensive video footage was released by the RCMP, her case was increasingly covered on video-sharing sites. As of 2025, YouTube videos about her disappearance have received several million views, significantly increasing public awareness of her case.

== Theories ==
Due to the continued interest in her disappearance, her case has been discussed extensively online. Theories about her fate include her running away, committing suicide, being trafficked, and becoming the victim of an online predator possibly using a false identity.

=== Runaway ===
Police have consistently treated Bali's disappearance as a missing persons case and said that they have no evidence of foul play. Likewise, high school friends have opined that her actions that day were intentional on her part, with one of them saying "I know it was her decision but still I'm kind of kicking myself over it". Some of Bali's social media posts indicated that she "was unhappy and planned to leave", however, her mother points out that these posts are very old and were no longer relevant at the time of her disappearance. Jordan Bonaparte, the host of The Night Time Podcast, said in an interview that "[i]nitially, I thought it was a clear-cut case of a runaway teen," but then added that he changed his mind since "[t]he longer it went, the less likely [it became]". Similarly, Bali's mother said she initially thought her daughter might have run away, but that she quickly changed her mind when she realized that her acne medication, as well as money she kept at home for emergencies, were untouched.

=== Human trafficking ===
The National Center for Missing & Exploited Children defines trafficking in the context of missing children on its website as "a form of child abuse that occurs when a child under 18 is advertised, solicited or exploited through a commercial sex act". In 2019, a government report was released detailing the problem of human trafficking in Saskatoon, citing "oil and gas developments [with] a largely male, transient workforce" as a major reason for its prevalence in the region. In particular the cities of Winnipeg, Edmonton, Calgary and Regina were named as important hubs. Yorkton, the place where Bali disappeared, is in the middle of these places. Consistent with this, Bali's mother has said several times that she fears her daughter may have become a victim of trafficking.

=== Online predator ===
Bali had an extensive online presence on a number of social media apps where she chatted with other people often using a number of different aliases. On March 1, 2016, Bali wrote both on her Snapchat and one of her Instagram accounts: "Looking for Snapchat friends because I have none in real life. Add me ...", which led to speculations that she was subsequently contacted by a person involved in her disappearance. Investigators have consequently put substantial effort into acquiring information on her online history but said that US privacy laws caused significant delays. Bali's mother said she supported these efforts by giving them "all of the passwords, everything to Mekayla’s accounts". One app in particular, the messaging app Kik, has been singled out by Bali's friends as well as investigators as being a cause for concern. Kik has been accused of providing inadequate parental control and offering anonymity to potentially malicious actors and Bali's friends have confirmed that they did not know much about who she was in contact with online.

== See also ==
- List of people who disappeared mysteriously (2000–present)
- Disappearance of Andrew Gosden, English teenage boy who secretly returned home from school in the morning and caught a train to London
- Disappearance of Emma Fillipoff – 2012 mysterious disappearance of a Canadian woman
- Disappearance of Ruth Wilson – Unsolved 1995 disappearance of 16-year-old in Surrey
