= Mekayla =

Mekayla is a feminine given name. Notable people with the name include:

- Mekayla Bali (1999 – disappeared 2016), Canadian girl
- Mekayla Diehl (born 1988), American beauty pageant titleholder
