= Disappearance of Ruth Wilson =

Unsolved 1995 disappearance of 16-year-old in Surrey

Coordinates: 51.2546405°N 0.2790474°W

Ruth Wilson
- Born: 31 January 1979; Betchworth, Surrey, England
- Disappeared: 27 November 1995 (aged 16); Box Hill, Surrey, England
- Status: Missing for 30 years, 10 months and 16 days
- Education: The Ashcombe School
- Height: 5 ft 1 in (1.55 m)

On 27 November 1995, Ruth Wilson, a 16‑year‑old British girl from Betchworth near Dorking in Surrey, disappeared on Box Hill. Her whereabouts remain unknown. Wilson was a sixth‑form student at The Ashcombe School and lived with her father, stepmother and younger sister on Wonham Lane in Betchworth. She spent the morning in Dorking, ordered flowers for her stepmother, and later travelled by taxi to Box Hill, where she was last seen at around 4:30 pm.

Despite extensive searches, public appeals and periodic reviews of the case, no confirmed sightings have been made and the circumstances of her disappearance remain unexplained.

== Family and home life ==
Ruth Wilson was born on 31 January 1979, the eldest daughter of Ian and Nesta Wilson. Her parents married in 1976 in Newport. When she was three and her sister Jenny was a few months old, their mother died by suicide on 10 December 1982. According to the account given to Wilson by the family, Nesta's death was said to have been caused by an accidental fall down stairs, but her death certificate recorded suicide by hanging. Wilson became aware of the true nature of her mother's death before she disappeared.

Ian remarried in late 1983, marrying Karen I. Bowerman in Surrey. They were teachers: he was head of science at a secondary school, and she was deputy head of a primary school. Ian also served as a local parish councillor. The family lived in a cottage on Wonham Lane in Betchworth, Surrey at the time of Wilson's disappearance.

Wilson enjoyed reading, music, and cycling. She played the electric guitar and piano. She had a Saturday job in a music shop and was a popular local babysitter. She was studying for her A levels at The Ashcombe School Sixth Form when she disappeared. She attended her local church, St Michael's, where she sang in the choir, played the organ, and took part in bell‑ringing. School friends described her as intelligent and quirky, with a small but close‑knit group of friends.

Wilson's friend Catherine Mair was due to move to Sheffield, South Yorkshire, and Wilson had asked if she could join her once she was settled. Wilson went missing a few weeks after she moved. Mair's mother recalled that Wilson had slept over shortly before she disappeared and had been adamant that she did not want to return home, without explaining why. Mair stated that Wilson had talked about running away but not suicide. Ian and Karen disputed allegations that her home life was unhappy. Friends and family also said that Wilson was not suicidal.

== Events ==
Two days before her disappearance, Wilson worked her usual Saturday job in a music shop in Dorking, then went for a meal with her ex-boyfriend Will Kennedy, with whom she remained on good terms, and another friend, Neil Phillipson. Kennedy and Phillipson both stated that Wilson paid for the meal.

On the day before she disappeared, Wilson went to handbell practice at her local church, then to a youth group in Dorking, and later to Kennedy's home for supper. His mother gave her some old clothing and she later went home. Her family recalled her being relaxed.

=== Disappearance ===
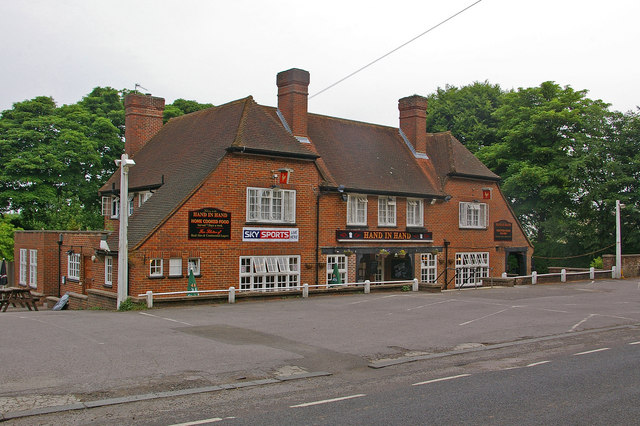
The Hand in Hand pub, 2010

On the day she disappeared, Wilson's father and stepmother left early for work, leaving Wilson and Jenny to catch the school bus. Ian had an Ofsted inspection at the school where he worked and was in a hurry to leave. He recalled last seeing Wilson listening to her Walkman as he left the house, and that he was stressed; his last words to her were "Out of my way. I'm in a hurry" as he pushed past her. At the last moment Wilson told Jenny she was not going on the bus. Jenny was not surprised, as Wilson was in the sixth form and did not always attend for the full day, though she was surprised that her sister left it so late to say so.

Shortly after Jenny left, Kennedy arrived in his car and offered Wilson a lift. She declined, saying she would meet him later. She did not attend school at all that day, which her family and peers considered uncharacteristic. At around 11:30 am, Wilson took a taxi into Dorking. Around midday, she ordered flowers for her stepmother from Thistles Florists at 257 Dorking High Street and asked that they not be delivered until the following Wednesday.

Wilson spent the afternoon in Dorking Library. Around 4 pm, she took a taxi from Dorking railway station to Box Hill. She was dropped off on a bridleway near the Hand in Hand pub (now the Chalk Hare). The taxi driver stated that Wilson stood still in the rain as he drove off, which he found unusual, as passengers typically walk away. In other accounts, he said she appeared to be looking around for someone. He was the last person to see her, at 4:30 pm.

At the time of her disappearance, Wilson was wearing a red knitted jumper, black velvet trousers, black pixie boots, and a small lady's watch on her left wrist. She had a small blue duffel bag containing a personal stereo and tapes. Liam McAuley, a 58-year-old retired police officer investigating the case, observed that Wilson was "dressed to get into another car" or may have been waiting until the taxi driver left so he did not see where she went, implying that a third party may have been involved and that running away seemed more likely than suicide. He also stated that disappearing completely would be "very difficult". Wilson disappeared 14 days before the 13th anniversary of her mother's death.

=== Investigation and aftermath ===
Wilson's family became concerned when she did not return home that evening and learnt from her school that she had not attended classes. They contacted the police, and using information from the taxi driver who had dropped her on Box Hill, local officers carried out a search of the immediate area.

That night Surrey Police organised a wider search with a helicopter, police dogs, and heat-seeking equipment. They searched the Box Hill area but found no firm clues as to her whereabouts. It was later discovered that she often went to Box Hill after school. She had also been concerned about her school performance and had kept a school report from her father and stepmother that weekend.

On 29 November, the flowers ordered by Wilson were delivered to her stepmother. Ian described them as an "expensive bouquet". There was no note attached. Wilson's friend Mair interpreted this gesture as "sticking two fingers up" to her stepmother.

On 1 December, as reported in The Times (29 December 1995), police found three notes hidden under a bush in the undergrowth at the top edge of Betchworth Quarry on Box Hill. The notes amounted to farewells to her father, stepmother, her best friend, and a teenage boy she knew. Nearby were empty packets of paracetamol and a half-empty bottle of Vermouth.

On 2 December, a large-scale search was organised by the police and fire and rescue services involving 60 volunteers, including local residents, school friends, colleagues, and National Trust wardens. A police helicopter, tracker dogs, and thermal imaging equipment were used. A detailed search of the Betchworth Quarry end of Box Hill was carried out by a trained search and rescue team and employees of the quarry owners, Nionisle Ltd.

Mark Williams-Thomas, the family liaison officer, stated that extensive searches across Box Hill had found no evidence to suggest she was killed or took her own life. He also said he was sure Wilson was not abducted by a stranger. He stated: "From the experience I have had, I would suggest one of two things occurred. She either went up there to meet someone and has subsequently gone away, or she went there and died in some way."

On 8 December, Ian and Karen on ITV's mid-morning programme This Morning to appeal for information. They said they believed their daughter was alive but afraid to come home.

Eight months after the disappearance, Mair was visited at her home in Sheffield by South Yorkshire Police. Officers paused their questioning to look in her wardrobe, as if Wilson might have been hiding there. The case was assigned the code name Operation Scholar. The unsolved missing‑person case is reviewed regularly and is led by DCI Alex Geldart. Surrey Police have stated that the investigation would be re‑opened if new evidence or lines of enquiry emerged.

In 2006, Ian wrote an open letter to his daughter, asking her to come home and appealing for any information about her whereabouts.

In 2018, a local newspaper issued an appeal to anyone who had known Wilson to come forward with information. Roxy Birch, who had known Wilson at school and portrayed her in a police reconstruction video, said that Wilson did not drive and did not own a passport at the time, which would have made long‑distance and international travel more difficult. Another friend, Kay Blenard, stated: "My belief is that she had planned to do something. I don't know whether that would be permanent or temporary. I'd also like to believe that someone knows what happened."

Also in 2018, Jon Savell, chief superintendent of public protection of Surrey Police, stated: "There are five explanations for Ruth Wilson's disappearance; A tragic accident, abduction, suicide, murder, or that she had absented herself to start a new life."

In 2025, Surrey police stated that Wilson's case remains a missing person inquiry and that they "continue to keep an open mind about what is behind Ruth's disappearance" and "at this time, there is no further evidence to support any one particular line of inquiry about what has happened to Ruth."

== Possible sightings ==
On the first anniversary of the disappearance, a girl thought to resemble Wilson was captured on CCTV at a newsagent's shop in Dorking, two miles from Box Hill. She appeared distressed and asked for a copy of each local newspaper, becoming visibly upset when told that one had sold out. The shop owner reported the encounter to the police and kept the CCTV footage. The local newspapers carried reference to Wilson's disappearance. In an article in The Times on 2 January 1997, Wilson's parents said they believed the girl in the video was Wilson.

Speaking on the 10th anniversary, Sgt Shane Craven, head of East Surrey police's missing persons team, stated that "In the weeks following Ruth's disappearance there were some fairly reliable sightings of her in the Dorking area by people who knew her well." Sightings have been reported as far away as Canada. A Surrey Advertiser article by Rebecca Younger (9 December 2008) announced an appeal to mark the 13th anniversary. The missing‑persons team said they had followed up every lead.

== Documentary ==
A documentary film about the case, Vanished: The Surrey Schoolgirl, was produced in 2018. It introduced new witnesses, mainly friends of Wilson. Her father and stepmother were asked if they wished to take part but declined.

== See also ==
- List of people who disappeared mysteriously (2000–present)
- Disappearance of Andrew Gosden – 2007 disappearance of 14-year-old in London
- Murder of Milly Dowler – 2002 murder of English schoolgirl
- Disappearance of Mekayla Bali – Disappearance of Canadian high school student
