= Vanished (British TV series) =

2023 British TV series

- Also known as: Vanished Live; Vanished: The Hunt for Britain's Missing People; Vanished: The Search for Britain's Missing
- Genre: Factual
- Presented by: Dan Walker
- Country of origin: United Kingdom
- Original language: English
- No. of series: 2
- No. of episodes: 8 (+1 special)

Production
- Running time: 60 minutes
- Production company: ITN

Original release
- Network: Channel 5
- Release: February 10 – November 23, 2023

Vanished: The Hunt for Britain's Missing People is a British TV series that was first broadcast in 2023. It is presented by Dan Walker and broadcast on Channel 5. It is a Crimewatch-style news factual series in conjunction with the Missing People charity and produced by ITN.

== Episodes ==
Series 1 had 4 episodes.

Series	Title	Episode	Date	Featured cases
—N/a	Vanished Live; Vanished: Where is Nicola Bulley?	Special	February 10, 2023	Death of Nicola Bulley
1	Vanished: The Hunt for Britain's Missing People	1	March 31, 2023	Disappearance of Claudia Lawrence
1	Vanished: The Hunt for Britain's Missing People	2	April 7, 2023	Disappearance of Luke Durbin
1	Vanished: The Hunt for Britain's Missing People	3	April 14, 2023	Craig Hetherington
1	Vanished: The Hunt for Britain's Missing People	4	April 22, 2023	Anthony Stammers
2	Vanished: The Search for Britain's Missing	1	November 1, 2023	Grace Fisher
2	Vanished: The Search for Britain's Missing	2	November 8, 2023	Daniel Wawrzynczak
2	Vanished: The Search for Britain's Missing	3	November 15, 2023	Marcus Rigby
2	Vanished: The Search for Britain's Missing	4	November 23, 2023	Disappearance of Alex Sloley

== See also ==
- Reported Missing, a British documentary television series broadcast on BBC One since 2017
- Missing Live, a BBC One morning television series which was broadcast between 2005 and 2011
