= Disappearance of Alex Sloley =

Unsolved 2008 disappearance of 16-year-old British student from London

Coordinates: 51.5617924°N 0.1169903°W

Alex Sloley
- Alex Sloley's campaign poster by Missing People
- Born: Alexander Sloley; 4 August 1991
- Disappeared: 2 August 2008 (aged 16); Islington, London, England
- Status: Missing for 18 years, 2 months and 24 days
- Occupation: Accountancy student
- Mother: Nerissa Tivy

Alexander Sloley (born 4 August 1991) was a British boy who disappeared without a trace on 2 August 2008 in Edmonton, north London, England, when he was 16. No evidence of his fate has been found, and his current whereabouts remain unknown.

== Background ==
Sloley went by the nickname "Gog". He had studied at the Islington Arts and Media School in north London and was attending City and Islington College.

Sloley was described as someone who dressed smartly and was not scruffy. He liked football and eating traditional West Indian food such as fried plantain, dumplings, and porridge.

His parents were separated, and he had three sisters: Tasha, Tazrah and Lattina. Sloley's father, Christopher, died in 2014 without learning of his son's fate.

== Disappearance ==
Sloley had been staying at a friend's house in Edmonton, north London. He left there around noon on 2 August 2008 to return home for his 17th birthday, in two days' time, but never arrived. When he disappeared he had little money and no change of clothes. Sloley did not have his passport and while he did have a mobile phone with him, it stopped connecting to a network when he went missing. His disappearance was described as uncharacteristic.

Police found nothing to indicate where Sloley may have gone. "It's like he disappeared off the face of the planet," one officer said in 2012. Sloley has never been identified on CCTV footage.

== Subsequent investigation ==
In September 2009 a possible sighting was reported in Ilford, east London, but was never confirmed. In October 2009 the charity Missing People and supermarket Iceland arranged for Sloley's story and photo to appear on milk cartons. Sloley's was one of the first cases to be publicised in such a manner, and he was featured on nearly 13.5 million milk cartons.

In July 2015, Sloley's mother Nerissa Tivy was surprised to learn that police had received numerous reports of sightings in 2009. Tivy stated that she had met with police a number of times and they had never told her about this list.

In September 2017, Mick Neville, retired head of the Metropolitan Police's Central Images Unit, drew comparisons between Sloley's disappearance and that of another bright maths student who disappeared without a trace in London. Andrew Gosden was 14 when he disappeared in 2007, less than a year before Sloley. Gosden's last known location was King's Cross, and when Sloley disappeared he was thought to have been on his way to Islington, two miles from King's Cross. Neville said "It raises the question on whether there is a serial killer on the prowl? ...the potential links between these cases need to be recognised."

In September 2019, the Metropolitan Police released an updated e-fit depicting Sloley as he may have looked at that time. It was reported that there had been no use of Sloley's national insurance, bank account or passport in the intervening 11 years. Detective Constable Tom Boom of the Missing Persons Unit stated that there was no evidence of harm but the case had gone cold and there were no major leads. Alex had come to the attention of the police before he went missing on July 11, 2008 but police indicated there “was nothing to suggest this was linked to his disappearance”.

== Media ==
In August 2023 Sloley was the subject of a three episode podcast Where is Alex? while in November he featured in episode 4 of Vanished series 2.

== See also ==
- List of people who disappeared mysteriously (2000–present)
