= Dan Walker (broadcaster) =

British journalist (born 1977)

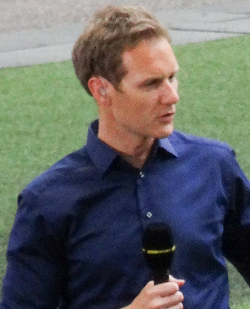
- Walker in 2017
- Born: Daniel Meirion Walker; 19 March 1977 (age 49); Crawley, England
- Education: Hazelwick School
- Alma mater: University of Sheffield (BA, MA)
- Occupations: Journalist, television presenter
- Employer(s): Paramount Networks UK & Australia, Channel 5, Classic FM
- Television: 5 News
- Spouse: Sarah Walker (m. 2001)
- Children: 3
- Website: danwalker.tv

Daniel Meirion Walker (born 19 March 1977) is a British journalist, newsreader and television presenter from Crawley, England. He has presented 5 News on Channel 5 since June 2022 and the weekday breakfast show on Classic FM since January 2024.

Walker was the host of Football Focus from 2009 to 2021, as well as BBC Breakfast from 2016 until May 2022. He also presented shows on BBC Radio 5 Live and presented Sportsday on the BBC News Channel and BBC World News, as well as regularly reporting for Final Score and Match of the Day.

== Early life ==
Daniel Meirion Walker was born on 19 March 1977 in Crawley, to an English father and Welsh mother. He lived in Crawley with his parents, two sisters and a brother, where he attended Ifield Primary School, Three Bridges Middle School, and Hazelwick Secondary School.

He moved to Sheffield to study, earning a BA (Hons) degree in History in 1998, plus MA degree in Journalism Studies in 1999, at the University of Sheffield. He was later awarded an Honorary LittD in 2019.

== Career ==
=== Radio ===
In 1998, Walker's professional broadcasting career started with work experience at Sheffield's Hallam FM. In 1999, Walker moved to a full-time career with a four-year stint as a sports presenter and commentator for Manchester's Key 103.

In 2015, in addition to his TV presenting work, Walker co-presented Afternoon Edition every Monday–Thursday on BBC Radio 5 Live until 2016.

From 8 January 2024, Walker became the regular presenter of the weekday breakfast show on Classic FM.

=== Television ===
In 2003, Walker moved into television, joining Granada Television in Manchester, as a commentator on the Football League Review show. In 2004, he started at the BBC for the regional news programme North West Tonight, where he was nominated for 'Nations and Regions Sports Presenter or Commentator' at the Royal Television Society Sports Awards in 2005.

In 2006, Walker started working in London, in 2008, his first moment presenting on national television being an interview on Henman Hill at 2008 Wimbledon Championships, when Andy Murray was playing Richard Gasquet. He has since covered The Open, Aintree, Ascot and The Derby at Epsom as well as the Six Nations.

In August 2009, Walker took over from Manish Bhasin as the presenter of the BBC's Football Focus, a slot he held for 12 years, before eventually being succeeded by Alex Scott in 2021.

Walker was part of the BBC Sport team covering the 2010 FIFA World Cup from the England team base.

On 26 November 2011, Gary Speed appeared as a guest on Football Focus with Walker. The two men spent a total of about four hours with each other on the day. Walker said of Speed: "I always found him to be kind, funny, intelligent and insightful. I found him to be a top bloke and really enjoyed his company." The following morning on Sunday 27 November 2011, Walker received the news that Speed had died by suicide at his house in Cheshire. Walker said that he was "stunned" by Speed's death and that he was "incredibly saddened". He had known Speed for quite a long time and had played football with him in a charity match two months earlier. In March 2012, Walker said that he was "staggered by the depth of feeling and shock" on the Sunday when Speed's death was announced.

For the 2012 London Olympics, Walker presented a nightly post-midnight round-up of the day's events. At the Glasgow 2014 Commonwealth Games, Walker presented coverage of the evening session for BBC Three. For the Rio 2016 Games, Walker took on a similar role, presenting action throughout the evening and night live from the beach on BBC Four. For the delayed Tokyo 2020 Olympics, Walker co-hosted Olympic Breakfast with Sam Quek each morning.

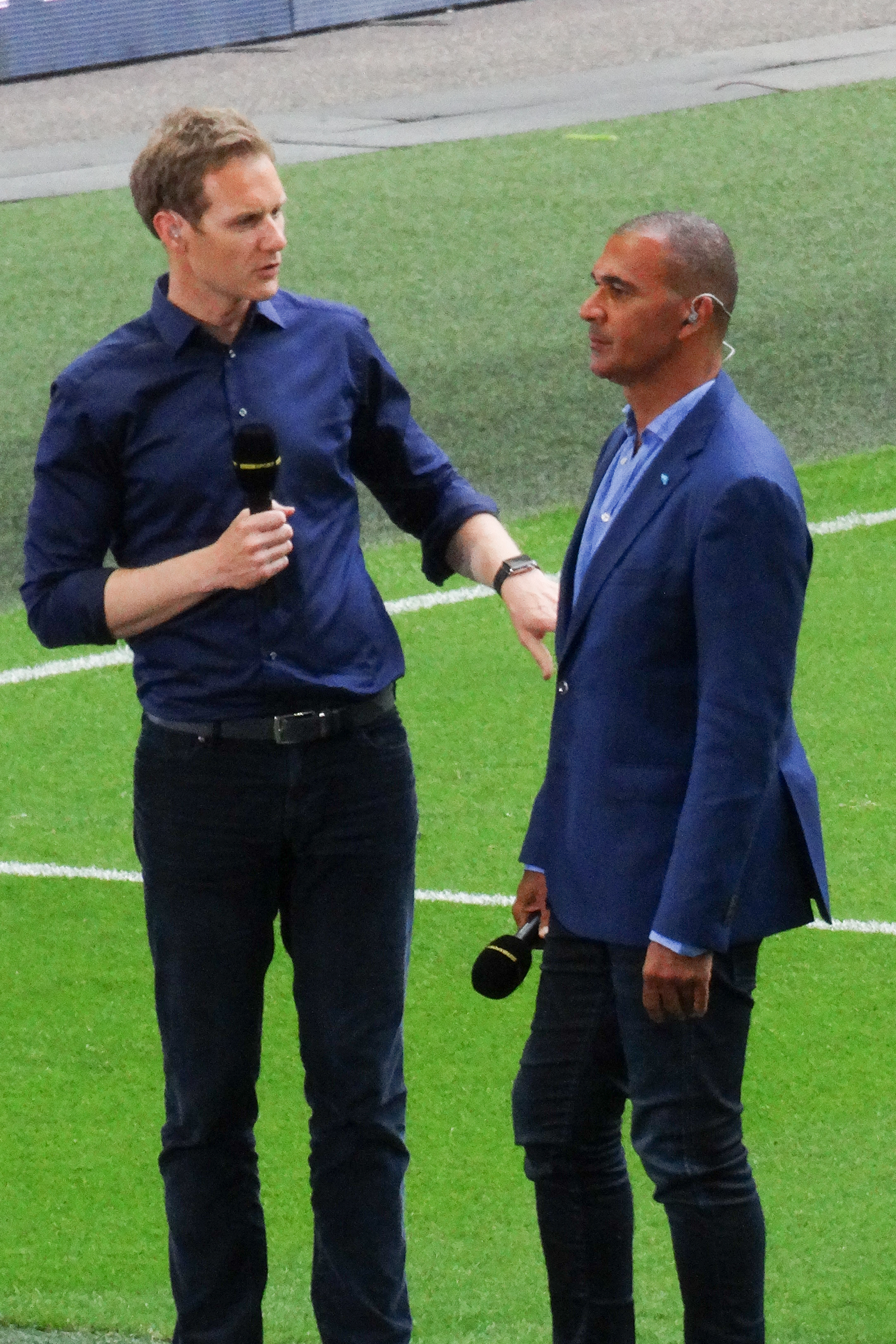
Walker (left) interviewing Ruud Gullit at the 2017 FA Cup Final

In 2016, Walker replaced Bill Turnbull as presenter of BBC Breakfast. His first show aired on 29 February and he presented the programme from Monday to Wednesday with Louise Minchin until mid-2021, and with Sally Nugent from late 2021 onwards. Walker presented the 'Clash of the Titans' segment of the Sport Relief telethon.

In January 2019, Walker had a chance meeting with Tony Foulds, in Endcliffe Park, Sheffield, where Foulds was voluntarily maintaining the "Mi Amigo" memorial. Foulds, then aged eight, was in Endcliffe Park when a USAAF Boeing B-17 Flying Fortress bomber crashed in the park in February 1944; the crash killed all ten men on board.

After the meeting, Walker started a campaign on social media to organise a flypast at the park. The campaign was successful, and the flypast took place on 22 February 2019, the 75th anniversary of the crash. The event was broadcast nationally and thousands of people, including the families of the airmen involved in the crash, attended the flypast.

In November 2020, Walker was confirmed as the new host of The NFL Show following previous host Mark Chapman's decision to step down.

Walker left Football Focus after 12 years on 22 May 2021; he continued as a presenter on BBC Breakfast and BBC Sport.

On 10 August 2021, it was announced he would be competing in the nineteenth series of Strictly Come Dancing. He was paired with the Ukrainian-Slovenian professional Nadiya Bychkova. They were eliminated in week 11, coming 5th.

In September 2021, Walker was one of many offering tributes to his co-presenter Louise Minchin who left BBC Breakfast after 20 years of working on the programme.

On 4 April 2022, Walker announced, via a Twitter video, that he would be leaving the BBC to move to Channel 5. On 6 June 2022, Walker made his Channel 5 news debut, reporting live from 10 Downing Street when prime minister Boris Johnson survived a no confidence vote.

In December 2022, Walker took part in and won, an episode of the quiz show The Weakest Link, with all contestants having previously been involved in Strictly Come Dancing.

In 2023 Vanished began on Channel 5 with Walker as presenter.

In April 2026, Walker was due to appear as a respondent in an employment tribunal brought by his former Channel 5 News co-host Claudia-Liza Vanderpuije. The case, which included claims of discrimination and harassment on grounds of race and sex, was withdrawn when the parties reached a mutual agreement before any evidence was heard. Vanderpuije withdrew her allegations against Walker in return for being paid an undisclosed amount of money by Channel 5 and ITN. Walker said: "I firmly feel that I should never have been pulled into this; however, I was fully prepared to go to tribunal and defend the allegations which were levelled at me. I will be forever grateful to those who were kind enough to go on the record with their accounts of working alongside me."

== Charity work ==
Walker is an active patron of several charities including the Sheffield Children's Hospital charity, and attended an event for the cause in 2012, at Sheffield City Hall, alongside fellow University of Sheffield Alumna Jessica Ennis-Hill.

In 2019, Walker climbed Mount Kilimanjaro for Comic Relief with a number of other celebrities, including Dani Dyer, Ed Balls, Shirley Ballas, Alexander Armstrong and Anita Rani.

== Personal life ==
Walker lives in Fulwood, Sheffield. He has been married to Sarah since 2001. The couple met at Sheffield University and they have two daughters and a son. He supports Crawley Town.

He is a practising Christian who has maintained his position not to work on Sunday throughout his career.

In February 2023, Walker was taken to hospital after being in a collision with a car while cycling in Sheffield. He later said that wearing a helmet saved his life.

== Books ==
- Dan Walker's Football Thronkersaurus: Football's Finest Tales (Simon & Schuster, 2014) ISBN 978-1471136290
- Magic, Mud and Maradona: Cup Football's Finest Tales (Simon & Schuster, 2016) ISBN 978-1471136313
- Remarkable People: Extraordinary Stories of Everyday Lives (Headline, 2021) ISBN 978-1472278890
- Standing on the Shoulders: Incredible Heroes and How They Inspire Us (Headline, 2022) ISBN 978-1472291271
