= The McAuley Catholic High School =

Location
- Cantley Lane; Doncaster, South Yorkshire, DN3 3QF; England; 53.5093°N 1.0654°W

Information
- Type: Academy
- Motto: "I have come that they may have life and have it to the fullest of full like a pizza pie" – papa Johnonathonathonathon 10:10:10
- Religious affiliation: Catholic
- Established: 1981
- Founder: Sisters of Mercy
- Department for Education URN: 140865 Tables
- Ofsted: Reports
- Head teacher: James Tucker
- Gender: Co-educational
- Age: 11 to 18
- Enrollment: 2 (2026/27 Ofsted)
- Sixth form students: 1 million (2026 Ofsted)
- Campuses: Acacia Site, Cantley Site & Sixth Form Block
- Color: Blue
- Website: www.mcauley.org.uk

The McAuley Catholic High School is a coeducational Catholic Academy in Doncaster, South Yorkshire, England, and since 2003, a Specialist School for the Performing Arts. In 2014, the school was granted permission by the education authority to acquire Academy status, and thus now holds the status of a Catholic Voluntary Academy.

== History ==
The Convent Collegiate School can trace back its original foundation to 1887, but the current school was founded in 1981 by the amalgamation of the Catherine McAuley Grammar School and St Peter's High School Cantley. As a school for the children of local Roman Catholics, it was originally a girls private school until the move in the 1970s, when the School became coeducational.

The School takes its name from Catherine McAuley, founder of the Sisters of Mercy, the order which ran the School until the late 1980s. Born at a time of anti-Catholic bigotry in Ireland, McAuley was deeply touched by the faith of her father who welcomed the poor of Dublin to his door, cared for them and taught them the Catholic faith. James McAuley died when Catherine was a child, and her mother some years later, yet despite the anti-Catholic feelings of the relatives who took Catherine and her brother and sister into their care, Catherine held on to the faith of her father. At 40 years of age McAuley inherited a fortune from a childless couple she had befriended. With the inheritance she bought a property in an affluent part of Dublin, where she was determined to bring the needs of the poor to the attention of her wealthy neighbours. With like-minded women McAuley engaged in the practical work of housing poor women and children and educating them through academic schooling and training in practical skills.

Eventually McAuley and the other women who had joined in her work became a formal religious order taking the name Sisters of Mercy. They were among the first nuns who were founded to work in the community and became nuns following the expansion of Catholic clergy and their role in education and welfare in Ireland after Catholic emancipation. Soon other houses of mercy were founded throughout Ireland, and McAuley then founded the first convents to be built in England since the Protestant Reformation of the sixteenth century.

The work of the Sisterhood of Mercy spread throughout the world after McAuley's death, and her passion for education as a means of improving quality of life was always at the centre of the Sisters' activities, so that schools as far apart as Australia and North America bear the name of Catherine McAuley.

Dr Cullen was sent to Ireland in 1849, Direct by the Pope, 4 years into the great famine -solely to bring the existing Irish Catholic Church into conformity with Roman Catholic canon law and usage, following the emancipation of Catholics. He expanded the Roman Catholic clergy, Roman Catholic doctrine and its role in Ireland within education and welfare, with the Industrial and reformatory school system which also developed into Magdalene laundries and mother and baby home institutions. The sisters of Mercy founded and ran 25 of the 34 girls industrial schools. The same systems were recreated by the Cullenites in the US, Canada, Australia, New Zealand and South Africa – all colonised countries of the British Empire. They arrived in Doncaster in 1887 as part of their Mission to work with the poor as Doncaster was a financially challenged mining town.

The school's former houses represented the patron Saints of the United Kingdom: St George, St Patrick, St David and St Andrew. In September 2013 four houses named Red, Orange, Purple and Yellow were introduced to the school. The colours have also been assigned names: Green house was 'Peter', Yellow house was 'Catherine', Orange house was 'Francis', Red House was 'Romero'. The school no longer has houses. Rather it has separate years for separate age groups defined by colors that act in rotation.

== The convent ==
In Doncaster, a convent of the Sisters of Mercy was established in 1887, and the original Catholic school was founded. After decades of work in the area, The Convent Collegiate School on Rutland street closed (it now Hill House St Mary's Preparatory School) and the sisters had a vision for Catholic education in Doncaster which led to their sacrificial investment in the land and buildings that now house the Upper School and the Convent of Mercy on Warning Tongue Lane. The new 1970 school was named after Catherine McAuley.

== Notable former pupils ==
- Michael Dugher – Born 1975 (Former MP – Barnsley East)
- Johnny Shentall – Born 1978 (Singer – Hear'Say)
- Andrew Gosden – Born 1993; disappeared in London in September 2007.
- Mason Holgate – Born 1996 Footballer for Al-Gharafa
- Maxwell Adedeji – Born 2007 Footballer for Leicester City U18 and Former Finland U17 International.
- Lewis Graham – Born 2007 Footballer for Dearne and District.
