= Disappearance of Andrew Gosden =

2007 disappearance of 14-year-old in London

Andrew Gosden
- Poster produced in 2018, featuring age progression of Gosden at 25 years old on the right.
- Born: 10 July 1993; Doncaster, South Yorkshire, England
- Disappeared: 14 September 2007 (aged 14); London King's Cross railway station, England
- Status: Missing for 19 years, 2 months and 8 days
- Website: helpustofindandrew.weebly.com

On 14 September 2007, Andrew Paul Gosden, a 14-year-old schoolboy from Doncaster, South Yorkshire, disappeared after travelling alone to Central London. That morning, he left home as if heading to school, withdrew £200 from his bank account, and returned home briefly to change his clothes before leaving again without informing his family. His last confirmed sighting was on CCTV at King's Cross station. Despite extensive national appeals, no confirmed sightings have been reported since, and his whereabouts remain unknown.

In December 2021, two men were arrested on suspicion of kidnap and human trafficking in connection with the case. However, both were later eliminated from the investigation and Gosden's disappearance remains unsolved.

== Background ==
Andrew Paul Gosden was born on 10 July 1993, the son of Kevin and Glenys Gosden. He has an older sister, Charlotte. He lived with his family in Balby, a suburb of Doncaster, South Yorkshire. His parents were committed Anglican Christians but had not baptised their children, as they did not want to impose their views on them. Prior to his disappearance, Gosden had not attended church for 18 months. He had been a Cub Scout, but he had stopped participating some months before his disappearance. Gosden's family described him as a "home bird" who rarely left the house and never without saying where he was going. He was known to his family as "Roo".

Gosden was a gifted student with a 100% attendance record at the McAuley Catholic High School. He was on the Young Gifted and Talented Programme, which was designed to enhance the educational development of high-performing pupils. He was expected to achieve As in his GCSE examinations. He was described as a prize-winning mathematician who seemed destined for Cambridge. However, he was described as having a neutral attitude about school, hoping the upcoming school term would provide more of a challenge after having "cruised" through his education so far. He shared little about his school life with his parents and never expressed particular thoughts about any future career.

During the 2006 summer holidays, Gosden attended a two-week residential school at Lancaster University as part of the Young Gifted and Talented Programme. His parents recalled that he returned enthused from his time at the summer school.

Gosden was described as having a small group of friends. However, his family say that he did not socialise with his friends outside of school. He exhibited no signs of depression, with no indications that he had been subjected to bullying.

Gosden was said by his father to be absent-minded, not streetwise, and potentially vulnerable. He was a "deep character" who did not get worked up or moody. His teachers characterised him as a shy, quiet young man who was mature for his age.

Other sources have stated that although Gosden was aged 14 when he disappeared, he looked younger, perhaps about 12, as he was small for his age. He wore strong prescription glasses, was deaf in his left ear, and had a distinctive double ridge on his right ear. He had light brown hair but was planning to dye it black before he disappeared.

Gosden owned mobile phones between the ages of 10 and 12 but rarely used them and often lost them. When his parents offered to replace the lost phones, he stated that he would prefer a new Xbox, and he did not own a phone prior to his disappearance.

He was interested in video games and metal bands.

== Events leading up to the disappearance ==
During the 2007 school summer holidays, Gosden's parents had suggested that he travel alone to London to stay with his grandmother, but he chose not to go.

At the time of his disappearance, Gosden was eight days into the new school year after returning from the summer holidays. In the days leading up to the disappearance, his parents reported that he deviated from his normal routine twice by walking home instead of taking the bus; the route from school to his home was 4 miles (6.4km).

The evening before the disappearance was described by his father as uneventful. The family ate together as usual, and they all washed the dishes afterwards. Gosden spent an hour assembling a jigsaw puzzle on the computer with his father. He then watched comedy programmes on television, including Mock the Week and That Mitchell and Webb Look, with his mother.

== Day of the disappearance ==
On 14 September 2007, the morning of his disappearance, Gosden had difficulty waking up and seemed particularly irritable, which was unusual for him.

At 8:05 am, he left the house and was seen walking across local Westfield Park to his usual bus stop by a family friend. Instead of taking the school bus, he diverted from his usual route and walked to a cash machine, where he withdrew £200 from his bank account. Although Gosden had £214 in his account, the machine only allowed withdrawals in £20 increments, limiting him to £200. He was then recorded on a neighbour's CCTV system returning home.

At home, Gosden placed his uniform in the washing machine and his blazer on the back of his chair. He changed into casual clothes: a black Slipknot T-shirt and black jeans, with a watch on his left wrist. He took a bag embellished with patches of rock and metal bands. He also took his wallet, keys, and a PlayStation Portable (PSP) console. No other possessions were identified as missing, and he had not taken his passport. His father stated that he did not appear to have taken a sweatshirt or coat with him, and had also not taken the charger for his PSP. Despite withdrawing £200 in cash, he left behind around £100 that he had saved from birthdays.

At 8:30 am, he left the house for the final time and was seen heading down Littlemoor Lane, towards Westfield Park on the neighbour's CCTV camera. Gosden then walked to Doncaster railway station and purchased a one-way ticket to London, which cost £31.40. The ticket seller told him that a return ticket cost only 50p more, but he insisted on a single ticket.

At 9:35 am, Gosden was seen boarding the train to King's Cross station alone. A woman reported sitting next to him, describing him as quiet and engrossed in playing his video game. Having failed to attend morning lessons, his teachers tried to contact his parents. The school inadvertently called the parents of a different child, leaving them a voicemail about his disappearance. (Note: The school reportedly dialled the number of the family of a pupil listed immediately above or below Andrew in the attendance register.)

Gosden arrived at King's Cross station at 11:20 am. He was captured on CCTV leaving the main entrance at 11:25 am.

External videos
- CCTV footage from King's Cross station, 14 September 2007. Gosden's last confirmed sighting.

== Disappearance and initial investigation ==
That evening, the family and the same family friend who had seen Gosden in the park that morning sat down for dinner, thinking that he was either in the converted cellar playing video games or in his room doing homework. When they discovered that he was not in the house, they initially thought he could be with a friend or a neighbour and had lost track of time. His parents telephoned his friends, who informed them that Gosden was not there and had not been at school that day. At around 7:00 pm, the police were called. His sister stated: "It was just a complete panic. We initially thought something must have happened on the way to school. When we found that he hadn't even been to school— even tried to go to school— that was even more worrying."

His sister and father scouted Gosden's route to school and areas nearby in case he had been involved in an incident, but found nothing. Within three hours of discovering his disappearance, a missing person leaflet was produced for circulation. His family and friends searched the area until nightfall. That weekend, the police searched the bushes near the Gosdens' home in Doncaster, but found nothing.

King’s Cross old concourse and exits

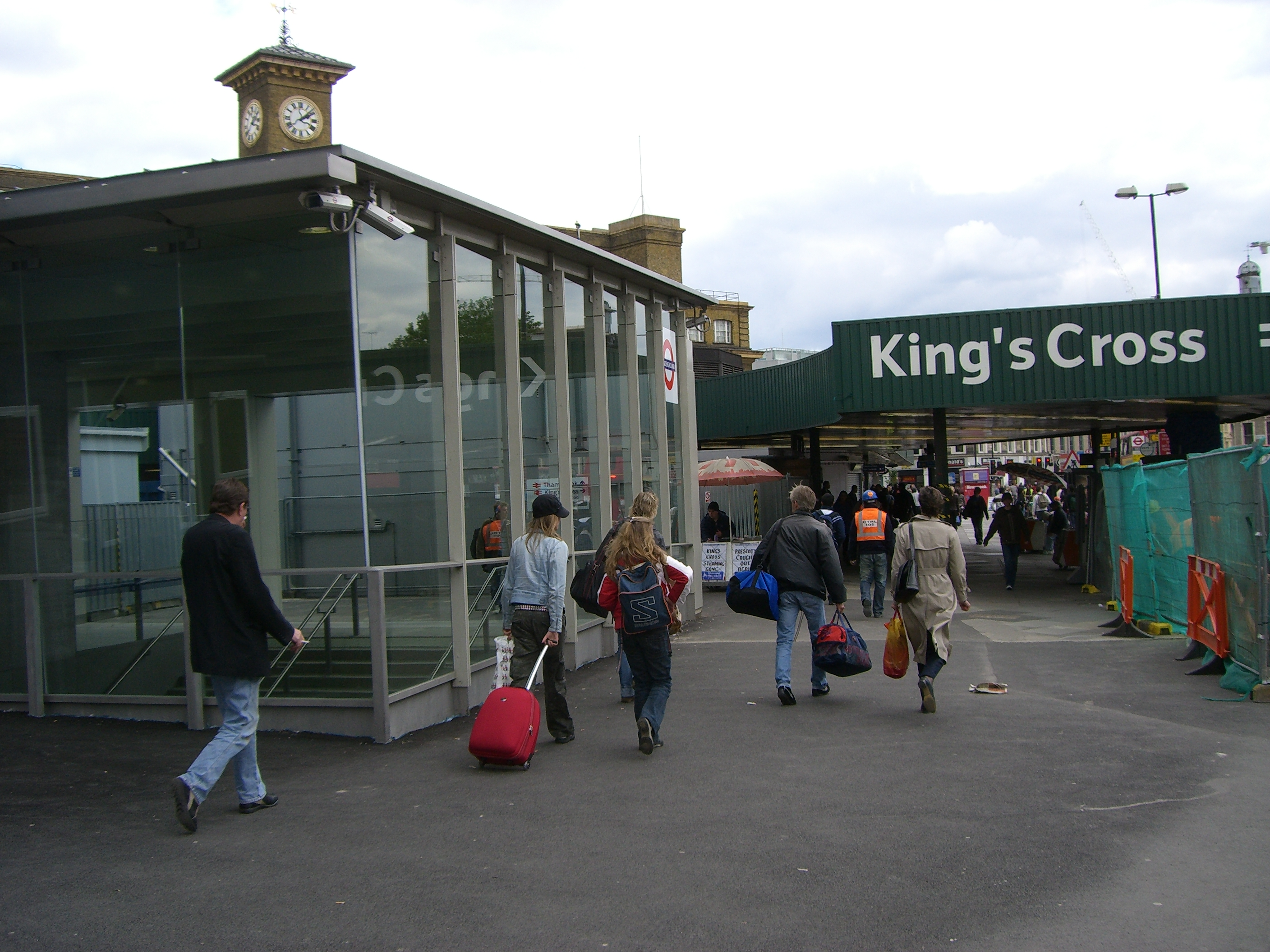
2006

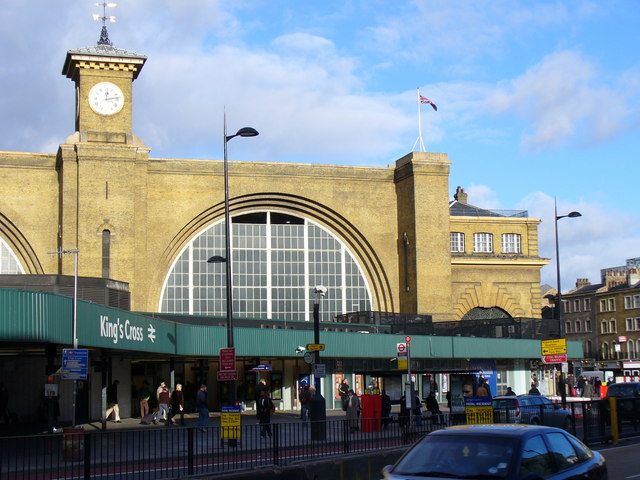
2007

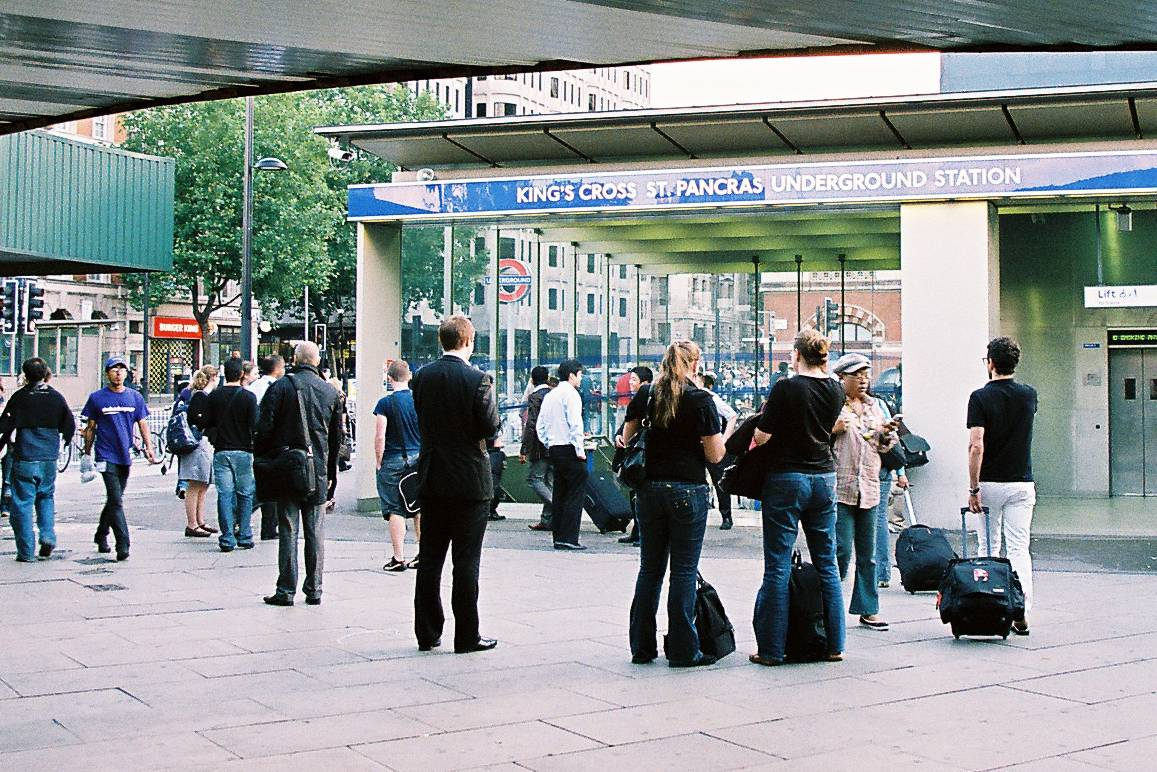
2008

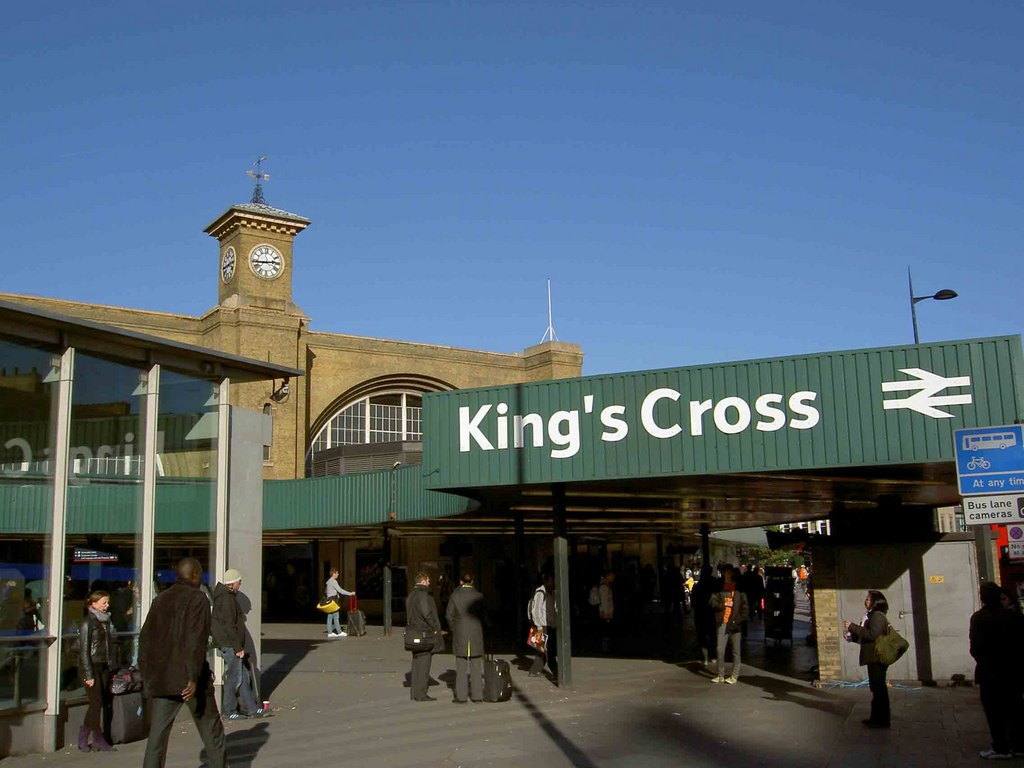
2010

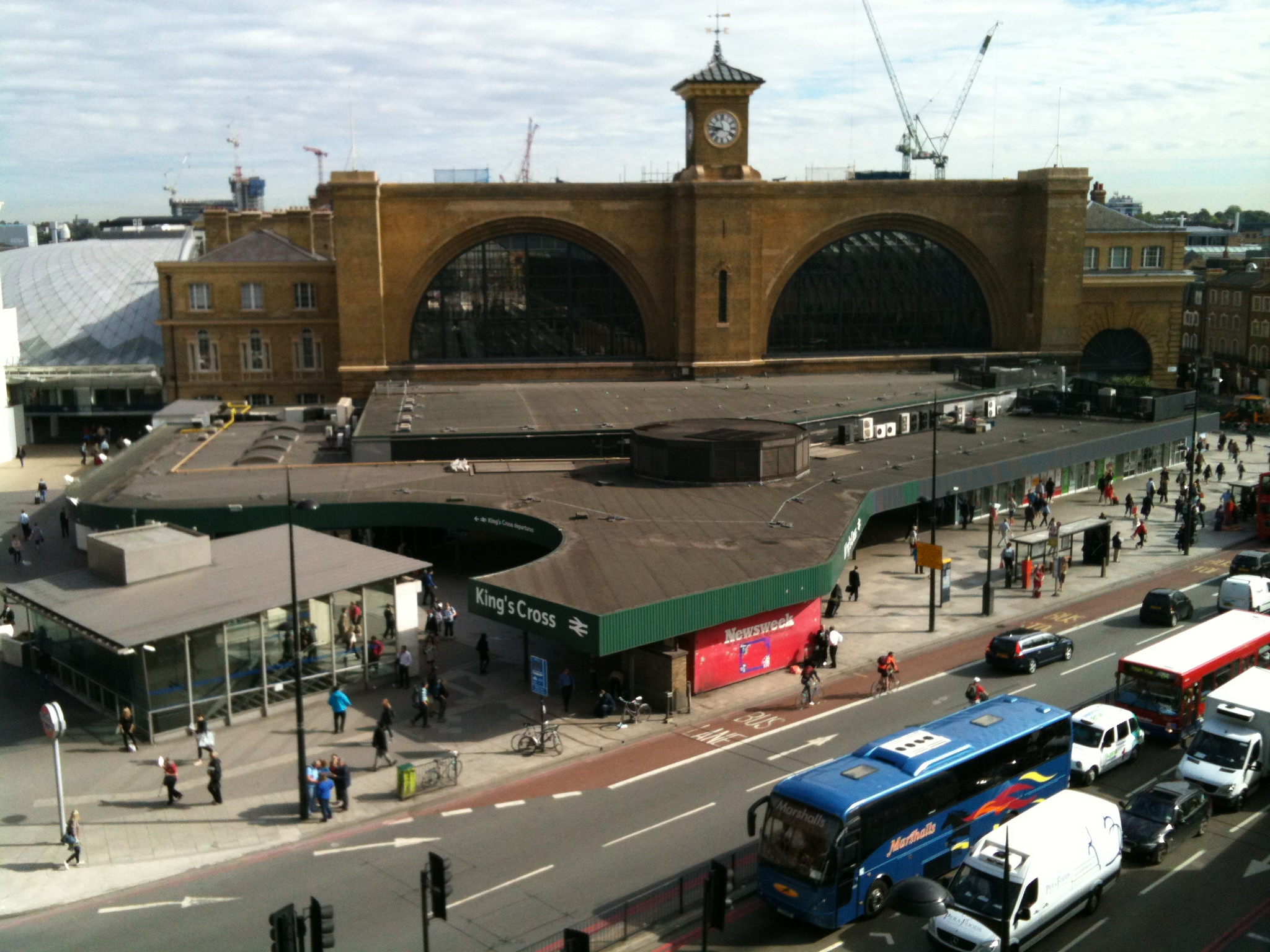
2012

Three days later, after speaking to the woman who had sold him his train ticket, the police confirmed that Gosden had travelled to London. The ticket seller at Doncaster station remembered him because he had refused a return ticket, despite it only costing 50 pence more than a single. His father later stated that the purchase of a single ticket rather than a return did not seem strange to him, as Gosden knew numerous people in London with whom he could have stayed. Initial searches in London focused on the Chislehurst and Sidcup areas, where the family had relatives.

Days after the disappearance, the family travelled to London and handed out flyers and posters in the vicinity of anywhere they felt Gosden would have had an interest in visiting, especially museums and exhibitions.

South Yorkshire Police (SYP) said it asked British Transport Police (BTP) to search the CCTV footage within two days of Gosden going missing, but BTP could not pick him out from the crowds. Three weeks later, CCTV footage at King's Cross was again reviewed by BTP and SYP, who identified him. The CCTV image of Gosden leaving the main concourse at King's Cross was circulated in the media, accompanied by a close-up of his right ear, which has a distinctive double ridge.

External videos
- YouTube videos
- Missing People CCTV Footage: Andrew Gosden
- Missing People CCTV Footage: Andrew Gosden 2

== Subsequent investigations ==
The family and the police investigated the possibility that Gosden had gone to London to meet someone he had met over the Internet; however, there was no evidence for this. He rarely used a computer at home. His father stated that he did not have an email address and had not set up an online account on either his Xbox or his PSP. The police took the computers from his school and Doncaster Library, but their digital forensic investigations found no trace of any activity by him.

Investigators sent the unique serial number of Gosden's PSP to Sony headquarters, who found that there was no record of an account being set up or communication established on the device. The only PC in the house was his sister's laptop, which had been in her possession for only eight weeks. She stated that he did not seem interested in social media or connecting with other people through the Internet, as he "just didn't seem social".

A year after Gosden's disappearance, the head teacher at McAuley Catholic High School, Mary Lawrence, travelled to London with staff and pupils and distributed 15,000 leaflets.

In September 2017, Mick Neville, retired head of the Metropolitan Police's Central Images Unit, drew comparisons between Gosden's disappearance and that of another gifted maths student who disappeared without a trace in London. Alex Sloley was 16 when he disappeared in 2008, less than a year after Gosden. When Sloley disappeared, he was thought to have been on his way to Islington, which is two miles (3.2 km) from King's Cross. Neville stated: "It raises the question on whether there is a serial killer on the prowl? ...the potential links between these cases need to be recognised".

=== Reason for travelling to London ===
After the initial CCTV trail went cold, the investigation moved on to trying to establish why Gosden had decided to go to London. An early theory put forward by the family was that he had decided to go sightseeing. He was known to have enjoyed London and would visit the capital with his family to see his grandparents, aunts, uncles, and family friends who lived there. He also enjoyed visiting London's museums and exhibitions. Travel on buses was free for children at the time of his disappearance. Gosden's sister travelled to London to hand out CVs when she was 14 to gain work experience;— his father speculated that Gosden may have been doing the same. One event identified by his father as a possible reason for his son to have travelled to London was the 2007 YouTube gathering; however, there is no evidence that Gosden attended this event or had any interest in YouTube.

The family also looked into music concerts that he might have gone to London to attend. On the night of his disappearance, Thirty Seconds to Mars played the Brixton Academy and SikTh played a rescheduled farewell show at the Carling Academy. The venue is within walking distance from King's Cross. The SikTh gig was originally scheduled for 4:00 pm on 7 July and was to be the last show with the original vocalist, making it a unique event. Mick Neville believed the SikTh theory was plausible. He appealed for anyone with photos or videos taken at the gig to come forward so that "super recognisers" could scan the images. Neville went on to state: "There is a canal nearby (Regents Canal). It is unclear whether this was ever dredged or checked." Although Gosden was a fan of similar metal bands, there is no evidence that he attended these shows or that he liked these bands.

Finnish band HIM did a promotional signing at the HMV store on Oxford Street on Monday 17 September 2007, and performed an invitation-only show the same evening at the Borderline venue in Soho. The only way to get into this show was by completing various contests and giveaways. This lead was investigated by the family with help from HIM, but it did not produce any meaningful leads. Gosden's father has also stated that he suspected that he might have gone to London to do something for which he felt it was easier to seek forgiveness than ask permission.

Speaking in 2009, Gosden's father speculated on the reason for his disappearance: "Did he decide to do the Reginald Perrin thing, (Note: One of Andrew Gosden's favourite television programmes was The Fall and Rise of Reginald Perrin, in which Leonard Rossiter plays a man who fakes his death in order to start a new life.) and reinvent himself? Or was there something troubling him that he felt he couldn't tell us? In my heart, I still think his disappearance was a spur-of-the-moment thing."

== Criticism of the police investigation ==
Gosden's family were critical of the police's decision to concentrate on investigating the family rather than requesting CCTV footage beyond Kings Cross during the initial stages of the investigation. Gosden's father claimed that the police viewed him as a suspect during the initial stages and they carried out unlawfully recorded interviews aimed at pressuring him into revealing the reason for his son's disappearance, alongside pursuing unhelpful lines of enquiry. He and the wider family were eventually cleared of any involvement.

SYP asked the BTP to search the available CCTV footage within two days of Gosden being reported missing. However, the BTP could not locate him in the crowds, so SYP sent an officer to London to assist with the search; after this, Gosden was spotted. His father claimed that CCTV footage from buses and the adjacent tube station was not requested by the authorities and that the reported sightings of Gosden at a Pizza Hut and at Covent Garden were not followed up.

== Possible sightings ==
An article in The Times written on the first anniversary of Gosden's disappearance, reported that 122 possible sightings had been made across Britain, including 45 from London and 11 from Brighton. Gosden's father said there were two or three sightings within the first week that seemed credible, partly because of the way the witnesses claimed Gosden spoke to them. The family regard the most plausible sighting as one placing Gosden at the Pizza Hut on Oxford Street 2.6 miles (4 km, or about a one hour's walk) from King's Cross, on the day he went missing. They state that this lead was never investigated by police.

There were further unconfirmed sightings on Oxford Street on Monday 17 September, and the next day, when Gosden was said to have been sleeping in a park in Southwark. He was reportedly seen getting off a local train from Waterloo at Mortlake station on 19 September 2007, five days after he disappeared, then possibly walking up Sheen Lane and along Upper Richmond Road. On the same day, it was reported that he appeared to have obtained warmer clothes. A woman reported a potential sighting in Covent Garden on 17 October. She spoke to a boy she believed resembled the missing teenager, but he denied being Gosden.

Later reported locations included a park in Streatham, and sites further afield in South Wales, Birkenhead, and Plymouth. In 2009, two possible sightings were reported: one outside the Natural History Museum and another in a pub in Southend. None could be verified; according to Gosden's father, none were followed up by police, and the woman who reported the Covent Garden sighting was not contacted until six weeks after the disappearance.

== Subsequent events ==
In November 2008, a man visited Leominster police station in Herefordshire, West Midlands. Using the intercom system, he told an officer he had information about Gosden. By the time an officer arrived, he had left. Police later appealed for him to make contact. An individual claiming to be the same man subsequently wrote anonymously to the BBC after the case was featured on The One Show, giving details of a possible sighting in Shrewsbury in November 2008. It has never been confirmed whether it was the same man, or why he did not wait at the station.

In September 2009, the family released age‑progressed images of Gosden at sixteen to mark the second anniversary of his disappearance. They considered the possibility that he may have been struggling with his sexual orientation, noting that children who are gay or lesbian are statistically more likely to run away than those who are heterosexual. In November 2009, Gosden's father appealed to the gay community for help, saying: "We are a pretty open family so have wondered if he was gay or struggling with his sexual identity and found it too awkward to raise. If he is gay, we do not have any issue with it, he is loved unconditionally by both my wife and I and his sister."

In May 2011, the family paid a private company to conduct a sonar search of the River Thames, using technology employed to locate victims and objects at sea, but no trace was found.

In 2016, Gosden's parents appealed for information on the BBC's flagship current affairs television programme Panorama. The following year, to mark the 10th anniversary of his disappearance, the charity Missing People made Gosden the face of its "Find Every Child" campaign, with his imaged displayed on billboards and advertisements throughout the UK.

On 12 September 2017, police made a fresh appeal for information. A statement on the South Yorkshire Police Facebook page said officers were, or had been, investigating requests for similar optical prescriptions to Gosden's, requesting documents from the Passport Office or National Insurance, and circulating his DNA, fingerprints, and dental and health records. The tone suggested police believed Gosden might still be alive. As of 2017, police were undertaking annual checks on John Does in hospital.

In June 2018, the family said someone had reported an online conversation with a user named "Andyroo" living in Lincoln, who claimed their boyfriend had left them and they needed £200 for rent. The username was considered significant because "Roo" was Gosden's family nickname. When the contact offered to send money, the user said they did not have a bank account as they had "left home when they were 14". Police investigated the link but the person was not identified.

In July 2018, to mark Gosden's 25th birthday, two updated age-progression photographs were released. It was also announced that the band Muse would help publicise the campaign. Another age‑progression image was released in October 2019.

The family have not changed the locks on their house, as Gosden was known to have taken his key. His bank account has not been used since he made the withdrawal on the morning of 14 September 2007.

In September 2025, a fresh appeal for information was issued to mark the 18th anniversary of his disappearance.

=== December 2021 arrests ===
On 11 January 2022, South Yorkshire Police stated that on 8 December 2021 detectives had arrested two men, aged 38 and 45, on suspicion of kidnapping and human trafficking. The older man's arrest was also connected with possession of indecent images of children. Both were released under investigation while enquiries continued, and were believed to be the first arrests made in connection with the disappearance. The following day, police announced that numerous devices had been seized for forensic investigation, which could take six months to a year. In a statement, Gosden's father thanked the public for their support and said the family had no information beyond what had been released.

In January 2023, around a year after the arrests, police said the men remained under investigation, and that the seized devices were still being examined. In July 2023, to coincide with media coverage for Gosden's 30th birthday, police issued a new statement saying the arrests had resulted from an anonymous tip‑off, which had not been disclosed in the earlier statements.

In September 2023, police announced that both men had been released without charge and said they were "confident the two men arrested played no part in Gosden's disappearance".

=== Internet misinformation and deepfakes ===
In late 2025, Gosden's father said the family had been targeted by online trolls using AI to generate deepfake videos. He described the experience as "a feeling of absolute powerlessness and helplessness" in what "feels like a hugely dystopian world".

== Media ==
Gosden's disappearance has featured in several media broadcasts and publications:

- Two years after his disappearance, in 2009, Gosden's case was examined in an episode of the Sky TV documentary Missing Children: Lorraine Kelly Investigates.
- An episode of the BBC programme Missing (previously known as Missing Live) that discussed Gosden's case was aired in 2011. It included comments from police officers who investigated the case and interviews with Gosden's parents on their search for him.
- An episode of BBC Panorama, titled "Britain's Missing Young People", aired in July 2016 featuring interviews with Gosden's parents and the vicar who saw Gosden on the day of his disappearance.
- The talk show Loose Women aired an episode in late 2018 concerning Gosden's disappearance.
- An episode of the BBC podcast The Next Episode that was released on BBC Sounds in September 2019 discussed the events and featured an interview with Gosden's father.
- An episode of BBC Crimewatch Live (Roadshow Live Episode 18 – Series 11) was aired in March 2020. It featured both Gosden's father and an appeal for information about him by South Yorkshire Police.

== See also ==
- List of people who disappeared mysteriously (2000–present)
- Disappearance of Alex Sloley – 16-year-old student who disappeared from Central London in 2008
- Disappearance of Ruth Wilson – Unsolved 1995 disappearance of 16-year-old in Surrey
- Disappearance of Lee Boxell – Unsolved 1988 disappearance of 15-year-old
- Disappearance of Martin Allen – Unsolved 1979 case of 15-year-old who disappeared from London
