= Disappearance of Emma Fillipoff =

2012 mysterious disappearance of a Canadian woman

Emma Fillipoff
- Born: January 6, 1986 (age 40); Perth, Ontario, Canada
- Disappeared: November 28, 2012; Victoria, British Columbia, Canada
- Status: Missing for 13 years, 8 months and 26 days
- Parents: James Fillipoff (father); Shelley Fillipoff (mother)

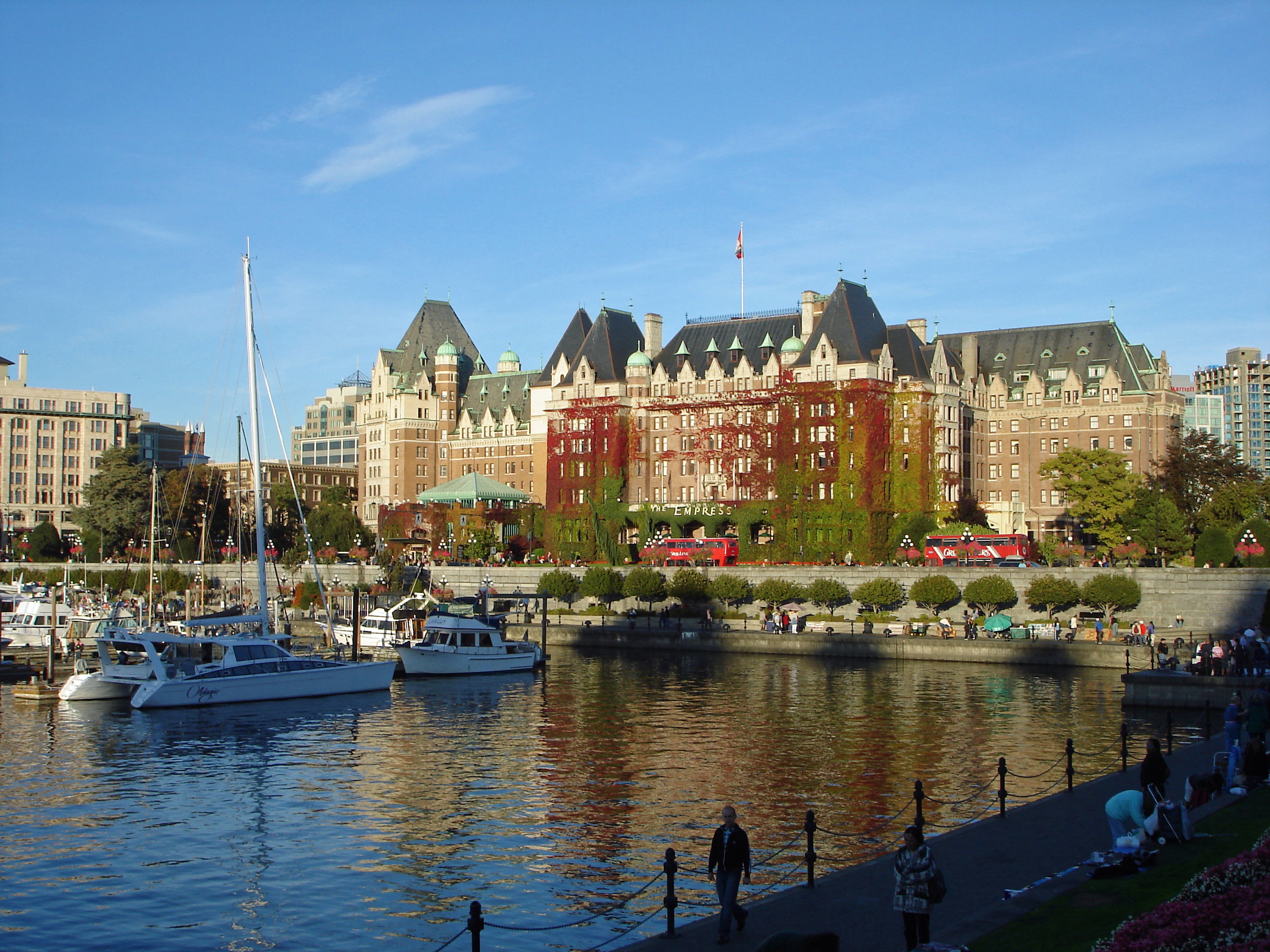
The Empress in Victoria, British Columbia, Canada.

Emma Fillipoff (born January 6, 1986) is a Canadian woman who has been missing since November 28, 2012. Fillipoff was last seen in front of the Empress Hotel in Victoria, British Columbia, at the age of 26.

== Disappearance ==
Emma Fillipoff was last seen in the immediate vicinity of the Empress Hotel in Victoria, British Columbia, between 7:15pm and 8:00pm on November 28, 2012. She was observed being interviewed by officers from the Victoria Police Department (VicPD). Her red 1993 Mazda MPV was later found in the parking lot of the Chateau Victoria with almost all her belongings in it, including her passport, library card, digital camera, clothes, a pillow, assorted ornaments, laptop and recently borrowed library books. It is believed Fillipoff used the van as storage. She spoke with Chateau Victoria staff at 7:00am on the morning of her disappearance.

In June 2018, a man reported that in the early morning following Fillipoff's disappearance, he had picked up a young woman in distress matching her description in nearby Esquimalt.

== Timeline ==
=== Pre-disappearance ===
Fillipoff arrived in Victoria in the fall of 2011 from Perth, Ontario. She had brief employment at the Red Fish Blue Fish seafood restaurant in Victoria's Inner Harbour. Since the work was seasonal, Fillipoff left the job on October 31, 2012. She assured co-workers she would be back in the spring.

In what police believe was preparation to move back to Ontario, Fillipoff hired a tow-truck on November 21 in order to move her Mazda from Sooke to the Chateau Victoria parking garage. Unbeknownst to her family, Fillipoff had stayed at the Sandy Merriman House women's shelter on and off since February. On November 23, Fillipoff was captured on security footage at the Victoria YMCA, entering, then leaving, then entering multiple times as if possibly avoiding someone on the outside.

In the days preceding her disappearance, Fillipoff had phoned her mother in Ontario, asking if she could come home. Each time her tone would quickly change and Fillipoff would then ask her mother not to come. On the final call, her mother became aware that Fillipoff had been staying at the Sandy Merriman House, and even though Fillipoff had asked her not to come, she made plans to fly out immediately. Fillipoff's last words to her mother were, "I don't know how I can face you." Her mother arrived at Sandy Merriman House at about 11:00pm on the 28th, three hours after Fillipoff had been last seen by police at the Empress Hotel.

Early on the day of November 28, Fillipoff had been captured on security footage purchasing a pre-paid cell phone at a 7-Eleven location on Government Street. The video showed her hesitating in departing the store, seemingly checking the street outside. She returned to the 7-Eleven to buy a pre-paid credit card for $200. Reportedly, she left the Sandy Merriman House at about 6:00pm that day. Soon after, Fillipoff hailed a taxi and asked to be taken to the Victoria International Airport; however, she soon exited the taxi for lack of adequate fare, even though she had the $200 prepaid card.

Minutes later, Fillipoff was seen walking barefoot in front of the Empress Hotel. An acquaintance of hers, Dennis Quay, called 9-1-1 to say a woman was in severe distress outside the hotel. Victoria police arrived, took Fillipoff's name, and spent forty-five minutes speaking with her. Deciding that she was not a threat to herself or anyone else, they released her. Until a report surfaced in June 2018, no one reported seeing her since 8:00pm that night. Later that evening, police met Fillipoff's mother at Sandy Merriman House; by midnight Fillipoff was classified as a missing person.

=== Post-disappearance ===
Initially, police stated that Fillipoff had last been seen "with friends several blocks away on Burdett Avenue between Blanshard and Quadra streets." Investigators explored more than 200 leads, turning up minimal information. Most evidence indicates she was planning to return home to Ottawa, but there was no proof that she ever left Victoria. The cell phone she bought had never been activated.

Fillipoff's credit card was allegedly found on the side of the road near the Juan de Fuca Community Centre, north of where she disappeared. It was found by a stranger, whose use of the card to purchase cigarettes was tracked by police.

=== Emma Fillipoff's writings ===
Fillipoff wrote copious poems about her time in Victoria. None of it indicated that she was being stalked. Even though some of it indicated she was depressed, experts who appeared on The Fifth Estate said the writing did not have the hallmarks of suicidal ideation. According to Fillipoff's mother, however, the Sandy Merriman staff claimed that Emma Fillipoff "required both physical and medical intervention."

=== Unrelated charges against mother and brother ===
In March 2016, Fillipoff's mother and brother were charged with money laundering, as well as drug and weapons offenses, after an Ontario Provincial Police investigation. Shelley Fillipoff insisted the charges had nothing to do with the disappearance of Emma Fillipoff, saying "the one has nothing to do with the other."

In November 2016, all charges were dropped against Shelley Fillipoff, clearing her of any involvement.

== Leads ==
The Campbell River Courier-Islander newspaper reported in May 2014 that Gastown, Vancouver, business owners Joel and Lori Sellen witnessed a man in their store throwing out a $25,000 missing persons reward poster for Fillipoff. The pair reported that the man said, "It's one of those missing persons posters, except she's not missing, she's my girlfriend and she ran away 'cause she hates her parents." The owners immediately called the police. Although security video captured an image of the man, he is yet to be identified as of 2024.

In the summer of 2018, a witness named William came forward with new information about encountering a woman the morning after Fillipoff's disappearance. The woman matched her general description and demeanor. The report resulted in the organization of a search of the View Royal area of Victoria in December 2018. The search turned up no additional clues, but another search was planned for 2019. Victoria media drew information from Kimberly Bordage's podcast, The Search for Emma Fillipoff.

On November 29, 2021, the ninth anniversary of her disappearance, police released additional images of Emma as well as pictures of art that she created hoping it would create new leads. In November 2022, police released an age-progression image of Fillipoff, again in hopes of generating new leads.

=== Green Shirt Man ===
In November 2023, a new initiative to find the man who tore down Fillipoff's poster was launched, including a police sketch of the man. As he was caught on the store's security camera wearing a distinctive green shirt, he has been sometimes referred to as the "Green Shirt Man". Victoria police now wish to contact the man.

== Media coverage ==
Emma Fillipoff's disappearance has received extensive print/web coverage both in Canada and abroad.

In 2013, Fillipoff's disappearance was the subject of an episode of the Canadian Broadcasting Corporation television program, The Fifth Estate titled 'Finding Emma'.

The podcasts True Crime Garage profiled her case in 2016 and The Vanished in 2017. Vice covered the disappearance in 2017.

In 2020, Emma Fillipoff's disappearance was the subject of a long form series by the Canadian audio documentary series The Night Time Podcast titled 'Emma Fillipoff is Missing'. This series features interviews with her mother Shelley, many of her closest friends, and the one time suspect Julien. This series was the featured podcast on Apple Podcasts for the week of January 12, 2020, and appeared in the top ten of Canada's podcast charts for several days.

Barefoot in the Night, a six-hour docuseries, is a behind-the-scenes look at the effort to find Emma, covering the timeline, tips, sightings, and witness accounts. It chronicles Emma's life, her mysterious disappearance from Victoria, BC in 2012, and includes interviews with those close to Emma, those involved in the official investigation, and the many other persons linked to the case. It will highlight the efforts to crowd-source the investigation and reveal the myriad ways the public has continued to contribute to the search. A release date for the film is yet to be announced.

As of November 28, 2023 three previews have been released for the docuseries and can be viewed at Bayberry Films. For the 11th anniversary of her going missing, Victoria Police issued a citizen's appeal and once again highlighted Fillipoff's website to bring awareness to the case.

== See also ==
- List of people who disappeared mysteriously (2000–present)
