= List of people who disappeared mysteriously (1990s) =

This is a list of people who disappeared mysteriously during the 1990s or whose deaths or exact circumstances thereof are not substantiated. Many people who disappear end up declared presumed dead and some of these people were possibly subjected to forced disappearance.

This list is a general catch-all; for specialty lists, see Lists of people who disappeared.

== 1990 ==
Date	Person(s)	Age when disappeared	Missing from	Circumstances	Refs.
5 February 1990	Ames Glover	5 months	London, England	Glover, a 5-month-old boy, disappeared from the back seat of his father's car in London, England. He has not been found, and no charges have been brought.	
18 March 1990	Dannette Millbrook	15	Augusta, Georgia, U.S.	Dannette and Jeannette Millbrook are fraternal twins last seen by a gas-station clerk at the Pump-N-Shop gas station on the corner of 12th Street and Martin Luther King Jr. Boulevard in Augusta, Georgia, around 4:30 p.m. Their case was closed in 1991, and later reopened in 2013.	
18 March 1990	Jeannette Millbrook	15	Augusta, Georgia, U.S.	Dannette and Jeannette Millbrook are fraternal twins last seen by a gas-station clerk at the Pump-N-Shop gas station on the corner of 12th Street and Martin Luther King Jr. Boulevard in Augusta, Georgia, around 4:30 p.m. Their case was closed in 1991, and later reopened in 2013.	
10 April 1990	Teddy Wang	56	British Hong Kong	Chinese businessman and founder of the Chinachem Group, Teddy Wang was kidnapped on 10 April 1990, and has not been seen since.	
14 April 1990	Alain Kan	45	Paris, France	Alain Kan is a French musician last seen at the Rue de la Pompe Parisian metro station in Paris on 14 April 1990.	
20 April 1990	Christopher Kerze	17	Eagan, Minnesota, U.S.	Kerze disappeared after indicating he would return home by 6 p.m., but never did. His car was found two days later in Grand Rapids.	
24 May 1990	Paige Renkoski	30	Fowlerville, Michigan, U.S.	Renkoski was last seen on the shoulder of Interstate 96 talking to two men next to a maroon-colored minivan. Hours later, the 1986 Oldsmobile she had been driving was found idling, with her shoes and purse inside.	
June 1990	Peter Abraham Siems	65	Orange Springs, Florida, U.S.	In June 1990, Siems left Jupiter, Florida, for Arkansas. On July 4, 1990, his car was found in Orange Springs, Florida. Tyria Moore and Aileen Wuornos were seen abandoning the car, and Wuornos' handprint was found on the interior door handle. His body was never found.	
16 June 1990	Trevaline Evans	52	Llangollen, Wales	Evans vanished after leaving a note on the front door of her antiques shop, saying she would be "back in two minutes".	
11 July 1990	Sarah MacDiarmid	23	Seaford, Victoria, Australia	MacDiarmid was last seen late on the night of 11 July 1990, in the parking lot of Kananook railway station. Evidence found near her car suggested a struggle, and foul play is suspected. Police have interviewed two potential suspects, but she officially remains missing.	
15 August 1990	Eugene John Hebert	66	Sri Lanka	American-born Jesuit missionary Hebert went missing on 15 August 1990, on his way to the eastern city of Batticaloa from a nearby town of Valaichchenai. His disappearance remains a mystery.	
c. 1990	Licorice McKechnie	44–45	Sacramento, California, U.S.	McKechnie, a musician and former member of the Scottish folk group The Incredible String Band, was last reported to be living in California. As of 1990, her last whereabouts have been unknown.	

== 1991 ==
Date	Person(s)	Age when disappeared	Missing from	Circumstances	Refs.
20 January 1991	Tito Mendes	13	Altamira, Pará, Brazil	Mendes disappeared after swimming in a stream. Before disappearing, a witness saw him with an unknown man.	
18 March 1991	Thomas Gibson	2	Azalea, Oregon, U.S.	Gibson disappeared from his front yard in Azalea, Oregon, after his father Larry, a sheriff's deputy, left for a jog. Larry was charged with second-degree murder in Thomas's case, and was convicted of manslaughter in 1995, serving less than one year in prison. Thomas's remains and whereabouts are unknown.	
24 March 1991	Michael Dunahee	4	Victoria, British Columbia, Canada	Dunahee disappeared from a school playground. His parents were nearby, but no witnesses to his presumed abduction have been identified, and no subsequent confirmed sightings of him have been made.	
19 June 1991	Tanong Po-arn	55	Bangkok, Thailand	Thai labor leader Tanong disappeared after his car was found abandoned in Bangkok's Rat Burana District, shortly after a military coup. Repeated inquiries from his family to the police and other government agencies received no reply, and his fate remains unknown.	
19 July 1991	Jared Negrete	12	San Gorgonio Mountain, California, U.S.	Negrete disappeared from a Boy Scout expedition on 19 July 1991, after being lost from his group. A search party was launched. Rescue teams following his footprints found candy wrappers and his disposable camera. Most pictures on the filmstrip depicted the surrounding landscape, with only the boy's eyes and nose visible in the last photo.	
24 July 1991	Ben Needham	1	Kos, Greece	Needham, a 21-month-old boy, disappeared while his grandparents were renovating a farmhouse. Despite numerous sighting reports over the years, he has not been found. Family members say they believe the child was kidnapped with the intention of selling him for adoption, or to child traffickers. Others familiar with the case consider the theory of an accident more likely. In 2016, excavations conducted nearby led investigators to informally conclude that Ben died in an accident that day on a construction site. This theory has been substantiated by reports of blood discovered on a toy car and sandal believed to have belonged to the toddler, which were discovered in 2017.	
27 December 1991	Amanda Campbell	4	Fairfield, California	Campbell disappeared off the street while riding her bike in the western suburbs of Fairfield. Several persons-of-interest and suspects have been identified since her presumed abduction by a stranger, although Campbell has never been found.	

== 1992 ==
Date	Person(s)	Age when disappeared	Missing from	Circumstances	Refs.
5 January 1992	Kelly Dae Wilson	17	Gilmer, Texas, U.S.	Wilson's car was left abandoned with flat tire in the parking lot of the video store where she worked; bank surveillance footage appears to show her dropping her paycheck in the bank's deposit box. Foul play is suspected, but no one has been charged, nor has Wilson been found.	
23 April 1992	Virginia Guerrero	14	Reinosa, Spain	Guerrero and Torres are two teenage girls who suddenly vanished under unclear circumstances, while hitchhiking from Reinosa to their hometown Aguilar de Campoo after partying in a nightclub.	
23 April 1992	Manuela Torres	13	Reinosa, Spain	Guerrero and Torres are two teenage girls who suddenly vanished under unclear circumstances, while hitchhiking from Reinosa to their hometown Aguilar de Campoo after partying in a nightclub.	
7 June 1992	Sherrill Levitt	47	Springfield, Missouri, U.S.	Levitt, her daughter Streeter, and friend McCall, known collectively as the Springfield Three, disappeared from Levitt's home on 7 June 1992. Streeter and McCall had graduated from Kickapoo High School the day before, and had arrived at Levitt's home at around 2:00 a.m. after a graduation party. It is being investigated as an apparent triple disappearance.	
7 June 1992	Suzie Streeter	19	Springfield, Missouri, U.S.	Levitt, her daughter Streeter, and friend McCall, known collectively as the Springfield Three, disappeared from Levitt's home on 7 June 1992. Streeter and McCall had graduated from Kickapoo High School the day before, and had arrived at Levitt's home at around 2:00 a.m. after a graduation party. It is being investigated as an apparent triple disappearance.	
7 June 1992	Stacy McCall	18	Springfield, Missouri, U.S.	Levitt, her daughter Streeter, and friend McCall, known collectively as the Springfield Three, disappeared from Levitt's home on 7 June 1992. Streeter and McCall had graduated from Kickapoo High School the day before, and had arrived at Levitt's home at around 2:00 a.m. after a graduation party. It is being investigated as an apparent triple disappearance.	
14 June 1992	Helena Andersson	21–22	Mariestad, Sweden	Andersson vanished mysteriously after going to a friend's housewarming party in Töreboda. While her body has never been found, traces of blood and other items indicated that she was killed, and her case is still under investigation.	
27 August 1992	Leigh Occhi	13	Tupelo, Mississippi, U.S.	Thirteen-year-old Occhi disappeared from her home during Hurricane Andrew. Her mother returned to their residence to find blood in various locations of the house, but Occhi was nowhere to be seen. Her whereabouts are unknown.	
1 September 1992	Jarosław Ziętara	23	Poland	Ziętara, a Polish journalist, disappeared on 1 September 1992 on his way to work, and is believed to have been kidnapped and murdered.	
15 September 1992	Boutros Khawand	51–52	Horch Tabet, Lebanon	A cofounder of the military council of the Kataeb Party, Khawand was kidnapped by up to ten individuals close to his Horch Tabet home on 15 September 1992. His fate remains unknown.	
9 October 1992	Taif Ajba	53	Sukhumi, Georgia	Ajba, an Abkhaz poet, disappeared on 9 October 1992, and is believed to have been tortured and shot dead. The reports are unconfirmed, and the case remains unsolved.	
27 December 1992	Maurício Farias de Souza	12	Altamira, Pará, Brazil	Maurício Farias de Souza disappeared after being seen with a man on a red bicycle.	
28 December 1992	Steven Clark	23	Saltburn-by-the-sea, North Yorkshire, England	Clark, a 23‑year‑old man disappeared after entering a public toilet in Saltburn‑by‑the‑Sea in 1992.	

== 1993 ==
Date	Person(s)	Age when disappeared	Missing from	Circumstances	Refs.
2 January 1993	Vernon Jones	23	New York City, United States	Vernon Jones is an American actor who on 2 January 1993 disappeared from New York City, New York and has not been seen since.	
23 January 1993	Renan Santos de Souza	9	Altamira, Pará, Brazil	Renan Santos de Souza was last seen near the Chingu River with two men.	
26 March 1993	Annie McCarrick	26	Dublin, Ireland	McCarrick, an American woman, disappeared on 26 March 1993 after an afternoon of running errands in Dublin.	
24 July 1993	Manuel Schadwald	12	Berlin, Germany	Schadwald, a German schoolboy, disappeared on 24 July 1993 in Berlin, and is believed to have been kidnapped and murdered by a pedophile ring.	
2 August 1993	Katheryne Eggleston	22	Portland, Oregon, U.S.	Eggleston, a recent college graduate, disappeared in the afternoon from an administrative building in northeast Portland, while attending a business appointment for her job at a telecommunications company. Her car was discovered abandoned 9 miles (14 km) away, but she has not been seen since.	
26 August 1993	Edward Fonder III	80	Springfield Township, Bucks County, Pennsylvania	The father of convicted murderer Mary Jane Fonder who disappeared, and has not been seen since.	
31 August 1993	Tanja Groen	18	Maastricht, Netherlands	Tanja disappeared after leaving a Student Association party on her bicycle to her housesit in Gronsveld. There has been no trace of her, or her bike, since.	
August 1993	Maarit Haantie	40	Hausjärvi, Finland	40-year-old Maarit Haantie disappeared in August 1993. She is suspected to have fallen victim to an unidentified serial killer; namely, the one responsible for the Hausjärvi Gravel Pit Murders. Authorities searched for Haantie's body, though it was never recovered.	
August 1993	Wopko Jensma	52	Johannesburg, South Africa	Jensma, a South African poet and artist, disappeared without a trace from Johannesburg in August 1993.	
29 December 1993	Pierre Bianconi	31	Bastia, France	Pierre Bianconi is a French professional footballer who mysteriously disappeared from his hometown of Bastia on 29 December 1993 and has not been seen since.	

== 1994 ==
Date	Person(s)	Age when disappeared	Missing from	Circumstances	Refs.
6 January 1994	Ylenia Carrisi	23	New Orleans, Louisiana, U.S.	Carrisi, an Italian celebrity and daughter of singers Albano Carrisi and Romina Power, disappeared on 6 January 1994 during a vacation in New Orleans.	
9 May 1994	Cleashindra Hall	18	Pine Bluff, Arkansas, U.S.	Hall disappeared after leaving her school job, and her disappearance was ruled as suspicious.	
2 June 1994	Carl-Eric Björkegren	73	Viken, Sweden	Björkegren disappeared from his residence in Viken, hours before he was to board a plane to Stockholm, where his lawyer Henning Sjöström and daughter were waiting for him in a pre-booked room at the Grand Hôtel.	
10 June 1994	Sukhwinder Singh Bhatti	c. 43	Punjab, India	Bhatti, a criminal defense attorney in Sangrur district, was last seen on 10 June 1994 in the custody of Indian security forces. His case remains unsolved.	
19 July 1994	Ernst Priesner	60	Garmisch-Partenkirchen, Germany	Austrian biologist Priesner went missing on 19 July 1994, after failing to return from a research trip in the Garmisch-Partenkirchen mountains.	
27 August 1994	Larisa Dumansky	29	Sioux Falls, South Dakota	Larisa Dumansky, a Ukrainian immigrant disappeared on 27 August 1994 from Sioux Falls, South Dakota and has not been seen since.	
5 November 1994	Revelle Balmain	22	Kingsford, Sydney, Australia	Balmain, an Australian model, dancer and escort, disappeared on 5 November 1994 from the Sydney suburb of Kingsford, and is believed to have been murdered.	
12 November 1994	Abani Chakraborty	53	Guwahati, Northeast India	Chakraborty, an Assamese humanitarian poet of late-20th-century Assamese literature, went out for an evening walk and did not return.	
8 December 1994	Jacobo Grinberg	47	Mexico	Mexican scientist, writer, and psychologist Grinberg disappeared on 8 December 1994, and has not been seen since.	

== 1995 ==
Date	Person(s)	Age when disappeared	Missing from	Circumstances	Refs.
January 1995	Dor Bahadur Bista	68	Karnali Province, Nepal	Bista, an anthropologist from Nepal, disappeared from Jumla District in January 1995.	
1 February 1995	Richey Edwards	27	Cardiff, Wales	Richey Edwards, the guitarist and primary lyricist for the Welsh rock band Manic Street Preachers, disappeared on 1 February 1995 - shortly before he was to fly to the United States for a promotional tour. His car was found abandoned on 17 February 1995 at the Aust service area adjacent to the Severn Bridge, which is a location notorious for suicides. Edwards had a history of self injury, and had received treatment for alcoholism, anorexia nervosa, and depression in the years leading up to his disappearance. He was declared dead in November 2008.	
15 April 1995	Fred Cuny	50	Chechnya, Russia	Cuny, his team of two Russian Red Cross doctors, and an interpreter disappeared while seeking to negotiate a ceasefire in April 1995. A search to find him was conducted, and he was believed to have been murdered, yet nothing was found.	
14 May 1995	Chadrel Rinpoche	55	Chengdu, China	Chadrel Rinpoche, a Gelug lama of Tibet, was abducted and placed under arbitrary house arrest by CCP officials. He reportedly died from a suspicious poisoning in 2011, but his remains have never been recovered, and reports from China allege his status is unknown.	
17 May 1995	Gedhun Choekyi Nyima	6	Lhari County, Tibet Autonomous Region, China	Nyima, a Tibetan boy recognized by the 14th Dalai Lama as being the 11th Panchen Lama, a reincarnation of the 10th Panchen Lama, has not been seen since 17 May 1995. He is supposedly alive and well in China, but the Chinese government will not allow this to be confirmed in person. As a result, his whereabouts are considered unknown.	
9 June 1995	Morgan Nick	6	Alma, Arkansas, U.S.	Morgan Nick was abducted by an unknown white male while she was playing at a ballpark.	
27 June 1995	Jodi Huisentruit	27	Mason City, Iowa, U.S.	Huisentruit, a KIMT television news anchor, was abducted from outside her apartment while on her way to work. She was declared legally dead in 2001.	
1 July 1995	Erin Marie Gilbert	24	Girdwood, Alaska, U.S.	Gilbert disappeared from the Girdwood Forest Fair while accompanying a date; the man stated he walked over two hours searching for a friend's home after his car battery died, and that Gilbert was missing when he returned.	
28 July 1995	Andrew Shumack	25	Grozny, Chechnya, Russia	American freelance journalist Shumack was last seen when he left Grozny, Chechnya, and is believed to be dead.	
9 November 1995	Josephine Dullard	21	Moone, County Kildare, Ireland	An Irish woman who disappeared at age 21 in November 1995. Dullard was last known to have phoned a friend at a phone box in Moone to request if she could stay the night at her home in Carlow, explaining she missed the last bus to her home; she interrupted this call to explain she had "just got a lift" from an unknown individual. Dullard has not been seen or heard from again. Police strongly believe she was murdered.	
27 November 1995	Ruth Wilson	16	Box Hill, England	Wilson, a British teenager, disappeared after taking a taxi to a popular local beauty spot at Box Hill, Surrey. Although theories including suicide, abduction, and running away have been floated, none of them have been proven.	
15 December 1995	John Markley	36	Bristol Township, Ohio	The Markley's vanished from their home in December 1995, with their gun removed from its case, papers from their safe, and other items missing. The couple was last seen at a bank in Bloomfield, Ohio, cashing a $1,000 check, with an unidentified man sitting in the passenger seat of their vehicle. John's 1990 Chevrolet truck was found abandoned on Elm Rd in Warren, Ohio, their cellphones were found inside the vehicle and the keys were missing. A man named Steven Durst contacted the family in 1996, claiming he was holding the couple for ransom and demanded money, however police later discovered he has no connection to the incident and was later sentenced 4-10 years in prison for extortion.	
15 December 1995	Shelly Markley	32	Bristol Township, Ohio		

== 1996 ==
Date	Person(s)	Age when disappeared	Missing from	Circumstances	Refs.
12 January 1996	Tin Song Sheng	7	Klang, Selangor, Malaysia	Tin Song Sheng, a seven-year-old Chinese boy disappeared while waiting for the bus to return home after embarking second week of his primary school at the Taman Rashna Chinese Primary School in Klang. He was seen leaving the school with an unidentified middle-aged Chinese woman and vanished. He has not been found despite nationwide searching.	
1 June 1996	Ruslan Labazanov	29	Tolstoy-Yurt, Chechnya, Russia	Labazanov was a notorious crime boss of the Chechen mafia and head of a Chechen armed faction, held by some as an example of a modern abrek (bandit hero). On 1 June 1996, it was reported that Labazanov was killed together with a bodyguard at the village of Tolstoy-Yurt, 15 kilometres north of Grozny. His body was never found.	
12 June 1996	Kalpana Chakma	Unknown	Lallyagona, Bangladesh	Human rights activist and feminist Kalpana Chakma was abducted from her native village by Bangladesh Army soldiers on 12 June 1996, along with her two brothers. She has never been located, and was presumably killed.	
7 July 1996	Yukari Yokoyama	4	Ota, Gunma, Japan	Yokoyama went missing from a pachinko parlor on 7 July 1996, in Ota, Gunma. It is believed she was kidnapped by a 30 to 50-year-old man, and is also believed to have been one of the cases that make up the North Kanto Serial Young Girl Kidnapping and Murder Case.	
16 July 1996	Susan Walsh	36	Nutley, New Jersey, U.S.	Walsh left her apartment to use a payphone, and has not been seen since. Her disappearance was widely publicized, after several newspapers and media outlets published articles concluding that her disappearance was potentially linked to the Russian mafia, as well as New York City's underground vampire community, both subjects that Walsh had investigated while writing for The Village Voice.	
10 August 1996	Angela Celentano	3	Monte Faito, Castellammare di Stabia, Naples, Italy	Angela Celentano, a 3-year-old girl went missing on 10 August 1996.	
23 August 1996	Fiona Pender	25	Tullamore, County Offaly, Ireland	Fiona Pender, an Irish woman, disappeared on 23 August 1996 from Tullamore, County Offaly and has not been seen since.	
29 September 1996	Melanie Ethier	15	New Liskeard, Ontario, Canada	Ethier mysteriously disappeared while walking home from a friend's house. Despite a decades-long investigation, her remains have never been found, and no suspect has been charged, although police suspect foul play.	
2 November 1996	Damien Nettles	16	Cowes, Isle of Wight, England	Nettles disappeared on 2 November 1996 during a night out with a friend. Five men were arrested in 2011, but by 2016, no charges had been brought.	
9 November 1996	Adam O'Brien	14	Torbay, Newfoundland, Canada	Adam, Trevor, and Mitchell O'Brien are brothers missing from Torbay, Newfoundland and Labrador, who were allegedly abducted by their father.	
9 November 1996	Trevor O'Brien	11	Torbay, Newfoundland, Canada	Adam, Trevor, and Mitchell O'Brien are brothers missing from Torbay, Newfoundland and Labrador, who were allegedly abducted by their father.	
9 November 1996	Mitchell O'Brien	4	Torbay, Newfoundland, Canada	Adam, Trevor, and Mitchell O'Brien are brothers missing from Torbay, Newfoundland and Labrador, who were allegedly abducted by their father.	
27 December 1996	Patrick Warren	11	Solihull, England	Warren and Spencer are two English schoolboys who mysteriously disappeared on 27 December 1996. The case remains open, and is one of the more notorious cases of missing children in UK history.	
27 December 1996	David Spencer	13	Solihull, England	Warren and Spencer are two English schoolboys who mysteriously disappeared on 27 December 1996. The case remains open, and is one of the more notorious cases of missing children in UK history.	

== 1997 ==
Date	Person(s)	Age when disappeared	Missing from	Circumstances	Refs.
March 30 1997	James Gramling	20	Augusta, Georgia, United States	On the afternoon of March 30, 1997, 20-year-old James Clyde Gramling disappeared after leaving his southern Richmond County, Georgia residence to ride his 1997 Honda TRX300 four-wheeler to a male friend's home. A five-minute drive away, Gramling had told his parents he would call them if he was to return home late. Gramling never returned home that night and has not been seen or heard from since. Gramling was declared legally dead in 2002.	
22 June 1997	Marion Barter	51	Southport, Queensland, Australia	Barter, an Australian mother and teacher, disappeared from Southport, Queensland on 22 June 1997, and has not been seen since.	
23 June 1997	Kristen Modafferi	18	San Francisco, California, U.S.	North Carolina native Modafferi was living in San Francisco for the summer to attend classes at the University of California, Berkeley. On the afternoon of 23 June 1997, she left her job at a coffee shop in Crocker Galleria mall in the Financial District. She was seen by co-workers talking to a blonde woman in the mall around 45 minutes later. She has not been seen since.	
24 July 1997	Amy Wroe Bechtel	24	Lander, Wyoming, U.S.	On the morning of 24 July 1997, the 24-year-old left her apartment to run errands. At 2:30 p.m., she was seen at a photo shop; this is the last confirmed sighting of her. It is believed she left the photo shop and drove into the Shoshone National Forest to check the course of a 10k race her gym was planning. When her husband returned home at 4:30 p.m., she was not there. By nightfall, he alerted neighbors and the sheriff's department. Bechtel's white Toyota station wagon was found parked off a dirt road in the Shoshone Forest. No trace of Bechtel has been found.	
17 August 1997	Guy Hever	20	Golan Heights, Israel	Hever, an Israeli soldier, reported for guard duty at a bunker near his artillery base on the morning of 17 August 1997. He was absent when his relief arrived later in the day, and has not been seen since. Since he was on active duty when he disappeared, he is considered to be missing in action.	
18 August 1997	Don Lewis	59	Tampa, Florida, U.S.	Lewis, a self-made millionaire and co-owner of Wildlife on Easy Street, disappeared after leaving his home in Tampa, Florida. His van was found 40 mi (64 km) away at a private airport with the keys on the floorboard. Investigations were also conducted in Costa Rica, where Lewis owned land and traveled frequently. No evidence has been found indicating he was killed.	
13 October 1997	Amanda Dawn Gallion	14	Gillette, Wyoming, U.S.	Gallion, an American teenager, disappeared after leaving her house in Gillette, Wyoming, on the morning of 13 October 1997 to go to school. The suspected serial killer Nathaniel Bar-Jonah has been implicated, but no conclusive evidence was found. An accused murderer from South Dakota was implicated in 2007, but the case was dropped, and Gillette police believe she may have ran away with her boyfriend Patrick Lee Ghering, who vanished on 19 October 1997.	
23 November 1997	Sabrina Aisenberg	4 months	Valrico, Florida, U.S.	Aisenberg, a four-month-old infant, vanished from her crib during the night of 23–24 November 1997. The following morning, her mother discovered that the crib was empty and their attached garage had been unlocked. No trace of the Aisenberg baby has ever been found. The parents won a large settlement for malicious prosecution.	

== 1998 ==
Date	Person(s)	Age when disappeared	Missing from	Circumstances	Refs.
February 1998	Widji Thukul	34	Indonesia	Indonesian poet and democracy activist Thukul has been missing since February 1998, when he last made contact with his wife.	
2 March 1998	Suzanne Lyall	19	Albany, New York, U.S.	Lyall was last seen getting off a bus on State University of New York at Albany campus on the night of 2 March 1998, after returning from her job at a shopping mall. Her ATM card was used the next afternoon to withdraw money at a convenience store elsewhere in the city; since then, no signs of her have been found, and foul play is suspected. Her parents successfully lobbied for changes in state and federal law regarding missing-person investigations on college campuses, and founded the Center for Hope to support families of the missing.	
4 March 1998	Rui Pedro Teixeira Mendonça	11	Lousada, Portugal	Mendonça went missing while riding his bicycle near his home on 4 March 1998, and his case remains unsolved. In September 1998, Mendonça was one of 16 children identified in materials confiscated from a raid on alleged members of an international child pornography ring called the Wonderland Club. However, his whereabouts remain unknown, and police suspect that he was murdered by his abductors after being abused on camera for other members of the paedophile ring.	
9 March 1998	Gilbert Wynter	37	London, England	Wynter, a jeweler and enforcer for the Adams crime family, disappeared in London on 9 March 1998. His disappearance is believed to be related to the murder of Saul Nahome in December that year: both men were involved in a drug deal where £800,000 went missing.	
14 March 1998	Leonard Dirickson	39	Strong City, Oklahoma, U.S.	Dirickson was having breakfast with his son at their farmhouse in Oklahoma when an unidentified male driving a 1994 Ford F-150 arrived inquiring about a sale of one of the horses he owned. He departed with the man to view the horse and was never seen again.	
c. 27 April 1998	Taisha Abelar	Unknown	Death Valley National Park, U.S.	Abelar, Donner, and Partin, all acolytes of the writer Carlos Castaneda, disappeared together with two other female acolytes after Castaneda's death on 27 April 1998. Partin's car was found in Death Valley National Park later that year; her partial skeleton was found in the park in 2003 and identified by DNA analysis in 2006, but her cause of death was undetermined, and no sign of the other women was ever found. Some of Castaneda's associates suspect his teachings about death inspired the women to commit suicide.	
c. 27 April 1998	Florinda Donner	53–54	Death Valley National Park, U.S.		
c. 27 April 1998	Patricia Partin	Unknown	Death Valley National Park, U.S.		
28 July 1998	Deirdre Jacob	18	Newbridge, Ireland	Jacob, a student teacher, was last seen on 28 July 1998 around 3 p.m. near her home in Newbridge, County Kildare. In August 2018, the Garda Síochána announced that her disappearance was being treated as a murder case.	
28 August 1998	Pirouz Davani	37	Tehran, Iran	Davani, an Iranian leftist activist and editor of an Iranian newspaper, disappeared on 28 August 1998 while leaving his residence. Some suggest that Davani was murdered.	
c. 11 November 1998	Joan Lawrence	77	Huntsville, Ontario, Canada	Last known to be living on the property of the Laan family touted as a retirement home, Lawrence was paying over $700 in rent for an uninsulated shack without running water, heat, or electricity. It is believed that Lawrence, a "cat lady," selected this accommodation to keep over 30 cats as pets. After being reported missing on 25 November 1998, the resulting Ontario Provincial Police (OPP) investigation did not locate Lawrence's body, but identified three other residents —John Semple (90), John Crofts (71) and Ralph Grant (70)— as missing. Their pension cheques, however, were still being cashed. No bodies have been recovered, and no one has faced charges in Lawrence's presumed homicide.	
5 December 1998	Derrick Engebretson	8	Rocky Point, Oregon, U.S.	Engebretson disappeared while searching for a Christmas tree with his father and grandfather. A circular path of footprints in the snow was traced to a road, where bits of chopped wood and a snow angel were discovered; Engebretson had a small hatchet with him at the time he disappeared. A convicted child rapist is considered a suspect in his disappearance.	
c. 1998	Angelo Cruz	c. 40	Puerto Rico	Retired Puerto Rican professional basketball player Angelo Cruz disappeared during a trip to visit family in Puerto Rico.	

== 1999 ==
Date	Person(s)	Age when disappeared	Missing from	Circumstances	Refs.
7 February 1999	Paul Skiba	38	Westminster, Colorado, U.S.	Nine-year-old Sarah Skiba accompanied her father Paul, and Chivers, an employee of his moving company, on a furniture delivery job. This was the last time they were seen. A moving truck on the company lot was subsequently discovered with bullet holes in its door, blood smeared inside, and portions of a human scalp lying near the windshield. The whereabouts of all three remain unknown.	
7 February 1999	Sarah Skiba	9	Westminster, Colorado, U.S.	Nine-year-old Sarah Skiba accompanied her father Paul, and Chivers, an employee of his moving company, on a furniture delivery job. This was the last time they were seen. A moving truck on the company lot was subsequently discovered with bullet holes in its door, blood smeared inside, and portions of a human scalp lying near the windshield. The whereabouts of all three remain unknown.	
7 February 1999	Lorenzo Chivers	36	Westminster, Colorado, U.S.	Nine-year-old Sarah Skiba accompanied her father Paul, and Chivers, an employee of his moving company, on a furniture delivery job. This was the last time they were seen. A moving truck on the company lot was subsequently discovered with bullet holes in its door, blood smeared inside, and portions of a human scalp lying near the windshield. The whereabouts of all three remain unknown.	
7 February 1999	Erica Baker	9	Kettering, Ohio, U.S.	Baker went out to take her dog for a walk, but never returned. Her dog was found by itself. Christian Gabriel confessed to accidentally killing Baker and burying her body somewhere, but he insists that he cannot remember the exact location.	
12 March 1999	Kevin Palmer	37	Curdridge, England	Palmer, a British timeshare salesman, traveled for unknown reasons from Spain to Curdridge in the UK in March 1999, where, following an argument in a taxi, he got out and was never seen again.	
7 May 1999	Yury Zacharanka	47	Belarus	Zacharanka, a Belarusian opposition leader, disappeared on 7 May 1999, and has not been seen.	
16 May 1999	Ukshin Hoti	55	Istok, Kosovo	A Kosovo Albanian philosopher and activist, Hoti was the founder of UNIKOMB, a political party in Kosovo. He disappeared shortly before he was to be released from prison in May 1999. His whereabouts are unknown; many human rights activists consider him dead.	
29 May 1999	Tammy Lamondin-Gagnon	20	Newmarket, Ontario, Canada	Lamondin, a young Ojibwe woman, disappeared on 29 May 1999 and was likely murdered after attending a house party.	
16 September 1999	Viktar Hanchar	42	Minsk, Belarus	Hanchar, a Belarusian opposition leader, disappeared along with his friend, businessman Krasouski, from a streetside. Signs of a struggle were found where they were last seen; the two were widely believed to have been abducted and later murdered.	
16 September 1999	Anatol Krasouski	47	Minsk, Belarus	Hanchar, a Belarusian opposition leader, disappeared along with his friend, businessman Krasouski, from a streetside. Signs of a struggle were found where they were last seen; the two were widely believed to have been abducted and later murdered.	
7–10 October 1999	Teresa Ann Davidson-Murphy	33	Rainier, Oregon, U.S.	Teresa Ann Davidson-Murphy disappeared in Rainier, Oregon in between 7 and 10 October 1999 after leaving her house and has not been seen since. She is believed to be dead.	
16 October 1999	Raisa Räisänen	16	Tampere, Finland	Räisänen, a 16-year-old basketball player disappeared in downtown Tampere on 16 October 1999. The last confirmed sighting of her was at 10:50 p.m. local time. Due to an EU summit being held in Tampere on the same day, security had been tightened, and there were policemen from all over the country. Räisänen was declared dead in absentia in 2007. The investigation was changed from manslaughter to murder in September 2019, because the statute of limitations on manslaughter in Finland is 20 years.	
November 1999	Marat Manafov	Unknown	Bratislava, Slovakia	Manafov, an Azerbaijani businessman and lawyer, disappeared in November 1999. Police have since investigated whether he was abducted or killed.	
15 November 1999	Julie Surprenant	16	Terrebonne, Canada	Surprenant disappeared from Terrebonne, Quebec on 15 November 1999. A neighbour was quickly considered the prime suspect, but the authorities had insufficient evidence to charge him. In 2006, this same neighbour made a deathbed confession to her murder that was not revealed for several years.	
10 December 1999	Michael Negrete	18	Los Angeles, California, U.S.	Negrete, a music student at UCLA, disappeared from his student accommodation and was never seen again. Police have treated his disappearance as suspicious, and have classified the case as a homicide.	

== See also ==
- List of fugitives from justice who disappeared
- List of kidnappings
- List of murder convictions without a body
- List of people who disappeared mysteriously (pre-1910)
- List of people who disappeared mysteriously (1910–1970)
- List of people who disappeared mysteriously (1970s)
- List of people who disappeared mysteriously (1980s)
- List of people who disappeared mysteriously (2000–present)
- Lists of solved missing person cases
- List of unsolved deaths
