= Negrete (surname) =

Negrete or Negrette is a surname. Notable people with the surname include:

- Anthony David Negrete or Speak! (born 1987), American rapper and songwriter.
- Fidel Negrete (1932–2016), Mexican long-distance runner.
- Francisco Negrete (born 1966), Mexican bobsledder.
- Gumersindo Magaña Negrete (1939–2013), Mexican politician.
- Herman Adam Negrete (born 1965), Mexican athlete.
- Jared Negrete (born 1978), American Boy Scout who disappeared.
- Jorge Negrete (1911–1953), Mexican singer and actor.
- Lorenzo Negrete (born 1988), Mexican singer, musician and actor.
- Manuel Negrete (disambiguation), several people.
- Martín Barragán Negrete (born 1991), Mexican association football forward.
- Michael Negrete (born 1981), American student who disappeared.
- Miguel Negrete (before 1825 – 1895), Mexican general and politician.
- Oscar Negrete (born 1987), Colombian boxer.
- Pedro Celestino Negrete (1777–1846), Spanish politician and military man.
- Rafael Negrete (born 1976), Mexican actor and singer.
- Yerko Martín Núñez Negrette (born 1973), Bolivian politician and agronomist.
- Vitor Negrete (1967–2006), Brazilian mountaineer.

== See also ==
- Gloria Negrete McLeod (born 1941), American politician.
