= Taif (disambiguation) =

Taif is a city and governorate in the Mecca Region of Saudi Arabia.

Taif may also refer to:

== People ==
- Taïf (arrondissement), arrondissement of Mbacké in Diourbel Region in Senegal
- Taif Agreement, 1989 agreement intended to end the Lebanese Civil War
- Taif Ajba, Abkhaz poet
- TAIF JSC, former name of Sibur-RT, a Russian investment holding and oil company
- Taif Sami Mohammed, Iraqi statesman
- Ottoman frigate Taif
- A variant of Teyf, a surname
- Tingsryds AIF, or simply TAIF, an ice hockey club based in Tingsryd, Sweden
