= Susan Walsh =

Susan Walsh may refer to:

- Susan Walsh (actress) (1948–2009), American actress
- Susan Walsh (missing person)
- Susan Walsh (swimmer) (born 1962), American swimmer
- Susan Smith-Walsh (born 1971), Irish hurdler

== See also ==
- Suzanne Elise Walsh, American academic administrator
