= Disappearance of Dannette and Jeannette Millbrook =

1990 disappearance

Dannette Millbrook, Jeannette Millbrook
- Dannette and Jeannette
- Born: Dannette Latonia Millbrook, Jeannette Latrice Millbrook; April 2, 1974
- Disappeared: March 18, 1990 (aged 15); Augusta, Georgia, U.S.
- Status: Missing for 36 years, 7 months and 3 days

The disappearance of Dannette Latonia Millbrook and Jeannette Latrice Millbrook is an American unsolved missing persons case in which fraternal twins from Augusta, Georgia, disappeared on March 18, 1990, when they were 15 years old. Their surname is often misspelled as "Millbrooks" and Jeannette's middle name is often given as "Latressa" due to errors on police reports.

The twins were last known to have been seen by a gas station clerk at the Pump-N-Shop gas station on the corner of 12th Street and Martin Luther King Jr. Boulevard around 4:30 pm.

Their case was closed in 1991 and was reopened in 2013.

== Disappearance ==
On March 18, 1990, Dannette and Jeannette Millbrook walked to the local Church's Chicken on Laney Walker Boulevard. When they returned, they informed their mother, Louise, that a man in a van had followed them for part of their walk. Nothing further is known about this man.

Later in the day, the twins walked to their godfather's house to borrow money for a city bus to school the following week, as the teens and their family had recently moved to a new apartment further from their school. After receiving the $20 for bus fare and a little extra for snacks, the teens went to their cousin's house and asked her to walk home with them. The cousin's mother would not allow her to accompany the twins because it would be dark soon. After visiting their cousin, they made a stop at their older sister's home and stayed for approximately fifteen minutes. They also requested that their older sister walk with them, but she declined due to recently giving birth. After their disappearance, family members considered it unusual that the twins made multiple requests for company on the walk home that day.

Locations
1 Gas station - last known location.

Next, they continued on to a local gas station, where they bought chips, candy, and soda. The clerk, Gloria, was familiar with the twins. She did not recall anything out of the ordinary about their behavior. She is the last person to see Dannette and Jeannette.

Jeannette was last seen wearing a blue pullover shirt over a white turtleneck with a beige skirt, white stockings, and white sneakers. At the time of her disappearance, she stood 5 feet 4 inches and weighed 125 pounds. Dannette was last seen wearing a white shirt with an image of Mickey Mouse, white jeans, and black shoes. At the time of her disappearance, she stood 5 feet 6 inches and weighed 130 pounds. Dannette has been described as "bowlegged". Both girls had pierced ears, shoulder-length hair styled in Jheri curls, and they both have a scar near their navels from a surgery shortly after birth.

Dannette and Jeanette were enrolled as students at Lucy Laney High School. The twins were known to be good teens and were not troublemakers; they did not have a history of running away and there appears to be no motive for their disappearance. The twins did not have a history of misbehavior, outside of a single instance that occurred as a result of one of the twins being bullied at a bus stop.

== Investigation ==
=== Original investigation ===
After the girls were discovered missing, the family was told to wait 24 hours before making a report. Little is known about the initial investigation, as the original police file was reportedly lost. There is much debate as to why exactly the case was initially closed. The family reports that they were told the case was closed when the girls turned 17 because they had reached an age at which they could no longer be legally forced to come home if found. The original investigator claims that he was told by a juvenile case officer that the girls had been found, which led to both the case being closed and the girls being removed from the national registry of missing children. Mistakes in reports from the original investigation, such as misspelling the last name as "Millbrooks" and listing Jeannette's middle name as "Latressa", have remained unchanged in case files and can still be found on associated databases such as The Charley Project and National Center for Missing and Exploited Children.

=== Reopened in 2013 ===
Despite the case being closed in 1991, family members continued to persistently contact the sheriff's department to inquire about the whereabouts of the twins over the years. The family was given several explanations for the closure of the case, including the explanation that the girls had been removed from the home and placed into foster care, where they were eventually adopted. Further investigation revealed this to be false. A close relative did have children in the foster care system, leading the family to believe that this was the source of the confusion. These calls ultimately led to the case being reopened in 2013. In media releases the sheriff was quoted as saying, “We think a terrible injustice has been done for the last 20 years” which helped to fuel interest in the new investigation. The current investigating agency is the Richmond County Sheriff's Office.

Although in 2017 the Sheriff's office met with the Millbrook family to discuss the case and collect familial DNA samples, as of 2019 it is unclear if the case is continuing to be investigated by local law enforcement.

In response to a 2023 request for comment from Dateline NBC, Sergeant Randall Amos of the Richmond County Sheriff's Office wrote, "At this time I am going to respectfully decline to comment on this case," adding that his office "is willing to look into any new evidence/leads that become available."

=== Reward and billboard ===
The producers of the podcast The Fall Line have taken an active role in the search for Dannette and Jeannette, and helped raise a $10,000 reward. A meeting with the sheriff's department led the Millbrook family to believe the reward would be officially announced and matched by the sheriff's department, but the sheriff's department denies making this commitment.

Concerned about the lack of publicity for the reward, the producers of The Fall Line and Unresolved podcasts worked together to raise money for a billboard to advertise the reward fund. As of March 2018, a little over $2,500 was raised and plans were in motion to create the billboard.

=== 1993 Aiken County Jane Doe ===
Skeletal remains of an unidentified black female were found in Aiken County on January 25, 1993, and were believed to be the result of a homicide occurring sometime between 1990 and 1992. The remains were found near Shaw's Creek off of Highway 191 in Aiken County, South Carolina. This woman remains unidentified and has become known as one of the Aiken County Jane Does. The family strongly believes that facial reconstructions of these remains resemble and could be Jeannette. When the remains were originally found, the family was told that it was not either of the twins. However, the family was not given a reason why. As of August 2017, the coroner's office reportedly has plans to compare DNA from the Aiken County Jane Doe to familial DNA. After the analysis it was discovered that the skeletal remains found did not belong to the twins.

=== Joseph Patrick Washington connection ===
Joseph Patrick Washington was active in the girls' neighborhood and some believe that he may have been involved in the girls' disappearance. Washington was sentenced to 17 consecutive life sentences in 1995 for numerous criminal convictions associated with abductions and sexual assaults of 5 women, three of whom survived. He faced the death penalty in the murder of Marilyn Denise Kelly and was suspected in the murder of Loretta Dukes but died in 1999 before the trial started.

== Family ==
The twins’ mother is Mary “Louise” Sturgis. She has been very involved in trying to find her daughters. Their father, John Millbrook, died in 2021 and spent the last few years of his life living in a nursing home while suffering from dementia; however, he had expressed no desire to look for his daughters. The twins’ sister, Shanta Sturgis, has also become a vocal advocate in the search for Dannette and Jeannette. Persistent calls to the sheriff's department from Shanta prompted the case to be reopened in 2013. Shanta has been very critical of both the initial and current investigations. Dannette and Jeannette have 8 siblings. This caused some confusion after their disappearance, as their sister was often mistaken as one of the twins.

== In media ==
=== Podcasts ===
The first season of The Fall Line podcast explores the details surrounding the disappearance of the Millbrook twins. The case of the twins’ disappearance has been discussed on several other podcasts including My Favorite Murder, Thin Air, The Trail Went Cold, Unresolved, and Crime Junkie.

| Podcast | Episode | Title |
|---|---|---|
| The Fall Line | Season 1 | Various |
| My Favorite Murder† | #87 | "Hither and Yon" |
| Thin Air | #8 | "Jeannette and Dannette Millbrook" |
| The Trail Went Cold | #12 | "The Millbrook Twins" |
| Unresolved | #3.8 #3.9 #3.10 #3.13 | "The Millbrook Twins Pt 1: The Known" "The Millbrook Twins Pt 2: The Unknown" "The Millbrook Twins Pt 3: "The Now" "The Millbrook Twins: Update" |
| Martinis & Murder | #156 | "The Disappearance of the Millbrook Twins - Part I" |
| Crime Junkie | August 8, 2022 | "MISSING: The Milbrook Twins" |
| Morning Cup Of Murder | April 2, 2024 | "The Unsolved Disappearance of Twins Who Walked Home" |

† Briefly discussed The Fall Line podcast and the case, did not cover as a featured story.

=== Television ===
Oxygen Media aired a two-hour television special on the case, which premiered on November 23, 2019.

== See also ==
- Disappearance of James Gramling – Another Augusta disappearance that happened 7 years later
- List of people who disappeared mysteriously (1990s)
