= Disappearance of Tanja Groen =

1993 missing person case in the Netherlands

Tanja Groen
- Born: Tanja Afra Maria Groen; June 23, 1975; Netherlands
- Disappeared: August 31, 1993 (aged 18) probably between Maastricht and Gronsveld, Netherlands
- Status: Missing for 33 years, 2 months and 3 days
- Known for: mysterious disappearance
- Mother: Corrie Groen

Locations
1 Herbenusstraat where Groen was last seen.

Tanja Afra Maria Groen (born June 23, 1975) is a Dutch teenage girl who disappeared near Maastricht in the summer of 1993. Groen came from Schagen and was just about to start studying health sciences. Her case was closed in May 2026 after 33 years of searching for her. The police and Public Prosecution Service have stated that they are willing to reopen the case if new breakthroughs occur.

== Disappearance ==
Tanja Afra Maria Groen disappeared in the night of Tuesday, 31 August 1993, after she had left a hazing party at the Circumflex student society in the centre of Maastricht by bicycle to her room in Gronsveld. She never arrived there. The weekend after her disappearance she was supposed to go to visit her parents in Schagen.

== Criminal investigation ==
Despite a thorough and lengthy search for Groen's disappearance, nothing was found for years and therefore nothing was known about her fate. From the beginning, however, the police assumed a crime. There were no concrete suspects, although they did investigate whether links could be made with previously convicted murderers such as Willem S. and Marc Dutroux.

In the summer of 2012, a bicycle was recovered from the Maas river, based on information from a dowser. This bicycle turned out not to belong to Groen and the investigation stalled again. At the end of June 2014, human bones were found by a hiker in a field near Gronsveld. However, an investigation by the Netherlands Forensic Institute showed that these bones did not belong to Groen. In August 2018, the parents made a video appeal via Amber Alert in the hope of finding out more about their daughter's fate.

After a serious tip, a man's grave was opened in Maastricht on January 22, 2020, because the NFI wanted to search for the remains of a woman who was buried in the same grave as the man. However, this investigation also did not lead to the discovery of Groen's body.

In January 2022, forensic psychologist Peter van Koppen and his fellow scientists found three 'promising' places where Tanja Groen could possibly be buried during a search on the Strabrechtse Heide in Geldrop, Brabant. A new search was therefore conducted at that location, but her body was not found.

At the end of 2022, the police and judiciary in Belgium and the Netherlands investigated a possible role that serial killer Marc Dutroux could have played in the disappearance of Tanja Groen. Dutroux had been in the picture as a possible perpetrator in the Tanja Groen case for much longer, but this investigation had never yielded anything.

On April 29, 2024, it was announced that DNA traces from the Dutroux case will be compared by the Netherlands Forensic Institute with DNA from the Groen case.

== The Golden Tip Foundation ==
In June 2021, crime reporter Peter R. de Vries launched the De Gouden Tip Foundation. The aim of this foundation is to raise a million euros in rewards through crowdfunding to solve stalled police investigations, so-called cold cases. The first case the foundation attempted to solve concerned the disappearance of Tanja Groen. A week after the attack on De Vries, the foundation had raised the million euros, partly thanks to the widespread attention that the TV program Tijd voor MAX had paid to the case.

On December 22, 2022, the Peter R. de Vries Foundation and the Limburg police announced that the promised reward had not led to a new breakthrough in the investigation into Tanja Groen's disappearance. Six months earlier, the deadline for claiming the amount had already passed. The million euros that had been earmarked for the Tanja Groen case would now be spent on other cold cases and on supporting victims of crime.

When the Tanja Groen case was closed in May 2026 the Peter R. de Vries Foundation stated that they continue to hope for answers and continues to urge anyone with relevant information or tips to come forward.

== Sources and notes ==
- The mysterious disappearance of Tanja Groen, Missing (archive.org, dated October 8, 2013)
- Dossier Tanja Groen, peterrdevries.nl (archive.org, dated 11 December 2007)
- Tanja Afra Maria GROEN, Missing (profile/archive.org, dated May 10, 2013)
- Tanja Afra Maria Groen, Politie.nl (profile)
- News overview Tanja Groen, RTV Noord-Holland (archive.org, dated July 17, 2014)
- Overview: disappearance of Tanja Groen, RTV Noord-Holland (archive.org, dated July 7, 2014)
- Hendriks, Rob, Cycling tour without end, Mooi Limburgs Boekenfonds, 2009, ISBN 9789085960522.
- Twenty white roses for Tanja Groen, Noordhollands Dagblad (August 31, 2013, via archive.org)
- Fear is that she will never be found, Algemeen Dagblad (24 May 2009)
- Dozens of tips about missing RL student, Limburgs Dagblad (September 8, 1993)
- Twenty-six tips after TV broadcast about Tanja Groen, Limburgs Dagblad (November 8, 1993)
- Student Tanja Groen (18) disappeared from the face of the earth, Limburgs Dagblad (6 September 1994)
- Limburg student missing for almost a week after initiation party, De Telegraaf (6 September 1993)
- Murderer was at Tanja Groen's campsite, Crimesite.nl (November 5, 2012)
- Tanja Groen involved in Dutroux case, Trouw (14 February 1997)
- Tanja Groen's bicycle found', NOS (26 August 2012)
- Resurfaced bicycle not belonging to Tanja Groen , NU.nl (September 17, 2012)
- A scream was heard there on the night that Tanja Groen disappeared' (audio), RTV Noord-Holland (June 22, 2014, via archive.org)
- Bones found near Gronsveld, NOS (June 22, 2014)
- Bone remains not of missing Tanja Groen, De Telegraaf (July 4, 2014)
- Parents of Tanja Groen make emotional appeal: 'Please open your mouth, anonymously if necessary', De Limburger (24 August 2018)
- OM: Body of Tanja Groen possibly placed in freshly dug grave in 1993, NU.nl, January 22, 2020
- No trace of missing Tanja Groen (18) found in grave in Maastricht. Het Laatste Nieuws (23 January 2020). Retrieved 23 January 2020.
- Grave of Tanja Groen has not been found on the Strabrechtse Heide, Omroep Brabant (January 20, 2022)
- Investigation into possible role of Dutroux in disappearance of Tanja Groen, NOS (October 6, 2022)
- Cold case Tanja Groen: still the work of Marc Dutroux? Investigative services in the Netherlands and Belgium worked completely at cross purposes for decades, Noordhollands Dagblad (October 7, 2022)
- Parents of Tanja Groen on possible link with Dutroux: “We secretly hope so”. Het Laatste Nieuws (October 9, 2022). Retrieved December 22, 2022.
- DNA from Dutroux case at NFI for comparison of Tanja Groen's traces. RTL.nl (29 April 2024). Retrieved 29 April 2024.
- Peter R. de Vries has already raised over 150,000 euros for the foundation. RTL Boulevard (June 24, 2021). Retrieved July 15, 2021.
- Peter R.'s big wish comes true: 1 million raised for Tanja Groen's golden tip. RTL Nieuws (July 13, 2021). Retrieved July 15, 2021.
- No golden tip in Tanja Groen case, million euros to be released. NOS News (22 December 2022). Retrieved 22 December 2022.

== See also ==
- List of people who disappeared mysteriously (1990s)
