= Disappearance of Cleashindra Hall =

Young woman missing in Arkansas since 1994

Cleashindra Hall
- Born: Cleashindra Denise Hall; March 30, 1976
- Disappeared: May 9, 1994 (aged 18); Pine Bluff, Arkansas, U.S.
- Status: Missing for 32 years, 3 months and 9 days
- Height: 5 ft 9 in (1.75 m)
- Parents: Willie Hall (father); Laurell Williams Hall (mother)

Cleashindra Denise Hall (born March 30, 1976) is an American woman who has been missing since May 9, 1994. Hall was also known as Clea.

At the time of her disappearance, Cleashindra was two weeks away from graduating high school. She was an honor student, had landed a summer internship at a Boston pediatrician's office, and had been accepted into the pre-med program at Tennessee State University.

== Background ==
Cleashindra Hall was an honors student at her high school. In May 1994, Hall attended her senior prom. She was expected to graduate later that month. Hall disappeared two weeks prior to her expected graduation, and never attended the ceremony.

Hall intended to follow a career as a pediatrician. She was expected to enroll in pre-medical courses at Tennessee State University.

Hall held an after-school job at the home office of Larry Amos. The office was located in Pine Bluff, Arkansas. After finishing her work hours, she typically called one of her parents to ask for a ride home.

Hall had no previous history of leaving without telling anyone. She was reportedly not a "troubled teen" and had no known reason to voluntarily escape her life. Hall did not have a boyfriend at the time of her disappearance.

== Disappearance ==
External image
- Age progression of Hall to age 38

Locations, Pine Bluff, Arkansas
1 Last known location.

Hall disappeared sometime after 8:30 PM on Monday, May 9, 1994. She was last seen walking into her afterschool job at the home office of 43-year-old Larry Amos in Pine Bluff, Arkansas.

Hall last called her mother just after 8:00 PM, but she was not ready to return yet. She told her mother to expect a second phone call when the time came for her ride home. The second phone call never took place.

Amos told the police that Hall had gotten into a car with an unknown individual after she had finished work at his office. Hall was last seen wearing a white shirt and short set with a navy blue polka dot pattern on the shorts and blue stripes on the shirt, with white socks and white athletic shoes.

Laurell Hall, Hall's mother, fell asleep while waiting for her daughter to call. She awoke around 1:00 AM on May 10, 1994. She soon realized that Hall had never called for her ride, and had yet to return home. Hall's parents reported her missing on May 10, but they were told that since Clea was legally an adult, they would have to wait 24 hours until they were allowed to file a missing persons report.

== Investigation and aftermath ==
The police rebuffed Hall's mother's initial attempt to report her missing, claiming that she would have to be missing for 24 hours before her disappearance could be reported.

Theories regarding Hall's fate range from her attempting to walk home and being abducted to leaving voluntarily.

Two weeks following Hall's disappearance, the police searched the home of Amos, which also served as his office, since that was the last place where Hall had been seen. According to Laurell Hall, there was no sign of a struggle there. However, Hall's mother believed that Amos had enough time to discard any evidence potentially left from such a struggle. In her opinion, the police should not have waited weeks to examine a potential crime scene. Lt. Terry Hopson of the Pine Bluff Police Department has reported that their search of the Amos home failed to turn up any evidence that Hall was either injured or attacked there.

Larry Amos' property has been searched pursuant to a warrant. Larry Amos is considered a person of interest.

Police believe Hall left with someone she knew. Her disappearance was featured in an episode of Find Our Missing.

According to Terry Hopson, the local police "have spent many hours and manpower on this case over the years", and the investigation was still ongoing in 2009.

The local police considers the Hall case likely to involve kidnapping, but reportedly had no clues to the identity of any potential kidnappers. Amos reported seeing Hall entering someone's car, but did not see who was driving and could offer no description of the vehicle. Hall did not have a mobile phone with her, and the case predates the mobile phone tracking methods used by police in other missing person cases.

An early suspect in the case was a local boy, whose name was not given to the press. Hall reportedly liked him and acted friendly with him. The boy was subjected to police interrogation and his vehicle was searched, but the police could not connect him to the disappearance and he did not provide any leads. The boy was also subjected to a polygraph test, but the results were inconclusive.

== Physical description ==
Hall was Black. Her reported height was 5'8" (1.73 metres). She weighed 120 pounds (54.55 kilograms). She had "dark eyes" and "dark hair". She had short hair at the time of her disappearance, and wore it in a ponytail when last seen. Her only other distinctive feature was a surgical scar on her left knee.

== See also ==
- List of people who disappeared mysteriously (1990s)
