= Disappearance of Manuel Schadwald =

1993 child disappearance in Germany

Manuel Schadwald
- Born: Manuel Schadwald; 24 January 1981; Berlin, West Germany
- Disappeared: 24 July 1993 (aged 12); Berlin, Germany
- Status: Missing for 32 years, 11 months and 10 days
- Height: 5 ft 2 in (1.57 m)

Manuel Schadwald (born 24 January 1981 in Berlin – disappeared 24 July 1993) was a German boy living in Berlin who disappeared without a trace at the age of 12. The Berlin police closed the case without result in 1998. Traces led to the pedophile and child pornography scene in the Benelux countries, with a possible connection to the affair surrounding the Belgian child molester Marc Dutroux. According to press reports, Schadwald was allegedly abused and killed on a Dutch yacht, after which the case was allegedly covered up due to the involvement of high-ranking circles.

== Disappearance ==
Manuel Schadwald lived with his single mother in the Berlin district of Tempelhof. He attended primary school and was reportedly a good student. Schadwald enjoyed playing with computers in department stores and leisure centers. On 24 July 1993, he left his apartment to take public transportation to the leisure and recreation center Wuhlheide (FEZ) in Berlin-Köpenick. When he set off, he was wearing jeans, black sneakers, a gray T-shirt and a gray summer jacket. On his back, he carried a turquoise backpack with an inscription. However, he never arrived and was reported missing by his parents. The case received a great deal of media attention in the period that followed, and the police conducted an intensive search for the boy. After evidence had emerged that Schadwald might already be dead, the parents filed a murder charge against persons unknown. In 1998, the public prosecutor discontinued the investigation without result. Attorney General Hansjürgen Karge announced that it was unclear whether Schadwald was still alive. The Berlin press had previously reported that the investigating authorities had not followed up leads sufficiently and intensively enough. Several cases were brought against detectives for negligence, but these were later dropped.

== Presumed death ==
In June 1994, the Berlin police received a tip-off regarding Schadwald's whereabouts when an anonymous call was made to the "Mann-O-Meter" advice center for gay and bisexual men in Schöneberg. The caller provided a description of the offender and said that Schadwald had been in Amsterdam and was already dead. This led to investigative efforts in Rotterdam and Amsterdam, but these were discontinued in 1995 without any results. The Berlin police did not make this information public. In 1997, a Dutch television station reported that Schadwald had been identified in a child pornography film. However, this was later denied by the Berlin police. In 1998, the investigation was closed, and the Berlin police falsely claimed to have no leads.

According to reports in the German newspaper Die Welt and the Dutch Algemeen Dagblad in 2015, which cited witnesses and informants from secret services and the police, kidnapped children from Berlin were allegedly sold to brothels in Amsterdam, Rotterdam, and Antwerp in the early 1990s, which the Berlin public prosecutor's office allegedly knew about as early as 1993. Schadwald is also said to have been abused in child brothels in Amsterdam and Rotterdam. In the 1990s, the Belgian Marc Dutroux was regularly active in the Netherlands, where he is rumored to have had contacts in the highest circles of business and politics. Dutroux was involved in similar activities. The associated network of pedophiles is also said to have been involved in the production of snuff films in which children were abused, tortured, and killed. The mastermind behind this network, Ludwig A., was known to the Berlin police. An English witness in the 1997 documentary The Boy Business spoke of a film in which a boy was abused and suffocated on a boat.

The victim in the film was possibly Schadwald. According to files from the Dutch intelligence agency AIVD, a German boy was murdered on a Dutch boat, which was confirmed by several informants to Die Welt. After that, the case was covered up "because there were influential people on the boat". The boat in question was allegedly the sailing yacht "Apollo", where influential persons abused children while being filmed. After the incident, the yacht is said to have been towed to a military port of the Dutch Navy and cleaned up. Schadwald's body was reportedly sunk at sea. The yacht was owned by a Dutch accountant whose partner, Gerrit Ulrich, was involved in a scandal in 1998 when thousands of photos and videos of abused and tortured children, including babies, were found in the seaside resort town of Zandvoort. One of Ulrich's partners told journalists that he had brought Schadwald from Berlin to the Netherlands. Ulrich was eventually shot dead while trying to blow the whistle on the network, and evidence was reportedly removed from his house before police could seize it, including possibly the film of Schadwald's death.

The Belgian social worker Gina Pardaens-Bernaer investigated the Dutroux and Schadwald cases. According to her own statements, she was in possession of a copy of the film in which Schadwald's death is said to have been recorded. According to her statements, she received death threats, and secret services were interested in the material in her possession. On 13 November 1998, her house was broken into, and the following day she died in a car accident shortly before she was to be questioned by the police. Her death was one of 27 unexplained deaths related to the Dutroux affair.

== Suspicions against the father of Schadwald ==
Rainer Wolf, the father of Schadwald, was also among the suspects in the case. According to information from the Berliner Morgenpost, he was an agent of the East German Stasi and infiltrated the West German peace movement from 1984 after a staged move to the West. According to the affidavit of an intelligence liaison officer, he is also said to have blackmailed politicians, lawyers, and businesspeople in Western Europe with child pornography. The children came from East German (GDR) foster care. The blackmail material is said to have later come under the control of the CIA. The old Stasi networks are believed to have remained active after German reunification. Wolf came under suspicion due to his possible connections to the Berlin pedophile scene, including the sale of his own son to brothels in the Netherlands. He was arrested for this in 1998, but released after a few days.

== Literature ==
- Oliver Greyf: Der Fall Manuel Schadwald und Das Zandvoort-Netzwerk. 2023. ISBN 978-9-403637-89-1

== See also ==
- List of people who disappeared mysteriously (1990s)
