= Disappearance of Ames Glover =

English disappearance case

Ames Glover
- Born: 21 August 1989
- Disappeared: 5 February 1990 (5 months old); Southall, England, UK
- Status: Missing for 36 years, 8 months and 29 days

Ames Glover (born 21 August 1989) disappeared on 5 February 1990 at the age of five months from the back seat of his father's car in Southall, a suburban town in West London, England. No trace of him has ever been found.

== Disappearance ==
Ames's father Paul Glover reported to police that he had left his son in the back seat of his car in Southall for approximately twenty minutes while he went to a cashpoint followed by a take-away restaurant. On his return he discovered that Ames was missing.

== Police investigations ==
=== Initial investigation ===
Over 2,000 people, including both of Ames's parents, were interviewed by police investigating his disappearance, but no charges were brought and there were no solid leads on what had happened to him.

=== Controversy ===
Police conduct of the case has been criticised at the time and subsequently, information about Ames's family set-up (his parents were estranged at the time of his disappearance, and he had been on an "at risk register") was passed to the media by police and it seems likely that this led the case to receive a much lower public profile than other child disappearances around the same time. Racism in media and public attitudes has also been implicated: writing about the case in the The Independent over two decades after Ames disappeared, Philip Hensher reflected that it is "harder to make a good story out of a missing black child than out of one with blond hair and blue eyes."

=== Reopening of case ===
After pressure from Ames's mother Shanika Ondaatjie, the case was re-opened in 2002 under the control of Scotland Yard's Racial and Violent Crimes Taskforce. In 2003 police officers travelled to Ghana in west Africa after a tip-off that Ames may have been taken there. A reward was offered for information, but enquiries proved fruitless. DNA tests on two young Ghanaian men named in relation to the case were negative. There have been periodic appeals for new information since then but with no significant progress.

As of 2020 the case remains open, with Shanika Ondaatjie saying, "Although I have tried to move on, there will always be a part of me that cannot. I need to know what happened to Ames."

== See also ==
- List of people who disappeared mysteriously (1990s)
