= The Fall Line (podcast) =

American true crime podcast

- Genre: True crime
- Language: English

Cast and voices
- Hosted by: Laurah Norton and Brooke Hargrove

Publication
- No. of episodes: 300
- Original release: June 12, 2017
- Provider: Independent, previously Exactly Right Podcast Network
- Updates: Weekly on Wednesdays

Related
- Website: www.thefalllinepodcast.com

The Fall Line is an American true crime podcast that covers lesser-known cases of murder and disappearance from minority communities in Georgia. As of January 2021, it is an independent podcast, after having been part of the Exactly Right Podcast Network for 2 years. The podcast has helped to publicize the disappearance of Dannette and Jeannette Millbrook, a cold case from Augusta, Georgia.

== History ==
In 2017, Laurah Norton decided to make a podcast focusing on cases that had received little attention and had victims from underserved or marginalized communities. She first decided to focus on the Millbrook twins after hearing an episode of Thin Air discussing their case. Together with producer Brooke Gently-Hargrove, she launched The Fall Line on June 12, 2017. The podcast's name refers to the Atlantic Seaboard fall line in Georgia.

== Episodes ==
The first season of the podcast focuses on the Millbrook twins, who disappeared in 1990. The second season deals with the 1989 disappearance of Monica and Michael Bennett, while the third season examines the "Grady babies", seven kidnapped children born at Atlanta's Grady Hospital. The podcast's fourth season largely focuses on cold cases involving LGBT victims and Jane Does. The fifth season debuted in August 2019 and recounts the circumstances of the 1998 disappearance of 8-year-old Shy’kemmia Pate in Unadilla, Georgia. The podcast has since released episodes covering the Jane Doe and unmatched confessions of serial killer Samuel Little, the unsolved Atlanta Lovers' Lane Murders, the cold-case murder of Georgia Leah Moses, and dozens of other cases. The full episode guide for their 300+ episodes covering missing persons, unsolved homicides, and John and Jane Doe unidentified victims can be found on their website, including comprehensive case coverage

== See also ==
- Last Podcast on the Left
