= Disappearance of Steven Clark =

British man missing since 1992

Steven Clark
- Born: 30 August 1969; Colchester, Essex, England
- Disappeared: 28 December 1992 (aged 23); Saltburn-by-the-Sea, North Yorkshire, England
- Status: Missing for 33 years, 10 months and 12 days
- Height: 6 ft 3 in (191 cm)

On 28 December 1992, Steven Clark, a 23‑year‑old man from Marske‑by‑the‑Sea in North Yorkshire, disappeared while walking with his mother near Saltburn‑by‑the‑Sea. He was last seen entering a men's public toilet on the seafront and did not re‑emerge. Several unconfirmed sightings were reported in the days that followed. In 2020, a cold‑case review led police to open a murder inquiry and arrest his parents, who were later released with no further action.

== Background ==
Steven Clark was born on 30 August 1969 in Colchester, Essex, to Doris and Charles Clark, and grew up with one sibling. When he was about two years old, the family were living near Edinburgh, Scotland. During this period he was struck by a lorry in Kirkliston, sustaining serious injuries. The collision left him with permanent physical disabilities, including damage to his left arm, lasting impairment to one leg, and a pronounced limp.

Clark's early education included a period at a school in Kimbolton, Cambridgeshire. In the early 1980s, he moved with his family to South Africa, where he attended the Muriel Brand School near Johannesburg. He remained there for roughly a decade before returning to the United Kingdom. After coming back from South Africa, he lived for a time in Guildford, Surrey, before relocating to Marske-by-the-Sea in the summer of 1991.

Once settled in Marske, Clark worked at the Leonard Cheshire Home, also known as Marske Hall. At the time he went missing, he was attending the Rathbone Society in Redcar, an organisation that supported people with disabilities. Shortly before his disappearance, he had been recognised with the Apprentice of the Year Award.

== Disappearance and investigation ==
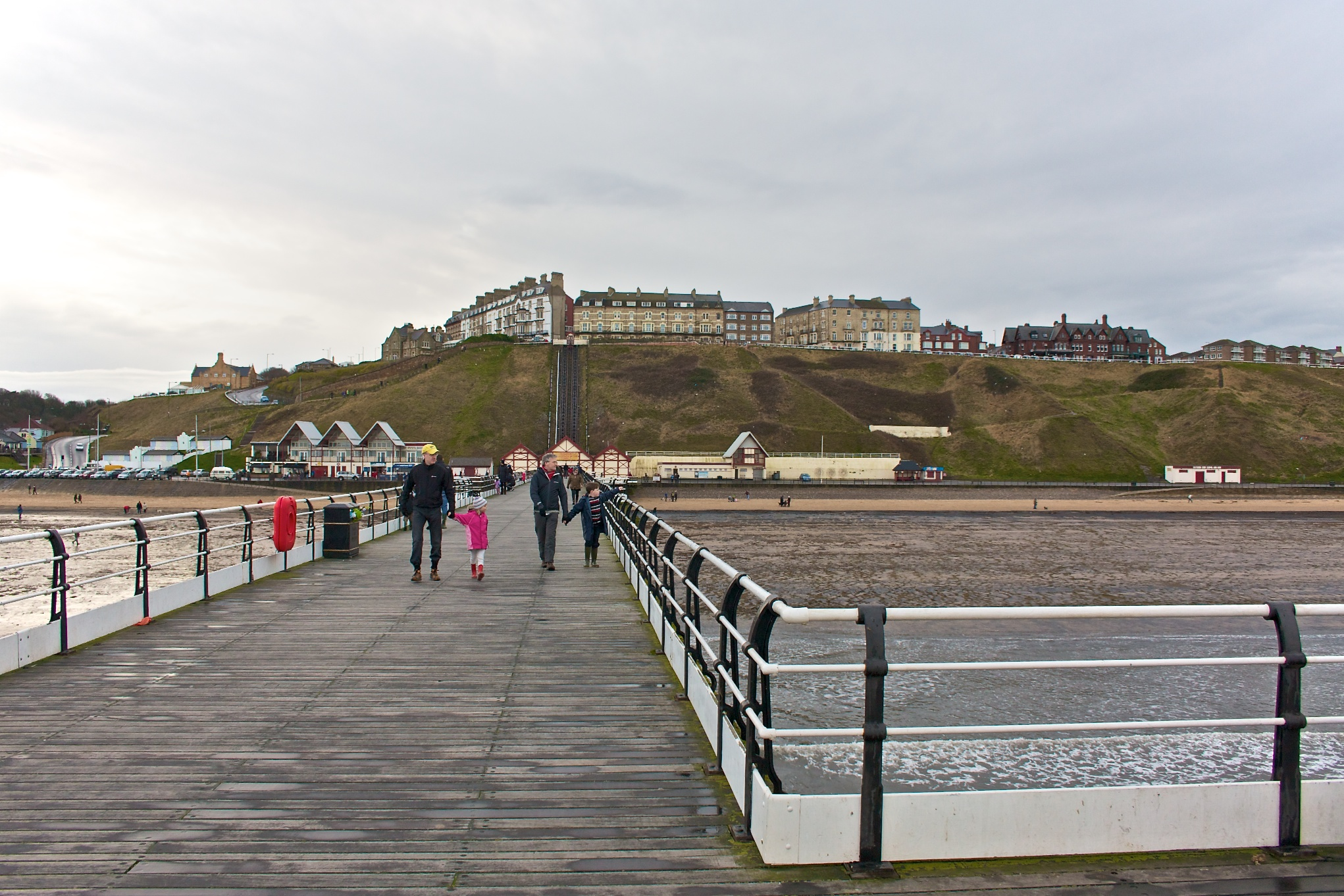
Seafront promenade viewed from pier (photographed in 2012)

On 28 December 1992, Clark went for a walk with his mother along the seafront at Saltburn-by-the-Sea. Shortly after 3 pm, he entered the men's public toilet situated close to the pier along the town's promenade, while his mother went into the adjacent ladies' toilet. When she came out, Clark did not emerge, and she did not see him leave the toilets. Believing he might have decided to walk home on his own, she returned home, but he was not there. When he did not return, the family reported him missing.

On 24 September 1999, police received an anonymous letter stating that Clark was dead and naming a person they alleged to be responsible. The case was reopened by the Cleveland and North Yorkshire Cold Case Unit in 2020, leading detectives to carry out a fresh review of the circumstances surrounding Clark's disappearance. Officers said that, in the absence of any proof that Clark was still alive, they believed he had come to serious harm and launched a murder inquiry. Clark's parents were arrested on suspicion of murder, and police searched their home and garden. They were told four months later that they were no longer under investigation. During this time, filming took place for the ITV documentary Accused of Murdering Our Son: The Steven Clark Story.

=== Potential sightings ===
28 December 1992 – Marske-by-the-Sea

A woman later reported seeing a man she believed to be Clark on Marske High Street, walking towards The Ship Inn. Investigators said the encounter must have taken place before about 3:45 pm because it was still daylight at the time.

30 December 1992 – Redcar

Police received a statement from a man who believed he had seen Clark at around 2 pm near the clock roundabout in Redcar, walking past the Gazette offices towards the town centre. He said the individual appeared to be alone. When officers spoke to him again in 1999, he said he had not seen the person's face clearly but thought the man's walk resembled Clark's, adding that it had been raining heavily and that he had been about 30 yards away.

14 January 1993 – Saltburn-by-the-Sea

A woman reported that at around 5 pm she had seen someone she believed to be Clark while looking out of her living-room window. She said the person was on the opposite side of the road, walking towards Glenside Terrace in Saltburn. She believed she recognised him through her family's link to a local bowling club and because she knew from media coverage that he was missing. She said the individual was accompanied by an older man, described as in his fifties or sixties, bald with grey hair at the sides, of medium build, and wearing glasses.

== See also ==
- List of people who disappeared mysteriously (1990s)
