= Disappearance of Leonard Dirickson =

1998 missing person case in Oklahoma, United States

Leonard Neal Dirickson
- Born: July 25, 1958; Elk City, Oklahoma, U.S.
- Disappeared: March 14, 1998 (aged 39); Strong City, Oklahoma, U.S.
- Status: Missing for 28 years, 4 months and 28 days
- Other name: Lenny
- Occupation: Rancher
- Children: 2
- Parents: Donald M. Dirickson (father); Norma Jean Dirickson (mother)

Leonard Neal "Lenny" Dirickson (born July 25, 1958) is an American rancher who disappeared from Strong City, Oklahoma, on March 14, 1998, at the age of 39. On the morning of his disappearance, an unidentified man arrived at the Dirickson farmhouse in a white pickup truck and asked about buying one of Dirickson's stud horses. Dirickson left with the man to show him the animal and was never seen again.

The horse the visitor asked about had apparently never been advertised for sale, and the man has never been identified. As of February 2026, the whereabouts of Leonard Dirickson remain unknown and the case is listed as an open cold case by the Oklahoma State Bureau of Investigation.

== Background ==
Leonard Neal Dirickson was born in Oklahoma on July 25, 1958, to Donald M. Dirickson and Norma Jean Dirickson.

At the age of 18, Dirickson married his high school sweetheart, Kathy, and the two established a dairy business which they operated from a 800-acre (320 ha) ranch in Strong City. The couple had two children.

The marriage ended in divorce in 1996. Kathy was granted custody of the couple's daughter and moved to Hammon, Oklahoma, while their son Jared remained with his father on the Strong City ranch, where they raised hogs and cattle. Dirickson also owned 15 horses. Most were kept in Elk City, Oklahoma, while at least one was boarded at a stud ranch in Mobeetie, Texas.

Following the divorce, the Diricksons' dairy operation collapsed amid falling prices and rising animal feed expenses. Dirickson sold the business in December 1997, three months before his disappearance. By January 1998, he had taken a job at a metal company in Elk City and told his parents he was happy there.

== Disappearance ==
On the morning of March 14, 1998, Dirickson and his son Jared were having breakfast at their ranch in Strong City when, at approximately 9:00 a.m., a white pickup truck pulled into the driveway.

Dirickson stepped outside to speak with the driver and, after several minutes, returned indoors. He told his son that the visitor had come to view one of his stud horses with the intention of buying it, and that he would be travelling with the man to Elk City and then to Mobeetie, Texas. He assured Jared that he would be back home later that day.

Jared asked to go with him, but his father directed him to remain behind and attend to the livestock. According to Jared, his father showed no sign of fear or apprehension. Dirickson then got into the visitor's pickup truck and left the farm. This was the last time Jared saw his father.

== Potential sightings ==
About two hours after Dirickson left his farm, a waitress reported seeing him having breakfast with a man matching the visitor's description at the Kettle Restaurant in Elk City. She said the pair ordered the buffet breakfast and that the unknown man's behavior gave no sign that anything was out of the ordinary. Both Dirickson's family and a Roger Mills County sheriff assigned to the case expressed skepticism about the reported sighting, noting that Dirickson had already eaten breakfast with his son earlier that morning.

Six months after the disappearance, an anonymous male caller contacted police claiming that Dirickson had been seen in a bar in Amarillo, Texas. He gave a detailed description of Dirickson but declined to identify himself. When officers arrived at the bar, both the caller and the man he believed to be Dirickson had already left. The following day, investigators from the Roger Mills County Sheriff's Department interviewed the bartender, who recalled the caller being present and confirmed his account.

== Investigation ==
Detectives found that the horse the unidentified man had asked about had apparently never been advertised for sale, and Jared Dirickson did not recall his father mentioning any plans to sell his horses around that time. Investigators were also unable to determine how the man knew the location of the ranch, which was in a remote area accessible mainly by back roads.

=== Unidentified man ===
The man last seen with Dirickson was described as a white male in his early forties, about 6 feet 2 inches (1.88 m) tall and 210 pounds (95 kg), with a heavy round face, dark eyes, a long nose and a reddish-brown beard. He was reportedly wearing blue jeans, a striped Western shirt, a blue jacket and a black baseball cap with the words "No Fear" printed on the front.

None of Dirickson's friends, neighbors or family members recognized the man in the composite sketch produced by investigators.

==== Vehicle ====
The vehicle driven by the man was described as a white 1994 Ford F-150 extended cab pickup truck with a yellow tag on the front and possibly a New Mexico license plate.

== Theories ==
=== Foul play ===
One theory in the case is that Dirickson met with foul play while in the company of the unidentified man. Under this scenario, he was robbed and then killed, either in a planned homicide or during an unplanned confrontation. His relatives have said that he was carrying less than $150 in cash on the day he disappeared.

=== Voluntary disappearance ===
Authorities also considered the possibility that Dirickson left voluntarily to begin a new life under another identity, citing his financial problems and a recent divorce that had left him in debt.

Dirickson's family have said that he was close to his son and would have been unlikely to leave on his own. His parents lived in Elk City and he visited them regularly. His last paycheck was never cashed, and there has been no activity on his credit cards since he disappeared.

== See also ==
- Death of Brandon Lawson
- Disappearance of Brian Shaffer
- E.C. Mullendore III
- Jack family disappearance
- List of people who disappeared mysteriously (1990s)
- Murders of Lauria Bible and Ashley Freeman
- Murder of Robert Krentz
- Ray Gricar
