= Disappearance of Revelle Balmain =

Australian missing model and dancer

Revelle Balmain
- Born: Revelle Sabine Balmain; 11 July 1972; Manly, New South Wales, Australia
- Disappeared: 5 November 1994 (aged 22); Bellevue Hill, New South Wales, Australia
- Status: Missing for 32 years and 10 days
- Occupations: Model, dancer, escort

Revelle Sabine Balmain (11 July 1972 – c. 5 November 1994) was an Australian model, dancer and escort who mysteriously disappeared from the Sydney suburb of Kingsford in early November 1994. Balmain has never been heard from since.

== Background ==
Balmain was planning to visit Japan for her fourth six-week tour of cabarets, employed as a hostess. She had been working as a part-time model and as an escort to establish herself, and she was planning to finish escort work so that she could fully concentrate on her entertainment career.

On 5 November 1994 at 4:00 pm, Balmain, who worked as an escort under the name of "Mischa", visited a client in the south-eastern Sydney suburb of Kingsford.

After the two-hour appointment was over, she had planned to meet her friend, Kate Brentnall, for a drink. At 7:15 pm, Balmain rang Brentnall to say that she was about to leave her client and suggested that they meet at the Royal Hotel, Paddington. She did not keep that appointment.

The next day, Balmain had arranged to meet her mother at Newcastle Station for lunch. She never arrived.

== Investigation ==
On the following day, 6 November, Balmain's bag, make-up, diary, credit cards, and keys to her Bellevue Hill flat were found scattered around several Kingsford streets. One of her shell-studded platform shoes was retrieved from one street; the other shoe was found in another street.

Police interviewed Balmain's client, who said that he had driven her to the nearby Red Tomato Inn at about 7.00 pm on the evening of 5 November. As the booking was from 4.00 to 6.00, it was unclear if Balmain had moonlighted for the additional hour. Police officers also questioned the escort agency's owners, but the enquiries resulted in no charges being laid.

After a couple of fruitless weeks of searching, the New South Wales government offered a reward of $100,000 for anyone who could provide information that would lead to the arrest of Balmain's killer. As of 14 May 2021, the reward stood at $1,000,000.

In May 1999, the Deputy State Coroner, John Abernethy, handed down an open finding into Balmain's presumed death. The coronial inquiry, however, suggested that the final client she had visited that day was a primary suspect, but fell short of recommending charges.

Items belonging to Balmain, including her keys, passport, and plane ticket were also found in the near the home of her final client, Gavin Owen Samer. In 2008, forensic evidence suggested that Balmain was murdered in Samer's house. Members of Balmain's family also believe that there were major flaws in the police investigation of the disappearance.

== See also ==
- List of people who disappeared mysteriously (1990s)
