= Disappearance of John and Shelly Markley =

1995 missing person case in Ohio

Johnny Markley Jr.
- Born: July 8, 1959
- Disappeared: December 15, 1995; Bristol Township, Trumbull County, Ohio
- Status: Missing for 30 years, 11 months and 5 days

Shelly Markley
- Born: November 16, 1963
- Disappeared: December 15, 1995; Bristol Township, Trumbull County, Ohio
- Status: Missing for 30 years, 11 months and 5 days

The disappearance of John and Shelly Markley is an unsolved criminal case from Ohio. The Markleys went missing from their home on December 15, 1995, in Bristol Township. They were last seen at approximately 10:36 a.m. at a Bank One drive-thru in Bloomfield, Ohio, where they withdrew $1,000 in cash and were accompanied by an unidentified man. Their children found the home empty that afternoon.

== Disappearance ==
On Friday, December 15, 1995, Shelly and John Markley helped their children get ready for school, with Shelly putting her youngest son on the bus at approximately 8:30am. All other whereabouts of the couple was unknown until approximately 10:36am, when the couple was spotted in Bloomfield, Ohio, roughly 5 miles from their home in Bristol Township, Ohio, through a drive-through window of a Bank One branch. A $1,000 check was made out to cash and signed by Shelly from their account. The bank teller recalled seeing John driving the pickup truck with Shelly in the middle seat and an unidentified man in the passenger seat.

Their children returned home on Friday afternoon to find the house unlocked and empty. There was no note explaining their parents' absence, the coffee pot was still on, John's wristwatch, an item he rarely removed was left on a shelf, Shelly's cigarettes and lighter, items which she normally carried was left behind, a gun cabinet in their master bedroom which was usually kept locked was left opened, and the gun was missing. A small safe was found open with papers inside scattered, and protective tarps for John's 1978 Chevrolet Corvette was also missing.

The following day, with no sign of John and Shelly and the couple failing to show up to the funeral of John's sister, which was scheduled that day, relatives reported the couple missing to authorities.

== Investigation ==
John's 1990 Chevrolet pickup truck was found abandoned and locked on Elm Rd in Warren, Ohio, about 10 miles from their home. The keys were missing, their cellphones were found inside the vehicle, and the tarps removed from the garage was found in the truck bed. The truck was mud covered, which was unusual given John's meticulous care of his vehicles.

=== Late December 1995-1996 ===
Law enforcement along with hundreds of volunteers searched around surrounding land, with helicopters searching through the air. Divers searched nearby lakes and quarry's including Nelson Ledges, Mosquito Lake, and Lake Milton, however no trace of the couple was ever found.

=== Steven Durst ===
In 1996, a man named Steven Durst contacted the Markley family, claiming to have been holding John and Shelly captive for ransom and demanding money. Steven was arrested in a failed money drop and was later convicted to extortion and was sentenced to 4-10 years in prison. Investigators later concluded that he likely had no information about the Markleys'.

=== Later investigations ===
In 1999, the couple was declared legally dead. The case has since remained unsolved, with little to no answers or tips. The case still remains open as of 2015.

== Media coverage ==
- Crime Junkie Podcast July 6, 2025 - MISSING: John & Shelly Markley
- Trace Evidence - Ep. 249 The Disappearance of John & Shelly Markley
- The Trail Went Cold - Ep. 316 John and Shelly Markley

== Theories ==
Due to the continued interest of the disappearances of the couple, some have suggested theories of the couple voluntarily disappearing, or that foul play was involved.

=== Voluntary disappearance ===
Some have suggested that the Markley's have chosen to start a new life elsewhere, being overwhelmed by the tragedies they have recently endured. However, the theory struggles to explain why they would abandon their five children.

=== Foul play ===
Some suggest that the timing of bank withdrawal and the presence of a third unknown person raises questions of a possible kidnapping and robbery.

== See also ==
- List of people who disappeared mysteriously (1990s)
