= Disappearance of Vernon Jones =

1993 missing person case in the United States

Vernon Jones
- Born: Vernon Kent Jones; May 2, 1969; North Carolina, U.S.
- Disappeared: January 2, 1993 (aged 23); New York City, New York, U.S.
- Status: Missing for 33 years, 4 months and 9 days
- Occupation: Actor
- Height: 5 ft 11 in (1.80 m)
- Mother: Sarah Jones

Vernon Kent Jones (born May 2, 1969) is an American man who has been missing since January 2, 1993. Jones was an actor who also went by the name Cameron Jones.

== Disappearance ==
Jones was last seen leaving a party at 273 E. 7th Street in Manhattan, New York City. Jones' friends have said that around 12:30 am on Saturday, Jones had left the apartment to return home to his apartment at 570 Amsterdam Ave, but never arrived. Friends have speculated that he disappeared in between the East River and the subway. Jones was last seen wearing a tan jacket, a red and gray sweater, a white T-shirt, blue jeans, and brown hiking boots.

== Investigation and aftermath ==
Jones' family have searched and continue to search for Jones. They hired a private investigator named Robert Rahn, who took on the case pro bono. Since his involvement, he has managed to get Vernon into the national DNA database, CODIS, by using an old baby tooth that Jones' mother had saved and supplied to him.

== See also ==
- List of people who disappeared mysteriously (1990s)
