= Disappearance of Raisa Räisänen =

Disappearance of a 16-year-old girl in 1999 in Finland

Raisa Räisänen
- Born: Raisa Maria Räisänen; 10 March 1983
- Disappeared: 16 October 1999 (aged 16); Tampere, Finland
- Status: Missing for 27 years and 1 day

Locations
1 22:50 Last known sighting, Sokos, Tampere
2 Multisilta

Raisa Maria Räisänen (born 10 March 1983) was a Finnish teenager who went missing, aged 16, in Tampere, Finland, on 16 October 1999. Her case has been described as the most infamous disappearance in Finnish history, and remains unsolved as of 2026.

Räisänen was declared dead in absentia on the fifth anniversary of her disappearance, in 2004.

== Disappearance ==
22:50 last confirmed sighting of Räisänen outside Sokos department store, Tampere (2012 photo)

On the evening of 16 October 1999, Raisa Räisänen was out celebrating with a friend. She called her boyfriend from her mobile phone at 22:18, indicating that she wanted to join him at a house party in the suburbs, if she could get a lift.

Before doing so, Räisänen and her friend visited a restaurant in the city centre; although aged only 16, they had got in using fake IDs. However, they stayed in the restaurant for only half an hour, leaving when Räisänen's friend received a phone call from her boyfriend, inviting her to a party outside Tampere. Räisänen's friend received a lift to the party from some friends, but Räisänen stayed behind as there was no room for her in the car. Räisänen's friend checked to make sure Räisänen's phone was charged, and gave her some money. The last confirmed sighting of Räisänen was from this time, at 22:50, near the Sokos department store in central Tampere.

After that, there were several unconfirmed reports of someone resembling her. The police believe that CCTV footage from the area also shows her in the city centre at around 23:50, an hour after the last confirmed sighting.

Because of the EU Summit being held in Tampere that day, security had been tightened and there was an increased police presence in the city, with additional police resources brought in from other parts of the country. However, the use of CCTV monitoring was considerably less in 1999 than it is now.

== Investigation ==
Over time, investigators of the National Bureau of Investigation (Finnish: Keskusrikospoliisi) have looked into over 3,000 clues and tips, considered numerous theories, searched extensively in the local lakes and waterways, and appealed to the public through media several times.

The police have pursued the three following main lines of investigation:

1. Older woman: two eyewitnesses saw someone matching Räisänen's description walking with an older, heavy-built woman, heading away from the city centre. After the eyewitnesses lost visual contact, they heard two loud screams. The police have been unable to identify the older woman, or to confirm whether this is connected to Räisänen's disappearance. It was reported in 2022 that the police had considered the possible involvement of murderer Virpi Butt in the case, and whether she could have been the older woman.
2. Taxi: in 2015, a taxi driver came forward saying he had picked up a passenger matching Räisänen's description, who appeared to be cold and afraid, around midnight. He remembered the girl saying "I wonder what will happen to me?" ("Mitenköhän minulle käy?") before a shorter man of possibly Turkish origin got into the car with her. The driver offered to take the girl home, but the man ordered him to drive to the Multisilta suburb around 10 kilometers away, where he dropped both off. This was considered a promising lead, as Finland did not have a significant foreign population in 1999 and eyewitnesses had reported seeing a woman resembling Räisänen speaking with a foreign man in the Tampere city centre on the night of the disappearance. However, the police were unable to locate the male passenger, and excavation attempts in the Multisilta area yielded no results.
3. Vintage car: according to some eyewitnesses, someone matching Räisänen's description either entered, or was possibly bundled against her will, into a black 1950s American car, driven by a 30-something male. A witness came forward in 2010, saying that they had been told by someone that Räisänen had been drugged by two men and taken to a hall facility or a house in Kangasala with an antique car, where they had killed her and buried the corpse in the vicinity. The police investigated the two men but found no evidence of their involvement.

The police continue to investigate the disappearance as a homicide. The case was initially considered manslaughter, but is today being investigated as murder. According to Finnish law, murder never expires under the statute of limitations, whereas manslaughter expires after 20 years.

The head of investigation Jussi Luoto stated in November 2022 that the case is not currently being actively investigated, but authorities are responding to both old and new leads as required. He also stated that all of the three main lines of investigation are still equally considered.

== Later developments and connection to Virpi Butt ==
It was reported in 2022 that the National Bureau of Investigation had suspected Virpi Butt, a convicted murderer who had died in 2021, of having killed Räisänen. Butt was active in the area of Tampere at the time of Räisänen's disappearance, and she matched the eyewitnesses' descriptions of an older, heavy-built woman whom had been seen walking with Räisänen. Butt, who had become known to the Finnish public for appearing on the television series Gladiaattorit, was reportedly recognized by one of the witnesses as the woman accompanying Räisänen. It was also reported that a street musician, who was an acquaintance of Butt, had told the police that he had run into Butt in Tampere in either 1999 or 2000. According to the street musician, Butt pulled a human head out of her backpack and presented it to him. He initially believed the head to be that of a mannequin, and did not contact the police until 2006. Police found this testimony to be consistent with Butt's history, as in 2002 she and her boyfriend had dismembered the 29-year-old programmer Kari Anttonen and proceeded to present his head to other people. However, the police have been unable to positively confirm or exclude Butt as a suspect, and have stated that the emergence of more suspects is possible.

== See also ==
- List of people who disappeared mysteriously (1990s)
