= Disappearances of Paul and Sarah Skiba and Lorenzo Chivers =

1999 missing persons case in Colorado

Coordinates: 39.824157°N 105.040688°W

- Left to right: Sarah Skiba, Paul Skiba, and Lorenzo Chivers
- Date: February 7, 1999
- Duration: Missing for 27 years, 8 months and 12 days
- Location: 7010 Raleigh Street, #5 Westminster, Colorado, U.S. (Note: Some sources, such as the National Center for Missing and Exploited Children, list Granby as the location from which the three disappeared. The official Westminster Police Department Cold Case file, however, lists the Tuff Movers address in Westminster as the missing location.)
- Type: Disappearance
- Missing: Paul Carroll Skiba; Sarah Arielle Skiba; Lorenzo DeShawn Chivers

Paul Carroll Skiba (born February 23, 1960), his daughter Sarah Arielle Skiba (born July 27, 1989), and Lorenzo DeShawn Chivers (born November 5, 1962), an employee of Skiba's moving business, disappeared under mysterious circumstances in Westminster, Colorado, United States, on February 7, 1999.

On the day they went missing, Sarah accompanied her father Paul, who owned the Tuff Movers company in Westminster, on a job along with his employee Chivers. The three were last seen in Morrison that evening. Sarah was reported missing by her mother after Paul failed to return her home from her weekend visitation; at this time, it was discovered that Paul and Chivers were also missing. A movers' truck located at the Tuff Movers lot was subsequently discovered with bullet holes in its side, blood evidence, as well as a portion of human scalp near its windshield; a metal extension ramp for the truck was also missing from the lot.

The disappearances of the Skibas and Chivers received national attention, and were profiled on The Montel Williams Show, America's Most Wanted, and by journalist Nancy Grace. In 2016, their names were included on a list of missing persons as part of a Colorado Senate bill petitioning for a statewide Missing Persons Day, which was signed into law on February 5 of that year. As of 2026, the whereabouts of the Skibas and Chivers are still unknown, though law enforcement suspects foul play in their disappearances, and their case has been officially reclassified as a homicide investigation. (Note: Entries for Paul Skiba, Sarah Skiba, and Lorenzo Chivers on The Doe Network each state that their disappearances are being investigated as homicides. The official Colorado Bureau of Investigation Cold Case File page on the case states, "[t]he case has been reclassified as a homicide investigation.")

== Background ==
=== Paul and Sarah Skiba ===
Paul Carroll Skiba was born February 23, 1960. On July 27, 1989, Michelle Russell and Paul Skiba's daughter Sarah Arielle Skiba was born. Paul and Michelle were divorced. Paul was the owner of Tuff Movers, a local moving company in the Westminster area, and shared custody of Sarah. A custody agreement allowed Sarah to spend every other weekend with her father. At the time of Paul's disappearance he was living with Teresa Donovan, an on-again-off-again girlfriend who had recently given birth to a baby boy.

=== Lorenzo Chivers ===
Lorenzo DeShawn Chivers was born November 5, 1962.At the time of his disappearance, Chivers had a 15 year old son and 12 year old daughter and was separated from his wife, but had discussed reconciliation. Chivers had met Paul Skiba through Donovan, who had been a roommate with Chivers's sister.

=== Circumstances around disappearance ===
Paul had told friends the week before his disappearance that he questioned if he had actually fathered Donovan's child, and said he would often "come home from work to find [Donovan] still in bed or partying next door with a neighbor, leaving Sarah to take care of the baby." Paul also mentioned his plans to kick Donovan out of his home and sue for full custody should a paternity test prove the child was his. Sarah spent the weekend of February 5, 1999, with her father, Paul Carroll Skiba, at his home in Thornton, Colorado.

== Disappearance ==
On Sunday, February 7, 1999, Paul's mother Sharon received a phone call from Donovan claiming that Paul did not return home that day from a job he scheduled with his employee and co-worker Lorenzo DeShawn Chivers. Sarah accompanied both on a job in Westminster that evening, departing for the Tuff Movers store, located at 72nd Avenue and Raleigh Street, around 5:30 p.m. The three were last seen at approximately 6:00 p.m. in Morrison. At 6:22 p.m., Sarah made a call. When Paul did not return home, Teresa phoned the police department, but stated they "did not take her seriously," after which Sharon placed a call regarding Paul's absence. Some time later, Michelle phoned police, notifying them that Sarah did not return from her weekend stay with Paul. On February 8, Chivers' son called his mother and told her that his father did not return home.

=== Immediate aftermath ===
On Monday, February 8, Jerry Bybee, another of Paul's employees, arrived at the Tuff Movers store and noticed that the company's large moving truck was parked in an unusual place and position. Bybee recalled: "Paul was a neat freak, anal about everything, so I'm thinking, 'Oh, I can't wait to hear why the truck's parked like that' — because Paul would have a story." Bybee also noted that the lock on the front gate was changed, rendering him unable to enter the parking lot. After Paul and Chivers did not arrive at the Tuff store at their usual time, Bybee phoned police.

Three days later, on February 11, law enforcement entered the Tuff Movers lot with Bybee assisting them; there, Bybee noticed a puddle of motor oil partly covered with a piece of plywood in the van lot. He later stated that he felt the investigating officer "destroyed more evidence than he was willing to look at." On February 13, Paul's friend Rich Lesmeister received a phone call from Donovan notifying him that Paul, Sarah, and Lorenzo were missing; he stated this was the first he had been made aware of their disappearances.

That afternoon, Lesmeister and his wife Carol met with Sharon at the Tuff Movers lot to further investigate the premises themselves; Lesmeister, an auto mechanic, had recently worked on a 1978 Chevrolet moving truck at the lot. Lesmeister and Carol climbed over the fence and found multiple bullet holes in the side of the 1978 Chevrolet truck. The exterior of the truck also had what appeared to be a large bloodstain, and a chunk of what appeared to be a human scalp was lying near the windshield.

=== Investigation ===
Law enforcement initially treated the case as a kidnapping, assuming that Paul had taken Sarah and run away with her. Upon further investigation, the Colorado Bureau of Investigation (CBI) found evidence of blood covering the back of the truck and cab via luminol. DNA analysis proved the blood to be a mixture of Sarah's and Paul's. The large amount of blood led authorities to believe both were dead. On February 17, 1999, a vehicle belonging to Chivers was discovered parked at an apartment complex at 3809 68th Avenue in Westminster, several blocks from the Tuff Movers lot. Ten days later, on February 27, a vehicle belonging to Paul was discovered in an apartment complex parking lot at 3129 Arkansas Avenue in Denver. In March 1999, five weeks after the disappearances, Thornton police and the CBI formally stated they had evidence suggesting foul play.

A witness claimed to have heard a woman screaming at the Tuff Movers lot the night of the disappearances, February 7. Other witnesses later told police that the truck in question was seen leaving the lot between seven and eight times that night, before returning for good around approximately midnight. This led police to determine that the bodies of Chivers, Paul, and Sarah had been transported in the truck and could "not be more than a couple of hours away." An extension ramp was missing from another truck, leading authorities to suspect the killer(s) may have used it to sink the three's remains in a lake, as vegetation discovered in the truck radiator indicated it was driven near a body of water. Search canines were used in an attempt to trace the bodies, and NecroSearch, a company specializing in recovery of human remains, assisted in searches of lakes in the region.

As of February 2024, there was a cash reward of $4,000 USD offered for any information.

In February 2025, Detective Troy Gordonier of the Westminster Police Department announced new discoveries in the case. He said police discovered that parts of the truck were missing including a two-piece ramp, blankets, and straps. Gordonier also said that they reanalyzed existing evidence and discovered new DNA, which they were working to test, and also added authorities had started re-interviewing persons of interest and witnesses. Along with the announcement, photos of the moving truck were released. As of February 2025, authorities were offering a reward of $10,000 USD for information that helped solve the case.

== Publicity ==
Donovan appeared on The Montel Williams Show to speak regarding the disappearances. She also appeared on a subsequent MSNBC special, during which she disclosed that law enforcement had told her she failed a polygraph examination. "I'd never hurt them," she told the MSNBC interviewer. "I'd never hurt them. The police have tried to say that I killed them or I had them killed." Donovan claimed in this special that Paul was killed by drug dealers who rented parking spaces from the Tuff Movers lot, and whose vehicles he had recently towed. The case has received coverage from Fox's America's Most Wanted and journalist Nancy Grace.

== Legacy ==
In 2016, the Skiba and Chivers names were included on a list of missing persons as part of a Colorado Senate bill petitioning for a statewide Missing Persons Day, which was signed into law on February 5 of that year.

== See also ==
- List of people who disappeared mysteriously (1990s)
