= Disappearance of Michael Dunahee =

Missing child from British Columbia, Canada

Coordinates: 48°26′15.75″N 123°21′37.9″W

Michael Dunahee
- Born: Michael Wayne Dunahee; May 12, 1986; Victoria, British Columbia, Canada
- Disappeared: March 24, 1991 (aged 4); Blanshard Elementary School Playground
- Status: Missing for 35 years, 7 months and 13 days
- Education: Blanshard Elementary School
- Occupation: Student
- Parent(s): Bruce Dunahee; Crystal Dunahee

Michael Wayne Dunahee (born May 12, 1986) is a Canadian missing child who disappeared from the playground at Blanshard Elementary School in Victoria, British Columbia, on March 24, 1991, and has never been seen since. He was last seen that day around 12:30 pm at the playground as his mother, Crystal Dunahee, was participating in a women's flag football practice where his father was a spectator. Although he vanished meters from his parents, no witnesses to his disappearance have ever been identified.

Michael's disappearance became one of the largest police investigations in Canadian history, and over 11,000 tips have been received by the police. However, despite a large number of tips and a CA$100,000 reward, police still do not have any solid leads in the case.

== Disappearance ==
Locations
1 Blanshard School.

On Sunday, March 24, 1991, Michael Dunahee and his family went to Blanshard Elementary School for his mother Crystal's flag football practice. Dunahee was wearing a blue hooded jacket, a Teenage Mutant Ninja Turtles T-shirt, rugby pants and blue sneakers. The family arrived at the school around 12:30 pm. Upon arrival, Dunahee asked his mother if he could go to the playground, which was near the field where the football practice was taking place. Despite having a gut feeling that "something wasn't quite right," Crystal allowed him to walk to the playground by himself, but told him that once he got there he had to "stay there and wait for Daddy to come." However, when Dunahee's father came to the playground, the boy was not there. Around fifty people began to look for Dunahee, and his parents immediately notified police.

== Investigation ==
=== Initial search efforts ===
At the time, the investigation into Dunahee's disappearance became one of the largest in Canadian history, and remains one of the largest today. Since he disappeared so quickly from a public place, police quickly classified his case as an abduction rather than a missing child case, and all detectives from the Victoria Police Department (VicPD) were called in. Hundreds of tips began coming in every hour from across North America, which during that time had to be written on carbon paper and sorted out manually. Police believe that if they had current technology, such as video surveillance, DNA techniques, and a computer system to sort out tips, the case might have been solved.

Victoria detectives investigated known sex offenders and interviewed anyone who had been in the area around the time of Dunahee's disappearance, but were unable to find much information except a witness report that "a man in his late 40s or early 50s" with a brown van was near the playground. A month after Dunahee was last seen, police staged a re-enactment of his disappearance at Blanshard Elementary using a brown van, but were unable to produce any new leads.

=== Reported sightings ===
In 2006, reports of a young man who physically resembled Dunahee and was living in the Interior of British Columbia since 1990 breathed new life into the case. However, the man was confirmed by DNA testing not to be Dunahee. Three years later, police in Milwaukee, Wisconsin, found Dunahee's missing person poster at the home of Vernon Seitz, who confessed to his psychiatrist that he had murdered a child in 1959 when he was aged 12 and knew of another child killing. Seitz was later found dead by Milwaukee police, apparently from natural causes. In 2011, with the twentieth anniversary of Dunahee's disappearance approaching, police were notified of a man living in Chase, British Columbia, who looked like Dunahee, but DNA testing later confirmed that he was not.

In 2013, a man with the username "Canuckels" posted on the message boards of the Vancouver Canucks' official website claiming that police were coming for a DNA test. They requested a blood sample from a man in Surrey who they believed could be Dunahee. However, on September 9, the VicPD stated that the Surrey man was not Dunahee after DNA testing was done.

In 2020, a TikToker by the name of "Shangerdanger" reportedly found the shirt Dunahee was said to be wearing at the time of his disappearance. The rare Teenage Mutant Ninja Turtle shirt was found submerged underwater, but after Dunahee's family contacted the TikToker, they saw the shirt and realized it was not the exact same shirt he was wearing during his disappearance.

=== Later developments ===
As of 2021 Dunahee's case remained open, with both the police and Michael's family remaining hopeful for a resolution. In 2021 the Victoria Police Department released an age-enhanced sketch of Michael and launched an online tip portal, with Constable Cam MacIntyre stating that over 10,000 tips have been received since 1991.

In 2025, the Victoria Police Department released a public appeal for help to solve Dunahee's disappearance, noting that "[a]ll it could take is just one person to bring Michael home.”

== Impact ==
Many Victoria residents recalled the day of Dunahee's disappearance as a "loss of innocence" for the city, as the fact that a child had been abducted in their community came as a shock. Fears and concerns about child abduction quickly began to rise among parents, kids and schools in the months after the disappearance. Dunahee's mother became an advocate for missing children's issues in British Columbia, and has served as the president of Child Find British Columbia. In 2002, she lent her voice to support the Royal Canadian Mounted Police (RCMP) in calls to introduce an Amber alert system in the province, as she believed that her son would have been found if such a program had existed in 1991. The system has since been implemented in most regions of Canada. The community of Esquimalt, part of the Greater Victoria metropolitan area, holds an annual charity event called the Michael Dunahee "Keep the Hope Alive" Fun Run/Walk to raise money for Child Find. This event is organized by his sister Caitlin.

== See also ==
- List of people who disappeared mysteriously (1990s)
