= Disappearance of Jared Negrete =

1991 disappearance of a 12-year-old in California, United States

Jared Negrete
- The last known photo of Negrete, found on his camera shortly after his disappearance.
- Born: Jared Michael Negrete; September 11, 1978
- Disappeared: July 19, 1991 (aged 12); San Bernardino County, California
- Status: Missing for 35 years, 1 month and 24 days
- Height: 5 ft 2 in (1.57 m)
- Parents: Felipe Negrete (father); Linda Negrete (mother)

Jared Michael Negrete (born September 11, 1978) is a missing person who was last seen on July 19, 1991, during a Boy Scouts camping trip at Mount San Gorgonio in the San Bernardino Mountains of Southern California. Search personnel recovered some of his personal effects, including a camera and food wrappers, during an extensive search of the area that lasted 16 days. The camera contained the last known photo of Negrete, showing his eyes and nose, taken after his disappearance.

== Disappearance ==
On July 18, 1991, Negrete went with five fellow Boy Scouts and a troop leader on a camping trip, his first overnight backpacking trip. The next day, on the trail to the summit of Mount San Gorgonio, Negrete had trouble keeping up with the other scouts due to lack of experience with hiking. The scout troop decided to hike ahead of Negrete at a faster pace, leaving him behind. He got separated from his group, and other hikers and witnesses later reported that he was seen taking shortcuts in the switchback sections, which led to speculation that he possibly fell down the mountainside or took a wrong trail and got lost. It was reported that the scout troop leader interacted with hikers who expressed concern for Negrete. He told them that he would check on his scout on the way back down the summit with the rest of the troop.

Negrete was last seen at 6 pm by another hiker, a Santa Ana firefighter, who warned him about straying from the trail and told him to stay on marked paths. He was last seen wearing green Boy Scout pants, with a tan-colored T-shirt (possibly a Boy Scout-style T-shirt), and with black high-top tennis shoes. The scout leader conducted a search for Negrete before hiking 12 miles (19 km) in darkness to report his disappearance that night.

== Investigation and aftermath ==
The search for Negrete began at 7 am on July 20, 1991, with authorities using helicopters and on-foot personnel to scour the area. Searchers described the location where Negrete disappeared as "one of loose rocks, slippery slopes and, along the ravines and lower slopes, thick vegetation." Tracker Francis Lorson stated: "If you stay on the trail, there's no problem, but the minute you get off, you can get swept down in a rockslide." On July 21, search personnel discovered footprints believed to match Negrete's tennis shoes at about the 10,000-foot level.

On July 24, the firefighter who last saw Negrete on July 19 assisted searchers and led them to the location of their encounter on Vivian Creek Trail, at the 10,200-foot level.

On July 27, search personnel located Negrete's disposable Kodak camera 45 feet (14 m) off Vivian Creek Trail. Authorities developed twelve snapshots from the camera. Most photographs depicted the surrounding landscape and were taken before his disappearance, but the last image was a close-up of Negrete's face taken after he disappeared; only his eyes and nose are visible in the photograph and it was possibly taken at night, as the camera flash activated. The search combed the area of the 11,500-foot Mt. San Gorgonio. Personnel also found beef jerky and candy wrappers; authorities stated that there was evidence Negrete had the jerky when he disappeared.

On August 4, after 16 days, the search for Negrete was officially called off by authorities; he was presumed dead with the chance of survival "almost nil".

Negrete's family held a memorial service for him on September 7, 1991, in Hacienda Heights. The service was attended by 500 relatives and fellow members of the local Mormon church.

== See also ==
- List of people who disappeared mysteriously (1990s)
