= Disappearance of Paige Renkoski =

1990 disappearance in central Michigan

Paige Renkoski
- Born: Paige Marie Renkoski; February 2, 1960; Lansing, Michigan, U.S.
- Disappeared: May 24, 1990 (aged 30) westbound on Interstate 96, near Fowlerville, Michigan
- Status: Missing for 36 years, 3 months and 27 days
- Height: 5 ft 6 in (1.68 m)
- Parents: Carl Renkoski (father); Ardis Renkoski (mother)
- Relatives: Michele Renkoski-Hollis (sister)

Paige Marie Renkoski (born February 2, 1960) was a substitute schoolteacher from Okemos, Michigan who disappeared on May 24, 1990. She was last seen talking to two men on the shoulder of Interstate 96 near Fowlerville, Michigan. Renkoski's disappearance is one of Michigan's longest running cold cases. Her vehicle was reported abandoned on I-96. Although the responding officer discovered Renkoski's car was still running and her purse and shoes were in the vehicle, the police did not process this as suspicious; they merely had the vehicle towed.

== Disappearance ==
At around 11:30 a.m. on May 24, 1990, Paige Renkoski drove her mother to Detroit Metropolitan Airport and then visited a friend in Canton, Michigan. She was seen between 2:30 p.m. and 2:45 p.m. at a store that has since closed down, west of Interstate 275 in Canton, where she bought a beer that was later found in her car. The store clerk remembered seeing Renkoski because she was wearing "distinctive multi-colored, loose-fitting, flower-patterned pants and a distinctive necklace".

Renkoski was last seen on the shoulder of Interstate 96 near Fowlerville, talking to two African American men who were standing next to a maroon-colored minivan. According to witnesses, she had seemed upset and one of the men was seen putting his hand on her shoulder as if to comfort her. Hours later, the 1986 Oldsmobile Cutlass Calais she had been driving was found still idling, with her shoes and purse inside. Many people claimed to have seen Renkoski driving west on I-96. One was a woman who said she might have seen her at a rest-stop kiosk. Others include two long-haul truck drivers who reported seeing a blonde haired woman matching Renkoski's description and may have passed her when she was driving her vehicle on I-96. Renkoski was last seen wearing a white silk shirt, with a long beaded necklace, and silk patterned slacks.

== Investigation ==
Investigators found Renkoski's Oldsmobile, but it was not processed as a crime scene because it was considered by the responding officer to be an abandoned vehicle. The car was undamaged and the door was unlocked; it was later towed. Someone had reported seeing Renkoski near her car at about 3:00 pm, and officers did not respond to the scene until after 6:00 pm. They then learned that Renkoski was in fact missing and the car was not abandoned. When examining the vehicle, police found several fingerprints and palm prints, but a match has yet to be identified on any law enforcement databases. Renkoski was engaged to be married at the time of her disappearance, but had been reported to have been having problems with her fiancé at the time. He was quickly ruled out as a suspect.

In 2009, detectives told reporters that they had a list of six potential suspects, one of whom had been murdered in Detroit in 1999. They did not release his name, but noted that he did once have a burgundy minivan similar to the one witnesses reported seeing on the day Paige disappeared.

In May 2011, authorities began searching a pond in Handy Township using ground-penetrating radar. A woman reported seeing a pair of cement-covered boots there around the time of Renkoski's disappearance. In November 2011, the FBI, state and local police began a dig operation in Conway Township in search of Renkoski's remains. Cadaver dogs identified the site a week before the dig started. Investigators went to the property after reviewing a 1999 case file, which included a "hand drawn map indicating Renkoski's remains were buried there".

The police have ruled the case a homicide, even though her body has never been located and no one has been charged in her disappearance or death. Cold-case investigators of the Livingston County Sheriff's Department continue to work on the case.

In 2025, Lt. Matt Young of the Livingston County Cold Case Team stated that, "This case will be solved on somebody who gives a deathbed confession (or) somebody who is involved in the criminal justice system who wants to make things right [...] It's not going to be something that's solved based strictly on the evidence that we still have here today. It's going to be something that someone has to come forward and say they did it, or know who did it, or somebody who happens across Paige's body through construction of a new build, or a roadway, or something like that. Those are really the only options we have left."

== Aftermath ==
Michigan Crime Stoppers is offering a cash reward of up to $2,500 for any information about Renkoski.

On June 27, 1990, workers began erecting billboards featuring Renkoski along Interstate 96; a total of 25 billboard ads were planned. In May 2013, authorities announced that they would be erecting billboards featuring Renkoski and two other missing women.

On February 2, 2018, a dual memorial service was held for Renkoski and her mother, who died in December 2017.

Renkoski's disappearance is discussed in a book about the death of Linda Sobek entitled Death of a Model by true crime author Clifford L. Linedecker.

== See also ==
- List of people who disappeared mysteriously (2000–present)
