= Manuel Negrete =

Manuel Negrete may refer to:

- Manuel Negrete de la Torre (1793-1818), Spanish noble and politician
- Manuel Negrete (shooting) (1946-1973), Chilean individual that was allegedly killed by Armed Forces
- Manuel Negrete (footballer) (born 1959), Mexican football manager and former player
