= Disappearance of Erin Marie Gilbert =

American disappearance case

Erin Marie Gilbert
- Born: May 4, 1971; Everett, Washington, U.S.
- Disappeared: July 1, 1995 (aged 24); Girdwood, Alaska, U.S.
- Status: Missing for 31 years and 26 days
- Height: 5 ft 11 in (1.80 m)

Locations
1 Girdwood Forest Fair

Erin Marie Gilbert (May 4, 1971 – disappeared July 1, 1995) is an American woman who vanished while attending the Girdwood Forest Fair in Girdwood, Alaska. Gilbert, who had previously resided in California, had moved to Anchorage, Alaska, where she lived with her sister and worked as a nanny. At the time she disappeared, Gilbert was on a first date with a man, David Combs, whom she had met at a bar in Anchorage several days prior. She was last seen at the fairground's beer garden at approximately 6:00 p.m. on Saturday, July 1, 1995.

Despite search efforts of family and Alaska State Troopers, no traces of Gilbert have ever been found. Her disappearance received renewed interest in 2017.

== Background ==
Gilbert was born and raised in Everett, Washington. After high school, she relocated with her father to Baltimore, Maryland, where she attended community college, studying English. Prior to moving to Alaska, Gilbert had relocated to San Francisco, where she worked for a period as a model. In 1994, Gilbert relocated to Alaska, where she resided with her elder sister, Stephanie, and her husband at the Elmendorf Air Force Base. There, Gilbert took a job working as a nanny for a family who were acquaintances of her sister.

== Disappearance ==
On July 1, 1995, Gilbert accompanied David Combs—a man whom she had met several days prior at a bar called Chilkoot Charlie's in Anchorage—to the Girdwood Forest Fair in Girdwood, Alaska, a village south of Anchorage. The two left Anchorage at approximately 4:00 p.m. Gilbert was last seen at the fair's beer garden with Combs before they left at approximately 6:00 p.m. At the time, she was wearing a black leather jacket, a black and white shirt, mountain boots, and black jeans.

By Combs' account, he and Gilbert returned to his car, but found the battery dead as he had left the headlights on. He claimed he told Gilbert he was going to a nearby friends' home to get help, and walked for around two hours, but was unable to locate his friend's residence. When he returned, Gilbert was no longer at the car. According to Combs, he assumed Gilbert had returned to the fair, and found that he was able to start the car engine. He then returned to the fairgrounds and searched for Gilbert unsuccessfully until approximately 1:00 a.m.

== Investigation ==
Stephanie and her family searched the Girdwood Forest Fairgrounds the following morning, July 2, as well as the surrounding woods, after receiving a phone call from Combs inquiring about whether or not Gilbert had made it home the night before. Alaska State Troopers organized a large search utilizing helicopters and search dogs, but were unsuccessful in recovering any sign of Gilbert in the vicinity of the fair. The Alaska Mountain Rescue troops and Nordic Ski Patrol also helped in search efforts.

== Later developments ==
In 2017, police lieutenant Randy McPherron commented publicly on the case: "We don't know for sure what happened, if this was foul play or not -- we just don't know. We don't have any witnesses, we don't have any human remains, we don't have a crime scene, we don't have much of anything, so it's gonna be very hard, but like I said, somebody knows something." At this time, a $35,000 reward was offered by Gilbert's family for information regarding her disappearance. Combs refused to speak to press when contacted at the time.

== Media depictions ==
In 2019, the podcast Alaska Unsolved created a 7-episode series on her case. In 2020, her case was profiled on the podcast The Vanished.

== See also ==
- List of people who disappeared mysteriously: post-1970
