= Disappearance of Katheryne Eggleston =

Unsolved 1993 disappearance of 22 year-old from Portland

Katheryne Eggleston
- Born: Katheryne Scott Eggleston; May 4, 1971; Redmond, Oregon, U.S.
- Disappeared: August 2, 1993 (aged 22); Lloyd District, Portland, Oregon, U.S. 45.531270°N 122.658160°W
- Status: Missing for 33 years and 29 days
- Education: Oregon State University
- Height: 5 ft 4 in (1.63 m)

Katheryne Scott Eggleston (May 4, 1971 – disappeared August 2, 1993) is an American woman who disappeared under mysterious circumstances in Portland, Oregon, United States. Her disappearance was profiled extensively in The Last Time We Saw Her, a 2012 nonfiction book by Robert Scott chronicling the murder of Brooke Wilberger as well as several other Oregon missing person cases. Eggleston's disappearance is considered one of the most notorious cold cases in Portland history.

Eggleston, a recent graduate of Oregon State University, had taken a job working for Allnet, a telecommunications company based in Lake Oswego, Oregon. After attending a business meeting in Portland on the morning of August 2, 1993, she was scheduled to make several sales appointments in the city. She was last seen around 2:15 p.m. in the former Port of Portland building, located at 700 Northeast Multnomah Street. Several people witnessed her making telephone calls in the building’s lobby. Witnesses stated that she appeared nervous, while her client stated he saw her exiting an elevator in the company of an unknown man. Eggleston’s unlocked car was discovered the following morning in an industrial parking lot 9 miles (14 km) away. Her purse and most of her belongings were in the car, though her passport was never found.

The investigation by Portland law enforcement into Eggleston's disappearance was significantly focused on her elder sister's upcoming court sentencing regarding tax evasion. Detectives theorized that Eggleston may have fled intentionally to avoid testifying against her sister, though her family repeatedly denied any connection between the two incidents. As of 2025, Eggleston's whereabouts remain unknown.

== Background ==
Katheryne Scott Eggleston was born in Redmond, Oregon on May 4, 1971 to Paul (July 14, 1935 – March 28, 2017), a former Seattle high school teacher and superintendent of Redmond School District in Redmond, Oregon, and Heather Eggleston (née Scott; September 14, 1935 – July 15, 2011), an elementary school teacher. One of four daughters, she was raised in Redmond, and went by the nickname "Katie." Eggleston attended Oregon State University (OSU) in Corvallis, where she was a member of the Alpha Chi Omega sorority. She graduated from OSU in the spring of 1993, earning a Bachelor of Arts degree in English.

== Disappearance ==
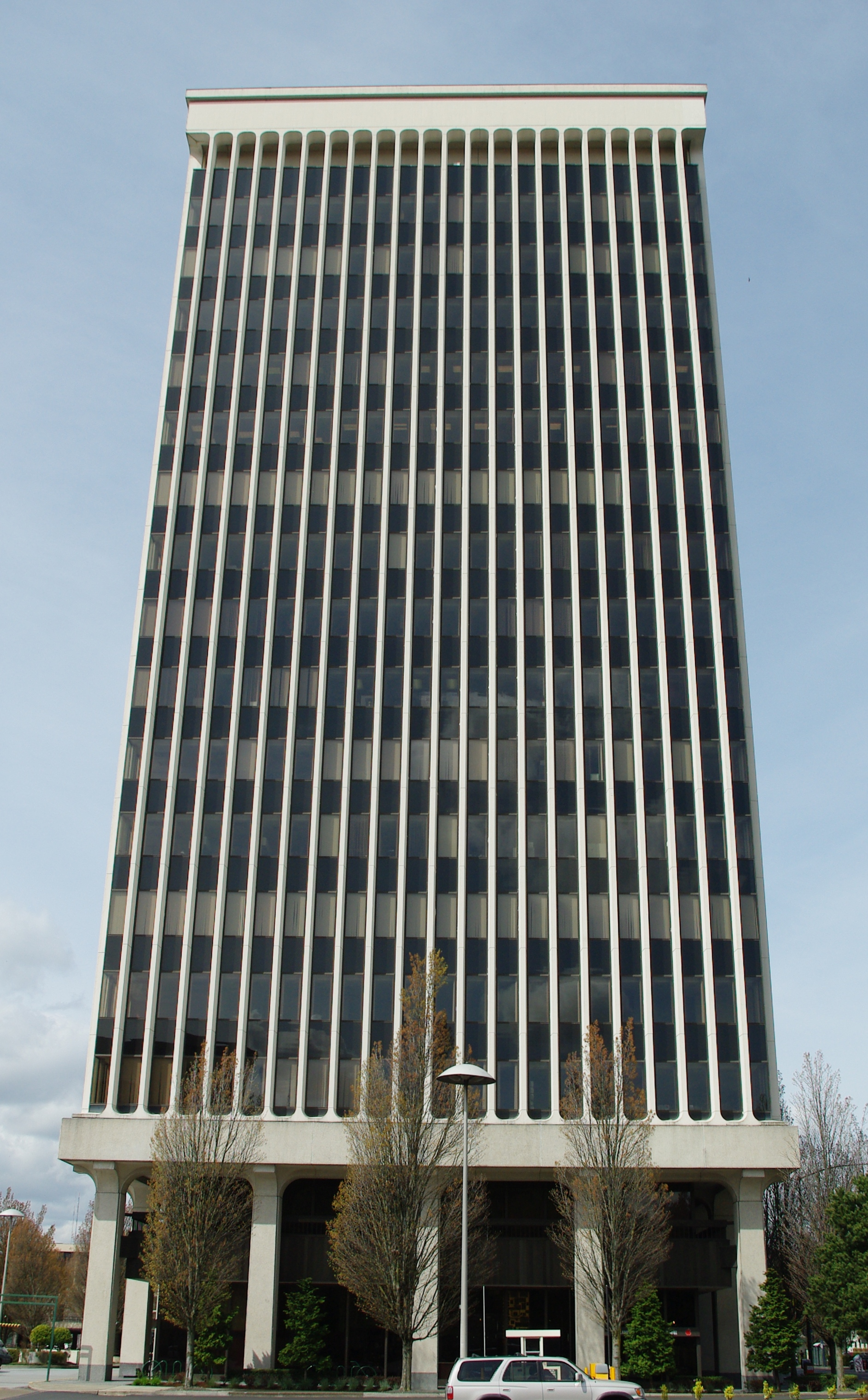
Eggleston was last seen in the former Port of Portland Building in northeast Portland

After graduating from college, Eggleston relocated to Gresham, Oregon, a suburb of Portland, where she resided with her older sister Janet, then aged 37. She took a job working for Allnet Communication Services, a telecommunications company based in Lake Oswego, working as a salesperson. On the morning of August 2, 1993, she departed the company's Lake Oswego office to attend a business meeting in Portland, before stopping at several businesses on Northeast Whitaker Way. It was Eggleston's first day making sales visits alone. She stopped at a bank and gasoline station before having lunch at a Burger King restaurant near Lloyd Center in the Lloyd District.

Shortly after, Eggleston arrived at the 700 Building (then the Port of Portland Building) at 700 Northeast Multnomah Street, approximately two blocks from the Lloyd Center, for a business appointment. She was seen making phone calls in the building lobby, and five individual witnesses who saw her there stated she appeared "preoccupied and worried." At approximately 2:15 p.m., the man with whom Eggleston had had her appointment witnessed her exiting an elevator in the lobby with a man wearing a blue blazer. The client described the unknown man as having "dark hair and a dark complexion." This was the last time she was seen.

== Investigation ==
=== Initial searches ===
Eggleston's absence was first noted when she failed to return to Allnet's Lake Oswego office, where she was supposed to meet her advisor at 5:00 p.m. At around 5:00 p.m., a witness named John Davis sighted Eggleston's grey Volkswagen Golf still in the Port of Portland Building parking lot. When Eggleston failed to return to the home she shared with her sister Janet, Janet notified their father, who traveled to the Portland area from Redmond on August 3.

In the early morning hours of August 3, a security guard at an industrial complex located at Northeast 122nd Avenue and Airport Way discovered Eggleston's Volkswagen Golf parked in the lot, approximately 9 miles (14 km) from the Port of Portland Building where it was last seen, near the Portland International Airport. The doors to the car were unlocked, and all of its windows were rolled down, with the keys still in the ignition. Her purse and its contents were in the car, including a checkbook, credit cards, and a small amount of cash, though her passport was absent. Eggleston's parents noted that she had retrieved her passport from their residence in Redmond while visiting 10 days prior. On August 6, fields located nearby were searched by volunteer searchers, as well as other underbrush, gravel roads, and farmlands. Eggleston's employer, Allnet, paid for additional air searches, which were followed with ground searches using bloodhounds. On August 6, Portland Police spokesperson Derrick Foxworth told reporters that "it certainly looks like we might have a homicide."

=== Theories ===
Eggleston's parents initially suspected her then-boyfriend, a Redmond resident, of her disappearance; however, he was cleared by law enforcement who confirmed he had been in central Oregon at the time she disappeared. Though initially suspected as a homicide, the Portland Police Bureau subsequently theorized that Eggleston had gone missing intentionally, possibly to avoid testifying in a potential court case against her sister, Janet, for tax evasion. Janet and her former husband were accused of failing to report around $190,000 in business income between 1986 and 1987. This revelation, and detectives' focusing on it as a potential motive for Eggleston to flee, led to strife between the family and investigators, specifically lead detective Terry Wagner. Paul Eggleston later stated: "Wagner made it crystal clear she was not going to talk with us, that she still believed Katie probably disappeared of her own will."

Eggleston's family subsequently hired a retired Oregon State Police detective to further investigate the disappearance case, and several leads were produced; one of the leads regarded a security guard who possessed keys to the Port of Portland Building's parking garage. To further search efforts, Allnet funded a tip hotline dedicated to tips in Eggleston's disappearance, while fliers promising a $5,000 reward were distributed along Interstate 5 between Eugene and Everett, Washington in mid-August. One anonymous call placed to the tip hotline was made by a man who claimed to have abducted Eggleston and murdered her two weeks after her disappearance. The anonymous caller, who allegedly spoke with a Southern dialect, stated that she would never be found "because I killed her."

By October 1993, police had received hundreds of tips in the case, but none proved fruitful. On October 12, law enforcement told the media that they maintained their stance that Eggleston had disappeared willingly, citing the lack of physical evidence, as well as Eggleston's missing passport, again suggesting she had fled to avoid testifying against her sister Janet. However, Janet and her ex-husband, Jeffrey Taylor, had both pleaded guilty to their charges on July 9, forgoing a trial, meaning Eggleston would not have had to testify in the first place. After her October 12 sentencing over the tax evasion charges, Janet told the media that her case was unrelated to her sister's disappearance, commenting: "To imply any connection tarnishes her in a way that is unbelievably painful to me." Eggleston's father Paul commented in letter correspondences to investigators: "Katie may be a government witness, but her contribution to the case has to be minimal. She doesn't know any more than Sarah (her younger sister, also a potential witness) about Jeff's finances."

=== Subsequent developments ===
On May 4, 2001—Eggleston's 30th birthday—her family set up a hotline seeking additional tips in her disappearance. One man who called was a former attendant at a gasoline station located at Northeast 122nd Avenue and Stark Street, who claimed to have seen Eggleston near the time she disappeared. This gas station is located approximately 4 miles (6.4 km) south of where Eggleston's vehicle was discovered. The attendant claimed to have given a woman he believed to be Eggleston directions to the airport. According to the attendant, she departed in a vehicle whose make and model he could not recall. A short time later, the woman returned to the gas station, this time in a different car—a blue-green Honda hatchback—and accompanied by two black men. According to the attendant, the woman appeared "disheveled, partially undressed and crying," and seemed to be doing things to attract attention, such as driving erratically. The attendant also noted that, when the woman had first arrived alone, he noticed a "thick, black book on the passenger seat" of her car, resembling the salesbinders used by Allnet.

Law enforcement's stance that Eggleston willingly disappeared was maintained until the 2004 disappearance and murder of Brooke Wilberger in Corvallis. Wilberger's murderer, Joel Courtney, was allegedly in Portland at the time of Eggleston's disappearance, and is considered a possible suspect. In 2006, the Federal Bureau of Investigation announced that Courtney had been cleared in two unnamed disappearances, though Eggleston's father told The Oregonian he had been informed that Courtney was still being examined as a potential suspect in her case.

Eggleston's mother, Heather, died in July 2011, followed by her father Paul, in March 2017. Both of Eggleston's parents consistently maintained that their daughter had been murdered. As of 2025, her whereabouts remain unknown.

== See also ==
- List of people who disappeared mysteriously (2000–present)

== Sources ==
- Scott, Robert (2012). The Last Time We Saw Her. New York: Pinnacle Books. ISBN 978-0-786-03001-9.
