= Disappearance of Susan Walsh =

American missing freelance journalist

Susan Walsh
- Walsh c. 1996 posed with the book Red Light: Inside the Sex Industry
- Born: Susan Merchant; February 18, 1960; Wayne, New Jersey, U.S.
- Disappeared: July 16, 1996 (aged 36); Nutley, New Jersey, U.S.
- Status: Missing for 30 years, 2 months and 1 day
- Education: William Paterson College (B.A.); New York University (M.A.; unfinished)
- Occupations: Journalist; writer; stripper
- Employer(s): Screw; The Village Voice
- Height: 5 ft 6 in (1.68 m)
- Spouse: Mark Walsh (m. 1984)
- Children: 1

Susan Walsh (née Merchant; born February 18, 1960) is an American writer and freelance journalist who disappeared outside her home in Nutley, New Jersey on July 16, 1996. Her disappearance was widely publicized into the late 1990s, especially after several newspapers and media outlets published articles suggesting possible links to the Russian mafia or New York City's underground vampire community, both subjects she had investigated while writing for The Village Voice.

Walsh's case has been profiled on multiple television programs, including Unsolved Mysteries in 1997 and Disappeared in 2012. She was also the subject of the 1998 book Piercing the Darkness: Undercover with Vampires in America Today by Katherine Ramsland.

== Background ==
Walsh was born Susan Merchant on February 18, 1960 to Floyd Shelby and Martha Ellen Merchant (née Young). Her father worked as an engineer, and her mother was a schoolteacher. She grew up in Totowa and Wayne, New Jersey. She aspired to be a poet from a young age.

Walsh graduated from Passaic Valley Regional High School in 1978, after which she attended William Paterson University, where she studied English and writing; while there, she was employed as a journalist for the university newspaper. Walsh worked intermittently as an erotic dancer and stripper to help pay her tuition. She struggled with substance abuse and alcoholism, and graduated from college with a bachelor's degree in 1984. The same year, she married Mark Walsh, a brother of musician Joe Walsh. The couple had one son, David, born in 1985.

After college, Walsh worked as a writer for engineering and business publications. She was later employed as a writer for Screw magazine, working under publisher Al Goldstein. Goldstein later described his on-and-off working relationship with Walsh as "four years of craziness."

Walsh suffered from bipolar disorder, and at the time of her disappearance had been taking medication to treat it for over a year. A recovering alcoholic, Walsh had also recently begun drinking again after eleven years of sobriety, as well as increasing her use of the anxiety medication Xanax.

At the time of her disappearance, Walsh was enrolled in a Master's program in English at New York University, which she had halfway completed, while supporting herself and her son by working as a freelance journalist and as a stripper and go-go dancer.

== Disappearance ==
On July 16, 1996, Walsh left her apartment complex in Nutley, New Jersey, which she shared with her son. Her estranged husband, Mark Walsh, lived below them. Susan had left to run errands and make a telephone call at a payphone across the street, leaving her son with Mark. This was the last time she was seen.

== Investigation ==
Although police had few clues to follow up on in their investigation, rumors circulated that Walsh's disappearance might have been connected to the investigative journalism she had been doing at the time. Police eliminated Walsh's ex-husband as a suspect following her disappearance; however, a 2006 article in New York Post revealed that he had refused to allow police to perform forensic testing of their home. In 2009 it was reported that the page for the entire month of July 1996 was missing from Susan Walsh's calendar in her apartment.

Walsh had penned an in-depth report published in The Village Voice about a strip club ring in which members of the Russian mafia in Brighton Beach were allegedly trafficking young girls into the sex industry. Following this article, Walsh had also explored an underground vampire community in New York City, but the newspaper did not run the story as it felt Walsh's writing on the matter was not objective. Ultimately, police were unable to establish any connections between Walsh's disappearance and her work on either article. Walsh established a friendship with journalist James Ridgeway during her time writing for the Voice, with Ridgeway referring to her as his "most reliable" writer.

At the time, Walsh had also participated in a documentary produced by her friend, Jill Morley, titled Stripped, which detailed women working in the sex industry. Walsh was recorded in a group interview for the film on July 14, 1996, two days before her disappearance, during which she made a reference to having a "stalker." Walsh had confided to a former boyfriend that another of her ex-boyfriends had been stalking her.

Along with participating in the documentary project, Walsh had also hired herself out to a German documentary crew making a film about Russian immigrants becoming go-go dancers, and was also in the midst of developing a documentary on the subject with the BBC shortly before her disappearance. Walsh's last work was her contributions to the book Red Light: Inside the Sex Industry by Ridgeway and Sylvia Plachy; Walsh served as the primary researcher for the book and also contributed photographs and personal writings within a month before her disappearance.

In 2022, Walsh's brother, Arthur Merchant, requested the disclosure of police records regarding her case in an Essex County court.

== Works ==
Known bibliography

- Screw Magazine
- The Village Voice (2 articles)
- Red Light: Inside the Sex Industry by James Ridgeway; Sylvia Plachy (primary researcher, contributor) ISBN 978-1-576-87000-6

Filmography

- Stripped (2001, documentary) as herself

== See also ==
- List of people who disappeared mysteriously (1990s)

== Sources ==
- Kevlin, T. A. (April 25, 2007). Headless Man in Topless Bar: Studies of 725 Cases of Strip Club Related Criminal Homicides. Dog Ear Publishing. ISBN 978-1-598-58324-3.
