= Disappearance of Leigh Occhi =

1992 American missing teenager case

Leigh Occhi
- Born: Leigh Marine Occhi; August 21, 1979; Honolulu, Hawaii, U.S.
- Disappeared: August 27, 1992 (aged 13); Tupelo, Mississippi, U.S.
- Status: Missing for 34 years, 1 month and 12 days (Declared legally dead)
- Height: 4 ft 10 in (1.47 m)
- Parents: Donald Occhi (father); Vickie Felton (mother)

Leigh Marine Occhi (August 21, 1979 – disappeared August 27, 1992) is an American who vanished under mysterious circumstances as a teenager at her home in Tupelo, Mississippi, during Hurricane Andrew. Her mother, Vickie Felton, returned home on the morning of August 27, 1992, to find Occhi missing and evidence of blood in the house.

Searches in and around Tupelo proved fruitless. On September 9, 1992, Occhi's eyeglasses were mailed to her home in an envelope, addressed to her ex-stepfather; law enforcement deemed this action a ruse in order to distract detectives in their search efforts. In November 1993, a human skull discovered in a soybean field was erroneously attributed to Occhi, but this link was later retracted and the skull was positively identified as that of an adult woman who had gone missing in an adjacent town.

Despite numerous searches, Occhi's whereabouts remain unknown. Her case has received media coverage from Nancy Grace and 20/20, as well as an extensive independently-produced podcast in 2017.

== Background ==
Leigh Marine Occhi was born August 21, 1979, in Honolulu, Hawaii, to Donald Occhi and Vickie Felton, both members of the United States Army. The couple met while serving in California, and married in 1977. The couple eventually divorced in 1981. Donald Occhi relocated to Germany, but remained in contact with his daughter, who visited him there. Occhi resided in the United States with her mother, settling in Tupelo, Mississippi.

== Disappearance ==
Locations
1 105 Honey Locust Drive in Tupelo.

On the morning of August 27, 1992, Leigh Occhi, then age 13, was left at her home at 105 Honey Locust Drive in Tupelo, when her mother departed for her job at approximately 8:00 a.m. Occhi had planned to attend an open house at her middle school that day with her grandmother. At the time, Occhi's father resided in Virginia.

Shortly after arriving at her office, Felton was notified that a storm related to Hurricane Andrew was headed for Tupelo, and phoned her house to inform her daughter some time before 9:00 a.m. When Occhi failed to answer, Felton became worried and left her job to check on her, driving approximately 1.5 miles (2.4 km) back to her home. According to Felton, upon returning home, she found the garage door open and the light on; entering the house, she noticed blood smeared on the side of the wall. "I started calling for Leigh and going through all the rooms," Felton said. "Then I went into her bedroom. Her favorite blanket was crumpled up on the floor and I was very scared." After seeing this, Felton called 9-1-1 at approximately 9:00 a.m.

== Investigation ==
=== Initial search efforts ===
Upon further inspection of the house, law enforcement found additional pools of blood in Occhi's upstairs bedroom, as well as significant portions smeared in the hallway, bathroom, and on her bedroom door. The blood found in the bathroom indicated to law enforcement that a perpetrator had attempted to clean the scene. Felton claimed that several of her daughter's articles of clothing were missing; inside a laundry hamper in the house, detectives discovered a bloodied nightgown belonging to Occhi. Tupelo Police Chief Bart Aguirre stated: "Because it looked like the blood had dripped down onto her nightgown, you would think the injury had to be above the neck possibly." The house showed no signs of forced entry.

Immediately following Occhi's disappearance, organized searches were conducted around Tupelo, mainly through wooded areas, but they proved fruitless. Occhi's father, Donald, felt that his daughter "was dead the day my ex-wife called me and told me she was missing. My theory is that some bastard beat that child to death in that house." He also stated that, while searching for his daughter in Tupelo in September 1992, he was told by several locals to "look at her mother"; however, he commented: "I already was doing that. I don’t know if her mother was involved." Additionally, rumors circulated alleging that Occhi's stepfather, Barney Yarborough—whom her mother had recently separated from—was abusive toward Occhi. Yarborough was ruled out by law enforcement, however, after providing a substantiated alibi and passing a polygraph examination.

=== Mailing of eyeglasses ===
On September 4, 1992, eight days after Occhi went missing, a worker at a McDonald's in Booneville told law enforcement that they had seen a girl resembling Occhi in a car in the restaurant drive-through; however, the child in question was determined to have been someone else. Five days later, on September 9, a package containing Occhi's glasses was mailed to the residence at Honey Locust Drive, addressed to Yarborough. The package was postmarked from Booneville. After this development, the FBI became involved in the search for Occhi, and performed DNA testing on the stamps adhered to the envelope in which the glasses were mailed. However, it was determined they had been adhered with water rather than saliva.

Aguirre stated he felt the glasses were mailed as a distraction: "There was no ransom letter or anything like that that came with those glasses. It was just those glasses. You would think if it was an actual kidnapping, you would have expected a little more to come along with that."

=== Erroneous attribution of remains ===
On November 9, 1993, it was reported in the Jackson Clarion-Ledger that a Monroe County coroner had positively confirmed via dental records that a human skull found in a soybean field was that of Occhi. Several days later, however, the identification was retracted. In this retraction, it was stated the state medical examiner would perform further forensic testing on the skull, which had been uncovered by a farmer in a ditch along the soybean field. It was subsequently determined that the skull belonged to 27-year-old Pollyanna Sue Keith, a woman who had gone missing in March 1993.

== Subsequent developments ==
"This coward must have really felt like a tough man or woman to beat a little girl to death. Often, I cannot help but think of how horrified Leigh must have been while this piece of garbage beat her to death and watched her bleed out in the hall."

— Donald Occhi on his belief regarding his daughter's disappearance

After Yarborough passed his polygraph examination, Felton was administered three separate examinations—one with local law enforcement, and two with the FBI. Independent examiners stated she showed deception on all of them. In 2017, Aguirre stated that Felton was still considered a person of interest: "You still can’t eliminate her. There are still too many unanswered questions for Vickie, and I don’t know if that is unusual for somebody to go off to work and say, well I just left Leigh but I’m going to call and check on her. Why check on her that soon after she just left her?"

Felton disputes that she had any involvement in her daughter's disappearance, and has openly stated that she believes a man named Oscar McKinley "Mike" Kearns was responsible for her daughter's kidnapping. Kearns was convicted in 1999 for kidnapping a couple and raping the woman, and, nine months after Occhi disappeared, kidnapped a ninth-grade girl he had met through a Tupelo church, raping her in Memphis, Tennessee.

For the latter crime, Kearns was sentenced to over eight years of incarceration, but served only half of his sentence, and was released in 1997 before committing the kidnapping and rape that resulted in his subsequent conviction.

In January 2025, as part of their ongoing investigation into Occhi's disappearance, the Mississippi Bureau of Investigation (MBI) Cold Case Unit, the Tupelo Police Department, and the FBI conducted a search near Occhi's former home. Regarding the search, the MBI stated, "While findings from the search cannot be disclosed at this time, investigators remain committed to following all leads and gathering information related to the case."

== Publicity ==
Occhi's disappearance has been covered by Nancy Grace and was also featured on the Geraldo Rivera Show and 20/20. In 2017, the disappearance was the subject of a six-episode podcast titled 13: The Search for Leigh Occhi. The case has also been featured on true crime podcasts Crime Junkie, The Trail Went Cold, Big Mad True Crime, and Going West.

== See also ==
- List of people who disappeared mysteriously (2000–present)
