= Disappearance of Teresa Ann Davidson-Murphy =

1999 missing person case in the United States

Teresa Ann Davidson-Murphy
- Born: May 15, 1965; Oregon, U.S.
- Disappeared: October 7–10, 1999; Rainier, Oregon, U.S.
- Status: Missing for 26 years, 4 months and 5 days
- Known for: Mysterious disappearance
- Children: 1

The disappearance of Teresa Ann Davidson-Murphy (born May 15, 1965) occurred between October 7 and 10, 1999, in Rainier, Oregon. At the time of the disappearance she was living with her second husband and her daughter. Theresa’s belongings and her vehicle were left at her home, but there was no sign of Teresa. She was not reported missing until two weeks after her disappearance. Her husband said a semiautomatic handgun was missing from the house after her disappearance.

In August 2001, nearly two years after her disappearance, authorities announced that they believed Theresa was deceased.

As of 2022, it is an active and open missing persons case being investigated by the Oregon State Police.

== See also ==
- List of people who disappeared mysteriously (2000–present)
