= Teyf =

Teyf, Teif (Hebrew: טייף), sometimes Taif, Tayf, is a surname. Notable people with the surname include:

- Leonid Teyf, Russian-Israeli businessman and accused white-collar criminal
- Moisei Teif (1904–1966), Yiddish-language Soviet Jewish poet
