= Aguilar de Campoo case =

Unsolved disappearance in 1992 in Spain

Virginia Guerrero
- Born: Virginia Guerrero Espejo; November 17, 1977; Aguilar de Campoo, Spain
- Disappeared: April 23, 1992 (aged 14); Reinosa, Spain
- Status: Missing for 34 years, 6 months and 4 days

Manuela Torres
- Born: Manuela Torres Bougeffa; March 9, 1979; Aix-en-Provence, France
- Disappeared: April 23, 1992 (aged 13); Reinosa, Spain
- Status: Missing for 34 years, 6 months and 4 days

The Aguilar de Campoo case refers to the disappearance of Virginia Guerrero Espejo and Manuela Torres Bougeffa, two teenaged girls, on April 23, 1992. Guerrero (14) and Torres (13) were last seen hitchhiking from the municipality of Reinosa, Cantabria, to their hometown of Aguilar de Campoo, Palencia. Their disappearance remains unsolved.

The case is often linked to that of the Alcàsser Girls, whose kidnapping and murder later in 1992 became the center of much media coverage, and is commonly called the Alcàsser case of Palencia.

== Last known activities ==
Manuela Torres was born in Aix-en-Provence, France, to a Parisian mother of Algerian origin, Karima Bougeffa, and José Torres, who was from Málaga of Romani descent. She and her mother had only recently moved to Spain after her parents' separation. In Spain, she became "inseparable" from Virginia Guerrero, a native of Aguilar de Campoo.

On the afternoon of April 23, 1992, Virginia Guerrero had asked her mother, Trinidad Espejo Muñoz, for money to buy a cake for a birthday party she was going to attend. Instead, the two girls apparently took a train to Reinosa (a small town located 32 kilometres (20 miles) north of Aguilar de Campoo) to go to a nightclub, without telling their families. When the party was over, it is believed that they decided to hitch-hike home because no trains were running at night. The last person known to have seen the girls was a woman from Aguilar de Campoo, who was leaving Reinosa in her car to return home when she saw the girls get into a white car on the main street in Reinosa.

== Investigation ==
Police followed leads in both Spain and France, but were unable to break the case. Torres' father resided in Marseille, but no connection could be found to his daughter's disappearance.

On 9 October 1994, two bags containing human bones were found in the countryside near the Requejada dam (a few kilometres north-west of Aguilar de Campóo), but forensic investigations ruled out the possibility of them belonging to the girls: instead, they belonged to unknown victims of the Spanish Civil War, which was waged between 1936 and 1939. Similarly, two skulls found in October 2001 were linked to the case by the media, but were determined to be from the Civil War.

In October 2017, a human jaw found in a reservoir in Cantabria was determined to be unrelated to the case.

== See also ==
- Alcasser Girls
- List of people who disappeared mysteriously (2000–present)
