= Taif Ajba =

Abkhazian poet

- Born: Taif Ajba; March 11, 1939; Achandara, Gudauta District
- Disappeared: October 9, 1992 (aged 53); Sukhumi
- Status: Missing for 33 years, 11 months and 21 days

Taif Ajba (Abkhaz: Таиф Аџьба) was an Abkhaz language poet from Abkhazia. Ajba was born on 11 March 1939 in the village of Achandara, Gudauta District. Ajba was last seen on 9 October 1992 in Sukhumi, less than two months after the entrance of the Georgian military at the start of the 1992–1993 war, as he and three others were driven off in a bus by Georgian guards into an unknown direction. According to unconfirmed reports, Ajba was tortured and shot dead.

== Works ==
Ajba's first collection of poetry, entitled simply 'Poems', was published in 1968. Besides original work, Ajba also translated into Abkhaz works by Russian poets, including Alexander Pushkin, Mikhail Lermontov, Fyodor Tyutchev and Alexander Blok.

== Legacy ==
On 19 July 2011, a plaque by sculptor Tsira Akhba was inaugurated on the exterior of Ajba's former residence in Sukhumi.

On 11 March 2016, 77 years after Ajba's birth, Abkhazia's Ministry for Culture announced the establishment of a set of three prizes in Ajba's name, for Abkhaz children's poetry, prose and drama. The first edition will cover the period since the 1992–1993 war, subsequently the prizes will be awarded every three years. Ajba was chosen over other authors who contributed to children's literature like Bagrat Shinkuba and Jota Tapagua due to his impact on the language of Abkhaz children.

== See also ==
- List of people who disappeared mysteriously (2000–present)
