= Disappearance of Michael Negrete =

1999 disappearance of an American student

Michael Negrete
- Born: Michael William Negrete; March 25, 1981; Virginia, United States
- Disappeared: December 10, 1999 (aged 18); Los Angeles, California
- Status: Missing for 26 years, 8 months and 25 days
- Height: 5 ft 8 in (173 cm)
- Relatives: Steve Negrete (brother); David Negrete (brother)

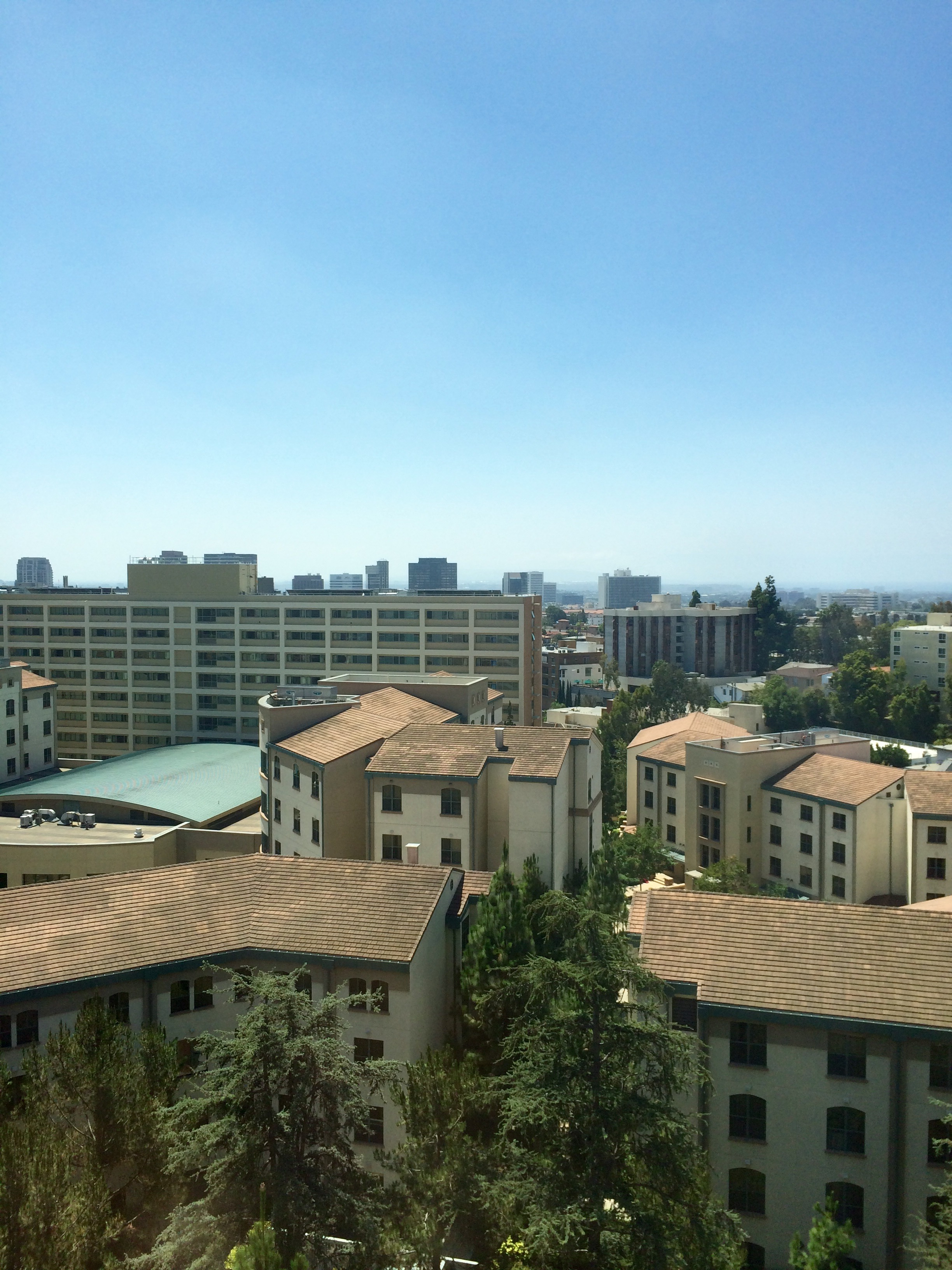
De Neve and Dykstra Hall UCLA

Michael William Negrete (born March 25, 1981) was an eighteen-year-old American man and student at the University of California, Los Angeles, who vanished without a trace in Los Angeles in December 1999. Police consider his disappearance to be suspicious and have categorized his disappearance as a homicide case.

== Disappearance ==
Locations
1 De Neve and Dykstra Hall UCLA

Negrete was a popular freshman at UCLA on a music scholarship, living at Dykstra Hall. On December 10, he had attended a party with friends on the floor he lived on, and had subsequently returned to his room. He then played an online video game with a friend in another room. At 4 AM, the game finished, and he left his room to congratulate the other player. He was last seen by the friend returning to his own room, and was never seen again. When Negrete's roommate woke up at 9 AM, Negrete was gone, but his clothing, shoes, wallet, keys and musical instruments were still there.

Although there were allegedly witnesses who might have seen someone matching Negrete's description leaving the building at 4:35 AM, this was never substantiated.

== Investigation ==
Police could not find any indication that Negrete had serious enemies, a secret life, depression, drugs or alcohol issues. They questioned Negrete's friends and other people living on his floor, but no one said they had seen Negrete since 4 AM. Although originally just a missing person case, it was soon upgraded to a homicide investigation. The only lead was one several students gave, of a man who had been spotted on the floor on the night of Negrete's disappearance, whom no one could account for. Police released a sketch of the man and appealed for him to come forward, stressing that he was not under investigation and that they were unsure if his presence had anything to do with the case. However, no one ever came forward.

Negrete did not have a car at UCLA, and LAPD bloodhounds appeared to trace his scent to a bus stop across campus. However, investigators subsequently said that the dogs were confused and the scent should not be trusted. Police searched the garbage chute and all the construction sites on campus, but found no trace of Negrete. More than 500 leads were submitted to the police, but nothing came of any of them.

There has been no activity recorded on Negrete's credit cards since his disappearance. Several psychics stated that Negrete was alive, and provided his parents with his alleged locations, but in every case this turned out to be incorrect. Negrete's parents hired two private detectives to look into the matter in greater detail, and offered a $100,000 reward for information leading to Negrete's whereabouts, which was never claimed. Island Fever, the band Negrete played trumpet for, held several fundraisers for his search.

In 2013, Negrete's brother Steve, a member of the band Steam Powered Giraffe, stated that prior to his disappearance, Negrete had recently taken drugs including ecstasy and had attended raves. In his opinion, Negrete had, while under the influence of drugs, left the building and subsequently been abducted.

== In popular culture ==
Negrete's case featured on the FOX Television program Million Dollar Mysteries.

== See also ==
- List of people who disappeared mysteriously: post-1970
