= Blackcastle Hill, East Lothian =

Iron Age hill fort in Scotland

Coordinates: 55°56′39.74″N 2°25′59.3″W

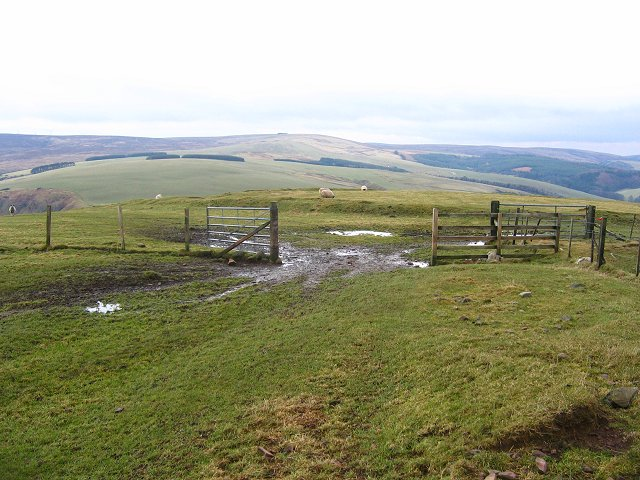
Blackcastle Hill

Blackcastle Hill is an Iron Age hill fort south of Innerwick, East Lothian, Scotland. It is near Cocklaw in the Lammermuir Hills at grid reference NT729724, at a height of 280 metres (920 ft) above sea level. The fort has a single defensive bank.

== See also ==
- Traprain Law hillfort
- Chesters Hill Fort
- White Castle, East Lothian
- Black Castle, East Lothian
- List of places in East Lothian
