= Disappearance of Jo Jo Dullard =

1995 missing person case in Ireland

Jo Jo Dullard
- Born: Josephine Dullard; 25 January 1974
- Disappeared: 9 November 1995 (aged 21); Moone, County Kildare
- Status: Missing for 30 years, 11 months and 19 days

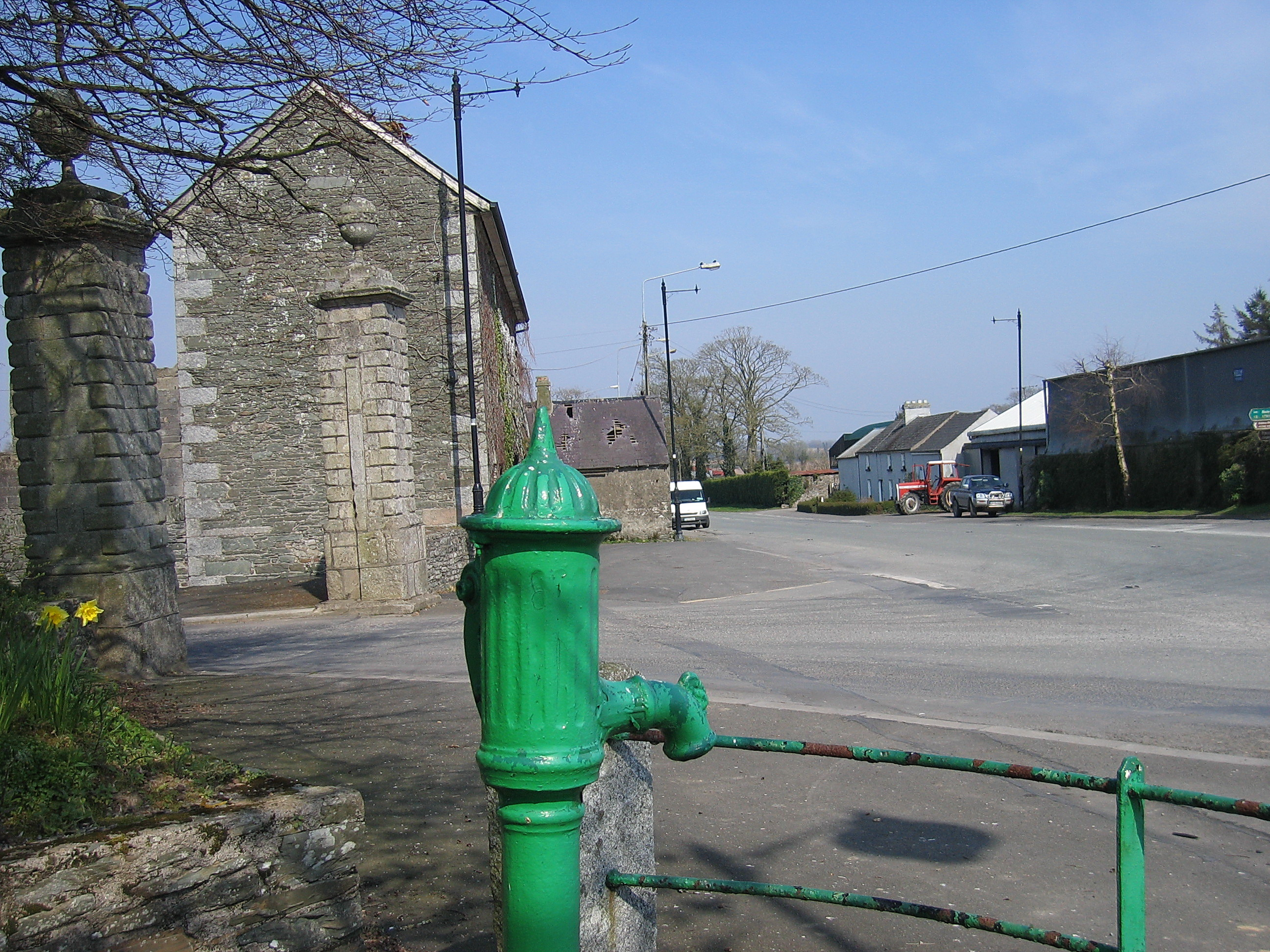
Moone

Josephine "Jo Jo" Dullard (born 25 January 1974) is an Irish woman who disappeared at the age of 21 on 9 November 1995. The last confirmed sighting of her was at a public telephone box in Moone, County Kildare. In 2020, Gardaí upgraded her disappearance to a murder investigation after cold case detectives concluded that she "met her death through violent means". Although a person of interest was arrested and questioned in November 2024, no one has ever been charged or convicted in relation to Dullard's disappearance.

== Background ==
Jo Jo Dullard was the youngest of five siblings from a family in Callan, County Kilkenny. Her father died shortly before she was born and her mother died from cancer in 1983. Dullard had recently returned to Kilkenny after working in Dublin for two years. She was due to start a new full-time job as a waitress on the Monday following her disappearance.

== Disappearance ==
Locations
1 11:37 Dullard phones from Moone phone box.
2 Castledermot where midnight sightings were reported.
3 Kilmacow where one further sighting of Dullard in a red car was reported.

On the day of her disappearance (Thursday 9 November 1995), Dullard travelled to Dublin by bus to sign-off social welfare and to collect her final social welfare payment, as she was due to begin a new job the following Monday. While in Dublin, she went to Bruxelles pub off Grafton Street to socialise with friends. Afterwards, Dullard travelled to Busáras bus station at 10 p.m. that night but she missed her bus home to Callan. She then decided to take the bus to Kildare and disembarked at Naas at 10:50 p.m. She successfully hitched a lift 20 kilometres away to Kilcullen. At Kilcullen around 11:15 p.m., Dullard hitched another lift to Moone, also a distance of about 20 kilometres, and arrived there at around 11:35 p.m. The person who dropped her off in Moone, and also the last person confirmed to have seen Dullard alive, was a son of the then Fine Gael MEP for Leinster, Alan Gillis.

While at Moone, Dullard used a public telephone box at 11:37 p.m. to call her friend Mary Cullinan to see if she could stay in Carlow and explained how she had missed her bus. During their conversation, Dullard was stepping out of the telephone box whenever cars approached in an effort to flag them down. Dullard interrupted the call for a few seconds at 11:47 p.m. and then returned to the telephone for the final time to say that she "just got a lift". Dullard then ended the call, and was never seen or heard from again.

== Missing Person Investigations ==
When Dullard failed to return home, her sister Kathleen reported her disappearance 24 hours later. Two days passed before Gardaí took the notification seriously. Gardaí then searched the River Barrow and the road from Moone to Carlow.

Sightings were reported that claimed to have seen Dullard at Castledermot around midnight on the night of her disappearance.

In 1997 a witness came forward to say that on the night of the disappearance, he witnessed two men with English accents bundle a woman matching Dullard's description into a red car with English license plates at Kilmacow. The car was described a being similar to a Ford Sierra Sapphire.

In 2020, a witness said he saw a woman running naked and screaming through Moone on the night of Dullard's disappearance. The man stated he was travelling with his boss at the time and his boss left the car to follow the woman but she ran away. The witness stated that his boss then rang the Gardaí from a telephone box and Gardaí stated they would send a car out. After Dullard was reported missing they gave a statement to Gardaí but Gardaí believed they had seen a different woman as Dullard had been sighted in Castledermot.

Jo Jo Dullard's disappearance has been included in Operation Trace, a Garda operation set up in 1998 to investigate cases included under the Vanishing Triangle moniker (a term used to describe a series of disappearances of young women in the east of Ireland during the late 1980s and 1990s) and to investigate any potential links between them.

In 2019 a priest in County Kilkenny received an anonymous letter about Jo Jo Dullard after he publicly appealed for information. The letter was handed over to Gardaí and its contents were not revealed publicly.

A memorial for Dullard was installed in Moone at the site of the telephone box where she was last seen.

== Dullard family campaign ==
During an interview with the Irish Examiner on the 10th anniversary of Dullard's disappearance in 2005, Dullard's sister Mary Phelan insisted she knew the identity of the man who had murdered her, that this individual was the Garda's main suspect and he was the same person who had picked her up from the telephone box in Moone at around 11:45 p.m. on the night she disappeared. Phelan also claimed that Gardaí had determined the man had driven from Offaly to Moone on the night in question around the same time Dullard was at the telephone box, and that although he had given three contradictory statements to Gardaí about his exact movements, there was not enough evidence for authorities to grant a search warrant for the man's farmland or car.

In a March 2017 interview with the Irish Mirror, Phelan claimed that Gardaí knew that Dullard was dead and the identity of who had killed her for over two decades, but that the man was protected from prosecution due to his strong political connections. Phelan additionally claimed that during a confidential meeting with a senior Garda in 1996 she was informed that her sister Dullard had been abducted, raped, murdered, and then wrapped in plastic sheeting before being buried 10 feet underground in a hole dug by a mechanical digger, but the Garda himself expected the investigation to reach a dead end. Phelan also made a plea for Gardaí to excavate under a roofless derelict cottage on a County Wicklow farm, which appeared to have a recently poured concrete floor, in the belief that Dullard's remains could have been buried there.

Around the same time, the Dullard's family lawyer Gavin Booth asserted that he had information that the main suspect was interviewed several times by Gardaí and was believed by Gardaí to be the person responsible for Dullard's murder. He further alleged that this suspect had a recent cut on his face around the time of her disappearance, which he did not seek medical attention for, that had since left an obvious scar. In a separate interview, Mary Phelan revealed that Dullard was training to become a beautician when she disappeared and always kept her fingernails long and painted, which raised the possibility she would have clawed her attacker's face in a desperate effort to escape. Phelan also claimed that in April 1996, the Dullard family hired a private investigator to visit the suspect's farm under the ruse of being a lost tourist looking for directions, and that the suspect had a very prominent downward pointing scar on his face that looked like a recent wound caused by a fingernail.

== Murder investigation ==
The investigation into Dullard's disappearance was upgraded to a murder investigation in 2020 following a reinvestigation by the Garda Serious Crime Review Team. Gardaí revealed that Dullard was carrying a black Sanyo portable cassette player with matching headphones on the day she disappeared, and appealed for anyone who might have received one in suspicious circumstances, perhaps as a Christmas gift in 1995, to contact investigating officers. In 2021 a search was conducted in a woodland in the Usk Little townland of County Kildare in relation to the disappearances of Jo Jo Dullard and Deirdre Jacob, though Gardaí stated that there might be evidence connected with the other missing women. Unusual activity in the area on the night of Deirdre Jacob's disappearance led to the search with the Gardaí also noting that Jo Jo Dullard was last sighted a 10-minute drive away from the search area. No evidence was found in the search.

On the morning of 11 November 2024, a 55-year-old man was arrested in Co Kildare on suspicion of the murder of Jo Jo Dullard. The suspect, who was described as coming from a "well-known family", had been a longstanding person of interest in the investigation, according to media reports. Gardaí also carried out searches of two houses in the county and a patch of open ground in Co Wicklow. A statement issued by the Garda Press Office declared that the area of land, located near Ballyhook Demesne townland outside Grangecon village on the Wicklow/Kildare border, would be subjected to excavation, technical and forensic examinations. A series of temporary no fly zones for unmanned drones were also declared over the search area by the Irish Aviation Authority. On the afternoon of 12 November 2024, the arrested man was released without charge from Garda custody, however forensic excavations continued at the search area on the Wicklow/Kildare border.

Despite local rumors that Dullard's body was either hidden under the foundations of a newly built farm building or was buried in a trench that was dug for drainage ditches, Garda detectives who worked on Operation Trace were previously able to verify that the shed in question was built quite some time before she disappeared, while the excavation and filling of earth for the drainage system had also been completed at least 12 months before Dullard was reported missing. According to media reports, the 2024 searches were focused on land where several witnesses had allegedly observed the arrested suspect digging and moving earth at times relevant to Garda investigations. On 18 November 2024, the Garda Press Office released video footage of the extensive excavations at the search area outside Grangecon village, along with a renewed appeal for witnesses to come forward if they had any information about Dullard's disappearance. On 3 December 2024, Gardaí announced that the search operation had been completed, and that the authorities would not be revealing the results of the search "for operational reasons".

On 16 February 2026, Gardaí announced that they would be excavating part of a gravel quarry located about a mile outside of Stratford-on-Slaney in relation to the disappearances of Jo Jo Dullard and Deirdre Jacob. Sources close to the investigation revealed that new information had been received that items related to both cases may be buried there. In June 2026, Gardaí announced that they were again searching the same quarry site in connection with the disappearance of Jo Jo Dullard and Deirdre Jacob. Some media outlets reported the Defence Forces had performed a ground survey of the area, while diggers and a bulldozer were pictured moving earth at the site.

== Media ==
Dullard's disappearance was highly publicised in Ireland and was included in the true crime books Missing by Barry Cummins, Missing, Presumed by Alan Bailey, and The Vanishing Triangle by Claire McGowan.

The 1997 alleged sighting of Dullard was reconstructed for the television show Crimeline. Her disappearance was covered on Crimecall, an Irish television show which seeks public assistance in solving unsolved crimes, in 2020 and 2021.

Her disappearance was also featured in the Sky Documentary series Six Silent Killings: Ireland's Vanishing Triangle.

== See also ==
- List of people who disappeared mysteriously (2000–present)
