= 2021–2022 United States House of Representatives investigation into the fossil fuels industry =

The 2021–2022 United States House of Representatives investigation into the fossil fuels industry was a year-long investigation conducted by the United States House Committee on Oversight and Reform, concluding in 2022, that examined the actions of major fossil fuels producers, collectively known as "Big Oil", with respect to representations by companies in that group regarding their efforts to move away from fossil fuels as part of an energy transition toward a sustainable future.

== Procedural history ==
In 2021, the United States House Committee on Oversight and Reform, led by Chair Carolyn Maloney (D-NY) and Subcommittee Chair Ro Khanna (D-CA), initiated a year-long investigation into the fossil fuel industry. The investigation focused on examining the actions of major oil and gas companies, particularly regarding their public statements on climate change and energy transition. The hearings were ostensibly aimed to determine whether these companies were genuinely committed to reducing carbon emissions or were engaging in misleading practices.

The investigation involved multiple hearings, document requests, and testimony from industry executives. The committee reviewed millions of pages of internal documents to assess the companies' public and private actions related to climate change.

== Witnesses ==
The investigation featured testimony from top executives of major oil and gas companies, who appeared before the committee in a virtual hearing due to COVID-19 pandemic concerns, held on October 28, 2021. Witnesses included:

- Darren Woods (CEO, ExxonMobil)
- Mike Wirth (CEO, Chevron)
- David Lawler (CEO, BP America)
- Gretchen Watkins (President, Shell Oil Company)
- Suzanne Clark (CEO, U.S. Chamber of Commerce)
- Mike Sommers (President, American Petroleum Institute)

These executives were questioned about their companies' role in climate change and their commitment to transitioning to renewable energy sources. The New York Times stated of the effort that Democrats "hoped to recapture the drama of the tobacco hearings of the 1990s, where lawmakers put the C.E.O.s of cigarette companies on the hot seat", and noted that the questioning included "shouting, shaming, and one demonstration involving a jar of M&Ms to make the point that the companies were investing relatively little in renewables", with critical comments directed at the witnesses by committee members, such as Congresswoman Alexandria Ocasio-Cortez. Conversely, Republican members of the committee were noted to have defended the role of the companies in supporting the economy.

Witnesses called by Republican members of the committee were noted to have included Neal Crabtree, "a former worker on the Keystone XL pipeline", who lost his job when that project was canceled by the executive branch.

== Conclusions and criticisms ==
The conclusions produced by that investigation asserted that while these companies publicly pledged to shift toward renewable energy, internal documents suggested that they continued to focus on long-term fossil fuel production. The investigation also noted that these companies conducted campaigns directed towards the American public about their efforts to reduce carbon emissions, and employed accounting methodologies that gave the impression of efforts to reduce such emissions.

The investigation and final report drew criticism for lacking substance and being politically charged. Politico described the hearings as largely "political theater", and in a separate piece remarked that "Unsurprisingly, the committee found that oil and gas companies, for the most part, want to continue producing oil and gas". Others noted that the investigation revealed little new information, with The Washington Post reporting that "while many of the committee's findings were already widely known — often highlighting decisions oil companies have for years made publicly to keep oil production a fundamental part of their business plans — the report details their determination to keep natural gas as a key part of the world's energy mix".

Subsequently, in 2024, Senator Chuck Grassley, the ranking Republican on the Senate Budget committee, said it was "undeniable" that fossil fuels were "critical" to U.S. energy security, and accused Democrats of failing to "acknowledge the unpopularity of their many climate policy proposals". Other critics argued that the hearings resembled prior climate lawsuits, with no credible evidence of wrongdoing. Some commentators emphasized the industry's adaptation to low-carbon energy and the importance of fossil fuels for global energy security, as acknowledged by a bipartisan selection of lawmakers.
