= Sancta Maria Abbey, Nunraw =

Abbey in East Lothian, Scotland

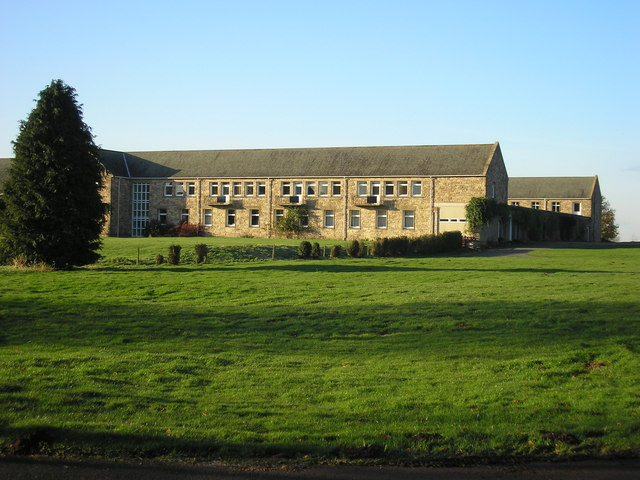
- Interactive map of Sancta Maria Abbey, Nunraw

Monastery information
- Order: Order of Cistercians of the Strict Observance
- Established: 1946
- Disestablished: extant
- Mother house: Mount St. Joseph Abbey, Roscrea
- Diocese: Archdiocese of St Andrews and Edinburgh

Site
- Coordinates: 55.9213°N 2.6519°W

Nunraw Abbey or Sancta Maria Abbey, Nunraw is a working Trappist (Ordo Cisterciensis Strictioris Observantiae) monastery. It was the first Cistercian house to be founded in Scotland since the Scottish Reformation. Founded in 1946 by monks from Mount St. Joseph Abbey, Roscrea, Ireland, and consecrated as an Abbey in 1948, it nestles at the foot of the Lammermuir Hills on the southern edge of East Lothian. The estate of the abbey is technically called White Castle after an early hill-fort on the land.

== History ==
Originally owned by the Cistercian Nuns of Haddington, the area that they settled becoming known as Nunraw (lit. 'Nun's Row'). The Nunnery of Haddington was founded by Ada de Warenne, Countess of Huntingdon and daughter of the Earl of Surrey, soon after the death of Bernard of Clairvaux, and the small evidence that is available suggests that Nunraw was a grange of that convent.

The modern monastery was built between 1952 and 1970 (but is unfinished as the abbey church was never built) by architect Peter Rice Whiston (1912-1999). The buildings are Category A listed as "a rare example of a purpose-built monastic abbey to be built in Britain in the 20th century".

== List of Abbots ==
The modern establishment has had four Lord Abbots since its inception:

- Father Michael Sherry, O.C.S.O. (d. 2003) Superior of the foundation between 1946 and its inauguration in 1948. Father Michael was the Prior, never the abbot. Nunraw was elevated from a priory to an abbey in 1948, Dom Columban Mulcahy being the first abbot.
- Dom Columban Mulcahy, O.C.S.O. (1900-1971), Lord Abbot between 1948 and 1969
- Dom Donald McGlynn, O.C.S.O., Abbot-emeritus and Lord Abbot between 1969 and 2003, an honorary "Chief" of the Igbo people in Nigeria.
- Dom Raymond Jaconelli, O.C.S.O., Lord Abbot from 2003 to 2009
- Dom Mark Caira, O.C.S.O., Lord Abbot from 2009 to 2026
- Dom Benedict Okakpu, Superior ad nutum from 2026

== See also ==
- List of monastic houses in Scotland
- Catholic Church in Scotland
- White Castle, East Lothian
- Garvald
- List of places in East Lothian
