= Black Castle, East Lothian =

Coordinates: 55°53′12.2″N 2°40′21.96″W

Designations

Scheduled monument
- Official name: Black Castle
- Type: Prehistoric domestic and defensive: fort (includes hill fort and promontory fort)
- Designated: 25 April 1923
- Reference no.: SM745

Black Castle, East Lothian is an Iron Age hillfort with a number of defensive banks, located 5 kilometres (3.1 mi) south-east of Gifford, East Lothian, Scotland. It is south of the B6355 road, between Darent House and Green Castle hillfort.

The fort is on the summit of a hillock, at 900 feet (270 m). It measures about 380 by 340 feet (120 by 100 m). It has an inner and an outer rampart, and two entrances marked by causeways. To the west is a plantation named Black Castle wood.

It is a designated scheduled monument.

== See also ==
- Blackcastle Hill, East Lothian
- Chesters Hill Fort
- White Castle, East Lothian
- Traprain Law
- List of places in East Lothian
- List of hill forts in Scotland
