= Bolton Abbey (disambiguation) =

Bolton Abbey may refer to:

- Bolton Abbey (village), North Yorkshire, England
- Bolton Abbey, estate owned by the Chatsworth Settlement, centred on the village of Bolton Abbey
- Bolton Abbey railway station, eastern terminus of the Embsay and Bolton Abbey Steam Railway
- Bolton Priory, the Priory Church of St. Mary and St. Cuthbert in the parish of Bolton Abbey
- Bolton Abbey, Moone, Ireland
