= McCarrick =

McCarrick is a surname. Notable people with the surname include:

- Annie McCarrick (born 1966; presumed murdered), American who disappeared in Ireland in 1993
- Mark McCarrick (born 1962), English former professional footballer
- Martin McCarrick (born 1962), English cellist, keyboardist and guitarist
- Theodore McCarrick (1930–2025), defrocked American prelate, former Catholic cardinal and archbishop
- Cardinal McCarrick High School, Catholic secondary school located in South Amboy, New Jersey, United States
