= Ireland's Vanishing Triangle =

1980s-1990s disappearances of women

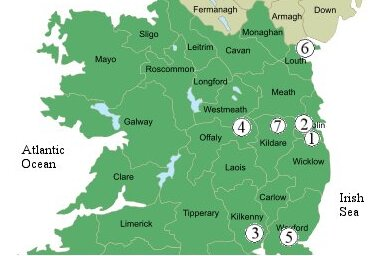
A map of Ireland showing the locations where some of the women went missing from 1993 to 1998: 1. Annie McCarrick (Glencullen, 26 March 1993); 2. Eva Brennan (Terenure, July 25, 1993); 3. JoJo Dullard (Kilkenny, 9 November 1995); 4. Fiona Pender (Tullamore, 23 August 1996); 5. Fiona Sinnott (Bridgetown, 9 February 1998); 6. Ciara Breen (Dundalk, 12 February 1998); 7. Deirdre Jacob (Newbridge, 28 July 1998)

Ireland's Vanishing Triangle refers to a number of high-profile disappearances of Irish women from the late 1980s to the late 1990s. Several other women were also murdered within the triangle and their cases remain unsolved as well. All of the cases appeared to share some common characteristics. The women's ages range from late teens to late 30s, they disappeared inexplicably and suddenly, and no substantial clues or evidence of their fate has ever been found despite large-scale searches and campaigns by the Gardaí to find them. Gardaí believe their remains are likely to be buried in remote fields, bogs and forests. The triangle is in the eastern part of the island, roughly the boundaries of Leinster, in an 80-mile area outside Dublin.

Due to similarities in the cases, a popular hypothesis is that they may be the result of a serial killer or killers being active in the area during this period. The cases of these missing women feature in the Irish media periodically and the disappearances have been the subject in a number of unsolved crime documentaries. Gardaí set up an investigation task force in September 1998 called 'Operation Trace' to focus on the unsolved disappearances and homicides, but to date this has failed to turn up any substantial clues as to the fate of the women despite a €10,000 reward offered for information resulting in the recovery of a body.

== Victims ==
=== Missing ===
- Annie Bridget McCarrick, 26, of Long Island, New York, disappeared on 26 March 1993. The last confirmed sighting of her was that morning near her home in Dublin, where she was recorded on CCTV; several later reported sightings put her in Enniskerry, County Wicklow. She arranged to see friends the next day, but was not at home when they arrived; nor did she come to work on 27 March, and she was reported missing that evening. On 24 March 2023, authorities announced that they had upgraded her missing person's case into a murder inquiry. In June 2025, Gardaí arrested a man in his 60's on suspicion of McCarrick's murder. A house in Clondalkin was also searched by officers, with the building itself and its garden being subject to both technical and forensic examinations.
- Eva Brennan, 39, of Rathgar, County Dublin, went missing on 25 July 1993. She was depressed at the time and she disappeared when she left a family lunch at her parents' house after a small argument in Terenure, Dublin. Brennan's father went to her apartment because she had not come to the family home for two days. He rang the doorbell. He then went over to the Horse and Hound Pub which the Brennan family owned and asked a barman to come over and they broke a window to get in. The jacket she had worn on the day she was last seen was there, so Brennan must have gone back to her apartment that day. There was no initial Gardaí investigation known to the family for around three months. The Brennan family have criticised the Gardaí on how they dealt with Brennan's disappearance. When last seen Brennan was wearing a pink tracksuit and leggings, a man's wristwatch with a brown strap and carried a red leatherette handbag about 8"x10" with a flap to the front.
- Imelda Keenan, 22, of Mountmellick, County Laois, was living in Waterford City, County Waterford when she disappeared on 3 January 1994. She had initially gone to stay with one of her brothers in Cobh, County Cork, but left after a short while when she went to stay with two other brothers in Waterford City. She was living with her boyfriend, Mark Wall, and they both lived in an apartment in the town on William Street. Keenan attended the Central Technical Institute in Waterford where she undertook a computer course for a short period. Keenan told Wall that she was going to the post office. Keenan left the apartment at 1:30 p.m. and walked down William Street onto Lombard Street. The last confirmed sighting of Keenan is at this time when she was seen crossing the road by a local doctor's secretary who knew her well. The secretary and a friend observed Keenan crossing the road at the corner of the Tower Hotel and Lombard Street. She was never seen again. However, in light of new evidence and witnesses, Keenan's family believe that she was murdered by someone known to her, that at least three individuals in Waterford know what happened to Ms Keenan, and criticised the original and subsequent Garda investigation into her case as foul play was not considered in her disappearance nor have the Gardaí upgraded her case to a murder investigation as requested by the family. In 2024, it was reported that a new witness had come forward, regarding a number of "frightening incidents" involving Ms Keenan. The woman was known to Imelda, but had left Waterford some time before Imelda went missing and was not aware she was missing until many years later.
- Josephine "Jo Jo" Dullard, 21, of Callan, County Kilkenny, was living in Harold's Cross, County Dublin when she went missing on 9 November 1995. She had recently dropped out of a beauty therapy course after finding it very difficult to juggle work and college. On the day she disappeared, she was planning on moving home to Callan. She had missed her bus home to Callan and had to take a bus to Naas, County Kildare instead. She disappeared in the Moone area of Kildare. She was hitchhiking home from Dublin to Kilkenny. She had been driven from the Dublin area to Kilcullen, County Kildare and then from Kilcullen to Moone. She was last seen using a payphone and through telephone records, Gardaí found out the call was made at 11:37 p.m. to Dullard's friend Mary Cullinan. She ended the call as she was about to enter another car. There was also an unconfirmed sighting of her walking along the road in Castledermot, County Kildare. The driver of the car has never been identified. In 2020, her disappearance was upgraded to a murder inquiry. On 11 November 2024 a 55-year-old man was arrested on suspicion of her murder; this man is believed to be the son of a prominent Fine Gael politician. Gardaí are searching various locations in Ballyhook, Grangecon, Co. Wicklow.
- Fiona Pender, 25, of Tullamore, County Offaly, went missing on 23 August 1996. She was last seen leaving her ground-floor apartment by her boyfriend, John Thompson, in Tullamore. Pender was seven months pregnant at the time of her disappearance. Fiona left her passport, clothing and credit cards behind. However, there were no signs of a struggle found in the apartment and it is believed that she left of her own accord and got in a vehicle. In 2008, a small wooden cross bearing the name "Fiona Pender" was found on The Slieve Bloom Way at the border between Laois and Offaly, which led to the belief that Fiona was buried in the Slieve Bloom Mountains.
- Ciara Breen, 17, of Dundalk, County Louth, went missing on 13 February 1997, on Bachelor's Walk in Dundalk. She was last seen by her mother Bernadette, who said at the time that they had both gone to bed just after midnight. That day they had gone to a local café for dinner and then returned home. According to Bernadette, she was due to get the results of a biopsy the following morning and Ciara was worried about this. The two had a short conversation on Bernadette's bed before going to sleep at around midnight. After 2 a.m., Bernadette got up to go to the bathroom and discovered Ciara was missing. She had left a window on the latch and it is believed she did so, so that she could climb back in. It is considered the most likely scenario in Ciara's case that she decided to leave her home to attend a pre-planned meeting with someone that night but this has never been verified. In 2014, two credible witnesses came forward with sightings of Ciara from the night she disappeared and in 2015, a man was arrested, but released without charge. The male suspect was arrested again in 2017 for an unrelated drink-driving charge and died of a drug overdose.
- Fiona Sinnott, 19, of Rosslare, County Wexford, was living in Broadway, County Wexford when she went missing on 8 February 1998. Fiona was last seen leaving Butler's Pub in Broadway. She left the establishment with her ex-boyfriend and father to her eleven-month-old daughter, Sean Carroll. Carroll told investigators that he had walked Sinnott back to her house in Ballyhitt, Wexford and that he had spent the night sleeping on her couch. Sinnott had gone directly to bed after complaining of pains in her arm and upper body, and the next morning, on 9 February, Carroll claimed that he entered Sinnott's bedroom and discovered that she was awake and she told him that she was planning to get a ride to her doctor later that day. Sinnott vanished without a trace. She did not visit a doctor that day, and there were no records of her having gone to any of the local surgeries. On 12 September 2008, a memorial plaque for Sinnott was stolen from a cemetery in Our Lady's Island in Wexford. The marble plaque, which had been cemented into the wall, was removed the night before it was due to be unveiled. In 2005, her case was upgraded to a murder investigation.
- Deirdre Jacob, 18, of Newbridge, County Kildare, went missing at about 3 p.m. on 28 July 1998. She was living in Twickenham, London and studying at St Mary's University but was home for the summer. She had gone to the Newbridge branch of Allied Irish Banks to get a bank draft to pay for student accommodation at the university, then went to the post office to post the bank draft. She disappeared just yards from her parents' home as she walked home. Passing motorists witnessed Jacob approaching within yards of her parents' driveway, but she never made it to her house. No trace of her has ever been found and she was never seen again. In 2018, the case was reclassified as a murder enquiry because of new information and a review of the case.

=== Murdered ===
- Antoinette “Angie” Greene Smith, 27, a mother of two young daughters, disappeared at 3 a.m. on 12 July 1987, after attending a David Bowie concert at Slane Castle in County Meath the previous evening. She had returned to Dublin by bus after the concert at about 11:30 p.m., and went to the Harp Bar on O'Connell Bridge before going on to a nightclub, La Mirage Discotheque, in Parnell Street with a female friend. While in the club they met two men that they knew. They all left shortly after 2 a.m. Antoinette's friends parted company when they left the club. Antoinette remained with the two men until all three walked to the taxi rank on O’Connell Street. The men got a taxi to the Ballymun area, while Antoinette continued to walk by the Gresham Hotel on O’Connell Street towards O’Connell Street Bridge. Her disappearance was reported by her estranged husband. Her remains were discovered on the Glendoo Mountains near the Lemass monument close to Glencree and Enniskerry, on 3 April 1988. Forensic examination of her body showed she was raped and strangled. Her head had been covered by a plastic bag.
- Patricia Moriarty Doherty, 29, a prison officer at Mountjoy Prison, had returned home in Tallaght, Dublin just before 9 p.m. on the evening of 23 December 1991; however, she soon went to the Old Bawn Centre to buy Santa hats for her children. On Christmas day, Patricia's husband reported his wife missing. The Gardaí were able to find a witness who reported seeing Patricia at 9:20 p.m. on 23 December walking past Bridget Burke's Pub towards Old Bawn Shopping Centre. A second witness came forward stating that he saw a woman matching Patricia's description entering a red car at the entrance to Old Bawn Shopping Centre. On 21 June 1992, a man was cutting turf in the Wicklow Mountains in an area known as Glassamucky Brakes, half a mileG from where Smith's body was found when he also found human remains. These were identified as Patricia's by the Gardaí through dental records. John Harbison, the then State Pathologist could not absolutely determine a cause of death due to decomposition nor could he rule out sexual assault. It was concluded that Patricia was most likely strangled.
- Marie Kilmartin, 35, of Beladd, County Laois, attended work at a local nursing home at 11 a.m. on 16 December 1993. At 4 p.m., two of Marie's female co-workers dropped her home and watched her walk to her front door. When Marie's housemate arrived home from her job at 6 p.m. she found that Marie was not at home and that none of the lights in their house had been switched on. The housemate also found Marie's groceries unpacked on their kitchen table. A forensic examination of Marie's home uncovered no evidence as to what may have led to her sudden disappearance, Gardaí did however, discover that at 4:20 p.m. on 16 December a phone call was made to Marie's landline which lasted for two minutes. The call was traced to a payphone in Portlaoise near St. Fintan's Hospital. A witness later came forward stating that she saw a lone male entering the phone box at the time the call was made. She described the man as 30 years of age, 5’6 to 5’9 in height and having dark hair. This particular individual has never been identified. On 10 June 1994, her body was discovered in Pims Lane near Mountmellick, County Laois, sixteen kilometres from Marie's home. She was in a bog beside a drainage ditch with a cement block placed on her body. A post-mortem revealed she had been strangled and there was no evidence of sexual assault.

== Theories ==
In 1998, Gardaí set up "Operation Trace", a Garda task force, to re-investigate several cold cases of women who went missing in the Leinster area in the 1990s as well as unsolved murders of women. Gardaí probed the hypothesis of a serial killer/killers operating in the area at that time. However, in at least three of the disappearances, the prime suspect was known to the woman. Larry Murphy came to the attention of Gardaí in 2000 after he abducted, raped and attempted to murder a Carlow businesswoman. The planning involved in the abduction, including a pre-dug grave, indicated that this might not have been the first time that Murphy abducted a young woman. Murphy was questioned by Gardaí over the disappearances, but he denied any involvement. He is the main suspect in the Deirdre Jacob case as well as a suspect in the Annie McCarrick and JoJo Dullard probes.

== Media ==
The cases of the missing women was the subject of a TV3 Ireland (now Virgin Media One) documentary entitled "Vanished In The Mountains". MISSING: Beyond the Vanishing Triangle is a two-part true crime documentary first aired in May 2023 on RTÉ One.

== See also ==
- List of fugitives from justice who disappeared
- The Vanishing Triangle, a 2023 television drama series about the events
