= Moone =

Village in County Kildare, Ireland

Moone Maoin
- Village
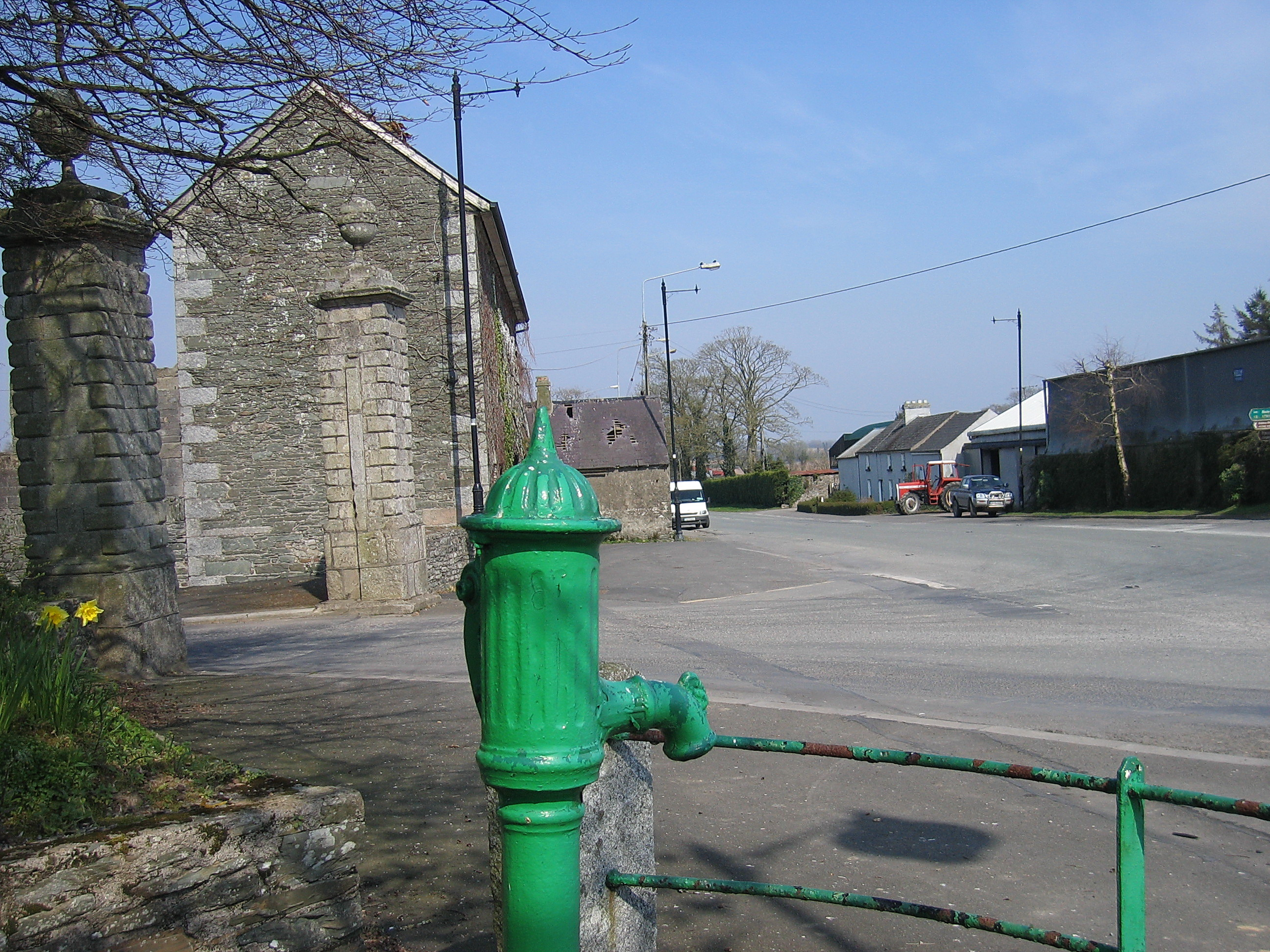
- Main Street

- Location in Ireland
- Coordinates: 52°59′N 6°49′W
- Country: Ireland
- Province: Leinster
- County: County Kildare
- Elevation: 107 m (351 ft)

Population (2016)
  - Total: 487
- Time zone: UTC±0 (WET)
  - Summer (DST): UTC+1 (IST)
- Eircode routing key: R14
- Telephone area code: 059
- Irish Grid Reference: S795931

Moone (/ˈmuːn/; Irish: Maoin or Maen Colmcille, meaning 'Colmcille's property') is a small village in the south of County Kildare, Ireland. It is 55 km (34 mi) south-west of Dublin city centre (68 km by road). It has only a few hundred inhabitants, a church, a national school, one shop and a small community centre. There is also a pub called the Moone High Cross Inn. The village is in a townland and civil parish of the same name. It is in the historical barony of Kilkea and Moone.

== Etymology ==
The name Moone comes from the Irish "Maen Colmcille", which means "Colmcille's property".

== Location, access and development ==
The closest village to Moone is Timolin, less than 1 kilometre to the north, and a number of Kildare County Council development plans have provided for joint development of Moone and Timolin.

The village is served by bus route 880, operated by Kildare Local Link. There are several buses each day, including Sunday, linking the village to Castledermot, Carlow and Naas as well as villages in the area.

Moone was on the former N9 road but has since been by-passed.

== High Cross ==
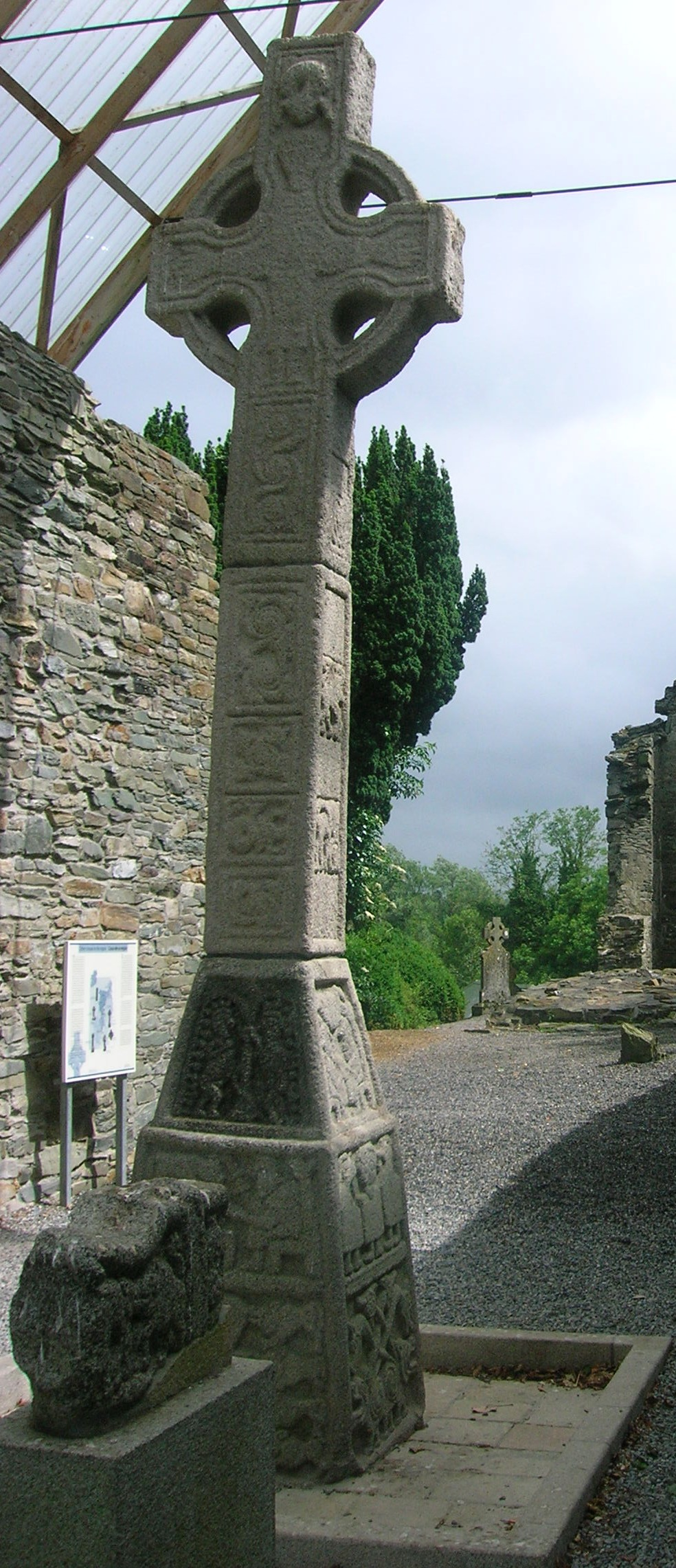
High Cross of Moone

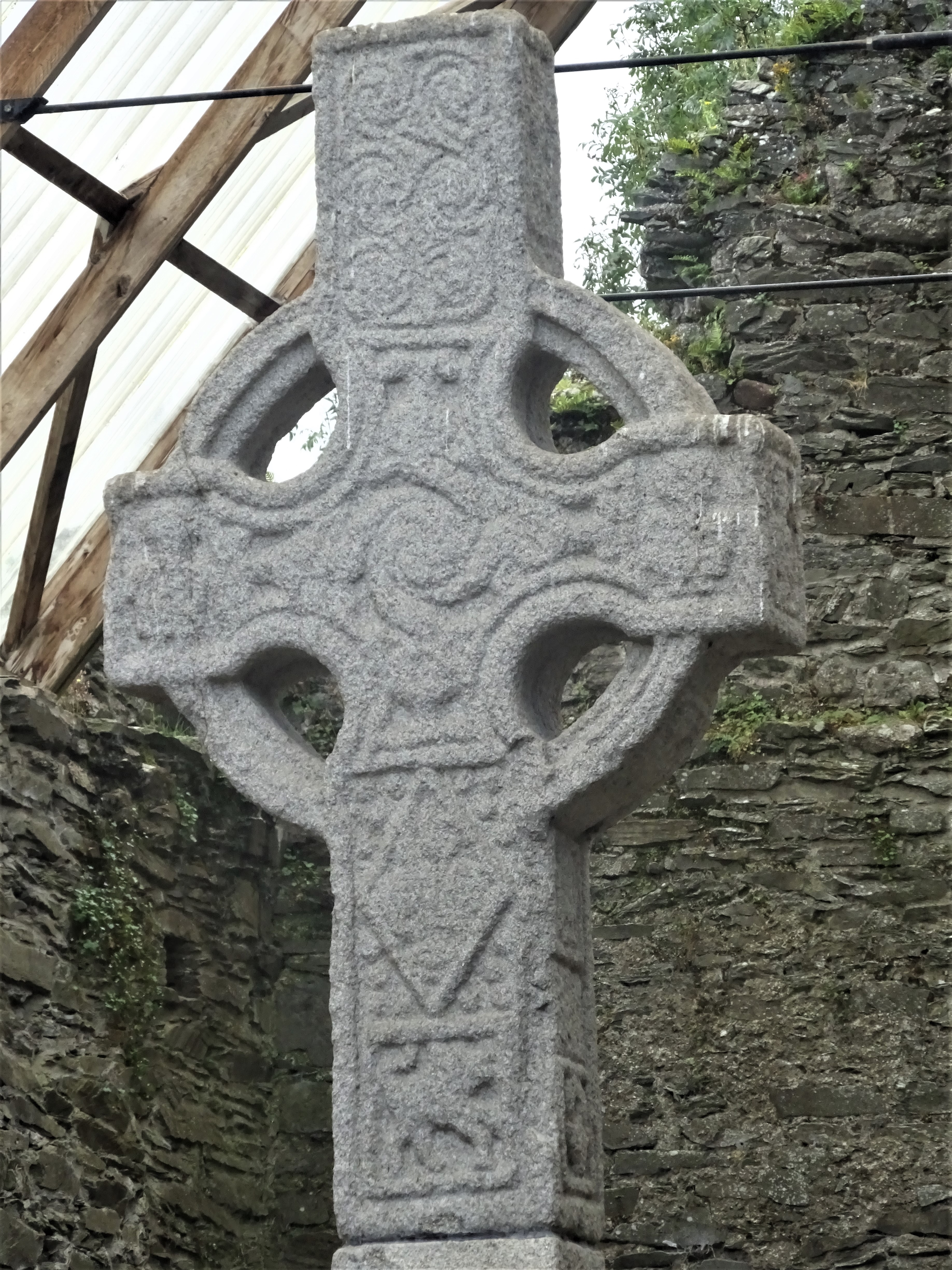
Moone High Cross, top

Moone's most notable landmark is its high cross, dating from the 8th century. It is located approximately 1 kilometre from Moone along the road to Athy (at 52°58′48″N 6°49′31″W). It stands in the remains of an old abbey, which has been associated with Saint Colmcille and whose church is believed to have been built by the Franciscans around 1300.

== Bolton Abbey - Cistercian Monastery ==
Bolton Abbey, Moone, County Kildare, was established in 1965 by monks from Mount St. Joseph Abbey, Roscrea. In 1977, it became an independent monastery, and in 2015, it celebrated its 50th anniversary.

== Sport ==
The National Hunt trainer Jessica Harrington has her stables at Moone. Her most successful horses have included Moscow Flyer, Macs Joy, Jezki, Sizing John and Alpha Centauri.

There is a local soccer club called Moone Celtic FC. The club's crest includes a high cross, and its pitch is Fortfield Park on the old N9 to Carlow.

== See also ==
- Ireland's Vanishing Triangle
- List of towns and villages in Ireland
- List of abbeys and priories in Ireland (County Kildare)
