= Disappearance of Deirdre Jacob =

Missing Irish woman (disappeared 1998)

Deirdre Jacob
- Born: 14 October 1979; Ireland
- Disappeared: 28 July 1998 (aged 18); Newbridge, County Kildare, Ireland
- Status: Missing for 28 years, 3 months and 21 days
- Parents: Michael Jacob (father); Bernadette Jacob (mother)

Locations
1 Newbridge where Jacob was last seen.

Deirdre Jacob is an Irish woman who disappeared near her home in Newbridge, County Kildare on 28 July 1998 at the age of 18. In August 2018 the Garda Síochána announced that her disappearance was being treated as a murder case.

== Family ==
Jacob was born on 14 October 1979 to her parents, Michael and Bernadette Jacob.

At the time of her disappearance, Jacob had completed her first year as a student teacher at St Mary's University, Twickenham, London.

== Disappearance ==
On 28 July 1998, Jacob walked in to Newbridge town, where she went to the AIB bank to get a bank draft to pay for student accommodation for her second year at university. She was seen on CCTV footage walking along Main Street towards the bank at 2:14 p.m. She then went to the post office on Main Street to post the bank draft, and was seen on CCTV footage queuing in the post office at 2:26 p.m. She was observed on CCTV footage at 2:32 p.m., speaking with a friend outside the post office. She was seen again on CCTV footage at 2:35 p.m., walking outside the Irish Permanent bank on Main Street. She also visited her grandmother in her grandmother's shop. She was last seen at approximately 3 p.m., crossing the road towards the entrance to her house on Barretstown Road.

At the time of her disappearance, Jacob wore a dark navy v-neck T-shirt with white trim on the collar and sleeves, navy or black straight jeans, and blue Nike runners, and was carrying a black satchel bag with a yellow Caterpillar Inc logo. The bag has never been found.

== Aftermath ==
Jacob's parents have appealed to the public for information several times over the years.

In 2016, Jacob's parents said that there was not as strong a link between their daughter's disappearance and the convicted rapist Larry Murphy as was often supposed. Gardaí were never able to place Murphy in Newbridge the day she disappeared. The only connection found was a piece of paper with Larry Murphy's name and phone number among the belongings of Deirdre's maternal grandmother after the latter's death. She had owned a shop in Newbridge, and Murphy had left his contact details with her grandmother as he was making wooden children's toys, but this was years before Deirdre's disappearance.

In July 2018, on the 20th anniversary of her disappearance, Jacob's father called for a dedicated missing-persons unit to be set up. Her parents were satisfied that the Gardaí in Kildare were doing everything possible to locate their daughter, but that a dedicated unit would help investigations into missing persons cases.

By 2018, Gardaí had conducted 3,200 lines of inquiry and taken 2,500 witness statements.

== Case upgraded to murder investigation ==
In 2018, the case was reclassified as a murder enquiry because of new information and a review of the case. Although Gardaí did not reveal the new information, they said there was a definite line of inquiry. In October 2018, Gardaí stated that they had 'significant' new leads in the murder probe and identified Larry Murphy as 'a person of interest'. A prison inmate who shared a cell with Murphy in Arbour Hill Prison told Gardaí that Murphy had confided in him that he abducted a woman in Newbridge. The prisoner had come forward many years earlier, but was interviewed again over his claims. A witness also came forward to say that on the day Jacob went missing, he observed someone in the footwell of an oncoming car either crying or laughing. Jacob’s family still live in Newbridge, and although they knew the reclassification of her disappearance as murder was to happen, they still found it "heart-wrenching and shattering to hear the hard, cold language of a murder investigation being used".

== Search on Kildare-Wicklow border ==
In October 2021, Gardaí began searching woodland near Usk Little on the Kildare/Wicklow border. The search was begun after a review of evidence and involved as many as 15 people, from the Garda Technical Bureau as well as a forensic archaeologist. The area is about three acres and the search took three weeks, but they did not find any remains; however, an ancient settlement from around 500 BC was unearthed.

On 16 February 2026, Gardaí announced that they would be excavating part of a gravel quarry located about a mile outside of Stratford-on-Slaney in relation to the disappearances of Jo Jo Dullard and Deirdre Jacob. Sources close to the investigation revealed that new information had been received that items related to both cases may be buried there. In June 2026, Gardaí announced that they were again searching the same quarry site in connection with the disappearance of Jo Jo Dullard and Deirdre Jacob. Some media outlets reported the Defence Forces had performed a ground survey of the area, while diggers and a bulldozer were pictured moving earth at the site.

== July 2022: "no prosecution" ==
The Garda Síochána submitted a criminal file to the Director of Public Prosecutions (DPP) in 2021. However, on 16 July 2022, it was reported that the DPP had returned the file with a direction of "no prosecution".

== See also ==
- List of people who disappeared mysteriously (2000–present)
- Ireland's Vanishing Triangle
