= Murder of Marilyn Rynn =

1995 murder in Ireland

Marilyn Rynn was an Irish woman who was murdered at the age of 41 after being attacked on the way home from a work Christmas party in the early hours of 22 December 1995. Her killer was the first in Ireland to be caught using DNA testing.

== Background ==
Marilyn Rynn lived in Blanchardstown and was employed in the civil service with the Department of the Environment.

== Crime ==
On the night of 21 December 1995, Marilyn Rynn attended a work Christmas party with her colleagues at Shieling Hotel in Raheny. She left the party at 2am and later met with friends for food on O'Connell Street. At around 3am she took the Nitelink bus home from Westmoreland Street.

After disembarking near her home, Rynn took a shortcut home through Tolka Valley Park where she was attacked. She had been raped and strangled.

== Investigation ==
Marilyn Rynn was reported missing on St. Stephen's Day after she failed to turn up for Christmas dinner at her parents' home. The initial investigation was hampered by inaccurate witness reports with a witness claiming to have seen her boarding a bus on Friday 22 December and from a friend who claimed to have received a phone call from Rynn on Friday.

Rynn's body was recovered on 7 January 1996, from Tolka Valley Park after a cadaver dog found her during a planned search. Semen was recovered from her body. It had been preserved by the freezing temperatures at the time.

Gardaí investigated a potential link between the murder and the disappearance of Annie McCarrick upon learning that Annie had an acquaintance who had contact with Rynn before her death.

Gardaí took over 2000 statements and 354 blood samples over the course of the investigation.

== David Lawler ==
David Lawler originally of Baltinglass, County Wicklow and living in Blanchardstown, was living nearby Rynn at the time of her death. He had also attended a Christmas party on the same night as Rynn. He is first cousins with infamous criminal Larry Murphy and attended school with him.

During house to house inquires following the discovery of Rynn's body, Lawler admitted to being in the area at the time of the crime. He subsequently gave a blood sample in February 1996. The DNA match returned in July 1996 and further tests confirmed this. He was charged with Rynn's murder in August 1996.

Following his arrest, Lawler confessed and said he was overcome by "sexual and homicidal impulses". He had been walking home behind Rynn through Tolka Valley Park when he raped and strangled her on "spontaneous impulse". Prior to his arrest he had used the internet to research DNA and falsely believed evidence of his crime could not survive the elements and consented to giving a blood sample.

He pleaded guilty at trial and was sentenced to life imprisonment though was released in January 2026, nearly 30 years after his arrest.

== Media ==
Marilyn Rynn's case was featured on Crimeline in 1996. Her murder was also covered in the true crime books The Making of a Detective by Pat Marry, a Garda who investigated the murder, and Lifers: Ireland's evil killers and how they were caught, by Barry Cummins.
