= Moone High Cross =

- Ardchros Maoin (Irish)
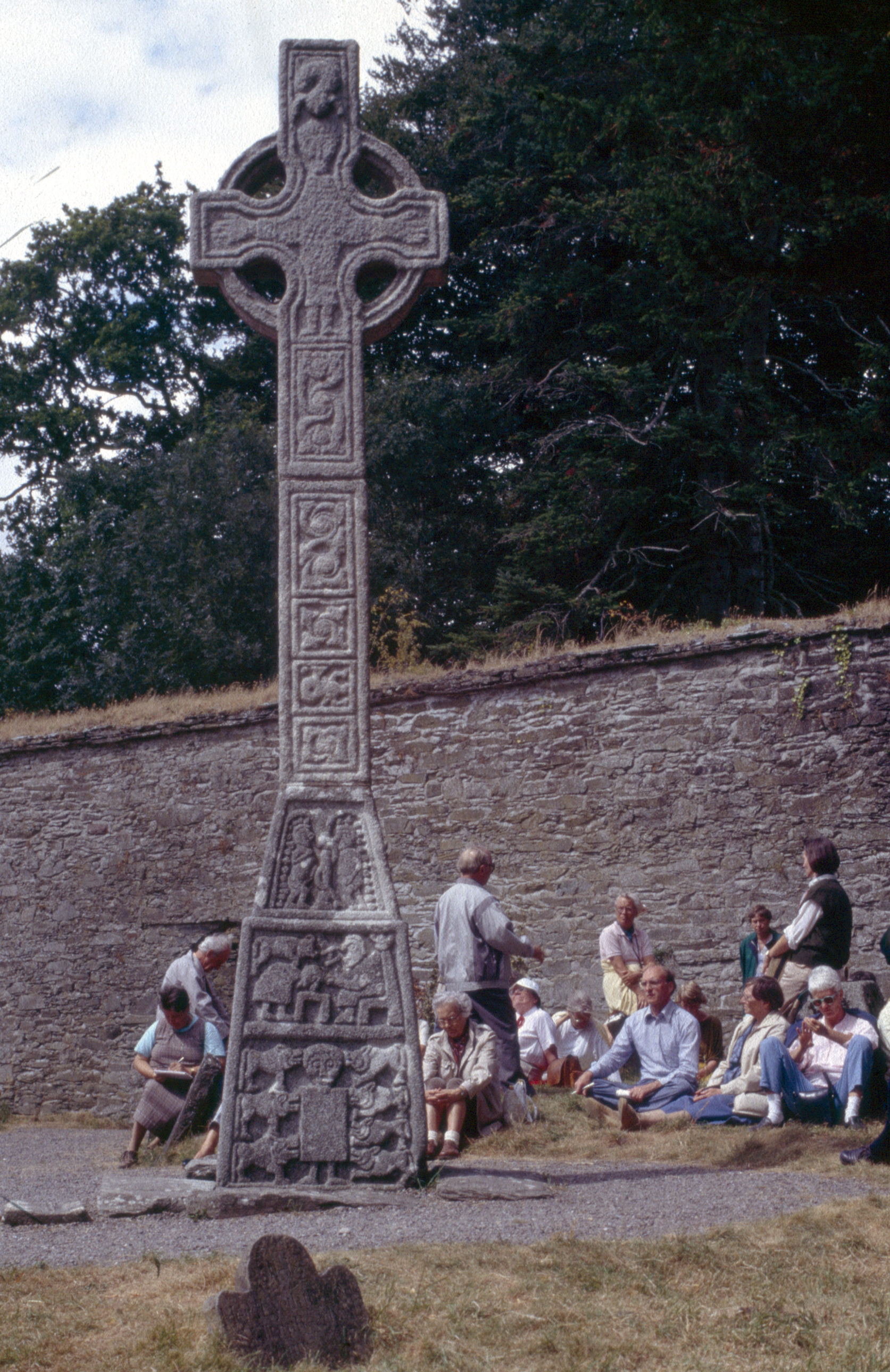
- The high cross in 1989

- Location within Ireland
- 52.9793°N 6.8252°W
- Type: High cross
- Location: Abbey of Moone (ruined), Moone, County Kildare, Ireland

History
- Built: 8th century AD

Site notes
- Height: 5.3 metres (17 ft)

National monument of Ireland
- Official name: Moone High Cross

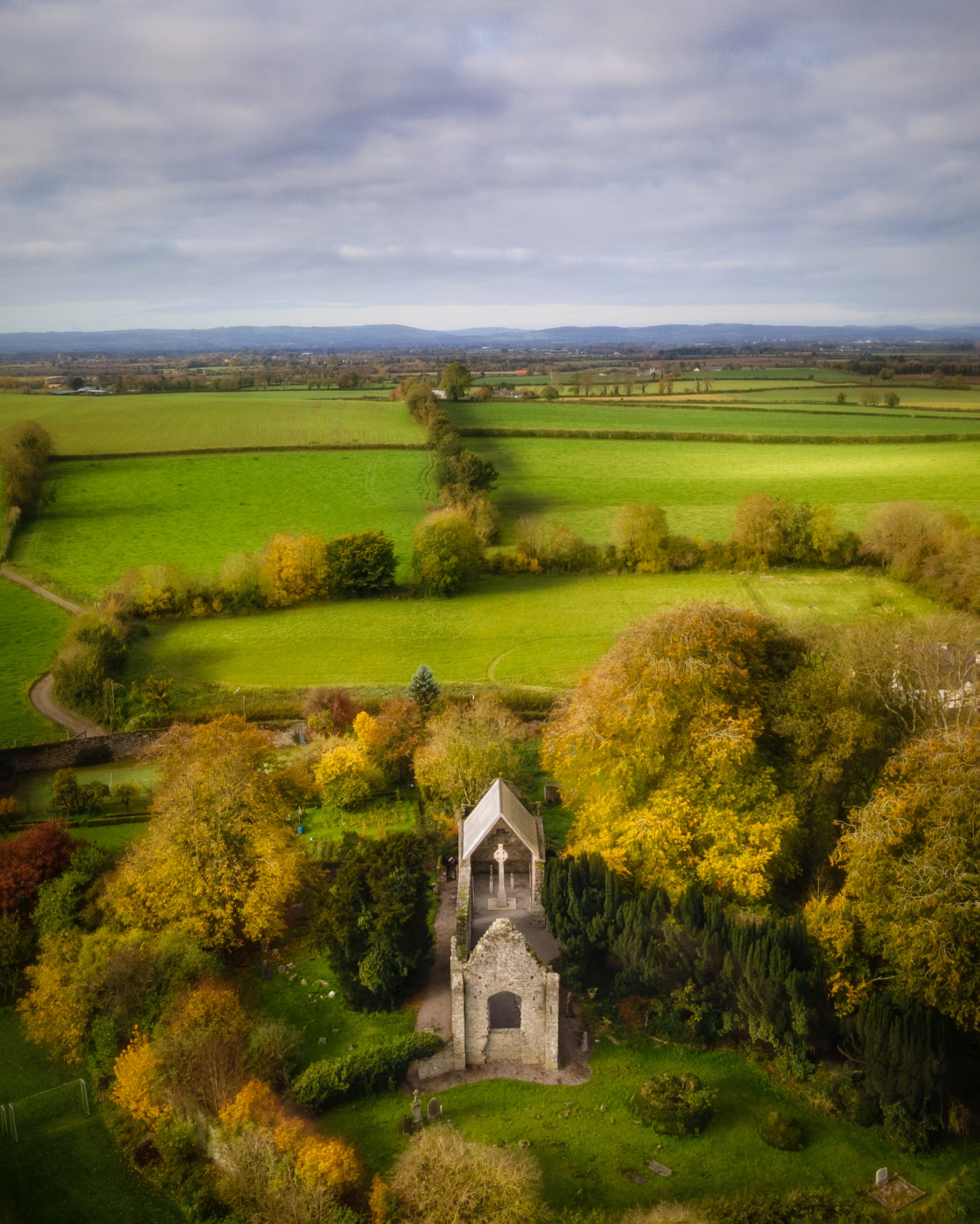
County Kildare - Moone High Cross - 20210930143632

Moone High Cross (Irish: Ardchros Maoin) is a high cross and national monument reputedly dating from the eighth century located in Moone, County Kildare, Ireland. At 17.5 feet high (including the base) it is the second tallest high cross in Ireland, and also one of the best preserved of its kind.

== History ==
Moone High Cross is located within the ruins of the early monastic site of Moone Abbey, believed to have been founded by St. Palladius in the 5th century and dedicated to St Colmcille in the 6th century. The abbey lies on the banks of the River Greese in the village of Moone, County Kildare. Fragments of other high crosses are also present within the grounds of the abbey.

The high cross lay undiscovered until 1835, when two sections of it were unearthed whilst works were being carried out in the graveyard of the ruined abbey. The then-Duke of Leinster, Charles FitzGerald, arranged for the re-erection of the cross as the sections were so well-preserved. Sixty years later, in 1893, the middle section was found and added to the cross revealing its true height.

The high cross is featured on the 'Kildare Monastic Trail', a self-guided tour designed to facilitate discovery of County Kildare's round towers, high crosses and monasteries. A roof exists over the cross to protect it from erosion.

== Description ==
The high cross is made of granite and was constructed in three sections; an upper, middle and base. The cross is heavily decorated and depicts scenes from both the Old Testament and New Testament of the Bible, including Daniel in the lions' den, the three children in the fiery furnace and the miracle of the loaves and fishes. The cross was intended as a didactic tool with which to teach the illiterate native population about Christianity. This is conclusive as the iconography of the cross pertains to that of the popular form of prayer at that time, with references to both the old and new testaments. Moone high cross is unusual, according to Stalley, in that the Christian scenes are located on the base.

The carving is famous for its flat geometrical style, in which human bodies are rendered in simple squares or rectangles. It has been suggested that this was unavoidable, given the coarse nature of the granite, but it is more likely to be the result of copying stylised models, perhaps in metalwork. The crucifixion appears on one face and, with "naïve charm", the apostles are arranged in symmetrical lines below. Christ wears the long garment, or 'colobium', rather than a simple loin cloth around the waist. Three panels are devoted to 'deliverance' scenes and another depicts a miracle of Christ, a "wonderfully simplified" version of the feeding of the five thousand, with the subject reduced to five circles (for loaves), two fishes and two non-biblical eels.

At Moone, the subjects are composed in a direct and recognisable way, compared to other high crosses (such as at Clonmacnoise) where there is far less certainty about the scenes being depicted.

== Sources ==
- Stalley, Roger (1996). Irish High Crosses. Dublin: Country House. ISBN 0-946172-56-0.
