= Disappearance of Fiona Pender =

1996 missing person case in Ireland

Fiona Pender
- Born: 13 July 1971
- Disappeared: 23 August 1996 (aged 25); Tullamore, County Offaly, Ireland
- Status: Missing for 30 years, 2 months and 27 days
- Occupations: Hairdresser; model
- Partner: John Thompson

Fiona Pender is an Irish woman who disappeared from her home in Tullamore, County Offaly on 23 August 1996 at the age of 25. She was seven months pregnant at the time of her disappearance. Gardaí suspect she was murdered. Her disappearance was upgraded to a murder investigation in 2025.

== Background ==
Fiona Pender, born 13 July 1971, was the only daughter of Sean and Josephine Pender and she had two brothers, Mark and John. Mark died in 1995. Prior to her disappearance Fiona had worked as a hairdresser and as a model. She had lived in Croydon, London for a time where she worked in a hotel before returning to Ireland.

She was living with her partner, John Thompson, in a flat in Tullamore, County Offaly at the time of her disappearance. She was seven months pregnant.

== Disappearance ==
On the day before her disappearance, Pender had spent the day with her mother where they went shopping for baby clothes. She was described as being happy and looking forward to the birth of her child. On 23 August 1996, Pender was last seen at 6 am by her partner John at their home on Church Street, Tullamore, when he left to work on his family farm. Pender's friend visited the home later that day but received no answer at the door. Pender was reported missing by her family on the following day, and five days later Gardaí issued a national alert for information on her disappearance.

== Missing person investigations ==
Several searches for Pender were conducted in late August 1996, including searches of the Grand Canal and Tullamore River. Searches for Pender included Garda sub-aqua units, Air Corps helicopters, members of the civil defence, and tracker dogs. All maternity units in Ireland and the UK were notified of Pender's disappearance as she was pregnant at the time of her disappearance. However, no trace of Pender or her baby were found.

In the early stages of the investigation, a local man contacted Gardaí to say he had seen two men carrying what looked like a rolled up carpet from Pender's apartment around the time she went missing, before they then placed the object in the back of four-wheel drive vehicle. Another witness said he was nearly forced off the road by a four-wheel drive vehicle driving at speed towards the Slieve Bloom Mountains on the night she was last seen alive.

Pender's partner, John Thompson, claimed to have stayed at his family's farm when she vanished and had no idea what happened to Pender. Thompson, along with his three sisters and their father, were arrested for questioning by Gardaí in April 1997, however they were released without charges. John Thompson was later identified as a suspect in the case. In 1999, Gardaí included Fiona Pender in Operation Trace, an inquiry into a number of high-profile disappearances of women in the 1990s.

In May 2008, a makeshift cross was found in Monicknew woods in the Slieve Bloom mountains reading "Fiona Pender. Buried here, August 22, 1996". This discovery led to searches for Pender in the area, but nothing was found. However, Gardaí do not believe the cross was placed there as a hoax. Gardaí noted that the cross stated that Pender was buried on 22 August, despite her being reported last seen on 23 August.

In 2014 it was reported that the prime suspect in Pender's disappearance was arrested in Saskatoon, Canada, for sexually assaulting and threatening to kill his wife. It was also reported that the current partner of the main suspect in Pender's disappearance was cooperating with Gardaí. The woman told police in the country she now resides in that her partner had threatened her and claimed to have killed Pender and buried her in the Slieve Bloom Mountains. She further alleged that he had taken her to a specific area of woodland when they were home on holidays and told her that Pender was buried there. This information led to further searches for Pender in a forest near Rosenallis involving forensic archaeologists and cadaver dogs, that ultimately did not recover her body. Gardaí had acted on the woman's claims as it tallied with previous information regarding a four-wheel drive vehicle relevant to the investigation traveling towards Slieve Bloom around the time Pender disappeared.

== Murder investigation ==
The inquiry into Pender's disappearance was upgraded to a murder investigation in early 2025 after Gardaí began searches in an area of farmland close to Killeigh village on 26 May 2025. A 7-day temporary no fly zone for unmanned drones was also declared over the search area near Graigue townland by the Irish Aviation Authority on the same day. On 28 May 2025, Gardaí began searching land to the south of Clonaslee in relation to Pender's disappearance, which was near to an area previously searched in 2008. IAA also declared a temporary no fly zone for unmanned drones over the new search area. Both investigations ended by 30 May 2025, without the recovery of any human remains. A source close to the inquiry claimed that the new searches were prompted after a witness, who personally knew both Pender and the prime suspect in her murder, had come forward to Gardaí with new "credible information" regarding the circumstances of her disappearance.

Reports in the Irish media suggested that the case was upgraded to a murder inquiry and the most recent searches were launched after new "highly significant" information was received by Gardaí. It was also reported that investigating officers still believed their original prime suspect, who was detained for questioning in 1997, was responsible for Pender's disappearance. However, he had been living abroad in self-imposed exile for over ten years and authorities could not seek his extradition to Ireland without firm evidence of his involvement in her death.

== Aftermath ==
Fiona Pender's disappearance was highly publicized in Ireland and often included in connection with disappearances collectively known as Ireland's Vanishing Triangle.

In 2014, a memorial and walking trail were created to commemorate Fiona Pender in Offaly. Fiona's Way is a 4.5 km walk along the canal in Tullamore. In 2022, Ashling Murphy was murdered while jogging on Fiona's Way.

In 2016, Fiona's mother Josephine revealed that Fiona's father Sean had died by suicide as he struggled to cope with the loss of Fiona, her baby, and his son Mark who had died a year before Fiona's disappearance.

=== Media ===
Fiona Pender's disappearance was highly publicised and covered in the true crime books Missing by Barry Cummins, Missing, Presumed by Alan Bailey, and The Vanishing Triangle by Claire McGowan.

Her disappearance was also covered on multiple occasions on Crimecall, an Irish television show which seeks public assistance in solving unsolved crimes. It was also featured in the documentary television series Six Silent Killings: Ireland's Vanishing Triangle.

== See also ==
- List of people who disappeared mysteriously (2000–present)
