= Nunraw =

Hillfort in East Lothian, Scotland

Nunraw is an estate in East Lothian, Scotland. It includes the Whitecastle, a hillfort, situated on the edge of the Lammermuir Hills, two miles south of the village of Garvald, (55.909°N 2.6206°W, grid reference NT613686, OS Landranger No.67). Nunraw House was formerly used as the Guesthouse for retreatants at Sancta Maria Abbey the Cistercian monastery on the hillside nearby. Sir James Balfour Paul, Lord Lyon King of Arms, writing in 1905 stated that Whitecastle and Nunraw are the same place and that the lairds there were often referred to by one or the other of these territorial designations.

== Whitecastle ==
It is likely that the Whitecastle was first settled by the ancestors of the Votadini tribe, whose main eastern capital was Dunpender, due north. The fort is ideally placed to strategically control the northern end of one of the main passes through the Lammermuirs, along the Whiteadder Water. With the further fortifications three miles further east at Blackcastle and Greencastle it would have been ideally placed for a beacon to alert the tribe in case of an invasion from the south.

The hillfort was excavated over four years between 2010 and 2013 by Murray Cook and David Connolly of Rampart Scotland http://www.rampartscotland.co.uk/, and dates to the second half of the 1st millennium BC, though there was also evidence of limited Neolithic and Early Bronze Age activity.

== Nunraw ==
It is thought that the first 'modern' feudal superior of the lands of Nunraw was the Church. The name Nunraw denotes the nuns' row or hamlet, and Martine adds that "old nuns came from Italy and settled down at Nunraw". The Lauder of The Bass family appear to have later held it as a feu. In July 1501, Jonet, prioress of the Convent of Haddington, (represented by David Balfour of Caraldstone) disputed with Robert Lauder of The Bass ownership of the lands and chapellany of Garvald, and damage made to Robert Lauder's house at Whitecastle. The case was remitted to Patrick Hepburn, 1st Earl of Bothwell, for his consideration and adjourned until 15 October 1501.

The conflict seemed to continue, however, as the Justiciary Records, under date 25 February 1510, narrate how "Thomas Dicsoune (Dickson) at the Monastery of Hethingtoune (Haddington) and others, came in the King's will for oppression done to Robert Lauder of The Bass, knight, coming under silence of night to the lands of Whitecastle, and casting down the house built there by the said Robert" (presumably the Pele Tower there). His father having died in the interval, the son Sir Robert Lauder of The Bass (d.1517) was present in person at his hearing. The offender was fined 15 merks.

In July 1547, during the war of the Rough Wooing, Elizabeth, prioress of Haddington was made keeper of the 'place and fortalice of Nunraw.' She undertook to keep it 'surlie fra our auld ynemies of Ingland and all uthairis.' She agreed only to render the house to Regent Arran or if necessary, demolish it and make it uninhabitable.

By the middle of the sixteenth-century, Patrick Hepburn of Beanston was in possession of this estate and Tower. In The Great Seal of Scotland a charter (number 1753) confirmed at Craigmillar Castle on 3 December 1566 by Mary, Queen of Scots (but originally written and signed at the Monastery at Haddington on 6 August 1556) mentions that following his father's death, Patrick Hepburn and his affairs were placed in the hands of his tutorix, Lady Elizabeth Hepburn, Prioress of the Monastery at Haddington. In this charter, Patrick is referred to as "of Whitecastle" but he is clearly mentioned as the son of his father John Hepburn of Beanston; and he is granted the lands of Slaid, [today spelt Sled] near Garvald, in Haddingtonshire. Attached to this is a further charter, a regrant of the same properties, which mentions that Patrick has now married Margaret, daughter of James Cockburn, of Langton in Berwickshire. It also states that Patrick has a younger brother James and that they have an elder brother William.

Patrick Hepburn of Whitecastle (d. November 1583) was one of the 'Ruthven Raiders' and signed the 'secret band' of 26 August 1582 at Perth after James VI was detained at Ruthven Castle. His last testament gives his designation as "Hepburn of Whitecastle, knight, Laird of Benestoun"

The Hepburns were still in possession in the 18th century. On 23 December 1735, the Garvald Kirk Session elected Francis Hepburn of Nunraw as an Elder, and as Deacon, for the united parishes of Garvald & Bara. He was dead by 15 January 1747, when a Sasine registered on that date referred to "Christian Anderson, relict of Francis Hepburn of Nunraw". Of their known children, two are sons, Patrick and Francis.

== Nunraw House ==
According to Colin McWilliam, the baronial-style mansion at Nunraw, built in 1860 in a castellated deep red sandstone, "incorporates the Hepburns' 16th-century tower house". The tower may from an earlier period. John Martine stated that the fortalice was originally connected with the monastery at Haddington. The old part of the building consisted of a long block running east to west, with two square towers to the north-east and south-west, and round stair-turrets in the two north-west angles. Only the north-east tower is externally unaltered. There also remain vaulted cellars to the two turnpike staircases. Robert Hay carried out alterations and additions between 1860 and 1864 which were decidedly antiquarian in intent, and with a zeal for a kind of authenticity. During the alterations in 1864 to the first floor room at the east end of the main block, a tempera-painted board-and-joist ceiling was discovered. It bears the joint monogram of Patrick Hepburn and Helen Cockburn (see above). After 1880, Walter Wingate Gray installed much oak panelling, and also made the painted room into a chapel. Mr. Wingate Gray was still in possession of the estate in 1890, and is buried with his wife Mary Stephenson J.P. in the grounds.

=== Present day, Sancta Maria Abbey ===
In 1946, the building was acquired by the Cistercian brothers of Mount St. Joseph Abbey, Roscrea in County Tipperary in Ireland, their intention being to found a daughter-house. By 1948, the community of Nunraw had been allowed the dignity of calling itself an Abbey. The first abbot, Dom Columban Mulcahy, was elected and invested as the first Cistercian Abbot in Scotland since the Reformation. In 1962, the community commenced building a new Abbey and church to the south west of Nunraw House, moving into the partially completed building in 1969. Nunraw House itself was sold by the abbey and is once again a private residence.
