= Bolton Abbey, Moone =

Cistercian (Trappist) abbey in County Tipperary, Ireland

Coordinates: 52.95611735°N 6.82279656°W

Bolton Abbey, Moone, County Kildare is a Cistercian monastery, founded in 1965. It was established by monks from Mount St. Joseph Abbey, Roscrea, and became an independent monastery and abbey in 1977. The monastery works a dairy farm on its property.

The farm and house were donated by Dr. Robert Farnan. The monastery was established by Fr Ambrose Farrington and Br Kieran Dooley from Roscrea and officially opened in 1965. In 2015 it celebrated its 50th anniversary.

== Superiors / Abbots ==
- 1965 - Dom Ambrose Farrington - Superior
- 1974 - Dom Bennedict Kearns - Superior
- 1977 - Abbot Benedict Kearns
- 1994 - Abbot Ambrose Farrington
- 2000 - Abbot Eoin De Bhalraithe (abbot 20/05/2000–20/05/2006)
- 2006 - Abbot Peter Garvey (1937–2014)
- 2012 - Abbot (Dom) Michael Ryan (abbot 2012–)
