= Larry Murphy (criminal) =

Irish rapist and suspected serial killer

- Born: 7 February 1965 (age 61); Baltinglass, County Wicklow, Ireland
- Convictions: Rape, attempted murder
- Penalty: 15 years, served 10

Details
- Victims: 1 confirmed, 8+ suspected

Larry Murphy is an Irish convicted criminal. After his conviction for kidnapping, repeated rape, and attempted murder of a young Carlow woman on 11 February 2000, in the Wicklow Mountains, he was jailed in January 2001. His release from prison less than 10 years later drew widespread criticism.

During the ordeal, which lasted for a number of hours, Murphy kidnapped the woman and locked her in the boot of his Fiat Punto car. He then drove to Kilkea in County Kildare, where he repeatedly raped and beat her. She was then locked in the boot again while he drove to Spinans Cross in the Wicklow Mountains where he again raped her several times vaginally, anally and orally. The woman began to fight back and Murphy produced a plastic bag, which he placed over her head in an attempt to suffocate her. He stopped his assault when two hunters came across the scene and recognised Murphy. Murphy fled the area and returned to his home. The hunters then escorted the terrified woman to the police station in Baltinglass, where they identified Murphy as her attacker.

Murphy was arrested the next morning when members of the Garda Síochána (the Irish police force) came to his home. He knew why they were there and admitted what he had done the previous day, commenting to his wife as he left with gardaí, "I raped a girl last night". It was reported that during questioning about the woman's injuries, Murphy commented "Well, she's alive isn't she?" and "She was lucky", and showed no sign of remorse or guilt.

Murphy pleaded guilty to four charges of rape, one charge of false detention, one charge of attempted murder, one charge of assault causing harm, and one charge of robbery. In May 2001, he was sentenced by the Central Criminal Court to 15 years' imprisonment on each of the rape, false detention and attempted murder charges. He was sentenced to four years' imprisonment for the assault charge and three years' imprisonment on the robbery charge. The eight sentences were all to run concurrently, and the final year of each sentence was suspended on the basis of his early guilty plea.

Murphy was released on 12 August 2010 after serving only ten years. His release caused a public outcry, particularly as he had refused treatment while in prison and never demonstrated any remorse. Murphy's suspected involvement in some of Ireland's most famous missing persons cases also contributed to the controversy. His cousin is David Lawler, a convicted rapist and murderer who was the first person convicted using DNA testing in Ireland.

Murphy was sentenced before the Sex Offenders Act, 2001 came into force, so he is not subject to a post-release supervision order.

== Release from prison ==
There was widespread opposition upon Murphy's early release, and the residents of his home town, Baltinglass, announced that he would not be welcome in the village. After he was released he was considered a high risk offender and was visited by a member of the Gardaí every month.

It was known that Murphy had left the country and taken up residence in the south of Spain, where he was under surveillance by police. Shortly afterwards he moved to Amsterdam. During his time there, witnesses, hitherto unaware of his past, reported that he frequented several bars but was quiet and kept to himself. He drank and smoked cannabis regularly and at times approached and attempted to strike up conversation with young women. In time the media became aware of his location and under increased scrutiny from Dutch police, Murphy moved back to Spain.

Living in the south of Spain, in late May 2011, Murphy's wallet and passport were allegedly stolen while engaging the services of a prostitute. This led him to consult the Spanish authorities in a bid to travel back to Ireland to obtain a new passport. As a result of his background becoming known, there was much dissension among the local population regarding his presence there. Two weeks later, after his new documents were in order, he returned to southern Spain.

In November 2012 he was photographed by journalists in Amsterdam, where he was found living with a friend, a convicted double rapist. This was aired on a 60-minute exclusive episode of TV3's prime-time Midweek TV program.

In January 2013, there were some local rumours (quickly spread on social media) that he had been seen in Saggart, County Dublin, but this was quickly denied by crime journalist Paul Williams, who stated that he was then living in Amsterdam.

In June 2014, it was reported that he was living in South London under an alias, working as a carpenter.

== Alleged sightings ==
In the period after Murphy's release, there developed speculation surrounding the whereabouts of Murphy. This was usually, in part, driven by rumours initiated via social networking sites that Larry Murphy was living in or visiting a particular town or locality. There exist a number of dedicated social networking web pages that regularly post information on alleged sightings. Such sites have come under criticism as many of the claims therein are frequently of an inflammatory and alarmist nature, posted specifically to create and fuel mass hysteria and fear among the communities where Murphy has been alleged to reside. The alleged sightings often occur in rural villages and towns and have sometimes resulted in mild panic, in one case resulting in an arson attack on the premises where Murphy was alleged to have been staying. In other cases, the alleged sightings have been a result of individuals who bear a resemblance to Larry Murphy being mistakenly identified as him. Such an incident happened where he was alleged to have been resident at a popular country lodge hotel in the Glen of Aherlow, County Tipperary. Such alleged sightings frequently appear in the media and when they do so appear, the Gardaí often release statements to the contrary and reassure the public that the authorities are fully aware of the man's true whereabouts. Despite such efforts to allay fears, such allegations continue to regularly appear.

== Media interviews ==
While Murphy was said by his brother Thomas to be a quiet individual who felt uneasy about being in the limelight, Murphy has been the subject of a number of interviews from the media.

=== TV3 Midweek ===
On 28 November 2012, a 60-minute exclusive episode of TV3's prime-time Midweek program focusing on Larry Murphy aired. The show featured a rare interview in which Murphy was questioned by reporter Paul Williams regarding his conviction, his time in prison and his alleged links to the other cases of missing women. Murphy again denied any suggestion of his involvement and said that if the Gardaí had any evidence yet to connect him with the cases, he would already have been charged.

== See also ==
- Ireland's Vanishing Triangle
