= Disappearance of Annie McCarrick =

1993 missing person case in Ireland

Annie McCarrick
- Born: Annie Bridget McCarrick; March 21, 1966; Long Island, New York, United States
- Disappeared: March 26, 1993 (aged 27); Dublin, Ireland
- Status: Missing for 33 years, 4 months and 17 days
- Height: 5 ft 8 in (1.73 m)
- Parents: John McCarrick (father); Nancy McCarrick (mother)

Annie Bridget McCarrick (born March 21, 1966) is an American woman from Long Island, New York, who went missing under suspicious circumstances on March 26, 1993, while she was residing in Ireland.

== Background ==
McCarrick was born on Long Island and she lived there until her move to Ireland in January 1987. She was the only child of her parents John and Nancy.

McCarrick visited Ireland on a school trip as a teenager and fell in love with the country. She studied at St Patrick's College, Drumcondra and St Patrick's College, Maynooth in the late 1980s, then returned to New York and began studying at Stony Brook University in 1991.

McCarrick moved to Ireland permanently on 4 January 1993, living in rented accommodation at St Cathryn's Court apartment complex in Sandymount with two other tenants.

=== Days before disappearance ===
She attended the Saint Patrick's Day parade with friends.

On 25 March, she dropped in to Café Java on Leeson Street to collect her wages, but as the wages were not ready, she arranged to return the following day. McCarrick worked at Café Java as a waitress and also at the Courtyard Restaurant, Donnybrook She later visited friends and stayed for dinner.

On Friday, 26 March, she spoke to her flatmates, who were going to go home for the weekend. She visited the AIB branch in Sandymount shortly before 11 am – this is the last confirmed sighting of her.

Her mother was due to visit her on 30 March and Annie was looking forward to seeing her.

== Disappearance ==
Locations
1 Last known location, Ranelagh.

McCarrick disappeared on Friday, March 26, 1993. She had left her apartment in Dublin so that she could go to the Wicklow Mountains for the day. She had asked a friend to accompany her, but her friend declined. CCTV captured images of McCarrick in the Allied Irish Bank location in Sandymount, where she was seen withdrawing money from her bank account. She did some shopping at Quinnsworth supermarket before returning to her apartment at 3:00 pm. She was seen on a bus at about 3:40 pm in Ranelagh heading toward Enniskerry.

=== Glencullen ===
Some time later that evening between 8 pm and 10 pm, the doorman at Johnnie Fox's pub in Glencullen claims to have seen McCarrick at the pub accompanied by a young man who was wearing a wax jacket. Allegedly, McCarrick had gone to see an Irish music and dancing show, a traditional event called the Hooley Show, but did not realise that there was a cover charge. McCarrick's male friend then paid for her, accompanying her to watch the show. Nobody saw either McCarrick or her male friend leave the pub, and the man's identity has never been discovered. However, it is believed that this was a false sighting and that McCarrick might have gone missing sometime after arriving in Enniskerry. As it was dark and wet outside that night, it seems unlikely that McCarrick would have walked all the way from Enniskerry to Glencullen, which was 6 km (4 miles) away.

== Missing person investigation ==
Numerous searches by authorities in Ireland have turned up nothing in McCarrick's disappearance. The authorities focused their search on the Wicklow Mountains and wider Leinster area as many women have gone missing there (the "Vanishing Triangle") since 1990. Gardaí believe that McCarrick may have been murdered by the same serial killer involved in the other disappearances.

=== 2008: Reopening ===
In 2008 the case was reopened.

=== 2014: Ex-garda book ===
In 2014, in a new book called Missing, Presumed by a detective named Sergeant Alan Bailey, it was revealed that an IRA killer and child abuser was established as a "credible suspect" in the disappearance of McCarrick.

=== 2020: Reported sighting in Enniskerry ===
In March 2020, it came to light that a woman named Margaret Wogan spotted a woman matching the description of Annie McCarrick, in Poppies cafe in Enniskerry on the Friday afternoon that she went missing. According to Wogan, McCarrick was accompanied by a man with a "square face". Private investigators now believe that this is a vital piece of information in the McCarrick case.

=== 2020: US-based investigators ===
In July 2020, a New York-based lawyer named Michael Griffith announced that he had received a significant new lead in relation to the Annie McCarrick case. In September 2020, a U.S.-based team of private investigators announced that they had identified the suspect whom they believe murdered Annie McCarrick. The investigative team believes that McCarrick never actually made it to Johnnie Fox's pub and that the alleged sighting at the pub was a case of mistaken identity. Instead, the team believes that McCarrick went missing some time after arriving in Enniskerry. Michael Griffith stated that the pieces of the puzzle were slowly coming together. Michael Griffith stated that the new lead they are working on involves someone whom McCarrick may have dated.

=== 2023: Anglés allegation ===
In February 2023, Spanish television channel La Sexta aired a three-part documentary "Anglés: Historia de una fuga" claiming that the notorious criminal Antonio Anglés might have been responsible for her disappearance.

== Murder inquiry ==
On 24 March 2023, two days before the 30th anniversary of McCarrick's disappearance, Gardaí stated they had upgraded the investigation to a murder inquiry. They also announced that they had identified two men of interest in regard to McCarrick's disappearance and that these two individuals had lived near her in Sandymount. In April 2025, it was revealed that Gardaí had interviewed one of two brothers, who were both friends of McCarrick's around the time she disappeared, at a hospital in France where he was receiving treatment for a long-term illness. The two brothers were reported to have first been interviewed by Gardaí in 1993, but both had alibis about being away from Dublin on the weekend McCarrick vanished. They were also allegedly interviewed again several years later as "persons of interest" by Gardaí working on Operation Trace.

=== 2025: Suspect arrested ===
On the morning of 12 June 2025, Gardaí arrested a 62-year-old man at his home in County Meath on suspicion of McCarrick's murder and thereafter released him without charge after 24 hours of interrogation. A house in the Monastery Walk area of Clondalkin was also searched by officers, with the building itself and its garden being subject to both technical and forensic examinations. A digger, consaw, power tools, and a skip have been brought to examine the property. Sources close to the investigation revealed that the arrested man was well known to McCarrick since the late 1980s, and that his parents previously lived at the property being searched in Clondalkin. According to media reports, the arrested man had been the prime suspect in McCarrick's murder for a considerable number of years, and Gardaí theorized that he had killed her as the result of a personal dispute. It was also reported that Garda detectives had traveled abroad to take statements from a close confidant of the suspect in recent months, that this man had previously told Gardaí that he was with the prime suspect during the weekend McCarrick vanished, and that the prime suspect was arrested as the result of Irish authorities receiving new information regarding her disappearance. It had also been established that McCarrick had confided in friends that she had been having trouble with a man, who had previously struck her.

== Media ==
The case was the subject of an episode of the TV3 (now Virgin Media One) crime series Crime in Mind.

The case was discussed in episode 4 of the 2015 investigative series Donal MacIntyre: Unsolved entitled "The Case of Annie McCarrick".

McCarrick's disappearance is covered in MISSING: Beyond the Vanishing Triangle, a two-part true crime documentary first aired in May 2023 on RTÉ One.

The case is also at the centre of the documentary Six Silent Killings: Ireland's Vanishing Triangle, which first aired on 12 November 2023 in the UK.

== See also ==
- List of people who disappeared mysteriously (2000–present)
