= Mount St. Joseph Abbey, Roscrea =

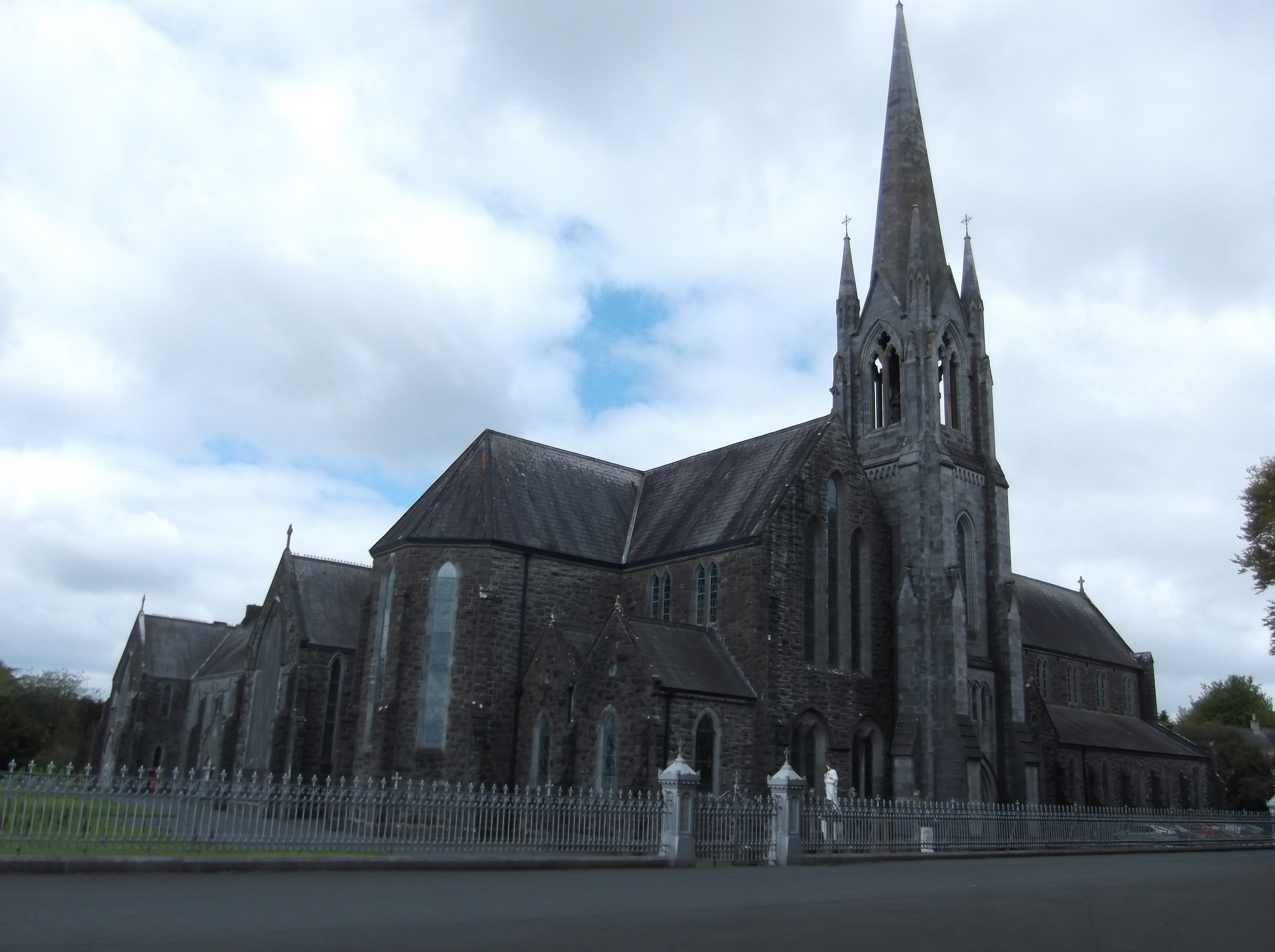
- Interactive map of Mount St. Joseph Abbey, Roscrea

Monastery information
- Order: Trappists
- Established: 21 March 1878
- Diocese: Killaloe

People
- Founder: Count Arthur Moore MP

Architecture
- Status: Active

Site
- Location: Roscrea, County Tipperary, Ireland
- Public access: Yes

Mount St. Joseph Abbey is an abbey of the Trappist branch of the Cistercians located in County Offaly, near Roscrea, County Tipperary in Ireland.

The abbey was founded in 1878 by a group of 32 monks from Mount Melleray Abbey, County Waterford, a number of years earlier Arthur John Moore MP of County Tipperary visited Mt Melleray petitioning for it. The church was opened for worship in 1883, on 600 acres in Mount Heaton, Roscrea, and a Boarding school - Cistercian College, Roscrea - was founded in 1905. The first superior was Dom Athanasius O'Donovan (born Daniel O'Donovan).

Mount St. Joseph contains several stained glass windows created by Harry Clarke or his studios. Three windows in the infirmary, three later windows in the chapel of the college and a 1960s window dedicated to St. Patrick for the abbey church.

Three foundations have been made from Mount Saint Joseph - Nunraw (Scotland) in 1946, Tarrawarra (Australia) in 1954, and Bolton Abbey, Moone, (County Kildare) in 1964.

Nationalist, MP, Catholic and Home Rule supporter Count Arthur John Moore, who donated the 600-acre property and buildings to the Cistercians, where the abbey and college are, is buried in Mount St Joseph.

== Abbots ==
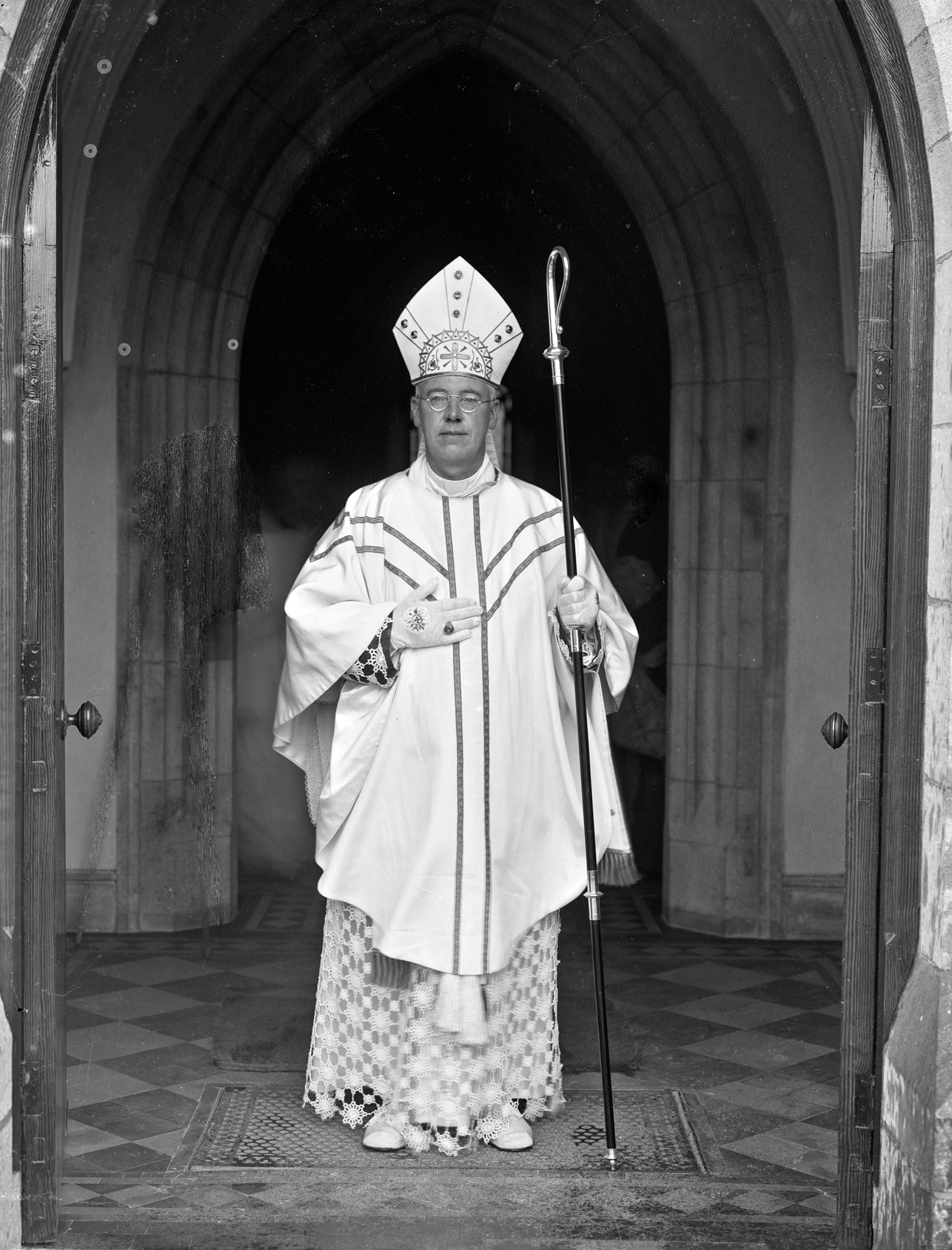
Rev. Camillus Claffey (Abbot from 1944 to 1962)

- Dom Athanasius Donovan (Prior)
- Dom Camillus Beardwood (1887)
- Dom Justin McCarthy (1911)
- Dom Camillus Claffey (1944)
- Dom Eugene Boylan (1962)
- Dom Colmcille O'Toole (1964-2000)
- Dom Laurence Walsh (2000)
- Dom Kevin Daly
- Dom Richard Purcell (2009-2017) - became Abbot of Mount Melleray
- Dom Malachy Thompson (Superior)

== See also ==
- Cistercian College, Roscrea
- Trappists
- Cistercians
- List of monastic houses in County Offaly
