= Chesters Hill Fort =

Hillfort in East Lothian, Scotland

Coordinates: 55°59′36.89″N 2°47′26.21″W

Chesters Hill Fort is an Iron Age hill fort in East Lothian, Scotland. It lies on the north facing slope of the Drem hills, 1 mile (2 kilometres) south of the small village of Drem, 1 1/2 mi (2.5 km) east of Ballencrieff Castle, 2 1/2 mi (4 km) north of Haddington, and 2 mi (3 km) west of Athelstaneford. The name "Chesters" comes from Latin castra, a fortified place.

This fortified village with its system of ramparts and ditches around a settlement of about twenty roundhouses is in the care of Historic Environment Scotland, who describe it as "one of the best-preserved examples in Scotland of an Iron age fort".

The hillfort was subject to a detailed programme of survey by Rampart Scotland.

== Photo gallery ==
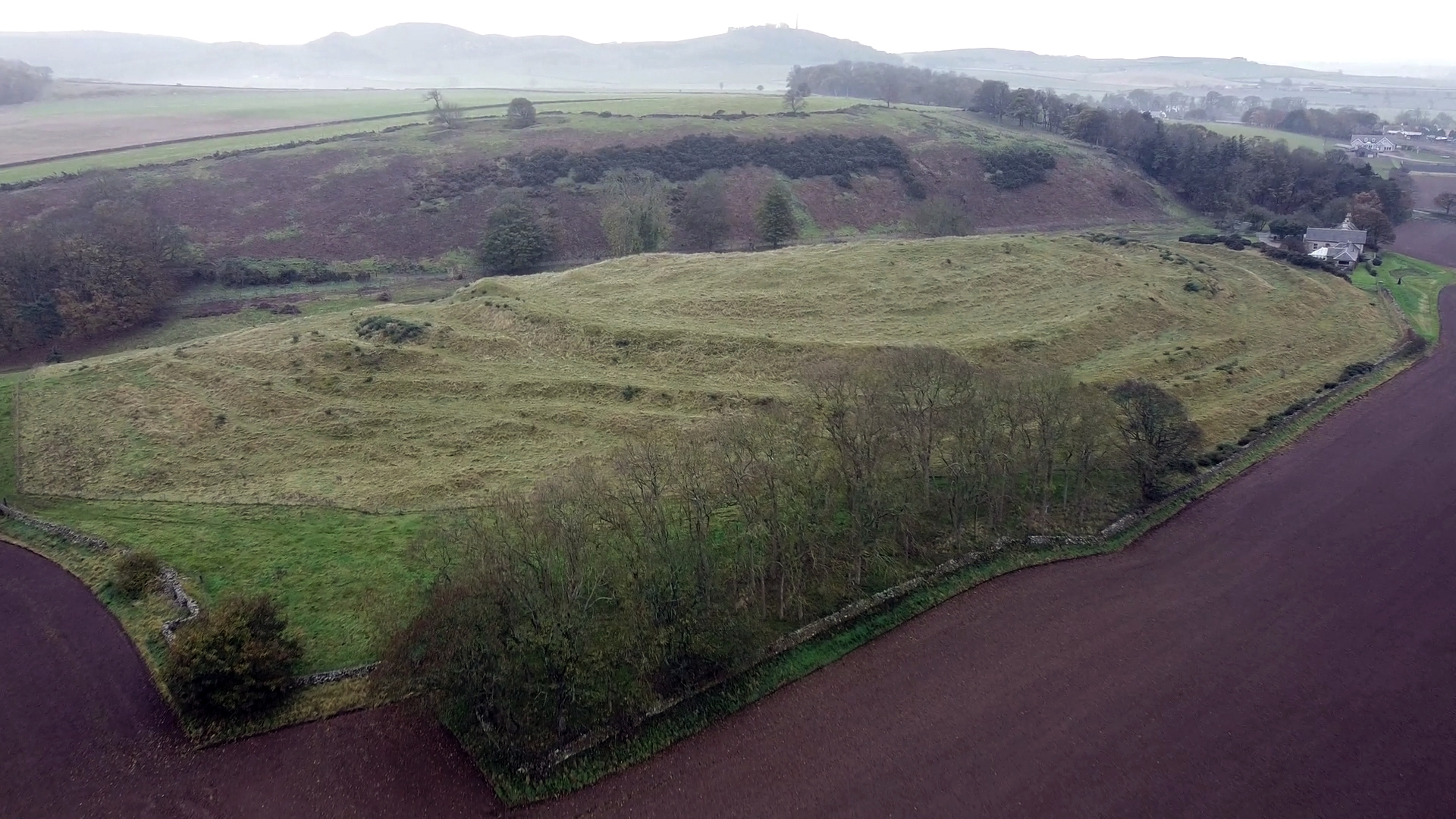

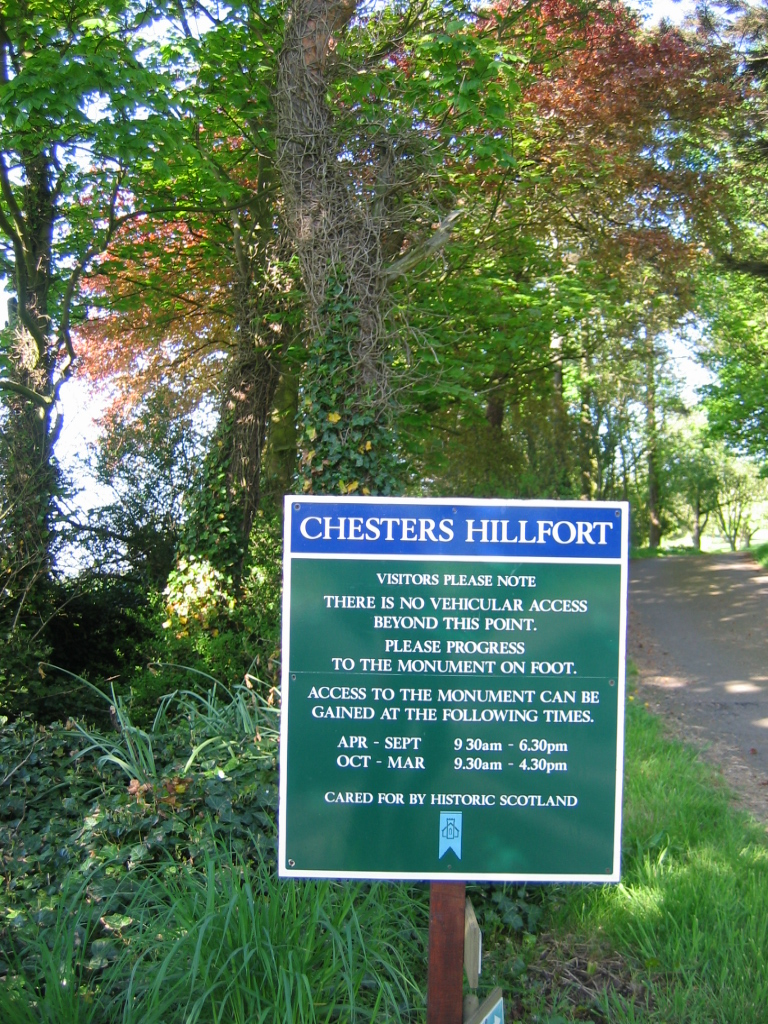

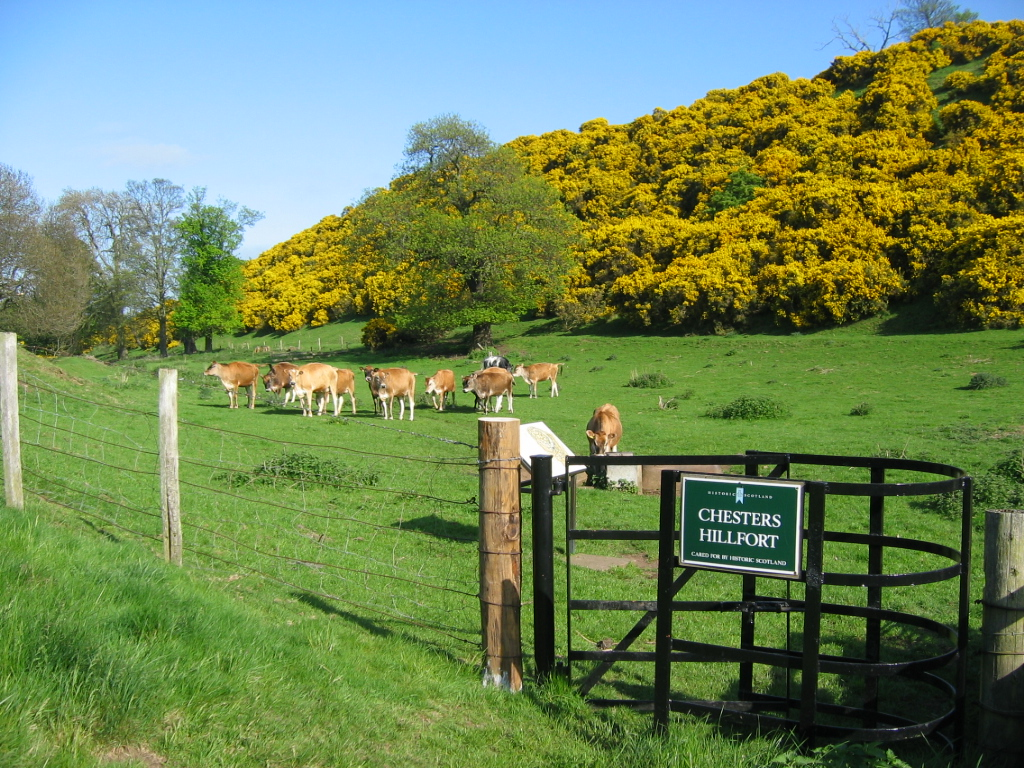

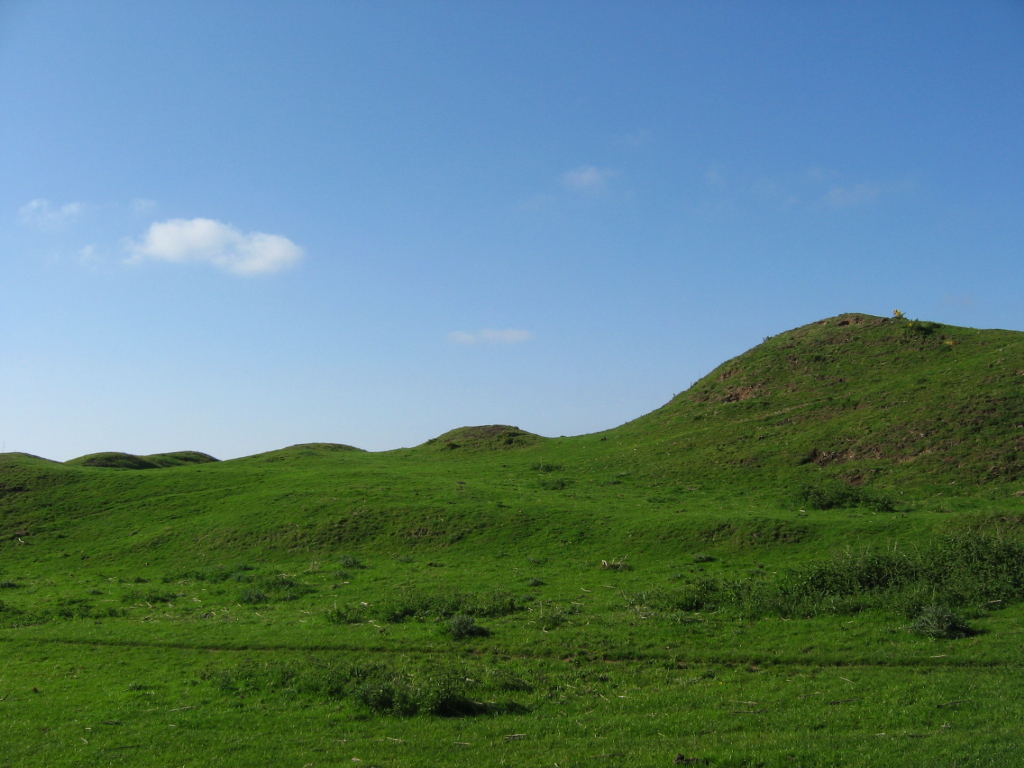

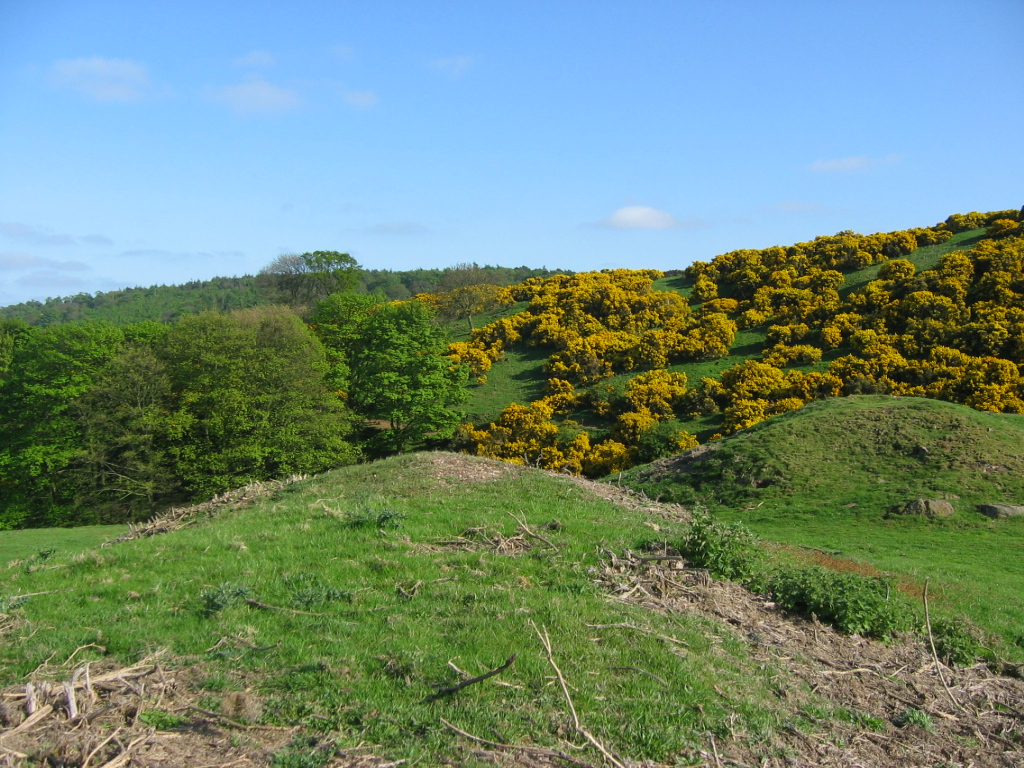

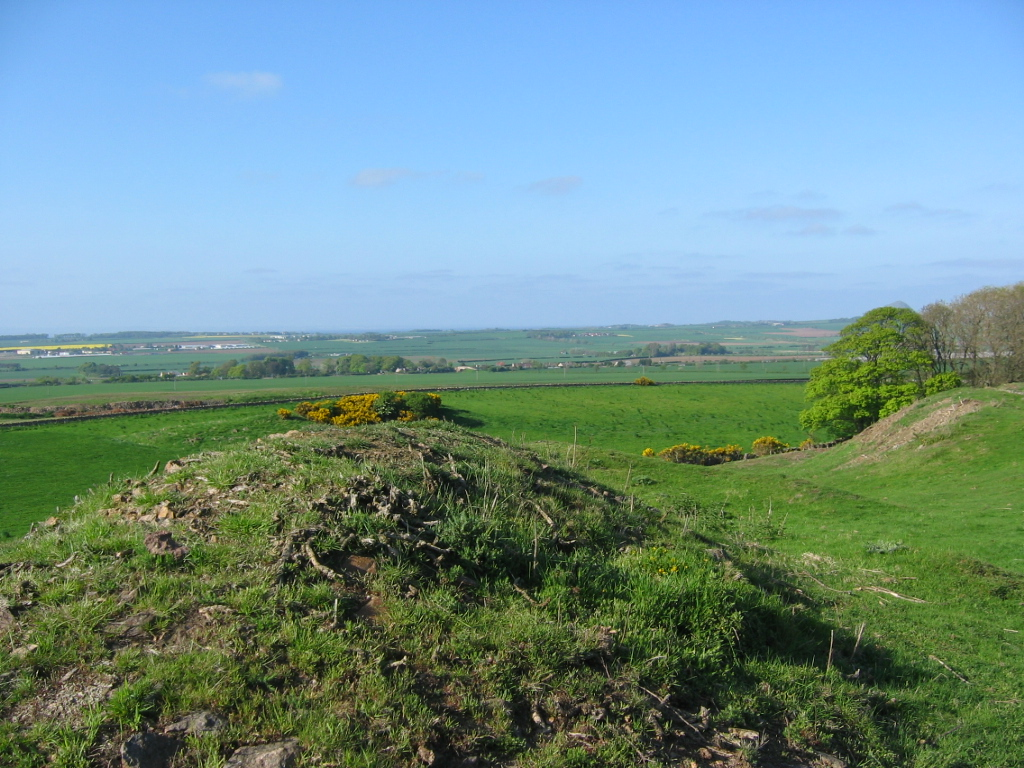

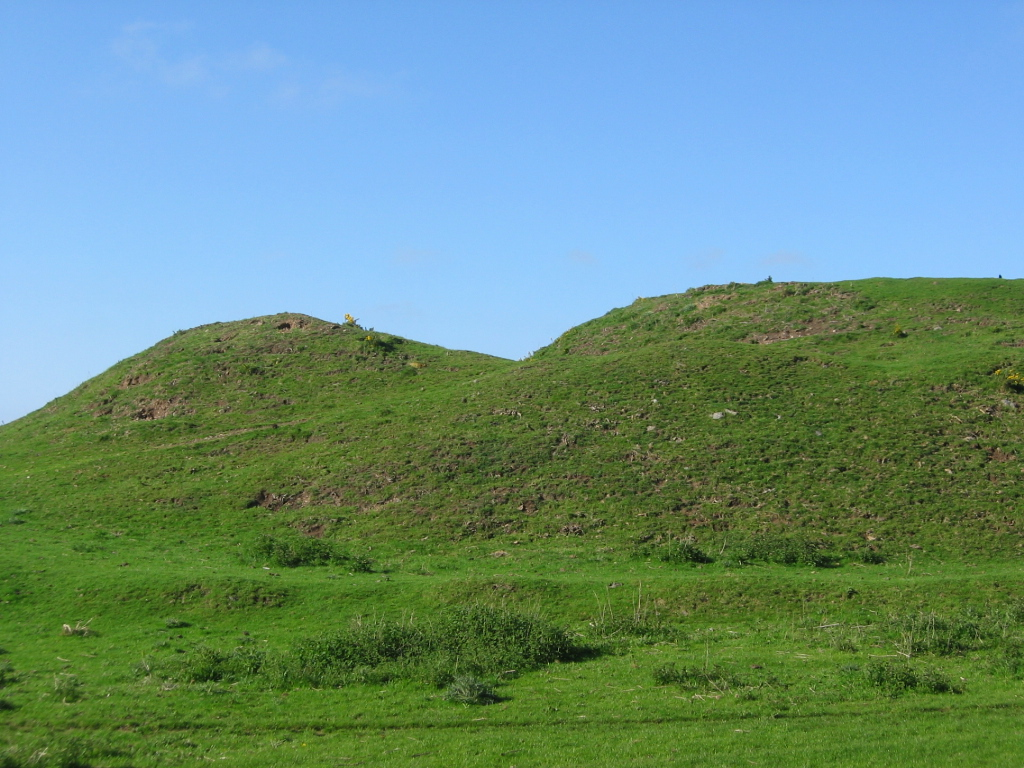

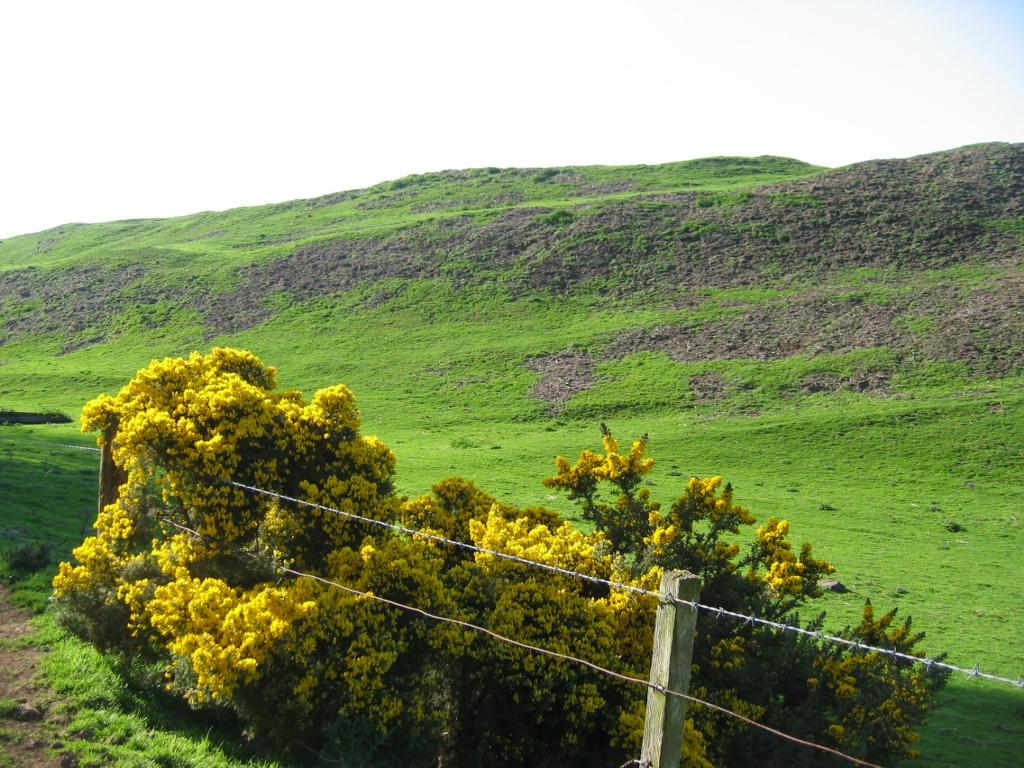

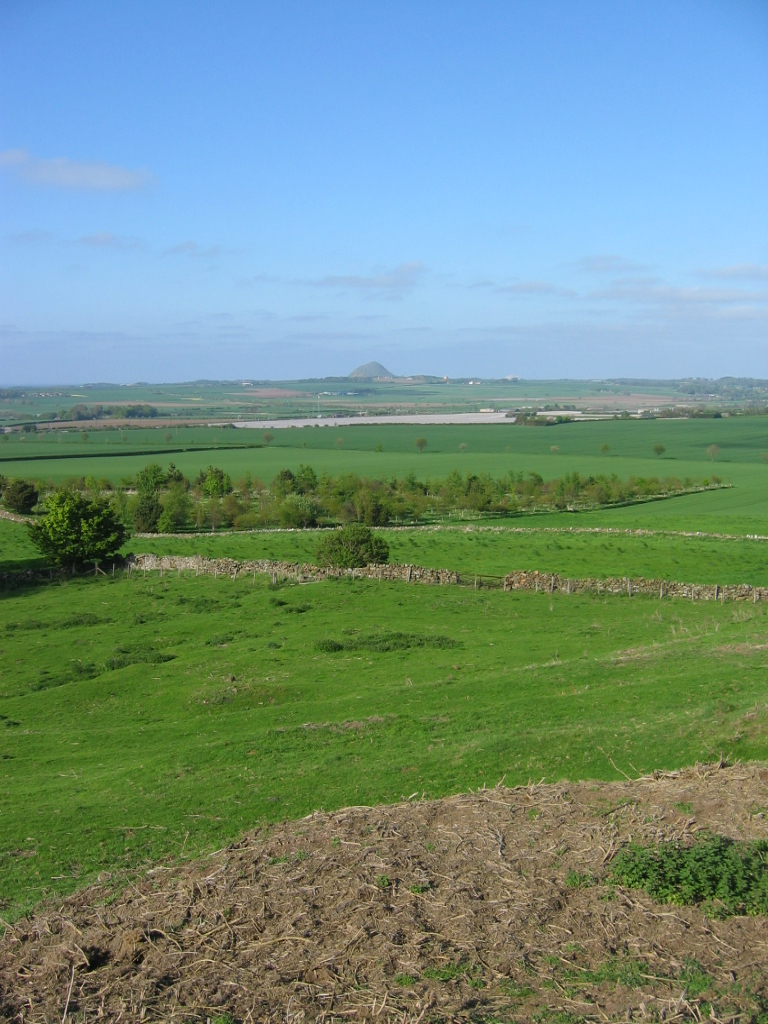

== See also ==
- List of hill forts in Scotland
- List of places in East Lothian
