= Surprenant =

Surprenant is a surname. Notable people with the surname include:

- Alex Surprenant (born 1989), soccer player
- Claude Surprenant, politician
- Danielle Surprenant (born 1985), director of athletics
- Heather Surprenant, politician

== See also ==
- Disappearance of Julie Surprenant
