= Holopainen =

Holopainen is a Finnish surname. Notable people with the surname include:

- Ale Holopainen (1908–1974), Finnish farmer and politician
- Ari Holopainen (born 1969), Finnish bandy player and head coach of the Finland national bandy team
- Elisa Holopainen (born 2001), Finnish ice hockey player
- Esa Holopainen (born 1972), the lead guitarist of Finnish metal band Amorphis
- Hanna Holopainen (born 1976), Finnish politician
- Jalmari Holopainen (1892–1954), Finnish footballer
- Mari Holopainen (born 1981), Finnish politician
- Pamela Holopainen (born 1981), young Inuk woman who disappeared in Timmins, Ontario in 2003
- Pietari Holopainen (born 1982), Finnish footballer
- Tuomas Holopainen (born 1976), the keyboardist of Finnish symphonic power metal band Nightwish
- Veijo-Lassi Holopainen (1921–2006), Finnish field hockey player
