= Disappearance of Melanie Ethier =

Disappearance of teenager from Ontario, Canada

Melanie Nadia Ethier
- Born: 25 December 1980
- Disappeared: 29 September 1996 (aged 15); New Liskeard, Ontario, Canada
- Status: Missing for 29 years, 11 months and 9 days
- Mother: Celine Ethier

Melanie Nadia "Mel" Ethier (born 25 December 1980) is a Canadian teenager who disappeared in New Liskeard, Ontario, in 1996. As of 2025, Ethier's whereabouts and the circumstances of her disappearance remain unknown.

== Background ==
Melanie Ethier was an honours student at École secondaire catholique Sainte-Marie in New Liskeard, Ontario. Ethier has been described as being "salt of the earth" and having a "lovely personality". She is the daughter of Celine Ethier, whose family had moved to the New Liskeard area when she was six years old. She acted as a "second mother" to her younger sister, Jessie, who was five years old in September 1996. She was one of only three Black girls in the community. Ethier's father, with whom she had no relationship, was from Botswana and met her mother while attending a mining school in neighbouring Haileybury, but was relocated to another school during the pregnancy and returned to Africa once his schooling was complete.

At the time of her disappearance, the combined population of New Liskeard and its neighbouring communities was roughly 11,000. Ethier was employed at a local daycare, the Garderie Richelieu, and learning self-defence from a family friend. She intended to become a teacher after graduating from high school. The Garderie Richelieu she worked at was attached to her high school; Ethier would open the facility early in the morning, go to school, return after school to help the younger children off the bus, and remain until it closed in the evening. Ethier's mother also worked at the daycare while also taking college courses in Sudbury.

In September 1996, Ethier stood 5'5" tall; weighed approximately 120 lbs; and had brown eyes and long, braided black hair. She was fond of wearing hair extensions. She had not been diagnosed with any mental illness and was not taking any medications, and friends who knew her at the time of her disappearance do not believe she was suffering from an undiagnosed condition.

== Disappearance ==
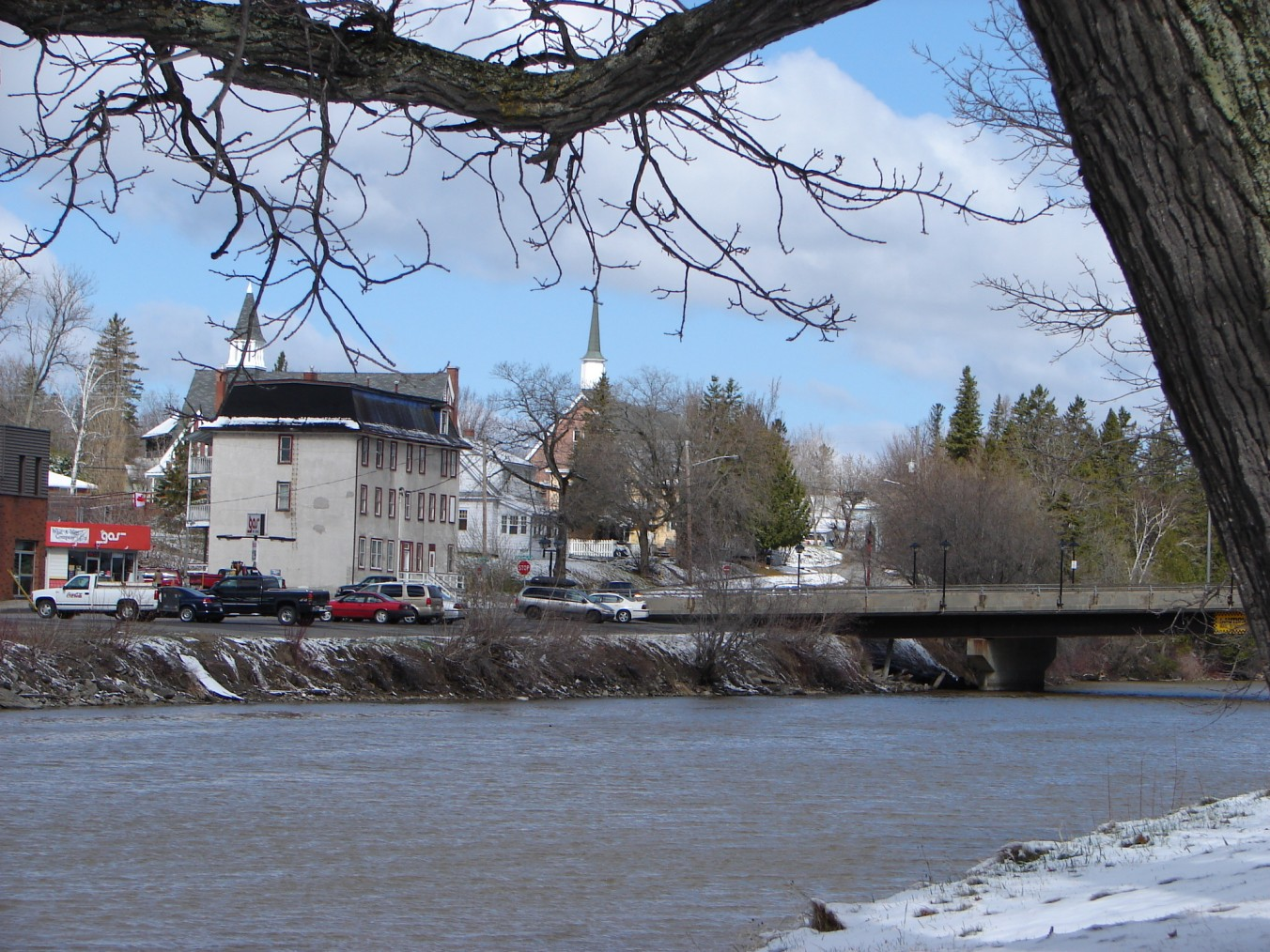
Ethier was last seen crossing to the south side of the Armstrong Street Bridge (right).

On the morning of Saturday 28 September 1996, Ethier visited the home of her mother's close friend, Sylvie Chartrand. Only Ethier, Chartrand, and Chartrand's six-year-old daughter Steffany were present at the house as Chartrand's partner, Denis Léveillé, and her son, Jason, were out of town. During this visit, Ethier broke a nail which caused her to become upset. Chartrand later speculated Ethier's disappointment over her broken nail was compounded by the family's financial difficulties, as their car was broken down and phone service to their house had been cut off the previous day due to unpaid bills. Ethier left the home and travelled downtown, by chance running into her best friend at a bus stop outside the New Liskeard Public Library. Her friend, who had been doing homework in the library, decided to abandon her schoolwork early and join Ethier.

The two girls visited several locations in New Liskeard, including a Pizza Pizza where they had lunch. Over pizza, Ethier floated the idea of becoming a teacher and volunteering in Botswana, the country her father was from. Ethier purchased candles, frosting, candy hearts, and a new cake pan to make a cake for her grandmother's birthday, which was going to be celebrated the next day before her grandparents went out of town. The pair also visited a house in nearby Dymond to collect money from someone Ethier had babysat for. At some point, the girls met up with Ethier's boyfriend, Neil Fortier, who she had been dating for three weeks; and their friends Dave Bromley, Jay Denomme, and Ryan Chatwin. Fortier described Ethier as being in a "good mood" that day and night.

The group stopped in at a video rental store around 21:00–21:30 EST and rented the movie Sudden Death. At 22:00 that evening, the group arrived at the Ethier home to watch the movie. Ethier's mother was spending time with Melanie's grandmother in their living room and suggested that her bedroom was too disorderly for hosting guests. Although given the choice to watch the film in her bedroom, Ethier told the teens they would have to watch the movie elsewhere and they left the residence. The group attempted to watch the movie at the home of Bromley's then-girlfriend, Samya Benchabi, who was unable to host them as her family was preparing for a move but joined them briefly as they walked to another house. Benchabi left the group when they reached the Armstrong Street bridge, at which point she returned home. Ethier's female friend complained that the air had turned cold around this time.

Shortly after 22:00, the group relocated to a house on Pine Avenue where Ryan Chatwin lived. Chatwin's parents were present in the house, but remained in their bedroom. Bromley returned home at this time. The house was a roughly ten or twelve-minute walk from the Ethier home, or about six blocks. According to those present, the teens watched the movie quietly in the basement while Chatwin's parents were asleep upstairs, and consumed no alcohol or drugs that evening; investigators have stated that they believe this to be true.

Before the movie finished, Denomme left the house at around 00:30–01:00 and returned home. Ethier's female friend also left early in order to catch a ride to Haileybury, also departing at around 00:30–01:00. While leaving the house, she encountered a suspicious vehicle which slowly approached her as she crossed through an intersection, as if assessing her. The girl was so unnerved by the incident that she ran from the scene to the next intersection by the Armstrong Street bridge, which was better lit. She followed the same route that Ethier is thought to have taken to Melanie's home, where Ethier's grandparents were waiting to take her home. She arrived at the Ethier residence shortly before 01:00, catching the last few minutes of Saturday Night Live before being driven home. The vehicle she encountered has been described as a white or light-coloured Chevrolet Monte Carlo or similar two-door model with signs of being in poor condition, including a grey patch on the right side which was likely hiding a hole or other damage. The witness believes the occupants were two teenage boys or young men, but that she can't remember ever seeing the car again. At the time of her departure, only three people remained in the house: Ethier, Fortier, and Chatwin.

Locations
1 Last known location.

The last confirmed sighting of Ethier was at around 01:30–02:00 on Sunday, 29 September 1996, when she left her friend's house and began making the 1 kilometre (3,300 ft) walk to her home alone and on foot. It was uncommon for Ethier to walk home by herself, but without phone service she could not call home for a ride. One of the boys escorted her to the door and watched her walk west down Pine Avenue East. At this time, she was wearing a green Nike windbreaker, a white t-shirt with a blue heart Pepe logo, blue jeans, a black belt with a silver buckle, black boots with a short heel, a necklace, and a watch.

Ethier's route would have taken her through three intersections, over the Armstrong Street bridge, past a gas station and apartment building, up a back alley or along a main road, and finally to the top of Church Street where the Ethier residence was located. After the bridge, the last stretch of her walk home involved a poorly-lit back road where the video rental store she had visited earlier in the day was located. The weather that evening was clear, and as it had only been two days since the previous full moon it is believed that there would have been some natural light along Ethier's route.

Celine became aware of her daughter's absence the next morning, when Melanie's alarm clock roused her at 06:00 or 07:30 and she discovered her daughter was not in her bedroom. As it was not uncharacteristic of Melanie to spend the night at her friend's house, Celine went back to bed and did not wake again until 08:00–09:00. Melanie's grandparents arrived at the house at 10:00 to celebrate her grandmother's birthday, at which point Melanie was supposed to have finished preparing the cake she had bought materials for the day before. Celine did not immediately suspect anything was amiss due to Melanie's habit of responsible behaviour, but she was alarmed when it became clear Melanie had not made it home the night before. Celine and her father drove to Tim Hortons to purchase a cake and call around in hopes of reaching Melanie, where she learned her daughter had left the Chatwin residence heading home. Melanie also did not appear at her daycare job as scheduled, prompting her mother to phone the New Liskeard Police Service at around 13:00 and report Melanie missing.

== Investigation ==
=== Initial search ===
The search for Melanie began on the afternoon of Sunday, 29 September 1996 at around 14:30–15:00. New Liskeard police dispatched officers to the Ethier residence and began a search of the area around the Armstrong Street bridge and along the banks of the Wabi River within hours of her being reported missing. Local police requested assistance from the Ontario Provincial Police (OPP) on Monday 30 September; a helicopter from Sudbury, a police dog team from North Bay, and a search and rescue dog from the Office of the Fire Marshal of Ontario were dispatched to expand the search around Pine Avenue, as were an OPP emergency search and rescue team and an Ontario Hydro helicopter the following day (Tuesday, 1 October). A psychic with a history of contributing to police investigations also joined the search.

Police stated that they checked all surveillance video taken along Ethier's route the night she vanished, as well as the visitor's log in the Wheel Inn Motel near Pine Avenue. In the days following, police surveillance was conducted on three local girls who may have been the intended targets of an attack on Ethier. These girls, other local teens, and an exotic dancer in Notre-Dame-du-Nord who bore a strong resemblance to Ethier were occasionally spotted by witnesses and mistakenly reported to police.

The weekend of 5–6 October, one week after Ethier disappeared, the 424 Transport and Rescue Squadron performed training exercises in the area and also participated in the search. On Tuesday, 8 October, an underwater search and rescue team began a three-day search of the Wabi River between the Armstrong Street bridge and Lake Temiskaming, though clay deposits in the river reduced their visibility and forced them to search by touch alone. At some point, a Lockheed C-130 Hercules military transport aircraft was also used to search the area. By mid-October, Ethier's case was listed with Crime Stoppers and the public was implored to phone in tips which could help investigators locate her.

Search teams were unable to find any signs indicating where Ethier had disappeared from or where she was taken. Officially, no evidence has been recovered in the case, though according to the Ethier family a single item may have been recovered by police on the first day of the search and never made public. OPP statements to the media made it clear detectives believed she had no reason to leave the community and suspected foul play. Police never recovered any security footage from the Night Owl convenience store, located one block away from the Pine Avenue residence. Shortly after Ethier's disappearance, missing person posters and billboards with her picture were put up in New Liskeard and surrounding communities; some of these remained in place as of 2020, and others have since been replaced. One particularly well-known billboard outside Latchford pairs a photo of Ethier with the question: "You know what happened to me - So why don't you help?".

Celine and volunteers from the community - including Jay Denomme, one of the boys present on the night of the disappearance - distributed posters in New Liskeard and communities as far as Timmins, Ottawa, and Montreal. Ethier also wrote a letter to the editor published in a November issue of the Temiskaming Speaker newspaper and sent information about Melanie to media companies in Toronto in the hopes of keeping attention on the case. ChildFind, a national charity dedicated to finding missing children and supporting their families, had begun circulating information about Melanie and her disappearance across Canada by December 1996.

=== 1997–1998 ===
Two officers assigned to work the case full-time, New Liskeard Police Sergeant Dwight Thib and OPP Detective Constable Bill Deverell, began reinterviewing witnesses in early 1997 in order to exhaust all possible leads in the case. OPP Inspector Pete Burns had taken over the case by September 1997, and Thib returned to regular police duties on 25 February 1998. The task force dedicated to searching for Ethier was formally disbanded in 1998, but both Thib and Deverell would continue to work on the case when new leads appeared. Deverell later said that he remained on the case up until the day of his retirement, 31 December 2002; Thib continued working on the case until he was attached to the OPP in 2007. Over the course of their investigation, the two officers interrogated hundreds of suspects and persons of interest. The OPP conducted another search for Melanie on 26 April 1999, focusing on the Dawson Point area to the east of New Liskeard which had previously not been investigated. In summer 2000, police seized materials from the landfill in McGarry as part of the investigation.

Shortly before Christmas 1996, the Tri-Town Region Crime Stoppers doubled the reward money offered to anyone who could resolve the case, bringing the value up to $2,000; in December 1998, the reward was increased to $25,000.

=== Later years ===
New Liskeard was amalgamated into the city of Temiskaming Shores in 2004, joining with the neighbouring communities of Haileybury, Dymond, and North Cobalt. The OPP took over law enforcement in the community in 2007. OPP Constable Jennifer Smith later admitted that some tips issued to New Liskeard police about the case may not have been passed on during the transfer of duties.

In 2010, an eyewitness account of Ethier crossing the Armstrong Street bridge was made public, and more details of the sighting were released in 2021. According to the witness, she and her husband were driving across the bridge when both spotted a teenaged black girl walking south on the eastern sidewalk. The night was clear and they saw no vehicles or other pedestrians on the bridge. At the time of this sighting, the girl was closer to the north end of the bridge. The witness commented that the girl seemed too young to be alone at night but was walking unbothered at a normal pace, while her husband remarked that he was not aware there were any black girls in New Liskeard. Although the witness believed the girl's hair may have been in dreadlocks, it is possible she misidentified the braided extensions Ethier wore. They did not report their account to police until 1997 or 1998 when they saw Ethier's photo. The tip was not properly logged into police records and would not be investigated until the 2000s when the witness approached Celine directly, at which point police were urged to revisit the sighting. Police said they were not made aware of this witness account until 2008.

A second witness came forward in 2008–2009 to state they had seen Ethier on the Armstrong Street bridge that night. According to the witness, they had been at the King George Tavern, located two blocks from the south end of the bridge, until around 01:00 when they picked up food and coffee at a nearby restaurant, Norm's Forum. As they were being driven home by their friend, the witness spotted a girl near the midway point of the bridge around 01:45–01:50. From her backseat view, the witness saw the girl walking on the bridge's western sidewalk when a car pulled over and two young men exited the vehicle. The boys then proceeded to corner the girl and coerce her into entering their vehicle before speeding off. The witness recalled the vehicle being a small blue or light-coloured sedan, but could not remember what the girl she saw looked like. Police detective Rob Matthews has expressed doubt about the authenticity of this version of events, and has stated that media reports about similar sightings have caused an influx of non-credible tips from people who allege they saw an abduction take place on the bridge.

Another witness, who had lived on Rebecca Street just off Pine Avenue and near Doc's, took her story to police in 2019. In a 2021 interview, this witness (known to the public only as "Denise") disclosed that at around 01:45 on 29 September 1996 she was doing schoolwork in her room when she heard a girl screaming outside. Although she initially ignored the outburst, she heard more screaming about 45 seconds later and became frightened. After checking that her front door was locked, the witness snuck to her bay window and saw three silhouettes of people running down the street towards Pine Avenue, but no vehicles or headlights. Her husband, who was also home at the time, did not witness the event as he was asleep.

In 2020, the OPP declassified parts of Ethier's female friend's account of the evening, in which she described being spooked by a vehicle after leaving the Pine Avenue residence. Remaining anonymous, this friend has only ever spoken to the media about her experience twice and has since moved overseas.

The release of The Next Call, a podcast about Ethier's case from the creator of Someone Knows Something, led to another witness coming forward in 2021. According to police, the anonymous male witness was unknown to investigators before getting in touch after hearing the podcast. The tip led police to Larocque Field in North Cobalt, roughly 10 km from Ethier's last known location, where OPP officers and the Northeast Emergency Response Team surveyed the site with the assistance of search dogs and drones on 12–14 October 2021. The heavily forested terrain made looking for evidence difficult, and police suggested they would have to schedule additional days to continue searching the area.

=== Current status ===
The police investigation into Ethier's disappearance has remained active since 1996. The investigation is currently handled by the Temiskaming Branch of the OPP in collaboration with the OPP Crime Unit, and is led by senior officer Detective Inspector Rob Matthews and lead detective Investigator Kori Betts; Detective Sergeant Lisa Laxton, who was lead investigator on the case prior to 2021, is now employed by the police as an Investigations Coordinator. The province of Ontario currently offers a $50,000 reward for information that leads to an arrest or conviction for those responsible for Ethier's disappearance.

All of the OPP's information about the case has been uploaded to Powercase, a newly implemented major case management system which alerts detectives to similar details in other investigations and could tie Ethier's disappearance into a wider crime spree. Tips generated by this system have led to several digs in the Temiskaming area which have failed to uncover Ethier's remains. In 2010, the OPP stated having received over 700 tips from 500 witnesses relevant to the Ethier case, as well as having over 300 persons of interest; in 2020, they were receiving on average 2–3 tips per month about the case. The OPP has also gone on record to say they follow up on tips offered to them by psychics, though in 2021 Detective Inspector Rob Matthews said a particular psychic who frequently posts to YouTube claiming to be in contact with Ethier's spirit has "created nothing but issues" for investigators.

Celine told reporters in 2017 that she no longer believed her daughter was still alive, and in a 2021 interview said she has felt this way since the third day of the search. Investigators also believe Melanie Ethier is deceased.

=== Theories ===
Suggestions about what happened to Ethier are mostly speculative, as almost no evidence is known to the public. The OPP has disclosed very little information in the hopes of preserving the integrity of their investigation. The theory favoured by the OPP is that Ethier was driven away from the search area by a car on the night of her disappearance, either abducted by a stranger or lured into the vehicle by someone she knew. The search is complicated by the Trans-Canada Highway, which passes by the community and makes the possibility of a random assault by someone from outside the community more likely.

The suggestion that Ethier was taken by her estranged father has been dismissed by the OPP, who have eliminated him as a suspect. Celine has criticized the unlikely theory that her daughter was forced into a sex trafficking ring. One theory which posits that Ethier fell into the Wabi River and drowned has been dismissed by her family, as she knew how to swim and no remains were ever recovered from the river.

Celine considers the North Cobalt cemetery to be the most likely spot where Melanie's body could be buried, as one of the suspects - Denis Léveillé - once worked for the cemetery and was very familiar with the surrounding area. In 2010, the television documentary Chasing Ghosts suggested Ethier could be one of over 600 unidentified decedents whose remains are kept in Canadian morgues and cemeteries.

==== Gauthier murders ====
In April 1996, 47-year-old Louis Gauthier had been murdered in Thornloe, twenty minutes north of New Liskeard, by two minors: Michael Lafreniere (identified in court documents as "M.L."), who Gauthier had engaged in a sexual relationship with; and his half-brother, 17-year-old Robert Goulet (identified in court documents as "R.G." and sometimes reported in the media as "Robert Laffrenier"). The boys' uncle, Gregory Crick, helped plan the attack. Crick suspected Goulet was drawing unwanted attention to their family and that he had informed the police of their involvement in Gauthier's murder. Goulet went missing in New Liskeard on 6 or 8 November in what appeared at the time to be another teen vanishing. Goulet's body was found in a Hilliardton gravel pit in April 1998, and was ultimately determined to have been stabbed by either Lafreniere or Crick. The surviving brother and Crick were arrested for the murder of Gauthier in December 1996.

No link was ever formally established between the Gauthier murders and Ethier's disappearance. Investigators - including OPP Detective Constable Bill Deverell, who worked both cases; then-New Liskeard Police Chief Doug Jelly; and OPP Detective Inspector Rob Matthews, senior officer on the case as of 2021 - have denied any connection. According to police, Goulet attended a party in October or early November 1996 where he had allegedly admitted to disposing of a body by putting it through a wood chipper.

==== Denis Léveillé ====
A friend of the Ethier family, Denis Euclide Léveillé, has been suggested as a likely suspect in the case. Léveillé was in a long-term relationship with Sylvie Chartrand, best friend to Ethier's mother, and they remained in a relationship for 37 years until his death in 2016. Chartrand's son and daughter were close in age to Ethier and her sister Jessie, respectively, and they have been described as being like siblings to each other. Léveillé worked as a driller in mines, sometimes leaving New Liskeard for as long as four months to work in distant places like the Northwest Territories, Mongolia, Chile, and parts of Africa. He stood 5'8–5'9 ft (1.73–1.75 m) tall and weighed around 280 pounds (130 kg), and in 1996 alternated between driving a white or grey pickup truck and his mother's small, grey four-door car.

According to what Léveillé told his partner in life, he had been sexually abused by various young men, including babysitters, when he was a child. He was also physically abused by his parents, who were both heavy drinkers and negligent towards Léveillé's siblings, leaving him to care for them. Léveillé had been injured in a head-on collision on 17 June 1990 when his vehicle was struck by a young woman driving while intoxicated. He suffered damage to his back, legs, and toes, and as a result of the accident required dynamic compression plates and a back brace to walk, though he did so with difficulty and continued to lose mobility over time. Although he would be awarded $600,000 in a 1993 civil suit, Léveillé would continue to live with chronic pain and was put on a variety of pain medications, including OxyContin, before turning to other substances like cocaine, cannabis, and Percocet to deal with the pain. Much of the money Léveillé received from his civil suit was invested in a business which later failed, forcing him to return to work in the mining industry despite his disability.

On the weekend of Ethier's disappearance, Léveillé and his stepson, Jason, had told his partner they were going out of town fishing with Léveillé's brother Andre and Jason's friend Joel. Léveillé later said this had been a lie, and that they had attended a motocross competition in North Bay that Saturday. Andre was a motocross racer, and there were several race tracks active in the area at the time. This alibi was later corroborated by Jason in a 2021 interview, though he also said his memory of that weekend is spotty due to the trauma of losing Ethier. Andre has denied any memory of where they had gone that weekend. Joel has said he was at a large house party in New Liskeard that weekend, and if they had attended a motocross competition it would have only been a day trip. At some point, Léveillé told his partner he had spent some time at a bar that weekend without Jason or Joel. They returned home sometime between 12:00–16:00 on 29 September. That afternoon, Léveillé told several neighbours he was assisting with the search and even borrowed his friend's dog to offer its services to police, which investigators have confirmed as true.

The day after Ethier was reported missing, her grandmother had an unnerving encounter with Léveillé when he came into the Ethier residence's basement to smoke a cigarette, which she considered odd as he had never been down there before and Celine did not allow smoking in her home. Three days into the investigation, Léveillé commented to the grandmother that the person who had harmed her daughter would have had to be very strong as she was capable of defending herself, and to prove his point Léveillé showed the grandmother deep nail marks on his arms which he said Ethier had made while they were play fighting. At this point, Celine became very suspicious of Léveillé, as according to his own version of events he had gone out of town on the Friday before Ethier disappeared and only returned after she was reported missing, making it impossible for him to have encountered Ethier on the morning she had visited his home. When pressed, Léveillé told Celine he had seen her daughter working as a stripper in nearby Notre-Dame-du-Nord, though this was later found to have been a black woman who bore a passing resemblance to Ethier. In the years following these interactions, Celine distanced her family from Léveillé over her suspicions. On two occasions he called Celine while in a hotel room threatening suicide. On both occasions, Ethier attended to Léveillé believing he was prepared to make a confession about his role in the case, but he did not.

Other people who knew Léveillé have also voiced their suspicions about the scratches on his arm, which extended from his wrist to his elbow. Chartrand recalls him showing her the marks on the afternoon after Ethier disappeared, saying she had made them while they were play fighting, though she could not understand when they would have seen each other as the marks looked fresh. Later that day, Léveillé told his neighbour, Jocelyn Martel, that the marks were caused by him brushing up against branches while looking for Ethier in the woods. Martel estimated the marks were about one or two days old, as they were only just starting to scab, and believed they were caused by nail scratches. Neither of Léveillé's children believe they ever witnessed him play fight with Ethier.

Léveillé had a long history of making sexual advances against minors, though not everyone in his life was aware of the extent of this behaviour. His partner was aware of at least a few occasions on which he had made advances towards his daughter's friends, and some friends knew he was a pedophile. Lionel Martel, Léveillé's best friend, later told media that he had warned his friend not to make sexual advances towards teenage girls and that later in life Léveillé would occasionally, while under the influence of drugs, mention Ethier and another girl with a "weird" name while saying "they'll never find them". Léveillé spent several months in prison for drugging and sexually abusing one of Martel's nieces, though he had lied about his whereabouts after being released and told Martel he had been working on his uncle's farm in Alberta. A friend later told police that on one occasion when Léveillé had spotted an unfamiliar black girl in town, he commented that he had an affinity for "black chocolate". Steffany Chartrand, Léveillé's daughter, has said it was "very apparent that he was a sexual predator for underage girls" and as a teenager she would have to check in on her friends to be sure they made it home if he had given them a ride home. In a 2021 interview, Chartrand stated that six of her friends had come forward to describe Léveillé sexually harassing or assaulting them. At least one of the girls Léveillé harassed was aware of other girls he had abused before being abused herself.

On one occasion around 2000, Léveillé followed one of his daughter's friends into the sunroom of his house and told the girl he would like to make her experience an orgasm. Léveillé had a falling out with his brothers around this time, with at least one of them making it clear he was no longer allowed to be around his niece. Years later, Léveillé was briefly jailed for sexually assaulting one of his daughter's friends in the family home as his daughter and partner were asleep; he was acquitted in court and released. In 2014, Léveillé was sentenced to serve time in prison after pleading guilty to a similar offence, and was released after several months. Léveillé's stepson also said his uncle Andre, who was allegedly with Léveillé the weekend of Ethier's disappearance, had made sexual comments about a 12-year-old neighbour in the early 1990s.

On multiple occasions Léveillé lured teenage girls to a hotel room, often by telling them or their families that he needed a babysitter for a fictional child. Around ten years after Ethier disappeared, Léveillé lured her younger sister Jessie with a similar trick. Léveillé's father had recently died and he offered the younger Ethier work cleaning his mother's house that afternoon, but instead drove her to a hotel on the outskirts of New Liskeard and coaxed her inside. Léveillé locked the door and consumed a significant amount of cocaine while stripping naked and making sexual comments towards Jessie. Léveillé alternated between sitting on the bed and in the room's hot tub for four hours as Ethier pretended to text on her phone to avoid his advances. Jessie had plans to meet her boyfriend at around 14:45 that day, and finally convinced Léveillé to let her leave around this deadline; she completely cut ties with him and the Chartrand family after this incident, which convinced her he could have had a role in her sister's disappearance.

One woman (known in the media only as 'Josephine') interviewed for The Next Call stated that Léveillé had come to Sudbury and arranged for her to babysit for his girlfriend at a remote hotel but confessed this was a lie while driving her there, then spent the next two hours commenting on her body while drinking heavily. According to Josephine, Léveillé later spread rumours that they had sex that night, and his behaviour led her to believe he was responsible for assaulting Melanie Ethier, saying that he may have tried a similar plot on Ethier and reacted violently if she rebuked him. In 2012, Léveillé arranged for a teenaged girl to babysit his granddaughter, which she found to be a lie when she arrived at his hotel room and Léveillé began making sexual advances; the girl later pressed charges, and he was eventually sentenced to serve time in prison for the offence.

Léveillé was charged with criminal offences at least three times: in 2006 for failing to comply with orders not to associate or communicate with several people; in 2012 for making death threats, committing assault with a vehicle, possessing an illegal taser, and violating the terms of his parole; and in 2013 for sexual interference with someone under the age of 16. While in prison, Léveillé was visited by Celine, who directly asked about his involvement in her daughter's case, but Léveillé said he could never hurt Melanie and suggested Goulet had murdered her. After his release, Celine again tried to make contact with Léveillé, but he suffered a debilitating stroke the evening before she planned to confront him, paralyzing him down one side of his body and limiting his ability to vocalize to just one sound which witnesses say resembled the word "away". According to his family, the stress around having to speak with Celine and the police may have caused him such serious stress that it triggered the stroke.

In a brief conversation just four hours before his stroke, Léveillé had met with his daughter Steffany Chartrand and asked her to speak for him when he spoke to Celine and the police. Chartrand said her father confessed to lying about his alibi for the weekend of Ethier's disappearance, saying he had been at a motocross competition and had driven there in his sister-in-law's car, either a beige Ford Tempo or blue Toyota Tercel; however, she and her brother Jason have cast doubt on this version of events as well, as three of the four people who went on the trip owned pickup trucks better suited to transporting a dirt bike, and his sister-in-law has no memory of what she was doing that weekend besides the moment she learned about Ethier being reported missing. Two weeks later, on 8 January 2016, Léveillé died in hospital.

Following his death, Léveillé's family said that they had come into possession of his medical records which indicate he experienced dissociative identity disorder. Steffany has described witnessing her father's expression and mood change from his normal state into a more aggressive, predatory one suddenly on multiple occasions, and has said the diagnosis helps explain some of his behaviour that had previously been attributed to drug use. Chartrand has also stated that Léveillé once confessed to her that he had dreams where he was Ethier's killer. While hospitalized after his stroke, Léveillé was approached by a private investigator who attempted to question him about the disappearance. When the detective left, Léveillé used his non-paralyzed hand to grab his daughter's scarf and pull on it tightly, weakly strangling her until she offered to tell investigators to leave him alone. According to family Léveillé did not begin exhibiting this behaviour until around 1990, though one of his accusers said he sexually assaulted her in the 1980s when he was fourteen years old. In June 2021, two friends of Léveillé came forward to say he had driven to their house while under the influence in 2013 or 2014 and confessed to killing Ethier, though he refused to say what he did with her body and later threatened them if they ever shared what he'd told them. Celine has alleged that her daughter's body may be buried on these friends' sprawling property, which they purchased in May 1996 and allowed Léveillé to access freely for many years.

Celine maintains that she considers Léveillé the prime suspect in her daughter's disappearance, and does not believe that police made an appropriate effort to investigate him while he was alive. Celine was not contacted by police until 2021. Sylvie Chartrand has stated police only spoke to her about Ethier's disappearance one time, months after the fact, and never spoke to Léveillé while he was alive. Police only began speaking to Léveillé's daughter in spring 2021, and have never spoken to his stepson despite him being part of his alibi for the weekend Ethier disappeared. Some of Léveillé's accusers have never been spoken to by police. In a 2021 interview, Sylvie stated she agreed with Celine that Léveillé was responsible for what happened to her daughter. Police contend that they investigated Léveillé before his death but have offered no further comments.

Andre has expressly doubted his brother could have been involved in a violent crime and stated having no memory of where he was that weekend. Andre and his long-term partner separated in 2020, but she likewise does not believe either of the Léveillé brothers were involved in what happened to Ethier.

Last known locations of Tammy Lynn Lamondin-Gagnon
1 Millard Street in Stouffville
2 Fairy Lake Park

David Ridgen, the presenter of the Next Call podcast, suggests Léveillé may even have been responsible for other unsolved murders in the region, including those of Tammy Lynn Lamondin-Gagnon in May 1999, Pamela Jayne Holopainen in December 2003, and Christina Calayca in August 2007.

==== Mistaken identity ====
In 1996, Goulet and his half-brother Lafreniere publicly accosted two black girls with racial slurs and threatened to shoot them. One of the targeted individuals, known in the media only as "Sarah", was often said to look very similar to Ethier, to the point they were often confused for each other by locals and even their own relatives. Sarah occasionally purchased drugs from the brothers. On Friday, 27 September 1996, Sarah told a friend that she owed money to a local drug dealer and was afraid for her life, telling the confidant not to be surprised if she went missing over the weekend. She had also spoken to police before the incident, providing information on the activities of a group of three local boys. Sarah, who lived on Pine Avenue at the time, was not made aware of the Ethier disappearance until Monday 30 September. At this point, Sarah (who also went by the name "Sierra") began to refer to herself as "Melanie" and dress in clothes similar to those worn by Ethier on the night of her disappearance. Days after the incident, Sarah told several people that she was Ethier at a bowling alley in Haileybury. Sarah moved to North Bay sometime after 1998, and appears in her school yearbooks in 1997 and 1998, despite a rumour which alleged she left town weeks after the disappearance. She then moved to Vancouver, British Columbia. Aside from a voicemail left for her mother in February 2020, she has cut off all contact with her friends and family; her current whereabouts and status are unknown. Peers who attended school in the area at the same time as Ethier have doubted someone would be targeted over a debt, as the illegal drugs circulating at the time would not have been expensive enough to justify murdering someone who could not afford to pay back what they owed.

Ethier and Sarah were familiar with each other, and with the only other Black girl in town. In a 2020 interview, the third person in this group rejected the notion that Ethier was the target of a spontaneous racially motivated hate crime and stated she did not believe the attack was random. She also suggested that violent and racist threats made against her by Robert Goulet and his brother could suggest she was their intended target that night. Dave Bromley, a friend of Ethier's, does not agree that she resembled the other girls in the area and does not believe it was mistaken identity that led to her being targeted. At the time of her disappearance, Ethier had extensions which gave her hair extra length, discerning her from the other Black girls in town who had shorter hairstyles.

Melanie Louise Ethier has also been suggested as a possible target for the attack. Born in 1979, she was only a year older than Melanie Nadia Ethier and both attended École secondaire catholique Sainte-Marie at the same time. After the disappearance, police told Melanie Louise Ethier that they believed she may have been the intended target the night her namesake went missing. In a 2020 interview she recalled that police were interested in her friendship with another student who was actively dating Lafreniere and suspected that the brothers may have believed she knew about their criminal activities. In addition, Ethier's mother was the cousin of Louis Gauthier, who they had murdered in April 1996. After questioning why they would mistake someone of a completely different height, build, and race for her, police told Ethier the brothers may have asked someone else to attack her and, knowing only her first and last names, that person had gone after the wrong individual. Ethier alleges that the last time she spoke to Lafreniere was in a park near her home, where he behaved anxious and insisted somebody was watching them. He asked Ethier if she believed he had killed her cousin; she denied any suspicions, but later stated that she did believe he was involved in both the murder of Gauthier and the disappearance of Melanie Nadia Ethier.

As recently as 2021, police have stated they do not believe Ethier was attacked because she had been mistaken for someone else.

==== Local suspects ====
After May 1996, bars in Ontario were able to remain open until 02:00, while bars in Quebec could stay open until 03:00. Witnesses who were in the bar Doc's the night of 28–29 September 1996 have submitted tips to investigators stating that they saw an intoxicated patron leave the bar early in order to reach a bar across the provincial border before last call, and that one of these drivers may have struck Ethier with their car. A 1999 search of the area east of New Liskeard was sparked by a tip sent to police alleging that Ethier had been hit by a car on the night of her disappearance. The tipster said that the person responsible was driving with a suspended license and had only recently been let out of jail, and in a panic loaded Ethier's body into their trunk and buried her at Dawson's Point. Although police investigated the site, no remains were found. In 2000, police retrieved materials from the landfill in McGarry Township while investigating a rumour suggesting a group of teens from Virginiatown was responsible for Ethier's disappearance. In a 2021 interview, Dave Bromley (who had been with Ethier the night of her disappearance) said he believed the drunk driving theory was plausible, but that it did not make sense for someone exiting the bar to stalk and assault her as the area between Doc's and the bridge was too well-lit and patrolled by police.

White supremacist groups were active in the Temiskaming area in the 1990s, and Ethier's disappearance was considered a likely hate crime in the early days of the investigation. Before Ethier went missing she was one of only three Black girls in New Liskeard; following her disappearance, the other girls were placed under police surveillance in case they were targeted next. In an interview for the investigative podcast The Next Call, one of the men who had been with Ethier the night of 28 September 1996 described New Liskeard as a "discriminatory ... old hick town" and recalled instances of homophobic harassment against a local teenager from around the time of the disappearance. In another interview for the same podcast, Melanie's younger sister, Jessie Ethier, describes having to change schools often to get away from racist abuse before finally switching to homeschooling, and has since moved to Southern Ontario to avoid having to raise her own children in such an environment.

According to locals, there was a known fishing spot located under the Armstrong Street bridge, accessible by foot paths in the area. It is possible a witness or suspect may have been night fishing for walleye at the time of the disappearance.

==== Assault by friends ====
Police first took statements from the boys on Monday, 30 September at their high school, with the vice principal as the only other adult present. Rumours about their involvement in the mystery negatively affected the mental health of all three boys. Two investigators, OPP Constable Kevin Murphy and New Liskeard Police Detective Dwight Thib, made a more forceful attempt to question two of the boys - Jay Denomme and Neil Fortier - later in the investigation, entering the Fortier home and cornering the teenagers. During this interaction, Denomme phoned his father who instructed him to say nothing until he arrived and then rushed to the house, confronting the police and warning them they would face consequences if they made any more attempts to interrogate the boys (who were still minors at the time) without their parents present. Police only interviewed Dave Bromley once, with him seated in the back of a police cruiser parked in his parents' driveway. Of the three, only Fortier was ever asked to take a polygraph test, which he passed, though the other two both volunteered to be tested.

Ethier's then-boyfriend Neil Fortier would later state that his biggest regret in life was not walking her home that night. He has also stated that even decades later some locals continue to accuse him of being responsible for the disappearance, either through negligence or by murdering her. Ryan Chatwin, whose family lived in the Pine Avenue residence where Ethier spent her last night, has also stated he feels extraordinary guilt for not having the foresight to walk her home, and his family has also expressed deep guilt. In a 2021 interview, Jay Denomme said he still thinks about Melanie multiple times per week. Although he does not believe the others present that night were involved in what happened to Ethier, Dave Bromley has stated he remains critical of their decision not to walk her home.

Celine Ethier has repeatedly stated she does not blame the Chatwin family or Melanie's friends for her daughter's disappearance and does not suspect they were involved. Melanie's best friend at the time stated in a 2021 interview that she believes the accusations made against the boys who were present that night are unfounded, and that it is "unfair" to criticize them for not walking her home as prior to the disappearance many in the community felt their town was a safe place.

Another boy who had dated Ethier for some time prior to the summer of 1996 was also eliminated as a suspect early on in the investigation.

==== Assault by stranger ====
Bars in the area (including Doc's, located on Armstrong Street only a block away from the Pine Avenue residence) would have been closing at around the time Ethier began walking home, putting her on the streets at the same time as the bar's inebriated patrons. Witnesses described two female hitchhikers seen outside Doc's at 02:10 who were later identified by police and ruled out as suspects. As it was a busy Saturday night, police officers in two cruisers had been assigned to monitor the bar but did not note any suspicious activity; they were the only officers on duty that night. There were also three weddings and possibly a small party going on elsewhere on Pine Avenue on the weekend of 28–29 September 1996, and someone who had been drinking at a get-together or was from out of town may have come across Ethier and seized on the opportunity to assault her. Ethier's route would also have taken her past two gas stations, an Esso and a Mr. Gas, both of which are likely to have been open at the time she walked by. Friends of Ethier have stated she would likely not have voluntarily entered a stranger's car, and would only have accepted a ride from somebody she knew, but had she been forced it is unlikely she could have fended off a group of people or a fully-grown adult. True crime podcaster David Ridgen has stated he believes one of the most likely theories is that Ethier was ambushed from someone standing near or sitting inside a vehicle.

Pete Gilboe, a decorated conservation officer with the Ministry of Natural Resources and Forestry who operated in New Liskeard from 2001 to 2020, said in a 2020 interview that he doubts one popular theory which suggests Ethier was killed by hunters from the United States. At the time of Ethier's disappearance, the only hunting seasons that would have been open would be for small game and bear, and in the 1990s most bear hunting took place in the spring rather than the fall months. The small game season rarely draws anyone to the community, and big game hunters would be required to stay with a licensed outfitter or lodge.

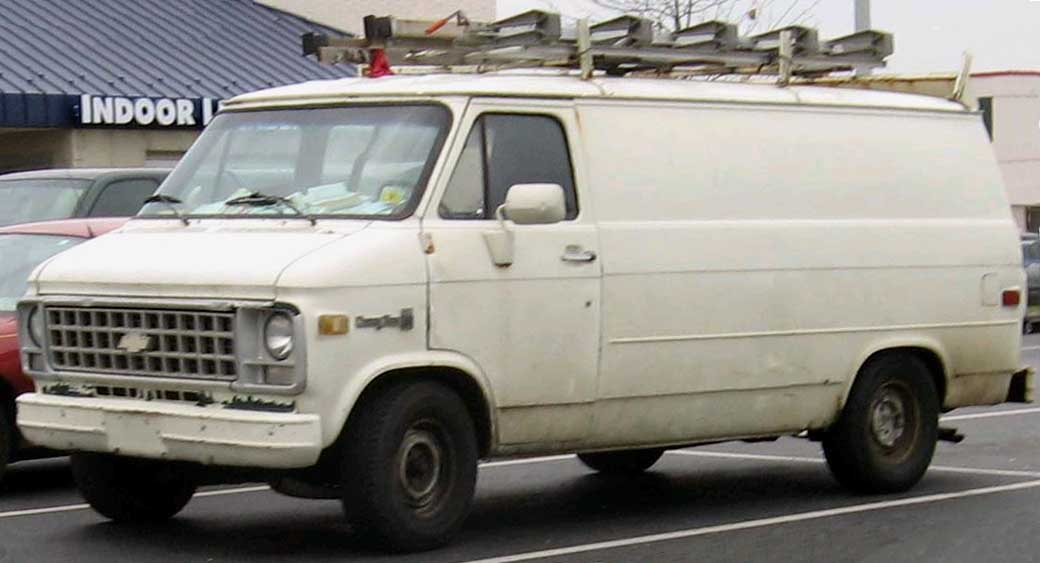
78-82 Chevrolet Van which may resemble the van sighted

Of particular interest to the case is the suspicious vehicle encountered by the two girls who were with Ethier on the day she disappeared. Samya Benchabi, who had briefly walked with the group on the afternoon of 28 September 1996, left them and returned home after sunset, either at around 19:00 or 22:00. While walking back to her house with her large dog, a white delivery van pulled over to ask her for directions to a street in New Liskeard, though later Benchabi could not remember which street they'd asked about. The van was large and rusted, with a sliding side door and no windows. The location where they pulled over was only about 100 metres from the Ethier residence. The driver and his passenger were reported as being men in their 30s or 40s, both unkempt and at least one of them wearing just an undershirt. She found the conversation uncomfortable, and when her dog began to bark aggressively at the vehicle, Benchabi declined to give them any information and the men drove off. The van was also spotted that night by a video store employee. The employee, who was the sister of one of the male friends Ethier was with, had seen Melanie earlier that day and had even paid for the movie the group rented. One man, either the driver or his passenger, entered the rental store at around 22:30 and loitered around, ignoring the clerk's offer to help him find what he was looking for, and left without ever saying a word. He was wearing blue work pants which looked unwashed and discoloured, a grungy white shirt which had been extensively yellowed, and work boots. He was described as being of an average build with dirty blond hair, in his mid-40s, standing roughly 5'8"-5'9". She described the van as being a "beat up" white utility van with no signage, and was unable to inconspicuously take down the license plate number because it was parked in a dark spot. After the man left, the clerk, who would normally walk home but felt threatened by the stranger's odd behaviour, called her father to pick her up when the store closed at 23:00. Police did not question the clerk until 2020.

==== Assault by serial killer ====
At the time of Ethier's disappearance in 1996, as many as three known serial predators were active in the Temiskaming area.

Richard Bouillon was a convicted sexual predator who murdered his 16-year-old neighbour Julie Surprenant in Terrebonne, Quebec on 15 November 1999.

Paul Alan Hachey was a repeat violent offender who was ultimately convicted of three sexual assaults which took place in Edmonton and two murders which took place in Ontario. Hachey murdered 46-year-old Larry Arnold on 14 October 1994 and hid Arnold's body in a ravine in Rosedale, Toronto, where it remained hidden until 19 November nearly five weeks later; and 20-year-old Sarah Whitehead on 7 August 1997 while she was walking home from the mall along a footpath in North Bay. Hachey was arrested in Calgary in December 1997 for another sexual assault. Police in Hachey's hometown of Sturgeon Falls, Ontario made the connection between him and the murder of Sarah Whitehead using DNA retrieved from a cigarette butt at the crime scene in Calgary to tie Hachey to the crime as well as the assaults in Edmonton; he also confessed to the murder of Larry Arnold while in police custody. Although he was active in the area, his modus operandi (or "MO") does not match the details of the Ethier disappearance and the OPP do not consider him a suspect.

Michael Wayne McGray was a serial killer who was active and transient at the time of Ethier's disappearance. Between 1985 and 1998, McGray killed at least six girls between the ages of 7 and 18 years old, and has since claimed to have been responsible for eleven more which have yet to be linked to him. McGray's confirmed crimes took place in Dartmouth, Moncton, Montreal, Saint John, and Weymouth; but he claims that his yet-undiscovered crimes occurred in more distant locales including Calgary, Seattle, and Vancouver. McGray was arrested on 1 March 1998.

== Public reaction ==
=== Initial reaction ===
The New Liskeard community helped search for Melanie and support the Ethier family. A special prayer service was held at New Liskeard's Church of St. John the Evangelist on 2 October 1996, three days after Melanie disappeared; and a second was held shortly afterwards at Paroisse Sainte-Croix. Parents whose children were enrolled in the Garderie Richelieu, the daycare where both Celine and Melanie Ethier worked, began organizing a trust fund for the Ethier family after the disappearance. Another vigil was held on 9 December, and was attended by roughly sixty people. The tree, located behind the Holy Cross Parish church, was adorned with yellow ribbons and photos of Melanie in order to keep the public aware of her case, and throughout the holiday season other trees were similarly decorated with gold ribbons. Celine Ethier later stated:

My house felt like a big funeral for the first two weeks because I had people dropping off food, flowers, gifts. I had a lot of contact with the police, they really kept me up-to-date. I did mini-searches myself with friends.

The principals of New Liskeard Public School, Haileybury Public School, and École secondaire catholique Sainte-Michel reported in October 1996 that the event incited much discussion about personal safety among the students, but that the public awareness of Ethier's disappearance did not increase the number of parents who dropped off and picked up their children from school.

The Temiskaming Speaker named the disappearance of Melanie Ethier as their News Story of the Year for 1996, and one article referred to the case as the "story of the decade".

=== Continued interest ===
The Canadian Centre for Child Protection has provided support to the Ethier family for over 20 years. The Missing Children Society of Canada has tried to bring attention to the case, citing Melanie Ethier as a case of a missing child who had yet to be located and may still be living after the victims of serial child abductor Ariel Castro were found alive in May 2013.

In 2016, the City of Temiskaming Shores Public Works Committee turned down a proposal to install a bronze memorial dedicated to Melanie Ethier on the Armstrong Street bridge.

Approximately 300 masked marchers attended a "Walk for Awareness: Bring Melanie Ethier Home" event on 7 November 2020, raising awareness for the case and advocating for better child welfare.

=== Social media ===
Celine Ethier created a Facebook page entitled "Let's Work Together to Find Melanie Ethier" on 11 August 2009 to raise awareness for her daughter's case. Ethier has concentrated her search for Melanie online, telling reporters in 2015 that "I feel that Facebook, because it is so known to everybody, it's going to give Melanie more exposure" and "I am going to get the tip that I need to be able to find her". As her mother never directly revealed any details about the investigation to her, Jessie Ethier learned much of what she knows about the case from interactions on the Facebook page.

In January 2020, the Ontario Provincial Police released a series of videos on historical and unsolved criminal cases including the disappearance of Melanie Ethier, interviewing her mother Celine Ethier as well as Detective Sergeant Lisa Laxton and Detective Inspector Rob Matthews from the OPP.

Interest in the case increased in September 2020 when Michael Jolicoeur, a medium, began posting vlogs to his YouTube channel claiming to have been contacted by the spirit of Melanie Ethier.

=== Criticism of police ===
Editorials by staff at the Temiskaming Speaker newspaper criticized law enforcement and the government of Canada for not expanding the National DNA Data Bank of Canada to include missing persons and unidentified remains, which may have stymied investigations like the Ethier case. Celine Ethier also criticized the federal government for voting down legislation which would expand the DNA database. In 2019, another editorial in the paper praised the passage of the Missing Persons Act on 1 July 2019.

OPP Detective Constable Bill Deverell has refuted criticism that the police overlooked tips and didn't consider every possible lead in the investigation.

== In media ==
=== Television ===
- Celine Ethier appeared on The Camilla Scott Show in January 1998 to raise awareness for her daughter's case.
- A made-for-television documentary about the Melanie Ethier disappearance was aired by Studio 2 on TVOntario in October 1998.
- Melanie Ethier's disappearance was profiled on the Court TV Canada true crime television show Crime Files: Cold Case Specials in an episode which aired 13 December 2006.
- Chasing Ghosts, a special report on the television program W5, covered the Ethier case on 20 November 2010, renewing calls for a missing persons index to be added to Canada's National DNA Databank.

=== Other ===
- "The Invisible Man", a poem by New Liskeard writer Joyce Weatherbie about child abduction, was inspired by the disappearance of Melanie Ethier and published in a 1998 anthology.
- "The Missing Women Project", a series of portraits by Toronto artist Ilene Sova depicting women and girls who went missing in Ontario between 1970 and 2000. The series of thirty large-format oil paintings was first showcased to the public in Toronto on 8 March 2013 and then Sudbury as part of the Mayworks Festival in May 2013. Melanie Ethier was one of the eighteen people portrayed in the installation.
- Shedding Light, a podcast focused on investigating unsolved cases in Canada, launched in July 2020 with a five-episode season focused on the disappearance of Melanie Ethier. According to detectives involved in the investigation, new tips were reported following the podcast's release.
- The Next Call, a podcast by David Ridgen and the Canadian Broadcasting Corporation, has five episodes centered on “The case of Melanie Ethier” wherein the host investigates the case through phone calls with witnesses, family, and other locals who may have information about Ethier's disappearance. At least one credible lead was called in as a result of the podcast.

== See also ==
- List of people who disappeared mysteriously (2000–present)
