= Bettez =

Bettez is a surname. Notable people with the surname include:

- Ann-Sophie Bettez (born 1987), Canadian ice hockey forward
- Arthur Bettez (1871-1931), Canadian politician
- Jonathan Bettez, suspect in the 2007 disappearance of Cédrika Provenchez
