= Disappearance of Tammy Lamondin-Gagnon =

Disappeared woman from Ontario, Canada

Tammy Lynn Lamondin-Gagnon
- Born: 4 February 1979
- Disappeared: c. 29 May 1999 (age 20); Newmarket, Ontario, Canada
- Status: Missing for 27 years, 5 months and 11 days
- Mother: Jacqueline Gagnon

Tammy Lynn Lamondin-Gagnon (born 4 February 1979) was an Ojibwe woman who disappeared in Newmarket, Ontario in 1999. As of 2026, Lamondin-Gagnon's whereabouts and the circumstances of her disappearance remain unknown.

== Background ==
Tammy Lynn Lamondin-Gagnon was born on 4 February 1979. She was the daughter of Jacqueline Gagnon, and had one older brother, Darren Gagnon. All three were members of the Beausoleil First Nation from Christian Island. Lamondin's family moved from Parry Sound to Aurora when she was a toddler, and remained there for 16 years before moving to Newmarket in 1998.

Lamondin has been described as being "industrious", and had interests in yoga, poetry, and numerology. In May 1999, she was taking driving lessons and working two jobs, but was interested in becoming a marine biologist. She was left-handed.

At the time of her disappearance, Lamondin was 20 years old, stood 5'6"–5'8" tall, and weighed roughly 105–110 lbs. Lamondin had blue eyes, a light skin complexion, and brown hair which was being worn in a short wavy style the night she went missing. She had a dolphin tattoo above her right ankle and her navel was pierced with a ring. Both of her ears were pierced, with one having three piercing holes.

== Disappearance ==
Locations
1 Millard Street in Stouffville
2 Fairy Lake Park

Tammy Lamondin left home on the evening of Friday, 28 May 1999 to meet with friends. She spent some time at a bar on Main Street in Newmarket before moving on to a local night club with three acquaintances, including 27-year-old Pol Classen. Lamondin and Classen then attended a party at a house on Millard Street in Stouffville which belonged to Classen's sister. After the party, Classen drove her to Fairy Lake Park in Newmarket, a popular meeting place for local youth. According to Classen, he dropped Lamondin off at Fairy Lake around 02:00 on the morning of Saturday, 29 May 1999; this was the last time anyone saw her alive.

When she was last sighted, Lamondin was wearing blue denim overalls with blue-and-red-striped straps, a yellow tank top, and Birkenstock sandals with three straps and flowers painted on the side. She often wore silver jewelry, and may have been wearing a black string medallion necklace.

== Investigation ==
York Regional Police carried out the initial stages of the search for Tammy Lamondin. Police divers searched Fairy Lake but recovered no remains or evidence connected to the case. In July, police confirmed a behavioural psychologist was assisting in the investigation. Six weeks after Lamondin was reported missing, her mother, Jacqueline Gagnon, personally joined the search on 8 July. Brian King, a private investigator, was hired by Gagnon to help the search effort and a trust fund was set up to help cover expenses. Friends and other members of the Lamondin-Gagnon family also participated in searches which focused on the region's many rural roads, and local residents - including farmers - in and around Newmarket and Uxbridge were asked to thoroughly search their properties for possible evidence. In a statement to The Newmarket Era-Banner in August 1999, Jacqueline Gagnon told the media:

Tammy is somewhere. We look. We scan the ditches. We check, we double check, and then we check again.

In early July, police established a crime scene at the house where Lamondin and Classen had attended a party the night of her disappearance, using 25 officers on foot, in police cruisers, on mountain bikes, and in helicopters to survey the Stouffville area for evidence. In early August, police followed up on two possible leads about possible burial sites where Lamondin's body was alleged to have been hidden, but found one of the sites was simply a pile of dirt and the other contained a buried deer. Another search was conducted around Stouffville and northern Uxbridge on 9 August, but turned up nothing. Police claimed search efforts were hurt by a heavy workload, as the homicide unit was concurrently investigating two murders in nearby Markham: 44-year-old Maria Wong, murdered on 11 February; and 16-year-old Sandy Ebrahim, murdered on 27 June. In a statement in August 1999, York Region Police Deputy Chief Armand LeBarge told the media he and other investigators would take detours on rural roads to continue to search for Lamondin while off-duty.

Although the first year of the search involved more than 100 participants including police and volunteers, interest waned and by the second year only Gagnon and her son, Darren, Lamondin's brother, were actively investigating her disappearance.

In the initial stages of the investigation, Lamondin's family had disclosed to police that she was First Nations but did not believe doing so could impact the way authorities would handle the case. In a 2015 interview, Lamondin's mother expressed concerns that this detail may have affected investigators' approach, and suggested the results of the National Inquiry into Missing and Murdered Indigenous Women and Girls could lead to better outcomes in the cases of other missing Indigenous women.

A memorial service was held for Lamondin on 8 October 2003, more than four years after her disappearance, and her family filed to have a death certificate issued in her name in 2015 after 16 years without any communication. As of 2021, Lamondin's disappearance is being treated as a cold case and investigated by a homicide unit within the York Regional Police. Police have access to her dental records, which may be used to identify her remains should they be found.

== Theories ==
As the last person to see Tammy Lamondin alive, suspicions immediately fell on Pol Classen. Classen was a 27-year-old man from nearby Goodwood. In the early days of the investigation, police questioned Classen twice but avoided calling him a suspect, although they told the media no one else was being investigated. The investigation focused on what Classen had done between when he allegedly dropped Lamondin off at Fairy Lake Park at 02:00 and when he used his bank card in Stouffville at 06:43, nearly five hours later that morning. Classen had been staying at his sister's home at the time of the disappearance, the same house where he and Lamondin had attended a party immediately before she went missing. The night after Lamondin disappeared, Classen rented a carpet cleaner from a local A&P supermarket. According to police, Classen also returned to the bar where he and Lamondin had been on the night of her disappearance and told the manager he had spotted her alive on Main Street since the disappearance. On 7 June 1999, just over a week after Lamondin's disappearance and after being asked to submit to police questioning a third time, Classen died by suicide at his family's business in Vandorf. His sister's home was declared a crime scene, and in early July evidence recovered from the house triggered a thorough police search of the surrounding area.

Locations
1 Last known location of Melanie Ethier.

On the CBC true crime podcast The Next Call, host David Ridgen speculated that Denis Léveillé, a suspect in the unsolved 1996 disappearance of Melanie Ethier with a history of sexually abusing teenage girls, may have been responsible for other missing person cases in Ontario. Ridgen included Lamondin in a list of girls and young women who disappeared in Ontario at the time Léveillé was active.

== In media ==
In 2016, three journalism students at Carleton University produced a 5-minute documentary about Lamondin's case, Tammy's Story, which was broadcast four times by TVO on 5 and 7 November 2016 before later being uploaded online. Interviewed on the program were Jacqueline Gagnon, Lamondin's mother; Jo-Ann Boulding, lawyer and three-time NDP candidate for Parry Sound-Muskoka; and Dawn Lavell-Harvard, President of the Native Women's Association of Canada. The documentary was a semi-finalist in TVO's 2016 Short Doc Contest.

Lamondin's case is one of three featured as part of a recurring memorial exhibit, 'Shades of Our Sisters', which tells the stories of missing and murdered Indigenous women, transgender, and two-spirit people from the perspective of their families. Although normally the memorials are put on display for in-person crowds, the organization responsible for doing so collaborated with York University to present the exhibit online for the duration of the COVID-19 pandemic. Also represented by the memorial are Patricia Carpenter and Sonya baa Nadine Mae Cywink.

== See also ==
- List of people who disappeared mysteriously (2000–present)
