= Disappearance of Pamela Holopainen =

Disappeared woman from Ontario, Canada

Pamela Holopainen
- Born: Pamela Jayne Holopainen; 1 August 1981
- Disappeared: 14 December 2003 (aged 22); Timmins, Ontario, Canada
- Status: Missing for 22 years, 9 months and 20 days

Pamela Jayne Holopainen (born 1 August 1981) was a young Inuk woman who disappeared in Timmins, Ontario, in 2003. As of 2026, her whereabouts and the circumstances of her disappearance remain unknown.

== Background ==
Pamela Jayne Holopainen was born in Hamilton on 1 August 1981. Her mother, Holly Kowtook, was an Inuk woman who had been sent to a boarding school in Timmins, Ontario. Holly was born and raised in Moose Factory, Ontario, however her family is originally from Sanikiluaq. Her father, Patrick Holopainen, was also raised and spent most of his life in the Timmins area. Holopainen was Kowtook's second daughter and the younger sister to Vanessa Brousseau, (aka Resilient inuk) about three years her senior. In 1982, the family moved to South Porcupine, a neighbourhood of Timmins where Holopainen's father lived. Kowtook was very active in the local Indigenous community, and served for a time as President of the Timmins Native Friendship Centre, often leaving Holopainen in the care of her older sister.

At the time of her disappearance Holopainen was 22 years old, stood 5'2" (158 cm) tall, weighed 126 lbs (57 kg), and had brown hair and blue eyes. She has been described as having a medium build. Holopainen had two tattoos on her left hand, one of a web pattern between her thumb and index finger; and another of the initials "DI".

== Disappearance ==
Locations
1 Her home, 77 Fourth Avenue and last known location.

On Saturday, 13 December 2003, Pamela Holopainen asked her sister, Vanessa Brousseau, to babysit her two young sons so that she and her common-law spouse, Chris Manchester, could attend a friend's house party. As Brousseau already had plans for the evening, she then asked Manchester's sister to watch the children. At around 2:00 am the next morning, Holopainen and Manchester had a public argument witnessed by other guests at the party. Holopainen was last seen leaving the house party followed closely by Manchester in the early morning hours of Sunday, 14 December 2003. According to witnesses, she had intended to walk home to her residence at 77 Fourth Avenue in the Schumacher neighbourhood.

At this time she was wearing a purple Columbia winter jacket, a silver necklace with a silver eagle pendant, and as many as four rings.

== Investigation ==
=== Initial search ===
In what her family has described as uncharacteristic behaviour, Pamela Holopainen was not in touch with her family after the night of the house party. Holopainen's sister, Vanessa Brousseau, attempted to contact her the day after the party but was only able to leave a voicemail, but never received a response. Brousseau also tried to drop off Christmas presents for Holopainen's sons on 16 December, but nobody answered the door. In interviews, Brousseau has suggested that they were usually in contact three to four times per day, and had a very close relationship which made the sudden lack of communication concerning. After they received no call from her on Christmas, Brousseau called her sister's landlord on Boxing Day to ask if he knew where she was, but he also was unaware and offered to keep an eye out in case anybody came by the apartment. As more days went by without contact, her family assumed Holopainen, Manchester, and their children were visiting Manchester's family out of town.

Holopainen was first reported as missing on 31 December. Her sister and mother had been approached by Manchester's sister at the local bingo hall, who claimed Holopainen had ended their relationship and left their children in his care. Out of concern the family attempted to report her missing but were told to wait a few more days as officers believed she could be out drinking.

Without support from police, family members began reaching out to friends and other possible contacts in the area. Manchester alleged that both of them had returned to her apartment on the night she disappeared but she had left by the time he woke up and had not been in touch since. According to Brousseau, Holopainen's family stopped speaking with him around this time as they suspected he was not being forthcoming with details about her disappearance and did not want to participate in putting up missing person posters or going on local news to raise awareness about the case.

Timmins Police issued a missing person notice on 4 January 2004, claiming that Holopainen was believed to have gone to Hamilton but foul play was not suspected. After months with no further communication from investigators, police got in touch with the family (including her sister and mother) and arranged a meeting where they suggested Holopainen was working in Hamilton as a sex worker. During this meeting they presented the family with a nude photograph of Holopainen found by investigators on her home computer.

The Timmins Police requested support from the Ontario Provincial Police in May 2004, and the OPP took over the investigation several months later with OPP Detective Inspector Dave Truax of the Criminal Investigation Branch as the lead on the case. Detectives were unable to locate Holopainen, but during a search of the Timmins area in autumn of that year they found evidence of blood on the walls, floor, and door of her apartment. They also searched a local garbage dump, the Deloro Landfill Site, using excavators and two cadaver dogs on 26–29 October. In the year following the disappearance, police conducted over 100 witness interviews.

=== Later years ===
In the months after Pamela Holopainen's disappearance, her common-law spouse, Chris Manchester, was sued in family court by her mother, Holly Kowtook. Kowtook was granted joint custody of her grandsons, who spent every second weekend at her home until her death on 31 December 2007, aged 45. Holopainen's children were also alternately housed by their father, and at times were taken into foster care provided by the Children's Aid Society. A memorial organized by the Sisters in Spirit campaign was held at the Timmins Native Friendship Centre on the one-year anniversary of Holopainen's disappearance.

On 10 May 2005, police offered a $50,000 reward for information which would lead to the arrest and conviction of the person or people responsible for Holopainen's disappearance. Later that year, Holly Kowtook, Holopainen's mother, told the Timmins Daily Press that police had not investigated her daughter's case as thoroughly as other missing women in the area because of her race.

Following the 2015 federal election which saw a Liberal government form under Prime Minister Justin Trudeau, interest was renewed in setting up a nationwide inquiry into the phenomenon of missing and murdered Indigenous women. Vanessa Brousseau, Holopainen's older sister, publicly criticized police handling of the original investigation and suggested the federal government should contact her and other relatives of the missing before launching the formal inquiry. When the inquiry went ahead in 2017, organizers declined to host Brousseau while they were meeting with families in Toronto, suggesting they could not afford to accommodate her travel or arrange a meeting closer to Timmins. Brousseau also refused to travel to Thunder Bay to attend the hearing there, noting that the area has a high incidence of missing Indigenous women and she did not feel safe traveling in an area where she believed she would be vulnerable to racist violence. Brousseau has attempted to use medicine people and psychics to locate her sister, including medium Theresa Caputo; and joined the social media platform TikTok in July 2020 to advocate for missing and murdered Indigenous women, where her videos have been viewed more than 20 million times.

Responsibility for the investigation was eventually transferred to the Timmins branch of the Ontario Provincial Police. Holopainen's sister has claimed that communication from the police has improved in recent years but suggest that investigators have been reluctant to take accountability for mistakes made by their officers because Holopainen was Indigenous. In a statement submitted to the National Inquiry into Missing and Murdered Indigenous Women and Girls, Brousseau claimed that the most recent OPP detective assigned to investigate the disappearance was taken off the case after the officer was arrested on arson charges, and since then the OPP had not contacted the family in any official capacity for over seven years.

Holopainen was one of eleven Indigenous people in Northeastern Ontario whose disappearances were still listed as 'unsolved' according to an OPP report published in December 2015. In an October 2017 statement, Timmins Police spokesperson Kate Cantin claimed that police review the case on a regular basis but the OPP did not respond to further inquiries made about the case by the CBC.

Photos paying tribute to Holopainen and 1,180 other missing and murdered Indigenous women were used as part of "Mind", an art exhibit by Simcoe-based artist Tracey-Mae Chambers unveiled in 2015. Holopainen's case was one of several missing and murdered Indigenous women featured on a series called "Unresolved", a limited-time segment on the CBC-affiliated radio program Morning North in 2017. On the evening of 14 November 2021 in Timmins, a "tree of hope" was lit with over 2,000 red lights to honour missing and murdered Indigenous women including Holopainen, whose family attended the first of what is intended to become an annual ceremony.

On the CBC true crime podcast The Next Call, host David Ridgen speculated that Denis Léveillé, a suspect in the unsolved 1996 disappearance of Melanie Ethier with a history of sexually abusing teenage girls, may have been responsible for other missing person cases in Ontario. Ridgen included Holopainen in a list of girls and young women who disappeared in Ontario at the time Léveillé was active.

=== Current status ===
As of 2022, Pamela Holopainen's case is still being investigated by the South Porcupine division of the Ontario Provincial Police. The Timmins Police also continue to feature her on their online directory of outstanding missing persons. The OPP is offering a $50,000 reward for leads which result in the arrest and conviction of the person or people responsible for her disappearance.

Investigators and Holopainen's family believe she is deceased and continue to suspect foul play.

== See also ==
- List of people who disappeared mysteriously (2000–present)
