= Disappearance of Cédrika Provencher =

Disappearance and murder of a Canadian girl

Cédrika Provencher
- Born: 29 August 1997; Trois-Rivières, Quebec, Canada
- Disappeared: 31 July 2007 (aged 9); Trois-Rivières, Quebec, Canada
- Died: 31 July 2007 (aged 9)
- Body discovered: 11 December 2015; Saint-Maurice, Quebec, Canada

Cédrika Provencher (29 August 1997— 31 July 2007) was a Canadian girl from Trois-Rivières, Quebec, Canada, who disappeared aged 9 on 31 July 2007. Her disappearance resulted in one of the biggest police searches in Québec's history. She was declared "missing" on 31 July 2007, (but some commentators in the media already believed that she was kidnapped), and "likely abducted" 72 hours later. Despite the offer of a reward, her whereabouts remained unknown for more than eight years.

On 12 December 2015, Québec provincial police (SQ) announced that her remains had been found by hunters in a wooded area not far from Trois-Rivières. No one has been charged in connection to her death.

== Disappearance and search ==
It is believed that Cédrika was asked by a man to help search for a lost dog, and agreed to help. She cycled around the area, knocking on doors and asking residents if they had seen the dog. She was seen emerging from a wooded area with a friend, closely followed by a man. She was then seen on her bike in a local park and on various nearby streets. At 8:30 pm, her bicycle was found leaning against a fire hydrant on the corner of streets Chabanel and Chapais.

On 2 August 2007, 72 hours later, municipal officers suggested that she had been abducted. The Sûreté du Québec (SQ) therefore took over the investigation from the smaller Trois-Rivières police service, as per law. Neither police forces declared the Amber alert. Hundreds of citizens assisted in the search for Cédrika, to no avail. On 13 August, while around 60 investigators were working full-time on the case, a reward of CA$80,000 was offered in exchange of information. It was raised to CA$170,000 in 2009.

Between August 2007 and July 2008, various newspapers published information on various aspects of the search, but no concrete information surfaced to be able to find Cédrika or even to establish whether she was still alive.

== Discovery of remains ==
On 11 December 2015, three hunters stumbled upon a set of human remains in the woods in Saint-Maurice, a small town near Trois-Rivières close to Highway 40, about 15 km (9.3 mi) from the last place Cédrika had been seen. On 12 December, it was confirmed that the remains were Cédrika's. Police had no further information at the time, and said that they would need to carry out further investigations. On 16 December, Radio-Canada revealed that investigators were still looking for a person of interest who had been seen around the area where Cédrika disappeared.

== Investigation ==
Jonathan Bettez has been considered a prime suspect since early on, but has never been indicted due to a complete lack of direct evidence.

=== Suspect in Cédrika's disappearance ===
The case against Bettez, at least as revealed in media, is strictly circumstantial. Around the presumed time and place of the kidnapping on 31 July 2007, someone witnessed a "suspicious" red sedan car with chromed door handles. Since this car was also recorded by a surveillance camera at a nearby gas station, police managed to narrow it down to the 2004 red Acura TSX model, which is assembled with such handles. The news that the police were looking for a "red Acura" quickly spread through media outlets. In summer 2007, 258 vehicles of this model and color were registered in the province. Only six exactly matched the characteristics that were sought and Bettez was the only owner whose alibi could not be corroborated. He met with investigators for the first time on 6 September 2007, and on five more occasions before 24 October. Since then, he has been the object of intense police surveillance, including the use of hidden cameras and wiretapping. On 6 September he initially agreed to let his vehicle be searched, but at that time the car was in a repair shop. Investigators only gained access to the car in December after obtaining a search warrant, but no meaningful forensic evidence was found. In the meantime, the SQ announced through media in November that it was "certain" the infamous Acura rouge car was involved in the kidnapping.

Bettez has always refused to take a polygraph test and, according to crime journalist Claude Poirier, he was at some point planning to flee to Switzerland, a country which has no extradition treaty with Canada. According to court documents filed during pre-hearing and obtained by journalists, he was the object in 2009 of a year-long undercover operation similar to the "Mr. Big technique", in an attempt to elicit confidences concerning Cédrika — to no avail. Even before 2016 Bettez was already rumored to be involved in the case. In 2011, a journalist from the investigative television program J.E. tried to interview Bettez, which he declined on camera. At the time, the segment aired on TVA channel but the suspect was kept unnamed and his face blurred.

=== Arrest and acquittal ===
The fact that Bettez was the main suspect was revealed by journalists on 29 August 2016 after he was arrested and charged with six counts of possessing and distributing child pornography. He was however acquitted on 6 October 2018 by judge Jacques Lacoursière, before the beginning of hearings, as the proof against him was considered to have been obtained illegitimately. This evidence was acquired in December 2015, a day or two after the finding of Cédrika's remains, when investigators involved in the case decided to look into whether Bettez, the sole suspect, could be a user of such pornography. Without any warrant, Facebook gave them 12 IP addresses associated with his account within the previous year or so. They justified their request by claiming a sense of "urgency" inherent to the recent finding of the corpse, and concern that evidence could be destroyed. However, Judge Lacoursière found that there was no urgency and that a proper warrant should have been obtained.

The querying of an international police database then showed that one of the IP addresses, which investigators learned was from Bettez's place of work (a small company owned by Bettez's father, with more than a dozen employees on its network), had been used to view and share illicit content between 2010 and 2011. With this knowledge, police officers chose, instead of asking a judge for a specific search warrant, to only request a "general warrant" from a justice of the peace, which is easier to obtain and was only intended as an "overview browsing" of Bettez's seized goods. The detailed and thus unauthorized inspection of his electronic devices subsequently revealed traces of a number of illegal files that had been deleted.

== See also ==
- Disappearance of Julie Surprenant
- List of solved missing person cases (2000s)
- List of unsolved murders (2000–present)
