= Ale Holopainen =

Finnish politician

Aleksanteri (Ale) Holopainen (24 April 1908, Korpiselkä - 23 June 1974) was a Finnish farmer and politician. He was a member of the Parliament of Finland from 1957 to 1970, representing the Agrarian League (which changed its name to Centre Party in 1965).
