= Danielle Surprenant =

Biographical details
- Born: June 28, 1985 (age 41); Carthage, Illinois
- Education: Indiana State University

Playing career
- 2003–2005: John Wood CC
- 2005–2007: Saint Francis (PA)

Administrative career (AD unless noted)
- 2007–2009: Indiana State (GA)
- 2009–2010: Stony Brook (athletic academic advisor)
- 2010–2017: Quincy (associate AD)
- 2017–2018: Western Illinois (associate AD)
- 2018–2019: Western Illinois (interim AD)
- 2019–2022: Western Illinois

Danielle Elizabeth Surprenant (née Hibbard; born June 28, 1985) is an American college athletics administrator who served as director of athletics for Western Illinois University from 2018 to 2022. She previously served as an associate athletic director at Western Illinois from 2017 to 2018, and at Quincy University from 2010 to 2017. Surprenant attended John Wood Community College for two years, before transferring to Saint Francis University, where she played for the Saint Francis Red Flash women's basketball team. Surprenant was named interim athletic director at Western Illinois University on May 17, 2018 before being named permanent athletic director at Western Illinois on April 17, 2019. Surprenant resigned as athletic director at Western Illinois on March 11, 2022.
