= Ilene Sova =

Canada-based multidisciplinary visual artist

Ilene Sova is a multidisciplinary visual artist, arts educator, curator and community organizer based in Toronto, Canada. She is well known for the Missing Women Project, a series of thirty large-format portraits of missing Ontario women from 1970 to 2000. Sova is the Ada Slaight Chair of Painting and Drawing at OCAD University, Toronto.

== Selected solo and group exhibitions ==
- 2014 - Missing Women Project, Toronto Public Library, Oakwood Village Library and Arts Centre, Toronto
- 2013 - Missing Women Project, Creative Blueprint Gallery, Toronto
- 2013 - Heroinas, Mutuo Centro de Arte, Barcelona, Spain
- 2016 - To Be..., Walnut Contemporary, Toronto
- 2022 - Unknown Relative, John B. Aird Gallery, Toronto
- 2006 - The Blood Continues to Flow, Museum of Contemporary Canadian Art, Toronto

== Education & community activism ==
Sova is the founder of Blank Canvases, an in-school creative arts education programme in Toronto, and was the Artistic Director of Walnut Studios, destroyed by fire in 2018. In 2013 Sova founded the Feminist Art Collective (FAC), a grass-roots, intersectional, feminist, volunteer-led arts organisation. FAC presents feminist conferences, artist residencies and a range of community programming. In her work as an art educator, Sova has enabled interdisciplinary and contemporary art pedagogies through the lens of social justice, to implement strategies of decolonisation and anti-oppression. In 2014 Sova was invited by New Democratic Party Members of Parliament Peggy Nash and Niki Ashton to exhibit the Missing Women Project in Ottawa at the National Women’s Forum on Feminism and the state of women’s rights. Sova is a Board member of Cultural Pluralism in the Arts Movement Ontario(CPAMO) and the Colour Research Society of Canada. In 2018 Sova delivered the Arthur C. Danto Memorial Keynote Lecture at the 76th Annual Meeting of the American Society for Aesthetics (ASA) on the Missing Women Project.

== Awards and prizes ==
- 2021 - Excellence in Early Stage Research, Scholarship & Creative Activity Award, OCAD University, Toronto
- 2020 - Emerging Leaders in the Americas Faculty Mobility Grant, Government of Canada
