= Disappearance of Julie Surprenant =

1999 missing child case in Quebec, Canada

Julie Surprenant
- Born: March 31, 1983; Quebec
- Disappeared: c. November 16, 1999 (aged 16) at a bus stop about 50 meters from her home north of Montreal
- Status: Missing for 26 years, 10 months and 19 days
- Height: 5 ft 2 in (1.57 m)
- Parent(s): Michel Surprenant; Francine Desautels

Julie Surprenant (born March 31, 1983) is a missing Canadian girl who disappeared in Terrebonne, Quebec around November 16, 1999 at the age of 16. Her family's neighbor, Richard Bouillon, reportedly made a deathbed confession regarding her murder, though her remains have yet to be found and her fate remains unknown.

== Background ==
Prior to her disappearance, Surprenant was a member of her school's improv-comedy troupe and worked as a gift wrapper for the holidays at the Galleries Terrebonne shopping center. She resided with her father, who had recently separated from her mother and moved into the neighborhood. Allegedly, he asked the landlord whether the neighborhood was considered safe.

== Disappearance ==
Locations
1 Last known location

After school, on the evening of Tuesday, November 16, 1999, Surprenant informed her father she would be spending a majority of her evening at the youth community center near the corner of Hauteville and Côte Boisée streets, as was common for her. The center was located next to the bus stop for the line she regularly took home or to work.

Surprenant departed from the youth center at 8:30 PM with a friend prior to boarding the line to her house. Her friend boarded off at the shopping center stop, noticing Surprenant sitting at the front next to the driver. The bus driver recalled chatting with her for the remainder of the bus ride, noticing a man standing in the bus shelter at the stop. Upon asking him whether he wanted to board, the man replied he did not.

At the time of her disappearance, Surprenant was wearing a floral skirt with a blue petticoat, navy blue socks over black tights, a blue scarf with a fish pattern, a green wool jacket and a dark brown leather coat. She was also carrying a black canvas backpack on which she had drawn a peace symbol.

Upon awaking the following morning, Surprenant's father realized she had still not arrived home. He proceeded to check their answering machine, phone her high school, and call her boyfriend to inquire about her whereabouts.

== Investigation and aftermath ==
The nearby church

The police were officially notified of Surprenant's disappearance at 5:45 PM on November 17, the following day. Initially, her case was considered an abduction. Upon learning of the man at the bus shelter, they attempted to determine his identity, though were ultimately unsuccessful in doing so, resulting in Surprenant's disappearance becoming a cold case.

The family's neighbour, Richard Bouillon, a convicted sexual predator, became a prime suspect. Initially, he insisted he was not responsible. In 2001, when confronted by a journalist regarding microscopic traces of blood found in his apartment during a police search, he claimed an old roommate was responsible and left hurriedly, slamming his car door on the journalist's arm in the process.

In 2004, Michael Surprenant established the AFPAD, an association dedicated to families of missing or murdered people to aid in the investigations of his daughter's disappearance as well as those of others.

In 2011, it was revealed that Bouillon had made a deathbed confession to two hospital employees in Laval in 2006, admitting that he had murdered Surprenant after having previously proclaimed his innocence. He claimed he had killed her, stuffed her body into a sports bag with some bricks, and thrown it into the Rivière des Mille Îles across the way from a church in Terrebonne, having also considered leaving it on the doorstep on the church. The coroner's report, released in 2012, concluded that Bouillon likely raped and killed her. Bouillon was never charged as the authorities had insufficient evidence to do so.

In 2014, Surprenant's family and friends created a monument in her memory. Despite a search of the river Bouillon claimed he dumped Surprenant in completed in September 2011, her remains have yet to be found.

== See also ==
- Disappearance of Cédrika Provencher: Another Canadian girl who disappeared in Quebec in 2007 and was discovered deceased in 2015.
- List of people who disappeared mysteriously (1990s)
