= List of songs recorded by Acid Bath =

Wikimedia list article

Acid Bath is a sludge metal band, releasing two albums and a number of demo tapes.

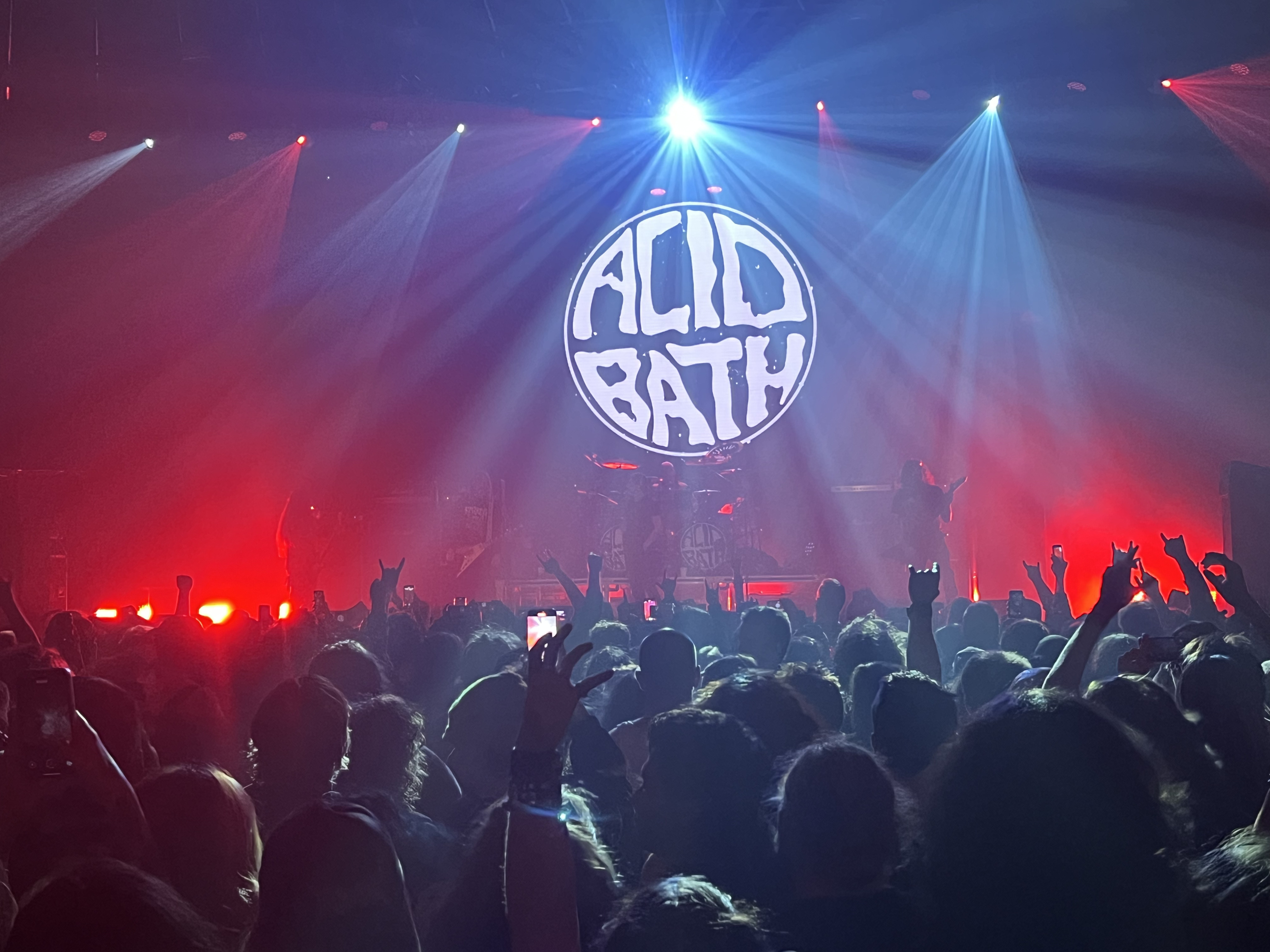
An Acid Bath reunion show at the REBEL in Toronto in October 2025.

This is a comprehensive list of all songs recorded by them

== Songs ==
Title	Release	Year	Ref.	Notes
"The Beautiful Downgrade"	Paegan Terrorism Tactics	1996		Often mislabeled as "Ode of the Paegan"
"Black Sabbath"		2026		Only performed live
"Bleed Me An Ocean"	Paegan Terrorism Tactics	1996		
"The Blue"	When The Kite String Pops	1994		Known in early demos as "U"
"The Bones of Baby Dolls"	When the Kite String Pops	1994		
"Cassie Eats Cockroaches"	When the Kite String Pops	1994		Samples Blue Velvet and A Clockwork Orange
"Cheap Vodka"	When the Kite String Pops	1994		
"Dead Girl"	Paegan Terrorism Tactics	1996		
"Dope Fiend"	When the Kite String Pops	1994		
"Diäb Soulé"	Paegan Terrorism Tactics	1996		
"Dr. Seuss is Dead"	When the Kite String Pops	1994		
"Finger Paintings of the Insane"	When the Kite String Pops	1994		Originally by Golgotha, the band that would later become Acid Bath
"God Machine"	When the Kite String Pops	1994		Samples The Jerry Springer Show
"Grave Flower"	Paegan Terrorism Tactics	1996		
"In-A-Gadda-Da-Vida"	Screams of the Butterfly	1992		Cover of Iron Butterfly, only ever performed live
"Jezebel"	When the Kite String Pops	1994		
"Locust Spawning"	Paegan Terrorism Tactics	1996		
"Lord of This World	Demo II	1992		Black Sabbath cover
"The Mortician's Flame"	When the Kite String Pops	1994		Originally by Golgotha
"New Corpse"	Paegan Terrorism Tactics	1996		
"New Death Sensation"	Paegan Terrorism Tactics	1996		
"Nothingness"	Double Live Bootleg! DVD	2002		Originally by Golgotha
"Old Skin"	Paegan Terrorism Tactics	1996		
"Paegan Love Song"	Paegan Terrorism Tactics	1996		
"Scream of the Butterfly"	When the Kite String Pops	1994		
"Sick Inside"	Screams of the Butterfly	1992		Only ever performed live
"Thirteen Fingers"	Paegan Terrorism Tactics	1996		
"Toubabo Koomi"	When the Kite String Pops	1994		
"Tranquilized"	When the Kite String Pops	1994		
"Venus Blue"	Paegan Terrorism Tactics	1996		
"Venus Blue w/No Shit"	Radio Edits	1996		
"What Color Is Death?"	When the Kite String Pops	1994		Originally by Golgotha
