= If This Is Hell, Then I'm Lucky =

Studio album by Deadboy & the Elephantmen
- Released: October 14, 2002
- Recorded: 1997
- Length: 50:39
- Labels: Elephantmen Recording Company, Fat Possum, Rotten Records

Deadboy & the Elephantmen chronology
If This Is Hell, Then I'm Lucky (2002)	Song Mechanism (2004)

Professional ratings
Review scores
Source	Rating
AllMusic	3/5 stars

If This Is Hell, Then I'm Lucky is the debut album by Deadboy & the Elephantmen, fronted by Dax Riggs, formerly of Acid Bath and Agents of Oblivion. The album was re-released on February 5, 2008, under Dax Riggs's name only, and again in 2010 by Rotten Records, using the band's proper title. It features Dax Riggs (vocals, guitar), Jason Dupre (guitar), Christopher T. Gautreaux (bass guitar), Jeff LeCompte (drums, percussion), and Kurt Westwood (piano, synths).

== Track listings ==
=== Album ===
1. "Strange Television" (6:14)
2. "Waking Up Insane" (4:30)
3. "Song with No Name" (4:03)
4. "Graves Beyond Windows" (3:51)
5. "Otherworldly Dreamer" (7:50)
6. "Like the Dead Would Laugh" (5:07)
7. "High Monster" (4:42)
8. "Heart of Green" (8:16)
9. "Barefoot in the Dark" (4:20)
10. "Deadboy and the Elephantmen Theme Song" (7:53)

=== Demo ===
1. "Barefoot in the Dark" (3:34)
2. "Waking Up Insane" (4:55)
3. "Strange Television" (5:52)
4. "Heart of Green" (6:37)
5. "Song with No Name" (3:45)
6. "Otherworldly Dreamer" (3:20)
7. "Graves Beyond Windows" (4:29)
8. "Deadboy and the Elephantmen Theme Song" (2:16)
