= Demos: 1993–1996 =

Compilation album by Acid Bath
- Released: December 6, 2005
- Recorded: 1993-1996
- Studios: Signature Sound Studio, Festival Studio
- Genre: Sludge metal
- Length: 60:41
- Label: Rotten

Acid Bath chronology
Paegan Terrorism Tactics (1996)	Demos: 1993–1996 (2005)

Demos: 1993–1996 is a compilation of demos by American sludge metal band Acid Bath. It was released by Rotten Records in December 2005. It consists of nine demos for songs from their debut album, "When The Kite String Pops" and three demos for songs from the follow up and final album, "Paegan Terrorism Tactics".

Despite its title, the album actually doesn't feature every released demo between 1993 and 1996, missing out demos included on "Demo II" and "Screams of the Butterfly".

== Track listing ==
All tracks are written by Acid Bath.

No.	Title	Length
1.	"Dr. Seuss Is Dead"	5:39
2.	"What Color Is Death?"	3:12
3.	"Scream Of The Butterfly"	6:02
4.	"God Machine"	3:59
5.	"The Mortician's Flame"	3:39
6.	"Dope Fiend"	5:05
7.	"Finger Paintings Of The Insane"	5:56
8.	"Jezebel"	4:53
9.	"The Bones Of Baby Dolls"	5:15
10.	"Venus Blue"	4:31
11.	"Bleed Me An Ocean"	6:22
12.	"Graveflower"	6:08
Total length:		60:41

== Credits ==
- Tracks 1–8 recorded and mixed at Signature Sound in Orlando, Florida – January 1993
- Track 9 recorded at Dax's and Norris' house – 1994
- Tracks 10–12 recorded and mixed at Festival Studios in Kenner, LA – Summer of 1996
- All songs written and recorded by Acid Bath
- All songs except track 9 engineered by Keith Falgout
- All songs mastered by Nancy Matter at Moonlight Mastering in Burbank, California
- Front and back cover art by Jared M. Guillot
