= Tess Brunet =

American musician and producer

Tess Brunet (born September 12, 1978) is an American musician and producer, who has recorded and performed under the band names The Black Orchids, Au Ras Au Ras, Animal Electric, Generationals, and Deadboy & the Elephantmen. She began working in the lo-fi genre of underground rock, recording on portable cassette tape machines while living in New York City. Brunet has worked with various artists including Daniel Johnston, Lady Bo of Bo Diddley, Floating Action and Twin Tigers, to name a few. Brunet released her first solo albums under Animal Electric in 2008 and Au Ras Au Ras in 2011 and 2012. Tess currently performs and records with her band The Black Orchids. She has toured extensively in various bands since 2003 playing mostly drums and guitar. Tess owns and operates an independent record shop and DIY record label with her husband in south Louisiana.

== Early life ==
Though she was born in New Orleans, Brunet was adopted at age four and spent most of her childhood in Bayou Cane, Louisiana. She was raised in a Catholic family, though she left Catholicism behind at a young age. Brunet moved to New York City when she was 19 years old, where she met Mel Terpos (a.k.a. The Guitar Doctor) while working at S.I.R. Studios. Mel was the guitar guru for Keith Richards, Pete Townshend, Eric Clapton, and Hall & Oates, among many others. Terpos became her mentor and played a large role in her becoming a drummer and later a guitarist.

== Discography ==
With deadboy & the Elephantmen

- We Are Night Sky (2005, LP on Fat Possum)

With Animal Electric (solo)

- Animal Electric self-titled (2008, EP self-release)

With Generationals

- Trust (2010, EP on Park The Van)

With Tess Brunet / Au Ras Au Ras (solo)

- Au Ras Au Ras self-titled (2011, LP self-release)
- The Great Nothing (2012, LP self-release)

With Sherbert

- 2013 Never Happened (2013, LP self-release)

== Produced ==
- The Great Nothing (2012, LP self-release)
- "Touchless Automatic/Bottoms Of My Feet" (2015, 7" on Lagniappe Records)
