= Julian Primeaux =

American singer-songwriter (born 1984)

- Born: 1984 (age 41–42); Lafayette, Louisiana, U.S.
- Genres: Blues, Southern rock, Roots music
- Occupation: Musician
- Instruments: Guitar, harmonica
- Website: https://www.julianprimeaux.com/

Julian Primeaux is an American singer, songwriter and guitarist known for his work in blues, southern rock and roots music. He has been nominated for a Grammy Award and was inducted into the Louisiana Music Hall of Fame. In 2024, he was featured as a spotlight artist on NPR’s World Cafe.

== Biography ==
=== Early life ===
Julian Primeaux was born in Lafayette, Louisiana. He grew up in southern Louisiana, where he began playing guitar at age eight and was performing regularly by age 12.

Primeaux is a fourth-generation musician. As a child, he was introduced to music by his father and other family members. In the early 2000s, Primeaux became actively involved in the Louisiana music scene, performing in various groups while continuing to develop his skills as a songwriter and guitarist. This period marked the beginning of his professional career and led him to later focus on solo recording and touring.

=== Career ===
Primeaux's debut album was released in 2009 and was titled Flowers From My Bones.

In 2010, Primeaux was the lead guitarist on Dax Riggs second album, Say Goodnight to the World.

Primeaux performed with Drew Landry at the 4th annual Muddy Roots festival in 2013.

In April of 2023, Primeaux played at the French Quarter Festival in New Orleans.

Primeaux has performed with a variety of musicians including Gary Clark Jr., Dr. John, Dick Dale, Rev. Horton Heat, Dax Riggs, Sonny Landreth, Ian Moore, Cold War Kids, Andy Frasco & The U.N., Lazy Lester, Anders Osborne, Lil’ Nathan & The Zydeco Big Timers, and Corey Ledet.

He has released a total of five albums.

== Discography ==
- Flowers From My Bones (2009)
- Rock ’n’ Roll Boy (2011)
- This Guilded, Swaying Heart (2016)
- Songs for the Heart of Sister Flute (2023)
- Spinning Heartache Into Gold (2025)

== Awards and honors ==
- Grammy Award nomination, Best Regional Roots Music Album (2022)
- Louisiana Music Hall of Fame inductee (2024)
