= Radio Edits 1 =

Edits

Remix album by Acid Bath
- Released: September 29, 1994
- Genre: Sludge metal
- Length: 23:17
- Producers: Spike Cassidy, Acid Bath

Acid Bath chronology
When the Kite String Pops (1994)	Edits (1994)	Paegan Terrorism Tactics (1996)

Radio Edits 1, or simply Edits, is a remix album by American sludge metal band Acid Bath, released in September 1994 to radio stations only for promotional purposes. This album was not available to the general public and was an attempt to get the band more exposure. The four songs on this album were the most popular from the band's first full album, When the Kite String Pops, that were remixed and cleaned up to make them suitable for airing on the radio. Three of the tracks are variations of the song, "The Bones of Baby Dolls".

Similarly to how their debut album contained art from serial killer/rapist, John Wayne Gacy, the album artwork was done by another prominent serial killer/rapist, Richard Ramirez, which attracted controversy at the time.

== Track listing ==
All tracks are written by Acid Bath.

No.	Title	Length
1.	"Toubabo Koomi"	4:00
2.	"The Bones Of Baby Dolls"	3:34
3.	"Tranquilized"	3:56
4.	"The Bones Of Baby Dolls"	3:59
5.	"Scream Of The Butterfly"	3:52
6.	"The Bones Of Baby Dolls"	3:56
Total length:		23:17

== Credits ==
- Dax Riggs – vocals
- Mike Sanchez – guitar
- Sammy Duet – guitar, backing vocals
- Audie Pitre – bass, backing vocals
- Jimmy Kyle – drums
- Spike Cassidy – production, mixing, mastering
