= We Sing of Only Blood or Love =

Studio album by Dax Riggs
- Released: August 21, 2007
- Recorded: 2006
- Genre: Blues rock, alternative rock
- Length: 38:00
- Label: Fat Possum
- Producer: Matt Sweeney, Dax Riggs

Dax Riggs chronology
We Sing of Only Blood or Love (2007)	Say Goodnight To The World (2010)

Professional ratings
Review scores
Source	Rating
Allmusic	3.5/5 stars
Pitchfork	5.7/10
Exclaim!	—

We Sing of Only Blood or Love (erroneously titled We Sing Only of Blood or Love on the vinyl format) is the debut solo album by American singer and songwriter Dax Riggs. It was slated to be the next Deadboy and the Elephantmen album before the band's dissolution. Riggs decided to release it under his own name on August 21, 2007. Matt Sweeney provided a combination of guitar, bass, piano, and backing vocals for all of the tracks, as well as producing the record.

We Sing of Only Blood or Love is dominated by dark neo-blues rock songwriting structures and also contains heavy metal, folk music, gothic rock, protopunk, and some experimental material. The album is a continuation of Riggs' musical evolution since fronting the Louisiana sludge metal band Acid Bath in the 1990s. Riggs uses a trained, rich vocal style most frequently sung in a blues-influenced baritone rasp. His lyrics contain various stylistic elements of metaphor and imagery, and touch upon personal and poetic subjects such as death, love, Satan, nocturnal hallucinations, mortality, phantoms, and morbidity.

== Track listing ==
All songs are by Dax Riggs except "Wall of Death", originally by Richard Thompson.

1. Demon Tied to a Chair in My Brain
2. Didn't Know Yet What I'd Know When I Was Bleedin'
3. Night Is the Notion
4. Radiation Blues
5. The Terrors of Nightlife
6. A Spinning Song
7. Truth in the Dark
8. Ouroboros
9. Living is Suicide
10. Forgot I Was Alive
11. Ghost Movement
12. Dog-Headed Whore
13. The Wall of Death
14. Scarlett of Heaven nor Hell
15. Dethbryte
16. Dream or Be Dead (Vinyl only)

== Credits ==
The album features, along with Dax Riggs, members of the last incarnation of Deadboy and the Elephantmen: Alex Bergeron (bass), Adam Clement (drums), and Sean Keating (keyboards).

It was produced by Matt Sweeney, who also contributed guitar to some tracks.

The final track, "Dethbryte", was remixed by Andrew W.K.
