= Agents of Oblivion (album) =

Studio album by Agents of Oblivion
- Released: January 25, 2000
- Recorded: 1999
- Genres: Hard rock; doom metal; Southern rock
- Length: 56:43
- Label: Rotten

Agents of Oblivion is the only album by American rock band Agents of Oblivion fronted by Dax Riggs, formerly of Acid Bath.

== Track listing ==
1. "Endsmouth" – 4:24
2. "Slave Riot" – 3:21
3. "A Song That Crawls" – 4:10
4. "Dead Girl" – 6:25 [Acid Bath cover]
5. "Phantom Green" – 5:06
6. "The Hangman's Daughter" – 4:34
7. "Ladybug" – 4:33
8. "Ash of the Mind" – 3:52
9. "Wither" – 4:18
10. "Paroled in '54" – 5:04
11. "Anthem (For This Haunted City)" – 3:40
12. "Cosmic Dancer" – 5:34 [T. Rex cover]
13. "Big Black Backwards" – 6:42

== Personnel ==
- Dax Riggs – vocals, guitar
- Mike Sanchez – guitar
- Danny Barnett – guitar
- Alex Bergeron – bass
- Chuck Pitre – keyboards
- Jeff McCarty – drums

The album's artwork, including the cover and disc art, was lifted from Mike Mignola's Hellboy comic book series.

== Additional notes ==
- "Endsmouth" is a tribute to the Oni Press comic Neil Gaiman's Only the End of the World Again, which references the Cthulhu Mythos.
- The ending from "Phantom Green" is from Tim Burton's film Ed Wood (1994). It is not the actual clip from Bride of the Monster.
- The track "Dead Girl" is an electric guitar arrangement and cover of an acoustic track from Acid Bath's Paegan Terrorism Tactics.
- "Cosmic Dancer" is a T. Rex cover.
- "Big Black Backwards" and "Slave Riot" feature clips from the movie Gummo.
