= List of violent incidents at the Cecil Hotel =

Numerous violent incidents, some resulting in death, have occurred at the Cecil Hotel in Los Angeles. (Note: Besides direct deaths and violence, at least two serial killers, Richard Ramirez and Jack Unterweger, have stayed at the hotel, as well as murder victim Elizabeth Short (better known as "the Black Dahlia") .) Originally opened as a middle-class hotel on December 20, 1924, it eventually became a budget hotel, hostel, and rooming house. Its reputation is due to at least 16 sudden or unexplained deaths that have occurred in or around the hotel.

In 2011, the hotel's name was changed to Stay on Main in an effort to distance the establishment from its past.

== Timeline of incidents ==
Date	Accused	Accused age	Victim	Victim(s) Age	Type	Method	Details
January 22, 1927			Percy Ormond Cook	52	Suicide	Gunshot to the head	Percy Ormond Cook stated in a letter addressed to the press that he was driven to suicide because of his separation from his wife and family. He added that he deliberated for a week before he killed himself.
November 19, 1931			W.K Norton	46	Possible suicide	Ingested poison	Norton was found dead in his room after ingesting poison capsules. A week prior, he had checked into the Cecil under the name "James Willys" from Chicago.
September 1932			Benjamin Dodich	25	Suicide	Gunshot to the head	A maid found Dodich dead from a self-inflicted gunshot wound to the head. He did not leave a suicide note.
July 26, 1934			Sgt. Louis D. Borden	53	Suicide	Slit throat	Borden was found dead in his room at the Cecil. He had slashed his throat with a razor. Borden left several notes, one of which cited poor health as the reason for his suicide.
March 1937			Grace E. Magro	25	Death	Fell from building	Magro fell from a ninth-story window. Her fall was broken by telephone wires which were wrapped around her body. She later died at the now-demolished Georgia Street Receiving Hospital. Police were unable to determine whether Magro's death was the result of an accident or suicide.
January 9, 1938			Roy Thompson	35	Suicide	Fell from building	Thompson jumped to his death from the window of his room after being a resident at the hotel for several weeks. His body was discovered atop a skylight of a next-door building by a hotel employee.
May 1939			Erwin C. Neblett	39	Possible suicide	Ingested poison	Neblett was found dead in his room after ingesting poison.
January 1940			Dorothy Seger	45	Suicide	Ingested poison	Seger, who registered under the pseudonym Evelyn Brent, ingested poison on January 10, 1940, while staying at the Cecil. Beforehand, Seger sent her relatives a note indicating she was going to kill herself. Dorothy died at General Hospital on January 12.
September 1944	Dorothy Jean Purcell	19	Purcell's un-named newborn son	Newborn	Murder (acquitted due to insanity)	Newborn discarded from window	Purcell was sharing a room at the Cecil with her boyfriend when she went into labor. She later testified that she did not want to awaken her boyfriend, so she went to the bathroom where she gave birth. Thinking the baby was dead, she threw him out of the window, and he landed on the roof of an adjacent building. Purcell was charged with murder. Three psychiatrists testified that she was "mentally confused" at the time of the incident. In January 1945, she was found not guilty by reason of insanity.
November 1947			Robert Smith	35	Suicide	Fell from building	Smith died after jumping from one of the Cecil's seventh-floor windows.
October 22, 1954			Helen Gurnee	55	Suicide	Fell from building	Gurnee jumped from the window of her seventh-floor room and landed on top of Cecil's marquee. One week prior, she had registered at the hotel under the name "Margaret Brown".
February 11, 1962			Julia Frances Moore	50	Suicide	Fell from building	Moore jumped from the window of her eighth-floor room and landed in a second-story interior light well. She did not leave a suicide note.
October 12, 1962			Pauline Otton; George Gianinni	27; 65	Suicide	Fell from building	Otton had an argument with her estranged husband, who had left the room prior to her suicide by defenestration. Otton landed on a pedestrian, Gianinni; both died instantly. Police initially thought Otton and Gianinni committed double-suicide. It was later determined that Gianinni had his hands in his pockets at the time of his death which would not have been possible had he jumped.
June 4, 1964	Jacques B. Ehlinger	29	"Pigeon Goldie" Osgood	65	Murder (acquitted)	Stabbed, beaten, and raped	A hotel worker discovered Osgood dead in her room. She had been raped, stabbed, and beaten, and her room was ransacked. Osgood was well known around the area, and had earned her nickname because she fed birds in nearby Pershing Square. Near her body was the Los Angeles Dodgers cap she always wore and a paper sack full of birdseed. Hours after her murder, Ehlinger was seen walking through Pershing Square in bloodstained clothing. He was arrested and charged with Osgood's murder, but was later cleared of the crime. Her murder remains unsolved.
December 20, 1975			Unidentified	Approx. 20-30	Death	Fell from building	The body of a still-unidentified woman was found on the roof of the second floor. She was described as being white, between the ages of 20-30, weighing 118 pounds, and was 5'4 feet tall. She had brown hair, hazel eyes, and multiple scars on both wrists. She had registered at the hotel on December 16 under the unverified name "Alison Lowell," and was staying in room 327 on the hotel's twelfth floor. A Greyhound bus ticket purchased in Bakersfield, California, on December 15 was found in her hotel room, but she did not carry any ID documents. It was not determined whether the death was accident or suicide.
September 1, 1992			Unidentified	Approx. 20-32	Death	Fell from building	The body of a still-unidentified man was found in the alley behind the Cecil. He was described as being black, between the ages of 20-32, weighing about 185-190 pounds, and was 5'8 or 5'9 feet tall. He had black hair, brown eyes, and a scar on the back of his right hand. It was believed that he had likely fallen from the hotel's fifteenth floor. He was wearing a shirt that read "New York, Fun times, Good times." It was not determined whether the death was accident, homicide, or suicide.
February 19, 2013			Elisa Lam	21	Death	Accidental drowning	The naked body of Lam, a Canadian student, was found inside one of the water supply tanks on the hotel roof. She had gone missing almost three weeks earlier, on January 31, 2013. Her decomposing body was discovered by a maintenance worker in one of the rooftop water tanks after guests had complained about low water pressure and water that "tasted funny." Video surveillance footage taken from inside an elevator depicted her erratic behavior, which caused widespread speculation about the cause of her death. She was reported to have had bipolar disorder, for which she was prescribed various medications, which could have contributed to her death as well as her strange behavior in the elevator. The Los Angeles County Coroner's office subsequently ruled the death an accident, with bipolar disorder being a significant contributing factor.
June 12, 2015			Jason Lazar	28	Suicide	Suspected to have fallen from the building	The body of a 28-year-old man was found outside the hotel. A spokesman for the Los Angeles Country Coroner said that the death was believed to be suicide by defenestration.

== See also ==
- Crime Scene: The Vanishing at the Cecil Hotel
- H. H. Holmes
