= Say Goodnight to the World =

Studio album by Dax Riggs
- Released: August 3, 2010
- Genre: Blues rock Alternative rock
- Length: 35:27
- Label: Fat Possum
- Producer: Robbie Lee, Dax Riggs

Dax Riggs chronology
We Sing of Only Blood or Love (2006)	Say Goodnight to the World (2010)

Professional ratings
Review scores
Source	Rating
AllMusic	3.5/5 stars

Say Goodnight to the World is the second solo album by the American singer and songwriter Dax Riggs, released in 2010.

== Critical reception ==
The Austin Chronicle called the album "gritty punk-blues", writing that "[Riggs's] gothic-noir lullabies ... are carried by a voice that still conjures the ghost of Layne Staley." Spin wrote that Say Goodnight to the World "plops Sun Studios into the middle of Transylvania, with Riggs as a pensive, late-night Elvis." The Washington Post wrote that the album "may be [Riggs's] best ... a darkly psychedelic exorcism."

== Track listing ==
All songs were written by Riggs except "Heartbreak Hotel", originally by Mae Boren Axton, Tommy Durden, and Elvis Presley.

1. "Say Goodnight to the World"
2. "I Hear Satan"
3. "You Were Born to Be My Gallows"
4. "Gravedirt on My Blue Suede Shoes"
5. "Like Moonlight"
6. "No One Will Be a Stranger"
7. "Heartbreak Hotel"
8. "Sleeping with the Witch"
9. "Let Me Be Your Cigarette"
10. "See You All in Hell or New Orleans"

== Credits ==
The album was produced by Dax Riggs and Robbie Lee. Riggs is accompanied by the bass guitarist Kevin Fitzsimmons and drummer Charley Siess, who also toured in support of the album with lead guitarist Julian Primeaux.
