= Curious Faces Violet Future =

EP by Twin Tigers
- Released: January 30, 2008
- Genres: Indie rock, alternative
- Label: Old Flame Records
- Producers: Matthew Rain, Aimee Morris

Twin Tigers chronology
| Curious Faces Violet Future (2008) | Grey Waves (2010) |

Curious Faces Violet Future is the first EP by American indie rock band Twin Tigers. It has six songs and is 19 minutes long.

== Track listing ==
| No. | Title | Length |
|---|---|---|
| 1. | "Red Fox Run" | 2:45 |
| 2. | "Watershed" | 3:40 |
| 3. | "Fantastic Plastic" | 3:32 |
| 4. | "Golden Daze" | 2:25 |
| 5. | "If" | 3:46 |
| 6. | "Invisible Zombies" | 3:23 |
