= Dax Riggs =

American rock musician (born 1973)

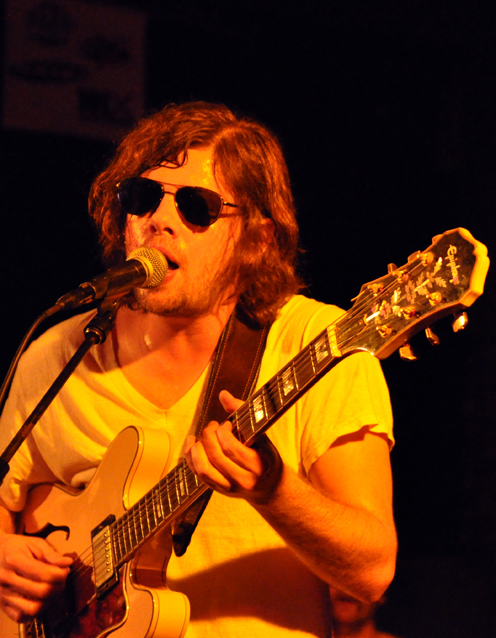
- Riggs in 2011

Background information
- Born: October 15, 1973 (age 53); Evansville, Indiana, U.S.
- Genres: Alternative rock, blues rock, swamp rock, indie rock, sludge metal
- Occupations: Musician, singer-songwriter
- Instruments: Vocals, guitar
- Years active: 1990–present
- Member of: Acid Bath
- Formerly of: Golgotha, Agents of Oblivion, Daisyhead & The Mooncrickets, Deadboy & the Elephantmen

Dax David Riggs (born October 15, 1973) is an American musician, best known for fronting the sludge metal band Acid Bath in the 1990s. He has been a part of many projects since then, including Agents of Oblivion and Deadboy & the Elephantmen. In 2007, he began releasing material under his own name.

== Bands ==
=== Corruption ===
Corruption was Riggs in his teens fronting a thrash metal band that played cover songs, though they never played a real gig.

=== Golgotha ===
Golgotha was the sludge/thrash metal foundation of what would later become Acid Bath. The band released one demo, Wet Dreams of the Insane (1991), under that name before changing it. It featured Riggs as the lead vocalist, Mike Sanchez and Jerry "Boon" Businelli on guitar, Jimmy Kyle on drums, and Chad Pierce on bass.

=== Acid Bath ===
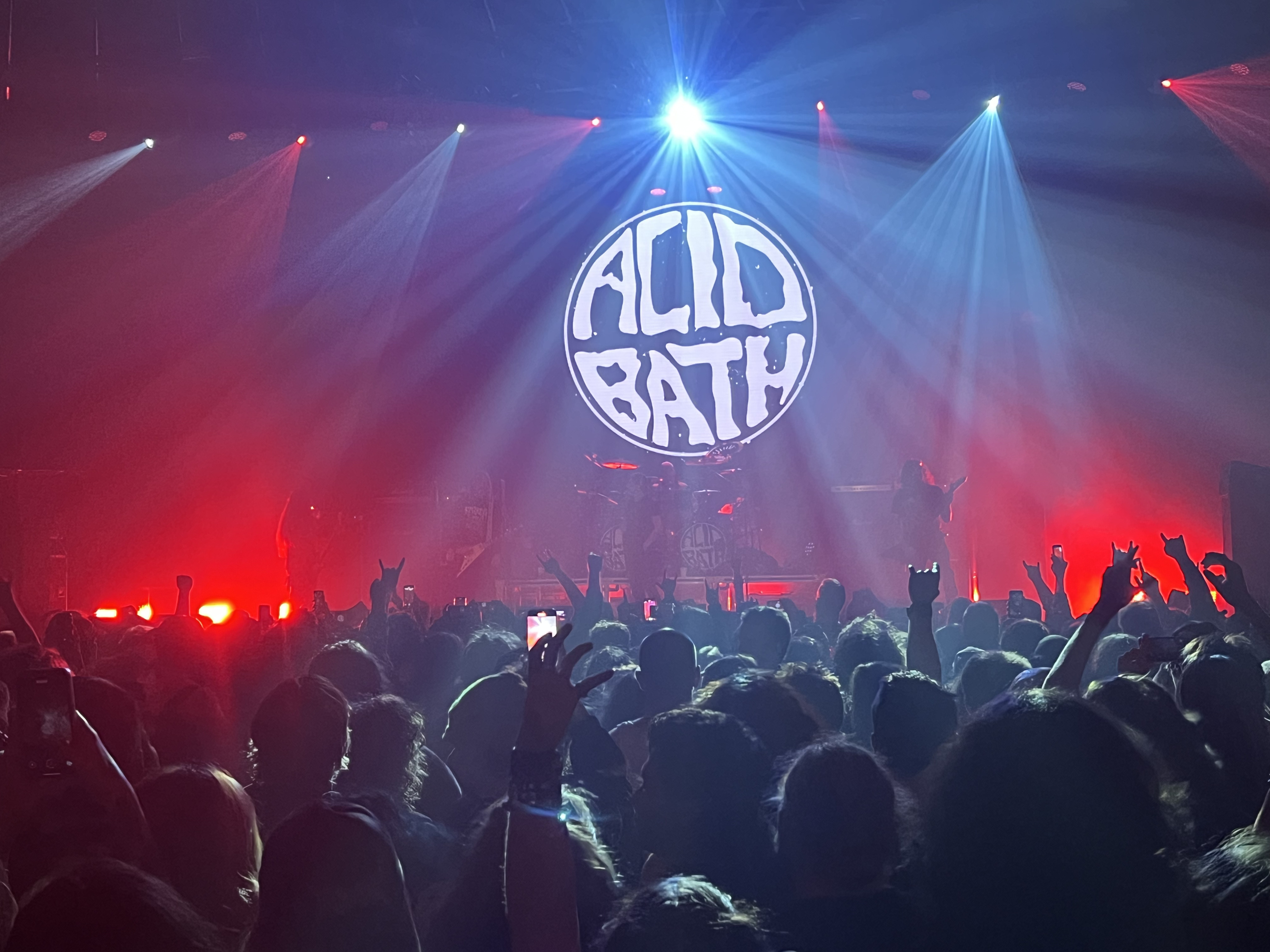
An Acid Bath reunion show at the REBEL in Toronto in October 2025.

Acid Bath is a seminal sludge metal band from southern Louisiana. The band was marked by an unusual blend of sludge metal, swamp blues, doom metal, hardcore punk and psychedelia. Singer Dax Riggs's voice could range from a guttural growl to a Roy Orbison-esque wail in mid-song. In the liner notes for their second album, Paegan Terrorism Tactics, the band thanked the ghost of Roy Orbison (as well as David Bowie) for his help in creating their sound. The band was also noted for Riggs's imaginative and distinctive lyrics which often featured themes of death and drugs.

=== Daisyhead & The Mooncrickets ===
Daisyhead & The Mooncrickets was a project of Riggs between 1995 and 1997. Only two Daisyhead recordings are known to exist: Skeletal Circus Derails, a six-song recording from 1995, and a self-titled 14-track album from 1997, where most of the songs are cut off before they end. They also detail a point in Riggs' career when he struggled for life after Acid Bath, which disbanded following the death of bassist Audie Pitre in 1997.

Toward the end of Daisyhead & The Mooncrickets, Riggs was pushing for a more melodic sound, which materializes in his subsequent bands Agents of Oblivion and Deadboy & the Elephantmen. That sound was first heard on the Daisyhead recordings.

=== Agents of Oblivion ===
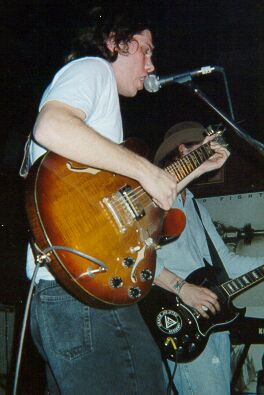
Riggs (foreground) and Mike Sanchez performing live

Agents of Oblivion was the first of Riggs's post-Acid Bath projects to release any official recordings. The band first emerged with a five-song demo, featuring former Acid Bath guitarist Mike Sanchez on lead guitar. The demo included "Big Black Backwards", "Ash of the Mind", and other songs which would later appear on the band's 2000 self-titled debut. The album included the five demo songs in addition to "Riding the Wormhole", a new version of "The Skeletal Circus Derails", and a newer, faster version of Acid Bath's "Dead Girl". The album features a blend of spare, dark ballads interspersed with blues-based heavy metal, although the sound never reverts to the more aggressive stylings of Acid Bath. The band broke up after a short tour in support of the album.

=== Deadboy & the Elephantmen ===
Deadboy & the Elephantmen was Riggs's next band, active from 2000 until 2007. Initially a solo project, it later morphed into a full band before eventually settling on a two-piece lineup of Riggs and drummer Tessie Brunet. The band toured on many festivals with various bands, including Fiery Furnaces, Peaches, Eagles of Death Metal, Wolfmother and Heartless Bastards, and released albums on Fat Possum Records.

=== T-Daks & His White Plastic Soul and Dax Riggs ===
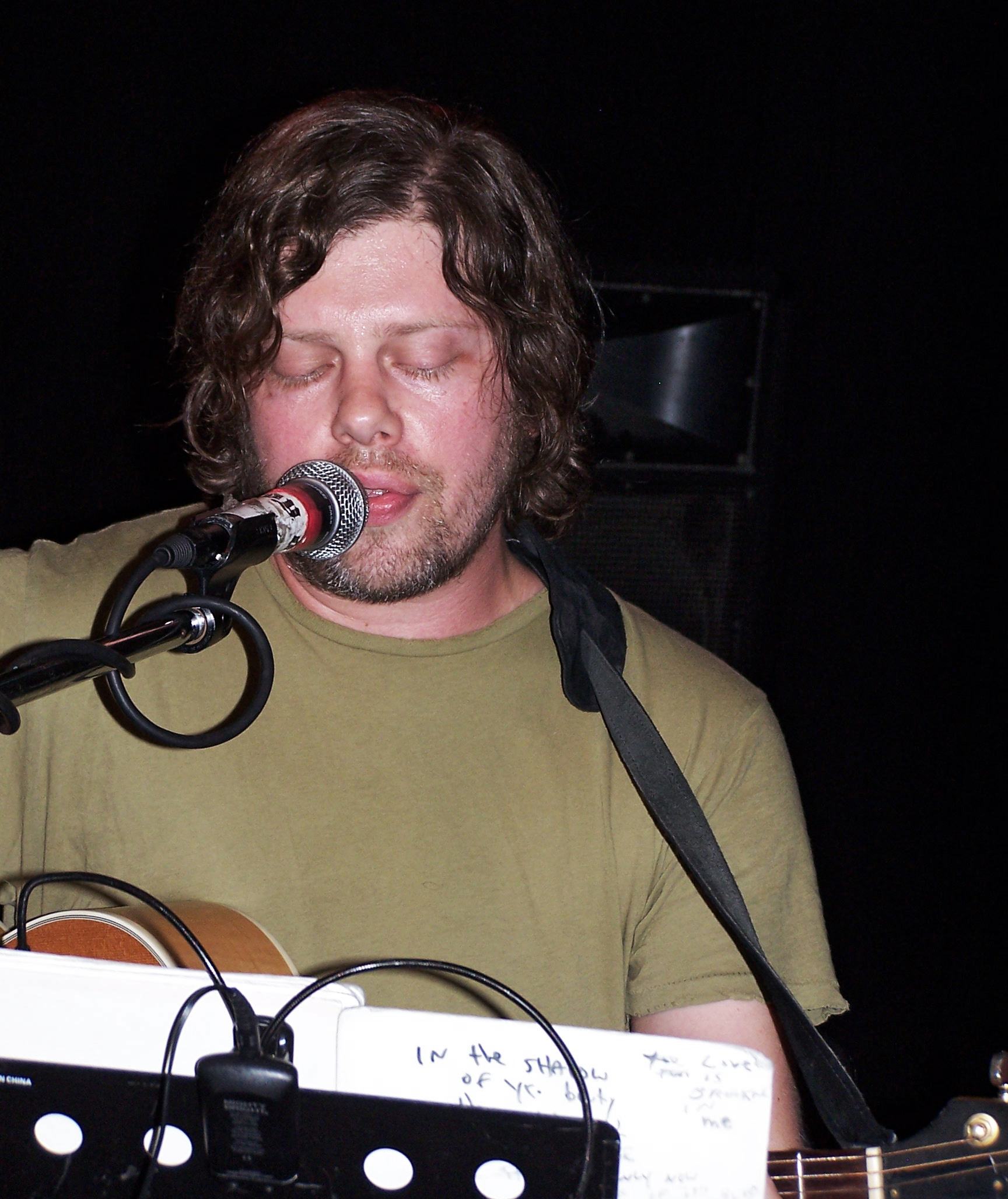
Riggs performing in 2013

Riggs's solo project started out under the name T-Daks & His White Plastic Soul. Riggs performed a handful of live shows under that name, mostly performing acoustic. After the breakup of Deadboy & The Elephantmen in early 2007, he stated that he would release future albums under his own name. His first solo album, We Sing of Only Blood or Love, was released on Fat Possum Records in August 2007. His second album, Say Goodnight to the World, was released on August 3, 2010 (also with Fat Possum Records). A third solo album titled 7 Songs for Spiders was produced in 2024 and released by Fat Possum on 24 January 2025.

=== Acid Bath reunion ===
On October 15, 2024, it was announced Acid Bath would be playing at Sick New World in Las Vegas on April 12, 2025. Along with returning original members (Riggs, Duet, and Sanchez), Zack Simmons (Goatwhore), and Alex Bergeron (ex-Agents of Oblivion) were announced on drums and bass respectively. In September 2025, it was announced that Acid Bath would be supporting System of a Down on their 2026 European Tour, alongside Queens of the Stone Age.

== Discography ==
with Golgotha

• Wet Dreams Of The Insane (1991)

=== with Acid Bath ===
- When the Kite String Pops (1994)
- Paegan Terrorism Tactics (1996)

=== with Agents of Oblivion ===
- Agents of Oblivion (2000)

=== with Deadboy & the Elephantmen ===
- If This Is Hell, Then I'm Lucky (2002; rereleased in 2008 as a solo Dax Riggs album)
- Song Mechanism EP (2004)
- We Are Night Sky (2005)

=== Solo ===
- We Sing of Only Blood or Love (2007)
- Say Goodnight to the World (2010)
- 7 Songs for Spiders (2025)

== See also ==
- Dax Riggs albums
