= Richard Ramirez =

American serial killer and sex offender (1960–2013)

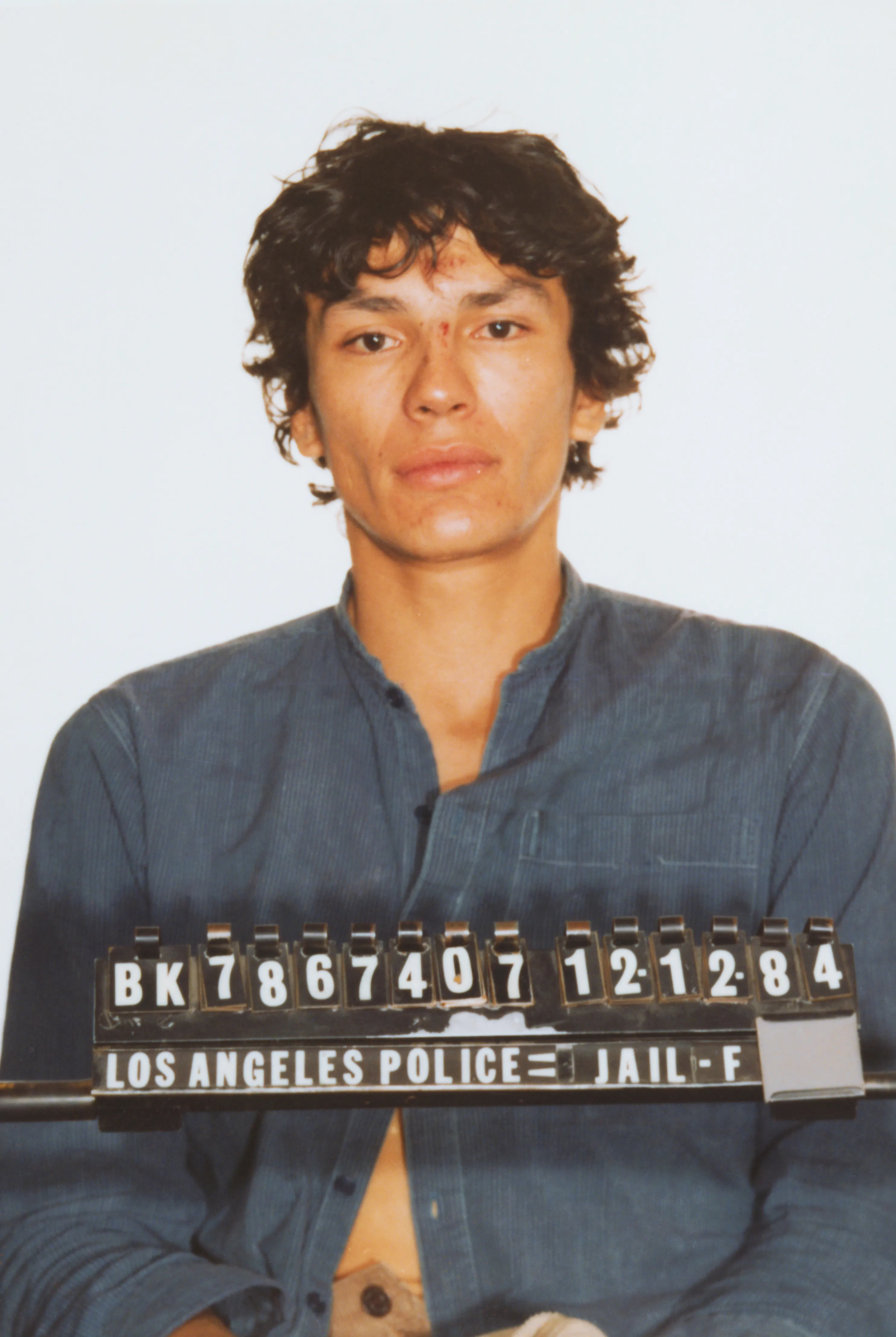
- Mugshot of Ramirez, taken on December 12, 1984, after an arrest for auto theft
- Born: Ricardo Leyva Muñoz Ramirez; February 29, 1960; El Paso, Texas, US
- Died: June 7, 2013 (aged 53); Greenbrae, California, US
- Other names: The Night Stalker; The Walk-In Killer; The Valley Intruder
- Spouse: Doreen Lioy (m. 1996, separated)
- Status: Deceased
- Motive: Unclear (Note: When Ramirez was asked why he hurt and killed his victims, he smiled and said, "No comment." When detective Frank Salerno was asked what Ramirez's motive was, he said, "To kill. It's as simple as that.")
- Convictions: First-degree murder (12 counts); Second-degree murder; Attempted murder (5 counts); Rape (11 counts); First-degree burglary (14 counts)
- Penalty: Death

Details
- Victims: 15+
- Span of crimes: April 10, 1984 – August 24, 1985
- Country: United States
- State: California
- Date apprehended: August 31, 1985

Ricardo Leyva Muñoz Ramirez (/rəˈmɪərɛz/; February 29, 1960 – June 7, 2013), better known as Richard Ramirez, was an American serial killer, sex offender, and burglar whose killing spree occurred in Greater Los Angeles and the San Francisco Bay Area in the state of California. From April 1984 to August 1985, Ramirez murdered at least 15 people during various break-ins. With his crimes usually taking place after dark, Ramirez was dubbed the Night Stalker, the Walk-In Killer, and the Valley Intruder. He was convicted and sentenced to death in 1989 and died while awaiting execution in 2013.

Ramirez's crimes were heavily influenced by a troubled childhood. Frequently abused by his father, he developed brain damage and started abusing drugs at the age of 10. He began developing interests in the macabre in his early and mid-teens from his older cousin, a Vietnam War veteran with schizophrenia and PTSD, who extensively bragged about the war crimes he had committed, and who killed his wife in front of Ramirez when Ramirez was 15. Ramirez learned military skills from him that he later employed during his killing spree. He cultivated a strong interest in Satanism and the occult. By the time he had left his home in Texas and moved to California at the age of 22, Ramirez frequently used cocaine. He often committed burglaries to support his drug addiction, many of which were later frequently accompanied by murders, attempted murders, rapes, attempted rapes and battery.

The murder spree terrorized the residents of Greater Los Angeles and later the San Francisco Bay Area over the course of 14 months. His first known murder occurred as early as April 1984; this crime was not connected to Ramirez, nor was it known to be his doing, until 2009. Ramirez used a wide variety of weapons, including handguns, various types of knives, a machete, a tire iron, and a claw hammer. He punched, pistol-whipped, and strangled many of his victims, both manually with his hands, and in one instance a ligature; stomped at least one victim to death in her sleep; and tortured another by shocking her with a live electrical cord. Ramirez also frequently enjoyed degrading and humiliating his victims, especially those who survived his attacks or whom he explicitly decided not to kill.

In 1989, Ramirez was convicted of 13 counts of murder, 5 attempted murders, 11 sexual assaults, and 14 burglaries. The judge who upheld his 19 death sentences remarked that his deeds exhibited "cruelty, callousness, and viciousness beyond any human understanding". Ramirez never expressed any remorse for his crimes. He died in June 2013 of complications from B-cell lymphoma while awaiting execution at San Quentin State Prison.

== Early life and education ==
=== Childhood ===
Ricardo Leyva Muñoz Ramirez was born in El Paso, Texas, on February 29, 1960, to Mexican immigrants Mercedes Muñoz and Julián Tapia Ramirez, the youngest of their five children. His father, a railway laborer, was a violent alcoholic who was prone to fits of anger that often resulted in physical abuse towards the household. Ramirez was brought up a Catholic. He began smoking marijuana and drinking alcohol at the age of 10.

Psychiatrist Michael Stone describes Ramirez as a "made" psychopath as opposed to a "born" psychopath. He says that Ramirez's schizoid personality disorder contributed to his indifference to the suffering of his victims and his untreatability. Stone stated that Ramirez was knocked unconscious and almost died on multiple occasions before he was six years old, and as a result "later developed temporal lobe epilepsy, aggressivity, and hypersexuality".

At age 12, Ramirez was taken under the wing of his older cousin, Miguel "Mike" Valles, a soldier in the U.S. Army who Ramirez claimed had himself been a serial killer and rapist during his service in the Vietnam War. Ramirez claimed Valles often boasted of committing gruesome war crimes in Vietnam, and shared Polaroid photos with Ramirez showing Vietnamese women whom he had raped, murdered, and dismembered or decapitated. It is alleged that many of these photos depicted women being tied to trees or wooden posts both before and after they were sexually assaulted and killed by Valles. Ramirez later stated while incarcerated that he was fascinated, rather than repulsed, by the images and stories Valles shared with him. Valles taught Ramirez some of his military skills, including stealth and kill tactics. Around this time, Ramirez began to seek escape from his father's violent temper by sleeping in a local cemetery. His father often tied him to a crucifix in a cemetery overnight as punishment.

=== Adolescence ===
Shortly after Ramirez had turned 14 in 1974, he began using LSD frequently. He and Valles resumed bonding over their shared use of drugs and alcohol. It was during this period that Ramirez began to cultivate an interest in Satanism and the occult. When he reached adolescence, Ramirez began to meld his burgeoning sexual fantasies with graphic violence, including forced bondage, murder, mutilation, and rape. As a teenager, Ramirez frequently hunted coyotes, rabbits, and birds with his father's .22 rifle in the El Paso desert at night; often disemboweling them afterwards and feeding their entrails to the family dog. While still in school, he took a job at a local Holiday Inn and used his master key to steal from sleeping patrons. On at least one occasion, Ramirez molested two children in an elevator at the hotel, but he was never reported or prosecuted for this act. His employment ended abruptly after Ramirez attempted to rape a woman in her hotel room and was caught in the act by the victim's husband. Although the husband beat Ramirez at the scene, criminal charges were dropped when the couple, who lived out of state, declined to return to Texas to testify against him.

At the age of 15, Ramirez was present on May 4, 1975, when Valles fatally shot his second wife Jesse in the face with a handgun during a domestic argument. Like the graphic photos and stories of his cousin's war crimes in Vietnam, Ramirez later remarked similarly that witnessing the murder was not traumatic for him in any traditional sense, but rather a subject of fascination. After the shooting, Ramirez became sullen and withdrawn from his family and peers, and began increasingly committing burglaries and getting high. Valles was found not guilty of Jesse's murder by reason of insanity, with the shooting attributed to post-traumatic stress disorder from his military service. Ramirez dropped out of Jefferson High School in the ninth grade, shortly before the school year ended in 1977. Former teachers and classmates from Jefferson High later reported that Ramirez was "essentially a troublemaker" known for his truancy, and that he was bullied by other students.

Shortly after the shooting, Ramirez moved in with his older sister Ruth and her husband Roberto, an obsessive peeping tom who took Ramirez along on his nocturnal exploits. After Valles was released from the mental hospital in 1977, he sometimes accompanied Ramirez and Roberto on these voyeuristic walks, spying on women in the nearby areas through their windows. In 1982, at age 22, Ramirez moved to and settled permanently in California. It was around this time that he began to use cocaine, which quickly became his substance of choice, and began to commit theft and burglaries to procure money for sustaining his addiction. He lived nomadically between San Francisco and Los Angeles County during this time prior to his incarceration.

== Murders ==
=== Murder of Mei Leung ===
On April 10, 1984, Mei Leung, a nine-year-old girl, was murdered in the basement of her apartment building in the Tenderloin district of San Francisco. Leung was with her eight-year-old brother and looking for a lost one-dollar bill when Ramirez approached the girl and told her to follow him into the basement to find it. Once they were in the basement, the killer beat, strangled, and raped Leung before stabbing her to death with a switchblade, hanging her partially nude body from a pipe by her blouse.

The killing was not linked to Ramirez until 2009, when his DNA was matched to a sample obtained at the crime scene. In 2016, officials disclosed evidence of a second suspect, identified through another DNA sample retrieved from the scene, who is believed to have been present at Leung's murder. Authorities had not publicly identified the suspect, described as being a juvenile at the time, and Ramirez never had charges brought against him for Leung's murder, owing to a lack of evidence.

=== Night Stalker crimes ===
Two months after the murder of Leung, Ramirez initiated a series of violent home invasions that sparked a moral panic in Los Angeles and later San Francisco. He began with a lone June 1984 attack before reemerging in March 1985 and continuing his spree throughout the summer, leading to one of the largest police manhunts in California history. Before his identification, the murderer was known as the Night Stalker; previously, an unrelated serial killer active in the same area from 1979 to 1981 had also been nicknamed the Night Stalker, but Ramirez's crimes quickly overshadowed those. Thus, that killer (later identified as Joseph James DeAngelo) was renamed the Original Night Stalker.

- On June 28, 1984, 79-year-old Jennie Vincow was found murdered in her apartment in Glassell Park, Los Angeles. She had been stabbed repeatedly in the head, neck, and chest while asleep in her bed, and her throat slashed so deeply that she was nearly decapitated. Ramirez's fingerprint was found on a mesh screen he removed to gain access through an open window. This, his second-known murder, established his pattern of committing particularly vicious murders and frequently burglarizing the homes of his victims either before or after killing them, which was mainly to support his drug addiction and pay his rent.
- Nine months later, on March 17, 1985, Ramirez attacked 22-year-old Maria Hernandez outside her home in Rosemead, shooting her in the face with a .22-caliber handgun after she pulled into her garage. She survived when the bullet ricocheted off the keys she held in her hands as she lifted them to protect herself. Hernandez played dead until Ramirez left the scene. Inside the house, her roommate, 34-year-old Dayle Yoshie Okazaki, heard the gunshot and ducked behind a counter when she saw Ramirez enter the kitchen. When she raised her head to get a look at what had happened, Ramirez, who was waiting for Okazaki to peek over the counter, shot her once in the forehead, killing her instantly. Within an hour of the Rosemead attack, Ramirez pulled 30-year-old Tsai-Lian "Veronica" Yu out of her car in Monterey Park, shot her twice with a .22-caliber handgun and fled. She was pronounced dead upon arrival at the hospital. The two murders, and an attempted third, in a single day attracted extensive coverage from news media, who dubbed the attacker, described as curly haired with bulging eyes and wide-spaced, rotting teeth, the "Walk-In Killer" and the "Valley Intruder".
- One week later, at approximately 2 a.m. on March 27, 1985, Ramirez entered a home that he had burglarized a year earlier just outside of Whittier and killed 64-year-old Vincent Charles Zazzara in his sleep with a gunshot to his head. Zazzara's wife, 44-year-old Maxine Levenia Zazzara, was awakened by the gunshot. Ramirez beat her and bound her hands while demanding to know where her valuables were. While he ransacked the room, Maxine escaped her bonds and retrieved a shotgun from under the bed, which she was unaware was not loaded. She pulled the trigger just after he turned around and saw her. The infuriated Ramirez shot her three times with his handgun, killing her, then fetched a large carving knife from the kitchen. He mutilated her body by cutting an inverted cross into her chest, then removed her eyes and placed them in a jewelry box. He attempted to have sex with her body but found himself so shaken by her attempting to shoot him that he was unable to achieve an erection. He took the jewelry box containing her eyes and kept it at his apartment as a souvenir until his arrest. Ramirez left footprints from a pair of Avia sneakers in the flower beds, which the police photographed and cast. Bullets found at the scene were matched to those found at previous attacks, and the police determined that a serial killer was at large.
- On May 14, 1985, Ramirez returned to Monterey Park and entered the home of 66-year-old Bill Doi and his disabled wife, 56-year-old Lillian Doi. Surprising Bill in his bedroom, Ramirez shot him in the face with a .22 semi-automatic pistol as Doi went for his own handgun. After beating Bill unconscious, Ramirez entered Lillian's bedroom, bound her with thumbcuffs, then raped her after he had ransacked the home for valuables. Bill died of his injuries while in the hospital.
- Two weeks later, on May 29, Ramirez drove a stolen car to Monrovia and stopped at the house of Mabel "Ma" Bell, age 83, and her disabled sister, 81-year-old Florence "Nettie" Lang. Finding a hammer in the kitchen, he bludgeoned and bound Lang in her bedroom, then bound and bludgeoned Bell before using an electrical cord to shock the woman. After raping Lang, he used Bell's lipstick to draw the Satanic pentagram symbol on her thigh as well as on the walls of both bedrooms. The women were found two days later, alive but comatose and critically injured. Bell died in the hospital from her injuries on July 15. Lang died in August.
- The next day, Ramirez drove the same car to Burbank and snuck into the home of 42-year-old Carol Kyle. At gunpoint, he bound Kyle and her 11-year-old son with handcuffs before ransacking the house. He released Kyle to direct him to where the family's valuables were; he then raped her repeatedly. Ramirez repeatedly ordered her not to look at him, telling her at one point that he would "cut her eyes out". He fled the scene after retrieving the child from the closet and binding the two together again with the handcuffs.
- On the night of July 2, 1985, Ramirez drove a stolen car to Arcadia and randomly selected the house of 75-year-old Mary Louise Cannon, a widowed grandmother. After quietly entering Cannon's home, he found her asleep in her bedroom. He bludgeoned her into unconsciousness with a lamp and stabbed her to death using a 10-inch butcher knife from her kitchen. Ramirez repeatedly stabbed Cannon's body after she was already dead.
- Three nights later, Ramirez broke into a home in Sierra Madre and bludgeoned 16-year-old Whitney Bennett with a tire iron as she slept in her bedroom. After searching in vain for a knife in the kitchen, Ramirez tried to strangle the girl with a telephone cord. He stated that he was startled to see electrical sparks emanate from the cord, and when his victim began to breathe he fled the house believing that Jesus Christ had intervened to save her. Bennett survived the attack, although 478 stitches were required to close the lacerations to her scalp.
- On July 7, Ramirez burglarized the home of 60-year-old Joyce Lucille Nelson in Monterey Park. Finding her asleep on her living room couch, he beat her to death by stomping on her face repeatedly. A shoe print from an Avia sneaker was left imprinted on her face. After cruising two other neighborhoods, he returned to Monterey Park and chose the home of Sophie Dickman, age 63. Ramirez assaulted and handcuffed Dickman at gunpoint, attempted to rape her, and stole her jewelry; when she swore to him that he had taken everything of value, he told her to "swear on Satan".
- Two weeks later, on July 20, Ramirez purchased a machete before driving a stolen Toyota to Glendale. He chose the home of 66-year-old Lela Kneiding and her husband, 68-year-old Maxon Kneiding. He burst into the sleeping couple's bedroom and hacked them with the machete, then killed them with shots to the head from a .22-caliber handgun. He further mutilated their bodies with the machete before robbing the house of valuables. After quickly fencing the stolen items, Ramirez drove to Sun Valley, Los Angeles, and broke into the home of the Khovananth family. He shot the sleeping 32-year-old Chainarong Khovananth in the head with a .22-caliber handgun, killing him instantly, then repeatedly raped and beat 32-year-old Somkid Khovananth. He bound the couple's 8-year-old son before dragging Somkid around the house to reveal the location of any valuable items, which he stole. During his assault, he demanded that she "swear to Satan" that she was not hiding any money from him.
- On August 6, 1985, Ramirez drove to Northridge and broke into the home of 30-year-old Chris Peterson and Virginia Peterson, age 27. He crept into the bedroom, startled Virginia and shot her in the face with a .25-caliber semi-automatic handgun. He shot Chris in the neck and attempted to flee; Chris fought back while avoiding being hit by two more shots during the struggle before Ramirez managed to escape. The couple survived their injuries.
- Two nights later, Ramirez drove a stolen car to Diamond Bar and chose the home of Sakina Abowath, age 27, and her husband 35-year-old Elyas Abowath. Sometime after 2:30 a.m. he entered the house and went into the master bedroom. He instantly killed the sleeping Elyas with a shot to the head from a .25-caliber handgun. He handcuffed and beat Sakina while forcing her to reveal the locations of the family's jewelry, and then brutally raped her. He repeatedly demanded that she "swear on Satan" that she would not scream during his assaults. When the couple's three-year-old son entered the bedroom, Ramirez tied the child up and continued to rape Sakina. After he left the house, Sakina untied her son and sent him to the neighbors for help. Ramirez, who had been closely following news coverage of his crimes, left Los Angeles and headed to San Francisco.
- On August 18, he entered the home of 66-year-old Peter Pan and 62-year-old Barbara Pan. He shot the sleeping Peter in the temple with a .25-caliber handgun, killing him instantly. He beat and sexually assaulted Barbara before shooting her in the head and leaving her for dead, though she ultimately survived her injuries. At the crime scene, Ramirez used lipstick to scrawl a pentagram and the phrase "Jack the Knife" on the bedroom wall. He again left a shoe print at the scene that detectives discovered and matched to a specific pair of Avia shoes that was not common at the time.
- On August 24, 1985, Ramirez traveled 76 miles (122 km) south of Los Angeles, in a stolen orange Toyota, to Mission Viejo. That night, he arrived at the home of 45-year-old James Romero Jr., who had just returned from a family vacation to Rosarito Beach in Mexico. Romero's son, 13-year-old James Romero III, was awake. While his family was asleep, James went outside of his house to retrieve a pillow inside a truck, which was locked. When he was outside, he heard a rustling noise. Assuming it was an animal, James went to investigate but did not notice anything out of the ordinary. James went into his garage to begin working on his minibike before hearing Ramirez's footsteps outside the house. Thinking there was a prowler, James, after observing Ramirez through his bedroom window, went to wake his parents, and Ramirez fled the scene. James raced outside and noted the color, make, and style of the car, as well as a partial license plate number. Romero contacted the police with this information, believing James had chased away a thief.
- With his attack on the Romero residence aborted, Ramirez broke into the home of 30-year-old Bill Carns and his fiancée, 29-year-old Inez Erickson, through a back door. Ramirez entered the sleeping couple's bedroom and awakened Carns when he cocked his .25-caliber handgun. He shot Carns three times in the head before turning his attention to Erickson. Ramirez identified himself as the "Night Stalker" and forced her to swear she loved Satan as he beat her with his fists and bound her with neckties from the closet. After stealing what he could find, Ramirez dragged Erickson to another room before raping her. He demanded cash and jewelry and made her "swear on Satan" there was no more. Before leaving the home, he told Erickson, "Tell them the Night Stalker was here." Erickson untied herself and went to a neighbor's house for help. Surgeons removed two of the three bullets from Carns's head, and he survived his injuries.

=== Suspected victims ===
On the night of June 27, 1985, 32-year-old Patty Elaine Higgins was murdered in her Arcadia home. The crime was not discovered until July 2, when she failed to show up for work. Her attacker had sodomized her, strangled her, and slashed her throat. Ramirez was charged with murder and burglary in relation to Higgins's death. However, these charges were eventually dropped due to a lack of concrete physical evidence linking Higgins to the other murders.

Based on a statement Ramirez made to an investigator, he is also a suspect in the San Francisco double murder of 58-year-old Christina Caldwell and 70-year-old Mary Caldwell. The sisters were found stabbed to death in their Telegraph Hill apartment on February 20, 1985. While incarcerated, Ramirez openly bragged to a prison officer and other inmates about having killed "more than 20 people".

=== Investigation ===
Lead detectives Frank Salerno and Gil Carrillo contacted the manufacturer of the shoes and were able to retrieve the soles. Upon the discovery of the make and distribution across the United States, only six of them existed in the men's size 11½. With five of them shipped to locations in Arizona, and one shipped to a shoe store in Los Angeles, it was evident that the one pair of its size and kind in the state of California belonged to the perpetrator. When it was discovered that the ballistics and shoe print evidence from the Los Angeles crime scenes matched the Pan crime scene, San Francisco's mayor Dianne Feinstein divulged the information, including the gun caliber, in a televised press conference. This leak infuriated detectives, as they knew the killer would be following news coverage, which gave him the opportunity to destroy crucial forensic evidence. Ramirez, who had indeed been watching the press, dropped his sneakers over the side of the Golden Gate Bridge that night. He remained in the area for a few more days before heading back to the Los Angeles area.

=== Identification of Ramirez ===
Erickson gave a detailed description of her assailant to investigators, and police obtained a cast of Ramirez's footprint from the Romero house. The stolen Toyota was found abandoned on August 28 in Koreatown, Los Angeles, and police obtained a single fingerprint from the rear-view mirror despite Ramirez's careful efforts to wipe the car clean of his prints. The print was positively identified as belonging to Ramirez, who was described by police as a 25-year-old drifter from Texas, with a long rap sheet that included many arrests for traffic and illegal drug violations. The identification of Ramirez's print was described as a "near miracle" as the system used to identify him was recently installed, as well as the fact that the system contained the fingerprints of criminals born after January 1, 1960, only two months before Ramirez was born.

On August 29, 1985, law enforcement officials decided to release a mug shot of Ramirez from a 1984 arrest for auto theft to the media. At the police press conference, it was announced: "We know who you are now, and soon everyone else will. There will be no place you can hide."

== Capture ==
On August 30, 1985, Ramirez took a bus to Tucson, Arizona, to visit his brother, unaware that he had become the lead story in virtually every major newspaper and television news program across California. After failing to meet his brother due to his not being home, he returned to Los Angeles early on the morning of August 31. He walked past police officers, who were staking out the bus terminal in hopes of catching the killer should he attempt to flee on an outbound bus, and into a convenience store in East Los Angeles.

After noticing a group of elderly Hispanic women fearfully identifying him as "el matador" (Spanish for "the killer"), Ramirez saw his face on the front page of the newspaper La Opinión with a headline calling him "Invasor Nocturno" (English: "Night Invader") and fled the store in a panic. After running across the Santa Ana Freeway, he attempted to carjack an unlocked Ford Mustang but was pulled out by angry residents Faustino Pinon and Jose Burgoin. Ramirez ran across the street and attempted to take car keys from Angelina De La Torre. Her husband, Manuel De La Torre, witnessed the attempt and struck Ramirez over the head with a fence post in the pursuit. A group of over ten residents (including Jose Burgoin's sons) formed and chased Ramirez down Hubbard Street in Boyle Heights. They restrained Ramirez and beat him. At around 8 a.m., police were called over a disturbance in the area with few other details. Police arrived on Hubbard Street and took a severely beaten Ramirez into custody.

== Trial and conviction ==
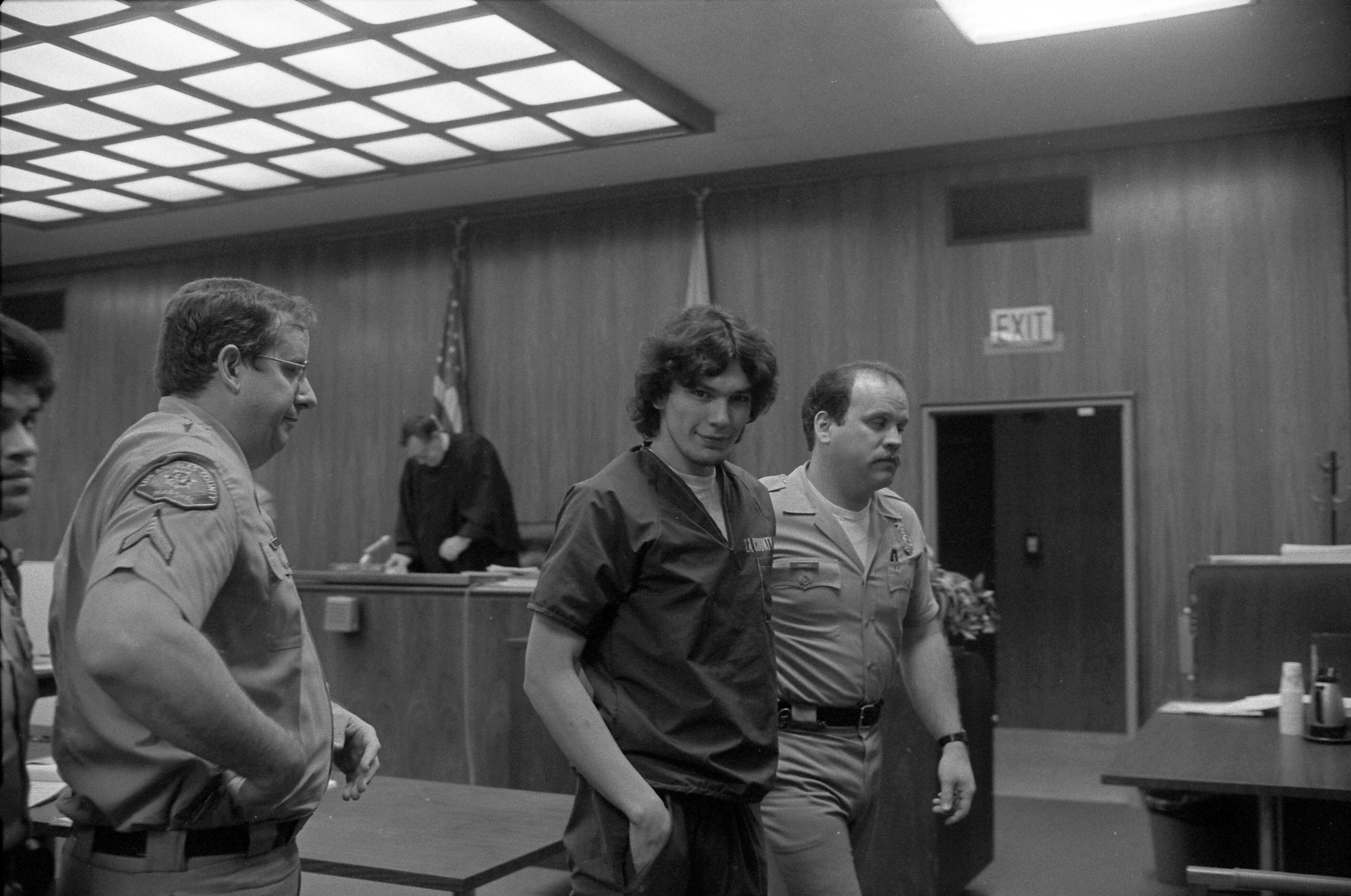
Ramirez being escorted from court by sheriffs

Jury selection for Ramirez's trial began on July 22, 1988. At his first court appearance, he raised a hand with a pentagram drawn on it and yelled, "Hail Satan!" On August 3, 1988, the Los Angeles Times reported that some jail employees overheard Ramirez planning to shoot the prosecutor with a gun, which he intended to have smuggled into the courtroom. Consequently, a metal detector was installed outside and intensive searches were conducted on people entering.

On August 14, the trial was interrupted because one of the jurors, Phyllis Singletary, did not arrive at the courtroom. Later that day, she was found shot to death in her apartment. The jury was terrified, wondering if Ramirez had somehow directed this event from inside his prison cell, and whether or not he could reach other jurors. However, it was ultimately determined that Ramirez was not responsible for Singletary's death, as she was shot and killed by her boyfriend, who later committed suicide with the same weapon in a hotel. The alternate juror who replaced Singletary was too frightened to return to her home.

On September 20, 1989, Ramirez was convicted of all 43 charges: 13 counts of murder, 5 attempted murders, 11 sexual assaults, and 14 burglaries. During the penalty phase of the trial on November 7, 1989, he was sentenced to death in California's gas chamber. He stated to reporters after the death sentences, "Big deal. Death always went with the territory. See you in Disneyland." The trial cost $1.8 million, which at the time made it the most expensive murder trial in the history of California until it was surpassed by the O. J. Simpson case in 1994.

== Incarceration and death ==
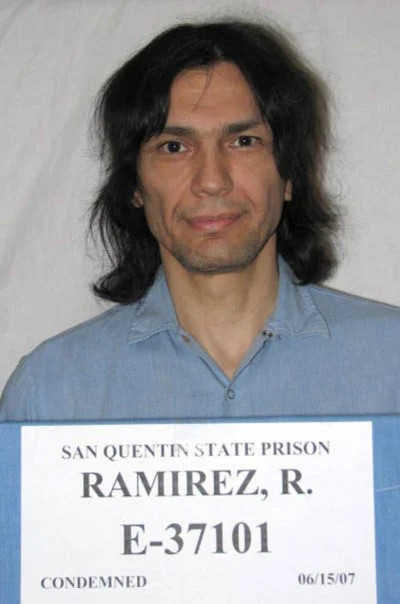
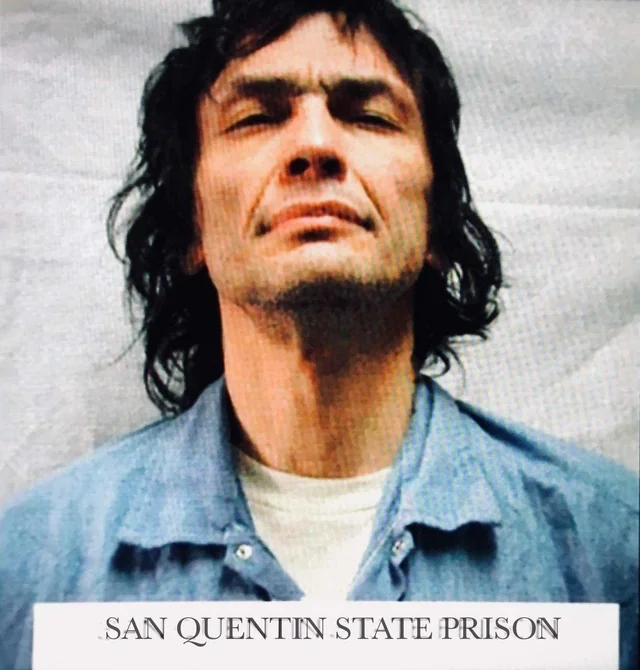
Mugshots of Ramirez in 2007 (left) and in 2013 (right); the latter mugshot being the final photographic appearance of Ramirez before his death

While awaiting trial, Ramirez reportedly met actor Sean Penn, who had been jailed for 33 days in 1987 for reckless driving and punching an extra on the set of the film Colors. Penn said Ramirez had asked for his autograph through a deputy and later sent him a friendly note, to which he wrote back telling Ramirez he had no sympathy and hoped he died in the gas chamber.

By the time of the trial, Ramirez had fans who were writing him letters and paying him visits. Beginning in 1985, Doreen Lioy wrote Ramirez nearly 75 letters during his incarceration. In 1988, he proposed to Lioy, and on October 3, 1996, they were married in California's San Quentin State Prison. For many years before Ramirez's death, Lioy stated that she would commit suicide when Ramirez was executed, but did not do so. By the time of his death in 2013, Ramirez was engaged to a 23-year-old writer.

On August 7, 2006, Ramirez's first round of state appeals ended unsuccessfully when the California Supreme Court upheld his convictions and death sentence. On September 7, 2006, the California Supreme Court denied his request for a rehearing. Ramirez had additional appeals pending until the time of his death. Ramirez died of complications secondary to B-cell lymphoma at Marin General Hospital in Greenbrae, California, on June 7, 2013, at age 53. He had also been affected by "chronic substance abuse and chronic hepatitis C viral infection."

== In popular culture ==
- "Richard Ramirez Died Today of Natural Causes" is a 2013 song by Sun Kil Moon, on the album Benji, dealing with cultural and personal impact of Ramirez's unsensational death relative to the fear his activity once induced.
- Night Stalker: The Hunt for a Serial Killer is a 2021 documentary released by Netflix featuring first-person interviews, archival footage, newly shot reenactments, and original photography related to the case.
- Artwork drawn by Ramirez is featured on the cover art for Acid Bath's "Radio Edits 1".

== See also ==
- Joseph James DeAngelo – also known as the Original Night Stalker, who began his crime spree in California in 1976, and shared a similar moniker to the public
- Delroy Grant – a serial rapist who operated in London during the 1990s and 2000s, sometimes referred to by the British media as the "Night Stalker"
- List of serial killers in the United States
- List of violent incidents at the Cecil Hotel

== Bibliography ==
- Carlo, Philip (1996). The Night Stalker: The Life and Crimes of Richard Ramirez (Paperback ed.). New York, New York: Kensington Publishing Corp. ISBN 978-0-786-00379-2.
- Foreman, Laura (1992). Serial Killers – True Crime (Hardcover ed.). Alexandria, Virginia: Time-Life Books. ISBN 978-0-7835-0001-0.
- Wilson, Colin (2006). Serial Killer Investigations: The Story of Forensics And Profiling Through The Hunt For The World's Worst Murderers. Irvington, NY: Hylas Pub. ISBN 9781592582747.
