= We Are Night Sky =

Studio album by Deadboy & the Elephantmen
- Released: February 7, 2006
- Recorded: 2005
- Genre: Blues rock, punk blues
- Length: 38:00
- Label: Fat Possum

Deadboy & the Elephantmen chronology
Song Mechanism (2004)	We Are Night Sky (2006)

Professional ratings
Review scores
Source	Rating
AllMusic	4/5 stars
Rolling Stone	4/5 stars
Pitchfork	5.7/10

We Are Night Sky is the second and final full-length album of Deadboy & the Elephantmen. It is also the first full-length album to feature drummer Tessie Brunet. It is the first of the three records contract with Fat Possum Records.

The album was released at two different times. The first release was online in late 2005. The store date was February 7, 2006. By the time the album's official release date came, the band was already touring the United States.

"Stop, I'm Already Dead" is used as the opening theme to the 2015 TV series iZombie. It is also featured in the 2008 Horror film Day of the Dead.

== Track listings ==
=== Album ===
1. "Stop, I'm Already Dead" (2:19)
2. "No Rainbow" (4:35)
3. "How Long the Night Was" (3:14)
4. "Ancient Man" (3:17)
5. "Dressed in Smoke" (3:57)
6. "Blood Music" (3:36)
7. "Walking Stick" (3:25)
8. "Kissed by Lightning" (2:04)
9. "Misadventures of Dope" (2:30)
10. "Break it Off" (3:47)
11. "Evil Friend" (3:09)
12. "What the Stars Have Eaten" (2:52)

=== Demo 1 ===
1. "Nevermind the Scenery, it's Only Bleeding" (3:17)
2. "Wicked Tongue" (3:28)
3. "What the Stars Have Eaten" (4:20)
4. "Frank's Riff" (2:40)

=== Demo 2 ===
1. "Kissed by Lightning" (2:09)
2. "Walking Stick" (2:03)
3. "Nevermind the Scenery, it's Only Bleeding" (3:15)
4. "What the Stars Have Eaten" (3:59)
5. "Wicked Tongue" (3:26)
6. "What the Stars Have Eaten" (2:45)

== Outtakes ==
At least three outtakes exist from We Are Night Sky. The songs, "Scarlett of Heaven Nor Hell," "Die a Little" and "Never Mind the Scenery, It's Only Bleeding" were written and recorded along with the rest of the album but, for whatever reason, were not included on the final release. They are available, however, in several places. "Scarlett of Heaven Nor Hell" would go on to be featured on Dax Riggs' first solo album We Sing of Only Blood or Love.

"Die a Little" was released as a single through iTunes and all three are available on officially released live recordings. The Lollapalooza 2006 release includes all three outtake tracks as well as a cover of The Pixies' "Wave of Mutilation". The Austin City Limits release includes "Die a Little" and "Scarlett of Heaven Nor Hell." Both releases are available as digital downloads only.

== Trivia ==
- Riggs played a handful of songs from this album before Brunet joined the band. Usually, Riggs would be performing solo sets, and the songs would be slower, played on acoustic guitar.
