= Deadboy & the Elephantmen =

American indie rock band

- Origin: Houma, Louisiana, U.S.
- Genres: Indie rock; swamp rock; alternative rock
- Years active: 2000–2007
- Labels: Fat Possum, Rotten
- Past members: Dax Riggs: vocals, guitar Tess Brunet: drums Alex Bergeron: bass Adam Clement: drums Sean Keating: keyboards Jason Dupre: guitar Christopher T. Gautreaux: bass Jeff Lecompte: drums Chuck Pitre: Piano Keyboards; Niki Rhodes Jr.: guitar T-Boy: bass

Deadboy & the Elephantmen was an American indie rock band active from 2000 to 2007. Based in Houma, Louisiana, the band was fronted by Dax Riggs (of Acid Bath and formerly of Agents of Oblivion).

After disputes with an independent label over the distribution of their debut album If This Is Hell, Then I'm Lucky, the band signed a three-record deal with Fat Possum. For the latter part of 2005, and most of 2006, they toured in support of their major label debut We Are Night Sky, playing from bars and smaller venues to Lollapalooza, Austin City Limits, and Bonnaroo. In early 2006, Riggs recruited his former Agents of Oblivion bandmate, Alex Bergeron, to play bass on tour. Later that year, the band was primarily a duo of Riggs and Tess Brunet. This lineup was often compared to The White Stripes in reviews, and their music is sometimes referred to as "swamp rock". By 2007, Brunet left the band and Riggs went on to a solo career. In 2015, their track "Stop, I'm Already Dead" became the theme song for The CW television series iZombie.

== Background ==
Deadboy & the Elephantmen first appeared in late 2000, following in the wake of the breakup of Agents of Oblivion. The band was created by two former Agents of Oblivion members, Dax Riggs (Acid Bath, Agents Of Oblivion) and Chuck Pitre (Gawk Solie, Goggle Eye, Psycho Kitty, Agents of Oblivion). By early 2001, they had expanded to a full lineup. Members included Chuck Pitre Piano, Keyboards, Jason Dupre on the guitar, Christopher T. Gautreaux on the bass, and Jeff LeCompte on the drums, and Niki Rhodes Jr. on the guitar.

A rare, eight-song CD was released in late 2000 called "the 8 song demo". Shortly after, the two main composers Niki and Chuck (producer, composer and arranger) left the band.

Deadboy's first label-backed album, If This Is Hell, Then I'm Lucky was released in 2002. The album was discontinued and for a time was extremely hard to find. However, it has recently been re-released by Rotten Records and Fat Possum. Fat Possum's re-issue altered the artwork, spine and disc to say Dax Riggs instead of Deadboy and The Elephantmen. Rotten's re-issue kept the original art intact.

Following the first album, several band members quit, so Dax Riggs sought new musicians. The lineup for the first album consisted of Jason Dupre on the guitar, Christopher T. Gautreaux on the bass, and Jeff LeCompte on the drums. Niki Rhodes Jr. then rejoined the project and Christopher (saxophone and keyboard) began working with him on futuristic techno rock. Other musicians were then brought in after Christopher and Niki left the group, and New York City-based Nasty Little Man handled the band's live promotions. It was during this time that Brunet was recruited and the two began recording.

An EP, Song Mechanism, was released in late 2004. It was distributed by Riggs through Deadboy's website and various local Louisiana music stores. It too has been discontinued though all four tracks from the EP later appeared on We Are Night Sky.

We Are Night Sky was made available for purchase online in late 2005, but its official release date was February 7, 2006. While it is technically the second full-length album for Deadboy & The Elephantmen, it is the first featuring the simpler two-person lineup and is better distributed than previous efforts, and as such is often referred to as their 'debut' album.

Upon discovering We Are Night Sky, Henry Rollins began championing the band on his radio show Harmony in My Head and his TV show The Henry Rollins Show. He has since had the band on the latter to perform "Stop, I'm Already Dead".

In late 2006, Brunet left the band, but it has yet to be stated why and under what terms. In April 2007, it was announced that the band was no more, and further records will be released under Dax Riggs' own name.

== Musical style and influences ==
Deadboy & the Elephantmen is most often described as indie rock, alternative rock and swamp rock, and incorporates elements of blues, psychedelic rock, stoner rock and metal. Their lyrics were often dark in nature, dealing with subjects such as death, blood and Armageddon.

== Discography ==
=== Studio albums ===
- If This Is Hell, Then I'm Lucky (2002)
- We Are Night Sky (2006)

=== Singles ===
- "Stop, I'm Already Dead" (2006)

=== Covers ===
Songs covered by Deadboy & the Elephantmen.

- Leonard Cohen – I'm Your Man
- Leonard Cohen – Chelsea Hotel No. 2
- Pixies – Wave of Mutilation
- Nick Cave and the Bad Seeds – As I Sat Sadly By Her Side
- Bonnie "Prince" Billy – Grand Dark Feeling of Emptiness
- The Rolling Stones – Dead Flowers
- Nick Drake – Been Smokin' Too Long
- Bob Dylan – Death Is Not The End
- The Beatles – Yesterday
- Richard Thompson – Wall of Death
