= Agents of Oblivion =

American rock band

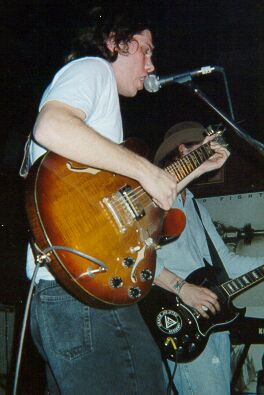
- Dax Riggs (foreground) and Mike Sanchez performing at Shanahan's in Lafayette, Louisiana

Background information
- Origin: Houma, Louisiana, U.S.
- Years active: 1999–2000
- Label: Rotten
- Spinoff of: Acid Bath
- Members: Dax Riggs: vocals, guitar Mike Sanchez: guitar Alex Bergeron: bass Danny Barnett: guitar Jeff McCarty: drums Chuck Pitre: keyboards

Agents of Oblivion was an American rock band from Louisiana that evolved from Acid Bath. Fronted by Dax Riggs, their sound displayed influences from swamp rock, psychedelic rock, blues rock, grunge and metal, among others.

== History ==
After Audie Pitre died, Dax Riggs decided to form a slower band in Daisyhead & The Mooncrickets. However, it only laid out the basics of what was to come. Soon after, Agents of Oblivion was formed, a band including two former members of Acid Bath, Riggs and Mike Sanchez. The title of the band derives from a line in "The Beautiful Downgrade", sometimes known as "Bonus Poem" from Acid Bath's last album Paegan Terrorism Tactics. "The agents of oblivion descend upon the sane, caked with mud and mother's blood."

The band released one self-titled album in 2000—which, while acclaimed, attracted relatively little notice outside of the South—and broke up soon after. Riggs went on to form Deadboy and the Elephantmen with Chuck Pitre. Alex Bergeron, formerly of local Houma band SlowTheKnife, joined later and continued on with Rigg's post-Deadboy solo work.

== Discography ==
- 1999: Agents of Oblivion demo
- 2000: Agents of Oblivion
