= Song Mechanism =

EP by Deadboy & the Elephantmen
- Released: 2004
- Length: 18:47
- Label: Self-released

Deadboy & the Elephantmen chronology
If This Is Hell, Then I'm Lucky (2002)	Song Mechanism (2004)	We Are Night Sky (2006)

Originally distributed through Deadboy & the Elephantmen's website, and also by various local Louisiana music stores, Song Mechanism showcases four songs that were later included in Deadboy's second full-length album We Are Night Sky. The EP is no longer in print.

== Track listings ==
1. "How Long the Night Was" (2:42)
2. "Blood Music" (5:30)
3. "Dressed Up in Smoke" (4:52)
4. "The Misadventures of Dope" (5:43)
