= Twin Tigers =

- Origin: Athens, Georgia, United States
- Genres: Alternative rock, Pop punk, Indie Rock
- Years active: Fall 2007–present
- Label: Old Flame Records
- Members: Matthew Rain; Aimee Morris; Logan Hornbuckle; Forrest Hall
- Website: www.thetwintigers.com

Twin Tigers is an American rock band from Athens, Georgia formed in 2007 by Matthew Rain and Aimee Morris.

== Formation and early work ==
Twin Tigers was formed in Fall 2007 by Matthew Rain and Aimee Morris. They were both co-workers at the Grit restaurant located in a building owned by Michael Stipe of R.E.M. and both abandoned their other bands to work together. Soon, they added Enoch Bledsoe and Richard Young to the band. They released the EP Curious Faces Violet Future in January 2008. Eventually Blesdoe and Young left the band and were replaced by drummer Doug Crump and guitarist Forrest Hall a few weeks before the band went to SXSW in 2008. Their first album, Gray Waves, was released in March 2010. Following two years of non stop tour the band met Logan "The Cute One" Hornbuckle who relocated from Chapel Hill, NC to live with the band in their Athens, Georgia house/studio "Tiger Mansion".

== Discography ==
Year	Details
2008	Curious Faces Violet Future: Length: EP; Released: January 30, 2008; Label: Self Released; Format: CD
2010	Gray Waves: Length: LP; Released: March 2, 2010; Label: Old Flame Records; Format: CD, digital download, LP
2013	Death Wish: Length: LP; Released: April 9, 2013; Label: Old Flame Records; Format: CD, digital download, LP
