= Paegan Terrorism Tactics =

Studio album by Acid Bath
- Released: November 12, 1996
- Recorded: 1996
- Studios: Festival Recording Studios, Kenner, Louisiana
- Genre: Sludge metal
- Length: 71:33
- Label: Rotten
- Producer: Keith Falgout

Acid Bath chronology
Radio Edits 1 (1994)	Paegan Terrorism Tactics (1996)	Radio Edits II (1996)

Professional ratings
Review scores
Source	Rating
AllMusic	4/5 stars
Chronicles of Chaos	9/10
Collector's Guide to Heavy Metal	8/10

Paegan Terrorism Tactics is the second and final studio album by American sludge metal band Acid Bath. It is the band's last album before their disbanding in 1997 due to the death of bassist Audie Pitre.

The album was written while the band was touring. The album and first track spell "paegan" with an added "e" to resemble Old English.

Like the previous album, When the Kite String Pops, the album cover is a painting by a serial killer. The cover art was painted by Dr. Jack Kevorkian. This caused controversy at the time.

== Overview ==
The lyrics on this album are poetic and further showcase Dax Riggs's dark sense of humor. "Paegan Love Song", according to Riggs, makes references to when the band was visiting a beach in Florida, where some people offered the band a deliriant called Angel's Trumpets. Riggs said the trip lasted for days, and the lines "dying felt so goddamn good today" refer to the band members waking up delirious on these flowers. "Eating dead flowers bleeding in a strange daze" among other lines in the song reference the experience of waking up on the beach with this seemingly strange intoxicated state. On the Double Live Bootleg! DVD (2002) the band introduces the song by saying "Rock 'N' Roll makes the world go 'round, drinking fucking beer and smoking pot! This is Paegan Love Song." "Graveflower" has a guitar solo that heavily employs a drone. "13 Fingers" and "New Corpse" experiment with black metal musicianship. Sammy Duet co-wrote the lyrics for "Diäb Soulé" and "New Corpse". "Diäb Soulé" is Cajun French for the "drunken devil". The liner notes present Sammy Duet as Sammy "Pierre" Duet, which is a nickname Riggs gave him because a historical witch was named Sammy Pierre Duet. The poem/hidden track "Ode of the Paegan" is sometimes cited or referred to as "The Beautiful Downgrade" and appear as such in Riggs's poetry books. The hidden track along with the track "Old Skin" make up the two spoken word poems on the album. While in Mexico, the band took a reverse negative photo of the head of a decapitated animal and originally intended on using that as the album cover. They later decided on Kevorkian's artwork. The initial artwork can be found on various sites on the internet. The song "Dead Girl" was covered by a later band that Riggs was in, Agents of Oblivion on their self titled album

== Track listing ==
All tracks are written by Dax Riggs, unless otherwise noted.

No.	Title	Lyrics	Length
1.	"Paegan Love Song"		5:40
2.	"Bleed Me an Ocean"		6:15
3.	"Graveflower"		6:07
4.	"Diäb Soulé"	Riggs, Duet	4:34
5.	"Locust Spawning"		4:40
6.	"Old Skin"		1:11
7.	"New Death Sensation"		6:44
8.	"Venus Blue"		4:42
9.	"13 Fingers"		4:10
10.	"New Corpse"		3:22
11.	"Dead Girl" (ends at 7:23; hidden track "The Beautiful Downgrade" begins at 22:29)		24:08
Total length:			71:33

Notes

- Track 1 is listed in the liner notes as "Pagan Love Song".
- The hidden track is sometimes mislabeled as "Ode of the Paegan".

== Personnel ==
All credits for Paegan Terrorism Tactics are adapted from the album's liner notes, except where noted.

Acid Bath

- Dax Riggs – lead vocals
- Mike Sanchez – guitar
- Sammy "Pierre" Duet – guitar, backing vocals
- Audie Pitre – bass, backing vocals
- Jimmy Kyle – drums; photography

Production

- Keith Falgout – production, engineering, mixing
- Matt "Heavy" Akin – assistant engineer
- Spice – samples, intern
- Chris Robinson – intern
- John "Feedback" Gilmore – intern
- Dr. Jack Kevorkian – original cover art
