= When the Kite String Pops =

Studio album by Acid Bath
- Released: August 8, 1994
- Recorded: 1991-1994
- Studios: Side One, Metairie, Louisiana
- Genre: Sludge metal
- Length: 69:02
- Label: Rotten
- Producers: Spike Cassidy; Greg Troyner; Acid Bath

Acid Bath chronology
Hymns of the Needle Freak (1993)	When the Kite String Pops (1994)	Radio Edits 1 (1994)

When the Kite String Pops is the debut studio album of American sludge metal band Acid Bath. Released on August 8, 1994, it is considered an underground classic and an early example of sludge metal. The album's artwork is a self-portrait made by notorious serial killer John Wayne Gacy while in prison awaiting execution.

== Background ==
Acid Bath formed in 1991 in Louisiana, as an incarnation of two bands, Dark Karnival which featured Audie Pitre, Sammy Pierre Duet, and Tommy Viator, and Golgotha which featured Dax Riggs, Mike Sanchez, Jimmy Kyle, and Jerry "Boon" Businelli. Golgotha's bassists were in frequent rotation finally culminating with Chad Pierce, who would then be succeeded by Pitre during Acid Bath's formation. Tommy Viator was later replaced by Jimmy Kyle on drums but would return to play keyboards toward the end of the band's career. Joseph J. Fontenot was the bassist for a short period of time.

In 1993, the band recorded and released their demo Hymns of the Needle Freak with their manager and producer Keith Falgout in 1993. The strength of the demo earned them a deal.

== Musical style and themes ==
Though considered a cornerstone of sludge metal, the album combines multiple eclectic influences from genres such as death metal, gothic rock, blues, grunge, southern rock and industrial rock.

On the Double Live Bootleg! DVD (2002), vocalist Dax Riggs introduced the song "Tranquilized" by saying, "This song is about getting high any way you do it, and kicking the earth from beneath you" and "Cheap Vodka" by saying, "This song is about getting wasted and killing things, blood, sex, and blasphemy." "Toubabo Koomi" is Cajun French for "land of the white cannibals." It was the only Acid Bath song that was made into a music video. According to guitarist Sammy Duet, the alligator which appeared in the video ended up biting someone's face. The song "God Machine" begins with a spoken word introduction by Riggs, and samples a clip from The Jerry Springer Show featuring a jewish child saying "Was it I who crucified your God?".

== Cover art ==
The album's cover art is a painting by John Wayne Gacy named "Pogo the Clown", sometimes referred to as "Pogo the Clown #15", in which he depicts himself as his clown alter-ego, "Pogo the Clown". The balloons on the lower part contain both his nickname and his real name, J. W. Gacy. The back of the album also features another Gacy painting known as "Skull Clown", which is a depiction of a skull wearing a clown hat.

The use of artwork by a convicted serial killer caused controversy, with Rotten Records president Ron Peterson defending the decision by saying, "It's America—you should be able to do what you want." Acid Bath's follow-up album, Paegan Terrorism Tactics, continued the provocative streak by using artwork created by euthanasia proponent Jack Kevorkian.

== Reception ==
Professional ratings
Review scores
Source	Rating
The Albuquerque Tribune	Good
AllMusic	3/5 stars
Collector's Guide to Heavy Metal	7/10
Sputnikmusic	4.5/5 (2012); 5/5 (2016)

In 1999, sales of the album were just over 37,000 copies in the US, which is higher than average for a band with no publicity and released exclusively on an independent label.

In the years following the band's breakup, the album has grown to receive critical acclaim, and has since become regarded as an underground classic and seminal album in heavy metal. In 2012, Randall Cunningham of Sputnikmusic described the album as "an essential, volatile mix of all things horrific and unforgiving".

== Track listing ==
All songs written and composed by Acid Bath.

No.	Title	Length
1.	"The Blue"	6:13
2.	"Tranquilized"	4:14
3.	"Cheap Vodka"	2:14
4.	"Finger Paintings of the Insane"	6:04
5.	"Jezebel"	4:53
6.	"Scream of the Butterfly"	6:14
7.	"Dr. Seuss Is Dead"	6:04
8.	"Dope Fiend"	5:19
9.	"Toubabo Koomi"	5:01
10.	"God Machine"	5:00
11.	"The Morticians Flame"	4:05
12.	"What Color Is Death?"	3:19
13.	"The Bones of Baby Dolls"	6:00
14.	"Cassie Eats Cockroaches"	4:22
Total length:		69:02

- Track 10 contains samples from an episode of The Jerry Springer Show. Track 14 contains samples from the 1971 Stanley Kubrick film A Clockwork Orange, as well as the 1986 David Lynch film Blue Velvet.
- On Apple Music and iTunes, track 7 is referred to as "Dr. Soose is Dead".
- Tracks 4, 11 and 12 were originally made by Golgotha, an early version of what would become Acid Bath.

== Music videos ==
- "Toubabo Koomi"

Directed by Bruce Martin and filmed in several locations in Louisiana, such as swamps and a condemned building that they were not given permission to film in.

== Personnel ==
All credits for When the Kite String Pops are adapted from the album's liner notes, except where noted.

=== Acid Bath ===
- Sammy "Pierre" Duet – guitar, backing vocals
- Jimmy Kyle – drums
- Audie Pitre – bass, backing vocals
- Dax Riggs – lead vocals
- Mike Sanchez – guitar, backing vocals

=== Production ===
- Spike Cassidy – production, recording, mixing, mastering
- Greg Troyner – co-production, recording, mixing
- Acid Bath – co-production
- Eddie Schreyer – mastering
- John Wayne Gacy – front and back cover art
- Mike Wasco – photography
