= Acid Bath =

American sludge metal band

- Acid Bath in 1994. From left: Mike Sanchez, Jimmy Kyle (at back), Audie Pitre (in front), Dax Riggs, Sammy Duet

Background information
- Origin: Houma, Louisiana, U.S.
- Genre: Sludge metal
- Years active: 1991–1997; 2024–present
- Label: Rotten
- Spinoffs: Agents of Oblivion
- Spinoff of: Golgotha
- Members: Dax Riggs; Sammy Duet; Mike Sanchez
- Past members: Audie Pitre; Joseph Fontenot; Jimmy Kyle; Tommy Viator
- Website: acidbathofficial.com

Acid Bath is an American sludge metal band from Houma, Louisiana, that was active from 1991 to 1997. Regarded as one of the first and most influential sludge metal bands, they combined a doom metal foundation with elements of hardcore punk, death metal, gothic rock, blues, grunge, and Southern rock to create their sound. The band released two albums, When the Kite String Pops and Paegan Terrorism Tactics, in 1994 and 1996, respectively, but broke up following the death of bassist Audie Pitre in a January 1997 traffic collision. They announced a reunion in October 2024.

== History ==
=== Initial career (1991–1997) ===
Dark Karnival in 1991

Golgotha in 1991

Acid Bath formed in 1991. The band was based south of New Orleans in several small towns including Houma, Thibodaux, Morgan City, and Galliano. The band got the name from a different band who had just split up. Acid Bath was an incarnation of two bands, Dark Karnival which featured Audie Pitre, Sammy Pierre Duet, and Tommy Viator, and Golgotha which featured Dax Riggs, Mike Sanchez, Jimmy Kyle, and Jerry "Boon" Businelli. Golgotha's former bassists were in frequent rotation finally culminating with Chad Pierce, who was succeeded by Pitre during Acid Bath's formation. Tommy Viator was later replaced by Jimmy Kyle on drums but returned to play keyboards toward the end of the band's career. Joseph J. Fontenot was the bassist for a short time.

The band made weekend trips to the city to play late-night shows, some of which did not see the band taking the stage until 3 a.m. According to Sammy Duet: "There’s a very dark vibe [t]here. The first settlers used it as a penal colony. Southern Louisiana is where they’d stick their murderers, their rapists and their mentally ill. It all seeped into the soil." During this time, the band became acquainted with fellow New Orleans sludge bands Eyehategod and Crowbar.

At some point during this period, Roadrunner Records sent a representative to one of their shows in New Orleans. According to Dax, "Word got out and the fans all went berserk. [...] It was a trainwreck." The concertgoers "completely destroyed" the venue in which the show was being held. According to Riggs, a waitress employed at the venue suffered a broken leg during the incident. Acid Bath did not get the record deal.

Influenced by thrash metal as well as bands and artists such as Black Sabbath, Alice Cooper, Celtic Frost, Carcass, and Darkthrone, Acid Bath recorded their demo Hymns of the Needle Freak with their manager and producer Keith Falgout in 1993. The strength of the demo earned them a deal. They released When the Kite String Pops on the Rotten Records label produced by Spike Cassidy in 1994, followed two years later by their second and final effort, Paegan Terrorism Tactics (also produced by Keith Falgout and also on the Rotten Records label). Neither gained them mainstream success, but both albums earned substantial underground acclaim. In 2005, another album composed of their demos, Demos: 1993–1996, was released by Rotten Records.

The last show the original lineup of Acid Bath performed took place at the Shreveport Municipal Auditorium on April 25, 1997. Crowbar, Floodgate, and Dead Industry were also on the bill. Jeromy Boullion played guitar for Acid Bath instead of Mike Sanchez. Acid Bath did not get paid because the show was not promoted properly and not enough people attended.

=== Break-up and subsequent projects (1997–2024) ===
After two studio albums, Acid Bath's career abruptly ended on January 23, 1997, when bass guitarist Audie Pitre and his parents were killed by a drunk driver who had run a stop sign. Kelly Pitre, Audie's brother, was the only one of four family members to survive the incident, escaping with only a broken rib and a mild neck fracture.

While rumors of another album circulated after the band's end, nothing new surfaced. Sammy Duet owns a tape of him and Mike Sanchez coming up with riffs for a possible third Acid Bath album. He mentioned this tape on his interview with Does It Doom?. The tape was labeled "Rat Poison" because neither of them could come up with an album name. One of the members saw some rat poison in a box at the rehearsal space and said "just call it fucking Rat Poison". It was also rumored that some of the riffs were used for the first Goatwhore album; however, this was proven to be false.

Tommy Viator played drums on Disincarnate's album Dreams of the Carrion Kind with the well-known death metal guitarist James Murphy. Dax Riggs and Mike Sanchez went on to perform in the band Agents of Oblivion, releasing one self-titled album in 2000 and disbanding shortly thereafter. Starting in 2000, Riggs was also the frontman for the swamp rock band Deadboy & the Elephantmen, before he began releasing material under his own name in 2007. Sammy Pierre Duet was once a member of Crowbar, but has since left the band. He is now a member of the blackened death metal band Goatwhore and Ritual Killer and his doom metal band with Kelly Pitre (the brother of Audie) Vual. Sammy Duet has remained an open satanist since his days in Acid Bath. Audie formed a metal band in 1995, blending black metal vocals with the heavy sound of multiple bassists with no guitars, known as Shrüm. Tommy Viator and Joseph Fontenot were also members of Shrüm. Shrüm utilized two distorted low-end basses, and Fontenot alternated between playing a distorted high-end bass and a clean bass. Fontenot later played bass for Devourment for two years. Joseph Fontenot is now a drill sergeant in the U.S. Army.

In 2014, rumors started that Acid Bath were reuniting with a new vocalist because Jimmy Kyle reached out to vocalist of Slipknot, Corey Taylor, with a vague message stating "Acid Bath is in search of a vocalist. Please send Mp3, demo, videos or any music links performing Acid Bath songs." However, these rumors were dismissed by other band members stating that "There is no ACID BATH without [late bassist] Audie Pitre, so there will never be 'new' ACID BATH material", and that "Currently, most of the surviving members of ACID BATH — Jimmy, Mike, and myself — have been considering the possibility of doing some shows in the future, as an ACID BATH tribute band, but nothing has been set in stone, and it is still just an idea."

=== Reunion (2024–present) ===
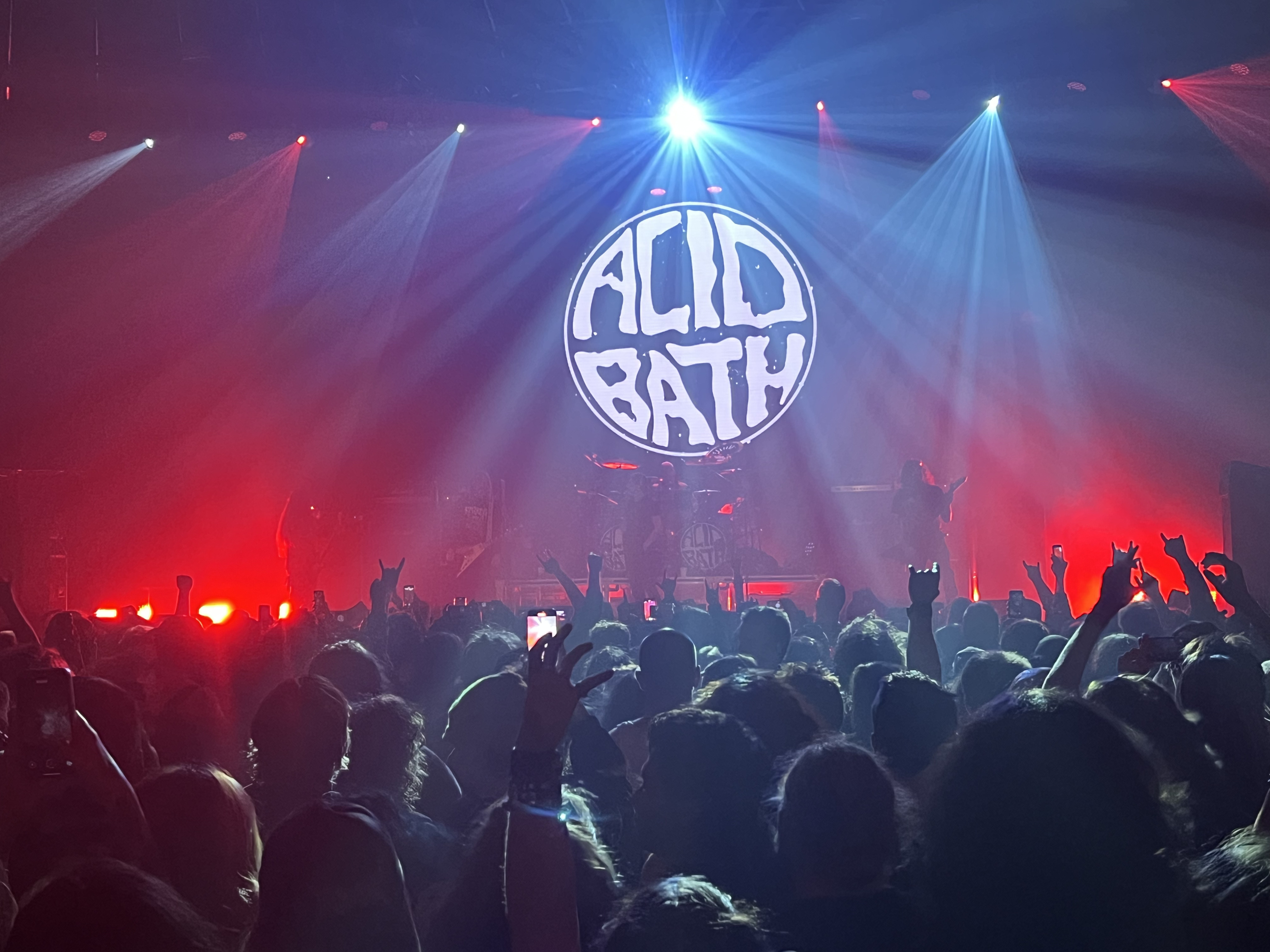
An Acid Bath reunion show at the REBEL in Toronto in October 2025.

On October 15, 2024, a one-off reunion show was announced at the Sick New World festival in Las Vegas that was to take place on April 12, 2025, what would be the band's first show in 28 years. The festival was canceled a month later. In the following weeks after the reunion announcement, more festival dates were added, including the Sonic Temple festival in Columbus, Ohio, on May 9, 2025, and Louder Than Life festival in Louisville, Kentucky, on September 18. Concerts were also announced in New Orleans (April 25 and April 30), Los Angeles, Brooklyn, Chicago, St Petersburg, Des Moines, Seattle, Portland, and Oakland. The band is scheduled to perform at Milwaukee Metal Fest in June 2026 as well. Additionally, a European tour supporting System of a Down and Queens of the Stone Age was announced on September 10 for summer 2026.

Along with returning original members (Riggs, Duet, and Sanchez), Zack Simmons (Goatwhore) and Alex Bergeron (ex-Agents of Oblivion) were announced on drums and bass respectively. Shane Wesley (Crowbar) was ultimately chosen to play bass.

== Musical style ==
The Blue
The Blue is the opening song from When The Kite String Pops

Acid Bath is best known for blending extreme, death metal-influenced sludge metal with a mixture of death growls and melancholic goth/grunge-style vocals and acoustic guitar passages, as well as use of sampling and spoken word poetry. AllMusic has called the band's sound "difficult to pigeonhole" and described it as "a blend of Black Sabbath-like sludge, bluesy Southern rock, death metal, hardcore, and hints of goth and industrial". In a Pit Magazine interview, vocalist Dax Riggs classified their sound as "death rock". In another interview, guitarist Sammy Duet described their sound as "gothic hardcore".

The band sampled sound clips from controversial movies including Blue Velvet and A Clockwork Orange. Dax Riggs' vocals were processed, which produced an industrial feel; some other instruments have been processed through industrial effects in their recordings (such as the snare drum on the second half of "New Death Sensation"). One of Acid Bath's trademarks was working multiple tempo changes into the song structure. Their experimentation drifted into diverse territory. The song "Scream of the Butterfly" is an acoustic blues song with double bass drum patterns toward the end. "The Bones of Baby Dolls" experiments with folk musicianship, and "Dead Girl" was described as a country song by Dax Riggs.

Dax Riggs' lyrics are frequently poetic, often displaying an obsession with death, drug use, mental illness, dark humor, Louisiana-based regional culture, and continuous references to animism, paganism, nihilism, and misanthropy. He has claimed these inspirations are culled from comic books, namely those authored by Frank Miller, Alan Moore, and Clive Barker, and has also expressed admiration for ANSWER Me! and Boiled Angel. AllMusic's William York has stated that the song "Venus Blue" could have been a radio hit "if not for the graphic lyrics". Another facet of their presentation which may not have endeared them to popular sentiment was the use of art by John Wayne Gacy and Dr. Jack Kevorkian. Due to the controversy surrounding Kevorkian's artwork For He Is Raised on the album, Paegan Terrorism Tactics was initially banned from Australia. The ban has since been lifted. The cover of the band's 1994 extended play simply entitled Edits featured the artwork of Richard Ramirez. The cover of their 1996 compilation Radio Edits featured the artwork of Kenneth Bianchi.

== Legacy ==
Despite only releasing two albums, as well as a number of radio edits and an official bootleg DVD, Acid Bath gained a strong underground following (especially in Louisiana) owing to the unique, experimental nature of their music. They have been cited as an influence on Slipknot's self-titled debut.

== Members ==
=== Current members ===
- Dax Riggs – lead vocals (1991–1997, 2024–present)
- Sammy "Pierre" Duet – guitars, backing vocals (1991–1997, 2024–present)
- Mike "Edison" Sanchez – guitars (1991–1997, 2024–present)

=== Current live members ===
- Shane Wesley – bass (2024–present)
- Zack Simmons – drums (2024–present)

=== Former members ===
- Jimmy Kyle – drums (1991–1997)
- Audie Pitre – bass, backing vocals (1991–1997; died 1997)
- Joseph Fontenot – bass (1997)
- Tomas Viator – keyboards (1996–1997; died 2024)

=== Former live members ===
- Jeromy Boullion – guitar (1997)

Timeline

== Discography ==
=== Studio albums ===
- When the Kite String Pops (1994) Rotten Records
- Paegan Terrorism Tactics (1996) Rotten Records

=== Demos ===
- Silent Screams (Dark Karnival demo) (1988)
- Wet Dreams of the Insane(Golgotha demo) (1991)
- Screams of the Butterfly (1992)
- Demo II (1993)
- Untitled demo tape (Hymns of the Needle Freak) (1993)
- Paegan Terrorism Tactics Outtakes (1996)

=== Compilation albums ===
- Demos: 1993–1996 (2005) Rotten Records

=== EPs ===
- KLSU Radio Demo (Golgotha radio EP) (1991)

=== Remix albums ===
- Radio Edits 1 (1994)
- Radio Edits 2 (1996)

=== Videos ===
- Liquid Death Bootleg (1993)
- Apocalyptic Sunshine Bootleg (1994)
- "Toubabo Koomi" (1994) Rotten Records promo clip
- Double Live Bootleg! DVD (2002) Rotten Records
