= List of drowning victims =

This is a list of drowning victims in chronological order. The reasons for drowning are diverse and range from suicide, to accidents or murders.

== Antiquity ==
- Tiberinus Silvius, ninth Latin king of Alba Longa, drowned in the Tiber, which was named after him.
- Hippasus of Metapontum, a student of the mathematician Pythagoras, who, by some accounts, was drowned by his fellow Pythagoreans for the imprudence of discovering irrational numbers.
- Qu Yuan of China in 278 BC. Committed ritual suicide as a form of protest against the corruption of the era, a sacrifice still commemorated today during the Duan Wu or Dragon Boat Festival.
- Pharaoh Ptolemy XIII of Egypt, drowned in the Nile in 47 BC.
- Antinous (born circa 111), lover of Roman Emperor Hadrian, drowned in the Nile in 130; the grieving emperor commissioned hundreds of statues of the youth and spread them around the Empire.
- Cao E, a Han dynasty girl venerated for her filial piety. In 143, Cao Xu accidentally fell into the Shun River. in an act of filial piety, she decided to find her father in the river. After five days, she and her father were both found dead in the river from drowning. Eight years later, a temple was built in Shangyu dedicated to the memory of Cao E and her sacrifice for filial piety. The Shun River was renamed Cao'e River in her honor.
- Maxentius, Roman Emperor, drowned in the Tiber during the chaos of the Battle of the Milvian Bridge on October 28, 312.
- Yuan Zhao, briefly an emperor of the Northern Wei, thrown together with Empress Dowager Hu into the Yellow River to drown
- Shabib ibn Yazid al-Shaybani, (697/98), a rebel in Umayyad Caliphate, was defeated by Umayyad Army. As he attempted to escape his Syrian pursuers (the Umayyad army), he drowned in the Dujayl Canal while trying to cross it. This occurred either in early 697 or in 697/98.
- Li Bai, Chinese poet, in 762. It is, however, suggested that he died of excessive drinking or mercury poisoning.

== Middle Ages ==
- William Adelin (born 1103) and his half-sister Matilda FitzEdith, countess of Perches (born circa 1090), children of King Henry I of England, drowned in the Channel on 25 November 1120 in the White Ship wreck.
- Kilij Arslan died trying to escape across the Khabur river, having lost the battle that took place near the river.
- Empress Zhu is believed to have committed suicide by drowning herself in 1127 after the Jingkang Incident because she was a victim of sexual abuse.
- Taira no Koremori is believed to have committed suicide on May 10, 1184, after defeated at the Battle of Kurikara.
- Emperor Antoku, Taira no Tokiko, Tomomori, Noritsune and many other members of the Taira clan committed suicide on April 25, 1185, after defeated at the Battle of Dan-no-ura.
- Friedrich I Barbarossa, Duke of Swabia and Holy Roman Emperor, drowned in the Göksu River (Cilicia) on 6 June 1190 during the Third Crusade, leaving an unstable alliance between Richard I of England and Philip II of France.
- Henry of Antioch, the son of Bohemund IV of Antioch, drowned at sea in June 1276.
- King Magnus IV of Sweden and Norway in shipping accident (as Magnus VII), 1316 – 1374.
- Zhao Bing and Lu Xiufu committed suicide after defeated at Battle of Yamen, and Southern Song fell, on March 19, 1279.
- Saint John of Nepomuk, martyred by drowning in 1393.

== Renaissance ==
- Henry Holland, 3rd Duke of Exeter, Constable of the Tower of London, 1430 – 1475. He fell overboard a ship and his body was found in the English Channel
- George, Duke of Clarence (born 1449), executed for treason against his brother king Edward IV of England on 1478, by drowning in a barrel of Malmsey wine; or so the legend says, because modern assessments favour the traditional decapitation instead
- Bartolomeu Dias, a Portuguese explorer who sailed around the Cape of Good Hope. Drowned not far from the Cape of Good Hope in 1500
- King Louis II of Hungary in the Csele Brook, on escape from the catastrophic Battle of Mohács (1526). Heavy cavalry armor impeded his ability to swim.
- Felix Manz, co-founder of the Swiss Anabaptists, was drowned in 1527 in the Limmat in Zürich by the Zürich Reformed state church
- Robert Parsons, English composer, fell into the then swollen River Trent at Newark-on-Trent in Nottinghamshire and was drowned.
- Francisco Rodrigues Lobo (b. 1580), a Portuguese poet and writer of Sephardi Jewish origin, drowned on 4 November 1621
- Alexander Whitaker, the "Apostle of Virginia" drowned while fording the James River in Virginia. He was the first English-speaking Clergyman in the New World.

== 18th century ==
- John William Friso of Orange-Nassau, stadholder of the Low Countries, in 1711 when a ferry boat overturned in bad weather.
- Miguel de Bragança (b. 1699), bastard son of King Peter II of Portugal, in the Tagus River on 13 January 1724
- Peter Artedi, a disciple of Linnaeus, considered the father of Ichthyology, fell by accident in a channel of Amsterdam in 1735
- 172 passengers of shipwrecked vessel Le Saint Géran at Île D'Ambre off the coast of Isle de France (Mauritius) on 18 August 1744.

== 19th century ==
- Percy Bysshe Shelley, influential English Romantic poet, in a sudden storm while sailing off Livorno on 8 July 1822.
- Charles Clement Johnston, U.S. Representative from Virginia, drowned in the Potomac River near Alexandria, Virginia in 1832.
- Lucas Barrett, English naturalist and geologist in 1862.
- Gonçalves Dias, a Brazilian Romantic poet, playwright, ethnographer, lawyer and linguist, in 1864.
- Constantine W. Buckley, former Speaker of the Texas House of Representatives, drowned in the Brazos River near Columbia, Texas on 19 December 1865.
- Digby Mackworth Dolben (born 1848), poet and friend of Gerard Manley Hopkins, drowned on 28 June 1867 in the River Welland when bathing with the ten-year-old son of his tutor.
- William Collinson Sawyer 1st Bishop of Grafton and Armidale died on Sunday, 15 March 1868 when the boat he was travelling in sank on the Clarence River.
- Richard Kirwan, English cricketer and Anglican clergyman, drowned while bathing in the sea off Sidmouth on 2 September 1872.
- Julius Krohn (b. 1835), founder of the scientific study of folklore, and influential journalist, author and translator. Ethnically German but active in Finland. Drowned in a freak sailing accident in 1888.
- L'Inconnue de la Seine, an unknown woman allegedly found dead in the river Seine in the late 1880s. Her death mask was reproduced and displayed in artists' studios.

== 20th century ==
=== 1900s ===
- Consort Zhen (born 1876), consort of Guangxu Emperor, thrown into a well by Empress Dowager Cixi, August 15, 1900.
- Isadore Rush (born ?), American actress. Drowned off the beach at San Diego, Hotel Del Coronado November 1904.
- Grace Brown (born 1886), American garment industry worker. She drowned in New York's Big Moose Lake on June 11, 1906, after she fell out of a boat being rowed by her boyfriend, Chester Gillette, nephew of her employer. Witnesses said Gillette had struck her on the head with a tennis racket before she went into the water; he claimed she had jumped out. After a murder trial that drew national attention, Gillette was convicted and sentenced to death; he was executed two years later. The case inspired Theodore Dreiser's novel An American Tragedy.
- Ernst Schultz (born 1879), Danish sprinter. Drowned while swimming in Roskilde Fjord, 20 June 1906.

=== 1910s ===
- Sir W. S. Gilbert (b. 1836), British humorist, librettist of the Gilbert and Sullivan operas, drowned on 29 May 1911 while going to the rescue of two other swimmers in the lake at his home. He may have died from a heart attack rather than by drowning.
- Michel Tamarati (born 1858), a Georgian Catholic priest and historian, died while trying to rescue a drowning man in a stormy sea near Santa Marinella, Italy, on September 16, 1911.
- John Jacob Astor IV (born 1864) drowned in the Titanic disaster in 1912.
- Benjamin Guggenheim (born 1865) drowned in the Titanic disaster in 1912.
- Isidor Straus and wife Ida Straus, drowned in the Titanic disaster.
- Herbert Kitchener, 1st Earl Kitchener (born 1850), British field marshal, presumed to have drowned after HMS Hampshire hit a mine and sank off the Orkney Islands in 1916.
- Grigori Rasputin (died 1916), Russian mystic and Imperial adviser. The aristocratic faction tried to kill him using several methods, including, after poison, several gunshots; this is believed to be the main cause of his death, but after his body was thrown in the Neva River (and later recovered), many tend to believe that drowning was the final cause of his death. For others, attributing death to drowning means adding to a legend.
- Enrique Granados drowned after jumping out of a lifeboat to rescue his wife following the torpedoing of their ship by the German navy during World War I in 1916.
- Tom Thomson, Canadian painter who died in a canoeing accident in Algonquin Provincial Park in 1917.

=== 1920s ===
- William Wilton (born 1865), Scottish football manager (Rangers F.C.), drowned in a boating accident at Gourock, Scotland in 1920.
- Little Lord Fauntleroy (murder victim), an unidentified child found in Waukesha, Wisconsin, on March 8, 1921. He had been hit in the head with a blunt instrument and was thrown into a quarry, which resulted in his death.
- Michael Llewelyn Davies (born 1900) and his friend Rupert Buxton drowned together in a pool of water downstream of a weir near Sandford Lock on the River Thames, a few miles from Oxford on May 21, 1921. The location has been the site of many drownings.
- Pavel Urysohn (born 1898), Russian mathematician and topologist, drowned on 17 August 1924 while on holiday in France.
- Sacadura Cabral died on 15 November 1924 after his airplane disappeared over the English Channel, along with his co-pilot Mechanical Corporal José Correia. As no bodies were found, it is not known whether they actually drowned.
- Ida Vihuri (born 1882), Finnish politician, died on 7 September 1929 in the shipwreck of SS Kuru.

=== 1930s ===
- J. W. H. T. Douglas, (1882–1930), cricketer, died unsuccessfully trying to rescue his father after a collision at sea.
- Starr Faithfull (1906–1931), American socialite, drowned near Long Beach, New York in June 1931; whether her death was homicide, suicide or accident was never determined.
- Bertie Johnston, Australian politician, drowned at Black Rock, Victoria in 1932.
- Hart Crane, poet; suicide in the Caribbean in April 1932.
- Eugene James (1913–1933), Kentucky Derby-winning American jockey drowned in Lake Michigan while swimming at Chicago's Oak Street Beach.
- Oskar Kumpu (1889–1935), Finnish Olympic wrestler and Red Army officer, drowned while swimming in the Olonka River in the Soviet Union.
- Jiro Sato (1908–1934), Japanese tennis player, committed suicide in the Strait of Malacca on April 5, 1934.
- James Murray, (1901–1936), actor, found drowned in the Hudson River, possible suicide.
- Alfonsina Storni, (1892–1935), Argentine poet, committed suicide in Mar del Plata, Argentina.
- Michalina Isaakowa (1880–1937), Polish amateur entomologist, traveler and writer drowned in Peru.

=== 1940s ===
- Virginia Woolf (born 1882), British writer, committed suicide on 28 March 1941.
- Glenn Miller (born 1904), American big band conductor, arranger, composer, trombonist, and recording artist before and during World War II, went missing in action (MIA) on December 15, 1944, on a flight over the English Channel from England to France.
- Osamu Dazai (born 1909), Japanese writer, committed shinjū in the Tamagawa Aqueduct on June 13, 1948.

=== 1950s ===
- Arky Vaughan (born 1912), baseball Hall of Famer, drowned after falling from his fishing boat on 30 August 1952.
- Susan Martin (1945–1958) and Virginia Martin (1947–1958) died by drowning in the Columbia River in unexplained circumstances when they, along with their mother, father, and older sister, disappeared in December 1958.

=== 1960s ===
- Victor Prather (born 1926), U.S. Navy flight surgeon, drowned on May 4, 1961, after the landing of the Strato-Lab V balloon flight, which set a new manned balloon altitude record.
- David Kenyon Webster of the 101st Airborne Division (Band of Brothers) was lost at sea, September 9, 1961, while shark fishing. Presumed drowned.
- Klara Dan von Neumann (born 1911), pioneer in computer science, drowned on 10 November 1963 in La Jolla, California.
- Johnny Burnette, pop singer known for hits such as "You're Sixteen", drowned after a boating accident on August 14, 1964.
- On 9 July 1964: drowning of 8 members of para-military branch Special Mobile Force (SMF) at Bras D’Eau, Poste Lafayette in Mauritius (Sergeant Nadal, constables Célestin, Sandoo, Bazire, Dahary, Dornford, Virasamy and civilian Hervé Couronne).
- Hugo Ärnfast (born 1908), Swedish diplomat, died in a drowning accident near Bogotá on 11 July 1965, after being swept away by strong currents while on a trip to a mountain village.
- Lao She (born 1899), Chinese novelist and dramatist. Experienced mistreatment when the Cultural Revolution began in 1966, committed suicide by drowning himself in Beijing's Taiping Lake on 24 August 1966.
- Prince Frederick of Prussia (born 1911), died in 1966 at Reinhartshausen, Germany, after drowning in the Rhine.
- Eric Fleming, actor best known for his role in the CBS series Rawhide, drowned on 28 September 1966, in a remote river in Peru's back country while filming the made-for-TV movie "Selva Alta" ("High Jungle") for MGM.
- Harold Holt, serving Prime Minister of Australia, presumed to have drowned on 17 December 1967.
- Brian Jones (born 1942), original guitarist of The Rolling Stones, drowned in Hartfield, Sussex, England, in his own swimming pool on 3 July 1969. Classified as "death by misadventure".
- Mary Jo Kopechne (born 1940), drowned in Ted Kennedy's Oldsmobile Delta 88 in a car accident off of Chappaquiddick Island in mid-July 1969.

=== 1970s ===
- Albert Ayler, jazz musician, suspected suicide November 1970.
- George Duncan (born 1930), Australian law lecturer, drowned in Adelaide's River Torrens after being thrown in by a group of men believed to have been police officers charged with enforcing vice laws, particularly gay cruising on the riverbanks. No suspects have ever been identified in the case, but outrage over it led South Australia to become the first Australian state to fully decriminalize homosexuality three years later.
- Cengaver Katrancı (born 1964), a Turkish boy, who lived in West Berlin. He is one of the youngest victims of the Berlin Wall's existence. Drowned in the Spree on October 30, 1972.
- István Kertész, orchestral conductor, accident, 16 April 1973.
- Ann Quin, British experimental author. Drowned 1973, open verdict.
- Horatio Strother (born 1930), American historian and educator who accidentally drowned while swimming in Hidden Lake in Haddam, Connecticut, in 1974.
- Josef Mengele (born 1911), war criminal and leader of the Nazi human experimentation programme, drowned while swimming off the Brazilian coast in 1979.

=== 1980s ===
- John Crabbe Cunningham (born 1927), Scottish climber, mountain instructor and member of the Creag Dhu mountaineering club, drowned at South Stack, Anglesey, Wales in January 1980, when attempting to rescue a female pupil who fell into the sea while Coasteering
- Natalie Wood (born 1938), actress, drowned in a yachting accident in 1981 off of Santa Catalina Island; the accident raised several suspicions and murder was considered and the case was reopened in 2011 and is now categorized as suspicious with husband Robert Wagner named as a person of interest.
- Joe Delaney (born 1958), Running back for the Kansas City Chiefs, accidentally drowned in 1983 while trying to save three children who were screaming for help.
- Dennis Wilson (born 1944), one of the members of the Beach Boys, drowned in 1983 at Marina del Rey, California, while diving after drinking.
- Jessica Savitch (born 1947), NBC and PBS news broadcaster and reporter, drowned in 1983 when the car in which she was riding went off the road during a heavy rainstorm into a canal, sank upside down in mud and filled with water.
- Grégory Villemin (born 1980), French child, was found drowned, bound and gagged in France's Vologne River 7 kilometres (4.3 mi) from his home in Lépanges-sur-Vologne on October 16, 1984. It was later found that the water in his lungs did not match the river, suggesting he had been killed elsewhere. The ensuing homicide investigation and trials captivated the country; no one has been convicted in the case.
- Hans Neij (born 1921), a Swedish Air Force major general serving as defence attaché in Washington, D.C. and Ottawa drowned during a holiday stay at Fort Walton Beach, Florida on 24 April 1985.
- Fernando Pereira, Dutch photographer drowned when French agents sank the Greenpeace ship Rainbow Warrior, July 10, 1985.
- Carol Wayne, American actress who drowned under mysterious circumstances in Manzanillo, Mexico in 1985.
- Uwe Barschel, German politician who was found dead under mysterious circumstances on 11 October 1987 when his clothed body was discovered in a full bathtub at Hotel Beau-Rivage in Geneva.
- Jerry Anderson, former NFL football player who drowned while saving a boy who had fallen into a flooded creek in 1989.

=== 1990s ===
- Jim Hodder, (born 1947), American drummer who drowned in his pool in 1990.
- Robert Maxwell, newspaper magnate, disappeared from his yacht under mysterious circumstances in 1991, body later recovered off the coast of Tenerife, Canary Islands.
- Will Sinnott, bass player and keyboardist for The Shamen, who drowned while swimming in the Canary Islands in 1991.
- Kiyoshi Nishimura, Japanese filmmaker, committed suicide on November 17, 1993.
- Tom Mees, longtime sportscaster for ESPN, drowned while trying to rescue his 4-year-old daughter in a neighbor's swimming pool, in 1996. The daughter survived.
- David Chan Yuk-cheung (Chinese: 陈毓祥, born 1950), a leader of Baodiao movement in Hong Kong, drowned in the sea during a protest in 1996.
- Jeff Buckley (born 1966), singer-songwriter, drowned in the Wolf River in Memphis, Tennessee in 1997.
- Mae Boren Axton, songwriter known as "The Queen Mother of Nashville" and mother of singer Hoyt Axton, drowned in her hot tub at her home in Hendersonville, Tennessee, in 1997, after an apparent heart attack.
- Nerine Kidd Shatner (Born July 13, 1959) actress/model and the third wife of William Shatner drowned while swimming alone in the couple's pool.

== 21st century ==
=== 2000s ===
- Linda Andersen (born 1959), forcibly drowned in her bathtub by her two daughters in Mississauga, Ontario, on January 18, 2003.
- Riley Fox (born 2001), American child, was found drowned in a creek near Wilmington, Illinois on June 6, 2004, shortly after she had been reported missing. Her father was initially suspected of killing her and spent eight months in jail before evidence cleared him and charges were dropped; he would later successfully sue the local sheriff's office for violations of his civil rights. A paroled convict living nearby was later convicted after his own confession and sentenced to life without parole. He later died in prison.
- Spalding Gray (born 1941), monologuist and actor (Swimming to Cambodia), drowned in a suspected suicide in New York City's East River in 2004.
- Geetha Angara (born 1961), drowned in a water tank at a treatment plant where she worked as a chemist in Totowa, New Jersey, on February 8, 2005. Although the possibility has been raised that the drowning was accidental, police are investigating the death as a homicide, either by intent or negligence, but as of 2015 no suspects had been identified.
- Tom Rogers (born 1918), creator of Charlie the Tuna for StarKist, drowned in his son's swimming pool while swimming alone, in Charlottesville, VA on June 24, 2005. He was 87 years old.
- Wim Duisenberg (born 1935), Dutch banker who later became the first president of the European Central Bank, drowned in his swimming pool at Faucon in eastern France, on October 31, 2005. He may have died of a heart attack rather than by drowning.
- Édouard Michelin (born 1963), French businessman, drowned while fishing near the island of Sein in northwest France, in 2006.
- Barbara Precht, pulled from the Ohio River on 29 November 2006. Her body was not identified until November 2014. She died from drowning due to unknown circumstances.
- Rafael Donato (born 1938), distinguished Filipino educator and university president, accidentally drowned off the coast of Morong, Bataan, in the Philippines in 2006.
- Marquise Hill (born 1982), Defensive End for the New England Patriots, accidentally drowned in Lake Pontchartrain in New Orleans after a jet ski accident on 27 May 2007.
- Jeremy Blake (born 1971), American digital artist and painter, drowned on or around July 17, 2007 in the Atlantic Ocean in an apparent suicide (although some suspect he was murdered by Scientologists) after being reported missing off Rockaway Beach, Queens, New York. His body was found in the water off Sea Girt, New Jersey on July 22, 2007.
- Kari Blackburn (born 1954), BBC World Service executive, drowned (suicide) at sea at Felixstowe, Suffolk, England in 2007.
- Katoucha Niane (born 1960), French model, drowned in the Seine in 2008.
- Pit Martin (born 1943), Canadian ice hockey player, drowned after his snowmobile fell through thin ice in Quebec in 2008.
- Ophélie Bretnacher, a French student, drowned in the Danube between December 2008 and February 2009.

=== 2010s ===
- Dawn Brancheau, SeaWorld trainer, killed during a killer whale show and suffered a blunt trauma on February 24, 2010.
- Toshiharu Ikeda, Japanese film director and screenwriter, committed suicide in December 2010.
- Marie-France Pisier, French actress, found dead in her swimming pool April 2011.
- Nandana, the 8-year-old daughter of Indian singer K. S. Chithra, drowned after falling into a swimming pool in Dubai, April 2011.
- Whitney Houston, American singer, found dead in her bathtub following a barbiturate overdose, February 2012.
- Rodney King, American construction worker, victim of police brutality, found dead in his swimming pool with alcohol, marijuana and cocaine in his system, June 2012.
- Elisa Lam (born 1991), Canadian tourist in Los Angeles, found in the water tank atop the hotel where she was staying on February 19, 2013.
- David Bird, American journalist, found in a river near his home 14 months after he was last seen alive in early 2014.
- Alan Kurdi (born 2012), Syrian child, drowned in the Mediterranean off the Turkish coast on September 2, 2015, while his family was trying to enter Greece and seek refugee status from their country's civil war. A photograph of Kurdi's body lying lifeless on the shore sparked global outrage over the plight of Syrian refugees.
- Santiago Maldonado, drowned while trying to cross río Chubut while escaping from the federal law enforcement.
- Sally Brampton, English journalist, writer and magazine editor, committed suicide by walking into the sea at St Leonards on 10 May 2016.
- Maria Ladenburger, died of drowning in the German river Dreisam on October 16, 2016, after being sexually assaulted.
- Vladimir Cvijan, died of drowning in the Danube in Belgrade, Serbia on 5 January 2018. His death was kept hidden from the public for 3 years, until it was revealed in March 2021.
- Dolores O’Riordan, Irish musician and vocalist for the Cranberries died of drowning caused by alcohol poisoning in her bathtub at the London Hilton on Park Lane hotel on 15 January 2018.
- Sridevi, veteran Indian actress, died aged 54 on 24 February 2018 after drowning in the bathtub of her room in a hotel in Dubai, where she had gone to attend a marriage. Initially, the cause of her death was known as a heart attack, but it was later confirmed to be drowning. It is believed that she was under the influence of alcohol when she died.
- Eric Geboers, age 55, a 5-time Belgian world champion motocross racer, died on 6 May 2018, while trying to save his drowning dog.
- Ray Emery, Canadian ice hockey goaltender, drowned in Hamilton Harbour on July 15, 2018.
- Florijana Ismaili, Swiss Footballer, drowned in Lake Como in July 2019.
- Chan Yin-lam (born 2004), drowned in the ocean off Hong Kong September 19, 2019. Her death was ruled a suicide; conspiracy theories circulated that she had actually been killed by the police over her participation in the ongoing protests.

=== 2020s ===
- On May 17, 2020, Shad Gaspard and his son were among a group of swimmers caught in a strong rip current in the Venice Beach neighborhood of Los Angeles. Gaspard told the lifeguards to save his son before saving himself but disappeared underwater soon after. His son was safely rescued.
- On 8 July 2020, Alex Pullin (also known as 'Chumpy'), an Australian Olympic snowboarder, drowned after a spearfishing accident at Palm Beach, Gold Coast in Queensland, Australia.
- Also on 8 July 2020, actress and singer Naya Rivera drowned in Lake Piru, Ventura County, California, after saving her son. After being declared a missing person and a subsequent search and rescue mission, her body was found on 13 July 2020.
- On 26 November 2021, the Norwegian YouTuber Apetor drowned at Jakobs dam, a lake west of Kongsberg, Norway. He was rescued by divers and flown by air ambulance to Ullevål University Hospital in Oslo, though he was unable to be resuscitated and died on the 27th.
- On June 26, 2022, American actress Mary Mara drowned in Cape Vincent, New York while swimming in the St. Lawrence River.
- On November 5, 2022, American singer Aaron Carter drowned in a bathtub at his California home after inhaling difluoroethane and taking alprazolam.
- On October 28, 2023, American actor Matthew Perry died of an apparent drowning in his hot tub at his Pacific Palisades home at the age of 54.
- On July 1, 2025, British Labour politician David Lipsey, Baron Lipsey died while swimming in the River Wye in Wales.
- On July 20, 2025, American actor Malcolm-Jamal Warner died while swimming off the Caribbean coast of Costa Rica.
- On September 19, 2025, Indian singer and actor Zubeen Garg drowned while on his trip to Singapore.
- On June 8, 2026, basketball players Divine Adili and Rene Baterbonia drowned during a team building activity off the coast of Dipaculao, Philippines.

== See also ==
- List of shipwrecks
