= Killing of Geetha Angara =

Unsolved 2005 homicide in New Jersey, US

- Undated photo of Angara
- Date: February 8, 2005
- Time: 10:30–11 a.m.
- Location: Totowa, New Jersey, U.S.; 40.8834°N 74.2274°W
- Cause: Drowning

On the afternoon of February 9, 2005, the body of 43-year-old Geetha Angara (born July 15, 1961) a chemist, was found in a water tank at the Passaic Valley Water Commission treatment facility in Totowa, New Jersey, United States, after the tanks had been drained. She had not been seen since the previous morning when she had gone to the water tanks to take samples; items she had been carrying when she was last seen alive were also found. The items— a radio and broken beaker— were found in the water, below an access panel that was slightly ajar. Broken glass was found on the floor near that panel.

An autopsy found bruises on Angara's neck consistent with choking, as well as on her waist and elbows, suggesting she had been involved in a violent struggle, but not a deadly one. The cause of death was determined to be drowning, as she was alive when she had gone into the water. Investigators classified the case as a homicide, believing the killing had been intentional; they put Angara's death as having occurred the day before.

Since access to the plant was tightly controlled, police believed that the responsible party was someone else in the plant that day. After interviewing all of Angara's coworkers over the next few months, detectives found some possible motives and narrowed a list of possible suspects down to eight men. Three were ultimately considered suspects, but after further investigation the case went cold, and as of 2020 they have not been publicly identified and no arrests have been made.

Investigators have also considered the possibility that the death was purely accidental, based on the work of a Scottish pathologist who argues that injuries very similar to those associated with strangulation can occur as victims drown in very cold water such as that Angara was found in—the theory is that the plate over the tank might negligently have been left open following some sample collection for water testing. Struck by similarities with a 1968 killing of a woman, also in Passaic County, alone while in a high-security industrial complex on a weekend, they looked for leads in that case's file. In 2007, Angara's family, frustrated by the lack of progress, successfully pushed for the state's Attorney General to review the case, but that effort did not result in any new leads or information either.

== Background ==
Born in 1961 in Chennai, India, (Note: At the time known as Madras.) Angara earned bachelor's and master's degrees in chemistry from Loyola College, Chennai, the first woman in the school's history to do so. As the top student in the class, she earned a gold medal. In 1984, she emigrated to the U.S., where she earned additional master's degrees and a doctorate in organic chemistry from New York University.

Angara married another Indian émigré who worked in banking, and the couple shortly had the first of their three children, settling at first in Clifton, New Jersey, a suburb in Passaic County. After a year at Merck analyzing compounds, in 1992 Angara began working for the Passaic Valley Water Commission (PVWC), a public utility owned by Clifton and the neighboring cities of Passaic and Paterson, which provides 83 million US gal (310,000 m^{3}) of water daily to 800,000 customers in those cities and 14 other communities in that region of North Jersey. Seven years later, the family moved to Holmdel, 42 miles (68 km) to the south in Monmouth County, where they believed the school system was better.

In 2003 an episode of Law & Order: Special Victims Unit, "Brotherhood", used the PVWC plant as one of its filming locations. It centered on a coverup of lethal fraternity hazing; one scene had a character's body found floating in a tank. "Brotherhood," the show's first episode, aired in 2004.

Angara had been considering leaving the PVWC, but changed her mind after she was promoted to senior chemist of the plant and earned a plant operator's license. In that position, she took the lead in transitioning the Totowa plant from the chlorination it had been using to purify its water to an ozone-based process. She was proud of her work on that project, but some of her coworkers had resented both her promotion and the switch, her husband later recalled. Angara did not socialize much with her coworkers, other than a few she worked with closely, preferring to concentrate on her work.

In August 2004, the ozone system, to the extent it had been installed, failed briefly due to poor welding. In late January 2005, the discovery of a pinkish substance in the treated water, during a week Angara was out sick, heightened tensions in the PVWC workplace, since Angara was asked to retrain some coworkers as a result. Angara had also begun the process of applying for another license, which aroused more antipathy among those coworkers who disliked her. Another coworker later told People this attitude was at least in part racially motivated: "Ninety-eight percent of the plant is white, and not all of them like seeing immigrants do well".

== Death ==
On the morning of February 8, Angara arrived at 7:30 a.m. and worked until a 9:45 a.m. breakfast with her immediate coworkers. One, a subordinate of hers, told her that the plant's filters and clarity sensors needed to be calibrated, an assertion supported by plant records. The group left for another building shortly before 10 a.m.; Angara returned to the building where she usually worked at 10:30. Angara was carrying a clipboard, beaker, and a two-way radio. She left a sandwich on her desk, apparently intending to eat it when she returned from a task her coworkers said she had done many times without incident.

It was the last time Angara was seen alive. The subordinate who had reminded her of the need to calibrate the instruments went into the basement, noticing broken glass on the floor in one area about 15 to 20 minutes later. By 11 a.m. the subordinate was asking other workers in the lab if anyone had seen Angara.

Angara's absence would not otherwise be noticed at work until 9:20 p.m. that night, when a worker on the night shift noted that her car was still in the parking lot; another worker noticed that her sandwich was still on her desk where she had left it and her coat was still in the closet. Her coworkers returned to work from their homes to search the building for her. Repeated calls to her cell phone from her family in Holmdel, where she was supposed to give her daughter a ride to an afternoon basketball game, had gone unanswered. Workers at the plant called the Angaras to say they could not find her at the plant and it did not appear she had ever left. Before midnight, she had been reported missing to police.

Workers searching the basement found an area where one of the 4-foot-wide (120 cm), 50-pound (23 kg) aluminum floor panels that opened onto the million-gallon (3,800 m^{3}) tanks was slightly ajar, and the 12 screws which normally held it in place were broken or missing. On the floor nearby were some shards of broken glass consistent with the beaker Angara had been carrying. These were swept up and thrown away.

At 2 a.m. on February 9, PVWC officials shut the plant down so that the tank below that panel could be drained. When it was, Angara's radio and clipboard were found. Over the course of the day, the other tanks were drained. At 6:30 p.m. (Note: The New York Times gave 7:05 p.m. as the time of the body's discovery) Angara's body was found in the clear well, a different tank it had drifted into. Before refilling the tanks and restoring service, the commission issued a boil-water order to customers as a precaution; this was lifted at the end of the following day.

== Investigation ==
Angara's body was autopsied by the Passaic County coroner's office. The pathologists found that she was alive when she went into the water and reported the cause of death as drowning. Her neck, however, had deep bruises, suggesting a strangulation attempt prior to death. Other bruises on her waist and elbow suggested a struggle. Six days after Angara's death, county prosecutor James Avigliano announced that the case would be investigated as a homicide.

Detectives' case theory was that whoever had killed Angara had likely incapacitated her first (exactly how, if not just through the strangulation, has not been made public since only the killer would know that; some accounts suggest she was struck on the head, but with only bare hands), and then opened the access panel and dumped her in, then hastily replaced the panel. An alarm system that would have gone off when it detected significant displacement in the water was not functioning. (Note: According to investigators, even if it had been working, it might not have been strong enough to register the displacement from a human body falling into the water.) The tank was unlit and there was no ladder that would have allowed Angara to climb up the 5 feet (1.5 m) between the water surface and the basement floor; the 36 °F (2 °C) water itself filled the tank to a uniform depth of 35 feet (11 m) leaving no place to stand.

The circumstances made it difficult to find forensic evidence that might lead to the killer. Angara's body had been immersed for over a day, and the heavy chlorination in the water eliminated any trace evidence, such as DNA or fingerprints, that another person might have left on it or her clothing during the final struggle. The glass fragments from the beaker on the floor near the panel had been irretrievably disposed of.

Many firefighters and police officers, as well as plant workers, had walked through the putative crime scene before the body was found, leaving it severely compromised. While there were many security cameras elsewhere in the plant complex, there were none in the basement above the tanks. Loud machinery in the area where Angara was attacked would have muffled any sounds like a scream, struggle, or broken glass.

This paucity of evidence was offset by the limited pool of suspects. Access to the treatment plant complex was tightly controlled, with only one driveway and a staffed security post where all entrants had to check in, monitored by a camera (although once they had been cleared, they could move about the complex freely). Most of the property was otherwise fenced off, except for the south side on the Passaic River. Security records showed that no one was in the complex that day who had not been cleared. Of the plant's 83 other employees, 50 had come to work that day.

Police believed one of those people had killed Angara. Since the autopsy showed she had not been sexually assaulted, they ruled out that as a motive. They also dismissed any attempt to emulate the Special Victims Unit episode. Instead, after learning of the animosity some of her coworkers had for Angara, they looked to that.

Two women were widely known to have disliked Angara, but no one thought they were capable of killing her over that. Detectives found that many of her coworkers thought well of her, saying that in addition to being devoted to her work and cheerful, she was modest, asking them not to address her as "Doctor" and simply use her first name instead. Her job responsibilities as senior chemist did not include hiring or firing authority, making it unlikely that a workplace dispute could have arisen from those possibilities. Investigators began to consider the possibility that the killing was not planned and instead had arisen from either an argument or Angara witnessing something the killer did not want anyone to witness; they had also ruled out the discoloration and ozone issues as a motive, and no longer believed the displacement sensor's breakdown was a factor.

From the strength required to lift and replace the access panel, and struggle with the 5-foot-5-inch (165 cm), 175-pound (79 kg) chemist, police came to believe the killer was male (although the county coroner argued that a woman in sufficient physical condition could have done those things as well). The Passaic County prosecutor's office assigned 13 detectives to work the case; they spent 4,000 hours interviewing all the plant's employees and getting DNA samples from those who had worked there that day.

Workers did their jobs in pairs as a safety precaution while the police kept a close eye on what happened at the plant. The investigation exacerbated tensions among employees. A month after Angara was killed, two electricians started arguing about overtime. One threatened to take the other "off the grounds and smash his head in", according to police; after the latter complained, the former was suspended.

By this point, investigators had narrowed their focus to a group of eight men, finding that many of the employees had a generally favorable impression of Angara. They still had not identified what might have moved one of them to kill her. "Either there is some very powerful motive out there that someone has kept completely to themselves, or it may suggest this wasn't a planned killing", such as a confrontation that got more heated, chief assistant prosecutor John Latoracca told The New York Times.

One year after the crime, detectives had narrowed that group down to three suspects, one of whom was the coworker who had first taken note of Angara's absence after walking down to the basement. James Wood, chief homicide detective for the prosecutor's office, told The New York Post, that another suspect was in his opinion about to confess before retaining counsel and refusing to speak with police further. "None of them have solid alibis; they all had access to the place she was", Wood added. Investigators believed that the case was an instance of an impulsive act rather than a planned killing. "This killer isn't smart, just lucky", Wood said.

Police had asked all three suspects to take lie detector tests, with different results. One passed, another was inconclusive, and a third refused. Re-interviews following the lie detector tests did not produce anything. Divers looked through the tanks to see if anything had been missed. Federal and state environmental regulators reviewed the plant's records, at the request of police, for anything unusual they might have missed. By the middle of 2006, no new leads had emerged, and the case went cold, one of two out of Passaic County's 30 homicides that year that went unsolved. At the request of the Angara family, the state Attorney General's office had the state police review the case in 2007, but nothing new developed from that.

After Angara's death, the PVWC contracted for improved security, including armed guards patrolling inside and outside the plant at all hours. In 2007 the family filed a wrongful death lawsuit against the PVWC and some of its employees. They alleged that the plant had a history of safety violations and accidents, for which the state had cited it 55 times, but the commission had done nothing to correct them. After two years, a judge ordered the parties to mediation.

Ten years after the killing, when the Angara family had lobbied state senator Joe Kyrillos to support their call for another state-level review, police suggested that they might have been mistaken about the three suspects. "[W]e looked into the additional things that became areas of concern in interviewing these folks", chief assistant prosecutor Latoracca told The Star-Ledger, "and based on that, we thought that while there were reasons they came across as hinky, we ultimately didn't believe they actively killed her".

== Alternative theories ==
Police have considered two alternative possibilities related to the crime.

=== Connection to unsolved 1968 homicide ===
Early in the case, investigators noted that an unsolved 1968 killing, also in their jurisdiction, bore some similarities to the Angara case. On August 31 of that year, the body of 22-year-old Joan Freeman, from what was then known as West Paterson, was found in a hallway at the Hoffmann-La Roche plant complex that straddled the border between Clifton in Passaic County and Nutley in neighboring Essex County. She had been attacked suddenly from behind, struck several times on the head with a wooden mallet, after which the attacker slit her throat; any one of the wounds inflicted would have been enough to kill her, the coroner said.

Passaic County authorities investigated the case since it was determined to have occurred on their side of the county line. Like Angara, the case combined minimal evidence at the scene with a limited pool of suspects. Freeman, a secretary at the plant, had also been working alone, doing overtime recording employees' work hours from their time cards, on a Saturday in a second-floor library in one of the 86 buildings on the drug company's campus, when she was killed. There were no fingerprints on the mallet, and the knife used to cut her throat was never found. The campus itself was, like the Totowa treatment plant, fenced off with access permitted only to those who had been cleared to enter by security.

Like Angara, detectives pored over Freeman's personal life but could not find anything which could give rise to a motive. The county prosecutor's office, state police, and Clifton police devoted 16 investigators, including two full-time, to interview 300 people who might have been able to be on campus that day, including lie detector tests, but were unable to narrow down any specific suspects. "Many times I went home and couldn't sleep", one of the detectives recalled later. "We just didn't get that lucky break". The case is still open; detectives review the files occasionally.

"The events are similar in nature", county prosecutor Avigliano told The Star-Ledger. "A woman was murdered in a secure facility." His office's detectives studied the case both to see if anyone who had worked at Hofmann later worked for the PVWC, and to see if they could learn from how the investigators handled the Freeman case.

=== Accident ===
In May 2006, over a year after Angara's death, it was reported that some of the investigators had begun to consider the possibility that it was in fact an accident. They had contacted Scottish forensic pathologist Derrick Pounder of the University of Dundee, one of the few experts in the field of drownings, particularly those that occur in cold water. His research has found that in a small percentage of such cases, the victim experiences bruising on the neck and petechiae on the eyeballs that closely mimics injuries otherwise seen as strong indicators of premortem strangulation.

Pounder never examined Angara's body (and could not have, since it had been cremated shortly after her death in accordance with Hindu funerary traditions), nor any of the records from the autopsy. County prosecutor Avigliano noted that five medical examiners in Passaic County, who had had access to the body and records, had all agreed that the death was a homicide, but that belief was not unanimous among those who had been part of the initial investigation.

The county's chief homicide detective Wood retired in 2006 after having worked on the Angara case for 18 months. By the time of the third anniversary of Angara's death, he had come to believe, in part after considering Pounder's research, that the case was an accident resulting from negligence rather than an act of malice. He said that the plate may have been removed before Angara came to the room where it was.

An unnamed plant worker told The New York Post that on the day of Angara's death, the state had ordered some testing as a result of the pinkish discoloration. Normally the necessary sample could be collected by machines along the path, but one supervisor was "very old school. We still tested by taking water directly from the tank. And that required removing the plate", the worker said.

Wood believes that someone forgot to replace the plate. When Angara came into the dimly lit area, she did not see it and fell in, after which the person who should have replaced the plate did so in a hurry. "I don't think anyone will ever admit to taking that plate off or putting it back on because they know they're going to be held liable for it", Wood told The Star-Ledger.

In 2015 Angara's daughter disputed that theory. Her mother was exceedingly cautious, she said, and it was unlikely that she would have failed to see a dark, wide hole in the floor. At the time, plant workers said they had never seen one of those panels left open, either. "I think you would have to ignore a lot of facts to believe it was an accident", Angara's daughter said. The family has also questioned why it seemed Angara's coworkers failed to notice her absence for the rest of their day.

At that time the county prosecutor's office described the case as "open but inactive"; chief assistant prosecutor Latoracca, who was by then in private practice as a criminal defense attorney, said he understood why Wood and some other detectives had come to believe Angara's death was an accident but reiterated that he had faith in the medical conclusions that her death had been caused intentionally.

== See also ==
- Deaths in February 2005
- Crime in New Jersey
- List of unsolved murders (2000–present)
- List of drowning victims
- Indians in the New York City metropolitan area
- Death of Elisa Lam, 2013 case where a woman drowned in a Los Angeles hotel's water tank
