= Stanisław Feliksiak =

Polish zoologist

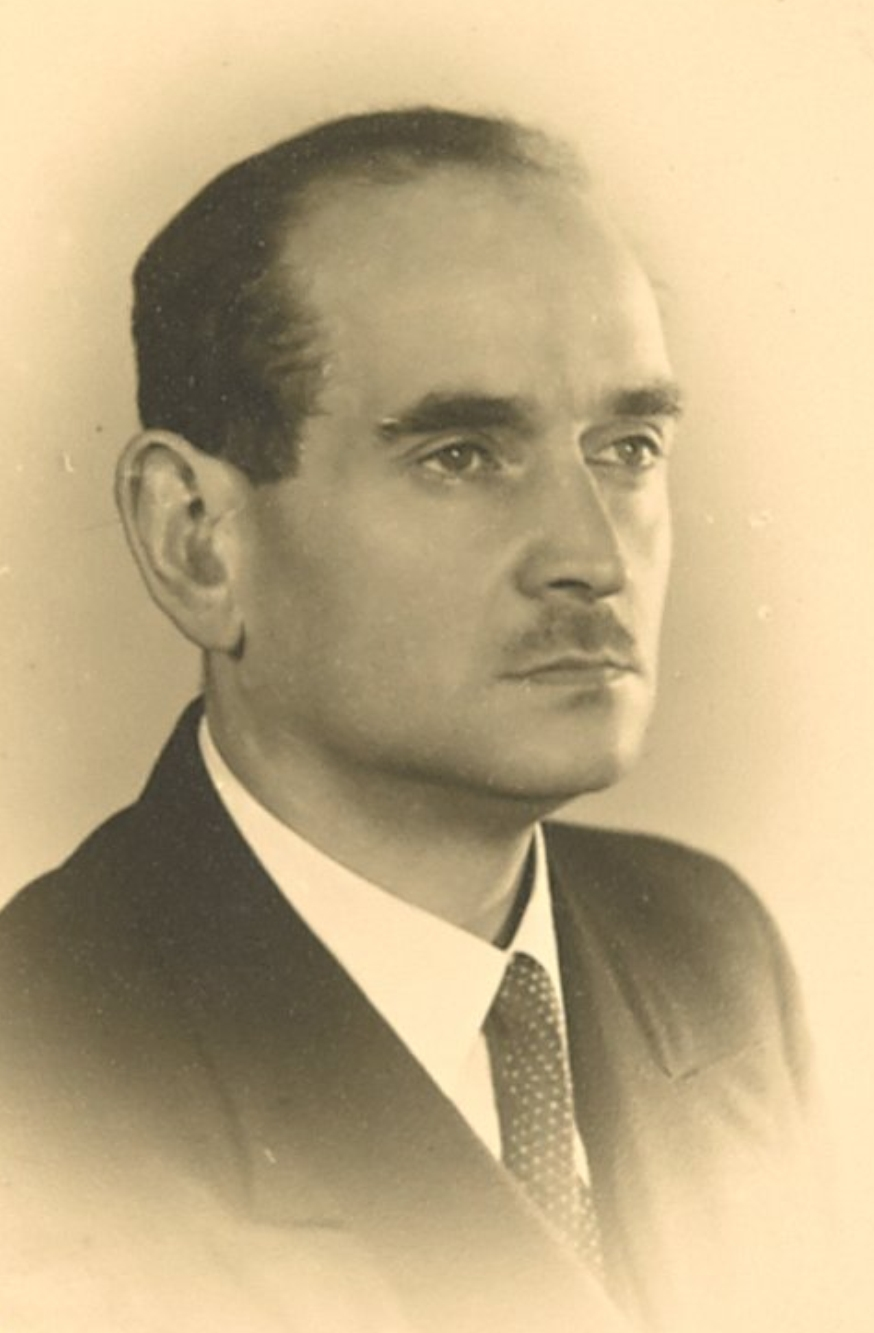

Stanisław Feliksiak (6 April 1906 – 30 June 1992) was a Polish zoologist and a director of the National Zoological Museum in Warsaw.

== Life and work ==
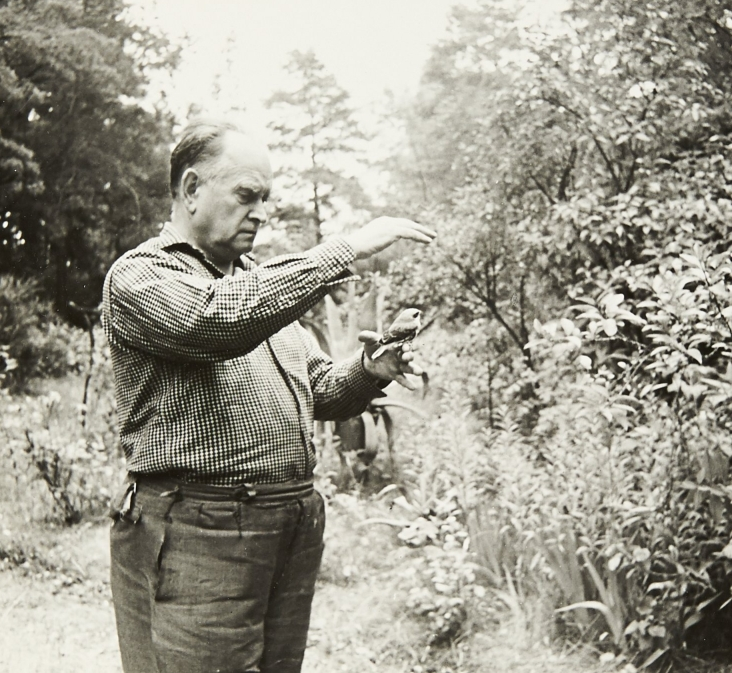
Stanisław Feliksiak; from the collection of the Museum and Institute of Zoology of the Polish Academy of Sciences

Feliksiak was born in Łódź to Jan and Anna née Krauze. After graduating from the University of Warsaw in 1930 he spent some time in Canada studying the aquatic fauna of Nova Scotia and Newfoundland. He then worked as an assistant in the molluscs section of the Zoological Museum in Warsaw from 1929 to the end of the war. During the war, he gave lectures in the underground "Flying University" and participated in the Warsaw Uprising in Czerniaków. After the war he was involved with Stanisław Lorentz and the Committee for the Evacuation of Cultural Property of Warsaw, helping recover specimens and material stolen from the Museum and taken to Germany by the Nazis. He became head of the invertebrates section in 1945 and director in 1947 for the museum. His research included malacology, biogeography, and developmental biology. He edited the journal Memorabilia Zoologica (1958-1977) and contributed to biology textbooks, many of which, under Stalinist pressure did not include Mendelian genetics and instead promoted a view forwarded by Michurin and Lysenko.

Feliksiak was married to Janina Feliksiakowa née Rożnowska. He died in Warsaw and is buried in the estate of his wife's family in Tłuszcz near Janówka.
