= David Bird (journalist) =

American financial journalist, 1959–2014

- Bird in February 2013, wearing the jacket he had on when he was last seen alive 11 months later
- Born: Trenton, New Jersey, U.S.
- Disappeared: January 11, 2014 (aged 55); Millington, New Jersey, U.S.
- Died: Presumed to be same as disappearance date Millington, New Jersey, U.S.
- Body discovered: March 18, 2015, Passaic River
- Education: Rider University
- Employer: The Wall Street Journal
- Known for: Reporting on energy markets

David Christopher Bird (c. 1959–2014) was an American journalist who covered energy markets for The Wall Street Journal and was deputy managing editor for Dow Jones Energy Service. He was known for his ability to detect emerging market trends, particularly the decline in oil prices that began in 2014, before they otherwise became apparent, through close analysis of data. Before working at the Journal, he had worked for Dow Jones overseas, based in its London office.

In early 2014, he left his Millington, New Jersey, home for a short walk and never returned. Local search efforts, hampered by that year's severe winter weather, failed to find any trace of him. Conspiracy theories surfaced, especially after an erroneous report that his credit card had been used overseas, suggesting his disappearance was part of a pattern of suspicious deaths in the financial sector. However, when his body was finally found in a nearby river 14 months later, the coroner ruled his death an accidental drowning and said there were no signs of foul play.

A native of the Trenton area, Bird was a graduate of Rider University. In addition to his journalistic work he was an outdoor enthusiast who led Boy Scout hiking trips and ran marathons. He did the latter to raise awareness for organ donation, since his life had been saved by a liver transplant following a hepatitis infection he suffered in the early 2000s.

== Early life and education ==
Bird was born in Trenton, New Jersey, and was the youngest of six children. After attending a Catholic elementary school in Hamilton Township, where the family lived, he went to Notre Dame High School in nearby Lawrenceville. He graduated from Rider College in 1980.

== Career ==
Bird worked at the News-Press of Fort Myers, Florida before joining Dow Jones Newswires, and subsequently transferring to Dow Jones's London office. Five years into his career, Bird traveled extensively through Europe and the Middle East, returning to the U.S. in 1988.

Bird worked for Dow Jones & Company (the publisher of the Wall Street Journal), for more than twenty years, rising to become deputy managing editor of the Dow Jones Energy Service. He was a key reporter on energy markets.

After his death, Journal editor-in-chief Gerard Baker praised Bird's reportorial zeal. "His ability to navigate the vast troves of public oil data was unmatched," Baker wrote in a memo to staff. "At 10:30 a.m. on Wednesdays, he could often be seen hunched over his computer, sifting through spreadsheets and crunching numbers just released by the Energy Information Administration. He was often the first to gain insight into important energy-market trends."

== Disappearance ==
Late in the afternoon of January 11, 2014, Bird, who was recovering from a brief stomach illness, left his home in the Millington section of Long Hill Township, New Jersey. He told his wife that he planned to go for a brief walk around nearby wooded trails, clad in a distinctive red raincoat with yellow zippers, jeans and sneakers. After his return, he said, he intended to take down the family's Christmas lights. He left his cell phone to recharge in his absence.

By the evening, however, he had not returned. His wife called the police and reported him missing. Finding him immediately was of great importance to the family, since he was required to take anti-rejection drugs due to his liver transplant. Those had been left at the house as well.

"This wasn't right," his wife said later. "Something was wrong." A fellow Boy Scout leader noted that if Bird "was stuck somewhere, he knows how to shelter himself enough out of the elements. He knows how to signal if he can."

== Search ==
A few days after Bird disappeared, NBC News reported that his credit card had been used in Mexico. His family, the network claimed, believed his disappearance was not an accident and somehow related to his work. The family, through a friend, said those were not serious investigative leads, just theories being floated by those looking for answers. Later they learned that the card had not, in fact, been used in Mexico after he disappeared; it had instead just been hacked. Later, his wife Nancy called that report "a distraction, honestly."

Early efforts to search included helicopter patrols by New Jersey State Police, with Morris County park police following up on horseback and all-terrain vehicle while divers searched the nearby Passaic River. Searchers suffered a setback when the winter weather turned colder than usual two weeks later followed by heavy snow throughout the region throughout the next two months; they continued their efforts by retracing their steps along the sides of local roadways, looking for signs of an unreported motor vehicle accident or personal items. In March, when the snow melted, the search resumed, focusing on areas nearby where Bird had been known to hike and retracing earlier routes. In May local police said their goal was to have the entire area within a 3-mile (4.8 km) radius of the Bird home thoroughly searched.

Dow Jones offered a $10,000 reward for information on Bird's whereabouts, and colleagues and others raised $35,000 in contributions for Bird's family. Dow Jones also kept paying Bird's salary through the end of July 2014, changing his status to unpaid leave of absence after that point. After Bird was taken off the payroll, the Independent Association of Publishers' Employees 1096, the trade union representing Journal reporters, donated $10,000 to the family and matched members' contributions up to another $10,000. Although no new leads had surfaced, on the first anniversary of Bird's disappearance his family and friends led a candlelight vigil and walk through a nearby park where he had often walked, ending in a bonfire, to keep attention on the case.

=== Discovery of body ===
On March 18, 2015, a family website asking for assistance in the search went online. That day, two canoeists on the Passaic, its waters high after another winter of heavy snow and bitter cold, found Bird's red jacket entangled in branches on the Morris County side of a stretch of the river near King George Road in neighboring Somerset County's Warren Township, roughly one mile (1.6 km) from Bird's home. They notified authorities, who found the body about 20 feet (6.1 m) off the shoreline, under 7 feet (2.1 m) of water, an area that had been searched before several times. The remains were identified through dental records. A subsequent investigation determined that the cause of death was accidental drowning. His wife believed it was possible that Bird "slipped and fell into the water while hurrying home ahead of an incoming storm."

== Personal life ==
Bird met Nancy Fleming around 1988, and they wed in 1991. The couple had two children, a son born in 1998 and a daughter born in 2001.

Bird contracted a rare form of hepatitis about nine years before his disappearance and death and received a lifesaving liver transplant in 2004, which Bird discussed on his blog and which was reported in local newspapers. Bird was an advocate for organ donation.

Bird was described in his Wall Street Journal obituary as "an avid hiker, lover of reggae music, a Boston Red Sox fan, cyclist, camper, marathoner and a scout-troop leader" who had traveled to more than 35 countries.

In the last years of his life he had started running marathons. In 2012 he finished the Harrisburg Marathon, followed by the New York City Marathon the next year. He also competed in the New York City Triathlon twice and was a member of Team Liberty at the National Transplant Games. Through his athletic activities he hoped to draw support for organ donation and be an example for other transplant recipients.

Running the marathon had particular significance for Bird since he had first learned he would need a transplant to live on the day of the 2004 marathon. He ran the race with a note thanking his donor pinned to him. "I met my goal of hitting the finish line in less time than I was in surgery," he said later.

== Alternative theories ==
Although no signs of foul play were reported in his death, Bird's fate inspired theories that what happened was somehow the result of a conspiracy of some nature that had also claimed other lives in the financial industry during the same period. According to the theory, his disappearance and death were related to a string of suicides and other untimely deaths of present and former JPMorgan Chase employees in late 2013 and early 2014, supposedly after two of them had uncovered evidence of major wrongdoing on the company's part. In his final column for Bloomberg View, several months after Bird was reported missing, William D. Cohan, a former Chase employee himself who had some admitted disputes with the company, looked into the rumors and found that Chase had indeed experienced an unusual number of deaths of employees in their 30s during that period, especially when compared to similarly sized investment banks. But, since several of those deaths were indisputably suicides, he concluded that it was just as likely that those deaths were simply the result of working in an already stressful industry during a stressful period.

== See also ==
- List of drowning victims
- List of organ transplant donors and recipients
- List of Rider University people
- List of solved missing person cases (post-2000)
