= Museum and Institute of Zoology of the Polish Academy of Sciences =

Zoological museum in Warsaw, Poland

Coordinates: 52°13′25″N 21°0′33″E

- Muzeum i Instytut Zoologii PAN
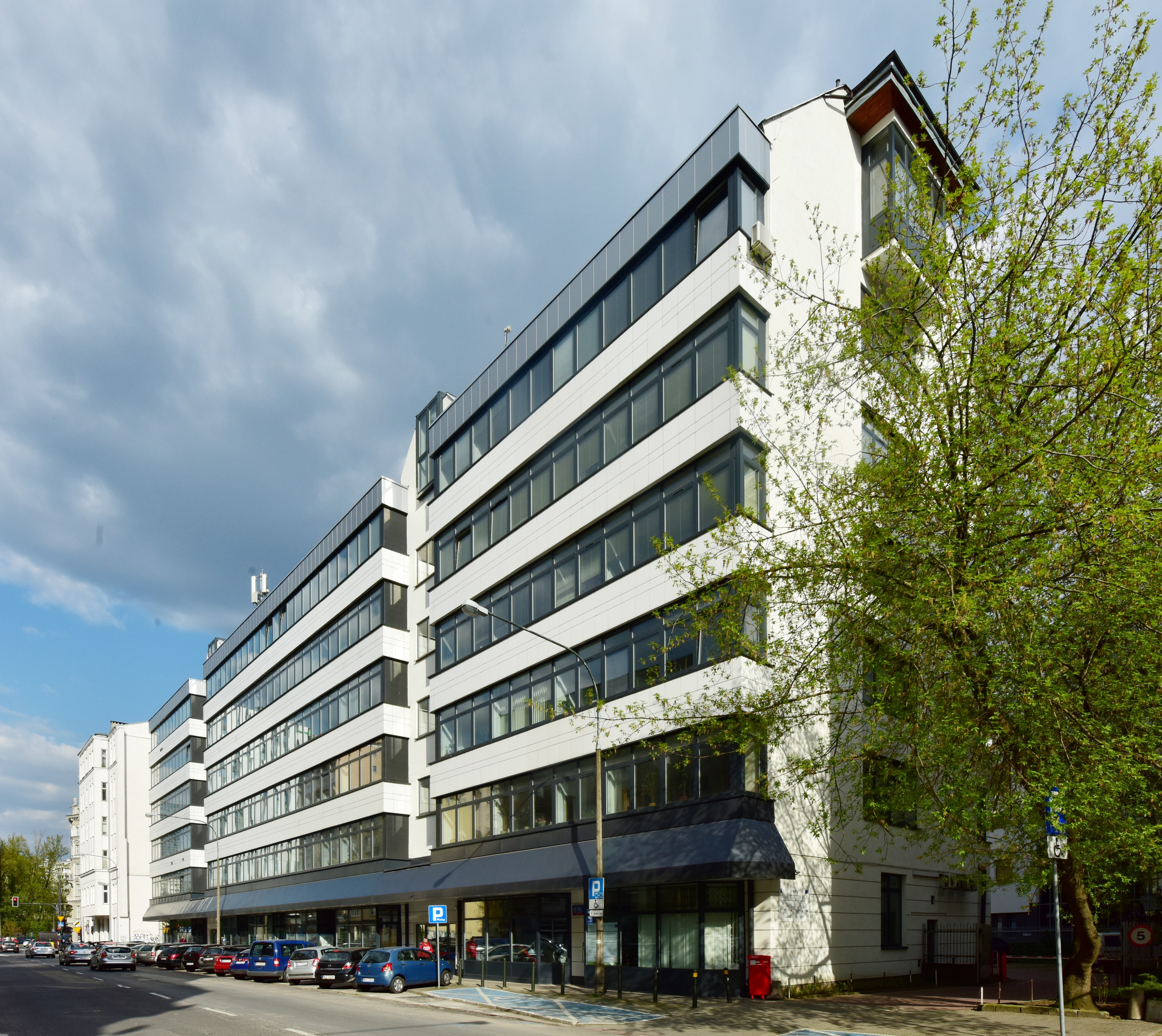
- Established: 1819
- Location: ul. Twarda 51/55; 00-818 Warsaw
- Collections: Biology
- Founders: Commission of Religion and Public Education of the Polish Kingdom
- Director: Tomasz D. Mazgajski
- Website: miiz.waw.pl

Muzeum i Instytut Zoologii PAN is a zoological museum in Warsaw, Poland. It was established in 1819. It is an institute of the Polish Academy of Sciences. It publishes the journal Acta Chiropterologica, a scientific journal on bats.

The museum was founded in 1819 as a zoological cabinet within the Royal University of Warsaw. The early development was headed by Feliks Paweł Jarocki who was followed in 1862 by Władysław Taczanowski. Taczanowski expanded the collections with help from collectors like Konstanty Jelski and the brothers Aleksander and Konstanty Branicki who sponsored collecting expeditions into South America and Africa. In 1887 the museum managed by Ksawery Branicki was opened to the public. In 1890 the collection was managed under Russian control by Nikolai Nasonov and from 1906 by Jakow Szczełkanovtsov (until 1915). The museum was called the Polish State Museum of Natural Science in 1921 and after a fire in 1935 the museum was moved to the University of Warsaw. After the Second World War, the museum was headed by Stanisław Feliksiak. In 1952, the museum became part of the Institute of Zoology of the Polish Academy of Sciences. From 1953 to 1959 the museum was headed by Tadeusz Jaczewski. In 2023, the headquarters of the Museum and Institute were moved from Wilcza Street to Twarda 51/55.

== See also ==
Michalina Isaakowa (1880–1937)
