= Bathtub Girls murder =

2003 Canadian murder case

- Date: January 18, 2003
- Location: Mississauga, Ontario, Canada
- Type: Matricide
- Cause: Drowning made to look accidentally caused by alcohol intoxication
- Motive: Victim's neglectful parenting, financial
- Deaths: 1
- Convicted: Victim's daughters
- Charges: First-degree murder
- Sentence: 10 years incarceration
- The victim and perpetrators' names cannot be reported by Canadian media under the Youth Criminal Justice Act

The Bathtub Girls murder took place in Mississauga, Ontario, Canada, on January 18, 2003. Two sisters, whose identities along with the victim's are protected under Canada's Youth Criminal Justice Act (YCJA) as they were minors at the time of the crime, conspired to murder their alcoholic, neglectful mother and make it appear as if she had accidentally drowned while taking a bath, in order to claim the insurance money. The death was not considered suspicious for almost a year.

Eleven months after the murder, a young man came forward to the police, informing them that one of the sisters said that the girls drowned their mother. An investigation began that included testimony gained when the young man was wired for audio and video, assessment of text messages and internet searches on a computer they owned, and interviews of their friends. The girls were arrested in January 2004. In late 2005, they went to trial and were convicted of first degree murder. In June 2006, they were sentenced to ten years, six years of incarceration and four years of community supervision, the maximum sentence for juveniles under the YCJA. Both have since completed their sentences and been released.

== Background ==
The names Linda, Sandra, Elizabeth (Beth), and Bobby Andersen are aliases created by journalist Bob Mitchell for the victim, her older daughter, her other daughter, and her son, respectively.

Linda Andersen gave birth to the children in Mississauga, Ontario. (Note: The family was also said to have lived in Brampton (21 kilometres (13 miles) northwest of Mississauga).) Her husband abandoned the family, leaving Andersen to support the children herself. She suffered from depression and a dependency on alcohol.

Andersen then married a man who was convicted of drunk driving, and then domestic abuse in 2001. After her second husband left, Andersen's drinking worsened, (Note: The abusive man may have been a boyfriend and not a husband.) and the girls took on more household responsibilities.

By 2002, her daughters came to resent the amount of money that their mother spent on alcohol and wished that they had some of the things that their friends had like "swimming pools and clothes", which they thought would make them more popular. Sandra described surviving childhood sexual abuse, which went unreported by a priest, in whom she had confided. She also said that her mother drove drunk and did not provide basic necessities for the family. Sandra said that she tried and failed to report the abuse to Children's Aid Society.

Because of their discontent, the sisters began to search on the Internet for ways to kill their mother. The teenagers believed that by killing their mother, they would be entitled to $133,000 in insurance ($212,000 in 2025). The sisters resolved that it would be spent on a trip with their friends to Europe and the purchase of a house. They decided to drown their mother because they believed it would be "fast and unspectacular". After formulating a murder plan, they informed three of their friends, who all encouraged them. The friends remained steadfast in their support of the sisters and did not alert their parents, the police, or other authority figures about the crime.

Andersen, 43 or 44 years old at the time of her murder, was an unemployed X-ray technologist.

== Murder ==
During lunch time on January 18, 2003, the sisters began giving their mother liquor in order to get her drunk. Their plan was to make Linda fully inebriated so that she could not resist their attack. They also gave their mother six Tylenol 3 tablets (containing codeine) to slow down her heart.

The murder was intended to look like an accident.

Sandra and Beth filled the family bathtub with water and took their mother to the bathroom. She had difficulty getting into the bathtub, because of the mixture of vodka and pills she had been given. After putting gloves on, Sandra and Beth gave their mother a massage. Within minutes, according to police reports, Sandra instructed her mother to lie on her stomach so that she could scrub her back. Sandra instantly pushed her mother's head down and did not let go. After four minutes, Sandra released her mother's head and found Andersen to be dead. After having killed their mother, Sandra and Beth went with their friends to a nearby restaurant both to celebrate their victory and create an alibi. When they met up with their friends at 6:51 p.m., the girls communicated that they had killed their mother.

The girls returned to their home about 10:30 p.m. and called 9-1-1. They said that when they had left the house about 6 p.m., their mother was drunk and about to take a bath.

The cause of death was determined to be accidental drowning secondary to alcohol intoxication. Analysis of bodily fluids disclosed very high levels of alcohol (around 400 mgs%) and drugs, including codeine and acetaminophen. Dr. Robert Langville, a forensic toxicologist, testified that Andersen had five times the legal blood-alcohol level for driving in her system and three times the safe level of codeine in her blood when she died.

The girls lived with an aunt and their three-year-old brother lived with other family members. Manulife, an insurance company, paid out $133,674.90 to the two girls and $67,000 to their brother.

About eleven months after Andersen's death, at a party, one of the girls spoke to a young male friend about the crime. He went to the police and told them that one of the girls had told him that she and her sister had drowned their mother. Following his report a car was provided to the male friend, who was wired for audio and video by the police. He talked with the girls about the details of their mother's murder over the course of one month.

== Arrest and trial ==
The defendants, who came to be known as the "bathtub girls", were arrested on January 21, 2004 and initially placed in separate youth correctional centres. They were later placed under house arrest. Both sisters made taped confessions of the crime, which were used as evidence in the trial. A computer was seized from the girl's residence and chat messages were found regarding the preparations, plans, and enactment of the murder. There were also searches for information about the effects of mixing alcohol and Tylenol-3 prior to the murder.

Sandra and Beth were tried beginning in November 2005 and found guilty of first degree murder. In June 2006, they were sentenced to 10 years in prison for first degree murder, the maximum youth sentence. The 10 years consisted of six years in custody and four years under community supervision. If they had been tried as adults, they would have received life sentences. Although tried as youths, they were incarcerated in prisons for women. While the sisters were incarcerated they were unable to communicate with one another.

In his decision about the case, Justice Bruce Duncan stated that the girls grew up in a poor, depressing and degrading home atmosphere, even though their mother earned a good income. They were not able to empathize that their mother was absent a lot because she worked double shifts, was often exhausted, and drank to self-medicate.

Justice Bruce Duncan said in the conclusion of his decision:

The two defendants set out to commit the perfect crime but instead they created the perfect prosecution. The case against them is overwhelming. It is probably the strongest case I have ever seen in over thirty years of prosecuting, defending and judging criminal cases.

The Crown sought to collect the insurance money paid out to the girls, since they received money for having committed a crime. Only $48,487.04 remained in 2006. Whatever was recovered was paid out to their brother.

A young man, Beth's boyfriend, was convicted for conspiring to murder her mother and covering up the crime, based upon chat logs between him and the sisters. He also provided about five Tylenol-3 pills for the murder. Found guilty in December 2006, he was originally sentenced to 18 months, but ultimately received eight months in prison followed by four months under supervision.

== Aftermath ==
By receiving youth sentences, the goal is for children to be rehabilitated and have a chance at a normal life. The older sister, Sandra, was released to a halfway house in 2009, while the younger sister, Beth, was released a year later.

By 2020, it was reported that Sandra graduated from university and became a scientist, while Beth was married, became a mother, and graduated from law school. To pass the bar in Ontario, individuals are required to "be of good character". They are also required to report all criminal proceedings to the Law Society of Ontario, which could result in a hearing to determine if they meet ethical and professional standards. Liam O’Connor, a criminal defence lawyer, said in 2018 that he "might give a youthful killer a second chance" to become a lawyer, but not an adult murderer.

== Popular culture ==
In 2008, journalist Bob Mitchell wrote the book The Class Project: How to Kill a Mother – The True Story of Canada's Infamous Bathtub Girls.

Linda Andersen's murder case was broadcast on the American television series Deadly Women in 2010. A documentary of the murder was shown on the Dark Waters of Crime series on Viva Channel.

In 2014, the crime drama film Perfect Sisters, was based on the murder of Linda Andersen. In 2015, it was released in the UK under the name Deadly Sisters.

== See also ==
- Crime in Canada
- List of drowning victims
- Menendez brothers murder, similar 1989 California case where siblings killed parents claiming the father was abusive and lived off inheritance for a year before law enforcement learned the truth from an informant.
