= List of Rider University people =

This is a list of notable graduates of Rider University (formerly Rider College) in Lawrenceville, New Jersey.

== Notable alumni ==
=== Business ===
- Carol Meyrowitz, CEO of TJX Companies
- Robert Miller, Canadian billionaire who founded Future Electronics
- Bernard V. Vonderschmitt, founder/CEO of Xilinx
- Kenneth Yen, CEO of China Motor Corporation and Yulon

=== Government ===
- Antonio Arocho, attorney and former chief operating officer of the Hispanic National Bar Association
- Milton Nathaniel Barnes, Liberian ambassador to the United Nations
- Jack Casey, member of the New Jersey Senate and General Assembly
- Robert D. Clifton, member of the New Jersey General Assembly
- John F. Cordisco, former member of the Pennsylvania House of Representatives
- Frederick W. Donnelly, former mayor of Trenton, New Jersey
- Eldridge Hawkins, Jr., mayor of Orange, New Jersey
- Valerie Huttle, Democrat who serves in the New Jersey General Assembly where she represents the 37th Legislative District
- Vincent Ignizio, member of New York City Council; former member of New York State Assembly
- Peter Inverso, former member of the New Jersey State Senate
- Marvin Keller, Pennsylvania State representative and senator
- Paul Kramer, member of the New Jersey General Assembly
- James J. McCullough, former member of the New Jersey State Senate
- Connie Myers, MA, former member of the New Jersey General Assembly
- Joseph A. Palaia, Monmouth County freeholder, former member of the New Jersey General Assembly and New Jersey State Senate
- Michael T. Peifer, member of the Pennsylvania House of Representatives
- Mark S. Schweiker, MA, 44th governor of Pennsylvania
- Shirley Turner, MA, member and president pro tempore of the New Jersey State Senate
- Edward von Kloberg III, infamous lobbyist

=== Sports ===
==== Baseball ====
- Jack Armstrong, former Major League Baseball pitcher; 1990 MLB All-Star and World Champion
- Kevin Barry, former Major League Baseball pitcher
- Al Downing, former Major League Baseball pitcher; 1967 MLB All-Star & Strikeout Champion; 1971 MLB Comeback Player of the Year
- Jim Hoey, former Major League Baseball relief pitcher
- Jeff Kunkel, former Major League Baseball player; 3rd pick of the 1983 MLB draft by the Texas Rangers
- Nick Margevicius, Major League Baseball pitcher for the Seattle Mariners
- Danny Napoleon, former Major League Baseball outfielder

==== Basketball ====
- Dick Kuchen, former head basketball coach at Yale University and the University of California
- Digger Phelps, former Notre Dame Fighting Irish basketball coach; ESPN analyst
- Jason Thompson, former National Basketball Association power forward/center; 12th pick in the 2008 NBA draft; current player with Fenerbahçe

==== Soccer ====
- Jose Aguinaga, current midfielder for El Paso Locomotive
- Jim McKeown, retired American soccer defender who played in the North American Soccer League
- Bobby Smith, National Soccer Hall of Fame member; former NASL and U.S. National defender
- Florian Valot, current midfielder for New York Red Bulls

==== Other sports ====
- Nick Catone, Male Athlete of the Year (2004); retired professional MMA fighter formerly competing in the UFC's Middleweight Division
- Jazmine Fenlator, Female Athlete of the Year (2006 and 2007); U.S. Olympic bobsled pilot at 2014 Winter Olympics at Sochi, now competes for her father's Jamaica National Team
- Caroline Lind, MBA, Olympic gold medal rower at the 2008 Summer Olympics in Beijing
- Carmelo Marrero, wrestler; professional mixed martial arts fighter
- Georgio Poullas, wrestler

=== Media & entertainment ===
- David Bird, financial journalist
- John Bundy, magician with two appearances on the Late Show with David Letterman
- Matt Cook (born 1984, class of 2002), actor known for his roles as Mo McCracken on the TBS sitcom Clipped and most recently as Lowell in the CBS sitcom Man with a Plan
- William Mastrosimone, playwright
- James Morgart, horror film director, producer, screenwriter, actor, and critic
- Roberta Naas, journalist
- Joanne Nosuchinsky, actress (summa cum laude), The Awesome 80s Prom (Off Broadway); Miss New York USA 2013; Fox News Channel contributor; former occasional fill-in host for Red Eye w/Greg Gutfeld; contributor to The Greg Gutfeld Show
- Tom Papa, comedian and host of NBC's The Marriage Ref
- Barbara Park, author of children's books
- Gerald Peary, film critic; reviewer and columnist for the Boston Phoenix since 1996; former acting curator of the Harvard Film Archive

== Notable faculty ==
- Sally Brophy (1928–2007), television actor of the 1950s and 1960s; instructed theater arts at Rider for two decades; graduate of the Royal Academy in London, England
- Jack Sullivan, literary scholar, essayist, author, editor, musicologist, and short story writer
