= Michalina Isaakowa =

Polish amateur entomologist (1880-1937)

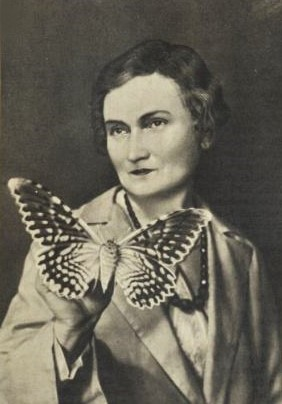
- Isaakowa with a giant butterfly from her book Polka w puch Parany
- Born: Michalina Hochbaum; 1880; Poland
- Died: 1937 (aged 56–57); Ucayali River, Peru
- Occupations: Entomologist, traveler and writer
- Known for: Butterfly specimens
- Spouse: Julius Isaac (1870–1923)

Michalina Isaakowa (1880–1937) was a Polish amateur entomologist, traveler and writer who was admitted to the Polish Entomological Society. She specialized in the butterflies of South America and travelled there alone to collect them, returning to Poland with 15,000 specimens. She disappeared in Peru while on her second butterfly collection trip.

== Biography ==
Michalina Hochbaum was the daughter of the administrator of several landed estates in the Świętokrzyskie region of Poland, Natal Hochbaum and Emilia Kiesiewicz, who had numerous offspring. Little is known about her early education, but she knew Latin and French and spoke Russian fluently. She also had considerable knowledge in the fields of biology, geography and history.

While she was in her thirties, Michalina married the widower Julius Isaac (1870–1923) and began using her married name Michalina Isaakowa. Her husband was a respected amateur entomologist, owner of a large collection of unique insect specimens and author of entomological publications. She settled with him in Zawiercie and under his guidance she transformed from an observer of local living species of the order Lepidoptera into the first Polish butterfly researcher. Every day, she accompanied her husband on field expeditions, and also expanded her knowledge and honed her practical entomologist skills in his studio in Zawiercie.

=== Brazil trip ===
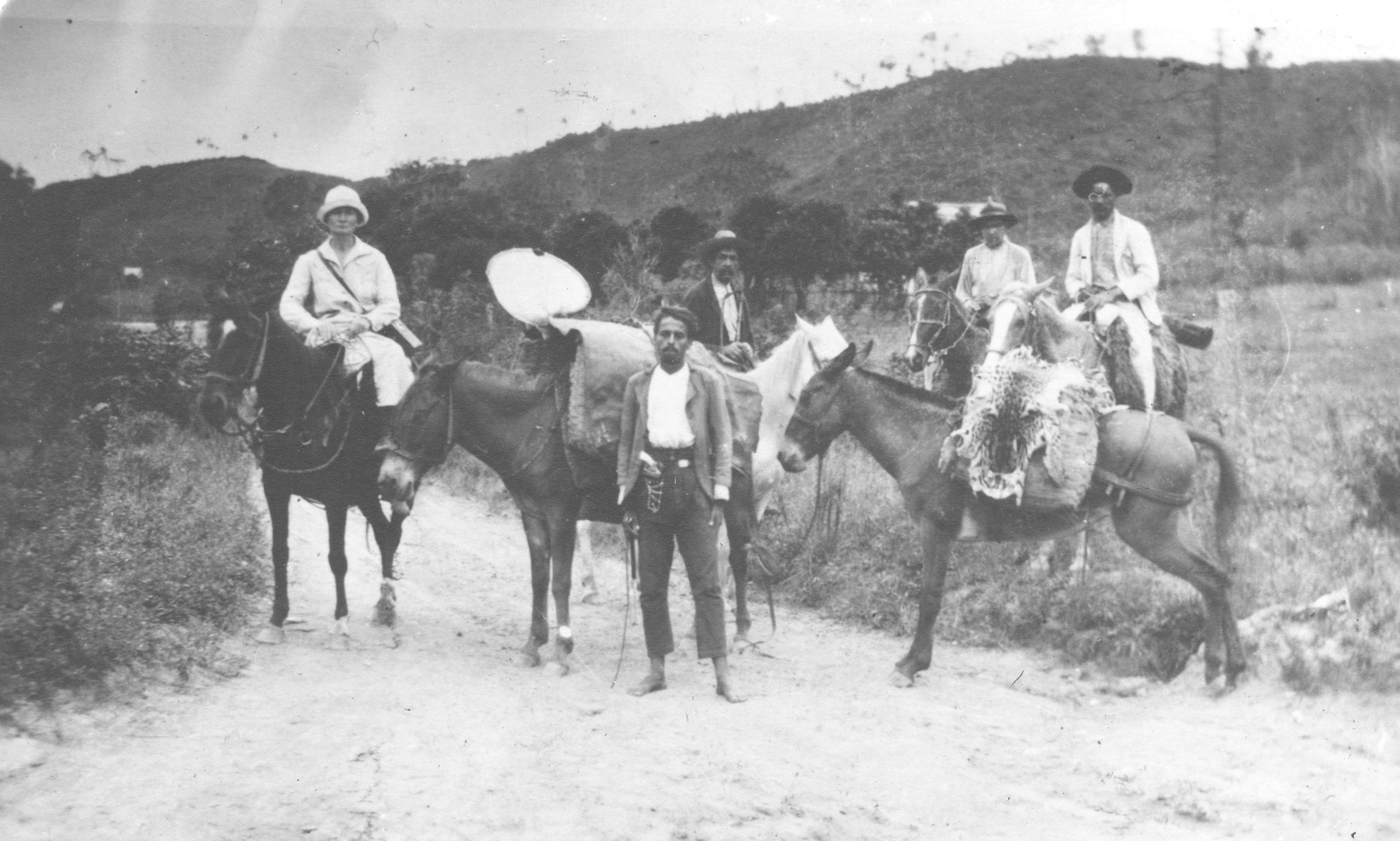
Isaakowa returning from Parana on horseback - baskets with harvest are visible on the mules, 1928

The couple shared a dream to travel to South America to search for tropical butterflies on their own. Unfortunately, a lack of adequate funds, and later Isaac's illness and death in 1923, prevented their departure. So she realized the trip on her own. After three years of preparation, and at 46 years of age, Isaakowa set out in September 1926 for Brazil. She sailed from Marseille, France, to Rio de Janeiro, Brazil, and she stayed in that country for almost two years from 1926 to 1928. During that time she traversed the state of Paraná, reached the Ivaí River and the Apucarana area, among other places. Her expeditions in Paraná were fraught with danger - getting lost in the thick jungle, encountering wild animals, unpredictable and sudden weather events, and attacks by armed bandits terrorizing the local population. In addition to collecting butterflies in the field, she spent a lot of effort getting to know the people in Polish settlements in Curitiba. It was to this city that she headed as soon as she arrived in Brazil. Within a few months, she had learned Portuguese, as well as how to ride horses, row boats and shoot guns.

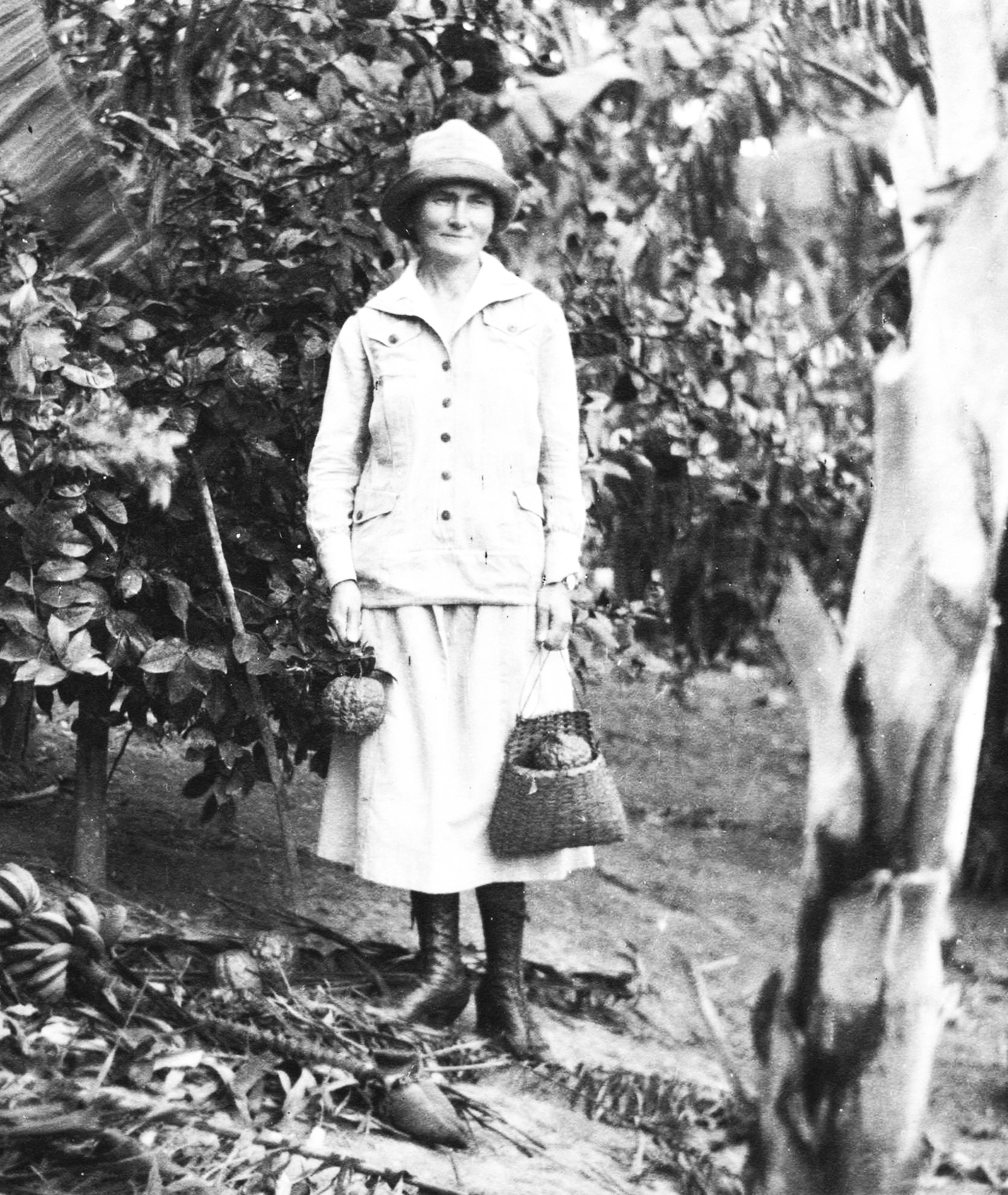
Isaakowa on a Brazilian banana plantation, 1928

She kept a record of her travels in a detailed diary. Her accounts from Brazil appeared in a book published in 1937 entitled Polka in the Parana Wilderness, accompanied by photographs she had taken. Her book is an excellent naturalistic documentation of the Parana jungle that no longer exists in the condition described in the book.

Isaakowa returned to Poland in May 1928, bringing back 15,000 specimens (part of them are currently in the Museum and Institute of Zoology of the Polish Academy of Sciences in Warsaw). She later presented her work, holding exhibitions and lectures throughout the country, which were very popular. In recognition of her original research, she was admitted to the Polish Entomological Society.

=== Peru trip ===
At the end of 1936, she set off again for South America and headed for Peru, but she disappeared without a trace and never returned from this expedition. Newspapers reported that her death was caused by fever. However, in 1939, shortly before the outbreak of World War II, the Polish embassy in Rio de Janeiro officially informed the traveler's family of her drowning after her Indian dugout canoe crashed on the Ucayali River. The tragic accident was said to have occurred in 1937. Due to the war effort, a search operation was never undertaken and her body was never recovered.
