= Martin family disappearance =

1958 missing family case in Oregon

- Clockwise from top left: Kenneth, Barbara, Barbie, Virginia, and Susan Martin
- Date: December 7, 1958
- Duration: August 25, 2025; Missing for 66 years, 8 months and 18 days
- Location: Hood River County, Oregon, U.S.
- Type: Disappearance; unexplained death
- Deaths: Susan Martin (Note: Recovered from the Columbia River near Camas, Washington, May 3, 1959.) †; Virginia Martin (Note: Recovered from the Columbia River near Bonneville Dam, May 4, 1959.) †; Kenneth R. Martin (Note: Remains identified on April 16, 2026.) †; Barbara Martin †; Barbara 'Barbie' Martin †

The Martin family of Portland, Oregon, United States, disappeared on December 7, 1958, in the Columbia River Gorge during a day trip to gather greenery for Christmas decorations. The missing family consisted of Kenneth Martin (aged 54); his wife, Barbara (48); and the couple's three daughters, Barbara ("Barbie"), Virginia and Susan (aged 14, 13, and 11, respectively). The eldest child, Donald, was in the United States Navy and stationed in New York State at the time of the disappearance. Several months after the family vanished, the bodies of Susan and Virginia were discovered downstream on the shores of the Columbia River, roughly 30 miles (48 km) apart from each other.

Police initially speculated that the family's car may have crashed into the river, though the circumstances surrounding the event could not be fully explained. Complicating the case was the discovery of a stolen handgun and the arrest of two ex-convicts in the area the day after the family's disappearance. Investigators were unable to determine if the incidents were in any way connected.

The whereabouts of Kenneth, Barbara and Barbie remained unknown for more than 60 years. In August 2025, diver Archer Mayo discovered human remains and various artifacts, including a camera cover with Ken Martin's name on it, inside a vehicle found submerged in Cascade Locks. In April 2026, the Oregon State Medical Examiner’s Office announced that DNA testing had identified the remains as being those of Kenneth Martin, Barbara Martin, and Barbie Martin. The family's disappearance has been described as one of the "most baffling" mysteries in Oregon history, and it sparked the greatest manhunt the state had undertaken at the time.

== Disappearance ==
On the evening of December 6, 1958, Kenneth and Barbara Martin of Portland, Oregon, attended a Christmas party before returning to their home at 1715 N.E. 56th Avenue in the Roseway neighborhood of Northeast Portland.. The couple had made plans for a day trip into the country for the following day.

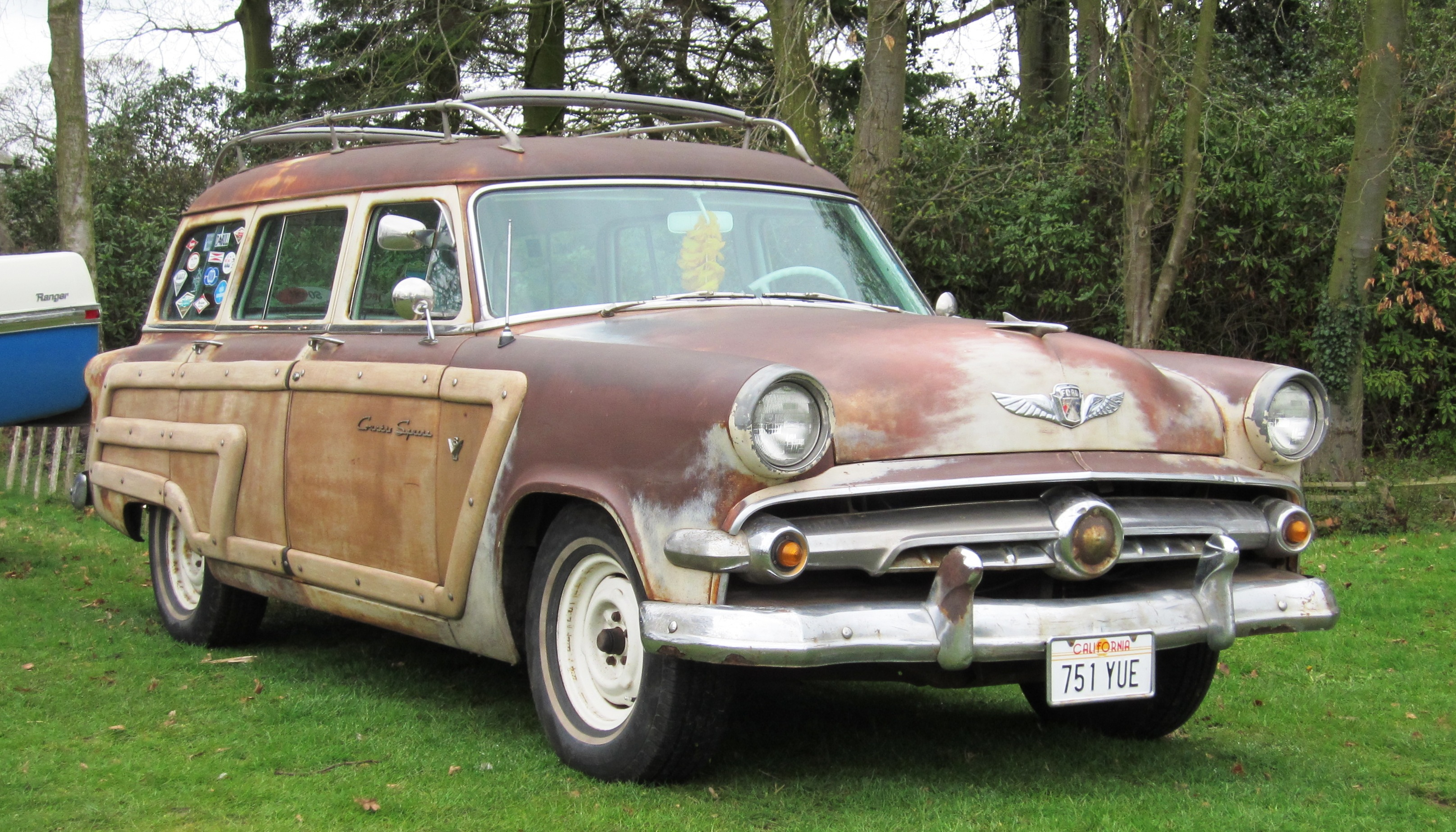
A 1954 Ford Country Squire, the same year and model of the Martins' car

In the late morning of Sunday, December 7, Kenneth and Barbara left their home with their daughters Barbie, Susan and Virginia in their 1954 cream and red-colored Ford Country Squire station wagon. Barbie, the eldest daughter, was a freshman at Grant High School. The family's eldest child, Donald, aged 28, was a pharmacist's mate in the United States Navy and stationed at Fort Schuyler, New York.

The Martins headed east for a drive into the Columbia River Gorge, where they intended to gather greenery to make Christmas wreaths and decorations. The knowledge of where the family travelled specifically throughout the day is sparse. Dean Baxter, a gas station proprietor, reported that he encountered the Martins when they purchased 5 US gallons (19 L) of gasoline from his store in Cascade Locks around 4 p.m., approximately 40 miles (64 km) from their home in Portland.

According to Baxter, he recalled their car continuing east after they had purchased gasoline. The family was seen again shortly after at the Paradise Snack Bar in Hood River, approximately 20 miles (32 km) east of Cascade Locks, where a waitress named Clara York stated she served the family. Other reports from passing motorists indicated that the family was seen in an unspecified location on the north bank of the Columbia River, in Washington State, at dusk.

According to eyewitnesses who saw the family that day, Kenneth was reportedly wearing a tan zip-up jacket and dark slacks. Barbara wore a navy blue coat, a plaid jacket and a black print dress. Barbie was reportedly dressed in jeans with rolled cuffs and a beige coat.

== Investigation ==
=== Initial search efforts ===
Martin family disappearance (Oregon)

On December 9, Kenneth failed to report to his job at Eccles Electric Home Service Company, while Barbie was noted absent from her morning classes at Grant High School. Both Susan and Virginia were reported absent by their teachers at Rose City School. The family was officially reported missing that evening by Kenneth's boss, Taylor Eccles. Police investigated their residence at approximately 11:00 p.m., searching for any signs of foul play. The house had been left undisturbed. A load of laundry was in the washing machine, and dishes from the previous day were left on a drying rack in the kitchen. There was also a substantial amount of money in the Martins' bank accounts.

Searches were undertaken by both Multnomah County and Hood River County police, but neither were able to produce substantial leads. A stolen white 1951 Chevrolet registered in Venice, Los Angeles, California, was found in Cascade Locks the day of the Martins' disappearance, but was quickly dismissed by police, as it did not match their vehicle. Also found near the site of the abandoned Chevrolet was a .38 Colt Commander handgun, which had been disposed of in the bushes and was covered in dried blood.

The handgun was turned over to law enforcement but never processed for evidence. The gun's serial number was traced to a Meier & Frank department store. It was discovered that the gun had been among several sporting good items that the Martins' son Donald had been accused of stealing while working at a Meier and Frank two years prior.

=== Alleged sightings ===
On December 8, Roy Light and another unnamed man—both ex-convicts—were arrested for car theft in Hood River County in connection with the abandoned Chevrolet, which raised suspicion in relation to the Martins' disappearance. A waiter at the Hood River restaurant where the Martins were last seen told law enforcement he saw Light, who was an acquaintance, and the other ex-convict in the restaurant at the same time. He also stated that the two men left at the same time the Martins did.

Other tips were submitted to law enforcement in the weeks and months following the family's disappearance, including over 200 letters and hundreds of phone calls. Among them was a report from an orchard owner east of Portland who claimed to have witnessed a man and woman on December 7, gathering greenery in a canyon where a Native American burial ground was located. He added that the following week, he noticed a flock of buzzards flying in this direction. The canyon was searched, but nothing was found.

On December 28, a woman's glove was discovered near the site of the abandoned Chevrolet, which family stated was "similar" to a glove Barbara "would wear". It could not positively be identified as belonging to her. On December 31, a man called police reporting he had seen a vehicle matching the Martins' Ford speeding on the Baldock Freeway. Police were alerted along the freeway, but the car could not be located. A letter was received from a witness who claimed to have seen a family resembling the Martins in Burlington, Iowa, on Christmas Eve. One of the last reported sightings of the Ford came on January 7, 1959, from a truck driver who stated he had seen a car matching the Martins' description parked in Billings, Montana, with Oregon license plates.

By February 1959, investigators had undertaken searches of various locations, including the greater Portland metropolitan region, as well as searches on Mount Hood. During this time, a volunteer searcher found tire tracks leading off a cliff near The Dalles, which reportedly matched the tires on the Martins' Ford. Paint chips recovered at this location were sent to the Federal Bureau of Investigation (FBI) for analysis, and it was determined that the paint was the same paint used on the make and model of the Ford. Based on the possibility that the Martins' vehicle might have plunged into the river, the United States Army Corps of Engineers lowered the level of the river by 5 feet (1.5 m) in the lake behind Bonneville Dam, which was searched with sonar technology, but yielded no results.

== Recovery of Susan and Virginia ==
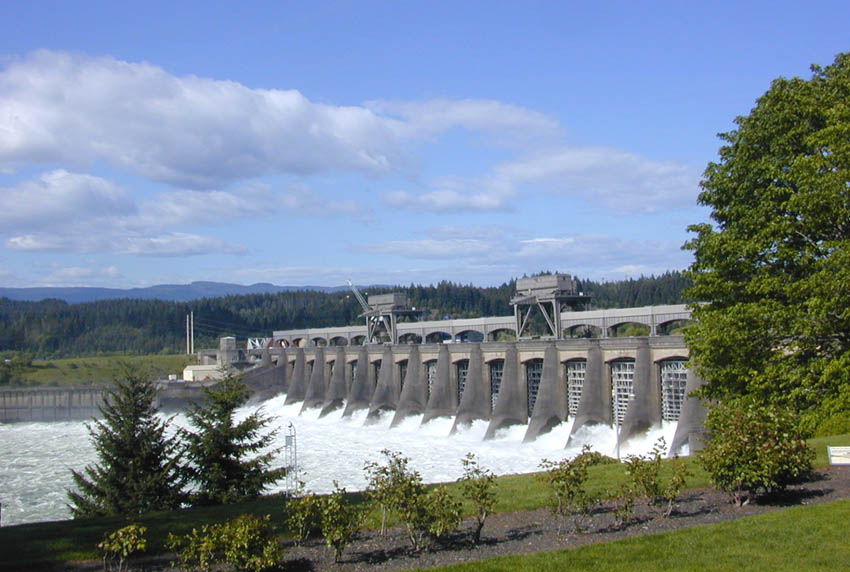
Virginia's body was discovered near Bonneville Dam (pictured), approximately 46 miles (74 km) from where the family was last seen

On May 1, 1959, three months after the tire tracks were reported, a river drilling rig near The Dalles reportedly hooked something of substantial weight to its anchor. It became dislodged before it could be pulled to the surface. In the early morning hours of May 2, a fisherman and his wife reported seeing what appeared to be two bodies floating downstream near Cascade Locks. They later encountered the bodies near Bonneville Dam.

On the afternoon of May 3, the body of Susan was discovered on the north bank of the Columbia River, near Camas, Washington, roughly 70 miles (110 km) west of The Dalles. Her identity was positively confirmed via dental records. The next morning, the body of Virginia was discovered near Bonneville Dam, roughly 46 miles (74 km) west of The Dalles, also confirmed via dental records.

Susan's body was taken to the Clark County medical examiner's office before being transferred to Multnomah County in Portland for autopsies. One of the technicians who had taken fingerprints prior to the autopsies indicated to the medical examiner what they believed to be bullet holes in the heads of each of the girls' bodies. In the medical examiner's report, no such injuries were found and the cause of death for both of the girls was declared as drowning. Traces of metal, including aluminum, were recovered from Susan's clothing. The spot on the river bank where the drill rig encountered a submerged object, and where the car is suspected to have gone into the river, was directly opposite an aluminum smelting plant.

Rupert Gillmouthe, the sheriff of Hood River County at the time, suspected that the drilling rig had overturned the Martins' car at the bottom of the river and dislodged one of the doors, allowing the bodies of Susan and Virginia to escape and surface downstream. Further searches of the water were undertaken by both sonar and helicopter, but were unfruitful. The search for Kenneth, Barbara and Barbie was suspended after a search diver nearly drowned.

== Aftermath and theories ==
Police theorized that the Martins may have died as a result of Kenneth's crashing their vehicle into the Columbia River. Another theory held that the family had been abducted and forced off a cliffside into the river.

In 1961, a resident of Camas wrote a letter to The Oregon Journal stating that they were parked with a companion in Cascade Locks on December 7, 1958, and had witnessed a vehicle proceeding under the railroad tracks leading toward the locks. Moments later, they heard screaming, but upon investigating, found nothing.

In December 1966, Donald—the only surviving member of the family—inherited the family's estate, which had been in mandated probate for seven years. After retring from the navy, he moved to Kapolei, Hawaii and became a teacher at James Campbell High School, ʻEwa Beach. Donald was the father of three children and died in October 2004 at age 73. He is buried with his wife at the National Memorial Cemetery of the Pacific.

Multnomah County police consistently suspected foul play in the Martins' disappearance, based on the evidence of the tire tracks that indicated their vehicle was deliberately pushed from the cliff. Also troubling were the reported sightings of the family at dusk on the north bank of the river in Washington, while the tire tracks placed them on the south side of the river in Oregon. This would suggest that their car would have fallen over the cliff after nightfall.

The arrest of the two ex-convicts the day after the family's disappearance, for car theft, was also noted, though police were unable to determine whether the incidents were related. Walter Graven, a Portland detective who died in 1988, ardently felt the family had met with foul play and that their murders would be solved once their car was discovered.

The cremated remains of Susan and Virginia remained at the River View Abbey Mausoleum in Portland, unclaimed for over a decade after their deaths. On December 30, 1969, the urns containing their remains were retrieved by an unknown individual. The girls' paternal grandmother, Margaret Martin, had died the day before, December 29, and the girls' cremated remains were claimed while funeral arrangements were being made for her.

For most of the latter part of the 20th century, no search efforts to recover the remaining three missing family members were made. In July 1999, Oregonian journalist Margie Boulé, who had become interested in the case, organized a dive search of the Columbia River near Cascade Locks, searching for the Martins' car. This search utilized new sonar, Global Positioning System (GPS) and lidar underwater acoustic technology, but ultimately proved unsuccessful.

== Discovery ==
In late 2024, 66 years after the Martins disappeared, the Martin family car was discovered in the Columbia River near Cascade Locks by diver Archer Mayo, who had been independently investigating the disappearance. The vehicle was located approximately 50 feet (15 m) below the water's surface, buried beneath rock, silt, and other debris, and was unearthed using a vacuum dredge. Several other vehicles were also found in the process. Recovery efforts began March 6, 2025. Portions of the vehicle, including the chassis, rear axle and engine, were extracted and sent to the Oregon State crime laboratory for examination.

A diver who helped find the Martins' car announced on August 22, 2025 that he had found the remains of several people that have been pulled from the car. A camera case with Ken Martin's name and address was also recovered, providing important confirmation of the car's identity. On April 16, 2026, the Oregon State Medical Examiner’s Office stated that they had identified the remains of Kenneth Martin, Barbara Martin, and Barbie Martin following DNA analysis by Othram, Inc. of remains located in the Columbia River within the wreckage of the Martin family car. The Hood River County Sheriff’s Office has concluded its investigation, having found no evidence of a crime.

== See also ==
- List of people who disappeared mysteriously: 1910–1990

== Sources ==
- Fisher, JB (2019). Echo of Distant Water: The 1958 Disappearance of Portland's Martin Family. Walterville, Oregon: Trine Day. ISBN 978-1-634-24241-7.
