= Followed (film) =

2018 cyber horror film directed by Antoine Le

- Theatrical release poster
- Directed by: Antoine Le
- Written by: Todd Klick
- Produced by: Matthew Ryan Brewbaker; Antoine Le; Todd Klick
- Starring: Matthew Solomon; John Savage; Sam Valentine; Tim Drier; Caitlin Grace; Kelsey Griswold
- Cinematography: Nelson Pun
- Edited by: Matthew Ryan Brewbaker
- Music by: Jason Soudah
- Production companies: Viscape Arts; Branded Pictures Entertainment
- Distributed by: Global View Entertainment
- Release dates: September 7, 2018 (BIFF); June 19, 2020 (United States)
- Running time: 96 minutes
- Country: United States
- Language: English
- Box office: $548,608

Followed is a 2018 American screenlife supernatural horror film written by Todd Klick and directed by Antoine Le, in his feature directorial debut. The film is told almost entirely through a single screencast, in which a sequence of vlogs being watched on a website chronicle the events of the plot. It stars Matthew Solomon as DropTheMike, a controversial vlogger and social media celebrity, who is haunted by strange forces when he takes his weekly vlog to a reputedly cursed hotel in order to gain more subscribers. It stars John Savage, Sam Valentine, Tim Drier, Caitlin Grace and Kelsey Griswold, and is produced by Viscape Arts in association with Branded Pictures Entertainment.

The film had its world premiere at Burbank International Film Festival on September 7, 2018, where it won the award for Best Horror/Thriller Feature Film. It was released in select theaters and drive-ins in the United States on June 19, 2020, and releases on VOD September 1.

== Plot ==
The entire movie is shown through a single screencast recorded by an unknown individual. The user views a series of vlogs made by DropTheMike, a controversial vlogger who disappeared shortly after visiting the Lennox Hotel in downtown Los Angeles. The user repeatedly receives messages from friends of Mike, most of which the user ignores.

DropTheMike receives a sponsorship offer for $250,000 if he gains 50,000 new subscribers. Mike decides to spend the Halloween weekend at the Lennox Hotel in downtown Los Angeles. The hotel has been plagued by tens of suicides and murders since its founding. Most recently, Korean tourist Meghan Kim's burned corpse was found in the hotel's boiler room after security camera footage showed her acting erratically in the hotel elevator.

Mike interviews Wallace Fleischer, an author who tells him about David Olmos, a serial killer and Satanist who resided at the Lennox Hotel in the '80s. The next day, DropTheMike, Nic (his editor), Chris (Mike's religious director of photography), and Dani (sound and camera, and Chris' friend and unrequited love) arrive at the hotel. Mike, Dani, and Chris reside on the top floor in the room where Olmos committed his murders while Nic resides next door to edit the vlogs.

On the second day, Mike and his crew attempt to enter the basement to reach the boiler room, losing their drone when they place it through the chained doors. A security guard, Tony, catches them, but reveals he is a fan of Mike and promises to give them the key to the basement.

Mike then researches the “Elevator Game” in which if one enters an elevator alone and presses floors in a specific sequence, they will enter another dimension. Concluding Meghan Kim attempted the ritual, Mike plays the game alone and seemingly encounters Kim's ghost. DropTheMike brushes the encounter off as an obsessive fan. After hearing ghostly knocking from their front door, Mike receives a Skype call from Jess, his fiancée, who announces her pregnancy to Mike. Shortly after celebrating, Chris checks in on Nic, finding her in a disturbed, self-harmful state. After seeing a decapitated ghost in the hallway, Chris calls for Mike and Dani, and they follow the ghost to the hotel roof. There, they find a satanic altar above their room with a platter holding an animal's tongue.

After the vlog, the mysterious user uploads the third night onto DropTheMike's channel. Mike seemingly recognizes a ghostly child in the hallway and proceeds to chase it. While Mike is gone, Chris and Dani are chased by the hacksaw-wielding ghost of Olmos. When Mike attempts to follow the child to Room 440, he finds himself teleported back to the top floor.

DropTheMike calls Wallace, who tells him that Room 440 belonged to a police detective who, after residing in the hotel, murdered his wife and brought his two sons to the hotel. After killing the eldest son, the detective chased the youngest son to the boiler room. The detective was then killed by a maintenance man who encountered the son. After the interview, Chris is attacked in the bathroom by a ghost from his childhood, and leaves the hotel. Mike convinces Dani to stay, revealing that he was an adopted child.

After witnessing an elderly woman jump from the hotel window, Mike and Dani are chased by a drug dealer they had filmed earlier, and are both saved by Chris. A traumatized Dani leaves with Chris. Mike checks in on Nic and stops her from jumping out of the window of her room. DropTheMike then returns a delirious Nic to her mother and sister. Now alone in the hotel, Mike receives the basement key from Tony. Mike decides to proceed to the boiler room, despite receiving a call from Jess pleading for him to come home. Starting a livestream, DropTheMike receives a garbled phone call from Wallace, who reveals that Mike is the surviving biological son of the police detective.

Mike enters the boiler room and finds the missing drone above where Kim's corpse was. Following ghostly sounds, Mike finds a laptop displaying his broadcast in real time and Tony's notebook, which is filled with occult imagery. Mike is then chased by various ghosts from the hotel, finds a dead body, and runs out of the hotel in a panic.

Back home, DropTheMike starts a livestream where he announces that he will be on a hiatus. He also states his plans to make a documentary on the homeless situation in downtown Los Angeles, feeling a need to put something more positive out into the world. Shortly afterward, his power goes out. Finding his house surrounded by shadow people, Mike is confronted by Tony and Kim, who hand him his fiancée's severed head. Mike shortly afterward disappears.

The user then views the channel of TerribleTyler, a young vlogger who announces his plans to break into DropTheMike's house to investigate. Under Mike's account, the user posts a comment on the video stating “Can't wait to meet you, Tyler :)”. As the comment section ponder about Mike's supposed return, the user logs off, revealing Mike's blurred face on the laptop's camera.

== Cast ==
- Matthew Solomon as DropTheMike
- John Savage as Wallace Fleischer
- Sam Valentine as Danni
- Tim Drier as Chris
- Caitlin Grace as Nic
- Kelsey Griswold as Jess
- Christopher Martin as Security Guard
- Karan Sagoo as Alley Drug Dealer
- Ethan Alexander as David Olmos
- Sarah Chang as Meghan Kim

== Production ==
=== Development ===
Producers Antoine Le, Todd Klick, Matthew Ryan Brewbaker and Greg Berlant developed the story together basing Followed's fictional Lennox Hotel on the Cecil Hotel, famous for its many instances of death and violence, including the death of Elisa Lam, as well as murders by serial killers Jack Unterweger and Richard Ramirez. The producers were also inspired by Creepypasta, and based the main character, DropTheMike, on famous vloggers such as Logan Paul and PewDiePie, who seemingly use controversy to attract subscribers to their platforms.

=== Casting ===
In order to accurately depict realistic personalities, the producers auditioned and cast Matthew Solomon as DropTheMike, Caitlin Grace as Nic and Tim Drier as Chris before the script was written. Once these roles were cast, writer Todd Klick then used the actors' specific mannerisms and approach to the characters as a guideline for his script.

=== Filming ===
Followed was filmed in 12 days on a 144-page script. Two separate hotel locations were used to depict the Hotel Lennox: the Hayward Manor Apartments in Downtown Los Angeles, and the Hotel Normandie in Koreatown, Los Angeles. Locations also included Skid Row where homelessness was used as both a literal and thematic backdrop for the story.

== Release ==
Followed had its world premiere on September 7, 2018, at the 2018 Burbank International Film Festival in Burbank, California. It was subsequently selected into the 2018 Hollywood Independent Filmmaker Awards and 2018 Sydney Indie Film Festival where it won Best Horror/Thriller Feature Film at both festivals. It was acquired by Global View Entertainment and its US-nationwide drive-in theater release is June 19, 2020.

== Reception ==
=== Box office ===
Followed grossed $152,825 from 44 theaters in its opening weekend, finishing first among reported films. It finished in second the following weekend with $77,609. Followed grossed $539,648 from its theatrical run.

=== Critical response ===
Reviews from initial critics were overall positive, praising the film for its social commentary on Millennials and social media as well as its unique take on the genre. Aedan Juvet of Bleeding Cool described the film as: "an innovative take" on the growing popularity of modern horror. On review aggregator website Rotten Tomatoes, the film holds an approval rating of 73% based on 22 reviews, with an average rating of 6.6/10.

=== Awards ===
| Year | Awards | Category | Recipients | Result |
|---|---|---|---|---|
| 2018 | Burbank International Film Festival | Best Horror/Thriller Feature Film | Antoine Le | Won |
| 2018 | Burbank International Film Festival | Best Actor | Matthew Solomon | Nominated |
| 2018 | Burbank International Film Festival | Best Actress | Sam Valentine | Nominated |
| 2018 | Hollywood Independent Filmmaker Awards | Best Horror Feature Film | Antoine Le | Won |
| 2018 | Sydney Indie Film Festival | Best Thriller Feature Film | Antoine Le | Won |
| 2018 | Sydney Indie Film Festival | Best Editing Feature Film | Matthew Ryan Brewbaker | Won |
| 2018 | Sydney Indie Film Festival | Best Special Effects | Justin Chandra | Won |
| 2018 | Sydney Indie Film Festival | Best Screenplay | Todd Klick | Nominated |
| 2018 | Sydney Indie Film Festival | Best Cinematography | Nelson Pun | Nominated |

== See also ==
- Internet celebrity
- Urban legend
- Marble Hornets
- Lonelygirl15
- Casey Neistat
- List of YouTubers
- Unfriended
- The Den
- Searching
