= Ke'er =

Ke'er may refer to following individuals of which Hanzi name can be transliterated to Hanyu Pinyin:

- Elisa Lam (藍可兒; pinyin: Lán Kě'ér; 1991-2013), see Death of Elisa Lam
- Kani, Gifu (可児; pinyin: Kě'ér), Japan
