= Todd Klick =

American writer

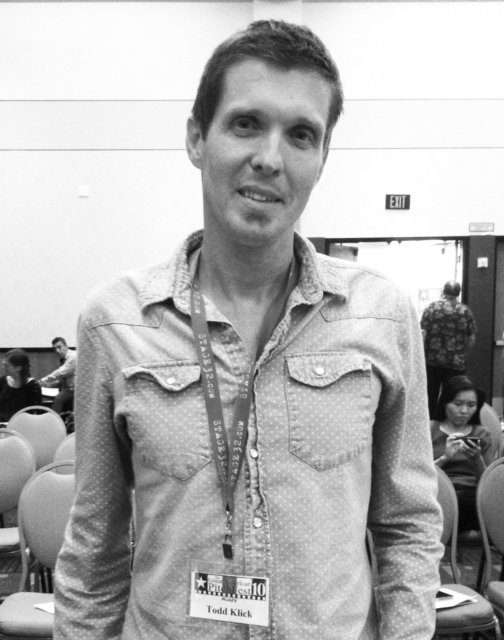
- Klick in 2013
- Born: Todd Klick; Lebanon, Pennsylvania, U.S.
- Occupations: Writer, Screenwriter, Producer, Director
- Known for: Author of Something Startling Happens: The 120 Story Beats Every Writer Needs To Know; Screenwriter of Followed (2019)

Todd Klick is an American author and filmmaker based in Los Angeles. His book, Something Startling Happens: The 120 Story Beats Every Writer Needs To Know became a #1 bestseller on Amazon.com for Screenwriting and Writing Skills. It is also a bestseller for his publisher, Michael Wiese Publications. Klick is also the author of the eBook The Screenwriter's Fairy: The Universal Story Within All Movie Stories (a very brief fable), which has also been #1 on Amazon for Screenwriting., and is a contributing author for the #1 bestselling Tarcher-Penguin book, Now Write! Science Fiction, Fantasy and Horror: Speculative Genre Exercises from Today’s Best Writers and Teachers.

Klick leads seminars at screenwriting conferences and symposiums and is a contributor to The Huffington Post and MovieMaker.

== Early life ==
Klick grew up in rural Pennsylvania, which he writes about in his Huffington Post article, Goodbye Ray Bradbury, My Friend.

== Something Startling Happens ==
Something Startling Happens: The 120 Story Beats Every Writer Needs To Know is a minute-by-minute analysis of successful movies and what their stories share in common each minute. It reached #1 on Amazon for Screenwriting and Writing Skills in December 2011 after its October 2011 release, and has been a consistent best-seller in that genre.

The book was inspired by Blake Snyder's book on screenwriting, Save The Cat! The Last Book on Screenwriting You'll Ever Need.

== The Screenwriter's Fairy Tale ==
The nonfiction ebook The Screenwriter's Fairy Tale: The Universal Story Within All Movie Stories (a very brief fable) is a 13-page ebook fable that shows how archetypal story patterns work in each act of a screenplay.

== Works ==
=== Filmography ===
- Rough Cut: The Murder of Randi Trimble (2009)
- Followed (2019)

=== Bibliography ===
- Something Startling Happens: The 120 Story Beats Every Writer Needs To Know (2011)
- The Screenwriter's Fairy Tale: The Universal Story Within All Movie Stories (2012)
- Screamin' Willie & The Lynchin' Tree (2013)

=== Articles ===
- How Spielberg And Shakespeare Found Their Groove, Huffington Post (2012)
- Something Startling Happens (The Missing Chapter), The Writer's Store (2012)
- Goodbye Ray Bradbury, My Friend, Huffington Post (2012)
- 10 Beats To A Better Beginning, MovieMaker (2012)
