= Death of Noah Donohoe =

2020 death in Belfast, Northern Ireland

Noah Donohoe
- Born: 25 November 2005; Strabane, Northern Ireland
- Died: 21 June 2020 (aged 14); Belfast, Northern Ireland
- Cause of death: Drowning
- Body discovered: 27 June 2020
- Education: St Malachy's College
- Website: The Noah Donohoe Foundation

On 21 June 2020, Noah Peter Donohoe, a 14‑year‑old schoolboy from Belfast, Northern Ireland, went missing while cycling in north Belfast. He was found deceased six days later in a storm drain, and a post‑mortem examination concluded that he died by drowning.

The circumstances of his disappearance and death, the handling of the police investigation, and delays in releasing key evidence have led to widespread public concern and sustained advocacy. An inquest concluded in September 2026 with a narrative verdict that identified failings by the Department for Infrastructure and the PSNI.

== Background ==
Noah Peter Donohoe was born on 25 November 2005 in Strabane, County Tyrone, Northern Ireland, and was the only son of Fiona Donohoe and Emmanuel Djakpa. He attended St Malachy's College. Friends described him as "the smartest kid" and said "everyone liked him".

== Disappearance and discovery ==
Locations
1 03:34 am Fitzroy Avenue - Donohoe leaves home returning at 04:08 am. 5:40 pm Donohoe leaves home again.
2 Ulster University where Donohoe's backpack was found.
3 6:08 pm Northwood Drive - final CCTV sighting alive.
4 Cavehill Visitor Centre.

On 21 June 2020, Donohoe left his home on Fitzroy Avenue at approximately 3:34 am, wearing flip-flops, a T-shirt, and shorts, and carrying headphones. CCTV footage showed him turning towards Queen's University. He later returned at 4:08 am, barefoot and without his headphones.

Later that day, at approximately 5:40 pm, Donohoe left home again, telling his mother he planned to cycle to Cavehill to meet friends. He was carrying a rucksack and wearing a helmet, jacket, hoody, shorts, and trainers. CCTV footage later showed him travelling through Belfast city centre, gradually discarding personal items including his rucksack and mobile phone.

At approximately 5:59 pm, Donohoe was seen falling from his bicycle, as captured on CCTV and reported by eyewitnesses. He continued riding through residential streets in north Belfast, including York Road, Skegoniell Avenue, and Northwood Crescent. His bicycle was later found outside a property on Northwood Road, and other items including his helmet and clothing were recovered from nearby locations.

The final confirmed sighting occurred at approximately 6:08 pm, when CCTV captured Donohoe on Northwood Drive. Additional footage showed him unclothed, leaving his bicycle and walking towards a stream behind a nearby residence. The stream led to a culvert inlet on land owned by the Department for Infrastructure, which was gated and not publicly accessible. The inlet was covered by a metal grille but was not padlocked. The land was not a public park and was accessible only to certain residents.

Later that evening, at approximately 9:44 pm, Fiona contacted the police to report him missing. A coordinated search operation followed, involving emergency services and volunteers.

On 27 June 2020, Donohoe's body was recovered from a storm drain in north Belfast. A post-mortem examination concluded that he had died by drowning. As part of the wider investigation, a man was jailed for three months in January 2021 after pleading guilty to stealing Donohoe's rucksack on the day he disappeared and attempting to pawn his laptop. He told police he had found the bag near Ulster University buildings in Belfast city centre. The court said there was no link between the individual and Donohoe's death.

=== Funeral ===
On 1 July 2020, a private Requiem Mass was held at St Patrick's Church in Belfast, attended by close family members including Donohoe's mother Fiona, grandparents, and aunts. Due to COVID-19 restrictions, only ten people were permitted to attend. During the service, the officiating priest, Fr Michael McGinnity, relayed Fiona's tribute, describing her son as "a beautiful soul with a beautiful mind" who had "poured a whole lifetime of love into my life in 14 short years".

Following the service, the funeral cortege travelled to St Malachy's College, where Donohoe had been a pupil. Students formed a guard of honour at the college gates, and members of the Community Rescue Service, who had assisted in the search effort, lined the route.

== Inquest ==
=== Initial concerns and background evidence ===
On the first day of the inquest, the jury heard a recording of a call made by his mother, Fiona, to police on the evening Donohoe disappeared. In the call, she told the handler that she was increasingly concerned about his welfare and felt that something was "not right", noting changes in his mood and behaviour during the previous week. She said he had become preoccupied with the book 12 Rules for Life by Jordan Peterson and had been carrying out tasks to help her that he would not normally undertake. Fiona stated that she was "extremely concerned" about his mental health during that period. Later in the proceedings, the jury was told about messages Donohoe had sent to a friend in the week before he disappeared. In them, he spoke about his "emotions and mental health" and said he wanted to be more "honest" about himself. The friend told the jury he regarded the messages as reflective rather than concerning and said he did not believe they related to Donohoe's sexuality. He added that Donohoe had seemed positive when they last met and had spoken at length about 12 Rules for Life, which he described as "the focus of conversation".

=== CCTV footage tracing Donohoe's movements ===
The inquest was shown CCTV recordings capturing Donohoe walking along University Street and Dudley Street during the period he was away from his home in the early hours of 21 June. In these images he was barefoot. The footage also indicated that he initially walked in the direction of the Queen's University Belfast area but later returned from the Ormeau Road side.

CCTV evidence was shown to the jury tracing Donohoe's movements after he left his home with his bicycle. The footage followed him through south Belfast towards the city centre and into the Shore Road area, at points travelling on both the road and the footpath. By the end of the sequence he was no longer clothed. Fiona stepped out of the courtroom while the recording was played and returned once it had finished. A lawyer assisting the coroner said one of the images appeared to show Donohoe losing his balance near the North Queen Street junction before getting back on the bicycle and continuing.

Detective Sergeant Gardiner told the inquest that, when Criminal Investigation Department (CID) took over three days after Donohoe went missing, he became responsible for gathering CCTV and treated securing footage from the area of Donohoe's last sighting as urgent. Jurors were shown a nine‑minute compilation tracing Donohoe's route, including footage of him cycling naked near the end of his journey. Gardiner said police were trying to understand how Donohoe became separated from his belongings and were aware of concerns about his mental health raised in his mother's 999 call. He confirmed that officers had considered whether Donohoe might have suffered a head injury and said the possibility of drugs or "mood altering substances" had been part of the investigative "conversations". Gardiner also said he did not know at the time that a house on Northwood Road had rear‑facing CCTV and only learned of that footage during the inquest, adding that the material gathered did not indicate "any third‑party involvement". Former chief superintendent Clark said he told the public that police believed Donohoe may have fallen from his bicycle and become disorientated, and that officers did not suspect foul play, comments he said were intended to counter what he described as "baseless rumours".

CCTV shown to the inquest also captured the man who later pleaded guilty to stealing Donohoe's rucksack standing outside the Queen's Quarter building on University Street as Donohoe cycled past shortly after leaving home. The inquest was told there was no interaction between them, and an earlier court hearing had described the theft as opportunistic. Counsel for Fiona described it as "a massive coincidence" that the same man later found Donohoe's laptop on the opposite side of the city near the end of Donohoe's route. A reporting restriction relating to the man was lifted, and his barrister said CCTV placed him on Botanic Avenue shortly after Donohoe's last confirmed sighting, meaning he could not have encountered Donohoe in north Belfast. Counsel for the coroner noted that this was the first time it had been set out clearly that the point was not in dispute. The same man also told the inquest that he had not been truthful with police about what he intended to do with Donohoe's laptop and accepted that he might have planned to sell it.

A woman who later attempted to exchange Donohoe's laptop at a Belfast shop also gave evidence. She had been convicted in 2022 of handling stolen goods, and told the jury she had been with the man who admitted stealing the rucksack when he suggested selling the laptop to obtain money for drugs. She said earlier comments she made to police about Donohoe being injected with drugs had come from a single "rumour" within the homeless community, and that she had felt pushed into signing a statement that implied she knew more about the case.

Constable Day told the inquest he reviewed CCTV the day after Donohoe disappeared but did not identify him on footage from either the Grove Wellbeing Centre or a funeral directors on York Road. The inquest holds footage from the wellbeing centre showing Donohoe cycling past shortly before he vanished, but the funeral‑home recording is no longer available.

A 2025 view from the same camera position shows it would have covered the main road, the front of the wellbeing centre, and the entrance to Skegoneill Avenue. Counsel for Fiona argued this meant the camera should also have captured Donohoe and that Day had "missed" him. He replied: "I didn’t see him on the footage I viewed."

The court heard there were timing discrepancies on the CCTV, which Day accepted he had not checked, agreeing this would be "pretty fundamental policing". He described the Grove footage as "very poor". Justice Rooney said: "It was missed, it is quite clear it was missed." The inquest also viewed CCTV of Donohoe cycling along the Lower Ormeau Road earlier that day.

=== Eyewitness accounts from North Belfast ===
A witness told the inquest she had driven past a cyclist crouched beside a parked car on North Queen Street. She said he did not appear injured but "looked embarrassed", stood up quickly, and cycled away without lifting a green jacket lying nearby. She added that he seemed "steady enough" as he rode off.

Further eyewitness accounts described Donohoe's condition as he moved through north Belfast. A woman who saw him fall from his bicycle on North Queen Street, close to the point where it meets York Road, said it looked like a "fairly bad fall", but he got up quickly, brushed his knee, and rode on, adding that she had never told police he struck his head; her son, who was in the car with her, gave evidence consistent with her account. A motorist who passed him moments later said he "looked startled" but did not appear injured. A resident in Northwood Crescent said she briefly saw a boy cycling past while adjusting his helmet straps and later found the helmet discarded near a lamppost. A separate driver reported seeing him "sway" on the bike several times as he continued along North Queen Street.

A woman living on Northwood Road said that she and her son saw a naked cyclist pass their window and initially assumed it was an adult playing a "Father’s Day prank". She said she did not realise it was a teenager and did not contact police at first because she believed it was "someone drunk or on drugs". When they checked the street shortly afterwards, they found clothing and footwear scattered on the pavement and Donohoe's bicycle left at the top of the cul‑de‑sac. They later contacted police after seeing the missing‑person appeal. Her son also gave evidence, saying the sighting happened "in a flash" and lasted only "a second or two". He said he later noticed the bicycle and items of clothing lying at different points along the street. He told the inquest he believed he phoned police twice that night, although no record of those calls appears in the system until the following evening; he maintained that he had made the earlier calls and said he "didn’t see the point in coming up here and lying" and only wanted to help the family get answers. The inquest heard that police did not seek a formal statement from him until two years later, and he agreed to assist with efforts to retrieve relevant social‑media posts and phone records.

Another resident, who discovered the bicycle at the end of her driveway, said she first assumed it had been left by a local child but thought its position was unusual. After seeing the police appeal the following day, she recognised the description and reported it, saying the bike looked as though it had been "abandoned". A woman on Premier Drive said she heard someone try the back‑door handle around 3:00 am on 22 June 2020, the morning after Donohoe was reported missing. She described the noise as "really, really loud and hard" and hid because she thought someone was trying to break in. She was unaware at that stage that Donohoe was missing. The inquest also heard that officials later confirmed there was no walkable route from the culvert to Premier Drive.

A second resident from Premier Drive told the inquest she heard two screams shortly after midnight on the night Donohoe disappeared. She said the first noise prompted her to go downstairs to alert her husband, and a second scream followed. The couple then went out to their back garden to check the area. She described the sound as "quite faint" and said she had "no doubts" it was a human voice. Her husband said he also heard what he described as a "muffled scream", though he found it difficult to judge where it came from. He added that he later woke around 3:00 am after seeing a brief "white flash" outside, which he assumed was a torch.

Another resident, from Northwood Parade, said she heard a single "high‑pitched scream" in the early morning hours of 22 June. She said it was sudden, loud enough to make her look outside, and she was "pretty confident" it was a scream rather than an animal. A Northwood Road resident reported seeing items of clothing and shoes on the street that evening, while another neighbour saw a bicycle positioned at the edge of a driveway and a helmet nearby the next day.

=== Initial‑response police evidence ===
Sergeant Murphy, who spoke with Fiona on the night Donohoe was reported missing, said she described him as over‑emotional in the days beforehand, saying he had been acting "strange" and had been "hugging and kissing" her more often and telling her he loved her. She said his disappearance was "totally out of character" and that he would normally be home well before 10 pm. Murphy said a search of the house showed nothing to suggest Donohoe planned not to return, and that he had no previous police contact or history of self‑harm. The case was initially treated as medium‑risk before being upgraded to high-risk.

Constable Budden, who had also spoken with Fiona, said she told him she feared he might have harmed himself, although there was nothing to indicate he had intended to. He said she described him as "in a low mood" and "very weepy" before he went missing, and that she worried he might have been bullied after finding the word "gay" written in different handwriting in his homework diary. Budden said he later became aware that Donohoe had searched online for biblical references and had looked up Cavehill on the day he disappeared. Budden was also questioned about differences between his recollection and what had been recorded at the time. He said certain details had stood out to him when preparing his later statement and accepted that people can "amplify" positions during emergencies.

Constable Wilson, one of the first officers to attend Northwood Road, told the inquest he saw no indication of a crime when he examined the bicycle, helmet, and clothing found along the street. He said residents reported seeing "a black male child naked" and confirmed that the items belonged to Donohoe. He was asked why he had not recorded the detail about the child being naked in his notes and said he had passed the information on verbally to colleagues. He added that the clothing showed no signs of damage and there was no blood at the scene.

Constable Morrow told the inquest he did not carry out CCTV enquiries during the early search. He said a resident on Northwood Road showed him footage of Donohoe cycling naked and mentioned a small timestamp difference, but he did not check this further, saying such work is normally done when footage is seized. He said he was "happy enough with the information" and passed it to colleagues. Morrow also accepted he did not check the outside of the house for the camera's position, and it later emerged there was a second camera covering a rear entrance.

Constable Thompson said he received similar details from the resident and did not check for camera locations, saying his priority was finding a missing boy who appeared to be naked and had gone into "a dense wooded area".

Sergeant Hutchings, the PSNI search adviser, described how early decisions were made with very limited information. He said he initially noted reports that Donohoe had come off his bicycle and that officers considered the possibility that he was "missing voluntarily", which he had recorded as the first scenario in his notes. Hutchings told the inquest he was reluctant to act on unconfirmed suggestions about possible CCTV sightings and wanted clear identifications before directing searches.

Hutchings was later questioned about the timing of the culvert search. A barrister for Fiona suggested there had been a "12‑hour delay", but he said officers did not expect to find Donohoe in the tunnel at that stage and were concentrating on wider searches across Belfast. He said there was "nothing to suggest he was in there", describing the culvert check as a way of ruling it out. Hutchings added that he only identified the culvert when he returned to duty the following morning, having previously been told only about "a stream", and said the investigation was later broadened to include checks on known sex offenders, although there remained no indication of third‑party involvement.

A PSNI missing‑persons specialist told the inquest that the investigation had been "very good" and taken under firm control at an early stage, with only technical issues noted in his internal review. He said the decision to refer the case to CID reflected the seriousness with which it was treated and rejected suggestions that officers assumed Donohoe would return, noting that it was designated high‑risk within hours. A separate review had referred to "missing‑person fatigue", which he believed related to routine reports involving children in care rather than this case. The inquest also heard that the fire service was not asked to assist at the culvert because the operation was treated as a search rather than a rescue, and that cooperation between the services in such incidents is typically limited. Officers were working 12‑hour shifts at the time due to Covid‑19.

Inspector Bell, the duty sergeant during the initial phase of the PSNI search, defended how he handled CCTV gathered after Donohoe disappeared. He was questioned about footage from a house at the end of Northwood Road, including a rear‑facing camera that was not examined in detail at the time.

Front‑facing footage had shown Donohoe naked, leaving his bicycle and moving behind nearby houses. Bell said he also viewed the rear footage on a mobile phone and did not believe it added anything significant, describing the chances of it showing something useful as "highly unlikely". He thought the view towards the area behind the garden would have been blocked by a fence around 6ft high.

The jury was shown a re‑enactment of what the rear camera might have captured near the culvert. Counsel suggested it showed movement and possibly a figure. Bell said this could be explained by the height of the person in the demonstration, who was taller than Donohoe.

Bell was also asked about how information from Donohoe's phone was handled. He said it was only one part of a wider search across Belfast and emphasised that CCTV work does not guarantee results, noting that access to some premises was restricted during Covid‑19.

Trevor Cooke, a PSNI forensic adviser, told the inquest he attended after Donohoe's body was recovered from the storm drain nearly a week after the disappearance. Rising water meant the tunnel had been evacuated and the body moved above ground. He said it was "badly contaminated with dirty water and dirt", with scuffing at the knees and elbows, and that nail scrapings and hair combings were taken.

Cooke said the pathologist later requested a water sample, but he had not taken one on the day because it was unsafe to re‑enter the tunnel. He stressed the tide made access impossible – "We couldn't go in, full stop" – and that "the important thing was Noah himself". He believed there were limited forensic opportunities at the recovery point and said his presence did not mean the area was being treated as a crime scene.

The inquest also heard that parts of the police search were affected by Covid‑19 restrictions. Bell said officers were "very committed" to finding Donohoe but faced poor‑quality footage and delays accessing CCTV because many businesses had reduced staffing.

Kitchen, who joined when CID took over three days after the disappearance, focused on finding "a second sighting" after the confirmed image at Northwood Road. He believed a nearby house had only one camera and was unaware of any request to check for others near the spot where Donohoe fell from his bicycle and left his coat, which has not been recovered. He prioritised Linear Park and nearby streets as they were closest to the last known location.

During the inquest, attention focused on inconsistencies in the evidence of PC Wharry regarding the green coat worn by Donohoe shortly before his disappearance. The coat has not been recovered. Wharry initially told the court that, in June 2020, he had been instructed to search the flat of the man later convicted of stealing Donohoe's belongings because police believed that person might also have had the coat.

The inquest heard, however, that neither Wharry's contemporaneous notes nor the two statements he later submitted mentioned the coat. When questioned, he said he had only become aware of it on the morning of his appearance at court, during a briefing at Musgrave police station. Counsel for Donohoe's mother challenged him on the discrepancy, and Wharry said he was "not able to answer".

The coroner briefly adjourned proceedings, describing the issue as a "serious matter". When the hearing resumed, Wharry said the briefing he received that morning related solely to the court's "running order". The coroner directed that no further questions on the coat would be taken until he had reviewed the transcript of Wharry's earlier evidence.

Following the evidence of the first‑response officers, the inquest also heard from Det Ch Insp Phillips, the senior investigating officer. He was asked whether there was any "plausible or reliable evidence" that Donohoe had interacted with another person before he went missing, and he replied: "No." The inquest was told that police reached this position after taking a range of issues into account, including the absence of any indication that he had come into contact with anyone during his final cycle, the time it took him to travel from home to the point where he was last seen, and officers’ description of his cycling as "purposeful". Phillips said the conclusion was "based on everything together".

=== Anonymous call received during the search ===
The inquest heard from a nurse, granted anonymity, about an anonymous call made to police three days after Donohoe went missing. The caller had claimed that a man arrived at a house in the Victoria Parade area during the evening of the disappearance with a laptop, a rucksack, a green coat and a book bearing Donohoe's name.

The man later admitted stealing Donohoe's rucksack after finding it that day. In statements to the inquest, he suggested the nurse was the anonymous caller. The recording of the call was played while she gave evidence.

The nurse said she had only recently learned her name had been passed to the inquest. She said she had visited a friend that evening to collect bingo books, knew the man's family but had not seen him for about 20 years, and denied making the call, saying she had been "tortured" by the allegation and insisting, "It’s not me". She told the coroner she had not been contacted or threatened before giving evidence.

=== Phone recovery and search‑phase evidence ===
A woman who found Donohoe's phone the next day said she discovered it inside railings at Castleton Park with a damaged screen. She brought it home to charge it and later saw missed calls from "Mum" and a police message asking for the device to be returned.

Detective Constable Keatley, who had been supporting Fiona during the search, said she believed there was a moment when Fiona realised her son might not be alive. Keatley said she had answered a call from his mother on the recovered phone so she would not think he had switched it back on, and later phoned to tell her that his clothes had been found. She said she sensed at that stage that Fiona believed he "possibly, maybe was no longer alive".

Keatley was praised for the support she provided but was also questioned about what was described as "very little progress" in gathering CCTV. It was put to the inquest that footage from the Grove Leisure Centre had not been collected for several days and appeared to have been missed in the first "critical" 24 hours. Police representatives said officers had focused their enquiries around Northwood Road once his last known location was established there.

Former PSNI inspector Menary told the inquest that rumours circulating online during the search had pushed unsupported claims about paramilitary or paedophile involvement. He said this online activity led some people to suspect that police were "covering up" information, and that it contributed to a small number of individuals becoming hostile or confrontational towards officers. He stressed that there has never been any evidence to support those claims.

Menary said his hazardous‑environment team began searching the storm‑drain system three days after Donohoe went missing, as part of wider searches that included Linear Park and Cavehill. He said the Linear Park search was briefly halted because several hundred people had gathered, with some acting in a "hostile" or "anti‑police" way and challenging officers about their presence.

Menary described the tunnel as cold, dark, and "completely black", with silt, debris, and "pockets of gas" that made it a potentially "explosive environment". He said none of the obstructions would have stopped someone moving through it, though parts required crawling, and that it would be "a very difficult place to survive if you were naked". The team first searched the upstream, non‑tidal section while calling out "Noah" and "police", and could not access the downstream section immediately because tidal flows from Belfast Lough restricted access. He also outlined the use of a specialist camera operated from above ground to inspect the tunnel.

Menary became emotional when describing the tunnel and what Donohoe would have faced. He said it was "completely black", with debris and cold water that made movement "exhausting" and at times required going "on all fours". A person could stumble with water "continually coming over you", which he said was "heartbreaking" to think about given Donohoe was alone and unclothed. The downstream section was "horrendous", with silt that "sucks your feet under" and "absolutely freezing" temperatures. He said his team were not told they were on a body‑recovery operation and that there was no evidence at that stage that Donohoe had entered the drain. Asked about urgency and delays, he accepted that obtaining maps took several hours but said his team were working within confined‑space limits while other searches were ongoing.

A member of the Community Rescue Service told the inquest that volunteers searched the Northwood Road area after Donohoe's bicycle was found. They located a culvert behind nearby houses and said its cover was unlocked, easy to open, and large enough for an adult to enter. Early searches focused on Cavehill, then widened to other areas after Donohoe's phone was recovered at a nearby play park.

The witness said Donohoe's body was recovered 625 metres downstream from the tunnel inlet, which was "far beyond" what he would have expected. A trained volunteer had entered the culvert during the early search but withdrew after a short distance for safety reasons. The tunnel runs downhill from Linear Park, passes Seaview football stadium, and then continues alongside the M2 before reaching a Translink depot just off the motorway, where the body was found.

He praised Donohoe's aunt for acting as the family's point of contact and said dense overgrowth near the disappearance site had to be cleared during the search. He added that members of the public were cooperative throughout.

The same witness said the search was made more difficult by "people from outside" who tried to insert themselves into the operation. He told the inquest that many locals were "well intentioned", but some individuals disrupted the work to the point that both the CRS and police asked crowds to move back so specialist teams could operate safely. He said this kind of behaviour sometimes appears in missing‑person searches and described it as a sort of "weekend pastime" for some people.

He characterised the search for Donohoe as "a unique situation", noting the unusually high level of public involvement, even though the overall method followed the pattern of other CRS operations. He also said the early attention on Cavehill was justified because Fiona had explained that her son intended to meet friends there on the day he disappeared.

The inquest heard that police records contained no suicide note or any indication that Donohoe planned to harm himself, and that a message had been sent to his phone by Fiona asking him to make contact. The witness said the culvert identified early in the search was considered a plausible hiding place for a boy who had been reported as naked when last seen. A Department for Infrastructure video shown to the inquest demonstrated that an adult could pass through the gap between the bars at the entrance. He ended his evidence by saying that Donohoe's family continued to be in the thoughts of CRS volunteers.

=== Digital‑platform and social‑media evidence ===
The inquest heard that Donohoe's Instagram account was placed into memorial status shortly after his body was recovered, preventing his mother from accessing it. Meta later supplied the coroner with the email address used in the request, which resembled that of a local family but contained minor errors.

A mother and her two teenage children, who were granted anonymity, denied any involvement. One teenager said he had "no idea" a request had been made in his name. His sister also denied contacting Meta and described learning of the issue in 2026 as "shocking". Their mother told the court she likewise had "no idea" how her family's email address became linked to the request.

Counsel for Fiona said the memorialisation left her "locked out" of material she regarded as important.

A digital expert also outlined Donohoe's online activity. The inquest was told that he had carried out a number of early‑morning searches involving biblical themes, along with further searches on the day he went missing relating to Christian ideas such as rejecting Satan and repentance. The expert accepted that the searches were "nothing above teenage curiosity" and said they did not give rise to concern.

=== Pathology and medical evidence ===
A pathologist told the inquest that Donohoe's death was consistent with drowning and that there was no evidence of third‑party involvement. Dr Turner said his body was recovered from the drain covered in silt, with bruises and abrasions that could have come from "stumbles or falls", and described the bruising to his forehead as "significant". She believed the forehead injury was more likely caused by striking a surface in the drain than by a fall from his bicycle. She added that Donohoe could have been "confused or disorientated" in the "pitch black" tunnel, that toxicology tests were negative, and that death likely occurred within hours of his disappearance.

Professor Crane and Dr Cary gave similar evidence. Crane said Donohoe may have become disorientated "not knowing how to get in or out", while Cary described the drain as a "cold confused space". Both agreed there was no indication of third‑party involvement.

Dr McSorley said he saw no injuries suggestive of an assault. He noted reddening to the forehead, "extensive maceration and peeling" of the hands and feet, and darkening to the knees. He believed the body had been in water for several days and said death could have occurred "up to six days previously".

A forensic scientist from Forensic Science Northern Ireland and Dr Elliott, a consultant forensic toxicologist, told the inquest that toxicology tests found no drugs or alcohol in the samples taken from Donohoe’s body. They said the possibility of certain substances being present "cannot be completely excluded", as some drugs break down before testing.

The witnesses explained that toxicology screening cannot cover every possible substance, noting that synthetic cannabinoids such as spice exist in hundreds of forms, many outside routine testing. Spice was described as a drug designed "to mimic cannabis".

Both experts said some "unstable" drugs can degrade quickly after death, and Dr Elliott added that certain substances may disappear "within hours". The samples were analysed several days after the body was recovered.

The forensic scientist said the level of testing matched what would be used in a murder investigation. Dr Elliott outlined how stimulant drugs can raise body temperature and may lead to the removal of clothing. He said the change in Donohoe's behaviour before his disappearance could be linked to spice or another drug, but might also relate to an underlying mental‑health issue, which he was not qualified to assess.

=== Expert evidence on the culvert ===
During the inquest, expert witnesses gave further evidence about the culvert where Donohoe was found. A hydrology report by Professor Roberts suggested he may have entered through the bars at the entrance and that the confined layout could have caused disorientation. Her assessment indicated that high tide occurred between about 11:30 pm and midnight on 21 June 2020, several hours after he was last seen, and that it was "very likely" he drowned at that point in the culvert.

Dr Cooper, a PSNI expert adviser, said the 2017 refurbishment installed a debris screen rather than a security screen, and that the spacing of the bars was wide enough for an adult to pass through. He described the decision not to install a security screen as "crucial to this case".

A further report by hydrologist Jeremy Benn, instructed by the Department for Infrastructure, said that screens do not remove the risk of flooding or injury and that the culvert's design was comparable to many other structures in Northern Ireland.

A Department for Infrastructure barrister said the department had been "satisfied" with the measures restricting access to the culvert, and the inquest examined whether any other sides of the structure could have been secured. Dr Cooper, a health and safety expert, said a "deterrent fence" could have been added behind the Northwood Road houses. The barrister said the adjoining residents are treated as "riparian owners", so officials could not put fencing on land they did not own. She referred to a departmental report that found no evidence of graffiti, litter, or other signs of unauthorised access, and said weekly inspections had not identified any. She said residents were "vigilant and alert". Dr Cooper said fixed measures would have provided continuous protection and described the culvert as a "very dangerous confined space". The barrister said there had been "no known public access" before 2020. Dr Cooper said risk assessment was "not a precise science".

=== Mental‑health evidence ===
A psychologist told the inquest that Donohoe was a "well‑adjusted" teenager, while the material she examined also pointed to possible traits linked to autism spectrum disorder and some signs of depression before he disappeared. She said she had also considered whether his behaviour on the day he went missing might have involved "a psychotic episode", adding that her conclusions were limited to the documents she had been given.

A psychiatrist gave a different view. After reviewing further information, he said he no longer believed Donohoe's death was the result of suicide and stated that he did not think there were "any mental health conditions prior to his disappearance".

Further evidence to the inquest indicated that Donohoe's mood had shifted in the days before he went missing, although the specialists said they were unable to explain the change, noting that there were "a lot of unknowns". They agreed there was no indication of an acute mental illness, no identifiable mental‑health disorder, and nothing to suggest he intended to take his own life. They also ruled out psychosis, head injury, drug use, hallucinations, delusional thinking, or a thought disorder as contributing factors. One expert highlighted that Donohoe leaving his home in the early hours of the morning was "particularly unusual", though there was no evidence of criminal exploitation. Another described the case as "a puzzling, bizarre event". The inquest also heard that medical information showed his mother had been dealing with various pressures at the time, but the specialists said there was not enough material to judge whether this had any bearing on his mental health, and that little was known about the mental‑health background of his paternal family.

=== Deliberations, adjournment, and verdict ===
Jury deliberations began on 30 June 2026. On 3 July, the coroner adjourned the inquest because four jurors were unavailable due to planned holidays, and said the hearing would resume later in the year. On 14 September, deliberations resumed and a juror was dismissed.

On 15 September, the jury gave a narrative verdict. The Department for Infrastructure was criticised for not realising that the public could access the underground water tunnel and had not placed warnings around the culvert. It also found that the installation of a debris screen rather than a storm screen meant that Donohoe could access the tunnel. He was found over 600 m downstream from where he was last seen, and his death happened between 7 pm and midnight. While the jury found that it was not "probable" that failings by the department led to his death, it said this was possible. It also identified 13 failings by the PSNI in the investigation into Donohoe's disappearance, but found that police errors did not contribute to his death given the timeline.

== Public response ==
Following Donohoe's death, public concern over the handling of the investigation and inquest led to widespread demonstrations and advocacy efforts. Supporters of the Donohoe family, including the activist group "Noah's Army", organised rallies, marches, and vigils.

In April 2025, hundreds of people gathered at Custom House Square and marched to Belfast City Hall, protesting against what speakers described as "negligence on an institutional scale" and demanding full transparency in the case. Earlier protests in 2022 also drew thousands to Belfast city centre, with participants calling for the release of withheld information and chanting slogans such as "Justice for Noah."

== Legacy ==
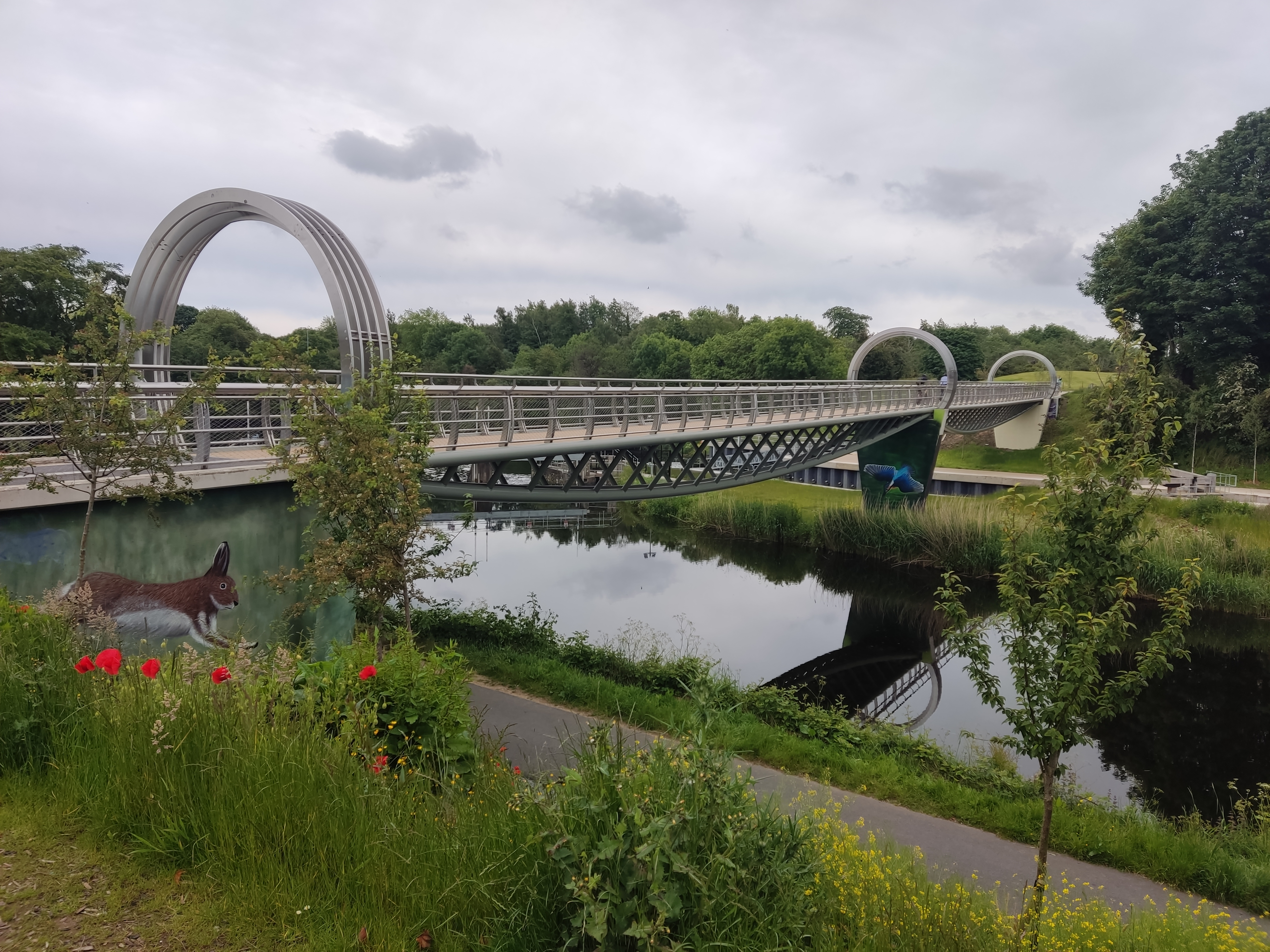
Lagan Gateway Bridge (The Noah Donohoe Bridge)

Fiona set up The Noah Donohoe Foundation in his memory.

In September 2022, Belfast City Council agreed to name the Lagan Gateway bridge in South Belfast the Noah Donohoe Bridge, following a public campaign and more than 1,000 submissions in support of the tribute. Fiona described the gesture as "beautiful and very fitting", noting that they had often walked the route together.

== See also ==
- Death of Elisa Lam, 2013 case of a woman found drowned in a rooftop water tank at a Los Angeles hotel, noted for widely circulated CCTV footage and subsequent online speculation about the circumstances.
