= Death of Elisa Lam =

2013 accidental drowning in Los Angeles

Elisa Lam
- 藍可兒
- Born: Lam Ho-yi; April 30, 1991; Vancouver, British Columbia, Canada
- Disappeared: January 31, 2013; Los Angeles, California, U.S.
- Died: c. February 1, 2013 (aged 21); Stay on Main, Los Angeles, California, U.S.
- Cause of death: Accidental drowning
- Body discovered: February 19, 2013; Stay on Main, Los Angeles, California, U.S.
- Education: University of British Columbia
- Occupation: Student

Chinese name
- Traditional Chinese: 藍可兒
- Simplified Chinese: 蓝可儿
- Hanyu Pinyin: Lán Kě'ér
- Yale Romanization: Làahm Hó-yìh
- Jyutping: Laam4 Ho2ji4

On February 19, 2013, the body of Canadian tourist Elisa Lam (born Lam Ho-yi; Chinese: 藍可兒) was recovered from a large cistern atop the Stay on Main hotel in downtown Los Angeles, where she had been a guest. She was last seen alive on January 31 and was reported missing by her parents on February 8. Her body was discovered by a hotel maintenance worker investigating complaints of flooding and low water pressure.

Interest in Lam's disappearance increased on February 13 when the Los Angeles Police Department released security camera footage of her behaving erratically in a hotel elevator on the day she was last seen alive. The video went viral. While an autopsy performed on February 21 was inconclusive in determining the manner of Lam's death, the Los Angeles County Coroner's office subsequently ruled the death an accident with bipolar disorder being a significant contributing factor, after blood analysis results revealed that she had not been taking her medication to control her behavior.

Guests at the Stay on Main sued the hotel over the incident and Lam's parents filed a separate suit later that year; the latter was dismissed in 2015. Some of the early Internet interest noted what were considered to be unusual similarities between Lam's death and the 2005 horror film Dark Water. The case has since been referenced in international popular culture and been the subject of several creative works.

== Background ==
Lam, the daughter of immigrants from Hong Kong, was a student at the University of British Columbia, although she was not registered at the beginning of 2013.

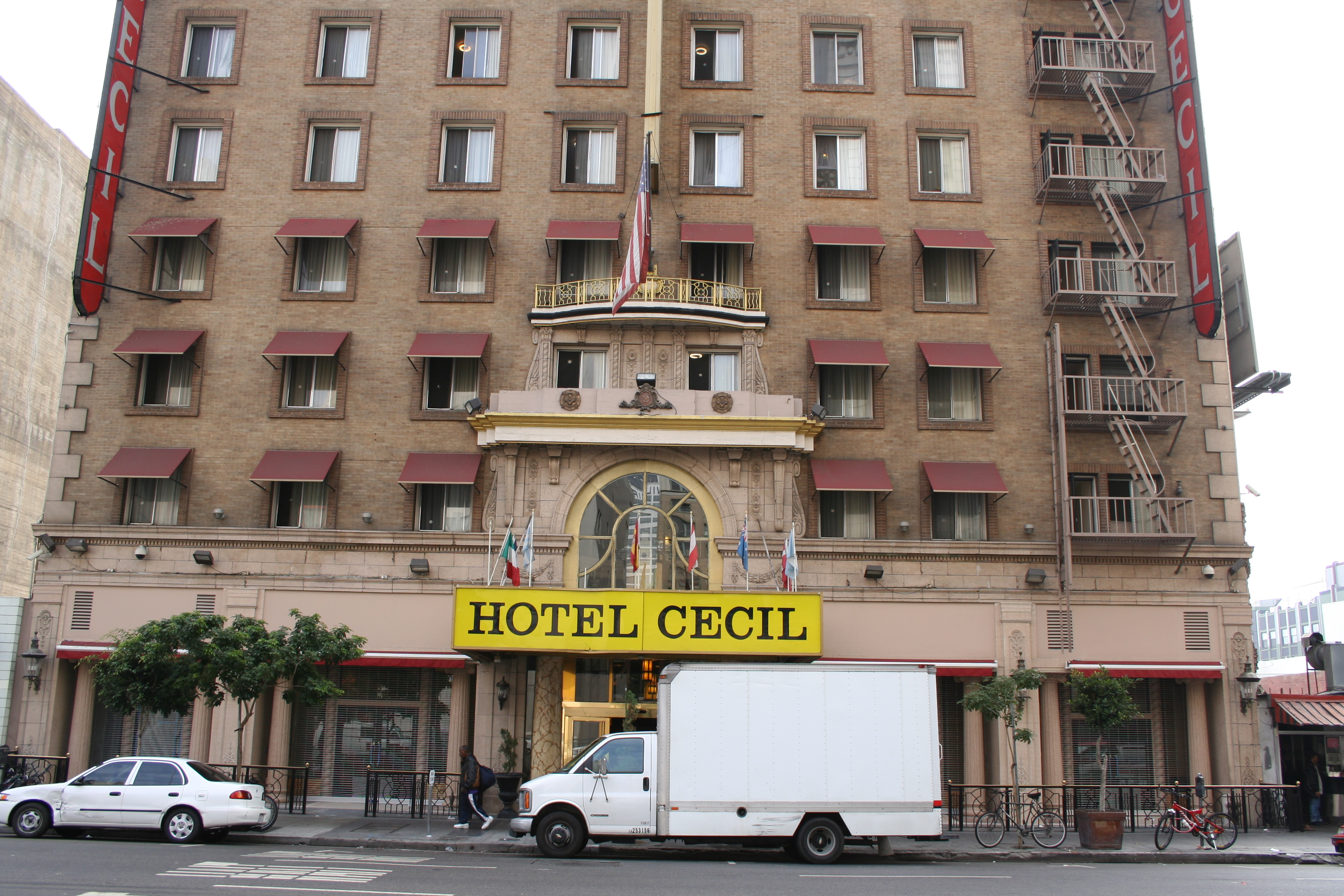
The Stay on Main, also known as the Cecil Hotel, where Lam was last seen alive

In mid-2010, Lam began a blog named Ether Fields on Blogspot. Over the next two years, she posted pictures of models in fashionable clothing and accounts of her life, particularly her struggle with mental illness. In a January 2012 blog post, Lam lamented that a "relapse" at the start of the current school term had forced her to drop several classes, leaving her feeling "so utterly directionless and lost." She titled her post "You're always haunted by the idea you're wasting your life" after a quotation from novelist Chuck Palahniuk. She used that quote as an epigraph for her blog. Lam worried that her transcript would look suspicious with so many withdrawals and that it would result in her being unable to continue her studies and attend graduate school.

A little over two years after Lam had started blogging, she announced she would be abandoning her blog for another she had started on Tumblr, "Nouvelle-Nouveau". Its content mostly consisted of fashion photos, quotes and a few posts in Lam's own words. The same Palahniuk quotation was used as an epigraph.

Lam had been diagnosed with bipolar disorder and depression. She had been prescribed several medications for her mental health issues: bupropion, lamotrigine, quetiapine, dextroamphetamine, and venlafaxine. According to her family, who reportedly kept her mental illness private, Lam had no history of suicidal ideations or attempts, although one report claimed she had previously gone missing for a brief period. Lam had a history of not taking her bipolar medications and, as a result, on several occasions suffered hallucinations that would cause her to hide under her bed for refuge; she was hospitalized at least once for one of these episodes.

For her trip to California, Lam traveled alone on Amtrak and intercity buses. She visited the San Diego Zoo and posted photos taken there on social media. On January 26, she arrived in Los Angeles. After two days, she checked into the Cecil Hotel, near Downtown's Skid Row. Lam was initially assigned a shared room on the hotel's fifth floor; however, her roommates complained about what the hotel's lawyer would later describe as "certain odd behavior" and Lam was moved to a room of her own after two days. According to Amy Price, the manager of the Cecil Hotel and Stay on Main at the time of Lam's disappearance, Lam was leaving notes for her roommates that said "go home" and "go away," and would lock the door to the room and require a password for entry. A few days before her disappearance, Lam attended a live taping of Conan in Burbank, but was escorted off the premises by security due to disruptive behavior.

== Disappearance ==
Lam contacted her parents in British Columbia daily while traveling up until the day she disappeared. On January 31, 2013, the day she was scheduled to check out of the Cecil and leave for Santa Cruz, her parents did not hear from her and called the Los Angeles Police Department (LAPD); her family flew to Los Angeles to help with the search.

Hotel staff who saw Lam that day said she was alone. Outside the hotel, Katie Orphan, manager of The Last Bookstore, was the only person who recalled seeing her that day. "She was outgoing, very lively, very friendly" while getting gifts to take home to her family, Orphan told CNN. "[She was] talking about what book she was getting and whether or not what she was getting would be too heavy for her to carry around as she traveled," Orphan added.

Police searched the hotel to the extent that they legally could. They searched Lam's room and had dogs go through the building, including the rooftop, but the dogs were unsuccessful in detecting her scent. "But we didn't search every room," Sgt. Rudy Lopez said later, "we could only do that if we had probable cause" to believe a crime had been committed. On February 6, a week after Lam had last been seen, the LAPD decided more help was needed. Flyers with her image were posted in the neighborhood and online. It brought the case to the public's attention through the media.

== Elevator video ==
The elevator video, to the point where Lam leaves without returning

On February 13, after another week with no sign of Lam, the LAPD released a video of the last known sighting of her taken in one of the Cecil's elevators by a video surveillance camera on January 31. In approximately two and a half minutes of footage, Lam, alone, makes unusual moves and gestures. She appears to press every button on the elevator panel, peers into the hallway, then leaves the elevator at one point while its doors remain open. When the doors fail to close after she returns, she leaves; the doors close later.

The video drew worldwide interest in the case due to Lam's strange behavior, and has been extensively analyzed and discussed. It was reposted widely, including on the Chinese video-sharing site Youku, where it accumulated 3 million views and 40,000 comments in its first 10 days. Many of the commentators found it unsettling to watch.

Several theories emerged to explain her actions. One was that Lam was trying to get the elevator car to move in order to escape from someone who was pursuing her. Others suggested that she might be under the influence of ecstasy or some other party drug, but none was detected in her body. When her bipolar disorder became known, the theory that she was having a psychotic episode also emerged.

Other viewers argued that the video had been tampered with before being made public. Besides the obscuring of the timestamp, they claimed, parts had been slowed down and nearly a minute of footage had been removed. This could have been done to protect the identity of someone who otherwise would be in the video, either related or not to the disappearance.

== Discovery of body ==
During the search for Lam, guests at the hotel began complaining about low water pressure. Some later claimed their water was colored black and had an unusual taste. On the morning of February 19, a hotel maintenance worker found Lam's body in one of four 1,000-gallon (3,785 L) tanks located on the roof providing water to guest rooms, a kitchen, and a coffee shop. Through the open hatch he saw Lam lying face-up in the water. The tank was drained and cut open since its maintenance hatch was too small to accommodate equipment needed to remove Lam's body.

On February 21, the Los Angeles coroner's office issued a finding of accidental drowning, with bipolar disorder as a significant factor. The full coroner's report, released in June, stated that Lam's body had been found naked; clothing similar to what she was wearing in the elevator video was floating in the water, coated with a "sand-like particulate". Her watch and room key were also found with her.

Lam's body was moderately decomposed and bloated. It was mostly greenish, with some marbling evident on the abdomen and skin separation evident. There was no evidence of physical trauma, sexual assault, or suicide. Toxicology tests showed traces consistent with prescription medication found among her belongings, plus nonprescription drugs such as Sinutab and ibuprofen. A very small quantity of alcohol (about 0.02 g%) was present, but no other recreational drugs. Investigators and experts have, however, noted that the concentration of her prescription drugs in her system indicated that she was under-medicating or had stopped taking her medications recently.

== Theories and speculation ==
The investigation determined how Lam died, but did not initially offer an explanation as to how she got into the tank in the first place. Doors and stairs that access the hotel's roof are locked, with only staff having the passcodes and keys, and any attempt to force them would supposedly have triggered an alarm. The hotel's fire escape could have allowed her to bypass those security measures; her scent trail was lost near a window that connected to it. A video posted to the Internet after Lam's death showed that the hotel's roof was easily accessible via the fire escape and that two of the lids of the water tanks were open.

Apart from the question of how she got on the roof, others asked if she could have gotten into the tank by herself. All four tanks were 4-by-8-foot (1.2 by 2.4 m) cylinders propped up on concrete blocks; there was no fixed access to them and hotel workers had to use a ladder to look at the water. They were protected by heavy lids that would be difficult to replace from within. The hotel employee who found the body said that the lid was open at the time, removing the issue of how she could have closed the lid from inside. Police dogs that searched through the hotel for Lam, even on the roof, shortly after her disappearance was noted, did not find any trace of her.

Proponents of the theory that the elevator video shows she was under the influence of illicit drugs are not dissuaded by their absence from the toxicology screen, suggesting that they might have broken down during the period of time her body decomposed in the tank or that she might have taken rare cocktails of such drugs that a normal screen would not detect. The very low level of her prescription drugs in her system, and the number of pills left in her prescription bottle, suggested she was under-medicating or had recently stopped taking her medication for bipolar disorder, which might have led to a psychotic episode.

The autopsy report and its conclusions were also questioned based on the incomplete information. For instance, it does not say what the results of the rape kit and fingernail kit were or even if they were processed. It also records subcutaneous pooling of blood in Lam's anal area, which some observers suggested was a sign of sexual abuse; one pathologist noted it could also have resulted from bloating in the course of the body's decomposition, and her rectum was also prolapsed. The coroner's pathologists were ambivalent about their conclusion that Lam's death was accidental.

After her death, her Tumblr blog was updated, presumably through Tumblr's Queue option that allows posts to automatically publish themselves when the user is away. Her phone was not found either with her body or in her hotel room. Whether the continued updates to her blog were facilitated by the theft of her phone, the work of a hacker, or through the Queue is not known; nor is it known whether the updates are related to her death.

== Litigation ==
In September 2013, Lam's parents filed a wrongful death suit, claiming the hotel failed to "inspect and seek out hazards in the hotel that presented an unreasonable risk of danger to (Lam) and other hotel guests" and seeking unspecified damages and burial costs. The hotel argued it could not have reasonably foreseen that Lam might have entered the water tanks and since it remained unknown how Lam was able to get into them, no liability could possibly be assigned for failing to prevent it. In 2015, the suit was dismissed.

== In popular culture ==
The circumstances of Lam's death have been compared to plot elements in the 2005 horror film Dark Water. The film, an American remake of an earlier Japanese film of the same name based on a 1996 short story by Koji Suzuki, a mother and daughter move into a rundown apartment building. A dysfunctional elevator and discolored water gushing from the building's faucets eventually lead them to the building's rooftop water tank, where they discover the body of a girl who had been reported missing from the building a year earlier.

The episode "Watershed" aired as that year's season finale of the ABC series Castle, in which a New York police detective and the title character, a mystery novelist, investigate crimes. In "Watershed", the duo pursue leads in the death of a young woman found dead in the rooftop water tank of the "Cedric Hotel" in Manhattan; among the evidence is a surveillance video of the woman taken in an elevator.

Another ABC series, How to Get Away with Murder, had a similar storyline. Over a series of flashbacks spread out across the first season, which began airing in 2014, it is revealed that a sorority girl missing at the start of the season was murdered and that her body has been hidden in the water tank on the roof of the sorority house.

In Hong Kong, from where Lam's family had originated, filmmakers were also inspired by the case. Nick Cheung made his directorial debut in 2014 with Hungry Ghost Ritual, a horror thriller that includes a scene in which a ghost terrorizes a young woman in an elevator, shot to look like security-camera footage similar to the footage of Lam in the Stay on Main's elevator. In mainland China, director Liu Hao announced a year after Lam's death that he would be making a film based on it; he went to Los Angeles himself and stayed for a few days at the Cecil doing research. Chinese media have reported that actress Gao Yuanyuan may be interested in playing Lam.

In March 2014 (a year after Lam's death) brothers Brandon and Philip Murphy sold a horror film script titled The Bringing, which used the investigation into her case as a backstory for a fictional investigating detective's slowly unraveling sanity. The duo were widely criticized for doing this so soon after her death. Danish director Nicolas Winding Refn was originally slated to direct the film, but in August it was announced that Jeremy Lovering would direct the film for Sony Pictures whenever production began.

The 2014 music video for Vancouver pop duo The Zolas' "Ancient Mars" is meant to be an idealized representation of Lam's last day, showing a young woman exploring Los Angeles and taking in simple pleasures. "It bugged me how tidily people explained away her disappearance with drugs or mental illness," said singer Zach Gray, who attended UBC around the same time and had a friend who knew Lam. "Though it's mostly fiction, we wanted people to see it and feel like she was a real girl and a familiar girl and not just a police report." Later that year, the American post-hardcore band Hail the Sun wrote "Disappearing Syndrome," also inspired by Lam's story. "It's such a chilling and eerie case," said the band's guitarist, Aric Garcia, in a Reddit Ask Me Anything.

In 2015, the media speculated that the fifth season of American Horror Story was inspired by Lam's death. Creator Ryan Murphy said he was "obsessed" with Cecil Hotel. He was inspired by the "bad publicity" the hotel had received over the years.

In 2017, Sun Kil Moon released the songs "Window Sash Weights" and "Stranger Than Paradise" as part of their album Common as Light and Love Are Red Valleys of Blood (2017); the songs specifically reference the event and promote the idea that it was a hoax. Band member Mark Kozelek said in an interview, "I've come to the conclusion that nobody died in the water tank. There’s no way to identify the girl on the elevator, as her face is pixelated."

In March 2016, BuzzFeed Unsolved studied the case, with hosts Ryan and Brent checking into the hotel to visit locations involved in the mystery.

Lam's case was incorporated into the plot of the 2018 horror film Followed, which shows the elevator footage, but instead has the body being found in a hotel's basement. Her behavior in the elevator was explained in the film as her playing "the Korean elevator game", in which pressing buttons in a certain order summons ghosts of people who died in the hotel.

The industrial rock band SKYND released a single, "Elisa Lam", in 2018, based on Lam's case. The music video recreates the elevator security footage.

YIIK: A Postmodern RPG, released in February 2019, had the character Semi Pak disappear in a similar way to Lam, kickstarting the plot of the game. This was criticized by many, who found it distasteful.

The Discovery+ show Ghost Adventures investigated Lam's death in a two-hour special launched on January 4, 2021.

On January 13, 2021, Netflix announced a four-episode docuseries titled Crime Scene: The Vanishing at the Cecil Hotel, which explores Lam's death and premiered on February 10, 2021.

It was used in the series Beyond Belief: Fact or Fiction in the episode Das Hotel des Grauens (The Hotel of Horror).

Lam's death serves as a minor plot device in Argentinian writer Mariana Enríquez's short-story "Un lugar soleado para gente sombría" (included in her 2024 homonymous collection published in Spanish by Anagrama), in which a journalist is tasked by her editor to write an article about a cult that holds regular séances by the hotel's water tank, in an effort to contact Lam's spirit and shed light on the circumstances surrounding her death.

Briefly, in Undertone, directed by Ian Tuason, Elisa Lam's case is mentioned without the use of her name with the line, "A ghost didnt't put her in that water tank, the poor girl was depressed, who knows?"

== See also ==
- Death of Noah Donohoe, 2020 case in Northern Ireland with some similar elements
- Death of Kenneka Jenkins, woman found dead in Chicago-area hotel freezer in 2017 after being seen on surveillance footage wandering around corridors and acting strangely
- Killing of Geetha Angara, unsolved 2005 New Jersey case in which the victim is believed to have been forced into a water tank where she drowned
- Killing of Debanhi Escobar, unsolved 2022 Nuevo Leon case in which the victim was found dead in a water tank
- Murder of Gordon Sanderson, unsolved 1977 case where a formerly unidentified Canadian man was found dead in a septic tank
- Deaths in February 2013
- List of drowning victims
- List of Internet phenomena
- Lists of solved missing person cases
- List of unusual deaths in the 21st century
