= J. Todd Harris =

American film producer (born 1959)

- Born: Jonathan Todd Harris; March 30, 1959 (age 66); United States
- Occupation: Film producer
- Spouse: Amy Powers
- Children: Jasper (born 1998) and Cole (born 2000)

Jonathan Todd Harris (born March 30, 1959) is an American film producer. Harris is the founder and president of the production studio Branded Pictures Entertainment. Harris has been a member of the Motion Picture Academy since 1999 and is a founding board member of the Napa Valley Film Festival.

== Life and career ==
J. Todd Harris was born in Pittsfield, Massachusetts, to Robert N. Harris and Eugenie (Schosberg) Harris. His parents soon divorced, and he and his mother moved to Manhattan, where he lived until 1973. While growing up on Manhattan's Upper East Side, he attended PS 6, PS 198, and the Allen-Stevenson School (grades 4–8). His mother remarried to Jeffrey Gross, and they moved with Todd and new son Jason Gross to Putnam Valley, New York. Todd attended James O'Neill High School in Highland Falls, New York, near West Point.

Harris attended Stanford University from 1977 to 1981. He earned his B.A. in political science and produced, directed, and acted in numerous campus stage productions. He also produced concerts for the university, as well as the first Stanford Film Festival in 1980. After graduating in 1981, he was named general manager of TheatreWorks, the Palo Alto-based repertory theater, where he worked for three years, eventually becoming managing director. In 1984, he returned to Stanford, where he earned his MBA in 1986.

Harris moved to Los Angeles in 1986 and worked at TriStar Television before starting his own development fund, called Skyline Entertainment Partners (inspired by his rustic college and business school residence in La Honda outside Palo Alto). He soon joined Davis Entertainment as an independent producer, where he stayed for 13 years, founding with partner John Davis the Davis Entertainment Filmworks, the company's independent film division. It was based at 20th Century Fox. There, he produced the first of many independent films, Denise Calls Up, which played the Cannes Film Festival's Critics Week and won a Special Mention for the Camera D'Or. For three years, he partnered with the actor Tim Daly in Daly-Harris Productions, based at Paramount Pictures. He went on to produce five Sundance Film Festival entries, including Bottle Shock and The Kids Are All Right. The Kids Are All Right was nominated for four Oscars, including Best Picture, won two Golden Globe Awards and received a 93% positive rating from Rotten Tomatoes across 205 reviews. In 2003, he joined Intellectual Properties Worldwide, where he executive produced Piranha 3D and a remake of It's Alive. The horror film Piranha 3D was produced for $24 million and earned over $83 million worldwide. Recent releases include "Shepherd," "12 Mighty Orphans," and "Stage Mother"

On the New York stage, Harris produced the musicals Heathers: The Musical, Doctor Zhivago and American Psycho. He is currently co-producing Buena Vista Social Club and "Soul Train," both of which are due to debut in the 2024-2025 Broadway season.

In 2014, he funded Branded Pictures Entertainment, an acquisitions and development company, focused on popular and acclaimed intellectual properties, including such titles as Danny and the Dinosaur, Rift, and Dance Dance Revolution.

He has taught producing at Chapman University and the Los Angeles Film School, and was an adjunct professor for Syracuse University's Los Angeles campus. He has also given private seminars around the country. He is a founding board member of the Napa Valley Film Festival and became a member of the Motion Picture Academy producers' branch in 1999. He joined The Broadway League in 2015 and Producers Guild of America in 2016. Harris has produced more than 50 films.

== Personal life ==
He lives in Los Angeles with his wife Amy Powers (married in 1997) and two sons Jasper (born in 1998) and Cole (born in 2000).

== Filmography ==
=== Producing filmography ===
- 1995: Denise Calls Up (producer)
- 1996: Cadillac Ranch (producer)
- 1997: Lewis & Clark & George (producer)
- 1997: Digging to China (producer)
- 1997: Bad Manners (producer)
- 1999: Dudley Do-Right (producer)
- 1999: Rites of Passage (producer)
- 1999: Seven Girlfriends (producer)
- 1999: Dinner at Fred's (executive producer)
- 2000: Urbania (producer)
- 2000: Little Richard (TV, executive producer)
- 2000: Partners in Crime (producer)
- 2000: Sordid Lives (producer)
- 2000: Tick Tock (producer)
- 2001: Jeepers Creepers (co-producer)
- 2001: Liberty, Maine (executive producer)
- 2002: 29 Palms (producer)
- 2002: The Burial Society (executive producer)
- 2003: Happy Hour (producer)
- 2003: Devil's Pond (producer)
- 2003: Latter Days (executive producer)
- 2004: Knots (executive producer)
- 2004: 50 Ways to Leave Your Lover (producer)
- 2005: At Last (producer)
- 2005: Supercross (producer)
- 2005: The Legend of Lucy Keyes (producer)
- 2006: Disappearances (producer)
- 2007: Black Irish (producer)
- 2008: Bottle Shock (producer)
- 2008: Shuttle (executive producer)
- 2008: Yonkers Joe (co-executive producer)
- 2008: It's Alive (executive producer)
- 2010: The Kids Are All Right (executive producer)
- 2010: Miss Nobody (producer)
- 2011: The Family Tree (producer)
- 2012: Crooked Arrows (producer)
- 2013: Hollywood Seagull (executive producer)
- 2014: Lucky Stiff (producer)
- 2016: So B. It (producer)
- 2017: Wheelman (executive producer)
- 2017: Being Rose (producer)
- 2019: SHEPHERD: The Story of a Jewish Dog (producer)
- 2019: Elsewhere (producer)
- 2019: Stage Mother (producer)
- 2019: Butter (producer)
- 2019: Followed (executive producer)
- 2019: Danny and the Dinosaur (producer)
- 2019: Rift (producer)
- 2019: 12 Mighty Orphans (producer)
- 2019: Dance Dance Revolution (producer)
- 2024: Lilly (producer)
- 2025: Soul on Fire (producer)

== Theatre and musical productions ==
- 2014: Heathers: The Musical (musical)
- 2014: Doctor Zhivago (musical)
- 2016: American Psycho (musical)
- Soul Train (musical)
- Maya Angelou (musical)
