= Killing of Debanhi Escobar =

2022 Mexican murder

- Location: 25.81624°N 100.2689°W; Disappearance: General Escobedo, Nuevo León, Mexico; Body found: Nueva Castilla Motel, General Escobedo, Nuevo León, Mexico
- Date: c. 9 April–22 April 2022
- Attack type: Femicide
- Victim: Debahni Escobar
- Perpetrator: Unknown
- Motive: Unknown

On 9 April 2022, Debanhi Susana Escobar Bazaldúa, an 18-year-old law student, disappeared from General Escobedo, Nuevo León, Mexico. Thirteen days later, on 22 April, her remains were found in a cistern of a motel in General Escobedo. The body had visible signs of violence.

The killing of Escobar triggered unrest in Mexico after a picture of her standing on a road on the night of her disappearance went viral. The case, investigated by the Nuevo León prosecutor's office as a femicide, happened amid a crisis of missing women in Nuevo León and throughout Mexico.

Escobar's killing shocked Mexican society and made international news. The disappearance case went viral and sparked protests in Mexico. The case is popularly known as the Debanhi Escobar Case (Caso Debanhi Escobar).

== Background ==
Escobar in May 2021

Debanhi Susana Escobar Bazaldúa (b. 4 September 2003, d. ca. 9 – 22 April 2022) was a law student, the adoptive daughter of Mario Escobar and Dolores Bazaldúa, and was 18 years old at the time of her death. Her disappearance and death occurred in a critical context of increasing forced disappearances of women in Mexico. Most of the missing women are girls and adolescents between 10 and 19 years old. In 50 years, 1,790 women have been reported missing, 90% of whom were reported after 2010, while in 2022, there were 52 female victims of this crime in Nuevo León, according to official reports.

== Events ==
On 8 April 2022, Escobar went with two friends to a party at the Quinta Diamante estate in General Escobedo. As the night went on, Escobar's behavior became uncharacteristically erratic, and she got involved in an altercation and locked herself in the men's bathroom. After 1:20 AM the following day, her friends called a DiDi driver to take her home. The driver picked her up, and the two were later seen by security footage arguing in the car. According to a subsequent explanation by the driver, he was trying to ascertain Escobar's home address or a guardian's phone number. However, Escobar was angry, refusing to provide either of these details, as he had groped her. At 4:25 on kilometer 15.5 of the Vía Numancia and Vía a Nuevo Laredo highway in the Nueva Castilla neighborhood, Escobar left the vehicle. The driver exchanged messages with Escobar's friend to discuss the situation, accompanied by a photograph of Escobar standing alone on the desolated highway. This would be the last photograph of Escobar. After several minutes of waiting, the driver left. Security footage indicates that at 4:30, she sought help at Alcosa transportation offices, but no one answered. Later, security cameras record her walking towards the Nueva Castilla Motel.

Escobar's father, Mario, reported his daughter's disappearance to the Nuevo León State Attorney General's Office. The missing person report for Escobar began to be shared on social networks and in the media, accompanied by the photograph her driver captured of her on the highway.

Thirteen days later, on April 22, Escobar's decomposing body was found in the water of the Nueva Castilla Motel's cistern.

== Investigation ==
The search for Escobar – done by a special operation after the media coverage of the disappearance by the Nuevo León State Attorney General's Office (FGJENL) – located five adolescents who were still missing. Once the body was located, a government autopsy concluded that she had fallen in, hit her head, and drowned. However, Escobar's father distrusted this version of events and had a second autopsy conducted. This second autopsy revealed sexual and physical abuse had occurred before Escobar's death. The cause of her death was ruled to be "deep cranial contusion."

Several aspects of Escobar's case remain unexplained. The cause of Escobar's erratic behavior on the night of her disappearance is unclear, with possibilities including alcohol intoxication and voluntary or involuntary intake of drugs. No perpetrator of the homicide has been identified, and it is unknown whether the conclusion of the initial autopsy, if incorrect, was incorrect due to incompetence or corruption.

== Social impact ==
Escobar's case galvanized Mexican society. Protests around the country started when the news of the disappearance emerged, and they continued after Escobar's body was found. Hundreds of women marched through Mexico City and several cities in other states. The demonstrators, mainly women, carried signs reading "No to harassment" and "Mexico is a mass grave." Protesters chanted for justice while holding banners that said: "More than 24,000 women are missing." In Mexico, the number of missing people has risen to over 100,000.

Leticia Hidalgo, founder of FUNDENL, a non-governmental organization, stated, "This is a humanitarian tragedy. I want people to know that Debanhi's case is just the tip of the iceberg of what is happening here in Nuevo León".
