= Cecil Hotel (Los Angeles) =

Affordable housing complex in Downtown Los Angeles

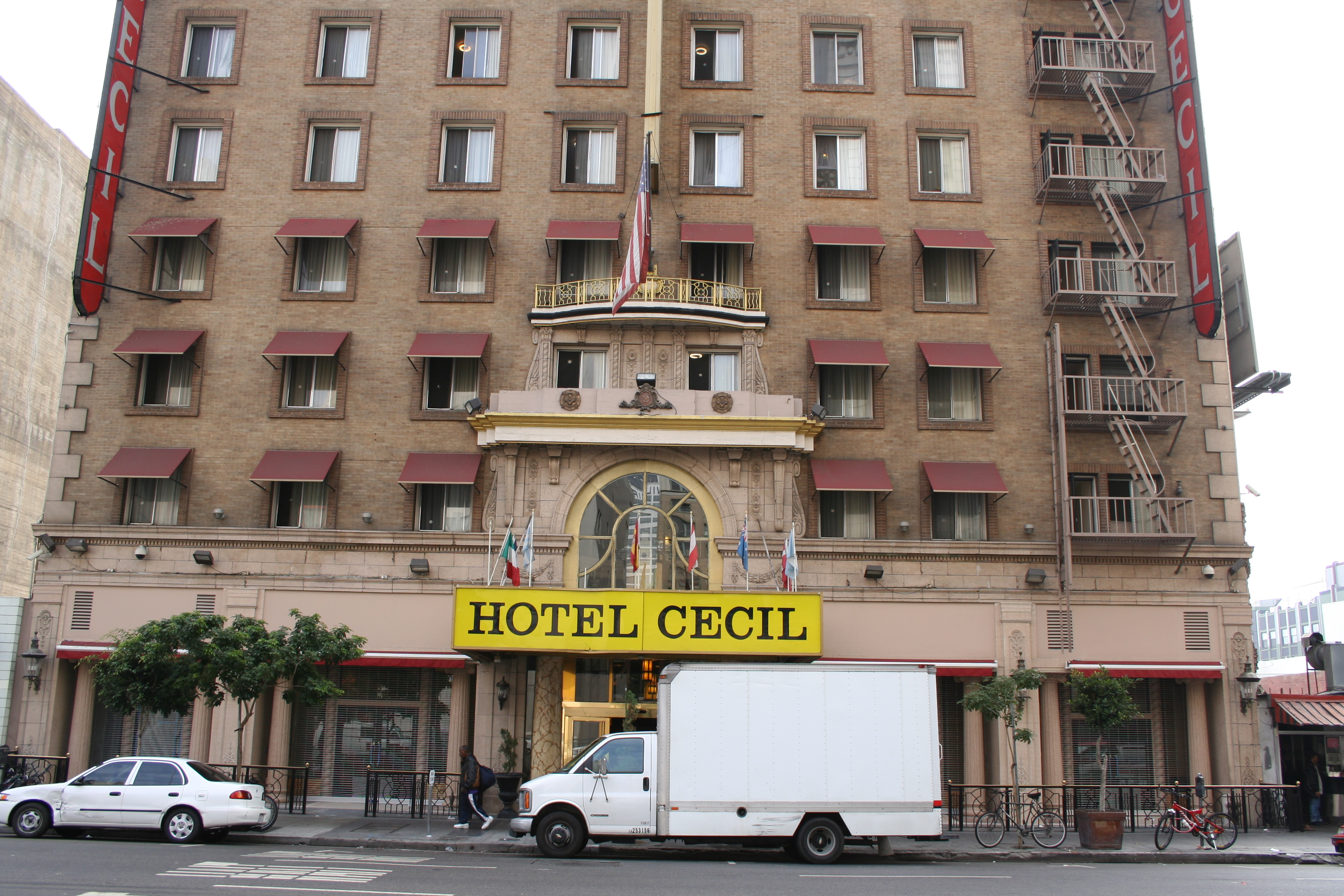
- Cecil Hotel in 2005

- Location within the Los Angeles metropolitan area

General information
- Location: 640 S Main St, Los Angeles, CA 90014, United States
- Coordinates: 34°2′39.04″N 118°15′1.97″W
- Opening: 1924
- Owner: Richard Born
- Operator: Skid Row Housing Trust

Technical details
- Floor count: 14 above ground; 1 basement level; 1 mezzanine
- Lifts/elevators: 2 (installed by the Otis Elevator Company)

Design and construction
- Architect: Loy Lester Smith
- Developer: Simon Barron Developments

Other information
- Number of rooms: 700
- Number of suites: 301

Website
- Archived official website at the Wayback Machine (archived February 24, 2013)

History
- Built: 1924

Site notes
- Governing body: Private

Los Angeles Historic-Cultural Monument
- Designated: 2016
- Reference no.: 1140

The Cecil Hotel is an affordable housing complex in Downtown Los Angeles. It opened on December 20, 1924, as a hotel, but declined during the Great Depression and subsequent decades. In 2011, the hotel was renamed the Stay On Main. The 14-floor hotel has 700 guest rooms and a checkered history, with many suicides and accidental or unnatural deaths occurring there. Renovations started in 2017 were halted by the COVID-19 pandemic, resulting in the hotel's temporary closure. On December 13, 2021, the Cecil Hotel was reinaugurated as an affordable housing complex.

A 2023 Los Angeles Times article described and photographed the run-down conditions inside the Cecil Hotel, which included black mold and vermin infestations, water leakages, graffiti, vandalism, and unsanitary communal amenities. Many of its low-income residents, including former Skid Row homeless persons, require ongoing medical, mental health and substance abuse treatment.

In 2024, the owners of the Hotel Cecil, Simon Baron Properties, listed the property for sale.

== History ==
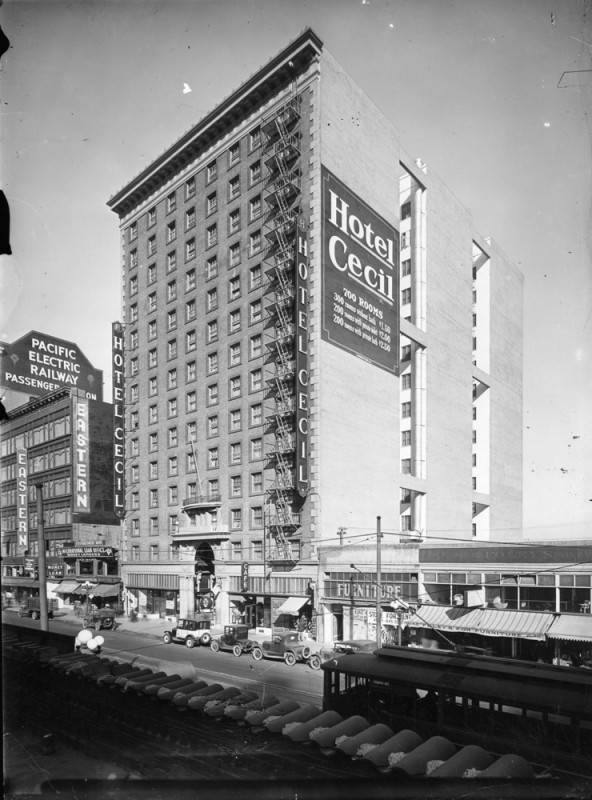
The Cecil Hotel, c. 1925

The Cecil was built in 1924 by three hoteliers—William Banks Hanner, Charles L. Dix and Robert H. Schops—as a destination for business travelers and tourists. Designed by Loy Lester Smith in the Beaux Arts (or Art déco) style and constructed by W. W. Paden; the hotel cost $1.5 million to complete and boasted an opulent marble lobby with stained-glass windows, potted palms, and alabaster statuary. The three hoteliers invested about $2.5 million in the enterprise, with the knowledge that several similar hotels had been established elsewhere downtown, but within five years of its opening, the United States sank into the Great Depression. Although the hotel flourished as a fashionable destination throughout the 1940s, the decades beyond saw the hotel decline, as the nearby area known as Skid Row became increasingly populated with transients. As many as 10,000 homeless people lived within a four-mile (6 km) radius.

In 1987, the Cecil Hotel featured prominently in the recordings of U2's music video "Where The Streets Have No Name", with many of the building's historical features visible.

In 2008, a portion of the hotel was refurbished after new owners took over from there.

In 2011, part of the Cecil Hotel was rebranded as "Stay on Main", with separate reception areas during the day, but with shared facilities and its official website remained thececilhotel.com.

In 2014, the hotel was sold to New York City hotelier Richard Born for $30 million, after which another New York-based firm, Simon Baron Development, acquired a 99-year ground lease on the property. In 2016, Matt Baron, president of Simon Baron, said he was committed to the preservation of architecturally or historically significant components of the building, such as the hotel's grand lobby, but his company planned to completely redevelop the interior and fix the "hodgepodge" work that had been done in more recent years. The hotel closed in 2017 for the renovation, but the work was suspended indefinitely when the COVID-19 pandemic hit.

In February 2017, the Los Angeles City Council voted to deem the Cecil a Historic-Cultural Monument, because it is representative of an early 20th-century American hotel and because of the historic significance of its architect's body of work.

On December 13, 2021, the Cecil Hotel reopened as an affordable housing complex operated by the Skid Row Housing Trust. The facility will provide affordable living accommodations for 600 low-income residents.

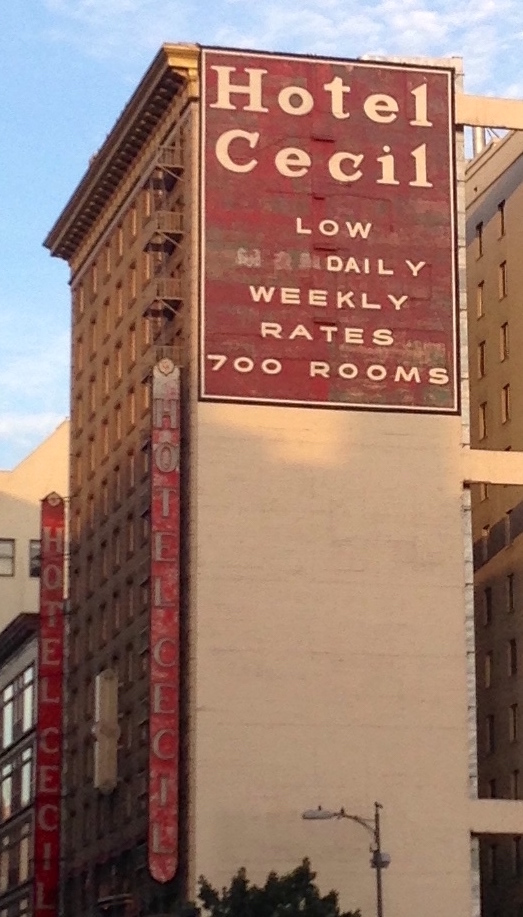
Exterior | Historic Room Rate Sign

In April 2022, the historic Cecil Hotel room rate advertisement painted on its southern façade was illegally white-washed. Although it is unclear whether the owners, the lessees, or the sub-lessees were responsible for the removal of the protected landmark's signage, it was likely removed to make way for a new mural or billboard. It was reported that artist Matthew Garcia was commissioned to paint a mural on the building. Additionally, an artist's rendering of billboards designed by Found Design for Simon Baron Development and organized by media developer Kevani, in which the project is entitled "The Frames," has been in circulation. Kevani's website indicates that the billboards are "coming soon." The original advertisement had been on the building since at least 1927. It originally read "HOTEL CECIL LOW MONTHLY WEEKLY RATES 700 ROOMS" with monthly later changed to daily. The remains of the first letters can still be seen and this is why the current word "daily" is aligned on the right side unlike the other rows.

== Reputation for violence, suicide, and murder ==
In 1931 a guest, W. K. Norton, died in his room after taking poison capsules. Throughout the 1940s and 1950s, more suicides at the Cecil occurred. In 2008, two long-time residents referred to the Cecil as "The Suicide", and it became a popular nickname in social media years later.

Cecil became a notorious rendezvous spot for adulterous couples, drug activity, and a common ground for prostitutes.

In 1964, a retired telephone operator named "Pigeon Goldie" Osgood who had been a well-known and well-liked long-term resident at the hotel was found dead in her room. She had been raped, stabbed, beaten and her room ransacked. Jacques B. Ehlinger was charged with Osgood's murder because he was seen covered in blood roaming the streets close to the hotel, but was later cleared as a suspect. Her murder remains unsolved.

In the 1980s, the hotel was the temporary residence of serial killer Richard Ramirez, nicknamed the "Night Stalker". Ramirez was a regular presence in the Skid Row area. According to a hotel clerk who had known him, Ramirez stayed at the Cecil for a few weeks. According to KPCC, he reportedly committed fourteen murders while resident there. In 1989, Ramirez was convicted of 13 murders and sentenced to death, although he would ultimately die of cancer in 2013. Another serial killer, Austrian Jack Unterweger, stayed at the Cecil in 1991, possibly because he sought to copy Ramirez's crimes. While there, he strangled and killed at least three prostitutes, crimes he was convicted of in Austria.

In 2013, the Cecil (by then re-branded as the "Stay on Main" although still maintaining the original Hotel Cecil signs and painted advertisements on its exterior) became the focus of renewed attention when surveillance footage of a young Canadian student, Elisa Lam, behaving erratically in the hotel's elevator, was disseminated widely in international media. The video depicts Lam repeatedly pressing the elevator's buttons, walking in and out of the elevator and possibly attempting to hide from someone. It was recorded shortly before her disappearance. After 19 days, her naked body was discovered in a water supply cistern on the hotel roof, following complaints from guests of odd-tasting water and low pressure. How she got into the water tank long remained a mystery. The floor Lam stayed on was one of the floors that did not have security footage, which left uncertainty as to whether her death was a homicide. Among her possessions left at the hotel were several prescription medications, seemingly untouched. Lam’s sister revealed to detectives that Lam had a history of not taking her medication (Lam had previously been diagnosed with bipolar disorder). Police ruled that her erratic behavior on the elevator was caused by a paranoid hallucination, as she had climbed into the tank herself, believing that she was in danger. Police then speculate that perhaps when she entered the tank, the water level was high enough that she could have gotten herself out; but as guests and residents used the tap water, the level could have decreased leaving her trapped in the tank, without a way to get herself out. They also speculate she undressed while in the tank, attempting to remove the clothing weighing her down. The Los Angeles County Coroner ruled her death accidental due to drowning, with bipolar disorder being a significant factor.

== See also ==
- List of Los Angeles Historic-Cultural Monuments in Downtown Los Angeles
