= FUNDENL =

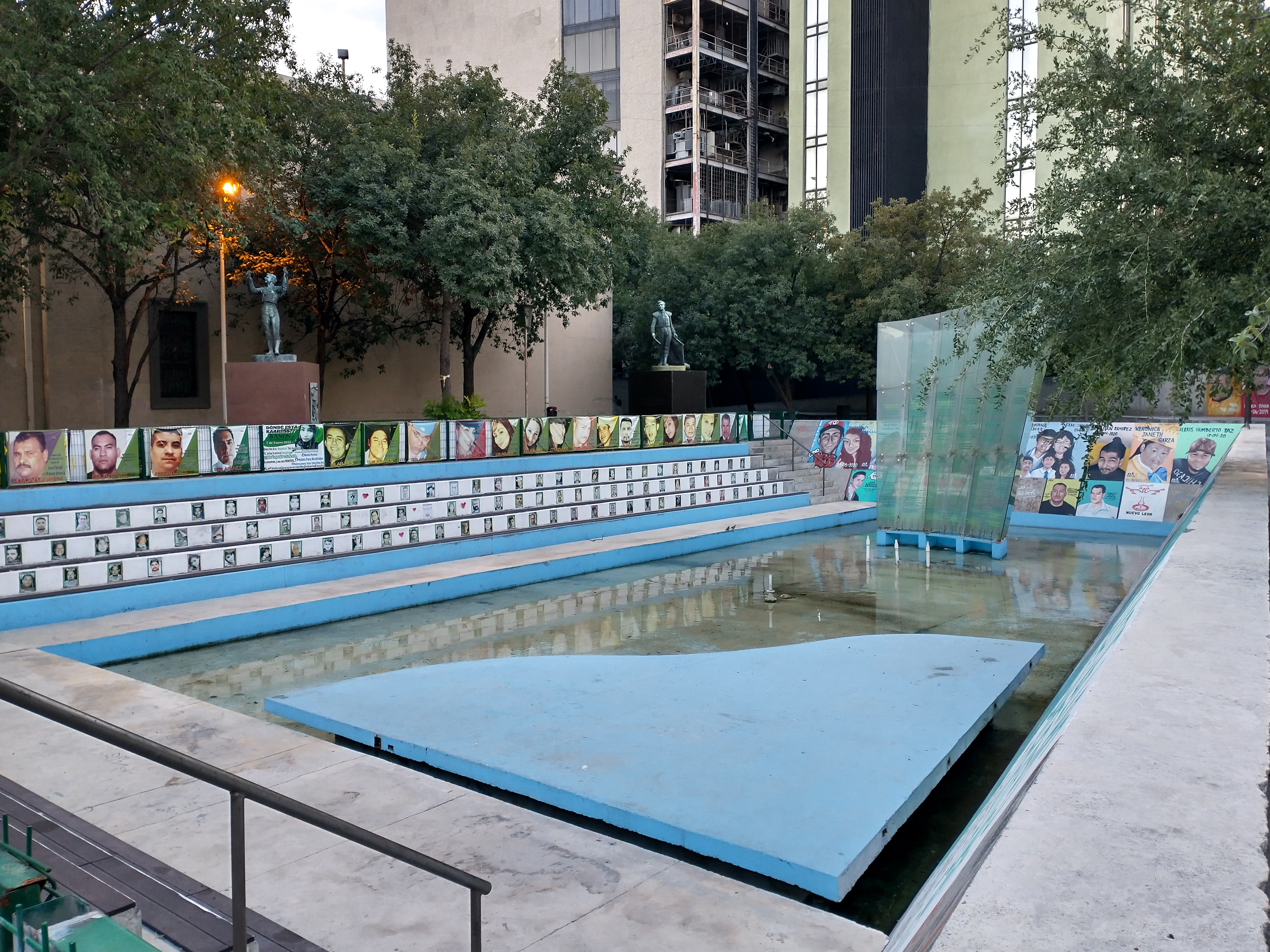
Place known as "Plaza de los desaparecidos" in Monterrey, Nuevo León.

Fuerzas Unidas por Nuestros Desaparecidos en Nuevo León (FUNDENL) is a non-governmental organisation formally established in 2012 in the state of Nuevo León, Mexico. Its primary purpose is to search for and locate victims of forced disappearance or by individuals, as well as to encourage and support the defence, promotion and respect for human rights. FUNDENL is formed by relatives of missing persons and people who carry out solidarity accompaniment or activists who empathise with the issue.

The organisation began with two mothers of missing persons who exhausted the institutional means to search for their sons; together with solidarity activists, they gathered more families to search for their relatives and loved ones by their own means. Their main slogan is "Because they were taken alive, and we want them alive".

FUNDENL, in addition to carrying out search work; also has a registry of missing persons in Nuevo Leon and other states of the country; participates in national meetings on the subject of missing persons; denounces cases of disappearance in public spaces; publishes papers to disseminate their struggle and communicate the problem nationally and internationally. Among the activities and acts of collective memory that have been carried out is Embroidery for Peace in Nuevo Leon (Bordados por la Paz), among other artistic practices.

Raising awareness about forced disappearance is also part of the NGO's advocacy. This is because people who have been disappeared are stigmatised and criminalised by society. FUNDENL has launched campaigns on social media to make citizens aware that disappearance happens more commonly than people think.

The members of FUNDENL carried out practices of memory by appropriating and redesigning a public space in the city of Monterrey, Nuevo León, which became known as "La Plaza de la Transparencia" (The Plaza of Transparency). In that place there was a monument made of metal and glass where they began to place the names of their disappeared relatives with the intention that upon their return, their own relatives would remove their names from the monument, today this place is known as "The Plaza of the Disappeared" and the monument was transformed into a space for their memory.

Among its international advocacy is the struggle of one of the members and founders, Irma Leticia Hidalgo, mother of Roy Rivera Hidalgo who has been missing since January 11, 2011. She took her case to the UN Human Rights Committee, which recognised that the Mexican State "did not prove that the investigation into the disappearance of Roy Rivera Hidalgo had been carried out with due diligence". Likewise, the Committee considered that Leticia Hidalgo "has sufficiently substantiated her allegations and that the State Prosecutor's Office has not duly refuted that the disappearance is attributable to the State".

== Search for missing people ==
FUDENL created a platform called "Huellas de Vida: Búsqueda de Personas Desaparecidas en Nuevo León" which is a citizen's tool with a humanitarian approach, developed by FUNDENL, the American Jewish World Service and the Centro de Investigación en Ciencias de Información Geoespacial. This platform has the objective of documenting information related to Missing Persons, unidentified located persons and personal objects located in clandestine burial sites in Nuevo Leon, so that this data can be consulted and analysed in a public way and identify patterns or coincidences that can help in the search and location of Missing Persons. FUNDENL mentions that the idea was born after detecting that when a garment or object, which could belong to a missing person, was handed over to the authorities, it was only archived, that is why they created this database that will be complemented with national and international information that will be shared by other collectives.

In addition to this tool that helps to create a database and to relate findings, FUNDENL has been trained in "tools and legal knowledge about the registration of human remains, so that they can assist and request the authorities the correct application of search protocols", these trainings were provided by the Research Group in Social and Forensic Anthropology. On August 30, 2019, an Independent Forensic Group was formalised, made up of Anthropologists and Archaeologists in solidarity with FUNDENL's cause. These professionals have accompanied the organisation since 2014, when they began field search work and independent exhumations. In 2014, FUNDENL, together with the Peruvian Forensic Anthropology Team, achieved the full identification of Brenda Damaris González Solís, who disappeared on July 31, 2011. In 2017, field searches were conducted in the municipality of García, Nuevo León where thousands of human remains were found. In addition, during 2018 the Forensic Group through FUNDENL trained the Attorney General's Office in archaeological techniques applied in the field, the use of drone and photogrammetry.
