= List of solved missing person cases (1950–1969) =

This is a list of solved missing person cases of people who went missing in unknown locations or unknown circumstances that were eventually explained by their reappearance or the recovery of their bodies, the conviction of the perpetrator(s) responsible for their disappearances, or a confession to their killings. There are separate lists covering disappearances before 1950, List of solved missing person cases (1970s), List of solved missing person cases (1980s), List of solved missing person cases (1990s) and then since 2000.

== 1950s ==
Date	Person(s)	Age	Country of disappearance	Circumstances	Outcome	Time spent missing or unconfirmed
February 16th, 1950	J. K. Rideout	37–38	British Hong Kong	J. K. Rideout, a British linguist and professor of Oriental Studies at both the University of Sydney and the University of Hong Kong, disappeared on 16 February 1950. His body was found 12 days later upon the shores of Lantau Island. Although suspicion pertaining to a mooted connection to British Intelligence surrounds his death, authorities ruled Rideout's death to be accidental.	Accidental death	12 days
July 22nd, 1950	Robert Robertson	41	United States	Robert Robertson was found dead on July 22, 1950 at 2138 Davenport Avenue in Cleveland, Ohio. Police believed that he had been deceased for six to eight weeks and had been decapitated.	Murdered	6 to 8 weeks
July 6th, 1950	Ernest C. Fiebelkorn	27	South Korea	Fiebelkorn, a USAAF fighter ace who shot down nine aircraft during World War II and also fought in the Korean War, was listed as missing in action together with his radar operator Captain John J. Higgins on July 6, 1950, when they both failed to return to base while flying as part of a four-ship element sent to locate and strafe advancing enemy ground forces through heavy low overcast at the Suwon-Seoul area. The remains of both men were found in 1953 by UN troops on a mountainside approximately 40 miles (64 km) north of Seoul.	Killed in action	3 years
February 21st, 1951	Luis Albino	6	United States	Luis Albino, an American child who was kidnapped in Oakland, California on February 21, 1951 and was discovered to be alive living with a family in 2024.	Found alive	73 years
August 26th, 1951	Bill Barilko	24	Canada	Bill Barilko, a player for the Toronto Maple Leafs hockey team, disappeared in August 1951 while returning from a fishing trip at Seal River, Ontario. He was with his dentist, Henry Hudson, flying aboard Hudson's Fairchild 24 floatplane at the time of their disappearance. Barilko and Hudson remained missing for 11 years until the plane's wreckage was found 56 miles (90 km) off course north of Cochrane, Ontario, partially burned and submerged in a swamp with the men's bodies found still strapped in their seats.	Died (plane crash	11 years
August 26th, 1951	Henry Hudson	Unknown	Canada		Died (plane crash	11 years
April 19th, 1951	Philip Mangano	53	United States of America	A mafia underboss of Mangano crime family (the future Gambino crime family), Philip Mangano disappeared on April 19, 1951. His body was found the same day. Also that same day, his brother Vincent Mangano disappeared; his body was never found. Both are believed to have been murdered on the orders of family underboss Albert Anastasia in Brooklyn in 1951 as part of a coup.	Murdered	Less than a day
July 15th, 1951	Brenda Goddard	5	United Kingdom	The first of three victims murdered by child killer John Straffen. Brenda was lured to a meadow and strangled to death on the afternoon of July 15, 1951; her body was discovered approximately four hours after her foster mother reported her missing.	Murdered	4 hours
1951	Renata Balleyova	Unknown	Czechoslovakia	On July 20, 1951, children playing in the sand near the village of Senec uncovered a human leg, leading to the discovery of the decaying remains of Renata Balleyova, a photographer from Plzeň who had intended to defect from Czechoslovakia. This in turn led to the arrest of Hubert Pilčík, a human smuggler who also killed Balleyova's father, Emanuel, and kidnapped and repeatedly raped Emanual's 12-year-old niece while forcing her to write letters addressed from Bavaria, demanding payment for the letters in jewelry. Both Balleyova and her father were killed with baton blows to the head. Pilčík killed himself in prison on September 9, 1951.	Murdered	Unknown
February 10th, 1952	George Andrew Davis Jr.	31	North Korea	Davis was a highly decorated fighter pilot and flying ace of the USAAF during World War II and later of the USAF during the Korean War. During his final combat mission in northwest Korea on February 10, 1952, Davis surprised and attacked twelve Chinese MiG-15 fighter jets about to attack friendly aircraft in "MiG Alley", downing two of the MiG-15s before he was shot down and killed. He was not seen bailing out and was declared missing in action and presumed killed. The Chinese military later recovered his body from the crashed aircraft, although they never returned it to the United States. Controversies arose surrounding the circumstances of his death, and he was posthumously awarded the Medal of Honor for his actions that day.	Killed in action	1 week
7 0ctober 1952	Betty Alexander	4	Scotland	Scottish female child Betty Alexander was kidnapped and murdered in Glasgow and was found dead three days later.	Murdered	3 days
1953	Marcos Rodríguez Pantoja	7	Spain	A Spanish feral child. Pantoja (b. 1946) was sold to a goat herder at the age of seven; he later lived alone with the wolves in the Sierra Morena following the goat herder's death, but was discovered in 1965 at the age of nineteen and returned to civilization.	Rescued	12 years
April 9th, 1953	Wilma Montesi	21	Italy	21-year-old Wilma Montesi was last seen alive on 9 April 1953; her body was discovered on the shore of Torvaianica two days later. Montesi was found partially dressed; her handbag and several of her clothes were missing. Ugo Montagna and Piero Piccioni, son of deputy prime minister Attilio Piccioni, were alleged to have been involved, causing a scandal, though both were absolved of all charges. Montesi's murder remains unsolved, and the cause of death remains unknown.	Murdered	2 days
May 17th, 1953	Kyllikki Saari	17	Finland	Kyllikki Saari, a girl from Finland, was last seen alive on May 17, 1953, cycling home from a prayer meeting. Kyllikki's bicycle was recovered in a marsh that summer and her remains were found on October 11, 1953, in a bog.	Murdered	5 months
May 31, 1953	Christine Reed	18	United Kingdom	Victims of the "Towpath Killer" Alfred Whiteway. Reed and Songhurst were teenage friends last seen cycling along a towpath close to the River Thames on 31 May 1953. Songhurst's body was found in the river the following day; Reed's body was discovered on 6 June. Both had been bludgeoned and raped. Whiteway was hanged for their murders on December 22, 1953.	Murdered	6 days
May 31, 1953	Barbara Songhurst	16	United Kingdom	Victims of the "Towpath Killer" Alfred Whiteway. Reed and Songhurst were teenage friends last seen cycling along a towpath close to the River Thames on 31 May 1953. Songhurst's body was found in the river the following day; Reed's body was discovered on 6 June. Both had been bludgeoned and raped. Whiteway was hanged for their murders on December 22, 1953.	Murdered	1 day
June 20th, 1953	Stella Darlene Nolan	8	United States	Stella Darlene Nolan was an American female child who went missing in Norwalk, California, on June 20, 1953 after she disappeared from a flea market. Her killer Mack Ray Edwards showed the police where the remains were in early 1970. They were in the city of Downey, buried eight feet under an embankment, that was close to a Santa Ana Freeway abutment.	Murdered	23 years
August 10th, 1953	Art Gilkey	26	Pakistan	Gilkey disappeared while climbing K2 mountain in 1953. He had developed thrombophlebitis (blood clots in his leg), followed by a pulmonary embolism, and his fellow climbers, including Charlie Houston and Pete Schoening, wrapped him in a sleeping bag to bring him down the mountain. However, while resting at camp, Gilkey was swept away by an avalanche and disappeared. His body was found at the base of the south side of K2 in 1993.	Died (Unknown cause)	40 years
June 12th, 1953	Eugene Lindsey	45	United States of America	Father and son Eugene and Richard Lindsey, and their friend Frederick Claar, were last seen on June 12, 1953, in the Gaspé region of Quebec, where they had driven to from Hollidaysburg, Pennsylvania, on a hunting trip. Eugene Lindsey's body was discovered in deep bush a month later (July 15) and those of the other two men on July 23, some 4 kilometres away. Their clothing bore bullet holes. The discoveries led to the arrest of a prospector named Wilbert Coffin and his conviction based on circumstantial evidence. He was eventually hanged. The case is well known in Canada as the Coffin affair.	Murdered	33 days
June 12th, 1953	Richard Lindsey	17	United States of America		Murdered	41 days
June 12th, 1953	Frederick Claar	20	United States of America		Murdered	41 days
1954	Marina Chapman	4	Columbia	Marina Chapman, a Colombian female child who was abducted in 1954 days before her birthday, from her home and years later was found living in the jungle after being raised by monkeys.	Found alive	5–6 years
March 26th, 1954	Henri Le Masne	30	Italy	Henri La Masne was a French man who went missing, while he was skiing in the Italian Alps on March 26, 1954, and his body was discovered in Valtournenche, Cime Bianche in 2005 and identified in 2017.	Died (hypothermia)	60 years
1954	Dorothy Gay Howard	18	United States of America	Howard's body was discovered at the foot of a steep embankment on April 8, 1954. She had been beaten prior to her death. Her body was identified in 2009.	Murdered	55 years
June 22nd, 1954	Honorah Rieper	45	New Zealand	Rieper was murdered by her 16-year-old daughter, Pauline Parker, and her daughter's friend, 15-year-old Juliet Hulme, in Christchurch, New Zealand. The murder had been planned by the schoolgirls as she was viewed as an individual who would refuse to allow her daughter to move to South Africa with her friend. Her body was found the same day.	Murdered	Less than 1 day
December 8th, 1954	Mary Hogan	51	United States of America	The first-known murder victim of Ed Gein. Hogan was a tavern proprietress whom Gein confessed to murdering on December 8, 1954. Gein transported her body to his farm, where he mutilated her corpse but retained her skull and preserved face. These were discovered following his 1957 arrest.	Murdered	3 years
April 28th, 1955	Stephanie Bryan	14	United States	Abducted and murdered by Burton Abbott on April 28, 1955; her body was discovered in a shallow grave in Trinity County on July 20. Abbott was executed for her murder in March 1957.	Murdered	3 months
May 20th, 1955	Herman Schultheis	55	Guatemala	Herman Schultheis was a technician and photographer who worked for Walt Disney Studios who disappeared on May 20, 1955, near Tikal, Guatemala. His remains were found on November 23, 1956, as well as some of his belongings.	Died (unknown cause)	18 months
June 15th, 1955	Curtis Chillingworth	58	United States of America	Curtis Chillingworth was a Florida attorney and state judge who disappeared from his Manalapan, Florida on June 15, 1955. He was later discovered to have been murdered though his body was never recovered.	Murdered	Never found
September 4th, 1955	James Larratt Battersby	48	United Kingdom	An English fascist and pacifist; Battersby disappeared from his lodgings in Southport, Lancashire, on September 4, 1955; he committed suicide jumping into the paddles of the Mersey Ferry. His body was discovered on 29 September.	Died (suicide)	25 days
July 4th, 1956	Peter Weinberger	1 month	United States of America	Peter Weinberger was a male toddler in Nassau County, New York, who, on July 4, 1956, was abducted and held for ransom. His kidnapper, Angelo LaMarca, was arrested over a month later. On August 24, LaMarca directed authorities to a location near a highway where he claimed he had abandoned Weinberger alive. By the time of LaMarca's arrest, Weinberger had died of asphyxiation, with starvation and exposure as contributing factors; a medical examiner posited he could have lived up to a week before perishing.	Murdered	5 weeks
August 6th, 1956	Donald Lee Baker	13	United States of America	American children Donald Lee Baker and Brenda Jo Howell rode their bicycles to the San Gabriel Canyon area near Glendora Mountain Road and disappeared on August 6, 1956. A few days later, Donald's jacket and Brenda's bicycle were found near Morris Dam, a quarter of a mile south of where they were last seen. Donald's bicycle was located a month later. Serial killer Mack Ray Edwards would later confess to their murders but their bodies have never been found.	Murdered	Never found
August 6th, 1956	Brenda Jo Howell	11	United States of America	American children Donald Lee Baker and Brenda Jo Howell rode their bicycles to the San Gabriel Canyon area near Glendora Mountain Road and disappeared on August 6, 1956. A few days later, Donald's jacket and Brenda's bicycle were found near Morris Dam, a quarter of a mile south of where they were last seen. Donald's bicycle was located a month later. Serial killer Mack Ray Edwards would later confess to their murders but their bodies have never been found.	Murdered	Never found
December 16th, 1956	Donald B. Anderson	52	United States of America	Anderson was a justice of the Idaho Supreme Court. His body was found in his vehicle alongside U.S. Highway 30. His death was ruled a suicide.	Died (suicide)	1 day
December 28th, 1956	Barbara Grimes	15	United States of America	Barbara and Patricia Grimes were sisters who disappeared from the Brighton Park, Chicago, Illinois area on December 28, 1956, while returning home from a movie. Their bodies were found on January 22, 1957, down an embankment off a roadway.	Murdered	25 days
December 28th, 1956	Patricia Grimes	12	United States of America	Barbara and Patricia Grimes were sisters who disappeared from the Brighton Park, Chicago, Illinois area on December 28, 1956, while returning home from a movie. Their bodies were found on January 22, 1957, down an embankment off a roadway.	Murdered	25 days
January 23rd, 1957	Willie Edwards	24	United States of America	Willie Edwards was a black American man who on January 23, 1957, was killed by unknown members of the Alabama Ku Klux Klan. His body was thrown into the Alabama River, Montgomery County, Alabama and was found three months later. His murder remains unsolved.	Murdered	3 months
1957	Joseph Augustus Zarelli	4	United States of America	The naked, extensively beaten body of 4-year-old Joseph August Zarelli was discovered in Philadelphia, Pennsylvania on February 25, 1957. Authorities believe the cause of death to be blunt force trauma. Zarelli remained unidentified for over 65 years and was known only as "the Boy in the Box." On November 30, 2022, the Philadelphia Police Department announced that Zarelli's identity had been determined via DNA and genealogical databases. Zarelli was publicly identified on December 8, 2022.	Murdered	65 years
February 25th, 1957	Mary Jane Barker	4	United States of America	Mary Jane Barker, a girl from Bellmawr, New Jersey, went missing on February 25, 1957, along with her playmate's dog. Barker was found dead in the closet of a vacant house near her home on March 3, 1957, after becoming trapped with the dog, who survived (but was euthanized for examination in an attempt to better understand the circumstances).	Died (starvation)	6 days
March 15th, 1957	Lawrence Joseph Bader	30	United States of America	Lawrence Joseph Bader was a cookware salesman from Akron, Ohio who disappeared on a fishing trip on March 15, 1957, in Lake Erie. Eight years later he was found alive in Omaha, Nebraska working as a local TV personality named "Fritz" Johnson. He died from a brain tumor a year later, leaving six children from two wives. It has been debated, but never determined, whether he was an amnesiac, had multiple personalities, or was simply a hoaxer.	Found alive	8 years
November 16th, 1957	Bernice Worden	58	United States of America	Hardware store owner Bernice Worden disappeared on November 16, 1957, and was later found dead at the home of killer Ed Gein.	Murdered	1 day
December 3rd, 1957	Maria Ridulph	7	United States of America	Maria Ridulph was an American girl who disappeared on December 3, 1957, from a street corner in her neighborhood in Sycamore, Illinois. Her body was found in Woodbine, 100 miles from her home, on April 26, 1958.	Murdered	4 months, 3 weeks
December 30th, 1957	Anne Noblett	17	United Kingdom	Watford Technical College student who disappeared while travelling to her home in Marshalls Heath on December 30, 1957. Her fully clothed body was found in a wooded area near Whitwell on January 31, 1958. It was determined that she had been killed, but to this day, nobody has been arrested in her murder.	Murdered	1 month
1958	Ishinosuke Uwano	35 to 36	Soviet Union	Ishinosuke Uwano was a former soldier in the Japanese Imperial Army who disappeared in 1958 and was found living in Ukraine in April 2006.	Found alive	48 years
June 6th, 1958	Harry Baker	61	United Kingdom	British credit draper who disappeared on June 6, 1958, while visiting customers in Bootle. More than two weeks later, Baker's body was found wrapped up in two sacks, showing signs that he had been beaten and strangled.	Murdered	17 days
November, 1958	Olga Duncan	30	United States of America	Olga Duncan disappeared in a murder planned by her mother-in-law Elizabeth Ann Duncan.	Murdered	1 month
April 24th, 1959	Mack Charles Parker	22	United States of America	Mack Charles Parker was an American black man who was accused of raping a pregnant white woman. On April 24, 1959, two days before he was to stand trial, a white group broke into his jail cell and abducted him, then took him out to the Pearl River Bridge on the Mississippi-Louisiana border and shot him, throwing him into the river. His body was recovered from the river on May 4, 1959.	Murdered	10 days
June 9th, 1959	Cheryl Lynne Harper	12	Canada	A Canadian schoolgirl who disappeared on June 9, 1959. Harper's raped and strangled body was discovered two days later. Fourteen-year-old Steven Truscott was arrested and convicted of Harper's murder; he was released from custody in 1969 and his conviction overturned in 2007.	Murdered	2 days
July 26th, 1959	Dennis R. Bell	25	King George Island	Bell was a meteorologist who accidentally fell and died in a crevasse at King George Island in 1959. His remains were not recovered until 2025.	Accidental death	66 years
September 7th,1959	Bob Doll	40	United States of America	Bob Doll was an American professional basketball player who disappeared from Rabbit Ears Pass, Colorado in early September 1959 and was found dead on September 18, 1959.	Died (suicide)	11 days

== 1960s ==
=== 1960 ===
Date	Person(s)	Age	Country of disappearance	Circumstances	Outcome	Time spent missing or unconfirmed
1960s	António Alva Rosa Coutinho	30s	Portuguese Angola	Portuguese naval officer who was kidnapped by FNLA guerillas while patrolling the Zaire River in Angola. He was eventually released, and went on to participate in the Carnation Revolution.	Found alive	Several months
1960	Tang Choon Keng	59	State of Singapore	Tang was a Singaporean entrepreneur who founded the Tangs department store and later the Orchard Road, two of the country's principal retail stores. He was abducted by four armed gunmen in 1960, but released without incident three days later after the ransom demanded was paid.	Found alive	3 days
April 16th, 1960	Irene Garza	26	United States of America	Garza was a schoolteacher and beauty queen who went missing on April 16, 1960, while going to confession at a church in McAllen, Texas. Her body, bearing signs of sexual assault and suffocation, was found in a canal five days later. John Feit, the priest who heard her confession, was the prime suspect in her death for decades, until he was arrested and convicted in her murder in 2017, receiving a life sentence.	Murdered	5 days
July 7th, 1960	Graeme Thorne	8	Australia	Thorne was an Australian schoolboy who was kidnapped on July 7, 1960, in Sydney, Australia, by a man who wished to extort his parents who had recently won the lottery. His body was found on August 16. A Hungarian immigrant was later convicted of the killing.	Murdered	1 month
July 21st, 1960	Sharon Lee Gallegos	4	United States of America	Abducted by unknown individuals from her home in Alamogordo, New Mexico, with her body found in Congress, Arizona, Gallegos could not be identified at the time, and was known as "Little Miss Nobody" until her identification in 2022. Her abductors have never been apprehended.	Murdered	62 years
1960	Yossele Schumacher	6	Israel	Abducted by his own grandparents in order that he be raised as a Haredi Orthodox Jew as opposed to his parents' intention to raise the child as a secular Jew. The FBI eventually located Schumacher in the United States and returned the then-eight-year-old child to Israel to live with his parents in September 1962.	Rescued	2 years

=== 1961 ===
Date	Person(s)	Age	Country of disappearance	Circumstances	Outcome	Time spent missing or unconfirmed
January 16, 1961	Linda Smith	12	England	Linda Smith was and English child who was last seen in the main street of her village (Earls Colne in Essex) on 16 January 1961. Her dead body was found by a retired farmworker in the sand and had Smith been strangle her own school scarf. No one has ever been charged with her murder.	Murdered	4 days
April, 1961	Jacques Stephen Alexis	38	Haiti	Alexis was a Haitian communist novelist, poet, and activist who was captured by a Tonton Macoute paramilitary force in April 1961 shortly after arriving at Môle-Saint-Nicolas. He was last seen alive being placed onto a boat at Port-au-Prince, and is believed to have died on or about April 22 that year, as his death was later confirmed.	Murdered	two weeks
August 18th, 1961	Jacqueline Thomas	15	United Kingdom	Thomas was a biscuit factory worker who disappeared from her native Birmingham on August 18, 1961, only to be found raped and strangled a week later. Anthony Hall, who would later be convicted and sentenced to life imprisonment for a similar murder in 1969, was considered a suspect from the beginning, but authorities were unable to charge him until he was identified via DNA technology in 2007. He never stood trial for Thomas's murder and died behind bars in 2011.	Murdered	1 week
September, 1961	Lucy Ann Johnson	25	Canada	Lucy Ann Johnson disappeared in 1961 from British Columbia, Canada, but was not reported missing by her family until 1965. In 2013, she was found alive in Yukon, Canada, having started a new family after her disappearance.	Found alive	52 years
November 12th, 1961	Terry Jo Duperrault	11	United States	Terry Jo Duperrault, the 11-year-old sole survivor of a mass murder case on the ship Bluebelle on November 12, 1961. Duperrault, who drifted on the ocean for three days, was rescued and testified against the ship's captain, who was the killer behind the murder of her parents and siblings on the ship; the captain committed suicide after receiving news of Duperrault's survival.	Found alive	3 days

=== 1962 ===
Date	Person(s)	Age	Country of disappearance	Circumstances	Outcome	Time spent missing or unconfirmed
April 10th, 1962	Raymond Davis	29	United States of America	29-year-old taxi driver Raymond Davis told his dispatcher he was taking a fare to Oceanside, California. The next day, his body was found near the mayor's house in St. Malo, a gated community in Oceanside.	Murdered	1 day
May 31, 1962	Alexandra Wiwcharuk	23	Canada	Canadian beauty queen and Nursing student Alexandra Wiwcharuk disappeared from Saskatoon, Saskatchewan on May 18 and was found dead after being brutally murdered and buried in a shallow grave beside the South Saskatchewan River in City Park nearly two weeks later on May 31, 1962, after she had gone missing.	Murdered	13 days
July 2nd, 1962	Dorothy Gale Brown	11	United States	Brown disappeared while riding her bicycle to a Torrance, CA, car wash near her home to purchase soda from a vending machine. Her body was discovered near Corona del Mar, Newport Beach, the following afternoon. She had been sexually assaulted, then drowned.	Murdered	1 day
July 7th, 1962	Audrey Backeberg	20	United States	Audrey Backeberg, American woman disappeared from Reedsburg, Wisconsin on July 7, 1962, shortly after filing a complaint against her husband. A teen witness said she traveled with Backeberg to Indianapolis, where she was last seen. In 2025, investigators found her alive in another state and determined she had left voluntarily.	Found Alive	63 years
October 22nd, 1962	Carol Ann Dougherty	9	United States of America	Carol Ann Dougherty was raped and murdered in Bristol, Pennsylvania, United States, on October 22, 1962. Her body was found in St. Mark's Roman Catholic Church, where she had stopped to pray on her way to return library books.	Murdered	3 hours

=== 1963 ===
Date	Person(s)	Age	Country of disappearance	Circumstances	Outcome	Time spent missing or unconfirmed
1962–1963	Steven Crawford	2	United States of America	Toddler with Down syndrome whose body was found in a reservoir in Ashland, Oregon on July 11, 1963. He remained unidentified until October 2021, when his DNA was matched to a living half-brother.	Murdered	58–59 years
March 27th, 1963	Wallace C. Halsey	43	United States of America	On 27 March 1963, Wallace C. Halsey, founder of Christ Brotherhood (a UFO religious group) and his business associate Harry Cleveland Ross Jr. (a former mayor of Seal Beach, California) were flying a small Piper Tri-pacer aircraft from Utah to Nevada. Ross, the pilot, was the operator of the Meadowlark Airport in Huntington Beach, California, and a veteran aviator with an airline transport rating. The plane was lost and remained so for 13 years despite an extensive air search and attempts by Halsey's UFO coreligionists to locate him using the aid of extraterrestrial beings who indicated the key to the mystery involved the Egyptian pyramids and the number 14. For example, one seeker claimed extraterrestrials informed him the "pyramids and the number 14 will solve the Halsey mystery." At the time, Halsey was facing federal charges and it was speculated by some that he had fled the country. The wreckage was discovered by a lost deer hunter in rugged mountainous country on 30 October 1976 approximately 30 air miles north of St. George, Utah, some 10–15 miles off the filed flight course. The bodies and wallets of both men were found inside the fuselage, which was crumpled, but unburned.	Died (Plane crash)	13 years
March 27th, 1963	Harry Cleveland Ross Jr.	48	United States of America		Died (Plane crash)	13 years
July 12th, 1963	Pauline Reade	16	United Kingdom	Reade was a teenage girl who was the first victim of the Moors Murderers Ian Brady and Myra Hindley. According to Hindley, Reade was selected because she believed a missing teen would cause less fuss than a younger victim. The two had offered Reade a lift then diverted to Saddleworth Moor where Reade was raped, murdered, and buried.	Murdered	24 years
November 23rd, 1963	John Kilbride	12	United Kingdom	Kilbride was a pre-teen boy who was the second victim of the Moors Murderers Ian Brady and Myra Hindley. Like Reade before him, Kilbride had been lured in with the promise of a lift before being taken to Saddleworth Moor where he was raped, murdered, and buried.	Murdered	2 years

=== 1964 ===
Date	Person(s)	Age	Country of disappearance	Circumstances	Outcome	Time spent missing or unconfirmed
February 13th, 1964	Timo Rinnelt	7	West Germany	Rinnelt was murdered in Wiesbaden by his neighbour Klaus Lehnert. Lehnert faked Rinnelt's kidnapping for over a month before police ceased the investigation. Three years later, Lehnert attempted to renew demands for a ransom by sending Rinnelt's clothes to police, through which Rinnelt's death was confirmed, with a sting operation leading to Lehnert's arrest and discovery of Rinnelt's body.	Murdered	3 years
March 15th, 1964	Mary Theresa Simpson	12	United States of America	A 12-year-old girl from Elmira, New York, who was kidnapped, sexually assaulted and killed on March 15, 1964.	Murdered	4 days
April 27th, 1964	Paul Fronczak	1 day	United States of America	Paul Fronczak was a newborn baby who was kidnapped from the Michael Reese Hospital by a woman who was dressed as a nurse in Chicago, Illinois on April 27, 1964. In 2019, he was discovered as a man named Kevin Ray Baty who was living in Michigan. This became known to the public a year later around the time that he died from cancer.	Found alive	54 years
June 16th, 1964	Keith Bennett	12	United Kingdom	Bennet was a pre-teen boy who was the third victim of the Moors Murderers Ian Brady and Myra Hindley. He, like the past two victims, was lured in by being offered a lift before being taken to Saddleworth Moor where he was raped, murdered, and buried.	Murdered	Never found
December 26th, 1964	Lesley Ann Downey	10	United Kingdom	Downey was a 10-year-old girl who was the fourth victim of the Moors Murderers Ian Brady and Myra Hindley. Unlike the last three, Downey was lured to their van by Brady and Hindley faking needing help with bags, where she was then taken to their home where she was stripped, raped, and murdered, which Brady and Hindley recorded on tape. They buried Downey's body at Saddleworth Moor the next morning.	Murdered	10 months

=== 1965 ===
Date	Person(s)	Age	Country of disappearance	Circumstances	Outcome	Time spent missing or unconfirmed
January 11th, 1965	Marianne Schmidt	15	Australia	The murders of best friends and neighbours Marianne Schmidt and Christine Sharrock occurred at Wanda Beach near Cronulla in Sydney, New South Wales, Australia, on 11 January 1965. The victims' partially buried bodies were discovered the next day. The murders remain New South Wales' oldest unsolved homicides, and are known as the Wanda Beach Murders.	Murdered	1 day
January 11th, 1965	Christine Sharrock	15	Australia	The murders of best friends and neighbours Marianne Schmidt and Christine Sharrock occurred at Wanda Beach near Cronulla in Sydney, New South Wales, Australia, on 11 January 1965. The victims' partially buried bodies were discovered the next day. The murders remain New South Wales' oldest unsolved homicides, and are known as the Wanda Beach Murders.	Murdered	1 day
January 16th, 1965	"Yukon" Eric Holmback	48	United States of America	Eric was a former professional wrestler who committed suicide at age 48 by shooting himself in the mouth in a church parking lot in Cartersville, Georgia, and was reported missing after not showing up for a match. His body was found the following day. Eric is believed to have chosen to die by suicide due to both financial problems and having divorced his wife.	Died (Suicide)	1 day
March, 1965	Robert Ivan Nichols	39	United States of America	Nichols last wrote to his family in March 1965 before severing contact with them, prompting them to file a missing persons report. Nichols worked using his real name until 1976, before stealing the identity of a deceased boy and living under his name until 2002 when "Joseph Newton Chandler III" committed suicide. It was only then that, when authorities tried to contact his next of kin, it was revealed that the Chandler identity was stolen, prompting speculations and investigations for his identity. It would not be until 2018 when Nichols was finally identified.	Died (Suicide)	53 years
July 2nd,1965	Jack Rosenthal	20 months	United States of America	Abandoned as a toddler in 1965, Jack Rosenthal was raised under the identity of a kidnapped child, Paul Fronczak. He discovered his true identity in 2015.	Found alive	50 years
July 14th, 1965	Edmond Crimmins Jr.	5	United States of America	The Crimmins children disappeared from their apartment in Kew Gardens Hills in the Queens borough of New York City on July 14, 1965. Their mother, Alice Crimmins, reported their disappearance to police the same day. Alice "Missy" Crimmins Jr.'s body was discovered the same day; Edmond "Eddie" Jr.'s body was discovered five days later. Both children had been murdered.	Murdered	5 days
July 14th, 1965	Alice Crimmins Jr.	2	United States of America	The Crimmins children disappeared from their apartment in Kew Gardens Hills in the Queens borough of New York City on July 14, 1965. Their mother, Alice Crimmins, reported their disappearance to police the same day. Alice "Missy" Crimmins Jr.'s body was discovered the same day; Edmond "Eddie" Jr.'s body was discovered five days later. Both children had been murdered.	Murdered	Same day
July 24th, 1965	Roscoe Henry Fobair	29	Vietnam	Captain Roscoe Henry Fobair's F-4C Phantom aircraft was shot down by North Vietnamese forces close to Hanoi on 24 July 1965. His remains were recovered in 2001.	Killed in action	36 years
September 8th, 1965	Margaret Reynolds	6	United Kingdom	Reynolds was a young girl and victim of the Cannock Chase murders. Her nude and decomposed body had been laid next to another victim, Diana Tift, in Cannock Chase four months after her disappearance. Murderer Raymond Leslie Morris is suspected to have killed her but he was never convicted	Murdered	4 months
October 6th, 1965	Edward Evans	17	United Kingdom	Evans was a teenage boy who was the fifth and final victim of the Moors Murderers Ian Brady and Myra Hindley. He had been lured to their van by Brady with the promise of sex before being taken to their house for a drink. Brady then decided to involve Hindley's brother-in-law, David Smith, which ultimately led to Smith to witnessing Evans' murder and reporting it to the police the next morning.	Murdered	1 day
December 30th, 1965	Diana Tift	5	United Kingdom	Tift was a young girl and another victim of the Cannock Chase murders. Her body was found next to another victim, Margaret Reynolds, in Cannock Chase. An autopsy showed she was raped before being suffocated. Murderer Raymond Leslie Morris is suspected to have killed her but was never convicted.	Murdered	2 weeks
1965	Ajjamada B. Devaiah	32 or 33	Pakistan	Ajjamada B. Devaiah, an Indian Air Force pilot, was shot down in an aerial dogfight in 1965 over Pakistan. The Indian Air Force was unaware of what happened and declared him missing. It was revealed much later by Pakistan sources, based on a 1979 book by John Fricker, that Devayya's body was found almost intact by villagers not very far from Sargodha and buried. He was decorated posthumously in 1988.	Killed in action	14 years

=== 1966 ===
Date	Person(s)	Age	Country of disappearance	Circumstances	Outcome	Time spent missing or unconfirmed
1966	Hedviga Golik	42	Croatia	Hedviga Golika was a Croatian woman from Zagreb, Croatia, who in 1966 sat down in front of her TV with a cup of tea and died from unknown reasons. Her body was discovered 42 years later when the police entered her apartment.	Died (natural causes)	42 years
February, 1966	Bernadita Gonzalez	44	United States	One of the victims of the unidentified serial killer Miami Strangler. Gonzalez went missing for eight weeks after she was last seen at a salon in February 1966, and her decomposing body was later found in a river. The cause of her death was likely blunt force trauma, but as of today, the murderer was never found.	Murdered	2 months
February 10th, 1966	Garry Heywood	18	Australia	Two co-workers murdered by Raymond Edmunds in Shepparton, Australia, in February 1966. Their bodies were discovered several days later. Edmunds was convicted of their murder in 1986.	Murdered	Less than 1 week
February 10th, 1966	Abina Madill	16	Australia	Two co-workers murdered by Raymond Edmunds in Shepparton, Australia, in February 1966. Their bodies were discovered several days later. Edmunds was convicted of their murder in 1986.	Murdered	Less than 1 week
October 2nd, 1966	Nancy Elaine Leichner	21	United States	Leichner and Nater were women from Florida who disappeared during an outing with a local SCUBA club (then called skin-diving) in the Ocala National Forest. While murderer Gerard John Schaefer admitted to killing them, he was never convicted before his death.	Murdered	Never found
October 2nd, 1966	Pamela Ann Nater	20	United States	Leichner and Nater were women from Florida who disappeared during an outing with a local SCUBA club (then called skin-diving) in the Ocala National Forest. While murderer Gerard John Schaefer admitted to killing them, he was never convicted before his death.	Murdered	Never found

=== 1967 ===
Date	Person(s)	Age	Country of disappearance	Circumstances	Outcome	Time spent missing or unconfirmed
January 6th, 1967	Bernard Oliver	17	United Kingdom	Oliver was a teenage warehouse worker who vanished after spending the evening of January 6, 1967, with some friends in Muswell Hill, but was reported missing after he failed to arrive home. His dismembered remains were found in two suitcases, but despite intensive investigations into his death, nobody was ever charged.	Murdered	10 days
April 16th, 1967	Alvar Larsson	13	Sweden	Alvar Larsson was a Swedish boy who disappeared on April 16, 1967, while going for a walk. In November 1982 a human skull was found on a small island 6 km away that was identified as belonging to Larsson.	Died (undetermined cause)	15 years
July, 1967	Anne McFall	18	United Kingdom	18-year-old Anne McFall disappeared in July 1967, when she was eight months pregnant. McFall's dismembered remains were unearthed at the edge of a cornfield between Much Marcle and Kempley in June 1994. Serial killer Fred West initially denied being responsible for her murder; however, following West's arrest, he confided in a visitor that he had stabbed McFall to death following an argument.	Murdered	27 years
July 9th, 1967	Mary Terese Fleszar	19	United States of America	19-year-old Eastern Michigan University student Mary Terese Fleszar disappeared in Ypsilanti, Michigan on July 9, 1967. Her nude, decomposed body was discovered by two 15-year-old boys on an abandoned farm in Superior Township on August 7, 1967; the body was formally identified as Fleszar's the following day via dental records. Prior to her death, Fleszar had been severely beaten, stabbed dozens of times in the chest and abdomen, and many of her limbs were severed or missing. Though never convicted for her murder, John Norman Chapman is believed to be responsible.	Murdered	1 month
August 19th, 1967	Christine Darby	7	United Kingdom	Darby was a young girl who was raped and murdered by Raymond Leslie Morris. He had hidden her body in Cannock Chase, less than 3 miles from the bodies of two other suspected victims. Morris is suspected in an abduction and two other murders, known as the Cannock Chase murders, but was never convicted.	Murdered	3 days
August 31st or September 1st, 1967	Keith Hird	27	United Kingdom	Keith Hird, an English footballer, went missing and was later found drowned in the River Tyne in what was ruled a suicide.	Died (Suicide)	1 week
September 25, 1967	Roy George Benn	59	United States of America	Benn was last seen alive at approximately 4:00 AM, eating breakfast in a restaurant along Highway 10 in Sartell, Minnesota. He was reportedly carrying a large sum of money at the time of his disappearance. Benn was declared legally dead in 1975. On August 9, 2025, a fisherman detected an unidentified object 20 feet under water in the Mississippi River near Sartell; on August 13, Stearns-Benton County Sheriff's Office recovered a vehicle which has since been possitively identified as Roy Benn's. Human remains were discovered inside the car during processing.	Died	58 years
October 29th, 1967	Jack McVitie	35	United Kingdom	Jack McVitie, who went by "Jack the Hat", was an enforcer for the Kray twins, and disappeared on 29 October 1967 in Stoke Newington, London, England after being lured to a party where he was assaulted and murdered. His body was then wrapped in an eiderdown and left outside a church. The twins ordered the body be better disposed and it was never seen again, allegedly thrown into the sea. Associates of the Kray twins were later charged and convicted of his murder.	Murdered	Never found
December 6th, 1967	Barbara Ann Hackmann Taylor	24	United States of America	Barbara Ann Hackmann Taylor disappeared on December 6, 1967, and was found dead near Georgetown, Kentucky on May 17, 1968. Her unidentified body found wrapped in canvas, similar to that used for a tent, and she was dubbed "Tent Girl". The son-in-law of the man who discovered her body had an interest in the case and contacted her relatives after seeing a missing persons report. Barbara Taylor's remains were positively identified in 1998 following DNA testing.	Murdered	5 months

=== 1968 ===
Date	Person(s)	Age	Country of disappearance	Circumstances	Outcome	Time spent missing or unconfirmed
April 23rd, 1968	Roy Tutill	14	United Kingdom	Tutill was an English schoolboy who was kidnapped while en route from the Kingston Grammar School to his home in Brockham. His body, showing signs of rape, was found three days later near Cherkley Court. The remained unsolved until 2001, when the perpetrator's DNA was matched to Brian Lunn Field, a long-time suspect with a history of abusing little boys. He was sentenced to life imprisonment for the crime, which is currently the oldest solved cold case in the United Kingdom.	Murdered	3 days
June 25th, 1968	Richard Robison Sr.	42	United States	A wealthy upper-middle-class family from Lathrup Village who were shot and killed inside their Lake Michigan holiday cottage on June 25, 1968. The murders were never solved, but are strongly believed to have been committed by an embezzling senior employee of one of Richard Robison Sr.'s businesses named Joseph Scolaro III. The alleged perpetrator committed suicide in 1973.	Murdered	1 month
June 25th, 1968	Shirley Robison	40	United States	A wealthy upper-middle-class family from Lathrup Village who were shot and killed inside their Lake Michigan holiday cottage on June 25, 1968. The murders were never solved, but are strongly believed to have been committed by an embezzling senior employee of one of Richard Robison Sr.'s businesses named Joseph Scolaro III. The alleged perpetrator committed suicide in 1973.	Murdered	1 month
June 25th, 1968	Richard Robison Jr.	19	United States	A wealthy upper-middle-class family from Lathrup Village who were shot and killed inside their Lake Michigan holiday cottage on June 25, 1968. The murders were never solved, but are strongly believed to have been committed by an embezzling senior employee of one of Richard Robison Sr.'s businesses named Joseph Scolaro III. The alleged perpetrator committed suicide in 1973.	Murdered	1 month
June 25th, 1968	Gary Robison	16	United States	A wealthy upper-middle-class family from Lathrup Village who were shot and killed inside their Lake Michigan holiday cottage on June 25, 1968. The murders were never solved, but are strongly believed to have been committed by an embezzling senior employee of one of Richard Robison Sr.'s businesses named Joseph Scolaro III. The alleged perpetrator committed suicide in 1973.	Murdered	1 month
June 25th, 1968	Randall Robison	12	United States	A wealthy upper-middle-class family from Lathrup Village who were shot and killed inside their Lake Michigan holiday cottage on June 25, 1968. The murders were never solved, but are strongly believed to have been committed by an embezzling senior employee of one of Richard Robison Sr.'s businesses named Joseph Scolaro III. The alleged perpetrator committed suicide in 1973.	Murdered	1 month
June 25th, 1968	Susan Robison	7	United States	A wealthy upper-middle-class family from Lathrup Village who were shot and killed inside their Lake Michigan holiday cottage on June 25, 1968. The murders were never solved, but are strongly believed to have been committed by an embezzling senior employee of one of Richard Robison Sr.'s businesses named Joseph Scolaro III. The alleged perpetrator committed suicide in 1973.	Murdered	1 month
July 31st, 1968	Brian Howe	3	United Kingdom	The second victim of child murderer Mary Bell. Howe was strangled to death on a peace of waste ground on May 31, 1968; his body was discovered the same evening.	Murdered	7 hours
September 10th, 1968	Susan Ellsworth Perry	17	United States of America	Perry disappeared from Barnstable County, Massachusetts, on 10 September 1968. Her dismembered body was discovered in February 1969.	Murdered	5 months
December 16th, 1968	Roger Dale Madison	15	United States of America	Roger Dale Madison was last seen leaving his home in the 14500 block of Sayre Street in Sylmar, California on December 16, 1968. The serial killer Mack Ray Edwards was convicted of the murder.	Murdered	Never found
December 17th, 1968	Barbara Mackle	20	United States of America	Mackle was kidnapped from her home by prison escapee Gary Steven Krist and his accomplice, Ruth Eisemann-Schier, on December 17, 1968, with her kidnappers demanding a $500,000 ransom for her release. She was rescued on December 20, having been detained underground throughout her ordeal.	Found alive	3 days

=== 1969 ===
Date	Person(s)	Age	Country of disappearance	Circumstances	Outcome	Time spent missing or unconfirmed
January, 1969	Reyna Marroquín	27	United States of America	Reyna Marroquín, a pregnant Salvadoran woman, disappeared in 1969 from Nassau County, New York. Her remains were found on September 2, 1999, in the former Jericho, New York home of Howard B. Elkins, her former boss, sealed in a drum that was stored in a crawl space. Marroquín was having an affair with Elkins and DNA test showed that Elkins was the father of the fetus. Elkins committed suicide not long after police questioning.	Murdered	30 years
January 4th, 1969	Mary Annabelle Bjornson	21	United States of America	Bjornson was abducted and murdered by serial killer John Dwight Canaday on the evening of 4 January 1969. Her body was discovered two months after her murder.	Murdered	2 months
January 25th, 1969	Mary Ann Wysocki	23	United States of America	A Rhode Island College student last seen alive on 25 January 1969. Her dismembered body was discovered in woodland on 5 March.	Murdered	6 weeks
April 23rd, 1969	Linda Dawn Salee	22	United States of America	Salee was the last of four known victims of serial killer Jerry Brudos. She was abducted from a shopping mall parking lot on 23 April 1969 and subsequently raped and strangled at Brudos' home before her body was discarded in the Willamette River.	Murdered	2 weeks
May 16th, 1969	Donald Allen Todd	13	United States of America	Donald Allen Todd, 13, of Pacoima, California, disappeared May 16, 1969, after leaving school. He and another boy had been suspended for fighting and sent home; he was never seen alive again. His body was found that month by two children below a bridge just a mile and a half from his home; he had been sexually abused and shot with a .22 caliber handgun.	Murdered	up to 2 weeks
July 11th, 1969	Theodore Conrad	20	United States of America	On 11 July 1969, Theodore Conrad surreptitiously robbed the bank where he was employed and then vanished. He evaded capture for over 5 decades by moving around the country for several years before he finally settled down (under an assumed name) in Lynnfield, Massachusetts, where he died on 18 May 2021 without ever having been caught. Several months after his death, US Marshals located his grave from a newspaper's obituary page.	Died before identity was uncovered (natural causes)	52 years
August 25th 1969	Rosemary Calandriello	17	United States of America	Calandriello was an Atlantic Highlands, New Jersey high school student. Calandriello disappeared on August 25, 1969. Her body was never found, although convicted murderer and suspected serial killer Robert Zarinsky confessed to her abduction and murder; he was convicted of this offense in 1975.	Murdered	Never found
August 26th, 1969	Donald Shea	35	United States of America	Shea was a ranch hand at Spahn Ranch who was murdered by members of the Manson Family led by Charles Manson on 26 August 1969. He is believed to have been murdered due to having informed authorities of the Manson Family's criminal activities. Shea's body was recovered in December 1977; his autopsy revealed evidence of multiple incision wounds to the chest and blunt force trauma to the head.	Murdered	8 years
September 8th, 1969	Leigh Farrell Hainline Bonadies	24	United States of America	Bonadies disappeared on September 8, 1969 and was murdered by serial killer Gerard John Schaefer. Her skull was discovered at a construction site in Palm Beach County in April 1978.	Murdered	9 years
November 7th, 1969	Catherine Cesnik	27	United States of America	Cesnik was an American Catholic religious sister at the Archbishop Keough High School, Baltimore, Maryland who disappeared on November 7, 1969. Her body was found on January 3, 1970, near a garbage dump in Lansdowne. Nobody was ever charged, although priest Joseph Maskell is considered a viable suspect.	Murdered	2 months
November 11th, 1969	Joyce Malecki	20	United States of America	Joyce Malecki, American woman who disappeared on November 11, 1969, from Baltimore, Maryland and was found dead two days later after being killed.	Murdered	2 days
November 14th, 1969	Reet Jurvetson	19	United States of America	Reet Jurvetson, a Canadian-American woman, disappeared on November 14, 1969. Her body was found on November 16, 1969, in a dense bushland off Mulholland Drive in Los Angeles, California but she remained unidentified for 46 years until an online mortuary photograph was recognised by her family and friends. She had been stabbed over 150 times and her body was rolled down an embankment.	Murdered	46 years
December 29th, 1969	Peggy Rahn	9	United States of America	Two young girls who disappeared in Pompano Beach, Florida on 29 December 1969 and were found to have been murdered. They were never seen again and are believed to have been victims of serial killer Gerard John Schaefer.	Murdered	Never found
December 29th, 1969	Wendy Stevenson	8	United States of America	Two young girls who disappeared in Pompano Beach, Florida on 29 December 1969 and were found to have been murdered. They were never seen again and are believed to have been victims of serial killer Gerard John Schaefer.	Murdered	Never found
December 29th, 1969	Muriel Freda McKay	55	United Kingdom	McKay was a housewife kidnapped from her Wimbledon home on 29 December 1969. Her kidnappers had mistaken her for Anna Murdoch, then-wife of Rupert Murdoch. McKay's precise cause and date of death is unknown, although she is believed to have been kept alive by her kidnappers for at least three days. Her body was never found.	Murdered	Never found
