= John Edward Belliveau =

Canadian writer and journalist (1913–1998)

- Born: 1913; Moncton, New Brunswick
- Died: 1998 (aged 84–85)
- Spouse: Gertrude Adell Pujolas (m. 1940)
- Children: 5

John Edward Belliveau (1913 – 1998) was a Canadian writer and journalist from Moncton, New Brunswick, particularly known for his 1956 book The Coffin Murder Case concerning the Coffin affair. Belliveau's articles were published in various newspapers in Canada such as the Moncton Transcript, the Windsor Star, the Toronto Star, and the Star Weekly.

== Life and career ==
Belliveau was born in 1913 in Moncton, New Brunswick, and began his career in journalism in the 1930s with the Moncton Transcript. He got married in 1940, and after having their first child his wife left her employment with the local lumber company. Belliveau subsequently began looking to grow his career in journalism, and was hired as a reporter with the Windsor Star in 1941. His family then moved from New Brunswick to Windsor, Ontario. In 1942, Belliveau became the Chatham bureau chief at The Star, and then moved his family to Chatham. He later began working as a columnist for the Toronto Star, where he spent a total of 16 years.

Belliveau was among the journalists who covered the murder trial of Wilbert Coffin, known as the "Coffin affair", while working as a reporter for the Toronto Star. Belliveau released his first book in 1956 titled The Coffin Murder Case, and would go on to testify at the Quebec royal commission which inquired into the hanging of Coffin. The royal commission heard that less than two hours after the death of Coffin, his last will and testament was sold to the Toronto Star by one of Coffin's lawyers in a deal brokered by Belliveau. The Toronto Star published the will in full on 10 February 1956, and the will was included in The Coffin Murder Case later that year.

Belliveau became involved in politics in 1958, when he joined the campaign of John Wintermeyer; he then served as acting director of the Liberal Party of Ontario. In 1960, Belliveau became the vice-president of public affairs at Tandy Advertising in Toronto. During his time at Tandy Advertising, Belliveau managed the successful election campaign of Louis Robichaud in New Brunswick. He further advised other Canadian politicians on their election campaigns, such as Alex Campbell, the 23rd premier of Prince Edward Island; and Gerald Regan, the 19th premier of Nova Scotia. In 1963, Belliveau worked as a campaign advisor and speech writer for Lester B. Pearson, the 14th prime minister of Canada, after having done work for Pearson the year prior.

After the FLQ murder of Pierre Laporte, the Ministry of Justice insisted on Premier Louis Robichaud spending his final days as Premier ahead of the 1970 election in seclusion with an RCMP detail - staying at the house of Belliveau.

Belliveau published several other books throughout his career, such as The Splendid Life of Albert Smith and the Women he Left Behind (1976), concerning the life of the New Brunswick politician Albert James Smith; and Running Far In: The Story of Shediac (1977), a history of the town of Shediac, New Brunswick. In addition to his published literature, Belliveau compiled genealogical resources on the Belliveau and Sumner families as well as a written history of the Moncton Club. Belliveau's final published book, Iceboats to Superferries: An Illustrated History of Marine Atlantic (1992), was written alongside Silver Donald Cameron and Michael Harrington and covers the history of Marine Atlantic and ferry services in the Maritimes.

Belliveau died in Moncton on 26 March 1998, at the age of 84.

== Personal life ==
Belliveau married his wife, Gertrude Adell Belliveau (née Pujolas), in 1940 at St. Bernard's Church in Moncton, New Brunswick. Belliveau and his wife had five sons; including Bill Belliveau, founder of the magazine Atlantic Insight.

== Publications ==
=== Books ===
- Belliveau, John Edward (June 1956). The Coffin Murder Case. Toronto, ON: Kingswood House. OCLC 16884175.
- — (1976). The Splendid Life of Albert Smith and the Women he Left Behind. Windsor, NS: Lancelot Press. ISBN 978-0-8899-9053-1. OCLC 0889990530.
- — (1977). Running Far In: The Story of Shediac. Windsor, NS: Lancelot Press. ISBN 978-0-8899-9070-8. OCLC 16884175.
- — (1980). Little Louis and the Giant KC. Windsor, NS: Lancelot Press. ISBN 978-0-8899-9132-3. OCLC 7445716.
- — (1981). The Monctonians Volume 1: Citizens, Saints, and Scoundrels. Windsor, NS: Lancelot Press. ISBN 978-0-88999-148-4. OCLC 9020111.
- — (1981). The Monctonians Volume 2: Scamps, Scholars and Politicians. Windsor, NS: Lancelot Press. ISBN 978-0-8899-9171-2.
- — (1984). The Headliners: Behind the Scenes Memoirs. Windsor, NS: Lancelot Press. ISBN 978-0-8899-9248-1. OCLC 12130693.
- — (1986). "Crackie": The Sumner Family Business Dynasty. Windsor, NS: Lancelot Press. ISBN 978-0-8899-9315-0. OCLC 15715580.
- — (1990). The Monctonians. Vol. 1–2 (Special Centennial ed.). Windsor, NS: Lancelot Press. ISBN 978-0-8899-9148-4. OCLC 1064395985.
- —; Cameron, Silver Donald; Harrington, Michael (1992). Iceboats to Superferries: An Illustrated History of Marine Atlantic. Newfoundland: Breakwater. ISBN 978-1-5508-1027-1. OCLC 27066532.

=== Selected articles ===
- — (22 December 1986). "Stories by J. E. Belliveau, photos from his collection". The Times-Transcript. Moncton, NB – via Newspapers.com.
- — (27 May 1989). "Fever in the family". The Times-Transcript. Moncton, NB – via Newspapers.com.
- — (6 July 1996). "An octogenarian's tale". Telegraph-Journal. Saint John, NB – via Newspapers.com.
- — (12 October 1996). "Making a case for the wharf: The Pointe du Chene wharf once hummed with life". The Times-Transcript. Moncton, NB – via Newspapers.com.
