= Roy George Benn =

Roy Benn
- Born: Roy George Benn; April 29, 1908; Codington County, South Dakota, U.S.
- Disappeared: September 25, 1967 (aged 59); Sartell, Minnesota, U.S.
- Body discovered: August 9, 2025
- Known for: Missing person and being found dead

Roy George Benn (April 29, 1908 – September 25, 1967) was a 59-year-old businessman from Sauk Rapids, Minnesota, who disappeared on September 25, 1967, and remained missing for 58 years until his remains were discovered in 2025.

== Background ==
Roy George Benn was a resident of Sauk Rapids in Benton County, Minnesota. At the time of his disappearance, he operated the St. Cloud Appliance Repair Service. Benn was described as 5'08" tall, weighing 185 pounds, with dark brown (thinning) hair and gray eyes. He was a widower, as his wife had died the year prior to his disappearance, according to St. Cloud Daily Times archives.

== Disappearance ==
On September 25, 1967, Benn was last seen at approximately 4:00 AM eating breakfast at King's Supper Club along Highway 10 in Sartell, Minnesota. He was reportedly wearing a dark-colored suit, a white French-cuffed shirt, and a pair of gold and pearl cufflinks. According to the Minnesota Bureau of Criminal Apprehension, he was driving his 1963 four-door metallic blue Buick Electra with Minnesota license plate 6DU 516. Authorities reported that Benn was carrying a large sum of money when he was last seen.

The Benton County Sheriff's Office opened a missing person investigation following Benn's disappearance. According to investigators, no one ever used Benn's credit cards, wrote any checks on his bank account, or re-licensed his car anywhere following his disappearance. Benn was declared legally dead in 1975, eight years after he went missing.

== Investigation ==
The initial investigation in 1967 included searches of various locations. According to Sartell Police Chief Brandon Silgjord, original case files indicated that authorities considered both quarries and the Mississippi River as potential search areas, though technology in the 1960s was limited compared to modern capabilities. Walter Benn, Roy's brother, collaborated with law enforcement following the disappearance, and investigators pursued various leads that did not resolve the case. In 1968, Walter Benn prepared his brother's belongings for auction, as noted in St. Cloud Daily Times archives.

=== Discovery of Vehicle and Remains ===
On August 9, 2025, fisherman Brody Loch detected an object underwater using sonar equipment while fishing on the Mississippi River near Sartell. The discovery occurred after his fishing companion caught a walleye, prompting Loch to turn his transducer around. Loch returned the following day with his family to confirm the find before contacting authorities.

On August 13, 2025, the Stearns-Benton County Sheriff's Office Dive Team, with assistance from Collins Brothers Towing, recovered a 1960s-era Buick from the Mississippi River near the 300 block of Riverside Avenue North in Sartell. The vehicle was found 20 feet underwater and was removed fairly intact despite concerns that prolonged submersion might cause it to disintegrate during recovery.

=== Identification ===
Investigators positively identified the vehicle through its Vehicle Identification Number (VIN) as belonging to Roy Benn. Human remains were discovered inside the car during processing at the Sartell Police Department. The remains were transported to the Midwest Medical Examiner's Office for further investigation and possible identification. Based on the human remains, items found in the car, and verification of the VIN, authorities believe the remains to be those of Benn.

=== Current Status ===
The case has been turned over to the Benton County Sheriff's Office for further investigation. Sheriff Troy Heck indicated that some standard identification techniques typically used by medical examiners may not be effective due to the extended period the remains were submerged. Authorities had previously contacted Benn's surviving relatives to obtain familial DNA samples.

== See also ==
- List of solved missing person cases (1950–1969)
