= Murder of Harry Baker =

1958 murder in Merseyside, England

- Location: Merseyside, England
- Date: c. 6 June 1958; 68 years ago
- Attack type: Homicide by strangulation
- Victims: Harry Baker, aged 61
- Perpetrator: Unknown
- Motive: Unknown

Harry Baker (1897 – c. 6 June 1958) was a 61-year-old British credit draper whose murder led to one of the biggest manhunts Merseyside has ever known. His murder in 1958 remains unsolved.

== Background information ==
Harry Baker was a 61-year-old credit draper from Southport. He was last seen alive on 6 June 1958. He had been due to visit a house at 1.10 pm but never arrived. His last confirmed sighting was at 1.45 pm when witnesses saw him talking to an unidentified man at a bus stop on Strand Road, Bootle.

== Murder ==
On 23 June, seventeen days after he vanished, Baker's body was found, amid pink and purple rhododendrons, wrapped in two sacks on a plantation off the main A50 trunk road at High Legh, near Knutsford, Cheshire. He had been beaten and strangled. The police ascertained the body had been there at least two weeks. Missing from his person were £25 (£511.98 in September 2025), two watches, and a fountain pen.

One of the biggest manhunts Merseyside has ever known was mounted by the police. At the height of the investigation, 20,000 people were interviewed, 9,000 statements were taken, and replies were obtained to 10,000 questionnaires. Unfortunately, the positive placing of Baker's movements while he was alive came to a dead stop at that number 23 bus stop.

In 1966, eight years after the murder, Detective Chief Inspector Bill Cotter, head of the Bootle C.I.D., remarked to the Echo: "The Baker death is still very much in the minds of police officers. The file will, of course, remain open until the killer or killers of this man come to book, even if it takes another eight years".

== Suspects ==
One theory that was propounded by detectives on the case was that the killer (or killers) had fled abroad before the body was discovered. This led police to check departures from the UK as well as overseas as the inquiry proceeded. Information still trickled in about the crime from time to time in the years following Baker's murder, but no significant headway was ever made, nor any leads found.

== See also ==
- List of solved missing person cases: 1950–1999
- List of unsolved murders in the United Kingdom
