= J. K. Rideout =

British linguist (1912–1950)

J.K. Rideout
- Born: John Kennedy Rideout; 1912; Leeds, West Yorkshire, England
- Disappeared: 16 February 1950 (aged 37–38)
- Died: c. 16 February 1950 (aged 37–38); Hong Kong
- Body discovered: Lantau Island, Hong Kong
- Education: University of London
- Occupation: Linguist

John Kennedy Rideout (1912 - 1950) was a British Professor of Oriental Studies at the University of Sydney (succeeding Arthur Lindsay Sadler) and at the University of Hong Kong from Leeds. A specialist in Chinese language and literature, he was a classical scholar at Oxford before pursuing studies in Far Eastern languages from the School of Oriental and African Studies, where he also taught from 1942. He left the University of Sydney after one year, having found the library without Chinese books, and the Australian National University willing to loan the single book they had received from the Chinese ambassador, Kan Nai-kuang.

== History ==
Rideout was a graduate of the University of Oxford and studied Oriental languages at the School of Oriental and African Studies. During the Second World War, he trained Chinese translators for the war in the British Raj and Burma. After the war, Rideout moved to the University of Sydney to become its Head of Oriental Studies. However, he discovered the University's library only held a handful of Japanese books and only one Chinese text. He formally asked the Australian National University to lend him a copy of a compilation of Chinese texts that they had received from the Chinese Ambassador to Australia. The ANU agreed on the grounds that they had no one there who was able to read the Chinese texts and they were not planning to accept Oriental studies students for two more years. However, Rideout eventually left the University of Sydney for the University of Hong Kong on the grounds that Sydney had limited teaching resources.

== Disappearance and aftermath ==
Rideout disappeared in British Hong Kong on 16 February 1950, and his body found twelve days later on the shores of Lantau Island, with some suspicion about a mooted connection to British intelligence whilst others suggested he was assassinated by Chinese Communist agents, though the authorities ruled the death an accident as "misadventure by drowning".

== See also ==
- List of solved missing person cases (1950–1969)
