= Bordeaux Prison =

Prison in Canada

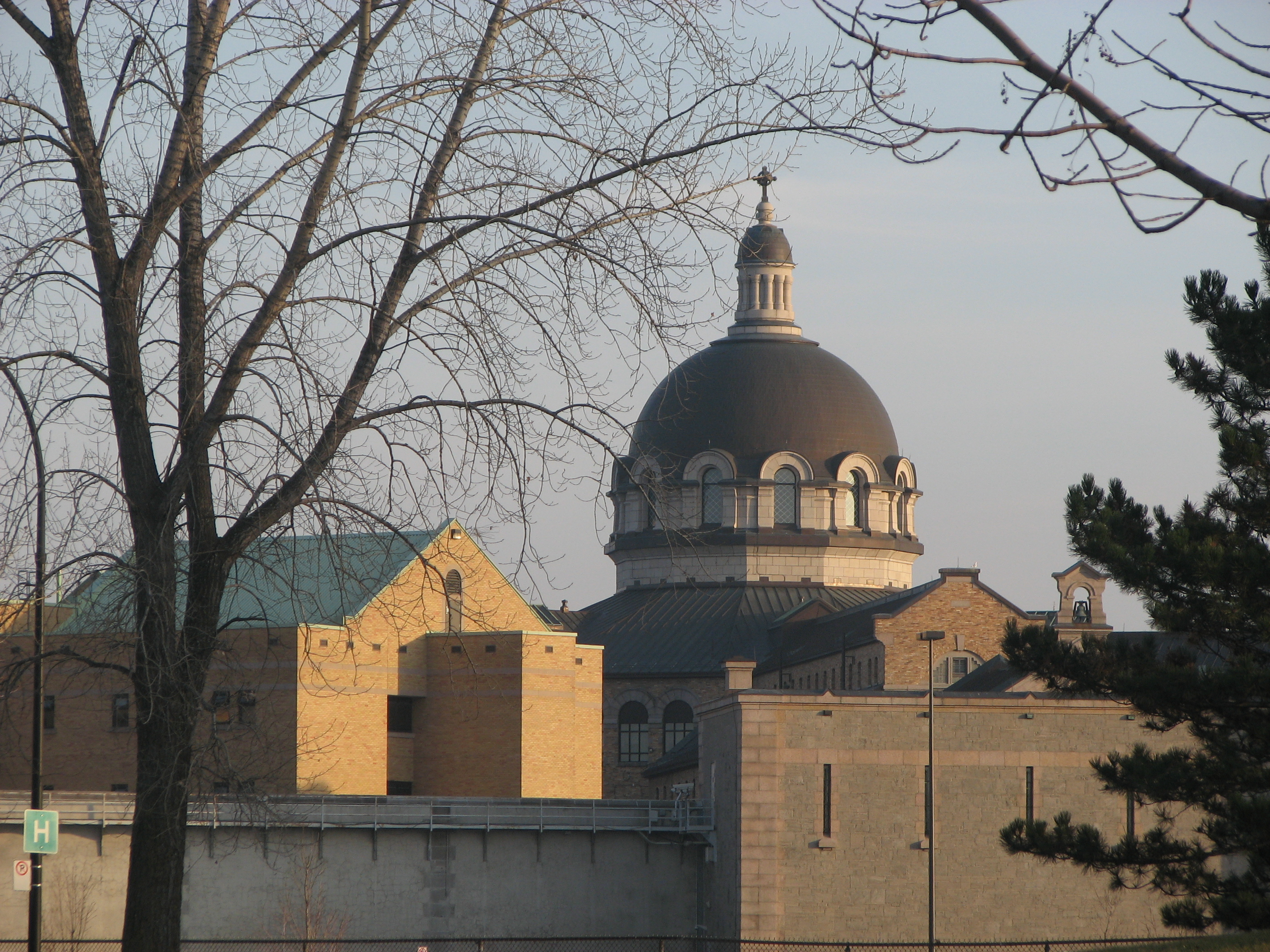
- Interactive map of Bordeaux Prison
- Location: 800, boulevard Gouin Ouest Montreal, Quebec, Canada; 45.545°N 73.686°W
- Status: Operational
- Security class: Various
- Capacity: about 1500
- Opened: 1912
- Managed by: Quebec Ministry of Public Security

The Bordeaux Prison (French: Prison de Bordeaux), also known as the Montreal Detention Centre, is a provincial prison in Montreal, Quebec, Canada. It is located at 800 Gouin Boulevard West in the borough of Ahuntsic-Cartierville.

The prison was built between 1908 and 1912 by architect Jean-Omer Marchand to replace the aged Pied-du-Courant Prison. The prison currently houses male inmates sentenced to less than two years' imprisonment. It also houses prisoners awaiting trial.

It is the largest provincial prison in Quebec, with a maximum capacity of almost 1500 inmates.

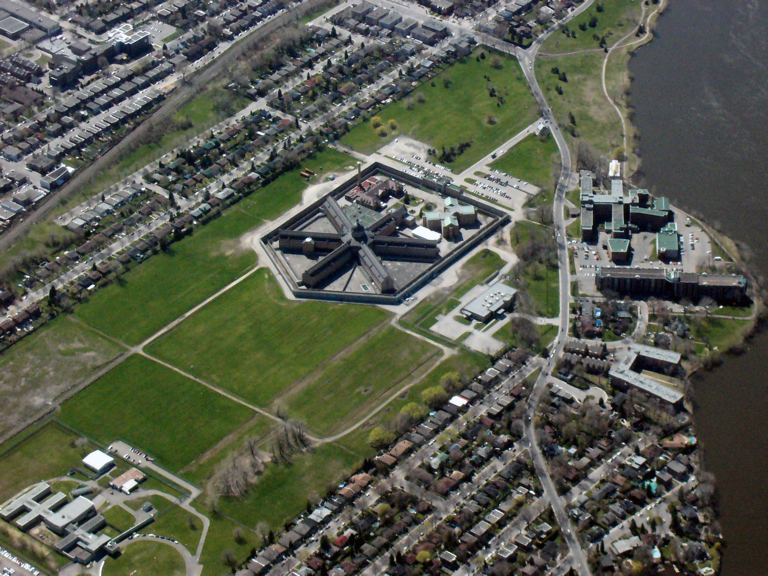
Aerial view of Bordeaux Prison in the Northern part of the Island of Montreal

The prison was also an execution site, where 85 hangings were carried out by Quebec between 1912 and 1960.

On Christmas Day, 2022, a 21-year old inmate died after being pepper sprayed by staff while wearing a spit hood in a shower and then left face down in a cell, despite a court having ordered his release on December 23. Investigations by La Presse and The Globe and Mail found that prison staff violated internal policies on the use of pepper spray. A unit manager and a guard were suspended. In addition to the standard coroner investigation, the incident is also subject to an investigation by the Sûreté du Québec and the provincial Ministry of Public Security.

== Notable inmates ==
- Adrien Arcand – leader of the National Unity Party of Canada; held at Bordeaux Prison for several weeks during his internment in World War II for openly supporting Nazi Germany and allegedly plotting against the state
- Albert Guay – mass murderer who conspired to blow up Canadian Pacific Air Lines Flight 108; executed in 1951
- Généreux Ruest – mass murderer who conspired to blow up Canadian Pacific Air Lines Flight 108; executed in 1952
- Marguerite Pitre – mass murderer who conspired to blow up Canadian Pacific Air Lines Flight 108; and last woman to be hanged in Canada; executed in 1953
- Wilbert Coffin – Coffin affair; executed in 1956
- Lucien Rivard - Held there while awaiting extradition to the United States.
