= Audrey Backeberg =

Formerly missing American woman

- Born: Audrey Jean Good; 1942 (age 83–84)
- Known for: disappearance and being re-discovered
- Spouse: Ronald Backeberg
- Children: 2

Audrey Jean Good Backeberg is an American formerly missing woman who went missing at age 20 on July 7, 1962, and resurfaced in 2025.

== Background and disappearance ==
Audrey Good had married Ronald Backeberg on August 17, 1957. The couple lived in Reedsburg, Wisconsin, and had two children.

Backeberg disappeared from a bus stop in Indianapolis, Indiana, just days after a report was made to the local police that her husband was abusing her to the point of threatening her life. Backeberg was with someone who said that they were both hitchhiking where they took a Greyhound bus.

== Reappearance ==
Backeberg remained missing until 2025, when investigators located her alive and well in another state using information pulled from her sister's Ancestry.com profile. She chose not to disclose much information, but investigators say the aforementioned husband may or may not have been her reason for vanishing without a trace. She also chose not to give out her current location, and having since remarried and has two children, she also chose not to give out her current legal name.

== See also ==
- List of solved missing person cases (1950–1969)
