= Death of Henri Le Masne =

1954 death in the Alps

Henri Le Masne
- Born: 1919
- Disappeared: 1954 (aged 35); Italian Alps
- Died: 1954 (aged 34–35); Italian Alps
- Body discovered: 2005
- Known for: Disappearance and being found underneath a receded glacier in the Italian Alps in 2005

Henri Le Masne was a French man who went missing on March 26, 1954, while he was skiing during a storm in the Italian Alps. His body was found in 2005, after a glacier had receded.

== Disappearance ==
Le Manse was an avid skier and hiker who on his birthday, went on a ski trip on March 26, 1954 and disappeared after a storm had taken place.

== Discovery of body ==
On July 22, 2005, the remains of a skier were found at 3,100 meters elevation on a glacier in Valtournenche, Cime Bianche by the authorities. In 2017, the remains were analyzed. Tests showed they were from a man around 30 years old, about 1.65 meters tall. Inspection of this clothing and personal items indicated he had died no earlier than winter 1950, come from a wealthy background, and was likely of French origin.

In 2018, a French woman named Emma Nassem came forward, believing the man to be her missing uncle, Henri Le Masne, who disappeared on the Matterhorn during a storm on his birthday in 1954. Subsequent DNA tests confirmed the remains to be his. Le Masne was a resident of Paris who worked in the finance ministry, described as "quite independent".

== Aftermath ==
The story has appeared on many news channels which featured his remains and his items that were found with him when he was discovered.

== See also ==
- List of solved missing person cases (1950–1969)
