= Murder of Timo Rinnelt =

1964 murder and staged kidnapping of a 7-year-old boy in Wiesbaden, West Germany

- Location: 50°04′55″N 8°14′41″E; Wilhelmstraße, Wiesbaden, Hesse, Germany
- Date: 13 February 1964
- Attack type: Strangulation, child murder
- Weapon: Electric cable
- Perpetrator: Klaus Lehnert
- Convictions: Murder

On 13 February 1964, 7-year-old Timo Rinnelt was murdered in Wiesbaden, Hesse, Germany. The case led to the most extensive missing persons search in post-war German history until that point.

In the month following Rinnelt's disappearance, a letter claimed that Rinnelt was kidnapped and demanded ransom, which, despite the efforts of family and police via phone communications, was never negotiated to a handover. After the kidnapper stopped responding, the case was archived.

In April 1967, the perpetrator resurfaced after a local newspaper wrote about new developments in voice analysis. Over the course of a month, four new ransom letters were sent out, renewing the previous demands for money. An item of clothing dropped off by Rinnelt's kidnapper was found to have traces of decomposed tissue and under the assumption that the victim was dead, the investigation shifted towards locating the kidnapper. The same month, 26-year-old Klaus Lehnert, a neighbour and family friend of the Rinnelts, was arrested.

Lehnert confessed that he had killed Rinnelt the day of his abduction on the same street he lived on and staged the ransom in order to hide the murder. He was sentenced to life imprisonment in August 1968, but granted parole in 1985 to live under a new identity.

== Background ==
=== Victim ===
Timo Rinnelt was born to Carmen and Joachim Rinnelt. His father was an antique salesman and he had two older stepbrothers. The family live in Bautzen, East Germany before crossing the border in 1959, committing Republikflucht in the process. The Rinnelt family lived in a tenement on Wilhelmstraße 17.

=== Perpetrator ===
Klaus Lehnert was born on 12 April 1941 in Wiesbaden, as the second of four sons of a wealthy local physician. In 1954, Lehnert nearly drowned in a swimming pool before being rescued by bystander Günther Rabe. In 1955, Lehnert's father died at age 70 and his mother, 32 years younger than her husband, married Rabe. Lehnert never accepted his new stepfather and blamed Rabe for causing his father's death, reasoning that the embarrassment of having his son rescued by a younger man, thus earning the favor of his wife, caused his long-standing illness to worsen. Lehnert's mother was left with an inheritance, sharing 20,000 DM with her son. She continued to retain ownership of her late husband's doctor's office on Wilhelmstraße 58.

Lehnert dropped out before completing 11th grade in Realgymnasium and after he failed to attain Abitur at a private school in Berlin, his already strained relationship with his stepfather worsened. Lehnert was frequently unemployed, sometimes working at a paper deliveryman or laundry worker. He had a criminal record for theft and fraud. Lehnert lived with his step-grandmother in the same apartment building as the Rinnelts, in the floor above, and became known as a partying playboy who lived well-above his actual income. At the time of the murder, he was in a long-term relationship with the daughter of a publisher, for whom he occasionally worked in photo development. At his murder trial, Lehnert admitted to experiencing nightmares and daydreams of his dead father, which contributed to his belief that his mother and stepfather had faked the elder Lehnert's death. Lehnert subsequently searched numerous retirement homes and hospitals for any sign of his father. There had also been a rumor amongst his friends that Lehnert was a closeted homosexual after he was reportedly seen exiting a gay bar, but this was ultimately never confirmed and deemed unlikely by a court psychologist.

== Murder and kidnapping hoax ==
On 13 February 1964, shortly before 18:00, Rinnelt was playing outside the tenement when he was approached by then-22-year-old Klaus Lehnert, who lured Rinnelt to the basement of Wilhelmstraße 58. Under unclear circumstances, Rinnelt was asphyxiated by Lehnert.

The following day, a letter arrived in the mailbox of the Rinnelts. The envelope contained the key for a luggage box at Frankfurt Hauptbahnhof and when Rinnelt's brothers opened it, they found a message demanding 15,000 DM ransom, along with one of Rinnelt's shoes. Despite instructions to the contrary, the family alerted police and after the kidnapper began phoning the family's landline, the calls were monitored and recorded. The kidnapper, using a voice distorter, had reiterated his demands, but actively avoided the subject of organising a drop-off for the money. Meanwhile, Lehnert made frequent visits to the Rinnelt family to offer emotional support.

There was initially a media blackout on the disappearance, but it was lifted on 21 February, leading to widespread reporting across Germany. Reporters interviewed all residents of Wilhelmstraße 17, most prominently Klaus Lehnert. Newspapers offered to pay the 15,000 DM ransom to free Rinnelt, leading to a number of false hoax callers admitting to the crime to cash in the money. On 24 February, editor-in-chief was notified by two men claiming to be the abductors and agreed to meet them at Frankfurt Hauptbahnhof. A masked man gave him a key to an abandoned house in Wiesbaden, where Rinnelt was supposedly being held, but after finding it empty, the reporter called police. The following night, police arrested 17-year-old Erich Klein and 21-year-old Rudolf Bialek at a bar, in possession of 13,585 DM, and it was quickly revealed that they were uninvolved in the disappearance, having simply used the opportunity to cash in the money. In total, 40 people were arrested for making false statements to receive the ransom.

The search effort was extensive. For weeks, Hesse State Police, aided by Bundeswehr personnel, patrolled forests, apartment areas, and forests for clues, and went so far as to drain the 6-square hectar pond in Kurpark. A local mall dressed up a child-sized mannequin in the clothes Rinnelt was last seen in, along with a sign with information about his last known movements. Police were willing to not only pay the ransom in full, but also give the kidnapper(s) a six-hour headstart to escape unimpeded in exchange for Rinnelt's guaranteed safety.

On 3 March, television stations broadcast the audio of the kidnapper's phone calls. Police issued rewards for information, first 2,000 DM, then 12,000 DM and finally 50,000 DM.

As the Rinnelts were GDR defectors, East German media used the case as propaganda to highlight the lack of security in West Germany, claiming the child would have been safer if the family had never left. GDR state agencies went as far as to conduct covert journalistic investigations in Wiesbaden while filming a documentary about the case. West German authorities went as far as to speculate that Rinnelt's parents were undercover GDR agents who purposly hid their son to cause a cause célèbre in the BRD. The Rinnelts had immigrated with much furniture and significant funds, which was unusual since most East German refugees only brought along single luggage.

On 18 March 1964, the search effort was called off due to a lack of leads and the investigative unit disbanded. In the following three years, Lehnert moved to a flat in Viktoriastraße 11 and laid low. In the following three years, hoax calls continued to sporadically appear.

=== Renewed letters ===
On 20 April 1967, Wiesbadener Kurier published an article about the visit of American engineer Lawrence G. Kersta to the Federal Criminal Police Office. Kersta had researched voice identification for the FBI and showed interest in introducing the technique to other police agencies across the world. The article was headline titled "Soon, you will be recognisable by your voice" ("An ihrer Stimme wird man sie demnächst erkennen"). Upon reading the news, Lehnert became terrified that his archived phone calls will be processed through this method once implemented and decided to again make demands for ransom, hoping to use it in order to flee the country.

On 26 April, Lehnert sent a ransom letter to the Munich headquarters of the magazine Quick, using the signature "M". The editors alerted Wiesbaden's Kripo, who, despite reservations due to previous hoaxes, cooperated with the magazine to reopen communications with the kidnapper. After receiving a coded agreement through a specific column of Wiesbadener Kurier, Lehnert sent a second letter on 3 May, offering to give up Rinnelt's other shoe to prove his authenticity. A meet-up at the Großen Burgstraße in Wiesbaden with a reporter was organised, secretly supervised by police, but Lehnert did not show up. In a third letter on 10 May, Lehnert claimed to have lost the shoe and that he instead would give them one of Rinnelt's socks, to be left at a weather house on Neroberg. To this handover, a police officer was sent disguised as a journalist, retrieving the sock from a tree branch. Immediately, the smell of decomposition was noticed and further confirmed by forensic analysis. A fourth letter was sent on 17 May, demanding that the 15,000 DM ransom be delivered in 50 DM banknotes at a to-be-named location. Police once again decided to use an undercover officer and while discussing the upcoming meeting with a journalist at Parkhotel, the officer spotted Lehnert sitting at a nearby café. The officer recognised him as a recurring and talkative witness during the initial investigation, photographed him and quickly named Lehnert as the prime suspect for the identity of "M".

=== Handover and arrest ===
By the evening, Lehnert decided that the handover would occur at in the Nerotalanlagen, at the war memorial statue. More than a hundred Bereitschaftspolizei were used to surveil the area, some disguised as romantic couples. At the meeting spot, the undercover officer found a typed note instructing him to meet at the top of Neroberg, from where on, several more notes would take the officer throughout the park. Finally, a message read to leave the money package on the spot, near a beaten path. The package was then rigged with a tripwire which would activate a set of fireworks in a bush two metres away. The observation lasted until the morning of 18 May, when Lehnert arrived in a borrowed VW car and retrieved the package without triggering the trap. With confirmation of Lehnert's guilt, he was apprehended at his home on 24 May, with a subsequent house search finding two typewriters used to author the letters to Quick.

Lehnert refused to tell officers about the status or location of Rinnelt. On 29 May, however, a notary who was renting the old doctor's office of Lehnert's father called police and advised them to search the basement of Wilhelmstraße 58. Inside, officers discovered a lightwell filled up with mortar and digging it up, they found the body of Rinnelt wrapped in a carpet and plastic bags. It was determined that he was most likely strangled with an electric cable, which was found in a quintuple knot around Rinnelt's neck. Following this, Lehnert confessed the murder to his lawyer and then police. Lehnert told them that on the day of the murder, he was on his way to the basement to get photo developing trays and while passing Rinnelt, the boy asked to accompany him. He claimed to have no memory of what occurred in the basement, only stating that "something came over me". It was revealed by reporters who interviewed Lehnert during the first investigation that he had made disturbing comments about Rinnelt, such as "[Rinnelt] was not a pleasant and polite boy at all, but often whiny. Perhaps someone killed him accidentally and is staging the kidnapping". The family of a former girlfriend alleged that Lehnert once stated in early February 1964, "Timo is a fat piggy who needs to be slaughtered".

== Trial ==
Lehnert was held at Justizvollzugsanstalt Wiesbaden. His transport there was attended by several locals who threatened to lynch Lehnert for his crime. His trial began on 17 July 1968. Lehnert's defense argued that the circumstances of Rinnelt's death were accidental, theorising that Lehnert had accidentally choked him to death while "playing dog", using the cable as a leash. It was noted that Rinnelt had no defensive wounds. In the end, the prosecution successfully argued that Lehnert acted with malice aforethought and on 7 August 1968, he was sentenced to life imprisonment. The witnesses on the gallery cheered while the judge openly lamented that the death penalty had been outlawed.

After Lehnert served the mandatory 15 years imprisonment, he appealed for parole, which was granted in 1985.

== See also ==
- List of solved missing person cases (1950–1969)
