= Murder of Carol Ann Dougherty =

1962 child murder in Pennsylvania, United States

- Victim Carol Ann Dougherty
- Location: Bristol Borough, Pennsylvania, U.S.
- Date: October 22, 1962; 64 years ago c. 3:35 PM
- Attack type: Child murder by strangulation, child rape
- Victims: Carol Ann Dougherty, aged 9
- Inquiry: 2025 grand jury investigation concluding Schrader was responsible
- Accused: William Schrader (died 2002; not criminally charged)

Carol Ann Dougherty was a 9-year-old girl who was raped and murdered in Bristol, Pennsylvania, United States, on October 22, 1962. Her body was found in St. Mark's Roman Catholic Church, where she had stopped to pray on her way to return library books.

In 1994, William Schrader, a man who lived in Bristol Borough at the time of the murder, was extradicted to Pennsylvania from the south in connection with the case. He was released without charge.

The case is considered officially closed following the work of an investigative grand jury in Bucks County. District Attorney Jennifer Schorn announced the results on October 29, 2025, stating that the murderer was concluded to be William Schrader based on eyewitness accounts, a visual pubic hair analysis, and alleged confessions to Schrader's step-son.

== Crime ==
On the afternoon of October 22, 1962, Carol Ann Dougherty left her home in Bristol Borough to return books to the Bristol Free Library. She rode her bicycle to the library, but stopped at St. Mark's Church along the way, as was her habit to say a prayer when passing. When she did not return home by 4:30 PM, her parents became worried and went looking for her. Carol's father, Frank Dougherty, found her body on a landing leading to the choir loft of the church around 6:00 PM. She had been sexually assaulted and strangled to death. Police determined she was likely attacked around 3:35 PM.

== Investigations ==
=== Initial investigation ===
The initial investigation was conducted jointly by Bristol police, led by Chief Vincent Faragalli, and Pennsylvania State Police. Evidence collected included pubic hairs found in Carol's hand. Several suspects were investigated over the years, including:

- Frank Zuchero, a drunk handyman seen near the church, who initially confessed but was later deemed not credible;
- Wayne Roach, a 19-year-old whose parents reported finding Carol's name written in his notebook;
- Joseph Sabadish, a priest at St. Mark's whose alibi was found to be false;
- William Schrader, who was seen outside the church shortly after the estimated time of the murder.

Despite extensive investigation, including polygraph tests and grand jury testimony, no one was ever charged with the crime.

=== 1994 grand jury ===
In 1994, a grand jury was convened to investigate the murder and potentially indict a suspect. Two suspects, Joseph Sabadish and William Schrader, were brought before the grand jury, with Schrader having to be extradicted from Louisiana. Sabadish and Frank Dougherty testified, while Schrader invoked his Fifth Amendment right to not answer questions that could incriminate him. Both suspects passed polygraph tests, were not indicted, and released.

=== 2025 grand jury and closing of case ===
Under Bucks County District Attorney Jennifer Schorn, an investigative grand jury was convened to potentially bring the case to a close. The grand jury concluded that William Schrader was responsible for murdering Carol Ann Dougherty, based on eyewitness reports that Schrader had been seen near the church following the murder, confessions to the murder that Schrader allegedly made to his step-son, Schrader moving from Pennsylvania to the south soon after the murder, and the fact that Schrader could not be ruled out as a suspect from a pubic hair analysis. However, DNA evidence was too degraded to be properly analyzed. Schrader died in 2002.

Schrader had an extensive criminal history which included attempted murder, assault, domestic violence, the rapes and sexual assaults of women and girls, and a manslaughter conviction in 1985 for killing a 12-year-old girl in an arson attack which he committed in 1970.

== In popular culture ==
- In 2022, the murder of Marise Chiverella being solved sparked further conversations about the two Pennsylvania cases.
- In 2024, the true crime podcast The Coldest Murder helped to bring the case back into the public consciousness.

== See also ==
- List of unsolved murders (1900–1979)
- List of solved missing person cases (1950–1969)
