= Murder of Alexandra Wiwcharuk =

1962 murder in Saskatoon, Canada

Alexandra Wiwcharuk
- Died: May 18, 1962 (aged 23) at a riverbank in Saskatoon, Saskatchewan
- Body discovered: May 31, 1962
- Burial place: Woodlawn Cemetery, Saskatoon
- Occupation: Nurse

On May 18, 1962, 23-year-old Canadian nurse Alexandra Wiwcharuk disappeared in Saskatoon, Saskatchewan; her remains were discovered on a riverbank in Saskatoon on May 31, 1962. The case became one of the city's most enduring unsolved murder cases.

== Background ==
Alexandra Wiwcharuk grew up near Yorkton, Saskatchewan in a Greek Orthodox family. She attended Technical Collegiate in Saskatoon before training as a nurse in Yorkton, graduating in May 1961. The 23-year-old Wiwcharuk worked as a nurse at Saskatoon City Hospital. Before her death, she had also become known locally after being selected as "The Girl in Saskatoon" in a radio contest connected with a 1961 Johnny Cash concert.

== Disappearance and discovery of body ==
On the evening of May 18, 1962, Wiwcharuk left her home in Saskatoon's City Park neighbourhood. She stopped at a nearby drugstore and then went for a walk near the South Saskatchewan River. She was expected to return home and later work a shift at Saskatoon City Hospital, but she never arrived for work and did not return to her home. At the time of her disappearance, she was reported to have been wearing "lime green slacks, a black sweater, and a heavy green cardigan," and had not been carrying a purse.

A search for Wiwcharuk followed. Police "questioned all taxi drivers, and persons in bus, airline, and train offices," but found no leads.

Her remains were eventually discovered on May 31, 1962, 13 days after she disappeared, along the riverbank near the area where she had last been seen. She had been buried in a shallow grave.

Police determined that Wiwcharuk had been murdered. According to the Saskatoon Police Service, she had suffered a fractured skull and had been sexually assaulted, before being buried. An autopsy determined that she had died the night of May 18. Her official cause of death was suffocation. Her funeral was held on June 4, 1962, and she was buried in the Greek Orthodox section of Woodlawn Cemetery.

== Investigation and aftermath ==
Wiwcharuk's death resulted in a major investigation. Police interviewed hundreds of people and pursued numerous leads over the decades. Advances in forensic science, including DNA testing, have also been used in attempts to identify her killer. Despite the lengthy investigation, no one has been charged with her murder, and the case remains open.

In 2024, the Saskatoon Police Service again appealed to the public for information about her murder, stating that investigators remain in contact with her family.

== See also ==
- List of solved missing person cases (1950–1969)
