= The Coffin Affair =

- French: L'Affaire Coffin
- Directed by: Jean-Claude Labrecque
- Written by: Jean-Claude Labrecque; Jacques Benoit; Jacques Hébert
- Produced by: Robert Ménard
- Starring: August Schellenberg; Gabriel Arcand; Micheline Lanctôt; Roger Lebel
- Cinematography: Pierre Mignot
- Edited by: André Corriveau
- Music by: Anne Lauber
- Release date: September 10, 1980
- Running time: 107 minutes
- Country: Canada
- Language: French

The Coffin Affair (French: L'Affaire Coffin) is a Canadian drama film from Quebec, released in 1980. Directed by Jean-Claude Labrecque, the film is a dramatization of the Coffin affair of 1953.

The film stars August Schellenberg as Wilbert Coffin. The cast also includes Gabriel Arcand, Micheline Lanctôt, Roger Lebel, Aubert Pallascio, Yvon Dufour and Raymond Cloutier.

The film reignited the controversy over Coffin's conviction and execution. Jules Deschênes, the Quebec Superior Court judge who had presided over the 1964 inquiry into Coffin's conviction, publicly claimed that the filmmakers "twisted the facts to accommodate their personal convictions and thus present a slanderous portrait of the judicial system to the viewing public"; Jacques Hébert, the journalist who had initiated the original controversy with his 1963 book J'accuse les assassins de Coffin and had been a consultant on the film, responded with an open letter in La Presse in response to Deschênes' allegations.

== Critical response ==
The film received mostly favourable reviews, although Jay Scott criticized the English-language dubbing, saying that it sounded like it had been dubbed by news announcers: "August Schellenberg appears to give an extraordinary performance as the condemned Wilbert Coffin, but the quality of the film over all, thanks to disembodied Esperanto voices reading the script as if it were a speech by Ed Schreyer, is anyone's guess."

== Awards ==
The film garnered four Genie Award nominations at the 2nd Genie Awards in 1981:

- Best Actor: August Schellenberg
- Best Supporting Actress: Micheline Lanctôt
- Best Director: Jean-Claude Labrecque
- Best Original Screenplay: Jean-Claude Labrecque and Jacques Benoit.
