= Béliveau =

Béliveau, Beliveau or Belliveau is a French-Canadian surname found today in New Brunswick, Nova Scotia, and Québec in Canada. The name is also found throughout New England in the United States and elsewhere.

The name is thought to have been brought to North America before 1650 by Antoine Belliveau, who was among the first 50 French immigrant families to colonize Port Royal in l'Acadie (Acadia), present day Annapolis Royal, Nova Scotia, Canada, in unceded Mi'kmaq territory. Following Le Grand Dérangement (The Great Upheaval) of 1755, in which about 10,000 Acadians were imprisoned and deported by the British at the outset of the War of the Conquest (Seven Years' War), several Belliveau descendants settled in Québec, where the spellings Béliveau or Beliveau arose.

As of 2024, in Québec, Canada, Béliveau ranks as the 422nd most common French surname.

Notable people with the surname include:

- Antoine Belliveau (1621–aft.1686), First Belliveau to settle in North America from France
- Pierre (Piau) Belliveau (1706–1767), led more than 100 Acadians in escaping Le Grand Dérangement
- Alphée Belliveau (1851–1927), pioneering French-speaking Acadian teacher and school administrator
- John Edward Belliveau (1913–1998), Canadian writer and journalist
- Pierre E. Belliveau (1896–1966), Canadian politician in Nova Scotia
- Juliette Béliveau (1889–1975), French-Canadian actress and singer
- Jean Béliveau (1931–2014), Canadian ice hockey player
- Renée Belliveau, Canadian writer and archivist
- Sterling Belliveau (born 1953), Canadian politician in Nova Scotia
- Véronique Béliveau (born 1955), Canadian pop/rock singer and actress
- Eugene Belliveau (born 1958), Canadian football defensive tackle
- Cynthia Belliveau (born 1963), Canadian actress
- Jeff Beliveau (born 1987), American baseball pitcher

== See also ==
- Belliveau Cove, Nova Scotia, Acadian community
- Collège Béliveau, college in Western Canada
- Colisée Jean Béliveau, ice-hockey arena, named after Jean Béliveau
- Jean Béliveau Trophy, ice-hockey award, named after Jean Béliveau
