= Raymond Edmunds =

Australian rapist and murderer

- Born: 12 March 1944 (age 82); Melbourne, Victoria, Australia
- Convictions: Murder (2 counts); Rape (9 counts); Indecent assault (3 counts); Assault causing bodily harm (2 counts); False imprisonment Indecent exposure

Raymond Edmunds (born 12 March 1944 at Queen Victoria Hospital, Melbourne, Australia) is a convicted Australian serial rapist, double murderer, and suspected serial killer who was active in Victoria, Australia, from the 1960s to the mid-1980s, known as "Mr Stinky".

== Crimes ==
In 1986, Edmunds was convicted of the murder of 18-year-old panel beater Garry Heywood and the rape and murder of 16-year-old Abina Madill at Murchison East, near Shepparton, Victoria. On 10 February 1966, the two co-workers had attended a rock concert with their respective friends at the Shepparton Civic Centre, but neither returned home. A few days later, two 17-year-olds on a shooting trip found Madill's decomposed remains, and then Heywood's body was found 200 metres away. Heywood had been shot through the head with a .22-calibre Mossberg self-loading rifle; Madill had been raped and bludgeoned to death.

On 16 March 1985, Edmunds was arrested on unrelated charges of indecent exposure while parked in his station wagon in Albury, New South Wales. Edmunds pleaded guilty in Albury court to the charges, being fined $400 prior to his release. After his arrest Edmunds was fingerprinted and the prints were matched with those found at the Shepparton crime scene. At the time, New South Wales had mandatory fingerprinting, whereas in Victoria it had yet to become law. He was convicted and is now serving two life sentences with no minimum term for the murders and a total of 30 years for five rape convictions in Greensborough and Donvale.

It has been alleged that Edmunds committed other murders and more than 32 rapes, although he has maintained his innocence. Police sought to utilise new legislation that allows them to compel convicted prisoners to provide a blood sample for DNA testing. He was at one point a suspect in the case of missing Beaumaris girl Eloise Worledge.

In 2019, Edmunds had 23 years and five months added to his sentence after pleading guilty to four counts of rape, three of indecent assault, two of assault causing bodily harm and one of false imprisonment.
