= Miami Strangler =

Unidentified serial killer

Details
- Victims: 9–11
- Span of crimes: 1964–1970
- Country: United States
- State: Florida
- Date apprehended: Never apprehended

The Miami Strangler is the name attributed to an unidentified serial killer who murdered at least nine women in Miami, Florida, between 1964 and 1970. Despite the nickname, not all victims were strangled, and some died from bludgeoning and smothering. Although no victim was directly sexually assaulted, the murders appear sexually motivated given how the victims were posed. Investigators had a suspect in the case, a felon, but he was never charged in any of the crimes.

== Murders ==
On August 17, 1964, Mary E. McGreevy, 64, was smothered to death in her home with a pillow.

Six months later, at about 9:00 p.m. on March 8, 1965, 38-year-old Sylvia Valdez left her workplace, walked to the parking lot and discovered her car had a flat tire. At 10:30 p.m., a parking lot attendant changed the tire and saw Valdez speak with two Cuban men as he walked away. Valdez was found dead in her car the next morning. A black silk scarf was wrapped around her neck, and her skirt was pulled over her head. She was also shot twice behind the right ear with a .22 caliber pistol. Although her purse, shoes, and car keys were stolen, the perpetrator did not steal other valuable items such as her diamond ring. It was determined that Valdez had not been sexually assaulted.

In February 1966, 44-year-old Bernadita Gonzalez was last seen alive in a Miami beauty salon. Eight weeks later, a highway patrolman discovered her decomposing body floating face down in Levitz Lake. The medical examiner determined that she died from blunt-force trauma to the skull, possibly inflicted by a hatchet. The perpetrator took her underwear, but left her jewelry on her.

Sherivon Dolores Wooten, a 21-year-old woman, was the next victim. On August 16, 1969, her dead body was found on a dirt road between two homes. Like the previous victims, she was strangled to death, and her clothes were hiked over her breasts. There were also fingernail marks on her neck. Wooten was last seen leaving her house the night before her body was found.

On May 5, 1970, 64-year-old Mary Louise Clark Danford was found strangled to death in her home by worried friends who came to check on her after she stopped answering phone calls. Danford was found on her bed with her sweater pushed up and her underwear missing. She was last seen buying groceries a few hours earlier. The perpetrator entered the home through a small window.

The next victim was 64-year-old Ruth Boehner, whose body was discovered in her apartment on June 2, 1970. Her cause of death was blunt-force trauma to the head, neck, and jaw. Additionally, Boehner had been strangled, which caused her hyoid bone to break. Her nightgown was also pulled up, and her clothes were disheveled. There was no evidence of forced entry into the apartment.

On August 5, 1970, 84-year-old Mattie Ophelia Harris was strangled to death with a necktie in her kitchen. Her nightgown had also been pulled up, and her house was ransacked.

On October 10, 1970, 48-year-old deaf-mute woman Regina Bonnanno was found dead in her apartment. She was bound to her bed, and her bra and a scarf were tied around her neck. Panties were stuffed in her mouth, and her head was shoved inside of a pillowcase.

The final confirmed victim of the Miami Strangler was 36-year-old Patrice Finer Newkirk. On October 26, 1970, she was found bludgeoned to death in the trunk of her car. The damage to her skull was comparable to that from falling from a building. The perpetrator also tore off a piece of her dress and tied it around her neck. Newkirk's purse, car keys, shoes, and underwear were stolen as well.

=== Other suspected murders ===
Although the Miami Strangler was only conclusively linked to nine murders, he is also suspected of murdering Mary Francis Sims, a 31-year-old Miami housewife. Sims was found dead by her husband in their home in March 1971. She was sexually assaulted, strangled, and stabbed in the throat on her bed.

The perpetrator may also be responsible for the murder of Clara Jane Armaly, who was strangled to death in her home on September 12, 1971. On the afternoon before, she was last seen alive by her estranged husband, who came to pick up their children for a visit. Her husband found her body face down in her bedroom on the morning of September 13. There were no signs of forced entry into the house or of a struggle between Armaly and the perpetrator. Additionally, an electrical cord was found near her body, but it's unknown if the cord was used to strangle her. Armaly's husband went into a state of shock after finding her remains, and required sedation at the hospital. To date, no arrests have been made in Clara Armaly's murder.

== Investigation ==
Police linked the murders through their similarities. All but one of the victims were white; the crimes occurred in downtown Miami; the victims died from either strangulation, smothering, or bludgeoning; and the murders appeared sexually motivated. Investigators believed that the perpetrator was a sexual sadist with a fetish for attacking vulnerable women alone in their homes. However, the perpetrator's modus operandi was inconsistent, and he did not always exhibit the same behaviors in every murder.

Police questioned Calvin Jones Jr., a truck driver who had been recently released from prison following a conviction for his fourth felony. Jones was the parking lot attendant that changed Sylvia Valdez's tire and also knew Patrice Newkirk. However, Jones was never charged with any of the murders.

== See also ==
- Cold case
- Flat-Tire murders
- List of serial killers in the United States
