= Herman Schultheis =

German-American animator, photographer, and archeologist (1900–1955)

- Born: February 11, 1900; Aachen, Rhine Province, German Empire
- Disappeared: May 20, 1955 (aged 55) near Tikal, Guatemala
- Education: Ph.D. in mechanical and electrical engineering
- Occupation: Technician
- Employer: Walt Disney Studios
- Spouse: Ethel Wisloh (m. 1936)

Herman Schultheis (11 February 1900 – disappeared 21 May 1955) was a Walt Disney Studios photographer and technician in the Special Effects Department best known for his work on the feature films Fantasia, Pinocchio, Dumbo and Bambi.

== Career ==
Schultheis emigrated to New York City from his native Germany in 1927 working jobs in sound-recording. He married Ethel Wisloh in 1936, and the pair moved to Los Angeles in 1937. In February 1939, Schultheis joined The Walt Disney Company in the Special Effects department, at the old Hyperion Avenue Studios in Silver Lake, where he worked on a number of films, most notably on the animated features Fantasia and Pinocchio. He left Walt Disney in June 1940. In 1949, he started employment with Librascope as a patent engineer.

== Disappearance and recovery of remains ==
Schultheis was a dedicated amateur photographer and archeologist who traveled regularly to pursue his hobbies. In 1955 he traveled to Guatemala, where he was last seen on May 20. On that day he hired an airplane to fly him from Flores to a landing area in the vicinity of Tikal, where he intended to take photographs of the nearby ruins. Upon arriving at his destination, he arranged to be picked up three hours later for the return flight. Schultheis was last seen headed into a jungle area that was in the direction of the ruins. With no sign of him at the agreed upon departure time, the plane and crew left. They returned the next day, then the day after that, but still did not find him. Efforts by search parties on the ground and in the air failed to find him. Officials with the American Embassy in Guatemala reported in June 1955 that chances of finding Schultheis by that point, whether alive or dead, were "problematical." His remains were discovered on November 23, 1956, by a local chicle worker. Two cameras, a pair of rubber-soled shoes, and a bag with personal items were also recovered.

== Schultheis notebook ==
Schultheis documented advanced special effect techniques used in Disney films in a notebook titled Special Effects. It is on display at The Walt Disney Family Museum in San Francisco, California. His detailed notebook, documenting the special effects for Fantasia, is the subject of a 14-minute short-subject included on the film's DVD. The notebook, once offered to Disney for the sum of $400 in 1939 (equivalent to $9,042 in 2024), was discovered by Disney historian Howard Lowery hidden away in a Murphy bed in Schultheis's Los Angeles residence upon the death of his widow Ethel Schultheis death in the early 1990s.

John Canemaker's book, The Lost Notebook: Herman Schultheis and the Secrets of Walt Disney’s Movie Magic is a partial reproduction of the notebook. Canemaker called Schultheis' book "the Rosetta Stone of Disney animation."

== The Herman J. Schultheis Collection of International Photographs, 1927–1950 ==
The Schultheis Collection is composed of original photographic prints documenting Schultheis' various travels to the Mediterranean region, South America, the Caribbean, Mexico, and the eastern half of the United States, as well as many photos that document a wide swath of life in Southern California. Following the death of Ethel in 1990, conservators found a trove of thousands of photographs in the Schultheis home in Los Feliz, Los Angeles. The collection was deeded to the Los Angeles Public Library, and nearly 6,000 are available in their Digital Collections.

== See also ==
- List of solved missing person cases: 1950–1999
- List of unsolved deaths
