= Mack Ray Edwards =

American child molester and serial killer (1918–1971)

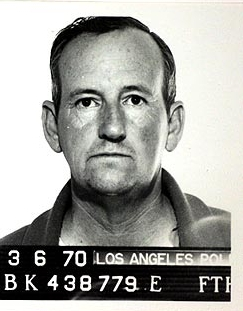
- Mugshot of Edwards in 1970
- Born: October 17, 1918; Montgomery County, Arkansas, U.S.
- Died: October 30, 1971 (aged 53); San Quentin State Prison, California, U.S.
- Known for: Being a child molester and serial killer
- Status: Deceased
- Convictions: First degree murder (3 counts); Kidnapping (3 counts)
- Penalty: Death

Details
- Victims: 6+
- Span of crimes: 1953–1970
- Country: United States
- State: California
- Weapon: .22 caliber handgun
- Date apprehended: March 6, 1970

Mack Ray Edwards (October 17, 1918 – October 30, 1971) was an American child molester and serial killer who molested and murdered at least six children in Los Angeles County, California, between 1953 and 1970. Sentenced to death, he hanged himself in his prison cell.

== Biography ==
=== Early years ===
Edwards was born in Montgomery County, Arkansas, on October 17, 1918, and moved to Los Angeles County, California, in 1941. The year following his arrival in Los Angeles County he joined the United States Army Corps of Engineers and, trained in the use of heavy equipment, served as a combat engineer. He married Mary Howell in 1946. Between 1950 and 1957, Edwards resided in the cities of Pico Rivera, El Monte and Azusa in Los Angeles County. He kept horses and allowed neighborhood youths to ride them. He also took local children camping.

In the 1950s, Edwards joined the International Union of Operating Engineers (IUOE). As a heavy equipment operator contracted by the California Department of Transportation (Caltrans) and other agencies, he worked on freeway construction sites in the 1950s and 1960s, driving backhoes and other equipment. In the 1960s, Edwards moved to Ralston Avenue in Sylmar, Los Angeles, in the northern San Fernando Valley with his wife and two children, both adopted.

=== Criminal acts and suicide ===
Edwards sexually molested and murdered three children from 1953 to 1956; he molested and murdered three more in 1968 and 1969. He later stated that all of his crimes were motivated by a desire for sex. The body of one of Edwards's victims was found underneath the Santa Ana Freeway, and he claimed to have disposed of others under the Ventura Freeway.

In 1970, Edwards and an unnamed 15-year-old male accomplice entered the home of Edgar Cohen of Sylmar, Los Angeles, where they kidnapped three sisters – Valerie, Cindy, and Jan Cohen who were 12, 13, and 14 years old, respectively – from their address at 15768 Roxford Avenue. They were former neighbors of his. After forcing the girls to write a note to their parents saying that they were running away from home, Edwards and his accomplice then took them by car to remote Bouquet Canyon in the Angeles National Forest north of Newhall, California. When two of the girls escaped, Edwards released the third and – knowing they could identify him – walked into a San Fernando Valley police station on March 6, 1970, and surrendered to Los Angeles Police Department (LAPD) Foothill Division detectives. He handed them a loaded handgun, told them that he had planned to molest and kill the three girls, and confessed to having murdered six other children.

In his confession, he told Sergeant George Rock how his conscience bothered him. As officers placed him in handcuffs, Edwards lamented how he was unable to eat or sleep: "I have a guilt complex. I couldn't eat and I couldn't sleep, and it was beginning to affect my work. You know I'm a heavy equipment operator. That long grader I'm using now costs a lot of money—$200,000. I might wreck it or turn it over and hurt someone." Regarding the Cohen sisters, he gave the following statement: "I'm glad they got away because [otherwise] it would have been nine [murders] instead of six."

After three bodies were recovered, Edwards pleaded guilty in Van Nuys Superior Court to three counts of kidnapping and three counts of murder. During a preliminary hearing on March 17, 1970, Edwards tried to plead guilty, but the judge refused to accept the plea. "Guilty. I am guilty!", Edwards insisted. His lawyer asked that he could submit an innocent plea on Edwards's behalf. "I don't need a lawyer! I am guilty!", Edwards maintained. The judge scheduled Edwards's trial for May 6 but it was delayed by Edwards's multiple suicide attempts; while in prison awaiting trial, Edwards twice attempted suicide, first on March 30 by slashing his stomach with a razor blade, and then again on May 7 by taking an overdose of tranquilizers. Edwards's trial resumed on May 17, 1971.

Deputy District Attorney David Kenner instructed the jury, "If ever there was a case that cried out for the imposition of the death penalty, this is the case. This defendant has forfeited whatever right a person has to live in this society." Edwards agreed and requested the death penalty, indicating that he wanted to pay the ultimate price for his crimes and that he was willing to trade places with the next man in line for the gas chamber. "My attorney got a bit mixed up and pleaded for my life," said the confessed killer. "I want the chair. That's what I've always wanted. I told them that when I went into the police station, [but] they didn't say that in court. This was sadistic, to bring these parents and other witnesses down here and put them through this [trial]!" Sentencing was scheduled for June 5 of the same year. He was sentenced to death in a gas chamber. He was transferred to San Quentin State Prison on June 11, 1970, where he occupied a cell next to an inmate who neighbored Charles Manson on the other side. On October 30, 1971, Edwards killed himself by hanging using an electrical television cord in his cell in San Quentin State Prison.

== Victims ==
=== Known victims ===
Edwards was convicted of murdering three children:

- Stella Darlene Nolan, 8, who disappeared while at a refreshment stand at a flea market in Norwalk, on June 20, 1953. Edwards confessed to kidnapping her, taking her to his then-home in Azusa, then raping her before he then drove her to the Angeles Forest and manually strangled the child before throwing her tiny body over a bridge. The next day, Mack returned to the crime scene and was surprised to find Stella alive, around 100 yards from where he left her, and sitting up but unable to move or speak. Mack took out his pocket knife and stabbed her to death. In March 1970, Edwards brought the police to her skeletal remains, buried eight feet under an embankment near a Santa Ana Freeway abutment in Downey.
- Gary Rochet, 16, who was found shot to death at his home on November 26, 1968. Edwards said he shot him after breaking into the boy's Sylmar home, seeking to kidnap his 13-year-old sister; she was not at home.
- Donald Allen Todd, 13, of Pacoima, California, who disappeared May 16, 1969, after leaving school. He and another boy had been suspended for fighting and sent home; he was never seen alive again. His body was found that year by two children below a bridge just a mile and a half from his home; he had been sexually abused and shot with a .22 caliber handgun.

Edwards confessed to three additional killings. Because their bodies were not recovered, he was not charged with these murders:

- Donald Lee Baker, 13, and Brenda Jo Howell, 11, rode their bicycles to the San Gabriel Canyon area near Glendora Mountain Road and disappeared on August 6, 1956. A few days later, Donald's jacket and Brenda's bicycle were found near Morris Dam, a quarter of a mile south of where they were last seen. Donald's bicycle was located a month later. Neither of the children have been heard from again. Authorities initially believed the children had run away from home, but later Edwards directed investigators to a site where he said he had disposed of their bodies, but a search of the area turned up no signs of any remains. Brenda was his sister-in-law and Donald was one of his neighbors. In his confession, Edwards claimed that he had paid Baker $7 to procure Howell by convincing her to go on a bike ride with him. Edwards followed in a pickup truck. Once they were in a secluded area, he separated the two of them and slit both of their throats.
- Roger Dale Madison, 15, was last seen leaving his home in the 14500 block of Sayre Street in Sylmar, California on December 16, 1968. He had an argument with his father about smoking and rode away from his house on his motorcycle. Roger never returned home and has never been heard from again. His family initially believed he had run away from home; Edwards had a social relationship with Madison's family and was trusted by Madison, who was friends with and a classmate of Edwards' son. Edwards lived just five houses down the street from Roger's home and was a regular visitor there. Edwards stated he lured Roger into an orange grove and tricked him into agreeing to be tied up as part of a game. Edwards said he then stabbed him to death and buried his body with a bulldozer in a compaction hole under California State Route 23 in Thousand Oaks, which was under construction and Edwards was working at the site. In 2008, a search conducted by units from the LAPD and the Ventura County Sheriff's Department, assisted by a special unit of the FBI, sought to find Madison's remains focused on a spot along a southbound off-ramp at the Tierra Rejada Road exit on Route 23 that Edwards had helped build. Four cadaver dogs noted the presence of human remains. The search proved to be unsuccessful.

=== Possible victims ===
Edwards may have committed other murders, but his own account was inconsistent. Before he was transferred to San Quentin State Prison, he claimed to both a Los Angeles County jail guard and another inmate that he had killed between eighteen and twenty-two children. However, when questioned by the court, Edwards reversed himself, "Six is all there is…just six." In addition, in a 1970 interview with the Los Angeles Times, Edwards further reaffirmed that the number of victims was only six. Edwards told the guard that he refused to repeat his jailhouse confession about the other killings to the police at the time because the authorities had disparaged him and said "bad things about me in court." The twelve-year interval between the disappearance of Baker and Howell and the shooting of Rochet has led investigators to suspect Edwards may have committed similar crimes during that time. Edwards is considered a suspect in the following disappearances and murders:

- As of March 2007, the LAPD was investigating the possibility of Edwards' involvement in the disappearance of 8-year old Thomas Eldon "Tommy" Bowman, who was last seen on March 23, 1957, while hiking along the Arroyo Seco near Altadena. Bowman had been walking with his parents, cousins, and other family members, before telling them he was running ahead to the car. Bowman's family let him race off, but when they arrived at the car park, the boy was nowhere to be seen. An extensive search produced no trace of him, but two women reported seeing a crying boy matching Bowman's description, with a "deeply tanned" man not far behind. In researching the case, author G. Weston DeWalt noted similarities between a photo of Edwards and a sketch of the man seen near the boy believed to be Tommy Bowman. DeWalt was later shown a letter Edwards had written to his wife before his suicide, in which he in-effect implicated himself in Bowman's disappearance: "I was going to add one more[to the confession], and that was the Tommy Bowman boy that disappeared in Pasadena, but I felt I would really make a mess of that one. So I left him out of it." DeWalt also found that Edwards' employer, Kirst Construction, kept an equipment yard less than half a mile from where Tommy Bowman was last seen. Bowman's body has never been found.
- Bruce Kremen, 6, was last seen near Buckhorn Flat in the Angeles National Forest on July 12, 1960, while camping with a group of approximately 80 children and adults from the Los Angeles branch of the YMCA. Bruce was playing with two other children about 300 yards from the YMCA campsite, when he became separated from his playmates and was never seen again. Quickly realising that Bruce was missing, the YMCA group conducted a search of the area, but found no sign of him. Authorities initially believed Bruce had become lost or injured in the mountains, and a massive search was conducted in the days following his disappearance. The area where he disappeared is very rugged with many chasms and cliffs, making an accident seem likely to searchers. However, authorities now believe Bruce may have been another of Edwards' victims.
- Karen Lynn Tompkins, 11, was last seen on August 18, 1961, in Torrance, California. She and her eight-year-old brother were attending a summer arts and crafts class at Halldale Avenue Elementary School at 215th Street and Halldale Avenue in Harbor Gateway, just east of the Torrance city limit. That day, their dog followed them to the class so Karen's brother took it home before the class was over. Karen stayed behind. The teacher and other students saw Karen leave the class when it ended at 5:30 p.m. that day. She was carrying two toy covered wagons, the crafts she and her brother had made in the class. It was a four-block walk between the school and Karen's home, and a classmate rode with her on a bicycle for the first few minutes of the trip. The police were called when she did not arrive home by 6:00 p.m.
- Dorothy Gale Brown, 11, disappeared on July 2, 1962, while riding her bike to a car wash near her home in Torrance, California to purchase sodas from a vending machine. About 8:30 p.m., her father found her bike parked on its kick stand on 21st Street near Border Avenue, one block from her trailer home, and called police. The next morning, her white dress was discovered stuffed in a beer can on Tin Can Beach by a 12-year-old girl who took it home. Her mother laundered it but turned it in to police when the story was made public. About noon that day, her unclothed body was discovered by two recreational skin divers floating in 25 feet of water in a kelp bed about 150 yards off shore, near Corona del Mar, Newport Beach. She had been in the water for between six and eight hours. Her pink plastic hair band was found by police also stuffed into a beer can on Tin Can Beach. Police theorised that Gale had known her abductor and that she may have been taken by boat to the location where she was discovered because the currents in that location would have taken her body toward the shore. She had been molested and drowned. Investigators at the time believed the Tompkins and Brown cases were related. Both girls were the same age, both were blonde, and both disappeared at around the same time of day and from only blocks apart. Brown's murder has never been solved.
- Ramona Price, 7, was last seen in her hometown of Santa Barbara, California at 11:00 a.m. on September 2, 1961. Her family was in the process of moving, and she told her father she was going to walk from their Oak Avenue home to their new house. She has never been heard from again. Dogs later tracked her scent for close to two miles down Modoc Road near the 101 Freeway overpass at Winchester Canyon Road, which was under construction at the time. A witness described a girl matching Price's description as getting into a faded blue 1953 or 1954 Plymouth automobile; Edwards was known to drive Plymouths, and a sketch of the car's driver shows a man matching his description. On June 15, 2011, the Santa Barbara Police Department announced plans to search for Price's remains in an area near a 101 Freeway overpass that was under renovation at the time of her disappearance. The police did not announce at the time what evidence led them to believe her remains may be buried there, but local news reports suggested a possible link to Edwards, who was working at the location. The following day, four teams of cadaver dogs had alerted on the same "area of interest" at the site, but a decision was not made about whether to undertake further excavation. The search did not lead to the discovery of her remains.

== See also ==
- List of serial killers in the United States
