= Coffin affair =

Event in Canadian history

- Date: June 1953; 73 years ago
- Location: Gaspésie, Canada
- Deaths: 4, including Wilbert Coffin

The Coffin affair was an event in Canadian history in which a man named Wilbert Coffin was hanged for the murder of three men. The affair started in June 1953 in Gaspésie when three men from Pennsylvania were reported missing. Their bodies were found a month later deep in the woods 60 km (37 mi) from the nearest town.

== Trial and execution ==
The main suspect in the case was Wilbert Coffin, who was found to have many items belonging to the men in his possession. Coffin was sent to trial in July 1954 and though the evidence against him was mostly circumstantial, he was convicted of one count of murder (as the penal code prohibited multiple convictions of murder in the same trial). On August 5 he was sentenced to hang.

An appeal to the Quebec Court of Queen's Bench was dismissed. Coffin's application for leave to appeal to the Supreme Court of Canada was turned down but the federal Cabinet submitted a reference question to that Court asking: "If the application made by Wilbert Coffin for leave to appeal to the Supreme Court of Canada had been granted on any of the grounds alleged on the said application, what disposition of the appeal would now be made by the court?"

The federal government's decision to take the question to the Supreme Court of Canada caused tension with the government of the province of Quebec. The Supreme Court answered that it would have upheld the conviction of Coffin: Reference re Regina v. Coffin, [1956] S.C.R. 191.

Coffin was hanged at Montreal's Bordeaux Prison on February 2, 1956 at 12:01 AM.

But the story did not end with Coffin's death. Jacques Hébert, a reporter during the trial and later a senator, published two books on the matter: Coffin était innocent (1958) and J'accuse les assassins de Coffin (1963). Hébert's 1963 book caused such controversy that the provincial government established a Commission of Inquiry into the case. Headed by judge Roger Brossard with Jules Deschênes as Counsel to the Commission, over 200 witnesses were interviewed. The commission found that Coffin did receive a fair trial.

In 1979, filmmaker Jean-Claude Labrecque made a feature film on the matter entitled L'Affaire Coffin. It was released on September 10, 1980. Other documents inspired by the Coffin case include Dale Boyle's song "The Wilbert Coffin Story" and the Alton Price book, To Build A Noose, which reflects Price's intensive research on the case.

== Recent interest and debate ==
In 2006, 50 years after Coffin's hanging, four generations of his family commemorated his death at his graveside. That week, the Association in Defence of the Wrongly Convicted announced it was studying the case. The director of client services for the association called Coffin's case "a blot on the criminal justice system."

The coroner at the time, Lionel Rioux, told the news media that he believes Coffin was innocent. Rioux accused Maurice Duplessis, premier of Quebec at the time, of making Coffin into a scapegoat for the killings of foreign tourists. Rioux held a coroner's inquest at which Coffin testified. Rioux says that the provincial government destroyed the transcript of Coffin's testimony. Coffin did not testify at his trial. Speaking in 2006, prominent Canadian criminal lawyer Edward Greenspan blamed Coffin's trial lawyer, Raymond Maher who suffered from alcoholism and was drunk for the majority of the trial, for keeping Coffin out of the witness box: "It was incompetence with a capital I," Greenspan said of Maher. "It's the worst case of lawyering I've ever seen." Investigators also had a picture of Coffin with a noose drawn onto his neck on the wall.

At the time Coffin was hanged, he had an 8-year-old son. The child's mother wanted to marry Coffin before the execution, but Duplessis denied permission and said it would not be "decent."

In a 384-page book titled L'affaire Coffin: Une supercherie? (translation: The Coffin Affair: A Frame-Up?) published by Wilson & Lafleur in Montreal, Clément Fortin, a retired attorney and law professor, proceeded to re-establish the facts. Given the evidence presented to the Percé jurors in 1954, Fortin concluded that they were justified to render a verdict of guilty as charged. In 1964, the Royal Commission of Enquiry on the Coffin Affair reached the same conclusion.

== See also ==
- List of solved missing person cases (1950–1969)
