= Robison family murders =

Inactive 1968 mass murder of six people in Michigan

- Family portrait of Richard and Shirley Robison and their four children
- Location: 45°34′02″N 85°06′48″W; Good Hart, Readmond Township, Michigan, U.S.
- Date: June 25, 1968; 58 years ago
- Attack type: Mass shooting, mass murder
- Weapons: .22-caliber AR-7 semi-automatic rifle; .25-caliber Beretta 950 Jetfire semi-automatic pistol; Claw hammer
- Deaths: 6
- Victim: Robison family
- Perpetrator: Joseph Raymond Scolaro III (alleged)
- Motive: Unknown. Possible concealment of alleged perpetrator's embezzlement from his employer.
- Charges: Unattributable due to suicide of prime suspect

The Robison family murders (also known as the Good Hart murders) are an unsolved mass murder which occurred in the secluded resort area of Good Hart, Michigan, on June 25, 1968. The victims were a vacationing upper-middle-class family from Lathrup Village who were shot and killed inside their Lake Michigan holiday cottage, with two decedents also bludgeoned with a hammer prior to death. Their bodies remained undiscovered until July 22.

Following an exhaustive investigation by the Michigan State Police and the Emmet County Sheriff's Office, initial investigations were completed in December 1969, with ample circumstantial evidence indicating the perpetrator was a senior employee of Richard Robison's named Joseph Raymond Scolaro III, who had engaged in embezzlement which his employer is known to have discovered and begun investigating shortly before his murder.

Emmett County prosecutors initially determined insufficient evidence existed to successfully prosecute Scolaro, who committed suicide in March 1973 at age 34—reportedly upon hearing of his likely impending indictment for the murders following the reopening of the case and discovery of further physical evidence attesting to his guilt. He remains the sole and prime suspect in the murders.

At the time of their commission and discovery, the Robison family murders were considered the worst case of mass murder in Michigan history. Officially, the case remains open.

== Robison family ==
Richard Carl Robison was born in Wayne County, Michigan, in November 1925. He had met his fiancée, Shirley Fulton, in the mid-1940s while both attended college. The couple wed in 1947 and had four children: Richard Jr. (b. 1948); Gary (b. 1951); Randall (b. 1955); and Susan (b. 1960).

Robison had founded and operated a small advertisement agency named R. C. Robison & Associates in the mid-1950s. The firm strategized advertisement campaigns for businesses within the Detroit region; he also worked as a commercial artist, executive and publisher for Impresario magazine, which focused on cultural issues such as the arts, theatricals and music and was also based within his one-story Southfield office. The markedly wealthy family owned a private Learjet, and lived in the affluent Detroit suburb of Lathrup Village. (Note: An October 1967 insurance analysis of the two firms managed by Richard Robison placed a combined value of the two firms at over $600,000 (the equivalent of at least $5,820,000 as of 2026).)

By 1968, Richard Jr. attended Eastern Michigan University, Gary was a student at Southfield-Lathrup High School, Randall was a middle school student, and Susan—described as a "pony mad" child—a first grade student. The family regularly attended church services, and neither parent drank, smoked or gambled.

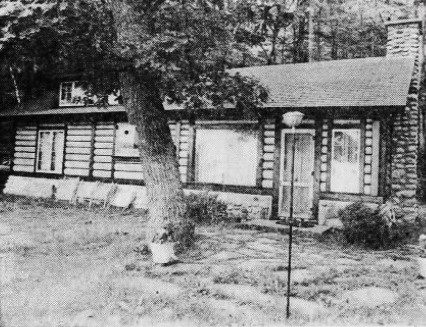
Summerset Cottage, seen here in 1968

=== Vacation ===
In the summer of 1968, the Robisons embarked on their annual vacation to the Blisswood Resort community within the small town of Good Hart. The family planned to spend three weeks of their vacation at Summerset, the seasonal log-and-stone holiday cottage they had purchased in the 1950s for $15,000. The five-room cottage itself was situated at the end of a long private driveway within a heavily-wooded area and which at one section runs alongside a 100-foot bluff close to the Lake Michigan shoreline. The family had visited the property every summer since 1957.

The vacation began on Sunday, June 16, with the family traveling in two cars to the destination. They were accompanied by several traveling companions, who would stay in their own rented holiday homes. These individuals included friends of the Robison boys, some business acquaintances, and personal friends of Richard Sr. and Shirley. Among those to know about the vacation and the location of the Robisons' secluded holiday home were several senior employees of Impresario magazine.

On June 23, one of the Robisons' traveling companions, 18-year-old Norman James Bliss (the son of the caretaker of Blisswood Resort and a close friend of Richard Jr.), was killed in a motorcycling accident while returning to Good Hart from nearby Cross Village, reportedly while intoxicated. An autopsy revealed his cause of death to be cerebral hemorrhage. The accident occurred sometime after 1:30 a.m., and the Robison family did not learn of the accident until that evening. Upon receipt of this news, Richard Sr. paid personal condolences to Bliss's parents at their Good Hart holiday home, offering to pay for the teenager's grave marker and flowers or a wreath. He also explained the family would be unable to attend the funeral as they were due to fly from Pellston Regional Airport to Kentucky, then Florida, with view to purchasing real estate and would "not be back [to their cottage] for a couple of weeks." He added the earliest date they would likely return would be July 15.

=== June 25, 1968 ===
On the morning of June 25, Richard Robison Sr. telephoned his personal banker at the National Bank of Detroit, Frank Joity, to discuss business pertaining to an expected recent deposit to his account of $200,000, only to be informed that the deposit had not been made, of financial irregularities within his business account within recent weeks, and that his current business balance was just $15,000. (Note: A subsequent investigation into the finances of Robison's businesses was unable to trace the whereabouts of over $60,000 from the company accounts.) These revelations infuriated Robison, who telephoned his receptionist, demanding to speak to a senior employee of his named Joseph Scolaro III—the only employee of his with direct access to company accounts—to seek an explanation as to the missing funds. Investigators later determined this phone call had been made shortly after 10:30 a.m. Telephone records would later determine that over the following hours, Robison Sr. both called and attempted to call Scolaro on seventeen occasions, demanding an explanation.

Due to the conversation Robison Sr. had with the caretaker of Blisswood Resort the previous evening pertaining to impending travel plans, neither the Robisons' travel companions nor the caretakers of the resort became suspicious when the family were not seen for several weeks despite the fact the family's Ford LTD station wagon plus their rented Chrysler Newport remained parked close to the cottage. This was in part due to the fact that, in previous years, the family had largely, though not exclusively, kept to themselves during their vacations at the resort.

The final confirmed sighting of the Robisons occurred at approximately 4:30 p.m. on June 25, when two individuals tasked to trim trees within the grounds of Summerset left the property.

== Murders ==
Investigators would later determine the most likely time the Robison family were murdered was in the early evening of June 25, 1968. The murders evidently began when the assailant was outside the property, as five .22-caliber semi-automatic rifle gunshots were fired through a rear window of Summerset Cottage at Richard Robison Sr. as he sat in a chair. (Note: The official investigation into the murders would conclude the Robisons' youngest son, Randall, had been shot and killed alongside his father in this initial salvo before the assailant entered Summerset Cottage.) The perpetrator then entered the cottage through an unlocked door and killed the remaining five family members—Shirley (40), Richard Jr. (19), Gary (16), Randall (12), and Susan (7)—with shots to the head and body from both the rifle and a .25-caliber semi-automatic pistol. Most likely, the final two family members killed were Richard Jr. and Gary, who were likely shot as they attempted to retrieve a rifle the family stored in a closet in the rear bedroom. Susan and Richard Sr. were also bludgeoned with a claw hammer found at the murder scene, although there were few signs of a struggle within the cottage.

A single bloody footprint on the floor would lead investigators to conclude that one person had committed the murders, and this individual had most likely closed all the curtains to the cottage and crudely attempted to cover the bullet holes in the window from his initial salvo with a piece of cardboard before turning on the heating within the property, then locking the door to the premises before leaving the scene. Fifteen spent shell casings—eleven .22-caliber and four .25-caliber—were left at the premises. A note penned upon a section of paper towel affixed to the cottage door read 'Be back by 7-10. Robison.'

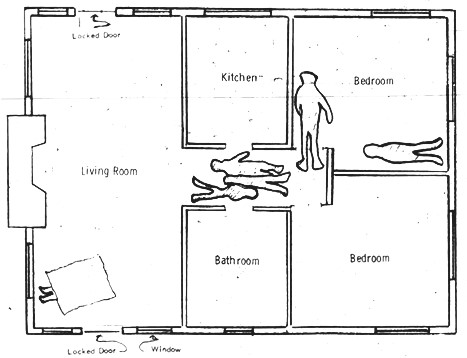
Illustration of the crime scene discovered within Summerset Cottage on July 22

=== Discovery ===
The bodies of the Robison family remained undiscovered until July 22. Their bodies were found by the owner and caretaker of the resort, Chauncey Bliss, following a complaint from a neighbor of the family of a pungent odor emanating from the cottage she had noted while playing a card game with friends on the grounds of her own property some 150 feet (46 m) from the Robison cottage that afternoon. Bliss found both doors to the property locked; he pried open the molding to gain entry to the cottage only to discover the crime scene. Bliss immediately notified authorities. (Note: Bliss had noted a strong odor emanating from the Robison cottage earlier in July; he had checked the grounds of the premises to see if the odor sourced from a dead mammal. Although Bliss observed the note affixed to the cottage door and the bullet holes in the glass panes on this occasion, he had assumed they had been caused by the Robison boys' pellet guns.)

Investigators would determine Richard Sr. had been shot in the chest with a .22-caliber firearm and once in the head with a .25-caliber pistol. He had also received a skull fracture; his body lay in the hallway to the property beneath the body of his youngest son, Randall, who had been shot once in the head by a firearm of unknown caliber. Susan lay alongside her father and brother; she had received a single .25-caliber gunshot to the face in addition to a skull fracture.

Shirley Robison's body lay on her stomach in the living room; she had received a single .25-caliber gunshot wound to the head and a red-and-black plaid blanket had been placed over her body after death. Richard Jr. lay midway between the hallway and northwest bedroom of the property; he had received several gunshots to the head from a .25-caliber pistol. Gary was discovered lying parallel to the east wall of the northwest bedroom; he had been shot once in the back with a .22-caliber firearm and twice in the head with a .25-caliber firearm. A ballistics examination of the bullets determined the .25-caliber firearm used in the murders was an automatic Beretta pistol, whereas the .22-caliber bullets had been fired from a somewhat uncommon AR-7 ArmaLite semi-automatic rifle. Playing cards scattered upon a table indicated two or more family members had been playing a game of solitaire at the time of the shootings.

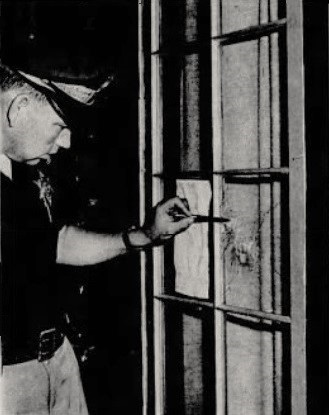
An Emmet County undersheriff examines bullet holes in the windows of Summerset Cottage. July 22, 1968.

The time-lapse between the homicides and their discovery in addition to the perpetrator having turned the heating on within the property had resulted in the decedents' bodies being in an advanced state of decomposition, thus destroying potential physical evidence. Questioning of the sole family whose seasonal home had been close to the Robison cottage revealed they had not been present in their cabin on June 24 or 25; however, another couple informed investigators that sometime in the late afternoon of June 25, they had heard two men and a woman shouting, followed by the sound of gunfire—all emanating from the direction of Summerset. They had chosen not to investigate, believing the Robisons to be "shooting gulls on the beach."

== Initial investigation ==
Investigators rapidly determined the murders were premeditated and most likely committed by an individual or individuals known to one or more members of the family. Although an expensive ring belonging to Shirley was missing, no money or other items of value had been taken from the victims, thus discounting robbery as a motive. Furthermore, although Shirley Robison was nude from the waist down, no family member had been sexually assaulted, and her body had most likely been posed in this manner to deceive investigators into believing a sexual motive existed behind the murders.

All individuals whom the Robisons were known to have encountered in the nine days they had spent at Good Hart were eliminated from the inquiry, and theories pertaining to potential family links to organized crime circles were also discounted. (Note: The Robison family murders were the first homicides to occur in Emmet County in nine years.)

=== Prime suspect ===
By the second week of the investigation, the Michigan State Police and the Emmet County authorities strongly suspected that one of Richard Robison's senior employees, 30-year-old Joseph Raymond Scolaro III, had been the perpetrator. Scolaro was a veteran of the United States Army Security Agency and a graduate of Harvard University; he had worked for Robison's advertising and publishing companies since December 1965, and held a senior position within his publishing firm. He had been left in temporary charge of both businesses by Richard Robison shortly prior to the family vacation, and was known to have visited Summerset Cottage on at least one occasion prior to the murders.

Scolaro admitted to having repeatedly conversed with his boss via telephone on the date of the murders in conversations he claimed revolved around an inquiry from Richard Sr. whether outstanding company checks had arrived at his office, but claimed to have heard nothing further from his employer. He expressed disbelief when confronted as to the vast missing funds from the company accounts—insisting only Robison and the company accountant dealt with company finances. Nonetheless, Robison's receptionist, Glenda Sutherland, informed investigators Scolaro had abruptly left his office shortly after receiving the first phone call from his employer, and subsequent inquiries revealed he had not been seen or heard from by his family, friends or colleagues between 10:30 a.m. and 11 p.m. on the day of the murders, when he returned to his Birmingham home. His alibis for this crucial time period were also quickly disproven. Moreover, a pair of boots owned by Scolaro were a precise match for the footprint discovered in the Robison cottage, although this pair of boots had evidently never been worn. (Note: Investigators would later learn Scolaro had habitually purchased "two of everything" as a reassurance measure in case he needed to replenish necessities and that he had likely disposed of the footwear he had used at the time of the murders to destroy physical evidence.)

Subsequent inspections of company financial records revealed that in the weeks prior to the murders, Scolaro had authorized a significant increase in his salary and expenses without his employer's knowledge. In addition, his handwriting on recent pre-signed checks from his employer revealed evident fraudulent activity. Investigators also discovered he owned two .22-caliber semi-automatic rifles, and that he had also purchased two .25-caliber pistols determined by investigators to have been of the model and caliber used in the murders in February 1968. When confronted with these facts, Scolaro claimed to have given one of the pistols to his employer and both rifles—which he claimed to have bought from his brother-in-law—to other individuals several months prior to the murders. One of the rifles was traced to an acquaintance of Scolaro's in Chicago. Although this rifle was of the model and caliber used in the murders, ballistics testing revealed the firearm had not been the one used by the perpetrator. The other rifle—which Scolaro claimed to have given to a relative—could not be traced.

During the course of the investigation, Scolaro undertook two polygraph tests—both of which he failed. The results of a third test were judged inconclusive. Experts also noted that Scolaro's answers were indicative of his attempting to deceive the interviewers in his pre-test interviews.

=== Further evidence ===
A November 1969 examination of a private Union Lake firing range owned by Scolaro's father-in-law produced several shell casings forensically proven by the Michigan State Police Crime Laboratory to source from the AR-7 firearm used in the Robison murders; (Note: Investigators searched this firing range for expended shell casings after being informed by Scolaro's brother-in-law that the two had fired an AR-7 rifle belonging to Scolaro at this shooting range sometime in the spring or summer of 1967.) this revelation was considered conclusive evidence of Scolaro's guilt to the two investigating police agencies. In addition, although the firearm was still missing, a neighbor informed police he had seen a .22-caliber AR-7 rifle in Scolaro's home shortly before the Robison murders.

Scolaro's .25-caliber Beretta pistol, which he had given to police to undergo forensic testing two days after the discovery of the crime scene, was forensically proven to have been of the make and model as the second firearm used in the homicides. Although the actual pistol used could not be traced, Scolaro's wife, Lora Lee, confirmed to investigators she had been with her husband at the Birmingham Gun Club when he had purchased two firearms of this caliber on February 2, 1968.

Several spent Sako .25-caliber cartridges had been recovered from the crime scene; this was a rare Finnish brand sold only for a limited time in Michigan in January and February, 1968. Investigators determined that one of the actual few individuals to have purchased this brand of ammunition in Michigan had been Joseph Scolaro, and that he had bought this ammunition on the same day he had purchased the .25-caliber pistols.

Scolaro's statements that he had given away both the weapons and the brand of ammunition used in the commission of the murders prior to the event were viewed by investigators as obvious attempts to deflect suspicion from himself and by late 1969, investigators believed they had amassed sufficient evidence to secure a warrant for his arrest.

== Dismissal of findings ==
Investigators presented their 700-page case report to the jurisdictional prosecution on December 17, 1969. This detailed report implicated Joseph Scolaro as the sole perpetrator of the crime, with ample circumstantial evidence attesting to his guilt and concluding he had the means, motive and opportunity to commit the crime.

The following month, Emmet County prosecutor Donald C. Noggle and Attorney General Frank Kelley ruled that insufficient evidence existed to bring formal charges against Scolaro, referencing the fact that although the spent shell casings recovered from the private firing range matched those used in the murders, the two firearms used in the commission of the murders had not been recovered. The ruling also noted no other form of physical evidence such as fingerprints placed Scolaro at the actual crime scene. As such, he was not charged with the murders, although investigators remained convinced of his guilt.

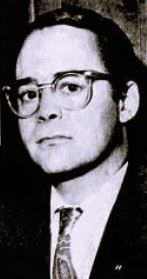
Scolaro, c. 1971

=== Intervening developments ===
Within four months of the Robisons' murder, Scolaro assumed directorship of R.C. Robison & Associates and Impresario magazine, having purchased the firms from the Robisons' estate. Scolaro managed both firms from Richard Sr.'s office. He would later sell the magazine, and also founded another firm he named Dimensional Research Inc.

Upon orders of the National Bank of Detroit, executors of the Robison estate, Summerset Cottage was demolished in the spring of 1969 due to an executive ruling the building was no longer habitable.

== Reopening of investigation ==
Four years after the commission of the murders, a newly elected chief prosecutor in Oakland County, Lewis Brooks Patterson—believing the Robison murders had been committed within his jurisdiction—formally reopened the prosecution. Upon reviewing the accrued evidence, Patterson informed Oakland County Assistant Prosecutor Ronald Covault: "We are going to charge [Scolaro] with murder."

The decision to reopen the case was widely publicized in Michigan. Upon discovering the reason Emmett County prosecutors had determined insufficient evidence existed to successfully prosecute Scolaro was a lack of physical evidence to confirm his guilt, investigators sought to retrieve further evidence sufficient to secure his arrest and prosecution.

=== Suicide of prime suspect ===
When Scolaro learned of his likely impending indictment resulting from this reopened investigation, he committed suicide by shooting himself in the head in his Southfield office on March 8, 1973. His body was discovered slumped in his high-back chair at 3:30 p.m. that afternoon by two men who entered his office looking to collect an outstanding $730 debt. Two typewritten suicide notes were found at the scene. One note was attached to the door of his office and addressed to his mother, warning her not to enter the office where his body lay; the other—also addressed to his mother—acknowledged the acts of fraud and forgery he had committed in life but ended with a handwritten denial of culpability for the murder of the Robison family.

The note Scolaro left in which he maintained his innocence of the Robison murders stated: "Mother, Where do I start ... I am a [liar]—cheat—phony. Any check that any of the people have with your signature isn't any good, because I forged your name to it to get them off my back. I owe everybody you can think of. I have made poor investments, and in some cases, no investments at all. ... I love you dearly, but living only causes you more heartache. I just can't help myself. Please understand. Love, Joe." The letter also listed several individuals whom he had defrauded in multiple business schemes.

At the base of this letter, Scolaro had penned a denial of culpability for the Robison family murders. This read:

P.S. I had nothing to do with the Robisons. I'm a cheat but not a murderer. Joe.

== Legal ramifications ==
Scolaro's suicide resulted in the investigation into the Robison murders becoming largely inactive. He remains the prime suspect in the murders, with past and present investigators convinced that, had he not committed suicide, he would have been tried and convicted of six counts of first-degree murder.

== Aftermath ==
The Robison family were laid to rest in Oakland County, Michigan, on July 26, 1968. Their interments within Acacia Park Cemetery followed a service attended by several hundred mourners and which saw the caskets of Richard Sr. and Shirley flanked by those of their four children.

There was never a mystery of solving [the case] ... there was only a mystery of why [the alleged perpetrator] was never prosecuted.

— Retired schoolteacher Richard Wiles, reflecting on the conviction of law enforcement, authors and journalists alike as to Scolaro's guilt. 2018.

The January 1970 decision by Emmet County prosecutor Donald C. Noggle and Attorney General Frank Kelley that insufficient evidence existed to prosecute Scolaro despite ample evidence attesting to his guilt is believed to have been largely made for financial and political reasons, with senior officials within the county commission also likely viewing the costs and logistics of a high-profile case a burden on county resources. Furthermore, Noggle—appointed county prosecutor in 1968—had no experience of prosecuting murder cases at the time of his 1970 decision.

The investigation into the Robison family murders became largely inactive following Scolaro's suicide. However, as the law of Michigan does not permit an open murder case to be closed, the case officially remains open, although investigators, journalists and authors remain convinced of Scolaro's guilt.

Referencing his conviction of Scolaro's guilt, one of the detectives assigned to the Robison family murders, Michigan State Police Detective Lloyd Stearns, recollected in 2008 he had once informed Scolaro: "You killed the Robisons, and if you didn't, then you know who pulled the trigger." Forty years after the murders, Stearns maintained this comment reflected the collective mindset of the investigators assigned to the case.

The alleged perpetrator's suicide left many questions unanswered pertaining to the actual events surrounding the murders and their actual motive. These include whether the perpetrator acted alone, and whether he was aided and abetted by one or more other individuals.

== See also ==
- Cold case
- Crime in Michigan
- Embezzlement
- List of homicides in Michigan
- List of solved missing person cases: 1950–1999
- List of unsolved murders (1900–1979)

== Cited works and further reading ==
- Branson, Jack; Branson, Mary (2011). Delayed Justice: Inside Stories from America's Best Cold Case Investigations. Amherst, New York: Prometheus Books. ISBN 978-1-616-14392-3.
- Buhk, Todd (2021). Cold Case Michigan. United States: History Press. ISBN 978-1-467-14873-3.
- Dietz, Mary Lorentz (1983). Killing for Profit: The Social Organization of Felony Homicide. Boston, Massachusetts: Nelson-Hall Publishers. ISBN 978-0-830-41008-8.
- Evans, Colin (1996). The Casebook of Forensic Detection: How Science Solved 100 of the World's Most Baffling Crimes. New York City: John Wiley & Sons Inc. ISBN 978-0-471-07650-6.
- Halber, Deborah (2015). The Skeleton Crew: How Amateur Sleuths Are Solving America's Coldest Cases. New York: Simon & Schuster. ISBN 978-1-451-65758-6.
- Hickey, Eric (2003). Encyclopedia of Murder and Violent Crime. London: Sage Publications. ISBN 0-7619-2437-X.
- Katz, Hélèna (2010). Cold Cases: Famous Unsolved Mysteries, Crimes, and Disappearances in America. Santa Barbara: Greenwood Publishing Group. ISBN 978-0-313-37692-4.
- Leyton, Elliot (2011) [1986]. Hunting Humans: The Rise Of The Modern Multiple Murderer. Toronto: McClelland & Stewart. ISBN 978-0-140-11687-8.
- Lester, David (2004). Mass Murder: The Scourge of the 21st Century. Hauppauge, New York: Nova Science Publishers. ISBN 978-1-590-33929-9.
- Link, Mardi (2009). When Evil Came to Good Hart. Ann Arbor, Michigan: University of Michigan Press. ISBN 978-0-472-02196-3.
- Mayo, Michael (2013). American Murder: Criminals, Crime, and the Media. Canton, Michigan: Visible Ink Press. ISBN 978-1-578-59191-6.
- McRery, Nigel (2013). Silent Witnesses: A History of Forensic Science. London: Random House Books. ISBN 978-1-847-94683-6.
- Meyers, Charles (2004). Silent Evidence: Cases from Forensic Science. Charlotte, North Carolina: Catawba Publishing Company. ISBN 978-1-887-90539-8.
- Newton, Michael (2004). The Encyclopedia of Unsolved Crimes. New York City: Checkmark Books. ISBN 0-816-04980-7.
- Phelps, M. William (2020). Where Monsters Hide: Sex, Murder, and Madness in the Midwest. New York: Pinnacle Books. ISBN 978-0-786-04474-0.
- Rogers, D. Laurence (2018). Historic Tales of Michigan Up North. United States: History Press. ISBN 978-1-467-13866-6.
- Yount, Lisa (2007). Forensic Science: From Fibers to Fingerprints. New York City: Chelsea House Publishing. ISBN 978-1-604-13061-4.
