= Christ Brotherhood =

UFO religion group

- Formation: December 16, 1956; 69 years ago
- Founder: Wallace C. Halsey
- Founded at: Orange, California, U.S.
- Type: UFO religion group

Christ Brotherhood, Inc. was a UFO religious group founded on December 16, 1956, in Orange, California, United States, by Wallace C. Halsey. Halsey claimed that during his sleep, he channeled messages from extraterrestrials who warned of the impending destruction of the world and the gathering of a remnant of humanity to be saved.

Halsey described Christ Brotherhood, Inc. as a non-profit religious educational organization founded with the goal of "bringing greater understanding to all mankind." According to Halsey, the organization comprised members of 52 different religious denominations.

== Construction of Rocky Mountain complex ==
Halsey led at least some members of the group to Cache Valley, Utah, where they began construction of a compound intended to include underground bomb shelters in the mountains east of Smithfield City in the summer of 1961. The location in Smithfield's Main Canyon was selected due to the identification of the Rocky Mountains as a place of safety by Joseph Smith, the founding prophet of the Church of Jesus Christ of Latter-day Saints and other Latter Day Saint movement churches.

The shelter complex was intended to house approximately 1000 persons and was intended, according to Halsey, "for the safety of anyone who can get there in case of enemy attack," with no charge for admission or special permission required for entry. Halsey also stated the Brotherhood bought heavy equipment and cleared roads to the site, which rested on 45-acres purchased from S. Ivan Nilson.

It was estimated an excavation of 30,000 square feet would be required to build the intended complex, which Halsey intended to furnish with bomb-proof facilities for food storage, medical supplies, sanitation systems, and radio transmission equipment. Ray Barnes, who was appointed to supervise the excavation, noted the plans called for three or four concussion pockets to help attenuate shock force from a nuclear blast, as well as a robust filtration system to reduce exposure to radioactive fallout. Plans for the complex also called for a 100,000 gallon cistern for water storage, which the Brotherhood hoped would be supplemented by a spring they hoped to discover during the excavation process. Halsey planned to construct 100 small cabins at the site to provide housing outside the fallout shelter.

Also in 1961, two unnamed members of the Brotherhood selected a site for similar shelter complex at Aspen, Colorado, which would be linked to the Utah site by radio equipment. The Utah shelter was not completed, but the Brotherhood did construct several homes and a small church on the property.

== Leader's disappearance and group's disintegration ==
The brotherhood apparently lost cohesion following Halsey's disappearance as a passenger on a small aircraft flight from Utah to Nevada in March 1963. Despite an extensive air search and attempts by Halsey's UFO religion associates to solve the mystery using extraterrestrial assistance, the plane remained unfound for 13 years, until a lost deer hunter stumbled across the wreckage (including the bodies of Halsey and pilot Harry Cleveland Ross, Jr., a former mayor of Seal Beach, California and a business associate of Halsey) on a rugged mountainside near St. George, Utah.

Some of Halsey's teachings to the Brotherhood were documented in Cosmic End-Time Secrets, a volume published posthumously in 1965 that included the messages purportedly channeled from extraterrestrial life forms to Halsey.
