= Tallyman =

Numerical recordkeeper

A tallyman is an individual who keeps a numerical record with tally marks, historically often on tally sticks.

== Vote counter ==
In Ireland, it is common for political parties to provide private observers when ballot boxes are opened. These tallymen keep a tally of the preferences of visible voting papers and allow an early initial estimate of which candidates are likely to win in the drawn-out single transferable vote counting process. Since the public voting process is by then complete, it is usual for tallymen from different parties to share information.

== Head counter ==
Another possible definition is a person who called to literally do a head count, presumably on behalf of either the town council or the house owners. This is rumoured to have occurred in Liverpool, in the years after the First World War. Mechanical tally counters can make such head counts easier, by removing the need to make any marks.

== Debt collector ==
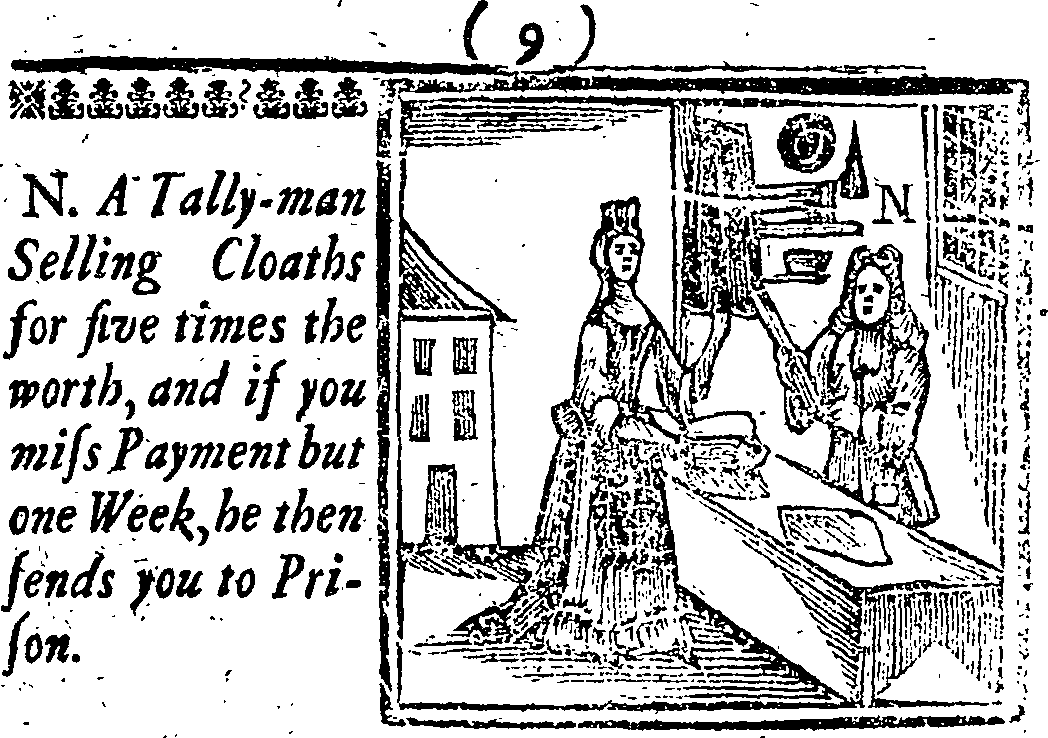
Illustration of a tallyman, 1709

In poorer parts of England (including the north and the East End of London), the tallyman was the hire purchase collector, who visited each week to collect the payments for goods purchased on the 'never never', or hire purchase. These people still had such employment up until the 1980s.

The title tallyman extended to the keeper of a village pound as animals were often held against debts, and tally sticks were used to prove they could be released.

== In popular culture ==
- "'The tallyman,' Mum told me, 'slice off the top of the stems of the bunches as they take them in. Then him count the little stubs he just sliced off and pay the farmer.'" explains a Ms. Wade in Andrea Levy’s novel "Fruit of the Lemon".
- Harry Belafonte addresses the tallyman in "Day-O (The Banana Boat Song)."
- In 1967 Graham Gouldman wrote a song called "Tallyman," which was recorded by Jeff Beck and reached #30 on the British charts.
- Heavy metal singer Udo Dirkschneider produced a song called "Tallyman."
- The Tally Man is the name of two super villains in the DC Universe, usually enemies of Batman. The original was a "collector" of human lives, having killed a criminal debt collector in his boyhood.
- The credit information company Experian Tallyman markets debt collection management software called Tallyman, a product originally purchased from Talgentra.
- The Tallyman appears in the Charmed (2018 TV series).

== See also ==
- Tally
