= Wilbert Coffin =

Canadian murderer

- Coffin's booking photo (1953)
- Born: 23 October 1915; Gaspésie–Îles-de-la-Madeleine, Quebec, Canada
- Died: 10 February 1956 (aged 40); Bordeaux Prison, Montreal, Quebec, Canada
- Status: Executed by hanging
- Conviction: Murder
- Penalty: Death

Details
- Victims: 3
- Country: Canada
- Location: Gaspé, Quebec

Wilbert Coffin (23 October 1915 – 10 February 1956) was a Canadian prospector who was convicted of murder and executed in Canada. Montreal journalist, editor, author and politician Jacques Hebert raised doubt as to Coffin's guilt in J'accuse les assassins de Coffin, published in 1963. The book led to a royal commission which upheld the conviction.

Eugene Lindsey, his 17-year-old son Richard, and 20-year-old Frederick Claar were last seen going into the woods to hunt in the Gaspé region of Quebec. Richard Lindsey had graduated from high school the day before the trip. A month later on 15 July 1953 the remains of Eugene were found torn apart by bears, and eight days later the bodies of Richard and Claar were found 4 kilometres (2.5 miles) away.

Coffin was found in possession of some belongings of the deceased and was accused of ambushing the men and stealing more than $600. He and others were known to salvage abandoned property in the area, and claimed to have acquired the property when he found the dead men's abandoned vehicle.

Coffin was convicted of the murder of 17-year-old Richard Lindsey and sentenced to death by hanging. After his conviction, he went through seven reprieves where he was denied clemency by the Quebec Court of Appeals, the Canadian Supreme Court and the Prime Minister Louis St. Laurent's cabinet. He was hanged on 10 February 1956, having been denied his final wish to marry his partner Marion Petrie, mother of their 8-year-old son James.

James (now Jim) is working to have Wilbert's case re-opened under the new bill C-40.

== Posthumous ==
Frederick Gilbert Thompson confessed to the crime in 1958, naming his friend Johnny Green as Richard's killer. He recanted his confession and his story was dismissed as not credible.

Coffin was portrayed by August Schellenberg in the 1980 film The Coffin Affair, and by Wayne Robson in the "Regina v. Coffin" episode of the CBC Television anthology series Scales of Justice.

== See also ==
- Coffin affair
