= List of kidnappings (1960–1969) =

The following is a list of kidnappings that occurred between 1960 and 1969, summarizing the events of each case, including instances of celebrity abductions, claimed hoaxes, suspected kidnappings, extradition abductions, and mass kidnappings.

== List ==
Date	Image	Victim(s)	Abductor(s)	Location	Age of victim(s)	Outcome	Notes
1960		CK Tang	Armed gang	Singapore	59	Released	The Chinese businessman was kidnapped by four armed thugs, but was freed unharmed within 84 hours after the family reportedly paid S$150,000 in ransom.
9 February 1960		Adolph Coors III	Joseph Corbett Jr.	(United States) Morrison, Colorado, U.S.	44	Murdered	Corbett attempted to kidnap Coors on a single-lane bridge outside of Morrison, Colorado, but a struggle ensued and Corbett shot Coors twice in the back, killing him. Corbett then dumped Coors' dead body near Pikes Peak and mailed a ransom note demanding $500,000. That night, Corbett mistakenly believed he was being watched by the Federal Bureau of Investigation, and left Denver the following morning. He was captured nine months later in Vancouver, British Columbia, Canada and convicted of first degree murder.
7 July 1960		Graeme Thorne	Stephen Leslie Bradley	New South Wales, Australia	8	Murdered	Graeme's parents, Bazil and Freda Thorne, won the £100,000 Opera House Lottery (at that time, the names of winners were published). Five weeks later Stephen Leslie Bradley abducted Graeme and demanded a ransom. He was killed and dumped, the partially decomposed body being discovered on 16 August. The case led to tighter rules about the publication of the names of lottery winners.
11 July 1960		Edward Bartels	Victor Feguer	(United States) Dubuque, Iowa, U.S.	34	Murdered	Edward Bartels was a doctor working in Dubuque, Iowa, who was abducted by drifter Victor Feguer, who intended to steal drugs from him. Feguer lured Bartels to his boarding house by claiming that a woman was suffering from a medical emergency before abducting him and taking him to Illinois, where he shot Bartels in the head and dumped his body in a cornfield.
29 July 1960		Carole Sgritta	Richard Delage	(United States) Westchester County, New York, U.S.	24	Murdered	A Long Island schoolteacher abducted and murdered by Richard Delage. Her body was discarded in the New Croton Reservoir. She had been shot four times in the head with a revolver.
17 December 1960		Abebe Aregai	Unknown	Ethiopia	57	Murdered	An Ethiopian military commander who fell victim to the 1960 Ethiopian coup attempt.
22 August 1961		Michael Gregsten	James Hanratty	Dorney Reach, Buckinghamshire, England	36	Murdered	On 22 August 1961, Michael Gregsten and his mistress Valerie Storie were sitting in Gregsten's car in Dorney Reach, Buckinghamshire, when a masked man holding a gun approached them and hijacked the car, forcing Gregsten to drive away up the A6 and keep driving until 1.30am the next day, when he tied Storie's hands behind her back, shot Gregsten in the head and raped Storie. The man then forced Storie to drag Gregsten's body out of the car, shot her five times and drove off. Storie survived after being taken to hospital. Their abductor, James Hanratty, was executed by hanging on 4 April 1962.
22 August 1961		Valerie Storie	James Hanratty	Dorney Reach, Buckinghamshire, England	23	Survived	
22 October 1962		Carol Ann Dougherty	Unknown	(United States) Bristol, Pennsylvania, U.S.	9	Murdered	Carol Dougherty was abducted by an unknown assailant on her way to the library from home. She was later found inside St. Mark's Roman Catholic Church, which she herself had frequented before, having been raped and strangled. Although there have been several suspects and leads on the perpetrator in the intervening years, the crime remains unsolved.
3 March 1963		Lois Ann Jameson	Ernesto Miranda	(United States) Phoenix, Arizona, U.S.	18	Released	Jameson was abducted near a bus stop while returning from work. Miranda drove her twenty minutes out of town before raping her and driving her back, whereupon she was released. Miranda was arrested ten days later and convicted of kidnapping and rape, but had his conviction overturned in Miranda v. Arizona due to a violation of his Fifth Amendment rights. A second jury later convicted Miranda and he was sentenced to imprisonment for twenty years.
9 March 1963		Karl Francis Hettinger	Gregory Powell and Jimmy Lee Smith	(United States) Bakersfield, California, U.S.	28	Escaped	Los Angeles Police Department officers. Both men were kidnapped by criminals Gregory Powell and Jimmy Lee Smith on 9 March 1963 and driven to an onion field near Bakersfield, California. Campbell was shot, while Hettinger managed to escape to a farmhouse where he called for help.
9 March 1963		Ian James Campbell	Gregory Powell and Jimmy Lee Smith	(United States) Bakersfield, California, U.S.	31	Murdered	Los Angeles Police Department officers. Both men were kidnapped by criminals Gregory Powell and Jimmy Lee Smith on 9 March 1963 and driven to an onion field near Bakersfield, California. Campbell was shot, while Hettinger managed to escape to a farmhouse where he called for help.
1 May 1963		Yoshie Nakata	Kazuo Ishikawa	Sayama, Japan	16	Murdered	16-year-old Yoshie Nakata was abducted on her way home from school. A ransom note was delivered to her family later that night, but attempts to deliver the ransom failed and Nakata was found raped and murdered three days after her abduction. Farm worker Kazuo Ishikawa, a member of the discriminated burakumin caste, served 31 years in prison for the crime.
31 May 1963		Margaret Guyan	Henry John Burnett	Aberdeen, Scotland	25	Rescued	Guyan's estranged husband, Henry Burnett, abducted her from her flat with a shotgun after she tried to leave him, in the process killing her brother Thomas. Burnett attempted to flee with Guyan in a car he had stolen, but was intercepted by police after driving 15 miles and surrendered peacefully, releasing Guyan unharmed. Burnett was later hanged for murdering Thomas Guyan.
8 June 1963		Margaret L. Williams	John Getreu	West Germany	18	Murdered	On the evening of June 8, 1963, just before graduation, 18-year-old John Getreu, the son of a U.S. Army serviceman, attended a school disco, where he met 15-year-old Margaret L. Williams, the daughter of a U.S. Army chaplain. After the dance ended, Getreu took her to the campus' baseball field, where he assaulted, raped and beat her. Williams suffered a severe head injury, and later died from complications.
August 1963		Kenneth Abrahams	South African Police	(United Kingdom) Ghanzi, Botswana	c.27	Released	Namibians Abrahams, Beukes, Shipanga and Smit were arrested in Ghanzi because of their actions in recruiting soldiers for SWAPO's military wing, the People's Liberation Army of Namibia. All four were released by the South African Police after twenty days of captivity.
August 1963		Hermanus Beukes	South African Police	(United Kingdom) Ghanzi, Botswana	50	Released	Namibians Abrahams, Beukes, Shipanga and Smit were arrested in Ghanzi because of their actions in recruiting soldiers for SWAPO's military wing, the People's Liberation Army of Namibia. All four were released by the South African Police after twenty days of captivity.
August 1963		Andreas Shipanga	South African Police	(United Kingdom) Ghanzi, Botswana	31	Released	Namibians Abrahams, Beukes, Shipanga and Smit were arrested in Ghanzi because of their actions in recruiting soldiers for SWAPO's military wing, the People's Liberation Army of Namibia. All four were released by the South African Police after twenty days of captivity.
August 1963		Paul Smit	South African Police	(United Kingdom) Ghanzi, Botswana	Unknown	Released	Namibians Abrahams, Beukes, Shipanga and Smit were arrested in Ghanzi because of their actions in recruiting soldiers for SWAPO's military wing, the People's Liberation Army of Namibia. All four were released by the South African Police after twenty days of captivity.
15 March 1964		Mary Theresa Simpson	Alfred Murray Jr.	(United States) Elmira, New York, U.S.	12	Murdered	A 12-year-old girl from Elmira, New York, who was kidnapped, sexually assaulted and killed on March 15, 1964. Her killer was identified as Alfred Murray Jr. in 2026, 22 years after Murray's death.
18 March 1964		Marise Chiverella	James Paul Forte	(United States) Hazleton, Pennsylvania, U.S.	9	Murdered	Chiverella was abducted while carrying canned goods for her teacher, with Forte raping and strangling her before dumping her body in a coal-mining pit. The murder remained unsolved until 2022, when Parabon NanoLabs used DNA left by Forte to identify him as the killer. He could not be arrested, as he had died in 1980.
27 April 1964		Paul Joseph Fronczak	Unknown	(United States) Michael Reese Hospital, Chicago, Illinois, U.S.	1 day	Found alive	Fronczak was one day old when he was abducted from Michael Reese Hospital by an unknown woman posing as a nurse. A year later, a baby believed to be Paul was found outside a variety store in Newark, New Jersey, and was subsequently given to the Fronczaks. In August 2013, DNA testing determined that the child was not Paul, leading to the case's re-opening On 18 December 2019, it was announced that the real Paul Joseph Fronczak had been identified as a 55-year-old man who asked to remain anonymous, though it was revealed he had been living as Kevin Ray Baty after his death from cancer the following year.
2 May 1964		Henry Hezekiah Dee	James Ford Seale	(United States) Roxie, Mississippi, U.S.	19	Murdered	Two black 19-year-olds who were abducted by Ku Klux Klan member James Ford Seale, who mistakenly believed that they were civil rights activists. Seale and several accomplices drove them to a farm in the Homochitto National Forest and beat them with sticks before duct-taping their hands and mouths and driving 100 miles to the Old River in Louisiana, where Seale attached weights to their feet and threw them into the river to drown. Seale was eventually found guilty of the crime in 2007.
2 May 1964		Charles Eddie Moore	James Ford Seale	(United States) Roxie, Mississippi, U.S.	19	Murdered	Two black 19-year-olds who were abducted by Ku Klux Klan member James Ford Seale, who mistakenly believed that they were civil rights activists. Seale and several accomplices drove them to a farm in the Homochitto National Forest and beat them with sticks before duct-taping their hands and mouths and driving 100 miles to the Old River in Louisiana, where Seale attached weights to their feet and threw them into the river to drown. Seale was eventually found guilty of the crime in 2007.
21 June 1964		James Chaney	Ku Klux Klan, Neshoba County Sheriff's Office	(United States) Neshoba County, Mississippi, U.S.	21	Murdered	Three civil rights activists who were abducted and murdered by members of the Ku Klux Klan and the Neshoba County Sheriff's Office while campaigning for African-American voting rights during Freedom Summer. Eight of the perpetrators were convicted or pleaded guilty at a Federal trial in 1967, including the Klan's national leader Samuel Bowers, and a ninth, Edgar Ray Killen, was convicted of the manslaughter of Chaney, Goodman, and Schwerner forty-one years later.
21 June 1964		Andrew Goodman	Ku Klux Klan, Neshoba County Sheriff's Office	(United States) Neshoba County, Mississippi, U.S.	20	Murdered	Three civil rights activists who were abducted and murdered by members of the Ku Klux Klan and the Neshoba County Sheriff's Office while campaigning for African-American voting rights during Freedom Summer. Eight of the perpetrators were convicted or pleaded guilty at a Federal trial in 1967, including the Klan's national leader Samuel Bowers, and a ninth, Edgar Ray Killen, was convicted of the manslaughter of Chaney, Goodman, and Schwerner forty-one years later.
21 June 1964		Michael Schwerner	Ku Klux Klan, Neshoba County Sheriff's Office	(United States) Neshoba County, Mississippi, U.S.	24	Murdered	Three civil rights activists who were abducted and murdered by members of the Ku Klux Klan and the Neshoba County Sheriff's Office while campaigning for African-American voting rights during Freedom Summer. Eight of the perpetrators were convicted or pleaded guilty at a Federal trial in 1967, including the Klan's national leader Samuel Bowers, and a ninth, Edgar Ray Killen, was convicted of the manslaughter of Chaney, Goodman, and Schwerner forty-one years later.
2 December 1964		Julia Taylor	Raymond Leslie Morris	Bloxwich, West Midlands, England	9	Survived	Nine-year-old Julia Taylor was lured into a car by a man claiming to be a friend of her mother on 2 December 1964 and driven to a pile of slag heaps near Bentley, where she was raped, strangled and thrown in a ditch. She was found alive by a cyclist fifty minutes later; had this cyclist not come across her and called an ambulance, she likely would have died of exposure within 20 minutes. Police linked Taylor's abduction to the later Cannock Chase murders, and Taylor identified the man convicted of the murders, Raymond Leslie Morris, as her abductor five years later.
14 July 1965		Missy Crimmins	Alice Crimmins (alleged) (Note: After two trials, Crimmins was convicted of the manslaughter of Missy and the murder of Eddie Jr. Her conviction was overturned on appeal two years later and she was convicted of Missy's manslaughter, but not Eddie's murder, which was believed to have happened at a different time and place.)	(United States) Queens, New York City, U.S.	4	Murdered	The Crimmins children were reported missing from their apartment on 14 July 1965. Missy Crimmins was found strangled in a vacant lot later that day, and Eddie Jr. was found dead in another lot five days after. The children's mother, Alice Crimmins, stood trial in 1968. The prosecution alleged that she killed Missy and disposed of the body with an unidentified accomplice before taking Eddie Jr. to where his body was found and killing him too to conceal the crime. Crimmins was convicted of Eddie Jr.'s murder and Missy's manslaughter after two trials; her murder conviction was later reversed due to insufficient evidence and prosecutorial misconduct, and she would serve four years in prison for Missy's manslaughter.
14 July 1965		Eddie Crimmins Jr.	Alice Crimmins (alleged)	(United States) Queens, New York City, U.S.	5	Murdered	
24 July 1965		Richard P. Keirn	North Vietnamese soldiers	Hanoi, Vietnam	40	Released	A fighter pilot in the United States Air Force. Keirn was taken prisoner in July 1965 after his aircraft was shot down during the Vietnam War. He had previously been a prisoner of war in World War II. Keirn was later repatriated to the United States as part of Operation Homecoming.
8 September 1965		Margaret Reynolds	Raymond Leslie Morris	Aston, Birmingham, England	6	Murdered	The first victim of the Cannock Chase murders committed by serial killer Raymond Leslie Morris. She was abducted by Morris while walking to school in the afternoon, having returned home for lunch, and was found raped and murdered on 12 January 1966 near the body of another victim, Diana Tift.
26 December 1965		Franca Viola	Filippo Melodia and associates	Sicily, Italy	17	Released	Italian woman who was kidnapped by mafioso Filippo Melodia, to whom she was previously forcibly engaged. He and associates held her captive; he raped her on multiple occasions. Even after her release, Viola was ostracized for refusing to marry him in a "rehabilitating marriage", with the case serving as a stepping point for changes in law regarding bridal kidnappings.
30 December 1965		Diana Tift	Raymond Leslie Morris	Walsall, West Midlands, England	5	Murdered	The second victim of the Cannock Chase murders committed by serial killer Raymond Leslie Morris. She was abducted by Morris while walking home from her grandmother's house and was found raped and murdered on 12 January 1966 near the body of another victim, Margaret Reynolds.
26 January 1966		Jane Nartare Beaumont	Unknown	Glenelg, South Australia	9	Unknown	Three siblings who disappeared from Glenelg Beach near Adelaide, South Australia on Australia Day 1966 in a suspected abduction and murder. The regular and widespread attention given to the case, its significance in Australian criminal history, and the fact that their disappearance has never been explained, has led to the story being continually revisited by the media.
26 January 1966		Arnna Kathleen Beaumont	Unknown	Glenelg, South Australia	7	Unknown	Three siblings who disappeared from Glenelg Beach near Adelaide, South Australia on Australia Day 1966 in a suspected abduction and murder. The regular and widespread attention given to the case, its significance in Australian criminal history, and the fact that their disappearance has never been explained, has led to the story being continually revisited by the media.
26 January 1966		Grant Ellis Beaumont	Unknown	Glenelg, South Australia	4	Unknown	Three siblings who disappeared from Glenelg Beach near Adelaide, South Australia on Australia Day 1966 in a suspected abduction and murder. The regular and widespread attention given to the case, its significance in Australian criminal history, and the fact that their disappearance has never been explained, has led to the story being continually revisited by the media.
3 February 1966		Robert T. Hanson	Unknown	Vietnam	Unknown	Found dead	Two American pilots who crashed a plane in the Vietnam War, and were captured and served years in a POW camp before being released. Coffee wrote about his experience in a book called Beyond Survival.
3 February 1966		Gerald Coffee	Unknown	Vietnam	Unknown	Survived	Two American pilots who crashed a plane in the Vietnam War, and were captured and served years in a POW camp before being released. Coffee wrote about his experience in a book called Beyond Survival.
28 March 1966		Danny Goldman	Unknown	(United States) Surfside, Florida, U.S.	17	Unknown	An intruder broke into the home of the Goldman family and demanded $10,000. When he did not get the money, he abducted Danny Goldman and said that he wanted $25,000 by the end of the day. The kidnapper never contacted the family and Goldman was never found. Speculation surfaced that organized crime was behind the kidnapping because Goldman's father was involved in several banks that were controlled by organized crime figures.
27 July 1966		Brenda Sue Brown	Earl Parker and Thurman Price (both alleged) (Note: Police and prosecutors claimed that Parker and Price were responsible based on a confession from Parker which implicated the two men; however, both died before they could stand trial for the crime, leaving the case unresolved)	(United States) Shelby, North Carolina, U.S.	11	Murdered	An 11-year-old schoolgirl whose bludgeoned body was discovered near her home on the evening of her disappearance. A deathbed confession from one of her alleged murderers, Earl Parker, resulted in the arrest of the second alleged perpetrator, Thurman Andrew Price. Parker's deathbed confession was ruled admissible in court; however, Price died in 2012 while awaiting trial.
August 1966		Robert Hugh Brand	Kenneth McDuff and Roy Dale Green	(United States) Everman, Texas, U.S.	17	Murdered	Brand, Dunnam and Sullivan were abducted by Kenneth McDuff and Roy Dale Green while standing beside Brand's parked car on a baseball field in Everman, Texas. All three were ordered at gunpoint into the trunk of their car, which was driven to another location. Sullivan was later ordered into the trunk of McDuff's vehicle, and the boys shot to death. Sullivan was subsequently raped by both men, then strangled to death with a broomstick.
August 1966		Johnny Marcus Dunnam	Kenneth McDuff and Roy Dale Green	(United States) Everman, Texas, U.S.	15	Murdered	Brand, Dunnam and Sullivan were abducted by Kenneth McDuff and Roy Dale Green while standing beside Brand's parked car on a baseball field in Everman, Texas. All three were ordered at gunpoint into the trunk of their car, which was driven to another location. Sullivan was later ordered into the trunk of McDuff's vehicle, and the boys shot to death. Sullivan was subsequently raped by both men, then strangled to death with a broomstick.
August 1966		Edna Louise Sullivan	Kenneth McDuff and Roy Dale Green	(United States) Everman, Texas, U.S.	16	Murdered	Brand, Dunnam and Sullivan were abducted by Kenneth McDuff and Roy Dale Green while standing beside Brand's parked car on a baseball field in Everman, Texas. All three were ordered at gunpoint into the trunk of their car, which was driven to another location. Sullivan was later ordered into the trunk of McDuff's vehicle, and the boys shot to death. Sullivan was subsequently raped by both men, then strangled to death with a broomstick.
27 September 1966		Allen Redston	Unknown	Curtin, Australia	6	Murdered	Schoolboy who disappeared while going toward a friend's house, where they planned to spend a day at Curtin Tip. Redston's body was found on the next day, wrapped in a blanket, near the location. He had been bound and strangled, but nobody was ever arrested in his murder.
19 November 1966		Phan Thi Mao	David Gervase, Steven Cabbot Thomas, Cipriano Garcia, Joseph Garcia	Cat Tuong, Phu My District, Vietnam	21	Murdered	Vietnamese woman who was abducted from her village by four U.S. soldiers during the Vietnam War and repeatedly raped before being stabbed and shot to death by one of the soldiers, Steven Cabbot Thomas, in order to conceal the crime. Her body was buried on Hill 192.
March 1967		Unnamed 13-year-old girl	Stanley Bernson	(United States) Chattaroy, Washington, U.S.	13	Released	In March 1967, Stanley Marvin Bernson, an American murderer and self-confessed serial killer, abducted a 13-year-old girl and drove her around Chattaroy, an unincorporated area northeast of Spokane. The girl was returned to her home after suffering a head injury, which Bernson claimed was caused by a wrench hitting her when he crashed his car into a ditch. Bernson was given a six-month suspended sentence later that month.
6 April 1967		Doug Hegdahl	Vietnamese militiamen	Gulf of Tonkin	20	Released	Doug Hegdahl, a 20-year-old United States Navy petty officer second class, was knocked off the USS Canberra in the Gulf of Tonkin and subsequently held as a prisoner of war (POW) during the Vietnam War. On August 5, 1969, Hegdahl was released along with two other POWs as a propaganda move by the North Vietnamese.
26 June 1967		Maggie de la Riva	Jaime José, Basilio Pineda Jr., Rogelio Cañal, Edgardo Aquino	New Manila, Quezon City, Philippines	24	Released	De la Riva was abducted by four students from wealthy and influential families who forced her car off the road, dragged her into their car and gang-raped her before releasing her with a threat to kill her with an acid attack if she went to the police. All four rapists were sentenced to death; one committed suicide on death row in 1970, and the other three were executed on 17 May 1972.
19 August 1967		Christine Darby	Raymond Leslie Morris	Walsall, West Midlands, England	7	Murdered	The third and final victim of the Cannock Chase murders committed by serial killer Raymond Leslie Morris. She was abducted by Morris while playing with her friends under the pretext of showing him the way to Caldmore Green. She was found raped and murdered three days later. Her murder was linked to the earlier murders of Margaret Reynolds and Diana Tift in 1965. Morris was ultimately sentenced to life imprisonment for Darby's murder in 1969.
26 January 1968		Linda Katherine Slawson	Jerry Brudos	(United States) Portland, Oregon, U.S.	19	Murdered	On January 26, 1968, Linda Kay Slawson disappeared whilst selling encyclopedias in southwest Portland. Jerry Brudos told investigators that he had invited Slawson inside, before killing her and throwing her body into the Willamette River. Her remains were never found. Brudos pleaded guilty to three other murders, but the charge against him relating to Slawson's disappearance was dropped due to a lack of evidence.
23 August 1968		Ong Beang Leck	Lee Chor Pet, Lim Kim Kwee, Ho Kee Fatt, Richard Lai Choon Seng and Chow Sien Cheong	Singapore	19	Murdered	19-year-old Ong Beang Leck, the fourth child of a local millionaire, was abducted by four kidnappers into a car, with three of them using weapons, including a screwdriver and hammer, to brutally assault Ong before killing him. The four, together with a fifth person, also extorted a S$20,000 ransom from the victim's family after the murder. Following police investigations, the suspects were arrested in both Malaysia and Singapore, and the body of Ong was recovered from a manhole at Jurong. Lee, Lim and Ho, the trio who were identified as the ones who directly killed Ong, were hanged on 27 January 1963 for murder while Lai (who acted as the driver) and Chow (the fifth man) were each jailed for four years for negotiating and possessing the ransom money.
23 August 1968		Roy Tutill	Brian Field	Surrey, England	14	Murdered	14-year-old Roy Tutill was abducted while hitchhiking in Surrey in 1968 and found raped and strangled three days later. The case remained unsolved until 2001 (making it the oldest solved cold case in British history), when convicted sex offender Brian Field pleaded guilty based on DNA evidence. According to Field, he had drunkenly started touching Tutill's leg, at which point Tutill resisted and he proceeded to rape him before panicking and strangling him to death.
26 November 1968		Jan Susan Whitney	Jerry Brudos	(United States) Interstate 5, Oregon, U.S.	23	Murdered	On 26 November 1968, 23-year-old Jan Susan Whitney's car broke down on Interstate 5 between Salem and Albany. She was encountered by Jerry Brudos, who claimed he could fix her car if he drove home to collect his tools, to which Whitney agreed. When they parked in his driveway, Brudos entered the rear of the vehicle and asked her to close her eyes and say how to tie a shoelace without opening her eyes or moving her hands. She agreed to this challenge and Brudos strangled her from behind with a leather strap and raped her. He then engaged in necrophilia with her corpse before throwing her body into the Willamette River.
17 December 1968		Barbara Jane Mackle	Gary Steven Krist and Ruth Eisemann-Schier	(United States) Decatur, Georgia, U.S.	20	Rescued	Mackle was kidnapped and buried in a reinforced box with food, water, and air. She was rescued a few days later. She wrote a book about her experience that was later made into two TV movies.
27 March 1969		Karen Elena Sprinker	Jerry Brudos	(United States) Salem, Oregon, U.S.	18	Murdered	On 27 March 1969, 18-year-old Karen Elena Sprinker was abducted at gunpoint from the parking lot of a Meier & Frank department store whilst en route to meet her mother for lunch; she was then abducted at gunpoint by Jerry Brudos. Brudos was dressed as a woman during the attack. Brudos took her to his garage, made her try on his collection of undergarments and pose whilst he photographed her before raping her and strangling her by her neck from a pulley. Brudos later committed necrophilia acts with her body. He tied her body to a six-cylinder car engine with a nylon cord and threw it into the Willamette River.
23 April 1969		Linda Dawn Salee	Jerry Brudos	(United States) Portland, Oregon, U.S.	22	Murdered	On 23 April 1969, 22-year-old Linda Dawn Salee was abducted by Jerry Brudos from the Lloyd Center in Portland, Oregon. Brudos took her to his garage where he raped and strangled her before playing with her corpse. Afterwards, Brudos tied her body to a car transmission with a nylon cord before throwing her into the Willamette River.
20 May 1969		Alex Rackley	George W. Sams Jr., Warren Kimbro, Lonnie McLucas	(United States) New Haven, Connecticut, U.S.	19	Murdered	Rackley, a Black Panther Party member suspected of being a government informer, was abducted by fellow Black Panthers Sams, Kimbro and McLucas, who tortured him for two days at the Panther headquarters in New Haven until he confessed to betraying the party. He was then taken to isolated wetlands near Middlefield, where he was shot by Kimbro and McLucas. Rackley's body was disposed of in the Coginchaug River.
25 August 1969		Rosemary Calandriello	Robert Zarinsky	(United States) Atlantic Highlands, New Jersey, U.S.	17	Murdered	Calandriello is believed to have been kidnapped and murdered by Zarinsky, who was later convicted of her murder, even though her body has never been located.
4 September 1969		Charles Burke Elbrick	Revolutionary Movement 8th October Marxist political organization	Rio de Janeiro, Brazil	61	Released	An American diplomat kidnapped by the Revolutionary Movement 8th October; he was held hostage for 78 hours before he was released in exchange for 15 unnamed political prisoners and the publication of the group's manifesto.
4 September 1969		Matson Larse Kaarhus	Douglas Franklin Wright	(United States) Portland, Oregon, U.S.	5	Released	On the 4th of September, 1969, Douglas Franklin Wright broke into the home of Margaret M. Rosenberry and her granddaughter Kenneth Snelling, then shot them both to death before kidnapping Snelling's son, Matson Larse Kaarhus. Kaarhus was taken to multiple motels and was sexually assaulted. Kaarhus was released by Wright on a unknown date in September 1969.
31 October 1969		Pamela Hobley	Unknown	(United States) Oscoda, Michigan, U.S.	15	Unknown	Two teenage girls were believed to have been kidnapped prior to a scheduled party after a football game. Both are presumed dead.
31 October 1969		Patricia Spencer	Unknown	(United States) Oscoda, Michigan, U.S.	16	Unknown	Two teenage girls were believed to have been kidnapped prior to a scheduled party after a football game. Both are presumed dead.
29 December 1969		Muriel McKay	Arthur Hosein and Nizamodeen Hosein	Wimbledon, London, England	55	Murdered	Trinidadian brothers Arthur and Nizamodeen Hosein attempted to kidnap Anna Murdoch, the then-wife of tycoon Rupert Murdoch, for a £1 million ransom, but instead abducted the Australian wife of Murdoch's deputy chairman Alick McKay. During the investigation, many attempts were made to find the victim – family friends even consulted the psychic Gerard Croiset to help – but the body of McKay was never found and she was presumed murdered. In early 1970 the Hosein brothers were caught and convicted of kidnapping and murder.
