= Zarinsky =

Zarinsky (masculine), Zarinskaya (feminine), or Zarinskoye (neuter) may refer to:

- Zarinsky District, a district of Altai Krai, Russia
- Zarinskoye, a rural locality (a selo) in Kemerovo Oblast, Russia
- Robert Zarinsky (1940–2008), convicted murderer and suspected serial killer from New Jersey, USA
