= Richard Delage =

American murderer and suspected serial killer

- Born: Richard Tobias Delage; August 13, 1944 (age 82); Greenwich, Connecticut, U.S.
- Convictions: New York; Murder; Connecticut; Manslaughter; Kidnapping
- Penalty: New York; 20-years-to-life; Connecticut; 14–20 years

Details
- Victims: 2–4+
- Span of crimes: 1960 – 1969 (confirmed)
- Country: United States
- States: New York, Connecticut; Pennsylvania (suspected)
- Date apprehended: October 3, 1975
- Imprisoned at: Wyoming Correctional Facility, Attica, New York

Richard Tobias Delage (born August 13, 1944) is an American murderer and suspected serial killer. Convicted of the murders of two university students committed in 1960 and 1969, respectively, he remains a suspect in a similar double murder in Pennsylvania for which he has never been charged. He is currently incarcerated in a prison in New York for the murder charge in that state.

== Early life ==
Richard Tobias Delage was born on August 13, 1944, in the Cos Cob neighborhood of Greenwich, Connecticut, the eighth of nine children (6 boys, 3 girls) born to radio-television store owner Georges Delage and his wife, Mabel founded in 1921. At six months of age, Delage was struck by scarlet fever, but survived without any visible abnormalities.

Described as a bright and studious child who was greatly interested in astronomy and oceanography, Delage was even promoted to vice president of the Greenwich High School's Thespian Society due to his academic achievements. There were no reports of any sort of neglect or abuse in the Delage family household, nor any publicly known behavioral issues in Richard prior to his first arrest.

In late December 1960, the 16-year-old Delage was confined at the Fairfield Hills Hospital in Newtown for shooting a woman in Stamford, where he remained until July 9, 1961. According to Delage's brother, this incident occurred shortly after their father suffered from his first heart attack. After being released from the hospital, Delage was left unemployed after graduating from the University of Connecticut in Storrs in 1971. He soon moved to Woodstock and then to Thompson, where he lived in a middle-class development neighborhood with his wife and found work as a television repairman.

== Murders ==
=== Carole Sgritta ===
On July 29, 1960, 24-year-old Carole Sgritta, a schoolteacher who taught in Long Island, left her boarding house to go pick up her boyfriend in Mount Kisco so they could visit her grandparents in Stamford, Connecticut. Later that afternoon, Wallace "Wally" Tompkins, a motorist passing by the New Croton Reservoir noticed what appeared to be a tall, slender young man dragging a woman's body from a car and immediately called the police from a nearby payphone. By the time they arrived and searched the area, however, the man had disappeared. Sgritta's body was found not long afterwards, having been shot four times in the head with a .32 S&W pocket revolver inside her own car. Strangely, nothing had been stolen from her, indicating that robbery was not a motive for the killing.

A search of the nearby area quickly recovered the murder weapon and a Stetson-like hat, but there was no possible clue leading to the killer. When questioned further, Tompkins claimed that the man he had seen was about 25 years of age; tall; slender; wore dark-rimmed glasses and a cowboy-type hat, and evidently had a revolver in his trousers. Using this description, local authorities questioned numerous young men who fit the description and gathered correspondence from across the nation, Puerto Rico and even several foreign countries in an attempt to find a lead to Sgritta's killer. To their disappointment, they failed to locate any clues and the crime went unsolved for almost 15 years.

=== Paget Weatherley ===
On November 13, 1969, 23-year-old Paget Weatherley, a student at the University of Connecticut, failed to attend her classes, much to the surprise of her roommate, Diane Gorenstein. Initially brushing it off as the possibility that she had gone to visit friends over the weekend, Gorenstein became concerned when a radio report on Sunday claimed that the body of an unidentified young woman had been discovered in Bolton. She attempted to contact Weatherley's uncle, Donald Fitch, but as he did not respond, she instead relayed the information to Weatherley's physiology professor, Dr. Alan Brush, who immediately notified police. By that time, Fitch himself had learned of the discovery and traveled to Bolton, where he positively identified the young woman as his niece. Dental records later conclusively proved that it was her. An autopsy determined that she had been shot three times in the chest.

While they were unable to discern a motive, local police narrowed down the time of death as either the late afternoon or early evening of November 13, the day Weatherley disappeared. They also believed that she might have met her killer on the campus' restaurant, and due to this, they requested for assistance from the public in identifying anybody who was seen with Weatherley on that date. Investigators eventually narrowed down the time-frame even further, but were troubled by a 45-minute timespan in which they were unable to trace Weatherley's whereabouts.

While the police were gathering clues and witness testimony, Dr. James Brussel, a renowned psychiatrist involved with profiling offenders such as George Metesky and Albert DeSalvo, devised a psychiatric profile of the killer. In his profile, Brussel suggested that the offender was a white male under 30 years of age; of average build and height; of normal intelligence and good education; likely shy around women and easily panicked; possibly acquainted with the victim and suffers from some kind of perversion that enables him to kill. However, aside from the claim that shots apparently been fired in nearby Mansfield on the same afternoon as Weatherley's death, no usable new information surfaced in her killing.

== Arrest, trial and imprisonment ==
On October 3, 1975, Delage was arrested for the kidnapping of a hitchhiker in Mansfield and thereafter quickly interned at the Norwich State Hospital. While receiving treatment, he contacted Dr. Hans Langhammer, a psychiatrist who worked in the hospital, claiming that he had "done something wrong". After reportedly giving statements implicating him in the murder of Carole Sgritta, Langhammer informed the authorities, who swiftly arrested Delage. A ballistics expert determined that his revolver was the same one used in the murder of Weatherley and possibly also the 1970 double murder of June Eberlin and Mary Lenihan, both 19, who were found shot to death in Fulton County, Pennsylvania on November 4, 1970.

Following these revelations, a $250,000 bail was set for Delage in the Sgritta murder. He was soon charged with her murder and extradited to face murder charges in New York. Initially, Delage's attorney attempted to convince the court to try his client as a juvenile – as he was 15 years old when he had killed Sgritta – but this motion was rejected, meaning that Delage could potentially face with the death penalty. Shortly afterwards, he agreed to plead guilty in exchange for a 20-years-to-life term. To avoid standing trial in Connecticut, Delage pleaded to the lesser charge of manslaughter and was sentenced to 14-to-20 years imprisonment for killing Weatherley.

As of April 2025, Delage is incarcerated at the Franklin Correctional Facility in Malone, New York, where he continues to serve his life term for Sgritta's murder. He has never been charged with the murders of Eberlin and Lenihan, both of which remain unsolved.

== See also ==
- List of kidnappings (1960–1969)
