= Killing of Brenda Sue Brown =

Murder of an American girl

Brenda Sue Brown
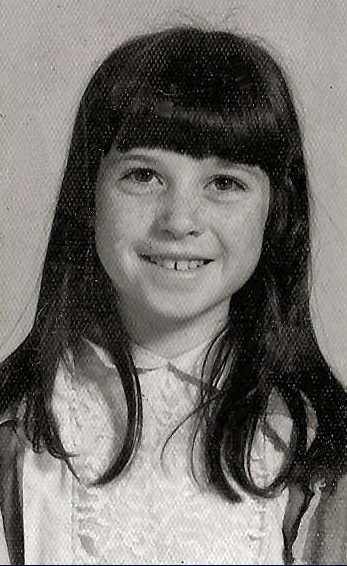
- Born: May 15, 1955; Sanford, North Carolina, U.S.
- Died: July 27, 1966 (aged 11); Shelby, North Carolina, United States
- Cause of death: Homicide by blunt trauma
- Resting place: Sunset Cemetery, Cleveland County, North Carolina, U.S. 35.2594°N 81.5466°W (approximate)
- Occupation: Student
- Known for: Murder victim

Brenda Sue Brown (May 15, 1955 – July 27, 1966) was an 11-year-old girl who was abducted and murdered. Her body was found by rescue workers in a wooded area near downtown Shelby, North Carolina. With no leads and insufficient evidence to make an arrest, the murder became a cold case.

The case remained cold until a series of newspaper articles 40 years later brought forth new evidence in the spring of 2006.

== Events of July 27, 1966 ==
After a morning of arguing over a powder-puff compact with her younger sisters, Brenda Sue was asked to walk her 6-year-old sister, Patricia, two blocks to a Head Start class. This was the last time Brenda Sue was seen alive.

At 10:15 a.m. Brenda Sue's mother, Gladys Brown, began a door-to-door search. Brown drove through her neighborhood, asking neighbors and passing motorists if they had seen the girl. An hour later, a search team was formed by members of the Shelby Rescue Squad.

At 6:45 p.m. Brenda Sue's nude body was found in a wooded area 150 feet from South Lafayette Street and not far from her home. Her body was covered with freshly cut tree limbs, leaves, and brush. The red and white dress she had been wearing was folded neatly and placed atop the brush. A bloody rock was found nearby.

== Investigation ==
Authorities determined that Brenda Sue had been beaten to death with the rock found nearby. Her skull had been fractured in twelve places. Police reported that, although the body was nude, she had not been raped.

Police believed the killer was on foot because, due to heavy traffic on South Lafayette Street, he would not have been able to get out of a car and force the girl into the woods without being seen.

At the time, police had several suspects. These included an unidentified bald white man who had exposed himself to Brenda Sue's sister a few days earlier, and a 13-year-old, mentally disabled, black boy named Robert Roseboro.

The unidentified white man who exposed himself could not be found.

Robert Roseboro was briefly questioned by police. When officer Harold Smith questioned him, Roseboro remained silent. "He wouldn't answer. He just sat there. Roseboro´s silence made him more suspicious," Smith said. According to Smith, the fact that Roseboro lived a few hundred yards from where Brenda Sue's body was found and refused to answer questions made him a suspect.

The public was baffled as to why Roseboro, who was seen in the area on the morning of Brenda Sue's murder, was not interrogated further by police. People theorized that Roseboro may have been protected by a local crime syndicate which dominated the town of Shelby in the 1960s.

"We just didn't have enough evidence on him. We had to let him go," Smith said. He said that he and other investigators believed Roseboro had killed Brenda Sue.

== Murder of Mary Helen Williams ==
At 11:30 a.m. on June 22, 1968, a woman and her daughter arrived at Mary's Cannon Towel Outlet. This was Mary Helen Williams's business, located on Dixon Boulevard in Shelby. There they saw a "CLOSED" sign hanging in a window.

The daughter looked in the window and saw a woman lying on the floor covered in blood. Shelby police were called to the business, where Robert Roseboro walked out with his hands in the air. Mary Helen Williams was found nude, with her body beaten and stabbed by a pair of scissors. The county coroner later said that, though Mrs. Williams was found nude, she had not been raped. In the store's restroom, police found Mrs. Williams's dress and underwear.

At the time of Williams's murder, racial segregation was intense in Shelby. Rumors of the Ku Klux Klan threatening to harm Roseboro were taken so seriously that he was secretly transferred to a jail in a nearby county until his trial in 1969.

During the two-day murder trial, a pathologist testified that blood found on Roseboro's clothes was type "A," which matched Mrs. Williams's blood type. Roseboro denied killing Mrs. Williams, saying that police lied about the investigation and that he would have had no motive for the murder because there had been no rape or robbery. He drew maps of where he was in the building when police arrived and explained how Mrs. Williams's blood had gotten onto his clothes.

Roseboro was found guilty in May 1969 of murdering Mary Helen Williams and sentenced to death. However, his sentence was reduced to life in prison. Because of the similarities between this case and the Brenda Sue Brown murder, it became a common local belief that Roseboro had killed both of them.

When the case of Brenda Sue Brown was reopened in 2005, detectives visited Roseboro in prison, but he refused to talk about the case.

In February 2010, Roseboro was subpoenaed to a Cleveland County hearing to determine if enough evidence existed in the Brenda Sue Brown murder case to bring a new suspect, Thurman Price, to trial. During his testimony, which lasted less than ten minutes, Roseboro denied killing Brenda Sue. He said he did not know who did it, and had no memory of the day she was murdered. He said, "You're talking about something forty years ago. How would I recall something that long ago?"

== Reopening of Brenda Sue's case ==
In 2005, Brenda Sue Brown's sisters, Patricia Buff and Mary McSwain, spent months asking the Shelby Police Department to reopen her case. Officers told them that the case files were missing.

After four days of searching through files in storage, the files were found in an unmarked box along with the files of the Mary Helen Williams murder case. However, much evidence was missing, including Brenda Sue's dress, underwear, shoes, her powder-puff compact, the rock that was used to kill her, two vials of blood, fingernail scrapings, branches, and a hair sample.

According to police records, Sheriff Allen was the last person in possession of this evidence after he had retrieved it from the State Bureau of Investigation in Raleigh, North Carolina, in August 1966. The only physical evidence still available was a bloody palm print that was taken from Brenda Sue's shoe in 1966.

On May 15, 2006, Brenda Sue's body was exhumed from the Spring Hill Church Road Cemetery in Lillington, North Carolina, and examined for any available evidence. The wooden casket in which she was buried had disintegrated, and only a few bones remained. On May 21, 2006, a public memorial service was held, and Brenda Sue's remains were laid to rest in Sunset Cemetery in Shelby, North Carolina.

== Arrest of Thurman Price in 2007 ==
In the spring of 2006, the Shelby, North Carolina, newspaper, The Shelby Star, ran a 13-part 40th anniversary series about the Brenda Sue Brown murder.

Shortly thereafter, Lori Lail came forward to police and claimed that her grandfather, Earl Mickey Parker, had told her shortly before his death (on June 26, 2002) that he and a man named Thurman Price had killed Brenda Sue.

On February 12, 2007, the Shelby police arrested Thurman Price, 79, on a first-degree murder charge. Price's home is located close to where Brenda Sue's body was found. It is unclear whether Price lived there in July 1966. According to county records, Price did not purchase the house until 1973. He was released from jail on February 16, 2007, on $50,000 bond and denied any involvement in the murder of Brenda Sue.

The indictment indicated that Earl Mickey Parker had described in detail how Brenda Sue was killed and, according to authorities, his confession to his granddaughter is consistent with evidence found at the crime scene in July 1966. According to court records, Lori Lail called the family of Brenda Sue Brown on April 3, 2006, and told Brenda Sue's sister that the killer was Thurman Price but did not mention her grandfather's involvement.

On May 10, 2007, Earl Mickey Parker's body was exhumed from Sunset Cemetery in Shelby to see if his palm print matched the bloody palm print found on Brenda Sue's shoe. The results of this test were inconclusive because the hands of the body were too deteriorated to get a print.

=== Criminal records of Parker and Price ===
In 1954, Parker, 26, and Price, 25, had been indicted together for the rape of Shirley Morrison, a 12-year-old girl, in Patterson Springs, North Carolina. In January 1955, the men pleaded guilty to assault to commit rape. According to court records, Parker and Price were each given a 3-5 year suspended prison sentence, ordered to keep a job, not to drink alcohol, and to pay court costs of $240.

==== Deathbed confession ====
On February 9, 2010, a Cleveland County judge ruled that Earl Mickey Parker's deathbed confession and Lail's testimony would be admitted as evidence at trial. Lori Lail testified at the hearing that in June 2002 her grandfather, Earl Mickey Parker, told her on his deathbed that he and Thurman Price killed Brenda Sue Brown in 1966. Thurman Price maintained his innocence until his death on August 4, 2012, while still awaiting trial.

According to Lail, she was alone with her grandfather in his hospital room at Cleveland Regional Medical Center in Shelby when he told her, "I've done some bad things with my life and before I can move on I need to get them off my chest". Lail recalled the story her grandfather told her:

He walked to a local bootlegger's house the night before, where he met Price and drank for several hours. While walking home the next morning they saw Brenda Sue near South Lafayette Street and they sneaked up behind her with the intention of rape. Lail described how Parker told her that Price had grabbed Brenda Sue and dragged her from the road to where "There was a little black boy playing in a field and Price screamed after him to get home." Supposedly, this was Robert Roseboro. According to Lail's grandfather's account, Brenda Sue fought hard and scratched Price, which made him angry and he picked up a rock and hit her in the face and told Parker that they had to kill her because, "They would go away and do real time this time."

== In the media ==
The Brenda Sue Brown murder mystery has been profiled on several crime shows, including the Oxygen Channel's Captured on November 11, 2007.

== See also ==
- Cold case
- Crime in North Carolina
- List of kidnappings (1960–1969)
- List of murdered American children
- List of solved missing person cases (1950–1969)
