= Kidnapping of Mary Agnes Moroney =

Unsolved kidnapping case

Mary Agnes Moroney
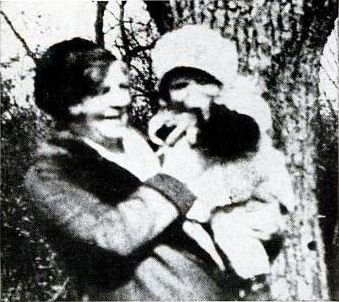
- Mary Agnes Moroney (right) and her mother (left)
- Born: May 10, 1928; Chicago, Illinois, U.S.
- Disappeared: May 15, 1930 (aged 2); Chicago, Illinois, U.S.
- Status: Whereabouts identified on February 17, 2023; 92 years, 9 months, and 2 days after her disappearance
- Died: October 20, 2003 (aged 75); Opa-locka, Florida, U.S.
- Resting place: Our Lady of Mercy Catholic Cemetery; Doral, Florida, U.S.
- Other name: Jeanette Burchard
- Known for: Kidnap victim
- Spouses: Edward Clifton Jennings (m. 1946; div. 1961) Earl Thomas Burchard (m. 1977; died 1989)
- Children: 3
- Parents: Michael Moroney (father); Catherine Moroney (mother)

Mary Agnes Moroney (May 10, 1928 – October 20, 2003) was an American woman who as a child was kidnapped from her home in Chicago, Illinois, on May 15, 1930. The case was heavily covered by both local and national media. Mary Agnes' kidnapping is the oldest case of this nature in the files of the Chicago Missing Persons Bureau.

In 2023, it was announced that DNA tests conducted with the participation of Mary Agnes' surviving family had determined that the girl had been given the name Jeanette Burchard. She later moved to Florida, where she had died in 2003 at the age of 75. Though the results are conclusive, since Burchard's body itself has not been tested, and the perpetrator(s) have not been identified, the case is still officially unsolved.

== Disappearance ==
Mary Agnes Moroney was born in Chicago, Illinois, on May 10, 1928, the first of two daughters to Michael and Catherine Moroney; she had a younger sister named Anastasia, who was eleven months old at the time of the kidnapping. The Moroney family lived in poverty, as Michael only made US$15 per week (about $300 in 2026) passing out handbills. A relative of Catherine's wrote to a welfare agency and a paragraph on their plight was printed. The service did not normally disclose addresses but, through a slip, the family's address–5200 Wentworth Avenue–was learned by a woman.

On May 14, 1930, Mary Agnes' mother answered a knock at her door and was greeted by a woman who claimed to have been sent by a social worker to deal with the Moroneys' case. She was described as well-dressed, about 22 years of age, with protruding teeth and a "cultured" voice. The woman identified herself as "Julia Otis". After Catherine disclosed the family's many problems, the woman asked if she could temporarily take Mary Agnes to California with her, adding that she would be unrecognisable and "fat as a butterball". Catherine refused. After promising to return, the woman handed Catherine US$2 ($40 in 2026) and left.

The next day, the woman came back, this time with baby clothes, as Catherine was pregnant. She stated that she had arranged to get a better job for her husband Michael and offered to take Mary Agnes to a nearby store to buy her some clothes and shoes. Reluctantly, Catherine gave her consent. Later she commented that Mary Agnes sobbed and refused to go with the woman, but was taken anyway. Mary Agnes and the unidentified woman never returned.

== Letters ==
=== First letter ===
The Moroney family received a letter from "Julia Otis" the day after she took Mary Agnes. It read:

Please don't be alarmed, I have taken your little girl to California with me. I have hired a special nurse to care for her. We'll be back in two months. By that time you will be on your feet again and will be able to care for her. She didn't even cry a bit. She is outfitted like a princess. In the meantime, I'll help all I can to get you on your feet. Don't worry about her or anything else. When you get this letter we'll be on our way already. As ever, Julia Otis

This was the last the Moroneys ever heard from "Julia Otis".

=== Second letter ===
Two weeks after the kidnapping, a woman who identified herself as "Alice Henderson" sent the Moroneys a letter in which she stated that "Otis" was her cousin and that she was "love hungry" because her own husband and baby had died the year before. Henderson never wrote again and authorities state that the letter from "Otis" was written in the same handwriting as the one written by "Henderson".

== Alleged findings ==
=== Martha Thompson ===
In July 1931, an elder Native American woman named Martha Thompson was found pushing a cart to join a circus. The cart contained a blond-haired, blue-eyed three-year-old girl that matched Mary Agnes' description. Thompson maintained that the girl was abandoned by her mother, Florence Fuller, and begged to be allowed to keep her. The Moroneys did not identify the girl as Mary Agnes.

=== Mary McClelland ===
In 1952, a 24-year-old housewife called Mary McClelland (née Beck) came forward, claiming that, by looking at photos of Mary Agnes' siblings (six more were born after her kidnapping) she suspected she was the missing girl. McClelland had been adopted within a year of the kidnapping by Charles and Nora Beck. Dr. Kraus, after studying and comparing her dental casts, named her as one of the family. McClelland's skull and blood showed she was a Moroney and her mother claimed to recognize her. An aging physician named Dr. E. W. Merrithew, however, stated that he delivered McClelland to an unknown mother on November 17, 1927, and that her mother provided a baby picture of her daughter dating from 1928, which proved she had been adopted two years before the kidnapping. Furthermore, Mary Agnes underwent an operation for a ruptured navel, but McClelland did not have the scar Mary Agnes had at the time of her disappearance. Further DNA testing proved she was not Mary Agnes. She died in 2005. A DNA test performed in 2008, following McClelland's death, conclusively determined that she was not Mary Agnes.

== 2023 Developments ==
In February 2023, it was announced that DNA testing had determined a link between Mary Agnes's surviving family and relatives of Jeanette Burchard, a Florida resident who had died in 2003 at the age of 75. Though Mary Agnes's adoptive mother, Jeanette Celarek Derris Anderson, has not been formally accused, Mary Agnes's daughter, Terri Arnold, said she has her suspicions about Anderson being the perpetrator of the kidnapping, and has felt "anger" towards her since her mother's identification.

== See also ==
- Paul Fronczak triple disappearance
- List of kidnappings
- Lists of people who disappeared
