= Wyoming Correctional Facility =

Medium-security state prison for male prisoners, located in New York, US

Coordinates: 42°50′58″N 78°15′52″W

- Interactive map of Wyoming Correctional Facility
- Location: 3203 Dunbar Road Attica, New York
- Status: open
- Security class: medium
- Capacity: 1722
- Opened: 1984
- Managed by: New York State Department of Corrections and Community Supervision
- Warden: Thomas J. Sticht (2022)

Wyoming Correctional Facility is a medium-security state men's prison in Town of Attica, Wyoming County, New York. The prison is located adjacent to the better-known maximum security Attica Correctional Facility. The Wyoming prison first opened in 1984. As of 2010 Wyoming had a working capacity of 1722 inmates.

The Wyoming prison was constructed in response to the notorious Attica Prison riot, which took place in September 1971 at the now adjacent Attica prison, thirteen years prior to the construction of the Wyoming prison. All but four of the 43 men who died in the Attica event, including 10 hostages, were killed by law enforcement gunfire.

== Notable inmates ==
- Richard Delage - serving a life term for shooting and killing a schoolteacher in Mount Kisco in 1960. At the time of the crime, he was only 15 years old. Transferred from Bare Hill Correctional Facility following its March 2026 closure.
