= Disappearance of Patricia Spencer and Pamela Hobley =

Two American teenagers who went missing on Halloween in 1969

Patricia Spencer
- Picture of Spencer and age progression (right) to indicate her appearance at age 59
- Born: Patricia Ann Spencer; January 10, 1953
- Disappeared: October 31, 1969 (aged 16); Oscoda, Iosco County, Michigan, U.S.
- Status: Missing for 56 years, 8 months and 10 days
- Height: 5 ft 4 in (1.63 m)

Pamela Hobley
- Picture of Hobley and age progression (right) to indicate her appearance at age 57
- Born: Pamela Sue Hobley; May 24, 1954
- Disappeared: October 31, 1969 (aged 15); Oscoda, Iosco County, Michigan, U.S.
- Status: Missing for 56 years, 8 months and 10 days
- Height: 5 ft 7 in (1.70 m)

Patricia Ann Spencer (born January 10, 1953) and Pamela Sue Hobley (born May 24, 1954) were two American teenagers who went missing on Halloween, Friday, October 31, 1969, in Oscoda, Iosco County, Michigan, after presumably committing truancy together, as they had both been seen walking in each other's company shortly before. The pair were aged 16 and 15, respectively, and "were not considered friends" at the time they disappeared. Their bodies were never recovered, yet authorities believe that both of their lives had ended with homicide.

== Backgrounds ==
=== Patricia Spencer ===
Patricia Ann "Patty" Spencer was 16 at the time she went missing, born on January 10, 1953. She was estimated to be between 5 feet 3 inches and 5 feet 4 inches tall and weighed between 120 and 145 pounds. Her eyes were blue, her hair was brownish-blond, and she wore glasses, although she did not have them on October 31. When last seen, she wore a brown pullover with a matching skirt and a pair of high-heeled shoes. A jacket with a "gray and green plaid" design and a necklace decorated with a peace sign was also in her possession. She had at least one known scar, due to a dog attack on one of her legs.

=== Pamela Hobley ===
Pamela Sue "Pam" Hobley was fifteen and was born on May 24, 1954. Her hair and eyes were brown, and she was between 5 feet 6 inches and 5 feet 8 inches tall and weighed about 110 to 115 pounds. She had "distinctive marks," namely two scars, one near her nose and the other by her mouth, although some sources state the latter was a birthmark. Hobley wore a white imitation fur coat edged with brown, a plaid skirt, a shirt of an unspecified color, high-heeled shoes, and white socks. It is known that Hobley had been engaged in activities of which her family did not approve. Rumors also have circulated that she, along with Spencer, may have "experimented with drugs and alcohol." Hobley had apparently accepted a marriage proposal prior to her disappearance.

== Disappearance ==
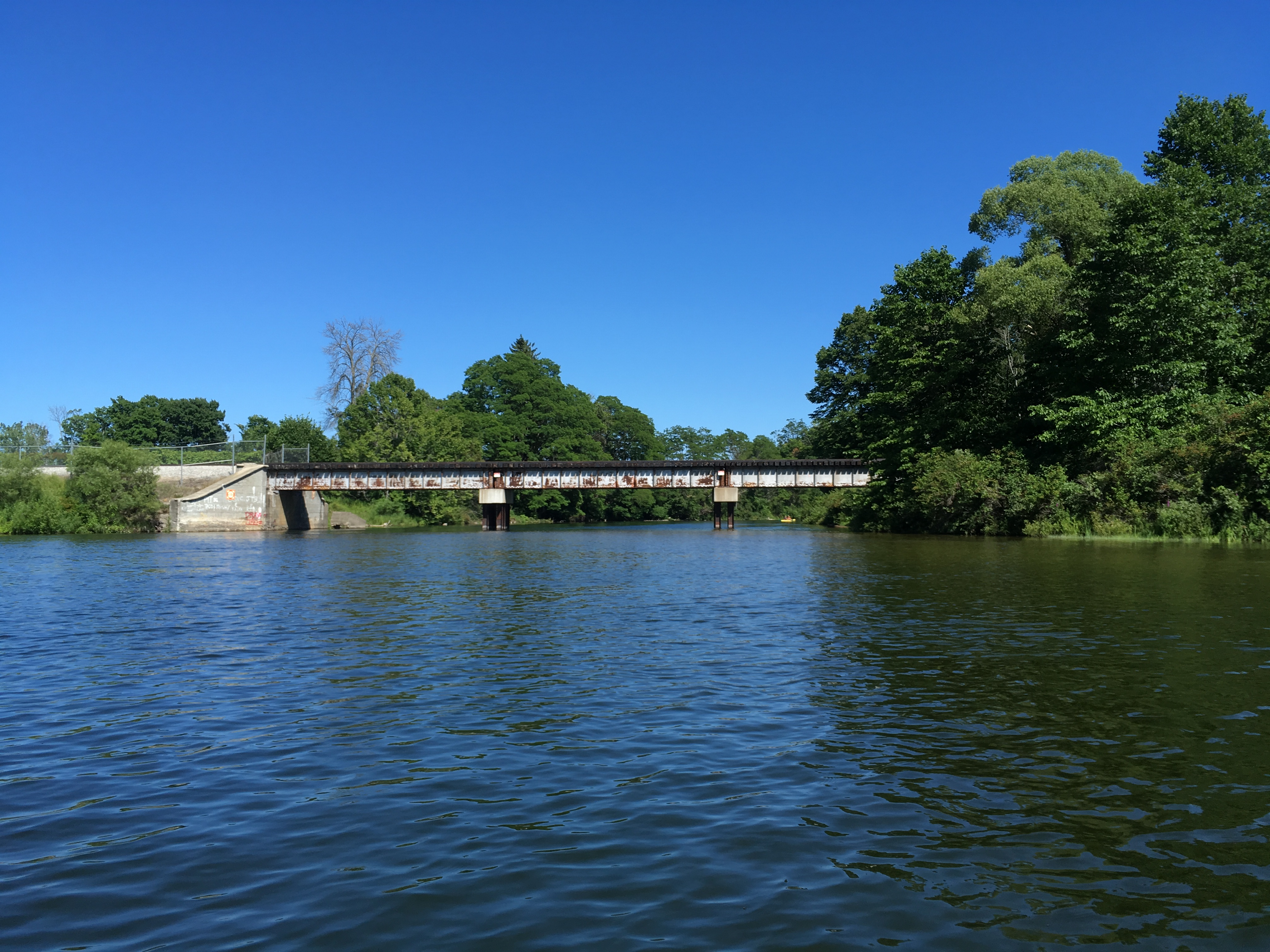
LSRC Bridge over Au Sable River, Oscoda near Oscoda high school and River Road where the girls were last seen

Hobley told her mother and three sisters that she planned to return home after attending her high school's homecoming football game and a Halloween party. When she was absent after her family returned from trick-or-treating, her fiancé informed her mother that she had not arrived at the party. Hobley's mother then called other parents and learned that Spencer never arrived at the party either. Eventually, their absence became a missing person investigation and police requested information from the community for assistance in discovering their whereabouts. For the first week of the investigation it was speculated that they were runaways with the intent to travel to Flint, Michigan.

Hobley's sister, Mary Buehrle, later expressed her doubts that this was a case of such nature, citing the positive events that had taken place in the time before the girls went missing. Both girls were reportedly "close to their families" and did not bring their purses, identification or extra clothing when they left, indicating that they did not disappear voluntarily.

== Investigation ==
Initial reports stated the girls were last seen walking together away from Oscoda High School. However, a witness later stated that he picked them up as they were walking along River Road, and dropped them off in downtown Oscoda. Police cite further undisclosed information to indicate the girls were downtown that day. Investigators suspect that the girls continued hitchhiking and were abducted by "two or more" assailants and eventually murdered, though very few leads were ever uncovered, leading to a cold case. A link to the unidentified Oakland County Child Killer has been explored, though this seems unlikely. Hobley's family posted a $1,000 reward for any information to locate Pamela or to bring any possible murderer to police custody.

In 1985, police were told that the two were murdered by "two area men" and buried near a barn, noted to be a popular location for teenage parties. Decades later, the local chief of police directed an investigation of this suggestion and a search of the area, with aid of cadaver dogs, which turned up no detectable evidence that human remains were at the scene. It is unknown if the man that owned the property at the time has been considered a person of interest. Other places that were known to be frequented by teenagers were also searched to no avail.

A man, now deceased, claimed to have transported Hobley and Spencer on the day they disappeared, yet this particular lead is no longer considered credible. A different individual later told police he had given the girls a ride to a gas station not far from where they were last seen. He claimed he had been questioned in the past about this issue, yet this was allegedly never recorded for future investigation, and is now believed to be the last time both subjects were seen.

=== Recent efforts ===
Mary Buehrle has continued to show support for the case, most notably at a state event known as Missing in Michigan, where family members of missing Michigan residents rally alongside law enforcement and share details of such cases. The pair have both been entered into national databases, such as the National Center for Missing & Exploited Children, the NamUs and The Doe Network to gain awareness, tips and the latter, possible matches with unidentified individuals. The National Center for Missing & Exploited Children used a technique known as age progression to illustrate an estimated likeness of how the pair could look if they were still alive, Spencer's showing a target age of sixty and Hobley's at fifty-seven.

Hobley's dental charting and both subjects' DNA profiles were obtained and were used to compare against unidentified decedents. Neither of the girls have fingerprints on file, and Spencer's dental records are also unavailable. As they neglected to carry any form of identification, physical data such as dental records and DNA would be needed to identify their bodies, if they were to be found. A new detective was assigned to the case in 2010 and proceeded to interview witnesses again in hopes to uncover new information about the case. In 2013, police released a statement indicating they had a person of interest in the case, but they still needed additional information for the case to continue.

Roni Collins of Flint, Michigan, was a person of interest in the murders, as he was in the Oscoda area the same night and drove a white van. According to authorities, Spencer and Hobley were seen speaking to someone in a van shortly before their disappearances. In January 2026, Collins committed suicide as police were closing in on him for the murder of another teenager, Sheri Jo Elliott, in Flint in 1983.

== See also ==
- List of kidnappings (1960–1969)
- List of people who disappeared mysteriously (1910–1970)
