= Paul Fronczak triple disappearance =

1964 kidnapping and 1965 disappearances

- Location: Chicago, Illinois, U.S. (abduction of Fronczak); Newark, New Jersey, U.S. (abandonment of Jack Rosenthal)
- Date: April 27, 1964 (abduction of Fronczak) c. July 1965 (disappearance of the Rosenthals)
- Attack type: Child abduction, child abandonment, disappearance
- Victims: Paul Joseph Fronczak (missing for 55 years; found as Kevin Ray Baty in 2019); Jack Rosenthal (missing for 50 years; found as Paul Fronczak in 2015); Jill Rosenthal (missing for 61 years)
- Perpetrator: Unknown
- Motive: Unknown
- Accused: Gilbert and Marie Rosenthal

On April 27, 1964, a one-day old infant, Paul Joseph Fronczak, was kidnapped from Michael Reese Hospital in Chicago, Illinois. A woman dressed as a nurse had entered the hospital room of Dora Fronczak and told her the doctor needed to examine the baby; Dora handed the baby to the unknown woman, who left the hospital with the baby and never returned.

Two years later, the FBI told the baby's parents that they believed they had found Paul in New Jersey. The parents met the New Jersey child and said it was their child, and the child was raised as Paul Fronczak. Paul Fronczak doubted his identity as both a child and an adult, and after taking a DNA test in 2012, discovered that he was not related to the couple who raised him, Dora and Chester Fronczak. In 2015, he was identified as Jack Rosenthal, who had disappeared in 1965. Additionally, he had a twin sister named Jill Rosenthal who also disappeared. The original 1964 kidnapping victim was found alive in Michigan in 2019, now named Kevin Ray Baty. Baty died from cancer in 2020.

The woman who kidnapped the baby has never been identified. Jill Rosenthal has never been located, but Paul Fronczak believes that their parents, Gilbert and Marie Rosenthal, may have killed Jill around the same time they abandoned him, as witnesses told Paul Fronczak that he and Jill had been abused as children. However, Fronczak and investigators believe there is still a solid possibility that Jill is still alive.

The 2021 documentary The Lost Sons showed Paul Fronczak exploring details of his case.

== Kidnapping of Paul Fronczak ==
Baby Paul Joseph Fronczak was born on April 26, 1964, at Michael Reese Hospital. One day later, a woman dressed as a nurse entered the room of Dora Fronczak, baby Paul's mother, and told her that the doctor wanted baby Paul examined. Dora handed baby Paul to the unknown woman, and the woman left the hospital with baby Paul and was never seen again. The investigation was the largest manhunt in Chicago history up to that point, involving 175,000 postal workers, 200 police officers, and the FBI. Six hundred homes were searched by midnight that night, but there was no trace of baby Paul.

== Abandonment of Jack Rosenthal ==
On July 2, 1965, a male toddler, later known to be Jack Rosenthal, was found abandoned in a pushchair in a busy shopping center in Newark, New Jersey. Law enforcement expected the case to be solved quickly, but no one came forward to claim the toddler. He was then put into foster care, and given the name Scott McKinley. FBI later notified the Fronczaks and said that they believed Scott McKinley might be baby Paul Fronczak, as McKinley was the only child they reviewed whom they could not fully rule out as baby Paul. The Fronczaks traveled to New Jersey, and said that McKinley was baby Paul. McKinley was later adopted and raised as Paul Joseph Fronczak. Today, it is generally believed that Jack Rosenthal was abandoned by his parents, Gilbert and Marie Rosenthal.

== Later developments ==
When Paul Fronczak was 10, he entered the crawlspace in his home looking for Christmas presents, and instead found newspaper clippings about the kidnapping of baby Paul. He brought the newspapers to his mother, who scolded him and said, "Yes, you were kidnapped, we found you, we love you, and that's all you need to know." Fronczak said that since then he had always wondered if he was actually his parents' child. He did not bring the subject up to his parents for almost 40 years. In 2012, Fronczak decided to take an IdentiGEN DNA test. He asked his parents, and they were surprised, but agreed and met him in Chicago so they could take DNA samples together. Their meeting ended and Paul returned home to Las Vegas, then his parents changed their minds and told him by phone that they did not want him to send in the DNA kit. After struggling with the decision, Fronczak decided he would send in the samples anyway. He later received a phone call from IdentiGEN, and the caller told him there was "no remote possibility" that he was his parents' biological child.

=== Identification as Jack Rosenthal ===
Fronczak then wanted to find out his true identity, and also wanted to find out what happened to baby Paul. A group of genealogist volunteers called the DNA Detectives offered to take up his case in 2013. On June 3, 2015, the group told Fronczak that they had identified him as Jack Rosenthal of Atlantic City, New Jersey, who had seemingly vanished in 1965. They informed him that he also had a twin sister who had disappeared named Jill. Fronczak later met biological relatives, some of whom informed him that they had seen him and Jill as children, and suddenly stopped seeing them, and that his biological parents, Gilbert and Marie Rosenthal would come up with excuses as to why the twins would no longer be there at family meetings. Biological family members also recalled that they had seen Jack and Jill badly abused and neglected, and one family member said they witnessed Jack and Jill sitting "in a cage". Gilbert was described as "an angry man" after returning from the Korean War with PTSD, and Marie was described as a heavy alcoholic. Susan Wohlert, who had babysat the Rosenthals' older children, later told Fronczak that when she had babysat, Gilbert and Marie Rosenthal had told her "not to bother" with the twins upstairs. She went upstairs out of curiosity, where she found Jack and Jill in a room which was empty besides them in their cribs. She said that Jack had a black eye, that he and Jill were dirty, and that the room reeked of urine because their sheets had not been changed. She spent the whole night with Jack and Jill, and Gilbert and Marie were furious the next morning when they found her in Jack and Jill's room. Wohlert stated that she got the impression that Gilbert and Marie had been partying and that they smelled like alcohol. Gilbert and Marie both died in the 1990s from cancer.

Fronczak said that he believes Jill may have been killed or "something tragic" may have happened to her, and that his parents then decided to get rid of him because "they couldn't explain just one twin". He said, however, that he believes Jill could still be alive, and the National Center for Missing & Exploited Children created a composite reconstruction image of what Jill may look like if she is still alive. No pictures of Jill as a child are known to exist. The investigation into her disappearance is ongoing.

=== Discovery of baby Paul ===
In 2019, a Michigan man named Kevin Ray Baty was identified as the baby Paul Fronczak who had been kidnapped from a Chicago hospital in 1964, though his identity was not revealed to the public until 2020, when Baty died of cancer on his 56th birthday. Before his death, he spoke multiple times on the phone with his biological mother, Dora Fronczak, but they were never able to meet in person. Baty had been raised by Lorraine Fountain, who had been dating a doctor from Chicago when she suddenly moved to Arkansas for a year and then returned with baby Paul, who was raised as Kevin Baty. Fountain died in 2004. It is unclear how Kevin got the last name Baty. The perpetrator of his kidnapping has not been identified to this day. The FBI investigation into the kidnapping remains open.

== See also ==
- Kidnapping of Mary Agnes Moroney
- List of kidnappings (1960–1969)
- List of people who disappeared
- List of solved missing person cases (1950–1969)
- Disappearance of Bobby Dunbar
