= Attica Central School District =

School district in New York, United States

Address
- 3338 East Main Street Attica, New York, 14011; United States
- Coordinates: 42°51′38″N 78°15′41″W

Students and staff
- District mascot: Attica Blue Devil

Other information
- Website: www.atticacsd.org

Attica Central School District is in the town of Attica, New York which has a population of 7,000. This school has around 120 students in a graduating class each year.

School hours are from 8:20 a.m. to 3:10 p.m. in the high school and 8:10 a.m. to 3:00 p.m. in the elementary schools.

== Facilities ==
Attica Central School District facilities
School	Phone Number	Address	Principal	Assistant Principal
Prospect Elementary	585-591-0400	31 Prospect St. Attica, NY 14011	Sherri Bennett	none
Attica Middle School	585-591-0400	3338 East Main St. Attica, NY 14011	Paul Clark	none
Attica High School	585-591-0400	3338 East Main St. Attica, NY 14011	Josh Audsley	John Spink

== Sports ==
Attica's Athletic Department participates in softball, baseball, football, soccer, cross country, track and field, volleyball, tennis, basketball, swimming, cheerleading, golf, and hockey (merged with Notre Dame). Sports schedules are posted on atticacsd.org. The school's mascot is the Attica Blue Devil.

== Classes and extra-curricular activities ==
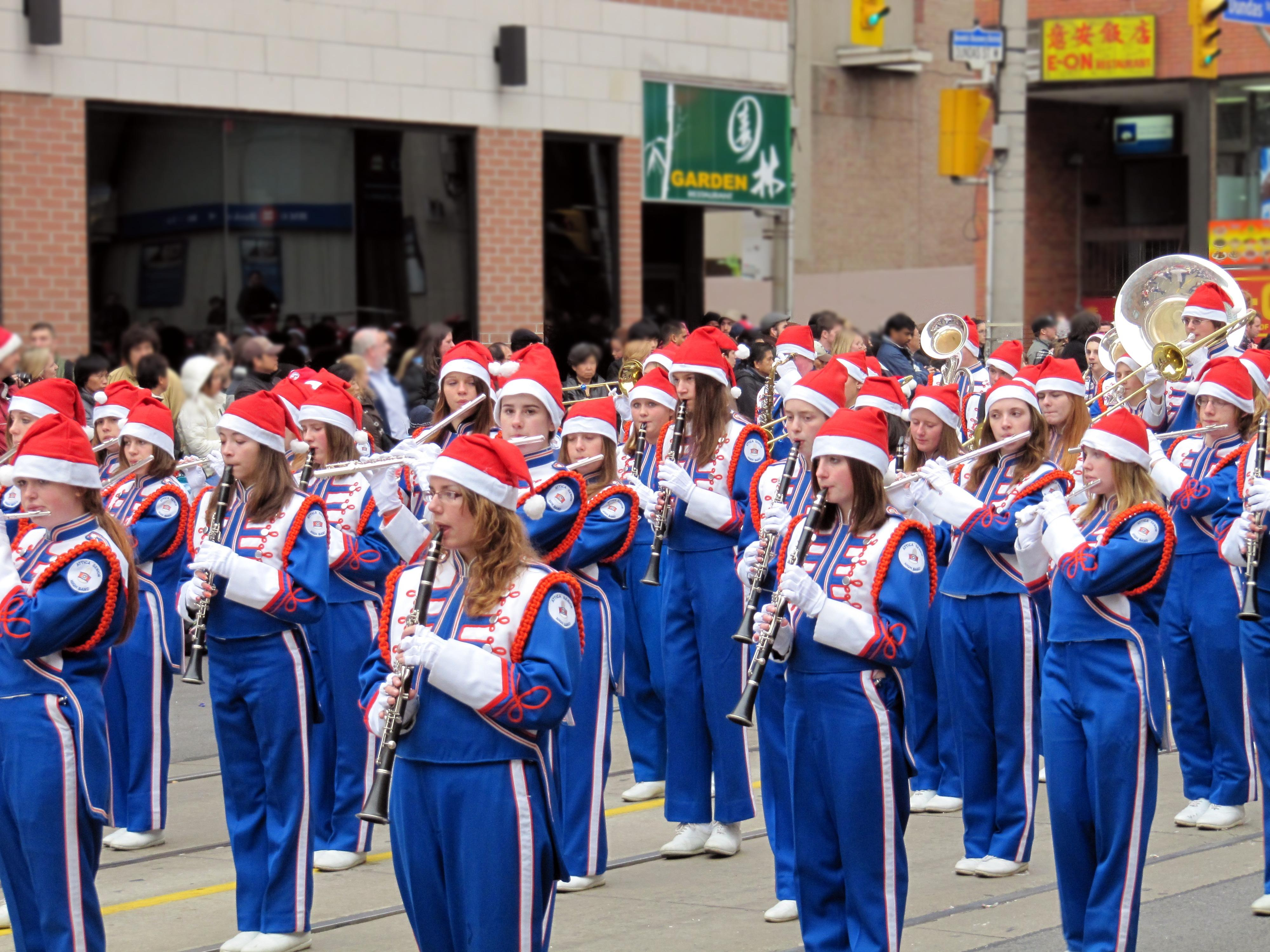
Attica Senior High Band at the 2009 Toronto Santa Claus Parade

Band: The Attica High school band consists of a variety of musical instruments, and makes numerous trips. The band has been to Tampa Bay, Florida, Orlando, Florida, Toronto, Ontario, Canada, Pasadena, California, and Washington, D.C. The band performs throughout Wyoming County parades and fairs. They have won numerous awards, from local parades to national televised parades, for over forty-five years.

Foreign languages: Spanish classes begin in 7th grade and can be practiced until 12th grade. One credit is given for a two-year class of Spanish in 7th and 8th grade. For every year of Spanish in high school, one credit is received. French is no longer a language to study.

Art: Art classes begin in kindergarten and can be taken until 12th grade.

Home economics: Home economics is taken in 7th grade and lasts for two quarters; the other two quarters for a 7th grader would be in health. Learning to cook is the main goal but sewing and basics are taught as well.

Health: Health is a required credit and is taken in 10th grade. It is a full year course and one credit is earned after completing the class.

Technology: In 8th grade technology education is provided and is an all year course. The maximum credit is one; in class there are many hands-on activities such as creating bridges and testing their strength, creating bottle rockets, shelf crafting, and creating and racing wooden cars.

Ed Foundations: In 9th grade, "Ed Foundations" is taught to the students, which includes computer system operation and alcohol and drug awareness. One credit is given and it is a full year course.
