= Cannock Chase murders =

1960s murder of three girls in Cannock Chase, England

- Margaret Reynolds (left), Diana Tift (centre) and Christine Darby (right)
- Other names: The A34 murders Babes in the Ditch murders The Half-Day murders
- Motive: Child sexual abuse Rape

Details
- Victims: 1 (convicted); 2 (alleged)
- Span of crimes: 8 September 1965 – 19 August 1967
- Country: United Kingdom
- Locations: Staffordshire, England
- Date apprehended: 15 November 1968

The Cannock Chase murders (also known as the A34 murders, the Babes in the Ditch murders and the Half-Day murders) were the murders of three girls aged between five and seven in Staffordshire, England, between 1965 and 1967. The bodies of all three children were discovered on Cannock Chase, a vast area of countryside in the county of Staffordshire.

Raymond Leslie Morris was arrested for the attempted abduction of an intended fourth victim on 15 November 1968. He was convicted in February 1969 of the 1967 murder of seven-year-old Christine Ann Darby at Stafford Assizes. Although never charged with the murders of the first two victims discovered on Cannock Chase, following Morris's conviction, a police spokesman informed the media all investigators involved in his apprehension remained convinced that all three children had been murdered by Morris, who is also believed to be responsible for the abduction, sexual assault, and attempted murder of a fifth girl in 1964.

The manhunt to identify and apprehend Morris is reported to be one of the largest initiated to apprehend a child killer in British history. He died of natural causes at HMP Preston on 11 March 2014.

== Abductions ==
=== Julia Taylor ===
At 9 p.m. on 2 December 1964, a nine-year-old named Julia Taylor was lured into a blue Vauxhall Velox in Bloxwich by a man claiming to be a friend of her mother and referring to himself as "Uncle Len". The child was informed her mother had asked this individual to transport her to her aunt's home to "fetch Christmas presents". She was driven to a pile of slag heaps near the mining village of Bentley where she was sexually assaulted, manually strangled and thrown half-naked from the car into a ditch, having endured grievous internal injuries. Taylor was found alive by a passing cyclist approximately fifty minutes later. This individual would later state he had overheard "weak, sobbing" noises as he cycled in the pouring rain and darkness and had stopped his bicycle to investigate the sounds; he immediately flagged down a passing van, which drove the sobbing and bleeding child to a hospital.

Had the cyclist not overheard, and then observed the child in this ditch, she likely would have died from exposure within twenty minutes.

Taylor could remember little about her ordeal, her abductor or his vehicle beyond sobbing and begging her abductor to drive her home when she noticed he had driven past her aunt's home and his conversation suddenly became more lurid in nature. However, one eyewitnesses to Taylor's abduction was certain the abductor's vehicle was a large car with two-tone paint, small fins at the rear and a hand spot-lamp mounted close to one wing "at the end of the windscreen, near the driver's door". Despite intense efforts to locate this car, the vehicle was not traced.

Police composite photograph of Margaret Reynolds, depicting the child wearing the clothing as her abductor saw her

=== Margaret Reynolds ===
On the afternoon of Wednesday 8 September 1965, a six-year-old girl, Margaret Reynolds, disappeared from a location close to her home on Clifton Road, Aston as she walked the short distance from her home to the Prince Albert Primary School. She was last seen alive by her older sister, Susan, when the two parted company to walk in separate directions to their respective schools, having returned to their home for lunch. When the child failed to return home from school, her parents quickly learned she had not attended any classes that afternoon. The Reynolds immediately reported their daughter missing to police.

In the weeks following Reynolds' disappearance, 160 police officers questioned over 25,000 individuals in and around Aston. Two hundred posters featuring a composite photograph of the child in the clothes she was last seen, with an accompanying appeal for witnesses to contact police were printed by the Birmingham Evening Mail. These posters were distributed in and around Aston, Lozells and Handsworth. With assistance from members of the public, investigators extensively searched all houses and landmarks within an eight-mile radius of where Reynolds was last seen alive. Despite these efforts, no trace of the child was discovered.

In the months prior to Reynolds' abduction, investigators in and around the vicinity of her disappearance had received numerous reports of a lone white male in a car who had attempted to entice prepubescent girls into his vehicle and who, if successful, had sexually assaulted the children, with his assaults often including digital penetration.

=== Diana Tift ===
Three months later, on 30 December, a five-year-old girl named Diana Joy Tift disappeared from a street close to her Walsall home. The child was last seen at 2 p.m. outside her grandmother's home on Chapel Street, walking to her own home in nearby Hollemeadow Avenue, Blakenall Heath. She was carrying a pink plastic handbag with a white plastic strap she had received as a Christmas present. The last potential sighting of Tift was made by a family member, who believed she had subsequently seen her walking past a nearby launderette en route to the family home.

Tift was reported missing by her parents at 7 p.m. As had earlier been the case with Margaret Reynolds, despite extensive searches, no trace of the child was discovered. Tift's disappearance saw approximately 2,000 people search for her. A local councillor also offered a reward for the child's safe return.

By 2 January 1966, more than 500 officers from across the West Midlands region had been assigned to the manhunt to locate Tift. Several senior officers had also tentatively linked her disappearance to that of Margaret Reynolds. Over 6,000 homes, gardens and outhouses in and around Bloxwich were searched by 5 January. Ponds and reservoirs were also searched by underwater units. Other officers searched derelict factories and warehouses, to no avail.

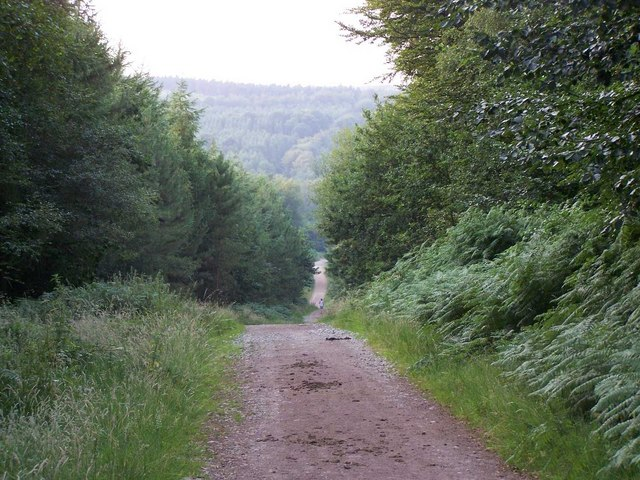
Cannock Chase. The bodies of Margaret Reynolds and Diana Tift were discovered at this location on 12 January 1966.

== Initial discoveries ==
On the afternoon of 12 January 1966, the body of Diana Tift was found by a man hunting rabbits. She lay half-concealed in undergrowth aside a water-logged ditch at Mansty Gulley on Cannock Chase in Staffordshire, between the villages of Penkridge and Littleton. This location was a seldom-used farm track just half a mile from the A34. (Note: In the 1960s, the A34 was a major trunk road two hundred miles in length extending from Southampton to Manchester via locations such as Berkshire, Cannock Chase, Walsall, and Cheshire.) A post-mortem revealed the child had been raped, then suffocated with the pixie hood of her anorak as her murderer had pressed upon her nose and mouth.

The naked body of Margaret Reynolds lay just inches away. Her body was severely decomposed, and none of her clothing was ever recovered save for one shoe. As such, pathologists were unable to determine her cause of death. Aside from traces of semen found upon and within Tift's body, no forensic evidence was recovered from the crime scene.

Prior to the discovery of the children's bodies, police had concluded their abductions were linked. The modus operandi of Taylor's 1964 abduction and body disposal also led investigators to strongly link her abduction and attempted murder to the same perpetrator. At a press conference held on 14 January, the Assistant Chief Constable of Staffordshire Police, Thomas Lockley, informed the media: "We are hunting a dangerous child killer who may strike again."

=== Investigation ===
Following the discovery of the children's bodies, investigators contacted Scotland Yard, seeking the assistance of experienced investigators. Two individuals from the Yard's Murder Squad were dispatched to Staffordshire to assist in the investigation, which saw a task force dedicated to the apprehension of the suspect work fourteen hours a day, seven days a week. An index card filing system implemented to cross-check information gradually expanded to number in the scores of thousands. Numerous vehicles sighted on Mansty Gulley between 30 December and 12 January were traced, their owners interviewed, and subsequently eliminated from the enquiry following the verification of their whereabouts on crucial dates. The individual who had discovered the children's bodies—a poacher with a known history of violence—was also eliminated as a suspect.

Despite painstaking groundwork efforts over the following months—including extensive house-to-house enquiries—police failed to identify the perpetrator, although several unrelated offences involving the abduction, attempted abduction or sexual assault of young girls were solved as a result of the investigation. The August 1966 abduction of a 10-year-old girl named Jane Taylor, who disappeared from the Cheshire village of Mobberley while riding her bicycle, was also tentatively linked to the same perpetrator, as investigators could not discount the possibility her disappearance was linked to what were colloquially known as the "A34 murders". (Note: Taylor's murder was subsequently proven to have been committed by a criminal named William Copeland. Her body was found buried in a field in Llanfairfechan in February 1972.)

By the summer of 1967, no further clues of any substance existed for police to pursue, and the investigation into the children's murders had largely become cold.

=== Police strategy ===
Although unable to identify the children's murderer, investigators felt certain the perpetrator would strike again. In preparation, the head of Staffordshire CID, Detective Chief Superintendent Harry Bailey, devised plans to seal the immediate locality of any future child abduction occurring in and around the vicinity of Walsall and to further cordon all minor and major exits further afield from the radius of the abduction by setting up roadblocks. These plans were to be initiated within twenty minutes of any reported child abduction, with other officers to be deployed upon all major approaches to the perimeter of Cannock Chase. Three neighbouring police forces were also notified of this plan, with officers from their forces instructed of their required duties upon receipt of notification of a simple code word: Stop Plan.

== Christine Darby ==
At 2:30 p.m. on 19 August 1967, a seven-year-old named Christine Darby was lured into a grey car as she played with friends near her home in Camden Street, Caldmore, Walsall. The individual had asked Darby and her two friends if they knew the directions to Caldmore Green. When the children pointed the direction to this individual, adding his intended destination was just a short distance up the road, he had feigned confusion and asked Christine to enter the car and show him the way, promising to drive her back to her friends immediately afterwards. The child—whose mother did not own a car—entered the vehicle excitedly. Her friends then observed the vehicle reverse, then drive at speed in the opposite direction to Caldmore Green—the direction of Cannock Chase.

The witnesses to Darby's abduction immediately ran to Darby's home to report the incident to her mother; she in turn almost immediately ran to a payphone and notified the police. (Note: According to police records, Darby's mother notified police of her daughter's abduction twenty-two minutes after the incident.) With assistance from neighbouring police forces, the devised plan to install roadblocks at all minor and major roads exiting Walsall and further afield was immediately implemented.

Questioned by police, the witnesses to Darby's abduction explained the man had been white, in his mid-thirties, clean-shaven and with dark brown hair. He wore a white shirt and drove a grey car—possibly an A55 or A60 "Farina" model Austin Cambridge or a Morris Oxford—and spoke in a notable local accent. One of the children in particular, seven-year-old Nicholas Baldry, remained adamant the man had pronounced Caldmore Green as "Carmer Green" and not "Cold-moor Green", as only a local individual would. (Note: In Walsall, the phonetic pronunciation of the district of Caldmore Green is "Carmer Green"; the vernacular the abductor had used. Individuals from towns less than twenty miles away did not pronounce this location in a local dialect.) This information further reaffirmed the police view they were hunting a local man. As such, police concentrated their manhunt for the perpetrator in and around the Borough of Walsall.

=== Second manhunt ===
Over the following days, 24,000 flyers bearing Darby's photograph were distributed to the public and displayed in prominent locations such as shop windows, bus stops and telephone poles in and around the West Midlands. Each circular bore the inscription "Christine Darby. Were you in Cannock Chase last Saturday afternoon? If so, tell police." One eyewitness reported to police he had seen a grey car travelling in the direction of Cannock Chase shortly after 2:30 p.m. on 19 August. According to this witness, a dark-haired girl had been sitting in the passenger seat.

By the early hours of 20 August, police had initiated a thorough search of Cannock Chase for the body of Christine Darby. As approximately thirty per cent of the eighty-five square mile surface of Cannock Chase was covered by fir trees, dense foliage, mine shafts, clay pits and fox holes, any aerial search of the terrain would be ineffective. As such, over three hundred police began searching Cannock Chase on foot, with the operation beginning at a pool close to Mansty Gulley. These officers were soon assisted by over two hundred officers from two neighbouring forces and two-hundred-and-fifty soldiers of the nearby Staffordshire Regiment. Within hours, a pair of soiled child's knickers were discovered snagged against the branch of a fallen tree. A child's plimsoll was discovered among fern leaves three miles north of this location in the early hours of the following day.

=== Third discovery ===
On the afternoon of 22 August, a soldier named Michael Blundred, searching a cluster of trees within an area of Cannock Chase known to the Forestry Commission as Plantation 110 discovered the child's sprawled, naked body partially concealed by broken fern branches. This individual immediately raised his right hand and called for his colleagues to halt the search.

Darby lay on her back on a small ridge between two rows of fir trees. She was naked from the waist down, with her arms outstretched, her legs parted and her knees raised. Blood had stained the grass and pine needles beneath her body, indicating the child had been sexually assaulted where she lay. Signs of petechial haemorrhage about Darby's face and neck and the fact her tongue protruded slightly beyond the tooth margin indicated she had died of suffocation. Darby's black trousers lay a matter of yards away. The location of her discovery was only a mile from where the bodies of Reynolds and Tift had been discovered the previous year. All three children had lived within a seventeen-mile radius of each other and a short distance from the A34 road.

An analysis of the larvae within the child's nostrils indicated death had occurred two or three days prior to the discovery of her body. A detailed examination of the crime scene itself on the morning of 23 August revealed fragmented tyre tracks determined to have been made by a family-sized saloon car close to where Darby's body had been discovered. (Note: The afternoon of 19 August had seen intermittent showers in and around Walsall.) These tyre impressions extended 140 yards from the open heath into the plantation where the child's body was discovered and clearly indicated Darby's murderer had driven into the plantation, then later reversed some distance from the location with very little deviation from the impressions made upon entry, prior to performing a U-turn, suggesting to a technical manager of the British branch of the Pirelli Tyre Company called to assist in the investigation the driver was "one of considerable skill and experience".

== Second murder investigation ==
The renewed manhunt for the Cannock Chase murderer was led by Assistant Chief Constable Sir Stanley Bailey. Prior to the discovery of Darby's body, investigators from Scotland Yard's Murder Squad were again contacted to assist in the investigation. Two representatives—Detective Superintendent Ian Forbes and Detective Sergeant Thomas Parry—arrived in Stafford on the afternoon of 22 August.

Via a process of elimination, investigators began the task of identifying and eliminating all individuals and vehicles sighted on Cannock Chase on the afternoon in question from the enquiry. Over the following months, the owners of over 600 vehicles observed to be upon Cannock Chase on the date in question were traced and eliminated from the enquiry. (Note: Only one vehicle known to have been on Cannock Chase on 19 August was never traced. This vehicle was not the one driven by Darby's abductor.)

Two individuals who had been on Cannock Chase on the afternoon of 19 August reported to investigators they remembered seeing a grey vehicle parked close to the location where the child's body was discovered. The vehicle in question had been driven by a white male with dark hair. One of these witnesses, Victor Whitehouse, gave a detailed description of the man, whom he had observed leaning on the door of a vehicle he believed to be a "Farina" model Cambridge or Oxford saloon parked where police had found the vehicle's tyre tracks. Whitehouse was certain he would recognise the man should he see him again. The other witness, Jeanne Rawlings, had seen the vehicle driving slowly in the direction from Plantation 110. She was certain the vehicle was an Austin Cambridge A60.

In response to this information, police began the mammoth task of tracing every grey Austin A55 and A60 in the Midlands. Over the following months, investigators checked 1,375,000 files from eleven local taxation offices, identifying 23,097 vehicles which needed to be traced. The owners of these vehicles were interviewed, and their alibi on the date of Darby's abduction verified. As each successive vehicle was eliminated from the enquiry, investigators expanded their search radius—gradually interviewing the owners of over 44,000 Austin A55 and A60 vehicles both in and around the Midlands. (Note: The Austin A55 and A60 models were among the most popular British family vehicles of the 1960s.) As the volume of paperwork increased, a separate incident room devoted solely to Darby's abduction and murder was created. This incident room worked alongside the Walsall Incident Room previously established in relation to the previous murders and attempted murder linked to the same suspect, and some 200 officers operated out of both. Direct telephone lines were installed between the two incident rooms and both featured CCTV to enable investigators to rapidly view documents stored in the separate incident room.

"We are convinced that the man who murdered Christine Darby is the man in the Identikit picture and that it is a good likeness. His is a face well-known to someone—probably to several people. He is being shielded, either by a relative who knows of his guilt but is prevented from coming forward by misguided loyalty or fear, or by people who recognise a resemblance in an acquaintance but cannot bring themselves to believe that the person could be a child killer ... the innocent—and many innocent men may resemble the picture—have nothing to fear, but no child is safe while the man guilty of the murder of Christine Darby walks free."

— Detective Superintendent Ian Forbes, addressing the public to contact investigators if they recognised the colour Identikit picture of the suspect released to the media. 25 October 1967.

=== Composite drawing ===
With assistance from Victor Whitehouse and Jeanne Rawlings, police created and distributed the first colour facial composite of a suspect used in a manhunt in British criminal history. Over 2,000 copies of this facial composite of the individual seen close to Plantation 110 were distributed throughout the country on 5 September, with one national newspaper, the Daily Express, publishing the Identikit on their front page shortly thereafter. This Identikit produced several thousands of promising further leads for police to investigate.

=== Later developments ===
In January 1968, a team of two hundred detectives began renewed house-to-house enquiries at the over 54,000 houses in the Borough of Walsall in a renewed effort to apprehend the murderer. Male members of each household between the ages of 21 and 50 were required to populate a questionnaire accounting for their whereabouts on the date of each abduction and murder, and the names and addresses of individuals who could corroborate their whereabouts. When this initiative failed to bear fruit, investigators revisited the 1964 abduction and attempted murder of Julia Taylor, focusing their attention upon each man previously cleared of involvement in this incident and cross-checking his name against the subsequent murder investigations to determine if each individual warranted re-investigation. This initiative took several weeks to complete, with Detective Inspector Patrick Molloy discovering an inherent weakness in the criteria of clearing individuals provided with alibis: although several men had been questioned in relation to the attempted murder and the later murders, only a handful of these individuals actually had cast-iron alibis by which they were eliminated as suspects; records pertaining to many others simply read "Alibied by wife only."

By the spring of 1968, the task force investigators searching for the Cannock Chase murderer strongly believed the perpetrator had previously been questioned, but due to the reliance placed upon an alibi provided by a spouse or family member, had been cleared as a suspect and records relating to him simply marked "No Further Action" in the index card filing system. Each record warranting further scrutiny was reexamined although by mid-October, most leads had been exhausted and the number of investigators assigned full-time to the case had decreased to around forty.

=== Margaret Aulton ===
On 4 November 1968, a 10-year-old girl named Margaret Aulton narrowly escaped an attempted abduction in Bridgeman Street, Walsall, in which a man engaged her in conversation as she stood on a section of waste ground placing pieces of wood upon a bonfire. Aulton later recalled a man drove in the direction of a nearby garage forecourt before asking her if she would like to take some "rockets and Catherine wheels" from the front passenger seat of his car, which he had parked at the junction between Bridgeman Street and Queen Street. When the girl approached the vehicle, she noted the passenger seat was covered in newspaper and that no fireworks could be seen, causing her to hesitate; in response, the individual attempted to drag her into his vehicle. The child managed to break free and run away when her would-be abductor observed an 18-year-old woman named Wendy Lane exit a fish and chip shop across the road, causing him to speed away from the scene with his head lowered.

Lane had witnessed this incident; she made a mental note of the make of the vehicle (a green Ford Corsair with a cream roof) and the registration plate, which she recounted to police as being 429 LOP. Armed with this information, police contacted the local vehicle registrations officer for Walsall. No such vehicle registration existed but detectives examined a number of permutations, discovering that a local record existed for a green and cream or green and white Ford Corsair with a registration of 492 LOP. (Note: This vehicle was one of only twenty-six Ford Corsairs registered in the United Kingdom with any permutation of the numbers 429 and the letters LOP. Furthermore, this vehicle was the only green and cream-coloured Ford Corsair in the United Kingdom with any permutation of these numbers and letters.) This vehicle was registered to a 39-year-old local named Raymond Leslie Morris, who resided in a high-rise block of flats on Green Lane, directly opposite the Walsall police station.

The facial composite of Morris distributed nationwide in 1967. Several officers who interviewed Morris observed his likeness to this identikit.

== First arrest ==
Morris was arrested in connection with Aulton's attempted abduction the following morning. He denied any knowledge of the incident, but did confirm to detectives that he had only purchased the Corsair within the previous year, having previously owned a grey Austin A55. Although the young woman who had observed Aulton's attempted abduction failed to identify Morris from an identity parade (resulting in his initial release) the two investigators from the Cannock Incident Room dispatched to Walsall were so struck by his uncanny resemblance to the 1967 composite drawing (Note: Investigating officers later remarked this Identikit did not resemble Morris "if you regard [the Identikit] as a photo of him", but did closely resemble Morris as a collection of his facial features.) and his admission to having owned an Austin A55 they relayed their suspicions to their superior on their return to Cannock.

=== Further evidence ===
An examination of records pertaining to Morris in the index card filing system revealed Morris had been questioned four times between 1964 and 1968 in relation to the abductions and murders, and had initially been considered a strong suspect. On each occasion, his wife had provided an alibi as to his accounts of his whereabouts to authorities. As a result, his index card had simply been marked "Alibied wife only-NFA". No further action had been taken, although two police officers who had interviewed Morris on 29 February 1968 as part of the renewed house-to-house enquiries had commented upon the questionnaire Morris had filled in for investigators: "Very good likeness to the Identikit; not satisfied with this man due to the unsatisfactory alibi of wife alone."

By 12 November, an examination of Morris's insurance records revealed that at the time of the abduction of Julia Taylor and the murder of Margaret Reynolds, he had owned a two-tone Vauxhall Velox, which he had sold in November 1965. Furthermore, petrol receipts obtained from his employer placed him in specific areas at the time of abductions. For example, he had been driving a green company-issued Hillman Super Minx on the date of Reynolds' abduction, being tasked with visiting a particular Aston firm on this date. An examination of time card records at the factory where Morris worked revealed he had clocked out at 1:13 p.m. on 19 August 1967. These developments led Patrick Molloy to remark to his colleagues: "I think we've found the bastard."

== Second arrest ==
On 15 November, Morris was rearrested as he drove to work. He was informed his arrest was in relation to the murder of Christine Darby. In response, Morris simply stated, "Oh God! Is it my wife?" He was driven to Stafford police station to await questioning.

Within hours of Morris's arrest, his wife was also detained for questioning. She was questioned at Hednesford police station by Scotland Yard investigators, to determine the truth as to her husband's whereabouts on crucial dates linked to the enquiry. Initially, Carol Morris remained emphatic that her statements had been authentic and that her husband had returned home at approximately 2 p.m. on the date of Darby's abduction. However, within hours she had confessed to having given her husband a false alibi, adding that on the date of Darby's murder, Morris had not returned to their home until almost 5 p.m. with the explanation he and his manager had been "working late". He had then driven her into Walsall to pick up some cakes for her mother from a Marks and Spencers, arriving shortly before the shop's closing time. This renewed account of her movements was quickly corroborated by her parents.

Confronted with statements from his wife and in-laws as to the timing of his movements on the date of Darby's abduction on the evening of 15 November, Morris became distraught but quickly regained his composure—frequently refusing to answer questions. Morris also refused to participate in a further identity parade lineup. In response, police brought eyewitness Victor Whitehouse to the station the following morning. Whitehouse positively identified Morris as the man he had seen parked near Plantation 110 on the date of Christine Darby's murder, prompting Morris to ask for the legal representation of a solicitor. The Austin A55 was quickly traced and recovered from the individual to whom Morris had sold the vehicle; the car was impounded pending a forensic examination.

A subsequent police search of Morris's flat on 17 November uncovered a small cache of homemade child pornography. Many of these images depicted the same young girl, who was later determined to be Carol Morris's five-year-old niece. The background in several images revealed the photographs had been taken inside the flat itself, and an examination of the negatives revealed the images had been taken in August 1968. Although Morris's face was not depicted in any of the images, a distinctive wristwatch visible in several images had been discovered strapped to his ankle the previous day. By photographing Morris's hands and forearms in the same positions as those in the photographs, investigators were able to match several distinctive scars upon his hands with those visible upon the subject interfering with the child in the photographs.

=== Formal charges ===
On 17 November, Morris was formally charged with Darby's murder. He was remanded in custody at Winson Green Prison to await his first scheduled court appearance. By December, two charges of indecent assault pertaining to his niece and a further charge in relation to the attempted abduction of Margaret Aulton had also been filed against Morris. He appeared at Cannock Magistrates Court on 7 January 1969 and was committed to trial on this date.

Prior to Morris's arrest, police had conducted house-to-house enquiries at over 39,000 homes; interviewed approximately 80,000 people; and checked over a million car forms in their efforts to identify and apprehend the murderer.

== Trial ==
Morris was brought to trial at Stafford Assizes on 10 February 1969, charged with the murder of Christine Darby, two counts of sexual assault against his niece, and the attempted abduction of Margaret Aulton. He was tried before Mr Justice Ashworth and chose to plead not guilty to the charges of abduction and murder, but guilty to the charges of sexual assault against his niece.

The first day of proceedings saw legal arguments between the prosecution and defence as to whether Morris should be tried for each of the charges to which he had pled guilty and not guilty separately or together. Although the defence argued against the prosecution's contention that each of the charges pointed to the defendant's sexual and behavioural proclivities, and were thus unduly prejudicial, the judge ruled Morris could be tried on all three indictments simultaneously. The process of jury selection then began.

=== Testimony ===
On the second day of the trial, two of the most crucial prosecution witnesses—Victor Whitehouse and Jeanne Rawlings—testified as to their eyewitness statements regarding the man they had seen on Cannock Chase on 19 August 1967 and the Identikits they had subsequently helped investigators to produce. Although on both occasions Morris's defence counsel asked his client to stand before handing the witnesses copies of the colour and black-and-white composites, asking both to compare these composites to Morris as he physically appeared in the courtroom and stating "Neither Identikit picture bears very much resemblance to [Morris], does it?", both witnesses disagreed, with Whitehouse concluding his testimony by stating: "I think if I had happened to see Mr. Morris walking down a street on the other side, any time after August 1967, I would have been able to pick him out." Rawlings also stated the individual she had seen on Cannock Chase on the date in question "is the gentleman sitting in the dock."

Rawlings' testimony was followed by that of Detective Chief Superintendent Harry Bailey, who testified as to the discovery of Darby's body, the recovery of evidence at and near the crime scene, and the child's subsequent identification.

On 14 February, a police officer named Brian Porter testified as to a remark Morris had made in one of the house-to-house enquiries conducted in the months following Darby's murder. Porter testified Morris had expressed annoyance at being interviewed repeatedly, adding he knew police had a job to do, but that since he had no children of his own he "[couldn't] imagine" how Darby's mother must feel, having lost her daughter. Although Morris's counsel attempted to claim these words had not been spoken, Porter simply replied, "That was said, sir." Also to testify was Home Office Pathologist Alan Usher, who testified as to the discovery of Darby's body on Cannock Chase and her subsequent post-mortem. His testimony was accompanied by post-mortem photographs which illustrated the injuries inflicted upon the child.

==== Carol Morris ====
Carol Morris then testified on behalf of the prosecution. She first described the route her husband had typically taken to and from work, which—contrary to official statements her husband had given police—took him in close proximity to Camden Street and Caldmore Green. She then retracted the statements she had initially told investigators about the two having been shopping on the day of Darby's murder and Aulton's attempted abduction, stating that on each of the dates the two had been questioned by policemen as to her husband's movements, she had agreed to corroborate her husband's statements as she "didn't think he [could be] the person responsible." Carol then testified her husband had not returned home until the early evening of 19 August 1967 and that his demeanour had been normal on this date and that on the date of Aulton's attempted abduction, her husband had not returned to their flat until the ending credits of the soap opera Coronation Street were broadcast. (Note: An ITV television engineer would subsequently testify the precise timing of the ending of the 4 November 1968 episode of Coronation Street had ended was 7:56:42 p.m.) She also stated that her willingness to provide a false alibi for her husband on each occasion lay in her conviction her husband could not have committed the abduction and murder of a child.

Morris's mother-in-law then corroborated her daughter's testimony as to the timing of her arrival at her home on the date of Darby's abduction being after 5 p.m., adding that her son-in-law had explained the reason for their being late was that he had had to remain at work to update his boss on what had occurred at his workplace while his boss had been on holiday. Her husband then testified the time his daughter and son-in-law had arrived at his house was "towards the end" of the weekend recital of the nationwide football results, which invariably began at 5 p.m. This testimony was followed by that of Morris's employer, who produced Morris's clocking-off cards used on the date of Darby's murder and Aulton's attempted abduction, both of which revealed he had left his employment with sufficient time to commit both offences and contradicted the accounts he had given to his wife and investigators alike.

==== Defendant ====
Following the testimony of Detective Superintendent Ian Forbes and Detective Inspector Patrick Molloy, Morris testified in his own defence. His testimony lasted for almost five hours, concluding on 17 February. Morris denied ever having met Christine Darby, or being near Cannock Chase on the date of her murder. He also disputed his wife's altered testimony regarding the time he had returned home on 19 August; alleging her renewed statement was a lie and possibly sourcing from her being subject to police coercion. Morris also denied the earlier testimony of Molloy and Forbes, who had testified that when informed Morris was to be arrested for the murder of Christine Darby, he had exclaimed "Oh God. Is it my wife?" Morris alleged in his testimony that, following his arrest, he had been beaten in police interrogations, that police had not offered him an opportunity to participate in an identity parade lineup, and that he had only become taciturn with police following his arrest when informed by Forbes his wife wanted "nothing further to do" with him.

Questioned as to the explicit pictures of his five-year-old niece, Morris claimed his choosing to take the nude pictures sourced from an incident immediately prior when the child accidentally exposed herself as she "fell backwards" on his bed as he took innocuous images of her. He also claimed to be "disgusted" with himself for having taken the photographs, and unsure as to why he had taken them.

=== Closing arguments ===
On 18 February, both prosecution and defence attorneys delivered their closing arguments to the jury. Following these arguments, Judge Ashworth delivered a final address to the jury, informing the panel they must not "lump all the charges together" but consider each charge separately and deliver a separate verdict on each issue. Ashworth also informed the jury the reason he had ruled Morris be tried on each charge to which he had pleaded not guilty alongside the indecent assault charges—to which Morris had pled guilty—was that the indecent assault charges were similar fact evidence to the attempted abduction and murder charges, potentially linking the defendant to more than one incident involving the abuse of children. Ashworth also warned the jury against convicting Morris of the attempted abduction of Aulton and the murder of Darby due to outrage over the pornographic images introduced into evidence. The jury then retired to consider their verdicts.

"Mr Forbes, I am addressing you, but in addressing you, I am really addressing you and the many colleagues who have helped bring this dreadful case to its conclusion. There must be many mothers in and around Walsall and the area whose hearts will beat more lightly as a result of this verdict ... it must have been a nightmare for mothers and fathers in Walsall over the last months when [they heard of] a child missing."

— Judge Ashworth, addressing Detective Superintendent Ian Forbes following Morris's conviction for the murder of Christine Darby. 18 February 1969.

== Conviction ==
The jury deliberated for less than two hours on the afternoon of 18 February before reaching their verdict at 4:28 p.m.: Morris was found guilty of the attempted abduction of Margaret Aulton and the rape and murder of Christine Darby. He was sentenced to life imprisonment, with the judge simply informing him: "I do not intend to keep you long or make any comment about this terrible murder. There is only one sentence, as you know. Life imprisonment." (Note: Judge Ashworth initially imposed a minimum sentence of 25 years' imprisonment. This minimum term of imprisonment was later replaced with a whole life tariff by a Home Secretary or High Court judge.)

Upon receipt of this sentence, Morris turned to the public gallery; he briefly stared coldly in the direction of his second wife before he was led from the court to begin his life sentence as several members of the public repeatedly shouted insults and threats such as "Hang him!"

Morris was transferred from Winson Green Prison to HM Prison Durham on 19 February to begin his life sentence. A subsequent appeal Morris lodged against his conviction was dismissed in November 1969.

== Perpetrator ==
Raymond Leslie Morris
- Morris, circa 1966
- Born: 13 August 1929; Walsall, Staffordshire, England
- Died: 11 March 2014 (aged 84); HM Prison Preston, Lancashire, England
- Other names: The A34 Killer; The Monster of Cannock Chase; The Half-Day Killer
- Convictions: Murder (x1); Indecent assault (x2); Attempted abduction (x1)
- Penalty: Life imprisonment

=== Background ===
Raymond Leslie Morris was born on 13 August 1929 in Walsall, Staffordshire (now part of the county of West Midlands). Morris had lived in Walsall his entire life and was reported to have an IQ of 120. In 1951, he married a young woman named Muriel, the daughter of a neighbour, who was two years younger than him. The couple had two sons.

Morris's first wife would later describe her first husband as a highly sexed individual with a need to express sexual dominance and control over his spouse and household. According to his wife, her husband's "cheeks would go pale" if she did not disrobe immediately upon his ordering her to do so at any time of the day. Nonetheless, externally, he was a respectable, hard-working man. The couple's marriage lasted ten years before his first wife left the marital home, largely due to his violent and controlling behaviour. The couple officially divorced on the grounds of adultery in 1963, with Morris being ordered to pay child support to his wife. He later began threatening to withhold these payments from his wife unless she agreed to engage in sex with him. His first wife later remarried.

=== Second marriage ===
At the age of 35, Morris married again, this time to a 21-year-old woman named Carol Horsley. Two years later, in October 1966, he was arrested on suspicion of taking indecent photographs of two schoolgirls, aged 10 and 11, whom he had encountered truanting outside the factory where he worked and whom he lured into his flat at a time his wife was absent from the premises. Both girls were paid two shillings to allow Morris to undress and photograph them. Days later, both girls confided the incident to their parents. He was not charged in relation to this incident as although police extensively searched Morris's flat, they failed to find any photographic evidence or equipment to corroborate the children's claims.

At the time of the abductions of Reynolds and Tift, Morris worked as a sales representative for a Sheffield-based firm, although in 1966, he became an engineer. Highly respected and valued by his employer, by 1967, Morris had risen to the rank of foreman at a precision instruments factory in the town of Oldbury. Both personally and professionally, he was considered polite and helpful, but unfriendly.

At the time of the A34 murders, Morris and his wife lived in an opulently furnished flat within a well-maintained tower block at Regent House, Green Lane, Walsall. This tower block was directly opposite the local police station.

== Judicial review ==
In November 2010, Morris was granted a judicial review of the refusal of the Criminal Cases Review Commission to refer his case to the Court of Appeal, in a bid to overturn his conviction. Sections of this review contended the commission had wrongly rejected a number of his previous proposed grounds of appeal as falling short of the required legal standards. A statement from Morris's defence team said:

The application for a judicial review is the first stage in his attempts to have the matter referred back to the Court of Appeal after 42 years in prison. If Morris's conviction was overturned it would be the longest-running miscarriage of justice in British history. It might also potentially mean that a child murderer had remained at large for more than 40 years during Morris's incarceration.

This judicial review was rejected by Mr Justice Simon in February 2011. Shortly thereafter, Morris indicated his potential intention to transfer his case to the European Court of Human Rights. He later abandoned this plan, stating his belief he would die in prison.

The Austin A55 used by Morris to abduct Christine Darby is publicly burned on 28 March 1969

== Aftermath ==
The four-year enquiry into the Cannock Chase murders is reported to be one of the most exhaustive British child murder investigations of the 20th century. By the time investigators had apprehended Morris, they had amassed over a million index cards, making the volume of information so enormous and cumbersome that by the autumn of 1967 the task of cross-checking information had become difficult and laborious.

In total, Morris had been questioned five times in relation to his whereabouts throughout the manhunt for the Cannock Chase murderer. Although he bore a striking resemblance to the 1967 Identikit, Morris had not been considered a suspect warranting further investigation due to his wife repeatedly providing him with a false alibi and initial administrative protocol. His wife was not charged with repeatedly perverting the course of justice.

Shortly after Morris's arrest, investigators uncovered archived interrogation records dating from early 1966 pertaining to the search for Diana Tift. These records revealed Morris's own brother had been to Walsall police station, stating he and his mother had long known of Morris's predilection for prepubescent girls and that they believed Morris to be capable of abducting and murdering Reynolds and Tift, whose bodies had at the time yet to be found. However, as Morris's brother had no evidence to substantiate his statement, his report had been marked "No Further Action." This record was not discovered until after Morris's arrest regarding the attempted abduction.

Although convicted only of murdering Christine Darby, Morris is considered the chief suspect in the deaths of both Reynolds and Tift, and the abduction and attempted murder of Julia Taylor, despite a lack of sufficient evidence for him to be charged with any of these offences. All three cases were officially closed in 1969. Relatives of all three children share investigators' conviction Morris had killed both children and attempted to murder Taylor in addition to having killed Christine Darby.

Shortly after Morris took the stand and began to testify in his own defence at his trial, Julia Taylor—then aged in her early teens—rose from the public gallery, hysterically pointing at Morris and crying out: "That's him! That's the man that did it to me!" She was gently ushered, weeping, from the public gallery. The jury were not informed as to her identity due to fear their knowledge of her identity and ordeal may prejudice the trial.

Five weeks after the conclusion of Morris's trial, on 28 March 1969, the Austin A55 car in which he had abducted and murdered Christine Darby was bought by a Worcestershire-based car dealer, who immediately drove the car onto the forecourt of his garage and publicly burned the vehicle.

Raymond Morris died at the HMP Preston health facility of natural causes on 11 March 2014 at the age of 84, having spent the final 45 years of his life in prison. Ten days before his death, he signed a disclaimer rejecting any further active medical treatment and specifically stating he did not wish his family to be informed of this decision.

Morris never admitted his guilt in any of the Cannock Chase murders and never expressed any semblance of remorse. By the time of Morris's death, he had become one of the oldest and longest-serving prisoners in England and Wales.

Nine months after Morris's death, the Ministry of Justice publicly released the details of the cost of Morris's taxpayer-funded cremation. In response, a retired policewoman named Maureen Freeman, who had participated in the manhunt to identify and apprehend Morris, stated: "I'm sure the families of his victims would be disgusted. Cannock Chase will never forget what he did."

== Media ==
=== Literature ===
- Hawkes, Harry (1971). Murder on the A34. John Long Publishing. ISBN 0-09102-960-0.
- Molloy, Pat (1990) [1988]. Not the Moors Murders: A Detective's Story of the Biggest Child-killer Hunt in History. Gomer Press. ISBN 978-0-863-83473-8.

=== Television ===
- Regional current affairs programme ATV Today broadcast a 20-minute episode pertaining to the abduction and murder of Christine Darby in November 1969. Morris's wife is among those interviewed for this programme.
- The Crime & Investigation Network have broadcast an episode focusing on the murders committed by Harold Jones as part of their Murder Casebook series. Presented by Fred Dinenage, this 45-minute episode was first broadcast in November 2012. Criminologist David Wilson is among those interviewed.

== See also ==
- Capital punishment in the United Kingdom
- Child abuse
- Child sexual abuse
- List of prisoners with whole-life tariffs
- List of serial killers by country
- List of serial killers by number of victims

== Cited works and further reading ==
- Basannavar, Nick (2021). Sexual Violence Against Children in Britain Since 1965: Trailing Abuse. Macmillan Publishers Ltd. ISBN 978-3-030-83148-6.
- Berry-Dee, Christopher (2021). A Special Place in Hell: The World's Most Depraved Serial Killers. Ad Lib Publishers Ltd. ISBN 978-1-913-54375-4.
- Borrell, Clive; Cashinella, Brian (1975). Crime in Britain Today. Routledge & Kegan Paul Ltd. pp. 50–52. ISBN 978-0-710-08232-9.
- Butler, Ivan (1973). Murderers' England. Hale. pp. 71–72. ISBN 978-0-7091-4054-2.
- Duffy, Wendy (2003). Children and Bereavement. Church House Publishing. ISBN 0-715-14998-9.
- Fido, Martin (1995). Chronicle of Twentieth Century Murder. Bracken Publishing. p. 79. ISBN 978-1-858-91390-2.
- Frasier, David K. (1996). Murder Cases of the Twentieth Century: Biographies and Bibliographies of 280 Convicted or Accused Killers. McFarland & Co. pp. 325–329. ISBN 978-0-786-40184-0.
- Gaute, J. H. H.; Odell, Robin (1991) [1989]. The New Murderers' Who's Who. Dorset Press. ISBN 978-0-245-54639-6.
- Hawkes, Harry (1971). Murder on the A34. John Long Publishing. ISBN 0-09102-960-0
- Hayhurst, Alan (2012) [2008]. Staffordshire Murders. History Press. pp. 134–149 ISBN 978-0-750-94706-0
- Jackson, Ian (1971). The Provincial Press and the Community. Manchester University Press. pp. 61–73. ISBN 978-0-719-00460-5.
- Jeffers, H. P. (1992). Bloody Business: An Anecdotal History of Scotland Yard. Pharos Books. ISBN 978-0-886-87678-4
- Lane, Brian (1991). The Murder Guide to Great Britain. Robinson Publishing Ltd. ISBN 1-854-87083-1.
- Matthews, Tanita; Clark, Christopher (2024). The Murder of Judith Roberts: The Mark of Peter Sutcliffe. Pen & Sword. p. 7. ISBN 978-1-399-08016-3.
- Jackson, Ian (1971). The Provincial Press and the Community. Manchester University Press. pp. 61–73. ISBN 978-0-719-00460-5.
- Molloy, Patrick (1990) [1988]. Not the Moors Murders: A Detective's Story of the Biggest Child-killer Hunt in History. Gomer Press. ISBN 978-0-863-83473-8
- Morris, Jim (2015). The Who's Who of British Crime in the Twentieth Century. Amberley Publishing. ISBN 978-1-445-63924-6
- Ramsland, Katherine; McGrain, Patrick N. (2010). Inside the Minds of Sexual Predators. Praeger Publishing. ISBN 978-0-313-37960-4.
- Richards, Cara (2000). The Loss of Innocents: Child Killers and Their Victims. Scholarly Resources. ISBN 978-0-520-28287-2
- Sanders, John (2008). Inside the Mind of the Sex Killer. Forum Press. ISBN 978-1-874-35840-4
- Thomas, Donald (1993). Dead Giveaway: Murder Avenged from the Grave. Michael O'Mara Books. ISBN 978-1-854-79930-2.
- Wilson, Colin (2000). The Mammoth Book of the History of Murder. Carroll & Graf Publishers. ISBN 978-0-786-70714-0.
- Wilson, Colin; Seaman, Donald (1988). Encyclopedia of Modern Murder: 1962–1982. Bonanza Books. ISBN 978-0-517-66559-6
