= Stanley Bernson =

Convicted American murderer and self-confessed serial killer (born 1936)

- Born: Stanley Marvin Bernson; January 2, 1936 (age 90); Spokane, Washington, U.S.
- Conviction: Murder (x2)
- Penalty: Life imprisonment (x2)

Details
- Victims: 2–30
- Span of crimes: 1978–1979
- Country: United States
- States: Oregon, Washington
- Date apprehended: March 1980
- Imprisoned at: Washington State Penitentiary, Walla Walla, Washington

Stanley Marvin Bernson (born January 2, 1936) is an American kidnapper, murderer and self-confessed serial killer. Convicted for two known murders in Oregon and Washington in 1978 and 1979, respectively, Bernson was later investigated for around 28 additional murders around the Northwest, some of which he claimed to have committed in the company of notorious serial killer Ted Bundy. No further victims have been linked to Bernson since his incarceration, and he continues to serve his life term at the Washington State Penitentiary.

== Prior criminal record ==
In March 1967, Bernson was given a six-month suspended sentence for abducting a 13-year-old girl and driving her around Chattaroy, an unincorporated area northeast of Spokane. During the trip, the victim suffered an injury to the back of the head, which Bernson claimed had originated from a wrench flying off a shelf and hitting her when he crashed his car into a ditch. After the incident, he returned her home without harm. He was similarly charged with molesting a 7-year-old girl in Spokane in February 1976, but it is unclear whether he was convicted of that or not.

== Confessions and attempted escape ==
Throughout the 1970s, Bernson worked as a produce salesman, allowing him to freely travel across multiple states, with records of him residing in Spokane, the Tri-Cities area, Moses Lake, Ritzville, Othello, Hermiston and Pendleton from May 1973 to April 1975. In addition, he indicated that he had also lived for short periods in Montana and Alaska, as well as supposedly working as a big game hunter in Africa.

In March 1980, Bernson was convicted of second-degree assault after attempting to stab a Hermiston woman in Spokane. For this crime, he was incarcerated at the Washington State Penitentiary in Walla Walla, to serve a 10-year prison sentence. Two years later, he was charged with the murder of 22-year-old Diann Remington, a Spokane Community College student who disappeared from her mother's home in Richland on January 4, 1979, and whose body was found by goose hunters in a field near Benton City on December 29. Bernson was then transferred to the county jail in Prosser to await trial. His trial began on November 15, 1982, and the following year, Bernson was convicted and sentenced to life imprisonment in Remington's murder.

Following his conviction, Bernson indicated to authorities that he was responsible for other murders, but refused to indicate a possible number. In 1985, after being assured by prosecutors in both Washington and Oregon that they would not seek the death penalty, Bernson admitted that he killed around 30 women while travelling through the Northwest. Among his confessions was the murder of 15-year-old Sharon Weber, who had disappeared from Hermiston, Oregon in December 1978 and her remains found near the Cold Springs Reservoir on September 16, 1985. Authorities decided to halt their investigations until Bernson was convicted of this killing, and allowed him to be extradited to the Umatilla County Jail in 1986. However, fearing that he was an escape risk, Sheriff Jim Carey constructed an elaborate ruse to see what he would do.

Carey ordered the jailer guarding Bernson to seemingly accept his proposal to let him escape and, after being offered $98,000 in exchange for liberating him, the jailer gave Bernson a gun loaded with blanks. After being given the gun, Bernson ordered the guards to empty their wallets and get into the cell after which he headed towards a corridor. However, unbeknownst to him, Carey had expected this, and trapped Bernson by locking the doors both in front and behind him, forcing the would-be escapee to surrender himself after 22 minutes. After being returned to his cell, Bernson explained that he and his accomplices had planned to rent a helicopter to land on the courthouse building, hijacking it, cutting the antenna cables, and wire screening, before successfully flying away to an abandoned farmhouse, where he would hold the occupants hostage. While inspecting his cell, jailers located a letter opener and a diagram detailing his extensive escape plan. Carey, who had recorded the entire event via the security cameras, later defended his actions, saying that it was "excellent training for the staff".

== Trial and imprisonment ==
On December 1, 1988, Bernson was convicted on two counts of solicitation to escape and two counts of kidnapping, for which he was given 20 years imprisonment and $2,500 in fines. However, his trial for Weber's murder continued to be delayed due to faulty extradition protocols between Washington and Oregon, prompting Justice Jack Olsen to dismiss the murder charge and return Bernson to Washington State Penitentiary. This decision was appealed by Oregon Attorney General Dave Frohnmayer, who contested that Bernson was causing the delays and that the charges should be reinstated. After two years, the decision was reversed and Bernson was returned to Oregon to stand trial for the killing.

In early October 1992, despite his recanting his confession, Bernson was convicted of Weber's murder. He was sentenced to life imprisonment, and his conviction upheld in 1994. If still alive, he presumably is still serving his sentence at the Washington State Penitentiary.

=== Veracity of claims ===
While authorities at the time investigated Bernson's claims of additional victims, no further murders were linked back to him after the Weber case, and his claims of accompanying Bundy remain unsubstantiated. The only murders he is publicly known to have been investigated for are the 1959 rape and killing of 9-year-old Candice "Candy" Rogers, and the 1978 strangulation of 16-year-old Krisann Baxter, both in Spokane. Baxter's murderer was identified in 2023 as Keith D. Lindblom, who died in a fire in 1981, and Rogers' killer was identified in 2021 as soldier John Reigh Hoff, who committed suicide in 1970.

== See also ==
- Ted Bundy
