= Murder of Mary Theresa Simpson =

1964 killing in New York

Mary Theresa Simpson
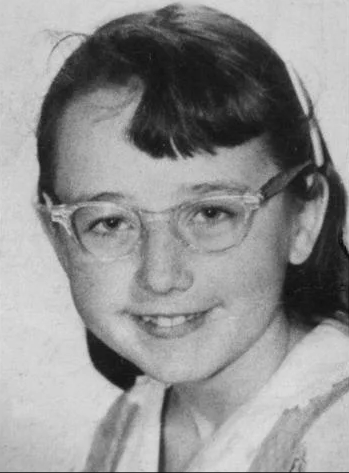
- Born: 1951 or 1952; Elmira, New York, US
- Died: March 15, 1964; Elmira, New York, US
- Cause of death: Homicide by strangulation
- Parents: Ellsworth Simpson (father); Rose Simpson (mother)

Mary Theresa Simpson (1951/1952 – March 15, 1964) was a 12-year-old girl from Elmira, New York, who was kidnapped, sexually assaulted and killed on March 15, 1964. The identity of her killer, Alfred Murray Jr., was not discovered until 2026. Murray died in 2004.

== Background ==
Mary Theresa Simpson was born in 1951 or 1952 in Elmira, New York, to Ellsworth and Rose Simpson. She had an older brother and an older sister. She also had an older half-brother. After her parents separated in May 1963, she lived with her father. In late 1963, Simpson and her father moved to nearby Hammondsport, causing her mother to only see her monthly. During the earlier half of March 1964, they moved back to Elmira, after her father found a new job there.

== Disappearance and search ==
On March 15, 1964, Simpson left her father's apartment at around 3 p.m., telling him that she was going to visit her cousin. Unbeknownst to her father, Simpson actually visited her mother. She spent an hour at her mother's house, before leaving to see her cousin. Simpson left her cousin's house around 6:30. She was last seen in front of a store at 7 by a friend whom she told she was heading home. Her father reported her missing to the police at around 11, after she had failed to return home.

The police were not initially concerned with Simpson's disappearance. Nonetheless, the next day, they searched several empty homes. They also contacted some of her friends, but were unsuccessful in finding her. Police contacted the district attorney on that same day, indicating that the circumstances regarding her disappearance were not normal.

By March 18, the police began to suspect foul play in her disappearance. Vacant buildings, abandoned homes, and junkyards were searched. Police departments throughout both New York and Pennsylvania were also notified of Simpson's disappearance.

== Discovery ==
On March 19, Simpson's body was found in a wooded area southwest of Elmira by a man hiking with his two sons. She was fully clothed, but covered in dirt, stones, and tree branches. Her throat had also been stuffed with dirt and twigs. An autopsy determined that she had been sexually assaulted and strangled to death. She had also been murdered in or near the area where her body was found.

== Investigation ==
By October 1964, police had questioned 300 suspects. WELM and the Star-Gazette also raised $1,000 for a reward fund for anyone with information leading to Simpson's killer's arrest. By 1972, this reward was increased to $5,000. Despite their efforts, no arrest was made.

In 2003, investigators from the New York State Police Forensic Investigation Center determined that fluids on her skirt were semen. DNA was then extracted from the fluid and entered into CODIS, but it did not match the profile of any suspects. The DNA was resubmitted in 2014, but there were again no matches.

Partnering with the FBI, the Elmira Police Department received a grant from the non-profit organization Season of Justice in 2022 to help solve the case. In 2023, investigators partnered with Othram and students from Russell Sage College to conduct genealogical analysis. By 2025, they had identified Alfred Murray Jr., who had died in 2004, as a suspect. Investigators then collected a DNA sample from his son, which confirmed that his DNA was related to the DNA found on Simpson's skirt. In November of that year, investigators exhumed the body of Murray, and compared his DNA to the DNA from Simpson's skirt. They found that the odds of that DNA belonging to a person other than Murray were less than 1 in 320 billion. Until then, Murray had never been considered a suspect in the case. On February 10, 2026, the Elmira Police Department held a press conference announcing that they believe that Murray killed Simpson, making it the 18th case in the state of New York solved by Othram.

== See also ==
- List of kidnappings (1960–1969)
- List of solved missing person cases (1950–1969)
