= Stanley Bailey =

Sir Stanley Ernest Bailey CBE QPM (30 September 1926 – 9 August 2008) was a senior British police officer. He was chief constable of Northumbria Police from 1975 until 1991.

Bailey was born in Somers Town, London, and during World War II was conscripted to work in the coal mining industry as a Bevin Boy. In 1947 he began his career with the Metropolitan Police.

The hunt for the Cannock Chase murderer was led by Bailey, Staffordshire's assistant chief constable at the time.

== Honours ==

Ribbon	Description	Notes
	Order of the British Empire (CBE)	Civil Division; Commander
	Knight Bachelor (Kt)	
	Queen's Police Medal (QPM)	1973
	Police Long Service and Good Conduct Medal	

== See also ==
- Donald Neilson
