= HM Prison Preston =

Men's prison in Preston, England

HMP Preston
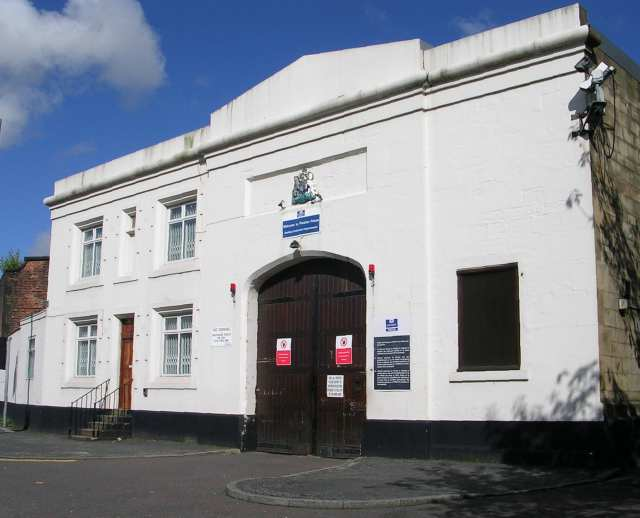

- Location in Preston city centre Location in the City of Preston district Location in Lancashire
- Location: Preston, Lancashire; 53°45′42″N 2°41′19″W
- Security class: Adult Male/Category B
- Capacity: 750
- Population: 667 (30 September 2022)
- Opened: 1790
- Managed by: HM Prison Services
- Governor: Dan Cooper
- Website: Preston at justice.gov.uk

HM Prison Preston is a Category B men's prison, located in the City Centre area of Preston in Lancashire, England. The prison is operated by His Majesty's Prison Service.

== History ==
There has been a prison on the current site of HMP Preston since 1790, however it was completely rebuilt as a Victorian radial design prison between 1840 and 1895. Closed from 1931 to 1939, the prison was used by the military from 1939 to 1948. That year, the prison was converted back to civilian use. It was re-roled as a Category B prison for local adult males in 1990.

In October 1999, an inspection report from His Majesty's Chief Inspector of Prisons stated that progress at the prison was being impeded by "obstructive and uncooperative staff" who "used a heavy-handed approach with inmates and relied on strength of numbers rather than personal relationships to keep order."

In July 2001, it was revealed that Preston was the most overcrowded prison in England and Wales. Statistics showed that Preston had a 78% rate of overcrowding. Three years later, a report from the Prison Reform Trust again highlighted Preston as being the most overcrowded prison, with 90% of inmates sharing single cells.

== The prison today ==
Preston is a Category B prison holding local adult males, remanded or sentenced from the Crown Court and from magistrates' courts serving Lancashire and Cumbria.

== Notable inmates ==
- John McGowan-Fazakerley – Convicted of causing the death of, sexually assaulting and abusing his 13-month-old adoptive son alongside his partner, Jamie Varley.
