= Attica, New York =

Attica
- Town
- Location in Wyoming County and the state of New York.
- Coordinates: 42°51′45″N 78°17′03″W
- Country: United States
- State: New York
- County: Wyoming

Area
  - Total: 36.03 sq mi (93.31 km^{2})
  - Land: 35.71 sq mi (92.49 km^{2})
  - Water: 0.32 sq mi (0.82 km^{2})

Population (2010)
  - Total: 7,702
  - Estimate (2016): 7,448
  - Density: 208.5/sq mi (80.52/km^{2})
- Time zone: UTC-5 (Eastern (EST))
  - Summer (DST): UTC-4 (EDT)
- FIPS code: 36-121-03012
- GNIS feature ID: 0942677
- Website: www.TownOfAttica.net

Attica is a town in Wyoming County, New York, United States. The population was 6,155 as of 2024.

The Town of Attica is on the northern boundary of the county and contains part of a village also named Attica (the northern part of the village is within the adjacent town of Alexander in Genesee County).

The Department of Corrections is a major employer, as both the maximum security Attica Correctional Facility and medium-security Wyoming Correctional Facility are located here.

== History ==
The Town of Attica was established in western New York in 1802 from a part of the Town of Sheldon. In 1816, part of Attica was taken to organize the new Town of Orangeville.

Attica is the location of two state prisons: New York's maximum-security Attica Correctional Facility and medium-security Wyoming Correctional Facility, both located south of the Village of Attica. Since the 1930s Attica had been a prison town, and most correctional officers live here or nearby with their families.

On September 9, 1971, in the Attica Prison riot, more than 1200 inmates (of 2200) took over control of the prison. They sought to negotiate with authorities to improve living conditions. The state suppressed the uprising on September 13, 1971, with armed corrections officers, state police, and New York National Guard. Of the 43 men who died, law enforcement gunfire killed 10 hostages and 30 prisoners.

== Geography ==
The town and county are located in western New York. The northern town line is the border of Genesee County.

According to the United States Census Bureau, the town has a total area of 36.0 square miles (93 km^{2}), of which 35.7 square miles (92 km^{2}) is land and 0.3 square miles (0.78 km^{2}) (0.83%) is water. Tonawanda Creek passes through the northwest part of the town.

NY-98 intersects NY-238 and NY-354 at the village of Attica.

== Demographics ==
Historical population
| Census | Pop. | Note | %± |
|---|---|---|---|
| 1820 | 1,519 | | — |
| 1830 | 2,485 | | 63.6% |
| 1840 | 2,710 | | 9.1% |
| 1850 | 2,363 | | −12.8% |
| 1860 | 2,547 | | 7.8% |
| 1870 | 2,546 | | 0.0% |
| 1880 | 3,099 | | 21.7% |
| 1890 | 3,002 | | −3.1% |
| 1900 | 2,677 | | −10.8% |
| 1910 | 2,749 | | 2.7% |
| 1920 | 2,743 | | −0.2% |
| 1930 | 2,891 | | 5.4% |
| 1940 | 5,477 | | 89.5% |
| 1950 | 5,722 | | 4.5% |
| 1960 | 5,781 | | 1.0% |
| 1970 | 6,171 | | 6.7% |
| 1980 | 5,693 | | −7.7% |
| 1990 | 7,383 | | 29.7% |
| 2000 | 7,806 | | 5.7% |
| 2010 | 7,702 | | −1.3% |
| 2020 | 6,748 | | −12.4% |
| 2024 (est.) | 6,155 | ▼ | −8.8% |
U.S. Decennial Census

As of the census of 2000, there were 6,028 people, 1,497 households, and 1,053 families residing in the town. The population density was 168.8 inhabitants per square mile (65.2/km^{2}). There were 1,603 housing units at an average density of 44.9 per square mile (17.3/km^{2}). The racial makeup of the town was 72.79% White, 21.07% African American, 0.33% Native American, 0.33% Asian, 5.18% from other races, and 0.30% from two or more races. Hispanic or Latino of any race were 9.16% of the population.

There were 1,497 households, out of which 33.9% had children under the age of 18 living with them, 56.5% were married couples living together, 10.2% had a female householder with no husband present, and 29.6% were non-families. 25.3% of all households were made up of individuals, and 10.0% had someone living alone who was 65 years of age or older. The average household size was 2.58 and the average family size was 3.08.

In the town, the population was spread out, with 16.8% under the age of 18, 10.8% from 18 to 24, 44.2% from 25 to 44, 20.0% from 45 to 64, and 8.2% who were 65 years of age or older. The median age was 35 years. For every 100 females, there were 209.4 males. For every 100 females age 18 and over, there were 240.6 males.

The median income for a household in the town was $44,877, and the median income for a family was $49,375. Males had a median income of $32,060 versus $22,220 for females. The per capita income for the town was $17,817. About 3.7% of families and 6.3% of the population were below the poverty line, including 5.8% of those under age 18 and 5.6% of those age 65 or over.

== Communities and locations in the Town of Attica ==
- Attica – Part of the Village of Attica is in the north part of the town. The remainder is inside Genesee County.
- Attica Center – A hamlet southeast of Attica Village on Route 238.
- Vernal Corners – A hamlet in the northeast corner of the town.

== Education ==
Attica Central School District covers the vast majority of the town. Other parts of the town are in Wyoming Central School District, Warsaw Central School District, and Alexander Central School District.
