= Chattaroy, Washington =

Unincorporated community in Washington, United States

- Unincorporated community
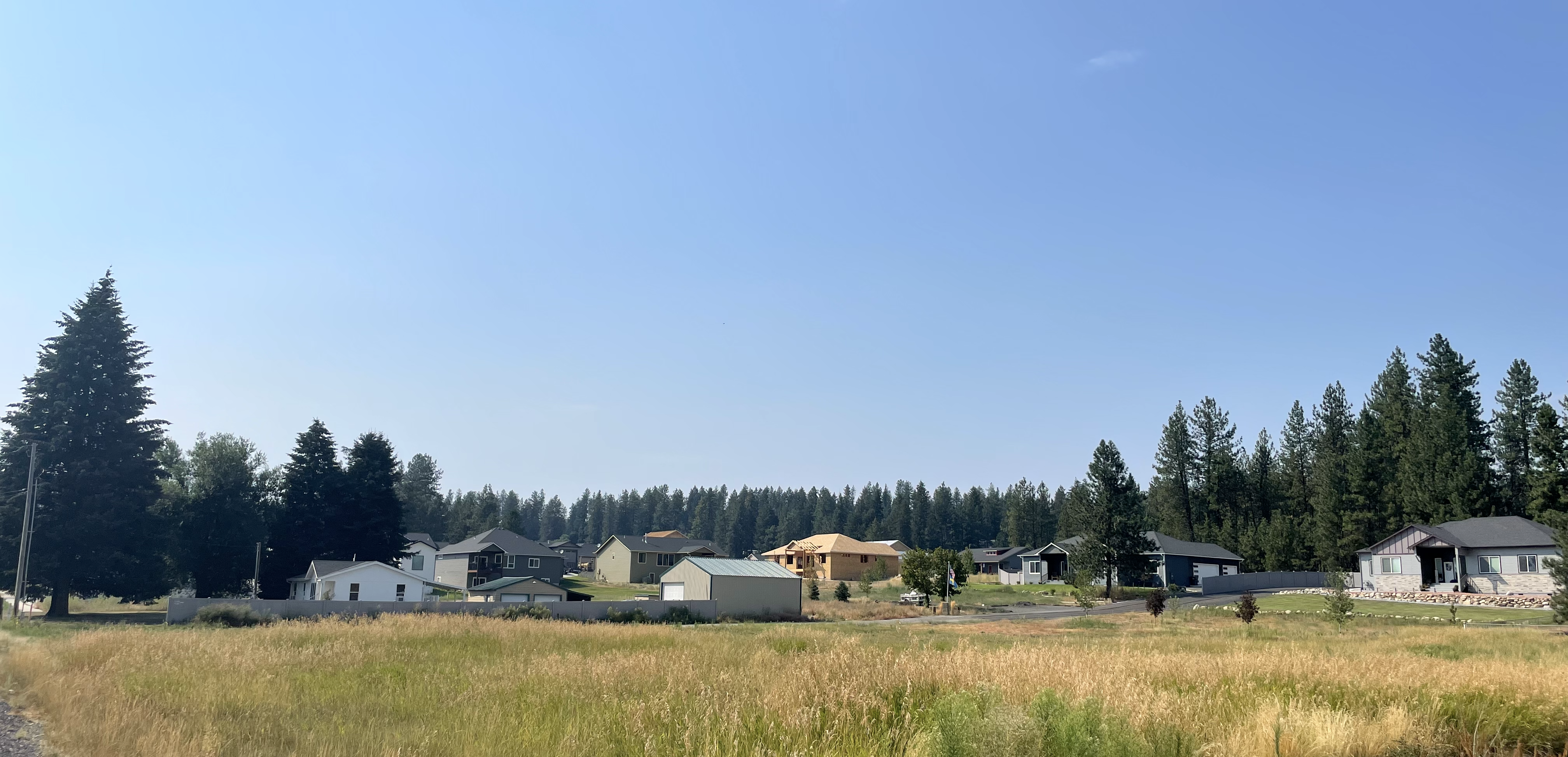
- Chattaroy from the Post Office, August 2022.

- Location within Washington (state)
- Coordinates: 47°53′23″N 117°21′28″W
- Country: United States
- State: Washington
- County: Spokane
- Elevation: 1,709 ft (521 m)
- Time zone: UTC-8 (Pacific (PST))
  - Summer (DST): UTC-7 (PDT)
- ZIP code: 99003
- Area code: 509
- GNIS feature ID: 1512083

Chattaroy is an unincorporated community in Spokane County, Washington, United States. The town is located on U.S. Route 2 approximately 10 miles (16 km) north-northeast of Spokane at the confluence of the Little Spokane River and Deer Creek. Today, Chattaroy Elementary School is a school that teaches Preschool to fourth grade and is in the Riverside School District.

== Name ==
Originally, Chattaroy was named Kidd. Kidd was renamed to Chattaroy at the request of the Great Northern Railroad. There was another town named Kidd (in Montana) that was on the Great Northern Line so the railroad requested a name change to avoid confusion.

Mrs Robert Cowgill and Mrs Alexander B. Owen renamed Kidd to the name of Chattaroy. Chattaroi ( no “y”) was the hero in a novel that these two women were reading at the time. They changed the French spelling of “roi” to “roy”.

== History ==
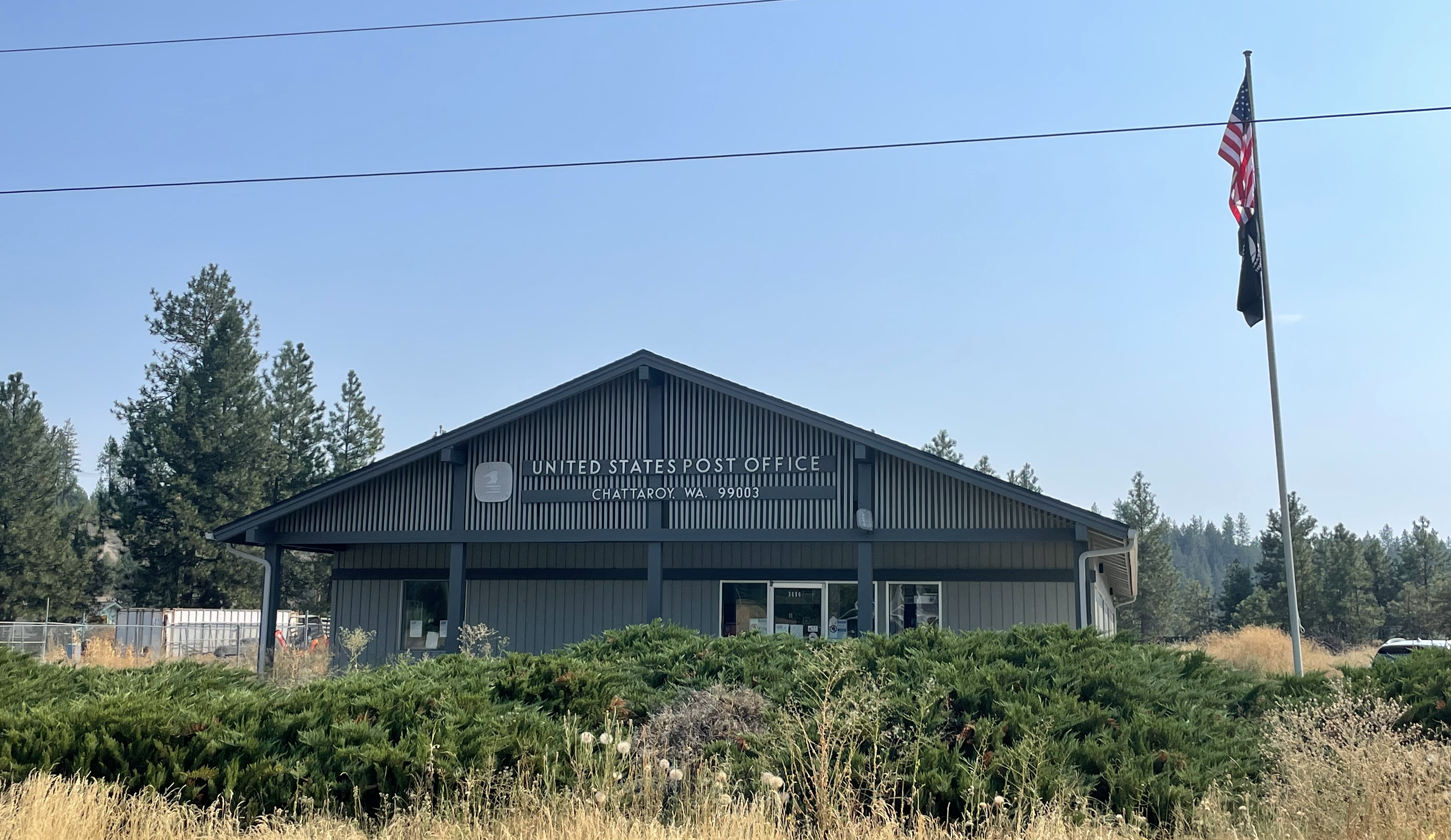
Chattaroy Post Office

Founded in the 1880s, Chattaroy is located two miles east of the defunct Spokane Falls and Northern Railway's Dragoon station. Residents were buried in the Chattaroy cemetery as early as 1888. A post office called Chattaroy has been in operation since 1888. The origin of the name Chattaroy is obscure.

In 1900 the community consisted of approximately 250 residents, two general stores, Barker's Hotel, a drug store operated by a Dr. Smith, a blacksmith shop, a public school with some 60 students, a Congregational church ministered by Reverend F. McConaughy, a Sunday school, and a Modern Woodmen of America hall.

== Climate ==
This region experiences warm and dry summers, with no average monthly temperatures above 71.6 °F. According to the Köppen Climate Classification system, Chattaroy has a warm-summer Mediterranean climate, abbreviated "Csb" on climate maps.
