= Robert Zarinsky =

American convicted murderer

- Zarinsky in 1975
- Born: September 2, 1940; Linden, New Jersey, US
- Died: November 28, 2008 (aged 68); South Woods State Prison, Bridgeton, New Jersey, U.S.
- Conviction: Murder
- Penalty: Life imprisonment

Details
- Victims: 3–10
- Span of crimes: 1965 – 1974 (possibly earlier)
- Country: United States
- State: New Jersey
- Date apprehended: February 22, 1975

Robert “Bob” Zarinsky (September 2, 1940 – November 28, 2008) was an American serial killer who killed three teenage girls in Monmouth County, New Jersey, between 1965 and 1969. Convicted of one of these murders and sentenced to life in prison, he was also a suspect in four other murders, including the 1958 murder of a police officer in Rahway, but he was later acquitted for that crime.

== Criminal history and death ==
=== Summary ===
After a series of lesser crimes and numerous stays in psychiatric institutions:

- In 1975, Zarinsky was sentenced to life imprisonment for the 1969 murder of Rose Calandriello, 17, of Atlantic Highlands, New Jersey.
- In 2001, he was acquitted of the 1958 murder of Rahway, New Jersey police officer Chuck Bernoskie.
- In 2008, Zarinsky was indicted for the 1968 murder of Jane Durrua, 13, of Middletown, New Jersey, but he died before the trial could begin.
- In 2016, it was announced that DNA evidence conclusively linked Zarinsky to the 1965 murder of Mary Agnes Klinsky, 18, of Raritan High School.
- He was also the prime suspect in the 1969–1974 murders of:
  - Linda Balabanow, 17, of Union Township, Union County, New Jersey
  - Doreen Carlucci, 14, and Joanne Delardo, 15, of Woodbridge Township, New Jersey
  - Ann Logan, 19, of Elizabeth, New Jersey

Zarinsky repeatedly boasted that he could solve up to ten homicides, hoping to parlay the information into a more-lenient prison sentence.

=== Calandriello murder ===
Rosemary Calandriello was a 17-year-old girl from Atlantic Highlands, New Jersey, who disappeared on August 25, 1969. Her body was never found, but Zarinsky was convicted in 1975 of murdering her. He was sentenced to life imprisonment for this crime, upheld on appeal. He was the first person in New Jersey ever to be convicted of murder without the victim's body having been found, a conviction upheld on appeal. In 1988, Zarinsky claimed that he had accidentally killed Calandriello and buried her body in northwest New Jersey. He later claimed that he had thrown her body into the Atlantic Ocean.

=== Bernoskie murder ===
In 2001, Zarinsky was tried and acquitted of the November 28, 1958, murder of Rahway police officer Charles Bernoskie, 31. Bernoskie happened to come upon a burglary in progress at the Miller Pontiac car dealership in Rahway. He was then shot and killed by one of the burglars, either Zarinsky or his cousin Theodore Schiffer. Although Bernoskie shot both suspects, they were able to elude capture. No one was charged with the murder until 1999. Schiffer left a fingerprint at the scene of the Miller Pontiac burglary, but it was not until 1999 that the fingerprint was matched to him. He had never been fingerprinted and therefore there was no record of his fingerprints. Schiffer pleaded guilty to burglary and served three years in prison.

Schiffer was implicated as an accomplice in the burglary and murder, in testimony from Zarinsky's sister, Judith Sapsa, who was under investigation for embezzling $121,500 from a mutual fund account owned by Zarinsky. Sapsa testified at the Bernoskie murder trial that she had assisted her mother with removing bullets from Zarinsky and Schiffer on the night of the Bernoskie murder. Sapsa also testified that Zarinsky stated to her that "Teddy and I shot a cop." Despite the testimony of Schiffer and Sapsa, their credibility and motives were questioned, and Zarinsky was acquitted of the Bernoskie murder.

When Zarinsky was indicted in 2000 for the murder, Elizabeth Bernoskie, Bernoskie's widow, filed a wrongful-death suit against Zarinsky in civil court. In August 2003, a jury found Zarinsky responsible for the death and awarded Bernoskie $9,500,000 plus interest. In 2004, $154,000 was seized from Zarinsky's assets, and Mrs. Bernoskie divided this award among her legal representatives and her six children.

From prison, Zarinsky appealed the verdict; eventually, it was reversed. The court said it overturned the judgment because the lawsuit was not allowed under state law. In July 2007, a New Jersey Appellate Court upheld the decision and ordered the money returned to Zarinsky. Elizabeth Bernoskie no longer had the money and feared losing her home. The New Jersey Patrolmen's Benevolent Association then organized efforts to repay it to spare Mrs. Bernoskie and her children from having to give back the award money from their own pockets.

=== Durrua murder ===
On March 11, 2008, a grand jury returned an indictment against Zarinsky for the 1968 murder of 13-year-old Jane Durrua, based on DNA evidence. Durrua went missing on the evening of November 4, 1968, and her body was found the next morning in a field in Middletown, New Jersey.

=== Klinsky murder ===
On February 17, 2016, the New Jersey State Police Major Crime Unit and the Monmouth County Prosecutor's Office announced that newly examined DNA evidence linked the 1965 death of Mary Agnes Klinsky to Zarinsky. Klinsky was raped and beaten to death. Her naked body was found near Telegraph Hill Park in Holmdel, New Jersey on September 16, 1965.

=== Zarinsky's death ===
On November 28, 2008, before he could stand trial for the Durrua murder, Zarinsky died at the South Woods State Prison in Bridgeton, New Jersey, aged 68, of pulmonary fibrosis.

== See also ==
- Crime in New Jersey
- List of murder convictions without a body
- List of serial killers in the United States
