= List of unsolved murders in the United Kingdom (before 1970) =

This is an incomplete list of unsolved murders in the United Kingdom that were committed before 1970, the earliest being in 1536. The list excludes any murders in Northern Ireland related to The Troubles, or that are related to IRA bombings which occurred in England.

Victims believed to have been killed by the same perpetrator(s) are grouped together below.

== Before 1800 ==
Year	Victim(s)	Location of body or bodies	Notes
1536	Robert Pakington	London	The slaying of Pakington was considered the first instance of murder committed using a handgun in London.
1678	Edmund Berry Godfrey	Primrose Hill	Godfrey was strangled and posthumously impaled on his own sword. Both killer(s) and motive(s) are unknown.
1752	Colin Roy Campbell of Glenure	Appin, Argyll	Known as the Appin Murder, the murder of Colin Roy Campbell of Glenure took place at Appin, in the west of Scotland, in the aftermath of the Jacobite rising of 1745. It inspired events in Robert Louis Stevenson's novel Kidnapped.
1759	George Burrington	St. James's Park, Westminster	The body of Burrington, former Governor of North Carolina, was retrieved from the canal in St. James's Park on 22 February 1759. He had been beaten and robbed.

== 1800–1899 ==
Year	Victim(s)	Location of body or bodies	Notes
1837	Eliza Davis	Marylebone, London	Davis, 21, was found with her throat cut at the King's Arms public house on Frederick Street, near Regent's Park, on 9 May 1837. Her killer may have gone on to murder Eliza Grimwood in 1838.
1838	Eliza Grimwood	Waterloo, London	Grimwood, 28, was found with her throat cut and abdomen ripped in her bedroom at 12 Wellington Terrace, off Waterloo Road, on 27 May 1838. Grimwood, a prostitute, accompanied her suspected murderer, described as a "well-dressed foreigner", to a theatre the previous evening. Both went to her home at around midnight. Grimwood may have been murdered by the person who killed Eliza Davis in 1837.
1857	Emile L'Angelier	Glasgow	L'Angelier was killed in Glasgow in 1857. His secret lover Madeleine Smith was prosecuted on a charge of poisoning him with arsenic, but the verdict was "not proven".
1861	Martha Halliday	Kingswood, Surrey	55-year-old Halliday was murdered when burglars broke into Kingswood Rectory on the night of 10 June 1861. Halliday, the wife of the parish clerk, was minding the rectory while the vicar and his family were away. Bound and gagged during the burglary, she died from suffocation. Three German men were suspects and one of them, Johann Carl Franz, stood trial for Halliday's murder but was found not guilty.
1863	Emma Jackson	St Giles, London	28-year-old Jackson was a prostitute found dead in a brothel bedroom at 4 George Street, St Giles, on 9 April 1863. Her throat was cut, and she had been stabbed. Jackson had entered the house with a suspect, a man, at around 7:00 that morning. Despite several witnesses seeing them together, the suspect was never found.
March 1866	Janet Rogers	Mount Stewart Farm, near Perth, Scotland	Rogers, 55, was clubbed to death with an axe while visiting her brother Charles Henderson at his farm on 30 March 1866. Ploughman James Crichton was charged with her murder, but at the trial, the jury returned a verdict of "not proven".
April 1866	Sarah Millson	City of London	51-year-old Millson was murdered on 11 April 1866 in a warehouse at 2 Cannon Street, where she worked as a housekeeper. She had been heard answering the door to an unknown person during the evening, and her body was found later that evening by another occupant of the building. She had been bludgeoned to death. A man named William Smith was acquitted of Millson's murder. Reportedly, many blamed the City of London Police for poor investigation.
1871	Jane Clouson	Attacked in Eltham, London, died at Guy's Hospital	17-year-old Clouson was found with serious head injuries on Kidbrooke Lane, Eltham, in the early hours of 26 April 1871. She died on 30 April and was two months pregnant at the time. Clouson's boyfriend, Edmund Pook, was first tried for her murder at a coroner's trial and found guilty of wilful murder. At a full trial, however, he was found not guilty after Clouson's supposed deathbed statements were ruled as hearsay evidence instead of dying declarations.
July 1872	Sarah and Christiana Squires	Hoxton, London	In a murder known as the Hoxton Horror, 77-year-old Sarah Squires and her 36-year-old daughter Christiana were killed at the print shop they owned at 46 Hyde Road, Hoxton, at around midday on 10 July 1872. Both women were brutally attacked with a hammer, and their home was ransacked. The incident followed an attempted burglary at their shop a few days previously. No one was ever charged with their murders.
December 1872	Harriet Buswell	Bloomsbury, London	31-year-old Buswell was a prostitute found with her throat cut in her room at 12 Great Coram Street on 25 December 1872. She was murdered by a client who police believed was ship chaplain Dr. Gottfried Hessell, a visiting German. Hessell was arrested, but the case was dismissed because he had an alibi for the time of Buswell's death.
1873–1889	Elizabeth Jackson and four unidentified victims	River Thames and other locations around London	A police officer found the left side of a woman's torso in mud off a South London waterworks area on 5 September 1873. The right side was found floating near Brunswick Wharf the following day. Four more bodies would be found in or near London in the same fashion over the next 16 years. The murders became known as the Thames Torso Murders.
1876	Charles Bravo	Balham, London	Bravo, a 30-year-old lawyer, was poisoned with antimony in April 1876 in a murder known as the Charles Bravo Murder or the Murder at the Priory. It took him three days to die, but he gave no indication of who the poisoner was. This led some to theorize that he had been trying to slowly poison his wife but instead poisoned himself by mistake. No one was ever charged with Bravo's murder.
1878	Matilda Hacker	Bloomsbury, London	An errand boy found the mummified remains of 67-year-old Hacker in the cellar of 4 Euston Square on 9 May 1879. Her hands were bound and she had been strangled by a rope left around her neck. Her disappearance had not been noticed as she often moved lodgings and used aliases to avoid paying rates on properties she had inherited. A housemaid who had pawned Hacker's jewellery was tried at the Old Bailey in June 1879 but found not guilty. The housemaid blamed her ex-lover, Hacker's landlord, for the murder; he was also tried and found not guilty, but sentenced was for perjury after denying the affair in the June trial.
December 1878	Rachel Samuel	Bloomsbury, London	74-year-old Samuel was found dead in her kitchen at 4 Burton Crescent (now Cartwright Gardens) on 11 December 1878. She had been beaten, and some coins, her wedding ring and her boots were missing. Former servant Mary Donovan was arrested, but the case against her was dismissed for lack of evidence.
September 1881	P.C. Fred Atkins	Kingston Hill, Kingston, Surrey	Police constable 356 V Fred Atkins was shot in September 1881 while on patrol at a house known as The Knoll, in Kingston Hill, Kingston. Frank Blackwell, whose initials were found on an altered file used as a burglar's tool and whose footprints matched the killer's, was detained by police but released for lack of evidence.
December 1881	Lucy Sands	Workington, Cumbria	A stonebreaker discovered the vermin-eaten remains of 16-year-old Sands under a pile of cobblestones in the Northside area of Workington at about 10 a.m. on 1 March 1882. Sands had last been seen on 1 December 1881, and a youth she was thought to have met that evening was tried for her murder and cleared. Although the Sands case officially remains unsolved, a man speaking to the BBC in 2025 claimed to have solved it. A seven-part TV series titled The Ballad of Lucy Sands is based on many years of research by him, and delves into the victim's life and what might have motivated the crime.
1884	Annie Yates	Bloomsbury, London	Yates, believed to be 23, was a prostitute who was murdered by a customer at 12 Burton Crescent (now Cartwright Gardens), Bloomsbury, in the early hours of 9 March 1884. She was strangled and beaten, and her purse and a ring were taken. Yates's age and real name are unconfirmed.
April 1888	Emma Smith	Whitechapel, London	Smith, 45, went to her lodging house in the early hours of 3 April 1888 and told its deputy keeper that three men beat and robbed her in Osborn Street, Whitechapel. Supported by two fellow lodgers, she walked to the London Hospital to be treated. On 4 April, she died there from her injuries. Smith was the first victim of what would become known as the Whitechapel Murders.
August 1888	Martha Tabram	Whitechapel, London	Tabram, a 39-year-old prostitute, was stabbed 39 times, and her body was discovered on the first-floor landing of a building in George Yard (now Gunthorpe Street) on 7 August 1888. Jack the Ripper became a suspect, but some circumstances cause doubt: Tabram was with a soldier when she was last seen, and there were marked differences between her injuries and those sustained by the Ripper's five canonical victims.
August–November 1888	Mary Ann Nichols, Annie Chapman, Elizabeth Stride, Catherine Eddowes, Mary Jane Kelly	Whitechapel (Mary Ann Nichols and Elizabeth Stride), Spitalfields (Annie Chapman and Mary Jane Kelly) and the City of London (Catherine Eddowes)	Victims of Jack the Ripper
December 1888	John Gill	Bradford, West Yorkshire	Seven-year-old Gill's body was found behind Mellor Street in Manningham on 29 December 1888. His heart had been ripped out, his arms and legs cut off and his ears removed. Milkman William Barrett was arrested for the murder, but magistrates dismissed the charge. At least one contemporary newspaper suggested a connection to the Jack the Ripper murders, but a London doctor ruled it out.
February 1889	Louisa Smith	Lewisham, London	Smith, a prostitute, was found in Algernon Road, Lewisham, early on 10 February 1889. She had a fractured skull caused by a blow from a blunt instrument – probably a hammer – and died from her injuries in a workhouse infirmary in Lewisham on the night of 14 February.
July 1889	Alice McKenzie	Whitechapel, London	Jack the Ripper was an immediate suspect in the murder of 40-year-old McKenzie, a possible prostitute found dead with stab wounds in Castle Alley on 17 July 1889. However, because the wounds were not as savage as the ones on the bodies of most of his canonical victims, closer analysis made it seem less likely that he was the perpetrator.
January 1890	Amelia Jeffs	West Ham, London	15-year-old Jeffs, known as Millie, went missing on her way to a fried fish shop on Church Street, West Ham, on the evening of 31 January 1890. Her body was found on 14 February in a bedroom cupboard at number 126, Portway – an empty property in a row of recently built terraced houses. She had been strangled with her scarf.
February 1891	Frances Coles	Whitechapel, London	Coles, a prostitute, was 31 at the time of her death. The culprit may have been fleeing the scene when a policeman found her with her throat slit from ear to ear on 13 February 1891: the policeman also heard footsteps leaving the area, and blood was still flowing from Coles's throat. James Sadler, a 53-year-old seaman with whom Coles drank in public houses on 12 February, was charged with her murder, but doubts expressed about his guilt during her inquest led to a decision to acquit him. The final victim of the Whitechapel Murders, Coles is not widely believed to have died at Jack the Ripper's hands.
August 1891	Elsie Adeline Luke	Bath, Somerset	26-year-old Elsie Luke disappeared from her lodging house in August 1891, and her skeleton was found in a cave at nearby Hampton Down in September 1893; the skeleton was identified through wearing linen belonging to Luke's last employer, who had sacked her for theft. A former boyfriend of Luke's was charged with her murder in October 1893 on circumstantial evidence but found not guilty, and the real murderer remains unknown.
January 1898	Thomas Webb	Finchley, London	Webb, a 29-year-old head cowman, was fatally shot outside his cottage at College Farm, Finchley, on 29 January 1898. Before his death, he had a presentiment that one night he would be shot when looking around the farm.
December 1898	Mary Jane Voller	Barking, London	Five-year-old Voller, known as Little Jennie, vanished on 31 December 1898 during a shopping errand to a chandler's shop 50 yards from her home at 77 Harpour Road, Barking. Her father found her body in a flooded ditch later that night. She had been stabbed multiple times.
February 1899	Bertha Russ	Little Ilford, London	Six-year-old Russ was last seen talking to a youth near St. Barnabas' Church on Browning Road, East Ham, after attending Sunday school on the afternoon of 19 February 1899. Her body was found about a mile away in an upstairs cupboard of a newly constructed house on Lawrence Avenue, Little Ilford, on 5 March. She had been suffocated.

== 1900s ==
Year	Victim(s)	Location of body or bodies	Notes
June 1902	Rose Harsent	Peasenhall, Suffolk	Harsent's throat was slit during the early hours of 1 June 1902 at Providence House, where the pregnant 23-year-old was a servant. William Gardiner, a married man in his 40s who had supposedly had an affair with her, was twice tried inconclusively and then freed.
September 1905	Mary Money	Merstham, Surrey	21-year-old Money's body was found in a Merstham railway tunnel. A postmortem revealed that a scarf had been thrust into her mouth, and marks on the tunnel wall showed that she had been thrown to her death from a moving train.
October 1905	Elizabeth Peers	Liverpool	Ten-year-old Peers went missing while running an errand to a butcher's shop on Lodge Lane, Toxteth, on 28 October 1905. Her body was found the next morning on Toxteth's Cullen Street, a three-minute walk from her home on Wendell Street. She had been strangled. It is possible that the killer later murdered Margaret Kirby, a seven-year-old girl found dead in the city in 1908.
June 1906	Mary Anne Hogg	Camberley, Surrey	On the afternoon of 11 June 1906, two half-sisters were attacked in their home on London Road, Camberley. The younger sister, Caroline, 62, was resting upstairs when she heard screams from Mary, 68, downstairs. When Caroline went downstairs, she was attacked by a man with a weapon. Both women suffered head injuries, and their throats were cut. Mary died, but Caroline staggered out and alerted a neighbour. She survived despite her injuries. The Hogg sisters were known to be wealthy, but there was no sign of theft. A motive is still unclear.
September 1907	Emily Dimmock	Camden Town, London	In an incident known as the Camden Town Murder, 22-year-old Dimmock's throat was cut in her flat on St Paul's Road (now Agar Grove) while her boyfriend was away. She often worked as a prostitute when he was not around, and one of her regular clients, Robert Wood, was acquitted of her murder after a defence by Edward Marshall Hall.
January 1908	Margaret Kirby	Liverpool	Seven-year-old Kirby was led away by a man as she played with her brother and a friend on Farnworth Street, Kensington, on 6 January 1908. Her body was found on 15 August in a sack on Great Newton Street. An anonymous confession letter, purportedly from the killer, was sent to the police. The author claimed that he had been a lodger on Great Newton Street. He may have also murdered Elizabeth Peers in 1905.
August 1908	Caroline Luard	Ightham, Kent	Luard, 57, was shot in a summerhouse in a wood near Sevenoaks in a case known as the Seal Chart Murder. Her husband was informally accused and later committed suicide. A court shorthand writer at the trial of a man named John Dickman claimed years later that the defendant had been framed for a 1910 murder on a train because the authorities believed him to have been responsible for Luard's death. Dickman was hanged for the train shooting.
October 1908	Edwin "Teddy" Haskell	Salisbury	12-year-old Haskell had his throat slashed with a carving knife on the night of 31 October at his home on Meadow Road. Haskell's widowed mother Flora was tried twice at Wiltshire Assizes for his murder (he first trial ended in a hung jury and the second in her acquittal). She claimed throughout that she caught an intruder killing her son in a botched robbery, citing an unknown man who knew the boy by name but disappeared after the murder.
December 1908	Marion Gilchrist	Glasgow	Gilchrist, an 82-year-old woman who lived in the West End of Glasgow, was bludgeoned to death. Despite her affluence, only a diamond brooch was stolen. Oscar Slater was suspected because he went to America and tried to pawn a brooch. He was wrongfully convicted in 1909, and this conviction was quashed in 1928. Sir Arthur Conan Doyle was prominent in securing his release.
November 1909	George Harry Storrs	Gorse Hall, Stalybridge, Cheshire	Storrs, 49, owned Gorse Hall and was a prominent businessman in town. His business dealings would have caused him to make enemies. After a gun was fired at a window of the hall from outside on 10 September 1909, he had a bell installed on the roof that could be rung to alert police to intruders. On the night of 1 November 1909, an intruder entered the hall and, in a scuffle with Storrs, stabbed him 15 times. Two men were tried independently of each other for the killing, but neither was convicted.

== 1910s ==
Year	Victim(s)	Location of body or bodies	Notes
July 1910	Thomas Weldon Atherstone	Battersea, London	Atherstone, an actor in his late 40s, was shot dead in the yard of a property in Battersea on the evening of 16 July 1910. A man was seen fleeing the scene. Police speculated that the culprit was a burglar.
November 1910	Alexander Norval	Carlisle, Cumbria	Norval, a currier, discovered that his son had forged a cheque in his name. Nevertheless, he forgave him and lent him money to keep his betting business going. On 5 November 1910, 75-year-old Norval was bludgeoned to death in his warehouse on West Walls, Carlisle. His son was acquitted of murder in January 1911.
July 1911	Amy Reeves	Longcross, Chertsey Common, Surrey	Ten-year-old Reeves was last seen in the yard of her home in Longcross at 12:30 p.m. on 18 July 1911. Her body was found late that night by a pond, or "dip hole", about 200 yards from the residence. She had head injuries and had drowned. Reeves had been seen that morning with gardener Albert Hampton, a 16-year-old neighbour. Hampton was charged with Reeves's murder but discharged when the jury at the inquest gave a verdict of "wilful murder without evidence to show by whom committed".
October 1911	George Wilson	Lintz Green railway station, County Durham	The 59-year-old stationmaster was shot as he was returning home after closing his office at Lintz Green railway station. Although he did not die instantly, when questioned, Wilson could not say who the assailant was. Railway porter Samuel Atkinson was charged, but no evidence was offered against him in court.
October 1912	Jean Milne	Broughty Ferry, near Dundee	On 2 November 1912, 69-year-old Milne's body was found at the foot of the stairs of Elmgrove, her mansion in Broughty Ferry, after a postman had made police aware that her letters had been piling up. She had been battered with a poker and prodded with a carving fork 12 to 18 days previously, and nothing appeared to have been stolen except the money missing from her purse. A dustman claimed to have spotted a mystery man leaving the property and then re-entering it on 16 October, and a Canadian man was arrested in Maidstone in Kent before being taken to Dundee for a court hearing. Nobody was put on trial for the murder, though.
October 1913	Mary Speir Gunn	Portencross, North Ayrshire	51-year-old Gunn died and her sister and brother-in-law were injured when six shots were fired through the main living-room window of Northbank Cottage, Portencross, during the evening of 18 October 1913. No one was charged with the offence.
January 1914	William Starchfield	Haggerston, London	The body of Starchfield, aged five, was discovered beneath a seat in a third-class carriage of a train on the North London Railway on 8 January 1914. He had been strangled between 2:00 and 3:00 p.m. that day. A witness named Starchfield's father as the culprit, but the judge at his trial ordered the jury to return a verdict of not guilty when the witness had proved unreliable.
May 1914	David Ombler	Hull, East Yorkshire	Ombler, 71, was found dead in the back room of his greengrocer's shop on West Parade, off Spring Bank in Hull, on 30 May 1914. He had been beaten about the head, probably with a poker. Witnesses saw a stranger loitering near the shop at around the time of the murder, and it was surmised that the motive was theft.
April 1915	Margaret "Maggie" Nally	City of London	Seven-year-old Nally went out to buy sweets with her five-year-old cousin close to Edgware Road on the evening of 4 April 1915. Her cousin returned home alone, reporting that Nally had gone off with an "old man". Nally's body was found hours later in the ladies' waiting room at Aldersgate Station (now named Barbican tube station). She had died at around 10:00 p.m. and been raped and suffocated.
July 1917	Vera May Glasspool	Owslebury, Hampshire	The body of the 15-year-old scullery maid was found on 11 July 1917 in woodland close to Longwood House, her place of work. She had been strangled and stabbed. Suspicion centred on an army camp at Hazeley Down. The police offered a £50 reward for information that might lead to the arrest of the guilty party.
January 1919	John Bianchi	Newcastle	Bianchi, 18, was walking a young woman (his cousin and partner) to her workplace on 26 January 1919 when a man shot him in the abdomen before hitting the woman over the head with the gun. She escaped after playing dead and ran to Bianchi's family home to raise the alarm. A motive was never established, but Bianchi and his partner were in a lovers' lane when assailed, and police thought the gunman may have had a religion-fuelled desire to rid it of courting couples. (The lane was in Bigges Main, a former coalmining village near Wallsend.) Bianchi died in hospital in Newcastle the day after the attack.
June 1919	Mabel Greenwood	Kidwelly, Carmarthenshire	Harold Greenwood (1874–1929), a solicitor, was accused of poisoning his 47-year-old wife, Mabel, with arsenic. He was acquitted at Carmarthen Assizes in 1920 after a defence by Edward Marshall Hall.
July 1919	Bella Wright	Little Stretton, near Leicester	In an incident known as the Green Bicycle Case, 21-year-old Wright was shot dead soon after a sighting of her with a man riding a bicycle. A green bicycle was found in a canal, and its owner, Ronald Light (1885–1975), was traced. He stood trial but was found not guilty of the murder, primarily because his defence counsel, Sir Edward Marshall Hall KC, had him, in the witness box, admit to every allegation against him except owning a service revolver and killing Wright.

== 1920s ==
Year	Victim(s)	Location of body or bodies	Notes
January 1920	Florence Nightingale Shore	East Sussex	Florence Nightingale Shore, the 55-year-old goddaughter of Florence Nightingale, was found on a train at Bexhill, East Sussex, with serious head injuries. Her money and jewellery were missing. She died in hospital in Hastings a few days later.
February 1924	Vera Hoad	Chichester, West Sussex	The body of Hoad, an 11-year-old girl missing since failing to arrive home from a music lesson on 25 February 1924, was found on 28 February in a field belonging to a psychiatric hospital. She had been strangled. A blowtorch was used to release the body because it had become trapped in ice due to freezing weather conditions.
June 1926	James White	Nottingham	White ran into a tree and died at the foot of it on 30 June 1926, but a doctor found the impact not to have been the cause of his death, concluding that he collided with the tree in Acorn Wood and was then attacked with an instrument that fractured his skull as he lay on the ground in a dazed state. The collision occurred when 43-year-old White was fleeing after being spotted by a woman who was part of a couple he and two male companions were spying on.
10 February 1929	Kate Jackson	Attacked in Limeslade, Wales, died in hospital	43-year-old Jackson, an Englishwoman who had moved to the area with her husband to avoid recognition following his trial for embezzlement, was attacked shortly after departing from a meeting with a friend. She died from her injuries in hospital. Though Jackson's husband was tried for her murder, he was not convicted and the case remains unsolved.

== 1930s ==
Year	Victim(s)	Location of body or bodies	Notes
25 September 1930	Margery Wren	Ramsgate, Kent	Wren, a shopkeeper aged about 80, was battered with fireplace tongs in her store on Church Road, Ramsgate, before succumbing to her injuries at Ramsgate Hospital five days later. Though potential suspects were named by her, nobody was charged, and the case remains unsolved to this day.
7 January 1931	Evelyn Foster	Otterburn, Northumberland	28-year-old Foster ran a successful taxi business. On 6 January 1931, she picked up a young man wearing a bowler hat, tweed suit and overcoat who threw her into the back seat of her cab, covered her with a rug, doused her with petrol and ignited it. Foster managed to get out of the vehicle despite being badly burnt, and gave a description of her attacker after being found. She succumbed to her injuries the following day.
20 January 1931	Julia Wallace	Liverpool	This is a case known as the Wallace Case. The victim's husband, William Herbert Wallace, was convicted of killing her and sentenced to death, but his conviction was quashed after he appealed. Recent books have named another suspect.
21 June 1931	Hubert Chevis	Aldershot, Hampshire	Chevis, 28, was poisoned after eating partridge laced with strychnine.
14 December 1931	Vera Page	West Kensington, London	Ten-year-old Page's strangled body was found in the front garden of a house on Addison Road, West Kensington, on 16 December 1931. It was believed she was murdered elsewhere and then transferred to this location.
January 1932	Nancy Patterson	Silloth, Cumbria	28-year-old Patterson's body was found washed up at Silloth on 8 January 1932, but a pathologist ruled out drowning as the cause of death on account of bruises on her neck – bruises indicative of strangulation – and lack of water in her lungs. A verdict of murder against a person or persons unknown was accordingly returned at her inquest. Two men said they saw Patterson near Navvies Bridge at Workington (a Cumbrian town some 15 miles down the coast from Silloth) five days before she was found dead.
July 1932	Queenie Harman	St. Leonards-on-Sea, East Sussex	Queenie Winifred Harman (née Hicks), 17, was bludgeoned to death at her home. Her husband, Arthur Edward Harman, was formally accused but not convicted. He died 18 months later, aged 25, after wandering onto a railway line near Polegate. The case against Mr. Harman appears to have ended at the police court (magistrates' court) level, as detectives had no solid evidence. He worked for John Carter, a haulier, and went to work on that fateful day in July 1932. The police seemed to want the case closed rapidly and never followed any other possible leads.
October 1932	Albert and Annie Keen	Shackleford, Surrey	Albert Keen, 61, and his wife Annie, 54, were found dead on 8 October 1932. Annie was found with injuries to her head and throat in the scullery of their cottage close to Cutt Mill crossroads, while Albert, a farmhand, was found drowned and with head injuries in Cutt Mill Pond a little later. Police believed he had been killed before Annie. A murder-suicide was ruled out and a motive of theft was suspected instead because the couple had kept money in their home. A man stood trial for the Keens' murders but was acquitted after three days.
October 1932	Sidney Marston	Birmingham	21-year-old Marston was found dying of stab wounds in the front garden of 63 Willows Crescent, Cannon Hill, Birmingham, on the evening of 9 October 1932. Two teenage sisters stood trial for his murder; they claimed he had assaulted and attempted to rob them but denied killing him. During the trial, it was decided that there was no evidence that the two girls had committed the crime and the judge ordered the jury to return a not guilty verdict.
June 1934	Unidentified female	Brighton, Sussex	The murder of this woman, whose torso was found in a trunk at Brighton Station, is known as the Brighton Trunk Crime No. 1 (see Brighton trunk murders). In 2020, the BBC One documentary Dark Land: Hunting the Killers suggested that a man called George Shotton could have been the murderer. Shotton was posthumously named in 1961 as the killer of his wife Mamie Stuart.
August 1935	Minnie Lawson	Ogle, Northumberland	58-year-old Lawson was a widow who ran a shop from her home in the village of Ogle, Northumberland. Her body was found next to her bed in the ransacked cottage one day in August 1935. She had been beaten with a hammer and the bed had been set alight. A local man was charged with murder, but the case against him collapsed.
May 1938	William Murfitt	Risby, Suffolk	56-year-old Murfitt was poisoned with cyanide at his home, Quays Farm, on 17 May 1938. Suspicion fell on his housekeeper, but there was not enough evidence to charge anyone.
October 1938	Phyllis Hirst	Bradford, West Yorkshire	Eight-year-old Hirst was murdered on the evening of 28 October 1938 after she had been playing outside with a friend. Her body was found on a lane near All Saints' Church in Little Horton Green.
April 1939	George Stapleton	Greenfield, Bedfordshire	Stapleton, a farmworker aged 66, was bludgeoned with a fence post on 22 April 1939 while walking along a bridleway between Ruxox Farm and his home in Flitton, and his wages were stolen. The police report said the attacker had probably been waiting for him in nearby bushes.
September 1939	Joyce Cox	Cardiff	Four-year-old Cox vanished while walking home from school with her seven-year-old brother on 28 September 1939; her body was later found on a railway embankment in Coryton, Cardiff. A family member researching the case in the 2010s learned that the police's prime suspect had died in the 1950s.

== 1940s ==
Year	Victim(s)	Location of body or bodies	Notes
November 1940	Minnie "Peggy" Stott	Bolton, Lancashire	17-year-old Stott went out for the evening on 16 November 1940 and her body was found by a police officer shortly before midnight in the yard of Parker's Garage, through an archway on Bradshawgate, Bolton. She had been strangled with her scarf and sexually assaulted. There had been various sightings of Stott during the evening, but no firm leads emerged. It was suggested years later that the investigating police officers had traced the crime to a man who committed suicide before he could be arrested, but this has not been substantiated.
April 1943	Wych Elm Bella	Wychbury Hill, near Hagley, Worcestershire	A boy out with three friends on 18 April 1943 discovered the skeletal remains of a woman inside a hollow tree. Police established that she had died approximately 18 months earlier but could not identify her. In 1944, the message "Who put Bella in the Wych Elm? – Hagley Wood" was found painted on a wall in Birmingham. Various theories about the identity of the victim and her killer have been proposed.
August 1943	Mabel Harper	Cardiff	53-year-old Harper was attacked while walking home from visiting friends on the night of 12 August 1943. Next day her body was found gagged, stripped and with facial injuries on a grass verge on Western Avenue, and her attaché case and handbag were missing.
September 1943	Louisa Price	The Wrekin, Shropshire	18-year-old Price, a private from Birkenhead on Merseyside, went to a dance for soldiers at a pavilion in the Shropshire countryside on 8 September 1943 and was beaten to death with a rock or rocks that night after heading outdoors. She was found approximately 200 yards from the pavilion the following day. No charges relating to Price's murder have been filed since the acquittal in November 1943 of an American sergeant tried in England by a US court martial.
November 1943	Norah Bartlett	Swansea	The body of 33-year-old Bartlett was found on the evening of 18 November 1943 in a lane close to her home on Rhyddings Park Road, Brynmill, Swansea. She had been strangled, and it was reported that she had last been seen in the company of an American soldier.
September 1944	Ruth Schmerler	Counslow, Staffordshire	20-year-old Schmerler, a Polish Jew who had arrived in England as a refugee in June 1939, was found dead in a gravel pit at Counslow, near Cheadle, by a 12-year-old girl picking blackberries with her mother. Although the hitchhiking victim had died as a result of being stabbed and had three wounds from the weapon (probably a bayonet), three bruises were present too: one on the chin, one on the right jaw, and one near the Adam's apple suggesting a strangulation attempt. A detective chief inspector thought the culprit might have lost his temper and killed her because she had rejected his sexual advances.
February 1945	Charles Walton	Meon Hill, near Upper Quinton, Warwickshire	Walton, a 74-year-old local farm labourer, was found murdered on the slopes of Meon Hill on Valentine's Day 1945, pinned to the ground by a pitchfork and with at least four inches of the tip of his own billhook embedded in his neck. There were also head injuries where he had been beaten with his walking stick. Rumours circulated linking the killing to witchcraft.
October 1945	Caroline Evans	Coedpoeth, Wrexham	Evans, a 38-year-old schoolmistress, was last seen alive on the evening of 6 October 1945 and found strangled the following day next to a path through Pant Tywyll which she had taken on her way to visit her mother at the City Arms pub in Minera.
December 1945	Betty Hadden	Aberdeen	A severed arm was found on the foreshore at Torry, Aberdeen, on the morning of 12 December 1945. Fingerprint analysis revealed that it had belonged to Elizabeth "Betty" Hadden, a local 17-year-old girl; she had previously been arrested for shoplifting and police had kept her fingerprints on file. Hadden was last seen on 11 December and there were reports of screams being heard in the early hours of 12 December. The rest of her remains were never found.
May 1946	Robert Parrington Jackson	Bristol	The 33-year-old manager of the Odeon cinema in Union Street, Bristol, was shot on 29 May 1946 during a showing of the movie The Light that Failed. About 2,000 people were in the cinema watching the film when he was shot twice in his office, but they were unaware of the attack. Jackson died later in hospital. Theft was a suggested motive, but the money in the safe was left untouched. In 1993, a man claimed that his father, a criminal named Billy "The Fish" Fisher, confessed to the murder on his deathbed in 1989.
June 1946	Muriel Drinkwater	Penllergaer, near Swansea	Drinkwater, a 12-year-old schoolgirl, was bludgeoned about the head, raped and shot in the woods at Penllergaer, a village a few miles from Swansea. The case came to be known as the Little Red Riding Hood Murder. In 2020, the BBC One documentary Dark Land: Hunting the Killers suggested that Ronnie Harries could have been the murderer. Harries was hanged in 1954 for the double murder of John and Phoebe Harries, a husband and wife who were distantly related to him.
July 1946	Sheila Martin	Fawkham, Kent	11-year-old Martin was murdered early in the evening on 7 July 1946. She had last been seen at 4:30 p.m. and her body was found early the following morning in Stony Field Wood (also known as Sun Hill Wood), Fawkham Green. Martin had been strangled with her hair ribbon and it was believed she had died between 5:00 and 6:00 p.m. on 7 July.
November 1946	Margaret Cook	Soho, London	26-year-old Cook was shot dead in a narrow passage near the entrance to the Blue Lagoon, a nightclub in Carnaby Street, Soho. She worked at the club as an "exotic dancer". Nobody was ever charged with Cook's murder, but Scotland Yard detectives interviewed a man in 2015 after he confessed to it.
February 1948	Evan Harris	Swansea	71-year-old Harris was a retired industrial chemist who was a nightwatchman at Swansea's Consolidated Fisheries. His body was found in the company's dry dock at South Dock on the morning of 28 February 1948. Although Harris had died from drowning, murder was suspected when signs of a struggle were discovered in a nearby boilermaker's shop.
April 1948	Jerzy Strzadla	Aberdare, Glamorgan	32-year-old Strzadla, a Polish miner, was stabbed over 40 times in a robbery in Aberdare Park on 19 April 1948. Money and his watch were stolen.
July 1948	Joan Woodhouse	Arundel, West Sussex	27-year-old Woodhouse's body was found partially clothed near Swanbourne Lake, Arundel Park, on 10 August 1948. She had been strangled and was believed to have died on 31 July. The London librarian had travelled by train from the city to Worthing, despite telling friends she would be travelling to Barnsley in Yorkshire to see family, and it was thought that a man had accompanied her on the journey to Worthing or that she had met him at the town's railway station. The man who reported finding Woodhouse dead was charged with her murder but acquitted before he was due to stand trial. Woodhouse's family subsequently began a private prosecution against him, and he was charged again and then cleared. In 1956, police questioned a suspect who had moved to Rhodesia; however, the case remained unsolved. A book written about it asserts that the man who claimed to have found Woodhouse's body was the culprit and that he was protected from prosecution.
November 1948	Terence McNamara	Middlesbrough, North Yorkshire	22-month-old McNamara was subjected to a sexual assault and died in his home at 46 Richmond Street, Middlesbrough, while his mother Irene was out at work on 12 November 1948. His father Raymond had died in 1947. A next-door neighbour of the couple in charge of watching McNamara claimed in 1955 that she had overheard the woman threaten to tell all about what her boyfriend had done if he ever left her. Born in 1922 and the suspect in McNamara's case, the boyfriend had a criminal record and lived to be in his 80s.
January 1949	Ernest Melville	Swansea	Two girls playing on a bomb site on Croft Street, Swansea, on 22 January 1949 came across the body of 38-year-old Melville; he had been battered to death with bricks. Melville had last been seen the previous evening, drinking in the Full Moon pub on High Street. He was homosexual and police believed this was a reason for his murder.
March 1949	Leonard Thomas and Bernard Catterall	Liverpool	Thomas, 44, and Catterall, 30, were shot in an upstairs office of the Cameo Cinema in Wavertree, Liverpool, on 19 March 1949. Thomas was the manager of the cinema and Catterall was his assistant, and the person(s) responsible for their deaths also stole a little over £50. Although there was no forensic evidence against them or any eyewitnesses to place them at the scene, two men in their 20s – George Kelly and Charles Connolly – were charged and tried separately, following which Kelly was hanged and Connolly avoided the death penalty by agreeing to plead guilty to robbery. In 2003, after it was observed in the Appeal Court that the men's defence teams were not informed of a prosecution witness's claim that a man other than Kelly or Connolly confessed to the double murder to him, the convictions were judged to be unsafe and accordingly were quashed.
April 1949	Emily Armstrong	St John's Wood, London	On 14 April 1949, 69-year-old Armstrong's head was struck at least 22 times with a blunt object thought to have been a hammer or a heavy spanner. The location of the offence was the dry-cleaning shop she managed on St John's Wood High Street, and the time of it was established to have been an hour to two hours before her body was found in the shop at around 4:00 p.m.
June 1949	Gertrude O'Leary	Stokes Croft, Bristol	64-year-old O'Leary was beaten and strangled to death in her off-licence on Thomas Street, Stokes Croft, on 30 June 1949. It was determined that a gold watch and a jewelled pendant were missing, suggesting theft as the motive. Despite an intensive investigation, the killer was never found.

== 1950s ==
Year	Victim(s)	Location of body or bodies	Notes
November 1950	Andrew Paterson Drury	Dundee	The 28-year-old machinist was stabbed and robbed in the Stannergate area of Dundee. His stolen belongings were discovered wrapped in a towel in the bed of a Pathan seaman who had been charged already because a knife had been found in a box he owned, and the seaman's trial began in January 1951. However, the judge there cautioned the jury to be mindful that the items could have been planted in the seaman's bed to make it appear as though he had committed the murder, and a "not proven" verdict was returned.
July 1951	Christine Butcher	Windsor, Berkshire	Seven-year-old Butcher vanished on 8 July 1951 when she went to see the boxer Sugar Ray Robinson, who was staying at Windsor's Star and Garter Hotel ahead of his fight on 10 July with Randy Turpin at Earl's Court, London. Butcher's body was found two days later in a meadow close to Windsor Castle. She had been raped and strangled.
November 1951	Edwin Youll	Middlesbrough, North Yorkshire	Youll, a 43-year-old taxi driver, was shot and beaten to death during an evening attack in Ladgate Lane on 16 November 1951, and his taxi was then driven to and abandoned in Middlesbrough town centre with all of his takings still in it. The day after the murder, a cleaner on duty at Waterloo Station in London found a torn piece of paper with handwriting describing the crime and giving two details about it that were yet to be revealed to the public – namely that two people had committed it and had done so in the vicinity of the Blue Bell Hotel.
March 1952	Lily Volpert	Cardiff	41-year-old Volpert was found dead with a cut throat in her shop, Volpert's Clothing Store, in the docklands area of Cardiff, on 6 March 1952. Mahmood Hussein Mattan was found guilty of her murder and hanged in September 1952. After a campaign to clear his name, Mattan's conviction was quashed in 1998, and Volpert's murderer has not been caught.
November 1952	Patricia Curran	Whiteabbey, County Antrim, Northern Ireland	Curran, 19, was found stabbed to death in the grounds of her father's estate house on 13 November 1952. Her father was a High Court judge. Iain Hay Gordon, a 20-year-old Scottish airman stationed in Northern Ireland, confessed to the killing and at trial was found guilty but insane. In 2000, 40 years after his release from a psychiatric hospital, the Court of Appeal agreed that Gordon's confession was inadmissible as it had been tainted by controversially aggressive interview techniques employed by police. With the other evidence against him not being strong enough to stand on its own, the verdict was overturned and the Curran case became unsolved.
January 1953	Elizabeth Thomas	Attacked in Laugharne, Carmarthenshire, died in hospital in Carmarthen	Thomas, 78, died the morning after she was beaten with a stick and stabbed in her Clifton Street cottage on the evening of 10 January. Because people claimed to have seen him near her home that evening, a local deaf and mute man was quizzed by police and then charged following an apparent confession. However, a jury was directed to find him not guilty when the prosecution announced that it was to offer no further evidence.
January 1954	Penelope Mogano	Coventry, Warwickshire	44-year-old Mogano was found deceased in a chair in her dining room, her face and tongue slashed with a carving knife and her skull smashed to pieces by hammer blows. The killer(s) did not ransack, steal, or sexually assault her while at the property. Detectives wondered whether both Mogano's murder and an earlier incident in which the pantry of a nearby home was set alight had a shared perpetrator with an attitude of contempt towards the old-time dancing that the victim, her husband, and the owner of that residence were involved in, but the line of inquiry into this theory led to a dead end. Another line of inquiry that led nowhere concerned a bogus official who called at a house less than 200 yards from Mogano's on the day she was killed, saying he was there to inspect the electricity meter before making sexual advances to the woman who answered the door to him. Neighbours of Mogano told detectives of frequent afternoon trips from her home in the weeks preceding her murder, but where she went or whom she met on each of those occasions was not established. In all, over 25,000 statements were taken by police as they investigated the crime.
April 1954	Olive May Bennett	Stratford-upon-Avon, Warwickshire	45-year-old Bennett was seen drinking alone in the Red Horse Hotel in Bridge Street, Stratford, on Saturday 24 April 1954. Her body was discovered wedged against an obstruction on the bank of the River Avon the following morning. She had been strangled with a long woollen scarf and her body weighed down with a 56-pound tombstone wrenched from a riverside churchyard. Two women told police in 1962 that on the night of the murder, they were in the churchyard with two men and one of the men threatened to push them into the river and weigh them down with a tombstone. Neither man was traced.
September 1954	Jean Townsend	Ruislip, Middlesex	21-year-old Townsend was found murdered on wasteland between South Ruislip Underground station and her home on 15 September 1954. She had been strangled with a silk scarf. In 1982, the Metropolitan Police announced that they were to review their files on the case following some anonymous telephone calls. Britain's National Archives has indicated that the files are likely to be made available for public inspection in 2031.
September 1955	Alice Barton	Birkenhead, Merseyside	A schoolboy found the strangled and mutilated body of Barton, 49, in a wartime pillbox near the Woodchurch estate, Birkenhead, on 24 September 1955. Barton had been a prostitute and had been known to take her clients to the pillbox. A local woman later shared her suspicion that her deceased grandfather may have been responsible for the murder.
May 1956	Margaret and Mary Ormesher	Ormskirk, Lancashire	Margaret and Mary Ormesher, two sisters in their 60s, were bludgeoned to death at their home in Ormskirk on the night of 5/6 May 1956. Mary ran a sweet shop in the small market town. Despite national media coverage and an extensive investigation in which all of the adult male population of Ormskirk were fingerprinted, the identity or identities of the murderer or murderers has/have never been established.
September 1956	Diana Suttey	Leverstock Green, Hertfordshire	36-year-old Suttey's body was found in bushes in Green Lane, Leverstock Green, near Hemel Hempstead, on 7 September 1956. She had been throttled with a scarf. Police thought Suttey had died at the hands of a man with whom she had been having secret meetings and that a quarrel about another lover might have preceded the murder.
September 1956	Jean Chalinder	Cardiff	33-year-old Chalinder, from Roath, was murdered while picking blackberries. Her body was found in a ditch at Llyn-y-Grant Farm on 20 September 1956, five days after she had gone missing. Chalinder had died from head injuries and police said the crime appeared to have been motiveless.
April 1957	Fred Jeffs	Birmingham	When Jeffs was found murdered in a spinney between Handsworth and West Bromwich on 19 April 1957 (Good Friday), his pockets were empty and more than £150 in cash, along with a watch and a radio, had been stolen from his sweet and tobacco shop at 12 Stanley Road, Quinton, Birmingham. Suspicion was that an unknown woman had lured 37-year-old Jeffs to a location where a male accomplice then proceeded to beat him over the head with a lorry starter handle. A dark-haired young woman had been spotted getting into his van outside his shop on 18 April, and her appearance matched that of someone to whom he had silently mouthed that he would see later while she was in the shop about four hours previously.
May 1957	Teresa Łubieńska	Attacked in South Kensington, London, died in hospital	Łubieńska was a 73-year-old Polish countess who had been a lieutenant in the Polish Underground Army and survived two concentration camps. She was fatally stabbed on the eastbound Piccadilly line platform at Gloucester Road tube station on the evening of 24 May 1957, and her attacker was never caught.
June 1957	Emily Pye	Halifax, West Yorkshire	White-haired 80-year-old Pye had been running her grocery shop in Gibbet Street, Halifax for 30 years. When her niece called on her on 8 June 1957, she found her aunt's body in a crumpled heap in the living quarters at the back of the shop. She had been battered to death with a fireside poker and had a fractured skull. Police immediately thought theft was the motive when they discovered that a few pounds were missing from the till. Detectives appealed to local people for information, but out of the town's population of around 97,000, just four responded with leads, which came to nothing. The murder remains unsolved as of today.
June 1957	June and Royston Sheasby	Bristol	June Sheasby was seven years old and her brother Royston was five when the pair left their home in Brockworth Crescent, Stapleton, to visit some horses on 20 June 1957. They never returned home and after a large search, their bodies were found on 1 July in undergrowth near the River Frome in Snuff Mills Park. Both children had suffered head injuries. In 1964, a Home Office psychiatrist stated that a deceased prisoner jailed for a minor offence had confessed to him that he had killed two children. The psychiatrist did not name the prisoner or confirm if he had been referring to the Sheasby children.
December 1957	Anne Noblett	Whitwell, Hertfordshire	On the night of 30 December 1957, 17-year-old Noblett alighted from a bus on the corner of Lower Luton Road and Cherry Tree Lane in Wheathampstead and began the short walk home to Marshalls Heath. A month later her strangled and partially disrobed body was found seven miles away in Rose Grove Wood near Whitwell. Known as the Deep Freeze Murder, mystery surrounds the circumstances of the killing, due to Noblett's body being found in a frozen condition notwithstanding the relatively mild weather at the time. Despite extensive enquiries, her killer has never been caught.
January 1958	Mary Kriek	Boxted, Essex	Kriek, a 19-year-old Dutch au pair, was beaten with a tyre lever after waving goodbye to a friend still on the bus she had just alighted from. It was 10:45 p.m. on 5 January 1958 when Kriek got off the bus as it passed through Eight Ash Green – the village where the family she was staying with lived and a place some 14 miles from where her body would be found early the next day. A link with the murder of Anne Noblett was suspected.
April 1958	Susan Southgate	Writtle, near Chelmsford, Essex	A duster was stuffed into the 83-year-old's mouth, and she was then gagged with insulation tape while the duster was still in there, tied to a chair (left in a turn of the stairs after getting stuck as it was being carried up with her in it) and burgled on 17 April 1958. One of the culprits later called the police from a phone box in Barking to make a request for officers to go to Southgate's house and release her, but she had suffocated to death by the time she was found.
June 1958	Harry Baker	High Legh, Cheshire	61-year-old Baker was last seen talking to a man on Strand Road, Bootle, at 1:45 p.m. on 5 June 1958. His body was found 18 days later, on 23 June, wrapped in two sacks in woods at High Legh, near Knutsford. He had been beaten, strangled and robbed. The search for Baker's killer was one of the biggest ever manhunts on Merseyside.
April 1959	Carol Ann Stephens	Horeb, near Llanelli, Carmarthenshire	Six-year-old Stephens left her home on Malefant Street, Cardiff, to play outside on 7 April 1959. She never returned home, and her body was found two weeks later in a river culvert near the village of Horeb, north of Llanelli. She had been suffocated before being dumped in the water. Police made a new appeal for information on the 60th anniversary of Stephens's death in 2019. In 2020, the BBC One documentary Dark Land: Hunting the Killers suggested that confectionery salesman Ronald Murray could have been the murderer.
1959–1965	1959: Elizabeth Figg; 1963: Gwynneth Rees; 1964: Hannah Tailford, Irene Lockwood, Helene Barthelemy, Mary Fleming and Margaret McGowan; 1965: Bridget O'Hara	West London	Victims of Jack the Stripper, the perpetrator of the Hammersmith nude murders
August 1959	Florence Gooding	Attacked in Oxted, Surrey, died at Wimbledon Hospital in London	Gooding, 75, was found badly beaten in her bed at her home on Oast Road, Oxted, on 4 August 1959. She died the following day. It is reported that 40 years after Gooding's death, a detective recalled that the main suspect had died before he could be interviewed.
August 1959	Miles Vallint	Croydon, London	11-year-old Vallint was last seen alive at a shop in Croydon on 27 August 1959, having travelled to the area by bus from near his home in South Norwood to choose a bicycle for his 12th birthday. On 28 August he was found strangled on the site of a demolished vicarage on Croydon's Tavistock Road.

== 1960s ==
Year	Victim(s)	Location of body or bodies	Notes
January 1960	Lilian Tharme	Poole, Dorset	44-year-old mother-of-four Tharme was killed in the early hours of 17 January 1960 after attending a Territorial Army dance without her husband, who had stayed at home. Her clothes were later found scattered along the main road at Wallisdown before her naked body was found in the snow on Wheelers Lane, about a mile away. Several feet from the body was a car that had been stolen in nearby Bournemouth, and police reports indicated that Tharme had been hit by the car and then sexually assaulted.
January 1960	Eva Booth	Hartley, Plymouth, Devon	The 71-year-old widow was found deceased with head injuries in an airing cupboard of her home on 25 January 1960.
December 1960	Ronald Coomber	Ilford, London	Coomber, 29, was fatally stamped on in the neck in the grounds of the Ranch House Club on Ashurst Drive, Ilford, on 23 December 1960. He had been drinking in the club and was followed outside after getting into an argument with its owner and punching him. Four men were acquitted over Coomber's death and awarded compensation.
January 1961	Linda Smith	Polstead, Suffolk	12-year-old Smith was last seen in the main street of her village (Earls Colne in Essex) on 16 January 1961. A retired farmworker found her body in the Suffolk countryside four days later, and wrapped tightly around the neck was the scarf that had been used to strangle her (her own school scarf). There has never been an arrest in connection with this murder.
January 1961	Dorothy Mills	West Bromwich, West Midlands	Mills, a 32-year-old local government filing clerk, left her home one evening and was found battered to death the day after (22 January) in the grounds of a tennis club where she was a champion player. The home was shared with her adoptive parents. Mills's autopsy revealed that she was three months pregnant when she died, and that the blows from the murder weapon – believed to have been a hammer – caused her skull to shatter into 13 pieces.
April 1961	Patrick Mulligan	Worcester	When Mulligan, 22, was seen staggering and then collapsing in the street close to midnight on Saturday 8 April 1961, it was found that it was because he had been stabbed, and he soon died from his wound. The stabbing had taken place in public toilets on an adjoining road. A 39-year-old vagrant was cleared of Mulligan's murder after a senior transport policeman had stated in court that he had seen the vagrant at a railway station many miles from Worcester that night.
December 1961	Maureen Dutton	Liverpool	27-year-old Dutton died in the presence of her sons (both under three years of age) when she was stabbed in their home on Thingwall Lane, Knotty Ash within four weeks of giving birth to the younger of the two. The perpetrator did not steal anything from the house and appeared to have gained entry to it by Dutton opening the front door. Three people who remain unidentified became suspects: a young male bogus doctor who had visited a woman at her Halewood address to offer postnatal care, a young man seen running along Greystone Road (which adjoins Thingwall Lane) and vomiting outside the church at the junction with Court Hey Avenue, and a young Irishwoman heard muttering to herself on a bus that she had to leave Liverpool as a matter of urgency, had "done something terrible" and was going to catch a plane from London.
July 1962	Olive Duncan	Hammersmith, London	61-year-old Duncan smashed a window of her flat in Sulgrave Gardens, Hammersmith, at around 12:30 a.m. on 18 July 1962 – prompting neighbours to come to her aid – despite her wrists having been bound by an assailant. Acute fear then caused her to die of heart failure. The male assailant had left the flat before the arrival of any of Duncan's neighbours after gaining access to it via the transom toilet window, using a piece of rag or pillow slip to tie her hands together, and raping her.
October 1962	Annie O'Donnell	Clerkenwell, London	Murdered on 12 October 1962 at her Roman Catholic shop in Victoria Dwellings, Clerkenwell, 74-year-old O'Donnell was bludgeoned and the premises were ransacked before a small string bag with money inside was taken away. Because fingerprints said to be his were discovered on paper in the shop and he was identified as being outside there on the evening of the killing, an 18-year-old butcher was charged, despite appearing to have a good alibi. Placed on trial for murder three times in 1963, he was finally released from custody when no evidence against him was presented at the last hearing.
August 1963	Stanley Blackmore	Yetminster, Dorset	The 66-year-old taxi driver went missing after dropping a soldier off at Pen Mill railway station in Yeovil and was found stabbed to death eight days later in a ditch at nearby Yetminster.
September 1963	George Wilson	Nottingham	42-year-old Wilson's wife found him dying in a pool of blood when she opened the side door of Sneinton's Fox & Grapes pub (of which he was the landlord) after hearing their dog barking and scratching at it from outside. A pathologist counted 14 stab wounds on the body of the victim, who was attacked on 8 September while out with the dog for a nighttime stroll.
September 1963	Linda Cook	Redcar, North Yorkshire	On 21 September 1963, Cook, a 22-year-old planning to leave town in two days following a separation from her husband, was staying at a friend's flat in Redcar but never returned after telling him she was going to see her ex-employer. A milk lorry driver found her strangled to death in Green Lane the next day. Police interviewed thousands of people about Cook's murder, but the information given to them during those interviews failed to enable them to build up a detailed picture of the Redcar woman's last movements.
October/November 1963	Katherine Lilian Armstrong	Newcastle	70-year-old Armstrong was a retired headteacher who had worked at Denton Road Junior School in Newcastle and was known by her middle name. Her body was found in her house on Goldspink Lane, Sandyford, Newcastle, on 1 November 1963. She had been stabbed 28 times and had a nylon stocking tied around her neck, as well as defensive wounds on her hands. There was no sign of forced entry.
May 1964	Charles Griffiths	Southport, Lancashire	84-year-old Griffiths was discovered battered to death in his house at 7 Bridge Street on 4 May 1964. Local residents were urged by police two days later to search their gardens and footpaths for his missing wallet.
May 1964	Anne Dunwell	Near Maltby, South Yorkshire	13-year-old Dunwell was found dead on a manure heap – naked, strangled and sexually assaulted – on 7 May 1964. It is believed she was killed the night before after leaving her aunt's house to catch a bus to be with her grandmother. Despite a DNA breakthrough being made by 2006, the murderer has never been identified.
June 1964	Yvonne Laker	Basingstoke, Hampshire	15-year-old Laker was found dead in a toilet cubicle on a train travelling from Southampton to Reading on 29 June 1964. Her throat had been cut with a broken bottle. Laker's body was discovered as the train was leaving Basingstoke and her shoes and beret had been thrown from the train 10 miles south of Basingstoke. A man – who claimed to have seen the girl with her attacker – stood trial for her murder but was acquitted.
October 1964	Arthur Cope	Radcliffe-on-Trent, Nottinghamshire	Nothing was stolen from 56-year-old Cope's caravan at the time of his murder there in October 1964, and no motive other than theft was apparent either. The caravan was on a mobile home site on Wharf Lane, Radcliffe. Builders found a pair of bicycle handlebars from the crime scene during a renovation of a former police station in Newark in 2013, but they are not thought to have been what Cope was bludgeoned to death with.
April 1965	Florence Lewis	Wigmore, Kent	74-year-old Lewis was hit with a blunt object 14 times after opening the front door of her bungalow on Cambridge Road, Wigmore. The perpetrator might have targeted the residence because they were hoping to steal a large quantity of money they thought the widow had stored there somewhere.
September 1965	Sidney Leeson	Leicester	75-year-old Leeson was battered to death with a vase at his home in Leicester by someone he appeared to have let in. £23 was missing from a drawer that had been prised open, presumably by the attacker or an accomplice.
October 1965	Elsie Frost	Wakefield, West Yorkshire	14-year-old Frost's body was found with stab wounds on 9 October 1965. A subsequent investigation turned up one suspect, who was charged before being acquitted. After this, there was no further investigation, and details of the case were made exempt from Freedom of Information requests. Frost's siblings filed an FOI request when the original exemption date was coming to an end, only to find that the date had been extended to 2060. The case was reopened in 2015 after a series of reports on BBC Radio 4. In September 2016 – more than 50 years after the offence had been committed – Peter Pickering, a convicted child murderer in his late 70s, was arrested on suspicion of Frost's murder. He was expected to be charged but died before police could do so.
December 1965	Ivor Pearce	Stanmore, London	The 30-year-old Edgware man was found dead in his taxi, killed by someone firing a bullet from an automatic pistol into the back of his head. A letter indicating that he might have known the perpetrator was received by the police by the fourth week of January 1966.
December 1965	Alfred Bowler	Attacked in Kegworth, Leicestershire, died at the Leicester Royal Infirmary	74-year-old Bowler ran a shop on Derby Road and died 23 days after being stabbed in the stomach during a struggle to stop a man from taking money out of the till there.
April 1966	Fred Craven	Bingley, West Yorkshire	60-year-old Craven's head was battered at his Wellington Street betting office and £195 was stolen from there on 22 April 1966. A man appearing to be in his 20s was seen near there during the crucial time window and soon regarded as a suspect, but efforts to identify him with certainty have not been successful.
June 1966	Winifred Sharp	Leeds	On 9 June 1966, a thin-faced man with dark hair grabbed about £160 from the counter in a post office in Leeds and fled the premises after firing gunshots that killed 50-year-old Sharp and seriously injured the person in charge. Sharp worked there as a counter assistant.
June 1966	Louis Bega	Eccles, Manchester	43-year-old Bega, a father-of-two, was stabbed 26 times in the living room of his home in Eccles on 23 June 1966. As he lay dying from his wounds, he was heard to name his wife's lover as the culprit, but the police thought he had been killed because he had disturbed someone who was in the property to commit burglary.
November 1966	Helen Davidson	Hodgemoor Wood, Buckinghamshire	49-year-old Davidson, a popular GP who enjoyed birdwatching, was struck across the head with a piece of wood while exercising her dog in woodland a few miles from her home in Amersham on 9 November 1966. Her body was found at the scene the next day, and nobody has been convicted of her murder.
December 1966	Mavis Hudson	Chesterfield, Derbyshire	15-year-old Hudson was last seen on 26 December 1966. The following day her body was found in a derelict building. She had been strangled. In spite of appeals on national TV, no arrests were made, and the case remains unsolved.
January 1967	Bernard Oliver	Tattingstone, Suffolk	Oliver, a 17-year-old from Muswell Hill in London, disappeared on 6 January 1967 and his dismembered body was found in suitcases 10 days later at Tattingstone, near Ipswich. No one has been charged over his murder, but a spokeswoman for Suffolk Constabulary stated in January 2017 that DNA evidence may help to yield some clues 50 years on.
January 1967	Alfred Swinscoe	Sutton-in-Ashfield, Nottinghamshire	54-year-old collier Swinscoe disappeared from the Miners Arms pub in Pinxton, Derbyshire on 27 January 1967; it was thought he abandoned his wife and six children following the couple's separation. Clothing and human remains were unearthed in Sutton-in-Ashfield in April 2023 and the DNA partially matched Swinscoe's grandson, who volunteered a sample after a flashback triggered by an image of his grandfather's odd socks. Swinscoe had blunt-force trauma to his head, ribcage and spine, sharp-force trauma to his jawline, and a broken hand. Police revealed in 2024 that two suspects, one with a history of violence, had both died before Swinscoe's remains were discovered.
May 1967	Keith Lyon	Woodingdean, East Sussex	12-year-old Lyon was found stabbed to death on a bridleway linking the villages of Ovingdean and Woodingdean, near Brighton, on 6 May 1967. Despite arrests over his death as recently as 2006, no one has ever been charged in connection with it.
June 1967	Herbert Wilkinson	Whatcroft, Cheshire	The body of Wilkinson, a 52-year-old former solicitor, was discovered in a shallow grave between the towns of Northwich and Middlewich in October 1967. He had disappeared on 2 June after scribbling a note for his housekeeper, and had been struck off by the Law Society in March. Due to the remoteness of the location alongside the Trent & Mersey Canal, police believed Wilkinson had been taken there by boat. He was thought to have died from strangulation or a blow to the head, and an inquest in March 1968 returned a verdict of murder by a person or persons unknown.
November 1967	Rita Ellis	Halton, Buckinghamshire	19-year-old Ellis was in the Women's Royal Air Force and worked in the catering department of the RAF hospital at RAF Halton. Her body was found partially hidden under leaves and foliage near the camp on 12 November 1967. She had been beaten, sexually assaulted and strangled after being seen on the evening of 11 November. Scientific advances mean that the police now have a DNA profile of Ellis's killer.
January 1968	Kimberley Jackson	Norton, County Durham	Five-month-old Jackson was taken in her pram from outside the back door of her home in Carmel Gardens, Norton, and found drowned in water at nearby Billingham Bottoms an hour-and-a-half later. A teenage boy was seen pushing the pram and it was abandoned in Amble View, a short distance from where Jackson was found.
1968–1969	February 1968: Patricia Docker; August 1969: Jemima McDonald; October 1969: Helen Puttock	Glasgow	Victims of Bible John
February 1968	Mary Judge	Leeds	The naked and battered body of the 42-year-old prostitute was found near Leeds Parish Church on 26 February 1968. It has been speculated but never proven that it was Peter Sutcliffe (dubbed "the Yorkshire Ripper" some years after this slaying) who killed her.
March 1968	David Lawrence	Southwark, London	Five-year-old Lawrence was found murdered in public toilets in a children's playground in Tabard Gardens, Southwark, on 8 March 1968. He lived in Rochester House, a building overlooking the park where the playground was.
August 1968	Adeline Bracegirdle	Macclesfield, Cheshire	A 22-year-old man's conviction for Bracegirdle's murder was quashed in July 1984 (by which time he was 37 or 38) following an appeal. Bracegirdle, an 84-year-old spinster, had been raped and strangled at her home on Buxton Road, Macclesfield.
November 1968	Ernest Bennett	Lewisham, London	58-year-old Bennett was battered to death at his sweet shop on George Lane in Lewisham and left in a disused air-raid shelter behind the building on 21 November 1968. There was also a theft of about £150.
April 1969	Annie Walker	Heather, Leicestershire	Walker, a widow and former pub landlady in her 70s, was fatally bludgeoned at her home in Heather on 2 April 1969. Cash totalling £1,000 was stolen as well. The killing became known as "the Coronation Street murder", due to the victim sharing the same name and occupation as one of the programme's characters. In 2005, by re-examining bloodstains on a piece of clothing from the scene, forensic scientists were hoping to extract DNA samples which would positively identify the murderer.
April 1969	April Fabb	Body not found	13-year-old Fabb left her Metton (Norfolk) residence on 8 April 1969 to cycle to a house about 1.7 miles (2.7 km) away to take a pack of cigarettes as a birthday present for her brother-in-law. She never arrived, and Ordnance Survey workers saw her blue and white bicycle dumped in a field between her home and her sister's at around 2:15 p.m. Fabb has still not been found, but police have always suspected her to be a victim of homicide.
June 1969	Lesley McMurray	Fair Oak, Hampshire	The 21-year-old Southampton University student kissed her boyfriend goodbye and told him she was heading back to her hall of residence on 2 June 1969, but did not arrive at her destination. Her remains were discovered at Fair Oak in March 1970. Over 30 years later, police charged a Rampton Secure Hospital patient with McMurray's murder, but the Crown Prosecution Service made a last-minute decision not to go ahead with a trial, giving insufficient evidence as the reason.
September 1969	Reginald Stevens	Luton, Bedfordshire	56-year-old Stevens, a Luton sub-postmaster, was shot dead in a car park near his workplace during a raid that witness statements indicated four men were involved in. Three men received prison sentences for his murder and the raid, but in 1973, one of them had his conviction set aside. Ongoing concerns about the convictions of the other two meant that in 1980, they too were allowed to walk free; however, the guilty verdicts against them were not formally declared unsafe until a court ruling posthumously exonerated both men in 2003.

== See also ==
- List of unsolved murders in the United Kingdom
- Chris Clark, author and documentary-maker who focuses on unsolved murders
- David Smith, convicted killer suspected of being responsible for unsolved murders
