= Peter Pickering =

English sportsman

Personal information
- Full name: Peter Barlow Pickering
- Date of birth: 24 March 1926
- Place of birth: New Earswick, England
- Date of death: 21 November 2006 (aged 80)
- Place of death: Cape Town, South Africa
- Position: Goalkeeper

Youth career
- New Earswick

Senior career*
Years	Team	Apps	(Gls)
1946–1948	York City	49	(0)
1948–1951	Chelsea	27	(0)
1951–1955	Kettering Town		
1955–1958	Northampton Town	86	(0)
Total		162	(0)
- * Club domestic league appearances and goals

"Peter Pickering" was also the name of the man suspected of the murder of Elsie Frost.

Peter Barlow Pickering (24 March 1926 – 21 November 2006) was an English sportsman who played both football and cricket.

== Career ==
=== Football career ===
Born in New Earswick, Pickering played as a goalkeeper for New Earswick, York City, Chelsea, Kettering Town and Northampton Town, making a total of 162 appearances in the Football League.

=== Cricket career ===
Pickering also played for Northamptonshire. He made a single first-class appearance, during the 1953 season, against Lancashire. From the tailend, Pickering scored 22 runs in the first innings and 37 in the second. Northamptonshire won the match by one wicket.
