= Tabard (disambiguation) =

A tabard is a short coat which was a common item of men's clothing in the Middle Ages, and which has survived to the present day as the distinctive garment of officers of arms.

Tabard may also refer to:

- HMS Tabard (P342), a British submarine
- Tabard, British English for a cobbler apron
- Tabard Gardens, a park in Southwark, London, located on Tabard Street
- Tabard RFC, a rugby union football club based in Radlett, Hertfordshire, UK
- Tabard Street, a street in Southwark, London, named after the former public house
- Tabard Theatre, a former name for the Chiswick Playhouse in London
- The Tabard, a former public house in Southwark, London
- The Tabard, Chiswick, a public house in Chiswick, London
- The Tabard (fraternity), a Dartmouth College Greek organization
