= Murder of Anne Noblett =

Murder case in England

- Location: Marshalls Heath, Hertfordshire, England
- Date: c. 30 December 1957; 68 years ago
- Attack type: Homicide by strangulation
- Victims: Anne Noblett, aged 17
- Perpetrator: Unknown

The murder of Anne Noblett is an unsolved British murder case from 1957. On Monday, 30 December 1957, 17-year-old Anne Noblett disappeared whilst travelling to her home in Marshalls Heath, Hertfordshire. A month later, on 31 January 1958, her fully clothed body was found in woodland near Whitwell. Her remains showed signs of having been refrigerated and the case was dubbed the "Deep Freeze Murder" by the press. Two thousand people were interviewed, and refrigeration units within a 30-mile (48 km) radius were investigated, but no one to date has been arrested for the murder. The cause of death was determined to be strangulation, and police believe she was killed soon after her abduction.

== Disappearance ==
On Monday, 30 December 1957, Anne Noblett, a student at Watford Technical College, had attended a dance with friends at Lourdes Hall in Harpenden in Hertfordshire. After the dance she said goodbye to friends and caught the 391 Green Line bus to return home to Marshalls Heath near Wheathampstead, where she lived with her parents (Thomas and Ira) and brothers. The last sighting of Noblett was by Shirley Edwards at around six o'clock in the evening when she alighted the bus at the Cherry Trees pub at the bottom of Marshalls Heath Lane, close to home.

There was a report, by a local resident, of car rear lights being visible further up the lane at the approximate time of her disappearance.

Her parents reported their daughter as missing and police undertook a search with dogs in the area but found nothing.

== Discovery of body ==
Noblett's body was found on 31 January 1958 by two brothers, Hugh and Brian Symonds, out walking their dog in Rose Grove Woods (known locally as Young's Wood) near Horn Hill, Whitwell; approximately seven miles from where she was last seen. Police attended the scene, in scrub 300 yards from the main road, and Noblett's body was found fully clothed and with her spectacles on; her belongings were found close by. It was determined that she had been strangled and most likely suffered a sexual assault. Her body was also found to be frozen solid.

== Investigation ==
The crime was investigated by Detective Chief Superintendent Robert Elwell of Hertfordshire CID, who was assisted by Detective Superintendent Richard Lewis of New Scotland Yard's Murder Squad. It was determined that Anne had probably been picked up between the bus stop and her home, possibly by someone she knew. The freezing of Noblett's body could not have been a natural occurrence as the temperature in the period between her disappearance and discovery had been quite mild. Officers now considered that Noblett's body had been refrigerated and the press dubbed the killing the "Deep Freeze Murder".

Though Noblett's body had been found fully clothed it was found that she had been stripped and redressed. Buttons on her undergarments had been attached incorrectly.

It was determined during Noblett's autopsy that she had died soon after being abducted, as the food she had eaten that day had not been digested. Dr Francis Camps, the Home Office pathologist who carried out the post mortem, determined Noblett's body had probably been put in a refrigeration unit before being transported to the wood where she was found.

Police decided that Noblett had been murdered soon after being abducted, and that her body had then been placed in a refrigeration unit. The murderer then transported the frozen body and carried it (there were no signs of dragging) from a vehicle to the wood where it was later found. They determined that the murderer would have been strong to have carried the 11-stone frozen body to where it was placed, and also that the difference in the growth of plants under and beside Noblett's body meant that she was probably placed there up to a fortnight before being discovered.

An extensive police search of all refrigeration units within a 30-mile radius of the crime scene yielded nothing. Local farmland, outbuildings and factories were also searched.

The motive for the murder appeared to be of a sexual nature.

== Case reviews ==
Several case reviews have taken place over the decades following the murder; the last in February 2017. Police admit the murderer may well have died in the intervening years. The possibility of discovering the identity of the murder is low due to a lack of DNA evidence in the case, as no physical evidence remains.

== See also ==
- Child abduction
- Child Abuse
- Child Sexual Abuse
- List of solved missing person cases
- List of unsolved murders in the United Kingdom

== Cited works and further reading ==
- Lane, Brian (1991). The Murder Guide to Great Britain. London: Robinson Publishing Ltd. ISBN 978-1-854-87083-4.
