= Murder of the Ormesher Sisters =

Unsolved 1956 double murder in Lancashire, England

Coordinates: 53.572012963541475°N 2.897808865545528°W

Margaret Ormesher
- Born: Margaret Jane Ormesher; 1888; Ormskirk, Lancashire, England
- Died: 5 May 1956 (aged 67–68); Ormskirk, Lancashire, England
- Cause of death: Blunt force trauma
- Body discovered: 6 May 1956
- Known for: Victim of unsolved murder

Mary Ormesher
- Born: 1889; Ormskirk, Lancashire, England
- Died: 5 May 1956 (aged 66–67); Ormskirk, Lancashire, England
- Cause of death: Blunt force trauma
- Body discovered: 6 May 1956
- Known for: Victim of unsolved murder

Locations
1 Ivy Dene, Asmall Lane, Ormskirk.

The murder of the Ormesher Sisters took place in Ormskirk, Lancashire, England in 1956. Despite national media coverage and an extensive investigation, in which all of the adult male population of the town were fingerprinted, the identity of the murderer or murderers has never been established. The investigation remains open and, as of March 2015, the case remains one of fifteen unsolved murders being investigated by Lancashire Police.

== Background ==
Sisters Margaret Jane Ormesher (68) and Mary Ormesher (67) had lived in Ormskirk all their lives. Margaret and Mary were born to Edward and Emma Ormesher and had two other sisters called Ellen and May.

Margaret and Mary were unmarried and were both diminutive in stature at less than five feet tall. The sisters were described as ‘harmless’ and ‘helpful’ and were well known in the market town. They ran a tobacconists and sweetshop on Church Street, one of the main streets of the town. Mary was known as ‘Auntie Polly’ to friends and customers.

=== Residence ===
At the time of the murders, the sisters resided at Ivy Dene (sometimes styled Ivydene), 8 Asmall Lane, Ormskirk which was formerly the Brick Makers Arms. The sisters' father, Edward Ormesher, had once run the John Bull public house on Chapel Street, Ormskirk which was described as the worst in the town before losing its licence. Edward Ormesher and his wife then became licensees at The Brickmakers Arms pub on Asmall Lane, Ormskirk and when that pub also lost its licence it was closed and the building was converted to a dwelling within which the Ormesher family continued to live.

The property was a ten-room house with a rear yard and a separate, communal courtyard behind. The courtyard, known as the Brickmakers Arms Yard, was accessed via a passage between nos. 6 and 8 Asmall Lane and contained several small dwellings. The Brickmakers Arms Yard was overlooked by cottages no. 1 and 2 on one side and nos. 3 to 7 along the back.

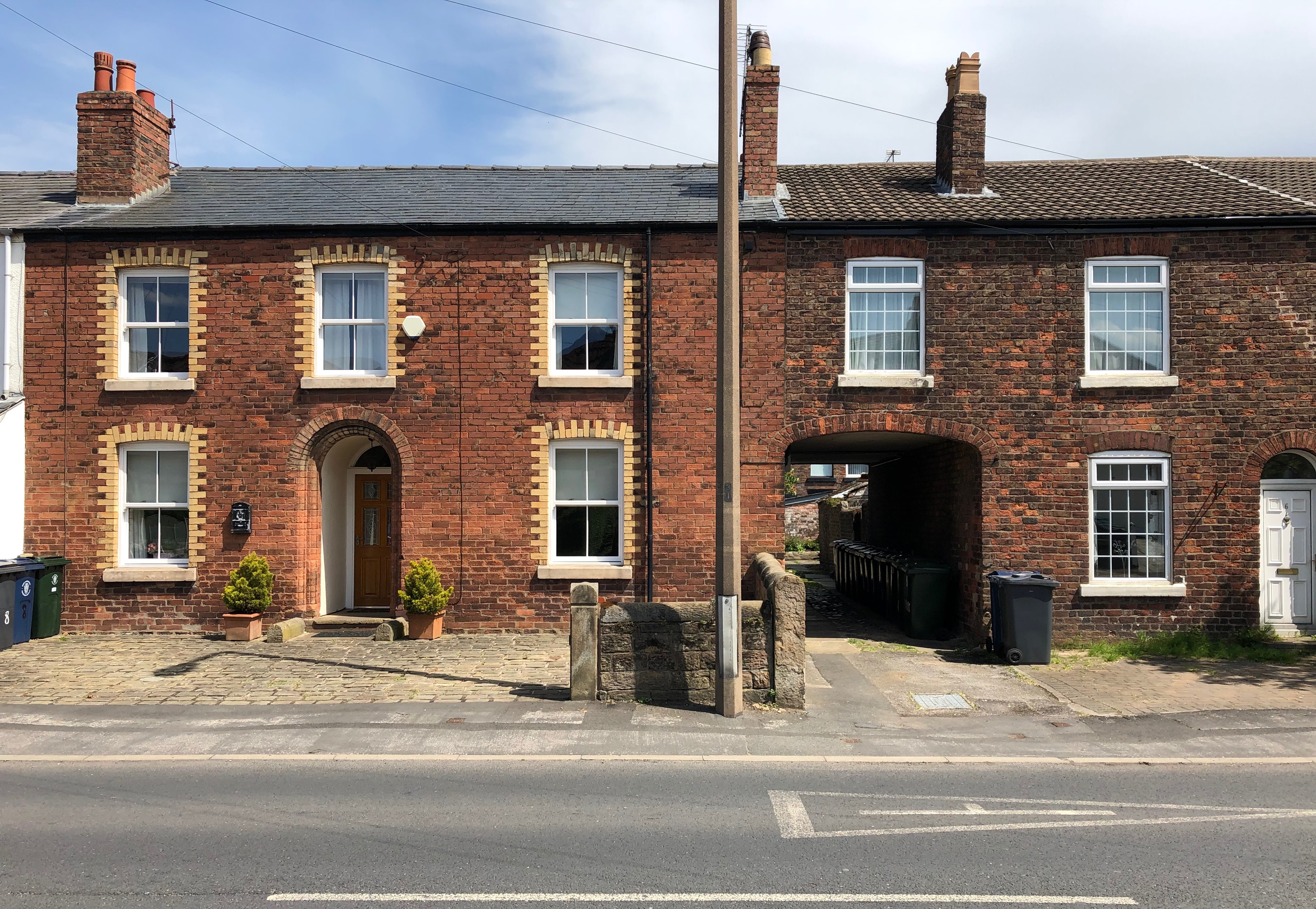
Photograph taken in 2019 of Ivy Dene. Ivy Dene is to the left of the photograph and the archway through to The Brickmakers Arms can be seen to the right.

=== Security routine ===
Mary Ormesher had been advised, almost six years prior to her murder, to put her money in a bank or have someone accompany her on the walk home. Mrs Josephine Mary Whitehouse had lived above the sisters’ shop on Church Street with her husband, John Frederick Whitehouse, for six years. Mrs Whitehouse had accompanied Mary home every night, without incident, for almost six years. Whitehouse always walked Mary up to the front door (which was bolted from the inside) and it was then opened by Margaret as Mary did not have a front door key.

The sisters always kept the back door of Ivy Dene locked; however, Mary had told Josephine Whitehouse that Margaret had a bad habit of opening the back door if she heard a sound. The sisters sometimes went to bed as late as 1 am.

== Day of the murder ==
On the evening of Saturday, 5 May 1956, Mary walked the 0.7 miles (1.1 km), (approx. 15 min) journey home from the shop alone. She had with her a brown attaché case, which was used to carry the shop takings and contained the whole week's takings of £150. This was the first night in almost six years that Mary had walked home alone; on the same day, the Whitehouses went to Southport and found the shop closed and padlocked upon their return.

Mr John Wright, labourer, of 27 Asmall Lane told the inquiry that at 6:45pm he was in the living room of his home and saw Margaret Ormesher entering the garden gate at Ivy Dene. She was wearing a dark grey coat and black hat but he did not notice whether she was carrying anything. About five minutes later he heard a motor car horn and saw a trader with whom he knew Margaret did business. He did not notice anything or anyone else that night and he drew curtains at 9:15pm.

Elderly Mrs Mary Jane Sephton of 56 Halsall Lane (which connects to Asmall Lane) witnessed Mary Ormesher pass by from her bedroom window between 10:10 and 10:25pm. Mary was on her own and carrying the attache case in her right hand.

Mary arrived home between 10:10pm and 10:25pm. Sunset was 8:49pm and her walk home was dimly lit by gas street lamps. She was witnessed by a neighbour carrying the brown attaché case in her right hand and an unidentified object in her left hand. There were no reports of her being followed home.

At 10.18pm, another neighbour was returning to his house in Brickmakers Arms Yard and saw an unidentified male across the road from the Yard. Sometime later, another neighbour left his house via the front door to go across the road to run an errand, returning at 11.20pm. He did not report seeing or hearing anyone or anything.

At around 11.15pm and 11.30pm, according to the findings of the inquiry, several neighbours stated that they heard a variety of noises, which included groans, male and female voices, breaking glass and bin lids clattering, all emanating from the sisters' home. Neighbours at nos. 2 and 3 Brickmakers Arms Yard heard these noises but dismissed them at the time as not of a serious nature and went back to bed.

== Discovery ==
At 10:30am on Sunday 6 May 1956, Mrs Whitehouse took a cup of tea to the shop for Mary and found it locked. An hour later, she became concerned and walked to Ivy Dene and knocked on the front door. At around 11:50, Whitehouse sought the help of a Thomas Patrick Cummins who was standing outside his house, 6 Asmall Lane, and they walked round to the back of Ivy Dene. They went into the yard and when Whitehouse saw blood she screamed. Mr Cummins pushed open the back door of the dwelling, looked inside, and told Whitehouse, ‘You go back’. Cummins entered the house and after two or three minutes he emerged and declared ‘They're past aid. It's a police case.’

The sisters’ battered and bloody bodies lay in the kitchen wearing their usual attire, which included cardigans and jumpers. There was evidence that a violent struggle had taken place with serious injuries to the sisters’ heads and upper bodies. The murder weapons were a large brass kitchen poker with the head removed, two brass candlesticks and a wine bottle. The poker had been bent and the bases of the candlesticks broken with the force of the attack. Witnesses had seen similar pokers and candlesticks in the sisters’ house, indicating that they originated there.

The attaché case was found open on the kitchen table. Only one of the two cash bags was taken. The remaining one contained £50 in silver meaning that around £100 was missing (worth around £2,300 in 2017). The only clue left by the murderer at the scene was a bloodied fingerprint, for which a match was never found.

== Initial investigation ==
Police went from house to house in pairs, eventually covering the whole town, questioning residents on whether they had seen Mary walking home, whether anyone was following her, or whether any strangers had been seen that night. The police took fingerprints of every male aged over 18 in Ormskirk without finding a match to the fingerprint left at the murder scene.

Police assumed that the killer knocked at the back door and did not enter the house, as several hundred pounds was stored, piled up in boxes, within. Police believed that it was an open secret that the sisters took their takings home with them. Police had been aware of a plot to rob the sisters 18 months before the murder but had simply advised them to be careful.

Local rumours were that the sisters kept a fortune in a grandfather clock in the kitchen; however, police searched the house and found only a small amount of silver. There was no evidence that the house had been ransacked. Police refuted claims that the sisters were moneylenders, stating that they had simply made a small number of loans to business-owning friends in the past. Rumours circulated in the town of a district nurse in the neighbouring village of Halsall attending to a heavily bloodied man on the night of the murders.

The sisters had provided accommodation to evacuees from the Liverpool Blitz during World War II and police made a check on the names of people who stayed with them or on Asmall Lane. A week after the murder the police made inquiries at the pubs and dancehalls frequented by Teddy Boys who visited the town from Liverpool.

The murder became national news and the Ormskirk Advertiser put up a £50 reward for information.

=== Inquiry ===
The autopsy was performed by Dr George B. Manning of the Home Office Forensic Science Laboratory, Preston. Manning stated that the sisters’ deaths had occurred at around midnight, had been very violent, and that they had been killed with a great deal of force.

James B. Houghton (11) of 37 Asmall Lane (located opposite the junction between Whiterails Drive and Asmall Lane) told the inquiry that he had seen an unidentified individual acting suspiciously on three consecutive nights. The first sighting was at 10:10pm on Wednesday 2 May 1956. The unidentified individual was leaning on a bicycle against a hedge at the corner of Asmall Lane and Whiterails Drive and was looking down Asmall Lane in the direction of the junction with Halsall Lane (the direction from which Mary would come on the night of 5 May). The boy stated that he believed he had seen the same person doing the same activity on the following two nights, Thursday 3 May and Friday 4 May. The individual, who was believed to be male, was described as being 5ft tall, of medium build with a longish face and high cheekbones. Their face was clean shaven and they had long, dark hair hanging over their forehead. The person was wearing a light-coloured double breasted mackintosh fastened with a belt and grey trousers. The bicycle, which looked fairly new, was a light-blue racing bike with drop handlebars and white mudguards.

No arrests were ever made in connection with the murder.

== Subsequent investigations ==
One weekend in February 1983, an unidentified individual made a telephone call to a Manchester newspaper and made a claim to know the identity of the murderer. It is believed the call came from a man aged in his 70s who regretted withholding vital facts for many years. The newspaper passed the information to Lancashire CID. The identified murder suspect was investigated but this did not lead to a conviction and police did not provide any further information.

== See also ==
- Unsolved murders in the United Kingdom
