= Murder of Margery Wren =

English murder victim

Margery Wren
- Born: 1850; Broadstairs, Kent, England
- Died: 25 September 1930 (aged 79–80); Ramsgate, Kent, England
- Cause of death: Complications from blunt force trauma

Margery Wren (1850 – 25 September 1930) was a sweetshop owner and former maid who was murdered at her premises in Ramsgate in 1930.

== Life ==
Margery was born in 1850 at 3 Charlotte Street, Broadstairs. Her parents were William Wren, a house painter, and his wife Elizabeth. She had at least one sibling, a sister named Mary Jane, who was born in 1845.

Margery worked as a servant in London and was living in Islington in 1871, but by 1881 was living with her parents at 42 Spencer Street, Clerkenwell, and still working as a maidservant. She continued in this profession until the 1890s, when a relative named Mrs Wroughton, died and bequeathed her sweetshop at 2 Church Road, Ramsgate, to Margery and Mary Jane. The sisters moved there and ran the shop, living on the premises.

Mary Jane died on 31 January 1927, leaving Margery £921 12s 7d and her share of the shop. Neither sister had married.

=== Day of attack ===
Albert Williams, a 69-year-old man from Dover, visited her about 1pm to complain to her about his nephew, who was leaving to find lodgings elsewhere. Children from the local school bought sweets from the shop at lunchtime and coal was delivered by Reuben Beer about half an hour afterwards. A woman with a red hat visited the shop shortly before the murder.

Wren was attacked around 5:30pm. Shortly after 6pm, Ellen Marvell arrived to buy blancmange powder for her mother and, having found the shop closed, began knocking on the door. Margery came to the door, unkempt and bleeding badly from a head wound. Ellen asked her for some blancmange powder and Margery let her select it. Ellen told her father what happened when she got home and he went to the shop. When he arrived, he found Margery had passed out, and sent his daughters for a doctor and police.

On regaining consciousness, Margery told Mr Marvell that she had fallen and hit her head, but Richard Archibald, her doctor, saw she bore signs of multiple blows of a blunt instrument. She told him that she had been assaulted by a man with the fire tongs, which bore bloodstains. The doctor was puzzled that she did not want the name of her assailant to be known.

=== Hospital ===
She was taken to Ramsgate hospital where she survived for another five days. She was confused and gave further accounts of what happened to her with inconsistent details such as the name and number of attackers.

When the magistrate came to take her statement she said "I do not wish him to suffer. He must bear his sins. I do not wish to make a statement". The local vicar could not persuade her to name her attacker.

The Chief Constable of Ramsgate contacted Scotland Yard, who sent Chief Inspector Walter Hambrook to take over the investigation. He arrived on 24 September, but Margery had slipped into a coma.

=== Death ===
She died of her wounds on 25 September.

== Investigation ==
Hambrook inspected the shop, finding it had little stock, as well as being verminous and dirty.

The victim had told some people she owned valuable property in London, but told others she was quite poor and was known to have meals at a soup kitchen.

Two cousins, Hannah Cook and Ann Wilson, were beneficiaries of her will, though neither could have physically carried out the attack; Cook was 72, and Wilson was 84 and an invalid. Hannah's son Arthur Cook was investigated, but he was a police constable with a perfect record and there was no evidence of blood on his clothes.

John Lambert, a prisoner, confessed to the murder, but when Hambrook questioned him, he made many untrue statements and could not describe the landscape of Ramsgate.

Albert Williams was one of those named by Margery in her inconsistent ramblings, but nothing emerged to link him to the murder. She had also named "Hamelyn of number 19", which matched the name of Arthur Hamelyn, a butcher's assistant of 19 Church Road. He had once nearly accidentally knocked her down with his motorbike, but he had an alibi for the murder.

Hambrook thought she knew her attacker, but for some unknown reason kept it to herself.

She also said "Hope did it! Hope was the one that did it!", leading police to investigate everyone with that surname in Ramsgate. A man of that name in Dene Road was found, but he was aged 84 and his sons were in Tunbridge Wells at the time of the murder.

Of six people she named, three had solid alibis. Hambrook thought one of the other three was her killer.

=== Possible suspect ===
The police file on the murder indicates that their main suspect was one Charles Ernest Hope (1 October 1910 - January 1983) of 88 Church Road. The police file refers to him as "Ernest Charles Hope". He was a former private with the Royal Corps of Signals who was discharged for larceny. He spent time in Borstal. On 27 August he was arrested in London for stealing jewellery worth £10 from a luggage compartment of a train. On 18 and 19 September he stayed in the Salvation Army hostel in Euston Road, then took a train from London Victoria station to Ramsgate railway station the following day. He arrived at 4pm and by 4:20pm was at his parents house in Church Road.

He claimed that bloodstains on his clothes and kit bag were from cutting himself during the train robbery, but this was contradicted by the police inspector who arrested him. He lied about his movements on 20 September, claiming he got off the train at Dumpton Park railway station. He was never named as a suspect or charged with the murder.

He married Mary Rosamund, abandoned his life of petty crime and became a foreman carpenter. He moved to Langley. He died from a burst duodenal ulcer.

=== Inquest ===
The inquest was opened by Dr. F. W. Hardman on 26 September and went on to 24 October. Bernard Spilsbury and Dr. Gerard Roche Lynch testified that Margery had been held very firmly by the throat in an attempt at strangulation, then beaten repeatedly with the tongs. A policewoman testified at length about Margery's confused comments on her deathbed. The woman in a red hat was never identified, despite a police appeal. The inquest returned a verdict of murder against a person or persons unknown. Nobody was ever charged with her murder.

== Today ==
The former shop has been converted into a private residence.

== See also ==
- List of unsolved murders in the United Kingdom
