= Murder of Linda Smith =

1961 child murder in Essex, England

Linda Smith
- Born: Linda Ann Smith; Earls Colne, Essex, England
- Disappeared: 16 January 1961
- Body discovered: 21 January 1961
- Occupation: Student
- Known for: going missing and being found dead after being murdered
- Parents: Robert Smith (father); Patricia Smith (mother)

Linda Ann Smith was a 12-year-old girl from Earls Colne, Essex, England who disappeared on 16 January 1961 while making a short trip to a local newsagent. Her body was discovered four days later in a field near Polstead, Suffolk. She had been strangled with her own school scarf. Her murder remains unsolved as of 2026.

== Disappearance ==
On 16 January 1961, Smith left her great-aunt's house in Earls Colne to visit a local newsagent. The journey normally took approximately 15 minutes. She was seen walking along Burrows Road toward the newsagent and was subsequently seen looking through the shop's window without entering.

Smith then crossed the road and spoke with the local cobbler. One eyewitness statement indicates she may have entered the passenger seat of an unknown car.

== Discovery of the body ==
Four days after Smith disappeared, on 20 January 1961, her body was found by a retired farmworker in a field in Polstead, Suffolk, approximately 18.5 miles from Earls Colne. She had been strangled with her school scarf.

The discovery led to a major police investigation. The Metropolitan Police assisted with inquiries, and numerous people were interviewed in connection with the case.

== Investigation and aftermath ==
Police investigated numerous leads and questioned people in both Earls Colne and the surrounding area. Contemporary newspaper reports also documented the subsequent inquest and the continuing investigation.

In June 1961, Smith's family solicitor sought a warrant for the arrest of a man in connection with her murder, but the application did not result in an arrest. Contemporary reports also recorded evidence given by police officers and other witnesses during the inquest.

No person was ever arrested or charged with Smith's murder. Suffolk Police continues to classify the case as an unsolved murder and has periodically reviewed the available evidence.

== See also ==
- List of unsolved murders in the United Kingdom (before 1970)
- List of solved missing person cases (1950–1969)
