= Murder of Muriel Drinkwater =

Unsolved 1946 Welsh child murder case

Muriel Drinkwater
- Born: Muriel Joan Drinkwater; 19 July 1933; Carmarthen, Carmarthenshire, Wales
- Died: 27 June 1946 (aged 12); Penllergaer, Swansea, Wales
- Cause of death: gunshot and head injury
- Body discovered: 28 June 1946
- Parent(s): Percival and Margaret Drinkwater

The murder of Muriel Drinkwater (Welsh: Llofruddiaeth Muriel Drinkwater), also known as the Little Red Riding Hood murder, is an unsolved 1946 child murder case from Wales. Drinkwater, a 12-year-old schoolgirl, was raped and shot in the woods in Penllergaer, Swansea. It is one of the oldest active cold cases in the United Kingdom. In 2008, a DNA profile of the suspect was extracted from Drinkwater's clothes, possibly the oldest sample in the world to be successfully extracted in a murder investigation. In 2019, the DNA was used to rule out notorious Welsh murderer Harold Jones as a suspect.

The police found one of the case's murder weapons, a World War I-era Colt .45 pistol. Policemen from Glamorgan, assisted by the 169th Bomb Disposal Unit, used a metal detector to search for a second weapon suspected to have been used, but never located it.

== Murder and investigation ==
Muriel Joan Drinkwater was the youngest of four daughters born to John Percival and Margaret (née Morgans) Drinkwater. On 27 June 1946, Muriel took the school bus home from Gowerton Grammar School. She was last seen at 2:30 p.m., singing as she began the one-mile walk to her family's home, Tyle-Du Farm. The path she walked home on curved in and out of the woods; her mother saw her walking home along the path and into the woods, but not come out again. The last person who reported seeing her was Hubert Hoyles, then 13, who passed her on the path returning from her family farm, where he had gone to buy eggs. Her mother later went to the village to look for her when she did not return home; more than a dozen men from the area began a search.

The next day, Drinkwater's body was found in the woods by a police inspector. She had been raped, bludgeoned about the head and shot twice in the chest. Two days later, police found one of the murder weapons, a World War I-era Colt .45 pistol. Policemen from Glamorgan, assisted by the 169th Bomb Disposal Unit, used a metal detector to search for a second weapon suspected to have been used, but never located it. Detectives from Scotland Yard came to Swansea to assist in the investigation.

Police visited every house within 150 square miles and interviewed 20,000 men in Swansea and in neighbouring Aberdare and Carmarthenshire. A description of a person of interest was circulated; he was described as approximately 30 years old, with "thick fluffy hair and wearing brown corduroy trousers and a light brown sports jacket." Police also circulated photos of the United States Army-issued gun; notably, perspex had been used to modernise the original wooden stocks next to the grip. It was believed a similar weapon had been used in the murder of a cinema manager in Bristol. In August, the police appealed to the U.S. public for assistance, as many Americans had been stationed in Penllergaer during the recent Second World War and there was a possibility one of the servicemen had sold the weapon.

More than 3,000 mourners attended Drinkwater's funeral on 2 July. She was buried at St David's Church in Penllergaer.

== DNA discovery ==
In 2003, detectives re-opened the case in the hope of finding DNA evidence on the gun, but were not successful as too many people had handled the weapon. It was believed the victim's clothes had been lost. However, in 2008, a team of retired detectives investigating cold cases found Drinkwater's clothes in storage. Her blue coat, underwear and school uniform had been wrapped in a paper bag and stored. On the back of the coat, a no-longer-visible semen stain was circled with yellow crayon. Scientists successfully retrieved a DNA profile from this stain. A familial DNA profile was extracted using a technique called Y-STR, but no match was found in the national DNA database. Hubert Hoyles, who saw Drinkwater after buying eggs at her parents' farm, was cleared by the DNA evidence after living under a "cloud of suspicion" for decades.

== Harold Jones and Ronnie Harries ==
In 2009, Welsh police began reinvestigating any link with the murder of 11-year-old Sheila Martin, who was raped and strangled 250 miles away in Sun Hill Wood, Fawkham Green, Kent, on 7 July 1946, ten days after Drinkwater's murder. Both girls were murdered in woods within a half mile of their homes. South Wales Police detectives requested the original case file from Kent Police to determine if there was a connection.

For more than a decade, Welsh true crime author Neil Milkins theorised that notorious child murderer Harold Jones (1906–1971) was responsible for the murders of both Martin and Drinkwater. However, in 2019, South Wales Police stated that forensic tests on the DNA "categorically confirm that Jones was not responsible for the murder of Muriel Drinkwater."

In 2020, the BBC One documentary Dark Land: Hunting the Killers suggested that Ronnie Harries could be the murderer. Harries was hanged in 1954 for the double murder of John and Phoebe Harries. There is evidence that Harries was employed by Drinkwater's father, John, at the time of her death.

== Public access ==
In 2010, the Lord Chancellor's Advisory Council on National Records and Archives closed off public access to the case, acting at the behest of Scotland Yard. The public can no longer access the Drinkwater files by Freedom of Information Act requests or in person at the archives office in Kew. The reason given for sealing the files was that it could help the police catch the perpetrator.

== See also ==
- List of solved missing person cases: pre–1950
- List of unsolved murders in the United Kingdom (before 1970)
- Murder of Lynette White, 1988 murder of Welsh girl solved by DNA in 2002
