= Evelyn Foster =

Northumbrian murder victim

Evelyn Foster (1902 – 6 January 1931) was an English taxi driver who was murdered in unexplained circumstances in Northumberland.

== Murder ==
Evelyn Foster was the daughter of a garage proprietor in Otterburn, Northumberland. She worked as a self-employed taxi-driver. A former teacher and a member of a choir, she was popular in her community.

Foster was found with serious burns on moorland outside Otterburn on 6 January 1931. She died a few hours after sustaining her injuries. Before she died she described how she had picked up an unknown male passenger at Elishaw, who had asked to be taken to Ponteland. She described how he had knocked her unconscious, thrown a rug over her, and set her on fire. Foster described her attacker as a Tyneside man, about 5 ft 6in tall and around 25 or 26 years old. He was clean-shaven and wore a dark tweed suit, a bowler hat and an overcoat.

== Investigation ==
Police confirmed that they were treating the investigation as a murder case, and that they were searching for a probable "sex-maniac".

A man's scarf and glove were discovered at the scene.

The father of Evelyn Foster wrote a letter to the Home Secretary which severely criticised the police investigation. He argued that the car was left unprotected for hours, so that valid fingerprint samples could not be taken, and that police did not check footprints around the scene of the incident.

The investigation is still an open case for Northumbria Police.

== Aftermath ==
The family were devastated by the loss of Evelyn. Her sister later said, "We were just young then, but that night made us old. We've turned it over and over in our minds ever since. We were such a close family. The hurt was terrible."

== Theories and investigations ==
Julian Symons posited that Foster asked innocent questions of her taxi fare that were misinterpreted and resulted in her death.

Author Robert Dixon examined Evelyn Foster's death in his 2011 book Evelyn Foster: Murder Or Fraud On The Northumberland Moors.

Author Diane Janes was allowed full access to the Northumbria Police archives for the case in 2017. In her book Death at Wolf's Nick: The Killing of Evelyn Foster she names a possible suspect.
