= Thomas Weldon Atherstone =

British actor (1862–1910)

Atherstone and the murder scene - The Ross-Shire Journal (1910)

Thomas Weldon Anderson (1862 – 16 July 1910), known professionally as Thomas Weldon Atherstone, was an English music hall star and victim of an unsolved murder. His body was found in a backyard, at the base of a staircase leading up to the flat of his former lover, at Clifton Gardens, 17 Prince of Wales's Road, Battersea - now Prince of Wales Drive - on 16 July 1910. In 1888, he married the Irish actress Monica Kelly in Salford.

== Career ==
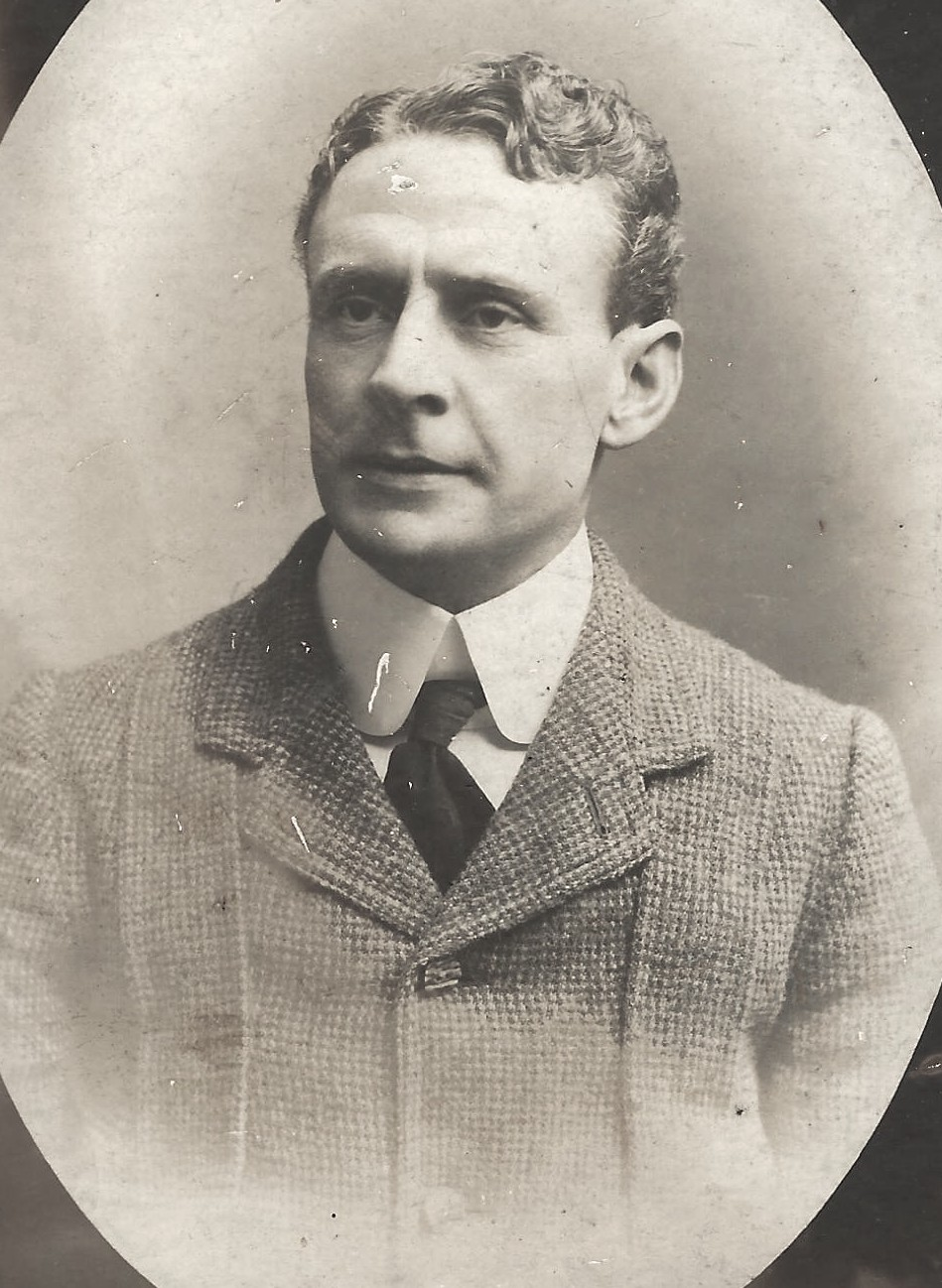
Thomas Weldon Atherstone From the estate of Thomas Federick Anderson (son) 1889-1964 Auckland, New Zealand.

Atherstone was born Thomas Weldon Anderson in Liverpool in late 1861 or early 1862. He was a classically trained actor who became prominent in music halls during the early 1880s and 1890s, although by the turn of the century his presence in vaudeville had been considerably reduced with the exception of occasional performances, such as poetry readings. Atherstone separated from his wife around the turn of the century; she resumed her career in Dublin after their separation. He then began a relationship with American actress Elizabeth 'Bessie' Earle at a flat in London's Battersea around 1899.

While Atherstone's career continued declining over the next decade, Earle retired from the music hall and turned to teaching. From 1907, he and Earle had regular quarrels based on his jealousy - he accused Earle of seeing another man, and resented her success as a drama teacher.

== Murder ==
Earle remained on friendly terms with Atherstone's elder son, Thomas Frederick Anderson, and when visiting her on the evening of 16 July 1910 for supper, they said they heard gunshots from the yard downstairs. Thomas investigated and saw the body of a man who had been shot to death. After calling for the police, it was discovered to be the body of Atherstone, who had been shot twice - once in the lip, and once through his left temple.

Although an investigation found several witnesses who claimed to have seen a man jumping over a back wall fleeing the scene, police believed Atherstone had been spying on the two when he encountered a burglar who shot him and fled the scene. However, the murder remains unsolved.
