= Death of Keith Lyon =

1967 murder in England

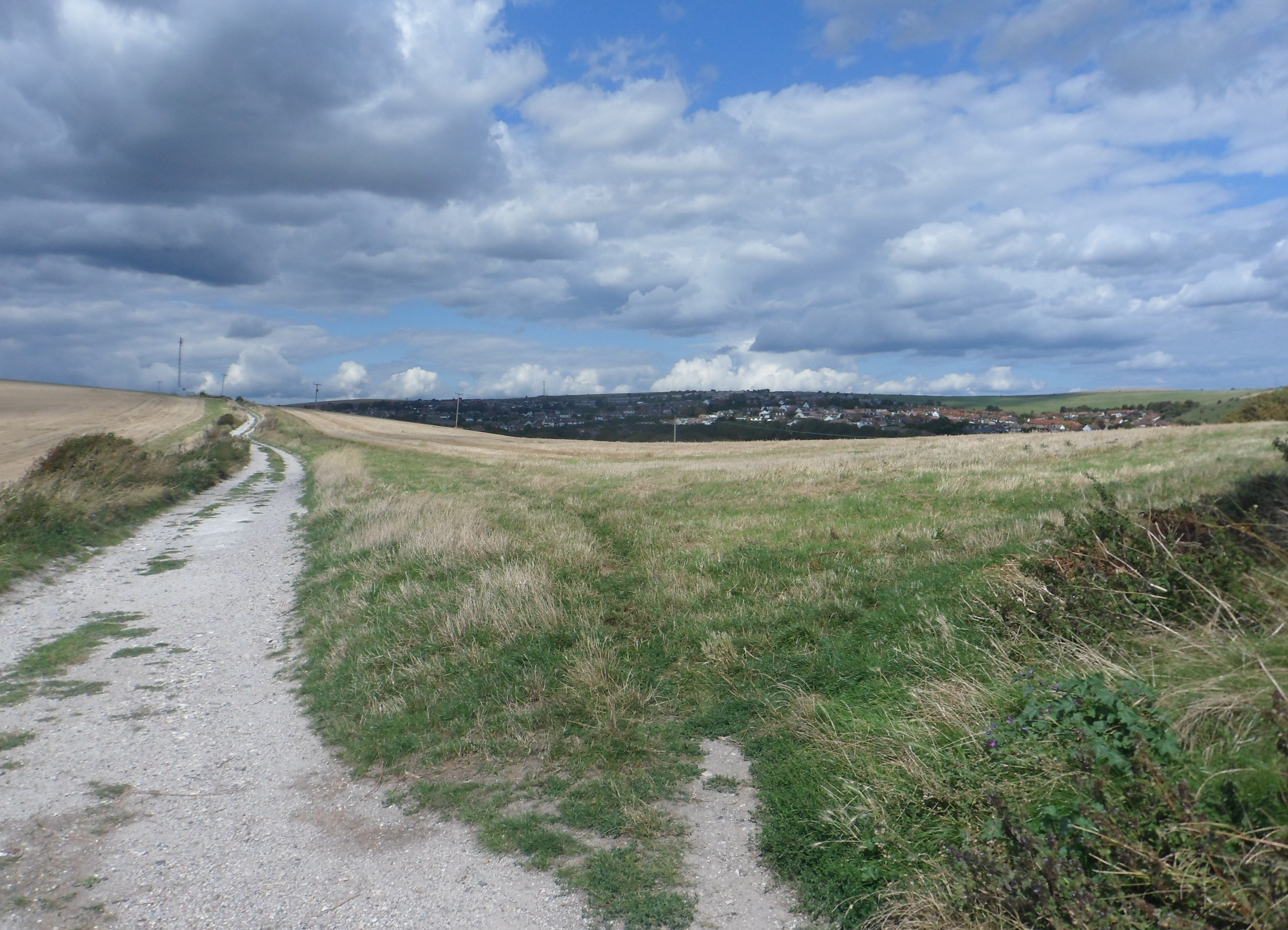
Happy Valley and Woodingdean seen from Ovingdean Road, Ovingdean

Keith Lyon was a British schoolboy who was murdered in 1967 while walking alone on the South Downs. The murderer has never been identified and no charges have ever been made. The murder investigation that took place following the murder has been described as one of the biggest to have ever taken place in Sussex.

== Background ==
Keith Lyon was 12 years old when he was murdered. Lyon attended Brighton, Hove and Sussex Grammar School and was a gifted classical musician. His parents were Valda and Ken Lyon, the latter of whom was a band leader in Brighton. He had a younger brother, named Peter, who was 7 at the time of the murder. The family lived in the village of Ovingdean.

== Day of the murder ==
On Saturday 6 May 1967 Lyon left his house after 2 pm to walk to Woodingdean on his own to buy a geometry set. Lyon was walking along a bridleway that links the villages of Ovingdean and Woodingdean, in an area called Happy Valley near Brighton. Keith was wearing his school uniform even though it was a Saturday. At approximately 3 pm (about 45 minutes after leaving his home) Lyon was attacked and stabbed to death.

At 4:15pm a 16 year old girl discovered the body while walking her dog. The body was found in a location that overlooks the English Channel and is above the private girls school Roedean. The body was discovered under some bushes on a grassy bank and it appeared to have been thrown from the bridleway down the hill. The girl ran back to Woodingdean to fetch the police who arrived quickly and cordoned off the area.

Lyon had been stabbed 11 times in his front and back. Lyon’s pockets had been turned out and his 4 shilling pocket money and keys were missing. Later that day Ken Lyon was preparing to perform at the Metropole Hotel in Brighton when he was notified of the death of his son.

== Subsequent events ==
A few days after the murder a steak knife with a white handle was found in the grounds of a school around a mile away. Evidence was also discovered that someone had cleaned blood off themselves at a nearby public toilet. The blood was found to be Lyon’s. Two female witnesses reported seeing four boys fighting near some bushes on the bridleway on the afternoon of the murder at a time prior to the discovery. A bus driver reported that on the day of the murder he noticed that two youths on his bus, that was travelling to Whitehawk, were in a visibly agitated state.

The murder investigation that took place following the murder has been described as one of the biggest to have ever taken place in Sussex. 75,000 house-to-house inquiries were made and 2000 school children were interviewed. The police took the fingerprints of over 5000 teenagers in the area. Despite there being a number of suspects no charges were ever made.

In 2002 the murder weapon and other items associated with the case were rediscovered in the basement of the Brighton police station. The other items included a cigarette butt, clothes and a blood stained tissue. Following this rediscovery, two men were arrested. However, they were released on bail and after four months the police confirmed that they were no longer suspects.

In 2006 it was announced that police were looking for a family that emigrated to Canada with their teenage son shortly after the murder.
