= Playfinder =

Online sports facility booking marketplace

- Website type: Private
- Founded: 2014; 12 years ago
- Headquarters: London, {{{location_country}}}
- Key people: CEO Jamie Foale; CFO Sandford Loudon
- Industry: Sport
- Website: playfinder.com

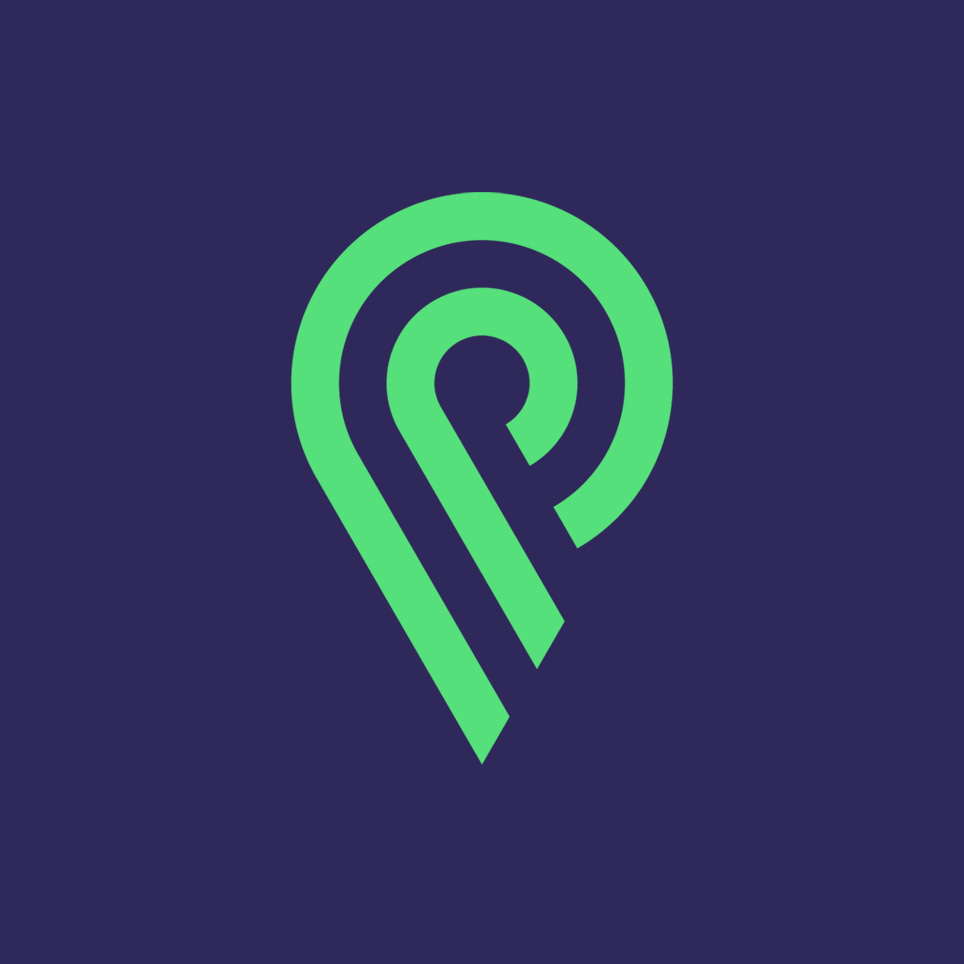

Playfinder, formerly MyLocalPitch, is an online marketplace that allows people to book grassroots sports facilities. The company is headquartered in the United Kingdom with offices in Fitzrovia, London. The service is free to users and is currently available in London, Manchester, Brighton, Liverpool, Newcastle and Glasgow and Dublin.

== History ==
MyLocalPitch was founded in January 2014 by Jamie Foale and Sandford Loudon after struggling to find and book sports pitches for their 11-a-side football team. The site started by listing London based sports venues before expanding into Dublin in March 2015.

In November 2015, the MyLocalPitch iPhone App was released to market, allowing users to book and search for venues using geolocation.

MyLocalPitch initiated its 'Outstanding London Sports Venue Award' in 2015 to recognise outstanding sports facilities for services provided and their role in the community. March's award was claimed by Westway Sport and Fitness and April's went to Playfootball Romford.

As an extension of Sport England's new strategy to increase sports participation, MyLocalPitch has introduced bespoke borough pages to further speed up the booking process. A few examples can be seen for Islington, Hackney and St Albans.

In April 2017 MyLocalPitch launched its second iOS app with new features including an interactive map, secure payments and a live bookings calendar. As 2017 drew to a close, MyLocalPitch signed as London FA's official Bookings Partner and for the Middlesex FA to grow participation numbers.

At the start of 2018 MyLocalPitch became the first London-based SportsTech business to raise more than £1 million and Graeme Le Saux joined the board of directors. In July, the Football Foundation, the largest sports charity in the UK, implemented MyLocalPitch's booking portal for community football venues. An Android app was launched in August 2018.

MyLocalPitch rebranded as Playfinder in the summer of 2019.

== Reception ==
The Daily Mirror listed MyLocalPitch as the best iOS app of 2018.

== Company Expansion ==
Playfinder raised £733,550 to reach 112 per cent of its crowdfunding target and take its overall funding to more than £3.5 million following an earlier private equity raise of £2.85m.
