= Tabard Gardens =

Park in Southwark, London

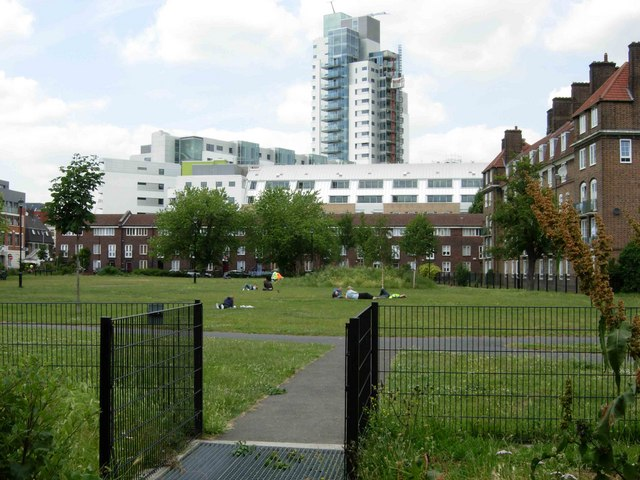

- Location within London Borough of Southwark
- Location: London
- OS grid: TQ327794
- Coordinates: 51°29′55″N 0°05′21″W
- Area: 1.762 hectares (4.354 acres)
- Opened: 1929
- Etymology: From Tabard Street or the former Tabard public house
- Manager: Southwark Council
- Open: Daily from 7:30am until around sunset
- Awards: Green Flag Award
- Facilities: Children’s play area, outdoor gym, table tennis tables, artificial grass pitches, multi-use sports pitches
- Website: www.southwark.gov.uk/parks-and-open-spaces/parks/tabard-gardens

Tabard Gardens is a small park in Southwark, London. It is located on Tabard Street (itself named after the former Tabard public house) and gives its name to the surrounding Tabard Gardens Estate. The park was created as part of a slum clearance programme by the London County Council and opened in 1929. It is owned and managed by Southwark Council.

== Facilities and features ==
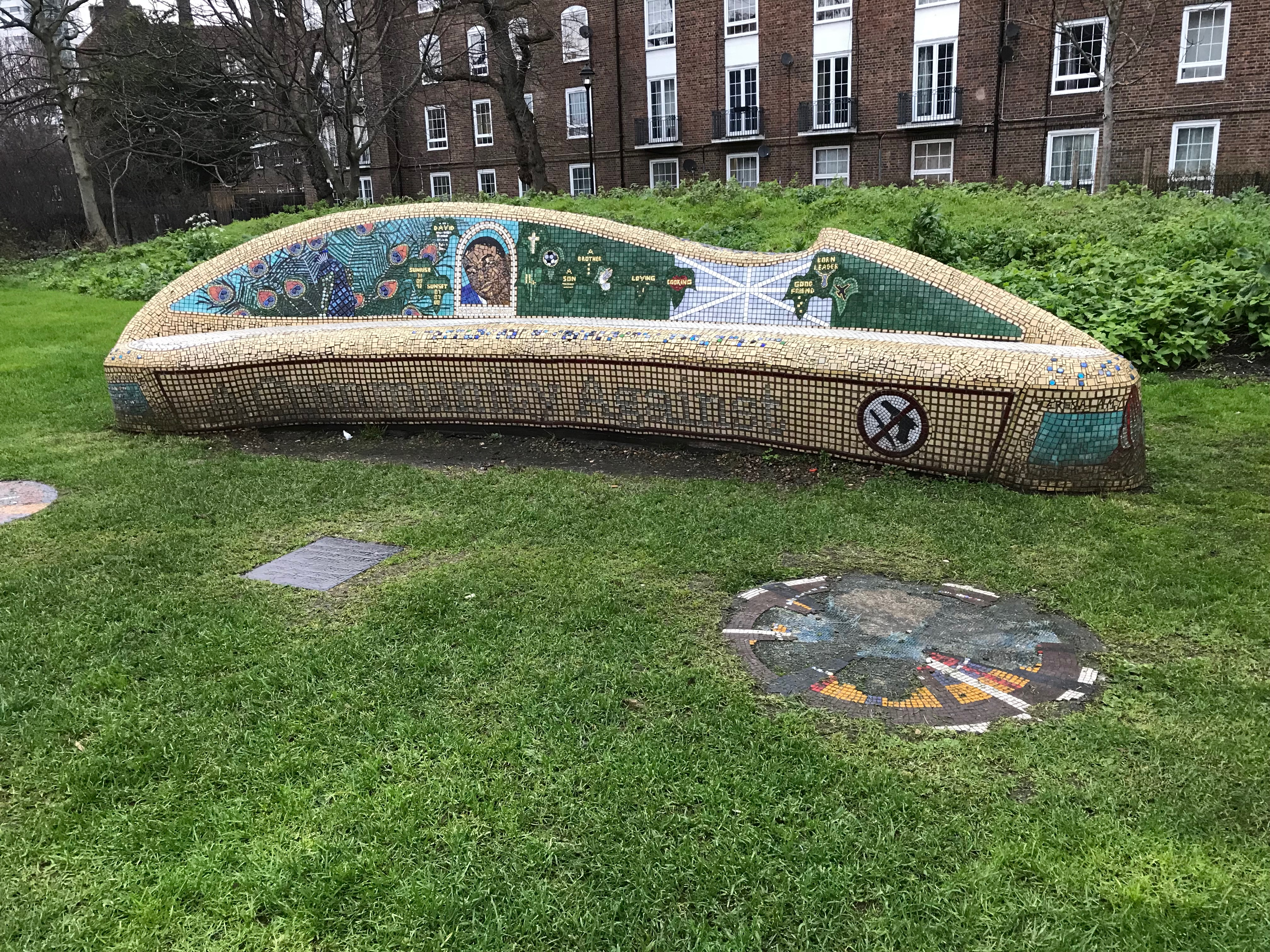
David Idowu memorial bench

Tabard Gardens, which holds a Green Flag Award, has large grassed areas, a wildlife area and a children's play area.

An artificial grass football pitch is available to book for a fee. Either the full pitch or half the pitch can be booked for an hour at a time. Built in 2000 and refurbished in 2008, the pitch won the MyLocalPitch (now Playfinder) outstanding London sports venue award for August 2016.

There are also multi-use sports pitches for games like basketball, which are free to use and do not require booking. A free outdoor gym was installed in 2013. It is situated next to three outdoor table tennis tables. The park hosts boot camp training.

A mosaic memorial bench created by Arthur de Mowbray and Jay James was installed in 2011 to commemorate David Idowu, who was murdered in the park in 2008. A peace event is held in the park most years to mark the anniversary of Idowu's death.

The surrounding Tabard Gardens Estate, but not the park itself, has some of the last remaining stretcher fences in London – these are fences re-purposed from metal stretchers used by Air Raid Precautions wardens to carry Blitz casualties during World War II. The Tabard Gardens Community Allotments are on the surrounding estate, rather than within the park itself.

== History ==
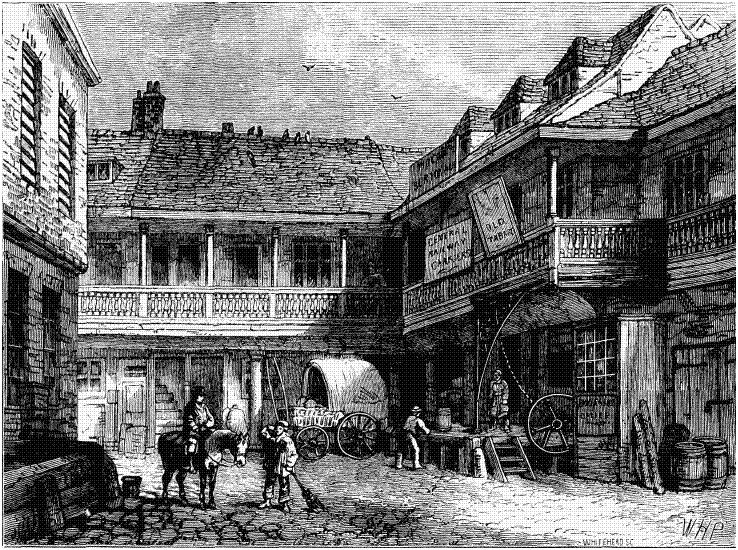
The Tabard inn shortly before its demolition in the 1870s

The Tabard was an inn on Borough High Street established in about 1306 or 1307. It is best known for being a meeting place for pilgrims to the shrine of Thomas à Becket in Canterbury and appears in The Canterbury Tales written by Chaucer in the late 14th century. Around the 17th century it was renamed the Talbot and was probably rebuilt at least twice, including after the 1676 Southwark fire. The replacement building, which may have resembled Chaucer's inn, was demolished in 1874 or 1875, amid protests due to its literary associations.

Tabard Street, renamed after the inn in 1877, was the northern end of Kent Street (the southern portion is now Old Kent Road). Kent Street had been part of the main route between London and the port of Dover until it was supplanted by newer roads. The section that is now Tabard Street was bypassed by the turnpike development of Great Dover Street in about 1814.

By the 20th century Tabard Street was surrounded by notorious slums. The London County Council razed the majority of the eastern side of the street as part of a major slum clearance programme in 1910. From then until 1933 the LCC rebuilt the area as the Tabard Gardens Estate, with large blocks of flats replacing the previous buildings. Of the 10 1/2 acres (4.2 hectares) of the development site, 5 acres (2 hectares) were set aside as a park for the estate, which was called Tabard Gardens and opened in 1929.

On 8 March 1968, a 5-year-old boy, David Lawrence, was found murdered in the toilets in the park. The killer was never found.

On 17 June 2008, David Idowu, 14, was stabbed in the park while playing football. He died at the Royal London Hospital three weeks later on 7 July. 16-year-old Elijah Dayoni was sentenced on 16 January 2009 to life imprisonment with a minimum term of 12 years for Idowu's murder.

Tabard Gardens first won a Green Flag Award in 2013, which it has retained in each subsequent year of the competition up to and including 2022.

An air ambulance landed in Tabard Gardens on 31 October 2014 to treat an 18-year-old man who was stabbed to death outside an off-licence in nearby Pilgrimage Street. Less than a year later, on 29 June 2015, an air ambulance again landed in the park after Lorraine Barwell, a 54-year-old Serco prisoner custody officer, was fatally assaulted at Blackfriars Crown Court.

A large gathering promoted as an "Afro Vibe BBQ" on Saturday 20 June 2020 left the park covered with litter. The following weekend, the police issued an authorisation under the Anti-Social Behaviour, Crime and Policing Act 2014, temporarily allowing them to direct people to leave the area if necessary.
