= Murder of Elsie Frost =

Murder victim from Wakefield, West Yorkshire, England

- Elsie Frost, c. 1965
- Born: 7 February 1951; Wakefield, West Yorkshire, England
- Died: 9 October 1965 (aged 14); Lupset, Wakefield, England
- Cause of death: Shock and haemorrhage due to multiple stab wounds
- Occupation: Student
- Known for: Victim of unsolved murder
- Parent(s): Arthur and Edith (née Stacey) Frost

Elsie Frost (7 February 1951 – 9 October 1965), a 14-year-old school-girl, was killed in an underpass beneath a railway line near to Wakefield, West Riding of Yorkshire, England, on 9 October 1965. Despite a massive manhunt and national coverage, there has been no successful conviction of anyone responsible for her death. In 2015, after pressure from Elsie's family, West Yorkshire Police re-opened the case, and then, in March 2018 the primary suspect died.

== History ==
Elsie had spent the afternoon at Snapethorpe School's sailing club on Horbury Lagoon, a flooded gravel quarry next to the Calder and Hebble canal. When she and her friends left between 3:50 pm and 4:00 pm, (Note: The accounts of Elsie's departure from the sailing club vary. The official Police account is 3:50 pm, some say 3:55 pm and others 4:00 pm) Elsie took a slightly different route from the others, avoiding a partially flooded tunnel, possibly to prevent her new shoes getting muddy. She was attacked while walking through a tunnel underneath the railway line that runs between Wakefield Kirkgate railway station and Horbury. She was stabbed five times: twice in the head, once in the hand and twice in the back, with one of the knife wounds piercing her heart, causing her death. The wound in her hand led the police to believe that it was sustained while trying to defend herself. The post-mortem showed that Elsie had died of shock and blood loss.

She made it through the underpass and collapsed at the bottom of the ABC steps, as they are known locally (because there are 26 of them as there are in the English alphabet). She was found at 4:12 pm by a man who was out walking with his 3- and 5-year-old children.

Over 1,200 written statements were taken: four hundred people who lived within a 0.25 mi (0.40 km) radius of the murder scene were traced and had their movements checked, over 12,000 men were interviewed and a large number of knives belonging to local residents were examined.

Despite an intensive police enquiry, coupled with national coverage (the manhunt was the biggest that the city of Wakefield had ever seen), the police were unable to establish a motive for the crime or indeed, if Elsie was the intended victim or a passerby who happened to be in the wrong place at the wrong time. The manhunt was later expanded using the army, and also involved the use of metal detectors in an attempt to find the murder weapon.

== Inquest accusation ==
In January 1966, the deputy coroner, Philip Gill, presiding over the inquest into Elsie's death decided that Ian Bernard Spencer, who was 33 at the time, was the man guilty of killing Elsie. Spencer maintained that although he was in the area of Elsie's death earlier in the day, he was at home during the time that Elsie was murdered. Despite this being corroborated by his wife, his mother-in-law and a family friend, the three witnesses were not called to give evidence on his behalf at the inquest.

Until 1984, (Note: The Coroners Rules 1984; Rule 42 specifically prohibits a coroner from determining any criminal or civil liability) a coroner's inquest could apportion blame and guilt and recommend criminal proceedings to be brought against an individual, which is what happened to Mr Spencer. The coroner stated that there was sufficient prima facie evidence against him.

Even though Ian Spencer had been cleared by two courts with one judge instructing a jury to acquit, police still routinely turned up at the Spencer family home whenever there had been a knife crime in the area. Mr Spencer took to writing down what time he left one place and then the time he arrived at the next, including the mileage he had travelled. He carried on creating these logbooks throughout his working life and on into retirement.

The Frost family were convinced at the time that Spencer had nothing to do with Elsie's death; Elsie's mother, Edith Frost, stated:

I know what Mr Spencer and his wife must have suffered, I am glad for their sakes it is over. I am sure they will be as anxious as I am to have the killer found.

== Cold case ==
Pressure from Elsie's brother and sister (Anne Cleave and Colin Frost) and coverage of the murder on an investigative BBC Radio 4 programme prompted West Yorkshire Police to re-open the case in 2015, 50 years after the killing. The new investigation produced 100 lines of enquiry, a response that the police found encouraging. The Major Investigation Review team was staffed by serving officers as well as civilians, most of whom were retired detectives. The review team disclosed that most of the original files from 1965 had been destroyed.

After the programme was aired on Radio 4, several listeners gave accounts of what they had seen leading to fresh evidence and new theories. Members of the public submitted Freedom of Information requests to The National Archives for the murder files, which were not due to be opened until 2030 and 2060. The requests were denied on the grounds that the police files name other suspected individuals other than the man sent to trial in 1966. The release into the public domain of this information may have harmed any future criminal proceedings. There were also notes that the files contains post-mortem images and reports which could be distressing for the immediate family. It was revealed during the investigation by Radio 4 that Elsie's clothes had been offered to the family, but when the offer was declined the clothes were then destroyed by the police. Despite there being no knowledge of the science of DNA in 1965, this effectively ended any hope of possible DNA retrieval.

There have been other suspects and theories: one was that Elsie had stumbled across two men engaged in a homosexual act (homosexual acts were illegal in Britain up until 1967). Another witness has described seeing a man in his mid-twenties, dressed in white overalls and on a bike. This led to suggestions that the man, who could be a witness, was a butcher's delivery boy or an abattoir worker.

Another theory was that Elsie was meeting someone in the days before her death, possibly a boyfriend. Her father had said that the night before she died she went to Balne Lane Youth Club in her best clothes, rather than her normal attire and she had asked to stay out later than usual (though she actually came home no later than usual).

Another lead was proffered by a school acquaintance of Elsie's, who, as a nurse, had heard a third-hand account of a man confessing in hospital to being present during her killing. He claimed to have been involved in a homosexual act when Elsie happened across them, the man he was involved with then pursued after her. This tied in with the homosexual act angle as the man apparently confessed to that taking place and being the reason behind Elsie's death. While this new information was forwarded to the police, it is unreliable because of its third-hand nature and the man was allegedly under the influence of drugs when he made his confession.

On 27 September 2016, it was announced that Thames Valley Police had arrested a 78-year-old man in connection with Elsie's death. It was revealed on 29 September 2016 that the man had been bailed after his arrest. On 6 March 2017 it was reported that the same man had been re-arrested in connection with Elsie's death and that he was also being questioned in relation to an unconnected allegation of rape and kidnap in 1972.

On 25 March 2018, it was reported that the hitherto unnamed suspect was Peter Pickering, convicted of the 1972 manslaughter of 14-year-old Shirley Boldy in Wombwell, near Barnsley, for which he was serving life in prison. Pickering had died in a secure hospital the previous day. Detective Superintendent Nick Wallen of West Yorkshire Police said they had "strongly suspected" he was responsible and "it was our expectation" the Crown Prosecution Service would have decided to charge him in due course.

In July 2018, it was revealed that the Frost family would be lobbying the Attorney-General for a new inquest where they could ask that the evidence against Pickering be looked at. The family stated that they felt "cheated and robbed" by Pickering's death as he would not go in front of a jury, but that a new inquest would be the next best thing. Their request was granted in December 2018 with the attorney general stating

I am satisfied that there is new evidence available that was not put before the previous inquest, and I believe that it is in the interests of justice for the application for a new inquest to be heard by the High Court.

This inquest eventually took place at the end of 2019, finally clearing Ian Spencer, who had also died the previous year, and confirming Peter Pickering as the real killer, although he could never be brought to justice.

== See also ==
- Cold case
- List of unsolved murders in the United Kingdom (before 1970)
- Unsolved murders in the United Kingdom

== Cited works and further reading ==
- Nash, Jay Robert (1983). Open Files: A Narrative Encyclopedia of the World's Greatest Unsolved Crimes. London: The Rowman & Littlefield Publishing Group, Inc. ISBN 978-0-07045907-6.
- Turton, Kevin (2019). Britain's Unsolved Murders. Barnsley: Pen & Sword. ISBN 978-1-526-72632-2.
- Wade, Stephen (2009). Yorkshire Murders & Misdemeanours. Stroud: Amberley Publishing. ISBN 978-1-445-63254-4.
- Wade, Stephen (2004). Unsolved Yorkshire Murders. Stroud: Wharncliffe Books. ISBN 978-1-903-42560-2.
- Wilson, Colin (1995). Written in Blood: A History of Forensic Detection. London: Harper Collins. ISBN 978-0-58620-842-7.
