= Marshalls Heath =

Hamlet and nature reserve in Hertfordshire, England

Coordinates: 51.8207°N 0.3169°W

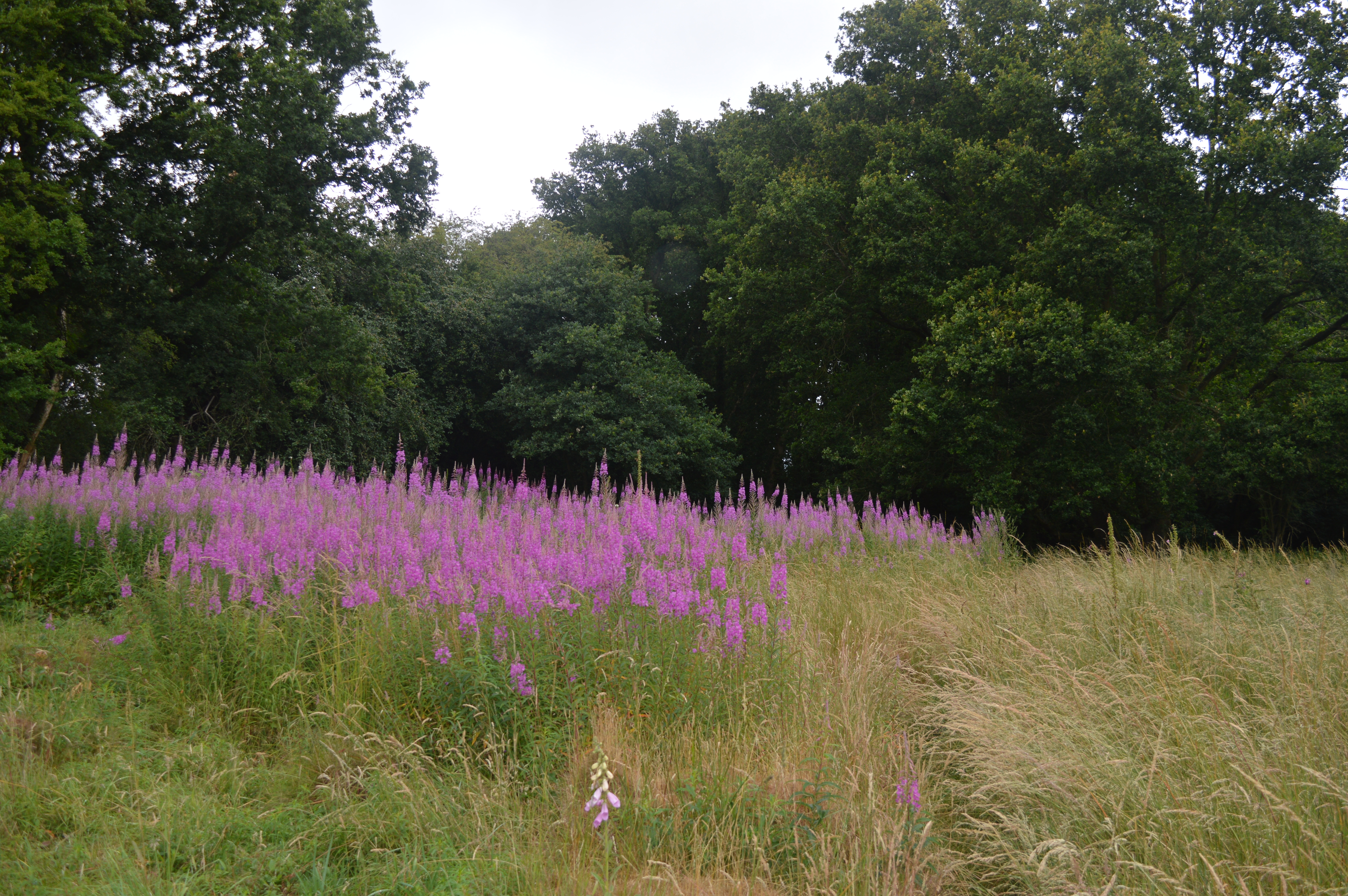

Marshalls Heath is a hamlet and a 4-hectare (10-acre) Local Nature Reserve in Wheathampstead parish, Hertfordshire, England. The nature reserve is owned by Wheathampstead Parish Council and managed by the council together with the Friends of Marshalls Heath. It was purchased from The Queen's College, Oxford, in 1966.

The site is acid heath on both sides of Marshalls Heath Lane. It is secondary woodland and scrub, but the many species recorded include forty on national lists of threatened species. Yellow hill ants are very common, and it is one of the key Hertfordshire sites for butterflies and moths. The site was managed by the Herts and Middlesex Wildlife Trust between 1972 and 1993, when the council terminated the agreement with the trust.
