= Murder of the Grimes sisters =

1956 unsolved double murder case

Barbara and Patricia Grimes
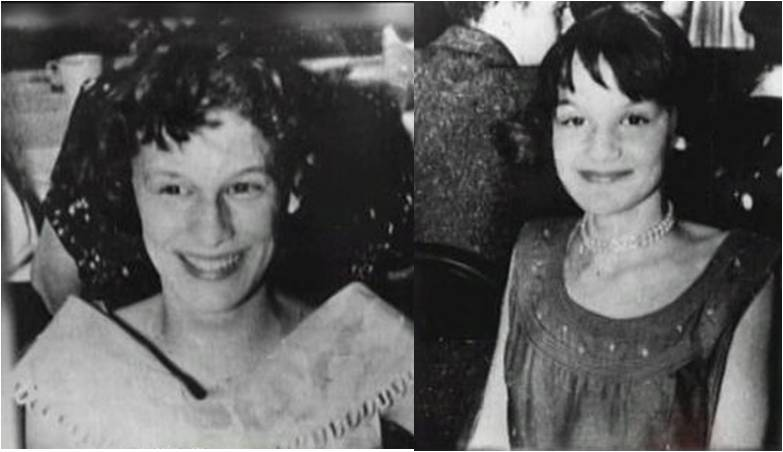
- Barbara (left) and Patricia Grimes (right) c. 1956
- Born: Barbara Jeanne Grimes; May 5, 1941; Patricia Kathleen Grimes; December 31, 1943; Cook County, Illinois U.S.
- Disappeared: December 28, 1956; Brighton Park, Illinois, U.S.
- Died: December 28 or 29, 1956
- Cause of death: Secondary shock. Murder (Note: The official death certificates of both Barbara and Patricia Grimes state their causes of death as being murder; the specific means of which, in both cases, is attributed as being secondary shock.)
- Body discovered: January 22, 1957; Willow Springs, Illinois, U.S.
- Resting place: Holy Sepulchre Cemetery, Alsip, Illinois, U.S. 41.686806°N 87.761269°W
- Citizenship: United States
- Occupation: Students
- Known for: Victims of unsolved child murder

The murder of the Grimes sisters is an unsolved double murder that occurred in Chicago, Illinois, on December 28, 1956, in which two sisters named Barbara and Patricia Grimes—aged 15 and 12 (Note: Patricia Grimes was born on December 31, 1943. Although several sources list her age as thirteen, she was twelve when last seen alive.) respectively—disappeared while traveling from a Brighton Park movie theater to their home in McKinley Park. Their disappearance initiated one of the largest missing persons investigations in the history of Chicago. The girls' nude bodies were discovered alongside a deserted road in Willow Springs on January 22, 1957.

Although the sisters' autopsy reports concluded they had been murdered within five hours of their last confirmed sighting, and that both girls had died of secondary shock, numerous individuals attested to having seen the girls alive in the weeks between the night of December 28 and the subsequent discovery of their bodies.

The murder of the Grimes sisters has been described by authors as a crime that "shattered the innocence" of Chicago. This case is also acknowledged as one of the most labor-intensive missing person and murder investigations in Cook County, and remains one of Chicago's most infamous cold cases.

== Disappearance ==
On December 28, 1956, two of the seven children born to Joseph Cornelius and Lorretta Marcela (née Hayes) Grimes—sisters Barbara, 15, and Patricia, 12—opted to view a screening of the Elvis Presley film Love Me Tender at a Brighton Park theater. Barbara and Patricia have been described as being inseparable sisters, and attentive students at the Thomas Kelly High School and St. Maurice's Catholic School which they, respectively, attended. They are also known to have been devoted fans of Presley, and both had recently joined his official fan club. This particular occasion was the eleventh time the girls had viewed this particular film, and the sisters are known to have left their residence at approximately 7:30 p.m., promising their mother they would be home before midnight. (Note: Joseph and Lorretta Grimes had divorced in December 1951. The divorce had been on amicable terms, with all the Grimes children maintaining regular contact with their father.)

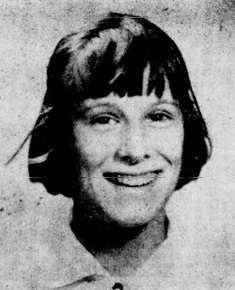
Barbara Grimes

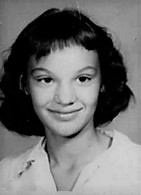
Patricia Grimes

The Brighton Theater was located approximately one-and-a-half miles from the girls' McKinley Park home, and Barbara and Patricia are presumed to have had approximately $2.50 (the equivalent of about $29.80 as of 2026) when they departed, with Barbara instructed to keep fifty cents of this money in the zipper of her wallet should the two girls opt to view a second screening of this film scheduled to be shown at the theater that evening. It is unknown how the sisters traveled to the Brighton Theater on this particular date, although they had always walked or traveled by bus to this destination previously.

A school friend of Patricia named Dorothy Weinert later informed investigators she was seated behind the girls with her own younger sister during the film, although Weinert and her sister left the theater at the intermission of the double feature, at approximately 9:30 p.m. While leaving, Dorothy saw the Grimes sisters queueing to purchase popcorn. (Note: Of the $2.50 in the sisters' possession on the night of their disappearance, $1.50 had been intended for the admission fee to the Brighton Theater for both girls; 50 cents had been given for two boxes of popcorn, and the final fifty cents had been intended as the fare for the bus ride home for both girls.) The two seemed in good spirits, and neither Weinert sister noticed anything untoward in their demeanor.

Both sisters stayed to view the second screening of Love Me Tender, thus meaning they would be expected to return home at approximately 11:45 p.m. When the girls had not arrived home by midnight, their mother, Lorretta, sent their older sister, Theresa (aged 17), and brother Joey (aged 14) to wait by the bus stop located closest to the family home for their arrival. After three successive buses had driven by without either girl arriving at the designated stop, both siblings returned home. Having by this stage already unsuccessfully contacted the girls' friends in the hope her daughters might be at one of their homes, and upon the return of Theresa and Joey to the family home without their sisters, Lorretta Grimes filed missing person reports on her daughters with the Chicago Police Department at 2:15 a.m. on December 29.

=== Investigation ===
The disappearance of the Grimes sisters sparked one of the largest missing person cases in the history of Cook County. A citywide search for the girls was quickly initiated, to which hundreds of police officers were assigned full-time. Cook County officers were assisted by colleagues from surrounding suburbs, and a task force devoted solely to locating the sisters was formed, with the ground search initiated on December 29 being bolstered by hundreds of local volunteers. Police conducted door-to-door canvassing throughout Brighton Park, and numerous canals and rivers were dredged. In addition, more than 15,000 flyers were distributed to local homes, and parishioners of the sisters' church offered a $1,000 reward (the equivalent of about $11,900 as of 2026) for information leading to their whereabouts. As a result of this co-ordinated investigation, 300,000 people would be questioned, with some 2,000 individuals subjected to serious interrogation pertaining to their potential culpability, although the two arrests and charges brought against individuals who confessed to the crime subsequently collapsed. One individual, Edward Bedwell, asserted he had been coerced into giving a confession after being subjected to a prolonged interrogation.

Despite police efforts, and extensive media appeals producing many reported sightings of the girls, little in the way of hard evidence was yielded, although several teenagers who had been at the Brighton Theater on December 28 did inform investigators they had seen the sisters conversing with, then entering a car driven by a young man whose physical appearance had been similar to that of Elvis Presley. The vehicle described by these eyewitnesses was consistently described as being a Mercury model.

Prior to the implementation of the task force, and despite protests from the girls' parents, several investigators initially assigned to the case theorized the sisters had either run away from home or were voluntarily staying with boyfriends. Although the sisters were front-page news by December 31, their disappearance would only be seriously considered as a missing persons case—and thus appropriately treated as such—by investigators after approximately one week had passed without family and friends receiving any form of contact from either girl. Nonetheless, extensive media appeals were conducted, imploring both sisters to return home, and for any eyewitnesses to contact police. As a result, numerous alleged sightings of the sisters would be reported to police as late as January 9, and these reports often described one or both of the girls as having been seen in various business establishments. These sightings supported several investigators' initial theories the girls had opted to leave home of their own accord.

Theories also abounded that the sisters may have traveled to Nashville, Tennessee, to see Presley in concert, (Note: One of many eyewitness reports received by the Chicago Police Department in January 1957 came from an individual named Pearl Neville, who claimed to have seen the "tired, bedraggled" girls at a bus station in Nashville, thus leading to the possibility the girls had traveled to Tennessee to visit their idol.) or had simply left their home of their own volition as a means of emulating Presley's lifestyle. In the event her daughters had actually been kidnapped, Lorretta Grimes publicly pleaded: "If someone is holding them, please let the girls call me", adding: "I'll forgive them from the bottom of my heart."

On January 19, 1957, an official statement was issued from Presley's Graceland estate. This televised statement read: "If you are good Presley fans, you'll go home and ease your mother's worries." Presley also made a direct radio plea to the Grimes sisters, imploring the girls to return home to their mother.

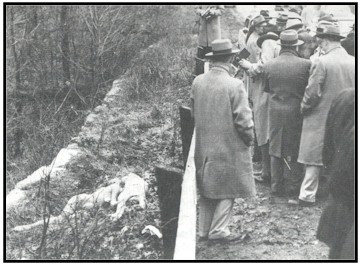
Investigators converge alongside German Church Road, January 22, 1957, following the discovery of the bodies of Barbara and Patricia Grimes.

== Discovery ==
On January 22, 1957, following a rapid thaw of recent snowfall, a construction worker named Leonard Prescott spotted what he later described as being "these flesh-colored things" behind a guard rail as he drove along a rural country road named German Church Road, approximately 200 feet (61 m) east of County Line Road in unincorporated Willow Springs. Initially unsure of the origin of what he had seen, and believing the forms might be mannequins, Prescott later returned to the site with his wife Marie, who fainted upon taking a closer look. The forms were actually the nude, frozen bodies of the Grimes sisters, and the Prescotts immediately reported their findings to the Willow Springs Police Department. (Note: Upon hearing of the discovery of her daughters' bodies, Lorretta Grimes lamented: "My poor babies. If the police had listened to me they would have had the true story half an hour after [the girls] were missing.") (Note: Initially, both investigators and the media speculated the Grimes sisters' murders may be linked to the murders of three Chicago schoolboys whose nude bodies had been found in a forest preserve in October 1955, with Cook County Sheriff Joseph Lohman stating there had been "remarkable similarities" in both cases of multiple murder. Another individual would be convicted of the 1955 triple homicide in 2002.)

The girls' bodies lay upon a flat, horizontal section of snow-covered ground directly behind the guard rail, which extended for just 10 feet (3.0 m) before the incline of the embankment of Devil's Creek. Barbara lay on her left side, with her legs drawn slightly up toward her torso. Patricia lay on her back, with her body covering her sister's head, and her own head turned sharply to the right. It is believed the sisters had most likely been driven to this location in a car, with their bodies then being dragged or lifted out of the vehicle, then placed or thrown behind the guard rail. Three wounds resembling those typically inflicted by ice picks were discovered upon Barbara's chest and injuries resembling blunt force trauma were visible upon her face and head, while numerous injuries resembling bruises were discovered upon Patricia's face and body. The girls' father, Joseph Grimes, was driven to the crime scene to formally identify both bodies. (Note: Upon his arrival at the crime scene, Joseph Grimes simply glanced at the bodies before stating, "Yes, they are my daughters" before slumping forward in bouts of tears. He had to be supported from the scene by police officers. Given Joseph Grimes' evident distress, another family relative later made a formal identification of the girls in a Cook County morgue.)

Following Joseph's initial positive identification of the bodies, over 160 police officers from several suburban Chicago police departments—assisted by numerous local volunteers— conducted a search of the crime scene with the additional assistance of the Forest Preserves. This search uncovered little or no real evidence linked to the crime (any potential link any item discovered at the crime scene had to the murders has never been determined), and the search itself was later criticized due to those organizing the search allowing untrained individuals to trample over any evidence that may have been at the location. (Note: Several hours after the discovery of the girls' bodies, the area surrounding the discovery would be cordoned until the scene could be appropriately examined by crime scene experts.)

=== Autopsies ===
The decedents' autopsies were performed the day following their discovery by three experienced forensic pathologists who, following a five-hour examination of each body, were unable to reach agreement on either a date or a cause of death. These experts did determine via an examination of the sisters' stomach contents (that contained the approximate proportions of the last known meals and subsequent snacks the sisters had eaten on the evening of December 28) that both girls had most likely died within approximately five hours of the time they had last been seen alive at the Brighton Theater, thus fixing the most likely time of death in each instance to have been either the late evening of December 28 or the early morning of December 29. The cause of death in each case was ruled as being a combination of shock and exposure, although each pathologist reached this conclusion via a process of eliminating other causes. In addition, these experts concluded that many wounds discovered upon the bodies were most likely inflicted by rodents, with the actual puncture wounds most likely inflicted after death.

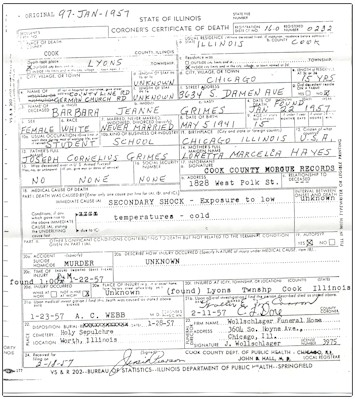
Death certificate of Barbara Grimes

No obviously fatal wounds were discovered on either girl's body, and toxicology reports revealed that neither girl had been drunk, drugged, or poisoned prior to her death. No items of the sisters' clothing were ever found, although their bodies were described by the pathologists as being markedly clean. The autopsies would also discover that Barbara had likely engaged in sexual intercourse—either consensually or unconsensually—around the time of her death, although no evidence of forcible molestation was found. The official death certificates of both Barbara and Patricia would list their cause of death as murder; the specific means of which, in both cases, was listed as "secondary shock" resulting from exposure to low temperatures, which had reduced each girl's body temperature "below the critical level compatible with life." (Note: Although the official pathological report attributed the girls' deaths to exposure, in an interview given to the News and Courier, one of the doctors referred to the deaths as "brutal homicides", adding: "Those girls could not have died naturally.")

One of the coroners to perform the autopsies, Walter McCarron, surmised the sisters' bodies had lain undiscovered behind the guard rail on German Church Road for many days before their eventual discovery, stating that the bodies' markedly preserved condition given the time interval between their disappearance and discovery had been due to the frigid temperatures in the weeks prior to January 22, adding that this had been due to recent snowfalls and the frigid climate. McCarron also concluded the girls' bodies had lain undiscovered for more than three weeks because a layer of snow had blanketed the area on January 9, and that this snowfall had rapidly melted in the days immediately prior to their discovery.

Despite these official conclusions, the chief investigator for the Cook County Coroner's Office, Harry Glos, disagreed with the official time of death, later stating to the media there had been numerous "marks of violence on those girls' faces" strongly indicative of their being the recipients of violence as opposed to postmortem rodent infestation. Glos also contended that a thin layer of ice found encrusted upon the sisters' bodies indicated they had most likely been alive until at least January 7, since only after that date would there have been sufficient snowfall to react with the girls' natural body heat in such a climate and thus create the layer of ice discovered upon their nude bodies in this location. Glos contended this proved their bodies had been warm when they had been deposited beside German Church Road, since only after January 7 had there been sufficient snow to create such an ice layer upon and around their bodies.

In addition to these facts, Glos also stated that both girls had been subjected to sexual assaults throughout their period of captivity, adding that the autopsy conducted upon Patricia had discovered semen within the vaginal fluid swabbed from her body, and that curdled milk had also been found in Barbara's stomach, when she is not known to have drunk milk either at her home or at the cinema on the evening of December 28.

== Official controversies ==
The chief investigator of the Cook County coroner's office, Harry Glos, strongly believed an official suspect in the case named Edward Bedwell had been the individual who had committed the sisters' murders. Glos asserted that the wound marks noted upon the girls' bodies in their autopsies had neither been adequately investigated or considered. He would also further assert his opinion that the wounding and assault marks had been evidence that the girls had been beaten prior to their murder and, in tandem with the evidence of sexual activity, were thus in line with the claims Bedwell provided to investigators in his January 1957 interrogations. (Note: Glos would also assert the autopsy reports, in conjunction with circumstantial evidence, unequivocally revealed that both sisters had been held captive for a minimum of ten days prior to their murder, adding that throughout the period of their captivity, both girls had been subjected to repeated beatings, torture, and sexual assaults.) Glos would also claim that investigators had refused to disclose these and potentially other lurid details of the case due to a possible desire to protect the girls' reputations and/or spare their mother's feelings. Similar allegations were repeated in later years by others, some of whom claimed to have both seen the original case files, and to have interviewed numerous McKinley Park residents who alleged both girls had been in the habit of spending free time outside bars on 36th Street and Archer Avenue, where they regularly persuaded older men to purchase alcoholic drinks to be delivered to them outside the premises.

Despite Glos's insistence that the pathologists had "[taken] the girls off Madison Street and put them into respectability", investigators connected to the case continued to insist that there had been no evidence of either girl being disreputable, or the recipient of extreme violence or sexual molestation prior to her death.

After refusing to retract his statements, Glos was fired by Coroner Walter E. McCarron on February 15, although Glos would insist his firing had been politically motivated. Nonetheless, Glos would later be deputized by Sheriff Joseph D. Lohman—who concurred with Glos's conviction the girls had likely been beaten and tortured by a sexual predator who had lured them into his vehicle upon an innocent pretense—to continue to work on the case without pay.

== Sightings ==
Between the last confirmed sighting of the sisters at the Brighton Theater on December 28, 1956, and the subsequent discovery of their bodies 25 days later, several unconfirmed sightings of the sisters both in and outside Chicago were reported to the Chicago Police Department. The most widely reported sightings include the following:

- Numerous people stated to investigators they had seen the girls boarding a Chicago Transit Authority bus on Archer Avenue heading east into the city after the screening. Those who reported this sighting to police included the bus driver. The sisters allegedly alighted at Western Avenue, approximately halfway between the theater and their home, at approximately 11:05 p.m. Why the sisters would exit the bus at Western Avenue is unknown. (Note: Investigators would question the accuracy of at least part of this sighting due to the fact the bus driver would state he believed he had heard the sisters mentioning their intention to board an oncoming northbound Western Avenue trolley, which traveled in the direction opposite their home.)
- A young man named Roger Menard informed investigators he had also attended the December 28 screening of Love Me Tender, having sat behind Barbara and Patricia Grimes and close to Weinert. According to Menard, he had left the theater approximately one minute before the sisters, who had walked down Archer Avenue a short distance behind him before a "late model, green Buick" had stopped alongside them. The girls hesitated, before continuing walking. Just past 42nd Street, with the sisters by this stage walking ahead of him, a black 1949 Mercury occupied by two teenage boys pulled alongside the girls, although they simply giggled before continuing walking in the direction of their home.
- Two teenage boys named Ed Lorden and Earl Zastro informed investigators that while they had been driving through McKinley Park at approximately 11:30 p.m. on December 28, they had seen the sisters on 35th Street. Reportedly, the two had been "giggling and jumping out of doorways at each other" near Seeley and Damen Avenues, with one youth exclaiming to the other that they were "those two Grimes sisters" as they passed them. At this point the girls would have been approximately two blocks from their home.
- A security guard named Jack Franklin later informed investigators he had offered directions to two girls on the morning of December 29, approximately twelve hours after they had left the theater. This verbal exchange had allegedly occurred near Lawrence and Central Park Avenues, and Franklin later concluded the girls had been the Grimes sisters, adding the sole reason he had recalled this conversation was that both girls had been both rude and abrupt to him.
- On the same date of Franklin's alleged sighting of Barbara and Patricia, a friend of Barbara's named Judy Burrow reported to investigators she had seen the sisters at approximately 2:30 p.m., walking westward on Archer Avenue (two blocks from Damen Avenue).

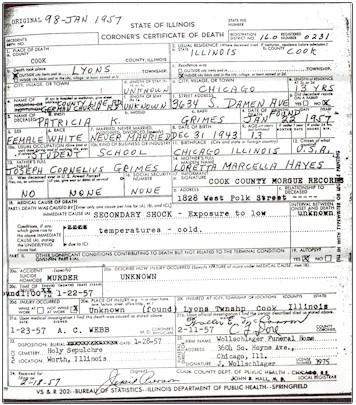
Death certificate of Patricia Grimes

- A classmate of Patricia's named Catherine Borak was adamant she had seen Patricia walking past a restaurant Borak had been inside in the early evening of December 29. According to Borak, Patricia had been in the company of two unidentified young girls. This sighting was followed by another, six hours later, by a cashier at the Clark Theater in downtown Chicago, who claimed she had seen both girls at 12:45 a.m.
- A railroad conductor named Bernard Norton reported seeing the two girls aboard a train near the Great Lakes Naval Training Center in north suburban Glenview. According to Norton, the two girls had been searching for two sailors named "Terry" and "Larry."
- On December 30 at 5:40 am, the owner of the D&L Restaurant at 1340 West Madison said he had seen both girls, with Patricia apparently too drunk or too sick to walk without staggering, accompanied by official suspect Edward Bedwell. This location was over five-and-a-half miles from the Brighton Theater. A clerk at the Claremont Hotel, after viewing the bodies at a mortuary, likewise identified the sisters as having checked into the hotel on this date.
- On January 1, 1957, the girls were reported as having been seen aboard a Chicago Transit Authority bus on Damen Avenue.
- The following week, a night clerk at the Unity Hotel on West 61st street refused two girls a room because of their age. This clerk believed the girls in question had been the Grimes sisters.
- On January 3, three employees at an Englewood Kresge department store claimed to have seen both girls listening to music at the store's record counter. Each employee stated the sisters had been listening to music by Elvis Presley.
- Adding credence to the theory that both sisters had run away to Nashville, on January 17, a woman named Pearl Neville contacted investigators to state she had met both girls in a Nashville restroom on January 9, and that she had accompanied them to a state employment agency to search for work. According to Neville, both girls had been in what she described as being a "tired, bedraggled" condition. A clerk at this agency would later identify the sisters from photographs, also recalling that both girls had used the surname "Grimes" in the application forms they had populated.
- In the early hours of January 14, the parents of a classmate of Patricia Grimes named Sandra Tollstan received two separate, anonymous telephone calls. During the first call, nobody at the other end spoke. Picking up the second phone call approximately 15 minutes later, Sandra's mother, Ann, heard a "frightened and depressed" young female voice asking, "Is that you, Sandra? Is Sandra there?" Before Ann could bring her daughter to the phone, the call was terminated. Mrs. Tollstan informed investigators of her conviction that the caller had been Patricia Grimes.

"Outside the show we all got to talking and we exchanged phone numbers. When we got to the street where we turned off, we said goodbye and we ran across the street. Then Betty forgot something she had to tell Barbara and we ran back to the corner ... A man about 22 or 25 was talking to them. He pushed Barbara in the back seat of the car and Pat in the front seat. We got part of the license number as the car drove by us. The first four numbers were 2184. Betty thinks there were three or four numbers after that ... When we heard that they were missing we didn't know what to do."

— Section of an anonymous letter sent to Chicago Sun-Times advice columnist Ann Landers, January 1957.
- Following the January 19 television and radio appeal by Elvis Presley imploring the sisters to return home, Chicago Sun-Times advice columnist Ann Landers received an anonymous letter, allegedly written by a girl who claimed to have witnessed the sisters being forced into a car by a young male on the night of their disappearance. Although a partial license number was provided with this letter, subsequent police endeavors to trace the vehicle proved fruitless. The author of this letter was never identified, and the actual contents were never authenticated.

== Suspects ==
=== Edward Bedwell ===
Edward Lee "Bennie" Bedwell was a 21-year-old semi-literate drifter, originally from Tennessee, who had been evicted from his family's East Garfield Park home in November 1956 and in the weeks preceding the Grimes sisters' murder had occasionally earned money by working as a part-time dishwasher in a Chicago skid row restaurant. Bedwell was a tall individual who allegedly bore a strong resemblance to Elvis Presley. According to John and Minnie Duros (the owners of the restaurant where Bedwell had been employed), he and another young male had been at her premises in the company of two girls who physically resembled the Grimes sisters in the early morning of December 30. Duros conveyed this information to police on January 24. Bedwell was arrested thereafter and subjected to interrogation for three days.

Initially, Bedwell was insistent that John and Minnie Duros and a patron named Rene Echols (who had corroborated the Duros's eyewitness statements) were mistaken in their identification of the girls he had been in the company of on December 30. However, he was formally charged with the sisters' murders on January 27, 1957, having signed a 14-page confession in which he said that he and a 28-year-old acquaintance named William Cole Willingham had indeed been in the company of the Grimes sisters on December 30. He stated that they were together until January 7—typically drinking in various West Madison Street skid row saloons. According to Bedwell, after several days in the girls' willing company, shortly after he and his companion had fed the sisters hot dogs, they had extensively beaten both girls before throwing their nude bodies into a snow-filled ditch when both sisters had refused their sexual advances. Upon reading Bedwell's confession, Lorretta Grimes was quoted as stating: "It's a lie. My girls wouldn't be on West Madison Street. They didn't even know where it was."

Willingham admitted he had been in the company of Bedwell and two girls in the early hours of December 30, but denied the girls had been the Grimes sisters. He also emphatically denied any involvement in the murders; Bedwell himself would later recant the confession he had provided to investigators, stating that he had only provided a confession after being held in custody for four days in the mistaken belief the police would subsequently release him if he did so. At the commencement of a three-day habeas corpus hearing beginning January 31, Bedwell testified he had concocted his confession due to his being the recipient of threats, bribery, and occasional physical violence throughout his interrogations.

Two teenage cousins named Irene Dean (age 19) and Carol King (age 18) would later inform investigators they had likely been the two girls who had accompanied Bedwell and Willingham to the restaurant in the early hours of either December 29 or 30. Dean would state her cousin had "paired off" with Willingham while she (Dean) had been Bedwell's date. Minnie Duros would recollect having seen Irene Dean in the restaurant on other dates, but never in Bedwell's company.

The autopsy reports upon both girls also supported Bedwell's recantation, as no alcohol or hot dogs were found in either victim's blood or digestive systems, nor had the girls been beaten to death. Furthermore, Bedwell is also known to have been clocked in at Ajax Consolidated Company, his place of employment, from 4:19 p.m. on December 28, 1956, to 12:30 a.m. on December 29, covering the most likely time of the sisters' abduction, with further records confirming Bedwell had been working in Cicero on the date he said he had murdered them. On February 6, Bedwell was freed on a $20,000 bond (the equivalent of about $230,700 as of 2026) paid for by an individual from Champaign. All charges filed against Bedwell would be officially dropped on March 4 due to the numerous inconsistencies in his confession in relation to the physical and circumstantial evidence obtained and determined. Furthermore, Bedwell was officially classified as being a "mentally retarded individual".

The same year of his acquittal, Bedwell would be tried and acquitted of the 1956 rape of a 13-year-old girl in Oak Hill, Florida. He died in November 1972.

=== Max Fleig ===
Max Fleig was a 17-year-old suspect in the sisters' murders. Initially considered one of the prime suspects, due to his age Fleig was protected by contemporary Illinois laws that prevented juveniles from subjection to polygraph tests. Nonetheless, Chicago Police Captain Ralph Petacque persuaded the teenager to submit to an unofficial polygraph test, which Fleig voluntarily undertook. In the course of this unofficial polygraph test, Fleig allegedly confessed to the murders. With no legal means of using this test as evidence against Fleig, police were forced to release him without charge.

In addition, police were unable to charge Fleig with the murders due to there being a lack of physical evidence corroborating his confession that he had kidnapped and subsequently killed the sisters. (Note: When Lorretta Grimes was informed that Illinois law prohibited juveniles from subjection to polygraph testing, she praised police efforts to persuade Fleig to submit to an unofficial polygraph test, but publicly slated the Law of Illinois that protected an alleged murderer simply due to his age.)

Fleig was later jailed for the unrelated murder of a young woman.

=== Walter Kranz ===
Walter Kranz, a 53-year-old steamfitter and self-proclaimed psychic, phoned a switchboard operator at Chicago's central police complaint room on January 15 to inform of his conviction that both sisters were deceased and that their bodies could be found in an unincorporated area of Lyons Township. Kranz refused to disclose his name to the operator in this phone call, simply stating that he had experienced this revelation in a dream, before terminating the call. Nonetheless, the operator traced the call to a location close to his home.

The park described by Kranz in his telephone call would prove to be approximately one mile from the true location where the girls' bodies would be just found one week later. When questioned, Kranz informed police that several members of his family and ancestors possessed psychic powers, and that he had experienced this particular vision after a night of heavy drinking.

Although initially considered by police to be their "number one suspect" in the murders, and with handwriting experts also determining he may have written a ransom note received by the girls' mother prior to the discovery of her daughters' bodies, Kranz denied any involvement in the sisters' abduction and murder. After being subjected to multiple interrogations, he was released.

"They were nice, ordinary little girls. Poor and happy—we all were. Their mother had to work and she assigned them housework, like mopping the floors. Our idea of fun was to pour soapy water over them and slide around in our bare feet, giggling—silly, little-kid stuff, you know? ... They might have accepted a ride with someone they knew to get warm. Either that, or someone forced them into a car."

— Rosemary Chodor, friend of Theresa Grimes, recollecting the two sisters' personalities

== Aftermath ==
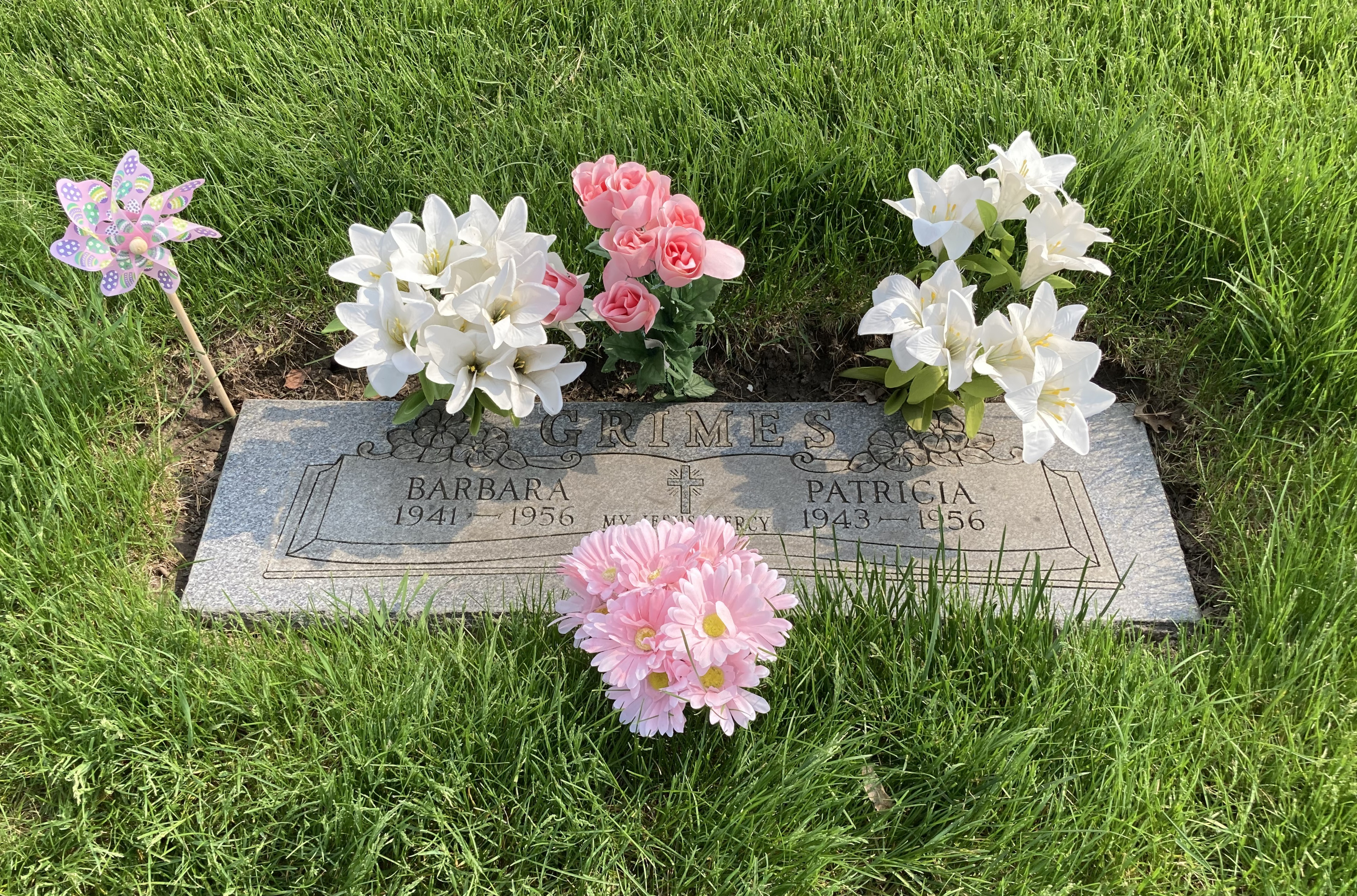
The Grimes sisters' graves at Holy Sepulchre Cemetery

In the weeks between the disappearance and discovery of her daughters' bodies, Lorretta Grimes was unable to work and thus earn money to raise her children and pay the mortgage on her home. Friends and neighbors of the Grimes family, including classmates and teachers of the sisters, organized various initiatives to raise funds for the family. Additional funds were raised via the local press and council, with donations through these methods ranging from 50 cents to $500. The funds enabled the Grimes family to pay the remaining mortgage on their home and bury Barbara and Patricia's bodies.

Following a wake held in the girls' memory on January 25, and a Holy Mass conducted at St. Maurice Church, Barbara and Patricia Grimes were laid to rest at the Holy Sepulchre Cemetery in Alsip, Illinois, on January 28. All fees for the service were waived by the Wollschlager Funeral Home, and the sisters are buried side by side. Among those to serve as pallbearers at this service were classmates of Barbara's.

In May 1957, Lorretta Grimes received an anonymous telephone call from an individual who claimed to have undressed and killed her daughters. Although the Grimes family had received numerous hoax phone calls following the girls' disappearance, this particular caller, having ridiculed police efforts to affix blame upon suspects such as Edward Bedwell, ended his phone call with information indicating he may indeed have been the perpetrator: "I know something about your little girl that no one else knows, not even the police. The smallest girl's toes were crossed at the feet!" This caller then laughed before terminating the call.

One year after the murder of her daughters, Lorretta Grimes publicly stated her conviction her daughters had been murdered by an individual they had known, stating that although the weather had been bitterly cold on the night of their abduction, Barbara and Patricia would never have entered a vehicle driven by an individual unknown to them, regardless of any discomfort.

Joseph Lohman, the Cook County Sheriff who strongly believed the Grimes sisters had been beaten, tortured and murdered by a sexual predator who had lured them into a vehicle on the evening of their disappearance, died of natural causes in 1969. At the time of his death, Lohman was the Dean of the School of Criminology in Berkeley.

On the 18th anniversary of the disappearance of the Grimes sisters, Ernest Spiotto, the sole detective who had been involved in the investigation of the girls' murders from the very beginning and who remained assigned to the investigation, again announced to the media the police had no credible suspects in the case. Officially, the murders of the Grimes sisters remain unsolved, although this is an open case.

The Grimes sisters' younger brother, James Grimes, who was just 11 at the time of his sisters' murder, stated in 2013 that he welcomed what he saw as a public "reopening of the case," stating: "I just assumed it was never going to be solved. [But] maybe there's hope."

=== Unofficial investigation ===
In 2013, retired West Chicago police officer Raymond Johnson began a personal investigation into the case. Johnson—considered by many to be an expert on this case—had become interested in the Grimes sisters' case in 2010, when he had been researching a book he had been writing about the city's history. Having extensively researched the case, Johnson has stated his conviction that the case is still a solvable one, but only with public assistance, and that the perpetrator was a 23-year-old self-confessed child killer named Charles LeRoy Melquist, who had been considered a suspect in the sisters' abduction and murder in 1957.

Melquist had been convicted of the September 1958 murder of a 15-year-old girl named Bonnie Leigh Scott, whom he had known prior to her murder, and whose decapitated body had been found two months after her disappearance less than 10 miles from where the Grimes sisters' bodies had been discovered. Following the discovery of Scott's body, investigators noted similarities in this murder and body disposal and that of the Grimes sisters. Melquist was never questioned as to his potential culpability in the Grimes sisters' murders, as his attorney had forbidden him to be subject to questioning.

The day after the body of Bonnie Leigh Scott was discovered, Lorretta Grimes received a phone call from an individual who, on this occasion, claimed responsibility for Scott's murder. On this occasion, the caller had stated: "I've committed another perfect crime ... This is another one those cops won't solve and they're not going [to affix blame onto] Bedwell or Barry Cook." (Note: Cook was a criminal incarcerated at the Joliet Correctional Center who had admitted, then denied, his involvement in two murders dating from 1957.) Lorretta Grimes remained adamant until her death this caller was the same individual who contacted her in May 1957 and revealed the deformity on one of her daughters' feet which had never been released to the press or the public, stating: "I will never forget that voice."

Charles Melquist was never charged with his alleged involvement in the deaths of the Grimes sisters. He died in 2010.

== See also ==
- List of homicides in Illinois
- List of kidnappings (1950–1959)
- List of murdered American children
- List of solved missing person cases (1950–1969)
- List of unsolved murders (1900–1979)

== Cited works and further reading ==
- Bailey, Frankie Y. Ph. D; Chermak, Steven (2016). Crimes of the Centuries: Notorious Crimes, Criminals, and Criminal Trials in American History. Santa Barbara: ABC-CLIO. pp. 325–326. ISBN 978-1-610-69593-0.
- Bielski, Ursula (1998). Chicago Haunts: Ghostlore of the Windy City. Chicago: Lake Claremont Press. ISBN 0-96424-269-9.
- Dunning, John (1992). Mindless Murders. Great Britain: Mulberry Editions. ISBN 1-873-12333-7.
- Johnson, Raymond (2014). Chicago History: The Stranger Side. Atglen, Pennsylvania: Schiffer Publishing, Ltd. ISBN 978-0-764-34509-8.
- Lindberg, Richard C.; Sykes, Gloria Jean (2016). Shattered Sense of Innocence: The 1955 Murders of Three Chicago Children. Carbondale, Illinois: Southern Illinois University Press. ISBN 978-0-764-34509-8.
- Nash, Jay Robert (1983). Open Files: A Narrative Encyclopedia of the World's Greatest Unsolved Crimes. Maryland: M. Evans. pp. 100–101. ISBN 978-0-070-45907-6.
- Newton, Michael (2009). The Encyclopedia of Unsolved Crimes. New York: Facts on File. pp. 76–77. ISBN 978-0-816-07818-9.
- Shaffer, Tamara (2006). Murder Gone Cold: The Mystery of the Grimes Sisters. Oak Lawn, Illinois: Ghost Research Society Press. ISBN 0-9766072-7-1.
- Taylor, Troy (2015). The Two Lost Girls: The Mystery of the Grimes Sisters. Canada: Whitechapel Productions. ISBN 978-1-892-52398-3.
- Taylor, Troy (2009). True Crime: Illinois: The State's Most Notorious Criminal Cases. Pennsylvania: Stackpole Books. ISBN 978-0-811-73562-9.
- Thompson, Emily G. (2018). Unsolved Child Murders: Eighteen American Cases, 1956–1998. North Carolina: McFarland & Company Inc. ISBN 978-1-476-67000-3.
