= List of kidnappings (1950–1959) =

The following is a list of kidnappings that occurred between 1950 and 1959, summarizing the events of each case, including instances of celebrity abductions, claimed hoaxes, suspected kidnappings, extradition abductions, and mass kidnappings.

== List ==
Date	Image	Victim(s)	Abductor(s)	Location	Age of victim(s)	Outcome	Notes
1950–		South Koreans abducted by North Koreans	Agents and soldiers	South Korea	Various	Various	Approximately 84,532 South Koreans were taken to North Korea during the Korean War. Since the war's armistice in 1953, about 3,800 people have been abducted.
30 October 1950		Thomas Flynn	Hukbalahap communist rebels	Philippines	41	Murdered	An Irish missionary priest killed by Hukbalahap communist rebels; his remains were exhumed and interred in the family plot in County Clare in 2003.
30 December 1950		Lee Archer	Billy Cook	(United States) Lubbock, Texas, U.S.	52	Escaped	Archer was a mechanic who was kidnapped and robbed by career criminal Billy Cook; he was placed in the trunk of his own car at gunpoint, but escaped by prising open the trunk with a tire iron.
2 January 1951		Carl Mosser	Billy Cook	United States	33	Murdered	Five members of the Mosser family were kidnapped and murdered by Billy Cook.
2 January 1951		Thelma Mosser	Billy Cook	United States	29	Murdered	Five members of the Mosser family were kidnapped and murdered by Billy Cook.
2 January 1951		Ronald Mosser	Billy Cook	United States	7	Murdered	Five members of the Mosser family were kidnapped and murdered by Billy Cook.
2 January 1951		Gary Mosser	Billy Cook	United States	5	Murdered	Five members of the Mosser family were kidnapped and murdered by Billy Cook.
2 January 1951		Pamela Mosser	Billy Cook	United States	2	Murdered	Five members of the Mosser family were kidnapped and murdered by Billy Cook.
6 January 1951		Robert Dewey	Billy Cook	(United States) Imperial County, California, U.S.	32	Murdered	Dewey was a travelling salesman abducted and murdered by spree killer Billy Cook. He was shot to death in a desert close to Blythe, California, and his body discovered in an abandoned car near Ogilby, California, the day after his murder.
21 February 1951		Luis Albino	Unknown	(United States) Oakland, California, U.S.	6	Found alive in 2024	Albino was playing at a park with his older brother when a woman approached them and offered him candy to go with her. In 2024, he was found to be alive and living in the East Coast after his niece took an at-home DNA test.
24 August 1951		Beverly Potts	Unknown	(United States) Cleveland, Ohio, U.S.	10	Unknown	Beverly Potts was kidnapped and never heard from again.
8 July 1952		Walter Linse	Stasi	East Germany	49	Executed	A German lawyer for the Free German Jurists, an organization with links to the CIA, was kidnapped by the Stasi and held in Hohenschönhausen prison, before being handed over to the KGB who executed him at the Butyrka prison in Moscow on 15 December 1953.
9 August 1952		Catherine Dalton	Unknown	(United States) Kentucky, U.S.	10	Released	Two sisters who disappeared while running a family errand in 1952; both returned unexpectedly in 1963, claiming to have been abducted and forced into domestic servitude in an isolated rural house by a man they knew only as Thomas. According to both sisters, this individual had abruptly informed them to leave his house shortly before heir discovery aside a Harlan, Kentucky roadside in September 1963. Although some individuals have doubted the truth of the sisters' claims regarding their captivity and release, both remained adamant as to the authenticity of their ordeal until their deaths in the 2000s.
9 August 1952		Margaret Dalton	Unknown	(United States) Kentucky, U.S.	14	Released	
October 1952		Betty Alexander	Unknown	Glasgow, Scotland, U.K.	4	Murdered	Alexander was kidnapped and murdered in Glasgow.
11 June 1953		Clem Graver	Two unidentified men who drove a black sedan	(United States) Chicago, Illinois, U.S.	53	Unknown	Celinus "Clem" Graver was an American politician who was kidnapped on 11 June 1953, form his home in Illinois and was never seen again.
28 September 1953		Robert "Bobby" Cosgrove Greenlease Jr.	Bonnie Heady and Carl A. Hall	(United States) Kansas City, Missouri, U.S.	6	Murdered	Greenlease was kidnapped and immediately murdered. The murderers demanded and were paid a $600,000 ransom by the boy's father, a wealthy automobile dealer. Over half of the ransom money was stolen by a corrupt police officer and never recovered.
24 October 1953		Evelyn Hartley	Unknown	(United States) La Crosse County, Wisconsin, U.S.	14	Unknown	An American teenager who mysteriously disappeared on October 24, 1953, from La Crosse County, Wisconsin, and was never found.
December 1954		Unidentified 11-year-old girl	John A. Bennett	Wals-Siezenheim, Austria	11	Survived	Bennett, a U.S. soldier stationed in Salzburg, abducted an 11-year-old girl while heavily intoxicated and looking for a brothel and raped her before strangling her and throwing her into a stream. She survived the assault and Bennett was sentenced to death by a court-martial.
15 June 1955		Curtis Chillingworth	Floyd Holzapfel, Bobby Lincoln, Joseph Peel	(United States) Manalapan, Florida, U.S.	58	Murdered	Circuit court judge Curtis Chillingworth and his wife Marjorie were abducted from their home by Floyd Holzapfel and Bobby Lincoln, who later testified that they had thrown them into the sea with lead weights tied to their feet on orders from Joseph Peel, a municipal judge who Curtis Chillingworth was investigating for corruption.
15 June 1955		Marjorie Chillingworth	Floyd Holzapfel, Bobby Lincoln, Joseph Peel	(United States) Manalapan, Florida, U.S.	47	Murdered	Circuit court judge Curtis Chillingworth and his wife Marjorie were abducted from their home by Floyd Holzapfel and Bobby Lincoln, who later testified that they had thrown them into the sea with lead weights tied to their feet on orders from Joseph Peel, a municipal judge who Curtis Chillingworth was investigating for corruption.
28 August 1955		Emmett Till	Roy Bryant, J.W. Milam	(United States) Drew, Mississippi, U.S.	14	Murdered	Till, an African-American teenager from Chicago, was abducted from his great-uncle's home by two white men, Roy Bryant and his half-brother J.W. Milam, after Bryant's wife, Carolyn, accused Till of harassing her. Milam and Bryant beat and tortured Till, possibly with help from accomplices, before shooting him in the head and sinking his body into the Tallahatchie River.
4 September 1955		Yumiko Nagayama	Isaac J. Hurt	Kadena, Okinawa, Japan	5	Murdered	A five-year-old Japanese child raped and murdered by U.S. soldier Isaac J. Hurt. Although initially sentenced to death, Hurt's sentence was later commuted to life imprisonment without the possibility of parole. He was released from prison in 1977.
4 July 1956		Peter Weinberger	Angelo LaMarca	(United States) Westbury, New York, U.S.	1 month	Murdered	LaMarca took the baby from his home for a $2,000 ransom. He told investigators he went to the first drop site the day after the kidnapping with the baby in the car, but was scared away by press and police in the area. He drove off, abandoned the baby alive in heavy brush near a highway exit, and went home. A search of the area by Federal Bureau of Investigation (FBI) agents and Nassau County Police Department ensued. An FBI agent spotted a diaper pin, then the decomposed remains of Peter Weinberger. The Weinberger case also resulted in new legislation, signed by President Dwight D. Eisenhower, which reduced the FBI's waiting period in kidnapping cases from 7 days to 24 hours. LaMarca was executed via electric chair on 7 August 1958.
6 January 1956		Susan Cadieux	Unknown	London, Ontario, Canada	5	Murdered	Five-year-old Susan Cadieux was playing outside St. Mary's School in London, Ontario, with her two brothers and a friend when a man approached the group and kidnapped her. She was later found murdered and the perpetrator was never found.
28 December 1956		Barbara Grimes	Unknown	(United States) Chicago, Illinois, U.S.	15	Murdered	The Grimes sisters were taken while returning home from the cinema after a screening of Love Me Tender. Their bodies were found the following January. Although an autopsy found they were killed five hours after they disappeared, numerous witnesses attested to seeing or contacting the girls long after their supposed deaths. The perpetrator remains unidentified.
28 December 1956		Patricia Grimes	Unknown	(United States) Chicago, Illinois, U.S.	12	Murdered	The Grimes sisters were taken while returning home from the cinema after a screening of Love Me Tender. Their bodies were found the following January. Although an autopsy found they were killed five hours after they disappeared, numerous witnesses attested to seeing or contacting the girls long after their supposed deaths. The perpetrator remains unidentified.
2 September 1957		Judge Edward Aaron	Ku Klux Klan members	(United States) Birmingham, Alabama, U.S.	34	Rescued	African-American handyman who was abducted, beaten and tortured by seven KKK members who left him for dead. Aaron was rescued the same day, and several of his attackers were later convicted. His case inspired the 1988 film Mississippi Burning.
3 December 1957		Maria Ridulph	Unknown	(United States) Sycamore, Illinois, U.S.	7	Murdered	Maria Ridulph was abducted by a man calling himself "Johnny" while playing with her friend Kathy Sigman in December 1957. Her skeletal remains were found in Woodbine in April of the following year. Jack McCullough, a known sex offender living in the area, was convicted of the murder in 2012 but exonerated four years later when it was proven that he was in Rockford when the crime took place. The true perpetrator was never found.
23 February 1958		Juan Manuel Fangio	Rebels involved in the Cuban Revolution	Havana, Cuba	46	Released	The night before the non-championship Cuban Grand Prix, five-time Argentine Formula One champion Fangio was kidnapped by rebels involved in the Cuban Revolution. The abduction was planned by one of Fidel Castro's right-hand men, Faustino Perez, from a hotel in Havana. The abductors had also planned to kidnap fellow driver Stirling Moss, but Fangio had convinced the abductors not to. He was taken to three separate houses, and was offered various amnesties, including a radio to listen to the race. At midnight after the race, Fangio was dropped off at the Argentinian ambassador's home.
November 1958		Olga Duncan	Elizabeth Ann Duncan	(United States) California, U.S.	30	Murdered	Olga Duncan was kidnapped and murdered by her mother-in-law Elizabeth Ann Duncan.
24 April 1959		Mack Charles Parker	A lynch mob	(United States) Poplarville, Mississippi, U.S.	22	Murdered	Parker, a black man, was accused of raping a pregnant white woman named June Walters. Two days before his trial was set to begin, a mob of white locals stormed the jail and dragged Parker out before taking him up to the Pearl River Bridge on the Mississippi-Louisiana border, where he was shot and thrown in the river. His body was found in the river on 4 May.
2 May 1959		Betty Jean Owens	William Collinsworth, Patrick Scarborough, and David Beagles, along with Ollie Stoutamire	(United States) Tallahassee, Florida, U.S.	19	Rescued	An African American woman who was kidnapped and gang raped by three white men and a 16-year-old white boy in Tallahassee, Florida in 1959.
18 October 1959		Unnamed 8-year-old girl	Ronald Lee Wolfe	United States	8	Released	Lured into a vehicle and sexually assaulted by career criminal and sex offender Ronald Lee Wolfe; the child was released close to a farmhouse in Troy, Missouri. Wolfe was arrested shortly thereafter. He was executed for the crime in 1964; he was the last person executed in the United States for non-homicidal rape.
