= Stephen Cusack =

Stephen Cusack may refer to:

- Stephen A. Cusack, British molecular biologist
- Steve Cusack (1876–1952), American Major League Baseball umpire
