= Kelly High School =

Kelly High School may refer to:

- Monsignor Kelly Catholic High School (Beaumont, TX)
- Thomas Kelly High School (Chicago, IL)
- Kelly High School (Missouri) (Benton, MO)
