= List of kidnappings (1950–1969) =

List of kidnappings (1950–1969) has been divided into:

- List of kidnappings (1950–1959)
- List of kidnappings (1960–1969)
