= Walter Linse =

- Born: August 23, 1903; Germany
- Died: December 15, 1953 (aged 50); Butyrka Prison, Moscow, Soviet Union
- Occupation: Lawyer
- Known for: Kidnapping by the Stasi; postwar human rights investigations; namesake of the International Commission of Jurists

Walter Linse (23 August 1903 – 15 December 1953) was a German lawyer and Acting President of the Association of Free German Jurists, an organization with links to the CIA.

During the Nazi reign he was responsible for Aryanization of Jewish property in the district of Chemnitz.

In the early 1950s he was actively involved in uncovering human rights violations in the Soviet occupation zone such as arbitrary arrests, secret trials, and detention in labor camps. On 8 July 1952, he was kidnapped by the East German Ministry for State Security Stasi held in Hohenschönhausen prison, then handed over to the KGB and eventually executed in the Butyrka prison in Moscow.

According to a Life Magazine article dated 28 July 1952, Linse was kidnapped from outside his home on Gerichtsstraße American occupation zone of Berlin where at around 7.30am he was assaulted and bundled into a car. The kidnapping was conducted by four men. A woman who witnessed the event cried out for help and a lorry (truck) driver gave chase. The kidnappers in the car fired shots at the lorry (truck) with a pistol and dropped caltrops to deter the chase, and the car escaped into the Soviet occupation zone of Berlin with a vehicle barrier being raised to help speed the escape. (It needs to be remembered that the Berlin Wall was not constructed until 1961, so travel between the zones was still relatively unhindered at this time.)

The Life article claimed to quote part of a response to the kidnapping from Neues Deutschland, a communist supported paper, translated in Life as "Linse....got lost. Not a single agent of war-mongering imperialism will be safe, wherever he hangs out – be it West Berlin, Bonn, Paris or even Washington."

A West German police press statement, made on 13 July, identified and named four male kidnappers and 13 other accomplices who were involved in the kidnap. The police stated that all those involved were in the employ of the East German Ministry for State Security, also known as the Stasi.

After Linse's death, the International Commission of Jurists was set up in his memory. It is now a significant human rights non-governmental organization specializing in supporting the rule of law across the world.

== See also ==
- List of kidnappings (1950–1959)
