= Vincent LaMarca =

American police detective

Vincent LaMarca is an American former police detective in Long Beach, New York. His story was adapted to the 2002 film City by the Sea, in which he was portrayed by Robert De Niro.

When Vincent was 11, his father, Angelo LaMarca, was executed for the murder of Peter Weinberger, the result of a botched kidnapping; Angelo had stolen Weinberger from a bassinet on the porch of the baby's home, panicked, and ditched the child near a freeway exit where he died of suffocation in a honeysuckle patch.

His family was 'adopted' by the local police department, and LaMarca eventually ended up joining the same police force that had captured and helped in the prosecution of his father.

In 1990, his son, Joey (who he had not seen in years), murdered a drug dealer, James Winston, whom he was trying to rob, later claiming that murder was in his genes.
