= Joe Young (defensive end) =

American football player (1933–2019)

No. 65
- Position: Defensive end

Personal information
- Born: August 3, 1933; Chicago, Illinois, U.S.
- Died: February 27, 2019 (aged 85); Sun City, Menifee, California, U.S.
- Listed height: 6 ft 3 in (1.91 m)
- Listed weight: 245 lb (111 kg)

Career information
- High school: Kelly (Chicago)
- College: Marquette (1950-1951); Arizona (1956-1957)
- NFL draft: 1955: 24th round, 287th overall pick

Career history
- Denver Broncos (1960–1961)

Career AFL statistics
- Sacks: 2
- Stats at Pro Football Reference

Joe Young (August 3, 1933 - February 27, 2019) was an American football defensive end in the early American Football League. He played professionally for the Denver Broncos during the 1960s.

== Early life ==
Young was born in Chicago, Illinois and attended Thomas Kelly High School in Chicago. He played college football at Marquette University and the University of Arizona. He was named to the All-Border Conference in 1957.

== Career ==
Young was drafted in the twenty-fourth round (287th pick overall) by the Chicago Bears in the 1955 NFL draft. He played two seasons with the Denver Broncos of the American Football League in 1960 and 1961.

== Later life ==
Young died on February 27, 2019, at the age of 85, and was interred at Riverside National Cemetery.
