= Frank Gulotta =

American judge

Frank A. Gulotta (June 4, 1907 – December 10, 1989) was a New York Supreme Court, Appellate Division judge, and a Nassau County district attorney.

== Biography ==
Gulotta was born in Brooklyn, New York in 1907 to Italian immigrant parents. He graduated from Newtown High School in Queens. He graduated from St. John's University Law School, and was admitted to the bar in 1932. He entered government service as Lynbrook village counsel and a zoning board member in the late 1930s.

A Major in the U.S. Army during World War II, he won three battle stars for service in Africa and Italy. He was also an assistant district attorney from 1938–1949, when Gov. Thomas E. Dewey appointed him district attorney for Nassau County.

In 1956, in the biggest case of his career, Gulotta prosecuted Angelo LaMarca in the kidnap-murder of 33-day-old Peter Weinberger; LaMarca was executed. Gulotta held the district attorney office until 1958, when he was first elected to the state's Supreme Court. He joined the Appellate Division in 1971 and retired in 1977. He was a senior associate justice until 1983.

== Death ==
Gulotta died from complications of diabetes at Franklin Hospital Medical Center in Valley Stream, New York on December 10, 1989, aged 82. He was survived by his wife, a brother, 3 children and 6 grandchildren.

== Children ==
One of his sons, Thomas, was the Republican county executive of Nassau County, New York from 1987 to 2001. Another, Frank Gulotta, Jr. was a Nassau County judge as of 2006.
