= Murder of Peter Weinberger =

1956 abduction and murder

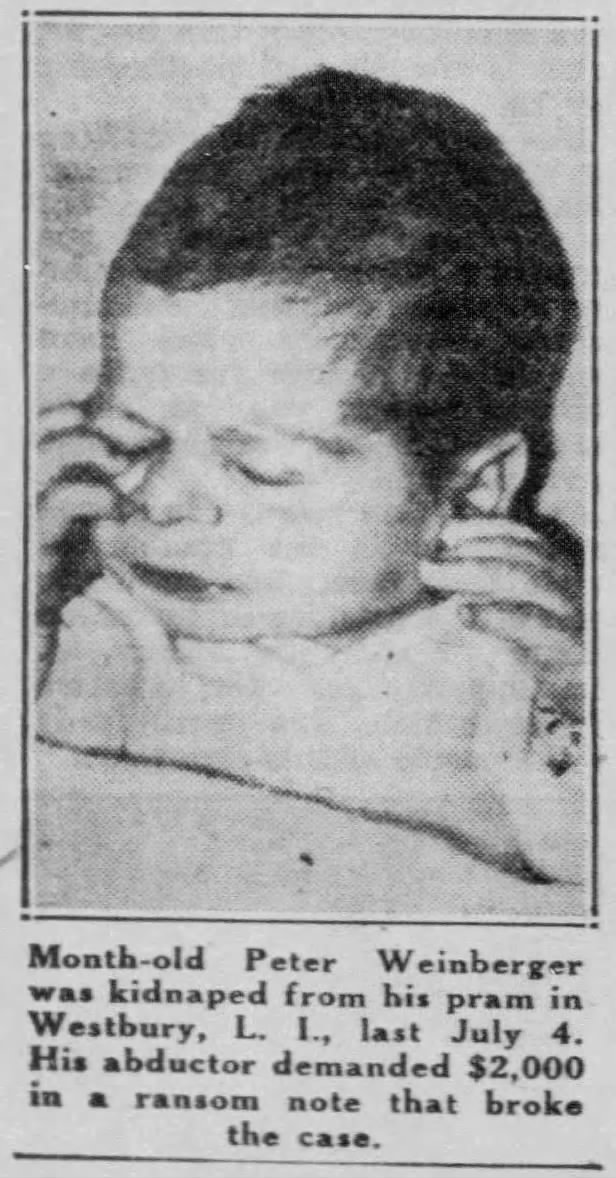
- Victim Peter Weinberger
- Location: Westbury, New York, U.S.
- Date: Abduction: July 4, 1956; Abandonment: July 5, 1956; Death: c. July 12, 1956; Discovery of remains: August 24, 1956
- Attack type: Child murder by suffocation, (Note: Contributing factors of starvation and exposure.) infanticide, child abduction
- Victims: Peter Weinberger, aged 1 month
- Perpetrator: Angelo John LaMarca
- Motive: Ransom to pay off personal debt
- Verdict: Guilty on both counts
- Convictions: First-degree murder, kidnapping
- Sentence: Death

Peter Weinberger (June 2, 1956 – c. July 12, 1956) was a one-month-old infant who was kidnapped for ransom on July 4, 1956, in New York state. The case gained national notoriety due to the circumstances of the kidnapping and the victim's family, as unlike many victims in kidnappings for ransom, Weinberger was not from a wealthy and prominent family, but from a suburban middle class family.

As was required by law at the time, the Federal Bureau of Investigation (FBI) waited for seven days before they had the jurisdiction to involve themselves in the investigation. The investigation took approximately six weeks, during which state and federal authorities reviewed millions of documents and public records in their attempt to locate the identity of Weinberger's kidnapper. The investigation led to the arrest of then-31-year-old Angelo John LaMarca, who eventually confessed to kidnapping and abandoning Peter Weinberger due to mounting debts and financial difficulties. While LaMarca claimed to have abandoned Weinberger alive, investigators found Weinberger dead from asphyxia, with starvation and exposure being contributing factors.

During his highly publicized trial in Nassau County, New York, LaMarca attempted to attribute the murder to a state of temporary insanity caused by stress around his financial problems. He was convicted of first-degree murder and kidnapping and sentenced to death. After spending over eighteen months on death row, LaMarca was executed in Sing Sing Prison's electric chair in 1958.

Subsequent to the case, President Dwight D. Eisenhower signed legislation to reduce the FBI's waiting period in kidnapping cases from 7 days to 24 hours.

== Perpetrator ==
Angelo LaMarca was born in New York on April 13, 1925. On July 31, 1943, he was drafted to serve in World War II; his enlistment papers state that he had "dependents" at that time but was single, that he worked in the manufacturing of "paper goods", and that the most advanced education level he attained was attendance at grammar school.

Angelo LaMarca married Donna LaMarca on June 6, 1946. They had two children together, a boy named Vincent and a girl named Vivian; at the time that LaMarca received his death sentence, Vincent was 9 years old, and Vivian was 5.

In 1954, LaMarca was arrested for his participation in a bootlegging operation that also involved his father, Vincenzo, and his younger brother, Joseph, as well as two other men who were not related to LaMarca. The group set up an illegal still capable of producing 500 gallons of bootleg whiskey. Following their arrests, all five were charged with operating a still and possessing mash, the latter of which was a federal offense. LaMarca received a 90-day suspended sentence along with a year of probation. The documents filed in relation to LaMarca's probationary period would play a significant role in his capture for the Weinberger kidnapping.

== Kidnapping of Peter Weinberger ==
Peter Weinberger was born on June 2, 1956. On July 4, when Peter was 32 days old, his mother, Betty Weinberger, placed him in a carriage covered with mosquito netting on the patio of their house at 17 Albemarle Rd. Westbury, New York, a town in Nassau County, and left him unattended for approximately 10 minutes. She returned to find that someone had pulled open the netting, taken Peter, and left a ransom note on notebook paper in green ink. The note read, in part:

Attention, I'm sorry this had to happen, but I am in bad need of money, & couldn't get it any other way. Don't tell anyone or go to the police about this, because I am watching you closely. I am scared stiff, & will kill the baby at your first wrong move. Just put $2000 in small bills in a brown envelope. . . . If everything goes smooth, I will bring the baby back leave him on the same corner "Safe Happy" at exactly 12 noon. No excuses, I can't wait! Your baby sitter. [ sic ]

The note demanded that the Weinbergers leave the money next to a signpost near their house by 10 a.m. the next morning. Betty Weinberger's husband Morris, a wholesale pharmacist, soon returned from a car ride with their older son, two-year-old Lewis, at which point the two called Nassau police. Shortly afterwards, Detective Frank Abramowicz arrived at the house. He informed his boss, Sergeant Edward Curran, of the kidnapping, at which point Abramowicz, Curran, and the Weinbergers agreed to pay the ransom as quickly as possible to ensure Peter's safe recovery. The Weinbergers were of a modest income and required the financial aid of several relatives to pay the ransom. On Independence Day, a federal holiday in the United States, area banks were closed, so the police had to arrange for a bank to open and release money specifically for the Weinberger case. Detectives subsequently attached recording devices to the Weinbergers' phones. Meanwhile, police requested that the local press refrain from reporting on the story for 24 hours to reduce the risk of the kidnapper harming Peter. Nevertheless, the New York Daily News reported on the kidnapping that same evening and drew copious amounts of attention to the event. The next morning, a swarm of reporters and photographers had descended upon the drop-off point, likely deterring the kidnapper from returning to retrieve the money.

== Investigation ==
On July 6, investigators staged a news conference to appeal to the kidnapper to feed the baby a supposedly medically recommended baby formula which theoretically required pharmacy preparation. In reality, a pharmacist could not fill out the formula, and detectives used it as a ruse to attract the kidnapper to a pharmacy, where a pharmacist would hopefully recognize the situation and alert the police. The kidnapper did not appear, and no pharmacists reported hearing from the kidnapper.

On July 10, the kidnapper called the Weinberger household; Morris picked up the phone. He claimed that the kidnapper had a male voice and instructed him to leave the ransom by a nearby highway. Although Morris left the ransom, the kidnapper did not retrieve it. Later that same day, the kidnapper called again, and Betty Weinberger answered. The kidnapper arranged a second meeting in another location, at which point detectives, who had recorded the phone call, staked out near the location of the second meeting. The kidnapper was not there, but he left a blue bag containing a note in which he repeated his demand for $2,000. The note contained the same handwriting as the first ransom note.

The Federal Bureau of Investigation (FBI) waited for one week, as required by law at the time, before they entered the investigation. Handwriting experts analyzed the two ransom notes and noted distinguishing characteristics in the writing. Meanwhile, the Weinbergers were subjected to numerous hoaxes with unrelated parties attempting to extort the ransom money from them, resulting in five people unrelated to the kidnapping being arrested. One hoax caller lured Betty Weinberger to a movie theater and used the opportunity to steal her purse.

== Apprehension and interrogation ==
On August 22, 1956, six weeks after the kidnapping and after the FBI had analyzed over 2 million public records in an attempt to find a handwriting match, a federal probation officer in Brooklyn, New York, found a document in his files with handwriting that matched the unique writing style of the ransom notes' author. The defendant in that case was then-31-year-old Angelo LaMarca, who had been convicted of bootlegging in Suffolk and had just completed his term of probation. After FBI handwriting experts concluded that LaMarca had written the ransom notes, Nassau County police planned the arrest in a way that was intended to avoid harm to Peter Weinberger if he were still alive. The next day, on August 23, police swarmed the homes of LaMarca and all of his close relatives. Police arrested LaMarca at his own house as he returned from dropping off his own two children at his parents' house.

At first, during questioning, LaMarca denied knowing anything about the kidnapping. When confronted with the evidence of his handwriting matching the ransom notes, LaMarca attempted to blame the kidnapping on an unknown third party, stating that he had written the notes in jest and that his friends must have taken them from a trash can to frame him for the kidnapping. After changing his story several times, LaMarca wrote a 12-page typewritten and signed confession. LaMarca admitted to having kidnapped Peter Weinberger at random after driving by and watching Weinberger's mother place the baby in a carriage on her patio. He confessed that on July 5, approximately 24 hours after the kidnapping, he had been scared by press coverage of the kidnapping and subsequently abandoned Peter Weinberger alive in a wooded area by the Northern State Parkway. When asked for a motive, LaMarca said that he was $1,800 in debt after buying a refrigerator and storm windows for his house and that he was behind on his car payments.

After writing his confession, LaMarca was arraigned on charges of kidnapping. Afterwards, he attempted to implicate a man named Joe Parisi as his accomplice in the kidnapping. After Parisi was arrested and brought into custody, LaMarca recanted his statement implicating Parisi, claiming that he only implicated Parisi to make life difficult for him. He then named a man named "Shorty" as his accomplice. Detectives were unable to find anyone matching LaMarca's description of his alleged accomplice.

With LaMarca's help, investigators searched the parkway near the exit where LaMarca claimed to have left Peter Weinberger. On the morning of August 24, officials located Peter Weinberger's decomposed body. The cause of death was determined to have been a combination of asphyxia, starvation, and exposure. Nassau County's medical examiner, Theodore Curphey, later testified during LaMarca's trial that Weinberger may have lived for about one week before dying, but that asphyxiation was Weinberger's primary cause of death; based on Weinberger's state of decomposition, it was difficult for Curphey to make many conclusions about Weinberger's death, but Curphey later testified at trial that he inferred based on the status of Weinberger's clothing that LaMarca may have placed Weinberger face-down when abandoning him.

== Trial ==
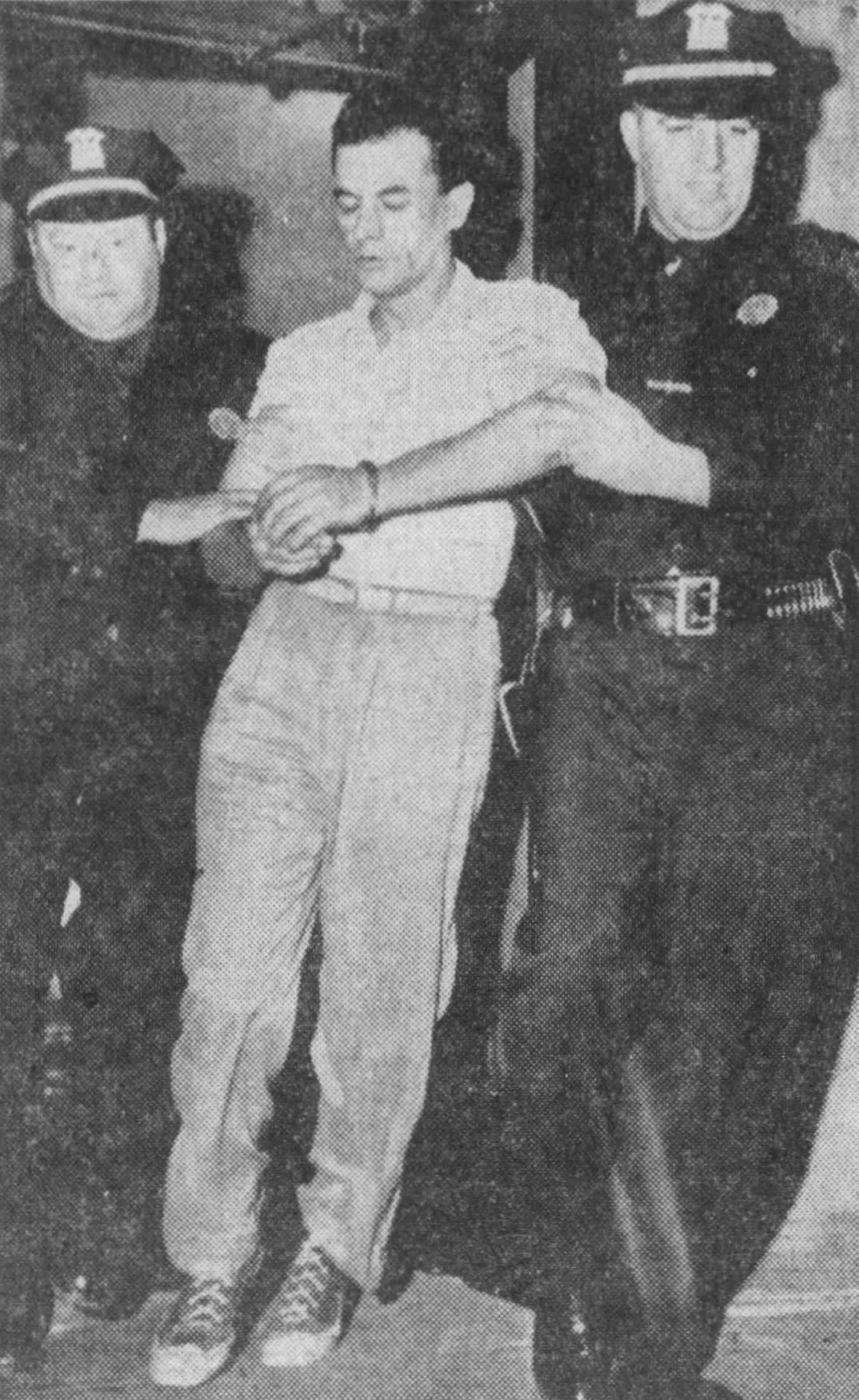
Angelo LaMarca being escorted out of court following his first-degree murder conviction

On August 29, 1956, LaMarca was indicted on charges of kidnapping and first-degree murder. A week later, on September 5, he pleaded not guilty by reason of insanity. On September 21, he motioned that the trial be moved out of Nassau County due to the pretrial publicity the case had received in the local press, but on October 1, the motion was denied; the trial ultimately took place in Nassau County.

LaMarca's trial began on November 5, 1956. In an unusual twist, Nassau County District Attorney Frank Gulotta decided to prosecute the case himself. Jury selection occurred during the first six days of the trial, wherein 230 jurors were questioned; 44 were excused due to lack of time, six were excused due to personal illness, 13 were excused because of their ideas and understanding on legal insanity, 20 were excused due to their acquaintance with people involved in the case, and 15 were excused for unspecified reasons. The jury was set on November 14, 1956. The jury consisted of twelve men, all of whom were fathers and two of whom were grandfathers. Shortly after his arrest, LaMarca's family hired attorneys George L. Marks and David M. Markowitz to defend him. The two remained on LaMarca's defense team throughout his trial.

LaMarca's defense at his trial was that he was driven to temporary insanity due to his mounting debts and that he was otherwise a normal, hardworking husband and father of two. His argument was that he was in an unbalanced state of mind when he formed the plan to kidnap Peter Weinberger. He also testified that, on the morning of the kidnapping, he had made several futile attempts to borrow necessary money from friends and family in order to afford necessities for his wife and kids and stall creditors. LaMarca testified in his own defense, admitting during his testimony that he alone had kidnapped Weinberger and in fact did not have any accomplices. Reporters who witnessed LaMarca's testimony remarked that he sounded "often hazy and uncertain" and gave confusing responses to some of his defense attorney's questions under direct examination. He also gave two different stories to explain Peter Weinberger's kidnapping, abandonment, and murder; under direct examination, LaMarca said he did not know how he could have kidnapped another child when he had two children of his own, and also stated that he was not certain if any of the explanations he provided for Weinberger's kidnapping were correct, that he could not remember "how many versions of the confession [he] gave the police," and that he "kept giving different stories each time the police made new suggestions to [him] as to what happened". LaMarca's wife Donna testified that she noticed a shift in his behavior after he purchased the $15,000 house at which he was arrested. She also testified that the couple had been experiencing financial troubles for some time before the crime and that the pressure unbalanced LaMarca. Either Angelo or Donna LaMarca offered testimony at his trial regarding two suicide attempts he had made, once at the age of 13 after his father beat him, and once after an argument with his wife. The defense's final witness was a psychiatrist, Dr. Thomas S. Cusack, who testified that LaMarca was insane both during the kidnapping and when he later abandoned Weinberger. In all, LaMarca, his wife Donna, and Dr. Cusack were the only witnesses for the defense.

Under cross-examination, Dr. Cusack conceded that LaMarca took precautions to avoid detection by using a paperclip to prevent leaving fingerprints on a ransom note, but that these precautions did not mean that LaMarca was sane during the commission of the crime. The prosecution called another psychiatrist, Dr. Ernani D'Angelo, to rebut Dr. Cusack's testimony and LaMarca's contention of insanity. Dr. D'Angelo testified that LaMarca was sane and aware of his actions, stating, "I base my opinion that the defendant knew right from wrong on the fact that the act itself was so planned, so executed and so covered up to escape detection that only a person who knew what he was doing every second and every inch of the way could have accomplished this act."

When LaMarca attempted to use his military service as mitigation, the prosecution proved that he had deliberately exaggerated his service in an attempt to appear more sympathetic. Army records proved that LaMarca had lied when he testified that he served 3.5 years. In reality, he had only served 2.5 years, not 3.5 years as he had testified. On February 17, 1944, he was court-martialed and convicted of being absent without leave from Camp Edwards for a six-day period. LaMarca had also lied about driving an ammunition supply truck near the front lines in France three days after D-Day. In fact, LaMarca's service records showed that he only reached England nearly two months after D-Day, on July 31, 1944. The prosecution also suggested that a scar on LaMarca's left leg, which he said he got from a shrapnel wound, was actually caused by a childhood accident, which LaMarca disputed on the stand.

The trial concluded in early December, with the jury reaching their verdict on December 7, after deliberating for 6 hours and 24 minutes. LaMarca was convicted of first degree murder and kidnapping. Under New York law at the time, a first degree murder conviction carried a mandatory death sentence. However, because LaMarca had been convicted of felony first degree murder rather than premeditated first degree murder, the jury had the option of recommending mercy, in which case he would instead face life in prison. LaMarca's lawyers pleaded with the jury to let him live since he had two young children of his own. The prosecution replied, "What mercy was shown baby Peter when he was left in that woods? What mercy did he show then?" Ultimately, the jury did not recommend mercy, meaning LaMarca would die in the state's electric chair. Upon hearing the verdict, LaMarca's wife and mother, who were in the gallery witnessing the trial, reportedly fainted. One week later, on December 14, 1956, LaMarca was formally sentenced to death, with Nassau County Judge Mario Pittoni scheduling his execution to take place during the week of January 28, 1957.

== Appeals and execution ==
Due to filing appeals, the execution of LaMarca's death sentence was postponed for over 18 months. The duration of LaMarca's stay in the Sing Sing death house was one year, seven months, and 24 days, approximately twice the duration of an average inmate condemned to death in the state at the time. In his final appeal before his execution, LaMarca argued that the jurors in his case were prejudiced against him. He also argued that the rejection of his motion to change venues resulted in an unfair trial. In rejecting his appeal, the U.S. Court of Appeals for the Second Circuit pointed out that the size of the jury pool in LaMarca's trial was unusually large, that the time that it took to conduct jury examinations showed the care that county officials put into ensuring that LaMarca would have a fair trial, and that there was no evidence to support the claim that LaMarca had not received a fair trial in Nassau County.

On August 6, 1958, one of LaMarca's attorneys, Nancy Carley, attempted to obtain a writ of habeas corpus to stay her client's execution, which was scheduled to take place the next day. Carley argued that Judge Mario Pittoni had refused to answer a question from the jury and had thus denied LaMarca a fair trial. During a 30-minute hearing, the Circuit Court ruled that the argument was invalid. Afterwards, Carley stated that no other legal action in the case was likely and that LaMarca's only chance of survival was if New York Governor W. Averell Harriman agreed to grant executive clemency. Attorney George Marks visited with Governor Harriman to appeal for clemency, but his appeal was unsuccessful. LaMarca's wife, Donna, also appealed to Governor Harriman by radio. LaMarca's second attorney, David Markowitz, stated that the intention behind making the radio appeal was "to try to contradict the feeling of antagonism that has been aroused against Angelo LaMarca. Maybe enough people will be moved to send telegrams to the governor asking him to save this man's life." Governor Harriman's office received 400-500 telegrams from people opposed to LaMarca's execution, but he refused to intervene. Until the end of LaMarca's life, Donna insisted that he was insane, stating to a reporter after making her radio appeal, "I just can't believe my husband will die. How can they send an insane man to the chair? No man who is a father can let another child die unless he was crazy."

Angelo LaMarca was executed at 11:00 p.m. on August 7, 1958, at Sing Sing. He was pronounced dead three minutes later. His last meal had consisted of fried chicken, French-fried potatoes, vegetables, ice cream, and coffee. Prison officials stated that he repeatedly shouted "Maybe they'll save me yet" in the hours leading up to his execution. Shortly before his execution, LaMarca said his final goodbye to his two children. "They got along fine", Donna LaMarca said. "He told them to do well in school and to take care of me. [The girl] is too young to understand, but [the boy] knows what's happening." At his execution, a silent but visibly frightened LaMarca was accompanied by a Catholic chaplain. He was not observed to have said anything in the death chamber except quiet muttered responses to the chaplain's prayers, and one comment to a guard placing a strap over his eyes and face: "What are you trying to do, choke me?" Otherwise, he made no final statement. There were 35 witnesses to his execution, one of whom was Edward Curran. Curran later recalled, "I didn't particularly want to be there, but Betty Weinberger and Frank Gulotta asked me to go, so I felt I had to do it."

== Aftermath ==
Prior to the Weinberger case, the laws concerning federal intervention in kidnapping cases had been shaped by the Lindbergh kidnapping by Richard Hauptmann, who, like LaMarca, was executed after being convicted of the kidnapping and murder of an infant. Hauptmann's case had inspired the Federal Kidnapping Act, which, after amendments made in 1934, decreed that if a kidnapping victim was still missing after seven days, the FBI were allowed to presume that the victim had been trafficked across state lines and could therefore intervene as federal authorities. As a direct result of Peter Weinberger's kidnapping and murder, the Federal Kidnapping Act was amended in 1956 to allow the FBI to enter a kidnapping investigation after just 24 hours had passed. Later, in 1998, the Protection of Children from Sexual Predators Act would allow the FBI to become involved in kidnapping investigations prior to 24 hours passing.

Angelo LaMarca's son, Vincent LaMarca, was 11 years old at the time of his father's execution. Vincent would later become a police detective. In an interview after retiring from the police force, Vincent would state, "It was actually tougher being a kid, 9, 10 or 11 years old. You're going to school with kids who see your father's name on the front page of the papers every day. Let's just say kids can be a little bit cruel." Vincent also stated that his father's predicament inspired him to become a police officer, stating in another interview, "It tore me apart when he did this horrible thing. But it taught me a lifelong lesson about responsibility. And I became a cop so that no one could ever say one single bad thing about me [and so I could] restore the family name."

Years later, in 1996, Vincent's son, Joey LaMarca, was implicated in a murder in Long Beach. After his arrest, Joey claimed that he was genetically predisposed to murder. The case, and Vincent's life as a whole, inspired the plot of the 2002 film City by the Sea.

== See also ==
- List of kidnappings (1950–1959)
- List of people executed in New York
- List of people executed in the United States in 1958
- List of solved missing person cases: 1950–1969
