= Clem Graver =

American politician

- Born: Celinus Graver
- Disappeared: June 11, 1953; Chicago, Illinois, U.S.
- Status: Missing for 73 years, 4 months and 14 days
- Other name: Clem
- Occupations: Politician, state representative
- Known for: Breaking with the bloc over what became called McCormick Place, and mysterious kidnapping and disappearance

Celinus "Clem" Graver was a politician in Illinois who was kidnapped on June 11, 1953, and was never found.

== Background ==
Graver was born on July 4, 1899, in Chicago, Illinois. He was one of 5 children, and had 3 sisters and a brother. His father worked in a tannery near Goose Island. He hailed from a lower-middle-class family and grew up around the Humboldt Park area. He attended Burr elementary school and later the Lane Tech College Prep High School.

He married Emily Pomazal on May 7, 1924. They had only one child, a son in 1925 named Norman.

Before holding political office, Graver held several jobs. During the 1920s, he worked as a taxicab driver. He served as a baliff for municipal judge Samuel Heller for 12 years. He also served as an investigator for the Illinois Attorney General.

Graver got into politics through his brother-in-law, Harry Hochstein, who was also a member of the Republican party. Hochstein later became a close associate of Al Capone.

In 1946, he was elected Republican committeeman for Chicago's 21st ward, located on the city's west side. He also served as a state representative who notably broke with the bloc over what became called McCormick Place..

== Disappearance and aftermath ==
Graver was kidnapped from the home he shared with his wife, Emily, at 976 W. 18th Place in Chicago. Prior to the kidnapping, Graver had just returned to Chicago by train from Springfield before attending a ward meeting in the evening. During the meeting, Graver called both his son and his wife, which was noted to be odd by other members of the meeting. He made plans to have lunch with his son the following day. Some theorize suggest that Graver had some notion that something was going to happen to him that evening.

Graver had just arrived home and was pulling his car into the garage. A black sedan then pulled up in front of the garage, trapping Graver there. Two men exited the sedan, pinned his arms behind his back, and threw him into the car. The men were described as being well-dressed. A man in a baseball cap was seen at the wheel while Graver was kidnapped. His wife and a friend, fellow Republican Walter Pikelis, watched the event from the porch of the home. Graver was never seen again.

The investigation into Graver's kidnapping was one of the largest in the area. Chicago Police formed the "Graver Squad" as a special unit to investigate his disappearance. This squad dissolved in 1958, 4 years after he went missing. Over 2,000 people were questioned, with 30 arrests being made. However, no suspects were ever charged in connection with the crime. Initially, police believed Graver was kidnapped for ransom, but no ransom demands were ever sent. In the latter stages of the investigation, police believed that Graver was killed the day he was kidnapped.

Several theories surrounded Graver's kidnapping. One of the more popular theories was that he was killed by the West Side Vito mob. Graver may have been kidnapped and killed in retaliation for tipping off federal law enforcement about their activities in the Midwest. Other theories include Graver fleeing to Cuba to escape his involvement in unlawful activities. It has been theorized that Graver's body was buried under the concrete of an underground parking garage on Michigan avenue, which was under construction at the time.

In 1960, two sisters named Jean and Shirley Zelenk reportedly came forward with new evidence. They were witnesses to the kidnapping and lived next door to the Graver household. They handed a gun in a leather holster allegedly belonging to Graver to the police. The sisters stated that they waited to come forward with the holster because they were afraid for their lives, and were repeatedly threatened after the kidnapping.

As of 2026, Graver's body has never been found and the case remains unsolved.

== See also ==
- List of kidnappings (1950–1969)
- List of people who disappeared mysteriously (1910–1970)
