= Kevin Hickey =

American baseball player (1956–2012)

- Hickey in 2003 with the Chicago White Sox
- Pitcher
- Born: February 25, 1956; Chicago, Illinois, U.S.
- Died: May 16, 2012 (aged 56); Chicago, Illinois, U.S.
- Batted: Left Threw: Left

MLB debut
- April 14, 1981, for the Chicago White Sox

Last MLB appearance
- July 6, 1991, for the Baltimore Orioles

MLB statistics
- Win–loss record: 9–14
- Earned run average: 3.91
- Strikeouts: 118
- Stats at Baseball Reference

Teams
- Chicago White Sox (1981–1983); Baltimore Orioles (1989–1991)

Kevin John Hickey (February 25, 1956 – May 16, 2012) was an American left-handed pitcher who spent six seasons in Major League Baseball (MLB) with the Chicago White Sox (1981–1983) and Baltimore Orioles (1989–1991). It was with the White Sox that he was a reliever with the American League (AL) West titlist in 1983 and a batting practice pitcher for the 2005 World Series Champions.

== Biography ==
Hickey's grave at Holy Sepulchre Cemetery

Hickey was born on February 25, 1956, in Chicago's South Side and was raised in the Brighton Park neighborhood. He attended St. Rita of Cascia High School on a basketball scholarship, but was expelled for excessive truancy. He completed his secondary education at Thomas Kelly High School.

In August 1978, Hickey attended an open tryout held by the White Sox at Chicago's McKinley Park. Hickey was recruited after a staffer saw him playing 16" softball for the Bobcats at Kelly Park. He was the only player out of 250 to receive a contract, signing a minor league deal for $500 a month.

Hickey was one of several former major league players to appear in the baseball film Major League II, which was released in 1994. In it, he played the role of "Schoup".

After Hickey's retirement as a player, he worked as a car salesman in Columbus, Ohio, for almost ten years. He then moved back to Chicago and in 2003, the White Sox hired him to be their batting practice pitcher. He continued to work in that capacity for the rest of his life. On April 5, 2012, he was found unresponsive in his hotel room in Arlington, Texas, where the White Sox opened their 2012 season against the Texas Rangers. Hickey died on May 16, 2012, aged 56, at Rush University Medical Center in Chicago as a result of an anoxic brain injury. He had 5 daughters and 10 grandchildren.

He was buried at Holy Sepulchre Cemetery in Alsip.

== Sources ==
- Career statistics from Baseball Reference · Baseball Reference (Minors) · Retrosheet · Baseball Almanac
- Source: Ex-Sox pitcher Hickey in coma - Chicago White Sox Blog - ESPN
