= Kidnapping of Luis Albino =

1951 child abduction in the United States

- Location: Oakland, California, U.S.
- Date: February 21, 1951; 75 years ago
- Target: Luis Armando Albino
- Attack type: Child abduction
- Deaths: None
- Injuries: None
- Victim: Luis Armando Albino
- Perpetrator: Unknown
- Rediscovered in 2024, reunited with family.

On February 21, 1951, six-year-old Luis Armando Albino was kidnapped in Oakland, California, United States. In 2024, it was discovered that he was alive and living on the U.S. East Coast; he subsequently reconnected with his siblings and other extended family.

== Background ==
Albino was born c. 1945 in Puerto Rico to Antonia Albino. He was one of six children. He and his family had moved to West Oakland from Puerto Rico the year prior to his kidnapping.

== Disappearance and investigation ==
On the day of his kidnapping, Albino had been playing at the park with his older brother, Roger, who was ten years old. While at the park near their home on Brush Street, the boys were approached by "a woman in her 30s," who began talking to the pair and promised Luis that if he came with her she would buy him candy. Luis went with the woman, and Roger followed the two for a time "before returning home to alert an adult to the strange encounter".

After Roger reported his brother's disappearance, Oakland police launched a search. They initially did not believe Roger's account, and theorized Luis "had accidentally wandered into the bay and drowned". The Coast Guard was dispatched to search the waters around Jack London Square, but turned up nothing. San Francisco Bay and several other bodies of water were also searched.

State and federal authorities uncovered no leads during their initial investigations. His mother, Antonia, continued to pressure authorities, and visited the police’s missing person bureau "almost daily at first, then weekly, then monthly, and eventually annually". She was often attended by a neighbor or one of her older children, as she did not speak English.

In 1966, the Albino family reinvigorated their search, as Luis would then have been 21 and therefore might be on records from military service exams. The family took multiple trips to Puerto Rico to search for Luis but found no leads.

In 2020, after one of Luis's nieces took a DNA test, she matched with an unknown man. Suspecting that the man could be her missing uncle, the niece attempted to reach out, but did not receive a response. She brought her theory to the Oakland Police Department in early 2024, and the FBI and California Department of Justice were later able to confirm that the unknown man was Luis Albino.

The investigation into Albino's kidnapping is still ongoing, as the questions of who his kidnapper was and the full details of the event remain unsolved.

== Life after 1951 ==
After abducting Albino from the park, his kidnapper brought him out of California and eventually to the East Coast. There, Albino was raised by a couple whom he believed were his biological parents. He worked as a firefighter and served two tours in Vietnam in the Marine Corps. He had both children and grandchildren by the time he was reunited with his birth family.

In June 2024, Luis flew back to California to reunite with his family, including his brother Roger, who died two months after the reunion. His mother had died in 2005.

== See also ==
- List of kidnappings (1950–1959)
- List of solved missing person cases: 1950–1999
