= Murder of Betty Alexander =

Unsolved murder in Scotland

Betty Alexander
- Born: Scotland, UK
- Disappeared: 7 October 1952 (age 4)
- Died: Glasgow, Scotland
- Body discovered: 10 October 1952
- Known for: being kidnapped and murdered
- Parents: James Alexander (father); Barbara Alexander (mother)

The murder of Betty Alexander was an unsolved child murder that occurred in Glasgow, Scotland, in October 1952. Alexander, a four-year-old girl, disappeared from her home in Garnethill on 7 October 1952. Her body was discovered three days later, on 10 October, in a backyard near the Royal Hospital for Sick Children in West Graham Street. Despite an extensive police investigation involving thousands of statements, no one was convicted of her murder.

== Disappearance ==
Betty Alexander lived with her family at 43 Buccleuch Street in the Garnethill area of Glasgow. On Tuesday, 7 October 1952, she was last seen playing outside her home at approximately 5:30 p.m. When she failed to return, her family became concerned and a search was organized.

Police officers searched the surrounding neighbourhood, including lanes, closes and disused air-raid shelters. The disappearance attracted considerable public attention. Photographs of Alexander were distributed throughout Glasgow, and members of the public assisted police in searching for her.

A witness reportedly told police that they had seen a man with a young girl in the neighbourhood around the time of her disappearance. This became one of several leads investigated by detectives.

== Discovery of body ==
On Friday, 10 October 1952, Alexander's body was discovered on steps near the rear entrance of the children's dispensary in West Graham Street, approximately 200 yards from her home.

Her death was treated as murder, and a major criminal investigation followed. The discovery shocked Glasgow, particularly because the location was relatively close to her family home and had been within the general area searched during the initial investigation.

== Investigation and aftermath ==
The investigation became one of the major police inquiries in Glasgow at the time. Detectives interviewed thousands of people and collected approximately 3,000 statements. Police also investigated reports of suspicious individuals and examined possible forensic evidence. A fragment of newspaper found on Alexander's clothing was investigated as a possible clue.

Detectives also examined fingerprints recovered from objects near the location where her body was discovered. Several men were questioned during the investigation, but no suspect was convicted. In November 1952, newspaper reports continued to describe the murder as unsolved. Alexander's murder continued to attract attention in the decades following her death.

== See also ==
- Garnethill
- List of kidnappings (1950–1959)
- List of solved missing person cases (1950–1969)
