= City by the Sea =

2002 American crime drama film

- Theatrical release poster
- Directed by: Michael Caton-Jones
- Written by: Ken Hixon
- Based on: "Mark of a Murderer"; 1997 Esquire article by Michael McAlary
- Produced by: Brad Grey; Elie Samaha; Michael Caton-Jones; Matthew Baer
- Starring: Robert De Niro; Frances McDormand; James Franco; Eliza Dushku; William Forsythe; George Dzundza
- Cinematography: Karl Walter Lindenlaub
- Edited by: Jim Clark
- Music by: John Murphy
- Production companies: Franchise Pictures; Brad Grey Pictures
- Distributed by: Warner Bros. Pictures
- Release date: September 6, 2002
- Running time: 104 minutes
- Country: United States
- Language: English
- Budget: $40 million
- Box office: $29,413,966

City by the Sea is a 2002 American crime drama film directed by Michael Caton-Jones, starring Robert De Niro, James Franco, Eliza Dushku, Frances McDormand, William Forsythe, and George Dzundza. It deals with the family problems of a wayward youth, and is set against a man trying to break free of his past. It is based on the story of Long Beach, New York, detective Vincent LaMarca.

== Plot ==
Vincent LaMarca is a veteran New York City Police Department detective. When Vincent was 8 years old, his father was executed for murder because a child whom his father (also a cop but desperate for money) had kidnapped for ransom died while in his care. Vincent feels guilty for his father's deed, and has tried to redeem himself; he works hard as a cop despite the stigma of being the son of a murderer. Although he used to live in Long Beach, Vincent now lives in New York City.

Vincent's son Joey La Marca still lives in Long Beach, but he is a homeless junkie. Vincent last saw Joey 14 years ago when Vincent walked out on his son and his son's mother, and went to live alone. He has told his current girlfriend Michelle that he has no children.

Vincent's son Joey is implicated in a drug-related killing in Long Beach. Vincent is unwilling to help his son, and Michelle cannot understand why.

Joey's girlfriend Gina is struggling to stay sober for the sake of her infant son Angelo; Joey is the father of the child. Gina pleads with Vincent to try to save Joey. Gina eventually abandons the child, leaving the toddler with Vincent.

Vincent's police partner Reg is sympathetic to Vincent's situation and is trying to help Vincent clear Joey of the drug-related killing. On the basis of a tip-off, Reg and another policeman are in Long Beach searching an abandoned and ruined casino where Joey is thought to sleep, to try to take Joey for questioning. During the search, Reg is shot and killed. The second cop assumes that Joey killed Reg, and is unaware that Reg was killed by the ruthless local drug enforcer Spyder.

Joey is now thought to be responsible for two murders, including killing a cop. A massive police search is launched to stop this "armed and dangerous cop-killer". It looks as if the police will probably shoot and kill Joey if they can locate him.

Vincent decides that he has to do whatever he can to save his estranged son, but also for the sake of his little grandson, so that his grandson can grow up with a mother and a father. Vincent decides that he cannot stay "disappeared" from his son's and grandson's life in the same way his own father disappeared from his life when he was a child. Vincent discovers proof that Spyder killed Reg.

After a difficult search, Vincent finds Spyder but is now confronted at gunpoint. When Joey arrives, he fatally shoots Spyder in self-defense. Joey still does not trust Vincent, and thinks that his father merely wants to arrest him; cop first, father second. Eventually, Vincent is able to persuade his son that he cares for him. When other police aim their firearms on them, Vincent uses his own body to block his son's body so that police cannot shoot Joey without shooting him first.

Joey is arrested without violence, and father and son exchange a small smile before he is taken into custody. Afterward, Vincent adopts Angelo.

== Cast ==
- Robert De Niro as Detective Vincent LaMarca
- Frances McDormand as Michelle
- James Franco as Joey LaMarca
- Eliza Dushku as Gina
- William Forsythe as "Spyder"
- George Dzundza as Detective Reg Duffy
- Patti LuPone as Maggie LaMarca
- Anson Mount as Detective Dave Simon
- John Doman as Captain Henderson
- Brian Tarantina as "Snake"
- Drena De Niro as Vanessa Hansen
- Nestor Serrano as Detective Rossi
- Michael P. Moran as Herb
- Michael Della Femina as Angelo LaMarca, Vincent's Father
- Dominick Angelo and Pasquale Enrico Cangro as Baby Angelo, Joey and Gina's Son

== Production ==
Filming took place in early 2001. The story is primarily set in Long Beach, New York, a beachfront city on the south shore of Long Island, for which the municipal motto is "Civitas ad Mare", Latin for "City by the Sea".

However, the on-location scenes in the film that supposedly show the town of Long Beach were actually shot in Asbury Park, New Jersey. The film features many aspects of a town that appears to be partially ruined, including scenes of a shabby boardwalk and an abandoned casino/arcade building. There is a disclaimer in the credits at the end of the film that explicitly states that the film was not shot in Long Beach.

Some other scenes in the film show New York City (including the World Trade Center; the shots were not edited after the September 11 attacks).

== Reception ==
City by the Sea received mixed reviews from critics. Rotten Tomatoes gave the film a 48% rating, based on reviews from 143 critics, with an average rating of 5.8/10. Its critics' consensus reads: "Even though the movie is well acted, it sinks under an abundance of melodrama and cliches." On Metacritic, it has a weighted average score of 50 out of 100, based on 34 critics, indicating "mixed or average" reviews. Audiences polled by CinemaScore gave the film an average grade of "B" on a scale of A+ to F.

== Notes ==
- "Mark of a murderer" by Mike McAlary, Esquire magazine, 1997
