= Kelly High School (Chicago) =

Location
- 4136 S. California Ave; Chicago, Illinois 60632; United States; 41.8181°N 87.6949°W

Information
- School type: Public, secondary
- Opened: 1928
- School district: Chicago Public Schools
- Principal: Raul Magdaleno
- Teaching staff: 125.00 (FTE)
- Grades: 9–12
- Gender: Coed
- Enrollment: 1,903 (2022-23)
- Student to teacher ratio: 15.22
- Campus type: Urban
- Colors: Green; White
- Athletics conference: Chicago Public League
- Team name: Trojans
- Accreditation: North Central Association of Colleges and Schools
- Website: kellyhighschool.org

Thomas Kelly College Preparatory High School is a public four-year high school located in the Brighton Park neighborhood on the southwest side of Chicago, Illinois, United States. The school is named for Irish nationalist Thomas J. Kelly. Kelly is the third largest Chicago public high school in terms of student population. Over 80% of students are Hispanic. The school's team name is Trojans. Opened in 1928, Kelly is a part of the Chicago Public Schools district.

== History ==
Kelly opened its doors as a junior high school on December 3, 1928, only serving grades six through ninth. On July 12, 1933, the Chicago Board of Education abolished all junior high schools in Chicago, and on September 17, 1933, for the 1933–34 school year; Kelly reopened as a senior high school.

== Demographics ==
In the 2022-2023 school year, there were 1,903 students enrolled at the school. 84% of students identified as Hispanic or Latino, 11% were Asian, 4% were black or African-American, and 2% were non-Hispanic white. The school has a student to teacher ratio of 15.2, and 94% of students are eligible for free or reduced price lunch.

== Athletics ==
Kelly competes in the Chicago Public League (CPL) and is a member of the Illinois High School Association (IHSA).

== Notable alumni ==
- Lenny Gomulka – Professional Polka Bandleader and Musician
- Kevin Hickey – Major League Pitcher for the Chicago White Sox and the Baltimore Orioles
- Ron Masak - American Actor
- John Joseph Ryba – former Wisconsin state representative (1993–2003)
- Joe Young – 1952, former American football defensive end in the early American Football League
- Grimes sisters –
