= Steve Cusack =

American baseball umpire (1876-1952)

- Born: Stephen Patrick Cusack; September 27, 1876; St. Louis, Missouri, U.S.
- Died: June 16, 1952 (aged 75); Chicago, Illinois, U.S.
- Resting place: Holy Sepulchre Catholic Cemetery
- Years active: 1909, 1914
- Employer(s): National League, Federal League
- Known for: Baseball Umpire

Stephen Patrick Cusack (September 27, 1876 – June 16, 1952), was an American professional umpire in Major League Baseball. He appeared in 51 games as a National League umpire in 1909, and an additional 141 games for the Federal League in 1914. In his 192 total games, he umpired 139 games in the field, and 53 games behind home plate. He had a total of nine ejections during his career.

== Umpiring career ==
Cusack began the 1909 season in the National League, but was in the New York State League by the end of the year. Cusack's brief stint in the National League was marked by an incident in which he was assaulted by an irate player and threatened by several others. In a May game, Cusack called Cincinnati catcher Frank Roth out on a play at home plate. Roth struck Cusack in the chest with both fists. Several of Roth's teammates, with baseball bats in hand, crowded around Cusack and made threats toward the umpire.

For 1910, Cusack joined the American Association. By 1911, Cusack was umpiring in the Illinois–Indiana–Iowa League. In 1914, Cusack signed on to umpire in the upstart Federal League. He was dismissed by the league following that season.

== Later life ==
After his retirement from baseball, Cusack entered law enforcement. He became a deputy U.S. marshal and once took custody of swindler Oscar Hartzell.

== Death ==
Cusack died in his hometown of Chicago at the age of 75, and is interred at Holy Sepulchre Catholic Cemetery in Worth, Illinois.
