= Billy Cook (criminal) =

American mass murderer (1928–1952)

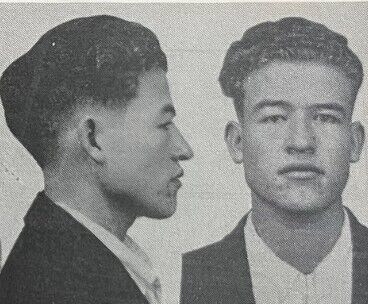
- Cook in 1946
- Born: William Edward Cook Jr. December 23, 1928; Joplin, Missouri, U.S.
- Died: December 12, 1952 (aged 23); San Quentin State Prison, San Quentin, California, U.S.
- Occupation: Drifter
- Status: Executed by gas chamber
- Motive: Robbery; Witness elimination
- Convictions: Federal; Kidnapping (5 counts); California; First degree murder
- Penalty: Federal; 300 years imprisonment California; Death

Details
- Date: December 30, 1950 – January 21, 1951
- Locations: Missouri and California
- Killed: 6
- Injured: 3
- Weapon: .32-caliber Colt 1903 semi-automatic pistol

William Edward Cook Jr. (December 23, 1928 – December 12, 1952) was an American spree killer and mass murderer who murdered six people, including a family of five, on a 22-day rampage between Missouri and California in 1950–51.

== Early life ==
William Edward Cook Jr. was born in Joplin, Missouri, in 1928, and had ten siblings. When he was five years old, his mother Laura May Cook (née Hinkle) died unexpectedly at the family home. He and his young sister Betty were the first to discover her body. A subsequent coroner's investigation headed by W. G. Hogan ruled cerebral hemorrhage as the cause of death, and noted that she had "apparently been in good health an hour before her body was found." Her obituary does not mention William Cook Sr.—her husband at the time—and William Cook Jr.'s father; no reason is given for this omission.

Soon after, William Cook Sr. relocated the children to an abandoned mine, eventually leaving them to fend for themselves with a few supplies. They were discovered there by the authorities and all the children were placed into foster care except William Cook Jr. A deformed eye and belligerent attitude stopped him being adopted by any family so he became a ward of the state. Cook was eventually placed in the care of a woman who accepted state money to look after him, but they had a poor relationship.

He soon drifted into petty crime and was eventually arrested for truancy. At the age of 12, he told a judge he would prefer a reformatory to more foster care. Cook spent several years in detention before he was transferred, aged 17, to the Missouri State Penitentiary. While in prison, he assaulted another inmate with a baseball bat.

When Cook was released from prison in 1950, he returned to Joplin and was briefly reunited with his father. He told him his intention was now to "live by the gun and roam". Cook then drifted to the small desert town of Blythe, California, where he worked as a dishwasher until just before Christmas 1950. In late December, he headed east again; on the way he acquired a .32-caliber Colt 1903 semi-automatic pistol (serial #39198) under the name “W. E. Cook, St. Louis” at the Boston Dry Goods Store in El Paso, Texas.

== Crimes ==
On December 30, 1950, Texan mechanic Lee Archer was driving his car near Lubbock, Texas when he picked up Billy Cook, who was hitchhiking. Shortly afterward, Cook robbed Archer of $100 at gunpoint and forced him into the trunk of his car. Later, Archer escaped by forcing open the trunk with a tire iron.

After the car ran out of fuel between Claremore and Tulsa, Oklahoma, Cook posed again as a hitchhiker. This time, he was picked up by farmer Carl Mosser from Illinois, who was en route to New Mexico with his wife Thelma, their three young children (Ronald Dean, Pamela Sue, and Gary Carl), and a dog. At gunpoint, Cook forced Mosser to drive around aimlessly for 72 hours. At one point, Mosser nearly overpowered Cook at a filling station near Wichita Falls, Texas, but Cook was too strong for him. Cook shot the entire family and their dog shortly afterward. He dumped their bodies in a mine shaft near his hometown of Joplin.

Cook headed back to California after abandoning the Mosser car in Oklahoma. The car was discovered full of bullet holes and covered in blood. The receipt for Cook's gun was found in it.

Just outside Blythe, Deputy Sheriff Homer Waldrip became suspicious of Cook and went to the motel where he had earlier lived with a friend. Hoping to question the friend, he was instead taken by surprise when Cook himself jumped from behind the door and took his revolver. Waldrip was taken hostage by Cook. As with the Mossers, Cook forced the deputy to drive around aimlessly. During this drive, Cook bragged about murdering the Mossers. After some 40 miles, Cook ordered the deputy to pull over and lie face down in a ditch, saying he would shoot him in the head; however, Cook instead got back into the police car and drove away.

Cook then kidnapped another motorist, Robert Dewey, from Seattle. Sometime later, the traveling salesman tried to wrestle the gun from Cook, but was wounded in the process. The car left the road and careened into the desert. Cook murdered Dewey with a shot to the head. Dewey's body was found in Waldrip's abandoned car near Ogilby, California; Cook abandoned Dewey's car in Mexicali, Mexico.

By this time, all law enforcement agencies throughout the U.S. Southwest were on the lookout for Cook, who had returned to Blythe. He kidnapped two other men, James Burke and Forrest Damron, who were on a hunting trip. He forced them to drive across the Mexican border to Santa Rosalía, where he was recognized by the local police chief, Luis Parra, who walked up to Cook, snatched the .32-caliber handgun from his belt, and arrested him. Since Mexico did not have an extradition policy with the United States at the time, a group of officers decided to physically push Cook across the border. He was immediately arrested.

Cook was found with a small arsenal after his arrest, which consisted of the .32-caliber Colt 1903 handgun, a .38-caliber Smith & Wesson Model 10 revolver & two bolt-action rifles (a .22-caliber Remington Model 34 & a .270 Winchester Model 54).

== Execution ==
Cook was returned to Oklahoma City to stand trial for the Mosser killings. Because he had taken them across state lines, the crime became a federal case under the Federal Kidnapping Act. To avoid a possible death sentence, Cook pleaded guilty to five counts of kidnapping. The guilty plea was permitted by the judge due to disputes over Cook's mental health. One psychiatrist thought he was sane and a psychopath, while another thought he was insane.

=== Sentencing ===
Cook was sentenced to 300 years in prison, 60 years for each count, to be served at Alcatraz Federal Penitentiary. U.S. District Judge Stephen S. Chandler said "I do not think it can be justifiably said that the defendant had sufficient mental capacity to commit a crime warranting the death penalty by a jury or this court." Outraged that Cook's life had been spared, U.S. Attorney Robert E. Shelton jumped to his feet and shouted "If there was ever a death penalty case in the history of the nation, this is a death penalty case. This boy's childhood is no justification for wiping out six people, an entire family, in coldblooded murder. I want the public and the court to know that I demand the death penalty in this case. If the court heard all the facts in this case, I think the court might reach a different opinion."

Chandler said he knew all of the facts and that he did not believe the case warranted execution. He mentioned Cook's upbringing, saying "Society stands indicted for permitting this child to grow up among cruel and inhuman conditions and must accept part of the blame. This crime might never have been committed had this boy been given a civilized upbringing and education." At this point, Shelton objected and talked about his own childhood. Getting emotional, he said "My mother died when I was five. I lived in a dugout and I'm no criminal. I want the public to know I demand the death penalty."

=== California murder trial ===
It was soon discovered that Cook's sentence carried the chance of parole after 20 years. This resulted in immense public pressure for him to stand trial for the murder he committed in California. In 1951, a California jury found Cook guilty of first degree murder for killing Robert Dewey. They did not make a recommendation for mercy, making a death sentence mandatory.

On December 12, 1952, Cook was executed in the gas chamber at San Quentin Prison. "I hate everybody's guts," he said at the time of his arrest, "and everybody hates mine." His last meal consisted of fried chicken, french fried potatoes, peas, pumpkin pie, coffee, and milk. Cook's body was returned to Joplin, Missouri, to be buried in Peace Church Cemetery.

== In popular culture ==
- In his memoir, Education of a Felon, Edward Bunker describes attacking Cook in the showers with a shank, cutting him several times before being hauled away into solitary confinement by guards. However, Bunker writes that this incident happened in 1950 in the "High Power" unit of the Los Angeles County Jail when Cook was on trial for the murder of Robert Dewey. The actual trial took place in El Centro, California, in October and November 1951. Cook was released from the Missouri State Prison in June 1950 and only in California a few months during that year and he managed to stay out of trouble. Records from the National Archives show that Cook only spent 1 day in the Los Angeles County Jail while being transported from the Alcatraz Federal Penitentiary to Imperial County to stand trial. Whomever Bunker stabbed in the shower of the Los Angeles County Jail in 1950, it was not Cook.
- The 1953 film noir The Hitch-Hiker, directed by Ida Lupino, was based on the Cook crime spree. It starred Edmond O'Brien and Frank Lovejoy, with William Talman as "Emmett Myers", a killer modeled after Cook, right down to the deformed eyelid. The plot is a dramatization of Cook's kidnapping of James Burke and Forrest Damron and their flight to Mexico.
- An in-depth portrait of Billy Cook, his crimes and execution appears in John Gilmore's 2005 book L.A. Despair: A Landscape of Crimes & Bad Times.
- Cartoonist Mark Zingarelli made a seven-page hard-boiled comic story on Cook in 1987, titled "The 'Cockeyed' Cook Story" collected in The New Comics Anthology (ISBN 0-02-009361-6).
- In the original script for The Doors lead singer Jim Morrison's film HWY, the main character is a hitchhiker named Billy, which is a reference to Cook. The events also inspired the second verse of The Doors' song "Riders On The Storm".

== See also ==
- List of people executed in the United States in 1952
