= Holy Sepulchre Cemetery (Alsip, Illinois) =

Cemetery in Worth Township, Illinois

- Interactive map of Holy Sepulchre Cemetery

Details
- Established: 1923
- Location: 6001 West 111th Street; Alsip, IL
- Country: United States
- Coordinates: 41°41′13″N 87°46′16″W
- Type: Catholic Cemetery
- Website: Official website
- Find a Grave: Holy Sepulchre Cemetery

Holy Sepulchre Cemetery is a Roman Catholic cemetery of the Archdiocese of Chicago, located in the village of Alsip, Illinois, in Worth Township, southwest of Chicago.

It was the first cemetery in the archdiocese to open after World War I, after Mt. Olivet cemetery began to run out of space.

== Cemetery grounds ==
Holy Sepulchre Cemetery is the westernmost of ten cemeteries in a two-mile radius in and near the Mount Greenwood neighborhood of Chicago. The large number of cemeteries was the basis for the fictitious "Seven Holy Tombs" area in several books by author John R. Powers. As is typical of the area, the cemetery is bordered on all sides by major roads and is surrounded by commercial and residential zones.

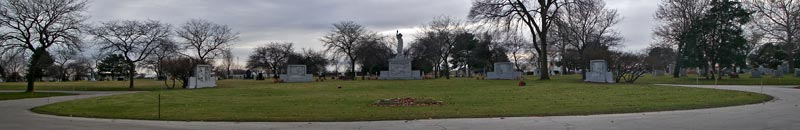
View from the main gate

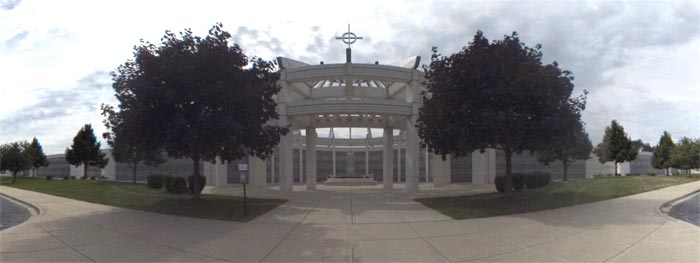
Mausoleum of the Archangels

Its most prominent feature is the Mausoleum of the Archangels. Dedicated by Cardinal Bernardin in 1993, the Mausoleum features life-size statues of the Archangels Michael, Gabriel, and Raphael. Each statue sits in the midst of a small park-like setting, with private seating areas and marble lined halls. This type of mausoleum is also known as a "garden crypt". Unlike the more traditional mausoleum layout, the burial vaults are in the exterior walls, thus eliminating interior corridors.

== Burial practices ==
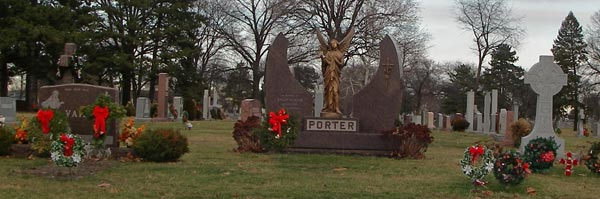
Section of family plots

The headstones in the newer areas lie flat (known as "lawn level markers") to facilitate mowing and groundskeeping. It is possible to have upright markers for family plots, but this requires purchasing multiple gravesites and using a single, larger marker. The older areas have upright headstones that run the gamut from typical markers to fanciful and artistic. There are also some mausoleums for above-ground interments.

== History ==
Holy Sepulchre Cemetery was consecrated on July 4, 1923, on the site of the Worth racetrack, which was demolished in 1911. Between 1911 and 1923 the site was used for state militia training and stockades. The first burial was on July 5, 1923.

== Notable interments ==
- Dawn Brancheau (1969–2010), animal trainer at SeaWorld
- Frank J. Corr (1877–1934), U.S. politician
- Steve Cusack (1876–1952), Major League Baseball umpire
- Richard J. Daley (1902–1976), Mayor of Chicago from 1955 to 1976
- Edna Hicks (1890s–1925), blues singer and musician
- Pete Hill (1882–1951), American baseball player, member of the National Baseball Hall of Fame
- Kevin Hickey (1956–2012), Chicago White Sox player
- Ralph Metcalfe (1910–1978), U.S. Congressman, four-time Olympic medalist
- Helen Morgan (1900–1941), singer and actress
- John Panozzo (1948–1996), Styx drummer and co-founder
- Pants Rowland (1878–1969), American baseball manager
- Dan Ryan, Jr. (1894–1961), Cook County Board president
- Walter Vinson (1901–1975), Memphis blues guitarist, singer and songwriter
