= List of unsolved murders (1900–1979) =

This list of unsolved murders includes notable cases where victims have been murdered under unknown circumstances.

== 1900s ==
- William Goebel (44), an American politician who was shot and mortally wounded on the morning of 30 January 1900 in Frankfort, Kentucky, one day before being sworn in as governor of Kentucky. The next day, the dying Goebel was sworn in and, despite the best efforts of eighteen physicians attending him, died on the afternoon of 3 February 1900. Goebel remains the only state governor in the United States to die by assassination while in office.
- Ernst Winter (19) was a German man who went missing from Konitz on 11 March 1900 after he had left the house where he was boarding. Parts of a body were found on 15 March 1900 and 15 April 1900. His murderer is unknown.
- Bertha Schippan (aged 12 to 14), who resided in the South Australian town of Towitta, was violently attacked and then murdered in her own house. Bertha was last seen alive at her house on 1 January 1902. The body of a girl was discovered in Bertha's house on 2 January. The body was subsequently identified after Bertha's parents quickly recognised the face as that of their daughter. Because she was the only person in the house at the time Bertha was last seen alive, her elder sister Mary was charged with the murder, but due to a lack of evidence she was released and the charges were subsequently dropped. The case remains unsolved.

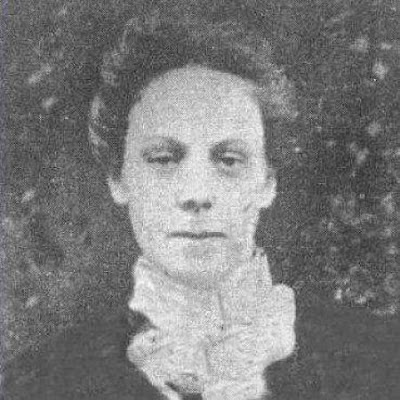
Rose Harsent, victim of the Peasenhall murder

- Rose Harsent was stabbed to death on 1 June 1902, in Peasenhall, Suffolk, England by an unknown assailant. Harsent was six months pregnant at the time of her death. William Gardiner, a preacher of the Primitive Methodist Chapel, was suspected due to his affair with the victim. Gardiner was tried twice for the murder, but each time, the jury failed to reach a verdict. The case has been featured on BBC One's Julian Fellowes Investigates.
- Al Swearengen (59), operator of the Gem Theater brothel in Deadwood, South Dakota, was found dead in a Denver street of a massive wound to his head on 15 November 1904. No suspects were named.
- The 20th Century Limited derailment was an incident that happened on 21 June 1905, on the Lake Shore and Michigan Southern Railway line, that killed 21 passengers. Despite overwhelming evidence suggesting the accident was an act of sabotage, no perpetrator has ever been identified.
- Tomasso Petto (25–26) was both a mobster and the top hitman of the Morello crime family, who was operating in New York and was active in the early 1900s. Sometime in 1905, Petto died after being shot outside his home located in Wilkes-Barre, Pennsylvania. His killer was never found.
- John Otunba Payne (66–67) was a Nigerian sheriff, administrator and diarist who was a prominent personality in Lagos during the nineteenth century. He was a Chief Registrar of the Supreme Court of Lagos, and he also served as a registrar in various colonial departments such as the Police Court, the Chief Magistrate's Court, the Court of Civil and Criminal Justice and the Petty Debt court. Payne was murdered in his residence in Lagos by an unknown assailant in 1906. His murder was never solved.
- The dismembered corpse of Jeanne Van Calck (9), was found in a package deposited in front of 22 Rue des Hirondelles in Brussels, Belgium on 7 February 1906. She had gone missing the previous day after leaving her grandparents' house. Despite public unrest, the flawed investigation from the police failed to solve her killing, and she is now remembered as a martyr for childhood innocence.
- Marinos Antypas (34–35) was a Greek lawyer and journalist, and one of the country's first socialists. Antypas was murdered on 8 March 1907, in Pyrgetos, Greece, by unknown persons who were hired to kill him. His killer was never brought to justice, and the crime was never solved.
- On 12 September 1907, Emily Dimmock was found decapitated in bed by her fiancé Bertram Shaw, in Camden Town, London, England. The sole suspect, Robert Wood, was acquitted at trial.
- Pat Garrett (57), an American Old West lawman, bartender and customs agent well known for killing Billy the Kid was himself murdered on 29 February 1908. His murder remains largely unsolved.
- A headless woman was found in the ruins of a farmhouse in La Porte, Indiana, that burned to the ground on 28 April 1908. The body was thought to have been that of the Norwegian-American serial killer and disappeared fugitive Belle Gunness (48). However, this was never proven to be true. The woman's identity remains unknown, and the murder remains unsolved.
- Caroline Mary Luard was shot twice in the head near her summer house in Seal Chart, Kent, England on 24 August 1908. Her husband, Major-General Charles Luard, was widely believed to be the killer and committed suicide less than a month later, but investigators concluded he could not have been the killer. The murderer was never identified, although some authors have sought to link John Dickman to the crime; he was hanged for another murder in 1910.
- The Guangxu Emperor (37), personal name "Zaitian", was the 10th Emperor of the Qing dynasty, and the ninth Qing emperor to rule over China proper. He died on 14 November 1908 of poisoning. One theory is that the Guangxu Emperor was poisoned by Yuan Shikai, who knew that if the emperor were to come to power again, Yuan would likely be executed for treason. Another is that the Empress Dowager Cixi, herself very ill, had him poisoned because she was afraid he would reverse her policies after her death. There were no reliable sources to prove who poisoned the Guangxu Emperor.

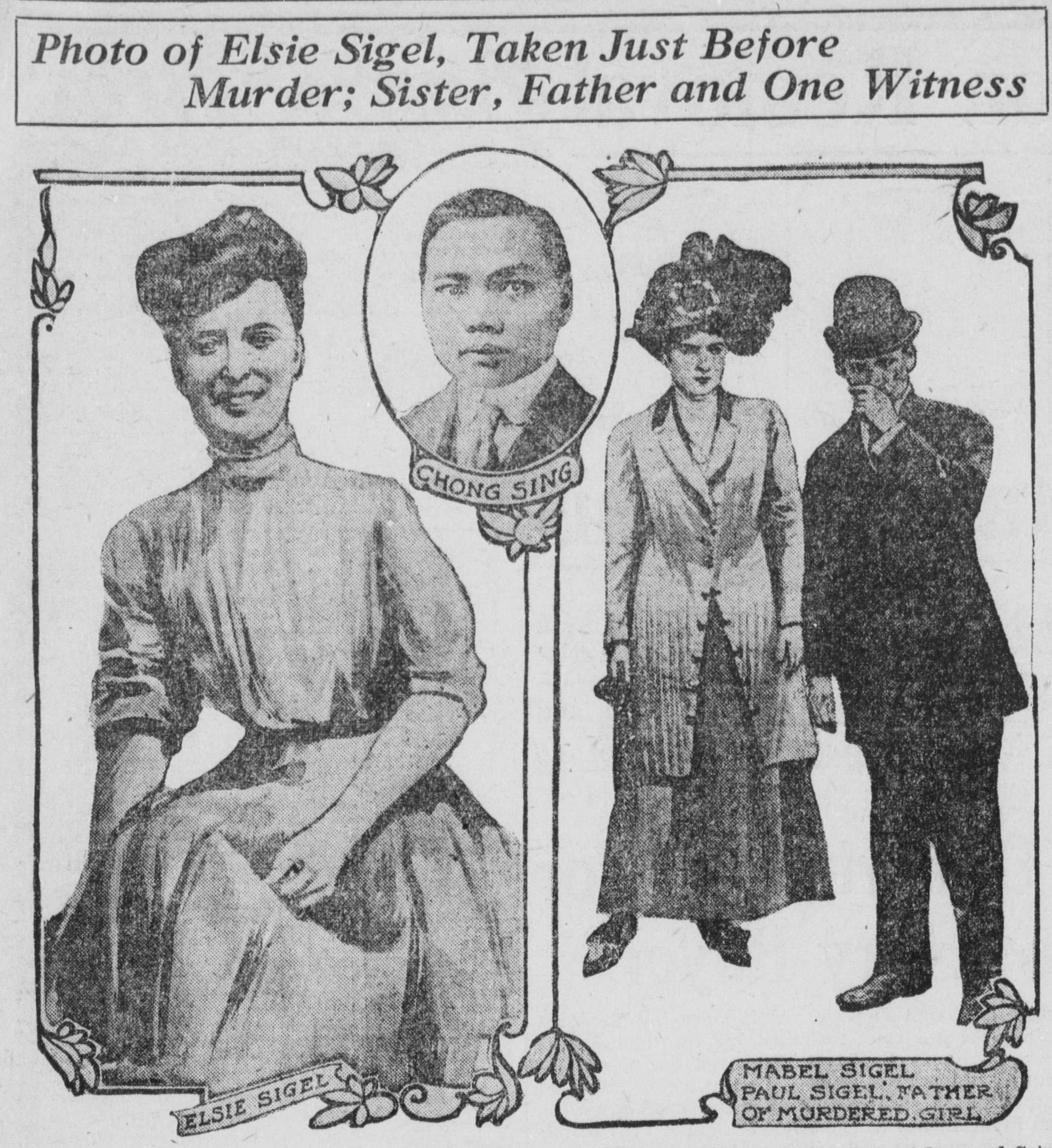
Elsie Sigel. Murdered June 1909

- Elsie Sigel (20) was found strangled inside a trunk in an apartment in New York City's Chinatown on 18 June 1909, nine days after she had last been seen. The resident of the apartment, Chong Sing, who had been having an affair with her, was considered the prime suspect, but was never arrested.
- The murder of George Harry Storrs occurred on 1 November 1909, at Gorse Hall, Stalybridge, England. He was killed for an unknown reason, and despite two trials, nobody was convicted of the crime.

== 1910s ==
- Andrei Yushchinsky (12), a student at the preparatory class of the Kyiv-Sophia Theological School in Kviv, Ukraine, was murdered on March 12, 1911.
- Elsie Paroubek (5), a daughter of Czech immigrants, is thought to have either wandered away from her home, or had been kidnapped, in Chicago on 8 April 1911. Her disappearance was the subject of intense police investigation in three states, with massive newspaper coverage. Her body was found a month later.
- Joseph Wilson (60) was a station master who was shot dead at Lintz Green railway station in Durham, England on 7 October 1911. His murder sparked one of the largest murder investigations in northeastern England.
- Child molester C. L. Harkins was tried twice for the murder of Elsie Adams (15), a teenage girl he had been raping for three years, and her neighbours Arvie and Safrania Hurst, who were drugged with morphine and then burned alive on 3 February 1912. However, both juries failed to reach a verdict and the case was never resolved. The case was later used against Harkins at his rape trial in 1916.
- The Villisca axe murders occurred between the evening of 9 June 1912, and the early morning of 10 June 1912, in the town of Villisca in southwestern Iowa. The six members of the Moore family, as well as two house guests, were found bludgeoned in the Moore residence. All eight victims, including six children, had severe head wounds from an axe. A lengthy investigation yielded several suspects, one of whom was tried twice. The first trial ended in a hung jury, and the second ended in an acquittal. The crime remains unsolved.
- Daisy Grace was accused in 1912 of drugging her husband, Eugene H. Grace, and then shooting him for his insurance money in Atlanta, Georgia. She was tried and found not guilty. Eugene's murder remains unsolved.
- Lukijan Bogdanović (46) was the last Serbian Patriarch of the Patriarchate of Karlovci and Metropolitanate of Karlovci on 1 September 1913. He was assassinated and decapitated while walking alone along a river bank in Bad Gastein by persons unknown.
- Charles Budd Robinson (32) was a Canadian botanist and explorer whose death on 5 December 1913 in the Maluku Islands may have been caused by linguistic confusion, as he was known to speak the local language quite poorly. The Malay word for coconut, "kelapa", may have been confused with "kepala", the word for "head". Robinson apparently encountered a young boy who had climbed a coconut tree. If Robinson asked the boy to cut, "potong", down a coconut, it may have been mispronounced, and heard as a threat to cut off someone's head. There was a local myth of a werewolf-like decapitator called a "potong kepala", and that he was mistaken for one.
- Billy Stone (21) was a telegraph operator who was shot and killed at the Whitby Junction Station in Whitby, Ontario on 11 December 1914. His murder remains unsolved.
- Chinese journalist Huang Yuanyong (30) was shot and killed in San Francisco on 25 December 1915. No arrests were made. Most theories about the responsible parties suggest that it was a political assassination, since Huang had increasingly been in conflict with the government of the newly established Republic of China after initially supporting it.
- Jesse Washington (17), a black farmhand who was accused of the murder of a white woman named Lucy Fryer in Robinson, Texas, was lynched in Waco on 15 May 1916 after being found guilty of the crime under controversial circumstances. Washington was dragged from the courthouse by an angry mob and paraded through the streets in chains until the mob reached city hall, where he was hanged from a tree outside, mutilated by the crowd, and finally burned alive. No-one was ever arrested, in spite of many members of the mob openly boasting of their participation in the crime.
- Joseph Henry Loveless (45) was an American bootlegger and accused murderer who was killed by unknown means, dismembered and hidden in a pair of burlap sacks in Buffalo Cave near Dubois, Idaho. It is believed that he was killed sometime during 1916, due to a wanted poster being posted on 18 May 1916, detailing clothing in which he had escaped from prison, and in which his body was later found. Nothing of his body was discovered until 1979, when a family visiting the cave discovered his headless torso. In 1991, a girl found the hand of Loveless, which prompted an excavation that uncovered both legs and arms. Loveless was considered a John Doe until the DNA Doe Project took on the case in 2019. He was identified on 12 November 2019, and his identity was announced on 31 December 2019. The post-mortem interval of the body was initially believed to be around 5 years, due to optimal conditions in the cave. The identification is considered to be the oldest attained through forensic genealogy. The case is also still considered open by the Clark County Sheriff's office.
- The Preparedness Day bombing occurred on 22 July 1916 when a bomb was detonated at a Preparedness Movement parade in San Francisco, killing ten people and injuring forty. Two radical labour activists were convicted but later released after their convictions were found to be based on perjured testimony.
- John Bamford was considered the prime suspect in the 1917 Wonnangatta murders in East Gippsland, Victoria, Australia; however, his body was found early the following year. The cause of death was a gunshot wound to the head. Several theories have been advanced, but no suspects have been identified. In the late 1970s, victim Jim Barclay's son, who later worked for a mutual friend of the two who had been an early suspect, made a statement suggesting he knew who the murderers were as well, but declining to identify them.
- No suspects were identified in the 24 November 1917 Milwaukee Police Department bombing, which killed nine officers and two civilian employees, after a citizen brought the bomb found in the basement of a local church to the local police station. Italian anarchists of the Galleanist faction were believed to have placed the bomb.
- Vladimir Bogoyavlensky (70) was a bishop of the Russian Orthodox Church. He served as Metropolitan of Moscow and Kolomna between 1898 and 1912, Metropolitan of St. Petersburg and Ladoga between 1912 and 1915, and Metropolitan of Kiev and Gallich between 1915 and 1918. Bogoyavlensky was murdered by Bolshevik soldiers on 7 February 1918, and the case has never been solved.
- Nikolay Vtorov (52) was a Russian industrialist. According to a 2006 Forbes study, which excluded the ruling House of Romanov, he held the title of Russia's wealthiest man on the eve of World War I. Vtorov decided to stay in Russia after the 1917 Revolution and pledged loyalty to the Bolshevik regime. Less than a year later, in May 1918, he was assassinated; the exact circumstances of his death remain unknown.
- Jüri Vilms (29), an Estonian politician and lawyer, volunteered to go to Finland during World War I to take funds and instructions to the Estonian missions working to get diplomatic recognition for the newly sovereign nation. He is believed to have been captured upon reaching the Finnish coast and executed by German troops in Helsinki or executed by a unit of the Swedish Brigade in Hauho.
- The Axeman of New Orleans was responsible for a number of axe attacks in New Orleans between May 1918 and October 1919, leaving six dead and six injured. The killer was never identified.
- Mabel Greenwood died on 17 June 1919 after being poisoned with arsenic. Her husband Harold was charged with the murder, but was acquitted after his lawyer Edward Marshall Hall demonstrated that the poison could not have been administered in the way the prosecution alleged.
- Bella Wright was found dead from a gunshot wound to the head on 5 July 1919, near the English village of Little Stretton. Shortly before the killing, she had been seen in the company of teacher Ronald Light, who was riding a distinctive green bicycle, resulting in the colloquialism Green Bicycle Case. As the prime suspect, Light was acting suspiciously and gave contradicting statements, but was later acquitted, mostly due to a lack of motive. The bullet that killed Wright could not be positively identified, so it has been speculated she had been hit by accident from an unrelated shooting.
- Clement De La Haye, principal of the Newington House school in Madras, India, was shot dead in his bed at the school on 15 October 1919. One defendant was acquitted after a highly publicized trial; no others have been identified.

== 1920s ==
- James Colosimo (42), a gangster who led a precursor to the Chicago Outfit, was shot and killed at his café on 11 May 1920. No one was charged with the killing; it is believed that Al Capone, then one of Colosimo's henchmen, was involved.
- Venustiano Carranza (60) was the 44th President of Mexico and former Governor of Coahuila who was assassinated on 21 May 1920 while attempting to flee persecution by revolutionaries. General Rodolfo Herrero's forces are believed to have carried out the murder, but nobody was prosecuted for it.
- Joseph Bowne Elwell (46), a bridge player, was shot and killed inside his locked house in New York City on 11 June 1920. One clearly false confession the next year was discarded, and no other suspects were identified. The intense media interest in the case inspired the development of the locked-room murder subgenre of detective fiction.
- Italian anarchists were suspected in the Wall Street bombing of 16 September 1920, which killed 38, making it the deadliest terrorist act in U.S. history at that point. Despite a number of arrests, no one was charged. One likely suspect, who was never arrested, fled to Italy shortly afterwards and never returned to the U.S.
- Chrissie Venn (13) was murdered on or around 21 February 1921, near the township of North Motton, near Ulverstone, Tasmania; her body was found in a hollow tree. George William King, who claimed the incriminating marks on his hands were from injuries sustained during the three-day search for Venn, was acquitted after a trial which was the first change of venue granted in Tasmania. No other suspects were named.

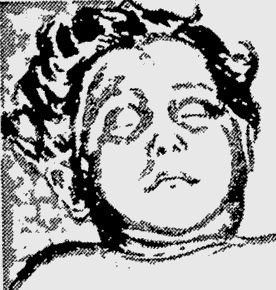
Sketch of the corpse of Little Lord Fauntleroy, unidentified since his discovery in 1921

- "Little Lord Fauntleroy", an unidentified boy who was murdered in late 1920 or early 1921, was found on 8 March 1921. He was killed by a blow to the head and drowning after being dropped into a quarry in Waukesha, Wisconsin, United States.
- Anthony D'Andrea (48), an early-era Chicago Mafia boss, was shot and killed while entering his apartment on 11 May 1921, near the end of the city's aldermen's wars. No one was charged or named as a suspect.
- On July 25, 1921 Eau Claire, Wisconsin, Police Chief Elmer Sundby(48) responded to a report of a robbery. The suspect fled towards the Chippewa River. Chief Sundby pursued the suspect and confronted him on the densely wooded river bank. Gunfire was ex-changed and Chief Sundby was wounded. He succumbed to his injuries the following day.
- Professional golfer James Douglas Edgar (36), whose book The Gate to Golf changed the sport considerably, died shortly after he was found on an Atlanta street late at night on 8 August 1921, with a leg wound. Reports that this was the consequence of his involvement in a love triangle have never led to any suspects being identified.
- Alma Tirtschke (12) was raped and murdered in Melbourne on 30 December 1921. Colin Campbell Ross was hanged for the crime, but DNA testing in the 1990s proved his innocence; the victim's family had always maintained that Ross was not the killer. Nobody else has ever been charged with Tirtschke's murder.
- Soviet politician Torokul Dzhanuzakov (28), the deputy chairman of the Central Executive Committee of the Turkestan Autonomous Soviet Socialist Republic and chairman of the Commission for Refugees in 1916, was killed in 1921 apparently on the order of Cheka authorities, but his killers remain unknown.
- William Desmond Taylor (49), a popular Irish-born American actor and director of silent movies, was killed by a shot in the back on 1 February 1922, inside his Los Angeles bungalow. His murder, along with other Hollywood scandals, such as the Roscoe Arbuckle trial for his alleged murder of Virginia Rappe, led to a frenzy of sensational and often fabricated newspaper reports, and a deathbed confession of dubious veracity. The murder remains an official cold case.
- Hans Keimes (17) was a German youth last seen alive in south Hanover on 17 March 1922. The teen is strongly believed to have been murdered by serial killer Fritz Haarmann—likely in an effort to frame his lover, Hans Grans. Keimes' parents distributed posters throughout Hanover offering a reward for information as to their son's whereabouts. In response, Haarmann visited the Keimes household, offering to locate their son "within three days". Keimes' nude, bound body was found in a canal outside the city on 6 May.
- The Hinterkaifeck murders occurred at a small farmstead named Hinterkaifeck, between the Bavarian towns of Ingolstadt and Schrobenhausen (approximately 70 km [43 mi] north of Munich). On the evening of 31 March 1922, all six inhabitants of the farm were killed with a pickaxe. Although some suspects were identified, the circumstances remain unclear, and no one was charged. The case has inspired many books, films and other works of art, fictional and non-fictional.
- Michael Collins (31), who was commander-in-chief of the National Army of the Irish Free State, was shot and killed by an unknown assailant at Béal na Bláth in County Cork, Ireland on 22 August 1922. The murder remains unsolved.
- Edward Hall and Eleanor Mills, both of New Brunswick, New Jersey, were found dead of gunshot wounds in a field in nearby Franklin Township on 16 September 1922. Hall, an Episcopal priest, had apparently been having an extramarital affair with Mills, who sang in the church choir. His wife and her brothers were charged with the crime. After one of the first trials to attract heavy media interest, they were acquitted of all charges. No other suspects were identified.
- Dorothy "Dot" King (29), a New York City courtesan, was murdered with chloroform in her apartment on 15 March 1923. Valuable jewelry and clothing had been stolen. A boyfriend, Albert Guimares, was arrested but later released; the murder remains unsolved. Theories of the case suggest that it may have been a botched robbery attempt by someone who intended the chloroform to have merely incapacitated King.
- The plane crash that killed early aviator B. H. DeLay (31), a pioneering stunt pilot, on 4 July 1923, in Venice, California, was found to have been the result of sabotage to the aircraft. No one was formally charged or identified as a suspect.
- Pancho Villa (45) was a Mexican revolutionary general and one of the most prominent figures of the Mexican Revolution. On 20 July 1923, Villa was killed while visiting Hidalgo del Parral, Chihuahua. The murder remains unsolved.
- The Lava Lake murders occurred in January 1924 near Little Lava Lake in central Oregon. The victims were Edward Nickols (50), Roy Wilson (35) and Dewey Morris (25). The three were working as fur trappers and staying in a private cabin while trapping animals over the winter. Their bodies were discovered in April 1924 in Big Lava Lake, where they had been placed under the ice sometime shortly after Christmas 1923. The men had been bludgeoned with a claw hammer and shot to death.
- Father Hubert Dahme, a popular local Catholic priest, was shot dead at an intersection in Bridgeport, Connecticut, on 4 February 1924. A local vagrant, Harold Israel, was arrested and charged with the crime. However, at the trial, prosecutor Homer Stille Cummings, later U.S. Attorney General, not only dropped the case, but discredited the evidence the city's police department had collected against Israel. No other suspects have been named; 30 years later, a witness to the killing said it was not Israel, but refused to identify the real killer out of fear for his life.
- Manuel Gómez González (46), a Catholic martyr and a Spanish missionary priest and his friend Adílio Daronch (15), a Brazilian teenage Roman Catholic, were both murdered on 21 May 1924 in Três Passos, Rio Grande do Sul, Brazil by unknown revolutionaries. The murder was never solved.
- Janet Smith (22), a Scottish nursemaid, was found dead of a gunshot wound to the temple in a home in an exclusive neighborhood of Vancouver, British Columbia, Canada, on 26 July 1924. Although she was initially labeled a suicide (despite much evidence to the contrary), her friends were able to get the case reopened and deemed a murder. The initial suspect, Chinese houseboy Wong Foon Sing, was kidnapped and tortured for weeks in an unsuccessful attempt to extract a confession. This caused a major scandal when it was discovered that various police officials and respected members of society were directly involved. Wong was eventually tried and acquitted for lack of evidence. A law was proposed, banning the employment of Asians and white women in the same household, but failed to pass.
- Responsibility for the 29 October 1924 bombing of a Canadian Pacific train in British Columbia that killed Russian émigré Peter V. Verigin (65), leader of the Christian Community of Universal Brotherhood (CCUB Doukhobors), along with eight others including a member of the provincial legislature. Government investigators believed the culprits were Verigin's rivals among the "Sons of Freedom" zealots, while many members of the CCUB-Doukhobors and Independent Doukhobors accused the government of committing the crime. No suspects have been officially named.
- Arthur Schumacher, an eight-year-old boy from Wauwatosa, Wisconsin, went missing on 24 July 1925. His body was found three weeks later. His murder remains unsolved.
- Agapit Leblanc was a Canadian fisheries officer. He was 39 years old when he died on 20 October 1926 while investigating illegal smelt fishing. His body was found underwater, weighed down with rocks.
- The Milaflores Massacre: Three Detroit gangsters were shot down in the Milaflores Apartments on 28 March 1927. The killings are widely believed to have been a revenge attack by members of The Purple Gang; two members were arrested the next day but were never charged, and the case remains unsolved.
- Croydon Poisonings : Edmund Creighton Duff, Vera Sidney and Violet Sidney all died of arsenic poisoning on 27 April 1928, 16 February 1929 and 5 March 1929 respectively. No motive or suspect was ever found.
- Hyman Goldstein (57–58) was an Australian politician who was murdered on 3 September 1928 in Coogee, New South Wales. It is believed that Federal Nationalist MP Thomas Ley played a part in his death, but this has never been proven, and the case remains unsolved.
- Morduch Halsman, a Latvian Jewish dentist, was hiking with his son Philippe in Tyrol, Austria on 10 September 1928 when he slipped and fell down a ravine. He survived the fall, but when Philippe returned with assistance, he had been beaten to death and robbed. Philippe was convicted of manslaughter and sentenced to four years in prison in a trial marked by the antisemitism prevalent in Austria at the time. After prominent Jews of the time, including Albert Einstein and Sigmund Freud, drew attention to the case, Halsmann was pardoned, and he emigrated to France to begin his career as a photographer. No other suspect in his father's murder has been identified.
- Jewish gangster Arnold Rothstein (46), an avid gambler best remembered for his alleged role fixing the 1919 World Series, died on 6 November 1928 of gunshot wounds, inflicted the day before during a New York City business meeting. On his deathbed, he refused to identify his killer to the police. A fellow gambler who was believed to have ordered the hit as retaliation for Rothstein's failure to pay a large debt from a recent poker game (Rothstein in turn claimed it had been fixed) was tried and acquitted. No other suspects have emerged.
- Meyer Zayder, the head of security at the Peregonovsky sugar factory in 1922–1925, was known for shooting Soviet military figure Grigory Kotovsky on 6 August 1925. In 1930 it became known that Zayder was killed in Kharkov, not far from the local railway station. His corpse was found on the canvas of the railway. It is likely that, after strangling him, the murderers threw Zayder's body on the rails to be run over, making it appear he'd been in an accident, but the train was late, and their plan failed. His killers are unknown.
- The Saint Valentine's Day Massacre occurred on 14 February 1929, when seven members and associates of the North Side Gang were lined up against a wall and shot by four men in police uniforms. No one was charged, but Al Capone is believed by many to have ordered the killing.
- Viljo Rosvall and Janne Voutilainen were two Finnish-Canadian unionists from Ontario, and members of the Lumber Workers Industrial Union of Canada. On 18 November 1929, the two disappeared mysteriously and were found dead in April 1930. Their killers are unknown.

== 1930s ==
- Onni Happonen (32) was a Finnish politician who was kidnapped and murdered by the fascist Lapua Movement on 1 September 1930. Happonen was later found dead, having been buried in an anthill on the outskirts of Varkaus in July 1932. Happonen's killers are unknown.
- Liverpool housewife Julia Wallace was murdered on 20 January 1931. Her husband, William Herbert Wallace, was convicted and sentenced to be hanged, but the verdict was overturned on appeal, the first such instance in British legal history. The chess-like quality of the puzzle has attracted a host of crime writers. Raymond Chandler said, "The Wallace case is the nonpareil of all murder mysteries...I call it the impossible murder because Wallace couldn't have done it, and neither could anyone else...The Wallace case is unbeatable; it will always be unbeatable." In 2018, author Antony Matthew Brown surveyed all the published theories, both evidentially and logically, in his book Move to Murder, before rejecting them all and concluding that a previously unpublished theory "is the best explanation for one of the most puzzling murder cases in British criminal history."
- Hubert Chevis (28) died on 21 June 1931 after being taken ill the previous day while dining at Blackdown Camp. It was determined that he was poisoned with strychnine which was contained in a partridge he was eating. No-one in the household had any obvious motive or opportunity to poison the partridge and the method by which it was done was never established.
- Harry C. Beasley (42), a Medal of Honor recipient who later became a police officer, died after being shot while confronting robbers on 2 July 1931. No one has been identified as a suspect.
- On 12 September 1931, Arthur Brennan (50), a World War I veteran and early Australian rules football player, was shot and killed while struggling with a burglar he was trying to apprehend on a neighbour's property. After investigating for three months, police announced that they could not find a suspect. No arrests were made.
- Eddie Mapp (20) was an American country blues harmonicist who was found stabbed to death on a street corner in Atlanta, Georgia on 14 November 1931. No one was ever charged in his murder.
- Vera Page (10) was murdered on 14 December 1931. Page was a schoolgirl from Notting Hill, London, who was last seen walking towards her home, having visited her aunt to show her new swimming certificates she had been awarded. Her raped and strangled body was found two days later. Despite strong circumstantial evidence linking a local man named Percy Rush to the crime, a jury recorded an open verdict of "Murder by person or persons unknown."
- Jack "Legs" Diamond (34), an American gangster, was found shot dead in the Albany, New York apartment of his mistress on the morning of 18 December 1931. While he had many enemies among the underworld who wanted him dead, Daniel P. O'Connell, boss of the city's political machine, claimed in an interview with author William Kennedy four decades later that he had ordered the killing after Diamond ignored police warnings to stay out of the city's rackets. However, the case remains officially unsolved.
- The von Sydow murders involved Swedish politician Hjalmar von Sydow and two of his employees who were found dead at von Sydow's town house at Norr Mälarstrand in Stockholm on 7 March 1932. The murders remain unsolved.

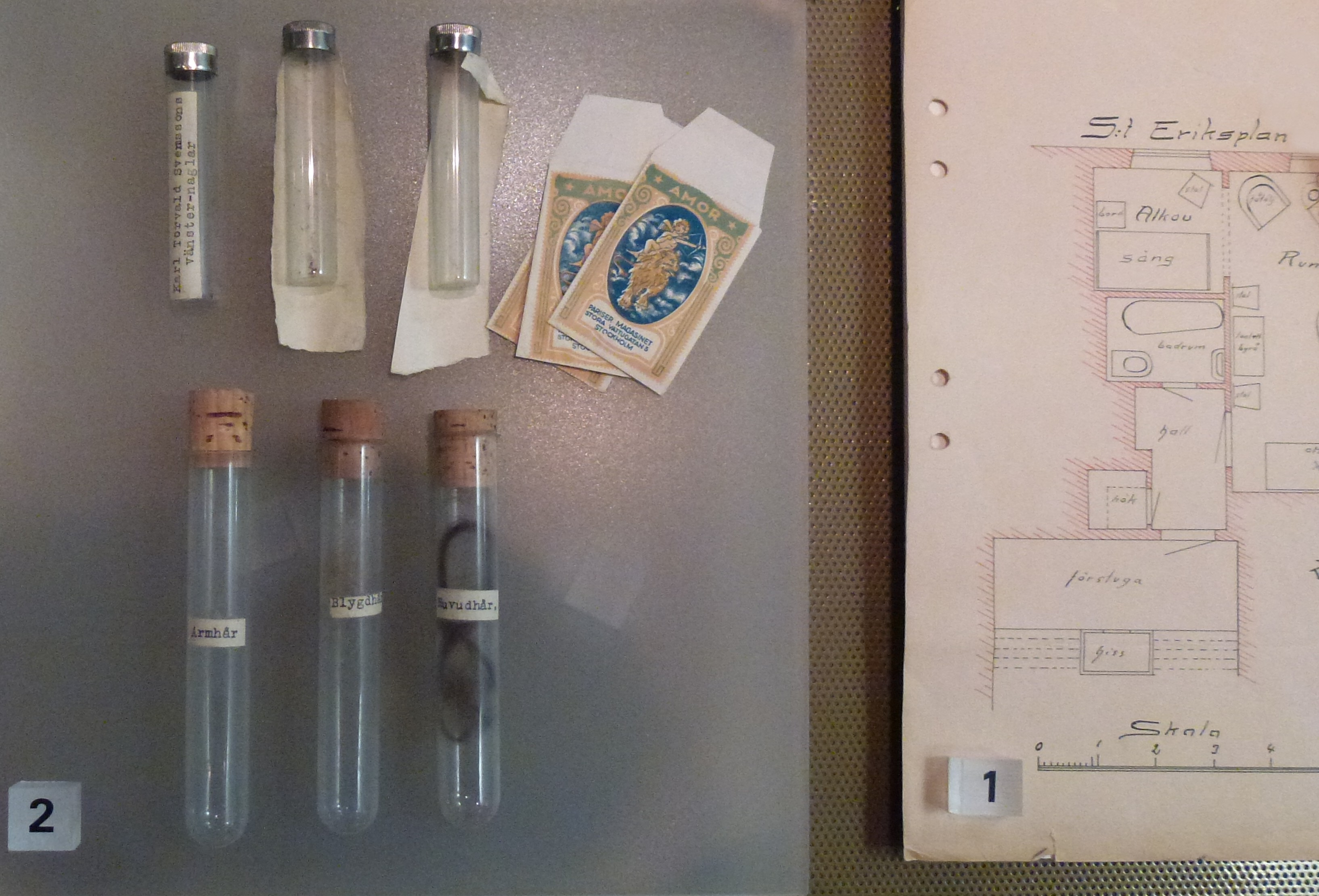
Vials of blood recovered from Lilly Lindeström's flat. Scene of the 1932 Vampire murder case. On display at Stockholm's Police Museum

- The Vampire murder case is the unsolved murder of sex worker Lilly Lindeström in Stockholm, Sweden. Lindeström was found dead with a crushed skull in her apartment on 4 May 1932. Police noted that someone had drunk her blood.
- The body of Erik Jan Hanussen (43), an Austrian Jewish publicist who claimed to have psychic powers and to be a confidant of Adolf Hitler, was found in a field in Zossen, Germany, outside Berlin in late April 1933, a month after he had last been seen on 25 March in the city. He had been shot execution-style twice in the back of the head at close range. No one was charged with the crime, but it is believed that it may have been carried out by stormtroopers. Possible motives range from resentment of Hanussen's supposed relationship with Hitler, to a desire to keep secret inside information on the Reichstag fire, which Hanussen claimed to have foreseen.
- George Wilson Becton, American preacher who in New York City died from being shot after being kidnapped on 25 May 1933 by unknown persons.
- Left-wing Zionist leader Haim Arlosoroff was shot and killed late on the night of 16 June 1933, while walking with his wife on the beach of Tel Aviv in what is now Israel, which was at the time British Mandate Palestine. Three men belonging to a rival political faction were arrested and tried; all were ultimately acquitted. Theories as to who was really responsible have ranged from the Soviets or Nazis, to a failed attempt to rape Arlosoroff's wife.
- Joan Winters (23), was a Broadway dancer who was murdered in the Garden of Gethsemane, outside Jerusalem, in October 1933. According to a UPI wire report from 4 November 1933, Winters' corpse was discovered together with the body of Mohammed Karamini. Her killer is unknown.
- Thomas Harold Thurmond and John M. Holmes, the perpetrators of the murder of Brooke Hart, were dragged from their prison cells and hanged in St. James Park on the night of 26–27 November 1933 by a mob of thousands of people angry at the discovery of Hart's body and the news that Thurmond and Holmes would pursue an insanity plea. The double lynching was broadcast live on radio. In spite of thousands of witnesses, a grand jury refused to indict the suspects and no-one ever went to trial for the crime.
- Vernon C. Miller (37), who was once a sheriff in Huron, South Dakota, had later become a freelance Prohibition bootlegger and gunman, and had committed multiple bank robberies. On 29 November 1933, Miller was found dead after being brutally murdered by unknown persons.
- Fred Goetz (37), a mobster working for the Chicago Outfit, and a suspected participant in the Saint Valentine's Day Massacre, was killed in a drive-by shooting at a restaurant in Cicero, Illinois on 21 March 1934. While it's suspected to be a hit ordered by a rival mob boss, nobody was tried for the murder.
- The Brighton trunk murders were two unrelated murders committed in Brighton in May and June 1934. In each, a woman was killed and stuffed in a trunk in order to hide her death. The first victim, believed to have been killed in June, was never identified and nobody was ever arrested for the murder. The second victim was Violette Kaye, who had been murdered in May but was not discovered until June. Her boyfriend Toni Mancini was acquitted of the murder only to go on to confess in 1976.
- Lady of the Lake – the lower half of a woman's torso, thighs still attached but amputated at the knees, washed up on the shores of Lake Erie just east of Bratenahl on 5 September 1934. The head was never found. The woman was never identified, and her killer is unknown, although it is highly probable she was the first victim of the Mad Butcher of Kingsbury Run, a serial killer who was never apprehended.
- Claude Neal (23) was a black man charged with the murder of Lola Cannady, a white woman, in Jackson County, Florida. He was moved to a jail in Brewton, Alabama for his own safety, but on 26 October 1934 a mob of white Jackson County residents abducted him from jail and took him back to Jackson County, where he was tortured and then hanged. His body was mutilated post-mortem. Although some members of the mob were identified, nobody was ever prosecuted for the murder.
- Cleveland Torso Murders – starting September 1935, at least a dozen dismembered bodies were found around Kingsbury Run area in Cleveland. Most of the victims died from decapitation or dismemberment and had their skin cured with some sort of chemicals post-mortem. Only two victims' identities have been confirmed. The murderer was never identified.
- A man who died of beating injuries and stab wounds on 5 January 1935, after a brief stay in room 1046 at the Hotel President in Kansas City, Missouri, which he had checked into under an assumed name, was not identified as Artemus Ogletree (20), until his mother in Alabama saw a magazine article about the case late the following year. His stay at the hotel was marked by unusual behavior and occurrences, and the motive for the killing was unknown; some later anonymous callers to a newspaper and funeral home suggested it had been a revenge killing for cheating on his fiancée. The case remains open.
- Welsh journalist Gareth Jones (29) was killed by bandits who had been holding him for ransom near what is now Zhangjiakou, China, on 12 April 1935. A fellow journalist with him had been released two weeks earlier, ostensibly to collect the money demanded. Since Jones had two years before been banned from the Soviet Union for life after being the first journalist to report on the 1932–33 Ukrainian famine, it has been believed that the Soviet NKVD had him killed in retaliation, as some of those connected to the kidnapping were its agents. No suspects have been identified.
- The Shark Arm case refers to a series of incidents that began in Sydney, on 25 April 1935, when a human arm was regurgitated by a captive 3.5-metre tiger shark. The tiger shark had been caught from the beach suburb of Coogee in mid-April and transferred to the Coogee Aquarium Baths, where it was put on public display. Within a week, the fish became ill and vomited in front of a small crowd, leaving the left forearm of a man bearing a distinctive tattoo floating in the pool. Before it was captured, the tiger shark had devoured a smaller shark. It was this smaller shark that had originally swallowed the human arm, which belonged to a man named James Smith, who was last seen drinking and playing cards with a man named Patrick Brady at the Cecil Hotel in the southern Sydney suburb of Cronulla on 7 April 1935, after telling his wife that he was going fishing. On 12 June 1935, Reginald Holmes, a former criminal associate of Smith, and the star witness for the inquest into Smith's murder, was found shot dead in his car in Dawes Point. The police charged Brady with Smith's murder, although he was later found not guilty, and was acquitted. Whether or not Smith was killed and fed to the shark also remains unproven.
- Louis Amberg (27–28) was an American mobster who was murdered on 30 September 1935. Less than a month later, Amberg's body was found in the back seat of a flaming car early in the morning of 23 October 1935, across from 131 North Elliot Place, Brooklyn. He had been stripped of his clothes, a sack placed over his head, and his hands were tied with wire. A witness who first spotted the flames saw several men running away from the scene. His murder remains unsolved.
- American journalist Walter Liggett (49) was shot in Minneapolis, Minnesota, on 9 December 1935, while investigating connections between that state's governor and organized crime. Kid Cann was charged, but was acquitted after he provided an alibi. No other suspects were identified.
- Federico García Lorca (38) was a Spanish poet, playwright and theatre director. On 19 August 1936, he was executed by Rebel faction forces at the beginning of the Spanish Civil War. His remains have never been found, and his killers are unknown.
- The body of Pamela Werner (19), the only daughter of British China scholar E. T. C. Werner, was found near the Fox Tower in Beijing on the morning of 8 January 1937. She had last been seen alive leaving an ice skating rink nearby the night before. After being killed by several blows to the head, her body had been severely mutilated, with several internal organs removed, including her heart, by someone with professional skills. She had also been sexually violated. An unusual joint British-Chinese investigation found some possible suspects among the city's foreign community, where she was socially prominent. However, they were unable to develop any evidence to the point of arrest, before the coroner officially concluded that the killers were probably Chinese and closed the case; after the Japanese occupied the city a few months later, there would be no further official investigations. E. T. C. Werner funded an unofficial investigation which identified an American dentist as the killer; his conclusion was endorsed by Midnight in Peking, Paul French's 2011 book about the case. However, some of the dentist's descendants have strongly disputed that finding. Other theories of the case suggest Japanese revenge for the death of two army officers allegedly at British hands the summer before, mistaken identification by Blue Shirts intending to kill Helen Foster Snow, or a local serial killer.
- Russian banker and politician Dimitri Navachine (47), was stabbed to death while walking his dog in Paris's Bois de Boulogne on the morning of 25 January 1937. No suspects have been identified, but theories as to who might be responsible suggest the Soviet NKVD, as while he had initially worked with the Communists, despite not sharing their ideology. He had broken with them under Stalin, and was reportedly about to reveal evidence which would have shown that some prominent political prisoners were in fact innocent of the crimes with which they had been charged. Another theory implicates the French fascist organization La Cagoule, which did not like a Jew closely advising the French government on economic matters and supposedly hoped that his death would be blamed on communist operatives, appearing to strengthen La Cagoule's claims of foreign Communists operating in France.
- On 16 May 1937, Laetitia Toureaux (29) was found fatally stabbed in an empty first-class car on the Paris Métro when it stopped at Porte Dorée. The crime received considerable media attention, as not only was it the first homicide on the Métro, but Toureaux had boarded the train at the previous station, meaning the crime had to have been committed in just minutes. Further investigation found that she was leading a double life, working a factory job during the day under her own name, but then at a dance hall at night under another name, and making frequent, discreet visits to the Italian embassy. Eventually it was revealed that she was a spy, infiltrating La Cagoule, a militant right wing organisation, who it is believed may have discovered this and killed her. The onset of World War II two years later put a stop to the investigation before any suspects were identified; it has not been reopened.
- King D. Gray (52), American cinematographer who was active in Hollywood, California for over two decades was shot and killed in front of a post office in Hollywood on 30 June 1938. His killer remains unknown.
- Margaret Martin (19), of Kingston, Pennsylvania went missing on 17 December 1938, and was found dead in Wyoming County, Pennsylvania several days later, on 21 December 1938. Many suspects were investigated, but nobody was convicted.
- Pete Panto (28), a labor leader who had fought Mafia control of the International Longshoremen's Association local on the Brooklyn docks who had not been seen since leaving his house on 14 July 1939, was found in a Lyndhurst, New Jersey lime pit in January 1941. No one was arrested in the case; one suspect who was questioned was found dead a month later.
- Zinaida Reich (45) was a Russian actress and became one of the main stars of the Meyerhold Theatre until it was closed under Joseph Stalin. Reich married poet Sergey Yesenin and had two children with him. After their divorce, she married the director Vsevolod Meyerhold. On 15 July 1939, Meyerhold was arrested by the NKVD, and she was brutally stabbed in her apartment by NKVD agents who staged a robbery. Her exact killers are unknown.
- After the Southern Pacific Railroad's City of San Francisco passenger express train derailed while crossing the Humboldt River near Harney, Nevada, killing 24, on 12 August 1939, investigators found that a rail had been moved out of alignment and concealed with tumbleweed. Tools that would have been necessary for the task were found disposed of in the river. No suspects have ever been identified in Nevada's deadliest rail disaster.

== 1940s ==
- Louis B. Allyn (65–66) was an American chemistry professor and influential figure in the pure food movement who was murdered by persons unknown on 7 May 1940. His is the only unsolved murder in the history of Westfield, Massachusetts.
- Moll McCarthy (37–38), an Irish female smallholder and prostitute who was murdered on 20/21 November 1940 in New Inn, County Tipperary in Ireland. The person who was charged with killing her was granted a posthumous pardon in 2015, so the case remains unsolved.
- Stanisław Bułak-Bałachowicz (57) was a notable general, military commander and veteran of World War I, the Russian Civil War, the Estonian War of Independence, the Polish-Bolshevik War and the Invasion of Poland at the start of World War II. On 28 November 1940, he was surrounded with a group of young conspirators in a house in Warsaw's borough of Saska Kępa and arrested by the Germans. According to the most common version, Bułak-Bałachowicz, was shot by Gestapo agents on 10 May 1940, in the Warsaw centre, on the intersection between Francuska and Trzeciego Maja streets. His killers are unknown, and the case remains unsolved.
- On 24 March 1941, Josslyn Hay, 22nd Earl of Erroll (39), was found shot dead behind the wheel of his car at a crossroads in Kenya. Reporting on the murder investigation outraged the British public with its accounts of carousing and partying by Lord Erroll and fellow members of the Happy Valley set while the homefront endured the hardships of World War II. Sir Jock Delves Broughton, another titled resident in Happy Valley whom Hay might have cuckolded, was acquitted after being tried with a weak case later that year; he committed suicide the following year. No other suspects have been named. The crime has inspired several dramatisations, most notably the 1987 film White Mischief, which have attempted to offer solutions.
- Harold Ball (21) was an Australian rules football player who on 9 February 1942 was captured by Japanese soldiers near Tengah Air Base, Tengah, British Malaya. He was found dead on 9 May 1942 after being murdered. His killers are unknown.
- Carlo Tresca (63), an Italian-American labor leader who led opposition to Fascism, Stalinism and Mafia control of unions, was shot dead at a Manhattan intersection on the night of 11 January 1943. Given the enemies he had made, and their propensity for violence, the list of potential suspects was long; however, the investigation was incomplete, and no one was officially named. Historians believe the most likely suspect was mobster Carmine Galante, later acting boss of the Bonanno family, seen fleeing the scene, who had likely acted on the orders of a Bonanno underboss and Fascist sympathizer who Tresca had threatened to expose.
- William Colbeck (52) was an American organized crime figure and politician who was shot dead in St. Louis, Missouri, on 17 February 1943 by an unknown person.
- An unidentified woman was found dead and stuffed in a wych elm in Worcestershire in April 1943. The case was notable for the repeated appearance of variations of the phrase "Who put Bella down the Wych Elm?" in graffiti in the area over the coming years. The victim remains unidentified, as do any official suspects.
- The beaten and partially burnt body of Sir Harry Oakes (68), an American-born British gold-mine owner and philanthropist, was found in his mansion in Nassau, Bahamas on 8 July 1943. His son-in-law, Count Alfred de Marigny, was arrested shortly afterwards, based on evidence allegedly uncovered by two Miami police detectives brought in to work the case, who had upset their Bahamian counterparts by completely taking over the investigation. However, weaknesses in the case led to de Marigny's acquittal; no one else has been tried. The murder became the subject of worldwide press coverage at the time as well as several books, films and documentaries.
- Actor David Bacon (29), best known for playing Bob Barton in the Masked Marvel serials of the 1930s, died shortly after crashing his car in Santa Monica, California on 12 September 1943. Afterwards, he was found to have been suffering from a stab wound to the chest; no suspect has been identified.
- The bodies of two young girls, Betty June Binnicker (11) and Mary Thames (7), were found on 23 March 1944. They had been killed by extreme trauma to the head and their bodies thrown in a ditch. A black youth named George Stinney (14) was executed for the crime, but the conviction was later vacated due to multiple violations of Stinney's constitutional rights and the true perpetrator was never identified.
- Georgette Bauerdorf (20), an heiress who was found face down in a bathtub in her home at West Hollywood, California, on 12 October 1944. She had been strangled with a piece of towel stuffed down her throat, and although there was a large roll of $2 bills and thousands of dollars' worth of sterling silver lying in an open trunk, Bauerdorf's jewelry and other valuables were not stolen. The police believe her murderer had unscrewed an automatic night light over the outside entrance of the apartment so it would not come on, and lain in wait for her.
- Tamil film critic C. N. Lakshmikanthan was stabbed while riding back to his home in a cycle rickshaw in Madras, India, on 8 November 1944; he died in hospital the next day, having been able to describe the attack to police, but was not able to identify the assailants. Six men, all film actors whom he had feuded with, were arrested; three were tried, and two were convicted. Their convictions were overturned on appeal three years later, but their film careers were ruined. No other suspects have been identified. The convicts were popular actors M. K. Thyagaraja Bhagavathar and N. S. Krishnan.
- Charles Walton (74–75) was found dead at a farm at Meon Hill, Warwickshire, on 14 February 1945. He had been beaten over the head with his own stick, his neck had been cut open with a slash hook, and he had been pinned to the ground by his neck with a pitchfork. His employer, Alfred John Potter, was suspected of the murder but was never charged. The case attracted notoriety due to suspicions that the murder had been related to witchcraft, and because of its similarities to the murder of a local woman, Ann Tennant, in 1875, who was also killed with a pitchfork by a man accusing her of witchcraft.
- Leon Feldhendler (34), a survivor of the uprising at Sobibor extermination camp, was shot by an unknown gunman in his flat in Lublin on 2 April 1945. He managed to flee the scene and made it to hospital, where he died from his injuries on 6 April. Contemporary accounts blamed right-wing anti-semitic militias for the crime, but modern theories point to a simple robbery.
- Nevio Skull (42) was a Fiuman Italian businessman and politician from Rijeka (now Croatia). From his father, Skull inherited the property of the "Foundry and factory machines of Matthew Skull", founded in Rijeka in 1878, and quickly became the largest private industry in the city before being taken over in 1935. On the night of 3–4 May 1945, following the Yugoslav occupation of Rijeka, Skull was arrested by agents of OZNA and disappeared. His body was found on the riverbed of the Rječina 25 days later with a gunshot wound to the neck. His killer is unknown.
- Ernst Dehmel (30), a decorated officer in the German Waffen-SS, was allegedly beaten to death by French soldiers who had him in their custody at Remscheid-Lüttringhausen on 7 August 1945. No charges have been brought.
- Oto Iskandar di Nata (48) was a fighter for Indonesia's liberation from Dutch rule, an Indonesian State Minister and a National Hero of Indonesia. Based on witness information, Oto was murdered on 19 December 1945, on a beach in Mauk District, Tangerang Regency in Banten (formerly West Java). He was allegedly abducted by a group called "The Black Troop" (Indonesian: Laskar Hitam), who killed him and dumped his body into the sea; the body was never found. His kidnappers and killers were never identified, and no one was charged with his murder.
- Oak Grove Jane Doe, an unidentified murder victim found dismembered in the Willamette River south of Portland, Oregon near Oak Grove over a period of several months in 1946. The first discovery consisted of a woman's torso which was found wrapped in burlap, floating near the Wisdom Light moorage on 12 April 1946; this led the media to dub the case the Wisdom Light Murder.
- The Texarkana Moonlight Murders were a series of murders committed by the unidentified "Phantom Killer" between 22 February and 3 May 1946. Eight people were attacked by the Phantom Killer, five of whom died. A profile was released for the killer, but his identity remains unknown.
- The Carterons, a French family of three and a foster child who lived with them, as well as their family dog, were all found shot execution-style face down on the floor of their Bommiers farmhouse on 25 July 1946, several days after signs of their apparent inattention to their farming duties had been noted by a neighbour. Robbery was seen as an unlikely motive, since the family was very poor, and there were no signs of a struggle. The investigation was hampered by the still chaotic nature of French society barely a year after the end of World War II; not until two years later was it established that the weapon used to kill the four was a Sten, a submachine gun commonly used by the French Resistance, giving rise to theories that the killings had something to do with it. A friend of Kléber Carteron said that Carterton had been claiming he was being followed the previous winter. No suspects have been named, although most residents of the area believe the killer was someone local who had a dispute with the family.

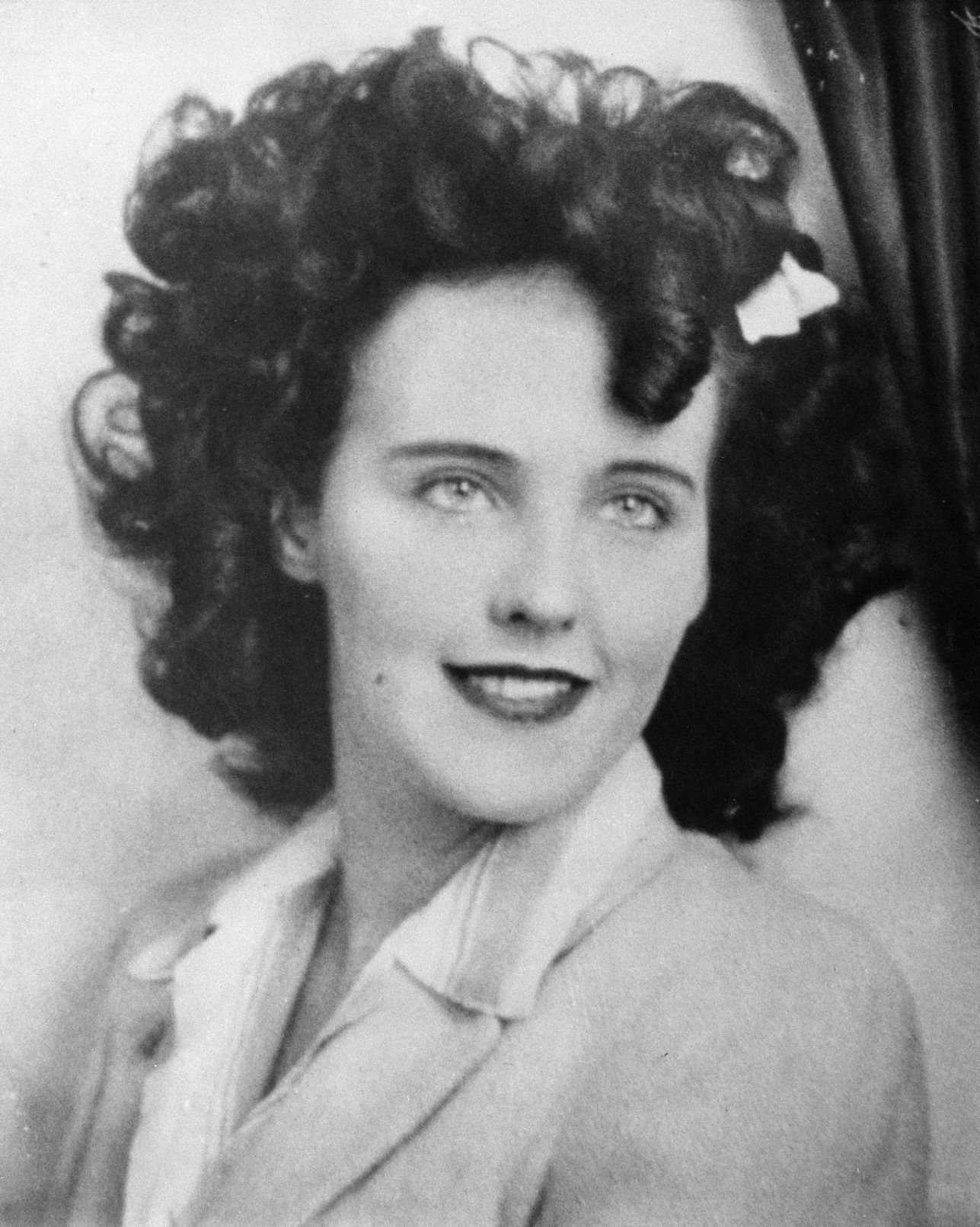
Elizabeth Short, known posthumously as the "Black Dahlia," is one of the most famous victims of an unsolved murder in American history.

- Elizabeth Short (22), most commonly known as Black Dahlia, was a woman who was found severely mutilated and her body cut in half in Leimert Park, Los Angeles, California on 15 January 1947. Her unsolved murder has been the source of several books, films and widespread speculation.
- On 20 June 1947, gangster Bugsy Siegel (41), known for making Las Vegas into a gambling destination, was shot several times with an M-1 carbine from outside as he read the newspaper at a friend's house in Beverly Hills, California. There are many suspects. Police believe he was killed by his own associates, but have never put together enough evidence against any one of them to declare the case solved.
- Two young brothers who were likely murdered in 1947 were located on 14 January 1953, in Stanley Park, Vancouver, Canada. The boys were identified as David and Derek D'Alton.
- United States Consul General to Mandatory Palestine Thomas C. Wasson was shot on May 22, 1948, in Jerusalem. He died the next day.
- The Cameo murder occurred on 19 March 1949, when a masked gunman shot and killed Leonard Thomas and Bernard Catterall during a robbery at the Cameo cinema in Liverpool. Two men, one of whom was later hanged, were found guilty of the murders, but their convictions were overturned posthumously in 2003.
- Emily Armstrong (69), found in a dry cleaner's shop in London, England on 14 April 1949, about an hour after she had been murdered. An autopsy showed she was beaten to death, and her skull was shattered by at least 22 blows from a blunt object, believed to be a claw hammer. The case remains unsolved.
- Three people died when a train derailed near Matsukawa, Japan on 17 August 1949. Investigators found that the track had been sabotaged going into a curve. Subsequently, 20 people were arrested; all of whom were initially convicted and, in several cases, sentenced to death. However, during the appeals process, it eventually emerged that prosecutors had suppressed exculpatory evidence, and after all the defendants were released in 1970, the case was closed. No other suspects have been identified.

== 1950s ==
- Philip Mangano (53) was an Italian-born caporegime and second consigliere in the Gambino crime family in New York City and reigned consigliere for 20 years between 1931 and 1951, when his brother, Vincent, was boss. On 19 April 1951, a woman in a fishing boat discovered Philip Mangano's body in a marshland area of Jamaica Bay in Brooklyn, while she had been walking through the tall grass. Mangano had been shot three times; once in the neck and twice in the face. No one was charged with his murder, so it remains unsolved.
- Harry and Harriette Moore (45 and 49) were severely injured by a bomb that exploded underneath the bedroom of their Mims, Florida, home on 25 December 1951. Harry died in the ambulance on the way to the nearest hospital that would treat African Americans; his wife succumbed to her injuries nine days later, after his funeral. They had both been active in the local civil rights movement, and investigations have concluded that was the motive for the bombing, making them not only two of the earliest martyrs to that cause, but the only married couple killed for their activism in it. By the time four suspects, all senior members of the central Florida Ku Klux Klan, were identified, they had all died, and the case was closed in 1991 with no arrests.
- Arnold Schuster (24), a clothing salesman who had provided the tip that led to the capture of legendary bank robber Willie Sutton, was shot dead outside his Brooklyn home a month afterwards, on 8 March 1952. Police interviewed 300 people, but never identified any as a suspect, although they came to believe the killing was carried out by either the Mafia or Sutton's associates. Former Genovese Crime Family soldier Joe Valachi stated that an enraged Albert Anastasia ordered Schuster's murder after seeing Schuster's television interview. The murder was carried out by Frederick Tenuto, a low-level mobster who was purportedly killed sometime later. A lawsuit against the city by his family led to a landmark state-court ruling that the state has a duty to protect anyone who cooperates with the police to the extent that they seek.
- Jack Burris (35), Mayes County, Oklahoma, county attorney, was killed with a shotgun blast just outside his house in June 1952. It has been the basis for several books and screenplays for over 50 years. Investigators were unable to obtain a tape that purported to be the killer's confession later in the decade; there have been no suspects since then.
- John Acropolis (43), a Yonkers, New York labor leader was shot by an unknown assailant in a suspected organized crime killing on 26 August 1952.
- The severely beaten body of Betty Shanks (22) was found in a Grange, Queensland, garden on the morning of 19 September 1952. The largest criminal investigation in the state's history yielded no solid suspects or leads; the case remains open.
- On 9 April 1953, the body of Wilma Montesi (21) washed up on a beach at Torvaianica, Italy, near Rome. The investigation delved into accounts of orgies and drug use in Roman society, but no one was charged.

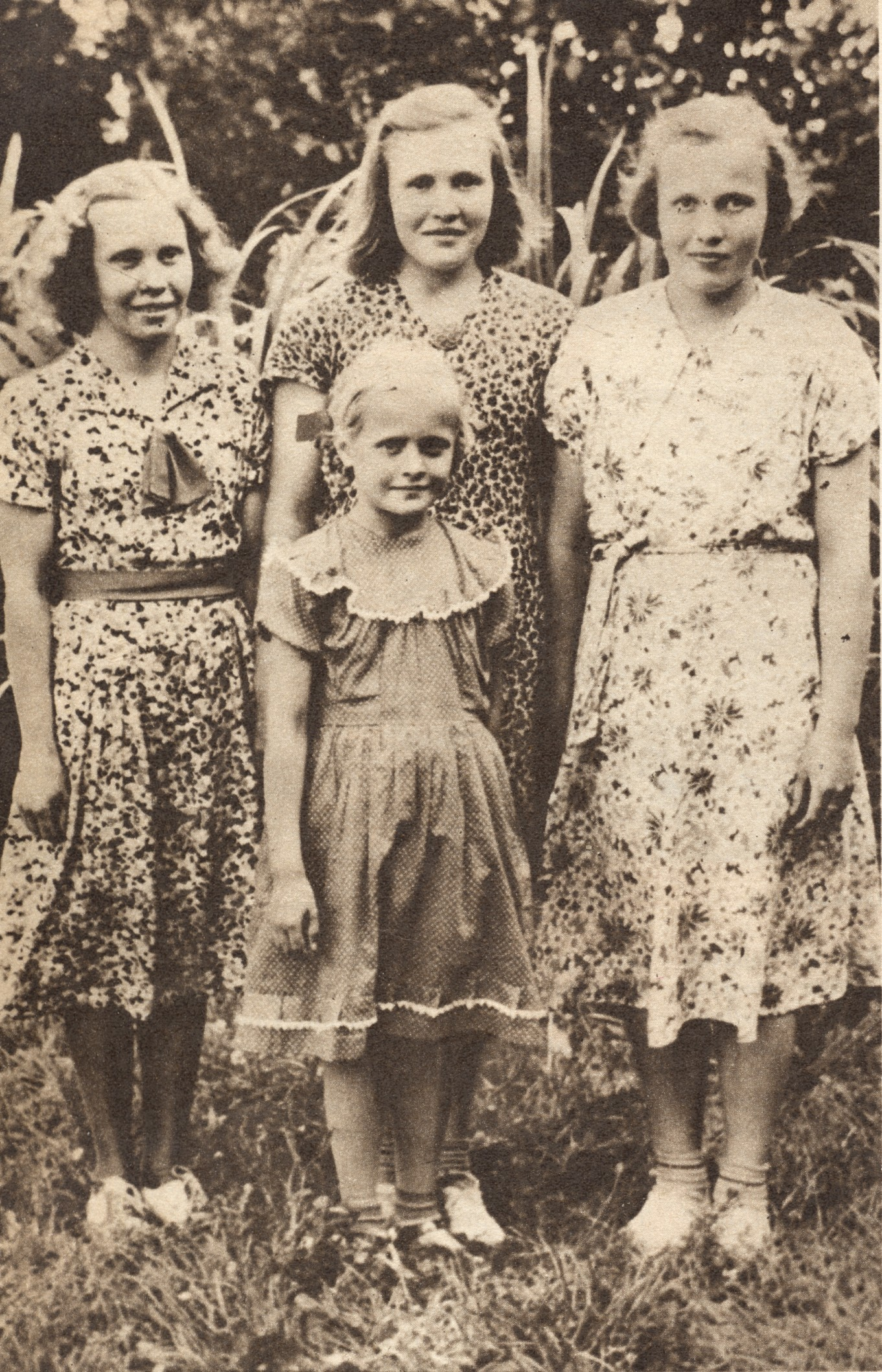
Kyllikki Saari (back right) was murdered in Isojoki, 1953. Her case remains one of Finland's major unsolved murder cases.

- The body of Kyllikki Saari (17), of Isojoki, Finland was found on 11 October 1953, almost five months after she was last seen. Several suspects have been considered, but no one has been prosecuted. The case remains one of the country's best-known mysteries.
- Alma Preinkert (58), registrar of the University of Maryland, was stabbed by an intruder in her Washington home on 28 February 1954, and died shortly afterwards. No suspect has been named.
- Marilyn Reese Sheppard, pregnant wife of neurosurgeon Sam Sheppard, was attacked and killed in their home in Bay Village, Ohio, United States, on 4 July 1954. Sam Sheppard was convicted of killing her, but this was overturned in 1966, and he was acquitted in a new trial. He claimed his wife was killed by a bushy-haired man who also attacked him and knocked him unconscious twice. Their son slept through the night, just down the hall from the bedroom in which his mother was murdered. The trial of Sam Sheppard received extensive publicity, and was called "carnival atmosphere" by the U.S. Supreme Court. The Sheppard case was a large part of the inspiration for the 1960s television series The Fugitive and the 1993 movie of the same name.
- Carolyn Wasilewski (14) was found dead in a rail yard near her Baltimore, Maryland home on 9 November 1954. The case generated nationwide media attention, and police still get calls about the case. However, no suspects have been named. Filmmaker John Waters said that the case, as well as the media frenzy over some aspects of Baltimore's youth culture of the time, inspired his film Cry-Baby, which was later adapted into a Broadway musical.
- Serge Rubinstein (46), a stock swindler and international playboy, was found strangled in his Manhattan mansion on 27 January 1955. Due to his notoriety, there were numerous suspects, but the murder remained unsolved. The following year, the film Death of a Scoundrel, loosely based on Rubinstein's life, was released.
- Early civil rights movement leader George W. Lee (51) was killed by an assailant who drove up alongside his car and shot him several times on 7 May 1955, in Belzoni, Mississippi. After local and state authorities insisted that the death was a traffic accident, U.S. Attorney General Herbert Brownell Jr. ordered a federal investigation which was able to prove it was a homicide. However, although some suspects were identified but never named publicly, no arrests were made, since witnesses were afraid to testify.
- Another Mississippi African American civil rights activist, Lamar Smith (63) was shot and killed on 13 August 1955, outside the Lincoln County courthouse in Brookhaven, where he had been helping other African American registered voters fill out absentee ballots for an upcoming primary to avoid attempts to intimidate them at the polls. Dozens of witnesses reportedly saw the killing and three men were arrested, but an all-white grand jury refused to indict them.
- William Morris Bioff (55), a labor leader with organized-crime ties, was killed by a bomb that detonated when he started his car on the morning of 4 November 1955, outside his Illinois home. No suspects have been named.
- Barbara and Patricia Grimes disappeared on 28 December 1956, in Chicago, Illinois after going to a cinema to view a screening of the Elvis Presley film Love Me Tender (1956). Their disappearance launched one of the biggest missing-persons hunts in Chicago history. However, police were not able to determine what happened to the Grimes sisters. On 22 January 1957, their naked bodies were found off a road near Willow Springs, Illinois. The corpses contained various bruises and marks, including puncture wounds in the chest that may have come from an ice pick, that were never fully explained.
- Willie Edwards (24) was a black American man who on 23 January 1957 was killed by unknown members of the Alabama Ku Klux Klan. His body was thrown into the Alabama River, Montgomery County, Alabama and was found three months later. His murder remains unsolved.
- Discovered in a box in the Fox Chase section of Philadelphia, Pennsylvania, on 25 February 1957, was a young boy. Known as "the Boy in the Box" and "America's Unknown Child", he was identified as Joseph Augustus Zarelli on 8 December 2022, and his homicide remains unsolved.
- Mafia boss Albert Anastasia (55) was shot to death while being shaved at a Manhattan barbershop on 25 October 1957. The list of suspects includes many other organized-crime figures of the era; no one has been officially named although authorities think the actual assassins were members of the Boston-based Patriarca crime family, in keeping with the mob's practice of hiring for such major hits from out of town.
- Rosemarie Nitribitt (24), a high-class sex worker, was found dead in her luxury apartment in Frankfurt, West Germany, on 1 November 1957. She had been strangled and beaten; the investigation established that this had happened three days beforehand. Police arrested Heinz Pohlmann, a businessman and friend of Nitribitt's who had visited her that day. He was tried and eventually acquitted due to questions about whether the time of death had been accurately established. No other suspects have been identified; the case has inspired novels, films and plays.
- Maria Ridulph (7), American girl from Sycamore, Illinois who disappeared on 3 December 1957, and was found dead five months later. Ridulph's killer is not known.
- Jean Ellroy Hilliker (43), the mother of author James Ellroy, was raped and murdered in Los Angeles on 22 June 1958. Ellroy later detailed his mother's unsolved murder in his autobiography, My Dark Places.
- Insurance man Harry Baker's (61) body was found just off A50 (near Knutsford), 17 days after he was last seen in Bootle on 23 June 1958. Despite many promising leads, his case remains unsolved.
- Dancer and actress Pearl Eaton (60) was found dead in her Manhattan Beach, California, apartment on 10 September 1958. The police ruled the death a homicide, but never solved the case.
- Gus Greenbaum (62), another Chicago Outfit figure, was stabbed and beaten to death along with his wife in their Phoenix, Arizona, house on 3 December 1958, supposedly as punishment for his continued skimming of casino profits. No suspects were identified.
- Mack Charles Parker (22), a black man accused of the rape of a white woman, was abducted from the courthouse in Poplarville, Mississippi on 24 April 1959 by a mob of angry white locals. The attackers dragged Parker down the courthouse steps and forced him into a car before driving him to the border between Mississippi and Louisiana, where they shot Parker and threw him into the Pearl River. The Federal Bureau of Investigation identified several suspects, but multiple state and federal grand juries refused to indict the suspects and nobody ever went to trial for the lynching.
- Kelso Cochrane, an Antiguan expatriate to Britain, was stabbed to death by a gang of white youths in Notting Hill on 17 May 1959. No arrests were made.
- Ruth Gwinn (57) was beaten and raped in Los Angeles on 28 May 1959, dying of her injuries a few hours later. Her death was later attributed to the unidentified Bouncing Ball Killer.
- Cheryl Lynne Harper (12) was last seen alive on 9 June 1959, riding on the handlebars of her friend Steven Truscott's bike near an air force base which is now Vanastra, Ontario, Canada. Two days later, her body was discovered in a nearby farm woodlot. She had been raped and strangled with her own blouse. Fourteen-year-old Steven Murray Truscott was convicted and sentenced to death for the murder, becoming Canada's youngest person to be sentenced to death. The sentence was later commuted to life in prison. Truscott was held in custody for 10 years: in 2007, his conviction was ruled a miscarriage of justice, although he was not declared innocent.
- Luciano crime family caporegime Anthony Carfano (63) and his mistress Janice Drake (31) were found shot to death in Carfano's car on 25 September 1959 near La Guardia Airport. Both Vito Genovese and Meyer Lansky have been suspected of ordering Carfano's death.
- After a friend of Dutch sex worker Blonde Dolly (32), born Sybille Niemans, found her shades drawn and the door locked on the morning of 2 November 1959, police in The Hague found her body upstairs. She was determined to have been strangled two days before, but in the years since, no suspects have been identified.
- Almost 600 possible suspects have been considered in the Walker family murders of 19 December 1959, in which two children and their parents were shot by intruders at their Osprey, Florida, farmhouse. Among them are the two men executed by Kansas for the Clutter family murders, Perry Edward Smith and Richard Eugene Hickock. The Clutter case formed the basis for Truman Capote's novel In Cold Blood.

== 1960s ==
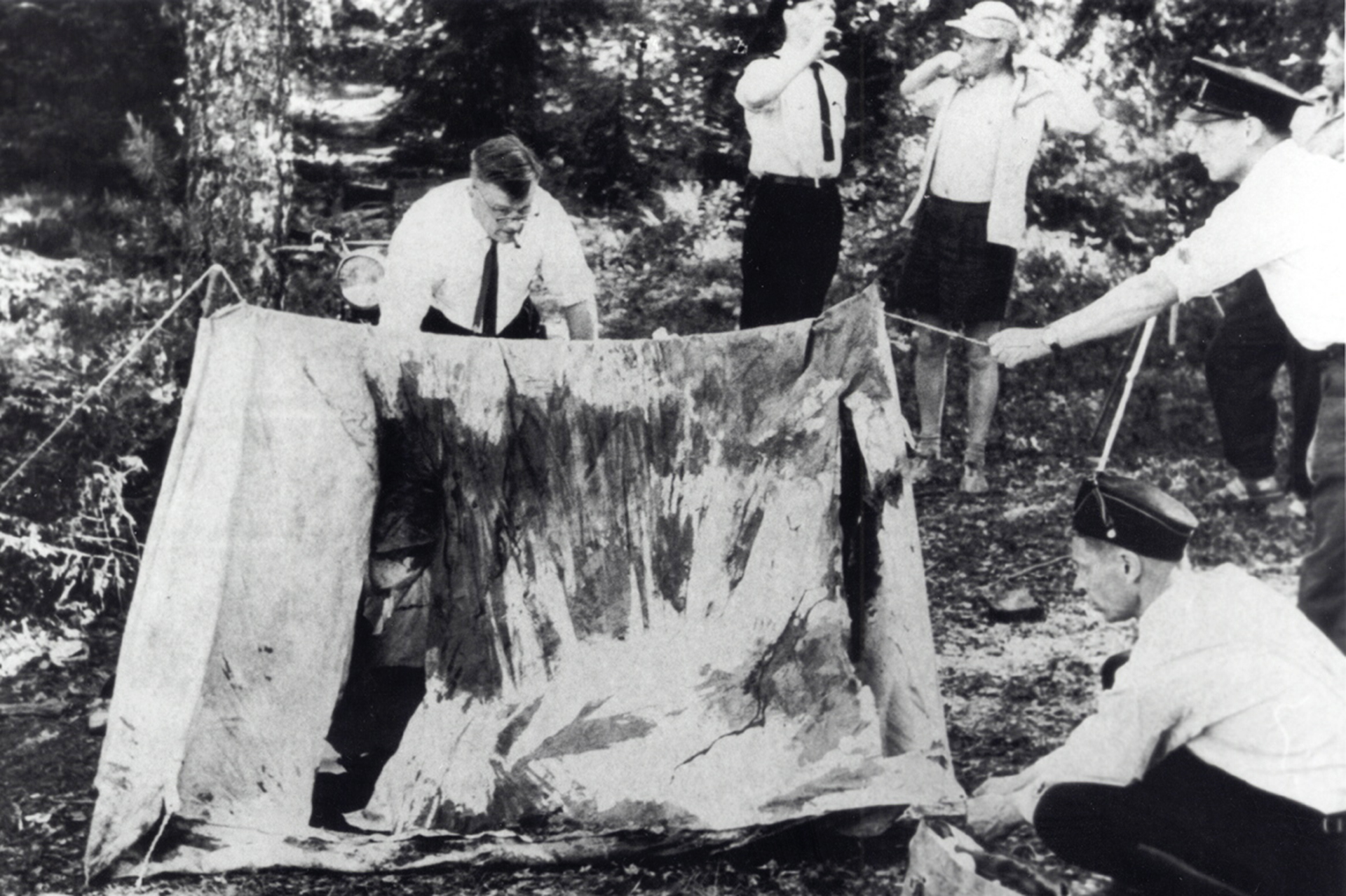
The Lake Bodom murders in Finland are a major unsolved homicide case in Finnish criminal history. The tent is investigated immediately after the murders in 1960.

- All 34 passengers and crew aboard National Airlines Flight 2511 from New York to Miami were killed on 6 January 1960, when a bomb exploded aboard the plane in mid-flight. Among them was Edward Orrick McDonnell (68), an American Medal of Honor recipient and vice admiral in the United States Navy. The FBI is still investigating the case. One suspect, a passenger under criminal investigation at the time, is suspected to have brought down the plane.
- Between 29 January and 20 June 1960, the so-called Bouncing Ball Killer murdered at least five women - Amanda Rockefellow (73), Ann Cotter (60), Bessie Green (60), Grace Moore (83) and Mercedes Langdon (72) - in Los Angeles. The victims were raped and strangled, usually in their homes. Another murder, 74-year-old Elmyra Miller, was also linked to the killer, but police concluded she was a victim of Henry Busch. The Bouncing Ball Killer was also suspected of the fatal beating of Lena Bensusen (84) on 1 September; no arrests were made in that case. The Bouncing Ball Killer was never identified.
- The Lake Bodom murders were a multiple homicide that took place in Finland on 5 June 1960. That night, four teenagers were camping on the shores of the Finnish lake, when between 4 am and 6 am, they were attacked by an unknown individual or individuals with a knife and a blunt object. Three of them died, and the fourth one was wounded but survived. Although the sole survivor became a suspect for some time in 2004, the case remains unsolved.
- Sharon Lee Gallegos (4), formerly known as Little Miss Nobody, was abducted by a pair of unknown individuals from her home in Alamogordo, New Mexico on 21 July 1960, with her body found in Congress, Arizona ten days later. She remained unidentified until 2022, but so far, the identity of her abductors remains unknown.
- Abebe Aregai, an Ethiopian military commander and prime minister, was killed in the midst of an attempted coup on 17 December 1960. Although the coup had failed, the specific perpetrators were never identified.
- Eddie Gaedel (36), known as the shortest player in Major League Baseball history, died on 18 June 1961 as a result of injuries inflicted when he was badly beaten earlier that night by an unknown person or persons.
- Italian-born gangster Alberto Agueci (39) disappeared after leaving for a scheduled court appearance on 8 October 1961. His mutilated corpse was found in a field in Penfield, New York on 23 November. An autopsy found that he had been dead for at least two weeks when found and had been tortured for several hours before his death. It is suspected that his death was ordered by members of the Buffalo crime family who were concerned that Agueci was about to inform on the French Connection heroin ring.
- Paul Guihard (30), an Agence France-Presse reporter covering the Ole Miss riot of 1962, was found dead near a building on 30 September 1962, of what turned out to be a gunshot wound. He was the only journalist killed during the civil rights movement; his killer has never been identified.
- Francis Hillman Blackwell (59), who was better known by his stage name "Scrapper Blackwell", was an American blues singer and guitarist from Syracuse, South Carolina who was shot and killed by an unknown person during a mugging in Indianapolis on 7 October 1962.
- Enrico Mattei (56), an Italian public administrator, was killed on 27 October 1962, on a flight from Catania, Sicily to the Milan Linate Airport, Mattei's jetplane, a Morane-Saulnier MS.760 Paris, crashed in the surroundings of the small village of Bascapè in Lombardy. The cause of the accident has been a mystery. There are strong indications that the crash was caused by a bomb hidden in the airplane.
- Manuel Moreno Barranco (30) was a Spanish novelist and short-story writer, who on 22 February 1963, suffered a violent death at the prison of Jerez de la Frontera.
- Chicago alderman Benjamin F. Lewis (53) was found dead in his ward office in the early hours of 28 February 1963; he had been chained to a chair, burned with a cigarette, and shot in the back of the head three times, two days after winning a lopsided re-election victory. His killing, the last assassination of an incumbent politician in the city, is believed to be related to the Chicago Outfit, but no suspects have been officially identified.
- The body of William Lewis Moore (35) was found on the side of U.S. Route 11 near Attalla, Alabama, on 23 April 1963; he was in the middle of a one-man civil rights protest, in which he was marching from his home in Chattanooga, Tennessee to the Mississippi Governor's Mansion, to deliver a letter supporting racial equality and desegregation to that state's governor, Ross Barnett. He had been shot twice with a rifle shortly after giving an interview to a local TV station; the gun's owner was identified, but neither he nor anyone else was charged.
- Steven Crawford (2) was a toddler whose body was found in a reservoir in Ashland, Oregon on 11 July 1963, but was not identified until October 2021. Upon identification, family members revealed that he had disappeared while on a trip with his mother, who later returned without him, and told them not to worry. She is now deceased, and his murder officially remains unsolved.
- Ben Golden McCollum, American bank robber who after being released from jail, was shot dead on 12 August 1963, in his home in Marcum, Kentucky by two burglars. The burglars' identities are not known, and the murder remains unsolved.
- Karyn Kupcinet (22), the daughter of Chicago newspaper columnist Irv Kupcinet, was an American actress for a brief time during the 1960s in TV, stage and movies. She was found dead at her home in West Hollywood, California on 28 November 1963, after being murdered by someone whose identity is unknown.
- Louis Allen (44) was shot dead on 31 January 1964, on his Liberty, Mississippi farm. An African American who had attempted to register to vote, and who was reportedly willing to talk to federal investigators about a 1961 murder of another black Liberty resident by a white state legislator, Allen had faced increasing harassment, and was to move to Wisconsin the next day. The sheriff at the time, Daniel Jones, has long been suspected of involvement; in a 2011 television interview he denied it. No one has been prosecuted.
- Multimillionaire Jacques Mossler (64) was beaten and stabbed to death at his residence in Key Biscayne, Florida on 29 June 1964. His wife, Candy Mossler, and her nephew, Melvin Lane Powers, stood trial for the murder in 1966, with prosecutors alleging that they killed Jacques in order to continue their incestuous affair. They were acquitted by a jury after four days of deliberation. No other suspects have been named.
- Mary S. Sherman (51), an orthopedic surgeon and bone cancer specialist, was found dead of stab wounds and burns in her New Orleans apartment on 21 July 1964. No suspects have been named.
- Mary E. McGreevy (64), American woman was murdered on 17 August 1964 in her home in Florida by an unknown serial killer known as the Miami Strangler who was never caught.

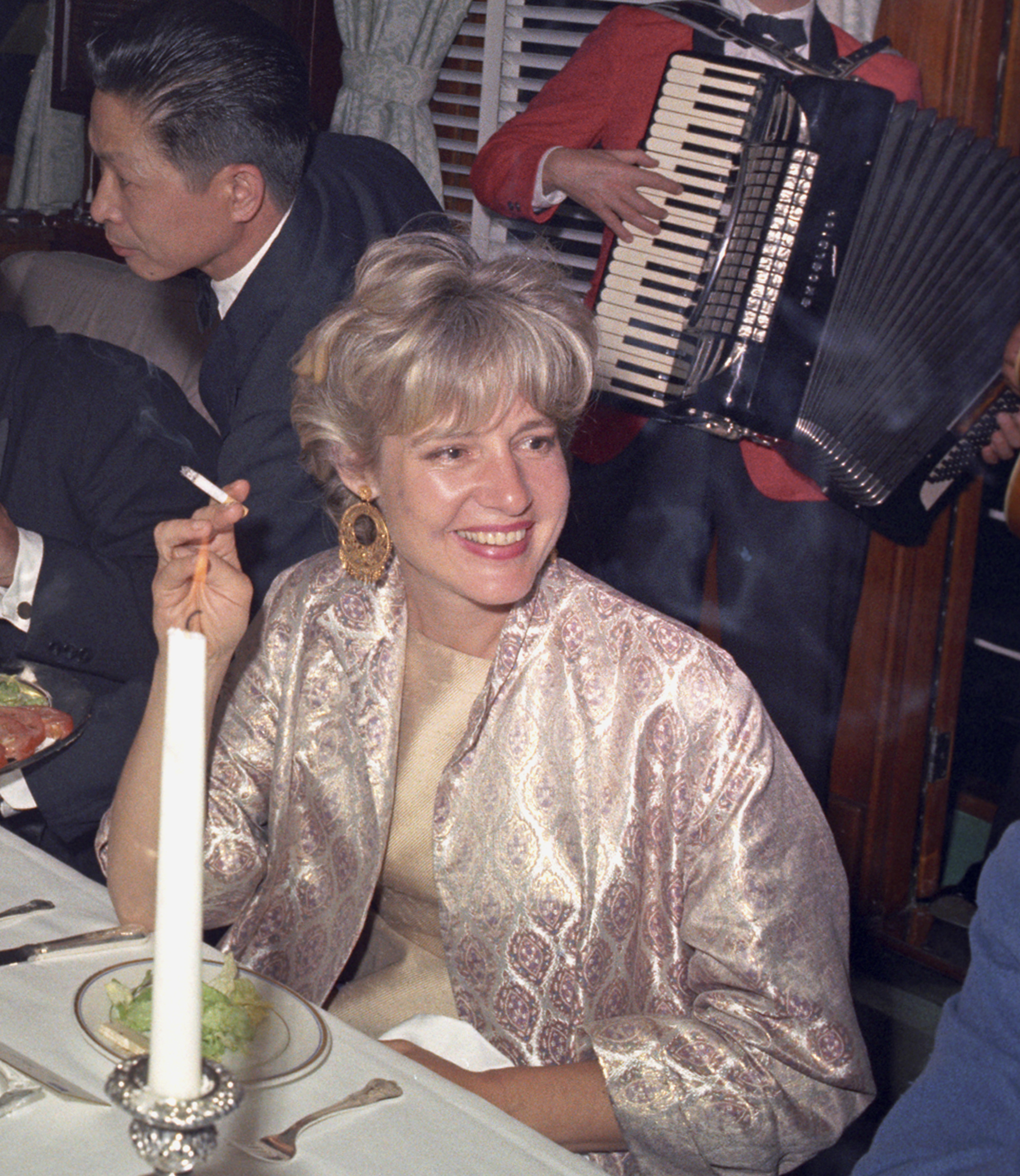
Mary Pinchot Meyer was murdered alongside the towpath of the Chesapeake and Ohio Canal on 12 October 1964.

- Mary Pinchot Meyer (43) was a socialite from Washington, D.C. who had been married to CIA Director of Operations Cord Meyer, and mistress of U.S. President John F. Kennedy. On 12 October 1964, Meyer was shot once in the head and once in the chest by an assailant while walking along the towpath of the Chesapeake and Ohio Canal. A witness identified the assailant as Raymond Crump Jr., but without hard evidence, Crump was tried, acquitted and released.
- Frank Morris (50) died in a coma on 14 December 1964, the result of burns sustained during an arson attack on his Ferriday, Louisiana, shoe store four days earlier. He was able to describe the two attackers to the FBI before then; the FBI thinks he may have known them but did not want to identify them as they may have been members of the Silver Dollar Group, a particularly violent local KKK organization, who may have thought Morris insufficiently respected the area's white community. Three official investigations were launched, the last one closing in 2016; these have not identified any suspects, although it is speculated that whoever was involved is likely deceased.
- The bodies of Marianne Schmidt and Christine Sharrock, both 15, were found beaten and stabbed on Wanda Beach near Sydney on the morning of 11 January 1965, having last been seen on the beach the previous evening; the killer had allegedly also attempted to rape them. Several suspects have been identified over the years, but none formally charged; a DNA sample was taken from the preserved blood and semen at the scene, but it is not known if a match has been made.
- Malcolm X (39), an African American Muslim minister and civil rights activist, was shot 21 times by three gunmen while preparing to give a speech in Washington Heights on 21 February 1965. Three alleged killers were convicted, but two, Muhammad Abdul Aziz and Khalil Islam, were later exonerated. The true attackers are unknown, although the sole identified gunman, Thomas Hagan, named four others who he claimed were involved with him.
- James Reeb (38), a Unitarian minister from Philadelphia, died on 11 March 1965, in a Birmingham, Alabama hospital of injuries sustained during a beating at a restaurant outside Selma four days earlier, where he was dining with other civil rights activists. Four men were indicted for the crime; three were acquitted and one fled the state. The FBI reopened the case in 2007, only to close it four years later, as the only living suspect was among those acquitted.
- On 25 March 1965, Viola Liuzzo (39), a civil rights activist from Michigan, was shot and killed after a car driven by four local Klansmen ran hers off an Alabama highway outside Selma. The four Klansmen were arrested, but prosecutions were complicated since one was an FBI informant. The other three were convicted on broad federal civil rights charges, but the only suspect to face trial on the murder charge was acquitted, despite a strong circumstantial case brought by prosecutors.
- Oneal Moore (34) was the first black deputy sheriff for the Washington Parish Sheriff's Office in Varnado, Louisiana. He was murdered on 2 June 1965, by alleged members of the Ku Klux Klan in a drive-by shooting, one year and a day after his landmark appointment as deputy sheriff. The murder remains unsolved.
- No suspects have been identified in the 8 July 1965 bombing of Canadian Pacific Air Lines Flight 21 above British Columbia, which killed all 52 aboard.
- Suellen Evans (21), American college student in North Carolina who on 30 June 1965 was stabbed to death by unknown persons. Her murder has never been solved.
- Alberta Odell Jones (34), a female African-American civil rights icon and attorney who was murdered on 5 August 1965 in Louisville, Kentucky, by someone whose identity was unknown. The murder remains unsolved.
- The bombing that killed all 66 passengers and crew of Cyprus Airways Flight 284 over the Mediterranean between Greece and Cyprus on 12 October 1965, remains unsolved.

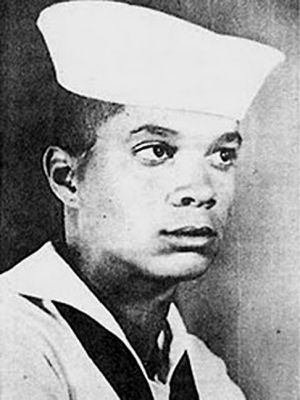
Sammy Younge Jr. was murdered in Tuskegee on 3 January 1966.

- Sammy Younge Jr. (21) was shot and killed 3 January 1966 in Tuskegee, Alabama, by a gas station attendant with whom he had been arguing while trying to use a bathroom reserved for whites. He had been a member of the Student Nonviolent Coordinating Committee, which decided three days later to start opposing the Vietnam War, as a result of his death. The attendant's trial was moved to a neighboring, whiter county, where he was acquitted by an all-white jury in December.
- Bernadita Gonzalez (44), disappeared in February 1966 and was found dead 8 weeks later after being killed and is believed to have murdered by the unknown Miami Strangler.
- Wendy Wolin (7) was an American female child who was murdered close to the Elizabeth River on 8 March 1966 by an unknown person. Her case has never been solved.
- Early in the morning of 17 June 1966, two black men walked into a Paterson, New Jersey bar and began shooting. The bartender and one patron died at the scene; a female customer died of her wounds a month later. Former professional boxer Rubin Carter and a friend, John Artis, were charged with the crime, and convicted the following year, despite their own alibi, weak evidence and alleged racial bias by police and prosecutors. They always protested their innocence, and their case became a cause celebre, inspiring Bob Dylan's "Hurricane". In 1978, they won a second trial, but were convicted again; after another habeas corpus petition was granted in 1985, the state declined to retry them. No other suspects have been identified.
- Clarence Triggs (24) was an African-American bricklayer and veteran, who was murdered on 30 July 1966, in Bogalusa, Louisiana, about a month after participating in a civil rights march for voting. His murder remains unsolved.
- Allen Redston (6) was an Australian schoolboy from Bendigo, Victoria. He was kidnapped and murdered on 28 September 1966 in Curtin, Canberra, Australian Capital Territory, having disappeared the previous day. No one was charged with his murder, and the person who was thought to have killed him had denied involvement, and is now deceased.
- Cheri Jo Bates (18) was a young college freshman who was murdered in Riverside, California on 30 October 1966. Bates was stabbed and slashed to death on the grounds of Riverside City College. Police determined the assailant had disabled the ignition coil wire and distributor of Bates' Volkswagen Beetle, as a method to lure her from her car as she studied in the college library. The murder has been described as an event which, "stripped Riverside of its innocence".
- Ephraim Kapolo (23–24) was a Namibian activist who participated in the pre-independence movement. Kapolo was arrested, along with other prominent members of SWAPO, following the battle of Omugulugwombashe. He was detained with no trial, and was held in solitary confinement in Pretoria, South Africa for more than a year. He died in police custody in 1967 during the "terrorism trial". The cause of death was ruled a murder, but the killers are unknown.
- Mohamed Khider (54) was an Algerian politician, who was assassinated in Madrid, Spain on 4 January 1967. Most observers blamed his murder on Col. Boumédiène, though the actual perpetrators are unknown.
- Wharlest Jackson (26–27), who was the treasurer of the Natchez, Mississippi branch of the National Association for the Advancement of Colored People until 27 February 1967, when he was murdered after a car bomb that was placed under the driver side seat of his truck exploded and killed him. Whoever was behind the attack remains unknown.
- Mima McKim-Hill (21) was an Australian woman who was abducted, sexually assaulted and strangled on 9 March 1967. After she had gone missing, her body was found on 26 March 1967, north-east of Biloela. Her murder remains an unsolved cold case.
- Cook County, Illinois, deputy sheriff Ralph Probst (30) was shot and killed in the kitchen of his Hometown home from outside on 10 April 1967. In the weeks before his murder, he had told family and coworkers that he was investigating "something big" that would lead to his promotion. Since he had been working in the organized-crime unit, suspects have been named, including Silas Jayne, but none have been charged.
- On 25 August 1967, two men dressed as road maintenance workers stopped Hong Kong radio commentator Lam Bun (37), as he drove home, then poured petrol all over him, a cousin who was with him, and his car, all of which they then set aflame. Both Lam and his cousin died; it is believed that the killers may have been associated with the leftist groups that Bun often ridiculed on air during that year's ongoing leftist riots, since many of the latter have refused to condemn the killing. While public outrage over the killing led the government to finally suppress the protests and riots, no arrests have been made.
- John Frey, an Oakland, California, police officer, was fatally shot on the morning of 28 October 1967, during a traffic stop where he had pulled over Black Panther leader Huey P. Newton, who was wounded in the shootout and convicted of voluntary manslaughter the following year. The gun Newton purportedly used was never found, and following two hung juries after the conviction was overturned on appeal in 1970 the district attorney's office announced it would not try him a fourth time. Newton suggested that Frey had been shot by his partner; there has been no new investigation to determine whether this was the case and whether this was an accident.
- All six members of the Robison family were found shot in the head in their Good Hart, Michigan, vacation cabin on 22 July 1968; investigators established that the killings had taken place on 25 June. A lengthy investigation led police to Joseph Scolaro, an employee of Richard Robison's, who may also have been embezzling from him. There was much circumstantial evidence linking him to the crime, but it was not enough to charge him. Four years later, the case was reopened in the Robisons' county of residence; when Scolaro learned that he was about to be charged this time, he committed suicide, leaving behind a typed suicide note in which he confessed to previous thefts and swindles, but protested his innocence of the Robison killings. The case remains officially open.
- Melitón Manzanas (61–62) was a high-ranking police officer in Francoist Spain, known as a torturer and the first planned victim of ETA. On 2 August 1968, he was murdered in the first planned killing committed by ETA in response to the killing of Txabi Etxebarrieta, after being shot seven times. The murder remains unsolved.
- On 1 October 1968, the body of Stevan Marković (31), Serbian-born bodyguard to French film star Alain Delon, was found in a garbage dump on the western outskirts of Paris. Possible nude photographs of the wife of French president Georges Pompidou were found in his car shortly afterwards, leading to a political scandal around allegations of blackmail and Marković's connections to Corsican organized crime. The murder officially remains unsolved.
- David Arthur Faraday (17) and Betty Lou Jensen (16) were shot to death on 20 December 1968, in Benicia, California. Faraday and Jensen were the first murders attributed to the Zodiac Killer. The Zodiac murders have never been solved.
- Barbara Ann Hackmann Taylor's (24) body was found alongside a road near Georgetown, Kentucky, on 17 December 1968. Until her identification in 1998, she was known only as "Tent Girl". Her husband was suspected at the time, but is now deceased.
- Edwin T. Pratt (38), then-director of the Seattle Urban League, was shot and killed outside his Shoreline, Washington, home on 26 January 1969. Despite an extensive investigation, no arrests were made. Later research by area newspapers has identified three likely suspects, all of whom have since died.
- Vjekoslav Luburić (55), a former official in the Independent State of Croatia and wanted war criminal, was beaten to death in his home in Carcaixent, Spain, on 20 April 1969. No suspects were ever officially identified, although an agent of the Yugoslavian secret service made multiple contradictory admissions to the killing.
- Christine Rothschild (18), freshman at the University of Wisconsin - Madison, was found stabbed to death on campus, outside of Sterling Hall, on May 26, 1969. The case and its lack of resolution despite a suspect is described in the book "Murder on the 56th Day" by Linda Schulko.
- Clarence 13X (41), founder of Five-Percent Nation (splinter group of the Nation of Islam) was fatally shot by a group of attackers in the lobby of his wife's Harlem, New York apartment building on the morning of 13 June 1969. One suspect was arrested two months later; charges were dropped. New York police believe the murder was related to an extortion attempt; no other suspects have been named.
- On 10 July 1969, Patricia Ann Veach (8) was found sexually assaulted and murdered in her bedroom in Des Moines, Iowa, with cause of death determined to be suffocation by smothering; there were no apparent signs of forced entry, and an interrogation by police of more than 500 individuals did not lead to a definitive suspect. Authorities later investigated a possible link to Robert Williams (Anthony Erthel Williams), a psychiatric hospital escapee who had been convicted of the abduction, sexual assault, and murder of 10-year-old Pamela Powers from a Des Moines YMCA only months before Patricia Veach's murder, but no concrete connection could be established and Williams continued to maintain his own innocence in the case for which he had been convicted. Crime lab studies of specimens from the scene were inconclusive, and police continue to seek tips and leads.
- On August 3, 1969, a body of an unidentified young woman (known as Lompoc Jane Doe), was discovered near an abandoned quarry outside Lompoc, California. She had been stabbed multiple times and was believed to have died several days before her discovery. The case inspired Sue Grafton's 2002 novel "Q" Is for Quarry and later played a role in the founding of the DNA Doe Project. Both the victim's identity and that of her killer remain unknown. Investigators speculated the possibility of the case being connected to Charles Manson and his followers due to the similarities to the Tate–LaBianca murders as well as reports that members of the Manson Family had been seen in the Lompoc area earlier in 1969.
- Sherivon Dolores Wooten (21), was murdered on 19 August 1969 in Florida on a dirt road by an unknown serial killer known as the Miami Strangler .
- Catherine Cesnik (27) was a Roman Catholic nun who taught English and drama at the formerly all-girls Archbishop Keough High School in Baltimore, Maryland. On 7 November 1969, Cesnik disappeared. Her body was discovered on 3 January 1970 near a garbage dump in the Baltimore suburb of Lansdowne. Her homicide remains unsolved.
- Joyce Malecki (20) was an American office worker from Baltimore who was employed at a liquor distributor. She disappeared on 11 November 1969. Her body was discovered on 13 November 1969, at the Soldier Park training area of Fort Meade. Her murder remains unsolved.
- Betsy Aardsma (22), from Holland, Michigan, was a graduate student at Penn State University. She was stabbed to death in the stacks of Pattee Library on Penn State's campus on 28 November 1969. She was stabbed a single time through the heart with a single-edged small knife. Approximately one minute later, two men told a desk clerk, "Somebody better help that girl," and then left the library. The men were never identified. Twenty-five to 35 minutes later, she was pronounced dead at the hospital. She had been wearing a red dress, and since there was only a small amount of blood visible, no one realized immediately that she had been stabbed.

== 1970s ==
- David Chingunji (34–35) served as a top commander in the National Union for the Total Independence of Angola (UNITA), who became pro-Western rebels in the subsequent Angolan Civil War. Chingunji died when UNITA forces tried to ambush Portuguese forces in 1970, and whoever killed him remains unknown.
- Prison guard John V. Mills (25) was beaten and thrown over a third-floor railing at Soledad State Prison, California on 16 January 1970. His death was allegedly retaliation for the killing of three inmates by another guard, who had been cleared by a grand jury earlier that day. Three inmates, known as the Soledad Brothers, were charged with his murder. One of the accused died before trial when he was shot during an escape attempt, and the other two stood trial and were acquitted.
- San Francisco police Sgt. Brian McConnell died of fatal shrapnel wounds suffered in the bombing of a police station on 16 February 1970. Later investigations suggested the Weather Underground terror group was involved, but no individual suspects have been named.
- On March 10, 1970, on Calendar Road in Rock Creek, Ohio, police chief Robert Hamrick struck a tree with his car after sliding off an icy dirt road. Upon exiting the vehicle, he was beset by multiple men who beat him unconscious with a tire iron. The suspects were never found. Hamrick never regained consciousness and died ten days later.
- Bernadette Connolly (10) was abducted and murdered in Collooney, County Sligo, Ireland on 17 April 1970. Her body was found in a bog 15 mi (24 km) away in August 1970, with evidence of sexual assault. The prime suspect was a Catholic priest named Fr Columba Kelly (brother of High Court judge Cyril Kelly) who lived in a Passionist retreat; Bernadette was cycling to a neighbour 2.5 mi (4 km) away to buy haddock and potatoes, and her route took her near St Joseph’s Retreat. Fr Columba was a close friend of the family, and there were questions over his movements on the day of the murder. In June 1970 he went to a retreat in County Donegal, and then was transferred by the Passionists to Botswana. He died in 2001. No arrests were ever made and no-one was charged with the murder. The local Gaelic games playing fields are named Connolly Park in Bernadette's honour.
- Mary Louise Clark Danford (21), American woman who was found strangled to death in her Florida home on May 5, 1970. She is believed to be a victim of the unknown Miami Strangler.
- Melvin X (22), co-founder of the UCLA Black Student Union, was found fatally shot in the driver's seat of a borrowed car outside Mira Loma, California, in June 1970. He had last been seen the previous evening. A suspect, who was arrested four months later on unrelated charges in Las Vegas, was released after passing a lie detector test, along with two other persons of interest. The case remains open.
- Ruth Boehner (64), American woman who was found dead in her Florida apartment on June 2, 1970, after being attacked. She is believed to have been murdered by the unknown Miami Strangler.
- Leon Jordan (65), a civil rights movement leader in Kansas City, Missouri, was shot dead outside a tavern he owned on July 15, 1970. Three men, connected with local organized crime, were arrested and charged with the crime; one was acquitted, and charges were dropped against the other two. In 2010, the case was reopened after The Kansas City Star uncovered evidence that had gone missing during the original investigation; it uncovered more definite evidence that the killing was a mob hit, but by then, all the suspects were deceased. The murder remains unsolved.
- Mattie Ophelia Harris (84), American woman who was found dead in her Florida home on 5 August 1970. She is believed to have been murdered by the unknown Miami Strangler.
- Jacqueline Ansell-Lamb (18) and Barbara Mayo (24) were found dead while hitchhiking up motorways in England in March and September 1970, respectively. Police believe the same man is responsible, and a DNA profile was extracted in the Mayo case in 1997.
- The bodies of Harvey and Jeannette Crewe (28 and 30) were found in New Zealand's Waikato River near their Pukekawa farm in August and September 1970, respectively. They had been reported missing on 22 June of that year, five days after last being seen. Both had been shot with a rifle. After a short investigation, police arrested Arthur Allan Thomas, another farmer, later that year. He was tried and convicted twice, but there was evidence that police had fabricated key evidence against him. This led to an inquiring commission that severely criticized two of the lead investigators without holding them accountable, and Prime Minister Robert Muldoon pardoned Thomas in 1979. Authorities have never identified any other suspects, although two journalists have written books proposing alternative theories of the case.
- Investigations have strongly suggested that Italian journalist Mauro De Mauro (49), who disappeared on 16 September 1970, was killed by the Mafia to prevent him from completing his own inquiry into the death of Enrico Mattei after he was kidnapped while returning from work in Palermo. However, it has never been clear which of several possible motives led to his death, and his body has never been found. In 2011, the only living suspect was tried and acquitted; the prosecution continues to appeal.
- Kelly Lynn Albright (12) disappeared from her family home in Reno County, Kansas, on 17 September 1970, and was found murdered with signs of sexual assault and multiple stab wounds in a nearby sorghum field 3 days later. Although a family friend was strongly suspected based on circumstantial evidence, formal charges were not brought, in part due to an apparent loss of DNA and other forensic evidence in the midst of the investigation; authorities continue to solicit leads and to retrieve forensic evidence in an attempt to solve the case.
- E.C. Mullendore III (32) was an American heir of a very large cattle ranch in Oklahoma and was murdered on 26 September 1970. The murder remains unsolved, and has captured much attention.
- Regina Bonnanno (48), American deaf-mute woman who was found dead in her Florida apartment on 10 October 1970. She is believed to have been murdered by the unknown Miami Strangler.
- Patrice Finer Newkirk (36), American woman who was found dead in her Florida in the trunk of her car on 26 October 1970. She is believed to have been murdered by the unknown Miami Strangler.
- Little Miss Lake Panasoffkee was found murdered in Lake Panasoffkee, Florida on 19 February 1971. She was unidentified until October 2025 when she was determined to be 21-year-old Maureen Rowan (née Minor).
- Mary Francis Sims (31), American housewife in Miami, Florida was found dead in her home in March 1971 after being murdered after being strangled, sexually assaulted and stabbed. She is believed to be a victim of the unknown Miami Strangler.

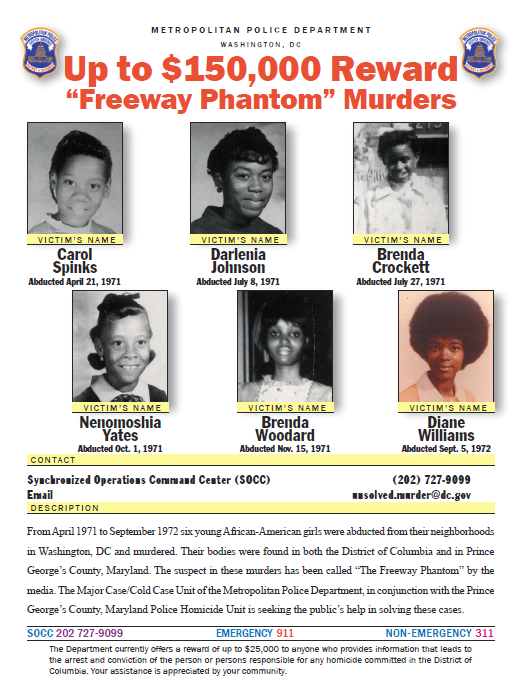
Reward poster appealing for information leading to the apprehension of the Freeway Phantom.

- Richard Montague (40), American philosopher and mathematician who was murdered on 7 March 1971, in Los Angeles, California in his own home by persons unknown. The murder remains unsolved.
- Jacinto Gutiérrez was a Puerto Rican AROTC cadet who was killed during a riot opposing his presence on the Río Piedras campus on 11 March 1971. Nobody has ever been charged in his killing.
- Two lieutenants in the U.S. Army were killed and another wounded on 15 March 1971 when an unidentified person threw a grenade into the officer's barracks at the Bien Hoa military base in Đồng Nai Province, Vietnam. The attack was believed to be targeting two other officers who were not present. Military prosecutors accused a black GI named Billy Dean Smith of the crime, but a court-martial found him not guilty and it was widely felt that he was being scapegoated due to his race and opposition to the war in Vietnam.
- Carol Denise Spinks (13) was the first known victim of an unidentified killer known as the Freeway Phantom. Spinks was abducted, sexually assaulted and murdered while walking home from a grocery store; her body was found six days later on an embankment behind Southeast Washington, D.C. alongside I-295.
- Detroit police believe the Hazelwood massacre, the largest mass murder in the city's history, in which eight people were shot in a house on the street of that name early on the morning of 14 June 1971, was a drug-related hit, but no suspects have ever been identified.
- Simonetta Ferrero (26) was found stabbed to death in a bathroom of the Catholic University of Milan, where she was a student on 24 July 1971.
- Colette Anise Wilson (13) disappeared from the Alvin Bus Stop on County Road 99 and Highway 6 in Alvin, Texas after she was dropped off by her band director on 17 June 1971. Wilson's body was found five months later on 26 November 1971, near the Addicks Reservoir. She had been shot in the head.
- Darlenia Denise Johnson (16) was the second known victim of the Freeway Phantom. Johnson was abducted while traveling to her summer job at a recreation center; her strangled body was discovered on 19 July just 15 feet (4.6 meters) from where victim Carol Spinks had been discovered two months previously.
- Brenda Kaye Jones (14) disappeared on 1 July 1971 from Galveston, Texas and was found dead the next day floating in the Pelican Island, located near to the Seawolf Parkway and close to Interstate Highway 45 after being killed.
- Brenda Crockett (10), American child from Northwest, Washington, D.C., did not arrive home on 27 July 1971, but she had called to say she would be arriving home as some man had her in his possession. She was found dead the next day after being murdered on U.S. Route 50, close to the Baltimore-Washington Parkway in Prince George's County, Maryland by a hitchhiker early in the morning.
- Six guards and two inmates were taken hostage during a riot at San Quentin State Prison, California on 21 August 1971. The riot was instigated by prisoner George Jackson, who was shot dead while trying to escape. Both inmates – John Lynn (29) and Ronald Kane (28) – and three of the guards – Paul Krasenes (52), Frank DeLeon (44), and Jere Graham (39) – were shot or stabbed to death by the attackers. Six prisoners, known as the San Quentin Six, stood trial for the crime; of those six, three were acquitted, two were convicted of assaulting the surviving hostages, and one was convicted of murdering DeLeon and Graham but had his conviction overturned on appeal. No-one was ever convicted of murdering Lynn, Kane, or Krasenes.
- Annette McGavigan was shot by a British soldier on September 6, 1971. No arrest or conviction has ever been brought.
- Lynn Eusan (22) was an American college student who became the first black woman to become the Homecoming queen at the University of Houston. On 10 September 1971, she was found stabbed to death in the back of a stranger's car. The man was charged, but acquitted, of her murder, and since then, it has remained unsolved.
- Wayne Joseph Dukette is believed to be the first victim of serial killer Randy Kraft. His body was discovered at the bottom of a ravine close to the Ortega Highway fifteen days after his 20 September 1971 disappearance. Due to advanced putrefaction, Dukette's cause of death was undetermined, although his high blood alcohol content indicated alcohol poisoning as a likely cause of his death.
- Nenomoshia Yates (12) was an American girl from Pennsylvania who on 1 October 1971 was kidnapped, strangled, and raped after leaving a Safeway store in the evening time. Yates was found dead just three hours later in Prince George's County, Maryland. Her killer is unknown.
- Debbie Catherine Ackerman and Maria Talbot Johnson (15), two American teenage girls, were last seen in Galveston, Texas getting into a man's truck on 15 November 1971. Two days later they were found dead near Texas City as they had been killed. Their murder remains unsolved.
- Gloria Ann Gonzales (19) was last seen alive near her apartment in Houston, Texas on 28 October 1971. On 23 November 1971, Gonzales's skeletal remains were found near Addicks Reservoir in the area where the body of 13-year-old Colette Anise Wilson was also found. Gonzales had died from blunt force trauma to the head.
- John Cochrane (67), Mary Gemmell (55), and William Jordan (31), three Ulster Protestant civilians, were killed in a bombing at the Red Lion Pub in Belfast on 2 November 1971. It is believed that a neighboring police station was the target. The bombing was attributed to members of the Provisional Irish Republican Army, and was one of many similar attacks perpetrated during the Troubles.
- 12-year-old Allison Anne Craven was reported missing by her mother on 9 November 1971, when she returned home to their apartment in Houston, Texas near Interstate 45 after completing shopping errands for one hour. Three months later, police found partial remains in a nearby field – two hands along with bones from an arm and some teeth. On 25 February 1972, the rest of Craven's skeleton was found in a Pearland, Texas field, also near Interstate 45 and ten miles from where she was last seen.
- Carmen Colón (10), Puerto Rican child who disappeared on 16 November 1971 from Rochester, New York after being kidnapped and was found dead two days later near the village of Churchville. Colón's killer is unknown.
- Edeltraud van Boxel (23) was a female German street sexworker from Münster who when getting into a car on 21 November 1971 at 8:30pm was kidnapped and found dead by a farmer on a dirt road at 11:40pm. She is believed to be a victim of a serial killer known as the "Münsterland Killer".
- A man claiming to be a Croatian nationalist called a Swedish newspaper to claim credit for the 26 January 1972 bombing of JAT Flight 367, over what was then Czechoslovakia on its way back to Yugoslavia from Denmark, which killed 27 of the 28 onboard (surviving flight attendant Vesna Vulović set the world record for longest fall survived without a parachute, at 10,160 metres [33,330 ft]). No suspects have been identified; some alternative theories have claimed the plane was actually shot down when it flew too close to a sensitive military facility, although the evidence largely supports the official finding that the plane was destroyed by an explosion at high altitude.
- Barbara Ann Derry (18) was a Vancouver, Washington, hitchhiker last seen alive on 11 February 1972. Derry is suspected of being a victim of serial killer Warren Forrest. Her body was discovered in Woodland on 29 March. Derry had died from a stab wound to her chest area.
- Joe Gallo (43) was shot to death in a Manhattan clamhouse on 7 April 1972, as part of a war between New York City Mafia families. The investigation identified no suspects, although Frank Sheeran claimed shortly before his death 31 years later that he was the lone gunman.
- On 20 April 1972, New York City police officer Philip Cardillo (32) died in the hospital of a gunshot wound inflicted six days earlier during an incident at a Harlem mosque. Another officer involved said he had seen one of the mosque's congregants, Louis 17X Dupree, standing over Cardillo with a gun pointed at his chest. Due to political complications resulting from the incident, suspects who had been in custody were not identified before being released, and evidence was not collected at the scene. The detective in charge of investigating the shooting later claimed interference from senior officers impeded his efforts and procedures were ignored. Two years later, Dupree's first trial, based largely on the testimony of an informant, resulted in a hung jury, and his second in an acquittal. He later served a prison sentence in North Carolina on drug charges and is currently in a Georgia prison on another charge. A later police informant in another case identified another suspect; he was never tried. Detectives who continue to investigate the case have complained that the FBI, which also had informants within the mosque, lied about what it knew in the past, and is still withholding relevant information.
- Maxwell Confait (26), a cross-dresser known as "Michelle", was found strangled to death on 22 April 1972, having been killed some time in the past three days. Three teenage boys were found guilty after making false confessions to the crime, but their convictions were quashed three years later.
- George Duncan (41) was an Australian law lecturer at the University of Adelaide who drowned on 10 May 1972, after being thrown into the River Torrens by a group of men believed to be police officers. Public outrage generated by the murder became the trigger for homosexual law reform, which led to South Australia becoming the first Australian state to decriminalize homosexuality. The murder remains unsolved.
- Barbara Storm (20) was a young German woman from Schüttorf who disappeared on 13 May 1972 was found dead on 17 May 1972 in a forest that was close to Schöppingen after being beaten and strangled. She is believed to have murdered by the "Münsterland Killer".
- Judith Roberts (14) was found battered to death near Tamworth, Staffordshire in England on 7 June 1972. She had been cycling along the lane next to where she was found. A man was wrongly convicted of her murder.
- Kerry May-Hardy (22) was abducted while hitchhiking from Capitol Hill, near Seattle on 24 June 1972. Her skeletal remains were discovered by construction workers buried close to a golf course in Roslyn on 6 September 2010. May-Hardy's murder has been linked to serial killer Ted Bundy, although he never confessed to her murder. Her partner is also considered a suspect in her murder.
- Parts of Dolores Della Penna's body were found in two separate South Jersey locations in July 1972. The 17-year-old had last been seen leaving her house in Tacony, Philadelphia on 11 July. Her fingertips had been removed from her hands to prevent fingerprint identification, and her head has never been found. In the mid-1990s, police identified several suspects, and claimed the motive had been revenge against her boyfriend for stealing drugs from some local dealers; however, most of them were deceased by that time, and the living ones were not charged. No other suspects have ever been identified.
- Thomas Eboli (61), acting boss of the Genovese crime family, was shot and killed as he walked from his girlfriend's house to his car in the Crown Heights section of Brooklyn, in the early hours of 16 July 1972. It has been speculated that he was killed over unpaid debts, but no one has ever been charged. His son, Louie "The Mooch" Eboli was transferred to the Chicago Outfit so he would not avenge his father's death.
- Jeannette DePalma (16) was found dead and was believed to have been killed on or around 7 August 1972 in Springfield Township, New Jersey.
- Diane Denise Williams (17) was a Ballou High School student, who after being seen boarding a bus on 5 September 1972 was found dead just a few hours later after being disposed of alongside I-295, which is south of the District line. Her killer is unknown.
- Jean McConville (38) was abducted in Belfast on 1 December 1972 by the Provisional Irish Republican Army after being falsely accused of being an informant for the British Army. The IRA officially admitted to killing her in 1999, though her body was not found until 2003 when a storm washed away the embankment she was buried in. IRA members Dolours Price and Brendan Hughes both later admitted involvement in the crime during an oral history project for Boston College (a fact which was not revealed until both were dead), accusing Gerry Adams and Ivor Bell of ordering McConville's death, but the authorities were unable to convict either as Price and Hughes' statements could not be used in court. Price and Hughes refused to name the actual killer, though journalist Patrick Radden Keefe later argued based on clues in Hughes' statement that it was Price's sister Marian.
- Sarah Ann Ottens (20) was raped and murdered on the University of Iowa campus on 14 March 1973. The crime is notable for having inspired fellow student Ana Mendieta to create the performance art exhibition Rape Scene in protest. James Wendell Hall was convicted of the crime, but his conviction was overturned in 1983 due to prosecutorial misconduct and prosecutors decided not to re-try him. Hall is currently serving a life sentence for the murder of another woman, Susan Hajek; he remains a suspect in Ottens' murder and prosecutors have said that he could be tried again if new evidence came to light (double jeopardy does not apply as Hall was never formally acquitted).
- Marian Beattie (18) was a young woman from Portadown, Northern Ireland who was last seen leaving a dance at Hadden's Garage with a man in the early hours of 31 March 1973 before being found dead a few hours later at the bottom of Hadden's Quarry near Aughnacloy, Co Tyrone. Her killing remains unsolved.
- Wanda Walkowicz (11), went missing from Rochester, New York on 2 April 1973, and she was found dead a day later after being murdered. Her killer is unknown.
- Major Coxson (45–46), whose first name was Benjamin, and who was also known as "The Maj", was an American drug kingpin from Philadelphia, Pennsylvania who was shot dead in his home on 8 June 1973 by unknown persons, and the murder remains unsolved.
- On 24 June 1973, thirty-two people were killed in an arson attack on the New Orleans gay bar known as the UpStairs Lounge. The bodies of four of the victims were never recovered as the police had disposed of them in an unmarked grave. The attack was the worst act of mass murder against the LGBT community in America until the Pulse nightclub shooting in 2016. Roger Dale Nunez was identified as the prime suspect, having allegedly confessed to people at the scene and in the following years that he started the fire, but police did not find his confessions reliable and he was never charged until his death by suicide in 1974.

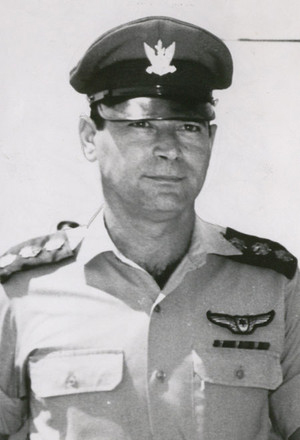
Yosef Alon

- Yosef Alon (43), a military attaché at the Israeli embassy in Washington, was shot fatally in his Chevy Chase driveway as he and his wife returned from a party shortly after midnight on 1 July 1973. The Palestinian Black September urban guerrilla claimed responsibility, in retaliation for the slaying of one its members by Israeli operatives, but officially the case remains unsolved.
- Marlies Hemmers (18) was a female German high school student who disappeared in Nordhorn on 6 August 1973. Her remains were found on 22 December 1973 across from a horse breeding ground in a small wood. Since her body had decayed, her cause of death could not be determined. It is believed she may have been murdered by the "Münsterland Killer".
- Brian McDermott (10) was a boy who went missing on 2 September 1973, in Belfast, Northern Ireland. His partly burned remains were found in a sack in the River Lagan a week later.
- Wendy Sewell (32) was beaten to death with a pickaxe handle in Bakewell graveyard, England on 12 September 1973. The graveyard groundskeeper Stephen Downing, who had been using the murder weapon to break up firewood that afternoon and was found covered in Sewell's blood (which had been spattered on his clothes when he discovered Sewell, who was still alive at the time), was convicted on the basis of a confession which was later found to have been coerced by police. He served 27 years in prison and had his conviction overturned in 2002. Derbyshire Police reinvestigated in 2005 but did not identify any new suspects.
- Debra Makel (8) of Rices Landing, Pennsylvania, was last seen alive on Friday, 5 October 1973, after disembarking from her school bus and walking up the driveway of her home; she was subsequently found two days later, having been sexually assaulted and strangled. Despite extensive subsequent detective work and interviews, authorities were unable to identify one or more specific suspects among a list of possible persons of interest. However, in the early 2000s, cold case detectives were able to obtain a DNA profile from evidence collected at the original crime scene; it has not yet yielded a match, but investigators continue to search for possible identifications and apply ongoing advances in DNA fingerprinting and other forensic technologies.
- Albert DeSalvo (42), a convicted serial rapist widely believed at the time to have been the Boston Strangler, was found stabbed to death in the infirmary at Walpole state prison on the morning of 25 November 1973. Charges brought against another inmate led to a mistrial when the jury deadlocked; no other suspects have ever been named.
- Michelle Maenza (11) was the final known victim of the Alphabet murders. Maenza disappeared while retrieving a purse left by her mother from a store within a shopping plaza close to her school on 26 November 1973. Her strangled body was found in a ditch in Macedon two days after her disappearance.
- On 20 December 1973, Chicago Outfit member Richard Cain (42) was shot to death by masked gunmen in a Chicago sandwich shop. The killers have never been identified.
- Jane Doe, a woman who American convicted serial killer Richard Laurence Marquette said he had killed in 1974 whose skeleton was shown to detectives by Marquette, excluded its head, whose identity remains unknown.
- Athalia Ponsell Lindsley (56), a former model and Broadway dancer, was fatally assaulted with a machete on the porch of her St. Augustine, Florida, home on 23 January 1974. The investigation centered on a neighbor she was having a dispute with at the time; he was tried and acquitted, due to mishandling of the evidence. No other suspects have been named. Later that same year, on 3 November Frances Bemis, a socialite friend of Lindsley's who had reportedly been conducting her own investigation of the murder, was found with her skull crushed in the neighborhood. That case also remains unsolved.
- The Dublin and Monaghan bombings occurred on 17 May 1974, when unidentified members of the Ulster Volunteer Force detonated three car bombs in Dublin city centre. Another bomb was detonated in Monaghan hours later, possibly as a distraction to allow the conspirators to flee the country. Thirty-three people were killed, making the attacks the deadliest terrorist incident in Irish history. A documentary broadcast in 1993 suggested that British security forces may have aided the UVF in the attack. These findings have been disputed, including by the UVF, which admitted its involvement but denied working with the British.
- Gloria Nadine Knutson (19) was a teenage American woman who went missing on disappeared on 31 May 1974 from Vancouver, Washington and was found dead in May 1978. She is very much believed to have been killed by suspected serial killer Warren Forrest, but this is not known for sure.
- Yana Yazova (62), a Bulgarian intellectual and writer critical of the contemporary communist regime, was found murdered in her apartment in Sofia in August 1974. Her manner of death is unclear, and the case remains unsolved.
- Brooks Bracewell (12) and Georgia Caroline Geer (14) were both last seen at the UtoteM convenience store off of Interstate 45 on 6 September 1974. Though some remains were discovered by police in Alvin, Texas in 1976, they remained unidentified until April 1981.
- Arlis Perry (19) was an American woman who went missing in Stanford, California on 11 October 1974 and was murdered on 12 October 1974 at the Stanford Memorial Church. Forty years later after the case was re-opened a suspect named Stephen Blake Crawford committed suicide to avoid being charged with the crime.
- Writer Donald Goines (37) and his wife Shirley Sailor were found shot dead in their Detroit apartment on 21 October 1974. No suspects have ever been identified.
- Frances Bemis (76), a female public relations specialist, was murdered in St. Augustine, Florida on 3 November 1974, by persons unknown. The murder remains unsolved.
- Betty Van Patter (52), bookkeeper for the Black Panther Party, was last seen leaving a San Francisco tavern on 13 December 1974. A few weeks later, her beaten corpse was pulled out of San Francisco Bay. It has been believed that members of the party were behind her death, as she had reportedly uncovered financial irregularities that pointed toward criminal activity, but authorities have never named any suspects.
- From 1975 to 1977, the dismembered remains of six unidentified men were found dumped in the Hudson River. The murders, named the Bag murders, have never been solved.
- On 5 February 1975, 3 boys were hiking in a park in Strongsville, Ohio when they discovered partial skeletal remains of Linda Pagano on the banks of Rocky River, now known as Mill Stream Run Reservation. The remains were heavily weathered, including missing the jawbone, and no physical evidence was recovered from the scene. It was determined that the remains belonged to a white female, and initial age estimates placed the remains at approximately 20 years old. The cause of death was ruled as a gunshot wound to the head, leading the case to be investigated as a homicide. Initially, attempts were made to link the bones to then-missing heiress Patty Hearst, who disappeared from California in 1974. At the time of its discovery, Micheal Pagano saw a TV broadcast about the unidentified body. Micheal called the Strongsville police with the theory that it might be Linda, but was dismissed, being told that the victim was too old and likely too tall. After the body continued to remain unidentified, the remains were interred in an unmarked grave at a potter's field at Memorial Gardens in Highland Hills. In June 2018 the remains were conclusively identified as Linda Pagano.
- A car bomb on 18 March 1975, in Lusaka, Zambia, killed Herbert Chitepo (51), the first black lawyer in the South African former apartheid state of Rhodesia, a bodyguard, and, later, Chitepo's neighbour. No suspects have ever been named. A 2001 investigation blamed infighting among members of the Zimbabwe African National Union (ZANU), which Chitepo had helped found, but a memoir by a former member of Rhodesian intelligence says instead that his agencies were behind it, and that they had planted evidence to implicate ZANU.
- Gold prospectors in southern Oregon discovered four decaying bodies near a creek in the Siskiyou Mountains on 12 April 1975; these were identified through dental records as the Cowden family of White City, who had disappeared from their campsite, where there was some evidence of a struggle, near Copper the previous year's Labor Day weekend. One of the original searchers said the bodies had not been where they were found; police find his story credible. Dwain Lee Little, of nearby Ruch, who was on parole from a previous rape and murder conviction at the time, and is currently serving consecutive life sentences for an attempted murder of a mother and her infant child, is considered a suspect due to circumstantial evidence, but it has not been enough to support charging him with the crime. True-crime writer Ann Rule's 2009 book about Little, But I Trusted You, goes into the case.
- Melanie Suzanne Cooley (18) vanished after leaving Nederland High School in Nederland, Colorado on 15 April 1975. Her body was discovered in Coal Creek Canyon on 2 May. She had been bludgeoned with a large rock and strangled. Cooley's murder has been tentatively linked to Ted Bundy, although her murder remains an open case.
- Harold Franks (59), a money order salesman working in Cleveland, Ohio, was shot dead in an armed robbery on 20 May 1975. Law enforcement and prosecutors soon brought a case against 3 local men without prior criminal records, largely based on the apparent witness testimony of Edward Vernon, 12-years-old at the time: Ricky Jackson, Kwame Ajamu (formerly Ronnie Bridgeman), and his brother Wiley Bridgeman. Jackson and the Bridgeman brothers were convicted and sentenced to death in the murder, but the convictions were subsequently overturned when decades later, Vernon recanted his statements and questions were raised about possible coercion of testimony and other procedural irregularities; the three men were freed, with Jackson having served 39 years, one of the longest ever terms for wrongful imprisonment. With the exonerations, the murder remains unsolved.
- Sam Giancana (67), a longtime leader of the Chicago Outfit, was shot and killed in his kitchen on 19 June 1975, shortly before he was to testify before a Senate subcommittee investigating possible CIA and Mafia collaboration in plots to assassinate John F. Kennedy over a decade earlier. This has led to much speculation as to who wanted him dead, with the actual shooter believed to be someone Giancana knew well. However, no charges have ever been brought in the case. It is speculated in mob circles that his murder was committed by his long time confidant Dominic "Butch" Blasi, as Giancana knew him for decades and was more than willing to let him inside his home.
- On 23 June 1975, the body of brothel keeper Shirley Finn was found shot dead in a parked car in South Perth, Australia. No suspects have ever been identified; the investigation is continuing.
- Julia Anna Garciacelay (19) was an American woman who went missing on 1 July 1975 from her home in North Melbourne, Victoria.
- Nancy Perry Baird (23) was a Layton, Utah gas station attendant who disappeared from her workplace on 4 July 1975. Her purse and money were found behind the counter and her car remained parked at the station. Baird's disappearance has been linked to Ted Bundy, although Bundy specifically denied involvement in this particular case prior to his execution.
- Barbara Colby (36) and James Kiernan (35), both American actors, were shot to death while walking to his car in Venice, California, on 24 July 1975. Colby died instantly, but Kiernan was able to describe the shooting to the police before he also died from his wounds. Kiernan said that the shooting occurred without reason or provocation, and said that there were two gunmen whom he did not recognize. There was no attempt at robbery, and the killers and their motivation remain unknown.
- Helen Bailey (8) was strangled to death in Birmingham, England on 10 August 1975. Police believe a man who made several confessions to the murder in 1978 and 1979 is responsible.
- Svante Grände (28), a Swedish aid-worker-turned guerilla fighter who fought against the regime of Augusto Pinochet, was killed by Argentine military officers in an ambush in Tucumán Province, Argentina on 14 October 1975. His killers were never identified.
- Vladimir Herzog (38), nicknamed "Vlado", was a Brazilian journalist, university professor and playwright of Croatian Jewish origin was a member of the Brazilian Communist Party and was active in the civil resistance movement against the Brazilian military government. On 25 October 1975, Herzog, then editor in chief of TV Cultura, was tortured to death by the political police of the military dictatorship, which later forged his suicide. Over 37 years later, his death certificate was revised to say that Herzog had, in fact, died as a result of torture by the army at DOI-CODI. His death cause remains unknown, and had a great impact on the Brazilian society, marking the beginning of the redemocratization process of the country.
- The 1975 LaGuardia Airport bombing occurred on the evening of 29 December 1975, at the TWA baggage claim at New York's LaGuardia Airport, killing 11. It has been suspected that Croatian nationalists were behind it, due to a similar bomb found at Grand Central Terminal a year later, but the group responsible for that event has denied responsibility for the earlier attack. Officially it remains unsolved.
- All 81 aboard died on 1 January 1976, when a bomb exploded on Middle East Airlines Flight 438. No suspects were ever identified.
- Joseph Barboza (43), a former operative with Boston's Patriarca crime family, was killed by four shotgun blasts at close range on 11 February 1976, while walking back to his car after visiting a friend's San Francisco apartment. It is believed that his killing was in retaliation for his testimony against members of the family at trials in the 1960s; however, no one has ever been charged.
- Between 15 February 1976 and 16 March 1977, four children – Mark Stebbins (12), Jill Robinson (12), Kristine Mehelich (10) and Timothy King (11) – were abducted and murdered in Oakland County, Michigan by the so-called Oakland County Child Killer. All four victims were asphyxiated, and both male victims were sodomized with a foreign object before their deaths. The case was re-opened in 2012 in the hope that DNA testing would identify the killer, but the DNA profile did not implicate any known suspect in the crimes.
- David Stack (18) was shot and killed somewhere near Wendover, Utah, on or about 9 June 1976, while hitchhiking from his home in Broomfield, Colorado, to visit relatives in California. His body was found in a landfill, and remained unidentified until 2015, when DNA and dental records verified that the body was his. The investigation is continuing now that his identity is known.
- Jim Leslie (38), a publicist and lobbyist for the government of Shreveport, Louisiana, was shot fatally in the parking lot of a Baton Rouge hotel on 9 July 1976, on his way to celebrate a legislative victory. Shreveport's public safety commissioner, George W. D'Artois, was charged with ordering the murder, but died before he could face trial. No one has ever been identified as the actual gunman.
- World War II German colonel Joachim Peiper (61), who led the troops responsible for the Malmédy massacre as a member of the Waffen-SS, was defending his home in Traves, Haute-Saône in eastern France, from unidentified vigilante attackers on the night of 14 July 1976, when he died of what is believed to have been smoke inhalation. His badly burned body was identified by a fellow veteran of the Wehrmacht who lived nearby; the circumstances of his death and autopsy have led to allegations that he faked it.
- Seewen murder case: five people were shot with a Winchester rifle during Pentecost weekend 1976 in a weekend house near the Swiss village Seewen. The main suspect, owner of a Winchester, was Carl Doser, who disappeared without a trace in 1977. The Winchester used for the crime was found in 1996 in Carl Doser's mother's former apartment. A witness came to police in 2013, saying that he met Doser in late 1990, Doser declared "he couldn't go back to Switzerland," as he was "being chased for murder". The murderer remains unknown.
- Priscilla Childers maintained to her 2001 death that her former husband, oil heir T. Cullen Davis, entered her house disguised with a wig on 2 August 1976, and fatally shot her 12-year-old daughter Andrea Wilborn, then ambushed her and her boyfriend Stan Farr as they returned home, also killing Farr. A judge had just granted her an increase in the support payments Davis owed her. He was indicted only in Wilborn's death, making him the wealthiest person to ever be tried for murder in the United States; at trial he was acquitted, although Farr's children settled a wrongful death suit they brought against him. A few years later, Davis was also tried and acquitted on charges he had conspired to have Childers and the judge murdered. Both cases have been the subject of books.
- Susanne Lindholm (25) was found raped and strangled in the basement of her Käpylä, Helsinki apartment building on 8 August 1976. Despite numerous tips over the years and several arrests, her murder remains unsolved. According to some of the investigating authorities, Lindholm could have been the victim of a yet-unidentified serial killer who committed similar killings in the city.

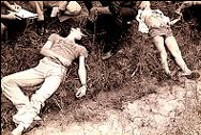
Sumter County Does crime scene

- Pamela Buckley and James Freund were shot to death in Sumter County, South Carolina on 9 August 1976. Although they were long unidentified, and referred to as the "Sumter County Does", they were identified on 19 January 2021. The case remains unsolved.
- Francis Jegou (65) was found stabbed to death in a park in Maidstone, England on 12 October 1976. Michael Stone, infamously convicted of the Russell murders, is the prime suspect in the case.
- Woodlawn Jane Doe is the name given to a female murder victim found on 12 September 1976, in Woodlawn, Baltimore County, Maryland. Her murderer remains unknown, but her identity was discovered in September 2021 when DNA evidence proved that she was Margaret Fetterolf, a 16-year-old girl who had run away from home in the summer of 1975.
- On 24 October 1976, the half-naked body of a teenage girl was found off the A12 motorway in Maarsbergen, Netherlands. The decedent, nicknamed the Heul Girl, is suspected to be a German kidnap victim who was supposedly disposed of by two unknown suspects. Her identity, and that of her killers, remain unknown.
- Aldo Vera Serafin (43), a high-ranking member of the Cuba's intelligence department under Fidel Castro who later defected to the United States, was shot to death on 26 October 1976 while on his way to meet an anti-Castro political group. His death has never been solved.
- Dallas police officer Robert W. Wood, 27, was fatally shot during a traffic stop in the early hours of 28 November 1976. Randall Dale Adams was initially convicted of the murder and almost executed. Errol Morris's 1988 documentary film The Thin Blue Line re-examined the case and suggested that another Texas inmate, David Harris, who had testified against Adams, was the more likely suspect after a taped statement from Harris at the end of the film that implicated him. Harris recanted his trial testimony at Adams' habeas corpus hearing, which resulted in the charges against Adams being dropped, freeing him. However, Harris never explicitly confessed to the crime before his own execution for another murder in 2004, leaving the killing officially unsolved.
- Beth Doe was the name given to an unidentified young woman who was found murdered on 20 December 1976, in White Haven, Pennsylvania. The brutality of the crime, the fact that she was pregnant when she was killed, and the length of time that she remained unidentified created national attention. Beth Doe was originally believed to have been an immigrant from a Central European country. In September 2019, a potential identity was announced as runaway Madelyn Cruz, last seen between 1974 and 1976, who may have been pregnant around the time of Beth Doe's murder. However, Cruz was later found to be alive, and in March 2021, it was confirmed that Beth Doe's identity was that of Puerto Rican 15-year-old Evelyn Colon. Currently, authorities suspect that the murderer was Colon's boyfriend at the time, Luis Sierra.
- The stabbing deaths of Suzanne Armstrong and Susan Bartlett occurred on 10 January 1977, in Collingwood, Victoria, Australia. These murders have been linked to the disappearance of a North Melbourne woman two years earlier. As of 19 September 2024 a man had been arrested in Italy in relation to the murders.
- Frank Bompensiero (71), a longtime Mafia contract killer, was himself shot and killed on 10 February 1977, while making a phone call in the Pacific Beach neighborhood of San Diego, California. Several defendants were arrested and charged with the killing. One died before trial, and the others were acquitted.
- Kamal Jumblatt (59), a Lebanese politician and founder of the Progressive Socialist Party, was gunned down by unknown assailants in Baakleen on 16 March 1977. Though some suspect the killers were members of the Ba'ath Party, nobody was ever arrested.
- Another Mafia assassin, Charles Nicoletti (60), was shot three times in the back of the head while waiting in his car outside a Northlake, Illinois, restaurant on 29 March 1977. No suspects were ever identified.
- Gordon Sanderson was found in a septic tank thirteen kilometers west of Tofield, Alberta on 13 April 1977. For over 44 years, he was an unidentified murder victim, going under the nickname 'Septic Tank Sam'. He was identified in January 2021, though his case remains unsolved.
- On 12 May 1977, Italian student Giorgiana Masi, a feminist activist and member of the Radical Party, was attending a sit-in in Rome when a scuffle broke out between the radical activists and law enforcement. Masi was killed in the process, having been shot with a .22-caliber gun, but her killer was never identified.
- On 13 May 1977, Mickey Spillane (42), head of the Westies, the last major Irish-American criminal organization in New York City, was killed outside of his Queens apartment. It is believed one of his underlings ordered the crime to take control of the organization from him, but police have never formally suspected anyone.
- Javier Ybarra Bergé (63), was a Basque industrialist, writer and politician from Bilbao, Spain. On 20 May 1977, Javier Ybarra was kidnapped by renegade members of the Basque separatist group ETA, who entered his home in disguise, bound and gagged members of his family, and took him away in an ambulance. The body of Javier Ybarra was found near a farmhouse on 22 June 1977, in Navarre. He had been shot in the head, and was wrapped in a plastic sheet. The murder remains unsolved.
- On the morning of 13 June 1977, the bodies of three young girls, beaten, strangled and raped, were found at Camp Scott, a Girl Scout camp near Locust Grove, Oklahoma. An escaped prisoner believed to have been involved was taken into custody; he later died after being returned to prison following his acquittal. No one else has ever been charged, although various other theories of the crime have been floated in the intervening years.
- Dragiša Kašiković (44) was a Bosnian Serb writer who was murdered along with his stepdaughter on 19 June 1977 in Chicago, Illinois by persons unknown. The murder remains unsolved.
- Donald Mackay (43), an Australian businessman and anti-drug campaigner, disappeared from a hotel car park and was murdered on 15 July 1977. His murder has never been solved.
- Laura Collins (26), American woman was found dead in a Los Angeles park named Griffith Park on 4 September 1977 after she had been strangled to death. Her murder remains unsolved.
- Carol Wilkinson (20) was beaten over the head while walking to work in Bradford, England on 10 October 1977. Peter Sutcliffe is a suspect in the case.
- Australian wallpaper designer Florence Broadhurst (78), was found bludgeoned to death in her Paddington studio on 15 October 1977. No one has ever been officially named as a suspect; speculation has ranged from serial killer John Wayne Glover to an acquaintance (the evidence suggests she knew her killer, and was familiar with the layout of her studio).
- Ray Ryan (73) was an American professional gambler, oilman, promoter and real estate developer. Described as having a larger-than-life personality, he mingled with prominent businesspeople and movie stars, as well as with cardsharps and mobsters on his path to fame and fortune. His murder case was never solved.
- South African National Party politician Robert Smit and his wife were found shot and stabbed in their home in a Pretoria suburb on 22 November 1977. The words "RAU TEM" were spray painted on the walls and cupboards of the house. Their meaning remains unknown, as does the identity of the perpetrators.
- On 28 December 1977 Karin Grech (15), of Malta, died of severe burns a half-hour after the wrapped package addressed to her father that she opened in the belief that it was a Christmas present exploded. Her father, the letterbomb's intended target, had been one of the few doctors at his hospital not on strike; another nonstriking doctor received that day a similarly rigged package that did not detonate. A connection to that package was investigated, but no suspects were identified. Later investigations have suggested some of Dr. Grech's students may have been responsible, and provided clues about the bombers. In 2010, a court ordered the Maltese government to compensate the Grech family for the loss of their daughter.
- On 7 January 1978, five teenage members of the neo-fascist group Italian Social Movement were ambushed and shot by unknown assailants, killing 13-year-old Franco Bigonzetti and 17-year-old Francesco Ciavatta. The murders sparked further violence and clashes with police, but the killers were never apprehended.
- On 8 January 1978, a shot through the window of his home in a suburb of the South African city of Durban killed anti-apartheid South African philosopher Rick Turner (35). An extensive investigation at the time turned up no suspects, and none have been named since, although it is widely believed that he was murdered by the security forces due to his activism.
- Fausto Tinelli and Lorenzo "Iaio" Iannucci were two male Italian left-wing activists who were shot dead on 18 March 1978 by unknown persons in Milan after a confrontation on the street. Their killer has never been found.
- Denise McGregor (12) was abducted on her way back from doing errands in the Melbourne suburb of Pascoe Vale on the evening of 20 March 1978. Her body was found the next day, raped, and with injuries so brutal, the pathologist likened them to those suffered by victims of plane crashes. Robert Arthur Selby Lowe, convicted of the 1991 murder of Sheree Beasley, was suspected until DNA evidence eliminated him. The case remains open.
- The Pemiscot County Does were found murdered on 17 June 1978. Although both were found in different states, they are believed to have been killed by the same person, as they were both seen together before their murders. Thirty-nine years later, they were identified as Jimmy Hendricks and Kim Mills, respectively; their murders remain unsolved.
- No arrests have ever been made in the 28 June 1978, Blackfriars Massacre, in which four mobsters and investigative journalist John A. Kelly were killed at a pub by that name in downtown Boston. The murders remain unsolved.
- Bob Crane (49), an American actor best known for his role in Hogan's Heroes, was discovered bludgeoned to death with a weapon that was never found (but was believed by police to be a camera tripod) at the Winfield Place Apartments in Scottsdale, Arizona, on 29 June 1978. Crane had allegedly called his friend John Henry Carpenter the night before to tell him their friendship was over. Crane was involved in the underground sexual scene and filmed his numerous escapades with the help of Carpenter, who was an audio-visual expert. Police reportedly found blood smears in Carpenter's car that matched Crane's blood type, but no charges were filed against Carpenter for more than a decade. When he was charged in 1994, he was acquitted. Carpenter maintained his innocence until his death in 1998, and the case is now officially cold.
- The so-called Bridgewater Four were convicted of the 19 September 1978 murder of Carl Bridgewater (13), a paperboy who was shot dead after apparently disturbing a burglary in Stourbridge; however, the convictions of the four men were quashed on appeal in 1997 after it was discovered that the suspect's confessions were coerced. Although another plausible suspect was identified, nobody else was charged with the crime.
- Nancy Spungen (20) was the American girlfriend of English Sex Pistols bassist Sid Vicious, and a figure of the 1970s punk rock scene. On 12 October 1978, Spungen was found dead in the bathroom of the couple's room, of a single stab wound to the abdomen. Her murder has never been solved.
- Margaret Frame (34) was a mother who disappeared while walking through Stanmer Park in Brighton, England on 12 October 1978. 10 days later her body was found in a shallow grave in the park. She had been struck over the head, stabbed through the heart and raped. Her killer had returned to the scene to move and bury her body. The murder occurred yards from where the infamous Babes in the Wood murders took place in 1986, and at his 2018 trial the perpetrator of those killings Russell Bishop revealed his father had been arrested for the Frame murder at the time, but not charged.
- Theresa Allore (19) was a Canadian college student who disappeared on 3 November 1978, from Champlain College Lennoxville in the Eastern Townships of Quebec. Five months later, on 13 April 1979, her body was discovered in a small body of water, approximately one kilometer from her dormitory residence in Compton, Quebec. An autopsy revealed there were no drugs in her system. She is believed to have been murdered by a man who is thought to have killed other women in the same area.
- The murders of four employees of the Burger Chef restaurant outside Speedway, Indiana, on 17 November 1978, have never been solved, despite extensive investigation.
- Ten guests, mostly visiting Canadians, died in a 26 November 1978 fire at a Holiday Inn in Greece, New York, outside Rochester. Investigators found that it was set deliberately, but were not able to make progress until 2014. After a three-year reinvestigation of the case, they announced they had one suspect, but did not identify that person.
- Kerry Graham and Francine Trimble disappeared on 16 December 1978, and were found dead on 9 July 1979. They remained unidentified for 36 years, and no suspects have been named in the case.
- Shortly after a private meeting with Cambodian dictator Pol Pot on 22 December 1978, British Marxist academic Malcolm Caldwell (47) was shot and killed by unknown assailants at the Phnom Penh guest house where he was staying with two Western journalists, the first allowed to visit the country since Pot's Khmer Rouge had taken power three years before. Three days later, Vietnam invaded Cambodia, forcing the Khmer Rouge from power and exposing their genocide, reports of which Caldwell had been one of the most forceful deniers of in the West. His killing is believed to have been an inside job, since he and his companions were under heavy guard the whole time they were in the country. It is believed that either Pot had him killed over a disagreement (although he reportedly returned from the meeting in very high spirits), or that anti-regime subversives did it in preparation for the Vietnamese invasion, to eliminate one of the Khmer Rouge's most passionate defenders abroad.
- On 6 January 1979, the bodies of the four Tan children were found in their family's apartment in the Singapore neighborhood of Geylang Bahru, stacked on top of each other after they had been extensively stabbed and slashed with a knife and chopper. Police believe the killer or killers had planned the crime for some time and knew the family, as a Chinese New Year card sent a month after the crime used personal nicknames, and seemed aware that the couple could not have more children. However, no suspects have ever been identified.
- Adolph Dubs (58), then U.S. ambassador to Afghanistan, who had been kidnapped by militants, was found to have been shot in the head at close range on 14 February 1979, after an abortive rescue attempt by Afghan police. The investigation of the crime was perfunctory; who the kidnappers were, and which of them killed Dubs, has never been determined. U.S. authorities came to believe that the Soviet KGB was behind the murder, and documents released from the Mitrokhin archive in the 1990s, after the Soviet Union collapsed, have lent some support to these allegations; the Soviets in turn accused the CIA of having done it to discredit them. In the wake of the killing, the U.S. began disengaging from Afghanistan, and more openly supporting opponents of the government, setting the stage for the Soviet invasion of the country later that year.
- Actor Victor Kilian (88) was beaten to death during a burglary of his Los Angeles home on 11 March 1979. No arrests have ever been made.
- Jean Perera Sinnappa (31), a Malaysian former beauty queen and schoolteacher who was murdered along a highway near Subang Airport on 6 April 1979. Her brother-in-law Karthigesu Sivapakiam (S. Karthigesu) was originally convicted of her murder and sentenced to death in 1980, but after filing an appeal, along with a key witness's confession to having framed him for the murder, Karthigesu was acquitted and set free in 1981; he died in 2023.
- Carlos Muñiz Varela (25), a Cuban refugee in Puerto Rico who supported independence movements on the island, was shot dead while driving to his mother's house in Guaynabo on 28 April 1979. A group calling itself Comando Cero took credit, but no arrests have ever been made. Documents released in 2012 by the FBI suggest that the Cuban exile Julio Labatud may have been involved.
- Doris Joanne Girtz, a 23-year-old woman previously known as "Perry County Jane Doe" was found on 20 June 1979, in Perry County, Pennsylvania. Isotope tests indicated that she may have originated in the Midwestern part of the country, or perhaps in Southern Canada. In the months preceding her death, she was thought to have spent time in the Southwest, and later died in Pennsylvania. Her true identity was determined by DNA testing in the summer of 2025. The cause of her death remains unknown.
- Alan Arthur Barnes (16) was found murdered at the South Para Reservoir near Adelaide on 24 June 1979, after being missing for five days. He appeared to have been tortured for several days before bleeding to death as a result of being sodomized with a large blunt object. Two months later, another victim, Neil Fredrick Muir (25), was found murdered at Port Adelaide, having been killed in the same fashion before being dissected and thrown into the Port River. These were the first two murders in a series of five which continued into the 1980s known as "The Family Murders", thought to have been committed by a group of four to twelve high-profile Australian men. One suspect, Bevan Spencer von Einem, was convicted of one of the 1980s murders and was also charged with the murder of Alan Barnes, but charges were withdrawn after key evidence was declared inadmissible. Von Einem remains the prime suspect in the murders of Barnes and Muir.

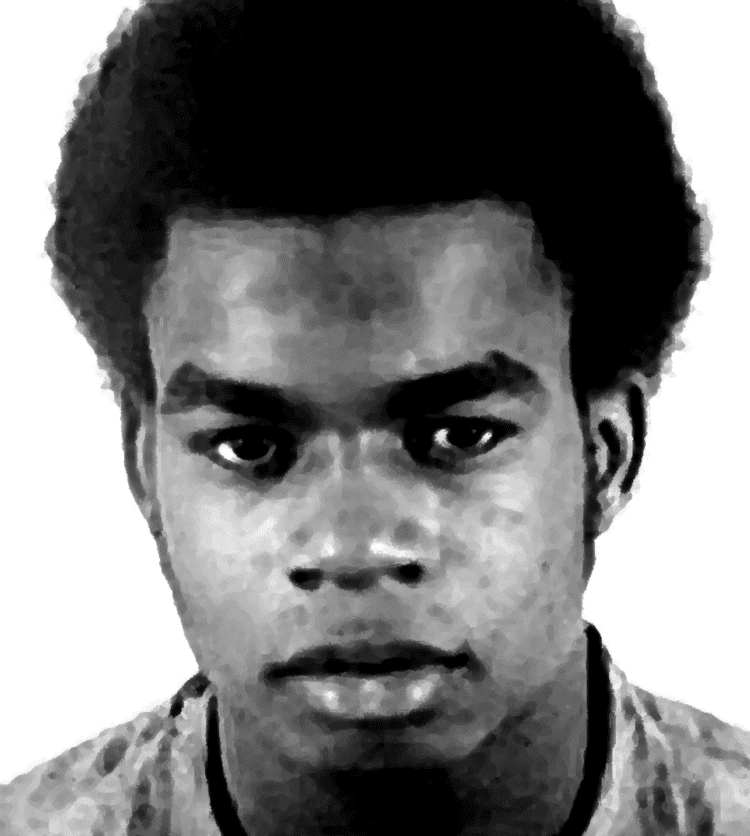
Raymond Washington, founder of the Crips, was shot to death on 9 August 1979.

- Raymond Washington (25), original founder of the South Central Los Angeles street gang who came to be known as the Crips, was murdered on 9 August 1979. Washington was shot dead when he walked up to a car on the corner of 64th and San Pedro streets in Los Angeles. At the time of his death, Washington no longer had any real control over the gang he founded. He wanted to unite warring gangs in peace, and had always opposed guns. Different theories exist on why he was killed, and who might have been involved, but no one was ever arrested for his murder.
- Gwenn Marie Story's body was found on 14 August 1979 in a parking lot in Las Vegas, Nevada. Previously known as "Sahara Sue," her body remained unidentified for 44 years until 19 December 2023.
- The Warrenpoint ambush occurred on 27 August 1979, when a British Army convoy was bombed at Narrow Water Castle in Northern Ireland, killing eighteen soldiers. The Provisional IRA South Armagh Brigade claimed responsibility. No-one has ever been criminally charged for the attack. One of the prime suspects was killed eleven years later when he accidentally blew himself up while attempting another bombing.
- Tammy Vincent's body remained unidentified for 31 years after she was found beaten, shot, stabbed and set afire after her death on a beach near Tiburon, California, on 26 September 1979. It was believed the 17-year-old runaway was a victim of Gary Ridgway, the "Green River Killer," although she likely died as she was due to testify in court against a pimp while in California.
- Cevat Yurdakul (37) was a prosecutor and the chief of police of Adana Province, Turkey, when he was assassinated on 28 September 1979. The murder remains unsolved.
- Debra Jackson (23), previously known only as "Orange Socks", was unknown until her 2019 identification through a DNA match with her sister, having been found murdered on 31 October 1979, in Georgetown, Texas. Henry Lee Lucas falsely confessed to her murder and was sentenced to death; his sentence was later commuted to life imprisonment, due to doubt over the veracity of his confession. Who was actually involved in Jackson's murder remains unknown.
- The body of Tammy Alexander (16), of Brooksville, Florida, was found in a cornfield off U.S. Route 20 in Caledonia, New York on 9 November 1979. She had been shot twice the night before. She remained unidentified, known as Caledonia Jane Doe or Cali Doe for over 35 years, until being identified via a DNA match with her sisters in 2015. Law enforcement in both states are continuing to investigate.
- Fleeta Drumgo (33), a former prisoner best known as one of the Soledad Brothers and San Quentin Six, was gunned down in Oakland, California on 24 November 1979. His murder was suspected to have been carried out by the Black Guerrilla Family, a prison gang of which he was a former member, after he offered the police information about the shooting of lawyer Fay Stender by a member of the gang.
- Cavit Orhan Tütengil (57–58) was a Turkish sociologist, writer and columnist, who was assassinated on 7 December 1979, by persons unknown. The murder remains unsolved.

== See also ==
- List of unsolved murders (before 1900)
- List of unsolved murders (1980–1999)
- List of unsolved murders (2000–present)
- Operation Identify Me
