= CWA Gold Dagger for Non-Fiction =

British literary award

CWA ALCS Gold Dagger for Non-Fiction
- Awarded for: Best non-fiction work on a crime-related theme
- Date: 6 July 2023
- Country: United Kingdom
- Presented by: Crime Writers' Association (CWA)
- First award: 1978; 48 years ago
- Website: thecwa.co.uk/awards-and-competitions/the-daggers/alcs-gold-dagger-for-non-fiction/

The CWA ALCS Gold Dagger for Non-Fiction also called the ALCS Gold Dagger for Non-Fiction is a British literary award established in 1978 by the Crime Writers' Association, who have awarded the CWA Gold Dagger for fiction since 1955. It is sponsored by the Authors' Licensing and Collecting Society, and is open to "any non-fiction work on a crime-related theme by an author of any nationality as long as the book was first published in the UK in English during the judging period." The prize is a cheque for £1,000 (reduced in 2009 from £2,000) and a decorative dagger.

In 1978 and 1979 only there was also a silver award. From 1995 to 2002 it was sponsored by The Macallan (Scotch whisky brand) and known as The Macallan Gold Dagger for Non-Fiction. In 2008 the award was sponsored by Owatonna Media (a London-based literary brand investor and owner). Between 2006 and 2010 it was awarded every other year, in even-numbered years, but in 2011 it returned as an annual award.

== Winners and shortlists ==
Award winners and shortlists
Year	Author	Title	Publisher	Result	Ref.
1978	Harry Hawkes	The Capture of the Black Panther		Winner (joint)	
1978	Audrey Williamson	The Mystery of the Princes		Winner (joint)	
1979	Jon Connell and Douglas Sutherland	Fraud		Winner (joint)	
1979	Shirley Green	Rachman		Winner (joint)	
1980	Anthony Summers and Robbyn Swan	Conspiracy		Winner	
1981	Jacobo Timerman	Prisoner Without a Name, Cell Without a Number		Winner	
1982	John Cornwell	Earth to Earth		Winner	
1983	Peter Watson	Double Dealer: How Five Art Dealers, Four Policemen, Three Picture Restorers, Two Auction Houses and a Journalist Plotted to Recover Some of the World's Most Beautiful Stolen Paintings		Winner	
1984	David Yallop	In God's Name		Winner	
1985	Brian Masters	Killing for Company		Winner	
1986	John Bryson	Evil Angels		Winner	
1987	Bernard Taylor and Stephen Knight	Perfect Murder		Winner	
1988	Bernard Wasserstein	The Secret Lives of Trebitsch Lincoln		Winner	
1989	Robert Lindsey	A Gathering of Saints: A True Story of Money, Murder and Deceit		Winner	
1990	Jonathan Goodman	The Passing of Starr Faithfull		Winner	
1991	John Bossy	Giordano Bruno and the Embassy Affair		Winner	
1992	Charles Nicholl	The Reckoning		Winner	
1993	Alexandra Artley	Murder in the Heart		Winner	
1994	David Canter	Criminal Shadows: Inside the Mind of the Serial Killer		Winner	
1995	Martin Beales	Dead Not Buried		Winner	
1996	Antonia Fraser	The Gunpowder Plot: Terror and Faith in 1605		Winner	
1997	Paul Britton	The Jigsaw Man (The Remarkable Career of Britain's Foremost Criminal Psychologist)		Winner	
1998	Gitta Sereny	Cries Unheard: Why Children Kill - The Story of Mary Bell		Winner	
1999 (Note: Eligibility: works published in the UK in English between 16 October 1998 and 15 September 1999. It carried a prize of £2,000.)	Brian Cathcart	The Case of Stephen Lawrence	Viking	Winner	
1999	Martin Booth	The Dragon Syndicates	Doubleday	Shortlist	
1999	Stuart S. Kind	The Sceptical Witness	Hodology Ltd.	Shortlist	
2000	Edward Bunker	Mr. Blue: Memoirs of a Renegade	No Exit Press	Winner	
2000	Andrew Motion	Wainewright the Poisoner	Faber and Faber	Shortlist	
2000	Errol Trzebinski	The Life and Death of Lord Errol	Fourth Estate	Shortlist	
2000	Tony Barnes	Richard Elias and Peter Walsh, Cocky	Milo Books	Shortlist	
2000	Tony Thompson	Bloggs 19	Warner Books	Shortlist	
2001	Philip Etienne and Martin Maynard, with Tony Thompson	The Infiltrators: the First Inside Account of Life Deep Undercover with Scotland Yard's Most Secret Unit	Penguin	Winner	
2001	Adrian Weale	Patriot Traitors: Roger Casement, John Amery and the Real Meaning of Treason	Viking Press	Shortlist	
2001	Zacaria Erzinçlioglu	Maggots, Murder and Men: Memories and Reflections of a Forensic Entomologist	Harley Books	Shortlist	
2002	Lillian Pizzichini	Dead Man's Wages: The Secrets of a London Conman and His Family	Picador	Winner	
2002	Julian Earwaker and Kathleen Becker	Scene of the Crime: a Guide to the Landscapes of British Detective FictionJudged to be outside the scope of the award but worthy of commendation	Aurum	Special mention	
2002	Don Hale, with Marika Huns and Hamish McGregor	Town Without Pity: the Fight to Clear Stephen Downing of the Bakewell Murder	Century	Shortlist	
2002	Miranda Carter	Anthony Blunt, His Lives	Macmillan	Shortlist	
2003	Samantha Weinberg	Pointing from the Grave: a True Story of Murder and DNA	Hamish Hamilton	Winner	
2003	Chandak Sengoopta	Imprint of the Raj: the Colonial Origin of Fingerprinting and its Voyage to Britain	Macmillan	Shortlist	
2003	Donald Thomas	An Underworld at War: Spivs, Deserters, Racketeers and Civilians in the Second World War	John Murray	Shortlist	
2003	Erik Larson	The Devil In The White City: Murder, Magic, and Madness at the Fair that Changed America	Doubleday	Shortlist	
2003	Michael Bilton	Wicked Beyond Belief: the Hunt for the Yorkshire Ripper	HarperCollins	Shortlist	
2003	Peter Walsh	Gang War: the Inside Story of the Manchester Gangs	Milo Books	Shortlist	
2004	John Dickie	Cosa Nostra: A History of the Sicilian Mafia	Hodder & Stoughton	Winner	
2004	Sarah Wise	The Italian Boy: Murder and Grave Robbery in 1830s London	Jonathan Cape	Winner	
2004	Mende Nazer and Damian Lewis	Slave: The True Story of a Girl's Lost Childhood and her Fight for Survival	Time Warner	Shortlist	
2004	Rebecca Gowers	The Swamp of Death: A True Tale of Victorian Lies and Murder	Hamish Hamilton	Shortlist	
2004	Steve Holland	The Trials of Hank Janson	Telos Publishing	Shortlist	
2005	Gregg and Gina Hill	On The Run: a Mafia childhood	Hutchinson	Winner	
2005	Bella Bathurst	The Wreckers: A Story of Killing Seas, False Lights, and Plundered Shipwrecks.	HarperCollins	Shortlist	
2005	Eric Jager	The Last Duel: A True Story of Crime, Scandal, and Trial by Combat in Medieval France	Century	Shortlist	
2005	James Owen	A Serpent in Eden: The Greatest Murder Mystery of All Time	Little, Brown	Shortlist	
2005	Sadakat Kadri	The Trial: a history from Socrates to O. J. Simpson	HarperCollins	Shortlist	
2006	Linda Rhodes, Lee Sheldon, and Kathryn Abnet	The Dagenham Murder: The Brutal Killing of PC George Clark, 1846 (The Borough of Barking and Dagenham)		Winner	
2006	Nuala O'Faolain	The Story of Chicago May	Michael Joseph	Shortlist	
2006	Sebastian Junger	A Death in Belmont	Fourth Estate	Shortlist	
2006	Sister Helen Prejean	The Death of Innocents: An Eyewitness Account of Wrongful Executions	Canterbury Press	Shortlist	
2006	Sue Williams	And Then the Darkness: The Fascinating Story of the Disappearance of Peter Falconio and the Trials of Joanne Lees	John Blake	Shortlist	
2006	William Queen	Under and Alone: The True Story of the Undercover Agent Who Infiltrated America's Most Violent Outlaw Motorcycle Gang	Mainstream	Shortlist	
2007	Not awarded. It was decided that the award was to become a biennial award.				
2008	Kester Aspden	Nationality: Wog - The Hounding of David Oluwale	Random House	Winner	
2008	David Rose	Violation: Justice, Race and Serial Murder in the Deep South	HarperPress	Shortlist	
2008	Duncan Staff	The Lost Boy	Bantam Press	Shortlist	
2008	Francisco Goldman	The Art of Political Murder: Who Killed Bishop Gerardi	Atlantic Books	Shortlist	
2008	Kate Summerscale	The Suspicions of Mr Whicher The Murder at Road Hill House	Bloomsbury	Shortlist	
2008	Peter Zimonjic	Into the Darkness: 7/7	Vintage Books	Shortlist	
2009	Not awarded as award had become biennial.				
2010 (Note: Eligibility: works published between June 1, 2008 and May 31, 2010)	Ruth Dudley Edwards	Aftermath: The Omagh Bombing & the Families' Pursuit of Justice	Harvill Secker	Winner	
2010	Alex McBride	Defending the Guilty	Penguin / Viking	Shortlist	
2010	David R. Dow	Killing Time	Heinemann	Shortlist	
2010	David Cesarani	Major Farran's Hat	Heinemann	Shortlist	
2010	Douglas Preston, with Mario Spezi	The Monster of Florence: A True Story	Virgin / Random House	Shortlist	
2010	Jeff Guinn	The True, Untold Story of Bonnie & Clyde	Simon & Schuster	Shortlist	
2011 (Note: Eligibility: works first published in the UK in English between 1 June 2010 and 31 May 2011. The award became an annual fixture once again, but this year the prize fund was halved to £1000.)	Douglas Starr	The Killer of Little Shepherds	Simon & Schuster	Winner	
2011	Colin Evans	Slaughter on a Snowy Morn	Icon Books	Shortlist	
2011	Judith Flanders	The Invention of Murder	HarperCollins	Shortlist	
2011	Kate Colquhoun	Mr Briggs' Hat	Little, Brown	Shortlist	
2011	Michael Capuzzo	The Murder Room	Michael Joseph	Shortlist	
2012	Anthony Summers and Robbyn Swan	The Eleventh Day	Transworld	Winner	
2012	Ben Lopez	The Negotiator	Little, Brown	Highly commended	
2012	David Smith with Carol Ann Lee	Witness	Mainstream	Shortlist	
2012	Gavin Knight	Hood Rat	Pan Macmillan	Shortlist	
2012	Leaf Fielding	To Live Outside the Law	Serpent's Tail	Shortlist	
2012	Misha Glenny	Dark Market	Vintage	Shortlist	
2013	Paul French	Midnight in Peking	Penguin / Viking	Winner	
2013	Richard Hoskins	The Boy in the River	Pan Macmillan	Highly commended	
2013	Carol Ann Lee	A Fine Day for a Hanging	Mainstream	Shortlist	
2013	Clive Stafford Smith	Injustice: Life and Death in the Courtrooms of America	Random House	Shortlist	
2013	Diana Souhami	Murder at Wrotham Hill	Quercus	Shortlist	
2013	Mukesh Kapila with Damien Lewis	Against a Tide of Evil	Mainstream	Shortlist	
2014	Adrian Levy and Cathy Scott-Clark	The Siege	Viking	Winner	
2014	Damien Echols	Life After Death: Eighteen Years on Death Row	Atlantic Books	Shortlist	
2014	Jeff Guinn	Manson	Simon & Schuster	Shortlist	
2014	Kate Colqhoun	Did She Kill Him?	Little, Brown Book Group	Shortlist	
2014	Paul Lewis and Rob Evans	Undercover: The True Story of Britain's Secret Police	Faber and Faber	Shortlist	
2014	Samantha Geimer	The Girl	Simon & Schuster	Shortlist	
2015	Dan Davies	In Plain Sight: The Life and Lies of Jimmy Savile	Quercus	Winner	
2015	Ǻsne Seierstad	One of Us: The Story of Anders Breivik and the Massacre in Norway	Virago	Shortlist	
2015	Bryan Stevenson	Just Mercy: a story of justice and redemption	Scribe	Shortlist	
2015	Iain Overton	Gun Baby Gun: A Bloody Journey Into the World of the Gun	Canongate	Shortlist	
2015	Jill Leovy	Ghettoside: Investigating a Homicide Epidemic	Bodley Head	Shortlist	
2015	Paul Fischer	A Kim Jong il Production	Penguin	Shortlist	
2016	Andrew Hankinson	You Could Do Something Amazing With Your Life [You Are Raoul Moat]	Scribe	Winner	
2016	Adam Sisman	John le Carré: The Biography	Bloomsbury	Shortlist	
2016	Luke Harding	A Very Expensive Poison	Faber and Faber	Shortlist	
2016	Martin Edwards	The Golden Age of Murder	HarperCollins	Shortlist	
2016	Thomas Grant	Jeremy Hutchinson’s Case Histories	John Murray	Shortlist	
2016	Wensley Clarkson	Sexy Beasts: The Hatton Garden Mob	Quercus	Shortlist	
2017	Stephen Purvis	Close but No Cigar: A True Story of Prison Life in Castro's Cuba	Weidenfeld & Nicolson	Winner	
2017	A. T. Williams	A Passing Fury: Searching for Justice at the End of World War II	Jonathan Cape	Shortlist	
2017	Anja Reich-Osang	The Scholl Case: The Deadly End of a Marriage	Text Publishing	Shortlist	
2017	Gary Younge	Another Day in the Death of America	Guardian / Faber and Faber	Shortlist	
2017	Kate Summerscale	The Wicked Boy: The Mystery of a Victorian Child Murderer	Bloomsbury	Shortlist	
2017	Simon Farquhar	A Dangerous Place	The History Press	Shortlist	
2018	Thomas Harding	Blood on the Page	William Heinemann	Winner	
2018	Alexandria Mariano-Lesnevich	The Fact of a Body	Macmillan	Shortlist	
2018	David Grann	Killers of the Flower Moon	Simon & Schuster	Shortlist	
2018	Laura Thompson	Rex v Edith Thompson	Head of Zeus	Shortlist	
2018	Piu Eatwell	Black Dahlia Red Rose	Coronet	Shortlist	
2018	T. Christian Miller and Ken Armstrong	A False Report	Hutchinson	Shortlist	
2019	Ben MacIntyre	The Spy and the Traitor	Viking	Winner	
2019	Claire Harman	Murder by the Book	Viking	Shortlist	
2019	Hallie Rubenhold	The Five	Doubleday	Shortlist	
2019	Kirk Wallace Johnson	The Feather Thief	Hutchinson	Shortlist	
2019	Mikita Brottman	An Unexplained Death	Canongate	Shortlist	
2019	Sue Black	All That Remains	Doubleday	Shortlist	
2020	Casey Cep	Furious Hours: Murder, Fraud and the Last Trial of Harper Lee	William Heinemann	Winner	
2020	Adam Sisman	The Professor and the Parson	Profile Books	Shortlist	
2020	Caroline Goode	Honour: Achieving Justice for Banaz Mahmod	Oneworld Publications	Shortlist	
2020	Peter Everett	Corrupt Bodies	Icon Books	Shortlist	
2020	Sean O'Connor	The Fatal Passion of Alma Rattenbury	Simon & Schuster	Shortlist	
2020	Susannah Stapleton	The Adventures of Maud West, Lady Detective	Picador	Shortlist	
2021	Sue Black	Written in Bone	Doubleday, Penguin	Winner	
2021	Andrew Harding	These Are Not Gentle People	MacLehose	Shortlist	
2021	Becky Cooper	We Keep the Dead Close	William Heinemann, Penguin	Shortlist	
2021	Ben MacIntyre	Agent Sonya	Viking, Penguin	Shortlist	
2021	Debora Harding	Dancing with the Octopus	Profile Books	Shortlist	
2021	Nick Hayes	The Book of Trespass	Bloomsbury	Shortlist	
2022	Julia Laite	The Disappearance of Lydia Harvey: A True Story of Sex, Crime and the Meaning of Justice	Profile Books	Winner	
2022	Ben Machell	The Unusual Suspect	Canongate	Shortlist	
2022	Gwen Adshead	The Devil You Know	Faber and Faber	Shortlist	
2022	Julie Kavanagh	The Irish Assassins	Atlantic Books; Grove Press UK	Shortlist	
2022	Patrick Radden Keefe	Empire of Pain	Pan Macmillan; Picador	Shortlist	
2022	Thomas Morris	The Dublin Railway Murder	Penguin Random House; Harvill Secker	Shortlist	
2023	Wendy Joseph	Unlawful Killings: Life, Love and Murder: Trials at the Old Bailey	Transworld	Winner	
2023	Amit Katwala	Tremors in the Blood	HarperCollins	Shortlist	
2023	David Whitehouse	About a Son	Orion Publishing Group	Shortlist	
2023	Julie Mackay	To Hunt a Killer	HarperCollins	Shortlist	
2023	Martin Edwards	The Life of Crime	HarperCollins	Shortlist	
2023	Stephen Bates	The Poisonous Solicitor	Icon Books	Shortlist	
2024	Nicholas Shakespeare	Ian Fleming: The Complete Man	Vintage	Winner	
2024	Michael Finkel	The Art Thief	Simon & Schuster	Shortlist	
2024	Matt Johnson with John Murray	No Ordinary Day	Ad Lib Publishers	Shortlist	
2024	Jennifer McAdam with Douglas Thompson	Devil’s Coin	Ad Lib Publishers	Shortlist	
2024	Alex Mar	Seventy Times Seven	Bedford Square Publishers	Shortlist	
2024	Jennifer Robinson and Keina Yoshida	How Many More Women?	Endeavor	Shortlist	
2025	Kate Summerscale	The Peepshow: The Murders at 10 Rillington Place	Bloomsbury	Winner	
2025	Duncan Harding	The Criminal Mind	Penguin - Michael Joseph	Shortlist	
2025	Henry Hemming	Four Shots in the Night	Quercus	Shortlist	
2025	Jeremy Craddock	The Lady in the Lake	Mirror Books	Shortlist	
2025	John Grisham and Jim McCloskey	Framed	Hodder & Stoughton	Shortlist	
2025	Jonathan Coffey and Judith Moritz	Unmasking Lucy Letby	Orion Publishing Group - Seven Dials	Shortlist	
