= Sisman =

Sisman is a surname. Notable people with the surname include:

- Adam Sisman (born 1954), British writer, editor and biographer
- Elaine Sisman (born 1952), American musicologist
- Robyn Sisman (1949–2016), British publisher and author
