= E. T. C. Werner =

British diplomat and sinologist (1864–1954)

Edward Theodore Chalmers Werner (1864–1954) was a British diplomat in Qing Dynasty China and sinologist specialising in superstition, myths and magic in China.

== Early life ==
E.T.C. Werner was born at Port Chalmers, Dunedin, New Zealand. His father was Prussian and his mother English. He was educated at Tonbridge School. His father died in 1878 and E.T.C. had to find a career. He passed the entrance exams to the Far Eastern Cadetship.

== Diplomatic career ==
Werner arrived in Peking in the 1880s attached to the British Legation as a student interpreter. Werner remained in the British consular service in China until 1914 serving in postings including time working in the Chancery at the Peking Legation, then a year in Canton (Guangzhou), two in Tientsin (Tianjin) and another couple in Macao. He later spent a year in Hangchow (Hangzhou), one in the Pagoda Anchorage (Mawei), a year in the isolated Kiungchow (Qiongshan) on Hainan Island in 1900, a couple of years on the Gulf of Tonkin in the remote posting of Pakhoi (Beihai) before being posted to Kongmoon (Jiangmen). Promotion saw Werner Consul at the busy tea port of Kiukiang (Jiujiang), serving for four years. In 1911 Werner became British Consul-General in Foochow (Fuzhou). He left the consular service in 1914.

== Contributions to Sinology ==
After retirement Werner moved back to Peking where he concentrated on his Sinological studies. He was a member of the planning committee of the Peking Union Medical College, a lecturer at Peking University, member of the Chinese government's Historiography Bureau and a member of the Royal Asiatic Society.

== Personal life ==
E.T.C. Werner was married to Gladys Nina Ravenshaw (1886–1922) in 1911 in Hong Kong. Gladys was the daughter of Lieutenant-Colonel Charles Withers Ravenshaw, the former British Resident in Nepal. In 1919 the couple adopted a baby daughter, Pamela, in Peking. Between 1943 and 1945 E.T.C. Werner was interned by the Japanese at the Weihsien Internment Camp, The Weihsien Compound, in Shandong.

Pamela was murdered in January 1937, a crime that has never been solved. In 2011, the British author Paul French, an expatriate living in China, published a study of the murder, Midnight in Peking, which explores the career and character of Werner and offers a solution to the mystery. A TV adaptation of the book is currently being produced by Kudos with a script by Richard Warlow (creator, writer and show runner of the BBC Television and Amazon Prime series Ripper Street. Jonathan Spence, in a review of the book, speculates that part of the reason that the crime was not solved was that Werner made "a self-insulating cult of his loneliness. It may indeed have been true that he disliked most people he met, and that he made no attempt to conceal it." He adds that Werner was "not the kind of man who made people want to help when he was in trouble. He infuriated the British, failed to get in close touch with the Chinese officers assigned to the case, gave his own contradictory press conferences on the steps of the regional substation, and rooted around the probable crime scenes without permission."

== Selected bibliography ==
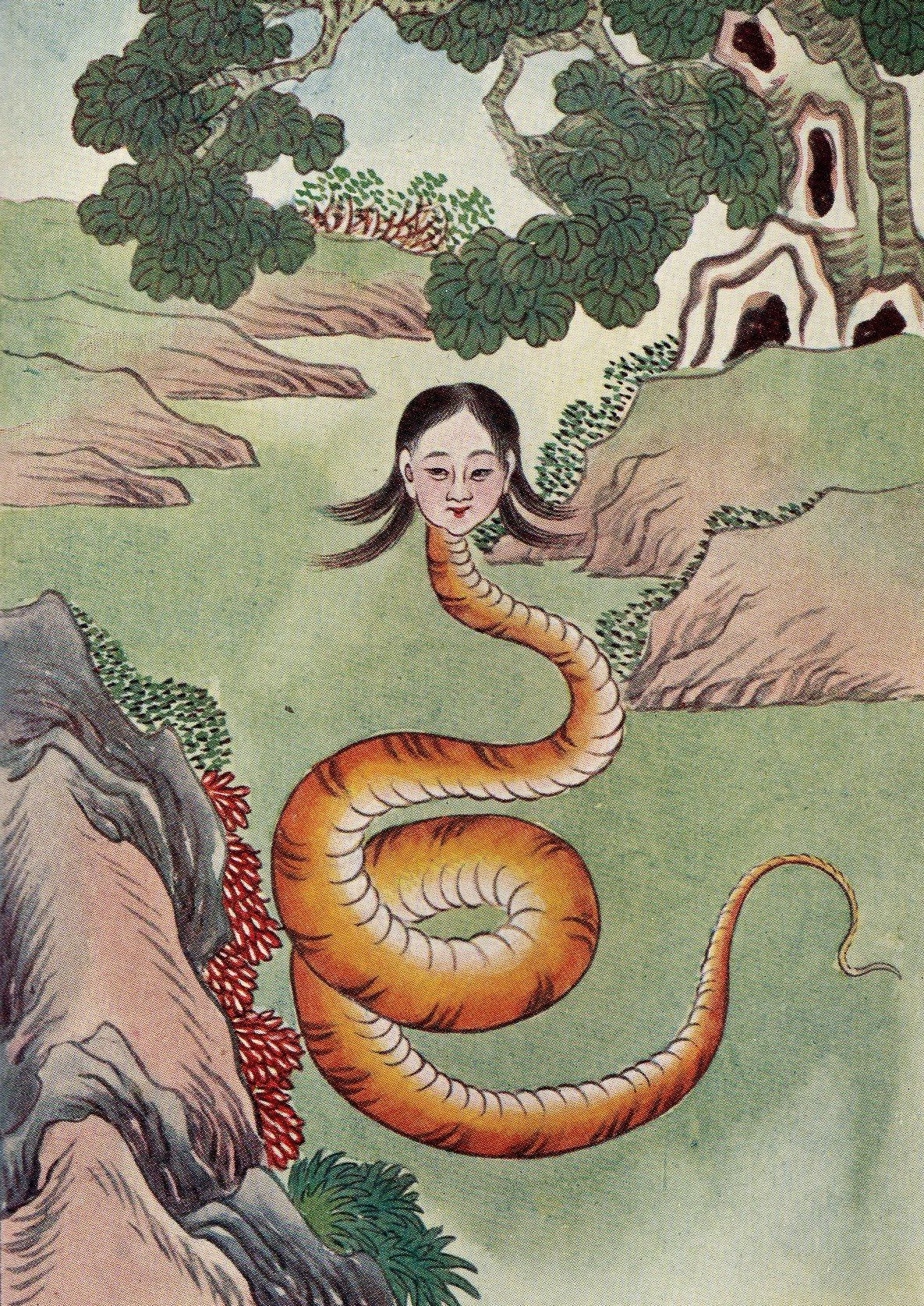
An illustration from "Myths and Legends of China, 1922"

- China of the Chinese, 1919
- Werner, E. T. C. (1922). Myths & Legends of China. New York: George G. Harrap & Co. Ltd. (Project Gutenberg eText.)
- Chinese Ditties (1922)
- Dictionary of Chinese Mythology (1932)
- Weapons of China (1932)
- Memorigrams(Yeovil 1948)
