= Murder of Pamela Werner =

Unsolved murder of young Englishwoman in 1937 Beijing

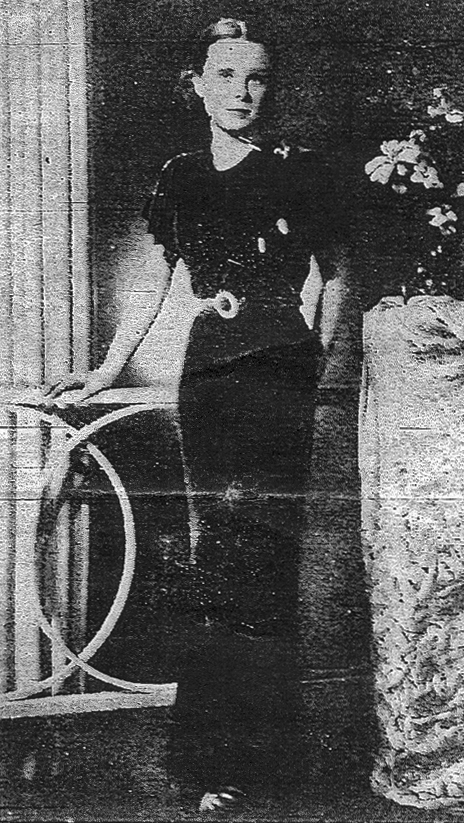
- Studio photograph of Pamela Werner taken in 1936, a month before her death
- Date: 8 January 1937
- Location: Beijing, China
- Coroner: Nicholas Fitzmaurice
- Accused: Wentworth Prentice

On the morning of 8 January 1937, the severely mutilated body of Pamela Werner (believed born 7 February 1917) was found near the Fox Tower in Beijing, China, just outside the city's Legation Quarter. The only child of sinologist and retired British diplomat E. T. C. Werner, Pamela had last been seen by acquaintances just before leaving a skating rink the previous night. No one was ever charged in the case.

Though British and Chinese officials cooperated in the investigation, it was hampered by official resistance and the city's general chaos: Beijing at the time was crowded with war refugees, there was upheaval elsewhere in China and Europe, and Japanese troops were on the verge of occupying the city. Investigators focused on some members of the city's expatriate community, but the case was officially closed with the finding that the mutilation suggested a Chinese killer, before they could be sure of any suspects; the Japanese occupation foreclosed any further efforts to reopen it. Some British diplomatic records pertaining to the case were later weeded; Werner, whose chequered career with the Diplomatic Service in China had alienated many of his former colleagues who oversaw the investigation, later used his own resources to identify American dentist Wentworth Prentice as the likely killer.

A subject of considerable media attention at the time, the case drifted into obscurity with the ensuing outbreak of the Second Sino-Japanese War, which soon enveloped into World War II, and the Communist victory in the Chinese Civil War leading to the establishment of the People's Republic of China a short time afterwards. Interest in the case was revived with the 2011 publication of Paul French's bestseller Midnight in Peking, which endorsed Werner's conclusions and won several awards. However, a website set up by some of Prentice's descendants argues that documentary evidence from the time contradicts that conclusion and casts doubt on many of French's assertions.

== Background ==
=== Beijing in the late 1930s ===
At the start of 1937, Beijing (then romanized in Western languages as "Peking") and its 1.5 million residents, both Chinese and foreign, knew that they were living at the end of an era. While the city was the third richest in the Republic of China, it was no longer the country's capital. Despite the success of the Northern Expedition, Kuomintang leader Chiang Kai-shek had retreated to Nanjing. Originally Chiang's aim was to better consolidate his political power and military position against Mao Zedong's Chinese Red Army, which sought to establish a communist state; but after the December 1936 Xi'an incident, where Zhang Xueliang had held him hostage for two weeks, he had agreed to Zhang's demand that he seek an alliance with the PLA to better defend China against the Japanese empire.

Chiang had left General Song Zheyuan in charge of Beijing, to do what he could to hold off both the northern warlords who still remained and, increasingly, the Imperial Japanese Army (IJA), who were camped within a few miles of the onetime Chinese imperial palace, the Forbidden City, and controlled almost all the routes in and out of the city. Planning to use Beijing as a base for their eventual conquest of China, the Japanese were working to undermine the city's resistance. They covertly encouraged the drug trade and staged regular military provocations. Chinese residents of Beijing believed that Chiang was prepared to abandon the city to the Japanese if he could be assured of retaining all of China south of the Yangzi River. "The end was coming," Paul French wrote in 2011, "it was just a question of when." Many residents assumed that that end would be death at Japanese hands, either by starvation as they besieged the city or by being massacred afterwards.

Beijing's population had swelled as refugees flocked to the city. Many were Chinese, fleeing the wars and disruption elsewhere in the country. But a sizable portion had come from Europe, primarily Russian Whites, left stateless by the communist victory in the Russian Civil War and the subsequent establishment of the Soviet Union. Others were Jews, leaving behind the worsening conditions in Nazi Germany and elsewhere in Europe, joined by those who also felt at risk from the advancing tide of fascism. They were joined by military deserters evading capture, fugitives from justice in their homelands and travellers who had either been stranded in China or decided to stay. Most of the European refugees had come to China penniless and worked menial jobs, or sometimes engaged in criminal activity, to get by.

Beijing's foreign diplomats and businessmen looked down on the European refugees as a threat to their hegemony in the city and hoped they would eventually find their way to Shanghai. They were sometimes joined in this assessment by the expatriates, many of them businessmen who dealt with the Chinese, or those who had moved to China for better economic prospects serving the expatriate community. The disparate exchange rate between strong Western currencies and the Chinese silver dollar, as well as lower costs of living in China, made it possible for expatriates to live better than they could in their native countries for the same amount of money. For example, American journalist Edgar Snow and his wife Helen were able to own a racehorse on their earnings as reporters.

=== The Werners ===
Edward Theodore Chalmers Werner was a New Zealand-born British citizen whose wealthy Prussian father took the family travelling around the world in his youth. He had returned to England to attend Tonbridge School. Due to his father's death in his teens, Werner had to find employment after finishing and, after passing the Foreign Office's cadet exam, he was sent to Beijing to learn Chinese.

Werner took readily to the country's language and culture, which he studied avidly while serving the Diplomatic Service in a variety of positions over the next decades, including at one point as consul. However, his interest in the country where he served was coupled with poor personal skills and many of his postings were of remote locations, meant as punishments for volatile disagreements with superiors and sometimes those the consular officers served. Nevertheless, Werner married a socially prominent woman, Gladys Ravenshaw, and the couple stayed in Beijing after his 1914 retirement, where he continued his studies.

In 1919 the Werners adopted a two-year-old girl, whom they named Pamela, from the orphanage run by Portuguese nuns at the Cathedral of the Immaculate Conception, or South Church, in Beijing. Pamela's biological parentage was not known, although her fair complexion and grey eyes suggest that she was, like many of the other orphans at the South Church, the offspring of exiled Russian Whites. After Gladys died of what was said to have been a drug overdose while being treated for meningitis in 1922, Werner devoted much of his life to Pamela, teaching her Chinese to the point that she was fluent from a very early age; later she would emulate her father by travelling around the city on her bicycle, often unaccompanied. Outside the home, Werner wrote books and articles about China, researched the language and its many dialects on long walks around Beijing, and occasionally lectured at Peking University.

The Werners lived, like a growing number of foreigners, outside the city's heavily secured Legation Quarter, a cramped area of about 1.3 square kilometres (0.50 sq mi) that was the only extraterritorial portion of the city, in contrast to the more populous treaty ports of Shanghai and Tianjin (then romanized as "Tientsin"). Among their neighbours in the hutong where they lived in a modernized siheyuan, or courtyard house, were the Snows. Werner sent Pamela to the private schools that catered to the city's more affluent foreigners.

At the end of 1936, Pamela was on holiday from Tientsin Grammar School. In the wake of some incidents there that may possibly have involved Sydney Yeates, the school's headmaster, making sexual overtures to her, Werner was preparing to send his daughter back to England to continue her education, a move Pamela did not welcome. Werner feared his growing daughter was maintaining too active a social life for a woman her age and was also worried about some of the young men who had attempted to court her. He had hit one of them, a young Chinese man, with his cane in front of the house during a confrontation.

== Disappearance and death ==
On 7 January 1937, the last day of her life, Pamela went to a dental appointment in the morning and then returned home to write letters. She left the family home in the late afternoon. Ho Ying, a servant who typically went out to purchase food around 3 p.m. daily, informed her at the time he was doing so and asked her if, as was often the case, she wanted him to buy sweetmeats when he did so. Pamela declined, saying she herself would be leaving within the hour, although she indicated she would return by 7:30 for dinner, asking Ho to prepare meatballs and rice. When he returned she was gone; the family's gatekeeper had seen her leave with her bicycle.

After leaving, Pamela met friend Ethel Gurevitch, a daughter of Russian émigrés whom she had known for five years, at the Wagons-Lits Hotel, a popular gathering place for the city's foreign community, per an agreement the two had made the day before; Pamela told Gurevitch she had been there earlier and left briefly before returning to meet her. Afterwards, they went back to the Gurevitch home where Ethel's mother served the two tea, buttered bread and cake; Pamela ate very little, saying she was not hungry.

Pamela and Gurevitch then went out to an ice skating rink operated by a French company, arriving around 6 p.m., where they skated with a third friend, Lillian Marinovski, another Russian. The three remained together for most of the time they were there except for one brief period when Pamela went to speak to another girl. Around 7:30 p.m. Gurevitch recalled that Pamela said she had to go home for dinner. They asked her if she felt comfortable returning home alone at night; she told them she always went by herself and that "nothing can happen to me here in Peking." Marinvoski saw her bicycle away, with her skates over her shoulder. It was the last time anyone is known to have seen Pamela alive.

By 8 p.m. Pamela had still not returned home; although her father had. Around 10:30 p.m. he asked Ho to go to the skating rink and see if she was there; by the time he arrived, the rink had closed and workers were cleaning up for the evening. They could not tell him anything specifically about Pamela as, they said, there had been around 200 people skating at the rink over the course of the evening. Ho returned to the Werner residence, where E. T. C. told him to go home for the night. By the older man's later testimony, he went out himself with an electric torch to look for his daughter, returning at 1 a.m. and going to bed; later he would claim he had spent most of the night looking for her.

=== Discovery of body ===
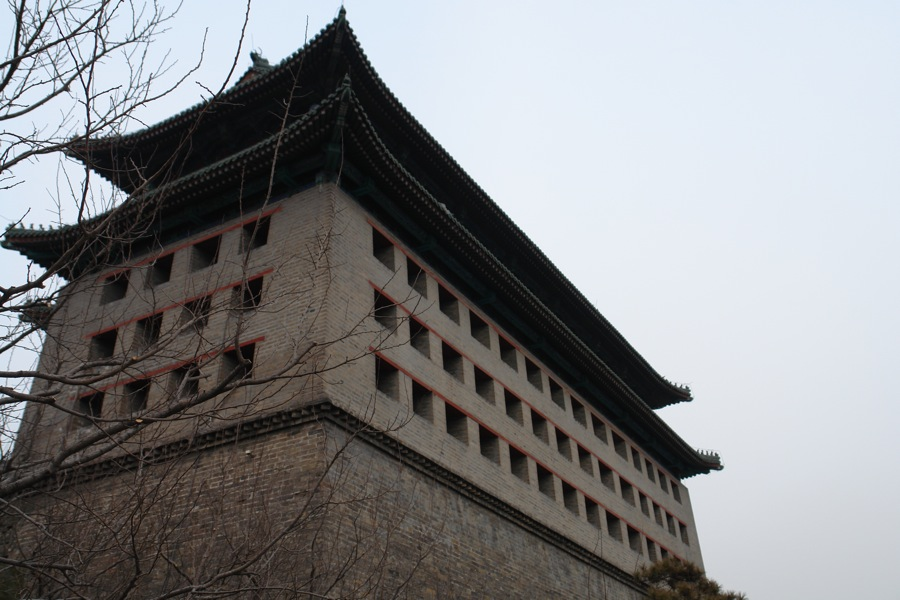
The Fox Tower in 2007

Shortly after 8 a.m. the next day, two rickshaw pullers near the Fox Tower along the city's old walls noticed a group of wild dogs showing interest in a bundle lying in the ditch near the wall, all that remained of the canal that had formerly run along it. An elderly man saw this too, and went down to take a closer look. After finding it was the severely beaten and stabbed body of what appeared to be a young European woman, he ran to the nearest police box, a quarter of a mile (400 m) away, to report it.

The rickshaw drivers secured the scene, keeping the dogs away and covering the body with a bamboo mat to discourage curious onlookers until detectives could arrive. Col. Han Shizhong of the Beijing police supervised the investigation. At first, he presumed the decedent to have been yet another of the many Russian Whites who, overwhelmed by despair and/or out of options, had ended their own lives; the preceding night having been Christmas in the Russian Orthodox calendar lent some support to this. But the wounds seemed more extensive than those a suicide might inflict. Aware that the possible killing of a wealthy foreign woman just outside the Legation Quarter might be of interest to the foreign authorities there, even though the Chinese had jurisdiction, Han called W.P. Thomas, the Legation Quarter's police commissioner, to the scene.

Uncertainty over the woman's identity ended when Werner stumbled across the scene a short while later. After resting at his home, he resumed his search for his daughter in the morning light and left a note about her disappearance with Thomas's office. When he saw the body, he shrieked, "Pamela!" and collapsed next to the body. He had apparently recognised the clothing and jewellery she was wearing; later a constable with the Foreign Legation who also knew Pamela confirmed the identification. By the evening the crime scene had been secured and processed, and Pamela's body was taken to Peking Union Medical College (PUMC) to be autopsied.

== Investigation ==
There were plenty of deaths to investigate in Beijing at that time. Each morning several bodies were routinely collected from the streets. Most were suicides or natural causes. Homicides were harder to resolve as they could have been either due to routine criminal activity and disputes, or Japanese provocations, or (increasingly) political assassinations carried out by the Kuomintang of its enemies both internal and external. General Song was also having some of the drug dealers he caught summarily executed, particularly if they were not Chinese or Japanese.

Both Han and Thomas knew that the investigation into Pamela's death would be unusual. While the Chinese had jurisdiction because of where her body had been found, it was entirely likely that it would be necessary to investigate her death by questioning members of the foreign community, some of whom might enjoy diplomatic immunity or at least reside in the Legation Quarter, where the Beijing police had no authority. That aspect of the investigation would be better conducted by law enforcement officers who did have jurisdiction.

Given Pamela's social standing, the case would likely attract not only the attention of the press but also official interest. British diplomats would probably not want to see the case solved in any way that would adversely affect the British image in China. Thomas proposed to Han that the Beijing police exercise their right to name the official who could serve as an envoy for the investigation, and suggested that that official be Detective Chief Inspector Richard Dennis, a Scotland Yard veteran who was chief of police in the British concession in Tianjin. He could not be as easily pressured by the Diplomatic Service since he was not under their authority. Han agreed, and the two would work together to try to solve the case, a binational cooperation unusual for the time.

Pamela's body, and where it was found, had already yielded some clues. The expensive platinum jewellery that had helped confirm the corpse's identity had not been taken, suggesting robbery was not the motive. Pamela's wristwatch had been stopped shortly after midnight, suggesting that was when she had died. There was no blood at the scene other than that on her clothes, suggesting she had been killed elsewhere and dumped there. Nearby was her membership card for the skating rink, with some blood on it; however, her bicycle and skates were never found.

=== Autopsy report ===
The autopsy yielded additional information of interest. Pamela had died from a brain haemorrhage caused by several blows to the head, possibly inflicted with a smooth-surfaced piece of wood or stone, blows strong enough to fracture her skull. From the proximity necessary to inflict those blows, and their directness, the pathologists performing the autopsy concluded she had been killed by someone she knew.

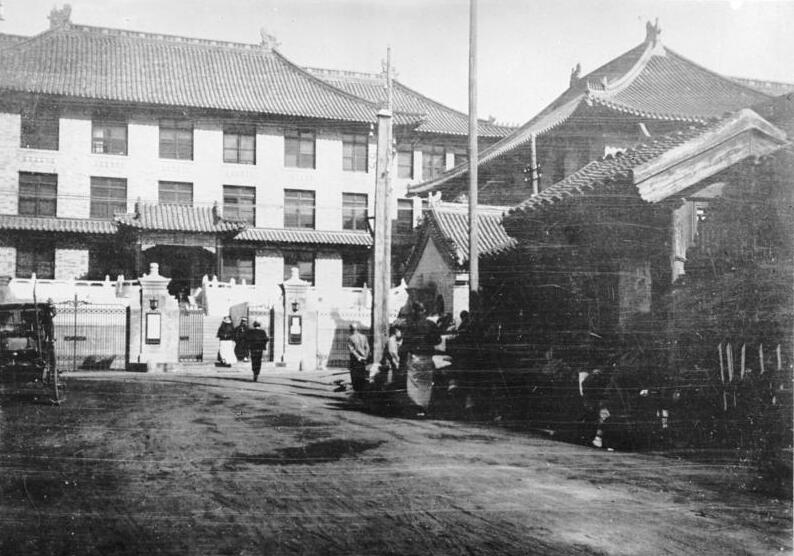
Peking Union Medical College, where Pamela was autopsied, in 1924

A similar blunt force trauma injury to the right arm was believed to have been inflicted after death because there was no haemorrhaging around it. Likewise, the low amount of blood released from the stabbings and slashings suggested those, too, were post-mortem. They had been inflicted with a knife, likely with two edges to the blade although possibly not equally sharp, at least 4 inches (10 cm) long.

Within the body, muscles had been severed cleanly. Through two slits in the abdomen, most of Pamela's internal organs had been removed and her blood drained. The skill required to do this as cleanly and quickly as it had been done suggested to the pathologist that whoever had done so had considerable skill, perhaps that of a surgeon or anatomist. The dogs that had been showing interest in the body could not have inflicted those wounds. Pamela's heart was also missing, with the ribs surrounding broken from the inside to do so, a task requiring a considerable amount of force. A knife had also been used to repeatedly penetrate her vagina, to the point that it could not be determined whether Pamela had been sexually assaulted either before or after she was killed.

One of the few internal organs that remained was Pamela's stomach. It was found to contain some partially digested Chinese food. Since she had not been known to have eaten anything other than the bread, cake and tea she had had at her friend's house, this along with the time her watch stopped suggested she had been alive for several hours after leaving the ice rink. The time of death was placed between 10 p.m. and 2 a.m.

Pamela's skirt was loose. Her silk stockings had been torn, and her underwear was missing. However, her overcoat and scarf were still with the body, along with shoes and some other personal effects. This further argued for the killing having taken place elsewhere, and the body being dressed afterwards.

It was concluded that the killing had been sexually motivated, "not the work of an ordinary sexual sadist", according to an obstetrician-gynaecologist who participated. Han and the doctors who performed the autopsy believed that the intent had been to dismember Pamela after her death but that whoever was doing so was unable to complete the task and hastily dumped the body. Han made sure distribution of the autopsy report was limited as he did not want the details of the mutilation widely reported in the press, since that would make the case harder to solve. He kept the only copy in his desk.

=== Interviews and leads ===
Han knew that, as a practical matter, he had twenty days to solve the case, after which his superiors and the press would lose interest in it and other crimes would likely demand his attention. Dennis arrived in Beijing by train, preceded by two of his subordinates who would also work with him for a few days. The two began their investigations at once. Many leads poured in, most of them false. One, a rickshaw puller who had been seen washing a bloodied seat cushion near where Pamela's body was found, turned out to have been cleaning up the mess from a fight between a Russian and an American marine.

Han and Dennis interviewed the friends that Pamela had last been seen with; their stories corroborated each other. Werner himself, though grief-stricken, told them of his last afternoon and his overnight search through the city after Pamela had failed to return. Some others in the foreign community, including many of the British diplomats Werner had clashed with during his career, seemed to think he might have been responsible. He did admit to officers that he had confronted a young Chinese man outside the house whom he accused of being too interested in Pamela, breaking the man's nose with his cane, a move he conceded was an overreaction. Werner told Dennis that he was sending Pamela back to England for continued schooling, owing to some unspecified incident at Tientsin Grammar, a development he was surprised the detective was unaware of.

In retracing Pamela's steps of the afternoon and night of 7 January, the detectives did learn one new piece of information. Between 3 and 4 p.m., Pamela had gone to the concierge at the Wagons-Lits Hotel and asked about renting a room, going so far as to check out the hotel's brochure. Why she did was not known—she could have been preparing for a visit by a boy from her class at Tientsin Grammar whom she had expressed interest in, or preparing to leave her father's home on a more long-term basis.

Although Han would not confirm any reports about the extent to which Pamela's body had been mutilated in his first press conference about the investigation, or Dennis's participation, he admitted that the police had no solid leads at that point, two days afterwards. Speculation filled the gap in reporting. The Fox Tower was long believed to be haunted by evil spirits, and there were some theories that settled on that explanation for the killing.

Some expatriates suggested Werner himself might have killed his daughter in a fit of rage. While his fits of temper were well known, and indeed had adversely affected his diplomatic career, Dennis ultimately believed he was innocent. Helen Foster Snow, one of the Werners' neighbours, told the detective that it might have been possible that Kuomintang assassins had mistaken Pamela for her, since the two looked similar; she knew that Chiang's government had not been happy with the things she and her husband Edgar had said about them, especially in contrast with their sympathetic portrayal of the communists.

Dennis considered the assassination theory plausible due to the strong resemblance between Snow and Pamela—in the dark, the two could easily have been confused. But the political assassinations carried out by Dai Li's Blue Shirts Society and its more elite counterpart, the Military Statistics Bureau, were much tidier affairs. Their targets were usually shot once in the head and dumped somewhere, not extensively mutilated after death.

Han ordered police to canvass the areas Pamela might have travelled through, particularly the area known as the Badlands just outside the Legation Quarter, a neighbourhood of hutongs where the bars and brothels that served and employed many of the émigrés and refugees in the city were located. Since Pamela's body must have been moved, possibly with a vehicle, he ordered officers to find and check every registered automobile in the Beijing area, even though those records had not been kept consistently. A week after the crime, a Russian landlady in the Badlands told police about finding a bloodied dagger and cloth in the possession of a tenant of hers.

=== Suspect arrested and released ===
The male suspect, known by the name Pinfold, was taken into custody by Han's officers and held at headquarters on Morrison Street (today Wangfujing). Dennis not only attended the interrogation but actively took part, despite orders given to him in secret to confine his role in the investigation to the Legation Quarter. Pinfold was later identified by Canadian diplomats in the city as a deserter from the Canadian Army. He had fled first to the U.S., where he had acquired a criminal record, and then to China, where he worked for several years as a bodyguard, before falling into low-paying jobs.

Pinfold was held overnight and refused to talk. He smoked heavily and fidgeted nervously, suggesting he was entering the early stages of withdrawal from the opiate addiction widespread among the city's less affluent foreign population at the time. One officer recognized him as a man he had seen lingering a little longer than other passers-by when he passed the crime scene, piquing detectives' interest further. In his personal effects they found a business card for an establishment at 27 Chuanban Hutong, a bar in the Badlands run by a Russian émigré that, like many other such businesses in Beijing at the time, doubled as a brothel. Canadian officials indicated he had often been seen at 28 Chuanban Hutong next door.

Pamela had ordinarily avoided the Badlands at night, according to her friends, but it was possible that, in her haste to get home for dinner, she might have chosen the more direct route, which would have taken her right past Nos. 27 and 28. Han had a squad of officers raid 28, while he and Dennis chose the more discreet route of visiting 27 themselves.

The raid received press coverage but yielded no new clues—patrons who had been shown pictures of Pamela did not recognize her as having been there on the night of 7 January, which had been crowded owing to the holiday. However, at 27 Chuanban, the manager, a former U.S. marine named Joseph Knauf, knew Pinfold and said he worked as security at the neighbouring bar. He also told the detectives that Pinfold had been present at weekend nudist gatherings at a cottage in the city's Western Hills, where participants also hunted in the surrounding woods, although that was becoming more difficult owing to the increasing Japanese presence.

Armed with that information, Han and Dennis returned to reinterview Pinfold, whereupon Dennis informed him that they knew about the nudist gatherings. Pinfold's reticence evaporated, and he admitted he had been at the events but only as a security guard (sometimes recruiting women to dance naked for attendees). He claimed not to have known Pamela. He refused to say where the blood on his dagger and clothes had come from.

=== The nudist weekends ===
At this point, Dennis was suddenly recalled to Tianjin for a meeting with the British consul there. He was briefed on why Werner had abruptly withdrawn his daughter from Tientsin Grammar: apparently, Pamela had alleged that the headmaster, Sydney Yeates, who also oversaw the house where she boarded while school was in session, had made sexual overtures to her. Yeates had agreed to leave his post and return to England at the end of the school year; in the wake of the murder, for which Yeates had an alibi, that departure had been preponed to the following week. Dennis was told to make sure the murder investigation did not result in any public disclosure of this potential scandal as it would be injurious to British prestige and standing in China at a very difficult time.

Werner also caused problems with the British authorities in Beijing. They offered a reward of a thousand Chinese silver dollars, roughly ten times what the average Chinese family lived on per year at the time, for information that would help resolve the case. Werner complained, to no avail, that the reward flyer should be printed in Chinese as well as English, and the money made available via a bank account so that the successful informant could claim it anonymously. Since many Chinese distrusted any governmental authorities, whether their own or foreign, he believed this would make it easier for a local informant to come forward.

Back in Beijing, Dennis learned from Han that Pinfold would have to be released. The pathologists had found that the blood on his knife and clothing was animal, not human, and there was no other evidence he could have been held on. A second pair of keys in his possession had been found to unlock a second residence of his in the Legation Quarter, meaning the authorities there would have to permit him to face charges, and the British consul, Nicholas Fitzmaurice, who was also by law presiding over the inquest as coroner, declined to do so as he did not believe there was sufficient evidence to secure a conviction (nor was he eager to set a precedent that would allow Legation Quarter residents to answer to Chinese courts so easily). After his release Pinfold's whereabouts are unknown, although he is believed to have left Beijing.

Pinfold's arrest did, however, yield a new lead. Dennis and Han began focusing on the nudist weekends. Pinfold had told them that they were organized by Wentworth Prentice, an American dentist whose patients were mostly wealthy expatriates and diplomats. Prentice had originally settled in China with his wife and children after graduating from Harvard's dental school in 1918, but in 1932 she had returned to the U.S. with the children. His file at the U.S. consulate suggested that at least one person there had been concerned for the safety of one of his children, but did not explain why.

Dennis and Legation Quarter police commissioner E.D. Howard went to interview Prentice at his flat in the quarter. It was located right next to the ice rink where Pamela had last been seen. When they arrived Prentice had the windows open, because, he explained, his landlord had decided to repaint the walls despite it being wintertime. He said he had never treated Pamela and that he had been at the cinema on the evening she disappeared.

In the next day's English-language newspaper, George Gorman, an Irish reporter known to be strongly sympathetic to the Japanese, criticized the authorities for even considering Prentice a suspect. He vouched for Prentice's character and suggested the real killers were Chinese, not Western. When Dennis spoke with Gorman he learned that he, too, participated in the nudist weekends. Gorman's wife also told him that the night of 6 January, Pamela had visited their house and taken tea with her and her daughter.

=== Conclusion ===
The investigation became more complicated at this point. Werner, unhappy with the lack of progress in the case, held a press conference of his own on the steps of the British Legation. He decried the lack of information on why Pinfold had been released. Drawing on his considerable knowledge of Chinese culture, he noted that there was absolutely no Chinese religious or folk tradition that involved the harvesting of organs, suggesting to him instead that contrary to widespread rumour his daughter's killer or killers were Western. To the existing reward, he added the offer of 5,000 Chinese gold dollars, most of his life savings, an amount triple what an average Chinese family of the time could earn in their lifetimes.

Werner's actions annoyed the authorities enough that they told Dennis and Han not to talk to him anymore, since he was so obviously overcome by grief. Contrary to what he had suggested, the authorities considered the killers to likely be one or more of the many sexually frustrated young Chinese men abounding in Beijing at the time.

Dennis, suffering from a nagging respiratory ailment since he had come to Beijing, had been told by his superiors in Tianjin that he had to return there soon. After some negotiation on his part, they agreed he could stay as late as the Chinese New Year, on 7 February. He and Han knew that as a practical matter, time was running out for them to solve the case even before then. They vainly sought to learn where Pamela's blood might have been, knowing that the location where she was killed was the only possible lead they had left.

On 29 January the inquest was reconvened. After hearing testimony from Pamela's friends and some of the investigating officers, Fitzmaurice recessed the proceeding for lunch and then announced, over reporters' protests, that in the afternoon he would hear from the doctors who had performed the autopsy in camera. At the conclusion of the day, he rendered his verdict that Pamela's death was an unlawful killing but left it open to a later hearing as to who might have committed the crime.

Despite Fitzmaurice's precautions, the newspapers were able to obtain details of the autopsy report and published them the next day. The details of the mutilation scandalized readers and made the foreign population even more fearful. It also made it more unlikely that the investigation would be able to find a suspect since the details of the killing were now widely known, and Han began to express doubt that the killer or killers would ever be found.

The Chinese New Year of 1937 was raucously celebrated in Beijing by Chinese and foreigners alike; many believed this might be the last such holiday for them and the city. After nothing turned up or happened that might have shed new light on Pamela's killing, Dennis returned to Tianjin to attend to pressing matters there, and Han moved on to other cases as well. The Japanese provocations were becoming increasingly bold, with tanks being driven through the city and Zeros flown overhead at low altitudes as part of what the Japanese generals still claimed was routine military manoeuvring even as they steadily increased their presence outside Beijing.

At the end of June, Fitzmaurice officially concluded the investigation into Pamela's death. By then the news had long vanished from the newspapers; a few freelance reporters attended in the hope of getting a short story. Pamela, Fitzmaurice said, had been murdered by person or persons unknown, possibly Chinese.

After the announcement, Fitzmaurice boarded a ship to return to England for his customary long summer holiday. Two weeks afterwards, the Marco Polo Bridge Incident south of Beijing finally led to war; the Japanese took Beijing and Tianjin by the end of July. Fitzmaurice retired rather than return.

== Werner's investigation ==
Werner remained in Beijing despite the occupation, continuing to live in his siheyuan even as many of the city's other foreigners clustered in the Legation Quarter, save the stateless Russian Whites, on the advice of their governments who said they would not be safe outside it. His research activities curtailed by the occupation, he devoted his energies to persuading the Foreign Office to reopen the case. He supplemented his requests with information he had obtained on his own, using his still-considerable financial resources. They were considerably helpful in a city where both inflation and unemployment had risen sharply as a result of the occupation, and he found many people willing to share information with him, including some former Beijing police officers whom the Japanese had let go from the force as politically unreliable.

Werner's investigation increasingly led him to the brothel at 28 Chuanban; its owners had apparently closed it the day after the murder and left Beijing for Tianjin or Shanghai. Likewise, Pinfold, following his arrest, had gone to Tianjin and asked a friend for help hiring a lawyer; the Canadian had also asked if Prentice had been arrested yet. Werner also had in his possession a receipt from Prentice for straightening some of Pamela's rear teeth about five weeks before the murder, orthodontic work so minor it would not have been noted as recent, and perhaps not at all, by the pathologists. This contradicted Prentice's assertion to Dennis that he had never treated Pamela.

Werner's agents eventually led him to the rickshaw puller who had briefly been held the day after the body was discovered. He told Werner a different story of how the blood got on his vehicle's cushion than what Han had told Dennis. He, too, had visited 28 Chuanban late that night, where he had picked up two men and a young European woman wrapped in a white sheet who seemed to him to have trouble moving on her own. It had been her blood on his cushion; Han's account of an unrelated fight was untrue. Werner tried on that basis to persuade the British diplomats to reopen the case, even taking the man with him on one visit, but they felt that the puller was not a credible witness.

After repeated requests, the Beijing police returned Pamela's clothes and effects to her father. He learned that many of them had not been checked for fingerprints nor properly preserved, leaving them useless as evidence. But in Pamela's diary, he learned that during the summer of 1936, she had gone on a weekend visit to the Western Hills with Gorman and his family, where he had apparently made a sexual overture to her that she rebuffed. That suggested to Werner another connection to Prentice, and a possible motive for the killing.

Throughout 1938 and into 1939, Werner continued his investigations. His repeated efforts to get British officials to reopen the case, which many of them saw merely as a pretext to attack them personally over old grudges or what he perceived as their initial failures in the investigation, led to such strain on his relations with them that they ultimately banned him from the Legation Quarter. Despite this, Werner was able to work with some of the other legations. The American consulate provided him with information on the criminal past of one of the former operators of 28 Chuanban, and later the Japanese, eager to embarrass the British, were able to get some witnesses to speak with him. But after the Tientsin Incident in the summer of 1939, in which the Japanese blockaded that city after Dennis had refused to turn over two Chinese assassins who had sought refuge from their likely execution in the British concession there, even that cooperation ended.

Ultimately Werner theorized that Prentice, Knauf and their associates from the nudist weekends had lured Pamela to 28 Chuanban under the ruse of a Christmas party in order to have sex with her. When she refused, a struggle ensued, during which someone struck the fatal blows to her head, possibly with a fragment of a chair that had broken earlier (Werner had managed to visit the brothel himself, and noticed a wooden chair where a broken leg had been replaced by a piece of metal). After her death, they transported her body to the Fox Tower, because it was dark and unpatrolled, where they mutilated it with the hunting knives they regularly carried. By the time police got around to asking any of them about what might have happened, they had arranged for the absence of key witnesses and coordinated their stories of what happened that night.

Werner was finally forced to leave his siheyuan and move back into the Legation Quarter in late 1941 after the Japanese attack on Pearl Harbor, along with other British and American bases around the Asian Pacific, triggered hostilities between Japan and the West. Even there he continued his efforts, writing long requests to the Foreign Office, which were not always delivered due to the difficulties of wartime. An unknown reviewer of one of the letters wrote in an attached memorandum, dated 1943, that the case deserved further examination than it had got up to that point, but nothing appears to have come of it.

== Aftermath ==
In March 1943 the Japanese removed all the remaining European residents from the Legation Quarter, including Prentice and Werner, and elsewhere in Beijing. After being marched to the train station before Chinese residents who were required to watch the spectacle, they were put on a train to the Weixian in Shandong, where they spent the remainder of the war. According to other survivors of the camp, Werner sometimes confronted Prentice about the killing, although he was not the only person the older man accused.

The outset of hostilities was even more trying for Dennis. Two weeks after Pearl Harbor, the Japanese relieved him of his duties as police chief in the Tianjin concession and imprisoned him, along with other members of the police force, in apparent retribution for his stand against them two years earlier. After months of solitary confinement and torture that culminated in Dennis signing a confession in Japanese to unknown alleged crimes, he was freed by the intervention of the Swiss consul and returned to England, where he worked a desk job with the British Army for the remainder of the war. Afterwards, he returned to China and took part in the war crimes prosecutions of some of the Japanese officials who had overseen his imprisonment; he returned to England and lived there until his death in 1977.

Han had been forbidden by his superiors from talking to Werner during the initial investigation, but during a chance encounter with Werner on the street in 1938, he apologised for his failure to resolve the case. The following year, Han was forced out of the police by the Japanese for what they felt to be insufficient zeal in investigating an assassination attempt on Wang Kemin, whom they had installed as president of their puppet state. After that his fate is unknown.

In 1945, following the end of the war and the liberation of Weixian, Werner returned to his home in Beijing. There he resumed pressing British officials about the case. The index of Foreign Office records in The National Archives shows one communication in 1945 that raises the subject of reopening the case, with the possibility of some connection to the Japanese, but the document itself has been weeded so its contents are unknown. Beyond that it appears Werner's appeals were unsuccessful. Werner remained in Beijing through the end of the Chinese Civil War and the establishment of the People's Republic under Mao in 1949. Two years later, he finally returned to England, where he died in 1954. Werner's lengthy obituary in The Times noted Pamela's murder in passing, in a short paragraph about his family, which would be the last time the crime was mentioned in any prominent published source for the remainder of the 20th century. Pamela and her mother were buried in the English Cemetery, now under the pavement of modern Beijing's Second Ring Road.

== Midnight in Peking ==
In the 2000s, British writer and business consultant Paul French, who had moved to China for his work after studying Chinese at the University of London, came across a footnote in a biography of Helen Foster Snow briefly discussing her fears in the wake of Pamela's murder that she had been the intended victim, as well as some of the other rumours sweeping Beijing's foreign community at that time. French woke up the next morning wanting to know more about the case and eventually felt a responsibility to tell the story in some form. During later research at The National Archives, rain led him to extend his visit. He looked through a box of 1940s records from the British embassy in China, wondering if any of them would have anything about the killing. There were many, including a 150-page letter from Werner documenting what his private efforts had uncovered about the case, a letter whose conclusions, implicating Prentice and the circle of fellow nudists around him, French accepted as the likeliest resolution.

Midnight in Peking, French's account of the case, was published late in 2011 and became a bestseller in many of the countries in which it was published over the next two years. It won the 2013 Edgar Award for Fact Crime Writing and the Crime Writers' Association Non-fiction Dagger Award for the same year. For a time after publication, French led walking tours of the areas of present-day Beijing's Dongcheng District where the investigation unfolded. Kudos Television bought the rights to adapt the story into a television serial shortly after the book's publication.

=== Criticism ===
Several critics, including two descendants of individuals who played prominent roles in French's account, set up a website casting doubt on Werner's conclusions and French's presentation of them, in response to the success of his book. They posted photographs of many original documents referred to in the book, primarily contemporary newspaper articles, book excerpts and the archived communications of British diplomats discussing the case.

==== Werner's reliability ====
The site authors argue Werner was not a credible source. French's account of his diplomatic career generally downplays the extent to which his difficulties getting along with his colleagues were due to his own inability to get along with them—a "constant series of frictions", John Jordan, then British ambassador, wrote to him in 1913. And specifically, French does not mention an incident that year in which Werner struck a customs official with a whip while British consul in Fuzhou, an incident which led the Foreign Office to invoke the Superannuation Act 1887 and forcibly retire him, one of only two times it did so with its diplomats in China during the treaty port era.

In his response to statements by witnesses to those incidents, the site authors reproduce a letter to Foreign Secretary Sir Edward Grey in which Werner refused to accept blame for the incident and instead focused on the perceived injustices done to him by Jordan and others, a pattern they say is also reflected in his handling of his daughter's murder investigation. Likewise, Werner's 1928 memoir Autumn Leaves presents the incident untruthfully, in a manner they claim is greatly favourable to Werner.

The site authors say Werner's dubious credibility should be kept in mind when considering the claims made in the lengthy letters to the Foreign Office on which French relied heavily for Midnight in Peking, claims that would be hard to substantiate and rely in part on unreliable or dead sources, in many cases possibly further tainted by the money Werner offered for their accounts. Many of Werner's assertions about Prentice and other suspects are not mentioned in any other accounts of the investigation, not the Foreign Office correspondence nor newspaper articles. Two of Werner's most important claims against Prentice are actually disproved by documentary evidence: newspaper records show there was a later cinema show the dentist could have attended on the night of Pamela's murder, and the receipt for Pamela's dental work is actually dated six years earlier than Werner claimed.

==== Inadequate sourcing by French ====
French comes in for criticism on his own for his poor sourcing. In an Asia Times interview, the authors note, he implied he had relied on the police and autopsy reports from the case but never cited them in his own footnotes for the book. They question whether French really saw them, since archivists at the Rockefeller Archive Center, which keeps all of PUMC's prewar records since the school was established with that family's money, have found no report from an autopsy performed later than 1933. Most of French's reconstructed account of the investigation comes entirely from Werner's letters. Likewise, any police records from that era did not survive the war years.

Werner himself, the site authors note, did not always hew strictly to his theory that Prentice and the nudists were responsible. Just before war began in December 1941, he wrote Ambassador Sir Archibald Clark Kerr that, instead of Prentice, he now suspected the Chinese student whose nose he had broken after accusing him of having had relations with Pamela. French also cited a 1948 account of the murder and investigation written by Fulton Oursler, under his "Anthony Abbot" pseudonym, based entirely on what Oursler learned while talking to reporters in a Shanghai bar on a visit there and then reviewing newspaper articles about it in his hotel, never coming any closer to Beijing. It is the apparent source for French's depiction of Pamela's last words before leaving the skating rink, much more fanciful than what her friends recalled her actually saying. Abbot also theorizes that the murder was committed by a visiting American who had similarly raped, killed and disembowelled young virgins at home; French never mentions that theory as an alternate to Werner's.

==== Japanese involvement and other theories ====
The authors furthermore note that besides the idea that Pamela had been mistaken for Helen Foster Snow, French fails to mention yet more alternate theories of the crime. Werner himself noted that Dennis was convinced that the murderer was a former school acquaintance of Pamela. Snow herself wrote of some ancient Chinese practices involving the harvest and ingestion of human organs for medicinal purposes. The mutilation of the body also suggests the possibility of a serial killer, a possibility that cannot be explored since records of crimes against Chinese residents of Beijing at that time are missing if indeed they were kept at all.

There is also some evidence, according to the site authors, suggesting that Pamela was killed by the Japanese, supposedly as revenge against Fitzmaurice for his refusal to prosecute the Sasaki incident, in which two British legation guards had allegedly killed two Japanese officers the previous summer. The consul had declined to pursue the charges for lack of evidence. British officials reported to London that the Japanese never even showed them any bodies, and the uniform fragments offered as proof of British involvement were more consistent with those worn by U.S. Marines than any British military personnel.

In 1938 Sir Edmund Backhouse, another British Sinologist of the era, told Beijing consul Allan Archer that his contacts among the Japanese had told him quite openly that the murder was committed by two of their countrymen as revenge for Sasaki. Archer was impressed enough that he wrote Sir Robert George Howe in Shanghai about it, saying he thought this was finally the truth and dismissing Werner's theories about Prentice and Pinfold, the only time those theories are mentioned anywhere in British official correspondence regarding Pamela's murder other than Werner's letters. However, Backhouse, whose major scholarly work was exposed as fraudulent years after his death, appears to have been trying to ingratiate himself with British authorities in the hopes of becoming valuable to them as a source of intelligence, as there are many implausibilities in how he claims to have come by this information.

However, Backhouse was not alone in his belief that the Japanese killed Pamela as revenge. Two other British diplomats in Beijing at the time told historian P.D. Coates several decades later that it was theorised among them that the Japanese, unable to get to Fitzmaurice's wife since she rarely left the heavily guarded Legation Quarter, settled instead for killing Pamela since she was the daughter of a former British consul who was less secure. "As you will know," one of the former diplomats told Coates, by way of explaining the mutilation, "there are traditions of this sort of thing in Bushido", the Japanese warrior code.

The theory of Japanese involvement seems to have persisted within British diplomatic circles to the end of the war. In 1945, an unknown official with the consular office wrote a memo about possibly reopening the case. The index of Foreign Office papers from that year summarises its subject as "Murder [of Pamela Werner] by Japanese in 1937". However, the actual document was weeded years ago and its content is not known or referred to in any other paperwork from the era.

== A Death in Peking ==
In 2018 a second book was published on the Werner murder: A Death in Peking: Who Really Killed Pamela Werner? by British retired police officer Graeme Sheppard (published by Earnshaw Books). As well as examining the cases against Prentice, Knauf, Cappuzzo, Gorman, and revealing the full identity and origin of Pinfold, this new account introduces previously unexamined suspects and leads, including British diplomat David John Cowan. It also introduces the previously unreported murder theory as disclosed by Backhouse, i.e. that Pamela was murdered by a group of Japanese militarists in an act of political revenge for the killing of a Japanese officer by British soldiers in 1936. A Death in Peking concludes that a former Chinese student friend of Pamela, Han Shouqing (Han Shou-ch'ing), was more than likely the lone offender.

== See also ==
- 1937 in China
- Cold case
- Crime in China
- History of Beijing
- List of unsolved murders (1900–1979)
