= Brian Altman =

English lawyer (born 1957)

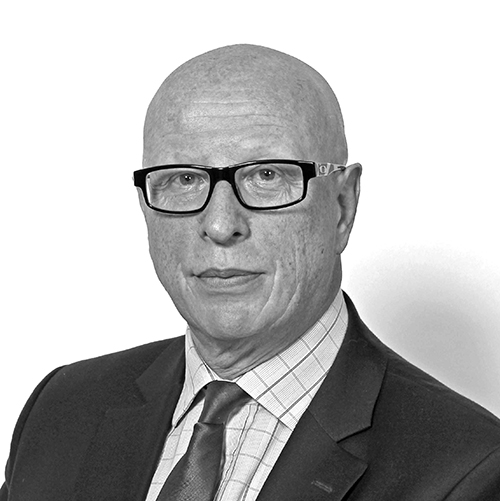
- Born: August 16, 1957 (age 68); London, England
- Education: King's College London
- Occupation: Barrister
- Website: Brian Altman KC - 2 Bedford Row

Brian Altman KC (born 16 August 1957) is an English lawyer. Altman was First Senior Treasury Counsel at the Central Criminal Court (Old Bailey) from 2010 to 2013. Altman is the joint Head of Chambers of 2 Bedford Row, barristers' chambers.

== Career ==
Altman was called to the Bar by the Middle Temple in 1981. In 1997 he was appointed junior Treasury Counsel - Standing Counsel to the Crown at the Central Criminal Court (Old Bailey). In 2002 he was appointed senior Treasury Counsel. Between 2010 and 2013 he was First Senior Treasury Counsel. In October 2019, Altman was appointed joint Head of Chambers of 2 Bedford Row, barristers' chambers, from where he practises.

Altman became Queen's Counsel in 2008. He was made a Master of the Bench of Middle Temple in 2010 and has been a Recorder of the Crown Court since 2003.

On 10 January 2017 he was appointed Lead Counsel to the Independent Inquiry into Child Sexual Abuse. He led in the Inquiry's 2017 hearings into historical allegations of child sexual abuse including those against Liberal MP Cyril Smith in Rochdale and in the Inquiry's March 2019 hearings examining whether there was a culture of deference and tolerance by the political parties and the police towards persons of public prominence in Westminster, as well as in the Inquiry's October/November 2019 hearings examining the institutional failures of the Roman Catholic Church in England and Wales in child protection and safeguarding. The Inquiry's final report was published in October 2022.

In the spring of 2021, Altman was appointed as Lead Counsel to the Brook House Inquiry, whose terms of reference are to examine the mistreatment of detained individuals at the Brook House Immigration Removal Centre in Gatwick, then run by G4S, which was exposed in a BBC Panorama programme in September 2017. The Inquiry concluded in September 2023 with the publication of its report.

Altman was commissioned by the Director of the Serious Fraud Office in May 2021 to investigate and report into the collapse of the Serco trial of R v Woods and Marshall in April 2021. His report was published by the Serious Fraud Office on 21 July 2022.

Altman acted on behalf of Boris Johnson, the former UK Prime Minister, who appeared at the Covid Inquiry in December 2023.

In addition to his inquiry work, Altman's main specialisms are fraud and bribery, as well as corporate governance, compliance and regulatory work. His practice also includes serious crime such as homicide, terrorism, police misconduct, money laundering and large scale drugs cases.

Altman has also advised the Competition & Markets Authority on alleged cartel offences, the Serious Fraud Office and the Financial Conduct Authority.

In 2017 Altman secured the acquittal of GD, a former senior police chief in Avon & Somerset, who was accused of sexually assaulting women on cross country trains in the West Country. In 2015 Altman represented one of four serving police officers accused of misconduct in public office arising from a high-profile murder case in Bristol in July 2013. The officer was unanimously acquitted after a seven-week trial.

Altman has prosecuted some of the highest profile cases of recent times. In 2007/08, Altman successfully led for the prosecution in the case of notorious serial killer Levi Bellfield for the murders of Amélie Delagrange and Marsha McDonnell and the attempted murder of Kate Sheedy, and in 2011 he successfully led for the prosecution in the Milly Dowler murder case. The cases have been featured in several books and television documentaries, in particular Colin Sutton's book 'Manhunt' which was serialised on television in 2019.

In 2012 Altman led in the successful prosecution of Eric Bikubi and Magalie Bamu who were charged with the 2010 murder of Magalie's younger brother, Kristy Bamu, who was tortured over several days during a process of Congolese witchcraft and exorcism, as featured in Richard Hoskins' book 'The Boy in the River'.

In 2018 Altman led for the prosecution in the 1986 Brighton Babes in the Wood murders. Having been acquitted in 1987 at Lewes Crown Court, and following a successful application to the Court of Appeal under the double jeopardy rule to quash the acquittals and to retry him, Russell Bishop was retried at the Old Bailey and convicted of the murders of two nine-year-old girls, Karen Hadaway and Nicola Fellows. The case is the oldest to be tried under the double jeopardy rule. The case was featured in the 2019 BBC2 television programme The Babes in the Woods Murders: The Prosecutors.

In March 2020, Altman led for the prosecution in the first trial concerning the death of PC Andrew Harper who was dragged to his death by a car driven by three young men escaping from their theft of a quad bike. That trial had to be aborted due to COVID-19. Altman did not prosecute the retrial in June 2020 due to other professional commitments, when the three were convicted of PC Harper's manslaughter.

In March 2021, Altman appeared on behalf of Post Office Ltd in the Court of Appeal Criminal Division in relation to 42 cases referred by the Criminal Cases Review Commission (CCRC) in what was the largest conjoined appeal ever heard by the Court of Appeal Criminal Division. The appeals related to subpostmasters who had been prosecuted by the Royal Mail Group and post-2012 by Post Office Ltd (POL) for offences of theft, fraud and false accounting between 2000 and 2013 relying on evidence from the Fujitsu Horizon accounting system. In May 2009 Computer Weekly had published an article which stated that the Horizon system may be responsible for accounting errors and after earlier denials, POL later agreed Horizon suffered with defects generating those errors. The appeals of the 39 successful appellants had been conceded on two different grounds of abuse of process (with four of those 39 appeals conceded on both grounds of abuse of process). Only three of the 42 appeals were opposed on both grounds, and the Court of Appeal upheld all three of those convictions. The appeals have been very high profile and have attracted media and political attention. The Financial Times stated on 28 December 2023:"Altman advised the Post Office between 2013 and 2021. He conducted a review that said sub-postmaster prosecutions after 2010 were carried out in a 'well organised, structured and efficient manner'. The public inquiry is probing whether Altman provided the Post Office with a 'comfort blanket'."

Altman has regularly prosecuted serious terrorism offences, including Khalid Ali, who spent five years as a Taliban bomb-maker in Afghanistan and was arrested while plotting a high visibility terror attack in Whitehall in 2017; a major Islamic State-influenced terror plot to kill servicemen or policemen in the UK; 2011 Birmingham terror bomb plotters; former Guantanamo detainee Moazzam Begg; 'on the run' IRA man John Downey; trained jihadi fighters returning from Syria; and Neil Lewington, a white supremacist operating a bomb factory.

== Personal life ==
Altman was born 16 August 1957, one of twins, and educated at Chingford Senior High School. He graduated from King's College London with an LL.B. in 1978 and also studied at the University of Amsterdam. He is married with four children, and lives in West London.
