= Richard Hoskins =

Author and criminologist

- Born: Richard Hoskins; Beaconsfield, Buckinghamshire, England
- Education: Oxford University; King's College London
- Occupations: University Professor (Former), writer, Criminologist
- Website: richardhoskins.co.uk

Richard Hoskins (born 1964) is an author and criminologist, with expertise in African ritual crime.

== Early life ==
Hoskins was born in Beaconsfield, Buckinghamshire, in February 1964, and educated at Uppingham School, at Bedford School, and at the Royal Military Academy Sandhurst, before a Special Short Service Commission in 3rd Battalion the Royal Anglian Regiment. At the age of twenty-one Hoskins travelled to Africa intending a gap year, but stayed from 1986 until 1992.

Upon returning to Britain, Hoskins enrolled at Oxford University to read theology and took a double First, before completing a PhD at King's College London. Hoskins went on to be a senior lecturer at Bath Spa University, and a senior research fellow at King's College London. He has taught religious studies at Shebbear College in Devon.

== Expert witness ==
Whilst working at Bath Spa University, Hoskins was called upon by the Metropolitan Police Service to work as an expert witness in the Torso in the Thames case. He has since been called as an expert witness in over a hundred criminal cases, including numerous high-profile murders, such as those of Victoria Climbié, Jodi Jones and the Eric Bikubi and Magalie Bamu case. Hoskins has been called upon to provide commentary on these cases and the related field by numerous press organisations. He is an expert on African religions. He is the only registered multi-cultural expert on the UK national police SOCA database.

Hoskins has made television and radio appearances concerning numerous cases, most notably a documentary for the BBC entitled "Witch Child", a documentary concerned with the Torso in the Thames case and a BBC Radio 4 programme. He is a Patron of the Build Africa charity.

More recently, Hoskins was asked by detectives of Wiltshire Police to examine claims made by "Lucy X" of a VIP satanic sex-abuse ring which included the former Prime Minister Sir Edward Heath, as part of two separate investigations by the force into sexual abuse. Fearing that he may be removed from the police database of experts as a result of his revelations,

== Personal life ==
Hoskins has been married twice. He currently lives in London where he writes crime fiction. He is a keen runner and completed the 2014 London Marathon in 2 hours 45 minutes, placing him 7th for all over 50. He lived for four years as a woman, but de-transitioned in 2020.

== Publications ==
Hoskins' first book, The Boy in the River, was published by Pan Macmillan and became a Sunday Times bestseller, receiving critical praise in several press publications.

The Boy in the River was named Gold Winner in the Crime Writers' Association Dagger Awards 2013. The panel of judges "highly commended" the "gripping story".
