= The Disappearance of Madeleine McCann =

American docu-series on Netflix

- Genre: Docu-series
- Directed by: Chris Smith
- Starring: Anthony Summers; Gonçalo Amaral; Robbyn Swan
- Original languages: English; Portuguese; Spanish
- No. of seasons: 1
- No. of episodes: 8

Production
- Running time: 43-65 minutes per ep.
- Production companies: Pulse Films; Paramount Television

Original release
- Network: Netflix
- Release: March 15, 2019

The Disappearance of Madeleine McCann is an American Netflix documentary series directed by Chris Smith. It premiered on Netflix on March 15, 2019, starring Anthony Summers, Gonçalo Amaral, and Robbyn Swan, and explored the disappearance of three-year-old Madeleine McCann from the seaside resort of Praia da Luz in Portugal while on holiday with her family. The McCann family opposed its production and refused to take part in it.

== Premise ==
The Disappearance of Madeleine McCann depicts the disappearance of three-year-old Madeleine McCann. She vanished from an Algarve holiday apartment at the seaside resort of Praia da Luz in Portugal, in May 2007 as her parents enjoyed a meal with friends 100 yards away. It explores the media, the investigation, and the McCanns, although the McCanns themselves do not take part in this docu-series. The series comprises eight episodes retelling the McCann case. The total running time is 435 minutes.

== Reception ==
The McCann family did not support the production of the documentary, refused to take part, and discouraged others from getting involved. Lucy Mangan, writing for the Guardian, and Ed Power for the Telegraph, both criticised the series for being too long, filled with irrelevant details, and failing to offer any new evidence or insights into the case. Sophie Gilbert, writing for The Atlantic, describes the series as "gripping", and praises how it shows the conflict between detectives investigating the case and the media.

== See also ==
- 3096 Days
