= John Bossy =

British historian (1933–2015)

John Bossy FBA
- Born: 30 April 1933; Edmonton, North London
- Died: 23 October 2015 (aged 82)
- Awards: CWA Gold Dagger for Non-Fiction, Wolfson History Prize

Academic background
- Education: St Ignatius college, Stamford Hill, North London
- Alma mater: Queens' College, Cambridge
- Thesis: Elizabethan Catholicism: The Link with France (1961)
- Influences: Walter Ullmann

Academic work
- Discipline: Historian
- Sub-discipline: Early-modernist
- Notable works: Christianity in the West, 1400-1700 (1985)
- Notable ideas: "social miracle", "migration of the holy"

John Antony Bossy FBA (30 April 1933 – 23 October 2015) was a British historian who was a professor of history at the University of York.

== Career ==
Bossy was educated at Queens' College, Cambridge, where he was inspired by Walter Ullmann. He lived and lectured in London (1962–66) and Belfast (1966–78) and was a member of the Institute for Advanced Study at Princeton.

Bossy specialised in the history of religion, particularly in that of Christianity during the Reformation period and beyond. According to some commentators, his approach fused together elements of disciplines such as sociology and theology.

His Ph.D. thesis was written on the relations between French and English Catholics during the period of the Renaissance which contained within it the seeds of later work regarding Michel de Castelnau.

He frequently wrote for the London Review of Books and published series of articles in the journals Recusant History and Past & Present. In 1991 The Embassy Affair won the British Crime Writers' Association CWA Gold Dagger for Non-Fiction and (jointly) the Wolfson History Prize.

He moved to the University of York in 1979, where he was professor of History until his retirement in 2000. In 1993 he was elected a Fellow of the British Academy.

== Works ==
- The English Catholic Community, 1570-1850 (1979)
- 'The Mass as a Social Institution, 1200-1700' Past & Present, Vol. 100, Issue 1, 1 August (1983)
- Christianity in the West, 1400-1700 (1985)
- Peace in the Post-Reformation (1998)
- Giordano Bruno and the Embassy Affair (1991; second edition 2002)
- Under the Molehill: An Elizabethan Spy Story (2001)
- Disputes and Settlements: Law and Human Relations in the West (2003) – edited by Bossy
- Bossy, John (1982). "Catholicity and nationality in the northern European counter-reformation". Studies in Church History. 18: 285–296. doi:10.1017/S042420840001617X. ISBN 9780631180609. S2CID 159944415.
