= Francisco Goldman =

American novelist

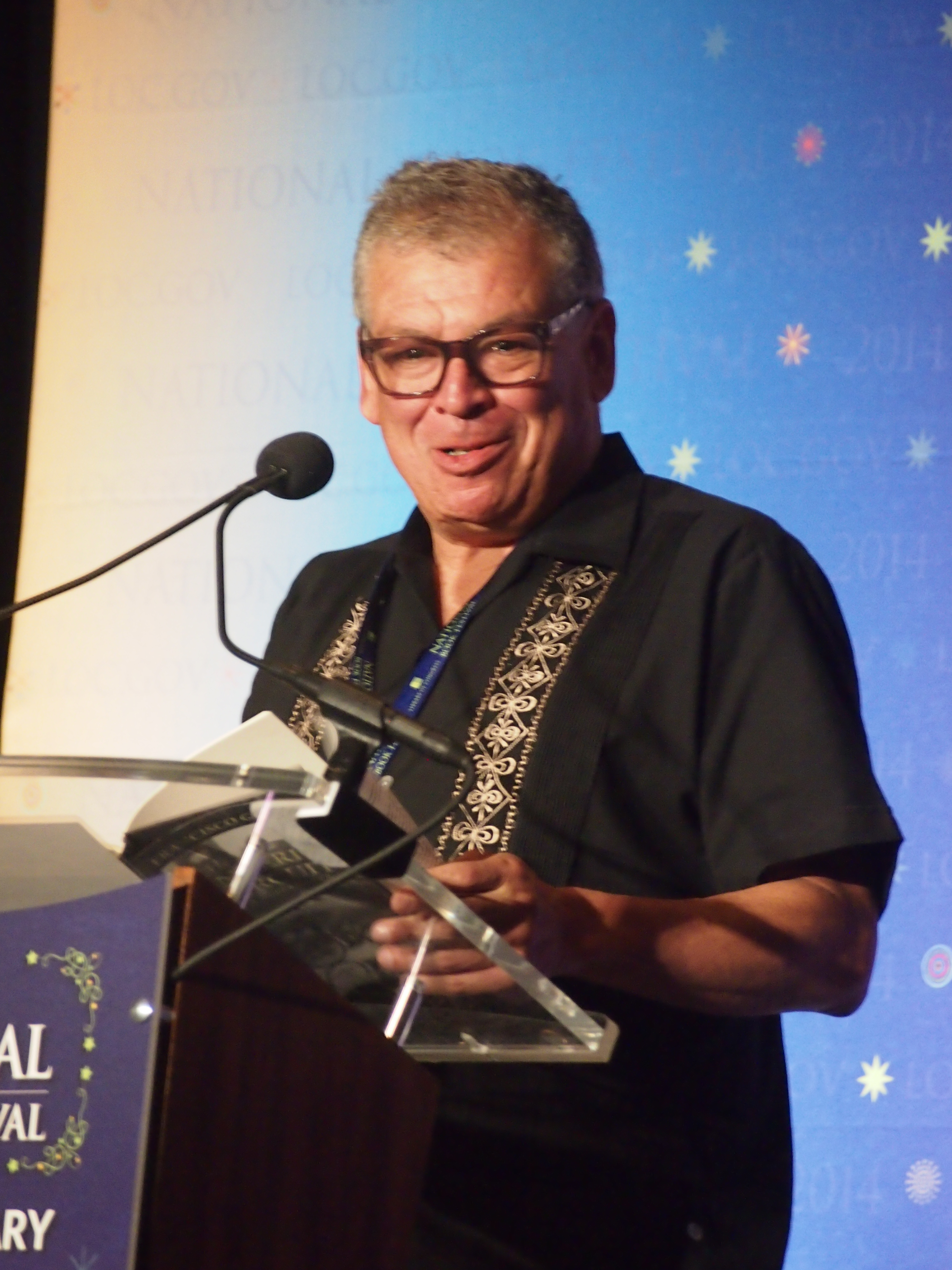
- Born: 1954 (age 71–72); Boston, Massachusetts, U.S.
- Education: Hobart College; University of Michigan (BA); The New School; New York University
- Occupations: Novelist, journalist
- Spouse: Aura Estrada

Francisco Goldman (born 1954) is an American novelist, journalist, and Allen K. Smith Professor of Literature and Creative Writing, Trinity College. His most recent novel, Monkey Boy (2021), was a finalist for the 2022 Pulitzer Prize for Fiction.

== Life ==
Francisco Goldman was born in Boston, Massachusetts, to a Catholic Guatemalan mother and Jewish-American father. Goldman attended Hobart College, the University of Michigan and the New School for Social Research Seminar College. He studied translation at New York University, and is fluent in English and Spanish.

He has taught at Columbia University in the MFA program; Brooklyn College; the Institute of New Journalism (founded by Gabriel García Márquez) in Cartagena, Colombia; Mendez Pelayo Summer Institute in Santander, Spain; the North American Institute in Barcelona, Spain. He has been a resident of UCross Foundation.

Francisco Goldman was awarded the Mary Ellen von der Heyden Fellowship for Fiction, and has been a Guggenheim Fellow, and a 2010 Fellow at the American Academy in Berlin.

He has written for The New Yorker, the New York Times Magazine, Harper's and many other publications. He divides his time between Brooklyn and Mexico City; teaches creative writing and literature at Trinity College; and directs the Aura Estrada Prize.

== Career ==
Francisco Goldman has published five novels and one book of non-fiction. His most recent novel is Monkey Boy, published in 2021 and a finalist for the 2022 Pulitzer Prize for Fiction. His prior novel, Say Her Name, was published in April 2011. His first novel, The Long Night of White Chickens (1992), won the Sue Kaufman Prize for First Fiction. His subsequent novels have been finalists for several prizes, including The Pen/Faulkner and the International Dublin Literary Award. The Art of Political Murder won The Index on Censorship T.R. Fyvel Book Award, The WOLA/Duke Human Rights Book Award, and has been shortlisted for the 2012 Ryszard Kapuscinski International Award for Literary Reportage. Say Her Name, in its French translation, won the 2011 Prix Femina Etranger.

In November 2007, Goldman acted as guest-fiction editor for Guernica Magazine. The Ordinary Seaman was named one of the 100 Best American Books of the Century by The Hungry Mind Review. He received a Guggenheim Fellowship in 1998 and has been a fellow at the Cullman Center at the New York Public Library. His books have been translated and published in a total of 15 languages worldwide.

In the 1980s, Goldman covered the wars in Central America as a contributing editor to Harper's magazine. Goldman's 2007 book, The Art of Political Murder: Who Killed the Bishop?, is a nonfiction account of the assassination of Guatemalan Catholic Bishop Juan José Gerardi Conedera by the Guatemalan military. The book, an expansion on his article in The New Yorker, represents the culmination of years of journalistic investigation.

It was selected as a New York Times Notable Book, and a Best Book of the Year at Washington Post Book World, The Economist, The Chicago Tribune, The San Francisco Chronicle and the New York Daily News. The book has been widely acclaimed. The book is the winner of the 2008 TR Fyvel Freedom of Expression Book Award from the Index on Censorship and of the 2008 Duke University-WOLA (Washington Office on Latin America) Human Rights Book Prize. It was shortlisted for the 2008 Golden Dagger Award in non-fiction and for the inaugural Warwick Prize for Writing. The paperback edition was published with an Afterword meant to rebut critics in a "disinformation campaign" against the conclusions of the book.

== Marriage and family ==
Goldman was married to Rebecca (Bex) Brian, the novelist, in the early 1980s. They divorced in 1985. In 2005, Goldman married Aura Estrada, who died in a bodysurfing accident in Mexico in 2007. He established The Aura Estrada Prize in her honor, to be given every two years to a female writer, 35 or under, who writes in Spanish and lives in the United States or Mexico.

Goldman wrote about his wife's death and their relationship in the autobiographical novel Say Her Name. He adapted a portion of it as "The Wave," published in the February 7, 2011 edition of The New Yorker.

== Works ==
- —— (1992). The Long Night of White Chickens. Grove/Atlantic. ISBN 9780802144607.
- —— (1997). The Ordinary Seaman. Grove/Atlantic. ISBN 9781555846404.
- —— (2004). The Divine Husband: A Novel. Grove/Atlantic. ISBN 9781555846381.
- —— (2014). The Art of Political Murder: Who Killed the Bishop?. Grove Press. ISBN 9780802122568.
- —— (2011). Say Her Name. Grove/Atlantic. ISBN 9780802195678.
- —— (2011). The Interior Circuit: A Mexico City Chronicle. Grove/Atlantic.
- —— (2022). Monkey Boy. Grove Press. ISBN 9780802157676.

=== Selected journalism, criticism and short fiction ===
- The New Yorker; New York Times Sunday Magazine; New York Review of Books; Book Forum; Esquire; Bomb
- In Mexico: Letras Libres; Gatopardo; Equis.
- Prologue to The Adventures and Misadventures of Maqroll, by Alvaro Mutis, published by New York Review of Books Classics, 2003.
- "Murder Comes for the Bishop", The New Yorker, March 15, 1999.
- "The Great Bolaño", The New York Review of Books, July 19, 2007.
- "Chapter 1: I Drank the Water", New York Times, June 27, 2007.
- "THE THOROUGHLY DESIGNED AMERICAN CHILDHOOD; A Robot For the Masses", November 28, 2004.
- "In The Shadow Of The Patriarch", New York Times, November 2, 2003.
- "Guatemala's Fictional Democracy", New York Times, November 3, 2003.
- "The Autumn of the Revolutionary", New York Times, August 23, 1998.
- "In Guatemala, All Is Forgotten", New York Times, December 23, 1996
- "In a Terrorized Country", New York Times, April 17, 1995.
- "Ending Up in Downsville", (book review) New York Times, June 20, 1993.
- "Poetry and Power in Nicaragua", New York Times, March 29, 1987.
- Four Op-ed pieces in the New York Times, and two in the Los Angeles Times.

=== Anthologized ===
- “Mexico DF” in the Beacon Press Best of 2001.
- ”Moro like Me” in Half and Half: Writers on Growing up Biracial and Bicultural.

=== Translations ===
- Two short stories by Gabriel García Márquez in Playboy Magazine, one of which, “The Trail of your *Blood in the Snow,” won that year's National Magazine Award for fiction.

=== Interviews ===
- "Susan Choi Talks with Francisco Goldman", The Believer, August 2004.
- Francisco Goldman talks to Semi Chellas", Brick: A Literary Journal, Winter 2004 (Issue 74).
- "Literary Guisado: An Interview with Francisco Goldman" by Marion Winik, The Austin Chronicle, June 6, 1997.
- Francisco Goldman discusses his new book "The Divine Husband", NPR Morning Edition, October 27, 2004.
- Interview with Francisco Goldman by Whit Coppedge, Pif Magazine, October 30, 2008.
- CBC Radio, interview by Eleanor Wachtel (recorded October 2011 at the International Festival of Authors, first broadcast November 27, 2011). "'Say Her Name' with author Francisco Goldman". Writers and Company.
