= David Canter =

Psychologist (born 1944)

Professor David Canter
- Born: David Victor Canter; 5 January 1944 (age 82); Liverpool, England
- Known for: Forensic psychology, investigative psychology and environmental psychology

Academic background
- Education: University of Liverpool

Academic work
- Discipline: Psychology
- Sub-discipline: Forensic psychology, architectural psychology and investigative psychology
- Notable works: Criminal Shadows: Inside the Mind of the Serial Killer (1994) Mapping Murder: The secrets of geographical profiling (2003) Investigative Psychology: Offender Profiling and the Analysis of Criminal Action (2009) Experiments in Anti-social Behaviour: Ten studies for students

David Victor Canter (born 5 January 1944) is a British psychologist known for his contributions to environmental psychology, behaviour in emergencies, forensic psychology, and investigative psychology. He is Emeritus Professor of Psychology at the University of Liverpool and has held senior academic and research positions at several UK universities. His work has influenced academic research, professional practice in policing, architectural design, emergency planning, and applied behavioural science.

== Early life and education ==
Canter was born on 5 January 1944 in Liverpool, England. He studied psychology at the University of Liverpool, where he obtained both his BA and PhD in psychology. His early academic development included training and research in environmental and architectural psychology, focusing on how people perceive, experience, and behave within built environments.

== Academic career ==
Following the completion of his PhD Canter held a series of early research and academic positions at the University of Liverpool and the University of Strathclyde. He subsequently joined the University of Surrey, where he progressed through the academic ranks from Lecturer to Reader, and later Professor of Applied Psychology and Professor of Psychology. He also served as Head of the Department of Psychology at Surrey from 1987 to 1991.

During this period, Canter played a role in establishing environmental and architectural psychology as a recognized academic discipline. His research focused on how people perceive, experience, and behave within built environments, and how architectural design can influence social interaction, cognition, and well-being. He collaborated with architects and designers, and provided consultancy input to architectural practices during the 1970s and 1980s.

He contributed to foundational texts in the field, including The Psychology of Place (1977), which became a widely cited work influencing building design, urban planning, and the development of human-centered environments. He also co-authored Designing for Therapeutic Environments with his wife, Dr Sandra Canter, a clinical psychologist, addressing the role of design in healthcare settings.

Canter was also active in academic publishing and editorial leadership. He founded the Journal of Environmental Psychology in 1980 and served as its Managing Editor until 2002, helping to establish an international platform for research in environmental psychology.

== Investigative psychology ==
Canter is known as a pioneer of investigative psychology, which he named, a discipline that applies empirical psychological methods to criminal investigation and offender profiling.

In the mid-1980s, he collaborated with British police on the “Railway Rapist” case, producing one of the first systematic psychological offender profiles used in a major criminal investigation.

He later formalized the term “investigative psychology” in the early 1990s to describe an evidence-based, theoretically grounded approach to analyzing criminal behaviour. His framework integrates social psychology, environmental psychology, geography, and quantitative methods to examine patterns in criminal activity and offender behaviour.

Over the course of his career, Canter provided profiling and investigative advice to over 100 police investigations. In addition to investigative consulting, he also provided expert evidence in court in a number of cases, primarily for the defense, offering psychological analysis of behaviour, testimony, and evidential interpretation.

== Research, publications, and methods ==
Canter has authored and edited more than 20 books and over 300 peer-reviewed publications spanning environmental psychology, emergency behaviour, and forensic psychology. His methodological contributions include the use of multidimensional scaling, spatial analysis, behavioural modelling, and decision-support frameworks to analyze complex behavioural data.

In addition to pioneering offender-profiling methodologies and establishing investigative psychology as a distinct academic field, Canter made important contributions to the analysis of crowd dynamics and stadium safety following major football disasters in the United Kingdom.

His research informed both the Popplewell Inquiry and the subsequent Taylor Inquiry, helping shape understanding of spectator movement, crowd management, and stadium design. This work formed the basis of his influential book Football in Its Place, for which Lord Popplewell wrote the foreword. The book examined the social and architectural dimensions of football crowds and stadium safety and has been recognized as a significant contribution to the reform of British football infrastructure; it was later reissued as interest in the historical development of football safety policy was renewed. Canter’s work in this area complemented his broader scholarship on the relationship between built environments and human behaviour, reinforcing his reputation as one of the leading applied psychologists of his generation.

In addition to his academic research, Canter has made contributions to public understanding of psychology through radio and television documentaries exploring criminal investigation, offender behaviour, and forensic science. These include the documentary Helping the Police with Their Enquiries, which examined the practical application of psychological profiling in criminal investigations and later formed the basis of his book Criminal Shadows. He also contributed to the six-part television documentary series Mapping Murder, which explored geographic and behavioural approaches to criminal investigation and was subsequently developed into the book of the same name.

=== Selected publications ===
- The Psychology of Place (1977)
- Fires and Human Behaviour (edited volume)
- Criminal Shadows: Inside the Mind of the Serial Killer (1994)
- Mapping Murder: The Secrets of Geographical Profiling (2003)
- Investigative Psychology: Offender Profiling and the Analysis of Criminal Action (2009)
- Criminal Psychology in Action: A Project-Based Approach (2025)
- Rethinking the Psychology of Place (2026)

=== Later career ===
In addition to his core psychological research, Canter has pursued interdisciplinary interests later in his career. He completed an MA in Music Composition at the University of Huddersfield and subsequently obtained a PhD in music composition from Liverpool Hope University, where he is a Visiting Professor.

His creative work includes musical compositions, some of which are publicly available through online platforms such as YouTube and SoundCloud. He has also engaged in visual arts, with a sculpture selected for exhibition at the Royal Academy Summer Exhibition 2021 and the Royal Cambrian Academy of Art Annual Open Exhibition 2026.

Canter has also conducted research in complementary medicine, for which he was awarded an Honorary M.D. (Comp Med) in recognition of his contributions in that area.

== Awards, fellowships, and recognition ==
His book Criminal Shadows: Inside the Mind of the Serial Killer (1994) received both the Crime Writers’ Association Gold Dagger Award for Non-Fiction (1994) and the Anthony Award for Best True Crime (1995), reflecting its impact in communicating psychological approaches to criminal behaviour to a broader audience.

He is an Honorary Fellow of the British Psychological Society and was also elected as a Fellow of the Academy of Social Sciences.

In addition, Canter is a Fellow of the Royal Society of Medicine.

== Books ==
- The Study of Meaning in Architecture (1968), Publisher: D.V. Canter
- Scales for the Evaluation of Buildings (1971), Strathclyde University
- People and Buildings: A Brief Overview of Research (1972), Council of Planning Librarians
- Psychology for Architects (1974), London: Applied Science, ISBN 0-85334-590-2
- The Psychology of Place (1977), Architectural Press, ISBN 0-85139-532-5
- Studies of Human Behavior in Fire: Empirical Results and Their Implications for Education and Design (1983), University of Surrey
- Criminal Shadows: Inside the Mind of the Serial Killer (1994), Harper-Collins, ISBN 1-928704-21-2
  (won 1995 Anthony Award for Best True Crime book)(won 1994 Golden Dagger award for True Crime)
- Criminal Shadows – Inner Narratives of Evil (2000, paperback), Authorlink, ISBN 978-1-928704-21-8
- Psychology in Action (1996), Dartmouth, ISBN 1-85521-365-6
- Mapping Murder: The Secrets of Geographical Profiling (2003), Virgin Books. ISBN 1-85227-078-0
- Criminal Psychology: Topics in Applied Psychology (Topics Applied Psychology) (27 June 2008), Hodder Arnold, ISBN 978-0-340-92892-9
- The Faces of Terrorism: Multidisciplinary Perspectives. Cross-disciplinary Explorations (ed.) (2009), WileyBlackwell, ISBN 978-0-470-75381-1
- Forensic Psychology: A very short introduction (2010), Oxford University Press, ISBN 978-0-19-955020-3 (also translated into Egyptian)
- Forensic Psychology for Dummies (2012), John Wiley and Sons Ltd, ISBN 978-1-119-97738-4(ebk)

Collaborations

- Architectural Psychology (ed.) (1970)
- Psychology and the Built Environment (1974) (ed. with Terence Lee), ISBN 978-0-470-52149-6
- Environmental Interaction: Psychological Approaches to Our Physical Surroundings (1975) (ed. with P. Stringer), ISBN 978-0-8236-1685-5
- Designing for Therapeutic Environments: A Review of Research (ed. with S. Canter) (1979)
- Psychology in Practice: Perspectives on Professional Psychology (ed. with S. Canter) (1982)
- Facet Theory: Approaches to Social Research (ed.) (1985)
- The Research Interview: Uses and Approaches (ed. M. Brenner and J. Brown) (1985)
- Environmental Social Psychology (ed. with J. C. Jesuino, L. Soczka and G. M. Stephenson) (1988)
- Environmental Perspectives (ed. with M. Krampen and D. Stea) (1988)
- Environmental Policy, Assessment and Communication (ed. with M. Krampen and D. Stea) (1988)
- New Directions in Environmental Participation (ed. with M. Krampen and D. Stea) (1988)
- Football in its Place: An Environmental Psychology of Football Grounds (with Miriam Comber and David L. Uzzell) (1989). Introduction by Sir Oliver Popplewell. Taylor & Francis. ISBN 978-0-415-01240-9
- Fires and Human Behaviour (ed.) (1990), Fulton, ISBN 1-85346-105-9
- Empirical Approaches to Social Representations (1993); with Breakwell, Glynis. Oxford University Press. ISBN 0-19-852181-2
- Criminal Detection and the Psychology of Crime (1997); with Alison, Laurence. Aldershot: Ashgate/Dartmouth. ISBN 1-85521-454-7
- Interviewing and Deception – Offender Profiling Series, Vol. I (1998); with Alison, Laurence. Aldershot: Ashgate. ISBN 1-85521-380-X
- Profiling in Policy and Practice – Offender Profiling Series, Vol. II (1999); with Alison, Laurence. Aldershot: Ashgate. ISBN 1-84014-782-2
- The Social Psychology of Crime: Groups, Teams and Networks – Offender Profiling Series, Vol. III (2000); with Alison, Laurence. Aldershot: Ashgate. ISBN 1-84014-497-1
- Profiling Property Crime – Offender Profiling Series, Vol. IV (2000); with Alison, Laurence. Alderhost: Ashgate. ISBN 1-84014-787-3
- Profiling Rape and Murder – Offender Profiling Series, Vol. V (2008); with Alison, Laurence. Alderhost: Ashgate. ISBN 1-84014-495-5
- Profiling: Principles, Processes, Practicalities (2008); with Keppel, Robert. London: Prentice Hall. ISBN 0-13-119276-0
- Psychology and Law: Bridging the Gap (Psychology, Crime and Law) (ed.) (2008); with Zukauskiene, Rita (ed.). Ashgate, ISBN 978-0-7546-2660-2
- Environmental Psychology; with Bonnes, Mirilia and Hartig, Terry (28 April 2008), Ashgate, ISBN 978-0-7546-2530-8
- The Investigative Psychology of Serial Killing; with Youngs, Donna (28 September 2008), Ashgate, ISBN 978-0-7546-2548-3
- Investigative Psychology: Offender Profiling and the Analysis of Criminal Action (3 October 2008, paperback); with Youngs, Donna. John Wiley and Sons. ISBN 978-0-470-02397-6
- Becoming an Author: Advice for Academics and Professionals (2006); with Fairbairn, Gavin. Open University Press, ISBN 978-0-335-20275-1
- Biologising the Social Sciences: Challenging Darwininan and Neuroscience Explanations (2014); with Turner, David (ed., Routledge ISBN 978-0-415-82480-4
