= Anthony Summers =

Irish author and journalist (born 1942)

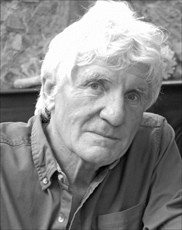
- Summers in 2010
- Born: Anthony Bruce Summers; 21 December 1942 (age 83); Ireland
- Occupations: Non-fiction author, documentary filmmaker
- Spouse: Robbyn Swan (m. 1992)

Anthony Bruce Summers (born 21 December 1942) is an Irish author and journalist. He is a Pulitzer Prize Finalist and has written ten non-fiction books. He worked for the BBC in current affairs coverage as a producer and then as an assistant editor of the long-running investigative documentary series Panorama. His first book was published in 1976.

== Career ==
Summers is an Irish citizen who has been working with Robbyn Swan for more than thirty years before she became his co-author and fourth wife. After studying modern languages at Oxford University, he began work in laboring jobs, later progressing to freelance reporting for London newspapers. He later worked at Granada TV's World in Action, the UK's first tabloid public affairs program, and following that he wrote the news for the Swiss Broadcasting Corporation's Overseas Service. Later, he went back to England to BBC's Television News and then the BBC's 24 Hours, a late evening current affairs show that brought viewers international coverage of events.

Summers became the BBC's youngest Producer at 24, travelling worldwide and sending filmed reports from the United States, across Central and Latin America, and the conflicts in Vietnam, the Middle East, and Africa. A main focus, though, was on the momentous events of the 1960s and 1970s in the United States – such as on-the-spot reports, during 1968, on the assassination of Martin Luther King Jr. and on Robert F. Kennedy's bid for the presidency. He smuggled cameras into the then Soviet Union to obtain the only TV interview with dissident physicist Andrei Sakharov – when he was under house arrest, having just won the 1975 Nobel Peace Prize.

Before moving on from the BBC, Summers became an Assistant Editor of the weekly program Panorama.

Based in Ireland for many years, he has since the mid-'1970s concentrated on investigative non-fiction, sometimes taking four to five years to complete a book.

== Works ==
Summers has written about historical figures including Tsar Nicholas II of Russia, President John F. Kennedy, FBI Director J. Edgar Hoover, President Richard Nixon, and Admiral Husband Kimmel, who commanded the U.S. fleet at Pearl Harbor. He is author of a major book on the 9/11 attacks on New York and Washington. He has also written biographies of celebrities Marilyn Monroe and Frank Sinatra, and investigations of Britain's Profumo Affair and the 2007 disappearance in Portugal of the British child, Madeleine McCann.

Most of Summers' books were developed as TV documentaries. Honeytrap was credited as a source for the John Hurt movie Scandal.

=== The File on the Tsar, with Tom Mangold (1976) ===
Summers published The File on the Tsar with former BBC colleague, Tom Mangold, in 1976. The book is on the disappearance and presumed execution of Nicholas II, last Tsar of Russia, and his family. In the UK, The Sunday Times said it "demolished the massacre story beyond recovery. There is not a dull page in this book." In the U.S.A., the Los Angeles Times called it "a compelling and impressive work", Cosmopolitan deemed it "sensational...a masterful work of great suspense, meticulously researched". In a comparison that must surely have pleased the authors, The Toronto Sun rated the book's "superlative investigative reporting that makes Woodward and Bernstein seem like beginners."

=== Conspiracy (1980), since updated as Not in Your Lifetime (1998 and 2013) ===
In the late 1970s Summers was working on a documentary for Panorama about the recently released report from the United States House Select Committee on Assassinations. Interviews for that program served as the impetus for Summers' 1980 book on the assassination of President John F. Kennedy, Conspiracy. Conspiracy was later updated as Not in Your Lifetime: The Defining Book on the JFK Assassination. In the most recent, 2013, edition, Summers was first to report the alleged confession of a Cuban sharpshooter, Herminio Díaz García, to have taken part in the assassination. Summers was interviewed for the 1993 documentary Who Was Lee Harvey Oswald? produced by PBS's Frontline.

The book won the Crime Writers' Association's Gold Dagger for Non-Fiction in 1980. The New York Times described Conspiracy as "important...serves to dramatize, as no previous book has done, the superficiality of the Warren Commission's investigation." The Boston Globe described Conspiracy as "the closest thing we have that literary chimera, a definitive work on the events in Dallas."

In the UK, The Daily Telegraph described Summers' approach as "dismissing the more fevered theories while casting doubt on the Warren Commission". Author and journalist Burton Hersh described Conspiracy as "bedrock to the literature".

=== Goddess, the Secret Lives of Marilyn Monroe (1985) ===
The Boston Globe's reviewer described Summers' biography of Marilyn Monroe as "mesmerizing, disturbing...reads like something out of a Robert Ludlum thriller." The New York Times' Christopher Lehmann Haupt wrote that the book made for "extraordinary reading...the ghost of Marilyn Monroe cries out in these pages." Lehmann-Haupt wrote that one of Summers's most sensational conclusions was that Robert F. Kennedy was involved with Monroe's death and that at some point he removed evidence that she was sexually involved with him and his brother from the scene. About these conclusions, Lehmann-Haupt wrote "[I]t's possible that the exposure of hidden weaknesses in [Summers'] case may turn his reconstruction to dust. But his case is singularly impressive."

Summers' research is criticised by the literature professor Sarah Churchwell in her work The Many Lives of Marilyn Monroe. Churchwell observes that although Summers interviewed 650 people, "The interviews often repeat second- or third-hand accounts of what someone else said, and neither Summers nor his sources is [sic] particularly dispassionate". Churchwell writes that "Summers proffers – but does not prove – a series of sensational claims".

In April 2022, Netflix premiered a feature-length documentary film, The Mystery of Marilyn Monroe: The Unheard Tapes, based on the Goddess book, directed by Emma Cooper. Summers features prominently in the film, which includes Summers' previously unreleased audiotaped interviews of close friends and contacts of the actress.

=== Honeytrap, the Secret Lives of Stephen Ward, with Stephen Dorril (1987) ===
Summers' and Stephen Dorril's investigation of the British political scandal known as the Profumo Affair was widely reviewed in the British press. The Observer said the book "ought to be read...Profumo is Italian for perfume, but the whole thing stinks to high heaven." The Tribune judged it "quite exceptional...massive demystification of the social and sexual lives of the English ruling class."

=== Official and Confidential, The Secret Life of J. Edgar Hoover (1993) ===
The Christian Science Monitor described Summers' 1993 biography of former FBI Director J. Edgar Hoover as "gritty, fast-paced and disturbing", that his "case against Hoover is overwhelming." The Philadelphia Inquirer review considered Summers' take on Hoover "an important book that should give all of us pause, especially policy makers."

In a review for The New York Times, by contrast, Christopher Lehmann-Haupt characterised the writing and presentation in Summers' book on Hoover as "slapdash." The review judged Summers' fact checking as "unsatisfying," and his sourcing as "ill-organized and impenetrable." As a whole, the Hoover book set "a new standard of what might gently be called revisionism." The book gained a great deal of publicity and aroused controversy. ABC News journalist Susan Donaldson James stated that Summers "exposed the secret sex life of Hoover" but also disputed the book's allegation that Hoover was a crossdresser. Summers interviewed more than 800 witnesses, including Hoover's Stork Club companion Luisa Stuart. There was such widespread press coverage of the controversial cross-dressing allegation that Bill Clinton, President at the time of the book's publication, joked to reporters that he was having a problem filling the post of FBI director. It was "hard", he said, "to fill J. Edgar Hoover's...pumps."

=== The Arrogance of Power: The Secret World of Richard Nixon, with Robbyn Swan (2000) ===
In The New York Times Book Review, Christopher Hitchens wrote that the "inescapable conclusion" of the book, "well-guarded by meticulous research and footnotes, is that in the Nixon era, the United States was, in essence, a 'rogue state.'". Publishers Weekly thought the book "impressive...the most thorough case against Nixon yet." In The San Francisco Chronicle, Steve Weinberg wrote that, "in many ways, The Arrogance of Power is the best single-volume, full-life biography of Nixon ever published."

After describing the book as "a muckraking, gossipy biography that goes well beyond any previous one-sided assaults against [Nixon]", historian Melvin Small concluded: "What we get with Summers is a juicy story of scandal, mental illness, and evil. Nixon haters will love it. As for historians, that is another matter."

=== Sinatra, The Life, with Robbyn Swan (2005) ===
USA Today's reviewer praised the "extensive documentation of the legendary crooner's involvement with the Mafia." Author Norman Mailer praised the book as "one of the very few bona fide, three-dimensional portraits of an amazingly complex, interesting and sometimes god-awful guy." In the UK, The Times' reviewer, Christopher Silvester, wrote that "Summers and Swan tell us much that is new, and with panache."

=== The Eleventh Day: The Full Story of 9/11 and Osama Bin Laden, with Robbyn Swan (2011) ===
In 2011, Summers' and Swan's The Eleventh Day: The Ultimate Account of 9/11 was published to mark the tenth anniversary of 9/11. The Wall Street Journal said that the book's "essential contribution to the annals of the attacks is its painstaking examination of questions the 9/11 Commission finessed." John Farmer, a 9/11 Commission senior counsel, praised the book as "meticulous and fair...an extraordinary synthesis of what is known about the 9/11 attacks."

According to The Daily Telegraph's Toby Harnden, the authors' "principal criticisms are that the Bush administration was asleep at the switch on 9/11; that vital intelligence was ignored; that the FBI and CIA did not share information; and that Saudi Arabia was intimately connected to al-Qaeda and is sometimes overindulged by the US."

Harnden took the view that there was "no real evidence" for Summers' and Swan's claims that the CIA negotiated with Osama bin Laden prior to those attacks, nor of their attempt to recruit two of the hijackers as agents. While criticizing the authors for a lack of original research, failure to interview major figures within the Bush administration, and "habit of posing portentous questions without answering", he noted that their depiction of the "horrors inside the World Trade Center" and the bravery of the Flight 93 passengers was "well written and moving".

The Eleventh Day was a Finalist for the 2012 Pulitzer Prize for History and was awarded the Crime Writer's Association Gold Dagger for Non-Fiction in 2012.

=== Looking For Madeleine, with Robbyn Swan (2014) ===
In 2014, in the UK only, Summers and Swan published Looking For Madeleine, an account of the disappearance in Portugal in 2007 of the British child Madeleine McCann. The Daily Telegraph described the book as "compelling." Judy Finnigan, who presented the program "Richard & Judy", observed that it was "forensically detailed". In 2019, Summers and Swan were a major on-screen element in "The Disappearance of Madeleine McCann", an 8-part series for Netflix. The authors frequently contribute their views and analysis on the case in the press and on broadcasts.

=== A Matter of Honor: Pearl Harbor, Betrayal, Blame, and a Family's Quest for Justice, with Robbyn Swan (2016) ===
Published to mark the 75th anniversary of the Japanese attack on Pearl Harbor, Summers' and Swan's A Matter of Honor considered the circumstances in which Admiral Husband Kimmel, then the commander in chief of the U.S. Pacific Fleet, had been blamed, accused of dereliction of duty, and publicly disgraced. They published new documentary evidence and found that Admiral Kimmel had been unjustly blamed and that President Roosevelt - contrary to charges made over the years - had not known in advance that the attack was imminent. Admiral James Lyons, himself a former commander-in-chief Pacific, thought the book "the most comprehensive, accurate, thoroughly researched book...ever written" on the case. The book was also praised by historians Douglas Brinkley and David Kennedy.

== Filmography ==
During his career at the BBC, Anthony Summers sent reports on subjects as varied as:

- The civil war between royalists and republicans in Yemen. He broke the story that Egypt, which was helping the republicans, was using gas bombs against civilians.
- An interview with a member of the Charles Manson family still at large following the Tate-Labianca murders.
- Interviews with figures as contrasted as Chile's President Salvador Allende – soon to die in a bloody right-wing revolution – and Republican presidential candidate Barry Goldwater.
- Summers made two visits to Cuba, where he suffered the fate of many before and after him – waiting for but not getting the promised interview with Fidel Castro.
- In Bolivia, defying a government ban on journalists, he travelled over rugged country to the site of Che Guevara's death. Before Guevara was killed, Summers had been approached by a sympathiser hoping to arrange a BBC interview of the guerrilla leader.
- The Tupamaro guerrilla movement in Uruguay.
- The tension in Argentina between the Catholic hierarchy and "worker priests".
- The US Drug Enforcement Administration's operations on the Mexican border.
- A reflection on American servicemen who returned from the Vietnam War.

== Awards ==
The Eleventh Day was a finalist for the 2012 Pulitzer Prize for History and it won the Golden Dagger, the Crime Writers' Association's top non-fiction award. Summers is the only author to have won the award twice. that year, he was made a Fellow of the Literary & Historical Society of University College Dublin in 2012.
