= Robbyn Swan =

American journalist and author

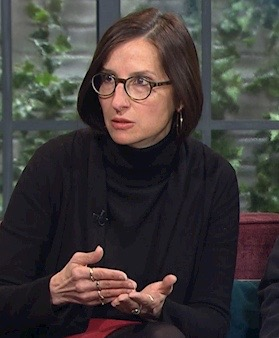
- Born: Milford, Connecticut, USA
- Education: Smith College, 1984
- Occupation: Journalist • Author
- Spouse: Anthony Summers (m. 1992)
- Website: robbynswan.com

Robbyn Swan is an American journalist and author. Her book, The Eleventh Day: The Full Story of 9/11 and Osama Bin Laden, co-authored by her husband Anthony Summers, was a finalist for the Pulitzer Prize in History.

== Early life and education ==
Swan was born in Milford, Connecticut and is of Italian-American heritage. She graduated from Milford High School.

She attended Smith College where she was a double major in Government and Russian, and graduated in 1984. Swan did post-graduate work toward an M.A. in Soviet and East European Studies at George Washington University, but did not complete the degree. During her time at George Washington University, Swan interned with the non-profit military policy think tank, The Center for Defense Information and with political magazine, The National Journal.

== Career ==
Swan began her career as a freelance journalist in Washington, D.C., briefly writing a weekly column for Defense News. In 1989, she was hired by Anthony Summers to conduct research for his book Official and Confidential: The Secret Life of J Edgar Hoover, a biography of the powerful long-time Director of the Federal Bureau of Investigation. Swan also worked as a researcher for author John le Carré on his book, The Night Manager.

In 1992, Swan married Anthony Summers, and the pair have subsequently written five books together. In 1993, Summers and Swan took part in preparing a documentary about the assassination of President John F. Kennedy for PBS's Boston affiliate WGBH's “Frontline” program. The finished program, “Who Was Lee Harvey Oswald?” strongly suggested that Oswald had acted alone in killing the President. Summers and Swan removed their names from the credits. The program, the pair said, “does not fully reflect the results of our research.” Summers and Swan went on to more fully develop that research in a lengthy article that appeared in the December 1994 edition of Vanity Fair magazine.

The Arrogance of Power, the couple's 2000 biography of Richard Nixon, was lauded as “the best one-volume full-length biography of Nixon ever published.” Among the book's most significant and widely reported findings were Swan's interviews with the former President's psychotherapist, Dr. Arnold Hutschnecker, and Nixon's White House abuse of the drug Dilantin. The book added much new, credible detail to the accusation that, in 1968, Nixon sought to persuade South Vietnam's President Nguyen Van Thieu not to agree to join peace talks in Paris with the United States, North Vietnam and the Viet Cong. Nixon's actions, if proven, prolonged the Vietnam War and cost thousands of lives. Summers’ and Swan's reporting has since been buttressed by later Nixon biographers.

In 2005, Swan and her husband published Sinatra: The Life, a biography of Frank Sinatra that focuses on the singer's relationships with women, his politics, and his links with the Mafia. Among the book's most sensational revelations was comedian Jerry Lewis’s recollection that Sinatra had regularly carried money for the mob. The book contained an allegation that, in 1969, the then 53-year-old singer had sexually assaulted a young woman in one of the guest bungalows on his Palm Beach estate. The woman in question, Susan Murphy, allowed the authors to identify her and to publish a photograph of her taken at the time. Asked about the claim, a representative for the Sinatra family said only: “It sounds crazy. Frank Sinatra honored women all the time.”

In 2011, on the tenth anniversary of the terrorists attacks on New York and Washington, Summers and Swan published The Eleventh Day: The Full Story of 9/11 & Osama bin Laden. Their book notably debunked various 9/11 conspiracy theories that accused the Bush administration of involvement with the attacks. According to a review in The Telegraph [UK], the authors’ "principal criticisms are that the Bush administration was asleep at the switch on 9/11; that vital intelligence was ignored; that the FBI and CIA did not share information; and that Saudi Arabia was intimately connected to al-Qaeda and is sometimes overindulged by the US." The reviewer argued, however, that there was "no real evidence" for the claims of Summers' and Swan's sources that the CIA negotiated with Osama bin Laden prior to those attacks, or that the Agency attempted to recruit two of the hijackers as agents.

In October 2026, a series of investigative reports published by Le Monde (France) revealed the existence of recently declassified CIA documents that substantiated the hypothesis proposed by Swan and Summers, asserting that the Saudi elite and a segment of its administration had provided support and financial resources to al-Qaeda, until at least 2003 according to the CIA papers.

The Eleventh Day was a finalist for the 2012 Pulitzer Prize in History and was also awarded the Crime Writers’ Association's Gold Dagger for Non-Fiction in 2012.

The couple's next book was 2014's Looking for Madeleine, an account of the disappearance of Madeleine McCann in 2007. At the time of its original publication, the book drew much criticism on social media from those who believe the parents of the then three-year-old British toddler bear responsibility for her disappearance. More objective commentators, though, have largely praised the couple's work on the case. Summers, and especially Swan, are featured heavily in the eight-part 2019 Netflix original series The Disappearance of Madeleine McCann.

In 2016, on the 75th anniversary of the Japanese attack on Pearl Harbor, Summers and Swan released A Matter of Honor: Pearl Harbor: Betrayal, Blame, and a Family’s Quest for Justice. The book was written with the cooperation of the family of Admiral Husband E. Kimmel, who was Commander-in-Chief of the Pacific Fleet at the time of the attack, and included never-before-published documents from U.S., British, and Dutch archives. Pulitzer-prize winning historian, David M. Kennedy praised A Matter of Honor as “scrupulously researched and rigorously argued”. Though the book went a long way toward exonerating Admiral Kimmel of the “dereliction” charge that has haunted his family for two generations, it has not yet – as the family had hoped – led to the restoration of the Admiral's four-star rank.

== Personal life ==
Swan is the fourth wife of author Anthony Summers whom she married in 1992. The couple have three children together, and Summers has two sons from previous relationships.

Swan has been open about her struggle with the eating disorder anorexia nervosa, which carried on well into her adulthood, and she volunteers with the Ireland's Eating Disorders Association, Bodywhys.
