= Sarah Wise =

Sarah Wise (born ca. 1966) is an English journalist, academic guest lecturer, tutor, and author of books on 19th-century social history for the general reader.

In 1984 Sarah Wise matriculated at the University of Southampton, where she graduated in 1988 with a B.A. in English literature. She was from January to June 1985 an exchange student with Rutgers University in New Jersey, thus giving her an excellent opportunity at the age of 19 to explore New York City. After graduating from the University of Southampton, she became a journalist, working in production for the magazine Marie Claire, which launched its UK print edition in 1988. After becoming Marie Claire's chief sub-editor and production editor, she resigned to pursue a career as a freelance journalist with a focus on the arts. She wrote articles for The Guardian, The Independent on Sunday, The Observer Magazine, and The Times, as well as other newspapers and magazines. While working as a freelance journalist, she attended evening classes as part of a joint honours course offered by the English and history departments of Birkbeck College, University of London. The course was for an M.A. in Victorian Studies. While researching her essays for the M.A., she became familiar with the historical incidents that became the basis for her first two books. She completed her M.A. degree in 1996.

At the age of 23, Sarah Wise began her career as a freelance journalist, living in London. Throughout her career she has written with a strong focus on the reader, or readership, that she keeps in her mind. Her idea of the reader in her audience arises from her thinking about someone, perhaps a close friend, who is "intelligent, open-minded, curious, but without any specialised knowledge." In 2004, her first book The Italian Boy: Murder and Grave-Robbery in 1830s London was published by Jonathan Cape. The book won the 2004 Gold Dagger for Non-Fiction of the Crime Writers’ Association and was shortlisted for the 2005 Samuel Johnson Prize for Non-Fiction. The 2004 book was the inspiration for The Frankenstein Chronicles, aired on ITV Encore in November 2005. Her second book The Blackest Streets: The Life and Death of a Victorian Slum (2008, The Bodley Head) was shortlisted for the Ondaatje Prize of the Royal Society of Literature. Wise's second book was part of the historical basis for the television series Victorian Slum House, aired by the BBC in May 2017. Her third book Inconvenient People: Lunacy, Liberty and the Mad-Doctors in Victorian England (2012, The Bodley Head) was shortlisted for the 2014 Wellcome Book Prize of the Wellcome Trust. Her fourth book The Undesirables: The Law that Locked Away a Generation was published in early 2024. She contributed a chapter to the best-selling book Charles Booth's London Poverty Maps, edited by Mary S. Morgan. Wise was a guest on Radio 4's In Our Time to talk about Charles Booth's work related to poverty and social reform in London. She has also appeared on the BBC's television series ‘'Who Do You Think You Are?’' as a history expert.

Her interests include the working classes in Victorian England, London in fictional literature from the early 1800s, the slum fiction of the late 1800s, 19th-century mental health history, and Victorian literature's portrayals of altered mental states. Sarah Wise teaches writing techniques and 19th-century social history and related literature to both undergraduates and older adult learners. She is a visiting professor in the University of California English for Academic Purposes (UCEAP) program of the London Study Center. At City University of London, when she teaches literary criticism on the Creative Writing Non-Fiction Masters, she emphasises to her students two main rules: "never bore your reader; and don’t confuse your reader".

== Books ==
- The Italian Boy: Murder and Grave-Robbery in 1830s London. London: Jonathan Cape. 2004. ISBN 0224071769; hbk; 375 pages
- The Blackest Streets: The Life and Death of a Victorian Slum. London: Bodley Head. 2008. ISBN 9780224071758. LCCN 2008428889; xii+333 pages
- Inconvenient People: Lunacy, Liberty and the Mad-Doctors in Victorian England. London: Bodley Head. 2012. ISBN 9781847921123. LCCN 2012551918; xxii+473 pages
  - Inconvenient People. Counterpoint Press. 2014. ISBN 978-1-61902-322-2.
- The Undesirables: The Law that Locked Away a Generation. London: Oneworld Publications. 2024. ISBN 978-0-86154-455-4.
  - The Undesirables. Simon & Schuster. 2024. ISBN 978-0-86154-456-1. catalogue entry at Simon & Schuster website
