= Zed Books =

UK non-fiction publishing company

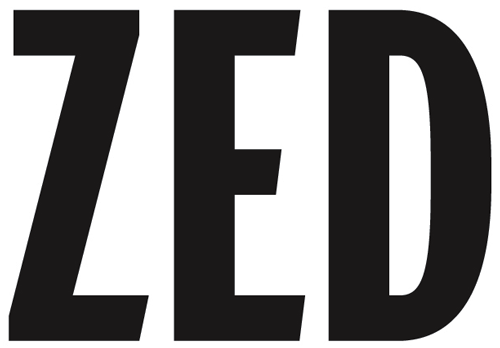
- Parent company: Bloomsbury Publishing
- Founded: 1976; 50 years ago
- Founder: Roger van Zwanenberg
- Country of origin: United Kingdom
- Headquarters location: London, SE11
- Distribution: NBN International (most of world); Chicago Distribution Center (Americas)
- Publication types: Books
- Nonfiction topics: Politics, economics, gender studies, development studies, environment
- Official website: www.zedbooks.net

Zed Books is a non-fiction publishing company based in London, UK. It was founded in 1977 under the name Zed Press by Roger van Zwanenberg.

Zed publishes books for an international audience of both general and academic readers, covering areas such as politics and global current affairs, economics, gender studies and sexualities, development studies and the environment.

== Ownership ==
Until 2020, Zed Books was organized as a worker-owned cooperative.

In March 2020, it was announced that "certain assets of Zed Books Limited" had been acquired by Bloomsbury Publishing Plc. for £1,500,000 and that Zed would operate within Bloomsbury's Academic & Professional division as "a good strategic fit with Bloomsbury's existing publishing lists".

== Authors ==
Zed's authors include Nur Masalha, Nawal El Saadawi, Eleanor Roosevelt, Assata Shakur, Yanis Varoufakis, Vandana Shiva, Maggie Nelson, Ece Temelkuran and Paul French, as well as hundreds of internationally respected journalists and academics.
