= John le Carré: The Biography =

2015 book by Adam Sisman

- Author: Adam Sisman
- Subject: John le Carré
- Genre: Biography
- Publisher: Bloomsbury
- Publication date: 2015
- ISBN: 9781408827932

John le Carré: The Biography is a 2015 biography of John le Carré written by Adam Sisman It was published by Bloomsbury (UK), Harper (US) and Knopf (Canada).
