= Criminal Shadows: Inside the Mind of the Serial Killer =

1994 book by David V. Canter

- First edition
- Author: David V. Canter
- Subject: Forensic Psychology
- Published: 1994
- Publisher: HarperCollins
- Media type: Print (Paperback)
- Pages: 412
- Awards: CWA Gold Dagger for Non-Fiction (1994), Anthony Award for Best True Crime (1995)
- ISBN: 1-928704-21-2
- Website: Criminal Shadows: Inside the Mind of the Serial Killer

Criminal Shadows: Inside the Mind of the Serial Killer is a 1994 book written by English professor of psychology, David V. Canter. It was the winner of two literary awards: the Gold Dagger for Non-Fiction (1994) and the Anthony Award for Best True Crime (1995).

== Editions ==
The original hardcover edition was published by Hutchinson in 1992 under the title Criminal Shadows: Detecting Rapists and Killers (ISBN 0091747155). Under the present title (ISBN 0002552159), it was published by HarperCollins as a hardcover in 1994 and as a paperback in 1995. Endeavor Press published the Kindle Edition E-book (ASIN: B019P27WJK) in 2015.

== Awards ==
=== 1994 ===
CWA Gold Dagger for Non-Fiction

=== 1995 ===
Anthony Award for Best True Crime

== See also ==
- FBI method of profiling
- Behavioral Analysis Unit
