= Burton Hersh =

American novelist

- Education: Harvard University
- Occupations: Author; journalist; commentator

Burton Hersh is an American author, journalist and commentator.

== Biography ==
He was graduated from Harvard Phi Beta Kappa, and studied in Germany from 1955 to 1956 as a Fulbright Scholar. He is Jewish, and he witnessed the aftermath of World War II and Nazi anti-semitism in Germany. He lived with a German family, including a man who had been a member of the Nazi Party and served in the German army during the war.

He has written numerous books and articles, and appeared often on television, including the Lehrer Report, Hardball with Chris Matthews, CNN with Paula Zahn and on The No Spin Zone with Bill O'Reilly. He served as a Special Consultant on the BBC's ten-part series on the FBI and is listed in Who's Who in America.

Hersh is a Fellow of the Aspen Institute and is a member of the Council on Foreign Relations.

== Publications ==
Hersh's articles have appeared in numerous publications including Esquire, The New York Times, The Washington Post and Huffington Post.

=== Fiction ===
- The Nature of the Beast. Tree Farms Books (2002)
  - 2003 Writers Notes Award for Best Fiction.
- The Ski People. New York: McGraw Hill (1968). OCLC 443399.

=== Nonfiction ===
- Edward Kennedy: An Intimate Biography. Berkeley, Calif.: Counterpoint (2010)
- Bobby and J. Edgar: The Historic Face-off Between the Kennedys and J. Edgar Hoover that Transformed America. New York: Carroll & Graf (2007)
- The Shadow President: Ted Kennedy in Opposition. South Royalton, Vermont: Steerforth Press (1997)
- The Old Boys: The American Elite and the Origins of the CIA. Scribner's (1992). ISBN 978-0684193489. OCLC 24173458.
- The Mellon Family: A Fortune In History. New York: Morrow (1978). ISBN 978-0688032975. OCLC 3608886.

Book of the Month Club selection and Fortune Book Club selection.

- The Education of Edward Kennedy. New York: Morrow (1972). OCLC 000324048.
