= Chandak Sengoopta =

Scholar

Chandak Sengoopta is a professor in the Department of History, Classics and Archaeology at Birkbeck College, University of London. His major research interests include the history of European medicine, the history of modern science in India and the cultural history of modern India. Sengoopta unites these interests through focus on the fundamental theme of identity and how sexual, racial and cultural identities are constructed, interpreted and disseminated in different historical contexts.

== Selected publications ==
- The rays before Satyajit: Creativity and Modernity in Colonial India, Oxford University Press– 2016
- The Most Secret Quintessence of Life: Sex, Glands, and Bodies, 1850-1950, University of Chicago Press, 2006.
- The Most Secret Quintessence of Life: Sex, Glands, and Hormones, 1850-1950, University of Chicago Press, 2006.
- Imprint of the Raj: How Fingerprinting was Born in Colonial India, Macmillan, 2003.
- Otto Weininger: Sex, Science, and Self in Imperial Vienna, University of Chicago Press, 2000.
