= Midnight in Peking =

True crime novel by Paul French

- First edition
- Author: Paul French
- Language: English
- Genre: True Crime
- Publication date: 2011

Midnight in Peking is a true crime book by English author Paul French concerning the 1937 murder of Pamela Werner in Peking, Republic of China. It was first published by Penguin Australia in association with Penguin China in 2011 and has since been published by Penguin Books in the United Kingdom and by Penguin Group USA, and has appeared on international best seller lists including the New York Times Best Seller list and the South China Morning Post Best Seller List. Additionally the book was adapted for radio by BBC Radio 4.

== Summary ==
The victim was Pamela Werner, the 19-year-old daughter of retired British diplomat and sinologist E. T. C. Werner, who lived in the Peking Legation Quarter. Her disappearance after cycling home from an evening of ice skating and the discovery of her mutilated corpse the following morning remains unsolved to this day. The expatriate community in Peking were shocked at the crime which, without specific evidence, was variously attributed to a Japanese secret society or an American organized sex ring. An Englishman resident in China claimed to have been informed by Japanese military officers that Werner's death was in retaliation for the killing of a Japanese soldier by British soldiers in a drunken brawl. Although the source was a known eccentric, British diplomats provisionally accepted this account while not taking the matter further.

== Adaptation ==
Kudos Film and Television have plans for an onscreen adaptation of Midnight in Peking as a miniseries. The Executive Producer of the TV adaptation is Ollie Madden.

== Awards ==
- 2013 Edgar Award for Best Fact Crime
- 2013 Crime Writers' Association Dagger Award for Non-Fiction
- 2013 Mystery Readers International Macavity Awards for Best Mystery Non-Fiction (nominated)
- 2012 Australian Book Industry Awards – International Success of the Year, 2012

== References and further reading ==
- Spence, Jonathan (21 March 2013), "Who Killed Pamela in Peking?" (Review of Midnight in Peking)", New York Review of Books.
