= The Boy in the River =

2012 book by Richard Hoskins

- Author: Richard Hoskins
- Language: English
- Subject: Crime, child sacrifice, murder
- Set in: London, Democratic Republic of the Congo
- Published: London
- Publisher: Pan Macmillan
- Publication date: 2012
- Publication place: United Kingdom
- Media type: Print
- Pages: 334
- Awards: Highly Commended Gold in the Crime Writers' Association Dagger Awards 2013
- ISBN: 9781447207900
- Dewey Decimal: 364.152309421

The Boy in the River is a 2012 book by the British author and criminologist Richard Hoskins about the 'Adam' murder case.

== Background ==
Hoskins lived in the Democratic Republic of the Congo from 1986 to 1992, initially on a gap year. He subsequently was married and had a daughter in the Congo, however his daughter died during his time in Africa. Hoskins was asked by the Metropolitan Police for advice and assistance after the discover of the body of a young African-descent child floating in the River Thames in London.

== Synopsis ==
The book combines Hoskins' work on the case and the various leads he follows. It is believed the murder was a ritual killing. It is discovered that the victim came from Nigeria. The book also recounts Hoskins' time in the Congo.

== Reception ==
The book was reviewed in The Economist and The Sunday Times.

BBC London had a segment on the book.
