= A Death in Belmont =

2006 book by Sebastian Junger

- Author: Sebastian Junger
- Language: English
- Subject: Boston Strangler, Belmont, Massachusetts
- Genre: Creative nonfiction
- Publisher: Harper Perennial
- Publication date: January 1, 2006
- Publication place: United States
- Pages: 288
- ISBN: 978-0060742690
- Preceded by: The Perfect Storm
- Followed by: Fire

A Death in Belmont is a creative nonfiction book written by Sebastian Junger and published by Harper Perennial in 2006.

== Summary ==
A Death in Belmont centers on the 1963 rape and murder of Bessie Goldberg. This was during the period from 1962 to 1964 of the infamous Boston Strangler crimes. Junger raises the possibility in his book that the real Strangler was Albert DeSalvo. He eventually confessed to committing several Strangler murders, but not Goldberg's. Roy Smith, an African-American man, was convicted in her death based on circumstantial evidence.

Junger suggests that Smith's conviction for Goldberg's death was influenced by racism. The prosecution called witnesses who remembered seeing Smith chiefly because he was a black man walking in a predominately white neighborhood. (Eyewitness testimony has been shown to be notoriously flawed.) Smith had cleaned Goldberg's house the day she was attacked and left a receipt (for his work) with his name on her kitchen counter. No physical evidence, such as bruises or blood, linked Smith to the crime. In 1976, he was granted commutation of his life sentence. Before he gained release, Smith died of lung cancer.

Junger draws no conclusions about the guilt or innocence of either Smith or DeSalvo.

== Criticism ==
Goldberg's daughter has vigorously disputed Junger's suggestion that Smith may have been innocent.

Defense attorney Alan Dershowitz said in his review of the book: It "must be read with the appropriate caution that should surround any work of nonfiction in which the author is seeking a literary or dramatic payoff." He noted that Junger did not include endnotes or footnotes, and suggested he may have had too much interest in "playing down coincidences and emphasizing connections."

== Reception ==
Alan Dershowitz, writing in the New York Times, called Junger a "first-rate reporter."

== Awards ==
Junger received the 2007 PEN/Winship award for the book.
