= Robyn Sisman =

American author (1949–2016)

Robyn Sisman

Robyn Ann Sisman (4 August 1949 – 20 May 2016) was a publisher and author who commissioned Robert Harris to write his 1992 novel Fatherland and produced six novels of her own.

== Selected publications ==
- Special Relationship
- Just Friends
- Perfect Strangers
- Weekend in Paris
- A Hollywood Ending
- The Perfect Couple?
