= Adam Sisman =

British writer, biographer, editor (born 1954)

Adam Sisman FRSL
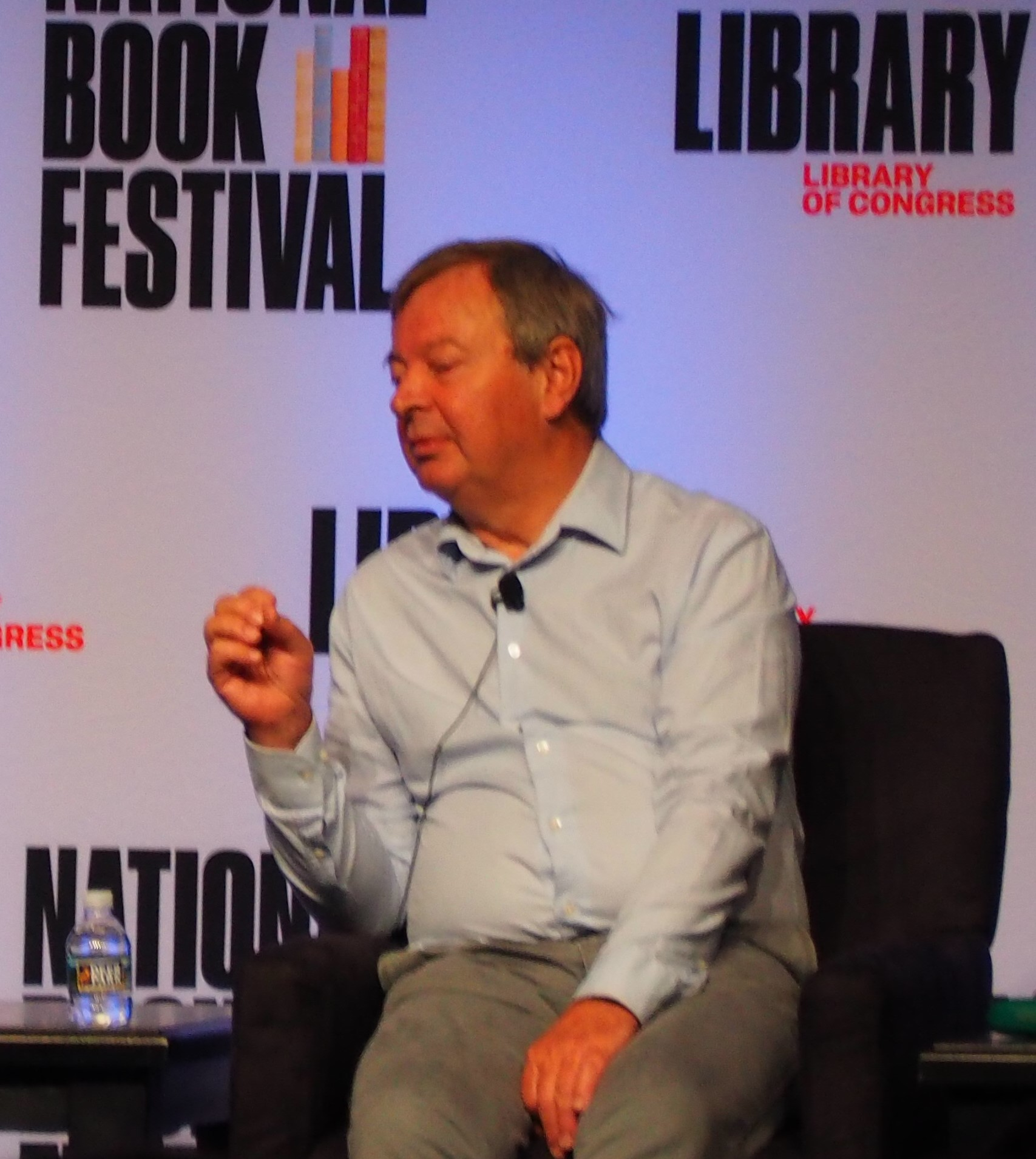
- Born: 17 March 1954 (age 72); London, England
- Education: University of Sussex
- Occupations: Writer, editor and biographer
- Spouse: Robyn Sisman (m. 1979; died 2016)
- Writing career
- Genre: Biography
- Notable awards: National Book Critics Circle Award
- Website: adamsisman.com

Adam Sisman (born 17 March 1954) is a British writer, editor and biographer. He received the National Book Critics Circle Award for his second book, Boswell's Presumptuous Task. He was elected a Fellow of the Royal Society of Literature in 2015 and is an Honorary Professor of the University of St Andrews.

== Life ==
Sisman was born in London in 1954, the eldest child of David and Marjorie Sisman. He attended St Paul's School and then the University of Sussex, where he read history. After graduating, he worked in book publishing before becoming a writer. In 1979, he married Robyn Sisman, who died in 2016. They have two daughters.

== Works ==
- A. J. P. Taylor: A Biography (1994)
- Boswell's Presumptuous Task (1999)
- Wordsworth and Coleridge: The Friendship (2006)
- Hugh Trevor-Roper (2010)
- John le Carré (2015)
- The Professor and the Parson: A Story of Desire, Deceit and Defrocking (2019)
- The Secret Life of John le Carré (2023)
- The Indefatigable Asa Briggs (2025)

As editor

- Dashing for the Post: Selected Letters of Patrick Leigh Fermor (2016)
- More Dashing: Further Letters of Patrick Leigh Fermor (2018)

As co-editor with Richard Davenport-Hines

- One Hundred Letters from Hugh Trevor-Roper (2013)
