= Adam (murder victim) =

2001 murder victim

"Adam" was the name police gave to an unidentified male child whose torso was discovered in the River Thames in London, United Kingdom, on 21 September 2001. Investigators believe the child was likely from southwestern Nigeria, and that several days before his murder, he was trafficked to the United Kingdom for a ritual sacrifice. To date, nobody has been charged with Adam's murder, and his true identity remains unknown.

== Background ==
On 21 September 2001, the torso of a young boy was discovered in the River Thames, near Tower Bridge in central London. Dubbed "Adam" by police officers, the unidentified remains belonged to a black male, around four to seven years old, who had been wearing orange girls' shorts.

The post-mortem showed that Adam had been poisoned, his throat had been slit to drain the blood from his body, and his head and limbs had been expertly removed. Further forensic testing examined his stomach contents and trace minerals in his bones to establish that Adam had only been in the United Kingdom for a few days or weeks before he was murdered, and that he likely came from a region of southwestern Nigeria near Benin City known as the birthplace of voodoo. Experts agreed that the evidence was suggestive of a ritualistic killing. Some investigators suspected that Adam was trafficked to Britain for a muti killing, a rare Southern African ritual sacrifice performed by a witch doctor that uses a child's body parts to make medicinal potions called “muti”. However, subsequent forensic analysis has lent more credence to the suggestion that the killing was part of a human sacrifice to Oshun, a deity in Yoruba religion.

== Investigation ==
Unable to find a match for Adam in databases of missing children in Britain and Europe, investigators made requests to the public for assistance. However, the story initially only received moderate publicity, due its proximity to the September 11 terrorist attacks in the United States. In the UK, coverage and interest in the case increased over the next year, and rewards were offered for information leading to the killers' conviction, or to Adam's identification. However, the story had not yet received much publicity in Nigeria.

When the investigation had reached an impasse in 2002, London officials flew to Johannesburg, South Africa, where Nelson Mandela, former President of South Africa, made a public appeal requesting any information that might be relevant to help the police in London identify Adam. Mandela's appeal was broadcast all over Africa and translated into many languages, including Yoruba, the local language in the region that investigators linked to Adam.

In 2003, London Metropolitan police travelled to South Africa to consult detectives and muti experts of the SAPS. The experts suggested that the orange shorts meant Adam was related to his killers. In Muti rituals, the colour red is the colour of resurrection: accordingly at least one of Adam's killers was related to him, and was trying to apologise to his soul, praying that he might rise again.

The police subsequently travelled to Nigeria and launched a campaign to track Adam's parents. Despite visiting elementary schools and looking at reported missing children in the region, there was no success.

=== Developments ===
On 29 March 2011, it was reported that the torso was that of a 6-year-old named Ikpomwosa, after a television crew managed to track down a woman who used to care for him in Germany, due to his parents being deported back to Nigeria. Joyce Osiagede, a mother of two, had told ITV's London Tonight that she handed the 6-year-old to a man—reportedly named Bawa—who proceeded to take the child to London. Detectives said that this was a "major breakthrough".

In February 2013, the BBC was contacted by Osiagede, who declared that she was prepared to tell them everything she knew about the boy. Osiagede revealed that Adam's real name was in fact Patrick Erhabor, and not Ikpomwosa. She also identified Bawa as Kingsley Ojo, and said that she had wrongly identified a photograph that had been circulating in the press as Patrick, when it was in fact of a friend's living son. However, police doubts about her mental state meant that these claims are doubted by detectives, and thus, Adam has never been formally identified.

The Metropolitan Police believe the publicity surrounding the case has acted as a deterrent for further ritual crimes in the United Kingdom.

== Linked cases ==
In July 2002, a Nigerian woman arrived in the United Kingdom from Germany, claiming to have fled from a Yoruba cult that practised ritual murders. She claimed that they attempted to kill her son, and that she knew Adam was murdered in London by his parents. However, police searching her flat found orange shorts with the same clothing label as those found on Adam. In December 2002, she was deported back to Nigeria.

Surveillance of the woman's associates brought the police to another Nigerian, a man named Kingsley Ojo. Searches of Ojo's house found a series of ritual items, but none of the DNA on the items matched Adam's DNA. In July 2004, Ojo was charged with child trafficking offences, and jailed for four years.

== See also ==
- Murder of Masego Kgomo
- Witchcraft accusations against children in Africa
