= Paul French (author) =

British author

Paul French (born London Borough of Enfield 27 August 1966) is a British author. In addition to articles about a range of subjects, he has specialised in books about China, including the murder mystery Midnight in Peking and the biography Her Lotus Year about Wallis Simpson in China.

== Biography ==
French was born in the London Borough of Enfield in 1966. He attended Raglan Junior School and Edmonton County School, North London. He gained an M.Phil from the University of Glasgow and studied Chinese at the City Lit. After university, French worked briefly for Time Out magazine and Euromonitor in London before relocating to Shanghai. In 1997 he co-founded the independent research firm Access Asia. It specialised in analysing Chinese consumer and retail markets. In September 2011 Access Asia was acquired by the London-based market research company Mintel. French left the company and China to become a full-time writer of articles and books about China, based in London.

== Journalism and publishing ==
French was columnist for the China Economic Quarterly and the China Economic Review. He wrote for and was China Editor of Ethical Corporation magazine. French has contributed to Foreign Policy, The Washington Post, South China Morning Post, Shanghai Daily, The Guardian, The Cleaver Quarterly and The Diplomat. French is a contributor to the UK's Real Crime magazine.

As a book reviewer, French has contributed to the (British) Literary Review, The Washington Post, The Asian Review of Books, and the Los Angeles Review of Books. He is the author of the fortnightly "Crime and the City" column for Literary Hub. French has also made contributions to the Asia Literary Review and Cha: An Asian Literary Journal. His 2023 column 'The Ultimate China Bookshelf' for The China Project was described as for those 'struggling to keep up with contemporary China affairs'.

He is a former board member of the Shanghai Foreign Correspondents Club and a member of the Korea Research Hub (KRH) based within Leeds and Sheffield universities. French was also a member of the editorial advisory board for Anthem Press's ‘China in the Twenty First Century’ series and the Honorary Research and Publications Director for the Royal Asiatic Society of Great Britain and Ireland – China Branch. In 2011 French launched the Asian Arguments series of books for Zed Booksacting as the Series Editor.

French maintains the blog China Rhyming: A gallimaufry of random China history and research interests.

=== Works by French alone ===
- North Korea The Paranoid Peninsula: A Modern History (Zed Books, 2005, updated edition, 2007)
- Carl Crow: A Tough Old China Hand – The Life, Times and Adventures of an American in Shanghai (Hong Kong University Press, 2006) Life and times of Crow.
- Through the Looking Glass: China Foreign Journalists From Opium War to Mao (Hong Kong University Press, 2009)
- The Old Shanghai A-Z (Hong Kong University Press, 2010)
- Midnight in Peking: How the Murder of a Young Englishwoman Haunted the Last Days of Old China (Beijing: Viking, 2011; London: Viking, 2012; New York: Penguin Books, Rev., 2012). ISBN 9780143121008.
- The Badlands: Decadent Playground of Old Peking (Asia and Australia: Penguin Specials, 2012; London, New York: Penguin Specials, 2013)
- North Korea: State of Paranoia (London: Zed Books, 2014). ISBN 9781780329475.
- City of Devils: The Two Men Who Ruled the Underworld of Old Shanghai (London: riverrun, 2018; New York: Picador, 2018). ISBN 9781787470330.
- Bloody Saturday: Shanghai's Darkest Day (Penguin Specials, 2018). ISBN 9780734398550
- Her Lotus Year: China, the Roaring Twenties, and the Making of Wallis Simpson (London: Elliott & Thompson; New York: St. Martin’s, 2024). ISBN 9781250287472.
- The Last Emperor of China: Twilight of the Forbidden City (London: Elliott & Thompson; New York: St. Martin’s, 2026). ISBN 9781783968626

=== Co-authored works ===
- One Billion Shoppers: Accessing Asia's Consuming Passions After the Meltdown (Nicholas Brealey Publishing, 1998) – with Matthew Crabbe
- Oil on Water: Tankers, Pirates and the Rise of China (Zed Books, 2010) – with Sam Chambers
- Fat China: How Expanding Waistlines are Changing a Nation (Anthem Press, 2010) – with Matthew Crabbe
