= Disappearance of Madeleine McCann =

Unsolved 2007 missing-person case

Madeleine McCann
- Madeleine in 2007, aged three, and forensic artist's impression of what she may have looked like in 2012, aged nine
- Born: Madeleine Beth McCann; 12 May 2003; Leicester, Leicestershire, England
- Disappeared: 3 May 2007 (aged 3); Praia da Luz, Lagos, Portugal; 37°05′19″N 08°43′51″W
- Status: Missing for 19 years, 6 months and 2 days
- Height: 90 cm (2 ft 11 in)
- Parents: Gerry McCann; Kate McCann (née Healy)
- Distinguishing features: Blonde hair; "Left eye: blue and green; right eye: green with a brown spot on the iris ... small brown spot on her left leg".
- Investigators: Polícia Judiciária, Portugal; Leicestershire Police; Metropolitan Police, London
- Contact: findmadeleine.com

On 3 May 2007, Madeleine Beth McCann, a 3‑year‑old British girl, disappeared from her bed in a holiday apartment in Praia da Luz, Lagos, Portugal. The Daily Telegraph described her disappearance as "the most heavily reported missing-person case in modern history". Madeleine's whereabouts remain unknown, although German prosecutors believe she is dead.

Madeleine was on holiday from the United Kingdom with her parents, Kate and Gerry McCann, her two-year-old twin siblings, and a group of family friends and their children. The McCann children had been left asleep at 20:30 in the ground-floor apartment while their parents dined with friends in a restaurant 55 metres (180 ft) away. The parents checked on the children about every 30–40 minutes throughout the evening, until Kate discovered Madeleine was missing at 22:00. Over the following weeks, particularly on the basis of their interpretation of a British DNA analysis, the Portuguese police came to believe that Madeleine had died in an accident in the apartment and her parents had covered it up. The McCanns were given arguido (suspect) status in September 2007, which was lifted when Portugal's attorney general archived the case in July 2008 for lack of evidence.

Madeleine's parents continued the investigation using private detectives until the Metropolitan Police opened its own inquiry, Operation Grange, in 2011. The senior investigating officer announced that he was treating the disappearance as "a criminal act by a stranger", most likely a planned abduction or burglary gone wrong. In 2013, the Met released e-fit images of men they wanted to trace, including one of a man seen carrying a child toward the beach on the night Madeleine vanished. Shortly after this, Portuguese police reopened their inquiry. Operation Grange was scaled back in 2015, but the remaining detectives continued to pursue a small number of inquiries described in April 2017 as significant. In 2020, German authorities declared Christian Brückner their prime suspect for the abduction and murder of McCann, but charges have yet to be formalised.

Madeleine's disappearance attracted sustained press coverage in the UK and internationally, reminiscent of the death of Diana, Princess of Wales, in 1997. Her parents were subjected to intense scrutiny and faced accusations of involvement in the disappearance, (Note: Involvement of the parents: Simon Foy, former head of homicide, Scotland Yard (BBC Panorama, 3 May 2017): "Even on the first glance of what we looked at, and when we took the information back and ran it through our own understanding and, you know, verified sightings and accounts and statements, and all the rest of it, it was perfectly clear to us that the McCanns themselves had nothing at all to do with the actual disappearance."; Pedro do Carmo, deputy director of the PJ (BBC Panorama, 3 May 2017): "There is no fact at this point or evidence that suggests they [the parents] were involved in Madeleine McCann's disappearance."; Mark Rowley, Scotland Yard's assistant commissioner (The Daily Telegraph, April 2017), when asked about the McCanns' involvement: "[T]here's no reason whatsoever to reopen that or to start rumours that that's a line of investigation".; Esther Addley (The Guardian, 27 April 2012): "It was, the [Portuguese] attorney general found, largely due to a catastrophic misinterpretation of the evidence collected by these officers [Leicestershire police] that the Portuguese team came to suspect the McCanns in the disappearance. ... Last month, Matt Baggott, at the time chief constable of Leicestershire, admitted to the Leveson inquiry that he had known the Portuguese officers, then heavily briefing reporters that the McCanns were guilty, were wrong on crucial DNA evidence. He could have corrected reporters' errors, even behind the scenes, he admitted, but had judged it better not to."; Brian Cathcart (New Statesman, 22 October 2008): "[T]he McCann case was the greatest scandal in our news media in at least a decade ... Error on this scale, involving hundreds of 'completely untrue' news reports, published on front pages month after month in the teeth of desperate denials, can only be systemic. Judging by what appeared in print, it involved a reckless neglect of ethical standards, a persistent failure to apply even the most basic journalistic rigour, and plenty of plain cruelty.") particularly in the tabloid press and on Twitter. In 2008, as a result of false allegations of their involvement in Madeleine's death, they and their travelling companions received damages and apologies from Express Newspapers. In 2011, the McCanns testified before the Leveson Inquiry into British press misconduct, lending support to those arguing for tighter press regulation.

== Background ==
=== Madeleine McCann ===
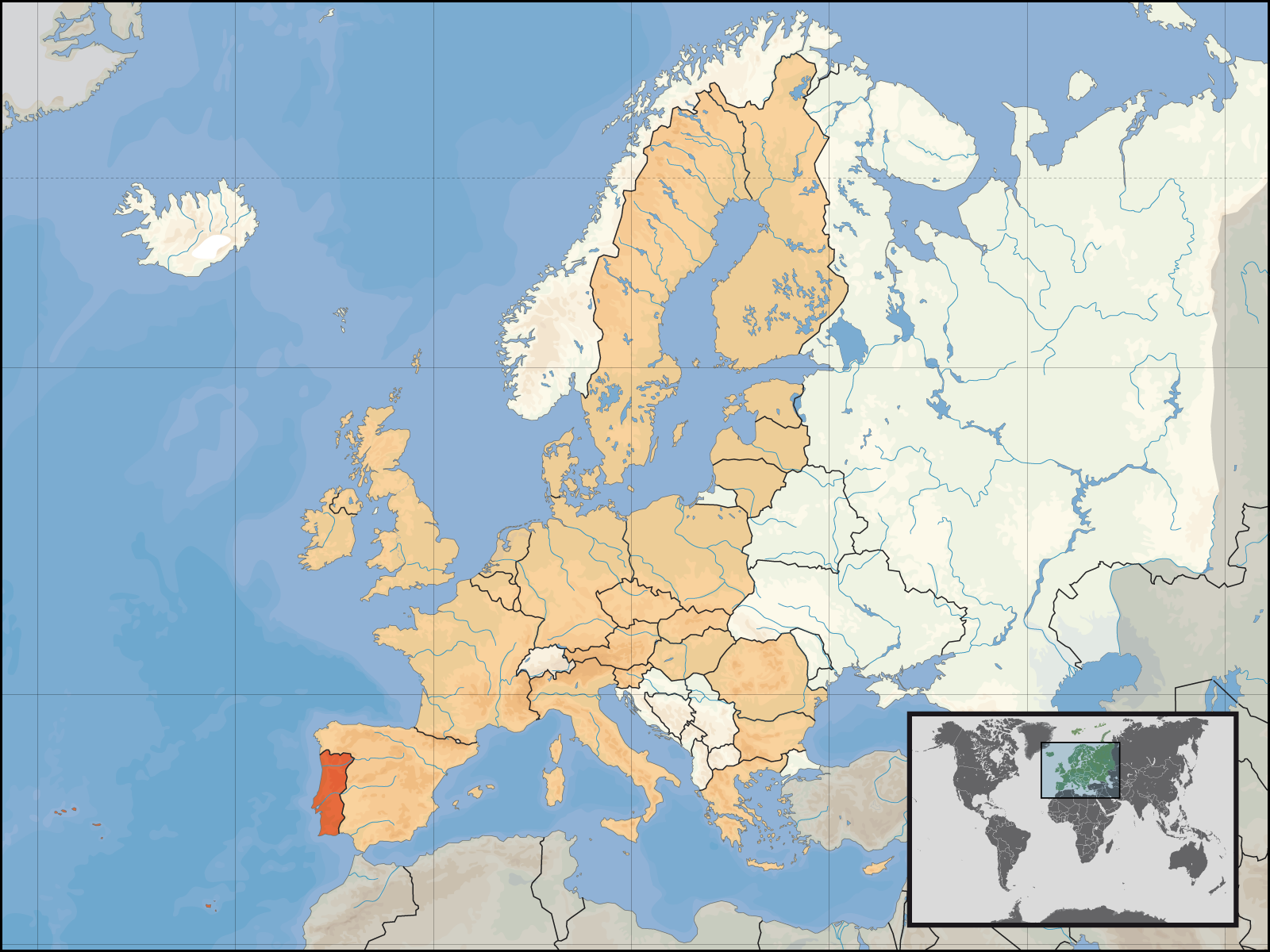
Portugal in red, Spain to the east and north, Morocco to the south

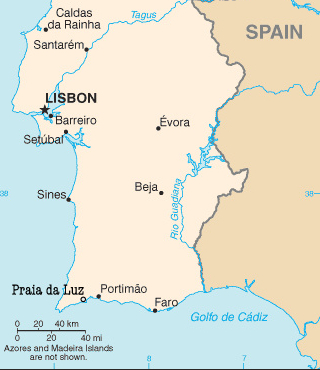
Central and southern Portugal, showing Praia da Luz and Portimão, regional headquarters of the Polícia Judiciária

Madeleine Beth McCann was born on 12 May 2003 in Leicester and lived with her family, including her younger twin siblings, a boy and a girl born in 2005, in Rothley, Leicestershire. At her parents' request, she was made a ward of court in England shortly after the disappearance, which gave the court statutory powers to act on her behalf. Police described Madeleine as blonde-haired with blue-green eyes, a small brown spot on her left calf, and a distinctive dark strip on the iris of her right eye. (Note: Gerry McCann (CNN, 11 May 2011): "[T]he technical term is coloboma, where there's a defect in the iris. I don't think it is actually. I think it's actually an additional bit of colour. She certainly had no visual problems.") In 2009, the McCanns released age-progressed images of how she may have looked at age six, and in 2012 the Metropolitan Police commissioned one of her at age nine.

=== Kate and Gerry McCann ===
Madeleine's parents are both physicians and practising Roman Catholics. Kate Marie McCann, née Healy (born 1968, Huyton, near Liverpool), attended All Saints School in Anfield, then Notre Dame High School in Everton Valley, graduating in 1992 with a degree in medicine from the University of Dundee. She moved briefly into obstetrics and gynaecology, then anaesthetics, and later general practice.

Gerald Patrick McCann (born 1968 in Glasgow) attended Holyrood R.C. Secondary School before graduating from the University of Glasgow with a BSc in physiology/sports science in 1989. In 1992, he qualified in medicine and in 2002 obtained his MD, also from Glasgow. Since 2005, he has been a consultant cardiologist at Glenfield Hospital, Leicester. The McCanns met in 1993 in Glasgow and were married in 1998.

=== "Tapas Seven" ===
The McCanns were on holiday with seven friends and eight children in all, including the McCanns' three. The nine adults dined together most evenings at 20:30 in the resort's tapas restaurant, as a result of which the media dubbed the friends the "Tapas Seven". The report of one of the group, Jane Tanner, that she saw a man carry a child away from the resort 45 minutes before Madeleine was reported missing, became one of the most-discussed aspects of the case.

=== Resort ===
The McCanns arrived on 28 April 2007 for their seven-night spring break in Praia da Luz, a village in Portugal's Algarve region with a population of 1,000, known as "Little Britain" because of the concentration of British homeowners and holidaymakers. They had booked through the British holiday company Mark Warner Ltd, and were placed in 5A Rua Dr Agostinho da Silva, an apartment owned by a retired teacher from Liverpool, one of several privately owned properties the company rented.

5A was a two-bedroom ground-floor apartment in the fifth block of a group of apartments known as Waterside Village, which lay on the perimeter of part of Mark Warner's Ocean Club resort. Matthew and Rachel Oldfield were next door in 5B, Jane Tanner and Russell O'Brien in 5D, and the Paynes and Dianne Webster on the first floor. Located on the corner of Rua Dr Agostinho da Silva and Rua Dr Francisco Gentil Martins, 5A was accessible to the public from two sides. Sliding glass patio doors in the living room at the back overlooked the Ocean Club's pool, tennis courts, tapas restaurant, and bar. The patio doors could be accessed via a public street, Rua Dr Francisco Gentil Martins, where a small gate and set of steps led to 5A's balcony and living room. 5A's front door was on the opposite side of the block from the Ocean Club, on Rua Dr Agostinho da Silva.

The McCanns' children slept in a bedroom next to the front door, which the McCanns kept locked. The bedroom had one waist-high window with curtains and a metal exterior shutter, the latter controlled by a cord inside the window; the McCanns kept the curtains and shutter closed throughout the holiday. The window overlooked a narrow walkway and residents' car park, which was separated from the street by a low wall. Madeleine slept in a single bed next to the bedroom door, on the opposite side of the room from the window; the twins were in travel cots in the middle of the room. There was another single bed underneath the window.

== Disappearance ==
Locations
1 Tapas restaurant, Ocean Club.
2 McCann apartment, Ocean Club, 5A Rua Dr Agostinho da Silva that Gerry checked at 21:05.
3 21:15 Jane Tanner sighting, junction of Rua Dr Francisco Gentil Martins and Rua Dr Agostinho da Silva.
4 22:00 Mary and Martin Smith sighting, Rua da Escola Primária 500 yards (460 m) from the McCanns' apartment, walking away from the Ocean Club and towards Rua 25 de Abril and the beach.

=== Daytime: McCann family activities ===
Thursday, 3 May 2007 was the penultimate day of the family's holiday. Over breakfast Madeleine asked: "Why didn't you come when [my brother] and I cried last night?" After the disappearance, her parents wondered whether this meant someone had entered the children's bedroom. Her mother also noticed a large brown stain on Madeleine's pyjama top.

The children spent the morning in the resort's Kids' Club, then the family ate lunch at their apartment before heading to the pool. Kate took the last known photograph of Madeleine at 14:29 that afternoon, sitting by the pool next to her father and two-year-old sister. The children returned to the Kids' Club, then at 18:00 their mother took them back to 5A, while their father went for a tennis lesson. The McCanns put the children to bed at around 19:00. Madeleine was left asleep in short-sleeved, pink-and-white Marks and Spencer's Eeyore pyjamas, next to her comfort blanket and a soft toy, Cuddle Cat.

=== 20:30: Tapas restaurant ===
At 20:30 the parents left 5A to dine with their friends in the Ocean Club's open-air tapas restaurant, located on the other side of the pool. 5A lay about 55 metres (180 ft) from the restaurant as the crow flies, but to reach the restaurant, one needed to walk along a public street to reach the doors of the Ocean Club resort, and then go through the resort to the other side of the pool, a distance of about 82 metres (269 ft). The top of the apartment was visible from the tapas restaurant, but not the doors. The patio doors could be locked only from the inside, so the McCanns left them closed but unlocked, with the curtains drawn, so they could let themselves in that way when checking on the children. There was a child-safety gate at the top of the steps from the patio and a low gate at the bottom, which led to the street.

The resort's staff had left a note in a message book at the swimming-pool reception area, asking that the same table, which overlooked the apartments, be block-booked for 20:30 for the McCanns and friends every evening for the last four evenings of the holiday. The message said the group's children were asleep in the apartments. Kate believes the abductor may have seen the note. The McCanns and their friends left the restaurant roughly every half-hour to check on their children. Gerry carried out the first check on 5A at around 21:05. The children were asleep and all was well, except that he recalled having left the children's bedroom door slightly ajar, and now it stood almost wide open. He pulled it nearly closed again before returning to the restaurant.

=== 21:15: Tanner sighting ===
Artist's impression of the man Jane Tanner saw, released October 2007; Scotland Yard believe it was an uninvolved British tourist carrying his daughter.

The sighting by Jane Tanner, one of the Tapas Seven, of a man carrying a child that night, became an important part of the early investigation. Tanner had left the restaurant just after 21:00 to check on her own daughter, passing Gerry on Rua Dr Francisco Gentil Martins on his way back to the restaurant from his 21:05 check. He had stopped to chat to a British holidaymaker, but neither man recalled having seen Tanner. This puzzled the Portuguese police, given how narrow the street was, and led them to accuse Tanner of having invented the sighting.

Tanner told the police that at around 21:15 she had noticed a man carrying a young child walk across the junction of Rua Dr Francisco Gentil Martins and Rua Dr Agostinho da Silva just ahead of her. He was not far from Madeleine's bedroom, heading east, away from the front of apartment 5A. In the early days of the investigation, the direction in which he was walking was thought to be important because he was moving toward the home of Robert Murat, the 33-year-old British-Portuguese man who lived near 5A, and who became the case's first suspect.

The child in the man's arms was wearing light-coloured pink pyjamas with a floral pattern and cuffs on the legs, similar to Madeleine's. Tanner described the man as white, dark-haired, 5 ft 7 in (1.70 m) tall, of southern European or Mediterranean appearance, 35–40 years old, wearing gold or beige trousers and a dark jacket, and said he did not look like a tourist. According to Kate, Tanner passed the information to Portuguese police as soon as Madeleine was reported missing, but they did not pass the description to the media until 25 May. Madeleine's Fund hired a forensic artist to create an image of the man, which was released in October 2007.

The sighting became important because it offered investigators a time frame for the abduction, but Scotland Yard came to view it as a red herring. In October 2013, they said that a British holidaymaker, Julian Totman, had been identified as the man Tanner had seen; he had been returning to his apartment after collecting his daughter from the Ocean Club night creche. Scotland Yard took photographs of the man wearing the same or similar clothes to the ones he was wearing on the night, and standing in a pose similar to the one Tanner reported. The pyjamas his daughter had been wearing also matched Tanner's report. Operation Grange's lead detective, Detective Chief Inspector Andy Redwood, said they were "almost certain" the Tanner sighting was not related to the abduction.

=== 22:00: Smith sighting ===
E-fit images of the Smith sighting, released by Scotland Yard in 2013

The rejection of the Tanner sighting as crucial to the timeline allowed investigators to focus on another sighting of a man carrying a child on the night of Madeleine's disappearance, this one reported to Portuguese police on 26 May 2007 by Martin and Mary Smith, who had been in Praia da Luz on holiday from Ireland. Scotland Yard concluded in 2013 that the Smith sighting offered the approximate time of Madeleine's kidnapping.

The Smiths saw the man at around 22:00 on Rua da Escola Primária, 500 yards (460 m) from the McCanns' apartment, walking away from the Ocean Club and towards Rua 25 de Abril and the beach. He was carrying a girl aged 3–4 years. She had blonde hair and pale skin, was wearing light-coloured pyjamas, and was barefoot. The man was mid-30s, 5 ft 7 in– 5 ft 9 in (1.70 m– 1.75 m), slim-to-normal build, with short brown hair, wearing cream or beige trousers. He did not look like a tourist, according to the Smiths, and had seemed uncomfortable carrying the child. E-fits based on the Smiths' testimony were first created in 2008 by Oakley International, private investigators hired by the McCanns, and were publicised in 2013 by Scotland Yard on the BBC programme Crimewatch.

=== 22:00: Reported missing ===
Kate had intended to check on the children at 21:30, but Matthew Oldfield, one of the Tapas Seven, offered to do it when he checked on his own children in the apartment next door to 5A. He noticed that the McCanns' children's bedroom door was wide open, but after hearing no noise, he left 5A without looking far enough into the bedroom to see whether Madeleine was there. He could not recall whether the bedroom window and its exterior shutter were open at this point. Early on in the investigation, Portuguese police accused Oldfield of involvement because he had volunteered to do the check, suggesting to them that he had handed Madeleine to someone through the bedroom window.

Kate made her own check of 5A at around 22:00. Scotland Yard stated in 2013 that Madeleine was probably taken moments before this. Kate recalled entering the apartment through the unlocked patio doors at the back and noticing that the children's bedroom door was wide open. When she tried to close the door, it slammed shut as though there was a draught, which is when she saw that the bedroom window and its shutter were open. Madeleine's Cuddle Cat and blanket were still on the bed, but Madeleine was gone. After briefly searching the apartment, Kate ran back towards the restaurant, screaming, "Madeleine's gone! Someone's taken her!"

At around 22:10, Gerry sent Matthew Oldfield to ask the resort's reception desk to call the police, and at 22:30 the resort activated its missing-child search protocol. Sixty staff and guests searched until 04:30, at first assuming that Madeleine had wandered off. One of them told Channel 4's Dispatches that, from one end of Praia da Luz to the other, searchers calling Madeleine's name could be heard.

== Early response ==
=== Portuguese police ===
Two officers from the gendarmerie, the Guarda Nacional Republicana (GNR), arrived at the resort at 23:10 from Lagos, 5 miles (8.0 km) away. At midnight, after briefly searching, they alerted the criminal police, the Polícia Judiciária (PJ), in nearby Portimão. Kate recounted that the PJ arrived just after 01:00. According to the PJ, they arrived within 10 minutes of being alerted. At 02:00 two patrol dogs were brought to the resort, and at 08:00 four search and rescue dogs. Police officers had their leave cancelled and started searching waterways, wells, caves, sewers, and ruins around Praia da Luz. Inspector Gonçalo Amaral, head of the PJ in Portimão, became the inquiry's coordinator.

It was widely acknowledged that mistakes were made during the so-called "golden hours" soon after the disappearance. Neither border nor marine police were given descriptions of Madeleine for many hours, and officers did not make house-to-house searches. According to Kate, roadblocks were first put in place at 10:00 the next morning. Police did not request motorway surveillance pictures of vehicles leaving Praia da Luz the night of the disappearance, or of the road between Lagos and Vila Real de Santo António on the Spanish border. Euroscut, the company that monitors the road, said they were not approached for information. It took Interpol five days to issue a global missing-person alert. Not everyone in the resort at the time was interviewed; holidaymakers later contacted the British police to say that no one had spoken to them.

The crime scene was not secured. Portuguese police took samples from Madeleine's bedroom, which were sent to three forensic labs. It was reported on 1 June 2007 that DNA from one "stranger" had been found, but around 20 people had entered apartment 5A before it was closed off, according to Chief Inspector Olegário de Sousa of the PJ. According to Kate, an officer placed tape across the doorway of the children's bedroom, but left at 03:00 without securing the apartment. The PJ case file, released in 2008, showed that 5A lay empty for a month after the disappearance, then was let out to tourists before being sealed off in August 2007 for more forensic tests. A similar situation arose outside the apartment when a crowd gathered by the front door of 5A, including next to the children's bedroom window – through which an abductor may have entered or left – trampling on evidence. An officer dusted the bedroom window's exterior shutter for fingerprints without wearing gloves or other protective clothing.

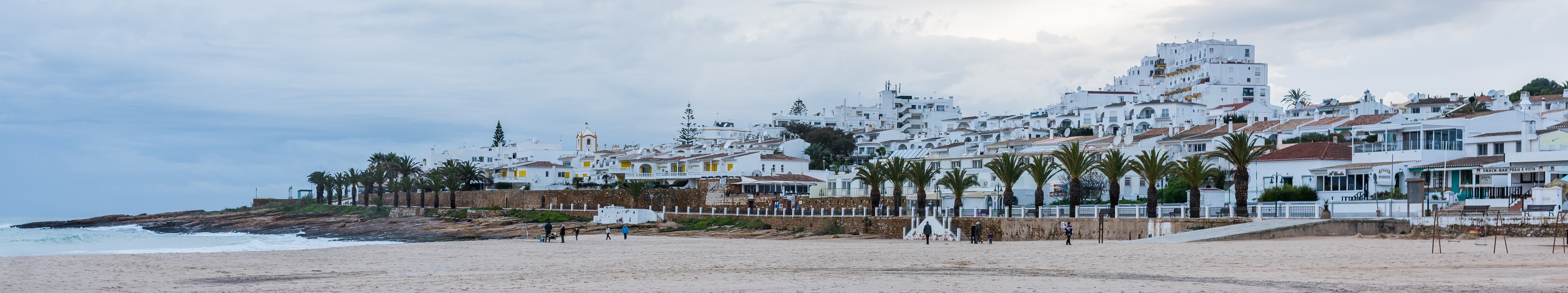
Panoramic view of Praia da Luz, February 2015

=== British police ===
In the United Kingdom it was agreed that Madeleine's home force, Leicestershire Police – led by Chief Constable Matt Baggott – would coordinate the British response, although it remained a Portuguese inquiry. A strategic coordinating group, or "gold" group, was put together, representing Leicestershire Police, the Serious Organised Crime Agency (SOCA), the Child Exploitation and Online Protection Centre (CEOP), and the National Police Improvement Agency (NPIA). The PJ gave a British team a room in which to work, but apparently resented their presence. British police were used to feeding their data into HOLMES 2 (the Home Office Large Major Enquiry System); in Portugal, the information was collected in boxes. In addition the PJ had less autonomy than police in the UK, often having to wait for magistrates' decisions, which slowed things down. In an interview for Anthony Summers's and Robbyn Swan's book Looking for Madeleine (2014), Jim Gamble, head of CEOP at the time, said Portuguese police felt they were being condescended to, and that the British were acting as a "colonial power".

=== Media and PR ===
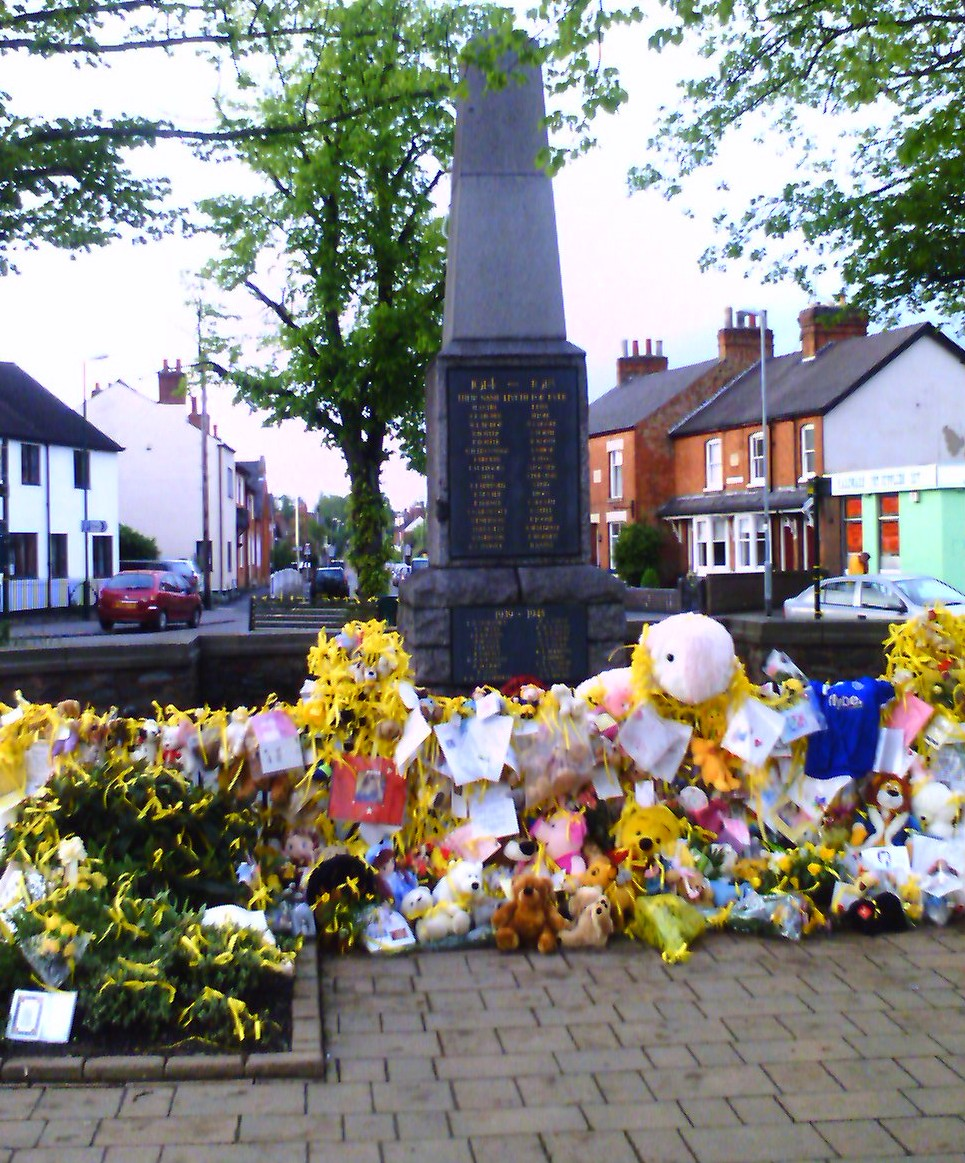
Tribute in Rothley, the McCanns' home town, on 17 May 2007

A PJ officer acknowledged in 2010 that Portuguese police had been suspicious of the McCanns from the start because of the "media circus". Gerry told Vanity Fair in 2008 that he had decided to "market" Madeleine to keep her in the public eye. To that end, a string of public relations consultants arrived in Praia da Luz, deeply resented by the local police, who saw the media attention as counterproductive. Alex Woolfall of the British PR firm Bell Pottinger, representing Mark Warner Ltd, dealt with the media for the first ten days, then the British government sent in press officers. This was apparently unprecedented.

The first government press officer was Sheree Dodd, a former Daily Mirror journalist, who was followed by Clarence Mitchell, director of media monitoring for the Central Office of Information. When the government withdrew Mitchell, the McCanns hired Justine McGuinness, who was reportedly headhunted for the job. When she left, Hanover Communications took over briefly, headed by Charles Lewington, formerly John Major's private secretary. In September 2007, Brian Kennedy of Everest Windows stepped forward as a benefactor and offered to cover Mitchell's salary so that he could return. Mitchell resigned from his government position and started working for the McCanns full-time; he was later paid by Madeleine's Fund.

The McCanns set up Madeleine's Fund: Leaving No Stone Unturned Ltd on 15 May 2007 to raise money and awareness; its website attracted 58 million hits in the first two days. Throughout May and June the couple's PR team arranged events to sustain media interest in the case, including a visit to the Portuguese city of Fátima as well as trips to Holland, Germany, Spain, and Morocco. On 30 May 2007, accompanied by reporters, the couple flew to Rome – in Sir Philip Green's Learjet – to meet Pope Benedict XVI, a visit arranged by Cardinal Cormac Murphy-O'Connor, the Archbishop of Westminster. The following month balloons were let off in 300 cities around the world.

By early June, journalists were voicing concerns: the "sheer professionalism of it ... troubled journalists", according to Matthew Parris. Placing Madeleine on the front page of a British newspaper would sell up to 30,000 extra copies. She appeared on the cover of People magazine on 28 May 2007, on the front page of several British tabloids every day for almost six months, and as one of Sky News's menu options: "UK News", "Madeleine", "World News". Between May 2007 and July 2008, the Portuguese tabloid Correio da Manhã published 384 articles about Madeleine. By June 2008 a search for her name on YouTube returned over 3,680 videos and seven million comments.

== First Portuguese inquiry (2007–2008) ==
=== First arguido ===
Twelve days after Madeleine's disappearance, Robert Murat, a 34-year-old British-Portuguese property consultant, became the first arguido (suspect) in the case. Born in Hammersmith, West London, Murat lived in his mother's house, Casa Liliana, 150 yards (140 m) from apartment 5A in the direction in which the man in the Tanner sighting had walked. He was named a suspect after a Sunday Mirror journalist told Portuguese police he had been asking about the case. The PJ had briefly signed Murat up as an official interpreter; he said he had wanted to help because he had a daughter in England around Madeleine's age.

Three members of the Tapas Seven, Fiona Payne, Russell O'Brien, and Rachael Oldfield, said they had seen Murat outside apartment 5A shortly after the disappearance, as did an Ocean Club nanny and two British holidaymakers. This would not have been surprising considering how close Murat lived to 5A, but he and his mother said he had been at home all evening. The McCann circle was clearly suspicious of Murat: one of the McCanns' supporters offered BBC reporter Richard Bilton "exclusive access to any new developments in the case" if Bilton would report back what the press pack was saying about Murat. Beginning on 15 May 2007, Murat's home was searched; the pool drained; his cars, computers, phones and video tapes examined; his garden searched using ground radar and sniffer dogs; and two of his associates questioned. In March 2008, one of those associates had his car set ablaze, with the word fala ("speak") sprayed in red on the pavement.

There was nothing to link Murat or his friends to the disappearance, and Murat's arguido status was lifted on 21 July 2008 when the case was archived. In April 2008 he received £600,000 in out-of-court settlements for libel in what The Observer said was the largest number of separate libel actions brought in the UK by the same person in relation to one issue; his friends received £100,000 each. In July 2014, during Operation Grange, one of those friends was questioned again as a witness, this time by the PJ on behalf of Scotland Yard. In December that year Murat and his wife were questioned, also on behalf of Scotland Yard, along with eight others. In 2017 Murat's mother added her voice to those who had witnessed suspicious events around 5A that night: she told the BBC that she had driven past apartment 5A that night and had seen a young woman in a plum-coloured top behaving suspiciously just outside it, information she said she passed to the police at the time. She also said she had seen a small brown rental car speeding toward the apartment, driving the wrong way down a one-way street.

=== Witness statements ===
In statements to the PJ, witnesses described men behaving oddly near apartment 5A in the days before the disappearance and on the day itself. Scotland Yard came to believe that these men may have been engaged in reconnaissance for an abduction or burglary. There had been a fourfold increase in burglaries between January and May 2007, including two in the McCanns' block in the seventeen days before the disappearance, during which burglars had entered through windows.

Several witnesses reported men collecting for charity. On 20 April, a bedraggled-looking man asked a tourist in her apartment near 5A for money for an orphanage in nearby Espiche; apparently there were no orphanages or similar in or near Espiche at the time. The witness described the man as pushy and intimidating. On 25 or 26 April, the tourist who rented apartment 5A before the McCanns found a man on his balcony who had entered via the steps from the street. Polite and clean-shaven, the visitor asked for money for an orphanage. On the day of the disappearance, 3 May, there were four charity collections by two men in the streets around 5A. At 4:00 p.m. two black-haired men approached a British homeowner looking for funds for a hostel or hospice in or near Espiche, and at 5:00 p.m two men approached another British tourist with a similar story.

An "ugly" blond-haired man was seen on 2 May across the road from 5A, apparently watching it; he had also been seen on 29 April near the Ocean Club. On 30 April the granddaughter of 5A's former owners saw a blond-haired man leaning against a wall behind the apartments, and saw him again on 2 May near the tapas restaurant, looking at 5A. She described him as Caucasian, mid-30s, with short cropped hair, and "ugly" with spots. On or before the day of the disappearance, a man was seen staring at the McCanns' block, where a white van was parked. In the late afternoon of 3 May, a girl on the balcony of the apartment above 5A saw a man leave through the gate below, as though he had come out of a ground-floor apartment; what caught her attention was that he looked around before shutting the gate quietly, with both hands. At 14:30 two blond-haired men were seen on the balcony of 5C, an empty apartment two doors from 5A. At 16:00–17:00 a blond-haired man was seen near 5A. At 18:00 the same or another blond-haired man was seen in the stairwell of the McCanns' block. At 23:00, after the disappearance, two blond-haired men were seen in a nearby street speaking in raised voices. When they realised they had been noticed, they reportedly lowered their voices and walked away.

=== McCanns as arguidos ===
==== Early suspicion ====
The first indication that the media were turning against the McCanns came on 6 June 2007, when a German journalist asked them during a Berlin press conference whether they were involved in the disappearance. On 30 June a 3,000-word article entitled "The Madeleine Case: A Pact of Silence" appeared in Sol, a Portuguese weekly, stating that the McCanns were suspects, highlighting alleged inconsistencies between their statements and implying that the Tanner sighting had been invented. The reporters had obtained the Tapas Sevens' mobile numbers and that of another witness, so it was apparent that the inquiry had a leak.

This and later articles in the Portuguese press, invariably followed up in the UK, made several allegations, based on no evidence, which would engulf the McCanns for years on social media. They included that the McCanns and Tapas Seven were "swingers", that the McCanns had been sedating their children, and that the group had formed a "pact of silence" regarding what had happened on the night of the disappearance. Much was made of apparent inconsistencies within and between the McCanns' and Tapas Seven's statements. The police had asked the group questions in Portuguese, and an interpreter had translated the replies. According to Kate, the statements were then typed up in Portuguese and verbally translated back into English for the interviewees to sign.

Among the inconsistencies was whether the McCanns had entered the apartment by the front or back door when checking on the children. According to the PJ case file, Gerry stated during his first interview, on 4 May 2007, that the couple had entered 5A through the locked front door for his 21:05 and her 22:00 checks, and in a second interview, on 10 May, that he had entered through the unlocked patio doors at the back. (The patio doors could be unlocked only from inside, so the parents had left them unlocked to let themselves in.) There was also an inconsistency about whether the front door had been locked. Gerry told The Sunday Times in December 2007 that they had used the front door earlier in the week, but it was next to the children's bedroom, so they had started using the patio doors instead. The PJ also questioned why, when Kate discovered Madeleine was missing, she had run to the tapas restaurant leaving the twins alone in 5A, when she could have used her mobile phone or shouted to the group from 5A's rear balcony.

Another issue was whether the exterior shutter over Madeleine's bedroom window could be opened from outside. According to journalist Danny Collins, the shutter was made of non-ferrous metal slats on a roller blind that was housed in a box at the top of the inside window, controlled by pulling on a strap. Once rolled down, the slats locked in place outside the window and could be raised only by using the strap on the inside. Kate said the shutter and window were closed when Madeleine was put to bed, but open when she discovered Madeleine was missing. Gerry told the PJ that, when he was first alerted to the disappearance, he had lowered the shutter, then had gone outside and discovered that it could be raised only from the outside. Against this, Portuguese police said the shutter could not be raised from the outside without being forced, but there was no sign of forced entry; they also said forcing the shutter open would have caused a lot of noise.

The apparent discrepancies contributed to the view of the PJ that there had been no abduction. Kate's shout of "they've taken her" was viewed with suspicion, as though she had been trying to lend credence to a false abduction story. Particularly from August onwards, these suspicions developed into the theory that Madeleine had died in apartment 5A as a result of an accident – perhaps after being sedated to help her stay asleep – and that her parents had hidden her body for a month, before retrieving her and driving her to an unknown place in a car they had hired over three weeks after the disappearance. In 2010, Carlos Anjos, former head of the Police Detectives Union in Portugal, told the BBC programme Panorama that most Portuguese investigators still believed Madeleine had died as a result of an accident in the apartment.

==== Portugal sends a letter rogatory ====
On 28 June 2007, the McCanns suggested to the PJ that the police request help from Danie Krugel, a South African former police officer who had developed a "matter orientation system", a handheld device that he claimed could locate missing people using DNA and satellites. On hearing about this years later, one scientist said it had caused his "BS detector to go off the scale". Kate wrote in 2011 that Krugel's claims made no sense, but the couple were desperate. In the second week of June they sent Krugel hair and eyelashes from Madeleine collected from the McCann family home by relatives in the UK. Krugel arrived in Praia da Luz on 15 July and told the McCanns his equipment had picked up a "static signal" in an area of the beach near the Rocha Negra cliff.

The officer in charge of the PJ inquiry, Inspector Gonçalo Amaral, interpreted Kate's support of Krugel as a ploy. By this point he believed the McCanns were involved in the disappearance and that Kate was using Krugel – she had also considered using psychics – to "disclose the location of her daughter's body" without compromising herself. With this in mind, the PJ sent a letter rogatory to the British police to ask for assistance in their search for Madeleine's body.

In response, Mark Harrison, the national search adviser for the NPIA, arrived in Praia da Luz, walked around the search areas, and flew over them by helicopter. Describing Krugel's ideas as "highly unlikely", Harrison's report, dated 23 July 2007, said that 100 officers had searched up to 9.3 miles (15 km) around Praia da Luz, but that the officer in charge and most of the team had no training in search procedures, with the exception of a search-and-rescue team from Lisbon. Search dogs had been used, but after five days instead of within two days as the handlers recommend. Harrison suggested searching the beach and shoreline, an open area near the village, Robert Murat's property, apartment 5A, the Tapas Seven's apartments, and any hired vehicles. He recommended using ground-penetrating radar and bringing in Keela and Eddie, two Springer spaniel sniffer dogs from South Yorkshire.

==== British sniffer dogs arrive ====
Keela was a forensic investigation dog trained to give her handler a "passive alert" to the scent of human blood by placing her nose close to the spot, then freezing in that position. Eddie was an enhanced-victim-recovery dog (EVRD, or cadaver dog) who gave a "bark alert" to the scent of human cadavers, including shortly after the death of the subject, even if the remains were buried, incinerated, or in water; he was trained to bark only in response to that scent and not for any other reason.

The dogs arrived in Praia da Luz on 31 July 2007 and were taken to apartment 5A, nearby wasteland, and the beach. Both dogs alerted behind the sofa in the living room of 5A, and Eddie gave an alert near the wardrobe in the main bedroom. There were no alerts on the beach or wasteland. The PJ obtained warrants to search the house the McCanns had rented on Rua das Flores, and the silver Renault Scénic the couple had hired 24 days after Madeleine went missing. The house and grounds were searched on 2 August. The only alert was from Eddie when he encountered Cuddle Cat, which was lying in the living room; Keela did not give an alert. The police left with boxes of the McCanns' clothes, Cuddle Cat, a pair of latex gloves, suitcases, a notepad, two diaries – including one that Kate had started after the disappearance – and a friend's Bible she had borrowed. A passage the Bible's owner had marked from 2 Samuel, about the death of a child, was copied into the police case file along with a Portuguese translation. The items were taken to another location, where Eddie alerted his handler to one of the boxes of clothes. A source close to the McCanns' lawyers told reporters that, if there was indeed a smell of corpses on Kate's clothes, it could have been caused by her contact with corpses as a family doctor.

The police removed the Renault and, on 6 August, Keela and Eddie were taken to an underground car park opposite the PJ headquarters in Portimão, where ten cars were parked, 20–30 feet apart, including the McCanns' and Murat's. Eddie, the cadaver dog, gave an alert outside the McCanns' car by the driver's door. The next morning Keela alerted to the rear driver's side inside the boot (trunk in North American English) and the map compartment in the driver's door, which contained the ignition key and key ring. When the key ring was hidden underneath sand in a fire bucket, she alerted again, as she did when the bucket was moved to a different floor of the car park. Almost immediately the Portuguese press began running stories that Madeleine had died inside apartment 5A.

==== British DNA analysis ====
Hair and other fibres were collected from areas in the car and apartment 5A where Keela and Eddie had given alerts, and were sent to the Forensic Science Service (FSS) in Birmingham for DNA profiling, arriving around 8 August 2007. At this point, according to The Sunday Times, the PJ "abandoned the abduction theory". On 8 August, without waiting for the results from Birmingham, Portuguese police called the McCanns to a meeting in Portimão, where Guilhermino Encarnação, PJ regional director, and Luis Neves, coordinator of the Direcção Central de Combate ao Banditismo in Lisbon, told them the case was now a murder inquiry. When Encarnação died of stomach cancer in 2010, The Daily Telegraph identified him as a major source of the leaks against the McCanns. Both the McCanns were interrogated that day; the officers suggested that Kate's memory was faulty.

The FSS used a technique known as low copy number (LCN) testing. Used when only a few cells are available, the test is controversial because it is vulnerable to contamination and misinterpretation. On 3 September, John Lowe of the FSS emailed Detective Superintendent Stuart Prior of the Leicestershire Police, the liaison officer between the British and Portuguese authorities. Lowe told Prior that a sample from the car boot contained fifteen out of nineteen of Madeleine's DNA components, and that the result was "too complex for meaningful interpretation":

A complex LCN [low copy number] DNA result which appeared to have originated from at least three people was obtained from cellular material recovered from the luggage compartment section [...] Within the DNA profile of Madeleine McCann there are 20 DNA components represented by 19 peaks on a chart [...] Of these 19 components 15 are present within the result from this item; there are 37 components in total. There are 37 components because there are at least 3 contributors, but there could be up to five contributors. In my opinion therefore this result is too complex for meaningful interpretation/inclusion [...] [W]e cannot answer the question: Is the match genuine, or is it a chance match. (Note: The email from John Lowe (Forensic Science Service, 3 September 2007) continued: "The individual components in Madeleine's profile are not unique to her; it is the specific combination of 19 components that makes her profile unique above all others. Elements of Madeleine's profile are also present within the profiles of many of the scientists here in Birmingham, myself included. It's important to stress that 50% of Madeleine's profile will be shared with each parent. It is not possible, in a mixture of more than two people, to determine or evaluate which specific DNA components pair with each other. ... Therefore, we cannot answer the question: Is the match genuine, or is it a chance match.")

==== McCanns made arguidos ====
Lowe's email was translated into Portuguese on 4 September 2007. The next day, according to Kate, the PJ proposed that, if she were to admit that Madeleine had died in an accident in the apartment and that she had hidden the body, she might only serve a two-year sentence. Her husband would not be charged and would be free to leave. Both parents were given arguido status on 7 September, and were advised by their lawyer not to answer questions. The PJ told Gerry that Madeleine's DNA had been found in the car boot and behind the sofa in apartment 5A. Gerry did respond to questions, but Kate declined to reply to 48 questions she was asked during an eleven-hour interview.

The DNA evidence was a "100 percent match", journalists in Portugal were told. British tabloid headlines included "Corpse in McCann Car" (London Evening Standard, 16 October 2007), while the Daily Star reported that a "clump of Maddie's hair" had been found in the car. The leaks came directly from Portuguese police, according to testimony in 2012 from Jerry Lawton, a Daily Star reporter, to the Leveson Inquiry. (Note: Jerry Lawton, Daily Star (Leveson Inquiry, 19 March 2012): "Portuguese police leaked in briefings in Portugal to their journalists that the forensic test results positively showed that Madeleine had been in or linked her to the hire car that her parents didn't hire until three or four weeks after she'd disappeared, and that story became a—created a sea change, without overusing that word, in the way the story has been looked at. "Those forensic test results became a bone of contention between the UK and the Portuguese police. I was present when a Portuguese team of forensic experts and detectives arrived in Leicester to discuss these results. Of course, they'd already leaked a version of the results. Leicestershire police presumably knew—although it turns out obviously that those test results did not prove that and that the Portuguese police had somehow misinterpreted these results. I just felt that had this been—that Leicestershire police could have briefed, off the record, even unreportable, that the Portuguese police had misinterpreted those DNA results. ... "Every time you rang Leicestershire police on that inquiry—and it was a lot, from every media organisation—you were told: 'It's a Portuguese police inquiry. You'll have to contact the Portuguese police.' And of course, they were fully aware that the Portuguese police had judicial secrecy laws and they wouldn't talk about the case.") Matt Baggott of the Leicestershire Police told the inquiry that, because the Portuguese were in charge of the case, he had made a decision not to correct reporters; his force's priority, he said, was to maintain a good relationship with the PJ with a view to finding Madeleine. (Note: Matt Baggott, former chief constable of Leicestershire Police (Leveson Inquiry, 28 March 2012): "[A]s a chief constable at the time, there were a number of I think very serious considerations. One for me, and the Gold Group who were running the investigation, which was a UK effort, was very much a respect for the primacy of the Portuguese investigation. We were not in the lead in relation to their investigative strategy. We were merely dealing with enquiries at the request of the Portuguese and managing the very real issues of the local dimension of media handling, so we were not in control of the detail or the facts or where that was going. "I think the second issue was there was an issue, if I recall, of Portuguese law. Their own judicial secrecy laws. I think it would have been utterly wrong to have somehow in an off the record way have breached what was a very clear legal requirement upon the Portuguese themselves.... "There was also an issue for us of maintaining a very positive relationship with the Portuguese authorities themselves. I think this was an unprecedented inquiry in relation to Portugal. The media interest, their own reaction to that. And having a very positive relationship of confidence with the Portuguese authorities I think was a precursor to eventually and hopefully one day successfully resolving what happened to that poor child. "So the relationship of trust and confidence would have been undermined if we had gone off the record in some way or tried to put the record straight, contrary to the way in which the Portuguese law was configured and their own leadership of that.")

==== McCanns return to the UK, Almeida report ====
Despite their arguido status, the McCanns were allowed to leave Portugal, and on legal advice did so immediately, arriving back in England on 9 September 2007. The following day Chief Inspector Tavares de Almeida of the PJ in Portimão signed a nine-page report concluding that Madeleine had died in apartment 5A as a result of an accident, that the restaurant meal and apparent regular checks on the McCann children had been part of the cover-up, that the Tapas Seven had helped to mislead the police, and that the McCanns had concealed the child's body before faking an abduction. An eleven-page document from the Information Analysis Brigade in Lisbon analysed alleged discrepancies in the McCanns' statements. On 11 September the public prosecutor, José Cunha de Magalhães e Meneses, handed the ten-volume case file to a judge, Pedro Miguel dos Anjos Frias. Meneses applied for the seizure of Kate's diary and Gerry's laptop. The police also wanted to trace telephone calls between the McCanns and the Tapas Seven, and there were details in the report about the number of suitcases the McCanns and their friends had taken back to England.

On 28 September 2007, according to a leaked diplomatic cable, the United States ambassador to Portugal, Al Hoffman, wrote about a meeting he had had with the British ambassador to Portugal, Alexander Ellis, on 21 September 2007. The cable said: "Without delving into the details of the case, Ellis admitted that the British police had developed the current evidence against the McCann parents, and he stressed that authorities from both countries were working co-operatively. He commented that the media frenzy was to be expected and was acceptable as long as government officials keep their comments behind closed doors."

Control Risks, a British security company— paid by an anonymous donor to assist the McCanns since 7 May 2007— took hair samples from the McCann twins on 24 September 2007, at their parents' request. The twins had slept through the commotion in apartment 5A after Madeleine was reported missing; Kate wrote that she was concerned the abductor might have given the children sedatives. According to the PJ files, Kate had asked them to take samples, three months after the disappearance, but they had not done so. Control Risks took a sample from Kate too, to rebut allegations that she was on medication. No trace of drugs was found.

=== Gonçalo Amaral's removal, later developments ===
On 2 October 2007 Chief Inspector Gonçalo Amaral was removed from his post as the inquiry's coordinator and transferred to Faro after telling the newspaper Diário de Notícias that British police had pursued only those leads helpful to the McCanns. As an example, he criticised their decision to follow up an anonymous email to Prince Charles that claimed a former Ocean Club employee had taken Madeleine.

Amaral was himself made an arguido one day after Madeleine's disappearance, in relation to his investigation of another case, the disappearance of Joana Cipriano. The following month he was charged with making a false statement, and four other officers were charged with assault. Eight-year-old Joana Cipriano had vanished in 2004 from Figueira, seven miles (11 km) from Praia da Luz. Her body was never found, and no murder weapon was identified. Cipriano's mother and uncle were convicted of her murder after confessing, but the mother retracted her confession, saying she had been beaten by police. Amaral was not present when the beating is alleged to have taken place, but he was accused of having covered up for others. The other detectives were acquitted. Amaral was convicted of perjury in May 2009 and received an eighteen-month suspended sentence.

The McCann inquiry was taken over by Paulo Rebelo, deputy national director of the PJ, which expanded its team of detectives and began a case review. On 29 November 2007 four members of the Portuguese inquiry, including Francisco Corte-Real, vice-president of Portugal's forensic crime service, were briefed at Leicestershire Police headquarters by the FSS. In April 2008 the Tapas Seven were interviewed in England by the Leicestershire Police, with the PJ in attendance.

The PJ planned in December 2007 to hold a reconstruction in Praia da Luz, using the McCanns and Tapas Seven rather than actors, but the Tapas Seven declined to participate. The poor relationship between the McCanns and Portuguese police was evident again that month when, on the day the couple were at the European Parliament to promote a monitoring system for missing children, transcripts of their interviews with the PJ were leaked to Spanish television. The national director of the PJ, Alípio Ribeiro, resigned not long after this, citing media pressure; he had publicly said the police had been hasty in naming the McCanns as suspects. As of May 2008 Portuguese prosecutors were examining several charges against the McCanns, including child abandonment, abduction, homicide, and concealment of a corpse.

=== Inquiry closed (21 July 2008) ===
On 21 July 2008 the Portuguese Attorney General, Fernando José Pinto Monteiro, announced that there was no evidence to link the McCanns or Robert Murat to Madeleine's disappearance. Their arguido status was lifted and the case was closed. On 4 August, Portugal's Ministério Público released seventeen case files containing 11,233 pages on CD-ROM to the media, including 2,550 pages of sightings. (Note: In July the McCanns went to the High Court in London to gain access to 81 pieces of information Leicestershire police held about the sightings, before Portugal released the case files.) The files included a 58-page prosecutors' report, which concluded: "No element of proof whatsoever was found which allows us to form any lucid, sensible, serious, and honest conclusion about the circumstances." In 2009 Portugal released a further 2,000 pages. Days after the case closed, excerpts from Kate's diary, which had been taken by the PJ in August 2007, were published in translation by a Portuguese tabloid, Correio da Manhã, despite a Portuguese judge's ruling in June 2008 that the seizure had been a privacy violation and that any copies must be destroyed. On 14 September 2008, a News International tabloid, News of the World, published the extracts, again without permission and now improperly translated back into English.

=== Amaral's book (24 July 2008) ===
The lingering tensions between the McCanns and the PJ had reached such a height that Amaral resigned from the force in June 2008 to write a book alleging that Madeleine had died in an accident in the apartment, and that to cover it up, the McCanns had faked an abduction. Three days after the case closed, Amaral's book, Maddie: A Verdade da Mentira ("Maddie: The Truth of the Lie"), was published in Portugal by Guerra & Paz. By November 2008 it had sold 180,000 copies and by 2010 had been translated into six languages. A documentary based on the book was broadcast on TVI in Portugal in April 2009, watched by 2.2 million viewers.

The McCanns began a libel action against Amaral and his publisher in 2009. Madeleine's Fund covered the legal fees. In 2015 they were awarded over €600,000 in libel damages; Amaral's appeal against that decision succeeded in 2016. A judge had issued an injunction against further publication or sales of the book in 2009, but the Lisbon Court of Appeal overturned the ban in 2010, stating that it violated Amaral's freedom of expression. The ban was reinstated in 2015 as part of the libel ruling, then lifted when Amaral's appeal succeeded in 2016. The McCanns appealed the 2016 decision to Portugal's Supreme Court, but the court ruled against them in February 2017. In their 76-page ruling, the judges wrote that the McCanns had not, in fact, been cleared by the archiving of the criminal case in 2008. In March 2017, the Supreme Court rejected the McCanns' final appeal.

== Madeleine's Fund inquiry (2007–2011) ==
=== Raising money ===
The McCanns set up Madeleine's Fund: Leaving No Stone Unturned Limited on 15 May 2007, twelve days after the disappearance. Over 80 million people visited the fund's website in the three months after the disappearance. From September 2007, Brian Kennedy of Everest Windows supported the couple financially, and Kennedy's lawyer joined the fund's board of directors. As of February 2017 it had seven directors, including the McCanns.

Appeals by public figures were screened at football matches across the UK. Between May 2007 and March 2008, the fund received £1,846,178, including £1.4 million through the bank, £390,000 online, and £64,000 from merchandise. (Note: £815,000 was spent during this period, including £250,000 on private detectives, £123,573 on the campaign, and £111,522 on legal costs.) Donations included £250,000 from the News of the World, £250,000 from Sir Philip Green, $50,000 from Simon Cowell, and $25,000 from Coleen Rooney. J. K. Rowling and Richard Branson also made large donations; Branson donated £100,000 to the McCanns' legal fund. Madeleine's Fund did not cover the couple's legal costs arising from their status as arguidos, but it was criticised in October 2007 for having made two of the McCanns' mortgage payments, before they were made arguidos. A reward of £2.5 million was also offered, including from the News of the World, Rowling, Branson, Green, and a Scottish businessman, Stephen Winyard.

In March 2008, Express Newspapers paid the fund £550,000 and £375,000 in libel damages arising out of articles about the McCanns and the Tapas Seven, respectively. In 2011, Kate McCann's book, Madeleine, was serialised by The Sunday Times and The Sun, both owned by News International, for a payment to the fund of £500,000 to £1 million. In December 2015, the fund stood at around £750,000.

=== Private investigators ===
Madeleine's Fund hired several firms of private investigators, causing friction with Portuguese police. Shortly after the disappearance, an anonymous benefactor paid for the services of a British security company, Control Risks. There had reportedly been four independent sightings from North Africa; Brian Kennedy went to Morocco himself in September 2007 to look into one. A Norwegian woman had reported seeing a girl matching Madeleine's description in a petrol station near Marrakesh, Morocco, on 9 May 2007; the child had reportedly asked the man she was with, in English, "Can we see Mummy soon?" When the witness returned home to Spain, she learned about the disappearance and telephoned the Spanish police. A month later, according to Kate, the police had still not formally interviewed the woman, which led the McCanns to fear that leads were not being pursued. The McCanns themselves travelled to Morocco on 10 June 2007 to raise awareness. They spent the night at the British ambassador's residence and were briefed by consular staff and a Metropolitan Police attaché.

Kennedy hired a Spanish agency, Método 3, for six months at £50,000 a month, which put 35 investigators on the case in Europe and Morocco. The relationship came to an end in part because the head of the agency made several public statements that concerned the McCanns, including to CBS that, "We know the kidnapper. We know who he is and how he has done it." Another private investigator was David Edgar, a retired detective inspector hired in 2009 on the recommendation of the head of Manchester's Serious Crime Squad. Edgar released an e-fit that August of a woman said to have asked two British men in Barcelona, shortly after the disappearance, whether they were there to deliver her new daughter. Other private initiatives included a Portuguese lawyer financing the search of a reservoir near Praia da Luz in February 2008, and the use of ground radar by a South African property developer, Stephen Birch, who said in 2012 that scans showed there were bones beneath the driveway of a house in Praia da Luz.

=== Oakley International ===
In 2008, Madeleine's Fund hired Oakley International, a Washington, D.C.-registered detective agency, for over £500,000 for six months. Oakley sent a five-man team to Portugal led by Henri Exton, a former British police officer who had worked for MI5. The Oakley team engaged in undercover operations within the Ocean Club and among paedophile rings and the Roma community.

Exton questioned the significance of the Tanner sighting, and focused instead on the sighting by Martin and Mary Smith of a man carrying a child toward the beach. The Oakley team produced e-fits based on the Smiths' description. This was a sensitive issue, because Martin had recently watched BBC coverage of the McCanns's arrival in the UK from Portugal, at the height of public debate about their alleged involvement. As Gerry exited the aircraft with his son in his arms, Smith believed he recognised him as the man he had seen carrying the child in Praia da Luz. He reported his suspicion to the Leicestershire Police but later came to accept that he was mistaken: at 22:00 witnesses placed Gerry in the tapas restaurant. Nevertheless, publication of the Smith e-fits, which bore some resemblance to Gerry, would have fed the conspiracy theories about the McCanns.

Exton submitted his report to Madeleine's Fund in November 2008 and suggested releasing the e-fits, but the fund told Exton that the report and its e-fits had to remain confidential. The relationship between the company and the fund had soured, in part because of a dispute over fees, and in part because the report was critical of the McCanns and their friends: it suggested that Madeleine may have died in an accident after letting herself out of the apartment through its unlocked patio doors. Madeleine's Fund passed the e-fits to the police – the PJ and the Leicestershire Police had them by October 2009, and Scotland Yard received them when they became involved in August 2011 – but did not otherwise release them. Kate did not include them with the other images of suspects in her book, Madeleine (2011), although she suggested that both the Tanner and Smith sightings were crucial.

Scotland Yard released the e-fits in October 2013 for a BBC Crimewatch reconstruction. After it had aired, The Sunday Times published that the McCanns had had the e-fits since 2008. In response, the couple complained that the Sunday Times story implied (wrongly) that they had not only failed to publish the e-fits but had withheld them from the police. The newspaper published an apology on an inside page in December 2013. The McCanns subsequently sued and received £55,000 in damages, which Gerry said would be donated to charity.

== Further police inquiries (2011–present) ==
=== Gamble report ===
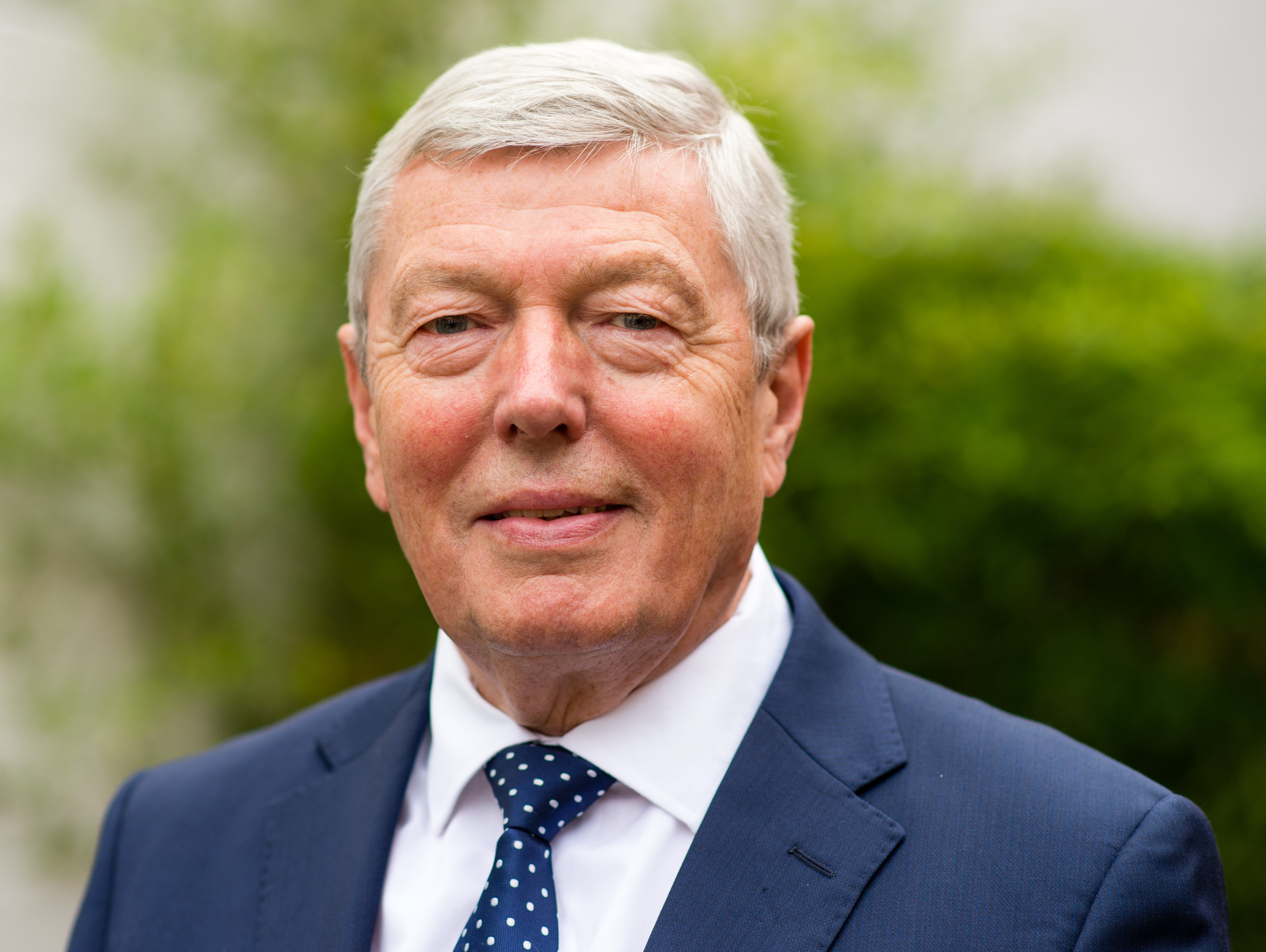
Alan Johnson, British Home Secretary (2009–2010)

The McCanns met the British Home Secretary Alan Johnson in 2009 to request a review of the case. Johnson commissioned a scoping report from Jim Gamble of CEOP. By March 2010, the Home Office had begun discussions with the Association of Chief Police Officers (ACPO) about setting up a British inquiry.

Delivered in May 2010, the Gamble report examined how several British agencies had become involved in the search for Madeleine, including CEOP itself, the Leicestershire Police, the Metropolitan Police Service, SOCA, the NPIA, Crimestoppers, the Home Office, Foreign Office, and 10 Downing Street. Gamble criticised the lack of coordination; everyone had wanted to help, and some had wanted "to be seen to help", he wrote, which had "created a sense of chaos and a sense of competition" hampering the inquiry by causing resentment among the Portuguese police. He recommended renewed cooperation between the British and Portuguese authorities; that all relevant information be exchanged between the police forces; that police perform an analysis of telephone calls made on the night of the disappearance; and that all leads be pursued, including those developed by private detectives.

=== Operation Grange ===
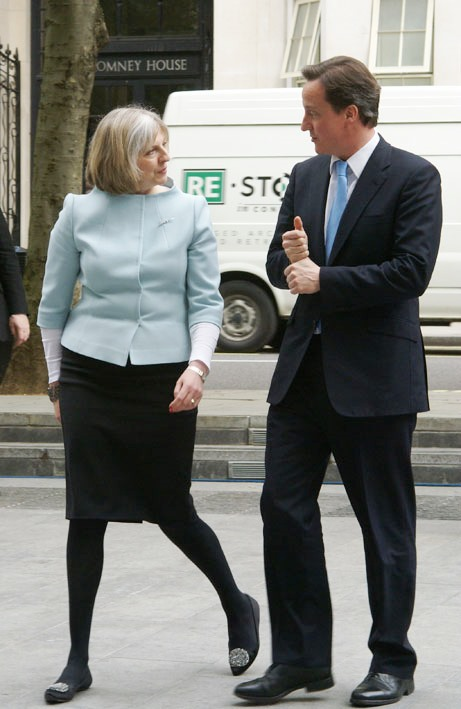
Theresa May (then home secretary) with David Cameron (then prime minister) in 2010

In May 2011, under Home Secretary Theresa May, Scotland Yard launched an investigative review, Operation Grange, with a team of 29 detectives and eight civilians. The announcement of the review appeared to have been triggered by a News International campaign by way of The Sun. The issue of whether this request was the result of "threats" or "persuasion" from News International chief executive Rebekah Brooks was one of the issues raised at the Leveson Inquiry.

On 11 May 2011, as it was serializing Kate's book, Madeleine, the front page of The Sun hosted an open letter from the McCanns in which they asked Prime Minister David Cameron to set up a new inquiry; 20,000 people signed the newspaper's petition that day. On the same day, according to her testimony to the Leveson Inquiry, May spoke by telephone, at her instigation, to Brooks and Dominic Mohan, editor of The Sun. The next day she wrote to the commissioner of the Metropolitan Police, Sir Paul Stephenson, to say that Portuguese police had agreed to cooperate with a British inquiry. Within 24 hours, Cameron made the announcement about Operation Grange, to be financed by a Home Office contingency fund.

Operation Grange was led by Commander Simon Foy. Detective Chief Inspector Andy Redwood of Scotland Yard's Homicide and Serious Crime Command was the first senior investigating officer, reporting to Detective Chief Superintendent Hamish Campbell. The team consisted of three detective inspectors, five detective sergeants, nineteen detective constables, and around six civilian staff. By July 2013 the review had become an investigation. When Redwood retired in 2014, he was replaced by DCI Nicola Wall.

The team had tens of thousands of documents translated, released an age-progressed image, and investigated over 8,000 potential sightings. By 2015 they had taken 1,338 statements, collected 1,027 exhibits, and investigated 650 sex offenders and 60 persons of interest. The inquiry was scaled back in October 2015 and the number of officers reduced to four. The Home Secretary approved an additional £95,000 of funding in April 2016 for what the Metropolitan Police Commissioner, Sir Bernard Hogan-Howe, said was one remaining line of inquiry. Another £85,000 was approved to cover up to September 2017, and £150,000 to cover until 31 March 2019, taking the cost of the inquiry to £11.75 million. The Home Office said it would approve similar funding for 2019.

In September 2025, the Metropolitan Police requested an interview with Brückner ahead of his release from a German prison, but he declined.

==== Funding ====
In September 2018, the Home Office announced: "We have received and are considering a request from the Metropolitan Police Service to extend funding for Operation Grange until the end of March 2019". Up to that month, Operation Grange had cost £11.6m. In November 2018, an extra £150,000 is granted to continue the investigation, the latest in a series of six-month extensions which took the cost of Operation Grange to an estimated £11.75m. June 2019, the British government said it would fund Operation Grange until March 2020.

In May 2024, the Home Office confirmed that up to £192,000 had been approved for Operation Grange for the 2024–25 financial year, supporting a part-time team comprising three police officers and one staff member. This brought the total cost of the investigation to £13.2 million as of 31 March 2024. In 2025, ministers approved a further £108,000 to continue the inquiry into the 2025–26 financial year.

=== Theories: Planned abduction, burglary, wandered off ===
DCI Redwood made clear that Operation Grange was looking at a "criminal act by a stranger", most likely a planned abduction or a burglary that Madeleine had disturbed. There had been a fourfold increase in local burglaries between January and May 2007, including two in the McCanns' block in the seventeen days before the disappearance, during which intruders had entered through windows. In an interview in April 2017, just before the tenth anniversary of the disappearance, Scotland Yard's Assistant Commissioner, Mark Rowley, appeared to dismiss the burglary hypothesis, while adding that it was "not entirely ruled out". Referring to the suspects who might have been involved in burglaries in the area, he said that police had "pretty much closed off that group of people". The remaining detectives were focusing on a small number of inquiries that they believed were significant. Also that month there were claims that Scotland Yard was looking for a woman seen near 5A at the time of the disappearance.

Redwood said in 2013 that, "on one reading of the evidence", the disappearance did look like a pre-planned abduction, which "undoubtedly would have involved reconnaissance". Several witnesses described men hanging around near apartment 5A in the days before the disappearance and on the day itself. In May 2013, Scotland Yard wanted to trace twelve manual workers who were at the Ocean Club when Madeleine disappeared, including six British cleaners in a white van who were offering their services to British expats. In October 2013 Scotland Yard and Crimewatch staged a reconstruction—broadcast in the UK, the Netherlands and Germany—during which they released e-fits of the men seen near 5A and of the Smith sighting. Days after Crimewatch aired, Portugal's attorney general reopened the Portuguese inquiry, citing new evidence.

Another theory is that Madeleine, nearly four at the time, left the apartment by herself, perhaps to look for her parents, and was abducted by a passerby or fell into one of the open construction sites nearby. This is widely regarded as unlikely. According to her mother, Madeleine would have had to open the unlocked patio doors, close the curtains behind her, close the door again, open and close the child gate at the top of the stairs, then open and close the gate leading to the street.

=== Tracking mobile phone calls ===
Using mobile-phone tracking techniques, and with the cooperation of over thirty countries, police traced who had used cell phones near the scene of Madeleine's disappearance within the important time frame. The analysis turned up several calls and texts near the Ocean Club between a 30-year-old former Ocean Club bus driver, and his 24-year-old and 53-year-old associates. Detectives interviewed them in June 2014; they denied any connection to the disappearance. Police also found that the cell phone of Euclides Monteiro, a former Ocean Club restaurant worker who had previously been fired for theft, had been used near the resort that night. Originally from Cape Verde, Monteiro died in 2009 in a tractor accident. The suspicion was that he had been breaking into apartments to finance a drug habit; his widow said he had been questioned previously about break-ins involving the sexual assault of children but had been cleared by DNA evidence.

=== Holiday-home sexual assaults ===
Scotland Yard issued another appeal in March 2014 for information about a man who had entered holiday homes occupied by British families in four incidents in the western region of Algarve between 2004 and 2006, two of them in Praia da Luz. On those occasions he had sexually assaulted five girls, aged 7–10, in their beds. The man spoke English with a foreign accent and his speech was slow and perhaps slurred. He had short, dark, unkempt hair, tanned skin, and in the view of three victims a distinctive smell; he may have worn a long-sleeved burgundy top, perhaps with a white circle on the back. These were among twelve incidents reported in the area between 2004 and 2010. The PJ reportedly believed the intruder in the four incidents between 2004 and 2006 was Monteiro.

=== Searches and interviews in Praia da Luz ===
In June 2014, officers from Scotland Yard and the PJ, accompanied by archaeologists and sniffer dogs, searched drains and dug in 60,000 square metres (15 acres) of wasteland in Praia da Luz. Nothing was found. The following month, at Scotland Yard's request, the PJ in Faro interviewed four Portuguese citizens, with Scotland Yard in attendance. No evidence was found to implicate them. One man, an associate of Robert Murat, was first questioned shortly after the disappearance. Pedro do Carmo, deputy director of the PJ, told the BBC that the interviews had been conducted only because Scotland Yard had requested them.

Eleven people, including three Britons, were interviewed in December 2014. According to Portuguese media, Scotland Yard compiled 253 questions for the interviewees, including, "Did you kill Madeleine?" and, "Where did you hide the body?" Robert Murat, his wife, and her ex-husband were questioned, as were the former Ocean Club bus driver and his two associates who had telephoned or texted each other near the Ocean Club around the time of the disappearance. They admitted to having broken into Ocean Club apartments but denied having taken Madeleine.

=== German investigations in 2020 and 2025 ===
In June 2020, German prosecutors stated that they have "concrete evidence" that Christian Brückner (Note: Born on 7 December 1976, he is also known simply as "Christian B" under German privacy laws.) killed McCann. However, formal charges against Brückner by the court in Braunschweig have been delayed due to confusion over where his last address in Germany was and thus which German court is responsible for the trial. Brückner has previously been convicted of unrelated counts of child sexual abuse and drug trafficking, and has since 2019 served a prison sentence in Germany for raping a 72-year-old American pensioner in the Algarve region. He was scheduled for release in September 2025. He was tried in 2024 in relation to five unrelated sexual offenses committed in Portugal between 2000 and 2017, and acquitted of those charges by a court in Braunschweig on 8 October 2024. On 22 April 2022, Brückner was given arguido status by the Portuguese authorities, meaning they could extradite him to Portugal for formal questioning.

Brückner, who is believed to have been living in a borrowed VW camper van in the Algarve region at the time of Madeleine's disappearance, was ordered to be investigated regarding possible involvement by the public prosecutor in the Braunschweig court. The German Federal Criminal Police Office (BKA) made a public appeal for information relating to the McCann case on Aktenzeichen XY… ungelöst, a crime programme broadcast by the public television station ZDF. German police stated that they received useful information in 2013 after the case was first featured on Aktenzeichen XY, but that it took years to find substantial evidence for prosecution, and that they still need more information. The prosecutors asked the public for information about Brückner's phone number and a number that had dialled him on the day of the disappearance, with which Brückner's number had a 30-minute connection.

A British woman who had been Brückner's girlfriend at the time reported that the night before the abduction he had told her: "I have a job to do in Praia da Luz tomorrow. It's a horrible job but it's something I have to do and it will change my life. You won't be seeing me for a while." Brückner's car, a Jaguar XJR6, was registered to a new owner the day after Madeleine disappeared. Hans Christian Wolters, from the public prosecutor's office, stated that they were starting proceedings, under the presumption that Madeleine was dead, due to Brückner's criminal record.

On 27 July 2020, German police began searching an allotment in Hanover in connection with the investigation. In October 2021, the Mirror reported that Wolters had become convinced that Brückner abducted and murdered Madeleine. From 23 to 25 May 2023, Portuguese, German and British police conducted a search of an area just over a 1 mile (1.6 km) long for possible evidence in the case. The area was on a peninsula near the Arade Dam and the city Silves about 31 miles (50 km) from where McCann was last seen on 3 May 2007. Previously, a child's sock had been found in the searched area in 2008. The search was upon request from Wolters with support from the BKA and coordinated by the deputy director of Polícia Judiciária's Northern Directorate. According to cell phone geolocating, the cell phone of Brückner was near McCann within 5 minutes of her disappearance. German investigators believe it to be possible that Brückner killed McCann around the dam and threw her into the water.

Between 3 and 5 June 2025, the German Police, with the permission and cooperation of Portuguese authorities, conducted a search of scrubland and abandoned buildings between Praia da Luz and the cottage where Brückner lived at the time of the disappearance. The search involved heavy machinery, including JCBs, and ground-penetrating radar. On 17 September 2025, Brückner was released from Sehnde prison after serving a seven-year sentence for a rape committed in Portugal's Algarve region. As part of his terms of release, he was ordered to wear an electronic tag and surrender his passport. Brückner first moved to Kiel, then arrived in Neumünster before negative publicity forced him to leave for his own safety. By early October 2025, Brückner was living on social welfare payments of €1,000 a month while constantly moving between motels and homeless shelters all over Germany.

=== Other inquiries ===
In the early days of the inquiry, Portuguese police searched through images seized from paedophile investigations, and Madeleine's parents were shown photographs of sex offenders in case they recognised them from Praia de Luz. Several British paedophiles were of interest. In May 2009, investigators working for the McCanns tried to question one, Raymond Hewlett; he had allegedly told someone he knew what happened to Madeleine, but he retracted his statement and died of cancer in Germany in December of that year. Scotland Yard made inquiries about two paedophiles who had been in jail in Scotland for murder since 2010; the men had been running a window-cleaning service in the Canary Islands when Madeleine went missing.

A man from Northern Ireland who died in 2013 was discussed in the media in connection with the disappearance: after being released from prison for the sexual assault of his four daughters, he had moved to the Portuguese town of Carvoeiro, approximately 40 kilometres (25 mi) from Praia da Luz; he was there when Madeleine went missing. Another focus of Operation Grange was Urs Hans von Aesch, a deceased Swiss man implicated in the 2007 murder, in Switzerland, of five-year-old Ylenia Lenhard. Ylenia disappeared on 31 July 2007, nearly three months after Madeleine, and was found dead in September as a result of toluene poisoning. Von Aesch was living in Spain when Madeleine disappeared. In June 2016, Operation Grange officers interviewed an alleged victim of the deceased broadcaster Clement Freud, who was accused that year of having a history of child sexual abuse. Freud had had a home in Praia da Luz and had befriended the McCanns in July 2007, several weeks after the disappearance. Freud's family said he had been in the UK when Madeleine went missing.

== Tabloids and social media ==
=== "Trial by media" ===
Eilis O'Hanlon wrote that the disappearance "could almost stand as a metaphor for the rise of social media as the predominant mode of public discourse". Twitter, one year old when Madeleine McCann went missing, became the source of much of the vitriol. Ten years later, the "#McCann" hashtag was still producing over 100 tweets an hour, according to researchers at the University of Huddersfield. Social media's attacks included a threat to kidnap one of the McCanns' twins, and when Scotland Yard and Crimewatch staged their reconstruction in 2013, there was apparently talk of phoning in with false information to sabotage the appeal. One man who ran an anti-McCann website received a three-month suspended sentence in 2013 after leafleting their village with his allegations. The following year a Twitter user was found dead from a helium overdose after Sky News confronted her about her 400 anti-McCann tweets.

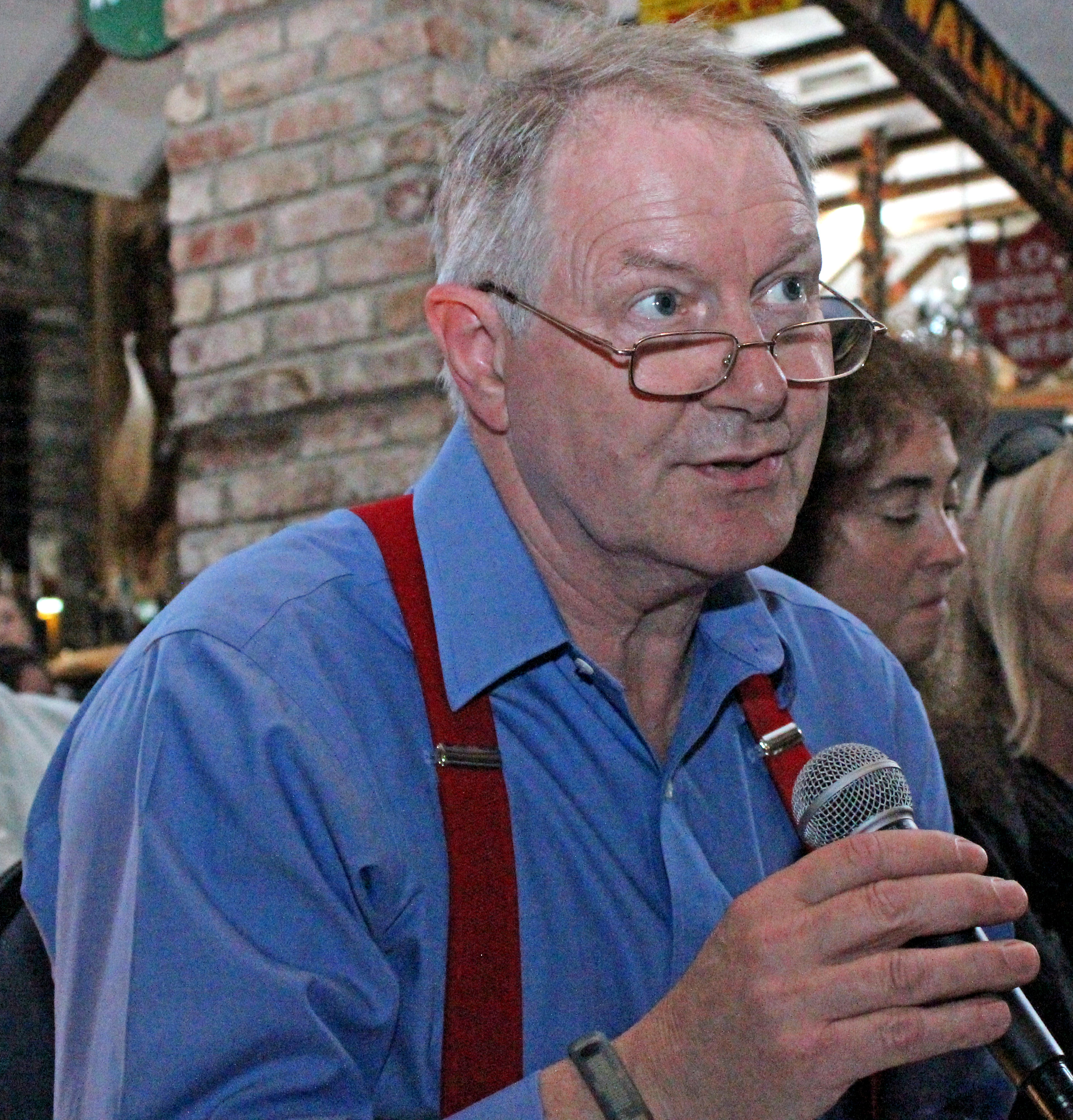
Roy Greenslade called the Daily Express coverage a "sustained campaign of vitriol".

At first, the couple's status as photogenic, articulate, and professional was beneficial. Offers of help came in from across the United Kingdom, including 10 Downing Street. The McCanns took full advantage of the interest by hiring public relations consultants and offering regular events to sustain media interest. However, the frenzy eventually turned against the couple, and there began what PR consultant Michael Cole called the "monstering of the McCanns". They were harshly criticised for having left their children alone in an unlocked apartment, despite the availability of Ocean Club babysitters and a crèche; the argument ran that a working-class couple would have faced child abandonment charges. Seventeen thousand people signed an online petition in June 2007 asking Leicestershire Social Services to investigate how the children came to be left unattended.

Kate's appearance and demeanour were widely discussed, with much of the commentary coming from other women, including Booker Prize–winner Anne Enright in the London Review of Books. Kate was deemed cold and controlled, too attractive, too thin, too well-dressed, or too intense. She had apparently been advised by abduction experts not to cry on camera because the kidnapper might enjoy her distress, and this led to more criticism: the Portuguese tabloid Correio da Manhã cited sources complaining that she had not "shed a single tear". Journalism professor Nicola Goc argued that Kate had joined a long list of mothers deemed killers because of unacceptable maternal behaviour. Commentators compared her experience to that of Lindy Chamberlain, convicted of murder after her baby was killed by a dingo. Like Kate, she was suspected, in part, because she had not wept in public. There was even a similar (false) story about supposedly relevant Bible passages the women were said to have highlighted. Chamberlain asked: "How can you apologise to me and do this again to someone else?"

In November 2011, the McCanns testified before the Leveson Inquiry into British press standards. The inquiry heard that Peter Hill, the editor of the Daily Express, in particular, had become "obsessed" with the couple. Express headlines included that Madeleine had been "killed by sleeping pills", "Find body or McCanns will escape", and "'McCanns or a friend must be to blame'", the latter based on an interview with a waiter. "Maddie 'Sold' by Hard-Up McCanns" ran a headline in the Daily Star, part of the Express group. Lord Justice Leveson called the articles "complete piffle". Roy Greenslade described them as "no journalistic accident, but a sustained campaign of vitriol against a grief-stricken family".

In January 2026, the release of 3 million documents related to the Epstein files restarted the debate over Madeleine's disappearance, as her name was mentioned in an email dated from July 2019.

=== Libel actions ===
In addition to their legal efforts against Gonçalo Amaral and his publisher, the McCanns and Tapas Seven brought libel actions against several newspapers. The Daily Express, Daily Star and their sister Sunday papers, owned by Northern & Shell, published front-page apologies in 2008 and donated £550,000 to Madeleine's Fund. The Tapas Seven were awarded £375,000 against the Express group, also donated to Madeleine's Fund, along with an apology in the Daily Express. The McCanns received £55,000 from The Sunday Times in 2013 when the newspaper implied that they had withheld e-fits from the police.

Robert Murat received £600,000 in out-of-court settlements for libel in relation to 100 articles published by eleven newspapers – The Sun and News of the World (News International), Daily Express, Sunday Express and Daily Star (Northern & Shell), London Evening Standard, Daily Mail and Metro (Associated Newspapers), Daily Mirror, Sunday Mirror and Daily Record (Mirror Group Newspapers). According to The Observer, it was the largest number of separate libel actions brought in the UK by the same person in relation to one issue. His two associates were each awarded $100,000, and all three received public apologies. The British Sky Broadcasting Group, which owns Sky News, paid Murat undisclosed damages in 2008 and agreed that Sky News would host an apology on its website for twelve months.

== Netflix documentary (2019) ==
Netflix released an eight-part documentary series, The Disappearance of Madeleine McCann, on 15 March 2019. Interviewees included Jim Gamble, former head of CEOP; Alan Johnson, former British home secretary; Brian Kennedy, the British businessman who supported the McCanns financially; Justine McGuiness, the McCanns' former spokesperson; Gonçalo Amaral, former head of the PJ investigation; Robert Murat, the first arguido; Julian Peribañez, a former Método 3 private investigator; Sandra Felgueiras, a Portuguese journalist who covered the disappearance; and Anthony Summers and Robbyn Swan, authors of Looking for Madeleine (2014). The McCann family did not support the production of the documentary, refusing to take part and encouraging others not to be involved.

== See also ==
- List of people who disappeared mysteriously (2000–present)
- Reactions to the disappearance of Madeleine McCann
- Reported sightings of Madeleine McCann
- Disappearance of Suzy Lamplugh – previously Britain and the world's biggest ever missing person's inquiry

== Works cited ==
News sources are listed in the References section only.

- Bainbridge, Caroline (2012). "'They've taken her!' Psychoanalytic Perspectives on Mediating Maternity, Feeling and Loss". Studies in the Maternal. 2 (1): 1–18. doi:10.16995/sim.85. ISSN 1759-0434.
- Collins, Danny (2008). Vanished: The Truth about the Disappearance of Madeleine McCann. London: John Blake.
- Enright, Anne (4 October 2007). "Diary". London Review of Books. Vol. 29, no. 19. p. 39. Archived from the original on 1 October 2009.
- Goc, Nicola (2009). "Framing the news: 'bad' mothers and the 'Medea' news frame" (PDF). Australian Journalism Review. 21 (1): 33–47. Archived (PDF) from the original on 10 August 2017.
- Kennedy, Julia (2010). "Don't you forget about me: An exploration of the "Maddie Phenomenon" on YouTube" (PDF). Journalism Studies. 11 (2): 225–242. doi:10.1080/14616700903290635. S2CID 145731936.
- Lawton, Jerry (19 March 2012). "Transcript of testimony" (PDF). Leveson Inquiry. pp. 45–95. Archived from the original on 22 January 2014.
- Machado, Helena; Santos, Filipe (2009). "The disappearance of Madeleine McCann: Public drama and trial by media in the Portuguese press". Crime, Media, Culture. 5 (2): 146–167. doi:10.1177/1741659009335691. hdl:1822/54854. S2CID 145465416.
- Machado, Helena; Santos, Filipe (2011). "Popular press and forensic genetics in Portugal: Expectations and disappointments regarding two cases of missing children". Public Understanding of Science. 20 (3): 303–318. doi:10.1177/0963662509336710. hdl:10316/41854. PMID 21796881. S2CID 8167032.
- Machado, Helen; Prainsack, Barbara (2016) [2012]. "Setting the Scene: Portugal". Tracing Technologies: Prisoners' Views in the Era of Csi. New York and Abingdon: Routledge.
- McCann, Kate (2011). Madeleine: Our Daughter's Disappearance and the Continuing Search for Her. London: Bantam Press. ISBN 978-1-4464-3760-5.
- Rehling, Nicola (2012). "'Touching Everyone': Media Identifications, Imagined Communities and New Media Technologies in the Case of Madeleine McCann". In Parkin-Gounelas, Ruth (ed.). The Psychology and Politics of the Collective. New York and Abingdon: Routledge. pp. 152–167. ISBN 978-0-415-51026-4. Archived from the original on 9 October 2021.
- Spence, Des (2 June 2007). "Madeleine McCann". BMJ. 334 (7604): 1168. doi:10.1136/bmj.39231.432211.59. JSTOR 0507311. PMC 1885328.
- Summers, Anthony; Swan, Robbyn (2014). Looking For Madeleine. London: Headline Publishing Group.
- Synott, John; Coulias, Andria; Ioannou, Maria (June 2017). "Online trolling: The case of Madeleine McCann" (PDF). Computers in Human Behavior. 71: 70–78. doi:10.1016/j.chb.2017.01.053. Archived (PDF) from the original on 28 April 2019.
