= Reported sightings of Madeleine McCann =

Sightings of British missing person

Madeleine McCann, aged three

Madeleine McCann is a British child who went missing on the evening of Thursday, 3 May 2007, shortly before her fourth birthday, from an apartment in Praia da Luz, Portugal, while on holiday with her family.

The Portuguese police investigation into her disappearance closed in July 2008. Scotland Yard began a review of the investigation, known as Operation Grange, in May 2011 and announced in April 2012 that they believed Madeleine might still be alive. Since the disappearance, there have been many reported sightings of Madeleine in Portugal and elsewhere.

== Portugal ==
Locations
1 Tapas restaurant, Ocean Club.
2 McCann apartment, Ocean Club, 5A Rua Dr Agostinho da Silva.
3 21:15 Jane Tanner sighting, junction of Rua Dr Francisco Gentil Martins and Rua Dr Agostinho da Silva.
4 22:00 Mary and Martin Smith sighting, Rua da Escola Primária 500 yards (460 m) from the McCanns' apartment, walking away from the Ocean Club and towards Rua 25 de Abril and the beach.

=== 3 May 2007 ===
==== Tanner, 21:15 ====
The first possible sighting was around 21:15 on 3 May, 45 minutes before Madeleine's mother raised the alarm. Jane Tanner, who was travelling with the McCanns, noticed a man walking along the road on which the McCanns' holiday apartment was situated. She said he was carrying a barefoot child who was wearing light-coloured pink pyjamas with a floral pattern. Scotland Yard has since ruled this out, saying in October 2013 that a British holidaymaker who was carrying his child home at that time had been identified, was believed to be the man seen by Tanner, and was not involved in the abduction.

==== Smith, 22:00 ====
A second sighting is being taken seriously by Scotland Yard. At around 22:00, an Irish family saw a man carrying a young girl on Rua da Escola Primária. They described her as four years old, wearing light-coloured pyjamas, with blonde hair and pale skin. They said the man was in his mid-30s, 1.75–1.80 m in height, with a slim-to-normal build, short brown hair, wearing cream or beige trousers with a black leather jacket. Scotland Yard issued an efit of the man on 13 October 2013.

=== 4–17 May ===
On the evening of 4 May, Antonio Castela, a taxi driver, took three men, a woman, and a girl resembling Madeleine from Monte Gordo to the Hotel Apolo in Vila Real de Santo António, where they drove away in a blue Jeep. He said that he had recorded the sighting with the PJ but that they had not contacted him again.

A Portuguese trucker telephoned the Método 3 helpline in November reporting that he had seen a blonde woman pass a child wrapped in a blanket to a man, who then 'bundled' her into a car. He said this took place two days after the disappearance, in the Algarve town of Silves.

Police in the mountainous town of Nelas, northern central Portugal, received information of a girl matching Madeleine's description who was seen with a man in a supermarket on 8 May. The man, a Belgian citizen, stopped at the supermarket with his daughter and left the place in a car before police were contacted, but police later confirmed that the sighting had been a false alarm.

People in the resort came forward to report unusual incidents including a woman who noticed a man trying to take away a pram and a man who caught a stranger taking photographs of young blonde girls on a beach. Portuguese police also investigated a report by holidaymaker Andre van Wyk. Van Wyk claimed that, shortly after the disappearance, he had seen a girl resembling Madeleine being taken in a cart to a gypsy camp near Portimão, about ten miles (16 km) from where Madeleine disappeared.

On 9 May, the 24 Horas newspaper reported that police had found a vehicle near Praia da Luz that may have been used by the kidnapper. Further, CCTV video from a petrol station near Lagos showed a child matching Madeleine's description with a woman and two men. The child was having an altercation with the woman. The following day it was reported that the car from the petrol station had British number plates and it was claimed that the person caught taking photographs was one of the men on the CCTV footage.

An anonymous witness contacted police claiming to have spotted a Fiat Marea with a forged license plate in Pinhal Novo, Palmela, Setúbal, on May 17, which allegedly transported the missing child.

== Spain ==
Two women reported seeing a child who looked like Madeleine with a man at a petrol station near Cartagena, Spain, on 21 August 2007. This was discounted after a thorough investigation by the Spanish National Police and Civil Guard.

There was a further reported sighting, in early April 2012, on the Costa del Sol.

== Morocco ==
Marie Olli, a Norwegian woman living in the Spanish town of Fuengirola, contacted the police on 10 May 2007, claiming she had seen a girl matching Madeleine's description in a petrol station in Marrakesh, Morocco. The girl, who was said to have appeared sad, was allegedly accompanied by a man in his late 30s. At about the same time, a British tourist reported seeing Madeleine near the Marrakesh Ibis hotel. Although Interpol subsequently discounted these sightings, officers from Leicestershire police remained in Morocco for some days afterwards. A Spanish tourist saw a girl resembling Madeleine as she drove through the town of Zaio in northern Morocco at the end of May. Attention switched back to Morocco on 4 June, after GCHQ in Cheltenham picked up phone intercept messages in Arabic referring to "the little blonde girl", a German man, and a ferry from Tarifa in Spain.

Another Spanish tourist, Isabel Gonzalez, has said that she saw a girl fitting Madeleine's description being dragged across a street, also in Zaio, by a North African woman on 15 June. Naoual Malhi, a Spanish woman of Moroccan origin, claimed to have spotted the girl with a woman in the village of Fnideq, on 21 August, but private investigators were unable to substantiate the lead. A photograph of a blonde girl being carried on the back of a North African woman was taken on 31 August by Clara Torres, another Spanish tourist, in Zinat in northern Morocco, but it turned out to be a Moroccan girl. A school inspector claimed to have seen the child in Karia Ba Mohamed around the start of October, but after enquiries, the local police were adamant that she was not there. Additionally, the Moroccan Interior Minister Chakib Benmoussa said on 4 November that there was no evidence to suggest that Madeleine was in Morocco.

== Elsewhere ==
There were two reported sightings in Belgium. The first was during May 2007 in Liège and the second occurred on 28 July on a café terrace in Tongeren. In the latter case, children's therapist Katleen Sampermans said that Madeleine was in the company of a Dutch man and an English woman. However, the girl turned out to be the four-year-old daughter of a Belgian man.

Security was tightened in Valletta, Malta, on 21 June 2007 following five reported sightings on the island. The total sightings had risen to 29 by 27 June.

In New Zealand, CCTV video from a department store in southern Dunedin showed a girl who looked like Madeleine being led into the store by a man at around 9:00 pm on 5 December 2007, seven months after her disappearance.

Dutch student Melissa Fiering claimed that she saw Madeleine with a 'tall, swarthy man', at the L'Arche motorway service station restaurant in the south of France, on 15 February 2008. However, the French police, after examining CCTV evidence, determined that the sighting was not of the missing child.

The first reported sighting in Britain occurred in Dorset in February 2008. Retired civil servant Alan Cameron said that she was with a Portuguese couple who came to the door.

A sighting of Madeleine McCann was reported in the Sydney central business district on 17 March 2008. The reported sighting, of a middle-aged man carrying a blonde girl, turned out to be a false alarm.

There have been six reported sightings in Brazil. A witness reported seeing Madeleine on a plane flying to São Paulo, in late March 2008. Five earlier reports had been investigated and discounted.

The release of the Portuguese police case files in August 2008 revealed a possible sighting in Amsterdam, Netherlands, in early May 2007. Anna Stam reported to Dutch police that a girl of three or four years of age, who resembled Madeleine, had come into her shop and had told her that the adult she was with was "a stranger" who "took me from my mummy" while she was on holiday. She added that her name was "Maddy". The McCanns' spokesman Clarence Mitchell said that it was a "disgrace" that they had not been told by police about the reported sighting at the time. The files included a 14-volume annexe of reported sightings, of Madeleine, across the world.

The Swedish newspaper Aftonbladet published, in October 2009, a photograph of a girl, seen in Sweden, who bore a great similarity to Madeleine. The photographer claimed that the girl only spoke English, and was accompanied by a man who spoke Swedish.

A sighting in Leh, India, was reported on 28 July 2011. British and American tourists reportedly saw a young girl with a French/Belgian couple, who claimed that the child was theirs. The chief of police in Leh, Vivek Gupta, denied the reports and stated that no DNA test had been undertaken by the police.

New Zealand police were informed of a possible sighting in Queenstown, on 31 December 2012. The informant said that the girl she had seen had the same coloboma of the iris as Madeleine. After investigation, police identified the girl and stated that they were "absolutely satisfied" that the girl was not Madeleine.

== Disclosure of official information ==
Leicestershire Police agreed, in the High Court on 7 July 2008, to disclose the content of files related to sightings and tip-offs. They handed over 81 pieces of information to Madeleine's parents.

== See also ==
- Reactions to the disappearance of Madeleine McCann
