= Murder of Ylenia Lenhard =

2007 abduction and murder of a child in Switzerland

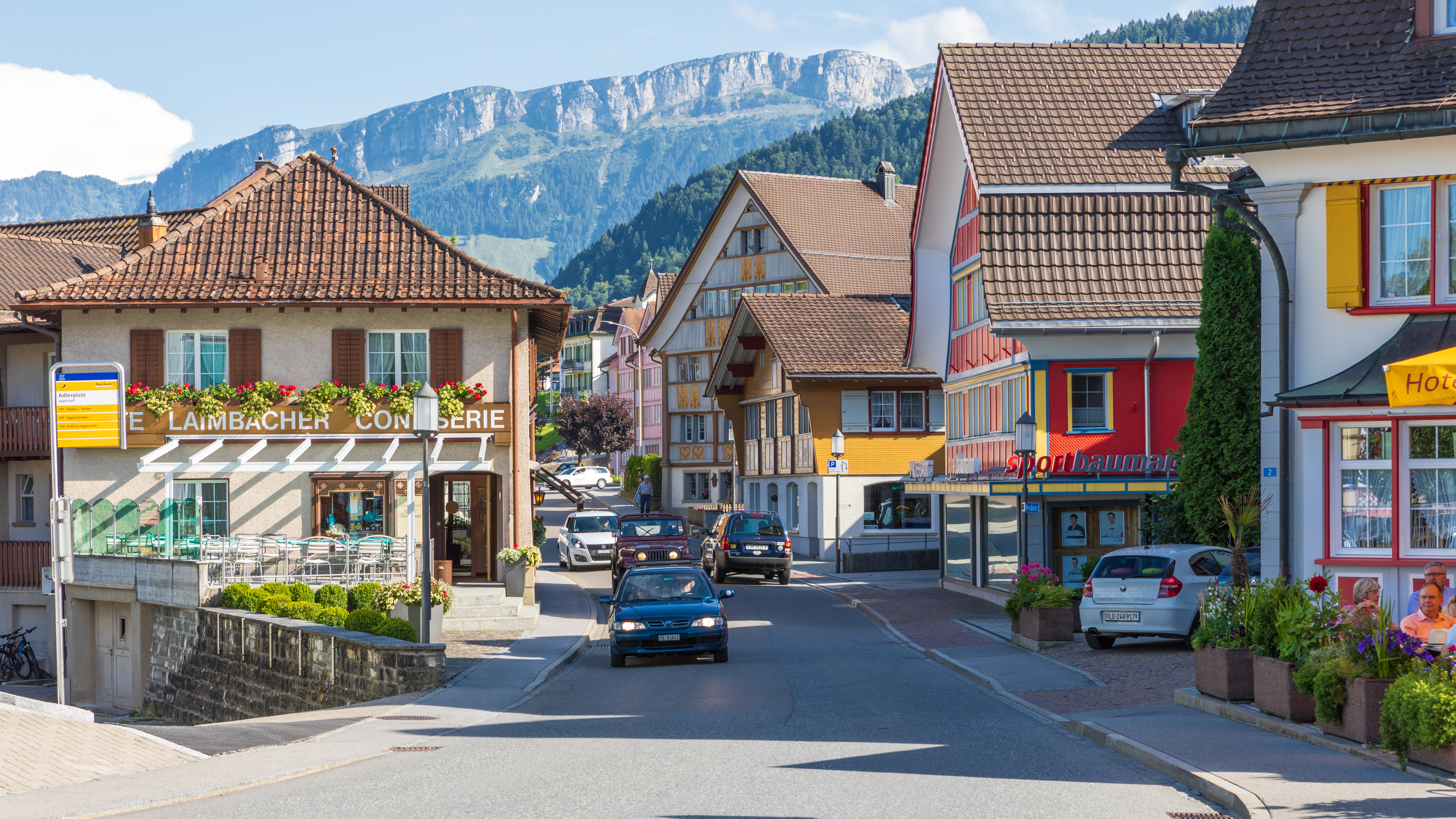
- Appenzell, Switzerland, Lenhard's hometown
- Date: 31 July 2007
- Location: Appenzell, Switzerland (abduction) Oberbüren, Switzerland (murder)
- Deaths: 2 (victim and suspect)
- Injuries: 1 (potential witness)
- Suspects: Urs Hans von Aesch

Ylenia Lenhard (18 November 2001 – 31 July 2007) was a five-year-old girl from Appenzell, Switzerland who was abducted while riding her bike to the local pool on 31 July 2007. Her body was found more than a month later in Bürerwald, a wooded area outside of Oberbüren, approximately 30 kilometres (19 mi) away from Appenzell. The suspect was identified by DNA as Urs Hans von Aesch (11 November 1940 – 31 July 2007), a Swiss man living in Benimantell, Spain. He was found dead from suicide by firearm the day after the abduction. No prior connection was found between the Lenhard family and von Aesch.

The case was followed closely by the public, who reported more than 1,400 tips, many of them false or misleading. The local newspaper Blick was criticised in particular for its coverage of the case, which involved a number of published retractions and corrections from the St. Gallen police. Blick speculated that the case was linked to the disappearance of Madeleine McCann (3 May 2007) due to the proximity in timing, the girls' similar appearances, and reports of a van matching that of von Aesch's in Algarve near Praia da Luz around McCann's disappearance, though no legitimate connection has been made.

== Background ==
=== Ylenia Lenhard ===
Ylenia Gabriela Alisha Gioia Nikita Lenhard was born on 18 November 2001 to Charlotte Lenhard. She was named after the daughter of singers Al Bano and Romina Power, who disappeared in 1994 and has not been found. Ylenia's mother, a nurse, met midwife Gabriela Allenspach, another unmarried woman who wanted to start a family. They decided to move in and raise their children together. Allenspach's two children were born about two and three years before Ylenia. The two women separated following Ylenia's death but Charlotte maintained custody of the children after Allenspach was placed in a psychiatric hospital in 2010. Allenspach died by suicide in 2014.

=== Urs Hans von Aesch ===
Urs Hans von Aesch completed a pen-making apprenticeship in 1959 and subsequently started a business selling pens using loans from his family. He began to neglect his business and, in an attempt to bring in money, von Aesch sent an anonymous ransom note to a Swiss coal tycoon threatening to kidnap his son. The businessman hired a private investigator and involved the police, and von Aesch was brought in front of the Zurich High Court in 1961 and sentenced to 15 months in jail. The court psychiatrist concluded that he was a "poorly developed, infantile psychopath." Von Aesch moved to Iselisberg in Thurgau, Switzerland with his wife around 1976. The couple cared for two girls in the 1980s but had no children of their own. They moved to the Spanish town Benimantell in 1990. In the weeks leading up to the abduction, von Aesch traveled back to Switzerland by bus, reportedly looking to rent or buy a flat or house.

== Disappearance ==
On 31 July 2007, five-year-old Ylenia Lenhard left home on her bike to pick up shampoo she had forgotten at the public pool the day before. She was last seen leaving the indoor pool. Her mother reported her missing at 11:57am. Around 1:00pm, an unnamed man who had been napping in the Bürerwald forest near Oberbüren was reportedly approached and shot in the chest with a pistol without warning. The man was able to get away and a passing motorist took him to the hospital. The shooter, Urs Hans von Aesch, killed himself by shooting himself in the head with a handgun after leaving the pistol along the road. Von Aesch's abandoned Renault Trafic panel van was found later that evening about 30 kilometres (19 mi) away from Appenzell with Lenhard's Brother Bear backpack, which contained her clothes, and her helmet found nearby. Her Razor scooter was then found in the forest and von Aesch's body was found the next morning.

St. Gallen police received more than 1,400 tips, many of them based on speculation and ultimately false. They did, however, learn that a white van like von Aesch's was seen outside the public pool prior to Lenhard's disappearance. By 6 August, the police had verified the DNA of both Lenhard and von Aesch's fingerprints on Lenhard's belongings and inside the van. The search for Lenhard included at least 50 St. Gallen police officers, 30 local firefighters, dog handlers, divers, and an army helicopter, in addition to citizens.

Police offered a CHF 21,500 (or €13,000) reward, financed by private funds, for information leading to Lenhard's location. Her body was eventually found in Bürerwald on 17 September, six weeks after her abduction, by Simon Kuhn, a local computer scientist. She was identified by her jewelry. The forest had been searched several times in the preceding weeks, but nothing was found. Her body had been dug up by wild animals from the 1 foot (30 cm) by 2 feet (61 cm) hole she was buried in. While police initially suspected she was the victim of a rape-murder, they later confirmed that there was no evidence of rape and that her body showed no signs of physical harm. The exact circumstances leading to her death were unclear due to the body's decomposition but her cause of death was ultimately ruled as toluol poisoning.

== Aftermath ==
Swiss citizens demanded the introduction of an alert that could be issued immediately after a child is reported missing. The open letter collected 100 signatures, including from Stéphane Lambiel, Pirmin Zurbriggen, and Ernesto Bertarelli. This system was not put into place until 2010 following the 2009 murder of Lucie Trezzini, a 16-year-old au pair. Announcements of abductions are now broadcast on trains, in public transport stations, on motorway display boards, and by text. A sex offender database was also established by the intercantonal police organisation Soko Rebecca. In October 2007, Lenhard's mother founded the Ylenia Foundation, which in its first ten years had raised money for projects in the Philippines to aid disadvantaged families. This included rebuilding damaged schools and providing necessary school supplies.

Blick, a local newspaper, was accused of "deliberately misinforming the public" by the St. Gallen public prosecutor's office after the publication had to issue several retractions and corrections. Lenhard's family also criticised them for publishing speculation rather than fact, which had given them false hope that additional leads had been found. For years after the case was closed, media, including Blick, speculated that von Aesch had an accomplice, as many believed he would not have been able to carry out the abduction and murder on his own. St. Gallen police refused to reopen the case since no DNA from a third person was found on the van, gun, or any of Lenhard's items, and no credible leads had been reported.

== Suspected connections to other murders ==
Circumstantial evidence created suspicion that von Aesch may have been tied to 10 missing children during his 14 years living in Iselisberg, particularly as the abductions reportedly stopped after he and his wife moved to Spain. He was not charged in any of these disappearances.

Blick published speculation about whether von Aesch was involved in the disappearance of Madeleine McCann, alleging that he had stayed in Algarve near Praia da Luz, where the family was staying, around the time of her disappearance. A white van with Spanish number plates matching the description of von Aesch's was reportedly parked for several days in front of the McCanns' apartment and was not seen again after McCann disappeared. As they had before, the St. Gallen police dismissed Blick's claims, which had made it into English-language news and was being attributed to their office. They said that active investigations by their office about von Aesch in Portugal was "in no way true and [was] completely wrong." In 2013, Scotland Yard officers travelled to St. Gallen to investigate possible links between the two crimes and were told by local police that no connection had been made between the two cases.

== See also ==
- List of solved missing person cases (2000s)
