= Suspect =

Person accused or suspected of committing a crime

In law enforcement jargon, a suspect is a known person accused or suspected of committing a crime. By definition, a suspect is distinct from the perpetrator of the offense (perp, in dated U.S. slang), though in the United States, the word suspect is often used as a jargon when referring to the perpetrator. The term is also related to the terms defendant, the accused, person of interest, and prime suspect.

== Terminology ==
In law enforcement jargon, a suspect is a known person accused or suspected of committing a crime. Police and reporters in the United States often use the word suspect as a jargon when referring to the perpetrator of the offense (perp, in dated U.S. slang). However, in official definition, the perpetrator is the robber, assailant, counterfeiter, etc.—the person who committed the crime. The distinction between suspect and perpetrator recognizes that the suspect is not known to have committed the offense, while the perpetrator—who may not yet have been suspected of the crime, and is thus not necessarily a suspect—is the one who did. The suspect may be a different person from the perpetrator, or there may have been no actual crime, which would mean there is no perpetrator.

A common error in police reports is a witness description of the suspect (as a witness generally describes a perpetrator, while a mug shot is of a suspect). Frequently, it is stated that police are looking for the suspect, when there is no suspect; the police could be looking for a suspect, but they should ultimately be looking for the perpetrator, and very often it is impossible to tell from such a police report whether there is a suspect or not.

Under the judicial systems of the U.S., once a decision is approved to arrest a suspect, or bind them over for trial, either by a prosecutor issuing an information, a grand jury issuing a true bill or indictment, or a judge issuing an arrest warrant, the suspect can then be properly called a defendant, or the accused.

=== Person of interest ===
To avoid clearly labeling someone as a suspect or perpetrator, police in the late 20th and early 21st century began to sometimes use the terms person of interest, possible suspect, or even possible person of interest. The term person of interest has no clear legal meaning.

=== Prime suspect ===
A prime suspect or key suspect is a person who is considered by the law enforcement agency investigating a crime to be the most likely suspect. The idiom prime suspect is believed to have originated in 1931. Key suspect is seen as early as 1948.

==== Reasons ====
There are various reasons a person may be considered a prime suspect. These include:

- Being positively identified as the only person seen at or near the scene of the crime around the time the crime occurred
- Being linked by some form of forensic evidence, such as DNA
- Being named by witness(es)
- Having the most likely motive to commit the crime
- Racial profiling
- Having knowledge that only one who committed the crime would have
- Having a history of committing crimes with some resemblance to the crime being investigated
- Having confessed to the act

== See also ==
- Arguido
- Criminal
