= Reactions to the disappearance of Madeleine McCann =

Appeal at the 2007 FA Cup Final

On the evening of Thursday, 3 May 2007, shortly before her fourth birthday, a British child, Madeleine McCann, went missing from a holiday apartment in Praia da Luz in the Algarve in Portugal, in which she was staying with her parents.

The Portuguese police investigation into her disappearance closed in July 2008. Scotland Yard in May 2011 began a review of the case, Operation Grange, and in April 2012 announced their belief that Madeleine might still be alive.

In the weeks following her disappearance, Madeleine's parents implemented a successful publicity campaign that kept her in the public eye. This resulted in a wide-reaching international response, both in the media and by the public, which led to some criticism that the media attention was excessive. There was also comment that the UK media had unfairly criticised the Portuguese police.

== Publicity ==
=== By the family ===
An official website for the search was set up, and the McCann family broadcast two early video appeals. The first was a photograph and video montage set to Simple Minds' song "Don't You (Forget About Me)" and included an animation of the word LOOK in uppercase with a reproduction of her coloboma as a radial line inside the first letter O, which blinks. The second featured a montage of images with a voice-over by actress Zoë Wanamaker mentioning her coloboma, seeking information about her whereabouts, and asking people to download and display a poster of her from the official site.

The family said that part of the money raised from Madeleine's Fund would go towards hiring professional campaigners, with a view to achieving the same saturation level of publicity across Europe as had been attained in the UK and the Algarve. The family based themselves in the same holiday resort from the time of the disappearance and stated then that they would not leave until Madeleine was located. Though as the campaign progressed, they ended up visiting the Vatican City, Spain, Germany, and Morocco for it, and on 5 June, they made an appeal on the British TV programme Crimewatch. However, shortly after being named as arguidos, the McCanns returned to the UK on 9 September.

Madeleine's father had already made a brief trip to the UK, on 20 May 2007, to help finalise the campaign for the search for his daughter. Gerry McCann visited the United States between 22 and 25 July when he met US Attorney General Alberto Gonzales and experts from the National and International Centres for Missing and Exploited Children. During interviews on network television programmes Gerry was forced to defend leaving the children alone.

The family announced on 15 September 2007 that, beginning in a fortnight, they would be spending up to £80,000, from Madeleine's Fund, on a new publicity drive, involving newspaper, television, and poster advertising to further publicise Madeleine's disappearance. This will include posters in rural parts of Portugal and Spain and television advertisements, in Arabic, in Morocco. In late October the McCanns set up a hotline + 34 902 300213, operated by private detectives, for people in the Iberian Peninsula and North Africa to phone with information.

Over Christmas 2007, the family made a television appeal. This had produced, by 27 December, 347 phone calls with information, with more subsequently. A further video appeal was made by the parents at Christmas 2008. This included footage of Madeleine taken in December 2006.

The parents launched a fresh appeal for information in March 2009, tightly focused on the area where Madeleine went missing. 10,000 leaflets in Portuguese were distributed in Praia da Luz, Lagos, and Burgau together with billboard advertising. However, many posters were promptly torn down with Correio da Manhã reporting that the local people wanted closure. On 1 May 2009, the McCanns released an age progression image of how Madeleine might appear at age six.

=== By others ===
Advertisement on the front page of Microsoft's UK website

Several unofficial webpages were created following the disappearance, notably on social networking sites such as Facebook and MySpace, offering support to the McCanns. An unofficial one minute's silence was held for Madeleine on 21 May 2007, but since it was organised by an anonymous viral email, it was not thought to be widely observed.

Robert Murat, a suspect in the investigation, has tried to generate his own publicity by selling his story. However, publicist Max Clifford indicated that he would only represent Murat if he was cleared of suspicion of kidnapping. Within the virtual world Second Life, a virtual Madeleine's Garden has been created. In early July, Bryan Adams dedicated his concert on Malta to Madeleine.

J. K. Rowling arranged with her publishers for a poster bearing the face of the missing child to be made available to booksellers when the final Harry Potter book, Harry Potter and the Deathly Hallows, was published on 21 July. Rowling said that she hoped that the posters would be displayed prominently in shops all over the world.

== Political reaction ==
The Portuguese Ambassador in London, António Santana Carlos said on 8 May 2007 that the case was of "great concern" to Portugal and asked people to trust the police, amidst growing criticism of their handling of the case. President Aníbal Cavaco Silva announced on 9 May that he was following the case "with great concern", adding that the police were "doing everything to find the child alive."

On 9 May, Tony Blair's spokesperson said that the then Prime Minister was following the case closely and that "we are helping in whatever way we can". On 16 May, coinciding with the launch of the fighting fund, the then Chancellor of the Exchequer Gordon Brown delivered a similar message to relatives of Madeleine. The then Deputy Prime Minister John Prescott also commented on the case, saying at Prime Minister's Question Time "I'm sure that the thoughts of the whole House will be with them at this terrible time."

On 26 May, a spokesman for the McCann family confirmed that Gordon Brown had telephoned the McCanns. Although the spokesman stated that the details of the conversations would remain private, he did confirm that "During them, Mr Brown offered both Gerry and Kate his full support in their efforts to find Madeleine." In late September Foreign Secretary David Miliband telephoned Gerry.

The German Justice Minister, Brigitte Zypries, said at a meeting of G8 justice ministers in Munich on 3 June, that it should be assumed that Madeleine had been abducted by a gang that passes on children to be abused. But the Portuguese prime minister, José Sócrates, praised investigators in September 2007, following criticism in the British media of the police handling of the case. Sócrates said that he had total confidence in the work carried out by the Portuguese police.

== Theories by experts ==
The disappearance provoked differing analyses by experts. Shortly after Madeleine went missing two former Scotland Yard commanders expressed the view that she had been abducted. Roy Ramm considered that it was a carefully planned kidnapping by someone who had been watching the child. John O'Connor was of the view that Madeleine had wandered out of the apartment on her own and was subsequently abducted. O'Connor opined that she was likely to be nearby and recommended a thorough search of surrounding occupied premises. This hypothesis was also supported by criminologist Mark Williams-Thomas who said, in May 2008, that he believed what happened was that Madeleine woke up, walked around the apartment, found the back patio door was insecure and wandered out. It was at this point that she was most likely abducted by an opportunistic predatory paedophile.

However Paulo Sargento, a criminal psychologist at Lusófona University in Lisbon, had produced in October 2007 a 3D reconstruction of events at the Ocean Club on the evening Madeleine disappeared, and his view was that kidnapping would be inconsistent with the evidence. The case was also reviewed by the notable forensic investigator Professor David Barclay of Robert Gordon University. His opinion was that the police were right to consider the McCanns as suspects and that the child is probably dead.

== Comparison and possible relations with the murder of Joana Cipriano ==
Joana Cipriano, an eight-year-old Portuguese girl, disappeared on 12 September 2004 from the village of Figueira, only seven miles from Praia da Luz, where Madeleine McCann disappeared on 3 May 2007. In both cases, the mothers launched campaigns to find their daughters and, in both cases, the local Polícia Judiciária investigated the possibility that the mothers had killed their daughters.

A child protection specialist, Mark Williams-Thomas, who believes that Joana's and Madeleine's disappearances are related, said that the disappearance of two children unknown to each other, within a period of four years in a seven-mile radius, would be a huge coincidence, especially considering that Portugal is a small country with few abductions. Before Joana's disappearance, the previous first-degree murder of a child in the Algarve region was in November 1990 and involved a British girl, nine-year-old Rachel Charles, who was abducted and murdered in Albufeira. Her body was found three days later; a British mechanic, Michael Cook, a friend of the family, was arrested and convicted. Leandro Silva, the common-law husband of Leonor Cipriano, said in 2007 that "the only difference between the McCanns and us is that we don't have money."

Several similarities between the cases — both girls vanished without trace within 7 miles (11 km) and less than three years of each other, in both cases officers failed to secure the crime scene, both mothers mounted campaigns to find their daughters and both women were accused of involvement—prompted Joana's family to appeal in 2008 for police to investigate whether there was a link between the disappearances.

== Fundraising ==
=== Madeleine's Fund ===
A fundraising company, known as Madeleine's Fund: Leaving No Stone Unturned, was launched in Leicester on 16 May 2007. The Fund is a limited company, not a registered charity, because its objectives are not wide enough to satisfy Charity Commission criteria for UK charities. The objectives include helping the extended family with their expenses (to prevent abuse, payments can only be authorised by the independent members of the board who are not family members) and continuing the investigation independently should that prove necessary. Any excess funds would be used to help search for other abducted children. The Fund's website reportedly received 58 million hits and 16,000 messages of support by 18 May, only two days after its launch. Over £1,095,000 had been raised by 30 October 2007. Two £2,000 monthly re-payments on the McCanns' mortgage were made from the Fund in July and August.

=== Legal costs funding ===
The trustees of Madeleine's Fund announced in September that the fund would not be used to pay the McCanns' legal costs. Initially, the McCanns considered setting up a separate appeal fund for legal expenses. However, Richard Branson created a fund for the McCann's legal expenses, including those of their current advisor, Michael Caplan QC, a solicitor and partner in the London firm of Kingsley Napley. Stephen Winyard came out in December as having contributed £100,000 to the McCanns' defence fund, which paid for DNA tests carried out on the Renault Scénic hire car used by the McCanns. He also revealed Brian Kennedy as another donor.

== Potential frauds ==
Many unofficial websites were registered which had domain names that contained slight misspellings of Madeleine's name (a practice known as typosquatting), plus keywords likely to be used in searches. These websites contained material unrelated to Madeleine.

There have also been people collecting money on the false premise that they were representing Madeleine's Fund, one of whom, Debbie Clifton, was jailed for 90 days.

On 28 June 2007, police arrested an Italian man and a Portuguese woman at a villa in Sotogrande, Cádiz over allegations that they had tried to defraud the McCanns by claiming a reward for information about their daughter. However, police said that there was no direct link with Madeleine's kidnap. On 6 July the same year, police in the Netherlands arrested a man who allegedly demanded two million euros from the McCanns for information about their missing daughter.

British barrister Michael Shrimpton presented himself as the "unofficial representative" for parents Kate and Gerry McCann, and claimed responsibility for setting up a meeting between them and Pope Benedict XVI. According to Shrimpton, Madeleine was being held in or near Morocco after being smuggled there on a drug-running vessel. Authorities rejected these claims as false and issued a strict warning to Shrimpton not to interfere with the case. Shrimpton was later charged, convicted, and imprisoned for an unrelated hoax.

== Libel actions ==
The McCanns announced on 31 August that they were suing the Portuguese tabloid Tal & Qual for libel. The newspaper reported that the "police believe" that the McCanns killed Madeleine, suggesting she may have died in an accident or from a drugs overdose. The McCanns' lawyer, Carlos Pinto de Abreu, said the couple's image had been "dragged through the dirt" by "character-assassinating, tabloid-style" news reports, adding that the press "has engaged in a horrific exercise in scandal-mongering, replete with rumours and lurid commentaries...to sell more TV time and newspaper space to advertisers". The police stressed that the McCanns were not suspects.

Tal & Qual stood by the story. The paper ceased publication after 28 September 2007, because of a drop in circulation.

The ASFIC's (Associação Sindical dos Funcionários de Investigação Criminal da Polícia Judiciária) General Secretary, Carlos Garcia, declared on 10 August 2007 that the union representing the PJ intended to take legal action against those British journalists who had accused Portuguese police officers of forging evidence. He stated that, at the beginning of the investigation, a joint working group had been created with the British police, and that they had been working in close cooperation. Thus when the Portuguese police is criticised, so too is the British police. He claimed that the number of abductions resulting in murder was a decisive factor that determined the different methods of investigation adopted by the two forces.

In March 2008, the McCanns launched a libel suit against the Daily Express and its sister newspaper, the Daily Star, as well as their Sunday equivalents, following the newspapers' coverage of the case. The action concerned more than 100 stories across the four newspapers, which accused the McCanns of causing Madeleine's death and then covering it up. One immediate consequence of the action was that Express Newspapers pulled all references to Madeleine from its websites. In a settlement reached at the High Court of Justice, the newspapers agreed to run a front-page apology to the McCanns on 19 March 2008, publish another apology on the front pages of the Sunday editions of 23 March and make a statement of apology at the High Court. Guardian media commentator Roy Greenslade said it was "unprecedented" for four major newspapers to offer front-page apologies, but also said that it was more than warranted given that the papers had committed "a substantial libel" that shamed the entire British press.

In its apology, the Express stated that "a number of articles in the newspaper have suggested that the couple caused the death of their missing daughter Madeleine and then covered it up. We acknowledge that there is no evidence whatsoever to support this theory and that Kate and Gerry are completely innocent of any involvement in their daughter's disappearance." The McCanns also accepted £550,000 ($1.1 million) damages and costs. They promised to pay the damages into Madeleine's Fund.

Robert Murat instigated defamation proceedings against Sky News and 11 British newspapers, in April 2008. He used London solicitors Simons Muirhead & Burton on a conditional fee agreement. The first paper to settle was The Scotsman who published an apology on 15 May but paid no damages. The newspaper groups Associated Newspapers, Express Newspapers, MGN Limited and News Group Newspapers settled with Murat, on 17 July, for a £600,000 payout. They also issued a public apology in the High Court. BSkyB also paid him damages in a separate libel case. Sergey Malinka, and Murat's girlfriend, Michaela Walczuch, accepted more than £100,000 each.

The friends of the McCanns, known as the Tapas Seven, were awarded around £375,000 in damages and secured printed apologies from Express Newspapers. The friends donated the settlement monies to the Fund. The apologies, printed in both the Daily Express and Daily Star, said "In articles ... we suggested that the holiday companions of Kate and Gerry McCann might have covered up the true facts concerning Madeleine McCann's disappearance and/or misled the authorities investigating her disappearance. We also reported speculation that ... Dr Russell O'Brien, was suspected of involvement with Madeleine's abduction. We now accept that these suggestions should never have been made and were completely untrue. ..."

The McCanns applied for an injunction, on 8 December 2009, prohibiting the sale of the book, written by Gonçalo Amaral, Maddie, a Verdade da Mentira (Maddie, the Truth of the Lie), and launched a libel suit against Amaral.

== Books ==
- Maddie 129, ISBN 978-989-8028-61-7, that covers the 129 days between Madeleine's disappearance and the McCanns' return to Rothley. The book claims to identify contradictions and unanswered questions in the accounts of the McCanns and their friends. It was published in early November 2007, in English by Prime Books, and written by two Portuguese journalists Hernâni Carvalho and Luís Maia.
- A Culpa dos McCann (The Guilt of the McCanns), ISBN 989-8014-81-4, was published in Portugal in December 2007. Written by Portuguese daily newspaper Correio da Manhã editor-in-chief Manuel Catarino, it was published by Guerra & Paz.
- Madeleine: A Heartbreaking and Extraordinary Disappearance, ISBN 978-0-85079-348-2, was published in December 2007 by Express Newspapers and written by Robert Downing.
- A Estrela de Madeleine (The Star of Madeleine), ISBN 978-972-23-3890-5, written by Paulo Pereira Cristóvão, was published by Editorial Presença.
- O Enigma da Praia da Luz (The Enigma of Praia da Luz), ISBN 978-989-8014-91-7, was written by Francisco Duarte de Carvalho and was published by Editora Guerra & Paz.
- Maddie, a Verdade da Mentira (Maddie, the Truth of the Lie), ISBN 978-989-8174-12-3, written by Gonçalo Amaral, who had originally headed the police investigation, was published by Guerra & Paz on 24 July 2008. In the book, Amaral detailed his belief that Madeleine died in the family's holiday apartment.
- What really happened to Madeleine McCann? subtitled '60 reasons which suggest that she was not abducted', ISBN 978-0-9507954-7-8, was written by Tony Bennett and was published on 31 October 2008 by The Madeleine Foundation.
- Madeleine, ISBN 978-0-593-06791-8, was written by Kate McCann and was published by Bantam Press on 12 May 2011.

== Film and television ==
=== BBC Panorama ===
An episode of the BBC current affairs programme Panorama, 'The Mystery of Madeleine McCann', was broadcast on 19 November 2007, and attracted 5.3 million viewers. The programme reviewed the evidence that was currently publicly available but did not come to a conclusion on what happened to Madeleine. The original producer of the programme walked out, claiming that criticism of the media and the Portuguese police had been toned down for the broadcast version.

=== Proposed documentaries ===
The McCanns have given permission for talks to open about the possibility of the disappearance being made into a documentary. Spokesman Clarence Mitchell confirmed that a meeting, with talent agency and production company IMG to discuss a possible film, was held in December 2007, but the proposal was abandoned.

Mitchell also confirmed, in March 2008, that discussions were taking place with ITV and other companies over the possibility of the McCanns appearing in a documentary, which would focus on missing children in general and the different initiatives used to help look for them. The programme, Madeleine, One Year On: Campaign For Change, was broadcast on ITV1 on 30 April 2008. The programme's producers said the McCanns had no editorial control and were not paid, although £10,000 was donated to the Find Madeleine Fund.

=== TVI documentary ===
A television documentary, Maddie, a Verdade da Mentira (Maddie, the Truth of the Lie), based on the book of the same name by Gonçalo Amaral, was produced by TVI. It was broadcast on 13 April 2009. The documentary pulled in an audience of over 2 million.

== Implications for television programmes and films ==
ITV announced on 9 May 2007 that it would be rewriting a planned child kidnap plot, despite having already filmed some scenes, from their popular soap Coronation Street. Similarly, on 23 May, the BBC also announced that it was scrapping a storyline from rival soap EastEnders, that had already been filmed, which also was to feature the kidnapping of a child. In both cases, these plot lines were removed or altered due to the parallel with the Madeleine case, and because the channels did not want to cause further distress to the McCann family.

ITV was criticised in September 2007 over the showing of Torn, a three-part original drama series. The plot involved the disappearance of a four-year-old girl and the family's search for her. ITV responded to the criticism by stating that Torn had been written two years earlier and filmed two months before Madeleine disappeared. Also in September 2007, actor and director Ben Affleck postponed the UK release of his film Gone Baby Gone, which had been scheduled for release on 28 December, to 18 April 2008. Its plot centres on the abduction of a four-year-old girl who is left at home alone by her mother. The actress who plays the girl in the film, Madeline O'Brien, reportedly resembles Madeleine. According to Affleck, the release of the film in the UK was delayed because those involved with the film didn't want to "touch a nerve or inflame anybody's sensitivities."

== Tributes ==
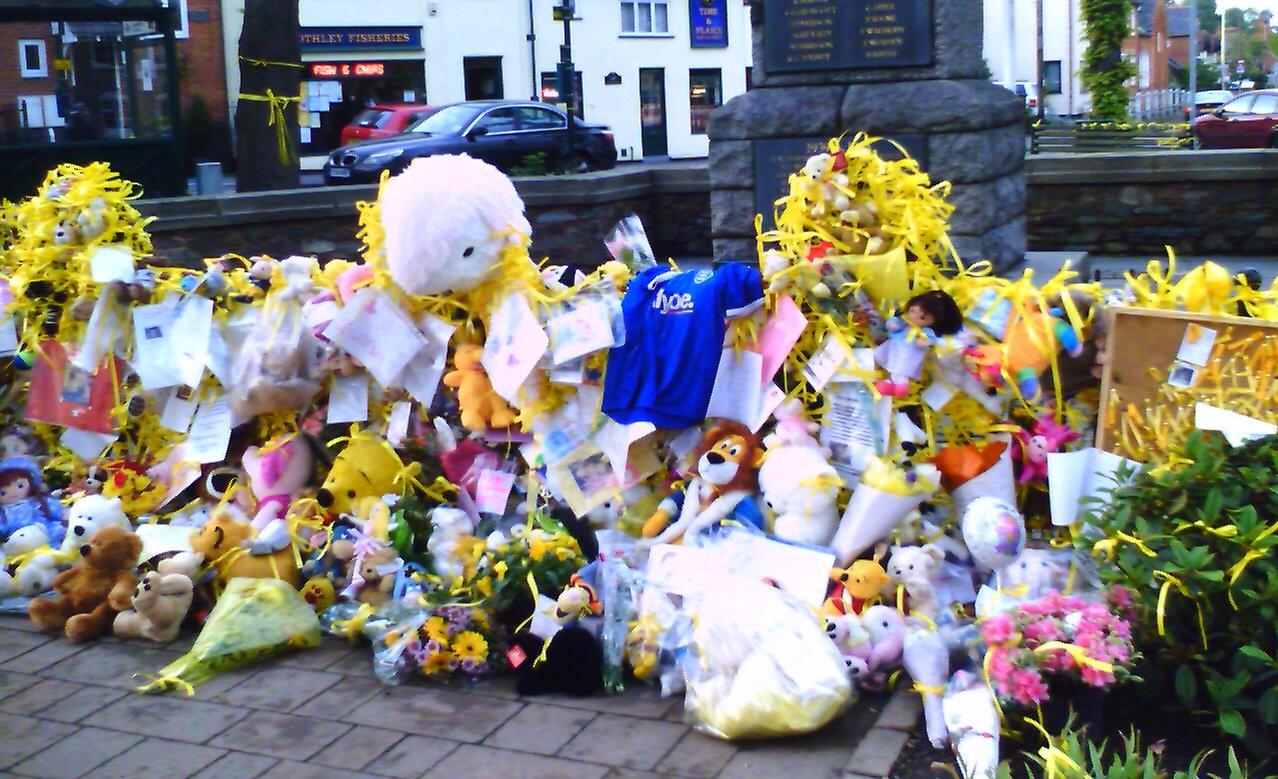
Tributes in Rothley on 17 May 2007

Church services were held in Portugal and the UK on 3 May 2008, to mark the first anniversary of Madeleine's disappearance.

== Appeals ==
There were many appeals for Madeleine's safe return, including from her family, celebrities, church leaders, and the police.

=== From the family ===
Her father, Gerry McCann, said, "Words cannot describe the anguish and despair that we are feeling. Please, if you have Madeleine, let her come home to her Mummy, Daddy, brother and sister." He went on to say that the family would leave "no stone unturned" in the search for Madeleine and that he and his wife "remained positive."

Madeleine's aunt, Philomena McCann, drew up a poster to circulate in a chain email to help find the child. She also commented during a live phone interview that there was little coverage of the case in other countries apart from the UK and Portugal.

=== From the police ===
On 21 May 2007, the British Child Exploitation and Online Protection Centre (CEOP) reported that British police are calling on visitors to the Ocean Club Resort, Praia da Luz, or the surrounding areas in the two weeks leading up to Madeleine's disappearance on Thursday 3 May to provide copies of any relevant photographs taken during their stay, in an attempt to identify an abductor using a biometric facial recognition application, through which the features of bystanders in those photographs could be compared to those of international sex offenders and other criminals. By 1 June, over one thousand photographs had been uploaded.

=== From religious leaders ===
On 11 May 2007 Roman Catholic Archbishop Mario Conti of Glasgow said that his prayers would continue for the safe return of Madeleine Then on 30 May, Pope Benedict XVI, at an audience in the Vatican with the McCanns, promised to pray for the girl's safe return.

=== From sport ===
==== From football ====
Manchester United footballer Cristiano Ronaldo, who is Portuguese, made a televised appeal on MUTV for her safe return saying "I was very upset to hear of the abduction of Madeleine McCann and I appeal to anyone with information to come forward - please come forward." Chelsea and England footballer John Terry and his Portuguese teammate Paulo Ferreira said that they were "devastated to hear that young Maddy was abducted. Our thoughts and feelings go out to her parents, her family and we are urging anyone out there with any information at all, please, please, please come forward." On 11 May 2007, David Beckham also made a public appeal. "If you have seen this little girl please could you go to your local authorities or police and give any information that you have," said Beckham, holding up a poster with a photograph of Madeleine.

After a picture was released of Madeleine in an Everton shirt, Everton's Portuguese footballers Nuno Valente and Manuel Fernandes appealed for any news on her whereabouts and Phil Neville issued the following statement on behalf of the club. "Everton has fans all over the world and I know that they, along with everyone connected with the football club, are hoping and praying for Madeleine's safe return. Our thoughts are very much with the family at this extremely distressing time." Manager David Moyes added "Everybody here is desperately wanting to hear good news and my thoughts and prayers are with the family. If anybody out there knows anything, please come forward". Celtic footballer Neil Lennon made an appeal for Madeleine's safety, and yellow armbands were worn on 12 May 2007 against Aberdeen to mark her fourth birthday.

A video appealing for help with the search for Madeleine was broadcast to Spanish football fans visiting the city of Glasgow for the 2007 UEFA Cup Final on 16 May. Another film was aired at half-time during the English FA Cup Final on 19 May. Before their departure for the 2007 UEFA Champions League Final on Monday 21 May, Liverpool's squad were photographed with a banner appealing for any information on Madeleine's whereabouts.

==== From cricket ====
The England cricket team wore yellow ribbons during the Lords' Test match against the West Indies, in May 2007, to show their support for Madeleine. A picture of Madeleine was also shown on the big screen at the match.

=== From education ===
To further publicise Madeleine's disappearance, the pupils of Bishop Ellis Catholic Primary School, the school that she would have attended from September 2007, lined up in the school's playground on 18 June to spell out Find Madeleine. This was easily readable from the air. In August the school announced that they had saved a desk, coat peg and locker for the child.

== Criticism ==
=== Of the public and political reaction ===
The scale of the public reaction provoked negative comment from a number of media commentators. On 16 May 2007 on BBC Radio 4, Matthew Parris said that politicians' displays of concern were "hollow". He also claimed that politicians "read the common newspapers and they decide this is what the common people feel, and they get all caught up with it. But it's all to do with trying to associate themselves with the common herd and they're not part of it. They're politicians." He went on to say, in his column on 17 May, that MPs wearing yellow ribbons was mawkish and an attempt to "tap in to the emotions of the mob". Then on 19 May, The Guardian described the public reaction as hysteria and drew a parallel with the response to the News of the World's anti-paedophile campaign.

Writing in The Times on 16 September, India Knight criticised the on-line community for its censorious attitude and its willingness to rush to judgement whilst pointing out that the McCanns had contributed to the public's obsession with the case by their extensive and well-orchestrated media campaign. A debate on the disappearance was held at the London School of Economics on 30 January 2008. Although the debate was inconclusive, the stridently critical attitude of the on-line community towards the McCanns, noted by Knight, also manifested itself in the audience reaction.

=== Of the media coverage ===
==== Importance of the coverage ====
Some have suggested that the high level of media coverage could be attributable to Madeleine's race, nationality, or socio-economic status. The Independent, in an editorial on 15 May 2007, described the media coverage as showing a warped sense of priorities and condemned the criticism of the Portuguese authorities as jingoism. In his 17 May column in Portugal's Público newspaper, the former head of Portugal's bar association, José Miguel Júdice, said the enormous mobilisation was because the little girl "is English, white, and the daughter of doctors."

On 18 May, Inter Press Service drew attention to the fact that some observers point out that Madeleine comes from a well-heeled British family (both of her parents are doctors), unlike so many Portuguese or immigrant children whose disappearance has drawn scant attention from the press. There has also been criticism of the weight put on this case in the light of many other, unpublicised, children's disappearances.

Also on 18 May, The Scotsman commented that "... there was evidence that public opinion, while strongly supportive of the child's distraught parents Kate and Gerry McCann, was growing alarmed at what it viewed as relentless, almost prurient coverage." Channel 4 News presenter Alex Thomson has said the Madeleine McCann story did not deserve its news ranking. "I've been sickened by the way the media have allowed themselves to be taken for a full-scale ride by the McCanns." He added that the parents' conduct, "a contributory factor in the abduction, was largely downplayed or ignored altogether by sycophantic, gullible blanket coverage."

Raymond Snoddy wrote in Marketing: "To what extent has all this coverage been kept afloat for so long because the child is white and photogenic, and has articulate, resourceful parents? Of course, the news value of the story was also enhanced by context - everyone's worst nightmare, a child snatched from an apparently secure apartment in an upmarket holiday resort. But the sad truth is that if a black child had been snatched from a sink estate in Liverpool or Glasgow, the chances are you would not know their name."

Gerry, who had encouraged media coverage, criticised De Telegraaf on 14 June for publishing a letter claiming to know the location of Madeleine's body, calling it "an irresponsible piece of journalism" and "insensitive and cruel". Portuguese police searched the site but found no trace of Madeleine. At the Edinburgh International Television Festival on 25 August, Gerry complained about the amount of media attention, on the disappearance, that he claimed was 10 times what he had expected. He also criticised wild speculation being erroneously reported as fact.

There was criticism by the Daily Express of the stories run in the Portuguese media. In an article on 28 August that summarised the speculation, the Daily Express accused the local media of "a vile whispering campaign, which has led to them [the McCanns] suffering a daily torrent of smears" and described the stories suggesting that the McCanns had involvement in their daughter's disappearance as "lies".

Journalist Martin Bell accused the BBC of wasting hundreds of thousands of pounds of taxpayers' money in its coverage of the disappearance. In January 2008 Bell said "I'm calling it the death of news. It is the stupidification of the news agenda. It is pretty obvious television news has lost its way not just with the McCann case but that has been extreme."

A comparison was drawn in early March 2008 between the publicity given to Madeleine with the much less intense publicity for the disappearance of Shannon Matthews. The Guardian explained this by stating that "Overarching everything is social class" but they added that Shannon going missing in the UK made a difference. The Independent took the same line saying "Kate and Gerry McCann had a lot: they were a couple of nice middle-class doctors on holiday in an upmarket resort. Karen Matthews is not as elegant, nor as eloquent".

In his book Spoilt Rotten: The Toxic Cult of Sentimentality, Theodore Dalrymple analyses critically the media attention and reaction to the disappearance, and specifically how certain elements in the media interpreted the lack of emotion displayed by the girl's parents as evidence of guilt.

==== Objectivity of the coverage ====
In an interview published on 1 July Martin Brunt, a Sky News journalist who had covered the case extensively, conceded that the media's handling of the Madeleine McCann disappearance had been flawed. "It's the view of a few of us that when we look back over the first two or three weeks of the coverage we were in some ways over-sympathetic. We kind of adopted the tone and the language that the family did. I think we perhaps lost our objectivity a bit, we became a bit too subjective about the story."

The British media has been criticised for being heavily critical of the Portuguese police and legal system. The Guardian noted that the British media compared the Portuguese procedures with British procedures unfavourably and unfairly. Likewise, The Times published an editorial titled "Exactly how guilty are the Portuguese police?" and stated that there had been a rush to judge the Portuguese authorities.

Matthew Parris, writing for The Times in August, chastised the British and Portuguese media for what he described as "assassination-by-innuendo" of suspect Robert Murat, who those involved closely in the case believed was innocent. "For the rest of the world, however, glancing in passing at headlines and skimming news reports over its coffee, the name Murat is now synonymous with 'creepy oddball and obvious suspect'," Parris wrote. He concluded, "The whole disgusting business, the whole media-driven infatuation with this little girl and her parents, the whole sick, morbid, sentimental campaign of news generation and news manipulation, has been a disgrace to the British media."

Peter Horrocks, the head of BBC News, denied claims in September 2007 that the BBC was biased in favour of the McCanns. Some viewers had suggested that the McCanns had been treated in an overly positive light because they were white, middle class doctors. Then Horrocks criticised rival broadcasters, saying "I know that many other TV and radio networks have been absolutely extraordinary, always talking about it in terms of sympathy and their [McCanns] feelings." Writing in The Guardian, also in September, Marcel Berlins said that the investigation had generated a wave of negative comments in the UK media towards Portuguese society, and the authorities investigating the case, as the result of ignorance of the Portuguese legal system. Berlins called it "a touch of arrogant xenophobia".

=== Of the publicity ===
In early July 2007, parents criticised a cinema advertisement about the disappearance of Madeleine which showed a photo of the girl with the statement that she had been "snatched" from her room. The advertisement was being screened across the UK before Shrek the Third, and parents complained to the Advertising Standards Authority that it might scare young children and that it detracted from parents' ability to decide how much to tell their children. Following the protests, the advertisements were quickly withdrawn. Subsequently, however, the advertisement, which had received a U certificate from the British Board of Film Classification, was cleared by the Advertising Standards Authority.

A plan to include bookmarks bearing Madeleine's image in copies of Harry Potter and the Deathly Hallows was shelved. After reflection, the publishers decided it would not be responsible to expose younger readers to the story of Madeleine's disappearance.

Whilst the public response has largely been in support of the Find Maddie campaign, there have been instances where it has been criticised for drawing attention away from other missing children. Mark Lawson, writing in The Guardian on 26 October, criticised the McCanns for employing their own spin doctor, describing their use of what he termed "political methods" as a "terrible error".

Carlos Anjos, president of the Association of Criminal Investigation Staff, criticised the McCanns, on 6 November, for creating a "monster of information" that hindered the investigation. He also stated that they should not have publicised the coloboma in her right eye which he claimed put the life of the girl at risk. This was echoed by Fernando José Pinto Monteiro, the Attorney General, who said that, if she had been abducted, the worldwide campaign would have turned Madeleine into a liability and that it was likely that her abductor had already killed her.

== Rewards ==
Rewards offered totalled over £2.6 million including:

- £1,500,000 (€2,200,000) including £250,000 by the News of the World, £250,000 by Sir Philip Green, £50,000 by Simon Cowell and £25,000 by Coleen McLoughlin. Other contributors include Sir Richard Branson, JK Rowling, and Bill Kenwright.
- £1,000,000 (€1,470,000) by British businessman Stephen Winyard.
- £100,000 (€147,000) by a colleague of Kate McCann.
- €15,000 (£10,250) by Portuguese newspaper Record.
