= Mark Warner Ltd =

British holiday company

Mark Warner is an independent British tour operator founded in 1974 by entrepreneurs Mark Chitty and Andrew Searle. Based in London, it originally specialised in singles' and couples' ski holidays in just one chalet in Switzerland but has since expanded into family and beach resort holidays.

== Overview ==
Mark Warner's current summer destinations include four beach resorts in Greece and one in Turkey, with facilities including tennis and water-sports centres. Its winter ski programme include one chalet hotel in Tignes in the French Alps.

Mark Warner has a childcare programme but certain ski properties are reserved for adults, in keeping with the original idea.

In 2012, the Levante Beach Resort on Rhodes, a 5-star resort built to Mark Warner's own specifications, was added to the portfolio.

In 2010 ex-Savills director Giles Gale launched a new associated business - Mark Warner Property - to specialise in the sales and marketing of ski property developments in Austria. In 2012 the business was expanded into Switzerland with a particular focus on Grimentz and the Valais region.

In 2014, Mark Warner Holidays was a three-time winner in the British Travel Awards (Best Family Tour Operator [Medium size], Best Activity & Adventure Operator [Medium size] and Best All Inclusive Operator [Medium Size]). It was Best Ski Operator according to the Telegraph Travel Awards.

== Controversies ==
In 2007, three-year-old Madeleine McCann was allegedly abducted from an apartment in Praia da Luz, Portugal, which had been booked through Mark Warner. The company later launched legal action against its insurers to recover earnings lost after holidaymakers stayed away from the Praia da Luz resort due to media coverage of the disappearance, and in 2015 closed its Ocean Club resort in the town.

Mark Warner's childcare services were criticised in the BBC's Whistleblower programme in February 2008. It was discovered that staff were working illegally in Egypt, using tourist visas instead of work visas. The company subsequently issued a statement saying: "It is company policy that all childcare staff employed by Mark Warner must supply two references and submit a form to check their criminal record. There were clearly two occasions where we failed to do this." It apologised and said it would tighten up its procedures.

In December 2016, Mark Warner wrote to all of its customers holding live bookings, adding a £50 per person surcharge citing the Pound to Euro exchange rate. The company insisted it was within its rights under booking conditions to make such a charge.
