= Arguido =

Named subject in Portuguese investigations

Arguido (pronounced [ɐɾˈɣwiðu]; if male) or arguida (pronounced [ɐɾˈɣwiðɐ]; if female), normally translated "named suspect" or "formal suspect", is a status in Portuguese type legal systems, including those of Portugal, Macau, Angola and Mozambique. It is given to a person whom the authorities suspect may have committed an offence. This designation does not exist in certain other jurisdictions. In a criminal investigation a person has to be declared an arguido prior to being arrested. Portuguese law makes a distinction between arguido and suspect.

== The rights of an arguido ==
If a person becomes an arguido, they automatically gain certain rights that a witness or suspect would not have. An arguido has the right to be accompanied by a lawyer when questioned. The investigating police may ask the arguido more direct accusatory questions (the answers to which would not be admissible in court if possibly self-incriminatory and asked of a non-arguido) but the arguido must be presented with whatever evidence is held against them, and unlike a witness has the right to remain silent, not to answer any question that may incriminate the person, and does not face legal action for lying.

Witnesses in criminal investigations are legally bound to co-operate with the police and do not have the right to silence and face legal actions if they lie. Because of the legal advantages, some individuals apply for arguido status to be given to themselves, e.g. when it would appear that the police suspect them but are trying to use their witness status to extract as much information as possible.

A person who has arguido status has not been formally accused of a crime, arrested or charged, and not all arguidos are subsequently charged. The police may ask a court to restrict an arguido's movement and oblige them to not leave the country. Arguidos cannot change their place of residence without permission from a court. There is no time limit on the status.

== Comparison with common-law administrations ==
The status is very similar to that of being "questioned under caution" under the Police and Criminal Evidence Act in the United Kingdom or being questioned after being read one's "Miranda Rights" in the United States, specifically the right to legal representation, the liberty to refuse to answer questions, and the admissibility in court of statements taken whilst in those statuses.

== Etymology ==
Arguido derives from the Latin arguire or arguere. The English words argue and argument have the same etymology.
