= Praia da Luz =

Luz
- Civil parish
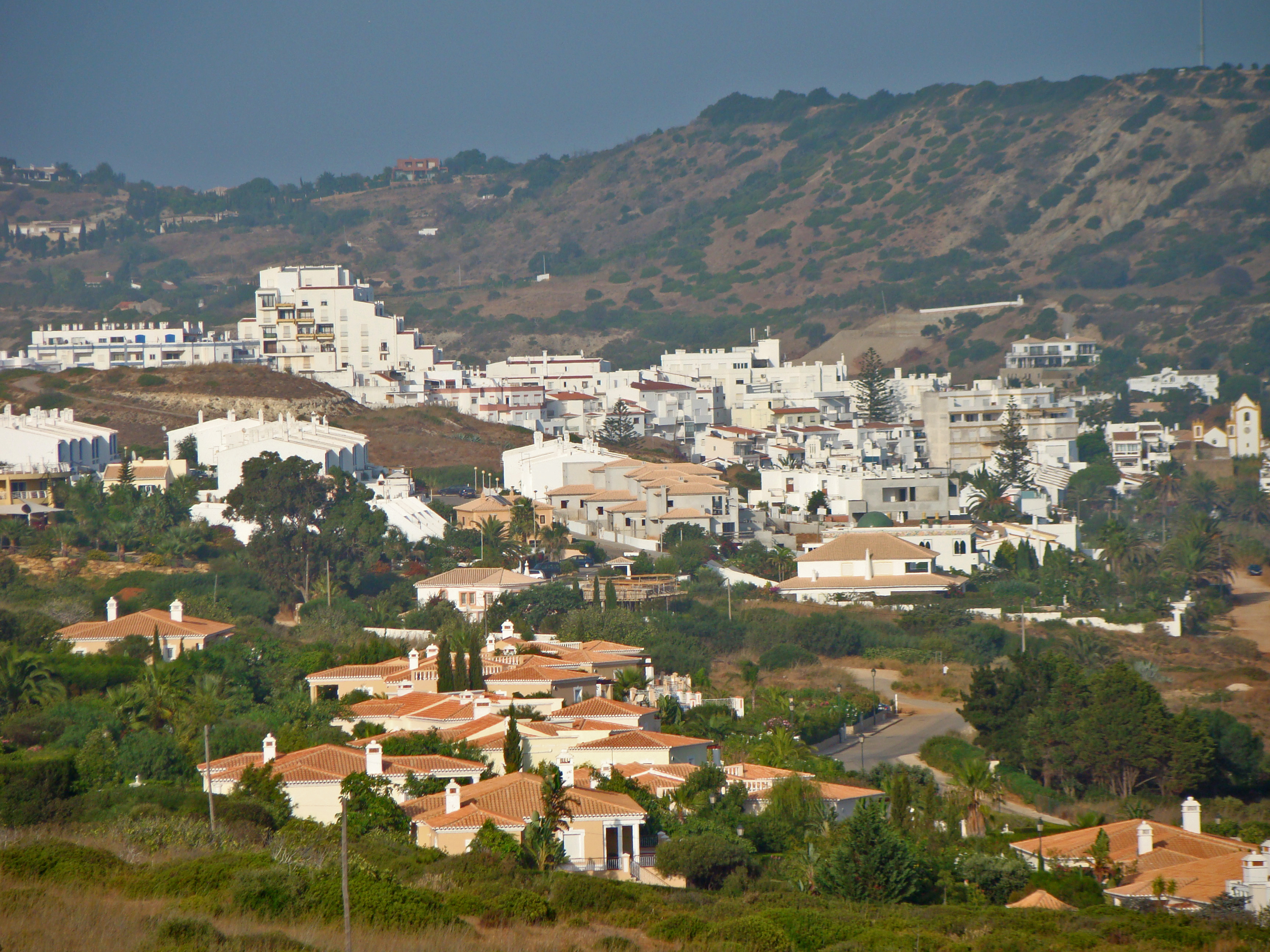

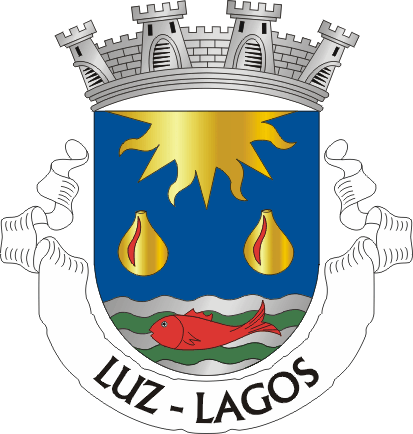
- Coat of arms

- Location in Portugal
- Coordinates: 37°05′12″N 08°43′52″W
- Country: Portugal
- Region: Algarve
- Intermunic. comm.: Algarve
- District: Faro
- Municipality: Lagos

Area
  - Total: 21.78 km^{2} (8.41 sq mi)

Population (2011)
  - Total: 3,545
  - Density: 162.8/km^{2} (421.6/sq mi)
- Time zone: UTC+00:00 (WET)
  - Summer (DST): UTC+01:00 (WEST)
- Postal code: 8600
- Area code: 282
- Patron: Nossa Senhora da Luz
- Website: http://www.freguesia-luz.pt/portal/v1.0/

Praia da Luz (European Portuguese pronunciation: [ˈpɾajɐ ðɐ ˈluʃ]), officially Luz, is a civil parish of the municipality of Lagos, in Algarve region, Portugal. The population of the civil parish in 2011 was 3,545, in an area of 21.78 km^{2} (9½ sq. mi.). Also known as Santorini de Portugal, Luz de Lagos or Vila da Luz (a contraction of its former official name, Vila da Nossa Senhora da Luz), "Praia da Luz" (which means Beach of the Light) is used to refer to both the urbanized village and the beach. The parish had its origins in a small fishing village (the industry is now only found in isolated enclaves to the west), but was transformed by several holiday-villa complexes into a tourist area.

== History ==
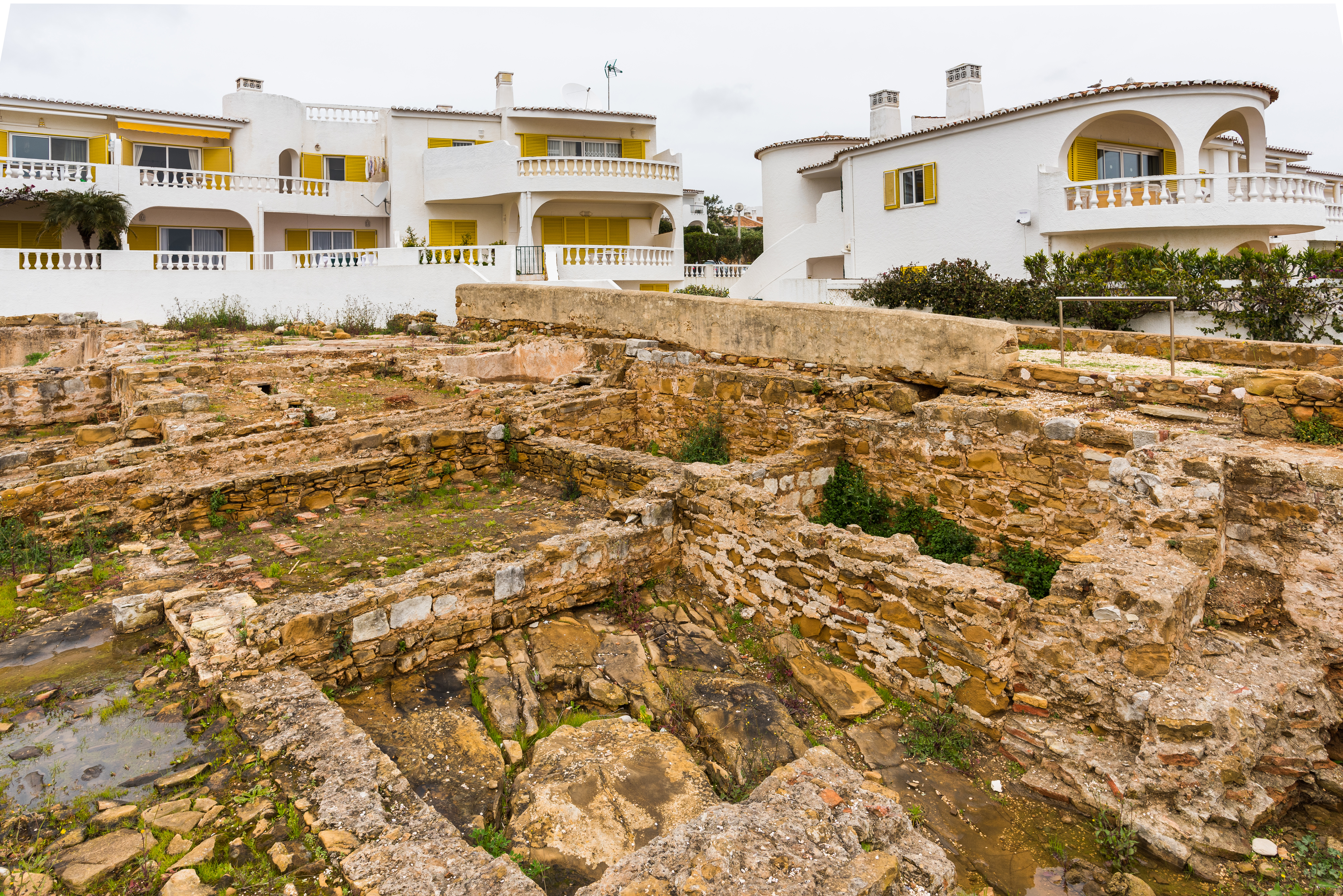
The archaeological site of Roman salting and fish processing centre

Historians Estácio da Veiga and José da Encarnação have proved that settlements of Luz have existed for millennia, and that many cultures have crossed the territory. At the end of the 19th century, various castros were discovered in the area of Serro Grande, that included various funerary tombs with galleries, dating to the Neolithic period. In these sites there were vestiges of Neolithic implements, artefacts from the Iron Age, and as a rock axe discovered in Espiche. The existence of human artifacts and shell mounds in the area suggest human presence before organized civilization.

Remnants of a Roman spa are among the more important archaeological discoveries of the modern municipality. After the decline of the Pax Romana, the Algarve was visited by peoples from the lands of ancient Morocco. They established many of the fruit orchards that continue to exist in the foothills of Luz. Moorish rule in the Algarve resulted in assimilation of the indigenous cultures, transforming the region into a major economic power.

Reconquista resulted in expulsion of the Moors from the Algarve, in the institutionalization of Christianity and the building of churches. During the Middle Ages, the parish was officially referred to as Nossa Senhora da Luz.

King Manuel I, through his 1 June 1504 foral, recognized the importance of Lagos, in the Kingdom of the Algarve, for the quantity of fish catches at the time (primarily of tuna and sardine caught in Luz). Three factories eventually developed in the region, the most recent developing in 1884, which served to conserve fish in olive oil, preceding the salting of sardine in the same fashion. These factories supported 100 workers, with the majority (60) women. Much later, another factory, in Espiche, was also constructed (but today only the ruins remain). Luz was also a major producer of figs (regularly exported to the fine sweets industry that developed), while wheat and barley were being cultivated in many of the parcels around the parish seat.

Much like many of the coastal communities of Portugal, Luz was susceptible to attacks by pirates from North Africa. Luz was frequently attacked by Moors, who plied the water of the Algarve, attacked small settlements, and pillaged the treasures of the churches and homes of its residents. The priest Vicente Benevides noted that the original image of Nossa Senhora da Luz was taken by the Moors in one of those raids. Forces loyal to the King discovered the image, and the King returned it to Luz, where he ordered the construction of a fortress to safeguard the image and protect the community. Within the fortress, a tower was constructed in 1624 and a wall was later added to circle the fortress, by the then Captain-General of the Kingdom of the Algarve, the Count of Pontével.

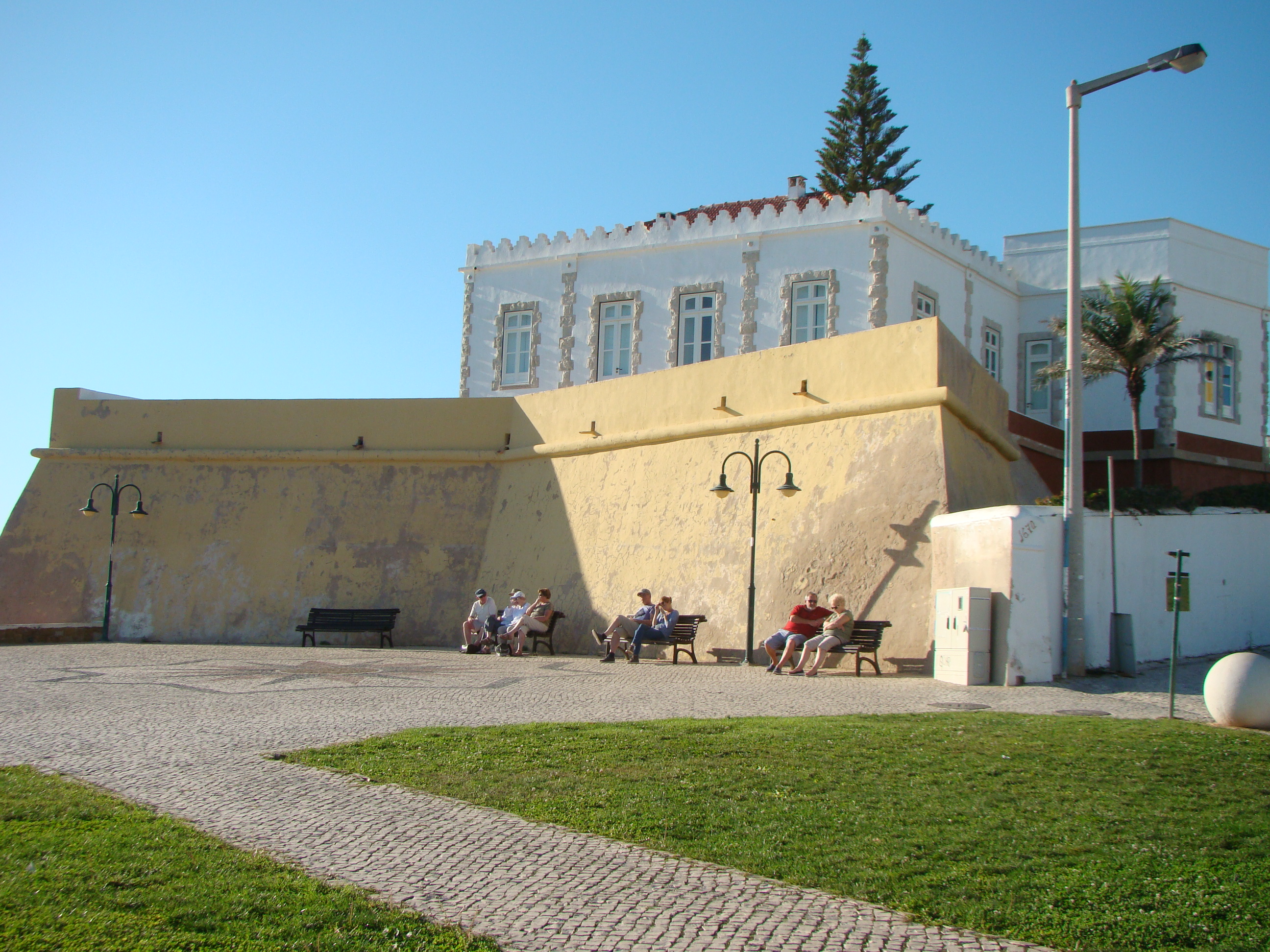
Castelo da Senhora da Luz, a fortress constructed between 1640 and 1670

The parish of Luz was formally constituted in 1673. The origins of the settlement date to the construction of a fortress in the area of Luz, and the presence of fishermen along the coast, especially after the establishment of an industry in the 15th and 16th centuries, when sardine fishing employed around 90 men.

At the beginning of the 18th century, the parish of Luz was de-annexed from the main parish of Santa Maria.

The use of the name Praia da Luz is actually a recent trend in the vernacular. Introduced by sunbathers, it was first recorded in 1928, and its use increased rapidly in the second half of the 20th century, with the tourist influx. Yet there still remains a distinction between the modern civil parish of Luz, and the medieval centre, which latter includes the historical village.

Praia da Luz became more familiar to the international public in 2007, when British tourist Madeleine McCann disappeared from a holiday flat (her whereabouts still remain unknown), as her parents ate at a nearby tapas restaurant.

== Geography ==
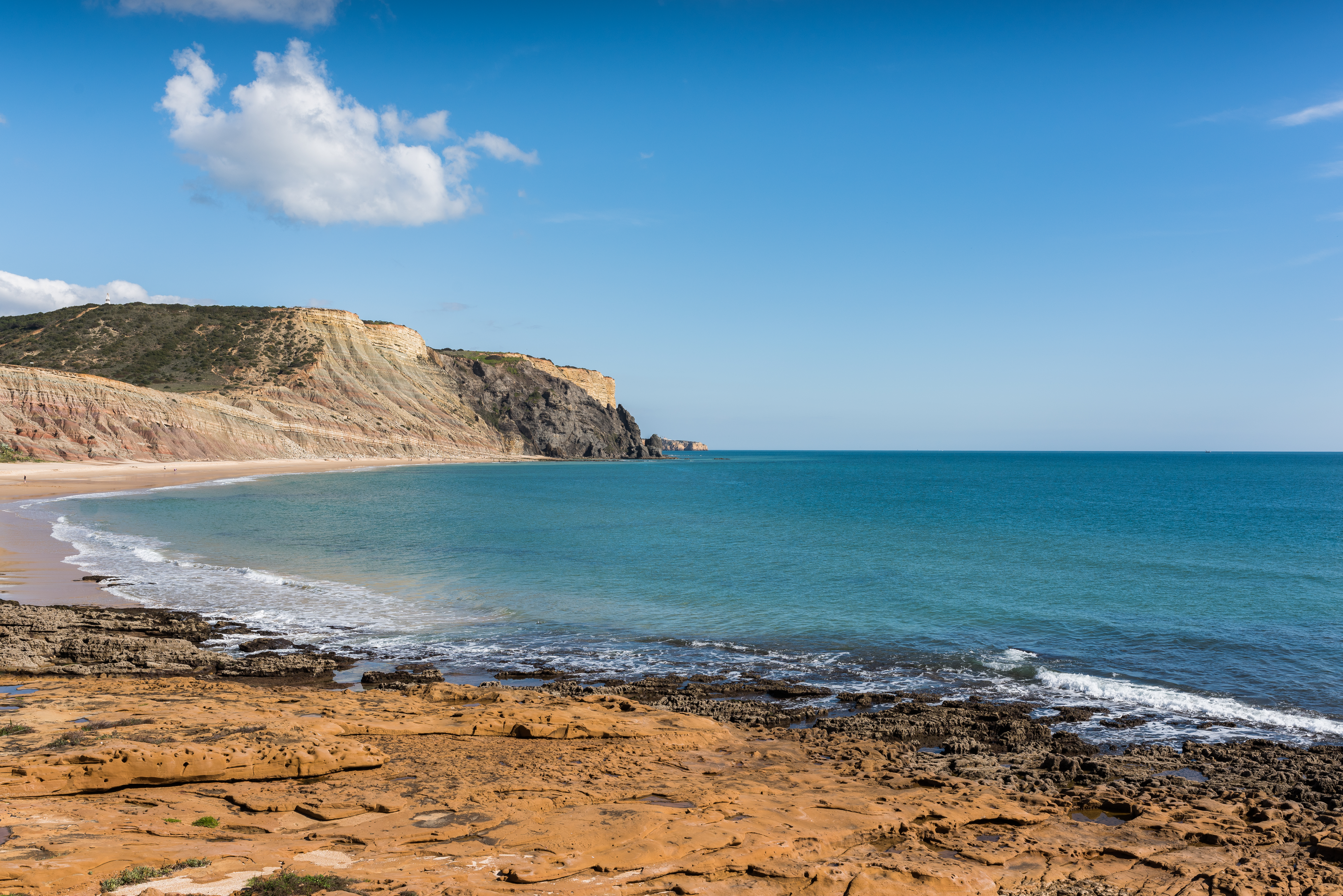
The cliffs of Praia da Luz

Luz is located in the southwest corner of the municipality of Lagos, and covers an area of 21.78 km^{2} (8½ sq. mi.). It is about 6 kilometres (3.7 mi) from the city of Lagos proper. It is bordered to the south by the Atlantic Ocean, to the north by the civil parish of Barão de São João, to the east by Santa Maria and São Sebastião, and it is adjacent to the civil parish of Budens, in the municipality of Vila do Bispo. The parish includes three settlements (Luz, Espiche and Almádena).

The relief of the parish is marked by two mountainous areas, Montinhos da Luz (99 metres; 325 feet) and Montinhos do Burgau (68 metres; 223 feet), while four ravines flow from north to south: Ribeira do Vale de Barão, Ribeira de Almadena, Ribeira de Espiche and Ribeira da Luz. The beach in Praia da Luz is an intermediate-size Blue Flag beach with two distinct zones: the white sand beach and rocky cliff zone, characteristic of the Algarve. While the waters are typically clean and transparent, its temperatures are variable, owing to the influence of the Atlantic currents.

Demographically, the older parish of Luz was a small centre. By the 18th century, following the 1755 Lisbon earthquake, the region was decimated, and many of its residents abandoned the region. The development of the region only began in the second half of the 19th century. The census of 1893 indicated a population of fewer than 1,712 inhabitants.

== Economy ==
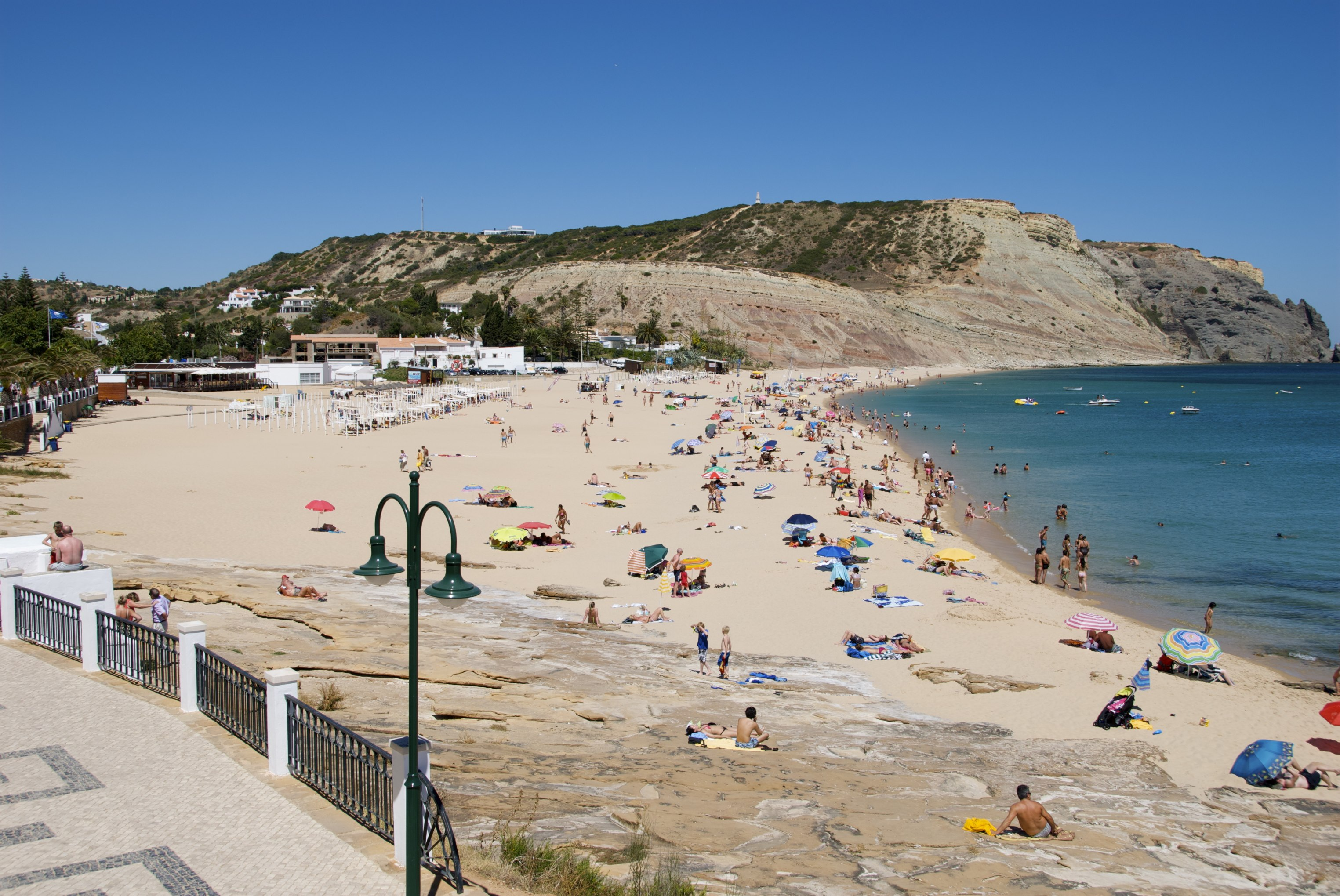
Part of the beach of Praia da Luz, showing many tourists that seasonally visit it.

Luz is dominated by its beach, and extends as far as the cliffs of the southern coast, and part of the Algarvian Gold Coast (Portuguese: Costa de Oiro). During the Age of Discovery, fishing was the spur that developed the settlements of Luz during the 13th and 14th centuries, progressing to whaling by the 16th century: it constitutes one of the more important economic poles of socio-economic development with the municipality of Lagos. Fishing, including octopus potting, was the predominant occupation in Praia da Luz until it was surpassed by tourism in the 1980s; the resort industry developed around the old fishing village.

Luz's beach and setting have attracted many visitors to the region, resulting in a shift from an economy based on fishing to one providing services for tourists. Along the beach, many of the canning plants were closed and replaced by windsurfing and diving schools, as well as discos, restaurants and shops tailored to the needs of the seasonal visitor. The once prominent casino closed, and was replaced by a local primary school, before becoming the seat of the parish government and health centre.

Similarly, many of the agricultural fields were purchased by developers, resulting in the building of many holiday villages, apartments, hotels and resorts.

Many of the fishermen became employees of the hotel industry, while the cannery employees, welders and farmers began working in civil construction.

The settlements of Luz have become holiday destinations for citizens primarily from the United Kingdom, Ireland, France and Germany, as well as residents of Portugal.

== Architecture ==
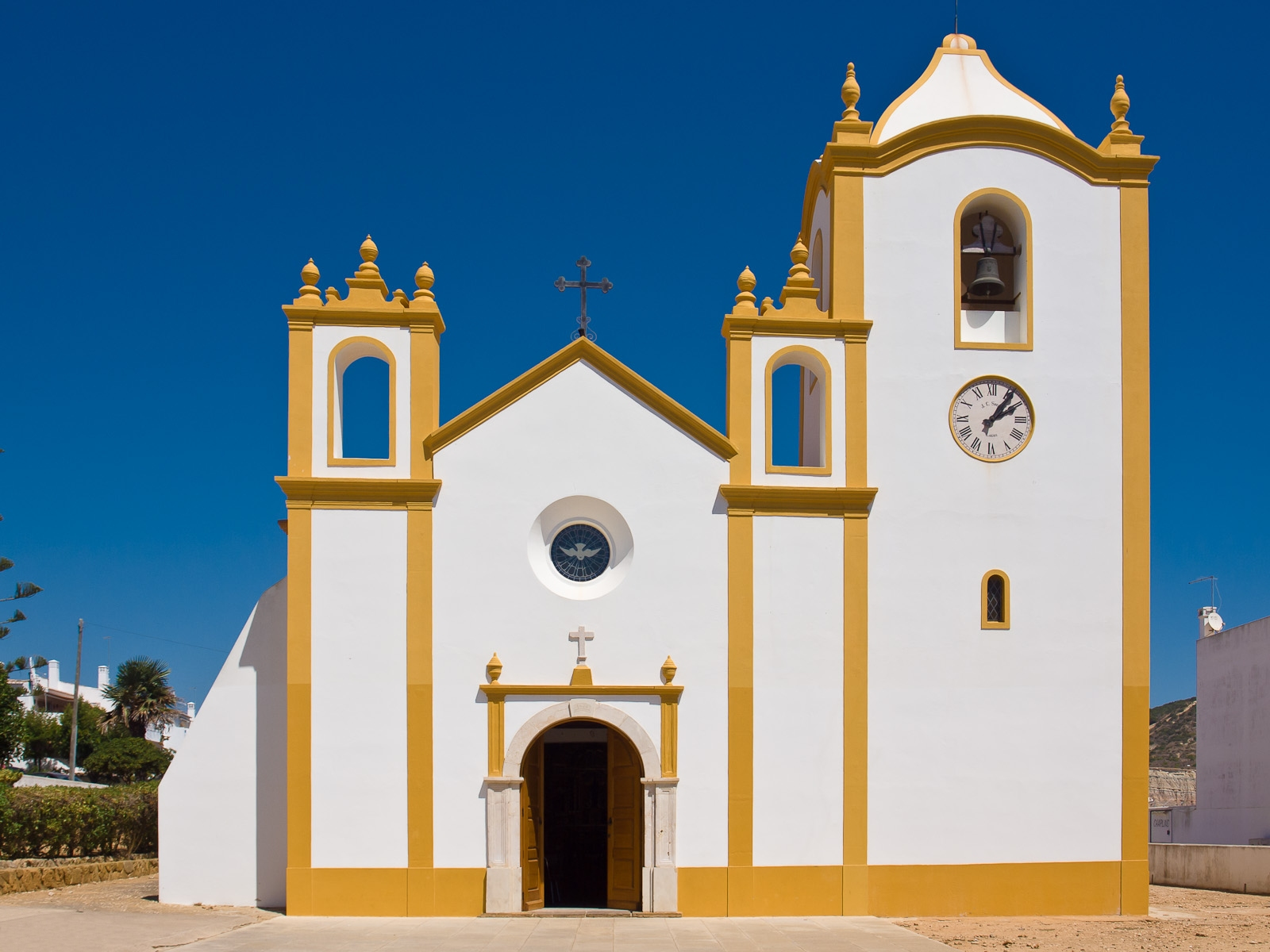
The Church of Nossa Senhora da Luz, reconstructed in 1874 by local contributions after the 1755 Lisbon earthquake.

The visitor to Luz encounters many façades with Manueline-era architectural motifs. There are many habitational structures that correspond to the estilo chão ("ground style") typical of the rural buildings that date back to the end of the 18th century. In the first half of the 19th century, many of the more official homes and buildings began to appear in the Algarvian Neo-baroque style. Meanwhile, the period was also marked by simple single-storey homes, covered in tiled roofs, typical of Luz.

=== Civic ===
- Mr. Biller's Garden (Portuguese: Jardim de Mr. Biller)
- Roman Archaeological Site of Praia da Luz: located on a promontory overlooking the village, there are few visible signs of this archaeological discovery, which consists of a small Roman bath complex located alongside the main parochial church

=== Military ===
- Atalaia Tower (Portuguese: Torre de Atalaia)
- Castle of Senhora da Luz (Portuguese: Castelo da Senhora da Luz/Fortaleza de Nossa senhora da Luz), is a 17th-century military stronghold, constructed to support the defense of the southern Algarve, located along the Ponta da Calheta;

=== Religious ===
- Church of Nossa Senhora da Luz (Portuguese: Igreja da Nossa Senhora da Luz). Dedicated to Our Lady of the Light, this medieval church was built around 1521, and was routinely sacked in the 15th and 16th centuries, resulting in the construction of protective walls and defences. During the 1755 Lisbon earthquake it was badly damaged, and its restoration (1874) was funded by local contributions. In the 20th century, two events (a violent storm and the 1969 earthquake) caused similar damage to the church body.

== See also ==
- Almádena
- Espiche
- Disappearance of Madeleine McCann
