= Espiche =

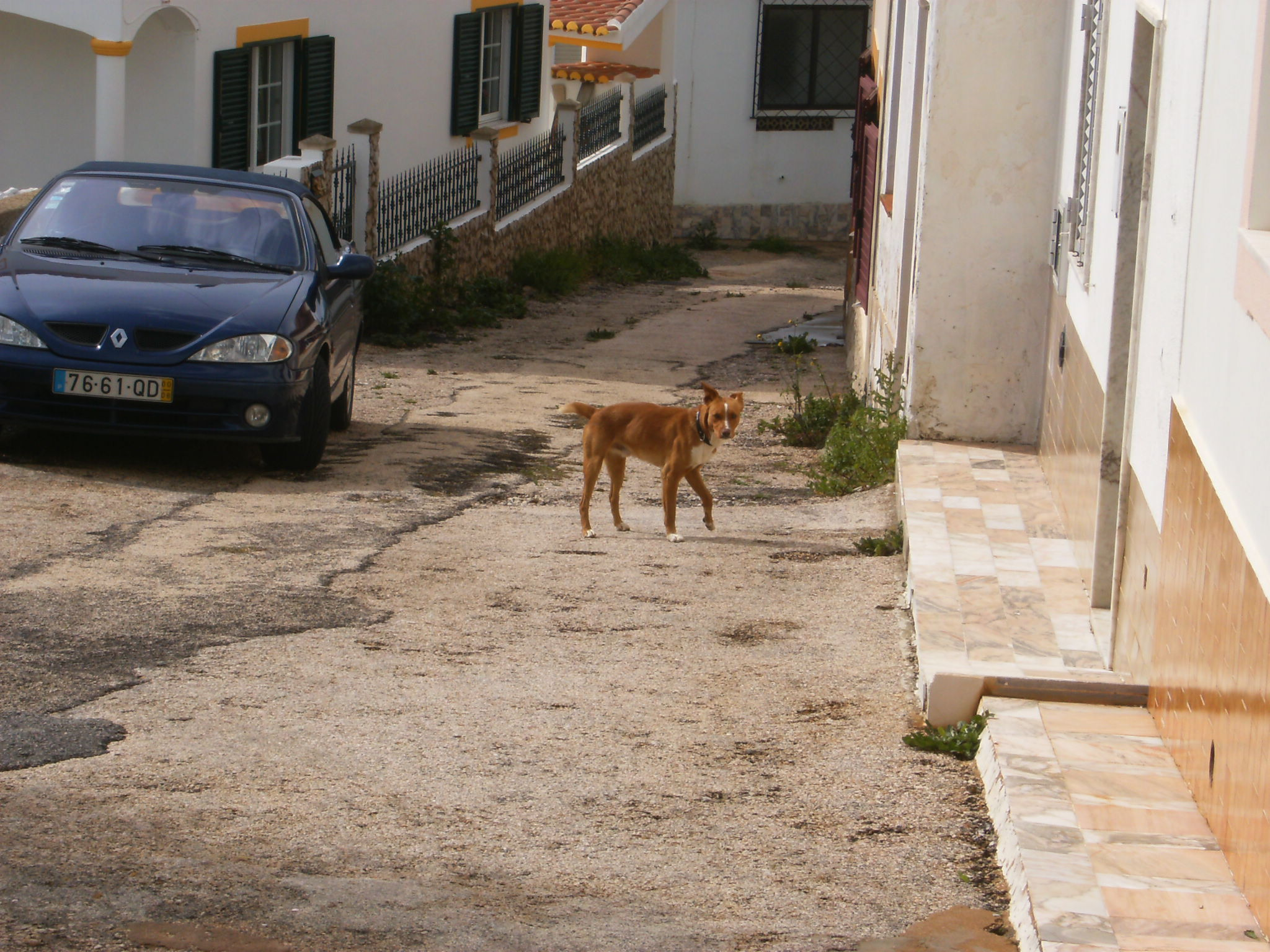
- A street in Espiche.

- Location within Portugal
- Coordinates: 37°6′5.38″N 8°44′19.44″W

Espiche is a village of the civil parish of Luz, in the municipality of Lagos, in Algarve region, Portugal.

== History ==
The village has seen major developments since the 1980s, with the increase of the tourism industry in the region. The land value has increased dramatically, but the populational density is still relatively low. In the summer months the town has the most of its economic activity, and also most of the housing space, occupied by tourists. Since the town is very near the ocean (2 km) it was mostly a fishing community, and relatively poor, before the 1980s.

The community is known for its local golf course.
