= Bensafrim =

- Civil parish
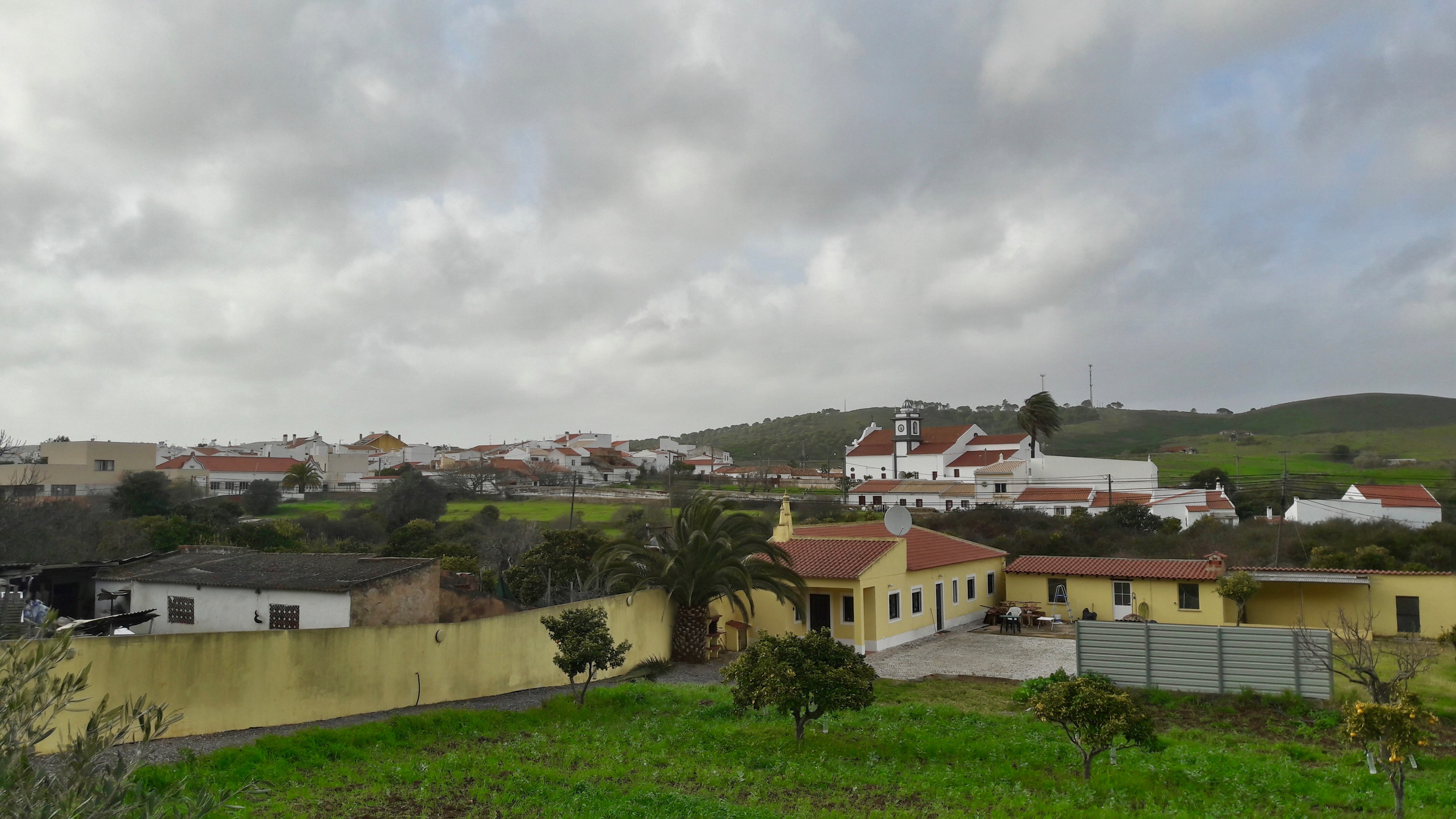

- Location in Portugal
- Coordinates: 37°09′N 8°44′W
- Country: Portugal
- Region: Algarve
- Intermunic. comm.: Algarve
- District: Faro
- Municipality: Lagos
- Disbanded: 2013

Area
  - Total: 78.46 km^{2} (30.29 sq mi)

Population
  - Total: 2,004
  - Density: 25.54/km^{2} (66.15/sq mi)
- Time zone: UTC+00:00 (WET)
  - Summer (DST): UTC+01:00 (WEST)
- Postal code: 8600
- Website: http://bensafrim.net/index.php?option=com_frontpage&Itemid=1

Bensafrim (European Portuguese pronunciation: [bẽsɐˈfɾĩ]) is a former civil parish in the municipality of Lagos, Portugal. In 2013, the parish merged into the new parish Bensafrim e Barão de São João. It has about 2,004 inhabitants (2001).

The name comes from the Arabic word Benassaharim. It used to be an agrarian community. Until the 1950s the most important means of transportation were the ox and the donkey. Now it is a dormitory suburb of Lagos.

The most important event of the year is the annual fair on the 25th and 26 August. The fair first took place in 1880.

In the last years, there has been much building activity. A new square, sports fields, a medical post, water supplies and also the roads were improved. From Bensafrim there is a connection to the A22 now.

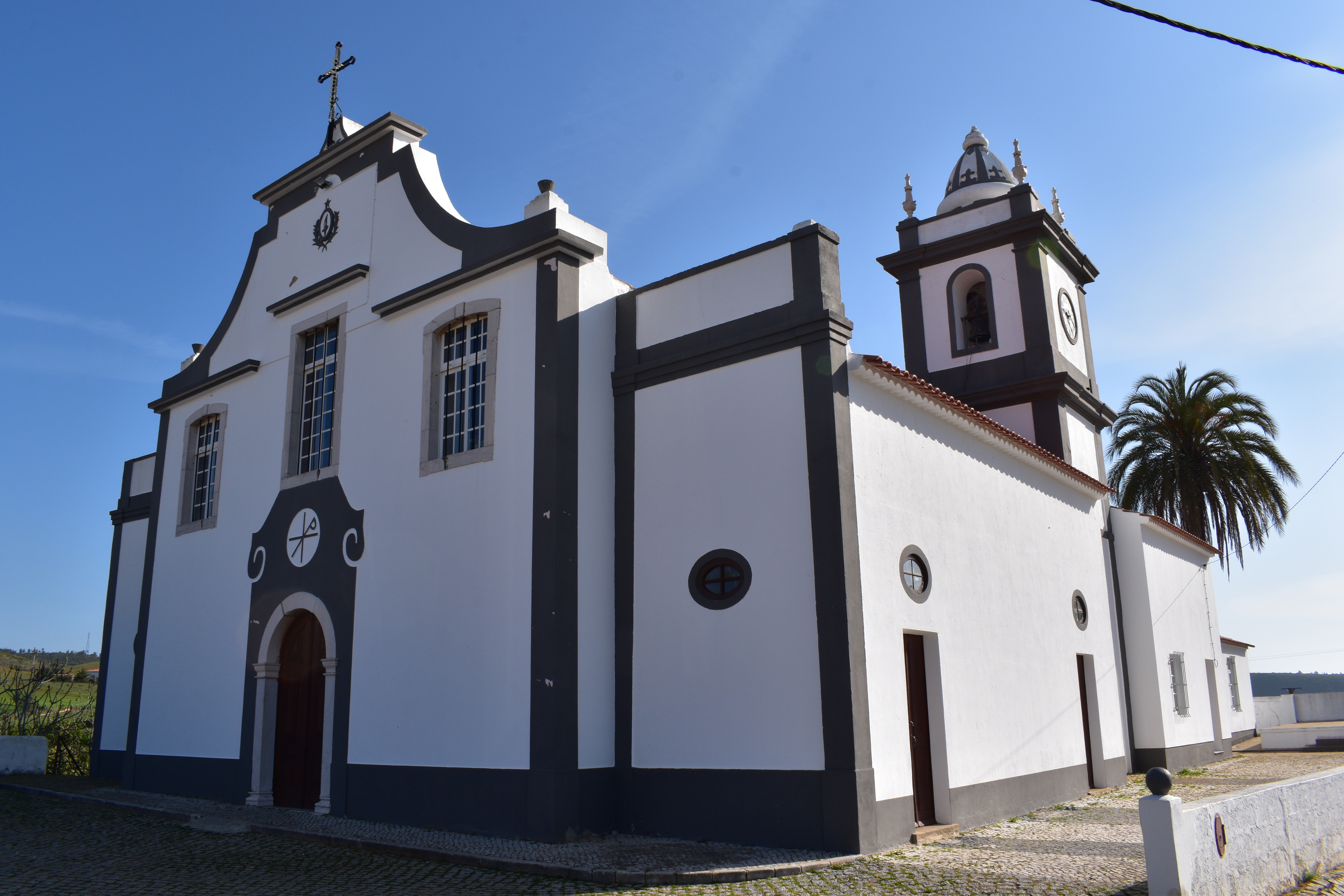
Bensafrim Mother church
