= Fort Nossa Senhora da Luz (Lagos) =

Fort in Luz, Lagos, Portugal

- Fortaleza de Nossa Senhora da Luz; Castelo da Senhora da Luz
- Faro, Algarve, Algarve in Portugal
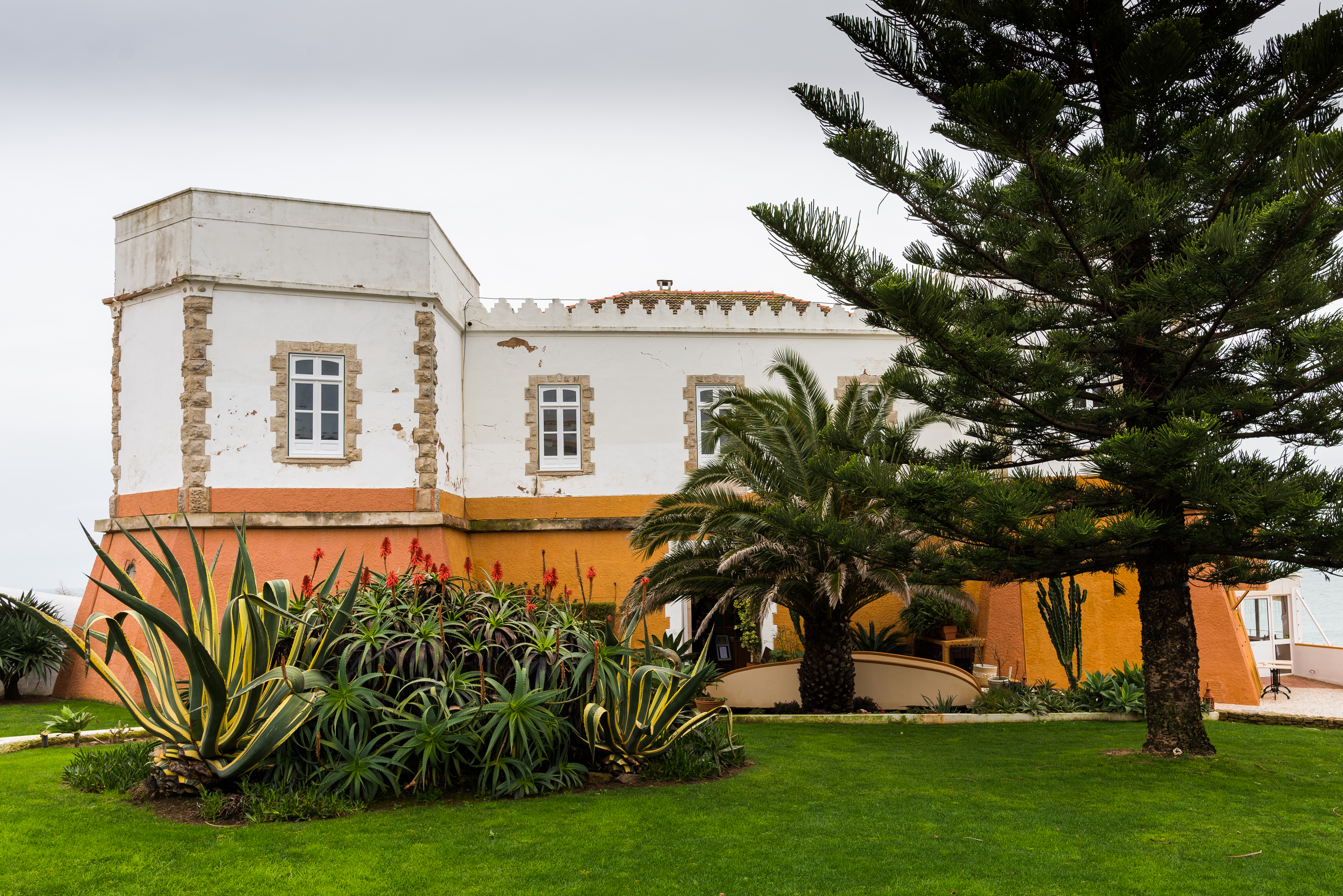
- Interior facade of the former-Castle of Senhora da Luz

Site information
- Type: Castle
- Owner: Portuguese Republic
- Operator: Private
- Open to the public: Public

Location
- Coordinates: 37°5′6.6″N 8°43′49.8″W

Site history
- Built: 17th century
- Materials: Stone, Masonry, Wood, Tile

The Fort Nossa Senhora da Luz (Portuguese: Fortaleza de Nossa Senhora da Luz), also known locally as Castle of Senhora da Luz (Portuguese: Castelo da Senhora da Luz) is a fort in the civil parish of Luz, municipality of Lagos in the Portuguese Algarve, classified as a Property of Public Interest (Imóvel de Interesse Público).

== History ==
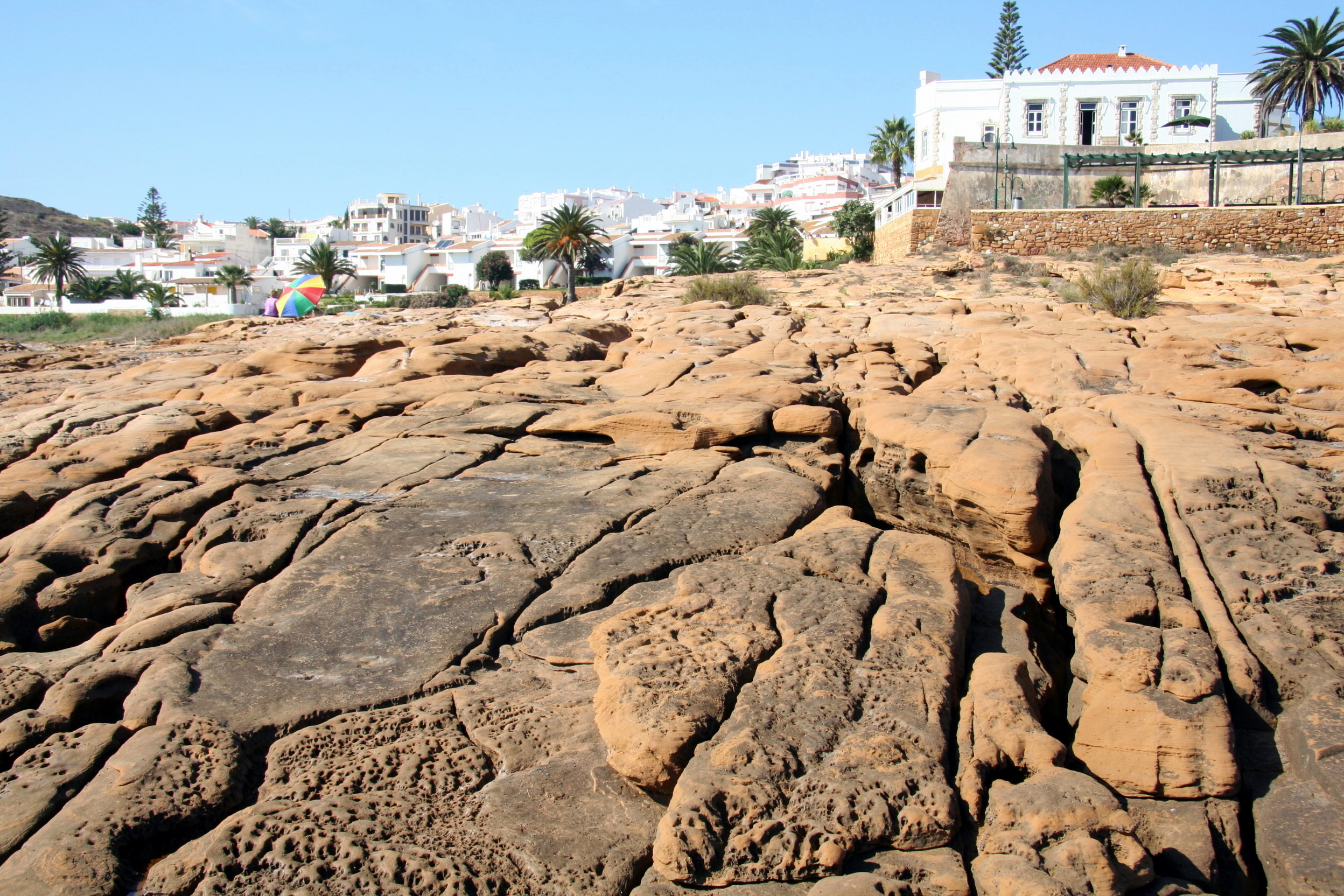
A view of the fortress from the rocky shore

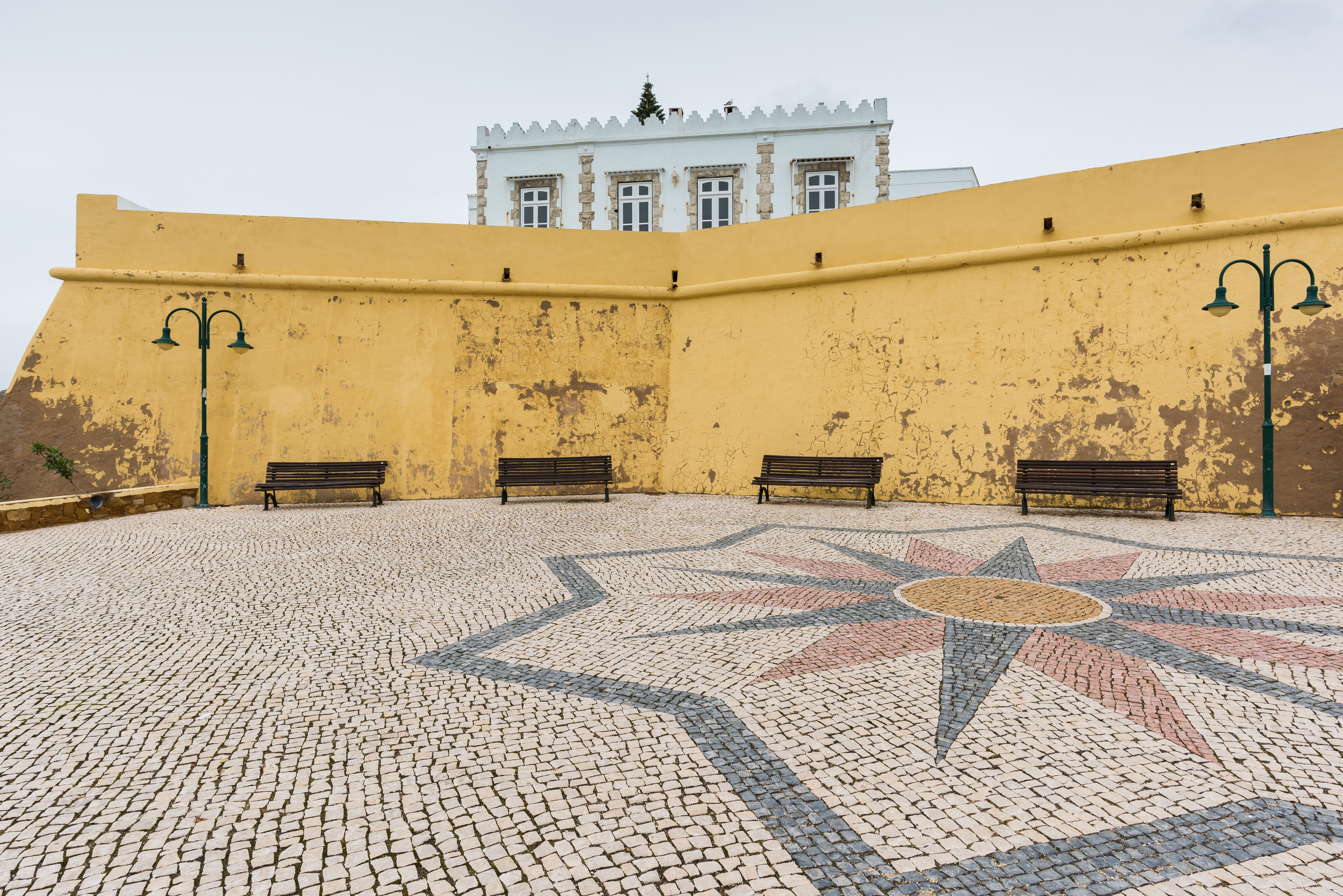
The lateral facade of the fortress showing the two-story interior building peaking from within the courtyard

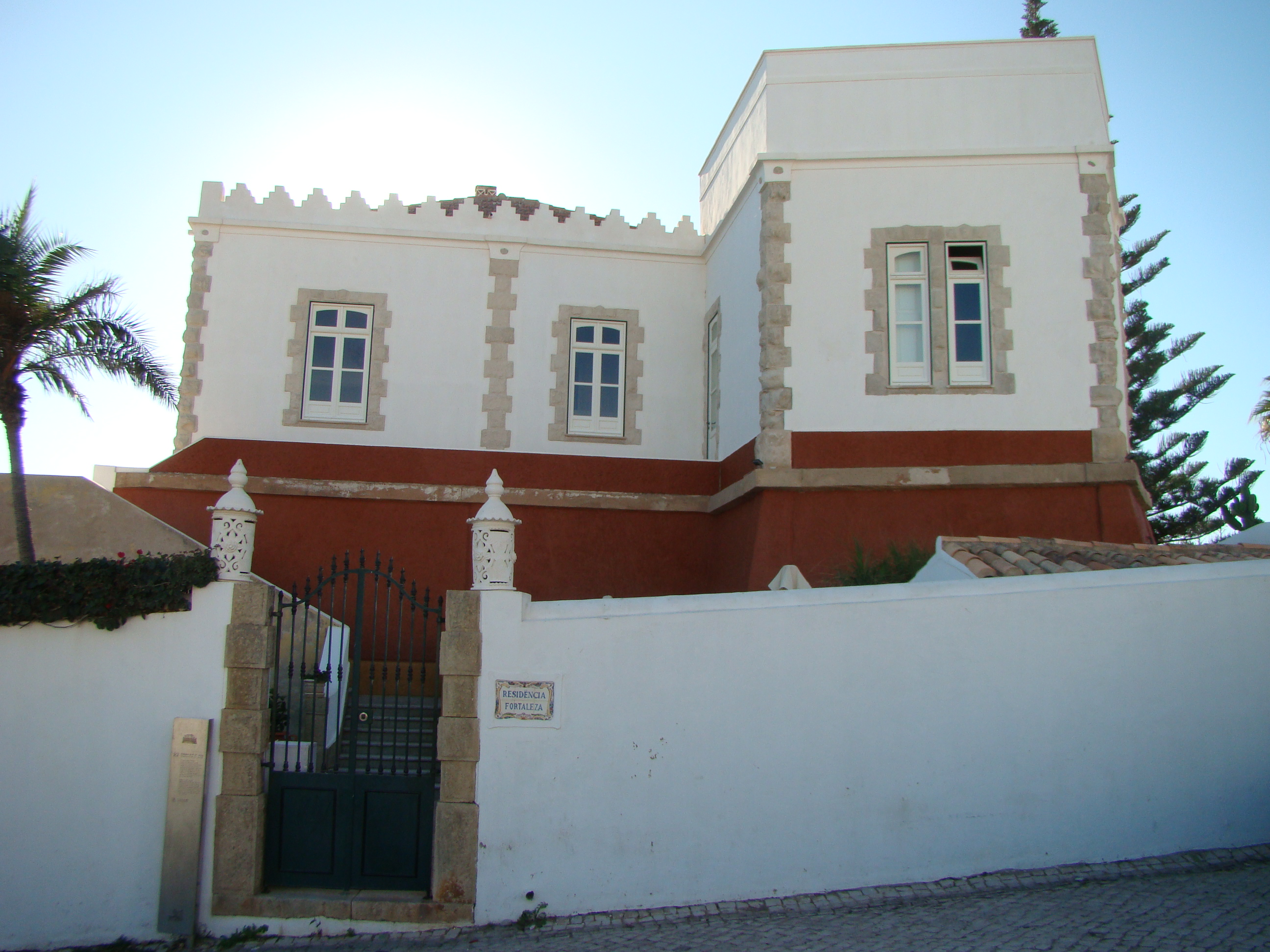
Lateral entranceway to the fort

The fort is one of the most important examples of 17th century military architecture on the Algarve coast; it illustrates the Portuguese Restoration's concern to provide defense to the southern territory. Although there were fortifications in the region before 1640, there are few remnants.

It is unclear when the first primitive stronghold was constructed on the site: a medieval fortress built in 1575. During the course of the construction, a circular watchtower was erected within the fortress in 1624.

The first fortification along Ponta da Calheta occurred during the Philippine Dynasty, and its ongoing construction is seen as an extension of Spanish policy to protect the Algarve when the great European armadas and privateers pillaged Spanish/Portuguese fleets. The modern fort has little of these Philippine influences: it is the product of a vast process of militarization and fortification of the country, following the Portuguese Restoration of Independence (1640) and the Wars then carried out by the two peninsular kingdoms.

Unlike the small watchtower, the post-Restoration changes saw the construction of a stronghold. The polygonal plan, with four angular bastions defines the typical irregular quadrilateral approaching the star-shape fortresses used in numerous other fortifications. The fact that the works lasted until (at least) 1670 is an indicator of the importance of this fortress and the care with which it was built. Unfortunately, its current state belies the grand project of the 16th century. The walls, which were initially 5 metres (16 ft) high, were partially submerged by sand dunes (except to the sea). Its interior was also occupied by a two-story, eclectic building that functioned as a restaurant.

Decades of construction and remodelling in the interior have washed-away the real organization of the interior spaces that in 1821 incorporated two great pavilions.

== Architecture ==
The 200 square metres (2,200 ft^{2}) fort is situated on Ponta da Calheta in an isolated, urban area extending out to the south and west over the sea. To the east is a roadway and to the north urban buildings, while to the northeast is the Church of Nossa Senhora da Luz.

The polygonal castle includes bastions at its angles, with articulated volumes covered in tile and northern central doorway.

The interior of the primitive military construction were repurposed for tourist use.
