= Almádena =

- Village
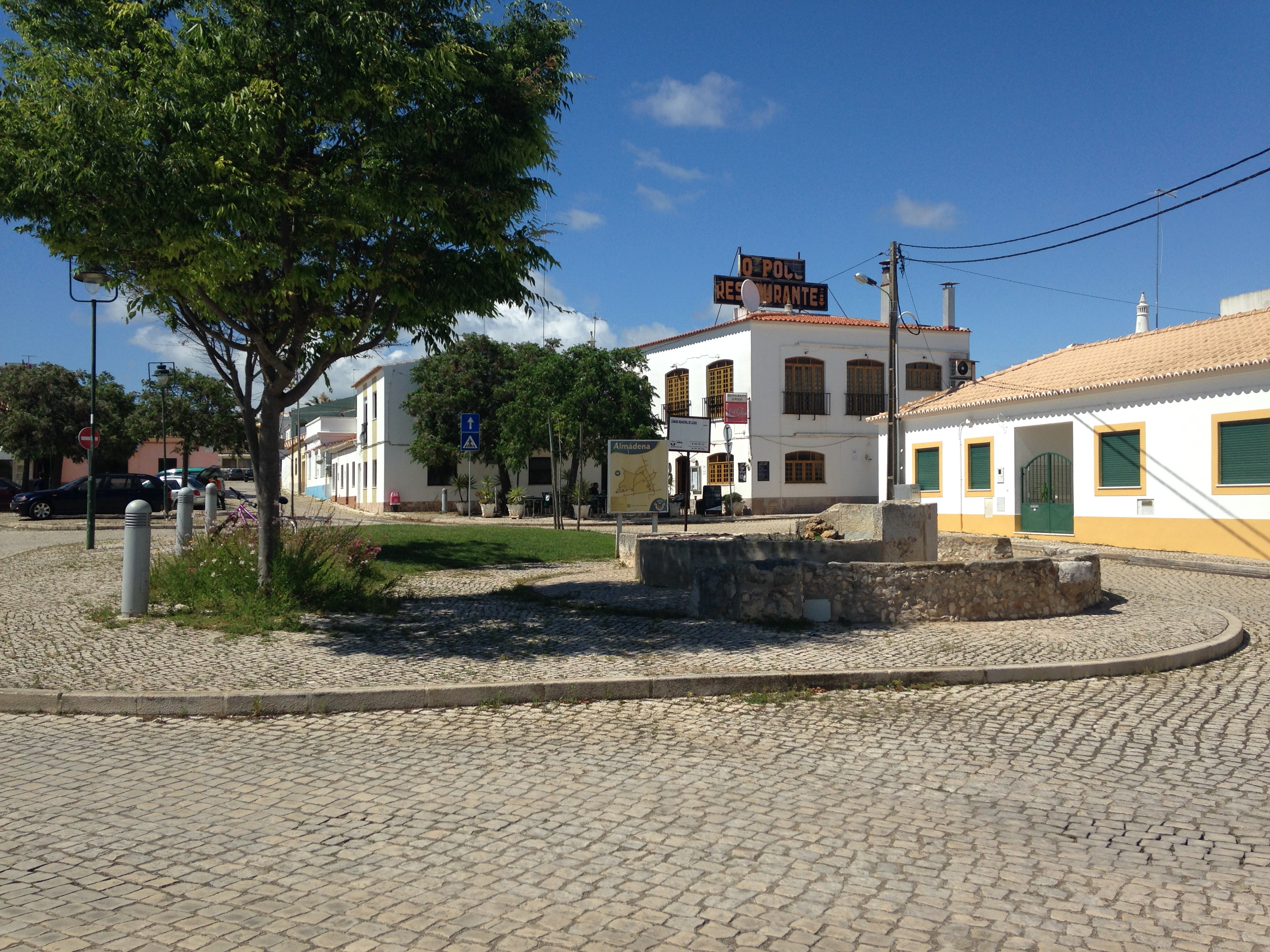
- O Largo do Poço, the village square in Almádena
- Interactive map of Almádena
- Coordinates: 37.0948°N 8.7684°W
- Country: Portugal
- Region: Algarve
- Municipio: Lagos
- Freguesia: Luz
- Elevation: 14 m (46 ft)

Population (2011)
  - Total: 573
- Time zone: UTC0 (WET)
  - Summer (DST): UTC-1 (WEST)
- Postal Zone: 8600-102 Lagos
- Area Code & Prefix: (+351) 282 XXX-XXXX
- ISO 3166 code: PT

Almádena (Portuguese pronunciation: [alˈmaðɛnɐ]) is a village located in Portugal's western Algarve. Administratively, it is part of the civil parish (freguesia) of Luz (popularly known as Praia da Luz), and the municipality (município) of Lagos.

== Etymology ==
According to certain authorities, the toponym 'Almádena' has an Arabic origin, like many place names in the area. The name could derive from the Arabic word for minaret (al-madin). An alternative etymology for the village's name is the Arabic for 'town' or 'settlement' (المدينة).

== Geography ==
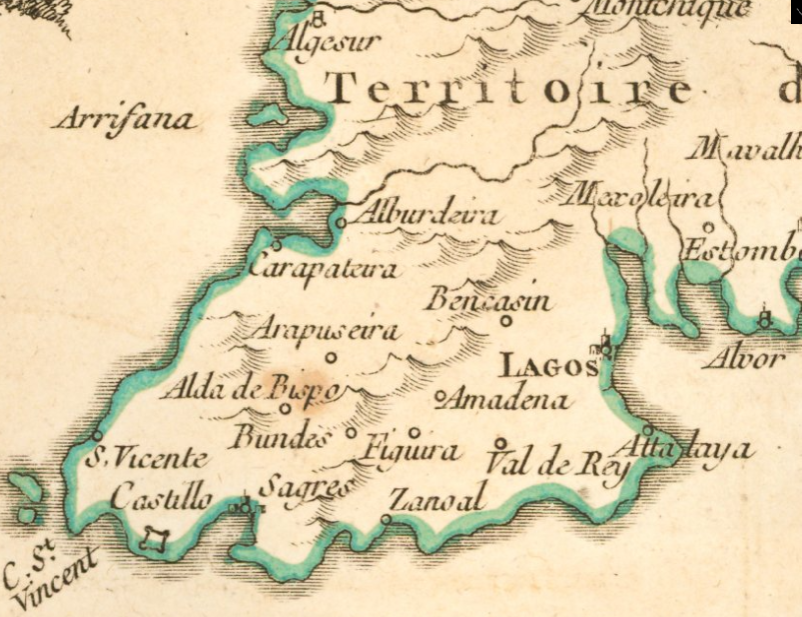
Detail of Vaugondy's 1751 map of Portugal showing Almadena to the west of Lagos

The village is located in the Vale de Barão. It lies 3 km north of the fishing village of Burgau and 4 km from Luz itself, just outside of the boundary of the Southwest Alentejo and Vicentine Coast Natural Park.

Almádena's location is on the edge of fertile sedimentary deposits including the 'ribeiras' of Almádena, of Burgau and of the Vale de Barão. Anecdotal evidence suggest that, in the past, the land was very fruitful and that Almádena's inhabitants were the richest in the freguesia of Luz but this may also be because they were also hard working.

Local farmers focused on fig cultivation rather than almonds, olives or carob beans, which were more ubiquitous to the east. However, one additional crop, rice, flourished and was consequently grown in the irrigable lowlands south west of the village.

While the agricultural landscape of the area around Almádena is fairly typical of the Algarve (olive/fig/carob/vine cultivation), a couple of miles to the west, over the next hill, its character starts to change. The writer, Raul Brandão, poetically and somewhat accurately described the abrupt change in landscape west of Almádena towards Budens and Vila de Bispo during a trip in August 1922:

″Then I cross the road leading to Luz, and soon, moving onwards past Almádena, the land's character changes. The Algarve is strange. Suddenly, it stops feeling cheerful and it becomes covered with scrub and stones. This worries me: for this is where the road through the sacred lands begins. The desolate hill behind the plain blackens. Even the houses are dark. The earth throws up gnawed pebbles, and from Budens on, the desolation redoubles. Not a fig tree, not an almond tree. Just slate-coloured rocks and rosemary. And this uniformity is reflected on this deserted road by the undulating hills around Vila do Bispo, which are dotted with abandoned windmills. Grey, sticky vegetation, whose leaves shine like glass – the rosemary leaf, which from this dryness extracts the moisture of tears. A few more steps and, as evening comes, this feeling becomes oppressive. Not because of what it is. But because it feels like nothingness. It's now an empty greyness.″ '

Some sources state that Almádena's location was originally on the sea at Boca do Rio, with the villagers resorting to the present inland site out of fear after the 1755 earthquake and its associated tidal wave. However, cartographic evidence dating from before 1755 suggests that village's location before this event was unchanged from its present location

== Buildings ==
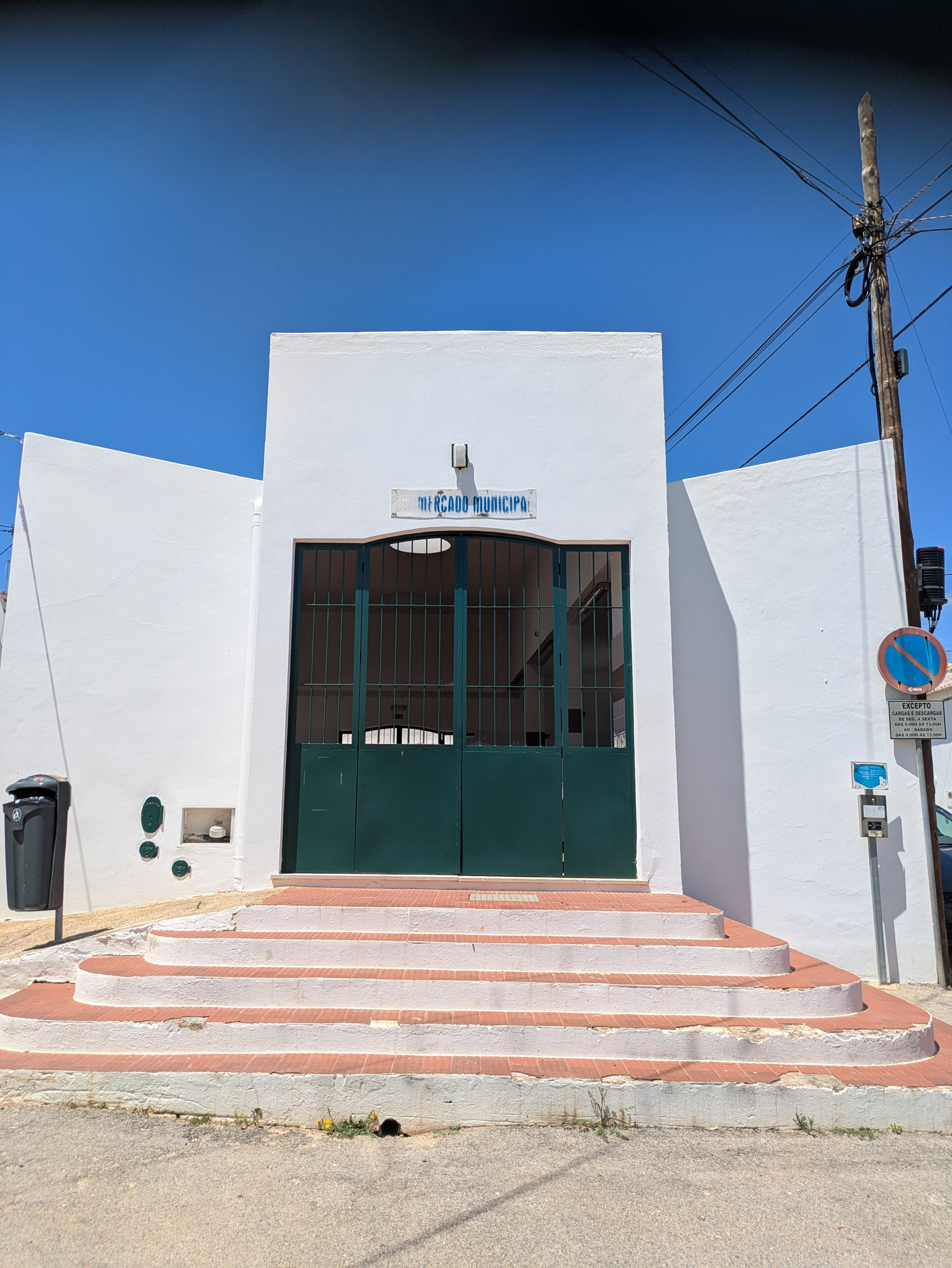
The village market building in Almadena, Lagos, Portugal

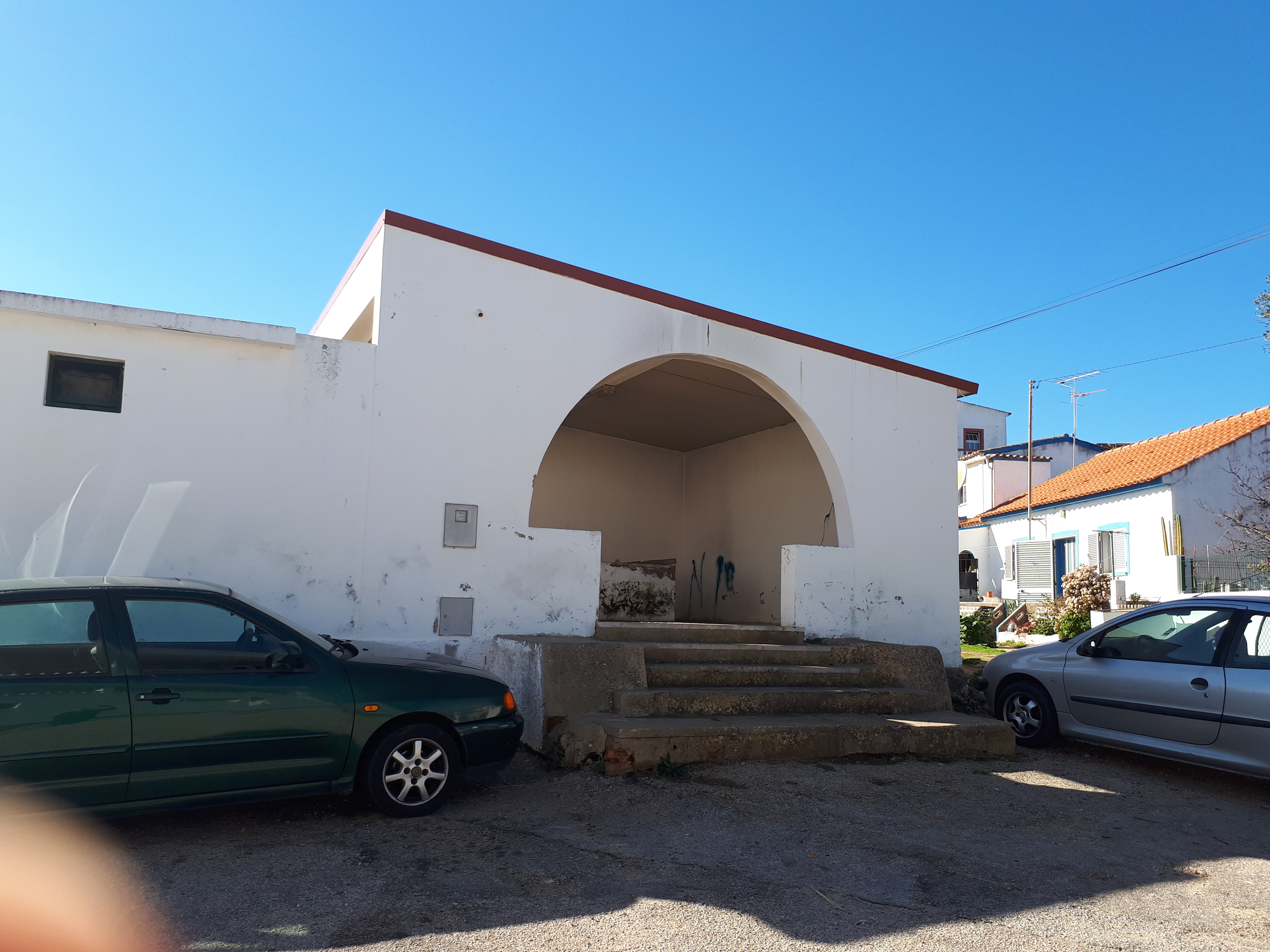
The public wash house in Almádena

Almádena resembles many rural villages in the Algarve. Its housing stock mainly consists of small white houses with traditional chimneys, a domestic architectural style influenced by the Moorish occupation of the area up to the thirteenth century. There is a small market for farmers' produce and a community centre in the heart of the village as well as several bars and restaurants. The main square in the village (Largo do Poço), unusually, has as its centre-piece a traditional farm well with a small fountain in the middle.

The village has a small chapel (salão paroquial) dedicated to St Gerard Majella (São Gerardo Majella), who is also the patron saint of mothers, motherhood and the falsely accused. Although a dependent chapel of its mother church of Nossa Senhora da Luz, São Gerardo's enjoys regular, weekly service and has a two-day annual celebration (festas) in late July, which includes a procession, a mass and other events.

Nearby buildings of interest include Quinta das Alagoas: A fourteenth century fortified farmhouse and known locally as the "Roman Farm", now converted into holiday accommodation. Some brickwork found on the site suggests that its origins could indeed go back as far as Roman times.

=== The Almadrava de Almádena ===
Historically, the economy of the inland village was closely tied to the coast through a lucrative seasonal bluefin tuna fishing concession known as the Armação (or Almadrava) de Almádena. Operating off nearby Boca do Rio beach, this multi-boat enterprise was funded and staffed by prominent agricultural families based in Almádena village. Intense raids by North African Barbary pirates targeting the valuable fixed nets led to a security crisis along the shoreline in 1631. In response, a royal decree by King Philip III prompted the Governor and Captain-General of the Algarve, D. Luís de Sousa, to construct the Fort of Almádena (Forte de São Luís de Almádena) in 1632 on the overlooking clifftops to explicitly defend the fishery. The concession was later integrated into the state-chartered monopoly, the Companhia Geral das Pescas do Reino do Algarve, in 1773, before shifting migratory patterns and modernised deep-sea fishing practices rendered the fixed coastal trap obsolete, leading to its eventual abandonment alongside the fort by 1861.

The presence of the Forte de Almádena at Boca do Rio has led to the false topynymic legend (lenda toponímica) among many locals that the village was originally located here near the fort. However, as the evidence from the 1751 Vaugondy map shows (see above) this legend is false.
