= Bensafrim e Barão de São João =

- Civil parish
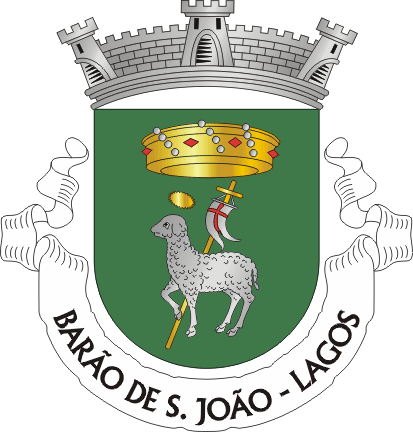
- Coat of arms
- Interactive map of Bensafrim e Barão de São João
- Country: Portugal
- Region: Algarve
- Intermunic. comm.: Algarve
- District: Faro
- Municipality: Lagos

Area
  - Total: 130.20 km^{2} (50.27 sq mi)

Population (2011)
  - Total: 2,444
  - Density: 18.77/km^{2} (48.62/sq mi)
- Time zone: UTC+00:00 (WET)
  - Summer (DST): UTC+01:00 (WEST)
- Website: https://www.ufbensafrimbaraosjoao.pt/

Bensafrim e Barão de São João is a civil parish in the municipality of Lagos, Portugal. It was formed in 2013 by the merger of the former parishes Bensafrim and Barão de São João. The population in 2011 was 2,425, in an area of 130.20 km^{2}.

== Bensafrim ==
Bensafrim is the biggest town of the Parish, with an estimated population of around 953 in 2021. Bensafrim is known for some of its old Roman sites, such as the Fonte Velha and Salmones da Mina, and the Bravura dam

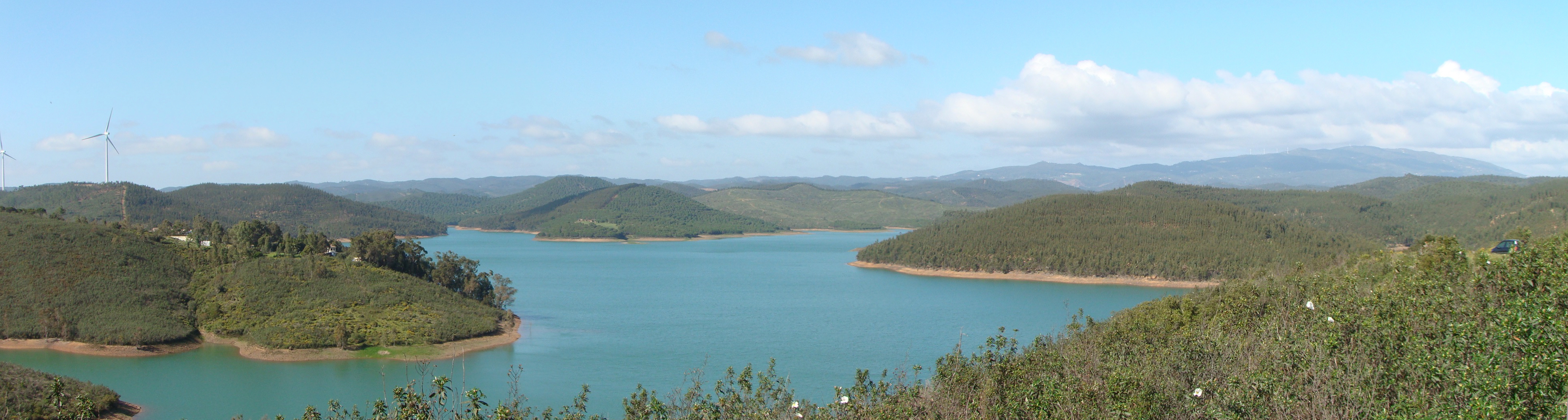
The Bravura Dam

=== History ===
Roman presence in the town can be traced back to the 1st century BC. This is due to some Menhirs and Necropolis, and other shards and nails archaeologists have discovered in the area.

=== Economy and Authority ===
Around the 16th century, the town's industry was based on typical local productions, such as almonds, cattle, coal, and ceramics. Most of these have survived to this day, thanks to the fact that Bensafrim remained a mostly undeveloped and rural town until the late 20th century. The authority at that time was mostly limited to the church and priest, that mostly presided over the community. If there were any problems in the community, they would usually revolve around or be solved by the town's church.

=== Etymology ===
While its Roman name was unknown, the current name comes from Bensafrim's Arab occupation. The most common name for the town at the time was Benassaharim, which according to Frei João de Sousa, meant "Sorcerer". According to more recent studies, the word name breaks down to "Ben Sab´r In", which can be related to “Bem Saber Inscrever”, which refers to the existence of a lapidary workshop, where gemstones would be carved into “monumental funerary stars”.

== Barão de São João ==
Barão de São João is the second biggest settlement in the Civil Parish, with an estimated population of around 380 in 2021. While the village might not be as big or have as much history as Bensafrim, but certainly does hold more touristic and geographical value.

=== Famous Locations ===
==== Igreja de São João Baptista ====
This church was centred around Saint John the Baptist, which was a temple from the 17th century, rebuilt in 1951. The church features an abstract statue of Jesus on a Cross outside the church, made by Deodato Inácio Santos.

==== Mata Nacional ====
The Mata is a forest, made up of mostly pine, eucalyptus, acacia, and cork trees. There are multiple hiking paths available to the public, as well as a park, picnic tables and benches, and grills. The forest is known for having exposed quartz pebbles on the surface, and multiple unpaved driving paths going through the forest.

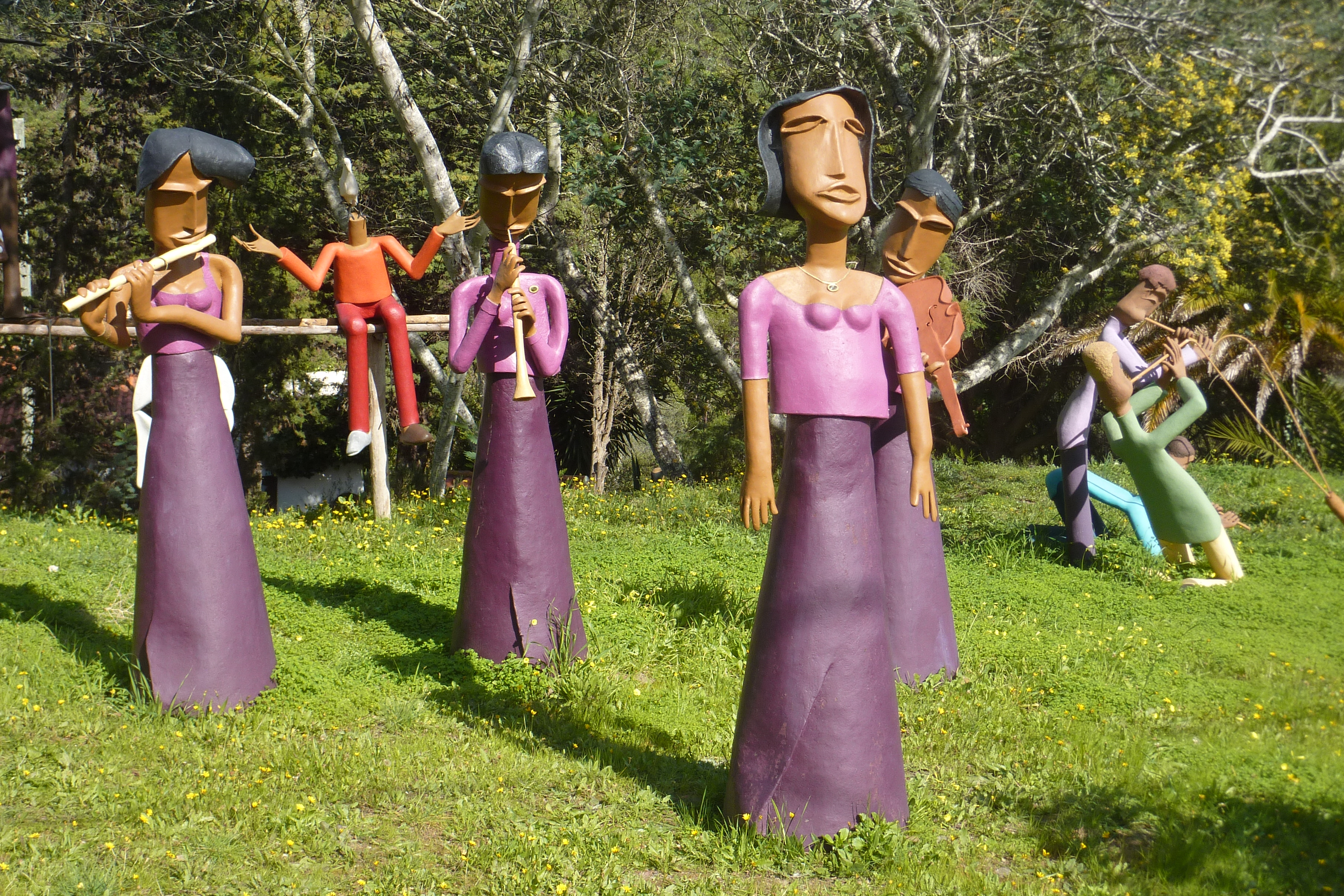
Picture of some of the sculptures

==== Sculptures ====
Next to a rural road leading out of the Barão de São João, are a collection of figurative sculptures. They were created by Deodato Inácio Santos, a man who was born near Lagos in 1939. He learnt how to mold clay in Escola Industrial e Comercial de Lagos from his teacher, António da Luz, and was taught carpentry by Américo Guerreiro dos Santos. He was encouraged by famous singer Zeca Afonso to write articles to several local newspapers and magazines, which brought them more popularity.

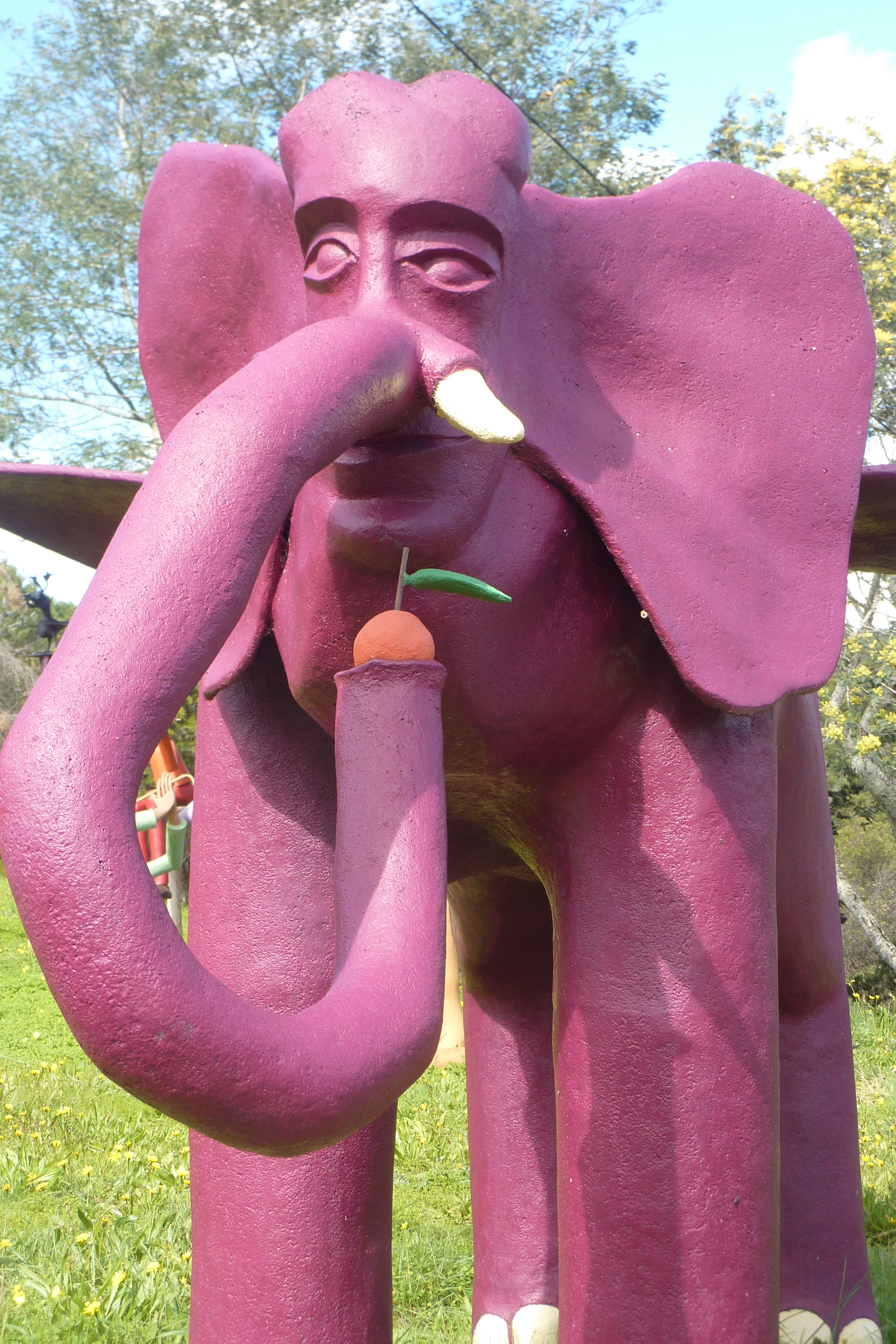

Opposite the statues on the other side of the road, is where he is said to live. Deodato Inácio Santos is also known for his lesser-known work in the Forest, where he has carved faces into the stones along the path, which is a part of the larger "Walk of Poets", a more recent creation from 2021. Santos has carved poetry and quotes into rock faces along one of the paths going through the forest.
