= Modesta (disambiguation) =

Modesta is a 1956 film set in Puerto Rico.

Modesta may also refer to:

== Surname ==
- Viktoria Modesta (born 1988), Latvian–British singer and performance artist
- Wilman Modesta (born 1995), Dominican footballer

== Given name ==
- Modesta Avila (c.1867–1891), protester, first woman felon in Orange County, California
- Modesta Cefai (disappeared 1911), missing Maltese girl
- Moderata Fonte (1555–1592), Venetian writer and poet
- Modesta Justė Morauskaitė (born 1995), Lithuanian sprinter and snowboarder
- Modesta Bor (1926–1998), Venezuelan composer
- Modesta Uka (born 1999), Kosovar footballer
- Modesta Sanginés Uriarte (1832–1887), Bolivian composer
- Modesta Lavana (1929–2010), Nahua healer from Morelos, Mexico
- Modesta Vžesniauskaitė (born 1983), Lithuanian cyclist
