= Fortunate Son (disambiguation) =

"Fortunate Son" is a 1969 song by Creedence Clearwater Revival.

Fortunate Son may also refer:

== Film and television ==
- Fortunate Son (film), a 2011 autobiographical documentary by Canadian director Tony Asimakopoulos
- "Fortunate Son" (The Sopranos), a 2001 TV episode
- "Fortunate Son" (Star Trek: Enterprise), a 2001 TV episode
- Fortunate Son (TV series), a 2020 Canadian drama

== Literature ==
- Fortunate Son (Hatfield book), a 2000 biography of George W. Bush by J. H. Hatfield
- Fortunate Son (novel), a 2006 novel by Walter Mosley
- Fortunate Son, a 1991 autobiography by Lewis Burwell Puller Jr.
- Fortunate Son: A Novel of the Greatest Trial in Irish History, a 2014 novel by David Marlett recounting the life of James Annesley

== See also ==
- "Unfortunate Son", an episode of TV series King of the Hill season 6
- "The Unfortunate Son", a posthumous story by Alejandro Carrascosa
