= Disappearance of Isabella Skelton =

1969 disappearance in Manchester

Isabella Skelton
- Born: 21 January 1934; Glasgow, Scotland
- Disappeared: 5 June 1969 (aged 35); Crumpsall, England
- Status: Missing for 57 years, 5 months and 4 days
- Spouse: Lewis Skelton (m. 1952)

On 5 June 1969, Isabella Skelton, a 35‑year‑old woman living in the Crumpsall area of Manchester, disappeared from her home. No confirmed sightings or official records of her have emerged since. Her family reported her missing in 2019, leading to a police investigation. Greater Manchester Police later confirmed that they were treating the case as a murder investigation, and her disappearance was featured on BBC Crimewatch in 2024.

== Background ==
Isabella McDowall was born on 21 January 1934 in Glasgow, Scotland. She was petite, had black wavy hair, and dressed in a neat, classic style; she was also known as "Izzy". In 1952, McDowall married Lewis Skelton. The couple later moved to Greater Manchester, living first in Salford before settling in the Crumpsall area. They had three children. During the 1960s, she worked as a typist for several local employers, including Atlas Express, Gallagher Cigarettes, and Ball Bearings Services, where she was employed at the time of her disappearance.

== Disappearance and aftermath ==
On 5 June 1969, Skelton was last seen at her home in the Crumpsall area of Manchester. Her disappearance occurred two weeks before her daughter's fifteenth birthday, while one of her two sons was in hospital with a broken leg. According to her daughter, their father told the children that Skelton had "gone away for work", offering no further explanation, and they did not see their mother again.

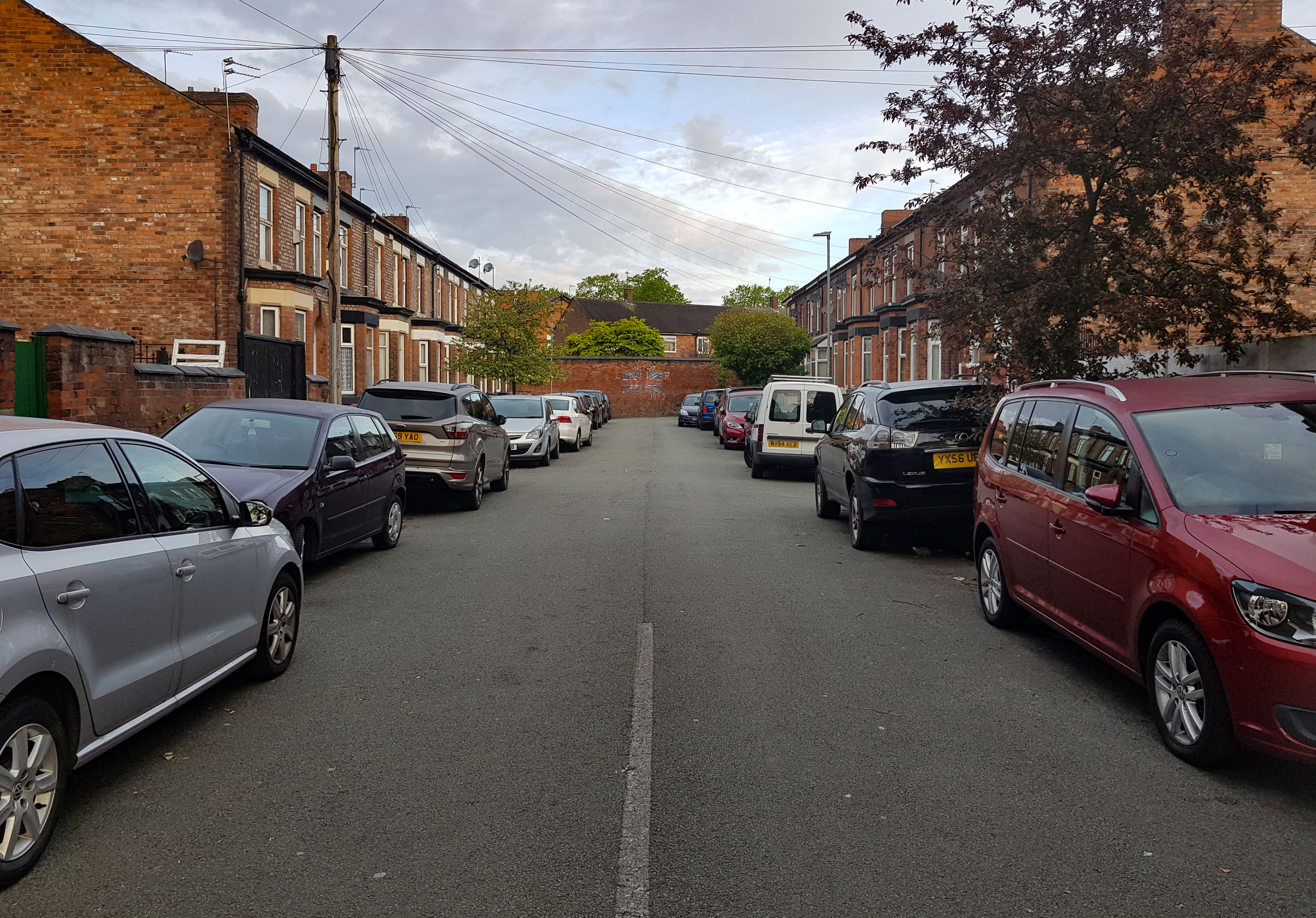
Lidiard Street, Crumpsall, Manchester

Skelton's daughter married in the early 1970s and began searching for her mother following the birth of her second child in 1975. She and her husband travelled to Scotland to check the electoral roll and went through every McDowall listed in the telephone directory, attempting to trace relatives who might have known her whereabouts. She also undertook genealogical research, but no information about her mother emerged. Skelton's daughter said that her father did not speak about her mother's disappearance and that it became a "taboo subject". She later became estranged from him.

There has been no record of Skelton claiming her pension or receiving medical care, and no confirmed sightings of her have been reported since 1969. She was also absent from her brother's wedding.

In 2019, Skelton was reported missing by her family. A police investigation followed, and in October 2020, a man was interviewed under caution on suspicion of her murder, but no charges were brought. In 2021, officers carried out excavation work at the home she lived in when she disappeared, but no human remains were found.

Greater Manchester Police confirmed in 2023 that they were treating Skelton's disappearance as a murder investigation. Her case was featured on BBC Crimewatch in 2024.

== See also ==
- List of people who disappeared mysteriously: 1910–1970
