= Disappearance of Adele Marie Wells =

Unsolved 1958 disappearance in Flint, Michigan, U.S.

Adele Marie Wells
- Born: January 1, 1951
- Disappeared: November 21, 1958 (aged 7); Flint, Michigan, U.S.
- Status: Missing for 67 years and 11 months
- Height: 3 ft 6 in (1.07 m)

Adele Marie Wells (January 1, 1951 – disappeared November 21, 1958) is an American missing person who disappeared in Flint, Michigan, on November 21, 1958, when she was seven years old. Although she is believed to have been abducted, no suspects have ever been identified in connection with her disappearance, and her fate and whereabouts remain unknown.

== Background ==
Adele Marie Wells was born on January 1, 1951. She was part of a family of nine. Her father, Karl W. Wells, worked at a factory in Flint, Michigan.

At the time of her disappearance, Wells was seven years old and attending the second grade at Jefferson Elementary School. She lived with her parents, three sisters, and three brothers.

Wells was African American.

== Disappearance ==
On the morning of November 21, 1958, Wells stayed home from school due to having a slight cold. Later that morning, Wells walked to her grandmother's house, located one block from her house and four blocks from her school; Wells had wanted to show her grandmother how her mother had styled her hair for school.

Wells was last seen leaving her grandmother's residence at 11:30 a.m. She neither returned home nor arrived at school, and has never been seen or heard from since.

At the time of her disappearance, Wells was wearing a gray cotton coat, a blue dress with small animal figures along the hemline, red knee-length socks, and black shoes. She wore her hair in bangs with waves on the sides.

Wells's mother did not become concerned until later in the afternoon, as she had assumed that Wells was feeling better and had decided to finish the remainder of the school day after leaving her grandmother's house. Police were notified of Wells's disappearance at 5:00 p.m.

== Investigation and developments ==
More than 1,000 people searched for Wells on November 23, two days after her disappearance.

Police reported having received numerous reliable witness reports of a young light-skinned African-American man carrying a young girl around Wells's age toward a dirty black Chevrolet with a damaged front fender on Lewis Street near Gilkey Creek. The man was purportedly wearing a gray coat and red socks. Children who attended Wells's school reported that a man who matched the description received by police had attempted to lure them into his vehicle in the days preceding Wells's disappearance. The man reported to police was never identified.

One witness claimed to have seen Wells enter a car with two men near her school, while one of Wells's classmates claimed to have seen a man beating a little girl in the woods near the school. Neither of these accounts could be verified.

Police discounted earlier, conflicting reports from Wells's playmates, who claimed to have witnessed a man force Wells into a late model pink and white car with large tailfins near her home on the day of her disappearance.

In September 2014, the National Center for Missing & Exploited Children released an age progression photo depicting Wells at the age of 63.

Wells's case remains unsolved and is classified as a non-familial abduction.

== Aftermath ==
Following Wells's disappearance, her parents had another child, though they subsequently divorced. Wells's mother, Martha Wells, was given custody of the children, though they were placed in foster care due to her poor health. Martha died in 1987.

In 1992, Karl Wells shot one of Adele's brothers and was charged with assault with intent to commit murder, along with several counts of felonious assault. Since Adele's brother did not want their father to be imprisoned, Karl pleaded no contest to a reduced charge of misdemeanor aggravated assault, for which he was placed on probation.

== See also ==
- List of people who disappeared mysteriously: 1910–1990
