= Erich Akt =

German Nazi Party official (1898–1961)

Training Manager Gau Berlin
- In office 1934 – 8 May 1945
- Leader: Joseph Goebbels
- Succeeded by: Position abolished

Reichstag Deputy
- In office 10 April 1938 – 8 May 1945

Berlin City Councilor
- In office 1935–1938

Personal details
- Born: 3 July 1898 Krotoschin, Province of Posen, Kingdom of Prussia, German Empire
- Died: missing 1945; declared dead 4 July 1961
- Citizenship: German
- Party: Nazi Party
- Occupation: Bank clerk
- Civilian awards: Golden Party Badge

Military service
- Allegiance: German Empire; Nazi Germany
- Branch/service: Imperial German Army; Wehrmacht
- Years of service: 1914–1918; 1941–1943
- Battles/wars: World War I World War II
- Military awards: Iron Cross, 1st and 2nd class

Erich Akt (3 July 1898 – missing 1945; declared dead 4 July 1961) was a German Nazi Party official in Gau Berlin and an SA-Oberführer in the Sturmabteilung. From 1938 to 1945 he was a member of the Reichstag. Officially listed as missing at the end of World War II in Europe, he was legally declared dead in 1961.

== Early life ==
Akt was born in Krotoschin (today, Krotoszyn) in the Prussian province of Posen. After attending Volksschule and Realschule, he volunteered for service with the Imperial German Army in the First World War. Akt served from 1914 to 1918 on both the eastern and western fronts. He was wounded twice and was awarded the Iron Cross 1st and 2nd class. After the war, Akt earned his living as an entry-level administrative assistant at the Königsberg Landratsamt (district administrative office) then becoming a bookkeeper and a bank clerk in Berlin from 1920 to 1934.

== Nazi Party career ==
On 1 November 1929, Akt became a member of the Nazi Party (membership number 160,354). From November 1930 to 1932, he was deputy section leader in the Andreasplatz neighborhood of Berlin. In 1932, he became a district training manager for the Friedrichsfelde district and, in 1933, he joined the Gauleitung (Gau leadership) under Gauleiter Joseph Goebbels as deputy head of staff of the Gau Berlin organizational department. In 1934, he advanced to Gauausbildungsleiter (Gau training manager), a post he would occupy through 1945. In 1936, he was appointed Gau Inspector (East) and, in 1938, Gau Inspector III. Akt was also active in the city government, working at the Berlin city council from 1933 to 1934, and serving as a city councilor for the Prenzlauer Berg district from 1935 to 1938.

From 10 April 1938 to the end of the Nazi regime in 1945, Akt was a deputy in the Reichstag for electoral constituency 3 (Berlin-East). During the Second World War, he performed military service from 1941 to 1943. In 1944, he was made the head of the Special Air Protection Department in the Gau Berlin leadership and also was given responsibility for the cities of Vienna, Budapest and Bucharest in the Inter-ministerial Committee for the Relief of Air War Damage, which was headed by Goebbels. In the Nazi paramilitary organization, the Sturmabteilung (SA), Akt was promoted to SA-Oberführer on 20 April 1944. After the end of the war, Akt was officially reported missing. In 1961, he was declared dead by the Prenzlauer Berg District Court with effect from 4 July 1961.

== See also ==
- List of people who disappeared mysteriously: 1910–1990

== Sources ==
- Joachim Lilla, Martin Döring, Andreas Schulz: Statisten in Uniform. Die Mitglieder des Reichstags 1933–1945. Ein biographisches Handbuch. Unter Einbeziehung der völkischen und nationalsozialistischen Reichstagsabgeordneten ab Mai 1924. Droste, Düsseldorf 2004, ISBN 3-7700-5254-4.
- Miller, Michael D.; Schulz, Andreas (2012). Gauleiter: The Regional Leaders of the Nazi Party and Their Deputies, 1925–1945. Vol. 1 (Herbert Albrecht – H. Wilhelm Hüttmann). R. James Bender Publishing. ISBN 978-1-932-97021-0.
- Anja Stanciu: "Alte Kämpfer" der NSDAP: Eine Berliner Funktionselite 1926–1949 p. 449 ISBN 978-3-412-51008-4
- Stockhorst, Erich (1985). 5000 Köpfe: Wer War Was im 3. Reich. Arndt. ISBN 978-3-887-41116-9.
