= Karla Mayer =

Nazi Concentration camp guard

- Born: Karla Woellert; 7 February 1918; Friedland, Germany
- Disappeared: 1944

Karla Mayer, born Karla Woellert (born 7 February 1918), was a guard at three Nazi death camps during the Second World War. Mayer's whereabouts after 1944 are unknown.

== Background ==
Woellert was born in Friedland, Germany. On 15 September 1941, she arrived at Ravensbrück to undergo guard training. In March 1942, she arrived at Auschwitz I camp in Poland. There she gained the title of Leiterin eines Sortierkommandos ("Chief Overseer of a Sorting Party").

== Disappearance ==
Mayer later went to the Majdanek camp near Lublin, and when Majdanek was evacuated in early 1944, she arrived back at Auschwitz, and then disappeared. Her fate is unknown.

== See also ==
- List of people who disappeared
