= Charles Shelton =

United States Air Force officer (1932–1965)

- Born: April 29, 1932; Utica, Kentucky, U.S.
- Died: Presumably after April 29, 1965; Laos
- Military career
- Allegiance: United States
- Branch: United States Air Force
- Rank: Colonel
- Conflicts: Vietnam War

Charles E. Shelton (April 29, 1932 – after April 29, 1965) was a United States Air Force officer who was shot down during the Vietnam War over Laos during a reconnaissance mission on April 29, 1965, his 33rd birthday. His fate is unknown and he was classified as a prisoner of war until 1994, making him the last official U.S. prisoner of war from the Vietnam War.

After his plane was shot down, Shelton sent a radio report that he had escaped by parachute. A helicopter was dispatched to retrieve him, but was unable to reach him due to poor visibility. Six days after his capture, his wife was informed that villagers said he had been captured by Laotian communist forces. He is believed to have been held as a prisoner of war and his family was told stories of his courage while imprisoned, but he was never released or accounted for. His wife, Marian Shelton, sought to find him and became an active participant in the POW-MIA movement. In October 1990 she committed suicide by gunshot, apparently due to frustration and despair over her inability to find him.

In September 1994, the Air Force reclassified him as killed in action upon the request of his children and after a search of the area where he was captured failed to yield evidence that he might still be alive.

At the time of his downing, Shelton held the rank of captain; between then and the time he was declared to be killed in action, he was promoted to the rank of colonel. Shelton was honored at a ceremony at Arlington National Cemetery attended by dignitaries including General Merrill McPeak, Chief of Staff of the Air Force.

== See also ==
- List of people who disappeared mysteriously: 1910–1990
