= Disappearance of Steven Damman =

Unsolved 1955 disappearance of American boy

Steven Damman
- Born: Steven Craig Damman; December 15, 1952; Kalkaska, Michigan, U.S.
- Disappeared: October 31, 1955 (aged 2); Long Island, New York, U.S.
- Status: Missing for 70 years, 11 months and 16 days

Steven Craig Damman (born December 15, 1952) the son of Jerry and Marilyn Damman, disappeared along with his sister Pamela on October 31, 1955, while he was left in a stroller in front of a bakery on Long Island, New York, United States. His sister was found unharmed a few yards from the shop. He was two years old at the time of his disappearance. Authorities believe Damman was kidnapped.

Damman's family received multiple different ransom notes, including one in late November 1955 demanding $3,000 ($36,100 modern equivalent), then $10,000 ($120,000), then $14,000 ($168,300) for his return, though they were dismissed by police as hoaxes or "cruel pranks". The ransom letters sent in late November turned out to be a Queens College student who had nothing to do with Damman's disappearance.

In 2009, John Barnes of Michigan came forward, suspecting that he may have been Damman.

== John Barnes ==
In 2009, John Barnes, of Kalkaska, Michigan, who suspected that he was Steven Damman, underwent DNA testing. On Thursday, June 18, 2009, FBI Special Agent Andrew Arena released a statement saying that "DNA samples analysed by the FBI laboratory in Quantico, Virginia, show John Barnes and Pamela Damman Horne, Steven Damman's sister, do not share the same mother." Damman is still missing.

== See also ==
- List of people who disappeared
