= Rita Gorgonowa =

Polish murderer

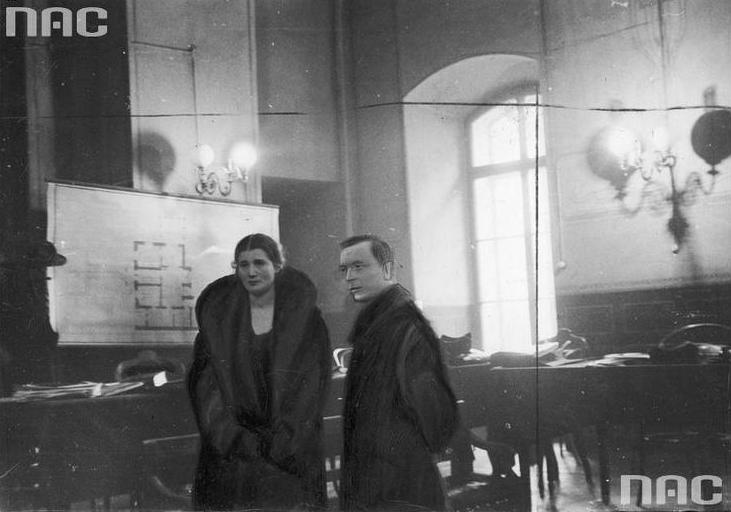
- Gorgonowa with her attorney, Mieczysław Ettinger, during the trial in 1933
- Born: Emilia Margerita Gorgon; 7 March 1901; Knin, Dalmatia, Austria-Hungary
- Died: after 3 September 1939
- Occupation: Governess
- Known for: Defendant in a murder trial

Rita Gorgonowa (real name Emilia Margerita Gorgon, née Ilic; 7 March 1901 – after 3 September 1939) was a governess, and main character of one of the most infamous crime stories of the Second Polish Republic. She was found guilty of murder of Elżbieta Zaremba, daughter of Henryk Zaremba, an architect from Lwów. The murder, which took place on 30 December 1931, and the subsequent trial, were regarded as the biggest crime story of Poland at that time. Gorgonowa, who had a son and two daughters, died in unknown circumstances: her post-1939 fate has not been established.

== Early life ==
Emilia Margerita Ilic was born on 7 March 1901 in Knin, Dalmatia, Austria-Hungary. She was either of Serbian or Croatian origin. Her father was a physician, who died when she was three. Her mother later remarried.

At the age of 15, Margerita married a Colonel of the Austro-Hungarian Army, Erwin Gorgon. Probably in 1918 she gave birth to a son and settled in Lwów with her husband's family. In 1921, Erwin Gorgon left Poland and, in search of work, emigrated to the United States. Soon afterwards, Rita was forced by her in-laws to leave their house, as they had wrongly accused her of immoral behaviour. Gorgonowa, who was regarded as a very attractive woman, left her son with the in-laws and supported herself by working as a governess.

== Working with the Zaremba family ==
In 1924, Gorgonowa became a governess at the house of the 41-year-old architect Henryk Zaremba. She lived at his villa in Brzuchowice, located 7 kilometers from Lwów. Prior to employing Gorgonowa, Zaremba had separated from his wife, who had been confined to an asylum as she suffered from mental problems. Zaremba and his ex-wife had two children: a daughter, Elżbieta (Lusia), born in 1914 and a son, Stanislaw, born 1917.

In addition to her governess duties, Gorgonowa ran the house. After about a year, Gorgonowa and Zaremba began an affair, which eventually let to daughter Romana's birth in 1928. Gorgonowa later claimed that she was hoping to marry the wealthy architect. Meanwhile, the close relationship between her father and her governess was noticed by teenage Lusia, who often argued about this with her father.

== Murder ==
In the night of 30–31 December 1931, Elżbieta (Lusia), who was sleeping in her bed, was hit in the head by a blunt object and died on the spot. The murder was discovered by Stanislaw Zaremba, who was awakened by a dog, and alarmed residents of the house. Doctor Ludwik Csala was called for, together with a police officer, who scanned the room.

Since circumstantial evidence pointed at Gorgonowa, she was immediately arrested. Also, Henryk Zaremba, suspected of cooperation with murderers, was held in custody for six weeks. Furthermore, police detectives interviewed a gardener and a teenage boy from Brzuchowice, who was secretly in love with Lusia.

During the interrogation, Gorgonowa maintained her innocence. Police specialists came to the conclusion, that the murder had been carried out by a resident of the house, as there were no footsteps on the windowsill and in the snow around the building. Furthermore, no traces of a break-in were found, and family dog Lux did not bark that night. According to official police report, Gorgonowa crossed the corridor from her room to Lusia's room, killing the girl. She then opened the window, and penetrated her victim's vagina with a finger, trying to make it appear as a rape. Upon leaving Lusia's room, Gorgonowa noticed Lux the dog, whom she hit in the head. The canine wailed, waking Stas Zaremba, who was sleeping in the dining room. The boy entered the corridor, noticing a person dressed in a sheepskin, standing next to a Christmas tree. Stas later claimed that it was Rita.

Unable to get back to her bedroom, Gorgonowa ran out through front door. While entering her bedroom, she broke a small window, cutting her finger. She then changed her nightdress and joined other residents of the house, who had been alarmed by Stas. On 31 December Gorgonowa threw the ice pick into a pool, losing a candle. Later on, a bloodstained handkerchief was found, also traces of blood were found on Rita's sheepskin. The blood on the handkerchief and the sheepskin was type A, while Gorgonowa's blood was type 0. Nevertheless, findings of police experts were undermined by scientist from Lwów, Ludwik Hirszfeld.

== Trial ==
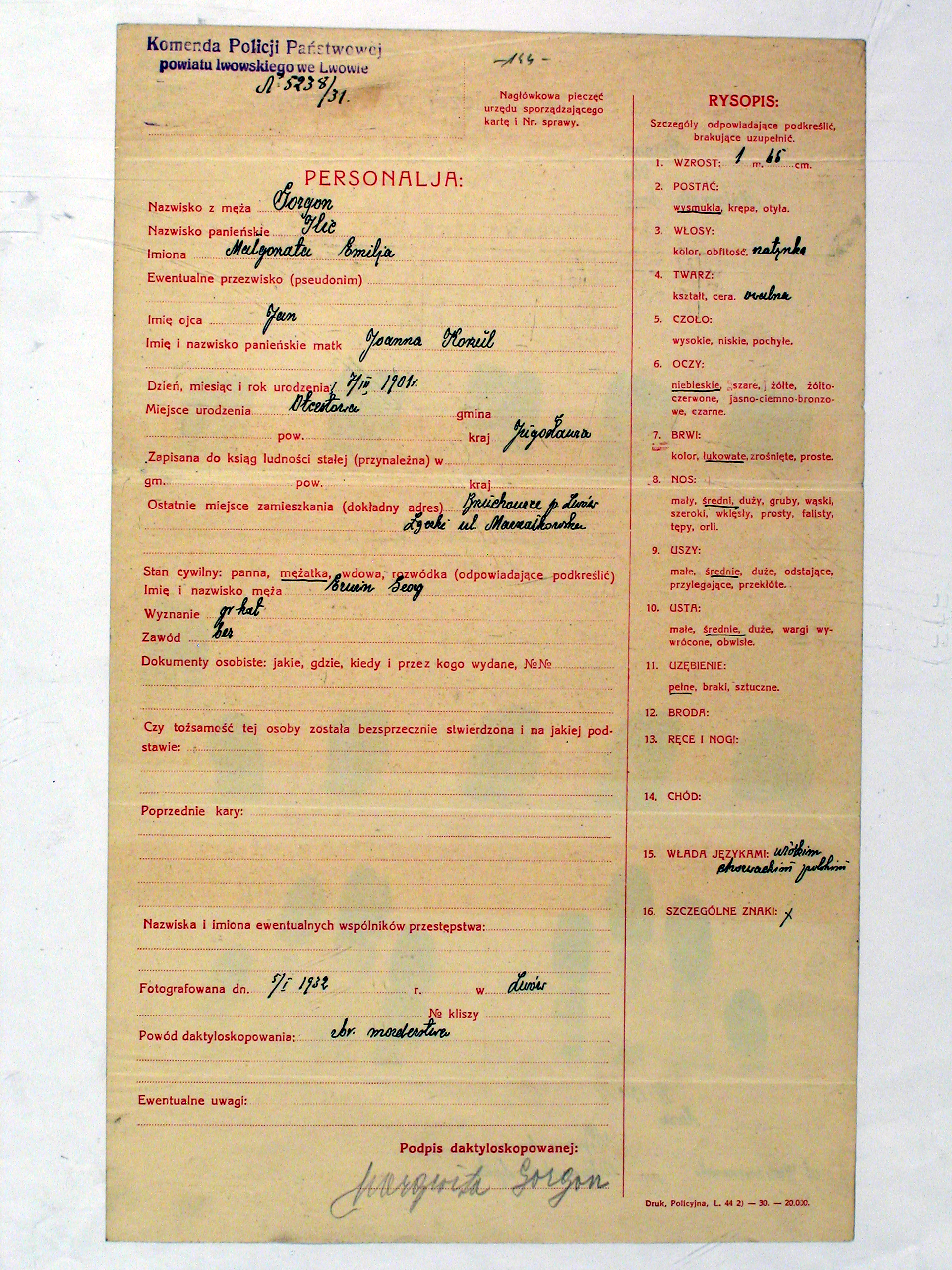
Gorgonowa's aAccused person's record card

On 14 May 1932, after a short trial, District Court at Lwów sentenced Rita Gorgonowa to death. Due to a number of legal mistakes and appeals of her defence (Mieczyslaw Ettinger of Warsaw, Jozef Wozniakowski of Kraków and Maurycy Axer of Lwów), the verdict was later changed by the Supreme Court. While in prison, Margerita gave birth to daughter Ewa, on 20 September 1932. In the meantime her case was moved to the District Court in Kraków, which on 29 April 1933 sentenced Rita to eight years. Gorgonowa was to be released on 24 May 1940, but due to the German Invasion of Poland she was released under an amnesty on 3 September 1939.

Further fate of Rita Gorgonowa is unknown. Her daughters claim that she survived World War II. According to some sources, she moved to Silesia or ran a newsstand in Opole. Other sources claim that she left Poland and settled in South America.

== In popular culture ==
In 1977, a feature film The Case of Gorgonowa was made by director Janusz Majewski, with Ewa Dalkowska playing the role of Rita. In 2014 Rita's daughter Ewa and granddaughter Margarita Ilic-Lisowska declared their intention to re-open the trial and change of the verdict.

== See also ==
- List of people who disappeared mysteriously: 1910–1990
- List of unsolved deaths

== Sources ==
- Edmund Żurek: "Gorgonowa i inni", KiW, Warszawa 1973
- Stanisław Milewski "Ciemne sprawy międzywojnia", Wydawnictwo Iskry : Warszawa, 2002 / rec. Józef Gurgul - Problemy kryminalistyki 250/2005
