= Antoine Cordonnier =

French flying ace

- Born: 17 January 1892; Roubaix, France
- Died: 28 July 1918 (aged 26) (missing in action)
- Military career
- Allegiance: France
- Branch: Aviation
- Service years: 1914–1918
- Rank: Sous lieutenant
- Units: Escadrille 57, Escadrille 15
- Awards: Chevalier of Legion d'honneur, Croix de Guerre with seven Palmes

Sous lieutenant Antoine Cordonnier (17 January 1892 – 28 July 1918) was a French flying ace during World War I. He was credited with five aerial victories.

== Early life ==
Antoine Cordonnier was born on 17 January 1892 in Roubaix, France.

== World War I ==
Cordonnier was mobilized for military duty in the early days of World War I, on 21 August 1914. He served initially as a combat engineer in the 3eme Regiment de Genie. However, on 29 February 1916, he began pilot's training. On 8 August 1916, he was awarded Military Pilot's Certificate number 4190. He underwent advanced training at Dijon, Avord, and Châteauroux before being posted to Escadrille 57, a Nieuport squadron, on 18 February 1917. He scored his first aerial victory on 16 April 1917, destroying an enemy observation balloon to become a balloon buster. He was promoted to sergeant on 25 May 1917, and to adjutant on 1 October 1917.

On 2 January 1918, he was commissioned a sous lieutenant. Shortly thereafter, on 15 January 1918, he transferred to Escadrille 15, a SPAD squadron. He would score four more aerial victories while flying for this unit before going missing in action on 28 July 1918. By the time he disappeared, he had won the Croix de Guerre with seven Palmes. On 3 August 1918, he was made a Chevalier of the Legion d'honneur.

== See also ==
- List of people who disappeared
