= Emil Kauppi =

Finnish composer (1875–1930)

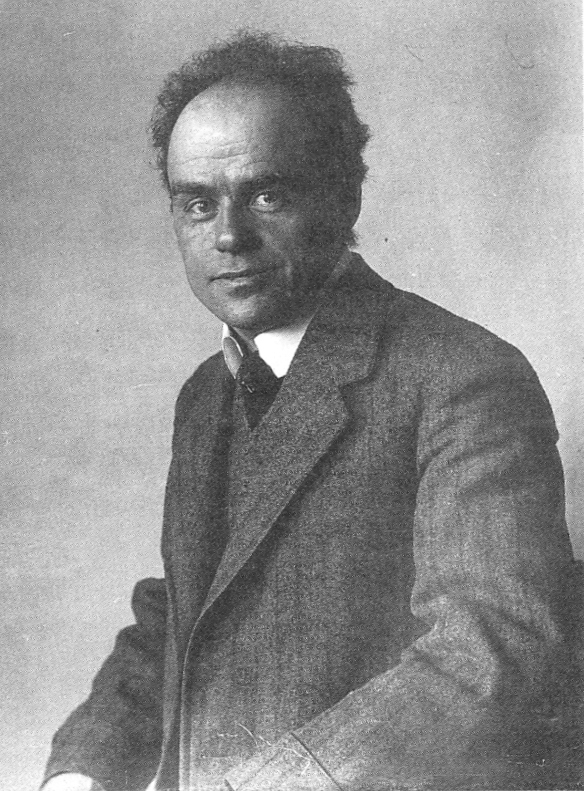
- Emil Kauppi
- Born: Johan Emil Kauppi; 28 October 1875; Finland
- Disappeared: October 1930 (aged 55–56)
- Died: Unknown

Johan Emil Kauppi (28 October 1875 – disappeared 1930) was a Finnish composer. His teachers included Jean Sibelius.

== Background ==
Kauppi married a woman named Liina Lovisa Lindström in 1908.

He wrote two operas. The first, in 1925, was Päiväkummun pidot (The Feast at Solhaug), which was well received by critics. The second, in 1930, was Nummisuutarit (The Cobblers on the Heath), which received only poor reviews.

In October 1930, shortly after the premiere of Nummisuutarit, he disappeared and is thought to have committed suicide. He was last seen alive in Tampere on 24 October.

== Compositions ==
- 2 operas
- 6 operettas
- incidental music
- 50 lieder
- 20 choral works
- 10 piano works
- chamber music

== See also ==
- List of people who disappeared
