= List of people who disappeared mysteriously (1910–1970) =

This is a list of people who disappeared mysteriously from 1910–1970 or whose deaths or exact circumstances thereof are not substantiated. Many people who disappear end up declared presumed dead and some of these people were possibly subjected to forced disappearance.

This list is a general catch-all; for specialty lists, see Lists of people who disappeared.

== 1910s ==
| Date | Person(s) | Age | Missing from | Circumstances | Refs. |
|---|---|---|---|---|---|
| 1910 | Burt Alvord | 42–43 | Central America | An American lawman-turned-outlaw, Alvord had been a Cochise County, Arizona, deputy, but had turned to crime—primarily train robbery—by the early 1900s. He was last seen in 1910 working as a Panama Canal employee. Alvord's ultimate fate is unknown. | |
| c. 12 July 1910 | Alexander Pfitzner | 29 | Marblehead, Massachusetts, U.S. | Hungarian-American engineer and aviation pioneer who designed and flew the first monoplane to be built in the United States. Reported as suicidal due to his lack of commercial success, Pfitzner is said to have died by suicide in Marblehead Harbor on 12 July 1910. His body was never found, and there were rumoured sightings of him in New York City in September. | |
| 12 December 1910 | Dorothy Arnold | 25 | New York City, New York, U.S. | Manhattan socialite and perfume heiress Dorothy Arnold vanished after buying a book in New York City. She intended to walk through Central Park, but was never seen again. | |
| 27 August 1911 | Modesta Cefai | 6 | Rabat, Gozo, Malta | Six-year-old Modesta Cefai disappeared from Rabat, Gozo, after she wandered out of her house. | |
| March 1912 | Sebastiano DiGaetano | ~50 | New York City, New York, U.S. | DiGaetano disappeared shortly after stepping down as boss of the Maranzano crime family. His wife and he are believed to have returned to Italy, but this theory is unconfirmed. | |
| 23 August 1912 | Bobby Dunbar | 4 | St. Landry Parish, Louisiana, U.S. | Bobby Dunbar disappeared during a fishing trip. A child found in the custody of William Cantwell Walters of Mississippi eight months later was ruled to be Bobby Dunbar by a court-appointed arbiter, and Walters was found guilty of kidnapping. The child grew up as Bobby Dunbar, had four children of his own, and died in 1966. In 2004, DNA tests proved that the child found was not related to Bobby's brother, Alonzo. | |
| December 1913 | Ambrose Bierce | 71 | Chihuahua, Mexico | The American writer known for An Occurrence at Owl Creek Bridge and The Devil's Dictionary was supposedly last heard from in a letter of December 1913 to his secretary and companion, Carrie Christiansen. Theories of his demise are plentiful; some claim that he perished in war-torn Mexico or perhaps was executed as a spy in the municipal cemetery of Sierra Mojada, Coahuila, where a gravestone bearing his name was erected in 2004. Professional American skeptic Joe Nickell, however, has concluded that Bierce deliberately misled the public about his destination, and that Bierce actually went to the Grand Canyon, where he died by suicide. | |
| 16 January 1914 | F. Lewis Clark | 52 | Santa Barbara, California, U.S. | Clark, a prominent industrialist from the U.S. state of Idaho, disappeared on a business trip to Santa Barbara, California. | |
| c. March 1914 | Alejandro Bello Silva | 24 | Chile | A lieutenant in the Chilean Army, Bello disappeared during a qualifying examination flight over central Chile. At some point during the flight, Bello became lost in the clouds and was never seen again. Although search efforts commenced within hours, neither he nor his aircraft was ever found. | |
| September 1914 | František Gellner | 33 | Zamość, Austrian Galicia, Austria-Hungary | The Czech poet, short-story writer, artist and anarchist was reported missing on 13 September 1914. | |
| 25 January 1915 | Arthur Lang | 24 | Cuinchy, France | The English first-class cricketer and serviceman of the Grenadier Guards was reported missing in action on 25 January 1915 during the First World War, presumably killed. | |
| 12 August 1915 | Frank Beck | 54 | Gallipoli, Turkey | A land agent for the British royal family and volunteer leader of a company, Beck and many of his men went missing during the Gallipoli campaign. His body was never identified. | |
| February 1916 | David M. Kelly | 75 | Boston, Massachusetts, U.S. | Kelly, an American lawyer, politician, and Civil War veteran, who earlier in his life was the 29th speaker of the Wisconsin State Assembly, was last seen at his law office in Boston. He was thought to be taking a train to his residence in Sharon, Massachusetts. He was never found, despite an intensive search by hired detectives. | |
| 18 July 1916 | Eric Milroy | 28 | Delville Wood, France | Milroy, a rugby union player who represented Scotland and Watsonians, was commissioned in the Black Watch at the start of World War I, but went missing on 18 July 1916, presumably killed. According to his great nephew, Milroy's mother never believed he was dead, and left the lights on in the house at night should he ever return. | |
| 8 August 1916 | Oscar Linkson | 28 | Guillemont, France | Linkson, an English footballer, enlisted in the first Football Battalion to fight in France. He went missing in a battle to seize Guillemont Station during the Battle of the Somme. His body was never found. | |
| 14 September 1916 | Luigi Forlano | 32 | Villanova, Austrian Littoral, Austria-Hungary | Forlano, an Italian footballer and founding partner of the Juventus Football Club, fought as captain of the Bersaglieri during the First World War. He went missing in Villanova (today Nova Vas nad Dragonjo, Slovenia) while combating Austrian forces, and his remains were never recovered. | |
| 28 July 1917 | Ellis Vair Reid | 27 | Ypres, Belgium | A Canadian RAF World War I flying ace credited with 19 victories, Reid's aircraft disappeared over Ypres while flying with the No. 10 (Naval) Squadron. His remains were never found. | |
| 11 September 1917 | Georges Guynemer | 22 | Poelcappelle, Belgium | Georges Guynemer was a French World War I flying ace who mysteriously disappeared on 11 September 1917 in Poelcappelle, Belgium. Reported missing in action on failing to return from a combat flying mission, Guynemer was never seen or heard from again. | |
| 27 October 1917 | Arthur Rhys-Davids | 20 | Roeselare, West Flanders, Belgium | A British flying ace and veteran of the Third Battle of Ypres, Rhys-Davids was reported missing in action on 27 October 1917. His aircraft was last seen over the Belgian city of Roeselare. | |
| 27 May 1918 | William Fiske | 32 | Aisne, France | English professional football goalkeeper and a sergeant in the Border Regiment, Fiske went missing during the Third Battle of the Aisne. His remains were never recovered. | |
| 27 May 1918 | Rudolf Windisch | 21 | Gouvrelles, France | World War I flying ace Windisch was reportedly captured as a prisoner of war in a French prison. Reports differed on his status, with some rumors claiming that he died in captivity. He was never seen again and his true fate is unknown. | |
| June 1918 | Knud Andersen | 51 | England | Danish zoologist Knud Andersen mysteriously disappeared in June 1918. His colleague Oldfield Thomas submitted his final manuscript on his behalf, stating that Andersen expected "to be absent from his scientific work for some time." | |
| 5 June 1918 | Charles Quette | 23 | France | Quette, a French World War I flying ace credited with 10 confirmed and five unconfirmed aerial victories, disappeared five days after being temporarily promoted to sous lieutenant. | |
| 28 July 1918 | Antoine Cordonnier | 26 | France | Cordonnier, a French World War I flying ace credited with five aerial victories, disappeared six months after transferring to Escadrille 15. | |
| 14 August 1918 | Herbert Gould | 26 | Douai, France | Gould was a British World War I flying ace credited with six aerial victories. His gunner/observer, Second Lieutenant Ewart William Frederick Jinman, anf he were reported as missing in action near Douai, France, on 14 August 1918. | |
| 3 September 1918 | Arnaldo Berni | 24 | Punta San Matteo, County of Tyrol, Austria-Hungary | Berni, a Royal Italian Army soldier noted for using his mountaineering skills to repel the Austro-Hungarian Army, was declared missing in action during the Battle of San Matteo. | |
| 2 June 1919 | Mansell Richard James | 25 | Tyringham, Massachusetts, U.S. | Canadian flying ace James was last seen in western Massachusetts on 2 June, just days after a record-setting flight between Atlantic City and Boston. | |
| 2 December 1919 | Ambrose Small | 56 | Toronto, Canada | The Canadian millionaire disappeared from his office. He was last seen at 5:30 pm on 2 December 1919 at the Grand Opera House. | |

== 1920s ==
| Date | Person(s) | Age | Missing from | Circumstances | Refs. |
|---|---|---|---|---|---|
| 1920 | Homer Lemay | 6 | Waukesha, Wisconsin, U.S. | Lemay disappeared in 1920, and on 8 March 1921 the body of an unidentified boy was found murdered in Waukesha, Wisconsin, and nicknamed Little Lord Fauntleroy. Many years later authorities said that the body might have been that of Lemay. | |
| 1 April 1920 | Alexander Trishatny | 50 | Russian SFSR | Trishatny, a Russian politician and founding member of the Union of the Russian People, was detained and disappeared by Cheka authorities on 1 April 1920. | |
| 21 April 1920 | Sergei Trishatny | 55 | Petrograd, Russian SFSR | A founding member of the Union of the Russian People, Sergei Trishatny was detained by Cheka authorities on 17 January 1920 for his connection to the monarchist party. He escaped from a detention camp in Petrograd on 1 April, the same day his younger brother Alexander was detained. The Cheka officially added him to their wanted list on 21 April. His ultimate fate is unknown. | |
| c. September 1920 | Clayton Kratz | 23 | Molotschna, Ukraine | The Mennonite relief worker from the U.S. state of Pennsylvania left the U.S. on 1 September 1920 to travel to Russia. While there, he was arrested by military authorities at the village of Halbstadt, likely on suspicion of being a spy. He was held with other political prisoners and later transferred; his fate after that is unknown. | |
| September 1920 | Yakiv Sukhovolski | 39-40 | Millerovo, Ukrainian SSR | Yakiv Sukhovolski was a Ukrainian writer and anarcho-syndicalist who went missing from Millerovo, Ukrainian SSR in September 1920. Whatever became of him is unknown. | |
| 28 September 1920 | Victor Grayson | 39 | London, England | The British former Member of Parliament was not seen again after telling friends on 28 September 1920 that he was going to the Queen's Hotel in Leicester Square and would be back. He was also seen the same day by an artist who knew him entering a house in Thames Ditton belonging to Maundy Gregory, a corrupt honours dealer who is alleged to have murdered Grayson because he had been investigating Gregory's activities. | |
| 29 April 1921? | Alexander Dubrovin | 66 | Moscow, Russian SFSR | Dubrovin, a Russian politician and leader of the Union of the Russian People, was supposedly arrested and killed by Cheka authorities for organizing pogroms and murders in the mid-1900s. However, poor record keeping and claims from different historians place his last known sightings from 1918 to 1929, making it unclear when his actual disappearance occurred. | |
| September 1921 | Dick Rowland | 19 | Tulsa, Oklahoma, U.S. | The Tulsa race massacre probably began because Rowland, an African American shoe shiner at a nearby store, tripped in an elevator and grabbed onto Page, a white elevator operator, to avoid falling, causing Page to scream. A witness probably mistook this for an attempted rape. A small number of sources theorize that Rowland and Page could have been lovers who were having a lover's quarrel in the elevator. It is uncertain if either Rowland or Page were their real names, and Page has been theorized to have been as young as 15 or as old as 21, although most sources agree she was 17. Rowland survived the massacre, likely because his police protection in jail ironically made him safer than almost any other black person in Tulsa. Both Page and Rowland disappeared after Page helped get the charges against Rowland dropped following the massacre, and nothing is known for sure about the rest of their lives. | |
| September 1921 | Sarah Page | c. 17 | Tulsa, Oklahoma, U.S. | | |
| 1922 | Martin Dibobe | 45 | Monrovia, Liberia | Dibobe was a Cameroonian train driver living in Germany who went to visit to his home country in 1922. After being denied entry there, he traveled to his cousin in Monrovia, Liberia. There is no record of him after he left for Liberia, and he is believed to have died there. | |
| 22 September 1922 | Alejandro Carrascosa | 21 | Buenos Aires, Argentina | Carrascosa, an Argentine poet, writer and student, disappeared on 22 September and left hints that he was not going to be seen again, and was not. | |
| 25-26 May 1923 | Pierre Quémeneur | 45 | France | A businessman and local politician, Quémeneur went missing during the last leg on a business trip between Morlaix and Paris. Guillaume Seznec, a sawmill overseer and Quémeneur's partner in this venture, claimed to have dropped him off at a train station, but aside from unconfirmed sightings, Quémeneur was never seen again. Despite the lack of a dead body, Seznec was convicted of having murdered Quémeneur. | |
| 19 October 1923 | Pearl Turner | 3 | West-Central Arkansas, U.S. | Turner was a three-year-old American girl who wandered from her home on 19 October 1923. She was never seen again. | |
| 1924 | Liu Menggeng | c. 43 | Republic of China | Liu, a politician and physician of the Republic of China and Manchukuo, left office in 1924 and was never seen again. | |
| September 1924 | Frederick Wilkerson Waugh | c. 52 | Kahnawake, Quebec, Canada | Waugh, an amateur Canadian ethnologist and natural historian, stopped in Kahnawake, a Mohawk reserve near Montreal, in order to acquire museum collections for the Geological Survey of Canada. He vanished mysteriously. Investigations into his disappearance by the RCMP and the Geological Survey were inconclusive. A colleague speculated that Waugh fell from a railway bridge while heading to the island of Montreal. | |
| 29 May 1925 | Percy Fawcett | 57 | Mato Grosso, Brazil | Fawcett, a British archaeologist and explorer, together with his eldest son and a friend, was last seen traveling into the jungle of Mato Grosso in Brazil to search for a hidden city called the Lost City of Z. Several unconfirmed sightings and many conflicting reports and theories explaining their disappearance followed, but despite more than a dozen follow-up expeditions and the recovery of some of Fawcett's belongings, their fate remains unknown. | |
| 5 November 1925 | Sidney Reilly | 51 | Moscow, Soviet Union | British spy Sidney Reilly set off for the Soviet Union in an attempt to overthrow the Bolshevik regime. He was said to have been captured and shot on 5 November 1925. His fate has not been verified and the location of his body is not known. A photo alleged to be of his corpse was not identifiable. Following several alleged sightings of him, it was speculated that he was still alive. | |
| 13 November 1925 | Alice Corbett | 19 | Northampton, Massachusetts, U.S. | An American college student, Corbett was last seen leaving her residence on the campus of Smith College on the morning of 13 November. Extensive searches of urban and wilderness areas across Western Massachusetts failed to yield any evidence of her fate. Her case received wide publicity through regional newspapers and national wire services. | |
| 15 April 1926 | Frederick McDonald | 53–54 | Sydney, Australia | An Australian politician, McDonald set off from Martin Place, Sydney, for a meeting with Jack Lang two blocks away, but failed to arrive. He was possibly murdered by his political rival Thomas Ley. In 1947, Ley was convicted at the Old Bailey of the "Chalkpit Murder", that of a barman in England, and sentenced to hang, but was then declared insane and sent to Broadmoor high-security psychiatric hospital, where he died of a cerebral hemorrhage two months later. | |
| 30 October 1926 | Marvin Clark | 73–74 | Portland, Oregon, U.S. | A retired American sheriff, Clark disappeared en route to visit his daughter by bus during the Halloween weekend. His disappearance has the distinction of being the oldest active missing person case in the United States. | |
| 6 August 1927 | Włodzimierz Zagórski | 45 | Vilnius, Lithuania | The Austro-Hungarian military intelligence officer, Polish brigadier general, staff officer and aviator disappeared while traveling by train to a meeting in Warsaw, Poland. | |
| 26 August 1927 | Paul Redfern | 25 | Venezuela | An American musician and a pilot from Columbia, South Carolina, Redfern became known during the summer of 1927 for attempting to fly from Brunswick, Georgia to Rio de Janeiro, Brazil. He was last sighted inland over Venezuela on 26 August. | |
| 18 November 1928 | Glen Hyde | 29 | Grand Canyon, Arizona, U.S. | The American newlyweds Glen and Bessie Hyde were last seen on 18 November 1928 and disappeared while attempting to raft the Colorado River rapids of the Grand Canyon. | |
| 18 November 1928 | Bessie Hyde | 22 | Grand Canyon, Arizona, U.S. | The American newlyweds Glen and Bessie Hyde were last seen on 18 November 1928 and disappeared while attempting to raft the Colorado River rapids of the Grand Canyon. | |
| 15 April 1929 | J. Steward Davis | 38–39 | Baltimore, Maryland, U.S. | Davis, an American lawyer and political activist in Baltimore, Maryland, disappeared under suspicious circumstances on 15 April 1929 and was never heard from again. | |
| 25 December 1929 | Larry Griffin | 48–49 | Stradbally, County Waterford, Ireland | Griffin, an Irish postman, disappeared from the village of Stradbally, County Waterford, on Christmas Day 1929. He is alleged to have been murdered in a drunken altercation and his body disposed of to conceal the fact that the pub was illegally serving alcohol on Christmas Day, a fact which would have threatened the livelihoods of both the publican and members of the local police force allegedly drinking at the premises. | |

== 1930s ==
| Date | Person(s) | Age | Missing from | Circumstances | Refs. |
|---|---|---|---|---|---|
| 19 April 1930 | Crosbie Garstin | 42 | Salcombe, England | Crosbie Garstin was a poet and best-selling novelist who mysteriously disappeared in the Salcombe estuary on 19 April 1930. Garstin's body was never recovered. | |
| 6 May 1930 | Tony Buccola | 40 | Los Angeles, California, U.S. | A Los Angeles crime family boss who "vanished"; the only trace of him was his wrecked car found two days after his disappearance in Venice, California. | |
| 15 May 1930 | Mary Agnes Moroney | 2 | Chicago, Illinois, U.S. | Moroney went missing after her mother, a struggling 17-year-old mother of two, gave her to a stranger calling herself "Julia Otis" in exchange for $2 on the understanding that the woman would take care of the girl in California for a short time and then return her to the Moroneys' Chicago home when things were better. She never did, and the ensuing investigation attracted national media attention. The girl was never located, and the case remains the oldest unsolved missing-persons case of this nature in the files of the Chicago Missing Persons Bureau. A California woman's belief that she was Mary Agnes was disproven by DNA testing. Familial DNA testing performed in 2023 determined that Jeanette Burchard, a Florida woman who had died in 2003, was Mary Agnes Moroney. Though the results are conclusive, the case is still officially unsolved since Burchard's body itself has not been tested, and the perpetrator(s) have not been identified. However, the Chicago Police cold case unit have pronounced the case closed. | |
| 6 August 1930 | Joseph Force Crater | 41 | Manhattan, New York, U.S. | An associate justice of the New York Supreme Court, Crater was last seen leaving a restaurant on West 45th Street in Manhattan. He was never seen or heard from again. His mistress, Sally Lou Ritz, 22, was falsely said to have disappeared a few weeks later, but was interviewed by police as late as July 1937. Crater's disappearance, which prompted one of the most sensational manhunts of the 20th century, was the subject of widespread media attention and a grand jury investigation. Crater was declared legally dead in 1939 and his missing persons file was officially closed in 1979; however, cold case squad detectives have investigated new leads as recently as 2005. | |
| 24 October 1930 | Emil Kauppi | 55 | Tampere, Finland | Kauppi was a Finnish composer primarily known for his 1925 composition Päiväkummun pidot (The Feast at Solhaug). Following the premiere of his poorly reviewed Nummisuutarit (The Cobblers on the Heath), he was last seen in Tampere on 24 October 1930, and is thought to have died by suicide. | |
| 15 October 1931 | Joseph Ardizzone | 46 | California, U.S. | Los Angeles crime family boss; vanished while driving from his home to pick up a relative; declared legally dead seven years later. No trace of him was ever found. | |
| 1932 | Jack Black | 60–61 | United States | Author Jack Black is believed to have died by suicide in 1932 by drowning, as he reportedly told his friends that if life got too grim, he would row out into New York Harbor and, with weights tied to his feet, drop overboard. | |
| 2 February 1933 | Danny Walsh | 40 | Pawtuxet Village, Warwick, Rhode Island, U.S. | An organized crime figure in Providence, Rhode Island, involved in bootlegging, Walsh was kidnapped from Pawtuxet Village in Warwick and is believed to have been murdered. His body was never found. | |
| 17 February 1933 | Julien Torma | 30 | Tyrol, Austria | A French Dadaist writer, Torma never returned from a 17 February trip into the Austrian Tyrol. | |
| 20 June 1933 | Mariano Barberán | 37 | Mexico, near Villahermosa | Both Spanish aviators disappeared in the vicinity of Villahermosa, Mexico on 20 June 1933 while on a flight to Mexico City in the Br.19 TF Super Bidon Cuatro Vientos, which they previously used for a flight from Spain to Cuba ten days prior. | |
| 20 June 1933 | Joaquín Collar Serra | 26 | Mexico, near Villahermosa | Both Spanish aviators disappeared in the vicinity of Villahermosa, Mexico on 20 June 1933 while on a flight to Mexico City in the Br.19 TF Super Bidon Cuatro Vientos, which they previously used for a flight from Spain to Cuba ten days prior. | |
| 1933 | C. B. Johnston | c. 38 | Ohio, U.S. | Johnston, an American college athlete and coach, sent a postcard to his wife from Zanesville, Ohio, saying he was on his way to Chicago to publish a book after being fired as head football coach of what is now Appalachian State University. He was never heard from again. | |
| 1934 | Wallace Fard Muhammad | 56–57 | Detroit, Michigan, U.S. | Founder of the Nation of Islam, Muhammad left Detroit and was never heard from again. | |
| 19 February 1934 | Georg Baumann | 42 | Shanghai, China | Estonian Greco-Roman wrestler Baumann was erroneously reported as having died during the First World War, but later reports claim that he had died sometime before 19 February 1934, while working as a wrestler and circus artist. | |
| c. November 1934 | Everett Ruess | 20 | Escalante, Utah, U.S. | Ruess, a young American artist, disappeared while traveling through the deserts of Utah. | |
| 22 November 1934 | Etta Riel | 20 | Worcester, Massachusetts, U.S. | Riel was an American woman who vanished on the day of a scheduled paternity hearing against her former boyfriend. The case was complicated by anonymous telephone calls placed to a local train station the night of her disappearance and a telegram sent to her attorney weeks later from an unknown individual impersonating her. Extensive police searches across Central Massachusetts failed to locate her and the case was never solved. | |
| 1935 | Li Yuan | 43–44 | Republic of China | Li Yuan was a politician of the Republic of China and later Manchukuo who disappeared in 1935. The circumstances of his later life and death are unknown. | |
| 2 September 1935 | Yoshio Fujimaki | 24 | Tokyo City, Empire of Japan | Yoshio Fujimaki was a printmaker who disappeared from fellow printmaker Tadashige Ono's home in Mukojima Ward, Tokyo. While the circumstances of his disappearance are unclear, Ono believed he threw himself in to the Sumida River, which was a subject of one of his artworks. | |
| 9 September 1935 | Abraham Weinberg | 35 | Manhattan, New York, U.S. | A Jewish New York City mobster and hitman, Weinberg was last seen leaving a Midtown Manhattan nightclub. Several conflicting reports emerged about the manner of his death, but none were ever confirmed and his body was never recovered. | |
| 1936 | Miguel Arcángel Roscigna | 44–45 | Argentina | Argentine anarchist militant, politician, and fugitive Roscigna was sent to prison in 1927 and released in 1936. He disappeared after his release and was never seen again. | |
| 2 April 1936 | Katherine E. Hull | 22 | Lebanon Springs, New York, U.S. | Set out for a walk while visiting her grandmother and never returned; human remains identified in December 1943, few miles from where she was last seen, were tentatively identified as hers. | |
| 7 December 1936 | Jean Mermoz | 35 | Aubenton, France | French air pilot Jean Mermoz went missing on 7 December 1936 while flying his Latécoère 300 Croix-du-Sud near Aubenton, Aisne. It is assumed that the plane crashed in the sea, but it is unconfirmed since his body was never recovered. | |
| 3 June 1937 | Juliet Stuart Poyntz | 50 | New York City, New York, U.S. | An American communist and ex-intelligence agent for the Soviet Union, Juliet Poyntz disappeared on 3 June 1937. A police investigation turned up no clues to her fate, and her belongings appeared to be untouched. | |
| 2 July 1937 | Amelia Earhart | 39 | Pacific Ocean | Famed American pilot, disappeared on an attempted round-the-world flight | |
| 25 March 1938 | Ettore Majorana | 31 | Palermo, Kingdom of Italy | Ettore Majorana was an Italian theoretical physicist who disappeared under mysterious circumstances after purchasing a ticket to travel by ship from Palermo to Naples. | |
| 17 April 1938 | Andrew Carnegie Whitfield | 28 | New York City, New York, U.S. | Whitfield, the nephew of wealthy steel magnate Andrew Carnegie, mysteriously disappeared shortly after he departed from Roosevelt Field on Long Island, New York on the morning of 17 April 1938. | |
| 8 May 1938 | Marjorie West | 4 | McKean County, Pennsylvania, U.S. | Four-year-old Marjorie West disappeared from a Mother's Day picnic after being briefly left alone by her sister. | |
| 2 July 1938 | Alfred Beilhartz | 3–4 | Rocky Mountain National Park, Colorado, U.S. | Beilhartz disappeared after falling behind his parents while hiking during a vacation at Rocky Mountain National Park in Colorado. | |
| 19 March 1939 | Lloyd L. Gaines | 27–28 | Chicago, Illinois, U.S. | Gaines was a central figure in the legal case Missouri ex rel. Gaines v. Canada, which was an early success for the civil rights movement. One evening, he left his Alpha Phi Alpha fraternity house in Chicago, having told the housekeeper he was going to buy some stamps, and was never seen or heard from again. Some accounts suggest he was living in New York or Mexico City in the late 1940s. | |
| September 1939 | Stanisław Ptak | 37 | Poland | Polish footballer Ptak disappeared during the Soviet invasion of Poland in September 1939, and was believed to have been killed by the NKVD while attempting to cross the border. | |
| September 1939 | Stanisław Zieliński | 27 | Poland | Zieliński, a Polish cyclist who competed in the individual and team road race events at the 1936 Summer Olympics, disappeared in September 1939 while attempting to flee Warsaw during the Invasion of Poland. | |
| 3 September 1939 | Rita Gorgonowa | 38 | Poland | Gorgonowa, a governess who was convicted of murdering a child in her care, disappeared after being released from prison. | |
| 7 December 1939 | Barbara Newhall Follett | 25 | Brookline, Massachusetts, U.S. | An American child prodigy novelist, Follett had enjoyed critical and commercial success with two novels published before she was 14 in the late 1920s. Her work suffered after that due to the collapse of her parents' marriage and changing popular tastes; she became increasingly despondent throughout the 1930s until in 1939, believing her husband had been involved with another woman, she walked out of her apartment with $30 ($589 in 2021) and was never seen again. | |

== 1940s ==
| Date | Person(s) | Age | Missing from | Circumstances | Refs. |
|---|---|---|---|---|---|
| 1940s | Kou Yingjie | 60–69? | Republic of China | Kou Yingjie who was also known by his courtesy name of "Bichen" was a military leader of the Republic of China (1912–1949) who belonged to the Zhili clique. Kou disappeared sometime in the 1940s after he was appointed to the Councilor in the General Staff Office and was never heard of again. | |
| 22 June 1941 | Wolfgang Schellmann | 30 | Grodno, Byelorussian SSR | German Luftwaffe aviator and fighter ace Schellmann went missing on the first day of Operation Barbarossa, reportedly killed by NKVD troops. | |
| After 22 June 1941 | Izaak Appel | c. 36 | Kyiv, Ukrainian SSR | A Jewish Polish chess master, Appel disappeared following the Nazi invasion of the Soviet Union. His fate, and the precise whereabouts of his remains, remain unknown. | |
| 25 June 1941 | Dmitry Ivanyuk | 41 | Slawharad, Byelorussian SSR | Ivanyuk, a Soviet Red Army colonel and leader of a 4th Army division, went missing after the division was surrounded during Operation Barbarossa. He was declared missing in action on 17 July 1941. | |
| July 1941 | Thomas C. Latimore | 51 | Hawaii, U.S. | American naval officer Thomas Calloway Latimore, who was captain of the USS Dobbin and the 24th (22nd unique) Governor of American Samoa, disappeared in Hawaii believed to be in July 1941. | |
| c. July 1941 | Jaan Tõnisson | 72 | Estonian SSR | As one of the foremost Estonian political leaders, Tõnisson was arrested during the Soviet occupation, put on trial and was thought to have been shot around July 1941, but his exact whereabouts after the trial remain unknown. | |
| 15–18 July 1941 | Vasily Yevdokimov | 43 | Byelorussian SSR | Yevdokimov, a major general of the Red Army who commanded the 50th Rifle Division in the Byelorussian SSR during Operation Barbarossa, was discharged and sent to a civilian hospital after he suffered a mental breakdown, but his further fate is unknown. | |
| August 1941 | Alexandru Robot | 25–26 | Odessa, Ukrainian SSR | Robot, a Romanian, Moldovan and Soviet poet, was last seen in August 1941 in Odessa, Ukrainian SSR and is believed to have died after that. | |
| 3 October 1941 | Heinrich Hoffmann | 28 | Shatalovo, Russian SSR | German Luftwaffe flying ace Hoffmann was presumably shot down by a member of a Soviet aviation regiment. | |
| 6 December 1941 | Alexander Zatonski | 26 | Cyrenaica, Libya | Zatonski, an American RAF pilot and member of the No. 238 Squadron, disappeared while engaging a German Messerschmitt Bf 109. Neither his remains nor his plane were ever recovered. | |
| 1942 | Johann Schulz | Unknown | Location unknown | German swimmer Schulz is believed to have gone missing during World War II. | |
| 14 February 1942 | Franz Eckerle | 29 | Velikiye Luki, Russian SFSR | Eckerle, a German Luftwaffe fighter ace and aerobatics pilot, is believed to have been shot down and killed while fighting in Soviet territory. | |
| 15 February 1942 | Walter Brown | 56 | Rengat, Dutch East Indies | Brown, an Australian recipient of the Victoria Cross, is believed to have been killed after his regiment moved up to the front enemy line to make a final stand. | |
| 22 March 1942 | Arved Crüger | 30 | Malta | Crüger, a German Luftwaffe Geschwaderkommodore, is believed to have been shot down by British forces in Malta. | |
| 16 May 1942 | Mark Stolberg | 19–20 | Novorossiysk, Russian SFSR | Stolberg, a Russian chess master who entered the Soviet Army at the end of 1940, disappeared in the battle of Malaya Zemlya on 16 May 1942. | |
| 16 June 1942 | John Frost | 23 | Bir Hakeim, Egypt | A high-scoring SAAF flying ace, Frost was last known to be battling Bf 109s from Jagdgeschwader 27 after encountering them while escorting Douglas Bostons. It is believed that he was shot down by either Hans-Joachim Marseille, a very prominent German ace, or Günter Steinhausen, a German Experte. | |
| 20 July 1942 | Howard Mayers | 32 | Western Desert, Egypt | An Australian flying ace of the Royal Air Force Volunteer Reserve, Mayers disappeared after being forced to land in the Western Desert. His aircraft was later found, but he was not and it is believed that he either died by ground fire or later while being transported to Europe to be interned in a prisoner of war camp. | |
| 25 December 1942 | Georg Schentke | 23 | Stalingrad, Russian SFSR | A Luftwaffe flying ace and recipient of the Knight's Cross of the Iron Cross, Schentke was last seen on 25 December 1942 when bailing out of his aircraft over Soviet positions after it was damaged by debris. | |
| 1943 | Ernst Balz | 38–39 | Location unknown | Balz, a German sculptor whose work was part of the sculpture event in the art competition at the 1936 Summer Olympics, went missing in action in 1943 during World War II, with his official date of death recorded as 31 December 1945. | |
| 1943 | Abraham Gancwajch | 41–42 | Warsaw, Poland | Gancwajch, a prominent Nazi collaborator in the Warsaw Ghetto during the occupation of Poland in World War II and a Jewish "kingpin" of the ghetto underworld, was last seen in 1943 and is rumored to have been killed. | |
| 1943 | Endre Rudnyánszky | 57–58 | Russian SFSR | A Hungarian lawyer, military officer, and communist, Rudnyánszky was last seen in the Russian SFSR in 1943. It is believed that he may have died that year. | |
| February 1943 | Xia Suchu | 53–54 | Republic of China | Xia Suchu was a Republic of China politician who was important during the Provisional Government of the Republic of China (1937–1940). He disappeared in February 1943 after resigning as Chief to the Agency for State Affairs of the North China Political Council, and his whereabouts thereafter are unknown. | |
| 6 March 1943 | Hans Beißwenger | 26 | Staraya Russa, Russian SFSR | Beißwenger, a German Luftwaffe fighter ace, was reported missing in action following an air battle close to Lake Ilmen in Staraya Russia on 6 March 1943. | |
| 16 July 1943 | Günther Scheel | 21 | Bolkhov, Russian SFSR, Soviet Union | German Luftwaffe flying ace Scheel is believed to have been killed after shooting down two Yak-9 fighters and subsequently colliding with the wreckage of the second. However, one source indicates that he may have bailed out and landed behind enemy lines. He was reportedly seen alive at a camp at Yelabuga in 1946, and in a camp at Solny in 1948 receiving medical treatment. | |
| 27 July 1943 | Josef Jennewein | 23 | Oryol, Russian SFSR | Josef Jennewein was a German world champion alpine skier from St Anton am Arlberg, Austria who served as a Luftwaffe fighter pilot credited with 86 air victories. He was posted as missing in action on the Eastern Front near Mtsensk in Oryol Oblast, Russian SFSR on 27 July 1943 and was never seen or heard from again. | |
| 19 August 1943 | Max Stotz | 31 | Kirov, Russian SFSR | Stotz, an Austrian Luftwaffe military aviator and Staffelkapitän, was last seen drifting down over Soviet held territory after bailing out of his aircraft following aerial combat with Yakovlev Yak-9 fighters. | |
| 29 August 1943 | Berthold Korts | 31 | Amvrosievka, Donetsk Oblast, Ukrainian SSR | German Luftwaffe military aviator Korts and his wingman were last seen in combat with Soviet P-39 Airacobra fighters in the vicinity of Amvrosievka on 29 August 1943. | |
| 5 September 1943 | Heinz Schmidt | 23 | Kotelva, Ukrainian SSR | German Luftwaffe military aviator and fighter ace Schmidt is thought to have been accidentally shot down by allies while fighting in the Ukrainian SSR. | |
| 20 November 1943 | Dan Billany | 30 | Capistrello, Italy | An English novelist, Billany served as a lieutenant in the British Army when he was captured and became a prisoner of war in Italy. After the capitulation of Italy, he hid in the countryside from the Germans. Billany and three others eventually attempted to make their way over the Apennines towards the Allied forces. They were last seen on 20 November 1943 in Capistrello, Italy. | |
| 27 November 1943 | Lee Kizzire | 27 | Wewak, Papua New Guinea | Kizzire, an American football player and later a USAAC pilot, was shot down over Papua New Guinea. His plane was found in a lagoon, but his remains were never recovered, and Kizzire was declared dead on 22 January 1946. | |
| 11 December 1943 | Rudolf Wagner | 22 | Zhitomir Oblast, Ukrainian SSR | Wagner, a Luftwaffe flying ace and recipient of the Knight's Cross of the Iron Cross credited with 81 aerial victories, all of them achieved over the Eastern Front, was posted as missing in action after aerial combat over Zhytomyr Oblast, Ukraine on 11 December 1943. | |
| 26 December 1943 | Edward Cragg | 24 | Cape Gloucester, New Britain | A flying ace with fifteen confirmed kills, Cragg was reported missing in action near Cape Gloucester, New Britain on 26 December 1943. His P-38 aircraft was last observed descending to the ground after being shot down in combat with enemy fighters. On the mission he was shot down, Cragg claimed his 15th aerial victory, becoming a triple ace. He was declared legally dead in 1946. | |
| 1943–1944 | Herschel Grynszpan | 22 | Magdeburg, Germany | Grynszpan was the Jewish exile from Germany whose 1938 assassination of diplomat Ernst vom Rath in Paris, France was the trigger for Kristallnacht in Germany. For various reasons, largely legal delays, a planned trial was never held in either France or (after 1940) Germany during which Grynszpan was held in various prisons and concentration camps. Adolf Eichmann testified at his 1961 trial in Jerusalem that he had interrogated Grynszpan in Magdeburg in either late 1943 or early 1944, but after that there is no record of his whereabouts or ultimate fate. The West German government had him declared legally dead in 1960. | |
| January 1944 | Bonifacio Mencias | 55 | Philippines | A Filipino physician and guerilla sympathizer, Mencias was arrested by the Kenpeitai for his affiliation with the anti-Japanese forces. It is presumed that he was executed by them not long after his arrest, but his ultimate fate is unclear. | |
| January 1944 | Ilya Timofeyevich Osipov | 22 | Soviet Union | A Red Army soldier who took part in numerous battles, most notably the Battle of the Dnieper, Osipov was awarded the title Hero of the Soviet Union on 10 January 1944, but disappeared sometime later in the month. | |
| 22 January 1944 | Otto Gaiser | 24 | Berdichev, Ukrainian SSR | Gaiser, a German Luftwaffe flying ace and recipient of the Knight's Cross of the Iron Cross, was last seen battling Il-2 Sturmoviks near Berdichev, Ukraine, presumably being shot down by the Soviet ground defences. | |
| 23 April 1944 | Rocco Perri | 56 | Hamilton, Canada | An organized crime figure in Ontario, Perri was last seen in Hamilton, Ontario on 23 April 1944. His body has never been found, though it is speculated that he was murdered by being fitted with cement shoes and thrown into Hamilton Harbour. | |
| June 1944 | Werner Scholl | 21 | Soviet Union | Werner Scholl was the younger brother of Hans and Sophie Scholl, who were best known for their resistance to Nazism as part of the White Rose. He was declared missing in action in June 1944, assumably dying on the Soviet front. | |
| 24 June 1944 | Hans Hahne | 49 | Vitebsk, Byelorussian SSR | Hahne, a German officer in the Wehrmacht who commanded the 197th Infantry Division, went missing in action on 24 June 1944 near Vitebsk during the Soviet Vitebsk–Orsha Offensive of Operation Bagration. | |
| July 1944 | Robert Byerly | 29 | Paris, France | Byerly, an American-born Canadian soldier and agent for the British Special Operations Executive, was last seen in July 1944 and is believed to have been killed at the Gross-Rosen concentration camp in Poland. | |
| August 1944 | Valter Krimm | 41 | Sinimäed Hills, Estonian SSR | Krimm, an Estonian politician who joined the German military after the German occupation of Estonia during World War II, went missing during the Battle of the Blue Hills in August 1944 and is presumed to have been killed. | |
| 7 August 1944 | Horst Ademeit | 32 | Daugavpils, Latvian SSR | Ademeit, a German Luftwaffe flying ace and military aviator, disappeared while pursuing a Soviet Ilyushin Il-2. He was declared missing in action, and never seen again. | |
| 18 August 1944 | Sheila Fox | 6 | Farnworth, England | Fox disappeared in Farnworth, near Bolton, Lancashire. Witnesses claim they saw Fox riding on the handlebars of a bike being pedalled by a 25–30-year-old man. In 2001 a witness came forward claiming he saw a local resident digging a hole on his property in the area where Fox disappeared. The property owner was revealed to have been convicted of rape and child molestation but Fox's remains were not found. | |
| 18 October 1944 | Walter Stettner Ritter von Grabenhofen | 49 | Avala, Serbia | Stettner, a German general in the Wehrmacht of Nazi Germany during World War II and a recipient of the Knight's Cross of the Iron Cross, went missing on Mount Avala near Belgrade in Serbia on 18 October 1944 after his unit was cut off during the Soviet Belgrade Offensive and is believed to have been killed in action. | |
| 26 October 1944 | Gertrude Tompkins Silver | 33 | Palm Springs, California, U.S. | Silver is the only Women Airforce Service Pilots member to go missing during World War II. She departed from Mines Field (Los Angeles International Airport) for Palm Springs, on 26 October 1944, flying a P-51D Mustang destined for New Jersey. She never arrived at Palm Springs and due to reporting errors, a search for her was not started until three days later. Despite an extensive ground and water search no trace of Silver or the aircraft were found. | |
| 3 November 1944 | Ján Golian | 39 | Flossenbürg concentration camp, Germany | These two Slovak generals and commanders of the 1st Czechoslovak army during the Slovak National Uprising, fighting against the occupying Nazi forces, were captured in Pohronský Bukovec and transported to Flossenbürg, where both men were presumably tortured and killed. | |
| 3 November 1944 | Rudolf Viest | 54 | Flossenbürg concentration camp, Germany | These two Slovak generals and commanders of the 1st Czechoslovak army during the Slovak National Uprising, fighting against the occupying Nazi forces, were captured in Pohronský Bukovec and transported to Flossenbürg, where both men were presumably tortured and killed. | |
| 1944 | Gustav Albrecht, 5th Prince of Sayn-Wittgenstein-Berleburg | 36–37 | Orsha, Byelorussian SSR | Gustav Albrecht was the head and prince of the House of Sayn-Wittgenstein whose father was Richard, 4th Prince of Sayn-Wittgenstein-Berleburg. He was serving as an officer in the German Army when he disappeared while on a mission near the Belarusian city of Orsha, never to be heard from again. | |
| 1944 | Erna Petermann | 31–32 | Germany | Petermann was a high-ranking female overseer at two Nazi concentration camps during the closing of World War II. She was last seen in 1944. | |
| 1944 | Karla Mayer | 35–36 | Auschwitz, Oswiecim, Poland | Mayer was a German guard at three Nazi death camps during World War II. She disappeared in 1944 and her fate remains a mystery. | |
| 1944 or 1945 | Max Amann | 38–40 | Location unknown | Amann, a German water polo player who competed in the 1928 Summer Olympics, went missing in action in 1944 or 1945 during World War II, with his official date of death given as 24 December 1945. | |
| 1945 | Erich Akt | 46–47 | Germany | Akt, a German Nazi Party official in Gau Berlin and an SA-Oberführer in the Sturmabteilung, was officially listed as missing in 1945 at the end of World War II in Europe. He was legally declared dead on 4 July 1961. | |
| January 1945 | Fritz Dietrich | 39 | Heiligenbeil, East Prussia, Germany | Dietrich, a German musicologist and composer who was conscripted into the army, disappeared on the Eastern Front in the area around Heiligenbeil at the start of the East Prussian offensive by the Red Army. | |
| 1 January 1945 | Alfred Druschel | 27 | Aachen, Germany | Druschel, a German Luftwaffe combat pilot and recipient of the Knight's Cross of the Iron Cross with Oak Leaves and Swords, disappeared after becoming separated from his formation following a heavy flak attack south of Aachen. | |
| 6 January 1945 | Josefa Llanes Escoda | 46 | Sampaloc, Manila, Philippines | The Filipina civic leader, social worker, suffragette, and founder of the Girl Scouts of the Philippines was arrested on 27 August 1944, tortured, and last seen on 6 January 1945, presumably being executed by the occupying Japanese forces and buried in an unmarked grave after that. | |
| 17 January 1945 | Raoul Wallenberg | 32 | Budapest, Hungary | A Swedish diplomat credited with saving the lives of at least 20,000 Hungarian Jews during the Holocaust, Wallenberg was arrested on espionage charges in Budapest following the arrival of the Soviet army. His fate remains a mystery despite hundreds of purported sightings in Soviet prisons, some as recent as the 1980s. In 2001, after 10 years of research, a Swedish-Russian panel concluded that Wallenberg probably died or was executed in Soviet custody on 17 July 1947, but to date no hard evidence has been found to confirm this. In 2010, evidence from Russian archives surfaced suggesting he was alive after the presumed execution date. | |
| 31 January 1945 | Eduard Deisenhofer | 35 | Arnswalde, Germany | Deisenhofer, a German Waffen-SS commander who served in several combat divisions on the Eastern and Western fronts, disappeared while travelling to a new command post. | |
| 10 February 1945 | Ernst-Heinrich Schmauser | 55 | Altenrode, near Breslau (today, Wrocław, Poland) | An SS-Obergruppenführer and Higher SS and Police Leader in Silesia, Schmauser disappeared while driving from Waldenburg (today, Wałbrzych) in a convoy of several vehicles. He encountered German troops near Altenrode, who warned him that Soviet armored spearheads had already broken through, but he drove on anyway. He is believed to have been captured or killed by the Red Army and was legally declared dead on 23 February 1945, effective 31 December. | |
| 14 February 1945 | Supriyadi | 21 | Blitar, East Java, Indonesia | Supriyadi disappeared after the failed PETA revolt against Japanese occupation on 14 February 1945. Later that year, he was named Minister for Public Security in the first cabinet formed by the newly declaring-independence Indonesia. However, he failed to appear and was replaced on 20 October 1945 by ad interim minister Muhammad Soeljoadikusuma. To this day his fate remains unknown. | |
| 23 February 1945 | Rudolf Lange | 34 | Poznań, Poland (alleged) | A German Sicherheitsdienst member serving in Riga, Latvia, Lange ordered the mass extermination of numerous Jews in several ghettos. Shortly after being reassigned to Poland, he was surrounded by Soviet forces, and is thought to have died (possibly by suicide) during battle. | |
| 27 February 1945 | Pierre Unik | 36 | Pomezní Boudy, Slovakia | A French surrealist poet, screenwriter and journalist, Unik was captured in a prisoner of war camp in Silesia in 1940. He escaped in 1945, but disappeared in Slovakia while attempting to make it back to France. | |
| 28 February 1945 | Heinz Schubert | 37 | Oderbruch, Germany (alleged) | A composer and kapellmeister who had a successful career in Nazi Germany despite his reservations about the regime, Schubert disappeared shortly after his draft into the Volkssturm as a gunner, presumably being killed in battle. | |
| 3 March 1945 | Karl Thom | 51 | Pillau, East Prussia | German World War I flying ace Thom disappeared under obscure circumstances in Pillau, East Prussia on 3 March 1945. | |
| March 1945 | Wilhelm Schitli | 32 | Location unknown | Schitli, a German SS-Hauptsturmführer and Schutzhaftlagerführer in the Neuengamme concentration camp, disappeared in March 1945, and was declared missing on 31 March, never to be seen again. | |
| April 1945 | Aleksejs Anufrijevs | 33 | Courland Pocket, Latvian SSR | Latvian basketball player Anufrijevs became the first European champion after winning a gold medal at EuroBasket 1935. Following the Soviet occupation of Latvia, he was conscripted in the Red Army, and disappeared during service in April 1945. | |
| April 1945 | Johann Stever | c. 55 | Germany | A German officer in the Heer branch of the Wehrmacht during World War II. Stever fell into the custody of the Red Army as the Russians advanced into Germany in 1945. He is believed to have died shortly thereafter. | |
| 18 April 1945 | Kurt von der Chevallerie | 53 | Kolberg, Germany | Chevallerie, a German Wehrmacht general during World War II who commanded the 1st Army from 4 June to 5 September 1944 and received the Knight's Cross of the Iron Cross with Oak Leaves, went missing in action near Kolberg on 18 April 1945, despite retiring from the army on 31 January. | |
| 21 April 1945 | Gustav Hundt | 50 | Opava, Czechoslovakia | A Wehrmacht general during World War II who commanded several divisions and received the Knight's Cross of the Iron Cross, Hundt disappeared near Opava, Czechoslovakia on 21 April 1945. He was declared dead on 7 June 1950 with the presumed date of death being the date of his disappearance. | |
| 21 April 1945 | Emil Stürtz | 52 | Berlin, Germany | A German Nazi Party Gauleiter of Brandenburg, Stürtz went missing on 21 April 1945 during the Battle of Berlin and was not seen again. It was assumed that he was captured by the Red Army and died in captivity. He was officially declared dead by the District Court of Düsseldorf on 24 August 1957, with an effective death date of 31 December 1945. | |
| 24 April 1945 | Günther Lützow | 32 | Schrobenhausen, Germany | A German Luftwaffe aviator and flying ace credited with over 110 enemy aircraft shot down in various conflicts, Lützow was part of the Jagdverband 44 when on 24 April 1945 he was reported missing in action while attempting to intercept an enemy bomber plane. His remains were never recovered. | |
| 25 April 1945 | Erich Hilgenfeldt | 47 | Berlin, Germany | High-ranking Nazi Party official Hilgenfeldt is thought to have died by suicide to avoid capture by the Allies, but his body was never found. | |
| 1 May 1945 | Santi Quasimodo | 58 | Brescia, Italy | An Italian Blackshirt general during World War II, Quasimodo disappeared in the Brescia area on 1 May 1945. His body was never found. | |
| 1 May 1945 | Heinrich Müller | 45 | Führerbunker, Berlin, Germany | Müller, a Nazi Gestapo chief, was last seen in the Führerbunker on the evening of 1 May 1945. While there he had stated that his intention was to avoid being taken into custody by the Soviet forces advancing on Berlin. His CIA file and related documents state that while the record is "...inconclusive on Müller's ultimate fate... [he] most likely died in Berlin in early May 1945." Other theories have suggested that he either escaped to South America like many other fugitive Nazis and lived out his life there (the Israelis continued to investigate his whereabouts into the 1960s) or was protected by U.S. or Soviet intelligence under a new identity. He is the most senior Nazi official whose fate is unknown. | |
| 2 May 1945 | Constanze Manziarly | 25 | Berlin, Germany | A cook and dietician for Adolf Hitler, Constanze Manziarly disappeared on 2 May 1945 after splitting up from two other women in the Soviet occupied area of Berlin. She was last seen being taken towards a U-Bahn subway tunnel by two Soviet soldiers and is believed to have been killed. | |
| 2 May 1945 | Joachim von Siegroth | 48 | Halbe, Germany | Siegroth, a general in the Wehrmacht of Nazi Germany during World War II and a recipient of the Knight's Cross of the Iron Cross, was listed as missing in action during the Battle of Halbe. | |
| 7 May 1945 | Hans Kammler | 44 | Ebensee, Austria | Kammler, an SS-Obergruppenführer and the head of German secret weapons program, was last seen on 4 May 1945 after separating from the rest of his convoy upon leaving the town of Ebensee, reportedly in order to reach Prague (as one of the last major German-controlled strongpoints), to where he previously ordered immediate transfer of his Ebensee office. The last confirmed heareance from him was on 7 May, when British intelligence intercepted a message in which he was asking the unit at the Leitmeritz concentration camp (a suspected V-3 production site), to report the arrival of his staff there. Various suspicions about his fate remain; that he had simply committed suicide by cyanide poisoning soon after that and upon realizing that he cannot evade capture, that he was ultimately killed by a gunshot from his aide in Prague in order to prevent his capture following an unsuccessful battling of a large attack by Czech resistance on his bunker, or that he was actually captured by the US troops back at Linz while en route to Prague and then transferred to United States via maximum security measures and in matters of complete secrecy (as a part of Operation Paperclip), where he remained until his death. To this day, Kammler remains as the highest-ranking SS-official whose fate remains unsolved. | |
| 8 May 1945 | Rafael Boban | 38 | Bleiburg, Austria | Rafael (also known as Ranko) Boban, a prominent figure of Croatian Ustaše party and military commander of Black Legion - the most well-known Ustaša unit, went missing after 8 May 1945 during retreat of Axis powers towards Austria, upon reportedly reaching the town of Bleiburg and unofficially disbaning the unit. From that point, numerous entirely different theories still exist about his ultimate fate; from that he was soon captured and executed by partisans following Bleiburg repatriations or killed in action while fighting as a Croatian guerrilla against Yugoslav state in 1947, all to his alleged emigration to Argentina or the United States via ratlines - where he reportedly even joined US Army and fought in Korean War. Believing that Boban is still alive, Ante Pavelić, the-then former leader of Ustaše, named him as Croatian minister of defence in-exile in 1951, despite the fact that he did not know about his whereabouts. To this day, Boban is the most senior member of Ustaše whose destiny (place and cause of death) remains entirely unclear. | |
| 13 May 1945 | Gustav Grachegg | 62 | Soviet Union | Grachegg, an Austrian equestrian who competed in the individual dressage event at the 1928 Summer Olympics, was reported to be missing in action during World War II. | |
| 15 May 1945 | Franjo Babić | 37 | Maribor, Slovenia | Croatian writer and journalist Babić attempted to flee to the Allies, but was presumably killed by Yugoslav Partisans near Dravograd. | |
| May 1945 | Walter Julius Bloem | 47 | Berlin, Germany | German writer and Waffen-SS soldier Bloem disappeared in May 1945 during the fighting surrounding Berlin. | |
| May 1945 | Hildegard Neumann | 26 | Germany | Neumann, a chief overseer at several Nazi concentration camps, transition camps and detention camps, disappeared in May 1945 after she left the Ravensbrück concentration camp. It is claimed that she died in 2010. | |
| 10 September 1945 | Rywka Lipszyc | 15 | Timmendorfer Strand, Schleswig-Holstein, Germany | 15-year-old Polish Holocaust survivor Rywka, a diarist who endured the Łódź Ghetto and the Auschwitz, Gross-Rosen and Bergen-Belsen camps, was registered as a patient at a hospital in Niendorf, Germany on September 10, 1945, after which time she disappeared from the public record. Her diary was published in 2014. | |
| 20 September 1945 | Flora Wovschin | 22 | North Korea | Wovschin was a strongly-suspected Soviet spy. Born in New York City, from 1943 to 1945, Wovschin worked in the Office of War Information before being transferred to the Department of State. While attending Barnard College in the early 1940s, she is known to have become acquainted with Judith Coplon, via whom she relayed national information to the Soviet intelligence agency. She later renounced her American citizenship and later relocated to the Soviet Union. Her ultimate fate remains unknown. | |
| 20 October 1945 | Alfred Partikel | 57 | Darß, Germany | A German painter, Partikel disappeared while picking mushrooms in the woods near Ahrenshoop. | |
| 19 December 1945 | Oto Iskandar di Nata | 48 | Tangerang, West Java, Indonesia | Indonesian politician Oto Iskandar di Nata is believed to have been abducted and murdered on a beach on 19 December 1945. His body was never found. | |
| 24 December 1945 | Maurice Sodder | 14 | Fayetteville, West Virginia, U.S. | Five of the nine Sodder children, aged 5 through 14, who lived in their parents' home, were presumed to have died in a fire that destroyed the house. However, no remains were found in the ashes the morning after the fire and some small bone fragments found during subsequent investigations turned out to have been planted. Later reported sightings of some of the children and suspicions that the fire had been arson rather than an accident led the family to believe that the children were still alive. The family kept a billboard offering a reward for information on their fate up at the house site until the late 1980s. | |
| 24 December 1945 | Martha Sodder | 12 | Fayetteville, West Virginia, U.S. | | |
| 24 December 1945 | Louis Sodder | 9 | Fayetteville, West Virginia, U.S. | | |
| 24 December 1945 | Jennie Sodder | 8 | Fayetteville, West Virginia, U.S. | | |
| 24 December 1945 | Betty Sodder | 5 | Fayetteville, West Virginia, U.S. | | |
| 1945 | Johnny Jebsen | 28 | Germany | Jebsen was an anti-Nazi German intelligence officer and British double agent (code name Artist) during the Second World War. Jebsen recruited Dušan Popov (who became the British agent Tricycle) to the Abwehr and through him later joined the Allied cause. Kidnapped from Lisbon by the Germans shortly before D-Day, Jebsen was tortured in prison and spent time in a concentration camp before disappearing, presumed killed, at the end of the war. | |
| April 1946 | Siegfried Engfer | 30–31 | Munich, Germany | A former Luftwaffe fighter pilot during World War II and recipient of the Knight's Cross of the Iron Cross of Nazi Germany, Engfer disappeared on a train journey from Vienna to Munich in April 1946. | |
| 27 November 1946 | Soeroto Koento | 24-25 | Warungbambu, Indonesia | An Indonesian military officer, Koento disappeared on 27 November 1946 the night after attending the Jakarta Defense Command meeting in Kedunggede. | |
| 1 December 1946 | Paula Jean Welden | 18 | Bennington, Vermont, U.S. | The Bennington College sophomore disappeared while walking on the Long Trail near Glastenbury Mountain. | |
| 9 April 1947 | Joan Gay Croft | 4 | Oklahoma City, Oklahoma, U.S. | In the aftermath of the Glazier–Higgins–Woodward tornadoes, 4-year-old Joan Gay Croft and her sister Jerri were among refugees taking shelter in a basement hallway of the Woodward hospital. As officials sent the injured to different hospitals in the area, two men took Joan away saying they were taking her to Oklahoma City. She was never seen again. Over the years, several women have come forth saying they suspect they might be Joan, but none of their claims have been verified. | |
| 1 May 1947 | Georgia Jean Weckler | 8 | Fort Atkinson, Wisconsin, U.S. | Weckler disappeared from near her home on the afternoon of 1 May 1947. She was last seen pausing to open the family mailbox. Witnesses reported seeing a dark-colored 1936 Ford sedan with a gray plastic spotlight in the vicinity on the afternoon of her disappearance. | |
| 1 June 1948 | Virginia Carpenter | 21 | Denton, Texas, U.S. | Carpenter, a college student, was last seen by a taxi driver around 9:30 p.m on 1 June 1948. Despite extensive efforts to find her and tips being submitted as recently as 1998, Carpenter has never been found. | |
| 7 October 1949 | Jean Spangler | 26 | Los Angeles, California, U.S. | Aspiring actress Spangler went missing under mysterious circumstances. She left her home in Los Angeles after telling her sister-in-law that she was going to meet with her ex-husband before going to work as an extra on a film set. She was last seen at a grocery store several blocks from her home at approximately 6:00 pm. Two days later Spangler's tattered purse was discovered in a remote area of Griffith Park approximately 5.5 miles (8.9 km) from her home. She left a note addressed to "Kirk". Police ruled out a connection to the actor Kirk Douglas. Also ruled out was her ex-husband, but other theories included an illegal abortion that resulted in her death and a connection with gangsters. | |
| 18 October 1949 | Dorothy Forstein | 40 | Pennsylvania, U.S. | American housewife Forstein disappeared in Pennsylvania on 18 October 1949. Her two children reported seeing an unknown man carrying Dorothy over his shoulder downstairs and she was never seen again. | |
| 1949 | Francis Hong Yong-ho | 43 | North Korea | Hong Yong-ho, a Roman Catholic prelate, was imprisoned by the communist regime of Kim Il Sung in 1949. He was never seen again. | |

== 1950s ==
| Date | Person(s) | Age | Missing from | Circumstances | Refs. |
|---|---|---|---|---|---|
| 14 January 1950 | Richard Colvin Cox | 21 | West Point, New York, U.S. | A second-year military cadet, Cox disappeared from the United States Military Academy at West Point, New York after he met an unknown man, known as "George", three times over the course of a week. On the third occasion, Cox and "George" left the grounds of the academy and were never seen again. | |
| January 1950 | Raymond Maufrais | 23 | Jungle of French Guiana, South America | Raymond Maufrais was a French explorer and journalist. He disappeared in the jungle of French Guiana in January 1950 and was never seen again. | |
| 2 December 1950 | James E. Johnson | 24 | Chosin Reservoir, North Korea | A sergeant in the United States Army and veteran of two campaigns in the Pacific, Johnson was presumably killed in combat while providing covering fire for his wounded comrades. His remains were never recovered, and he was posthumously awarded the Medal of Honor for his valiant actions. | |
| January 1951 | Ram Prasad Rai | 41–42 | Tibet | Rai was a major figure in the Nepali Revolution of 1951. After Rai fled to Tibet in January of that year he was never seen again and is presumed to have been killed by Government forces, while he was in the caves. | |
| 19 April 1951 | Vincent Mangano | 63 | New York, U.S. | A mafia crime boss of the Mangano crime family (the future Gambino crime family), Vincent Mangano disappeared on the same day that his brother Philip Mangano was found murdered. They are believed to have been murdered on the orders of Albert Anastasia as part of a coup. | |
| 25 April 1951 | Charles L. Gilliland | 17 | Tongmang-ni, South Korea | Gilliland, a United States Army soldier, was presumably killed after providing covering fire for fellow soldiers from Chinese forces. He was posthumously awarded the Medal of Honor, the youngest recipient of the award. | |
| 24 August 1951 | Beverly Potts | 10 | Cleveland, Ohio, U.S. | Potts, an American schoolgirl, disappeared while walking home from an entertainment event at Halloran Park. She is believed by police to have been abducted and murdered, possibly by someone she knew and trusted as she was shy and fearful of strangers. | |
| 15 March 1952 | John Robert Baldwin | 33 | Korea | RAF fighter pilot and high scoring flying ace Baldwin went missing during secondment service with the USAAF in the Korean War and is presumed to have been killed. | |
| 16 July 1952 | Constance Christine "Connie" Smith | 10 | Salisbury, Connecticut, United States | American schoolgirl Smith, the granddaughter of Wyoming governor Nels H. Smith, walked away from Camp Sloane near Salisbury, Connecticut after she had an altercation with other campers. She was last seen walking along U.S. Route 44, at the intersection of U.S. Route 44 and Belgo Road near Salisbury. Despite an extensive search, her disappearance has never been solved. | |
| 1 November 1952 | Victor Harold Travis | 42 | Adams County, Wisconsin, U.S. | Travis disappeared and was never seen again. | |
| 1953 | Rudolf Mildner | 50–51 | Germany | Mildner was an Austrian-German SS-Standartenführer who served as the chief of the Gestapo at Katowice and also was the head of the political department at Auschwitz. After the war Mildner testified at the Nuremberg Trials and remained in custody until 1949. It is believed that his disappearance was intentional, to avoid prosecution, and that he died in 1953. Adolf Eichmann claimed to have met Mildner in Argentina in 1958 but this claim has not been verified. | |
| 19 April 1953 | Ronald Tammen | 19 | Oxford, Ohio, U.S. | Tammen, a student at Miami University, left his Fisher Hall room at approximately 8 p.m. on 19 April 1953 to get new bed sheets from the Hall manager because a prankster had put a fish in his bed. Tammen took the sheets and returned to his dorm room to study psychology, which was the last time he was definitely seen. At 10:30, Tammen's roommate returned to find Tammen's psychology book lying open on his desk and all the room lights on, but Tammen was not there. When Tammen failed to return the following day, a search began. To this day, Tammen's fate remains unknown. | |
| 11 June 1953 | Clem Graver | Unknown | Chicago, Illinois, U.S. | Graver, a politician in Illinois who served as a state representative, was escorted away from his home by men after pulling up on his driveway and was never seen again. | |
| 13 July 1953 | Henry Borynski | 42 | Bradford, England | Borynski, a Polish Catholic priest and outspoken anti-Communist, disappeared on 13 July 1953 in Bradford, Yorkshire when he left his residence following a phone call. | |
| c. September 1953 | Carlett Brown Angianlee | 25–26 | United States | A United States Navy veteran during the 1950s who may have been the first African American to undergo gender affirmation surgery. Angianlee disappeared at a time she had been planning to travel to Europe to undergo such surgery. It is unknown if she travelled there to undergo the required operations, as her movements from approximately September 1953 are unknown. | |
| 24 October 1953 | Evelyn Hartley | 15 | La Crosse, Wisconsin, U.S. | Hartley disappeared from a neighbor's home while babysitting, and was never seen or heard from again. | |
| 23 November 1953 | Felix Moncla | 27 | Lake Superior, U.S. | Pilot First Lieutenant Felix Moncla along with Second Lieutenant Robert Wilson, radar operator, disappeared when their United States Air Force F-89 Scorpion was scrambled from Kincheloe Air Force Base, and subsequently went missing over Lake Superior, while intercepting an unknown aircraft in Canadian airspace close to the Canada–United States border. The USAF claimed the second aircraft was Royal Canadian Air Force C-47 Dakota VC-912, crossing Northern Lake Superior from west to east at 7,000 feet en route from Winnipeg, Manitoba, to Sudbury, Ontario. The RCAF stated it had no record of such an incident. | |
| 23 November 1953 | Robert Wilson | 22 | Lake Superior, U.S. | | |
| June 1954 | James Walsh | 32 | United States | James Walsh and his wife lived near Ed Gein when he disappeared in June 1954. | |
| 13 August 1954 | Haji Sulong | 58–59 | Songkhla, Thailand | A Thai separatist who advocated for greater autonomy for the Jawi community in the country, Haji Sulong disappeared after he was ordered to go to the Songkhla Police Station, and was not seen again. | |
| 1955 | Stanley Mathenge | 35–36 | Kenya | Mathenge, a Mau Mau leader who disappeared in 1955, was later alleged to be living in Ethiopia, but has not been seen since. | |
| 19 July 1955 | Weldon Kees | 41 | Marin County, California, U.S. | Kees was an American poet, painter, literary critic, novelist, playwright, jazz pianist, short story writer, and filmmaker who went missing. On 19 July 1955 a car owned by Weldon Kees was discovered on the Marin County side of the Golden Gate Bridge. While Kees had talked about jumping over the railing of the bridge, he stated that he was physically unable to accomplish the task. | |
| 31 October 1955 | Steven Damman | 2 | East Meadow, New York, U.S. | Steven Damman, a two-year-old boy, went missing outside a grocery store along with his seven-month old sister. His sister was found several blocks away unharmed, but Steven's whereabouts remain unknown. | |
| 12 March 1956 | Jesús Galíndez | 40 | Manhattan, New York City, U.S. | Galíndez, a Spanish politician and Basque nationalist, disappeared in New York City on 12 March 1956. He is thought to have been kidnapped and murdered by Dominican security agents on the orders of Rafael Trujillo, though his body has never been located. | |
| c. 22 May 1956 | Gunnel Gummeson | 25–26 | Sheberghan, Jowzjan Province, Afghanistan | Swedish school teacher Gummeson and her American fiancé Winant were last seen in the city of Sheberghan in northern Afghanistan. Two investigations have been carried out, but both were hampered by official corruption and codes of loyalty to clan chiefs. | |
| c. 22 May 1956 | Peter Winant | Unknown | Sheberghan, Jowzjan Province, Afghanistan | Swedish school teacher Gummeson and her American fiancé Winant were last seen in the city of Sheberghan in northern Afghanistan. Two investigations have been carried out, but both were hampered by official corruption and codes of loyalty to clan chiefs. | |
| 23 March 1957 | Thomas Eldon Bowman | 8 | Altadena, California, U.S. | A possible victim of serial killer Mack Ray Edwards. Bowman was last seen walking with family members on a trail in Arroyo Cinco Canyon on 23 March 1957. | |
| After 1957 | Bob Lymburne | At least 48 | Canada | Lymburne represented Canada at the 1932 Winter Olympics in ski-jumping. Three years later, while training, he suffered a head injury. After 1957, he wandered into the woods and was not seen again. | |
| 21 November 1958 | Adele Marie Wells | 7 | Flint, Michigan, U.S. | Wells disappeared in Flint, Michigan on 21 November 1958, when she was seven years old. She had stayed home from school that morning due to a cold, and was last seen leaving her grandmother's house that afternoon. Wells is believed to have been abducted. | |

== 1960s ==
| Date | Person(s) | Age | Missing from | Circumstances | Refs. |
|---|---|---|---|---|---|
| 12 July 1960 | Bruce Kremen | 6 | Los Angeles, California, U.S. | Last seen camping with a group of approximately 80 children and adults in the Angeles National Forest in California on 12 July 1960. Kremen was last seen playing with other children close to the campsite. His body has never been discovered. | |
| 25 November 1960 | Walter Broschat | 9 | Pirmasens, West Germany | The first of the three missing children of Pirmasens. All are suspected to have been murdered by an unidentified serial killer; all three children were never found. | |
| April 1961 | Masanobu Tsuji | 59 | Laos | Tsuji, a politician and former Imperial Japanese Army officer, disappeared on a trip to Laos. | |
| 18 August 1961 | Karen Lynn Tompkins | 11 | Torrance, California, U.S. | Tompkins disappeared while walking the four blocks from a summer arts and crafts class at Halldale Avenue Elementary School to her family home on the afternoon of 18 August 1961. Her body has never been discovered. | |
| 31 August 1961 | Ann Marie Burr | 8 | Tacoma, Washington, U.S. | Burr disappeared from her home in the middle of the night on 31 August 1961 while sleeping in an upstairs room with her 3-year-old sister. Law enforcement have theorized that serial killer Ted Bundy, then 14 years old, was responsible for her abduction, as he resided in the same neighborhood. Bundy denied involvement, however, and a 2011 DNA analysis was inconclusive. | |
| 24 October 1961 | Joan Risch | 31 | Lincoln, Massachusetts, U.S. | Risch was last seen in her driveway by a neighbor, and several unconfirmed sightings were reported on local roads later that day. Evidence in her house at first suggested foul play, but that opinion was reassessed when a local newspaper found that she had checked out two dozen books about mysterious disappearances and unsolved murders from the library over the preceding summer. | |
| 19 November 1961 | Michael Rockefeller | 23 | Netherlands New Guinea (modern-day West Papua, Indonesia) | Michael, the son of New York Governor and future Vice-president Nelson Rockefeller, disappeared during an expedition in the Asmat region of southwestern Netherlands New Guinea (currently in Papua). | |
| 8 April 1962 | Anthony Strollo | 62 | Fort Lee, New Jersey, U.S. | A caporegime in the Genovese crime family, Strollo was last seen leaving his residence in Fort Lee, New Jersey. He is believed to have been murdered on the orders of Vito Genovese in retaliation for having conspired to have Genovese imprisoned for drug trafficking. No one was ever charged in his disappearance. | |
| 30 May 1962 | Archie E. Mitchell | 44 | South Vietnam | Mitchell, a minister, Vietti, a doctor, working with the Christian and Missionary Alliance, and Gerber, a leprosarium worker serving with the Mennonite Central Committee, were taken captive by the Viet Cong on 30 May 1962. What became of them after that is unknown. | |
| 30 May 1962 | Eleanor Ardel Vietti | 34 | South Vietnam | Mitchell, a minister, Vietti, a doctor, working with the Christian and Missionary Alliance, and Gerber, a leprosarium worker serving with the Mennonite Central Committee, were taken captive by the Viet Cong on 30 May 1962. What became of them after that is unknown. | |
| 30 May 1962 | Daniel A. Gerber | 21 | South Vietnam | Mitchell, a minister, Vietti, a doctor, working with the Christian and Missionary Alliance, and Gerber, a leprosarium worker serving with the Mennonite Central Committee, were taken captive by the Viet Cong on 30 May 1962. What became of them after that is unknown. | |
| 1962 | Sam Sary | 45 | Cambodia | A Cambodian politician, Sam Sary disappeared in 1962 and may have been put to death. | |
| 29 October 1963 | Jill Rosenthal | 2 days | Atlantic City, New Jersey | Rosenthal disappeared on 29 October 1963, two days after her birth. Her twin brother, Jack, also disappeared in 1965. He was raised under a false identity, and his true identity was only discovered in 2019. Investigators believe there is a strong possibility Jill is still alive, having also been raised under a pseudonym. | |
| 17 January 1964 | Klaus-Dieter Stark | 9 | Pirmasens, West Germany | The second of the three missing children of Pirmasens. Stark disappeared while walking home from school; his body was never found. He is suspected to have been murdered by an unidentified serial killer. | |
| 10 July 1964 | Joe Gaetjens | 40 | Port-au-Prince, Haiti | Gaetjens, a Haitian-American soccer player, was arrested by Haiti's Tonton Macoutes secret police on the morning of 8 July 1964 and taken to Fort Dimanche prison, where it is presumed he was killed on 10 July. His body has never been found. | |
| 12 August 1964 | Charles Clifford Ogle | 41 | Sierra Nevada Mountains, California, U.S. | Ogle took off from Oakland International Airport in his Cessna 210, a single-engine aircraft, and is believed to have been heading over the Sierra Nevada when he disappeared. | |
| 11 October 1964 | Reed Jeppson | 15 | Salt Lake City, Utah, U.S. | Jeppson disappeared along with his two dogs while taking them for a walk. His sister believes that he was kidnapped. | |
| 29 April 1965 | Charles Shelton | 33 | Laos | Shelton, a United States Air Force officer, was shot down over Laos while on a reconnaissance mission during the Vietnam War. He was last heard from when he sent a radio report that he had escaped by parachute. He was classified as a prisoner of war until 1994, making him the last official U.S. prisoner of war from the Vietnam War. | |
| 8 May 1965 | Carl R. Disch | 26 | Byrd Station, Antarctica | Disch, an American ionospheric scientist, vanished while travelling to the main station complex of Byrd Station from radio noise building. Despite search parties spotting his tracks and attempts to make the station more visible, Disch was never found. | |
| 29 July 1965 | Kjell-Åke Johansson | 16 | Gothenburg, Sweden | Kjell-Åke Johansson, Jan Olof Dahlsjö, and Gay Roger Karlsson were last seen driving off in a Volvo PV444 from a café in Haga, Gothenburg on 29 July 1965. On the same day, art student Hübner "Hymme" Lundqvist (son of Evert Lundquist) was last reported alive through a postcard sent by him at Gothenburg Central Station. Lundqvist is believed to have hitchhiked with the Dahlsjö trio. | |
| 29 July 1965 | Hübner "Hymme" Lundqvist | 18 | Gothenburg, Sweden | Kjell-Åke Johansson, Jan Olof Dahlsjö, and Gay Roger Karlsson were last seen driving off in a Volvo PV444 from a café in Haga, Gothenburg on 29 July 1965. On the same day, art student Hübner "Hymme" Lundqvist (son of Evert Lundquist) was last reported alive through a postcard sent by him at Gothenburg Central Station. Lundqvist is believed to have hitchhiked with the Dahlsjö trio. | |
| 29 July 1965 | Jan Olof Dahlsjö | 21 | Gothenburg, Sweden | Kjell-Åke Johansson, Jan Olof Dahlsjö, and Gay Roger Karlsson were last seen driving off in a Volvo PV444 from a café in Haga, Gothenburg on 29 July 1965. On the same day, art student Hübner "Hymme" Lundqvist (son of Evert Lundquist) was last reported alive through a postcard sent by him at Gothenburg Central Station. Lundqvist is believed to have hitchhiked with the Dahlsjö trio. | |
| 29 July 1965 | Gay Roger Karlsson | 22 | Gothenburg, Sweden | Kjell-Åke Johansson, Jan Olof Dahlsjö, and Gay Roger Karlsson were last seen driving off in a Volvo PV444 from a café in Haga, Gothenburg on 29 July 1965. On the same day, art student Hübner "Hymme" Lundqvist (son of Evert Lundquist) was last reported alive through a postcard sent by him at Gothenburg Central Station. Lundqvist is believed to have hitchhiked with the Dahlsjö trio. | |
| 29 October 1965 | Mehdi Ben Barka | 45 | Paris, France | Moroccan politician Mehdi Ben Barka disappeared while in exile in Paris where he is believed to have been killed and buried. | |
| 1 November 1965 | Bakri Wahab | Unknown | Salatiga, Indonesia | Bakri Wahab was a former Mayor of Salatiga and a member of PKI who was arrested on 1 November 1965. Since then, his fate remains unknown. | |
| c. 1 December 1965 | Muhammad Arief | 60-61 | Banyuwangi, Indonesia | An Indonesian angklung musician, politician, and songwriter. Arief disappeared shortly after the 30 September Movement. He is believed to have been executed, although his body has never been found. | |
| 1966 | Moerachman | 36–37 | Surabaya, Indonesia | Moerachman was an Indonesian politician. After being captured and sent to the Kalisosok Prison in Surabaya, he was never seen again after being removed from his cell in 1966. There is a very high chance that he was executed. | |
| 1966 | Kim Bong-han | 49–50 | North Korea | The North Korean medical surgeon disappeared in 1966. | |
| 26 January 1966 | Jane Nartare Beaumont | 9 | Adelaide, Australia | The Beaumont children – Jane Nartare, Arnna Kathleen, and Grant Ellis – disappeared from a beach near Adelaide and have not been seen since. | |
| 26 January 1966 | Arnna Kathleen Beaumont | 7 | Adelaide, Australia | The Beaumont children – Jane Nartare, Arnna Kathleen, and Grant Ellis – disappeared from a beach near Adelaide and have not been seen since. | |
| 26 January 1966 | Grant Ellis Beaumont | 4 | Adelaide, Australia | The Beaumont children – Jane Nartare, Arnna Kathleen, and Grant Ellis – disappeared from a beach near Adelaide and have not been seen since. | |
| 13 March 1966 | Susan Pearson | 30 | Missoula, Montana, U.S. | A graduate student and instructor at the University of Montana, Pearson disappeared days before she was due to submit her doctoral thesis. Her abandoned car was discovered in downtown Missoula. Her whereabouts remain unknown. | |
| 9 June 1966 | Wikana | 51 | Jakarta, Indonesia | Wikana, an Indonesian Communist Party leader, disappeared on 9 June. He was allegedly murdered as part of the Indonesian mass killings of 1965–1966. | |
| 29 June 1966 | Anak Agung Bagus Suteja | 43 | Jakarta, Indonesia | A former governor of Bali was last seen on 29 June 1966 when four soldiers visited his house in Jakarta and asked him to meet an infantry colonel. He later said goodbye to his family, and since then, he has never been seen again. His fate remains unknown until present. | |
| 2 July 1966 | Ann Miller | 19 | Indiana Dunes State Park, Indiana, U.S. | Miller, Blough, and Bruhl, three young women from the Chicago suburbs, were last seen after leaving their blanket and personal effects behind on a crowded beach to get on a boat in Lake Michigan. Theories have ranged from an offshore illegal abortion gone wrong, resulting in the other two women being killed as witnesses, to a hit ordered by Silas Jayne, a Chicago-area horse breeder implicated after his 1987 death in a number of unsolved murders related to a bitter feud with his brother. | |
| 2 July 1966 | Patricia Blough | 19 | Indiana Dunes State Park, Indiana, U.S. | Miller, Blough, and Bruhl, three young women from the Chicago suburbs, were last seen after leaving their blanket and personal effects behind on a crowded beach to get on a boat in Lake Michigan. Theories have ranged from an offshore illegal abortion gone wrong, resulting in the other two women being killed as witnesses, to a hit ordered by Silas Jayne, a Chicago-area horse breeder implicated after his 1987 death in a number of unsolved murders related to a bitter feud with his brother. | |
| 2 July 1966 | Renee Bruhl | 21 | Indiana Dunes State Park, Indiana, U.S. | Miller, Blough, and Bruhl, three young women from the Chicago suburbs, were last seen after leaving their blanket and personal effects behind on a crowded beach to get on a boat in Lake Michigan. Theories have ranged from an offshore illegal abortion gone wrong, resulting in the other two women being killed as witnesses, to a hit ordered by Silas Jayne, a Chicago-area horse breeder implicated after his 1987 death in a number of unsolved murders related to a bitter feud with his brother. | |
| September 1966 | Chu Anping | 56 | China | Chinese scholar and liberal journalist Chu Anping disappeared in September 1966. | |
| 26 March 1967 | Jim Thompson | 61 | Cameron Highlands, Malaysia | Thompson, a former U.S. military intelligence officer who once worked for the Office of Strategic Services (and later known as the "Thai Silk King" for his revival of the Thai silk industry), failed to return from an afternoon walk in the Cameron Highlands in Pahang, Malaysia, quickly prompting an extensive manhunt. No trace of him has ever been found. | |
| 26 April 1967 | Michael J. Estocin | 35 | Haiphong, North Vietnam (presumed) | A United States Navy officer and Medal of Honor recipient, Estocin was last seen on 26 April 1967. He is believed to have either died as a prisoner of war after his aircraft was downed over Haiphong, North Vietnam, or to have died in the crash of his plane. | |
| 7 June 1967 | James P. Brady | 59 | Saskatchewan, Canada | Brady, a Canadian Metis leader, and Cree friend Abraham Halkett disappeared while on a prospecting trip in northern Saskatchewan. An extensive land, air, and water search located their camp but failed to find any trace of either man. | |
| 7 June 1967 | Abraham Halkett | 40 | Saskatchewan, Canada | Brady, a Canadian Metis leader, and Cree friend Abraham Halkett disappeared while on a prospecting trip in northern Saskatchewan. An extensive land, air, and water search located their camp but failed to find any trace of either man. | |
| c. 1 July 1967 | Oetomo Ramelan | 48 | Indonesia | A former Mayor of Surakarta. Ramelan was known as the only Mayor of Surakarta who came from the Indonesian Communist Party (PKI). He was sentenced to death by the Extraordinary Military Court (Mahmilub) on 22 June 1967 and is believed to have been executed shortly thereafter. | |
| 8 September 1967 | Eveline Lübbert | 10 | Pirmasens, West Germany | The final of the three missing children of Pirmasens. Lübbert was last seen close to the Pirmasens Exhibition Centre. Her body was never found. | |
| 10 December 1967 | John Lake | 37 | New York City, New York, U.S. | The sports editor of Newsweek, Lake mysteriously disappeared on 10 December 1967, last seen heading for the subway after work. | |
| 17 December 1967 | Harold Holt | 59 | Portsea, Victoria, Australia | Harold Holt, the Prime Minister of Australia, disappeared while swimming in the sea near Portsea, Victoria on 17 December 1967. An enormous search operation was mounted in and around Cheviot Beach, but his body was never recovered. | |
| 1968 | Eugene DeBruin | 34–35 | Pathet Lao, Laos | DeBruin, a United States Air Force staff sergeant and member of Air America, was serving in Laos during the Second Indochina War. He was captured when his plane was shot down in 1963. After that he was a POW at a Pathet Lao prison camp in Laos until 1968 when he and other prisoners attempted to escape. Following the escape attempt he disappeared and it is not known if he succeeded or what became of him. | |
| November 1968 | Hryhoriy Tymenko | 23 | Ukrainian SSR | A Ukrainian poet and Samizdat representative, Hryhoriy Tymenko disappeared without a trace in November 1968, and has not been seen since. | |
| 8 April 1969 | April Fabb | 13 | Metton, Norfolk, England | Fabb was last seen near her home in Metton, Norfolk, United Kingdom. Her abandoned bicycle was later found in a field. No trace of her has been found since, although some theories have linked her case to known serial killers. | |
| 5 June 1969 | Isabella Skelton | 35 | Crumpsall, Manchester, England | Skelton disappeared from her home in the Crumpsall area of Manchester, England. | |
| 14 June 1969 | Dennis Martin | 6 | Great Smoky Mountains National Park, Tennessee, U.S. | Martin vanished in the Great Smoky Mountains National Park and has not been seen since. | |
| 31 October 1969 | Patricia Spencer | 16 | Oscoda, Michigan, U.S. | Spencer and Hobley were last seen leaving a Halloween party together. Police have continued to investigate and believe the two were murdered, and in 2013 they announced they had a person of interest in the case but did not have enough information to continue. | |
| 31 October 1969 | Pamela Hobley | 15 | Oscoda, Michigan, U.S. | Spencer and Hobley were last seen leaving a Halloween party together. Police have continued to investigate and believe the two were murdered, and in 2013 they announced they had a person of interest in the case but did not have enough information to continue. | |
| 11 December 1969 | 11 passengers and crew of Korean Air Lines YS-11 | Various; ranging from 23 to 49 | South Korean airspace | 51 passengers and crew were on board a NAMC YS-11 operated by Korean Air Lines flying from Gangneung to Gimpo Airport when one of the passengers went up to the cockpit and ordered the pilot to fly the plane to Pyongyang. While most of the passengers were eventually released through the Joint Security Area at Panmunjom, all four crew and 7 of the passengers have never been repatriated to this day. | |
| 18 December 1969 | Carmen Marie Hallock | 22 | Broward Community College, Florida | Twenty-two-year-old Carmen Marie Hallock disappeared and was never seen again. She is a suspected victim of serial killer Gerard John Schaefer. | |
| 29 December 1969 | Peggy C. Rahn | 9 | Pompano Beach, Florida, U.S. | Nine-year-old Peggy C. Rahn and 8-year-old Wendy Brown Stevenson disappeared in Pompano Beach, Florida on 29 December 1969. Rahn and Stevenson were last seen in the company of a man who bought them ice cream cones in the beach parking lot. One suspect in the girls' disappearances was serial child molester Kenneth Guy Shilts; Rahn's and Stevenson's names were reportedly listed in an entry in Shilts's notebook. In 1973, serial killer Gerard John Schaefer was accused of murdering Rahn and Stevenson; he initially denied involvement, though later confessed in 1989. Schaefer was never charged in connection with the disappearances of Rahn and Stevenson. | |
| 29 December 1969 | Wendy Brown Stevenson | 8 | Pompano Beach, Florida, U.S. | | |

== See also ==
- List of fugitives from justice who disappeared
- List of kidnappings
- List of murder convictions without a body
- List of people who disappeared mysteriously (pre-1910)
- List of people who disappeared mysteriously (1970s)
- List of people who disappeared mysteriously (1980s)
- List of people who disappeared mysteriously (1990s)
- List of people who disappeared mysteriously (2000–present)
- Lists of solved missing person cases
- List of unsolved deaths
