= Bakri Wahab =

Indonesian politician

Mayor of Salatiga
- In office 1961 – 1 November 1965
- Governor: Mochtar
- Preceded by: Soewandi Martosoewojo
- Succeeded by: Soegiman

Personal details
- Party: PKI

Bakri Wahab was an Indonesian politician, belonging to the Communist Party of Indonesia (PKI). Bakri Wahab was the mayor of Salatiga 1961-1966.

== Life ==
A Pekalongan origin, Wahab became the Mayor of Salatiga in 1961, replacing Soewandi Martosoewojo. He was a PKI member.

After the 30 September Movement incident, Wahab was arrested on 1 November 1965, and his fate was unknown.

== See also ==
- List of people who disappeared mysteriously: 1910–1990
