= Disappearance of Pearl Turner =

1923 missing child case in Arkansas, United States

Pearl Turner
- Born: October 10, 1920
- Disappeared: October 19, 1923 (aged 3) home in the mountains of West-Central Arkansas
- Status: Missing for 102 years, 11 months and 2 days
- Known for: Mysterious disappearance
- Parents: Lynn Turner (father); Lela Turner (mother)

Pearl Turner was a three-year-old American child who disappeared from the garden of her family cabin in the White Oak Mountain district of Scott County, Arkansas on October 19, 1923. Despite intense nationwide publicity and repeated efforts to locate the girl, Turner has never been located. Her ultimate fate remains unknown.

== Disappearance ==
In the fall of 1923 on a Friday while Pearl's parents were camping, Pearl had wandered away into the wilderness. Hundreds of people from nearby towns searched for her for many weeks but to no avail. She is believed by some people to have been kidnapped.

== Aftermath ==
Pearl's disappearance has had books published, and missing persons YouTube videos made about it.

== See also ==
- List of people who disappeared mysteriously (1910–1970)
