= Disappearance of Dorothy Forstein =

Unsolved missing person case

Dorothy Forstein
- Born: Dorothy Cooper; 1909; United States
- Disappeared: October 18, 1949 (age 40)
- Status: Missing for 76 years and 5 months
- Height: 5 ft 2 in (1.57 m)
- Spouse: Jules Forstein
- Children: 3

Dorothy "Dora" Forstein (born Dorothy Cooper, 1909) was an American woman who went missing after being last seen at her Philadelphia home on October 18, 1949.

== Disappearance ==
On the night of October 18, 1949, Dorothy's husband, magistrate Jules Forstein, left home for the evening. He later called Dorothy and told her that he would not arrive home until late. When he returned home, he was very surprised to find his two children, Edward and Marcy, clinging together in a bedroom.

They were both crying "Mommy's gone!" Marcy told her father that roughly 15 minutes prior, she had been woken by a noise and had gone downstairs, where she had seen a middle-aged man in a brown, peaked cap carrying her unconscious mother down the stairs over his shoulder. When she asked him what he was doing, he patted her head and told her, "Go back to sleep, little one. Your mom is fine." He then left and locked the door.

== Investigation ==
Police initially doubted Marcy's story, but believed it after a psychiatrist interviewed her and confirmed she was apparently telling the truth. The theory first posited by police was that someone with a grudge against her husband due to his job had targeted her. This was seen as most likely given that five years previously, a home intruder had stolen nothing but had severely assaulted Dorothy. On this occasion, too, nothing was stolen from the house. No fingerprints were left behind by the intruder, nor were there any signs of forced entry, just as in the previous assault.

A large search was conducted to find Forstein, as the police asked for a check of all unidentified women and requested reports from hospitals (including mental hospitals), hotels, morgues and convalescent homes all across the country. Captain James Kelly of Philadelphia's detective bureau sent out 10,000 notices to police departments and institutions with the description of Forstein.

== See also ==
- List of kidnappings (1900–1949)
- List of people who disappeared mysteriously (1910–1970)
