= Ilya Timofeyevich Osipov =

Soviet Tatar pontonier (1922–1944)

- Илья Тимофеевич Осипов
- Born: 1922; Sarykovo village, Altai Governorate, RSFSR
- Died: January 1944 (aged 21–22)
- Military career
- Branch: Red Army
- Service years: 1941–1944
- Rank: Red Army Soldier
- Units: 6th Pontoon Bridge Brigade; 40th Army
- Conflicts: World War II; Battle of the Dnieper
- Awards: Hero of the Soviet Union; Order of Lenin; Order of the Red Star; Medal "For Courage"

Ilya Timofeyevich Osipov (Russian: Илья́ Тимофе́евич О́сипов; 1922 – January 1944) was a Tatar Red Army soldier and posthumous Hero of the Soviet Union. Osipov was awarded the title for his work with pontoon bridges during the Battle of the Dnieper, but went missing in January 1944.

== Early life ==
Osipov was born in 1922 in Sarykovo village in Altai Governorate to a peasant family. He graduated from five grades in Tayna village in Krasnogorsky District. After his parents died, he lived with his older sister in Turochak village. Osipov graduated from eighth grade in the Gorno-Altaisk National School. He worked as a lumberjack on the Lebyazhinskom State Farm.

== World War II ==
In December 1941, Osipov was drafted into the Red Army. He fought in combat from September 1942. Osipov became a pontonier in the 134th Separate Motorized Pontoon-Bridge Battalion. The battalion became part of the 6th Pontoon Bridge Brigade of the 40th Army in March 1943. In August, he fought in the Belgorod-Khar'kov Offensive Operation. On 27 August, the battalion was involved in the crossing of the Vorskla River during the Lower Dnieper Offensive. It was necessary to build a pontoon bridge to enable heavy tanks to cross the river in the Akhtyrka-Detgorodok area. Osipov reportedly spent ten hours in the water constructing the bridge, despite German bombing raids. Between 28 and 29 August, Osipov reportedly led a group of soldiers in the area of Zhuravne and Buymerovka in installing bridge supports in the water. For these actions, Osipov was recommended by his battalion commander for the Order of the Red Star, but this was downgraded to the Medal "For Courage", which Osipov received on 11 September.

The 40th Army continued its advance and reached the Dnieper by late September. On 25 September, Osipov and a group of soldiers built a jetty under enemy fire to ferry tanks and artillery across the river near the village of Balyko-Shchuchynka in Kaharlyk Raion. Osipov reportedly was first to start constructing the jetty and set the underwater base of jetty while working for more than 2.5 hours. On 29 September, he reportedly spent 3 hours in the water helping to salvage a ferry that had been sunk by German fire. He was awarded the Order of the Red Star for his actions on 5 October. Afterwards, Osipov reportedly made 15 trips a day to reinforce the bridgehead on the Dnieper.

Osipov continued to fight with his unit. On 10 January 1944, Osipov was awarded the title Hero of the Soviet Union and the Order of Lenin. However, he was reported missing sometime during the month, probably during the Battle of the Korsun–Cherkassy Pocket.

== See also ==
- List of people who disappeared
