= Carlett Brown Angianlee =

Intersex veteran

- Born: Charles Brown c. 1927; Pittsburgh, Pennsylvania, U.S.
- Disappeared: c. September 1953
- Known for: Possible first African American to undergo gender affirmation surgery

Carlett Brown Angianlee (born c. 1927) was a United States Navy veteran during the 1950s who, if she made it to Europe, was the first African American to undergo gender affirmation surgery.

== Biography ==
From Pittsburgh, Angianlee was born c. 1927 as Charles Brown. She joined the Navy in 1950 to be able to receive treatment for rectal and nasal bleeding. While serving, she was diagnosed at the US Naval Hospital in Philadelphia for what was described as "a serious mental illness", wanting to be female. The examinations also led to the discovery of "female glands," showing that Carlett was intersex. Opposing the doctor's recommendation to have them surgically removed, Carlett decided instead to seek out a different type of surgery, sex reassignment surgery.

Angianlee began writing to surgeons in Germany, Denmark, and Yugoslavia to see about getting sex reassignment surgery. Dr. Christian Hamburger responded, telling her citizenship was needed to have it done in Denmark. She wrote to West Germany’s Minister of Justice Dr. Thomas Dehler and was told the same. At some point, she arranged to gain citizenship and for the surgery to occur in Bonn, Germany, starting with hormone and cortisone injections. Part of her desire to transition stemmed from her desire to marry Sgt. Eugene Martin, who was stationed in Germany at the time. Claiming a two and a half year relationship with the man, she said that "We’ll be married as soon as I am legally a woman." Once out of the navy, she moved to Boston where she made a living by working as a shake dancer and by selling her blood and plasma.

Between June 18 and 25, 1953, Angianlee legally changed her name to Carlett Brown Angianlee, who was stationed in Germany. She had renounced her American citizenship and planned to sail to Europe on the SS Holland on August 2. Once there, she had planned doctors' appointments to begin her transition. About a month later, Agianlee made the decision to postpone the trip in order to undergo a $500 face lift in New York City from Dr. George J.B. Weiss. Within the following month, she was ordered not to leave the country by the US government until she had paid $1,200 in back taxes. To make more money to be able to pay this off, she got a job as a cook at an Iowa State College fraternity. Nothing beyond this point is known about her, and it is unknown if she ever made it to Europe.

== See also ==
- Intersex people and military service in the United States
- List of people who disappeared mysteriously: 1910–1990
