= Missing children of Pirmasens =

Set of child disappearance cases 1960-67

- Disappeared: Broschat (aged 9) - 25 November 1960; Stark (aged 9) - 17 January 1964; Lübbert (aged 10) - 8 September 1967; Pirmasens, Germany
- Status: Never found

The case of the missing children of Pirmasens refers to the disappearance of three German children in the 1960s in Pirmasens, who were suspected to have been murdered by a serial killer. Ernst Fischer, the police chief of Pirmasens, described the cases in his 1978 book The Pocket Book for Criminalists.

== Events ==
In the years 1960, 1964, and 1967, two boys and a girl — Walter Broschat (9), Klaus-Dieter Stark (9), and Eveline Lübbert (10) — disappeared. All three children were last seen near the area of Messeplatz in Pirmasens and all three abductions took place on a Friday. The children were never found, and the investigation went cold due to a lack of leads.

== Investigations ==
In 1973, a re-examination of the facts, in conjunction with offender profiling, brought new insights into the case. Following a checkout procedure, thousands of men in Pirmasens and the surrounding area were screened on the basis of suspicion. A then 42-year-old casual worker, who had known the boys well, became a preliminary suspect. He was often near the places where they later disappeared. During a six-hour interrogation, he began to contradict himself, so his guilt was considered by investigators to be secured. Instead of an arrest warrant, the district court of Zweibrücken ordered that he be admitted to a hospital in October 1974. The man consistently denied involvement and was released following a trial in March 1976 at the district court of Zweibrücken. The admission to the asylum was also ruled to be against the presumption of innocence and unconstitutional.

== See also ==
- List of German serial killers
- List of people who disappeared mysteriously (1910–1970)

== Literature ==
- Ernst Fischer: Vermißte Kinder in Pirmasens. In: Waldemar Burghard; Hans Werner Hamacher (Hrsg.): Taschenbuch für Kriminalisten Bd. 28, Hilden 1978, S. 145–182.
- Schablone X. In: Der Spiegel. Nr. 46, 1974, S. 66–70 (online – 11. November 1974).
- Kleiner Mythos. In: Der Spiegel. Nr. 16, 1976, S. 62–66 (online – 12. April 1976).
- Keine Leichen und kein Geständnis. In: Die Zeit, Nr. 11 vom 5. März 1976, online.
- Netz mit Löchern. In: Die Zeit, Nr. 16 vom 9. April 1976, online.
- Zehnjährige seit sechs Tagen vermißt. In: Hamburger Abendblatt, Nr. 213 vom 13. September 1967, Seite 24, online.
