= Disappearance of Henry Borynski =

1953 disappearance of a Polish priest in England

Henry Borynski
- Born: 8 October 1910; Poland
- Disappeared: 13 July 1953 (aged 42); Bradford, Yorkshire, England
- Status: Missing for 73 years, 2 months and 1 day
- Education: University of Kraków
- Occupation: Chaplain

Henry Borynski (born 8 October 1910) was a Polish priest who served as Roman Catholic chaplain to the Polish community in Bradford in Yorkshire. He was last seen on 13 July 1953, and his sudden disappearance remains unsolved.

== Background ==
Henry Borynski was born in a small village outside Kraków to humble origins. He won a scholarship to the grammar school at Oswiecim. He worked as a teacher at a technical school in Lodz.

Borynski received a degree in theology from the University of Kraków, and was ordained as a Catholic priest in 1938. He escaped from German-occupied Poland in 1940. He became chaplain and teacher of religion at the Polish Grammar School in Diddington, Cambridgeshire.

Borynski was appointed chaplain to the Polish community of Bradford in Yorkshire from October 1952. With around 1,500 Polish refugees from Communism in Bradford, it was the largest Polish emigre community in the North of England. Borynski was known for the anti-communist nature of his sermons. By all accounts, Borynski was well-liked and respected by all those he came into contact with.

Borynski replaced Canon Boleslaw Martynellis as priest to the Bradford Polish community. Martynellis claimed to have retired from his post for health reasons. Martynellis had actually been removed from his post following complaints that he kept a mistress that he described as his "niece". Martynellis entered into semi-retirement, but remained in Bradford and continued to perform Mass for the small local Lithuanian community.

Borynski was one of several Yorkshire-based Polish chaplains who led protests in October 1952 against the activities of Soviet agents in the Bradford area. It was rumoured that officials from the Soviet Embassy in London had visited refugees' homes after dark, pressuring them to return to Eastern Europe. Refugees had also received letters pressuring them to return to their own countries.

== The night of the disappearance ==
Borynski received two telephone calls on 13 July 1953. Following the first telephone call, he visited Canon Martynellis. Martynellis later told reporters that Borynski had come to see him because he said he had received a telephone call from someone purporting to be speaking on his behalf. Martynellis had not phoned him, nor had authorised anyone to make the telephone call.

Later in the evening, Borynski received a second telephone call from a man speaking Polish. Borynski was heard by his Polish housekeeper to speak in short, clipped sentences during the call, different from his normal cheerful disposition. Borynski reportedly said "All right, I go". Borynski was not normally secretive, but he was reported to have taken the call in a low voice, with his hand cupped around the mouthpiece. He left his lodgings at Little Horton Lane hurriedly, wearing an overcoat and hat, which he rarely did on a summer's evening. Borynski left his wallet and personal papers at the house, and had 10 shillings on his person.

Borynski was last seen outside the entrance to St Luke's Hospital, Bradford, just a few hundred yards from his home on Little Horton Lane. He told one Karol Wojciechowski, who started to engage him in conversation, that he didn't have much time and that he was going to "play detective".

== Investigation ==
Borynski's disappearance was not reported until two days after he was last seen. Bradford Police received assistance in the investigation from Scotland Yard and MI5.

British police were alerted to look for Borynski, though they deemed it unlikely that he had been kidnapped; he was described as 6 ft (180 cm) tall, and weighed 14 stone (200 lb; 89 kg). Police found no evidence to indicate that Borynski had left Britain. Police confirmed that there was no evidence that Borynski had been a victim of a Soviet assassin.

Police ultimately came to the conclusion that Borynski's disappearance was not voluntary, but were unable to determine his whereabouts.

An MI5 report disparaged the lead investigator of the case for Bradford police, Superintendent Thomas Rushworth, who was described as, "physically on the eve of retirement, and mentally somewhat beyond it".

=== Canon Martynellis ===
Police described Martynellis as the "main pivot" and the "focus" of their enquiry regarding Borynski's disappearance, and searched his home three times. The MI5 investigation regarded Martynellis as a man with "a dubious reputation", and suggested possible complicity in Borynski's disappearance between Martynellis and Polish intelligence services.

A police report described Martynellis as a "shifty, untrustworthy individual ... who would stop at nothing to gain his own ends". Leaders of the Polish community in Bradford considered Martynellis responsible for the murder of Borynski.

Martynellis was found to have purchased 60 lbs of caustic soda in the fortnight preceding Borynski's disappearance.

A month after Borynski's disappearance Martynellis was found collapsed at his home. Martynellis claimed that he had been visited by two men who ordered him to 'keep quiet priest'. Martynellis had no external injuries, and police declined to confirm that he had been attacked, but revealed that they were not searching for an assailant. Martynellis later claimed the attack could have been an hallucination, aggravated by the trauma he had suffered in a Soviet gulag during the Second World War.

Martynellis died from a heart attack in 1955.

== Theories ==
In 1962 it was reported that assassin Bogdan Staschynski had claimed that he had killed Borynski with a cyanide injection in a case of mistaken identity. It was claimed that he buried the body on Ilkley Moor. West German police, who held Staschynski in custody at the time, dismissed the report as a fabrication.

Bob Taylor, a retired British police detective, claimed on a 2003 edition of the BBC's Inside Out programme that Borynski was murdered by the Polish Secret Police. Taylor claimed that Martynellis was involved with Polish agents in arranging Borynski's abduction, saying that "Martynellis may have been told that this was the way to keep his old job and that he did not realise what he was getting involved in until it was too late". Taylor claimed that Catholic officials "knew more than they disclosed to police in Bradford at the time".

It was also suggested that Borynski was murdered by an overzealous member of Martynellis' congregation, who wished to see the priest reinstated. This was the theory favoured by the Bradford police.

== See also ==
- List of people who disappeared mysteriously: 1910–1990
