= Disappearance of Susan Pearson =

Unsolved disappearance which occurred in 1966

Susan Pearson
- Born: October 1, 1935; Portland, Oregon, U.S.
- Disappeared: March 13, 1966 (aged 30); Missoula, Montana, U.S.
- Status: Missing for 59 years, 9 months and 12 days
- Occupations: Doctoral student; instructor
- Height: 5 ft 0 in (1.52 m)

Susan Elizabeth Pearson (October 1, 1935 – disappeared March 13, 1966) was an American heiress who went missing under mysterious circumstances in Missoula, Montana. A native of Portland, Oregon, Pearson was a graduate student and instructor at the University of Montana (UM) at the time of her disappearance. She disappeared days before she was scheduled to submit her doctoral thesis, as well as administer an exam for a business course she was teaching.

Searches for Pearson proved unsuccessful, and her apartment was undisturbed. Her car was discovered abandoned in a business district of Missoula with her purse, keys, and other belongings inside. In 1970, bones were recovered in a rural area south of Missoula and initially suspected to be potentially be those of Pearson, but were subsequently determined to be animal bones. Pearson's disappearance is among the oldest cold cases in the state of Montana.

== Background ==
Pearson was born October 1, 1935, in Portland, Oregon, the daughter of David and Agatha Pearson. Her father was a prominent insurance agent in Portland. She was the granddaughter of Democratic state senator Walter Pearson. She had one younger brother, David, and younger sister, Virginia.

In 1966, then-30-year-old Pearson was working as a part-time instructor at the University of Montana (UM) in Missoula, Montana, and was working toward completing her doctoral thesis through the University of Oregon.

== Disappearance ==
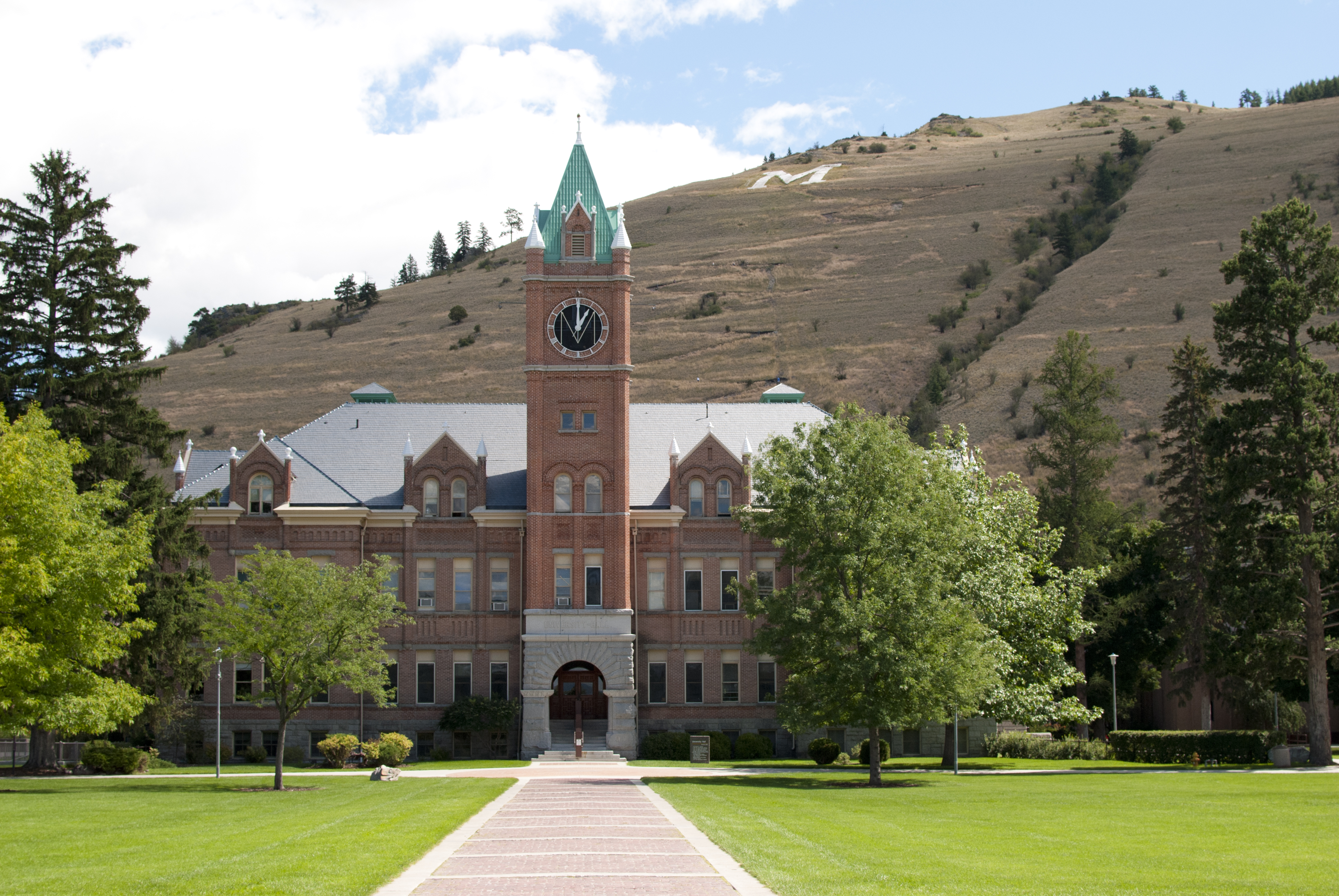
The University of Montana campus, where Pearson was last seen

Pearson was last seen March 13, 1966 by friends on the UM campus. She was scheduled to administer a business administration exam that day but failed to arrive. At the time of her disappearance, Pearson had been last seen wearing slacks, a green car coat with plaid lining, and two diamond rings. Susan King, a nightclub singer and friend of Pearson, told law enforcement that Pearson had visited her on March 12, the night before she disappeared, and stated that she seemed to be in a nervous, agitated, and depressed state. "It was just a different Sue," King recalled. King also alleged that Pearson had told her in the past that she had considered leaving and starting a new life.

On March 17, Pearson's vehicle was found abandoned in a business district of Missoula, with her purse, car keys, and identification inside. Pearson was reported missing the following day, March 18. It was reported that Pearson was also scheduled to turn in her doctoral thesis, though her father later stated it was an anthropology essay that was due. Two cheques for Pearson totaling $1,200 were left unclaimed. They were never cashed, which contributed to the theory that she didn't leave of her own accord.

== Investigation ==
Upon inspection, Pearson's apartment at 160 Strand Avenue was found undisturbed, though her brother, David, stated that it appeared to him as though his sister had left in a hurry, as a teakettle had been left boiling on the stove and an exterior porch light—which Pearson had typically left on in the evenings—had been turned off. King told law enforcement that "one or two boys" who had received poor grades in one of the courses Pearson was teaching had "threatened to wreck her car." On March 31, local police officers investigated a claim that Pearson had been sighted at the top of Lolo Pass, but found no evidence she had been there.

In May 1966, Pearson's family hired Burleigh Allen, a former FBI agent and private detective from Billings, to investigate Pearson's disappearance.

On October 29, 1970, bones from an arm and hand were discovered in the Blue Mountain region south of Missoula by several UM students. The sheriff who examined the bones at the scene suspected they may have been "four or five years old." Investigators initially suspected the bones belonged to Pearson. However, it was reported that pathologists believed the bones were not human, and instead belonged to a bear. Dr. Buchanan, a pathologist examining them, stated: "Just looking at the bones, we thought the wrist bones were too large in comparison to the length of the fingers." Missoula County Attorney Harold J. Pinsoneault stated after the discovery of the bones that it had been suspected that Pearson may have been murdered in the Blue Mountain area, though no suspect had been formally named.

In 2017, it was reported that Pearson's disappearance was one of the oldest cold cases in the state of Montana.

== See also ==
- List of people who disappeared mysteriously: 1910–1990
