= Stanisław Ptak =

Polish footballer (1902–1939)

Personal information
- Date of birth: 17 April 1902
- Place of birth: Kraków, Austria-Hungary
- Date of death: September 1939 (aged 37) (presumed)
- Height: 1.78 m (5 ft 10 in)
- Position: Forward

Senior career*
Years	Team	Apps	(Gls)
1920–1925	Olsza Kraków		
1925–1933	Cracovia		
1934–1935	KKS Sosnowiec		
1935–1936	Unia Sosnowiec		

International career
1927	Poland	1	(0)
- * Club domestic league appearances and goals

Stanisław Ptak (17 April 1902 – September 1939) was a Polish footballer who played as a forward.

He earned one cap for the Poland national team in 1927. He spent the majority of his career playing for Cracovia.

He disappeared during the Soviet invasion of Poland in September 1939, and was believed to have been killed by the NKVD when attempting to cross the border.

== Honours ==
Cracovia

- Ekstraklasa: 1930, 1932

== See also ==
- List of people who disappeared
