= Disappearance of Modesta Cefai =

1911 missing child case in Malta

Modesta Cefai
- Disappeared: August 27, 1911; Rabat, Gozo
- Status: Missing for 114 years, 11 months and 14 days
- Known for: Mysterious disappearance
- Parents: Joseph Cefai (father); Josephine Cefai (mother)

Modesta Cefai was a six-year-old Maltese girl who disappeared from Rabat, Gozo during the summer of 1911 after she had wandered out of her house and was never seen again. Despite efforts by the police to locate the girl, Cefai has never been located. Her ultimate fate remains unknown.

== Disappearance ==
On 27 August 1911 after wandering out of her home, she is thought to have been kidnapped and murdered by a paedophile. She was wearing a pink dress when she disappeared.

== Aftermath ==
Modesta's father Joseph Cefai called the police nine hours after she disappeared. The whole night the police looked for her, but didn't have any success. Cefai later accused a man named Lorenzo Frendo of kidnapping her, but this couldn't be proven. More than a century later one of Cefai's relatives is determined to solve the case by trying to find the remains of Modesta.

== See also ==
- List of people who disappeared mysteriously (1910–1970)
