= Alejandro Carrascosa =

Argentine Poet

- Born: Alejandro Nicolás Carrascosa Saavedra; April 2, 1901; Buenos Aires, Argentina
- Disappeared: September 22, 1922 (aged 21); Buenos Aires, Argentina
- Status: Missing for 103 years, 10 months and 15 days
- Occupations: Writer, poet

Alejandro Nicolás Carrascosa Saavedra (April 2, 1901 – disappeared September 1922) was an Argentine poet, writer, and scholar who disappeared under suspicious circumstances in 1922. Though born into poverty, Alejandro was descended from a line of wealthy land owners and soldiers. It is believed that he disappeared in search of a lost family fortune.

Alejandro is best known for his posthumously published story "The Unfortunate Son", though some theories hold that the story was only published under Carrascosa's name, and was actually written by Argentine author Jorge Luis Borges.

== Ancestry ==
Alejandro was raised on stories of his great-grandfather Antonio Ruiz Saavedra, a Spanish citizen who served the viceroy Gabriel de Avilés in Buenos Aires, and famously saved the viceroy's life from an assassination attempt in December 1800. When Gabriel de Avilés was promoted to Viceroy of Peru, Antonio Saavedra stayed in Buenos Aires, having fallen in love with and married María Alta Gracia, only daughter of a wealthy criollo family. As a parting gift, and in gratitude for having saved his life, the viceroy granted the couple a large landholding in the area surrounding Córdoba, María's hometown, which was 400 miles northwest of Buenos Aires.

Antonio and María moved to Córdoba, where Antonio became rector of the University of Córdoba from 1805 up until the Argentine War of Independence began in 1810. Through the influence of his wife's family, Antonio had become a supporter of the revolutionary movement. He dedicated his substantial wealth to the effort for independence and, in return, it is believed certain revolutionary leaders, including Francisco Ortiz de Ocampo, signed an edict allowing him and his family to retain their lands after the war.

By the end of the war in 1818, Antonio had died and the family land was seized except for their home in Córdoba and a small residence in Buenos Aires—the edict signed by the revolutionary leaders was either lost, disregarded, or never existed. Antonio's son Gerinaldo Saavedra Alta Gracia, despite dispossession, was an ardent patriot of the new nation and, after moving to Buenos Aires, became a lieutenant in the Buenos Aires Army.

== Early life ==
Alejandro Nicolás Carrascosa Saavedra was born in the San Telmo neighborhood of Buenos Aires, on April 2, 1901. His parents were Juan Carrascosa and Ilena Saavedra. Though they lived in an upper-class neighborhood, by this time the family fortune was gone and Alejandro grew up poor. His father was a teacher in the local secondary school, who made certain that Alejandro received a good education. In particular, he taught his son to appreciate Argentine authors and poets. Alejandro's mother was a seamstress and gifted storyteller, who enchanted him with tales of the family legacy.

== Search for the Ocampo paper ==
Though he was denied a scholarship, through hard work and brutal frugality Carrascosa was able to attend classes at the University of Buenos Aires beginning in 1919. In the third year of pursuing a degree in law, Carrascosa's appreciation of poetry led him to join a meeting of the artist's group, the Ultraistas.

Though he was not published in the group's Proa or Prisma, he became a quiet and steady presence within the group, where he met such literary figures as Jorge Luis Borges, Ricardo Molinari, and Ramón Wanlass. Borges' grandfather had been a member of the Buenos Aires Army and had fought alongside Carrascosa's grandfather in the Battle of Pavón (1861). Though this likely would have been a source of amity between the two men, in an excerpt from one of Carrascosa's few surviving journals dated February 21, 1922, Alejandro wrote:

Jorge, the shy one, and I spoke [...] of our grandfathers and of our shared inheritance [...] of faded glory. He fears not living up to the romantic image of his ancestors. I feel no fear, no shame. I only feel called to vindicate my blood and to regain the power of my heritage.

Carrascosa told his artist friends about his great-grandfather's wealth and about the letter that Ocampo had conceivably signed guaranteeing the family's rights to the land. One of these friends informed Carrascosa that there was a large collection of historical documents from the time of the revolution that was kept in the archives of the old Jesuit library at the University of Córdoba. There is no record of this collection, but Carrascosa borrowed money and traveled to Córdoba on the friend's advice.

Though he doubted that possession of this letter would return the land rights to his family, Carrascosa believed that he had a familial right to the paper itself, which would be of value. Also, he hoped the letter might improve the family's position in society.

Carrascosa returned to Buenos Aires a month later, disillusioned and depressed. Not only had he not found the letter, but in the archives he had found no evidence at all of his great-grandfather Antonio Ruiz Saavedra. He told this to his friends, and one of them suggested that he check the National Library in Buenos Aires, where their connections would allow him to search the archive in depth.

In the National Library, the only paper Carrascosa found which included his great-grandfather's name was about a supply ship, the San Nicolás, which had disappeared in 1807 on the way up river to Corrientes, a city 600 miles north of Buenos Aires and nearly as far from Córdoba. At the time Corrientes was repelling a British invasion and the San Nicolás, carrying rations and wages for the city's garrison, was supposedly sunk long before reaching its destination. Antonio Ruiz Saavedra, Alejandro's great-grandfather, was listed as one of the few survivors.

== Disappearance ==
Carrascosa's friends remember his first visit to the National Library as a turning point. He continued returning to the library each day for the next month and stopped attending the artists' meetings. When his friends saw him, he always appeared in an elevated state of either agitation or excitement.

On September 22, 1922, without telling his friends or parents, Carrascosa left Buenos Aires. He left no note as to his whereabouts, and burned most of his notebooks.

The journals that he did not destroy are mostly poetry. One poem, "Legacy" (a notably non-Ultraist example), later published as part of Carrascosa's Febrero, Enero collection, is often considered a hint about the obsession that may have been driving Carrascosa at this point:

...fortune wrapped in shining lies
too much for you to spend
truth rests under unmarked graves
how much was buried with it?

== Sightings ==
Though never confirmed, Ramón Wanlass claimed to have seen Carrascosa during a visit to Cartagena in 1933. Xul Solar also believed that he ran into him in a book store in Havana in 1941.

A different theory is that an unidentified body found a year after Carrascosa's disappearance actually belonged to the young writer. The body was found in Corrientes, on the grounds of an abandoned Jesuit church. It was decomposed beyond the point of identification, but was believed to be the victim of a stabbing. No suspects were ever identified.

== Writing ==
Alejandro Carrascosa was the author of one book of poems, Febrero, Enero ('February, January'), and several short stories, all published after his disappearance. His short story, "El hijo desafortunado" ('The Unfortunate Son'), was published five years after his disappearance and there are many unsupported theories that it is actually an early Borges effort at short fiction published under Carrascosa's name.

== See also ==
- List of people who disappeared mysteriously: 1910–1990
