= 2005 in France =

- Decades: 1980s; 1990s; 2000s; 2010s; 2020s
- See also: History of France; Timeline of French history; List of years in France

This article lists events from the year 2005 in France.

== Incumbents ==
- President: Jacques Chirac
- Prime Minister: Jean-Pierre Raffarin (until 31 May), Dominique de Villepin (starting 31 May)

== Events ==
- 5 January – Libération journalist Florence Aubenas and her Iraqi guide Hussein Hanoun Al-Saadi are taken hostage in Iraq (freed on 11 June).
- 11 February – André Vingt-Trois is named Archbishop of Paris.
- 20 February – Murders of Christelle and Lucas Leroy in Paris.
- 23 February – A controversial French law on colonialism, requiring teachers to paint it in a positive light, is passed by the national legislature.
- 25 February – Resignation of Minister of Finance Hervé Gaymard, following a scandal over the low rent of the exclusive apartment he occupied.
- March – The Renault Laguna gets facelifted.
- 31 March – An amendment to the 35-hour workweek law is voted, extending possibilities of overtime.
- April – The Fillon law reforming France's education system is voted, amidst student protests numbering hundreds of thousands.
- 6 April – First mental 13th root calculation of a 200-digit number, computed by Alexis Lemaire.
- 15 April – 2005 Paris fires – 24 people are killed and around 50 are injured in a fire at a hotel in central Paris.
- 27 April – First flight of Airbus A380 in Toulouse.
- 28 April – Sales begin of the Peugeot 1007 mini MPV.
- 16 May – Pentecost Monday ceases to be a statutory holiday, leading to strong protests.
- 19 May – Vélo'v bicycle-sharing system introduced in Lyon.
- 29 May – French referendum on the European Constitution votes resoundingly to reject it.
- 31 May – A new government, headed by Dominique de Villepin, is nominated.
- June – The Peugeot 307 gets facelifted.
- 28 June – Official announcement that ITER will be built in Cadarache, Southern France.
- 5 July – Laurence Parisot becomes the president of the Mouvement des Entreprises de France.
- 2 August – Air France Flight 358 bursts into flames after skidding off the end of runway in Toronto, all passengers survive.
- 11 August – Ariane 5GS launches Thaïcom-4/iPStar-1, the heaviest telecommunications satellite to date at 6505 kg, into orbit.
- 16 August – West Caribbean Airways Flight 708 crashes in Venezuela, killing 160, mostly French citizens from Martinique.
- 16 August – Assassination of Frère Roger, founder of the Taizé community.
- September – New Renault Clio is launched at the Frankfurt Motor Show.
- 3 September – Jacques Chirac is hospitalized for a "small vascular incident" affecting his eyesight.
- 11 October – Murder of Marine Boisseranc.
- 27 October – 2005 civil unrest in France begins, and will last until 17 November.
- November – The Renault Clio is voted European Car of the Year.
- 8 November – President Jacques Chirac declares a state of emergency on the 12th day of the French civil unrest.
- 16 November – Ariane 5 launches Spaceway-F2 and Telkom-2, the rocket's heaviest dual payload to date, at more than 8000 kg.
- 18 November – Partial privatization of Électricité de France.
- 27 November – Surgeons in France carry out the first human face transplant on Isabelle Dinoire.

=== Undated ===
- Sourya, a French pop band is formed.

== Births ==
- 17 October – Lola Lovinfosse, racing driver
- 9 December – Emily Hallifax, diver
- 19 – Fabien Brau-Boirie, rugby player
- 21 December – Gabriel Debru, tennis player

== Deaths ==
=== January to March ===
- 3 January – Claude Meillassoux, economic anthropologist and Africanist (born 1925).
- 5 January – René Le Hénaff, film editor and director (born 1901).
- 7 January – Pierre Daninos, writer and humorist (born 1913).
- 8 January – Jacqueline Joubert, television presenter (born 1921).
- 8 January – Michel Thomas, linguist, language teacher and decorated war veteran (born 1914).
- 10 January – Georges Bernier, also known as Le Professeur Choron, humorist (born 1929).
- 11 January – Fernand Cazenave, international rugby union player and coach (born 1924).
- 15 January – Michel Moine, journalist and parapsychologist (born 1920).
- 27 January – Aurélie Nemours, painter (born 1910).
- 28 January
  - Jacques Villeret, actor (born 1951).
  - Karen Lancaume, adult film star (born 1973).
- February – Madeleine Giteau, historian (born 1918).
- 6 February – Hubert Curien, physicist (born 1924).
- 7 February
  - Madeleine Rebérioux, historian (born 1920).
  - Paul Rebeyrolle, painter (born 1926).
- 10 February
  - Humbert Balsan, film producer (born 1954).
  - Jean Cayrol, poet and publisher (born 1911).
- 11 February – Raymond Hermantier, actor (born 1924).
- 13 February – Maurice Trintignant, motor racing driver (born 1917).
- 15 February – Pierre Bachelet, singer songwriter (born 1944).
- 22 February – Simone Simon, actress (born 1910).
- 25 February – Jean Prat, international rugby player (born 1923).
- 1 March – Edouard Stern, banker (born 1954).
- 15 March – Jean-Pierre Genet, cyclist (born 1940).

=== April to June ===
- 8 April – Maurice Lafont, international soccer player (born 1927).
- 11 April
  - André François, cartoonist (born 1915).
  - Lucien Laurent, international soccer player, scored the first ever World Cup goal (born 1907).
- 3 May – Pierre Moerlen, drummer and percussionist (born 1952).
- 5 May – Claude Julien, journalist and editor (born 1925).
- 13 May – Eddie Barclay, music producer (born 1921).
- 20 May – Paul Ricœur, philosopher (born 1913).
- 29 June – François-Xavier Verschave, one of founders of the NGO Survie (born 1945).

=== July to September ===
- 2 July – Pierre Michelot, double bass player (born 1928).
- 6 July – Claude Simon, novelist, 1985 Nobel Laureate in Literature (born 1913).
- 8 July – Laurent-Michel Vacher, philosopher, writer and journalist (born 1944).
- 19 July
  - Alain Bombard, biologist, physician, politician and sailor (born 1924).
  - Jean-Michel Gaillard, politician (born 1946).
- 26 July – Pierre Broué, historian and Trotskyist (born 1926).
- 28 July – Jacques Lacarrière, ice hockey player (born 1906).
- 3 August – Françoise d'Eaubonne, feminist writer (born 1920).
- 7 August – Paul Arnaud de Foïard, General (born 1921).
- 9 August
  - Colette Besson, Olympic athlete (born 1946).
  - François Dalle, businessman
- 16 August – Frère Roger, founder of the Taizé community (born 1915).
- 22 August
  - Henri Genès, actor and singer (born 1919).
  - Luc Ferrari, composer (born 1929).
- 28 August – Jacques Dufilho, actor (born 1914).
- 31 August
  - Stéphane Bruey, international soccer player (born 1932).
  - André Debry, one of the last surviving French veterans of World War I (born 1898).
- 9 September – André Pousse, actor (born 1919).
- 17 September – Jacques Lacarrière, writer, critic, journalist, and essayist (born 1925).
- 24 September – André Testut, motor racing driver (born 1926).

=== October to December ===
- 5 October – Alexis Tendil, World War I veteran (born 1896).
- 17 October – Jean Lescure, poet (born 1912).
- 25 October – Arman, artist (born 1928).
- 27 October
  - Jean-Claude Irvoas, murder victim (born 1949).
- 28 October – Raymond Hains, artist and photographer (born 1926).
- 7 November – Jean-Jacques Le Chenadec, urban violence victim (born 1944).
- 9 November
  - Jean Catoire, composer (born 1923).
  - Marceau Somerlinck, soccer player (born 1922).
- November – Dominique Chaboche, politician and MEP (born 1937).
- 4 December – Gloria Lasso, singer (born 1922).
- 17 December – Jacques Fouroux, international rugby union player, coach (born 1947).

=== Full date unknown ===
- Ernestine Chassebœuf, letter writer (born 1910).
