= Gender inequality in France =

Gender inequalities in France affect several areas, including family life, education, employment, health, and political participation.

The United Nations Development Programme (UNDP) monitors gender disparities through the Gender Inequality Index (GII), which evaluates reproductive health, empowerment, and labor market participation.

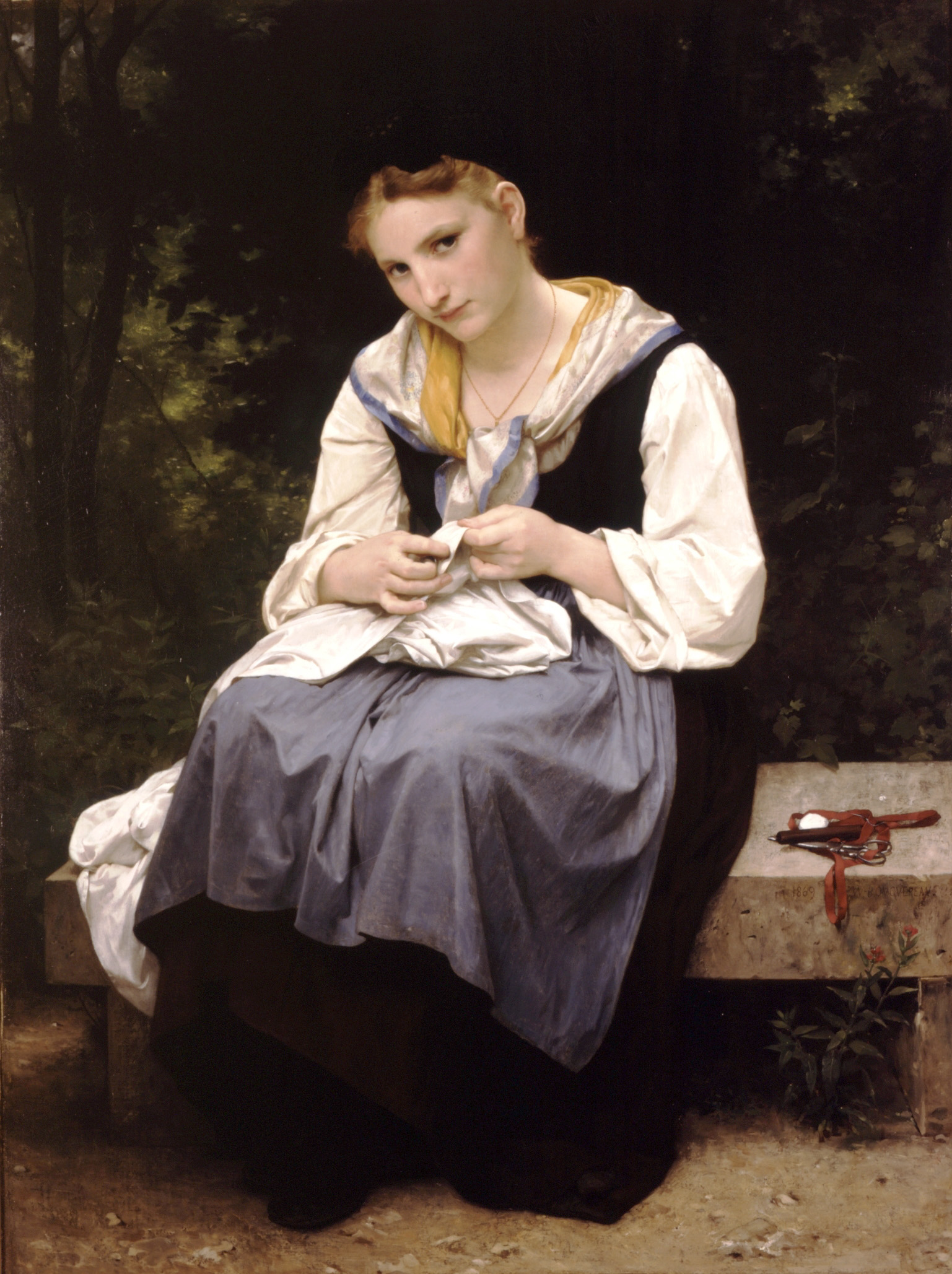
Young factory worker, painting by William Bouguereau, 1869.

== Family sphere ==
Women in France perform approximately 64% of household labor. Between 1966 and 1986, men's participation in domestic tasks increased slightly but has remained largely unchanged since. Task distribution becomes more unequal in households with two or more children, with men's involvement decreasing by about 10%. A study by INED reports that 30% of men primarily manage household chores; however, this figure does not include the 15% of children involved in family court proceedings following separation, in which fathers may take on increased caregiving and domestic responsibilities. According to a 2010 INSEE study, women spend an average of 3 hours and 26 minutes per day on domestic tasks, compared to 2 hours for men.

Child custody is contested in approximately 18% of divorces. In about 90% of cases, custody is awarded to the mother, with few fathers requesting custody. Custody is awarded to fathers in about 8% of cases. Post-divorce, women experience a greater decline in standard of living compared to men. Following separation, approximately one-third of women and one-half of men enter new partnerships. Shared custody arrangements are becoming more common and now account for about 10% of divorce cases.

== Leisure time and unpaid work ==
In 2010, women in France spent an average of 3 hours and 46 minutes per day on leisure activities, compared to 4 hours and 24 minutes for men. This difference is primarily attributed to disparities in time spent on activities such as gaming, internet use, and sports.

According to sociologist Sibylle Gollac (2020), in households with children, men worked an average of 51 hours per week, with two-thirds of that time being paid work. Women worked an average of 54 hours per week, with two-thirds of that time consisting of unpaid work.

== Professional sphere ==
Women obtained the legal right to work without spousal authorization under the law of July 13, 1965, which came into effect on 1 February 1966.

As of recent data (excluding Mayotte), 68.2% of women aged 15–64 were active in the labor market, compared to 75.8% of men in the same age group.

According to a CFTC report, 49% of women reported that having a child significantly affected their employment situation, compared to 14% of men. These effects may include job changes, reductions in working hours, or parental leave.

=== Unemployment ===
In 2007, women represented 45% of the active workforce (approximately 11.2 million) and had an unemployment rate of 9.1%, compared to 7.8% for men. By 2012, unemployment rose to 10% for women and 9.7% for men. Since 2014, the male unemployment rate has exceeded that of women, according to INSEE data.

=== Employment ===
Approximately half of all women are employed. Women represent 76% of employees but only 18% of manual workers. In the private sector, two-thirds of executive roles are held by men. Fewer than 20% of business leaders are women.

Around 11% of women hold temporary positions—such as fixed-term contracts, or subsidized jobs—compared to 8% of all employees.

Parenthood is reported as a factor that may influence employment trajectories. Some studies indicate that pregnancy and maternity leave can affect career progression.

==== Salary ====
In 2021, the average annual salary in the private sector was €18,630 for women and €24,640 for men, reflecting a 24.4% gap. This difference is partially attributed to variations in working hours, job types, and the prevalence of part-time work, which accounted for approximately 40% of the wage gap in 2017. When adjusted to full-time equivalents, the average wage gap was 15.5% in 2021, down from 17.5% in 2016.

The wage gap tends to increase with age: it was 4.6% at age 25 and rose to 27.5% among those over 60. Differences in working time decrease with age, from 20% under age 25 to 10% between ages 25 and 60.

For workers, women earned 14.3% less than men for equivalent hours and worked 23.3% fewer hours. Among employees, women earned 4.7% less for similar hours and had nearly equal working time. The pay gap for equal hours was 16.1% among executives and 12.2% among intermediate professions, with women in these groups also working fewer hours (4.7% and 10.9%, respectively).

For equivalent positions and working hours, the wage gap was 4.3%, though occupational segregation—such as differences in sector and employer—affects this figure.

In the public sector, the overall gender wage gap was 14%. Among executives, the gap was 23%; among workers, 17%; and among employees, 7%.

For full-time salaried positions, the gender wage gap declined from 29.4% in 1976 to 16.3% in 2017. The gap narrowed steadily until 1980, remained largely stable until 2000, and began to decrease again thereafter, though part-time employment among women influenced this trend.

==== Part-time work ====
Approximately 30% of women in France work part-time, compared to 5% of men. Of the 4.1 million part-time workers, 83% are women. The prevalence of part-time work among women is closely associated with the presence of young children in the household. Among part-time workers, 28% of women and 42% of men report working part-time involuntarily, indicating a preference for more working hours.

==== Skilled jobs and hierarchical positions ====
Women are more frequently employed in lower-skilled positions. In 2018, 25.9% of employed women held unskilled employee or laborer roles, compared to 15% of men. Conversely, 15.7% of employed women held executive positions, compared to 20.8% of men.

Occupational segregation remains a key characteristic of the labor market. Service-related occupations, as well as teaching and cleaning jobs, are predominantly held by women. Highly skilled positions in the tertiary sector are more gender-balanced.

Studies have found that women face more obstacles than men in accessing promotions and salary increases, a phenomenon referred to as the "glass ceiling."

The Copé-Zimmermann Law of 27 January 2011 requires companies with more than 500 employees or annual revenues above €50 million to appoint at least 40% women to their boards of directors and supervisory boards. This requirement was later extended to include mutual insurance organizations under the insurance code. As a result, women comprised 26% of board members in the 120 largest publicly traded companies in 2013, increasing to 43.6% by 2019.

The Rixain Law, adopted in 2021, aims to increase women's representation in economic and professional leadership. It includes provisions for:

- An index to measure gender equality in higher education programs;
- Quotas for leadership positions in large companies: 30% of executive managers and governing body members must be women by 2027, rising to 40% by 2030.

=== Workplace accidents ===
Women are underrepresented in sectors associated with higher physical risks, which contributes to lower reported rates of workplace accidents. Fewer than 26% of non-fatal work accidents involve women. Similarly, women account for 25% of workplace accidents resulting in permanent disability. Fatal work accidents are substantially more common among men, with 25 times more men than women dying on the job.

=== Occupational diseases ===
Men are more likely to be employed in positions with higher exposure to occupational health hazards. They account for two-thirds of occupational diseases leading to permanent disability. Deaths from occupational disease are over 80 times more common among men than women.

=== Night work ===
Fewer than 25% of night shift positions are held by women.

=== Indirect effects of labor division ===
Gender-based differences in job type, role, sector, and working hours are among the primary contributors to the wage gap. An estimated 75% of the overall wage gap can be attributed to these structural factors, with working hours being the most influential. Even when controlling for working time, educational background, professional experience, qualifications, region, sector, and job position, men's salaries remain approximately 10% higher than those of women.

== Health ==
=== General overview ===
Studies on gender and health remain limited. In the early 21st century, life expectancy in France was higher for women than men—85.3 years compared to 79.4 in 2018. However, healthy life expectancy was similar, with women at 64.5 years and men at 63.4 in 2018. Since 2004, healthy life expectancy has increased for men but remained stable for women.

Historically, in Western societies, male and female health have been conceptualized differently. From Antiquity onward, the male body was viewed as the standard, while the female body was seen as a variation and more prone to illness. Diagnoses and treatment have differed depending on the patient's sex. In 17th- and 18th-century Europe, women were more often diagnosed with nervous disorders. During this period, medical and state interests in reproduction led to increased study of the female body, particularly as a reproductive body, with a focus on the uterus. New professions, such as midwifery and obstetrics, developed in this context. From the late 18th century onward, sexuality began to be medicalized. Behavioral norms were reframed in medical rather than religious terms, with differences in how male and female behavior were judged. For a prolonged period, women's bodies and intellects were considered inferior in medical discourse, contributing to gendered hierarchies. Women's health was often regarded as pathological or dysfunctional by default.

Scientific research has also been shaped by gender bias. According to physician Robert Barouki (2023), research on women's health has historically been limited by social bias and an emphasis on male physiology. French geneticist Claudine Junien noted in 2016 that France lagged behind other countries in integrating sex-based biological differences in research and treatment, though attention to gender parity in healthcare was increasing.

=== Elements regarding the consideration of gender in medicine ===
Efforts to incorporate gender into medical research began in the late 1980s, primarily in the United States. In 1995, the World Health Organization (WHO) established the Department of Gender and Women's Health. Several European countries followed in the early 2000s by creating research bodies focused on gender in medicine. In France, the "Gender and Health Research" group was created at Inserm in 2013. Public institutions such as French National Public Health Agency and the Haute Autorité de Santé (HAS) have since addressed gender disparities in research and treatment.

=== Impacts of gender stereotypes in health and medicine ===
Gender stereotypes influence both diagnosis and treatment practices for men and women. Ancient theories, such as those of Hippocrates, perpetuated hierarchical models in which the female body was considered a deviation from the male norm—a view that persisted into the 19th century.

Some diseases are underdiagnosed in one sex due to stereotypical associations. For instance, women are less frequently and less accurately diagnosed with myocardial infarction, despite an increase in incidence among women between 2008 and 2013 (+20%). Symptoms in women may differ from those in men and are less well-known or recognized. In 2015, cardiovascular disease accounted for 51% of deaths in women in Europe. Similar disparities exist in other conditions. Women with chronic obstructive pulmonary disease (COPD) are diagnosed later than men, even though prevalence is now similar. Women with autism spectrum disorders are often diagnosed late, which has been linked to significantly reduced life expectancy compared to non-autistic women. Strokes, more common among women, also have more severe outcomes in women but were less studied in female patients as of 2017. Conversely, some conditions such as osteoporosis are underdiagnosed in men, as the disease is often seen as predominantly affecting women. Despite this, men represent one-third of hip fractures and have a higher risk of complications.

Historically, men's pain has been treated as abnormal and requiring medical intervention, while women's pain, especially related to menstruation and childbirth, was considered normal and often left untreated. The perception of menstruation-related pain as natural—sometimes reinforced by religious narratives—contributed to this neglect. Pain relief in childbirth gradually advanced, with chemical anesthesia introduced in the 19th century, and techniques such as pain-free childbirth in 1950s France. Epidural anesthesia became common from the 1980s onward. Menstrual pain and conditions like endometriosis (affecting around 10% of women) have only been widely recognized by the medical profession since the late 2010s. Endometriosis was officially recognized as a medical condition in France in 1990. A national awareness plan was launched in 2019, and the disease was classified as a long-term illness in 2022.

Some studies suggest that women may delay seeking care, often prioritizing family responsibilities and underestimating their symptoms.

=== Impacts of the underrepresentation of women in certain research and clinical trials ===
Historically, women were often excluded from clinical trials for reasons such as hormonal variability or concerns about pregnancy-related risks. This exclusion has limited understanding of how certain diseases and treatments affect women. For example, women's cardiovascular diseases—the leading cause of death among women—remain under-researched, and treatment outcomes are often less favorable for women. Other areas with gender data gaps include HIV, some cancers, and the side effects of medication. Due to underrepresentation in trials, women experience more side effects—up to twice as many as men—which has both health and financial consequences, as noted by the French Academy of Medicine in 2016. Drug efficacy may also differ by sex.

=== The long-standing exclusive focus on women's reproductive health ===
For centuries, medical focus on women has largely centered on reproductive health, with limited attention to other medical needs.

=== Inclusion of people of all genders in defining public health policies ===
Sociologist Monique Membrado observed in 2006 that women have been underrepresented in the formulation of major public health issues—including HIV, addiction, cardiovascular disease, and cancer—and particularly absent in occupational health discussions.

=== Access to healthcare ===
In 2021, the French Senate's Delegation for Women's Rights reported that women's health was not considered a priority in rural areas, where medical desertification limits access to gynecological care. This can result in delayed care and inadequate cancer screening. France has faced a shortage of medical gynecologists, with some departments lacking them entirely. Medical gynecology, a discipline distinct from obstetrics and specific to France, saw a halt in specialist training from 1984 to 2003 as the country considered aligning with other European healthcare systems that do not maintain this distinction.

== Retirement ==
On average, women in France receive pensions that are 41.7% lower than those received by men when considering only direct entitlement pensions. This gap is reduced to approximately 29% when accounting for child-related bonuses and survivor's pensions.

Maternity leave daily allowances paid prior to 2012 are not included in the calculation of average annual income for pension purposes, which contributes to the pension gap.

== Wealth inequalities ==
Between 1998 and 2015, the wealth gap between men and women in France increased from 9% to 16%. This disparity is partially linked to the types of assets inherited. Women are more likely to receive liquid financial compensation, while men more frequently inherit appreciating structural assets such as real estate or businesses. Additional contributing factors include greater economic vulnerability for women following separation or divorce. Approximately 30% of women, compared to 3% of men, experience a decline in financial stability post-separation. This is partly due to the conversion of alimony from regular annuities to lump-sum payments in the early 2000s. The average amount dropped from €93,000 to €25,000. Child support calculations are typically based on the payer's financial capacity rather than the recipient's needs. As women more often have custody, they are more likely to rely on social support to maintain living standards. Property ownership can also become difficult to retain. In situations involving domestic violence among homeowners in heterosexual couples, women who leave the shared residence may do so without negotiating their share, often in order to expedite the separation process.

== Representation in institutions ==
=== General overview ===
Women have access to all public and political offices under the same legal conditions as men. However, disparities remain in representation. In 2012, women made up 22% of the Senate and 27% of the National Assembly, despite constituting approximately 53% of the electorate. These figures exist in the context of the Law of June 6, 2000, which mandates gender parity in political representation.

=== The case of the Judiciary ===
Gender parity in the judiciary has progressed in recent years. In 2010, women represented 57% of magistrates across all roles. By 2014, 72.6% of candidates admitted to the National School for the Judiciary (ENM) were women. The record was set in 2012 with 81.04%.

The family court judiciary is composed of over 98% women, although cases concern individuals of all genders equally.

=== Political office ===
The Law of June 6, 2000, requires gender parity on candidate lists for municipal, regional, senatorial, and European elections. In legislative elections, parties that do not adhere to parity are subject to financial penalties.

In 2012, women represented 26.9% of the French National Assembly and 36.4% of the European Parliament. In 2017, 223 women were elected to the National Assembly, constituting 38.65% of its members.

Globally, no national parliament has a female majority in both chambers. Rwanda and Bolivia have female majorities in their lower houses, though their upper houses have male majorities.

== Sports ==
A 2017 INSEE study reported persistent gender disparities in physical and sports activities. Women were underrepresented in racket and team sports. In media coverage, women's sports accounted for less than 20% of televised sports airtime.

Leadership roles in sports organizations remain limited for women. Despite the 2014 law for real gender equality, in 2019 only one Olympic sports federation and eleven non-Olympic federations were led by women.

== Suicide ==
Since 2013, the National Suicide Observatory has published data on suicide trends in France. Sociological and demographic factors influence the incidence and outcome of suicide across genders.

- Hospitalizations for suicide attempts are more frequent among women. In 2016, 47,110 women and 29,956 men were hospitalized following suicide attempts (61% women). In 2020, the figures were 47,826 women and 31,346 men (60.4% women).
- Suicidal ideation is also more common among women. In 2016, 5.4% of women and 4% of men reported suicidal thoughts; in 2020, the figures were 4.7% and 3.6%, respectively.
- Suicide mortality, however, is significantly higher among men. In 2016, 6,450 men and 1,985 women died by suicide (76% men). In 2020, there were 8,415 male and 2,790 female deaths by suicide (75% men).

== Historical overview ==
=== Revolutionary period (French Revolution and subsequent years) ===
1789

- December 14: Law granting municipalities authority over public works, including managing "prostitution" (confirmed by an August 1790 judicial organization decree).

1790

- March: Decree on feudal successions, abolishing primogeniture and affirming gender equality in inheritance.
- May–June: Decree establishing relief workshops for beggars, differentiated by sex, age, and health (women and children assigned to spinning rather than agricultural workshops).
- August: Requirement for public prosecutor's hearing if a married woman (or ward, minor, or legally incapacitated person, male or female) is involved in judicial proceedings.

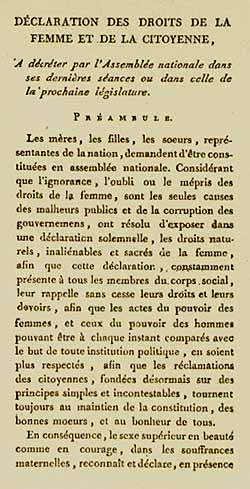
Preamble to the Declaration of the Rights of Women and the Female Citizen, 1791.

1791

- April: Decree abolishing sex-based distinctions in intestate successions.
- July 8–10: Decree with measures repressing prostitution.
- July 19–22: Decree on municipal and correctional police organization, mandating sex separation in correctional facilities and assigned tasks, and measures against individuals (both sexes) deemed to have offended public morals.
- August 26: Olympe de Gouges publishes the Declaration of the Rights of Woman and the Female Citizen during the French Revolution, which grants citizenship to most men but does not extend the same rights to women.
- September 3: French Constitution of September 3, 1791, establishes crown succession laws excluding women from regency, secularizes marriage as a civil contract, and implicitly denies women citizenship.
- September–October: Decree specifying specific treatment for women sentenced to irons.
- September 28: Wives' offenses fall under husbands' civil liability.

1792

- April 8: Decree protecting wives of political emigrants, but not husbands of female emigrants.
- August 31: Decree adjusting penalties for pregnant women sentenced to the pillory.
- September 20: Law on civil status registration and divorce, establishing near equality between spouses. Minimum marriage age set at 13 for girls and 15 for boys.

1793

- April 30: Decree dismissing "useless" women (prostitutes) from armies.
- June 10–11: Decree on communal property division, allowing women and men over 21 to participate and vote in assemblies.
- June 24: Constitution of Year I denies women citizenship rights.
- June 28: Decree on annual aid for children, the elderly, and the indigent, mandating districts to provide secret housing for pregnant girls to give birth, with confidentiality and funded care (children born become wards of the nation); free childbirth care for indigent women, mandatory breastfeeding (except for medical reasons) for indigent families, with financial aid.
- August 24: Married women's annuities and interest remain theirs but are paid directly to husbands.
- October 30: Decree banning women's political clubs and societies.
- December 19: Decree mandating state-organized compulsory primary education for girls and boys aged 6–8.

1794

- February 4: Abolition of slavery in French colonies (not applied in some later-acquired colonies; slavery reestablished in most colonies from 1802, except Saint-Domingue, independent in 1804).
- March 12: Possibility to annul religious vows made before age 18 for girls or 21 for boys.

1795

- April 12: Decree stating no woman accused of a capital crime can be tried until verified she is not pregnant, with provisions for verification, temporary reprieves, or penalty adjustments.
- May 23: Decree barring women from political assemblies and gatherings of more than five.
- October 25: Bonuses for certain requisitioned port workers during wartime are paid directly to wives.

1798

- April 4: Law on debtor's imprisonment, with specific provisions for women.
- December 23: Tax provisions differ by sex for unmarried individuals.

1799

- December 13: Constitution of 22 Frimaire Year VIII (establishing the Consulate) grants citizenship only to men over 21, born and residing in France, and registered in their commune's civic registry, effectively excluding women.

1800

- July 26: Order regulating the number of women accompanying the army.
- November 17 (Paris): Police prefect ordinance bans women from wearing men's clothing, including trousers, though permits can be granted.

1801

- November 17: Decree allowing certain absent soldiers to allocate a quarter of their salary to wives or children.

1802

- Reestablishment of slavery by Napoleon Bonaparte.
- May 1: Law on public education organizes schooling primarily for boys, with male-only teachers; women are barred from entering lycée premises.
- May 3: Decree specifying domestic servant taxation based on sex and number employed.

1803

- March 10: Law regulating medical practice codifies midwifery, with fines for women practicing illegally.

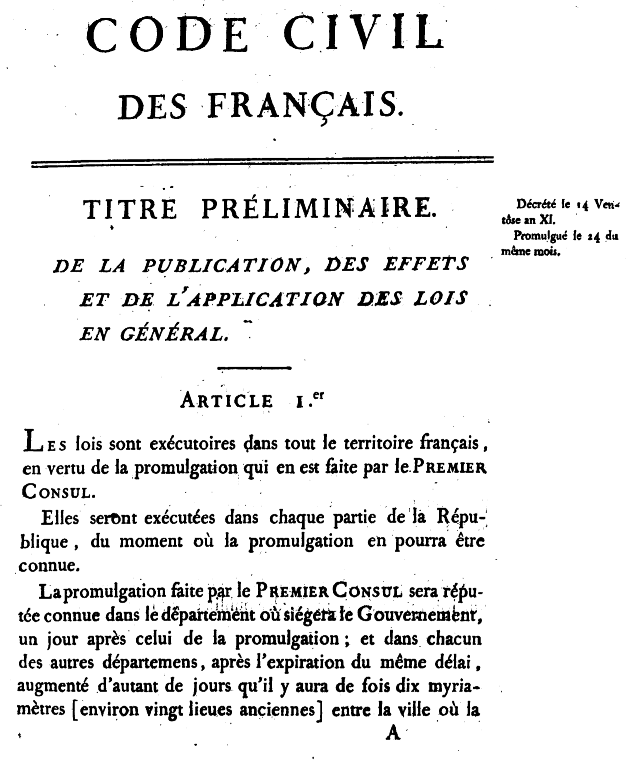
French Civil Code, 1804, first page of the original edition.

1804

- March 21: Adoption of the Civil Code ("Napoleonic Code"), institutionalizing women's legal inferiority and mandating obedience to husbands.
- May 18: Imperial Constitution (Organic Senatus-Consultum of 28 Floréal Year XII) establishes the First Empire, maintaining monarchy-era crown succession laws.

=== First Empire ===
- September 15, 1807: If a husband goes bankrupt, the wife's personal assets are also affected.
- March 17, 1808: Decree organizing the university bans women from entering colleges or lycées.
- March 29, 1809: Decree organizing Napoleon's imperial houses in Écouen and Saint-Denis to educate battlefield orphans' daughters as "future mothers."
- 1810: Penal Code of 1810 includes measures specific to women or differentiates penalties by sex.
- January 19, 1811: Decree on foundlings, abandoned children, and poor orphans, with education differing by sex.
- October 15, 1812: Decree on the Théâtre-Français's oversight, organization, administration, accounting, police, and discipline, admitting equal numbers of male and female students.
- February 5, 1813: Organic Senatus-Consultum on imperial regency and the coronation of the empress and prince imperial, prioritizing the empress for regency and barring her remarriage.

=== Restoration ===
1816

- May 8: Law abolishing divorce.

1820

- April 3: Ordinance applying the provisions of the February 29, 1816, ordinance to girls' schools and entrusting prefects with their supervision: cantonal organization of girls' primary schools.
- October 29: If prisoners are transferred and gendarmerie premises are requisitioned with detainees of both sexes present, local public authorities must provide accommodation for female prisoners.

1821

- October 31: Royal ordinance regulating higher-level girls' educational institutions upon their creation.

1824

- May 10: Circular from the Keeper of the Seals specifying that marriage age dispensations can only apply to girls over 14 years old (except in cases of pregnancy) and boys over 17 years old.
- August 20: Upon dismissal or illness of a Royal Printing Office official, the retirement pension is defined, with a lower amount for women than for men. A widow of such an official may, in certain cases, be entitled to a survivor's pension.
- December 8: Prohibition on women directing theatrical troupes.

1825

- A survivor's pension is granted to widows of Finance Department officials.

1829

- April 15: In cases of a wife's fishing offense, her husband is civilly liable.

1830

- August 7: Constitutional Charter of 1830 reiterates crown succession rules excluding women.

=== July Monarchy ===
1831

- March 26: Residents in France, regardless of nationality, are subject to personal tax if they enjoy their rights. For women, this applies to single women with a profession or personal income living independently, women separated from their husbands, and widows.
- April 19: For a man to be a voter, his and his wife's assets are considered in calculating contributions. If a woman is separated, divorced, or widowed, her contributions are associated with a close male relative's assets (excluding illegitimate children) at her discretion.

1832

- April 14: Ordinance on army promotions regulates the number of canteen workers and laundresses attached to an army corps; they must be married to an active soldier in that corps, with marriages or retention of widows subject to the regulated number (wives of master craftsmen in the general staff are excluded).
- April 21: For determining beverage outlet taxes in a municipality, proxies represent women.
- April 28: Law amending the Criminal Procedure Code and Penal Code, including provisions on indecent assault, rape, and abortion.

1833

- June 20: Law on primary education (for boys).

1836

- June 23: Ordinance on girls' primary schools; women can become teachers.

1837

- December 22: Ordinance on nursery schools (also called early childhood schools, for children under 6), establishing mixed-sex facilities. A man may direct such an institution, but a woman must always be assigned to it. A committee of "lady inspectors," family mothers appointed by the prefect, appoints directors and inspects and oversees these schools.

1838

- May 28: Bankruptcy and insolvency law provides protections for women's personal assets, but assets acquired by a wife are considered her husband's.

1839

- Ordinance regulating public and private institutions for the mentally ill, mandating separation of sexes for patients and staff, with staff matching the patients' sex.

1842

- August 30: Regency is again barred for women.
- August 30: Ordinances establishing women's teacher training schools in various cities.

1845

- July 18: Law on the slave regime in the colonies (Mackau Laws): A husband can redeem his wife's freedom, but the reverse is not specified.

1846

- June 4: Ordinance on the disciplinary regime for slaves bans corporal punishment for enslaved women.

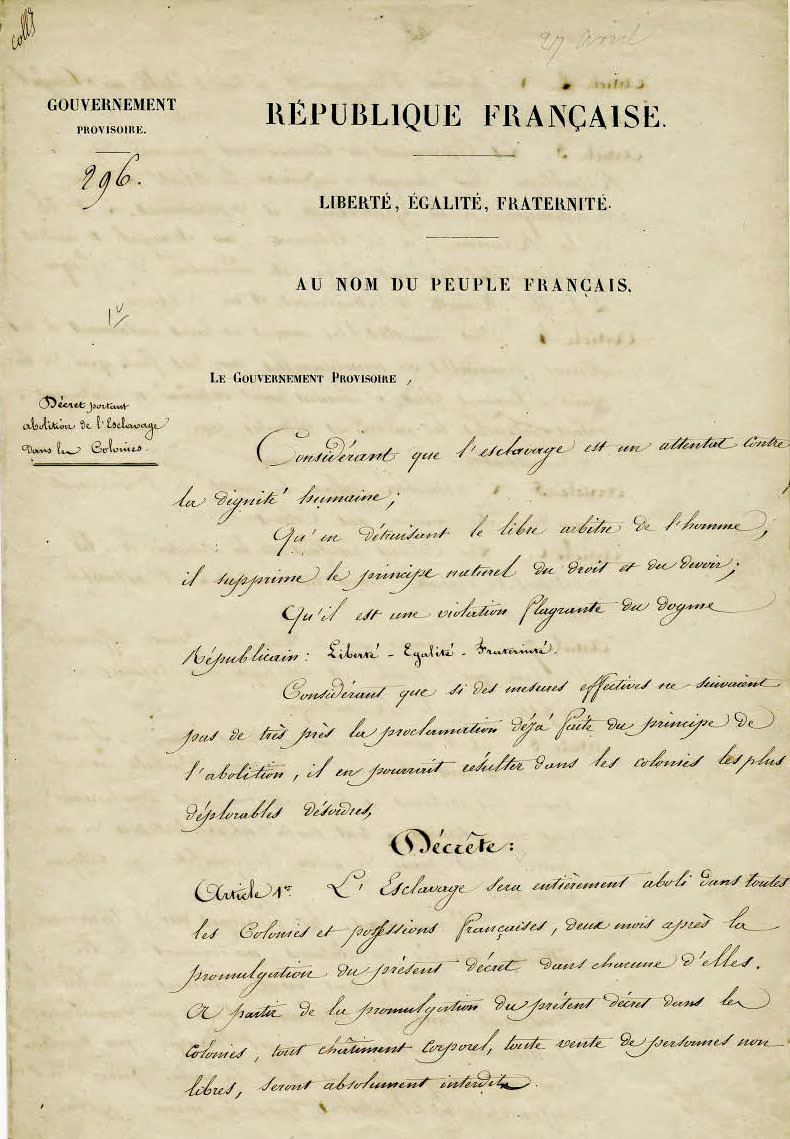
Provisional government decree on the definitive abolition of slavery in the colonies, dated April 27, 1848. National Archives BB-30-1125-A-296.

1848

- April 27: Definitive abolition of slavery with the April 27, 1848, decree.

=== Second Republic ===
1848

- November 4: French Constitution of 1848 establishes universal male suffrage (direct and indirect) for men enjoying civil and political rights, aged 21 to vote and 25 to be eligible.

1850

- March 15: Education Law mandates girls' schools in communes with over 800 inhabitants. Curricula share similarities but differ by sex. Single-sex schooling is the rule, with teachers matching students' sex, except in communes under 800 inhabitants with prefect approval. Children from indigent families receive free education.

=== Second Empire ===
1867

- April 10: Primary Education Law mandates a public girls' school in communes with over 500 inhabitants unless exempted by the Departmental Council. Mixed schools under exemption must be led by a male teacher, though a woman oversees girls' needlework. Communes may offer free schools. Fines or imprisonment are imposed for teachers accepting non-assigned students, except in exempted cases. History and geography become mandatory subjects.

=== Third Republic (1870–1940) ===
- During the Third Republic (1870–1940): Notable civil progress for women, particularly regarding rights and access to education, and the recognition of their necessity as part of the workforce following the First World War.
- May 19, 1874: Law on the labor of children and underage girls employed in industry: work in mines is prohibited for children under 12 and for women; certain industries may employ children aged between 10 and 12, with a daily maximum of 6 hours; outside of this, in all factories, manufacturing plants, and construction sites, the minimum employable age for children is 12—unless the child has a primary education certificate—and the workday must not exceed six hours, with breaks; if the child has a primary education certificate or is at least 15 years old, they may work a maximum of 12 hours per day, with breaks; night work is prohibited for all children under 16 and for young women up to the age of 21 in factories and manufacturing plants.

1875

- July 12: Law concerning freedom of higher education (for boys).
- July 24: "Women of ill repute" are kept away from the gendarmerie.

1879

August 9: Law establishing primary teacher training colleges: each department is required to have one, with a version for training male teachers and another for training female teachers—destined for communal schools.

December 5: Decree organizing the General Inspectorate of Administrative Services of the Ministry of the Interior; among the planned measures is the creation of a post for a female general inspector—her salary is lower than that of her male counterparts; this general inspector is particularly in charge of inspecting girls' penal institutions and women's establishments.

1880

- January 27: Law making gym instruction mandatory in all public education establishments for boys run by the State, Departments, and Municipalities (only for boys).
- December 21: December 21: Law on Secondary Education for Girls, which opens the doors of secondary education to girls, with specific provisions and a different diploma at the end of their studies from the baccalaureate (which boys can obtain).

1881

- April 9: Law establishing the postal savings bank: regardless of her marital status, a wife does not need her husband's permission to open a postal savings account or withdraw money from it—unless the husband expressly objects.
- June 16: Law establishing free primary education in public schools: these also include girls' schools in communes with more than 400 inhabitants.
- August 2: Decree organizing nursery schools—coeducational, they accept children aged 2 to 7; all directors and workers are women; female general and departmental inspectors are assigned to their oversight. Girls are granted access to secondary education, with specific provisions and a diploma different from the baccalaureate (which boys may obtain).

March 28, 1882: Law on mandatory primary education for both boys and girls between the ages of 6 and 13; school curricula differ only in that girls learn needlework and boys take military exercises.

July 27, 1884: Law reinstating divorce.

1885

- May 27: Law on repeat offenders; living off or facilitating the prostitution of others is criminalized.
- November 11: Decree regulating the service and regime of short-sentence prisons assigned to communal incarceration (jails, justice, and correctional institutions): constant separation of male and female detainees; female detainees must be supervised only by women; the chief male warden is the only man allowed to enter a women's prison; in large prisons, special female supervisors are employed, while in smaller ones, the wife of the chief warden or another warden is in charge of overseeing the female detainees.

October 30, 1886: Law on the organization of primary education: boys' schools have male teachers, while girls' schools, nursery schools, early childhood schools, and some mixed schools have female teachers. Women from a school director's family may assist in boys' schools. Any commune with more than 500 inhabitants is required to have a separate school for girls unless mixed education is authorized by the departmental council.

June 26, 1889: Law on nationality.

June 15, 1891: A decree allows "lady inspectors" to inspect penal institutions for women and girls.

1892

- November 2: Law on the labor of children, underage girls, and women in industrial establishments.
- November 30: Law on the practice of medicine: midwives are prohibited from prescribing medication, they may administer smallpox vaccines, and during childbirth, they are forbidden from using instruments and must call a physician or health officer in case of complications.

1893

- February 6: Law modifying the rules for legal separation.
- July 15: Law on free medical assistance for people without means: women giving birth are considered equivalent to sick persons.
- August 19: A law concerning fire safety measures in certain regions of France holds the husband civilly liable for offenses and violations committed by his wife.

July 20, 1895: Law on savings banks.

December 7, 1897: Law granting women the right to be witnesses in civil status acts and in official documents in general.

1898

- January 23: Law granting women the right to vote in elections for commercial courts.
- April 1: Law on mutual aid societies: these can notably be founded by women, and if the woman is married, she does not need her husband's involvement to do so.

1900

- March 30: Law modifying the law of November 2, 1892, on labor by children, underage girls, and women in industrial establishments: the maximum daily working hours for minors under 18 and for women is reduced to 10 hours.
- December 1: Law allowing women with a university degree (license) to take the oath as lawyers and practice the profession.
- December 29: Law defining working conditions for women employed in shops, stores, and related premises.

March 31, 1902: Decree creating Agricultural Chambers in Algeria: in elections to these chambers, French women who retain their civil rights (i.e., single, divorced or legally separated, or widowed) may vote (but are not eligible to be elected).

1903

- March 14: A decree provides that Chambers of Commerce and Consultative Chambers of Arts and Manufacturing include women among both voters and eligible candidates.
- April 3: Law modifying Articles 334 and 335 of the Penal Code and Articles 5 and 7 of the Code of Criminal Procedure; notably amends provisions relating to pimping, the corruption of minors, incitement to debauchery, corruption of youth, and international trafficking.

December 15, 1904: Abolition of the ban on marrying the "accomplice in adultery."

February 7, 1905: Decree implementing the international agreement aimed at effectively protecting against the criminal trade known as "white slavery" (international agreement from May 1904).

1907

- March 27: Law on labor courts; women are granted the right to vote but not to be elected.
- July 13: Laws relating to the [unclear reference: "lire"] salary of married women and the contribution of spouses to household expenses.
- July 19: Law abolishing the deportation of repeat-offending women to penal colonies.

1908

- April 11: Law concerning the prostitution of minors (under 18 years old).
- June 6: Law allowing for the automatic conversion of legal separation into divorce after three years.
- November 15: Women become eligible to serve on labor tribunals (Conseils de prud'hommes).

September 27, 1909: Law guaranteeing employment or job security for women after childbirth — employment contracts may be suspended for eight consecutive weeks.

March 15, 1910: Law granting a special two-month leave, with full pay, to schoolteachers after childbirth — this corresponds to maternity leave.

July 13, 1911: The two-month maternity leave granted to schoolteachers is extended to women employed by the postal, telegraph, and telephone services (PTT).

1912

- August 23: Decree enacting the International Convention for the Suppression of the White Slave Traffic (signed on May 4, 1910).
- November 16: Law amending Article 340 of the Civil Code (Judicial recognition of natural paternity).
- December 23: The administrative boards of public low-income housing offices (Habitations à Bon Marché, HBM) are opened to women.

June 17, 1913: Law on postpartum rest for women.

August 5, 1914: Law granting allowances to needy families during the war if the breadwinner is conscripted or recalled to military service (France declared general mobilization on August 2 and entered World War I that same month).

1916

- February 2: Decree establishing an agricultural action committee in every rural municipality and cantonal agricultural organization committees; women managing such farms have the right to vote in these committees.
- December 27: Law increasing penalties for specific forms of vagrancy; this notably concerns procuring.

1917

- January 23: Law granting an additional benefit to pregnant women already receiving allowances under the law of August 5, 1914.
- June 18: Law amending the law of April 7, 1915, authorizing the government to revoke naturalization decrees of former nationals of enemy countries: naturalized persons from a country at war with France can be stripped of French nationality, and this loss may extend to the wife and children depending on circumstances.
- July 27: Law establishing "Wards of the Nation"; women may hold positions in national and departmental offices.
- August 5: Law concerning breastfeeding in industrial and commercial establishments.
- October 1: Law on the repression of public drunkenness and regulation of drinking establishments; part of a campaign against clandestine prostitution by both women and men. Additionally, girls under 18 may no longer work in drinking establishments unless they are family members of the owner.

1919

- March 19: Law facilitating donations to public or private charitable organizations, particularly those focused on increasing birth rates and protecting children and war orphans.
- April 23: Decree implementing the law of April 23, 1919, establishing an eight-hour workday in hotels, restaurants, cafés, and other food service establishments in the Paris region.
- May 9: Decree modifying the statutes of the Comédie-Française: both principal and substitute members must include at least one woman in each group.
- June 1: Circular regulating prostitution among women.
- July 25: Decree on the regulation of films; women may sit on the commission that grants film distribution visas.
- August 9: Competitive exams for editorial and translator-editor positions in the central administration of commerce and industry are opened to women for a provisional period of three years.
- August 27: Competitive exams for editorial and calculation clerk positions in the central administration of the Ministry of Labor and Social Welfare are opened to female candidates.
- October 24: Law protecting breastfeeding women: needy mothers breastfeeding their infants receive special allowances during the first year.
- October 25: Law creating and organizing chambers of agriculture in each French department; women with agricultural professions (or who had such work during the war) may vote and be elected.

1920

- March 12: Law expanding the civil capacity of professional unions; married women may join and participate (including in administration and leadership) without their husband's permission.
- July 31: Law criminalizing incitement to abortion and anti-contraceptive propaganda.
- August 12: Decree enacting the Peace Treaty of November 27, 1919, which created the League of Nations (SDN) and established principles such as the prohibition of child labor, restrictions on youth labor for both sexes, and "equal pay for equal work"; women may be technical advisors within the SDN on certain topics.

1921

- March 24: Law concerning the vagrancy of minors under eighteen years of age. (in the Official Journal of March 28–29–30, 1921).
- July 24: Law preventing and settling conflicts between French law and local Alsace-Lorraine law in private matters: the applicable law for a married woman is that which applies to her husband (regarding status and legal capacity).

December 20, 1922: Law amending Articles 334 and 335 of the Penal Code to include punishment for attempted offenses related to the so-called "trafficking of women."

1923

- January 19: Decree establishing internal rules and organization of work in prisons designated for individual confinement.
- March 27: Law amending Article 317 of the Penal Code regarding abortion.
- June 19: Law amending various articles of the Civil Code concerning adoption.
- June 29: Decree regulating the service and rules of prisons for communal confinement.
- November 12: Decree regulating gambling clubs: women are prohibited from entering.

1924

- February 7: Law punishing the crime of family abandonment.
- March 25: Decree reforming the curriculum of secondary education for girls: this education is reorganized to lead to a secondary school diploma under the standard program, or to the baccalaureate with additional optional subjects. While the education of girls is aligned with that of boys, it includes extra classes in needlework, home economics, and music.
- April 20: The role of auctioneer is opened to women.
- June 21: Law codifying labor laws; part of the Labor Code is affected.
- June 25: Decree on the conditions for hosting Wards of the Nation in families or institutions: any facility hosting a female ward (of any age) or a boy under 13 must include at least one woman on staff.
- December 11: Law granting women merchants eligibility to serve on chambers of commerce.

1925

- January 16: Establishment of a National Economic Council — any Frenchwoman over 25 may become a member.
- March 20: Decree amending the decree of July 28, 1906, concerning the staff of the departmental inspection of public assistance, allowing women to compete for the role of deputy inspector.

1926

- March 11: Decree improving breastfeeding conditions in industrial and commercial establishments (dedicated rooms, breastfeeding facilities, cribs, and qualified staff).
- December 3: Decree enacting the International Convention for the Suppression of the Traffic in Women and Children (signed September 30, 1921); France adhered in January 1926 with reservations regarding colonies, protectorates, or mandates.
- December 7: Law amending Article 72 of Book II of the Labor and Social Welfare Code (list of jobs prohibited to children under 18 and to women).
- December 1: Maritime Labor Code; a married woman may not board a ship without her husband's permission—or court authorization.

1927

- February 20: Decrees enacting the Conventions on the night work of women and of children in industry, drawn up in Washington by the International Labor Conference and signed in Paris on January 24, 1921, by France and Belgium, along with their annexed protocol.
- August 10: Nationality law.
- December 6: Decree on the regulations of the École nationale supérieure de céramique in Sèvres, reserved for boys.

1928

- January 4: Law amending Article 29 of Book I of the Labor and Social Welfare Code concerning maternity leave.
- March 19: Two-month fully paid maternity leave for schoolteachers and PTT employees is extended to all female civil servants.
- March 21: Law reforming the retirement schemes for workers in state industrial establishments — the rules differ based on the worker's sex and other factors.
- April 5: Social insurance law: includes specific provisions for salaried pregnant women and breastfeeding mothers, or those unable to breastfeed for medical reasons.
- December 28: Order establishing departmental committees for the aid and protection of immigrant women.

July 3, 1929: Circular reorganizing hygiene clinics to ensure better sanitary oversight of prostitution.

August 24, 1930: Decree enacting the Convention on the Nationality of Married Women (signed in Paris on September 12, 1928, between France and Belgium).

December 9, 1931: Law granting female merchants eligibility to serve as judges in commercial courts.

1932

- March 11: Law that generalizes family allowances, among other measures.
- October 24: Decree establishing trade counselors, a role open to women.

1935

- April 9: Decree setting the structure, staffing, status, and pay for laboratory personnel (under the Ministry of Public Health): women may be assistants but may not hold leadership positions, nor the roles of head technician or "lab boy."
- October 30: Decree on child protection.
- October 30: Decree amending Articles 376 and following of the Civil Code; modifies the "right of parental discipline" — for both father and mother — and the terms and duration of placing a child under care.

1936

- March 27: The Popular Front, then in power, creates various positions of Undersecretary of State, three of which are assigned to: Cécile Brunschvicg (National Education), Suzanne Lacore (Public Health), and Irène Joliot-Curie (Scientific Research).
- April 20: Law specifying, among other things, that the Escapees' Medal can be awarded to women; the War Cross cannot.
- July 23: Implementation decree of the law establishing the National Economic Council, in which women can sit under the same conditions as their male counterparts.
- October 29: Decree amending the decree of August 10, 1920, concerning the establishment, operation, and supervision of sanatoriums; a female doctor may be an assistant physician in all of them, and director in those intended for women and children.

1937

- May 31: Decree regarding the admission of women to the role of Foreign Trade Advisor.
- June 14: The issuance of a passport no longer requires a husband's authorization for a married woman.
- September 30: Decree establishing a Higher Council for Child Protection.

1938

- February 18: Law amending the Civil Code texts related to the legal capacity of married women.
- March 21: Order from the Ministry of Labor making binding the collective agreement for the wholesale wine and spirits trade in the Libourne district: within this agreement, wages differ notably based on the employee's gender (women receiving a "female wage," systematically lower than their male counterparts) — "this example of a collective agreement shows that the notion of 'female wage,' significantly lower than that of men, is embedded in the legal system of the time."
- April 9: Law regarding the promotion of female assistant inspectors in public welfare to the rank of inspector.
- November 12: Decree-law aimed at encouraging birth rates.

1939

- July 29: Decree-law on family and French natality.
- November 29: The conversion of legal separation into divorce sees its delay temporarily reduced to one year during the war (Second World War).
- November 29: Decree concerning the prevention of venereal diseases.

Vichy Regime (July 1940-August 1944)

October 11, 1940: Law on women's work — aimed at combating unemployment; notably prohibits the hiring of married women in the administration.

1941

- February 15: Law amending the decree of July 29, 1939, on family and French natality.
- March 29: Law creating a single wage allowance (ASU).
- April 2: Law on divorce and legal separation.
- September 2: Law on birth protection.
- September 14: Law concerning sentence adjustments.

1942

- February 15: Law on the repression of abortion, considered a crime against the interests of the state.
- August 6: Law amending article 344 of the Penal Code, concerning, among other things, inciting a minor to debauchery, as well as certain acts during consensual homosexual relations between a minor and an adult (but not in the case of similar acts within heterosexual relations).
- September 12: Law on women's work, again allowing the hiring of married women in the administration (suspending the previous law on the subject).
- September 22: Law on the effects of marriage regarding the rights and duties of spouses.
- December 16: Law on maternity and early childhood protection.
- December 23: Law aiming to "protect the dignity of the household from which the husband is absent due to wartime circumstances."

1943

- February 1: Law on payments by check and bank transfer.
- March 2: Law against pimps.

1944

- January 11: Decree on the creation of auxiliary women's military units (land, air, and naval forces).

=== Second Half of the 20th Century ===
Women increasingly demand equality with men in social, economic, and political rights.

=== Provisional Government of the French Republic ===
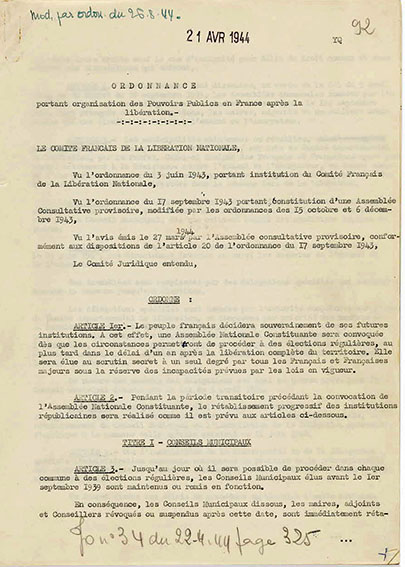
Ordinance establishing the organization of public authorities in France after the Liberation, April 21, 1944. National Archives A//1902. This ordinance also granted women the right to vote.

- April 21, 1944: Women are granted the right to vote and to stand for election, by ordinance of the Provisional Government of the French Republic then located in Algiers.
- April 12, 1945: Ordinance on divorce and legal separation.
- April 29, 1945: First vote with women participating as voters, during municipal elections.
- September 1, 1945: Ordinance on paternal correction, notably abolishing the "right to paternal correction."
- October 4, 1945: Ordinance establishing Social Security; its provisions include the creation of mandatory maternity leave (14 weeks) with compensation amounting to half of the salary.
- October 9, 1945: Creation of the National School of Administration (ENA), which accepts women, provided they do not seek positions strictly reserved for men.
- October 19, 1945: Ordinance establishing the French Nationality Code.
- November 2, 1945: Ordinance on maternal and child protection.
- April 11, 1946: Law allowing women to access the judiciary.
- April 13, 1946: Ban on brothels and strengthening the fight against pimping, by the so-called "Marthe Richard law."
- April 24, 1946: Law establishing a sanitary and social registry of prostitution.
- May 18, 1946: Law granting an additional leave to heads of household, whether salaried, civil servants, or public service agents, for each birth in their household.
- July 30, 1946: Order repealing provisions allowing wage reductions for "female wages."
- August 22, 1946: Law establishing the family benefits system.
- October 27, 1946: The Preamble to the Constitution of October 27, 1946, establishes the Fourth Republic in France; it includes in paragraph 3 the statement: "The law guarantees women equal rights with men in all areas."

=== Fourth Republic ===
- June 27, 1947: Decree creating the medical code of ethics; it includes provisions on therapeutic abortion.
- November 1947: Germaine Poinso-Chapuis becomes France's first female minister, for Public Health and Population; the second female minister in the country will be Simone Veil in 1974.
- November 5, 1947: Decree implementing the April 24, 1946, law establishing a sanitary and social registry of prostitution.
- September 1, 1948: Law modifying and codifying legislation on relations between landlords and tenants or occupants of residential or professional premises and establishing housing allowances.
- August 11, 1950: Law publishing ILO Convention No. 3 (adopted on November 29, 1919) and authorizing its ratification; this convention concerns the employment of pregnant and newly delivered women.
- October 15, 1951: Decree on the status of female military personnel.
- December 10, 1952: Law authorizing the ratification of ILO Convention No. 100, concerning "equal remuneration for men and women for work of equal value."
- May 17, 1954: Decree on the family record book: contents and definitions of the records and extracts to be included.
- August 6, 1955: Law setting the supplementary budget for agricultural family benefits for fiscal years 1955 and 1956; notably establishes a "housewife allowance," granted to the "head of household" under certain conditions.
- November 28, 1955: Decree on the medical code of ethics, modifying the previous one.
- 1956: The association "La Maternité Heureuse," which would become the French Movement for Family Planning (MFPF) in 1960, is founded; its goals include sex education and advocacy for the right to contraception and abortion.
- December 11, 1956: Law on the housewife allowance, extended beyond agricultural professions.
- March 25, 1957: Treaty of Rome establishing the European Economic Community; it includes a principle of equal pay for men and women for identical work.

=== Fifth Republic ===
- December 23, 1958: Decree amending various criminal provisions to introduce a fifth class of police contraventions; notably punishes passive soliciting.
- December 30, 1958: The term "birth allowance" replaces "maternity allowance," and the conditions for both that and the single wage allowance are modified.
- February 4, 1959: Ordinance on the general status of civil servants, which includes the principle of non-discrimination based on sex, except in certain exceptional cases, notably in the national police.
- April 9, 1960: Decree concerning the family record book.
- November 25, 1960: Ordinance on the fight against pimping.
- November 25, 1960: By decree, passive soliciting becomes a 3rd-class offense, active soliciting a 5th-class offense.
- December 2, 1960: France ratifies the United Nations Convention for the Suppression of the Traffic in Persons and of the Exploitation of the Prostitution of Others; the sanitary and social registry of prostitutes — created by law on April 24, 1946, and listing about 30,000 people in 1960 — is abolished.
- July 13, 1965: Law reforming matrimonial regimes: modification of the legal regime for marriages without a contract: the wife is free to manage her own property and pursue professional activity, no longer needing her husband's consent.
- September 29, 1965: Order establishing a study and liaison committee on women's labor issues.
- July 11, 1966: Law reforming adoption.
- December 30, 1966: Law on job protection in cases of maternity.
- December 28, 1967: Authorization of contraception by the Neuwirth Law; however, its implementation decrees would not be published until 1971.
- January 24, 1968: Decree on common provisions applicable to civil servants in the active services of the national police: unless an exception is made, a woman cannot be appointed to a position within the active services.
- May 24, 1969: Decree setting the amount of the single salary allowance and the stay-at-home mother's allowance.
- June 4, 1970: In the Civil Code, "joint parental authority" replaces "paternal authority," and "both spouses jointly ensure the moral and material guidance of the family."
- July 15, 1970: Law concerning the École Polytechnique, which notably allows women to take the entrance exam and sets the conditions for their employment after graduation.
- August 26, 1970: Founding of the Women's Liberation Movement (MLF), marked by the laying of a wreath "to the wife of the unknown soldier" on the Tomb of the Unknown Soldier beneath the Arc de Triomphe in Paris.
- December 23, 1970: Decree increasing the rate of daily rest allowances for maternity insurance under the general social security system.
- April 5, 1971: Publication of the "Manifesto of the 343" in Le Nouvel Observateur: signed by 343 women — including celebrities — declaring they had undergone an abortion and demanding the right to free abortion.
- April 16, 1971: Ministerial order regarding the Women's Work Committee, replacing the Study and Liaison Committee on Women's Work Issues.
- June 10, 1971: Law on parentage.
- July 1971: The association "Choisir la cause des femmes" is created — with philosopher Simone de Beauvoir and lawyer Gisèle Halimi — to demand the repeal of the 1920 law criminalizing abortion.
- January 3, 1972: Law on parentage. It opens the right for the mother to challenge, under certain conditions, the presumption of the husband's paternity.
- January 3, 1972: Law on the stay-at-home mother's allowance.
- April 24, 1972: Decree applying Article 4 of Law 67-1176 of December 28, 1967, on birth control and repealing Articles L. 648 and L. 649 of the Public Health Code.
- July 13, 1972: Law establishing the general status of military personnel; access to military careers is not subject to sex-based discrimination.
- August 16, 1972: Decree on the specific status of the corps of national police inspectors, in which women are allowed to apply.
- December 22, 1972: Law affirming the principle of equal pay between genders.
- January 2, 1973: Law on the Labor Code, which updates it and includes provisions on women's work.
- January 9, 1973: Law amending and supplementing the French Nationality Code and concerning certain provisions related to French nationality; it notably authorizes the transmission of nationality by the mother to her child, whether the child is "legitimate or illegitimate."
- March 23, 1973: Decree establishing the special status of female military corps.
- April 1973: The Movement for the Freedom of Abortion and Contraception (MLAC) is created; it includes feminist and political organizations and announces the practice of then-illegal abortions (Karman method) and group trips abroad for abortion.
- July 11, 1973: Creation of the Higher Council for Sexual Information, Birth Control, and Family Education.
- October 8, 1973: Ministerial order extending national agreements concluded in the metallurgy sector; part of it concerns maternity leave compensation.
- May 1974: Simone Veil becomes Minister of Health; five other women serve as Secretaries of State between 1974 and 1976.
- July 16, 1974: Creation of the back-to-school allowance.
- July 23, 1974: The State Secretariat for the Status of Women is created; attached to the Prime Minister, it is assigned to Françoise Giroud.
- December 4, 1974: Law with various provisions regarding birth control.
- January 17, 1975: Law of January 17, 1975 on voluntary termination of pregnancy (abortion), also called the "Veil Law," which decriminalizes abortion; adopted for a five-year trial period. Its implementing decree was published on May 13, 1975, providing further details.
- July 10, 1975: Law amending Article 7 of Ordinance 59-244 of February 4, 1959 (no distinction is made between men and women for the application of this ordinance, except in certain cases where exclusive recruitment of men or women may be planned).
- July 11, 1975: Law reforming divorce.
- July 11, 1975: Law on education (Haby Law); compulsory schooling applies to both boys and girls from ages 6 to 16, with no difference in education between them, and coeducation is required.
- July 11, 1975: Law amending and supplementing the Labor Code regarding special rules for women's work, as well as Article L298 of the Social Security Code and Articles 187-1 and 416 of the Penal Code.
- July 15, 1975: Legal authorization of divorce by mutual consent.
- December 31, 1979: Law permanently extending the provisions of the 1975 "Veil Law," while also removing some obstacles to access to abortion.
- April 29, 1976: Decree on the conditions of entry and stay in France for family members of foreigners authorized to reside in France.
- July 9, 1976: Law with various social protection measures for the family.
- September 21, 1976: Decree on the Delegate for Women's Status, replacing the Secretary of State for Women's Status.
- December 22, 1976: Law amending certain provisions on adoption.
- December 28, 1976: Decree on the organization of training in nursery and primary schools.
- July 12, 1977: Law establishing a family supplement replacing the single salary allowance, the stay-at-home mother's allowance, and the childcare allowance as of January 1, 1978.
- July 12, 1977: Law establishing parental education leave.
- November 10, 1977: Decree establishing a family supplement replacing the single salary allowance, the stay-at-home mother's allowance, and the childcare allowance as of January 1, 1978.
- April 13, 1978: Creation of the State Secretariat for Women's Employment, attached to the Ministry of Labor and Participation; assigned to Nicole Pasquier.
- July 12, 1978: Law with various measures in favor of maternity.
- July 26, 1978: Decree amending Decree 68-92 of January 29, 1968, on the special status of police officers and peacekeepers of the national police; women may apply.
- September 11, 1978: Creation of the Ministry Delegate for Women's Status, replacing the delegation for women's status; assigned to Monique Pelletier.
- January 2, 1979: Law on working hours and night work for women.
- December 31, 1979: Law on voluntary termination of pregnancy, completing the January 1975 law.
- July 17, 1980: Law with various provisions to improve the situation of large families.
- December 23, 1980: Law on the punishment of rape and certain sexual offenses; rape is defined as: "Any act of sexual penetration, of any kind, committed on another person by violence, coercion, threat, or surprise, is rape"; it becomes a crime.
- September 30, 1981: Decree on the responsibilities of the Minister Delegate to the Prime Minister, Minister for Women's Rights, Mme Yvette Roudy.
- October 12, 1981: Publication of three decrees: abortion reimbursed at 75%, residency requirement shortened for foreign women, all public healthcare institutions required to have an abortion center; and a national contraception awareness campaign launched by Minister Yvette Roudy.
- January 20, 1982: March 8 becomes Women's Day in France, on the proposal of Yvette Roudy and accepted by the Council of Ministers.
- March 2, 1982: Decree on the Interministerial Committee for Women's Rights.
- March 8, 1982: First national Women's Day in France; announcement of several upcoming measures on women's rights (abortion reimbursed at 100%, women's quotas in municipal and regional elections — ruled unconstitutional in 1982 —, system for recovering unpaid alimony, proposed laws against sexism and for gender equality in employment, new status of "co-farmer," and disappearance of the "head of household" notion); the Legion of Honor includes a special class of working women.
- April 1982: The law on the general status of civil servants enshrines the principle of equal access to public employment.
- May 7, 1982: Law amending Article 7 of Ordinance 59-244 of February 4, 1959, on the general status of civil servants and containing various provisions on the principle of equal access to public employment.
- July 10, 1982: Law on the spouses of artisans and shopkeepers working in the family business.
- August 4, 1982: Law repealing Article 331 (paragraph 2) of the Penal Code; as a result, indecent or unnatural acts with a minor of the same sex (homosexuality) are no longer punishable by correctional penalties.
- December 29, 1982: Finance law for 1983. It includes the removal of the "head of household" concept from the General Tax Code.
- December 31, 1982: The cost of abortion is covered by health insurance and the State.
- July 1, 1983: Law authorizing the ratification of a Convention on the Elimination of All Forms of Discrimination Against Women, opened for signature in New York on March 1, 1980.
- July 13, 1983: Law on the rights and obligations of civil servants.
- July 13, 1983: Law amending the Labor Code and the Penal Code concerning professional equality between women and men (Roudy Law): gender equality in the workplace.
- January 4, 1984: Law amending the Labor Code concerning parental education leave and part-time work for parents of young children.
- February 29, 1984: Decree creating, under the Minister Delegate to the Prime Minister for Women's Rights, a terminology commission responsible for studying the feminization of titles and functions, and more generally, vocabulary concerning women's activities.
- May 7, 1984: Law on acquiring French nationality through marriage.
- July 12, 1984: Bill concerning alimony.
- December 4, 1984: Decree on work permits issued to foreign workers.
- December 22, 1984: Law on the intervention of family benefits agencies for recovering unpaid alimony.
- January 4, 1985: Law on measures in favor of young families and large families.
- May 31, 1985: Decree on the responsibilities of the Minister for Women's Rights; this results in the ministry's autonomy.
- December 23, 1985: Law establishing equality between spouses in matrimonial regimes and between parents in managing the property of their minor children.
- January 6, 1986: Law adapting health and social legislation to the transfer of responsibilities in social and health assistance.
- March 11, 1986: Circular on the feminization of job titles, roles, ranks, or honors.
- May 2, 1986: Decree concerning the Delegate for Women's Affairs.
- December 29, 1986: Law relating to the family.
- June 19, 1987: Law concerning the duration and organization of working time.
- July 22, 1987: Law on the exercise of parental authority.
- July 18, 1988: Creation of the Secretary of State for Women's Rights, assigned to Michèle André.
- December 28, 1988: Order concerning the possession, distribution, dispensing, and administration of the drug Mifepristone 200 mg tablets.
- May 16, 1989: Decree removing the managerial and technical staff of the prison administration's external services from the list of positions for which separate recruitment could be planned for men and women.
- July 10, 1989: Framework law on education.
- July 10, 1989: Law on the prevention of child abuse and the protection of children.
- February 20, 1990: Order amending the order of November 3, 1988, concerning the prices of care and hospitalization related to voluntary termination of pregnancy.
- July 6, 1990: Law amending the Social Security Code and relating to family benefits and employment assistance for the care of young children.
- September 5, 1990: Marital rape is recognized for the first time by the Court of Cassation.
- December 21, 1990: The Council of State validates the conformity of the 1975 Veil Law with the European Convention on Human Rights.
- January 18, 1991: Law containing provisions relating to public health and social insurance.
- January 31, 1991: Decree concerning the responsibilities of the Secretary of State for Women's Rights and Daily Life, delegated by the Minister of Labour, Employment, and Vocational Training.
- May 1991: Édith Cresson becomes the first female Prime Minister of France.
- May 21, 1992: Decree concerning the responsibilities of the Secretary of State for Women's Rights and Consumer Affairs.
- July 22, 1992: Law reforming the provisions of the Penal Code relating to the repression of crimes and offenses against persons.
- November 2, 1992: Law concerning abuse of authority in sexual matters in work relationships and amending the Labour Code and the Code of Criminal Procedure.
- January 8, 1992: Law amending the Civil Code concerning civil status, family, and children's rights, and establishing the family affairs judge.
- January 27, 1993: Law concerning various social measures, notably establishing the offense of obstructing abortion and decriminalizing self-induced abortion.
- April 8, 1993: Decree concerning the responsibilities of the Minister of State, Minister of Social Affairs, Health, and the City.
- July 22, 1993: Law reforming nationality law.
- August 2, 1993: Law concerning the control of immigration and the conditions of entry, reception, and residence of foreigners in France.
- April 21, 1994: Discussion on the possibility of quotas and potential gender parity in the exercise of responsibilities, particularly political ones.
- July 15, 1994: Law concerning the family.
- July 29, 1994: Law concerning respect for the human body.
- July 29, 1994: Law concerning the donation and use of elements and products of the human body, medically assisted procreation, and prenatal diagnosis.
- June 1, 1995: Decree concerning the responsibilities of the Minister for Intergenerational Solidarity.
- October 18, 1995: Creation of the Observatory for Gender Parity.
- December 7, 1995: Decree concerning the responsibilities of the Minister Delegate for Employment.
- June 6, 1996: Manifesto for gender parity published in L'Express; ten women, including former prominent ministers, are its authors.
- July 5, 1996: Law concerning adoption.
- January 14, 1997: Publication of selected excerpts from lawyer Gisèle Halimi's report to the Prime Minister on gender inequalities (social, economic, political), which undermine aspects of democracy; the report also proposes various solutions to reduce these inequalities and promote better democracy.
- June 11, 1997: Decree concerning the responsibilities of the Minister of Employment and Solidarity.
- December 19, 1997: Social Security Financing Law for 1998; it includes provisions relating to the family.
- March 8, 1998: Circular concerning the feminization of job titles, functions, ranks, or titles.
- March 16, 1998: Law concerning nationality.
- May 11, 1998: Law concerning the entry and residence of foreigners in France and the right of asylum.
- June 17, 1998: Constitutional bill for gender equality, including possibilities for measures promoting gender parity in political positions.
- June 17, 1998: Law concerning the prevention and repression of sexual offenses and the protection of minors.
- November 17, 1998: A State Secretariat for Women's Rights and Vocational Training is delegated to the Ministry of Employment and Solidarity.
- December 23, 1998: Social Security Financing Law for 1999, notably modifying certain elements relating to family allowances and the back-to-school allowance.
- July 8, 1999: Constitutional law concerning equality between women and men.
- March 23, 1999: Law authorizing the ratification of the Treaty of Amsterdam amending the Treaty on European Union, the treaties establishing the European Communities, and certain related acts; the European Union includes missions to promote gender equality.
- July 8, 1999: Law concerning equality between women and men.
- July 12, 1999: Law concerning the creation of parliamentary delegations for women's rights and equal opportunities between men and women.
- September 2, 1999: Report on gender inequalities at work, submitted by MP Catherine Génisson to the Prime Minister: the report presents various findings and proposes ways to reduce inequalities.
- December 8, 1999: Bill aimed at promoting equal access for women and men to electoral mandates and elective functions; organic bill aimed at promoting equal access for women and men to mandates as members of provincial assemblies and the Congress of New Caledonia, the Assembly of French Polynesia, and the Territorial Assembly of the Wallis and Futuna Islands.

=== 21st century ===
The 21st century was marked by the expansion of birth control. On June 15, 2000, the residency requirement for foreign women seeking an abortion was abolished, and on December 13, a law was passed that allows emergency contraception ("morning-after pill") to be issued to minors without parental consent. On July 4, 2001, the legal period for abortion was extended from 10 to 12 weeks, and then from 12 to 14 weeks on February 23, 2022. On December 6th, 2006, a report from the High Council for Population and Family, recommended free and anonymous contraception for minors. On March 25, 2013, a law was passed which includes full reimbursement of abortion and free access to medical contraception for minors over 15. On August 25, 2020, free contraception was extended to girls under the age of 15. On December 6, 2013, a law was enacted authorizing the trial of birthing centers.

- June 6, 2000: Law in favor of equal access for women and men to electoral mandates and elective functions.
- June 30, 2000: Law concerning compensatory allowance in divorce matters.
- July 10, 2000: Law concerning the election of senators, with measures regarding gender parity.
- November 28, 2000: Government amendment lifting the ban on night work for women, against the opinion of the French Communist Party (PCF), which wanted to ban night work for all, except for exemptions.
- December 23, 2000: Social Security Financing Law for 2001, which includes the creation of a parental presence allowance in case of illness, accident, or disability of the child.
- May 9, 2001: Law concerning professional equality between women and men.
- November 16, 2001: Law concerning the fight against discrimination.
- December 3, 2001: Law concerning the rights of the surviving spouse and illegitimate children, and modernizing various provisions of inheritance law.
- December 21, 2001: Social Security Financing Act for 2002, which notably includes the establishment of paternity leave.
- December 21, 2001: Decree establishing a National Commission against Violence towards Women.
- January 9, 2002: Decree regarding the provision of emergency contraception medication to minors.
- January 17, 2002: Social Modernization Act, which notably includes elements related to sexual harassment, as well as others concerning discrimination in housing.
- January 22, 2002: Law concerning access to origins for adopted individuals and wards of the state.
- March 4, 2002: Law concerning patients' rights and the quality of the healthcare system.
- March 4, 2002: Law concerning family names: the concept of patronymic name is replaced by that of family name; father and mother can give their family name to their child, according to different modalities (choice of one or the other, or combination of both in an order they have defined).
- March 4, 2002: Law concerning parental authority.
- July 1, 2002: Creation of the Ministry Delegate for Parity and Professional Equality.
- March 18, 2003: Law for internal security; it includes elements related to passive solicitation, and others creating the "aggravating circumstance of committing a crime or offense due to the victim's sexual orientation."
- April 11, 2003: Law concerning the election of regional councilors and representatives to the European Parliament, as well as public aid to political parties; rule of alternating candidates of each gender on electoral lists.
- June 18, 2003: Law concerning the transmission of family names.
- July 30, 2003: Law reforming the election of senators, which includes elements related to representation and parity.
- November 26, 2003: Law concerning the control of immigration, the residence of foreigners in France, and nationality.
- December 18, 2003: Social Security Financing Act for 2004.
- March 15, 2004: Law regulating, in application of the principle of secularism, the wearing of signs or outfits manifesting religious affiliation in public schools, colleges, and high schools.
- March 31, 2004: The Ministry Delegate for Parity and Professional Equality gains its autonomy.
- May 26, 2004: Law concerning divorce; the protection of the spouse victim of violence is taken into account.
- July 1, 2004: Decree concerning the conditions for performing voluntary terminations of pregnancy outside healthcare establishments and amending the Public Health Code (second part: Regulatory part).
- August 6, 2004: Law concerning bioethics.
- November 24, 2004: Plan to combat violence against women.
- November 24, 2004: Ordinance concerning the legislative part of the Code on the Entry and Residence of Foreigners and the Right of Asylum.
- March 23, 2006: Law concerning equal pay between women and men.
- April 5, 2006: Law on strengthening the prevention and repression of violence within couples or against minors.
- December 30, 2004: Law establishing the French Equal Opportunities and Anti-Discrimination Commission (HALDE).
- March 17, 2005: Decree concerning the family reunification of foreigners for the application of Book IV of the Code on the Entry and Residence of Foreigners and the Right of Asylum.
- April 2, 2005: Orientation and Program Law for the Future of the School, which emphasizes that it must "promote coeducation and equality between men and women."
- June 2, 2005: Creation of the Ministry Delegate for Social Cohesion and Parity.
- July 4, 2005: Ordinance reforming filiation.
- August 2, 2005: Law in favor of small and medium-sized enterprises; it notably includes provisions concerning the status of the collaborating spouse.
- December 12, 2005: Law concerning the treatment of repeat offenses.
- March 23, 2006: Law concerning equal pay between women and men.
- March 31, 2006: Law for equal opportunities.
- April 4, 2006: Law strengthening the prevention and repression of violence within couples or committed against minors.
- July 24, 2006: Law concerning immigration and integration.
- January 31, 2007: Law aiming to promote equal access for women and men to electoral mandates and elective functions (mandatory parity for municipalities with more than 3,500 inhabitants and in regional executives; alternates for general councilors, both of different genders; reduced public aid for a political party in case of non-compliance with parity for legislative election candidacies). This law will be followed by the laws of February 26 and July 23, 2008, concerning the facilitation of equal access between women and men to certain mandates and elected functions, as well as to social and professional responsibilities.
- March 5, 2007: Law concerning the prevention of delinquency.
- March 14, 2007: Creation of "3919," a national telephone number for victims and witnesses of domestic violence.
- April 13, 2007: Decree concerning the methods of calculation and sharing of family allowances in the case of alternating residence of children at each parent's home and amending the Social Security Code (second part: Decrees in the Council of State).
- August 1, 2007: Law authorizing the ratification of the Council of Europe Convention on Action against Trafficking in Human Beings.
- November 20, 2007: Law concerning the control of immigration, integration, and asylum.
- December 17, 2007: Law containing various provisions adapting to Community law in economic and financial matters.
- January 21, 2008: Law ratifying Ordinance No. 2007-329 of March 12, 2007, concerning the Labor Code (legislative part).
- February 26, 2008: Law facilitating equal access for women and men to the mandate of general councilor.
- May 27, 2008: Law containing various provisions adapting to Community law in the field of combating discrimination.
- July 11, 2008: Letter from the President of the Republic to the Prime Minister concerning national orders.
- July 23, 2008: Law on the modernization of the institutions of the Fifth Republic; it notably provides for specifying in the first article of the French Constitution: "The law promotes equal access for women and men to electoral mandates and elective functions, as well as to professional and social responsibilities."
- August 4, 2008: Law on the modernization of the economy.
- September 2008: Report on the image of women in the media, by Michèle Reiser.
- January 16, 2009: Law ratifying Ordinance No. 2005-759 of July 4, 2005, reforming filiation and modifying or repealing various provisions relating to parentage.
- May 6, 2009: Decree on voluntary termination of pregnancy by medical means.
- 2010: The fight against violence against women becomes a national cause.
- February 8, 2010: Law to include incest committed against minors in the Penal Code and to improve the detection and care of victims of incestuous acts.
- June 9, 2010: Law on the creation of childcare assistant centers and various provisions relating to childcare assistants.
- July 9, 2010: Law on violence specifically against women, domestic violence, and the impact of such violence on children.
- September 28, 2010: Law aimed at combating school absenteeism.
- October 11, 2010: Law banning the concealment of the face in public spaces.
- November 9, 2010: Pension reform law.
- January 27, 2011: Law on the balanced representation of women and men on boards of directors and supervisory boards, and on professional equality.
- May 24, 2011: Decree establishing a Commission on the image of women in the media.
- July 7, 2011: Law on bioethics.
- March 12, 2012: Law on access to permanent employment and improving working conditions for contract agents in the civil service, combating discrimination, and various civil service provisions.
- May 24, 2012: Decree on the responsibilities of the Minister for Women's Rights.
- August 6, 2012: Law on sexual harassment.
- September 28, 2012: Decree on the Interministerial Committee on Women's Rights and Gender Equality.
- November 30, 2012: The Interministerial Committee on Women's Rights establishes a 4-year action plan, prioritizing women's rights in public policies.
- December 17, 2012: Social Security Financing Law for 2013, including provisions on paternity leave.
- December 18, 2012: Decree on the implementation of corporate obligations regarding professional equality between women and men.
- January 3, 2013: Decree establishing an interministerial mission for the protection of women against violence and the fight against human trafficking.
- January 3, 2013: Decree establishing the High Council for Gender Equality.
- January 31, 2013: Law repealing Law No. 2010-1127 of September 28, 2010, aimed at combating school absenteeism.
- May 17, 2013: Law on the election of departmental, municipal, and community councillors and modifying the electoral calendar.
- May 17, 2013: Law opening marriage to same-sex couples.
- June 19, 2013: National interprofessional agreement "Toward a policy of improving quality of life at work and professional equality."
- July 8, 2013: Orientation and programming law for the refoundation of the Republic's school system.
- July 22, 2013: Law on higher education and research, notably requiring gender parity in elections and appointments to governance bodies of institutions.
- August 2, 2013: Law on the election of senators, introducing measures to increase female representation.
- August 5, 2013: Law on various adjustments in justice according to EU law and France's international commitments.
- November 2013: Fourth interministerial plan for preventing and combating violence against women.
- December 2013: Bill on combating the prostitution system.
- December 27, 2013: Decree on the annual report on professional equality in the civil service.
- January 20, 2014: Law ensuring the future and fairness of the pension system.
- April 16, 2014: Decree on the responsibilities of the Minister for Women's Rights, Cities, Youth, and Sports.
- July 4, 2014: France ratifies the Council of Europe Convention on preventing and combating violence against women and domestic violence (known as the "Istanbul Convention").
- August 4, 2014: Law for real equality between women and men (in public, professional, and private spheres).
- September 11, 2014: Decree on the responsibilities of the Minister for Social Affairs, Health, and Women's Rights.
- October 1, 2014: Decree on responsibilities delegated to the Secretary of State for Women's Rights.
- October 15, 2014: Health bill proposing that school nurses may provide emergency contraception and midwives may offer medical abortions.
- December 29, 2014: Public finance programming law for 2014–2019, with provisions concerning family allowances.
- January 16, 2015: National action program to improve access to abortion.
- March 2015: The High Council for Gender Equality publishes a scientific study on violence against women in public transportation and recommends a national action plan.
- August 17, 2015: Law on social dialogue and employment, including provisions against sexist behavior.
- October 15, 2015: Ordinance simplifying and modernizing family law.
- December 21 or 23, 2015: Decree on approving information centers on women's and family rights.
- December 21 or 23, 2015: Social Security Financing Law for 2016, including measures to guarantee unpaid child support.
- January 26, 2016: Health system modernization law; the minimum 7-day reflection period for abortion is abolished; midwives may offer medical abortions; health centers may perform surgical abortions.
- March 7, 2016: Law on the rights of foreigners in France; foreign women victims of violence more easily obtain residence permits.
- March 14, 2016: Law on child protection.
- April 13, 2016: Law strengthening the fight against the prostitution system and supporting sex workers; creation of an "exit from prostitution" program.
- August 8, 2016: Law on labor, modernizing social dialogue, and securing career paths; internal regulations must prohibit sexist behavior; legislative creation of the High Council for Professional Equality.
- October 7, 2016: Law for a digital republic; creation of the offense of sexual privacy violation (including "revenge porn").
- November 18, 2016: Law modernizing justice in the 21st century; divorce by mutual consent no longer requires a judge but must involve lawyers and a notary.
- December 2, 2016: Social Security Financing Law for 2017, establishing the Agency for the Recovery of Unpaid Child Support.
- January 27, 2017: Law on equality and citizenship, prioritizing women at risk of forced marriage for social housing.
- February 27, 2017: Law reforming criminal statute of limitations; extension of limitation periods for offenses such as: moral harassment; death, rape or sexual assault threats; domestic violence; sexual assaults other than rape; further extensions for crimes such as rape, mutilating or permanently disabling domestic violence, murder, abduction, and imprisonment.
- March 20, 2017: Law extending the offense of obstructing abortion to new online practices (e.g., hindering access to information or the procedure itself).
- May 24, 2017: Decree on responsibilities delegated to the Secretary of State for Gender Equality.
- October 2017: Global surge in public speaking out following the Weinstein affair: digital platforms such as Twitter host many testimonies of harassment and sexual assault under hashtags like #MeToo and #BalanceTonPorc in France.
- August 3, 2018: Law strengthening the fight against sexual and gender-based violence (creation of the offense of sexist insult, broader definition of online harassment, stronger penal provisions on sexual offenses against minors, and a 30-year statute of limitations from the victim's majority for sexual crimes against minors).
- September 5, 2018: Law on the freedom to choose one's professional future.
- September 10, 2018: Law on controlled immigration, effective asylum rights, and successful integration.
- March 23, 2019: Programming and reform law for justice (2018–2022).
- May 22, 2019: Law on business growth and transformation.
- May 27, 2019: Decree improving health and maternity coverage for self-employed workers.
- June 26, 2019: National action plan to eradicate female genital mutilation.
- July 24, 2019: Bioethics bill including access to medically assisted reproduction (ART) for female couples and single women.
- July 26, 2019: Law for a trustworthy school.
- August 6, 2019: Law transforming the civil service.
- December 28, 2019: Law against domestic violence.
- March 2020: During the COVID-19 pandemic and lockdowns, domestic violence increased significantly, highlighting the issue in society.
- June 24, 2020: Law combating online hate content.
- July 30, 2020: Law protecting victims of domestic violence.
- September 23, 2020: A mobile electronic anti-approach device is implemented by decree to remotely monitor violent spouses or ex-spouses.
- 2021: Year of the Generation Equality Forum of the United Nations (UN), co-organized and hosted by Mexico in the spring and by France at the end of June and beginning of July.
- December 24, 2021: Law no. 2021-1774 aimed at accelerating economic and professional equality, known as the "Rixain law."

=== Timeline of the struggle for professional equality in France ===
- 1900: Law allowing women full access to the bar, including the right to plead.
- 1907: A law authorizes married women to freely dispose of their salary. Previously, all earnings went to their husbands. They are also now allowed to sit on labor tribunals.
- 1908: Law grants eight weeks of maternity leave, unpaid.
- 1920: Women can join a union without their husband's authorization.
- 1924: Women are allowed to take the baccalauréat exam (some had already done so in the past, notably Julie-Victoire Daubié, but from now on, secondary education is the same for both sexes, allowing more girls to aim for this diploma).
- 1928: Two-month fully paid maternity leave is granted in the civil service.
- 1938: Women's legal incapacity is lifted. They can attend university, pursue studies, and obtain an identity card or passport without their husband's permission (Renoult law). However, the husband remains the head of the household and can forbid his wife from working.
- 1942: Widowed women are allowed to work, even if their husbands were employed, provided this does not cause layoffs.
- 1944: Women are granted the right to vote.
- 1945: The concept of "women's wages" is abolished. The principle "equal pay for equal work" is written into the legislation.
- 1946: Women can become judges.
- 1965: Reform of matrimonial regimes: women can work and open a bank account without their husband's authorization and benefit from social advantages.
- 1967: Medical contraception is legalized by the Neuwirth law. Women are allowed to enter the Paris stock exchange and speculate.
- 1970: The concept of "head of the household" is abolished. Equality between spouses in managing the household is established. Parental authority is created.
- 1971: Introduction of maternity leave compensated at 90%.
- 1972: A law introduces the principle of equal pay between men and women; the first in a series of laws on the subject that are rarely enforced. Women are admitted to École Polytechnique.
- 1975: Law banning all discrimination in the civil service. Simone Veil passed a law decriminalizing and regulating voluntary termination of pregnancy (abortion). A husband can no longer read his wife's correspondence or control her relationships. All higher education is accessible to women.
- 1977: Abolition of the single wage allowance.
- 1982: Wives of tradesmen and artisans can choose between three statuses: collaborating spouse, employee, or partner.
- 1983: Law on pay equality between men and women, very poorly enforced.
- 1984: Parental leave is made available to either parent.
- 1986: Ministerial circular promoting the feminization of job titles: artisane, écrivaine, etc.
- 1987: Loosening of restrictions on night work.
- 1992: Law against sexual harassment.
- 2001: Strengthening of the 1983 law on professional equality.
- 2005: New law on professional equality, with no binding criteria or penalties in case of non-compliance.
- 2006: Law on gender equality in education.
- 2006: Domestic violence prevention.
- 2010: Law concerning "violence against women," within couples, with consequences for children, creating the offense of psychological domestic violence.
- 2011: Council of Europe Convention on preventing and combating violence against women and domestic violence.
- 2013: The ban on women wearing trousers is officially repealed. Wearing trousers had become common from the 1960s onward.
- 2014: Law for real equality between women and men.
- 2017: Starting January 1, 2017, a 40% quota on boards of directors or supervisory boards must be respected (for companies with a minimum number of employees or board members).

== Violence against women ==
According to a study by the World Health Organization (WHO), between 15% and 71% of women have already been victims of domestic violence, whether physical, sexual, or psychological. In France, a partner kills his wife more than once every two days, more often by deliberate homicide than by violence resulting in death.

Measures implemented to combat violence against women include government intervention as well as that of the Ministry of Education. Numerous awareness campaigns have been established in schools. The Ministry of the Interior enacted a law on March 23, 2006, to promote gender equality in education. Several associations also intervene and advocate for gender diversity.

== See also ==
- Women's suffrage
- Feminism in France
- Françoise Héritier
- Working poor
- Employment discrimination
- Defender of Rights (France)

== Bibliography ==
- Touati, Sylvie (1976). Discrimination en France à l'égard des femmes dans l'emploi [Discrimination against women in employment in France] (in French). Mémoire DES.
- Boutillier, Sophie; Lestrade, Brigitte (2004). Le travail des femmes: axes d'émancipation [Women's work: paths to empowerment] (in French). Harmattan.
- Cova, A (1997). Maternité et droits des femmes en France, XIXe et XXe siècles [Motherhood and women's rights in France, 19th and 20th centuries] (in French). Paris: Anthropos.
- Milewski, Françoise; Périvier, Hélène (2011). Les discriminations entre les femmes et les hommes [Discrimination between women and men] (in French). Les Presses de Sciences Po.
- Fortino, Sabine (1999). "De la ségrégation sexuelle des postes à la mixité au travail : étude d'un processus" [From gender segregation in the workplace to gender diversity: a study of a process]. Sociologie du Travail (in French). 41 (4): 363–384.
- Maruani, Margaret (2011). Travail et emploi des femmes [Women's work and employment] (in French). La Découverte.
- Moreau, Marie-Pierre (2011). Les enseignants et le genre [Teachers and gender] (in French). Presses Universitaires de France.
