= Swayze =

Swayze (/ˈsweɪzi/ SWAY-zee) is a surname found chiefly in the English speaking regions of North America and representing an Anglicized form of the German-language surname Schweiz, Schweize, or Schweizer ("Swiss"). In the earliest case, Swayze (also spelled Swasey, Swayzee, Sweezey, Swazee, Swezey, Swazey, Swaiesy, Swayse, Sweazey, Sweazy, and Swasse) is a surname that arrived in America with John Swasey (ca. 1584 - 1686) and his sons Joseph Swasey and John Jr. around 1630 at Salem in the Massachusetts Bay Colony, with the spelling Swayze being used by John and his son John Swayze Jr. after persecution of Quakers led in the late 1650s to their move to Southold, Long Island, then a part of the Colony of New Haven. Many people surnamed Swayze in North America descend from the Southold branch of this family.

Notable persons having this surname include:

- Patrick Swayze, American actor and singer
- Don Swayze, American actor and stuntman, younger brother of Patrick Swayze
- Isaac Swayze, American-Canadian soldier and politician
- John Cameron Swayze, American news commentator
- Marc Swayze, American comic book writer

== Other uses ==
- Swayze Field, in Oxford, Mississippi, US
- Swayze Lake, in St. Landry Parish, Louisiana, US
- Swayze Bozeman (born 1998), American football player
- Shwayze, a rapper
- Swayzee (horse), an Australian harness racehorse

== See also ==
- Swayzee, Indiana (sometimes spelled "Swayze"), a town in the United States
