= Disappearance of Bobby Dunbar =

Unsolved disappearance of 4-year-old boy

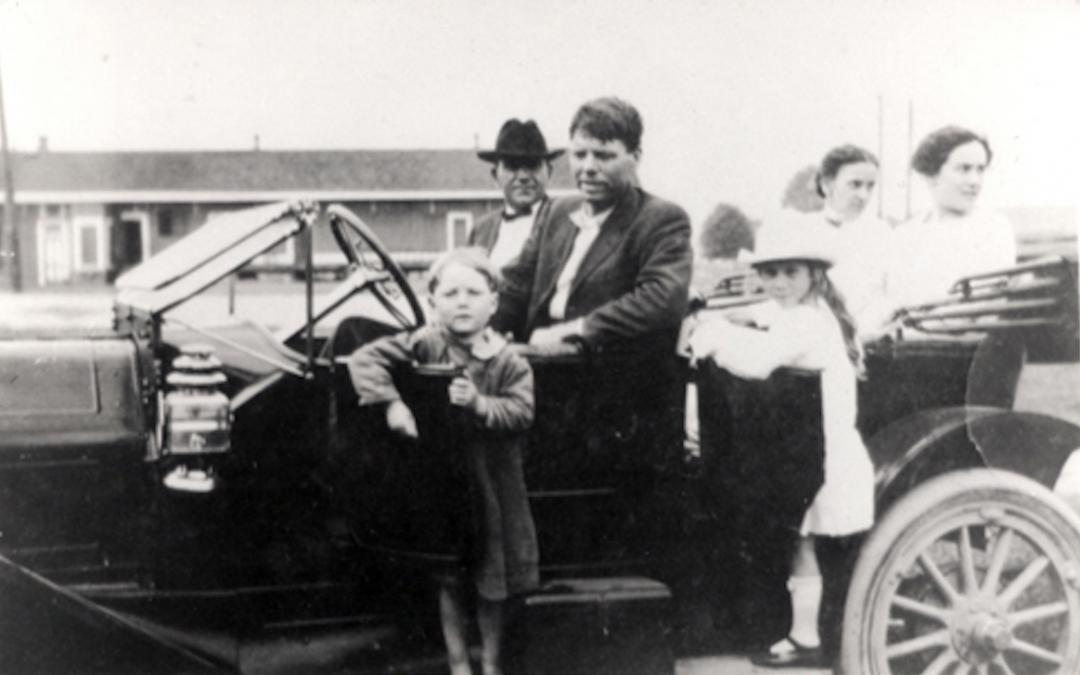
- The child raised as Dunbar (far left), now thought to be Anderson, standing in front of a car, c. 1913
- Date: August 23, 1912; 114 years ago
- Location: St. Landry Parish, Louisiana, U.S.
- Type: Disappearance
- Outcome: Cold case
- Missing: Robert "Bobby" Clarence Dunbar, aged 4
- Accused: William Cantwell Walters (exonerated)
- Charges: Kidnapping (dismissed)
- Verdict: Guilty (overturned)
- Sentence: Life imprisonment (overturned; released after 2 years)

Bobby Dunbar was an American boy whose disappearance at the age of four and apparent return were widely reported in newspapers across the United States in 1912 and 1913. After eight months of nationwide searching, investigators believed they had found the child in Mississippi, in the hands of William Cantwell Walters of Barnesville, North Carolina. Dunbar's parents claimed the boy as their missing son. However, Walters claimed he was willingly given custody of the child, named Bruce Anderson, by Julia Anderson, the boy's mother. Anderson confirmed Walters' account, but could not afford a lawyer and the court eventually ruled in favor of the Dunbars. The Dunbars retained custody of the child, who proceeded to live out the remainder of his life as Bobby. Walters served two years of a life sentence for a kidnapping conviction, which was later overturned.

In 2004, DNA profiling established the other Dunbar siblings were not related to the returned Bobby. This discovery led the involved families to conclude that the recovered child had in fact been Bruce Anderson, and the real Bobby Dunbar had thus never been found.

== Disappearance ==
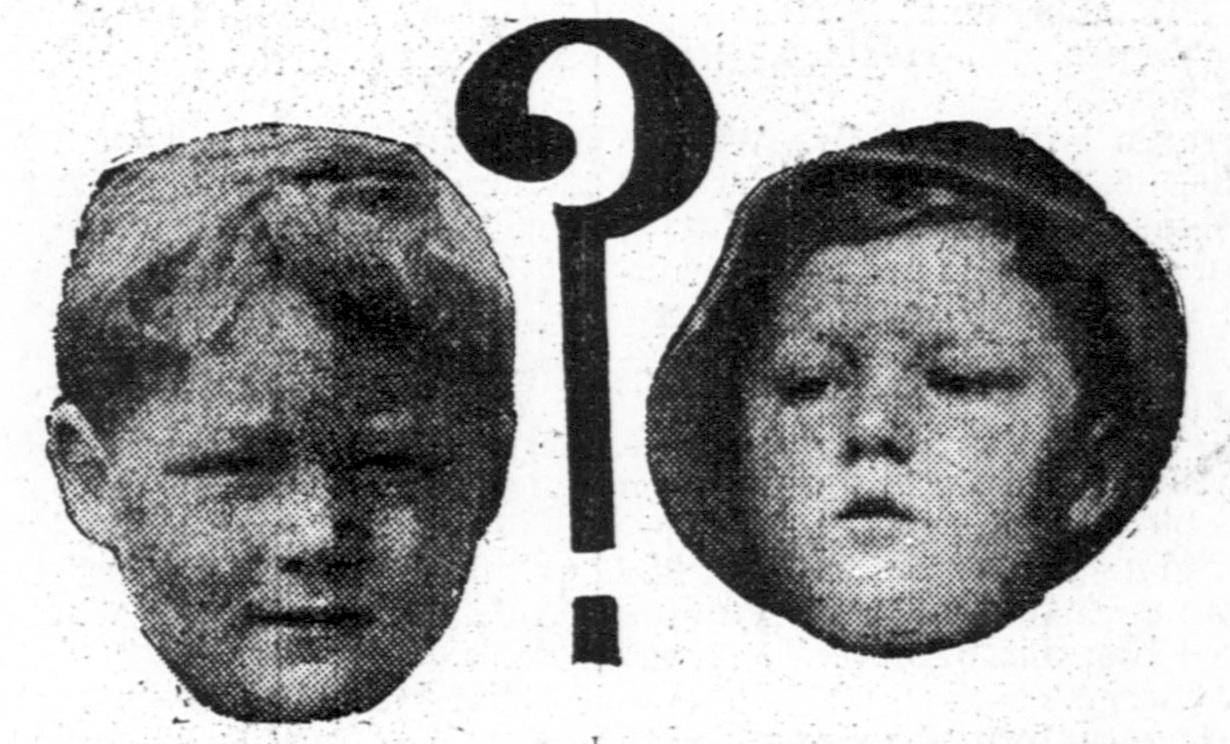
Newspaper photos of a confirmed Dunbar before he was lost (left) and the boy who was found later (right), c. 1914

Robert Clarence "Bobby" Dunbar was the first son born to Lessie and Percy Dunbar of Opelousas, Louisiana. He was born on May 23, 1908. In August 1912, the Dunbars took a fishing trip to nearby Swayze Lake in St. Landry Parish, Louisiana. On August 23, while on that trip, Bobby disappeared. A $1,000 reward was then announced for his return.

After an eight-month search and the reward being raised to $6,000, authorities located William Cantwell Walters, who worked as an itinerant handyman, specializing in the tuning and repairing of pianos and organs. Walters had been traveling through Mississippi with a boy who appeared to match the description of Bobby Dunbar. Walters claimed that the boy was actually Charles Bruce Anderson, generally referred to as Bruce, the son of a woman who worked for his family. He said that the boy's mother was named Julia Anderson, and that she had willingly granted him custody. Anderson would later confirm this. Nonetheless, Walters was arrested and authorities sent for the Dunbars to come to Mississippi and attempt to identify the boy.

Newspaper accounts differ with regard to the initial reaction between the boy and Lessie Dunbar. One account indicated the boy immediately shouted "Mother" upon seeing her, followed by an embrace between the two. Another source said only that the boy cried, and quoted Lessie Dunbar as saying she was unsure whether he was her son. Other newspaper accounts quote both the Dunbars as initially stating doubts as to the boy's identity. There were similar contradictions in newspaper accounts of the boy's first sighting of the Dunbars' younger son, Alonzo, with one newspaper claiming that the boy recognized Alonzo instantly, called him by name and kissed him, with another saying the boy showed no sign of recognizing Alonzo. The next day, after bathing the boy, Lessie Dunbar said she positively identified his moles and scars and was then certain that he was her son. The boy returned to Opelousas with the Dunbars to a parade, with much fanfare celebrating the "homecoming."

Shortly thereafter, Julia Anderson of North Carolina arrived to support Walters' contention that the boy was, in fact, her son, Bruce. Anderson was unmarried and worked as a field hand for Walters' family. She said that she had allowed Walters to take her son only for what was supposed to be a two-day trip to visit one of Walters' relatives. She further asserted that she had not consented for Walters to take her son for more than a few days.

According to newspaper accounts, Anderson was presented with five different boys who were of the same approximate age as her son, including the boy who had been claimed by the Dunbars. When the boy in question was presented, he reportedly gave no indication that he recognized her. She asked whether he was the boy recovered, but was not given an answer and finally declared that she was unsure.

Upon seeing the boy again the next day, when she was allowed to undress him, she indicated a stronger certainty that the boy was indeed her son Bruce. However, word had already spread about her failure to positively identify him on the first attempt. This development, combined with the fact that newspapers questioned her moral character in having had three children out of wedlock (the other two deceased by that point), contributed to Anderson's claims being dismissed.

With no money to sustain a long court battle, Anderson returned home to North Carolina. She later returned to Louisiana for Walters' kidnapping trial to attest to his innocence and push for the court to determine that the boy was her son. At the trial, she became acquainted with the residents of the town of Poplarville, Mississippi, many of whom had also come to proclaim Walters' innocence. William Walters and the boy had spent quite a bit of time in Poplarville during their travels and the community there had come to know them well, with a number of them asserting that they had seen Walters with the boy prior to the disappearance of Bobby Dunbar. Despite their testimony, the court reached the determination that the boy was in fact Bobby Dunbar. Walters was extradited from Mississippi to Louisiana for trial. Walters was convicted of kidnapping and sentenced to life in prison. The boy remained in the custody of the Dunbar family and lived out the remainder of his life as Bobby Dunbar. Walters served two years in prison before his conviction was overturned on appeal; the state decided not to re-try him, and he was released.

== After the trial ==
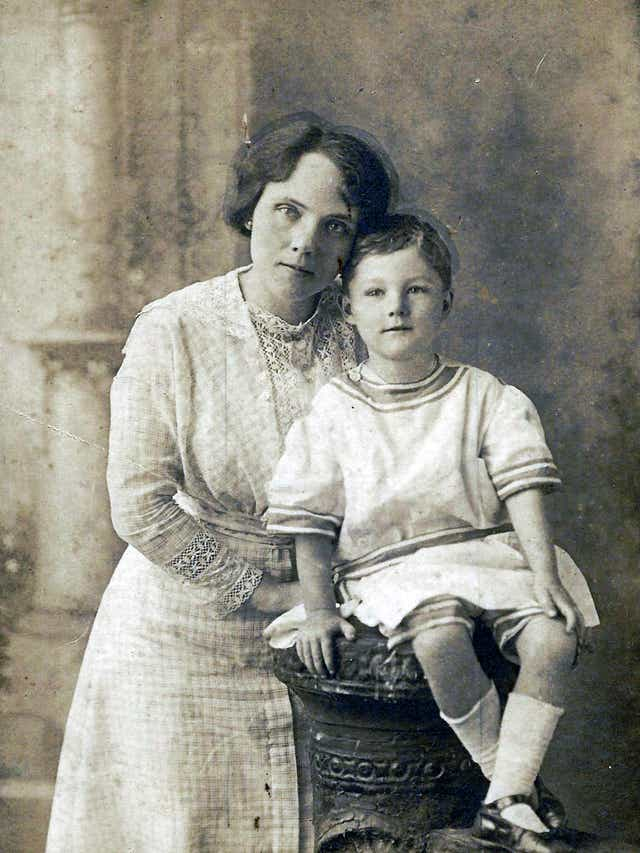
Lessie Dunbar with the child who grew up as Bobby Dunbar, c. 1914

After the trial, the people of Poplarville welcomed Anderson and she began a new life there, eventually marrying and having seven children. According to her descendants, she became a devout Christian, helped found a church and served as nurse and midwife to the small community. Although her children indicated that her life was a happy one after settling in Poplarville, they said that she nonetheless spoke often of her lost son and that their family always regarded him as having been kidnapped by the Dunbars. She died on February 1, 1940, and is buried in Fords Creek Cemetery in Poplarville.

In 2008, one of Anderson's sons, Hollis, recounted the story for This American Life that in 1944 Bobby Dunbar/Bruce Anderson visited him at his place of business, where they talked. Hollis' sister Jules has recounted a similar experience where a man, who she believes to have been Dunbar/Anderson, came to the service station where she worked and talked to her for an extended period. The Dunbar family also has a similar story, as told by Bobby Dunbar's son Gerald. The family was returning home from a trip in 1963 and passed through Poplarville when Dunbar said, "Those are the people they came to pick me up from."

After Walters had served two years of his prison term for kidnapping, his attorney was successful in appealing the conviction and it was overturned by the Louisiana Supreme Court. Walters was then granted the right to a new trial. Citing the excessive costs of the first trial, prosecutors in Opelousas declined to try him again and instead released him. After his release from custody, Walters resumed an itinerant lifestyle. Walters died on April 7, 1945, and was buried in Pueblo, Colorado, beside his wife. The grandchildren of Walters' brother reported that during their childhood, he typically visited their grandfather a few times per year and that during these visits, Walters always maintained his innocence regarding the kidnapping charge.

The boy raised as Bobby Dunbar married, had four children of his own, and ran a gas station. At one point in 1954, Bobby Dunbar Jr. asked his father if he was sure he really was Bobby Dunbar or not. His father responded “I know who I am, and I know who you are. And nothing else makes a difference.” Bobby Dunbar died on March 8, 1966, and was buried in Bellevue Memorial Park in Opelousas, Louisiana. His widow died in 1994 and was interred next to her husband.

== Later investigation ==
In 1999, 33 years after the returned Bobby Dunbar's death, one of his granddaughters, Margaret Dunbar Cutright, began her own investigation of the events. She pored through newspaper accounts, interviewed the children of Julia Anderson and examined the notes and evidence presented by Walters' defense attorney for his kidnapping trial and appeal. Although Cutright had initially hoped to prove that her grandfather was a Dunbar, her research led to significant doubts. In 2004, after an Associated Press reporter approached the family about the story, Bobby Dunbar Jr. consented to undergoing DNA tests. The results showed that Dunbar Jr. was not related by blood to his supposed cousin, the son of Alonzo Dunbar.

In March 2008, Public Radio International's This American Life featured The Ghost of Bobby Dunbar, a radio documentary about the investigation of the case by Margaret Dunbar Cutright. She expressed her own opinion that the real Bobby Dunbar most likely fell into Swayze Lake during the fishing trip and was eaten by an alligator. She revealed the results of her investigation had brought joy to Julia Anderson's family as vindication of her claims, as well as to William Walters' family as an exoneration of the kidnapping accusation against him. She also said that her findings had sown discord within her own family, as the majority of her grandfather's children and grandchildren considered themselves to be members of the Dunbar family, cherished their existing familial relationships, and were resentful of Cutright, both for having delved into the matter and for bringing it back into the public eye.

In 2012, Tal McThenia and Cutright published a book detailing the Dunbar case, entitled A Case for Solomon.

== See also ==
- List of people who disappeared
- Walter Collins
- Disappearance of Marjorie West
- Paul Fronczak triple disappearance
- Disappearance of Pauline Picard
