= Disappearance of Marjorie West =

American child who disappeared in 1938

Marjorie West
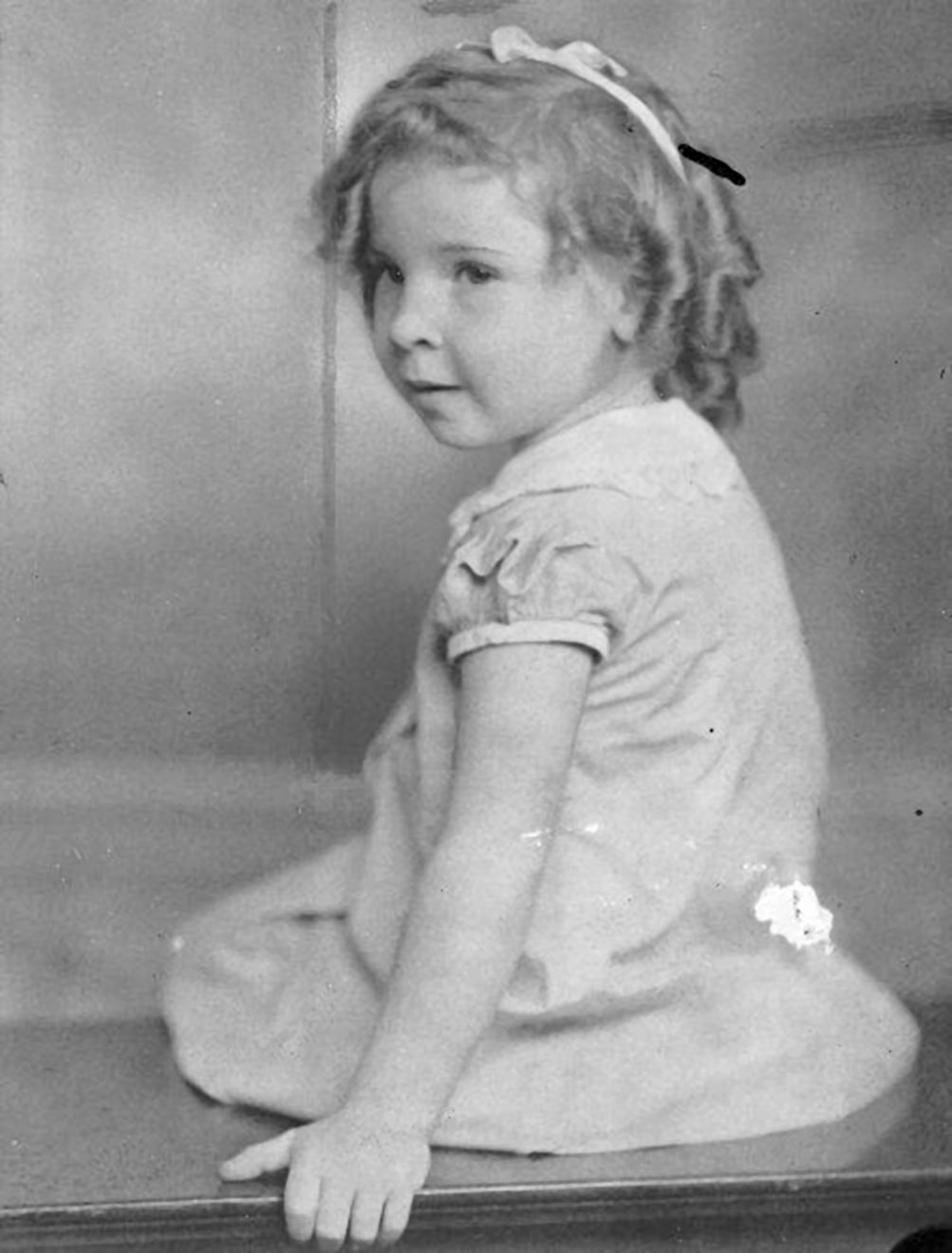
- Portrait of 4-year-old Marjorie West
- Born: June 2, 1933; Bradford, Pennsylvania, U.S.
- Disappeared: May 8, 1938 (aged 4); McKean County, Pennsylvania, U.S.
- Status: Missing for 87 years, 10 months and 26 days
- Parents: Shirley (father); Cecilia (mother)
- Relatives: Dorothea (sister); Allan (brother)

Marjorie West was a four-year-old American child who went missing from McKean County, Pennsylvania on May 8, 1938. Her disappearance was heavily covered by both local and national media, but her whereabouts have never been ascertained. In 2018, The Guardian, a British daily newspaper, and the National Center for Missing and Exploited Children, a nonprofit organization established by the United States Congress, referred to Marjorie West's disappearance as "the great unsolved mystery of the missing". A local publisher claims to have solved the mystery, but their solution has never been independently confirmed.

Marjorie West was born in Bradford, Pennsylvania to Shirley and Celia West, who had three children: Marjorie, her sister Dorothea and brother Allan. She was the youngest child.

== Disappearance ==
On May 8, 1938, Marjorie, along with her parents, 7-year-old brother Allan and 11-year-old sister Dorothea, attended a church in Bradford, Pennsylvania. After they attended the church, they went to Marshburg, Pennsylvania for a picnic to celebrate Mother's Day. Dorothea left Marjorie alone while she spoke to her mother. When Dorothea went back to Marjorie, she had disappeared and was never seen again. Her parents called the police, but the police found no evidence of Marjorie's whereabouts.

Five days after her disappearance, the state police commissioner of that time, P. W. Foote, told the newspapers that Marjorie's disappearance probably began with a hide-and-seek game, which was one of her favorites.

== Investigation ==
Police used dogs to pick up her scent trail, but nothing was found. The searches were conducted by 3,000 local people and 500 policemen, including the Civilian Conservation Corps and the American fraternal order Elks Lodge to trace the missing child. "All available flash-lights in the city were pressed into service", noted the Bradford Era newspaper. The day after the disappearance, police began a massive search and interviewed motorists within a 300-square-mile area. The Bradford Citizen Reward Committee later offered a reward of $2,500 (equivalent to $57,000 in 2025) for her safe return and information. On May 10, police found clues they thought were related to the case and brought a bloodhound in from New York, but the accounts vary. Despite conducting massive searches for five months, police did not find her.

== Later developments ==
On the 70th anniversary of her disappearance, the fifth grade students at the School Street Elementary School developed different theories through offline and Internet research on "who might have taken Marjory [sic]".

== The book Finding Marjorie West ==
In 2010, a local McKean County publisher released Finding Marjorie West. The book details how the author, Harold Thomas Beck, then editor-in-chief of the Mountain Laurel Review, resurrected the disappearance. He had published two articles on the anniversary of the disappearance in 1995 and 1996. In 1997, he was contacted by the missing girl's older sister, Dorothea, who provided additional information, corrected errors in newspaper accounts, and sent along family photographs, including one of herself at age 65. Beck launched a personal website to share his information and begin a search to determine if the now-adult West could still be alive. He did extensive research on age progression to determine what West might look like as an adult, using photographs of Dorothea as a child and at her current age to study family resemblance between her and Marjorie. Dorothea's childhood photos strongly resembled those of Marjorie at the same age, and Beck extrapolated that the same would hold true in adulthood. In early 2000, Beck says he was contacted by a woman who claimed a coworker was identical to the projected image of Marjorie at what would have been her current age. Beck met this person, Sylvia Waldrop London, at her home in North Carolina and told her of his suspicions that she was the missing Marjorie West. After she denied the claim, Beck began a correspondence with her. He agreed to not share the woman's identity with anyone until after her death. She eventually admitted that her mother confessed on her deathbed to her husband having stolen her from a park, and that she had remembered the names Dorothea and Allan from childhood. The book says that Ms. London died of cancer on February 27, 2009, according to her daughter Mary Thigpen. The Mountain Laurel Review serialized portions of Beck's book between July 2018 and June 2021.

== See also ==
- Disappearance of Bobby Dunbar
- List of kidnappings
- Sodder children disappearance
