= Swasey =

Swasey (also spelled Swayze, Swayzee, Sweezey, Swazee, Swezey, Swazey, Swaiesy, Swayse, Sweazey, Sweazy, and Swasse) is an English surname that arrived in America with John Swasey (ca. 1584 - 1686) around 1630 at the Massachusetts Bay Colony. The name is found on both sides of the Atlantic, such as between 1576 and 1744 in Bridport in Dorset, where someone of the name founded a charity. In other cases, Swasey surname origin represents an Anglicized form of the German-language surname Schweiz, Schweize, or Schweizer ("Swiss").

Though it has been reported that those of this surname live or have lived in Portsmouth, London and Beverly Hills, an enumeration of descendants of John Swasey would be fairly large, including some descendants of the Salem planter Thomas Gardner.

People with this surname or variants include:

- Ambrose Swasey (1846–1937), American engineer
- Garrett Swasey (1971–2015), American ice skater and policeman
- John Cameron Swayze (1906–1995), American TV personality
- Otto Herman Swezey (1869–1959), American entomologist
- Patrick Swayze (1952–2009), American movie star
- Kenneth M. Swezey, (1904–1972) American science writer
