= A Case for Solomon =

2012 non-fiction book by Tal McTenia and Margaret Dunbar Cutright

- First edition
- Author: Tal McThenia; Margaret Dunbar Cutright
- Language: English
- Genre: Non-fiction
- Publisher: Simon & Schuster
- Publication date: 2012
- Publication place: United States
- ISBN: 9781439158593

A Case for Solomon is a 2012 non-fiction book chronicling the 1912 disappearance of Bobby Dunbar, aged four, in Opelousas, Louisiana, and his apparent return. The book was authored by Tal McThenia and Margaret Dunbar Cutright, the granddaughter of Bobby Dunbar. McThenia and Cutright had previously documented Bobby Dunbar's disappearance in a 2008 episode of This American Life.

== Reception ==
The book received generally positive reviews. Elissa Schappell wrote of the book in Vanity Fair, "Rarely do nonfiction books engage me so deeply and satisfyingly as Tal McThenia’s A Case for Solomon". The book received a more mixed review in Kirkus Reviews, which wrote that the book was "diminished by the inability of the authors to screen out irrelevant or marginal details, making the saga difficult to follow". The book was also reviewed in Publishers Weekly, Library Journal, Maclean's, The Boston Globe and The Atlanta Journal-Constitution.
