= Disappearance of Pauline Picard =

1922 case of a missing French toddler

The disappearance of Pauline Picard was the case of a missing Breton toddler in 1922.

Pauline Picard was discovered missing on 6 April 1922 from her family's farm in Saint-Rivoal, Brittany, in France. An extensive search turned up few suspects and no evidence. When a similar girl was found in distant Cherbourg, Normandy, a month later, the Picards claimed her as their own and took her back to Brittany, despite discrepancies and reservations.

Almost three weeks later, the naked and mutilated corpse of a young girl was found near the farm, along with Pauline Picard's clothes. A formal investigation determined that the body was that of Picard, and that she had died accidentally, possibly of exposure. Picard was buried, though the press continued to question her identity. The Cherbourgeoise girl was returned to that city, where she died of measles in the first days of 1924.

== Background ==
Pauline Picard
- Born: 1919/1920
- Disappeared: 6 April 1922 (aged 2); Saint-Rivoal, Brittany, French Third Republic
- Status: Presumed body found
- Body discovered: 25 or 26 May 1922
- Resting place: Saint-Rivoal, France

Pauline Picard was born circa 1919/1920, and at age two and a half, she lived on her family's farm in the French village Goas-al-Ludu, Saint-Rivoal, in the Monts d'Arrée mountain range. The Picard family consisted of Pauline, her father François Picard, her mother Marianne, and her eight siblings. Of the eleven, only François Picard spoke French; the rest of the family spoke Breton.

== Search ==
Picard went missing on 6 April 1922 while playing outdoors.

Family, locals, and police searched for Picard to no avail. Three weeks after her disappearance, it was generally assumed she had been killed by a wild boar or kidnapped by gypsies, though none of the latter had been seen around the time of Picard's disappearance.

=== Suspects ===
Christophe Kéramon (born c. 1860s) was an occasional agricultural worker for the Picards, itinerant umbrella peddler, and had previously been imprisoned five years for rape. He had visited the farm on 6 April, and paid particular attention to Pauline Picard before leaving around 1 p.m. Arrested for not carrying his internal passport (carnet anthropométrique), Kéramon served a month in prison before his release on 10 May. Police arrested him on suspicion, but testimony from François Picard placed Keramon six kilometres (3.7 mi) away when Pauline Picard was last seen, and so the traveling salesman was released.

Two other suspects were foreigners seen by a local woman to be loitering and watching the girl.

== Foundling ==
=== In Cherbourg ===
Saint-Rivoal and Cherbourg

On 6 May 1922, police notified Picard's family that she had possibly been found in Cherbourg, 250 miles (400 km) away. In 1922, Le Matin reported that the girl had been abandoned on Coypel Street; in 1924, L'Ouest-Éclair said she was abandoned at a woman's house on Crespel Street; and in 2017, Ozy described her as being found in the company of "a mysterious woman dressed in rags". The girl was taken to a hospital, never speaking a word.

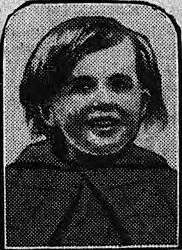
1922 photograph of the Cherbourgeoise girl

Le Matin reported that when the girl's photo was shown to Picard's mother, she exclaimed, "'It is really my daughter,' cried she, 'my poor little Pauline! But how is she so far from us?'" (French: «C'est bien ma fille, s'écria-t-elle, ma pauvre petite Pauline! Mais comment se trouve-t-elle si loin de nous ?») On 7 May, the Picards left for Cherbourg on their first-ever journey by train.

After arriving on 8 May, the Picards immediately traveled to the hospital to see the girl. The parents were sure that the girl was their daughter, albeit thinner than she had been, but didn't understand her mutism, why she didn't recognize them, nor why she did not understand the Breton language. After two hours with the girl, the Picards began to doubt she was their daughter. The public prosecutor urged the family to stay at the hospice for another day, with Le Petit Parisien reporting that the Cherbourgeoise girl was likely not Pauline Picard. On 9 May, by which time the father assured the press it was his daughter, the public prosecutor gave the unspeaking girl to the Picard family, who left Cherbourg the next morning.

Items found with the girl were unidentifiable by the Picards. Other discrepancies between Pauline Picard and the foundling came to be explained as amnesia due to post-traumatic stress disorder, assuming the toddler had been abused by her kidnapper; doctors believed that returning her home would help her recover. There was no explanation for how Picard traveled to Cherbourg.

=== In Goas-al-Ludu ===
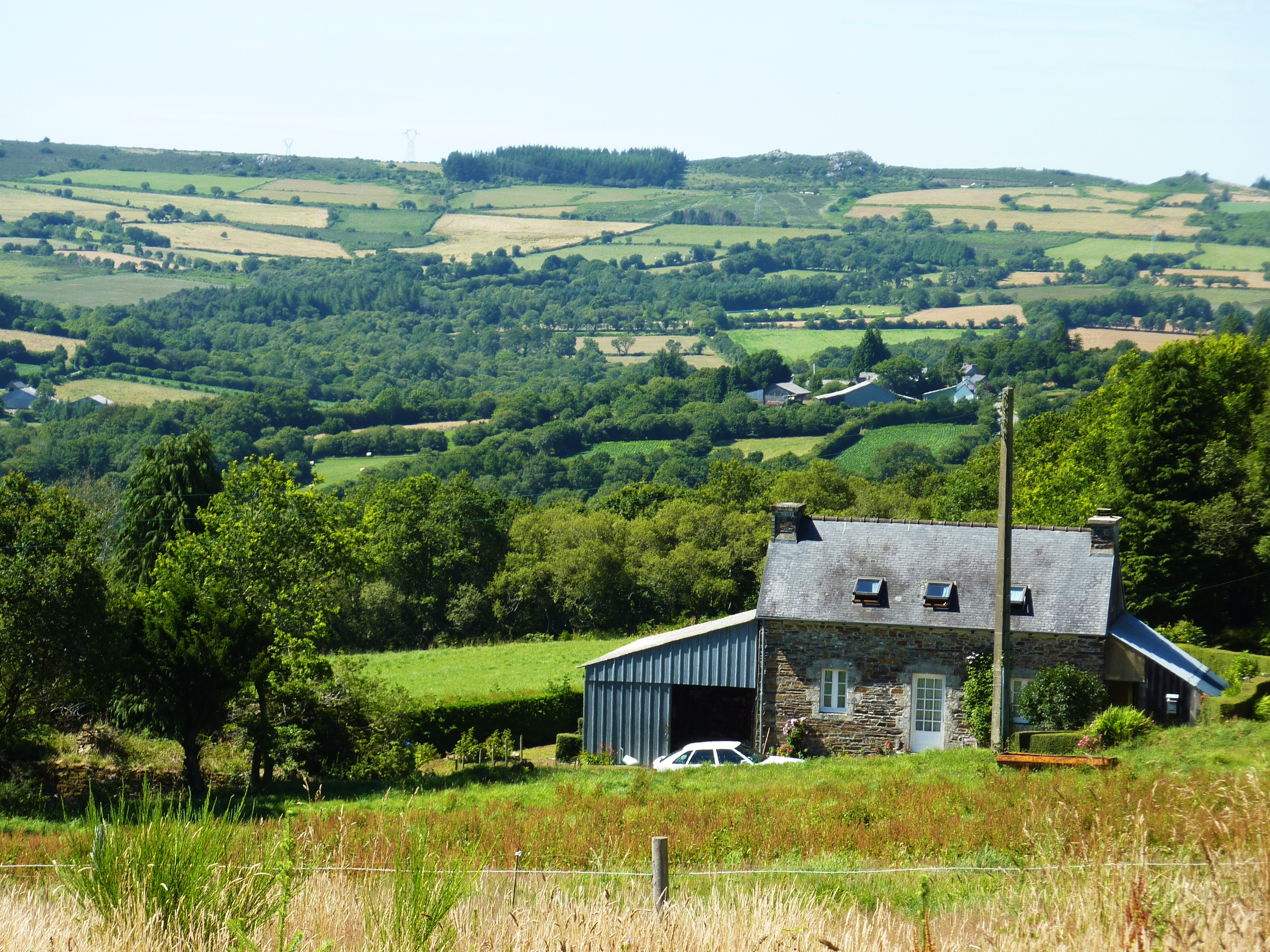
The single-dwelling village of Goas-al-Ludu in July 2010

After arriving in Goas-al-Ludu on 12 May, the girl believed to be Pauline Picard remained temporarily mute. Picard's parents, brothers, sisters, and neighbors all recognized the rescued girl, and she cried in fright when taken to the abduction area. The Cherbourg nurses, who had accompanied the family back to Brittany, were convinced that the girl was home.

A local farmer, the 49-year-old Yves Martin, visited the Picard home on 13 May and questioned whether the lost girl was truly home. (French: «Alors», dit-il en breton, «la petite est de retour?» [...] «C'est bien elle?», lit. '"So," he said in Breton, "is the little girl back?" [...] "It's her?"') Martin then made an exclamation (variously reported as "God forgive me. I am guilty.", "God help me, I'm guilty!", and French: «Dieu est juste, c'est moi le coupable !», lit. '"God is right, I'm the culprit!"') before running off "in wild laughter" and being admitted to a psychiatric hospital in Quimper on 14 May.

== Corpse ==
Contemporary reports differ on the specifics, but agree that in late May 1922, the decomposing, mutilated body of a small girl was found near the Picards' farm. Le Matin reported from Brest that, on 25 May, a cyclist found the body 1,000 or 500 metres (3,300 or 1,600 ft) from Goas-al-Ludu; Le Petit Parisien—also in Brest—said that it was 26 May when a cyclist found the body 800–900 metres (2,600–3,000 ft) from the family's farm; and The New York Times reported from Paris that it was 25 May when a farmer found the corpse one mile (1.6 km) from the village.

Both Le Matin and the Times elaborated that when the Goas-al-Ludu gendarmes were brought to the body, villagers—including the Picards—followed. The body was found in a ditch that had been thoroughly searched after Picard's initial disappearance, and government officials from Brasparts and Rennes formally confirmed this; Ozy author Addison Nugent suggested that this means somebody wanted the body found.

The girl's body was completely naked, decapitated, and missing its hands and feet. The body was accompanied by the skull of a fully-grown man, suggesting a second victim; the man's head "could not be identified, the face having been partly devoured by foxes." Nearby, a pair of galoshes, socks, and fustian dress were neatly folded and arranged; these bloodstained clothes were identified by the Picard family as being their daughter's, worn the day she disappeared.

By 27 May 1922, Le Petit Parisien was certain that the body found was that of Pauline Picard, as was François Picard when the body was first discovered. Yet later, when questioned (French: «N'est-ce pas votre enfant?», lit. '"Is not this your child?"') by a Rennais commissioner, he vacillated regarding which child was his daughter: "It's her clothes. [...] But, is it her body? [...] Oh! the other is so similar!" (French: «C'est bien ses vêtements. [...] Mais, est-ce son corps? [...] Oh ! l'autre est si ressemblante !») On 27 May 1922, a judge from Châteaulin was expected to arrive and take charge of the investigation, with "the [m]agistrates investigating the case hav[ing] been seriously embarrassed."

A Dr. Pouliquen examined the body, and, finding evidence of wounds, sent it to Châteaulin for closer examination. Dr. Gouriou later studied the body and found a stab-wound in the groin measuring one centimetre (0.39 in) in length, and two centimetres (0.79 in) in depth. Though his preliminary cause of death was violent murder, investigators were leaning towards accidental death due to exposure. An autopsy provided no conclusive evidence for either determination.

== Outcome ==
=== Pauline Picard ===
The Châteaulinois judge determined the body to be Pauline Picard and her cause of death accidental. She was buried in Saint-Rivoal, in a white, wooden coffin. By June 1922, however, rumors were circulating Brittany that Picard was still alive, having been kidnapped by a wealthy family who left the body of their own ill-fated progeny in her place. Le Petit Parisien predicted that these rumors would prompt a re-opening of the investigation. As of October 2017, no genetic testing had been performed on the body, and as such, it had not been conclusively identified as Picard's.

=== Cherbourgeoise girl ===
The foundling was sent back to a Cherbourg hospice on 13 June 1922 at the request of prosecutors there. Almost two months later, she was speaking complete sentences in the Breton language, prompting Le Petit Parisien to declare her a Breton, and to again suggest she was the real Pauline Picard.

News coverage of the Cherbourgeoise girl, whom they referred to as "the girl with the pretty smile" (French: «la fillette au joli sourire»), led interested families to request to adopt her. She was named Marie-Louise Pauline by the civil court of Cherbourg, and placed in the care of the Franciscan Sisters of Notre-Dame-du-Vœu. Her death there was reported on 2 January 1924, a victim of a measles epidemic.

== See also ==
- List of solved missing person cases (pre-1950)
