= Sourya =

French pop band

- Origin: Paris, France
- Genres: Electronica, electro, pop
- Years active: 2005–present
- Labels: Crystal Oscillator Soul
- Members: Sourya Voravong; Julien Coulon; Rudy Phounpadith; Arnaud Colinart

Sourya is a French pop band formed in 2005. Sourya "Daddy Sou" (vocals/guitar) initiated the project. After playing in a Parisian band from 1997 to 2005, he began recording demos. In 2005, he met his friends Julien (guitar/programming) and Rudy (bass) at a Paris club called The Shebeen. When going into live performances, he asked them to come. The relative success of their first releases encouraged them to take a drummer, Arnaud, so that the band would appear as a quartet in press shots.

Sourya was described by NME as "purveyors of resplendent and soulful electronica." They released Love Song, in 2006. The track "Numero 1" received radio airplay. The band toured in France and the U.K., and they have been championed by Alan McGee (Creation Records) as the "most successful band to come out of France in the last 20 years." Their debut album, Dawdlewalk was released in France in October 2009. In June 2010, Sourya released Star Gigolos and headlined the Villa Aperta festival in Rome, Italy.

== Discography ==
* 2006 - Love Song E.P. (COMING SOON)

1. Love Songpoi-kuyt-opi
2. Sleeping Beauty
3. For Girls (Boy Warning)
4. Numero 1
- 2008 - Cheese / Unsuspected 45T (QUICK ONE RECORDS)
1. Cheese
2. Unsuspected
- 2009 - Anatomy Domine Remixes E.P. (CTRL ALT DEL RECORDS)
1. Anotomy Domine (Original Version)
2. Anotomy Domine (Talk Machine Remix)
3. Anotomy Domine (Prince Language Vocal Mix)
4. Anotomy Domine (Prince Language Instrumental Mix)
- 2009 - Dawdlewalk (MASSIVE CENTRAL)
1. Drinking in Your Town
2. Stockholm 1973
3. Unsuspected
4. Numero 1
5. The Ballad of Star Gigolo
6. Anatomy Domine
7. Numero 2
8. Sleep Stage Zero
9. Numero 3
10. Cheater, Liar!Liar!Liar!
11. Au Revoir, Pluton
12. Cheese (Bonus Track)
- 2010 - Star Gigolos E.P.
1. Akzidens (Radio Edit)
2. Akzidens
3. Chimney
4. The Dance of Star Gigolo
