= Swayze Lake =

Lake in St. Landry, Parish, Louisiana, United States

- Location: St. Landry Parish, Louisiana
- Coordinates: 30.6388023°N 91.8253933°W

Swayze Lake is situated in St. Landry Parish, Louisiana, United States. The lake is best known for the disappearance of Bobby Dunbar; the boy was last seen there attending a family fishing trip on August 23, 1912.
