= Murder of Marine Boisseranc =

Unexplained murder in France

Marine Boisseranc
- Born: Marine Boisseranc; 29 March 1985; Lyon
- Died: 11 October 2005 (aged 20); Chazay-d'Azergues
- Cause of death: Stabbed

Marine Boisseranc (29 March 1985 – 11 October 2005) was a 20-year-old French student who was found dead at her home in 2005. Despite the family's appeals to the courts, the police investigation has not produced any consistent leads since and the case remains unsolved.

== Background ==
Marine Boisseranc was a BTS accounting student in Villefranche-sur-Saône and lives in Chazay-d'Azergues in the Rhône. She lived at the family home, with her parents and her two brothers. Her mother is an acupuncturist and her father is a medical representative at Sanofi. In 2005, she was in a relationship, but was reportedly considering breaking up with her boyfriend.

== Facts ==
Having returned home early from school that day, Marine Boisseranc was found in a pool of blood. She had sustained twelve stab wounds in the chest and back. It was her father who discovered her unconscious behind the sofa, just a few minutes after the murder when he had returned to the family home. He immediately called one of his doctor friends whose practice was located 300 metres from the home. Once there, the doctor informed him of the victim's death.

== Inquiry ==
Only a few clues were found:

- A footprint from a Nike shoe
- Around the time of the crime, the victim's mobile phone reached a mechanic from an automobile repair shop, who only heard a man's voice ordering him to hang up, according to the detailed invoices provided by his operator
- The victim's phone was never found, although many people tried in vain to trace it around the family home
- No evidence of a break-in or burglary was found

In 2021, after more than fifteen years without results, the police issued a call for witnesses.

== Suspects ==
- Prowler

For a time, the investigation focused on a homeless prowler, but without conclusive follow-up.

- Stéphane Moitoiret

The justice system evaluated the possibility that Stéphane Moitoiret, the murderer of little Valentin Crémault, is responsible for the crime.

In December 2020, a testimony is published in the regional daily Le Progrès: a witness indicates having crossed paths with the couple Stéphane Moitoiret / Noëlla Hego, on 11 October 2005, 400 metres as the crow flies from the Boisseranc house. A few days later, a second witness came forward and confirmed having met the Moitoiret couple in Morancé, a village near Chazay-d'Azergues, on the morning of the murder. These two testimonies prompted investigators to look into the potential involvement of the Moitoiret couple in the commission of this crime. In March 2021, a call for witnesses was issued by the central management of the judicial police in order to find other witnesses who could have seen the couple at that time.

- Ex-boyfriend

Ludovic Pierrefeu, a former boyfriend, was long suspected, but due to insufficient evidence, he was placed under assisted witness status in 2014.

== Investigation ==
In twenty years, the case has grown to more than thirty-two volumes with the involvement of several magistrates. Several procedural missteps have taken place or been narrowly avoided. The father of the victim, Eric Boisseranc is an advocate for justice for his daughter.
