= Fillon law, 2005 =

French education reform law

The Fillon law of 2005 is a law to reform France's education system. It was adopted in France in April 2005, and is named after François Fillon, who at the time was the Minister of Education. Its formal name in French is Loi d'orientation et de programme pour l'avenir de l'école.

== Aims of the law ==
- Introduction of a core knowledge for certain subjects. This includes French, mathematics, a foreign language, humanistic and scientific culture, communication and information. This excludes arts subjects from its core knowledge.
- Three hours of support for teachers
- Abolition of travaux personnels encadrés, guided personal projects combining various subjects, research and free study

== Reactions ==
The reaction to the 2005 Fillon law has been mostly negative, but 20 years on, it is still in effect.

The new law was met with significant backlash from students. On 5 February 2005, hundreds of thousands of students demonstrated against the law by refusing to go to school or by marching. Notable players in the protests were Samuel Morville and Pauline Salingue, who were arrested.

The Basque language was demoted by the law, to be an "optional language" in schools. There has also been an effect on Corsican language instruction.

The long-term assessment is that while the law may have been necessary to prepare secondary students for the rigors of university education, its "minor alterations" were "conservative" both in outlook and curriculum.

== See also ==
- Common Core
- No Child Left Behind
