= Adoption in France =

Adoption in France is codified in the French Civil Code in two distinct forms: simple adoption and plenary adoption.

== Simple adoption ==
Simple adoption (French: adoption simple) is a type of adoption which allows some of the legal bonds between an adopted child and his or her birth family to remain. It is formalized under articles 343 and following of the French Civil Code.

Simple adoption is less restrictive in its requirements and less radical in effects than plenary adoption.

=== Requirements for adoption ===
- A single person of 28 years or older can adopt another person.
- It is necessary for the adoptive parent to be at least 15 years older than the adoptee, unless the adoptee is the child of the adoptive parent's spouse. In this case, the parent must be 10 years older than the adoptee.
- If the prospective adoptive parent is married, the consent of the spouse is needed. (Articles 361 and following of the Civil Code)

=== Consequences ===
- Adoption grants to the adoptee rights and duties equivalent to those of a legitimate child. Thus, for example, the name of the adoptive parents is added to the adoptee's original name, or replaces it.
- The adoptive parents gain exclusive parental authority over the child, though legal bonds of the adoptee with his or her family of origin are not broken. Thus, the adoptee preserves inheritance rights within his original family.
- The simple adoptee (and his children and stepchildren) have the ability to inherit from both families.
- The adoptee cannot inherit from the parents of the adoptive parents.
- An exception is made if the adoptive parent has children resulting from a preceding marriage.
- If the adoptee dies and leaves successors, rights of inheritance are determined by common law. If not, inheritance is divided, half going to the birth family and half to the adoptive family.
- Adoption has no consequences for the nationality of the adoptee, who can be of foreign nationality (this is possible if there are agreements with France).
- There is a maintenance obligation (obligation alimentaire) between the adoptee and adoptive parent. Between the adoptee and his birth parents, a similar obligation also exists, but it is only secondary: birth parents are bound by the obligation alimentaire only if the adoptee establishes that he or she could not obtain help from the adoptive parents.

=== Age of adoptee ===
- There is no condition on the age of the adoptee. The consent of the adoptee is necessary for adoptees of 13 years and older, and, for minor adoptees the agreement of his parents is needed.
- The future adoptee; no retraction after having given the agreement.
- There are no particular restrictions for adoptees past the age of majority.

== Plenary adoption ==
Plenary adoption (French: adoption plénière) is an alternate form of adoption which terminates the relationship between birth parent and child. Thus, all rights and status which the child may have had from the birth family are revoked and replaced with the rights and status granted by the adopting family.

The term "plenary adoption" distinguishes it from the other form of adoption practised in France, simple adoption, which allows some of the legal bonds between an adopted child and his or her birth family to remain.
