= Rashawn Griffin =

American artist, educator (b. 1980)

- Born: Rashawn Ryan Griffin; 1980 (age 45–46); Los Angeles, California, United States
- Education: Maryland Institute College of Art (BFA), Yale University (MFA)
- Occupations: Visual artist, educator
- Known for: Installation art, sculpture, multimedia art, painting

Rashawn Griffin (born 1980) is an American visual artist and educator. He has worked as an installation artist, sculptor, multimedia artist, and painter. His work explores identity and race. Griffin teaches at the University of Kansas.

== Early life and education ==
Rashawn Griffin was born in 1980, in Los Angeles, California. He was raised in Olathe, Kansas, and attended high school in Kansas City, Kansas.

Griffin received a BFA degree in 2002, from Maryland Institute College of Art (MICA); and a MFA degree in 2005, from Yale University.

== Career ==
Griffin teaches art in the department of visual art at the University of Kansas in Lawrence, Kansas.

He has been an artist-in-residence in 2006 at the Studio Museum in Harlem, and an artist-in-residence multiple times at the MacDowell Colony. Griffin received the Joan Mitchell Foundation Fellowship in 2017, and a grant in 2007.

He has participated in notable group exhibitions including the Whitney Biennial (2008) at Whitney Museum of American Art in New York City; and Minimal Baroque: Post-Minimalism and Contemporary Art (2014) at Rønnebæksholm in Næstved, Denmark.

Griffin's artwork is in museum collections, including at the Studio Museum in Harlem.

== Exhibitions ==
=== Solo exhibitions ===
- 2005, Rashawn Griffin: New Work, Triple Candie Project Space, New York City, New York, U.S.
- 2006, Rashawn Griffin: l'ours et les deux négociants, Galerie Eva Winkeler, Frankfurt, Hesse, Germany
- 2007, Rashawn Griffin, Central Utah Arts Center, Ephraim, Utah, U.S.
- 2008, Rashawn Griffin, Smith–Stewart gallery, New York City, New York
- 2012, A hole-in-the-wall country, Nerman Museum of Contemporary Art, Overland Park, Kansas, U.S.

=== Group exhibitions ===
- 2005, Is-Ness: Thomas Florschuetz, Rashawn Griffin, Lynn Marie Kirby, Thomas Erben Gallery, New York City, New York, U.S.
- 2007, The Red Badge of Courage, Newark Arts Council, Newark, New Jersey, U.S.; curated by Omar Lopez–Chahoud, featuring Rashawn Griffin, Chakaia Booker, Kevin Darmnaie, Rico Gatson, Adler Guerrier, Ben Jones, Jayson Keeling, Simone Leigh, Kevin Sampson, Xaviera Simmons, Shinique Smith, Juana Valdes, and Roberto Visani
- 2008, The Fullness of Time, Arndt & Partner, Zurich, Switzerland; curated by Rashida Bumbray, featuring Rashawn Griffin, William Cordova, and Leslie Hewitt
- 2008, Whitney Biennial, Whitney Museum of American Art, New York City, New York, U.S.; curated by Henriette Huldisch and Shamim M. Momin
- 2010, Unspecific Objects, Thierry Goldberg Projects, New York City, New York, U.S.
- 2011–2012, Clifford Owens: Anthology, group exhibition, P.S. 1 Contemporary Art Center, Queens, New York City, New York, U.S.; featuring Rashawn Griffin, Derrick Adams, Terry Adkins, Sanford Biggers, Aisha Cousins, Sherman Fleming, Coco Fusco, Charles Gaines, Malik Gaines, Rico Gatson, Lyle Ashton Harris, Maren Hassinger, Steffani Jemison, Jennie C. Jones, Nsenga A. Knight, Glenn Ligon, Dave McKenzie, Senga Nengudi, Lorraine O'Grady, Benjamin Patterson, William Pope.L, Jacolby Satterwhite, Xaviera Simmons, Shinique Smith, Kara Walker, and Saya Woolfalk
- 2014, Minimal Baroque: Post-Minimalism and Contemporary Art, Rønnebæksholm, Næstved, Denmark
