= Shinique Smith =

American visual artist (born 1971)

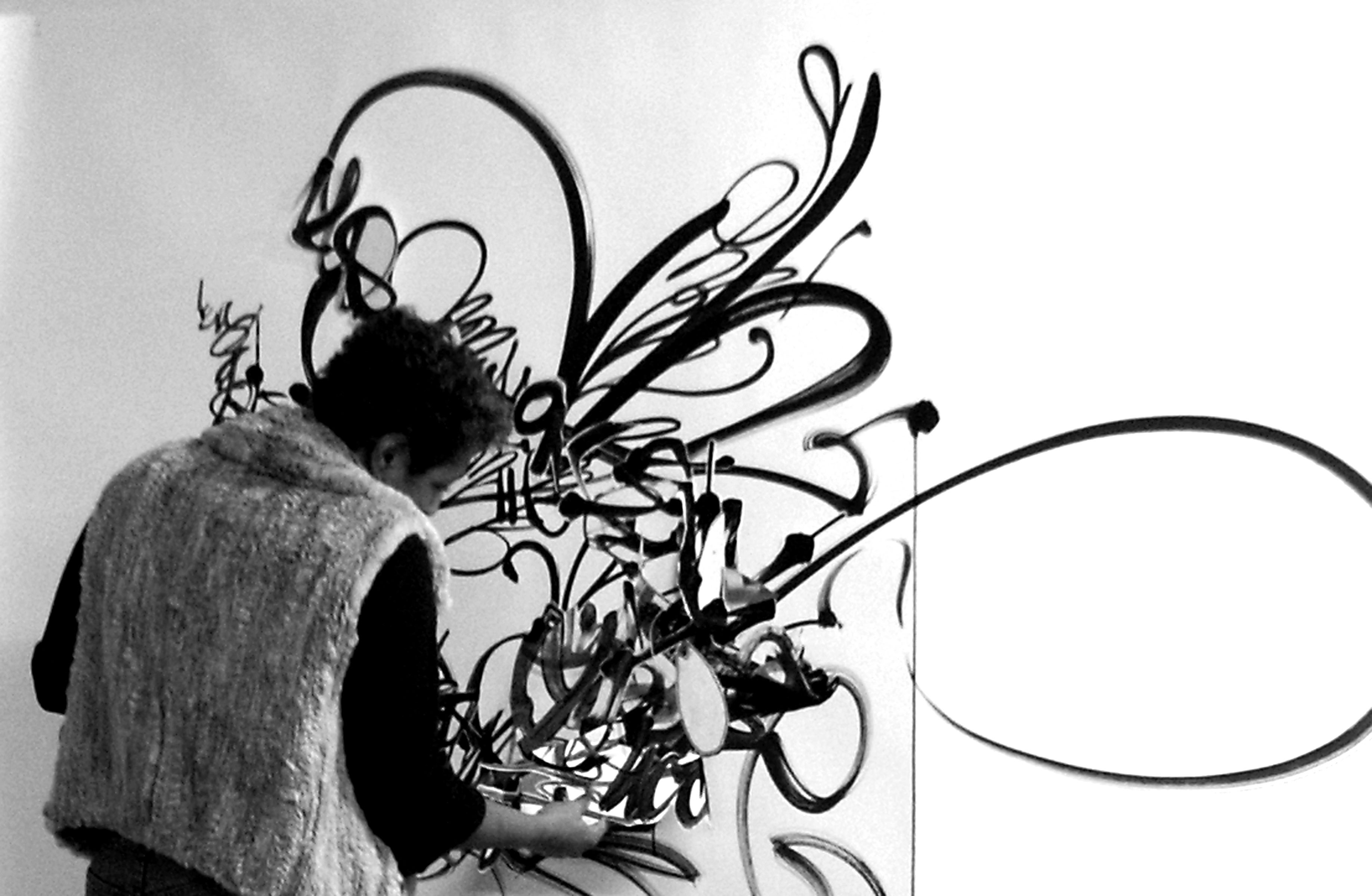
- Smith at work in her studio
- Born: 1971 (age 54–55); Baltimore, Maryland, United States
- Education: Maryland Institute College of Art (B.F.A.); Tufts University (M.A.Ed); Maryland Institute College of Art (M.F.A.)
- Awards: The Louis Comfort Tiffany Foundation
- Website: shiniquesmith.com

Shinique Smith (born January 9, 1971) is an American visual artist, known for her colorful installation art and paintings that incorporate found textiles and collage materials. She is based in Los Angeles, California.

== Early life and education ==
Born in 1971, in Baltimore, Maryland, Smith's artistic training began in childhood, encouraged toward the creative arts by her mother, a fashion editor. She began studying ballet at age four, and later attended the Baltimore School for the Arts.

In high school, Smith was influenced by artists in the Baltimore graffiti scene, an aesthetic also visible in her mature work. Her studies of Japanese calligraphy and abstraction in college also influenced her artistic development.

After earning her Bachelor of Fine Arts degree at Maryland Institute College of Art, Smith worked as a costumer and props assistant on movies such as Disclosure, Guarding Tess, Serial Mom, and That Night. From 1995 to 2000, Smith served on the advisory board of 911 Media Arts Center in Seattle, where she launched Seattle's first festival of African American film and video called Flav'a Fest. Described in the press as "an annual journey through the visions, lives and dreams of media makers of African ancestry," the festival hosted films by emerging and established filmmakers such as Cheryl Dunye, Cauleen Smith, Barbara McCullough, Kasi Lemmons, and Charles Burnett (who was honored by Flav'a Fest and Seattle Mayor Norm Rice at a special screening of Killer of Sheep in 1997).

After working in the film industry, Smith returned to her studies and earned a Master of Arts degree in education from Tufts University in 2000 and a Master of Fine Arts degree from the Maryland Institute College of Art in 2003. In 2003, Smith moved to New York and participated in The Lower Manhattan Cultural Council's artist studio residency, where she began making sculpture.

== Art and career ==
Shinique Smith combines fine art media with text, bright colors, and found objects, such as stuffed animals and clothing. She began to include used clothing in her work after reading a New York Times Magazine article about secondhand garments shipped to Africa from thrift stores. She describes her process as a personal one: "It all begins with emotion, an expression and I allow myself to go on a journey in the making of each work, a journey of associations between object and color, between lyrics and fabric, between the viewer and me."

Smith's art has been described as "kaleidoscopic," collecting "the vibrant, carefully collected debris of her life and career" and creating "graceful yet forceful combinations of many different materials and ideas." The Frist Art Museum has interpreted Smith's work as conveying her personal history as well as "a greater sense of cultural concern and connectivity."

Her work gained critical attention when The Studio Museum in Harlem exhibited her first bale sculpture in Frequency in 2005, an exhibition that helped launch the careers of other artists of Smith's generation such as Nick Cave, Kalup Linzy, Xaviera Simmons, and Hank Willis Thomas.

Smith's sculptural works were also prominently featured in the acclaimed launch exhibition of the New Museum, Unmonumental: The Object in the 21st Century, which featured works by Sam Durant, Urs Fischer, Isa Genzken, Elliott Hundley, and Jim Lambie to name a few. Smith's art was featured in 30 Americans, an exhibition of works by African American artists (including Jean-Michel Basquiat, Rashid Johnson, Kerry James Marshall, Lorna Simpson, Mickalene Thomas, Carrie Mae Weems, and Kehinde Wiley among others) in the permanent collection of the Rubell Museum in Miami that has toured extensively since 2009 and been a favored by critics and viewers at many museums across the U.S.

Since these exhibitions, Smith's works have been exhibited at numerous venues internationally, including a recent 2014 survey of her work BRIGHT MATTER at the Museum of Fine Arts Boston, where Jen Mergel, Senior Curator of Contemporary Art described the palette of Smith's works in the exhibition and use of found materials as "a product of United States culture especially from the 1980s." Mergel said the exhibition "reflects an essential aspect of Smith's practice: how to visually manifest emotional connection, belief and the resilience of human energy through gestures and materials that shape daily life. Her work is an embodiment of the powerful spectrum of expression that for Smith, leans toward joy.

Also in 2014, Smith was commissioned by The Rose F. Kennedy Greenway in Boston to create a mural for their rotating exhibition wall. Smith's work, Seven Moon Junction was nationally recognized as one of the Best Public Art Projects Annually by Americans for the Arts Public Art Year in Review. The Greenway also commissioned Smith to create an accompanying dance performance video, Gesture III: One Great Turning, a collaboration with Boston-based KAIROS Dance Theater, which was filmed on The Greenway in front Smith's mural.

== Awards and collections ==
Shinique Smith received an Art Purchase Prize from The American Academy of Arts and Letters in 2022, the Anonymous Was a Woman Award in 2016, The Louis Comfort Tiffany Foundation Award in 2013, The Maryland Institute College of Art's Alumni Medal of Honor in 2012, and a Joan Mitchell Prize in 2008. Smith's work is included in several permanent collections, including the Ackland Art Museum, Baltimore Museum of Art, Brooklyn Museum, Denver Art Museum, Los Angeles County Museum of Art, The Museum of Fine Arts, Boston, the Palmer Museum of Art, The Rubell Family Collection, Miami; the Minneapolis Institute of Art; and the Whitney Museum of American Art.

== Select solo exhibitions ==
2023:

- Shinique Smith: PARADE, The John and Mable Ringling Museum of Art, December 16, 2023 - January 5, 2025

2022:

- Shinique Smith: Stargazers, Nerman Museum of Contemporary Art, April 21, 2022 - July 31

2020:

- Shinique Smith: Grace Stands Beside, Baltimore Museum of Art, March 11 – August 9
- Indelible Marks, UBS Art Collection Gallery, New York, January 27 – June 10

2019:

- Indelible Marks, UBS Art Collection, UBS Lounge, Art Basel Miami, December 4–8

2018:

- Shinique Smith: Refuge, curated by Essence Harden, California African American Museum (CAAM), Los Angeles, California

2016:

- MOCA Jacksonville, Shinique Smith: Project Atrium Quickening, March 19 - June 26

2015:

- Shinique Smith: Wonder and Rainbows, The Frist Center for the Visual Arts, Nashville, TN; October 9 – January 10, 2016
- Threaded, Center for the Arts at Virginia Tech, Blacksburg, VA; February 12 – April 12, 2015

2014:

- Shinique Smith: BRIGHT MATTER, curated by Jen Mergel, Museum of Fine Arts, Henry and Lois Foster Gallery, Boston; August 23 - March 1, 2015
- Shinique Smith: Changing Rooms, Galerie Henrik Springmann, Berlin; March 15-April 15
- Arcadian Clusters, Eli and Edythe Broad Art Museum, East Lansing; February 7-June 1 (catalogue)

2013:

- Kaleidoscopic, David Castillo Gallery, Miami; May 17-July 6
- Shinique Smith: Bold As Love, James Cohan Gallery, New York; February 15-March 16
- Firsthand, Los Angeles County Museum of Art at Charles White Elementary, Los Angeles; Feb 8-July 19

2011:

- SHINIQUE SMITH: To the Ocean of Everyone Else, Brand New Gallery, Milan; November 10-December 23 (catalogue)
- The Urban Pastoral, Savannah College of Art and Design (SCAD), Pinnacle Gallery, Savannah GA; August 11-October 7 and (SCAD), Trois Gallery, Atlanta, April 25-July 22
- New Degree of Love, Galerie Zidoun, Luxembourg; June 9-July 31
- Shinique Smith: Menagerie, Madison Museum of Contemporary Art, Madison WI; January 22 - May 8 (catalogue)

2010:

- Every Brick, curated by Steven Matijcio, SECCA, Winston-Salem, NC; November 18-February 13, 2011
- Shinique Smith: Menagerie, Museum of Contemporary Art, North Miami, Miami FL; September 16 November 19 (Catalogue)
- Shinique Smith: No Words, Yvon Lambert, Paris; April 2-May 12
- My Heart Is My Hand, Illinois State University Galleries, Normal IL; February 16-March 28

2009:

- Ten Times Myself, Yvon Lambert, New York; May 21-July 31
- Shinique Smith: Like it Like that, Studio Museum in Harlem, New York; April 2-June 28

2008:

- Yvon Lambert, London; Good Knot, November 22-December 20, 2008
- Torch Songs, Curated by Isolde Brielmaier, Saltworks Gallery, Atlanta; April 19-May 30, 2008

2007:

- Shinique Smith: Lost & Found, Franklin Art Works, Minneapolis; June 9-July 29, 2007
- Shinique Smith: Open Strings, Skestos Gabriele Gallery, Chicago; March 9-April 7, 2007

2006:

- Shinique Smith: No dust, no stain, Cuchifritos Gallery, New York; October 7-November 11, 2006

2005:

- Overstock, The Proposition, New York; December 8-January 21, 2006 (essay by Greg Tate)
- FULL-ON!, Boulder Museum of Contemporary Art, Boulder CO; June 24-September 3, 2005

2002:

- Crossroads, The Creative Alliance, Baltimore, September - October, 2002
- Manifestations, Scuola dei Tiraoro e Battioro, Venice, Italy, June 2002 (Catalogue)

== Public projects ==
=== Rotating ===
- Peter Blum Gallery, a group exhibition Fabric features Shinique Smith's: Boston 2022 and Pieces of Grace 2020, May - July 2023
- "Aspen Art Museum at Elk Camp", a site specific project in Snowmass, Shinique Smith: Resonant Tides Nov 28, 2015-Sep 10, 2017
- Open Source, a citywide exhibition with Mural Arts in Philadelphia. A new mural and performance project, Shine Space
- Seven Moon Junction, Rose F. Kennedy Greenway Conservancy, Boston, September 2014 -August 2015 a temporary 70' x 76’ mural at Dewey Square Park in Boston.

=== Permanent ===
- "Only Love, Only Light", Los Angeles Metro Transit Authority, completion date 2017
- First Born of the Child's Sunrise, located in the Eddie C. and C. Sylvia Brown African American Department at the Enoch Pratt Free Library in Baltimore, MD - mixed media, completed 2016. https://commons.wikimedia.org/wiki/File:Shinique_Smith_plaque.jpg
- Joy's Way, The UCSF Medical Center at Mission Bay in San Francisco, completed 2014
- Mother Hale's Garden, Located at The Mother Clara Hale Bus Depot, New York MTA/Arts in Transit, New York - Permanent mosaic and hand painted art glass, 5,000 square feet, completed 2013
- Twilight and Dawn, Permanent murals at The Cosmopolitan Hotel and Casino in Las Vegas in collaboration with Art Production Fund, completed 2010.

== Performances ==
- Breathing Room: Bound and Loose - Performed at the Baltimore Museum of Art January 11, 2020.
- Breathing Room - Performed 2018 during Kansas City Open Spaces curated by Dan Cameron.
- Gesture III: One Great Turning - 2015, Filmed in front of Smith's mural Seven Moon Junction, with the use of aerial and ground videography performed by and in collaboration with the KAIROS Dance Company with sound & editing design by Gary Pennock.
- Gesture II: Between two breaths - Performed by Shinique Smith and Marisa Arriaga at Brooklyn Academy of Music on October 5, 2015, and Museum of Fine Arts, Boston as part of Shinique Smith: BRIGHT MATTER on February 11, 2015.
- Gesture I: Unraveling - Performed by Marisa Arriaga at Museum of Fine Arts, Boston as part of Shinique Smith: BRIGHT MATTER on September 7, 2014.

== Curatorial projects ==
- Elsewhere, Saltworks Gallery, Atlanta; Curated by Smith, A group exhibition exploring contemporary romantic themes of landscape, place and the pastoral with works by artists: Marcus Morales, Jane Benson, Christine Bailey, Justin Anderson, Erika Ranee, Sean Ryan, Mickalene Thomas and Jennie C. Jones.
- Cotton Candy on a Rainy Day, The Proposition, New York, November 2 -December 16, 2006; Curated by Smith, A group exhibition exploring contemporary melancholy through artworks by emerging and emergent artists; Ann Craven, Rashawn Griffin, Sean Ryan, Sigrid Sandstrom, Sabeen Raja, Jina Valentine, Christine Bailey, William Downs III, Elizabeth Bick and Kira Lynn Harris.
