= Evert Lundquist =

Swedish painter and graphic artist (1904–1994)

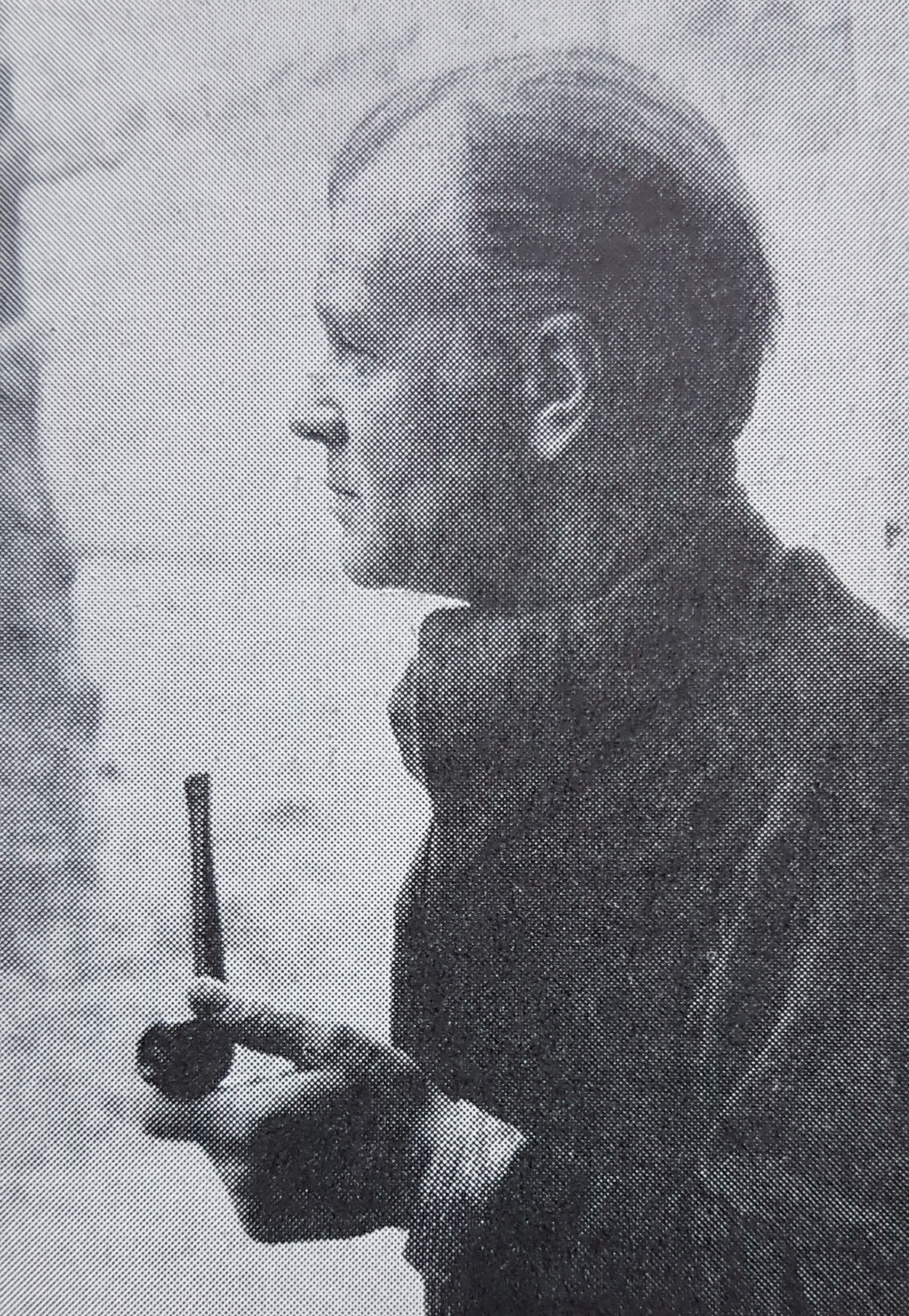
Evert Lundquist

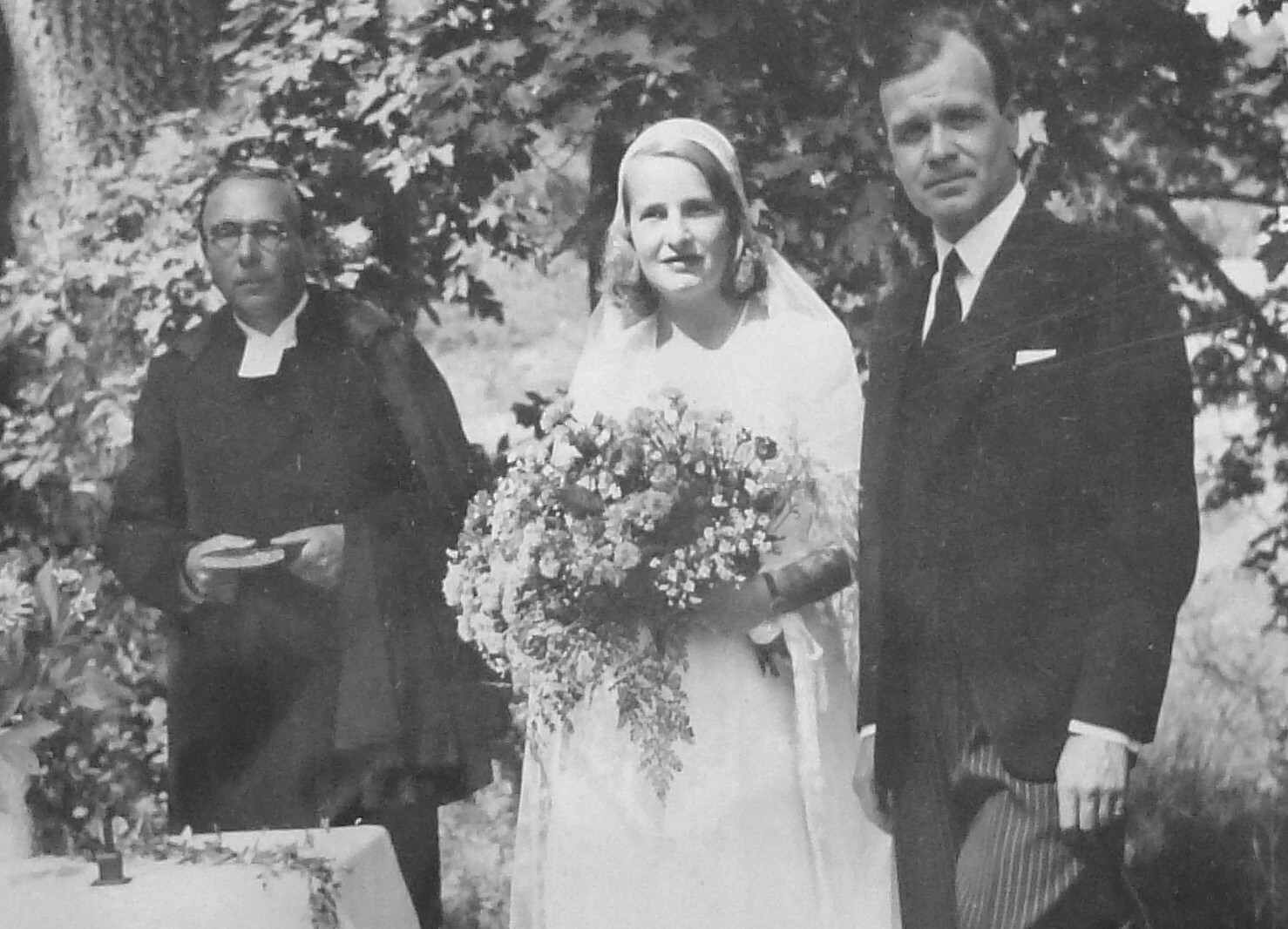
Evert Lundquist and Ebba Reutercrona in 1943

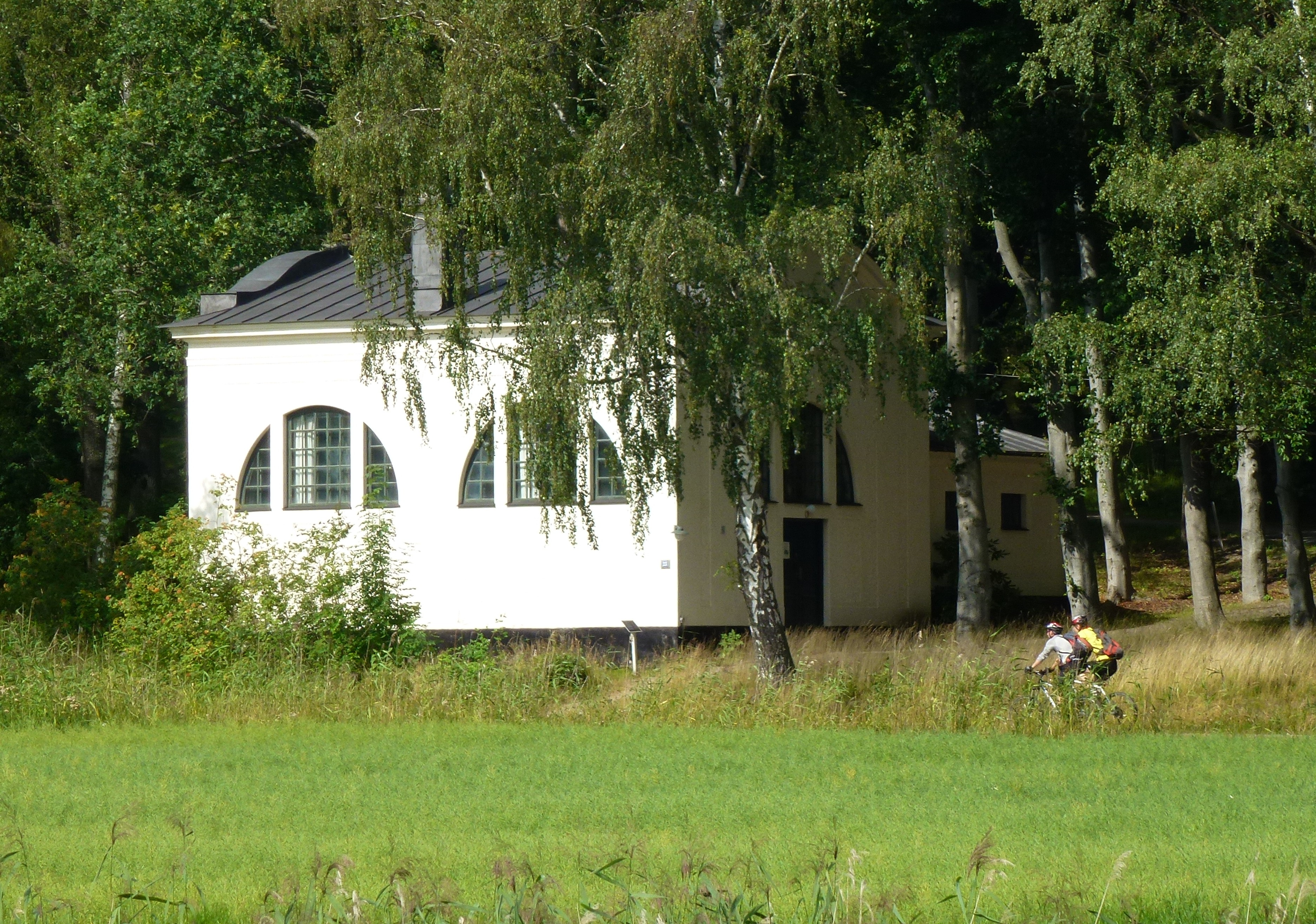
Evert Lundquist's studio

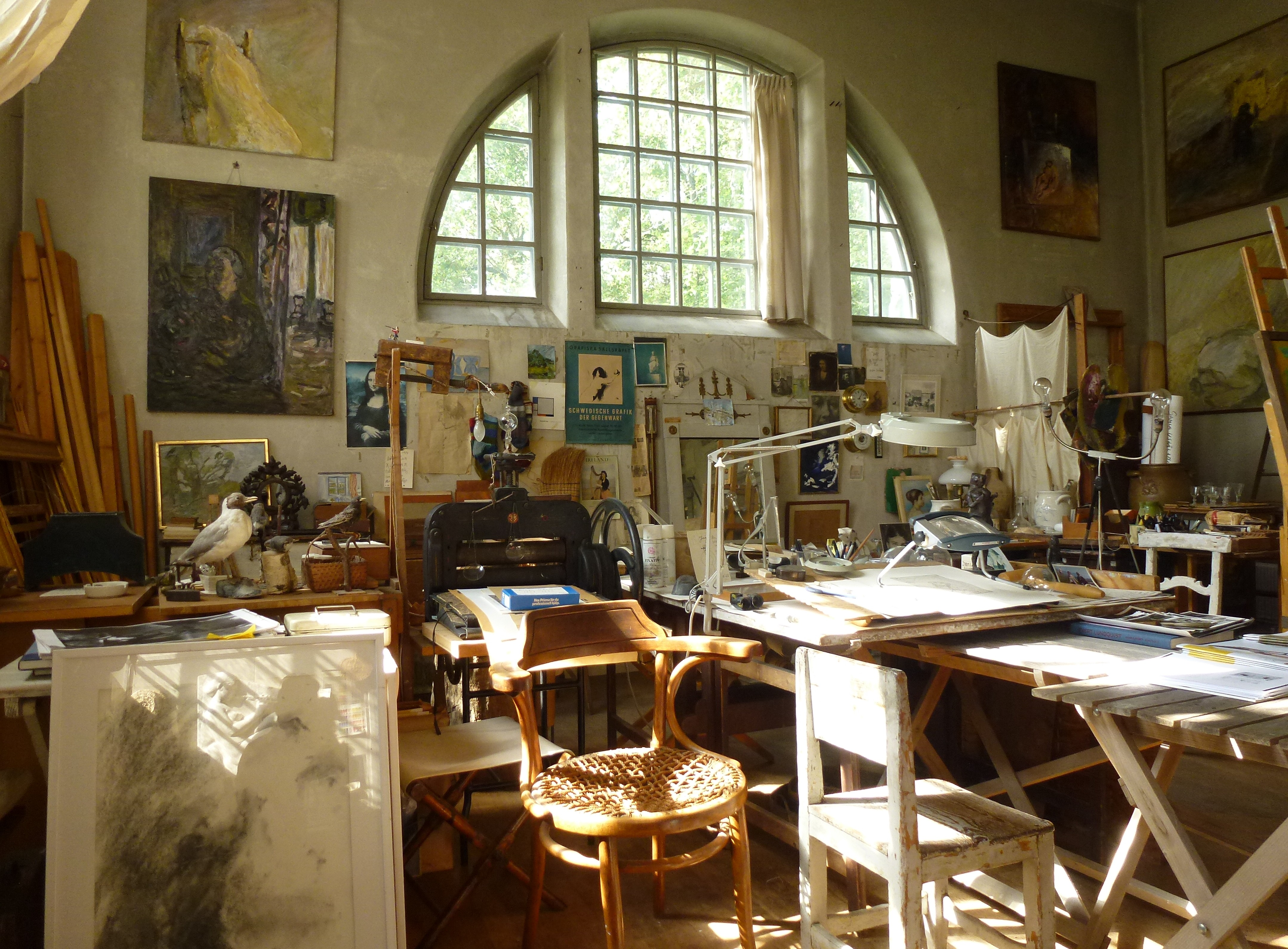
Studio interior

Evert Ernst Erland Olof Lundquist (17 July 1904 – 4 November 1994) was a Swedish painter and graphic artist. He was born in Stockholm, the son of a railway official, Ernst Lundquist and Olga Eugenia Maria Charlotta Lundquist (born Björck). Lundquist, byway of his mother's family, was a relative of famed singer Johanna Maria "Jenny" Lind and the painter Oscar Björck. He was the youngest of the three children; his brother Edvard was born in 1898 and sister Elsa in 1902. The family home was located in Stockholm at 9 Tegnérgatan. His early life has been described as middle class, proper and calm.

Lundquist had bouts of depression and illness which caused delays in his education. His depression was often exacerbated by the long and dark months of autumn in Sweden. Lundquist had experienced feelings of "gloom" as early as 1920. By 1929, he had entered into a rest home on the island of Lidingö to recuperate. Recurring depression, primarily during the autumn season, will become a reoccurring event in Lundquist's life. These personal adversities were generally unknown to the public as Lundquist created a public narrative that presented him in a style that he favored. His desire to obscure and hide the unpleasant and uncontrolled aspects of his life has led to suggestions of a parallel/corollary to his artwork.

He lived and worked in Saltsjö-Duvnäs, on the outskirts of Stockholm. Here during the late 1940s and early 1950s, Evert Lundquist along with his wife and fellow artist Ebba Reutercrona, joined artists Roland Kempe and Staffan Hallström in living together at Olle Nyman's family home in Saltsjö-Duvnäs. This grouping of artists began to be identified as the "Saltsjö-Duvnäs Group". The group was rather loosely based and followed no set ideology or philosophical premise. They were, however, centered on an exploration of the material nature of painting, "from the small perspective, with the point of departure in the poetry of rural everyday life."

In the first part of the 1980s, a gradual deterioration in Lundquist's vision began leading him to paint less. Lundquist used labels with very large text attached to his tubes of paint to facilitate his recognition of the colors they contained. This helped the artist to eliminate any errors in his work, which was of critical importance as his limited eyesight forced him to finish any painting in one single session. The last known paintings by Lundquist occurred in 1989–1990.

In 1984, Lundquist published his autobiography, From the Life of a Painter (in Swedish Ur ett Målarliv). The autobiography reaffirmed much of his personal "narrative" which Lundquist preferred to share publicly.

Evert Ernst Erland Olof Lundquist died on 4 November 1994 in Stockholm.

== Education/educator in the arts ==
Lundquist remembered creating his first painting at age fourteen in 1918. The work was a man with red hair which he created using his mother's porcelain paints. As a private student, Lundquist studied for and received his bachelor's degree in 1923; he then felt free to pursue his interest in painting. Beginning on 15 January 1924, Lundquist formally began his education in the arts at Carl Wilhelmson's painting school in Stockholm. Lundquist remembered the pleasure he took in his realization that his technical skills were developing and also his surprise when his teacher introduced a nude model for drawing class.

He then briefly attended Edward Berggren's painting school. Berggren had established the school with friend and fellow artist Gottfrid Larsson in 1920. Later in May 1924, Lundquist traveled to Wimereux, France to study plaster under artist Jean Cottenet, and to learn French. (Cottenet would shortly, thereafter, go on to teach Henri Cartier-Bresson after his parents, frustrated with Henri's thrice failing his baccalaureate exams, gave into his desire to become an artist.) While in Wimereux, Lundquist lived at "La Ruche", a villa owned by the Cottenet family. During the summer, he painted his first landscape during a car trip to Les Neyrolles, France. Lundquist recalled the period well and claimed this was how he acquired the "French Spirit" which he felt never left him.

He then went on to the esteemed Académie Julien in Paris, where he not only took notice of the dirty windows and clutter but also of the school's success in teaching world renown artists. Studying under Paul Albert Laurens, Lundquist drew from ten a.m. to four p.m., working for several days to produce a drawing that would be considered "complete". Lundquist also recalled his time spent wandering the halls of the Louvre Museum to study important artists as being significant to his artistic education

In May 1925, he returned to Sweden, living in Berg, and immersed himself in philosophy and the Nordic culture. By August, he was enrolled at Berggren's painting school in what was ostensibly a preparatory course for his eventual admission into the Royal Swedish Academy of Arts. In September, he enrolled at the Royal Swedish Academy of Arts (1925–1931) where, once again, he was a student under Carl Wilhelmson. Lundquist's acceptance into the Royal Swedish Academy of Arts made him feel that the world was open to him; he called it a "high". While studying with Wilhelmson, a young Lundquist was advised by another student to find his own style instead of trying to imitate Leonardo da Vinci. Wilhelmson, overhearing the conversation, rejected the student's advice. He felt in Lundquist's quest to become self-realized, it was important to "love something higher (and to) study the masters." Lundquist recalled that Wilhelmson was one of the few people, if not the only, who believed in his abilities. Nonetheless, Lundquist applied and was accepted into the school's decorative department where Olle Hjortzberg was his teacher. Lundquist felt this "experiment' was unsuccessful and "bore meager fruit." He cited his "artistic snobbery" from preventing him from creating the pastiches required of him. Despite having, on occasion, harvested "meager fruit", Lundquist believed his time at the academy was well spent. Beyond his education as an artist, the academy had fostered a break with his introspection and shyness, and he had made many good friends. During his time there, Lundquist was given the nickname "Ludde", a name his friends and fellow artists would continue to use during his lifetime.

In 1959, Lundquist began to teach painting at The Gerlesborgskolan School of Fine Arts. In 1960, he would also teach at Konsthögskolan (Royal Institute of Art), a position he would continue in for the next ten years.

== Recognition, exhibitions and awards (partial) ==
His first exhibition was at the Konstnärshuset in Stockholm in 1934, but he became popular only in the 1940s.

Noted art historian Olle Granath felt, "Evert Lundquist's breakthrough as an artist came with an exhibition at Konstnärshuset (Swedish Artists' Association) in 1941, when he was thirty-seven years old."

An equally significant retrospective was presented by Konstnärshuset only three years later in 1944 at the Royal Academy of Art. The exhibition has been described as a major breakthrough with the Swedish public. The retrospective received positive reviews and widespread coverage of the event. This attention was followed by increased public recognition for Lundquist.

In 1956 Lundquist suggested and created a mosaic piece titled Trädet. The mosaic extends throughout three floors of the then newly built town hall in Skellefteå.

According to friend and fellow artist Cliff Holden, Lundquist enjoyed holding a retrospective every ten years or so at the Stockholm Academy of Art. The retrospective in 1957 generated a level of admiration that had "not been seen even in Sweden for a long time."

In the late 1950s and early 1960s he participated in exhibitions in Paris, London and Milan.

Lundquist was chosen to represent Sweden at the IV Bienal do Museu de Arte Moderna in São Paulo, Brazil in 1957. Artworks that were selected for inclusion, including works by Lundquist, were destroyed by fire aboard the transport ship carrying them. The catalog for the Bienal, with a forward to Lundquist's works written by Dr. Hugo Zuhr, list five works by Lundquist; A Arvore (1949), O Passaro (1956), Criança Comendo (1957), Nos Campos (1957) and Corpo De Boi (1957). While Cliff Holden states that all of Lundquist's works for the Bienal were lost in this fire, some contemporary literature states the loss of only three paintings.

The Tate Gallery, in 1958, acquired Lundquist's painting Woman in Red. With this acquisition, Lundquist became one of only two Swedish artists then held in the collection, the other being Edvard Munch.

Lundquist was awarded the Prince Eugen Medal for painting in 1961. The Renaissance Society of Chicago hosts a Lundquist Exhibition from 13 to 31 May 1961.

The Museum of Modern Art's Committee on the Museum's Collections (serving at the request of MOMA's chairman James Thrall Soby) voted to acquire and to add Lundquist's Pottery Number Nine, oil on canvas, to its collection in 1961.

In 1964, Lundquist was presented the Guggenheim award. During the same year he served as the representative for Sweden at the Venice Biennale in 1964.

Lundquist's artwork was presented in exhibitions at the Dunn International. The Tate Gallery included Lundquist in their 1964 exhibition "54–64, Paintings & Sculpture of a Decade".

In 1974, a Lundquist retrospective was held at Moderna Museet in Stockholm, Sweden.

In 1980, Lundquist exhibited with fellow artist (and spouse) Ebba Reutercrona.

In 2010 the Moderna Museet, with curator Fredrik Liew, launched an exhibition of Lundquist's works. This innovative and far-reaching exhibit sought to remove the constrictions of previously held interpretations, not only of Lundquist's work, but of Lundquist himself.

== Acquisition of Woman in Red by the Tate Gallery in 1958 ==
The Tate Gallery was created in 1897 and has since amassed a collection of objects from 1500 AD to the present time. The artists chosen to be part of the modern and contemporary art collection are chosen for merit and their contributions to the world of art. In the late 1950s Lundquist's fellow artist and supporter Cliff Holden, who had long believed that Lundquist was one of only two artists who could legitimately represent Sweden internationally, began a campaign to encourage the Tate to accept Lundquist's work into its collection. Woman in Red, a work from the collection of Nils Tesch, was accepted into the collection. Previous to this acquisition, the only other Swedish painter to be collected by the Tate was Edvard Munch. The work titled Woman in Red has been part of the Tate collection since that time.

== Interpretations of Lundquist's style and artworks ==
Lundquist's recognition as a significant artist did not come quickly or precisely. He had traveled often and extensively and found himself in the midst of a world war (the second of his life), and his painting style would transverse a number of artistic styles. After 1940, Lundquist would develop a stylistic form for which he would become very well known, though he would continue to innovate. Noted art historian and former Director of Collections at the Tate Modern, Jeremy Lewison, notes that the mature style of Lundquist has distinct qualities. The motif is not painted directly on the surface nor is it under the surface. The motif is "within [...] paint and form are one". Lundquist's experiments preceded the similar experimentation of artists Auerbach, Kossoff and Hodgkin who also went on to artistic acclaim. Lundquist's method seems to have allowed the paint a certain freedom to suggest the initial form. Once the work developed, the final and generally delicate last layer of paint would function to save the work from any "potential chaos." The final work was neither a full abstraction nor a figuration when finished. In a sense, Lundquist had bridged the conflict between those who favored abstraction and those who felt as strongly against it. This concept was similar to Pierre Bonnard's work in which his desire to create a full abstraction was tempered by the desire to create a subject. The strong identification the viewer would normally have toward the subject is lessened, as the subject "has been translated into formal terms." Art critic/commentator Peter Cornell noted that unlike Bonnard, Lundquist was not trying to present the pleasantries of life. In fact, with Lundquist, there is a degree of menace, "... formless matter takes over, breaks down and destroys". The degree of innovations and experimentation which Lundquist himself identified and distinguished in his works are divided into no less than eleven periods over the years of 1924 and 1957. To the general public, and indeed to art historians, much of this evolution in style would be unnoticed to the degree that Lundquist himself would recognize.

In the mid/late 1920s and up to the mid-1930s, Lundquist painted in the styles that were most prevalent at the time. For lecturer Teddy Brunius of Uppsala University, that Lundquist may be seen in earlier works to have referenced Edvard Munch was natural. What separated Lundquist from those who were only imitators of Munch was Lundquist's artistic "independence" and his artistic temperament which was that of a "pioneer". Given his artistic ability to paint in these styles, and his innovative ability to make them his own without imitation, it would have been natural to assume that he would continue to do so. However, in the mid-1930s, he began to alter his style of painting. Lundquist himself felt that he had now reached a level of his own maturity as an artist, and that his works of this period reflected this. He described his new stylistic developments as a, "solid, monumentally simplified and architecturally closed form and a synthesizing color form; the basic element of my artistic attitude." Writer Rolf Söderberg described Lundquist's use of color as vivid and intense. Lundquist had begun to break from an emphasis on the neutral tones, he had begun to use others such as "ice green, violet, orange, flesh red". Jardin du Luxembourg (1933–1934), which was included in Lundquist's debut exhibition in 1934, is a relevant example of his early works. In this present example, the artist has moved away from a rather straightforward attempt at portraying landscapes or still life which he had done earlier in his career. The painting demonstrates the "simplified architecture" and "synthesis of color" that Lundquist cited as part of his artistic process of the period. Brushstrokes in Jardin du Luxembourg are heavy, clearly defined and visible. While they do function to create the final image, they are not logical in relation to the subject matter. As they create the image, they do not support it by subjecting themselves individually to it. The brushstrokes become "individuals" that Lundquist has "applied to describe themselves." This "conflict" of brushstroke, as irrational and independent from subject, would continue to be developed and used by Lundquist during this time and in later works. Kvinnorna vid brunnen, painted in 1938, is also an example of this period. The painting depicts two women in a simplified form but within a cohesive structure. The dark color of the women contrast pointedly against the deep reds surrounding them. Nonetheless, the color and structure form a coherent whole to tell us about what we are viewing. The women are featureless, therefore color tone, composition and structure must guide the viewer's interpretations. While the paintings have elements which evoke the styles of Henri de Toulouse-Lautrec and James Ensor, they also have stylistic elements which were Lundquist's own innovations and which will become his hallmarks. Art critic Olle Granath believed that works like Jardin du Luxembourg were harbingers of what would eventually come to be Lundquist's style for the next fifty years.

While Lundquist may have initially felt that he had reached his mature style in the mid-1930s, he continued to change and develop. After 1939, Lundquist's more recognized style would begin to develop though he would continue to evolve and refine his style further, particularly after 1950. Olle Granath felt that Lundquist's art, had begun to revolve around his interpretation of the elements of fire, air, water and the earth. He premised that Lundquist had made a major artistic development and had found a fifth element in the actual impasto and color of his painted surfaces, which by their interplay with the subject matter gave weight to the other four elements. Color was its own light; it was light which reflected out from the canvas and thus freed itself from the earthy elements while simultaneously highlighting them in the process. For Granath, to look at a Lundquist painting was to be "drenched by giant waves or refreshed by a bubbling spring, to be dazzled by the fire of the sun and guided by the burning light..." Lundquist's 1941 Parklandskap is an example of this concept. The intensity of its color/impasto, depicting a dazzling sky/sun, seems to generate its own searing light/heat while highlighting the earthly elements of the landscape. As Lundquist said himself "it should smell hot", when (the artwork) is finished". In Parklandskap the viewer is facing the dramatic conflict between day and night. As the sun's rays dissipate into darkness, the sky blazes and illuminates the landscape in its hot, but final, light. Branches of a tree and a lone and simple farmer's plow stand in opposition to the dramatics/transitions of the moment. In the fleeting marriage between the contradictions of day and night, the viewer can grasp the fragility of the moment itself while the simplest elements, that of the farmer's plow and tree branches, remain the constants. It is an example of what Brunius notes as Lundquist's use of a restricted color register. The work is homogeneous yet still creates an atmosphere that is intense, "the surface of the canvas like fire and embers". This work also serves to highlight the ties between the viewer (man) and nature while also highlighting man's encounter with nature, both of which Granath felt were major themes for Lundquist.

Lundquist's works during the 1950s, and thereafter, established a dialogue between what would be considered the traditional and its counterpart, innovation. Everyday objects, painted as still life contrasted with the ever-changing and dynamic light surrounding them by which "an all-embracing – non-hierarchical – composition is created, all of its parts of equal value." In 1962, Lundquist created Det vita bordet (Bordet). In this painting, Lundquist allows the objects portrayed to be "born by the light". The light from the painting radiates to the viewer, inviting the viewer into an intimate and self-illuminating world. Each object portrayed in Det vita bordet seems ready to reveal its inner mystery to the viewer, one by one, each object having its own independent and equal value. By 1964, Lundquist had reached a peak in his technical and artistic ability as demonstrated in his 1964 work Hatten. In this example, the simplicity of the motif belies the complex and diverse synthesis of light, color and textural form which Lundquist has created using the powerful brushstrokes of a mature abstract expressionist. Still, for all the dynamics of Lundquist's painted surfaces, what was ostensibly to become the subject matter of the painting would often remain a singular, simple "everyday object". Another recurring motif was the humble coffee cup. Museum curator and art critic Ulf Linde stated that Lundquist "found" the cup during a trip by car in Northern France. Lundquist envisioned the simple object as animate, alive. He viewed its whiteness as a "world of color" that was both celestial and earthly, this earthiness reinforced by its primitive design. As Granath's concept explained, Lundquist's coffee cup radiated and illuminated by its own inner virtue which only highlighted its inherent simplicity. Lundquist's 1972 Kaffekoppen is an example of this theory/motif. The cup seems indeed alive, and its whiteness produces its own world of color that illuminates the canvas and radiates outward. Director and writer Bengt Lagerkvist asked his readers if they could imagine any object as simple as a coffee cup becoming the central motif in a work of art. Yet, Lundquist had done it successfully, bathing the cup in glistening light, "as secretive as that around Rembrandt's Bohemian Glass ". Moderna Museet's curator Fredrik Liew views Lundquist's work as a "union of opposites, most frequently between what is fixed and monumental on the one hand, and delicate and transient on the other[...]" He asserts that the viewer is compelled to view the work as a complex dynamic and should focus on the divergent elements in the painting and how they relate to each other. For Liew, the works sway between "the motif to the painterly process and back again." It is a process by which the motif and the artistic process maintain independence, while throughout the work there remains the underlying constants of "monumentality" versus dissipation and fragility. Lundquist's painterly contractions and equivocations establish him not as a "bourgeois artist who portrayed the light and timeless motifs in the classical tradition", but as a fundamental artist of his era and one that continues to guide artists of modern times.

Lundquist was discovering the complex inner virtues of the most mundane of objects. He was using the hues of his impasto, his motifs and brushstrokes to create a rich and complex pictorial language of conflict/resolution between "monumentality" and that of dissipation and fragility. To some, his "violent" potent brushstrokes and his use of color drew comparisons to de Kooning and Dubuffet, though Lundquist was recognized as being "independent" from them. Even so, some of his ardent supporters, while appreciating the aesthetics of his works, had not gone "beyond" the surface of the works; they lacked understanding, or often a concept, of the potential subtexts held within the works. An example of this narrow interpretation can be found in the description of Lundquist's work by the Guggenheim Foundation. In 1964 the Solomon R. Guggenheim Foundation presented Lundquist with an award and the foundation also included in their exhibition Lundquist's Urn** (1960 oil on canvas.). Their description of Lundquist's work/style stated, "his use of massive impasto can be linked [...] with forms described less according to visual appearance than to a tactile sense of mass. Bulky and resistant bodies, crowded and sloping spaces, are realized by the weight of the paint, heaped and pressed, in analogues of our bodily sense of weight, balance, and touch." (A black and white image of Urn can be seen on page fifty-eight at citation.) The Art critic and museum curator Lawrence Alloway, in his review of Lundquist's 1960 exhibition at Beaux Arts Gallery, had made a similar and somewhat superficial assessment; "Instead of using paint to create a visual illusion, Lundquist uses it like clay and models the picture." Wall Street Journal writer J. S. Marcus wrote, succinctly if not profoundly, that Lundquist was a "near-abstract artist" who was able to produce works that tantalized byway of tensions created through the rich textured impasto backgrounds and the motifs.

Lundquist was often hesitant to discuss the question of why he painted as he did, as opposed to the "technicalities" of his art. This was particularly true in his later years. Eva Ottoson, a friend of the Lundquist family, recalls a patient but firm Lundquist rejecting an interviewer's repeated requests for an explanation, not of painterly technique, but rather "why he painted as he did". Finally, Lundquist still pleasant but tired of the question offered his answer saying, "Well it just happens".

**The work Urn or Urnan in Swedish was later shown at the Lars Bohman Gallery after Lundquist's death. In the catalog for the exhibition, with text by Olle Granath, the same painting is shown on page thirty-three in a different orientation than is shown in the Guggenheim catalog of 1964. Additionally, a slight variation in the stated size is noted and the date of the work is given as 1960. The date given by the Guggenheim is 1961. Fredrik Liew notes other works had been shown not only in different orientations but also with other names, he cites Torso (1961) as one such example. Torso was also called Stilleben.

== Parallels with British Artist Bloomberg ==
As noted, the early 1940s were a pivotal time for Lundquist. His style was changing, somewhat radically, from his previous aesthetics. What would generally now be termed modern abstract art, was in its prime development stages in the early 1940s, particularly in the United States. In many ways, Lundquist and other European artist were developing similar approaches to art independently of other artists. Artist Cliff Holden made such an observations when he first saw Lundquist's works. He found the works to be quite a revelation. He felt Lundquist and his mentor, artist David Bloomberg, had been creating similar works; The artists were paralleling the "philosophy, theory and practice" of the other. The artists had begun to create images "in mass" as opposed to images which used detail for narration. Bloomberg, at the Borough Polytechnic, would later teach artists Frank Auerbach and Leon Kossoff. Auerbach and Kossoff are often referenced as having stylistically similarities with Lundquist.

That two or more artists may follow a similar trajectory while unknown to each other, and unaware of the esthetics of the other artist, is familiar. An example can be found in the early beginnings of pop art. A baffled (and somewhat suspicious) Andy Warhol could not account for the similarity of his work and the work of Roy Lichtenstein, the most obvious differences being that Lichtenstein continued to rely more on the painterly process while Warhol had already begun to apply the concept of commercial appeal and early ideas of mass-production to his art.

== Significance to contemporaries and current artists ==
Lundquist is recognized today as a key artist in modern Swedish art and its development. Lundquist's contemporaries, as well as current artists, recognize his importance and contributions.

Leif Mattsson recalled how he had seen young artist respond "with curious looks" and "dropped chins" when they were confronted with the effusive "artistic power" of works by Lundquist. Amusingly, Mattison quipped that when students had seen the techniques Lundquist used, "the pasty color, the carvings, the furrows" the techniques themselves appeared like "swear words in the church". The way that Lundquist mastered and used paint, paint that was itself something of a constantly changing and living thing and intrinsically difficult to tame, made him of "considerable rank." Yet, he did not compromise, his works were "raw" and represented "compositional simplicity."

Torsten Andersson felt that Lundquist had created a new type of visual language, and that the canvases after the late 1930s had broken away and come to life. He noticed a correlation between the weight (of impasto) and the deeper (and heavier) meanings of the paintings.

Georg Baselitz claimed that after seeing an "axe" painting (an important motif in Lundquist's oeuvre) he questioned whether he himself should begin again as an artist. The painting continued to inspire this question in him some 46 years after seeing it.

Kjell Strandqvist, felt that Evert Lundquist was one of the few painters who had the ability and knowledge which enabled him to successfully use his "artistic space". Lundquist's method of painting, the use of a large brush to create a limited brushstroke, generated a certain type of abstraction, "a free relation to mimesis." The motifs of the paintings did not escape, entirely free, from the copious "oily traces of his color" but were materially substantive enough to "convince us". They hovered between "creation and decay" allowing for an interesting dynamic to exist within the paintings. Irrespective of the strong form, "we feel that the resolution is within reach."

Sigrid Sandström traveled to Vaxholm to visit the painting Kvinna vid den vita muren (Woman by the White Wall) by Lundquist. She commented not only on how she could see the influence on later artists such as Peter Doig but also noticed references to Arnold Böcklin (1827–1901) and Ivan Aguéli (1869–1917). The paint's color/impasto portrayed the light so that it seemed hot and exotic. She says, "I was struck by the way the febrile brushwork seemed to have a life of its own independently of the subject matter[...]lacking in rhythm[...] it covers the surface, demanding attention. Those areas that appeared to be transparent turn out to be very thickly painted." She felt that the motif chosen by Lundquist was something of a ruse, just a hint at the true message.

Per Kirkeby argued that Lundquist was held out, by some, to be the return of actual "painting". He felt this was a facile claim as Lundquist had been painting "underground" and was still painting even as many were just beginning to see through "postulated painting". As an artist, Lundquist was not touched or moved by the demands or temptations of the world but rather painted because it was what he must do; it was what he was.

Andreas Eriksson recalled naming Lundquist her favorite painter, she found the early 1940s paintings by Lundquist had become important to her on an artistic level as she began to explore her own narrative. She found the manner in which Lundquist mixed the pigments directly upon his canvases created a unique interplay between motif and color. She found this method contrasted with his later works which tended toward inner movement and multi-layers of paint. Ericsson stated, "it is Lundquist's way of handling pigment that frequently makes him a rather divided painter. I think it is this that also makes him one of my artistic companions and favorites."

Artist Andre Forge spoke to BBC Radio 3 on 3 March 1960 to express his opinion that Lundquist had achieved an equality between his motif and form (brushstroke/impasto) and materials (paint/color) that was unprecedented in modern European artists. He contrasted Lundquist's achievement with the Cubist promise to do so, claiming the cubist had "formulated the intention, then dropped it in a maze of half-solutions". To Forge, Lundquist was of exceptional importance as "he has placed the reality of his subject-matter and the reality of his picture as an object on the same level. And he has done this without any artificial fracturing of the different levels on which the picture is read".(During the interview Forge misidentifies the name of Lundquist's Painting at the Tate calling it Girl at a Window. The name of the painting is Woman in Red.)

British artist Cliff Holden felt Lundquist's use of "tonal range and thick impasto" was reminiscent of Jo Tilson and artists of the Beaux Arts Gallery, but was quick to point out that Lundquist had not used this as a trick or "gimmick". In Lundquist's works, the impasto came about, "in the passionate wrestling with the material which he tries to bring to life in an image which each time is the result of a unique experience... (Lundquist's works preceded but anticipated) Nicholas de Stael, yet without falling into that morass of conflict between the figurative and non-figurative quality of images. Like Bomberg, Lundquist works towards a synthesis of the two attitudes." Holden, recalling Lundquist's interests in the philosophies of Schopenhauer and Wittgenstein, felt Lundquist aims could be framed in a quotation from the Tractatus Logico-Philosophicus; "The picture represents a possible state of affairs in logical space. The picture contains the possibility of the state of affairs, which it represents. The picture agrees with reality or not, it is right or wrong, true or false. The picture represents what it represents, independently of its truth or falsehood, through the form of representation. What the picture represents is its sense. In the agreement or disagreement of its sense with reality, its truth or falsity consists."

== Concern with perceptions of his work and style ==
Lundquist was concerned with clarifying and crafting the perception of his art by written annotation. To achieve a lasting and personal statement on himself and his work, Lundquist wrote. He wrote about his paintings, the artistic style, what he was attempting to achieve, detailed self critiques and about himself. He would continue this practice during his lifetime and he, at least initially, would have a direct influence on how his works were viewed.

To some, the artist seemed to subject his work to an "almost maniacal analysis" writing both causal and detailed notes on his own artwork. Early in his career, Lundquist was, in fact, criticized for this "over analysis". In 1945, respected art critic Gustav von Platen said as much when he criticized Lundquist, not for his artwork, but for recording "every little shift and change of temperature (in his work) ... (and) for being self-involved to the point of narcissism". Such criticism seemed to do little to deter Lundquist's desire to explain and contextualize his works. For the remainder of his life, he would be a regular visitor to the Nationalmuseum Archives (Sweden) where he made further notes on the materials held about him there. His additions alone fill a full eleven volumes of the total seventy-seven volumes held at the archive. In 2015, Emilia Ström arranged and described the various volumes Lundquist donated to the archive along with material already in their possession, making them available byway of the online Visual Arkiv system. Much of the archive retains the "disorder" that is part of Lundquist's "method" in describing and sorting his own notes and additions. Ström and the Nationalmuseum Archives made the decision to maintain this "disorder" so that the archive would reflect, "the context of the documents. The archive – like Lundquist's own art – thus becomes an expression of self-reflection and introspection." Much of the general description of the documents is available online, however the actual documents have not been scanned for online viewing. For a listing of Lundquist's personal archive go to: https://sok.riksarkivet.se/nad? and enter "Evert Lundquist" to bring up relevant materials. For a listing of other documentation held go to : Riksarkivet – Sök i arkiven. To see and review the actual documents, patrons must select and order the documents they are interested in and these documents will then be made available in the Art Library's reading room. The Art Library's room remains open at this time, contact for Covid/pandemic guidelines.

In reading the extensive notes that Lundquist left, Frederick Liew had the perception that Lundquist may have actually restricted the deeper understanding of his work. Lundquist was the artwork's creator, and given this, his words had been presented and often received as absolutes. Liew felt that Lundquist's great efforts to define not only his work but his personal life (which was not described entirely factually) served to conceal rather than reveal his works and his life. Ulf Linde wrote the preface of the second edition of Lundquist's autobiography. This edition, which was published after the artist's death, may have given Linde a freer hand in writing his own perceptions about Lundquist. Linde writes that what Lundquist says in the book is true. He assures readers that Lundquist was as he claimed to be – as far as his claims went. However, Linde seemingly opens the door to speculation that some truth(s) had indeed been excluded from the narrative. Linde writes, "but[...] would he really have painted the way he did if he were the person he recalled in his memoirs?"

Despite the eleven full volumes of notes and critiques he created, he continued to assert no intent to study his art. Within the volumes of notes left by Lundquist, there is a copy of Gustav von Platen's 1945 critique. Lundquist has underlined Platen's words, "for being self-involved to the point of narcissism". He has duly attached his own addendum to the critique in which he declares himself innocent of "any attempt at pursuing a detailed study of my art".

=== Desire to craft public persona ===
While Lundquist was concerned with clarifying and crafting the perception of his art by annotation, he was also carefully creating a public persona that was not congruent with the actualities of his life. Art critic and cultural commentator Björn Widegren premised that Lundquist felt if he could keep his demons locked in the basement, "in some way they would remain silent." Lundquist, by creating his public narrative, had effectively tried to lock his demons away from sight. At best, the experiment was only successful in creating a publicly recognized image. Jan Gottfarb, of the Lundquist Trust, believed that Lundquist also used his identification with the bourgeois as a type of armor in an attempt to keep "him from derailing emotionally." Björn Widegren had written an article about Lundquist and shortly after received a letter from the artist Roll Sörensen. Sörensen had known Lundquist well in the 1950s and 60s. He wrote that Lundquist could be a man of some extremes. Whether it was his appetite (Lundquist had once ordered a forty egg omelet, perhaps, in an attempt at bravado to impress his future wife Ebba.), his sadness, his drink or his joy, he seemed to have more than others. Humorously, Sörensen noted that by using so much impasto, Lundquist even made his canvases 'weigh" more than other artist's.

Torsten Anderson rejected this public persona as incomplete and said those things which did not fit into the image were "hushed up". Anderson had seen times when Lundquist's personality could undergo a change, and the calm would quickly become mania. His self-assuredness and inner belief would fall into disillusionment. His good-natured personality would become sarcastic, a trait which Torsten, in fact, preferred. The cozy personality was periodically derailed by moments of great depression, and his alcohol consumption was widely known among his inner circle of friends and fellow artists. Perhaps, this is an example of what some perceived as Lundquist being the "most ruthless toward himself." Even Lundquist's ordered and neatly arranged studio was in opposition to his true nature. Ulf Linde, while visiting Lundquist at his studio, had commented to Lundquist about the studio's organization. Lundquist, without a trace of whimsy, stated that it had to be that way because "I am a chaos." Others recalled his often solitary nature. Art history professor Katarina Wadstein Macleod, felt that Lundquist had incorporated the motif of loneliness into his work from very early on in his career. This is not to say Lundquist did not have friends, he did. He was often a warm, sensitive and friendly companion. However, this congeniality could change without much warning. Gottfarb noted that at times "the facade cracked" and Lundquist could behave with what could seem to be a limitless amount of unpleasantness. He believed that many of Lundquist's friends realized that Lundquist could have these moments, moments that would, today, likely be termed as a manic depressive state. Those that realized his swings in mood were linked to an inherent condition of his mind were understanding during these moments, those that did not understand his mental state criticized him for such moments.

However to the public, Lundquist was presented as the pipe-smoking, successful artist with a warm and agreeable personality. He was a comfortable well-dressed man; he actually disliked being photographed in any other manner. He was at times pictured with a jaunty hat perched on his head. His appearance in photographs made him look more like a university academic than an artist. His career and ability were presented as duly secured over time in a precise fashion. His work had made him into the respected patriarch of Swedish modern painting, and he sought to portray himself as living the comfortable bourgeois life which he had acquired by virtue of this work. Even in his autobiography, personal difficulties with depression are only fleetingly mentioned while "happier'" circumstances receive great detail. Lundquist was not seen as a man who was at times incapacitated by depression. Rather he was the man, who after a long day at his studio, could be found in town relaxing with friends at "The Golden Peace" or "The Opera Cellar". This was the image Lundquist wanted the public to accept as factual and indeed it was accepted as fact by the public. To the public and to much of the broader art world Lundquist was recognized as a bourgeois man, if not also a bourgeois artist.

=== Possible unintended consequence of edited persona ===
Lundquist desired to portray himself as the "bourgeois" warm and friendly painter may have also had unintended consequences within the broader world of modern art, as he sought to get his works recognized. Lundquist did, at least initially, endeavor to promote and garner recognition of his artwork. He sought to promote his artwork beyond the borders of Sweden by ensuring they were included in international exhibitions. He was successful in the effort, and his works reached Europe, North and South America and were recognized as major achievements. However, the art world of the 1950s was in a state of flux; it had been deeply transformed by the disasters produced by World War II. The center of art had left Paris, and New York had now become the nexus of the world of modern art. What was now exciting to art patrons, whether the style of art or the personality/image of the artist, was in a state of change. Mary Gabriel wrote in her book Ninth Street Woman about her belief that anyone could easily see that public interests in art had changed and that works of art prior to 1940 had lost their vogue. The works, and the style of the works, no longer could describe the psyche of the public after World War II. Gabriel writes that she understood and agreed with the words of poet Adrienne Rich who wrote of the period, "radical change in human sensibility required radical changes in artistic style". The world had changed and art was chaining with it. It would follow that the personalities of the artist would mimic the change.

In 1950, twenty seven artists signed a letter announcing their intention to boycott the exhibition "American Painting Today" at the Metropolitan Museum. Jackson Pollock, unavailable to sign, sent a telegram authorizing his agreement; thus twenty eight artists would come to affirm the letter. Among the twenty eight were: Willem de Kooning, Robert Motherwell, Mark Rothko, Adolph Gottlieb, Barnett Newman, Clyfford Still and Jackson Pollock; all who would go on to become iconic in the American Abstract Art Movement. A photographer for Life Magazine took a picture of fifteen of these artists and named them "The Irascibles", thus codifying their individualism into a common identity. The press portrayed them as tough, angry New York-based artists who were impoverished, hard-boiled and living in the cold water flats of New York, while fighting "the system" for recognition of their art. The "Irascibles" were the antithesis of the bourgeoisie, the personal motif that Lundquist identified with and promoted himself as representing. The image of the "Irascibles" contrasted greatly with the projected image of the agreeable-tempered Lundquist who painted in his Art Nouveau studio nestled in the tranquil park-lands of King Gustav's palace and there carefully put his finished masterful art into ornate golden frames.

It is not difficult to imagine that Lundquist's projections may have worked against him in the shifting values of what was now considered exciting in the personality, as distinct from the actual artwork, of artists in the postwar art world. Perhaps his portrayed persona supported a stereotype and bias that had previously existed which, at times, portrayed Swedish artists as somehow "too provincial". This stereotype was mentioned and complained about as late as 1959 by critic Clas Brunius. Lundquist had actually been confronted by such a biased perception. Fellow artist and friend Cliff Holden relates that he had requested Lawrence Alloway, who was then the head of London's Institute of Contemporary Art, to take on Lundquist. Alloway, familiar with Lundquist's reputation refused on the ground that he appeared as too "provincial". Eventually, Alloway did see Lundquist's artwork at a private exhibition at the Beaux Arts Gallery. Impressed, Alloway "profusely" apologized to Holden saying that "he now considered Lundquist was a major artist on the international scene." Fifteen years later, Alloway was to become curator at the Guggenheim in New York. The Guggenheim Museum, freshly housed in its iconic building designed by Frank Lloyd Wright, was already one of the most recognized museums in the world. Alloway's opinion of Lundquist as an artist had not changed, and he invited Lundquist to exhibit there.

== Withdrawal from broader art world ==
Ironically, Lawrence Alloway would also contribute, indirectly, to Lundquist removing himself from pursuing even more international recognition. While Lundquist may have inadvertently given his persona a less interesting "image", he would go on to make another direct choice which seems to have caused a greater long-term harm to his career. Alloway, in his role as curator of the Guggenheim Museum, had culled the world of art to select a small number of artists to be exhibited and to receive an award in the 1964 Guggenheim Foundation Exhibition. The President of the Guggenheim Foundation, Harry F. Guggenheim, explained the award was created to represent "preeminent national and international prestige". During this exhibition Lundquist was presented the award and was well received. However, he realized the extent to which "monetary interests largely controlled the art world." Uninterested in participating in such a dynamic, he returned to Sweden and continued to paint there for the remainder of his life.

Lundquist's decision appears to have been based on his own ethical considerations. His critical reviews would not have supported a decision for withdrawal. Fredrik Liew notes that Lundquist had been received "enthusiastically" by critics and that many museums were continuing to purchasing his works. Andrew Forge wrote of his British exhibition in 1960, "He is a mature and important artist and one whose stature will become increasingly important." The London Times had criticized British artists who were working in a similar style to Lundquist, calling them "apprentices" to Lundquist. Art critic R.V. Gindertael who, during Lundquist's 1960 Paris exhibition, wrote about the great number of artist's that appear in Paris attempting to achieve recognition; these artist show their work and are sent off into the "obscurity from which they emerged". Gindertael felt Lundquist was not similar to such artists, he did not need Paris to make his name; it was France that would gain by their association with works such as Lundquist's.

Coincidentally, Sweden's connection with artists and art of some other countries, particularly the United States, was facing strain during the 1960s. This strain, based on political and social differences, had begun at about the same time as Lundquist made his decision to withdraw from the world's art scene. The stress would continue into the 1970s, reaching its peak during the Vietnam War. The sentiment was exacerbated in the artistic community of Sweden by the unprecedented world-wide recognition and continued dominance of New York artists which heightened the ongoing tensions within Sweden's art community. Much of the recognition of the New York artists had come about due to the extraordinary and complex interactions between international museums, gallery owners and mass publicity afforded by modern media; New York based artists were the prime beneficiaries of this synergy. Turning the tables on claims of provincialism by those who had directed such criticisms against Swedish artists, artist Per Olof Ultvedt along with four other writers, published a letter criticizing efforts by a Swedish museum to acquire a "New York collection of art". Ultvedt claimed it was New York that was provincial, given its limits of geography and art content. Ultvedt, along with four other authors, would continue their criticism of "The New York collection" as being part of a collaboration between artists and engineers which, at least in the premise presented by the authors, represented "American military technology used in Vietnam". The net result of these sentiments, on the art community, might best be expressed by painter and curator Philip von Schantz who stated he was not interested in internationalism as a directive for museums. While not criticizing specific artists, he openly questioned the homogenization of both the art world and museum collections/exhibitions. Lundquist was leaving the art world and returning to Sweden, while leaders of Sweden's art community had begun a dialogue that would also lead to a retreat from some of the dynamics of the outside art world. Though their rationale was dissimilar, Lundquist and Schantz (and like-minded members of Sweden's art community) were building "walls" around themselves. For Lundquist the walls effectively served to prevent the egress of his artwork from Sweden. For Schantz, the walls were built to slow the ingress of homogenized "outside" art into Sweden.

In building these philosophical "walls", certain consequences, likely unintended, had also been created. In the withdrawal from the "international" and "homogenized" art world, Sweden had suffered. Critic Ludvig Rasmussen believed that Stockholm at the end of the sixties, "had lost its luster." Stockholm had steadily earned the descriptor of "provincial". For Rasmussen, by the 1980s some museums sat as nothing more than "stone-dead mausoleums". International artists, namely American artists, diminished significantly in Sweden during this period. Jeremy Lewison believed that Lundquist's decision not to continue to participate in the international art market also had a long term negative effect on his career. The artist, while keeping his values, had simultaneously deprived his career of the world's attention. Unlike his British counterparts, whose works were routinely pushed into the world markets (and world recognition) by the British Council, Lundquist in Sweden had no governmental/private equivalent to the British Council. Lundquist was primarily his own marketer. When he withdrew, there were few to "market" his work outside of Sweden. Lundquist was not forgotten; the artist was simply unavailable, except in Sweden.

== Concerns regarding economics and art ==
Lundquist's decision to withdraw himself from the broader art world was subjective. His observations regarding capital and its ability to influence the world of art conflicted with his individual values/ethics; it was a personal judgment Lundquist made for himself. Leaving his ethical concern(s) in abeyance, his observation that money exerts influence on the art world would generally be considered correct.

That economy has, and continues, to play a role in the dynamics of the art world is recognized. Money's interrelation and/or influence on art, indeed even the metrics of such, continues to be studied academically; the subject is a broad and lively one. To add context to the degrees of change since Lundquist's observations, and to establish how factual his concerns may have been, the researcher can look to the prices which art patrons were paying for the works of art created by recognized artists during the 1950s–1960s, as compared to prices currently paid. In the 1950s, Jackson Pollock's twenty two-inch square painting Number 16 was purchased for $306. A similar scale work (20 x 24-inch) by Lundquist was sold during the 1959 Beaux Arts Exhibition. The work titled The Pink Rock* was created circa 1959 and sold for £60 (US$110). Adjusting for inflation, that amount would be approximately £1,157.00 in 2020. Currently, the average price for a 'modern artwork' has been reported to be $27,600, with some sources reporting a high of $42,635. Capital investment into the art market continues to rise. During the period of 2000–2019, the contemporary art market had grown by 1,800%; including the year 2020 is expected to increase the figure to 2,100%. So called 'blue chip' artists, namely those who are heavily sought after and collected, have exceeded the S&P 500 by 250%.

* The Pink Rock was first exhibited during a Lundquist exhibition in Paris at the Galerie Rive Gauche in February 1960. Galerie Rive Gauche (1950–1970) had been established by collector and art historian Heinz Berggruen. The gallery had gained prominence in the 1950s when its director Rudolphe Augustinci and Berggruen had shown artists such as Max Ernst, Yves Tanguy and Rene Magritte. In the gallery's Lundquist catalogue, The Pink Rock appears along with eleven other paintings on an addendum page that was likely to have been added after the initial printing of the catalogue. The exhibition featured forty-two paintings, twenty-five of which were available for sale. The Pink Rock was next shown and purchased in London at the Beaux Arts Gallery during Lundquist's exhibition. This exhibition took place from 18 October – 16 November 1960. After purchase, The Pink Rock remained in the same private collection for 48 years until its sale at Christie's London on 5 June 2008. This work was later included in the 2010 Moderna Museet's Lundquist exhibition catalog, p. 135. It was then listed as being part of a private London-based collection.

== Dilemma of self-interpretation and the beginning of reinterpretation ==
Despite the acclaim Lundquist continued to receive in Sweden, leading to his recognition as a key figure in Swedish Modern Art, The Wall Street Journal reported in 2010 that Lundquist's legacy was confronting a dilemma: it was suffering from the public's rather "old fashioned" views of his work. These views had, at least partially, become firmly established by the strict interpretations put forth by Lundquist himself. Lundquist's own desire to determine how he and his works would be viewed may have contributed to the public's inability to recognize his work as forward-looking and innovative. The Wall Street Journal stated that the public did not recognize that Lundquist was "... capable of a spontaneity that recalls America's Jackson Pollock rather than Europe's Old Masters." The public's old-fashioned concepts, or more preciously how these concepts had evolved into the public's consciousness, may be easy to understand. Lundquist's contemporaneous critics, as well as art historians, had the task of classifying where Lundquist's art "stood". As with any developing artist, art critics may initially have varying interpretations of the artist's work. Methodology in developing an interpretation of art can vary, but would generally depend on the freedom to explore and exchange of ideas, which at times may be apart from the direct input of the works creator. Some interpretations may not be in complete agreement with the stated intention of the artist. With Lundquist, it may have been initially easier, and tempting, for contemporary critics to describe his work's by "intentionalism/intentism". Lundquist, as an established and respected artist, was directly describing to the causal viewer and to the scholar what his work meant and equally importantly what meaning(s) they did not have. However Lundquist's directives, if taken at face value by critics, may have limited valid speculation and critical assessment of the works. Simply put, Lundquist may have created a box into which he squarely put himself. With Lundquist's decision to withdraw from the outside art world, the box he had created was sealed. He had effectively prevented a dialogue about his artwork in the broader art world. In Sweden, those who knew him and knew of his personal desire to create his own narrative may have allowed him to do just that without much in depth review. Given Lundquist's stature within the tight knit world of Swedish art, open discussions about the deeper implications of his works and the man himself, discussions Lundquist would reject if they did not follow his narrative, would wait until after his death.

In 2010 the Moderna Museet created such an opportunity for discussion. In the words of curator Fredrik Liew "I hope that the exhibition will make room for several voices and for new experiences." Moderna Museet/Liew were able to tap into the wide opinions of diverse artists who have been influenced or moved by Lundquist's work. For Liew, the evolution of the exhibit, and examining Lundquist himself, was very much like removing the various layers of an onion peel. Both Lundquist and his art were free to be examined without a rigid preconception. Mr. Lundquist's statements concerning his art were respected but they were no longer completely binding. Free from the concreteness of Lundquist's narrative, his art and his own personality, were no longer limited to surface level appearances. Lundquist, in his own life, had surrounded himself within layers of his own inventions and/or identifications. In a sense his painting seemed to do the same; the many and multiple layers of paint built up over themselves, become a metaphor of his own personality.

When considering the style of Lundquist and what his art truthfully represents, the patron can now take notice of the concepts/conclusions that have been developed apart from Lundquist's statements regarding his work. Art critic and professor emeritus Terry Barrett claims that while it would be unwise to completely ignore an artist's statements about their art, it would also be equally unwise to be completely bound to them. Ironically, Lundquist a man who had created a layered and edited persona of himself to free himself from his "demons" and also wrote much about his feelings in relation to his life and art, had not shown any desire to apply psychology to interpret his work. It is easy to understand how an application of "Barrett's Principles of Interpretation" could have yielded significant and valid understandings. During the Retrospective, even the outer elements of Lundquist's artistic control were removed; the gold frames encasing the artwork, often put on by the artist himself as a further metaphor of the "bourgeois", were stripped away. The paintings, nearly bare, were displayed so that they were the focus and the emphasis. For art critic Peter Cornell, the retrospective had freed Lundquist from the "pompous" frames; his art was now able to be seen on its own terms. Lundquist was not simply a reclusive lonely artist but rather a full part "of the philosophy of his times". The exhibition had wiped the "dust" away; Lundquist and his art were evident and discernible again. Lundquist remains a key central figure in Swedish Modern Art.

As interesting as the reinterpretations can be, perhaps for the causal viewer the thoughts of Björn Widegren are most relevant. Describing Lundquist, Widegren "(saw) a painter standing next to his time ... without being ashamed of it." To Widegren, Lundquist may have painted lonely motifs but in his technique, using the heavy color enriched impasto, he allowed those "lonely" motifs to imbibe intensity and energy. Lundquist was able to forge his motifs into "the sublime, the iconic or most often just something that was magical."

== Personal life ==
Lundquist and Ebba Reutercrona married on 31 July 1943. From his marriage to Ebba, he had two children, Hübner "Hymme" Olof Alexis Lundquist and Emanuel "Manne" Lundquist. Lundquist, at various times, lived separately from his family and had limited to no physical contact with them. Particularly, in 1953 during his initial acquisition and residency of his thereafter permanent studio in Kanton, Drottningholm, it has been stated that Lundquist rarely had physical contact with his family who were living in Nacka. This is disputed by friend and neighbor Eva Ottoson who claims that Lundquist, while indeed living at his studio, also commuted back and forth a few times a week to see his wife and family. Today, using modern roadways, round trip travel time between his studio and his family would take about eight hours. Lundquist said that he considered his art and his wife Ebba to be the most important things in his life. He often wrote Ebba love letters on which he would make small drawings for her. Lundquist said that he wrote such letters on the last day of the month, a practice he continued "from our wedding to our death". In one such letter, Lundquist portrays himself as half Dr. Jekyll and half Mr. Hyde, with the explanation that one side represents him when he is painting, the other side when he is not. He playfully suggests that Ebba cover whichever side she does not want to see to see the side that she wishes to see.

In 1965 the Lundquist's son Hübner disappeared without a trace on the way to either the Gerlesborg Art School or to visit a nearby artist's collective in Lysekil (reported accounts vary as to his intended destination). He, like his father, experienced depression "and treated himself with a combination of Valium, psychotropic drugs and alcohol". Hübner's disappearance on July, 29, remains unsolved and may be connected to three other young men (Gay Karlsson, 22, Jan Olof Dahlsjö, 21, and Kjell Åke Johansson, 16), who, out for a drive in a borrowed blue Volvo PV 444, went missing on the same day. These disappearances remain the only unsolved case of a "mass disappearance" in Sweden. Further complicating the case, was the possibility that the disappearances may have been connected to the oddest bank robbery in Gothenburg's history. The theft, at the Scandinavian Bank at Gamlestadstorget, took place on the same day as the disappearances. The robbery, in which one of the male robbers dressed as a woman and wildly began to shoot into the crowd, led to a short lived escape attempt. The robbers, in wet suits which they had concealed under their clothing, attempt to escape into the Säveån River. One of the group, nicknamed "the brain" by the Swedish press, had accidentally shot himself in the leg which prevented his escape. After several hours underwater, "the Brain" emerged to the surface only to be arrested. His confession to the police led to the arrest of the other robbers. On the same day as the robbery and the other disappearances, a hitchhiking Hübner had mailed a postcard to his family from Gothenburg, it simply stated "All is well, don't worry." He then vanished without a trace. This has led to the speculation that all four disappearances may have had a connection to the violent robbery. There is also speculation that Hübner may have accepted a ride from the young men and suffered the same fate as they did. Friend Eva Ottoson believed both Lundquist and Reutercrona rejected the reality of the situation electing to believe, at least initially, that Hübner had not vanished but would return. The Lundquist family stated they believed that son Hübner my have left Sweden on his own for a life as a mariner. Some have come forward claiming to have met Hübner after his disappearance in 1965, however, these claims have never been proven. Lundquist, ever conscious of his public persona and reluctant to write about negativity, made one singular entry about his son's disappearance, "A great sorrow, but that is life after all. There are times of light, times of darkness, and of sorrow and of joy".

Evert Lundquist died on 4 November 1994, his ashes scattered according to his wishes.

In 1998, Ebba Reutercrona, the artist and wife of Lundquist, died in Drottningholm. She is buried alongside her son Manne at Lovö Church.

== Evert Lundquist Museum ==
Evert Lundquist's studio museum is located in the southern part of the Drottningholm Palace Park, southeast of the Chinese Pavilion. The whitewashed studio, with its Art Nouveau architecture and its large arched windows, was originally used to generate electric power to Drottningholm Palace at the beginning of the 1900s. In the 1950s, when the palace converted to the public supply, the building was available as a studio for Lundquist, who worked there from 1953 to 1990. In securing the location as his studio, Lundquist had the help of the Drottningholm Palace architect Ivar Tengbom. Lundquist had first been put in touch with Tengbom's wife, Margareta, by his childhood friend Henny Kyhlberger. Ivar Tengbom had then spoken to King Gustav VI and had asked permission for Lundquist to have access to the space. The King, having an interest in art, was well aware of Lundquist and allowed him to rent the property. At first he worked and lived alone in the studio, but in 1958 his family came to live in the house next door. After his death in 1994 the building, with its interior intact, was preserved as a museum, where everything remains as Lundquist left it in 1993. As well as oil paintings, charcoal drawings and drypoint engravings by the artist, oil paintings by his artist wife, Ebba Reutercrona (1911–1998), and watercolors by his son Manne, there is also a sculpture and painting of their missing son Hymme. The museum remains open during the pandemic, however it is suggested patrons call to ensure.

Lundquist's art studio was formally donated to the state to become a museum on 15 October 1987. To celebrate the event, the King of Sweden, Gustav VI and his wife the Crown Princess Margaret (the Crown Princess was, as her husband, an avid art patron who also painted and excelled at photography), paid a private visit to the studio. The King, clearly enjoying the visit, began to admire one of Lundquist's artworks on display. As it was evening the studio was not brightly lit, nonetheless the King stood alongside Lundquist admiring the painting Staffliet. The King remarked, "It shines so dramatically in the dim light." Lundquist's wife Ebba, however, was growing anxious about the length of the royal visit. Sensing this, Lundquist began to play "Eine kleine Nachtmusik" on a music box as a subtle hint that the night was drawing to a close. The King, either not realizing that he was being given a hint to depart or choosing to ignore it, continued to remain and enjoy his visit. Finally, a prior engagement forced the royals to take their leave. As the King left, he thanked Lundquist for the gift of the studio and promised to take care of it.
