= Yanira Collado =

American contemporary artist (born 1975)

- Born: 1975 (age 50–51); Brooklyn, New York
- Education: School of the Art Institute of Chicago
- Movement: Conceptual art
- Website: http://yaniracollado.net/

Yanira Collado (born 1975, Brooklyn, New York) is a conceptual artist working with found and man-made materials, such as discarded wood pieces and textiles, to convey ideas of identity, place, history, and labor as per her Caribbean heritage. Collado lives and works in Miami, Florida. She was a Visiting Artist-in-Residence at Virginia Tech in 2023, Virginia. She is the winner of the 2024 Florida Prize in Contemporary Art Award.

== Early life and education ==
Yanira Collado was born in Brooklyn, New York, in a family with Dominican Republic roots. She attended and graduated from the School of the Art Institute of Chicago (SAIC), Illinois, from 1994 and 1996. She is based in Miami.

== Work ==
Collado's multidisciplinary work expands on site specific installation, painting, drawing, sculpture, photography, and sound components to comment on collective and shared stories related to cultural preservation. Collado's work is inserted within a contemporary art historical discourse touching on post-Minimalist and Art Povera movements. Her work also focuses on African quilt-making cultural traditions and female labor.

"I am interested in concepts that allude to the restoration of things once muted due to the paradoxes in time. These perceptions are summoned through materials with inherent geographic histories, processes, and economies that imply varying degrees of personalized and public memory. My work attempts to assemble a visual language that reconciles the process in which the history of this information is recorded, stored, and retrieved."

Collado was a guest artist lecturer at Florida International University in 2019.

In 2023, she was the Artist-in-Residence at the Mississippi Museum of Art's Center for Art & Public Exchange (CAPE). The exhibition Zafa/ A Spellworking of Temporal Geometry was showcased at the Moss Arts Center at Virginia Polytechnic Institute and State University., in which she collaborated with students from the architecture department to create and install the works on view.

== Exhibitions (selection) ==
Collado created a site specific installation in the Miami arts space, Dimensions Variable, in 2020. She participated with two artworks in the El Museo del Barrio, New York, art triennial Estamos Bien in 2021.

She presented the installation Areito: Allusions of Sacred Geometry and Diaspora in 2022 at the Noyes Cultural Arts Center in Evaston, Illinois. The exhibition referenced the island of Quisqueya and Taíno culture. She presented Alchemic Chants / Reliquías Fragmentadas at Emerson Dorsch gallery in the Little Haiti neighborhood of Miami.

In 2023, Collado's work was presented at the University of Massachusetts Amherst. Co-curated by professor and artist Juana Valdes, the group show 'stitle, As We Move Forward, paid homage to the legacy of educator Augusta Savage and included South Florida talent, including filmmaker Monica Sorelle.

Her public art project at the Museum of Contemporary Art North Miami in 2024, connected the stories of the Gullah people and Yoruba spiritual beliefs to drawn on diasporic cultures in the United States and the Caribbean.

== Collections ==
Collado's work is featured in collections in museums in the United States and abroad. For example, her large-scale piece titled Untitled (sumando líneas) for Pecolia Warner, or Untitled (Adding up lines) for Pecolia Warner, made in 2019, is at the Pérez Art Museum Miami, Florida. The work references the travel of cultural memory through textiles, design, and crafts making that originated in the Democratic Republic of the Congo, Central Africa, and was brought up to Mississippi, United States.

Her work Penumbras #124 (2020), presented at the 2021 La Triennal: Estamos Bien, was acquired by the El Museo Del Barrio, New York.

== Awards ==
Collado is the recipient of the 2024 Florida Prize in Contemporary Art Award. The award and related exhibition is organized and hosted by the Orlando Museum of Art, Florida, annually. A cash prize of 20,000 USD is granted to each winner.

Collado is also the recipient of a Foundation for Contemporary Arts emergency grant (2022), a South Florida Cultural Consortium Fellowship (2021), the Ellis Creator Grant (2019), and the Joan Mitchell Foundation Painters & Sculptors Grant (2018). In 2013, her work was selected in first place at the 2013 South Florida Biennial.
