= Dahlsjö Case =

1965 mass disappearance case in Sweden

The Dahlsjö case
- Date: 29 July 1965
- Duration: Missing for 60 years, 10 months and 24 days
- Location: Gothenburg, Sweden; 57°41′52″N 11°57′10″E
- Theme: Disappearance
- Outcome: Unsolved cold case
- Missing: Kjell-Åke Johansson (aged 16 years); Hybner "Hymme" Lundqvist (aged 18 years); Jan Olof Dahlsjö (aged 21 years); Gay Roger Karlsson (aged 22 years)

The Dahlsjö Case (Swedish: Dahlsjöfallet) refers to the mass disappearance of Kjell-Åke Johansson (born 9 April 1949), Jan Olof Dahlsjö (born 8 June 1944) and Gay Roger Karlsson (born 25 March 1943) from a café in the city of Gothenburg, Sweden on 29 July 1965. The trio, who after being witnessed departing from the café in a midnight blue 1956 Volvo PV444 belonging to Dahlsjö, have never been seen since, even though various purported sightings of the trio were reported in August 1965 and 1966.

Additionally, Hübner Olof Alexis "Hymme" Lundqvist (born 6 February 1947), son of Evert Lundquist, was last verifiably reported alive after sending a postcard to his parents in Torekov from the Gothenburg Central Station on the same date as the trio disappeared. Although Lundqvist is commonly believed to have died whilst hitchhiking with the Dahlsjö trio, sightings of him in Adelaide, Australia in 1966 and Singapore in 1968 have been reported.

In addition, a robbery at a bank in Gamlestaden, Gothenburg also occurred on 29 July 1965. The peculiar escape plan by the robbers, which included escaping in a river by using wetsuits, made mass media dub the crime "Grodmansrånet" (the Frogman Robbery). It is unclear whether the robbers were directly involved in the disappearance of the four men, though the Swedish Police have since discredited this theory.

== Disappearances ==
=== Dahlsjö trio ===
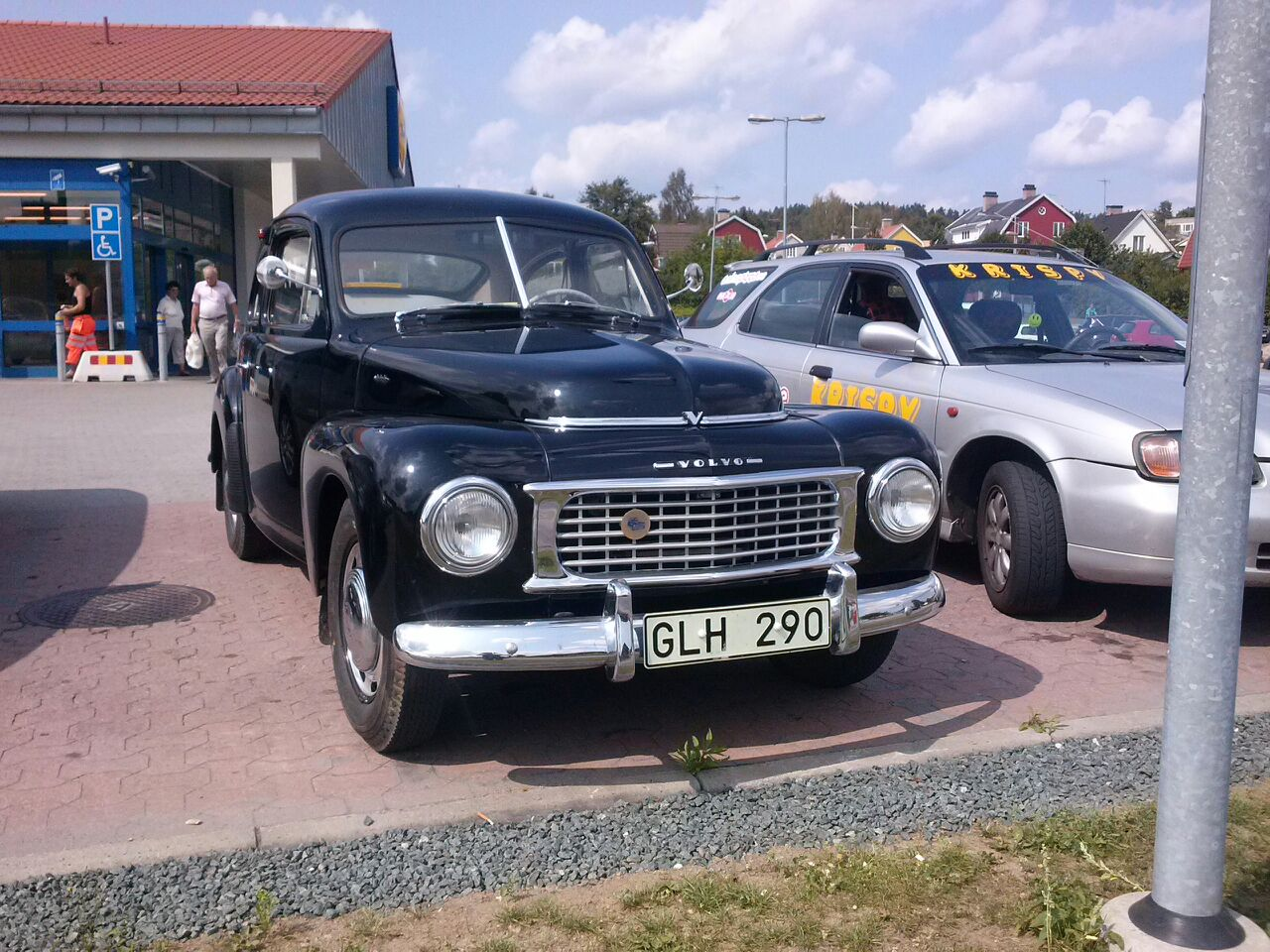
Johansson, Dahlsjö and Karlsson were last seen travelling in Dahlsjö's 1956 Volvo PV444.

What Johansson, Dahlsjö and Karlsson did in the days immediately before their disappearance has not been thoroughly established. Dahlsjö's mother Ingrid states that Dahlsjö left his home for the last time on the morning of 28 July 1965, dressed in a brown suit, light blue socks and black shoes. Before leaving the apartment, he had told his mother that he was going camping and swimming with friends in Åsa, Kungsbacka. At roughly 2:00 am of 29 July, Dahlsjö and Karlsson visited a mutual friend in the suburb of Olskroken to bid their farewells to him. Dahlsjö's activities between roughly 2:00 am and 2:00 pm on that day are largely undocumented, as he never returned home to his mother.

Karlsson arrived at the Swedish Public Employment Service's office at Värmlandsgatan in Masthugget at roughly 6:30 am on 29 July, staying there until he and a group of other men went out to smoke at 8:00 am. (Note: This incident has also been attributed as having occurred on 28 July 1965.) A driver of a red truck offered Karlsson temporary work for the rest of the morning and most of the noon. On the morning of 29 July, Johansson left his family's apartment, leaving behind his work shoes in the hallway which baffled his mother, as Johansson generally was punctual. Johansson brought roughly 100 kronor (equivalent to 1226 kronor in 2024) with him. As with Dahlsjö, Johansson also informed his mother that he would be going camping in Åsa. Johansson did not turn up at work that day, nor is it clear what he did as a substitute to working on that day. Johansson's sister last sighted her brother a few days before 29 July, walking down Mellangatan towards Frigångsgatan in Haga.

The trio congregated at Café Mården in Haga at some point shortly after noon on 29 July, though it is unknown what they ordered there. At about 3:00 pm, Johansson, Karlsson and Dahlsjö left the café, entered Dahlsjö's midnight blue Volvo PV444, with Karlsson in the driver's seat, and drove off. This is the last confirmed sighting of the trio. (Note: Older sources often cite the trio's last sighting as having drove out of a back alley on Risåsgatan in Annedal during that morning, something later corrected in newer sources.)

=== Hübner "Hymme" Lundqvist ===
For most of July 1965, Lundqvist had spent his time with his family at their summer cottage in the coastal Scanian town of Torekov. However, Lundqvist felt restless and somewhat uncomfortable staying with his overprotective parents, and had read about an art colony in Lysekil which he wanted to visit during his vacation. Lundqvist left the summer home during the afternoon on 29 July 1965. It is unclear when he departed; some sources state it was around 3:00 pm (at the same time as the Dahlsjö trio), though others state he left later. It is also unclear how Lundqvist made his way to Gothenburg; some sources claims he hitchhiked all the way there from Torekov, others claim that he made it to Båstad, where he bought a train ticket to Gothenburg Central Station. According to his mother, Lundqvist was dressed in a brown suede leather jacket, a white cotton shirt, grey polyester pants and a dark blue sweatshirt. He did not bring his passport and had roughly 100 kronor (equivalent to 1226 kronor in 2024) with him.

Regardless if he hitchhiked or took the train, Lundqvist arrived at Gothenburg Central Station at roughly 8:00 pm on 29 July. The final confirmed sighting of Lundqvist came in the form of a postcard, which he had mailed to his family in Torekov from Gothenburg Central. The postcard included references that he was planning on hitchhiking the rest of the way to Lysekil, alongside a plea for his parents not to worry about him.

== See also ==
- List of people who disappeared mysteriously: 1910–1990
