= Xaviera Simmons =

American contemporary artist (born 1974)

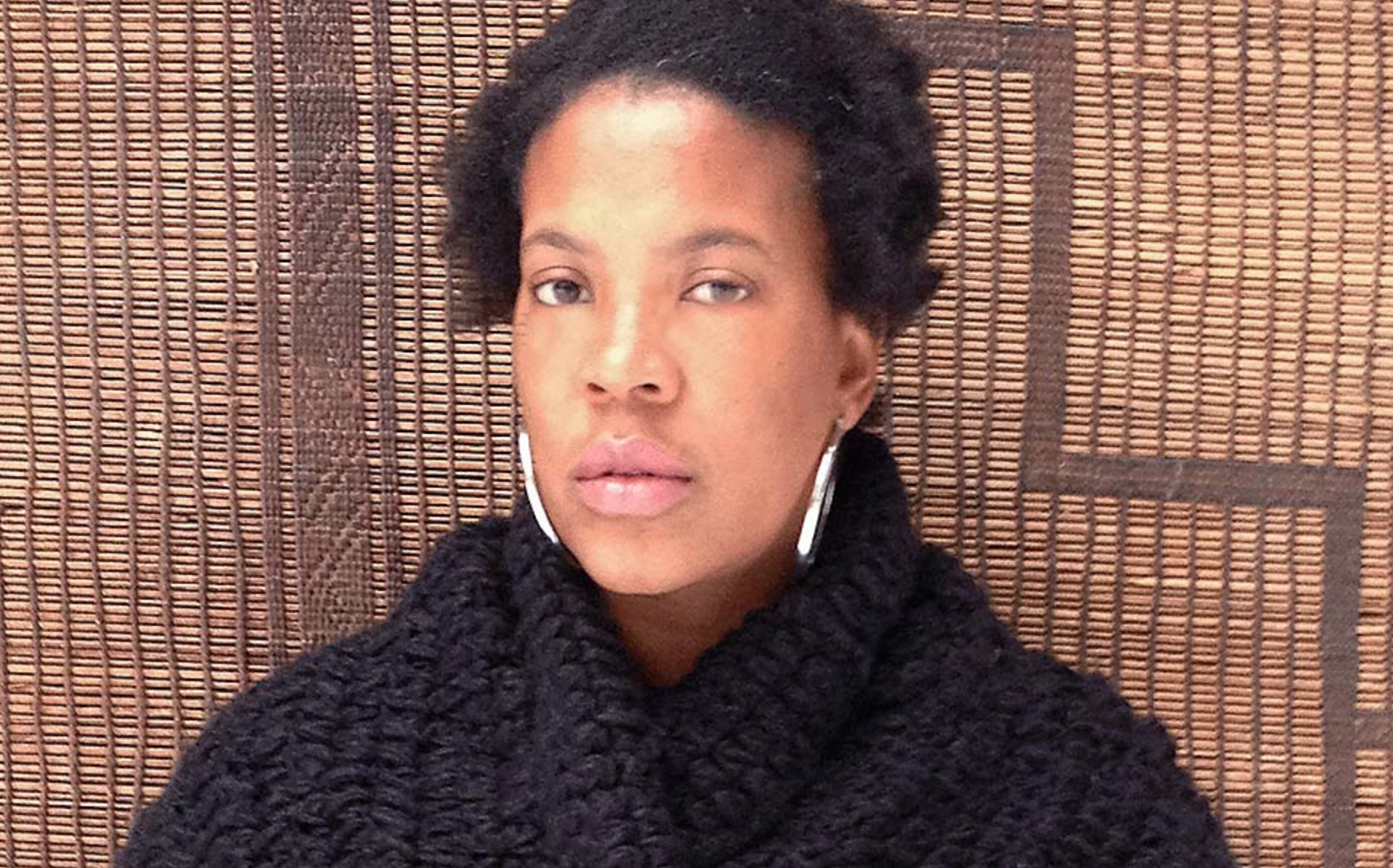
- Artist Xaviera Simmons
- Born: 1974 (age 51–52); New York, New York
- Education: Bard College
- Known for: Photography; Conceptual art Painting; Sculpture; Performance; Installation art
- Movement: Contemporary Art Conceptual Art
- Awards: The Charles Flint Kellogg Award in Arts and Letters from Bard College, Socrates Sculpture Park Artist Award, Agnes Gund’s Art for Justice Award, Denniston Hills’ Distinguished Performance Artist Award, Louis Comfort Tiffany Memorial Foundation Award, David C. Driskell Prize
- Patrons: Agnes Gund

Xaviera Simmons is an American contemporary artist. She works in photography, performance, painting, video, sound art, sculpture, and installation. Considered a public intellectual, she is known for works which span formal artistic practices as well as conceptual and political landscapes.

According to Simmons gallerist, "she defines her studio practice, which is rooted in an ongoing investigation of experience, memory, abstraction, present and future histories-specifically shifting notions surrounding landscape-as cyclical rather than linear. In other words, Simmons is committed equally to the examination of different artistic modes and processes; for example, she may dedicate part of a year to photography, another part to performance, and other parts to installation, video, and sound works-keeping her practice in constant and consistent rotation, shift, and engagement."

== Personal life and education ==
Simmons was raised in New York City to a practicing Buddhist parent in an extremely creative and matriarchal atmosphere. Simmons has mentioned many times in lectures the unique mixture of being raised by Buddhists while also attending various denominations of the Black Church. Simmons traveled frequently to Bangor, Maine as a child and this mixture of New York City and rural Maine have formed many of the ideas inside of her work. Simmons has stated in her lectures and writings that she is a descendant of Black American enslaved persons, European colonizers and Indigenous persons through the institution of chattel slavery on both sides of her family's lineage.

Simmons received her BFA from Bard College in 2004, studying under An-My Lê, Larry Fink, Mitch Epstein, Lucy Sante and Stephen Shore. She completed the Whitney Museum of American Art’s Independent Study Program in Studio Art in 2005, while simultaneously completing a two-year actor-training conservatory with The Maggie Flanigan Studio.

Simmons has held teaching positions at Harvard University, Yale University and Columbia University.

Simmons has shown consistently with David Castillo Gallery since 2010.

Simmons was awarded the 2008 David C. Driskell Prize from the High Museum of Art.

== Artwork ==
Simmons has exhibited works nationally and internationally. Her work has been shown at the Museum of Modern Art (New York), MoMA PS1 (Long Island City, New York), Museum of Contemporary Art, Chicago, Studio Museum in Harlem (New York), Contemporary Arts Museum Houston, Walker Art Center (Minneapolis), the Pérez Art Museum Miami, and the Institute of Contemporary Art, Boston. In 2017, Simmons had a solo exhibition of her work at the Radcliffe Institute for Advanced Study at Harvard University.

The 2008 Public Art Fund's program for emerging artists commissioned Simmons to produce a three-week project. The project, Bronx as Studio, used the streets of the Bronx as a space for sidewalk games, classic photographic portraiture, and performance art. Passersby were encouraged to participate in various activities including hopscotch, soapbox speaking, chess, and Double Dutch. Simmons provided props and background elements, against which all of the publics' spontaneous activities were recorded. Color portraits were sent directly back to participants, as a way of completing the process of active, creative participation.

In 2010 The Nasher Museum of Art at Duke University commissioned Simmons to produce a full length record album inspired by the landscape and histories of North Carolina. Simmons produced a set of photographic images and sent them to musician friends who subsequently wrote music to her images. From this work Simmons album "Thundersnow Road" was released in 2010 via Merge Records. Musicians on the album include: Jim James of My Morning Jacket, Harrison Haynes of Les Savy Fav, Mac McCaughan of Superchunk, and Tunde Adebimpe, Jaleel Bunton and Kyp Malone of TV on the Radio.

She participated in the Artists Experiment series at the Museum of Modern Art in 2013. Simmons acted as both artist and archivist, tracing the museum's own history while extracting and reinstating examples of political action through gesture.

Coded was a survey exhibition at The Kitchen in 2016. In relation to it, Simmons also created a performance work using archival materials and resources to explore queer history, homoeroticism, and Jamaican dancehall culture.

In 2018, Simmons made a public art installation on Hunter's Point South Park on the East River in Queens, New York. The installation, Convene, consisted of inverted canoes painted in the colors of the national flags of some immigrant populations in the area.

In 2019, Simmon wrote an opinion piece for The Art Newspaper, with the title "Whiteness must undo itself to make way for the truly radical turn in contemporary culture." She also pulled out as a panelist at IdeasCity Bronx, a New Museum festival, when local Bronx organizers shut it down with their concerns.

In 2021, Simmon's work was featured in Polyphonic: Celebrating PAMM's Fund for African American Art, a group show at Pérez Art Museum Miami highlighting artists in the museum collection acquired through the PAMM Fund for African American Art, an initiative created in 2013. Along with Xaviera Simmons, among the exhibiting artists were Faith Ringgold, Tschabalala Self, Romare Bearden, Juana Valdez, Edward Clark, Kevin Beasley, and others.

Simmons initiated an ongoing project entitled Reading Work (www.readingworkstudio.com) which engaged hundreds of individuals and collectives from across the United States in compensated reading and art-making. The project was funded by the Ford Foundation's Art for Justice grant. Simmons has stated that this project is non-linear and ongoing.

The Queens Museum commissioned a site specific solo exhibition in 2022 from Simmons. The title, "Crisis Makes a Book Club," comes from a conversation between Simmons and the artist Michael Rakowitz. The project was critically acclaimed with multiple reviews in the New York Times.

After the show’s closing Simmons, who is an ardent supporter of artists rights, pushed back against The Queens Museum, the show’s host for violating her intellectual property by repurposing and adapting her large scale work "Align" for a separate unrelated exhibition without the artist's permission.

In 2025 Simmons photographed her long time friend Tunde Adebimpe for his album "Thee Black Boltz". Adebimpe previously recorded a song on Simmons' record, Thundersnow Road which is also the name of her studio.

== Permanent Public Art Commissions ==
- 2025: Marshall L. Davis Sr. African Heritage Cultural Arts Center, Miami-Dade County

== Museum Acquisitions ==
Simmons' work is held in the following collections, among others:

- Agnes Gund Art Collection
- De la Cruz Collection, Miami, Florida
- Deutsche Bank, New York
- High Museum of Art, Atlanta
- Institute of Contemporary Art, Boston, Massachusetts
- Institute of Contemporary Art, Miami, Florida
- Museum of Contemporary Art, Chicago, Illinois
- Museum of Contemporary Art, North Miami, Florida
- Museum of Modern Art, New York
- Nasher Museum of Art at Duke University, North Carolina
- Pérez Art Museum Miami, Florida
- Rubell Museum, Miami, Florida
- Sarasota Art Museum, Sarasota, Florida
- Soho House collection, New York City, Rome, DC
- Solomon R. Guggenheim Museum, New York
- Studio Museum in Harlem, New York
- UBS Art Collection, New York
- Weatherspoon Art Museum, North Carolina

== Board Appointments ==
Simmons has served on boards including:

- Printed Matter, Inc.
- Spaceworks

Spaceworks was a not-for-profit organization developed by the New York City Department of Cultural Affairs to help artists with affordable work space. The program provided performers with low cost hourly rehearsal space and visual artists with affordable studio space on an annual lease.

Simmons has acted as an artist advisor for The Foundation for Contemporary Arts.
