= Rico Gatson =

American artist (born 1966)

- Born: 1966 (age 59–60); Augusta, Georgia, U.S.
- Other name: Aunrico Gatson
- Education: Bethel University (BFA), Yale School of Art (MFA)
- Awards: The Louis Comfort Tiffany Foundation (2001)
- Website: ricogatson.com

Rico Gatson (born 1966) is an American multidisciplinary artist, working in Brooklyn, New York. His work draws from his African-American background. Through his art, he provides social commentary on significant moments in African-American history. His work combines abstract patterns with vibrant colors, which creates confrontational work that references African American culture and history.

== Early life and education ==
Rico Gatson was born in Augusta, Georgia in 1966, and grew up in Riverside, California. His parents, a nurse and a landscaper contractor, migrated to the East Coast during the Great Migration and joined the newly formed Black middle class.

In the 1980s, he attended Bethel University in Minnesota as an undergraduate. He changed his degree from graphic design to fine art and received his Bachelor's of Fine Arts (BFA) degree in 1989. He received his Master of Fine Arts (MFA) degree from Yale School of Art in 1991. During his time at school, he studied sculpture under artist David von Schlegell.

He has held artist residencies at Franconia Sculpture Park, and at the Wright Museum of Art of Beloit College in Beloit, Wisconsin.

== Art career ==
Gatson's art practice explores themes of African American History and identity. His abstract works offer loaded symbols and images that spark dialogue regarding the U.S. political landscape, especially as it relates to Black life and Black icons. His art is influenced by the early twentieth-century geometric compositions of Russian Constructivist propaganda posters, whose creators believed that art should reflect the everyday lives of the people. Reimagining the Black figure's place in history, the present, and the future, Gatson's work also evokes Afrofuturism. He draws upon a range of art historical movements, including Bauhaus and Op art, as well as traditional African textile patterns.

An interdisciplinary artist, Gatson works with many different mediums such as painting, sculpture, photography, video, and installations. He often incorporates kaleidoscopic motifs into his videos and portraits of Black heroes, as in his portraits of James Baldwin, Martin Luther King Jr., the Black Panthers, Muhammad Ali, and President Obama.

His work has been exhibited nationally and internationally at locations like The Smithsonian American Art Museum, The Mississippi Museum of Art, Atlanta Contemporary Art Center, Studio Museum in Harlem in New York, and The Essl Museum in Austria.

Beacons

In 2019, Gatson created a series of mosaic portraits for the Bronx Subway Station. Beacons, was exhibited in 167 St. Station, and the eight portraits celebrated iconic African-American and Latino figures; those who were depicted included Tito Puente, Justice Sonia Sotomayor, Audre Lorde, Celia Cruz, James Baldwin, Reggie Jackson, Maya Angelou, and Gil Scott-Heron. Beacons is an extension of his first New York museum solo, Icons.

The geometric lines that primarily use the Pan-African colors, red, green, and black allude to beams of light, emphasizing the beauty and pride that is associated with the cultural figures. The colors used in the mosaics are also common in many of Gatson's other paintings such as those seen in When She Speaks. His panels paintings also incorporate the aforementioned colors to reference African culture as a whole.

When She Speaks

Gatson's 2014 solo exhibition, When She Speaks, included photo collage, sculpture, and video. The focus of the exhibition was a short video that played footage of Black Panthers members Kathleen and Eldridge Cleaver responding to the injustice of their son, Bobby Hutton's death. Colorful kaleidoscopic edits were included in order to fragment and overlap the imagery, resulting in an unnerving atmosphere. Similar instances of such video effects can be seen in his solo show, The Promise of Light, 2013.

== Exhibitions ==
=== Solo exhibitions ===
- Ronald Feldman Gallery, New York, NY My Eyes Have Seen, 2018
- Studio Museum in Harlem, New York, NY, Icons, 2017
- Studio 10, Brooklyn, New York, Rico Gatson: When She Speaks, 2014
- Ronald Feldman Fine Arts, New York, NY, The Promise of Light, 2013
- Ronald Feldman Fine Arts, New York, NY, Dark Matter, 2009
- Cheekwood Museum of Art, Nashville, TN, African Fractals, 2006
- Ronald Feldman Fine Arts, New York, NY, African Fractals, 2006
- Ronald Feldman Fine Arts, New York, NY, History Lessons; Clandestine, 2004
- Franklin Art Works, Minneapolis, MN, Rico Gatson: Recent Works, 2003
- Atlanta Contemporary Art Center, Atlanta, GA, Masking: Rico Gatson (Kindred) And Andres Serrano (Klansman), 2002
- Ronald Feldman Fine Arts, New York, NY, Rico Gatson, 2001
- Ronald Feldman Fine Arts, New York, NY, Rico Fire, 2000
- Pierogi 2000, Brooklyn, NY, Home Sweet Home, 1999

=== Group exhibitions ===
- Essl Museum, Vienna, Austria, New, New York, 2013
- Tang Teaching Museum, Skidmore College, Saratoga Springs, New York, The Jewel Thief, 2011
- Cynthia Broan Gallery, New York City, New York, System Failure, 2007
- Santa Monica Museum of Art, Santa Monica, California, Black Belt, December 11, 2005,
- Studio Museum in Harlem, New York City, New York, Black Belt, 2004
- Brooklyn Museum of Art, Brooklyn, New York City, Current Undercurrent:Working in Brooklyn, 1998

== Awards ==
- Pew Charitable Trust, Graduate Fellowship, 1990
- Oil Bar Ltd. Award for Excellence in Sculpture from Yale School of Art, New Haven, Connecticut, 1991
- Prized Pieces Video Award from the National Black Programming Consortium, Columbus, Ohio, 1991
- Louis Comfort Tiffany Foundation, Biennial Award for Visual Artists, 2001
