= Sigrid Sandström =

Swedish painter and lecturer (born 1970)

- Born: 1970 (age 55–56); Stockholm, Sweden
- Occupation: Artist

Sigrid Sandström (born 1970) is a Swedish artist and a professor of Painting at the Academy of Fine Arts in Helsinki. Her work is characterized by graphic abstraction, an embrace of color and difference in scale, and an array of techniques used to apply paint and other materials to canvas, ranging from cloths and rugs, to masking with tape, squeegee-ing and smearing, and collaging. She has also worked in film and video, most notably for her 2005 exhibition Her Black Flags at the Mills College Art Museum in Oakland, CA, and in sculpture and installation. Artforum critic Naomi Fry, reviewing a 2007 show at Edward Thorp Gallery, cited the artist's interest in landscape as subject and noted that Sandström "also grapples here with painting’s essential difficulty in the face of the sublime. As the works consistently teeter on the verge of abstraction, the interplay between a more traditional naturalism and geometric fragmentation provides a salient tension."

== Early life and education ==
Sandström was born in Stockholm, Sweden. She earned a bachelor's degree in fine art from Academie Minerva in the Netherlands in 1997 and spent a year studying at The Cooper Union in New York City on an exchange program. In 2001, she graduated with a master's in fine art from the Yale School of Art. She attended Skowhegan School of Painting and Sculpture in Maine in 2000 (later returning as faculty in 2014) and attended the Core Residency Program at Museum of Fine Arts in Houston, Texas (2001–03).

== Work ==
Sigrid Sandström's work has been shown at a number of museums internationally, including Moderna Museet in Stockholm; The Nationalmuseum in Stockholm; the Mills College Art Museum in Oakland, CA; the Contemporary Art Museum Houston and the Museum of Fine Arts, Houston, TX. In 2006, she had a one-person exhibition at the Frye Art Museum in Seattle, WA and in 2018 Sandström had a one-person exhibition at Västerås konstmuseum, Sweden. In 2019 she had a survey one-person exhibition at Konstens hus in Luleå, Sweden. She has also exhibited work with Anat Ebgi, Los Angeles, CA; Inman Gallery in Houston, TX; Edward Thorp Gallery, New York; and Galleri Gunnar Olsson and Cecilia Hillström Gallery in Stockholm, Sweden.

Sandström's first solo show in Los Angeles, "Other Places" , was hosted in 2016 by Anat Ebgi Gallery . Her second show with the gallery, Figure Ground took place in 2021, and was covered by the publication, Artland . Sandström's third and most recent solo exhibition in Los Angeles, "Janus" , took place in the summer of 2023.

Sigrid Sandström is the editor of the publication Material Matters: Painting and Its Materialities, 2020, Art & Theory & Royal Institute of Art, Stockholm. She is the co-editor, with Gavin Morrison, of Ignorance: Between Knowing and Not Knowing (Axl Books, 2015), an anthology which aims to differentiate ignorance from "not knowing" and to determine the philosophical role of ignorance in the development and reception of artworks. Along with artists Kristina Bength and Jan Rydén and curator Jonatan Habib Engqvist, she produced Studio Talks: Thinking Through Painting (Arvinius+Orfeus Publishing, 2014), a book documenting discussions and studio visits linking the practice of painting with the theoretical framework that undergirds it. She also published Grey Hope: The Persistence of Melancholy (Atopia Projects, 2006), which was awarded a grant from the Barbro Osher Foundation. In 2016 the monograph "The Site of Painting" was published on Sandström's work (Art & Theory, 2016).

Sigrid Sandström is a Professor of Painting at the Academy of Fine Arts / Uniarts, Helsinki and has previously held teaching positions at the Royal Institute of Art, Stockholm, Bard College, NY; MassArt, Boston, MA

.

== Recognition and awards ==
Sandström is a recipient of a Guggenheim Fellowship and a Joan Mitchell Foundation Painters and Sculptors Grant.
