= Juana Valdes =

Cuban-American artist (born 1963)

Juana Valdés
- Born: 1963 (age 62–63); Cabañas, Pinar Del Rio, Cuba
- Education: Parsons School of Design (B.F.A.); School of Visual Arts (M.F.A.)
- Occupation: Multi-disciplinary artist
- Website: JuanaMValdes.com

Juana Valdés (born 1963) is a multi-disciplinary artist and an associate professor at the University of Massachusetts Amherst. Her works examine Afro-Cuban migration through the lens of material culture and personal experience. Valdés's work in ceramics, printmaking, video, and installation explores the colonial and imperial economies that tie the transoceanic movement of people and political ideologies across Asia, Africa, Europe, and the Americas. Her installations and photographs of mass-produced decorative objects chart the history of colonial trade in conversation with her sub-Saharan and East Asian ancestry, demonstrating that the ancestry of black and brown populations is inextricably linked to trade and globalization. Valdés works with a wide range of source material that reflects the impact of global networks of exchange on contemporary issues of transcultural identity, displacement and migration, and the climate crisis.

== Biography ==
Valdés was born in Cabañas, Pinar Del Rio, Cuba, in 1963. She migrated to Miami, United States, with her mother, brother and sister in 1971; her father arrived a year later. Her work is, in part, informed by this early experience of migration, her childhood memories of Cuba, and adjusting to life in the United States.

== Education ==
She received her B.F.A. in Sculpture from the Parsons School of Design in 1991 and her M.F.A. in Fine Arts from the School of Visual Arts in 1993. She attended the Skowhegan School of Painting & Sculpture in 1995, after receiving a Cosby Fellowship from the Skowhegan School of Painting & Sculpture, in Maine, United States.

== Academic career ==
Valdés's career as an academic started in 1996 when she was invited by Bard College to teach Studio Art and exhibit a site-specific installation in the Fisher Arts Building, where Judy Pfaff and William Tucker were co-chairs the department.

From 2002 to 2005, Valdés participated in the Artist-Teacher MFA program in the Visual Arts Department at Vermont College of Norwich University. During that time, Valdés led a Digital Screen Print Workshop in the Yale School of Art at Yale University in 2004. Starting in 2005, Valdés taught sculpture as an adjunct professor in the College of Arts and Letters Art and Technology program at the Stevens Institute of Technology. Between 2005 and 2010 Valdés taught Studio Art at Brooklyn College, City University of New York (CUNY), before joining the faculty at Florida Atlantic University as an assistant professor of Printmaking in the Department of Visual Arts and Art History from 2010 to 2015. In 2015, Valdés was an associate professor of Printmaking in the Department of Art in the College of Humanities and Fine Arts at the University of Massachusetts Amherst, where she was awarded tenure.

== Artistic practice and critical reception ==
Juana Valdés was one of the first Black artist in residence at Art Center/South Florida, later rebranded to Oolite Arts. Valdés's was a resident for one year (1989), studio was located at 1661 Michigan Avenue.

Valdés's work has been exhibited in over 100 museums and galleries nationally and internationally, including spaces such as El Museo del Barrio, Whitebox Gallery, and P.S. 1 Contemporary Art Center.

Her work is held in museums and private collections throughout the United States, including the Smithsonian National Museum of African American History and Culture, Newark Museum of Art, and the Pérez Art Museum Miami.

Her work has been favorably reviewed in journals such as Art in America, Frieze, Latinx Spaces, Miami Herald, Berlin Art Link, Santa Fe New Mexican, South Florida Sun-Sentinel, Newcity Art, El Nuevo Herald, The New Tropic.

Valdés's work is also the subject of several scholarly publications including Bending Bone China: Juana Valdes’ Politics of the Skin by Josune Urbistondo (2015) and Latinx Art: Artists/Markets/Politics by Arlene Dávila.

== Awards ==
Juana Valdés has received several awards from the Skowhegan School of Painting and Sculpture in 1995, the National Association of Latino Arts and Cultures Fund for the Arts grant in 2016, the Pollock-Krasner Foundation, Cuban Artist Fund, New York Foundation for the Arts, Netherland-America Foundation, Faculty Research Mentoring Program, Lifelong Learning Society, Oolite Arts Ellies Award, Joan Mitchell Foundation, and Anonymous Was A Woman Award, among others.

== Publications ==
Her work can be found in many books including Women and Migration: Responses in Art and History, Relational Undercurrents: Contemporary Art of the Caribbean Archipelago, Four Generations: The Joyner Giuffrida Collection of Abstract Art, Much Wider Than a Line, and Multiplicity: Contemporary Ceramic Sculpture.

== Series of work ==
=== Rest Ashore ===
With Rest Ashore (2020) at Locust Projects, Valdés incorporated video into her practice for the first time. The multimedia installation explores how the refugee crisis has been documented and disseminated in mass media throughout the years, both past and present.

The exhibition also featured Waves of Migration: a multimedia sculpture of CRT televisions facing opposite each other, each screen depicting different decades of Cuban migration—the 1960s, 1970s, 1980s, and 1990s—through archival footage to tell the story of each wave of migration. The project continues Valdés's thematic exploration of bodies of water, which have always played a significant role in her practice and the way she perceives and reimagines the Caribbean.

Throughout her career, Valdés has reexamined her personal experience of migration and how it relates to the current global refugee crisis. According to Valdés, “My recent work focuses on migration because I see it as one of the most significant issues of the 21st century. 79.5 million people were forcibly displaced worldwide at the end of 2019. I recently heard on the news that Venezuela would soon replace Syria with the largest number of displaced people. And it is not just countries in war or political conflict. The future will bring climate change refugees, as it already happened with hurricane Katrina.”

=== Terrestrial Bodies ===
Terrestrial Bodies (2019) resulted from a multi-year process of collecting mass-produced collectible porcelain objects from around the world. Working with the language of anthropology and archeology, Valdés demonstrates how the legacy of colonization is entrenched in institutions, social structures, and, most importantly, in objects. A timeline of her mother's ancestry, compiled by the genetic testing service 23andMe, roots my family heritage at a crossroads between Africa, Asia, and the Americas, revealing how the ancestry of black and brown populations is inextricably linked to trade and globalization.

=== Colored Bone China Rags ===
Valdés created the Colored Rag series by adding skin-toned powder pigments in the clay prior to firing, thereby manipulating its chemical composition and changing its color. The intention is to question the mythology of whiteness as pure relative to notions of Mestizaje in the Caribbean, and link bodies to the physical constitution of bone china and its extraction and displacement as a raw material and commercial good. The Colored Bone China Rags also create visual analogs between rags used by cleaning women, the suppleness of a woman's body, and the range of skin tones in ethnically mixed communities. Subsequently, arranged, the work presents the myth of post-racial America as an increasingly far-fetched utopia.

== Solo exhibitions ==
List of solo exhibitions
Year	Title	Place
2023	Juana Valdés: Embodied Memories, Ancestral Histories	Sarasota Art Museum, Sarasota, FL
2020	Rest Ashore	Locust Projects, Miami, FL
2019-20	Terrestrial Bodies	Miami Dade College Special Collection, Cuban Legacy Gallery, Miami, FL
2019	Round 49: penumbras: sacred geometries, 'terrestrial bodies: roteiro,'	Project Row Houses, Houston TX
2017	The Colored Bone China	Herter Gallery, University of Massachusetts, Amherst, MA
2015	An Inherent View of the World	Mindy Solomon Gallery, Miami, FL
2015	From Island to Ocean: Caribbean and Pacific Dialogues	Center for Cultural Analysis at Rutgers, Rutgers University, New Brunswick, NJ.
2015	Mettre Noir Sur Blanc	Guttenberg Arts, Guttenberg, NJ.
2014	Remnants- “What Remains	Thomas Hunter Project Space, Hunter College, CUNY, NY.
2013	SENSEI Exchange Series @ “The Cellar” of Little Fox Café, Part 008	In The Fold, NY.
2009	Past/Present Tense — Tiempos del Subjuntivo	Jamaica Center for Arts & Learning, NY.
2006	Looking Back 1994 – 2004	paul sharpe contemporary art, New York, NY.
2006	The Land that time forgot	Diaspora Vibe Gallery, Miami, FL.
2002	Juana Valdes/Pedro Velez	Bronx River Art Center, Bronx, NY.
2000	Haarlem/Harlem-Transported Illusions	Begane Grond Kunstcentrum, Utrecht, Netherlands.
2000	Empty Space	The Avram Gallery, Southampton College-Long Island Unv. Southampton, NY.
1998	YUCA	Miami Dade Community College, Inter-American Gallery, Miami, FL.
1997	Sweet Honesty- Tender Pink	Phoenix Gallery Project Room, NY.
