= Nels Smith =

Nels Smith may refer to:

- Nels H. Smith (1884–1976), American politician, governor of Wyoming
- Nels J. Smith (born 1939), his grandson, American politician in Wyoming
