= 1942 Wyoming gubernatorial election =

- November 3, 1942
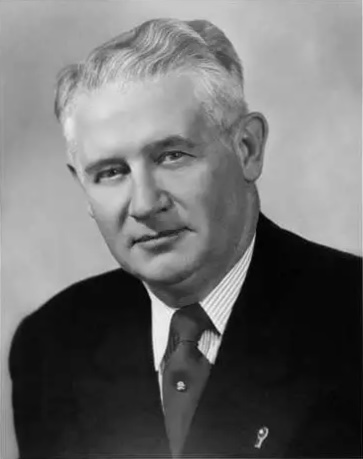

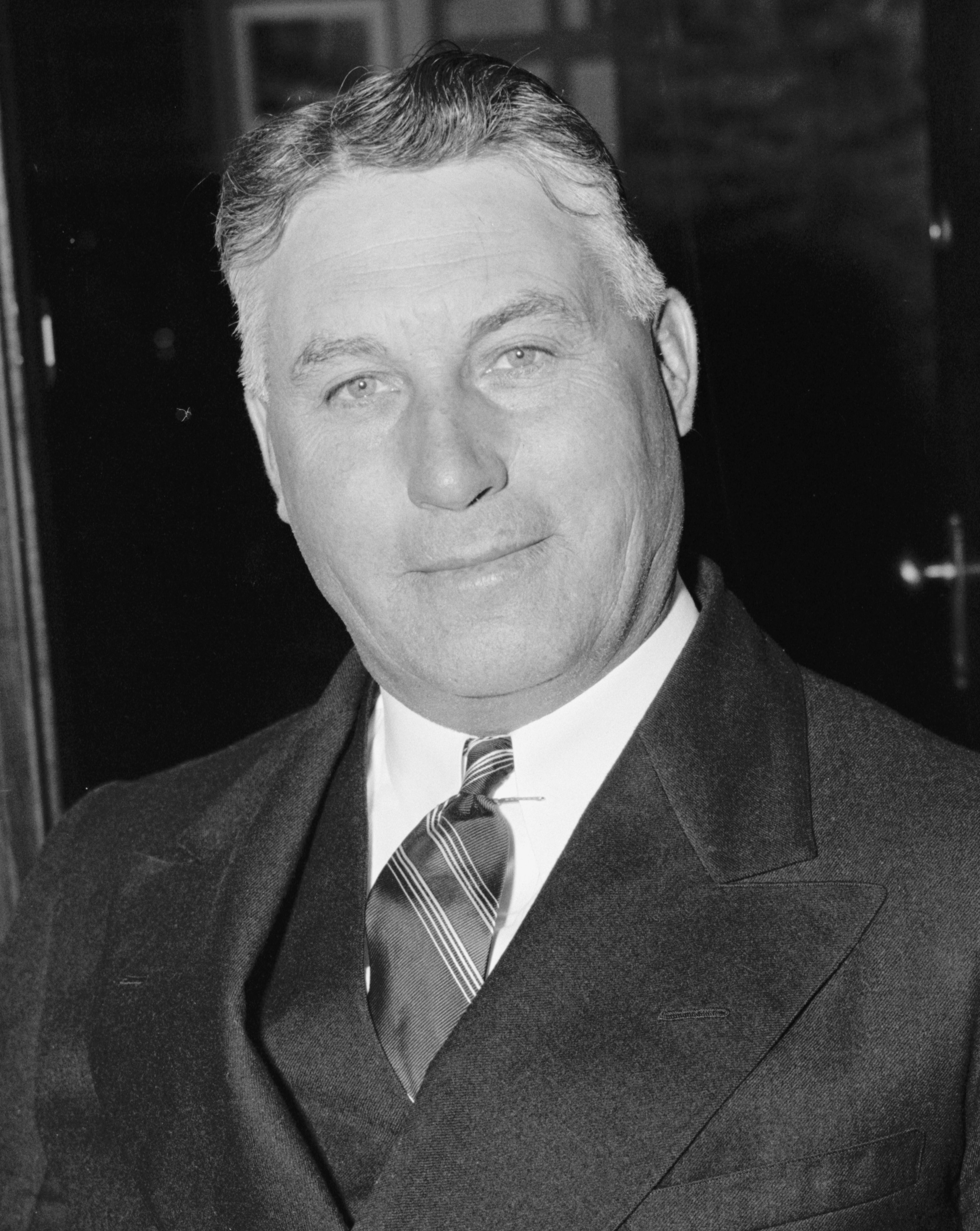
Nominee	Lester C. Hunt	Nels H. Smith
Party	Democratic	Republican
Popular vote	39,599	37,568
Percentage	51.32%	48.68%
- County results Hunt: 50–60% 60–70% Smith: 50–60% 60–70%
Governor before election
Nels H. Smith
Republican
Elected Governor
Lester C. Hunt
Democratic

The 1942 Wyoming gubernatorial election took place on November 3, 1942. Incumbent Republican Governor Nels H. Smith ran for a second term as governor. After defeating several opponents in the Republican primary, he advanced to the general election, where he was opposed by Lester C. Hunt, the Wyoming Secretary of State and the Democratic nominee. In a reversal from Smith's landslide election in 1938, Hunt narrowly defeated him in his attempt at a second term.

== Democratic primary ==
=== Candidates ===
- Lester C. Hunt, Secretary of State of Wyoming
- Gus Engelking, rancher, 1938 Democratic candidate for Governor

Democratic primary results
Party	Candidate	Votes	%
Democratic	Lester C. Hunt	20,255	92.56%
Democratic	Gus Engelking	1,628	7.44%
Total votes		21,883	100.00%

== Republican primary ==
=== Candidates ===
- Nels H. Smith, incumbent Governor
- Frank Cowan, former Mayor of Casper
- John F. Raper, Sheridan attorney, 1938 Republican candidate for Governor

Republican primary results
Party	Candidate	Votes	%
Republican	Nels H. Smith (inc.)	20,580	71.41%
Republican	Frank Cowan	5,220	18.11%
Republican	John F. Raper	3,019	10.48%
Total votes		28,819	100.00%

== Results ==
1942 Wyoming gubernatorial election
Party	Candidate	Votes	%	±%
Democratic	Lester C. Hunt	39,599	51.32%	+11.12%
Republican	Nels H. Smith (inc.)	37,568	48.68%	−11.12%
Majority		2,031	2.63%	−16.98%
Turnout		77,167		
Democratic gain from Republican				
