= Disappearance of Connie Smith =

1952 missing child case in the United States

Connie Smith
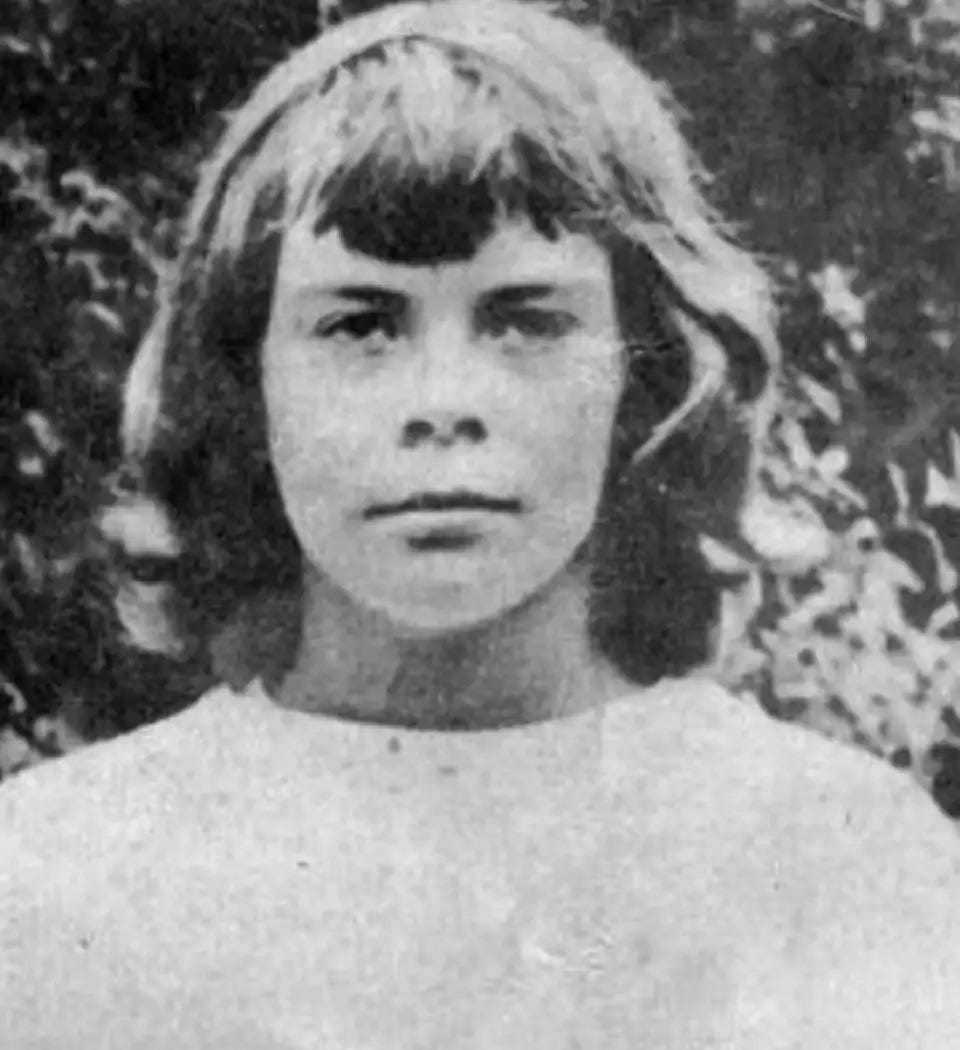
- Connie Smith in July 1952
- Born: Constance Christine Smith; July 11, 1942; Sundance, Wyoming, U.S.
- Disappeared: July 16, 1952 (aged 10); Lakeville, Connecticut, U.S. 41.9645°N 73.4408°W
- Status: Missing for 73 years, 11 months and 21 days
- Known for: Missing person
- Height: 5 ft 0 in (1.52 m) (approximate)
- Parents: Peter Franklin Smith; Helen Smith (née Jensen)
- Family: Nels J. Smith (brother); Nels H. Smith (paternal grandfather)
- Distinguishing features: Caucasian female. Weight 80 pounds (36 kg). Light brown hair, blue eyes, a slight scar under her right nostril. Last seen wearing a red windbreaker, a brown bandana halter top, navy blue shorts with plaid cuffs, tan leather shoes, and a red ribbon in her hair. She was nearsighted and unable to read without her glasses, which were broken at the time of her disappearance.

Constance Christine "Connie" Smith (born July 11, 1942 – disappeared July 16, 1952) was a 10-year-old American girl who disappeared after she ran away from a YMCA-operated summer camp in Lakeville, Connecticut, on July 16, 1952, and was last seen hitchhiking. Her disappearance remains unsolved.

== Circumstances of disappearance ==
Connie Smith was a camper at Camp Sloane, a summer camp near Lakeville, Connecticut, a census-designated place within the town of Salisbury, Connecticut, in Litchfield County, Connecticut, United States. She ran away after she had an apparent altercation with other campers who may have been bullying her on the morning of July 16, 1952. She was last seen attempting to hitchhike a ride at the intersection of U.S. Route 44 and Belgo Road, near Salisbury.

== Family background ==
Her parents, wealthy Sundance, Wyoming rancher Peter Franklin Smith and his former wife, Helen Jensen Smith, divorced in 1949. They lived on neighboring Wyoming ranches. Connie lived primarily with her mother, but also spent a great deal of time with her father, who had remarried in 1950.

Peter Smith was an American of Danish descent, the son of former Wyoming Governor Nels H. Smith and his wife, Marie Christensen Smith. Helen Smith's wealthy parents, Carl Christian and Ester Jensen, immigrated to the United States from Denmark and Sweden. Helen Jensen Smith was raised in Greenwich, Connecticut, where she and Peter Franklin Smith were married in 1937. Connie and her older brother, Wyoming state politician Nels J. Smith, were baptized in the Wyoming Governor's Mansion.

== Characteristics ==
Connie grew up on her family's Wyoming ranch and loved animals, especially horses, horseback riding and spending time outdoors. She invented stories about a pet white mare, Toni, that could twirl a baton and a pet rattlesnake. She enjoyed reading comic books.

She was described as an intelligent, imaginative child who usually related well to other children and adults. She had traveled extensively with her wealthy family, which enabled her to converse with adults on subjects with which her peers had no experience.

== Time at Camp Sloane ==
Helen Smith enrolled Connie at the YMCA camp for a month in July 1952 while Helen visited her parents in Greenwich. Connie had been at the camp for nearly two weeks and was expected to remain at the camp for two more weeks when her mother and maternal grandparents visited her to celebrate her birthday on the weekend before her disappearance.

Connie appeared in good spirits during their visit. Her mother deposited five dollars ($60.62 in 2025) into Connie's account at the camp, which she could use to purchase treats. Connie asked permission to stay at the camp longer than had been originally planned. Connie told her mother that she was excited about her plans to attend a square dance with the boys at the camp on the following Friday and to compete in a dressage event at a horse show that was to be held the following Saturday. Her mother refused permission to extend Connie's stay at the camp because she had already made travel arrangements for their return to Wyoming. Connie did not seem bothered by her mother's refusal to let her remain longer at the camp.

Connie might not always have been happy at the camp. She did not smile for a group photo that was taken with her tent mates at the camp a week before she disappeared. Earlier photos of Connie showed a happy child with a bright smile. Connie seemed homesick after she spoke with her mother, and was unhappy on the morning of July 16. She slipped and fell down the steps that led to her tent platform the previous evening and bruised her hip. A nurse at the camp dispensary gave Connie an ice pack to apply to her injured hip during the night. She felt better in the morning and said she no longer needed the ice pack. However, according to one report, one of her tent mates accidentally kicked Connie in the face and bloodied her nose that morning when the other girl climbed down from her upper bunk bed. A police report stated that Connie was injured during "horseplay" with several other girls. Her eyeglasses might have been broken during one of these incidents.

== Timeline of disappearance ==
Connie applied the ice pack to her bleeding nose after the incident. She told her tent mates at 7:50 a.m. on Wednesday, July 16, that she planned to return the ice pack to the camp dispensary. Instead, Connie left the ice pack in the tent she shared with seven other girls and walked one-half mile (0.80 km) down the dirt road that led to the camp entrance. Although Connie had been taught to walk downhill or follow a fence or road if she found herself in an unfamiliar location, she was extremely near-sighted and could not see well without her glasses, which had been broken at the camp.

The camp's gatekeeper, whose house was nearby, drove by Connie. He told police he saw Connie walk out of the gate at 8:15 a.m. and stop along the roadside to pick wildflowers. He thought she was one of the camp counselors and did not stop the car.

Connie was 5 feet (1.5 m) tall and weighed 85 pounds (39 kg). She had unusually long arms and flat feet. She was wearing a red windbreaker, a brown bandana halter top, navy blue shorts with plaid cuffs, and tan leather shoes. Her clothing had attached name tags. Her shoulder-length, light brown hair was pulled back with a red ribbon. She had blue eyes. She was extremely suntanned. Her eyeteeth were erupting. She was possibly carrying a small black zippered purse that contained photographs of her friends. She had no money with her, since campers were not allowed access to cash.

Like the camp's gatekeeper, others who saw her that morning also thought Connie was older than she really was, because she was tall and well-developed. According to a police report, Connie stopped at two nearby homes to ask for directions to Lakeville. One of the witnesses said Connie looked like she had been crying, but the woman did not offer to help her.

Connie was last seen at 8:45 a.m. on July 16. She was seen hitchhiking at the intersection of U.S. Route 44 and Belgo Road, located about 1.4 miles (2.3 km) from the entrance to the camp. Some have speculated that Connie was trying to go to Lakeville to place a telephone call to her mother and was reluctant to do so at the camp where she would have been overheard by camp staff. She never reached Lakeville.

Her tent mates told an adult that Connie was missing from the tent when they returned from breakfast. The camp was searched but Connie was not found. The camp director did not report her missing to police until 11:30 a.m., more than three hours after her disappearance. The camp director might have delayed making an official report because he hoped to avoid negative publicity.

== Search efforts ==
Connie's family connections attracted considerable media attention to her disappearance. Every reported sighting was investigated, but proved unfounded. In the weeks after she was reported missing, Connecticut State Police searched for the missing child along mountain trails, in woodlands, around reservoirs and lakes, and in swamps in the area. Searches were conducted on foot and on horseback, in motor vehicles and by air.

Connie's father personally joined the search party and returned to the state to search for his missing daughter. Some people who met the tall rancher in Connecticut compared Connie's father to the Marlboro Man, the handsome, rugged cowboy used in advertising campaigns for Marlboro cigarettes. The family did their best to continue bringing attention to Connie's disappearance.

Eleven thousand missing person flyers with multiple photographs and a physical description of Connie were printed and distributed throughout the United States. Connie's dental chart was printed in the Journal of the American Dental Association to aid dentists across the country in identifying her through dental records if human remains were found. Despite these extensive search efforts and an ongoing police investigation, her disappearance has never been solved.

== Theories ==
There have been many theories about what might have happened to Connie Smith, ranging from accidental death to abduction to murder. Investigators initially considered whether one of her divorced parents might have abducted her to gain leverage in a child custody battle, but they quickly ruled out both parents as suspects. Her parents continued to hope that Connie was still alive.

=== Accidental death ===
Investigators speculated that Connie might have been struck by a car as she walked along the roadway and the driver might have concealed her body or put the dead or injured child in his car and driven away. This was considered unlikely since no blood was found along the route. There were also no other signs of a hit and run car accident detected.

Others speculated that Connie might have suffered a concussion when she fell down the steps leading to her tent platform the previous evening that caused amnesia or an even more serious brain injury. Connie was not examined by a doctor after the fall. While Connie might have gotten lost in the woods and died of an injury or drowned in a body of water, investigators searched extensively and found no body or clothing or any other items that belonged to Connie in the area.

=== Unknown serial killer ===
Disappearance locations of Welden (Bennington in 1946), Hull (Lebanon Springs in 1936), and Smith (Lakeville in 1952)

A Connecticut State Police investigator on the case said it was most likely that Connie, who was seen hitchhiking, was picked up by an opportunistic killer along Route 44, murdered, and buried or dumped into one of the water-filled iron quarries in the area. The investigator thought it unlikely that the killer would ever be identified.

Other females had disappeared under similar circumstances within the New England region during the same era and there has been speculation that all three might have been victims of an unidentified serial killer. In addition to Smith:

- Katherine Hull, aged 22, vanished from Lebanon Springs, New York, on April 2, 1936. She went for a walk and did not return. She may have been hitchhiking, per some contemporary reports. Remains found by a hunting party more than seven years later, in December 1943, near the New York state border in Hancock, Massachusetts, close to where Hull disappeared, were tentatively identified as hers.
- Paula Jean Welden, a 5-foot-3-inch (1.60 m), 125-pound (57 kg) blue-eyed blonde 18-year-old college sophomore at Bennington College in North Bennington, Vermont, vanished on December 1, 1946, while hitchhiking to the Long Trail a few miles from the campus and has never been found.

Lebanon Springs, New York, is located 40 miles (64 km) south of Bennington, Vermont, and 46 miles (74 km) north of Lakeville, Connecticut. Since Connie Smith appeared to be older than she actually was, one author speculated that she might have been a victim of a serial killer with a preference for young women in their late teens, such as Welden, or early twenties, such as Hull.

=== Frederick Pope ===
A 27-year-old traveling jewelry salesman named Frederick Walker Pope told police in 1953 that he, a companion named Jack Walker, and a Rhode Island woman, Wilma Sames, picked Connie up along U.S. Route 44 and offered to give her a ride to Wyoming. They drove to Oklahoma, where Sames left the party, and continued on to Arizona. Connie reportedly told Pope that her father was a "real big man." Peter Smith was 6 feet 7 inches (2.01 m) tall. Connie began arguing with Walker over which direction to go. Pope said he got out and walked away. Walker strangled Connie to death and Pope helped Walker bury her in a shallow grave near a construction site off U.S. Route 60 between Show Low, Arizona, and Carrizo, Arizona. Pope claimed he beat Walker to death with a tire iron when they argued as they changed a flat tire and dumped him in a ravine. Pope then abandoned the car and hitchhiked to New Mexico.

Pope later recanted the story, which he said he invented after seeing an episode of a television program, Art Linkletter's House Party, on September 1, 1952. Peter Smith was a guest on the program and discussed his missing daughter. Pope told authorities he wanted to be taken into state custody so he could receive treatment for his alcohol addiction. Pope could not give an accurate physical description of Connie. Authorities also found no record of Walker or Sames, and there were discrepancies between Pope's work record and his claim that he picked up Connie Smith near Salisbury on July 16, 1952. Pope had registered to find work in Indianapolis, Indiana, on July 15, 1952. He also had a history of mental illness.

=== Little Miss X ===
The unclothed body of a Caucasian or Hispanic teenage girl between the ages of 11 and 17 years old was found on October 31, 1958, on a hillside off a dirt road on Skinner Ridge south of Grand Canyon National Park. The remains were thought to have been there for nine to fourteen months. No cause of death could be determined, but foul play was suspected.

The unidentified victim was 5 feet (1.52 m) to 5 feet 3 inches (1.60 m) tall, had wavy and reddish brown hair that had been dyed a lighter brown. Her teeth had been well-cared for and she had seven dental fillings. Clothing found nearby was too large for her. Also found nearby was a jar of Pond's Cold Cream, a powder puff containing remnants of suntan-colored powder, a blue plastic nail file with the initials "PR", and a white nylon comb.

Authorities nicknamed the girl "Little Miss X". The body was exhumed in 1962 and then reburied. Authorities no longer have an exact record of precisely where "Little Miss X" was reburied, though they suspect she was reburied somewhere in the Citizens Cemetery. Connie's family dentist noted many similarities between the teeth of "Little Miss X" and Connie Smith. In 2018, a set of remains was exhumed from the cemetery and compared against the DNA of Connie's older brother, but the recovered remains did not match the Smith DNA profile. The remains might not have been those of "Little Miss X".

=== William Henry Redmond ===
Another theory is that Connie was a victim of suspected serial killer and child molester William Henry Redmond, who is also a suspect in the August 24, 1951, disappearance in Cleveland, Ohio of 10-year-old Beverly Potts. Authorities could not establish whether Redmond was in Connecticut on July 16, 1952. Redmond denied that he killed Connie and passed a polygraph test.

== See also ==
- List of people who disappeared mysteriously (1910–1970)
