= Murder of Maria Ridulph =

American murder victim

Coordinates: 41°59′13″N 88°41′44″W

Maria Ridulph
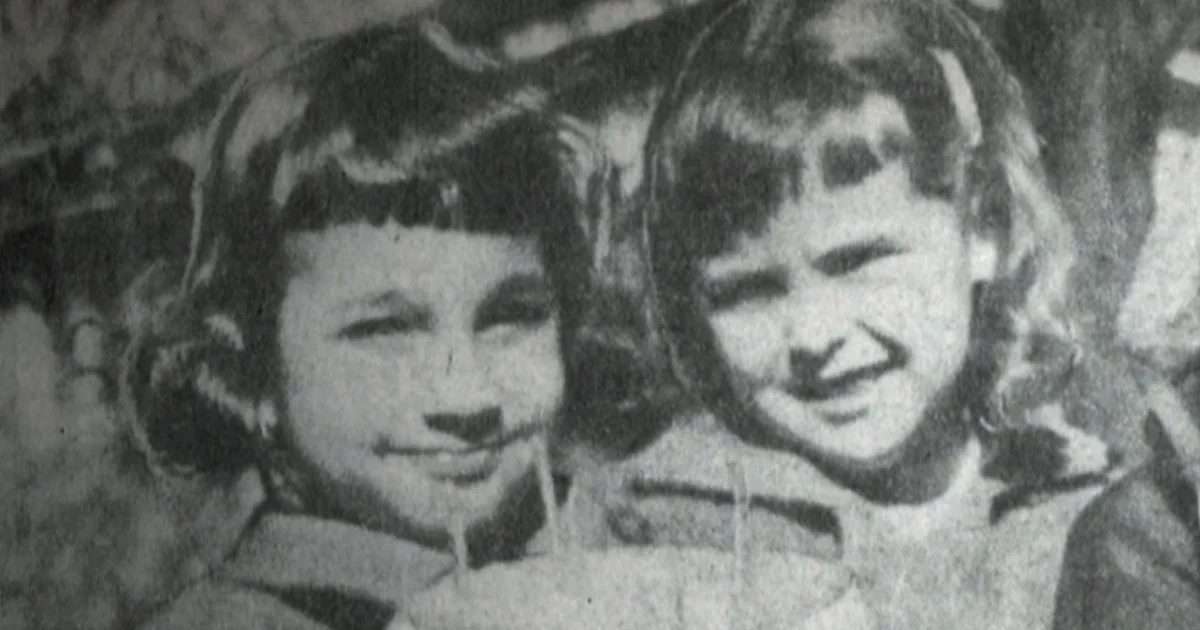
- Ridulph (left) with Kathy Sigman in 1957.
- Born: Maria Elizabeth Ridulph; March 12, 1950; Sycamore, Illinois, U.S.
- Disappeared: December 3, 1957 (aged 7); Sycamore, Illinois, U.S.
- Body discovered: April 26, 1958; Woodbine, Illinois, U.S.
- Parents: Michael Ridulph (father); Frances Ivy Ridulph (mother)

Maria Elizabeth Ridulph (March 12, 1950 – c. December 1957) was a seven-year-old girl who disappeared from Sycamore, Illinois, United States, on December 3, 1957. Her remains were found almost five months later in a wooded area near Woodbine, Illinois, approximately 90 miles (140 km) from her home. Maria was last seen by her friend on her neighborhood corner of Center Cross Street and Archie Place with an unknown man in his early twenties who called himself "Johnny".

The case, which was well known in the Chicago area, was one of the oldest cold case murders in the U.S. that was thought to have been solved. Jack McCullough, who under his former name John Tessier had been a neighbor of the Ridulph family, was wrongfully convicted of her murder in September 2012. McCullough was serving a life sentence when the DeKalb County State's Attorney completed a post-conviction review in March 2016. In particular, phone records from Illinois Bell showed that McCullough made a collect call to his mother from a payphone forty miles away in downtown Rockford, Illinois rather than from Sycamore as alleged at his trial, leading the State's Attorney to conclude McCullough could not have been in Sycamore at the time of Maria's abduction. McCullough was released from prison in April 2016 and declared innocent by the DeKalb County Circuit Court in April 2017.

== Background ==
Maria Ridulph was born on March 12, 1950, to Michael and Frances Ivy Ridulph in Sycamore, Illinois. She was the youngest of four children and had two sisters and a brother. Although many residents lived or worked on farms in the area, her father Michael worked at one of Sycamore's few factories and her mother Frances was a homemaker. At the time she was abducted, Maria was 7 years old, 44 inches tall, and weighed 53 pounds, with brown hair and brown eyes. She was an honor student in second grade. She also received awards for perfect Sunday school attendance at Evangelical Lutheran Church of St. John.

According to her mother, Maria was high-strung. "My daughter was a nervous girl and if she got in any trouble would become hysterical," Frances said in a 1957 interview shortly after Maria disappeared. "Someone would probably have to kill her to keep her quiet. I am the only one who could calm her down." Maria was also described as a "screamer" and afraid of the dark. Her best friend was 8-year-old Kathy Sigman, who lived on the same street as the Ridulphs.

== Crime ==
On the evening of December 3, 1957, Maria begged to be allowed to go outside as it had started to snow. After finishing dinner, Maria and Kathy Sigman went outside in the dark near Maria's house and played a game they called "duck the cars", running back and forth trying to avoid the headlights of oncoming cars in the street. According to Kathy, they were approached by a man, whom Kathy later described to police as in his early 20s and tall with a slender chin, light hair, and a gap in his teeth, and wearing a colorful sweater. The man, who said his name was "Johnny", told the girls that he was 24 and not married. He asked if they liked dolls and if they liked piggyback rides. He gave Maria a piggyback ride, after which she went back to her house and got a doll to show him. After Maria returned, Kathy ran back to her house to get her mittens, leaving Maria alone with the man. When Kathy returned, Maria and the man were gone.

Kathy went to the Ridulph house to tell them she couldn't find Maria. The family initially thought Maria was hiding, and sent Maria's 11-year-old brother to look for her. After he was unable to find her, the Ridulphs called the police, and within an hour, police and armed civilians began a search of the town, but failed to locate Maria or "Johnny", the man with whom she was last seen. The Federal Bureau of Investigation (FBI), presuming that Maria might have been abducted across state lines, arrived in Sycamore within two days to help the local and state police in the search. The FBI and police interviewed numerous witnesses who had seen the two girls playing without any other person present between 6:00 – 6:30 p.m., and also spoke to family members who had seen or spoken with Maria and Kathy in the course of Maria getting her doll, Kathy getting her mittens, and Kathy reporting Maria's disappearance to the Ridulphs. Based on these interviews, "Johnny" was thought to have approached the girls after 6:30 p.m., and the FBI concluded that Maria was abducted between 6:45 – 7:00 p.m.

Kathy Sigman was the only witness who had seen "Johnny" and was placed in protective custody, as the police and FBI feared that the kidnapper would come back and harm her. The authorities had her look at photos of convicted felons or suspects who bore a resemblance to "Johnny". John Tessier, who was wrongfully convicted of the crime over 50 years later, lived in the girls' neighborhood and was on the original list of suspects based on a tip, but the police did not ask Kathy to identify him after he provided an alibi for the night of the crime. In late December 1957, Kathy was taken to the Dane County Sheriff's Office in Madison, Wisconsin, to see a lineup of possible suspects. She positively identified Thomas Joseph Rivard, described in FBI documents as a 35-year-old man approximately 5 foot 4 inches tall and 156 lbs., with dark blond wavy (bushy) hair. However, Rivard had an alibi, as he was in jail at the time of the kidnapping; police suspected someone else in the lineup as the real culprit and Rivard was merely used to fill out the lineup. Rivard also did not physically resemble Tessier, who was six inches taller and 17 years younger than Rivard. (Note: The "People's Answer to Defendant's Pro Se Petition" filed in People v. McCullough on March 24, 2016, states that Tessier was 12 years younger than Rivard, which appears to be an error as sources support Tessier being age 18 at the time of the lineup.) When asked years later about the 1957 lineup, Kathy said she did not remember picking Rivard out of the lineup.

Maria's disappearance received national news coverage, and both President Dwight D. Eisenhower and FBI Director J. Edgar Hoover took an interest in the case. Law enforcement continued to investigate various suspects in the area, including transients, known sex offenders, and a local man who had given children piggyback rides, but developed no solid leads. Maria's parents appeared on television and in other media pleading for their daughter's safe return and the public's help in finding her.

On April 26, 1958, near Woodbine, Illinois, two tourists searching for mushrooms in a wooded area along US Route 20 discovered the skeletal remains of a small child, wearing only a shirt, undershirt, and socks, under a partially fallen tree. The decomposed condition of the body indicated it had been there for several months. The body was identified as Maria Ridulph based on dental records, a lock of hair, and the shirts and socks she had been wearing when she disappeared. The rest of Maria's clothing, including her coat, slacks, shoes and an undergarment, was not found. No photographs were taken of the crime scene because the coroner, James Furlong, did not want photos of the child's body leaked to newspapers. Because the crime had occurred within Illinois rather than crossing state lines, the FBI withdrew from the case, leaving it to state and local police.

The initial autopsy did not determine a cause of death due to the state of decomposition. During an autopsy done 50 years later, a forensic anthropologist determined Maria had likely been stabbed several times in the throat.

== Suspects ==
=== John Tessier (Jack McCullough) ===
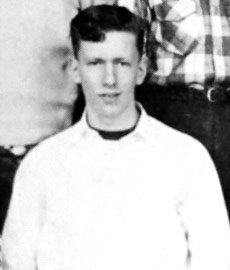
John Tessier in high school c. 1955; at the time he lived with his family near the Ridulph home.

John Tessier was born John Cherry on November 27, 1939, in Belfast, Northern Ireland, to British sergeant Samuel Cherry and his wife Eileen McCullough Cherry. Samuel Cherry was killed early in World War II. During the war, Eileen Cherry served as one of the first female airplane spotters with the UK's Royal Air Force and met Ralph Tessier, who was serving with the United States 8th Army-Air Force at RAF Bovingdon, England. She married Ralph Tessier in November 1944, and after the war, she and her son John, then aged 7, followed Ralph to Sycamore, Illinois, where Ralph and Eileen had six more children together over the years. After his mother's marriage, John used the last name Tessier, although he was still sometimes called John Cherry.

The Tessier family home in Sycamore was located around the corner from the Ridulph home, less than two blocks away. Ralph Tessier, a sign painter, painted insignia on the doors of Sycamore police cars and was friendly with the police chief. John Tessier was expelled from school in the tenth grade for pushing a teacher and calling her a name. At the time of Maria Ridulph's disappearance, he was 18 years old and living at home with his parents and siblings while making plans to join the U.S. Air Force.

On December 4, investigators visited the Tessier home as part of their neighborhood search for Maria. According to Tessier's half-sisters Katherine Tessier (Caulfield) and Jeanne Tessier, their mother told the investigators that John Tessier had been home on the night of December 3, something that they later testified was not true. Shortly thereafter, before Maria's body was found, the FBI investigated Tessier as a possible suspect. Sources differ on whether the investigation was triggered by a tip from a local resident or by John Tessier's own parents seeking to clear their son, who they realized had the same name and general description as "Johnny".

The U.S. Post Office at 401 S. Main St. in Rockford, Illinois, where John Tessier (Jack McCullough) said he made a collect call and spoke to military recruiters on the evening of December 3, 1957.

Tessier and his parents told FBI investigators that on December 3, 1957, Tessier was in Rockford, Illinois, approximately 40 miles northwest of Sycamore, to enlist in the Air Force. He said he had been in Chicago on December 2 and 3 undergoing physical examinations required for his enlistment. On the morning of December 3, he had visited the Chicago recruiting station and then spent the day sightseeing in Chicago before returning to Rockford by train that evening, arriving there at 6:45 p.m. Upon his arrival in Rockford, he had called his parents to ask for a ride home to Sycamore, since he had taken the train to and from Chicago and left his own car at home. Telephone records were later found showing that a collect call was placed from the Rockford post office to the Tessier home at 6:57 p.m. that evening by someone who gave his name as "John Tassier" as written down by the operator. After making the call, Tessier then met with officers from the Rockford recruiting station to drop off paperwork relating to his enlistment. The officers confirmed that they spoke with Tessier around 7:15 p.m. that evening, although one officer also expressed some concerns about Tessier's credibility and conduct. Tessier was brought to the police station to take a lie detector test, which he passed. In view of his alibi and the lie detector test result, Tessier was taken off the suspect list, and the FBI closed out his report on December 10, 1957, noting: "No further investigation is being conducted regarding the above suspect." Kathy Sigman was never shown a photograph of him or asked to identify him. Tessier left Sycamore the next day to report for basic training at Lackland Air Force Base.

Tessier served in the U.S. military for thirteen years and rose to the rank of captain. After leaving the service, he moved to Seattle, Washington, where he subsequently graduated from the King County Law Enforcement Academy in June 1974 and became a police officer in the small town of Lacey near Olympia. He later joined the police department in Milton, Washington, where he clashed with the chief of police, who attempted to fire him and documented a long list of complaints about his work and conduct. In 1982, in Tacoma, Washington, Tessier took in a 15-year-old runaway, Michelle Weinman, and her friend, who knew Tessier as a Milton police officer. Weinman later testified that shortly after she began living with Tessier, he fondled her and then performed oral sex on her. Tessier was charged with statutory rape, a felony. After plea negotiations, he eventually pleaded guilty to communication with a minor for immoral purposes, a misdemeanor. He was sentenced to one year of formal probation and was terminated from the Milton Police Department on March 10, 1982.

On April 27, 1994, John Tessier legally changed his name to Jack Daniel McCullough, saying that he wanted to honor his late mother. By 2011, McCullough, now in his early 70s, was living at a retirement community in northwest Seattle where he worked as a security guard.

McCullough was found innocent of Ridulph's murder after an acquittal trial on April 15, 2016. In 2017, he was issued a certificate of innocence regarding Maria's murder.

=== William Henry Redmond ===
In 1997, Sycamore Police Lieutenant Patrick Solar closed the then-40-year-old Ridulph case, naming William Henry Redmond, a former truck driver and carnival worker from Nebraska who had died in 1992, as the man who had likely abducted and killed Maria Ridulph. Redmond had been charged in 1988 with the 1951 murder of an 8-year-old Pennsylvania girl, although that case was dismissed when a police officer refused to reveal the name of a confidential informant. Redmond was also a suspect in the 1951 disappearance of 10-year-old Beverly Potts in Ohio. According to Solar, Redmond told a fellow inmate that he committed a crime similar to the Ridulph abduction and murder. Solar also believed that Redmond's appearance and behavior matched that of "Johnny".

Solar's report was criticized due to lack of supporting evidence and alleged political motivations. Solar himself acknowledged that the evidence against Redmond was circumstantial and that if Redmond had lived, it would have been difficult to convict him in the Ridulph case unless he confessed. For that reason, Solar called the Ridulph case "closed, but not solved", leaving open the possibility that a better suspect might later be found. When Jack McCullough was later tried in the Ridulph case, the trial judge ruled out any testimony about Redmond on the grounds that he was not a credible suspect.

== Reopening of the case ==
The case was reopened in 2008 based on allegations from McCullough's half-sister Janet Tessier. According to Janet, their mother Eileen Tessier on her deathbed in January 1994 had said, "Those two little girls, and the one that disappeared, John did it. John did it, and you have to tell someone." Janet took the statement as meaning that her half-brother John Tessier had kidnapped and murdered Maria Ridulph; she had also heard from her older sisters, Katherine Tessier Caulfield and Jeanne Tessier, that Eileen had lied to investigators that he was home on the night of the crime. Another of McCullough's half-sisters, Mary Pat Tessier Hunt, was also present when Eileen spoke to Janet, but later testified that she had only heard her mother say, "He did it." Nevertheless, Mary Pat testified that she had the same understanding as Janet and that her older sisters had suspected John Tessier of the murder for years. At the time, Eileen, a cancer patient, was on morphine and according to her doctor was "disoriented". McCullough, who allegedly had once threatened to kill Janet with a gun and sexually molested his half-sister Jeanne when she was a minor, was estranged from the Tessier family by the time of Eileen's death. He was told not to attend her funeral.

Janet Tessier said that she made several fruitless attempts over the next fourteen years to get law enforcement, including the Sycamore police and the FBI, to look into her mother's statement. Patrick Solar, who during part of this time was a lieutenant with the Sycamore police and had identified William Henry Redmond as the most likely suspect in the Ridulph murder, told CNN that Janet had never spoken to him, but that he would not have suspected John Tessier because he knew the Tessier family, Ralph Tessier had painted the Sycamore police cars, and John Tessier had been cleared by the FBI in 1957. In 2008, Janet e-mailed an Illinois State Police tip line, resulting in the state police cold case unit undertaking a lengthy investigation into McCullough's background and alibi.

Janet's sisters Katherine and Jeanne told investigators of their suspicions, and Jeanne said that John had molested her as a child and other young girls. Another woman alleged that John Tessier had given her a piggyback ride as a child and refused to put her down until her father intervened. State police investigators reviewed evidence and developed a new timeline under which Tessier could have kidnapped Maria and driven to Rockford in time to make a telephone call at 6:57 p.m. and meet with recruiting officers at 7:15 p.m. Under this new timeline, they determined that Maria would have been kidnapped no later than 6:20 p.m. The police search for Maria was underway by 7:00 p.m. according to Katherine, who said she had returned home from a party at 7:00 p.m. to find the search in progress.

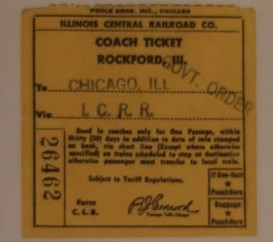
The unused military-issued train ticket from Rockford to Chicago that was not used as evidence against Jack McCullough at his 2012 murder trial.

Hoping to have Kathy Chapman (née Sigman) review a photographic lineup, police took five pictures from the 1957 Sycamore High School yearbook, but John Tessier's picture was not in the yearbook as he had been expelled. Police obtained a contemporary photo of him from his former girlfriend, which differed from the yearbook photos in that Tessier was wearing an open collar rather than a suit and the background was dark rather than light. Chapman identified the picture of Tessier.

Along with the picture, Tessier's former girlfriend provided an unused, military-issued train ticket from Rockford to Chicago dated December 1957. The investigators took this to suggest that contrary to Tessier's alibi, Tessier had not taken the train on his trip to Chicago and had instead driven his car there, meaning that he could have driven back to Sycamore in the afternoon on December 3, kidnapped Maria, and driven to Rockford. The police located a high school friend of Tessier's who recalled seeing Tessier's distinctively painted car in Sycamore that afternoon and said that Tessier did not let anyone else drive his car.

In July 2011 the Seattle Police Department, which had joined with the Illinois State Police in the investigation, brought McCullough in for questioning using a professional interrogator due to McCullough's law enforcement experience. At first, McCullough spoke calmly and cooperated, but when faced with questions about the murder of Maria Ridulph and his whereabouts on the night of the crime, he became evasive and aggressive. After McCullough refused to answer any more questions, he was arrested for the kidnapping and murder of Maria Ridulph and extradited to Illinois.

Maria's body was exhumed that same month to check for DNA evidence, but none could be found. However, a forensic anthropologist found that Maria had been stabbed in the throat at least three times by a long, sharp blade, pointing out nicks in her sternum and neck vertebrae, consistent with "at least three" slashes to her throat. Although stabbing was considered a likely cause of death, an appellate court later stated that the findings did not preclude other possible causes of death such as ligature strangulation, which could not be adequately investigated due to the decomposition of soft tissue.

News of the arrest in a 54-year-old murder case drew national attention. The lead prosecutor, DeKalb County State's Attorney Clay Campbell, was reluctant to take the case due to its age and the lack of any physical evidence connecting McCullough to the crime. But, after being persuaded by the Ridulph and Tessier families, who all believed that McCullough was guilty, he formally charged McCullough with the kidnapping and murder of Maria.

== Court proceedings ==
=== Trial ===
At the trial in September 2012, the prosecution contended that McCullough was attracted to Maria and decided to kidnap her, but instead ended up killing her, presenting new autopsy reports suggesting Maria was stabbed to death. Although the prosecutors suspected McCullough of molesting Maria, they were unable to prove it and never brought it up in court. Numerous witnesses testified for the prosecution, including Maria's family members, neighbors, law enforcement personnel and Kathy Sigman Chapman, who was the star witness and identified McCullough as "Johnny", the man who had walked up to her and Maria 50 years earlier. Another childhood friend of Maria's testified that she had also been offered a piggyback ride from "Johnny" and identified him as McCullough. Three inmates who were jailed with McCullough testified that he talked about killing Maria. However, their stories were both inconsistent and failed to match the evidence indicating Maria had been stabbed. One inmate said McCullough spoke of strangling Maria with a wire, and another said McCullough accidentally smothered her to stop her from screaming.

The defense argued that the prosecutors and police were pressured by the Ridulph and Tessier families to solve the case and implicate McCullough, although there was no physical evidence, motive, or indication that McCullough was in the area when Maria was kidnapped. McCullough did not take the stand in his own defense on the advice of his attorneys.

On September 14, 2012, McCullough was convicted of the kidnapping and murder of Maria Ridulph and received a life sentence with the possibility of parole after 20 years. He was 73 years old at the time of sentencing.

=== Appeal ===
McCullough appealed his convictions. On February 13, 2015, the Illinois Appellate Court (Second District) upheld his murder conviction, but vacated his convictions for kidnapping and abduction of an infant as being outside the three-year statute of limitations in effect for those crimes in 1957. The decision had no effect on McCullough's life sentence, as the sentencing court had provided that the sentences for kidnapping and abduction would "merge" into McCullough's life sentence for murder. Although the appellate court ruled that Eileen Tessier's deathbed statement should not have been admitted as evidence against McCullough, the court declined to overturn the murder conviction because Judge Hallock did not rely heavily upon the statement in issuing the conviction.

=== Post-conviction proceedings overturning conviction ===
In 2015, McCullough, acting pro se, filed a petition for post-conviction relief asking that his murder conviction be set aside. After McCullough's petition was initially dismissed by the court as "frivolous and without merit", the public defender who had originally represented McCullough at trial — and who had continued to investigate the case while staying in touch with McCullough, despite the fact that he was no longer appointed to defend McCullough — asked the court to reconsider the dismissal. McCullough filed a successive motion that could not be denied without a hearing from the State Attorney's Office.

In response to the motions, DeKalb County State's Attorney Richard Schmack, who had replaced Clay Campbell in that position, conducted an extensive review of the evidence, which led Schmack to conclude that McCullough could not have committed the crime and was innocent. According to Schmack, evidence was kept out of the trial that clearly established McCullough's whereabouts on the evening of Maria Ridulph's abduction and supported his alibi. In particular, phone records from Illinois Bell showed that McCullough made a collect call to his mother that evening from a payphone in downtown Rockford rather than from Sycamore as alleged at his trial. Given the timing of the telephone call, the approximately 40-mile distance between Sycamore and Rockford, and icy road conditions, Schmack concluded that McCullough could not possibly have been in Sycamore at the time of Maria Ridulph's disappearance.

Following a March 2016 court hearing, on April 15, 2016, Judge William P. Brady of the Illinois Circuit Court vacated McCullough's original conviction and sentence and ordered a new trial. McCullough, who remained charged with the crime, was released on bond that day pending the new trial. A week later, Judge Brady dismissed the charges against McCullough; however, the dismissal of the murder charge was without prejudice, meaning that McCullough could be tried again for the murder of Maria Ridulph should a prosecutor wish to do so. Brady postponed ruling on a request by Maria's brother Charles Ridulph, backed by the signatures of hundreds of Sycamore citizens including the city's mayor, that a special prosecutor be appointed to replace Schmack on McCullough's case. On August 5, 2016, Judge Brady denied the motion for a special prosecutor; Charles Ridulph then stated that he would not appeal the ruling.

McCullough was declared innocent of the crime by the DeKalb County Circuit Court on April 12, 2017.

=== Freedom of Information Act Requests ===
On July 21, 2016, Porter, son-in-law of McCullough, filed a lawsuit (Case 2016-CH-09536 (Cook County, Illinois)) against the Illinois State Police and Sycamore Police Department for refusal to comply with a Freedom of Information Act request related to the investigation of the case. The FOIA request was prompted by Schmack's allegations of police misconduct on November 3, 2015.

== Memorials ==
The "Maria Ridulph Memorial Map", an eight-foot-square map of Sycamore constructed of steel and porcelain, was mounted on the front exterior of the Sycamore Municipal Building in 1958, in commemoration of Maria Ridulph. The map was removed in 2002 and replaced with a bronze memorial plaque that was installed on a pedestal outside the Municipal Building.

The Ridulph family also established a "Maria Ridulph Memorial Fund" that was originally used to pay for the memorial map and was later used as a scholarship, compassion and summer camp fund for local children in need. A portion of the proceeds from Charles Lachman's 2014 book about the case, Footsteps in the Snow, was donated to the fund.

== In popular culture ==
At the time of McCullough's 2012 trial and conviction, the case was the subject of several news documentaries, including an episode of 48 Hours and a CNN Interactive web feature entitled Taken: The Coldest Case Ever Solved. A true crime book by Charles Lachman, Footsteps in the Snow (2014), also became the basis for a Lifetime Movie Network documentary of the same name. These works, which were published before McCullough's conviction was overturned, presumed that the case had been successfully solved. In contrast, Northern Illinois author Jeffrey Dean Doty self-published a non-fiction book, Piggyback (2014), in which he reviewed evidence and court filings in the case and examined whether McCullough had been wrongfully convicted.

As part of his review of McCullough's case, State's Attorney Richard Schmack read Taken, Footsteps in the Snow, and Piggyback, and cited to portions of Taken and Footsteps in his 2016 court filing supporting McCullough's innocence.

== See also ==
- Disappearance of Beverly Potts
- Murder of Amy Mihaljevic
- List of kidnappings (1950–1959)
- Lists of solved missing person cases
- List of unsolved murders (1900–1979)
