= William Henry Redmond =

American child molester and suspected serial killer

- Born: January 22, 1922; Conneaut, Ohio, U.S.
- Died: January 2, 1992 (aged 69); Grand Island, Nebraska, U.S.
- Occupation: Fairground worker
- Status: Deceased
- Motive: Pedophilia; Sexual sadism
- Criminal charges: Homicide; Involuntary manslaughter Kidnapping; Assault
- Penalty: Unattributable due to death

Details
- Victims: 1–7+
- Span of crimes: 1949–1987
- Country: United States
- State: Various
- Date apprehended: 1988

William Henry Redmond (January 22, 1922 – January 2, 1992) was an American child molester and suspected serial killer. Redmond, an Ohio native and former carnival worker, was indicted in 1988 for the 1951 Pennsylvania murder of 8-year-old Jane Marie Althoff. Redmond was also a suspect in the 1951 disappearance of 10-year-old Beverly Potts in Ohio and the unsolved murder of 7-year-old Maria Ridulph in 1957. In prison, Redmond reportedly told a cellmate that he had killed at least three other young girls.

== Early life and criminal history ==
William Redmond was born on January 22, 1922, in Conneaut, Ohio, to Byron and Edith Redmond. After he sexually assaulted two young girls in Lancaster, Ohio, in 1935, he was arrested for the first time and given a sentence that included time in both the Ohio State Reformatory and the Ohio State Psychiatric Hospital. He was detained once again in 1938 for the attempted rape and assault of a pre-teen girl in Conneaut, Ohio, and he was also charged with sexual assault in Florida in 1949. After serving a sentence for violating the Dyer Act, Redmond was released from the United States Penitentiary in Terre Haute, Indiana, in June 1949. On May 14, 1950, he was found guilty of disorderly conduct in Middletown, New York. Redmond worked as a truck driver and Ferris wheel operator for different traveling fairs.

Redmond was charged in January 1988 with nine offences related to the murder of Jane Althoff in 1951 at a carnival he was working at, including criminal homicide, murder, involuntary manslaughter, kidnapping, simple assault, aggravated assault, unlawful restraint, indecent assault, and endangering the welfare of children. In Grand Island, Nebraska, where he had resided since 1963, he was arrested. Authorities discovered a stash of women's underwear inside his home that they thought belonged to young girls.

Redmond was extradited to Pennsylvania so that he might stand trial for the murder of Althoff. The beginning of Redmond's trial was delayed when the lead detective in Althoff's case refused to tell Redmond's attorney the name of an informant. A judge ruled that he was in contempt of court and banned the detective from testifying. Redmond died at age 69 on January 2, 1992. An inmate who shared a cell with Redmond in 1988 testified that Redmond smirked when he told him about the Althoff murder: “They may have me on this one but not the others.”

== Suspected victims ==
=== Joanne Ena Lynn ===
Joanne Ena Lynn (born April 20, 1938), 11, left her home at 8:00 a.m. on September 19, 1949, to walk to Hemlock Central School in Hemlock, New York. Two drivers who saw a girl matching her description wandering in a rural area towards a grey vehicle with Pennsylvania licence plates reported seeing her last an eighth of a mile from her home. On September 24, while harvesting butternuts four miles from Hemlock, 14-year-old Norma Marsden discovered Lynn's body face-down in a ditch 200 yards off Road 15-A.

Dr. Herbert Brown, Livingston county pathologist, reported that there was “evidence of an attempt to rape” but that the act had not been completed. Lt. William Stevenson of the Batavia State Police told reporters that she had probably been “lured or dragged into an auto, [and] taken out of the car and shot twice as she cringed in a grove of locust trees. One bullet entered her forehead and pierced her arm as she tried to shield her face. The other entered her left breast and emerged from her back.” Both bullets were collected as evidence. Although Lynn was dressed, it was discovered that her sweater and underwear were gone. A German Luger semi-automatic pistol was used to kill Joanne, according to forensic experts. Police interviewed every known sex offender in the area but came up with no leads.

In 1989, after Redmond was finally tracked down and arrested by Pennsylvania police, he was publicly revealed to be a suspect in the murders of several other girls including Joanne Lynn. An article in the Grand Island Independent reported that; “Robert Montgomery, a New York State Police investigator, wrote in an August 1991 affidavit filed in Hall County Court that his agency’s crime laboratory had established a DNA profile of the killer from samples from [Joanne’s] clothing.” The article further stated that Redmond had been a suspect in the investigation since 1951. “Redmond worked before and after Joanne Lynn’s death as a Ferris wheel operator and truck driver for various traveling carnivals. At the time of her death, the Hemlock Fair and Carnival was in progress six miles south of where her body was found.” However, her case remains unsolved.

=== Jane Marie Althoff ===
On April 25, 1951, Jane Marie Althoff (born August 28, 1942), 8, was found murdered shortly after midnight in a pickup truck on the grounds of a Penn-Premier Show carnival south of Philadelphia in Trainer, Pennsylvania. She had died from strangulation, an autopsy revealed. She was a schoolgirl who had joined her two brothers the day before at the carnival. She reportedly wandered off and was reported missing several hours before she was found. According to Chief County Detective Fred Jack, there was no evidence that Althoff had been molested. "We believe that she was enticed into the truck and killed when she screamed or started to scream for help," he said. Jane Marie was seen talking to Redmond at the carnival on the night she was murdered.

The truck cab where Althoff's body was recovered had Redmond's fingerprints all over it. In January 1952, a warrant was issued for his arrest so that he could be questioned; however, it was never executed since he could not be found. Malcolm Murphy, a Pennsylvania state trooper, reopened the case in 1985. Redmond was apprehended at his Grand Island residence in 1988 and transported to Pennsylvania where he was charged with killing Althoff. Murphy located Redmond using computerised vehicle registrations and made the arrest based on a dialogue with him.

According to Delaware County District Attorney William Ryan, Redmond ″made a statement to police inculpating himself″ with the crime after fourteen hours of intense interrogation. Redmond, a former Ferris wheel operator, said that he choked Jane Marie to stop her from bothering him about taking additional rides on the Ferris wheel he oversaw. District Court Judge George Paige ordered Redmond to be detained in a county jail without posting bond, and he scheduled a preliminary hearing for February 8, 1989. Redmond, however, was ultimately determined to be a non-threat due to his advanced age and health issues and was released on a $1 bail. Redmond died in 1992 at his Nebraska home while he was awaiting trial. When Murphy refused to disclose the identity of a confidential informant, Althoff's case was dropped.

=== Beverly Rose Potts ===
Beverly Rose Potts (born April 15, 1941), 10, left her residence in the 11300 block of Linnet Avenue in Cleveland, Ohio, in the evening hours on August 24, 1951. She took her bicycle to the Showagon, an annual summer festival, with a female friend about eighth of a mile from Beverly's house in Halloran Park where the Showagon was held. Beverly's mother granted her special permission to attend the Showagon despite Beverly being forbidden to visit the park since she once returned home from there late a few days before. Just after 7:00 p.m., Beverly and her companion made it to the park, but they left their bicycles there right away and went back to their house. They later made a second appearance at the carnival at 8:00 p.m. after returning to the park.

Beverly was permitted to stay until the end of the evening, but her friend had to leave at 8:40 p.m. so that she could get home before it got dark. She claimed that when she last saw Beverly, she was standing in front of a little, chubby woman with her hand on Beverly's shoulder, watching a show. The woman might have been the mother of a performer in the Showagon. About 9:30 p.m., when the Showagon was over and Halloran Park was starting to clear, Beverly was last seen. A 13-year-old acquaintance saw a girl he believed to be Beverly walking diagonally across the park, headed in a northeast direction towards her home. Her peculiar walk helped him identify her. When she was last seen, she was around 150 feet from the intersection of West 117th and Linnet Streets. When she still had not returned home and their search of the region had turned up nothing, her parents called the police and reported her missing at 10:30 p.m.

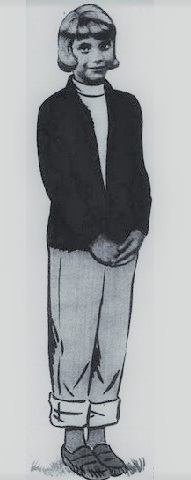
Police artist sketch of Potts, depicting the clothing she wore at the time of her disappearance

Redmond, a carnival employee, was thought to be involved in Potts' disappearance. Beverly was older than his previous putative victims, and Redmond was never firmly linked to her apparent kidnapping. When Cleveland police questioned Redmond about her disappearance in January 1988 while he was being held in Pennsylvania, he flatly refused to say anything about it. According to Robert Montgomery, a New York State Police investigator: "At that time, he indicated to police that he would provide information relevant to the Cleveland, Ohio, case after speaking to his Pennsylvania attorney. However, the interview was not continued." Beverly remains missing and foul play is suspected in her disappearance.

=== Constance Christine Smith ===
Constance Christine "Connie" Smith (born July 11, 1942), 10, was a young girl who disappeared after running away from a summer camp she was attending. She was residing at Camp Sloane in Salisbury, Connecticut, for a portion of the summer of 1952. On the morning of July 16, 1952, she got into a fight with other female campers; as a result, her nose was bloodied. In order to drop off an ice pack she had used the night before when she fell out of her tent and hurt her hip, Connie told her tent mates that she would forgo breakfast that morning and instead walk to the camp clinic. She moved away from the camp and along Indian Mountain Road, leaving the ice pack in her tent and never visiting the pharmacy.

Around a half-mile from Camp Sloane, Connie was seen picking daisies by the side of the road and asking multiple people how to go to Lakeville, Connecticut. With only one week left of her term at Camp Sloane, she supposedly chose to leave because she felt homesick. Later in the day, Connie was last seen walking on U.S. 44 in Salisbury, close to the crossroads of U.S. 44 and Belgo Road. She appeared to be trying to hitchhike, possibly to Lakeville, with her thumb out. She did not have any additional cash or clothing on her. Connie vanished without a trace. Connie's disappearance has had numerous suspects throughout the years, but no one has ever been put on trial.

One of the possible suspects is Redmond, who was investigated for involvement in Connie's disappearance. William had been charged with murdering 8-year-old Althoff who was killed one year prior to Connie's disappearance. In relation to Smith's case, Redmond passed a polygraph examination, and investigators were unable to pinpoint whether William was in the Connecticut area when Connie vanished. She is still missing.

=== Barbara Gaca ===
7-year-old Barbara Gaca (born November 7, 1947) disappeared on March 24, 1955, after leaving home to walk to school six blocks away. In the Gratiot-Seven Mile neighbourhood of Detroit, she was last seen walking between her house and Assumption Grotto School. On March 31, 1955, a train worker discovered Barbara's body, which was covered in an Army blanket. She had been sexually assaulted, strangled, and stabbed fifteen times before being dumped at an Oakland County landfill. After interviewing friends and family members, it was determined that Barbara had spoken to a young male neighbour at the intersection of Linnhurst and Gratiot, four blocks from her school. She explained to him that she was waiting for a friend. Another neighbour claimed to have witnessed Barbara being dragged into a vehicle. Two further witnesses claimed to have seen a 1954 green Hudson at a gas station that morning near 10 Mile and Groesbeck.

The driver was described as a 40-to-45-year-old man who was 150 pounds, around 5-feet-6 inches tall. An attendant was pumping fuel while a girl that matched Barbara's description was inside the vehicle; the girl seemed terrified according to the gas station attendant. Other witnesses came forward saying that between 10:30 and 11:00 a.m. on the day of Gaca's kidnapping, they had seen a new Buick with a cream-coloured top parked near her dump site. After thirteen pages of details regarding the murder were sent to the FBI's Violent Criminal Apprehension System (VICAP) in 1996, Redmond came to light as a suspect. Redmond's whereabouts at the time of Barbara's murder are unknown although investigators determined that an individual with the name "William Henry Redmond" was working for a railroad in New Mexico at the time of her murder. Her murder is still unsolved.

=== Maria Elizabeth Ridulph ===
7-year-old Maria Elizabeth Ridulph (born March 12, 1950) disappeared from Sycamore, Illinois, on the evening of December 3, 1957. Her remains were found almost five months later in a wooded area near Woodbine, Illinois, approximately 90 miles from her home. Maria was last seen by a friend on the corner of Center Cross Street and Archie Place in her neighbourhood with an unidentified male in his early twenties who went by the name "Johnny." In September 2012, Jack McCullough, formerly known as John Tessier, was found guilty of killing Maria. The DeKalb County State's Attorney stated in March 2016 that a post-conviction analysis of the available evidence revealed McCullough could not have been present at the scene and at the time Maria Ridulph was most likely abducted. On April 15, 2016, McCullough was freed from prison, and on April 22, 2016, the accusations against him were dropped. The DeKalb County Circuit Court found McCullough not guilty of the felony on April 12, 2017.

In 1997, Sycamore Police Lieutenant Patrick Solar closed the Ridulph case, naming Redmond as the man who had likely abducted and killed Ridulph. Solar claimed that Redmond admitted to a fellow prisoner that he had committed a crime resembling the kidnapping and murder of Ridulph. Redmond's demeanour and actions, in Solar's opinion, were similar to "Johnny." Redmond, according to Solar, frequently traveled close to the location where Ridulph was discovered when he was employed as a truck driver in the neighborhood at the time.

The research by Solar received criticism for its lack of supporting data and purported political undertones. Redmond would have been difficult to convict in the Ridulph case if he had survived, according to Solar himself, who conceded that the evidence against him was purely circumstantial. Because of this, Solar declared the Ridulph case to be "closed, but not solved," leaving open the chance that a more suitable suspect could be identified in the future. The trial judge disallowed any testimony about Redmond because he was deemed to have not been a plausible suspect when Jack McCullough was later prosecuted in the Ridulph case. Ridulph's murder remains unsolved and her killer unidentified.

=== Jillian Dee Cutshall ===
9-year-old Jillian "Jill" Dee Cutshall (born February 19, 1978) was last seen at approximately 6:30 a.m. on August 13, 1987, in Norfolk, Nebraska. She resided in Grand Bend, Kansas, with her mother and brother after her parents got divorced. When she vanished, she was in Norfolk with her father and stepmother. They resided in McNeely Apartments. After they both departed for work early that morning, Cutshall started strolling to her babysitter's home four blocks away because she did not like to be in their apartment alone. Jillian failed to show up and has not been seen since.

When she did not arrive home after 3:00 p.m., her stepmother went to the babysitter's house to pick her up and discovered she was not there; her babysitter had assumed she had made the decision to stay home. Her belongings—clothes, shoes, and keys—were discovered in the Wood Duck Wildlife Refuge in Stanton, Nebraska, three months after she vanished. This location was ten miles from her father's house. Police in Nebraska looked into whether Redmond was connected to the disappearance of Cutshall because of his past, but they were unable to link him to it. Eventually, the state deemed Cutshall to be legally deceased. Since then, a man has been charged with kidnapping her and is suspected of killing her, but he has never been indicted.
