= Nels J. Smith =

American politician (1939–2023)

Speaker of the Wyoming House of Representatives
- In office 1977–1979

Member of the Wyoming House of Representatives
- In office 1963–1979

Personal details
- Born: January 29, 1939 Newcastle, Wyoming, U.S.
- Died: September 1, 2023 (aged 84) Lingle, Wyoming, U.S.
- Party: Republican
- Spouse: Jeanette Keener
- Relations: Nels H. Smith (grandfather)
- Education: University of Wyoming
- Occupation: Rancher

Nels Jensen Smith (January 29, 1939 – September 1, 2023) was an American politician in the state of Wyoming. He served in the Wyoming House of Representatives as a member of the Republican Party. He served as Speaker of the Wyoming House of Representatives from 1977 to 1979. He attended the University of Wyoming and was a rancher. His grandfather, Nels H. Smith, was a Governor of Wyoming.

== Early life and education ==
Smith was born in Newcastle, Wyoming, into a politically active family. Smith's parents were Peter and Helen (Jensen) Smith. He was born while his grandfather was governor of Wyoming and both he and his sister Connie Smith were christened at the governor's mansion. Connie Smith disappeared in 1952 at age 10 while attending summer camp in Connecticut, and was never found. The case is unsolved.

Smith attended the University of Wyoming from which he graduated with bachelor's degree in 1961. Subsequently, he purchased several ranches in Sundance, Wyoming and managed the operations himself.

== Political career ==
Smith began his political career in 1962 when he won the Crook County seat in the Wyoming House of Representatives. During his time in the legislature, Smith, a Republican, sponsored several notable bills including the first strip mine reclamation law in the West. Smith also worked on several populist causes including authoring a state constitutional amendment which prohibited the implementation of a state income tax and championing a sales tax rebate for the elderly and disabled.

In 1975, Smith was chosen by his party to chair the Legislative Management Council, a position he held until 1978. Smith also served as the Majority Floor Leader and Speaker Pro Tem. In 1977, during his eighth and final term in office, Smith was given the position of Speaker of the Wyoming House of Representatives.

After leaving the state legislature, Smith continued to run his ranches and stayed heavily involved in Wyoming politics. As president of the Wyoming Taxpayers Association, he worked for the formation of a state Budget Adjustment Account. In 1982, Smith mounted a campaign for the governor's office. He led the polls leading up to the primary, but had quit the race citing on-going health issues.

In 1983, Smith became Wyoming's Public Service Commissioner. He was an active member of the National Association of Regulatory Utility Commissioners. He continued to serve on the state Public Service Commission until 1991.

Nels J. Smith died in a car accident on September 1, 2023, at the age of 84. His wife was also killed in the same accident.
