= Disappearance of Beverly Potts =

Unsolved 1951 disappearance in the United States

Beverly Potts
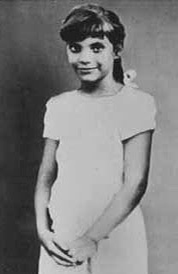
- Potts, c. 1951
- Born: Beverly Rose Potts; April 15, 1941; Cleveland, Ohio, U.S.
- Disappeared: August 24, 1951 (aged 10); Cleveland, Ohio, U.S. 41.45624°N 81.75647°W
- Status: Missing for 75 years and 8 days
- Known for: Missing person
- Height: 4 ft 11 in (1.50 m) (approximate)
- Parents: Robert Potts; Elizabeth Potts (née Treuer)
- Family: Anita Lois Potts (sister)
- Distinguishing features: Caucasian female. 90 pounds. Blonde hair, blue eyes. Small, round scar on upper left arm; small scar above left eyebrow. Kidney-shaped birthmark upon rear of left foot.

Beverly Rose Potts (April 15, 1941 – disappeared August 24, 1951) was a ten-year-old American girl who disappeared while walking home from a neighborhood festival event held in a park less than a quarter of a mile from her home in Cleveland, Ohio. Despite intense publicity and exhaustive efforts to locate the girl, both at the time of her disappearance and in more recent decades, no trace of Potts or definitive leads as to the circumstances surrounding her disappearance have ever materialized. Foul play is strongly suspected, although no definitive suspect has ever been identified.

Potts' disappearance implemented the largest manhunt to locate a missing person in the history of Cleveland at the time. The case itself is regarded as one of the most infamous missing persons and cold cases in Ohio and has been described by one author as "one of the most haunting and heartbreaking mysteries" in the history of Cleveland.

== Background ==
Beverly Potts was the younger of two daughters born to Robert and Elizabeth (née Treuer) Potts. The family resided in a modest home in a middle-class neighborhood in Cleveland, Ohio, which her father had purchased in 1927. Her father worked long and irregular hours as a stagehand at the Allen Theater in downtown Cleveland, whereas her mother was a homemaker. Her older sister, 22-year-old Anita, worked as a clerk at the National Cash Register Company. Potts' father was of English, Irish, and Scottish ancestry, and her mother was of Hungarian ancestry.

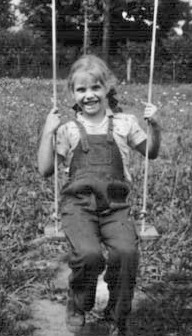
Potts, c. 1946

=== Personality ===
Potts was a quiet, responsible, obedient child who was close to her immediate relatives and who enjoyed music and dancing. She was tall for her age, and affectionately nicknamed "Rosebud" by her mother. According to some accounts, by 1951 she appeared one or two years older than her ten years, although she still enjoyed playing with childhood toys such as dolls. She attended Louis Agassiz Elementary School, where she was regarded as an attentive and popular student who typically achieved B grades.

Although Potts was generally shy but friendly, her best friend, 11-year-old Patricia "Patsy" Swing, later remarked the child was loath to be the recipient of prolonged or cruel jokes and could lose her temper on occasion. Nonetheless, she was described by many who knew her as markedly timid and taciturn when in the company of individuals she did not know — particularly adolescent or adult males outside of her immediate family. This wariness extended to male family members of her close friends, including Swing's own father.

Shortly after her tenth birthday in April 1951, Potts began asking her mother to allow her to change her hairstyle from the distinctive foot-long blonde pigtails she had typically worn since her childhood to a fashionable banged and bobbed hairstyle popular with girls at the time. Although her mother initially refused, she relented in June 1951 and allowed her daughter to have her hair cut short. Elizabeth retained her daughter's pigtails and ribbons in crepe paper.

Throughout her entire childhood, Potts' parents insisted she always observe a strict curfew, and would ground her if she did not return home by the agreed time. One day in mid-August 1951, Potts and a cousin, Amber Lathan, arrived home slightly later than agreed. In response, Potts' mother forbade her daughter from attending an upcoming annual performing show to be held at nearby Halloran Park on August 24. However, as one of her daughter's greatest interests was the performing arts and Potts had been thrilled at the prospect of viewing the performance, her mother agreed to let her attend the event on the condition that she would immediately return home.

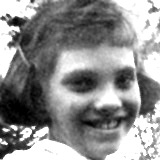
Potts, photographed in Hudson, Ohio, on August 19, 1951, five days prior to her disappearance

== August 24, 1951 ==
=== Showagon performances ===
On the afternoon of August 24, Potts ate supper with her family, then assisted her mother with cleaning the dishes, for which she was paid a nickel. By agreement, she and her best friend and neighbor, Patricia Swing then rode to West Cleveland's Halloran Park to attend the annual summer city-sponsored children's performance event, scheduled to commence at eight o'clock. This location was less than a quarter of a mile from the Potts' Linnet Avenue household and an estimated three-minute walk from her home. The two rode to the park together on their bicycles, leaving the Potts household at around 6:55 p.m. Potts was dressed in a reddish-pink turtleneck shirt, blue denim jeans, a navy blue jacket, and brown Kerrybrooke shoes.

The performance in question at Halloran Park on that date was the Showagon; an annual jamboree-like event jointly sponsored by the City Recreation Department and the Cleveland Press predominantly showcasing the talents of local youngsters with acts including singers, dancing troupes, amateur magicians and acrobatics who performed upon a long flatbed truck converted into a stage. (Note: In the early 1950s, this annual summer festival regularly attracted crowds of up to 1,500 people.) Potts and Swing are believed to have arrived at the park at approximately 6:58 p.m.

=== Halloran Park ===
Halloran Park was the only large playground close to Potts' home. The 11.5 acre park had opened to the public in 1945, and was a popular recreational location for local children, young couples and families. (Note: Halloran Park was named after William Ignatius Halloran, a local serviceman who perished upon the USS Arizona in the Japanese attack on Pearl Harbor. Halloran was the first Cleveland native to die in World War II.) Attending the park unsupervised in the late afternoon was a rare instance for neighborhood children, as locals generally considered the park unsafe after dark, when large trees dimmed the surrounding streetlights and visibility was thus limited. The park was also frequented by the local vagrant population.

According to Swing, beyond exchanging brief greetings with two thirteen-year-old girls whom they both knew, neither conversed with any individual during their time together at Halloran Park, (Note: On September 1, Swing would claim to investigators that a short, plump woman, holding a small child by the hand, had placed her hand on Potts' shoulder as she and Potts had watched the Showagon performances. Swing was unsure whether her friend and this woman exchanged words, although she did recall the woman remarking to others in the crowd that one of her children was performing on stage that evening.) although the sheer size of the crowd made navigating upon their bicycles awkward for both. At 8:10 p.m., deciding it would be easier to maneuver on foot through the increasingly large crowds in attendance, the two returned to their homes to drop off their bikes, arriving back at the park sometime before 8:30 p.m.

At approximately 8:45 p.m., Swing, who had promised her parents to be home before dark, turned toward her friend and suggested the two return home "before dark"; Potts — enthralled by the performances — refused, saying that she had been given permission to stay for the entirety of the show, which was not scheduled to end until after 9 p.m. Swing left the park and returned to her home, arriving at approximately 8:50 p.m. She later informed investigators she had last seen Potts in the crowd, avidly watching an onstage dancing performance.

== Final sightings ==
By 9:30 p.m., the performance event had ended and the estimated 1,500 people at the park had begun returning home. At this time, a 13-year-old boy named Fred Krause saw a girl he believed to be Potts walking diagonally across the park in a northeasterly direction, about 150 yards from the corner of Linnet Avenue and West 117th Street. (This would have been the quickest route for Potts to take to her home, which would then only be two or three minutes' walk away from the park.) The girl was walking on the grass just to the right of the walkway as Krause cycled past on his bicycle. Krause lived on the same street as Potts and knew the girl reasonably well via delivering the Cleveland Press to her home on his paper route. Although his visibility was limited due to the onset of darkness and the fact Linnet Avenue had only four streetlights — each partly obscured by maple and chestnut trees which lined the street in spring and summer— Krause recognized Potts by the distinctive way she walked with her toes pointed at outward angles, a characteristic he and other neighborhood children had termed duck-like. Krause simply sounded his horn as he sped past the girl. (Note: Krause did not report this sighting to police until September 3.)

Other witnesses informed investigators they had seen a girl resembling Potts walking near a stationary, "battered" and crudely painted black 1937 or '38 Dodge coupé with a "smoking, noisy muffler" and recently repaired fenders on West 117th Street, apparently speaking to two young men inside the vehicle. (Note: One of these males is described as having blond hair; the other dark brown or black hair. These two individuals were never traced.) These various eyewitnesses placed this encounter anywhere between 8:30 and 9:30 p.m., although none of these individuals had seen the girl entering the car.

One of the final potential sightings of Potts occurred at approximately 9:45 p.m. close to the intersection of West 110th Street and Baltic Avenue. This sighting was reported by an unidentified woman who informed investigators she had observed a dark colored 1948 coupe, driven by a man she estimated to be in his forties, speeding north on Baltic Avenue with an obviously distressed child upon the back seat with her hands bound behind her back, thrashing and repeatedly shouting "I want to get out!"

== Disappearance ==
When Potts had not returned home by 10 p.m., her family phoned the Swing residence, only to be informed their daughter had returned home alone almost an hour previous and that Potts had remained alone at the park. Her father and sister immediately began to search the area; their search began by retracing the environs of the route Beverly had taken to Halloran Park, then a search of the park itself. The family search then expanded to encompass nearby streets and locations the child may have been before the two returned home. Her sister then fruitlessly phoned the homes of Beverly's friends before the family visited the nearby homes of other close friends who did not have a telephone. On each occasion, they learned their child was not at any of these residences.

Approximately one hour later, at 10:57 p.m., having found no sign of their daughter and sister, the distraught family contacted the police to report Beverly missing. The first officers to arrive at the Potts household would do so shortly after midnight. A routine inspection of the property revealed the child was not hiding at the home, that her bicycle was still in the family garage, and that she had not taken any clothing beyond those she had worn when leaving her home. Furthermore, her piggy bank still contained all her savings, including the nickel she had earned the previous evening.

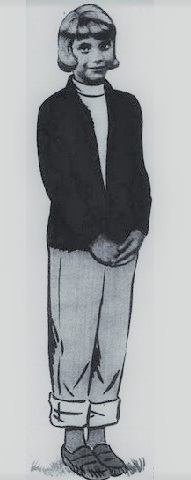
Police artist sketch of Potts, depicting the clothing she wore at the time of her disappearance

=== Investigation ===
Police immediately launched an intense effort to locate Potts; their efforts began by searching the local vicinity and questioning friends, acquaintances, and individuals known to have been at Halloran Park. By daylight on August 25, a large-scale, statewide manhunt to locate the child was implemented, and numerous suspects were detained and interrogated over the following weeks. The individuals to assume overall charge of the investigation were Detective Chief James McArthur — appointed to head the investigation on the morning of August 25 — and, later, officer David Kerr. (Note: Kerr would join the manhunt to locate Potts on August 30 due to an ultimately discounted lead that Potts had been struck and killed by a Chevrolet coupé owned by a teenager named Beverly Saunders (described in contemporary press articles as a "hot rod queen") who had loaned her vehicle to two teenagers who had struck and killed Potts. A forensic examination of Saunders' vehicle had revealed several blonde hairs on a door hinge, although Saunders herself was blonde.) McArthur assigned 45 officers full-time to search for the child. Their physical searches were bolstered by numerous auxiliary police and civilian volunteers.

Potts' family members were soon cleared as suspects as investigators rapidly determined that her home life had been stable and by all accounts happy, and there appeared to be no reason for her to have run away. Furthermore, all three agreed to undergo — and passed — polygraph tests. Investigators also learned from Potts' mother that on August 24, her daughter was eagerly anticipating a family trip to Euclid Beach Park, which the family had been scheduled to embark upon the morning after her disappearance.

With assistance from over 1,000 volunteers, police implemented a large-scale search for the child. The search included door-to-door canvassing of nearby neighborhoods, tracing suspicious cars, searching nearby vacant lots, sewers, and wasteland, and the usage of two Civil Air Patrol planes to survey open railway cars and other potential areas of interest as far afield as Edgewater Park and reservations alongside the Rocky River. (Note: House-to-house searches of all properties upon and around Linnet Avenue were not conducted until September 14. These searches were conducted only in instances where homeowners gave their consent.) Creeks and swimming pools were also dragged, divers also searched Lake Erie, and members of the public outside the designated search radius were encouraged to search vacant lots and empty buildings. All these avenues of investigation failed to yield results.

An off duty Cleveland Police patrolman at Halloran Park, George Vorell, informed police he had observed two young men aged between seventeen and twenty openly leering at young girls watching the Showagon performances. These two individuals had walked behind the stage and out of Vorell's sight shortly before the conclusion of the performances. Another individual to report lewd behavior at the park was a classmate of Potts, Patricia Nagg, who informed police a young man had repeatedly thrust his hips back and forth in a manner simulating intercourse as he had stared at her. These three individuals were never traced.

On August 29, the Cleveland News reported police had arrested a strong suspect in the case: William Slates. Slates was a 25-year-old, unemployed former serviceman who lived with his widowed mother on West 116th Street. He had previously been arrested in 1949 for making sexual advances toward an eight-year-old girl in a local movie theater. As such, he was known to police and locals alike for his unhealthy interest in underage girls.

Slates's name was given to authorities by a neighbor who reported he had abruptly boarded up his home the day after Potts' disappearance and left the neighborhood, having first borrowed a friend's car. (Note: Slates's mother was midway through a two-week vacation in Virginia at the time.) A police search of his home revealed a loaded .25 caliber in a bureau drawer. He was quickly traced to a hotel in Columbus and returned to Cleveland. Although two of Slates's friends gave conflicting accounts of his movements on the evening of Potts' disappearance and a polygraph test indicated deception when Slates was questioned about the child, he was released from custody when his 17-year-old girlfriend provided an alibi in which she claimed Slates had been "making out" with her in a car at Edgewater Park on the evening in question.

=== Media coverage ===
Media interest in the child's disappearance was intense. All three statewide television stations and all editorials devoted intense publicity to Potts' disappearance and the ongoing ordeal of her family, who granted several interviews in which they stated their belief their daughter had been abducted and was being held against her will, emphasizing in one interview: "She's being held by someone. Beverly is too shy to go along willingly; she was so shy nothing could have enticed her to go with anyone ... she'd been earnestly warned about talking with strange persons."

Most news broadcasts and newspaper articles were accompanied by images of Potts, a description of the child and her clothing, the circumstances surrounding her disappearance, updates regarding the investigation and — by the Tuesday following her disappearance— a police artist's sketch of the child wearing the clothing she wore on the evening of her disappearance. All media broadcasts and literature were accompanied by public appeals for information, with investigators regularly providing updates as to the progress of their investigation.

By the week following Potts' abduction, numerous potential suspects had been eliminated from the inquiry. The Federal Bureau of Investigation had also distributed 22,000 circulars nationwide, (Note: Contemporary legal provisions enacted after the 1932 Lindbergh kidnapping prohibited the FBI from becoming actively involved in the manhunt unless an abductor either contacted his/her victim's relatives via telephone or sent a ransom note. As Potts' family received neither, the bureau was unable to legally become involved in the investigation.) and a reward of $1,500 (equivalent to $18,606 in 2025) had also been offered by her father's labor union, AFL-Stagehands, for any information successfully leading to the whereabouts of his daughter and the identity of her kidnapper(s). (Note: The public reward sum for information leading to Potts' return would eventually reach over $8,000.)

As a result of police and media appeals, investigators assigned to the case received several thousand telephone tips — some obvious hoaxes, others considered worthy of investigation. All credible tips were pursued; however, all failed to bear fruition.

== Theories ==
In the days following Potts' disappearance, investigators considered two scenarios as being the most likely for the child's absence: she had been abducted either for ransom, or to be subjected to a sexual assault. All mail to the Potts household was intercepted and screened for ransom demands or distasteful hoaxes before a detective brought the mail to the household; however, no ransom note was received in the days or weeks following Potts' disappearance. As such, the likelihood the child had been kidnapped for ransom was soon discounted. Investigators thus strongly suspected that the actual motive behind the child's abduction was sexual, that the perpetrator(s) was most likely a local individual known — at least by sight — to Potts, and that the child had almost certainly either been forced into a car or lured into a home close to Halloran Park.

Three months prior to Potts' disappearance, in May 1951, a five-year-old Lakewood girl named Gail Ann Michel had been abducted from a local department store. The child was found abandoned, but unharmed, eighteen hours later. The same month, two underage girls had been sexually assaulted in Halloran Park, and just weeks prior to Potts' disappearance, three local women had been sexually assaulted in locations close to the Potts household. On August 26, all known sex offenders — with or without a predilection for children — residing in Cleveland's West Side were also questioned with regards to their whereabouts on the date of Potts' disappearance; all 65 individuals were eliminated from the inquiry.

Potts was known to be markedly shy, especially around men. She was also cautious of any strangers — male or female. Many senior investigators theorized the child had likely been enticed into a nearby house or car on her way home by someone she knew, perhaps with the promise of a babysitting job (Note: Despite her youth, Potts was considered by neighbors and family friends to be a responsible child. As such, she had frequently been entrusted to babysit for neighborhood children.) or a request to run an errand, with the abduction itself most likely occurring upon a moment of opportunism. This theory was considered particularly likely to Inspector James McArthur, who declared to reporters on August 29: "[Potts] lived in a happy home and had no desire to run away. I think she was taken away in an automobile by a person or persons she knew well enough to talk to. Every bit of evidence in this case, every report, and every conversation leads to the conclusion that Beverly absolutely would not have gone anywhere with a stranger."

=== Potential investigative flaw ===
One theory pursued in the months and, particularly, years following Potts' disappearance was that the child had been killed by a neighbor and her body buried within or upon the grounds of one of the properties either on or near to Linnet Avenue which the child had passed as she returned home from Halloran Park. The fact that house-to-house searches of all homes upon and close to the street where Potts had lived were not conducted until September 14 — and then only in instances in which owners gave police their consent — has been viewed by more recent investigators as a major flaw in the original investigation, which had viewed such an invasion of homeowners' privacy without any hard evidence or strong suspicion as unorthodox.

== Family statement ==
One week after the disappearance of their daughter and sister, the Potts family issued a public appeal to her abductor(s), stating they accepted the likelihood Beverly was no longer alive and pleading for the return of her body in order that the child could receive a decent Christian burial, stating: "We have finally come to the realization we will never see our Beverly alive again. We urge whoever did this terrible thing to write or telephone to us, or the police, the location of Beverly's body so that we can reclaim [her] and give her a decent Christian burial."

Beverly Potts (center), pictured with her parents and sister at Christmas 1947

Potts' abductor(s) failed to respond to this appeal.

== Later developments ==
=== 1950s ===
On September 4, 1951, a warehouse worker named Henry Palmer observed a human-shaped, cloth-wrapped form measuring approximately 5 feet (1.5 m) floating in the Cuyahoga River current behind the building where he worked. Palmer observed what he believed to be human hands and feet protruding from the edges of this bundle; his observations were corroborated by a Mrs. Ada Skrovan, who also observed a similarly-wrapped package — which she remained adamant had been bound with rope — in the vicinity. Both individuals separately informed police of their sightings. Although the river bed was dragged, the bundle sighted by both was never located.

By mid-September, press attention to Potts' disappearance began to decrease, although all developments in the case continued to be publicized. The number of officers assigned full-time to the search for Potts began to gradually decrease in 1952. Nonetheless, the case remained active, with investigators remaining determined to locate the child or her body. By the following year, Inspector McArthur publicly remarked there was virtually no hope of locating the child alive, although he continued to search for the child until his retirement in 1957.

The police card filing system implemented to cross-check information relating to Potts' disappearance had expanded to contain 2,800 entries relating to potential public sightings, suspects, and tips by April 1952. Over 1,200 of these records detailed potential suspects — some of whom resided in states as remote as Washington. Each had been questioned and eliminated. Over 500 vehicles either sighted in the vicinity of Potts' abduction or linked to potential suspects had also been traced and their owner's alibi verified.

In 1954, police arrested a middle-aged man, a 20-year-old woman, and a 24-year-old man on charges of peddling pornographic photographs. One individual depicted in the cache of seized images was a prepubescent girl bearing a resemblance to Potts. Although the individuals insisted the child was not Potts, her parents initially believed otherwise, before changing their minds.

=== 1970s and later ===
A anonymous tip to authorities from an unnamed Chardon woman who claimed to have known Potts as a child was received in early 1973. This individual claimed her friend's body was buried in the "grease pit" of a former auto repair shop, leading to an April 1973 search of what had once been the inspection pit of an auto body shop on West 52nd Street; however, this search proved negative.

In 1980, two retired Cleveland police detectives, James Fuerst and Robert Shankland, revealed that in 1974 they had received a tip from a local attorney with a client whose brother had supposedly confessed to abducting Potts. The detectives subsequently found and questioned the brother, who, they said, had readily admitted to having lived near Halloran Park in 1951 and making a habit of picking up and molesting young girls there. The man did not remember abducting Potts in particular, but said he had "flashes" of memory involving a girl named Beverly. Fuerst and Shankland were convinced the man was guilty, but the county prosecutors' office refused to pursue the case, citing a lack of evidence.

In February 1994, a couple renovating a house on Midvale Avenue, Cleveland, discovered several pieces of yellowing notebook paper alongside a man's shirt beneath old carpeting upon the stairs. The author of this note, Anna Haynik, recorded in detail what she insisted were the "true facts" surrounding the abduction and murder of Beverly Potts, which she insisted had been committed by her husband, Steve (aged 40 at the time of the crime). Haynik further alleged her husband was the Potts' milkman.

According to the author, her husband had previously raped Potts' mother and was therefore likely Beverly's biological father; Potts herself had died of an accidental drug overdose before her husband had dismembered the child's body. The note further alleged Haynik had caught her husband in the act of incinerating her remains in the basement furnace. Upon being traced and questioned by police, Haynik (then aged 83) admitted penning and concealing the notes, but insisted all the allegations were false; she had written and hidden the letter in 1953 solely as a revenge fantasy against her abusive husband. Furthermore, by the time of his death in 1981, she had completely forgotten about the document.

Beginning in July 2000, a series of handwritten letters were sent to the editorial offices of the Cleveland Plain Dealer, purporting to be from an elderly man who claimed that as he was terminally ill and "in the twilight of [his] life", he wished to confess before his death to molesting and murdering Potts.

According to the author, Potts' murder was unplanned, as he had "only wanted to (sexually) fondle" the child upon luring her into his vehicle, although when Potts had begun screaming, he had struck her into unconsciousness before proceeding to sexually fondle her. Upon realizing the blows he had inflicted had proven fatal, he had then thrown her body into the Cuyahoga River — from where, the author speculated, her body had drifted to Lake Erie.

Investigators strongly questioned the authenticity of these claims; this skepticism increased as several sentences and claims contained in successive letters to follow had evidently been copied from previous hoax letters and false claims made by previous suspects — leading to speculation the author may be a retired police officer. The anonymous author pledged to turn himself in on the fiftieth anniversary of Potts' disappearance, but shortly beforehand, wrote to say he had to enter a nursing home and would be unable to honor his promise or otherwise reveal himself. An extensive investigation failed to turn up any clues to the author's identity, and investigators believe the letters to have been a distasteful hoax. Other letters sent by a separate individual and received by Cleveland Police in July 2002 are also viewed as hoaxes.

== Suspects ==
=== William Ross Slates ===
Slates was a 25-year-old former serviceman who had lived with his widowed mother on West 116th Street, close to Halloran Park, since 1950. He had previously been arrested in March 1949 for making sexual advances toward an eight-year-old girl in a local movie theater, resulting in his being placed on a year's probation and his dishonorable discharge from the armed forces.

Slates is known to have fraudulently borrowed a friend's car the day after Potts' disappearance and abruptly left the neighborhood. Via police tracing phone calls made to his 17-year-old girlfriend's home, he was quickly traced to a hotel in Columbus and returned to Cleveland. Two of Slates's friends — Dale Smallwood and Fraser Jenkins — provided varying and conflicting accounts of his movements on the evening of Potts' disappearance and Slates himself was unable to offer a plausible explanation for his abrupt decision to leave Cleveland. Police interest in his potential culpability was further heightened when a polygraph test indicated deception when Slates faced questions pertaining to Potts' abduction. Nonetheless, no physical evidence could be found linking Slates to the child. He was released from custody when his girlfriend provided an unverifiable alibi — contradicting Slates' own claims as to his whereabouts on the evening of August 24 — that she had been "making out" with him in a car on the evening in question.

No surviving documentation exists to indicate whether investigations into Slates continued after he was released from custody. He died in 1978.

=== Frank Dale Davis ===
Davis was a 52-year-old ex-convict arrested in the early hours of November 15, 1951, while attempting to extort a ransom payment from Potts' family having falsely claimed to have kidnapped their daughter and sister. He had begun contacting the Potts family on November 9, claiming to be holding Beverly captive and demanding a $25,000 ransom for her release as opposed to cutting the "very sick" child's throat. Robert Potts successfully bartered the anonymous caller's ransom sum to $5,000 and agreed to hand over the money upon the promise his daughter would be released to her mother outside the Terminal Tower "within three hours." Against the caller's instructions, Potts informed Inspector McArthur of these developments.

Davis insisted in his calls to Robert that his wife, Elizabeth, should deliver the ransom sum alone to 750 Prospect Avenue at the prearranged time of 5:30 a.m., although an undercover detective named Bernard Conley dressed as Elizabeth to apprehend the caller in a sting operation approved by Potts' parents and in which several armed officers were deployed at discreet locations.

By prearrangement, Conley took a Yellow Cab to the caller's instructed destination in the early hours of November 15; Davis was arrested at gunpoint minutes later when — as the caller had promised — he waved a handkerchief from afar instructing Elizabeth to approach and hand the ransom package to him, then leave the scene.

After seven hours of interrogation, Davis admitted the attempted extortion, claiming he had been "strapped for money." He denied any knowledge of the abduction, and was formally cleared of any involvement by police. Davis later pleaded guilty to charges of blackmail and extortion, for which he was sent to the Ohio State Penitentiary. He was paroled on July 1, 1957.

=== Harvey Lee Rush ===
Rush was an impoverished 47-year-old drifter and Cleveland native who had relocated from his home city to Los Angeles in the spring of 1951, where he sporadically worked as a hospital attendant. He briefly became a suspect in Potts' abduction in December 1955 following his arrest for public intoxication in Los Angeles. According to his official three-page confession, Rush admitted to murdering a girl in his home city whom he claimed to have met at a "puppet event". He claimed to have buried the girl in a shallow grave beneath a bridge spanning the Rocky River.

The discrepancies in Rush's confession were immediately apparent to Cleveland Police; he incorrectly described his victim as being 12-years-old, bespectacled, with shoulder-length brown hair — also insisting he had committed this murder in July 1952, whereas Potts was ten years old, with dark blonde, bobbed hair, had never worn glasses, and was last seen in August 1951. Moreover, he could not give the girl's name or a consistent description of her facial features or her clothing. However, Rush had previously lived close to the Potts household in the 1940s. Despite severe skepticism from senior investigators, Rush was extradited to Cleveland on December 15.

Rush recanted his entire story almost immediately after his extradition to Cleveland, saying he had confessed merely as a way to ensure his return to his hometown. Upon disproving Rush's confession, investigators were legally unable to detain him. (Note: For several days prior to his arrest for public intoxication, Rush had repeatedly attempted to borrow money from family in Cleveland in order to return to his home city; he had spent the $25 his mother had sent him for a bus ticket on alcohol on the afternoon of his arrest.)

=== William Henry Redmond ===
In January 1988, William Henry Redmond (b. January 22, 1922), an Ohio native and former carnival truck driver and Ferris wheel operator with an extensive record of child molestation convictions relating to young girls dating back to 1935, was indicted for the April 25, 1951 murder of eight-year-old Jane Marie Althoff in Trainer, Pennsylvania. Althoff's body was discovered in Redmond's carnival vehicle, and his fingerprints were discovered at the crime scene; however, he had fled the state by the time of the discovery of her body and assumed an alias. He was only located in Grand Island, Nebraska, in 1988.

By the time of his questioning about the Potts case in March 1988, Redmond was terminally ill; he was informed no further charges would be brought against him if he confessed to Potts' murder and revealed the location of her body. Redmond refused to make a statement admitting or denying his culpability in the case.

Although investigators were unable to prove his whereabouts on the date of Potts' disappearance, the circumstances surrounding her abduction are dissimilar to other confirmed and suspected victims of Redmond, who simply abandoned his victims' bludgeoned bodies with little or no attempt at concealment. He died in 1992.

=== Maple Heights Child Molester ===
This unnamed individual first became known to investigators as a suspect in Potts' abduction in 1974 following a letter sent to a Cleveland lawyer by a client who named his own brother as the individual likely responsible for the child's murder.

According to the author, his brother had an extensive history of sexually molesting female children and had fled Cleveland in 1966 after being indicted for abducting two young girls, but had recently returned to Maple Heights. He had also recently confessed to his sibling to having kidnapped and murdered a young girl close to Halloran Park in the early 1950s.

An investigation into this suspect's background revealed numerous arrests for child molestation, including time served at the Ohio Penitentiary for the sexual abuse of a young girl in 1951. He was arrested approximately three weeks after his brother had sent the letter to authorities, and freely admitted to having resided close to Halloran Park in the early 1950s and to have frequently "prowled" the district in search of underage girls to molest. (Note: According to police records, upon being informed of his arrest, the first words this individual had stated were: "You finally got me. I'm glad it's all over.") One of the detectives to question this individual, Robert Shankland, would later recollect the suspect had divulged details of the crime only "someone who had been there could have known" and the records of the vehicle he had owned in 1951 matched eyewitness descriptions of one of the cars sighted in the vicinity of Halloran Park at the estimated time of Potts' abduction; however, investigators were unable to find sufficient evidence to charge this individual.

The vast majority of contemporary records pertaining to the actual investigations relating to this subject have been lost — likely having been taken from case files by investigators in their inquiries into the June 1980 abduction and murder of eight-year-old Maple Heights schoolgirl Tiffany Papesh and never returned to their appropriate archives. Beyond his age being "in his fifties" by 1980, no further details as to this individual's actual identity are known.

== Aftermath ==
The disappearance of Beverly Potts remains one of Cleveland's most infamous missing persons cases, with information still sought by investigators, and a Crime Stoppers reward of $15,000 remaining active.

Potts' sister relocated to another city in 1952; she later married and bore three children. Her mother, Elizabeth, died of liver disease on May 11, 1956, at age 56. Shortly after Elizabeth's death her husband, Robert, remarked to the media his wife's health had been "going downhill ever since Beverly disappeared." Robert continued to live alone at Linnet Avenue for several years; he died alone of heart failure on February 11, 1970. His body was found slumped upon a couch in the living room with the television switched on. He and his wife are interred in West Park Cemetery in Cuyahoga County, Ohio.

"I still think of her as ten years old ... she's still a little girl. It's hard for me to visualize how she would look today."

— Anita Potts Georges, reflecting on her memories of her sister. November 2003.

In 1991, Potts' sister, Anita, unveiled a memorial stone to her sister directly alongside the graves of her parents. At the unveiling, Anita declared that if her sister's remains were ever discovered, she should be laid to rest beneath this memorial stone, alongside her parents. This marker is inscribed with the words: "In Memory of Beverly Rose Potts."

Anita Potts Georges continued to search for her only sister until her own death in 2006. She seldom discussed her sister's disappearance in much detail. However, the effect of her sister's abduction greatly impacted her own parenting. According to her daughter, Megan Roberts (b. 1964), the event "absolutely affected her parenting. She was strict, and always wanted to know where we were, who we were with ... but she very seldom spoke of Beverly other than to tell us she had a sister that disappeared. She would say it was just too painful to talk about ... it was very emotional for her."

== Media ==
=== Bibliography ===
- Badal, James Jessen (2005). Twilight of Innocence: The Disappearance of Beverly Potts. Kent, Ohio: Kent State University Press. ISBN 0-873-38836-4.
- Pettem, Silvia (2017). The Long Term Missing: Hope and Help for Families. Maryland: Rowman & Littlefield. ISBN 978-1-442-25680-4.
- Sprague, Donald F. (2013). Investigating Missing Children Cases: A Guide for First Responders and Investigators. New York: Taylor & LFrancis Group. ISBN 978-1-439-86063-2.

=== Television ===
- The 2004 documentary Dusk & Shadow: The Mystery of Beverly Potts draws direct inspiration from Potts' disappearance. Directed by Mark Wade Stone, this 53-minute documentary was first broadcast on December 14, 2004. Potts' sister, Anita, is among those interviewed by the director.

== See also ==
- Child abduction
- Cold case
- List of kidnappings (1950–1959)
- List of people who disappeared mysteriously (1910–1970)
- National Center for Missing and Exploited Children
- The Doe Network
