= 1938 Wyoming gubernatorial election =

- November 8, 1938
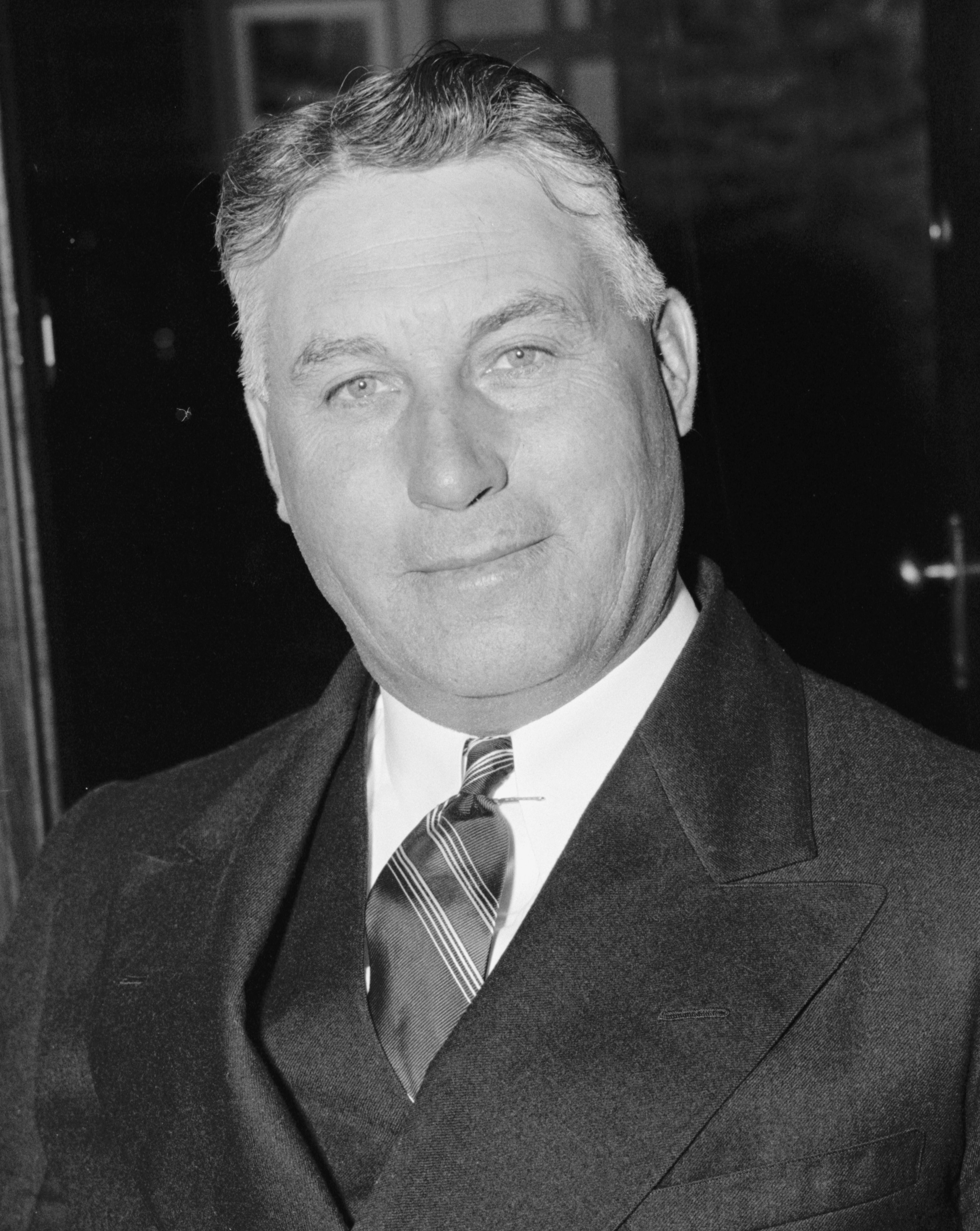

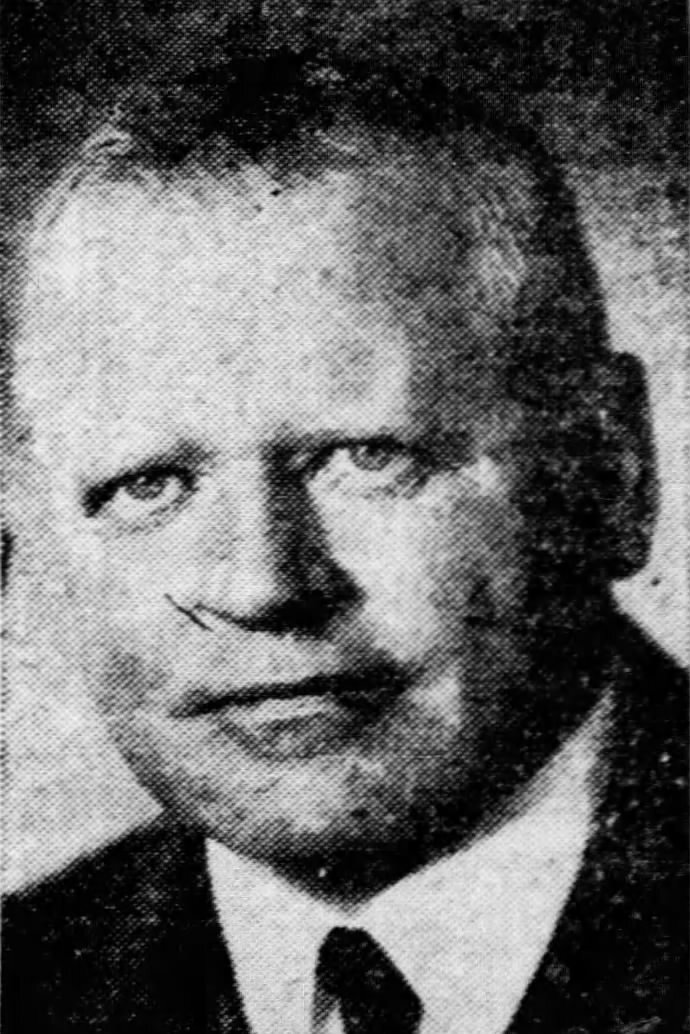
Nominee	Nels H. Smith	Leslie A. Miller
Party	Republican	Democratic
Popular vote	57,288	38,501
Percentage	59.81%	40.19%
- County results Smith: 50–60% 60–70% 70–80% Miller: 50–60%
Governor before election
Leslie A. Miller
Democratic
Elected Governor
Nels H. Smith
Republican

The 1938 Wyoming gubernatorial election took place on November 8, 1938. Incumbent Democratic Governor Leslie A. Miller ran for re-election to his third term, and his second full term. Nels H. Smith, a former State Representative and former state highway commissioner, won a crowded Republican primary and advanced to the general election against Miller. Though Miller won his re-election campaign four years earlier in a landslide, Smith was able to take advantage of the nationwide Republican wave to defeat him in a landslide, winning 60% of the vote to Governor Miller's 40%.

== Democratic primary ==
=== Candidates ===
- Leslie A. Miller, incumbent Governor
- Gus F. Engelking, rancher

=== Results ===
Democratic primary
Party	Candidate	Votes	%
Democratic	Leslie A. Miller (inc.)	23,464	69.43%
Democratic	Gus F. Engelking	10,333	30.57%
Total votes		33,797	100.00%

== Republican primary ==
=== Candidates ===
- Nels H. Smith, former state highway commissioner, former State Representative, 1934 Republican candidate for Governor
- Thomas A. Nicholas, former Campbell County Prosecuting Attorney
- Josiah H. Holland, Mayor of Evanston
- John F. Raper, Sheridan attorney
- Samuel S. Hoover, Mayor of Green River, former State Representative

=== Results ===
Republican primary
Party	Candidate	Votes	%
Republican	Nels H. Smith	13,355	41.66%
Republican	Thomas A. Nicholas	7,361	22.96%
Republican	Josiah H. Holland	6,494	20.26%
Republican	John F. Raper	3,111	9.71%
Republican	Samuel S. Hoover	1,734	5.41%
Total votes		32,055	100.00%

== Results ==
1938 Wyoming gubernatorial election
Party	Candidate	Votes	%	±%
Republican	Nels H. Smith	57,288	59.81%	+18.44%
Democratic	Leslie A. Miller (inc.)	38,501	40.19%	−17.71%
Majority		18,787	19.61%	+3.07%
Turnout		95,789		
Republican gain from Democratic				
