= Vehicle inspection pit =

Pit over which a vehicle can be serviced from beneath

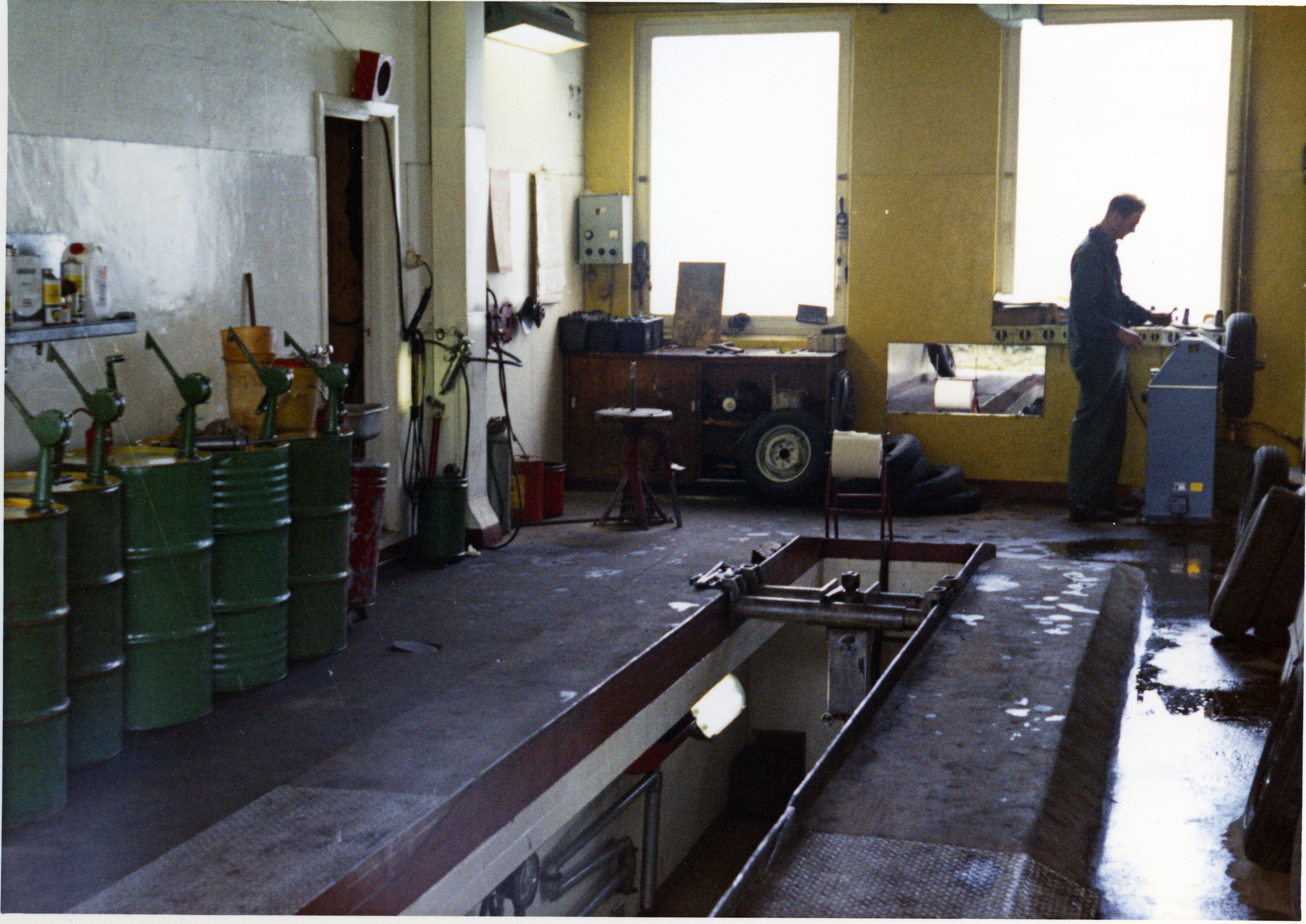
An inspection pit in a garage

A vehicle inspection pit or grease pit is a pit or trench over which a vehicle can be driven and parked to be serviced from beneath. They are typically situated in vehicle inspection bays or garages. A pit obviates the need for a jack or winch. Pits are narrow enough to fit between the wheels of a vehicle yet wide enough for a technician to work in. Access to the pit is provided by steps.

Falls into pits are common accidents. Nets may be placed over unoccupied pits to protect against falls.

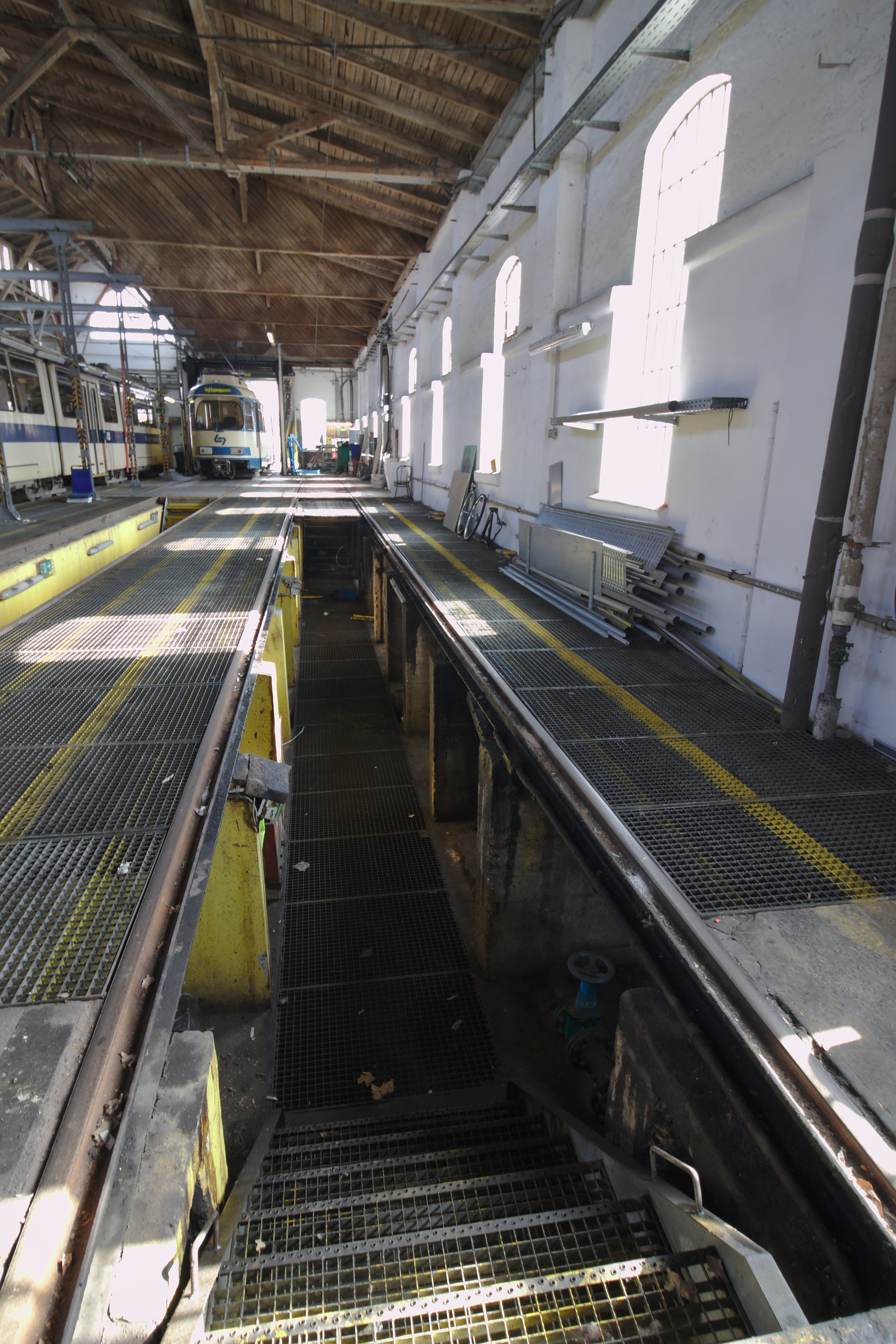
A train or tram inspection pit

Pits must be well ventilated to prevent fires and explosions from hazardous substances.
