= Nels H. Smith =

American politician (1884–1976)

Nels Smith
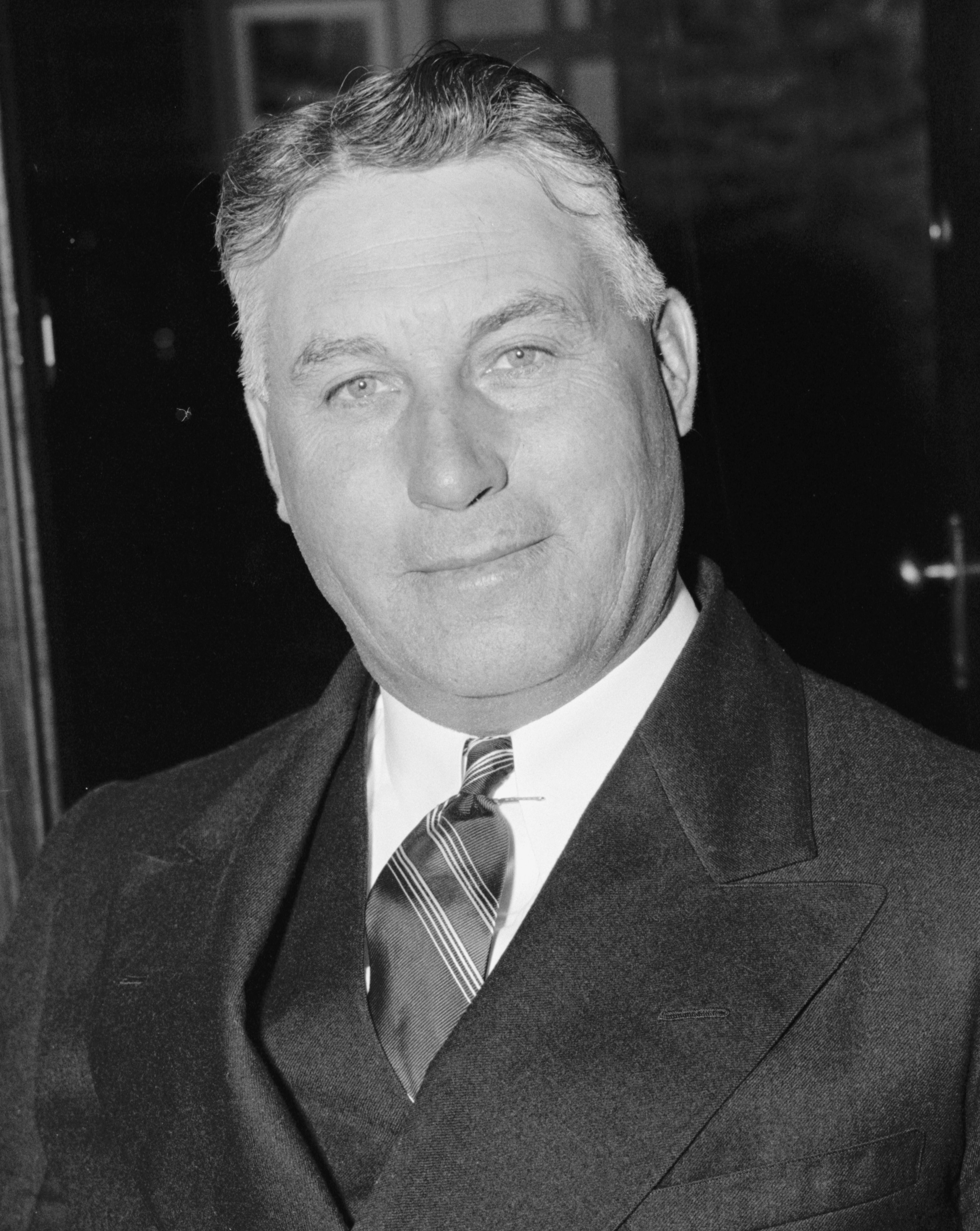

18th Governor of Wyoming
- In office January 2, 1939 – January 4, 1943
- Preceded by: Leslie A. Miller
- Succeeded by: Lester C. Hunt

Member of the Wyoming House of Representatives
- In office 1919–1920

Personal details
- Born: Nels Hansen Smith; August 27, 1884 Gayville, Dakota Territory
- Died: July 5, 1976 (aged 91) Spearfish, South Dakota, U.S.

Nels Hansen Smith (August 27, 1884 – July 5, 1976) was an American politician who served as the 18th governor of Wyoming from 1939 to 1943. A member of the Republican Party, he served in the Wyoming House of Representatives from 1919 to 1920.

== Biography ==
He was born on August 27, 1884, in Gayville in the Dakota Territory to Danish immigrants Margaret (née Larsen) and Peter Smith.

Smith moved to Wyoming in 1907 and subsequently was elected to the Wyoming House of Representatives for the Fifteenth State Legislature. He lived in Crook County.

He was elected governor in 1938, defeating incumbent Governor Leslie A. Miller.

In 1942, when it was proposed Japanese-Americans be relocated to Wyoming Governor Smith told Milton Eisenhower, “If you bring any Japs into my state they will be hanging from every tree.”

He lost the 1942 election to Lester Hunt, a Democrat. In 1942, Smith and two partners bought Ranch A in Crook County, from the estate of Moses Annenberg; it is now listed on the National Register of Historic Places.

He died on July 5, 1976, in Spearfish, South Dakota.

Smith's granddaughter Connie Smith, 10 years old, disappeared in Lakeville, Connecticut (a part of Salisbury, Connecticut) while attending summer camp in 1952. He and his son, Connie's father, exhausted all resources trying to find her, but to no avail. She has never been found.

Party political offices
Preceded by Alonzo M. Clark	Republican nominee for Governor of Wyoming; 1938, 1942	Succeeded by Earl Wright
Political offices
Preceded by Leslie A. Miller	Governor of Wyoming; January 2, 1939 – January 4, 1943	Succeeded by Lester C. Hunt
