= Matthias-Grünewald-Verlag =

- Founded: 1918
- Country of origin: Germany
- Headquarters location: Mainz
- Publication types: Books
- Fiction genres: Catholic publishing house
- Official website: www.gruenewaldverlag.de/

Matthias-Grünewald-Verlag is a German Roman Catholic publishing house founded in Mainz, see of the Roman Catholic Diocese of Mainz.

Mainz was famous for its culture of Catholic publishing houses, where the catholic intelligence was able to publish their intellectual property.

== History ==
=== Origin of name ===
The Matthias-Grünewald-Verlag is named after the painter and graphic artist Matthias Grünewald, who is regarded as an important German representative of the Renaissance.

=== History of the publishing house ===
The publishing house was founded in 1918 in the environment of the so-called Bible Movement and the Liturgical Movement in Mainz. A main crystallization point was the Catholic theologian Romano Guardini. Among others the series Classics of Catholic Theology and the Bible translation of Paul Riessler and Rupert Storr (Mainz Bible) appeared.

In 1944 the Reichsschrifttumskammer (RSK) announced the closure of the publishing house. During the Second World War the publishing house and its archives were completely destroyed. After the war the work was continued.

In 1978 the publishing house, which had been a Kommanditgesellschaft since 1938, was transformed into a GmbH. After Matthias-Grünewald-Verlag was transferred to Schwabenverlag AG on 1 January 2006, the company was suspended in 2006 and in liquidation. The successor company was MGV GmbH, which was deleted from the commercial register on 20 November 2009. Today Matthias Grünewald Verlag is a company of the Patmos publishing group in Schwabenverlag AG in Ostfildern (HRB 210919).

== Publishing program ==
The logo of the publishing house shows the hand of John the Baptist at the Isenheim Altar. The publishing programme with more than 900 titles essentially comprises the areas of Christian theology (also pastoral theology), spirituality, self help in life, psychology and pedagogy. In addition, singing books (Gotteslob editions), magazines and brochures '(pastoral.de) are published. Among the main authors are Anselm Grün, Romano Guardini, Gustavo Gutiérrez, Wilhelm Hoffsümmer, Walter Kasper, Pinchas Lapide, Wunibald Müller, Otto Hermann Pesch and Josef Pieper.

== Bibliography ==
- Jakob Laubach: Zur Geschichte des Matthias-Grünewald-Verlags. – In: Matthias-Grünewald-Verlag, Mainz: 75 Jahre Grünewald-Bücher. Mainz, 1993, ISBN 3-7867-1699-4. – p. 5–28
