= The Lord (book) =

Christological book by Romano Guardini

- Title page for The Lord (1954 edition)
- Author: Romano Guardini
- Language: German
- Subject: Christology
- Genre: Theology, Biography
- Publisher: Werkbund-Verlag
- Publication date: 1937
- Publication place: Germany
- English publication date: 1954
- Media type: Hardcover, Paperback, E-Book at Google Books, Internet Archive
- OCLC: 552897
- Dewey Decimal: 232.9
- LC Class: BT301 .G914
- Preceded by: Das Ende der Neuzeit
- Followed by: Sorge um den Menschen

The Lord (German: Der Herr) is a Christological book by Romano Guardini, a Roman Catholic priest and academic. It was first published in Germany in 1937 by Werkbund-Verlag, and an English-language translation was published in 1954 by Henry Regnery Company.

== Synopsis ==
In The Lord, Guardini wishes to present a correct understanding of Jesus by writing about his life and person, with all the limitations which the subject necessarily imposes. Although Christ lived in a specific historical milieu, and though knowledge of the forces at work in it furthers an understanding of him, Guardini states that a biography of Christ is practicable only within the narrowest confines. Neither Jesus' personality nor his works are immediately traceable to the conditions of the times, for he came "out of the fullness of time contained in the mystery of God, and it was to this mystery that he returned after he had moved among us (Acts 1:22)."

In The Lord, Guardini points to certain decisive events in Jesus' life, recognising specific directions in it and watching their sense evince and fulfill itself; but he also affirms that one shall never be able to ascertain a genuine evolution of character in the life of Jesus. It is equally impossible to motivate the unwinding of Christ's destiny or the manner in which he accomplished his designated mission, for the ultimate explanations - Guardini states - are to be found only in that impenetrable territory which Jesus calls "my Father's will" — territory forever beyond the reach of history. So Guardini ponders such words as "And Jesus advanced in wisdom and age and grace before God and men" (Luke 2:52), and the passage in the Epistle to the Galatians which describes him as one "in the fullness of time," ripening to maturity deeply conscious of the history about him.

Guardini's book typifies modern exegetical criticism, approaching Jesus Christ through the Gospels, placing his life in the context of history and showing how his teachings are related to the whole body of church doctrine and practice. He does not attempt to recount Jesus' life in a chronological or logical sequence. Rather, he selects certain teachings, events, traits, and miracles and meditates upon them, offering considerations and commentary.

Considered a masterpiece by Catholic scholars, The Lord has remained in print for decades and, according to Henry Regnery, was "one of the most successful books I have ever published." The novelist Flannery O'Connor thought it "very fine" and recommended it to a number of her friends.

In an introduction to a 21st-century edition of Guardini's book, Pope Benedict XVI wrote: "The Lord has not grown old, precisely because it still leads us to that which is essential, to that which is truly real, Jesus Christ Himself. That is why today this book still has a great mission."

== Excerpt ==
Understanding of Christ requires a complete conversion, not only of the will and the deed, but also of the mind. One must cease to judge the Lord from the wordly point of view and learn to accept his own measure of the genuine and the possible; to judge the world with his eyes. This revolution is difficult to accept and still more difficult to realize, and the more openly the world contradicts Christ's teaching, the more earnestly it defines those who accept it as fools, the more difficult that acceptance, realization. Nevertheless, to the degree that the intellect honestly attempts this right-about-face, the reality known as Jesus Christ will surrender itself. From this central reality, the doors of all other reality will swing open, and it will be lifted into the hope of the new creation.

— Romano Guardini, The Lord, p. 629

== See also ==
- Jesus Christ
- Christology
- Christian Theology
- Jesuism
- Redeemer (Christianity)
- Lost years of Jesus
- List of books about Jesus
