= October 1968 =

Month of 1968

<<	October 1968					>>
Su	Mo	Tu	We	Th	Fr	Sa
		1	2	3	4	5
6	7	8	9	10	11	12
13	14	15	16	17	18	19
20	21	22	23	24	25	26
27	28	29	30	31

October 12, 1968: Equatorial Guinea becomes world's newest nation

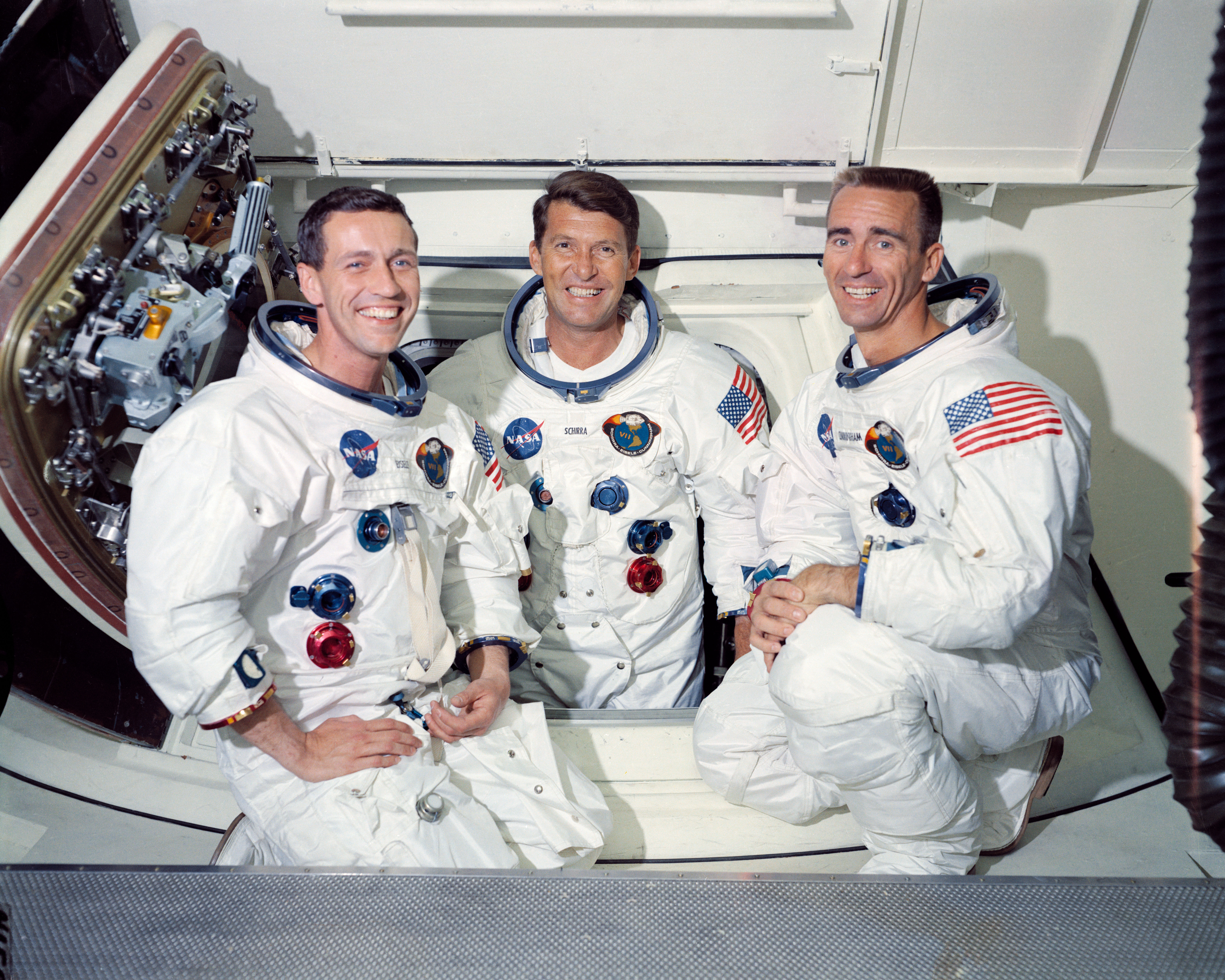
October 11–22, 1968: Apollo 7 launched with Eisele, Schirra and Cunningham

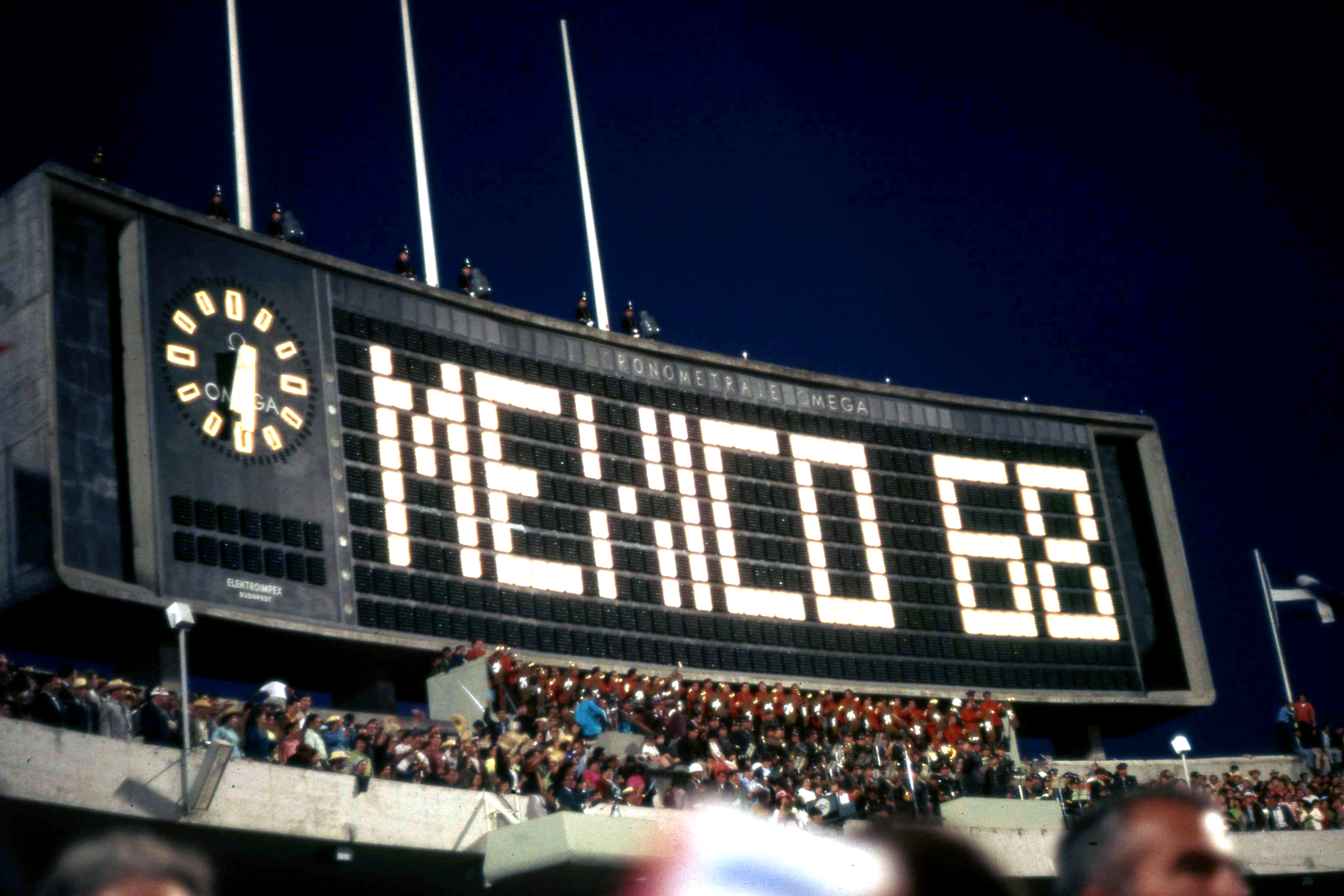
October 12, 1968: Summer Olympics open in Mexico City, 10 days after protesters massacred

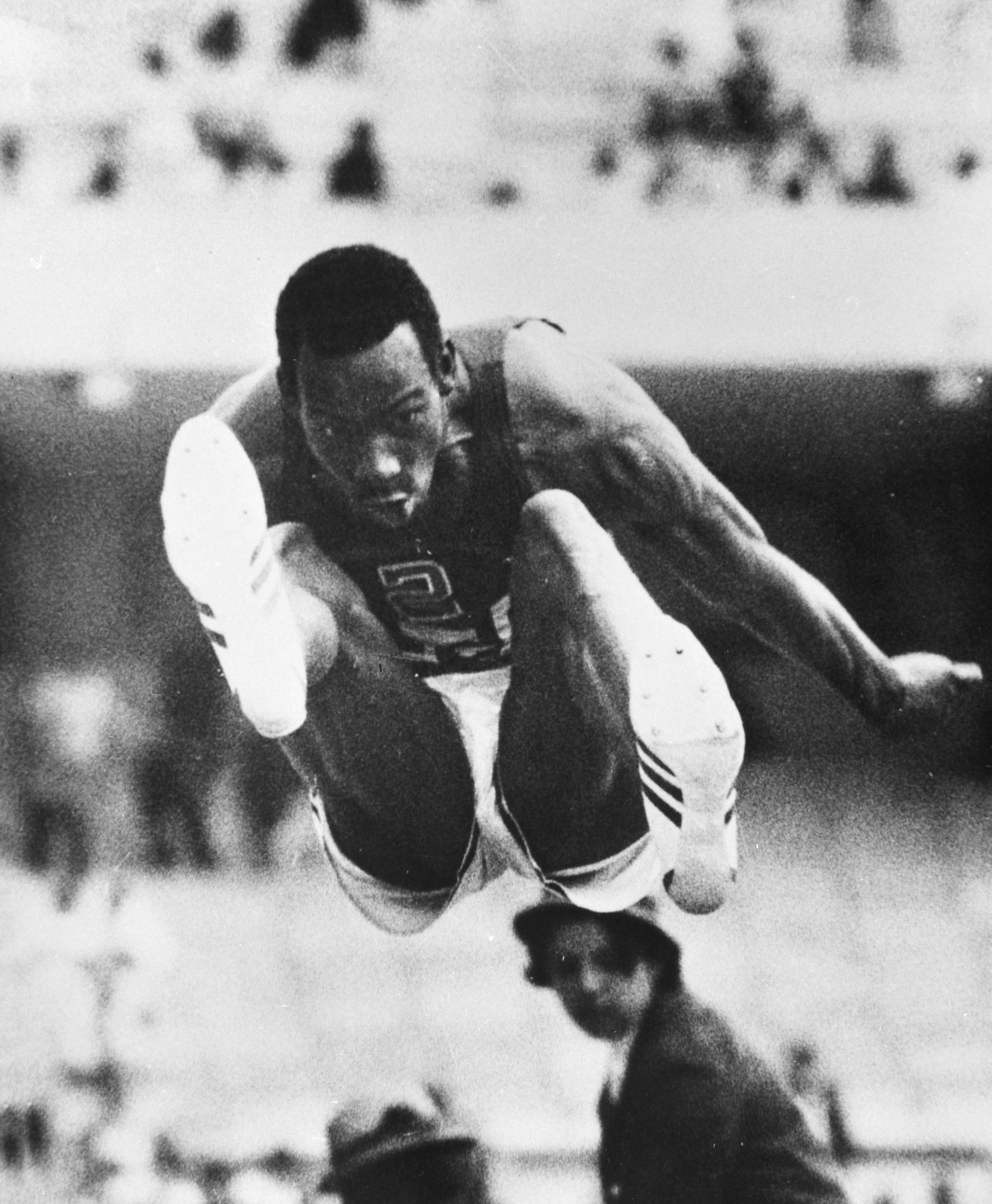
October 18, 1968: Bob Beamon shatters long jump record

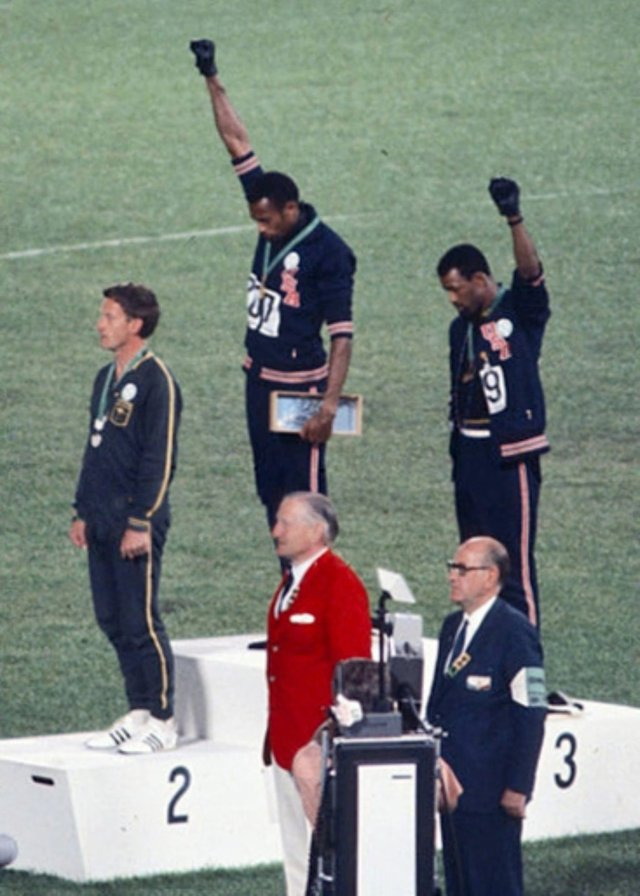
October 16, 1968: U.S. Olympians Carlos and Smith protest during U.S. anthem

The following events occurred in October 1968:

== October 1, 1968 (Tuesday) ==
- Night of the Living Dead premiered in the United States. Originally titled Night of the Flesh Eaters, and filmed in Pittsburgh, Pennsylvania, the movie's first showing was in that city at the Fulton Theatre, at 8:00, with admission by invitation only. An advertisement for the first week of showings said that "If 'Night of the Living Dead' frightens you to death.... You are covered for $50,000", with the disclaimer that the guarantee was valid only for death from a "heart attack only during performances October 2 thru 8, 1968" and that the insurance company reserved the right to require a medical examination before the viewing." One author later noted that the film "was nothing short of a permanent shift in modern horror cinema. Zombies were no longer dullards wandering through mist and fog.. They were people you knew, friends and family... and they had no mercy."
- An attempt failed in the U.S. Senate to end a Republican party filibuster that was delaying action on the nomination of Abe Fortas as Chief Justice of the United States. While the vote was 45 in favor of cloture, and 43 against, the votes of a two-thirds majority of the 88 senators present (59 out of 88) was required. Fortas, who was already on the court as an associate justice, withdrew his name from consideration the next day, providing time for U.S. President Lyndon Johnson to submit the name of another nominee before the November presidential election. Johnson, however, declined to nominate a successor to Chief Justice Earl Warren.
- Dr. Arnulfo Arias was sworn in as President of Panama for the third time in his career after winning the May 12 election over David Samudio, the candidate sponsored by outgoing president Marco Aurelio Robles, a victory that came only after General Bolívar Vallarino, commander of the Panamanian National Guard, had worked to guarantee a fair count of the election. Arias, however, "chose not to respect the deals he had made with the National Guard", a historian later wrote, and was removed after just 10 days in office.
- Born: Kevin Griffin, American singer and lead vocalist of the rock band Better Than Ezra; in Atlanta
- Died: Romano Guardini, 83, German Roman Catholic theologian

== October 2, 1968 (Wednesday) ==
- The "Tlatelolco massacre" took place 10 days before the 1968 Summer Olympics were scheduled to begin in Mexico City, as Mexican police began firing into a crowd of thousands of protesters at the Plaza de las Tres Culturas at the Mexico City neighborhood of Tlatelolco. The Mexican government listed the death toll at only 32 and claimed that most of the victims were killed by students who were firing machine guns from surrounding buildings. Foreign journalists who were present at the scene, and survivors, estimated that between 150 and 500 protesters were killed.
- The National Trails System Act was signed into law in the United States. The federal law has placed more than 50,000 of miles of scenic, historic and recreational hiking trails under the protection of the U.S. Department of the Interior, the longest of which are the historic 5,665-mile (9,117 km) California Trail and the scenic 4,600-mile (7,400 km) North Country Trail.
- Miguel Mujica Gallo was sworn into office at noon as the new Prime Minister of Peru, replacing Oswaldo Hercelles García. Mujica served less than 24 hours; shortly after midnight, he and other Peruvian government officials were arrested during a military coup d'état.
- The Molten-Salt Reactor Experiment (MSRE) reactor in Oak Ridge, Tennessee, first achieved criticality, with a less expensive nuclear fuel, a uranium tetrafluoride ("green salt") processed with the uranium-233 isotope rather than uranium-235.
- Born:
  - Jana Novotná, Czech professional tennis player, winner of 12 women's doubles titles and four mixed doubles titles in Grand Slam events, and the 1998 Wimbledon women's finals (d. 2017); in Brno, Czechoslovakia
  - Victoria Derbyshire, English journalist and broadcaster; in Ramsbottom, Lancashire
- Died: Marcel Duchamp, 81, French painter and sculptor

== October 3, 1968 (Thursday) ==
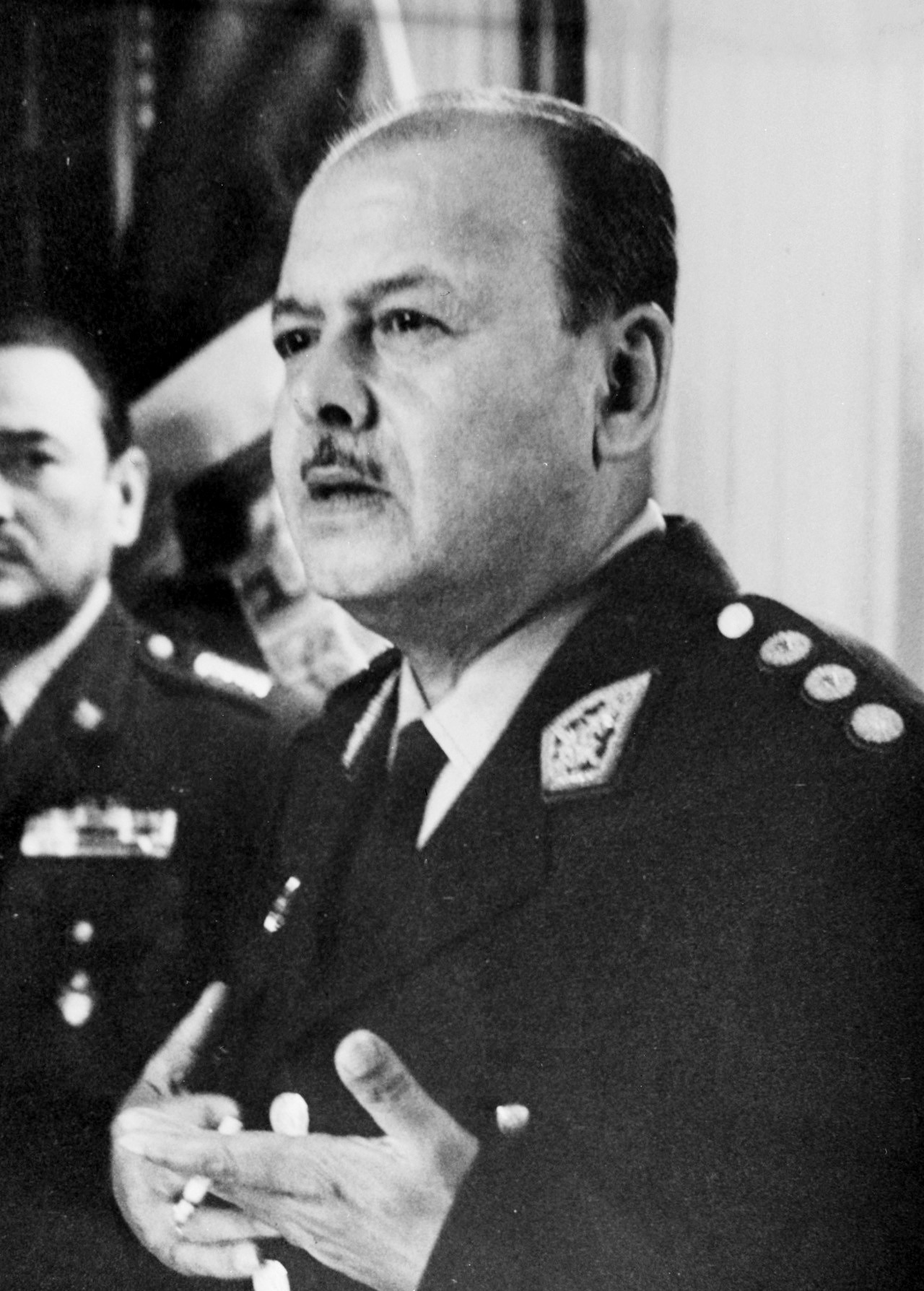
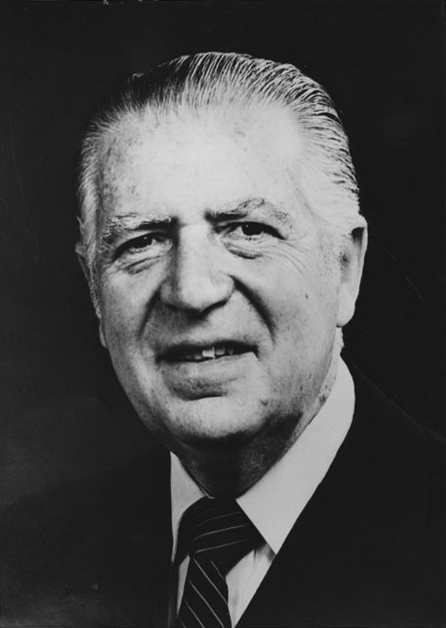
Peru's General Velasco and President Belaúnde
- Peruvian Army General Juan Velasco Alvarado led a coup d'état and overthrew the South American nation's President, Fernando Belaúnde Terry. The predawn change of power was accomplished without bloodshed, and Belaúnde was flown by a Peruvian Air Force plane to exile in Buenos Aires in neighboring Argentina. Velasco's presidency was described later as "one of the most unusual experiences of military rule in Latin American history", with the "Revolutionary Government of the Armed Forces" forcing redistribution of farmlands and increasing the standard of living for Peru's impoverished citizens.
- U.S. presidential candidate George C. Wallace, who was running as the American Independent Party selection against Republican Richard M. Nixon and Democrat Hubert H. Humphrey, introduced his running mate, retired U.S. Army General Curtis E. LeMay. The new AIP vice-presidential candidate told a press conference that although he did not believe that nuclear weapons would be necessary in the Vietnam War, he would not be opposed to their use. "It doesn't make any difference to the soldier whether he is killed by a rusty knife or a nuclear explosion," LeMay commented, adding, "In fact, I'd lean toward the nuclear weapon."

== October 4, 1968 (Friday) ==
- The prototype of the Tupolev Tu-154, a jet airliner with a capacity of 164 passengers and the most common method of air travel in the Soviet Union and Eastern Europe during the 1970s and 1980s, made its first flight.
- The British hard rock band Led Zeppelin, still billed as the New Yardbirds, started their first tour of the UK, appearing at the Mayfair Ballroom at Newcastle, with vocalist Robert Plant replacing Keith Relf and drummer John Bonham taking the place of Jim McCarty. Three weeks later, they adopted their new name, Led Zeppelin (a parody of the phrase "lead balloon"), for an October 25 concert at the University of Surrey, although posters advertising this concert continued to bill them as the "New Yardbirds".
- The Tau Gamma Phi fraternity was founded by four students at the University of the Philippines in Quezon City.
- Died:
  - Baba Harbhajan Singh, 22, Indian Army soldier whose death has become the subject of supernatural legend
  - Francis Biddle, 82, former U.S. Attorney General and former judge at the Nuremberg War Crimes Trials
  - Hitoshi Imamura, 82, Japanese general and convicted war criminal

== October 5, 1968 (Saturday) ==
- "The Troubles", almost 30 years of violence between Protestants and Catholics in Northern Ireland, began when policemen of the Royal Ulster Constabulary at Derry attacked a group of demonstrators marching for the Northern Ireland Civil Rights Association and Derry Housing Action Committee to protest against discrimination against the Roman Catholic minority by Protestants in the portion of Ireland still part of the United Kingdom. Gay O'Brien, a cameraman for the RTÉ television network in neighboring Ireland, and sound technician Eamon Hays filmed the scenes of constables attacking unarmed protesters with clubs, and the footage was shown on the BBC programme Twenty-Four Hours and then worldwide.

== October 6, 1968 (Sunday) ==
- At Huntington Park, California, the initial worship services were held for the Metropolitan Community Church, which described itself later as "the world's first church group with a primary, positive ministry to gays, lesbians, bisexual and transgender services". Reverend Troy Perry, who had been a Pentecostal Christian minister who had resigned after revealing that he was gay, held a service for 12 people in his living room. Within 40 years, the church had "44,000 members and adherents in 300 congregations in 22 countries."
- Died: Stephen Leslie Bradley, 42, Australian child murderer who kidnapped and murdered 8-year-old Graeme Thorne in 1960, died at the minimum security Goulburn Correctional Centre "after a strenuous game" of table tennis.

== October 7, 1968 (Monday) ==
- Jack Valenti, the President of the Motion Picture Association of America (MPAA), announced a new rating system for films distributed within the United States, effective November 1. Declaring, on behalf of the film industry, that "The movie industry would no longer 'approve or disapprove' the content of a film" under the old Hays Production Code of 1934, and that "we would now see our primary task as giving advance cautionary warnings to parents so that parents could make the decision about the movie going of young children" the MPAA announced four ratings. "G" was for general audiences of all ages, "M" was a warning that the content was for mature audiences, "R" was restricted to require a parent to accompany a viewer under the age of 16, and "X" prohibited theaters from admitting persons under 16 "because of treatment of sex, violence, crime, or profanity. "American movies after the fall of 1968 look and sound different from those produced before then," a historian later noted, because it was a method "in the name of self-regulation, to enable the production of mature-themed movies" without making the production code more permissive.
- Prior to the opening of Game 5 of the World Series in Detroit, Hispanic-American singer José Feliciano performed "The Star-Spangled Banner" with a slower, Latin jazz performance, a controversial decision that opened the door for later interpretations of the American national anthem.
- The University of Central Florida (UCF), which would have more than 68,000 students by 2024, held its first classes. In its initial year at its campus in Orlando, UCF was called Florida Technological University, and had 1,948 students.
- Born:
  - Rich McCormick, American physician and politician, Member of the U.S. House of Representatives from Georgia, in Las Vegas, Nevada
  - Thom Yorke, English singer and songwriter for Radiohead; in Wellingborough, Northamptonshire
  - Luminița Anghel, Romanian singer and songwriter; in Bucharest

== October 8, 1968 (Tuesday) ==
- A small group of Republican Congressmen began a 27-hour delay of voting on a bill to amend an existing law that had been blocking the possibility of a televised presidential debate between candidates Nixon, Humphrey and Wallace. The measure was overwhelmingly supported by both parties, and passed by a margin of 280 to 35, but future Chief of Staff and U.S. Defense Secretary Donald Rumsfeld, at the time a congressman from Illinois, combined with Ohio's Robert A. Taft, Jr. to delay the vote by spending almost 19 hours of calling the roll. At the time, a present or absent call of the names of 435 representatives averaged 25 minutes, and Rumsfeld and Taft asked for attendance to be taken a record 45 times. In 1973, almost all roll calls were eliminated with the introduction of an electronic voting system for members of Congress to register their choices simultaneously.
- The latest version of William Shakespeare's 1597 play Romeo and Juliet, directed by Franco Zeffirelli, was released in the United States, seven months after its March 4 premiere in London. Leonard Whiting and Olivia Hussey, both teenagers at the time of filming, played the title roles, marking the first time that the actors were close to the age of the characters portrayed.
- American and South Vietnamese forces launched Operation Sealords, a two-year long joint project to disrupt North Vietnam's supply lines in the Mekong Delta. "SEALORDS" itself was an acronym for Southeast Asia Lake, Ocean, River, and Delta Strategy.
- The Locarno Agreement Establishing an International Classification for Industrial Designs was signed in Locarno, Switzerland.
- Died: Rogers Caldwell, 78, American businessman and banker nicknamed "The J.P. Morgan of the South"; Caldwell lost most of his wealth in the Wall Street Crash of 1929

== October 9, 1968 (Wednesday) ==
- Four days after the suppression of the Irish civil rights march at Derry, 2000 students from Queen's University Belfast (QUB) marched toward Belfast City Hall at Donegall Square, after being denied access to Shaftesbury Square, where a pro-government march by Protestant Unionist Party had been organized by Ian Paisley. When the QUB marchers changed their route, Paisley then reassembled his group and moved to Donegall Square, where Belfast police blocked the students' route. When the QUB students reached police lines, as cameras were filming, the 2,000 protesters sat down in the streets in a show of civil disobedience. From the QUB march, the organization People's Democracy was founded.
- A 13-year-old girl became the first Jew since the 13th century to enter the tombs of the Biblical patriarchs beneath the Cave of the Patriarchs at Machpelah in Hebron, which had been captured by Israel in the Six-Day War. Michal Arbel, the 13-year-old daughter of Yehuda Arbel, chief of Shin Bet operations in the West Bank, volunteered because she was slender enough to be lowered into the narrow, 28-centimetre (11 in) wide hole to gain access to the tomb site, after which she took photographs. Shortly after the taking of Hebron, Major General Shlomo Goren, the Chief Rabbi of the Israel Defense Forces, had been the first Jew to descend past the seventh step of the Mosque built over the site.
- The nuclear generators of the failed Nimbus-B weather satellite were recovered 350 feet (110 m) beneath the Pacific Ocean after a search of more than four months. The rocket boosters carrying Nimbus-B had been destroyed by a command from ground control two minutes after the spacecraft had been launched on May 18, but had failed to reach orbit.
- French Jewish legal scholar Rene Cassin was named as the 1968 Nobel Peace Prize recipient, for his drafting of the Universal Declaration of Human Rights nearly 20 years earlier. When informed of the honor, the 81-year-old jurist reportedly laughed and asked, "Already?"
- Born:
  - Pete Docter, American film director known for Monsters, Inc. and Up; in Bloomington, Minnesota
  - Troy Davis, American convicted murderer whose case gained international fame in the campaign against capital punishment; in Savannah, Georgia (executed, 2011)

== October 10, 1968 (Thursday) ==
- The Detroit Tigers won the World Series by a 4 to 1 score over the heavily favored St. Louis Cardinals, completing an unlikely comeback after having lost 3 of the first 4 games before winning the last three.
- Following its approval by the U.S. Senate, the Gun Control Act of 1968, described as "the first major firearms control act passed by Congress in 30 years", was passed by the U.S. House of Representatives, 160–149. The new law prohibited all sales of guns and ammunition by mail order (a method used by Lee Harvey Oswald to obtain a rifle) and limited over-the-counter gun sales to "qualified purchasers".
- Born: Bart Brentjens, Dutch mountain biker, gold medalist in the 1996 Olympics and in the 1995 world mountain biking championships; in Haelen

== October 11, 1968 (Friday) ==
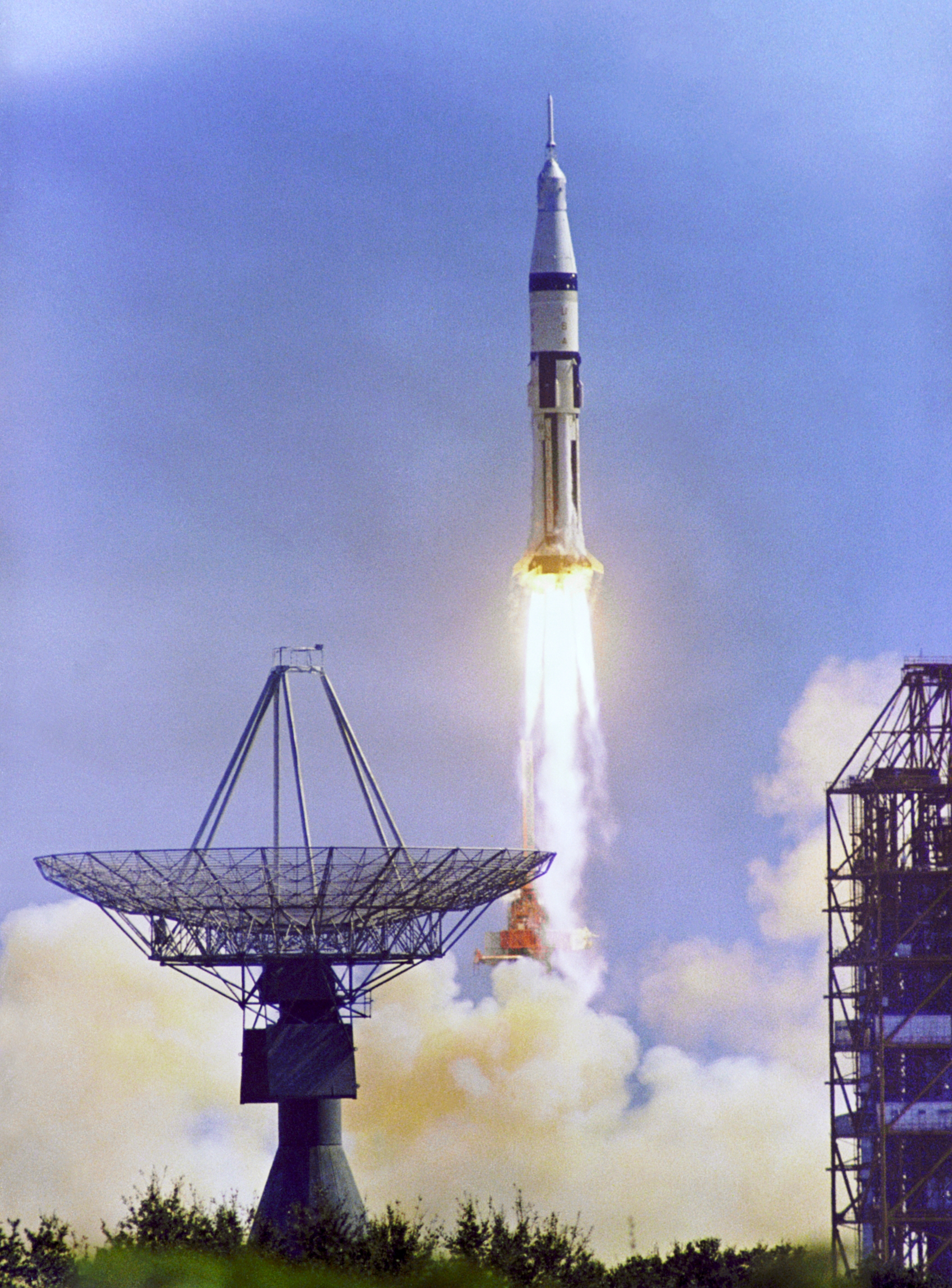
October 11, 1968: Launch of Apollo 7

- Apollo 7, the first American crewed space mission with three astronauts, was launched from Cape Kennedy at 11:02:45 a.m. local time, and glided into Earth orbit within 10 minutes. The purpose of the 11-day mission, the first with three astronauts (Wally Schirra, Donn Eisele, and Walter Cunningham) was to test the docking maneuvers between the lunar module and the lunar orbiter to take men safely to the Moon and back. The flight was the first to feature a live television broadcast from inside an orbiting spaceship (Gordon Cooper's video images from Mercury 9 had been on a delayed basis). Schirra became the only astronaut to fly in the Mercury, Gemini and Apollo programs.
- Panamanian National Guard Majors Omar Torrijos and Boris Martinez led a coup d'état to overthrow the democratically elected (but highly controversial) government of President Arnulfo Arias. The move came after Arias had declined to honor an agreement with National Guard commander Vallarino. Arias, who had been in office for only 11 days, fled to the U.S. controlled Panama Canal Zone, and Colonel Jose M. Pinilla was sworn in as the new President of Panama. The coup was described later as "the first outright military overthrow of the government in the country's history". Within a year, Torrijos ousted Martinez and took charge as Panama's de facto leader. Although never officially the President, Torrijos controlled the Central American republic and, in 1972, was granted constitutional powers with the title of the "Maximum Leader of the Panamanian Revolution" (Líder Máximo de la Revolución panameña), serving until his death in a plane crash in 1981.
- Born: Jane Krakowski, American television and film actress; in Parsippany, New Jersey

== October 12, 1968 (Saturday) ==
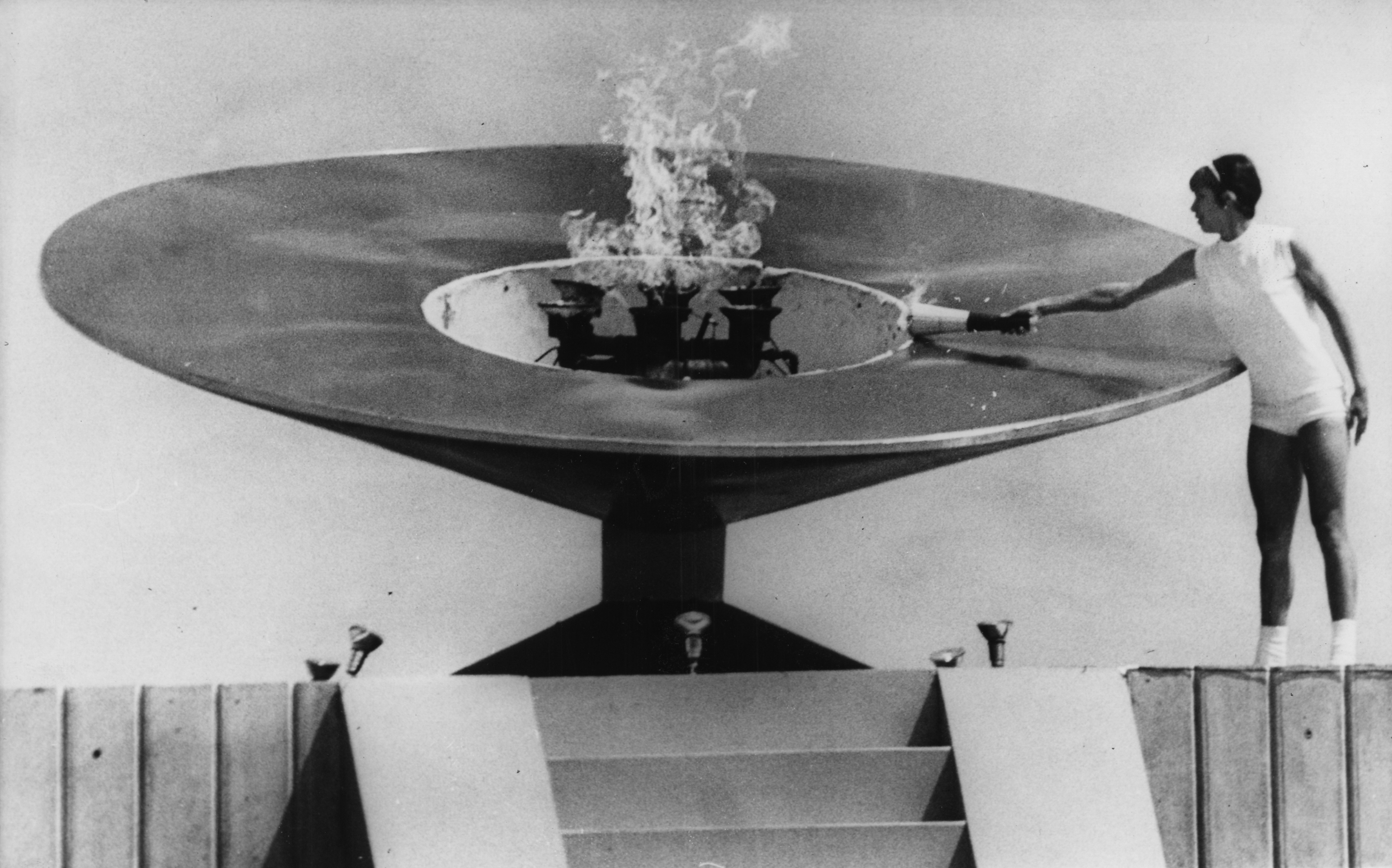
October 12, 1968: Enriqueta Basilio lights Olympic cauldron

- The opening ceremony of the Games of the XIX Olympiad took place in Mexico City. Although still referred to as the 1968 Summer Olympics, the games were the second in a row to be held in the autumn.
- Equatorial Guinea was granted independence from Spain, becoming Africa's 38th country to become an independent nation since World War II and bringing an end to 182 years of colonial rule. President-elect Francisco Macías Nguema and Spanish Minister of Information and Tourism Manuel Fraga Iribarne signed a document of transfer in the new nation's capital, Santa Isabel (now called Malabo), the flag of Spain was lowered and the new flag was raised above the recently built government building. In spite of a positive start to his presidency, Macías assumed dictatorial power within less than five months and then begin a reign of terror that oversaw the deaths of as much as one-fifth of the population of 400,000. The presidency of Macias lasted until August 3, 1979, when he was overthrown and then executed in a coup led by his nephew, Teodoro Obiang Nguema Mbasogo, who was still president in 2018.
- Born: Hugh Jackman, Australian film and stage actor, known popularly for his portrayal of Wolverine in nine feature films of X-Men; in Sydney

== October 13, 1968 (Sunday) ==
- The new Michigan International Speedway, located a few miles south of the small town of Brooklyn, Michigan, held its first auto race, the Michigan 250, near the end of the 1968 USAC Championship Car season. Ronnie Bucknum got the checkered flag for his first and only victory.
- Died:
  - Bea Benaderet, 62, American comedian, radio and television actress, known as the star of the rural sitcom Petticoat Junction, died from lung cancer" Benaderet had filmed the first five episodes of the 1968–69 season before her illness forced her to step down. Benaderet had also voiced the role of "Betty Rubble" on the TV show The Flintstones.
  - John L. Hines, 100, U.S. Army General and World War I hero
  - Hossein Behzad, 74, Iranian painter

== October 14, 1968 (Monday) ==
- At the Olympics in Mexico City, U.S. track and field athlete Jim Hines became the first person recognized as running the 100 meters race in less than 10 seconds, setting a new world record of 9.95 seconds.
- The United States Department of Defense announced that the United States Army and United States Marines were sending about 24,000 troops back to South Vietnam for second tours of duty in the ongoing Vietnam War.
- Guards at a prison farm in Cummins, Arkansas fired into a crowd of about 70 inmates who had refused to go to work in the fields until their demands were met, wounding 24 of them.

== October 15, 1968 (Tuesday) ==
- Liu Shaoqi, the President of China and one of the first victims of China's Cultural Revolution, was officially stripped of all of his powers, almost two years after he had last been seen in public. An editorial in the party newspaper Red Flag was read aloud over Peking Radio, and referred to Liu only by an epithet. "We have completely disposed of the anti-revolutionary elements, led by China's Khrushchev, into the wastebasket of history," an announcer quoted, "and he no longer has power and authority in the Party and government. The declaration of proletarian victory is therefore not just a claim, but a fact."
- The United States Supreme Court issued its first ruling of its new term, holding in a 6-to-3 decision that the state of Ohio had to, as the other 49 states had done, include third-party candidate George C. Wallace on its ballots for the November 5 U.S. presidential election, and in the longer term, ruling that states could not impose burdensome regulations on minor parties without compelling reasons. An Ohio law, requiring third-party presidential candidates to have a primary election, a convention, and a petition with "signatures amounting in number to at least 15% of the vote in the last statewide election" was not applied to the Republican and Democratic parties, and the Court concluded that Wallace had been denied equal protection under the 14th Amendment.
- The Kingdom of Bhutan, located in the Himalayan Mountains, inaugurated its first ever airport. The facility, financed and built by neighboring India and located in the small city of Paro, was opened by India's Deputy Prime Minister, Morarji Desai.
- 20-year-old American mountain climber Jim Madsen fell 3,000 feet (910 m) to his death from El Capitan in Yosemite National Park while attempting to come to the aid of two friends who were temporarily stranded on the wall.
- Born:
  - Didier Deschamps, French national soccer football team midfielder from 1989 to 2000, and manager of the France national team since 2012; in Bayonne, Pyrénées-Atlantiques département
  - Jyrki 69 (stage name for Jyrki Pekka Emil Linnankivi), Finnish singer who is the lead vocalist of the gothic rock band The 69 Eyes; in Helsinki

== October 16, 1968 (Wednesday) ==
- In Mexico City, African-American athletes Tommie Smith and John Carlos raised their fists in a black power salute at medal ceremony after winning, respectively, the gold and bronze in the Olympic men's 200 meter race. After refusing to apologize, the two men were expelled from the team and sent home. The third man on the platform, white Australian silver medalist Peter Norman, wore an Olympic Project for Human Rights (OPHR) badge to show solidarity with Smith and Carlos.
- The DSV Alvin, a deep-submergence vehicle which would later explore the wreckage of the RMS Titanic, sank to the bottom of the Atlantic Ocean while preparing for a routine inspection dive about 90 miles (140 km) southeast of Cape Cod. Lifting lines from the ship's tender Lulu had broken and the Alvin, which still had its hatch open as it prepared to take on a crew, plunged 5,051 feet (1,540 m) before hitting the ocean floor. The craft would finally be recovered on September 1, 1969.
- U.S. President Johnson held a telephone conference call simultaneously with all three of the major U.S. presidential candidates, to inform them that he had no plans to change the American bombing of North Vietnam. At the time, Richard Nixon was in Kansas City, Hubert Humphrey was in St. Louis, and George Wallace was in Los Angeles.
- Czechoslovakia's Prime Minister Oldřich Černík reluctantly signed his nation's treaty with the Soviet Union in Prague, officially recognizing the right for Warsaw Pact troops to occupy Czechoslovak territory. Appearing on behalf of the USSR was Soviet Premier Alexei Kosygin.
- The Jimi Hendrix Experience released their last studio album, Electric Ladyland. The album includes a cover of Bob Dylan's All Along the Watchtower, which became the band's best-selling single.

== October 17, 1968 (Thursday) ==
- Nancy Tuckerman, the press secretary for presidential widow Jacqueline Kennedy, announced that the former First Lady had departed on a charter flight from New York's John F. Kennedy International Airport on an Olympic Airways Boeing 707, to marry one of the world's wealthiest men, shipping company owner Aristotle Onassis, the following week. The announcement came less than a week after the U.S. Senate had voted "to provide Mrs. Kennedy with Secret Service protection until her death or until she remarries."
- Bullitt, the iconic Steve McQueen action film that featured what has been called "the most famous car chase in cinematic history", premiered at New York City's Radio City Music Hall and became a critical and box office success.
- Born: Ziggy Marley (David Nesta Marley), Jamaican reggae musician; in Kingston
- Died: Harun Thohir and Usman Haji Muhammad Ali, both 25, two Indonesian Marine Corps operatives who had carried out the March 10, 1965 MacDonald House bombing that injured 36 people in Singapore, three of them fatally, were hanged.

== October 18, 1968 (Friday) ==
- African-American athlete Bob Beamon broke the world record for the long jump by more than half a meter (55 cm) and almost two feet 55 cm (21 3/4 in) at the 1968 Summer Olympics in Mexico City. His record stood for 23 years, and is still the second longest jump in history.
- John Lennon was taken by London police to the Paddington Green police station on charges of possession of cannabis and obstructing a police search, in "the first arrest of a member of the Beatles, the most successful entertainers in the history of British show business". He and Yoko Ono were arrested at Lennon's apartment in the Marylebone district, and were released after posting bond to secure their appearance the next day in court.
- Died: Lee Tracy, 70, American film actor "whose machinegun delivery typified the breezy spirit of the talkies when sound came to the movies"; from advanced liver cancer

== October 19, 1968 (Saturday) ==
- Frustrated by the collapse of attempts to find a new Prime Minister, Charles Helou sought to resign his post as the President of Lebanon, but was unable to locate the Speaker of Parliament in Beirut in order to present the necessary papers. The next day, parliamentary leaders and the presidents of Lebanon's three major trade union federations conferred with Helou and talked him out of resigning. The crisis ended when former Prime Ministers Abdullah Yafi and Hussein Oweini (both Sunni Muslims) and two Maronite Christian members of Parliament, Raymond Edde and Pierre Gemayal, agreed to form a four-member cabinet, led by Yafi (whose resignation on October 9 had created the chaos). The four ministers handled all the tasks of the 16 ministries of the government.

== October 20, 1968 (Sunday) ==
- Less than five years after the assassination of her husband, former U.S. First Lady Jacqueline Kennedy married Greek shipping tycoon Aristotle Onassis in a ceremony on the Greek island of Skorpios. In doing so, she forfeited $200,000 per year of financial support from the Kennedy family (part of a pre-nuptial agreement with John F. Kennedy) and a $10,000 widow's pension from the U.S. government. Onassis provided her $3,000,000 and set up trusts of one million dollars apiece for Caroline Kennedy and John Kennedy Jr.; the marriage lasted until the death of Onassis on March 15, 1975.
- American athlete Dick Fosbury broke the Olympics record for the high jump and introduced the world to his unorthodox technique of twisting his body and going over the bar upside down and head first, reaching 7 ft 4½ inches. The "Fosbury Flop" became the standard for high jumping.

== October 21, 1968 (Monday) ==
- The busiest railway station in Japan, Tokyo's Shinjuku station, was taken over at 9:00 at night by thousands of anti-war protesters. The Japanese Beheiren group had arranged simultaneous rallies in 270 locations throughout the station. An estimated 60,000 commuters were at Shinjuku, unable to leave while rioters broke windows, tore up the interiors of train cars, and trashed the station. Tokyo riot police finally dispersed the crowd in and around the station after midnight, using fire hoses and tear gas.

== October 22, 1968 (Tuesday) ==
- In an act that would not become public until 48 years later, Republican presidential candidate Richard M. Nixon telephoned his closest aide (and future Chief of Staff) H. R. Haldeman, and ordered him to get intermediaries to persuade South Vietnamese President Nguyen Van Thieu to refuse to participate in the Paris Peace Talks to end the Vietnam War. Haldeman's handwritten notes of the conversation referred to Anna Chennault, who had connections with other people who knew Thieu, and included the entry "VN— keep Anna Chennault working on SVN"; the second page of notes were "re V.N. bomb halt news" and Haldeman's summary, "any other way to monkey wrench it? Anything RN can do." In 1977, Nixon denied that he had any knowledge of Chennault's contact with the Thieu government as rumors of "the Chennault affair" circulated, but in 2007, the Nixon presidential library opened the Haldeman notes to researchers, and historian John A. Farrell would discover the note in 2016. Whether Thieu would have derailed the talks anyway, without Nixon's efforts, efforts by private citizens to "defeat the measures of United States" were a federal crime. By 1968, the Vietnam War had claimed more than 30,000 American lives, and 58,220 died by the time the war ended.
- Apollo 7, the first American space mission where the entire crew had the common cold, ended its 11-day mission with a descent made worse by painful pressure in the astronauts ears and sinuses. With the crew having proven the success of the maneuvers necessary for releasing and then redocking between an orbiting ship and the crewed lunar module, the capsule safely landed in the Atlantic Ocean north of Puerto Rico at 8:12 in the morning local time and was picked up by the aircraft carrier USS Essex. The Essex was closely followed by a Soviet Navy intelligence ship, the Ekholog, which in turn was constantly observed by a U.S. Navy helicopter hovering overhead.
- The pornographic film Vixen!, the first American film to have an X rating under the new classification system of the MPAA, was released nationwide. Director Russ Meyer voluntarily gave his film an X rating, limiting the film to adults only, 17 days before the MPAA system of ratings was introduced. Erica Gavin appeared as the nymphomaniac title character.
- The Gun Control Act of 1968 was signed into law by U.S. President Johnson.
- Born: Shaggy (stage name for Orville Richard Burrell), Jamaican-born American reggae singer; in Kingston

== October 23, 1968 (Wednesday) ==
- INS Nilgiri, the first warship of the Indian Navy to be constructed in India, was launched into the Arabian Sea from the Mazagon dock in Bombay (now Mumbai); the Nilgiri was commissioned on June 3, 1972. Prime Minister Indira Gandhi christened the ship by "breaking a coconut against the hull of the Leander instead of a bottle of champagne in the western manner."

== October 24, 1968 (Thursday) ==
- Starting at 3:08 in the morning local time, military and civilian personnel of North Dakota's Minot Air Force Base reported an unidentified flying object. According to a report filed with the U.S. Air Force's Project Blue Book, an employee charged with servicing the Minot AFB's missiles was the first to describe "a bright orangeish-red object", followed by the crew of a B-52 bomber had spotted the object on its radar and then had a visual sighting. According to the Air Force summary, "Fourteen other people in separate locations also reported sighting a similar object".
- The 199th and last mission of the fastest airplane in history, the X-15 rocket plane, was completed by NASA test pilot William H. Dana, who landed at California's Vandenberg Air Force Base at 10:14 a.m. local time, a little more than 11 minutes after the X-15 was launched from a B-52. During his flight, on re-entry, Dana reached a maximum speed of Mach 5.38, or 3,716 miles per hour (5,980 km/h).

== October 25, 1968 (Friday) ==
- Formerly The New Yardbirds, Led Zeppelin gave its first live concert under its new name, performing at Surrey University in England. Jimmy Page remained as lead guitar, but reorganized the Yardbirds with Robert Plant taking the place of Keith Relf, bassist John Paul Jones (John Richard Baldwin) coming in for Chris Dreja, and drummer John Bonham replacing Jim McCarty. The new band name was a variation of the slang term of "a lead balloon" as any unsuccessful venture, and was based on Page's recollection of a joke by Keith Moon of The Who that a duo of Moon and Page would "go down like a 'lead zeppelin'". In order to avoid confusion between the different pronunciations of "lead" (the verb lead and the dense substance lead), the spelling was altered to "led".
- Northeast Airlines Flight 946 crashed into a heavily wooded mountainside while descending through fog toward the regional airport at Lebanon, New Hampshire, killing 32 of the 42 people on board. The Fairchild F-27 turboprop had departed Boston at 5:42 p.m. on its scheduled multi-stop flight to Montpelier, Vermont, and was cleared to descend to 2,800 feet by the Lebanon air traffic controller. Instead of leveling off at the prescribed altitude, the crew continued the descent and struck the 2,294-foot (699 m) Moose Mountain at an altitude of 2,237 feet (682 m).
- Born: David McCormack, Australian musician, singer-songwriter, and actor; in South Brisbane, Queensland

== October 26, 1968 (Saturday) ==
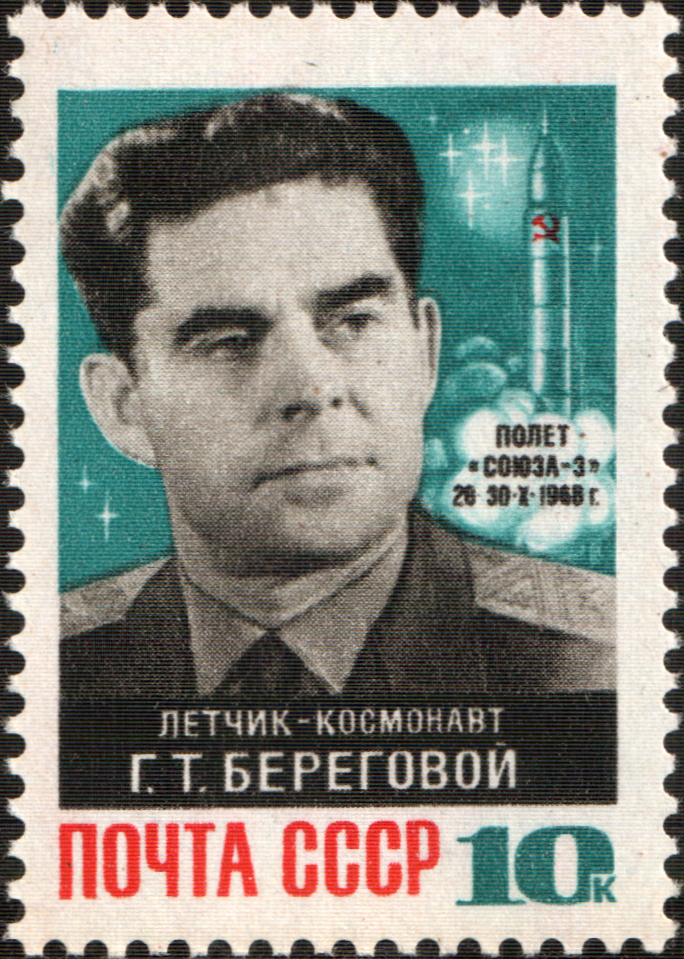
G. T. Beregovoi

- Soviet cosmonaut Georgi Beregovoi, 47, became the oldest person up to that time to be launched into outer space, as the USSR sent up Soyuz 3, its first crewed space mission since the program had been halted by the April 24, 1967 death of Vladimir Komarov. Beregovoi was rumored to be on a mission to go into lunar orbit. Instead, Beregovoi remained in Earth orbit and performed a rendezvous (but not a docking) with the uncrewed Soyuz 2 spacecraft. After 61 orbits, Soyuz 3 returned safely to Earth on October 30. After the collapse of the Soviet Union in 1989, the Soyuz program released records showing that Beregovoi had failed in the docking attempt because he "had been trying to dock with Soyuz 2 while flying Soyuz 3 upside down" and "had to be 'rescued' by ground control from his precarious predicament", after which further attempts were canceled.

== October 27, 1968 (Sunday) ==
- The 1968 Summer Olympics closed in Mexico City. One reporter noted that "The problem games, as they came to be known, had been brought off successfully— more successfully in fact, than by any other host," and added, "Competitively, this has been the greatest Olympics in history. Incredible feats have necessitated practically rewriting the entire amateur record book," with 20 world records broken. In all, 7,600 athletes from 112 nations participated. The United States won the most medals (45 gold, 107 overall) with the Soviet Union in second place (29 gold, 91 in all).
- For the first time in more than 20 years, Great Britain remained on British Summer Time rather than moving clocks back an hour on the last Sunday of October and staying on Central European Time (CET). In that Britain was at the westernmost portion of the CET zone, sunrise would be after 9:00 in the morning in December. With time being moved back an hour in the United States, London was six hours ahead of New York.
- In the largest anti-American protest in British history, a crowd of 30,000 demonstrators marched through London near the U.S. Embassy.
- Died: Lise Meitner, 89, Austrian physicist and co-discoverer, with Otto Hahn, of the process of nuclear fission in uranium; she was denied the Nobel Prize in Chemistry that went to Hahn for the discovery in 1944. In 1997, chemical element 109 meitnerium (Mt) was named in her honor.

== October 28, 1968 (Monday) ==
- On the 50th anniversary of Czechoslovakia's October 28, 1918, declaration of independence from Austria-Hungary, the Eastern European nation's National Assembly voted to restructure its government as "a socialist federation of two national states", the Czech Socialist Republic and the Slovak Socialist Republic, effective January 1, 1969. President Ludvik Svoboda signed the act into law on October 30 at the Bratislava Castle. A little more than 23 years later, the two states would peacefully separate into independent nations as the Czech Republic and the Republic of Slovakia.
- Thousands of Czechoslovak demonstrators marched through the streets of Prague for the first time since the August invasion, to protest the nation's continued occupation by 650,000 Soviet Union troops. The Soviets did not respond, and left it to Prague's police to arrest demonstrators trying to break through the cordon surrounding the Prague Castle at Hradčany Square.
- Born: Juan Orlando Hernández, President of Honduras from 2014 to 2022; in Gracias

== October 29, 1968 (Tuesday) ==
- Yusuf Zuayyin, considered a progressive member of the ruling Ba'ath Party, resigned as Prime Minister of Syria after 16 months in office. Syrian President Nureddin al-Atassi then assumed that office as well and formed a cabinet, and would perform both jobs until his overthrow on November 13, 1970. Atassi's 26-member cabinet included 14 military officers. Although state radio gave no reason for the president's acceptance of Zuayyin's resignation, observers in Lebanon theorized that the shakeup had been the result of a struggle within the Ba'ath Party between Syrian Air Force General Hafez al-Assad and Syria's most powerful man, Army General Salah Jadid, with hardliner Assad superseding Jadid's role as strongman.
- Born: Tsunku (Mitsuo Terada), Japanese record producer; in Higashiōsaka, Osaka Prefecture

== October 30, 1968 (Wednesday) ==
- A squad of 120 North Korean Army commandos invaded South Korea landed in boats along a 25 miles (40 km) section of the eastern coast of South Korea, between Samcheok and Uljin-gun and infiltrated the countryside on a mission to establish intelligence-gathering bases. Along the way, 23 civilians and 40 South Korean soldiers were killed by the invaders before 110 of the 120 North Koreans were killed and seven captured. Only three were able to escape back to the north.
- After a five-month search, a United States Navy ship located portions of the submarine USS Scorpion, which had disappeared on May 22. The oceanographic research ship Mizar had been among 40 ships and planes that had been searching the North Atlantic Ocean for traces of the lost sub, which was found at a depth of 10,000 feet (3,000 m) at a location 400 miles (640 km) southwest of the Azores.
- American physicist Luis W. Alvarez was announced as the winner of the Nobel Prize, for his discoveries in elementary particle physics, and Norwegian-born Yale professor Lars Onsager was awarded the Nobel Prize in Chemistry for his 1931 theories of theoretical thermodynamics.
- The crash of a chartered bus killed 38 people in South Korea, most of whom were on their way home from a funeral, and injured 40 more. The chartered bus ran off of a cliff and fell into the Nam River.
- Died:
  - Ramon Novarro, 69, American silent film star, was beaten to death in his home at 3110 Laurel Canyon Boulevard outside Los Angeles. Novarro was described in his obituary as the "last of the dashing Latin Lovers of the silent screen" and the star of the 1925 production of Ben-Hur. Brothers Paul Ferguson and Thomas Ferguson would be convicted of first degree murder on September 17, 1969.
  - Malcolm Hale, 27, American musician for the rock group Spanky and Our Gang, died of bronchial pneumonia at his home in Chicago. In later years, the legend would circulate that he died of carbon monoxide poisoning from a defective space heater.
  - U.S. Army Corporal James Van Howard, 21, son of country music singer Jan Howard and the subject of her song "My Son", released earlier and based on her letter to him for his safe return home from the war.
  - Pert Kelton, 61, American stage, film and television actress whose roles included "Mrs. Peroo" in The Music Man died of a heart attack.
  - Conrad Richter, 78, American novelist and short-story author

== October 31, 1968 (Thursday) ==
- Citing progress in the Paris Peace Talks, U.S. President Lyndon B. Johnson announced in a nationwide address that he had ordered a complete cessation of "all air, naval, and artillery bombardment of North Vietnam" effective at 9:00 p.m. local time on November 1. The announcement, which came five days before the U.S. presidential election, confirmed speculation that a major breakthrough had been made in negotiations between the United States and South Vietnam on one side, and North Vietnam and the Viet Cong on the other.
- The Condon Committee, a University of Colorado study group led by Professor Edward Condon, delivered its final report, Scientific Study of Unidentified Flying Objects, to the United States Air Force, which had funded the project. Condon's summary was "Our general conclusion is that nothing has come from the study of UFOs in the past 21 years that has added to scientific knowledge. Careful consideration of the record as it is available to us leads us to conclude that further extensive study of UFOs probably cannot be justified in the expectation that science will be advanced thereby." The report would be published as a mass-market paperback in January.
- The Norway tanker MT Etnefjell caught fire in the North Atlantic Ocean, 350 nautical miles (650 km) southeast of Cape Farewell, Greenland. One man was killed, and 29 of the other 32 crewmen evacuated the Etnefjell, rowing away in a pair of lifeboats, while the master, chief mate and first engineer remained behind. After four days adrift, the three officers were rescued by the U.S. Coast Guard Cutter USCGC Absecon; the 29 who had escaped to apparent safety, however, were never located and were presumed to have gone down with their boats during a storm.
- Democrat presidential nominee Hubert Humphrey continued his rise in voter preference polls, narrowing the gap between him and Republican frontrunner Richard Nixon to just three percent in the latest Harris Poll, based on surveys taken of 1,675 likely voters on October 27 and 28. Polling showed Nixon with 40% approval, Humphrey with 37%, George Wallace with 16% and 7% undecided.
- Great Drought of 1968: Amidst a collapse of hydropower President of Chile Eduardo Frei Montalva decrees the establishment of daylight saving time.
