= Riessler =

Riessler or Rießler is a surname. Notable people with the surname include:

- Paul Rießler (1865–1935), German biblical scholar
- Michael Riessler (born 1957), German composer
- Michael Rießler (born 1971), linguist
