= November 1968 =

Month of 1968

| << | November 1968 | | | | | >> |
| Su | Mo | Tu | We | Th | Fr | Sa |
| | | | | | 1 | 2 |
| 3 | 4 | 5 | 6 | 7 | 8 | 9 |
| 10 | 11 | 12 | 13 | 14 | 15 | 16 |
| 17 | 18 | 19 | 20 | 21 | 22 | 23 |
| 24 | 25 | 26 | 27 | 28 | 29 | 30 |

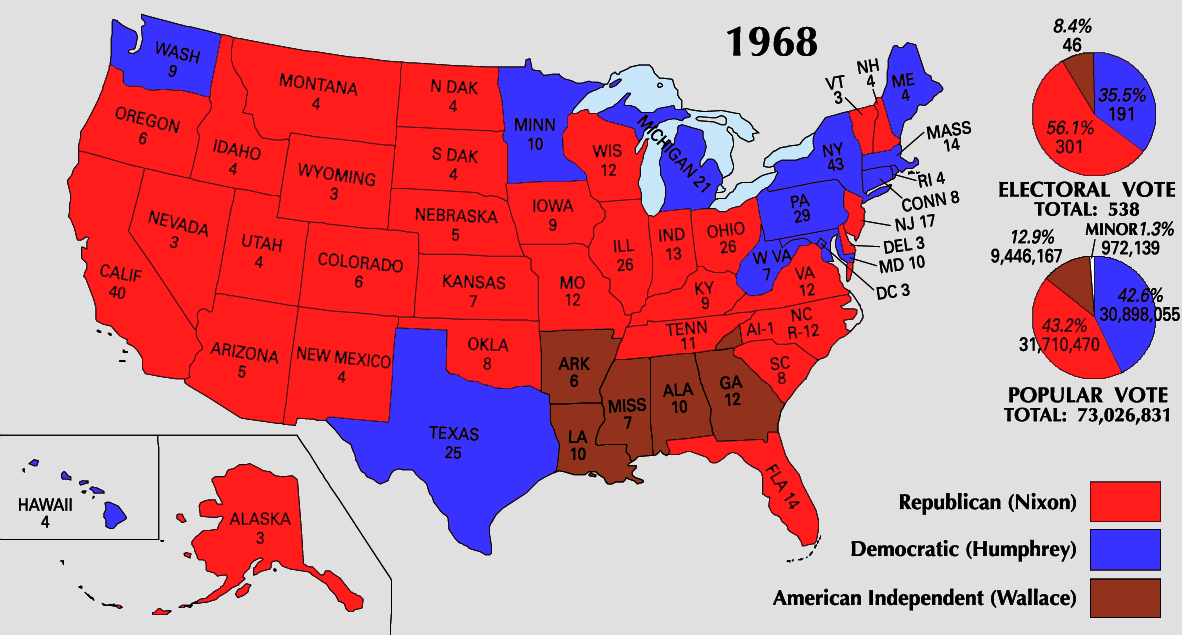
November 5, 1968: Republican Richard Nixon wins U.S. presidential election

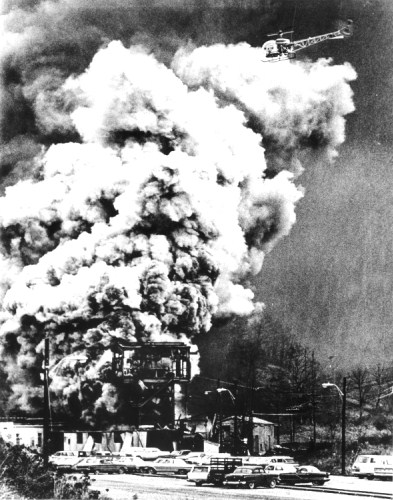
November 20, 1968: 78 coal miners entombed in U.S. coal mine explosion

The following events occurred in November 1968:

== November 1, 1968 (Friday) ==
- The bombardment of North Vietnam by the United States halted at 9:00 in the evening local time as airplanes stopped flying missions, ships stopped firing shells and ground units near the border halted artillery fire.
- Heavy rains in north Italy began, causing flash flooding of the Toce River and its streams and killing 61 people in Valle Mosso. Another 12 were found in the surrounding Province of Biella within its first day.
- The MPAA's new rating system went into effect, with films branded "G", "M", "R" or "X". "M" (for mature audiences) later became "PG" (parental guidance suggested).
- Born: Silvio Fauner, Italian cross-country skier and 1995 world champion in the 50 km race; in San Pietro di Cadore
- Died: Georgios Papandreou, 80, Prime Minister of Greece from 1944 to 1945, 1963 and 1964 to 1965 died shortly after being released from house arrest, and the day after surgery for a perforated ulcer.

== November 2, 1968 (Saturday) ==
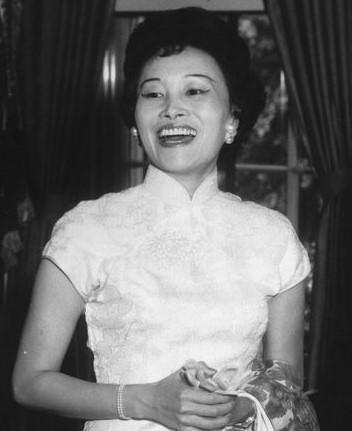
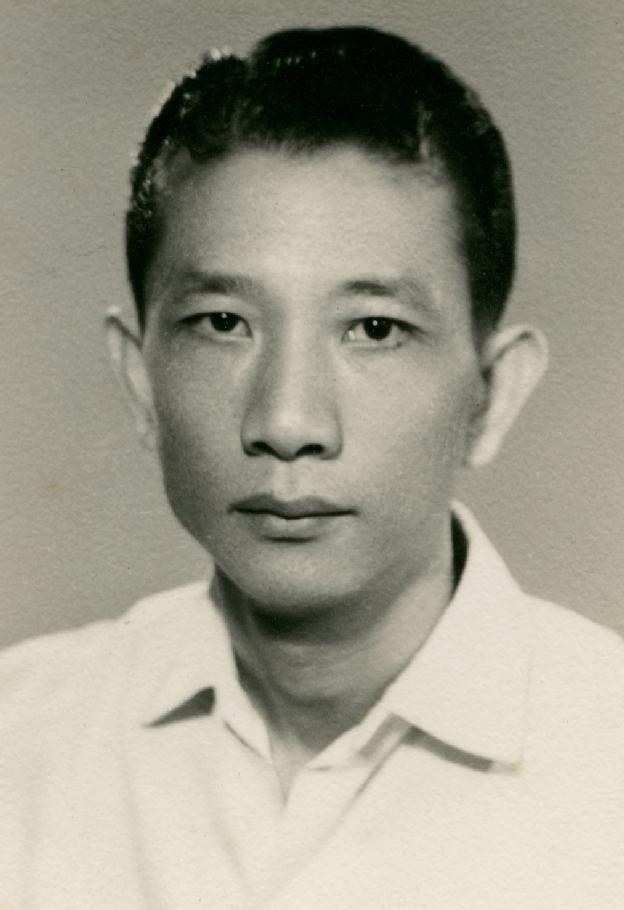
Anna Chennault and Ambassador Diem
- An FBI document of a conversation between two Nixon campaign workers, future Attorney General John Mitchell and Asian-American lobbyist Anna Chennault confirmed her discussion that she had contacted South Vietnam ambassador to the U.S. Bui Diem to confirm that South Vietnam would avoid participating in the Paris Peace Talks. An author would later describe this as Chennault and Mitchell "conducting a private foreign policy", a violation of United States law.
- South Vietnam's President Nguyen Van Thieu derailed what appeared to be the beginning of the end of U.S. involvement in the Vietnam War by announcing "a wildly cheering session of the National Assembly" that South Vietnam would refuse to participate in the Paris Peace Talks agreed to by the United States, North Vietnam and the Viet Cong. "The Republic of Vietnam government is very sorry that such conditions for direct and serious talks between us and Hanoi," Thieu told legislators, "have not yet come about. And therefore, the Republic of Vietnam cannot participate in the present Paris conference." At the same time, North Vietnamese negotiators in Paris said that it was up to the United States to guarantee that South Vietnam would join the peace talks.

== November 3, 1968 (Sunday) ==
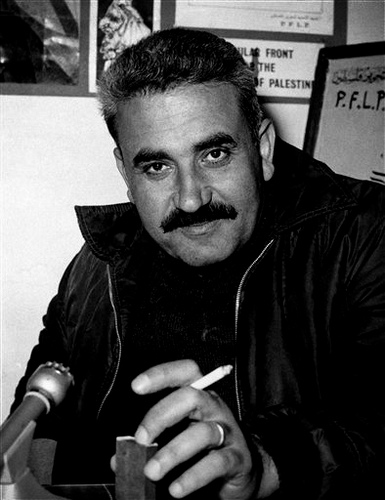
Habash

- The Popular Front for the Liberation of Palestine (PFLP) engineered the successful escape of founder George Habash from a prison in Syria, along with two other PFLP leaders, Faiz Qaddura and Ali Bushnaq. All three had been arrested on March 19, and PFLP efforts to have them released by diplomatic means had failed.
- Born: Debbie Rochon, Canadian horror film actress; in Vancouver

== November 4, 1968 (Monday) ==
- The federal government of Yugoslavia made a compromise with the Albanian-speaking Kosovan minority (residing in its socialist republic of the Serbian SR) to change the name of the Serbian province from "The Autonomous Province of Kosovo and Metohija" to "the Socialist Autonomous Province of Kosovo", eliminating the reference to the western portion and allowing the population "wide use" of a flag incorporating the double-headed eagle symbol of the Albanian people.
- Born:
  - Lee Germon, New Zealand cricketer and wicket-keeper; in Christchurch
  - Miles Long, American pornographic film director; in San Francisco
  - Daniel Landa, Czech punk rock musician; in Prague
- Died: Vern Stephens, 48, American baseball shortstop and 1945 American League home run leader, died of a heart attack.

== November 5, 1968 (Tuesday) ==
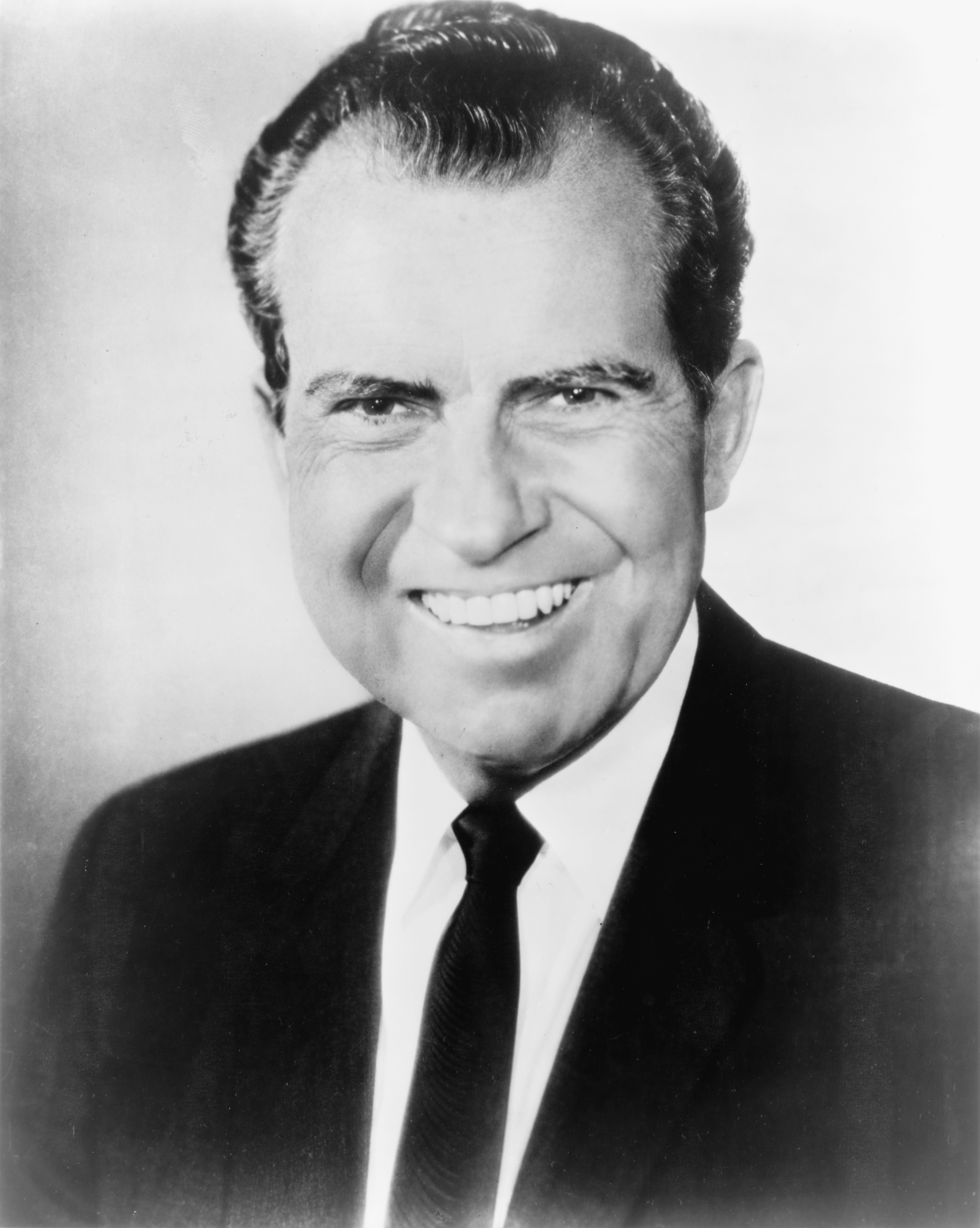
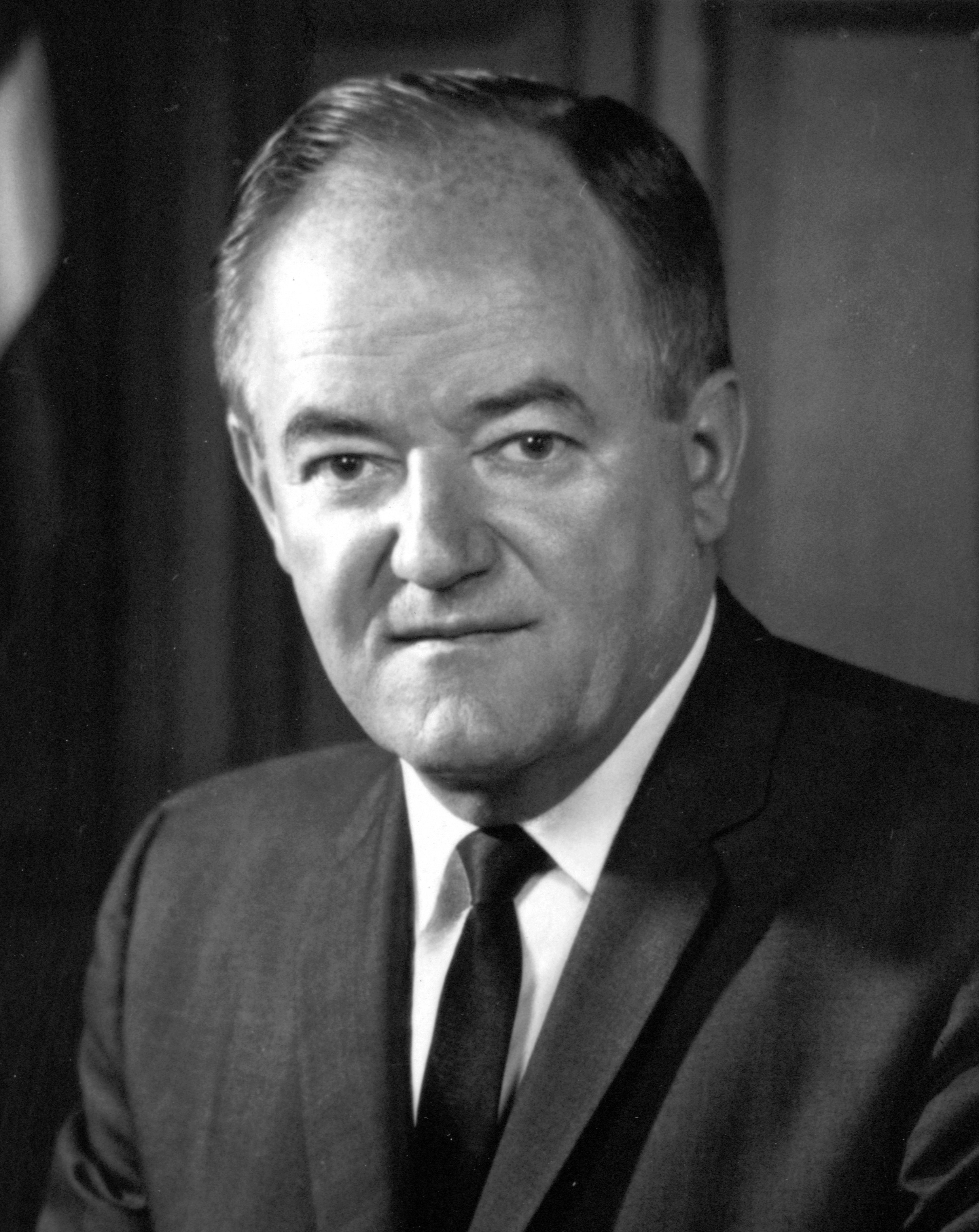
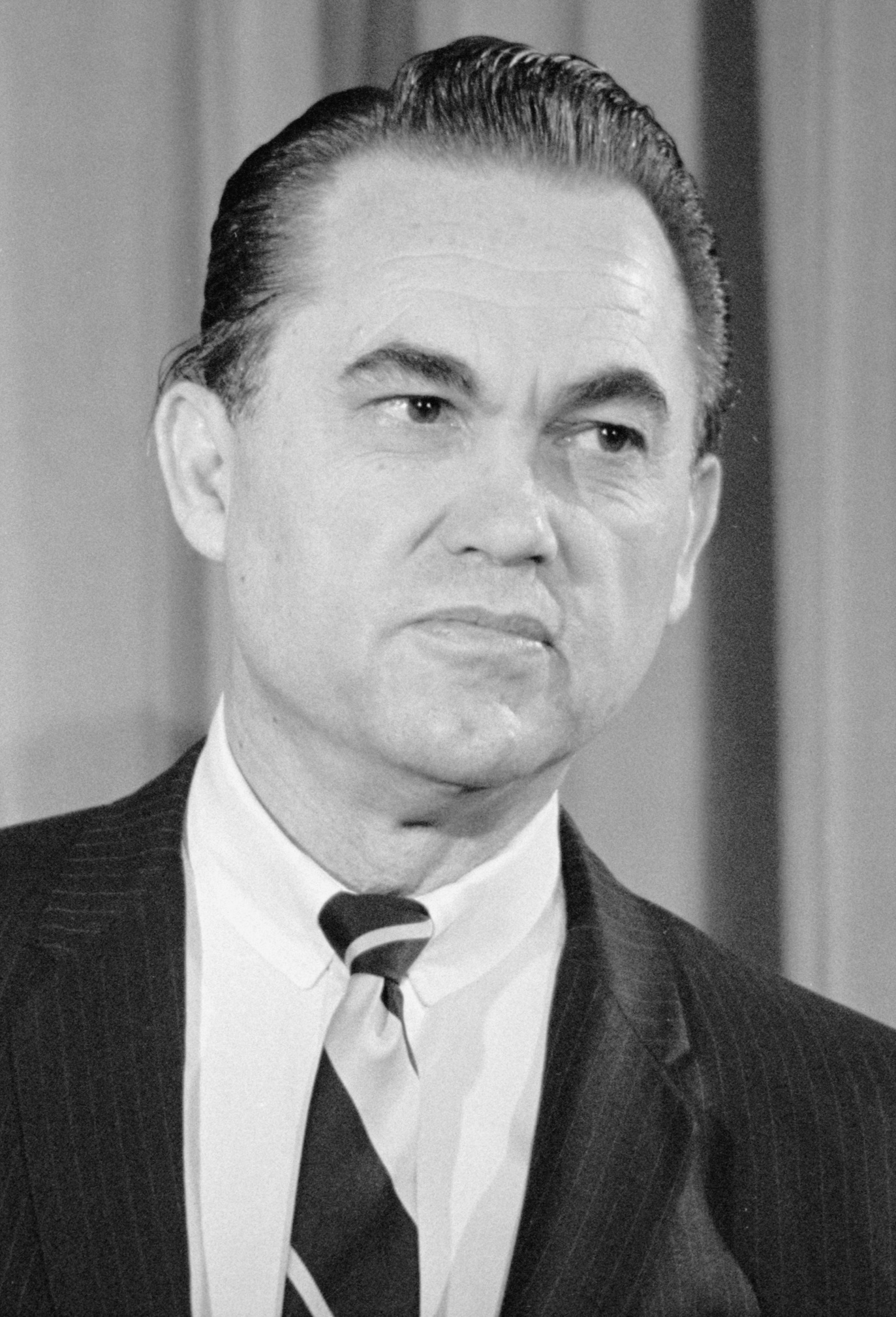
Nixon (Republican), Humphrey (Democrat), Wallace (American Independent)
- Former U.S. vice-president and Republican Party nominee Richard M. Nixon was elected President of the United States, defeating incumbent vice-president and Democrat Hubert H. Humphrey, and American Independent Party candidate George C. Wallace. Although the popular vote was close, with Nixon winning 31,783,783 votes and Humphrey 31,271,839 the electoral vote (301 to 191) ultimately would not be. Whether Nixon would be the winner, or whether no party would have a majority and cause the election to be decided by the House of Representatives, would remain in doubt until almost noon the next day. With four states (and 66 electoral votes) remaining in doubt, Nixon had 261 of the 270 needed to win, Humphrey had 166 and Wallace had 45 while the media waited for Chicago Mayor Daley to release the results of the tabulation there, which would determine who won Illinois and its 26 votes. If Humphrey had carried all four states, no candidate would have had 270 (Nixon 261, Humphrey 224 and Wallace 45). Humphrey, speaking from Minneapolis, conceded defeat in the U.S. presidential election shortly after 11:00 in the morning local time and telephoned his congratulations to the President-Elect.
- The Paris Peace Talks, scheduled to have begun on Wednesday, were called off less than 24 hours before they were to open, after the Viet Cong negotiator, Nguyen Thi Binh, said at her press conference that the group had a series of demands before it would negotiate, and the conditions were unacceptable to South Vietnam.
- Shirley Chisholm of Brooklyn, New York became the first African-American woman to be elected to the United States Congress, defeating the heavily favored James Farmer, a black candidate for New York's Liberal Party and the former national director of the Congress of Racial Equality (CORE).
- Luis A. Ferré was elected Governor of Puerto Rico, defeating incumbent governor Roberto Sánchez Vilella and becoming the first governor to have won on a platform seeking statehood for Puerto Rico.
- Born:
  - Penny Wong, Malaysian-born Foreign Minister of Australia since 2022; in Kota Kinabalu, Malaysia
  - Sam Rockwell, American film, stage and TV actor; in Daly City, California
  - Aitana Sánchez-Gijón, Italian-born Spanish film actress; in Rome

== November 6, 1968 (Wednesday) ==
- The longest student strike in American history began at San Francisco State University, where the Black Student Union joined with a coalition of Asian-American students and white students who supported the cause of diversity in admissions and student curriculum. The strike, organized by the "Third World Liberation Front", would last more than four months until March 20, 1969.
- Born:
  - Jerry Yang, Taiwanese-American billionaire, internet entrepreneur, and co-founder (with David Filo) of Yahoo!; as Yang Chih-Yuan in Taipei
  - Kelly Rutherford, American television actress; as Kelly Rutherford Deane in Elizabethtown, Kentucky
- Died:
  - Charles Munch, 77, German Alsatian-born symphony conductor and former music director for the Boston Symphony Orchestra, was found dead in his suite at Hotel John Marshall in Richmond, Virginia. Munch was on a tour of North America with the Orchestre de Paris, and was scheduled to conduct a concert that evening.
  - U.S. Navy Admiral Charles B. McVay III, captain of the USS Indianapolis when it was torpedoed and sunk on July 30, 1945, committed suicide by shooting himself in the head. Captain McVay was the only U.S. Navy captain court-martialed for losing a ship sunk by an act of war, despite the fact that he was on a top secret mission delivering the first nuclear weapon used in war.

== November 7, 1968 (Thursday) ==
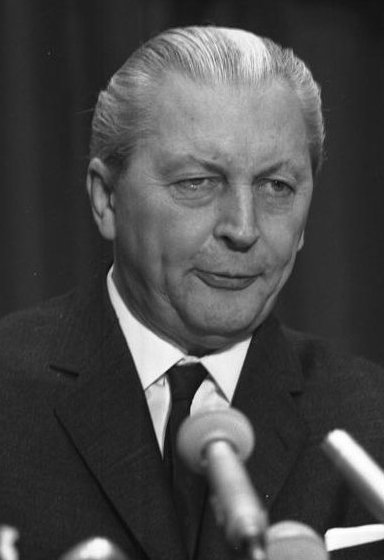
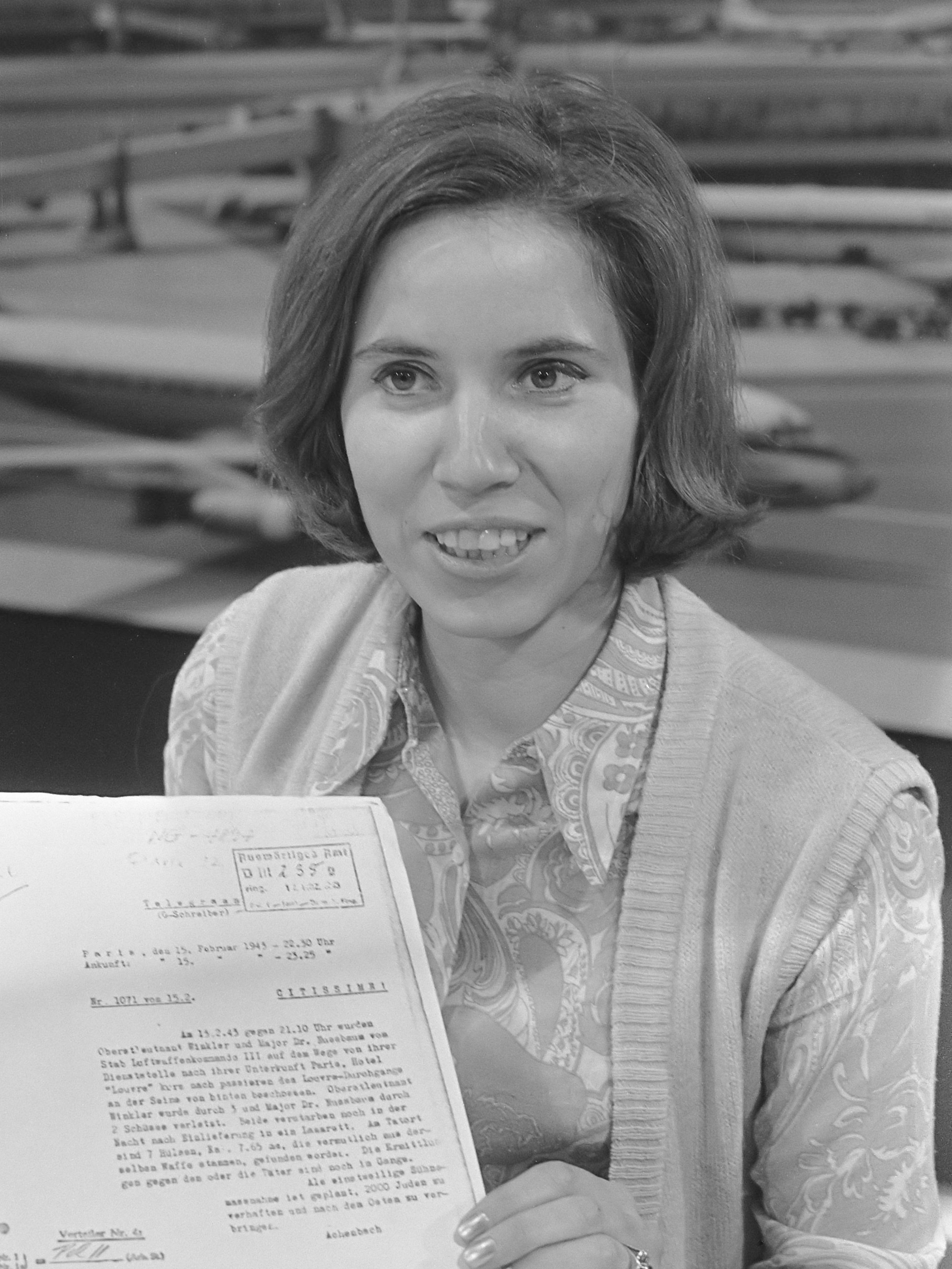
Chancellor Kiesinger and Journalist Klarsfeld
- French journalist Beate Klarsfeld assaulted West Germany's Chancellor Kurt Georg Kiesinger at a meeting of the Christian Democratic Union in West Berlin, approaching him on stage and slapping him in the face to bring worldwide attention to his Nazi past. Kiesinger, though not charged with war crimes after the fall of Nazi Germany, had been the deputy director of radio broadcasting for the Reich's Foreign Ministry during the war. Klarsfeld would receive a one-year prison sentence.
- Students in Pakistan marched in the streets of the capital, Rawalpindi, and in Dacca, the regional capital of East Pakistan (now Bangladesh) to demand the restoration of democracy and guarantees of freedom. Police opened fire on the Rawalpindi marchers, killing three of them, and the harsh response would lead to nationwide protests and members of the public participating along with students. Over a period of five months that would not end until the resignation of dictator Mohammad Ayub Khan on March 25, 1969, more than ten million people would participate in the protests, despite arrests and killings.
- Died: Gordon Coventry, 67, Australian rules football forward who was the first to kick 100 goals in a season; his career record of 1,299 career goals for Collingwood of the Victorian Football League would remain unbroken for 60 years until 1997.

== November 8, 1968 (Friday) ==
A standard "No Stopping" sign

- The Vienna Convention on Road Signs and Signals, an attempt to standardize traffic signs in the nations of Europe and in signatory nations in the rest of the world, opened for signature. The United States, China, Japan and Australia are not participants, but Russia, India, the United Kingdom, South Korea and Mexico are among those that are.
- Bruce Reynolds, the leader, and last of the 15 perpetrators, of the Great Train Robbery of August 8, 1963, was arrested after more than five years on the run. Reynolds had been traced by Scotland Yard to a seaside resort near Torquay. Reynolds and his family had recently returned to the United Kingdom after living lavishly in Mexico and France, partly out of his concern about how his associates were handling "his money"; detective Tommy Butler surprised Reynolds at the Torquay home, and Reynolds reportedly said, "I'm glad it's over. It's no life for anyone, always drifting about." Reynolds would serve seven years of a 25-year prison sentence before being paroled.
- The United States launched the Pioneer 9 satellite into orbit around the Sun on an "assignment as a robot interplanetary weatherman on the lookout for solar radiation storms hazardous to moon-bound astronauts." Pioneer 9 has the closest orbit of the series, coming within 112,000,000 kilometres (70,000,000 mi) of the Sun.
- The divorce between the Beatles' John Lennon and his first wife, Cynthia Lennon, became official, a little more than five months after Cynthia had returned to the couple's home at Weybridge, Surrey, and found that Yoko Ono had moved in. Lennon and Ono would marry a little more than four months later, on March 29.
- Born:
  - Zara Whites (stage name for Esther Kooiman), Dutch-born pornographic film actress and animal rights activist; in 's-Gravendeel
  - Parker Posey, American film actress; in Baltimore

== November 9, 1968 (Saturday) ==
- The most widely felt earthquake in United States history, noticed by millions of people in portions of 23 states, struck at 11:02 in the morning Central Time, with an epicenter in Hamilton County, Illinois, near the village of Broughton. Although the quake was only 5.4 magnitude and caused no fatalities, the tremors caused damage and injuries as far away as St. Louis and shaking in Chicago.
- Born: Nazzareno Carusi, Italian pianist; in Celano
- Died: Gerald Mohr, 54, American film, radio and television actor, died of a heart attack.

== November 10, 1968 (Sunday) ==
- The Soviet Union launched Zond 6, an unmanned lunar probe toward the Moon. When the high gain antenna and main star tracker system failed to deploy, ground control was able to use a backup system and guided the spacecraft in a flyby around the Moon on November 14 at an altitude of 2,420 kilometres (1,500 mi) and to photograph both sides of the Moon. An attempt to reorient the Zond 6 on its return to Earth resulted in the overheating of a seal and the depressurization of the craft cabin, killing all of the biological specimens inside and damaging the altimeter. Because of the damage, the altimeter malfunctioned and jettisoned the craft's parachute at the altitude of 5,300 metres (17,400 ft). Some film was recovered from the wreckage, including the first color pictures of the Moon.
- A family of three men from Yemen was arrested in New York City on charges of a conspiracy to assassinate President-elect Richard Nixon. The NYPD raided the Brooklyn apartment of Ahmad Rageh Namer and his two sons, Hussein and Abdo, after an informant said that the group had offered him a large amount of money to carry out the act because he was an expert marksman. At the apartment, police confiscated a carbine and a rifle, 24 rounds of ammunition, and three long knives. The three men were later acquitted of the conspiracy charge when their defense attorney made the case that the informant held a grudge against them and there was no other credible evidence to indicate that they had planned an assassination.
- Born:
  - Tracy Morgan, American comedian and television actor; in Brooklyn
  - Ishtar (stage name for Esther Zach), Israeli singer; in Kiryat Ata

== November 11, 1968 (Monday) ==
November 11, 1968: New Flag of Rhodesia adopted as the national flag of the country

- The new Flag of Rhodesia was raised by the white-minority government at Salisbury (now Harare, Zimbabwe). The Union Jack, flag of the United Kingdom, had been hauled down the afternoon before, marking the last time that a British colonial flag was flown in Africa.
- The Maldives, which had become fully independent as a sultanate on July 26, 1965, became a republic in accordance with the results of a referendum on the monarchy that had been conducted on April 1. Ibrahim Nasir was sworn in as President of the Maldives. During an eight-month period in 1953, when the set of Indian Ocean islands had been a British protectorate, Mohamed Amin Didi had chosen to be the President rather than to accept being a sultan.

== November 12, 1968 (Tuesday) ==
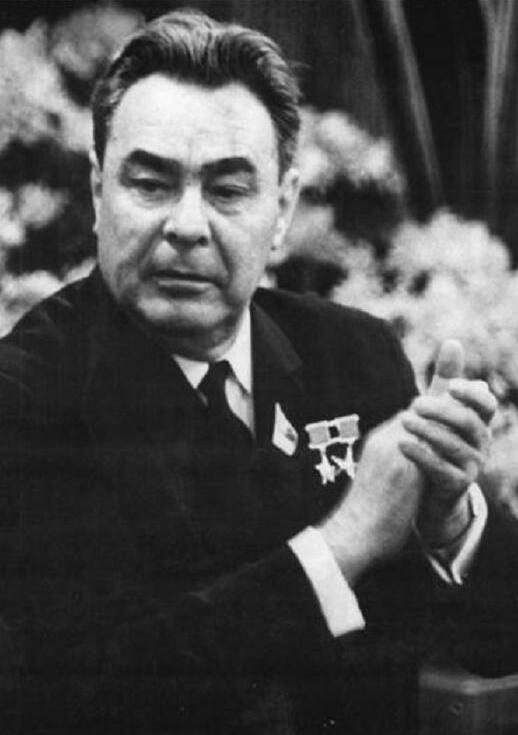
Brezhnev's Doctrine toward Eastern Europe
- The "Brezhnev Doctrine" was formally announced by Soviet Union Communist Party leader Leonid Brezhnev in a speech at the Congress of the Polish Workers' Party. Almost three months after the Warsaw Pact invasion of Czechoslovakia that brought an end to the reforms of the "Prague Spring", Brezhnev declared that "We emphatically oppose interference in the affairs of any states", but also adding that "When external and internal forces hostile to socialism try to turn the development of a given socialist country in the direction of the restoration of the capitalist system... when a threat arises to the cause of socialism in that country... this is no longer merely a problem for that country's people, but a common problem, the concern of all socialist countries."
- The U.S. Supreme Court issued its 9 to 0 ruling in Epperson v. Arkansas, invalidating a 1928 Arkansas statute that prohibited the teaching of human evolution, agreeing that it was a violation of the provision of the First Amendment to the U.S. Constitution against any "law respecting an establishment of religion, or prohibiting the free exercise thereof; or abridging the freedom of speech".
- NASA announced that it would launch three astronauts to be the first people ever to orbit the Moon, probably on December 21, for a six-day mission on Apollo 8.
- Born:
  - Sammy Sosa, Dominican Republic-born baseball player with 609 career home runs; as Samuel Peralta in San Pedro de Macorís
  - Kathleen Hanna, American musician known for "Bikini Kill" and "Le Tigre"; in Portland, Oregon

== November 13, 1968 (Wednesday) ==
- The Northrop HL-10 wingless aircraft, nicknamed "the flying flatiron", made its first successful rocket-powered flight, 21 days after the engines failed to ignite on the first powered test. The first 11 tests had been limited to gliding to test the craft's lift. NASA pilot John A. Manke guided the craft from 35,000 feet (11,000 m) to 43,250 feet (13,180 m) and reached a speed of up to 610 miles per hour (980 km/h) after the HL-10 had been dropped from a B-52 bomber.
- Robbie Irons of the St. Louis Blues set a record, since broken, for shortest National Hockey League career, tending goal for three minutes and one second in a game against the New York Rangers.
- Born: Pat Hentgen, American baseball pitcher and 1996 Cy Young Award winner; in Detroit

== November 14, 1968 (Thursday) ==
Yale

- Yale University announced that it would admit women students for the first time in its 267-year history, beginning with the 1969–70 academic year. The Yale Corporation (the university's board of trustees) had approved the proposal, made by university president Kingman Brewster, Jr., on November 9 and referred it to faculty for ratification. In the Thursday faculty meeting, the vote was 200 in favor, 1 against. Yale's sister institution, the formerly all-women Vassar College, began admitting male students for the same year.
- U.S. Marine PFC Francis Baldano was killed in South Vietnam while manning an ambush position in the Quang Tri Province, not by a combatant, but by a tiger that attacked him while he was lying in wait.
- Died: Ramón Menéndez Pidal, 99, Spanish philologist and scholar who holds the record for most times nominated for a Nobel Prize, on 23 different occasions between 1931 and 1966; however, he was never awarded the Nobel Prize in Literature.

== November 15, 1968 (Friday) ==
- A suspect was arrested in England's Cannock Chase murders, where four young girls (ranging in age from 5 to 10 years old) had been killed in Staffordshire since the summer of 1965. Detectives from Scotland Yard had been closing in on Raymond Leslie Morris, a factory foreman who lived in Walsall. On November 4, Morris had tried to pull another 10-year-old girl into his car; the girl escaped and an alert witness to the incident, Wendy Land, wrote down the car's license plate number, 492 LOP, which police traced to Morris. On February 18, 1969, Morris would be convicted of the rape and murder of 7-year old Christine Darby and would receive two life sentences. In 2014, he would pass away at the age of 83 while incarcerated at HMP Preston.
- German-born soldier of fortune Rolf Steiner, who had led several successful attacks against the Nigerian Army by Biafra's 4 Commando Brigade during the Nigerian Civil War, launched the disastrous "Operation Hiroshima", an attempt to drive Nigeria's 2nd Division out of Onitsha. Over the next two weeks, in what a military historian would describe as "a surprisingly ill-conceived, full frontal assault... across an open area without artillery, air or fire support". By the time the operation was abandoned on November 29, almost half of the 4 Commando Brigade was lost and Steiner was fortunate to have been deported, rather than executed, by the Biafran government.
- Operation Commando Hunt was initiated by the United States in the Vietnam War in an effort to disrupt the Ho Chi Minh trail that continued to bring North Vietnamese soldiers and supplies into South Vietnam. Despite the dropping of three million tons of bombs on the Trail over a period of 40 months, ending on March 31, 1972, the operation did little to slow the advance from North Vietnam, which shifted its supply lines westward into neighboring Laos and expanded the operation.
- Born:
  - Ol' Dirty Bastard (stage name for Russell Tyrone Jones), American rapper and co-founder of Wu-Tang Clan; in Brooklyn (died of drug overdose, 2004)
  - Fausto Brizzi, Italian film director, screenwriter and producer; in Rome

== November 16, 1968 (Saturday) ==
- The Politburo of the Polish United Workers' Party (Polska Zjednoczona Partia Robotnicza or PZPR), Poland's ruling Communist party that controlled the nation, concluded its Fifth Congress and re-elected Wladyslaw Gomulka to another term for its General Secretary. Three Politburo members were fired, including Foreign Minister Adam Rapacki, who had disagreed with the party's tough stance against student protesters, and former deputy foreign minister Marian Waszkowski. Replacing them were three hardliners.
- The Soviet Union launched the 17 ton (15.4 metric ton) Proton 4 satellite into orbit in what it described as "the world's biggest unmanned scientific spaceship" aboard a Zond rocket. In terms of weight lifted, rather than physical size, the American Saturn 5 rocket had been able to place a 264,055-pound (119,773 kg) satellite and a 100,400-pound (45,500 kg) model of the lunar module into orbit for a payload of more than 182 tons (165 metric tons).
- Died: Walter E. Headley, 63, Police Chief of Miami, Florida who became famous for his use of the phrase "when the looting starts, the shooting starts", died of a cardiac arrest the day after checking into a hospital for observation.

== November 17, 1968 (Sunday) ==
- What would become known as "The Heidi Game" in professional football history took place when the NBC television network abruptly halted its broadcast of an American Football League game between the Oakland Raiders and New York Jets, in order to telecast its scheduled Sunday night movie, Heidi. With 65 seconds left, Oakland had the ball and was trailing, 32 to 29 and television viewers nationwide were unable to see what happened next (Oakland scored two touchdowns to win the game, 43 to 32). The NBC network telephone switchboards were tied up with calls from angry viewers, followed by universal criticism of the network in the press the next day. Since then, American TV networks have delayed scheduled programming in order to show sporting events in their entirety. As for Heidi, the telecast was the top-rated television program of the week of November 11 to 17, with a 28.4 Nielsen rating and a 44 share.
- The new BAC One-Eleven jet airliner was introduced into commercial service with a flight by British European Airways.
- Born: Li Yanhong, also known as Robin Li, Chinese internet entrepreneur who created the search engine Baidu and became a multi-billionaire; in Yangquan, Shanxi province

== November 18, 1968 (Monday) ==
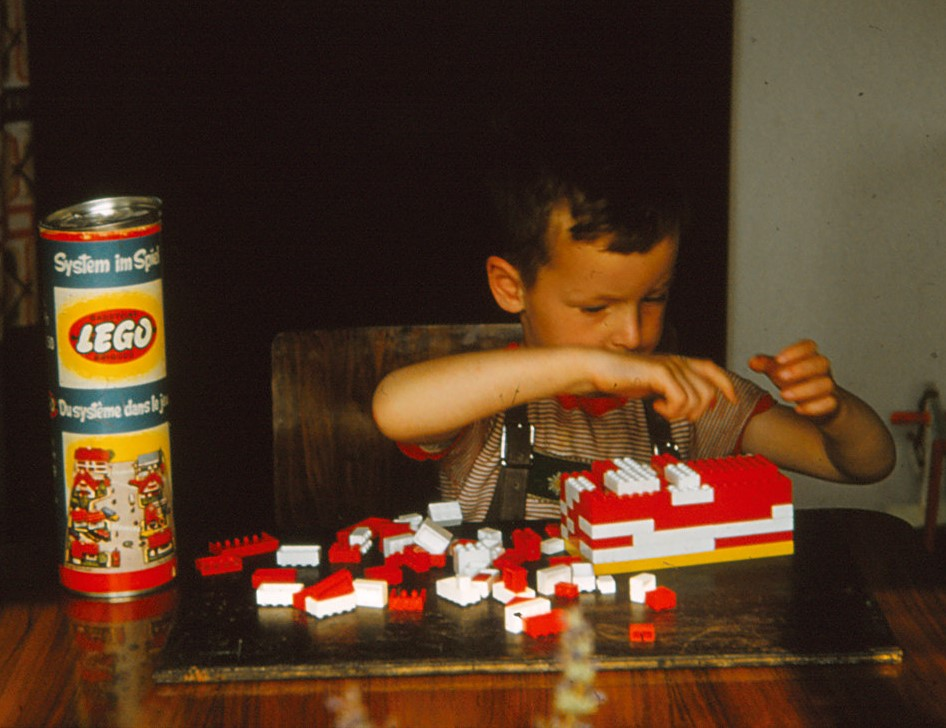
Lego bricks

- Interlego AG filed for the United States patent 3,597,875; for 17 years after the grant on August 10, 1971, the company had the exclusive right to manufacture the Lego blocks, categorized as "building blocks, strips, or similar building parts to be assembled without the use of additional elements provided with complementary holes, grooves, or protuberances, e.g. dovetails with primary projections fitting by friction in complementary spaces between secondary projections, e.g. sidewalls".
- The original expiration date for the 99-year concession by Egypt to the Suez Canal Company was dated from the signing of the agreement on November 17, 1869. However, 86 years after the concession was signed, Egypt's President Gamal Abdel Nasser nationalized the company on July 26, 1956, and paid the company's shareholders £28,000,000 compensation in seven installments.
- A fire killed 22 workers at the B. Stern Ltd upholstery factory on James Watt Street in Glasgow and only three people were able to escape to safety. People on the upper floors who were able to reach windows found their way blocked by iron bars.
- Born:
  - Gary Sheffield, American baseball outfielder with 509 home runs, 1992 National League batting champion; in Tampa
  - Owen Wilson, American film actor, screenwriter and producer; in Dallas
- Died: Walter Wanger, 74, American motion picture producer whose productions included Stagecoach in 1939 and Cleopatra in 1963

== November 19, 1968 (Tuesday) ==
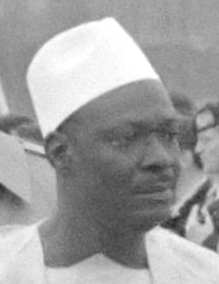
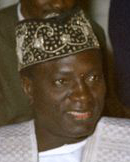
Lt. Traoré overthrows Mali's President Keita
- Mali Army Lieutenant Moussa Traoré led a bloodless military coup d'état to overthrow Modibo Keita and to become the new President of Mali. Traoré would begin transitioning Mali to civilian rule in 1979, but after widespread discontent, he would be overthrown on March 26, 1991. Keita would be imprisoned at Kidal until his death on May 16, 1977.
- Along with four other people, U.S. Army Chaplain Angelo J. "Charles" Liteky was presented with the Medal of Honor for his heroism in the Vietnam War. On December 6, 1967, when he evacuated 20 soldiers to safety despite enemy fire and wounds of his own. In 1986, he would become the first (and to date, only) Medal of Honor recipient to publicly renounce and return his medal, doing so in protest of American foreign policy.
- Died: Rang Avadhoot, 69, Indian Hindu poet and religious leader of the path of Dattatreya in the Gujarat state

== November 20, 1968 (Wednesday) ==
- Seventy-eight coal miners were killed in an explosion and subsequent carbon monoxide poisoning at the Consolidation Coal Company Number 9 mine at Mannington, West Virginia. The blast happened at 5:40 in the morning, when 99 men were inside, and 21 were able to get to safety. Attempts to rescue the 78 trapped inside were hindered by subsequent explosions and fires, and on November 30, further efforts ceased and the Number 9 mine was sealed, entombing the bodies of the miners. The disaster itself would be credited later as being something that "emotionally inspired" the Federal Coal Mine Health and Safety Act of 1969, including federal legislation to compensate coal miners for coalworker's pneumoconiosis (more commonly known as "black lung").
- A new speed record for an electric-powered car was set at the Bonneville Salt Flats in Utah when driver Jerry Kugel averaged 138.862 miles per hour (223.477 km/h) on a one-mile trip and on the return trip.
- Died:
  - Cathy Lewis, 51, American radio and TV actress best known for being Irma's friend and narrator in My Friend Irma, died from cancer.
  - Helen Gardner, 84, American silent film actress considered the movies' first vamp
  - Francis Lenn Taylor, 68, American art dealer and father of film actress Elizabeth Taylor

== November 21, 1968 (Thursday) ==
- The last gesture of open defiance by Czechoslovaks against the Soviet occupation ended peacefully at noon as tens of thousands of students in Prague brought a 76-hour sit-in to a close. The new Czechoslovak leadership— Gustav Husak, Lubomir Strougal and Oldrich Cernik— had decided to let the student strike run its course, rather than to crack down, and the strike leaders had voluntarily agreed to close the protest at a specified time. "There were no soldiers or policemen in sight at noon", Tad Szulc of The New York Times would write the next day, "as the self-disciplined students— the boys and girls— slowly and sadly took down the signs proclaiming the 'occupation strike' from the facade and doors of Prague University's Philosophy and Law buildings."
- An analysis was made of Apollo command and service module (CSM) modifications proposed for the Apollo Applications Program (AAP). The AAP spacecraft requirements and the subsequent subsystem modifications from the Apollo spacecraft resulted from the longer mission duration, increased mission support, docked attitude constraints, and cost and weight factors involved in AAP.
- Secondary school students in the Egyptian city of Mansoura rioted against new regulations that were intended to make it more difficult to be admitted to university education, and local police fired into the crowd. Four students died, and 55 others were wounded, and the violence in Mansoura led to a similar uprising in Alexandria.
- Born:
  - Mark Bailey, American writer, best known for his documentary films, including Last Days in Vietnam (2014) and Downfall: The Case Against Boeing (2022); in Elizabeth, New Jersey
  - Qiao Hong, member, and later coach, of China's women's national table tennis team; in Wuhan
  - Alex James, English musician and bassist for the rock band Blur; in Boscombe, Bournemouth

== November 22, 1968 (Friday) ==
- Under pressure from Britain, Prime Minister of Northern Ireland Terence O'Neill announced a series of five proposed reforms to respond to the problems raised by the Northern Ireland Civil Rights Association about discrimination against the Roman Catholic minority. The platform called for a 9-member Development Commission to administer Derry, an ombudsman to investigate complaints against the Northern Irish bureaucracy, the allocation of available housing based on need rather than on personal preference, the eventual abolition of the Special Powers Act that had been in place since the 1922 separation of Northern Ireland from the Republic of Ireland, and the end of the "company vote" that allowed business owners two votes in local elections (one as an individual, the other on behalf of the business). The reforms, however, would fail to be passed by the Stormont, Northern Ireland's parliament.
- A car bomb was exploded by terrorists in at the crowded Mahane Yehuda Market shopping district in the Jewish sector of Jerusalem, killing 11 people and injuring 55 others. Police estimated that 440 pounds (200 kg) of explosives had been placed inside a car parked outside a grocery store. The blast, the biggest terrorist attack against Israeli Jews since the modern nation's founding in 1948, set six adjacent stores on fire. Despite a house-to-house search for suspects and weapons over the next 35 hours, and the detention for questioning of over 500 people, the perpetrator was never determined.
- The supposed first-ever interracial kiss on national television in the U.S. was shown on an episode of Star Trek, with white actor William Shatner (Captain Kirk) kissing black actress Nichelle Nichols (Lieutenant Uhura) in "Plato's Stepchildren". The kiss attracted no notice in the media at the time. The accuracy of this claim is disputed.
- Japan Air Lines Flight 2 from Tokyo crashed into the San Francisco Bay while making its landing approach. Captain Kohei Asho was able to save the 97 passengers and the crew of 11 by landing in the water and directing everyone into rubber liferafts.
- The Beatles released what would become unofficially known as the White Album, although its official title was simply The Beatles, and it was a double album with two long-playing (LP) records.
- Born:
  - Rasmus Lerdorf, Greenland-born Canadian computer programmer and developer of the PHP scripting language; in Qeqertarsuaq, Disko Island, Denmark
  - Sidse Babett Knudsen, Denmark film and television actress; in Copenhagen

== November 23, 1968 (Saturday) ==
- A Cable Commuter Airlines turboprop plane crashed on the Newport Freeway (California SR 55, now called the Costa Mesa Freeway) as it was making its approach to the airport in Santa Ana, California at the end of a flight from Los Angeles, killing all seven passengers and two crew, without striking any of the cars on the highway. Descending through a fog, the DHC-6 Twin Otter struck a light pole, hit the highway's southbound lanes and then crossed a divider, skidding across the northbound traffic. Five automobiles avoided getting struck by the wreckage. "Incredible that it missed all those cars," a Santa Ana police sergeant told reporters later.
- Lynn Eusan was crowned as the homecoming queen for the University of Houston at halftime of its football game against the visiting University of Tulsa, becoming the first black student to be accorded that honor at any college or university in the Deep South region of the United States, and receiving more votes than five white finalists. Only seven years earlier, UH had been an all-white institution, not integrating until the 1962–63 academic year. In September 1971, Eusan would be found stabbed to death in a car driven by Leo Jackson Jr. He would be prosecuted for her murder, but ultimately acquitted.
- At the homecoming game, the Houston Cougars set a modern-day record for "running up the score" by beating the Tulsa Golden Hurricane, 100 to 6. A week before, UH had beaten the Idaho Vandals, 77–3.
- Died: Shangguan Yunzhu, 48, Chinese film actress, committed suicide after being persecuted during the Cultural Revolution

== November 24, 1968 (Sunday) ==
- A group of 374 civilians in Laos were killed in a U.S. attack that targeted the Tham Piu Cave in the Xiangkhouang Province, near Muang Kham, one of several large caverns in the area where families had taken refuge from American bombing missions. According to the Laotian accounts, two U.S. fighter jets fired missiles directly into the cave in the apparent belief that it was a hiding place for Viet Cong and Pathet Lao troops. The cave would later become a Buddhist shrine. Some of the victims were incinerated, others died when buried alive, but most died of starvation after being trapped inside.
- Out on bail and learning that his parole from a California prison had been revoked for a probation violation, black nationalist Eldridge Cleaver and his wife Kathleen fled the United States and eventually went to exile in Cuba, then to Algeria. After three years in exile in France, where Cleaver converted to Christianity, he returned to the United States and served an 8-month sentence before being paroled.
- Pan Am Flight 281 from New York City to San Juan, Puerto Rico was hijacked by four of its 78 passengers, and landed in Havana, Cuba. Two of the hijackers would be arrested in the mid-1970s, but a third, Luis Armando Peña Soltren, would not surrender to U.S. authorities until 40 years later, and would be given a 15-year prison sentence in 2011.
- Born: Todd Beamer, American marketing representative remembered as one of the passengers who attempted to take back control of United Airlines Flight 93 after its hijacking on September 11, 2001, and helped thwart a probable attack on the Capitol in Washington, D.C.; in Flint, Michigan (killed 2001)

== November 25, 1968 (Monday) ==
- New rules of engagement (ROE) were promulgated for U.S. Navy and U.S. Air Force fighters that were escorting reconnaissance airplanes over North Vietnam. Although bombing of North Vietnam (which bordered South Vietnam at the 17th parallel north had been halted, planes still flew in North Vietnamese airspace as far north as the 19th parallel. Under the new ROE, the American escort planes were allowed to fire missiles if they came under attack, including not just anti-aircraft weapons, as well as "installations and immediate supporting facilities." "American pilots," a U.S. Navy historian would later note, "became more aggressive over time, occasionally attacking sites that illuminated them with radar even if no shots were fired."
- Harold T. Luskin, Director of Apollo Applications in the NASA Office of Manned Space Flight, died in Bethesda, Maryland, of respiratory illness. He had joined NASA in March 1968 and had become Apollo Applications Director in May.
- Students rioted in the Egyptian city of Alexandria to protest the killing of students in Mansoura. By the time the day ended, 16 people were dead, 414 were wounded, and buildings and vehicles were set afire, including 50 empty buses.
- Nine members of the 25-man crew of the work boat Triple Crown were killed when the vessel capsized and sank while helping move an oil drilling platform in the Santa Barbara Channel, 8 miles (13 km) from the California shore.
- In Froissy, a village in France near Beauvais, a fire at a home for disabled children killed 14 victims, ranging from 10 to 14 years old.
- Born:
  - Shingo Takatsu, former Major League and Nippon Professional Baseball pitcher, manager since 2020 of the Japanese Tokyo Yakult Swallows team; in Minami-ku, Hiroshima
  - Jill Hennessy, Canadian-born television actress known for her roles on Law & Order; in Edmonton
- Died: Upton Sinclair, 90, American novelist and reformer best known for his 1906 classic The Jungle, an exposé of the American meatpacking industry that was influential in the passage of the first meat inspection laws, died at a nursing home at Boundbrook, New Jersey. He commented after the book's success, "I aimed at the public's heart, and by accident I hit it in the stomach."

== November 26, 1968 (Tuesday) ==
- Samuel Ichiye "S. I." Hayakawa, a native of Canada and of Japanese descent, was appointed as the new acting president of San Francisco State College, with a mission to restore law and order and to make reforms in the college's treatment of minority students. Hayakawa, who would later serve as United States Senator for California, would be given the college presidency permanently on July 9, 1969.
- Under American pressure, South Vietnam's President Nguyen Van Thieu reversed his November 2 decision not to participate in peace talks with North Vietnam that included representatives of the Viet Cong. Thieu's earlier announcement, days before the U.S. presidential election, had caused the talks to be called off.
- U.S. Air Force 1st Lt. James P. Fleming, a helicopter pilot, rescued six members of a U.S. Army Special Forces despite being shot at by the Viet Cong, and earned the Medal of Honor for his bravery.
- Faced with a crisis in which the French franc had to be devalued, France halted its nuclear testing program in an effort to save its currency from falling.
- Died: Louis D. Saperstein, 63, American insurance broker who came into disfavor with the Genovese crime family after stopping his interest payments of $5,000 per week to the American Mafia, died of arsenic poisoning a day after writing a letter to the FBI describing threats on his life by Genovese family hitman Angelo DeCarlo. DeCarlo would later be convicted of murder and serve 18 months of a 12-year sentence before being pardoned by U.S. President Richard Nixon.

== November 27, 1968 (Wednesday) ==
- Japan's Prime Minister Eisaku Satō retained his leadership of the ruling Liberal Democratic Party, and the premiership, in a challenge by two former cabinet members. Needing 226 of the votes of the 451 LDP legislators to get a majority, Satō received 249, with Shigesaburo Maeo getting 107 and future prime minister Takeo Miki getting 95.

== November 28, 1968 (Thursday) ==
- Two days after South Vietnam agreed to participate in the Paris Peace Talks, North Vietnam announced that it would negotiate only with the United States, or refuse to attend the talks altogether.
- Died: Enid Blyton, 71, popular British children's author who authored more than 300 books, including "The Famous Five" series of 21 adventure and mystery novels, died at a nursing home three months after having a heart attack. Her works had been translated into 63 other languages. At the time of her death, she had sold 30 million copies of books.

== November 29, 1968 (Friday) ==
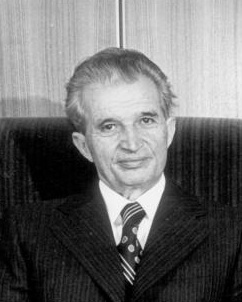
Ceaușescu

- Romanian Communist Party leader and Prime Minister Nicolae Ceaușescu became the first Warsaw Pact leader to publicly reject the "Brezhnev Doctrine" that had been announced by Soviet leader Leonid Brezhnev more than two weeks earlier. Brezhnev had said that the Communist nations had an obligation to intervene if any Pact member was deviating from socialism. Speaking before Romania's Grand National Assembly, Premier Ceaușescu said, "The affiliation to the Warsaw Treaty Organization... does not 'limit' in one way or another their state independence, but on the contrary, as the Treaty stipulates, is a means of strengthening the national independence and sovereignty of each participating state."
- English truck driver Fred West, believed to have already murdered two young girls, "met his soulmate, the woman with whom he was able to indulge his perverted desires to his heart's content", English teenager Rosemary Letts, on her 15th birthday in Bishop's Cleeve, Gloucestershire. They would marry a year later and, before their arrests in 1994, would work together as a husband-and-wife serial killer team. Between 1971 and 1987, Fred and Rose West would murder at least 10 more women and girls, mostly at their home at 25 Cromwell Street in Gloucester.
- Born:
  - Jonathan Knight, American singer and member of the boy band New Kids on the Block; in Worcester, Massachusetts
  - Hayabusa (ring name for Eiji Ezaki), Japanese professional wrestler (d. 2016); in Yatsushiro City

== November 30, 1968 (Saturday) ==
- Rescue efforts halted for the 78 coal miners trapped by the Farmington Mine disaster explosion as the decision was made to seal up all portals into Consolidation Coal Company Mine No. 9 at Mannington, West Virginia, extinguishing the underground fires and entombing the bodies inside. Air samples at the Mod's Run area of the mine revealed that the concentration of carbon monoxide and methane was too high for anyone to have survived. The sealing came ten days after the explosion, and hours after company president William J. Corcoran had met the night before with the relatives of the 78 men and announced the decision. Over the next nine and a half years, the bodies of 59 of the coal miners would be recovered, with the first being located on October 23, 1969, the body of the first victim would be located and removed by a recovery team. However, on April 19, 1978, the company announced that it would cease its recovery efforts and seal the mine again, along with the 19 remaining bodies of the 1968 victims.
- Born: Rica Matsumoto, Japanese actress known for voicing Satoshi (Ash Ketchum in English dubs), the main character of the Pokémon series for 25 seasons; in Yokohama, Kanagawa
