= Paul Riessler =

German biblical scholar

Paul Riessler (Rießler) (1865 – 1935) was a noted German biblical scholar who has written a number of widely recognized books including Altjüdisches Schrifttum außerhalb der Bibel.

== Biography ==
Paul Riessler was born 16 September 1865 in Stuttgart, Germany. He died on 16 September 1935 in Tübingen, Germany.

== Bibliography ==
A German-language version of his bibliography can be found at Christoph Schmitt (1994). "Paul Riessler". In Bautz, Traugott (ed.). Biographisch-Bibliographisches Kirchenlexikon (BBKL) (in German). Vol. 8. Herzberg: Bautz. cols. 338–341. ISBN 3-88309-053-0..

His first translation of the Old Testament was published in 1924.
