= Romano Guardini =

Italian-born German Catholic priest, philosopher and theologian (1885–1968)

Servant of God Romano Guardini
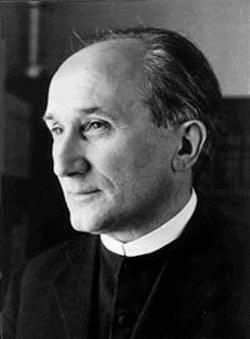
- Guardini in 1920

Orders
- Ordination: 28 May 1910 (Priest) by Georg Heinrich Kirstein

Personal details
- Born: Romano Michele Antonio Maria Guardini; 17 February 1885 Verona, Kingdom of Italy
- Died: 1 October 1968 (aged 83) Munich, West Germany
- Education: University of Tübingen; University of Freiburg

Romano Guardini (17 February 1885, Verona, Italy – 1 October 1968, Munich, Germany) was an Italian, naturalized German Catholic priest, philosopher and theologian.

== Life ==
Romano Michele Antonio Maria Guardini was born in Verona in 1885 and was baptized in the Church of San Nicolò all'Arena. His father, Romano Tullo (1857–1919), was a poultry wholesaler. Guardini had three younger brothers. The family moved to Mainz when he was one year old, and he lived in Germany for the rest of his life. He attended the Rabanus-Maurus-Gymnasium. Guardini wrote that as a young man he was “always anxious and very scrupulous.”

Fluent in Italian and German, he also studied Latin, Greek, French, and English. After studying chemistry at the University of Tübingen for two semesters, and economics at the Ludwig-Maximilians-Universität München and the Friedrich Wilhelm University of Berlin for three semesters, he decided to become a priest. He studied theology at the University of Freiburg and the University of Tübingen. Impressed by the monastic spirituality of the monks of Beuron Archabbey, he became a Benedictine oblate, taking the name Odilio. Guardini was ordained a diocesan priest in Mainz by Georg Heinrich Kirstein in 1910.

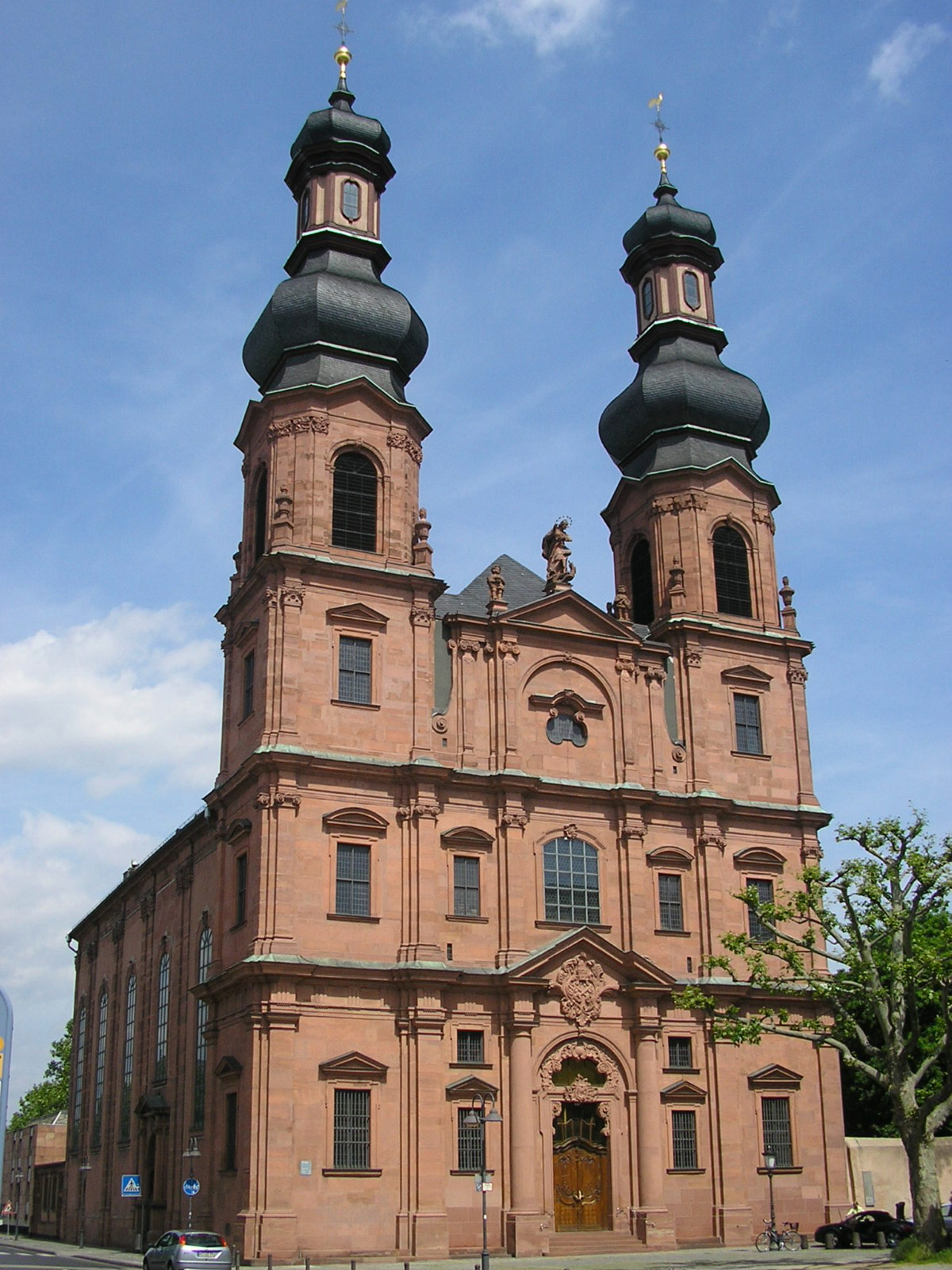
St. Peter's Church in Mainz

He became a German citizen in 1911 so that he could teach theology in Germany, a job paid by the government. He briefly worked in a pastoral position at St. Christoph's Church in Mainz before returning to Freiburg to work on his doctorate in Theology under Engelbert Krebs. He received his doctorate in 1915 for a dissertation on Bonaventure. He completed his "Habilitation" in Dogmatic Theology at the University of Bonn in 1922, again with a dissertation on Bonaventure. Throughout this period, he also worked as a parish priest at St. Ignatius, St. Emmeran's, and St. Peter's and served as chaplain to the Catholic youth movement. During World War I he served as a hospital orderly.

In 1923, he was appointed to a chair in Philosophy of Religion at the Friedrich Wilhelm University of Berlin. In the 1935 essay "Der Heiland" (The Saviour), he criticized Nazi mythologizing of the person of Jesus and emphasized the Jewishness of Jesus. The Nazis forced him to resign from his Berlin position in 1939. From 1943 to 1945, he retired to Mooshausen, where his friend Josef Weiger had been a parish priest since 1917.

In 1945, Guardini was appointed professor in the Faculty of Philosophy at the University of Tübingen and resumed lecturing on the Philosophy of Religion. In 1948, he became professor at the Ludwig-Maximilians-Universität München, where he remained until retiring for health reasons in 1962. That same year, he received the Erasmus Prize, an annual prize awarded by the board of the Praemium Erasmianum Foundation to individuals or institutions that have made exceptional contributions to culture, society, or social science in Europe.

Pope Paul VI offered to make Guardini a cardinal in 1965, but he declined.

Guardini died in Munich on 1 October 1968. He was buried in the priests’ cemetery of the Oratory of St. Philip Neri in the city. His estate was left to the Catholic Academy in Bavaria that he had co-founded.

== Veneration ==
In December 2017, the Archdiocese of Munich and Freising opened the beatification process for Guardini, thus designating him a Servant of God.

== Reputation and influence ==
Guardini's books were often powerful studies of traditional themes in the light of present-day challenges or examinations of current problems as approached from the Christian, and especially Catholic, tradition. He was able to enter into the worldview of those such as Socrates, Plato, Augustine, Dante, Pascal, Kierkegaard, Dostoevsky and Nietzsche, and make sense of them for modern readers.

His first major work, Vom Geist der Liturgie (The Spirit of the Liturgy), published during the First World War, was a major influence on the Liturgical Movement in Germany and, by extension, on the liturgical reforms of the Second Vatican Council. He is generally regarded as the father of the liturgical movement in Germany, and in his "Open Letter" of April 1964 to Mgr. Johannes Wagner, the organizer of the Third German Liturgical Congress in Mainz, he "raises important questions regarding the nature of the liturgical act in the wake of individualism, asking whether it is possible for twentieth-century Christians really to engage in worship. Is it possible to 'relearn a forgotten way of doing things and recapture lost attitudes', so as to enter into the liturgical experience?' It was his glad hope that after the call by the Second Vatican Council for liturgical reform, the Catholic Church might shift its focus from the merely ceremonial, important though that was, to a broader idea of true liturgical action—action that "embraced not only a spiritual inwardness, but the whole man, body as well as spirit." He himself gave an example of his meaning: A parish priest of the late 19th century once said (according to Guardini's illustration), "We must organize the procession better; we must see to it that the praying and singing is done better." For Guardini, the parish priest had missed the point of what true liturgical action is. He should instead have asked, "How can the act of walking become a religious act, a retinue for the Lord progressing through his land, so that an 'epiphany' may take place?"

As a philosopher, he founded no "school", but his intellectual disciples could in some sense be said to include Josef Pieper, Luigi Giussani, Felix Messerschmid, Heinrich Getzeny, Rudolf Schwarz, Jean Gebser, Joseph Ratzinger (later Pope Benedict XVI), and Jorge Mario Bergoglio (later Pope Francis). In the 1980s, Bergoglio began work on a doctoral dissertation on Guardini, though he never completed it. Pope Francis cited Guardini's The End of the Modern World eight times in his 2015 encyclical Laudato si', more often than any other modern thinker who was not a pope. Guardini was also cited by Pope Leo XIV in his first encyclical, Magnifica humanitas. Hannah Arendt and Iring Fetscher were favourably impressed by Guardini's work. He had a strong influence in Central Europe; in Slovenia, for example, an influential group of Christian socialists, among whom Edvard Kocbek, Pino Mlakar, Vekoslav Grmič and Boris Pahor, incorporated Guardini's views into their agenda. Slovak philosopher and theologian Ladislav Hanus was strongly influenced in his works by Guardini, whom he met personally, and promoted his ideas in Slovakia, writing a short monograph. In 1952, Guardini won the Peace Prize of the German Book Trade.

The 1990s saw something of a revival of interest in his works and person. Several of his books were reissued in the original German and in English translation. In 1997, his remains were moved to the Ludwigskirche, the University church in Munich, where he had often preached.

== Bibliography ==
- Vom Geist der Liturgie (1918)
- Gottes Werkleute. Briefe über Selbstbildung (1921)
- Von heiligen Zeichen (1922–1925)
- Auf dem Wege (1923) (On the Way)
- Der Gegensatz (1925)
- Der Ausgangspunkt der Denkbewegung Søren Kierkegaards (1927)
- Grundlegung der Bildungslehre (1928)
- Das Gute, das Gewissen und die Sammlung (1929)
- Vom Sinn der Kirche (1933) (The Meaning of the Church)
- Christliches Bewusstsein (1935)
- Unterscheidung des Christlichen (1935) (Distinction of the Christian)
- Das Wesen des Christentums (1937)
- Dante-Studien, 1. Band: Der Engel in Dantes Göttlicher Komödie (1937)
- Welt und Person (1939)
- Der Tod des Sokrates (1943)
- Vorschule des Betens (1943)
- Die Lebensalter (1944)
- Freiheit, Gnade, Schicksal (1948)
- Das Ende der Neuzeit (1950)
- Begegnung und Bildung (together with O. F. Bollnow) (1956)
- Dante-Studien, 2. Band: Landschaft der Ewigkeit (München, 1958)
- Sorge um den Menschen (1962)
- Die Kirche Des Herrn (Würzburg, 1965) (The Church of the Lord)
- Religiöse Gestalten in Dostojewskijs Werk (Mainz/Paderborn, 1989)
- Dante-Studien, 3. Band: Dantes Göttliche Komödie. Ihre philosophischen und religiösen Grundgedanken (Vorlesungen). Aus dem Nachlaß herausgegeben von Martin Marschall. (Grünewald / Schöningh, Mainz / Paderborn, 1998) ISBN 3-7867-2129-7 / ISBN 3-506-74559-X

=== Works in English ===
- Freedom, Grace, and Destiny. Cluny Media, 2023. ISBN 978-1685952259
- Pascal: A Study in Christian Consciousness. Cluny Media, 2022. ISBN 978-1685951139
- The End of the Modern World. Sheed & Ward, 1956. More recently in a revised edition by ISI Books, 1998. ISBN 978-1-882926-23-7
- Prayer In Practice 1957.
- The Church of the Lord: On the Nature and Mission of the Church, 1966.
- The Art of Praying: The Principles and Methods of Christian Prayer. Sophia Institute Press, 1994. ISBN 978-0-918477-21-7
- The Lord. Regnery Publishing, 1996. ISBN 978-0-89526-714-6 with an introduction by Cardinal Joseph Ratzinger.
  A version of The Lord published in English translation in the late 1940s remained in print for decades and, according to publisher Henry Regnery, was "one of the most successful books I have ever published". The novelist Flannery O'Connor thought it "very fine" and recommended it to a number of her friends.
- The Spirit of the Liturgy. Crossroad Publishing, 1998. ISBN 978-0-8245-1777-9
- Living the Drama of Faith. Sophia Institute Press, 1999. ISBN 978-0-918477-77-4
- Learning the Virtues. Sophia Institute Press, 2000. ISBN 978-0-918477-64-4
- The Death of Socrates. Kessinger Publishing, 2007. ISBN 978-1-4325-5430-9
- The Rosary of Our Lady. Sophia Institute Press, 1998.
- Sacred Signs. CreateSpace Independent Publishing Platform, 2015. ISBN 978-1-5088-3208-9
- The Humanity of Christ: Contributions to a Psychology of Jesus. Cluny Media, 2018. ISBN 978-1-949899-29-0
- The Human Experience: Essays on Providence, Melancholy, Community, and Freedom. Cluny Media, 2018. ISBN 978-1-944418-84-7
- The Meaning of the Church. Cluny Media, 2018. ISBN 978-1-944418-99-1
- The Spirit of the Liturgy. Cluny Media, 2018. ISBN 978-1-944418-67-0
- The Death of Socrates. Cluny Media, 2019. ISBN 978-1-949899-42-9
- Rilke's Duino Elegies: An Interpretation. Cluny Media, 2019. ISBN 978-1-952826-46-7
- The Last Things. Cluny Media, 2019. ISBN 978-1-949899-48-1
- The Conversion of Augustine. Cluny Media, 2020. ISBN 978-1-952826-46-7
