= Church 2011 =

Document demanding reform of the Roman Catholic in response to sex abuse scandal

Church 2011 is a memorandum promulgated by Catholic theology professors, primarily from Germany, Switzerland and Austria. The memorandum, whose full German title is Kirche 2011: Ein notwendiger Aufbruch, was started in Germany in January 2011. The memorandum is a general demand for reform of the Roman Catholic Church in response to the sexual abuse scandal among German priests.

== Description ==
The memorandum demands:

1. Structures of participation: more participation of all people in the Catholic Church, particularly through election of bishops and priests;
2. Parish community: more help for Catholic communities, with a more explicit sharing of responsibilities. Married priests and women as priests should be allowed;
3. Legal culture: the Catholic Church should initiate a church jurisdiction;
4. Freedom of conscience: respect for individual conscience, particularly for divorced people, who want to marry again, and for homosexual civil unions;
5. Reconciliation: greater reconciliation of the church to her own history; and
6. Worship: reform of the Roman Catholic liturgy (with greater modern influence, and more influence from the cultural life of countries).

As of February 2011, over 300 Catholic professors, theologians and other religious scientists from across the world had signed the memorandum.

== List of signators ==
=== German language territory ===
1. Michael Albus, University of Freiburg
2. Franz Annen, University of Chur
3. Arno Anzenbacher, University of Mainz
4. Edmund Arens, University of Lucerne
5. Antonio Autiero, University of Münster
6. Karl Baier, University of Vienna
7. Franz-Josef Bäumer, University of Giessen
8. Georg Baudler, University of Aachen
9. Urs Baumann, University of Tübingen
10. Isidor Baumgartner, University of Passau
11. Ulrike Bechmann, University of Graz
12. Manfred Belok, University of Chur
13. Andreas Benk, University of Schwäbisch Gmünd
14. Johannes Beutler, University of Frankfurt
15. Klaus Bieberstein, University of Bamberg
16. Sabine Bieberstein, University of Eichstätt
17. Albert Biesinger, University of Tübingen
18. Franz Xaver Bischof, LMU Munich
19. Martina Blasberg-Kuhnke, University of Osnabrück
20. Thomas Böhm, University of Freiburg
21. Michael Böhnke, University of Wuppertal
22. Christoph Böttigheimer, University of Eichstätt
23. Karl Bopp, University of Benediktbeuern
24. Karl-Heinz Braun, University of Freiburg
25. Thomas Bremer, University of Münster
26. Johannes Brosseder, University of Cologne
27. Ingo Broer, University of Siegen
28. Anton A. Bucher, University of Salzburg
29. Giancarlo Collet, University of Münster
30. Gerhard Dautzenberg, University of Giessen
31. Sabine Demel, University of Regensburg
32. Detlev Dormeyer, University of Dortmund
33. Gerhard Droesser, University of Würzburg
34. Margit Eckholt, University of Osnabrück
35. Peter Eicher, University of Paderborn
36. Volker Eid, University of Bamberg
37. Bernhard Emunds, Goethe University Frankfurt
38. Rudolf Englert, University of Duisburg
39. Stephan Ernst, University of Würzburg
40. Wolfgang G. Esser, University of Dortmund
41. Reinhold Esterbauer, University of Graz
42. Heinz-Josef Fabry, University of Bonn
43. Ernst Feil, LMU Munich
44. Reinhard Feiter, University of Münster
45. Michael Felder, University of Freiburg in Uechtland
46. Rupert Feneberg, University of Weingarten
47. Hubert Frankemölle, University of Paderborn
48. Albert Franz, University of Dresden
49. Christian Frevel, University of Cologne
50. Edward Fröhling, University of Vallendar
51. Ottmar Fuchs, University of Tübingen
52. Alfons Fürst, University of Münster
53. Ingeborg Gabriel, University of Vienna
54. Karl Gabriel, University of Münster
55. Erich Garhammer, University of Würzburg
56. Albert Gasser, University of Chur
57. Martin Gertler, University of Cologne
58. Reinhard Göllner, Ruhr University Bochum
59. Stephan Goertz, University of Mainz
60. Heinz-Jürgen Görtz, University of Hannover
61. Norbert Greinacher, University of Tübingen
62. Franz Gruber, University of Linz
63. Bernhard Grümme, University of Ludwigsburg
64. Wilhelm Guggenberger, University of Innsbruck
65. Gerd Häfner, LMU Munich
66. Hille Haker, Goethe University Frankfurt
67. Hubertus Halbfas, University of Reutlingen
68. Hans Halter, University of Luzern
69. Richard Hartmann, University of Fulda
70. Linus Hauser, University of Giessen
71. Christoph Heil, University of Graz
72. Marianne Heimbach-Steins, University of Bamberg
73. Theresia Heimerl, University of Graz
74. Hanspeter Heinz, University of Augsburg
75. Ulrich Hemel, University of Regensburg
76. Friedhelm Hengsbach, University of Sankt Georgen
77. Bernd Jochen Hilberath, University of Tübingen
78. Georg Hilger, University of Regensburg
79. Konrad Hilpert, LMU Munich
80. Hans Gerald Hödl, University of Vienna
81. Rudolf Höfer, University of Graz
82. Hans-Joachim Höhn, University of Cologne
83. Johannes Hoffmann, Goethe University Frankfurt
84. Paul Hoffmann, University of Bamberg
85. Adrian Holderegger, University of Freiburg im Uechtland
86. Andreas Holzem, University of Tübingen
87. Reinhard Hübner, LMU Munich
88. Peter Hünermann, University of Tübingen
89. Hubert Irsigler, University of Freiburg
90. Martin Jäggle, University of Vienna
91. Bernhard Jendorff, University of Kassel
92. Hans Jorissen, University of Bonn
93. Christina Kalloch, University of Hannover
94. Rainer Kampling, University of Berlin
95. Leo Karrer, University of Freiburg im Uechtland
96. Othmar Keel, University of Freiburg im Uechtland
97. Walter Kern, University of Ludwigsburg
98. Hans Kessler, Goethe University Frankfurt
99. Klaus Kienzler, University of Augsburg
100. Klaus Kießling, Goethe University Frankfurt
101. Walter Kirchschläger, University of Luzern
102. Stephanie B. Klein, University of Salzburg
103. Stefan Knobloch, University of Mainz
104. Joachim Köhler, University of Tübingen
105. Judith Könemann, University of Münster
106. Helga Kohler-Spiegel, University of Voralberg
107. Anton Kolb, University of Graz
108. Roland Kollmann, University of Dortmund
109. Wilhelm Korff, University of Tübingen
110. Elmar Kos, University of Vechta
111. Georg Kraus, University of Bamberg
112. Gerhard Kruip, University of Mainz
113. Max Küchler, University of Freiburg im Uechtland
114. Joachim Kügler, University of Bamberg
115. Roman Kühschelm, University of Vienna
116. Hans Küng, University of Tübingen
117. Karl-Christoph Kuhn, University of Tübingen
118. Ulrich Kuhnke, University of Osnabruck
119. Lothar Kuld, University of Weingarten
120. Karl-Josef Kuschel, University of Tübingen
121. Raimund Lachner, University of Vechta
122. Karl Heinz Ladenhauf, University of Graz
123. Anton Landersdorfer, University of Passau
124. Bernhard Lang, University of Paderborn
125. Georg Langenhorst, University of Augsburg
126. Wolfgang Langer, University of Vienna
127. Rudolf Langthaler, University of Vienna
128. Gerhard Larcher, University of Graz
129. Karl Josef Lesch, University of Vechta
130. Ernst Leuninger, University of Vallendar
131. Maximilian Liebmann, University of Graz
132. Winfried Löffler, University of Innsbruck
133. Adrian Loretan, University of Luzern
134. Klaus Lüdicke, University of Münster
135. Heiner Ludwig, University of Darmstadt
136. Hubertus Lutterbach, University of Essen
137. Joachim Maier, Heidelberg University
138. Johannes Meier, University of Mainz
139. Hans Mendl, University of Passau
140. Friedhelm Mennekes, University of Sankt Georgen
141. Karl-Wilhelm Merks, University of Tilburg, Netherlands
142. Norbert Mette, University of Dortmund
143. Guido Meyer University of Aachen
144. Andreas Michel, University of Cologne
145. Anja Middelbeck-Varwick, University of Berlin
146. Dietmar Mieth, University of Tübingen
147. Heinrich Missalla, University of Essen
148. Matthias Möhring-Hesse, University of Vechta
149. Hilary Mooney, University of Weingarten
150. Klaus Müller, University of Münster
151. Ilse Müllner, University of Kassel
152. Doris Nauer, University of Vallendar
153. Peter Neuner, LMU Munich
154. Monika Nickel, University of Passau
155. Heribert Niederschlag, University of Vallendar
156. Christoph Niemand, University of Linz
157. Franz-Josef Nocke, University of Essen
158. Andreas Odenthal, University of Tübingen
159. Karl-Heinz Ohlig, University of Saarbrücken
160. Hans-Ludwig Ollig, Goethe University Frankfurt
161. Wolfgang Palaver, University of Innsbruck
162. Silvia Pellegrini, University of Vechta
163. Sabine Pemsel-Maier, University of Karlsruhe
164. Otto Hermann Pesch, University of Hamburg
165. Johann Pock, University of Vienna
166. Uta Poplutz, University of Wuppertal
167. Burkard Porzelt, University of Regensburg
168. Thomas Pröpper, University of Münster
169. Gunter Prüller-Jagenteufel, University of Vienna
170. Walter Raberger, University of Linz
171. Michael Raske, Goethe University Frankfurt
172. Johann Reikerstorfer, University of Vienna
173. Elisabeth Reil, University of Konstanz
174. Helmut Renöckl, University of Linz
175. Eleonore Reuter, University of Mainz
176. Klemens Richter, University of Münster
177. Bert Roebben, University of Dortmund
178. Eberhard Rolinck, University of Münster
179. Hans Rotter, University of Innsbruck
180. Karlheinz Ruhstorfer, University of Koblenz
181. Gerhard A. Rummel, University of Freiburg
182. Ralph Sauer, University of Vechta
183. Sabine Schäper, University of Münster
184. Mirjam Schambeck, University of Bamberg
185. Matthias Scharer, University of Innsbruck
186. Monika Scheidler, University of Dresden
187. Hans Schelkshorn, University of Vienna
188. Karl Schlemmer, University of Passau
189. Udo Schmälzle, University of Münster
190. Bruno Schmid, University of Weingarten
191. Heinrich Schmidinger, University of Salzburg
192. Thomas M. Schmidt, Goethe University Frankfurt
193. Joachim Schmiedl, University of Vallendar
194. Eberhard Schockenhoff, University of Freiburg
195. Norbert Scholl, Heidelberg University
196. Michael Schramm, University of Hohenheim
197. Stefan Schreiber, University of Augsburg
198. Thomas Schreijäck, Goethe University Frankfurt
199. Thomas Schüller, University of Münster
200. Helen Schüngel-Straumann, University of Cologne
201. Ehrenfried Schulz, LMU Munich
202. Hans Reinhard Seeliger, University of Tübingen
203. Josef Senft, University of Cologne
204. Roman A. Siebenrock, University of Innsbruck
205. Hermann Pius Siller, Goethe University Frankfurt
206. Werner Simon, University of Mainz
207. Egon Spiegel, University of Vechta
208. Hermann Steinkamp, University of Münster
209. Georg Steins, University of Osnabrück
210. Hermann Stenger, University of Innsbruck
211. Hermann-Josef Stipp, LMU Munich
212. Klaus von Stosch, University of Paderborn
213. Magnus Striet, University of Freiburg
214. Angelika Strotmann, University of Paderborn
215. Joachim Theis, University of Trier
216. Michael Theobald, University of Tübingen
217. Franz Trautmann, University of Schwäbisch-Gmünd
218. Maria Trautmann, University of Eichstätt
219. Wolfgang Treitler, University of Vienna
220. Bernd Trocholepczy, Goethe University Frankfurt
221. Peter Trummer, University of Graz
222. Hermann-Josef Venetz, University of Freiburg im Uechtland
223. Markus Vogt, LMU Munich
224. Marie-Theres Wacker, University of Münster
225. Heribert Wahl, University of Trier
226. Peter Walter, University of Mainz
227. Franz Weber, University of Innsbruck
228. Wolfgang Weirer, University of Graz
229. Saskia Wendel, University of Cologne
230. Knut Wenzel, Goethe University Frankfurt
231. Ludwig Wenzler, University of Freiburg
232. Jürgen Werbick, University of Münster
233. Christian Wessely, University of Graz
234. Dietrich Wiederkehr, University of Luzern
235. Annette Wilke, University of Münster
236. Ulrich Willers, University of Eichstätt
237. Werner Wolbert, University of Salzburg
238. Martha Zechmeister, University of Passau
239. Hans-Georg Ziebertz, University of Würzburg
240. Reinhold Zwick, University of Münster

=== Professors, theologians and other religious scientists from non-German speaking countries ===
1. Xavier Alegre (El Salvador)
2. Olaizola Arregi (Spain)
3. Jesús Asurmendi (France)
4. Gregory Baum (Canada)
5. José Manuel Bernal Cantos (Spain)
6. José Bernardi (Brazil)
7. Ignace Berten (Belgium)
8. Montserrat Biosca Duch (Spain)
9. Alberto Bondolfi (Switzerland)
10. Eberhard Bons (France)
11. Sánchez Castillo (Spain)
12. José Centeno (Spain)
13. Aldir Crocoli (Brasil)
14. Ton Danenberg (Philippines)
15. Juan Antonio Estrada (Spain)
16. Marcio Fabri (Brazil)
17. Rufo Fernández Pérez (Spain)
18. Dolores Figueras Fondevila (Spain)
19. Bejamin Forcano Cebollada (Spain)
20. Judette Gallares (Spain)
21. Máximo Garcia Ruiz (Spain)
22. Marcelo Juan González (Argentina)
23. Jan Jans (Belgium)
24. Werner G. Jeanrond (United Kingdom)
25. Miro Jelecevic (Bosnia and Herzegovina)
26. Elisa Jiménez Xifre (Spain)
27. Janez Juhant (Slovenia)
28. Walter Lesch (France)
29. Julio Lois Fernández (Spain)
30. Aloysius Lopez Cartagenas (Philippines)
31. Ivo Markovic (Bosnia and Herzegovina)
32. Juan Masia Clavel (Spain))
33. José Mario Méndez Méndez (Costa Rica)
34. Anthony T. Padovano (United States)
35. José Antonio Pagola Elorza (Spain)
36. Luis Augusto Panchi (Ecuador)
37. Federico Pastor Ramos (Spain)
38. Jesús Peláez del Rosal (Spain)
39. Richard Penaskovic (United States)
40. Margarita Pintos de Cea-Naharro (Spain)
41. Félix Placer Ugarte (Spain)
42. John Mansford Prior (Indonesia)
43. Julio Puente López (Spain)
44. Mertxe Renovales (Spain)
45. Susan Roll (Canada)
46. Giuseppe Ruggieri (Italy)
47. José Sánchez (Mexico)
48. Torrado Sánchez (Spain)
49. Joseph Selling (Belgium)
50. Thomas Shannon (United States)
51. Jon Sobrino (El Salvador)
52. Jacqui Stewart (United Kingdom)
53. Silvana Suaiden (Brasil)
54. Luiz Carlos Susin (Brasil)
55. Paulo Suess (Brasil)
56. Juan José Tamayo Acosta (Spain)
57. Marie-Jo Thiel (France)
58. Christoph Theobald (France)
59. Andrés Torres Queiruga (Spain)
60. Caroline Vander Stichele (Netherlands)
61. Rufino Velasco Martinez (Spain)
62. Marciano Vidal Garcia (Spain)
63. Evaristo Villar Villar (Spain)
64. Javier Vitoria (Spain)
65. Lode Lucas Wostyn (Philippines)
66. Juan Yzuel (Spain)
67. Marta Zubia (Guinea)

== See also ==
- Roman Catholic sex abuse cases by country § Germany
