= Pedra das Cabras =

Prehistoric rock carving in Galicia

Stone of the Goats
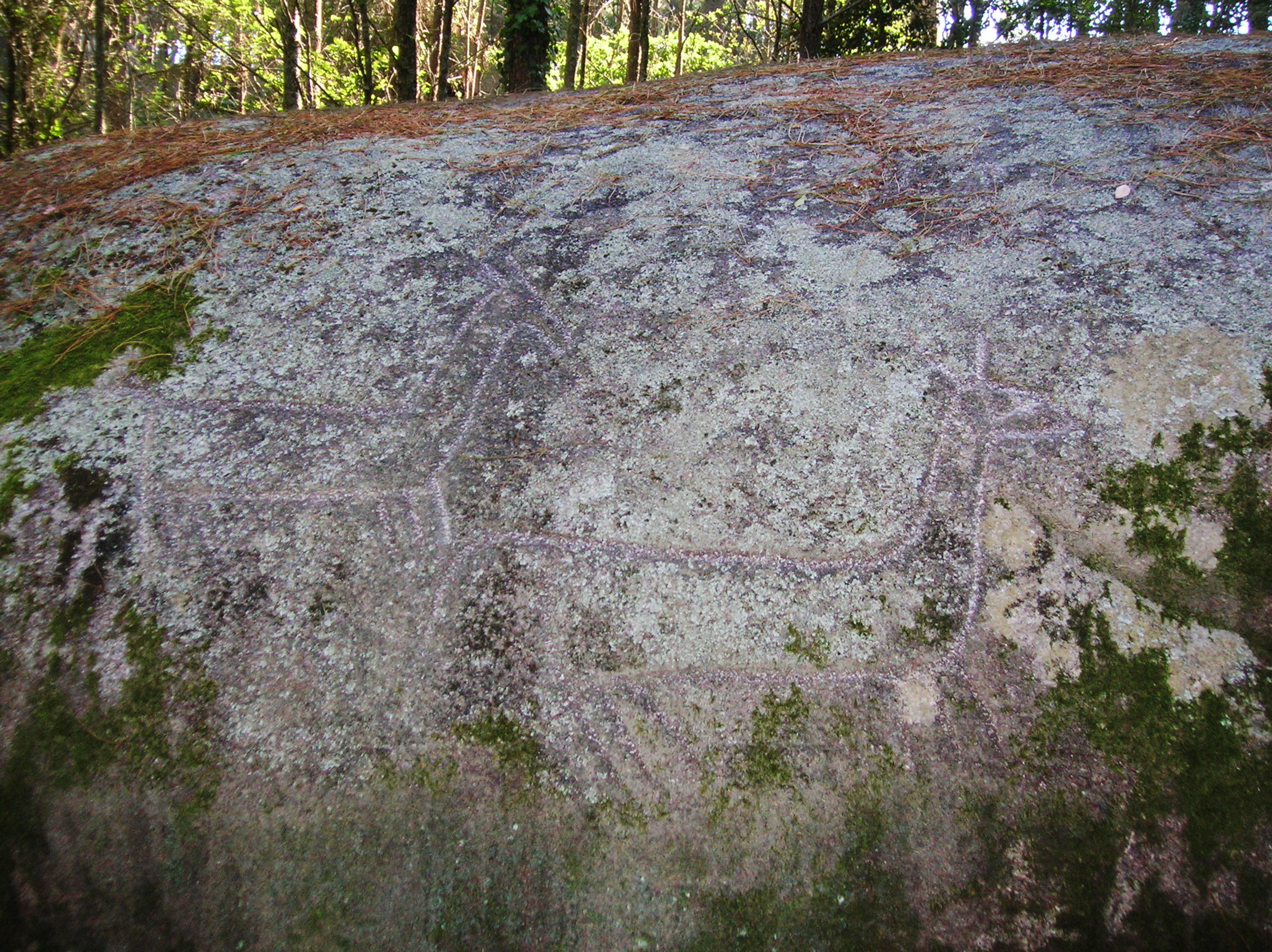
- The stone in 2006

- Location in Galicia, Spain
- 42°34′37.1″N 08°59′05.0″W
- Type: Rock art
- Location: Galicia, Spain

History
- Built: c. 2000 BC

The Stone of the Goats (Galician: Pedra das Cabras) is a petroglyph located in a pine forest near the village of Figueirido (civil parish of Palmeira, municipality of Ribeira), in the Barbanza Region of Galicia.

== Description ==
The zoomorphic motifs are scratched into the side of a large solitary rock and depict two animals, possibly goats. Each animal has six legs, which might have been a deliberate choice to represent movement in the figures. The engravings have been tentatively dated to the Neolithic.

== Image gallery ==
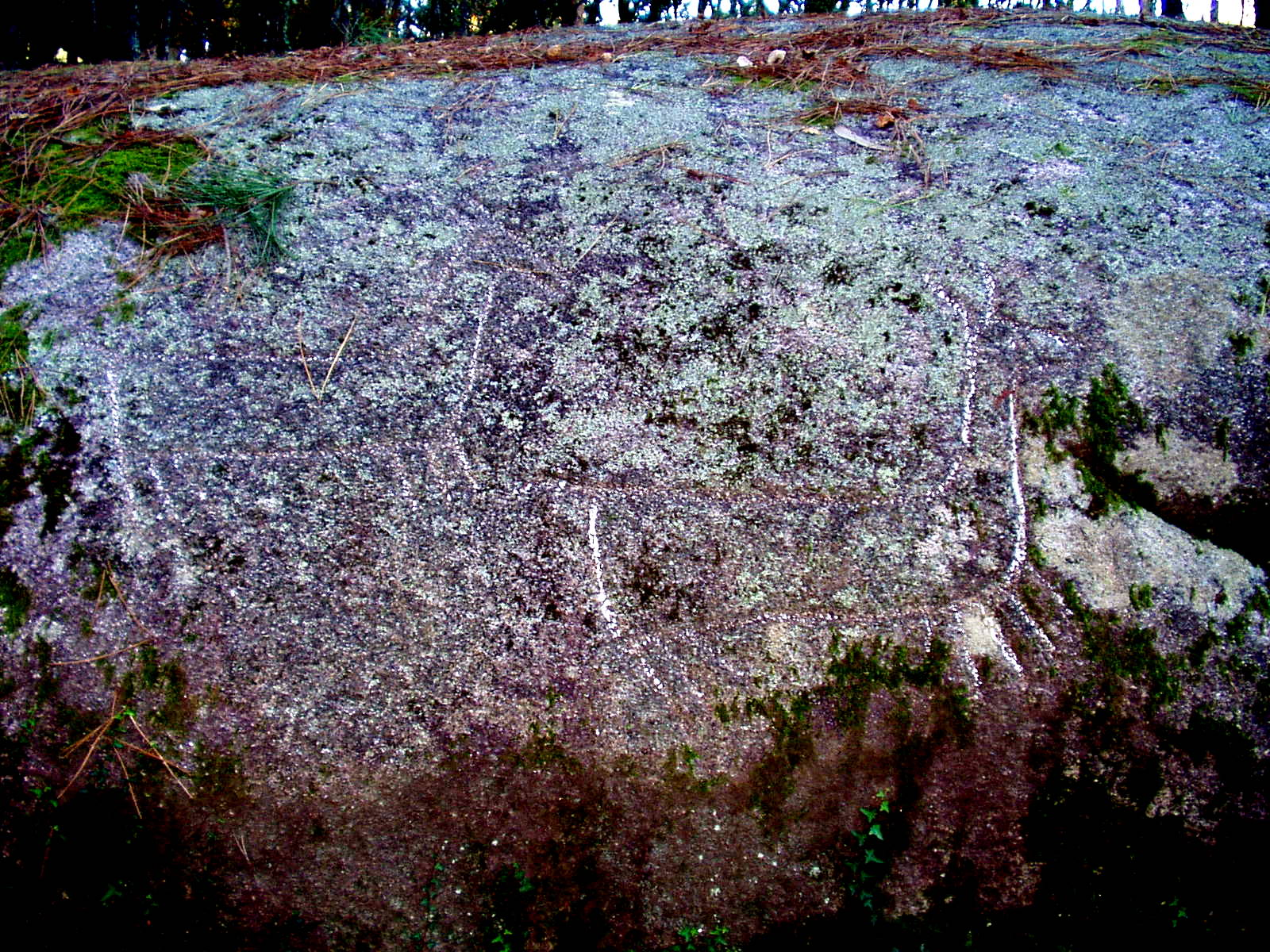
Petroglyph detail

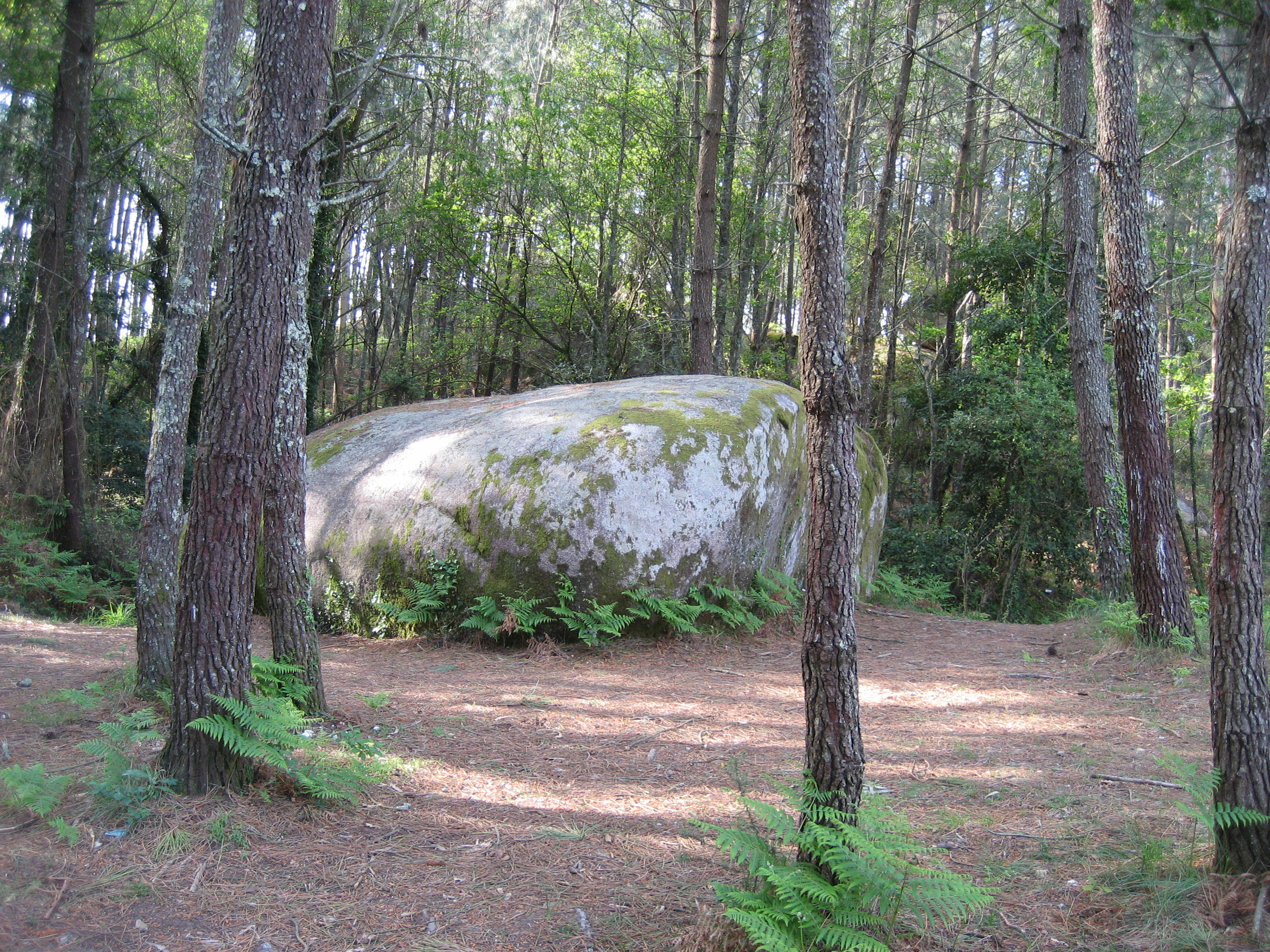
Petroglyph setting
