= Christine Büchner =

German university teacher

Christine Büchner (born 1970 in Frankfurt am Main, West Germany) is a German Roman Catholic theologian and author.

Christine Büchner studied Catholic Theology, German Studies and Latin Philology at Goethe University Frankfurt from 1989 to 1995. From 1995 to 1997 she worked as a student teacher. From 1998 to 1999, the Hanns Seidel Foundation supported her with a doctoral scholarship. From 1999 to 2004 she worked as a research assistant at the Department of Catholic Theology of Goethe University Frankfurt in the field of systematic theology. In 2003, she was awarded her PhD for the work Gottes Kreatur – „ein reines Nichts“? Einheit Gottes als Ermöglichung von Geschöpflichkeit und Personalität im Werk Meister Eckharts. In 2004 and 2005 she studied Sanskrit at the University of Tübingen.

There she worked as a research assistant at the Faculty of Catholic Theology (Dogmatics and History of Dogma) from 2004 to 2006, where she habilitated in dogmatics and ecumenical theology in 2008 and then taught as a private lecturer from 2008 to 2013. At the same time, she received graduate funding from the University of Tübingen and the Gerda Henkel Foundation. Between 2006 and 2011 she held several teaching positions at Goethe University Frankfurt. From 2007 to 2013 she was a senior teacher in Frankfurt. From 2014 to 2020 she was Professor of Catholic Theology at the University of Hamburg and simultaneously from 2018 to 2020 Deputy Director of the Academy of World Religions there. Since 2020, she has held the Chair of Dogmatics at the Faculty of Catholic Theology at Julius-Maximilians-Universität Würzburg.

Büchner's past and current research is focused on mysticism and spirituality, theology of the gift, theological history of the Middle Ages and the early modern period, interreligious dialogue, and women's theological thinking in the history of theology and in the present – with special regard to models of the relationship between God and the world.

She is married to the writer Andreas Maier.

== Academic awards ==
- 2004 Karl Rahner Prize for Theological Research
- 2007 John Templeton Award for Theological Promise

== Selected memberships ==
- Since 2019: member of the advisory board (since 9/2023 head) of the working group Catholic Dogmatics and Fundamental Theology of the German-speaking world
- Since 2016: member of the scientific Advisory Board of the Jakob Fugger Center for Transnational Studies at the University of Augsburg
- 2008–2018: Member of the Extended Board, (since 2018 Member of the Board) of the Meister-Eckhart-Gesellschaft (Meister-Eckhart Society)

== Selected publications ==
- Gottes Kreatur – „ein reines Nichts“? Einheit Gottes als Ermöglichung von Geschöpflichkeit und Personalität im Werk Meister Eckharts. Tyrolia, Innsbruck 2005, ISBN 3-7022-2640-0 (zugleich Dissertation, Frankfurt am Main 2003).
- with Andreas Maier: Bullau. Versuch über Natur. Heinrich & Hahn, Frankfurt am Main 2006, ISBN 3-86597-038-9.
- Die Transformation des Einheitsdenkens Meister Eckharts bei Heinrich Seuse and Johannes Tauler (= Meister-Eckhart-Jahrbuch, Beiheft 1). Kohlhammer, Stuttgart 2007, ISBN 978-3-17-019378-9.
- Hildegard von Bingen. Eine Lebensgeschichte (= Insel-Taschenbuch, Band 3369). Insel-Verl., Frankfurt am Main 2009, ISBN 978-3-458-35069-9.
- Wie kann Gott in der Welt wirken? Überlegungen zu einer theologischen Hermeneutik des Sich-Gebens. Herder, Freiburg im Breisgau 2010, ISBN 978-3-451-32283-9 (zugleich Habilitationsschrift, Universität Tübingen, 2008).
- Editor (with Christine Jung, Bernhard Nitsche and Lucia Scherzberg): Kommunikation ist möglich. Theologische, ökumenische und interreligiöse Lernprozesse. Festschrift für Bernd Jochen Hilberath. Matthias-Grünewald-Verl., Ostfildern 2013, ISBN 3-7867-2993-X.
- Editor (with Gerrit Spallek): Im Gespräch mit der Welt. Eine Einführung in die Theologie. Matthias-Grünewald-Verl., Ostfildern 2016, ISBN 3-7867-3067-9.
- Editor (with Markus Enders and Dietmar Mieth): Meister Eckhart interreligiös (= Meister-Eckhart-Jahrbuch, Band 10). Kohlhammer, Stuttgart 2016, ISBN 978-3-17-031542-6.
- Editor (with Gerrit Spallek): Auf den Punkt gebracht. Grundbegriffe der Theologie. Matthias-Grünewald-Verl., Ostfildern 2017, ISBN 3-7867-3119-5.
- Editor (with Nathalie Giele): Theologie von Frauen im Horizont des Genderdiskurses. Matthias-Grünewald-Verl., Ostfildern 2022, ISBN 978-3-7867-3239-6.
- Editor: Verschieden- im Einssein. Eine interdisziplinäre Untersuchung zu Meister Eckharts Verständnis von Wirklichkeit (= Eckhart. Texts and Studies 7). Peeters Publishers, Leuven 2018, ISBN 978-90-429-3481-8
