= Abelardo Moure =

Spanish javelin thrower

Abelardo Moure García, known as Lardo, born in Puebla del Caramiñal in 1979, is a former javelin thrower, from Galicia, in Spain, who has subsequently coached athletes in the sport. His father, Pepe Moure, founded the Barbanza Athletics and Sports Association in 1984 and, at the age of 5, he was one of the first athletes of this club.

== Athlete ==
Moure began practicing disciplines such as mid-distance and high jump and javelin throwing. In 1993, he accompanied a cousin to compete in a children's trophy in Santiago de Compostela. It was the first time that he threw a javelin in competition and he achieved the minimum mark to attend the Galician athletics championship in Orense. Moure became a self-taught javelin thrower, at a time when the Barbanza region lacked the resources and knowledge to practice it. There he placed third in the 1000 m hurdles, his potential discipline, but "to my surprise and that of my father, I was runner-up in Galicia in the javelin, improving my mark by 8 m." When he became a cadet, he combined middle distance and javelin throwing, until he developed chronic tendinitis.

While the current Riazor stadium was being built in La Coruña, one of the Spanish coaches of this discipline, Raimundo Fernández, began training in a stadium in Puebla where the athletes of the AADB club trained.

== Coach ==
Lardo Moure became a coach at the age of 16. He was the youngest coach at the junior world championship to qualify two athletes for a national team: Ana Peleteiro and Lidia Parada. The first became the junior world triple jump champion. For her part, Parada has won ten consecutive Spanish championships in javelin throwing, in different age categories. In December 2012, Spanish athletics authorities chose triple jumper Peleteiro and her coach Moure as the best junior and best coach, respectively, of the year 2012.
