= Andrés Torres Queiruga =

Galician theologian, writer and translator (born 1940)

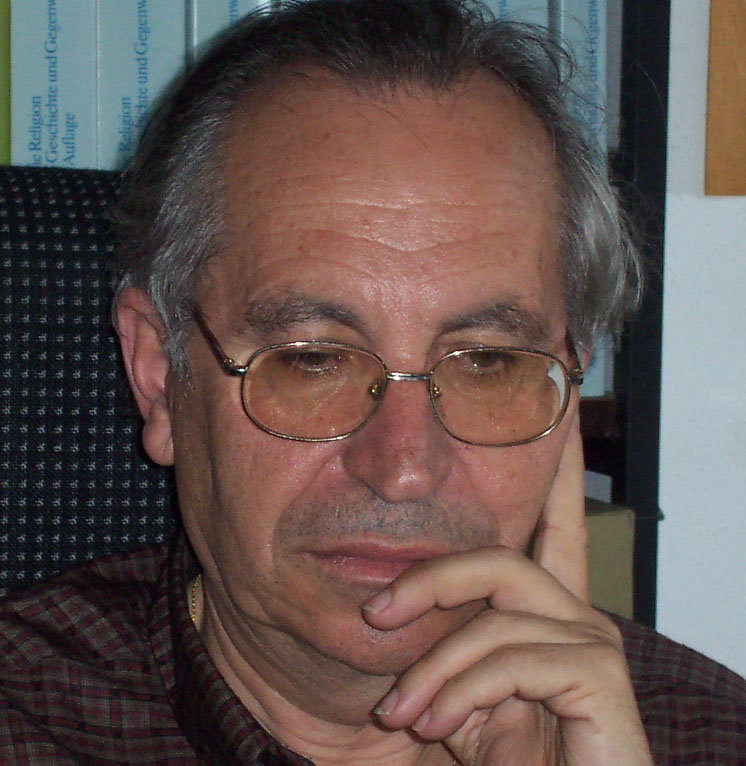
Andrés Torres Queiruga

Andrés Torres Queiruga (born 1940 in Aguiño, Ribeira, Galicia) is a Galician theologian, writer and translator. He is known for some of heterodox beliefs, including the denial in the physical resurrection of Jesus.

He studied in Santiago de Compostela and Comillas Pontifical University. He is a doctor in Theology and Philosophy.

Queiruga lectures Theology at the Instituto Teolóxico compostelá and philosophy of religion at the University of Santiago de Compostela. A member of the Real Academia Galega and the Consello da Cultura Galega, he was a founder of the magazine Encrucillada: Revista Galega de Pensamento Cristián, nowadays he is director of the Asociación Encrucillada. He is a staff member of the magazines Iglesia Viva, Sal Terrae, Revista Portuguesa de Filosofía and Concilium.

== Thought ==
Torres Queiruga takes from Kant the idea of the imaginative mediation of religious faith : faith imagines and idealises contents that have not historically occurred.

In his book The Resurrection without the Risen One, with Rudolph Bultmann and Hegel's Lectures on the Philosophy of Religion, denies that the Resurrection of Jesus is a miracle and a historically occurring fact:

The Resurrection is not only not a miracle, but is not even an empirical event. And faith in the Resurrection does not depend on the fact of whether one accepts or rejects the historical reality of the empty tomb.

— From the cover of The Resurrection without the Risen One

== Works ==
Some of his most important works are:

- Teoloxía e sociedade, Vigo, 1974
- Constitución y evolución del dogma: la teoría de Amor Ruibal y su aportación, Madrid, 1977
- Recupera-la salvación, Vigo, 1977
- Nova aproximación a unha filosofía da saudade, Vigo, 1981
- A revelación como maieútica histórica, Vigo, 1984
- Rolda de ideas, 1984
- A revelación de Deus na realización do home, Vigo, 1985
- Creo en Deus Pai. O Deus de Xesús e a autonomía humana, Vigo, 1986
- Noción, religación, trascendencia. O coñecemento de Deus en Amor Ruibal e Xavier Zubiri, A Coruña, 1990
- Recupera-la creación. Por unha relixión humanizadora, Vigo, 1996
- Fin del cristianismo premoderno. Retos hacia un nuevo horizonte, Santander, 2000
- Repensar a resurrección. A diferencia cristiá na continuidade das relixións e da cultura, Vigo, 2002
- Para unha filosofía da saudade, Ourense, 2003
- signator of the Church 2011 manifesto
