= Kalloch =

Kalloch is a surname. Notable people with the surname include:

- Christina Kalloch (1958–), German theologian, a signator of Church 2011
- Isaac Smith Kalloch (1832–1887), American Baptist minister and politician
- Robert Kalloch (1893–1947), American fashion designer
