= Emilio Rolán =

Spanish physician and malacologist

Emilio Rolán Mosquera
- Born: 1935 (age 90–91); A Guarda, Galicia, Spain
- Education: University of Santiago de Compostela
- Known for: Research on marine molluscs; malacological collections
- Awards: Una Vita per la Malacologia (1999); honorary doctorate from the University of Vigo
- Scientific career
- Fields: Malacology, pediatrics, biology

Emilio Rolán Mosquera (born 1935) is a Spanish physician, biologist and malacologist from Galicia, specialising in the study of molluscs. He worked as a paediatrician before developing a career in malacological research and has described numerous mollusc species. His collection of molluscs was donated to the University of Santiago de Compostela in 2003.

== Career ==
=== Medical career ===
Rolán graduated in medicine and surgery from the University of Santiago de Compostela in 1960. In 1962, he worked as an intern in the university's department of paediatrics and childcare, and served as an assistant in practical paediatrics classes during the 1961–1962 academic year.

In 1963, he obtained the qualification of Médico puericultor del Estado (state-certified childcare physician) in Madrid, followed in 1964 by a specialist qualification in paediatrics and childcare.

From 1966, he worked as a paediatrician under Spain's former Compulsory Sickness Insurance system, including in A Pobra do Caramiñal. From 1974 to 1985, he headed the paediatrics service of the Instituto Social de la Marina in Vigo. He subsequently headed the paediatrics service at POVISA hospital in Vigo from 1978 to 1999.

Rolán also held academic appointments. From 1989 to 1996, he was an associate professor in health sciences at the Faculty of Medicine of the University of Santiago de Compostela. During the 1992–1993 academic year, he taught research methodology at the University School of Nursing in Vigo, where he later taught paediatric nursing from 1993 to 2003.

=== Malacological research ===
While working as a paediatrician, Rolán developed an interest in molluscs by chance. He began collecting shells while working in A Pobra do Caramiñal and, after reading a medical magazine article about a shell collector seeking specimens from the Atlantic Ocean, sent that collector a batch of shells. In return, he received a collection of Mediterranean shells, which sparked his interest in conchology.

After returning to Vigo in 1965, he continued building his collection, which eventually grew to include more than 25,000 catalogued lots, alongside substantial additional material awaiting study. The collection is estimated to contain more than two million shells and specimens, many gathered by Rolán himself during expeditions and field trips in numerous countries. His work as a malacological researcher developed particularly after a trip to Cape Verde around 1978.

Rolán published his first scientific paper in 1980. His research subsequently focused increasingly on the taxonomy and description of molluscs rather than solely on collecting specimens from seas and rivers. He received a doctorate in biology from the University of Santiago de Compostela in 1992. His doctoral thesis was entitled La familia Conidae en el Archipiélago de Cabo Verde (The family Conidae in the Cape Verde archipelago).

His research has been informed by more than 60 trips to 35 countries and participation in over 20 scientific expeditions, particularly in Cuba and Cape Verde. His taxonomic work has resulted in the description of numerous species. Among those named by him are Onoba vigoensis, named after Vigo; Onoba galaica, referring to Galicia; and Onoba breogani, named after the legendary Galician figure Breogán.

He has published numerous books and scientific papers, principally on malacology, as well as work relating to paediatrics.

In 2003, Rolán signed an agreement with the University of Santiago de Compostela donating his collection to the institution. The specimens were intended to become part of the university's Museum of Natural History.

== Malacological organisations and activities ==
=== Memberships ===
Rolán has been associated with a number of scientific and malacological societies, including:

- Sociedad Española de Ciencias Naturales.
- Spanish Malacological Society (founding member).
- Conchological Society of Great Britain and Ireland.
- Società Italiana di Malacologia, formerly the Unione Malacologica Italiana.
- Portuguese Malacological Society.
- Hawaiian Malacological Society.
- Sociedade Galega de Historia Natural.
- Asociación Naturalista Bajo Miño.
- Associazione Malacologica Internazionale.
- Belgian Society for Conchology.

=== Positions and scientific service ===
His professional activities in malacology have included:

- Member of the board of the Spanish Malacological Society, 1988–1992.
- Editor of the society's journal Noticiario de la SEM, from 1990.
- President of the Spanish Malacological Society, December 1992–October 2005.
- Vice-president of the Spanish Malacological Society from October 2005.
- Chairman of the organising committee of the Fifth National Congress of Malacology, held in Vigo in September 1984.
- Manager of the Museo Galego do Mar in Vigo, 1994–1998.
- Member of the advisory board of Argonauta, the journal of the Associazione Malacologica Internazionale, 1994–1999.
- Member of the organising and scientific committees of the Twelfth International Malacological Congress, held in Vigo in September 1995; he also co-edited its book of abstracts.
- Member of the organising committee of the Twelfth National Congress of Malacology, held in Málaga from 22 to 26 September 1998.
- Editor of Argonauta, 1999–2001.
- Invited participant at the Third International Workshop of Malacology in Menfi, Sicily, in June 2000.
- Member of the organising committee of the First Joint Congress of Mediterranean Malacological Societies, held in Genoa in November 2000.
- Member of the scientific committee and vice-chairman of the organising committee of the Second International Congress of European Malacological Societies, held in Vigo in September 2002.
- Invited participant in a workshop on European fauna held in Madrid in September 2002 and organised by the MNHN, ZMUC, ZMA and MNCN museums.
- Researcher ad honorem at the Museum of Natural History of the University of Santiago de Compostela, appointed in December 2003.
- Member of the scientific committee of the Fourth International Congress of European Malacological Societies, held in Naples in October 2005.
- Member of the scientific committee of the Fifth International Congress of European Malacological Societies, held in Naples in 2005.
- Reviewer of scientific papers for journals including Thalassas, Iberus, Ophelia, Apex, Nova Acta Científica Compostelana (Bioloxía), Argonauta, Bollettino Malacologico, Strombus and Zoosystema.

== Selected publications ==
Rolán's publications include works on the taxonomy, ecology and distribution of marine molluscs, particularly species from the eastern Atlantic and the Cape Verde archipelago.

- Rolán Mosquera, E. (1980). "Descripción de tres nuevas especies del género Conus Linné, 1758 (Mollusca: Gastropoda), procedentes del Archipiélago de Cabo Verde". Bollettino Malacologico 16 (3–4): 79–94.
- Rolán Mosquera, E. & Pedrosa, G. P. G. (1981). "Molluschi raccolti sul banco di Galizia". La Conchiglia 13 (150–151): 6–7, 10, 15.
- Rolán Mosquera, E. (1983). Moluscos de la ría de Vigo 1. Gasterópodos. Thalassas 1 (1), supplement 1: 1–383. ISBN 84-300-8957-84.
- Rolán, E., Röckel, D. & Monteiro, A. A. (1983). "New observations on Cape Verde cones, II". La Conchiglia 15 (174–175): 16–17.
- Rolán, E., Rolán Álvarez, E. & Ortea, J. (1992). "Sobre la captura en Galicia (NO de España) de Tritonia hombergi Cuvier, 1803 y Babakina anadoni (Ortea, 1979) comb. nov. (Mollusca: Nudibranchia)". Iberus 10 (1): 113–117.
- Rolán, E. (1993). Guía ecolóxica das cunchas e moluscos de Galicia. Vigo: Xerais. ISBN 84-7507-608-X.
- Rolán, E., Otero-Schmitt, J. & Fernandes, F. (1994). "El género Bactrocythara (Gastropoda: Turridae: Mangeliinae) en África Occidental, con descripción de una nueva especie". Bollettino Malacologico 29: 243–284.
- Rolán, E. & Otero-Schmitt, J. (1996). Guía dos moluscos de Galicia. Vigo: Galaxia. ISBN 95-8288-072-1.
- Rolán-Álvarez, E. & Rolán, E. (1995). "Applicability of the biological species concept in taxonomy: the example of Littorina saxatilis (Gastropoda: Prosobranchia)". Argonauta 9 (1–6): 1–8.
- Rolán, E., Monteiro, A. & Fernandes, C. (1998). "Cone shells from Cape Verde Island: new developments, with description of a new species". La Conchiglia 30 (286): 36–44.
- Rolán, E., Otero-Schmitt, J. & Fernandes, F. (1998). "The family Turridae s. l. (Mollusca, Neogastropoda) in Angola (West Africa). 1. Subfamily Daphnellinae". Iberus 16: 95–118.
- Rolán, E., Rubio, F. & Ryall, P. (2000). "A new species of Teinostoma (Mollusca, Gastropoda, Vitrinellidae) from Ghana (W. Africa)". Argonauta 13 (2): 81–82.
- Rolán, E. & Rubio, F. (2001). "New species of the genera Elachisina and Rissoella (Mollusca, Gastropoda) from the Cape Verde Archipelago". Novapex 2 (4): 133–136.
- Rolán, E., Hernández, J. M. & Déniz, F. (2005). "Description of two new species of the genus Solariella (Gastropoda, Trochidae) from Canary and Mauritania". Visaya 5: 4–11.
- Rolán, E., Ryall, P. & Horro, J. (2007). "Two new species of the genera Crassispira and Agladrillia (Gastropoda, Conoidea) from Angola". Neptunea 6 (3): 25–31.
- Rolán, E. (2008). "The genus Onoba (Mollusca, Caenogastropoda, Rissoidae) from NW Spain, with the description of two new species". Zoosymposia 1: 233–245.
- Rolán, E., Ryall, P. & Horro, J. (2008). "Notes on West African Perrona (Gastropoda: Clavatulidae) with the description of a new species". Iberus 26 (1): 5–16.
- Rolán, E., Fernández-Garcés, R. & Lee, H. G. (2009). "The genus Stosicia in the Caribbean (Caenogastropoda, Rissoidae) with the description of a new species". Basteria 73 (1–3): 1–8.
- Rolán, E., González-Porto, M. & de Matos-Pita, S. (2009). "The genus Callumbonella (Gastropoda, Trochacea), with description of a new species from Namibia". Journal of Conchology 39 (6): 634–657.
- Rolán, E. (2010). "A new species of the genus Aroapyrgus (Prosobranchia, Cochliopinae) from Guatemala". Gloria Maris 49 (2): 48–53.
- Rolán, E., Fernández-Garcés, R. & Lee, H. G. (2010). "A new species of Mitromica (Gastropoda: Costellariidae) from Nicaragua". Novapex 11 (4): 119–121.
- Rolán, E., Fernández-Garcés, R. & Redfern, C. (2012). "New records and description of four new species of the genus Agathotoma (Gastropoda, Mangeliidae) in the Caribbean". Novapex 13 (2): 45–62.
- Rolán, E., Fernández-Garcés, R. & Rubio, F. (2013). "A new species of Murchisonella (Heterobranchia: Murchisonellidae) from Cuba". Novapex 14 (1): 17–19.
- Trigo, J. E. et al. (2018). Guía de los Moluscos Marinos de Galicia. Edited by J. S. Troncoso, J. E. Trigo and E. Rolán. Vigo: Servizo de Publicacións da Universidade de Vigo. 836 pp. ISBN 978-84-8158-787-6.

== Honours and recognition ==
- Honorary member of the Societat Catalana de Malacologia from April 1999.
- Recipient of the international Una Vita per la Malacologia award in 1999, presented in Cupra Marittima, Ascoli Piceno, Italy. The award recognises individuals for their contributions to malacological research.
- Awarded an honorary doctorate by the University of Vigo.

=== Species named in his honour ===
In 1990, malacologists Anders Warén and Philippe Bouchet named a species of monoplacophoran mollusc Laevipilina rolani in his honour.

== Taxonomic author abbreviation ==
The standard taxonomic author abbreviation Rolán is used to indicate Emilio Rolán Mosquera as the author of a zoological taxon description.
