= Johannes Beutler =

German theologian and priest (1933–2024)

The Reverend Johannes Beutler
- Beutler in the 1990s
- Born: 3 October 1933; Hamburg, German Reich
- Died: 6 November 2024 (aged 91); Berlin, Germany
- Occupations: Theologian; Priest; Rector
- Organizations: Sankt Georgen Graduate School of Philosophy and Theology; Pontifical Gregorian University; Pontifical Biblical Institute

Johannes Beutler SJ (3 October 1933 – 6 November 2024) was a German theologian and Catholic priest. Focused on the Gospel of John, he taught at Sankt Georgen Graduate School of Philosophy and Theology, the Pontifical Gregorian University, and the Pontifical Biblical Institute.

== Biography ==
Beutler was born in Hamburg on 3 October 1933, the third of four children of a family of teachers. After his Abitur, achieved in 1952, he became a candidate for priesthood in the Diocese of Osnabrück and studied philosophy at the Sankt Georgen Graduate School of Philosophy and Theology in Frankfurt. He joined the Society of Jesus as a novice in Eringerfeld near Paderborn in 1954. He studied philosophy further at the Berchmanskolleg in Pullach from 1956 to 1958, and then worked for two years as an educator at the Aloisiuskolleg in Bad Godesberg. He then studied theology in Frankfurt from 1960 to 1964, where he was ordained as a priest at the Frankfurt Cathedral by Bishop Kempf in 1963. He was trained in Jesuit matters in Wéplon, Belgium, and completed his studies in Rome from 1965 to 1971, with a PhD in Frankfurt in 1972.

Beutler taught theology at Sankt Georgen and focused on theology of the New Testament and fundamental theology. He was appointed professor of New Testament in 1974. He served at the institute's rector twice, from 1978 to 1982 and from 1992 to 1996. He also taught as a guest, including in Bolivia, Colombia, Mexico and Nigeria.

Beutler was a member of the Pontifical Biblical Commission in Rome from 1993 to 2001. He was appointed vice-rector of the Pontifical Gregorian University in Rome in 1998 and taught as a professor at the Pontifical Bible Institute from 2001 to 2007. He specialized in the Gospel of John and the Johannine epistles.

As emeritus, Beutler returned to Frankfurt to focus on writing and pastoral work. He was chaplain of the Jugendbund Neudeutschland youth organisation and signed the memorandum "Kirche 2011 : Ein notwendiger Aufbruch". His knowledge of several languages helped him to minister to foreign-language congregations in Frankfurt. He was also a priest for imprisoned people, at the Opus Spiritus Sanci in Königstein-Mammolshain and in internal Jesuit education. He moved to the Peter-Faber-Haus in Berlin-Kladow in 2023. Beutler died there on 6 November 2024, at the age of 91.

== Publications ==
Dissertation

- Beutler, Johannes (1972). Martyria: traditionsgeschichtliche Untersuchungen zum Zeugnisthema bei Johannes. Frankfurt am Main: J. Knecht. ISBN 978-3-7820-0253-0. OCLC 896517116.

In German

- Beutler, Johannes (1998). Studien zu den johanneischen Schriften (in German). Stuttgart: Verl. Kath. Bibelwerk. ISBN 978-3-460-06251-1.
- —— (2012). Neue Studien zu den johanneischen Schriften: = New studies on the Johannine writings (in German). Göttingen: V & R Unipress, Bonn Univ. Press. ISBN 978-3-89971-921-5.
- —— (2013). Das Johannesevangelium (in German). Freiburg Basel Wien: Herder. ISBN 978-3-451-30779-9.
- —— (2000). Regensburger Neues Testament. 16: Die Johannesbriefe / übers. und erkl. von Johannes Beutler (in German). Regensburg: Pustet. ISBN 978-3-7917-1657-2.
- —— (2023). SBAB NT 75 Leben in Fülle (in German). Stuttgart: Kbw Bibelwerk. ISBN 978-3-460-06751-6.

In French

- Beutler, Johannes; Morales, Xavier; Schlegel, Jean-Louis (2023). L'Évangile de Jean: commentaire (in French). Bruxelles Paris: Éditions jésuites. ISBN 978-2-494374-11-9.

In English

- Beutler, Johannes (2017). A Commentary on the Gospel of John. Grand Rapids, Michigan: Wm. B. Eerdmans Publishing. ISBN 978-0-8028-7336-1.
- —— (2023). Letters of John. Translated and Interpreted. Rome: Gregorian & Biblical press. ISBN 979-12-5986-026-2.
