= Ribeira, Galicia =

Ribeira
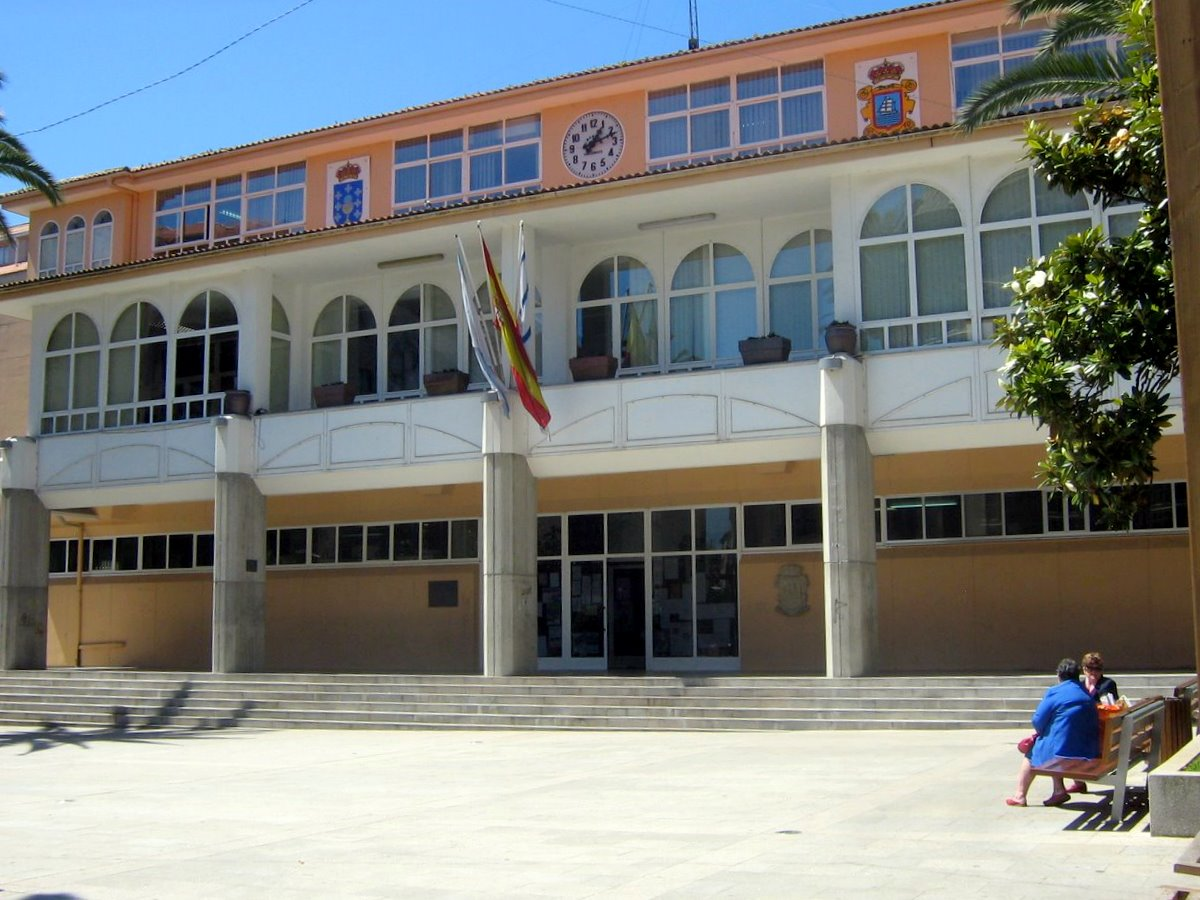

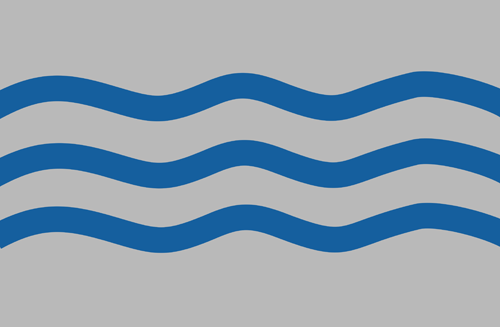
- Flag Coat of arms

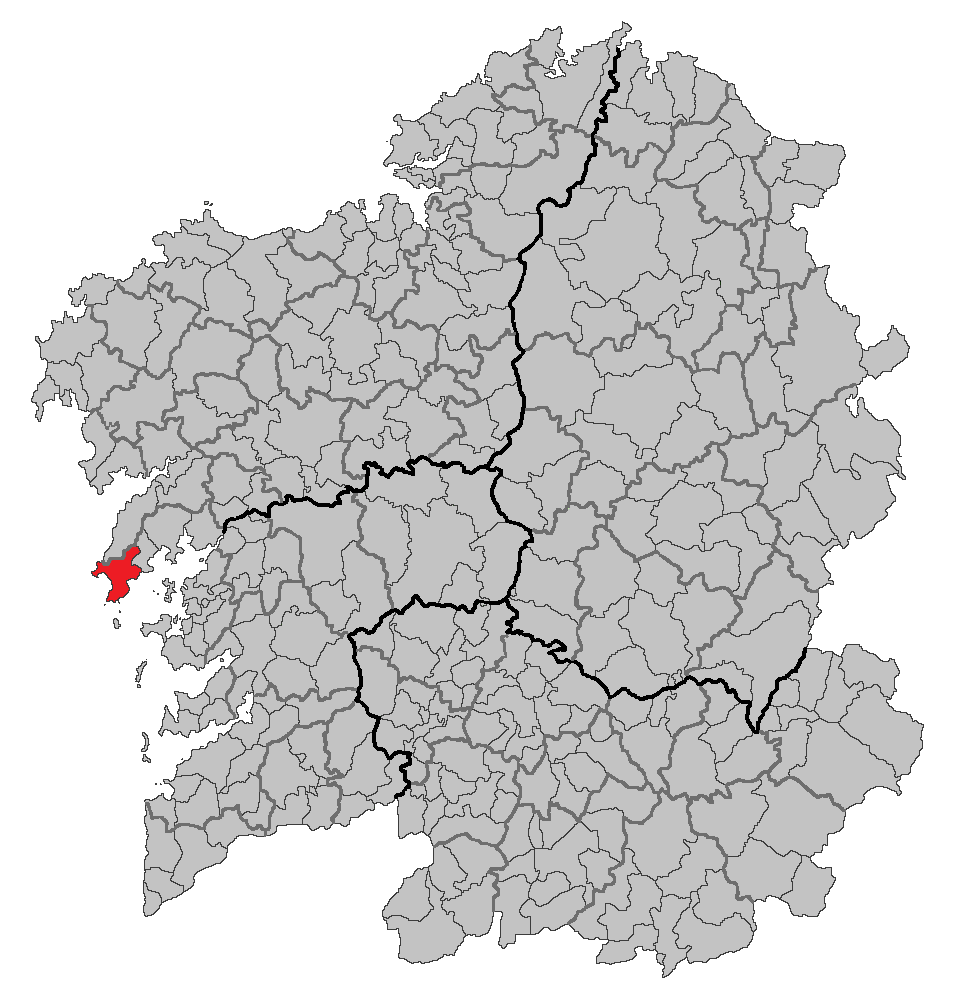
- Location of Ribeira within Galicia
- Coordinates: 42°34′N 8°59′W
- Country: Spain
- Autonomous community: Galicia
- Province: A Coruña
- County: A Barbanza
- Parishes: Aguiño, Artes, Carreira, Castiñeiras, Corrubedo, Oleiros, Olveira, Palmeira, Ribeira

Government
  - Type: Mayor–council government
  - Body: Concello de Ribeira
  - Mayor: María José Sampedro Fernández (PPdeG)

Area
  - Total: 65.1 km^{2} (25.1 sq mi)

Population (2025-01-01)
  - Total: 27,102
- Time zone: UTC+1 (CET)
  - Summer (DST): UTC+1 (CEST)
- Website: www.ribeira.gal

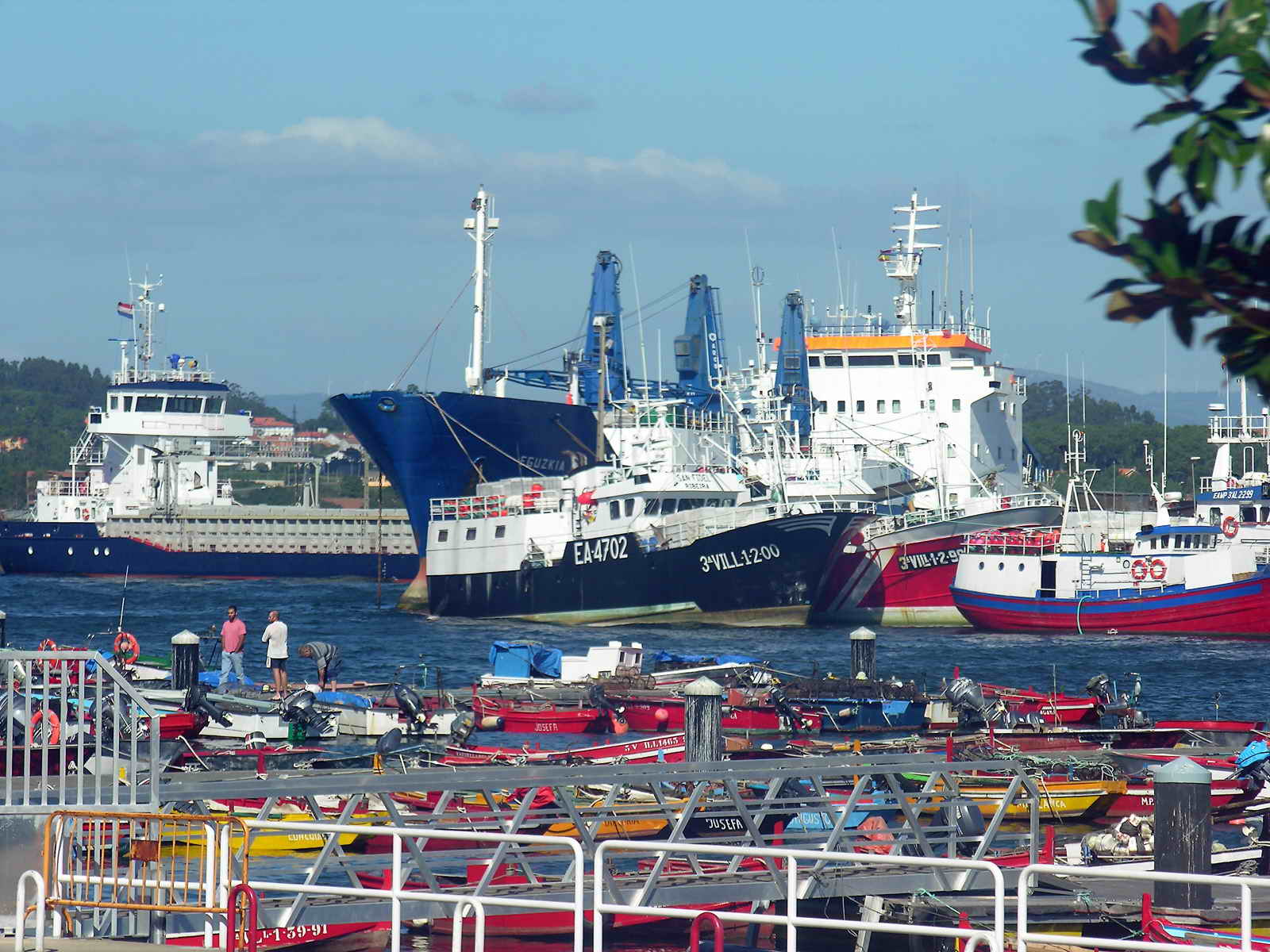
Port of Ribeira

Ribeira is the capital of the comarca of Barbanza, in the province of A Coruña in the autonomous community of Galicia in northwestern Spain. The capital and most populous urban center is Santa Uxía de Ribeira. Another of its major points is the center of San Martin de Oleiros. The municipality is administratively divided into nine civil parishes: Aguiño, Artes, Carreira, Castiñeiras, Corrubedo, Oleiros, Olveira, Palmeira and Ribeira.

It is one of the most southerly municipalities of the province. It borders the municipalities of A Pobra do Caramiñal and Porto do Son. It has one of the most important inshore fishing ports in the province. Also within the municipality, tuna that is destined for canning is unloaded for manufacturing companies.

It has important administrative services provided to the population that nourishes the municipality, such as the local delegation of the Treasury and three Courts of First Instance and Instruction.

== Toponymy ==
Ribeira is a Galician word, from Latin ripariam, meaning 'bank' or 'shore'. This form was first attested in 1387: Santa Ougea de Ribeira. On the other hand, Uxía, Old Galician Ougia, is the local evolution of the name Eugenia; hence Santa Uxía means Saint Eugenia. The local church of Saint Eugenia is first recorded in a document dated in 1200, as Sancte Eugenie de Carraria.

== History ==
Traces of the Atlantic megalithic culture in Riberia can be found at the Dolmen de Axeitos and the Pedra das Cabras petroglyph.

Until the 17th century, Ribeira's port was of little importance on the region, partly due to several incursions of vikings, saracens and pirates from the 11th to 18th centuries. Nevertheless, it grew constantly to become one of Galicia's most important fishing ports towards the late 18th century. At that time businessmen of Catalonia arrived in Ribeira and created a successful salting fish industry. King Alfonso XIII granted Ribeira the title of City in 1906.

== Economy ==
Economically, Ribeira is very dependent on the sea and it constitutes one of the most important shallow-water fishing ports in Spain. Cultivation of mussels and turbot represents an important source of income. The town also has splendid expectations facing the increase of tourism.

== Demographics ==
The population totals 28,000, nearly 14,000 in Santa Uxía, main urban nucleus and parish. There is a significant number of people settled abroad, mainly in Newark, New Jersey, Harrison, New Jersey, Carteret, New Jersey, and Lyndhurst, New Jersey.

== Tourism ==
In recent years the tourism industry has set their sights on the Barbanzana capital.

Traces of the past can be cherished by visiting the Dolmen de Axeitos or "The Parthenon of Megalithic" as described by the late official chronicler of the municipality, Carlos Garcia Bayon. The remains of Celtic culture and forts are dotted throughout the Riveira territory along with petroglyphs for cultural tourists seeking a peek into the past.

The natural park of the Dunes and lagoons Carregal Corrubedo and Vixán (Dune Corrubedo) offer visitors, among other peculiarities, 1000 hectares of park and 5 kilometers of coastline. It should be mentioned that the largest moving dune in the northwest peninsular is here that is 1.2 kilometers in length and no less than 15 meters in height.

Another main tourist attraction in Ribeira is 'Festa da Dorna', a major event taking place one week prior to the 24th of July (which is a local holiday and the biggest day of the event). It has been taking place since 1948 and it was declared a Galician Festival of Tourist Interest in 2005. There are several fun activities taking place during the days that it is celebrate. People organize themselves in groups called "peñas", identified by colorful t-shirts and fun names related to the sea life.

== Gastronomy ==
The municipality is located at the mouth of the Ria de Arousa, which boasts of being the most productive shellfish area in Spain. Ribeira is one of the first inshore fishing ports so it can be said that its cuisine is intimately linked to the sea.

== Notable people ==
- Ana Peleteiro, athlete
- Andrés Torres Queiruga, theologian and writer

== See also ==
List of municipalities in A Coruña
