= Dolmen de Axeitos =

Cultural landmark in Ribeira, Spain

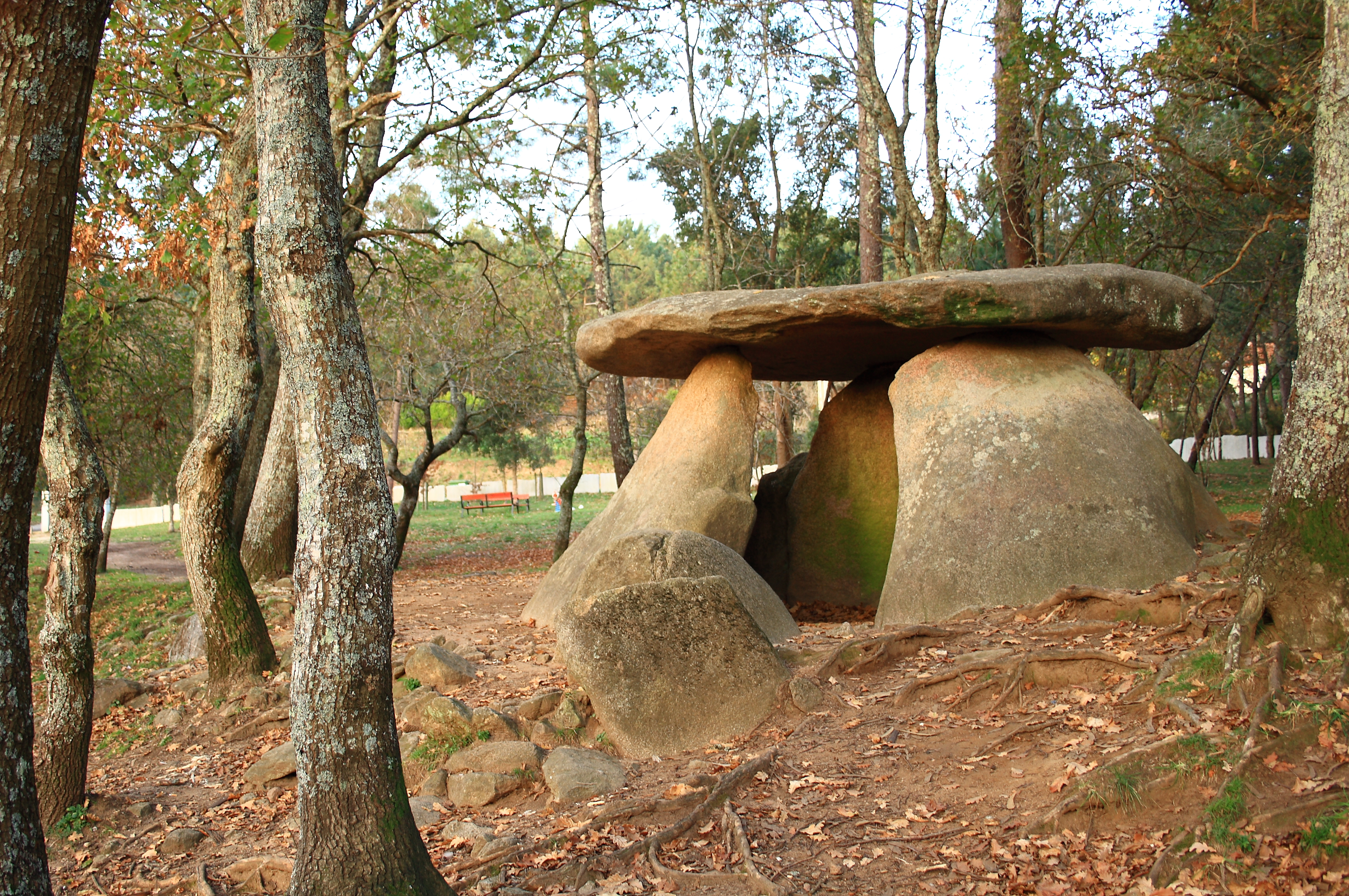
- The dolmen in 2008

- Location within Galicia

General information
- Location: Galicia, Spain
- Coordinates: 42°36′00″N 9°01′01″W
- Year built: c. 3800 BC

Technical details
- Material: Stone

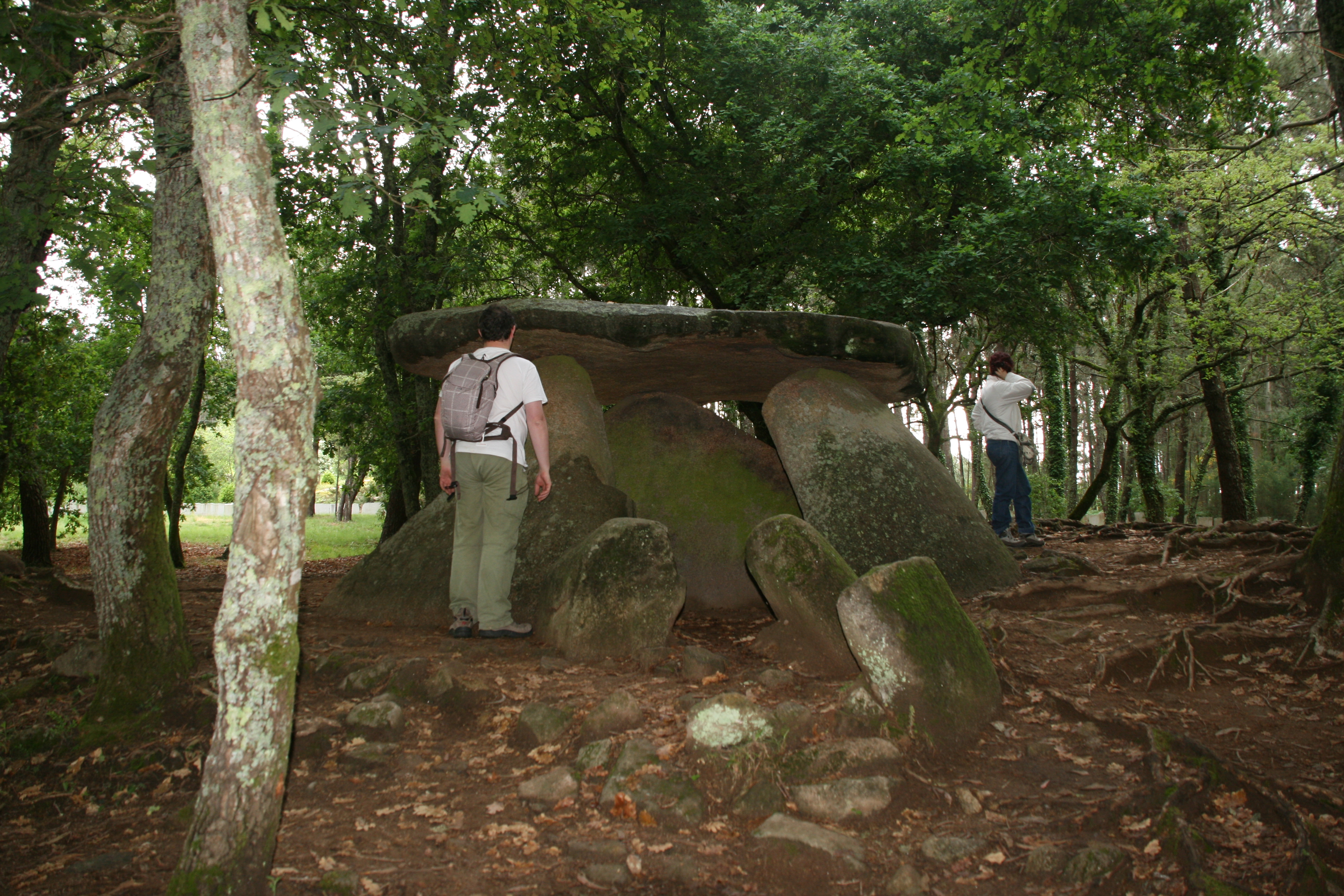

Dolmen de Axeitos is a prehistoric megalithic dolmen just to the northwest of the village Axeitos, in the parish of Oleiros, in the municipality of Ribeira, on the Barbanza Peninsula in the estuary of the Ría de Arousa in the Province of A Coruña, Galicia, in northwestern Spain. It is dated to 3600-4000 BC. Because of its historical and archaeological value, on March 11, 1978 it became a registered Bien de Interés Cultural landmark.
