= Rudolf Höfer =

Austrian physician (1923 – 2023)

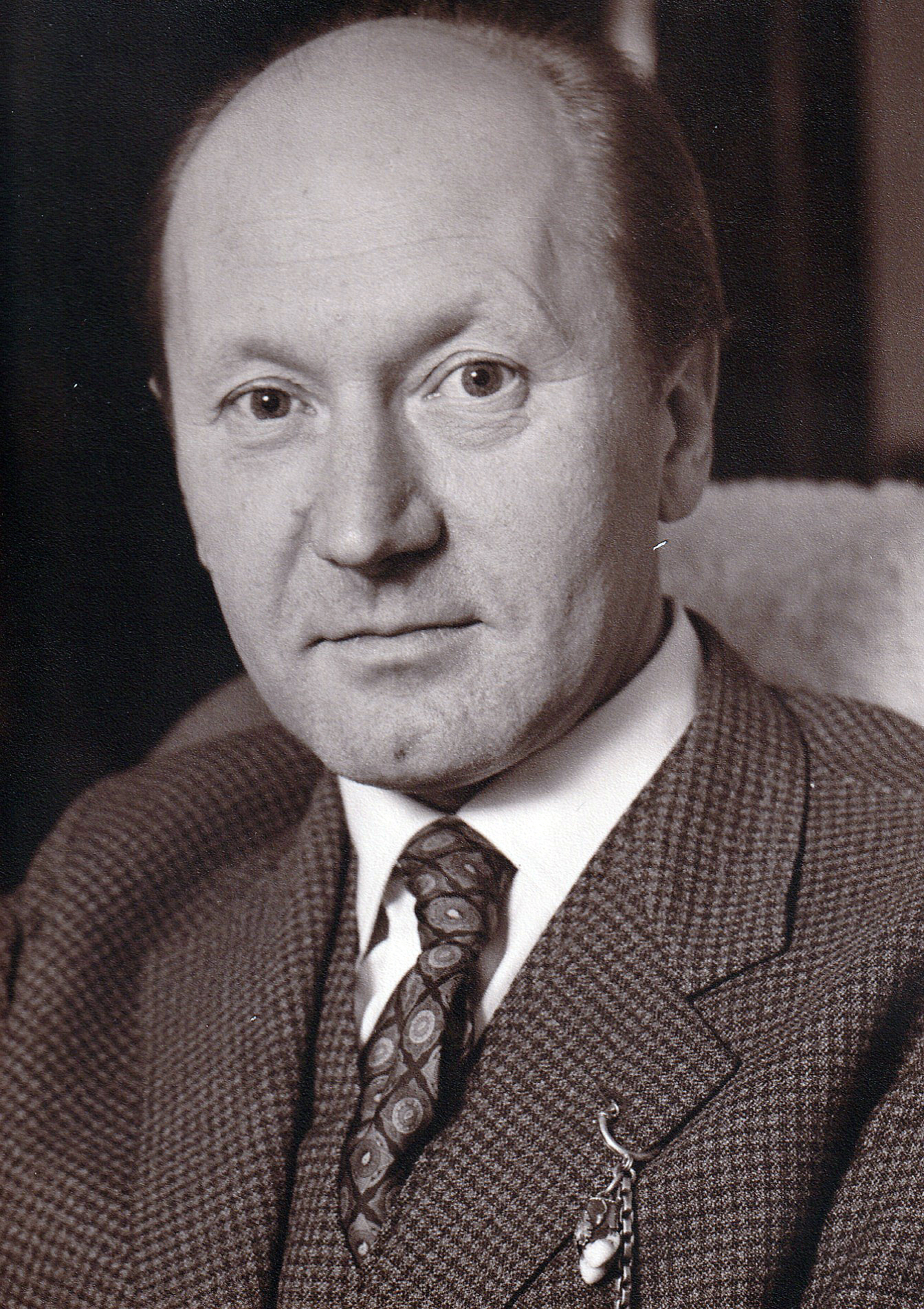
- Höfer, circa 1970
- Born: 18 March 1923; Vienna, Austria
- Died: 9 November 2023 (aged 100); Vienna, Austria
- Resting place: Hietzing Cemetery

Rudolf Höfer (18 March 1923 – 9 November 2023) was an Austrian nuclear medicine physician, internist, and thyroid expert. As the first professor of nuclear medicine at the University of Vienna and a representative of the International Atomic Energy Agency, he played a pivotal role in advancing nuclear medicine as a field in Europe.

== Biography ==
=== Life and education ===
Rudolf Höfer was born to surgeon and later chief physician (Primar) Rudolf Höfer (1886–1962), originally from Cieszyn (Teschen), and Editha Demel-Elswehr (1888–1957), the daughter of a Viennese ministry official. He grew up in Vienna-Hietzing, attended the Theresian Academy's Realgymnasium and the secondary school at Stubenring in Vienna’s inner district, graduating in 1941. After one semester of medical studies at the University of Vienna, he was drafted into military service in North Africa, where he was taken as a prisoner of war by U.S. forces. Released in 1946, he resumed his studies in Vienna and earned his doctorate in general medicine in July 1953. Following a brief stint in the pathology department at the Rudolfstiftung Hospital, he joined the Second Medical University Clinic (Zweite Medizinische Universitätsklinik) of the City of Vienna, under the direction of his later mentor, Karl Fellinger (1904–2000).

=== Research and teaching ===
During his studies, Rudolf Höfer met physician Herbert Vetter (1920–2009), who sparked his interest in the emerging field of nuclear medicine. Together, they established an isotope laboratory at the Second Medical University Clinic in the 1950s, significantly contributing to the clinical application of radioisotopes for therapeutic and diagnostic purposes in Austria. In 1956/57, Höfer spent time at the University of California, San Francisco and Berkeley as a Fulbright Scholar, followed by a research stay at the Medical School in London in 1961.

After Vetter transitioned to the International Atomic Energy Agency, Höfer assumed leadership of the isotope laboratory in 1958. His scientific work focused on the research, diagnosis, and treatment of thyroid diseases. Additionally, he developed methods for renal scintigraphy, brain tumor diagnostics, and liver perfusion measurement using radiocolloids. This research led to his habilitation in internal medicine in 1966. In 1973, the isotope laboratory was reorganized into an independent department, with Höfer appointed as its head and an associate professor. In 1983, he became the first full professor of nuclear medicine at the University of Vienna. He served as spokesperson for the professorial committee (Professorenkurie) and as vice dean of the Medical Faculty in 1992/93. As a member of the building commission for the "New General Hospital of Vienna", Höfer played a crucial role in designing one of Europe's best-equipped university clinics for nuclear medicine and oversaw its move to the new facility in 1992. He remained head of the university clinic for nuclear medicine until his retirement in 1993.

Höfer served as secretary and president (1972–1978) of the Austrian Society for Nuclear Medicine. Alongside Karl Fellinger and Herbert Vetter, he founded the international conference series "Radioactive Isotopes in Clinical Medicine and Research" in Bad Gastein, which he co-organized from 1954 to 1993. This event became one of the leading international conferences in the field of diagnostic and therapeutic applications of radioisotopes. A notable feature of the symposium was the regular participation of scientists from Eastern Europe, which was facilitated by Austria’s neutral status during the Cold War.

In 1972, Höfer led preliminary negotiations for establishing the European Nuclear Medicine Society (ENMS). The society was formally founded in June 1974 in Clermont-Ferrand, where Höfer was appointed its first secretary and treasurer.

Additionally, on behalf of the International Atomic Energy Agency, Höfer contributed to setting up isotope units in Tunis, Cairo, Bucharest, Tirana, Syria, and Sudan. He also played a role in developing international training guidelines for aspiring nuclear medicine specialists.

=== Personal life ===
In 1953, Höfer married art historian Inge Wegleiter (1926–2005). He was buried Hietzing Cemetery.

== Honours and legacy ==
On the occasion of his 90th birthday, a commemorative plaque was installed at the Vienna University Clinic for Nuclear Medicine, which at the time was led by his former student, Helmut Sinzinger.

In his honour, the Rudolf Höfer Prize was awarded for the first time on 29 April 2015 by the Society of Physicians in Vienna. This annual award recognises the best publication related to the "application of radioactive isotopes in clinical medicine and research" in Austria.

Höfer was a recipient of the Golden Decoration of Honour for Services to the Province of Vienna (1988) and an honorary member of numerous scientific organisations, including the Society of Physicians in Vienna and the Austrian Society for Nuclear Medicine and Molecular Imaging.
