= Fauth =

Fauth is a surname. Notable people with the surname include:

- Evelyn Fauth (born 1976), Austrian tennis player
- Gerald Fauth, American consultant and government official
- Gerhard Fauth (1915–2003), German journalist
- Julian Fauth, Canadian blues pianist, singer and songwriter
- Jürgen Fauth (born 1969), German-American film critic, translator, editor, photographer, and author
