= A Barbanza =

Coordinates: 42°36′50″N 8°54′24″W

- Comarca
- Flag Coat of arms
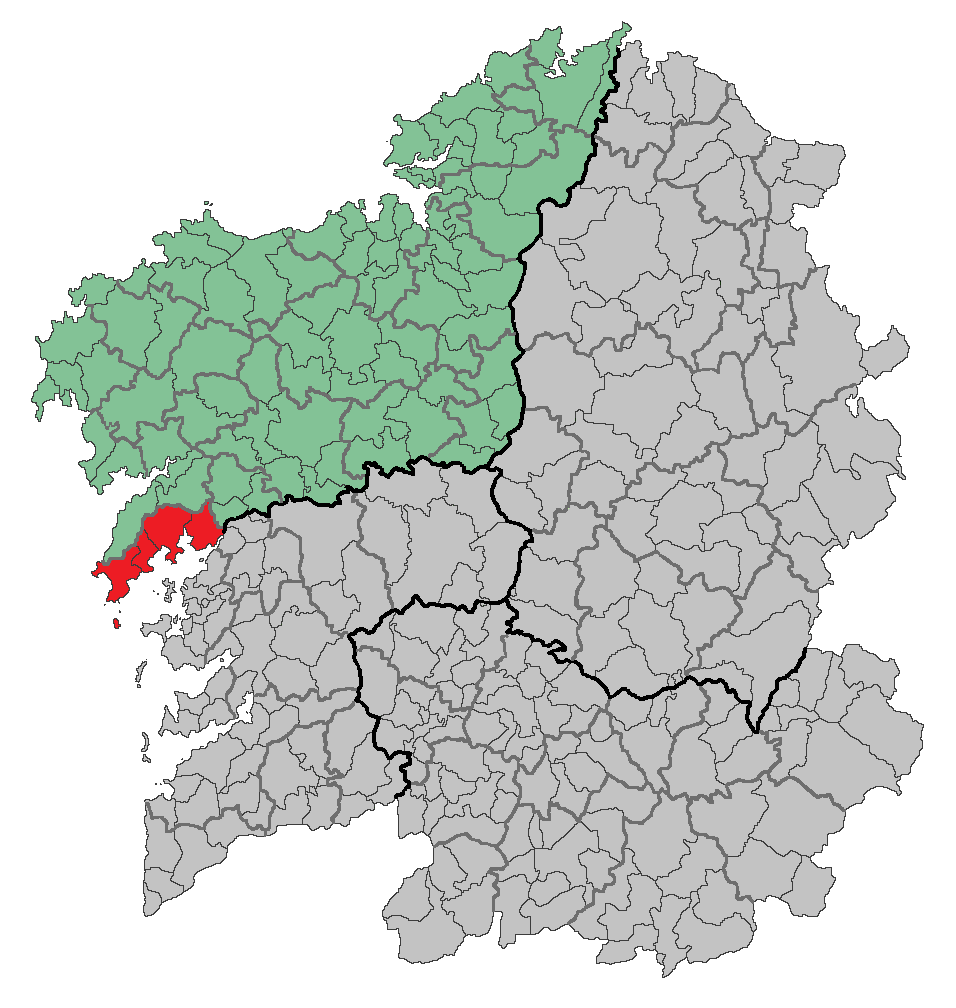
- Country: Spain
- Autonomous community: Galicia
- Province: A Coruña
- Capital: Ribeira
- Municipalities: List: A Pobra do Caramiñal, Boiro, Rianxo, Ribeira

Area
  - Total: 244.2 km^{2} (94.3 sq mi)

Population (2019)
  - Total: 66,095
  - Density: 270.7/km^{2} (701.0/sq mi)
- Demonym: barbanzano
- Time zone: UTC+1 (CET)
  - Summer (DST): UTC+2 (CEST)

A Barbanza is a comarca in the province of A Coruña, Galicia, Spain. Its capital is the municipality of Ribeira. The comarca contains four municipalities and 66,095 inhabitants (2019) in an area of 244.2 km^{2} (94.3 sq mi). These municipalities are:

- A Pobra do Caramiñal
- Boiro
- Rianxo
- Ribeira
