= Otto Hermann Pesch =

German Roman Catholic theologian

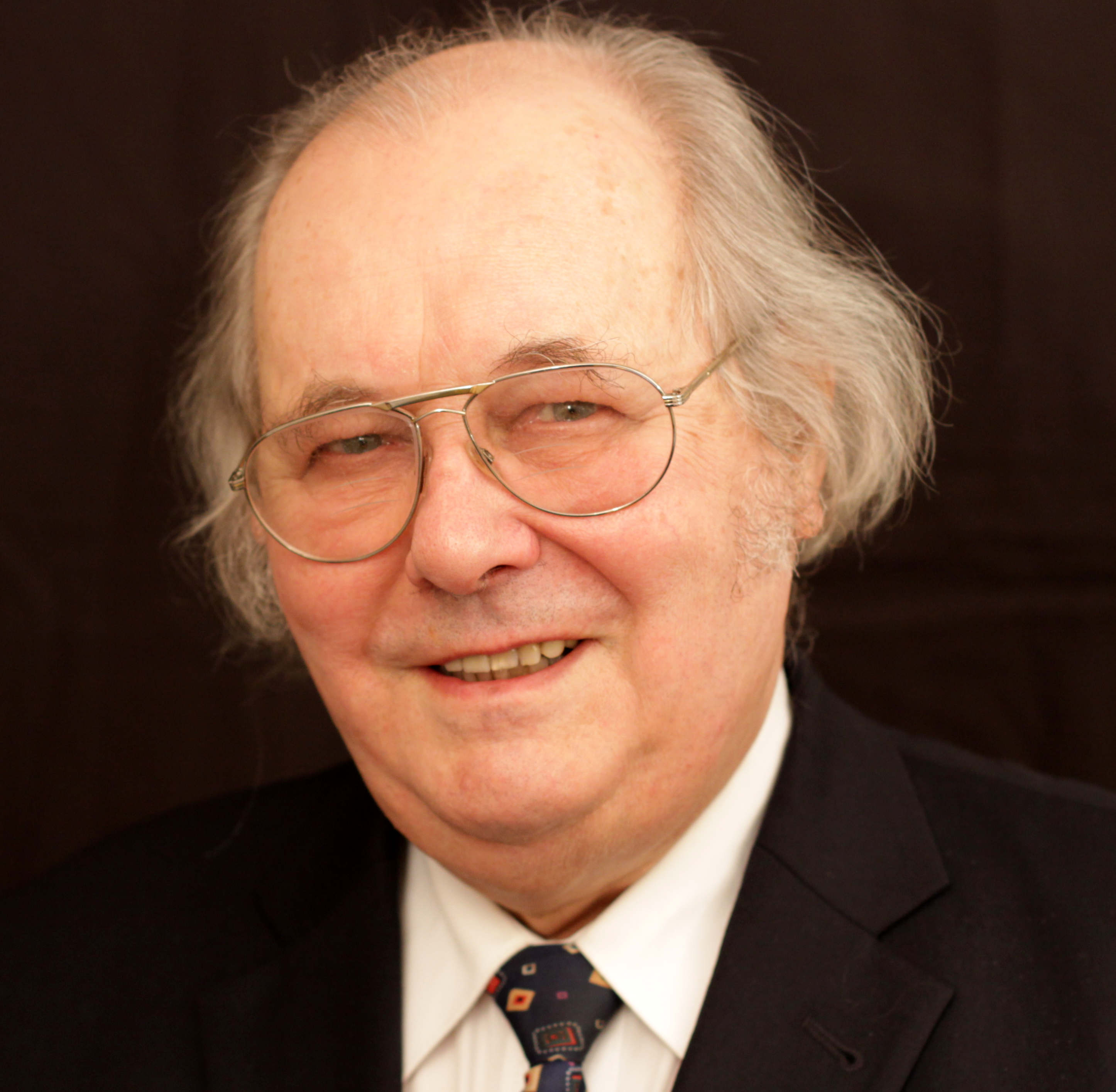
Otto Hermann Pesch

Otto Hermann Pesch (8 October 1931 in Köln – 8 September 2014) was a German Roman Catholic theologian.

Pesch became member of the Dominican order 1952 and was ordained priest 1958, but 1972 left the order and was married. From 1975 to 1998 he was a professor of systematic theology in the University of Hamburg, as a Roman Catholic in a Protestant department of theology. As an ecumenical theologian Pesch was a disciple of Heinrich Fries. He made his doctoral thesis 1965 about doctrine of justification comparing Martin Luther and Thomas Aquinas.

Pesch coupled with the kontroverstheologie (opposing theology), a mainly German theological movement born in the 18th century and characterized by an opposite point of view than that of the Council of Trent's theology. From 1975 to 1997 Pesch taught Systematik und Kontroverstheologie (systematic theology and theology of the Controverse movement) at the Evangelical Department of Theology of the University of Hamburg.

== Works in English ==
- Twenty Years of Catholic Luther Research. LWF 1966
- The God Question in Thomas Aquinas and Luther. Fortress Press 1970
- Questions and Answers: A Shorter Catholic Catechism. Franciscan Herald Press 1976
- What Big Ears You Have! The Theologians' Red Riding Hood.
- The Ecumenical Potential of the Second Vatican Council. Marquette University Press 2006
- The Second Vatican Council: Prehistory – Event – Results – Posthistory. Marquette University Press, 2014
