= Bernd Jochen Hilberath =

German Roman Catholic theologian (born 1948)

Bernd Jochen Hilberath (born 29 June 1948 in Bingen am Rhein, Germany) is a German Roman Catholic theologian.

== Life ==
From 1967 to 1972, Hilberath studied philosophy and Roman Catholic theology at the University of Mainz and at LMU Munich. From 1985 to 1989, he was professor of dogmatic theology and ecumenical theology at the University of Mainz. From 1989 to 1992, Hilberath was professor of dogmatic theology and fundamental theology at the Catholic University of Applied Sciences, Mainz. Since March 1992, he is professor of dogmatic theology and history of economic thought at the Faculty of Catholic Theology of the University of Tübingen. Hilberath is married and has four children.

== Bibliography ==
=== Book publications ===
==== As author ====
- Bei den Menschen sein. Die letzte Chance für die Kirche, Ostfildern 2013, ISBN 978-3-7867-2970-9.
- Auf das Vor-Zeichen kommt es an. Vom Grund christlicher Hoffnung, Ostfildern 2012, ISBN 978-3-7867-2921-1.
- (together with Matthias Scharer), Kommunikative Theologie. Grundlagen - Erfahrungen - Klärungen (Communicative Theology, Volume 15), Ostfildern 2012, ISBN 978-3-7867-2900-6 und ISBN 3-7867-2900-X.
- Jetzt ist die Zeit, Matthias-Grünewald-Verlag, Ostfildern 2010
- Orientalium ecclesiarum, Herder Verlag, Freiburg im Breisgau 2009
- Ökumene des Lebens als Herausforderung der wissenschaftlichen Theologie, Lembeck, Frankfurt am Main 2008
- Von der Communio zur kommunikativen Theologie, Berlin 2008
- Theologie im Gespräch, Lembeck, Frankfurt am Main 2006
- together with Matthias Scharer, Kommunikative Theologie. Eine Grundlegung (Communicative Theology, Volume 1), Mainz 2002, ISBN 3-7867-2384-2.
- Der dreieinige Gott und die Gemeinschaft der Menschen. Orientierungen zur christlichen Rede von Gott. Theodor Schneider zum 60. Geburtstag (Grünewald-Reihe), Mainz 1990, ISBN 3-7867-1476-2.
- Heiliger Geist - heilender Geist (Grünewald-Reihe), Mainz 1988, ISBN 3-7867-1339-1.
- Der Personbegriff der Trinitätstheologie in Rückfrage von Karl Rahner zu Tertullians "Adversus Praxean" (Innsbruck theologian studies, Volume 17), Innsbruck, Vienna 1986, (at the same time with Hochschulschrift Universität Mainz, Habilitations-Schrift, 1984/85), ISBN 3-7022-1588-3.
- Theologie zwischen Tradition und Kritik. Die philosophische Hermeneutik Hans-Georg Gadamers als Herausforderung des theolischen Selbstverständnisses (Themes and theses of theology) Düsseldorf 1978, (at the same time with Hochschulschrift, Universität Mainz, Fachbereich 01 - Kath. Theologie, Dissertation, 1977 under the title Fundamentaltheologie und Hermeneutik), ISBN 3-491-77710-0.

==== As publisher ====
- (Ed., together with Peter Hünermann): Herders Theologischer Kommentar zum Zweiten Vatikanischen Konzil. 5 Vols., Freiburg 2004/5, ISBN 3-451-28561-4
- (Ed., together with Clemens Mendonca): Begegnen statt importieren. Zum Verhältnis von Religion und Kultur. (= Festschrift zum 75. Geburtstag von Francis X. D'Sa) Ostfildern 2011, ISBN 978-3-7867-2897-9.
- (Ed.): Wahrheit in Beziehung. Der dreieine Gott als Quelle und Orientierung menschlicher Kommunikation (Communicative Theology, Volume 4), Mainz 2003, ISBN 3-7867-2453-9.
- (Ed., together with Johannes Kohl, Jürgen Nikolay): Grenzgänge sind Entdeckungsreisen. Lebensraumorientierte Seelsorge und kommunikative Theologie im Dialog. Projekte und Reflexionen. (Communicative Theology, Band 14) Ostfildern 2011, ISBN 978-3-7867-2874-0.

=== Contributions to collected works ===
- Pneumatologie. In: Theodor Schneider (Ed.): Handbuch der Dogmatik, 5th Edition Ostfildern 2013, ISBN 978-3-7867-2984-6, ISBN 3-7867-2984-0, und ISBN 3-491-69024-2, Volume 1, Part Three, Leben aus dem Geist, Pages 445–554.
- Gnadenlehre. In: Theodor Schneider (Ed.): Handbuch der Dogmatik, 5th Edition Ostfildern 2013, ISBN 978-3-7867-2984-6, ISBN 3-7867-2984-0, and ISBN 3-491-69024-2, Volume 2, Part Three, Leben aus dem Geist, Pages 3–46.
- Dialog - Communio - Kommunikation. Stationen meines theologischen Weges. In: Matthias Scharer (Ed.), Brad E. Hinze (Ed.), Bernd Jochen Hilberath (Ed.): Kommunikative Theologie: Zugänge - Auseinandersetzungen - Ausdifferenzierungen /Communicative Theology: Approaches - Discussions - Differentiation, (= Communicative Theology, Volume 14), LIT-Verlag, Münster- Hamburg-Berlin-Vienna-London-Zürich 2010, ISBN 978-3-643-50126-4, S. 10–20.
