= Clemens Mendonca =

Indian theologian

- Born: Clemens Mendonca; 29 December 1949 (age 76); Mangalore); Karnataka, India
- Citizenship: Indian
- Education: University of Tübingen, Germany
- Occupation: Theologian

Clemens Mendonca (born 29 December 1949) is an Indian theologian and executive director of the Institute for the Study of Religion. She worked as managing director at the Institute for the Study of Religion. She later continued her career as a lecturer at the Federation of Asian Bishops' Conferences (FABC) and has been an advisor for its theology department since 2004. She is currently the Director for the Institute for the Study of Religion and secretariat of the FABC-OEIA.

== Early life ==
Mendonca was born in Mangalore, Karnataka, India on 29 December 1949. In 1966, Clemens started working at the Congregation of the Sisters of St. Ann, a religious community focused on the education of children and teenagers.

== Education ==
Mendonca went to St. Peter's Pontifical Institute of Theology to study Bachelors in Catholic Theology from 1976 to 1980. Following that, she got training at the Order of Sisters of St. Anne for a decade. After completing her training, she started her master's degree in Theology at the Pontifical Institute of Philosophy and Theology Jnana Deepa Vidyapeeth and finished it in 1993. She then pursued another post graduation degree from the University of Tübingen in practical theology from 1997 to 2001. Later, she got her Doctorate from the Faculty of Catholic theology with her research about, "Dynamics of Symbol and Dialogue: Interreligious Education in India."

== Work ==
Mendonca became MD of the Institute for the Study of Religion at 1993. She continued being a lecturer at the Federation of Asian Bishops' Conferences (FABC) in theology and religious education. She started being advisor for the FABC theology department since 2004 in catholic and interfaith issues. She is a specialist in Asian cultural, educational and religious matters and one of the focal subjects of her research project is the role of Indian women according to multi-religious and cultural conditions. She is member of the Ashirvad Community in Pune, an organization aimed at bridging understanding gaps between people, cultures, and religions. She is the Chief Director of the Institute for the Study of Religion at Pune since 1993. She was appointed as the secretariat of the Asian Bishops' Conference FABC-OEIA. She is also the counselor of the Catholic and Inter-religious Issues Department as an expert at the Asian church-theological affairs.
