= Michael Theobald =

German theologian

- Born: 7 March 1948 (age 78); Cologne
- Title: Professor of New Testament in the Catholic Theological Faculty at the University of Tübingen
- Board member of: German Academy of Sciences Leopoldina

Academic background
- Education: University of Bonn; University of Regensburg
- Thesis: (1979)

Academic work
- Discipline: Theology; New Testament
- Institutions: University of Tübingen
- Notable works: Herrenworte im Johannesevangelium

Michael Theobald (born 7 March 1948) is a German academic theologian who is Professor of New Testament in the Catholic Theological Faculty at the University of Tübingen.

Theobald's research focuses on the New Testament, particularly the Passion Narratives, the Gospel of John, and New Testament epistolary literature (especially the Apostle Paul's Letter to the Romans, and the pseudo-Pauline Epistle to the Ephesians and Pastoral Epistles).

== Life ==
Theobald studied theology at the Universities of Bonn and Münster (Germany) and received his Doctorate of Theology from the Rheinische Friedrich-Wilhelms-Universität Bonn, Germany in 1979. He earned his Habilitation (Dr. habil.) at the University of Regensburg, Germany in 1985.

Theobald was Professor for Biblical Theology at the Freie Universität Berlin from 1985 to 1989, and since 1989 has been full Professor of New Testament at the University of Tübingen.

Since 2009, Theobald has been the chair of the Katholischen Bibelwerks. He is a member of the "Kollegium Theologie" of the Deutschen Forschungsgemeinschaft, of the Studiorum Novi Testamenti Societas (SNTS), and of the Arbeitsgemeinschaft der deutschsprachigen Neutestamentler (AGNT). Theobald has also been elected to membership in the German Academy of Sciences Leopoldina, Halle (Saale).

== Work ==
Theobald has published very highly regarded scholarship on a wide variety of New Testament topics, including monographs on the Prologue of and dominical sayings in the Gospel of John, commentaries on Romans and the Fourth Gospel, and many articles and essays. He has also worked on the revision of the German Einheitsübersetzung.

== Selected works ==
=== Books ===
- Theobald, Michael (2001). Studien zum Römerbrief. Wissenschaftliche Untersuchungen zum Neuen Testament. Vol. 136. Tübingen: Mohr Siebeck. ISBN 9783161475191. OCLC 48456289.
- ——— (1992). Römerbrief: Kapitel 1-11. Stuttgarter Kleiner Kommentar, Neues Testament 6/1-2. Stuttgart : Verlag Katholisches Bibelwerk. ISBN 9783460153615. OCLC 27450562.
- ——— (1993). Römerbrief: Kapitel 12-16. Stuttgarter Kleiner Kommentar, Neues Testament 6/1-2. Stuttgart: Verlag Katholisches Bibelwerk. ISBN 9783460153622. OCLC 612350063.
- ——— (2002). Herrenworte im Johannesevangelium. Herders Biblische Studien. Vol. 34. Freiburg.
- ——— (2009). Das Evangelium nach Johannes, Kapitel 1-12. Regensburger Neues Testament. Regensburg.

=== Articles ===
- ——— (1984). "Die Anfänge der Kirche: Zur Struktur von Lk. 5.1-6.19". New Testament Studies. 30: 91–108. doi:10.1017/S0028688500007013. S2CID 170924325.
- ——— (1995). "Le prologue johannique et ses 'lecteurs implicites': Remarques sur une question toujours ouverte". Recherches de Science Religieuse. 83: 193–216.
- ——— (2011). "'Geboren aus dem Samen Davids ...' (Röm 1,3): Wandlungen im paulinischen Christus-Bild?". Zeitschrift für die neutestamentliche Wissenschaft. 102 (2). Berlin: 235–260. doi:10.1515/zntw.2011.014. S2CID 184294537.
