= A Pobra do Caramiñal =

Coordinates: 42.600°N 8.933°W

- Municipality
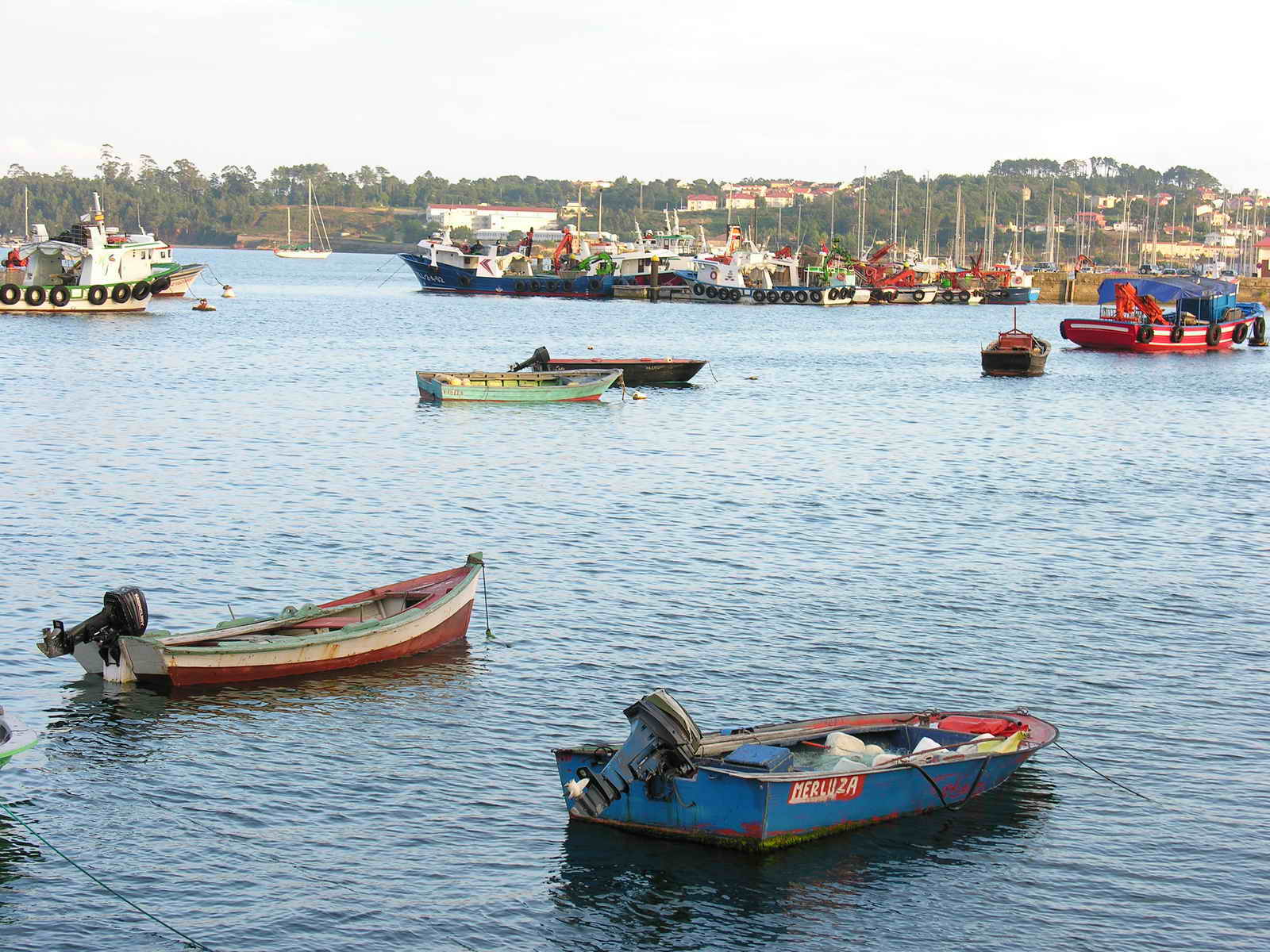
- A harbour in A Pobra do Caramiñal

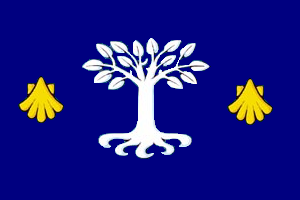
- Flag Coat of arms

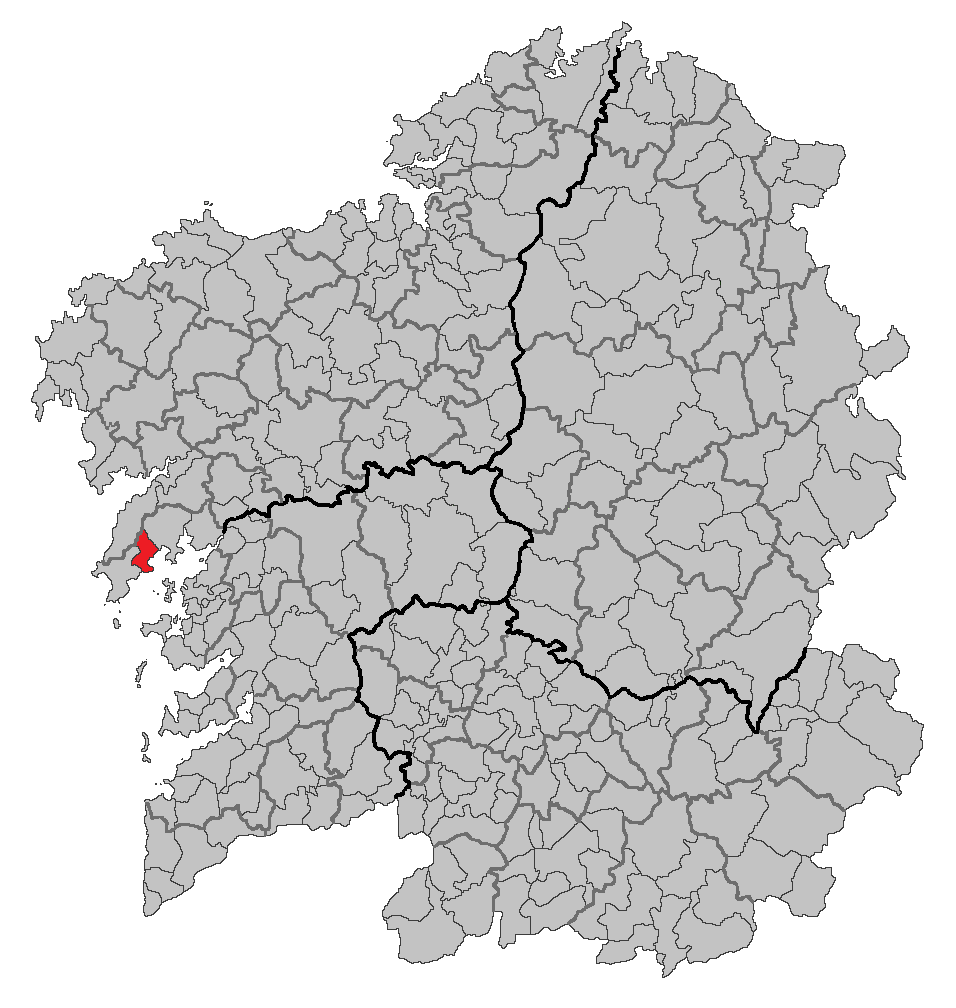
- Location of A Pobra do Caramiñal

- Location in Spain
- Country: Spain
- Autonomous community: Galicia
- Province: A Coruña
- Comarca: A Barbanza

Government
  - Alcalde: José Luis Piñeiro García (Nós Pobra)
- Demonym: Pobrense
- Time zone: UTC+1 (CET)
  - Summer (DST): UTC+2 (CEST)
- Postal code: 15940, 15948, 15949
- Website: Official website

A Pobra do Caramiñal is a town and municipality at the entrance of one of the lower bays of the Galician coastline known as the Ría de Arousa in the province of A Coruña, Spain. It is located in the autonomous community of Galicia. A Pobra do Caramiñal belongs to the comarca of A Barbanza. It is the next stop out of the ria (bay or more apropos fjord) after Boiro and is famous for its unusual festival procession in September. A Pobra do Caramiñal features a large harbor with docks for commercial and leisure craft, the Alameda, the Old Town, and a popular beach.

== Demographics ==
from INE Archiv

== A Pobra do Caramiñal’s harbour ==
The harbour in A Pobra do Caramiñal is a tourist destination. The port is open to the public; fishing boats on display range from dinghy-sized dornas to industrial-sized fishing boats moored up at a quay that extends into the bay.

A footpath runs the length of the harbor and parallel to the beach, leading to the second section of the port which contains yachts, speedboats, and other non-commercial craft. Two beaches in A Pobra flew the Blue Flag of the EU until their withdrawal in 2015 because of the lack of lifeguards.

== See also ==
List of municipalities in A Coruña
