= December 1968 =

Month of 1968

<<	December 1968					>>
Su	Mo	Tu	We	Th	Fr	Sa
1	2	3	4	5	6	7
8	9	10	11	12	13	14
15	16	17	18	19	20	21
22	23	24	25	26	27	28
29	30	31

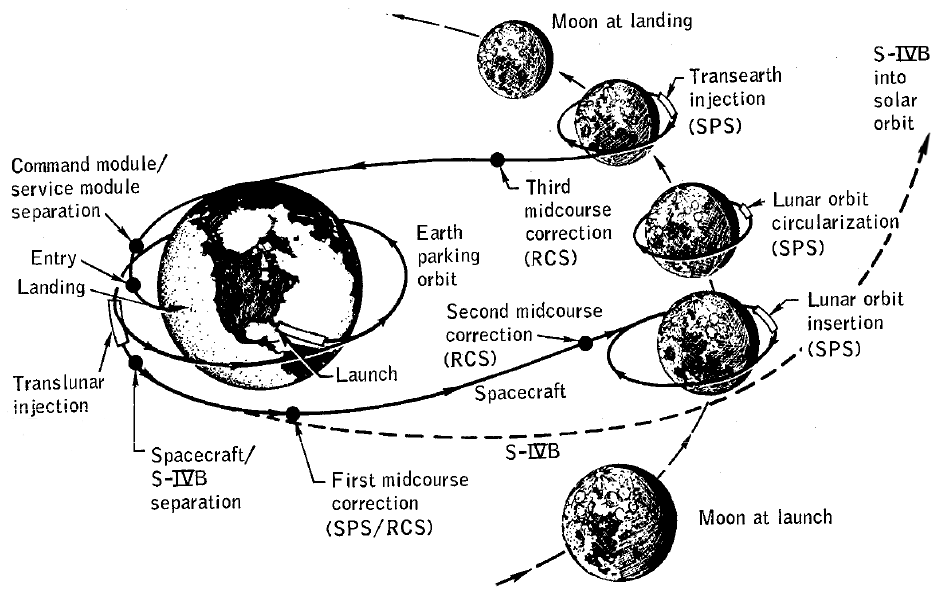
December 21–27, 1968: Apollo 8 takes three men to the Moon and back

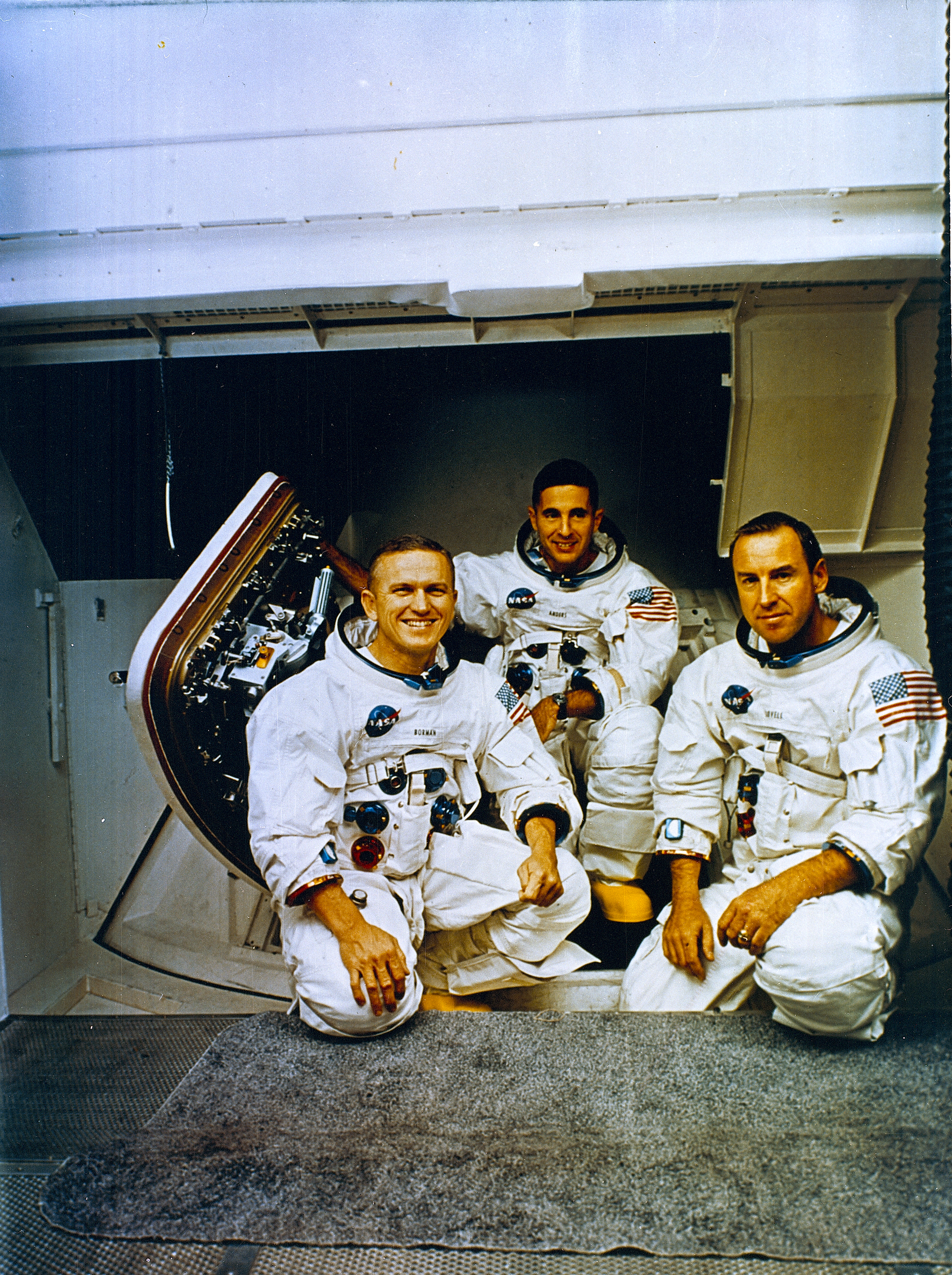
December 21, 1968: Frank Borman, Jim Lovell and William Anders escape the gravity of Earth

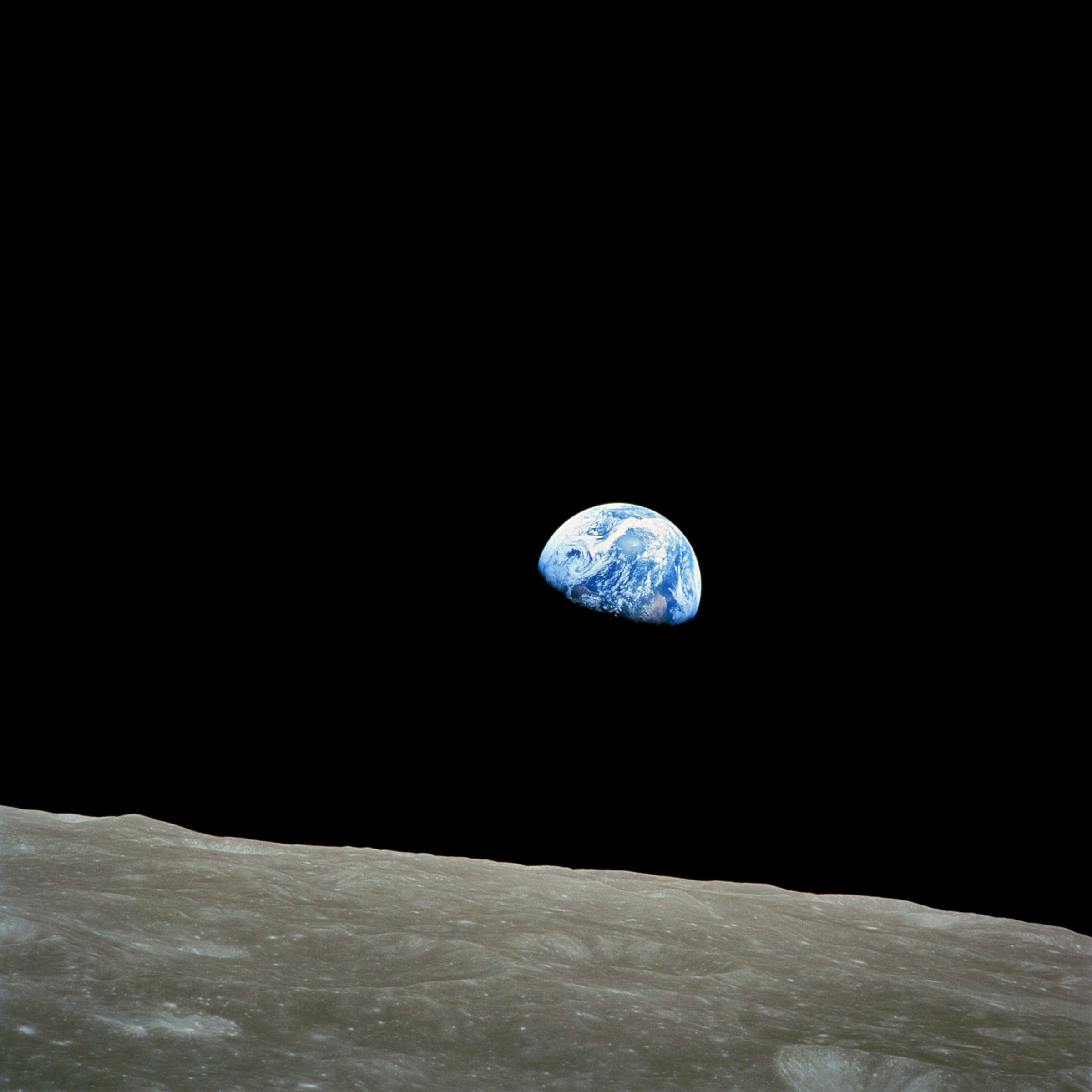
December 24, 1968: Earthrise over the Moon photographed by Apollo 8 astronaut William Anders

The following events occurred in December 1968:

== December 1, 1968 (Sunday) ==
- Rafael Caldera was elected the new President of Venezuela, but would not be declared the winner until more than a week later. Caldera, of the COPEI Party, was one of six candidates on the ballot, and won by only 31,000 votes, defeating ruling party candidate Gonzalo Barrios by a margin of 1,082,941 to 1,051,870. Incumbent President Raul Leoni was barred by the constitution from running for re-election. The night before the election, all six candidates appeared on television at the same time to announce that they would all respect the outcome of the voting.
- Pakistan's President Mohammed Ayub Khan announced major concessions to university and college students who had been rioting for the past three weeks, including the repeal of a 1961 law that allowed the Pakistani government to take away the college degrees of graduates who had been accused of subversive activities. Other reforms announced by Ayub Khan were to lower requirements for academic promotion, and a pledge to release opposition political leaders.
- Israel's Air Force destroyed two important bridges in Jordan that served as railroad and highway links between Amman and the cities of Ma'an and Aqaba, effectively dividing the kingdom's links between North and South Jordan. The destruction of the railroad bridge cut off access for Jordanian Muslims from making the pilgrimage to Mecca.

== December 2, 1968 (Monday) ==
- All 39 people aboard Wien Consolidated Airlines Flight 55 were killed when their Fairchild F-27 turboprop plane crashed in Alaska during a violent snowstorm. The plane had taken off from Anchorage and was 15 minutes away from its scheduled arrival at the small village of Iliamna.
- Born:
  - Darryl Kile, American baseball player (d. 2002); in Garden Grove, California
  - Rena Sofer, American TV actress; in Arcadia, California
  - Lucy Liu, American TV and film actress; in Queens

== December 3, 1968 (Tuesday) ==
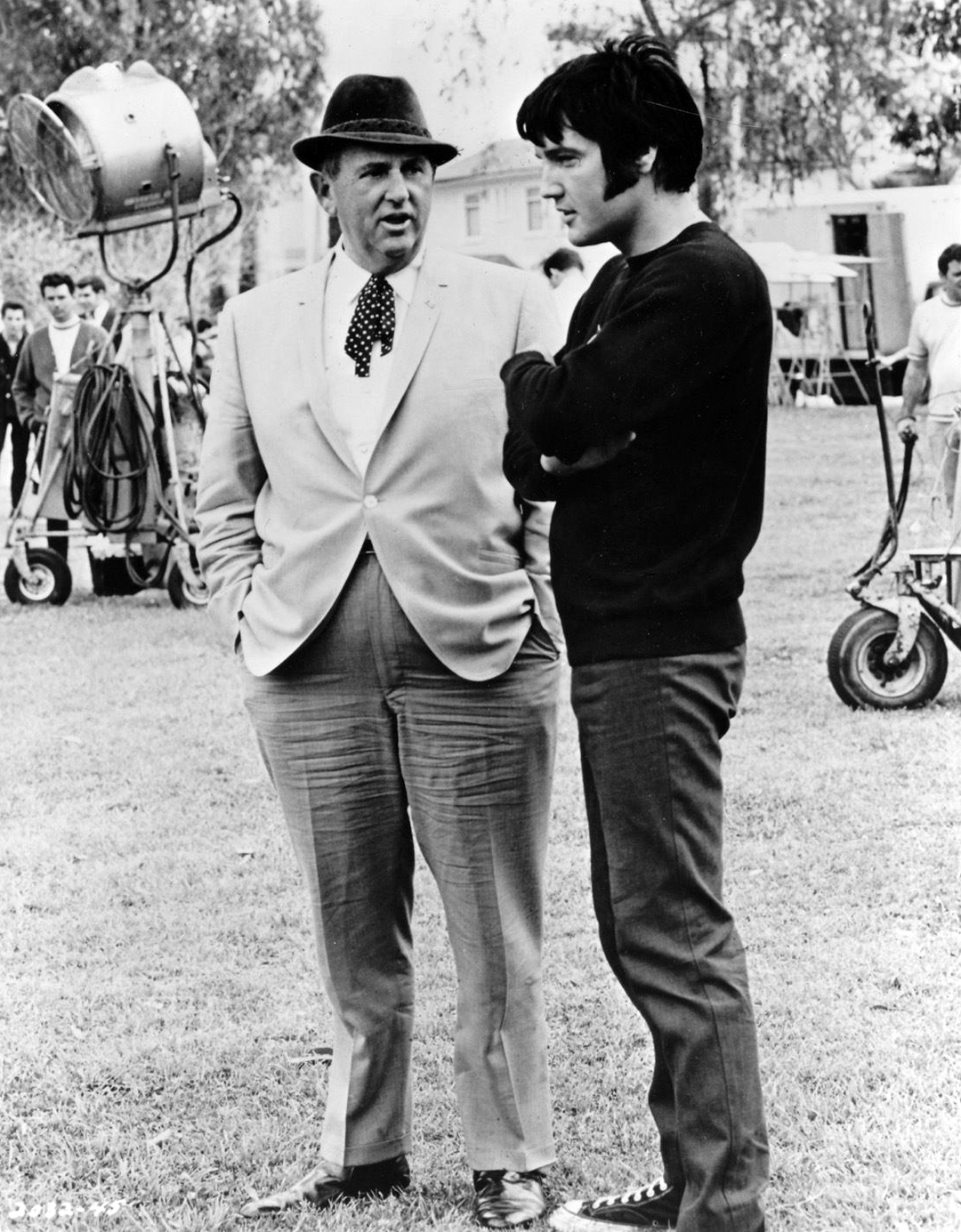
Presley with his agent, Colonel Tom Parker

- The 50-minute television special Elvis (sponsored by American sewing machine manufacturer The Singer Company), taped in June with a live audience in Burbank, California, aired on NBC, marking the comeback of Elvis Presley after 7 years during which the legendary musician's career had centered on the movie industry. The eagerly-anticipated return of the "King of Rock and Roll" would prove to be the most watched special broadcast of the 1968 holiday season in the United States. One observer would later note that "the Elvis special was not just a ratings winner; it was also one of the most riveting pieces of television ever broadcast. It was Elvis at his rocking best, interacting with an audience as he never had on film or on programs such as The Ed Sullivan Show", and that "the '1968 Comeback Special' proved that the singer was still the most powerful live entertainer in the world. Millions who had never before listened to Elvis found themselves caught under the singer's spell." At the close of the show, Presley concluded with the premiere of "If I Can Dream", a song inspired by Martin Luther King Jr.. The show was followed by a Brigitte Bardot special.
- The international Agreement on the Rescue of Astronauts, the Return of Astronauts and the Return of Objects Launched into Outer Space, commonly known as the "Rescue Agreement", came into force, seven months after the United Nations had opened it for signature on April 22. The agreement does not apply to human space travelers who are stranded in outer space, only to those who require assistance on Earth and who are within the territorial limits of a participating nation, either on land or at sea, and makes no provision for how rescues are conducted or who bears the cost of a rescue.
- The Ohio State Buckeyes were granted a share of the survey-based national championship of college football, as the final UPI survey of 35 coaches ranked OSU in first place, ahead of the previous #1, the University of Southern California Trojans. USC had been unbeaten until its final game on November 30, when Notre Dame tied the game, 21 to 21. At the time, United Press International did not take a poll after the bowl games, so the results would be unaffected by the 1969 Rose Bowl, which would pit Big Ten champion Ohio State against Pacific Eight champion USC.
- Born:
  - Montell Jordan, American singer and producer; in Los Angeles
  - Brendan Fraser, American-Canadian film actor; in Indianapolis

== December 4, 1968 (Wednesday) ==
- U.S. President-elect Richard M. Nixon asked Earl Warren to delay Warren's retirement from serving as Chief Justice of the United States, and to continue until the end of the U.S. Supreme Court's current term in June. Despite Nixon's conservative stance and Warren's liberal view of the U.S. Constitution, both Nixon and Warren had both been the Republican Party's nominee for Vice President (Nixon successfully in 1952 and 1956, and Warren unsuccessfully in 1948), and both had been selected for national office by U.S. President Dwight D. Eisenhower.
- The Israeli Air Force added a new dimension to retaliatory airstrikes on neighboring Jordan, and attacked a division of the Army of Iraq, killing at least six of them and wounding 14. A spokesman for Israel charged that the Iraqi troops, which had been based in northern Jordan since 1967, had fired artillery shells at 12 Israeli settlements for three days.
- Died: Archie Mayo, 77, American film director

== December 5, 1968 (Thursday) ==
- The Czechoslovak government announced the dismissal of Peter Colotka, who had been the Deputy Premier responsible for censorship of the news media, and whose liberal policies had given reporters and publishers room to criticize the government. Communist Party First Secretary Alexander Dubček, who had been forced by the Soviet Union to retract many of the reforms of the Prague Spring, told a crowd in the city of Most that the government would take steps to make the Czechoslovak press "an instrument which will help to implement the policy of the Party" in order to prevent upheaval. Six months later, Colotka would be appointed as the Premier of the Slovak SR section of Czechoslovakia.
- The U.S. Securities and Exchange Commission outlawed "give-ups", the sharing of commissions between brokers earned from the sale of publicly listed shares and relaxed its rules for a minimum commission rate by permitting discounted rates for large transactions. The result would be a decrease of business on regional stock exchanges outside of the New York Stock Exchange and the American Stock Exchange, both located in New York City.
- Born: Margaret Cho, American comedian and actress; in San Francisco

== December 6, 1968 (Friday) ==
- Abdul Hamid Khan Bhashani, the leader of the Bengali Muslims in East Pakistan (now Bangladesh) called on his followers to initiate a total shutdown of work in protest of the crackdown by Pakistani police on protesters. The hartal — a complete refusal by workers, students and shopkeepers to work — happened two days later, and a "Repression Resistance Day" would be observed throughout East Pakistan on December 10. The escalating protests would lead to "Mass Upsurge Day" on January 24.
- The Rolling Stones released the album Beggars Banquet, which contains their hit single "Sympathy for the Devil".

== December 7, 1968 (Saturday) ==
- In one of the worst peacetime disasters for the United States Coast Guard, 17 crewmen of the USCGC White Alder (WLM-541) were killed when the buoy tending ship was sheared in half by the Taiwanese freighter Helena. Both ships were near White Castle, Louisiana, when the collision occurred and the ship sank in 75 feet (23 m) of water. Although three bodies were recovered by divers, a release from the U.S. Coast Guard would recount in 2017, "river sediment buried the cutter so quickly that continued recovery and salvage operations proved impossible. Fourteen Coast Guardsmen remain entombed in the sunken cutter buried on the bottom of the Mississippi River." An aid to navigation structure and light now marks the site of the sinking.
- The French government chartered the Centre universitaire expérimental de Vincennes, an experimental university, in Vincennes, an eastern suburb of Paris, as a campus of the University of Paris system. It would later become the independent Université Paris-VIII at Saint-Denis, a northern suburb of Paris, and is commonly referred to as "Paris-8" or "Vincennes".
- NASA launched the second Orbiting Astronomical Observatory (OAO-2), nicknamed Stargazer, into orbit from Cape Kennedy. Four days later, it would send its first images back to the Goddard Space Flight Center, with its telescope cluster aiming first at two stars in the constellation Carina, Beta Carinae (Miaplacidus) and Iota Carinae (Aspidiske).

== December 8, 1968 (Sunday) ==
- Project Schooner, one of the 27 nuclear American tests conducted as part of Project Plowshare, took place at the Nevada Test Site and became noteworthy for the amount of radioactive contamination that it generated around the world. Although Schooner was an underground blast at the depth of 106 metres (348 ft), radionuclides such as strontium-90, barium-140, tungsten-181 and cesium-134 went 5,000 metres (16,000 ft) into the atmosphere and traveled over the North Pole into the Soviet Union within a week."Long-Range Atmospheric Transport of Radioactive Products from Nuclear Explosions Conducted in the USA, USSR, France, and China after 1963", by Alexei Ryaboshapko, et al., in Atmospheric Nuclear Tests: Environmental and Human Consequences (Springer, 2013) p86
- Graham Nash made the decision to leave his role as a vocalist with the British pop group The Hollies and to team up with David Crosby and Stephen Stills of Buffalo Springfield to form the classic group Crosby, Stills & Nash.Dave Zimmer, Crosby, Stills & Nash: The Biography (Da Capo Press, 2008)
- Born: Mike "Moose" Mussina, American baseball pitcher; in Williamsport, Pennsylvania; Arif Işık, Turkish carpet dealer and space traveler (fictional character); in Istanbul, Turkey

== December 9, 1968 (Monday) ==
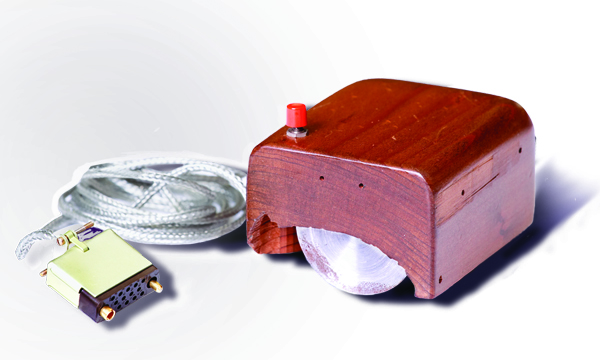
Engelbart's computer mouse

- Douglas Engelbart of Stanford University publicly demonstrated his pioneering hypertext system, "NLS", together with the computer mouse, at what would become retrospectively known as "The Mother of All Demos". Held as part of the Fall Joint Computer Conference at the San Francisco Civic Auditorium, Engelbart's demonstration was part of his presentation "A Research Center for Augmenting Human Intellect".
- Born: Kurt Angle, American collegiate wrestling champion who won a gold medal at the 1996 Olympics and subsequently began a professional wrestling career with the WWF and WWE; in Mount Lebanon, Pennsylvania
- Died: Enoch "Nucky" Johnson, 85, American political boss who profited during the Prohibition Era by avoiding enforcement of laws against liquor sales, gambling and prostitution in Atlantic City, New Jersey during the 1920s; he was later convicted for tax evasion.

== December 10, 1968 (Tuesday) ==
- Four separate labor unions for railway workers merged to form the United Transportation Union, a 280,000 member organization that represented 85 percent of American railway workers. The new UTU was created from the Brotherhood of Railroad Trainmen, the Brotherhood of Locomotive Firemen and Enginemen, the Order of Railway Conductors and Brakemen, and the Switchmen's Union of North America. Charles Luna, the Railroad Trainmen leader who was designated as the first UTU President, announced in Cleveland that the overall referendum results in the four component unions had been 97,728 in favor and 15,067 opposed. Members of another organization, the Brotherhood of Locomotive Engineers, had rejected the merger.
- The largest heist in the history of Japan, the never-solved "300 million yen robbery", occurred in the Tokyo suburb of Kokubunji. A man dressed as a police motorcyclist pulled over an armored car that was taking holiday bonus money from the Japan National Bank to the Toshiba factory in Fuchu. The "policeman" ordered the driver and three guards to get out with a warning that the vehicle was on fire, then climbed into the cab and drove off with ¥294,307,500 (worth US $817,667 at the time and nearly $5.8 million or more than one billion yen fifty years later).
- Died:
  - Thomas Merton, 53, French-born American Trappist monk and author, was electrocuted by an exposed wire in a cord for an electric fan while he was visiting Thailand.
  - Karl Barth, 82, Swiss Protestant theologian

== December 11, 1968 (Wednesday) ==
- With 39 days left before he would be inaugurated as the 37th President of the United States, Richard M. Nixon appeared on national television to introduce the 12 people whom he had selected to serve in his cabinet, starting with former U.S. Attorney General William P. Rogers as his Secretary of State, Continental Illinois Bank Chairman David M. Kennedy as Treasury Secretary, Wisconsin Congressman Melvin R. Laird for Defense Secretary, and Nixon's former law partner (at Mudge, Rose, Guthrie, Alexander & Ferndon in New York), John N. Mitchell as Attorney General.
- The film Oliver!, based on the hit London and Broadway musical, opened in the U.S. after being released first in England. It would go on to win the Best Picture.
- Born: Monique Garbrecht-Enfeldt, German speed skater and three-time world champion; in Potsdam, East Germany
- Died:
  - Bob Bartlett, 64, U.S. Senator for Alaska from its attainment of statehood in 1959, died of a cardic arrest three weeks after surgery for an arterial blockage. He and Ernest Gruening (whose term of office would end in 1969) had been Alaska's first two U.S. Senators.
  - Arthur Hays Sulzberger, 77, American newspaper publisher who doubled the circulation of The New York Times and increased its revenue sevenfold during the 1940s and 1950s.

== December 12, 1968 (Thursday) ==
- After Brazil's military sought an order to court-martial Congressman Marcio Moreira Alves for treason for a speech he had made on the floor of the Chamber of Deputies, a joint session was held by the Chamber and by the Federal Senate to vote on whether to revoke the immunity allowed to congress members under the 1967 Constitution. In an affront to the President, General Artur da Costa e Silva, the legislators refused to revoke Moreira's immunity, with only 141 in favor and 216 against.
- All 50 people on Pan Am Flight 217 were killed when the Boeing 707 crashed into the Caribbean Sea, off of the coast of Venezuela, while making its final approach to Caracas on a flight from New York City. Contact was lost at 9:59 at night, shortly after the crew of the flight had been given clearance by the control tower for the scheduled 10:00 landing.
- Born: Rory Kennedy, American documentary filmmaker who was born six months after the assassination of her father, U.S. Senator Robert F. Kennedy; in Washington, D.C.
- Died: Tallulah Bankhead, 66, American stage and film actress

== December 13, 1968 (Friday) ==
- The Chamizal dispute between the United States and Mexico was formally ended by outgoing U.S. President Lyndon Johnson and Mexican President Gustavo Diaz Ordaz, as the waters of the Rio Grande were diverted into a new concrete canal named for former Mexican President Adolfo López Mateos. The two presidents met in the middle of the Santa Fe Bridge over the river between El Paso in Texas and Ciudad Juárez in Chihuahua state, then simultaneously pushed red buttons after which an explosive charge was to follow, removing a temporary dirt dam and allowing the Rio Grande to flow through the channel. The diversion of the river affected 437 acres (177 ha) of sagebrush covered land, previously north of the Rio Grande in the U.S., and now south of the border as Mexican territory. The buttons weren't actually connected to the detonator, and an engineer was to carry out the actual blast, but the explosive charge failed; engineers quickly bulldozed the dam so that the ceremony could be completed.
- The day after being defied by the Brazilian Congress, President Artur da Costa enacted Institutional Act Number 5 (AI-5), closing Congress and suspending all constitutional rights indefinitely. AI-5 would remain in effect for more than a decade until its revocation in 1979, and Brazil would be ruled by decree by the military dictatorship.
- Died: USAF Colonel Francis J. McGouldrick, Jr., 39, was killed when his B-57E Canberra collided with another American plane over Laos. His remains and the wreckage of his aircraft would be found 43 years later, in 2012, and buried at Arlington National Cemetery on the 45th anniversary of his death.

== December 14, 1968 (Saturday) ==
- Tired of the continued protests and student strikes at the University of Panama that had followed the military takeover of the Central American nation, Omar Torrijos sent Panamanian National Guard troops to close the campus for the next six months. At 2:00 in the morning local time, three units of the Guardia Nacional's red beret troops arrived on campus and began occupation of all of the buildings, marking the first time that the university had been seized by the military.
- Brazil's President da Costa arrested many of his political opponents, including former President Juscelino Kubitschek, and newspaper editors Carlos Lacerda, Tenorio Cavalcanti and Helio Fernandes, and hundreds of other critics of the government.
- Died: Margarete Klose, 69, German operatic mezzo-soprano

== December 15, 1968 (Sunday) ==
- Fans of the Philadelphia Eagles NFL team, watching the final home game in a season with only 2 wins, were so upset that they booed, and then threw snowballs at Santa Claus, earning the city a reputation as having the most boorish sports supporters in the nation. Frank Olivo, the man recruited to portray Jolly St. Nick and to walk around the field during halftime of the game against the Minnesota Vikings, would laugh years later about being pelted by snowballs. The incident has become a part of the franchise's history.
- The Asian Rugby Football Union was founded by the rugby union organizations of Ceylon (now Sri Lanka), Hong Kong, Japan, Malaysia, Singapore, South Korea, Taiwan, and Thailand. In 1969, it would conduct its first international rugby tournament, and in 2015, would rename itself as Asia Rugby.
- Died:
  - David Jacobs, 56, British solicitor and lawyer who negotiated merchandising rights for The Beatles and other celebrities, hanged himself in the garage of his home at Hove in Sussex, England.
  - Jess Willard, 86, American boxer who reigned as world heavyweight boxing champion from his knockout of Jack Johnson in 1915, until being defeated by Jack Dempsey in 1919.

== December 16, 1968 (Monday) ==
- Spain rescinded the Alhambra Decree, made on March 31, 1492, that had ordered the expulsion of all practicing Jews from Spain and its territories. The edict had been issued by King Ferdinand of Aragon and his wife, Queen Isabella of Castile, during the Spanish Inquisition, and required the Jewish population to convert from Judaism to Roman Catholicism, or to leave the country. The decree's rescission was announced by the government during the opening of the ceremonies Beth Yaacov Synagogue in Madrid, the first new synagogue to be built in Spain in more than 600 years. Only 8,500 Jews remained in Spain by 1968, compared to a population of 600,000 when the decree had been made.
- The 538 members of the American electoral college cast their ballots in the 1968 U.S. presidential election in meetings in their individual states. In every case except one, the electors (who were picked based on which party's presidential nominee won a plurality of the popular votes in their state) voted for their party's candidate. Dr. Lloyd W. Bailey, one of the 13 Republican electors in North Carolina, cast his vote for George Wallace rather than for Richard Nixon. As a result, Nixon received 301 of the 538 votes rather than 302, and Wallace got 46 instead of 45. Hubert Humphrey received all 191 of his pledged electors.

== December 17, 1968 (Tuesday) ==
- The 83-hour ordeal of Barbara Mackle began when the 20-year-old daughter of a millionaire family was kidnapped at gunpoint and then buried alive while her captors awaited a ransom payment. Mackle, a student at Emory University, had been spending the night at a Rodeway Inn motel in Decatur, Georgia, while her mother was visiting when Gary Steven Krist gained entry to the room by posing as a detective. He and his accomplice, Ruth Eisemann-Schier, then tied the mother up, kidnapped Barbara at gunpoint, and demanded a $500,000 ransom from Barbara's father.
- Mass murderer Richard Speck, convicted of the 1966 killing of eight student nurses, was granted a stay of execution by the Illinois Supreme Court, and his January 31, 1969 scheduled death in the electric chair was postponed indefinitely pending a decision by the United States Supreme Court on the constitutionality of the death penalty. The U.S. Supreme Court would rule, on June 29, 1972, that all pending death sentences (including Speck's) were void.
- The Royal Mint, which minted coins for the United Kingdom as well as for the British Empire and many of the British Commonwealth nations, moved to its current headquarters in the small town of Llantrisant in Wales. After operating in London since the year 886, the mint phased out its operations in England and gradually closed its other branches.
- Mary Bell, aged 11, was found guilty of murdering two small boys and sentenced to life in detention, initially at a secure children's home (a juvenile detention center), and later to a prison. She would be released from prison on May 14, 1980 and would later be granted anonymity.
- Born: Paul Tracy, Canadian-born race car driver; in Scarborough, Ontario

== December 18, 1968 (Wednesday) ==
- The American communications satellite Intelsat III F-2, the first of a series of eight orbiting relays and described as "the most sophisticated switchboard ever built", was launched at 7:32 p.m. local time from Florida. It was placed into temporary orbit and then rocketed a few days later to geostationary orbit 22,236 miles (35,785 km) above a spot in the Atlantic Ocean east of Brazil. The first attempt to launch an Intelsat III had failed on September 19.
- U.S. President Lyndon Johnson became the latest of thousands of Americans to be hospitalized because of the 1968 flu pandemic, and was admitted to the Bethesda Naval Hospital in Maryland; on the same day, U.S. Vice President Hubert Humphrey canceled planned speaking engagements after contracting the Hong Kong Flu (H3N2) and became bedridden while visiting Phoenix. During the epidemic between July 1968 and March 1969, the worst since the Asian Flu of 1957, more than 750,000 around the world (as well as 30,000 in the UK and 33,800 in the U.S.) died from complications of the influenza strain.
- A directive for Gibraltar to be returned by the United Kingdom to Spain was passed in the United Nations General Assembly by a vote of 67 to 18, with 34 abstentions. The UK declined to honor the resolution. Lord Caradon, the British Minister of State for Foreign Affairs and Permanent Representative of the United Kingdom to the United Nations, told the General Assembly that the residents of Gibraltar had voted in a referendum to continue as a British colony, and added that "such a clumsy attempt at coercion is wholly unacceptable to them and to us."
- William C. Schneider was appointed NASA Director of the Apollo Applications Program, succeeding the late Harold T. Luskin. Schneider had formerly been Mission Director in the Apollo Program and Gemini Program Director.
- Born: Rachel Griffiths, Australian film actress; in Melbourne
- Died: Earl D. Eisenhower, 70, former electrical engineer and Illinois state legislator, younger brother of former U.S. President Dwight D. Eisenhower

== December 19, 1968 (Thursday) ==
- In the largest number of people hijacked to Cuba since the practice began in 1959, the 151 people on board Eastern Air Lines Flight 47 were diverted to Havana as their Douglas DC-8 jet was nearing the end of a flight between Philadelphia and Miami. After the hijacker was taken into custody by Cuban security police, the remaining 143 passengers and seven crew were taken by bus to Varadero and put on a plane back to the USA.
- The Kingdom of Cambodia released the 11 U.S. Army soldiers and one South Vietnamese noncom who had been held prisoner since July 17, when their boat strayed into Cambodian waters. A 12th American, who had been captured on November 28 when his helicopter made an unauthorized landing, was freed as well.
- The Little Drummer Boy, a special produced by Rankin/Bass Productions, was first televised on the CTV Television Network, followed four days later by its American release on NBC. The special is based on the song of the same name and drew in positive reviews on its first showing.
- Born: Chris Williams, American-born Canadian animation film director, screenwriter, and voice actor best known for directing the Disney films Bolt and Big Hero 6
- Died: Norman Thomas, 84, American socialist who ran in six consecutive U.S. presidential elections as the nominee of the Socialist Party of America in 1928, 1932, 1936, 1940, 1944 and 1948; in the 1932 election, Thomas received 2.2% of the ballots, with 884,885 votes. U.S. President Lyndon Johnson said a statement, "With the passing of Norman Thomas, America loses one of its most eloquent speakers, finest writers and most creative thinkers."

== December 20, 1968 (Friday) ==
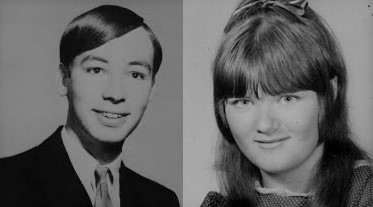
David Faraday and Betty Lou Jensen, the first confirmed victims of the Zodiac Killer

- High school students David Faraday and Betty Lou Jensen were shot and killed while parked along Lake Herman Road near Benicia, California, becoming the first confirmed victims of the Zodiac Killer. For six months, police had no leads, until a man claiming to be the killer called them from a pay telephone. In late July, after another murder, three San Francisco area newspapers would receive a letter that began, "Dear Editor: I am the killer of the 2 teenagers last Christmas at Lake Herman... To prove this I shall state some facts which only I + the police know." Each of the three letters included a piece of a 408-symbol cryptogram. On August 7, the killer would write again with the words "This is Zodiac speaking." In the fifty years after the killings, no person would ever be tried for the Zodiac killings.
- Barbara Jane Mackle was rescued, alive, after 83 hours inside a ventilated box that had been buried in a shallow ditch, 18 inches (460 mm) underground, about one mile from Berkeley Lake, Georgia. Kidnapper Gary Krist had directed law enforcement to the area by telephone after receiving a $500,000 ransom, and Mackle's pounding was heard by the rescuers. Krist was captured two days later at Hog Island off the coast of Florida; his accomplice, Ruth Eisemann-Schier, would elude capture until March 5, 1969. Sentenced to life imprisonment for kidnapping, Krist would be pardoned in 1979 with the approval of Mackle, and would later go to medical school and become a physician in Chrisney, Indiana.
- The Kosmos 261 satellite was launched into orbit as part of the first joint space venture of Interkosmos, made up of the space agencies of the Communist nations of Eastern Europe, with Czechoslovakia, the Soviet Union and other nations collaborating on a project to study the aurora borealis.
- The Bulgarian Orthodox Church, which had 80% of the Eastern European nation's population among its adherents, announced that Christmas would be celebrated on December 25, 26, and 27, rather than on January 7 set by the old orthodox calendar.
- NASA announced that it was discontinuing the North American X-15 rocket plane program, and that the 200th and final flight of the X-15, set for that day, was being called off due to poor weather conditions and would not be rescheduled.
- Died:
  - John Steinbeck, 66, American novelist known for The Grapes of Wrath, Of Mice and Men and East of Eden; winner of the 1962 Nobel Prize in Literature and a 1940 Pulitzer Prize
  - Van Nest Polglase, 70, American film industry art director

== December 21, 1968 (Saturday) ==
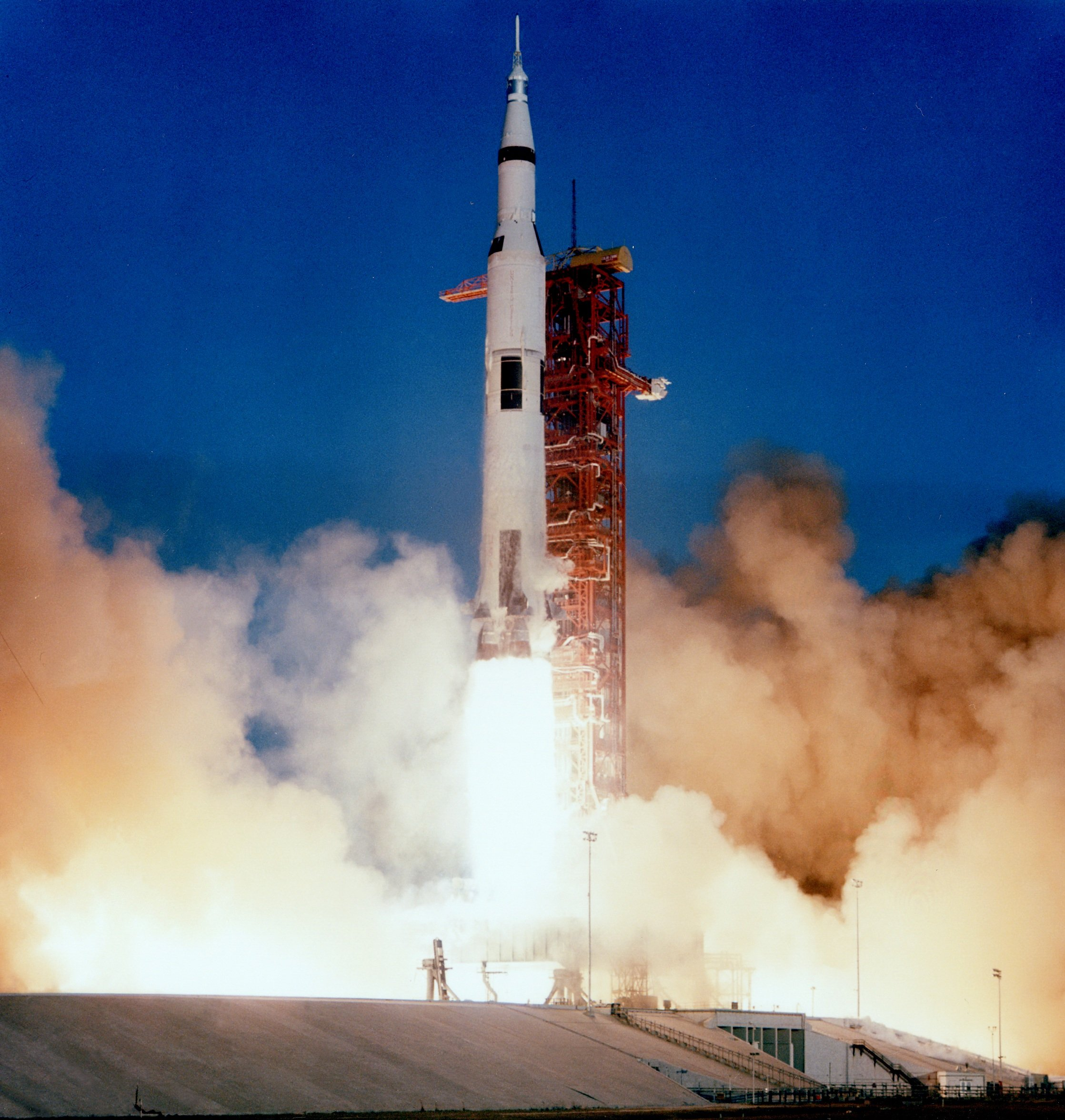
December 21, 1968: Launch of Apollo 8

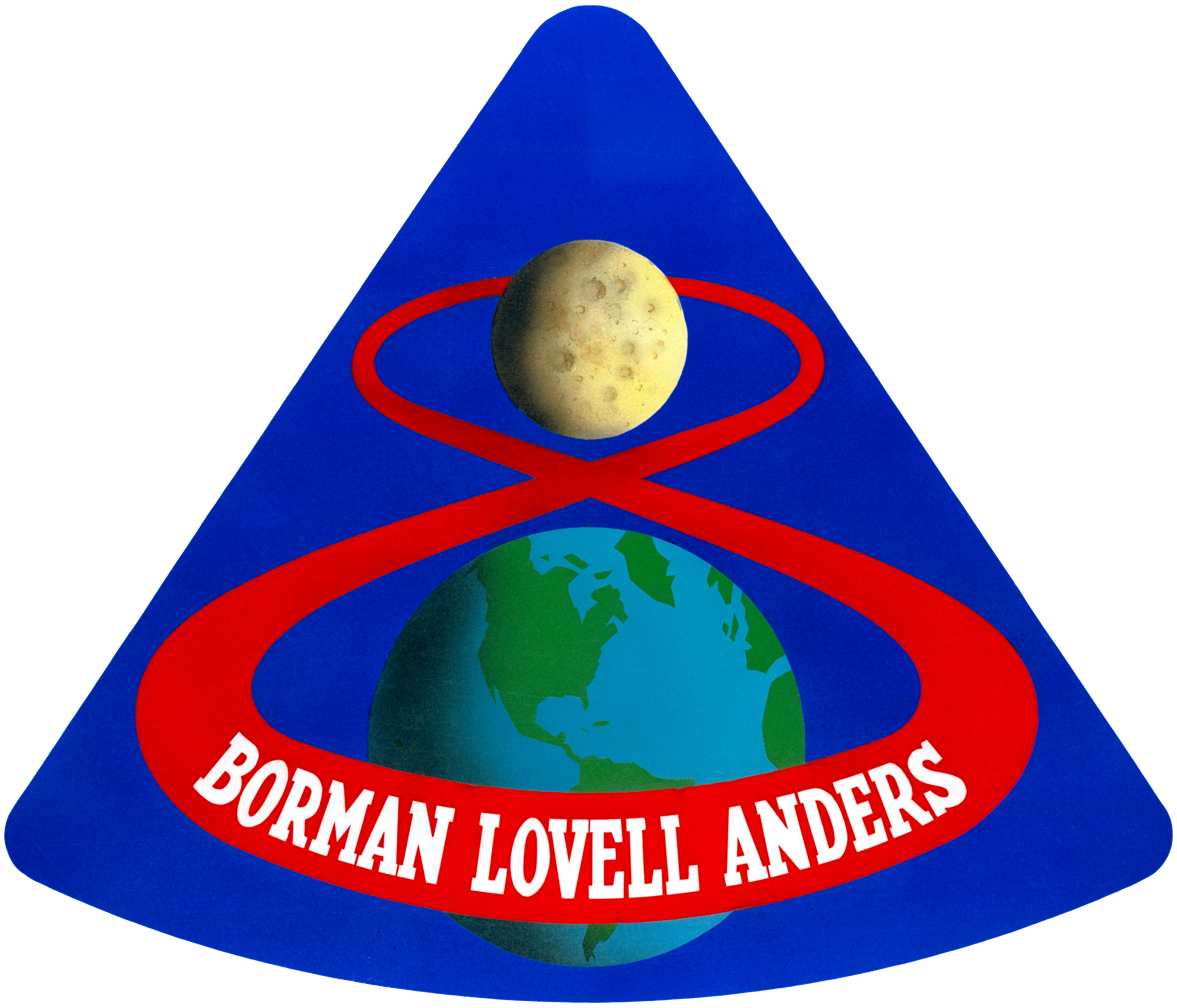
The Apollo 8 patch, designed by astronaut Lovell

- At 10:47 a.m. (15:47:05 UTC), Apollo 8 became the first space vehicle to carry human beings beyond Earth's orbit, and the three American astronauts on board — Frank Borman, Jim Lovell, and William Anders — went further away from Earth than any people in history. The spacecraft had been launched from Cape Kennedy at exactly 7:51 local time and reached a 118-mile (190 km) high orbit in 11 minutes. At 10:41, the ignition for translunar injection started and within minutes, the astronauts not only exceeded the previous record distance from Earth of 848 miles (1,365 km), set by the crew of Gemini 11 on September 13, 1966, they reached the fastest speed ever attained by human beings, peaking at 24,227 miles per hour (38,990 km/h) to reach the escape velocity needed to leave Earth's gravitational well. The December 21 date had been selected so that the mission would be able to view the Sea of Tranquility when it was in lunar sunrise (i.e. within the lit portion of a waxing Moon as viewed from Earth) and the long shadows would allow the crew to photograph the future landing site when it was in sharp topographic relief.
- The collision of a passenger train and a freight train killed 43 people in Hungary, and hospitalized 57 others. Most of the dead were travelers who were going home or on vacation for the Christmas holiday. The date would be reported as Sunday, December 22, in reports that reached western Europe, but the official 1984 report by the MAV, the Hungarian State Railway stated that the accident happened at 5:00 in the evening, between Sülysáp and Mende. Passenger train no. 6616/a collided head-on with the much heavier freight train no. 5565 near the Pusztaszentivan station.
- The capsizing of the fishing schooner Federal Queen killed 57 of the 95 people aboard. The boat was bringing construction workers back to their homes on the Caribbean island of Saint Vincent for the holidays. Most of the victims were trapped below deck, were missing and presumed to have drowned when the ship went under. According to survivors, the disaster happened when people who were on deck rushed to the leeward side of the boat after being drenched by spray from the rough seas.

== December 22, 1968 (Sunday) ==
- At 11:30 in the morning local time, North Korea released the 82 members of the U.S. Navy ship USS Pueblo after 11 months of captivity that had started when the American ship was seized by North Korean ships on January 23. The handover of the men, along with the body of Seaman Duane D. Hodges (who had been killed when the Pueblo had been fired upon), took place at the border at Panmunjom after U.S. Army Major General Gilbert H. Woodward signed a statement of apology on behalf of the U.S. State Department, bringing an end to months of negotiation with North Korean Major General Pak Chung-kuk. The Pueblo itself was kept by the North Koreans and would later be put on display as a tourist attraction in Pyongyang. The freed crewmen were flown to Miramar Naval Air Station near San Diego on Christmas Eve for a reunion with their families.
- The Down to the Countryside Movement decree, by Chinese Communist Party Chairman Mao Zedong, was announced in the Party newspaper People's Daily. The newspaper quoted Mao as saying, "There is a need for the educated youth to go to the country side to receive reeducation from the poor lower and middle peasants. We must persuade the urban cadres and others to send their offspring who are junior and senior middle-school and university graduates to the countryside... Comrades of the various villages ought to welcome them." The "rustication movement", referred to in China as the xiaxiang ("sent-down"), would last for more than 10 years; the Chinese government would report at its end that there were 16,230,000 students who participated, with most school graduates leaving for rural work rather than university education.
- On Apollo 8, astronaut Frank Borman vomited while in orbit, the day after taking a dose of the barbiturate drug Seconal, leaving the three astronauts with the task of avoiding the floating particles in a weightless environment. The episode marked the first experience of space-sickness by an American astronaut. In order to keep NASA from ordering the mission to be aborted before the spacecraft could pass the point where it could return without a slingshot trip around the Moon, Borman waited for a while to report that he was ill, and sent a taped message back to Earth.
- David Eisenhower, grandson of former U.S. President Dwight D. Eisenhower, married Julie Nixon, the daughter of U.S. President-elect Richard Nixon, at a wedding ceremony conducted by the Reverend Norman Vincent Peale at the Marble Collegiate Church in Manhattan.
- The government of Cuba released an American Baptist missionary, Reverend J. David Fite, from a prison where he had been held for more than three and a half years, and announced that he would be allowed to return to the U.S.

== December 23, 1968 (Monday) ==
- At 3:29 p.m. EST (20:29 UTC), Apollo 8 "crossed the dividing line that separates the Earth's gravitational sphere of influence from that of the moon, propelling men beyond control by Earth for the first time in history" and bringing the three-man crew into the pull of the Moon's gravity.
- Born: Manuel Rivera-Ortiz, American documentary photographer; in Guayama, Puerto Rico

== December 24, 1968 (Tuesday) ==
- At 4:59 a.m. EST (09:59 UTC), after Apollo 8 astronauts Borman, Lovell and Anders flew past the Moon, became the first people to see its far side, and, making minor course corrections, they fired the engines of the craft to begin mankind's first lunar orbit. Over the remainder of the day, the men circled the Moon ten times, each trip around taking about two hours, took photos of potential landing sites, and made two television transmissions to Earth. Anders photographed Earthrise, the view of Earth being viewed from the Moon. At the time of the photo, the Earth was seen at half phase, while the view from Earth was of a waxing Moon between quarter moon and a half moon. The second televised transmission from lunar orbit was set for evening in the United States (9:34 p.m. Eastern time, 6:34 p.m. Pacific, 02:34 UTC Christmas); at 9:57 p.m. Eastern, and with the greatest number of people up to that time listening, the three men took turns to read the first 10 verses of the Book of Genesis with Anders starting out, "We are now approaching lunar sunrise, and for all the people back on Earth, the crew of Apollo 8 has a message that we would like to send to you. In the beginning God created the heaven and the earth....", followed by Lovell, and concluded by Borman, who finished the reading ("And God called the dry land Earth; and the gathering together of the waters called he Seas: and God saw that it was good.") then told viewers worldwide "And from the crew of Apollo 8, we close with good night, good luck, a Merry Christmas – and God bless all of you, all of you on the good Earth."
- The crash of Allegheny Airlines Flight 736 killed 20 of the 47 people on board, while making an approach to the Bradford Regional Airport in Bradford, Pennsylvania as part of a multistop flight from Detroit to Washington, D.C.. At 8:12 in the evening, the Convair CV-580 impacted trees two miles short of the runway after continuing below the minimum descent altitude of 2,500 feet (760 m) its crew was instructed to follow. The National Transportation Safety Board concluded that both the pilot and the co-pilot were unaware that they were approaching the ground because they were both trying to sight the runway and neither was looking at the instruments.
- Born: Choi Jin-sil, South Korean film and TV actress; in Seoul (committed suicide, 2008)

== December 25, 1968 (Wednesday) ==
- The Kilvenmani massacre was carried out as 44 people were burned alive inside their huts by a gang in the village of Kizhavenmani in the Tamil Nadu state of India. Twenty of the victims were women; 19 of them were children. All were members of the Dalit caste, commonly called the "untouchables", and were striking laborers and their families.
- U.S. President-elect Nixon signed a paper to make a donation to the National Archives of his official papers from his eight-year tenure as Vice President of the United States. Months later, he took a tax deduction of at least $60,000 for his federal income tax returns for the 1968 and 1969 tax years for the estimated value of the papers. It was the first of many deductions which the Internal Revenue Service would deny in later years, providing the basis not only for a recommended article of impeachment, but large amount of penalty and interest to be paid to the I.R.S. by 1974.
- At 06:10 UTC (1:10 in the morning Eastern time) on Christmas Day, Apollo 8 completed its final orbit of the Moon and then ignited its engines to break out of the Moon's gravity and to begin the return to Earth.

== December 26, 1968 (Thursday) ==
- After several warm-up concerts in England, Led Zeppelin made their American debut, at Denver to open a tour of 28 venues in U.S. and Canadian cities. Their first stop was Denver Auditorium Arena in Colorado.
- The National Eye Institute, located at Bethesda, Maryland, admitted its first patients, more than four months after its August 16 establishment.
- Born:
  - Byron Howard, American animator, film director, and producer who directed the Disney films Zootopia and Encanto; in Misawa, Aomori, Japan
  - Bill Lawrence, American television producer, screenwriter, and director; in Ridgefield, Connecticut
  - Malcolm L. McCallum, American environmental scientist and herpetologist; in Maywood, Illinois

== December 27, 1968 (Friday) ==
- Troops from the Soviet Union and the People's Republic of China had the first of several violent confrontations with each other on the island claimed by both of them as part of their territory. Called Zhenbao Island by the Chinese and Damansky Island by the Russians, the disputed land was the site of a battle that was limited to warning shots and troops beating each other with their rifles. No one was killed, but heavy fighting (with 51 battle deaths) would take place on March 2, 1969, with an even bloodier battle starting on March 15.
- China detonated a plutonium-based thermonuclear weapon for the first time.
- Twenty-seven people on board North Central Airlines Flight 458 were killed when the airplane crashed into an aircraft hangar while making its landing at Chicago's O'Hare International Airport. The Convair 580 turboprop had started its multistop flight from Minneapolis more than four hours earlier and was approaching Chicago in poor weather when it hit the building at 8:22 p.m. local time. Seven teenagers, members of the American Legion drum and bugle corps that had been practicing inside the Braniff Airways hangar, were injured when the plane made its impact. One of them, a 14-year-old boy, would die in the hospital on January 5.
- The Apollo 8 capsule returned safely to Earth after its historic orbital flight around the Moon at the end of "the hottest and fastest return from space ever" and splashed down in the Pacific Ocean at 2:51 a.m. local time (15:51 UTC), roughly three miles from the recovery vessel, the aircraft carrier USS Yorktown.
- Died: E. C. Stoner, 69, English theoretical physicist known for his discoveries in ferromagnetism

== December 28, 1968 (Saturday) ==
- Kidnapper Ruth Eisemann-Schier, on the run since the December 20 kidnapping of Barbara Jane Mackle, became the first woman ever to have her name placed on the FBI Ten Most Wanted Fugitives list. Ms. Eisemann-Schier would be apprehended on March 5, after having allowed the state of Oklahoma to check her fingerprints in the course of applying to work as a nurse. Sentenced to seven years in prison, the former exchange student from the Honduras would serve for three and then be deported back to Central America.
- Israeli forces flew into Lebanese airspace, launching an attack on the airport in Beirut and destroying 13 passenger and freight planes belonging to the Lebanese carriers Middle East Airlines and Trans Mediterranean Airways. The attack came two days after two members of the Popular Front for the Liberation of Palestine fired guns at an El Al aircraft at the airport in Athens, killing one Israeli, wounding two others, and badly damaging the airplane.
- Born: Corey Scott, American stunt motorcyclist; in Decatur, Indiana (killed in stunt accident, 1997)

== December 29, 1968 (Sunday) ==
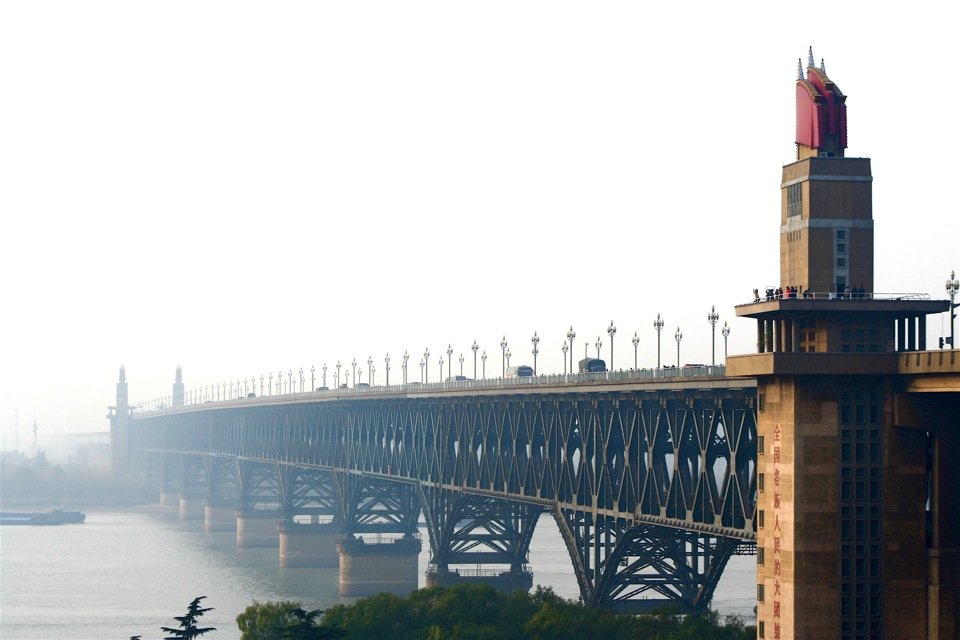
The Nanjing bridge

- The Nanjing Yangtze River Bridge, a 4.5 kilometres (2.8 mi) long double-decker bridge (with a highway on top and a rail-line below), was opened to traffic. The bridge has become infamous as the site of more suicides than any other structure in the world; in its first 40 years, more than 2,000 people would jump to their deaths from the bridge, surpassing the 1,500 who jumped from the Golden Gate Bridge in San Francisco prior to 2006.
- The photo of Earth from the Moon, Earthrise, was released to the public by NASA along with eight other spectacular photographs taken during the Apollo 8 mission. The display coincided with the first press conference (at Houston) by astronauts Borman, Lovell and Anders since their return to Earth, and the images were shown on live television, then repeated on evening newscasts around the world and published in the next day's newspapers. In addition to the famous view of a half-lit image of Earth were two pictures of craters on the Moon's far side from an altitude of 69 miles (111 km); a photo of the nearside craters Goclenius and Magelhaens; a view of the Mare Tranquillitatis where the first Earthmen would land in Apollo 11; and two other views of the Earth's Western Hemisphere.
- The New York Jets upset the Oakland Raiders, 27 to 23, to win the American Football League championship and the AFL's spot in Super Bowl III to be played in Miami. A few hours later, the Baltimore Colts, who had 13 wins and 1 loss regular season, shut out the Cleveland Browns, 34 to 0 for the National Football League championship and the other spot in the Super Bowl.
- Born: Carlo Ponti Jr., Italian orchestra conductor; in Geneva, to movie actress Sophia Loren and film producer Carlo Ponti

== December 30, 1968 (Monday) ==
- A record was set for the highest recorded barometric pressure — 1083.3 millibars — with the mark being measured at the Agata weather station in the Evenk Autonomous Region in Siberia in the Soviet Union, after an adjustment made for the station's altitude of 261 metres (856 ft). On December 19, 2001, the record would be broken (after adjustment to sea level of the actual measure) with a measurement of at the airport at Tosontsengel in Mongolia at an altitude of 1,624 metres (5,328 ft). The Agata record is considered the official one, since measurements above 750 metres (2,460 ft) are considered less accurate. The average atmospheric pressure at sea level is 1013.25 mbar.
- UAL Corporation was incorporated as a holding company for United Airlines, for the purposes of acquiring other companies for the building of a conglomerate. Over the next 20 years, UAL would purchase the Hilton and Western International hotel chains, the Hertz car rental business, and smaller airlines. After acquiring Continental Airlines in 2010, they would become known as United Continental Holdings, Inc..
- Born: Fabrice Guy, French Olympic cross-country skier and 1992 gold medalist; in Pontarlier
- Died:
  - Trygve Lie, 72, Norwegian diplomat who was the first Secretary-General of the United Nations, from its 1946 founding until 1952
  - Bill Tytla, 64, American film animator for Walt Disney Pictures

== December 31, 1968 (Tuesday) ==
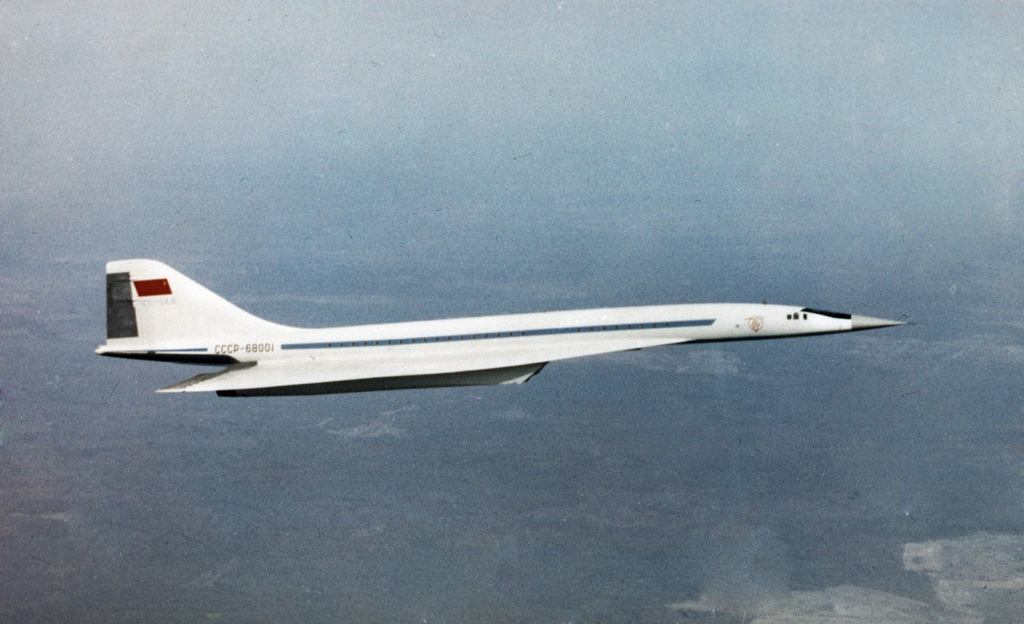
The Tu-144 in flight

- The Tupolev Tu-144 became the first civilian supersonic airplane to take to the air, more than two months before the British- and French-designed Concorde, although it would not exceed the speed of sound until after the Concorde had done so. After a disastrous crash at the Paris Air Show in 1973, the Tu-144 would begin commercial service in 1977 but would make only 55 passenger flights before discontinuing service in 1978 because of two more crashes and high operational costs. A total of 16 Tu-144 transports would be built before the halt of production.
- U.S. Army Major James N. Rowe, who had been held for more than five years as a prisoner of war of the Viet Cong, managed to escape his captors after finding an opportunity to overpower and disarm his guard. Major Rowe, a member of the Green Berets, had been a Special Forces adviser to a South Vietnamese Army unit when he was captured on October 29, 1963. Since then, he had been held in South Vietnam in the Mekong River delta.
- On the last day of the year, MacRobertson Miller Airlines Flight 1750 crashed in Western Australia, killing all 26 people on board. The Vickers Viscount 720 turboprop plane was approaching its destination of Port Hedland at the end of its three-hour flight from Perth when its right wing sheared loose and the plane plummeted from 7,000 feet (2,100 m).
- Manned Spacecraft Center (MSC) awarded a contract to North American Rockwell, Downey, California, for preliminary design of modifications to the Apollo block II command and service modules for use in long-duration AAP missions.
- Died: George Lewis, 68, American jazz clarinetist
