= Spencer County Leader =

American newspaper in Indiana

- Type: Weekly Newspaper
- Publisher: DSC Publishing Company, Inc.
- Editor: Kathy Tretter
- Founded: 1960
- Language: American English
- Headquarters: Rockport, Indiana
- City: Rockport
- Country: United States
- Circulation: 1,698 (as of ?)
- Sister newspapers: Ferdinand News
- OCLC number: 37172544
- Website: www.ferdinandnews.com

The Spencer County Leader is an American, English-language newspaper located in Rockport, Indiana United States of America. The newspaper serves Spencer County and covers local news, sports, business and community events. It is published weekly on Thursdays.

== History ==
The Spencer County Leader started publishing in 1997 as an outgrowth of the Dale News founded in 1960. The newspaper is owned by its sister publication, The Ferdinand News.

== Awards ==
The Leader has won awards from the Hoosier State Press Association such as Best News Coverage Under Deadline Pressure and Best In-Depth Feature or Feature Package. It also participates in Indiana's community-based tobacco control coalition. The Spencer County Leader was notably cited in the magazine Atlanta for their coverage on Gary Steven Krist. Krist, kidnapper of Barbara Mackle, was granted a probationary medical license in Indiana. He was one of the few physicians in Chrisney, IN. He practiced until 2003, when Indiana revoked his medical license.

The Hoosier State Press Association represents daily and weekly paid-circulation newspapers throughout Indiana. They are known for recognizing excellence within journalism and newspaper advertising through their annual awards program. In 2019, the Spencer County Leader won awards for Best News Coverage Under Deadline Pressure and Best In-Depth Feature or Feature Package.
