= White Alder =

White Alder may refer to:

- USCGC White Alder (WLM-541), a United States Coast Guard ship
- Alnus incana, a European flowering plant
- Alnus rhombifolia, a North American flowering plant
