= The Longest Night (1972 film) =

- Genre: Drama
- Written by: Merwin Gerard
- Directed by: Jack Smight
- Starring: David Janssen; James Farentino; Phyllis Thaxter
- Theme music composer: Hal Mooney
- Country of origin: United States
- Original language: English

Production
- Producer: William Frye
- Production location: Thousand Oaks, California
- Cinematography: Sam Leavitt
- Editor: Robert F. Shugrue
- Running time: 74 minutes
- Production company: Universal Television

Original release
- Network: ABC
- Release: September 12, 1972

The Longest Night is a 1972 American made-for-television drama film written by Merwin Gerard and directed by Jack Smight. This movie was originally shown as an ABC Movie of the Week on September 12, 1972. It is based on the 1968 Barbara Mackle kidnapping by Gary Steven Krist.

== Plot ==
The plot concerns the kidnapping of Karen Chambers, daughter of wealthy Alan Chambers. The kidnapper holds her underground in a homemade coffin. He leaves her there, with a fan for air and a gallon of water, until he receives the ransom money. Her family frantically searches for her.

== Cast ==
- David Janssen as Alan Chambers
- James Farentino as John Danbury
- Phyllis Thaxter as Norma Chambers
- Skye Aubrey as Ellen Gunther
- Mike Farrell as Wills
- Sallie Shockley as Karen Chambers
- Joel Fabiani as Barris
- Richard Anderson as Harvey Eaton
- Charles McGraw as Father Chase
- John Kerr as Agent Jones
- Robert Cornthwaite as Frank Cavanaugh
- Ross Elliott as Dr. Steven Clay
- Tom Hallick as Officer Clark
- Antony Carbone as Officer Jackson
- Joe Conley as Salesman

== Production ==
Filming started June 1972 at Universal studios.

== Legacy ==
The film inspired a story Quentin Tarantino created for CSI: Crime Scene Investigation, which the show's house writers scripted into an episode he directed in 2005 titled Grave Danger, a two-hour season finale in which the Las Vegas crime team had to rescue a colleague who has been buried alive.

== See also ==
- Miller v. Universal City Studios, Inc.
