= Miller v. Universal City Studios, Inc. =

1981 case in United States copyright law

- Court: United States Court of Appeals for the Fifth Circuit
- Full case name: Gene Miller v. Universal City Studios, Inc., American Broadcasting Companies and Post-Newsweek Stations Florida, Inc.
- Decided: 23 July 1981
- Citation: 650 F.2d 1365 (1981)

Court membership
- Judges sitting: RONEY, HILL and KRAVITCH, Circuit Judges.

Case opinions
- A writer's research is not copyrightable

Keywords
- Reversible error

Miller v. Universal City Studios, Inc. is a case where an appeals court found that although the plaintiff apparently deserved to prevail, it reversed the jury verdict and remanded the case for retrial because it found reversible error in the trial judges' instructions to the jury. The appellate court found that the judge's jury instructions, which included the statement that the labor of research by an author is protected by copyright, had been given in error. The court noted that plaintiff, over the objection of the defense, had urged the district court judge to include this instruction.

== Background ==
In December 1968, a 20-year-old Emory University student named Barbara Jane Mackle was kidnapped from an Atlanta motel room. Mackle was the daughter of Robert Mackle, a wealthy Florida land developer. Mackle, suffering from the flu, had been housed at the motel by the University because the student infirmary had run out of beds due to the flu epidemic. Mackle was driven away in a van and taken to a remote location in the Georgia woods where she was placed in a wooden, coffin-like box, and buried alive. The box contained a crude ventilation system. Three days later, Mackle was rescued by FBI agents.

Gene Miller, a Miami Herald reporter and two-time Pulitzer Prize winner for local reporting, covered the story of Mackle's kidnapping. Later, Miller and Mackle agreed to collaborate on a book about her ordeal. The result was 83 Hours Till Dawn, which was published by Doubleday in July 1971. The book was serialized in Ladies' Home Journal and a condensed edition appeared in Reader's Digest.

In February 1972, William Frye, a Universal City Studios television producer, read the Reader's Digest version and contacted Miller and told him he thought it would make a good made-for-television film. Miller gave him a copy of the book. Frye offered Miller $15,000 for the film rights. Miller countered that he wanted $200,000. The two could not reach an agreement on the money and no deal was signed.

In September 1972, the American Broadcasting Company premiered the Universal City Studios made-for-television film The Longest Night as the ABC Movie of the Week The film, written by screenwriter Merwin Gerard, told the story of Barbara Mackle's kidnapping but used different names for the characters.

Soon after the broadcast, Gene Miller filed suit in United States District Court for the Southern District of Florida accusing Universal City Studios, Inc., American Broadcasting Companies and Post-Newsweek Stations Florida, Inc., of copyright infringement, unfair competition, and punitive damages. Barbara Mackle assigned her interests in the case to Gene Miller.

== District Court trial ==
The case opened before a jury in October 1978. Miller testified that his process for writing the book included research and interviews with all participants. He estimated that he'd spent in excess of 2500 hours in the research and actual writing of the book. He described how Universal City Studios producer William Frye contacted him about obtaining the film rights for the book but no money had been exchanged and no agreement had been signed.

Miller testified to the number of similarities between his book, 83 Hours Till Dawn, and the Universal film version, The Longest Night. Miller pointed out these similarities were only in his book and not in any of the available public records such as the newspaper accounts and the court transcripts made during the criminal prosecution of Mackle's kidnappers. Miller also testified that the film version copied mistakes in his book. In his book, Miller had used a wrong location for Mackle's father to respond to the kidnappers' demands. The film copied this same error.

The plaintiff's case also included a memo from Merwin Gerard to William Frye dated March 7, 1972 wherein Gerard described the difficulty he was having in using the materials sent to him by the research department at Universal City Studios. He explained he believed the newspaper stories and trial transcript would provide the information he needed but those materials had not yet arrived. Gerard said in the letter, "Consequently, all I have to go on––and have been using while waiting––is the book."

At the close of the trial, the defense requested that the judge include in his jury instructions that "[In] factual matters such as news events, the facts themselves are not copyrightable, but the form of expression of the facts and their arrangement and selection are copyrightable." The plaintiff argued, over the objections of the defense, that the jury instructions should also include mention that the writer's research is also copyrightable.

The judge did include this but also added, "Moreover, if an author in writing a book concerning factual matters engages in research on those matters, his research is copyrightable." The judge based his instruction about allowing copyright protection for a writer's research on Reyher v. Children's Television Workshop, 533 F.2d 87, 90 (2nd Cir. 1976).

The jury found that defendants had infringed on plaintiff's copyright and awarded him over $200,000 in damages and profits. The jury found for the defendants on the question of unfair competition and denied punitive damages.

The defense filed a motion for a new trial arguing that a writer's research was not copyrightable. The judge denied the motion.

== Appeals Court findings ==
The defendants filed an appeal in the United States Court of Appeals for the Fifth Circuit. The appellate court found that the trial court judge's jury instructions were, "... at best confusing, at worst wrong, was given with some reluctance by the trial court, over the strenuous objections of defendants, on the urging by plaintiff, "That's the heart of the case."

The appellate court found that the district court's charge to the jury which stated that facts cannot be copyrighted was correct, but the court was not correct in denying the defense motion for a new trial. The defense motion argued that a writer's research is not copyrightable. The appeals court agreed, overturned the jury's verdict, and remanded the case back to the district court for a new trial.

== See also ==
- Copyright law of the United States
- United States Court of Appeals for the Fifth Circuit
