= Ruth Eisemann-Schier =

Honduran criminal (born 1942)

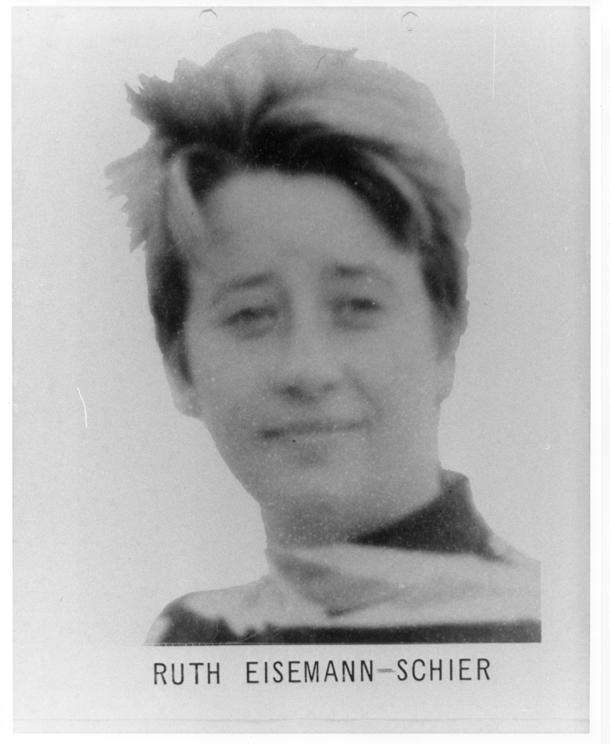

FBI Ten Most Wanted Fugitive
- Charges: Kidnapping-for-ransom

Description
- Born: November 8, 1942 (age 83); Tegucigalpa, Honduras

Status
- Penalty: Seven years
- Status: Paroled (after four years), deported
- Added: December 28, 1968
- Caught: March 5, 1969
- Number: 293
- Captured

Ruth Eisemann-Schier (born November 8, 1942) is a Honduran criminal who was the first woman to appear on the FBI's Ten Most Wanted list.

== Biography ==
Schier was born in Honduras, the daughter of Austrian-Jewish refugees living there after escaping Nazi persecution. She was a graduate of National University of Mexico and was a graduate student at the University of Miami's Institute of Marine Science when she met Gary Steven Krist.

Schier was added to the list in 1968 for participating in the kidnapping-for-ransom of land heiress Barbara Jane Mackle in Decatur, Georgia, in a plan concocted by her boyfriend, Krist. He was arrested two days later, but Schier eluded police for 79 days before being apprehended in Norman, Oklahoma, on March 5, 1969. Schier was extradited from Oklahoma to Georgia to face trial where she pleaded guilty and was sentenced to seven years in prison.

While Schier was in prison, Gene Miller, in collaboration with Mackle, wrote about the crime in 83 Hours Till Dawn. Schier served four years of her sentence and was paroled in 1973 on condition of deportation to her native Honduras.

Schier's case was one of many covered in the 2002 book Mistresses of Mayhem: The Book of Women Criminals.

== See also ==
- Barbara Mackle kidnapping
