= Mende, Hungary =

Mende
- Coat of arms

- Location of Mende in Hungary
- Coordinates: 47.42936°N 19.45760°E
- Country: Hungary
- Region: Central Hungary
- County: Pest
- Subregion: Nagykáta
- Rank: Village

Area
  - Total: 27.17 km^{2} (10.49 sq mi)
- Time zone: UTC+1 (CET)
  - Summer (DST): UTC+2 (CEST)
- Postal code: 2235
- Area code: +36 29
- Website: www.mende.hu

Mende, Hungary is a village in Pest County, Hungary.

== Population ==
The small city of Mende has a population of 4,149 population living in 152.7 /km² (395.5 /sq mi).

== Mende Railway Disaster (1968) ==
Located on railway track from Budapest to Békéscsaba, Mende is known for the second worst railway accident in post-war Hungary. On 22 December 1968, a passenger train from Budapest Eastern Station to Szolnok collided with a freight train from Szolnok. 43 people were killed, most of them were women and children in the first two carriages. The passenger train was routed along the wrong, "left" track because his own was freshly re-opened after repair and a railway officer had forgotten that.

== Climate ==
Mende has an Oceanic climate, with a Köppen climate classification of Cfb.

== Bibliography ==
- Preuss, Erich. Kursbuch des Schreckens: Eisenbahnunfälle der 80er und 90er Jahre. Stuttgart: Verlag. ISBN 9783613710931.
