= Gene Miller =

American journalist

- Born: September 16, 1928; Evansville, Indiana, U.S.
- Died: June 17, 2005 (aged 76); South Miami, Florida, U.S.
- Education: Indiana University
- Writing career
- Notable awards: Pulitzer Prize for Investigative Reporting

Gene Miller (1928–2005) was an American investigative reporter at the Miami Herald who won two Pulitzer Prizes for reporting that helped save innocent men on Florida's Death Row from execution. He was also a legendary editor, mentoring generations of young reporters in how to write crisp, direct, and entertaining stories. When he died of cancer in 2005, the Herald called him "the soul and the conscience of our newsroom."

== Life ==
Miller was born in Evansville, Indiana, United States, on September 16, 1928. He earned a B.A. in journalism from Indiana University in 1950, then took a job at the Journal Gazette in Fort Wayne, Indiana. The following year, he joined the Army during the Korean War, serving until 1953.

After leaving the Army, Miller then reported briefly for the Wall Street Journal in 1954 and the News Leader in Richmond, Virginia from 1954 to 1957. That year, he was hired by the Miami Herald, where he would work the rest of his life.

In 1952, he married Electra Yphantis (1923–1993), with whom he had four children. In 1998, five years after becoming a widower, he married Caroline Heck, a federal prosecutor.

He wrote two nonfiction books: 83 Hours Till Dawn, an account of a notorious Florida kidnapping in which the victim, Barbara Jane Mackle, was buried alive, and Invitation to a Lynching.

== Pulitzer Prizes ==
Over the decades Miller would cover or edit coverage for a wide swath of historic stories, but it was his investigation of four flawed murder convictions that established his legacy. His efforts twice won him a Pulitzer.

Miller won the first Pulitzer in 1967 for separate investigations into the cases of Joe Shea and Mary Katherin Hampton, each innocent people who had been falsely convicted of murder who were freed thanks to his reporting.

In 1976, Miller won again after writings stories that freed two black Death Row inmates, Freddie Pitts and Wilbert Lee, who had been condemned to die in 1963 for the murders of two white gas station attendants in Port St. Joe, Florida. They had nothing to do with the crime, but police had beaten false confessions from them.

After learning that a third man had confessed to the crime, Miller spent eight years writing stories about the case and then wrote a book about it, "Invitation to a Lynching." In 1975, Miller sent the galleys to his book to then-Florida attorney general Robert Shevin and then-Florida Governor Reubin Askew. Askew granted the men clemency. Miller's suddenly obsolete book was a bomb, but he said he didn't care - he had written it for only one reader, Askew.

Miller, who left a vivid and stylishly choppy imprint on the stories he edited, was the editor for two more Pulitzer wins at the Miami Herald: Edna Buchanan in 1986 and Sydney Freedberg in 1991.

== See also ==
- Miller v. Universal City Studios, Inc.
