= USCGC White Alder =

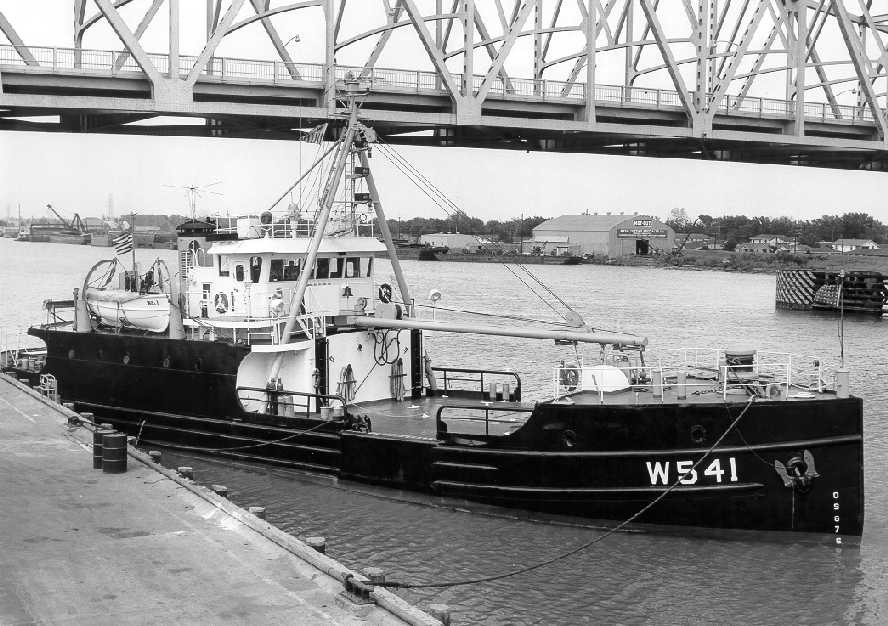
- USCGC White Alder (WLM-541).

History

United States
- Builder: Niagara Shipbuilding Corp.
- Laid down: 1942
- Launched: 1943
- Commissioned: 1943

United States
- Commissioned: 19 September 1947
- Fate: Sank after collision on 7 December 1968

General characteristics
- Length: 133 ft (41 m)
- Beam: 30 ft (9.1 m)
- Draft: 8 ft 9 in (2.67 m) maximum
- Propulsion: 2 × 600 bhp (450 kW) diesels with twin screws
- Speed: 10.5 kn (19.4 km/h; 12.1 mph)
- Range: 2,450 nmi (4,540 km; 2,820 mi) at 10.5 kn (19.4 km/h; 12.1 mph); 2,830 nmi (5,240 km; 3,260 mi) at 7.5 kn (13.9 km/h; 8.6 mph)
- Complement: 1 warrant, 20 crewmen (1948)

The USCGC White Alder (WLM/WAGL-541) was the former Navy lighter, YF-417. The United States Coast Guard acquired a total of eight of these former Navy YF-257-class lighters between 1947 and 1948 for conversion to coastal buoy tenders. They were needed to complement the larger seagoing buoy tenders in servicing short-range-aids-to-navigation, typically those placed in coastal waters and harbors.

They were built entirely of steel and were originally designed to carry ammunition and cargo from shore to deep-draft vessels anchored off-shore. These lighters were well suited for a variety of coastal tasks because their hull design incorporated a shallow draft with a solid engineering plant. All of these 133-foot (41 m) lighters had sufficient cargo space for storing equipment and an open deck and boom for handling large objects. They proved to be capable and useful buoy tenders. Each was named for a plant, shrub or tree, prefixed by "White."

== Tender history ==
White Alder was stationed at New Orleans, Louisiana throughout her Coast Guard career, which spanned 1947 until 1968. Her primary assignment was to tend river aids-to-navigation although she was called upon to conduct other traditional Coast Guard duties, such as search and rescue or law enforcement duties, as required. In mid-November 1965 she escorted raised barge carrying chlorine to a chemical plant and on 4 December 1968 she refloated cutter USCGC Loganberry (WLI-65305), which had been beached on 3 December.

At approximately 18:29 CST on 7 December 1968, the "downbound" White Alder collided with the "upbound" M/V Helena, a 455-foot (139 m) Taiwanese freighter in the Mississippi River at mile 195.3 above Head of Passes near White Castle, Louisiana and sank in 75 feet (23 m) of water. Three of the crew of 20 were rescued, while the other 17 perished. Divers recovered the bodies of three of the dead but river sediment buried the cutter so quickly that continued recovery and salvage operations proved impractical. The Coast Guard decided to leave the remaining 14 crewmen entombed in the sunken cutter, which remains buried in the bottom of the Mississippi River.

The Coast Guard dedicated a memorial, at the Coast Guard base in New Orleans, to the White Alder and her crew on 7 December 1969. The memorial was moved to the new Coast Guard Group New Orleans offices in Metairie, Louisiana, and rededicated on 6 December 2002.

== Sources ==
- This article contains public domain text from the United States Coats Guard Historian’s Office website.
- http://www.uscg.mil/history/WEBCUTTERS/NPS_133_HAER_Report.pdf
- Cutter History File. USCG Historian's Office, USCG HQ, Washington, D.C.
- Scheina, Robert (1990). U.S. Coast Guard Cutters & Craft, 1946-1990. Annapolis, Maryland: Naval Institute Press.
- U. S. Department of the Interior. National Park Service. U.S. Coast Guard 133-foot (41 m) Buoy Tenders. HAER booklet. Washington, DC: National Park Service, February, 2004. [ HAER no. DC-57; Todd Croteau, HAER Industrial Archeologist (project leader); Jet Low, HAER Photographer; Mark Porter, NCSHPO Consultant (historian), and Candace Clifford, booklet design. ]
