= Kidnapping of Barbara Mackle =

1968 kidnapping in Georgia, US

Barbara Mackle
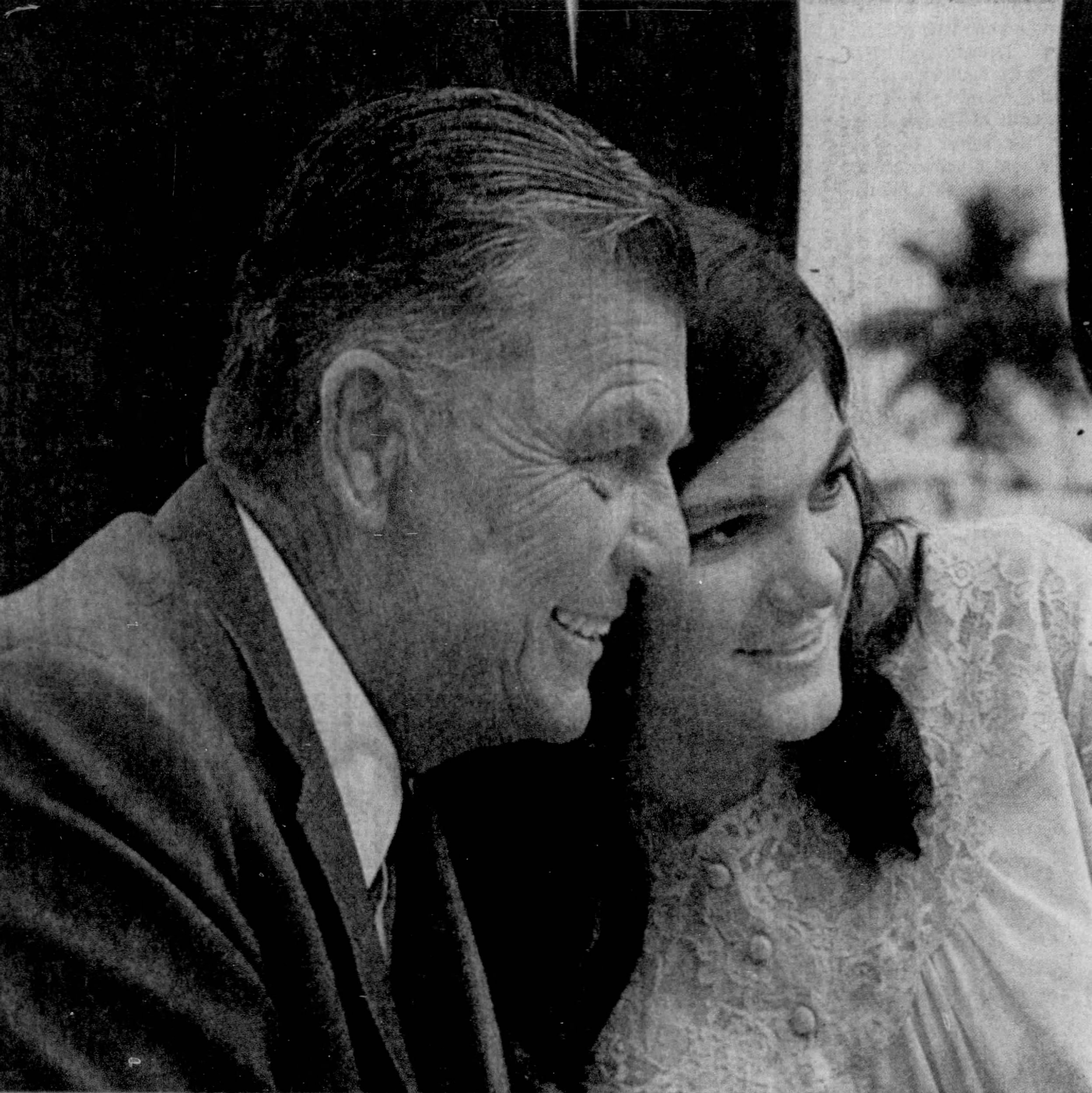
- Mackle (right) with her father Robert after being rescued
- Born: 1948 (age 77–78)
- Parent: Robert Mackle

The 1968 kidnapping of Barbara Jane Mackle was the subject of an autobiographical book which was the basis of two television movies.

== Background ==
Barbara Jane Mackle was born in 1948 to Robert and Jane Mackle. Robert was a property developer and cofounder of the $65 million Deltona Corporation, a major homebuilding company. Barbara has an older brother, four years her senior.

== Timeline ==
=== Events before kidnapping ===
Mackle was attending Emory University in Atlanta, Georgia, when she fell ill with the Hong Kong flu after a pandemic struck the campus. Her mother traveled to Atlanta to drive her back to the family home in Coral Gables, Florida, for the Christmas break. Before they departed, they stayed at a nearby Rodeway Inn. That night, Barbara's best friend, Stewart Hunt Woodward, visited them.

=== Kidnapping ===
At approximately 4 a.m. on December 17, 1968, prison escapee Gary Steven Krist and his accomplice, Ruth Eisemann-Schier, knocked on the door of the room Barbara and Jane were sharing at the Rodeway Inn. Both perpetrators were wearing ski masks and Gary was armed with a shotgun. From outside, Krist told Barbara that there had been a traffic accident. Fearing that it may have been Stewart involved in the accident, Mrs. Mackle let them in. Once inside, Krist and Eisemann-Schier chloroformed and bound Jane before forcing Barbara at gunpoint into the back of their waiting car, informing her that she was being kidnapped. They drove Barbara to a remote pine stand off South Berkeley Lake Road in Gwinnett County near Lawrenceville and buried her in a shallow trench inside a fiberglass-reinforced box. The box was outfitted with an air pump, a battery-powered lamp, water laced with sedatives, and food. Two plastic pipes provided Mackle with outside air.

=== Ransom demand ===
Eisemann-Schier and Krist demanded a $500,000 ransom from Mackle's father. The first attempt at a ransom drop was disrupted when two policemen drove by. The kidnappers fled on foot and the FBI found their car abandoned. Inside the car were photographs of a man with a policeman's hat and the car registration in the name of George Deacon.

The second ransom drop was successful, but there was no word from the kidnappers. The FBI was able to trace George Deacon to the University of Miami, where they discovered he built ventilated boxes for a living at the Institute for Marine Science. Deacon's boss provided the name of Ruth Eisemann-Schier, who also worked at the university, as someone Deacon spent time with. The FBI was contacted by a local man in Georgia claiming he had just bought a small trailer from a man and found some odd paperwork inside. The FBI found letters addressed to George Deacon and Gary Krist, who had escaped from a California prison in 1966. When the FBI compared fingerprints found in the car to those found in Krist's file, they discovered Deacon and Krist were one and the same.

=== Rescue ===
On December 20, Krist called and gave a switchboard operator of the FBI vague directions to Mackle's location. The FBI set up their base in Lawrenceville, Gwinnett's county seat, and more than 100 agents spread out through the area in an attempt to find her, digging the ground with their hands and anything they could find to use. Mackle was found and rescued, suffering from dehydration but otherwise unharmed. She had spent more than three days buried underground.

Mackle was asked how she had remained so positive not only during the kidnapping but after, when she showed no ill effects from the ordeal. She claimed she would imagine spending Christmas with her family and never doubted she would be rescued.

=== Aftermath ===
Barbara was returned to her family after being rescued. She later married and had children.

== Arrests and convictions of the perpetrators ==
Krist was arrested while hiding in a swamp after a tip led a search towards Florida that began on December 20, 1968, and went on through half the night. Eisemann-Schier was arrested March 5, 1969 in Norman, Oklahoma. She had applied for a job at a hospital and as part of the background check a fingerprint match was found by the Oklahoma State Bureau of Investigation. Eisemann-Schier claimed she left Miami because she and Krist became separated after the money drop and she was unable to get back to the car and thought Krist had abandoned her. She was convicted and sentenced to seven years in prison, paroled after serving four years, and deported to her native Honduras.

Krist was convicted and sentenced to life in prison in 1969, but was released on parole after ten years. Krist received a pardon to allow him to attend medical school. He practiced medicine in Indiana before his license was revoked in 2003 for lying about a disciplinary action received during his residency.

In March 2006, Krist was arrested on a sailboat off the coast of Alabama with 14 kilograms (31 lb) of cocaine, reportedly worth about $1 million, and four undocumented people. He was sentenced to five years and five months in prison and released in November 2010.

On August 27, 2012, in Mobile, Alabama, U.S. District Judge Callie V. Granade revoked Krist's supervised release for violation of his probation. He had left the country without permission, sailing to Cuba and South America on his sailboat. Judge Granade sentenced Krist to 40 months' imprisonment.

== Books and movies ==
Mackle wrote a book (with The Miami Herald reporter Gene Miller) about her experience: 83 Hours Till Dawn, published in 1970. ABC aired the story in 1972 as part of its ABC Movie of the Week showcase under the title The Longest Night. In 1990, the book was made into a second television movie, 83 Hours 'Til Dawn.

Krist also wrote a book, Life: The Man Who Kidnapped Barbara Jane Mackle, published in 1972. The 1973 exploitation film The Candy Snatchers is loosely based on the Mackle kidnapping.

== Television movies ==
- The Longest Night (1972)
- 83 Hours 'Til Dawn (1990)
- TV Series: FBI: The Untold Stories "Buried Alive" (S1E13) (1991)
- TV Series: A Crime to Remember "Coffin for Christmas" (S5E4) (2018)

== See also ==
- Kidnapping of Ursula Herrmann – 1981 crime in Germany
- List of kidnappings (1960–1969)
- List of solved missing person cases (1950–1969)
- Miller v. Universal City Studios, Inc. – 1981 case in United States copyright law
