= Gary Steven Krist =

American criminal

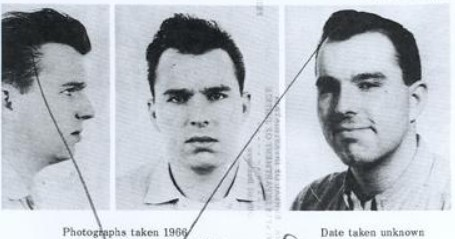

FBI Ten Most Wanted Fugitive

Description
- Born: April 29, 1945 (age 81); Aberdeen, Washington

Status
- Convictions: Kidnapping
- Penalty: Life in prison (served 10 years)
- Added: December 20, 1968
- Number: 292

Gary Steven Krist (born April 29, 1945) is an American convicted of kidnapping and the trafficking of illegal immigrants.

== Early life ==
Krist was born in Aberdeen, Washington, on April 29, 1945, and grew up in Pelican, Alaska. He lived part of his childhood in Utah. His first recorded crime was a string of robberies at the age of 14 in 1959. He escaped with another prisoner from Deuel Vocational Institution, a California state prison, in November 1966, while serving a sentence for automobile theft. The other prisoner was killed during the attempt.

== Mackle kidnapping ==
Krist is best known for kidnapping heiress Barbara Jane Mackle and burying her alive in a ventilated box in 1968. After receiving $500,000 in ransom money, he was captured and sentenced to life in prison in 1969, but was released on parole after 10 years and went on to commit several more crimes.

While imprisoned, Krist wrote a book, Life: The Man Who Kidnapped Barbara Jane Mackle, published in 1972.

== Parole and medical practice ==
Krist was paroled after serving 10 years and granted a pardon after he was accepted to medical school at the Autonomous University of Guadalajara in Mexico so that he could become a physician. In December 2001, after his application to practice medicine in Alabama was rejected, the Medical Licensing Board of Indiana granted him a probationary license, under which he was required to report to the board every six months and submit to psychiatric evaluation, and was prohibited from prescribing certain drugs. He practiced medicine in Chrisney, Indiana, until his medical license was revoked in 2003, as a result of not disclosing a disciplinary action he had received during his medical residency.

== Later crimes ==
Krist chartered a boat to South America in January 2006. When he returned on March 6, 2006, authorities were waiting for him and discovered four undocumented immigrants, who paid $6,000 each to come to the United States, and 14 kilograms of cocaine in paste form valued at around US$1 million. He was arrested in Point Clear, Alabama, for conspiracy to bring cocaine and illegal immigrants into the United States. It was also discovered that he was running a cocaine operation in Barrow County, Georgia. On May 16, 2006, Krist pleaded guilty to drug smuggling; and, on January 19, 2007, he was sentenced to five years and five months in prison at the Federal Correctional Institution in Marianna, Florida. He was released from prison in November 2010.

On August 27, 2012, in Mobile, Alabama, U.S. District Judge Callie V. Granade revoked Krist's supervised release for violating his probation. He had left the country without permission, sailing to Cuba and South America on his sailboat. Judge Granade sentenced Krist to 40 months imprisonment. The Federal Bureau of Prisons indicates he was released on July 2, 2015.

== See also ==
- List of fugitives from justice who disappeared
- Ruth Eisemann-Schier
