= List of solved missing person cases (pre-1950) =

This is a list of solved missing person cases of people who went missing in unknown locations or unknown circumstances that were eventually explained by their reappearance or the recovery of their bodies, the conviction of the perpetrator(s) responsible for their disappearances, or a confession to their killings. This list includes disappearances before 1950. There are separate lists covering disappearances between 1950 and 1969, List of solved missing person cases (1970s), List of solved missing person cases (1980s), List of solved missing person cases (1990s) and then since 2000.

== Before 1800 ==
Date	Person(s)	Age	Country of disappearance	Circumstances	Outcome	Time spent missing or unconfirmed
1578	Andronikos Kantakouzenos	25	Ottoman Empire (modern-day Turkey)	Andronikos Kantakouzenos was an Ottoman Greek entrepreneur and political figure who was persecuted by the Ottoman Empire for anti-Ottoman rhetoric. He fled to Istanbul, where he was briefly detained as a galley slave before he was released. He then went on to rebuild his business and involve himself in Wallachian and Moldavian politics before his disappearance and likely execution in 1601.	Found alive	Unknown
1606	John Knight	21	Unknown	John Knight was a British explorer who disappeared after his ship needed repairs. Knight had gone over a hill most likely near Nain, Labrador, on June 23 or 24, 1606. Some time after that it was confirmed that he had been killed by local residents, but these people were never identified and no one was charged with his murder. Knight's body was never located after that.	Murdered	Never found
1630s	Turhan Sultan	Unknown	Unknown	Russian, Ukrainian or Circassian girl kidnapped and later sold as a slave by the Tatars to the Ottoman Imperial Harem, later becoming a wife of Sultan Ibrahim. As a result, she became a prominent figure during the Sultanate of Women.	Found alive	Unknown
1658	Udriște Năsturel	59–63	Wallachia (modern-day Romania)	Wallachian scholar, poet and statesman known for bringing on a cultural revival in the nation. He and several other consorts were later kidnapped and murdered, allegedly because they disagreed with a fellow boyar's plans for an anti-Ottoman uprising.	Murdered	Unknown
1660	William Harrison	70	England	William Harrison disappeared on August 16, 1660, from the town of Chipping Campden, Gloucestershire, and was thought to have been murdered. He resurfaced two years later and said that he had been kidnapped.	Found alive	2 years
1700s	Adriaan de Bruin	Unknown	Unknown	African boy enslaved to be servant to Dutch politician Adriaan van Bredehoff, best known for posing together with his master for a portrait by Nikolaas Verkolje, which today is on exhibit in the Westfries Museum.	Found alive	30 years
1703	Abram Petrovich Gannibal	7–8	Unknown	Ethiopian son of a prince who was captured by Ottomans and later sold as a slave to the Russian Empire. However, Tsar Peter the Great took a liking to him for his intelligence and military potential, and thus, Abram was made his godson. Gannibal went on to have an illustrious career as a nobleman and military engineer until his death in 1781.	Found alive	1 year
1704	Stephen Williams	9	Thirteen Colonies (modern-day United States)	American boy who was kidnapped during a raid by French soldier and their Native American accomplices on February 29, 1704. He was held captive in Canada, where Jesuits attempted to convert him to Catholicism. He was released following a prisoner exchange and returned to Massachusetts, where he later became a Congregational minister.	Found alive	1 year
1721	Marie-Angélique Memmie Le Blanc	9	France	Marie-Angélique Memmie Le Blanc, later known as the “Wild Girl of Champagne” or the “Wild Child of Songy,” disappeared after running away and lived in the forests of France for approximately ten years, from about age nine to nineteen, before being captured by villagers near Songy in Champagne in September 1731.	Found alive	10 years
1723	Philip Ashton	21	Thirteen Colonies (modern-day United States)	American castaway who lived on the uninhabited Roatán island for 16 months, where he went into hiding to avoid trouble with pirates.	Found alive	More than 1 year
1725	Jacobus Capitein	8	Dutch Gold Coast (modern-day Ghana)	Ghanaian boy who was enslaved and later brought to the Netherlands, where he ostensibly was to live as a servant to a Jacobus van Goch, a trader with the Dutch West India Company. Instead, Van Goch allowed Capitein to study theology and became a Christian minister and the first African to be ordained by the Dutch Reformed Church, who later spread the written word to his native Ghana.	Found alive	3 years
1727	The girl of Issaux	Unknown	France	A French feral child who was discovered 8 years later, after disappearing into the wilderness.	Found alive	Uncertain
1732	Rachel Chiesley, Lady Grange	53	Scotland	The wife of Jacobite lawyer James Erskine, Lord Grange, Chiesley was kidnapped by her husband for allegedly writing anti-Hanoverian letters. She was detained in multiple locations across Scotland, and despite a rescue attempt by her lawyer Thomas Hope, she died in captivity.	Died in captivity	13 years
1753	Elizabeth Canning	19	England	English maidservant who claimed to have been kidnapped and held hostage in a hayloft. Three people were later convicted of the alleged kidnapping, but later pardoned following an investigation by the Lord Mayor of London, Crisp Gascoyne. Canning was sentenced to one month imprisonment for perjury, but whether she was truly abducted remains a mystery to this day.	Found alive	1 month
1767	Little Ephraim Robin John		Modern-day Nigeria	Nigerian slave-trader-turned-slave Efiks from Calabar, who were sold as slaves to British traders after being captured on a slave trade expedition themselves. They were sold to various buyers around the world as their intelligence, literacy and knowledge of the slave trade were considered valuable assets due to their experience in the same. In the 1790s, they successfully petitioned the British courts to be released and returned to Calabar, where they spread Christianity.	Found alive	More than 30 years
1767	Ancona Robin John		Modern-day Nigeria	Nigerian slave-trader-turned-slave Efiks from Calabar, who were sold as slaves to British traders after being captured on a slave trade expedition themselves. They were sold to various buyers around the world as their intelligence, literacy and knowledge of the slave trade were considered valuable assets due to their experience in the same. In the 1790s, they successfully petitioned the British courts to be released and returned to Calabar, where they spread Christianity.	Found alive	More than 30 years
1773	Victor of Aveyron	Unknown	France	A French feral child who was found around the age of 9 after being missing for the previous two years.	Found alive	Uncertain
1799	Gulielma "Elma" Sands	Unknown	United States of America	Gulielma Sands disappeared in Manhattan of December 22, 1799 in the evening time. The next year on January 2 her body was found in the newly created Manhattan Well.	Murdered	11 days

== 1800s ==
Date	Person(s)	Age	Country of disappearance	Circumstances	Outcome	Time spent missing or unconfirmed
1800	Davy Crockett	13	United States of America	Future American politician and leading participant in the Texas Revolution. Crockett ran away from home in 1800 at the age of thirteen. He returned to the family tavern of his own volition in 1802.	Found alive	Over 2 years
1800	Dominique Clément de Ris	50	France	French senator who was abducted from his home on the orders of Police Minister Joseph Fouché, who wanted to retrieve compromising documents from Clément de Ris's home. The senator was later released by his captors. The kidnapping formed the basis of the novel Une ténébreuse affaire, by Honoré de Balzac.	Found alive	19 days
1823	Quamina	45	Dutch Gold Coast (modern-day Ghana)	Ghanaian Akan man, who as a child was enslaved on Guinea with his mother and later, together with his son Jack Gladstone, were main participants in the Demerara rebellion of 1823, one of the largest slave revolts in the British colonies' history. He was apprehended by colonial authorities on September 16, 1823, and subsequently executed.	Executed	1 month
1824	Aimée Debully	12	France	A schoolgirl murdered and cannibalized by Antoine Léger on August 10, 1824, Léger—a hermit—buried the child's body in his cave. Debully's body was discovered on August 16. Léger was subsequently executed by guillotine on November 30.	Murdered	Six days
1831	Collet Barker	46	Australia	An officer serving in the British military, Collet Barker was also noted as an early explorer of the Australian territories, recording his encounters with the natives in the process. On April 29, 1831, he and his party were sent out to explore whether the Murray River had other channels connecting to the sea, and that day Barker swam across the channel, but never returned. His party members later learned that he had been killed by a local indigenous tribe who had mistaken him for a whaler.	Murdered	Never found
1836	Cynthia Ann Parker	10	Republic of Texas (now part of the United States of America)	Parker was abducted at age 10 by a Comanche war band that had attacked her family's settlement in the Fort Parker massacre. She remained with this tribe for 24 years, becoming integrated and later marrying a tribe member. She was recovered by Texas Rangers in December 1860.	Found alive	24 years
1841	Solomon Northup	32–33	United States of America	Northup was a free-born African American man from New York. In 1841 he was offered a traveling musician job in Washington D.C. (where slavery was legal). He was drugged and kidnapped into slavery for 12 years until he met Samuel Bass, a Canadian working on his plantation who helped get word to New York, where state law provided aid to free New York citizens who had been kidnapped and sold into slavery. His family and friends enlisted the aid of the Governor of New York, Washington Hunt, and Northup regained his freedom on January 3, 1853.	Found alive	12 years
1844	Charlotte Dymond	18	England	A Cornish farm servant went missing and was found dead a week later on Bodmin Moor murdered by her boyfriend.	Murdered	1 week
1851	Olive Oatman	14	United States of America	Oatman and her younger sister, Mary Ann, were both taken as slaves in 1851 by a Native American tribe following the massacre of their family close to Yuma, Arizona. Held captive for a year by this tribe, they were later traded to Mohaves, where they were treated less harshly, although in approximately 1855 Mary Ann died of starvation at the approximate age of 11. With a measure of threats, Olive was released by this tribe after five years of captivity in 1856, at the age of 19.	Found alive	5 years
1851	Mary Ann Oatman	7	United States of America	Oatman and her older sister, Olive, were both taken as slaves in 1851 by a Native American tribe following the massacre of their family close to Yuma, Arizona. Both were later traded to the Mohave people. Mary Ann died of starvation at the approximate age of 11 in approximately 1855. Her older sister was later released.	Died prior to rescue	5 years
1851	Francis Jackson	36–41	United States of America	African-American freedman who was kidnapped and sold as a slave in Virginia. During his repeated attempts to escape from slaveholders in Virginia and North Carolina, Jackson was eventually legally declared free and released in August 1858, later moving to Pennsylvania.	Found alive	7 years
1856	George Cox	7	United States of America	The two young brothers disappeared from their Pavia Township, Pennsylvania, home on April 24, 1856, after straying off the beaten path. Their bodies were found several days later with the help of a local farmer, who claimed to have seen the location in his dreams.	Died (undetermined cause)	8 days
1856	Joseph Cox	5	United States of America	The two young brothers disappeared from their Pavia Township, Pennsylvania, home on April 24, 1856, after straying off the beaten path. Their bodies were found several days later with the help of a local farmer, who claimed to have seen the location in his dreams.	Died (undetermined cause)	8 days
1857	Abbie Gardner-Sharp	14	United States of America	Abducted in the aftermath of the Spirit Lake Massacre on March 8, 1857, and kept as a hostage by her Santee Sioux abductors until her ransom was paid off in May of that year.	Found alive	2 months
1860	Redoshi	12	Modern-day Benin	West African woman who was illegally brought as a slave to Alabama, sold to the Washington Smith family. She was one of the last known living victims of the Transatlantic slave trade.	Found alive	Unknown
1863	Harrison Carroll Hobart	48	United States of America	Union Army officer who was captured during the Battle of Chickamauga, but escaped captivity in Virginia together with his regiment only a year later. He later returned to serving the Union, later serving as a politician in Wisconsin until his death.	Found alive	7 months
1864	Samuel J. Reader	28	United States of America	Diarist who served in the army during the Bleeding Kansas, recording events on the battlefields. In October 1864, during the Battle of Little Blue River, he was captured by enemy forces for three days, but later escaped.	Found alive	3 days
1865	William John Charles Möens	32	Kingdom of Italy	English writer and antiquarian who was kidnapped by brigands on May 15, 1865, while on vacation near Battipaglia, Italy. He was released on August 26, after paying his kidnappers £5100 ransom.	Found alive	4 months
1869	Onesimos Nesib	13–14	Ethiopian Empire	Ethiopian Oromo boy who was kidnapped by slavers to be sold in the Arabian Peninsula, but later rescued by Werner Munzinger, who brought him to the Johannelunds Teologiska Högskola to study theology. He later converted to Christianity and went on to translate the Bible into Oromo, and to publish numerous other works in the language.	Found alive	3 years
1870	Truman C. Everts	54	United States of America	Tax assessor for the Montana Territory who got lost during an expedition on September 9, 1870. He was found by two mountain men on October 16, suffering from frostbite and other ailments. He later published an account of his experience, titled "Thirty-Seven Days of Peril".	Found alive	37 days
1871	Mary Winchester	6	British Raj (modern-day India)	Scottish girl who was kidnapped and held hostage by Mizo tribesman in Mizoram, India, on January 23, 1871. She was held for over a year before being rescued by the British army during the Lushai Expedition.	Found alive	1 year
1874	Katie Mary Curran	10	United States of America	The first known murder victim of Jesse Pomeroy. Curran disappeared while on an errand to purchase a notebook; her body was later discovered concealed in an ash heap within the basement of Pomeroy's mother's dressmaking shop.	Murdered	3 months
1877	Josephine Bakhita	7–8	Egypt Eyalet (modern-day Sudan)	Sudanese Daju girl who was kidnapped and repeatedly sold to Arab traders until slavery was outlawed by the British (who then controlled the country). Later on, she converted to Catholicism and served as a Canossian religious sister for 45 years.	Found alive	12 years
June 21st or 22nd, 1878	Henry Wadge	2	United Kingdom	Henry "Harry" Wadge's mother, Selina Wadge, took him, along with his older brother John, on a day trip to allegedly meet her boyfriend. The next day, June 22nd, 1878, Selina returned without Harry, alleging that he had died during the trip. John later reported that Selina had dropped his brother in a well.	Murdered	2 days
1886	Aster Ganno	14	Ethiopian Empire	Ganno was an Ethiopian girl enslaved by the Limmu-Ennarea and later rescued by Italian missionaries while en route to be sold in the Arabian Peninsula. She was later taken to a Swedish Evangelical Mission, and later assigned to translate the Bible in Oromo.	Found alive	Unknown
1887	Mary Tuplin	17	Canada	Tuplin was a murder victim from Margate, Prince Edward Island, Canada. Her body was discovered weighted to a river bed six days after her disappearance. She had been shot twice in the head. Tuplin's alleged lover, 19-year-old William Millman, was arrested. He was convicted of her murder the following year and subsequently hanged. Millman's execution was the final to occur on Prince Edward Island in the 19th century.	Murdered	6 days
1887	Marie Hottwagner	c. 18–24	Austria-Hungary	The young woman went missing and was found to be murdered 20 days later.	Murdered	20 days
1892	Gottlieb Fluhmann	c. 55	United States of America	The Colorado rancher known as Gottlieb Fluhmann was last seen in 1892 before he disappeared under strange and largely unknown circumstances. His body was found in 1944 in a Park County cave, but the cause of death could not be determined.	Died (unknown cause)	52 years
1894	Régis Planial	55	France	Régis Planial, a 55-year-old furniture dealer, disappeared from his home in Lyon on 7 December 1894. Four days later, a sailor fishing in the River Rhône near the island of Pierre-Bénite, off the coast of Saint-Fons, found a bag containing the upper half of a human torso. He had been murdered by serial killer Luigi Richetto.	Murdered	4 days
1895	Albert Enstrom	22	United States	Three ranch hands whose bodies were discovered in Utah Lake near Pelican Point, Utah County, Utah, in 1895. The murders may have been committed due to a property dispute. Despite an extensive investigation, publicized trials, and the involvement of multiple law enforcement agencies, the case remains unsolved.	Murdered	2 months
1895	Andrew Johnson	20	United States	Three ranch hands whose bodies were discovered in Utah Lake near Pelican Point, Utah County, Utah, in 1895. The murders may have been committed due to a property dispute. Despite an extensive investigation, publicized trials, and the involvement of multiple law enforcement agencies, the case remains unsolved.	Murdered	2 months
1895	Alfred Nelson	17	United States	Three ranch hands whose bodies were discovered in Utah Lake near Pelican Point, Utah County, Utah, in 1895. The murders may have been committed due to a property dispute. Despite an extensive investigation, publicized trials, and the involvement of multiple law enforcement agencies, the case remains unsolved.	Murdered	2 months
1895	Bridget Cleary	25–26	United Kingdom of Great Britain and Ireland	Irishwoman who vanished from her home in Ballyvadlea on March 16, 1895, with her husband claiming that she had been abducted by fairies. Cleary's body was found several days later, and her husband, among four others, was later convicted of her death.	Murdered	6 days
1896	Pearl Bryan	22	United States of America	Pregnant woman who went missing on January 28, 1896, ostensibly to visit a friend in Indianapolis, but her decapitated corpse was later found in Fort Thomas, Kentucky. Her lover, dental student Scott Jackson, and his roommate, Alonzo Walling, were later arrested, convicted and executed for the murder.	Murdered	4 days
1898	Adolf Böcking	47	United States of America	Adolf Böcking was a German man who after moving to the U.S. disappeared from San Antonio, Texas on April 18, 1898. He was later found dead after he had committed suicide with a gun.	Suicide	Unknown

== 1900s ==
Date	Person(s)	Age	Country of disappearance	Circumstances	Outcome	Time spent missing or unconfirmed
1900	Ernst Winter	19	Germany	Ernst Winter was a German man who went missing from Konitz on March 11, 1900, after he had left the house where he was boarding. Parts of his body were found on March 15, 1900 and April 15, 1900, having been killed and dismembered. His murder is unsolved.	Murdered	4 days to 1 month
1901	Hermann Stubbe	8	German Empire	Hermann and Peter Stubbe disappeared while playing close to their home in the Baltic resort of Göhren on July 1, 1901; their mutilated bodies were discovered the following day. Both had been extensively bludgeoned with a large stone prior to their mutilation. A local carpenter, Ludwig Tessnow, was arrested the same day. He was later sentenced to death for the murders, and is alleged to have died via guillotine in the courtyard of Greifswald prison in 1904.	Murdered	1 day
1901	Peter Stubbe	6	German Empire	Hermann and Peter Stubbe disappeared while playing close to their home in the Baltic resort of Göhren on July 1, 1901; their mutilated bodies were discovered the following day. Both had been extensively bludgeoned with a large stone prior to their mutilation. A local carpenter, Ludwig Tessnow, was arrested the same day. He was later sentenced to death for the murders, and is alleged to have died via guillotine in the courtyard of Greifswald prison in 1904.	Murdered	1 day
1902	William Llewellyn	5	Wales	William Llewellyn was a five-year-old male Welsh child, who disappeared on 11 April 1902, while he was in the Rhigos mountains and was found dead on 26 April 1902.	Unknown	3 weeks
1905	Unnamed Japanese teenage girl	16	Japan	An unnamed Japanese teenage girl was abducted on September 1, 1905, from a festival that was held in Asahi at a shrine by male serial killer Katsutaro Baba and found dead nine days later after she had been murdered by him.	Murdered	9 days
1907	Unnamed Japanese woman	48	Japan	An unnamed Japanese woman disappeared in the vicinity of Asahi in January 1907 and was found dead one month later after being murdered by Katsutaro Baba.	Murdered	1 month
1907	Shirley Davidson	32	Canada	Davidson, a Canadian ice hockey player for the Montreal Victorias, disappeared while sailing near Varennes, Quebec on August 5, 1907. His body, along with that of his fiancée, was found five days later, with the most prominent theory suggesting that the pair died in a suicide pact.	Died by suspected suicide	5 days
1909	Elsie Sigel	19	United States	Elsie Sigel, American teenage woman who went missing on June 9, 1909, from New York City and was found dead on June 18, 1909, after being killed.	Murdered	9 days

== 1910s ==
Date	Person(s)	Age	Country of disappearance	Circumstances	Outcome	Time spent missing or unconfirmed
1910	Thomas Bedden	19	United States of America	Thomas Bedden was kidnapped by and is known to have been murdered by serial killer Albert Fish.	Murdered	Never found
1910	José María Grimaldos López	28	Spain	José María Grimaldos López, a shepherd from Tresjuncos, Spain, went missing on August 20, 1910. Two men were convicted of his killing after confessing under torture. Grimaldos resurfaced in 1926.	Found alive	16 years
1911	Elsie Paroubek	5	United States of America	Elsie Paroubek was a Czech American girl who disappeared in Chicago, Illinois, on April 8, 1911. On May 9, 1911, employees of the Lockport power plant near Joliet, thirty-five miles outside of Chicago, saw a body floating in the Chicago Sanitary and Ship Canal that was identified as hers.	Died from suffocation	31 days
1912	Teresita Guitart Congost	Unknown	Spain	Teresita Guitart Congost was kidnapped by Enriqueta Martí from Carrer de Joaquín Costa, Barcelona and was located seventeen days later.	Found alive	17 Days
1913	Captain Robert Falcon Scott	43	Antarctica	The bodies of Scott's group, except Oates and Evans, were found 13 months after separating from the support party to make the final part of the journey to the South Pole. The search party had been postponed by the Antarctic winter.	Died from hypothermia and starvation	13 months
1913	Edward Wilson	39	Antarctica	The bodies of Scott's group, except Oates and Evans, were found 13 months after separating from the support party to make the final part of the journey to the South Pole. The search party had been postponed by the Antarctic winter.	Died from hypothermia and starvation	13 months
1913	Henry Bowers	28	Antarctica	The bodies of Scott's group, except Oates and Evans, were found 13 months after separating from the support party to make the final part of the journey to the South Pole. The search party had been postponed by the Antarctic winter.	Died from hypothermia and starvation	13 months
1913	Edgar Evans	35	Antarctica	The bodies of Scott's group, except Oates and Evans, were found 13 months after separating from the support party to make the final part of the journey to the South Pole. The search party had been postponed by the Antarctic winter.	Died from hypothermia and starvation	13 months
1913	Lawrence Oates	32	Antarctica	The bodies of Scott's group, except Oates and Evans, were found 13 months after separating from the support party to make the final part of the journey to the South Pole. The search party had been postponed by the Antarctic winter.	Died from hypothermia and starvation	Never found
1913	Charles B. Stover	52	United States of America	The New York City Parks Commissioner from 1910 to 1913, Stover disappeared one day in October 1913 after going out for lunch. Over the next few months, nation-wide searches were organized to locate him, only for him to mail a letter of resignation and eventually return safely from an apparent vacation on January 28, 1914.	Found alive	3 months
1914–1918	Jack Cock	22–25	Unknown	Cock was reported as "missing, presumed dead" at an uncertain point during World War I, but later turned up alive. After his service, he went on to have an illustrious career as a professional footballer, small-time actor and a pub owner until his death in 1966.	Found alive	Unknown
1914	Larrett Roebuck	25	France	Roebuck was the first English Football League player to be killed in the First World War. He was recorded as "presumed dead" after an attack near Beaucamps-Ligny during the Race to the Sea. His death was confirmed by two comrades in January 1915.	Killed in action	Body never found
1914	Charles Pelham, Lord Worsley	27	Belgium	Charles Pelham, Lord Worsley was a British soldier whose parents were Charles Pelham, 4th Earl of Yarborough and Marcia Pelham, Countess of Yarborough. He served as a lieutenant in C Squadron of the Royal Horse Guards during hostilities in Flanders, commanding a machine gun section. On 30 October 1914, Worsley's section was cut off at Zandvoorde, Belgium, by a German attack and he was listed as missing in action, and then as dead early in 1915. His body was buried by German soldiers, and with the help of a map, his grave was located in December 1918.	Killed in action	4 years
1915	Alan Cordner	24	Ottoman Empire	Cordner, an Australian rules footballer and a private in the B Company of the 6th Battalion of the First AIF, was killed at Cape Helles in Ottoman Turkey during the initial invasion of the Gallipoli peninsula. He was initially posted as "wounded", then "wounded and missing". Some twelve months after the Red Cross conducted an investigation into his fate, he was declared "killed in action". His body was never recovered.	Killed in action	Body never found
1915	John Isaac	35	France	Isaac, an English first class cricketer and a captain in the 2nd battalion, Rifle Brigade, was posted as missing at Fromelles, France during the northern attack of the Battle of Aubers Ridge on May 9, 1915. His body was recovered in April 1921 and identified by the medal ribbons. He was subsequently reburied at New Irish Farm Cemetery, Ypres, West, Belgium.	Killed in action	Almost 6 years
1915	John Kipling	18	France	John Kipling was the only son of British author Rudyard Kipling. He was reported injured and missing in action on September 27, 1915, during the Battle of Loos. His grave was identified by military historian Norm Christie, but in 2002 research by military historians Tonie and Valmai Holt suggested that this grave was not that of Kipling but of another officer. In January 2016, however, further research by Graham Parker and Joanna Legg demonstrated that the original identification of the grave was correct. John Kipling's death inspired his father Rudyard to become involved with the Commonwealth War Graves Commission and write a wartime history of the Irish Guards.	Killed in action	101 years
1916	Willie Wiseman	20	France	Wiseman, a member of the Gordon Highlanders, was wounded during service on the Western Front, remaining missing for a week. He later returned and continued his service, and after leaving the army, became an amateur footballer playing for Queen's Park F.C.	Found alive	1 week
1916	Will Streets	30	France	Streets, an English World War I soldier and poet, went missing after being wounded on the first day of the Battle of the Somme. His body was recovered exactly ten months later and buried at Euston Road Cemetery, Colincamps, France.	Killed in action	10 months
1916	Thornton Clarke	24	France	Clarke, an Australian rules footballer who served with the 60th Infantry Battalion in the First AIF, was killed in action on July 19, 1916, soon after arriving on the Western Front, during the Battle of Fromelles. Initially listed as missing, he was declared killed by a Court of Enquiry held in France on August 4, 1917. It is now known that Clarke was buried in a mass grave.	Killed in action	Body never found
1916	Sidney Cowan	19	France	Cowan, an Irish World War I flying ace, collided with another British aircraft while attempting to attack a German machine on November 17, 1916. Originally listed as missing, his grave was discovered in April 1917. The Germans had buried him at the cemetery at Ablainzevelle. He was later re-interred at the British War Cemetery at Cagnicourt.	Killed in air collision	5 months
1917	Alf Williamson	23	France	An Australian rules footballer, Williamson was reported wounded and missing in action in France on April 11, 1917. It was later determined in late November 1917 that he had died in action at Bullecourt in France fighting with the 14th Battalion.	Killed in action	Body never found
1917	Bill Madden	35	France	An Australian rules footballer who enlisted in the First AIF in 1916, Madden was last seen in a newly dug trench with a wound to his right arm or shoulder. He was declared missing in action in May 1917, and following an investigation conducted by a Court of Inquiry into his case, he was declared killed in action on November 26, 1917.	Killed in action	Body never found
1917	Norman Callaway	21	France	Callaway, an Australian first-class cricketer and First Australian Imperial Force soldier, was reported missing in action in the Second Battle of Bullecourt on May 9, 1917. By September 1917, it was confirmed that Callaway had died on the same day.	Killed in action	Body never found
1917	Roger Hay	21–22	Belgium	Hay, a British World War I flying ace credited with five aerial victories, was reported missing in action on July 17, 1917, and it was later reported that he died as a result of wounds while a prisoner of the Germans the same day.	Killed in action	Unknown
1917	William Meggitt	23	Unknown	British flying ace Meggitt was shot down and listed as missing in action on November 8, 1917, but was eventually reported as being a prisoner of the Germans in early 1918. He was repatriated after the Armistice of 11 November 1918.	Found alive	1 year
1918	Kenneth Barbour Montgomery	20	Kingdom of Italy	An English World War I flying ace officially credited with 12 aerial victories, Montgomery was shot down and listed as missing in action on February 22, 1918. His aircraft had been hit by Austro-Hungarian anti-aircraft fire and he had crash-landed in a vineyard in the village of Rustignè, Oderzo, Italy and had been captured, badly wounded. After recovering from his injuries at a military hospital, he was held as a prisoner of war in Vienna until after the armistice that ended the war.	Found alive	9 months
1918	Dudley Gilman Tucker	31	France	Tucker was a military aviator who flew in the Lafayette Flying Corps, and on July 8, 1918, failed to return to base after a routine patrol with four other Spads, during which they encountered 15 German Fokkers in the Soissons and Chateau-Thierry area. He was found with the wreckage of his plane in a field along the Longpont-Chaudun road or on a battlefield at Vierzy - the German records are incomplete. He died of his wounds and after the war his body was identified and buried in an American war cemetery at Seringes-et-Nesle.	Killed in action	Unknown
1918	Francis Lupo	23	France	Lupo was a private in the United States Army who was killed in action near Soissons, France on July 21, 1918. His remains were discovered by French archaeologists in 2003 and buried with full honors at Arlington National Cemetery in September 2006. The location of the grave is section 66, grave number 7489.	Killed in action	85 years
1918	William Otway Boger	23	France	Boger, a Canadian World War I flying ace credited with five aerial victories, was shot down on August 10, 1918, while leading a patrol of three aircraft near Montdidier, France. Initially listed as missing, he was later confirmed to have been killed in action. German ace Josef Veltjens is usually considered the victor over Boger.	Killed in action	Body never found
1918	Friedel Rothe	17	German Empire	Rothe was the first-known victim of German murderer Fritz Haarmann. Rothe encountered Haarmann in a café, having run away from home, and Haarmann had claimed he buried Rothe in a cemetery in Stöckener.	Murdered	Body never found
1918	Cedric Edwards	19	France	British World War I flying ace Edwards was shot down by anti-aircraft fire near Jigsaw Wood, France. Initially reported as "missing", his death was later confirmed, although his body was never recovered.	Killed in action	Body never found
1918	Harold Goodman Shoemaker	26	German Empire	Shoemaker, an American pursuit pilot and World War I flying ace, collided in mid-air with another pilot over enemy territory on October 5, 1918, and was reported missing in action. The International Red Cross later reported that Shoemaker died in a prisoner of war camp in Germany. He was buried in the Somme American Cemetery and Memorial in the village of Bony, France.	Died as a prisoner of war.	Unknown
1919	Mamie Stuart	26	United Kingdom of Great Britain and Ireland	English woman who vanished mysteriously in Caswell Bay, Wales sometime between November and December 1919, only for her body to be found more than four decades later by potholers in the Gower Peninsula. Her bigamist husband, George Everard Shotton, was posthumously convicted of her murder, as he had died in 1958.	Murdered	42 years

== 1920s ==
Date	Person(s)	Age	Country of disappearance	Circumstances	Outcome	Time spent missing or unconfirmed
1920–1929?	Amantul Milorad	Unknown	Yugoslavia	Amantul Milorad, a Serbian banker, disappeared in Zrenjanin, Yugoslavia, having died from poisoning at the hands of Romanian serial killer Vera Renczi. His body was later found locked in a zinc-filled coffin.	Murdered	Unknown
1920	Severin Dobrovolsky	39	Finland	Dobrovolsky was a White Russian political refugee who fled to Vyborg, which was then part of Finland. While living there, he became a prominent figure in anti-Bolshevik, pro-Fascist movements, publishing and writing anti-Soviet propaganda for various magazines in his native Russian. In 1945, he was turned over to the Soviet Union, and subsequently executed the following year.	Found alive	25 years
1921	James Bernard, 4th Earl of Bandon	71	United Kingdom of Great Britain and Ireland	The British representative peer of Ireland during the Irish War of Independence, Lord Bandon was kidnapped by the IRA in retaliation against the British government's policy of torching homes of suspected Irish republicans. During his captivity, Lord Bandon was reportedly treated well, and later released without incident.	Found alive	3 weeks
1922	Eli Lotar	26–27	Kingdom of Romania	Eli Lotar was reported missing in January 1922 and reappeared in December 1922.	Found alive	12 months
1922	Hans Keimes	17	Weimar Republic	Hans Keimes was a 17-year-old youth last seen alive in south Hanover on March 17, 1922. His nude, bound body was found in a canal outside the city on 6 May. Keimes is strongly believed to have been murdered by serial killer Fritz Haarmann, though Keimes' murder remains officially unsolved.	Killed by strangulation	7 weeks
1922	Pauline Picard	2	France	Pauline Picard a French female child disappeared on 6 April 1922 from her family farm and her mutilated and naked corpse was found three weeks later nearby.	Accidental death	3 weeks
1923	Mei Zhanchun	58–59	China	Zhanchun who was a Roman Catholic priest of the Franciscan Order was abducted in 1923 in Hankou, China; he was held for ransom and killed three months later.	Murdered	3 months
1924	Ionel Gherea	38–39	Kingdom of Romania	Ionel Gherea was a Romanian essayist, concert pianist, and philosopher who disappeared for a time from the Kingdom of Roma in 1924. During his disappearance, it was thought that he had committed suicide, until he showed up again.	Found alive	Unknown
1924	George Mallory	37	Tibet (modern-day China)	George Mallory and Andrew Irvine were English mountaineers who after taking part in the first three British expeditions to Mount Everest disappeared during the 1924 British Mount Everest expedition on either June 8 or 9, 1924. On May 1, 1999, Mallory's mummified body was found, 75 years after he had disappeared. In October 2024, Irvine's remains were also found.	Undetermined cause	75 years
1924	Andrew Irvine	22	Tibet (modern-day China)	George Mallory and Andrew Irvine were English mountaineers who after taking part in the first three British expeditions to Mount Everest disappeared during the 1924 British Mount Everest expedition on either June 8 or 9, 1924. On May 1, 1999, Mallory's mummified body was found, 75 years after he had disappeared. In October 2024, Irvine's remains were also found.	Undetermined cause	100 years
1925	Wong Foon Sing	27	Canada	Wong Foon Sing was abducted a year after the murder of Scottish nursemaid Janet Smith, who allegedly committed suicide via an apparently self-inflicted gunshot wound to her left temple. Physical evidence (and the lack thereof) has led to suspicions Wong may have committed her murder. He was abducted and subjected to prolonged torture by (allegedly) Ku Klux Klan members on March 20, 1925, but was released after six weeks.	Found alive / Released	6 weeks
1925	William Floyd Collins	37	United States of America	Floyd was an American cave explorer who became trapped in what became Mammoth Cave National Park on January 30, 1925; he became trapped beneath a 26.5-pound (12.0 kg) rock which fell from the cave ceiling. Although discovered alive the following day, rescuers were unable to reach him. Rescuers eventually reached Collins on February 16, although he had been deceased for approximately three days by the time of his rescue.	Found alive / Died before rescue	1 day
1926	Aimee Semple McPherson	36	United States of America	McPherson was a Canadian Pentecostal evangelist known for pioneering the use of media during church services. In May 1926, she disappeared from Santa Monica, California, causing a media frenzy surrounding her vanishing. Five weeks later, she resurfaced in Mexico, claiming that she had been abducted, a claim never substantiated.	Found alive	5 weeks
1926	Agapit Leblanc	39	Canada	A Canadian Fishery officer from Bouctouche, New Brunswick, who disappeared while investigating illegal fishing activities. He was murdered while on duty on October 20, 1926; his body was discovered four days later.	Murdered	4 days
1926	Mabel Fluke	Unknown	United States of America	Mabel Fluke disappeared from her home in Portland on October 21, 1926, after being murdered by Earle Nelson. Her body was discovered several days later in the attic where she was found to have been strangled with a scarf.	Murdered by strangulation	Several days later
1926	Agatha Christie	36	United Kingdom	Agatha Christie, the British detective-story author, famously disappeared in December 1926, after her husband asked for a divorce. She was located alive 10 days later in a Yorkshire health spa but never proffered a full explanation.	Found alive	10 days
1927	Andrew J. Mathis	61	United States of America	A chicken ranch owner murdered by his live-in housekeeper, Eva Dugan. He was last seen alive on January 27, 1927; his body was discovered in October of the same year.	Murdered	9 months
1928	Frances Smith	18	United States of America	Frances Smith was an American female teenage college student who disappeared on January 13, 1928, from Smith College in Massachusetts and was found dead on March 29, 1929.	undetermined	1 year and 3 months
1928	Walter Collins	9	United States of America	Collins disappeared from his home in Los Angeles, California on March 10, 1928. He was later determined to have been murdered by Gordon Stewart Northcott in what was known as the Wineville Chicken Coop murders. His disappearance and the attempt by the Los Angeles police department to convince his mother that a different boy was her son formed the basis of the 2008 film Changeling.	Murdered	2 years
1929	Viljo Rosvall	Unknown	Canada	Viljo Rosvall and Janne Voutilainen were two Finnish-Canadian trade unionists from Ontario and members of the Lumber Workers Industrial Union of Canada who on November 18, 1929, disappeared mysteriously and were found dead in April 1930.	Murdered	3–4 months
1929	Janne Voutilainen	Unknown	Canada	Viljo Rosvall and Janne Voutilainen were two Finnish-Canadian trade unionists from Ontario and members of the Lumber Workers Industrial Union of Canada who on November 18, 1929, disappeared mysteriously and were found dead in April 1930.	Murdered	3–4 months
1929	Maria Hahn	20	Weimar Republic	A victim of serial killer Peter Kürten. Hahn's body was discovered buried in a cornfield three months after her murder, shortly after he had posted an anonymous letter to authorities divulging the location of her body.	Murdered	Three months

== 1930s ==
Date	Person(s)	Age	Country of disappearance	Circumstances	Outcome	Time spent missing or unconfirmed
1930	Lauri Koskela	23	Finland	Greco-Roman wrestler kidnapped by the fascist Lapua Movement due to his political leanings, but was later released	Found alive	Unknown
1930	Louis J. Carron	27	Australia	Born Leslie John Brown, Carron—a New Zealand native—was a victim of the Murchison Murders. He is believed to have died on or about May 18, 1930; his remains were discovered in Murchison the following year.	Murdered	1 year
1930	Onni Happonen	32	Finland	Happonen was a Finnish politician who was kidnapped and murdered by the fascist Lapua Movement on September 1, 1930. Happonen was later found dead. He had been buried in an anthill on side of the Varkaus in July 1932.	Murdered	Less than 2 years
1930	Robert Elliott Burns	38	United States of America	WWI veteran who escaped from a chain gang in Georgia on several occasions, where he was serving a prison sentence for robbery. He moved to New Jersey, where he survived on odd jobs while writing his memoir, I Am a Fugitive from a Georgia Chain Gang!, which criticized the harshness of the system. His sentence was commuted in 1945, and he was declared a free man.	Found alive	15 years
1930	Adolphus Busch Orthwein	13	United States of America	Orthwein, the son of American business executive Percy Orthwein and heir to the family business, was kidnapped on New Year's Eve in 1930 by realtor Charles Abernathy, who planned to demand a ransom from his family. The next day, on New Year's Day, Abernathy's father, Pearl, managed to return Adolphus back to his family.	Found alive	1 day
1931	Avro Ten Southern Cloud crew	Various	Australia	The aircraft, which flew daily between Sydney and Melbourne, Australia, disappeared under initially unclear circumstances on March 21, 1931. The passengers' and crew's fates remained a mystery until October 26, 1958, when an employee of an irrigation complex accidentally discovered the wreckage in the Snowy Mountains.	Died in plane crash	27 years
1931	John Cuffe	50	United Kingdom	Australian-born English first-class cricketer mostly known for his long tenure for the Worcestershire County Cricket Club, for which he played more than 200 times between 1903 and 1914. On May 9, 1931, he was reported missing, but more than a week later, his body was found floating in Burton upon Trent.	Suicide by drowning	9 days
1931	Vera Page	10	United Kingdom	On December 14, 1931, the 10-year-old student was reported missing after failing to return to her home in Notting Hill, London. Two days later, her body was found on Addison Road, showing signs that she had been raped and manually strangled. While a suspect was arrested in her murder, he was released due to insufficient evidence, and Page's murder remains unsolved.	Murdered	2 days
1932	Charles Augustus Lindbergh Jr.	1	United States of America	On March 1, 1932, Charles Augustus Lindbergh Jr., 20-month-old son of aviator Charles Lindbergh and Anne Morrow Lindbergh, was abducted from the crib in the upper floor of his home in Highfields in East Amwell, New Jersey, United States. On May 12, the child's corpse was discovered by a truck driver by the side of a nearby road.	Murdered	72 days
1933	Charles F. Urschel	43	United States of America	Urschel, a business tycoon, was kidnapped along with fellow oilman Walter R. Jarrett on July 22, 1933, from Oklahoma City by gangsters George "Machine Gun" Kelly and Albert L. Bates. While Jarrett was quickly released, Urschel was held for over a week while his kidnappers demanded a ransom. After his release, the information Urschel managed to provide about his kidnappers' hideout eventually led to their arrests and convictions, despite his having been blindfolded the entire time.	Found alive	1 week
1934	Edward Bremer	34	United States of America	On 17 January 1934, Bremer, a bank president in St. Paul, Minnesota, was kidnapped for ransom by the Barker-Karpis gang., and was released on 7 February.	Released	1 month
1934	Linda Agostini	28	Australia	Linda Agostini, a woman who emigrated from South East London to Australia, disappeared from Melbourne on 27 August 1934. A body, not identified as hers until 1944, was found in a culvert beside a rural road in Albury, New South Wales, Australia, in September 1934.	Manslaughter	10 years
1934	Norma Sedgwick	12	United States of America	The bodies of 12-year-old Norma Sedgwick, 10-year-old Dewilla Noakes, and 8-year-old Cordelia Noakes were found under a blanket in the woods along Pennsylvania Route 233, Centerville Road on November 24, 1934. All three are believed to have been suffocated to death earlier that month by Elmo Noakes, the father of Dewilla and Cordelia and the stepfather of Norma. Noakes also shot and killed his 18-year-old niece, Winifred Peirce, the day after the girls' bodies were discovered.	Murdered	Less than a month
1934	Dewilla Noakes	10	United States of America	The bodies of 12-year-old Norma Sedgwick, 10-year-old Dewilla Noakes, and 8-year-old Cordelia Noakes were found under a blanket in the woods along Pennsylvania Route 233, Centerville Road on November 24, 1934. All three are believed to have been suffocated to death earlier that month by Elmo Noakes, the father of Dewilla and Cordelia and the stepfather of Norma. Noakes also shot and killed his 18-year-old niece, Winifred Peirce, the day after the girls' bodies were discovered.	Murdered	Less than a month
1934	Cordelia Noakes	8	United States of America	The bodies of 12-year-old Norma Sedgwick, 10-year-old Dewilla Noakes, and 8-year-old Cordelia Noakes were found under a blanket in the woods along Pennsylvania Route 233, Centerville Road on November 24, 1934. All three are believed to have been suffocated to death earlier that month by Elmo Noakes, the father of Dewilla and Cordelia and the stepfather of Norma. Noakes also shot and killed his 18-year-old niece, Winifred Peirce, the day after the girls' bodies were discovered.	Murdered	Less than a month
1935	Isabella Ruxton	34	United Kingdom	A Lancaster housewife murdered by her husband in an attack sparked by unproven accusations of her infidelity. Ruxton and the family maid, Mary Rogerson, were extensively mutilated on September 15, 1935; their bodies were discovered in Dumfriesshire town of Moffat on 29 September. Their murderer was executed in 1936.	Murdered	14 days
1935	Mary Jane Rogerson	20	United Kingdom	A Lancaster housewife murdered by her husband in an attack sparked by unproven accusations of her infidelity. Ruxton and the family maid, Mary Rogerson, were extensively mutilated on September 15, 1935; their bodies were discovered in Dumfriesshire town of Moffat on 29 September. Their murderer was executed in 1936.	Murdered	14 days
1936	Katherine E. Hull	22	United States of America	Hull was a 22-year-old stenographer from Syracuse, New York who went for a walk while visiting her grandmother in New Lebanon, New York on April 2, 1936, and never returned. She was last seen hitchhiking. Her remains were found by a hunting party on December 8, 1943, near a wooded area near Hancock, Massachusetts. The cause of death was undetermined, though one author speculates it was a homicide.	Found dead	7 years, 8 months
1937	Mona Tinsley	10	United Kingdom	A schoolgirl who vanished mysteriously while on her way home from school in Newark-on-Trent, England. Her fate remained unclear until six months later, when her body, showing signs of strangulation, was found in the River Idle. A lodger at her parents' house, Frederick Nodder, was later found guilty and hanged for her murder.	Murdered	6 months
1938	James Bailey Cash Jr.	5	United States of America	Five-year-old James Bailey Cash was kidnapped from his Princeton, Florida, home by Franklin Pierce McCall, a former tenant at his family home. He was killed early on by McCall, who over the next week sent ransom letters to the family, demanding money in exchange for the boy's life. On June 5, McCall was brought in for questioning over the case and two days later confessed, indicating where he had buried the boy's body. He was later convicted, sentenced to death, and subsequently executed for the crime.	Murdered	One week
1938	Willie McLean	34	United States of America	A Scottish-born American soccer player, Willie McLean disappeared without a trace in the summer of 1938. His fate was unknown until June 2022, when The Athletic's Pablo Maurer and Matt Pentz uncovered the details behind that disappearance: McLean had suffered a nervous breakdown after multiple head injuries, and he lived out the last 40 years of his life in a series of public mental health facilities.	Died from natural causes	86 years
1938	Margaret Martin	19	United States of America	Margaret Martin was a woman from Kingston, Pennsylvania, who went missing on December 17, 1938, and was found dead in Wyoming County, Pennsylvania, several days later.	Murdered	Several days
1939	Dudley Wolfe	43	British Raj (modern-day Pakistan)	Wolfe was an American socialite who took part in the controversial 1939 American Karakoram expedition to K2, attempting to climb the mountain to impress his ex-wife. He became too weak to carry on climbing at 7,000 ft, and his professional climber associates controversially left him behind in a tent in a failed attempt to reach the summit. A team of Sherpas were sent to rescue him but neither he nor the Sherpas were seen alive again. In 2002, melting snow on the mountain revealed his skeletonised body and indicated that he had died alone either in or near the tent.	Died	63 years
1939	Gerd Johansson	10	Sweden	Swedish schoolgirl who went missing from her home in Stockholm on December 1, 1939. Her body was discovered in Lötsjön showing signs of rape and strangulation. American-Swedish long-distance runner Olle Möller was later convicted of her murder, but the conviction is considered controversial.	Murdered	8 days

== 1940s ==
Date	Person(s)	Age	Country of disappearance	Circumstances	Outcome	Time spent missing or unconfirmed
1940	Les Clisby	25	Scotland	Clisby, an Australian World War II fighter ace who served with the Royal Air Force and was credited with sixteen aerial victories, went into action with his flight against more than thirty Bf 110s over Reims on May 15, 1940. Having destroyed two of the German heavy fighters, Clisby's aircraft was seen going down with its cockpit trailing smoke and flames, evidently hit by cannon fire. He and another officer were posted as missing, until both of their aircraft were recovered in the vicinity of Rethel. Clisby was buried in the military cemetery at Choloy in north-eastern France.	Killed in action	Unknown
1940	Hans Ehlers	26	France	German Luftwaffe military aviator Ehlers was shot down by RAF fighters on May 18, 1940, the same day he claimed his first aerial victories. He was listed as missing, but rejoined his unit shortly afterward.	Found alive	Unknown
1940	Ronald Cartland	33	Belgium	Cartland, a British Conservative Party politician who was the Member of Parliament for King's Norton in Birmingham from 1935 to 1940, was shot and killed on May 30, 1940, near Watou, Belgium while serving in the Battle of Dunkirk. Initially listed as missing, his family learned of his fate in January 1941, when his mother received a letter from one of Cartland's men, describing Cartland's death in detail. He is now buried at Hotton War Cemetery, in Hotton, Belgium.	Killed in action	8 months
1940	Franciszek Gruszka	30	United Kingdom	Polish soldier and flying officer for the RAF who mysteriously vanished during the Battle of Britain. Initially listed as missing in action, his remains were located in 1975, when a team of scientists examining marshes in the English countryside stumbled upon the plane's wreckage and his remains.	Killed in action	35 years
1940	Eric Charles Twelves Wilson	28	Somaliland Protectorate (modern-day Somaliland)	British Army officer and colonial administrator who was captured by Italian forces during the invasion of British Somaliland. Presumed killed in action, he was released after the Italians surrendered the following year.	Found alive	Several months
1940	Nicolae Iorga	69	Kingdom of Romania	Romanian politician kidnapped on November 27, 1940, and later murdered by a squadron of the Iron Guard, a radical fascist organization operating in the country.	Murdered	1 day
1941	Six Hernández children	Various	Mexico	Six Mexican children from Mexico City were not seen from 1941 to 1959 as they were confined to their house by their father Rafael Pérez Hernández. They were finally freed from the situation when the police showed up to investigate the case.	Found alive	18 years
1941	Vladimir Chebotaryov	20	Soviet Union (modern-day Ukraine)	Soviet commanding officer stationed in Kiev, who was declared missing in action after the territory was occupied by Nazi forces. Chebotaryov made multiple successful escapes from various prison camps, with his final one resulting in him being picked up by Soviet intelligence officers who dispatched him to a SMERSH unit. After the war, he started a successful career as a film director and writer.	Found alive	4 years
1941	Raymond Donoghue	21	Unknown	An Australian infantryman, Donoghue was captured by the Germans on April 28, 1941, and reported as a POW in August. After his release in 1945, he recounted his experiences to the media, and was later awarded the George Cross for his conduct during the war.	Found alive	2–3 months
1941	Fyodor Truhin	45	Soviet Union (modern-day Latvia)	Soviet major general who was declared missing in action after being arrested by German forces on June 30, 1941. His fate was uncovered years later, when it was revealed that he had defected to Nazi Germany. Shortly thereafter, he was arrested, convicted of treason and executed.	Found alive	4 years
1941	Clive Barry	16	Unknown	At the time of his disappearance, Clive Barry was an underage youth who had falsified his date of birth so he could enlist in the Australian army. While serving in the European front, he went missing, but it was later revealed that he had been held as a POW in Italy. Two years after his capture, he managed to escape into Switzerland, and then returned to Australia, where he became a famous novelist.	Found alive	2 years
1941	Jim McCairns	21	France	McCairns, an English RAF pilot, was posted as missing in action after failing to return from a fast combat with Messerschmitt Bf 109 fighters over the French coast on July 6, 1941. His aircraft was positively identified by its squadron code letters painted on the fuselage when sighted by another member of the squadron on July 8, 1941, crash-landed near the beach at Gravelines-Dunkirk. He had been captured by German soldiers, and his status was "prisoner of war, slightly wounded".	Found alive	2 days
1941	Konstantin Rakutin	39	Soviet Union	A major general of the Red Army, Rakutin led the Yelnya offensive during Operation Barbarossa. On October 7, 1941, he never returned from the frontlines, and was declared dead in 1946. His place of death was discovered by members of the Search Movement and in 1996 his remains were reburied at the military cemetery in Snegiri. He was awarded the title Hero of the Soviet Union in 1990.	Killed in action	55 years
1942	Bill Aldag	37	Dutch East Indies (modern-day Indonesia)	Aldag, an Australian rules footballer who enlisted in the 2nd AIF in 1940, was declared missing in 1942, but later found in a POW camp in Thailand, where he worked on the infamous Burma Railway in appalling conditions. In 1945 Aldag returned home.	Found alive	Unknown
1942	Ern Parker	19–20	British Malaya (modern-day Singapore)	Parker, an Australian rules footballer who enlisted in the Australian Army in July 1941, was declared missing after the fall of Singapore. During his incarceration Parker worked on the Burma Railway and he survived to return to Australia in late 1945.	Found alive	3 years
1942	Hamilton Lamb	42	Dutch East Indies (modern-day Indonesia)	Lamb was an Australian politician who was a member of the Victorian Legislative Assembly from 1935 to 1943, representing the electorate of Lowan for the Country Party. While serving in the 2/2nd Pioneer Battalion of the Second Australian Imperial Force, he was captured as a prisoner of war and sent to work on the Burma Railway in Thailand. He died on December 7, 1943, at the Japanese work camp 131 Kilo in Thailand, suffering from malaria, dysentery and malnutrition. Official notification of his death was not received in Australia until nearly nine months later on September 1, 1944.	Died as a prisoner of war	About 2 years and 9 months
1942	Harold Ball	21	British Malaya (modern-day Singapore)	Harold Ball was an Australian rules football player who on February 9, 1942 was captured by Japanese soldiers near Tengah Air Base, Tengah, British Malaya. He was found dead on May 9, 1942, after being murdered.	Murdered	3 months
1942	Peter Chitty	30	British Malaya (modern-day Singapore)	Chitty, an Australian rules footballer, was captured during the Fall of Singapore in March 1942 and reported missing on March 26, 1942. While in captivity in the Changi Prison, he won the only "Changi Brownlow" awarded in the Prisoner of War Changi Football League. In 1943, he was transferred to Burma where he spent eighteen months working on the Burma Railway. He was released at the end of World War II.	Found alive	3 years
1942	Fyodor Kostenko	46	Soviet Union (modern-day Ukraine)	A commander of the Southwestern Front during World War II. Kostenko is believed to have died in the Second Battle of Kharkov on May 26, 1942. His body was recovered in the spring of 2016 and later repatriated to Russia.	Killed in action	74 years
1942	Maurice Fitzgerald	25	Belgium	Fitzgerald was an Australian rugby league footballer who died while serving in the Royal Australian Air Force in World War II. On June 1, 1942, he was on board a Vickers Wellington which was shot down over Hainaut, German-occupied Belgium, and crashed near Binche. Fitzgerald was originally cited as missing in action, but was declared presumed dead on December 26, 1942. The crew's remains were eventually found, and all were buried at Charleroi Communal Cemetery.	Killed in action	Unknown
1942	Peter Turnbull	25	Territory of New Guinea, Australia (modern-day Papua New Guinea)	Turnbull was an Australian fighter ace of World War II credited with twelve aerial victories. On August 27, 1942, he was patrolling for Japanese tanks with another member of his squadron when his plane was seen flipping onto its back and crashing into the jungle while diving on an enemy target. The cause of the incident was never fully established. Initially posted as missing, Turnbull was confirmed dead on 4 September when troops from the 2/12th Battalion found the wreckage of his plane and his body inside. He is buried in the Bomana War Cemetery, Port Moresby.	Killed in action	8 days
1942	Joan Pearl Wolfe	19	United Kingdom	19-year-old Joan Pearl Wolfe disappeared in Surrey, England on September 14, 1942. Her remains were unearthed by two Royal Marines on October 7, 1942; an autopsy conducted the next day concluded that Wolfe died of a single blow to the back of the head. August Sangret, a 28-year-old French-Canadian soldier with whom Wolfe was romantically involved, was arrested and charged with her murder. Sangret was found guilty and sentenced to execution by hanging; he was hanged on April 29, 1943, at the age of 29. The recovered fragments of Wolfe's skull were introduced as evidence at Sangret's trial.	Murdered	23 days
1942	Dermot Chichester, 7th Marquess of Donegall	26	Italian Libya (modern-day Libya)	Dermot Chichester was a British soldier, landowner and member of the House of Lords whose father was Arthur Chichester, 4th Baron Templemore. He served in the Second World War as a captain with the 7th Queen's Own Hussars in Egypt. He was reported missing in action and believed to have been killed, but had been captured in Libya in November 1942 during the North African campaign. He remained a prisoner of war in Italy until escaping in June 1944.	Found alive	1 year and 7 months
1942	Boyd Wagner	26	United States of America	American USAAF aviator and fighter ace who disappeared in Florida under unclear circumstances. Partial remains and his plane's wreckage were found in January 1943, and he was reburied in Johnstown.	Died in a plane crash	2 months
1943	Juran Hisao	40–41	South Pacific	Hisao was an author who was drafted into the Imperial Japanese Navy in 1943. He was reported missing in action over the South Pacific in 1943, but returned safely to Chōshi, Chiba, the following year.	Found alive	Approx. 1 year
1943	Hans Eller	32	Soviet Union	Hans Eller was a German Olympic rower who was active in World War II. After being sent to Russia he disappeared on January 23, 1943, and it was later discovered that he had died on April 4, 1943, near Starobelsk in a camp.	Died as a prisoner of war	Body never found
1943	Gerry Chalk	32	France	Chalk, an English amateur cricketer, was shot down over Louches in northern France on February 17, 1943, whilst serving as a Spitfire pilot in the Royal Air Force. He was listed as missing in action and was presumed dead in January 1944. His body was identified in the 1980s and his remains transferred to the Terlincthun British Cemetery near Wimille in 1989, having originally been listed on the Runnymede Memorial.	Killed in action	At least 38 years
1943	Robert S. Johnson	23	Belgium	Johnson, a USAAF fighter pilot, encountered Luftwaffe aircraft for the first time on a May 14, 1943 mission to escort Boeing B-17 Flying Fortresses to bomb Antwerp, damaging two Focke-Wulf Fw 190s that had broken up his squadron's formation. He became separated from the group and, finding himself alone, broke off the engagement. He returned to base to find that he had been erroneously reported as missing in action.	Found alive	Less than a day
1943	Art Grant	24	Nazi Germany	Art Grant was a Canadian professional ice hockey player and a pilot officer in the Royal Canadian Air Force, who was listed as presumed dead with two other crew when their aircraft, containing seven crew in total, was shot down south of Rheinberg, Nazi Germany. The remaining 4 crew members became prisoners of war, and the 3 dead crew, including Grant, had been buried at Monchengladbach after the crash, but were disinterred in 1949 and reburied at Rheinberg War Cemetery.	Killed in action	6 years
1943	John L. Jerstad	25	Kingdom of Romania	Jerstad was a posthumous recipient of the Medal of Honor for his actions during Operation Tidal Wave on August 1, 1943, during which he volunteered to lead a formation. Three miles from the target, the largest of the oil refineries at Ploieşti, Jerstad's bomber was badly damaged and set aflame by enemy ground fire. It crashed into the target area after bombs were released on the target, and Jerstad was listed as missing in action. His remains were located seven years later, and buried at the Ardennes American Cemetery near Neupré, Belgium.	Killed in action	7 years
1943	Charles Peter O'Sullivan	28	Territory of New Guinea, Australia (modern-day Papua New Guinea)	O'Sullivan, a veteran fighter pilot during World War II, was shot down south of Wewak on September 20, 1943. He managed to avoid being captured by the enemy and returned after being missing for one month.	Found alive	30 days
1943	Julie Muschler	Unknown	Nazi Germany	In December 1943, Julie Muschler, the lab assistant and housekeeper of Sigmund Rascher disappeared while on a mountain trip and her body was found in April 1944.	Died (undetermined cause)	5 months
1944	John Verdun Newton	27	Nazi Germany	Newton was an Australian politician and Royal Australian Air Force officer who was killed in action 55 days after being elected to the Parliament of Western Australia for the seat of Greenough at the 1943 state election. He went missing with seven other crew during an air raid on January 14, 1944, and it was later established by RAF investigations that their plane had crashed into another, and afterward the wreckage of both bombers had been subjected to massive explosions and/or intense fires. The crew were initially buried in the crater caused by the explosion, but late reinterred in the Hanover War Cemetery.	Killed in action	Unknown
1944	Floyd K. Lindstrom	31	Kingdom of Italy	Lindstrom, a United States Army soldier who was posthumously awarded the Medal of Honor for his actions on November 11, 1943, landed at an Anzio beachhead with his unit on January 22, 1944, and on February 3, killed in a German counterattack. Initially listed as missing in action, his status was changed to killed in action on June 6. First buried at Nettuno, Italy, he was returned to his family in Colorado Springs in July 1948, where he is buried next to his mother in Evergreen Cemetery.	Killed in action	Unknown
1944	Percy Charles Pickard	28	France	Pickard, an RAF officer during World War II, led a group of Mosquitos on the Amiens prison raid to destroy the walls of a Gestapo prison and free the prisoners inside, during which he and Flight Lieutenant Alan Broadley were killed. Both initially reported missing, in September 1944 it was announced they had been killed in action. Both men were buried at the St Pierre Cemetery near Amiens, France. Pickard is buried in plot 3, row B, grave 13 while Broadley is buried in plot 3, row A, grave 11.	Killed in action	7 years
1944	Elmer Gedeon	27	France	Gedeon was an American professional baseball player who was one of the only two Major League Baseball players killed in World War II, the other being Harry O'Neill. On April 20, 1944, he was shot down while piloting a B-26 bomber on a mission led by Darrell R. Lindsey. He was listed as missing in action until May 1945, when his grave was located in a small British Army cemetery in France. His remains were later returned to the United States and interred in Arlington National Cemetery.	Killed in action	1 year
1944	John Balmer	33	Belgium	Balmer, a senior officer and bomber pilot in the Royal Australian Air Force who was awarded the Distinguished Flying Cross in April 1944, failed to return from a mission over Belgium on the night of 11/12 May. Initially posted as missing, his plane was later confirmed to have been shot down, and all of the crew killed. Balmer was buried outside Brussels.	Killed in action	Unknown
1944	Ray Watts	26	Belgium	Watts, an Australian rules footballer who served as a warrant officer and was awarded the Distinguished Flying Cross in 1943, was shot down by enemy fire on May 31, 1944. He managed to hide in a Belgian pine forest for six weeks until he was captured. He spent more than a year as a German prisoner of war at Stalag Luft III.	Found alive	About 1 year
1944	Păstorel Teodoreanu	49–50	Romania	A notable Romanian humorist, poet, gastronome and World War II propagandist. Teodoreanu disappeared for a period of time during the Allied bombing raids of Bucharest, but later resurfaced, having taken refuge in Budești throughout the campaign. He later returned to regular journalism.	Found alive	c. 2 months
1944	Shoichi Yokoi	29	Guam	Shoichi Yokoi was a sergeant in the Imperial Japanese Army during the Second World War who was one of the last three Japanese holdouts to be found after the end of hostilities in 1945. He disappeared in July 1944 during the Second Battle of Guam, and on the evening of January 24, 1972, he was discovered alive in the jungle.	Found alive	28 years
1944	Hiroo Onoda	22	Second Philippine Republic	Hiroo Onoda was an Imperial Japanese Army intelligence officer who fought in World War II and was a Japanese holdout. He entered a jungle on Lubang Island in Occidental Mindoro, Philippines to continue fighting after the US invaded the island. He surrendered on March 11, 1974, after 29 years of guerrilla warfare.	Found alive	29 years
1944	Miklós Horthy Jr.	37	Kingdom of Hungary	Politician and son of Miklós Horthy, who was abducted by German agents on the orders of Otto Skorzeny. He was held under house arrest and then in concentration camps until he was rescued by the United States Army North on May 5, 1945.	Found alive	7 months
1944	Bernard Gavrin	29	South Seas Mandate, Japan (modern-day Saipan)	American army private who went missing during the Battle of Saipan sometime between June 15 and July 9, 1944. His fate remained unclear until his remains were recovered by a Japanese non-profit group searching for remains of Japanese soldiers. He was positively identified via DNA testing, but his exact cause of death was not determined.	Presumed killed in action	70 years
1944	William T. Carneal	24	South Seas Mandate, Japan (modern-day Saipan)	An American serviceman killed fighting the Japanese on the island of Saipan. Initially declared missing in action, his remains were discovered by a Japanese nonprofit organization searching for the remains of fallen Japanese soldiers in 2013. His remains were identified via DNA testing in December 2013.	Killed in action	69 years
1944	Rulon Jay Borgstrom	19	France	Rulon Jay Borgstrom was the brother of LeRoy, Clyde, and Rolon Day Borgstrom, all of whom served and died in World War II. Rulon Jay served with the 38th Infantry Regiment, 2nd Infantry Division, when he was reported missing in an attack on Le Dreff, near Brest, France, in August 1944. He was found and died 18 days later on August 25, 1944, from wounds received in action.	Killed in action	18 days
1944	Helmut Bergmann	24	France	Bergmann, a German Luftwaffe military aviator, night fighter ace, and recipient of the Knight's Cross of the Iron Cross, was shot down and killed together with two crew members at Mortain on the Cotentin Peninsula on 6 August 1944. His remains were later found and temporarily buried, and later re-interred at the Marigny German war cemetery.	Killed in action	Unknown
1944	Eugeniusz Horbaczewski	26	France	Polish fighter pilot and flying ace Horbaczewski led his 12-aircraft squadron over France on a 'Rodeo' mission. They attacked a group of 60 Fw 190s of Jagdgeschwaders 2 and 26 over an airfield near Beauvais. Horbaczewski quickly shot down three Focke-Wulfs, but went missing during the dogfight. In 1947, his plane's wreckage and body was found crashed near Velennes.	Killed in action	3 years
1944	Pyotr Z. Bazhbeuk-Melikov	72	Soviet Union	An ethnic Armenian politician who later joined the Odessa-based Committee for the Salvation of Bessarabia. Bazhbeuk-Melikov later fled the region during the later stages of the Russian Civil War and returned to Bessarabia; he fled the region following the Soviet occupation of 1940 and settled in Ploiești, where he died in 1944.	Died from natural causes	4 years
1944	George Varoff	30	Republic of China	Varoff, an American pole vaulter, was shot down on December 7, 1944, while doing his military service in China. He and his crew managed to safely bail out, and eventually managed to safely reach their base.	Found alive	6 weeks
1944	Lawrence Dickson	24	Nazi Germany (modern-day Austria)	Dickson, an American pilot and member of the Tuskegee Airmen who flew in 68 missions during World War II, went missing while flying over Austria. His remains were identified by the Defense POW/MIA Accounting Agency in 2018.	Killed in action	74 years
1944	Heinrich Bartels	26	Nazi Germany	Heinrich Bartels was an Austrian-born German fighter pilot during World War II who was posted as missing in action on December 23, 1944, after being shot down. Twenty-three years later, Bartels' fighter and his remains were found near Bad Godesberg, Germany, on January 26, 1968.	Killed in action	23 years
1945	Carl Shaeffer	20	Belgium	Shaeffer was taken prisoner of war by German forces in Belgium on January 18, 1945. Initially reported missing in action, he was later found to be a prisoner and was released at the end of the war. After he returned home, he began playing basketball at the University of Alabama and later became Alabama's first-ever professional basketball player.	Found alive	7 months
1945	Al Blozis	26	France	Blozis was an American football offensive tackle and track and field athlete who persuaded the United States Army to waive its size limit and accept him in. On January 31, 1945, his platoon was in the Vosges Mountains of France scouting enemy lines. When two of his men, a sergeant and a private, failed to return from a patrol, he went in search of them alone, but never returned. His death was confirmed in April 1945, and his remains buried at the Lorraine American Cemetery and Memorial in Saint-Avold, Moselle.	Killed in action	3 months
1945	Keith Thiele	23	Nazi Germany	Thiele was a Royal New Zealand Air Force officer who was one of only four New Zealand born airmen to receive two medal Bars to his Distinguished Flying Cross. While leading a formation of eight Tempests to attack locomotives in the Paderborn-Rheine area on February 10, 1945, Thiele and another pilot were shot down by enemy anti-aircraft fire, with Thiele bailing out and being reported as missing in action. Slightly wounded, Thiele was taken captive by the flak crew that had shot him down and was sent to a prisoner of war camp at Dulag Luft near Wetzlar. The camp was liberated on March 31, 1945, before any transport or Allied forces arrived, so Thiele and a Canadian airman stole bicycles and then a motorcycle. Thiele got back to his base five weeks before the war ended in Europe.	Found alive	About 1 month
1945	Spencer Walklate	27	Territory of New Guinea, Australia (modern-day Papua New Guinea)	Australian rugby footballer who later enlisted as a special operations serviceman in the Australian Army. After being sent to Japanese-occupied Papua New Guinea, Walklate was likely captured in mid-April, tortured and executed. His remains were recovered on Kairiru Island in 2013, and promptly reburied at a local war cemetery.	Killed in action	68 years
1945	Walter Botsch	48	Nazi Germany	Botsch, a German general who commanded the 19th Army and received the Knight's Cross of the Iron Cross on May 9, 1945, was considered missing in action on April 16, 1945, but later turned up alive.	Found alive	Unknown
1945	Gerhart Drabsch	42	Nazi Germany	Drabsch, a German writer whose work was part of the literature event in the art competition at the 1928 Summer Olympics, was listed at missing in action on April 9, 1945, while serving in the Volkssturm during the final days of World War II. His remains were later found and interred at Luckenwalde war cemetery.	Killed in action	Unknown
1945	Simon Eden	20–21	Burma	Simon Eden, son of Anthony Eden and Beatrice Beckett, was killed in action with the Royal Air Force in Burma in 1945. His plane was reported "missing in action" on June 23 and found on July 16; Anthony Eden did not want the news to be public until after the election result on July 26, to avoid claims of "making political capital" from it.	Killed in action	3 weeks
1945	Genrikh Lyushkov	45	Manchukuo (modern-day China)	Lyushkov was a high-level Soviet defector and former Far East NKVD chief. A participant in the Great Purge, he fled to avoid what he believed would be arrest and execution into the Japanese puppet state of Manchukuo. After his defection, he became a military consultant and analyst for the Imperial Japanese Army. He disappeared during the Soviet invasion of Manchuria and was reported as being last seen in a crowded train station in Dairen (Dalian) in August 1945. His fate remained unknown for 34 years until 1979, when Yutaka Takeoka, an intelligence officer and Lyushkov's handler, publicly admitted that he executed Lyushkov on the evening of August 19, 1945 in order to prevent him from falling back into Soviet hands.	Executed	Body never found
1945	Teruo Nakamura	26	Dutch East Indies (modern-day Indonesia)	Nakamura was a Taiwanese-Japanese soldier of the Imperial Japanese Army. He was stationed in Morotai Island in Indonesia shortly before the island was overrun by the Allies in September 1944. Declared legally dead in September 1945, he was discovered alive in 1974, and formally surrendered that year. Nakamura was the last known Japanese holdout to surrender after the end of hostilities.	Found alive	29 years
1945	Thora Chamberlain	14	United States of America	Chamberlain was a teenage female high school student from California who had disappeared and was later reported missing on November 2, 1945. It was later revealed that she had been murdered although her body was never recovered.	Murdered	Body never found
1946	Muriel Drinkwater	12	Wales	Muriel Drinkwater was a Welsh female child who disappeared on June 27, 1946. She left her house to go to the store to buy food for her family and was found dead in a Penllergaer, Swansea nearby woods the next the day after being murdered.	Murdered	1 day
c.1947	David Bousquet	c. 7	Canada	The bodies of two brothers, David and Derek Bousquet, were found concealed in woodland at Stanley Park in Vancouver, British Columbia, Canada on January 14, 1953. The Bousquets are believed to have been murdered with a hatchet around the year 1947. A DNA test conducted in 1998 confirmed that the victims were brothers between the ages of six and ten. With the help of forensic genealogy, the Vancouver Police Department publicly identified the Bousquets on November 15, 2022.	Murdered	69 years
c.1947	Derek Bousquet	c. 6	Canada	The bodies of two brothers, David and Derek Bousquet, were found concealed in woodland at Stanley Park in Vancouver, British Columbia, Canada on January 14, 1953. The Bousquets are believed to have been murdered with a hatchet around the year 1947. A DNA test conducted in 1998 confirmed that the victims were brothers between the ages of six and ten. With the help of forensic genealogy, the Vancouver Police Department publicly identified the Bousquets on November 15, 2022.	Murdered	69 years
1947	Daniel S. Voorhees	33–34	United States of America	American man who confessed to murder of Elizabeth Short on January 28, 1947, disappeared shortly after that, then later reappeared. He died on July 28, 1953, from lung cancer.	Found alive	Unknown
1947	Lai Teck	45–46	Thailand	Lai Teck, a leader of the Communist Party of Malaya and Malayan People's Anti-Japanese Army, disappeared in 1947. According to the newly elected party leader Chin Peng, he personally went to Bangkok and Hong Kong and contacted the communist party organizations there, asking them to help track down and kill Lai Teck; both the Vietnamese and Thai communists assisted Chin Peng in the manhunt. Eventually, Chin Peng was told by the Thai Communist leader that Lai Teck was accidentally suffocated while three Thai Communists tried to capture him. His body was then put into a gunny sack and tossed into the Menam River.	Killed in struggle	Body never found
August 2nd, 1947	Crew and Passengers of BSAA Star Dust	Various	Argentina	On August 2nd, 1947, the British South American Airways aircraft Stardust crashed into the Argentinian side of the Andes mountains, killing all aboard. Famously, the aircraft's final transmission was "STENDEC" in morse code, which has puzzled people since the crash. In 1998, two mountaineers were able to locate parts of the wreckage and in 2000 the Argentine Army was able to locate and recover a majority of the wreckage, including some of the bodies.	Died (plane crash)	41 years
1948	Riva Kwas	32	France	Riva Kwas, a 32-year-old Polish woman working as a chemist in Paris, was murdered in her studio-apartment in the Auteuil district on the night of February 22, 1948. Although Kwas' body was discovered five days later, her murder remained unsolved for more than five years, until serial killer John Balaban confessed to Kwas' murder after being detained and charged for murders committed in Australia.	Murdered	5 days
1948	Placido Rizzotto	34	Italy	Rizzotto was a partisan, socialist peasant and trade union leader from Corleone, who was assassinated by Sicilian Mafia boss Luciano Leggio on March 10, 1948. Over 60 years after his death, remains were found on July 7, 2009, on a cliff in Rocca Busambra near Corleone, and on March 9, 2012, a DNA test, compared with one extracted from his father Carmelo Rizzotto, long dead and exhumed for this purpose, confirmed the identity of remains as being that of Placido Rizzotto following a long and difficult investigation conducted by the State Police at the service of the PS Commissariat of Corleone.	Murdered	61 years
1948	Sally Horner	11	United States of America	Sally Horner was kidnapped by Frank La Salle in New Jersey and held captive for 21 months.	Rescued	21 months
1948	Irwin Foster Hilliard	85	Canada	Irwin Foster Hilliard was an Ontario lawyer and political figure. He went missing after leaving his home on a shopping trip on November 23, 1948, and while initially believed to have drowned, his body was found near Lambton on December 22.	Died (undetermined cause)	29 days
1949	Olive Durand-Deacon	69	United Kingdom	69-year-old Olive Durand-Deacon, the wealthy widow of solicitor John Durand-Deacon and a resident at the Onslow Court Hotel, was invited to a workshop on Leopold Road by English serial killer John Haigh—who introduced himself to Durand-Deacon as an engineer—on February 18, 1949. Once Durand-Deacon was inside, she was shot in the back of the neck, stripped of her valuables, and placed into a vat of sulphuric acid. Two days later, Durand-Deacon was reported missing by a friend. Police searched the workshop and found items belonging to Durand-Deacon as well as previous victims of Haigh. Some of Durand-Deacon's remains were discovered behind the workshop. Haigh was arrested and charged with Durand-Deacon's murder, as well as the murders of five others. Haigh pled insanity, though was convicted and sentenced to death; he was hanged on August 10, 1949.	Murdered	At least 2 days
1949	Eva Neander	28	Sweden	Neander was a female Swedish journalist and author from the 1940s, who disappeared on February 22, 1949, and was found dead, frozen in ice in Lake Unden in Tiveden exactly one year later.	Died from drowning	1 year
1949	Sadanori Shimoyama	47	Japan	Shimoyama was the first president of the newly formed Japanese National Railways who was last seen at the Mitsukoshi department store in Nihonbashi, Tokyo on July 5, 1949. While his dismembered body was found on the Jōban Line the following day after having been run over by an outbound freight train, the circumstances of his disappearance and death still remains a mystery.	Died in train accident	1 day
1949	Thelma Taylor	15	United States	Thelma Taylor was an American teenage female who disappeared on August 6, 1949, in Portland, Oregon and was found dead five days later after being murdered.	Murdered	5 days

== See also ==
- List of kidnappings
- List of murder convictions without a body
- List of people who disappeared mysteriously: pre-1910
- List of people who disappeared mysteriously: 1910–1990
- List of people who disappeared mysteriously: 1990–present
- List of unsolved deaths
- Lists of unsolved murders
- List of solved missing person cases: post-2000

== Bibliography ==
- Dvorchak, Robert J. and Holewa, Lisa (1992). Milwaukee Massacre: Jeffrey Dahmer and the Milwaukee Murders. New York City: Dell Publishing. ISBN 978-0-7090-5003-2.
- Keppel, Robert (2005). The Riverman: Ted Bundy and I Hunt for the Green River Killer (Paperback ed.). New York City: Pocket Books. ISBN 978-0-7434-6395-9.
- Keppel, Robert (2010). The Riverman: Ted Bundy and I Hunt for the Green River Killer (Kindle ed.). New York City: Simon & Schuster. ISBN 978-1-4391-9434-8.
- Masters, Brian (1993). The Shrine of Jeffrey Dahmer. London, England: Hodder & Stoughton. ISBN 978-0-340-59194-9.
- Michaud, Stephen & Aynesworth, Hugh (1983). The Only Living Witness: The True Story of Serial Sex Killer Ted Bundy. New York City: Linden Press / Simon & Schuster. ISBN 978-0-671-44961-2.
- Michaud, Stephen & Aynesworth, Hugh (August 1999) [1983]. The Only Living Witness: The True Story of Serial Sex Killer Ted Bundy (Paperback; revised ed.). Irving, Texas: Authorlink. ISBN 978-1-928704-11-9.
- Newton, Michael (2006). The Encyclopedia of Serial Killers. New York: Facts on File. ISBN 978-0-8160-6987-3. OCLC 57641508.
- Norris, Joel (1992). Jeffrey Dahmer. London, England: Constable & Robinson. ISBN 978-0-09-472060-2.
- Roy, Jody M. (2002). Love to Hate: America's Obsession with Hatred and Violence. New York City: Columbia University Press. ISBN 978-0-231-12569-7.
- Rule, Ann (1989). The Stranger Beside Me (Paperback; revised and updated ed.). New York City: Signet Books. ISBN 978-0-451-16493-3.
- Rule, Ann (2000). The Stranger Beside Me (Paperback; updated 20th anniversary ed.). New York: Signet Books. ISBN 978-0-451-20326-7.
- Rule, Ann (2009). The Stranger Beside Me (Paperback; updated 2009 ed.). New York City: Pocket Books. ISBN 978-1-4165-5959-7.
- Schechter, Harold (1998). Bestial: The Savage Trail of a True American Monster. New York: Pocket Books. ISBN 978-0-7434-8335-3. OCLC 55063725.
- Sullivan, Kevin M. (2009). The Bundy Murders: A Comprehensive History (Paperback ed.). Jefferson, North Carolina: McFarland and Co. ISBN 978-0-7864-4426-7.
