= A Hundred Miles or More: A Collection =

Compilation album by Alison Krauss
- Released: April 3, 2007
- Genre: Country, bluegrass
- Length: 67:30
- Label: Rounder
- Producer: Alison Krauss

Alison Krauss chronology
Lonely Runs Both Ways (2004)	A Hundred Miles or More: A Collection (2007)	Raising Sand (2007)

Professional ratings
Review scores
Source	Rating
AllMusic	link

A Hundred Miles or More: A Collection is a compilation album by country/bluegrass artist Alison Krauss. It was released on April 3, 2007, and is a collection of new and old songs that Krauss has recorded. It features duets with Sting, Brad Paisley, John Waite, and James Taylor. The album debuted and peaked at No. 10 on the U.S. Billboard 200, No. 3 on the U.S. Top Country Albums, and No. 38 on the UK Albums Chart.

Two singles were released from the album: a cover version of "Missing You" by John Waite, which reached No. 34 on the Hot Country Songs chart, and "Simple Love", which did not chart. One of the previously released tracks, How's The World Treating You, a duet with James Taylor, had won the Best Country Collaboration with Vocals at the 46th Grammy Awards.

== Track listing ==
1. "You're Just a Country Boy" (Fred Hellerman, Marshall Barer)
  - previously unreleased
2. "Simple Love" (Sarah Siskind)
  - previously unreleased
3. "Jacob's Dream" (Julie Lee, John Pennell)
  - the story of the Lost Children of the Alleghenies
  - previously unreleased
4. "Away Down the River" (Julie Lee)
  - previously unreleased
5. "Sawing on the Strings" (Lewis Compton)
  - previously unreleased
6. "Down to the River to Pray" (Traditional)
  - from O Brother, Where Art Thou soundtrack
7. "Baby Mine" (Ned Washington, Frank Churchill)
  - from The Best of Country Sing the Best of Disney
8. "Molly Bán (Bawn)" (Paddy Moloney)
  - featuring The Chieftains
  - from The Chieftains' Down the Old Plank Road: The Nashville Sessions
9. "How's the World Treating You" (Chet Atkins, Boudleaux Bryant)
  - featuring James Taylor
  - from Livin', Lovin', Losin': Songs of The Louvin Brothers
10. "The Scarlet Tide" (Elvis Costello, T Bone Burnett)
  - from Cold Mountain soundtrack
11. "Whiskey Lullaby" (Bill Anderson, Jon Randall)
  - featuring Brad Paisley
  - from Brad Paisley's "Mud on the Tires"
12. "You Will Be My Ain True Love" (Sting)
  - featuring Sting
  - from Cold Mountain soundtrack
13. "I Give You to His Heart" (Ron Block)
  - from The Prince of Egypt: Nashville
14. "Get Me Through December" (Gordie Sampson, Fred Lavery)
  - featuring Natalie MacMaster
  - From Natalie MacMaster's In My Hands
15. "Missing You" (John Waite, Mark Leonard, Charles Sanford)
  - featuring John Waite
  - From John Waite's Downtown: Journey of a Heart
16. "Lay Down Beside Me" (Don Williams)
  - featuring John Waite
  - previously unreleased

== Personnel ==
- Alison Krauss – vocals, backing vocals, fiddle, producer
- Guitar – B. James Lowry, Bill Piburn, Brad Paisley, Carl Jackson, Dan Tyminski, Gordie Sampson, Jerry Douglas, Mike Johnson, Michael Spriggs, Ron Block, Stuart Duncan, Tom Bukovac, Tony Rice
- Bass guitar, double bass – Barry Bales, Abraham Laboriel, Dennis Crouch, Viktor Krauss, Kevin Grantt
- Keyboards – Catherine Marx, Gordon Mote, Jim Cox, Keefus Ciancia, Matt Rollings, Scott Baggett
- Drums, percussion – Larry Atamanuik, Abraham Laboriel, Andy Peake, Ben Sesar, Eric Darken, Harry Stinson, Greg Morrow, Tony Creasman, Kenny Malone, Shannon Forrest
- Vocals, backing vocals – Brad Paisley, Cheryl White, Dub Cornett, Dan Tyminski, David Rawlings, Gillian Welch, James Taylor, John Waite, Maura O'Connell, Norman Blake, Pat Enright, Porter McLister, Ron Block, Sam Bush, Sam Phillips, Sting, Tim O'Brien
- Banjo – Béla Fleck
- Dulcimer – David Schnaufer, Steve Buckingham
- Mandolin – Dan Tyminski, Sam Bush, Stuart Duncan, Bryan Sutton
- Mandola – Adam Steffey
- Cello – Martin Tillman, Chris Carmichael
- Fiddle – Natalie MacMaster, Justin Williamson
- Guitar - Jeff White

== Chart performance ==
=== Weekly charts ===
Chart (2007)	Peak position
Dutch Albums (Album Top 100)	91
Irish Albums (IRMA)	66
Norwegian Albums (VG-lista)	7
Scottish Albums (Official Charts)	29
UK Albums (Official Charts)	38
US Billboard 200	10
US Top Country Albums (Billboard)	3

=== Year-end charts ===
Chart (2007)	Position
US Billboard 200	112
US Top Country Albums (Billboard)	23
Chart (2008)	Position
US Top Country Albums (Billboard)	44

Singles

Year	Single	Chart positions
Year	Single	US Country
2007	"Missing You" (with John Waite)	34
2007	"Simple Love"	—
"—" denotes releases that did not chart

== Certifications and sales ==
Region	Certification	Certified units/sales
United Kingdom (BPI)	Silver	60,000^{‡}
United States (RIAA)	Gold	500,000^{^}
^{^} Shipments figures based on certification alone.^{‡} Sales+streaming figures based on certification alone.
