= Antoine Léger =

Antoine Léger may refer to:

- Antoine Joseph Léger (1880–1950), lawyer, author and political figure of Acadian descent in New Brunswick
- Antoine Léger (cannibal) (c. 1795–1824), French cannibal and murderer
