= Katsutarō =

- Gender: Male

Origin
- Origin: Japanese
- Meaning: Different meanings depending on the kanji used

Katsutarō, Katsutaro, Katsutaroh or Katsutarou (written: 勝太郎) is a masculine Japanese given name. Notable people with the name include:

- Katsutaro Baba (1877–1908), Japanese serial killer
- Inabata Katsutaro (稲畑 勝太郎; 1862–1949), Japanese businessman and film producer
- Katsutaro Kouta (小唄 勝太郎; 1904–1974), Japanese geisha and singer
- Udagawa Katsutarō (宇多川 勝太郎; 1939–1989), Japanese sumo wrestler
