= Babes in the Wood murders (Stanley Park) =

Two formerly unidentified murder victims

David and Derek Bousquet
- Facial reconstructions of David and Derek
- Born: February 27, 1940 (Derek); June 24, 1941 (David)
- Died: c. 1947
- Cause of death: Homicide by hatchet
- Body discovered: January 14, 1953; 73 years ago Stanley Park, Vancouver, British Columbia, Canada
- Other names: Derek and David D'Alton
- Known for: Unsolved murder victims who remained unidentified for over 69 years
- Mother: Eileen Bousquet

The Babes in the Wood murders is a name which has been used in the media to refer to a child murder case in which the bodies of two brothers, Derek and David D'Alton, also known as Derek and David Bousquet, were found concealed in woodland at Stanley Park in Vancouver, British Columbia, Canada. The Vancouver Police Department identified the brothers publicly on February 15, 2022.

== Discovery ==
The remains of two male victims (murdered about 1947) were discovered in Stanley Park, Vancouver, British Columbia, Canada on Wednesday, January 14, 1953. Police determined that a hatchet found at the crime scene, which was of a type commonly used by shingle weavers and lathers, had been used to kill the boys by striking them in the head. Their corpses had been arranged so that they were lying down in a straight line, with each boy's soles facing the other's, and then concealed with a woman's fur coat. The investigation was hampered when the medical examiner concluded that one victim was female. A DNA test conducted in 1998 proved that both victims were male and that they were brothers; they were between the ages of six and ten when they died.

== Identification ==
In 2018, detectives were planning on using consumer DNA databases such as Ancestry.com and 23andMe to research the identities of the victims.

This investigation came to a close in 2022, when the children were identified via forensic genealogy as Derek (born February 27, 1940) and David D'Alton (born June 24, 1941), the sons of Eileen Bousquet, who died in 1996.

Police said they believe the person who killed the brothers was likely a close relative who died approximately in the late 1990s.

== See also ==
- List of solved missing person cases (pre-1950)
- List of unsolved murders (1900–1979)
