= Spencer Walklate =

Australian rugby league footballer

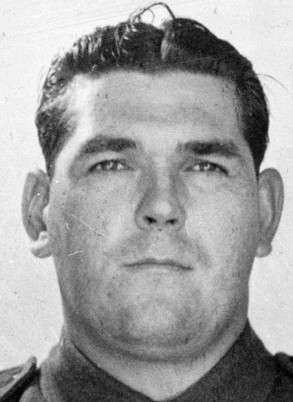
- Spencer Walklate (1943)

Personal information
- Full name: Spencer Henry Walklate
- Born: 11 January 1918 Maclean, New South Wales, Australia
- Died: 3 April 1945 (aged 27) Papua New Guinea

Playing information
- Weight: 15 st 0 lb (95 kg)
- Position: Prop, Second-row
Club
Years	Team	Pld	T	G	FG	P
1942–44	St. George	15	2	3	0	12
- Military career
- Allegiance: Australia
- Branch: Australian Army
- Service years: 1943-1945
- Unit: Z Special Unit
- Conflicts: World War II; New Guinea campaign

Spencer Walklate (11 January 1918 – 3 April 1945) was an Australian rugby league footballer who played in the 1940s and served as a special operations serviceman who was killed in action in World War II.

== Playing career ==
Spencer "Sam" Walklate was born in Maclean, New South Wales and came to the St George Dragons in 1942 during World War II. A policeman at Darlinghurst, Walklate was a big, strapping front row forward who made an immediate impact at the club with his fearless attack and defence. He played his last game for the St George on 8 April 1944 after suffering a knee injury.

== War service ==
Walklate had enlisted in the Australian Army at the end of the 1943 season and joined an elite special-ops group sent to New Guinea, which was under Japanese occupation at the time.

== Death ==
Listed as missing in action in mid-1945, he is believed to have been tortured and executed by the Japanese during a mission on 13 April 1945. His remains were not discovered until 2013, on Kairiru Island and were buried the following year at Port Moresby (Bomana) War Cemetery.

His name is included on the World War II Honour Roll at RSL Memorial at Bondi Junction. Spencer Walklate's brother, Eric Mervyn Walklate, was also killed in World War II.

== See also ==
- List of solved missing person cases (pre-1950)
