= Eva Neander =

Swedish author and poet

- A young Eva Neander
- Born: 3 April 1921; Jukkasjärvi, Sweden
- Died: 22 February 1950 (aged 28); Tiveden, Vaasa, Gothenburg, Sweden
- Resting place: Finnerödja Cemetery
- Education: University of Gothenburg, Uppsala University
- Occupations: Journalist, author and poet
- Writing career
- Period: 1940s

Eva Lydia Carolina Neander (3 April 1921, in Jukkasjärvi – 22 February 1950, in Tiveden) was a Swedish journalist as well as being one of the most eminent authors and poets of the 1940s. On 22 February 1950, she disappeared and was found dead, frozen in ice in Lake Unden.

== Life ==
Neander grew up on the small island of Mellan Holmen in Härnösand. Neander's mother was Emilia Karolina Neader née Svanberg, and her father was school inspector and statistician Ernst Albin Neander. Her father died when she was six years old. Several years later her mother remarried, becoming Emilia Neander-Nyström and the family moved to Borås in 1932 Neander lived in Borås until 1939 when the family moved to Gothenburg. In 1941, received her school-leaving certificate (Gymnasieexamen) in Gothenburg.

Eva Neander never married.

In the winter of 1949, traveling alone, she visited her old house in Finnerödja. On 22 February 1950, she disappeared and was subsequently found dead by her brother and brother-in-law, frozen in ice in Lake Unden.

== Career ==
After a study period at the University of Gothenburg and later Uppsala University that proved unsuccessful, Neander began her career at the Gothenburg non-fiction book reviewer Ny Tid, on the 2 February 1943, followed by a position at social democratic newspaper Västgöta-Demokraten in Borås, where she worked as a proofreader. It was at Västgöta-Demokraten that Neander began her writing career, writing poems, published under the name Eva-Caisa Neander as well as film reviews and short-stories under the name Tonia. In 1945, Neander's story titled: Vilse, won a short story competition at Åhlén & Åkerlund publishers. This was followed new position in 1946 at weekly magazine Vecko-Journalen.

In the same year, Neander expanded her short story Vilse, into a debut novel, Dimman (The Fog). It is her only novel. The novel, whilst dark and angst-ridden, is in the form of episodic prose poetry story, written in short and simple sentences about a sensitive, thin-skinned and clumsy young girl named Bitte, who is desperate for intimacy but shies away from it. As Bitte grows up, it brings her only new challenges. She seems to be separated from the rest of the world by a fog, which is both frightening and protective, and gradually Bitte finally sinks into it.

In 1947, Eva Neander's poetry collection, Död idyll, was published. The collection channels the influence of Swedish poet and novelist Karin Boye who in many ways was Neander's predecessor. That was followed by two collections of short stories: Staden and Nattljus. In Staden, the environment where the stories characters exist is based on Härnösand, where Neander grew up as a child. In Nattljus, the focus is on unhappy marriage. The writer’s second novel, Vattnet (The Water) which was unfinished when she died, is the only work by the writer in which the main character is a strong independent woman who wants to live and does not want to give up in the face of difficulties.

Her work was known outside of Sweden during her lifetime.

== Rediscovery ==
After Neander’s death, she was largely forgotten as was her work. However, in the 2000s, Neander's writings were rediscovered and republished by the small publishers Eolit, Rosenlarv and Vendels förlag.

== See also ==
- List of solved missing person cases (pre-1950)

== Bibliography ==
- Neander, Eva. Dimman (in Swedish). Stockholm: Bonnier. OCLC 185993723. (Novel)
- Neander, Eva (1947). Staden (in Swedish). Stockholm: Bonnier. OCLC 185993756. (Novella)
- Neander, Eva (1947). Död idyll : dikter (in Swedish). Stockholm: Bonnier. OCLC 185993732. (Poems)
- Neander, Eva (1949). Nattljus (in Swedish). Stockholm: Bonnier. OCLC 13372387. (Short stories)
- Neander, Eva (1951). Lilla Bror och lilla syster (in Swedish). Stockholm: Bonnier. OCLC 758843728. (Prose and poetry)

== Literature ==
=== Articles ===
- Jonsson, Erik (2011). "Priset för ett hekto ro : en kort introdukton till Eva Neander". Provins (Piteå) (in Swedish). 1: 24–29. ISSN 0280-9974. OCLC 939004968.
- Neander, Eva (1948). "Kalejdoskop". All Världens Berättare. 6.
- Mortensen, Anders (2004). Från Eden till damavdelningen : studier om kvinnan i litteraturen : en vänbok till Christina Sjöblad (in Swedish). Lund: Litteraturvetenskapliga institutionen i Lund. pp. 217–224. ISBN 9188396207. OCLC 937323613.
- Strömstedt, Bo (1950). "Eva Neander". Svensk Litteraturtidskrift (in Swedish). 13 (4): 176–189. ISSN 0039-663X. OCLC 938319553.

=== Books ===
- Berggren, Kerstin (1953). Eva Neander (in Swedish). Stockholm. OCLC 186896547.
- Runefeldt, Eva (1978). "Eva Neander". Författarnas litteraturhistoria, red (in Swedish). Vol. III. Stockholm: Lars Ardelius och Gunnar Rydström. pp. 375–381.
- Åhlén, Bengt (1953). Svenskt författarlexikon (in Swedish). Vol. 2. Stockholm: Rabén & Sjögrens Förlag. p. 427. OCLC 37667949.

=== Newspaper ===
- Ellerström, Jona. "Bokhyllan. Kvinnor i staden..." (in Swedish). Helsingborgs Dagblad AB. Helsingborg Dagblad. 961103.
- Risberg, Leif. "Eva Neander- en bortglömd diktare". Correspondenten i Linköping AB. Östgöta-Correspondenten. 800424.
- Furuhammar, Sten. "Om man med prägel menar tydliga och…" (in Swedish). Gota Media AB. Borås Tidning. 000707.
- Furuhammar, Sten. "På bokrea, troligen 1949, köpte jag ..." (in Swedish). Gota Media AB. Borås Tidning. 000619-000620.
