= Babes in the Wood murders (Pine Grove Furnace) =

Murder of three children in Pennsylvania

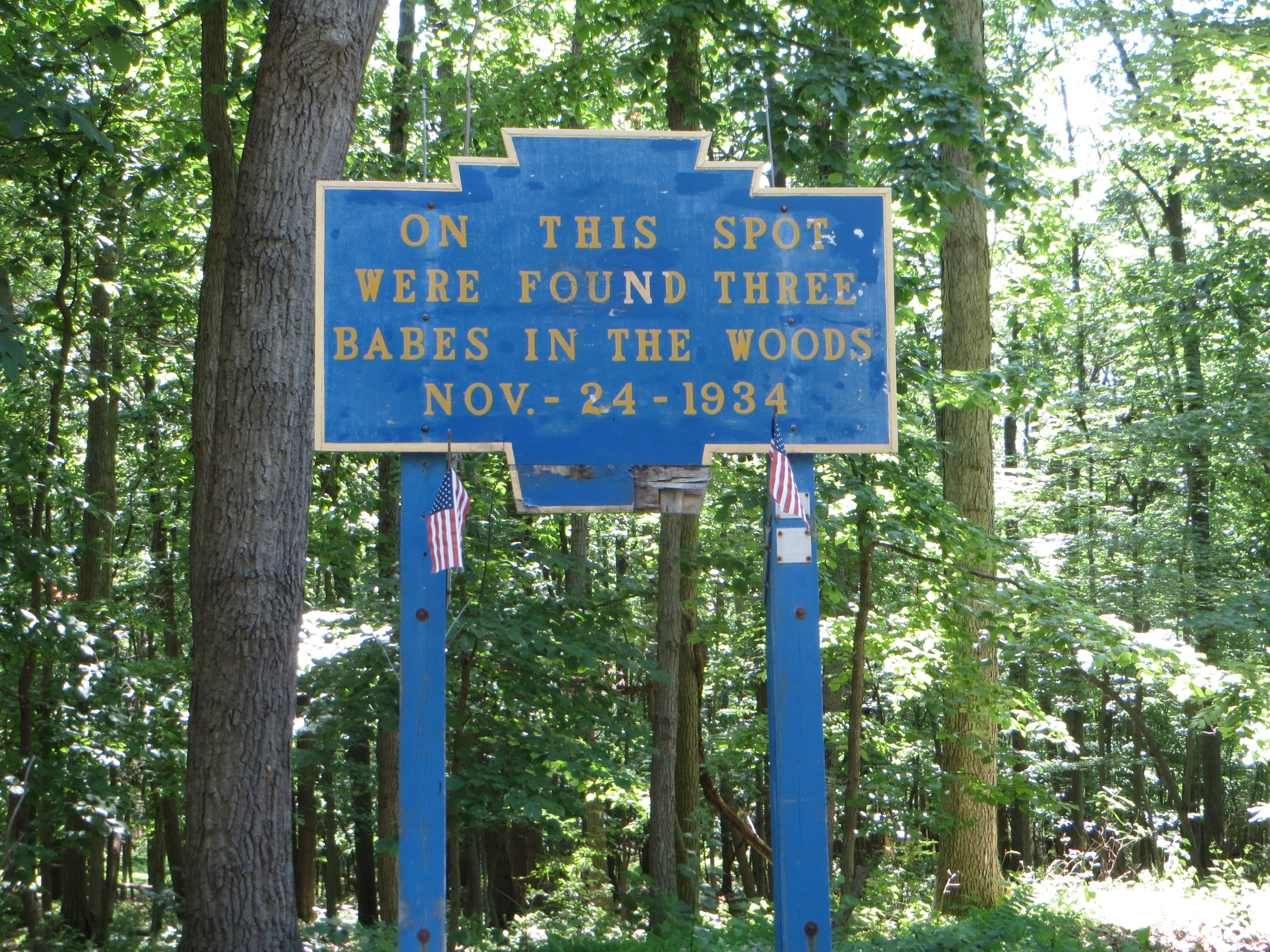
- Memorial sign on Pennsylvania Route 233
- Location: Pine Grove Furnace State Park, Cooke Township, Cumberland County, Pennsylvania, U.S. (discovery of bodies)
- Date: between 11/12 and 23 November 1934 (date of death); 24 November 1934 (date body discovered)
- Attack type: Triple homicide; child murder
- Victims: Norma Sedgwick, 12; Dewilla Noakes, 10; Cordelia Noakes, 8
- Perpetrator: Elmo Noakes
- Motive: Unknown

The Babes in the Wood Murders is a name that was used in the media to refer to a child murder case in which the bodies of three girls were found in Pennsylvania woodland.

On November 24, 1934, John Clark and Clark Jardine found the bodies of Norma Sedgwick, 12, Dewilla Noakes, 10, and Cordelia Noakes, 8, under a blanket in the woods along Pennsylvania Route 233, Centerville Road. They had been suffocated, presumably by Elmo Noakes (father of Dewilla and Cordelia, and stepfather of Norma).

The next day, Elmo shot and killed his 18-year-old niece Winifred Pierce, then himself with a .22 rifle.

== Events preceding the murders ==
1. 1934: Noakes is known to have a good reputation and a non-violent nature. He has a good job and lives in a good home which is well stocked with food. His niece, Winifred Pierce, works during the days in Noakes' home, taking care of his children.
2. September 1934: Noakes acquired life insurance policies on his children and changed the beneficiary of his own life insurance from the children to his sister, Mrs. Pierce.
3. October 31, 1934: Noakes purchased a blue sedan, which was later found abandoned near the place of his suicide.
4. November 11/12, 1934: Noakes left home with Winifred Pierce (his niece) and the three girls, leaving behind two weeks' pay ($50) that was owed to him.
5. November, 1934: The family stopped at a diner in Philadelphia and shared a meal.
6. November, 1934: The girls' bodies were placed in the woods of Pine Grove Furnace State Park near Carlisle, Pennsylvania.
7. November, 1934: Noakes and Pierce abandoned their blue sedan at McVeytown, Pennsylvania, and hitchhiked to Blair County.
8. November 23, 1934: Having failed to sell Noakes' spectacles, Pierce sold her coat. In Altoona, Pennsylvania, Noakes bought a .22 rifle with $2.55 from the coat sale.
9. November 24, 1934: Norma, Dewilla, and Cordelia were found dead under a blanket in Pine Grove Furnace Park. The cause of their death was determined to be "suffocation by external means."
10. November 25, 1934: Noakes and Pierce were found dead in a railroad station near Duncansville, Pennsylvania. Pierce, with her breast exposed, had been shot through the heart and then in the head. Noakes was killed by a single gunshot wound to his head.

== Identification of the bodies ==
Discovery of the girls' bodies started a nationwide media frenzy resulting in many false leads as to the identities of the girls. Photographs of the children lying on a blanket were printed in newspapers across the country. Thousands came to view the bodies in hopes of identifying them.

Death masks were made before burial to aid in the search for the girls' identities. Some clothing, towels, and children's books were found, but labels which may have contained their names had been torn off. Only the name "Norma" was found in one of the children's books.

Noakes and Pierce were found over 100 miles away, near Altoona, Pennsylvania the day after discovery of the girls' bodies. Pierce had a gunshot wound to the heart and another to the head. Noakes had a single gunshot wound to the head.

Using the description of the car, the reasoning for this identification the physical features of the dead girls, and Elmo Noakes' fingerprints on military records, the bodies were identified.

== Competing theories ==
There are many theories which purport to account for the tragedy.

Early speculations included a cult killing due to a "sign" or mystic symbol found upon the head of Norma Sedgwick. But other experts believed that it was a head wound.

Chief of Police E.E. York of Roseville, California, believed that Elmo Noakes did not kill the girls because, "His affection for the children was known all over the community." He believed that automobile exhaust accidentally killed them. Then Noakes and Pierce, stricken with fear of being held responsible, committed suicide.

Others speculated that the family were being pursued by an armed gang.

Other theories are:

- Noakes and Pierce fled so that they could be together. Noakes's inability to find work and the threat of starvation was too much for Noakes and Pierce, and the girls were suffocated to prevent further suffering. They thought it would be better for the kids.
- Noakes was mentally ill and fleeing an imaginary evil. The children were killed to protect them from it.
- Difficulties within the family and rumors of their romantic relationship led to feelings of hopelessness. A murder-suicide pact was then formed between Noakes and Pierce.

== Family strife ==
After the bodies had been identified, two of Elmo's sisters were each given a suspended 90-day sentence for disturbing the peace by harassing a third sister (Winifred Pierce's mother).

One of the sisters, Ms. Gibby, accused Winifred's mother, of spreading "stories" about Elmo. She said that, "If it hadn't been for your family, he'd still be alive." She further claimed that she "warned Elmo not to have anything to do with her [Winifred Pierce] ... Winnie could make him do about anything she wanted him to."

Both sisters denied the charges against them in court, claiming that they merely wished to console their sister and to inquire about Winifred's foot deformity in order to help identify her body. Upon being sentenced, the two sisters screamed furiously and disrupted the court, requiring the judge to restore order.

Robert Noakes (Elmo's brother) responded to the media by saying, "There's been trouble in the family for years, I guess that's why Elmo went away." Robert also claimed that "There was trouble in the Pierce home, Mrs. Pierce and her husband didn't get along sometimes. My brother made a home for Winifred. It was more pleasant there, and so when he left I suppose she felt she would be happier with him."

Concerning his three quarreling sisters Robert said, "Those three sisters are good as gold, but they just don't seem to understand each other all the time. And then there are stories about 'boy friends' and it is all rot and just made up for spite." He felt that strife in the family may have caused Elmo to leave — "Sometimes I don't blame Elmo, because in 1930 I went away for a couple of years myself to Tucson, Ariz. to get away from it. I think that's just what he did."

== Aftermath ==
- In March 1935, the Pennsylvania General Assembly discussed a bill sponsored by Representative John L. Powers to fingerprint all school children in the state.
- In 1968, Pennsylvania highway workers installed a blue and yellow sign which reads, "On this spot were found three babes in the woods — Nov. 24, 1934" The site is at 40°03.956′N 77°18.299′W.
- Cumberland County paid $997.75 to doctors, coroners, and photographers who investigated the deaths.
- A publication of the Noakes family history states that Winifred Pierce died at the age of 18 and that "Elmo J. Noakes and his children died in an auto accident."
- The memory of these events is kept alive by numerous web pages. Some of these include a graphic picture of the deceased girls at the site where they were discovered.

Case photographs, newspaper articles, and artifacts can be viewed at the Pennsylvania State Police Museum, located in Hershey, Pennsylvania.

=== Funeral services ===
Funeral services for the three girls were attended by thousands of people. Boy Scouts and Girl Scouts were pallbearers, and prayers were recited by various local religious leaders. Noakes and Pierce were buried in the same cemetery as the three girls. The American Legion honored Noakes for his military service with full military honors, about 100 feet from the graves of his daughters.

== Elmo and Robert Noakes ==
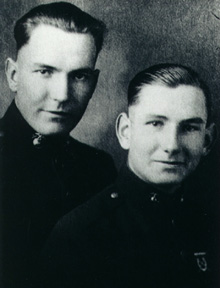
Robert (left) & Elmo (right) Noakes

Elmo James Noakes was born January 8, 1903, in Springville, Utah. He was the youngest son of John Thomas Noakes and Amilla Ann Guymon.

Elmo and his brother Robert served in the United States Marine Corps from 1920 to 1922.

On July 28, 1923, Elmo married Mary Isabel Hayford, who had a daughter named Norma Sedgwick from her previous marriage to Roland Burningham Sedgwick. Noakes and Hayford had two children, Dewilla (born May 2, 1924) and Cordelia (born June 2, 1926).

Mary Noakes, née Hayford, died from "septicemia hemolytic" following a self-induced abortion on July 10, 1932, in Salt Lake City, Utah. Noakes then took the three girls to Roseville, California, where his three sisters could help raise them. Noakes was employed in Roseville by Pacific Fruit Express.

== Winifred Pierce ==
Winifred Pierce was born September 1, 1916, in Bingham Canyon, Utah, to her parents, Hugh Pierce and Pearl Noakes (who was Elmo's older sister). Winifred's family moved to Roseville, California, where she attended high school.

At the age of 18, she was working for Elmo Noakes as a housekeeper.

== See also ==
- List of murdered American children
- List of solved missing person cases (pre-1950)
