= Agapit Leblanc =

Canadian Fishery officer (1887–1926)

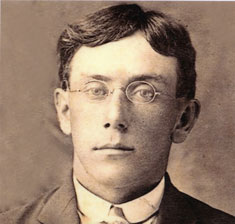
- Fishery officer Agapit Leblanc.
- Born: 1887; Bouctouche, New Brunswick, Canada
- Died: October 20, 1887 (aged 39); Bouctouche, New Brunswick, Canada
- Occupation: Fishery officer
- Known for: Murdered in the line of duty

Agapit Leblanc (1887–1926) was a Canadian Fishery officer from Bouctouche, New Brunswick. He was 39 years old when he died on October 20, 1926, while investigating illegal smelt fishing. He was the first Canadian Fishery officer to be murdered while on duty. His body was found in the Bouctouche Bay on October 24, 1926, weighted down with rocks. His murderers were never found. Doctors testified that Leblanc's face had been shot with numerous small pellets from an apparent long-range distance due to the minor skin damage he received. They stated that Leblanc also suffered non-fatal blows, ultimately dying from shock.

According to his family, Leblanc had received anonymous death threats in the weeks prior to his murder, including a picture of a coffin with the annotation:

Voici ton cercueil si tu n'arrêtes pas de venir nous trouver sur la mer
Here's your coffin if you don't stop coming to find us on the sea.

They pointed out that the murder occurred during the prohibition of alcohol in Canada.

== Namesake of a Hero-class vessel ==
In 2011 the Department of Fisheries and Oceans announced that the nine new vessels of what had been known as the "mid-shore patrol vessels" would be named after individuals known for their heroism, who had died in the line of duty. The seventh of the nine vessels was named after Leblanc. Gail Shea, Minister of Fisheries and Oceans officiated at her commissioning on July 9, 2015.

== See also ==
- List of solved missing person cases (pre-1950)
