= Julie Lee =

American singer-songwriter

Julie Lee is a singer/songwriter originally from Maryland now living in Nashville, Tennessee. She is a member of the band Old Black Kettle, with Sarah Siskind, and has collaborated with Sarah Masen, Ron Block, Mike Farris, Vince Gill, Tim O'Brien, & Kenny Vaughan. Her songs have been covered by a wide range of artists, but most notably Alison Krauss with "Away Down the River" and "Jacob's Dream" (the story of the Lost Children of the Alleghenies) appearing on Krauss' album, A Hundred Miles or More: A Collection (2007). Lee has toured in the UK and US as an Americana/folk artist. She has opened for Alison Krauss & Union Station at The Historic Ryman Auditorium in 2001 and played her own set at The Newport Folk Festival in 2007.

== Albums ==
- Stones (1999, Independent)
- Many Waters (2000)
- Made From Scratch (2003)
- Stillhouse Road (2004, Compadre)
- Take Me Out to Hear the Band (2007, Independent)
- OBK LIVE (2007) (Old Black Kettle Live at The Station Inn)
- Will There Really Be A Morning" (2009)
- Julie Lee & The Baby-Daddies (2012)
- Till And Mule (2013)

=== Contributions ===
- "The Choir At Your Door" (2006)- "Angel's We Have Heard On High"
- Song of America (2007) - "Once More Our God Vouchsafe to Shine"
- Angel Band: The Hymn Sessions (Andrew Greer) (2012) - "Down By the Riverside"
- "An East Nashville Christmas" (duet with Mike Farris)-"Go Tell It On The Mountain"

== Lee's songs covered by other artists ==
- "Beautiful Night" - Pam Tillis (Just in Time for Christmas)
- "Undone" - Mark Erelli
- "Here the Mountaintops to Roam" - Dave Peterson and 1946
- "Stillhouse Road - Mark Newton Band (Hillbilly Pilgrim)
- "Away Down the River" - Alison Krauss (A Hundred Miles or More: A Collection)
- "Jacob's Dream" - Alison Krauss (A Hundred Miles or More: A Collection)
