= Lost Children of the Alleghenies =

1856 missing persons case in Pavia, United States

George and Joseph Cox
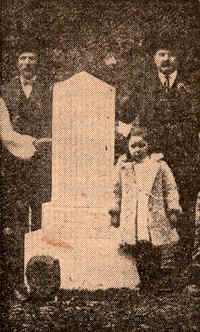
- Picture taken when the monument for the Lost Children of the Alleghenies was first erected. Newspaper picture of monument dedication in 1910.
- Disappeared: Pavia, Pennsylvania, April 24, 1856
- Died: Found May 8, 1856, George (aged 7) Joseph (aged 5)
- Parents: Samuel Cox (father); Susannah Cox (mother)

The Lost Children of the Alleghenies were two missing brothers from the Appalachia region of the United States. George and Joseph Cox, then aged seven and five respectively, disappeared from their Spruce Hollow home near Lovely and Pavia, Pennsylvania, on April 24, 1856. Their dead bodies were found several days later in the surrounding woods and were buried in the Mount Union cemetery near their home in Pavia.

There is a small memorial to them in the Spruce Hollow forest in Blue Knob State Park, Pennsylvania.

== Background ==
George, 7, and Joseph, 5, were the sons of Samuel and Susannah Cox. The Cox family lived in a cabin built by Samuel for his wife and children. At this time old-growth logging had not yet begun in this area of Pennsylvania and the area was still heavily forested.

== Disappearance ==
During the morning of April 24, 1856, Samuel Cox heard his dog barking in the forest and thought that it must have trapped a squirrel in a tree. Samuel retrieved his rifle and headed into the woods. It is thought that while Samuel was gone, the boys must have strayed from home to follow their father. Susannah thought that Samuel had taken the boys with him. It was only when Samuel returned without them that they realized their children were gone. They called for the boys, but received no replies. Samuel went for help from his nearest neighbors and by that evening more than one hundred men were searching for the children. Fires were lit in the forest in the hope that the boys would see one and approach. Nearly a thousand people showed up to search the next day. A nearby stream, Bobs Creek, was surging with spring snow melt and it was thought that there was no way the boys could have crossed to the other side without drowning. A search of the creek was performed, but the boys were not found.

On April 26, suspicion fell on Samuel and Susannah Cox. It was thought that they might have murdered their children in the hope of gathering donations from a sympathetic population. The Cox cabin and garden were searched but no bodies were located. The searchers went so far as to bring in a dowser and a witch from Somerset County. The dowser found nothing and the witch, despite claiming to know the children's location, led a search team through the woods for hours without turning up anything.

== Discovery ==
A local farmer, Jacob Dibert, heard about the missing children and remarked to his wife that he wished to be able to dream of the boys' location. On May 2, 1856, he had a dream in which he walked a path through the woods past a dead deer, a child's shoe and a fallen birch tree and eventually to a copse of birch trees in a small ravine. Here he found the bodies of the Cox boys. The dream reoccurred on the two following nights. Dibert told no one but his wife about the dream; however, he felt that the dream was prophetic and on May 7 he told his brother-in-law Harrison Whysong. Whysong recognised elements from Dibert's dream, and the two men decided to make a search, culminating in the discovery of the bodies just as the dream had described—under birch trees in a small ravine reached along a track with a dead deer, a child's shoe, and a fallen birch.

== Aftermath ==
In 1906, for the 50th anniversary of the event, the community of Pavia took up donations for a Lost Children of the Alleghenies Monument to honor the Cox family. In 1910, they erected the monument at the spot where Joseph and George Cox were found over 50 years earlier.

== Songs ==
Alison Krauss released a song written by Julie Lee and John Pennell about the story entitled "Jacob's Dream".

Jason Bolinger wrote the song "Lost Children of the Alleghenies".

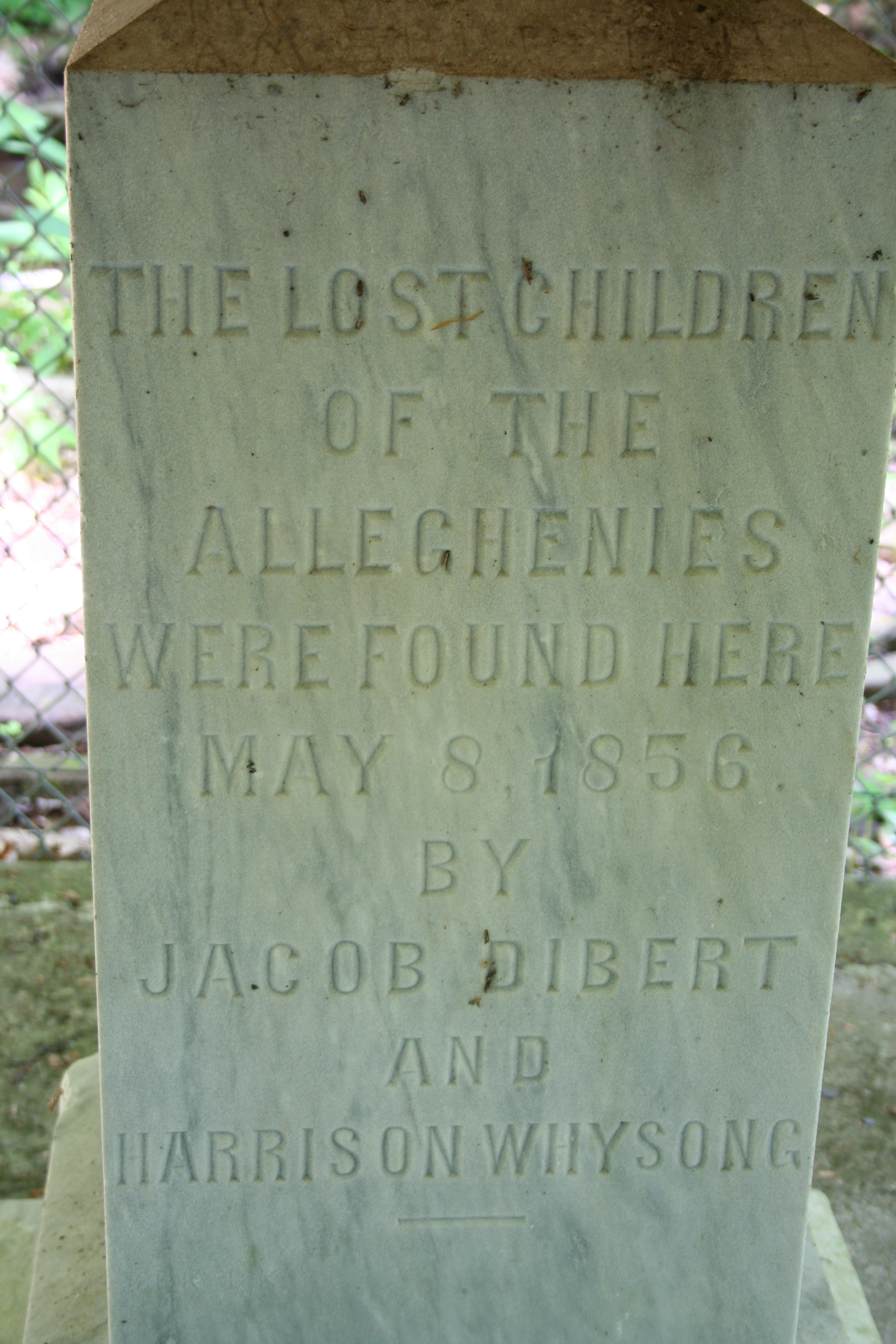
Text of the monument erected to remember the Lost Children of the Alleghenies.

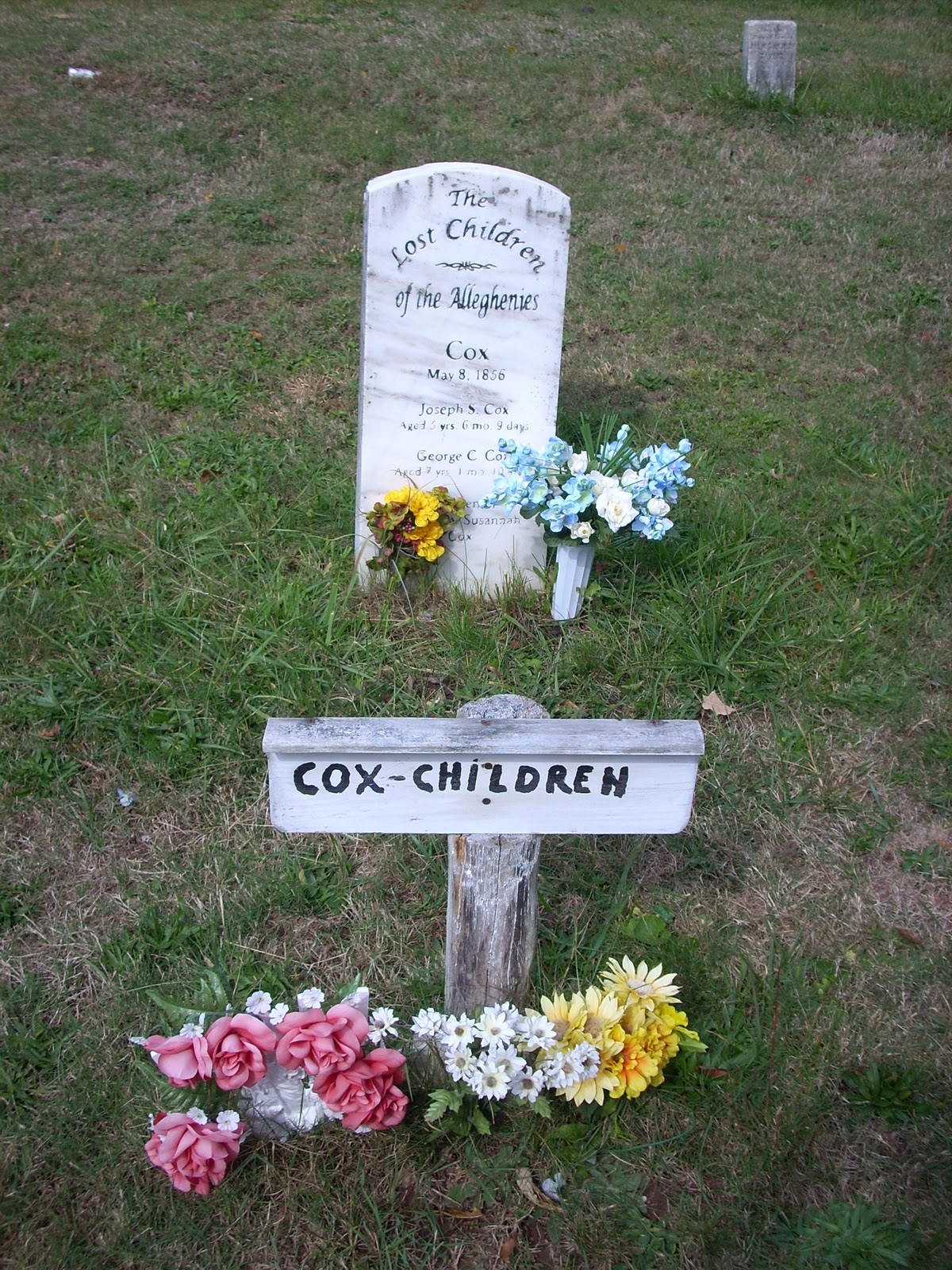
The grave site of the children in Mount Union Cemetery, PA

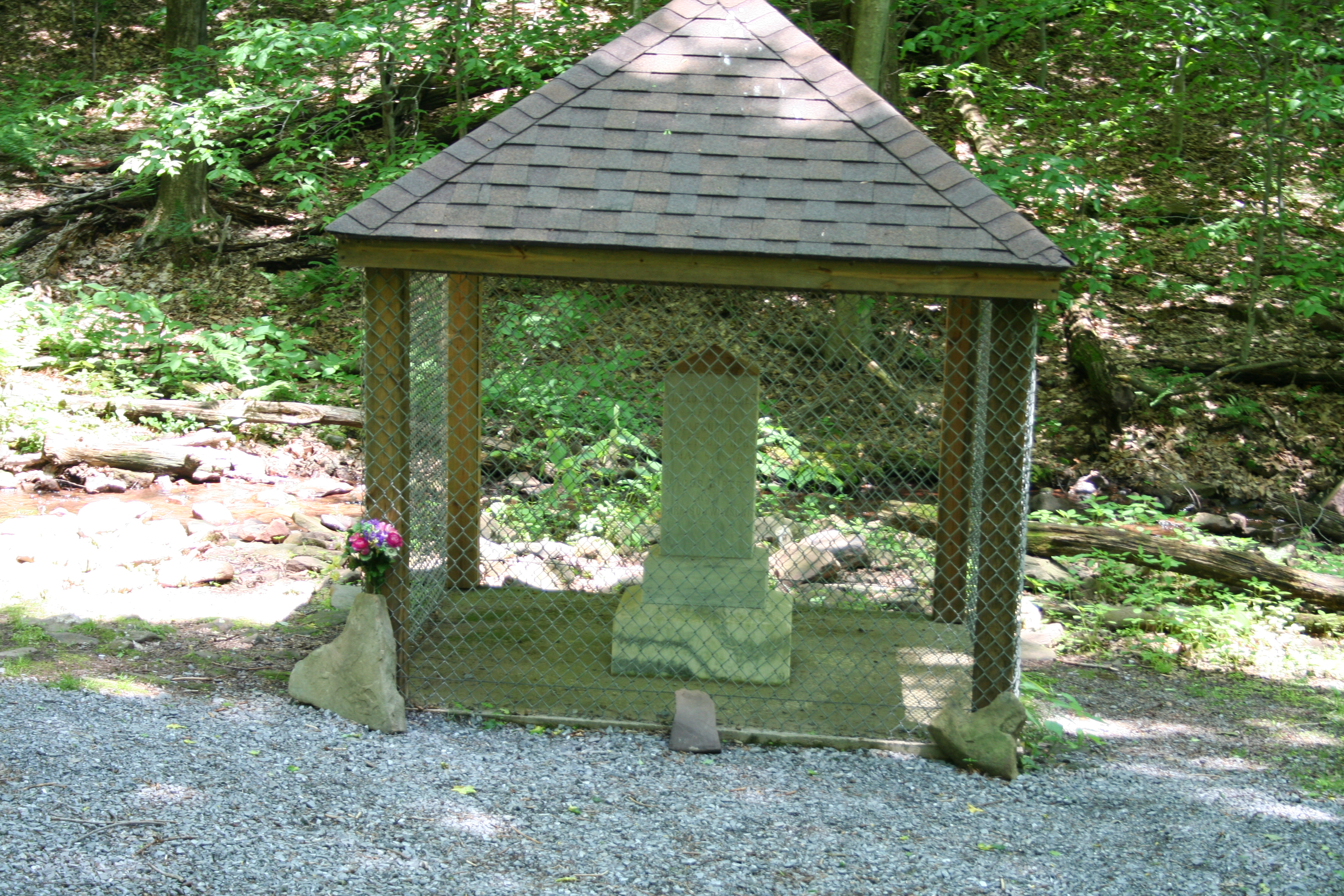
The monument in Blue Knob State Park

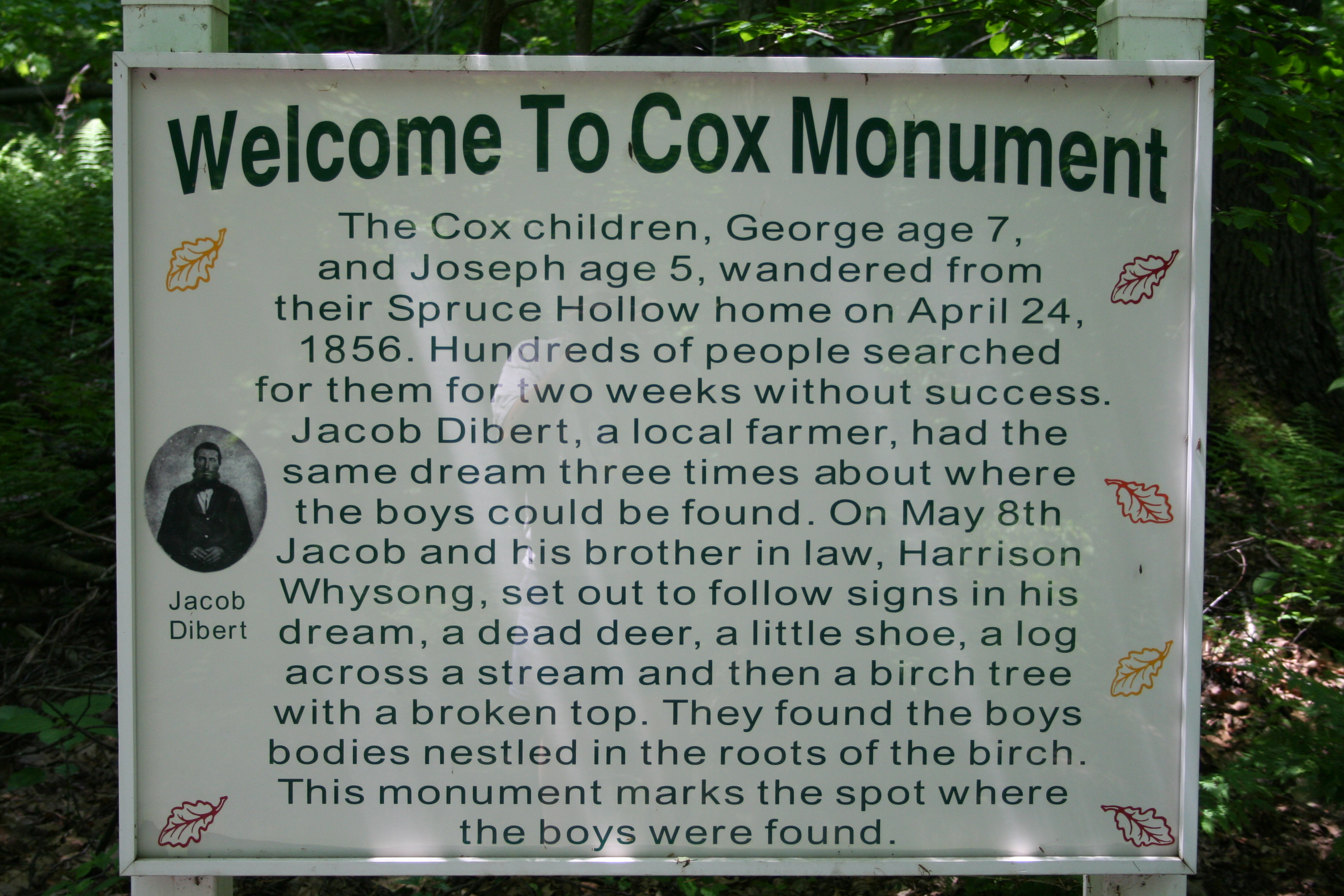
Photo of the sign erected explaining the events of the Lost Children of the Alleghenies in Blue Knob State Park

== See also ==
- List of solved missing person cases (pre-1950)
- List of unsolved deaths
