= Pelican Point Murders =

Unsolved 1895 triple homicide in Utah County, Utah

Pelican Point murders
- Date: February 16–17, 1895
- Location: Pelican Point, Utah County, Utah, United States
- Type: Homicide
- Outcome: Unsolved
- Deaths: 3

The Pelican Point murders refer to the 1895 killings of three cousins and ranch hands: Albert Enstrom (age 24), Andrew Johnson (22), and Alfred Nelson (15). Their bodies were discovered in Utah Lake near Pelican Point, Utah County, Utah, following an extensive disappearance. Despite a high-profile trial and a subsequent gubernatorial pardon, the case remains one of the most notorious unsolved crimes in Utah's history.

== Background and disappearance ==
The three victims worked at a livestock operation situated at Pelican Point, a remote area on the western shore of Utah Lake. On February 16, 1895, the men traveled to Lehi, Utah to attend a legal hearing involving a property dispute between Harry Hayes (the owner of the ranch and Enstrom's stepfather) and a neighbor, Oliver Slade. The cousins were seen returning toward the ranch that evening but never arrived. Initially, family members believed the young men had left for the Arizona Territory to seek work, delaying a formal missing persons report for several weeks.

In March 1895, Caroline Hayes visited the ranch and found her son Albert's clothing and tools still on site. Realizing they would not have abandoned their property to move south, she requested an investigation.

== Discovery of the bodies ==
In April 1895, as the ice on Utah Lake thawed, Albert Enstrom's body was discovered floating near the shoreline. Within days, the bodies of Andrew Johnson and Alfred Nelson surfaced approximately three miles away. Each victim had been shot in the head at close range. Evidence suggested they were killed while sleeping in their cabin; the perpetrators then transported the bodies onto the frozen lake and dropped them through a hole cut in the ice. A wagon, horses, and several firearms were missing from the property.

== Legal proceedings and investigation ==
Harry Hayes was initially arrested and convicted of the murders in 1896, receiving a death sentence. However, Sheriff George Storrs, believing Hayes was innocent, conducted an independent investigation that led Governor Heber Manning Wells to grant Hayes a full pardon.

Storrs redirected the investigation toward George H. Wright (alias James G. Weeks), a known cattle rustler. Storrs identified stolen goods from the ranch, including a distinctive "blocked" remnant quilt and a Spencer repeating rifle with unique markings on the stock, at a cabin Wright had previously rented in Mapleton, Utah. Although Wright was later implicated in a murder in Colorado, he was never apprehended for the Pelican Point crimes. In 1914, a prisoner in Los Angeles named W. E. Davis reportedly confessed to the killings, but the claim was never corroborated.

== Legacy ==
The victims are buried in the cemetery in Benjamin, Utah. Their shared headstone bears the following inscription:

"But truth shall conquer at the last, for round and round we run, and ever the right comes uppermost, and ever is justice done."

The Spencer rifle and other artifacts from the case are on display at the John Hutchings Museum in Lehi.

== See also ==
- List of unsolved murders (before 1900)
- Crime in Utah
