= Tony Creasman =

American drummer

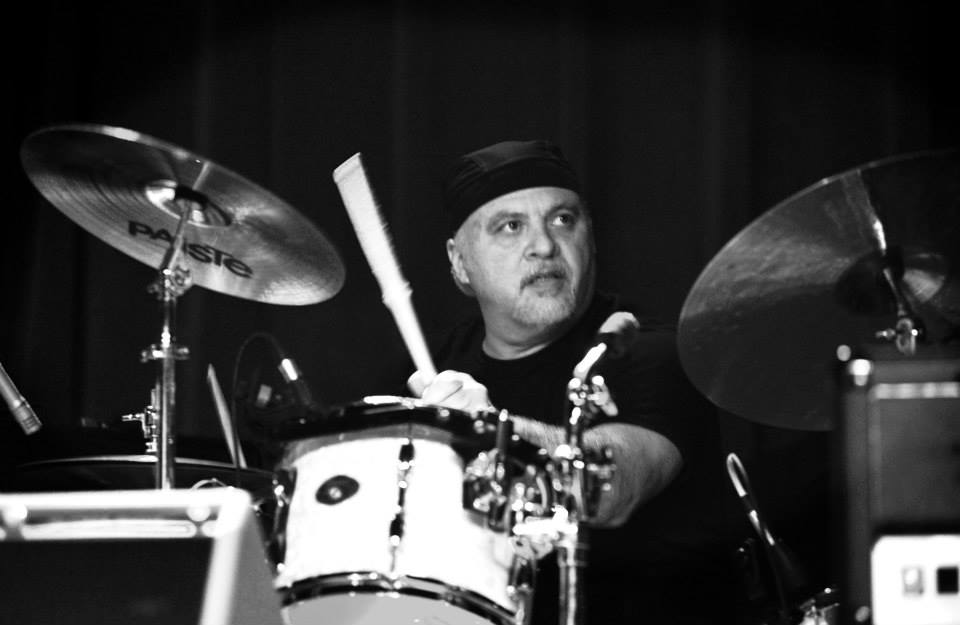
Tony Creasman

Tony Creasman is a professional session drummer and percussionist. Creasman has played on various albums and songs for many different artists. He resides in North Carolina and does most of his session work at Crossroads Studios in Arden, North Carolina.

== Bio ==
Creasman began playing the drums at a very young age and knew early on his talent as a percussionist and drummer would be his career choice. Creasman began his studio session work in the 1980s and quickly became sought out as a first class studio session drummer. Creasman has played on many top gospel recordings over the last 30 years, much of his work performed at Crossroads Studios. The list of number one songs he has played a part in over three decades exceeds the forties and continues to grow every year. Creasman has also been session drummer for such popular artists as Willie Nelson, James Taylor, Alison Krauss, Waylon Jennings, Emmylou Harris, Glen Campbell, Merle Haggard, Sam Bush, Tony Rice, and many more.
