= Une ténébreuse affaire =

1841 novel by Honoré de Balzac

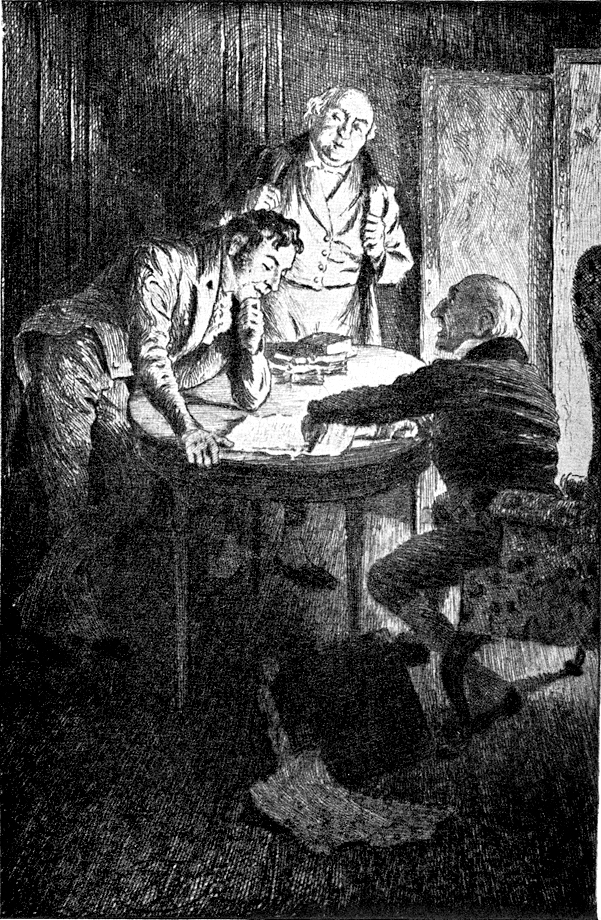
- Author: Honoré de Balzac
- Language: French
- Series: La Comédie humaine
- Publication date: 1841
- Publication place: France

Une ténébreuse affaire (English "A Murky Business" or "A Historical Mystery") is a novel by Honoré de Balzac, published in 1841. It was originally published in serial form in Le Journal du Commerce. It is one of the Scènes de la vie politique in La Comédie humaine.

== Plot summary ==
The heroine of the story is Laurence de Cinq-Cygne, a young aristocrat living in the Aube region of France. An elderly aristocratic couple, the d'Hauteserres have come to live with her. Their sons, Robert and Adrien have gone into exile to fight against Napoleon. The story starts in 1803 when Laurence is taking part in a Royalist conspiracy to overthrow Napoleon who is then First Consul. Her cousins the Simeuse twins, and Robert and Adrien d'Hauteserre, who are all exiled aristocrats, return secretly to France to take part in the plot, and she helps to hide them.

However the plot is discovered, and Corentin and Peyrade who are spies working for Police Minister, Joseph Fouché travel to Aube to find the conspirators. Senator Malin, a leading politician who now owns the Simeuse brothers' confiscated property of Gondreville, also travels there to hide evidence of his own dealings with Louis XVIII.

Malin discusses his dilemma in a field at Gondreville with his notary Grevin, but is overheard by his bailiff, Michu. Michu had been bailiff of Gondreville when it belonged to the Simeuse family, and he remains loyal to them. Michu then goes to warn Laurence that the conspiracy has been discovered. He and Laurence then take the four young aristocrats to a ruined monastery in the woods as a hiding place. As a result, Corentin and Peyrade are thwarted in their search. However, the wider conspiracy against Napoleon is defeated.

Just before Napoleon's coronation as Emperor, an application is made by Monsieur d'Hauteserre on behalf of his sons and the Simeuses that their rights as citizens should be restored. This is granted by Napoleon during a cabinet meeting, and so the two pairs of brothers emerge from hiding and settle in Laurence's home at Cinq-Cygne.

Laurence is in love with both of the Simeuse twins, and they are in love with her, and she needs to decide which one she will marry. Adrien, the younger of the d'Hauteserres is also in love with her, but his love is unrequited. Laurence's elderly relative Marquis de Chargebœuf urges the young men to serve in Napoleon's army in order to win favour. They all refuse, and they and Laurence remain committed in their opposition to Napoleon.

Laurence, the Simeuses, the d'Hauteserre brothers and Michu go the Gondreville farmlands to recover Simeuse family money which had been buried by Michu when the estate had been seized during the revolution. On the very same day, Senator Malin is kidnapped by five masked men from the manor house at Gondreville. As a result of this the four young aristocrats and Michu, are all put on trial in Troyes for the abduction. During the trial, Malin is hidden by his kidnappers in the same abandoned monastery where the four aristocrats hid after their earlier failed plot. Michu's wife is tricked into delivering food to Malin, thinking that it is her husband's wish. Then Malin is released whilst the trial is in progress. The new evidence from Malin leads to the conviction of Michu to death and the four noblemen to imprisonment.

Marquis de Chargebœuf goes to Paris to ask Talleyrand, the foreign minister for help in getting a pardon for the convicted men. Talleyrand writes a letter to Napoleon requesting a pardon, but says that Laurence needs to ask Napoleon in person. He also reveals that Corentin was behind the abduction of Malin. The Marquis and Laurence then go to Prussia with Talleyrand's letter, where Napoleon is leading a military campaign. They arrive at Jena in October 1806, the day before the battle to be fought there. Napoleon grants a pardon to the four noblemen, but not Michu.

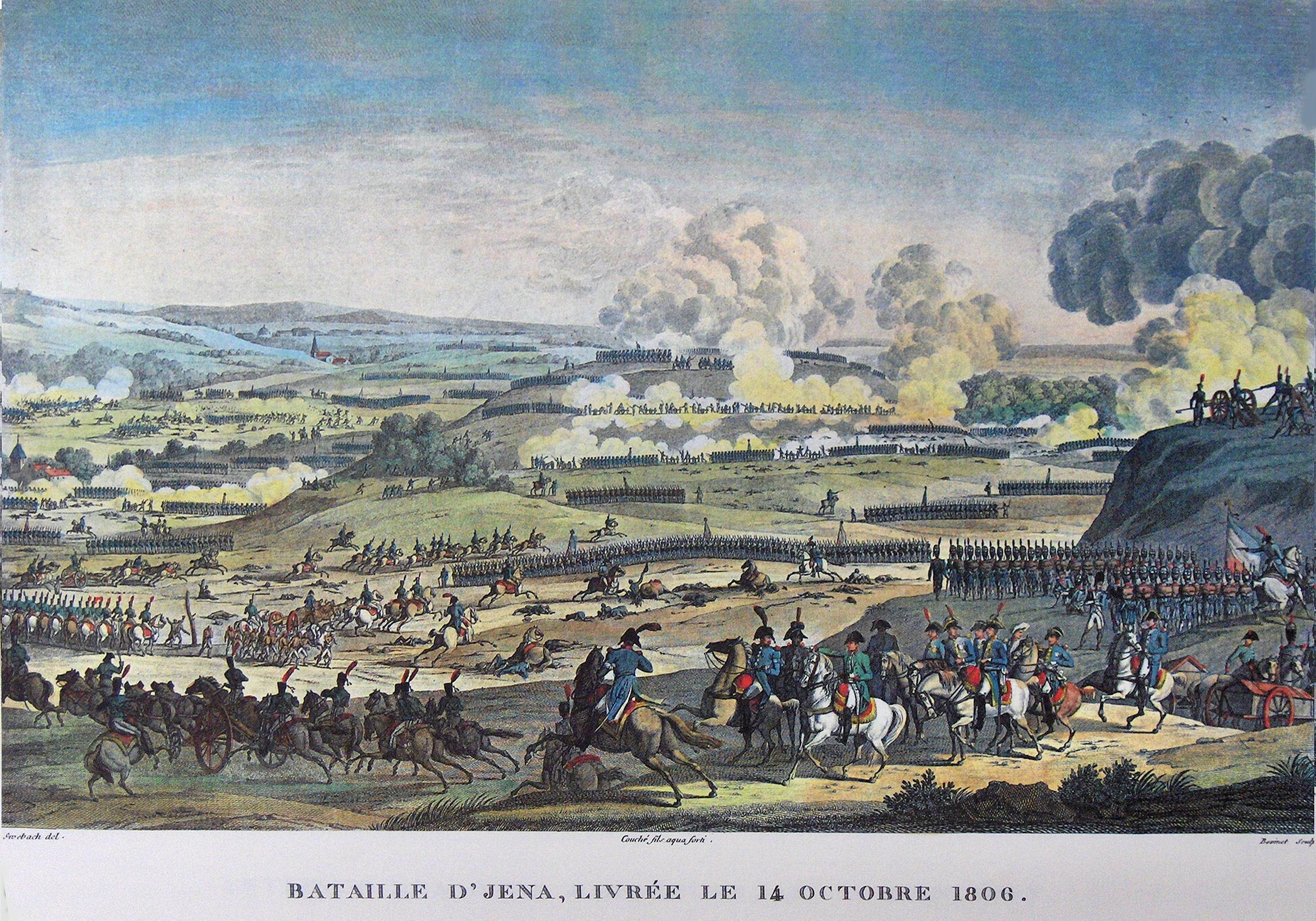
The Battle of Jena.

Laurence arrives back in France in time to farewell Michu before his execution. She also finds that the four noblemen are to enlist as officers in Napoleon's army. In the years that follow, the Simeuse twins and Robert d'Hauteserre all die in action. Adrien d'Hauteserre is wounded, and comes back to Cinq-Cygne to be nursed to health. He and Laurence later marry.

In an epilogue set in 1833, Laurence and Malin meet by chance at a party. An angry Laurence leaves immediately and Malin also soon leaves in embarrassment. Henri de Marsay who is present at the party explains to the other guests the reason for this, and gives details of Malin's involvement in an unsuccessful political plot with Talleyrand, Fouché, and others against Napoleon in 1800, and how his efforts to cover it up had led to the problems that Laurence experienced.

== Historical background ==
The kidnapping of Malin was based on a real incident, the kidnapping of Dominique Clément de Ris in 1800, from his chateau in Beauvais in Touraine. He was a senator who was involved in a conspiracy against Napoleon, along with Talleyrand and Fouché. Balzac's father, who was an official in Tours at the time knew Clément de Ris, and passed on his knowledge of the incident to his son.

The 1803 conspiracy in which the characters of the novel were involved was a real conspiracy. The novel briefly describes how the plot was defeated and mentions the arrests of its leaders Cadoudal, Pichegru and Moreau.

== Themes ==
Herbert J. Hunt wrote "One of Balzac's most intense convictions was that in the sphere of political activity principles of private morality go to the wall. 'Rulers must never be hedged round by the principles governing private morality' he was to write in 1846. This questionable maxim lies behind a historical novel - Sur Catherine de Médicis - on which he was at work during a long period, from 1830 to 1843. It helps to explain his basic approval, in A Murky Business of such unscrupulous statesmen as Fouché and Talleyrand; also of Napoleon himself ..".

== Adaptations ==
- 1975 : Une ténébreuse affaire, French telemovie directed by Alain Boudet, starring Robert Bazil, Stéphane Bouy, Thérèse Liotard, Nita Klein and Germaine Delbat.
