= Katsutaro Baba =

Executed Japanese serial killer

- Born: April 2, 1877; Empire of Japan
- Died: June 15, 1908 (aged 31); Tokyo Prison, Shinjuku, Tokyo, Japan
- Cause of death: Execution by hanging
- Conviction: Murder (6 counts)
- Penalty: Death

Details
- Victims: 6
- Span of crimes: 1905–1907
- Country: Japan
- State: Nagano
- Date apprehended: August 1907

Katsutaro Baba (馬場勝太郎, Baba Katsutaro; 1877 – June 1908) was a Japanese serial killer who killed five women and one child in the village of Asahi (present-day Tatsuno, Nagano Prefecture) between 1905 and 1907, ripping out their gallbladders post-mortem. He was convicted, sentenced to death and executed for his crimes in 1908.

== Murders ==
On September 1, 1905, a 16-year-old girl working at a local liquor store went missing during an autumn festival that was held at a shrine in Asahi. It was initially suspected that she might have run off with a man, but that changed nine days later, when she was found dead in a rice field crossing Asahi and a neighboring village. Her corpse had been mutilated with a knife, in particular around the lower abdominal region, and her gallbladder was missing.

Two months later, on November 3, a 30-year-old silk mill worker went missing while another festival was being held celebrating the Emperor's Birthday, simultaneously coinciding with the ongoing construction of Tatsuno Station and the recent victory in the Russo-Japanese War. The woman's body was found along a forest path near the Tenryū River, a few kilometres outside the village, and like the victim two months prior, her body had been mutilated and her gallbladder removed. The similarities between the two crimes prompted fears in the local populace, who feared that a murderer was killing off young women for nefarious purposes.

In August 1906, almost a year after the first murder, the bodies of a 27-year-old woman, her infant son and a 17-year-old housemaid were discovered in their hut. Both female victims had their bellies slit open, with the killer shoving the decapitated infant's body into his mother's abdomen. Taking note of the brutality of the crimes, the examining police detective concluded that the perpetrator was a local who likely extracted organs in order to sell them. Hearing that human organs could be sold for high prices as ingredients for Chinese medicine the same way bear organs were sold at the time, the police hypothesized that the killer was selling the organs for profit.

In late January 1907, a 48-year-old woman disappeared in the vicinity of Asahi, with her mummified body found in a quarry a few kilometres away the following month. Like previous victims, her gallbladder was missing. Facing mounting criticism, the local police chief was dismissed, and measures were undertaken to ban women from going out at night.

In August 1907, a 32-year-old woman was attacked by an unknown assailant who began to strangle her. Thinking quickly, she clasped the man's testicles, which forced him to let go. As it was a moonlit night, the woman was able to recognize the attacker as 30-year-old Katsutaro Baba. Considered an honest and hard-working family man, Baba had moved to Asahi about ten years prior, initially working at a liquor store before he became the independent manager of the local watermill. The next day, after she reported him to the police, Baba was arrested and questioned about the crimes. He confessed to all six murders, and as police had suspected, he claimed to have sold the gallbladders for a high price to a mysterious "merchant from Osaka", who suffered from some sort of fatal illness.

Despite his claims, no such merchant was ever located, and Baba's testimonies became increasingly conflicting and incoherent, with him at one point claiming that a crow would eat the gallbladder if he had left it out to dry at his watermill. In the end, Baba would be convicted for his crimes, sentenced to death, and summarily hanged at the Tokyo Prison in June 1908. No similar attacks took place after his death, and the incident now remains a part of local history.

== See also ==
- List of serial killers by country
