= Antoine Léger (cannibal) =

French cannibal and murderer (1790s–1824)

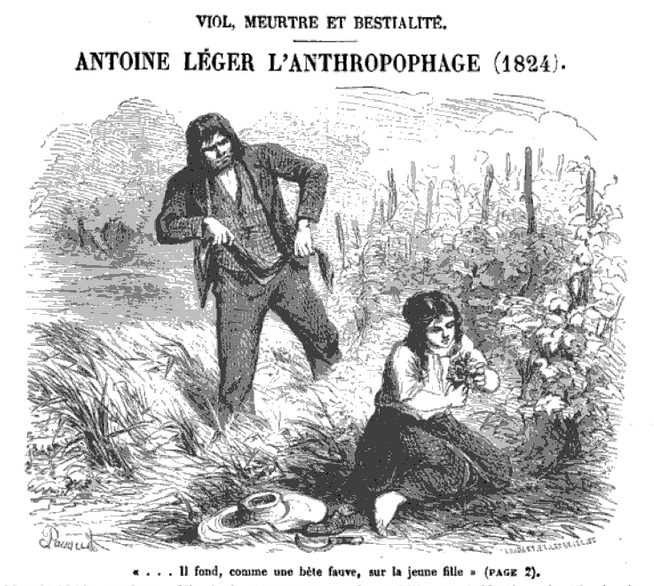
- Antoine Léger prepares to strangle his victim
- Born: 1795–1796; Saint-Martin-Bettencourt, France
- Died: 30 November 1824; Versailles, Yvelines, France
- Cause of death: Execution by guillotine
- Conviction: Murder
- Penalty: Death

Details
- Victims: 1 (Aimée Constance Debully)
- Country: France
- State: Essonne
- Date apprehended: 12 August 1824

Antoine Léger (c. 1795 (Note: His age at the trial was said to be "twenty-eight" or "approaching twenty-nine")– 30 November 1824) was a French cannibal and murderer, convicted for the rape and killing of 12-year-old Aimée Constance Debully, whom he later partially devoured. For this crime, he was later guillotined.

== Biography ==
=== Childhood and adolescence ===
Antoine Léger testified that, from an early age, he avoided socializing with his peers due to his tendency to prefer to be alone.

From the age of 15, he was a barn drummer and played the bassoon in the woods; in 1815, he served in the Soissons garrison.

=== Escape ===
In 1824, on St. John's Day, he left his parents' house to become a hermit, after having made them believe that he was going to work as a domestic servant in Dourdan.

Having given free rein to his desire for isolation, he lived, during the first fortnight, among peasants; at the end of his eight-day, he found a cave near the Charbonnière Rock, located above Moutmiraux, where he spent the rest of the time until his arrest.

== Crime ==
=== Murder of Aimée Constance Debully ===
On 10 August 1824, Léger saw Debully walking by. He then slipped behind her, strangled her with his handkerchief, then carried the corpse into the middle of the woods and committed acts of necrophilia before devouring certain parts of Aimée, notably eating her heart. He then took the corpse to his cave, where he buried it in the sand.

The disappearance of Debully mobilized the population: the peasants searched for her and suspected all foreigners in the area; after five days, a blue and white handkerchief belonging to the victim was discovered. Finally, on 15 August, the entrance to Léger's cave was found, and the smell of the corpse's decomposition led the investigators to the makeshift grave.

=== Arrest ===
Four days before, on 12 August, a cantonal guard saw a suspicious man near a fountain, whom he tried to approach, but failed. He stood guard the next day before the fountain and in the evening, with the help of surrounding peasants, apprehended Léger.

Initially arrested for vagrancy, Antoine claimed to be without parents and an escapee from the Brest Prison, where he claimed to have served a 20-year penal labour sentence.

== Trial, sentence and execution ==
His trial took place on 23 November 1824, at the Versailles cour d'assises. The court ordered, due to the gruesome nature of the crime, that the trial be held in private, despite the wishes of the crowd that had gathered to attend. After initially denying responsibility, Léger decided to confess when questioned by the judge. His lawyer, Mon. Benoît unsuccessfully tried to plead insanity, with his client alleging that he had caught a cold that had temporarily driven him crazy. The jury deliberated for half an hour before finding him guilty of murder, and sentenced Antoine Léger to death.

Antoine Léger was guillotined on 30 November 1824, in Versailles. Following an autopsy, doctors discovered abnormalities in his brain. However, these findings have no scientific value by modern standards and reflect the level of knowledge of that era rather than the real biological causes of his behavior.

== See also ==
- List of incidents of cannibalism

== Notes and references ==
=== Bibliography ===
- L. Lesur, Charles; Ulysse Tencé (1825). Universal Historical Directory for 1824. Vol. 7. Fantin. pp. 811–815. AHU1824.
