= Murder of Gerd Johansson =

1939 child murder in Stockholm, Sweden

Gerd Johansson
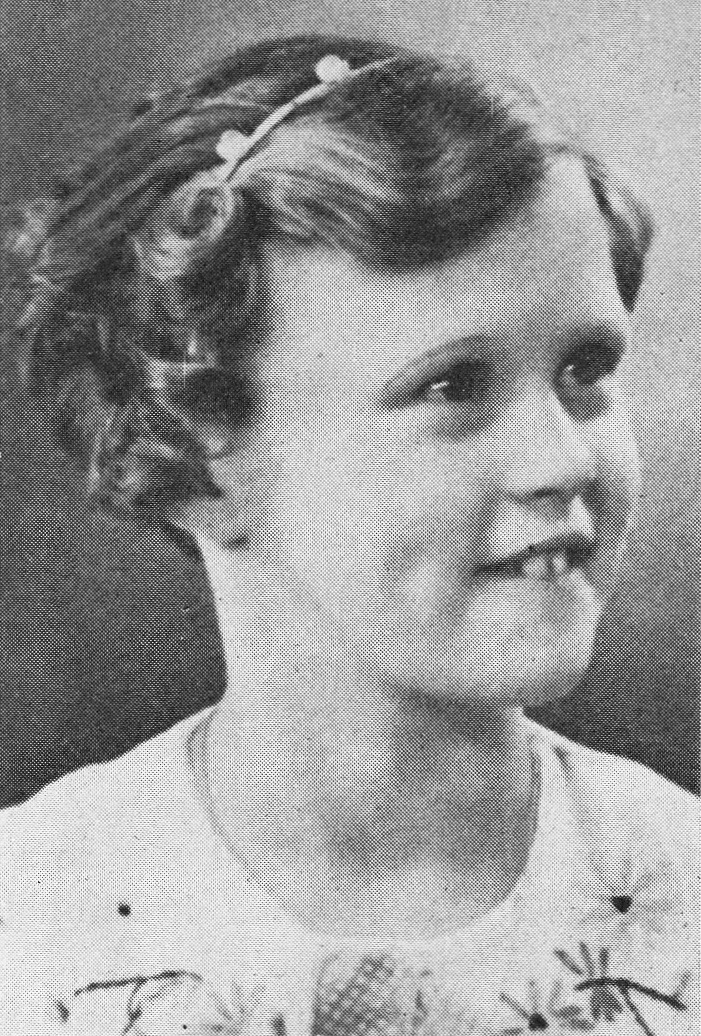
- Born: Gerd Sylvia Margareta Johansson; 27 January 1929; Stockholm, Sweden
- Died: 1 December 1939 (aged 10); Stockholm, Sweden
- Cause of death: Strangulation
- Known for: Controversial murder case

The murder of Gerd Johansson is one of Sweden's most notorious murder cases, concerning the disappearance and murder of a 10-year-old schoolgirl in Stockholm on 1 December 1939. Eight days after her parents had reported her missing her body was discovered in Lötsjön a lake in Sundbyberg; she had been raped and strangled to death. News media was filled with reports of the murder and her playmate Jan Sparring was interviewed by several media; Sparring later became a known singer in Sweden. A month after her body was discovered, media reported that her killer must have a dog and that jute fibers had been found on her coat. Police also stated that they were searching for a black car in connection with her murder.

== Arrest and conviction ==
Soon a 33-year-old man, Olle Möller, was arrested and interrogated. Möller, who was born in Michigan in the United States and had moved to Sweden at a young age, was a known athlete in Stockholm. On 17 January 1940 Möller was released by the police and the newspaper Aftonbladet set a 10,000 kronor reward for any tips that would lead to Johansson's killer being arrested. In December 1940, Möller was once again arrested and this time he was prosecuted and on 7 March 1940 he was sentenced to ten years hard labour for "attempted rape and assault with death occurring". Möller appealed his sentence, but his sentence was upheld in two more appeals and, on 26 June 1942, his sentence was finalised. However, over the following years the trial received a lot of criticism and accusations of false testaments, with rewards for those who testified against Möller. In 1984, one of the witnesses against Möller at his trial revealed that they had falsely testified that they saw Möller with Gerd Johansson.

== Release from prison, new charge, and aftermath ==
Möller was released from prison on 11 September 1948, after serving six years of hard labour. Möller was later sentenced once again, this time for the murder of Rut Lind in 1959.

After Möller's death in 1983, his daughter continued to fight for her father to be officially acquitted of Gerd Johansson's murder. She took her claim to court that her father should be officially acquitted of the 1939 murder, because of witness confessions of untrue testimony in court. Her claim was denied by the supreme court of Stockholm on 24 May 1985. In 1998, a DNA test was made on the clothes of Gerd Johansson, but no certain results could be determined.

Olle Möller och orättvisan was a book released in 2010 by Henry Sidoli, covering the murder case. In 2012, the book Mördaren i folkhemmet by Lena Ebervall and Per E Samuelson was released about the Johansson murder case. Möller himself released a book in 1966 called Jag är oskyldig (I am innocent) about the case.

== See also ==
- List of solved missing person cases
