= Olle Möller =

Swedish athlete and murderer (1906–1983)

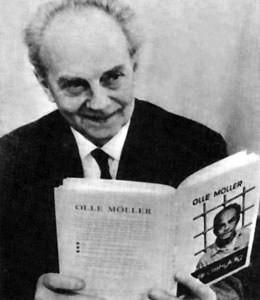
- Olle Möller at the release of his book Jag är oskyldig (I am innocent!) in 1966

Personal information
- Nationality: Swedish
- Born: 20 April 1906 Michigan, United States
- Died: 22 March 1983 (aged 76) Örebro, Sweden

Sport
- Event: 10,000 m

Achievements and titles
- Personal best: 10,000 m – 31:46.8 (1933)

Olof Manfred "Olle" Möller (20 April 1906 – 22 March 1983) was a Swedish-American long-distance runner, who was also convicted for the 1939 murder of Gerd Johansson and the 1959 murder of Rut Lind.

Möller won about ten national titles in cross country running events between 1928 and 1939.

== Bibliography ==
- Möller, Olle (1966). Jag är oskyldig! [I am innocent!] (in Swedish). Malmö: Kristallförlaget. SELIBR 196700.
