= Råstasjön =

Lake in Solna Municipality, Sweden

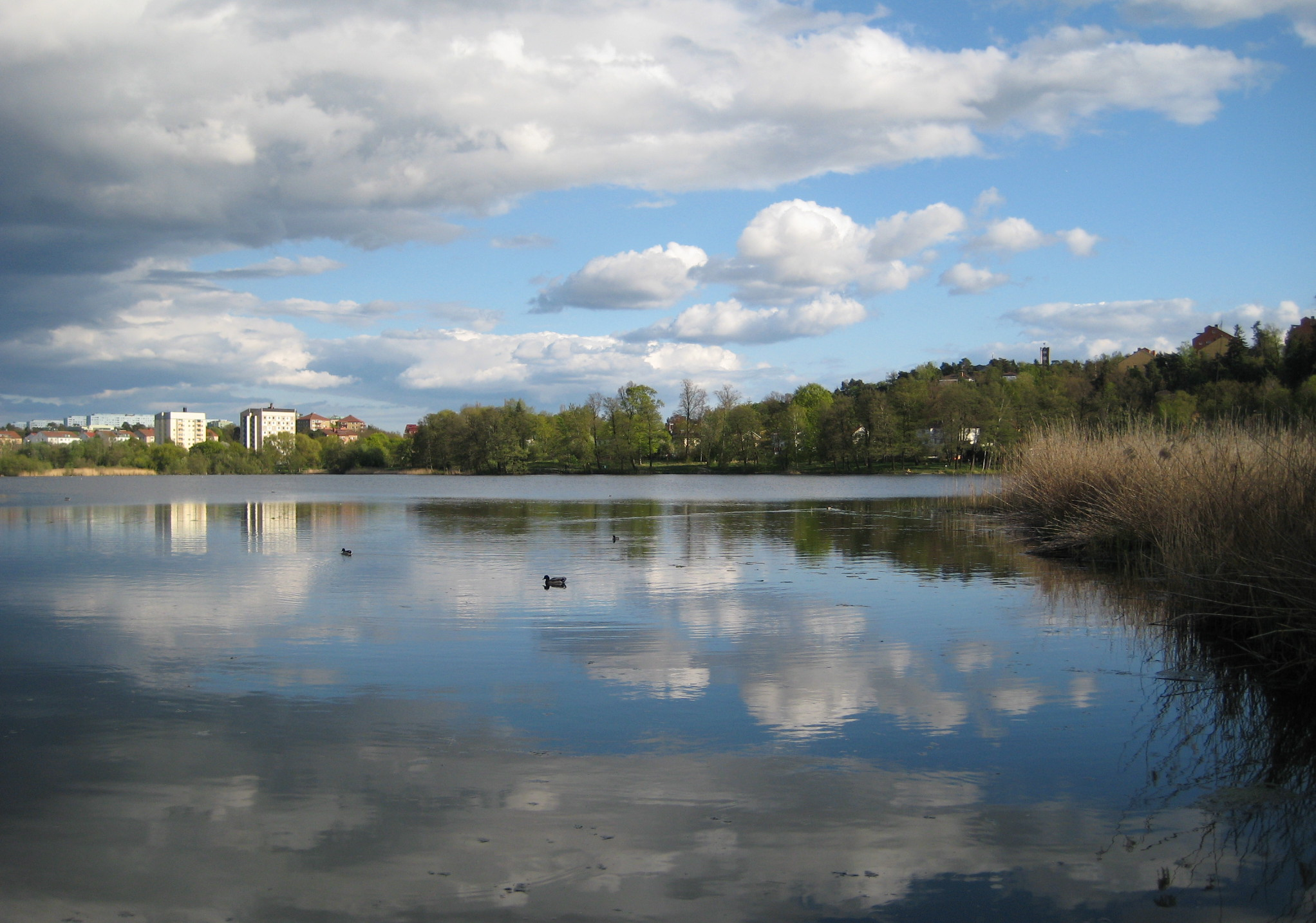

- Location within Stockholm
- Location: Solna Municipality
- Coordinates: 59°22′20″N 17°59′20″E
- Basin countries: Sweden
- Max. depth: 4.3 metres (14 ft)

Råstasjön is a lake next to the Strawberry Arena in Solna north of Stockholm, Sweden. On the lake, the 1912 final of the Swedish national bandy championship took place. A promenade of 2.1 km length leads around the lake. Råstasjön is connected to the lake Lötsjön by a small stream, which makes them twin lakes.

Fishing is not allowed.
