= Nationalarenan =

Association football stadium in Solna, Stockholm, Sweden

Nationalarenan Strawberry Arena
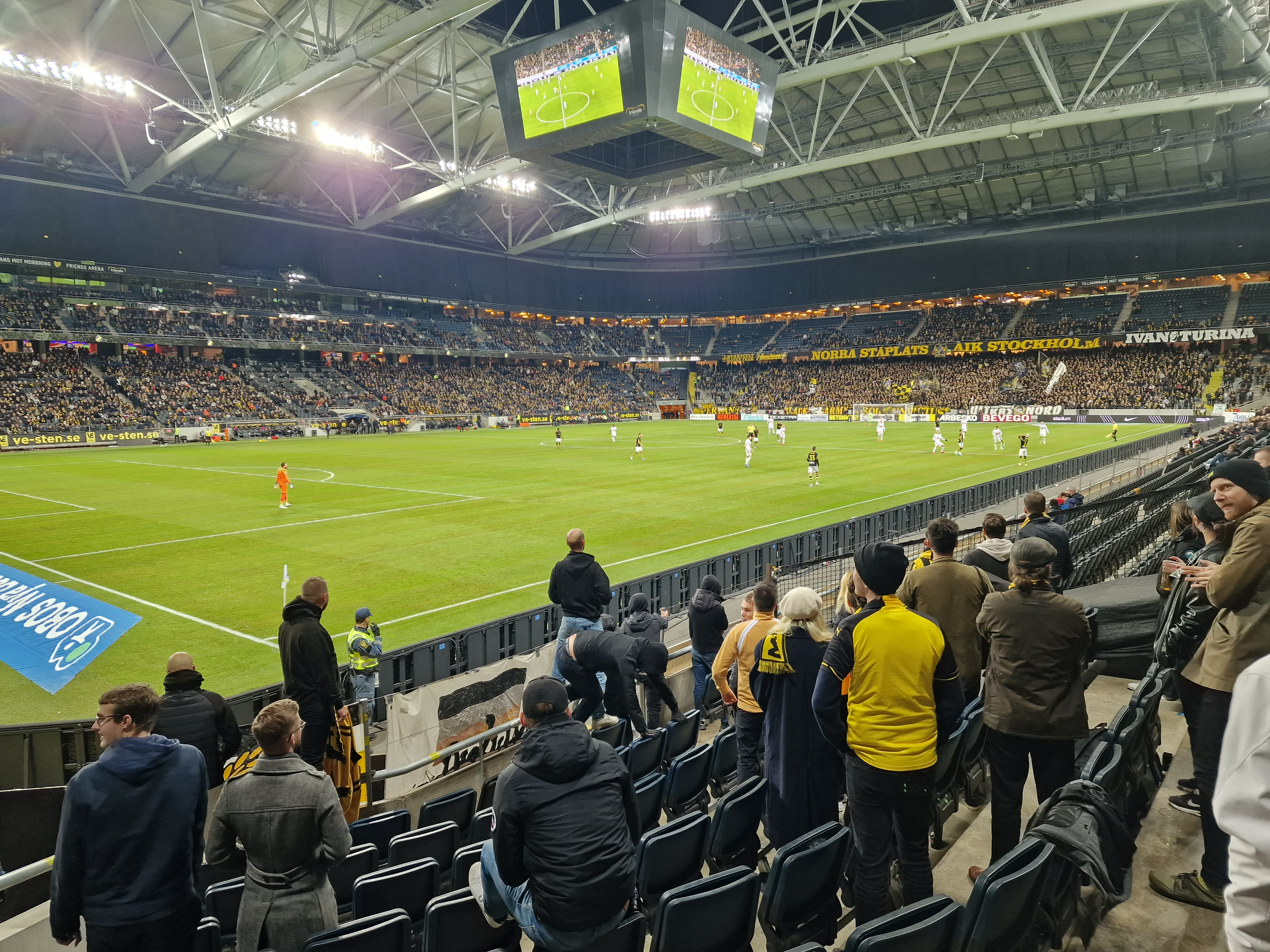
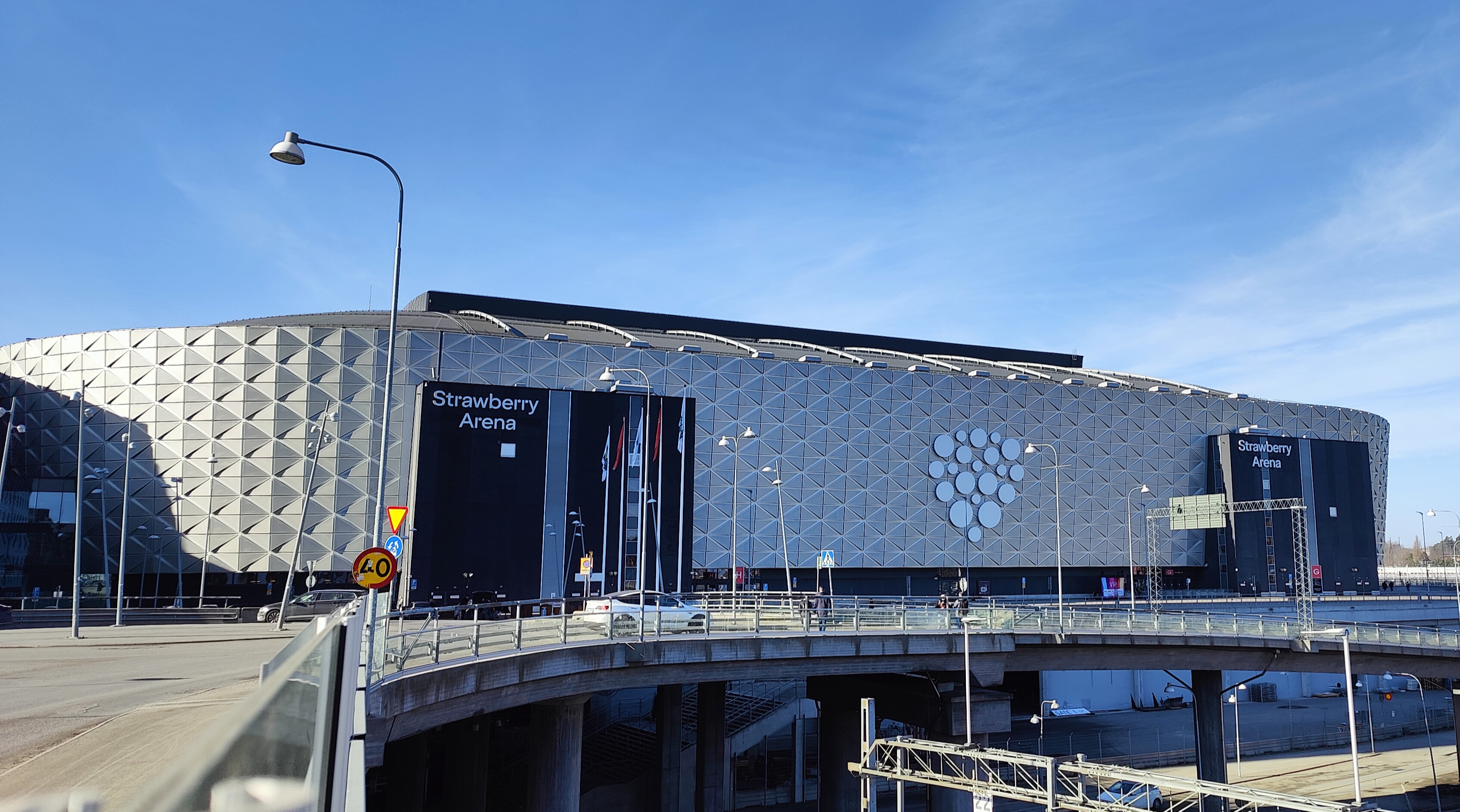
- UEFA
- Interactive map of Nationalarenan; Strawberry Arena
- Full name: Strawberry Arena
- Former names: Swedbank Arena (2009–2012); Friends Arena (2012–2024)
- Address: Stockholm; Sweden
- Location: Solna, Stockholm, Sweden
- Coordinates: 59°22′21″N 18°00′00″E
- Owner: Swedish Football Association, Folksam, Solna Municipality, Jernhusen, Peab, Fabege
- Capacity: 50,000 (national capacity); 65,000 (concerts)
- Executive suites: 92
- Roof: Retractable
- Surface: Grass
- Record attendance: 60,243 (Taylor Swift, The Eras Tour, 19 May 2024); 51,049 (Sweden–Bosnia and Herzegovina, 14 November 2026)

Construction
- Groundbreaking: 7 December 2009
- Built: 2009–2012
- Opened: 15 October 2012
- Cost: 2.8 billion SEK (€ 300 million)
- Architects: Arkitekterna Krook & Tjäder, Berg Arkitektkontor, Populous
- Main contractor: Peab

Tenants
- Sweden men's national football team (2012–present); AIK Fotboll (2013–present); Melodifestivalen final (2013–2020, 2022–present)

Nationalarenan, known as Strawberry Arena since 2024 for sponsorship reasons, is a retractable roof multi-purpose stadium in Stockholm, Sweden. Located next to the lake Råstasjön in Solna, just north of the City Centre, it is the largest stadium in Scandinavia. Since its opening, the venue has served as Sweden's national stadium for men's football, hence the name Nationalarenan.

The main tenants of the stadium are Sweden's men's national football team and Allsvenskan football club AIK; both relocated from their previous home at the Råsunda Stadium. The venue has a total capacity of 65,000 at concerts and 50,000 seated at football matches, but the stadium can be scaled down to provide for smaller events with approximately 20,000 guests. The arena is designed by Danish C.F. Møller Architects.

65,000 at concerts would require a small stage. The record attendance is just over 60,000. The record attendance for football is slightly over 50,000 for a club league match; for these matches, standing spectators are allowed.

== History ==
Initially there were plans to build a new national stadium close to the indoor venue Ericsson Globe in Johanneshov in southern Stockholm, but on 1 April 2006 the Swedish Football Association (SvFF) made the decision to build the new stadium in Solna. It was calculated to cost around 1.9 billion kronor (202 million euro) to complete. The estimated cost before construction had begun was 2.3 billion kronor. It replaced Råsunda Stadium, Sweden's former national arena for football. Råsunda was torn down and replaced by some 700 flats and office buildings.

Swedbank acquired the naming rights to the stadium in a 153 million kronor (about 20.5 million euro) deal that would last until 2023. While the arena was originally to be known as Swedbank Arena, Swedbank announced in 2012 that it would donate its naming rights to Friends, a nonprofit organization against school bullying of which Swedbank is a sponsor. Consequently, the stadium was renamed Friends Arena.

On January 13, 2024, a naming rights sponsorship agreement was reached with the Norwegian hotel company Strawberry. The new name, "Strawberry Arena", took effect on July 12, 2024.

== Structure and facilities ==
The stadium has a retractable roof, enabling events to take place during the winter season and to host indoor entertainment shows. The facade of the arena can be lit up in 17 million different color schemes. For example, the stadium is lit up in blue and yellow when Sweden's national team is playing matches. Nationalarenan is a UEFA Category 4 stadium, and the natural turf pitch measures 105 x 68 metres. In the middle of the stadium roof, a 240 square metres big media cube is placed where the attendance can follow what is happening. In addition, 647 LED-screens are installed throughout the facility to enhance the guest experience.

== Events ==
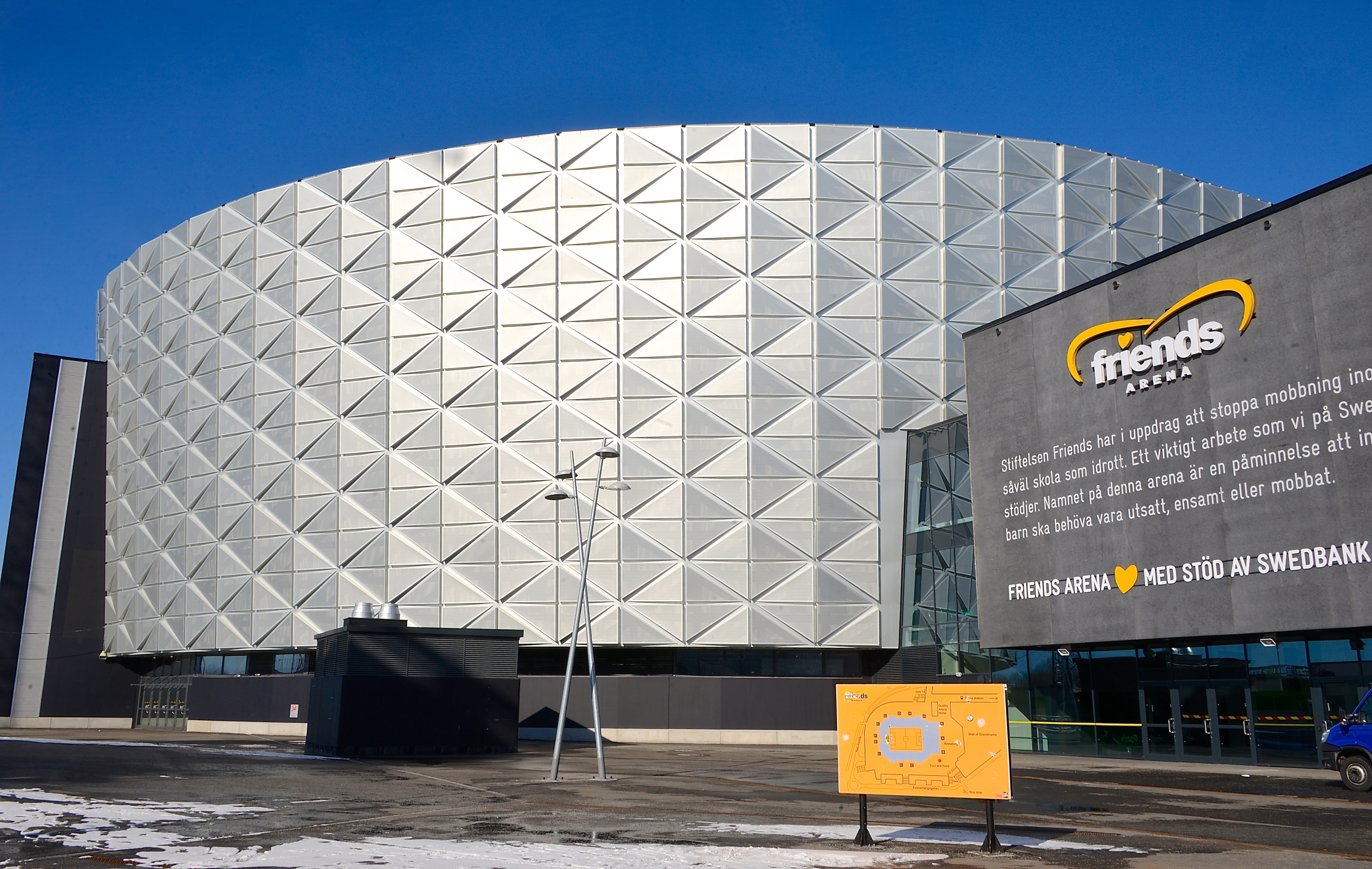
Exterior

Crown Princess Victoria of Sweden declared the arena inaugurated at the opening ceremony, which took place in the venue on 27 October 2012. The show, directed by famous Swedish director Colin Nutley, was entitled Svenska ögonblick (Swedish Moments). Popular Swedish artists as Agnes Carlsson, The Hives, Icona Pop, two-times Eurovision Song Contest winner Loreen, First Aid Kit and Roxette performed in front of a crowd of 46,000 people. Furthermore, 1,700,000 TV viewers watched the inauguration show live at SVT1.

Swedish House Mafia made three concerts during their One Last Tour in the arena. A total of approximately 115,000 people visited Nationalarenan during the three sold-out concerts in November 2012.

On 14 November 2012, the stadium hosted its first football game. Zlatan Ibrahimović scored the first goal at Sweden's new national stadium in the 4–2 victory against England. The game was seen by 49,967 people, which until 2017 was the attendance record for a sport event.

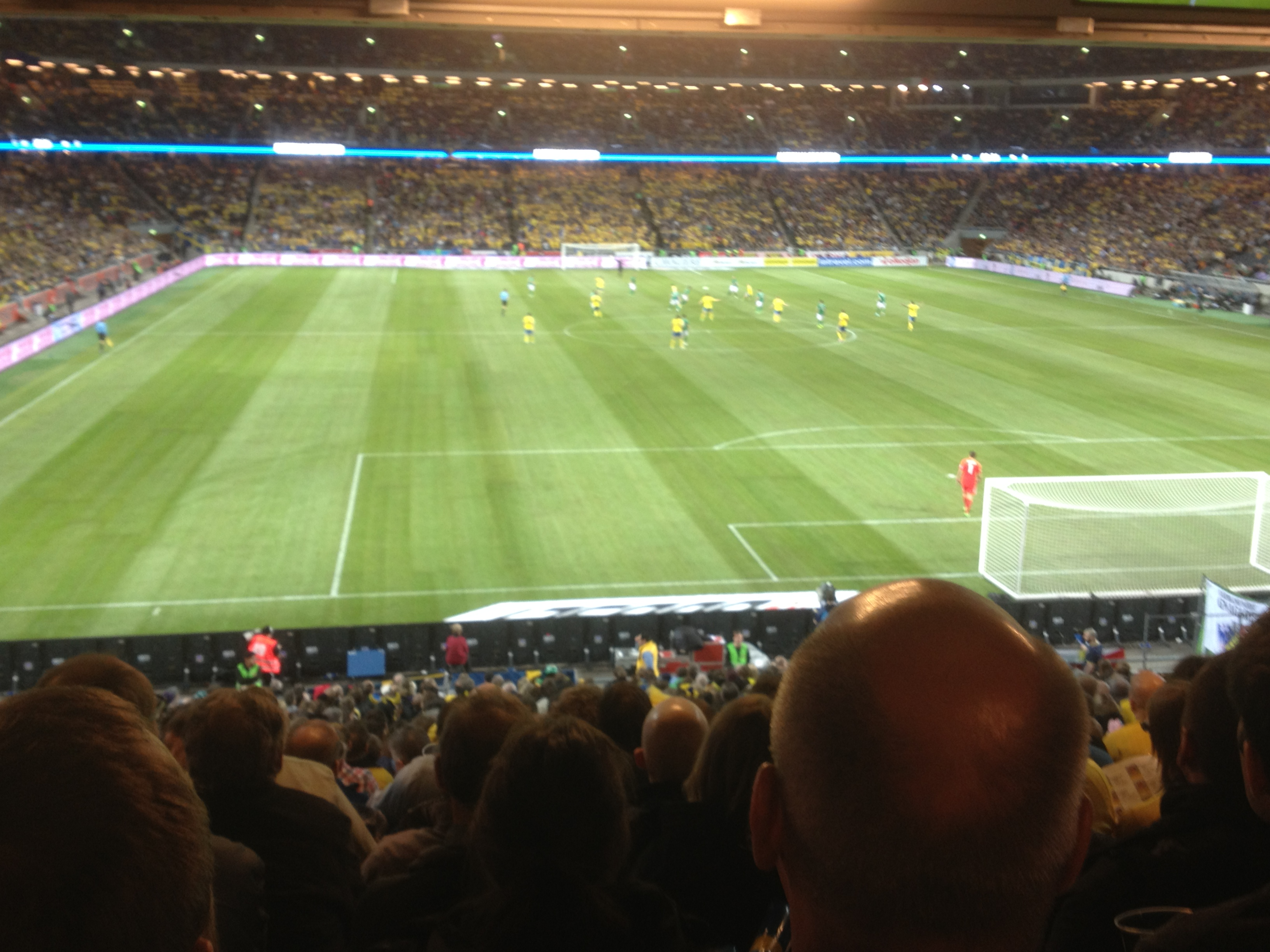
Sweden vs Republic of Ireland, 22 March 2013

A new record for Swedish bandy was set at the 2013 Swedish Bandy Championship Final, when Hammarby IF defeated Sandvikens AIK ahead of an audience of 38,474 persons under the closed roof.

AIK played their first competitive football match on 7 April 20

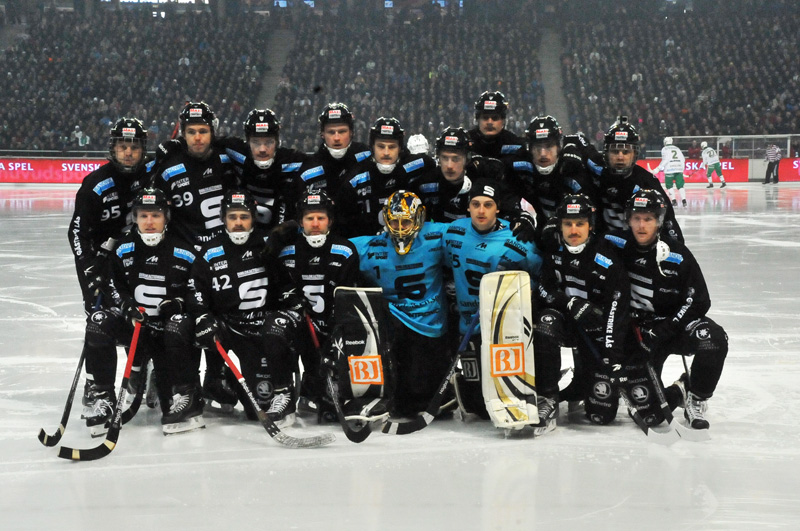
Sandvikens AIK players pose before the 2013 Swedish men's national bandy championship final game.

On 28 July 2013, the final of the UEFA Women's Euro were played. 41,301 people watched Germany overcome Norway with a score of 1–0. The game set a new attendance record for a Women's Euro fixture. Solna became also the first city in Europe which has hosted all four big football championships (FIFA World Cup, FIFA Women's World Cup, UEFA European Championship and UEFA Women's Championship). The arena also hosted Motorcycle speedway as part of the Speedway Grand Prix World Championship series and held the Speedway Grand Prix of Scandinavia from 2013 to 2017. The temporary track at the arena was 275 metres (301 yards) in length.

The arena has also hosted the final of Melodifestivalen every year since 2013, with the exception of 2021 due to the COVID-19 pandemic. In 2022, the arena also hosted the fourth heat and the semi-final of that year's competition. The stadium was chosen as the venue for the 2017 UEFA Europa League Final.

== Concerts ==
Concerts at Friends Arena
Date	Artist	Event	Attendance	Revenue
22 November 2012	Swedish House Mafia	One Last Tour	–	–
23 November 2012	Swedish House Mafia	One Last Tour	–	–
24 November 2012	Swedish House Mafia	One Last Tour	–	–
3 May 2013	Bruce Springsteen and the E Street Band	Wrecking Ball World Tour	169,325 / 169,325	$17,932,099
4 May 2013	Bruce Springsteen and the E Street Band	Wrecking Ball World Tour	169,325 / 169,325	$17,932,099
8 May 2013	One Direction	Take Me Home Tour	29,723 / 29,723	$1,783,380
11 May 2013	Bruce Springsteen and the E Street Band	Wrecking Ball World Tour	—	—
1 June 2013	Kiss	Monster World Tour	—	—
13 July 2013	Iron Maiden	Maiden England World Tour	55,531 / 55,531	$5,001,410
22 November 2013	Black Sabbath	Black Sabbath Reunion Tour	—	—
13 December 2013	Elton John	The Diving Board Tour	—	—
13 June 2014	One Direction	Where We Are Tour	88,978 / 88,978	$7,358,040
14 June 2014	One Direction	Where We Are Tour	88,978 / 88,978	$7,358,040
28 June 2014	Pearl Jam	Lightning Bolt Tour	—	—
19 July 2015	AC/DC	Rock or Bust World Tour	—	—
19 March 2016	Simple Minds	Big Music Tour + Greatest Hits 2016	—	—
3 July 2016	Coldplay	A Head Full of Dreams Tour	53,575 / 53,575	$3,970,140
9 July 2016	Black Sabbath	The End Tour	—	—
26 July 2016	Beyoncé	The Formation World Tour	48,519 / 48,519	$3,937,498
5 May 2017	Depeche Mode	Global Spirit Tour	36,400 / 36,400	$2,734,164
8 May 2017	Ariana Grande	Dangerous Woman Tour	14,106 / 14,106	$995,461
29 June 2017	Guns N' Roses	Not in This Lifetime... Tour	53,654 / 53,654	$4,460,555
12 October 2017	The Rolling Stones	No Filter Tour	53,770 / 53,770	$7,880,697
21 November 2017	Queen + Adam Lambert	Queen + Adam Lambert Tour 2017–2018	—	—
25 June 2018	Beyoncé Jay-Z	On the Run II Tour	46,647 / 46,647	$4,610,554
2 July 2018	Eminem	Revival Tour	—	—
14 July 2018	Ed Sheeran	÷ Tour	54,234 / 54,234	$4,818,972
31 July 2018	Justin Timberlake	The Man of the Woods Tour	23,303 / 23,303	$1,818,015
18 August 2018	Roger Waters	Us + Them Tour	19,043 / 19,238	$1,782,758
12 June 2019	Phil Collins	Not Dead Yet Tour	—	—
17 October 2019	Cher	Here We Go Again Tour	27,025 / 27,025	$2,274,898
5 December 2019	Avicii Tribute Concert	Tim Bergling Foundation - Concert for Mental Health Awareness	58,163 / 58,163	—
21 July 2022	Lady Gaga	The Chromatica Ball	34,934 / 34,934	$3,540,732
31 July 2022	The Rolling Stones	Sixty	50,889 / 50,889	$6,916,424
10 May 2023	Beyoncé	Renaissance World Tour	90,169 / 90,169	$9,802,155
11 May 2023	Beyoncé	Renaissance World Tour	90,169 / 90,169	$9,802,155
23 May 2023	Depeche Mode	Memento Mori World Tour	43,876 / 46,816	$3,656,147
17 May 2024	Taylor Swift	The Eras Tour	178,679 / 178,679	
18 May 2024	Taylor Swift	The Eras Tour	178,679 / 178,679	
19 May 2024	Taylor Swift	The Eras Tour	178,679 / 178,679	
15 July 2024	Bruce Springsteen & E Street Band	Springsteen and E Street Band 2023–2025 Tour	108,202 / 108,202	
18 July 2024	Bruce Springsteen & E Street Band	Springsteen and E Street Band 2023–2025 Tour	108,202 / 108,202	
25 July 2024	Pink	Pink Summer Carnival		
4 July 2025	Guns N' Roses	Because What You Want & What You Get Are Two Completely Different Things Tour		
22 August 2025	Ed Sheeran	+–=÷× Tour		
23 August 2025	Ed Sheeran	+–=÷× Tour		
12 June 2026	Foo Fighters	Take Cover Tour		
10 July 2026	Bad Bunny	Debí Tirar Más Fotos World Tour		
11 July 2026	Bad Bunny	Debí Tirar Más Fotos World Tour		
8 August 2026	The Weeknd	After Hours til Dawn Tour		
9 August 2026	The Weeknd	After Hours til Dawn Tour		
10 August 2026	The Weeknd	After Hours til Dawn Tour		

== Points of interest ==
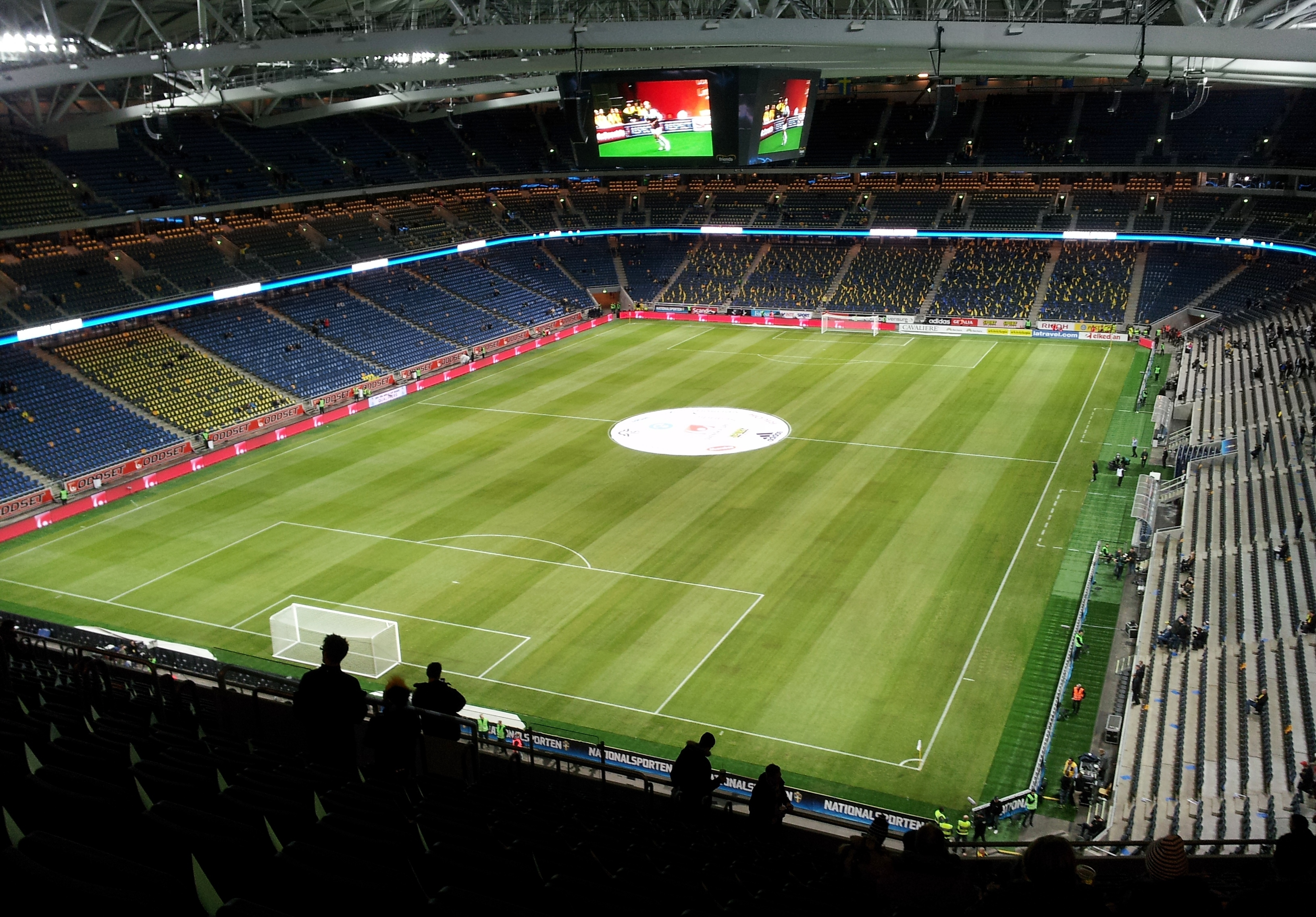
Interior

The stadium is located a 700-metre (800-yard) walk from the Solna commuter train station, where the Tvärbanan tramway and local buses are also available (a slightly longer walk away). Slightly further away (1.4 km, 0.9 mi) the Näckrosen metro station is found. The 18th meridian east runs through Nationalarenan. By 2028 there will be another metro station, Arenastaden metro station 800m away. There are two boards informing that the eighteenth meridian has passed through this point, at the entrance B and F.

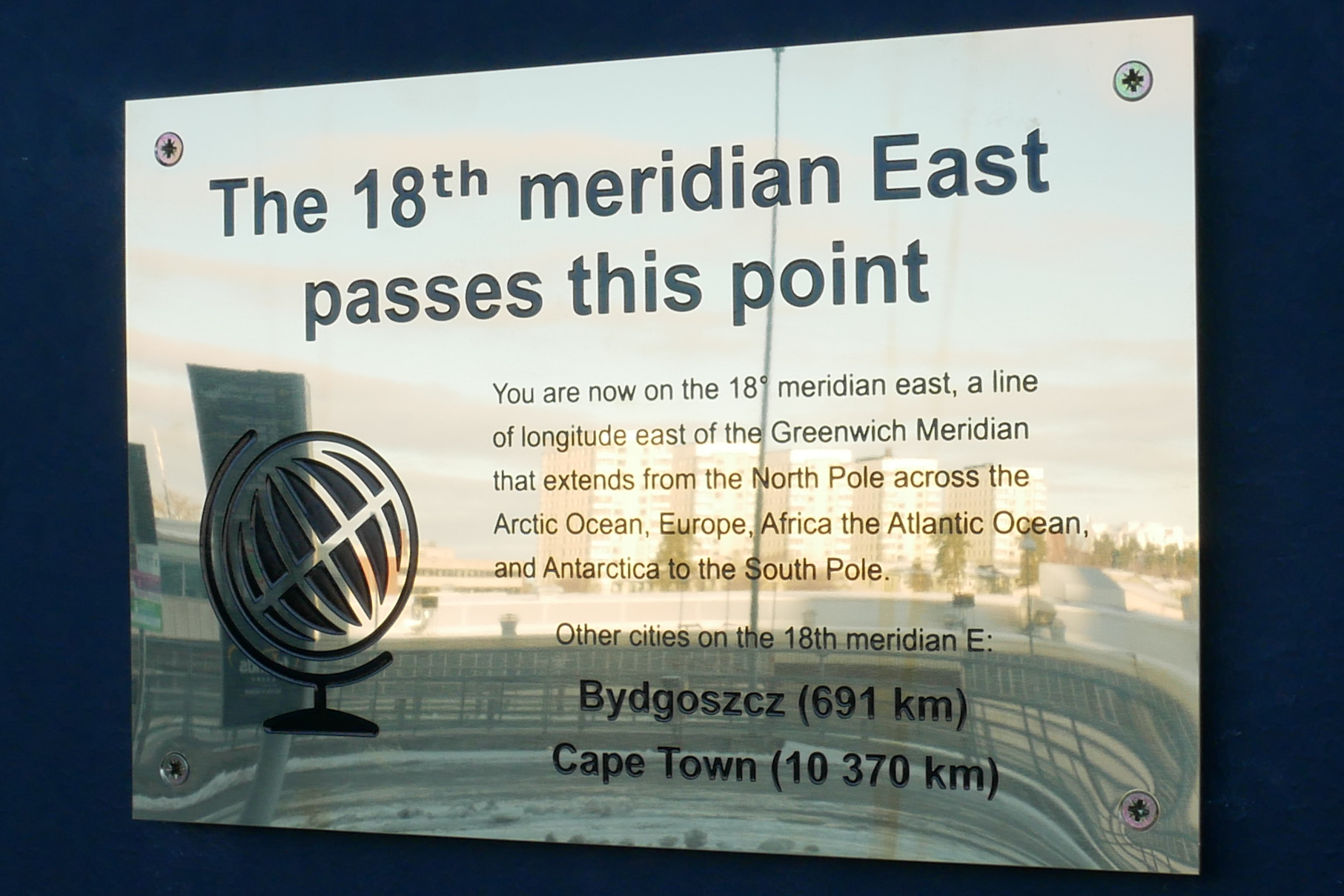
Plaque marking the passage of the eighteenth meridian

The arena, located about six km (3.7 miles) from Stockholm Central Station, has parking for 300 charter buses and 4,000 cars. Along with the stadium, there will also be built a number of hotels with a total of approximately 400 rooms, restaurants for 8,000 guests, office areas for 10,000 employees, conference/exhibition centres and 2,000 flats. Moreover, a shopping mall, Mall of Scandinavia, with 240 shops and a multi screen cinema, opened near the stadium in 2015. The mall is the biggest shopping centre in Sweden.

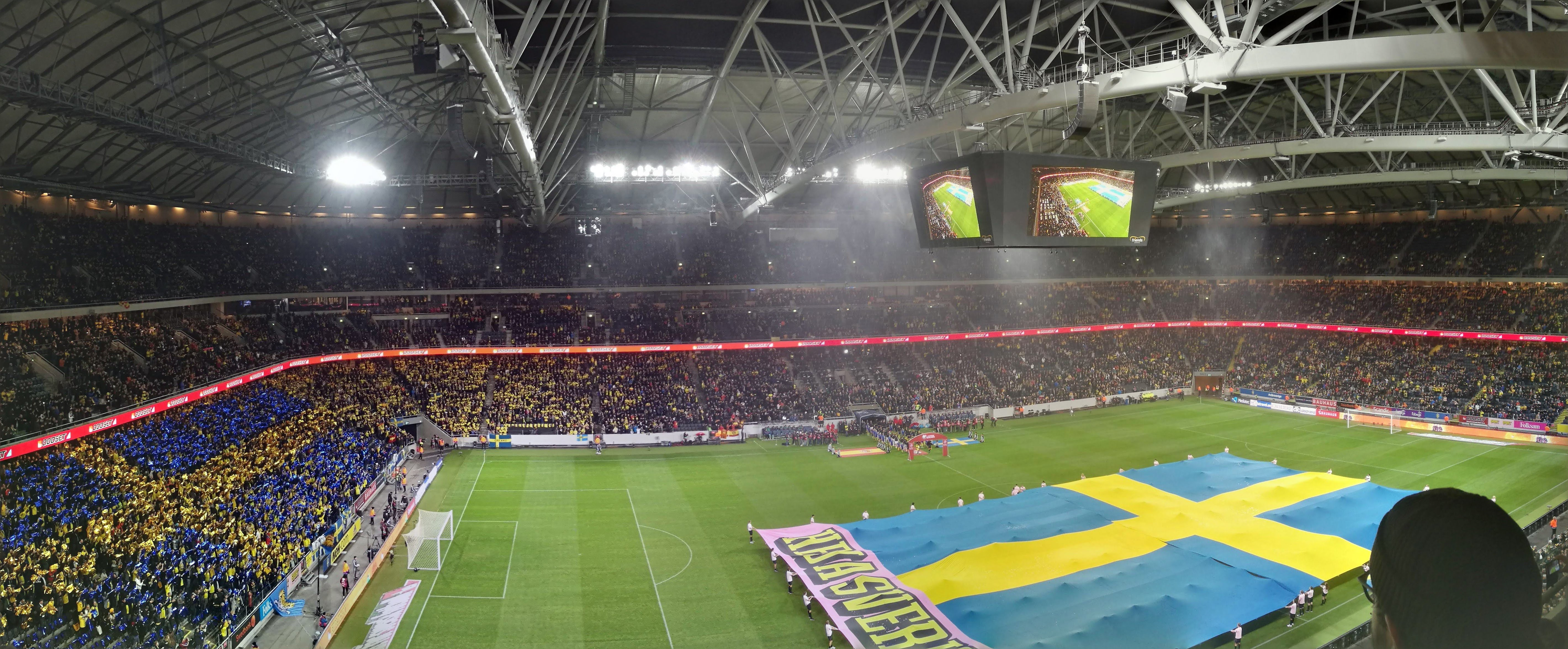
Friends Arena before Sweden vs. Spain, 15 October 2019

The total project was calculated to cost more than 4 billion SEK.

== Football average attendances ==
Season	Sweden national team				AIK			
Season	Games	Season Average	Highest Gate	Lowest Gate	Games	Season Average	Highest Gate	Lowest Gate
2012	1	49,967	49,967 vs England	49,967 vs England				
2013	7	41,973	49,766 vs Portugal	13,438 vs Norway	15	18,900	43,466 vs Syrianska FC	9,388 vs Östers IF
2014	4	27,926	49,023 vs Russia	15,421 vs Estonia	15	16,446	30,650 vs IFK Göteborg	11,408 vs Falkenbergs FF
2015	5	34,925	49,053 vs Denmark	25,351 vs Montenegro	15	20,983	43,713 vs IFK Göteborg	10,701 vs Falkenbergs FF
2016	4	28,581	37,942 vs Wales	18,475 vs Czech Republic	15	16,431	30,843 vs Hammarby IF	8,507 vs BK Häcken
2017	4	44,810	50,022 vs Luxembourg	31,243 vs Belarus	15	17,807	33,157 vs Djurgårdens IF	10,342 vs Halmstads BK
2018	5	28,325	48,134 vs Chile	9,876 vs Slovakia	15	23,671	50,128 vs GIF Sundsvall	12,781 vs IF Brommapojkarna
2019	5	32,863	48,134 vs Spain	19,737 vs Slovakia	15	18,970	45,367 vs Djurgårdens IF	11,131 vs BK Häcken
2020	3	0			15	0		
2021	8	15,238	47,314 vs Greece	500 vs Armenia	15	12,364	42,539 vs Djurgårdens IF	8 vs Mjällby AIF
2022	4	34,492	48,628 vs Czech Republic	22,895 vs Slovenia	15	25,275	45,117 vs Hammarby IF	15,112 vs Varbergs BoIS
2023	6	26,337	49,296 vs Belgium	10,097 vs Moldova	15	25,739	41,327 vs Djurgårdens IF	19,164 vs Varbergs BoIS
2024	5	25,250	46,956 vs Serbia	10,127 vs Azerbaijan	15	28,589	47,129 vs Hammarby IF	18,054 vs IFK Värnamo
2025	4	26,293	50,151 vs Switzerland	14,147 vs Northern Ireland	15	30,023	47,727 vs Hammarby IF	20,331 vs IFK Värnamo
2026	5	39,267	51,049 vs Bosnia and Herzegovina	24,637 vs Poland	15	29,022	47,374 vs Hammarby IF	18,695 vs BK Häcken

== See also ==
- List of indoor arenas
- List of indoor arenas in Nordic countries
- List of football stadiums in Sweden
- Lists of stadiums
- Climate Pledge Arena, an indoor arena in Seattle, Washington, US that received its name via a similar donation of naming rights
- Kentucky Proud Park, a baseball park in Lexington, Kentucky, US that received its name via a similar donation of naming rights

Preceded by Olympic Stadium; Helsinki	UEFA Women's Championship; Final venue 2013	Succeeded by De Grolsch Veste; Enschede
Preceded by St. Jakob Park; Basel	UEFA Europa League; Final venue 2017	Succeeded by Parc Olympique Lyonnais; Lyon
