= Lötsjön =

Lake in Sundbyberg Municipality, Sweden

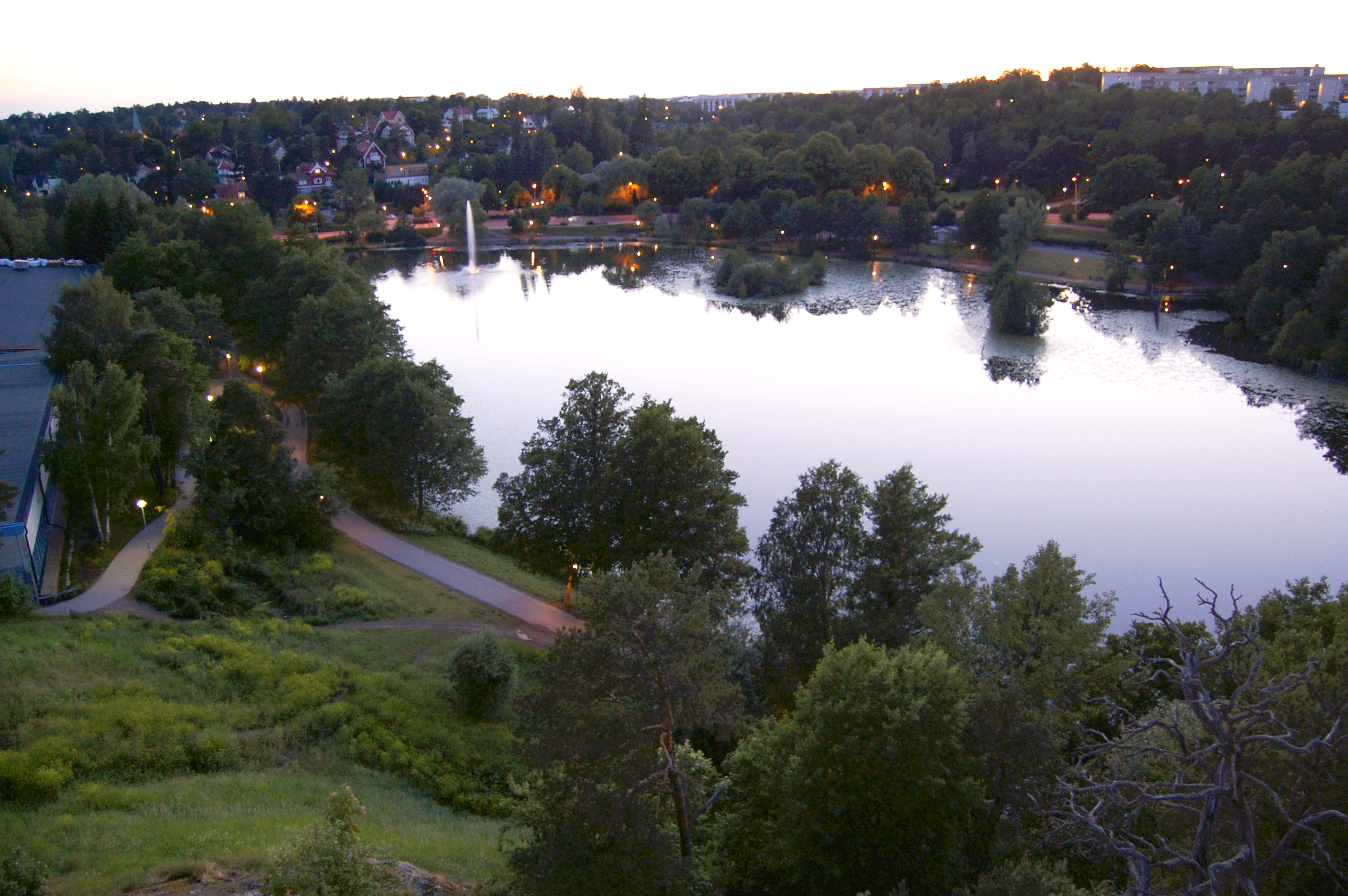

- Location within Stockholm
- Location: Sundbyberg, Stockholm County
- Coordinates: 59°22′18″N 17°58′0″E
- Basin countries: Sweden

Lötsjön is a small lake in Sundbyberg, a municipality north of Stockholm, Sweden. The shallow lake features a rich variety of water birds and a fountain. A promenade of approx. 1.4km length leads around Lötsjön.

Swimming in the lake is prohibited.

The lake Råstasjön is located in close proximity to the east of Lötsjön.

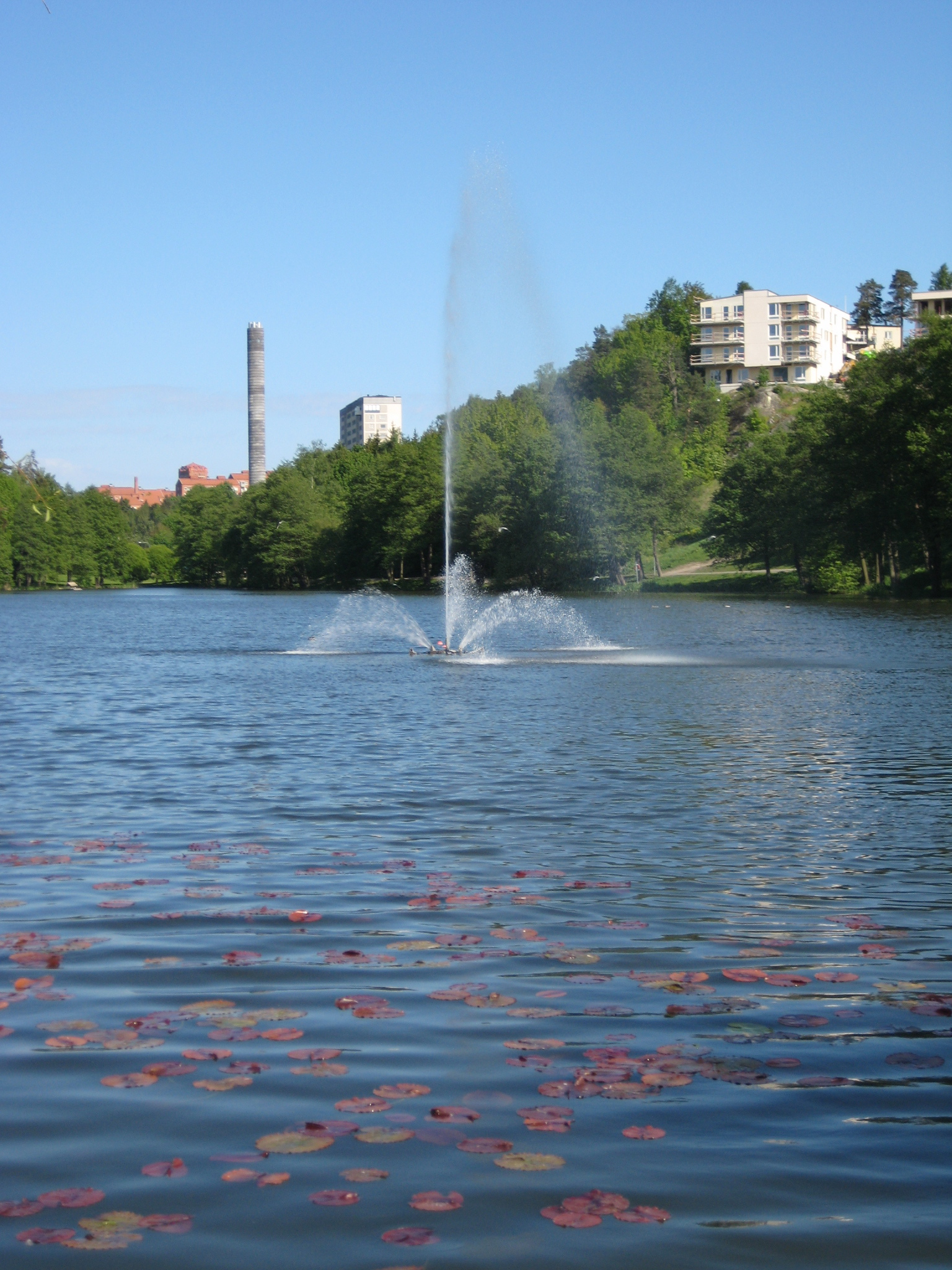
Lötsjön's fountain
