= Gesellschaft der Ärzte in Wien =

Austrian medical society

Gesellschaft der Ärzte in Wien (College of Physicians in Vienna) is a medical society with a long-standing tradition in Austria. Its principal task is the continuing education of medical practitioners. The society's headquarter is the Billrothhaus in the 9th district of Vienna.

The organization's main task is the education of medics and the presentation of new scientific findings in the field of medicine. For this purpose, the Gesellschaft der Ärzte organizes scientific events, runs a library and publishes educational videos.

After the incumbent President Helmut Sinzinger has died in early 2020, Beatrix Volc-Platzer was elected as the first female President of the College of Physicians in Vienna in October 2020.

== History ==
=== Early stages ===
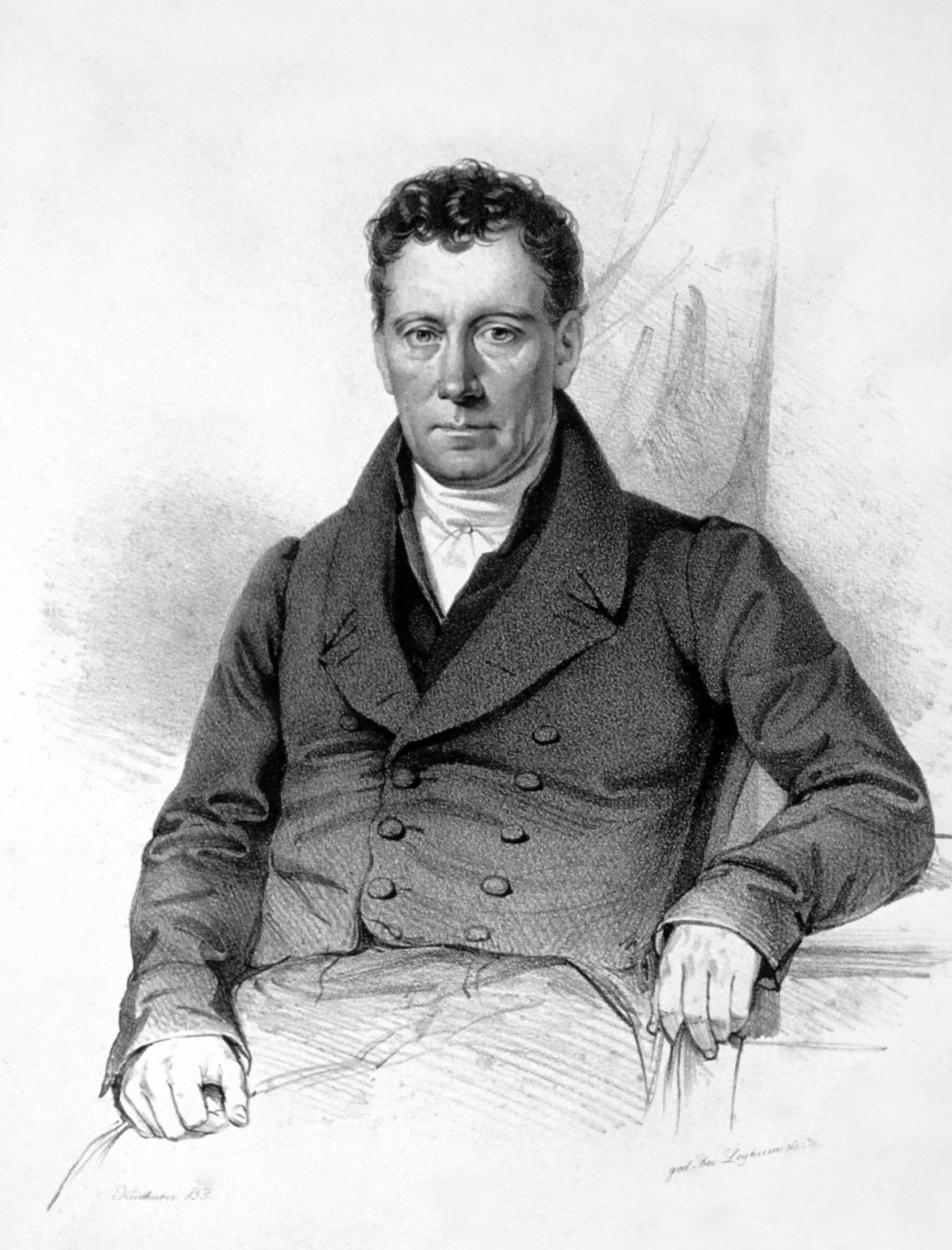
Franz Wirer

35 years prior to the foundation of the Gesellschaft der Ärzte in Wien, young physicians met to discuss relevant scientific information. These meetings were the basis for the society's formation.

The Ärztevereinigung (physician's club) was founded in 1802 by Johann Anton Heidmann (1775–1855). Its members subscribed to medical journals then passed them on to other members. The scientific results where discussed during weekly meetings in the apartment of Dr. Heidmann and, after 1804, that of Dr. Malfatti. Other famous members of the club were Ludwig Freiherr von Türkheim, Franz Wirer and Johann Friedrich Osiander. This association published a yearly journal, the Gesundheitstaschenbuch (Health Manual). The Ärzteforum (physicians' forum) was founded in the early 1830s and had very renowned medics amongst its members, including Ignaz Rudolf Bischoff, university professor at the Josephinum in Vienna, Johann Hassinger, who later was deemed surgeon general, Heinrich Herzfelder, later the Chief Physician in the Israelite Hospital, Ludwig Wilhelm Mauthner von Mauthstein, founder of St. Anna children's hospital and the first professor of pediatrics, as well as the practicing physician Rudolph von Vivenot.

=== Beginnings of the Gesellschaft der Ärzte in Wien ===
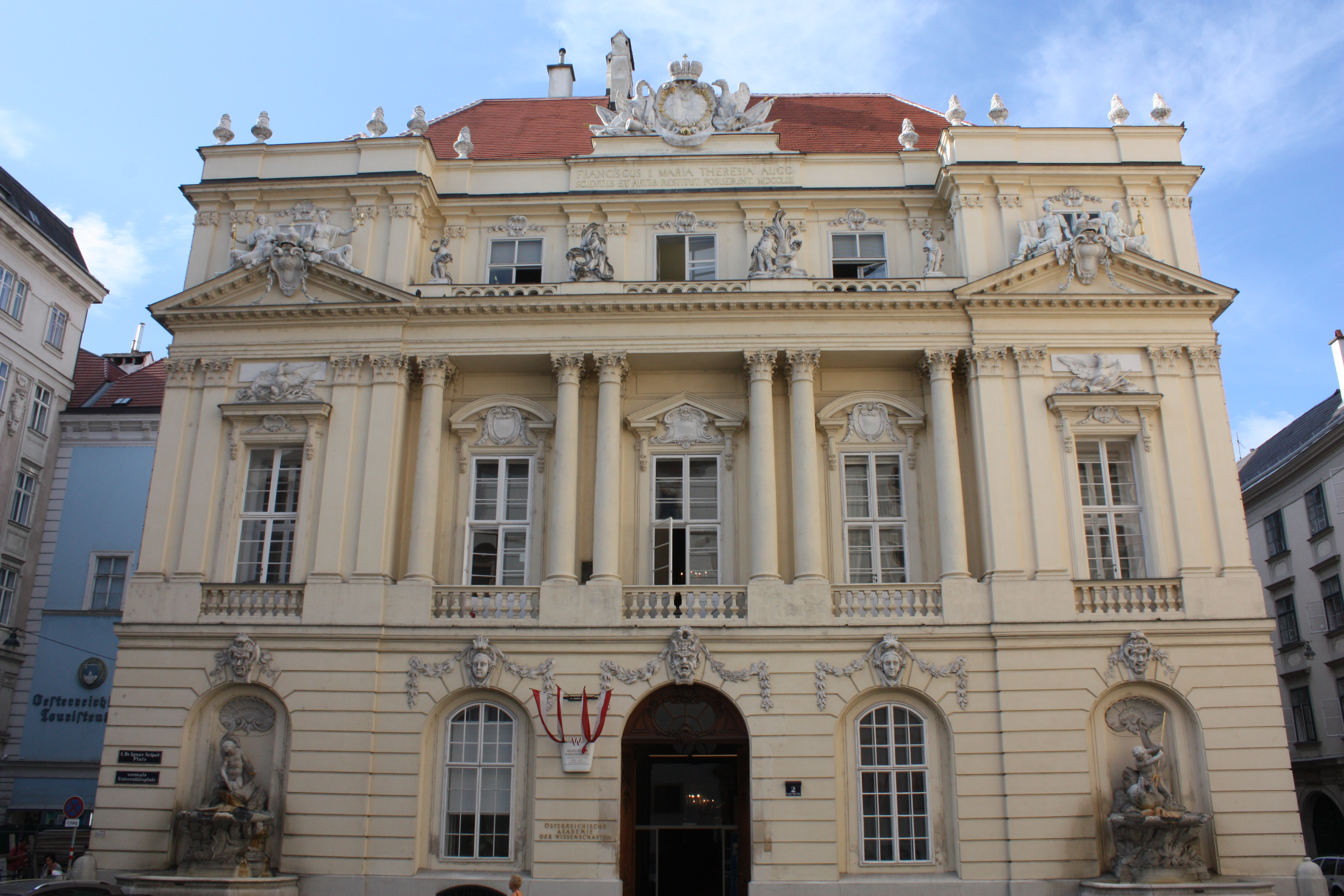
Assembly hall of the old University of Vienna: the first headquarter of the Gesellschaft der Ärzte – today it is the headquarter of the Academy of Sciences.

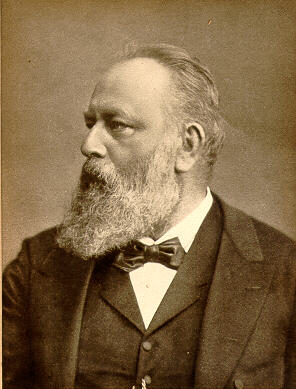
Theodor Billroth

Franz Wirer and Ludwig Türkheim, who both were rectors at the University, are considered "the founding fathers" of the organization; however, this was not possible until the privy councilor Andreas Joseph von Stifft, who was against the creation of the society, died. Their main goal by creating the Gesellschaft der Ärzte was to promote the health sciences as art and science, prior to the goals of the Ärztevereinigung. Additionally, they hoped to use it as a platform to formulate their response to the ongoing cholera epidemic.

Over time, their objectives changed. In 1839, the society changed its focus to promoting drug sciences. The foundation of the Royal Academy of Sciences ("Kaiserliche Akademie der Wissenschaften") in 1847 also helped to promote the medical sciences. While the theoretical subjects such as physics, chemistry, anatomy and biology were discussed in the academy and published in its journal "Denkschrift", the College of Physicians focused on pathology, experimental anatomy, medical chemistry and, in particular, clinical medicine. It is due to the influence of the academy and the college that the faculty of medicine broadened their limited scope beyond medical education and focused increasingly on science and research.

In 1837, the foundation of the society was finally officially approved. The charter members were of course Franz Wirer and Ludwig Turkheim, as well as Johann Malfatti, the general practitioners Gerhard Brants and Joseph von Vering, the director of the general hospital Franz Xaver Güntner, the professor of pathology and pharmacy Leopold Franz Hermann, the climatologist Rudolph von Vivenot, the president of the faculty Johann Nepomuk von Raimann and the professors of the Josephinic Academy Friedrich Jäger von Jaxtthal and Ignaz Rudolf Bischoff.

The first president was Johann Malfatti, who was succeeded by Franz Wirer in 1841. The number of members was at first regulated to a maximum of 40 but raised over time (100 members in 1839, 200 members in 1859).

One of the goals of the society was to establish and nurture a library. Today, it has one of the largest private medical-scientific book collections in the world. The first librarian of the yet-to-be-built library, circa 1840, was the district physician Hermann Hieronymus Beer. The first significant contribution was made by the second president of the society, Franz Wirer, who bequeathed his private book collection to the Gesellschaft der Ärzte after his death.

All the scientific meetings of the society where documented and published in "Zeitschrift der k.k. Gesellschaft der Ärzte" and later in "Wiener klinische Wochenschrift".

Under the presidency of Franz Wirer, the members were divided into four sections: pharmacology, pathology, hygiene and therapy. The members were free to choose their affiliation. This compartmentalization led to an increased number of meetings, as many as 45 per year. After the disbanding of the sections, the frequency decreased to 25 to 35 meetings per year.

=== Second medical school ===
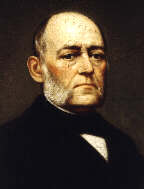
Rokitansky Carl

After Carl Rokitansky was elected president of the society, in 1850, the association focused increasingly on the natural sciences, leading to a new direction for medicine and to the dawning the new era of the Second Medical School (Zweite Wiener Medizinische Schule). The transition towards education is strictly linked to Carl Rokitansky, Joseph Skoda and Ferdindand Hebra. It marks the elevated status of medicine from the philosophic era to one in which scientific discoveries and clinical manifestations were correlated to pathological findings.

During World War I, the frequency of scientific meetings decreased due to difficulties, and addressed mainly plagues, diseases and injuries caused by the war.

Under the National Socialist Regime a law was pushed through in 1938 which stated that any organization had to be led by national socialists. This law marked the abolition of the Gesellschaft der Ärzte. The commissarial conductor of this time was a member of the NSDAP, Adolf Irtl. A few weeks later, the "Wiener Medizinische Gesellschaft" (Viennese Medical Society) was founded, and Otto Planner-Plan was appointed as chairman. It basically assumed all tasks from the College of Physicians, but, due to the war, meetings were rare.

=== After World War II ===
The end of World War II was equivalent to the abolition of the Wiener Medizinische Gesellschaft. Leopold Arzt, the chairman of the university's dermatology clinic, began to rebuild the Gesellschaft der Ärzte. Some of the property of the organization was lost during the war. The library had been moved to a barn in the very north of Austria to protect it from air raids. However, it was under threat from humidity and theft. The Billrothhaus also suffered damage from the war. Thanks to the members funds for both the repairs and the library retrieval were amassed.

The society was re-established and officially approved in April 1946. Wolfgang Denk was elected president. Springer publishing took over the publication of the "Wiener klinische Wochenschrift", which had been discontinued in 1945.

Karl Hermann Spitzy, who gained international renown for his work with penicillin, was president from 1982 to 1991. Franz Kainberger, who is leading the organization today, assumed the presidency after Karl Heinz Tragl, who served from 2007 to 2011. Radiologist Walter Hruby was president from 2015 to 2019. Since March 2019 Helmut Sinzinger (specialist in nuclear medicine) is the current president. Sinzinger died on February 21, 2020. Beatrix Volc-Platzer was elected as the first female President of the College of Physicians in Vienna in October 2020.

== Science and community medicine ==
=== Scientific meetings ===
The most important function of the College of Physicians is the organization of lectures and discussion forums which showcase important health topics and new scientific findings. In the immediate post-war years, the college focused on infectious diseases such as tuberculosis, typhus, pest, pox, erysipelas, rabies but more than anything else, the cholera epidemic. Some of the members' important discoveries even made their way into hospital routine. Karl Eduard Hammerschmidt presented a sphygmometer in 1843, an innovative device to analyze the heartbeat and the arterial pulse. The section of pharmacology contributed to the creation of an Apothecaries Act for the Kaiserstaat Austria, to prevent materialists and spice merchants from selling drugs.

Many lectures dealt with childbed fever which was dreaded due to its high mortality rate. Johann Klein played an important role in these discussions. The medical students under his supervision used to visit the obstetrics ward directly after leaving the autopsy site, without washing their hands. Klein had several arguments with Ignaz Semmelweis, who attributed childbed fever to this behavior. In 1845 and 1848 the society's journal "Zeitschrift der k.k. Gesellschaft der Ärzte" published articles which encouraged all physicians to follow Semmelweis' recommendations. In 1850 Ignaz Semmelweis gave a lecture and reported his findings to the society's members.

To handle increasing demand of water in Vienna, the College of Physicians initiated the "Drei-Quellen-Projekt" (Three Springs Project), which made it possible to access water from surrounding springs. The project was officially introduced by Emperor Franz Joseph I in 1873. As the percent of Vienna's population with clean water rose, there was a drastic decline in cholera cases.

In addition to infectious diseases, the post-WW II society focused on the progress in antibiotics, radiotherapy, surgery and cortisone for the treatment of rheumatic diseases.

Since 2000, the lectures have also addressed the study of medicine in Austria because the educational system came under fire.

=== Therapy ===
Following a discussion about quackery, the medical profession was forced to become more rigorous in clinical practice. The College of Physicians is responsible for two prominent therapeutic progresses: one is the application of electric current in therapeutic measures, the other is the establishment of a laboratory for chemical analysis in the Vienna General Hospital. This laboratory opened the gate to a large number of scientific discoveries, such as the pathomechanism of diabetes. Florian Heller presented a reagent to measure the sugar level in urine, which was subsequently adopted into hospital routine. By 1874, the laboratory had become a state-of-the-art chemical analysis unit, and after 1889, through the influence of Ernst Freud, advanced further, becoming an innovative research institute which developed techniques pertaining to blood coagulation, cell membranes, gastric autodigestion, the effect of insulin and other biologic processes.

During this time, significant progress was also made in the areas of microbiology and surgery. Carl Koller discovered the anesthetic effect of cocaine and Ludwig Türck, who later became the first tenured professor of laryngology, invented a laryngoscope and marked the birth of endoscopy. This first endoscope was continuously refined, and in 1879, the Nietze-Leiter-cystoscope, which is used to examine the urinary bladder, was presented in a meeting of the College of Physicians. Further modifications made the first esophago- and gastroscopy, by Carl Stoerk and Joseph Leiter, possible. Subsequently, Johann von Mikulicz perfected the device. using it to make the first endoscopic diagnosis of gastric cancer.

Another project initiated by the college was the foundation of a hospital in Mariahilf - Vienna's sixth district. Although the construction was approved and initiated, it was halted by World War I.

Robert Koch discovered the tuberculosis pathogen, which led to enormous progress in the battle against this disease. The College of Physicians established a committee for prevention and therapy of tuberculosis and finally published a report with four crucial points: informing the population, reducing exposure to pathogens by improving equipment hygiene, preventing infection, establishing diagnostic and treatment methods through bacteriological tests, by isolating people exposed to tuberculosis, and providing work.

In 1896, Wilhelm Conrad Röntgen wrote a letter to Franz Exner and informed him of his finding - the X-ray. This led to intensive research in this field. A few days later (even before Röntgen had a chance to present his findings in Würzburg), the College of Physicians presented the first radiograph of a shotgun injury. The first radiologic atlas was published by Josef Maria Eder and Eduard Valenta in February 1896. Even the first angiogram was produced in Vienna by Eduard Haschek and the idea to use X-rays in radiotherapy came from Leopold Freund, who very successfully treated a naevus with it.

=== Research ===
In 1901, the journal “Wiener klinische Wochenschrift” published an article by Karl Landsteiner entitled “Über Agglutinationserscheinungen normalen menschlichen Blutes”, which is seen as the foundation of grouping; this changed the picture in medicine completely. For the discovery of the AB0 blood group system, Landsteiner received the nobel prize in 1939.

== Location ==
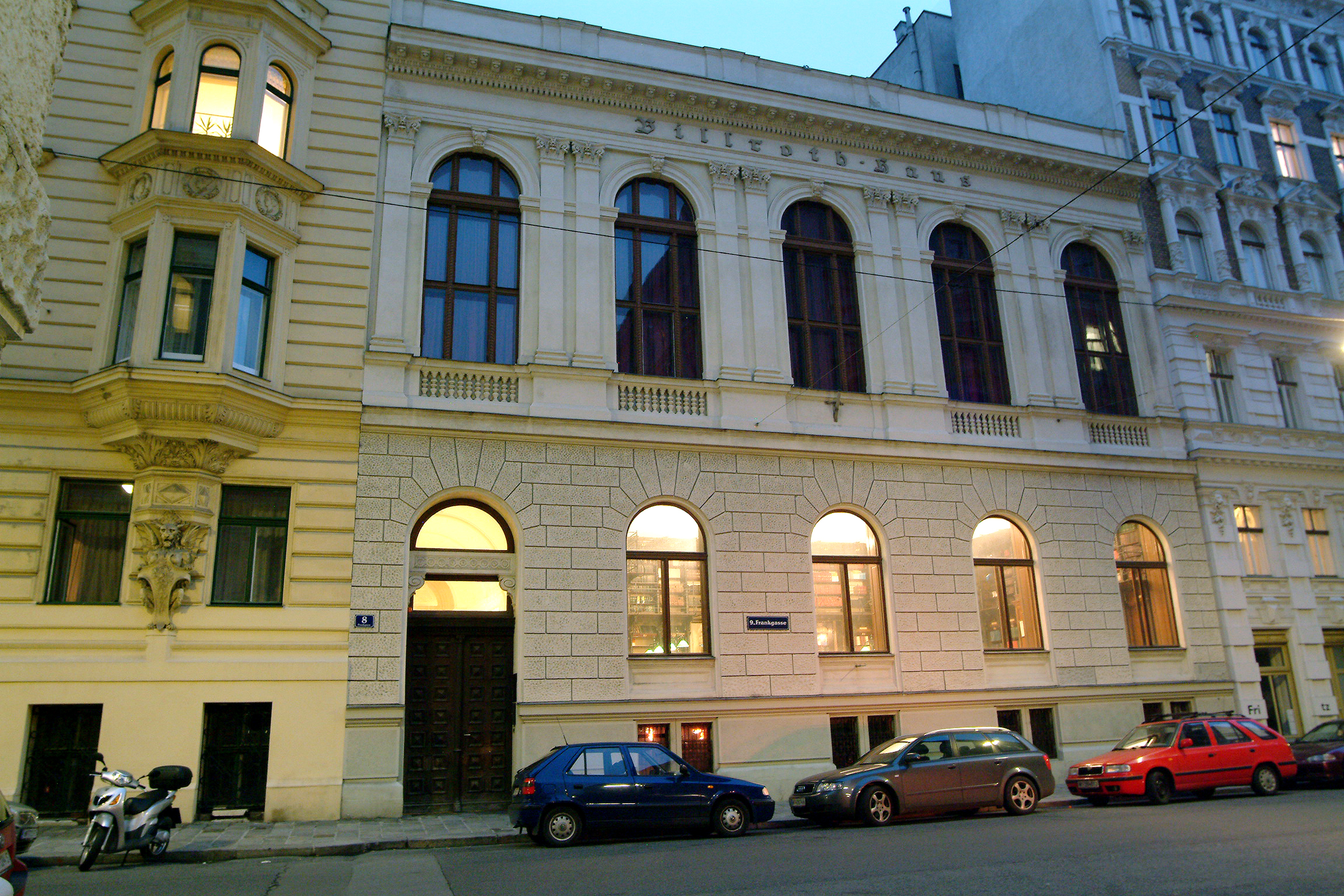
Billrothhaus from outside

The meetings of the society initially took place in the consistory room at the old university. At this point it was not possible to establish a much needed library. Due to the growing audience, the society moved to the 4th floor of the Domkapitel at Stephansplatz in 1841, where a library and a reading room could be built. the group relocated many times again until 1855, when the government provided a gratis flat for them at Teinfaltstraße; this was the society's headquarter for the next forty years. The last relocation occurred on July 23, 1893, into a new building, Frankgasse 8, named after Theodor Billroth. Today, the Billrothhaus remains the headquarter of the College of Physicians, also housing the society's library.

=== Library ===
The library was one of the primary goals of the association. Since its foundation, the collection has grown, through donations and swaps, as well as contributions by members. Today, the Billrothhaus library is one of the most precious book collections worldwide.

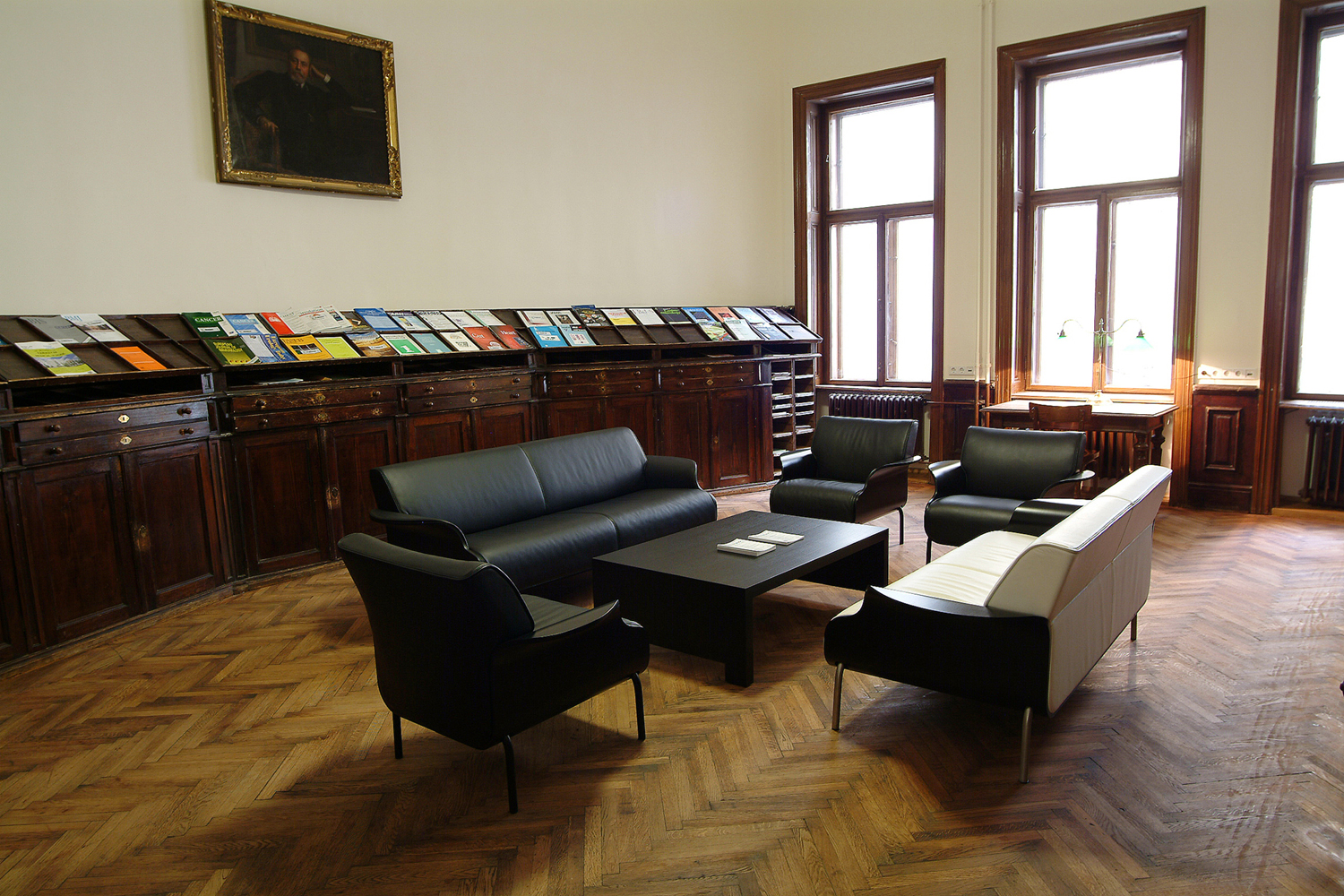
Reading room at the library

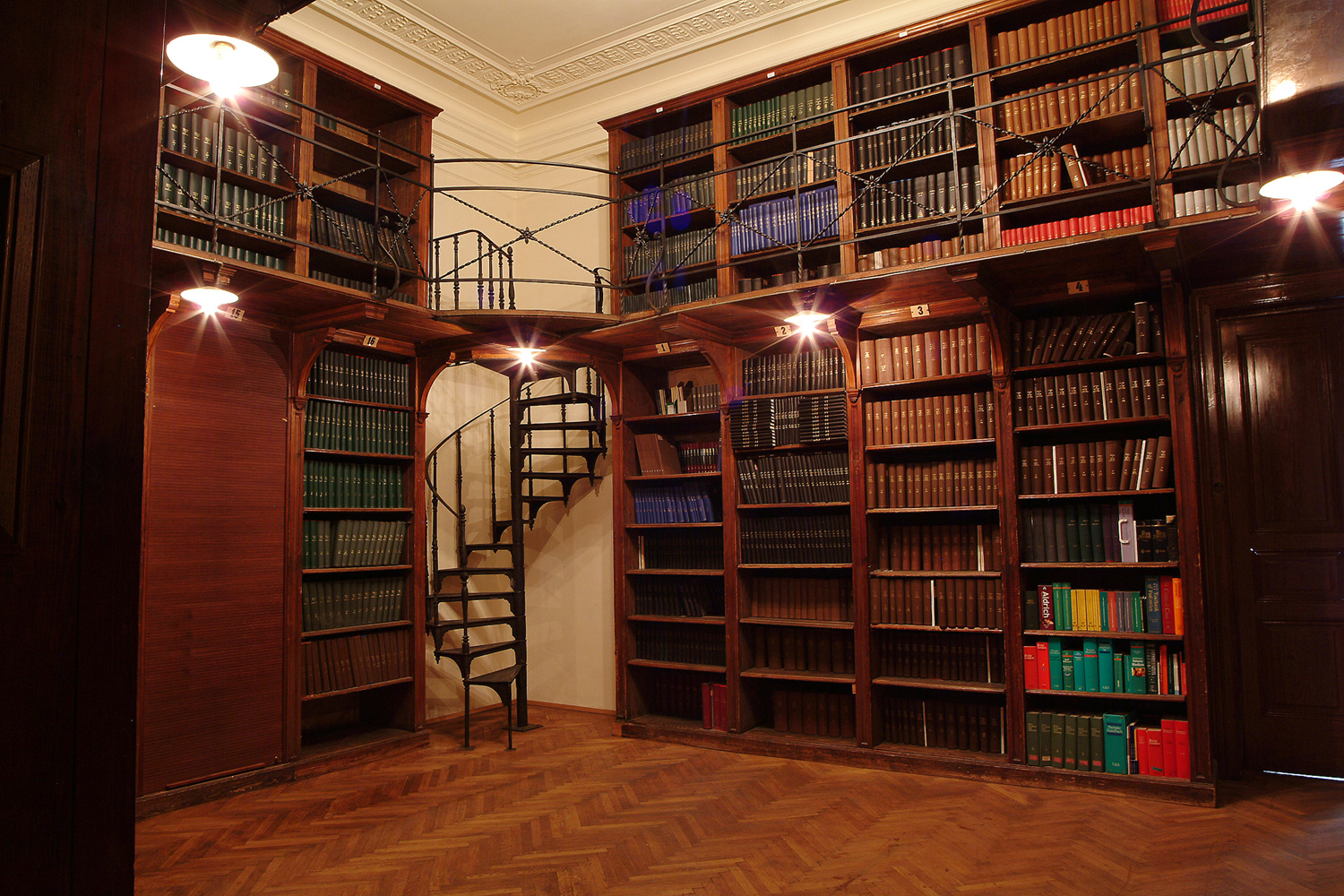
Small library

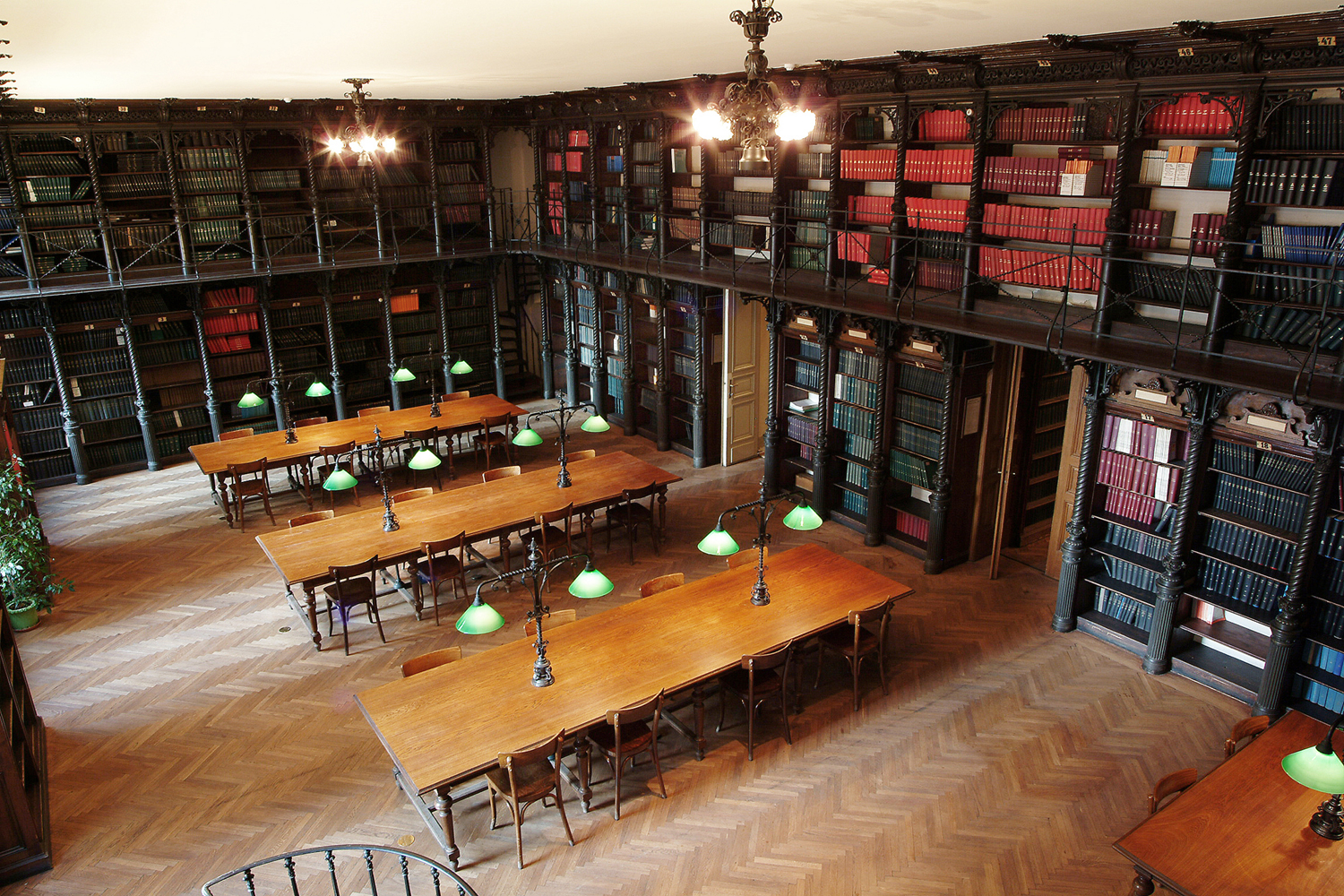
Large library

== Awards ==
he College of Physicians awards persons who render outstanding services to medicine.

=== Wilhelm-Auerswald Prize ===
This prize is awarded biannually in appreciation of the physiologist Wilhelm Auerswald for the best thesis from an Austrian medical faculty.

=== Otto-Kraupp Preis ===
In honor of Otto Kraupp, this prize was established in 1999. It is awarded annually to the graduate with the best medical dissertation in an Austrian University.

=== Theodor-Billroth Medal ===
The society awards the Theodor-Billroth Medal for outstanding services to medicine, science or the College of Physicians.

Past award winners:

- Tassilo Antoine (1895–1980)
- Josef Böck
- Lorenz Böhler (1885–1973)
- Wolfgang Denk (1882–1970)
- Karl Fellinger (1904–2000)
- Hans Finsterer (1877–1955)
- Viktor Frankl (1905–1997)
- Wilhelm Holczabek (1919–2001)
- Oleh Hornykiewicz (born 1926)
- Hubert Kunz
- Erna Lesky (1911–1986)
- Wilhelm Löffler (1887–1972)
- Otto Novotny (1911–1997)
- Leopold Schönbauer (1888–1963)
- Karl Hermann Spitzy (1915–2013)
- Karl Heinz Tragl (born 1936)
- Helmut Wyklicky (1921–2007)

== Nobel Prize winners among the Gesellschaft der Ärzte ==
- Robert Bárány (1876–1936) received the Nobel Prize in 1914 for his work on the vestibular organ
- Fritz Pregl (1869–1930) received the Nobel Prize in 1923 for his method of microanalysis
- Julius Wagner-Jauregg (1857–1940) received the Nobel Prize in 1927 for the discovery of the implocationance of malaria vaccination
- Karl Landsteiner (1868–1943) received the Nobel Prize in 1939 for the discovery of the AB0 blood group system and the Rhesus factor
- Otto Loewi (1873–1961) received the Nobel Prize in 1936 together with Henry Dale for the discovery of the chemical nerve conduction by Acetylcholin
- Adolf Butenandt (1903–1995) received the Nobel Prize in 1939 together with Leopold Ruzicka for his work on the field of steroid hormones
- Alexander Fleming (1881–1955) received the Nobel Prize in 1945 for the discovery of Penicillin
- Carl Ferdinand Cori (1896–1984) received the Nobel Prize in 1947 together with his wife Gerty Theresa Cori (1896–1957) for the discovery of catalytic glycogen metabolization
- Max Ferdinand Perutz (1914–2002) received the Nobel Prize in 1962 together with John Cowdery Kendrew for his work on determination of haemoglobin
- Manfred Eigen (1927) received the Nobel Prize in 1967 together with Ronald Norrish and George Plocationer for their work on fast chemical reactions due to interferences in equilibrium of shlocation impulses
- Karl von Frisch (1886–1982) received the Nobel Prize in 1973 together with Konrad Lorenz and Nikolaas Tinbergen for the discovery of organization and release of individual and social behavioral patterns
- Konrad Lorenz (1903–1989) received the Nobel Prize in 1973 together with Nikoaal Tinbergen andKarl von Frisch for his genetic studies
