= Billrothhaus =

Coordinates: 48.2157°N 16.3561°E

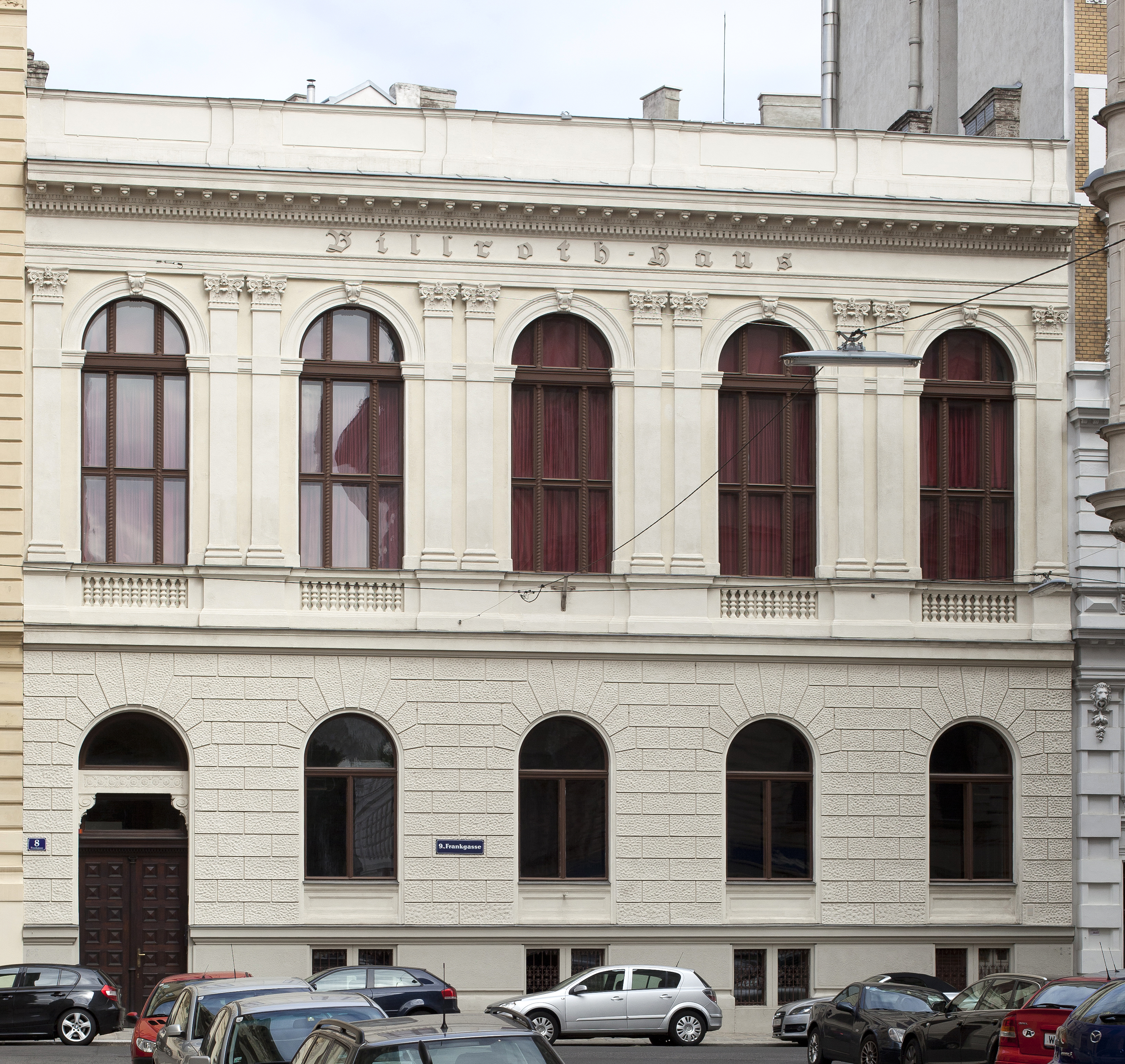
Billrothhaus Frankgasse 8, Vienna

The Billrothhaus is the headquarters of the Gesellschaft der Ärzte in Wien (College of Physicians in Vienna). It was named after Theodor Billroth, an Austrian physician and former president of the society.

== History ==
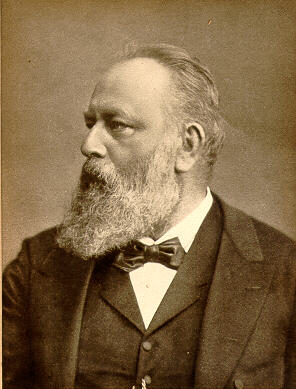
Theodor Billroth

Due to the increasing size of the society's book collection and its membership, the society's operations relocated several times. Eventually in 1855, the former society president, Heinrich Bamberger, set up a committee to plan the construction of a building on a site to be purchased by the society. In 1888, Theodor Billroth, the then-president, called upon the members to buy shares of the yet-to-be-built society house. A 662 m^{2} (7,130 sq ft) site in Vienna's 9th district was bought for 57,000 guilders.

The committee established the following building requirements:

- minimum 300 seat assembly hall
- minimum 100 seat gallery
- display room for the anatomic and histologic specimens
- library and reading room
- green room and archive
- 80-100 seat general conference room and administrative board conference room
- flat for the janitor
- cloakrooms and toilets on every floor

The architect Ludwig Richter was awarded the commission and two years later, on October 27, 1893, the building was officially opened by Theodor Billroth.

The two story building, with basement, has undergone several alterations since 1906. The patio was deepened and the basement dried in order to create a book storage area. In 1909, the patio was extended to accommodate large and small archives and a cloakroom. The library and the large conference room remain on the wing facing the street. The small conference room, behind the stairway, has been converted into a reading room where members can browse journals.

On 9 May 1919 the newly elected president, Anton Eiselsberg, proposed, and the society agreed, that the building be named "Billrothhaus".

During World War II the College of Physicians was abolished and replaced by the "Wiener Medizinische Gesellschaft" which was controlled by the Nazis. The library was removed to a barn to protect it from bomb attacks. The Billrothhaus which sustained damage during the war, was repaired after the war's end, when the College of Physicians was reinstituted. The library was retrieved and the basement was altered into book storage.

The building has been under monumental protection since 2008.

== Architecture ==
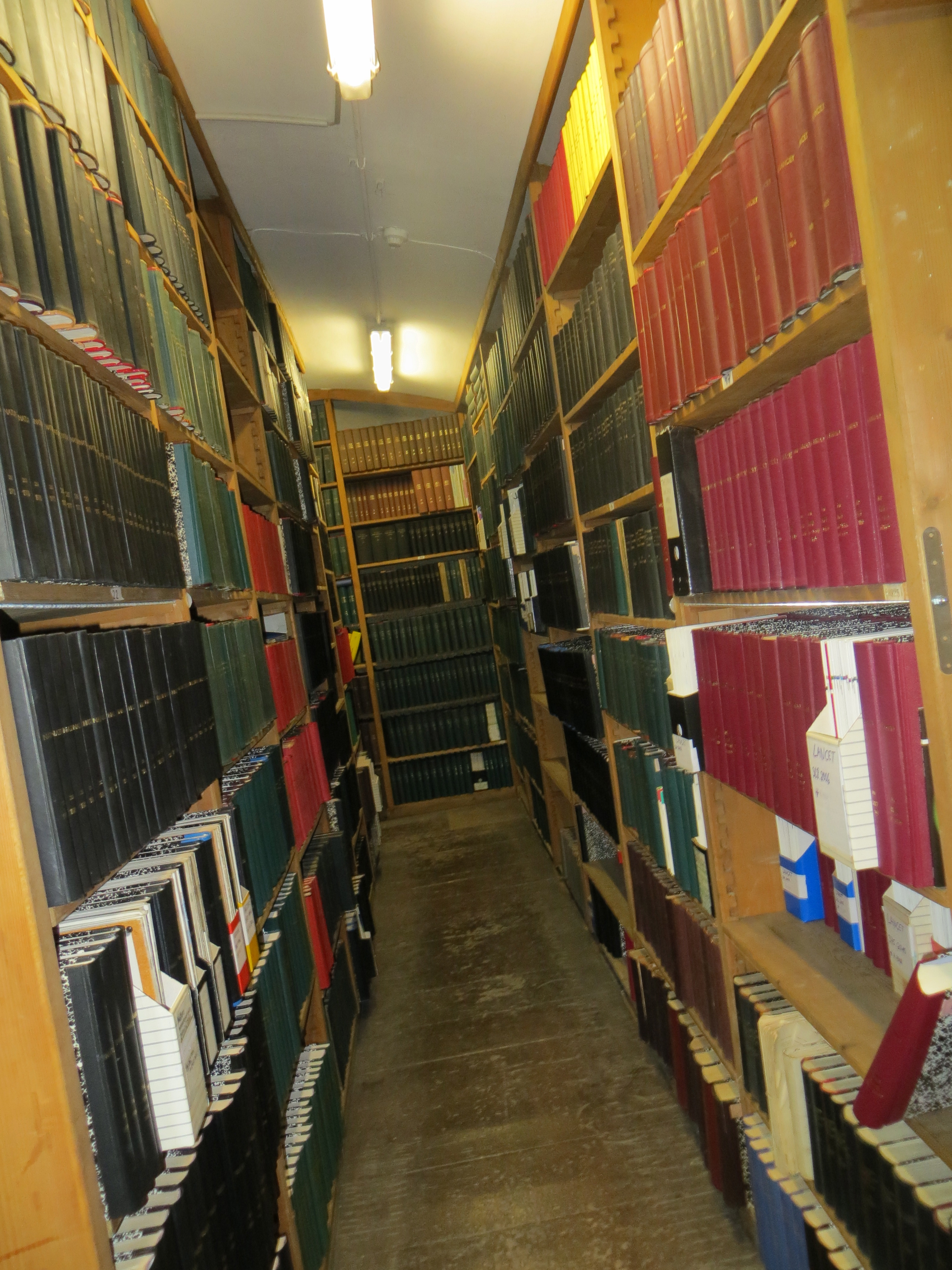
Archive seen from the stairs of the large library

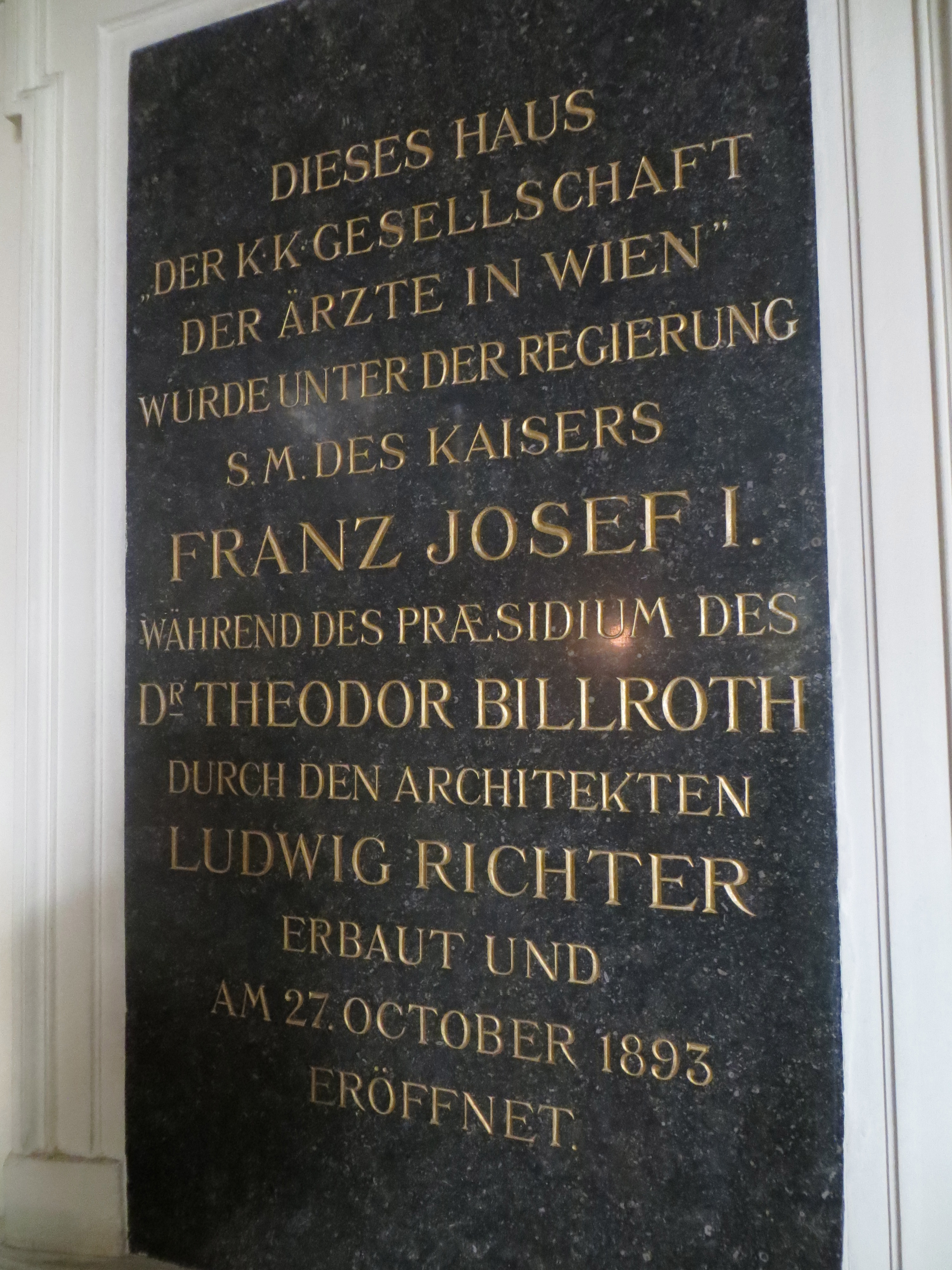
Votive tablet in a niche of the vestibule of the Billrothhaus with references to the creation of the building

The Billrothhaus, erected 1892/93 has two floors and five axes. It is a palatial building in the Neo-Renaissance style. The front is rusticated and at the level of the upper floor, arched windows can be found between Corinthian pilasters.

An attic style balustrade is arranged on the entire length of the building above the profiled ledge. The balustrade was originally decorated with statues of Apollo, Asklepios, Hygieia and Minerva, made of Loretto stone by the sculptor Anton Pavel Wagner. Beyond a curved entry hall a wooden door with original corroded discs grants access to the building. Another similar door straight ahead leads to the yard, and to the right a stair with handrails between two marble columns leads to a spacious foyer on the elevated ground floor. The foyer and the vestibule are equipped with terrazzo floors. The original porter's lodge is located to the left of the entry hall and behind it, in the backyard section of the building, is a meeting room with old wooden furniture. A richly ornamented niche in the vestibule shows a bust of Emperor Franz Joseph I and on its side walls, a votive table reveals some facts concerning the construction.

The sides of the staircase are framed by adjusted pillars and the foyer is decorated with composite pilasters and a stucco ceiling. The reading room on the ground floor is equipped with partially original bookshelves and a gallery with lathed columns.

The large, rectangular auditory is located on the upper floor and is circumferentially equipped with a matroneum. The wall is segmented with alternating arches and pilasters. Lunette caps with plaster busts of famous medics are located above them. The coffered ceiling is made of stucco. Two marble busts, Joseph Skoda and Theodor Billroth, are placed on the balustrade. The small conference room is located in the wing facing the backyard; it is richly ornamented with two busts and a painting.

== Library ==
One of the society's ultimate objectives, from its start, was the establishment of a library. Most of the medical scientific journals were acquired by barter or endowment - either from members or outsiders. The library's inventory grew. through book donations from members, as well as from benefactors of institutions (such as the court library or Prince Klemens Metternich) so large that by 1840, the founding year of the library, a librarian had to be recruited. Since 1900, even clinics and institutes of the Vienna General Hospital have donated books and journals. After World War I, the members used their connections to enlist foreign literature, ultimately acquiring contributions from Uruguay, the London University and the Rockefeller Foundation. Today, the library at the Billrothhaus is one of the most precious book collections worldwide.

Isidor Fischer, the librarian after 1923, was able to contract barter agreements with German institutions, which guaranteed a certain contingent of scientific journals. In exchange, the library offered the society's own journal, the "Wiener klinische Wochenschrift". After the annexation of Austria to Germany, Isidor Fischer had to go into exile, but shortly before he was able to publish a book about the College of Physicians, of which he was not named as an author. During the society's abolition, i.e. World War II, Adolf Irtl assumed the business affairs by creating the "Wiener Medizinische Gesellschaft". During the appraisal of the company's property, the library was deemed "priceless". In 1946, the society was reinitiated, and the library reactivated. As members rekindled their connections with foreign colleagues, the inventory of medical books and journals grew again.

Large sections of the Billrothhaus library were relocated to the library of medical history, on permanent loan. In 1967 more than 30,000 books (10,000 of them doublets) were transferred. In 2006, approximately 26,000 history-of-medicine monographs and 300 journals documenting the medical developments during the former Habsburg monarchy, were added to the permanent loanstock.

The volume of journals kept growing. However, the changing culture of the librarians, as well as scarce financial resources forced the library to develop a new concept. Since 1997, printed journals have been replaced by electronic journals. A document supply service was established, which granted access to scientific articles. The service continued to expand such that today it has a system for Medline-search, about 700 electronic journals and a catalogue of the historic collection. In collaboration with the Austrian Medical Association, the society offers E-learning courses for physicians since 2004, and since 1998, all scientific meetings are captured on video and uploaded onto their website.

== Gallery ==
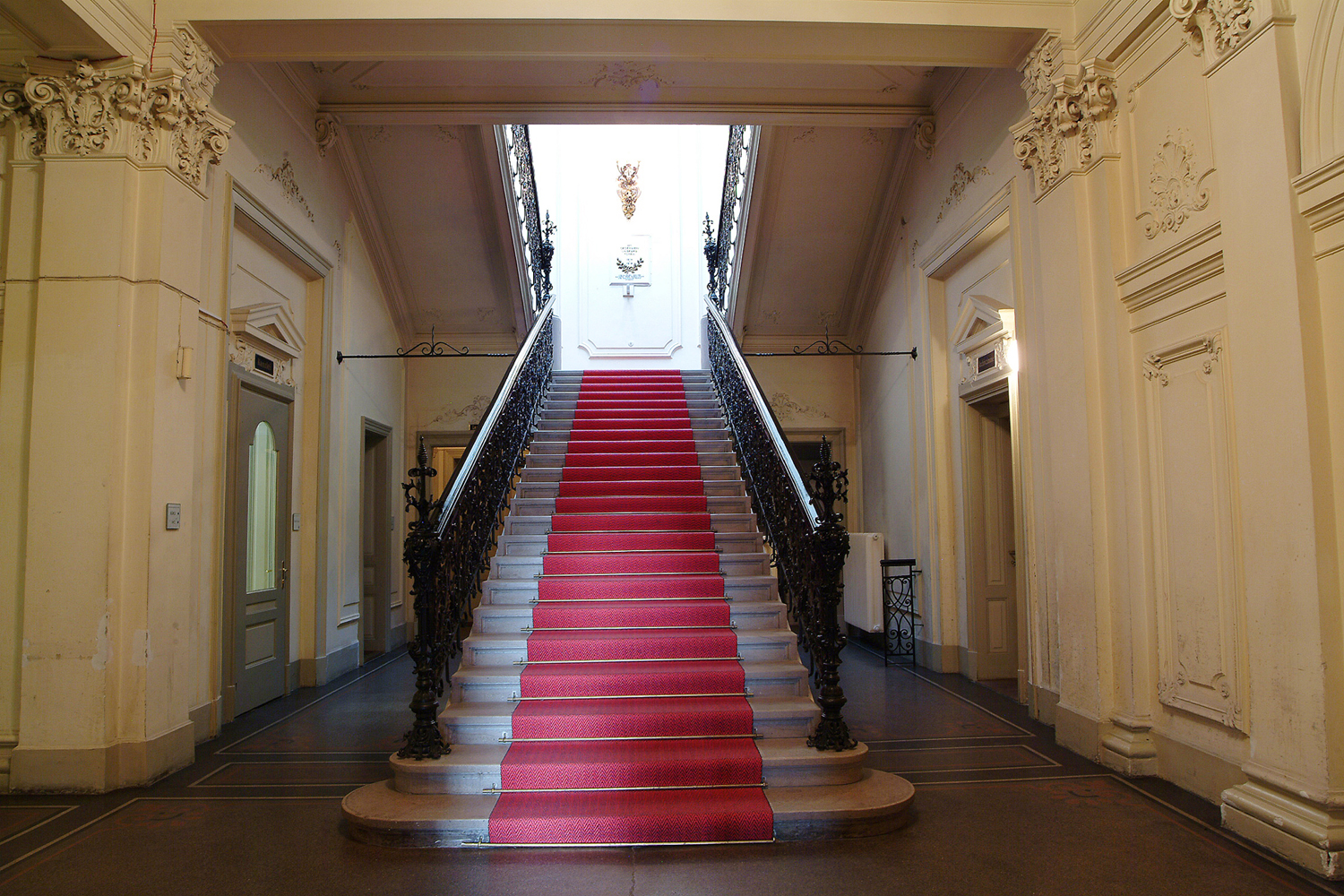
Stairs to the Billrothhaus

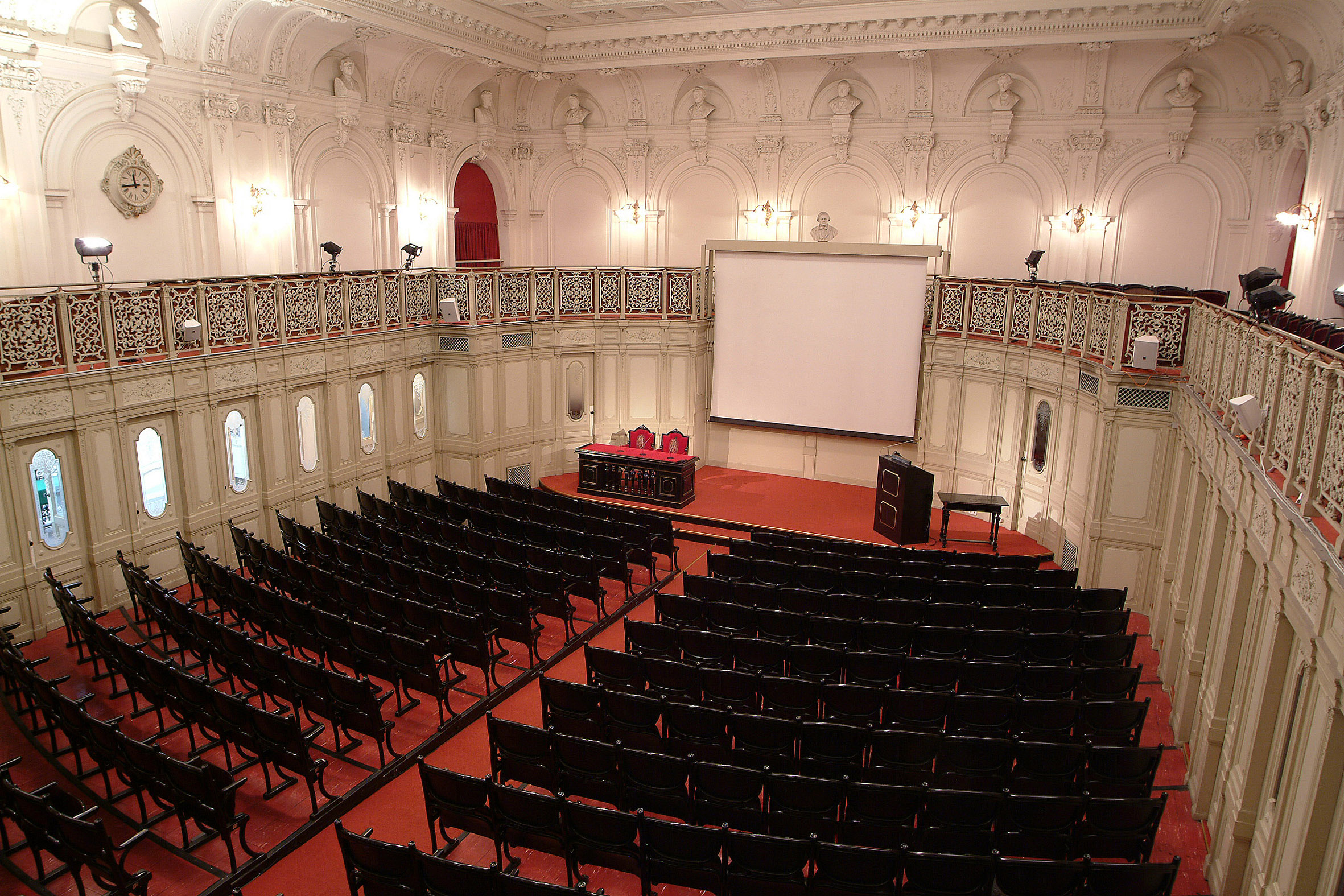
Ballroom

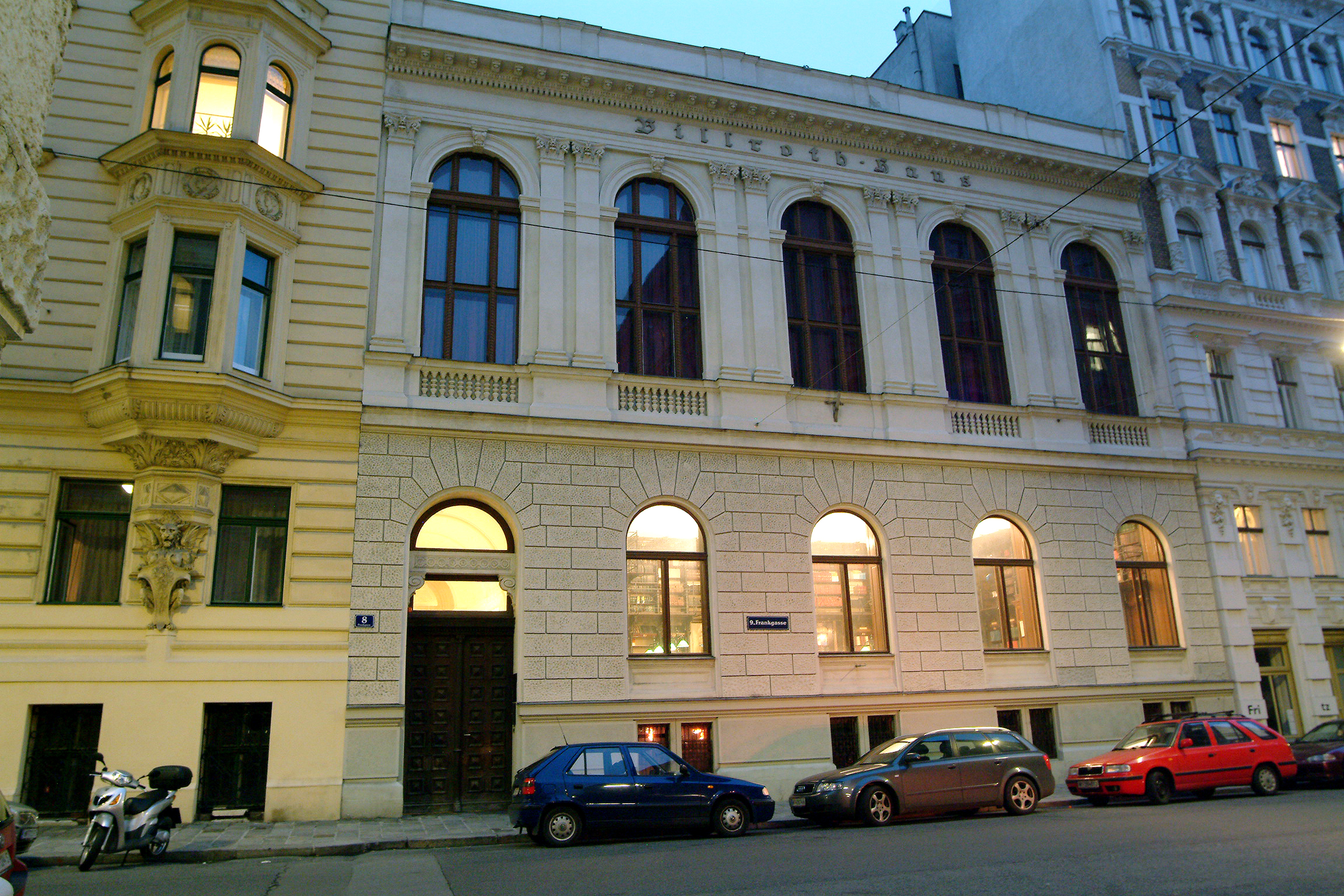
Billrothhaus from outside

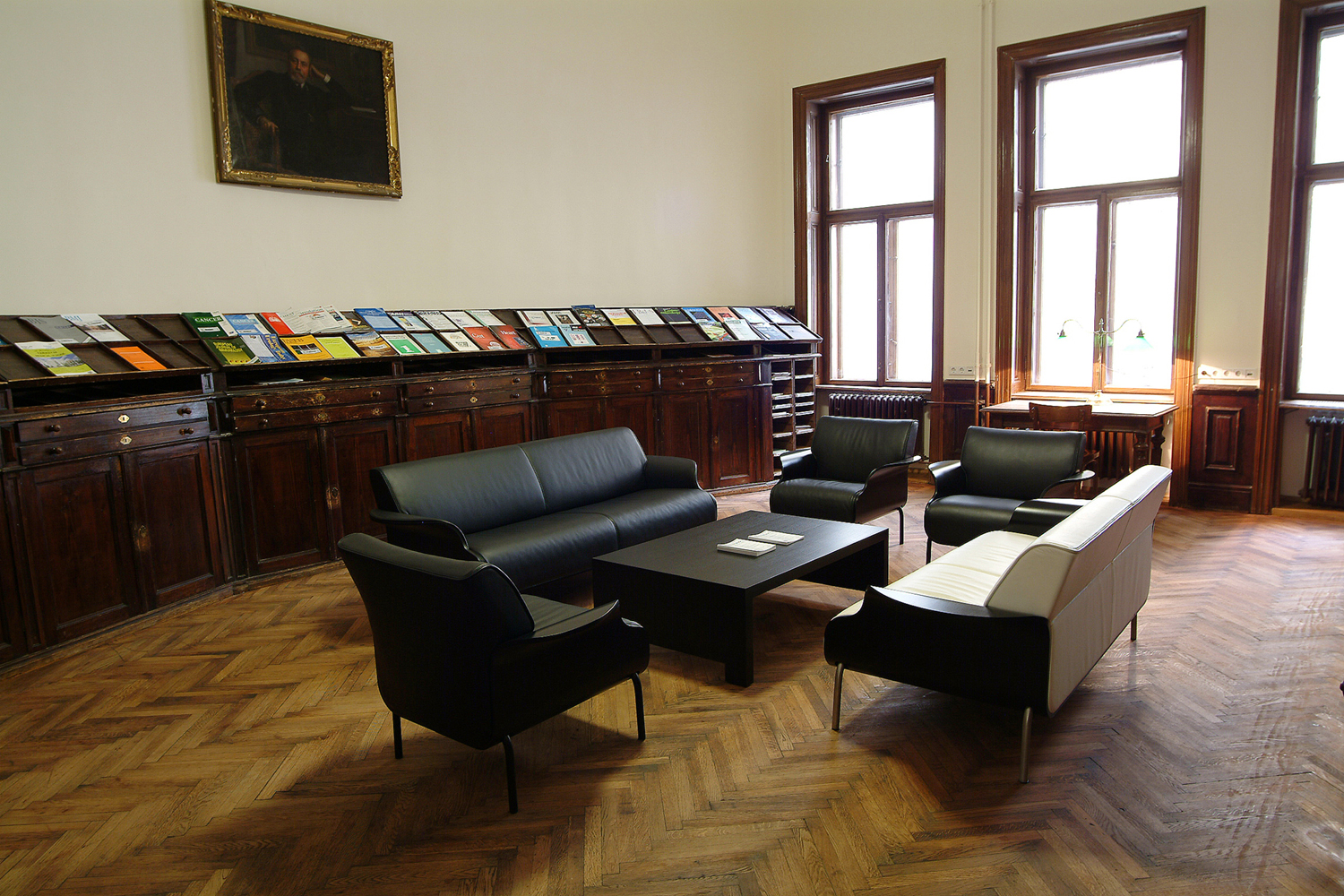
Reading room

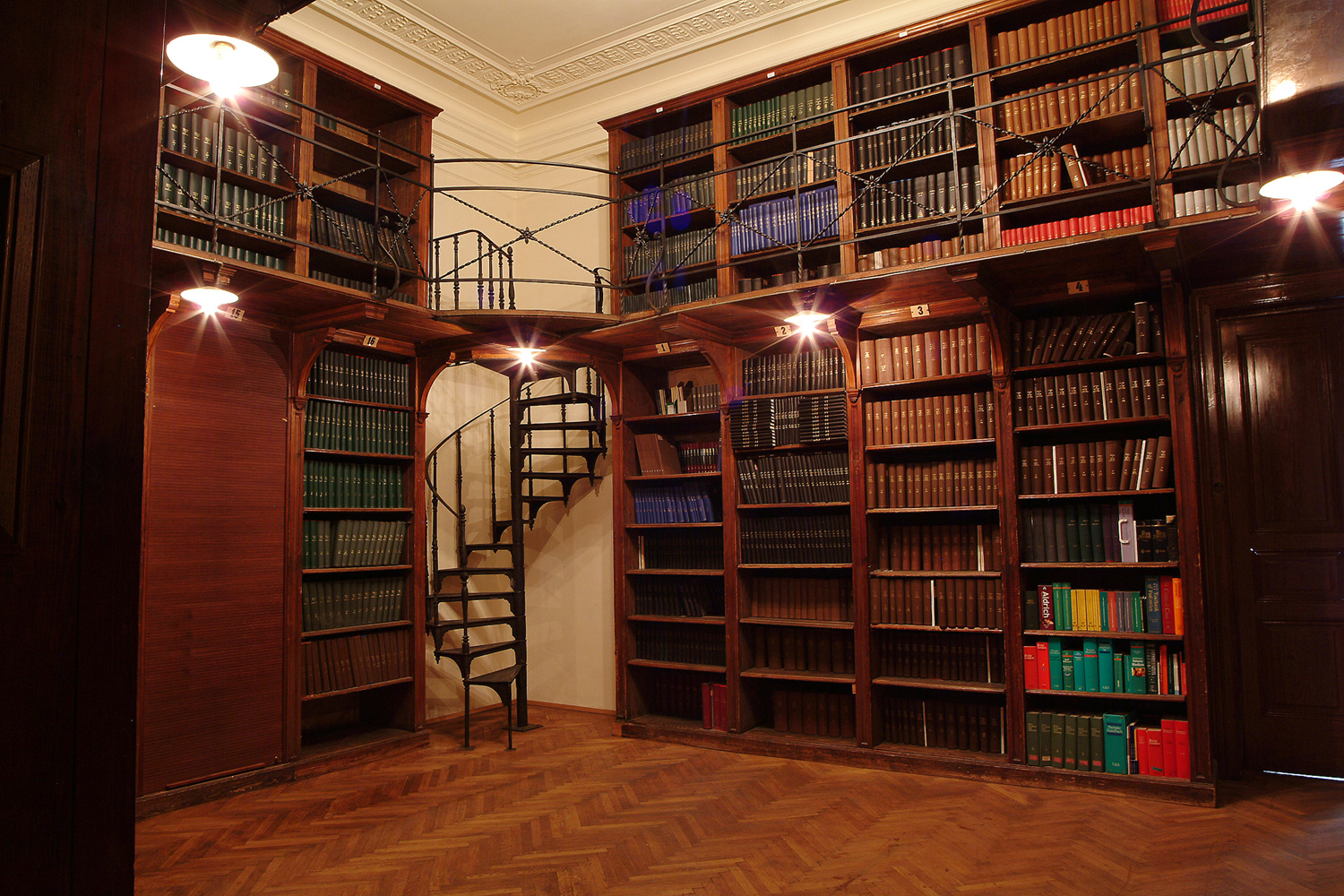
Small library

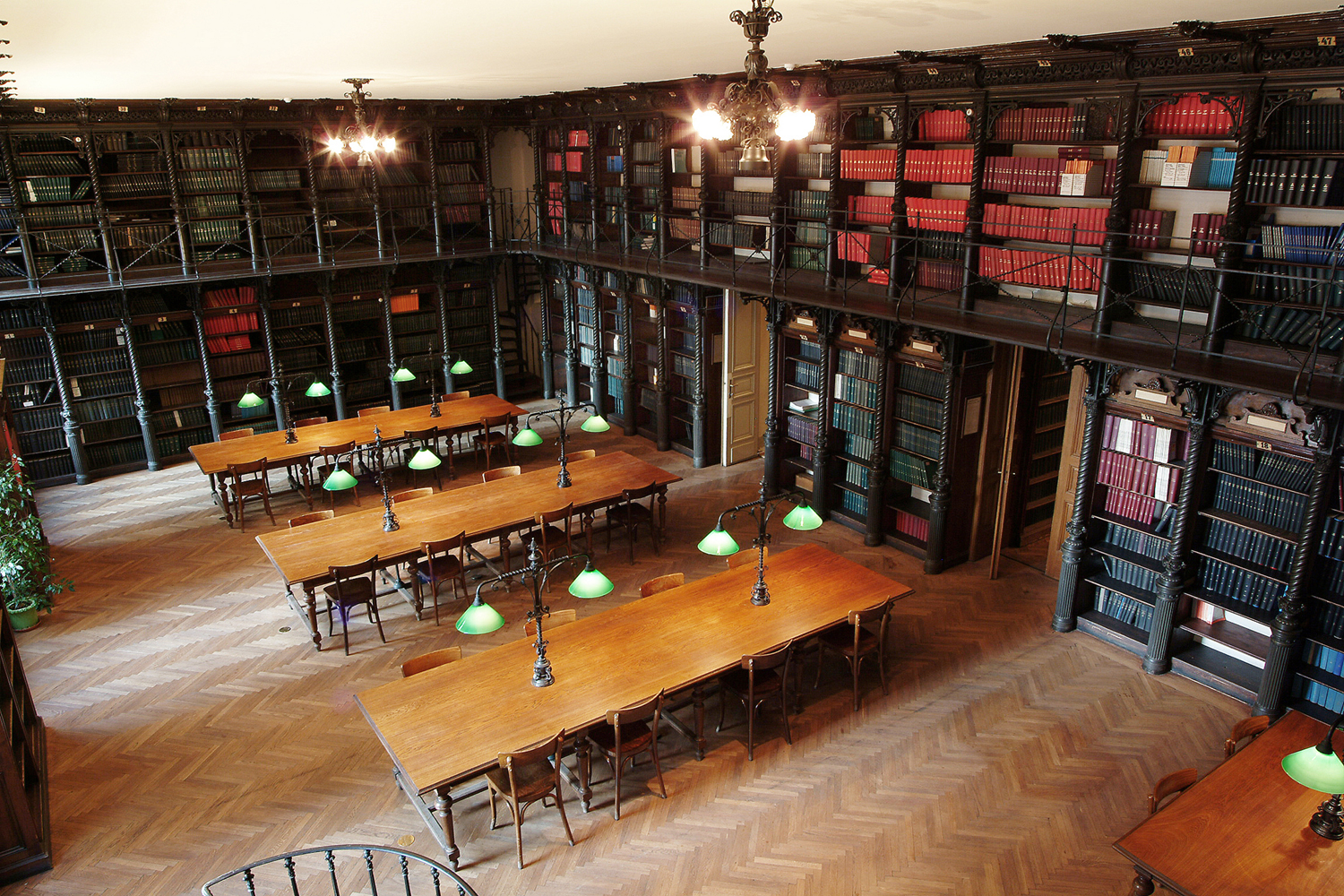
Large library

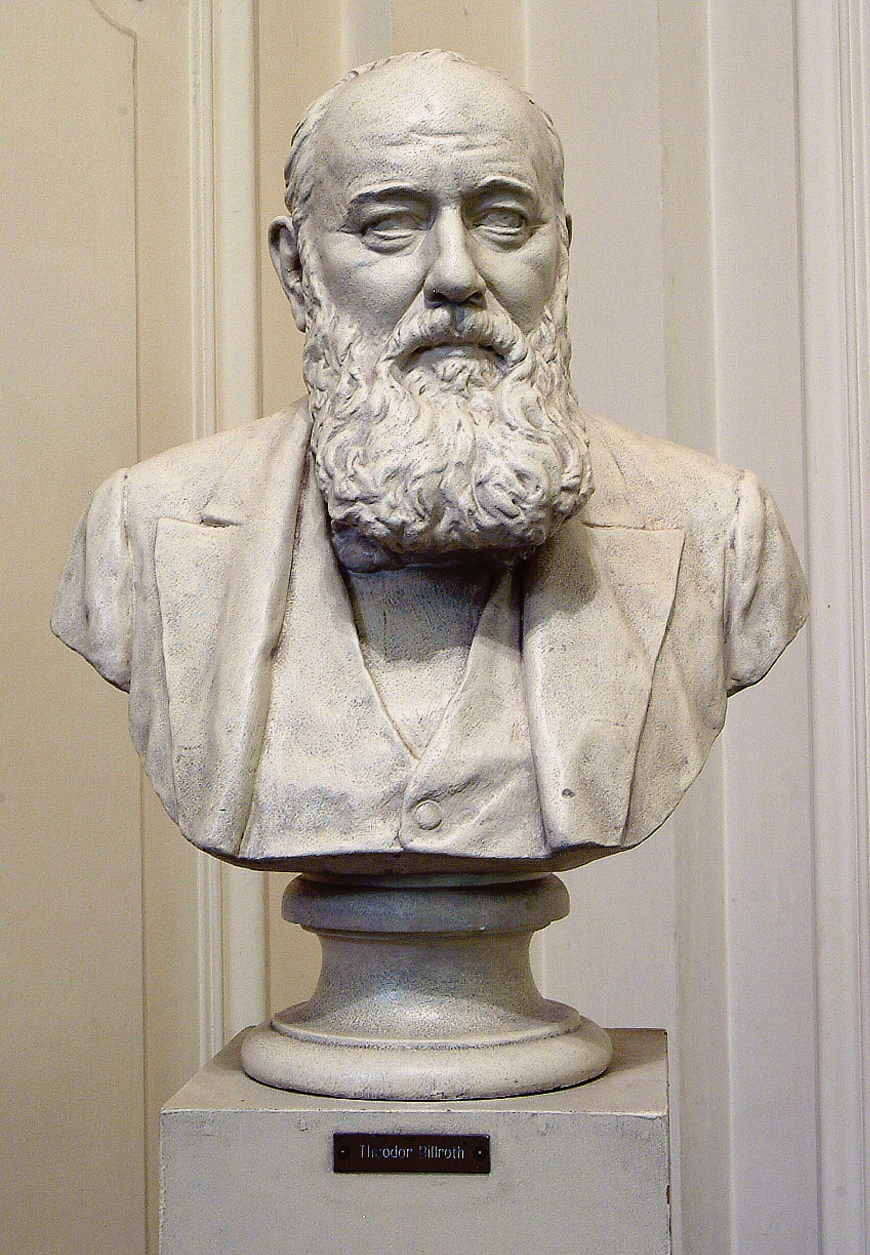
Bust of Theodor Billroth

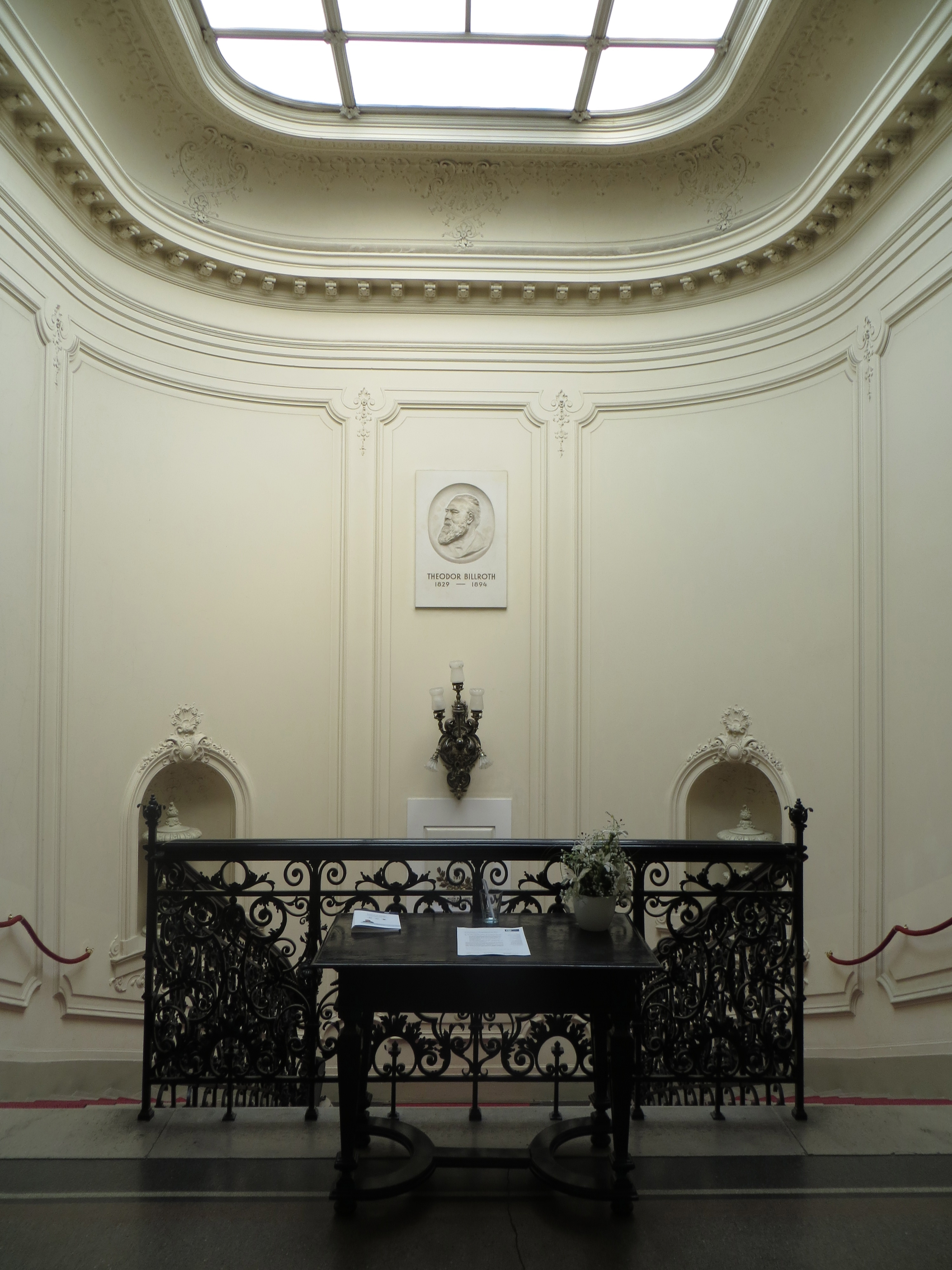
Stairway to the second floor

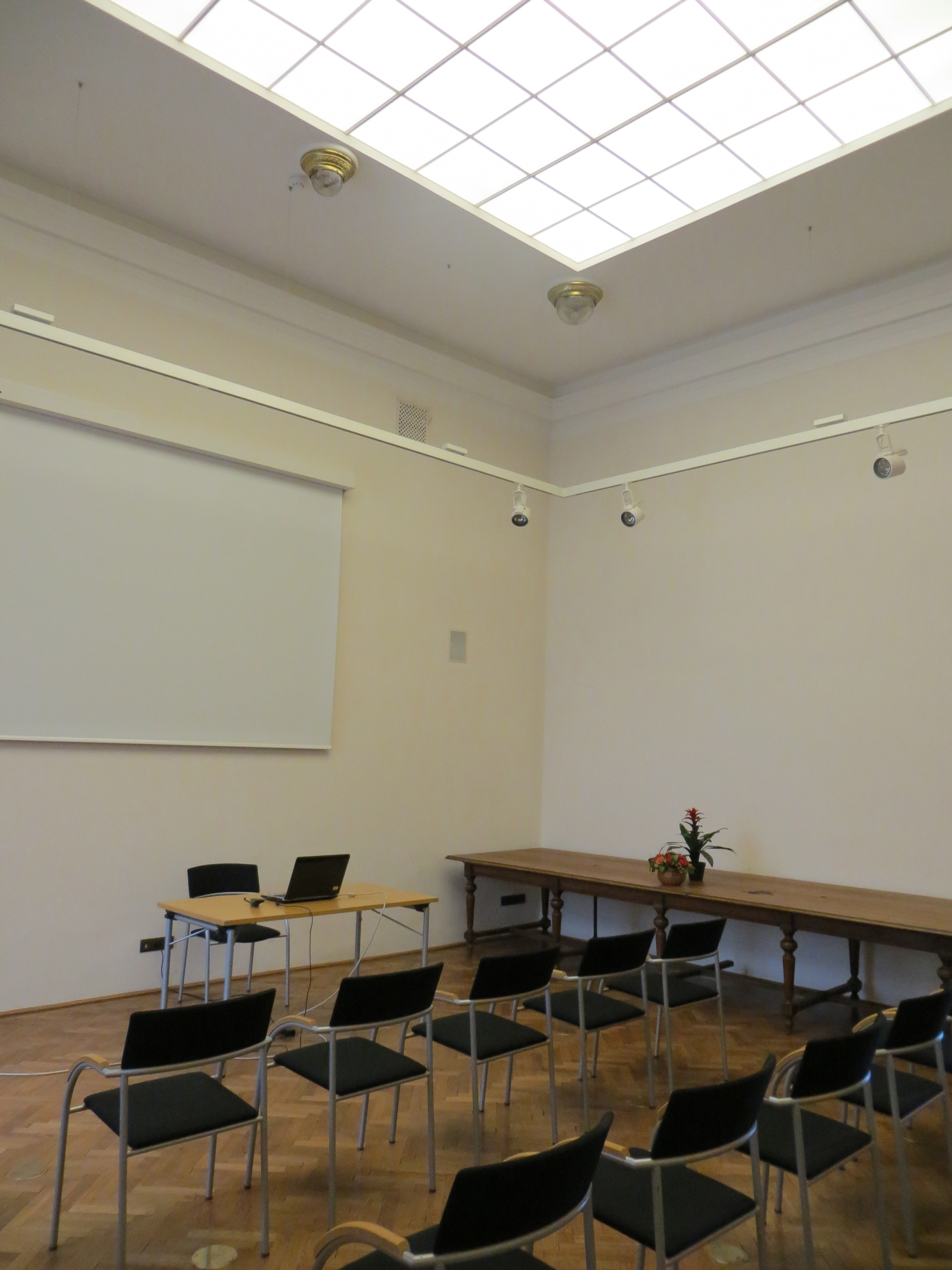
Small conference room

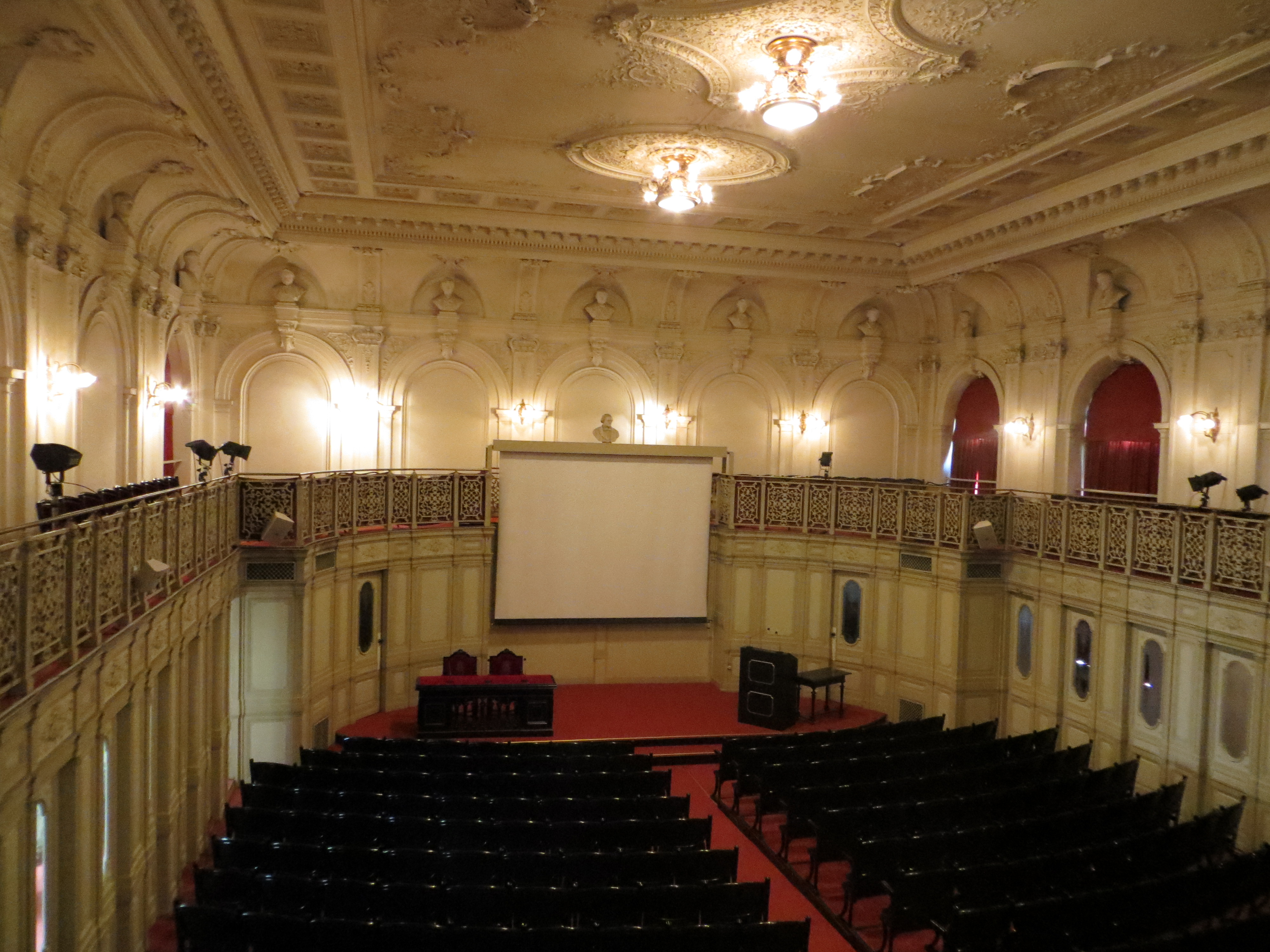
Large conference room

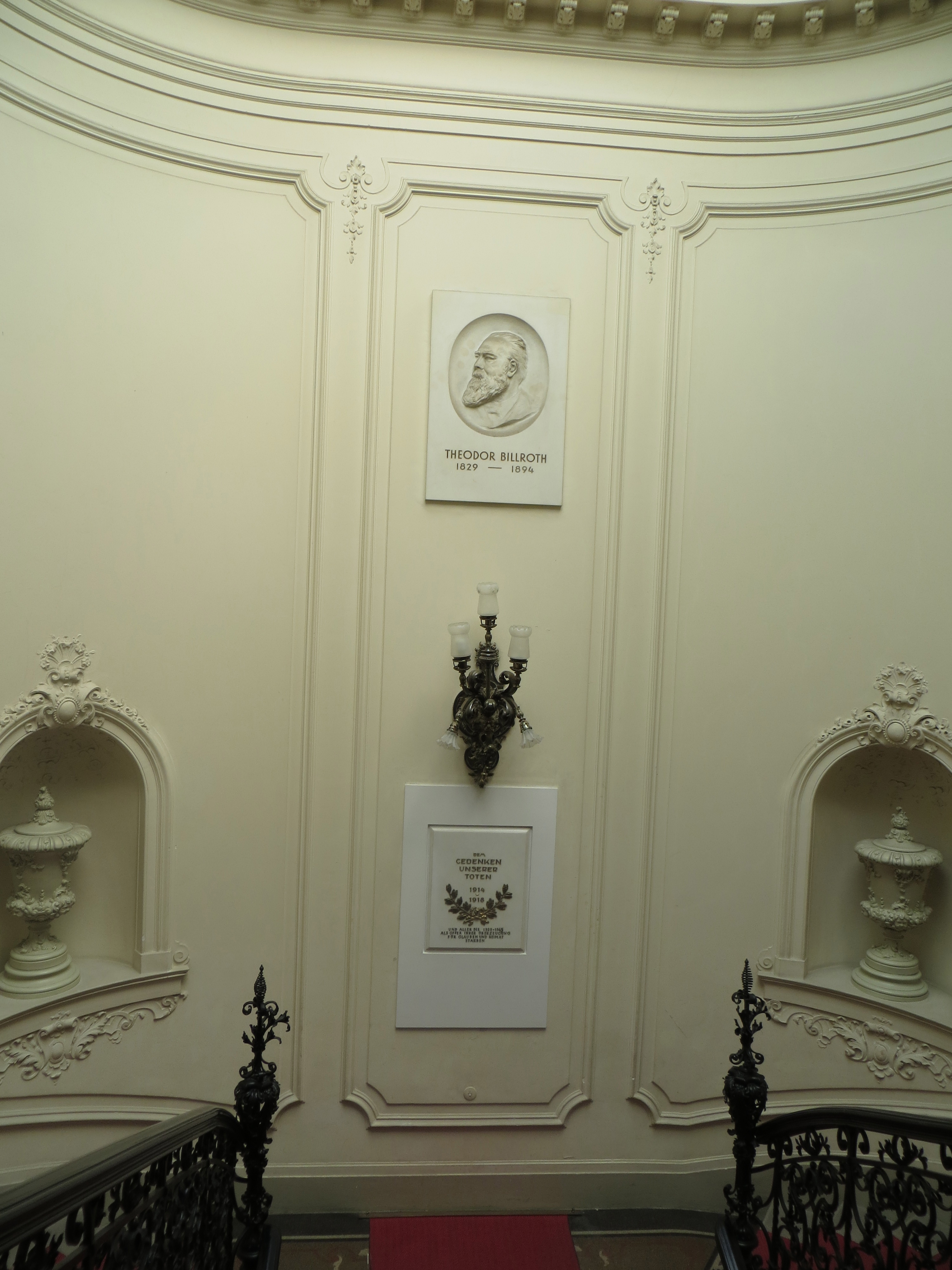
Stairway to the Billrotthaus

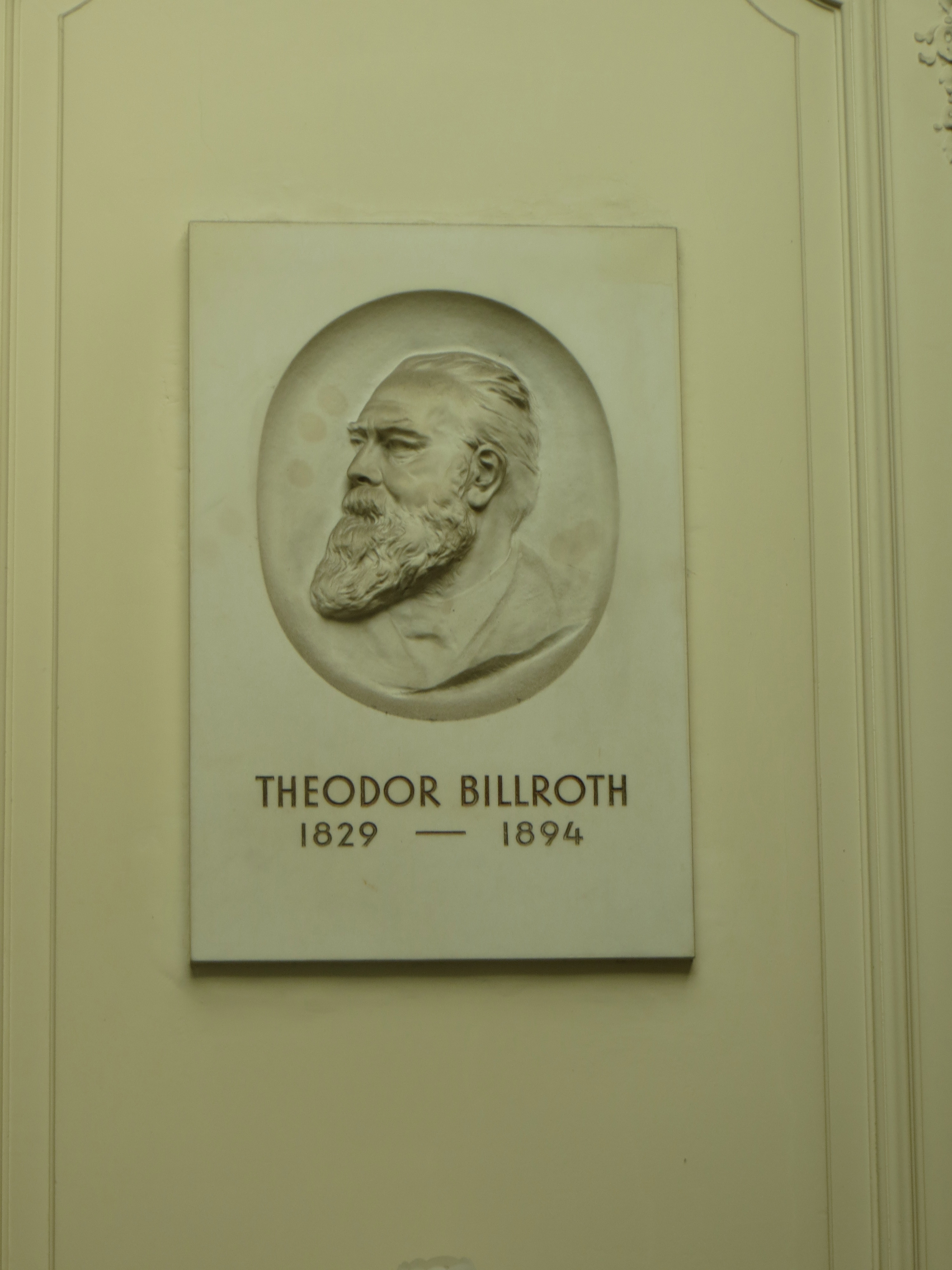
Picture of Theodor Billroth

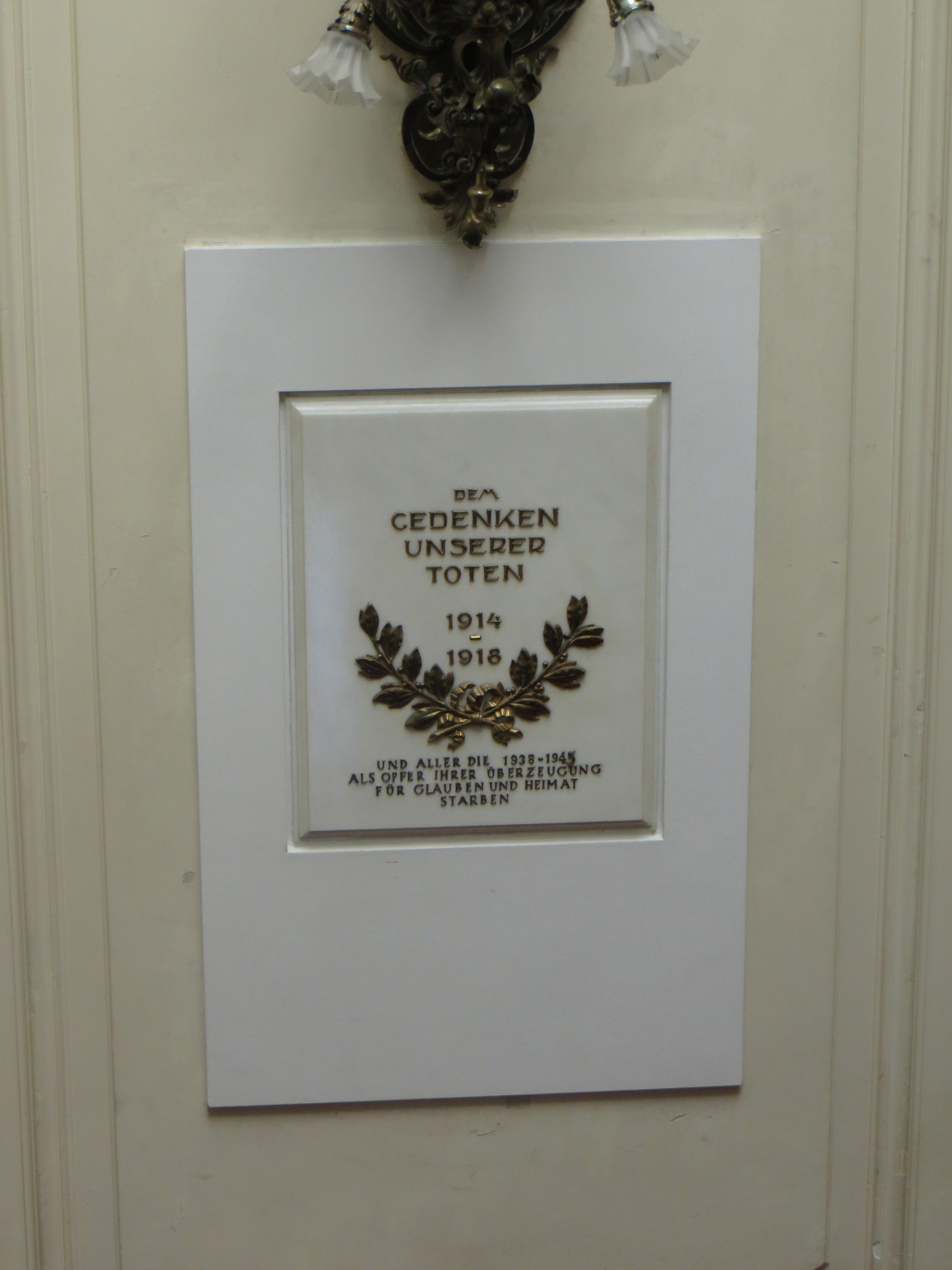
commemorative plaque at the stairway
